= List of New Zealand men's international footballers =

This is a list of New Zealand men's international footballers – association football players who have played for the New Zealand national football team in officially recognised international matches. All players with official full international caps are listed here.

== List of players ==
Key

	In current National Team Squad
Caps	Appearances
WC	Member of squad at FIFA World Cups
FC	Member of squad at FIFA Confederations Cups

This table takes into account all New Zealand A-international matches played up to and including 18 November 2025 after the game against Ecuador.

Player	Caps	Goals	First Cap	Last Cap	Début vs	WC	FC	Other
Glen Adam	16	1	1978	1984	Singapore	1982		
Kyle Adams	1	0	2023	2023	China			
Luke Adams	5	1	2016	2016	Fiji			
Jock Aird	2	1	1958	1958	Australia			Scotland, 1954
Martin Akers	1	0	1997	1997	Indonesia			
Frank Albrechtsen	3	0	1952	1952	Fiji			
Bobby Almond	28	0	1979	1982	Australia	1982		
George Anderson	4	0	1927	1927	Canada			
Bill Anton	1	0	1922	1922	Australia			
Brian Armstrong	9	0	1973	1975	Fiji			
Ken Armstrong	9	3	1958	1962	Tahiti			England, 1955; NZ Manager 1958-1964
Mark Armstrong	7	3	1980	1980	Fiji			
Ron Armstrong	25	0	1971	1983	New Caledonia			
Nigel Ashurst	3	0	1972	1972	New Caledonia			
Mark Atkinson	36	0	1997	2001	Fiji		1999	
Harold Balk	5	0	1923	1927	Australia			
Charles Ballard	8	1	1922	1927	Australia			
Cliff Banham	4	0	1952	1952	Fiji			
Campbell Banks	3	1	2006	2006	Malaysia			
James Bannatyne	3	0	2001	2010	Cook Islands	2010	2009	
Kosta Barbarouses	72	9	2008	2025	Fiji		2017	
Gordon Barker	1	0	1954	1954	Australia			
Noel Barkley	20	5	1986	1991	Fiji			
Andrew Barron	12	1	2006	2010	Malaysia	2010	2009	
Eddie Barton	1	0	1933	1933	Australia			
Keith Barton	1	0	1975	1975	China			
Len Barwell	1	0	1922	1922	Australia			
Jason Batty	47	0	1995	2003	Singapore		1999 2003	
Shaun Baxter	7	1	1980	1980	Kuwait			
Len Beavis	1	0	1947	1947	South Africa			
Julius Beck	1	0	1967	1967	New Caledonia			
Jim Bell	2	1	1960	1960	Tahiti			
Joe Bell	29	1	2019	2025	Republic of Ireland			
Fred Benge	3	0	1954	1954	Australia			
Leo Bertos	56	0	2003	2013	Iran	2010	2009	
Myer Bevan	6	2	2017	2018	Solomon Islands			
Grahame Bilby	8	1	1967	1971	New Caledonia			Black Caps 1966
Noah Billingsley	3	0	2018	2018	Kenya			
Ken Billot	2	0	1980	1980	Mexico			
Tyler Bindon	21	1	2023	2025	DR Congo			
Kevin Birch	9	0	1984	1985	Malaysia			
Malcolm Bland	16	2	1969	1973	New Caledonia			
Allan Boath	38	6	1980	1988	Chinese Taipei	1982		
Christian Bouckenooghe	35	2	1998	2009	Chile		1999 2003	
Michael Boxall	61	1	2011	2025	China		2017	
Nikko Boxall	6	0	2018	2022	Kenya			
Tyler Boyd	5	0	2014	2015	Japan			United States
Andrew Boyens	19	0	2007	2011	Wales	2010	2009	
Rex Boyes	6	0	1948	1951	Australia			
Steve Boyland	1	0	1973	1973	Iran			
Keith Braithwaite	1	0	1988	1988	Saudi Arabia			
Rewi Braithwaite	6	0	1922	1923	Australia			
Geoff Brand	11	2	1971	1973	New Caledonia			
Paddy Breslin	2	1	1967	1968	New Caledonia			
Ernie Bridge	1	0	1936	1936	Australia			
Dave Bright	8	0	1979	1982	Fiji	1982		
Kris Bright	5	1	2008	2013	Fiji		2009	
Jeremy Brockie	49	1	2006	2015	Malaysia	2010	2009	
Luke Brooke-Smith	1	0	2025	2025	Australia			
Sam Brotherton	12	0	2015	2018	Oman		2017	
Arthur Brown	1	0	1981	1981	United Arab Emirates			
Jeremy Brown	1	0	2000	2000	Malaysia			
Tim Brown	30	0	2004	2012	Solomon Islands	2010	2009	
Bill Brownlee	4	0	1922	1923	Australia			
Steven Bruce	3	0	1969	1969	New Caledonia			
Walter Brundell	2	0	1922	1922	Australia			
Paul Brydon	1	0	1986	1986	Fiji			
Che Bunce	29	2	1998	2007	Vanuatu		1999	
David Burgess	4	0	1983	1984	Ghana			
Joe Burke	1	0	1927	1927	Canada			
Mark Burton	27	6	1997	2003	China		1999 2003	
Jake Butler	2	0	2013	2013	Saudi Arabia			
Sean Byrne	5	0	1984	1985	Fiji			
Liberato Cacace	35	1	2018	2025	Taiwan			
Alex Caldwell	1	0	1967	1967	Singapore			
Joe Callaghan	2	0	1960	1960	Tahiti			
Graeme Cameron	2	0	1990	1990	China			
Henry Cameron	5	0	2015	2018	Oman			
Paul Cameron	2	0	1972	1972	New Caledonia			
Clive Campbell	17	5	1977	1981	New Caledonia			
George Campbell	6	7	1922	1923	Australia			
Jeff Campbell	16	5	2000	2007	Jamaica			
Jim Campbell	2	0	1927	1927	Canada			
Allan Carville	4	0	1988	1991	Fiji			
Stan Cawtheray	2	0	1936	1936	Australia			
Joe Champness	9	0	2021	2023	Bahrain			
Bill Chapman	4	2	1933	1936	Australia			
Harold Chapman	1	0	1936	1936	Australia			
Dennis Charlton	3	0	1954	1954	Australia			
Ted Charlton	2	3	1960	1960	Tahiti			
David Chote	4	0	1986	1988	Fiji			
Jeremy Christie	27	1	2005	2013	Australia	2010	2009	
Jim Christie	3	0	1933	1933	Australia			
Tinoi Christie	15	1	1997	1999	Indonesia			
Aaron Clapham	13	0	2011	2013	Honduras			
Ossie Cleal	3	0	1936	1947	Australia			
Duncan Cole	58	4	1978	1988	Singapore	1982		
Elliot Collier	2	0	2019	2019	Republic of Ireland			
Glen Collins	3	0	2002	2002	Solomon Islands			
Kip Colvey	15	0	2016	2017	Fiji		2017	
Fin Conchie	1	0	2024	2024	Solomon Islands			
Ted Cook	3	4	1922	1922	Australia			
Chad Coombes	1	0	2010	2010	Mexico			
Tim Cooper	8	0	1951	1954	New Caledonia			
Wattie Cooper	2	0	1927	1927	Canada			
Jock Corbett	3	0	1922	1922	Australia			
Mark Cossey	2	0	1988	1988	Fiji			
Perry Cotton	10	1	1992	1995	Fiji			
Vaughan Coveny	64	29	1992	2006	Fiji		1999 2003	
Jim Cowe	1	0	1936	1936	Australia			
Roy Coxon	8	10	1951	1952	New Caledonia			
Don Crabb	2	0	1933	1933	Australia			
Fred Craggs	1	0	1936	1936	Australia			
Reg Craxton	6	0	1922	1923	Australia			
Kenny Cresswell	33	2	1978	1987	Singapore	1982		
Max Crocombe	21	0	2018	2025	Kenya			
Kevin Curtin	18	0	1972	1977	Australia			
George Cuthill	2	1	1958	1958	Australia			
Ces Dacre	4	2	1922	1923	Australia			1st Class Cricket; 1914-1936
Phil Dando	2	0	1973	1975	Iran			
Ray Davey	4	0	1947	1947	South Africa			
Sandy Davie	11	0	1979	1981	Fiji			Scotland U-23
Alex Davis	3	0	1952	1952	Fiji			
Gerard Davis	23	0	2000	2003	Vanuatu		2003	
Grahame Davis	1	0	1968	1968	New Caledonia			
Max Davis	1	0	1973	1973	Australia			
Willem de Graaf	22	7	1969	1981	New Caledonia			
Raf de Gregorio	23	2	2000	2006	China		2003	
Andre de Jong	11	2	2018	2025	Canada			
Fred de Jong	21	3	1984	1993	Malaysia			
Francis de Vries	16	1	2021	2025	Gambia			
Ryan de Vries	1	0	2015	2015	South Korea			
Nigel Debenham	4	0	1978	1989	Singapore			
Andy Deeley	4	6	1986	1987	Australia			
Glenn Dods	22	0	1976	1982	Thailand	1982		
Sean Douglas	26	0	1995	2001	Vanuatu		1999	
Tom Doyle	11	0	2014	2018	Uzbekistan		2017	
Greg Draper	1	0	2008	2008	Fiji			
John Dryden	1	0	1923	1923	Australia			
George Drylie	1	0	1947	1947	South Africa			
Malcolm Dunford	41	5	1980	1993	Kuwait			
Ross Durant	4	0	1980	1980	Fiji			
Andrew Durante	24	0	2013	2017	Solomon Islands		2017	
Moses Dyer	11	1	2015	2018	South Korea			
Gary Eccles	1	0	1962	1962	New Caledonia			
Declan Edge	26	1	1985	1991	Fiji			
Thomas Edge	7	1	1991	1995	Australia			
Alistair Elder	5	3	1980	1980	Fiji			
Daniel Ellensohn	1	0	2007	2007	Vanuatu			
Callan Elliot	7	0	2023	2025	China			
Simon Elliott	69	6	1995	2011	Singapore	2010	2003 2009	
Adrian Elrick	53	1	1975	1984	China	1982		
Mark Elrick	30	4	1995	2000	Singapore		1999	
Alun Evans	17	0	1992	1995	Fiji			
Ceri Evans	56	2	1980	1993	Kuwait			
Tony Evans	2	0	1962	1962	New Caledonia			
Rory Fallon	24	6	2009	2016	Jordan	2010		
Tommy Farnan	1	0	1936	1936	Australia			
Martin Felton	2	0	1984	1984	Fiji			
Louis Fenton	7	0	2013	2016	Mexico			
Malcolm Ferguson	9	0	1968	1973	Fiji			
Jim Ferrier	2	1	1967	1967	Australia			
Tony Ferris	13	0	1988	1991	Saudi Arabia			
Don Finlayson	1	0	1988	1988	Saudi Arabia			
Brent Fisher	9	4	2002	2006	Estonia			
Michael Fitzgerald	3	0	2011	2011	China			
Ken Fleet	6	3	1951	1951	New Caledonia			
Warren Fleet	14	0	1972	1977	Indonesia			
Jeff Fleming	3	0	2006	2006	Malaysia			
Mark Foy	3	0	1997	1998	Indonesia			
Ken France	5	0	1967	1973	Singapore			
Matthew Garbett	36	5	2021	2025	Curaçao			
Keith Garland	7	0	1984	1984	Malaysia			
Peter Gerrard	3	0	1933	1933	Australia			
Keith Gibson	1	0	1954	1954	Australia			
Allan Gilgrist	1	0	1986	1986	Fiji			
Iain Gillies	1	0	1967	1967	New Caledonia			
Liam Gillion	2	0	2024	2024	Vanuatu			
Jake Gleeson	8	0	2011	2014	Australia			
Ross Goodacre	1	0	1997	1997	Indonesia			
Merv Gordon	4	0	1936	1947	Australia			
Clint Gosling	39	0	1984	1993	Fiji			
Tony Gowans	3	0	1967	1967	Australia			
Liam Graham	4	0	2016	2016	Mexico			
Tony Graham	3	0	1933	1933	Australia			
Rodger Gray	39	4	1989	1997	Australia			
Alex Greive	14	2	2022	2024	Jordan			
Graham Griffiths	12	0	1969	1975	New Caledonia			
Michael Groom	20	5	1980	1984	Fiji			
Les Groves	2	0	1933	1933	Australia			
Matt Guildea	6	0	1969	1969	New Caledonia			
Justin Gulley	3	0	2018	2018	Kenya			
Joe Habets	1	0	1967	1967	New Caledonia			
Kevin Hagan	11	5	1985	1987	Fiji			
Reg Haggett	1	1	1936	1936	Australia			
Neil Haines	1	0	1978	1978	Singapore			
Syd Haines	1	0	1936	1936	Australia			
Paul Halford	7	3	1987	1988	Samoa			
Peter Hall	3	0	1948	1948	Australia			
Danny Halligan	36	5	1987	1993	Australia			
John Hanson	4	0	1988	1988	Chinese Taipei			
Brian Hardman	9	1	1971	1973	New Caledonia			
Kenny Harlock	1	0	1997	1997	Papua New Guinea			
Neil Harlock	9	0	1995	1997	Chile			
Bill Harris	6	0	1980	1980	South Korea			
Pat Harris	5	0	1947	1948	South Africa			
Iain Hastie	6	1	1971	1972	New Caledonia			
Jack Hatchard	1	0	1936	1936	Australia			
Danny Hay	31	2	1996	2007	Oman		2003	NZ Manager 2019–2022
Terry Haydon	2	1	1968	1968	Fiji			
Craig Henderson	2	0	2013	2013	Trinidad and Tobago			
Peter Henry	7	0	1983	1985	Australia			
Ricki Herbert	61	7	1980	1989	Mexico	1982		NZ Manager 2005-2013
Noah Hickey	33	3	1997	2007	Papua New Guinea		2003	
Jason Hicks	1	0	2014	2014	South Africa			
Bert Hiddlestone	3	0	1954	1954	Australia			
Liam Higgins	1	0	2015	2015	Myanmar			
John Hill	17	0	1980	1982	Mexico	1982		
Dick Hislop	2	1	1927	1927	Canada			
Keith Hobbs	8	0	1980	1985	Fiji			
Ray Hodgson	4	0	1948	1948	Australia			
Ian Hogg	6	1	2012	2013	El Salvador			
Bill Hooper	2	1	1927	1927	Canada			
Leo Hope-Ede	8	1	1951	1952	New Caledonia			
Greg Hough	1	1	1977	1977	New Caledonia			
Ken Hough	5	0	1958	1958	Australia			Black Caps 1959; Australia, 1957
David Houghton	1	0	1969	1969	New Caledonia			
John Houghton	15	2	1971	1977	New Caledonia			
Cameron Howieson	21	2	2012	2024	El Salvador			
Te Atawhai Hudson-Wihongi	8	0	2015	2018	Oman			
Bill Hume	5	6	1958	1958	Australia			Australia, 1959
Bill Hunter	6	0	1968	1969	Fiji			
Jimmy Hunter	3	0	1954	1954	Australia			
Howard Hutchinson	4	0	1947	1948	South Africa			
Dane Ingham	13	0	2017	2023	Fiji		2017	
Jai Ingham	4	0	2017	2018	Fiji			
Arthur Inglis	2	0	1962	1962	New Caledonia			
Bob Innes	7	1	1923	1936	Australia			
Ken Ironside	1	0	1967	1967	New Caledonia			
Robert Ironside	31	6	1987	1993	China			
Bill Ives	2	0	1936	1936	Australia			
Charles Ives	2	1	1933	1933	Australia			
Chris Jackson	60	10	1992	2003	Fiji		1999 2003	
Stu Jacobs	16	0	1988	1997	Fiji			
Chris James	19	2	2006	2014	Brazil		2009	
Gary Jenkins	1	0	1979	1979	Bahrain			
Martin Jennison	2	0	1988	1988	Chinese Taipei			
Jack Jepson	1	0	1936	1936	Australia			
Praven Jeram	9	0	1971	1977	New Caledonia			
Dan Jones	6	0	1922	1927	Australia			
Lee Jones	5	0	2002	2002	Papua New Guinea			
Michael Jones	4	0	1969	1969	New Caledonia			
Neil Jones	2	2	2004	2004	Tahiti			
Carl Jorgensen	1	0	1991	1991	Australia			
Elijah Just	40	8	2019	2025	Republic of Ireland			
Kelvin Kalua	3	0	2021	2021	Curaçao			
Murray Kay	4	1	1933	1936	Australia			
Ron Kearns	4	0	1958	1958	Australia			
Dan Keat	7	0	2012	2014	Jamaica			
Lukas Kelly-Heald	5	0	2024	2025	Solomon Islands			
John Kemp	4	0	1960	1962	Tahiti			1st Class Cricket
Don Kendrick	5	4	1952	1952	Fiji			
Bill Kennedy	1	0	1967	1967	New Caledonia			
Jim Kershaw	3	4	1933	1933	Australia			
Jack Kidd	1	0	1948	1948	Australia			
Chris Killen	48	16	2000	2013	Tahiti	2010	2003 2009	
Bob King	3	0	1948	1948	Australia			
Reg King	1	1	1954	1954	Australia			
Niko Kirwan	10	1	2021	2023	Curaçao			
Imre Kiss	1	0	1967	1967	New Caledonia			
Joe Kissock	3	0	1923	1923	Australia			
Bill Knott	1	1	1922	1922	Australia			
Tony Laffey	1	0	1958	1958	New Caledonia			
Alex Laing	1	0	1948	1948	Australia			
Gary Lake	10	0	1967	1973	Australia			
George Lamont	1	0	1967	1967	New Caledonia			
Doug Lapwood	5	0	1958	1958	Australia			
Colin Latimour	20	1	1967	1973	Australia			
Tony Laus	3	3	1992	1992	Vanuatu			
John Legg	12	2	1967	1975	Australia			
John Leijh	14	0	1979	1984	Fiji			
Arthur Leong	2	0	1962	1962	New Caledonia			
Eric Lesbirel	2	0	1977	1977	New Caledonia			
Andy Leslie	1	0	1936	1936	Australia			
Tony Levy	6	0	1988	1989	Chinese Taipei			
Clayton Lewis	27	1	2015	2024	South Korea		2017	
Grant Lightbown	1	0	1991	1991	Australia			
Cameron Lindsay	1	0	2013	2013	Solomon Islands			
Aaran Lines	31	4	1996	2004	Tahiti		1999 2003	
Greg Little	4	1	1985	1988	Fiji			
Tony Lochhead	47	1	2003	2013	Iran	2010	2009	
Garry Lund	15	1	1986	1993	Fiji			
Keith Mackay	36	1	1980	1994	Mexico	1982		
Charles Mackie	1	0	1936	1936	Australia			
Sam Malcolmson	15	2	1976	1982	Burma	1982		
Stefan Marinovic	30	0	2015	2022	South Korea		2017	
Alan Marley	12	3	1972	1973	New Caledonia			
Graham Marshall	10	0	1995	1997	Singapore			
Iain Marshall	3	0	1981	1981	India			
Ken Mason	4	1	1947	1947	South Africa			
Tommy Mason	4	0	1989	1989	Israel			
Ian Masson	4	0	1980	1983	Burma			
Arthur Masters	1	1	1948	1948	Australia			
Max Mata	14	2	2019	2024	Lithuania			
George McAnulty	1	0	1952	1952	Fiji			
Neil McArthur	2	0	1922	1923	Australia			
Robert McAuley	6	0	1922	1923	Australia			
Tom McCabe	5	0	1958	1958	Australia			
Darren McClennan	43	12	1986	1997	Fiji			
Billy McClure	30	5	1981	1986	India	1982		
Tom McCormack	2	1	1927	1927	Canada			
Callum McCowatt	28	4	2019	2025	Republic of Ireland			
Jim McDougall	4	0	1927	1927	Canada			
Paddy McFarlane	7	0	1958	1960	Australia			
James McGarry	5	0	2019	2025	Lithuania			
Michael McGarry	55	12	1986	1997	Fiji			
Adam McGeorge	2	0	2012	2012	Honduras			
Les McGirr	4	0	1927	1927	Canada			
Michael McGlinchey	55	5	2009	2019	Jordan	2010	2017	
Dave McKissock	9	1	1948	1951	Australia			
George McLaren	3	1	1958	1958	Australia			
Kelly McLoughlin	1	0	1995	1995	Singapore			
Tom McNab	5	0	1967	1969	Australia			
Archie McQuarrie	1	0	1936	1936	Australia			
Don McRae	1	0	1936	1936	Australia			Black Caps 1946
Duncan McVey	1	2	1962	1962	New Caledonia			
Ray Mears	10	3	1967	1969	Australia			
Wally Meehan	4	0	1951	1951	New Caledonia			
Tom Methven	3	0	1948	1948	Australia			
Alex Metzger	10	1	1979	1984	Fiji			
Jim Middleton	2	0	1960	1960	Tahiti			
Adam Mitchell	4	0	2018	2018	Canada			
John Morris	8	0	1971	1973	New Caledonia			
Robert Morrison	10	0	1951	1952	New Caledonia			
Glen Moss	29	0	2006	2014	Malaysia	2010	2009 2017	
Jim Moyes	6	0	1969	1969	New Caledonia			
Tony Moynihan	2	0	1960	1960	Tahiti			
Kevin Mulgrew	12	1	1975	1976	China			
Dave Mulligan	28	3	2002	2011	Estonia	2010	2003 2009	
Richard Mulligan	24	0	1985	1988	Fiji			
James Musa	3	0	2014	2017	South Africa			
Jim Mutimer	3	1	1951	1951	New Caledonia			
Tim Myers	3	0	2012	2012	Papua New Guinea			
Ryan Nelsen	49	6	1999	2012	Poland	2010	1999 2003	
Keith Nelson	20	16	1977	1983	New Caledonia			
Istvan Nemet	4	2	1967	1967	Australia			
Jason New	6	0	1996	1996	China			
Jock Newall	10	16	1951	1952	New Caledonia			
Geordie Newman	4	0	1927	1927	Canada			
Heremaia Ngata	28	3	1993	2001	Saudi Arabia		1999	
Ross Nicholson	13	0	1998	2006	Vanuatu		1999	
Billy Nicolle	1	0	1927	1927	Canada			
Paul Nixon	4	0	1988	1993	Chinese Taipei			
Owen Nuttridge	2	0	1967	1975	Malaysia			
Ben Old	19	2	2022	2025	Papua New Guinea			
Steven Old	17	1	2004	2009	Australia		2009	
Ken Olley	3	0	1954	1954	Australia			
Peter O'Malley	2	0	1947	1948	South Africa			
Bert Ormond	2	1	1962	1962	New Caledonia			
Duncan Ormond	7	1	1979	1980	Australia			
Ian Ormond	10	5	1972	1976	New Caledonia			
Doug Ottley	6	0	1948	1951	Australia			
Duncan Oughton	25	2	2002	2009	Tahiti		2003 2009	
Garry Paddison	1	0	1975	1975	Macau			
Ian Park	20	0	1973	1980	Iran			
Owen Parker-Price	3	0	2025	2025	Poland			
Mark Paston	36	0	1997	2013	Indonesia	2010	2003 2009	
Monty Patterson	15	1	2016	2017	Fiji		2017	
Phil Patterson	1	0	1997	1997	Indonesia			
Alex Paulsen	5	0	2024	2025	Solomon Islands			
Tim Payne	47	3	2012	2025	Honduras			
Allan Pearce	1	0	2008	2008	New Caledonia			
Graham Pearce	3	0	2000	2000	Malaysia			
Jonathan Perry	28	2	1998	2002	Chile		1999	
Graeme Petersen	1	0	1967	1967	New Caledonia			
Cole Peverley	1	0	2008	2008	Fiji			
Francis Phelan	5	0	1980	1980	Kuwait			
Derek Phillips	6	0	1968	1969	New Caledonia			
Barry Pickering	11	0	1978	1984	Singapore	1982		
Nando Pijnaker	23	0	2019	2024	Lithuania			
Frits Poelman	2	0	1958	1958	New Caledonia			
Vic Pollard	7	0	1968	1972	Fiji			Black Caps 1965-1973
Luka Prelevic	3	0	2016	2016	Fiji			
Alan Preston	3	0	1954	1954	Australia			1st Class Cricket; 1955-1963
James Pritchett	6	0	2006	2008	Malaysia			
Paul Probert	4	0	1988	1988	Saudi Arabia			
Trefor Pugh	1	2	1962	1962	New Caledonia			
Rupesh Puna	2	0	2003	2004	Iran			
Bob Quickenden	5	2	1952	1952	Fiji			
John Raat	2	3	1960	1960	Tahiti			
John Rae	1	0	1962	1962	New Caledonia			
Jesse Randall	7	1	2024	2025	Solomon Islands			
Tom Randles	4	0	1973	1973	Indonesia			
Harshae Raniga	1	0	2015	2015	Myanmar			
David Rayner	1	0	2000	2000	Vanuatu			
Rodney Reid	2	0	1958	1958	Australia			1st Class Cricket
Winston Reid	33	1	2010	2022	Australia	2010		
Paul Rennell	4	0	1967	1967	Australia			
Andy Rennie	13	1	1995	1997	Chile			
Matthew Ridenton	6	0	2014	2019	South Africa			
Michael Ridenton	14	0	1988	1995	Chinese Taipei			
Chris Riley	16	0	1988	1993	Australia			
Duncan Ritchie	2	0	1962	1962	New Caledonia			
Brian Roberts	2	1	1991	1991	Australia			
George Robinson	1	0	1947	1947	South Africa			
Logan Rogerson	16	1	2015	2025	Honduras			
Marco Rojas	46	5	2011	2023	China		2017	
Storm Roux	18	0	2013	2025	Mexico		2017	
Gareth Rowe	7	0	1997	2000	Papua New Guinea			
Luke Rowe	1	0	2013	2013	Solomon Islands			
Alex Rufer	23	0	2015	2025	Myanmar		2017	
Shane Rufer	8	2	1979	1985	Fiji			
Wynton Rufer	23	12	1980	1997	Kuwait	1982		
Rupert Ryan	2	2	1998	1998	Vanuatu			
Oliver Sail	9	0	2022	2023	Papua New Guinea			
Tony Scheirlinck	3	0	1981	1981	Indonesia			
Grant Schofield	2	0	1991	1996	England			
Aaron Scott	5	0	2009	2013	Thailand		2009	
Brad Scott	2	1	2000	2000	Oman			
Blair Scoullar	1	0	2000	2000	Oman			
Jamie Searle	1	0	2022	2022	New Caledonia			
Brian Sergent	1	0	1948	1948	Australia			
Jack Sharp	4	0	1947	1948	South Africa			
Colin Shaw	5	8	1967	1968	Australia			
Tony Sibley	48	0	1972	1981	New Caledonia			
Neville Siebert	6	0	1967	1968	Australia			
Ben Sigmund	32	2	2000	2014	New Caledonia	2010	2009	
Mike Simeonoff	4	0	1976	1981	South Korea			
Peter Simonsen	11	1	1978	1985	Singapore	1982		
Craig Simpson	2	0	1986	1986	Fiji			
Reg Singer	1	0	1948	1948	Australia			
Sarpreet Singh	26	3	2018	2025	Canada			
Jack Skinner	2	1	1936	1936	Australia			
Shane Smeltz	58	24	2003	2017	United States	2010	2003 2009 2017	
Alex Smith	1	0	1973	1973	Iran			
Alf Smith	2	0	1936	1936	Australia			
Allan Smith	2	1	1954	1954	Australia			
Dennis Smith	5	0	1952	1952	Fiji			
Gordon Smith	6	7	1947	1948	South Africa			
Jarrod Smith	12	0	2006	2009	Malaysia		2009	
Lankford Smith	2	0	1948	1948	Australia			
Roger Smith	1	0	1948	1948	Australia			
Scott Smith	28	0	1998	2003	Chile		1999 2003	
Tommy Smith	56	2	2010	2024	Mexico	2010	2017	
Vic Smith	6	0	1947	1948	South Africa			
Ray Speed	6	0	1936	1947	Australia			
Harry Spencer	2	1	1927	1927	Canada			
Jacob Spoonley	2	0	2008	2013	Fiji			
John Staines	13	0	1968	1973	Fiji			
Marko Stamenić	35	3	2021	2025	Curaçao			
Alf Stamp	4	0	1979	1979	Australia			
Charlie Steele Jr.	8	6	1954	1958	Australia			
Charlie Steele Sr.	2	0	1927	1927	Canada			
Alex Stenhouse	3	0	1933	1933	Australia			
Jim Stephenson	10	0	1951	1952	New Caledonia			
Joel Stevens	3	0	2014	2015	Uzbekistan			
Tim Stevens	4	1	1997	1997	Papua New Guinea			
Josh Stick	1	0	2000	2000	Jamaica			
Lee Stickland	2	0	1980	1980	Fiji			
Ron Stone	2	0	1933	1933	Australia			
Graham Storer	7	0	1975	1976	China			
Jeff Strom	14	0	1980	1983	Kuwait			
Alan Stroud	3	0	1986	1995	Fiji			
Steve Sumner	58	22	1976	1988	Burma	1982		
Finn Surman	15	2	2023	2025	Greece			
Alex Sutherland	1	0	1936	1936	Australia			
Sam Sutton	5	0	2024	2024	Solomon Islands			
Dave Taylor	47	10	1967	1981	South Vietnam			
Jonathon Taylor	1	0	2001	2001	Cook Islands			
Bill Thomas	2	0	1923	1923	Australia			
Earle Thomas	23	7	1967	1976	Australia			
Ryan Thomas	23	3	2014	2025	Japan		2017	
Maurice Tillotson	15	1	1972	1975	New Caledonia			
Dennis Tindall	21	5	1971	1976	New Caledonia			
Jack Tinkler	2	0	1927	1927	Canada			
Joe Todd	2	0	1936	1936	Australia			
Phil Traynor	11	0	1948	1954	Australia			
Colin Tuaa	9	1	1983	1988	Japan			
Bill Tuiloma	47	4	2013	2025	Trinidad and Tobago		2017	
Brian Turner	59	21	1967	1982	Australia	1982		
Chris Turner	8	1	1979	1980	Fiji			
Grant Turner	42	14	1980	1988	Mexico	1982		
Nik Tzanev	2	0	2018	2023	Taiwan			
Themistoklis Tzimopoulos	14	1	2015	2017	South Korea		2017	
Ian Upchurch	4	0	1952	1952	Fiji			
Paul Urlovic	27	5	1998	2006	Vanuatu		1999	
Michael Utting	14	0	1993	2003	Fiji		1999 2003	
Benjamin van den Broek	1	0	2015	2015	South Korea			
Theo van den Broek	5	0	1958	1958	Australia			
Frank van Hattum	28	0	1980	1990	Fiji	1982		NZF Chairman 2008–2015
Oskar van Hattum	2	0	2024	2024	Solomon Islands			
John van Helden	1	0	1980	1980	Indonesia			
Riki van Steeden	5	1	1997	1997	Fiji			
Johan Verweij	5	1	1979	1983	Australia			
Alan Vest	17	6	1972	1973	New Caledonia			
Ivan Vicelich	88	6	1995	2013	Uruguay	2010	1999 2003 2009	
Nik Viljoen	10	2	1996	1997	Oman			
Kayne Vincent	1	0	2014	2014	Thailand			
Ben Waine	28	8	2022	2025	Papua New Guinea			
Colin Walker	15	10	1984	1988	Fiji			
David Wallace	5	0	1962	1968	New Caledonia			
Ivan Walsh	4	4	1951	1951	New Caledonia			
Des Warman	2	0	1948	1948	Australia			
Jim Warrender	2	0	1960	1960	Tahiti			
Adrian Webster	5	0	2005	2006	Australia			
Garry Welch	3	0	1980	1980	Fiji			
Bill Westerveld	3	0	1954	1954	Australia			
Kevin Weymouth	12	1	1975	1977	China			
John White	5	3	1952	1952	Fiji			
Peter Whiting	2	0	1962	1962	New Caledonia			
Dalton Wilkins	3	0	2022	2023	Jordan			
Alan Wilkinson	1	0	1947	1947	South Africa			
Gavin Wilkinson	33	1	1996	2002	Singapore		1999 2003	
Tamati Williams	1	0	2013	2013	South Africa		2017	
Bob Wilson	1	0	1948	1948	Australia			
Michael Wilson	7	0	2003	2006	Iran		2003	
Richard Wilson	25	0	1979	1984	Australia	1982		
Dave Witteveen	5	0	1986	1989	Fiji			
Chris Wood	88	45	2009	2025	Tanzania	2010	2009 2017	
Les Wood	5	1	1936	1947	Australia			
Steve Wooddin	24	11	1980	1984	Mexico	1982		
Billy Woods	3	0	1947	1947	South Africa			
Michael Woud	6	0	2018	2023	India			
John Wrathall	2	0	1960	1960	Tahiti			
Billy Wright	15	9	1988	1993	Saudi Arabia			
George Wright	1	0	1936	1936	Australia			
Deklan Wynne	16	0	2014	2022	China		2017	
Chris Zoricich	57	1	1988	2003	Israel		1999 2003	
Bill Zuill	3	0	1933	1933	Australia			

== See also ==
- List of New Zealand women's international footballers
- List of New Zealand sportspeople
