= List of New Zealand men's international footballers born outside New Zealand =

This is a list of foreign-born football players who played for the New Zealand men's national football team.

== Players ==
=== Alderney ===
- Gordon Barker

=== Australia ===
- Luke Adams
- Lachlan Bayliss
- Andrew Durante
- Liam Graham
- Ken Hough
- Dane Ingham
- Jai Ingham
- Luka Prelevic
- Tim Stevens

=== Burma ===
- Colin Latimour

=== China ===
- Arthur Leong

=== Cook Islands ===
- Christian Bouckenooghe

=== Croatia ===
- Adam Mitchell

=== England ===
- Martin Akers
- Bobby Almond
- Brian Armstrong
- Ken Armstrong
- Ron Armstrong
- Keith Barton
- Joe Bell
- Malcolm Bland
- Keith Braithwaite
- Geoff Brand
- Dave Bright
- Tim Brown
- Henry Cameron
- Stan Cawtheray
- Duncan Cole
- Ted Cook
- Perry Cotton
- Roy Coxon
- Phil Dando
- Greg Draper
- Ken France
- Matthew Garbett
- Keith Garland
- Clint Gosling
- Paul Halford
- Peter Hall
- Brian Hardman
- Jason Hicks
- David Houghton
- Arthur Inglis
- Dan Keat
- Eric Lesbirel
- Tony Levy
- Alan Marley
- Tommy Mason
- Billy McClure
- Ray Mears
- Kevin Mulgrew
- Dave Mulligan
- James Musa
- Geordie Newman
- Paul Nixon
- Doug Ottley
- Graham Pearce
- Vic Pollard
- James Pritchett
- Bob Quickenden
- Tommy Randles
- Chris Riley
- Luke Rowe
- Tommy Smith
- Harry Spencer
- Steve Sumner
- Maurice Tillotson
- Brian Turner
- Alan Vest
- Colin Walker
- Steve Wooddin
- Billy Wright
- Bill Zuill

=== Germany ===
- Shane Smeltz

=== Greece ===
- Themistoklis Tzimopoulos

=== Hungary ===
- Julius Beck
- Imre Kiss
- Istvan Nemet

=== India ===
- Praven Jeram

=== Ireland ===
- Sean Byrne
- Tommy Farnan
- Matt Guildea
- Tom McCabe

=== Kenya ===
- John Legg

=== Malaysia ===
- Declan Edge

=== Netherlands ===
- Willem de Graaf
- Nando Pijnaker
- Frits Poelman
- Benjamin van den Broek

=== Northern Ireland ===
- Noel Barkley
- Jim Bell
- Tony Ferris
- John Hill

=== Papua New Guinea ===
- Tinoi Christie

=== Samoa ===
- Rodney Reid

=== Scotland ===
- Jock Aird
- George Anderson
- Allan Boath
- Alex Caldwell
- Jim Christie
- George Cuthill
- Sandy Davie
- Grahame Davis
- Adrian Elrick
- Jim Ferrier
- Iain Gillies
- Iain Hastie
- Bill Hume
- Ken Ironside
- Murray Kay
- Joe Kissock
- George Lamont
- Andy Leslie
- Sam Malcolmson
- Iain Marshall
- Neil McArthur
- Jim McDougall
- Tom McNab
- Paddy McFarlane
- Duncan McVey
- Tom Methven
- Tony Moynihan
- Keith Nelson
- Jock Newall
- Bert Ormond
- Alf Stamp
- Charlie Steele Sr.
- Alex Stenhouse
- Joe Todd

=== South Africa ===
- Ryan De Vries
- Daniel Ellensohn
- Storm Roux
- Deklan Wynne

=== Switzerland ===
- Alex Rufer

=== United States ===
- Kip Colvey

=== Wales ===
- Finn Surman

== List by country of birth ==
England is the country where most of foreign-born New Zealand players were born.

| Birthplace | Players |
|---|---|
| England | 59 |
| Scotland | 34 |
| Australia | 9 |
| Ireland | 4 |
| Netherlands | 4 |
| Northern Ireland | 4 |
| South Africa | 4 |
| Hungary | 3 |
| Alderney | 1 |
| (Myanmar) Burma | 1 |
| China | 1 |
| Cook Islands | 1 |
| Croatia | 1 |
| Germany | 1 |
| Greece | 1 |
| India | 1 |
| Kenya | 1 |
| Malaysia | 1 |
| Papua New Guinea | 1 |
| Samoa | 1 |
| Switzerland | 1 |
| United States | 1 |
| Wales | 1 |
