= Seatoun =

Suburb of Wellington City, New Zealand

- Suburb
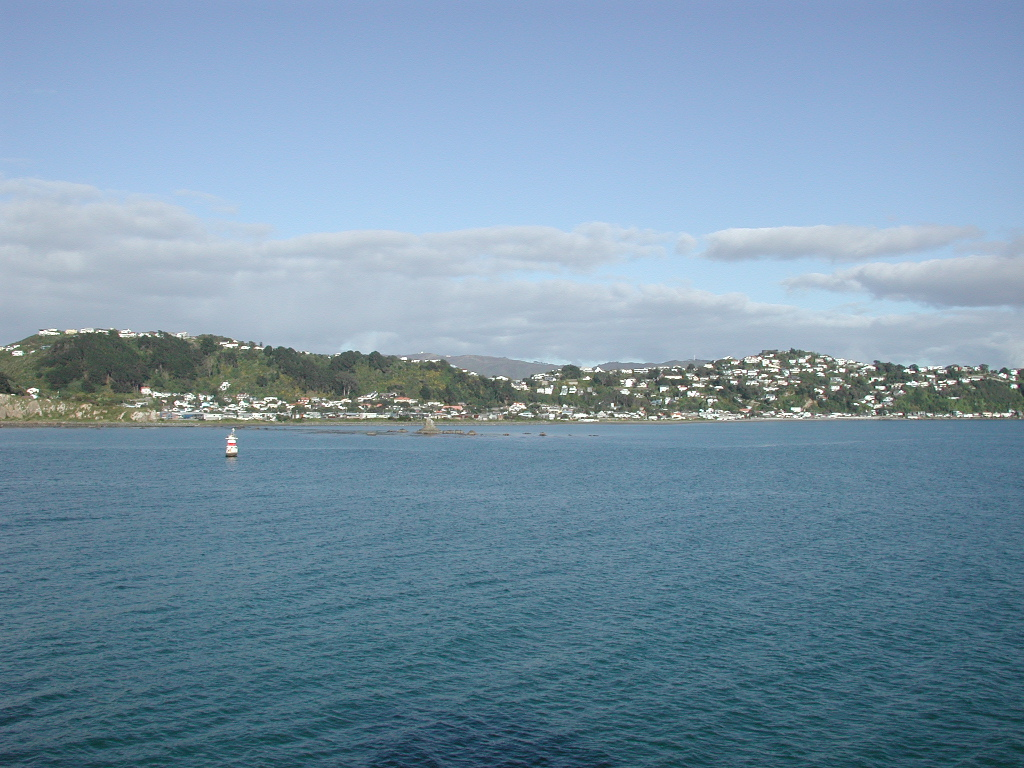
- Seatoun from Wellington Harbour entrance
- Interactive map of Seatoun
- Location within New Zealand Wellington
- Coordinates: 41.323°S 174.833°E
- Country: New Zealand
- City: Wellington City
- Local authority: Wellington City Council
- Electoral ward: Motukairangi/Eastern Ward; Te Whanganui-a-Tara Māori Ward
- Established: 1889

Area
  - Land: 133 ha (330 acres)

Population (June 2025)
  - Total: 2,210
  - Density: 1,660/km^{2} (4,300/sq mi)
- Ferry terminals: Seatoun Ferry terminal

Miramar	Worser Bay
	Seatoun	Wellington Harbour heads
Strathmore Park	Breaker Bay, Cook Strait

Seatoun is an eastern suburb of Wellington, the capital city of New Zealand and lies on the east coast of the Miramar Peninsula, close to the entrance to Wellington Harbour (Port Nicholson).

== Geography ==
The suburb sits on an exposed promontory close to Barrett Reef, a dangerous area of rocky shallows upon which many ships have foundered.

Seatoun as a suburb looks out on to Steeple Rock/Te Aroaro-o-Kupe, a large rock at the west of the Wellington Harbour entrance, rising 7 metres (23 ft) above sea level.

== History ==
=== Māori settlement ===
In Māori mythology, the first settlement of the surrounding area was by Māori, led by the semi-mythical explorer Tara, or more fully Tara-Ika i Nohu, who also gave his name to what's now Wellington (as Te Whanganui a Tara, or The Harbour of Tara) and the iwi Ngāi Tara. Oral tradition records that Tara and his people settled Matiu / Somes Island around 1100-1300 AD with an estimated 200 people. The group was broken into two, with one of these establishing a pā, named Te Whetū Kairangi, which takes its name from whetū "star" and kairangi "high status", overlooking Worser Bay.

In Ngāi Tara oral tradition, Seatoun is where the mythical Polynesian navigator, Kupe, is said to have first set ashore on his voyage to New Zealand, around 1000–1300 BC. Kupe is said to have settled for some time to grow crops at Maraenui, where Seatoun village centre now stands. From here he is said to have explored Raukawa Moana (Cook Strait).

Seatoun beach was named Te Turanganui o Kupe (The Great Standing Place of Kupe). He is said to have fished at Steeple Rock, where he hurt his groin whilst swimming, giving the name Te Aroaro o Kupe (The Groin of Kupe). A pouwhenua, designed by Rangi Hetet and located at the edge of Churchill Park, marks the significance of the location.

Much of what now comprises Seatoun did not exist as accessible land when first settled by Māori, which helps to explain why early pā in the area occupied hillside or hilltop sites. Hilltop sites were also easier to defend. At the time, what is now the Miramar Peninsula was disconnected from the mainland and existed as a separate island within the harbour, known after the first pā as Te Motu Kairangi (or The Exhalted Island). The island was connected to the land when lifted from the sea by the Haowhenua earthquake around 1460 AD. After earthquakes raised the foreshore, it was renamed Kirikirikatangi, after the rattling and rumbling caused by the waves disturbing gravel on the beach. Much of modern Seatoun then emerged. By 1500 AD Māori had largely deforested the land, and the sandy soils found in parts of the Miramar Peninsula would have been suitable for gardening.

A second pā was constructed in the Seatoun area during the 1700s, on the headland at the entrance to the harbour, in what is now the Oruaiti Reserve. This was built by Te Rerewa of the Rangitāne iwi, the descendants of Tara's brother Tautoki. Tradition records that this pā was later captured and occupied by Ngāti Kahungunu, and that it was once attacked by Māori from Whanganui with some 500 being routed and killed at nearby Worser Bay. The site is marked today by a 17-metre long sculpture of a 'waka' (traditional canoe), constructed in 2013.

In the 1820s and 1830s, a number of migrations saw the arrival to the area of Māori from elsewhere on the north island, prompted in large part because of ongoing conflict between iwi in Taranaki and Waikato. The first to settle around Wellington were Ngāti Mutunga and Ngāti Tama, and they were later joined by Te Ātiawa. Te Ātiawa re-occupied a number of their settlements around Wellington Harbour including Seatoun after the others departed to the Chatham Islands in 1835.

=== Early European activity (1773-1900) ===
European contact began when Captain James Cook anchored at Seatoun in 1773. However, it would take a further half century before the area secured any permanent European residents. The first two ships, the Rossana and the Lambton, arrived in 1826, disembarking on the Miramar Peninsula. On 20 September 1839, the New Zealand Company ship, the Tory, arrived in Wellington and negotiations commenced with the Te Ātiawa chiefs who occupied settlements around the harbour.

Amongst the first European people to settle the coastline area at what is now Seatoun was James Heberley. Heberley lived with his family at what became Worser Bay. He became pilot at the request of Colonel William Wakefield, who references him in his book Adventures in New Zealand, piloted the Tory into Wellington and drowned at Picton in 1899.

The headland was named Point Dorset after Wellington-based surgeon and politician John Dorset. A small military reserve had been set aside there in the subdivision of the peninsula in 1841, though construction of defensive positions focussed on the central town and no works began on the peninsula until 1885.

The name 'Seatoun' comes from a settlement in Forfarshire, Scotland, linked with the family history of James Coutts Crawford, the modern suburb's founder. Coutts Crawford was amongst the first permanent European settlers in Wellington. He arrived in September 1839 and set up a farm on the Miramar Peninsula. He bought further land deeds from the New Zealand Company in the 1840s and established a quarry site to the west of Breaker Bay. He named his holdings Overtoun and Seatoun, after family holdings of the Crawford family in Scotland. The area between Nevay and Karaka Bay roads and the old hilltop pā site was first called the Township of Overton.

Crawford was amongst the first colonial ethnographers and researchers of Māori history. His work focussed on the area he owned and involved documenting the early history of the area, as recounted to him by Māori. This included efforts to map locations of Māori occupation at Oruaiti (Point Dorset), as well as other nearby sites at Maupuia (Rongotai Ridge) and Te Mahanga (which he positioned near Point Halswell).

=== Suburban development (20th century) ===
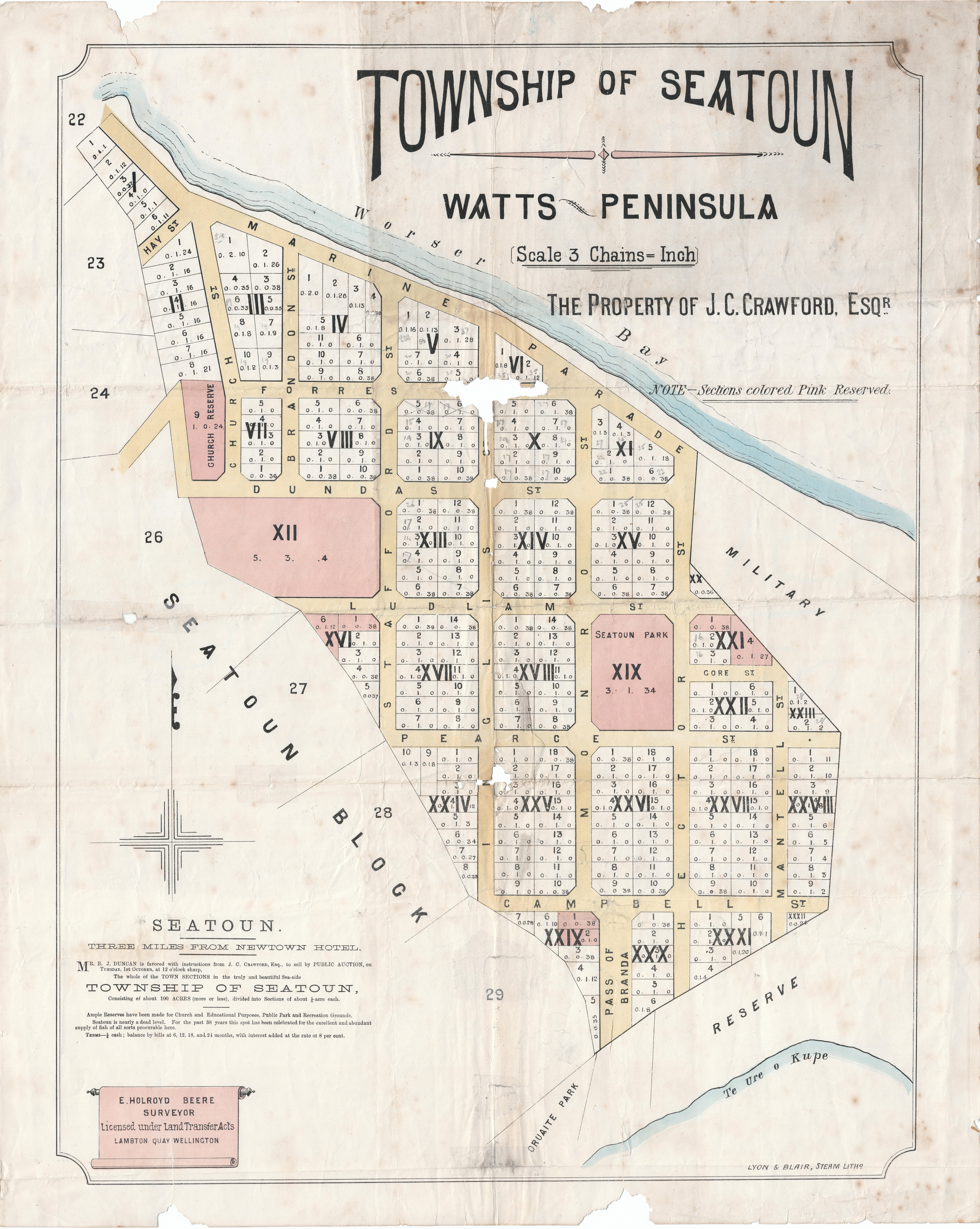
1878 map of proposed 'Township of Seatoun'

==== Access ====
European settlement properly began in Seatoun around 1900, although still constrained at that point by the fact that the area was accessible only by boat. The Seatoun Roads Board was formed in 1880 to agitate for improved transport to Seatoun and promote development in the area. It helped build Seatoun Wharf on Marine Parade, which opened in 1901. Ferries transported residents between Seatoun and Customhouse Quay in the city, but demand for travel by ferry collapsed after the Seatoun Tunnel opened in 1908 and a tram service commenced, and the ferry service ceased in 1913.

The main part of the wharf is 67 m (220 ft) long and the end, which bends to the left, is 30.5 m (100 ft) long.

Seatoun Tunnel was opened in 1908, linking the settlement to nearby Strathmore Park and Miramar. This enabled the expansion of Seatoun by connecting it to the city centre by electric tram. The tunnel measures 144m (470 feet) long, and 8.2m (27 feet) wide. At the time it opened it was said to be ‘the widest tunnel in Australasia’. The historian John Struthers established that the population of Seatoun was less than 1,000 at the time.

The Pass of Branda is a cutting linking Seatoun to Breaker Bay which was in use by the early 20th century.

==== Facilities ====
The first school in the district was Worser Bay School, which opened in 1897. Seatoun School was opened on 5 September 1918 at the intersection of Marine Parade and Falkirk Avenue to relieve congestion at Worser Bay School, which by then had over 400 students.

Seatoun AFC was founded in 1909, becoming one of the strongest football clubs in the country during the 1950s. It would go on to win the Chatham Cup in 1957 and 1958 (with the latter 7–1 final win over Christchurch City remaining the joint-highest in the history of the tournament) and produce at least 11 national 'All Whites' players.

Around 1910, a Seatoun scout group was established for boys in the community, and they got their own 'den' in a hall at 36 Ferry Street in 1930. The hall was partly financed by an interest-fee loan from a resident and partly by raising money through movie shows in the hall, which were commonplace until theatres opened in nearby Kilbirnie and Miramar. The 1st Seatoun Scouts hall was extended in 1963 to accommodate demand. It continued as an active group until the late 1990s when, due to declining membership, it merged with nearby Worser Bay Scouts to form the Eastern Bay Scouts and Sea Scouts. The combined troop (which now includes girls) continues to operate from the Worser Bay building. The unused Seatoun Scout Hall was damaged by fire in 2011 but has since been refurbished.

In 1917, The New Zealand Index proclaimed Seatoun to be:

A suburb of Wellington, at the Heads. Six miles southeast by daily ferry steamer (8 pence return) or by electric car (tram) from Welington [sic]. It is part of the Miramar borough. A favourite seaside resort. No hotel, but good boarding accommodation, stores, tearooms, post and telephone office. One mile from Worser Bay. Electric car opened to Seatoun on December 18, 1907. Nearby is the site of the Oruaiti pa, famous in Maori history. Favourite picnic resort is Breaker Bay, a few minutes walk from here.

By 1926, Seatoun was still in need of investment. Residents complained about open drains, said the streets had not been maintained since they were built and pointed out a third of the houses in were without proper roads or footpaths.

The settlement's first church service was organized in 1910 in a room at a butcher's shop on Worser Bay. This continued until 1913 when a group of 14 local residents raised funds for the construction of a Presbyterian church on Ventnor Street. That original building now serves as Seatoun Village Hall. It was replaced in 1932 by a new church, St Christopher's, designed by William Fielding, which was opened by the Governor General, Lord Bledisloe. The church contains the 'Wahine Cross', made from wood salvaged from the wreck of the TEV Wahine. The parish was closed in 2013 and the building sold in 2015 to local benefactors who now operate it as a community facility.

The Anglican church of St George was established on Ferry Street in 1946, with the current building, containing striking floral stained-glass windows, constructed in 1957.

In the early 1970s, Seatoun was home to Prime Minister Norman Kirk. His house is at the junction of Falkirk Avenue and Forres Street. A bench at the nearby junction of Falkirk Avenue and Marine Parade, where he would enjoy sitting on the seafront, was dedicated to his memory after his death. When the family later left Seatoun, Kirk's wife donated Seatoun School a model ship made entirely from cloves, which the Prime Minister had himself been gifted. The model remains on display at the school.

=== 21st century ===
Between 1999-2003, at broadly the same time as Fort Dorset was being redeveloped, the area around Point Dorset, which was established as the Oruaiti Reserve, was used extensively as a filming location for globally popular teenage drama The Tribe. Much of the filming took place at nearby Breaker Bay. In 2009, ownership of the headland was transferred to the Port Nicholson Settlement Block Trust.

Between 2012-2014, Seatoun was used as the backdrop for further filming and featured as the setting for the fictional seaside community of “The Bay” in teen drama Girl vs Boy. In 2016, it featured extensively in the film Chronesthesia.

From the 1990s, East by West ferries ran a service in the harbour that sometimes included stops at Seatoun. In 2021 Wellington City Council closed the wharf for 18 months for major repairs, and when it reopened East by West Ferries stated that they would no longer offer a service to Seatoun. The ferry company cited "increased running costs, passenger volumes, and scheduling issues" as the reason for the cancellation, saying that only one of their boats was able to berth at Seatoun in all tides.

== Fort Dorset ==
In 1911, shortly after the suburb became accessible by tunnel, work began on Fort Dorset, a military base on the headland to protect the entrance to Wellington Harbour. This followed construction of a two-gun battery on the top of the ridge at Point Dorset in 1908.

On 3 September 1939, Fort Dorset was the location from which the first shots were fired by British imperial forces during World War Two. Whilst distinct from the first shots fired in enemy action, which came when RAF Spitfires engaged a Heinkel He 111 over Scotland’s Firth of Forth on 16 October 1939, the rounds hold historic significance as the first fired after the conflict had officially begun (only eleven hours previously). The SS City of Delhi, a British refrigerated cargo vessel, was approaching Seatoun in-bound to Wellington under wartime conditions when hailed to stop by the New Zealand naval vessel HMNZS Janie Seddon. City of Delhi failed to respond and, following standard procedure, Fort Dorset’s 6‑inch guns on the Seatoun ridge fired two warning shots across her bow. One shot missed well whilst the other landed near enough to persuade the City of Delhi to comply and head alongside the Janie Seddon. Her captain was later fined £40 to cover the cost of the rounds fired.

Fort Dorset was closed in 1991, after almost a century of operation, and largely demolished in 1998. What remained was used temporarily in 1999 as the set for the town of ‘Bree’ and ‘The Prancing Pony Inn’ in The Lord of the Rings. Final redevelopment then came to deliver Seatoun Primary School in 2002.

Wahine anchor and chain, Seatoun memorial

== Wahine disaster ==
The suburb played an important role during the sinking of the inter-island ferry TEV Wahine in 1968, when the ship foundered off the shoreline. Only the four starboard lifeboats could be launched. One lifeboat was swamped shortly after leaving the sinking ship and its occupants were tossed into the sea. Of the other three, one landed at Eastbourne and two at Seatoun. Churchill Park in Seatoun contains a memorial to the disaster. The memorial is formed from one of the Wahine's anchor and chains, pointing towards its resting place just beyond Steeple Rock, with each link in the chain representing a victim of the tragedy. The area also contains replica ship ventilators. Visible to the east is Steeple Rock, only a few hundred metres from shore, where the Wahine capsized and sank.

== Demographics ==
Seatoun statistical area, which also includes Breaker Bay, covers 1.33 km^{2} (0.51 sq mi). It had an estimated population of 2,210 as of June 2025, with a population density of 1,662 people per km^{2}.

Historical population
Year	Pop.	±% p.a.
2006	2,139	—
2013	2,235	+0.63%
2018	2,319	+0.74%
2023	2,190	−1.14%

Seatoun had a population of 2,190 in the 2023 New Zealand census, a decrease of 129 people (−5.6%) since the 2018 census, and a decrease of 45 people (−2.0%) since the 2013 census. There were 1,092 males, 1,086 females, and 12 people of other genders in 804 dwellings. 4.4% of people identified as LGBTIQ+. The median age was 46.2 years (compared with 38.1 years nationally). There were 417 people (19.0%) aged under 15 years, 339 (15.5%) aged 15 to 29, 1,086 (49.6%) aged 30 to 64, and 348 (15.9%) aged 65 or older.

People could identify as more than one ethnicity. The results were 86.0% European (Pākehā); 8.2% Māori; 2.3% Pasifika; 12.3% Asian; 1.6% Middle Eastern, Latin American and African New Zealanders (MELAA); and 2.6% other, which includes people giving their ethnicity as "New Zealander". English was spoken by 98.1%, Māori by 2.2%, Samoan by 0.1%, and other languages by 18.1%. No language could be spoken by 1.2% (e.g. too young to talk). New Zealand Sign Language was known by 0.8%. The percentage of people born overseas was 29.3, compared with 28.8% nationally.

Religious affiliations were 29.6% Christian, 2.2% Hindu, 0.4% Islam, 0.5% Māori religious beliefs, 0.4% Buddhist, 0.3% New Age, 0.5% Jewish, and 1.2% other religions. People who answered that they had no religion were 60.1%, and 4.7% of people did not answer the census question.

Of those at least 15 years old, 930 (52.5%) people had a bachelor's or higher degree, 618 (34.9%) had a post-high school certificate or diploma, and 222 (12.5%) people exclusively held high school qualifications. The median income was $63,200, compared with $41,500 nationally. 618 people (34.9%) earned over $100,000 compared to 12.1% nationally. The employment status of those at least 15 was 897 (50.6%) full-time, 318 (17.9%) part-time, and 36 (2.0%) unemployed.

== Education ==
=== Seatoun School ===
Seatoun School is a co-educational state primary school for Year 1 to 8 students, with a roll of 383 as of July 2026. The school was opened in 1918 at Marine Parade. It relocated to a new facility on the old Fort Dorset New Zealand Army base in 2002, near the entrance to Wellington Harbour.

=== Other schools ===
St Anthony's School is a co-educational state-integrated Catholic primary school for Year 1 to 8 students, with a roll of 35. It opened in 1923.

Te Kura Kaupapa Māori o Nga Mokopuna is a co-educational state Māori language immersion school for Year 1 to 13 students, with a roll of 82. It opened in 1994 in central Wellington, and moved to the former Seatoun School site at Seatoun in 2002.

== Notable buildings ==
There are several buildings in the area which are either of architectural or historic significance; for example, by virtue of their designer or occupants. In particular:

- Frederick de Jersey Clere designed Our Lady Star of the Sea convent chapel on Fettes Crescent which opened in 1924 and is notable due to the innovative design and construction.
- William Fielding designed the heritage-listed, Romanesque Revival style, St Christopher's church, now a community centre.
- Ian Athfield designed several homes in the area, with examples at 93 and 95 Tio Tio Road (the former in his signature ‘Santorini’ style).
- David Launder, active in Wellington architecture in the 1970s and 1980s, designed properties at 91 Tio Tio Road, Ferry Street and his own ‘man overboard’ home at nearby Karaka Bay.
- Norman Kirk occupied the house at 30 Forres Street, built in 1931, as his prime ministerial residence.
- The Former Pilot’s Cottage, at 229 Marine Parade, is one of the oldest houses in Wellington and represents the earliest phase of European settlement in Seatoun.
- The Former Seatoun Scout Hut, at 38 Ferry Street, it is likely to be Wellington’s oldest purpose-built scout hall and served the Seatoun Scouts for over 60 years before the club merged.

== Notable people ==
There are various notable people who have lived in Seatoun at one point in their lives, or with connections to the area. These include:

- Sunny Amey, theatre director, grew up in Seatoun and attended Seatoun School.
- Kosta Barbarouses, footballer, lived in Seatoun whilst playing for Wellington Phoenix.
- Grahame Bilby, sportsman, played for Seatoun AFC.
- Orlando Bloom, actor, lived at nearby Karaka Bay whilst filming the Lord of the Rings series.
- Rex Boyes, footballer, played for Seatoun AFC.
- Nathalie Boltt, actress, lives at nearby Seatoun Heights.
- Melvin Day, artist, lived in Seatoun.
- Pat Evison, actress, was a long-time resident of Seatoun.
- Michael J. Fox, actor, lived in Seatoun whilst filming The Frighteners.
- Robert Gant, photographer, built a home in Seatoun and resided there for six years.
- Keith Gibson, footballer, played for Seatoun AFC.
- Bert Hiddlestone, footballer, played for Seatoun AFC.
- Helen Hughes, botanist and first Parliamentary Commissioner of the Environment, lived and died in Seatoun.
- Peter Jackson, film director, lives in Seatoun and owns several local properties.
- Alfred Jenkins, gymnast, played for Seatoun AFC.
- Scarlett Johansson, actress, has lived in Seatoun on several occasions whilst filming in New Zealand.
- Michael Jones, footballer, played for Seatoun AFC.
- Ron Kearns, footballer, played for Seatoun AFC.
- Miranda Kerr, model, lived at nearby Karaka Bay with husband Orlando Bloom.
- Norman Kirk, politician, lived in Seatoun whilst Prime Minister of New Zealand, until his death.
- Peter Leitch, businessman, began his career in Seatoun.
- Jonathan Manns, urbanist and developer, lives in Seatoun.
- Barbara Winifred Matthews, writer and horticulturalist, grew up in Seatoun.
- William McGirr, cricketer, lived and died in Seatoun.
- Ian McKellen, actor, lived in Seatoun whilst filming Lord of the Rings.
- Paul Middleditch, film director, grew up in Seatoun.
- Onny Parun, tennis player, lived in Seatoun.
- Rodney Reid, sportsman, played for Seatoun AFC.
- Duncan Ritchie, footballer, played for Seatoun AFC.
- Catherine Robertson, author, was a long-time resident of Seatoun.
- Brian Shorland, organic chemist, lived and died in Seatoun at Karaka Bay.
- Stephanie Sinclaire, theatre director, lived in Seatoun.
- Ted Thorne, rear admiral, was born in Seatoun.
- Phil Traynor, footballer, played for Seatoun AFC.
- Ian Upchurch, footballer, played for Seatoun AFC.
- Fran Walsh, screenwriter and producer, lives in Seatoun with husband Peter Jackson.
- Dean Wareham, musician, was born in Seatoun.
- Beverley Wakem, Chief Ombudsman, attended St Anthony’s Primary School.
- Naomi Watts, actress, lived in Seatoun whilst filming King Kong.
- Thomas Williams, cardinal and Archbishop of Wellington, attended Holy Cross Primary School.
