= Hungarian New Zealanders =

Hungarian New Zealanders Új-Zélandi Magyarok
Total population
- 1,788 (2023)

Regions with significant populations
- Auckland, Wellington, Christchurch, Dunedin, Tuatapere

Languages
- Hungarian, English

Religion
- Christianity, Roman Catholic, Reformed Christanity, Lutheran Christianity

Related ethnic groups
- Hungarian diaspora, Hungarian Australians, Hungarian Americans, Hungarian Canadians, Hungarians in the United Kingdom

Hungarian New Zealanders (Hungarian: új-zélandi magyarok) are people who have migrated from Hungary to New Zealand, and their descendants, if they choose to identify as such, as well as any people of Hungarian ethnicity who have migrated to New Zealand. Hungarian New Zealanders constitute a small minority of New Zealand's population. In the 2001 census in New Zealand, when asked to indicate their ethnic identity, 894 New Zealanders described themselves as "Hungarian", altogether 1,191 spoke Hungarian and 987 stated they were born in Hungary. In 2006, 1,476 people spoke Hungarian. In 2023, the number of people who identified with the hungarian ethnic group was 1,788 individuals.

== History ==
=== 19th century ===
Hungarians began to emigrate to New Zealand in the middle of the 19th century, but this was not a permanent settling. After the Hungarian Revolution in 1848 small groups arrived from Hungary, but also they travelled forward. In the 1860s there was a gold rush in Otago, again small groups arrived in New Zealand. One of them, Zsigmond Vékey, a lawyer became the journalist of Otago Daily Times. Later he went back to Hungary. The first permanent settlers came between 1872 and 1876, and some people later in the 19th century.

=== 20th century ===
In 1909 a certain man, named István Rácz arrived in Tuatapere, Southland. He wrote letters to his home in Csongrád, Hungary. Because of this, in 1911 three other families (the Szivák, Kollát and Kókay families) joined him from the city. During the next two decades still some families followed them, altogether approximately 100 families. Some of their descendants became famous: in 1970 István Kókay's son, Stephen Kokay was chosen as the representative of the Waiau district on the Wallace County Council. One of his daughters is a biologist, named Dr. Ilona Kokay, who teaches at the Otago University.His son Les Kokay is internationally recognised in music circles for his writings on Bob Dylan in ISIS magazine and other writings on Bob Dylan. He also invented the ‘LesK’ cube, a 3x3x3 cube puzzle. Mike Racz became a Guinness recorder as the fastest oyster opener.

In the beginning of the Second World War 55 Hungarians arrived, right after the war still 62. In the beginning of the 1950s another 136 Hungarians arrived in New Zealand. The largest group of refugees from Hungary, 1099 people, arrived after the 1956 Revolution. Most of them was settled in the main centres of Auckland, Wellington and Christchurch. One of them was Anna Porter (born Anna Szigethy), the novelist, who later moved to Canada. The fathers of Marton Csokas and Nándor Tánczos both were 1956-refugees. Tom Paulay, also a 1956-refugee, taught at the University of Canterbury. Until 1970 still 290 Hungarians settled down in New Zealand.

== Hungarian culture in New Zealand ==
In the 1980s there was movement to create cultural associations. In 2006 such societies exist in four cities: Auckland, Wellington, Christchurch and Dunedin. On 20 August 2006, Magyar Millennium Park was opened in Wellington, featuring an original Székely gate.

There is a quarterly newspaper for the Hungarians, the Magyar Szó ("Hungarian Word").

Horse archery, influenced by Hungarian horse archery, particularly the style popularised by Lajos Kassai, has in recent years made its way to New Zealand.

== Notable Hungarian New Zealanders ==
- Marton Csokas - actor, played in The Lord of the Rings and in the Kingdom of Heaven.
- Nándor Tánczos - cannabis advocate and former MP of the Parliament of New Zealand
- George Baloghy - artist, painter
- Imre Vallyon - writer
- Nick Horvath - naturalized basketball player
- Louis Fenton - New Zealand national football team player
- Sandor Earl - former rugby player
- Claire Szabó - politician, president of the New Zealand Labour Party
- Stephen Kós - judge

There was a Hungarian football club, called Hungaria, notable members were:

- Imre Kiss
- Julius Beck
- Istvan Nemet

== See also ==
- European New Zealanders
- Europeans in Oceania
- Hungarian Australians
- Immigration to New Zealand
- Pākehā
