= Arthur Leong =

Arthur Leong may refer to:

- Arthur Leong (judge) (1936–2010), Hong Kong judge
- Arthur Leong (footballer), New Zealand footballer
