= Keith Gibson =

Keith Gibson may refer to:

- Keith Gibson (footballer), New Zealand footballer
- Keith Gibson (serial killer), American serial killer
