= Peter Hall =

Peter Hall may refer to:

== Entertainment ==
- Peter Adolf Hall (1739–1793), Swedish-French artist
- Peter J. Hall (1926–2010), American costume designer
- Peter Hall (director) (1930–2017), English theatre director

== Religion ==
- Peter Hall (bishop) (1930–2013), bishop of Woolwich, 1984–1996
- Peter Hall (priest) (1803–1849), English cleric and topographer
- Peter Hall (minister) (1851–1937), Jamaican teacher, missionary and Presbyterian clergyman

== Sports ==
- Peter Hall (cricketer) (1927–2014), New Zealand cricketer
- Peter Hall (footballer, born 1939), English association football player
- Pete Hall (born 1939), American football player and con artist
- Peter Hall (Australian footballer) (born 1957), for South Melbourne
- Peter Hall (New Zealand footballer)
- Peter Hall (sailor) (born 1949), in yacht races

== Other ==
- Peter Hall (RNZAF officer) (1922–2010), New Zealand WWII pilot
- Peter Hall (architect) (1931–1994), Australian architect, known for completing the Sydney Opera House
- Peter Hall (urbanist) (1932–2014), English professor of urban planning
- Peter Hall (diplomat) (1938–2024), British ambassador to Argentina and Serbia
- Peter Dobkin Hall (1946–2015), American professor of history
- Peter W. Hall (1948–2021), American federal judge
- Peter Gavin Hall (1951–2016), Australian professor of mathematics
- Peter Hall (politician) (born 1952), Australian National Party member
- Peter Hall (financier) (born 1960), Australian financier
- Peter A. Hall, Canadian political scientist and comparative political economist
