= Tony Graham =

Tony Graham may refer to:

- Tony Graham (cyclist) (born 1962), New Zealand cyclist
- Tony Graham (New Zealand footballer), New Zealand international football (soccer) player
- Tony Graham (rugby league) (born 1950s), Australian rugby player
- Tony Graham (soccer) (born 1956), American professional football (soccer) player
- Tony Graham (tennis) (born 1956), former professional tennis player from the United States
- Tony Graham (swimmer), former swimming representative from New Zealand
