= Philip Traynor =

Philip Traynor may refer to:

- Philip A. Traynor, United States politician
- Phil Traynor, New Zealand international football (soccer) player
