= Van Helden =

Studio portrait of Toon van Helden

van Helden is a Dutch toponymic surname meaning "from Helden", a town in Dutch Limburg. Notable people with the surname include:

- Armand van Helden (born 1970), American musician, DJ and music producer
- Gerard Van Helden (1848–1901), Detective Superintendent in the Birmingham City Police
- Hans van Helden (born 1948), Dutch speed skater
- John van Helden (born 1950s), New Zealand footballer
- Marie-France van Helden (born 1959), French speed skater, wife of Hans van Helden
- Robin van Helden (born 1965), Dutch middle-distance runner
