= Habets =

Habets is a surname of Dutch-language origin. Notable people with the surname include:

- Joe Habets, New Zealand footballer
- Marie Louise Habets (1905–1986), Belgian nurse and nun, known for being the basis of The Nun's Story novel and film.
