= Duncan Ritchie =

Duncan Ritchie may refer to:

- Duncan Ritchie (New Zealand footballer) (fl. 1962)
- Duncan Ritchie (footballer, born 1886) (1886–1968), Scottish footballer
