= Warrender =

Warrender is a surname. Notable people with the surname include:

- Bobby Warrender (1929–2003), Scottish professional footballer
- Danny Warrender (born 1986), former English professional footballer
- Harold Warrender (1903–1953), British actor
- Jim Warrender (1931–2012), former football (soccer) player who represented New Zealand at international level
- John Warrender, 2nd Baron Bruntisfield MC OBE TD (1921–2007), Scottish soldier, farmer and Conservative politician
- Patrick Warrender (1731–1799), Scottish soldier and politician
- Sir George Warrender, 1st Baronet (1658–1722), Scottish merchant and politician
- Sir George Warrender, 4th Baronet PC, FRS (1782–1849), Scottish politician
- Sir George Warrender, 7th Baronet K.C.B. K.C.V.O. (1860–1917), vice-admiral in the British Royal Navy during World War I
- Sir Patrick Warrender, 3rd Baronet (1731–1799), Scottish soldier and politician
- Victor Warrender, 1st Baron Bruntisfield MC PC (1899–1993), Conservative politician

== See also ==
- Warrender Baths, swimming pool and fitness complex in Marchmont, Edinburgh
