= Harshae Raniga =

New Zealand footballer

Personal information
- Full name: Harshae Raniga
- Date of birth: 1 October 1994 (age 32)
- Place of birth: Auckland, New Zealand
- Height: 1.72 m (5 ft 8 in)
- Position: Defender

Team information
- Current team: Auckland United
- Number: 17

Senior career*
Years	Team	Apps	(Gls)
2012–2015	Waitakere United	28	(0)
2015–2019	Onehunga Sports		
2016–2018	Auckland City	1	(0)
2020–2024	Auckland United	55	(1)
2026–	Auckland United	4	(1)

International career
- New Zealand U17
2015	New Zealand U23	1	(0)
2015	New Zealand	1	(0)
- * Club domestic league appearances and goals as of 14 May 2026

Harshae Raniga (born 1 October 1994) is a New Zealand international footballer who plays as a defender.

== Career ==
=== International ===
Raniga was a member of the New Zealand under-17 side which won the 2011 OFC U-17 Championship. He was subsequently named in the squad for the 2011 FIFA U-17 World Cup.

He was called up to the under-23 side for the 2015 Pacific Games. New Zealand were eliminated in the semifinals after their win over Vanuatu was overturned by the OFC for fielding an ineligible player, causing the side to miss qualification for the 2016 Olympics.

Raniga was first called up to the New Zealand side for a friendly on 7 September 2015 against Myanmar in 2015. He made his debut briefly as a substitute, before coming from the field soon after due to injury in a 1–1 draw.

== Honours ==
=== International ===
New Zealand

- OFC U-17 Championship: 2011

== See also ==
- List of New Zealand international footballers
