= Owen Nuttridge =

New Zealand footballer

Personal information
- Full name: Owen F. Nuttridge
- Place of birth: New Zealand
- Position: Goalkeeper

Senior career*
Years	Team	Apps	(Gls)
1964–1967	Christchurch City		
1967–1970	Boston United	35	(0)
1970	Azzurri	18	(0)
1971–1975	New Brighton AFC		
1976	Rangers AFC	17	(0)
1978–1979	Nelson United	23	(0)

International career
1965	New Zealand U-23		
1967–1975	New Zealand	2	(0)
- * Club domestic league appearances and goals

Owen F. Nuttridge is a New Zealand former footballer who represented New Zealand at international level, as a goalkeeper.

Having already represented New Zealand at U-23 level, Nuttridge played two official A-international matches for the New Zealand, making his debut as a substitute in an 8–2 win over Malaysia on 16 November 1967, replacing Neville Siebert in goal for the second half. His second official appearance didn't come until nearly eight years later in a 2–0 win over China on 26 July 1975.
