= Steven Bruce =

New Zealand footballer

Personal information
- Full name: Steven A Bruce
- Place of birth: New Zealand

Senior career*
Years	Team	Apps	(Gls)
- Miramar Rangers

International career
1969	New Zealand	3	(0)
- * Club domestic league appearances and goals

Steven Bruce is a former association football player who represented New Zealand at international level.

Bruce played three official full internationals for New Zealand, making his debut in a 2–3 loss to New Caledonia on 29 July 1969. His other two matches were both losses against Israel, a 0–4 loss on 28 September and a 0–2 loss on 1 October 1969.
