= Gary Jenkins (footballer) =

New Zealand footballer

Personal information
- Full name: Gary S Jenkins
- Place of birth: New Zealand

Senior career*
Years	Team	Apps	(Gls)
- Eastern Suburbs

International career
1979	New Zealand	1	(0)
- * Club domestic league appearances and goals

Gary Jenkins is a former association football player who represented New Zealand at international level.

Jenkins made a solitary official international appearance for New Zealand as a substitute in a 2–1 win over Bahrain on 8 October 1979.
