= Paul Rennell =

New Zealand footballer

Personal information
- Full name: Paul L Rennell
- Place of birth: New Zealand

Senior career*
Years	Team	Apps	(Gls)
1961-1964	Kahukura (Rotorua)		
1964-	Eastern Suburbs		

International career
1967	New Zealand	4	(0)
- * Club domestic league appearances and goals

Paul Rennell is a former football (soccer) player who represented New Zealand at international level.

Rennell played four official A-international matches for New Zealand in 1967, the first three of which were at the Vietnam National Day Soccer Tournament. His debut was a 3–5 loss to trans-Tasman neighbours Australia on 5 November 1967, followed by a 3–1 win over Singapore on 8 November and a 1–5 loss to South Vietnam on 10 November 1967. His final official appearance was an 8–2 win over Malaysia on 16 November 1967.
