= Leo Hope-Ede =

New Zealand footballer

Personal information
- Full name: Leo D M Hope-Ede
- Place of birth: New Zealand
- Position: Outside right

Senior career*
Years	Team	Apps	(Gls)
- North Shore United

International career
1951–1952	New Zealand	8	(1)
- * Club domestic league appearances and goals

Leo Hope-Ede is a former association football player who represented New Zealand at international level.

Hope-Ede made his full All Whites debut in a 0–2 loss to New Caledonia on 19 September 1952 and ended his international playing career with eight A-international caps to his credit, scoring one goal. His final cap was an appearance in a 5–3 win over Tahiti on 28 September 1952.
