= Craig Simpson (footballer) =

New Zealand footballer

Personal information
- Full name: Craig D Simpson
- Place of birth: New Zealand
- Position: Midfielder

Senior career*
Years	Team	Apps	(Gls)
- Nelson United

International career
1986	New Zealand	2	(0)
- * Club domestic league appearances and goals

Craig Simpson is a former football (soccer) player who represented New Zealand at international level.

Simpson played two official A-international matches for the New Zealand in 1986, both against Pacific minnows Fiji, the first a 4–1 win on 17 September, the second two days later a 2–1 win on 19 September 1986.
