= Max Davis =

New Zealand footballer

Personal information
- Full name: Max J Davis
- Date of birth: 25 July 1950 (age 76)
- Place of birth: Wellington, New Zealand
- Position: Left wing

Youth career
- Stop Out
- Petone
- Gisborne Boys' High School

Senior career*
Years	Team	Apps	(Gls)
1968–1970	Gisborne City		
1971–1973	Mount Wellington		
1974	Eastern Suburbs		
1975	Mount Wellington		
1978	Mount Wellington		
1979	Blockhouse Bay		
1979	Gisborne City		

International career
1973	New Zealand	1	(0)
- * Club domestic league appearances and goals

Max Davis is a former association football player who represented New Zealand at international level.

Davis made a solitary official international appearance for New Zealand as a substitute in a 3–3 draw with Australia on 16 March 1973. Davis was a member of the Gisborne City team that in 1969 won entry into the inaugural New Zealand National League in 1970. He was with Mount Wellington when they won the National League in 1972, the Chatham Cup in 1973 and the Air New Zealand Cup in 1975. He also played in the 1972 Chatham Cup final that went to two replays before Christchurch United beat Mount Wellington 2–1 in Auckland, after the first game had ended 4–4 in Wellington and the second, 1–1 in Christchurch. In 1979, he returned to Gisborne City, who had been relegated to the Central League in 1976, and helped them win the league that year and, with it, promotion back to the National League. Davis had been to Britain at the end of the 1969 season and trained with West Ham for several months. Manager Ron Greenwood offered Davis a contract until the end of the 1969–70 season but he returned to Gisborne to play in the first season of the National League and try to make the New Zealand team. He was selected for three New Zealand team tours but each time missed out through injury. Davis played for Auckland against overseas teams that included Stoke City (Davis scoring a goal against England goalkeeper Gordon Banks in a 3–1 win), Wolverhampton Wanderers, Dundee, Hertha Berlin and Radnicki. He now lives in Australia with his wife Sharon.
