= Graeme Petersen =

New Zealand footballer

Personal information
- Full name: Graeme Edward Petersen
- Date of birth: 20 April 1941 (age 85)
- Place of birth: Wellington, New Zealand
- Position: Goalkeeper

Senior career*
Years	Team	Apps	(Gls)
- Stop Out

International career
1967	New Zealand	1	(0)
- * Club domestic league appearances and goals

Graeme Petersen is a former football (soccer) goalkeeper who represented New Zealand at international level.

Petersen made a solitary official international appearance for New Zealand in a 0–4 loss to New Caledonia on 8 November 1967.
