= Greg Hough (footballer) =

New Zealand footballer (1958–2008)

Personal information
- Full name: Gregory Keith Hough
- Date of birth: 1958
- Place of birth: New Zealand
- Date of death: 10 April 2008 (aged 49)

Senior career*
Years	Team	Apps	(Gls)
- Manurewa

International career
1977	New Zealand	1	(1)
- * Club domestic league appearances and goals

Gregory Keith Hough (1958 – 10 April 2008) was an association football player who represented New Zealand at international level.

Hough made a solitary official international appearance for New Zealand in a 3–0 win over New Caledonia on 5 March 1977, scoring one of New Zealand's goals, Clive Campbell scoring the other two.
