= Kelly McLoughlin =

New Zealand footballer

Personal information
- Full name: Kelly McLoughlin
- Place of birth: New Zealand

International career
Years	Team	Apps	(Gls)
1995	New Zealand	1	(0)

Kelly McLoughlin is a former association footballer who represented New Zealand at international level.

McLoughlin made a solitary official international appearance for New Zealand in a 3–0 win over Singapore on 21 February 1995.
