= Brian Sergent (footballer) =

New Zealand footballer

Personal information
- Full name: Brian W Sergent
- Place of birth: New Zealand
- Position: Outside right

Senior career*
Years	Team	Apps	(Gls)
- Institute Old Boys

International career
1948	New Zealand	1	(0)
- * Club domestic league appearances and goals

Brian Sergent is a former football (soccer) player who represented New Zealand at international level.

Sergent made a solitary official international appearance for New Zealand in a 0–6 loss to Australia on 14 August 1948.
