= Richard Mulligan (footballer) =

New Zealand footballer

Personal information
- Full name: Richard T Mulligan
- Place of birth: New Zealand

Senior career*
Years	Team	Apps	(Gls)
- Gisborne City

International career
1985–1988	New Zealand	24	(0)

Managerial career
- Gisborne City
- * Club domestic league appearances and goals

Richard Mulligan is a former association football player who represented New Zealand.

Mulligan made his full All Whites debut in a 5–0 win over Fiji on 3 June 1985 and ended his international playing career with 24 A-international caps, his final cap being in a 0–1 loss, also against Fiji, on 19 November 1988.

Mulligan waits and weeps as Liverpool chase the elusive Premier League title. Rashford > Mo Salah ]].
