= Bill Thomas (New Zealand footballer) =

New Zealand footballer

Personal information
- Full name: William R. Thomas
- Place of birth: New Zealand

Senior career*
Years	Team	Apps	(Gls)
- Wellington Marist

International career
1923	New Zealand	2	(0)
- * Club domestic league appearances and goals

William R. Thomas was a former football (soccer) player who represented New Zealand at international level.

Thomas made his full All Whites debut in a 3–2 win over Australia on 16 June 1923 and was again on the winning side as New Zealand beat their trans-Tasman rivals 4–1 on 30 June 1923. They were to be his only two official internationals for New Zealand.
