= Pat Harris (footballer) =

New Zealand footballer

Personal information
- Full name: A. J. Harris
- Place of birth: New Zealand
- Position: Right-back

Senior career*
Years	Team	Apps	(Gls)
- Waterside

International career
1947–1948	New Zealand	5	(0)
- * Club domestic league appearances and goals

A. J. Pat Harris is a former association football player who represented New Zealand at international level.

Harris played five official full internationals for New Zealand, making his debut in a 7–0 win over South Africa on 28 June 1947, his final cap earned in a 1–8 loss to Australia on 11 August 1948.
