= Ken Olley =

New Zealand footballer

Personal information
- Full name: Kenneth Olley
- Place of birth: New Zealand

Senior career*
Years	Team	Apps	(Gls)
- Western

International career
1954	New Zealand	3	(0)
- * Club domestic league appearances and goals

Kenneth Olley is a former football (soccer) player who represented New Zealand at international level.

Olley played three official A-international matches for New Zealand in 1954, all against trans-Tasman neighbours Australia, the first a 2–1 win on 14 August, followed by consecutive 1-4 losses on 28 August and 4 September respectively.
