= Des Warman =

New Zealand footballer

Personal information
- Full name: Desmond T Warman
- Place of birth: United Kingdom

Senior career*
Years	Team	Apps	(Gls)
- Ohakea

International career
1948	New Zealand	2	(0)
- * Club domestic league appearances and goals

Desmond Warman is a former football (soccer) player who represented New Zealand at international level.

Warman played two official A-international matches for the New Zealand national football team in 1948, both against visiting trans-Tasman neighbours Australia, the first a 0–4 loss on 4 September, followed by a 1–8 loss on 9 September.
