= Shaun Baxter =

New Zealand footballer

Personal information
- Full name: Shaun P M Baxter
- Place of birth: New Zealand

Senior career*
Years	Team	Apps	(Gls)
- Manurewa

International career
1980	New Zealand	7	(1)
- * Club domestic league appearances and goals

Shaun Baxter is a former association football player who represented New Zealand at international level. Baxter scored his only international goal on his full All Whites debut in a 5–1 win over Kuwait on 16 October 1980 and ended his international playing career with seven A-international caps to his credit, his final cap an appearance in a 0–2 loss to Malaysia on 30 October that same year.
