= Warren Fleet =

New Zealand footballer

Personal information
- Full name: Warren L Fleet
- Place of birth: New Zealand
- Position: Midfielder

International career
Years	Team	Apps	(Gls)
1972–1977	New Zealand	14	(0)

Warren Fleet is an association football player who represented New Zealand.

Fleet made his full All Whites debut in a 1–1 draw with Indonesia on 11 October 1972 and ended his international playing career with 14 A-international caps to his credit, his final cap a substitute appearance in a 6–0 win over Taiwan on 19 March 1977.
