= George Drylie =

New Zealand footballer

Personal information
- Full name: George Drylie
- Place of birth: New Zealand

Senior career*
Years	Team	Apps	(Gls)
- Stop Out

International career
1947	New Zealand	1	(0)
- * Club domestic league appearances and goals

George Drylie is a former association football player who represented New Zealand at an international level.

Drylie made a single appearance in an official international match for New Zealand, which resulted in a 0–6 loss to South Africa on 5 July 1947.
