= Theo van den Broek =

New Zealand footballer

Personal information
- Full name: Theo van den Broek
- Place of birth: New Zealand

International career
Years	Team	Apps	(Gls)
1958	New Zealand	5	(0)

Theo van den Broek is a former football (soccer) player who represented New Zealand at international level.

Van den Broek made his full All Whites debut in a 2–3 loss to Australia on 18 August 1958 and ended his international playing career with five A-international caps to his credit, his final cap an appearance in a 2–1 win over New Caledonia on 14 September 1958.
