= Tony Scheirlinck =

New Zealand footballer

Personal information
- Full name: Antonius J Scheirlinck
- Place of birth: New Zealand

Senior career*
Years	Team	Apps	(Gls)
- Mount Wellington

International career
1981	New Zealand	3	(0)
- * Club domestic league appearances and goals

Tony Scheirlinck is a former football player who represented New Zealand at international level.

Scheirlinck played three official full internationals for New Zealand, making his debut in a 0–0 draw with Indonesia on 7 September 1981. His other two matches were a 0–1 loss to United Arab Emirates on 9 September and a 1–0 win over Japan on 12 October 1981.
