= Neil Haines =

New Zealand footballer

Personal information
- Full name: Neil W Haines
- Place of birth: New Zealand

Senior career*
Years	Team	Apps	(Gls)
- North Shore United

International career
1978	New Zealand	1	(0)
- * Club domestic league appearances and goals

Neil Haines is a former association football player who represented New Zealand at international level.

Haines made a solitary official international appearance for New Zealand as a substitute in a 2–0 win over Singapore on 1 October 1978.
