= Paul Probert =

New Zealand footballer

Personal information
- Full name: Paul M. Probert
- Place of birth: New Zealand
- Position: Defender

Senior career*
Years	Team	Apps	(Gls)
- Gisborne City
- Nelson United

International career
1988	New Zealand	4	(0)
- * Club domestic league appearances and goals

Paul Probert is a football (soccer) player who represented New Zealand at international level.

Probert played four official full internationals for New Zealand, making his debut in a 2–0 win over Saudi Arabia on 21 June 1988. He gained his final three caps all against Pacific neighbours Fiji in November 1988.

Probert had a career in the New Zealand National League from the age of 18, firstly with Nelson United, before being signed by Kevin Fallon at Gisborne City. He had opportunities for professional contracts in both Australia and England, but elected to remain in New Zealand. He played in four Chatham Cup finals, winning just one. In 2002, he led Tauranga City United to the final, only to be defeated 2-0 by Napier City Rovers.
