= Mike Simeonoff =

New Zealand footballer

Personal information
- Full name: Michael Simeonoff
- Place of birth: New Zealand
- Position: Midfielder

Senior career*
Years	Team	Apps	(Gls)
- Wellington Diamond United

International career
1976–1981	New Zealand	4	(0)
- * Club domestic league appearances and goals

Mike Simeonoff is a former football (soccer) player who represented New Zealand at international level.

Simeonoff played four official full internationals for New Zealand, making his debut in a 0–2 loss to South Korea on 23 September 1976. He gained his final cap in a 0–1 loss to United Arab Emirates on 10 September 1981.
