= Tony Evans (New Zealand footballer) =

New Zealand footballer

Personal information
- Full name: J Anthony Evans
- Place of birth: New Zealand

Senior career*
Years	Team	Apps	(Gls)
- Northern Wellington
- Petone

International career
1962	New Zealand	2	(0)
- * Club domestic league appearances and goals

Tony Evans is a former association football player who represented New Zealand at international level.

Evans played two official A-international matches for the All Whites in 1962 against visitors New Caledonia, the first a 4–1 on 2 June 1962, his second a 4–2 win on 4 June. They were to be his only official matches as New Zealand played no other official matches until 1967.
