= Bob King (New Zealand footballer) =

New Zealand footballer

Personal information
- Full name: Robert H King
- Place of birth: New Zealand
- Position: Goalkeeper

Senior career*
Years	Team	Apps	(Gls)
- Eden

International career
1948	New Zealand	3	(0)
- * Club domestic league appearances and goals

Robert H King is a former association football goalkeeper who represented New Zealand at international level.

King played three official A-international matches for New Zealand in 1948, all against visiting trans-Tasman neighbours Australia, the first a 0–6 loss on 14 August, followed by 0-7 and 1-8 losses on 28 August and 9 September respectively.
