= Julie Inglis =

New Zealand footballer

Personal information
- Full name: Julie Inglis
- Date of birth: 5 August 1963 (age 63)
- Place of birth: New Zealand

International career
Years	Team	Apps	(Gls)
1984–1987	New Zealand	15	(0)

Julie Inglis (born 5 August 1963) is an association football player who represented New Zealand at international level.

Inglis made her Football Ferns debut as a substitute in a 3–0 win over Switzerland on 8 December 1984, and finished her international career with 15 caps to her credit.
