= Arthur Inglis =

New Zealand footballer

Personal information
- Full name: Arthur Inglis
- Place of birth: England
- Position: Forward

Senior career*
| Years | Team | Apps | (Gls) |
- Wellington Northern

International career
| 1962 | New Zealand | 2 | (0) |
- * Club domestic league appearances and goals

Arthur Inglis is a former association football player who represented New Zealand at international level.

Inglis played two official A-international matches for the All Whites in 1962 against visitors New Caledonia, the first a 4–1 on 2 June 1962, his second a 4–2 win on 4 June. They were to be his only official matches as New Zealand played no other official matches until 1967.

He is the father of Julie Inglis, who also represented New Zealand.
