= Alex Sutherland =

New Zealand footballer

Personal information
- Full name: Alex Sutherland
- Place of birth: New Zealand

Senior career*
Years	Team	Apps	(Gls)
- Maori Hill

International career
1936	New Zealand	1	(0)
- * Club domestic league appearances and goals

Alex Sutherland is a former football (soccer) player who represented New Zealand at international level.

Sutherland made a single appearance in an official international for the All Whites in a 1–10 loss to Australia on 11 July 1936. Although New Zealand have been beaten by more in unofficial matches, notably England Amateurs in 1937 and Manchester United in 1967, it remains New Zealand's heaviest defeat in official internationals.
