= Francis Phelan =

New Zealand footballer

Personal information
- Full name: Francis J Phelan
- Place of birth: New Zealand
- Position: Midfielder

Senior career*
Years	Team	Apps	(Gls)
- Petone

International career
1980	New Zealand	5	(0)
- * Club domestic league appearances and goals

Francis Phelan is a former football (soccer) player who represented New Zealand at international level.

Phelan made his full All Whites debut as a substitute in a 5–1 win over Kuwait on 16 October 1980 and made a total of five A-international appearances, all as a substitute, his final cap an appearance in a 0–2 loss to Malaysia on 30 October 1980.
