= Jim Christie =

Scottish-born New Zealand footballer

Personal information
- Full name: Jim Christie
- Place of birth: Scotland

Senior career*
Years	Team	Apps	(Gls)
- Tramways

International career
1933	New Zealand	3	(0)
- * Club domestic league appearances and goals

Jim Christie is a former association football player who represented New Zealand at international level.

Christie played three official A-international matches for the All Whites in 1933, all on tour against trans-Tasman neighbours Australia, the first a 2–4 loss on 5 June 1933, followed by a 4–6 loss and another 2–4 loss on 17 and 24 June respectively.
