= Jim McDougall =

New Zealand footballer

Personal information
- Full name: James D C McDougall
- Place of birth: Scotland
- Place of death: Christchurch New Zealand
- Position: Goalkeeper

Senior career*
Years	Team	Apps	(Gls)
- Mosgiel

International career
1927	New Zealand	4	(0)
- * Club domestic league appearances and goals

Jim McDougall is a former association footballer who represented New Zealand as a goalkeeper at international level.

McDougall made four appearances for the All Whites, all against the touring Canadians. His first match ended in a 2–2 draw on 25 June 1927, followed by a 1–2 loss, a 1–0 win and his final match a 1–4 loss on 23 July 1927
