= John van Helden =

New Zealand footballer

Personal information
- Full name: John C van Helden
- Place of birth: New Zealand

Senior career*
Years	Team	Apps	(Gls)
- Gisborne City

International career
1980	New Zealand	1	(0)
- * Club domestic league appearances and goals

John van Helden is a former football (soccer) player who represented New Zealand at international level.

Van Helden made a solitary official international appearance for New Zealand as a substitute in a 0–0 draw with Indonesia on 21 October 1980.
