= Ian Upchurch =

New Zealand footballer

Personal information
- Full name: Ian E. Upchurch
- Place of birth: New Zealand
- Positions: Defender; goalkeeper

Senior career*
Years	Team	Apps	(Gls)
- Seatoun

International career
1952	New Zealand	4	(0)
- * Club domestic league appearances and goals

Ian E. Upchurch is a former football (soccer) player who represented New Zealand at international level.

Upchurch played nine time for New Zealand including four official full internationals. His first two official matches were against Pacific neighbours Fiji, a 2–0 win on 7 September and a 9–0 win on 14 September 1952. These were followed by games against Tahiti, first a 2–2 draw on 21 September. His final appearance was a 5–3 win, Upchurch replacing the injured Jim Stephenson in goal for that game.
