= Tom Methven =

New Zealand footballer

Personal information
- Full name: Thomas Methven
- Place of birth: Thornton, Fife, Scotland
- Place of death: Auckland, New Zealand

Senior career*
Years	Team	Apps	(Gls)
- Ohakea

International career
1948	New Zealand	3	(0)
- * Club domestic league appearances and goals

Thomas Methven is a former association football player who represented New Zealand at international level.

Methven played three official A-international matches for New Zealand in 1948, all against visiting trans-Tasman neighbours Australia, the first a 0–7 loss on 28 August, followed by 0-4 and 1-8 losses on 4 September and 9 September respectively.
