= Kevin Mulgrew =

New Zealand footballer

Personal information
- Full name: Kevin Patrick Mulgrew
- Place of birth: Stockton-on-Tees, England

Senior career*
Years	Team	Apps	(Gls)
- Woolston WMC
- Christchurch United

International career
1975–1977	New Zealand	12	(1)
- * Club domestic league appearances and goals

Kevin Mulgrew is a former association football player who represented New Zealand at international level.

Mulgrew made his full All Whites debut in a 2–1 win over China on 20 July 1975 and ended his international playing career with 12 A-international caps and 1 goal to his credit, his final cap a substitute appearance in a 1–2 loss to New Caledonia on 2 October 1976.
