= John Legg (footballer) =

New Zealand footballer

John E R Legg
Personal information
- Full name: John Legg
- Place of birth: Nairobi, Kenya

Senior career*
Years	Team	Apps	(Gls)
- Eastern Suburbs
- Blockhouse Bay
- Courier Rangers
- Waitemata
- Johannesburg Rangers

International career
1967–1975	New Zealand	12	(2)
- * Club domestic league appearances and goals

John Legg is a former association football player who represented New Zealand at international level.

Legg made his full All Whites debut in a 3–5 loss to Australia on 5 November 1967 and ended his international playing career with 12 A-international caps and 2 goals to his credit, his final cap an appearance in a 1–1 draw with Macao on 5 November 1975.
