= Matt Guildea =

New Zealand footballer

Personal information
- Full name: Matt Guildea
- Place of birth: Ireland
- Position: Forward

Senior career*
| Years | Team | Apps | (Gls) |
- North Shore United
| 1976-77 | Eastern AA | 14 | (7) |

International career
| 1969 | New Zealand | 6 | (0) |
- * Club domestic league appearances and goals

Matt Guildea is a former association football player who represented New Zealand at international level.

Guildea made his full All Whites debut in a 0-0 draw with New Caledonia on 25 July 1969 and ended his international playing career with six A-international caps to his credit, his final cap an appearance in a 0-2 loss to Israel on 1 October 1969.
