= Tommy Mason (New Zealand footballer) =

New Zealand footballer

Personal information
- Full name: Thomas J R Mason
- Date of birth: 19 June 1960 (age 66)
- Place of birth: England
- Position: Defender

Senior career*
Years	Team	Apps	(Gls)
- Papatoetoe
- Farnborough Town

International career
1989	New Zealand	4	(0)

Managerial career
- 2003–2004: Football Kingz
- * Club domestic league appearances and goals

Tommy Mason is a former association football player who represented New Zealand at international level.

Mason made his full New Zealand debut in a 0–1 loss to Israel on 3 March 1989 and ended his international playing career with four official A-international caps to his credit, his final cap an appearance in a 2–0 win over Taiwan on 20 March 1988.

After ending his playing career, Mason turned to football management and managed Football Kingz in the Australian National Soccer League for a short period.
