= Tony Levy =

New Zealand footballer

Personal information
- Full name: Anthony Samuel Levy
- Date of birth: 20 October 1959 (age 67)
- Place of birth: Edmonton, England
- Position: Midfielder

Senior career*
Years	Team	Apps	(Gls)
1977–1979	Plymouth Argyle	1	(0)
1979–1980	Torquay United	13	(1)
1980	Yeovil Town		
1980–1981	St Albans City	38	(6)
1981–1982	Tooting & Mitcham United	36	(2)
1982	Carshalton Athletic	4	(0)
1982–1983	Hayes	10	(1)
1983–1986	Mount Wellington		
1986–1987	Hayes	1	(0)
1987–1988	North Shore United		
1988–1989	Mount Wellington		

International career
1988–1989	New Zealand	6	(0)
- * Club domestic league appearances and goals

Anthony Samuel Levy (born 20 October 1959) is a former footballer who played as a midfielder. He made 14 appearances in the Football League for Plymouth Argyle and Torquay United, and won six caps for New Zealand at full international level.

Levy made his full All Whites debut in a 4–0 win over Chinese Taipei on 11 December 1988 and ended his international playing career with six A-international caps to his credit, his final cap an appearance in a 2–2 draw with Israel on 9 April 1989.
