= Bert Hiddlestone =

New Zealand footballer

Personal information
- Full name: Robert G. Hiddlestone
- Place of birth: New Zealand
- Position: Goalkeeper

Senior career*
Years	Team	Apps	(Gls)
- Seatoun

International career
1954	New Zealand	3	(0)
- * Club domestic league appearances and goals

Robert G. Hiddlestone was an association football goalkeeper who represented New Zealand at international level.

Hiddlestone played a total 12 times for New Zealand including three official A-international matches in 1954, all against trans-Tasman neighbours Australia, the first a 2-1 win on 14 August, followed by consecutive 1-4 losses on 28 August and 4 September respectively.
