= Tinoi Christie =

New Zealand footballer

Personal information
- Full name: Tinoi Christie
- Date of birth: 29 February 1976 (age 50)
- Place of birth: Port Moresby, Papua New Guinea
- Height: 1.78 m (5 ft 10 in)
- Position: Midfielder

Senior career*
| Years | Team | Apps | (Gls) |
- Hillingdon Borough

International career
| 1997–1999 | New Zealand | 15 | (1) |
Medal record
Representing New Zealand
Men's Association football
OFC Nations Cup
| Winner | 1998 Australia |
- * Club domestic league appearances and goals

Tinoi Christie (born 29 February 1976) is an association football player who represented New Zealand. He played as a midfielder.

Christie made his full All Whites debut as a substitute in a 0–5 loss to Indonesia on 25 September 1997. He was originally named in the New Zealand side for the 1999 Confederations Cup but later omitted from the finals tournament squad. Christie ended his international playing career with 15 A-international caps and 1 goal to his credit, his final cap a substitute appearance in a 0–1 loss to Egypt on 15 July 1999.

He played club football for Hillingdon Borough in England.

== Honours ==
New Zealand

- OFC Nations Cup: 1998
