= Alex Caldwell =

New Zealand footballer

Personal information
- Full name: Alex Caldwell
- Place of birth: Stirling, Scotland

Senior career*
Years	Team	Apps	(Gls)
- Saint Kilda
- Otematata

International career
1967	New Zealand	1	(0)
- * Club domestic league appearances and goals

Alex Caldwell is a former association football player who represented New Zealand at international level.

Caldwell made a solitary official international appearance for New Zealand in a 3–1 win over Singapore on 8 November 1967 at the Vietnam National day tournament.
