= Frits Poelman =

New Zealand footballer

Personal information
- Full name: Frits Poelman
- Place of birth: Netherlands
- Position: Left-back

Senior career*
Years	Team	Apps	(Gls)
- Hamilton Technical Old Boys

International career
1958	New Zealand	2	(0)
- * Club domestic league appearances and goals

Frits Poelman is a former football (soccer) player who represented New Zealand at international level.

Poelman played two official A-international matches for the New Zealand in 1954, both 2-1 wins over New Caledonia, the first on 31 August, the second on 14 September 1958.

In club football for Hamilton Technical Old Boys, Poelman played alongside brother Klaas Poelman, who played two representative matches for New Zealand but gained no A-international caps.

Poelman played in an Auckland provincial team who recorded a notable win at Blandford Park over FK Austria Wien, many time club champions of Austria. In contrast to the 7–1 loss recorded by the New Zealand national side. The provincial side packed with immigrants not eligible for New Zealand national football team selection, recorded a convincing 3–0 win.

== Honours ==
- 1962 Chatham Cup
