= Alex Stenhouse =

New Zealand footballer

Personal information
- Full name: Alexander Stenhouse
- Date of birth: 11 May 1910
- Place of birth: Aberfoyle, Perthshire., Scotland
- Date of death: 9 May 1992 (aged 81)
- Place of death: Dunedin, New Zealand
- Position: Right-half

Senior career*
Years	Team	Apps	(Gls)
- Mosgiel

International career
1933	New Zealand	3	(0)
- * Club domestic league appearances and goals

Alexander Stenhouse (11 May 1910 – 9 May 1992) was a football (soccer) player who represented New Zealand at the international level.

Stenhouse played three official A-international matches for the All Whites in 1933, all on tour against trans-Tasman neighbours Australia, the first a 2–4 loss on 5 June 1933, followed by a 4–6 loss and another 2–4 loss on 17 and 24 June respectively.

Stenhouse arrived in New Zealand with his siblings at about age 12. He played as a junior at King Edward Technical College Old Boys in Dunedin until the Third Grade. In 1931 he transferred to Mosgiel AFC and first appeared in a friendly match against Mornington AFC on 4 April 1931. He made his full First Team debut against Seacliff AFC on 23 May 1931, but played the majority of the season for the Second Grade team.

Stenhouse was the only son of James Stenhouse and Isabella McLucas who were married 18 July 1905. Alex married 3 April 1939 to Dorothy, They had three sons, Jim (b. 1942), Donald (b. 1946)and David (b. 1949) He was nicknamed "Chooka" by his workmates on account of his surname sounding like "hen-house"

Stenhouse was a manager at a painting firm. He died in Dunedin just before his 82nd birthday, and was cremated.
