= George Cuthill =

Scottish-born New Zealand footballer

Personal information
- Full name: George McIntosh Cuthill
- Date of birth: 29 October 1934 (age 92)
- Place of birth: Glasgow, Scotland
- Position: Inside forward

Senior career*
Years	Team	Apps	(Gls)
- Mosgiel

International career
1958	New Zealand	2	(1)
- * Club domestic league appearances and goals

George Cuthill is a former association football player who represented New Zealand at international level.

Cuthill played two official A-international matches for New Zealand in 1958, the first a 2–3 loss against trans-Tasman neighbours Australia on 16 August 1958, the second a 5–1 win over New Caledonia on 7 September that same year, Cuthill amongst the goalscorers that day.
