= Keith Barton =

New Zealand footballer

- Barton in the late 1970s

Personal information
- Full name: Keith Barton
- Date of birth: 21 November 1951 (age 74)
- Place of birth: Liverpool, England
- Date of death: October 1995
- Place of death: Australia

Senior career*
| Years | Team | Apps | (Gls) |
- Western Suburbs FC
| 1972–1984 | Stop Out | 246 | (14) |

International career
| 1975 | New Zealand | 1 | (0) |
- * Club domestic league appearances and goals

Keith Barton (November 21, 1951 – October 1995) was a association football player who represented New Zealand at international level.

Barton made a solitary official international appearance for New Zealand in a 2–2 draw with China on 23 July 1975.

Barton holds the record for number of appearances for Stop Out. He also appeared in two Chatham Cup finals whilst with Western Suburbs FC. In 1970 and 1971.
