= Stan Cawtheray =

New Zealand footballer

Personal information
- Full name: Stanley Cawtheray
- Date of birth: 14 January 1906
- Place of birth: Holbeck, England
- Date of death: 28 November 1989 (aged 83)

Senior career*
Years	Team	Apps	(Gls)
- Western

International career
1936	New Zealand	2	(0)
- * Club domestic league appearances and goals

Stanley Cawtheray (11 February 1906 – 28 November 1989) was an association football player who represented New Zealand at international level.

Cawtheray made two appearances in official internationals for the All Whites, the first a 1–7 loss to Australia on 4 July 1936, while his second match, losing 0–10 to Australia on 11 July 1936, still stands as New Zealand's biggest loss in official matches, although New Zealand have been beaten by more in unofficial matches, notably England Amateurs in 1937 and Manchester United in 1967.
