= Geordie Newman =

English-born New Zealand footballer

Personal information
- Full name: Fredrick Ernest Newman
- Place of birth: Northumberland, England

Senior career*
Years	Team	Apps	(Gls)
- Millerton All Blacks

International career
1927	New Zealand	4	(0)
- * Club domestic league appearances and goals

Geordie Newman is a former association football player who represented New Zealand at international level.

Newman made four appearances for the All Whites, all against the touring Canadians. His first match ended in a 2–2 draw on 25 June 1927, followed by a 1–2 loss, a 1–0 win and his final match a 1–4 loss on 23 July 1927.

Newman played in the 1932 Chatham Cup Final for Millerton All Blacks.
