= Neville Siebert =

New Zealand footballer

Personal information
- Full name: Neville J Siebert
- Place of birth: New Zealand
- Position: Goalkeeper

Senior career*
Years	Team	Apps	(Gls)
- Mount Wellington

International career
1967–1968	New Zealand	6	(0)
- * Club domestic league appearances and goals

Neville Siebert is a former football (soccer) goalkeeper who represented New Zealand at international level.

Siebert made his full All Whites debut in a 3–5 loss to Australia on 5 November 1967 and ended his international playing career with six A–international caps to his credit, his final cap an appearance in a 1–3 loss to New Caledonia on 8 October 1968.
