= Bobby Almond =

English-born New Zealand footballer

Personal information
- Full name: Robert Ronald Almond
- Date of birth: 16 April 1952 (age 74)
- Place of birth: London, England
- Position: Centre back

Youth career
- Leyton Orient
- Tottenham Hotspur

Senior career*
Years	Team	Apps	(Gls)
- Walthamstow Avenue
- Christchurch United
- Invercargill Thistle

International career
1979–1982	New Zealand	28	(0)
- * Club domestic league appearances and goals

Robert Ronald Almond (born 16 April 1951 in England) is a footballer who represented New Zealand and was part of the first New Zealand side to contest a FIFA World Cup in 1982.

== Career ==
Almond was a part of the Leyton Orient and Tottenham Hotspur youth set-ups and a first team player for Walthamstow Avenue in the Isthmian League before he emigrated to New Zealand in 1973.

Almond made his New Zealand debut in a 1–0 win over Australia on 13 June 1979. He pulled on the All White strip a total of 49 times between 1978 and 1982, although only 28 were full A-internationals.

He was a member the All Whites squad at the 1982 FIFA World Cup in Spain, playing in all 15 qualifiers, and started two games at the finals, the 5–2 loss to Scotland and 4–0 loss to Brazil, having to sit out the game against USSR with an Achilles tendon injury. Almond retired from international football following their elimination.

Almond co-authored a book, To Spain the Hard Way, with Steve Sumner and Derrick Mansbridge, chronicling the experience.
