= Praven Jeram =

New Zealand footballer

Personal information
- Full name: Praven Jeram
- Date of birth: 14 February 1954 (age 72)
- Place of birth: Navasari, India
- Position: Goalkeeper

Senior career*
Years	Team	Apps	(Gls)
- Eastern Suburbs

International career
- New Zealand U20
1971–1977	New Zealand	9	(0)
- * Club domestic league appearances and goals

Praven Jeram is a former association football goalkeeper. Born in India, he represented New Zealand at international level.

== International career ==
Jeram represented New Zealand at under-20 level before making his full All Whites debut in a 1–2 loss to New Caledonia on 21 July 1971 and ended his international playing career with 9 A-international caps to his credit, his final cap also against New Caledonia, a 4–0 win on 8 March 1977.
