= Neil McArthur (footballer) =

New Zealand footballer

Personal information
- Full name: Neil McArthur
- Date of birth: 19 March 1898
- Place of birth: Glasgow, Scotland
- Date of death: 2 April 1974 (aged 76)
- Place of death: Warkworth, New Zealand

Senior career*
Years	Team	Apps	(Gls)
- Wellington Thistle

International career
1922–1923	New Zealand	2	(0)
- * Club domestic league appearances and goals

Neil McArthur (19 March 1898 – 2 April 1974) was a New Zealand association football player who represented New Zealand at international level.

McArthur made his full All Whites debut in a 3–1 win over Australia on 22 July 1922 and played just one further official international, also against Australia, losing 1–2 on 7 June 1923.

He went on to introduce and be the managing director of New Zealand's national lottery.
