= Iain Hastie =

New Zealand footballer

Ian Hastie
Personal information
- Full name: John Baxter Hastie
- Place of birth: Scotland
- Date of death: 2018
- Place of death: New Zealand

Senior career*
Years	Team	Apps	(Gls)
- Mount Wellington

International career
1971–1972	New Zealand	6	(1)
- * Club domestic league appearances and goals

Ian Hastie is an association football player who represented New Zealand at international level.

Hastie scored his only international goal on his full All Whites debut in a 2–4 loss to New Caledonia on 17 July 1971 and ended his international playing career with six A-international caps to his credit, his final cap an appearance in a 1–1 draw with Indonesia on 11 October 1972.
