= Perry Cotton =

New Zealand footballer

Personal information
- Full name: Perry Cotton
- Date of birth: 11 November 1965 (age 60)
- Place of birth: Chislehurst, England
- Position: Midfielder

Senior career*
Years	Team	Apps	(Gls)
- Manawatu AFC
- Bromley
- Nelson United
1988–1991	Scunthorpe United	33	(2)
1991–1992	Kettering Town	6	(0)
1992–1993	Runcorn	7	(1)
1993	Alfreton Town	4	(1)
1993–2003	Napier City Rovers		
2004–2006	Hawke's Bay United		

International career^{‡}
1992–1995	New Zealand	10	(1)
- * Club domestic league appearances and goals ‡ National team caps and goals as of 10:25, 12 May 2009 (UTC)

Perry Cotton (born 11 November 1965) is an association football player who represented New Zealand at international level.

He played for Scunthorpe United.

Cotton made his full All Whites debut in a 3–0 win over Fiji on 7 June 1992 and ended his international playing career with 10 A-international caps and 1 goal, his final cap an appearance in a 2–2 draw with Uruguay on 28 June 1995.
