= Gordon Barker (footballer) =

New Zealand footballer

Personal information
- Full name: Gordon William Barker
- Place of birth: Alderney, Channel Islands, UK.
- Position: Winger

Senior career*
Years	Team	Apps	(Gls)
- Mount Roskill

International career
1954	New Zealand	1	(0)
- * Club domestic league appearances and goals

Gordon Barker was an association football player who represented New Zealand at international level.

Barker made a solitary official international appearance for New Zealand in a 2–1 win over Australia on 14 August 1954.
