= Joe Todd (footballer) =

New Zealand footballer

Personal information
- Full name: George Todd
- Place of birth: Scotland

Senior career*
Years	Team	Apps	(Gls)
- Hospital

International career
1936	New Zealand	2	(0)
- * Club domestic league appearances and goals

Joe Todd is a former football (soccer) player who represented New Zealand at international level.

Todd made two appearances in official internationals for the New Zealand, the first being a 0–10 loss to Australia on 11 July 1936, which still stands as New Zealand's biggest loss in official matches, although New Zealand have been beaten by more in unofficial matches, notably England Amateurs in 1937 and Manchester United in 1967. His team fared better in his second match, losing 1–4 on 18 July 1936, their best result of Australia's three match tour of New Zealand that year.
