= Keith Garland =

New Zealand footballer

Personal information
- Full name: Keith Garland
- Place of birth: Liverpool, England

Senior career*
Years	Team	Apps	(Gls)
- Manurewa

International career
1984	New Zealand	7	(0)
- * Club domestic league appearances and goals

Keith Garland is a former association football player who represented New Zealand at international level.

Garland made his full All Whites debut in a 2–0 win over Malaysia on 30 March 1984 and ended his international playing career with seven A-international caps to his credit, his final cap an appearance in a 1–1 draw with Fiji on 20 October that same year.
