= Jim Bell (footballer) =

New Zealand footballer

Personal information
- Full name: James Bell
- Date of birth: 15 December 1935
- Place of birth: Portadown, Northern Ireland
- Date of death: 30 May 2019 (aged 83)
- Position: Winger

Senior career*
| Years | Team | Apps | (Gls) |
| 1958 –1959 | Northern Wellington | | |
| 1960 – 1961 | Onehunga | | |

International career
| 1959 - 1961 | New Zealand | 5 | (0) |
- * Club domestic league appearances and goals

James Bell (15 December 1935 – 30 May 2019) was a former Northern Irish association football player who represented New Zealand at international level.

Bell played two official A-international matches for the New Zealand in 1960, both against Pacific minnows Tahiti, the first a 5–1 win on 5 September in which he scored one of New Zealand's goals, the second a 2–1 win on 12 September 1960.

Bell had been on the books of Northern Ireland club, Linfield F.C., and was visiting his brother in Wellington when he was asked to join the capital's Northern club. Bell played 5 games in total for New Zealand, including a trip to Tahiti and a 2–3 win against Costa Rica at Carlaw Park, Auckland in 1959. Bell moved to Wairakei to work on stage two of the central North Island power project, however, he still found time for football, travelling to Rotorua to play for the Kahurangi club, a forerunner to Rotorua Suburbs. His last representative game was for the New Zealand Minor Associations against Sir Tom Finney's invitation England side at Napier's McLean Park in 1961. Bell returned to the U.K. for two years in the early 60s before settling in Auckland where he continued to play club football for 40 years. During this time he played for Onehunga, Newmarket Sparta, Mount Albert - Ponsonby, Mount Roskill and Three Kings United. Bell retired from competitive soccer in 2000 at the age of 65.
