= Tony Ferris =

New Zealand footballer

Personal information
- Full name: Anthony Ferris
- Date of birth: 4 October 1961 (age 65)
- Place of birth: Northern Ireland
- Position: Midfielder

Senior career*
Years	Team	Apps	(Gls)
- Mount Maunganui

International career
1988–1991	New Zealand	13	(0)
- * Club domestic league appearances and goals

Tony Ferris was an association football player who represented New Zealand at international level.

Ferris made his full All Whites debut in a 2–0 win over Saudi Arabia on 21 June 1988 and ended his international playing career with 13 A-international caps to his credit, his final cap an appearance in a 0–2 loss to England on 8 June 1991.
