= Doug Ottley =

New Zealand footballer

Personal information
- Full name: Douglas W C Ottley
- Date of birth: 17 May 1923
- Place of birth: London, England
- Date of death: 27 June 1983 (aged 60)
- Place of death: Invercargill, New Zealand

Senior career*
Years	Team	Apps	(Gls)
- Brigadiers

International career
1948–1951	New Zealand	6	(0)
- * Club domestic league appearances and goals

Douglas Ottley (1923-1983) was an association football player who represented New Zealand at international level.

Ottley made his full All Whites debut in a 0–7 loss to Australia on 28 August 1948 and ended his international playing career with six A-international caps to his credit, his final cap an appearance in a 9–0 win over New Hebrides on 9 April 1951.
