= George Lamont =

Scottish-born New Zealand footballer

Personal information
- Full name: George W Lamont
- Place of birth: Scotland

Senior career*
Years	Team	Apps	(Gls)
- Mount Wellington

International career
1967	New Zealand	1	(0)
- * Club domestic league appearances and goals

George Lamont is a former association football player who represented New Zealand at international level.

Lamont made a solitary official international appearance for New Zealand in a 0–4 loss to New Caledonia on 8 November 1967.
