= Ken Ironside =

Scottish-born New Zealand footballer

Personal information
- Full name: J Kenneth Ironside
- Place of birth: Glasgow, Scotland

Senior career*
Years	Team	Apps	(Gls)
- Hamilton

International career
1967	New Zealand	1	(0)
- * Club domestic league appearances and goals

Ken Ironside is a former association football player who represented New Zealand at international level.

Ironside made a solitary official international appearance for New Zealand in a 0–4 loss to New Caledonia on 8 November 1967.
