= Joe Kissock =

New Zealand footballer (1893–1959)

Personal information
- Full name: Joseph Gartshore Kissock
- Date of birth: 5 June 1893
- Place of birth: Coatbridge, Scotland
- Date of death: 1 September 1959 (aged 66)
- Place of death: San Francisco, United States
- Height: 5 ft 11 in (1.80 m)
- Position: Defender

Senior career*
Years	Team	Apps	(Gls)
?–1919	Vale of Clyde		
1919–1921	Bury	6	(0)
1921–1922	Bristol Rovers	18	(0)
1922	Peebles Rovers		
1923	Hospital		

International career
1923	New Zealand	3	(0)
- * Club domestic league appearances and goals

Joseph Gartshore Kissock (5 June 1893 – 1 September 1959) was a Scottish-born association football player who represented New Zealand at international level.

He played for Vale of Clyde in his native Scotland, before moving to England in 1919 to join Bury. He spent a year with Bristol Rovers during the 1921–22 season, and after a brief spell back in Scotland with Peebles Rovers, he moved to the United States in 1922. He stayed in America for a year, and moved to New Zealand in 1923. Here, he played for Porirua team Hospital.

Kissock made his full All Whites debut in a 1–2 loss to Australia on 9 June 1923 and played two further official internationals that month, beating Australia 3-2 and 4–1. These were to be his only official internationals for New Zealand.

He died in San Francisco in September 1959.
