= Ken France =

New Zealand footballer (1941–2019)

Personal information
- Full name: Kenneth France
- Date of birth: 22 February 1941
- Place of birth: England
- Date of death: 30 August 2019 (aged 78)
- Place of death: Christchurch, New Zealand

Senior career*
Years	Team	Apps	(Gls)
1959–1961	Bolton Wanderers	0	(0)
1961–1966	Technical College Old Boys		
1967	New Brighton		
1968–1969	Christchurch Technical		
1970–1974	Christchurch United		

International career
1967–1973	New Zealand	5	(0)
- * Club domestic league appearances and goals

Kenneth France (22 February 1941 – 30 August 2019) was an association football player who represented New Zealand at international level.

France made his full All Whites debut as a substitute in a 3–1 win over Singapore on 8 November 1967 and ended his international playing career with five A-international caps to his credit, his final cap an appearance in a 0–0 draw with Iran on 12 August 1973.
