= Graham Pearce (New Zealand footballer) =

New Zealand footballer

Personal information
- Full name: Graham Pearce
- Date of birth: 4 September 1977 (age 49)
- Position: Defender

Senior career*
Years	Team	Apps	(Gls)
2000	Mt Wellington		
2001	Napier City Rovers		
2004	Eastern Suburbs		
2006–2008	Waitakere United	20	(0)
2008–2009	Waikato	13	(2)
2006–2008	Waitakere United		

International career
2000	New Zealand	3	(0)

Managerial career
- 2011: Eastern Suburbs
- * Club domestic league appearances and goals

Graham Pearce is a football (soccer) player who represented New Zealand at international level.

Pearce played three official full internationals for New Zealand, making his debut in a 0–0 draw with Malaysia on 13 August 2000.
