= Tom McCabe (footballer) =

New Zealand footballer (1932–2009)

Personal information
- Full name: Thomas G. McCabe
- Date of birth: 13 October 1932
- Place of birth: Dundalk, Ireland
- Date of death: May 2009 (aged 76)
- Place of death: Australia
- Position: Forward

Senior career*
Years	Team	Apps	(Gls)
1949–1953	Dundalk	?	(13)
1953–1954	Distillery	?	(2)
1954–1956	Glentoran	20	(8)
1956–1957	Portadown	?	(6)
1957–1965	Wellington Marist		

International career
1958	New Zealand	5	(0)
- * Club domestic league appearances and goals

Thomas G. McCabe (13 October 1932 – May 2009) was an Irish-born association football player who represented New Zealand at international level.

McCabe made his full All Whites debut in a 2–3 loss to Australia on 18 August 1958 and ended his international playing career with five A-international caps to his credit, his final cap an appearance in a 2–1 win over New Caledonia on 14 September 1958.

McCabe died in Australia in May 2009, at the age of 76.
