= Eric Lesbirel =

English-born New Zealand footballer

Personal information
- Full name: Eric Lesbirel
- Place of birth: England

Senior career*
Years	Team	Apps	(Gls)
- Vale Recreation
- Wellington Diamond United
- Wellington United
1981	Preston Makedonia	1	(0)

International career
1977	New Zealand	2	(0)
- * Club domestic league appearances and goals

Eric Lesbirel (born 1951) is a former association football player who represented New Zealand at the international level.

Lesbirel played two official A-international matches for New Zealand in 1977, both against New Caledonia, the first a 3–0 win on 5 March, the second three days later a 4–0 win on 8 March 1977.
