= Grahame Davis =

New Zealand footballer

Personal information
- Full name: Grahame K Davis
- Place of birth: Scotland

Senior career*
Years	Team	Apps	(Gls)
- Christchurch Technical

International career
1968	New Zealand	1	(0)
- * Club domestic league appearances and goals

Grahame Davis is a former association football player who represented New Zealand at international level.

Davis made a solitary official international appearance for New Zealand in a 1–3 loss to New Caledonia on 8 October 1968.
