= Tommy Randles =

English footballer

Personal information
- Full name: Thomas Randles
- Date of birth: 13 October 1940 (age 86)
- Place of birth: Blackpool, England
- Position: Forward

Senior career*
Years	Team	Apps	(Gls)
- Ellesmere Port
1961–1962	Stoke City	2	(0)
1963–196?	APIA Leichhardt		
196?–1969	Sydney Croatia		
1970–1975	Christchurch United		
1975	Rangers AFC		
1976–1977	Christchurch Technical		

International career
1973	New Zealand	4	(0)
- * Club domestic league appearances and goals

Thomas Randles (born 13 October 1940) is an English former footballer who played in the Football League for Stoke City.

== Career ==
Randles played for Ellesmere Port before joining Stoke City in 1961. He made two appearances for Stoke both coming in games against Liverpool at the end of the 1961–62 season. Randles emigrated to New Zealand in 1963 and went to play for various Kiwi and Australian teams and also played four times for the New Zealand national team.

== Career statistics ==
Appearances and goals by club, season and competition
Club	Season	League			FA Cup		League Cup		Total	
Club	Season	Division	Apps	Goals	Apps	Goals	Apps	Goals	Apps	Goals
Stoke City	1961–62	Second Division	2	0	0	0	0	0	2	0
Career total			2	0	0	0	0	0	2	0
