= Paddy McFarlane =

New Zealand footballer

Personal information
- Full name: Patrick Andrew McFarlane
- Date of birth: 29 May 1932
- Place of birth: Edinburgh, Scotland
- Date of death: 25 October 2013 (aged 81)
- Place of death: Dunedin, New Zealand
- Position: Wing-half

Senior career*
Years	Team	Apps	(Gls)
- King Edward Technical College OB

International career
1958–1960	New Zealand	7	(0)
- * Club domestic league appearances and goals

Patrick McFarlane (29 May 1932 – 25 October 2013) was an association footballer who represented New Zealand at international level.

McFarlane made his full All Whites debut in a 2–3 loss to Australia on 16 August 1958 and ended his international playing career with 7 A-international caps and 7 non cap earning appearances to his credit, his final cap an appearance in a 2-1 win over Tahiti on 12 September 1960.

== Personal information ==
Born in Scotland, McFarlane migrated to New Zealand as a young man and worked as a tiling contractor in Dunedin. He was married to Mary with whom he had three children.
