= Bob Quickenden =

New Zealand footballer

Personal information
- Full name: Robert Quickenden
- Date of birth: 14 December 1923
- Place of birth: London, England
- Date of death: 28 July 2010 (aged 86)
- Place of death: New Zealand
- Position: Forward

Senior career*
Years	Team	Apps	(Gls)
- Petone

International career
1952	New Zealand	5	(2)
- * Club domestic league appearances and goals

Robert Quickenden (14 December 1923 – 28 July 2010) was a football (soccer) player who represented New Zealand at international level.

Quickenden made his full All Whites debut in a 2–0 win over Fiji on 7 September 1952 and ended his international playing career with five A-international caps and two goals to his credit, his final cap an appearance in a 5–3 win over Tahiti on 28 September 1952.

Born in London on 14 December 1923, Quickenden became a naturalised New Zealand citizen in 1975, and died on 28 July 2010.
