= David Houghton (footballer) =

New Zealand footballer

Personal information
- Full name: David Houghton
- Place of birth: England
- Position: Goalkeeper

Senior career*
| Years | Team | Apps | (Gls) |
- Stop Out

International career
| 1969 | New Zealand | 1 | (0) |
- * Club domestic league appearances and goals

David Houghton is a former association football goalkeeper who represented New Zealand at international level.

Houghton made a solitary official international appearance for New Zealand in a 2–3 loss to New Caledonia on 29 July 1969.
