= Ken Hough =

Australian sportsman

Personal information
- Full name: Kenneth William Hough
- Date of birth: 24 October 1928
- Place of birth: Auburn, New South Wales, Australia
- Date of death: 20 September 2009 (aged 80)
- Place of death: Gladstone, Queensland, Australia
- Position: Goalkeeper

Senior career*
Years	Team	Apps	(Gls)
- Gladesville-Ryde
- North Shore United

International career
1948	Australia	4	(0)
1958	New Zealand	5	(0)
- * Club domestic league appearances and goals

Ken Hough
Cricket information
- Batting: Right-handed
- Bowling: Right-arm medium-fast

International information
- National side: New Zealand
- Test debut (cap 87): 27 February 1959 v England
- Last Test: 14 March 1959 v England

Career statistics
Competition	Test	First-class
Matches	2	28
Runs scored	62	624
Batting average	62.00	16.42
100s/50s	0/0	0/1
Top score	31*	91
Balls bowled	462	7,796
Wickets	6	119
Bowling average	29.16	20.87
5 wickets in innings	0	6
10 wickets in match	0	3
Best bowling	3/79	7/43
Catches/stumpings	1/–	25/–
- Source: Cricinfo, 1 April 2017

Kenneth William Hough (24 October 1928 – 20 September 2009) was a cricketer and association football player who represented both New Zealand and Australia in football. He also represented New Zealand in Test cricket. Hough was born in Auburn, a suburb of Sydney, Australia. He died, aged 80, in Gladstone, Queensland.

== Cricket career ==
A right-arm fast bowler and useful lower-order batsman, Hough played two Tests against England in 1958–59 and 28 first-class matches, mostly for Northern Districts and Auckland, in his career. He took more wickets than anybody else in the 1958–59 Plunket Shield season, with 36 wickets for Auckland at 12.13, including 11 for 93 in the match against Otago and 10 for 110 against Canterbury, to help Auckland to win the championship. He was one of the New Zealand Cricket Almanac's two Players of the Year in 1959. His finest performance was 12 for 146 (7 for 43 and 5 for 103) for Auckland against Central Districts in 1959–60. He played two matches for New Zealand against the Australian team in 1959–60, taking six wickets. They were his last first-class matches.

In the course of his brief career Hough set the Test match record for the most wickets in a complete career (6) without ever dismissing a batsman caught.

== Football career ==
Hough played four matches for the Australian national team in 1948, all against New Zealand.

Hough made his full debut for New Zealand between the posts in a 2–3 loss to Australia on 16 August 1958. and made four more appearances over the following month, the last of his A-international caps being in a 2–1 win over New Caledonia on 14 September 1958.
