= Tommy Farnan =

New Zealand footballer

Personal information
- Full name: Thomas Farnan
- Date of birth: 3 June 1914
- Place of birth: Cork, Ireland
- Date of death: 2 October 1977 (aged 63)
- Place of death: Auckland, New Zealand
- Position: Inside left

Senior career*
Years	Team	Apps	(Gls)
1936	Mosgiel		
1937–?	Ponsonby		

International career
1936	New Zealand	1	(0)
- * Club domestic league appearances and goals

Thomas Farnan (3 June 1914 – 2 October 1977) was an association football player who represented New Zealand at international level.

Farnan made a single appearance in an official international for the All Whites in a 1–7 loss to Australia on 4 July 1936.

Farnan transferred from Ponsonby to Mosgiel on 14 April 1936 for a single season before returning to Ponsonby the following year.
