= Jim Warrender =

New Zealand footballer

Jimmy Warrender
Personal information
- Full name: James Marr Warrender
- Date of birth: 2 April 1931
- Place of birth: Aberdeen, Scotland
- Date of death: 15 October 2012 (aged 81)
- Place of death: Upper Hutt, New Zealand

Youth career
- Banks O' Dee F.C.

Senior career*
Years	Team	Apps	(Gls)
- Railways

International career
1960	New Zealand	2	(0)
- * Club domestic league appearances and goals

James (Jimmy) Marr Warrender (2 April 1931 – 15 October 2012) was a former Scottish New Zealander football (soccer) player who represented New Zealand at an international level.

He was Captain of the Banks O' Dee F.C. side who won the Scottish Junior Cup in 1957, defeating Kilsyth Rangers 1–0 in the final at Hampden Park, Glasgow in front of 30,800 spectators.

Warrender played two official A-international matches for the New Zealand national football team in 1960, both against Pacific minnows Tahiti, the first a 5–1 win on 5 September, the second a 2–1 win on 12 September 1960.
