= Sam Malcolmson =

New Zealand footballer (1947–2024)

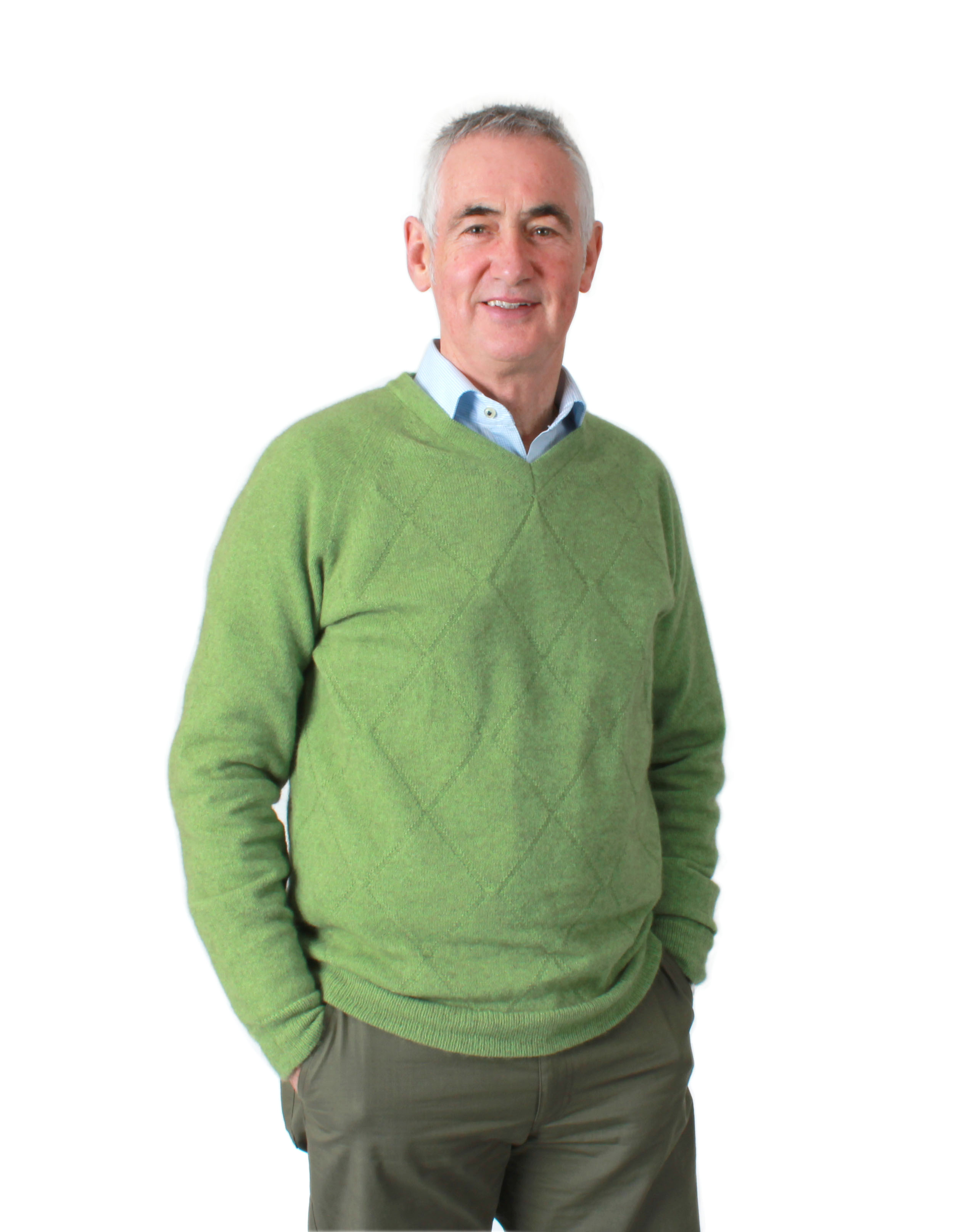
- Malcolmson in 2011

Personal information
- Full name: Samuel Alan Malcolmson
- Date of birth: 2 April 1947
- Place of birth: Dumfries, Scotland
- Date of death: 18 September 2024 (aged 77)
- Place of death: Auckland, New Zealand
- Position: Striker

Senior career*
Years	Team	Apps	(Gls)
1969	Falmouth Town	14	(5)
1971–1972	Airdrieonians	1	(0)
1972	Portadown		
1972	Queen of the South	8	(0)
1972–1973	Portadown		
1973–1974	Albion Rovers	25	(4)
1974–1975	Wellington Diamond		
1976–1978	Stop Out		
1979	Eastern Suburbs		
1981	Manurewa		
1982	East Coast Bays		

International career
1976–1982	New Zealand	15	(2)
- * Club domestic league appearances and goals

Samuel Alan Malcolmson (2 April 1947 – 18 September 2024) was a Scottish-born footballer who represented New Zealand internationally after he became a naturalised New Zealander in 1976. He played for teams in Cornwall, Scotland, Northern Ireland and New Zealand.

== Career in the United Kingdom ==
Malcolmson was born in Cresswell, Dumfries, Scotland, on 2 April 1947. Raised in nearby Dalbeattie, he served in the Royal Navy. At 17, he represented the British Combined Services in association football and athletics. Whilst stationed at RNAS Culdrose in Cornwall, he played 14 games (5 goals) for Falmouth Town. He went on to play for Airdrieonians, then the team from the town of his birth, Queen of the South, and Albion Rovers in his native Scotland. In Northern Ireland, he played with Portadown for two spells. He then emigrated in 1974 to New Zealand.

== New Zealand ==
Malcolmson was often used as a striker and scored more than 50 goals in New Zealand's National League, but he was also comfortable with playing defence.

Malcolmson became a naturalised New Zealander on 28 July 1976, and scored on his full New Zealand men's national team international debut less than two months later in a 2–0 win over Burma on 13 September. He went on to represent the All Whites at the 1982 FIFA World Cup finals in Spain, his sole appearance at the tournament being his last game for New Zealand in a 5–2 defeat against his native Scotland. In doing so, he became the second of three players with Queen of the South among his ex-clubs to travel to the World Cup finals after George Hamilton and before Bernie Slaven. Malcolmson is the only one of the three to actually play at the finals. Including friendlies and unofficial games against club sides, Malcolmson played 32 times for his adopted country, scoring 5 goals, ending his international playing career with 15 official A-international caps and 2 goals to his credit.

=== After playing ===
In 2013, Malcolmson became a founding committee member of the independent group Friends of Football.

Malcolmson died in Auckland on 18 September 2024, at the age of 77.
