= Tony Moynihan =

Scottish-born New Zealand footballer

Personal information
- Full name: Anthony Moynihan
- Place of birth: Scotland

Senior career*
Years	Team	Apps	(Gls)
- Crewe Alexandra
- Inverness Caledonian
- Inverness Thistle
- Eastern Union

International career
1960	New Zealand	2	(0)
- * Club domestic league appearances and goals

Tony Moynihan is a former association football player who represented New Zealand at international level. He also had a very successful club career as well. Playing first team football and 3 big clubs- Starting off at Crewe Alexandra, then moving up north to both Inverness clubs.

Moynihan played two official A-international matches for the New Zealand in 1960, both against Pacific minnows Tahiti, the first a 5–1 win on 5 September, the second a 2–1 win on 12 September 1960.
