= Iain Gillies =

New Zealand footballer (1935–2025)

Personal information
- Full name: John Gillies
- Date of birth: 29 July 1935
- Place of birth: Mallaig, Scotland
- Date of death: 16 April 2025 (aged 89)
- Place of death: Gisborne, New Zealand

Youth career
- 1950: North Shore United

Senior career*
| Years | Team | Apps | (Gls) |
| 1951–1955 | Nairn County | | |
| 1955–1956 | Celtic | | |
| 1956–1958 | Crewe Alexandra | | |
| 1959 | Eastern Union | | |

International career
| 1967 | New Zealand | 1 | (0) |
- * Club domestic league appearances and goals

John "Iain" Gillies (29 July 1935 – 16 April 2025) was an association football player who represented New Zealand at international level.

Gillies spent most of his childhood in Mallaig before his family moved to New Zealand in 1949. He attended Sacred Heart College in Auckland and played for North Shore United. He returned to Scotland in 1950 and played for Nairn County, spending three seasons there from the age of 15.

Gillies signed for Celtic for the 1955–56 season where he played a number of games for the reserves, but did not manage a first team appearance. He was released on a free transfer the following summer and joined Crewe Alexandra.

In 1959, Gillies returned to New Zealand and played for Eastern Union.

Gillies made a solitary official international appearance for New Zealand in a 4–0 loss to New Caledonia on 8 November 1967, which was his final appearance in professional association football.

Gillies died in Gisborne, New Zealand on 16 April 2025 at the age of 89 years. He was survived by his wife Flora and four generations of descendants.
