= Bill Zuill =

New Zealand footballer

Personal information
- Full name: William Henry Zuill
- Date of birth: 29 April 1900
- Place of birth: Salford, Greater Manchester, England
- Date of death: 1960 (aged 59–60)
- Place of death: Purewa, New Zealand
- Position: Goalkeeper

Senior career*
Years	Team	Apps	(Gls)
- Onehunga

International career
1933	New Zealand	3	(0)
- * Club domestic league appearances and goals

William Zuill (29 April 1900 – 1960) was a football (soccer) goalkeeper who represented New Zealand at international level.

In his native England he played for Christian Brethren FC before signing for Mossley and played six games for them in 1923–24 season. He later emigrated to New Zealand.

Zuill played three official A-international matches for the All Whites in 1933, all on tour against trans-Tasman neighbours Australia, the first a 2–4 loss on 5 June 1933, followed by a 4–6 loss and another 2–4 loss on 17 and 24 June respectively.
