= Peter Hall (New Zealand footballer) =

English-born New Zealand footballer

Personal information
- Full name: Peter D Hall
- Place of birth: England

Senior career*
Years	Team	Apps	(Gls)
- Ohakea

International career
1948	New Zealand	3	(0)
- * Club domestic league appearances and goals

Peter Hall is a former association football player who represented New Zealand at international level.

Born in England, Hall emigrated after the war, initially to Australia, but quickly decided New Zealand was more to his liking. He played three official A-international matches for his adopted country in 1948, all against visiting trans-Tasman neighbours Australia, the first a 0–7 loss on 28 August, followed by 0-4 and 1-8 losses on 4 September and 9 September respectively.
