= Arthur Leong (footballer) =

New Zealand footballer (1931–2023)

Personal information
- Full name: Arthur William Leong
- Date of birth: 1931
- Place of birth: Guangzhou, China
- Date of death: 30 August 2023 (aged 92)
- Place of death: Hamilton, New Zealand

Senior career*
Years	Team	Apps	(Gls)
- Hamilton Technical Old Boys

International career
1962	New Zealand	2	(0)
- * Club domestic league appearances and goals

Arthur William Leong (1931 – 30 August 2023) was an association football player who represented New Zealand at international level. Born in Guangzhou, China, he emigrated to New Zealand as a two-year-old and became the first ethnic Chinese player to represent New Zealand in football.

As well as winning a Chatham Cup winners medal as captain of Hamilton Technical Old Boys on the 1st of September at The Basin Reserve, Wellington beating Northern 4–1, Leong played two official A-international matches for the All Whites in 1962 against visitors New Caledonia, the first a 4–1 on 2 June 1962, his second a 4–2 win on 4 June. They were to be his only official matches as New Zealand played no other official matches until 1967.

In December 2013, Arthur and his wife Maureen, a retired midwife, were both awarded Community Awards by the Hamilton City Council at a special ceremony attended by their extended family, for service to the community.

Leong died in Hamilton on 30 August 2023, at the age of 92.
