= Phil Traynor =

New Zealand footballer

Personal information
- Full name: Philip P Traynor
- Place of birth: New Zealand
- Positions: Inside forward; wing-half

Senior career*
Years	Team	Apps	(Gls)
- Waterside
- Seatoun
- North Shore United

International career
1948–1954	New Zealand	11	(0)
- * Club domestic league appearances and goals

Phil Traynor was an association football player who represented New Zealand at international level.

Traynor made his full All Whites debut in a 1–8 loss to Australia on 11 September 1948 and ended his international playing career with 11 A-international caps to his credit, his final cap an appearance in a 1–4 loss to Australia on 4 September 1954.
