= Rodney Reid =

New Zealand sportsman (1939–2022)

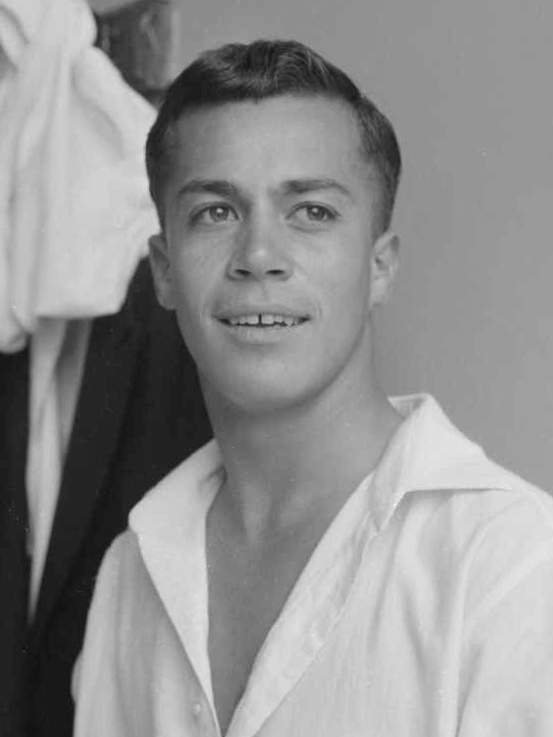
- Reid in 1959

Personal information
- Full name: Rodney Ernest Reid
- Date of birth: 30 July 1939
- Place of birth: Apia, Territory of Western Samoa
- Date of death: 12 May 2022 (aged 82)
- Place of death: Blenheim, New Zealand
- Position: Inside forward

Senior career*
| Years | Team | Apps | (Gls) |
- Miramar Rangers
- Seatoun

International career
| 1958 | New Zealand | 2 | (0) |
- * Club domestic league appearances and goals

Rodney Ernest Reid (30 July 1939 – 12 May 2022) was a New Zealand association football player who represented New Zealand at international level and played first-class cricket for Wellington.

Born in Apia in Western Samoa, Reid played 13 first-class matches for Wellington from 1958–59 to 1960–61, taking 33 wickets at 29.72 with his right-arm medium pace and scoring 205 runs at 12.81. He was considered one of the most promising new players of the 1958–59 Plunket Shield season, the Christchurch Press noting: "His medium-paced bowling was remarkably steady, he averaged 25 with the bat, and he finished the series with a hat-trick against Otago." He took his best figures of 6 for 57 in the second innings when Wellington defeated Auckland by an innings in January 1960.

Reid played two official A-international matches for the New Zealand national football team in 1958. The first was a 2–3 loss against trans-Tasman neighbours Australia on 16 August 1958 and the second was a 5–1 win over New Caledonia on 7 September.
