= Istvan Nemet =

New Zealand footballer

Personal information
- Full name: Istvan Stefan Nemet
- Date of birth: 8 April 1942
- Place of birth: Szabadka, Hungary
- Date of death: 4 November 2015 (aged 73)
- Place of death: Wellington, New Zealand
- Height: 1.78 m (5 ft 10 in)
- Positions: Right wing; left wing; midfielder

Youth career
- 1954–1957: Sever (Yugoslavia)

International career
Years	Team	Apps	(Gls)
1967	New Zealand	4	(2)

Istvan Nemet (Hungarian: Németh István) is a former association football player who represented New Zealand at international level.

== Career ==
Istvan Stefan Nemet played four official A-international matches for New Zealand in 1967, the first three of which were at the Vietnam National Day Soccer Tournament. He scored on his debut in a 3–5 loss to trans-Tasman neighbours Australia on 5 November 1967, followed by a 3–1 win over Singapore on 8 November and a 1–5 loss to South Vietnam on 10 November 1967. He scored the second of his 2 goals in his final official appearance, an 8–2 win over Malaysia on 16 November 1967.
