= Keith Gibson (footballer) =

New Zealand footballer

Personal information
- Full name: Keith C Gibson
- Place of birth: New Zealand

Senior career*
| Years | Team | Apps | (Gls) |
- Seatoun

International career
| 1954 | New Zealand | 1 | (0) |
- * Club domestic league appearances and goals

Keith Gibson is a former association football player who represented New Zealand at international level.

Gibson made a solitary official international appearance for New Zealand in a 1–4 loss to Australia on 4 September 1954.
