= Julius Beck =

New Zealand footballer

Personal information
- Full name: Julius Beck
- Place of birth: Hungary

Senior career*
| Years | Team | Apps | (Gls) |
- Hungaria

International career
| 1967 | New Zealand | 1 | (0) |
- * Club domestic league appearances and goals

Julius Beck (Hungarian: Beck Gyula) is a former association football player who represented New Zealand at international level.

Beck made a solitary official international appearance for New Zealand in a 4–0 loss to New Caledonia on 8 November 1967.
