= Imre Kiss (New Zealand footballer) =

Hungarian-born New Zealand footballer

Personal information
- Place of birth: Budapest, Hungary

Senior career*
Years	Team	Apps	(Gls)
- Hungaria

International career
1967	New Zealand	1	(0)
- * Club domestic league appearances and goals

Imre Kiss is a former association football player who represented New Zealand at international level.

Kiss began his playing career in the national league of his native Hungary before defecting to West Germany.

Kiss moved to New Zealand and played for Hungaria in Wellington in the 1960s before making a solitary official international appearance for New Zealand in a 4–0 loss to New Caledonia on 8 November 1967.

Kiss has lived in New Plymouth, New Zealand since the 1990s.
