= New Zealand men's national football team results (1922–1969) =

This page details the match results and statistics of the New Zealand men's national football team from its first match in 1922 until the second match against Israel in 1969.

== Key ==
Key to matches

- Att. = Match attendance
- (H) = Home ground
- (A) = Away ground
- (N) = Neutral ground

Key to record by opponent

- Pld = Games played
- W = Games won
- D = Games drawn
- L = Games lost
- GF = Goals for
- GA = Goals against

== A-International results ==
New Zealand's score is shown first in each case.

No.	Date	Venue	Opponents	Score	Competition	New Zealand scorers	Att.	Ref.
1	17 June 1922	Carisbrook, Dunedin (H)	Australia	3–1	Soccer Ashes	Cook (2), Knott	—	
2	24 June 1922	Athletic Park, Wellington (H)	Australia	1–1	Soccer Ashes	Cook	—	
3	8 July 1922	Auckland Domain, Auckland (H)	Australia	3–1	Soccer Ashes	Ballard, Cook, Dacre	—	
4	9 June 1923	Brisbane Cricket Ground, Brisbane (A)	Australia	1–2	Soccer Ashes	Dacre	—	
5	16 June 1923	Sydney Cricket Ground, Sydney (A)	Australia	3–2	Soccer Ashes	Campbell (3)	—	
6	30 June 1923	Newcastle Showgrounds, Newcastle (A)	Australia	4–1	Soccer Ashes	Campbell (4)	—	
7	25 June 1927	Dunedin (H)	Canada	2–2	Friendly	Hislop, Innes	—	
8	5 July 1927	Christchurch (H)	Canada	1–2	Friendly	Spencer	—	
9	9 July 1927	Wellington (H)	Canada	1–0	Friendly	McCormack	—	
10	23 July 1927	Auckland (H)	Canada	1–4	Friendly	Hooper	—	
11	5 June 1933	Brisbane Exhibition Grounds, Brisbane (A)	Australia	2–4	Soccer Ashes	Chapman, Kershaw	—	
12	17 June 1933	Sydney Cricket Ground, Sydney (A)	Australia	4–6	Soccer Ashes	Chapman, Ives, Kay, Kershaw	—	
13	24 June 1933	Sydney Cricket Ground, Sydney (A)	Australia	2–4	Soccer Ashes	Kershaw (A)	—	
14	4 July 1936	Logan Park, Dunedin (H)	Australia	1–7	Soccer Ashes	Skinner	—	
15	11 July 1936	Athletic Park, Wellington (H)	Australia	0–10	Soccer Ashes		—	
16	18 July 1936	Blandford Park, Auckland (H)	Australia	1–4	Soccer Ashes	Haggett	—	
17	28 June 1947	Christchurch (H)	South Africa	5–6	Friendly	Smith (3), Mason, Wood	—	
18	5 July 1947	Dunedin (H)	South Africa	0–6	Friendly		—	
19	12 July 1947	Wellington (H)	South Africa	3–8	Friendly	Smith (3)	—	
20	19 July 1947	Auckland (H)	South Africa	1–4	Friendly	Smith	—	
21	14 August 1948	Basin Reserve, Wellington (H)	Australia	0–6	Soccer Ashes		—	
22	28 August 1948	Lancaster Park, Christchurch (H)	Australia	0–7	Soccer Ashes		—	
23	4 September 1948	Basin Reserve, Wellington (H)	Australia	0–4	Soccer Ashes		—	
24	11 September 1948	Blandford Park, Auckland (H)	Australia	1–8	Friendly	Masters	—	
25	19 September 1951	Nouméa (A)	New Caledonia	0–2	Friendly		—	
26	22 September 1951	Nouméa (A)	New Caledonia	6–4	Friendly	Newall (4), Fleet, Walsh	—	
27	24 September 1951	Nouméa (A)	New Caledonia	0–2	Friendly		—	
28	30 September 1951	Nouméa (A)	New Caledonia	3–1	Friendly	Coxon (2), Fleet	—	
29	4 October 1951	Nouméa (N)	New Hebrides	9–0	Friendly	Coxon (3), Walsh (3), Newall (2), Fleet	—	
30	7 October 1951	Suva (A)	Fiji	6–4	Friendly	Newall (3), Coxon, McKissock, Mutimer	—	
31	7 September 1952	Suva (A)	Fiji	2–0	Friendly	Hope-Ede, White	—	
32	14 September 1952	Lautoka (A)	Fiji	9–0	Friendly	Newall (3), Kendrick (2), Quickenden (2), White, Own goal	—	
33	16 September 1952	Suva (A)	Fiji	5–2	Friendly	Coxon (2), Kendrick (2), White	—	
34	21 September 1952	Papeete (A)	Tahiti	2–2	Friendly	Coxon, Newall	—	
35	28 September 1952	Papeete (A)	Tahiti	5–3	Friendly	Newall (4), Coxon	—	
36	14 August 1954	Melbourne (A)	Australia	2–1	Soccer Ashes	King, Steele Jr.	—	
37	28 August 1954	Brisbane (A)	Australia	1–4	Soccer Ashes	Smith	—	
38	4 September 1954	Sydney (A)	Australia	1–4	Soccer Ashes	Steele Jr.	—	
39	16 August 1958	Basin Reserve, Wellington (H)	Australia	2–3	Friendly	Aird, Hume	—	
40	23 August 1958	Carlaw Park, Auckland (H)	Australia	2–2	Friendly	Steele Jr. (2)	—	
41	31 August 1958	Nouméa (A)	New Caledonia	2–1	Friendly	McLaren, Steele Jr.	—	
42	7 September 1958	Nouméa (A)	New Caledonia	5–1	Friendly	Hume (3), Cuthill, Steele Jr.	—	
43	14 September 1958	Nouméa (A)	New Caledonia	2–1	Friendly	Hume (2)	—	
44	5 September 1960	Papeete (A)	Tahiti	5–1	Friendly	Charlton (2), Raat (2), Bell	—	
45	12 September 1960	Papeete (A)	Tahiti	2–1	Friendly	Charlton, Raat	—	
46	2 June 1962	Christchurch (H)	New Caledonia	4–1	Friendly	McVey (2), Pugh (2)	—	
47	4 June 1962	Wellington (H)	New Caledonia	4–2	Friendly	Armstrong (3), Ormond	—	
48	5 November 1967	Saigon (N)	Australia	3–5	1967 South Vietnam Independence Cup	Mears, Nemet, Shaw	—	
49	8 November 1967	Nouméa (A)	New Caledonia	0–4	Friendly		—	
50	8 November 1967	Saigon (N)	Singapore	3–1	1967 South Vietnam Independence Cup	Thomas (2), Turner	—	
51	10 November 1967	Saigon (N)	South Vietnam	1–5	1967 South Vietnam Independence Cup	Shaw	—	
52	16 November 1967	Kuala Lumpur (A)	Malaysia	8–2	Friendly	Shaw (3), Ferrier, Legg, Mears, Nemet, Turner	—	
53	17 September 1968	Auckland (H)	Fiji	5–0	Friendly	Shaw (3), Haydon, Legg	—	
54	8 October 1968	Auckland (H)	New Caledonia	1–3	Friendly	Breslin	—	
55	25 July 1969	Nouméa (A)	New Caledonia	0–0	Friendly		—	
56	27 July 1969	Nouméa (A)	New Caledonia	0–2	Friendly		—	
57	29 July 1969	Nouméa (A)	New Caledonia	2–3	Friendly	Bilby, de Graaf	—	
58	16 September 1969	Singapore (A)	Singapore	2–0	Friendly	de Graaf, Mears	—	
59	28 September 1969	Tel Aviv (A)	Israel	0–4	1970 FIFA World Cup qualification		—	
60	1 October 1969	Tel Aviv (A)	Israel	0–2	1970 FIFA World Cup qualification		—	

== Best/worst results ==
Best
Date	Opposition	Result
4 October 1951	New Hebrides	9–0
14 September 1952	Fiji	9–0
16 November 1967	Malaysia	8–2

Worst
Date	Opposition	Result
11 July 1936	Australia	0–10
11 September 1948	Australia	1–8
28 August 1958	Australia	0–7
4 July 1936	Australia	1–7
5 July 1947	South Africa	0–6
14 August 1948	Australia	0–6

Highest Aggregate
Date	Opposition	Result
28 June 1947	South Africa	5–6
12 July 1947	South Africa	3–8
17 June 1933	Australia	4–6
11 July 1936	Australia	0–10
22 September 1951	New Caledonia	6–4
16 November 1967	Malaysia	8–2

== Streaks ==
- Most wins in a row
  - 7, 31 August 1958–4 June 1962
  - 6, 30 September 1951–16 September 1952
- Most matches without a loss
  - 9, 30 September 1951–14 August 1954
- Most losses in a row
  - 16, 23 July 1927–19 September 1951
- Most matches without a win
  - 16, 23 July 1927–19 September 1951

== Results by opposition ==
Team	Pld	W	D	L	GF	GA	GD	WPCT
Australia	22	5	2	15	37	87	−50	22.73
Canada	4	1	1	2	5	8	−3	25.00
Fiji	5	5	0	0	27	6	+21	100.00
Israel	2	0	0	2	0	6	−6	0.00
Malaysia	1	1	0	0	8	2	+6	100.00
New Caledonia	14	7	1	6	29	27	+2	50.00
Singapore	2	2	0	0	5	1	+4	100.00
South Africa	4	0	0	4	9	24	−15	0.00
South Vietnam	1	0	0	1	1	5	−4	0.00
Tahiti	4	3	1	0	14	7	+7	75.00
Vanuatu (Note: Includes results as New Hebrides.)	1	1	0	0	9	0	+9	100.00
Total	60	25	5	30	144	173	−29	41.67

Source: A-International results

== Results by year ==
Per Year
Year	Pld	W	D	L	GF	GA	GD
1922	3	2	1	0	7	3	+4
1923	3	2	0	1	8	5	+3
1927	4	1	1	2	5	8	–3
1933	3	0	0	3	8	14	–6
1936	3	0	0	3	2	21	–19
1947	4	0	0	4	9	24	–15
1948	4	0	0	4	1	25	–24
1951	6	4	0	2	24	13	+11
1952	5	4	1	0	23	7	+16
1954	3	1	0	2	4	9	–5
1958	5	3	1	1	13	8	+5
1960	2	2	0	0	7	2	+5
1962	2	2	0	0	8	3	+5
1967	5	2	0	3	15	17	–2
1968	2	1	0	1	6	3	+3
1969	6	1	1	4	4	11	–7

Cumulative
Year	Pld	W	D	L	GF	GA	GD
1922	3	2	1	0	7	3	+4
1923	6	4	1	1	15	8	+7
1927	10	5	2	3	20	16	+4
1933	13	5	2	6	28	30	–2
1936	16	5	2	9	30	51	–21
1947	20	5	2	13	39	75	–36
1948	24	5	2	17	40	100	–60
1951	30	9	2	19	64	113	–49
1952	35	13	3	19	87	120	–33
1954	38	14	3	21	91	129	–38
1958	43	17	4	22	104	137	–33
1960	45	19	4	22	111	139	–28
1962	47	21	4	22	119	142	–23
1967	52	23	4	25	134	159	–25
1968	54	24	4	26	140	162	–22
1969	60	25	5	30	144	173	–29

== See also ==
- New Zealand national football team
- New Zealand at the FIFA World Cup
- New Zealand at the FIFA Confederations Cup
- New Zealand at the OFC Nations Cup
