= 1987 Chatham Cup =

Tournament details
- Venue(s): first leg: Childers Road Reserve, Gisborne second leg: Queen Elizabeth II Park, Christchurch
- Dates: first leg, 4 October 1987; second leg, 11 October 1987

Final positions
- Champions: Gisborne City (1st title)
- Runners-up: Christchurch United

Awards
- Jack Batty Memorial Cup: Dave Reynolds, Gisborne City

The 1987 Chatham Cup was the 60th annual nationwide knockout football competition in New Zealand.

Up to the last 16 of the competition, the cup was run in three regions (northern, central, and southern). National League teams received a bye until the final 32 stage. In all, 143 teams took part in the competition. Note: Different sources give different numberings for the rounds of the competition: some start round one with the beginning of the regional qualifications; others start numbering from the first national knock-out stage. The former numbering scheme is used in this article.

== The 1987 final ==
As with the 1986 competition, the final was held over two legs, one at the home ground of each finalist. In all, ten goals were scored in the two matches, a record for a finals competition (though not normally considered as a record for a final, due to the two-legged nature of the tie). The two teams involved, Gisborne City and Christchurch United, also finished first and second in the year's national league, though in that competition Christchurch had the upper hand.

The first leg, held in Gisborne, was an exciting if one-sided affair, with a high standard of play. Gisborne City's first goal came in just the third minute, through Fijian player Stan Morrell. Paul Nixon was the second to get his name in the scorebook, and at the break it was 2–0. Morell got a second ten minutes after the interval, but the last 20 minutes of the match saw a flurry of goals, with Johan Verweij reducing the deficit before two late strikes from Kevin Birch and Steve Sumner stretched the Gisborne tally to five.

Christchurch had their work cut out to pull back a four-goal deficit at their home ground, and though this was never likely, the game was an enjoyable one. The score seesawed, with Gisborne twice coming back to equalise after going a goal down to the hosts. Paul Nicholls put the southerners ahead, but Sean Byrne's equaliser took the teams to the half-time break level. In the 75th minute Allan Carville doubled the Christchurch total, but a late penalty strike from Brian Strutt ensured that the second leg would finish 2–2.

The Jack Batty Memorial Trophy for player of the final was awarded to Gisborne City goalkeeper Dave Reynolds.

== Results ==
=== Third Round ===
Christchurch Technical	2 – 0	Waihopai (Invercargill)

Eastern Suburbs (Auckland)	0 – 4	Manurewa

Ellerslie	1 – 0	Oratia United

Green Bay-Titirangi	1 – 2	Manukau City

Green Island	3 – 1	Canterbury University

Hutt Valley United	0 – 2	Gisborne City

Invercargill Thistle	0 – 2	Burndale United (Christchurch)

Kawerau Town	1 – 2	South Auckland Rangers

Lynndale (Auckland)	5 – 2	Mount Roskill

Massey University	2 – 0	Wellington United

Mount Maunganui	4 – 0	Onehunga-Mangere United

Mount Wellington	0 – 3	North Shore United

Naenae	0 – 1	Wellington Olympic

Napier City Rovers	8 – 0	North Wellington

Nelson United	4 – 0	Gisborne Thistle

New Plymouth Old Boys	1 – 1*	Havelock North Wanderers

New Plymouth United	1 – 4	Wainuiomata

Otahuhu United	0 – 1	Howick

Papatoetoe	4 – 2	Waitemata City

Point Chevalier	0 – 1	Metro (Auckland)

Porirua Viard United	4 – 2	Island Bay United

Raumati Hearts	1 – 3	Miramar Rangers

Shamrock (Christchurch)	1 – 2	Mosgiel

Stokes Valley	0 – 3	Moturoa

Takapuna City	1 – 0	Glenfield Rovers

Victoria University	0 – 9	Manawatu

Waterside (Wellington)	1 – 0	Stop Out (Lower Hutt)

West Auckland	4 – 0	Auckland University

* Won on penalties by New Plymouth (5–4)

=== Fourth Round ===
Burndale United	3 – 0	Green Island

Howick	2 – 1	Takapuna City

Lynndale	0 – 1	Manurewa

Manawatu	0 – 1	Massey University

Manukau City	2 – 2*	West Auckland

Mosgiel	0 – 2	Christchurch Technical

Moturoa	1 – 5	Napier City Rovers

Nelson United	1 – 3	Miramar Rangers

North Shore United	1 – 0	Metro

Papatoetoe	2 – 3	Ellerslie

South Auckland Rangers	1 – 3	Mount Maunganui

Wainuiomata	0 – 5	Gisborne City

Waterside	3 – 1	Porirua Viard United

Wellington Olympic	1 – 3	New Plymouth Old Boys

* Won on penalties by Manukau City (4–1)

Christchurch United and Dunedin City both received byes to the Fifth Round

=== Fifth Round ===
Burndale United	1 – 4	Christchurch United

Dunedin City	5 – 3 (aet)	Christchurch Technical

Gisborne City	3 – 2	Napier City Rovers

Howick	1 – 3	Mount Maunganui

Manukau City	2 – 1	Ellerslie

Miramar Rangers	0 – 3	Waterside

New Plymouth Old Boys	1 – 2	Massey University

North Shore United	2 – 1	Manurewa

=== Sixth Round ===
Christchurch United	3 – 2	Massey University

Dunedin City	1 – 4	Gisborne City

Manukau City	1 – 1 (aet)*	Waterside

Mount Maunganui	0 – 2	North Shore United

* Manukau City won 4–3 on penalties

=== Semi-finals ===
Gisborne City	1 – 0	North Shore United

Manukau City	0 – 5	Christchurch United

=== Final ===
4 October 1987

Gisborne City	5 – 1	Christchurch United
Morell 2, Nixon, Birch, Sumner		Verweij

Childers Road Reserve, Gisborne
Referee: K. Wallace
11 October 1987

Christchurch United	2 – 2	Gisborne City
Nicholls, Carville		Byrne, Strutt (pen.)

Queen Elizabeth II Park, Christchurch
Referee: K. Wallace

Gisborne City won 7–3 on aggregate.
