= 1976 Chatham Cup =

Tournament details
- Venue(s): Queen Elizabeth II Park, Christchurch
- Dates: 4 September 1976

Final positions
- Champions: Christchurch United (4th title)
- Runners-up: Eastern Suburbs

The 1976 Chatham Cup was the 49th annual nationwide knockout football competition in New Zealand.

Early stages of the competition were run in three regions (northern, central, and southern), with the National League teams receiving a bye until the later stages of the competition. In all, 146 teams took part in the competition - a record for the time. Note: Different sources give different numberings for the rounds of the competition: some start round one with the beginning of the regional qualifications; others start numbering from the first national knock-out stage. The former numbering scheme is used in this article.

== The 1976 final ==
Christchurch United, coached by Terry Conley, became only the second team (after Waterside in 1938–40) to win the cup on three successive occasions. Seven players played on all three winning sides, among them future New Zealand captain Steve Sumner. Three of these players (Graham Griffiths, Brian Hardman, and Ian Park) had also played in Christchurch United's winning side in the 1972 final.

The final against Eastern Suburbs was a one-sided affair (United had had a harder task in their semi-final against Blockhouse Bay). The South Island side scored four, though the first of these was an own goal by Suburbs' Tom Bell. Norman Moran picked up a brace before the scoring was completed by Mark McNaughton.

== Results ==
=== Third round ===
Brooklyn Northern United	0 – 1	Lower Hutt City

Claudelands Rovers	2 – 0	Huntly Thistle

East Coast Bays	3 – 2	Howick

Eden	0 – 0*	Whangarei City

Glen Carron (Palmerston North)	1 – 0	Kiwi United (Palmerston North)

Manawatu United (Palmerston N.)	1 – 0	Taranaki United (New Plymouth)

Massey (Auckland)	0 – 1	Cornwall (Auckland)

Mount Roskill	1 – 2	Takapuna City

Napier City Rovers	2 – 1	Gisborne HSOB

Nelson Metro	4 – 2	Motueka

Newlands Paparangi	2 – 3	Island Bay United

Old Boys (Invercargill)	0 – 5	Invercargill United

Papatoetoe	0 – 2	Manurewa

Petone	1 – 1*	Seatoun

Queens Park (Invercargill)	1 – 8	Dunedin City

Rotorua Suburbs	0 – 7	Rotorua City

Shamrock (Christchurch)	1 – 8	Rangers (Christchurch)

Southland Boys' High School	0 – 6	Invercargill Thistle

Turangi Wanderers	1 –14	Hamilton

Wainuiomata	0 – 3	Nelson United

Waterside (Wellington)	2 – 1	North Wellington

Woolston WMC	3 – 4	Papanui Suburbs

* Won on penalties by Whangarei (5–2) and Petone (3–0)

=== Fourth round ===
Caversham	1 – 2	Christchurch United

Rangers	3 – 0	Papanui Suburbs

Claudelands Rovers	0 – 4	Cornwall

East Coast Bays	0 – 2	North Shore United

Hamilton	0 – 1	Blockhouse Bay

Invercargill Thistle	0 – 4	Dunedin City

Manurewa	2 – 4	Eastern Suburbs (Auckland)

Manawatu United	4 – 3	Lower Hutt City

Napier City Rovers	2 – 3	Gisborne City

Nelson United	6 – 0	Glen Carron

New Brighton	10 – 0	Invercargill United

Petone	1 – 2	Wellington Diamond United

Rotorua City	4 – 0	Takapuna City

Stop Out (Lower Hutt)	7 – 2	Island Bay United

Waterside	5 – 3	Nelson Metro

Whangarei City	2 – 2*	Mount Wellington

* Won on penalties by Mt. Wellington (4–2)

=== Fifth round ===
Blockhouse Bay	2 – 2 (aet)*	Mount Wellington

Cornwall	3 – 4	Eastern Suburbs

Dunedin City	0 – 0 (aet)*	New Brighton

Gisborne City	1 – 0	Stop Out

Manawatu United	2 – 1	Wellington Diamond United

Rangers	2 – 3 (aet)	Christchurch United

Rotorua City	1 – 1 (aet)*	North Shore United

Waterside	0 – 2	Nelson United

* Won on penalties by Blockhouse Bay (4–3), New Brighton (4–3), and North Shore United (4–3)

=== Sixth Round ===
Christchurch United	3 – 0	Gisborne City

Eastern Suburbs	3 – 1	North Shore United

Manawatu United	2 – 3	Blockhouse Bay

Nelson United	0 – 1	New Brighton

=== Semi-finals ===
Blockhouse Bay (soccer)	2 – 2	Christchurch United

New Brighton	0 – 1	Eastern Suburbs

==== Semi-final replay ====
Blockhouse Bay (soccer)	0 – 1	Christchurch United

=== Final ===
4 September 1976

Christchurch United	4 – 0	Eastern Suburbs
Moran 2, Bell (o.g.), McNaughton

Queen Elizabeth II Park, Christchurch
Referee: T.G. Delahunty
