= List of first association football internationals per country: 1940–1962 =

The following is a list of first official international association football matches for each (present or past) member of FIFA, played between 1940 and 1962. The matches are listed chronologically.

== List of matches ==
=== Croatia ===
2 April 1940 Friendly	Croatia	4–0	Switzerland	HSK Gradjanski Stadium, Zagreb
	Matekalo 46'; Cimermančić 70', 82'; Lešnik 84'	RSSSF reportEU-Football report		Attendance: 10,000; Referee: Giuseppe Scarpi (Italy)

=== Lebanon ===
27 April 1940 Friendly	Mandatory Palestine	5–1	Lebanon	Maccabiah Stadium, Tel Aviv
	Meitner 2'; Schneiderovitz 11'; Machlis 32'; Kaspi 40', 60'	Report	Cordahi 50'	Attendance: 10,000; Referee: John Blackwell (England)

=== Puerto Rico ===
12 November 1940 Friendly	Cuba	1–1	Puerto Rico	Havana
	Not known (?)		Not known (?)

=== Afghanistan and Iran ===
25 August 1941 Friendly	Afghanistan	0–0	Iran	Ghazi Stadium, Kabul
		Report		Attendance: 10,000

=== Syria ===
26 April 1942 Friendly	Lebanon	1–2	Syria	AUB Stadium, Beirut
	Abou Nader 30'			Attendance: 3,000; Referee: Tringle (England)

=== Tanzania ===
1945 Gossage Cup	Tanganyika	0–7	Uganda	Nakivubo Stadium, Kampala
			Not known (?)

=== Iceland ===
17 July 1946 Friendly	Iceland	0–3	Denmark	Reykjavík
		Report	Christiansen (?); Hansen (?); Sørensen (?)

=== Albania ===
17 July 1946 Balkan Cup	Albania	2–3	Yugoslavia	Qemal Stafa Stadium, Tirana
	Mirashi 6'; Teliti 8'	Report	Matošić 49'; Bobek 52'; Čajkovski 57'	Attendance: 20,000; Referee: Radu Istrate (Romania)

=== Zimbabwe and Zambia ===
1946 Friendly	Southern Rhodesia	0–4	Northern Rhodesia	Salisbury
			Not known (?)

=== Ethiopia and Djibouti ===
15 May 1947 Friendly	Ethiopia	5–0	(France) French Somaliland	Addis Ababa Stadium, Addis Ababa
	Not known (?)

=== Madagascar and Mauritius ===
1947 Triangular Tournament	Madagascar (France)	1–2	Mauritius	Mahamasina Municipal Stadium, Antananarivo
	Not known (?)		Not known (?)

=== China PR ===
2 August 1948 Olympic Games	Turkey	4–0	China	Green Pond Road, Walthamstow, England
	Kılıç 18' 61'; Saygun 72'; Küçükandonyadis 87'	Report		Attendance: 3,000; Referee: Johann Beck (Austria)

=== South Korea ===
2 August 1948 Olympic Games	South Korea	5–3	Mexico	Champion Hill, Dulwich, England
	Choi Song-Gon 13'; Bai Chon-Go 30'; Chung Kook-Chin 63' 66'; Chung Nam-Sik 87'	Report	Cárdenas 23'; Figueroa 85'; Ruiz 89'	Attendance: 6,500; Referee: Leo Lemesic (Yugoslavia)

=== Israel ===
26 September 1948 Friendly	USA Olympic Team (United States)	3–1	Israel	Giants Stadium, New York City, United States
	Souza 14', 57' McLaughlin 44'		Ben-Dror 20'	Attendance: 35,000; Referee: Coggin

=== Hong Kong ===
1 January 1949 Friendly	Hong Kong	2–5	South Korea	Hong Kong
	Not known (?)		Not known (?)

=== Vietnam ===
16 January 1949 Friendly	Vietnam	3–3	South Korea	Saigon
	Not known (?)		Not known (?)

=== Macau ===
25 January 1949 Friendly	Macau	1–5	South Korea	Macau
	Not known (?)		Not known (?)

=== Cyprus ===
30 July 1949 Friendly	Israel	3–1	Cyprus	Tel Aviv
	Not known (?)		Not known (?)

=== Sierra Leone and Nigeria ===
10 August 1949 Friendly	Sierra Leone	0–2	Nigeria	Freetown
			Not known (?)

=== Ghana ===
28 May 1950 Friendly	Gold Coast	1–0	Nigeria	Accra
	Not known (?)

=== Pakistan ===
27 October 1950 Friendly	Iran	5–1	Pakistan	Amjadieh Stadium, Tehran
	Boromand (?); Shakibi (?); Khatami (?)	Report	Wahid (?)	Attendance: 17,000

=== Saarland ===
22 November 1950 Friendly	Saar	5–3	Switzerland "B"	Ludwigparkstadion, Saarbrücken
	Berg 3'; Leibenguth 11', 75'; Martin 14', 65'		Albert Stoll 51', 57'; Hügi 69'	Attendance: 16,000; Referee: Léon Boes (France)

=== Myanmar ===
5 March 1951 Asian Games	Iran	2–0	Burma	National Stadium, New Delhi
	Afshar 17'; Kouzehkanani 60'	Report		Attendance: 17,000

=== New Caledonia ===
19 September 1951 Friendly	New Caledonia	2–0	New Zealand	Nouméa
	Not known (?)

=== Vanuatu ===
4 October 1951 Friendly	New Hebrides	0–9	New Zealand	Nouméa, New Caledonia
			Coxon (?); Walsh (?); Newall (?); Fleet (?)

=== Fiji ===
7 October 1951 Friendly	Fiji	4–6	New Zealand	Suva
	Not known (?)		Newall (?); Coxon (?); McKissock (?); Mutimer (?)

=== Sri Lanka ===
1 January 1952 Friendly	Ceylon	0–2	Pakistan	Colombo
			Not known (?)

=== East Germany ===
21 September 1952 Friendly	Poland	3–0	East Germany	Stadion Wojska Polskiego, Warsaw
	Trampisz 70'; Anioła 80', 84'			Attendance: 25,000; Referee: Sándor Harangozó (Hungary)

=== Tahiti ===
21 September 1952 Friendly	French Polynesia	2–2	New Zealand	Papeete
	Not known (?)		Coxon (?); Newall (?)

=== Singapore ===
11 April 1953 Friendly	Singapore	2–3	South Korea	Singapore
	Not known (?)		Choi Chung-min (?); Park Il-kap (?); Not known (?)

=== Malaysia ===
13 April 1953 Friendly	Malaya	2–3	South Korea	Singapore
	Not known (?)		Not known (?)

=== Palestine ===
26 July 1953 Pan Arab Games	Egypt	8–1	Palestine	Alexandria Stadium, Alexandria
	Qadoura 10'; Shareef El-Far 25'; Ad-Diba 34', 37', 42', 60'; El-Dhizui 50', 80'		17' Farah

=== Libya ===
29 July 1953 Pan Arab Games	Egypt	10–2	Libya	Alexandria Stadium, Alexandria
	Rous 4'; El-Dhizui 19', 56', 69', 77'; Ad-Diba 46', 79', 88'; Qadoura 65' ? (?)		35' Zantouni; 60' (pen.) Al-Houni

=== Jordan ===
1 August 1953 Pan Arab Games	Syria	3–1	Jordan	Alexandria Stadium, Alexandria, Egypt
	Al-Aqqad 28', 75'; Yaqoub 35'		15' ?

=== Chinese Taipei ===
1 May 1954 Asian Games	Taiwan	3–2	Vietnam	Rizal Memorial Stadium, Manila
	Lee Tai-fai 17'; Chu Wing-keung 37' (pen.); Yiu Cheuk-yin 50'		Nguyễn Văn Tư 41'; Trần Văn Ứng 65'

=== Cambodia ===
17 March 1956 Asian Cup qualifier	Cambodia	2–3	Malaya	Phnom-Penh
	Not known (?)		Not known (?)

=== North Vietnam ===
4 October 1956 Three Nations Tournament	China	5–3	North Vietnam	Beijing
	Not known (?)		Not known (?)

=== North Korea ===
7 October 1956 Three Nations Tournament	China	0–1	North Korea	Beijing
			Not known (?)

=== Togo ===
13 October 1956 Friendly	French Togoland (Togo)	1–1	Gold Coast	Stade Agoè-Nyivé, Lomé
	Not known (?)		Not known (?)

=== Sudan ===
16 November 1956 Friendly	Ethiopia	2–1	Sudan	Addis Ababa Stadium, Addis Ababa
	Not known (?)		Not known (?)

=== Thailand ===
1956 Friendly	South Vietnam	3–1	Thailand	South Vietnam
	Not known (?)		Not known (?)

=== Malta ===
24 February 1957 Friendly	Malta	2–3	Austria "B"	Ta' Qali National Stadium, Gżira
	Cauchi 86'; Nicholl 89'	Report	Bonnici 16' (o.g.); Wagner 72'; Haummer 78'	Attendance: 17,421; Referee: Vincenzo Orlandini (Italy)

=== Algeria ===
1 June 1957 Friendly	Tunisia	1–2	Algeria	Tunisia
	Not known (?)		Not known (?)

=== Saudi Arabia ===
18 October 1957 Pan Arab Games	Lebanon	1–1	Saudi Arabia	Camille Chamoun Stadium, Beirut
	Kayyal 30'	Report	Altonian 22'

=== Morocco and Iraq ===
19 October 1957 Pan Arab Games	Morocco	3–3	Iraq	Beirut, Lebanon
	El-Madani (?); Benchekroun (?)	Report	Ammo Baba 48'; Eshaya 50'; Salman 63'

=== Benin ===
8 November 1959 Nkrumah Cup	Dahomey	0–1	Nigeria	Cotonou
			Onyeanwuna (?)

=== Ivory Coast ===
13 April 1960 French Community Games	Ivory Coast	3–2	Dahomey	Antananarivo, Madagascar
	Not known (?)		Not known (?)

=== Burkina Faso and Gabon ===
13 April 1960 French Community Games	Upper Volta	5–4	Gabon	Antananarivo, Madagascar
	Not known (?)		Not known (?)

=== Cameroon ===
13 April 1960 French Community Games	Cameroon	9–2	(France) Djibouti	Antananarivo, Madagascar
	Not known (?); Not known (?)		Not known (?)

=== Mali and Central African Republic ===
13 April 1960 French Community Games	Mali	4–3	Central African Republic	Antananarivo, Madagascar
	Not known (?)		Not known (?)

=== Congo ===
13 April 1960 French Community Games	Congo	4–1	Réunion	Antananarivo, Madagascar
	Not known (?)		Not known (?)

=== Guinea ===
2 October 1960 Friendly	Nigeria	4–1	Guinea	Onikan Stadium, Lagos
	Ekpe (?); Emenako (?); Amusa (?); Fayemi (?)	Report	Not known (?)

=== Mongolia ===
3 October 1960 Communist Tournament	North Vietnam	3–1	Mongolia	Hanoi, North Vietnam
		Report		Stadium: Hàng Đẫy Stadium

=== Kuwait ===
3 September 1961 Pan Arab Games	Kuwait	2–2	Libya	Casablanca, Morocco
		Report

=== Laos ===
12 December 1961 Southeast Asian Peninsular Games	South Vietnam	7–0	Laos	Rangoon, Burma
		Report

=== Senegal ===
31 December 1961 Friendly tournament	Dahomey	4–3	Senegal	Abidjan, Ivory Coast
	Not known (?)		Not known (?)

=== Malawi ===
15 October 1962 Friendly	Malawi (Federation of Rhodesia and Nyasaland)	0–12	Ghana	Blantyre
			Not known (?); Not known (?)

=== Gambia ===
5 December 1962 Friendly	Gambia	3–2	Senegal	Banjul
	Not known (?)		Not known (?)

== See also ==
- List of first association football internationals per country: before 1940
- List of first association football internationals per country: since 1962

== Notes ==
A. RSSSF list three matches played in Hong Kong in 1949, 1950 and 1953 between "China" and South Korea whose status is not officially recognized by FIFA.
B.Prior to Algerian independence in 1962, matches were organised under the auspices of the Front de Libération Nationale.
C.There is some confusion as to the order and results of the two matches played between Cambodia and Malaya in the 1956 Asian Cup Qualification tournament. The RFFFS page for Cambodia shows Cambodia losing 2–3 to Malaya on 17 March and losing 2–9 to Malaya on 24 April, with both matches played in Malaya. The Elo site for Cambodia shows the same results, but with the match on 17 March being played in Cambodia. The RFFFS page for the Asian Cup shows the matches as 9–2 to Malaya on 17 March (played in Malaya) and 3–2 to Cambodia on 24 April (played in Cambodia). As the Elo rankings are based on Cambodia losing both matches, this is assumed to be correct
D.The RSSSF page for Saudi Arabia lists the first match as being played on 20 October 1957 against Syria in the 1957 Pan Arab Games, whereas the RSSSF article on these games lists the first match as being played against the hosts, Lebanon, on 18 October. This is supported by the Elo page for Saudi Arabia.
