= 1974 Chatham Cup =

Tournament details
- Venue(s): Queen Elizabeth II Park, Christchurch
- Dates: 7 September 1974

Final positions
- Champions: Christchurch United (2nd title)
- Runners-up: Wellington Diamond United

The 1974 Chatham Cup was the 47th annual nationwide knockout football competition in New Zealand.

Early stages of the competition were run in three regions, with the National League teams receiving a bye until the later stages of the competition. In all, 114 teams took part in the competition, at that time a record number. Note: Different sources give different numberings for the rounds of the competition: some start round one with the beginning of the regional qualifications; others start numbering from the first national knock-out stage. The former numbering scheme is used in this article.

A change was made in the way tied matches were decided, with penalty shoot-outs introduced in the event of ties after extra time. Replays were still used for the later rounds, with a replay being needed in one semi-final.

== The 1974 final ==
With the exception of replays, 1974 was the first time that the final had been held in the South Island, at Queen Elizabeth II Park, Christchurch. The venue had been used earlier in the year for the Commonwealth Games.

The game was played on a heavily sodden pitch, the result of several days of heavy rain, and thousands of gallons of water had to be removed before the surface was usable. Despite the poor conditions, the game was entertaining, and Christchurch ran out the winners with a late Brian Hardman goal adding to an earlier strike from Ian Park.

== Results ==
=== Third Round ===
AC Otago	0 – 2	North End United (Dunedin)

Cambridge	1 – 7	Hamilton

Christchurch HSOB	2 – 4	Christchurch Technical

Courier Rangers	1 – 3	Manurewa

Ellerslie	3 – 0	East Coast Bays

Gisborne Thistle	0 – 1	Masterton United

Halswell United	1 – 2	Western (Christchurch)

Howick	0 – 4	Eden

Invercargill Thistle	0 – 4	Caversham

Manawatu United	2 – 1	Wanganui City

Metro College (Auckland)	1 – 1 (aet)	Pakuranga Town

Moturoa	4 – 1	Stratford

Mount Albert-Ponsonby	3 – 4	Lynndale (Auckland)

Mount Roskill	1 – 2	Whangarei City

Nelson United	0 – 2	Upper Hutt United

Porirua United	3 – 1	Lower Hutt City

Queens Park (Invercargill)	2 – 0	Roslyn-Wakari

Rotorua City	2 – 0	Whakatane Town

Timaru City	2 – 3	Shamrock (Christchurch)

Wainuiomata	7 – 2	Victoria University

Waterside (Wellington)	1 – 0	Adriatic (Wellington)

Wellington WMC	1 – 0	Hungaria (Wellington)

==== Replay ====
Metro College	0 – 2	Pakuranga Town

=== Fourth Round ===
Christchurch Technical	0 – 4	New Brighton

Christchurch United	5 – 0	Shamrock

Ellerslie	1 – 4	Blockhouse Bay

Gisborne City	2 – 1	Wellington City

Hamilton	1 – 2	Eden

Manawatu United	3 – 3*	Waterside

Masterton United	2 – 3	Upper Hutt United

Moturoa	1 – 2	Porirua United

Mount Wellington	1 – 0	Pakuranga Town

North End United	0 – 2	Western AFC

North Shore United	3 – 1	Manurewa

Queens Park	0 – 2	Caversham

Rotorua City	0 – 3	Eastern Suburbs (Auckland)

Stop Out (Lower Hutt)	6 – 0	Wellington WMC

Wainuiomata	0 – 4	Wellington Diamond United

Whangarei City	5 – 2	Lynndale

* aet. Manawatu won 4–3 on penalties

=== Fifth Round ===
Blockhouse Bay	0 – 1	North Shore United

Caversham	1 – 2	Christchurch United

Gisborne City	3 – 2	Stop Out

Manawatu United	2 – 4	Wellington Diamond United

Mount Wellington	1 – 1 (aet)*	Eastern Suburbs

Porirua United	5 – 0	Upper Hutt United

Western	0 – 2	New Brighton

Whangarei City	4 – 1	Eden

* Eastern Suburbs won 8–7 on penalties

=== Sixth Round ===
Gisborne City	3 – 2 (aet)	Eastern Suburbs

North Shore United	1 – 0	New Brighton

Porirua United	1 – 2 (aet)	Wellington Diamond United

Whangarei City	1 – 3	Christchurch United

=== Semi-finals ===
Christchurch United	2 – 1 (aet)	North Shore United

Wellington Diamond United	0 – 0 (aet)	Gisborne City

?, Wellington

==== Replay ====
Wellington Diamond United	2 – 1	Gisborne City

?, Wellington

=== Final ===
7 September 1974

Christchurch United	2 – 0	Wellington Diamond United
Park, Hardman

Queen Elizabeth II Park, Christchurch
Referee: W.K. Munro
