= 1975 Chatham Cup =

Tournament details
- Venue(s): Newmarket Park, Auckland
- Dates: 13 September 1975

Final positions
- Champions: Christchurch United (3rd title)
- Runners-up: Blockhouse Bay

The 1975 Chatham Cup was the 48th annual nationwide knockout football competition in New Zealand.

Early stages of the competition were run in three regions (northern, central, and southern), with the National League teams receiving a bye until the later stages of the competition. In all, 123 teams took part in the competition. Note: Different sources give different numberings for the rounds of the competition: some start round one with the beginning of the regional qualifications; others start numbering from the first national knock-out stage. The former numbering scheme is used in this article.

One of the highlights of the competition was the performance of unfancied minnows Lower Hutt City, who progressed to the quarter-finals before being narrowly beaten by the competition's eventual winners Christchurch United.

The competition saw a change of sponsorship, with Lion Breweries taking over from Gillette. The competition was known as the Lion Chatham Cup for the rest of the decade.

== The 1975 final ==
Christchurch United successfully defended their trophy, and also became only the second team to win the Chatham Cup/National League double.

Blockhouse Bay were on top early, and looked like they might run away with the final, scoring through Mike Farac and Colin Shaw to lead by two goals after just ten minutes. Norman Moran reduced the deficit within minutes as the mainlanders came back into the match. With ten minutes to play, Gary Lake miscued while attempting to clear a cross into his own penalty area and the ball deflected into his own net to tie the scores.

In extra time it was Christchurch who applied all the pressure, and goals came to them through Kevin Mulgrew and substitute Mark McNaughton.

== Results ==
=== Third Round ===
Cashmere Wanderers	2 – 0	Woolston WMC

Central City (Palmerston N.)	0 – 2	Manawatu United (Palmerston N.)

East Coast Bays	0 – 2	Glenfield Rovers

Eden	0 – 3	Whangarei City

Grey Lynn	3 – 0	Te Atatu

Hamilton	6 – 0	Claudelands Rovers

Karori Swifts	0 – 1	Lower Hutt City

Manurewa	2 – 1	Courier Rangers (Auckland)

Metro College (Auckland)	3 – 0	Takapuna City

Motueka	1 – 5	Porirua United

Naenae	4 – 4	Nelson Suburbs

Napier City Rovers	2 – 1	Masterton United

Nelson United	0 – 1	Waterside (Wellington)

Newlands Paparangi	2 – 2	Petone

Queens Park	3 – 1	Gore Wanderers

Roslyn-Wakari	1 – 2	Dunedin City

Shamrock (Christchurch)	5 – 0	Christchurch Technical

Southland Boys High School	1 – 3	Mosgiel

Tauranga City	0 – 3	Rotorua City

Upper Hutt United	3 – 1	Hungaria

Waitemata City	2 – 0	Birkenhead United

Wellington Diamond United	5 – 0	Stokes Valley

* Won on penalties by Nelson Suburbs (6–5) and Newlands Paparangi (6–5)

=== Fourth Round ===
Caversham	2 – 1	Mosgiel

Christchurch United	2 – 1	New Brighton

Dunedin City	2 – 1	Shamrock

Eastern Suburbs (Auckland)	0 – 4	Blockhouse Bay

Glenfield Rovers	5 – 3	Waitemata City

Hamilton	3 – 2	North Shore United

Lower Hutt City	3 – 1	Waterside

Metro College	1 – 0	Grey Lynn

Mount Wellington	4 – 0	Rotorua City

Napier City Rovers	3 – 2	Manawatu United

Porirua United	3 – 0	Nelson Suburbs

Queens Park	2 – 1	Cashmere Wanderers

Stop Out (Lower Hutt)	3 – 1	Gisborne City

Upper Hutt United	4 – 2	Newlands Paparangi

Wellington City	1 – 4	Wellington Diamond United

Whangarei City	3 – 1	Manurewa

=== Fifth Round ===
Caversham	1 – 3	Christchurch United

Hamilton	2 – 1	Whangarei City

Metro College	1 – 3	Blockhouse Bay

Mount Wellington	3 – 0	Glenfield Rovers

Napier City Rovers	3 – 2	Porirua United

Queens Park	0 – 5	Dunedin City

Stop Out	2 – 2 (aet)*	Wellington Diamond United

Upper Hutt United	1 – 4	Lower Hutt City

* Stop Out won 4–3 on penalties

=== Sixth Round ===
Christchurch United	3 – 2	Lower Hutt City

Dunedin City	1 – 3	Blockhouse Bay

Mount Wellington	2 – 0	Hamilton

Stop Out	4 – 1	Napier City Rovers

=== Semi-finals ===
Christchurch United	3 – 0	Mount Wellington

Stop Out	1 – 3	Blockhouse Bay

=== Final ===
13 September 1975

Christchurch United	4 – 2 (aet)	Blockhouse Bay
Moran, Lake (o.g.), Mulgrew, McNaughton		Farac, Shaw

Newmarket Park, Auckland
Referee: J.W. Cameron
