= 1971 Chatham Cup =

Football competition in New Zealand

Tournament details
- Venue(s): Basin Reserve, Wellington
- Dates: 11 September 1971

Final positions
- Champions: Western Suburbs FC (1st title)
- Runners-up: Wellington City

The 1971 Chatham Cup was the 44th annual nationwide knockout football competition in New Zealand.

Early stages of the competition were run on a regional basis, with the National League teams receiving a bye until the later stages of the competition. In all, 99 teams took part in the competition. Note: Different sources give different numberings for the rounds of the competition: some start round one with the beginning of the regional qualifications; others start numbering from the first national knock-out stage. The former numbering scheme is used in this article.

== The 1971 final ==
Prior to the changes in the organisation of the competition in 1970, finals were always between North Island and South Island teams. With the reorganisation of the draw, this was no longer the case, and so the 1971 final became the first local derby ever to be played out in the final, with both teams coming from Wellington.

In the final, Western Suburbs made up for their defeat the previous year by seeing of neighbours Wellington City, who had been formed as a national league side through a merger of Miramar Rangers and Hungaria. In a howling Wellington southerly wind, Dave Wallace and Allan Jeffrey scored for Suburbs while Paul Cameron and Julius Beck countered for City. With the scores tied, the teams went to extra time, where the game remained locked at 2-2 until the last moments. With the final kick of the game Barry Humphreys sent a long ball forward which caught the breeze and bounced over the City keeper into his net.

== Results ==
=== Third round ===
Birkenhead United	3 – 0	Glenfield Rovers

Canterbury University	1 – 0	Halswell United

Christchurch City	4 – 1	Burndale United (Christchurch)

Christchurch Rangers	4 – 1	Timaru City

Christchurch Technical	3 – 1	Woolston W.M.C.

Christian Youth	3 – 1	Wainuiomata

Dunedin City	3 – 0	Caversham †

Ellerslie	3 – 1	East Coast Bays

Eden (Auckland)	2 – 0	Onehunga-Mangere

Invercargill Thistle	4 – 1	Invercargill United †

Kiwi United (Palmerston North)	1 – 0	Palmerston City (Palmerston North)

Manukau City	2 – 1	Manurewa

Miramar Rangers	1 – 0	Johnson Villa (Wellington)

Moturoa	5 – 1	New Plymouth United

Napier City	3 – 0	Leopard United (Hastings)

New Brighton	6 – 2	Shamrock (Christchurch)

New Plymouth Old Boys	13 – 0	New Plymouth City

North Shore United	5 – 0	Sparta Newmarket

Papakura City	2 – 1	Papatoetoe

Riccarton	1 – 0	Christchurch HSOB

Seatoun	2 – 0	Brooklyn United

Takapuna City	4 – 0	Central (Auckland)

Te Atatu	4 – 4*	Pakuranga Town

Tokoroa	3 – 2	Claudelands Rovers

Waterside (Wellington)	6 – 2	Adriatic (Wellington)

* Te Atatu won on corners

† Due to the regional nature of the early part of the competition, Caversham and Invercargill United both progressed to a regional play-off, despite their losses in this round of the competition

=== Fourth round ===
Canterbury University	3 – 1	Riccarton

Christchurch Technical	5 – 1	Christchurch Rangers

Douglas Villa (Masterton)	2 – 1	Masterton United

Ellerslie	4 – 3	Eden

Hamilton	5 – 3	Affco Rangers (Ngaruawahia)

Huntly Thistle	5 – 3	Tokoroa

Invercargill United	3 – 1	Caversham

Kiwi United	7 – 0	Levin United

Miramar Rangers	1 – 0	Christian Youth

Moturoa	1 – 1*	New Plymouth Old Boys

Napier City	2 – 0	Napier Rovers

New Brighton	3 – 2	Christchurch City

North Shore United	3 – 0	Te Atatu

Papakura City	1 – 0	Manukau City

Seatoun	3 – 2	Waterside

Takapuna City	3 – 1	Birkenhead United

Whangarei	2 – 1	Northern United (North Shore)

* Moturoa won on corners

=== Fifth round ===
Christchurch United	5 – 1	Canterbury University

Douglas Villa	1 – 3	Seatoun

Dunedin City	2 – 0	Invercargill United

Gisborne City	3 – 0	Kiwi United

Hamilton	1 – 4	Mount Wellington

Huntly Thistle	2 – 4	Eastern Suburbs (Auckland)

Invercargill Thistle	0 – 6	Dunedin Suburbs

Moturoa	1 – 7	Western Suburbs FC (Porirua)

Napier City	4 – 5	Miramar Rangers

Nelson United	2 – 0	Gisborne Thistle

New Brighton	3 – 0	Christchurch Technical

North Shore United	2 – 4	Blockhouse Bay

Papakura City	2 – 0	Ellerslie

Stop Out (Lower Hutt)	0 – 6	Wellington City

Whangarei	0 – 1	Takapuna City

=== Sixth Round ===
Dunedin Suburbs	3 – 1	Dunedin City

Eastern Suburbs	2 – 3	Blockhouse Bay

Miramar Rangers	4 – 4 (aet)*	Gisborne City

Mount Albert-Ponsonby	0 – 3	Mount Wellington

Nelson United	1 – 3	Western Suburbs FC

New Brighton	2 – 1	Christchurch United

Seatoun	0 – 2	Wellington City

Takapuna City	2 – 0	Papakura City

* Miramar Rangers won on corners.

=== Quarter-finals ===
Blockhouse Bay	0 – 1	Mount Wellington

Miramar Rangers	0 – 2	Wellington City

New Brighton	2 – 3	Western Suburbs FC

Takapuna City	1 – 3	Dunedin Suburbs

=== Semi-finals ===
Mount Wellington	0 – 1	Wellington City

Western Suburbs FC	2 – 0 (aet)	Dunedin Suburbs

=== Final ===
11 September 1971

Western Suburbs FC	3 – 2 (aet)	Wellington City
Wallace, Jeffery, Humphreys		Cameron, Beck

Basin Reserve, Wellington
Referee: E. Saker
