= List of first association football internationals per country =

The first official international association football matches for each (present or past) member of FIFA are listed chronologically as follows:

- List of first association football internationals per country: 1872–1940
- List of first association football internationals per country: 1940–1962
- List of first association football internationals per country: 1962–present
