= 1953 Chatham Cup =

Tournament details
- Venue(s): Basin Reserve, Wellington
- Dates: 5 September 1953

Final positions
- Champions: Eastern Suburbs (2nd title)
- Runners-up: Northern

The 1953 Chatham Cup was the 26th annual nationwide knockout football competition in New Zealand.

The competition was run on a regional basis, with regional associations each holding separate qualifying rounds.

Teams taking part are known to have included; Eastern Suburbs, Mount Albert Grammar Old Boys, Auckland Thistle, Grey Lynn Comrades, Auckland University, Point Chevalier, Auckland Training College, Royal New Zealand Navy, Eden, Ellerslie, North Shore United, Ōtāhuhu, Onehunga, Ponsonby (Auckland), Mangakino, Huntly Thistle (Waikato), Eastern Union (Gisborne), New Plymouth City, New Plymouth Overseas, New Plymouth Old Boys (Taranaki), Napier Rovers (Hawkes Bay), Wanganui New Settlers, St. Andrews, Palmerston North United, Waiouru (Wanganui/Manawatu), Victoria University, Miramar Rangers, Trentham Athletic, Stop Out, Institute Old Boys, Swifts, Diamond, Northern, Apollon, Waterside, Johnsonvilla, Upper Hutt United, Hospital, Seatoun, Petone, Railways, Wellington Marist, (Wellington), Millerton Thistle (Buller), Woodbourne (Marlborough), Saint Vincent, Atlantis, Wigram, Christchurch Technical Old Boys, Hinemoa, University of Canterbury, Nomads, Christchurch City, Shamrock, Western, Christchurch Thistle (Canterbury), Mornington, Dunedin Technical, Caversham, Green Island, Maori Hill, Northern, Roslyn-Wakari, Otago High School Old Boys (Dunedin), and Invercargill Thistle.

== The 1953 final ==
The final was a repeat of the 1951 final, with Eastern Suburbs again beating Dunedin's Northern. Reg King added two further goals to his three from 1951, equalling the aggregate record of five finals goals. The game was a thrilling one according to contemporary accounts, with Northern letting in a soft goal very early on and the game opening up with frequent chances at both ends. Suburbs clinched the match with the winning goal late on in the second half. Scorers were Reg King (2), Ken Fleet, and Murray Anderson for Eastern Suburbs, while Trevor McFarlane gained a brace for Northern and Bill Boardman also scored for the Dunedin side.

== Results ==
=== Quarter-Finals ===
North Island Semi-Final
1 August 1953

Eastern Suburbs	3–1	Huntly Thistle

Blandford Park, Auckland
North Island Semi-Final
1 August 1953

Seatoun	5–0	Wanganui New Settlers

Basin Reserve, Wellington
South Island Semi-Final
8 August 1953

Christchurch Thistle	4–2	Millerton Thistle

English Park, Christchurch
South Island Semi-Final
1 August 1953

Invercargill Thistle	1–8	Northern

Invercargill Showgrounds, Invercargill

=== Semi-Finals ===
North Island Final
15 August 1953

Eastern Suburbs	1–0	Seatoun

Blandford Park, Auckland
South Island Final
22 August 1953

Northern	3–0	Christchurch Thistle

Caledonian Park, Dunedin

=== Final ===
1953 Chatham Cup Final
5 September 1953

Eastern Suburbs	4–3	Northern
King 2, Fleet, M. Anderson		McFarlane 2, Boardman

Basin Reserve, Wellington
Referee: J.K. Wellwood
