= George McLaren =

George McLaren may refer to:

- George McLaren (American football) (1896–1967), American football player and coach
- George McLaren (Australian footballer) (1925–1956), Australian rules footballer
- George McLaren (New Zealand footballer), former New Zealand international football (soccer) player
- George McLaren (born 1997), English actor
