= List of first association football internationals per country: 1872–1940 =

The following is a list of first official international association football matches for each (present or past) member of FIFA, played up to the end of 1939. The matches are listed chronologically.

== Scotland and England ==
30 November 1872 Friendly	Scotland	0–0	England	Hamilton Crescent, Partick
				Attendance: 4,000; Referee: Willy Keay (Scotland)

First official international football match.

== Wales ==
25 March 1876 Friendly	Scotland	4–0	Wales	Hamilton Crescent, Partick
	Ferguson 40'; Lang 48'; MacKinnon 53'; H. McNeil 70'			Attendance: 17,000; Referee: Robert W. Gardner (Scotland)

== Ireland (Northern Ireland) ==
18 February 1882 Friendly	Ireland	0–13	England	Bloomfield, Belfast
			Vaughton 3' (?); A. Brown 8' (?); J. Brown 15' (?); Cursham (?); C. Bambridge (?)	Attendance: 2,500; Referee: Robert M Kennedy (Ireland)

== Uruguay and Argentina ==
20 July 1902 Friendly	Uruguay	0–6	Argentina	Estadio Paso del Molino, Montevideo
			Dickinson 3'; Arimalo 31' (o.g.); Morgan 64'; Carve 66' (o.g.); Anderson 71'; J. Brown 86'	Attendance: 8,000; Referee: Roberto W. Ruud (Argentina)

First official international match played outside the British Isles.

== Austria and Hungary ==
12 October 1902 Friendly	Austria	5–0	Hungary	Wiener A.C. Platz, Vienna
	Taurer 5'; Studnicka 10' (?); Huber 34'			Attendance: 500; Referee: Roland Shires (England)

First official international match played in continental Europe.

== Bohemia (Czech Republic) ==
5 April 1903 Friendly	Hungary	2–1	Bohemia	Millenáris Sporttelep, Budapest
	Borbás 16'; Minder 78'		Rezek 9'	Attendance: 750; Referee: Béla Ordódy (Hungary)

== Belgium and France ==
1 May 1904 Évence Coppée Trophy	Belgium	3–3	France	Stade du Vivier d'Oie, Brussels
	Quéritet 7', 50'; Destrebecq 65'		Mesnier 12'; Royet 13'; Cypres 87'	Attendance: 1,500; Referee: John C. Keene (England)

== Switzerland ==
12 February 1905 Friendly	France	1–0	Switzerland	Parc des Princes, Paris
	Cypres 60'			Attendance: 500; Referee: John Lewis (England)

== Netherlands ==
30 April 1905 Friendly	Belgium	1–4	Netherlands	Beerschot A.C. Stadion, Antwerp
	Stom 66' (o.g.)		de Neve 87', 106', 117', 119'	Attendance: 800; Referee: Frank König (Belgium)

== Guyana and Trinidad and Tobago ==
21 July 1905 Friendly	British Guiana	1–4	Trinidad and Tobago	British Guiana
	Not known (?)		Not known (?)

== Germany ==
5 April 1908 Friendly	Switzerland	5–3	Germany	Stadion Landhof, Basel
	Kämpfer 21', 89'; Jordan 28' (o.g.); Pfeiffer 32', 57'		Becker 6', 69'; Förderer 52'	Attendance: 3,500; Referee: H. P. Devitte (Switzerland)

== Sweden and Norway ==
12 July 1908 Friendly	Sweden	11–3	Norway	Balders Hage, Gothenburg
	Gustafsson 14', 79'; Börjesson 24', 60', 75', 86'; Bergström 27', 29', 44', 89'; Lindman 45'		Bøhn 1', 66'; Endrerud 45'	Attendance: 3,000; Referee: Charles Smith (England)

== Denmark ==
19 October 1908 1908 Olympic Games	Denmark	9–0	France B	White City, London
	N. Middelboe 10', 50'; Wolfhagen 15', 17', 67', 72'; Bohr 25', 46'; Nielsen 78'			Attendance: 2,000; Referee: Thomas Kyle (England)

== Italy ==
15 May 1910 Friendly	Italy	6–2	France	Arena Civica, Milan
	Lana 13', 59', 89'; Fossati 20'; Rizzi 66'; Debernardi 82'		Bellocq 49'; Ducret 62'	Attendance: 4,000; Referee: Henry Goodley (England)

== Chile ==
27 May 1910 Friendly	Argentina	3–1	Chile	Belgrano, Buenos Aires
	Viale 38'; Susán 43'; Hayes 68'		Simmons 11'	Attendance: 6,200; Referee: Arnaldo Bergalli

== Finland ==
22 October 1911 Friendly	Finland (Russian Empire)	2–5	Sweden	Eläintarha Stadium, Helsinki
	Lindbäck 3'; Jerima 5'		Ericsson 40'; Persson 46'; Brolin 65', 86'; Andersson 88'	Attendance: 1,000; Referee: Arve Eerikäinen (Finland)

== Luxembourg ==
29 October 1911 Friendly	Luxembourg	1–4	France	Stade Racing Club, Lëtzebuerg
	Elter 15'		Vialmonteil 26'; Mesnier 32', 80'; Gravier 84'	Attendance: 2,400; Referee: Raphael Van Praag (Belgium)

== Russia ==
30 June 1912 1912 Olympic Games	Finland (Russian Empire)	2–1	Russia	Tranebergs Idrottsplats, Stockholm
	Wiberg 30'; Öhman 80'		Butusov 71'	Attendance: 200; Referee: Per Sjöblom (Sweden)

== Philippines and China ==
1 February 1913 1913 Far Eastern Games	Philippines	2–1	China	Carnival Grounds, Manila
	Not known (?)		Not known (?)

== Brazil ==
20 September 1914 Friendly	Argentina	3–0	Brazil	Gimnasia, Buenos Aires
	Izaguirre 41', 65'; Molfino 57'			Attendance: 18,000; Referee: Leon Peyrou

== United States ==
20 August 1916 Friendly	Sweden	2–3	United States	Stockholms Stadion, Stockholm
	Törnqvist 7', 81'		Spalding 22'; Ellis 53'; Cooper 68'	Attendance: 15,000; Referee: Hagbard Vestergaard (Denmark)

== Japan ==
9 May 1917 1917 Far Eastern Games	Japan	0–5	China	Tokyo
			Not known (?)

== Paraguay ==
11 May 1919 Friendly	Paraguay	1–5	Argentina	Estadio de Puerto Sajonia, Asunción
	Talavera (?)		Polimeni 7'; Laguna 52', 58'; Ochandio 75', 87'	Attendance: 4,000; Referee: German Guassone (Argentina)

== Spain ==
28 August 1920 1920 Olympic Games	Denmark	0–1	Spain	La Butte, Brussels
			Patricio 54'	Attendance: 2,000; Referee: Willem Eymers (Netherlands)

== Czechoslovakia and Yugoslavia ==
28 August 1920 1920 Olympic Games	Czechoslovakia	7–0	Yugoslavia	Bosuilstadion, Antwerp
	Vanik 20', 46', 79'; Janda 34', 50', 75'; Sedláček 43'			Attendance: 600; Referee: Raphael Van Praag (Belgium)

== Egypt ==
28 August 1920 1920 Olympic Games	Italy	2–1	Egypt	Jules Ottenstadion, Ghent
	Baloncieri 25'; Brezzi 57'	Report	Osman 30'	Attendance: 2,000; Referee: Paul Putz (Belgium)

== Estonia ==
17 October 1920 Friendly	Finland	6–0	Estonia	Töölön Pallokenttä, Helsinki
	Öhman 5'; Eklöf 10', 80'; Österholm 15'; Tanner 35', 70'			Attendance: 2,000; Referee: Kaarlo Soinio (Finland)

== Suriname ==
28 January 1921 Friendly	Dutch Guiana (Netherlands)	1–2	British Guiana	Dutch Guiana
	Not known (?)		Not known (?)

== Costa Rica and El Salvador ==
14 September 1921 Independence Centenary Games	Costa Rica	7–0	El Salvador	Guatemala City
	Not known (?)

== Guatemala and Honduras ==
14 September 1921 Independence Centenary Games	Guatemala	10–1	Honduras	Guatemala City
	Not known (?); Not known (?)		Not known (?)

== Poland ==
18 December 1921 Friendly	Hungary	1–0	Poland	Hungária Körút, Budapest
	Szabó 18'			Attendance: 8,000; Referee: Emil Grätz (Czechoslovakia)

== Portugal ==
18 December 1921 Friendly	Spain	3–1	Portugal	Campo de O'Donnell, Madrid
	Meana 20'; Alcántara 23', 50'		Augusto 75'	Attendance: 14,000; Referee: Charles Barette (Belgium)

== Romania ==
8 June 1922 1922 King Alexander's Cup	Yugoslavia	1–2	Romania	Stadion Jugoslavija, Belgrade
	Šifer 35'		Rónnay 41'; Guga 61'	Attendance: 5,000; Referee: Heinrich Retschury (Austria)

== New Zealand and Australia ==
17 June 1922 Friendly	New Zealand	3–1	Australia	Carisbrook, Dunedin
	Cook (?); Knott (?)		Maunder (?)	Attendance: 8,000; Referee: M. Thornley

== Latvia ==
24 September 1922 Friendly	Latvia	1–1	Finland	A.S.K. Stadion, Riga
	Bārda 2'		Üpraus 88'	Attendance: 3,000; Referee: Verner Eklöf (Finland)

== Mexico ==
1 January 1923 Friendly	Guatemala	2–3	Mexico	Estadio Marte, Guatemala City
	Minondo 65'; Kinhie 72'		Díaz 25'; Horacio Ortiz 40'; López 70'	Attendance: 10,000; Referee: José James

== Lithuania ==
24 June 1923 Friendly	Lithuania	0–5	Estonia	L.F.L.S. Stadionas, Kaunas
			Tell 1', 62', 79'; Ellman-Eelma 40'; Paal 64'	Attendance: 3,000; Referee: Adolf Hahne (Latvia)

== Turkey ==
26 October 1923 Friendly	Turkey	2–2	Romania	Taksim Stadium, Istanbul
	Sporel 32', 50'		Gansl 20', 53'	Attendance: 7,500; Referee: Anton Krátký (Czechoslovakia)

== Aruba and Curaçao ==
6 April 1924 Friendly	Aruba (Netherlands)	0–4	(Netherlands) Curaçao	Aruba
			Not known (?)

== Bulgaria ==
21 May 1924 Friendly	Austria	6–0	Bulgaria	Simmeringer Sportplatz, Vienna
	Horvath 31', 48', 49'; Grünwald 45', 49'; Danis 73'			Attendance: 10,000; Referee: Theodor Kiss (Hungary)

== Republic of Ireland ==
28 May 1924 1924 Olympic Games	Irish Free State	1–0	Bulgaria	Stade Olympique de Colombes, Colombes, Paris
	Duncan 75'			Attendance: 1,659; Referee: A. Henriot (France)

== Canada ==
7 June 1924 Friendly	Australia	3–2	Canada	Brisbane
	Not known (?)		Not known (?)

== South Africa ==
24 September 1924 Friendly	Ireland	1–2	South Africa	Solitude, Belfast
	Frank Rushe 10'		D Murray 44'; J Green 75'	Attendance: 6,000; Referee: William Cowan (Ireland)

== Soviet Union ==
16 November 1924 Friendly	Soviet Union	3–0	Turkey	Stadion Imeni Vorovskogo, Moscow
	Butusov 14', 25'; Shpakovsky 70'			Attendance: 15,000; Referee: Hamdi Emin Çap (Turkey)

== Haiti and Jamaica ==
22 March 1925 Friendly	Haiti	1–2	Jamaica	Haiti
	Not known (?)		Not known (?)

== Kenya and Uganda ==
1 May 1926 Gossage Cup	Kenya	1–1	Uganda	Nairobi
	Not known (?)		Not known (?)

== Bolivia ==
12 October 1926 1926 South American Championship	Chile	7–1	Bolivia	Estadio Sport de Ñuñoa, Santiago
	Ramírez 10'; Subiabre 14'; Arellano 15', 41', 80', 84'; Moreno 47'		Aguilar 89'	Attendance: 12,000; Referee: Norberto Luis Gallieri (Argentina)

== Peru ==
11 November 1927 1927 South American Championship	Peru	0–4	Uruguay	Estadio Nacional, Lima
			Ulloa 49' (o.g.); Sacco 52', 71'; Castro 75'	Attendance: 22,000; Referee: Consolato Nay Foino (Argentina)

== Tunisia ==
1928 Friendly	Tunisia	2–3	France "B"	Stade Municipal de Gabès, Gabès
	Not known (?)		Not known (?)

== Greece ==
7 April 1929 Friendly	Greece	1–4	Italy "B"	Leoforos Alexandras Stadium, Athens
	Nahmias 60'		Volk 35', 65'; Busini 68'; Tansini 80'	Attendance: 15,000; Referee: Ferenc Kann (Hungary)

== Nicaragua ==
1 May 1929 Friendly	El Salvador	0–9	Nicaragua	El Salvador
			Not known (?); Not known (?)

== Cuba ==
16 March 1930 1930 Central American and Caribbean Games	Cuba	3–1	Jamaica	Havana
	Not known (?)		Not known (?)

== Barbados and Martinique ==
9 February 1931 Friendly	Barbados	1–2	Martinique	Barbados
	Not known (?)		Not known (?)

== Israel ==
16 March 1934 1934 World Cup qualifier	Egypt	7–1	Mandatory Palestine	British Army Ground, Cairo
	El-Tetsh 11', 35', 51'; Taha 21', 79'; Latif 43', 87'		Nudelmann 61'	Attendance: 13,000; Referee: Stanley Wells (England)

== Indonesia ==
13 May 1934 1934 Far Eastern Games	Japan	1–7	Dutch East Indies	Rizal Memorial Stadium, Manila
	Kawamoto (?)		(?) Jahn (?) Hong Djien (?) Hian Goa

== Panama ==
28 July 1937 Friendly	Panama	2–2	Mexico	Cali, Colombia
	Not known (?)		Not known (?)

== Colombia ==
10 February 1938 1938 Central American and Caribbean Games	Mexico	3–1	Colombia	Nacional, Panama City
	Argüelles 40' de la Fuente 78'; Casarín 83'		Mejía 3'	Attendance: 20,000; Referee: Rafael Mirabal

== Venezuela ==
12 February 1938 1938 Central American and Caribbean Games	Panama	3–1	Venezuela	Panama City
	Not known (?)		Not known (?)

== Ecuador ==
8 August 1938 1938 Bolivarian Games	Bolivia	1–1	Ecuador	Bogotá, Colombia
	Not known (?)		Not known (?)

== India ==
3 September 1938 Friendly	Australia	5–3	India	Sydney, Australia
	Quill (?); J. Hughes (?); J. Wilkinson (?)	Report	A. Rahim (?); Lumsden (?); Bhattacharya (?)	Stadium: Sydney Showground; Attendance: 16,144

== Slovakia ==
27 August 1939 Friendly	Slovakia	2–0	Germany	Stadion Slovana, Bratislava
	Arpáš 20'; Luknár 35'			Attendance: 17,000; Referee: Mika Popović (Yugoslavia)

== See also ==
- List of first association football internationals per country: 1940–1962
- List of first association football internationals per country: since 1962

== Notes ==
A.A match between Uruguay and Argentina had been organized on 16 May 1901. Uruguay's team (and the match itself) was organized by Uruguayan club Albion and reinforced with players from rival club Nacional. The match ended 2–3 in favor of the Argentines. However, since clubs are not allowed to organize official international matches, the match is not considered official.
B.Some sources credit the own goal to Peet Stol.
C. China were represented by club side South China A.A.; this match is not considered an official match for China.
D. Japan were represented by a team from Tokyo Higher Normal School; this match is considered an official match for Japan.
E. China were represented by club side South China A.A.; this match is not considered an official match for China.
F. Canadian representative sides played against the United States in 1885–86 and again in 1904; these are not considered to be official internationals. See the Canada International soccer team article for a detailed explanation.
G.Some sources credit the own goal to Roberto Figueroa of Uruguay.
