= Ian Marshall =

Ian Marshall or Iain Marshall may refer to:

- Ian Marshall (English footballer) (born 1966)
- Ian Marshall (football manager) (1942–2003), New Zealand Football coach
- Ian Marshall (politician), Northern Ireland farmer and politician
- Iain Marshall, New Zealand footballer
- Ian Howard Marshall (1934–2015), Scottish New Testament scholar
- Iain Marshall, supposed inventor of the Manhattan (cocktail)
