= Gwyn Evans (footballer) =

Welsh footballer

Personal information
- Date of birth: 24 December 1935
- Place of birth: Ton Pentre, Wales
- Date of death: 11 May 2000 (aged 64)
- Place of death: New Zealand
- Position: Centre half

Youth career
- Cwm Parc

Senior career*
Years	Team	Apps	(Gls)
1955–1963	Crystal Palace	80	(0)
1963–?	Christchurch United	?	(?)
?	Nelson United	?	(?)
- * Club domestic league appearances and goals

Gwyn Evans (24 December 1935 – 11 May 2000) was a Welsh professional footballer who made 80 Football League appearances for Crystal Palace as a centre-half. He also played for Christchurch United and Nelson United in New Zealand. He was the father of Ceri Evans who also had a career in professional football.

== Playing career ==
Evans was born in Ton Pentre and signed for Crystal Palace, from local club Cwm Parc, in May 1955, but did not make his debut until April 1959, in an away 2–0 defeat to Coventry City. Between then and 1963, Evans made 80 League appearances for Palace, all at centre-half, and made 25 appearances in season 1960–1961 when Palace achieved promotion from the Fourth Division.

However, by the 1962–63 season, Evans was no longer a regular in the side and in 1963, emigrated to New Zealand, signing for Christchurch United (then known as Christchurch City prior to amalgamation with other local clubs). He served Christchurch both as captain and player-coach, leading the club to the final of the Chatham Cup in 1967. He later moved to Nelson United where he continued as player-coach. Whilst in New Zealand, Evans also worked part-time as a teacher.

== Later career ==
After retiring as a player, Evans moved into the administrative side of the game. He served as secretary-general of the New Zealand Football Association, a position he held from 1981 to 1987. He retired on health grounds and moved to Waiheke Island where he ran a shop. In his later years his health declined further and his legs were amputated.

== Personal life ==
Evans was married twice. Firstly to Joyce (née Williamson) a New Zealand table tennis player and secondly to Eleanor. He had three children, including Ceri who played professionally for Oxford United and for the New Zealand national team.

Evans showed ability at several sports and was a British amateur snooker champion. He died on 11 May 2000, and his ashes were buried at Onetangi Cemetery on Waiheke Island.
