= Ceri Evans =

New Zealand footballer

Personal information
- Full name: Ceri L. Evans
- Date of birth: 2 October 1963 (age 63)
- Place of birth: Christchurch, New Zealand
- Height: 6 ft 1 in (1.85 m)
- Position: Defender

Senior career*
Years	Team	Apps	(Gls)
1979–1981	Nelson United	29	(6)
1981	Wellington Diamond United	11	(1)
1982	Christchurch United	21	(2)
1983	Dunedin City	21	(2)
1984–1987	Christchurch United	91	(5)
1988	Otago University AFC		
1989–1994	Oxford United	116	(3)
1994–1995	Marlow	?	(1)
1995–1996	Aberystwyth Town	2	(0)

International career
1980–1993	New Zealand	56	(2)
- * Club domestic league appearances and goals

Ceri Evans (born 2 October 1963 in Christchurch, New Zealand) is a New Zealand former association football player who frequently represented his country as a central defender in the 1980s and 1990s.

After graduating in medicine with distinction from the University of Otago, Evans attended Oxford University as a Rhodes scholar, gaining a first class honours in Experimental Psychology while playing football for Oxford United. He is the son of Gwyn Evans who played professionally for Crystal Palace, for Christchurch United and Nelson United in New Zealand and who also became a senior official in the New Zealand Football Association.

Evans's interest in traumatic memory saw him interview over 100 violent offenders to gain his PhD. He was awarded the Gaskell Gold Medal by the Royal College of Psychiatrists and specialised in forensic psychiatry.

After returning home to Christchurch, Evans served as Clinical Director of the Canterbury Regional Forensic Psychiatry Service, led national projects on violence risk assessment and prison mental health screening and served as an expert witness in leading civil and criminal cases.

Evans has been invited into leading organisations across the spectrum to support their drive for excellence in demanding, high-stakes environments. His Red-Blue mind model is used by people serious about performing under pressure, from doctors to lawyers, from executive teams to special teams, and from professionals to amateurs. He is perhaps best known for his work with the New Zealand All Blacks for whom he has provided specialist consultancy since 2010.

In 2018 Evans was made a Fellow of the Royal College of Psychiatrists and awarded his football coaching A licence.

His book Perform Under Pressure was published in 2019.

== International career ==
Evans made his full All Whites debut in a 5–1 win over Kuwait on 16 October 1980 and ended his international playing career with 56 A-international caps and 2 goals to his credit, his final cap coming in a 0–3 loss to Australia on 6 June 1993.

== Professional career ==
- MBChB MA MSc Dip ForMH MRCPsych PhD.: University of Otago MBChB;
- University of Oxford MA (Experimental Psychology);
- Fellow of Royal College of Psychiatrists (and Gaskell Gold Medal winner);
- Career in forensic psychiatry;
- Founder of 'Gazing', a motivational psychology consultancy

== Honours ==
Individual

- New Zealand Footballer of the Year: 1987
