= Don Finlayson =

New Zealand footballer

Personal information
- Full name: Donald C Finlayson
- Date of birth: 18 March 1961 (age 65)
- Place of birth: Auckland, New Zealand
- Position: Goalkeeper

Senior career*
Years	Team	Apps	(Gls)
1979	Blockhouse Bay		
1980–1984	Gisborne City		
1985–1992	Wellington Diamond United		
1993	Napier City Rovers		

International career
1988	New Zealand	1	(0)
- * Club domestic league appearances and goals

Donald Finlayson is a former association football goalkeeper who represented New Zealand at international level.

Finlayson made a solitary official A-international appearance for New Zealand, coming on as a second-half substitute in a 3–2 win over Saudi Arabia on 23 June 1988. He appeared in a number of unofficial matches for New Zealand against club and representative sides, notably at the Kings Cup in Thailand where he played two matches, against Rotor Volgograd and Yukong Elephants.
