= Bill Knott =

Bill or William Knott may refer to:

- Bill Knott (politician) (1921–2013), Australian politician
- Bill Knott (poet) (1940–2014), American poet
- Bill Knott (footballer), New Zealand association football (soccer) player
- William V. Knott (1863–1965), Florida state politician
- Billy Knott (born 1992), English footballer
