= Ernie Bridge (footballer) =

New Zealand footballer

Personal information
- Full name: Ernie J Bridge
- Place of birth: New Zealand

Senior career*
Years	Team	Apps	(Gls)
- Poverty Bay Rangers
1939	Eastern Union		

International career
1936	New Zealand	1	(0)
- * Club domestic league appearances and goals

Ernie Bridge is a former association football player who represented New Zealand at international level.

Bridge made a single appearance in an official international for the All Whites in a 1–4 loss to Australia on 18 July 1936.

== Club Career ==
Bridge played for Eastern Union in Gisborne. He was named in an Eastern Union team selected to play Territorials in August 1939, and was identified as a member of the Eastern Union football team in a 1939 team photograph held by Tairāwhiti Museum.
