= Terry McCavana =

Northern Irish footballer

Personal information
- Full name: William Terence McCavana
- Date of birth: 24 January 1922
- Place of birth: Belfast, Northern Ireland
- Date of death: 16 September 2015 (aged 93)
- Place of death: Auckland, New Zealand
- Height: 6 ft 0 in (1.83 m)
- Position: Defender

Senior career*
Years	Team	Apps	(Gls)
1947–1948	Coleraine	24	(0)
1948–1949	Notts County	3	(0)
1949–1960	Coleraine	257	(5)
- Eastern Union
Total		284	(5)

International career
1954–1955	Northern Ireland	3	(0)
- * Club domestic league appearances and goals

William Terence McCavana (24 January 1922 – 16 September 2015) was a Northern Irish footballer who played as a defender.

== Career ==
Born in Belfast, McCavana began his career as an amateur for Coleraine. He left in 1948 when he moved to England with the RAF, signing for Notts County where he made three league appearances. He returned to Coleraine after a year, staying there for twelve seasons before moving to New Zealand in 1960 to play for Eastern Union. He spent the rest of his life in New Zealand with his wife and five children, and "he played an active role in attempting to establish football in the country throughout the 1960s and 70s."

He also earned three caps for the Northern Ireland national team.
