= Jeff Strom =

New Zealand footballer

Personal information
- Full name: Jeffrey W Strom
- Place of birth: New Zealand

Senior career*
Years	Team	Apps	(Gls)
- Wellington Diamond United

International career
1980–1983	New Zealand	14	(0)
- * Club domestic league appearances and goals

Jeff Strom is a footballer who represented New Zealand at international level.

Strom made his full All Whites debut in a 5–1 win over Kuwait on 16 October 1980 and ended his international playing career with 14 A-international caps to his credit, his final cap an appearance in a 1–1 draw with Sudan on 9 June 1983.
