= Garry Paddison =

New Zealand footballer

Gary Paddison
Personal information
- Full name: Gary L Paddison
- Place of birth: New Zealand
- Height: 6 ft 0 in (1.83 m)
- Position: Striker

Senior career*
Years	Team	Apps	(Gls)
- Blockhouse Bay
- Wellington Diamond United
- Western Suburbs FC
- Stop Out

International career
1975/1979	New Zealand	1 National appearances = 4	(0)
- * Club domestic league appearances and goals

Gary Paddison is a former football (soccer) player who represented New Zealand at international level.

Paddison made 4 appearances and a solitary official international starting appearance for New Zealand in a 1–1 draw with Macao on 5 November 1975. Also made 3 other appearances as substitutes in Wuhan and Jakarta on the 1975 tour as well as against Norwich for NZ in 1979 in Auckland. On the reserves (of 13) in 3 other matches. Represented NZ, NZ Under 21's, Wellington and Auckland 1972 Central League top goalscorer 1975 National league top goalscorer 1973 Top goalscorer (5 goals) NZ Under 21 tour of NZ
