= Garry Welch =

New Zealand footballer

Personal information
- Full name: Garry William Welch
- Date of birth: 20 July 1955 (age 71)
- Place of birth: Hayes, UK, New Zealand
- Height: 5 ft 8 in (1.73 m)
- Position: Winger

Senior career*
Years	Team	Apps	(Gls)
- Wellington Diamond United
- Stop Out
- Seatoun

International career
1980	New Zealand	3	(0)
- * Club domestic league appearances and goals

Garry Welch is a former football (soccer) player who had 165 national league appearances for Stop Out and Wellington Diamond United (that won NZ National League title in 1981) and also represented New Zealand at international level.

Welch played three official full internationals for New Zealand in February 1980, all against Pacific neighbours Fiji, drawing 1–1 in his debut match on 19 February before a 4–0 win and a 0–2 loss on 21 and 27 February 1980 respectively.

He is now a digital health entrepreneur and co-founder of Silver Fern Healthcare (a healthcare SaaS company https://silverfernhealthcare.com/) located in Old Saybrook, Connecticut.
