= Alan Stroud =

New Zealand footballer

Personal information
- Full name: Alan J Stroud
- Date of birth: 11 August 1965 (age 61)
- Place of birth: New Zealand
- Position: Goalkeeper

Senior career*
Years	Team	Apps	(Gls)
- Dunedin City
1991	Christchurch United		
1992	Blacktown City	2	(0)
1993-1995	Christchurch United		

International career^{‡}
1986–1995	New Zealand	3	(0)
- * Club domestic league appearances and goals ‡ National team caps and goals as of Dunedin City

Alan Stroud (born 1965) is a former football (soccer) goalkeeper who represented New Zealand at international level.

He made two appearances for Blacktown City in the 1992 NSW Super League season.. He re-joined Christchurch United in 1993.

Stroud played three official A-international matches for New Zealand between 1986 and 1995, the first two against Fiji, a 2–1 win on 19 September 1986, and a 0–1 loss two years later on a 2–1 win on 19 November 1988. Generally second or third choice keeper for the national side, Stroud did not earn his third full international start until seven years later, a 2–3 loss to Paraguay on 22 June 1995.
