= Bill Harris (New Zealand footballer) =

New Zealand footballer

Personal information
- Full name: R William Harris
- Place of birth: New Zealand

Senior career*
| Years | Team | Apps | (Gls) |
| 1980 | Wellington Diamond United | | |
| 1984–1987 | Wellington United | | |

International career
| 1980 | New Zealand | 6 | (0) |
- * Club domestic league appearances and goals

William Harris is an association football player who represented New Zealand at international level.

Harris made his full All Whites debut as a substitute in a 2–1 win over South Korea on 19 October 1980 and ended his international playing career with 6 A-international caps to his credit, his final cap an appearance in a 0–2 loss to Malaysia on 30 October 1980.
