= David Wallace (footballer) =

New Zealand footballer

Dave Wallace
Personal information
- Full name: David Ronaldson Wallace
- Place of birth: New Zealand
- Date of death: 13 December 2023 (aged 83)
- Place of death: Wellington, New Zealand
- Position: Defender

Senior career*
| Years | Team | Apps | (Gls) |
| 1957–1971 | Western Suburbs | | |

International career
| 1962–1968 | New Zealand | 5 | (0) |
- * Club domestic league appearances and goals

David Ronaldson Wallace was a football (soccer) player who represented New Zealand at international level.

== Club career ==
Wallace played all his senior football for Western Suburbs. He made his debut in 1957 at the age of 16. He went on to win the Central League and Chatham Cup for Western Suburbs before retiring in 1971.

== International career ==
Wallace made his full All Whites debut in a 4–1 win over New Caledonia on 4 June 1962 and ended his international playing career with five A-international caps to his credit, his final cap an appearance in a 1–3 loss to New Caledonia on 8 October 1968. For his final two appearances for New Zealand, Wallace was named captain of the side.

== Honours ==
Western Suburbs

- Central League: 1968
- Chatham Cup: 1971

Individual

- New Zealand Footballer of the Year: 1968
- Arcus Trophy (Note: For the best and fairest player in the Central League.): 1967, 1968
