= Brian Strutt =

Maltese footballer

Personal information
- Full name: Brian John Strutt
- Date of birth: 21 September 1959
- Place of birth: Valletta, Malta
- Date of death: 19 March 2023 (aged 63)
- Place of death: Kawerau, New Zealand
- Position: Striker

Youth career
- Sheffield Wednesday

Senior career*
Years	Team	Apps	(Gls)
1979–1980	Sheffield Wednesday	2	(0)
- Matlock Town
- Gisborne City
- * Club domestic league appearances and goals

Brian John Strutt (21 September 1959 – 19 March 2023) was a Maltese professional footballer who played as a striker.

== Career ==
Born in Valletta, Strutt made two appearances in the Football League for Sheffield Wednesday in the 1979–80 season.

He later played non-league football for Matlock Town, before playing in New Zealand for Gisborne City, where he scored in the final of the 1987 Chatham Cup.

He died on 19 March 2023, in Kawerau, having previously worked as a retail manager.
