= Allan Carville =

New Zealand footballer

Personal information
- Full name: Allan Carville
- Place of birth: New Zealand
- Position: Forward

Senior career*
Years	Team	Apps	(Gls)
ante 1988–?	Christchurch United		
?–1993	Rangers AFC	6	(3)
1995	Woolston WMC	7	(2)
1997	Christchurch Technical		
1998	Rangers AFC	17	(8)
2001	Nomads United	?	(1)

International career
1988–1991	New Zealand	4	(0)
- * Club domestic league appearances and goals

Allan Carville is a former association football player who represented New Zealand at international level.

Carville made his full All Whites debut in a 1–1 draw with Fiji on 14 November 1988 and ended his international playing career with four A-international caps to his credit, his final cap an appearance in a 0–1 loss to Australia on 12 May 1991.
