= Ray McCoy (footballer) =

Northern Ireland footballer

Personal information
- Date of birth: 22 March 1964 (age 62)
- Place of birth: Cookstown, Northern Ireland
- Position: Winger

Youth career
- Cookstown United
- 1977–1980: Coleraine

Senior career*
Years	Team	Apps	(Gls)
1980–1990	Coleraine	185	(77)
1990	Gisborne City		
1990–1998	Glenavon	148	(33)
1997–1998	Dundalk	13	(1)
1998–1999	Bangor	26	(0)
Total		372	(111)

International career
1987	Northern Ireland	1	(0)
- * Club domestic league appearances and goals

Raymond K. McCoy (born 22 March 1964) is a Northern Irish former footballer who played at both semi-professional and international levels as a winger.

== Career ==
=== Club career ===
Born in Cookstown, McCoy played youth-football with Cookstown United, before playing senior football with Coleraine, Gisborne City, Glenavon, Dundalk and Bangor. He was named the Ulster Footballer of the Year for the 1986–87 season.

=== International career ===
McCoy made one appearance for the Northern Ireland senior team in 1987.
