= Don Kendrick =

New Zealand footballer

Personal information
- Full name: Donald F B Kendrick
- Place of birth: New Zealand

Senior career*
Years	Team	Apps	(Gls)
- Eastern Suburbs

International career
1952	New Zealand	5	(4)
- * Club domestic league appearances and goals

Don Kendrick is a former association football player who represented New Zealand at international level.

Kendrick made his full All Whites debut in a 2–0 win over Fiji on 7 September 1952 and ended his international playing career with five A-international caps and four goals to his credit, his final cap an appearance in a 5–3 win over Tahiti on 28 September 1952.
