= Paul Nixon (footballer) =

New Zealand footballer

Personal information
- Full name: Paul Nixon
- Date of birth: 23 September 1963 (age 63)
- Place of birth: Sunderland, England
- Position: Striker

Senior career*
Years	Team	Apps	(Gls)
1981–1987	Seaham Red Star		
1987–1989	Gisborne City		
1989–1991	Bristol Rovers	44	(6)
1991–1993	Eastern AA		
1993–1994	Gisborne City		
1994–1995	Eastern AA		
1995	Waikato United	7	(1)
1997	Melville United		

International career
1988–1997	New Zealand	4	(0)
- * Club domestic league appearances and goals

Paul Nixon (born 23 September 1963) is British-born New Zealand educator and former professional footballer who played for Bristol Rovers and represented New Zealand at international level.

== International career ==
Nixon made his All Whites debut as a substitute in a 1–0 win over Taiwan on 6 March 1988 and he ended his international playing career with 4 A-international caps to his credit, his final cap in a 0–1 loss to Saudi Arabia on 24 April 1993. He went on to coach Melville United and the women's team Claudeland Rovers.

== Honours ==
Bristol Rovers

- Football League Third Division: 1989–90
- Associate Members' Cup runner-up: 1989–90
