= Ray Mears (footballer) =

New Zealand footballer

Personal information
- Full name: Raymond Mears
- Place of birth: Wigan, England

Senior career*
Years	Team	Apps	(Gls)
- Eastern Suburbs

International career
1967–1969	New Zealand	10	(3)
- * Club domestic league appearances and goals

Raymond Mears is a former association football player who represented New Zealand at international level.

Mears scored on his full All Whites debut in a 3–5 loss to Australia on 25 November 1967 and ended his international playing career with 10 A-international caps and 3 goals to his credit, his final cap an appearance in a 0–2 loss to Israel on 1 October 1969.
