= Graham Griffiths =

New Zealand footballer

Personal information
- Full name: Graham John Griffiths
- Date of birth: 5 November 1944 (age 81)
- Place of birth: New Zealand

Senior career*
| Years | Team | Apps | (Gls) |
| 1969 | Christchurch Technical | | |
| 1970–1977 | Christchurch United | | |

International career
| 1969–1975 | New Zealand | 12 | (0) |
- * Club domestic league appearances and goals

Graham John Griffiths (born 5 November 1944) is an association football player who represented New Zealand at international level.

Griffiths made his full All Whites debut in a 0–0 draw New Caledonia on 25 July 1969 and ended his international playing career with 12 A-international caps to his credit, his final cap an appearance in a 2–0 win over China on 26 July 1975.

Griffiths is one of a very small number of players to have gained four Chatham Cup winners' medals, as part of the Christchurch United team in 1972, 1974, 1975, and 1976.
