= George McLaren (Australian footballer) =

Australian rules footballer and coach

Personal information
- Full name: George Eric McLaren
- Born: 22 March 1925
- Died: 23 July 1956 (aged 31)
- Original team: Essendon District
- Height: 170 cm (5 ft 7 in)
- Weight: 68 kg (150 lb)
- Position: Wingman

Playing career^{1}
Years	Club	Games (Goals)
1944–1951	Footscray	139 (24)

Coaching career
Years	Club	Games (W–L–D)
1951	Footscray	1 (1–0–0)
- ^{1} Playing statistics correct to the end of 1951.

George Eric McLaren (22 March 1925 – 23 July 1956) was an Australian rules footballer who played for Footscray in the Victorian Football League (VFL) during the 1940s and early 1950s.

A wingman, McLaren was recruited from the Essendon District League. He started out at Footscray in 1944 and two years later represented Victoria in an interstate match against South Australia. In the 1951 season, his last, McLaren filled in as coach for a game against Richmond which they won by 26 points.

McLaren was killed in a car accident in 1956.
