= Iain Marshall =

Scottish-born New Zealand footballer

Personal information
- Full name: J Marshall
- Place of birth: Scotland

Senior career*
Years	Team	Apps	(Gls)
- Christchurch United

International career
1981	New Zealand	3	(0)
- * Club domestic league appearances and goals

Iain Marshall is a former association football player who represented New Zealand at international level.

Marshall played three official full internationals for New Zealand, making his debut in a 1–1 draw with India on 1 September 1981. His other two matches were a 0–1 loss to United Arab Emirates on 9 September and a 1–0 win over Japan on 12 October 1981.
