= John Raat =

New Zealand footballer

Personal information
- Full name: John C Raat
- Date of birth: 22-06-1936
- Place of birth: Jakarta, Indonesia (Dutch East Indies)
- Date of death: 24-09-2024
- Position: Inside forward

Senior career*
Years	Team	Apps	(Gls)
- Diamond

International career
1960	New Zealand	2	(3)
- * Club domestic league appearances and goals

John Raat is a former football (soccer) player who represented New Zealand at international level.

Raat played two official A-international matches for the New Zealand in 1960, both against Pacific minnows Tahiti, the first a 5–1 win on 5 September, the second a 2–1 win on 12 September 1960. He scored two of New Zealand's goals in the first game and one in the second for a total of three goals in official matches.
