= Paul Cameron (New Zealand footballer) =

New Zealand footballer

Personal information
- Full name: C Paul Cameron
- Place of birth: New Zealand

Senior career*
Years	Team	Apps	(Gls)
- Wellington City

International career
1972	New Zealand	2	(0)
- * Club domestic league appearances and goals

Paul Cameron is a former association football player who represented New Zealand at the international level.

Cameron played two official A-international matches for the New Zealand in 1972, both against New Caledonia, the first as a substitute in a 4–1 win on 17 September, the second starting in a 1–3 loss on 14 October 1972.
