= List of first association football internationals per country: 1962–present =

The following is a list of first official international association football matches for each (present or past) member of FIFA, played since the start of 1963. The matches are listed chronologically.

== Matches ==
=== Liberia and Chad ===
11 April 1963 L'Amitié Tournament	Liberia	2–1	Chad	Dakar, Senegal
	Not known (?)		Not known (?)

=== Congo DR and Mauritania ===
11 April 1963 L'Amitié Tournament	Belgian Congo	6–0	Mauritania	Dakar, Senegal
	Not known (?)

=== Niger ===
11 April 1963 L'Amitié Tournament	Nigeria	1–0	Niger	Dakar, Senegal
	Not known (?)

=== Papua New Guinea ===
29 August 1963 South Pacific Games	Fiji	3–1	Papua New Guinea	Suva, Fiji
	Not known (?)		Not known (?)

=== Solomon Islands ===
29 August 1963 South Pacific Games	Solomon Islands	6–3	New Hebrides	Suva, Fiji
	Not known (?)		Not known (?)

=== Somalia ===
12 November 1963 Games of the New Emerging Forces	Somalia	0–14	North Korea	Jakarta, Indonesia
			Not known (?); Not known (?)	Stadium: Bung Karno Stadium

=== Bermuda ===
10 August 1964 Friendly	Iceland	4–3	Bermuda	Reykjavík, Iceland
	Not known (?)		Not known (?)

=== (North) Yemen ===
2 September 1965 Pan Arab Games	Sudan	9–0	North Yemen	Cairo, Egypt
	Jaksa (?) (?) (?) (?); Siddig (?) (?); Muhieldin Osman (?); Saad Elfan (?); Ibrahim Yahia Elkawarty (?)

=== South Yemen ===
3 September 1965 Pan Arab Games	United Arab Republic	14–0	South Yemen	Cairo, Egypt
	Hassan El-Shazly (?); Moustafa Reyadh (?); Badawi Abdel Fattah (?); Ahmed Rifaat (?); Shehta (?)

=== Oman ===
4 September 1965 Pan Arab Games	Sudan	15–0	Muscat and Oman	Cairo, Egypt
	Mustafa Shaweish (?) (?) (?) (?); Ramadan Marhoum (?) (?) (?) (?); Hasabu El Sagheir (?) (?) (?); Samir Salih (?) (?); Ibrahim Yahia Elkawarty (?); Amin Zaki (?)

=== Grenada ===
21 November 1965 Windward Islands Tournament	Dominica	2–0	Grenada	Saint Vincent and the Grenadines
	Not known (?)

=== Bahrain ===
1 April 1966 Arab Nations Cup	Kuwait	4–4	Bahrain	Baghdad, Iraq
	Not known (?)		Not known (?)

=== Dominican Republic ===
21 May 1967 Olympic Games qualifier	Dominican Republic	0–8	Haiti	Santo Domingo, Dominican Republic
			Not known (?); Not known (?)

=== Eswatini ===
1 May 1968 Friendly	Swaziland (United Kingdom)	2–0	Malawi	Lobamba, Swaziland
	Not known (?)			Stadium: Somhlolo National Stadium

=== Botswana ===
13 July 1968 Friendly	Malawi	8–1	Botswana	Blantyre, Malawi
	Not known (?); Not known (?)		Not known (?)	Stadium: Kamuzu Stadium

=== Bahamas ===
3 March 1970 Central American and Caribbean Games	Netherlands Antilles	8–1	Bahamas	Panama City, Panama
	Martina 8', 75'; Loefstok 38'; Martis 42', 43'; Richardson 63'; Flores 66'; Martijn 89'		Haven 50'	Referee: José Barrone (Venezuela)

=== Qatar ===
27 March 1970 Gulf Cup	Bahrain	2–1	Qatar	Bahrain
	Not known (?)		Not known (?)

=== Lesotho ===
8 August 1970 Friendly	Malawi	1–2	Lesotho	Blantyre, Malawi
	Not known (?)		Not known (?)	Stadium: Kamuzu Stadium

=== Brunei ===
21 May 1971 Asian Cup qualifier	Malaysia	8–0	Brunei	Bangkok, Thailand
	Not known (?); Not known (?)

=== Cook Islands ===
2 September 1971 South Pacific Games	Tahiti	30–0	(New Zealand) Cook Islands	Papeete, French Polynesia
	Not known (?); Not known (?); Not known (?); Not known (?); Not known (?)

=== Burundi ===
5 December 1971 Friendly	Tanzania	4–1	Burundi	Dar es Salaam, Tanzania
	Not known (?)		Not known (?)

=== United Arab Emirates ===
17 March 1972 Gulf Cup	United Arab Emirates	1–0	Qatar	Saudi Arabia
	Not known (?)

=== Nepal ===
13 October 1972 Friendly	China	6–2	Nepal	China
	Not known (?)		Not known (?)

=== Antigua & Barbuda ===
13 October 1972 World Cup qualifier	Trinidad and Tobago	11–1	Antigua and Barbuda	Port of Spain, Trinidad and Tobago
	Llewellyn 19', 38', 44'; David 42', 70', 79'; Spann 49', 68'; Brewster 59'; Roberts 83', 89'		Morris 20'	Stadium: King George V Park; Attendance: 6,510; Referee: José Esteban Álvarez Alfaro (Nicaragua)

=== Bangladesh ===
27 July 1973 Merdeka Tournament	Bangladesh	2–2 (5–6 p)	Thailand	Kuala Lumpur, Malaysia
	Enayetur 61'; Salahuddin 88'	Report	Manas 27'; Niwatana 90'	Stadium: Stadium Merdeka; Attendance: 3,000

=== Seychelles ===
13 March 1974 Friendly	Réunion	2–0	Seychelles	Saint-Louis, Réunion
	Not known (?)

=== Equatorial Guinea ===
23 May 1975 Friendly	China	6–2	Equatorial Guinea	Beijing, China
	Not known (?)		Not known (?)

=== Guam ===
24 August 1975 South Pacific Games	Guam	0–11	Fiji	Guam
			Not known (?); Not known (?)

=== Guinea-Bissau ===
15 January 1976 Friendly	Guinea-Bissau	2–2	Mali	Banjul, Gambia
	Not known (?)		Not known (?)

=== Rwanda ===
29 June 1976 Central African Games	Burundi	6–2	Rwanda	Libreville, Gabon
	Not known (?)		Not known (?)

=== São Tomé & Príncipe ===
29 June 1976 Central African Games	Chad	5–0	São Tomé and Príncipe	Libreville, Gabon
	Not known (?)

=== Angola ===
1 June 1977 Friendly	Angola	1–0	Cuba	Luanda, Angola
	Not known (?)

=== Mozambique ===
20 December 1977 Friendly	Mozambique	1–2	Tanzania	Maputo, Mozambique
	Not known (?)		Not known (?)

=== Cape Verde ===
7 January 1979 Amílcar Cabral Cup	Guinea-Bissau	3–0	Cape Verde	Bissau, Guinea-Bissau
	Not known (?)

=== Saint Vincent & the Grenadines ===
February 1979 CFU Championship	Martinique	2–2	Saint Vincent and the Grenadines	Suriname
	Not known (?)		Not known (?)

=== Saint Kitts & Nevis ===
3 June 1979 CFU Championship	Jamaica	2–1	Saint Christopher-Nevis-Anguilla	Suriname
	Not known (?)		Not known (?)

=== Samoa ===
22 August 1979 South Pacific Games	Wallis and Futuna	3–1	Western Samoa	Fiji
	Not known (?)		Not known (?)

=== Comoros ===
26 August 1979 Indian Ocean Games	Mauritius	3–0	Comoros	Saint-Denis, Réunion
	Not known (?)

=== Tonga ===
29 August 1979 South Pacific Games	Tahiti	8–0	Tonga	Fiji
	Not known (?); Not known (?)

=== Maldives ===
26 August 1979 Indian Ocean Games	Seychelles	9–0	Maldives	Saint-Denis, Réunion
	Not known (?); Not known (?)

=== Liechtenstein ===
9 March 1982 Friendly	Liechtenstein	0–1	Switzerland "B"	Balzers, Liechtenstein
			Not known (?)

=== Bhutan ===
1 April 1982 Friendly Tournament	Nepal	3–1	Bhutan	Kathmandu, Nepal
	Not known (?)		Not known (?)	Stadium: Dasharat Stadium

=== American Samoa ===
20 August 1983 South Pacific Games	Western Samoa	3–1	American Samoa	Apia, Western Samoa
	Not known (?)		Not known (?)

=== Faroe Islands ===
24 August 1988 Friendly	Iceland	1–0	Faroe Islands	Akranes, Iceland
	Torfason (?)

=== Dominica ===
1 May 1989 Caribbean Championship	Dominica	1–1	Jamaica	Dominica
	Not known (?)		Not known (?)

=== Namibia ===
16 May 1989 Friendly	Namibia (South Africa)	0–1	Angola	Oscar Norich Stadium, Tsumeb
			Not known (?)

=== Saint Lucia ===
18 June 1989 Caribbean Championship	Jamaica	1–1	Saint Lucia	Kingston, Jamaica
	Not known (?)		Not known (?)

=== Georgia ===
27 May 1990 Friendly	Georgia	2–2	Lithuania	Tbilisi, Georgia
	Not known (?)		Not known (?)

=== San Marino ===
14 November 1990 Euro 1992 qualifier	San Marino	0–4	Switzerland	Serravalle, San Marino
			Sutter 7'; Chapuisat 27'; Knup 43'; Chassot 87'	Stadium: Stadio Olimpico; Attendance: 931; Referee: Costas Kapsos (Cyprus)

=== Cayman Islands and British Virgin Islands ===
10 May 1991 Caribbean Cup	Cayman Islands	2–1	British Virgin Islands	Basseterre, Saint Kitts and Nevis
	Not known (?)		Not known (?)

=== Montserrat ===
10 May 1991 Caribbean Cup	Saint Lucia	3–0	Montserrat	Castries, Saint Lucia
	Not known (?)

=== Anguilla ===
14 May 1991 Caribbean Cup	Montserrat	1–1	Anguilla	Castries, Saint Lucia
	Not known (?)		Not known (?)

=== Moldova ===
2 July 1991 Friendly	Moldova	2–4	Georgia	Chișinău, Moldova
	Spiridon 27', Harea 50'		Ketsbaia 5', Daraselia 13', Jishkariani 79', Kavelashvili 88'	Stadium: Stadionul Republican; Attendance: 7,000; Referee: Gorin

=== Vietnam ===
26 November 1991 Southeast Asian Games	Philippines	2–2	Vietnam	Manila, Philippines
	Not known (?)		Not known (?)	Stadium: Rizal Memorial Stadium

=== Ukraine ===
29 April 1992 Friendly	Ukraine	1–3	Hungary	Uzhhorod, Ukraine
	Hetsko 90'		Sallói 61'; Kiprich 79', 84'	Stadium: Avanhard Stadium; Attendance: 13,000; Referee: Vadim Zhuk (Belarus)

=== Kazakhstan and Turkmenistan ===
1 June 1992 Central Asia Tournament	Kazakhstan (Kazakh Soviet Socialist Republic)	1–0	Turkmenistan	Almaty, Kazakhstan
	Not known (?)

=== Slovenia ===
3 June 1992 Friendly	Estonia	1–1	Slovenia	Tallinn, Estonia
	Pustov 5'		Benedejčič 73'	Attendance: 1,000; Referee: Aho Eero (Finland)

=== Tajikistan and Uzbekistan ===
17 June 1992 Central Asia Tournament	Tajikistan (Tajik Soviet Socialist Republic)	2–2	Uzbekistan	Dushanbe, Tajikistan
	Not known (?)		Not known (?)

=== Eritrea ===
26 June 1992 Friendly Tournament	Sudan	1–1	Eritrea	Khartoum, Sudan
	Not known (?)		Not known (?)

=== Andorra ===
26 June 1992 Friendly	Andorra	1–6	Estonia	Andorra la Vella, Andorra
	Pol 61'		Zelinski 36'; Arbeiter 64', 74', 76', 84'; Kristal 87'

=== Belarus ===
20 July 1992 Friendly	Lithuania	1–1	Belarus	Vilnius, Lithuania
	Baltušnikas 26'		Orlovski 50'	Stadium: Žalgiris Stadium; Attendance: 3,500; Referee: Anatolijus Rezepovas (Lithuania)

=== Kyrgyzstan ===
23 August 1992 Central Asia Tournament	Uzbekistan	3–0	Kyrgyzstan	Tashkent, Uzbekistan
	Not known (?)

=== Azerbaijan ===
17 September 1992 Friendly	Georgia	6–3	Azerbaijan	Gurjaani, Georgia
	Kizilashvili 20', 48'; Daraselia 52'; Arveladze 69'; Gogichaishvili 71' (pen.); Gogichaishvili 79' (pen.)	(Report)	42', 85' (pen.) Suleymanov; 77' Rzayev	Stadium: David Kipiani Stadium; Attendance: 3,000; Referee: Guram Sepiashvili (Georgia)

=== Armenia ===
14 October 1992 Friendly	Armenia	0–0	Moldova	Yerevan, Armenia

=== Bosnia & Herzegovina ===
12 September 1993 Friendly	Iran	1–3	Bosnia and Herzegovina	Tehran, Iran
	Not known (?)		Not known (?)	Stadium: Azadi Stadium

=== Macedonia ===
13 October 1993 Friendly	Slovenia	1–4	North Macedonia	Kranj, Slovenia
	Pate 40'		Boškovski 3'; Pančev 37'; Janevski 48'; Kanatlarovski 51'	Stadium: Stanko Mlakar Stadium; Attendance: 3,000

=== Belize ===
29 November 1995 UNCAF Nations Cup	El Salvador	3–0	Belize	San Salvador, El Salvador
	Cienfuegos 55'; Rivera 58'; Díaz 76'

=== U.S. Virgin Islands ===
21 March 1998 Friendly	U.S. Virgin Islands	1–0	British Virgin Islands	Charlotte Amalie, U.S. Virgin Islands
	Not known (?)

=== Turks & Caicos Islands ===
24 February 1999 Caribbean Nations Cup	Bahamas	3–0	Turks and Caicos Islands	Nassau, Bahamas
	Not known (?)

=== Timor-Leste ===
21 March 2003 Asian Cup qualifier	Sri Lanka	3–2	Timor-Leste	Colombo, Sri Lanka
	Jayasuriya 36'; Channa 44', 89'		Hamza 3' (o.g.); Cabral 81'

=== Serbia ===
16 August 2006 Friendly	Czech Republic	1–3	Serbia	Uherské Hradiště, Czech Republic
	Štajner 3'		Lazović 41'; Pantelić 54'; Trišović 72'	Stadium: Mestsky-Stonky Stadium; Attendance: 8,047; Referee: Dietmar Drabek (Austria)

=== Montenegro ===
24 March 2007 Friendly	Montenegro	2–1	Hungary	Podgorica, Montenegro
	Vucinić 64'; Burzanović 82'		Priskin 1'	Stadium: Stadion Pod Goricom; Attendance: 10,000

=== South Sudan ===
10 July 2012 Friendly	South Sudan	2–2	Uganda	Juba, South Sudan
	Justin 22' (pen.); Joseph 42'		Okuthi 7'; Ogwang 33'	Stadium: Juba Stadium; Attendance: 20,000

=== Gibraltar ===
19 November 2013 Friendly	Gibraltar	0–0	Slovakia	Faro, Portugal
19:30 CET (UTC+1)		Report		Stadium: Estádio Algarve; Attendance: 350; Referee: Hugo Ferreira Miguel (Portugal)

=== Kosovo ===
5 March 2014 Friendly	Kosovo	0–0	Haiti	Mitrovica, Kosovo
15:00 CET (UTC+1)		Report		Stadium: Adem Jashari Olympic Stadium; Attendance: 17,000; Referee: Stephan Klossner (Switzerland)

== See also ==
- List of first association football internationals per country: before 1940
- List of first association football internationals per country: 1940–1962

== Notes ==
A.Armenia, Azerbaijan and Georgia played in the triangular "Trans-Caucasian Championship" in 1926–27. Although these matches are included in the ELO ratings for each country, they are not considered "official" matches by the Rec.Sport.Soccer Statistics Foundation.
B.Grenada played four matches between 1934 and 1938 against British Guiana and St. Kitts & Nevis; the official status of these matches is unclear.
C.Saint Vincent and the Grenadines played three matches in 1948 against Trinidad & Tobago; the official status of these matches is unclear.
D.Dominica played four matches between 1932 and 1948 against Martinique; the official status of these matches is unclear.
