= Sean Byrne (New Zealand footballer) =

New Zealand footballer

Personal information
- Full name: Sean Patrick Byrne
- Date of birth: 23 August 1955
- Place of birth: Dublin, Ireland
- Date of death: 11 August 2003 (aged 47)
- Place of death: Melbourne, Australia
- Position: Defender

Senior career*
Years	Team	Apps	(Gls)
????–1977	St Patrick's Athletic		
1977–1983	Dundalk	135	(23)
1983–1989	Gisborne City		
1989–1990	Morwell Falcons		
1991–1992	Traralgon Olympians		

International career
1974-1983	LOI XI	6	(0)
1984–1985	New Zealand	5	(0)

Managerial career
- 1995–2001: Morwell Pegasus
- * Club domestic league appearances and goals

Sean Patrick Byrne (23 August 1955 – 11 August 2003) was an association football player who played as a defender. Born in Ireland, he represented the New Zealand national team at international level.

Byrne was a highly regarded player at Dundalk, forming an outstanding combination in central midfield with Leo Flanagan.

Perhaps the highlight of his career was in Dundalk's 1981–82 European Cup Winners' Cup tie against Tottenham Hotspur when Byrne successfully curtailed the influence of English superstar Glenn Hoddle and Argentinian international Ossie Ardiles - despite Spurs claiming a 2-1 aggregate victory.

A move to New Zealand club Gisborne City followed and it was there after some outstanding performances in the New Zealand Football Championship that Byrne was called up for the New Zealand men's national football team.

Byrne made his full All Whites debut in a 2–1 win over Fiji on 18 October 1984 and ended his international playing career with five A-international caps to his credit, his final cap an appearance in a 5–1 win over Taiwan on 5 October 1985.

At the age of 34, Byrne moved to Victorian State League club Morwell Falcons in 1989, where he soon proved to be one of the league's finest midfielders over two outstanding campaigns.

Byrne played a pivotal role in the Falcons' 1989 Championship winning run. He was named in the midfield of the Falcons' "Team of the State League era" squad, which was announced in 2011.

After a successful stint with the Falcons in the State League, Byrne stayed in the Gippsland area and joined Latrobe Valley Soccer League side Traralgon Olympians, where he played the final two years of his career - winning the League championship in 1991 before helping Olympians to the 1992 Battle of Britain Cup, where they thumped LVSL champions Morwell Pegasus 5-0.

Byrne remained in the Latrobe Valley for the remainder of his life, and took on the role of manager at Morwell Pegasus in 1995, leading the club to a string of promotions in the subsequent years as they quickly progressed up the Victorian State League pyramid.

However, Byrne fell victim to motor neuron disease and died in 2003, aged 48.

In 2008, Morwell Pegasus decided to honour Byrne's legacy by announcing that the club's Player of the Year award would be renamed in his honour.
