= Kevin Birch =

New Zealand footballer

Personal information
- Full name: Kevin John Birch
- Date of birth: 21 December 1961 (age 64)
- Place of birth: Auckland, New Zealand
- Position: Defender

Youth career
- Manurewa

Senior career*
Years	Team	Apps	(Gls)
?–1984	Manurewa		
1985–?	Gisborne City		

International career
1984–1985	New Zealand	9	(0)
- * Club domestic league appearances and goals

Kevin Birch (born 21 December 1961) is a former association football player who represented New Zealand at international level.

In 1982, Birch played as a guest player for the victorious Taranaki XI against the touring AFC Bournemouth at Pukekura Park.

Birch made his full All Whites debut in a 6–1 win over Malaysia on 3 April 1984 and ended his international playing career with 9 A-international caps to his credit, his final cap a substitute appearance in a 2–0 win over Fiji on 7 June 1985.
