= Ted Charlton (New Zealand footballer) =

New Zealand footballer

Personal information
- Full name: Edward Charlton
- Place of birth: New Zealand

Senior career*
Years	Team	Apps	(Gls)
- Technical Old Boys

International career
1960	New Zealand	2	(3)
- * Club domestic league appearances and goals

Edward Charlton is a former association football player who represented New Zealand at international level.

Charlton played two official A-international matches for the New Zealand in 1960, both against Pacific minnows Tahiti, the first a 5–1 win on 5 September, the second a 2–1 win on 12 September 1960. He scored two of New Zealand's goals in the first game and one in the second for a total of three goals in official matches.

In August 1960 the Christchurch Press ran a detailed brief titled "Miles and Goals" recording Charton's achievements throughout the 1960 season.
