= Gary Lake =

New Zealand footballer

Personal information
- Full name: Gary T Lake
- Place of birth: New Zealand
- Position: Defender

Senior career*
Years	Team	Apps	(Gls)
- Ponsonby

International career
1967–1973	New Zealand	10	(0)
Medal record
Men's association football
Representing New Zealand
OFC Nations Cup
Winner	1973 New Zealand
- * Club domestic league appearances and goals

Gary Lake is a former association football player who represented New Zealand at international level.

Lake made his full All Whites debut in a 3–5 loss to Australia on 5 November 1967 and ended his international playing career with 10 A-international caps to his credit, his final cap an appearance in a 0–4 loss to Iraq on 24 March 1973.

== Honours ==
New Zealand

- OFC Nations Cup: 1973
