= Grahame Bilby =

New Zealand cricketer and footballer

Personal information
- Full name: Grahame Paul Bilby
- Date of birth: 7 May 1941 (age 85)
- Place of birth: Wellington, New Zealand

Senior career*
| Years | Team | Apps | (Gls) |
| ante 1964–1970 | Seatoun | | |
| 1971–? | Wellington City | | |

International career
| 1967–1971 | New Zealand | 8 | (1) |
- * Club domestic league appearances and goals

Grahame Bilby
Cricket information
- Batting: Right-handed

International information
- National side: New Zealand
- Test debut (cap 110): 25 February 1966 v England
- Last Test: 4 March 1966 v England

Domestic team information
- Years: Team
- 1962/63–1975/76: Wellington

Career statistics
| Competition | Test | FC | LA |
|---|---|---|---|
| Matches | 2 | 57 | 10 |
| Runs scored | 55 | 2,936 | 206 |
| Batting average | 13.75 | 32.62 | 25.75 |
| 100s/50s | 0/0 | 3/15 | 0/0 |
| Top score | 28 | 161 | 38 |
| Balls bowled | – | 126 | 7 |
| Wickets | – | 1 | 2 |
| Bowling average | – | 34.00 | 2.00 |
| 5 wickets in innings | – | 0 | 0 |
| 10 wickets in match | – | 0 | 0 |
| Best bowling | – | 1/2 | 2/4 |
| Catches/stumpings | 3/– | 55/– | 3/– |
- Source: Cricinfo, 1 April 2017

Grahame Paul Bilby (born 7 May 1941) is a former New Zealand cricketer and association football player who represented both the New Zealand national cricket team and the New Zealand national football team.

== Cricket career ==
An opening batsman, Bilby played in two Tests against the English cricket team, in Christchurch and Dunedin in 1965–66. Both Tests were drawn. He scored 28 and 3 in the first Test and 3 and 21 in the second. He was caught behind in three of those dismissals, and also took three catches in the field.

Bilby played his domestic cricket for Wellington from 1962–63 to 1975–76. His innings of 161 against Otago in the 1965–66 season, the highest score in the competition, probably earned him his Test debut later that season. In his first-class career he played in 57 matches, with a respectable 32.62 average, and which included 3 centuries and 15 fifties. He was named New Zealand Cricket Almanack Player of the Year in 1974.

== Football career ==
Bilby made his full All Whites debut in a 0–4 loss to New Caledonia on 8 November 1967. He ended his international playing career with 8 A-international caps and 1 goal to his credit, his final cap a substitute appearance in a 2–4 loss, also to New Caledonia, on 18 July 1971.

== Personal life ==
After attending Rongotai College, Bilby spent his working life in information technology. He and his wife Joy have two daughters and a son.
