= H. P. Devitte =

Swiss football referee of English descent

H. P. Devitte (born 1881) was a Swiss football referee of English descent. He lived in Geneva where he was a football referee. He most notably refereed the German national football team's first ever international match on 5 April 1908, which Switzerland won 5–3 in Basel.

Between 1908–13, he refereed at least ten senior international matches.
