= Colin Shaw (New Zealand footballer) =

New Zealand footballer

Personal information
- Full name: Colin H Shaw
- Place of birth: New Zealand

Senior career*
Years	Team	Apps	(Gls)
- Blockhouse Bay

International career
1967–1968	New Zealand	5	(8)
- * Club domestic league appearances and goals

Colin Shaw is a retired football (soccer) player who represented New Zealand at the international level.

Shaw scored on his full All Whites debut in a 3–5 loss to Australia on 5 November 1967 and ended his international playing career with five A-international caps, scoring 8 goals, including back to back hat-tricks against Malaysia and Fiji. His final cap was an appearance in a 1–3 loss to New Caledonia on 8 October 1968.

== Career statistics ==
=== International goals ===
#	Date	Venue	Opponent	Score	Result	Competition
1.	5 November 1967	Thống Nhất Stadium, Saigon, South Vietnam	Australia	3–5	Loss	Friendly
2.	10 November 1967	Thống Nhất Stadium, Saigon, South Vietnam	South Vietnam	5–1	Loss	Friendly
3.	16 November 1967	Independence Stadium, Kuala Lumpur, Malaysia	Malaysia	2–8	Win	Friendly
4.	16 November 1967	Independence Stadium, Kuala Lumpur, Malaysia	Malaysia	2–8	Win	Friendly
5.	16 November 1967	Independence Stadium, Kuala Lumpur, Malaysia	Malaysia	2–8	Win	Friendly
6.	17 September 1968	Auckland, New Zealand	Fiji	5–0	Win	Friendly
7.	17 September 1968	Auckland, New Zealand	Fiji	5–0	Win	Friendly
8.	17 September 1968	Auckland, New Zealand	Fiji	5–0	Win	Friendly
Correct as of 11 October 2017
