= Ian Park =

New Zealand footballer

Personal information
- Full name: Ian Park

Senior career*
Years	Team	Apps	(Gls)
- Christchurch United
1977–1978	Brisbane Lions	22	(0)

International career
1973–1980	New Zealand	20	(0)
- * Club domestic league appearances and goals

Ian Park is a former association football player who represented New Zealand.

Park made his full All Whites debut as a substitute in a 0–0 draw with Iran on 18 August 1973. He ended his international playing career with 20 A-international caps to his credit, his final cap in a 6–1 win over Solomon Islands on 29 February 1980.
