= Dave McKissock =

New Zealand footballer

Personal information
- Full name: David McKissock
- Position: Half-back

Senior career*
| Years | Team | Apps | (Gls) |
- Railways
- Petone

International career
| 1948–1951 | New Zealand | 9 | (1) |
- * Club domestic league appearances and goals

David McKissock is a former association footballer who represented New Zealand at international level.

McKissock made his full All Whites debut in a 0–6 loss to Australia on 14 August 1948 and ended his international playing career with 9 A-international caps and 1 goal to his credit, his final cap and only goal coming in a 6–4 win over Fiji on 7 October 1951.
