= Jim Mutimer =

New Zealand footballer

Personal information
- Full name: James R Mutimer
- Place of birth: New Zealand
- Position: Forward

Senior career*
Years	Team	Apps	(Gls)
- Masterton Athletic

International career
1951	New Zealand	3	(1)
- * Club domestic league appearances and goals

Jim Mutimer is a former association football player who represented New Zealand at international level.

Mutimer played three official A-international matches for New Zealand in 1951, the first two against New Caledonia, the first a 6–4 win on 22 September, followed by a 0–2 loss two days later on 24 September. His third and final official international was a 6–4 win over Fiji on 7 October 1951, Mutimer scoring his only international goal in that game
