= Christchurch United FC =

New Zealand association football club

- Full name: Christchurch United Football Club
- Nicknames: United; The Rams
- Founded: 1970; 56 years ago
- Ground: United Sports Centre, Christchurch
- Chairman: Viatcheslav Meyn
- Manager: Albert Riera
- League: Southern League
- 2026: Southern League, 7th of 10
- Website: cufc.co.nz
Home colours	Away colours

Christchurch United Football Club is a professional football club in Christchurch, New Zealand. They compete in the Southern League, as well as various Mainland Football competitions at Junior and Senior level. It was one of the founding clubs of the NZ National Soccer League in 1970, and is one of the most successful clubs to come out of it. The club has won six National League titles and seven Chatham Cup trophies.

== Club history ==
=== Formation ===
Chart of yearly ladder positions for Christchurch United in NZ 1st division soccer

The club was formed via the merger and support of several Christchurch clubs in the early 1970s, ostensibly to provide a strong Christchurch team for participation in the New Zealand National Soccer League.

The teams involved were Christchurch City AFC, Western AFC, Shamrock, and Christchurch Technical, though some of these sides continued to play on as separate sides after the formation of United.

=== Glory Years ===
When the New Zealand National League formed in 1970, Christchurch United was the only applicant from the South Island to take part in the inaugural competition. The Christchurch United squad set multiple milestones in the first season of the competition, including the first player to score a hat-trick after Robin Taylor’s four goals against Gisborne City. United finished their first season in the National League in third place behind Eastern Suburbs and champions Blockhouse Bay. The second season finished with another third-place finish, this time missing out on the title by a single point to champions Mount Wellington.

In the 1972 season, Christchurch United claimed its first piece of silverware with a victory over Mount Wellington to secure the Chatham Cup. With a 4-4 draw in Wellington followed by a 1-1 draw at English Park, United claimed their first trophy after a 2-1 win at Newmarket Park in Auckland. Following their first silverware in 1972, Christchurch United went on to win the 1973 National League in a record-breaking season: United won the title by eight points, as well as conceding only 11 goals in 18 matches. In 1974, United won their second Chatham Cup by defeating Wellington Diamond United 2-0 with goals from club legends Ian Park and Brian Hardman.

The 1975 season proved to be one of the best in the history of the club, winning both the National League and Chatham Cup against a competitive North Shore United team. This double was the first of its kind achieved in the history of New Zealand football and remains the strongest season in the history of the club. Former New Zealand international Phil Dando, who played for United in the 1975 season, lauded a team that had a "strong winning mentality", and “an incredible inner drive” to chase their footballing dreams.

=== 1980s ===
The early 1980s did not show the same success that Christchurch United had achieved in the 1970s, in large part due to a significant exodus of players who went to play in the Australian League. The tide began to change in 1987, when United won their last seven games consecutively to secure the National League title. The club also won the now-defunct NZFA Challenge Cup, but were denied a treble season by Gisborne City, who humbled United 7-3 over two games. United made it two in a row by winning the 1988 National League, in which the club set the national record for least goals conceded in a 26-match season, with 14. This season also saw United legend Keith Braithwaite put six goals past Manurewa during an 8-0 win, another record that stands to this day. The following year, Christchurch United won the Chatham Cup for the fifth time after defeating Rotorua City 7-1, which remains the largest margin of victory for a Chatham Cup final.

=== The Gisborne Incident ===
On 10 August 1981, a disagreement between players and head coach Terry Conley occurred in which six players were assigned fines for drinking alcohol the night before a game. Four of the six fined players refused to pay their fines, as they insisted, they had not been drinking and had been lumped in with the other two players who were, due to them being in the same room as the pair. This standoff between the coach and the players resulted in Christchurch United having to field only nine men against Gisborne City, in what has been described as “a bizarre and unique situation unlikely to ever occur again at that level of football anywhere in the world”. The event was immortalised in local football folklore as “the Gisborne Incident”, an event that resulted in four key players, including club legends Bobby Almond and Ian Park subsequently leaving the club.

=== 1990s ===
Despite successes in the National League and Chatham Cup competitions, Christchurch United had not won both trophies in the same season since 1975. Having won the National League in dominant fashion in 1991, Christchurch United subsequently defeated Wellington United 2-1 in an intense Chatham Cup final that saw United claim their second double in club history. This 1991 season is often coined as being one of the most significant in club history, alongside the 1975 season. At the end of the National League season the following year, the competition was disbanded by the New Zealand Football Association. 1993 then saw the introduction of a regional competition with a playoff system, in which United failed to replicate the success of previous eras. As a result, the club spent the best part of the 1990s finishing low or mid table in the Superclub Southern League. In 1997, Christchurch United was one of the Christchurch-based clubs that proposed a Canterbury League, designed to ease the burden of travel costs that had become increasingly difficult to budget. This proposal resulted in the creation of the Canterbury Premier League, which morphed into today’s Mainland Premier League.

=== 1998–2006 Canterbury Premier League ===
The first year of the Canterbury Premier League saw United field a strong team composed of current and future New Zealand internationals, including the young yet unwavering pair of Ryan Nelsen and Ben Sigmund in central defence. Christchurch United won the 1998 season by seven points, scoring 67 and conceding six. The following three years became a three-way battle between Christchurch United, Christchurch Rangers, and newly formed Halswell United, in which United struggled to overcome the dominance of the other two. Lack of funding in the following few seasons saw the club slip further down the table, and the club were relegated in 2006 for the first time in their history.

=== 2007–2016 ===
The competition in the second tier of Canterbury Football was notoriously fierce, which was noted when Burnside put on a dominant 2007 season that let them finish 14 points clear of third-place United. After an intense match against Avon United in the penultimate game of the 2008 season, a 3-2 victory, courtesy of a 91st minute winner by Steve Hill, spurred the team to a 6-0 victory against Canterbury United in the final game of the season to secure promotion back to the Mainland Premier League. United fought in the lower end of the Mainland Premier League for several years, and the loss of their home ground following the destruction of QEII Stadium from the 2010-2011 Christchurch earthquakes forced the team to relocate from what had been their home ground since 1974. Now playing their home games from English Park, United were relegated for a second time in 2012. After a hard-fought couple of seasons, the club were once again promoted to the Mainland Premier League in 2014. In the following season, United moved their first team games to Spreydon Domain for the first time in the club’s history, which brought the junior and senior sections of the club closer together. During this period, United began to merge the committees of both sections; this resulted in first team players getting more involved with the junior teams and provided the opportunity for youth players to break into the first team. However, a rocky season resulted in the club’s third relegation in 2015.

=== 2017–present ===
With the future of the club surrounded by uncertainty, the Christchurch United board began merger discussions with the Christchurch Football Academy (CFA), an independent entity that had formed in 2014. The CFA was created by Russian businessman Vyacheslav Meyn, who had settled in the city in 2009 and established the CFA to provide an all-year-round football programme in Christchurch. Due to local regulations, the CFA had been unable to establish a new club in the city and were instead encouraged to merge with a pre-existing club in Christchurch. United struck an agreement with the CFA in late 2016, and a new board was created with representatives from both Christchurch United and the CFA. Following a couple of disappointing seasons, United appointed former New Zealand international and club legend Danny Halligan as first team head coach in 2019. Christchurch United dominated the 2019 season by going on a 12-game winning streak and finishing the season with 57 goals scored and only five conceded. The following promotion to the Mainland Premier League is where the club has remained since. The 2021 season ended with Christchurch United finishing third in the Mainland Premier League, and narrowly missing out on the English Cup after a 2-0 defeat to Cashmere Technical in the final. United parted ways with Halligan in late 2021, appointing Samoa Women’s National Team head coach Paul Ifill in his place. Paul Ifill left the club to become manager of Wellington Olympic at the end of the 2023 season and was replaced by Ryan Edwards.

== OFC Professional League ==
Christchurch United was selected as an inaugural club to compete in the newly-formed OFC Pro League, starting in January 2026.

The club will compete under the banner of South Island United, with the aim of representing the whole of the South Island region of New Zealand.

== Season by season record ==
2021– (National League)

Season	Southern League									National League									English Cup	Chatham Cup	Top scorer	
Season	P	W	D	L	F	A	GD	Pts	Pos	P	W	D	L	F	A	GD	Pts	Pos	English Cup	Chatham Cup	Name	Goals
2021	7	3	1	3	20	15	+5	10	5th	Did not qualify									2nd	R4	(New Zealand) Edward Wilkinson	7
2022	18	16	1	1	74	12	+62	49	1st	9	1	2	6	12	26	−14	5	9th	SF	R2	(New Zealand) Edward Wilkinson	19
2023	18	16	1	1	72	12	+60	49	1st	9	5	1	3	18	16	+2	16	3rd	W	W	(New Zealand) Sam Philip	32
2024	18	13	2	3	64	21	+43	41	3rd	Did not qualify									SF	R2	(New Zealand) Joel Stevens	19
2025	18	12	4	2	66	13	+53	40	2nd	10	4	2	4	16	19	−3	14	7th	SF	QF	(Japan) Shogo Osawa	16

== Honours ==
League

- New Zealand National Soccer League (6): 1973, 1975, 1978, 1987, 1988, 1991
- Southern League (2): 2022, 2023
- Mainland Premier League (1): 1998
- Canterbury Championship League (2): 2019, 2023 (Note: Won by Christchurch United U20 Academy)
- Canterbury Division 1 (2): 2008, 2014

Cup

- Chatham Cup (7): 1972, 1974, 1975, 1976, 1989, 1991, 2023
- English Cup (7): 1982, 1983, 1985, 1989, 1990, 1991, 2023

Other

- McFarlane Cup (Men's): 2019
- Mainland Football Men's Team of the Year: 2022, 2023
- Hurley Shield: 2024

== Notable players ==
A total of 44 players from Christchurch United have represented New Zealand at an international level, including two World Cup captains Steve Sumner and Ryan Nelsen.

During their successful run in the 1970s, many players from Christchurch United were called up to represent New Zealand on the international stage. Imported players that Christchurch United had signed from the United Kingdom and Australia were swiftly naturalised and became eligible to play for their adopted country. Club legends such as Ken France, Ian Park, Bobby Almond, and Steve Sumner all played for New Zealand, with Sumner captaining the team during their 1982 World Cup Campaign.

During the 1982 World Cup, seven players from Christchurch United competed against Brazil, Scotland, and the Soviet Union, with Steve Sumner scoring New Zealand's first ever World Cup goal against Scotland. Sumner remains Christchurch United's most prolific goal scorer for New Zealand, with 22 goals, and holds the record number of appearances at 105, with 58 full internationals.

In recent years, former Christchurch United icon Ryan Nelsen captained the unbeaten squad of the 2010 World Cup in South Africa, with draws against Paraguay, Slovakia, and defending world champions Italy. Nelsen was paired in defence with former Christchurch United defender Ben Sigmund.

The following former players have all represented New Zealand

- Ryan Nelsen
- Bobby Almond
- Keith Braithwaite
- Glen Collins
- Ceri Evans
- Graham Griffiths
- Danny Halligan
- Brian Hardman
- Alan Marley
- Iain Marshall
- Michael McGarry
- Ian Park
- Ben Sigmund
- Alan Stroud
- Steve Sumner
- Frank van Hattum
- Johan Verweij
- Steve Wooddin
- Phil Dando

Chatham Cup
Preceded by Western Suburbs	Winner; 1972 Chatham Cup	Succeeded by Mount Wellington
Preceded by Mount Wellington	Winner; 1974 Chatham Cup	Succeeded by Christchurch United
Preceded by Christchurch United	Winner; 1975 Chatham Cup	Succeeded by Christchurch United
Preceded by Christchurch United	Winner; 1976 Chatham Cup	Succeeded by Nelson United
Preceded by Waikato United	Winner; 1989 Chatham Cup	Succeeded by Mount Wellington
Preceded by Mount Wellington	Winner; 1991 Chatham Cup	Succeeded by Miramar Rangers
Preceded by Auckland City	Winner; 2023 Chatham Cup	Succeeded by Wellington Olympic
