= Jock Newall =

New Zealand footballer

Personal information
- Full name: John White Newall
- Date of birth: 21 July 1917
- Place of birth: Ayr, Scotland
- Date of death: 21 January 2004 (aged 86)
- Place of death: Dumfries and Galloway, Scotland
- Position: Striker

Senior career*
Years	Team	Apps	(Gls)
- Ayr United
- Petone

International career
1951–1952	New Zealand	10	(16)
- * Club domestic league appearances and goals

John White Newall (21 July 1917 – 21 January 2004) was an association football player who represented New Zealand at international level.

== Early career ==
Newall debuted professionally for his hometown club Ayr United before World War II interrupted his career. In 1950 he emigrated to New Zealand and joined Wellington club Petone.

== International career ==
Newall made his full All Whites debut, a 0–2 loss to New Caledonia on 19 September 1951 and ended his international playing career with 10 A-international caps and an incredible 16 goals to his credit. He scored 4 hat-tricks in official FIFA internationals, including a 4-goal haul in his final cap appearance, a 5–3 win over Tahiti on 28 September 1952. Including unofficial matches, Newall scored 28 goals in just 17 games for the All Whites, a record only exceeded only by Vaughan Coveny who scored 30, including 29 official international goals in 64 matches, and Chris Wood who scored 33 official international goals in 65 matches.

== Retirement ==
Newall retired with asthma after the 1953 season and later returned to Scotland.

Newall died on 21 January 2004 in Dumfries and Galloway, at the age of 86.
