= Roy Coxon =

New Zealand footballer

Personal information
- Full name: Roy E Coxon
- Place of birth: England
- Position: Striker

Senior career*
Years	Team	Apps	(Gls)
- Hospital

International career
1951–1952	New Zealand	8	(10)
- * Club domestic league appearances and goals

Roy Coxon is a former association football player who represented New Zealand at international level.

Coxon made his full All Whites debut in a 0–2 loss to New Caledonia on 19 September 1952 and ended his international playing career with eight A-international caps to his credit, scoring ten goals against Pacific nations. His final cap was an appearance in a 5–3 win over Tahiti on 28 September 1952.
