= Ivan Walsh =

New Zealand footballer and cricketer (1924–2005)

Personal information
- Full name: Ivan Alexander Walsh
- Date of birth: 29 December 1924
- Place of birth: Dunedin, New Zealand
- Date of death: 12 May 2005 (aged 80)
- Place of death: Dunedin, New Zealand
- Position: Forward

Senior career*
Years	Team	Apps	(Gls)
- Northern AFC

International career
1951	New Zealand	4	(4)
- * Club domestic league appearances and goals

Ivan Alexander Walsh (29 December 1924 – 12 May 2005) was an association football player who represented New Zealand at international level as a forward. He was also a first-class cricketer.

== Football career ==
Walsh was born in 1924 at Dunedin and was educated at the Christian Brothers School there. He played soccer for Northern AFC in the city and by 1948 was playing for the Otago representative side.

Walsh scored on his full New Zealand debut in a 6–4 win over New Caledonia on 22 September 1951 and ended his international playing career with four official A-international caps and four goals to his credit, scoring a hat-trick in his final appearance, a 9–0 win over New Hebrides on 4 October 1951.

== Cricket career ==
Ivan Walsh
Cricket information
- Batting: Right-handed
- Bowling: Right-arm medium
- Role: Bowler

Domestic team information
- Years: Team
- 1948/49–1949/50: Otago

Career statistics
Competition	First-class
Matches	3
Runs scored	2
Batting average	1.00
100s/50s	0/0
Top score	2*
Balls bowled	665
Wickets	8
Bowling average	33.75
5 wickets in innings	0
10 wickets in match	0
Best bowling	5/76
Catches/stumpings	3/–
- Source: Cricinfo, 4 June 2024

Walsh also played cricket at a representative level. A right-arm medium paced bowler, he played for the North East Valley club in Dunedin alongside his brother Brian. Considered "one of the most promising medium-paced bowlers" that Otago had "had for some years" with "exceptional promise", he played three times for Otago in the Plunket Shield. He made his debut for the side in January 1949, opening the bowling and taking seven wickets, including a five-wicket haul in the first innings, against Wellington at Carisbrook.

The Otago Daily Times felt that he was the "find of the match" and it was expected that he would become one of the "mainstays" of the Otago side in future seasons. After taking seven wickets against Southland in a non-first-class match in December 1949, Walsh was included in the Otago side for the season's Shield matches in 1949–50. He played in the first two matches but took only one wicket and was left out of the side for the final Shield match of the season against Canterbury. He was not selected in the Otago practice squad later in the season and did not regain his place in the side in future seasons.

== Later life ==
Walsh worked as a teacher. He died at Dunedin in 2005 aged 80. Obituaries were published in the 2005 New Zealand Cricket Almanack and in the 2006 edition of Wisden Cricketers' Almanack.
