= George McLaren (New Zealand footballer) =

New Zealand footballer

Personal information
- Full name: George S McLaren
- Place of birth: New Zealand

Senior career*
Years	Team	Apps	(Gls)
- Western

International career
1958	New Zealand	3	(1)
- * Club domestic league appearances and goals

George McLaren is a former association footballer who represented New Zealand at international level.

McLaren played three official A-international matches for New Zealand in 1958, the first a 2–2 draw with trans-Tasman neighbours Australia on 23 August 1958. His other two matches were consecutive 2-1 wins over New Caledonia on 31 August and 7 September respectively, McLaren scoring in the first of those games.
