= Ted Cook (footballer) =

New Zealand footballer

Personal information
- Full name: Edward Cook
- Date of birth: 26 June 1901
- Place of birth: Tarbock, Lancashire, England
- Date of death: 27 February 1957 (aged 55)
- Place of death: Houston, Texas, USA
- Position: Forward

Senior career*
Years	Team	Apps	(Gls)
- Southland Corinthians

International career
1922	New Zealand	3	(4)
- * Club domestic league appearances and goals

Ted Cook (1901–1957) was an association football player who represented New Zealand, playing in New Zealand's first ever official international.

Cook made his full All Whites debut in New Zealand's inaugural A-international fixture and had the distinction of scoring New Zealand's first goal, scoring a brace in that game, with Bill Knott scoring the other in a 3–1 win over Australia on 17 June 1922. He played in all three of New Zealand's internationals in June that year, scoring in each game for a total of three A-international caps and four goals.

Following his football career, Ted immigrated to Australia where he went on to be the General Manager of the Commercial Bank of Australia from<History of and Australian Institution 1866-1981 the Commercial Bank of Australia> 1953–1957.
