= Brian Hardman =

New Zealand footballer

Personal information
- Full name: Brian Hardman
- Place of birth: Bolton, England
- Position: Left midfielder

Senior career*
Years	Team	Apps	(Gls)
- Christchurch United

International career
1971–1973	New Zealand	9	(1)
Medal record
Men's association football
Representing New Zealand
OFC Nations Cup
Winner	1973 New Zealand
- * Club domestic league appearances and goals

Brian Hardman is a former association football player who represented New Zealand at international level.

Hardman made his full All Whites debut in a 2–4 loss to New Caledonia on 18 July 1971 and ended his international playing career with 9 A-international caps and 1 goal to his credit, his final cap an appearance in a 0–1 loss to Indonesia on 18 March 1975.

== Honours ==
New Zealand

- OFC Nations Cup: 1973
