= Ken Fleet =

New Zealand footballer

Personal information
- Full name: W Kenneth Fleet
- Place of birth: New Zealand
- Position: Midfielder

Senior career*
Years	Team	Apps	(Gls)
ante 1951–post 1955	Eastern Suburbs		

International career
1951	New Zealand	6	(3)
- * Club domestic league appearances and goals

Ken Fleet is a former association football player who represented New Zealand at international level.

Fleet made his full All Whites debut in a 0-2 loss to New Caledonia on 19 September 1951 and ended his international playing career with six A-international caps and three goals to his credit, his final cap an appearance in a 6-4 win over Fiji on 7 October 1951.
