= Bill Knott (footballer) =

New Zealand footballer

Personal information
- Full name: William Knott

Senior career*
Years	Team	Apps	(Gls)
- Northcote

International career
1922	New Zealand	1	(1)
- * Club domestic league appearances and goals

William Knott was an association football player who represented New Zealand, playing in New Zealand's first ever official international.

Knott scored in New Zealand's inaugural A-international fixture, with Ted Cook scoring a brace as New Zealand beat Australia 3–1 on 17 June 1922. It was his only appearance in official internationals.
