= Gisborne City AFC =

New Zealand association football club

Gisborne City
- Full name: Gisborne City Association Football Club
- Nickname: Sky Blues
- Founded: 1939 as Eastern Union
- Dissolved: 2014
- Ground: Childers Road Reserve
- Capacity: 1655
Home colours	Away colours

Gisborne City Association Football Club was a New Zealand association football club based in Gisborne, New Zealand. Founded in 1939 as Eastern Union, the club was a founding member of the New Zealand National Soccer League in 1970 and won the National League championship in 1984, the NZFA Challenge Trophy in 1984, and the Chatham Cup in 1987.

Founded as Eastern Union, the club won fourteen consecutive Poverty Bay Championship titles between 1953 and 1966 before winning the Central Districts League in 1967 and adopting the Gisborne City name in 1968.

Five Gisborne City players were selected for New Zealand's 1982 FIFA World Cup squad in Spain.

== History ==
Chart of yearly ladder positions for Gisborne City in NZ 1st division soccer

Founded as Eastern Union in 1939, the club’s earliest known records include a team selection published in the ‘‘Gisborne Herald’’ on 18 August 1939. The lineup included future New Zealand international Ernie Bridge, alongside players such as Jock Gordon, Jim Wilson, Reg Bardwell, Ron Johnstone, Alf Flavell, Rowan Barbour, Jim Burns and Dick Cook.

The earliest known match report for the club, then known as Eastern Union, dates from July 1939, when they secured a 1–1 draw against Territorials in the Poverty Bay Football Association's senior competition.

Several players named in early Eastern Union records also appear in a surviving 1939 team photograph held by Tairāwhiti Museum, which identifies Bridge as a New Zealand player.

During the 1950s and 1960s, Eastern Union became a leading football club in Poverty Bay. The club won fourteen consecutive Poverty Bay Championship titles between 1953 and 1966, and contemporary coverage described it as attracting players from the British Isles, including Scottish professional Bert Ormond.

During the 1950s, Eastern Union developed a recruitment strategy aimed at attracting footballers from the United Kingdom. According to journalist Bob Pearce, local businessman Ron Johnstone advertised in Britain with the promise of employment, football opportunities and Gisborne's sunny climate. The approach helped attract a number of British players to the club and contributed to Eastern Union's emergence as a leading force in Poverty Bay football.

The club also attracted several former British international footballers during the 1950s. Among them were former England international Ken Armstrong and former Scotland international Jock Aird, who were identified as Eastern Union's star players during the club's 1957 Chatham Cup campaign. Armstrong had previously been a member of Chelsea's 1954–55 First Division title-winning side, while Aird had represented Scotland at the 1954 FIFA World Cup before emigrating to New Zealand.

As Eastern Union, the club competed in the Chatham Cup from the early 1950s and reached the semi-final, also serving as the North Island Final, in 1957, losing 3–1 to eventual champions Seatoun.

In 1964, Eastern Union players Alan Sefton and Trevor Pugh were selected for New Zealand's international world tour. Contemporary coverage identified the pair as Gisborne's representatives in the touring squad and members of the Eastern Union Soccer Club. The New Zealand team was captained by former Eastern Union and Thistle player Bert Ormond.

Eastern Union won the Central Districts League in 1967 before adopting the Gisborne City name in 1968.

=== National prominence (1980s) ===
In 1983, Childers Road Reserve hosted the Chatham Cup final between Gisborne City and Mount Wellington after the New Zealand Football Association selected Gisborne as the venue, stating that the decision was made "for the good of the game". Contemporary programme material noted that Childers Road regularly attracted crowds of around 3,000 for National League matches, while football writer Vic Deverill wrote that Gisborne was "an area that has done so much for New Zealand soccer over the years".

The following year, Gisborne City became the first club from outside Auckland, Wellington and Christchurch to win the National League.

=== Financial difficulties (1989) ===
By 1989, Gisborne City was experiencing both on-field and off-field difficulties in the National League. A season review recorded that the club suffered two 7–0 defeats and earned only three points from thirteen away fixtures. The same source stated that the off-field situation was "just as dire" and that the club was briefly suspended from the league because of its financial plight.

=== Revival efforts (2004–2007) ===
Following promotion to the Central League, Gisborne City embarked on an ambitious revival effort backed by businessman Kevin Whitley and the Emerald Group. Coached by former New Zealand manager Kevin Fallon, the club publicly targeted a return to national prominence and a strong Chatham Cup campaign.

The club recruited a number of notable players during this period, including Keryn Jordan and former New Zealand international Noah Hickey. Contemporary media reports described Gisborne City as one of the competition's "big spenders", with a reported first-team budget of $250,000 for the 2005 season.

The revival project attracted national attention through the purchase of a Jetstream 32 aircraft, which was used to assist team travel. Court proceedings later revealed that the aircraft had been purchased for $883,000 through a financing arrangement intended to offset costs through commercial charter operations when not being used by the football club. The aircraft subsequently failed to generate the projected cash surplus, leading to loan defaults and legal proceedings involving companies associated with Whitley.

Following his death in 2018, Geoff Logan, a long-serving Gisborne City committee member, local football supporter and co-founder of Sunshine Brewery, was commemorated through the establishment of the Geoff Logan Memorial Tournament. Contemporary reports described Logan as a Gisborne City stalwart who regularly supported local football initiatives, representative teams and activities at Childers Road Reserve. The tournament was created to recognise his contribution to football in Gisborne and has involved clubs from across the district, including Gisborne City.

=== Dissolution ===
In 2014, the club's incorporated society, Gisborne City Association Football Club Incorporated (No. 214434), was formally dissolved. The New Zealand Gazette recorded that the Registrar of Incorporated Societies was satisfied that the society was no longer carrying on its operations.

== FIFA World Cup contribution ==
Five Gisborne City players were selected in New Zealand’s squad for the 1982 FIFA World Cup in Spain.

The players were Brian Turner, John Hill, Keith Mackay, Kenny Cresswell and Grant Turner.

Grant Turner, described by FIFA as a "Gisborne City youngster", scored a decisive goal in New Zealand’s 2–0 victory over Australia during the qualification campaign. He was later ruled out of the World Cup finals after suffering a foot injury shortly before the tournament.

Of the five Gisborne City players selected for New Zealand's 1982 FIFA World Cup squad, three – Keith Mackay, Brian Turner and Grant Turner – also featured on Panini's 1982 FIFA World Cup sticker set as part of the New Zealand team subset.

== Club identity ==
During the early 1970s, under player-coach Alan Vest, Gisborne City adopted a sky blue kit reminiscent of English club Coventry City and adopted Blue Is the Colour as its team song, co-opted from the Chelsea original.

Former Gisborne City player Maurice Tillotson described Vest's arrival in 1971 as "just the tonic we needed", citing his personality and knowledge of the game as influences on the team both on and off the pitch.

During Vest's three seasons as coach, Gisborne City consolidated its place in the National League in 1971 and 1972, before finishing fourth in 1973, one point behind the second- and third-placed teams.

== Honours ==
=== National ===
- New Zealand National Soccer League
  - Champions (1): 1984
  - Runners-up (3): 1980, 1985, 1987
- Chatham Cup
  - Champions (1): 1987
  - Runners-up (2): 1983, 1984
- New Zealand Challenge Trophy
  - Champions (1): 1985
  - Runners-up (1): 1981
- Air New Zealand Cup
  - Champions (1): 1984
  - Runners-up (2): 1974, 1976

=== Regional ===
- Central Districts League
  - Champions (1): 1967 (as Eastern Union)
- Central League Division One
  - Champions (1): 1979

=== Local ===
- Poverty Bay Championship
  - Champions (14): 1953, 1954, 1955, 1956, 1957, 1958, 1959, 1960, 1961, 1962, 1963, 1964, 1965, 1966 (as Eastern Union)

== Records ==
Gisborne City's record league victory is an 11–0 win over Moturoa in 2003, and its record cup win is a 10–1 victory against Feilding United in 2007.

The club's heaviest league defeats are 7–0 losses to Mt Wellington and Waterside Karori, both in 1989, while its record cup defeat is an 8–2 loss to Marist Palmerston North in 2008.

== AFC Bournemouth tour ==
In May 1982, English club AFC Bournemouth visited New Zealand as part of an eight-match tour shortly after winning promotion to the Third Division of the English Football League. One of the tour fixtures was played against Gisborne City at Childers Road Reserve on 27 May 1982, with Bournemouth winning 4–0 in front of a crowd of 900 spectators.

Gisborne City’s lineup included John Hill, Keith Mackay, Grant Turner and Brian Turner. New Zealand international Ricki Herbert appeared as a guest player, while the team was coached by Kevin Fallon.

The match formed part of AFC Bournemouth’s wider tour of New Zealand, during which the English club played eight matches, winning seven and losing one.

== Notable players ==
The following players represented Gisborne City AFC or its predecessor club, Eastern Union, and have standalone Wikipedia articles.

- Tony Moynihan
- Ken Dugdale
- Kenny Cresswell
- John Hill
- Keith Mackay
- Brian Turner
- Grant Turner
- Jock Aird
- Ken Armstrong
- Bert Ormond
- Iain Gillies
- Kevin Fallon
- Ross Nicholson
- Colin Walker
- Alan Vest
- Malcolm Bland
- Phil Alexander
- Kevin Meacock
- Paul McLoughlin
- Maurice Tillotson
- Ray Veall
- Steve Sumner
- Noah Hickey
- Terry McCavana
- Danny Robinson
- Ray McCoy
- Brian Strutt
- Kevin Birch
- Sean Byrne
- Paul Nixon
- Ernie Bridge

Chatham Cup
Preceded by North Shore United	Chatham Cup Winner; 1987	Succeeded by Waikato United
