= Wellington United AFC =

Wellington United
- Full name: Wellington United AFC
- Nickname: Diamonds
- Founded: 1986 (amalgamation)
- Ground: Newtown Park
- League: Capital 1
- 2026: Capital 1, 8th of 10
Home colours	Away colours

Wellington United AFC is an association football club based in Wellington, New Zealand, that competes in the Capital 1, the 5th tier of New Zealand football.

== History ==
Chart of yearly ladder positions for Wellington United in NZ 1st division soccer

=== Wellington Diamond United ===
Wellington Diamond United was the result of the merger of Diamond and Zealandia/Wellington United in 1968.

Diamond was founded as a junior football club in 1893 by members of the Star Rugby Club, who wished to play football. It became a senior team in 1895.

Zealandia was founded in 1954 by Dutch immigrants, changing its name to Wellington United in 1964.

In 1968 the club played in the Central Region's Division One, finishing fourth out ten. The club made it to the National League for the 1973 season but at the end of the following season they found themselves back in Division One.

Wellington Diamond United won the National League in 1976, 1981 and 1985.

=== Hungaria and Wellington City ===
Hungaria was formed in 1962 by Hungarian immigrants. The club played in the Central Region league before being invited to join the first New Zealand National Soccer League in 1970. The team finished seventh out of eight that season, winning just three games. It was the club's only season in the National League as they forfeited their place to form a composite entry with Miramar Rangers, to be known as Wellington City, for the 1971 and 1972 seasons. Miramar withdrew after the 1971 season.

In 1973 the club went solo again, this time in Division Two of the Central League (finishing second) with Wellington City as an independent entity. The following season the club topped the table, winning promotion to Division One. The club remained there until the end of the 1977 season when they finished bottom of the ten-team division to be relegated back to Division Two. The club had two unsuccessful seasons in Division Two before merging with Wellington City permanently in 1979.

=== Wellington United ===
Wellington Diamond United and Wellington City merged in 1986 to form Wellington City Diamond United, which soon shortened its name to Wellington United.

In January 2015 Wellington United announced a strategic partnership with Wellington Phoenix. The partnership has the academy and Premiers ( ISPS Handa Premiership ) able to play through the winter in the Central League as Wellington United.

== New Zealand Representatives ==
- Julius Beck (Hungaria)
- Grahame Bilby (Wellington City)
- Paul Cameron (Wellington City)
- Malcolm Dunford (Wellington Diamond United)
- Don Finlayson (Wellington Diamond United)
- Bill Harris (Wellington Diamond United)
- Imre Kiss (Hungaria)
- Eric Lesbirel (Wellington Diamond United)
- Istvan Nemet (Hungaria)
- Garry Paddison (Wellington Diamond United)
- John Raat (Diamond)
- Wynton Rufer (Wellington Diamond United)
- Jeff Strom (Wellington Diamond United)
- Grant Turner
- Garry Welch (Wellington Diamond United)

== Honours ==
Kate Sheppard Cup
Preceded by 2020 Competition cancelled due COVID-19; 2019 Eastern Suburbs	Winner; 2021 Kate Sheppard Cup	Succeeded by Auckland United
