= Vanguard (disambiguation) =

The vanguard is the leading part of an advancing military formation.

Vanguard may also refer to:

== Military ==
=== China ===
- Chengdu J-10 "Vanguard", a 4.5-generation Chinese fighter plane
- QW-1 Vanguard, an advanced Chinese surface-to-air missile

=== United Kingdom ===
- Vanguard-class ship of the line, a class of warship deployed during the 19th century by the Royal Navy
- Vanguard-class submarine, the Royal Navy's current nuclear ballistic missile submarines
- HMS Vanguard, several British Royal Navy ships

=== United States ===
- Vultee P-66 Vanguard, an American fighter plane built from 1939 to 1943
- 297th Military Intelligence Battalion of the US Army, nicknamed "Vanguard"
- HM-14, a navy helicopter squadron, nicknamed "Vanguard"
- 18th Infantry Regiment of the US Army, nicknamed "Vanguards"
- 76th Fighter Squadron of the US Air Force, nicknamed "Vanguards"
- VX-4, a defunct US Navy squadron; early nickname "Vanguards"

=== Other countries ===
- Operation Vanguard, Ghana
- No. 110 Helicopter Unit, IAF, India, nicknamed "Vanguards"
- Vanguard-class multirole warship, a proposed Norwegian class
- 1st Brigade of the 2nd Marine Division (South Korea), nicknamed "Vanguard"
- 52nd Marine Vanguard Regiment of the Tunisian Navy
- 308th Infantry Division, Vietnam, nicknamed Quân Tiên Phong (Vanguard)

== Businesses and brands ==
- Vanguard Airlines, a defunct American airline that operated from 1994 to 2002
- Vanguard Automotive Group, an American car rental company
- Vanguard Cellular, an American cellular phone company acquired by AT&T in 1999
- Vanguard Dutch Marine, a Netherlands-based yacht manufacturing company
- Vanguard Healthcare, a British medical company
- Vanguard Health Systems, an American operator of hospitals and other medical facilities
- Vanguard Industries, an American manufacturer of military badges
- Vanguard International Semiconductor Corporation, an IC foundry in Taiwan founded in 1994
- Vanguard Managed Solutions, an American company (2001–2007) of which part is now Vanguard Networks
- Vanguard Sailboats, an American builder of racing and recreational sailboats
- The Vanguard Group, an American investment management company founded in 1975
- China Resources Vanguard, one of the largest supermarket chain companies in Hong Kong
- Vanguard, a 1970s American running shoe made by Brooks Sports
- Vanguard, a former American cigarette made by Brown & Williamson
- Vanguard, a 1960s Eversharp fountain pen made in England
- Vanguard, a line of Swiss watches made by Franck Muller
- Vanguard, a former cigarette made by John Player & Sons
- Vanguard, a line of Swiss watches made by Roamer
- Vanguard, a mid-twentieth century American lighter made by Ronson
- Vanguard, a line of American pocket watches made by the Waltham Watch Company
- Vanguard, a 1960s Italian-made Waterman fountain pen
- Vanguard, an American line of sporting rifles made by Weatherby
- Vanguard Knife, a hunting knife made by the American company Buck Knives
- Vanguard 888, a mid-twentieth century American radio made by Emerson

== Education ==
=== Canada ===
- Vanguard College, a private Christian college in Edmonton, Alberta
- Vanguard School (Quebec), a private high school in Montreal, Quebec

=== New Zealand ===
- Vanguard Military School, a charter school in Auckland

=== United States ===
- Vanguard College Preparatory School, a private high school in Waco, Texas
- Vanguard High School, a public high school in Ocala, Florida
- Vanguard School (Illinois), a public high school in Arlington Heights, Illinois
- Vanguard University of Southern California, a private Christian university in Costa Mesa, California
- The Vanguard School (Colorado), a public K-12 charter school in Colorado Springs, Colorado
- Vanguard School (Florida), a private boarding high school in Lake Wales, Florida
- The Vanguard School (Pennsylvania), a private school in Malvern, Pennsylvania
- Vanguard School of Coconut Grove, a private day school in Coconut Grove, Florida
- Carnegie Vanguard High School, a public magnet high school in Houston, Texas

== Arts, entertainment and media ==
=== Film and television ===
- Vanguard Animation, an American production studio
- Vanguard Films, a defunct American film production company
- Vanguard Films, a defunct Philippine film production company
- Vanguard (film), a 2020 Chinese action film
- News Vanguard, an Indian TV channel
- Vanguard (TV series), a journalistic reporting series on Current TV

=== Music ===
- Vanguard (synthesizer), a software synthesizer developed by reFX
- Vanguard Records, an independent record label founded in 1950
- The Vanguards, a 1960s Norwegian rock band
- Santa Clara Vanguard Drum and Bugle Corps, a competitive drum and bugle corps, based in Santa Clara, California
- Vanguard -of the muses-, an album by Japanese band Exist Trace
- "Vanguard", a single by Violet Chachki from her 2015 EP Gagged

=== Publications ===
- Vanguard (journal), published by the anarchist Vanguard Group
- Vanguard (Nigeria) (Daily Vanguard), a daily newspaper based in Lagos, Nigeria
- Vanguard (magazine), a defunct Canadian magazine
- Vanguard Press, a publishing label now owned by Random House
- Portland State Vanguard (formerly Daily Vanguard), the student newspaper at Portland State University
- Vanguard, student newspaper of the University of South Alabama in Mobile, Alabama
- The Vanguard, the student weekly of Bentley University, Waltham, Massachusetts
- The Vanguard (Bentley University), a student newspaper at Bentley University
- The Vanguard (Buckingham Browne & Nichols), a student newspaper at Buckingham Browne & Nichols
- Vanguard, official press organ of hardline, a radical deep ecology movement
- The Vanguard (1915, 1920), socialist anti-war newspaper founded by John Maclean
- The Vanguard (1922–28), a publication of the émigré Communist Party of India, founded and edited by Manabendra Nath Roy
- The Vanguard (January–March 1853), a short-lived socialist paper published by George Julian Harney
- The Vanguard (1996–2001), a Vancouver, Washington alternative newspaper, some former staff of which would found The Vancouver Voice

=== Comics and anime ===
- Vanguard (Image Comics), a superhero from Megaton Comics and Image Comics
- Vanguard (Marvel Comics), a name shared by a mutant Russian character as well as a fictional team of characters
- Vanguard, a high-tech humanoid robot in the anime Vandread
- Cardfight!! Vanguard an anime series, based on the trading card game

=== Games and toys ===
- Vanguard (video game), a 1981 shooter game, with the 1984 sequel Vanguard II
- Vanguard: Saga of Heroes, a 2007 MMORPG created by Sigil Games Online and Sony Online Entertainment
- Medal of Honor: Vanguard, a first-person shooter game created by Electronic Arts for PlayStation 2 and Wii
- Cardfight!! Vanguard a trading card game
- Vanguard, an organization in the computer game The Longest Journey
- Vanguard, a faction in the video game, Destiny
- Vanguard, the droid partner of the Transformers toy Sideswipe
- Vanguard, a variant of the collectible card game Magic: The Gathering
- Vanguard, the main battle tank used by the New Conglomerate in PlanetSide and PlanetSide 2
- Vanguard, a character class in the video game, Mass Effect, Mass Effect 2, and Mass Effect 3
- Vanguard, a UN-funded military organisation in the City of Heroes universe
- Vanguard, a group of characters in the video game Tales of Symphonia: Dawn of the New World
- Vanguard, a demon (opponent) in the game, Demon's Souls
- Vanguard, a character class in the video game, Chivalry: Medieval Warfare
- Vanguard, the highest rank in Spiral Knights
- Vanguards, a line of die-cast model cars made by Lledo, now owned by British company Corgi
- Call of Duty: Vanguard, a 2021 installment of the Call of Duty franchise
- Vanguard, an in-development first-person shooter game developed by CCP Games
- UC Vanguard, a faction in the video game Starfield
- Vanguard, a type of hero class in the 2024 hero shooter Marvel Rivals
- Riot Vanguard, a kernel-level anti-cheat software developed by Riot Games

=== Other arts, entertainment and media ===
- Vanguard Radio Network, a Philippine radio network
- Star Trek: Vanguard, a series of novels about a space station called Vanguard
- The Vanguard, a painting which was the basis of the design of Western Cattle in Storm, an American stamp
- The Vanguard, a boys' story paper published in the 1920s by D. C. Thomson & Co.

== Organizations ==
- Vanguard (organization), a defunct American LGBT rights organization
- Vanguard Public Foundation, a defunct American social justice foundation
- U.P. Vanguard, alumni association of the University of the Philippines ROTC

== Politics ==
- Vanguardism, a concept in Leninism
- Vanguard, a former name of the Russian Unity party of Ukraine
- Vanguard Group (anarchist), an American anarchist group in the 1930s
- Vanguard Unionist Progressive Party, a unionist political party in Northern Ireland during the 1970s
- Vanguard Organization, a secret unit of the Arab Socialist Union (Egypt) during the presidency of Gamal Abdel Nasser and Anwar Sadat

== Sports ==
- Vegas Vanguards, a hockey team in the Professional Women's Hockey League
- LGU Vanguards, a defunct Philippine basketball team in the UNTV Cup league
- Nueva Ecija Rice Vanguards, a Philippine professional basketball team
- Vanguard (American racehorse)
- Vanguard (steeplechaser), winner of the 1835 Grand National
- Vanguard Volley Hitters, a Philippine volleyball team of the Spikers' Turf volleyball league

== Science and technology ==
- Project Vanguard, an American satellite launch project begun in 1957
  - Vanguard (rocket), a launch vehicle used in Project Vanguard
  - Vanguard TV3, the first satellite launch attempt in 1957
  - Vanguard 1, an artificial satellite launched in 1958
  - Vanguard 2, an artificial satellite launched in 1959
  - Vanguard 3, an artificial satellite launched in 1959
- Vanguard (microkernel), a discontinued experimental microkernel developed at Apple Computer

== Transportation ==
=== Aviation ===
- Vickers Vanguard, a British short/medium-range turboprop airliner (first flown 1959)
- Vickers Type 170 Vanguard, a 1920s British airliner
- Briggs & Stratton Vanguard Big Block V-Twin, a series of piston engines, adapted to propel ultralights

=== Automobiles ===
- Standard Vanguard, a car produced by the British Standard Motor Company from 1947 to 1963
- Toyota Vanguard, a Japanese compact crossover sport utility vehicle

=== Ships and boats ===
- BOKA Vanguard, the largest heavy lift ship ever built
- ST Vanguard, a 250 GRT tugboat formerly the Empire ship named Empire Pine
- USNS Mission San Fernando (T-AO-122), renamed USNS Vanguard in 1965 for role as tracking vessel
- Vanguard 15, one-design racing dinghy made by Vanguard Sailboats

== Other uses ==
- Vanguard, Saskatchewan, Canada, a village
- Ulmus 'Morton Plainsman', an elm cultivar sold under the trade name Vanguard

== See also ==
- Daniel Vangarde, French songwriter and producer
- The Vanguard (disambiguation)
- Vanguard Award (disambiguation)
- La Vanguardia ("The Vanguard"), a Spanish newspaper founded in 1881
- La Vanguardia (Argentina) ("The Vanguard"), an Argentinian newspaper founded in 1894
