= Vanguard School =

Vanguard School may refer to:

== Canada ==
- Vanguard College, a private Christian college in Edmonton, Alberta, Canada
- Vanguard School (Quebec), a private high school in Montreal, Quebec, Canada

== New Zealand ==
- Vanguard Military School, a charter school in Auckland, New Zealand

== United States ==
- Vanguard College Preparatory School, a private high school in Waco, Texas, U.S.
- Vanguard High School, a public high school in Ocala, Florida, U.S.
- Vanguard School (Illinois), a public high school in Arlington Heights, Illinois, U.S.
- Vanguard University of Southern California, a private Christian university in Costa Mesa, California, U.S.
- The Vanguard School (Colorado), a public K-12 charter school in Colorado Springs, Colorado, U.S.
- Vanguard School (Florida), a private boarding high school in Lake Wales, Florida, U.S.
- The Vanguard School (Pennsylvania), a private school in Malvern, Pennsylvania, U.S.
- Vanguard School of Coconut Grove, a private day school in Coconut Grove, Florida, U.S.
- Carnegie Vanguard High School, a public magnet high school in Houston, Texas, U.S.
