= HMS Vanguard =

Eleven ships of the Royal Navy have borne the name HMS Vanguard, meaning the forefront of an action or movement:

- English ship Vanguard (1586) was a 31-gun galleon launched in 1586, rebuilt twice and was broken up in 1630, with some parts being reused in the next HMS Vanguard.
- English ship Vanguard (1631) was a 56-gun second rate launched in 1631, active in the Anglo-Dutch Wars, and scuttled in 1667.
- HMS Vanguard (1678) was a 90-gun three-decker second-rate launched in 1678, sunk in 1703 but raised in 1704, rebuilt twice and renamed HMS Duke in 1728. She was broken up in 1769.
- HMS Vanguard (1748) was a 70-gun third rate launched in 1748 and sold in 1774.
- HMS Vanguard (1780) was a 4-gun gunvessel captured in 1780, purchased in 1781 and sold in 1783.
- HMS Vanguard (1787) was a 74-gun third rate launched in 1787. She became a prison ship in 1812, a powder hulk in 1814 and was broken up in 1821.
- HMS Vanguard (1835) was a 78-gun third rate launched in 1835, renamed HMS Ajax in 1867, and broken up in 1875.
- HMS Vanguard (1869) was an Audacious-class ironclad battleship launched in 1869 and sunk in a collision with HMS Iron Duke in 1875.
- HMS Vanguard (1909) was a St Vincent-class battleship launched in 1909 and sunk in an explosion in 1917.
- HMS Vanguard (23) was a unique battleship, the only one of her class. She was launched in 1944 and broken up in 1960.
- HMS Vanguard (S28) is a Vanguard-class ballistic missile submarine launched in 1992 and currently in service.

== Battle honours ==
- Armada, 1588
- Cadiz, 1596
- Portland, 1653
- Gabbard, 1653
- Scheveningen, 1653
- Lowestoft, 1665
- Four Days' Battle, 1666
- Orfordness, 1666
- Barfleur, 1692
- Louisburg, 1758
- Quebec, 1759
- Martinique, 1762
- Nile, 1798
- Syria, 1840
- Jutland, 1916

== See also ==
- Vanguard class for ship classes
- Vanguard (disambiguation)
