= HMS Audacious (1869) =

British lead ship of Audacious-class

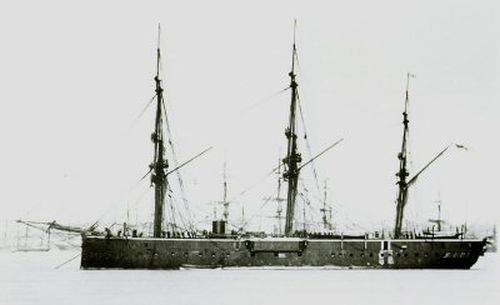
- Audacious in 1870

History

United Kingdom
- Name: Audacious
- Ordered: 29 April 1867
- Builder: Robert Napier, Govan
- Cost: £256,291
- Laid down: 26 June 1867
- Launched: 27 February 1869
- Completed: 10 September 1870
- Commissioned: October 1870
- Decommissioned: 1894
- Renamed: Fisgard in 1904; Imperieuse in 1914
- Reclassified: Depot ship, 1902; Training ship, 1906; Receiving ship, 1914; Storeship, 1920
- Fate: Sold for scrap, 15 March 1927

General characteristics
- Class & type: Audacious-class ironclad
- Displacement: 6,034 long tons (6,131 t)
- Length: 280 ft (85.3 m)
- Beam: 54 ft (16.5 m)
- Draught: 23 ft (7.0 m)
- Installed power: 4,021 ihp (2,998 kW)
- Propulsion: 1 shaft, 1 horizontal return connecting rod steam engine
- Sail plan: ship rigged
- Speed: 12 knots (22 km/h; 14 mph)
- Range: 1,260 nmi (2,330 km; 1,450 mi) at 10 kn (19 km/h; 12 mph)
- Complement: 450
- Armament: 10 × 9-inch rifled muzzle-loading guns; 4 × rifled muzzle-loading 64-pounder guns
- Armour: Belt: 6–8 in (152–203 mm); Bulkheads: 4–5 in (102–127 mm); Battery: 4–6 in (102–152 mm)

HMS Audacious was the lead ship of the Audacious-class ironclads built for the Royal Navy in the late 1860s. They were designed as second-class ironclads suitable for use on foreign stations and the ship spent the bulk of her career on the China Station. She was decommissioned in 1894 and hulked in 1902 for use as a training ship. The ship was towed to Scapa Flow after the beginning of the First World War to be used as a receiving ship and then to Rosyth after the war ended. Audacious was sold for scrap in 1929.

== Design and description ==
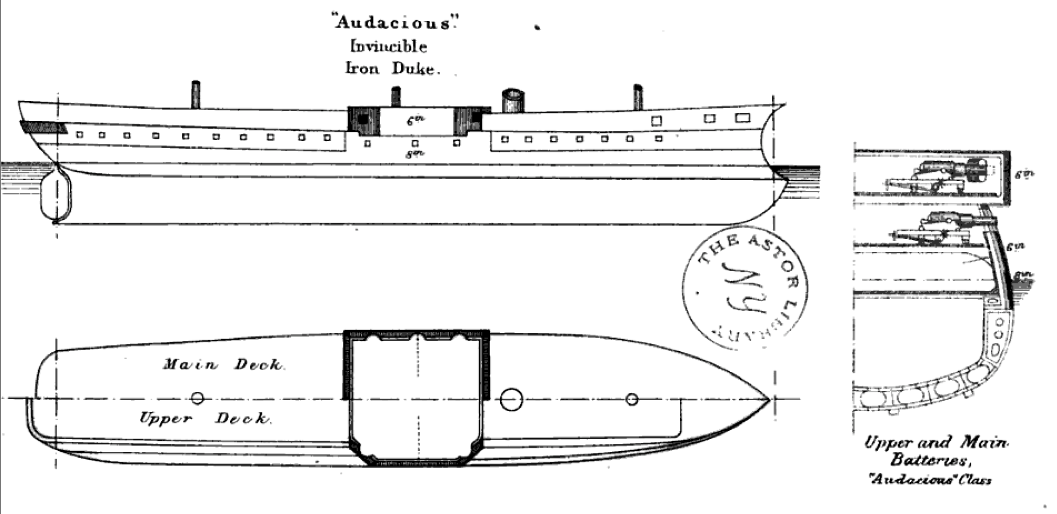
Right elevation, plan and cross-section of the Audacious-class ironclads

The Audacious-class ironclads were laid out as central battery ironclads with the armament concentrated amidships. They were the first British ironclads to have a two-deck battery with the upper deck guns sponsoned out over the sides of the hull. The ships were fitted with a short, plough-shaped ram and their crew numbered 450 officers and men.

HMS Audacious was 280 feet (85.3 m) long between perpendiculars. She had a beam of 54 feet (16.5 m) and a draught of 23 feet (7.0 m). The ship was first British ironclad to be completed below her designed displacement; this meant that she was top heavy and required 360 long tons (370 t) of cement ballast to raise her metacentric height. Audacious, and her sisters, were the steadiest gun platforms among the large British ironclads of their era. Audacious was given an experimental zinc sheath for her hull in an attempt to reduce biofouling that proved unsuccessful.

=== Propulsion ===
Audacious had two 2-cylinder horizontal return connecting rod steam engines made by Ravenhill, each driving a single 16-foot-2-inch (4.9 m) propeller. The bronze four-bladed Mangin propellers were not arranged in the usual radial cross shape, but rather in two pairs, one behind the other, on an elongated boss in an attempt to reduce their drag when the ship used her sails. They were later replaced by two-bladed Griffiths propellers. Six rectangular boilers provided steam to the engine at a working pressure of 31 psi (214 kPa; 2 kgf/cm^{2}). The engines produced a total of 4,021 indicated horsepower (2,998 kW) during sea trials on 21 October 1870 and Audacious reached a maximum speed of 12.83 knots (23.76 km/h; 14.76 mph). The ship carried 460 long tons (470 t) of coal, enough to steam 1,260 nautical miles (2,330 km; 1,450 mi) at 10 knots (19 km/h; 12 mph).

The Audacious-class ironclads were initially ship rigged and had a sail area of 25,054 square feet (2,328 m^{2}). After the loss of HMS Captain in a storm in 1870, the ships were modified with a barque rig which reduced their sail area to 23,700 square feet (2,202 m^{2}). They were slow under sail, only 6.5 knots (12.0 km/h; 7.5 mph), partly due to the drag of the twin screws, and their shallow draft and flat bottom meant that they were leewardly when close-hauled. The three ships, Audacious, Vanguard, and Invincible, with balanced rudders were described as unmanageable under sail alone.

=== Armament ===
HMS Audacious was armed with ten 9-inch and four 64-pounder rifled muzzle-loading guns. Six of the 9-inch (229 mm) guns were mounted on the main deck, three on each side, while the other four guns were fitted above them on the upper deck. Their gun ports were in each corner of the upper battery and could be worked in all weathers, unlike like the guns on the main deck below them. The 64-pounder guns were mounted on the upper deck, outside the battery, as chase guns. The ship also had six 20-pounder Armstrong guns for use as saluting guns.

The shell of the 14-calibre 9-inch gun weighed 254 pounds (115.2 kg) while the gun itself weighed 12 long tons (12 t). It had a muzzle velocity of 1,420 ft/s (430 m/s) and was credited with the ability to penetrate a nominal 11.3 inches (287 mm) of wrought iron armour at the muzzle. The 16-calibre 64-pounder gun weighed 3.2 long tons (3.3 t) and fired a 6.3-inch (160 mm), 64-pound (29.0 kg) shell that had a muzzle velocity of 1,125 ft/s (343 m/s).

In 1878 Audacious received four 14-inch (356 mm) torpedo launchers that were carried on the main deck, outside the armoured battery. When the ship was refitted in 1889–90 she received eight 4-inch breech-loading guns as well as four quick-firing 6-pounder Hotchkiss and six 3-pounder Hotchkiss guns for defence against torpedo boats.

=== Armour ===
Audacious had a complete waterline belt of wrought iron that was 8 inches (203 mm) thick amidships and tapered to 6 inches (152 mm) thick at the bow and stern. It only protected the main deck and reached 3 feet (1 m) above the waterline at full load and 5 feet (1.5 m) below. The guns were protected by a section of 8-inch armour, 59 feet (18.0 m) long, with a 5-inch (127 mm) transverse bulkhead forward and a 8-inch (203 mm) bulkhead to the rear. The armour was backed by 8–10 inches (200–250 mm) of teak. The total weight of her armour was 924 long tons (939 t).

== Service ==
HMS Audacious was ordered on 29 April 1867 from Robert Napier in Govan, Glasgow. She was laid down on 26 June 1867 and launched on 27 February 1869 in a gale. The winds caught the rear of the ship as she was about halfway down the slipway and twisted her enough that some plates and frames of her bottom were damaged. The ship was completed on 10 September 1870 and commissioned the following month. She cost £256,291 to build.

Upon completion she became guard ship of the First Reserve at Kingstown, Ireland (modern Dún Laoghaire), but was transferred the following year to Hull where she remained until 1874. The ship was ordered to the Far East that year to serve as the flagship for the China Station under the flag of Vice-Admiral Sir Alfred Phillips Ryder. Despite the presence of escorting tugs, Audacious grounded twice while she was transiting through the Suez Canal. She relieved her sister Iron Duke in Singapore, and later collided with a merchant ship during a typhoon in Yokohama. Iron Duke relieved her in turn in 1878. Audacious returned to her previous post in Hull in 1879, relieving HMS Endymion. She served there until she began a lengthy refit which included new boilers and the addition of a poop deck.

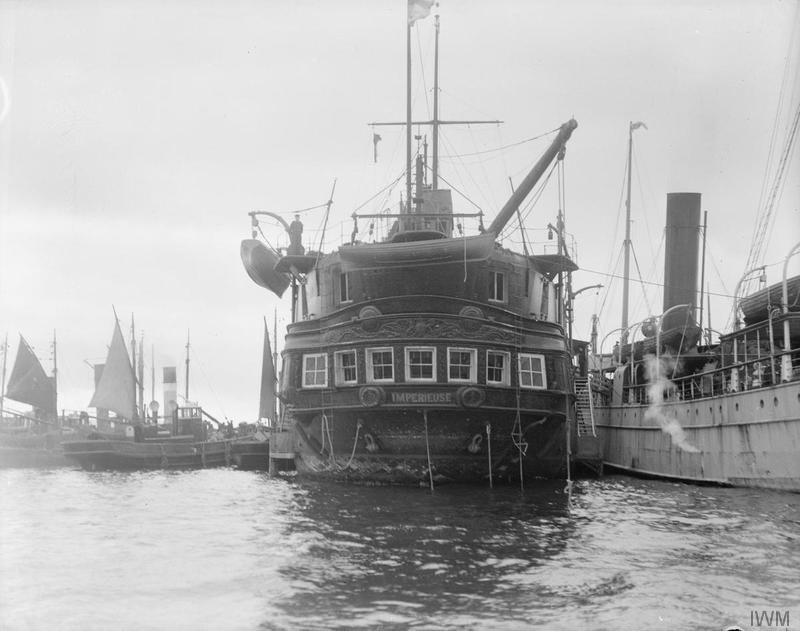
In use as a mail depot ship at Scapa Flow

The ship's refit was complete in March 1883 and she again relieved Iron Duke as flagship of the China Station later that year. Audacious remained there until 1889 when she returned to Chatham where she was refitted, rearmed and replaced her masts and rigging with simple pole masts fitted with fighting tops. Upon the completion of her refit in 1890 she returned to Hull for the third time until the ship was decommissioned in 1894. Audacious was relegated to 4th class reserve until her engines were removed and she was converted to an unpropelled depot ship in 1902. She was commissioned at Chatham on 16 July 1902 by Captain Henry Loftus Tottenham as torpedo depot ship at that port. She transferred to Felixstowe early the following year, and acted as depot ship for destroyers in the Eastern district until 1905, when she paid off; in April 1904 she had been renamed Fisgard (after the French translation of the Welsh town Fishguard). In 1906, she was recommissioned as part of the four-ship Fisgard boy artificers training establishment at Portsmouth. The ship was towed to Scapa Flow in 1914 after the start of the First World War to be used as a receiving ship and was renamed Imperieuse. On 13 January 1915, the auxiliary minesweeper HMS Roedean was driven onto Imperieuse in Scapa Flow off Hoy, Orkney Islands; Rodean sank due to damage she suffered in the collision. In 1919, Imperieuse was to be renamed Victorious, but the renaming was cancelled. She was towed from Scapa to Rosyth on 31 March 1920, where she remained as store ship until 15 March 1927, when she was sold to Thos. W. Ward of Inverkeithing for scrap.
