= Nick Hyde =

New Zealand footballer (born 1975)

Personal information
- Full name: Nicholas Wayne Hyde
- Date of birth: 27 June 1975 (age 51)
- Place of birth: Auckland, New Zealand
- Position: Defender

Youth career
- East Coast Bays
- Wimbledon

Senior career*
Years	Team	Apps	(Gls)
1993–2001	Uni-Mount Wellington		
2001	DPMM	0	(0)
2002	North Shore United		(3)
2002	DPMM	0	(0)
2003–2004	East Coast Bays		
2004–2005	Napier City		(1)
2005	East Coast Bays		
2005–2006	Auckland City	14	(0)
2007–2011	East Coast Bays		

International career^{‡}
1992	New Zealand U17		
- * Club domestic league appearances and goals as of 15 May 2025 ‡ National team caps and goals as of 15 May 2025

Nicholas Wayne Hyde (born 27 June 1975) or more commonly known as Nick Hyde is a New Zealand former footballer who played as a defender. A one-time Oceania Club Championship winner with Auckland City, his football career was predominantly spent in the domestic league system. After his football career ended, he serves as founder and chairperson of Vanguard Military School.

== Football career ==
Hyde played his junior football at East Coast Bays AFC and experienced youth international football with the national under-17s there. He also had a spell at Wimbledon in England before transferring to Uni-Mount Wellington of the New Zealand Superclub League in 1993. He played modestly in his formative years in the top tier of the New Zealand leagues, coming closest to silverware twice; scoring in the Chatham Cup final in a defeat to Waitakere City in 1996, and in 2000 when his team went to the final of the Ansett National Club Championship and lost to Napier City on penalties.

A year later, Hyde trialed for newly-established club DPMM FC of Brunei and was chosen to play for them at an invitational tournament where he went up against the likes of BEC-Tero Sasana of Thailand, Selangor of Malaysia and Happy Valley AA of Hong Kong. After a spell at North Shore United in the 2002 New Zealand National Soccer League, he was back with DPMM for the third edition of the same invitational tournament and this time his club went all the way to the final. His goal in the 42nd minute against BEC-Tero Sasana sealed DPMM's victory, paving the club to gain more honours in Brunei's new domestic competition namely the B-League later that year and beyond.

Hyde joined his local club East Coast Bays playing in the third tier in 2003 and helped them win promotion to the 2004 Northern League. He moved to Napier City for the inaugural New Zealand Football Championship but returned to East Coast Bays at the season's end.

Hyde was snapped up by league champions Auckland City at the start of the 2005–06 season and successfully defended the league title, winning on penalties against Canterbury United in the play-off final. His team also won the 2006 OFC Club Championship after a 3–1 win against AS Pirae of Tahiti courtesy of a Keryn Jordan hat-trick.

Afterwards, Hyde finally settled at his hometown club East Coast Bays, winning the second tier of the New Zealand football pyramid three times in a row as well as the Chatham Cup in 2008.

== Post-football career ==
Hyde founded Vanguard Military School in 2014, having immense experience as well as family background in education management, and is currently the chairman of the establishment.

== Honours ==
Uni-Mount Wellington

- Chatham Cup: 1996 (runners-up)
- National Club Championship: 2000 (runners-up)

DPMM

- DPMM Invitational Cup: 2002
- Brunei Invitational Cup: 2002

East Coast Bays

- NRFL Championship: 2003
- US1 Premiership: 2008, 2009
- NRFL Premier League: 2010
- Chatham Cup: 2008

Auckland City

- New Zealand Football Championship: 2005–06
- Oceania Club Championship: 2006
