= 2001 New Zealand National Soccer League =

New Zealand National Soccer League
- Season: 2001
- Champions: Central United

The 2001 New Zealand National Club Championship, also known, due to naming-rights sponsorship, as the Qantas National Club Championship was the second season of a nationwide club competition in New Zealand football. The competition was won by Central United.

The league was played during winter, with matches played from April to September, and was run in two stages. In the first stage, each team in the ten-team league played every other team home and away. In the second stage, the top four teams entered a knockout competition, with third place playing fourth place in one match and first playing second in the other, with home advantage being decided by final league position. The winners of the first against second match progressed straight through to the final; the losers of that match met the winners of the other match to decide the other finalist.

The bonus point system used during the 2000 season was not used for the 2001 and subsequent seasons.

== Promotion and relegation ==
Ten teams took part in the 2001 league. Eight of these remained from the previous season. Nelson Suburbs withdrew from the competition, and Metro were relegated and had to play in a play-off series with the winners of a competition between the northern, central, and southern regional competition winners for a place in the 2001 league. The play-off games between the three regional champions were played at Palmerston North during September 2000; the match between Metro and the winner of this series was played the following month at North Shore as the curtain-raiser to the 2000 league final.

Team 1	Score	Team 2
Caversham	3 – 3	Havelock North Wanderers
Tauranga City	1 – 3	Caversham
Havelock North Wanderers	1 – 4	Tauranga City
Metro	3– 2	Caversham

Metro thus retained their league place. Controversially, when Nelson Suburbs withdrew from the league, their place was offered not to Caversham, but to Tauranga City United, a new team formed by the merger of Tauranga City and Mount Maunganui.

Metro again finished last in 2001, but withdrew from the play-off series with the winners of the northern, central, and southern regional leagues.

== League table ==
Pos	Team	Pld	W	D	L	GF	GA	GD	Pts	Qualification or relegation
1	Miramar Rangers	18	13	4	1	53	24	+29	43	Qualified for Finals
2	Central United (C)	18	10	5	3	49	27	+22	35	Qualified for Finals
3	Red Sox Manawatu	18	11	1	6	37	28	+9	34	Qualified for Finals
4	University-Mount Wellington	18	10	4	4	30	24	+6	34	Qualified for Finals
5	Napier City Rovers	18	8	4	6	41	41	0	28	
6	Waitakere City	18	7	4	7	46	37	+9	25	
7	Tauranga City United	18	6	2	10	33	39	−6	20	
8	Dunedin Technical	18	6	2	10	32	40	−8	20	
9	Woolston Technical	18	2	5	11	21	39	−18	11	
10	Metro (R)	18	1	1	16	15	58	−43	4	Relegated to the 2002 Northern Zone

Rules for classification: 1) points; 2) goal difference; 3) number of goals scored.
(C) Champions; (R) Relegated

== Finals ==
=== Bracket ===
Upper semifinal
Miramar Rangers	1
Central United	0
Lower semifinal
Manawatu	4
University-Mount Wellington	0

Preliminary final
2	Central United	5
3	Manawatu	2

Grand final
1	Miramar Rangers	2
2	Central United	3

=== Play-offs ===
19 August 2001

Miramar Rangers	1 – 0	Central United
Brown

19 August 2001

Manawatu	4 – 0	University-Mount Wellington
Eaton, Field, Sandbrook, Lochhead

26 August 2001

Central United	5 – 2	Manawatu
Ridenton ×3, Aliaga, Eie		Jeremy Brown, Cunniliffe

=== Final ===
3 September 2001

Miramar Rangers	2 – 3	Central United
Brown ×2		Eie ×3

North Harbour Stadium, North Shore City
Referee: Bruce Grimshaw

== Records and statistics ==
Biggest winning margin

- Central United 7, Dunedin Technical 0
- Dunedin Technical 8, Napier City Rovers 1

Highest aggregate score

- Dunedin Technical 8, Napier City Rovers 1
- Miramar Rangers 6, Napier City Rovers 3
