= ESY =

Esy or ESY may refer to:

- Esy Morales, Puerto Rican musician
- Edible Schoolyard
- Extended School Year
- ESY (Greek: Εθνικό Σύστημα Υγείας, ΕΣΥ), the National Healthcare Service in Greece
