= Practice Makes Perfect (disambiguation) =

Practice Makes Perfect is an American educational organization.

Practice Makes Perfect may also refer to:

- Practice (learning method)
- "Practice Makes Perfect" (song), by Wire from the 1978 album Chairs Missing
- "Practice Makes Perfect", by Kidsongs from the 1987 video The Wonderful World of Sports
- Doc Martin: Practice Makes Perfect, a novelisation of the television series Doc Martin
- "Practice Makes Perfect" (Doctors), a 2002 television episode
- "Practice Makes Perfect" (Tales of the Jedi), a 2022 television episode
