= Vanguard class =

Vanguard class may refer to:

- Vanguard-class ship of the line, UK Royal Navy 19th-century second rate tall ship class
- Vanguard-class battleship, UK Royal Navy World War II era super-battleship class
- Vanguard-class submarine, UK Royal Navy post-Cold-War era ballistic missile submarine class
- Vanguard-class multirole warship, Royal Norwegian Navy cancelled proposed ship class
- "Vanguard" class of locomotives, built by Thomas Hill (manufacturer)

== See also ==
- HMS Vanguard, British Royal Navy shipname
- Vanguard (disambiguation)
