= NSLA =

NSLA may refer to:

- National and State Libraries Australia
- National Summer Learning Association
