= 2000 New Zealand National Soccer League =

New Zealand National Soccer League
- Season: 2000
- Champions: Napier City Rovers

The 2000 New Zealand National Club Championship, also known, due to naming-rights sponsorship, as the Ansett National Club Championship was the inaugural season of a nationwide club competition in New Zealand football. It replaced the 1999 New Zealand island soccer leagues and was a re-formed version of the national soccer league which had been run from 1970 to 1992. The competition was won by Napier City Rovers.

The league was played during winter, with matches played from March to August, and was run in two stages. In the first stage, each team in the ten-team league played every other team home and away. In the second stage, the top four teams entered a knockout competition, with second place playing third place in one match and first playing fourth in the other, with home advantage being decided by final league position. The winners of these two semi-finals then contested the national final.

A non-standard points allocation system was used in the 2000 league. Although three points were awarded for a win, one for a draw and none for a loss, a bonus point was also awarded if a team scored four or more goals in a match. This bonus point system was abandoned before the 2001 league season.

== Promotion and relegation ==
Ten teams took part in the 2000 league. These were the seven highest-ranked teams from the 1999 North Island Soccer League and the three highest-ranked teams from the 1999 South Island Soccer League.

Two new teams took part who had not been part of the 1999 season. University-Mount Wellington were a team formed from the merger of the Auckland University and Mount Wellington teams and Christchurch City was a similar merger between Woolston WMC and Christchurch Technical. City only lasted two seasons before reverting to its two founding clubs. Note: They should not be confused with the earlier Christchurch City AFC who merged with other teams in 1970 to form Christchurch United.

Nelson Suburbs withdrew at the end of the 2000 season, and Metro, who finished last, took place in a play-off series with the winners of the northern, central, and southern regional leagues.

== League table ==
Pos	Team	Pld	W	D	L	GF	GA	GD	BP	Pts	Qualification or relegation
1	University-Mount Wellington	18	11	4	3	35	22	+13	2	39	Qualified for Finals
2	Napier City Rovers (C)	18	9	4	5	37	20	+17	4	35	Qualified for Finals and OFC Club Championship
3	Dunedin Technical	18	8	3	7	32	26	+6	2	29	Qualified for Finals
4	Red Sox Manawatu	18	8	3	7	31	28	+3	1	28	Qualified for Finals
5	Waitakere City	18	7	3	8	37	34	+3	2	26	
6	Central United	18	7	2	9	29	28	+1	3	26	
7	Nelson Suburbs (Note: Nelson Suburbs withdrew at the end of the season) (R)	18	6	6	6	32	37	−5	2	26	Relegated to the 2001 Southern Zone
8	Miramar Rangers	18	6	5	7	28	33	−5	1	24	
9	Woolston Technical	18	4	6	8	23	35	−12	1	19	
10	Metro	18	5	2	11	23	44	−21	1	18	

Rules for classification: 1) points; 2) goal difference; 3) number of goals scored.
(C) Champions; (R) Relegated

== Finals ==
=== Semi-finals ===
27 August 2000

Napier City Rovers	2 – 2 (aet)*	Dunedin Technical
Jackson, Birnie		Burgess, Boyle

Park Island, Napier
27 August 2000

University-Mount Wellington	3 – 0	Manawatu
Buhagiar, Harris, Campbell

* Napier City Rovers beat Dunedin Technical on penalties (4–3). However, the rules for the competition decreed that the game should have been decided on the golden goal rule in extra time. The referee was unaware of this rule and allowed play to continue after Dunedin Technical took the lead. Given that either team could claim victory (one by the rules as enforced and one by the rules as they should have been enforced), a replay was ordered.

==== Replay ====
31 August 2000

Napier City Rovers	3 – 0	Dunedin Technical
McIvor, Akers, Pilcher

Park Island, Napier

=== Final ===
3 September 2000

University-Mount Wellington	0 – 0 (aet)*	Napier City Rovers

North Harbour Stadium, North Shore City
Referee: Brian Precious

* Napier won 4–2 on penalties

== Records and statistics ==
Top scorers

- 15 goals - Commins Menapi (Nelson Suburbs)
- 14 goals - Aaron Burgess (Dunedin Technical)
- 8 goals - Martin Akers (Napier City Rovers); Graham Green (Metro)
- 7 goals - Leon Birnie (Napier City Rovers); Chris McIvor (Napier City Rovers); Tim Stevens (Waitakere City); Mads Svenstrup (Dunedin Technical)

Biggest winning margin and highest aggregate score

- Metro 1, Waitakere City 9
