= Summer learning loss =

Loss of academic skills and knowledge over the course of summer vacation

Summer learning loss or summer slide, is the loss of academic skills and knowledge over the course of summer vacation in countries that have lengthy breaks in the school year, such as the United States and Canada. Schools see evidence of this because students are often given a standardised test prior to the summer break and again when they return to school in the autumn.

Research studies produce different results as to the extent of the loss, however they all appear to agree that the loss in learning varies across age and grade, subject matter, and family income and socioeconomic status.

In 2017, one review of the research in the United States concluded that:

- On average, students lost one month of learning over the summer months.
- Students lost more of their math ability than their reading ability.
- Students in higher grades lost more of their learning in general than those in lower grades.
- Students from low-income households lost reading ability, but students in middle- and high-income households gained some.
- There was no difference in loss or gain based on gender or race in either math or reading.

There is, however, some evidence that losses in learning over summer break can be relatively easily recovered.

== Gap and summer learning loss ==
=== Mathematics ===
Students score lower on standardised maths tests at the end of the summer, as compared to their own performance on the same tests at the beginning of summer. This loss was most acute in factual and procedural learning such as mathematical computation, where an average setback of more than two months of grade-level equivalency was observed among both middle- and lower-class students.

=== Reading ===
In reading and language, substantial differences were found between middle-class and lower-class students. Whereas middle-class students showed a non-significant gain in reading scores, lower-class students showed a significant loss that represented a gap of about three months of grade-level equivalent reading skills between middle- and lower-class students.

These results are consistent with other researchers' findings that a family's socioeconomic status affects children's achievement scores almost exclusively when school is closed. Barbara Heyns' 1978 study of 2,978 sixth- and seventh-graders in the Atlanta city public schools was the first thorough investigation of summer learning. Heyns found that while poor children and black children came close to keeping up with middle-class children in cognitive growth when school was in session, they lagged far behind during the summer.

In 1982, researchers Doris Entwistle and Karl Alexander extended Barbara Heyns' line of research through the Beginning School Study, which compared the school-year and summer achievement gains of 790 youths across 20 of Baltimore's public schools from the beginning of first grade in 1982 through the end of elementary school and tracked these students' progress through high school and college. They found that in year nine, the low-socioeconomic status group's reading comprehension average lagged 73 points behind the high-status group's on the California Achievement Test (CAT-V). About a third of the 73 points' difference (27 points) was in place when the students started first grade. After the first grade, the low-status students fall further behind each year, with the gap reaching a plateau of around 70 points in the 5th grade. The remaining two-thirds of the 73 point gap accumulate over the course of the elementary and middle school years, with 48.5 points being attributed to the cumulative summer learning gap from the five elementary years.

Researchers from The Ohio State University extended summer learning gap research further by conducting a national study of 17,000 kindergarten and first grade children from the Early Childhood Longitudinal Study. The authors confirmed earlier findings of an unequal starting point, showing that a standard deviation's advantage in socioeconmic status predicts a 1.77 month advantage in initial reading skill on the first day of kindergarten. The authors also confirmed that the socioeconomic status achievement gap continues to grow after schooling starts, with summer learning accounting for the vast majority of the difference. While the average kindergarten learning rate was 1.65 test points per month, a standard deviation's advantage in socioeconomic status predicted a relative gain of 0.16 points per month during summer, 0.07 points per month during kindergarten, and 0.05 points per month during first grade.

== Magnitude ==
In the United States, roughly 48 million children are enrolled in K-12 public schools, only 9.2 percent of which attend summer school programs. These summer school programs typically differ significantly from the regular school program in terms of curriculum, goals and rigor. Because summer school programs are voluntary, self-selection also confounds the effects of attendance. Due to these differences, most summer school programs have not been effective in reducing the achievement gap between youth of low and high socioeconomic status, and in some cases actually exacerbate the gaps.

The early learning gap among low-status students, which is predominantly driven by summer learning loss in the elementary school years, casts a long achievement shadow. When compared to high-status youth, the low-status youth are "more likely to enter adulthood without high school certification (36 percent versus 3 percent at age twenty-two) and less likely to attend a four-year college (7 percent versus 59 percent, also at age twenty-two)." The college wage premium (calculated as the ratio of the median hourly wage for those holding a bachelor's degree compared to the median hourly wage for those who have only completed high school) doubled from 1967 to 1997, while the dropout penalty similarly doubled. In an economy that is increasingly unaccommodating of low-skill workers, joblessness and declining wages are related to growth in ghetto poverty. In characterizing the U.S. poverty population, John Iceland revealed that "poor African-American children are less likely to escape poverty than others – 1 in 3 were still poor at ages 25 to 27, as compared to 1 in 12 white children."

=== Vulnerable learners ===
Cooper's 1996 study indicates that the gap in the learning cycle which occurs during summer vacation is more prominent for children that are less advantaged. Children who are the most susceptible are those from lower socioeconomic backgrounds, ethnic minorities and students with exceptionalities. Further, it is predominantly literacy related skills that are affected the most.

In a study conducted by Kim (2006), an intervention was designed to provide children with effective summer learning experiences and improve the reading abilities of minority students and struggling readers. Its results indicated that the most significant reading gains occurred for disadvantaged students while students from middle to high socio-economic upbringings remained stable on standardised measures of reading. However, these findings were not consistent with a 2010 review by Guryan and Kim, whereby a summer reading intervention was implemented for low-income Latino children. Low-income parents often lack the resources to provide children with sufficient reading materials needed to reinforce important literacy skills. Additional exposure to print material may be difficult for children in homes where English is not the native language.

High-achieving students are much less affected than others by the school year. High-achieving students maintain approximately the same steady rate of skill growth regardless of whether school is in session, whereas average students grow faster during the school year and plateau during the summer.

== Interventions ==
=== Summer programs ===
After-school activities and summer programs can play a role in combating summer learning loss. Studies indicate that students that are able to participate in organised academic activities during the summer months are less likely to experience losses in academic skills and knowledge before the start of the next school year.

For students, there are different kinds of summer programs available that provide different activities and enrichment for students focusing on decreasing the achievement gap by developing their reading and math skills through the summer. These types of programs focus on the student's ability to retain the knowledge they have gained through the academic year. While some do provide students with the same curriculum used in their academic school year, there are other approaches that either contribute more or less of a school-based curriculum for their programs.

Some programs focus on what type of help students need most and develop a customized learning plan. Other programs focus more on preparing students for the upcoming school year and the new concepts they will be learning. Some programs serve as transition programs to help students move from elementary school to middle school, and middle school to high school. There are also programs that just solely have activities that students can participate in without any instructional time dedicated to improving the skills of students. There are programs that are free or at a reduced cost so they are accessible to all students. Most of these free or reduced-cost programs serve students that are low-income, first-generation, or people of color.

While a large number of summer programs are held in-person, many summer programs allow students to participate while staying home. These are mainly centered around boosting reading skills. Inexpensive reading programs that reduce summer reading loss among low-income or at-risk students include giving kids books that interest them. While some programs produce good results, there is a concern that the results will not last unless at-risk students receive extra support during the school year. Studies have shown that summer programs are effective in improving students skills and helping students retain information. Most students have to attend summer programs for a few years in order for there to be a positive impact.

=== Parental involvement ===
Graham, McNamara and Van Lankveld (2011) conducted a summer literacy program to address specific literacy needs of young children, which also required the involvement of caregivers in program delivery. Children and caregivers attended literacy skill-building workshops where instructional sessions were tailored towards both of them and included a collaborative component. Based on the analysis of pre-test and post-test data collected during the study, children demonstrated significant improvements in developing their literacy skills.

Timmons (2008) also identifies the importance of providing literacy education to parents and children, while also bringing them together to work collaboratively in group situations. The active involvement of caregivers in their child's educational career only enhances academic achievement, as research indicates the significant influence that family involvement has on successful student outcomes. Effective summer reading programs provide families with meaningful strategies and resources that can be carried over and implemented in their home, which ensures continuity of summer reading programs throughout year, after the intervention has concluded.

== Canada ==
The Council of Ontario Directors of Education (CODE) published the results of their study entitled The Ontario Summer Literacy Learning Project 2010. Its purpose was to offer a summer literacy learning program to over 1,100 primary students in 28 Ontario Boards during the summer of 2010 and determine its effect.

The components of these programs varied widely (e.g. the total days from 8 to 29 and the total hours in a day from 3 to 7). Generally speaking, the programs slowed learning loss. However, nine of the English boards fell into two groups, those that gained literacy skills or those that closed literacy gaps. Of those nine, there was also a lot of variation in terms of the number of days (10 to 20 days), the total hours in a day (3 to 7.5 hours), the instructional hours (2 to 4 hours), and the recreational hours (0 to 4 hours). Despite this variance, the report concluded that, between the two groups, the number of days, hours of the program, and hours devoted to instruction or recreation, were not statistically significant.

Subsequently, in 2014 CODE published a Program Planning Guide to help Boards implement summer learning programs (SLP). After three years of delivering the SLP, they concluded that the programs a) make a difference for students experiencing literacy challenges, b) minimise summer learning losses, and c) in many cases, increase literacy achievements.

Some of the deliverables and expectations of the programs are:

- Students are in grades K-3
- Classes have no fewer than 15 students
- Programs offer a minimum of 45 hours of high quality and engaging literacy or numeracy instruction, and include a recreational component (e.g. physical activity, drama, art and music)
- Qualified teachers are employed to instruct the students.

In recent years, the project has included both French and English classes, and blended literacy, numeracy, robotics, coding, student mentors, Indigenous activities, and English language learning. In 2018, 10,000 students participated in Ontario, most programs were three weeks long and funding was allocated at $10,000 per class. Reports on the project can be found here.

== See also ==
- National Summer Learning Association
- Summer school
- Special education
- Summer camp
- Outdoor education
- Experiential learning
- Extended School Year
- Year-round school in the United States
- After-school activity
