= Charter schools in New Zealand =

School network in New Zealand

Charter schools in New Zealand, also known as partnership schools or kura hourua in te reo Māori, are schools that receive government funding similar to state schools but are subject to fewer rules and regulations from the Ministry of Education. They are free and open for any students to attend. Charter schools had the autonomy to set their own curriculum, qualifications, pay rates for teachers, school-hours and school terms. The schools are operated by sponsors such as Māori iwi, not-for-profit organisations, businesses or existing education providers.

Charter schools were legalised after an agreement between the National Party and their confidence and supply partner ACT New Zealand following the 2011 general election. In October 2012, the Education Amendment Bill creating charter schools passed with a five-vote majority. The charter school model was heavily criticized by a wide range of educational authorities, teacher organizations, the general public and political parties who vowed to overturn it. Opposition to charter schools formed part of the Labour Party's education policy in the 2014 and 2017 general elections.

In late October 2017, the newly formed Labour-led coalition government announced that it would be abolishing charter schools. This announcement triggered mixed responses. Teaching unions supported the new Government's decision, while charter schools and the opposition National and ACT parties opposed the announcement. In response to protests, Prime Minister Jacinda Ardern said that charter schools could convert to "special character" schools. By September 2018, all twelve remaining charter schools had successfully transitioned to become state-integrated schools.

On November 24, 2023, the newly formed National/ACT/NZ First coalition government made a pledge to reinstate charter schools in New Zealand, marking a shift in education policy direction. On 25 September 2024, the New Zealand Parliament passed legislation reestablishing charter schools.

== Context ==
In 1989, the Fourth Labour Government reformed the state (public) school system in what was known as the "Tomorrow's Schools" reforms. Blaming the amount of centralised bureaucracy for slipping school standards, the government disestablished the Department of Education, replacing it with the smaller Ministry of Education and moving the governance of state schools to their individual school communities. Since the Education Act 1877, the New Zealand public primary schooling system has been free and secular with provision for private religious schools. In 1935, secondary school education was made free by the First Labour Government. State schools are crown entities, meaning they are government-owned and retain the strong governmental and parliamentary oversight and control in common with other New Zealand crown entities. State schools are the most common in New Zealand.

Apart from the numerous state schools there are several variations on the Tomorrow's Schools model, the largest of which is state-integrated schools. State-integrated schools are parochial schools or private schools that have been "integrated" into the state school system under the Private Schools Conditional Integration Act 1975, usually because they have run into financial difficulty. These schools are run the same as state schools, but they are allowed to retain their special character. Proprietors of the school (e.g. the Catholic Church in the case of a Catholic school) own the integrated school facilities and sit on the school's board of trustees, but they do not receive government funds to maintain separation of church and state, and subsequently require parents to pay "attendance dues" for upkeep of the facilities. Kura Kaupapa schools are state-run schools with heavy emphasis on learning Māori language and culture but having most of the features of normal state schools. In addition there are fee-paying private schools which receive limited funding from the state. Most follow the national curriculum or internationally recognized variations.

== Legislative implementation ==
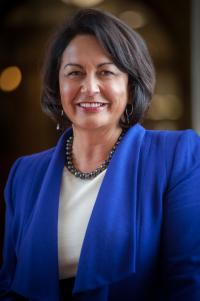
Education minister Hekia Parata introduced the partnership schools legislation in 2012.

Following the 2011 general election, the National Party, in return for confidence and supply, announced it would pick up an ACT party policy of setting up charter schools in southern Auckland and eastern Christchurch within three years. The government intended to set up charter schools as alternatives to state schools. Hekia Parata, the new education minister, would be responsible for their introduction. John Banks, the ACT leader, was made an associate minister of education and given responsibility for leading the work related to the development of potential charter schools.

The government's proposal was, like in other countries, charter schools would be operated by private businesses or organisations and would be directly accountable for performance to the organisations running them. The schools would receive state funding and private donations, but have the same freedoms as private schools in matters such as in setting the curriculum, length of the school year and teachers' pay. Teaching staff would also not have to be registered or even formally trained (although they would still require police clearance). Charter schools would still be subject to triennial external reviews by the Education Review Office, and the government would still have the power to intervene if there are serious problems, either taking over from the sponsor for a period of time or sacking them altogether. In the original proposal, unlike state schools, charter schools would not be subject to either Ombudsman scrutiny or the Official Information Act 1982.

The plan was heavily criticised by the opposition Labour and Green parties, and the main teachers' professional associations—the NZEI and the PPTA. Most of the opposition was over the idea of unregistered and untrained teachers having direct contact with students, and the lack of accountability through the Ombudsman and the Official Information Act. In April 2012, Massey University released a report highly critical of the proposed charter school model, claiming there was no international evidence to support claims that charter schools do better and all they would do is increase segregation.

The Education Amendment Bill to allow charter schools, rebranded as partnership schools or kura hourua, was introduced on 15 October 2012 and passed its first reading three days later 63 votes to 56. The bill was referred to the Education and Science select committee for closer scrutiny and public submissions, with the committee reporting back in April 2013 that the bill should proceed with amendments, including a change so that charter schools would be subject to Ombudsman scrutiny on matters relating to suspensions and expulsions (other than the Ombudsman, the only other way to appeal a suspension or expulsion is through the court system). After the report was released, United Future MP Peter Dunne announced he was pulling support for charter schools, leaving only the National, Act and Māori parties supporting the bill. The bill passed its third reading on 4 June 2013, 62 votes to 57.

During the select committee stage, the Labour Party announced that if elected to government at the 2014 general election, it would introduce provisions to require charter schools to employ registered teachers and make the schools fully accountable to the Ombudsmen and the Official Information Act. It would also not allow any new charter schools and would not guarantee future funding or integration to any existing schools, leaving them either to continue as private schools or close altogether. While Labour did not win the 2014 election, four Labour MPs were successful in having their member's bills related to charter schools selected for introduction between 2015 and 2017. Phil Goff's 2015 bill would have required charter schools to teach a "broad and balanced" curriculum; Chris Hipkins' 2016 bill proposed their abolition; Nanaia Mahuta's 2016 bill would have applied the Ombudsmen Act 1975 and Official Information Act 1982 to the charter school regime; David Clark's 2017 bill would have outlawed for-profit schools. The first three bills were defeated; the fourth was withdrawn after the change of government in 2017.

== Creation and operations ==
In September 2012, Minister of Education Hekia Parata announced that many schools in Christchurch would be closed or amalgamated, largely due to population changes and damaged facilities following the February 2011 earthquake. However, parents, teachers and students protested at the changes for going too far, and feared that the closures were being used as an excuse to start charter schools. In June 2013, the closed school sites were put up for sale, with charter schools and property development among the proposed uses.

Ahead of the passage of the Education Amendment Bill, an independent Partnership Schools Authorisation Board was established in March 2013 to evaluate applications for Partnership Schools and make recommendations to the Minister of Education on which applications should be considered for contract negotiations. Catherine Isaac, a former ACT Party president and candidate, was appointed as chair. The other initial members were former PriceWaterhouseCoopers chair John Shewan, Māori language advocate Dame Iritana Tawhiwhirangi, former Auckland Grammar headmaster John Morris, Margaret Southwick, Tahu Potiki and Terry Bates. The Board was also responsible for monitoring the educational performance and achievement progress of the Partnership Schools.

In May 2013, the PPTA published in its staff newsletter a list of 21 parties it believed were interested in the charter school programme, which included a high proportion of religious groups. While the Ministry of Education refused to release the full list of 36 interested parties, in July 2013, the Ombudsman overruled the Ministry and forced it to release the list as soon as possible. In September 2013, Parata and Banks announced that the first five charter schools would open in Auckland and Northland by the first term of 2014. These schools included the Vanguard Military School, the Māori secondary schools Te Kura Hourua o Whangarei Terenga Paraoa and Te Kura Hourua ki Whangaruru, The Rise UP Academy, and the Christian-oriented South Auckland Middle School.

In September 2014, the Northland-based Te Kura Hourua ki Whangaruru in Whangaruru attracted controversy over its poor leadership, high absenteeism of 20%, and mismanagement of government funds. The school, which received 500% more funding than a state school, spent half its income buying a farm. The Ministry of Education carried out a secret inquiry and immediately installed its own manager. One of the two original managers left hurriedly. Problems first arose in 2013 when it was claimed that the school had been set up in a paddock using portaloos for toilets. It was reported that drugs were a problem in the school and that some students had been removed to an unknown place. The school has only one teacher with a current practicing certificate. The original management was replaced by an executive manager from Child, Youth and Family. The school received $27,000 per student compared to $6,000 per student in a state school. In October 2015, the Ministry acknowledged that charter schools had been over-funded an extra $888,000 more than they would have been allocated had their funding been strictly based on their enrolments.

In May 2016, an independent partnership school support entity called E Tipu E Rea was established to provide support for existing and prospective charter school sponsors through a $500,000 conditional grant from the government. The new ACT leader David Seymour, who was appointed parliamentary undersecretary to the Minister of Education after the 2014 election and had been given responsibility for charter schools, claimed that this would bring NZ charter schools in line with overseas models such as England's New Schools Network and New York City's New York Charter School Centre. The Board was chaired by former EY Australasia CEO Rob McLeod. Other board members included former Māori Party co-leader Dame Tariana Turia, Dame Jenny Gibbs, former All Black La’auli Savae Michael Jones, Bruce Ritchie, and Kep Rapson. In August 2016, Seymour announced that two new Māori-oriented charter schools would be opening in Hamilton and Napier by 2017, adding to the eight that were already operating.

In May 2017, the consultancy firm Martin Jenkins published an independent report on behalf of the Ministry of Education praising most of the country's eight charter schools for helping Māori, Pacific Islander, and disadvantaged children. During the 2017 general election, the opposition Labour, Green, and New Zealand First parties announced that they would introduce legislation abolishing charter schools if elected into government. On 7 September, the National Government announced the creation of four new charter schools including a Christchurch outpost of the Auckland-based Vanguard Military School, a Māori-oriented junior high school, a bilingual Māori high school, and a STEM-oriented Auckland school.

=== List of former partnership schools ===
Between 2014 and 2017, the Partnership Schools Authorisation Board received 111 applications to open a partnership school over five years, of which 17 were approved.

As of September 2019, twelve charter schools had converted into state integrated or special character schools. These schools are listed below.

- Middle School West Auckland, sponsored by the Villa Education Trust, opened February 2015.
- Pacific Advance Senior School, Auckland, sponsored by the Pacific Peoples Advancement Trust, opened February 2015.
- South Auckland Middle School, sponsored by the Villa Education Trust, opened February 2014.
- Te Aratika Academy, Napier, sponsored by the Te Aratika Charitable Trust.
- Te Kura Hourua O Whangarei Terenga Paraoa, Whangārei, sponsored by the He Puna Marama Charitable Trust, opened February 2014.
- Te Kura Māori o Waatea, Auckland, sponsored by the Manukau Urban Māori Authority, opened February 2015.
- Te Kāpehu Whetū (Teina), Whangarei, sponsored by the He Puna Marama Charitable Trust, opened February 2015.
- Te Kōpuku High, Hamilton, sponsored by the Kia Ata Mai Educational Trust.
- The Rise UP Academy, Auckland, sponsored by The Rise UP Trust, opened February 2014.
- Vanguard Military School, Auckland, sponsored by the Advanced Trading Group Ltd., opened February 2014.
- Tūranga Tangata Rite, Gisborne.
- Waatea School, Auckland.

== 2018 Abolition and transition to state-integrated schools ==
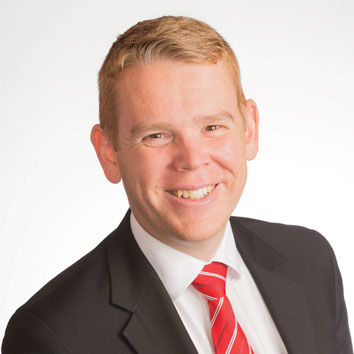
Partnership schools were abolished under Labour education minister Chris Hipkins.

Following the formation of a Labour-led coalition government in October 2017, the new education minister, Chris Hipkins, announced that the Government would be abolishing charter schools. In early 2018, the Labour-led Government introduced legislation blocking the creation of future charter schools while still allowing the existing 11 charter schools to continue operating while they negotiated options with the Ministry of Education. The Government's announcement was welcomed by the Post Primary Teachers' Association. By contrast, the announcement was criticized by charter schools, several parents, and the opposition National and ACT parties. The National Party's education spokesperson Nikki Kaye asked the Auditor-General to investigate potential conflicts of interest in the process of closing charter schools. However, the Auditor-General declined to conduct a formal inquiry.

On 11 February 2018, ACT leader David Seymour led a 150-strong protest in Central Auckland criticizing the Government's decision. Māori educators Sir Toby Curtis and Dame Iritana Tawhiwhirangi lodged a claim with the Waitangi Tribunal, arguing there was a lack of Māori inclusion in the decision to redesignate charter schools, and that lack of consultation breached the Crown's obligations under the Treaty of Waitangi. In response to criticism from parents and charter school advocates, Prime Minister Jacinda Ardern announced that charter schools could convert to "special character" schools to avoid closure; senior Māori MPs Kelvin Davis and Willie Jackson indicated that not all charter schools would shut. On 21 February the entire Partnership Schools Authorisation Board announced that it would be resigning in protest of the Government's approach to abolishing charter schools. On 5 March, charter school representatives including Villa Education Trust's academic advisor Alwyn Poole sought clarification from the Government on the deadline for charter schools to convert to "special character" schools. Education Ministry spokesperson Katrina Casey issued a statement confirming that 1 April 2018 would be the deadline for new schools but not existing schools.

On 2 April 2018, The New Zealand Herald newspaper reported that the Government had paid NZ$3.4 million to five proposed charter schools on the day that the Labour-led coalition government was sworn in on 26 October 2017. Education Minister Chris Hipkins acknowledged that his Government had paid the schools establishment grants since the Government was bound by contracts signed before the 2017 general election. None of these proposed schools have paid back the establishment grants since they are in the process of negotiating with the Government about reopening as state schools or integrated schools. It was also reported that terminating the contracts for the existing twelve charter schools and proposed five charter schools would generate compensation costs of up to NZ$1 million per school, amounting to an estimated total of NZ$16 million. These proposed schools included the science-oriented City Senior School in Auckland, Vanguard Military School's Christchurch branch, the Gisborne Māori high school Te Rūnanga o Tūranganui ā Kiwa, and Waatea High School.

By September 2018, all twelve existing charter schools had successfully transitioned into state integrated schools, ending New Zealand's charter school programme. The announcement was welcomed by Education Minister Hipkins but received a bitter-sweet response from charter school advocates and the opposition National and ACT parties. In late August 2018, the Villa Education Trust's Middle School West Auckland, South Auckland Middle School, and the independent Vanguard Military School were redesignated as special character state schools. The Mangere-based Te Kura Māori o Waatea, a proposed Waatea High School, and the proposed Tūranga Tangata Rite in Gisborne were designated as state integrated schools.

== 2024 revival ==
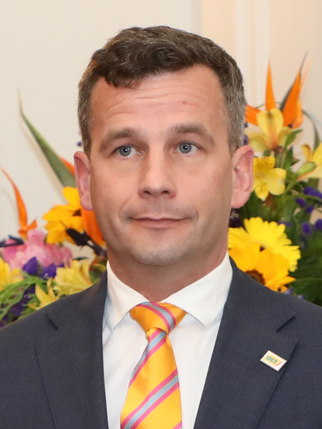
David Seymour, associate minister of education

Following the 2023 New Zealand general election, the newly formed National/ACT/NZ First coalition government pledged to reinstate charter schools in New Zealand.

On 3 April 2024, Associate Education Minister David Seymour created an eight-member Charter School/Kura Hourua Establishment Board to facilitate the reintroduction of charter schools. The Board is headed by St Cuthbert's College principal Justine Mahon, with other members including Glen Denham, John Fiso, Nina Hood, Neil Paviour-Smith, Rōpata Taylor, Doran Wyatt and Elizabeth Rata. The Board aimed to reestablish charter schools by the start of the 2025 school year.

On 14 May, Seymour announced that the Government would allocate NZ$153 million from the 2024 New Zealand budget to convert 35 state schools into charter schools and establish 15 new charter schools between 2025 and 2026, bringing the total number of charter schools to 50. Seymour said that the Government had received applications from several parties, including Tipene St Stephen's Māori boy's boarding school and AGE School. Labour's education spokesperson Jan Tinetti, Green education spokesperson Lawrence Xu-Nan, the New Zealand Educational Institute (NZEI) and the Post Primary Teachers' Association (PPTA) objected to the plans on the grounds that they would divert funding from overwhelmed state schools, allegedly placed "profits over kids," disadvantaged children with behavioural issues and disabilities, and that charter schools did not have to hire qualified teachers. By contrast, Innovative Education Consultants head consultant Alwyn Poole and St Stephen's School co-principal Nathan Durie welcomed the reintroduction of charter schools, saying that they would meet the needs of children and bring flexibility to the educational system.

In early August 2024, the New Zealand Council of Trade Unions expressed concern in its submission that the Government's charter school legislation would violate labour, human rights, and free trade provisions. Chief Ombudsman Peter Boshier expressed concern that charter schools would be excluded from the Official Information Act 1982. In addition, the Association for Research in Education argued that charter schools were not needed on the grounds that state schools had considerable autonomy. By 15 August, the Government had received 78 applications to set up charter schools. While ten were from state schools seeking to convert, the remaining 68 applications were from new schools requesting to set up. In response, Seymour claimed that this showed that educators were willing "to free themselves from the shackles of the state system."

On 25 September 2024, the New Zealand Parliament passed legislation reestablishing charter schools. While the bill was supported by the National, ACT and New Zealand First parties, it was opposed by the Labour and Green parties and Te Pāti Māori. On 27 November, Seymour announced that the first charter school, Mastery Schools New Zealand – Arapaki, a partner school of Mastery Schools Australia (MSA), would commence operations in the first term of 2025. On 5 December 2024, five new charter schools were announced, including Christchurch North College, the Busy School in Auckland, the French international school Ecole Francaise Internationale in Auckland, North West Creative Arts College in Auckland and the Māori language immersion Te Rito, Te Kura Taiao primary school in Kaitaia.

== 2025-26 expansions and developments ==
The first seven schools established under the revived charter school regime opened in February 2025. They were Mastery Schools New Zealand – Arapaki, Te Rito, Te Kura Taiao, Ecole Francaise Internationale Auckland, TIPENE, the BUSY School New Zealand, North West College and Christchurch North College.

A further group of charter schools opened in 2026. These included Aotearoa Infinite Academy, a nationwide distance secondary school; Altum Classical Academy in Wellington; Te Aratika High School in Hawke's Bay; Sisters United Academy in Auckland; and New Zealand Performance Academy Aotearoa in Upper Hutt.

On 20 July 2026, Te Whare Kounga opened in Wairoa, bringing the number of operating charter schools to 18. Government roll return data recorded 1,732 students enrolled across 17 charter schools on 1 July 2026.

On 12 October 2026, Pakaraka School in the Northland Region became the first state school to convert to a charter school. The school is run by the Society of Holistic Learners, a charitable trust led by school parents.

=== Kelston Boys' High School conversion proposal ===
In October 2025, a group called Bangerz Education and Wellbeing Trust (BEWT) applied to convert the state secondary school into a charter school. The proposal was not supported by the school's board or senior leadership. Acting Principal Daniel Samuela said the school's senior leaders and staff did not believe conversion was in the interests of its students or community.

The application drew attention to the provisions of the charter school regime allowing a conversion proposal to be initiated by one or more members of a state school community together with a prospective sponsor, rather than by the school's board itself. The Charter School Authorisation Board said it was nevertheless required to consider the level of support for the proposal before deciding whether to approve it.

BEWT withdraw the application in November 2025 before a decision was made. The school's board welcomed the withdrawal and said it hoped other schools would not experience a similar unsolicited proposal.

== List of charter schools ==
The first seven charter schools opened in February 2025: two in Christchurch, two in Auckland and one in Northland. An eighth school opened in Auckland in July 2025.

- Ēcole Française Internationale Auckland (Auckland French International School), bilingual primary school in Remuera, Auckland, opened February 2025.
- "TIPENE," Māori-oriented boarding high school in Bombay, South Auckland, sponsored by the St Stephen's Old Boys Association, the St Stephen's Queen Victoria Schools' Trust Board and Te Tuara Trust, opened February 2025.
- "Mastery Schools New Zealand – Arapaki" (MSNZ - Arapaki), special intervention primary school in Christchurch, sponsored by Mastery Schools Australia, opened February 2025.
- Te Rito, Te Kura Taiao, Māori immersion primary school for Years 1 to 8 students in Cable Bay, Northland, opened February 2025.
- "The BUSY School New Zealand," vocational high school for Years 11 to 13 students in Central Auckland, sponsored by The BUSY Group, opened February 2025.
- "North West College," coeducational creative arts-oriented high school for Years 7 to 9 students in West Auckland, opened February 2025.
- "Christchurch North College," specialist high school for Years 7 to 12 students in Burnside, Christchurch, sponsored by the Christchurch Education Trust, opened February 2025.
- "Twin Oaks Classical School," co-educational school for Years 1 to 9 students in Greenlane, Auckland, opened July 2025.
- "Aotearoa Infinite Academy," online distance learning school, opened Term 1 2026.
- "Te Aratika High School," vocational high school in Hawke's Bay targeting Māori and Pasifika, opened Term 1 2026.
- "Altum Academy," Classical-oriented school in Wellington targeting disadvantaged children, opened Term 1 2026.
- "New Zealand Performance Academy Aotearoa" (NZPAA), sports-oriented preparatory academy in Upper Hutt, opened Term 1 2026.
- "Sisters United Academy," Pasifika-oriented girls' high school in Auckland, sponsored by Sisters United, opened Term 1 2026.

=== Future charter schools ===
- "Autism NZ Education Hub," specialist school for neurodivergent children with campuses in Auckland and Wellington, opens Term 3 2026.

== See also ==
- Education in New Zealand
- History of education in New Zealand
