= Practice Makes Perfect =

Summer enrichment program company

Practice Makes Perfect Holdings (PMP) is a for-profit corporation that partners with communities to create summer enrichment programs for inner-city youth from elementary school to college matriculation using a near-peer model. The organization pairs skills development for younger students with leadership development, career training and college prep for older students. PMP matches academically struggling elementary and middle school students with older, higher achieving mentor peers from the same inner-city neighborhoods. Trained college interns and certified teachers supervise the near-peer relationship for a five-week program.

In 2013, PMP was recognized at the Clinton Global Initiative University Conference.

== Goal ==
For over a century, scholars have recognized that summer vacation is a period when students’ rate of academic development declines relative to the school year. The gap in the learning cycle which occurs during summer vacation is more prominent for children that are disadvantaged. Some studies indicate that this may have long term effects on a students school career and eventual job prospects.

Research has shown that approximately two-thirds of the ninth-grade achievement gap between lower and higher income youth can be partly explained by earlier summer learning loss. Students from low-income areas lose between 2.5 and 3.5 months of academic learning each summer, and teachers spend four to six weeks of the new school year reviewing old material. "Practice Makes Perfect" attempts to address this "learning lag" through a summer education program in socio-economically disadvantaged neighborhoods.

== History ==
After reading McKinsey's 2009 report “The Economic Impact of the Achievement Gap in America’s Schools", Karim Abouelnaga brought together five fellow Cornell students Andre Perez, Zach West, Amy Mitchell, Brennan Spreitzer, and Nicolas Savvides in 2010 to start PMP, as a student organization.

In its first year, supported by Entrepreneurship@Cornell, the Cornell Public Service Center and various individuals, PMP launched its pilot program in Long Island City, Queens. Nicolas Savvides served as program administrator for Practice Makes Perfect. As financing difficulties arose, the program operating expenses were slashed substantially and the founders ran a pilot program on almost one-fifth of the original estimated cost. Since then, the organization has operated programs in the Bronx, Brooklyn, Queens, and Manhattan. Over the last four years, PMP has served over 550 students and indirectly impacted thousands more through its community service efforts. PMP strives to ameliorate the summer learning loss.

PMP took part in the Points of Light Civic Accelerator in 2013.

In 2014, the program changed from fully philanthropic to a more sustainable fee-for-service approach.

== Program ==
PMP programs operate on the four pillars of near-peer, academic intensive, cultural learning, and community based.

=== Key Participants ===
PMP pairs academically struggling students with higher achieving mentors from the same neighborhoods and places them under the supervision of college interns and certified teachers for a five-week academic intensive summer program. Every site has a minimum of two classrooms, each consisting of 20 scholars/students, 5 mentors, 1 teaching fellow and a joint teaching coach.

- Students grades K – 8 in need of academic support and remediation are paired in cohorts of four and assigned a mentor for the duration of summer.
- Mentors are students that have completed grades 4 – 12 and have achieved proficiency. Mentors receive a small financial stipend. Additionally, they receive test prep support in SHSAT, PSAT, and SAT in conjunction with high school and college readiness.
- Teaching Fellows are students that recently completed their junior, senior year in college or are attending graduate school. They are provided with professional development and training prior to their placement.
- Teaching Coaches are certified NYC Department of Education teachers and are given responsibility for two classes over the summer. They conduct evaluations using the Danielson Framework.

== Methodology & Operations ==
PMP programs operates in school buildings. Students receive instruction in math, English, and writing, in addition to enrichment activities like music, dance, and drama. Breakfast and lunch are served through the NYC School Food program; however, students can bring in their own meals. Participants engage in a local community service project to help rebuild their neighborhoods, such as cleaning up parks or organizing food drives. Throughout the summer, scholars partake in a spelling bee, math bee, and world day. Scholars go on trips to museums, art exhibitions, zoos, gardens, and corporate offices. At the conclusion of the summer, the principal is provided with a progress report that highlights aggregate progress and each additional students’ strengths and areas that need improvement.

== Outcomes & Evaluation ==
In 2015, PMP will begin a two-year independent evaluation that is being conducted by Philliber Research Associates to determine the impact of the program.

== Media ==
USA Today said that “Abouelnaga’s non-profit, Practice Makes Perfect, which he started with five other Cornell University students in 2011, has emerged as a potential answer to the problems that plague summer schooling nationwide.”[9]

The New York Times said “Perhaps PMP will grow up to become one piece of a solution — a way to give a larger section of low-income children the kind of summer enrichment middle class students take for granted.”

== Supporters ==
In December 2013, PMP was awarded $100,000 by the Pershing Square Foundation "...to grow to support 1,000 students this summer, adding three new staff members and improving their curriculum and programming."

PMP has received support from Ernst & Young, Ann & Andrew Tisch, Alan Hassenfeld, Stanley O’Neal, Echoing Green, The Heckscher Foundation for Children, The A.L. Mailman Family Foundation, The Johnson Family Foundation, The Banfi Vintners Foundation and Estee Lauder Companies.

In 2015, Phi Sigma Sigma adopted PMP as a national philanthropic partner.

== Karim Adel Abouelnaga ==
Karim Abouelnaga
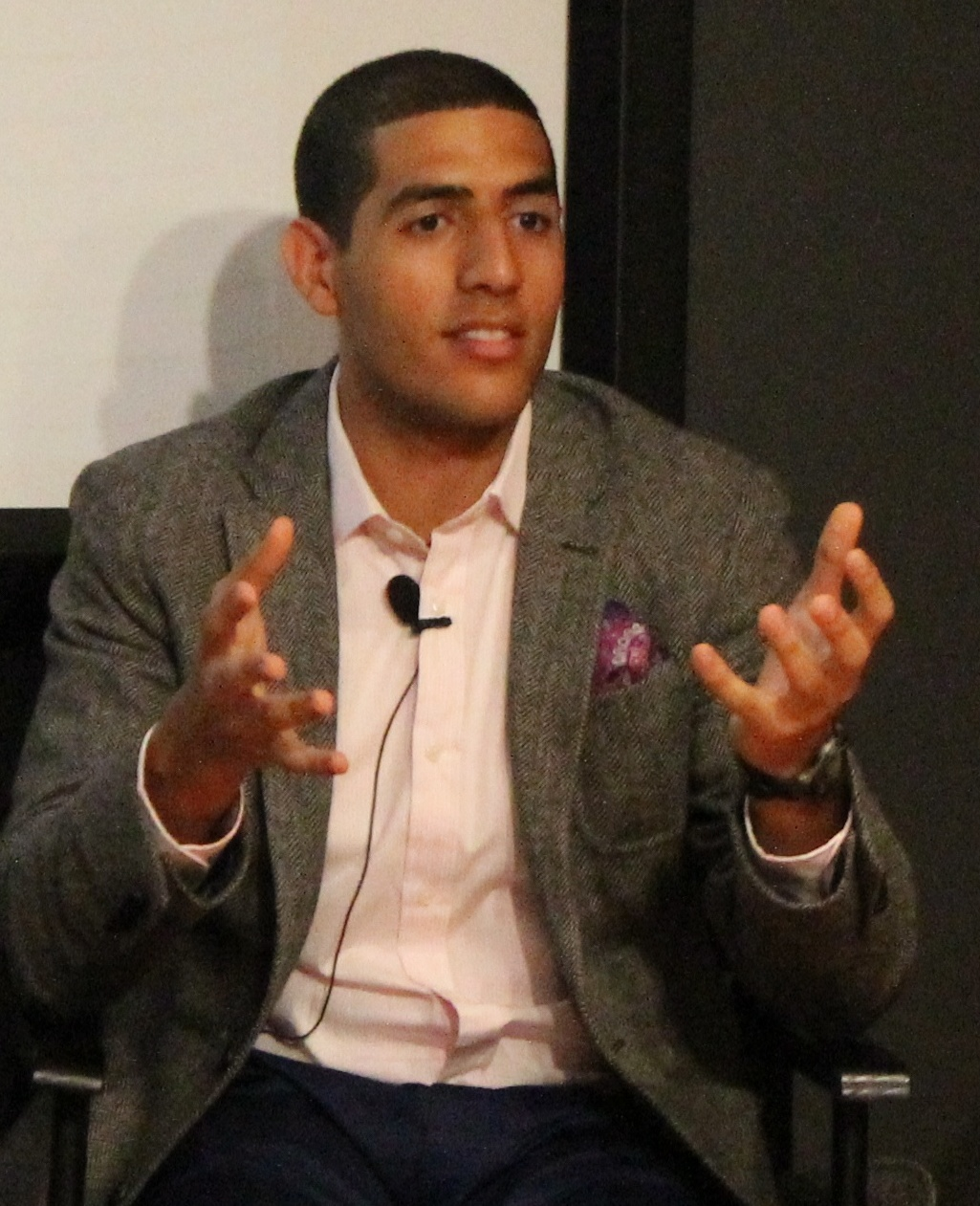
- Born: Karim Adel Abouelnaga; December 15, 1991 (age 34); Queens, NY
- Education: Cornell University
- Occupations: Founder and CEO, Practice Makes Perfect

Karim Adel Abouelnaga (born December 15, 1991) is the Founder and CEO of Practice Makes Perfect Holdings (PMP), a for-profit corporation that aims to redefine the summer learning experience for low-income youth.

Abouelnaga's parents immigrated to the US from Egypt and the family struggled after his father died of lymphoma when Aboueinaga was 15. He and his older brother worked to support the family. In high school, he took part in a program called REACH that offered financial incentives and extra support to students from his low-income school who agreed to take advanced placement courses.

He is a graduate of Cornell University's School of Hotel Administration.

In 2013, Abouelnaga was awarded an "Echoing Green" Global Fellowship for his work with "Practice Makes Perfect". ("Echoing Green" is a philanthropic non-profit that invests in social programs.)

== See also ==
- Summer learning loss
