= The Vanguard School (Pennsylvania) =

Location
- 1777 North Valley Road; Malvern, PA 19355; United States
- 40.061059°N 75.488433°W

Information
- School type: Approved Private School
- Motto: A program of Valley Forge Educational Services
- Religious affiliation: Nonsectarian
- Established: 1959
- Founder: Milton Brutten
- Educational authority: Pennsylvania Department of Education
- CEEB code: 393152
- Director: Tom Quinn
- Teaching staff: 188
- Age: 4 to 21
- Enrollment: 263
- Colors: Blue and Gold
- Nickname: Dolphins
- Tuition: $68,500
- Website: vfes.net/vanguard

The Vanguard School is an approved private school in Malvern, Chester County, Pennsylvania, United States, approximately twenty-two miles northwest of Philadelphia on the campus of Valley Forge Educational Services.

== History ==
The Vanguard School was founded in 1959 by child psychologist Dr. Milton Brutten. It was initially located in Haverford, Pennsylvania. In 1962, the Lower School transferred to a newly-purchased campus on North Valley Road in Malvern.

Vanguard became the first private school in the Commonwealth approved under Pennsylvania Act 318 to receive tuition assistance for children whose needs could not be served in their local public schools. The Vanguard Concept was then planned and developed between 1964 and 1969 in Lake Wales, Florida, as a boarding school as the Vanguard School (Florida) and as day schools in Coconut Grove (Vanguard School of Coconut Grove) and Fort Lauderdale, Florida and other locations; however, these schools no longer affiliate with Vanguard in Pennsylvania.

== Governance ==
Valley Forge Educational Services (VFES), a Pennsylvania-based nonprofit organization offering educational, summer camp, and employment-based programming to children and adults with disabilities, operates the Vanguard School.

The Pennsylvania Department of Education has authorized The Vanguard School to receive funding from school districts and the state to provide an appropriate education to students with disabilities. The School serves students from more than 56 school districts from 9 counties.

== Curriculum ==
The Vanguard School provides comprehensive special education and related clinical services that are focused on ensuring the readiness for life of individual students. The school offers an integrated academic, social, and daily living skills approach. The goal is for each student to become a contributing community member.

A team of therapists supports students in the classroom, individually and in small groups, as well as through consultative efforts. Related clinical services include speech-language, occupational and physical therapies, school psychology, counseling, behavior support, and nursing. All therapists and specialists can be actively involved in the student's entire day; clinicians co-treat across disciplines and consult with teachers and other professionals regularly.

The school is a Pennsylvania Approved Private School serving students aged four to twenty-one whose exceptionalities may include autism, emotional disturbance, speech-language impairment, specific learning disability, and other health impairments. Each student receives an individualized education program (IEP) that is created in concert with their parents and the home school district in order to provide each student with the services and therapies needed.

=== Speech-Language Intensive Classrooms ===
The school's speech-language intensive (SLI) classrooms serve students with complex communication needs that significantly impact their ability to communicate effectively. The classrooms utilize a collaborative model between the classroom teacher and the speech-language pathologist (SLP). SLI classrooms are language-rich environments that offer a combination of 1:1 and small-group instruction designed to support the intense language needs of the students.

An SLI classroom is self-contained with a certified special education teacher, a classroom aide, and an assigned SLP. The classroom teacher and SLP collaborate to generalize student skills, provide appropriate visual supports, and develop student independence. The SLP is in the classroom for daily push-in support during various classroom periods (e.g., reading, daily living skills, facilitated play, etc.) to encourage carry-over and generalize student goals.

=== Intensive Therapeutic Classrooms ===
These classrooms are provided for students who need additional support due to the frequency and intensity of behavioral difficulties. The school's interdisciplinary team consists of a board-certified behavior analyst, clinical social worker, certified special education teacher, and classroom aide who are focused on teaching students evidence-based, behavioral and emotional regulation skills, problem-solving skills, and skills to manage frustration and anger.

=== The Vanguard Transition Center ===
As part of The Vanguard School, students aged eighteen to twenty-one receive continuing education, counseling, self-advocacy training, career exploration, and community-based vocational experiences.

=== Extended School Year ===
The Extended School Year (ESY) program is offered through the Summer Matters division of Valley Forge Educational Services. It is a program for eligible students from Vanguard School and neighboring districts and is designed to maintain skills and reduce academic and behavioral regression during summer by incorporating students' educational, social, behavioral, and vocational needs from individual IEP goals.

=== Vocational Immersion Program ===
The Vocational Immersion Program (VIP) equips young adults with developmental disabilities, including autism spectrum disorder and related social challenges, aged eighteen to twenty-four, with critical social and employment-readiness skills through a four-week intensive program that includes classroom-based instruction, online learning, workplace internships with job coaches and a week-long supported living experience.

=== Customized Workforce Solutions (CWS) ===
The Customized Workforce Solutions program (CWS) provides employment-related services to adults with disabilities. It offers person-centered support and training to help job seekers attain their employment goals by allowing adults to define their goals, understand their skills and discover their vocational interests and work preferences.
