= HMS Invincible (1869) =

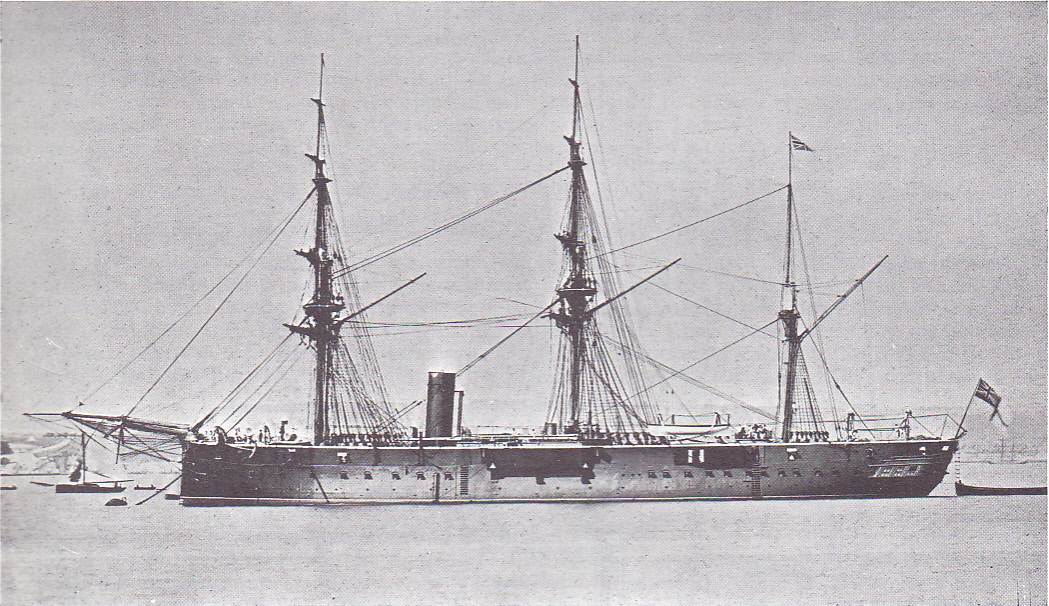
- HMS Invincible off Plymouth, 1870

History

United Kingdom
- Name: Invincible
- Builder: Robert Napier and Sons
- Laid down: 28 June 1867
- Launched: 29 May 1869
- Commissioned: 1 October 1870
- Renamed: Erebus, 1904; Fisgard II, 1906
- Reclassified: As depot ship, 1901; As training ship, 1906
- Fate: Sank, 17 September 1914

General characteristics
- Class & type: Audacious-class ironclad battleship
- Displacement: 6,106 long tons (6,204 t)
- Length: 280 ft (85.3 m)
- Beam: 54 ft (16.5 m)
- Draught: 22 ft 7 in (6.9 m)
- Installed power: 6 × boilers; 4,021 ihp (2,998 kW)
- Propulsion: 1 × coal-fired reciprocating steam engine
- Speed: Steam: 13.5 knots (25.0 km/h; 15.5 mph) Sail: 10 knots (19 km/h; 12 mph)
- Complement: 450
- Armament: 10 × RML 9 in (230 mm) guns; 4 × 64 pdr (29 kg) guns
- Armour: Belt: 8 in (20 cm) (amidships); 6 in (15 cm) (ends); Central battery: 6–8 in (15–20 cm)

HMS Invincible was an Audacious-class ironclad battleship built for the Royal Navy during the 1860s. She was built at the Napier shipyard and completed in 1870. Completed just 10 years after HMS Warrior, she still carried sails as well as a steam engine.

== Armament ==
The Audacious class was armed with ten 9-inch (230 mm) muzzle-loading guns, supported by four 6-inch (150 mm) muzzle loaders. These were located in a broadside pattern over a 59 ft (18 m) two-deck battery amidships—this was the area of the ship least affected by its motion, and made for a very stable gun platform.

== Early career ==
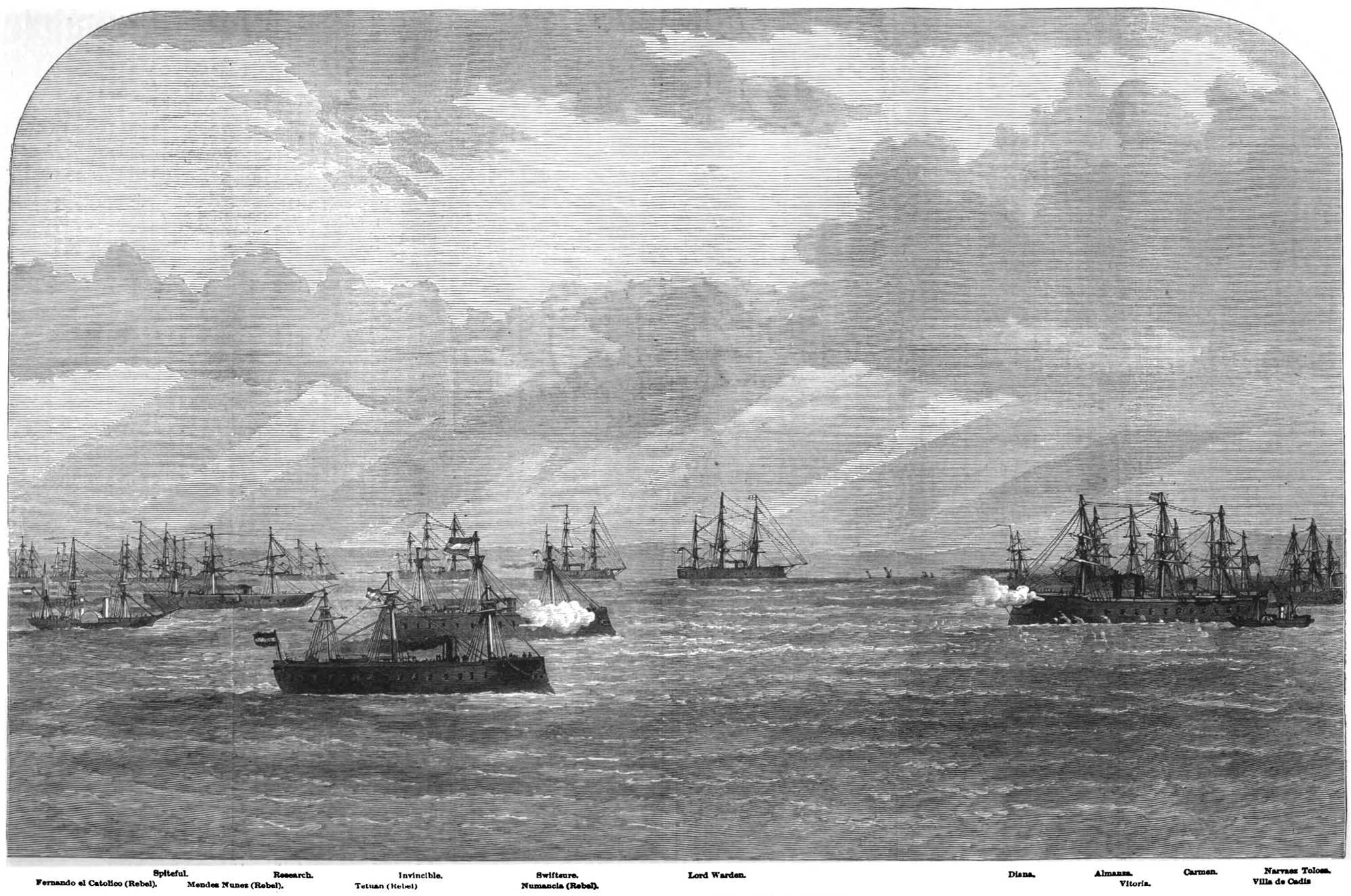
At the Battle of Escombrera in 1873

For the first year of her career, she was a guardship at Hull, before being replaced by her sister HMS Audacious. She was then transferred to the Mediterranean, where she served until 1886. She was sent to Cádiz in 1873 to prevent ships seized by republicans during the civil war in Spain from leaving harbour. She rejoined the Mediterranean Fleet in 1878 under the command of Captain Lindsay Brine, but her poor state of seamanship attracted the ire of the commander-in-chief, Geoffrey Hornby. In early 1879 Invincible blundered badly, putting two ships at hazard, and Brine was court-martialled. Though acquitted, Brine was relieved by Captain Edmund Fremantle.

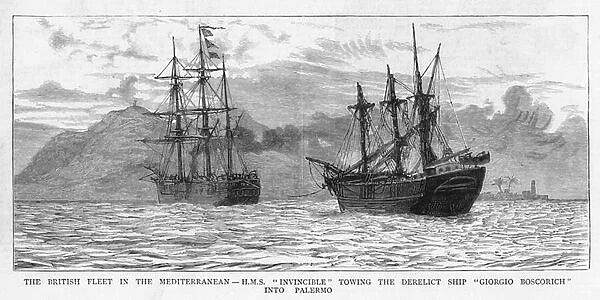
HMS Invincible towing the derelict ship Giorgio Boscorich into Palermo. The Graphic 1880

In August 1880, Invincible discovered the dismasted and abandoned Austro-Hungarian barque George Roscovich off Sardinia, Italy. She towed the barque in to Palermo, Sicily, Italy on 5 August. Invincible was Admiral Seymour's temporary flagship at the 1882 bombardment of Alexandria because his normal one, HMS Alexandra, drew too much to enter the inner harbour. She provided men for the naval brigade that was subsequently landed and she also provided men for Lord Charles Beresford's naval brigade in the Sudan campaign of 1885.

== Later career and shipwreck ==
She made a trip to China in 1886 to carry out a new crew for Audacious before becoming the guardship at Southampton until 1893. Her engines were removed in 1901 when she became a depot ship at Sheerness for a destroyer flotilla. She was renamed HMS Erebus in 1904, a name that she bore until 1906, when she was converted into a training ship at Portsmouth for engineering artificers and was renamed Fisgard II (Audacious had been renamed Fisgard in 1904).

On 17 September 1914, she sank during a storm off Portland Bill with the loss of 21 of her crew of 64. She was being towed from Portsmouth to Scapa Flow where she was to act as a receiving ship for seamen newly mobilised for World War I. She now lies upside down with the bottom of the hull about 164 ft (50 m) below sea level.

HMS Fisgard II is a Designated vessel under schedule 1 of The Protection of Military Remains Act 1986 (Designation of Vessels and Controlled Sites) Order 2012.

== Publications ==
- Ballard, G. A. (1980). The Black Battlefleet. Naval Institute Press. ISBN 0-87021-924-3.
- Brown, David K. (1997). Warrior to Dreadnought: Warship Development 1860–1905. Chatham Publishing. ISBN 1-86176-022-1.
- Colledge, J. J.; Warlow, Ben & Bush, Steve (2020). Ships of the Royal Navy: The Complete Record of all Fighting Ships of the Royal Navy from the 15th Century to the Present (5th revised and updated ed.). Seaforth Publishing. ISBN 978-1-5267-9327-0.
- Dodson, Aidan (2015). "The Incredible Hulks: The Fisgard Training Establishment and Its Ships". Warship 2015. Conway. pp. 29–43. ISBN 978-1-84486-276-4.
- Friedman, Norman (2018). British Battleships of the Victorian Era. Naval Institute Press. ISBN 978-1-68247-329-0.
- Colledge, J. J.; Warlow, Ben & Bush, Steve (2020). Ships of the Royal Navy: The Complete Record of all Fighting Ships of the Royal Navy from the 15th Century to the Present (5th revised and updated ed.). Seaforth Publishing. ISBN 978-1-5267-9327-0.
- Lyon, David & Winfield, Rif (2004). The Sail & Steam Navy List: All the Ships of the Royal Navy 1815–1889. Chatham Publishing. ISBN 1-86176-032-9.
- Parkes, Oscar (1990) [1966]. British Battleships, Warrior 1860 to Vanguard 1950: A History of Design, Construction, and Armament (New & rev. ed.). Naval Institute Press. ISBN 1-55750-075-4.
- Roberts, John (1979). "Great Britain (including Empire Forces)". In Chesneau, Roger & Kolesnik, Eugene M. (eds.). Conway's All the World's Fighting Ships 1860–1905. Mayflower Books. pp. 1–113. ISBN 0-8317-0302-4.
