= National Summer Learning Association =

The National Summer Learning Association (NSLA) is an organization in the United States that claims to aspire "for every child to be safe, healthy, and engaged in learning during the summer."

== History ==
In 1992, Matthew Boulay, a student at Johns Hopkins University, recruited his fellow undergraduates to provide tutoring and academic support to Baltimore City public schools students during the summer months. This led to a successful program called Teach Baltimore. As a result of the growing research on summer learning loss, Teach Baltimore evolved into the Center for Summer Learning at Johns Hopkins University in 2001. In September 2009, the Center transformed into the National Summer Learning Association, an independent organization.

== Activities ==
NSLA serves as a network hub for different summer learning programs and others interested in summer learning across the United States. According to their website, their efforts are focused on achieving the following results:

- Increase the number of providers offering high-quality summer learning programs to young people living in poverty;
- Increase the number of organizations and policymakers that identify summer learning as a public policy priority; and
- Increase funding for high-quality summer learning programs for young people who currently lack choices and opportunities.

Partners of the NSLA include the American Camp Association and Sylvan Learning.

== Reception ==
=== Media reception ===
NSLA has been cited in the many articles discussing summer learning loss and its implications for the achievement gap in the United States in publications including the New York Times, the Washington Post and the Wall Street Journal.

NSLA is regularly cited in a number of local newspapers in connection with recommendations for summer activities.
