= Martin Akers =

English-born New Zealand footballer

Personal information
- Full name: Martin Akers
- Date of birth: 11 July 1968 (age 58)
- Place of birth: England
- Position: Forward

Senior career*
Years	Team	Apps	(Gls)
1985–1993	Napier City Rovers		(?)
1993–1995	Wollongong City	24	(7)
1995	Wellington Olympic	19	(17)
1996–1999	Central United		
2000–2010	Napier City Rovers	300	(150)

International career
1997	New Zealand	1	(0)
- * Club domestic league appearances and goals

Martin Akers is a former association football player who represented New Zealand at international level.

Akers made a solitary official international appearance for New Zealand in a 0–5 loss to Indonesia on 21 September 1997.
