= Audacious-class ironclad =

1870 class of British ironclads

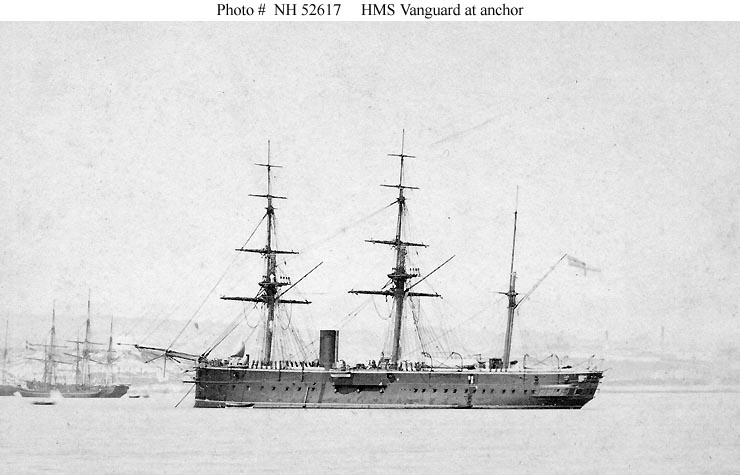
- HMS Vanguard with the later barque rig

Class overview
- Name: Audacious class
- Built: 1867–1870
- In commission: 1870–1927
- Completed: 4
- Lost: 2

General characteristics
- Type: Ironclad warship
- Displacement: Audacious/Invincible: 6,106 tons; Iron Duke/Vanguard: 6,034 tons
- Length: Audacious/Invincible: 280 ft (85 m); Iron Duke/Vanguard: 341 ft 3 in (104.01 m)
- Beam: 54 ft (16 m)
- Draught: Audacious/Invincible: 22 ft 7 in (6.88 m); Iron Duke/Vanguard: 23 ft 2 in (7.06 m)
- Propulsion: Coal-fired reciprocating steam engines; 6 boilers; 2 shafts
- Sail plan: Full-rigged ship; later converted to barque-rig
- Speed: Audacious/Invincible: 13.5 knots (25.0 km/h; 15.5 mph); Iron Duke/Vanguard: 13 knots (24 km/h; 15 mph)
- Complement: 450
- Armament: Audacious/Invincible: 10 × 9 inch guns; 4 × 64-pounder guns; Iron Duke/Vanguard: 10 × 12-ton, 9 inch (229 mm) RML guns; 4 × 6 in (150 mm) 64-pounder (29 kg) RML 'chaser' guns (2 at bows; 2 at stern); 6 × 20-pounder (9 kg) guns; Ram
- Armour: Audacious/Invincible: 8 ft (2.4 m) waterline belt 6 to 8 in (150 to 200 mm) thick; Central battery 6 to 8 in (150 to 200 mm) armour; 10 in (250 mm) teak backing; Iron Duke/Vanguard: Iron plating with teak backing; Belt: 6 to 8 in (150 to 200 mm); Battery: 4 to 6 in (100 to 150 mm); Bulkheads: 4 to 5 in (100 to 130 mm)

The Audacious-class ironclad battleships were designed by Sir Edward Reed at the request of the Board of Admiralty to serve as second-class battleships on distant foreign stations.

== Background and design ==
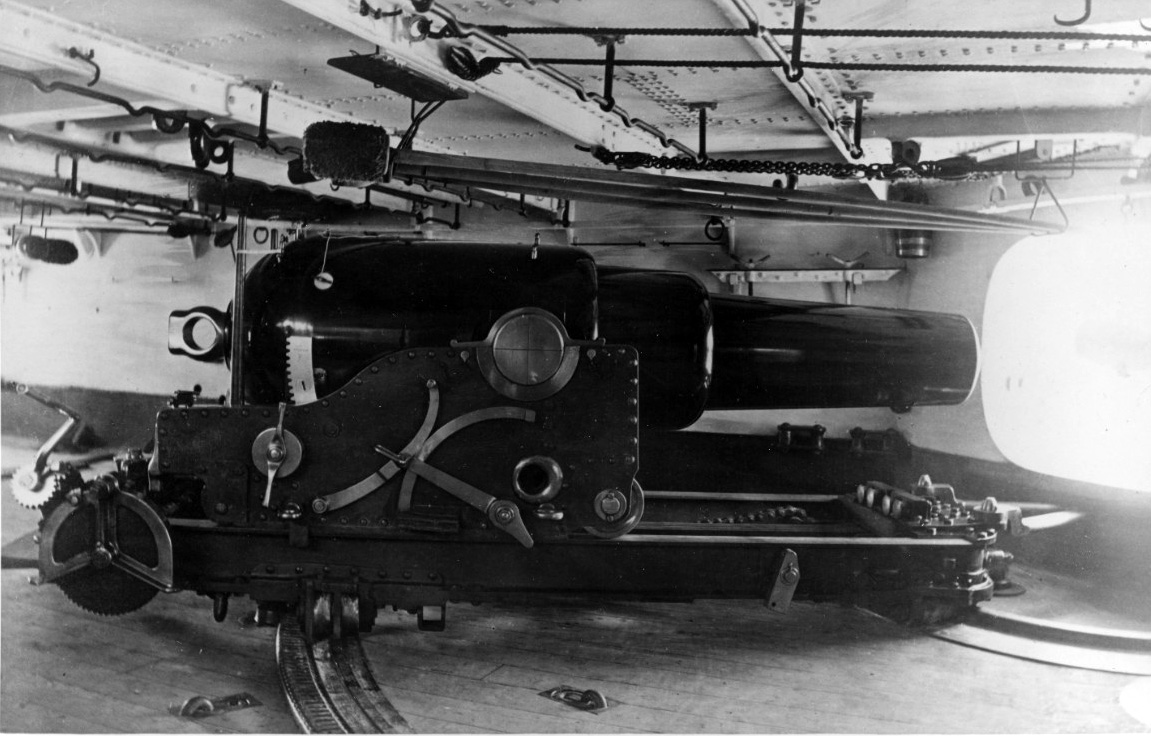
A 9-inch (229 mm) muzzle-loading rifle aboard HMS Iron Duke c. 1870s. Hanging from the deckhead above the gun are its ramming staff and its sponging-out staff. One of the gun's shells, partially obscured by the glare from outside, is hanging in the gunport in front of the gun.

The principal motivation driving the Admiralty was the French policy, already well advanced, of dispatching their own small ironclads to these same distant stations. HMS Monarch was under construction, and HMS Captain had been authorised. Both of these were turret-armed ships, and the press agitated for a turret-mounted armament in these newly ordered ships. The Admiralty, however, decided that as there had been built a long succession of successful broadside ironclads, and no turret-armed ships had been produced other than some coastal defence ships of low displacement and limited range, it would be better to await the assessment of Monarch and Captain before departing from the broadside principle.

As the ships were intended for service in waters far distant from Britain, and given the limited efficiency of the steam engines of the period, it was necessary to equip them with a full sailing rig. Reed never wavered from his belief that in a fully rigged ship armament carried in a central broadside battery was the superior method, being unobstructed by masts and rigging. Both the designer and the Admiralty were therefore in total agreement that these ships should not be armed with turret-mounted artillery. The rig was later converted to a barque-rig, which required fewer hands to manage.

The ships were designed following the lines of HMS Defence, by then, more than five years old. Reed found that, on the dimensions of the older ship, the armament, armour and machinery would all be insufficient for the stated requirements, and asked for an increase in tonnage, which was reluctantly granted by the Board.

Although four ships were required, initially only two, HMS Audacious and HMS Invincible were laid down. The Admiralty, following a commitment made to Parliament by the First Lord of the Admiralty, put the other two ships out to tender. Submissions of various designs were received: a broadside and turret ship from Mare & Company, a broadside ship from Palmers, a different broadside ship from Thames Ironworks, and turret ships from Napiers, Samudas and Lairds Co & Sons. All were determined to be in some way inadequate, and ultimately the third and fourth ships were built, with some delay, to the Admiralty design.

This class was the first homogeneous class of battleships to be launched since the Prince Consort class, and the last until the Admiral class.

== Ships ==
- Audacious : Launched 27 February 1869. Renamed HMS Fisgard in 1902 and reclassified as a Depot ship. Renamed HMS Imperieuse in 1914 and reclassified as a Repair ship. Sold for breaking up 12 March 1927.
- Invincible : Launched 29 May 1869. Reclassified as a Depot ship in 1901. Renamed HMS Erebus in 1904. Renamed HMS Fisgard II and reclassified as a Training ship in 1906. Sank while under tow on 17 September 1914.
- Iron Duke : Launched 1 March 1870. Put into Reserve 1890, converted to coal hulk 1900. Sold for scrap 15 May 1906.
- Vanguard : Launched 3 January 1870. Sunk after accidental collision with Iron Duke on 1 September 1875.

== Bibliography ==
- Ballard, G. A. (1980). The Black Battlefleet. Naval Institute Press. ISBN 0-87021-924-3.
- Beeler, John (2001). Birth of the Battleship: British Capital Ship Design 1870–1881. Naval Institute Press. ISBN 1-55750-213-7.
- Brown, David K. (1997). Warrior to Dreadnought: Warship Development 1860–1905. Chatham Publishing. ISBN 1-86176-022-1.
- Dodson, Aidan (2015), "The Incredible Hulks: The Fisgard Training Establishment and Its Ships", Warship 2015, Conway, pp. 29–43, ISBN 978-1-84486-276-4
- Friedman, Norman (2018). British Battleships of the Victorian Era. Naval Institute Press. ISBN 978-1-68247-329-0.
- Lyon, David & Winfield, Rif (2004). The Sail & Steam Navy List: All the Ships of the Royal Navy 1815–1889. Chatham Publishing. ISBN 1-86176-032-9.
- Parkes, Oscar (1990) [1966]. British Battleships, Warrior 1860 to Vanguard 1950: A History of Design, Construction, and Armament (New & rev. ed.). Naval Institute Press. ISBN 1-55750-075-4.
- Roberts, John (1979). "Great Britain (including Empire Forces)". In Chesneau, Roger & Kolesnik, Eugene M. (eds.). Conway's All the World's Fighting Ships 1860–1905. Mayflower Books. pp. 1–113. ISBN 0-8317-0302-4.
- Silverstone, Paul H. (1984). Directory of the World's Capital Ships. Hippocrene Books. ISBN 0-88254-979-0.
