= Vanguard Award =

Vanguard Award may refer to:

- ASCAP Vanguard Award, an annual award presented by the American Society of Composers, Authors and Publishers (ASCAP)
- GLAAD Vanguard Award, an annual award presented at the GLAAD Media Awards
- Michael Jackson Video Vanguard Award, a special award presented at the MTV Video Music Awards
