= Jeremy Brown (footballer) =

New Zealand footballer

Personal information
- Full name: Jeremy Brown
- Date of birth: 16 April 1977 (age 49)
- Place of birth: Palmerson North, New Zealand
- Height: 1.85 m (6 ft 1 in)
- Position: Midfielder

Senior career*
Years	Team	Apps	(Gls)
1995,1997, 2000, 2001	Manawatu AFC		
1996,1997-1999	Napier City Rovers		
2001-2004	Apia Leichhardt Tigers		
2003	Sydney University		
2008-2009	Gladesville Spirit		
2010	Dunbar Rovers		

International career
2000	New Zealand	2	(0)
- * Club domestic league appearances and goals

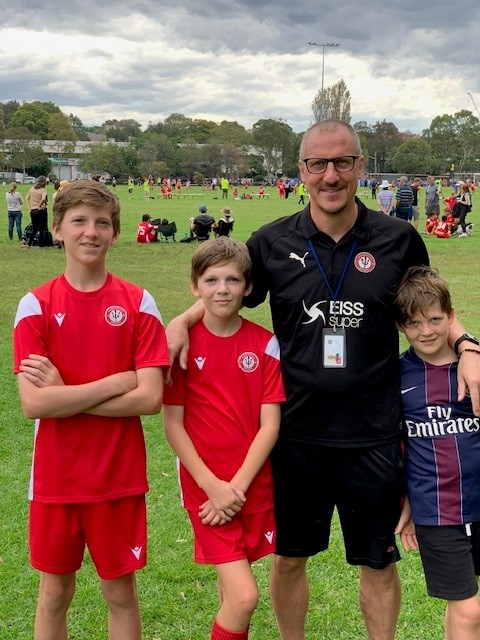

Jeremy Brown is a former association football player who represented New Zealand at international level.

Brown played for Manawatu AFC and Napier City Rovers in the NZ National League between 1995 and 2001. Winning the National League in the 1997-98 Season with Napier City Rovers. He was twice a finalist in the NZ Young Player of the year in 1996 & 1998. He also represented NZ at U20 and U23 Level between 1996 & 2000, captaining the U23 team in 1999. He moved to Australia in 2000 and played for Apia Leichhardt in the NSW state league 2001 - 2004. Winning the player of the year award in 2001 and also winning the NSW State Championship in the 2002–2003 season. He also played for Gladesville Spirit from 2008 - 2009 winning the NSW Stage League Div 1 title in 2008.

Brown played twice for the All Whites in the Merdeka Tournament in Malaysia in 2000, including the final in a 2–0 win over Malaysia on 19 August 2000.

He currently lives in Sydney and coaches his sons at Marrickville Red Devils FC

Honours

NZ National League Winner 1997-98 / Massey University Sporting Blue 1998 & 1999 / OFC Olympic Qualifying Tournament Winner 1999 / Merdeka Tournament 2000 / NZ National League All Stars 2000 / NSW State League 2002-2003 / NSW Div 1 Champions 2008
