= HMS Iron Duke (1870) =

Audacious-class central battery ironclad (1870)

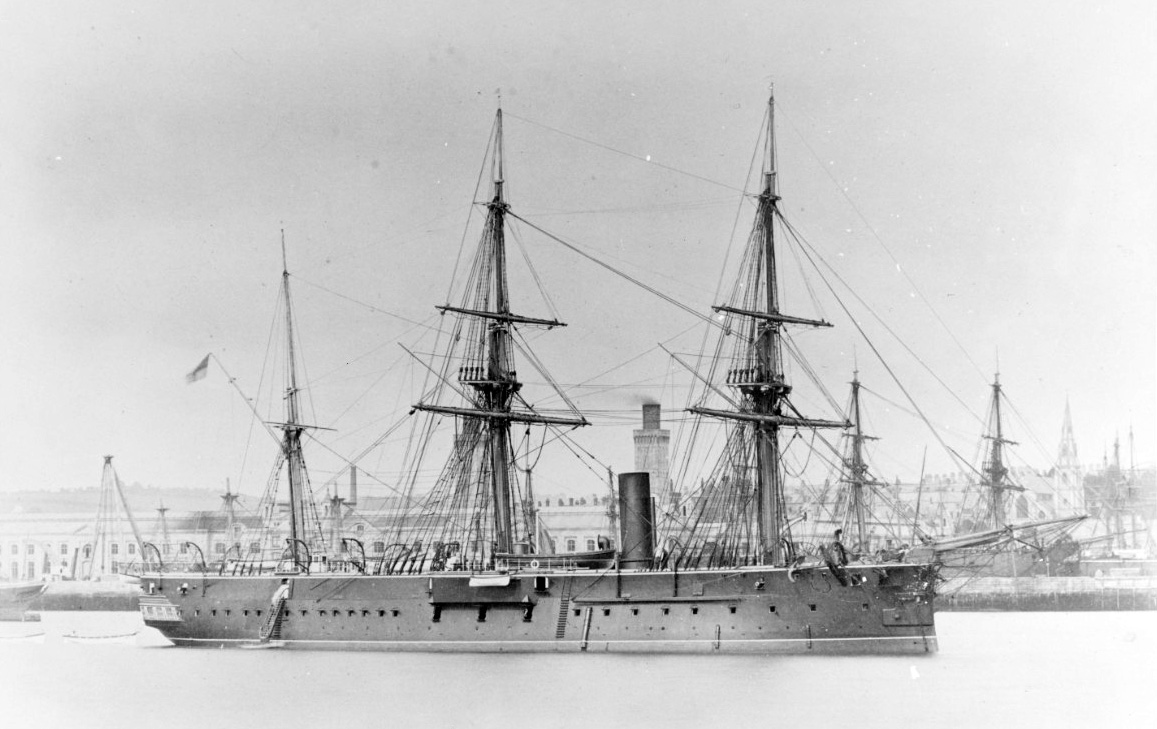
- Iron Duke at anchor

History

United Kingdom
- Name: Iron Duke
- Namesake: Arthur Wellesley, 1st Duke of Wellington
- Ordered: 26 September 1867
- Builder: Pembroke Dockyard
- Laid down: 23 August 1868
- Launched: 1 March 1870
- Completed: 21 January 1871
- Commissioned: 1 April 1871
- Decommissioned: 1890
- Reclassified: Converted to coal hulk, 1900
- Fate: Sold for scrap, 15 May 1906

General characteristics
- Class & type: Audacious-class ironclad
- Displacement: 6,034 long tons (6,131 t)
- Tons burthen: 3,774 (bm)
- Length: 280 ft (85.3 m) (p/p)
- Beam: 54 ft (16.5 m)
- Draught: 22 ft 7 in (6.9 m)
- Installed power: 9 rectangular fire-tube boilers; 4,268 ihp (3,183 kW)
- Propulsion: 2 shafts; 2 horizontal-return, connecting-rod steam engines
- Speed: 13 knots (24 km/h; 15 mph)
- Complement: 450
- Armament: 10 × RML 9 in (229 mm) 12-ton rifled muzzle-loading guns; 4 × RML 6.3-inch (160 mm) 71-cwt guns (Note: "Cwt" is the abbreviation for hundredweight, 71 cwt referring to the weight of the gun.); 6 × RBL 20 pdr 3.75 in (95 mm) rifled breech-loading guns
- Armour: Waterline belt: 6 to 8 in (152 to 203 mm); Battery: 6 in (102 to 152 mm); Bulkheads: 4 to 5 in (102 to 127 mm)

Service record
- Part of: China Squadron 1871–75, 1877–83 (flagship); First Reserve Squadron 1875–77; Channel Fleet 1885–90

HMS Iron Duke was the last of four Audacious-class central battery ironclads built for the Royal Navy in the late 1860s. Completed in 1871, the ship was briefly assigned to the Reserve Fleet as a guardship in Ireland, before she was sent out to the China Station as its flagship. Iron Duke returned four years later and resumed her duties as a guardship. She accidentally rammed and sank her sister ship, Vanguard, in a heavy fog in mid-1875 and returned to the Far East in 1878. The ship ran aground twice during this deployment and returned home in 1883. After a lengthy refit, Iron Duke was assigned to the Channel Fleet in 1885 and remained there until she again became a guardship in 1890. The ship was converted into a coal hulk a decade later and continued in that role until 1906 when she was sold for scrap and broken up.

== Design and description ==
The Audacious class was designed as a second-class ironclad intended for overseas service. They were 280 feet (85.3 m) long between perpendiculars and had a beam of 54 feet (16.5 m). Iron Duke had a draught of 21 feet 7 inches (6.6 m) forward and 22 feet 7 inches (6.9 m) aft. The Audacious-class ships displaced 6,034 long tons (6,131 t) and had a tonnage of 3,774 tons burthen. They had a complement of 450 officers and ratings.

Iron Duke had a pair of two-cylinder, horizontal-return, connecting-rod steam engines, each driving a single 16-foot-6-inch (5.03 m) propeller using steam provided by six rectangular boilers. The engines were designed to give the ships a speed of 13 knots (24 km/h; 15 mph); Iron Duke reached a speed of 13.64 knots (25.26 km/h; 15.70 mph) from 4,268 indicated horsepower (3,183 kW) during her sea trials on 2 November 1870. She carried a maximum of 450 long tons (460 t) of coal.

The Audacious class was ship-rigged with three masts and had a sail area of 25,054 square feet (2,327.6 m^{2}). Around 1871 they were re-rigged as barques with their sail area reduced to 23,700 square feet (2,200 m^{2}) To reduce drag, the funnel was telescopic and could be lowered. Under sail alone, they could reach 10 knots (19 km/h; 12 mph).

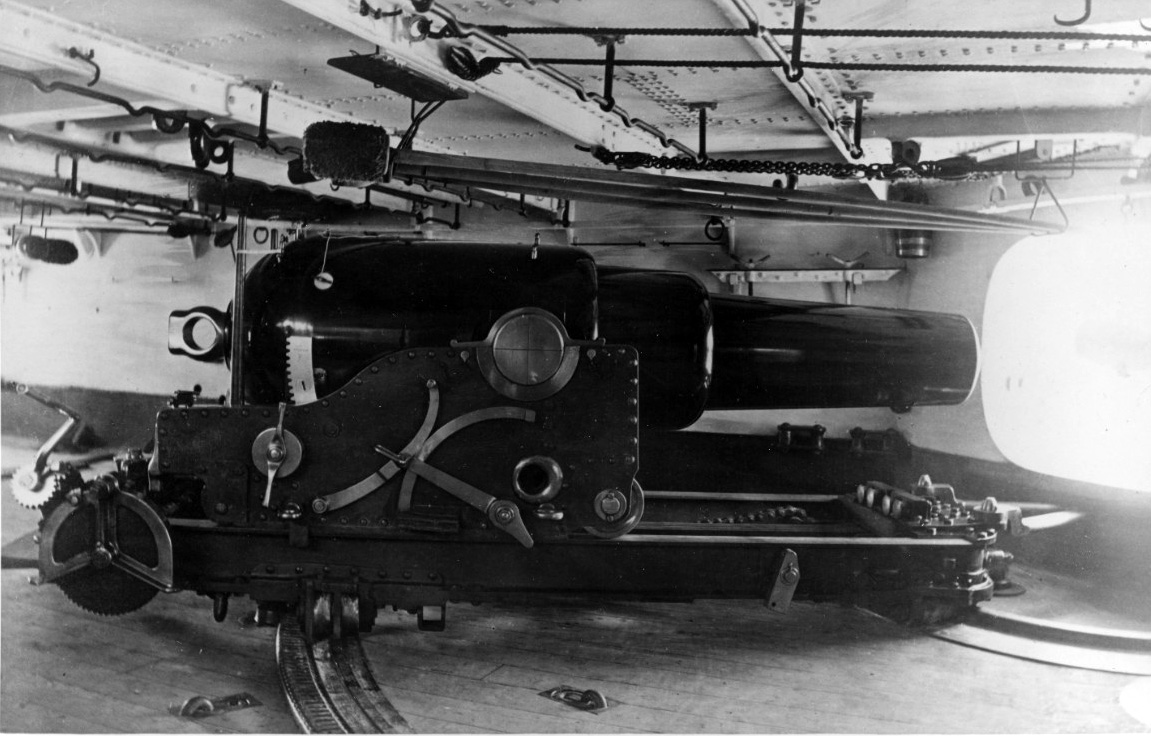
A 9-inch (229 mm) rifled muzzle-loading gun aboard Iron Duke in the 1870s

The main armament of the Audacious-class ships consisted of 10 RML 9-inch (229 mm) rifled muzzle-loading guns. Six of these were positioned on the main deck, three on each broadside, and the other four guns were mounted on the corners of the upper deck battery. The battery protruded over the sides of the ships to give the guns a certain amount of end-on fire. The shell of the nine-inch gun weighed 254 pounds (115.2 kg) while the gun itself weighed 12 long tons (12 t). It had a muzzle velocity of 1,420 ft/s (430 m/s) and was rated with the ability to penetrate 11.3 inches (287 mm) of wrought-iron armour at the muzzle.

The ships were equipped with four RML 6 in (152 mm) 71 cwt guns as chase guns, two in the bow and another pair in the stern. They fired a 64-pound (29.0 kg), 6.3-inch (160 mm) shell. They also had six RBL 20 pdr 3.75-inch (95 mm) rifled breech-loading guns that were used as saluting guns. In 1878, the ships received four 14-inch (356 mm) torpedo launchers on the main deck and the 6-inch guns were replaced by four breech-loading BL 5-inch guns during the mid-1880s.

The wrought iron waterline armour belt of the Audacious class covered the entire length of the ships. It was eight inches (203 mm) thick amidships, backed by eight–ten inches (203–254 mm) of teak, and thinned to six inches towards the ends of the ships. It had a total height of 8 feet (2.4 m) of which 5 feet (1.5 m) was below water and 3 feet (0.9 m) above at deep load. The main deck citadel's ends were protected by a 5-inch (127 mm) forward bulkhead and a 4-inch (102 mm) one aft. The sides and embrasures of the upper battery were six inches thick, but its ends were unprotected. The ships also had a one-man conning tower with walls 3 inches (76 mm) thick.

== Construction and career ==
Iron Duke, named after the nickname for Arthur Wellesley, 1st Duke of Wellington, was the first ship of her name to serve in the Royal Navy. The ship was laid down at Pembroke Dockyard on 23 August 1868, launched on 1 March 1870 and was completed on 1 January 1871, at a cost of £208,763. She was initially assigned as a First Reserve Guardship at Plymouth, but was assigned as the flagship of the China Station in September. En route to the Far East, she became the first ironclad to use the Suez Canal; virtually all of her coal had to be unloaded to reduce her draught and she was towed by three tugboats through the canal in three days. Relieved by her sister ship, Audacious, Iron Duke returned to the UK in 1875. To save money on the return ship, no tugboats were hired and the ship ran aground four times and frequently scraped the sides of the canal during her four-day transit. Upon her arrival, she was paid off in May.

Iron Duke recommissioned two months later and was assigned as the guardship at Hull. During the First Reserve Squadron's summer cruise on 1 September, she was en route with three other ironclads between Dublin and Queenstown (now Cobh). In a thick fog, the ship accidentally rammed her sister, Vanguard, off Kish Bank, in Dublin Bay. Iron Duke had her bowsprit wrecked, but was otherwise little damaged. Her ram, however, had torn a 9-by-3-foot (2.74 by 0.91 m) hole in Vanguard's side. The ram also damaged the watertight bulkhead between Vanguard's engine and boiler rooms which flooded both compartments and prevented her crew from using her steam-powered pumps. The ship sank in a little over an hour after all of the crew had abandoned ship. Following the collision, Iron Duke was overhauled at Plymouth Dockyard, with attention being given to the watertight doors on board. At 10:00 on 20 November 1877, Iron Duke departed from Plymouth for sea trials. She was 3 nautical miles (5.6 km) out when it was found that the main sluice valve had been left open and she was sinking. Her crew closed the watertight doors and manned the pumps. An order was given to fire the distress signal, but it was found that there was no powder on board. The flag signal for "sinking" was made, but it was not noticed by HMS Black Prince for fifteen minutes. Black Prince repeated the signal to Mount Wise, which repeated the signal to Plymouth. In the meantime, a crewman had managed to close the valve. He was waist deep in water and had he been a few minutes later a diver would have been required. With the valve closed, the pumps were able to clear the water, and the ship was dry at 15:00. She put back to Plymouth, the trial being cancelled. It was subsequently revealed that four condenser valves, each 6 inches (150 mm) diameter were involved. Difficulty in closing them was caused by excessive stiffness in the springs. This was alleviated by the fact that the valve handles had been lengthened during the refit, giving greater leverage. It was reported that efforts were made by those responsible for the refit to obstruct the Admiralty enquiry into the event.

Following the loss, Iron Duke replaced Vanguard as the guardship at Kingstown, County Dublin, where she received the latter's crew and remained until July 1877 when the ship began a lengthy refit that lasted until August 1878. She was inspected by Admiral Thomas Symonds, Commander-in-Chief, Plymouth, on 22 July. Iron Duke then departed Plymouth on 4 August, bound for the China Station; en route, she pulled the P&O steamship Bengal off a reef in the Red Sea on 7 September after two days' effort. Vice-Admiral Robert Coote hoisted his flag aboard Iron Duke on 9 November. on 9 May 1879, she ran aground at the mouth of the Yangtze. She was refloated with assistance 36 hours later. Minor damage was sustained, and she sailed to Hiogo, Japan to be [dry]docked. Iron Duke ran aground on a sandbar entering the Huangpu River in May 1880, after five days, she was pulled free by the American paddlewheel river gunboat Monocacy with little damage. Princes Arisugawa Taruhito and Arisugawa Takehito visited Iron Duke on 22 July while she was visiting Yokohama, Japan. Several weeks later, Arisugawa Takehito came aboard to serve as a midshipman. The ship struck a rock off the coast of Hokkaido en route to Aniva Bay, Sakhalin Island, on 30 July 1880. She floated off on 1 August after the French cruiser Champlain had also grounded while trying to assist; her repairs required a month in drydock in Hong Kong. On 28 January 1881, Coote hauled down his flag and was relieved by Vice-Admiral George Willes, the new Commander-in-chief, of the China Station. On 10 October, the ship was drydocked in Nagasaki, Japan, and then sailed to Woosung, on 26 October. Iron Duke returned home in January 1883 and began a lengthy refit that included the replacement of her boilers.

On 16 April 1885, the ship became a member of Admiral Geoffrey Hornby's Particular Service Squadron until August, when she joined the Channel Squadron. After the ironclad Sultan broke loose from her anchors in Lisbon on 24 December 1886 during a gale and accidentally rammed and sank the French steamship Ville de Victoria, Iron Duke's crew manned one boat in search for survivors, although it is uncertain how many they saved. The following year, Iron Duke participated in Queen Victoria's Golden Jubilee Fleet review on 1 July 1887 at Spithead. She was reduced to reserve in 1890 and was converted to a coal hulk in 1900, serving at Kyles of Bute. The ship was transferred from Fleet Reserve to Dockyard Reserve at Portsmouth in April 1902, and eventually sold for scrap on 15 May 1906 to Galbraith of Glasgow.

== Bibliography ==
- Ballard, G. A. (1980). The Black Battlefleet. Naval Institute Press. ISBN 0-87021-924-3.
- Beeler, John (2001). Birth of the Battleship: British Capital Ship Design 1870–1881. Naval Institute Press. ISBN 1-55750-213-7.
- Colledge, J. J.; Warlow, Ben (2006) [1969]. Ships of the Royal Navy: The Complete Record of All Fighting Ships of the Royal Navy from the 15th Century to the Present (3rd Rev ed.). London: Chatham Publishing. ISBN 978-1-86176-281-8. OCLC 67375475.
- Friedman, Norman (2018). British Battleships of the Victorian Era. Naval Institute Press. ISBN 978-1-68247-329-0.
- Lyon, David & Winfield, Rif (2004). The Sail & Steam Navy List: All the Ships of the Royal Navy 1815–1889. Chatham Publishing. ISBN 1-86176-032-9.
- Parkes, Oscar (1990) [1966]. British Battleships, Warrior 1860 to Vanguard 1950: A History of Design, Construction, and Armament (New & rev. ed.). Naval Institute Press. ISBN 1-55750-075-4.
- Roberts, John (1979). "Great Britain (including Empire Forces)". In Chesneau, Roger & Kolesnik, Eugene M. (eds.). Conway's All the World's Fighting Ships 1860–1905. Mayflower Books. pp. 1–113. ISBN 0-8317-0302-4.
- Silverstone, Paul H. (1984). Directory of the World's Capital Ships. Hippocrene Books. ISBN 0-88254-979-0.
- Smith, J. J. (1883). In Eastern Seas; or, The Commission of H.M.S. Iron Duke: Flagship in China, 1878–83. A. H. Swiss. OCLC 669060334. "hms iron duke."
