= Vanguard Industries =

Clothing supplier

The Vanguard Industries Inc. is a supplier of military insignia and accouterments to the U.S. Army, Navy, Marine Corps, Coast Guard, Air Force, Public Health Service, NOAA, Coast Geodetic Survey, and Civil Air Patrol. Vanguard is a supplier of military insignia to the U.S. Military Exchange Services.

== History ==
Vanguard Industries, Inc. was founded in New York City in 1918 by Mr. Bernard Gershen. Arriving in the US in 1903, Bernard was a tailor who found work right on the piers of Brooklyn, NY at the Navy Yard, where Bernard soon began to specialize in sewing the gold lace onto the jackets of the ships’ captains and crew as they earned promotions. At the end of World War I, Sam Weisberg, whose business was selling buttons to Navy personnel, approached Mr. Gershen with the idea of forming their own company. Mr. Weisberg would specialize in buttons and other metal items, and Bernard would specialize in lace and other hand-sewn items.

From 1918 until the outbreak of [World War II], Vanguard was a supplier of insignia and accoutrements to the U.S. Navy and employed no more than ten people. With World War II looming in 1941, Vanguard responded to the dramatic increase in demand for military insignia by expanding to support all branches of the U.S. armed forces.

In 1985, Vanguard expanded to Carlsbad, California when it purchased the Wolf-Brown Corporation. Several years later another branch office opened in Kaneohe, Hawaii. In November 1996, Vanguard relocated its East Coast Headquarters to Norfolk Virginia in order to better support their military customers.

In July 2000, Vanguard purchased all the assets of N. S. Meyer, Inc. of New York City, which had been in operation since 1868. In 2009, Vanguard donated N. S. Meyer's vast collection of military insignia to the National Museum of the United States Army. Vanguard continues to be the Preeminent Manufacturer and Distributor of Military Insignia for all Branches of the US Armed Forces.

== Insignia Hallmarks ==
During the World War II period through the early 1950s, Vanguard used a hallmark on the back of its insignia that consisted of a stylized eagle, shield, and a “V” which sometimes included the name “Vanguard” in a scroll at the bottom. Some insignia simply had the words “Vanguard” and “N.Y.” This was replaced by the two digit code “1V” around 1953–54. Around 1964–65, the hallmark changed again to “V-21,” then in 1974 it changed to “V-21-N,” which is still in use today.
