= Vanguard School of Coconut Grove =

Private school in Florida, United States

Coordinates: 25.71820°N 80.2525°W

Information
- Motto: Never, Never Quit
- Established: 1968; 58 years ago
- Website: www.vanguardschool.com

The Vanguard School of Coconut Grove is an accredited private day school in Coconut Grove, Florida. It focuses on children with learning disabilities and other learning issues that have average or above average IQs.

== History ==
Vanguard was licensed in 1961 from the original Vanguard School in Pennsylvania. It was established in 1968 and then separated and reorganized from the original school in 1983.
