= Vanguard School (Quebec) =

Coordinates: 45.4920°N 73.6840°W

Location
- 5935 chemin de la Côte-de-Liesse; Saint-Laurent, Quebec, H4T 1C3; Canada

Information
- School type: High School
- Principal: Annie Lamarre
- Grades: Secondary I-V
- Language: French & English
- Colours: Black, Red, Gray, Blue
- Team name: Titans
- Website: www.vanguardquebec.qc.ca

Vanguard School is a high school and elementary school situated in Saint-Laurent, Quebec on the Island of Montreal.

Vanguard School is the only school to offer an elementary and high school program in two languages of instruction for 7 to 16 years-olds with severe learning disabilities by offering them the resources that will enable them to learn and to experience academic success.

Vanguard School is a private school declared in the public interest, it offers adapted educational services, in English or in French, to students with severe learning disabilities. The School offers a regular program of instruction, as set by the Ministry of Education, Leisure and Sports, to students at the elementary and secondary levels.

== History ==
The school's first location was built in September 1992 with 2 classes filled of 28 students. It was divided of French and English students, therefore a French and English sector of the school. It is a private school and has its own school board. There is another Vanguard High School, it is an all-French school located in Laval, Quebec. The school has a strong rule for uniforms, the colors are navy blue, beige and white.

Mr. Paul E Zimmerman started a Vanguard system in Montreal, Quebec through Doctor Samuel Rabinovitch who worked at McGill's Education Facility at the Montreal Children's Hospital. Mr. Paul E Zimmerman was unable to find such service in the Montreal region, so he sent his son in the Vanguard school in the United States. With the help of Doctor Samuel Rabinovitch, they were able to create a Vanguard system in Montreal. They opened an elementary school called Vanguard School of Quebec in 1973 which is located in Saint-Laurent, Quebec.

In 2012, the administration decided to move all of its facilities into one location and to adjust its name to Vanguard School. In September 2012, Vanguard School Corporation acquired a building at 5935 chemin de la Côte-de-Liesse in the borough of Saint-Laurent. The elementary classes moved into the new location in March 2013, and the secondary students moved in September 2013.

Vanguard School has two sports teams, a soccer and football team called The Diablos. Their first winning in history of their sports team was the Girls' Soccer team (AA) in 2006.
