= HMS Vanguard (1870) =

Audacious-class central-battery ironclad

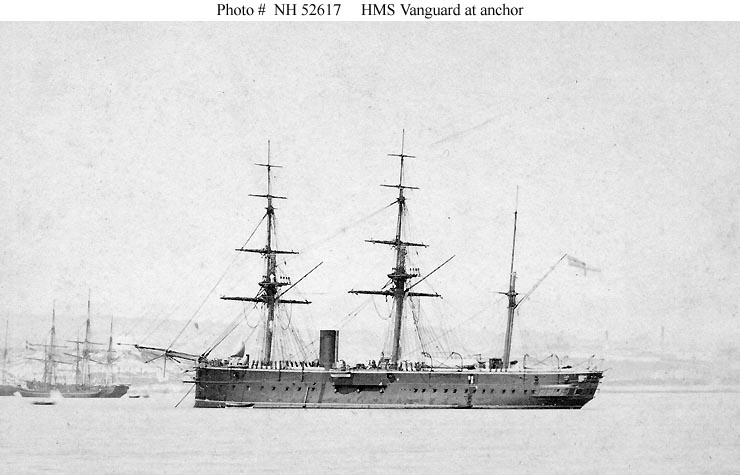
- Vanguard

History

United Kingdom
- Name: Vanguard
- Builder: Laird, Son & Co., Birkenhead
- Laid down: 21 October 1867
- Launched: 3 January 1870
- Commissioned: 28 September 1870
- Fate: Sunk in an accident, 1 September 1875

General characteristics
- Class & type: Audacious-class ironclad battleship
- Displacement: 6,034 long tons (6,131 t)
- Length: 342 ft 3 in (104.32 m)
- Beam: 54 ft (16 m)
- Draught: 23 ft 2 in (7.06 m)
- Installed power: 6 × Cochrane boilers; 4,830 ihp (3,600 kW)
- Propulsion: 2 × coal-fired Ravenhill reciprocating steam engines; 2 × shafts
- Sail plan: Full-rigged ship
- Speed: 13 kn (15 mph; 24 km/h)
- Complement: 450
- Armament: 10 × 9 in (230 mm), 12-ton RML guns; 4 × 6 in (150 mm), 64 pdr (29 kg) RML 'chaser' guns (two at bow and two at stern); 6 × 20 pdr (9.1 kg) guns, bow ram
- Armour: Belt: 6–8 in (15–20 cm); Battery: 4–6 in (10–15 cm); Bulkheads: 4–5 in (10–13 cm)
- Notes: Armour is iron plating with teak backing.

The eighth HMS Vanguard of the British Royal Navy was an Audacious-class central battery ironclad battleship, by Edward Reed launched in 1870. In 1875, the ship was sunk during a summer cruise in a collision in fog with the ironclad HMS Iron Duke. None of the crew were lost, but the commanding officer of the ship never commanded another vessel in his career. The wreck lies near the Kish lightship off the coast of Ireland and is protected under the Irish National Monument Act.

== Design and construction ==
Vanguard was 280 feet (85 m) long between perpendiculars. She had a beam of 54 feet (16 m) and a draught of 22 feet (6.7 m) forward and 23 feet (7.0 m) aft. The ship normally displaced 6,010 long tons (6,110 t).

== Propulsion ==
Vanguard had two sets of 2-cylinder horizontal single expansion, return connecting-rod and 6 rectangular boilers that drove twin screws. The engine had a total designed output of 4,830 indicated horsepower (3,600 kW) which gave Vanguard a maximum speed of 14.65 knots (27.13 km/h; 16.86 mph).

== Armament ==
Her armament consisted of ten 9-inch (230 mm) 12-ton MLR guns all in a two-tier central battery where six were on MD and two on UD. Furthermore she had four 6-inch (150 mm)/64-pounder (71 cwt) MLR on UD, with two forward and two aft and six 20-pounder guns for saluting.

== Service history ==
Vanguard — under the command of Captain Richard Dawkins, sailed out of Kingstown (now Dún Laoghaire) harbour on 27 August 1875 in company with three other ironclads, Warrior, Hector and Iron Duke. The ships were part of the First Reserve Squadron and were on a summer cruise around the Irish coast. The squadron — under the command of Admiral Tarleton, was en route to Queenstown (Cobh), County Cork where the cruise would finish. As they passed the Kish lightship, a heavy fog came down which restricted visibility to less than a ship's length. Vanguard's sister ship — Iron Duke — noticed she was drifting off course and began returning to her proper station. A problem with her steam plant rendered her foghorn inoperable, and could not be used to alert the other vessels of her position or course. At about 12:50, a look-out on Vanguard spotted a sailing ship directly ahead. As Vanguard turned to avoid it, Iron Duke appeared out of the fog on her port side less than 40 yards (37 m) away. Collision was unavoidable. Iron Duke's underwater ram tore open Vanguard's hull near her boilers.

Iron Duke freed herself after a few minutes, sustaining only minor damage. Vanguard, however, was sinking. Her pumps could move water at a rate of 3,000 lb/min (23 kg/s) but the flooding exceeded 50 long tons per minute (847 kg/s). The pumps were powered by the engines, which shut down ten minutes after the collision when the engine room flooded.

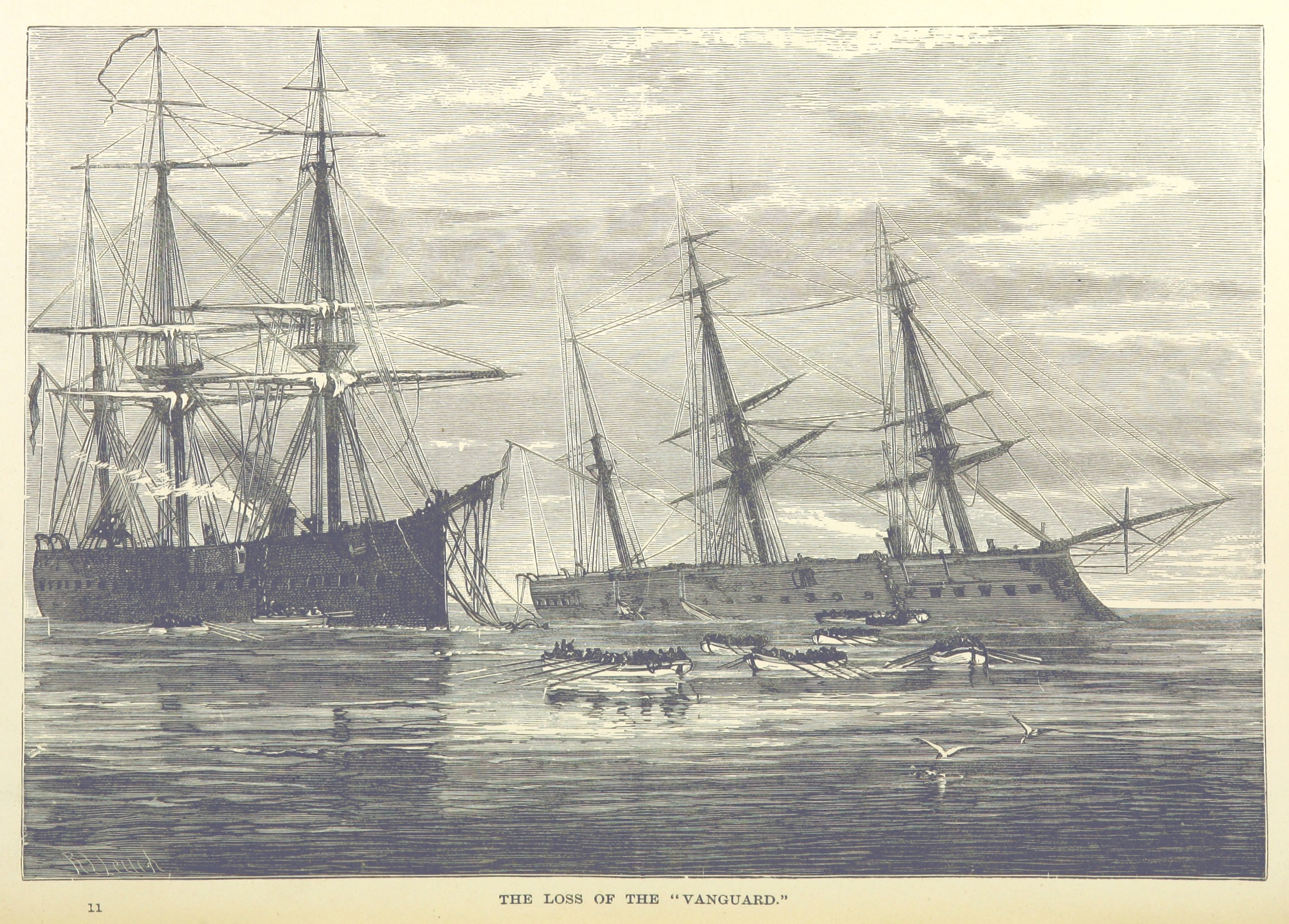
HMS Vanguard (right) sinking. HMS Iron Duke is on the left

Vanguard and Iron Duke both launched all boats. The abandonment was completed in good order with Captain Dawkins the last of the 360 crew aboard to leave and the only casualty was his dog which was lost. Warrior and Hector sailed on in the fog and only learned of the sinking upon reaching Queenstown.

Seventy minutes after the collision, Vanguard rested on the seabed 165 ft (50 m) deep. The tips of her masts were still visible above the surface. The Admiralty was confident that the ship could be raised and diving operations started, but were soon abandoned. Captain Dawkins was blamed at the court martial for not doing enough to save his vessel following the collision, and never received command of another vessel. Contemporary popular opinion, however, was sympathetic towards him.

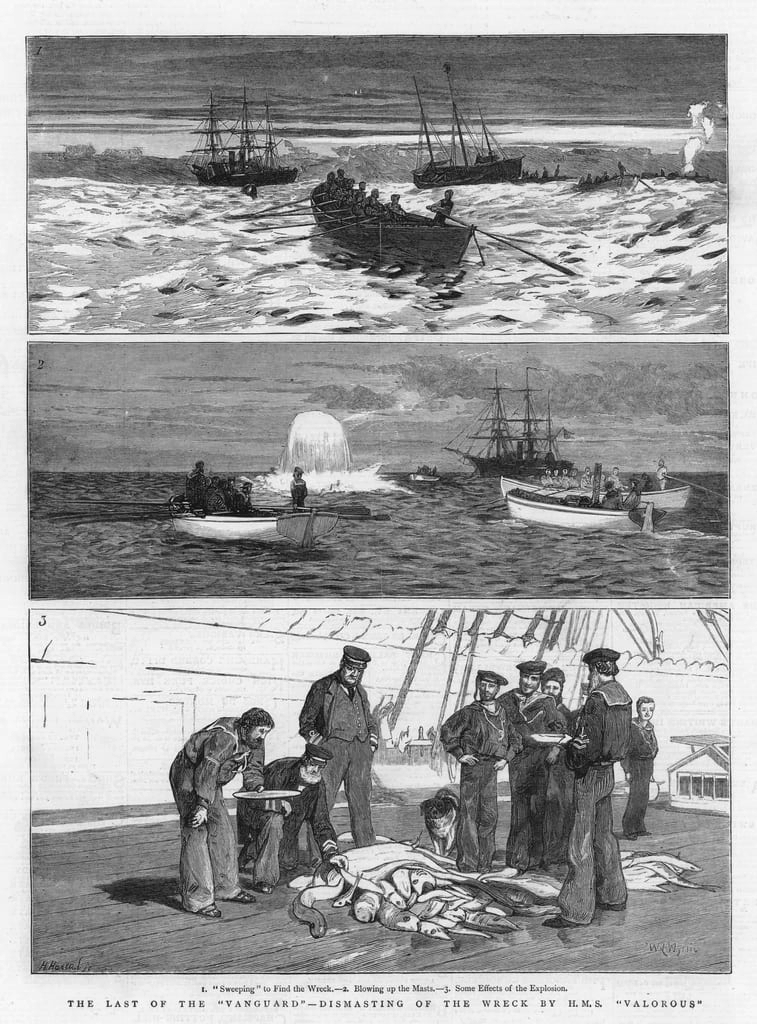
The last of the Vanguard, dismasting of the wreck by HMS Valorous. The Graphic 1879

The wreck was rediscovered in 1985 and lies in 148–165 ft (45–50 m) of water. The wreck is protected under the Irish National Monument Act, and a licence from the National Monuments Service is required to dive it.
