= Vanguard Military School =

Location
- 8 Rothwell Avenue, Rosedale; Auckland, 0632; 36.75188°S 174.69857°E

Information
- Established: September 2013
- Principal: Steve Mueller
- Gender: Co-educational
- Website: https://vanguard.school.nz/

Vanguard Military School is a co-educational school located on the North Shore of Auckland, New Zealand. Serving years 11 to 13, the school was one of five new government partnership (charter) schools being implemented across New Zealand in 2014. It transitioned into a state designated character school in 2019.

== History ==
Vanguard Military School opened in February 2014 as one of the Fifth National Government's new partnership schools. It is a senior secondary school that catered for year 11 and 12 students in its foundation year before expanding to take year 13 students in 2015. The school was established by Nick Hyde, owner of a private training group, Advance Training Centres Limited. It was one of the schools followed up on the issue of governance fees claimed by owners of charter schools in 2015 The school was chosen by David Seymour as the site for his announcement of funding for a new round of charter schools beginning in 2025.

Following the election of the Sixth Labour Government in October 2017, the partnership school model was disestablished. Vanguard subsequently opted to become a section 156 designated character state school starting in the 2019 school year.

As of 27 November 2023, the Sixth National Government reintroduced charter schools as part of a coalition agreement between the New Zealand National Party and ACT New Zealand. Associate Minister of Education David Seymour is responsible specifically for charter schools.
