= Extended School Year =

Special education services for students with disabilities

In the United States, Extended School Year (ESY) services are special education services occurring outside the typical 180-day school year. They are provided by local education agencies (LEAs) to children with Individualized Education Programs (IEPs).

The services are designed to support a student with a disability as documented under the Individuals with Disabilities Education Act (IDEA) to maintain the academic, social/behavioral, communication, or other skills that they have learned as part of their IEP or Section 504 accommodation plan.

Services may be provided when school is not normally in session, but not always. Sometimes they are built into the school day. Typically, they are provided during summer. Holiday breaks and after school are options too.

In order for a student to receive ESY services, the student must have evidenced substantial regression and recoupment issues during the previous IEP year and/or there is evidence of emerging skills which are often referred to as "breakthrough" skills. The focus of the services provided to the student as part of an ESY program are generally not upon learning new skills or "catching up" to grade level, but rather to provide practice to maintain previously acquired or learned skills.

In some cases ESY is focused on continuing education for students whose rate of progress is insufficient to enable effective progress during the regular school year. If a student has received ESY services in previous years the student may not be eligible in future years as determinations for eligibility of ESY services are made annually by the IEP or 504 plan, which includes the parent and student of age 16 or older.

Parents can keep notes about any loss of skill during a break from school. By tracking how long it takes to recover a skill, parents can provide data for a discussion about whether additional services are necessary.

In 2022, a study found significant differences in the percentage of students receiving ESY services by locale, with rural local education agencies (LEAs) having a lower percentage. Urban special education directors reported higher attendance rates of students receiving ESY services, while rural LEAs provided fewer types of services. Another study found that students with IEPs and those receiving summer ESY services had significantly higher academic achievement. This was particularly impacted by the COVID-19 pandemic, which disrupted learning for many students.
