= Vanguard School (Florida) =

The Vanguard School
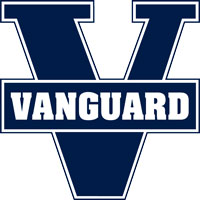

Location
- 22000 US 27; Lake Wales, FL; Central Florida; Lake Wales, FL 33859; United States

Information
- School type: Private, Nonprofit, Neurodiverse, Boarding school, and Day School
- Motto: Preparing diverse learners to thrive in a diverse world.
- Established: 1966
- Founder: Harry Nelson
- Dean: Dr. Jae Allen
- Head of school: Mr. L. Shannon Graves
- Grades: 6th to 12th
- Gender: All Gender
- Age: 11 to 20
- Average class size: 6 to 8 students
- Student to teacher ratio: 6-8:1 (median number)
- Language: English
- Campus size: Approximately 77 Acres
- Campus type: Semi-rural
- Athletics: Tennis, Basketball, Soccer, Golf, Swimming, Track and Field, Cross Country, Weightlifting, Archery
- Mascot: Panthers
- Accreditation: FCIS, Cognia
- Phone Number: (863) 676-6091
- Website: http://www.vanguardschool.org/

The Vanguard School is an independent, non-profit, co-educational boarding school and day school located on a 75-acre campus in Lake Wales, Florida. Vanguard serves students in grades 6–12 and specializes in supporting neurodiverse students with learning differences, including dyslexia, ADHD, autism spectrum disorder, processing disorders, and executive functioning challenges. A formal clinical diagnosis is not required for admission.

== History ==
Vanguard's origins date back to 1960, when it began as an after-school tutorial program in suburban Philadelphia led by Dr. Milton Brutten and Dr. Henry Evans to provide specialized instruction for students with dyslexia.

The Florida campus was established in Lake Wales in 1966 by Elinor "Ellie" Carnill-Steinhilber and William "Bill" Carnhill II. Carnhill, a resident of the nearby Mountain Lake community and the father of a Vanguard student, garnered support from his neighbors to help develop Vanguard's Florida campus. Under the leadership of its first principal, Harry E. Nelson, Vanguard implemented a curriculum specifically tailored to the individual needs of its students.

In 1975, Vanguard received accreditation by the Florida Council of Independent Schools. Vanguard was also incorporated as an independent Florida Non-Profit organization.
