= 2014 Chatham Cup =

Knockout Football competition

Tournament details
- Country: New Zealand

Final positions
- Champions: Cashmere Technical
- Runners-up: Central United

Awards
- Jack Batty Memorial Trophy: Stu Kelly

The 2014 Chatham Cup was New Zealand's 87th annual knockout football competition.

The 2014 competition had five rounds proper before quarter-finals, semi-finals, and a final. The final, played on 7 September 2014, was won by Christchurch club Cashmere Technical, who beat Central United 2–1 for their second trophy in two years, the first club to go back to back since 1998. The Jack Batty Memorial Cup for man of the final was won by Cashmere Technical's Stu Kelly.

== Results ==
All results and dates are taken from the following sources: The Ultimate New Zealand Soccer Website, RSSSF, Capital Football and Soccerway.

=== Preliminary round ===
Northern Region

21 April 2014	Bucklands Beach	4–2	Te Kuiti Albion	Lloyd Elsmore Park, Pakuranga Heights

21 April 2014	Drury United	0–8	Mt Albert Grammar	Drury Sports Complex, Drury

21 April 2014	Glen Eden United	1–2	Manukau City	Parrs Park, Auckland

21 April 2014	Kerikeri	2–1	Air Force	Baysport Waipapa, Waipapa

21 April 2014	Matamata Swifts	1–4	Rotorua United	Matamata Domain, Matamata

21 April 2014	Nixon Park	0–7	Hukanui Rototuna

21 April 2014	Papamoa	5–0	High School Old Boys	Gordon Spratt Reserve, Tauranga

21 April 2014	Ranui Swanson	3–0	Puhoi	Starling Park, West Auckland

21 April 2014	South Auckland Rangers	4–3	West Auckland	Rongomai Park, Manukau

21 April 2014	West Hamilton United	0–4	Pukekohe	Weka Street, Hamilton

21 April 2014	Zamantix Rovers	2–4	Bohemian Celtic	Michaels Avenue Reserve, Ellerslie

Mainland Region

21 April 2014	Nelson College	2–1	Wakefield	Nelson College, Nelson

All teams listed below received byes to the second round.

Northern Region: Albany United, Auckland University, Beachlands Maraetai, Cambridge, Claudelands Rovers, Eastern Suburbs, Ellerslie, FC Whangarei, Fencibles United, Forrest Hill-Milford United, Hibiscus Coast, Lynn-Avon United, Mangere United, Manurewa, Melville United, Metro, Mt. Albert-Ponsonby, Ngongotaha, North Shore United, Onehunga-Mangere United, Oratia United, Otahuhu United, Otumoetai, Papakura City, Papatoetoe, Takapuna, Taradale, Tauranga City United, Te Atatu, Waiheke United, Waitemata City, Waiuku, Warkworth, Western Springs
Central/Capital Region: Brooklyn Northern United, Douglas Villa, Eastbourne, Havelock North Wanderers, Island Bay United, Marist Palmerston North, Marist Wellington, Miramar Rangers, Naenae, Napier City Rovers, North Wellington, Petone, Red Sox Manawatu, Seatoun, Stokes Valley, Stop Out, Tawa, Victoria University, Wainuiomata, Wairarapa United, Wanganui Athletic, Waterside Karori, Wellington Olympic, Wellington United, Western Suburbs
Mainland/Southern Region: Burwood, Canterbury University, Cashmere Technical, Central Pirates, Christchurch United, Coastal Spirit, Dunedin Technical, FC Nelson, Ferrymead Bays, Halswell United, Invercargill Old Boys, Invercargill Thistle, Melchester Rovers, Mosgiel, Nomads United, Northern, Northern Hearts, Otago University, Parklands United, Pleasant Point, Queens Park, Queenstown Rovers, Richmond Athletic, Selwyn United, Southend United, Waihopai, Waimakariri United, West End, Western

All teams listed below received byes to the third round.

Northern Region: Bay Olympic, Birkenhead United, Central United, East Coast Bays, Glenfield Rovers, Hamilton Wanderers, Ngaruawahia United, Onehunga Sports, Three Kings United, Waitakere City
Central/Capital Region: Lower Hutt City, Palmerston North End, Upper Hutt City
Mainland/Southern Region: Roslyn Wakari

=== Round 1 ===
All results and dates are taken from the following sources: The Ultimate New Zealand Soccer Website, RSSSF, Capital Football and Soccerway.

Northern Region

10/11 May 2014	Hibiscus Coast	4–2	Bohemian Celtic	Stanmore Bay Park, Whangaparaoa

10/11 May 2014	Te Atatu	0–3	North Shore United	Te Atatū Peninsula Park, Auckland

10/11 May 2014	Rotorua United	3–4	South Auckland Rangers	Neil Hunt Park, Rotorua

10/11 May 2014	Ranui Swanson	0–3	Hukanui Rototuna Clube Alegria	Starling Park, West Auckland

10/11 May 2014	Whangarei	0–3	Western Springs	Rawhiti Street Reserve, Whangārei

10/11 May 2014	Manurewa	3–0	Waiheke United	War Memorial Park, Auckland

10/11 May 2014	Cambridge	1–4	Mangere United	John Kerkhof Park, Cambridge

10/11 May 2014	Melville United	5–1	Auckland University	Gower Park, Hamilton

10/11 May 2014	Tauranga City United	4–3	Manukau City	Links Avenue, Mount Maunganui

10/11 May 2014	Lynn-Avon United	6–2	Otahuhu United	Ken Maunder Park, Auckland

10/11 May 2014	Forrest Hill Milford United	12–1	Papamoa	Becroft Park, North Shore

10/11 May 2014	Bucklands Beach	1–3	Mt Albert Ponsonby	Lloyd Elsmore Park, Pakuranga Heights

10/11 May 2014	Papakura City	3–2	Takapuna	McLennan Park, Auckland

10/11 May 2014	Kerikeri	2–7	Mount Albert Grammar School	Baysport Waipapa, Waipapa

10/11 May 2014	Onehunga-Mangere United	3–1	Papatoetoe	Māngere Domain, Māngere

10/11 May 2014	Otumoetai	0–5	Waiuku	Fergusson Park, Tauranga

10/11 May 2014	Claudelands Rovers	2–0	Albany United	Galloway Park, Hamilton

10/11 May 2014	Oratia United	2–4	Metro	Parrs Park, West Auckland

10/11 May 2014	Beachlands Maraetai	0–7	Fencibles United	Te Puru Park, Beachlands

10/11 May 2014	Ellerslie	4–0	Warkworth	Michaels Avenue Reserve, Ellerslie

10/11 May 2014	Eastern Suburbs	4–0	Waitemata City	Madills Farm, Auckland

10/11 May 2014	Pukekohe	3–4	Ngongotaha	Bledisloe Park, Pukekohe

Central / Capital Region

10/11 May 2014	Victoria University	2–0	Red Sox Manawatu	Boyd Wilson Turf, Wellington

10/11 May 2014	Wainuiomata	7–0	Eastbourne	Richard Prouse Park, Lower Hutt

10/11 May 2014	Palmerston North Marist	2–1	Stop Out	Memorial Park, Palmerston North

10/11 May 2014	Western Suburbs	1–0	Petone	Endeavour Park, Porirua

10/11 May 2014	Wellington Olympic	12–0	North Wellington	Wakefield Park, Wellington

10/11 May 2014	Douglas Villa	0–6	Havelock North Wanderers	Queen Elizabeth Park, Masterton

10/11 May 2014	Taradale	1–2	Napier City Rovers	Taradale Park, Napier

10/11 May 2014	Waterside Karori	7–1	Brooklyn Northern United	Karori Park, Wellington

10/11 May 2014	Stokes Valley	3–2	Naenae	Delaney Park, Lower Hutt

10/11 May 2014	Wairarapa United	11–0	Wellington Marist	Memorial Park, Masterton

10/11 May 2014	Wellington United	1–3	Island Bay United	Newtown Park, Wellington

10/11 May 2014	Seatoun	0–3	Tawa	Seatoun Park, Wellington

10/11 May 2014	Napier Marist	default	North End
Note: North End won after Napier Marist by defaulted

10/11 May 2014	Miramar Rangers	7–2	Wanganui Athletic	David Farrington Park, Wellington

Mainland / Southern Region

10/11 May 2014	Nelson Suburbs	0–3	Richmond Athletic	Saxton Field, Nelson

10/11 May 2014	Central Pirates	2–4	Nelson College

10/11 May 2014	Selwyn United	2–4	Nomads United	Foster Park, Christchurch

10/11 May 2014	Christchurch United	1–2	Universities	Christchurch Football Centre, Christchurch

10/11 May 2014	Waimakariri United	3–4	Burwood	Rangiora A&P Showgrounds, Rangiora

10/11 May 2014	Parklands United	0–5	Halswell United	Parklands Reserve, Christchurch

10/11 May 2014	Ferrymead Bays	2–2 (a.e.t.) (4–5 p)	Cashmere Technical	Ferrymead Park, Christchurch

10/11 May 2014	Coastal Spirit	2–1	Western	Cuthberts Green, Christchurch

10/11 May 2014	Pleasant Point	2–0	Waihopai	Pleasant Point Domain, Pleasant Point

10/11 May 2014	Mosgiel	14–1	Invercargill Thistle	Memorial Park, Mosgiel

10/11 May 2014	Dunedin Technical	3–2	Northern	Culling Park, Dunedin

10/11 May 2014	Invercargill Old Boys	3–0	Queens Park	Waverley Park, Invercargill

10/11 May 2014	Queenstown Rovers	1–5	Northern Hearts	Queenstown Events Centre, Queenstown

10/11 May 2014	Otago University	3–1	Melchester Rovers	Caledonian Ground, Dunedin

10/11 May 2014	West End	2–0	Southend United	West End Park, Timaru

=== Round 2 ===
All results and dates are taken from the following sources: The Ultimate New Zealand Soccer Website, RSSSF, Capital Football and Soccerway.

Northern Region

2 June 2014	Mt Albert Ponsonby	0–2	North Shore United	Anderson Park, Auckland

2 June 2014	Bay Olympic	2–1	Three Kings United	Olympic Park, Auckland

2 June 2014	Mangere United	0–3*	Hamilton Wanderers
Note: Mangere had won the match 5–4 on penalties after it finished 3-all at the end of extra time, however the result was overturned after they were found to have fielded an ineligible player. Mangere appealed the decision, delaying the next two rounds matches before New Zealand Football came to a decision to forfeit the match and declare a 3–0 win to Hamilton Wanderers.

2 June 2014	Mount Albert Grammar School	1–4	Onehunga Sports

2 June 2014	Ngongotaha	4–2	South Auckland Rangers	Tamarahi Reserve, Ngongotahā

2 June 2014	Glenfield Rovers	2–1	Eastern Suburbs	McFetridge Park, North Shore

2 June 2014	Hibiscus Coast	1–0	Manurewa	Stanmore Bay Park, Whangaparaoa

2 June 2014	Ngaruawahia United	1–2	East Coast Bays	Centennial Park, Ngaruawahia

2 June 2014	Melville United	3–1	Forrest Hill Milford United	Gower Park, Hamilton

2 June 2014	Waitakere City	4–0	Hukanui Rototuna	Fred Taylor Park, Waitākere

2 June 2014	Papakura City	1–4	Central United	McLennan Park, Auckland

2 June 2014	Claudelands Rovers	1–4	Metro	Galloway Park, Hamilton

2 June 2014	Onehunga-Mangere United	0–4	Birkenhead United	Māngere Domain, Māngere

2 June 2014	Ellerslie	5–1	Waiuku	Michaels Avenue Reserve, Ellerslie

2 June 2014	Lynn-Avon United	0–8	Tauranga City	Ken Maunder Park, Auckland

2 June 2014	Fencibles United	1–3	Western Springs	Riverhills Domain, Auckland

Central / Capital Region

2 June 2014	Victoria University	3–0	North End	Boyd Wilson Turf, Wellington

2 June 2014	Napier City Rovers	5–4	Wellington Olympic	Bluewater Stadium, Napier

2 June 2014	Miramar Rangers	1–0	Western Suburbs	David Farrington Park, Wellington

2 June 2014	Waterside Karori	1–3	Tawa	Karori Park, Wellington

2 June 2014	Havelock North Wanderers	0–5	Palmerston North Marist	Guthrie Park, Havelock North

2 June 2014	Stokes Valley	1–4	Lower Hutt City	Delaney Park, Lower Hutt

2 June 2014	Island Bay United	1–0	Wainuiomata	Wakefield Park, Wellington

2 June 2014	Upper Hutt City	2–0	Wairarapa United	Maidstone Park, Upper Hutt

Mainland / Southern

2 June 2014	Richmond Athletic	2–0	Nelson College	Jubilee Park, Richmond

2 June 2014	Coastal Spirit	1–0	Nomads United	Cuthberts Green, Christchurch

2 June 2014	Universities	0–4	Halswell United	Ilam Field, Christchurch

2 June 2014	Burwood	0–9	Cashmere Technical	Clare Park, Christchurch

2 June 2014	Invercargill Old Boys	0–2	Otago University	Waverley Park, Invercargill

2 June 2014	Northern Hearts	5–0	Mosgiel	Aorangi Stadium, Timaru

2 June 2014	West End	2–3	Pleasant Point	West End Park, Timaru

2 June 2014	Dunedin Technical	4–2	Roslyn-Wakari	Culling Park, Dunedin

=== Round 3 ===
All results and dates are taken from the following sources: The Ultimate New Zealand Soccer Website, RSSSF, Capital Football, Soccerway and New Zealand Football.

Northern Region

13/14 June 2014	Metro	0–2	Onehunga Sports	Phyllis Street Reserve, Auckland
			Ming; Hoedemaker

13/14 June 2014	Glenfield Rovers	3–0	Ellerslie	McFetridge Park, North Shore
	Bale (pen.); Pearce

13/14 June 2014	Hibiscus Coast	2–3	Ngongotaha	Stanmore Bay Park, Whangaparaoa
	Langford		Haua; O'Donoghue

13/14 June 2014	Birkenhead United	3–4	Central United	Shepherds Park, North Shore
	Hobson-McVeigh; Turner		Tade (pen.) (pen.); Zambrano

13/14 June 2014	East Coast Bays	2–3	Tauranga City	Bay City Park, North Shore
	Wynne; Hoffman		O'Regan; Hughes; Culpepper

13/14 June 2014	Western Springs	1–2	Bay Olympic	Seddon Fields, Auckland
	Mulrooney		Jones; White

13/14 June 2014	Waitakere City	0–1	Melville United	Fred Taylor Park, Waitākere
			Kipara

29 June 2014	North Shore United	1–3	Hamilton Wanderers	Allen Hill Stadium, North Shore
	Sillars		Jones (pen.)
Note: The match was originally meant to be played on Sunday 15 June but Mangere United appealed the original decision to award Hamilton Wanderers the win in the previous round. After the appeal didn't result in the decision being overturned, the game was rescheduled for Sunday 29 June.

Central / Capital

13/14 June 2014	Lower Hutt City	1–2	Miramar Rangers	Bell Park, Lower Hutt
	Hailemariam 72'		Elia 52'; Fleming 70'

13/14 June 2014	Napier City Rovers	3–3 (a.e.t.) (5–4 p)	Palmerston North Marist	Bluewater Stadium, Napier
	Tinsley (pen.); John; Bevin		Tuck; Galyer; Milne

13/14 June 2014	Tawa	1–0	Upper Hutt City	Redwood Park, Wellington
	Ramaekers 5'

13/14 June 2014	Island Bay United	2–1	Victoria University	Wakefield Park, Wellington
	Barcia 22'; 74' (o.g.)		Wilson 8'

Mainland / Southern

13/14 June 2014	Richmond Athletic	1–2	Coastal Spirit	Jubilee Park, Richmond
	Hollis		Jones

13/14 June 2014	Cashmere Technical	2–1	Halswell United	Garrick Memorial Park, Christchurch
	Barton		Neame

13/14 June 2014	Otago University	4–0	Northern Hearts	Caledonian Ground, Dunedin
	Rae; Glover; Mark

13/14 June 2014	Dunedin Technical	11–1	Pleasant Point	Culling Park, Dunedin
	Rickerby; McBride; Flaws; Burgess; Houghton; McCormack		Tarrant

=== Round 4 ===
All results and dates are taken from the following sources: The Ultimate New Zealand Soccer Website, RSSSF, Capital Football, Soccerway and New Zealand Football.

Northern Region

28 June 2014	Central United	3–1	Glenfield Rovers	Kiwitea Street, Auckland
	Tade 42', 86'; Hoyt 90+4'		Beard 5'

29 June 2014	Tauranga City	0–2	Onehunga Sports	Links Avenue, Mount Maunganui
			Ming; Lovemore

29 June 2014	Ngongotaha	1–2	Melville United	Tamarahi Reserve, Ngongotahā
	Willemsen 48'		Williams 23'; Newell 67'

5 July 2014	Bay Olympic	2–3	Hamilton Wanderers	Olympic Park, Auckland
14:00	Manko		Konings; Broderson
Note: Game was delayed due to previous protest and delays.

Central / Capital

28 June 2014	Island Bay United	3–2	Miramar Rangers	Wakefield Park, Wellington
	Barbero 20'; Holmes 41'; Colucci 71'		Fa'arodo 13'; Fleming 59'

29 June 2014	Tawa	2–4	Napier City Rovers	Redwood Park, Wellington
	Ramaekers 18'; Kyne 89'		Greatholder 5'; Bevin 25'; John 41'; Kilkolly 63' (pen.)

Mainland / Southern

28 June 2014	Coastal Spirit	0–1	Cashmere Technical	Cuthberts Green, Christchurch
			Schwarz 78' (pen.)

28 June 2014	Dunedin Technical	1–0	Otago University	Culling Park, Dunedin
	Hayman 78'

=== Quarter-finals ===
All results and dates are taken from the following sources: The Ultimate New Zealand Soccer Website, RSSSF, Capital Football and Soccerway.

26-27 July 2014	Central United	2–0	Hamilton Wanderers	Kiwitea Street, Auckland
	Tade

26-27 July 2014	Melville United	1–2	Onehunga Sports	Gower Park, Hamilton
	Te Pou		Lovemore; Culpan

26-27 July 2014	Island Bay United	1–4	Napier City Rovers	Wakefield Park, Wellington
	Holmes		Tinsley; Stevenson; Bevin

26-27 July 2014	Dunedin Technical	0–3	Cashmere Technical	Culling Park, Dunedin
			Clapham; Wellbourn; Evans

=== Semi-finals ===
All results and dates are taken from the following sources: The Ultimate New Zealand Soccer Website, RSSSF, Capital Football and Soccerway.

16 August 2014	Onehunga Sports	0–4	Cashmere Technical	Waikaraka Park, Auckland
			Wellbourn; Boys; Barton

17 August 2014	Central United	2–0	Napier City Rovers	Kiwitea Street, Auckland
	Reimann; Hoyt

=== Final ===
Results and date are taken from the following sources: The Ultimate New Zealand Soccer Website, RSSSF, Capital Football and Soccerway.

==== Details ====
7 September 2014
14:30

Central United	1–2	Cashmere Technical
Tade 15'	One News Report	Wellbourn 5'; Terris 40'

North Harbour Stadium, Albany
Attendance: 2,671
Referee: Chris Kerr (Auckland)

Central United	Cashmere Technical

GK	Blaz Bugarin
DF	Joseph Dawkins (c)
DF	Ivan Vicelich
DF	Kim Dae-wook
MF	Finn Cochran
MF	Adam McGeorge	(substituted off) 51'
MF	Dean Lausev	(substituted off) 87'
MF	Takuya Iwata
FW	Fabrizio Tavano	(substituted off) 75'
FW	Emiliano Tade
FW	Karl Reimann
Substitutes:
MF	Regont Murati	(substituted on) 87'
FW	James Hoyt	(substituted on) 75'
MF	Mario Ilich	(substituted on) 51'
Manager:
José Figueira

GK	Danny Knight
DF	Dan Terris
DF	Dan Schwarz
DF	Tom Schwarz (c)
DF	Danny Boys
MF	Nick Wortelboer	(substituted off) 80'
MF	Stu Kelly
MF	Aaron Clapham
FW	Julyan Collett
FW	Ash Wellbourn	(substituted on) 85'
FW	Shawn O’Brien	(substituted on) 61'
Substitutes:
MF	Jordan Halligan	(substituted on) 80'
FW	Cory Mitchell	(substituted on) 85'
FW	Andy Barton	(substituted on) 61'
Manager:
John Brown

Jack Batty Memorial Cup:
Stu Kelly

Assistant referees:
Jan-Hendrik Hintz
Simon Lount

Match rules

- 90 minutes.
- 30 minutes of extra-time if necessary.
- Penalty shoot-out if scores still level.
- Maximum of three substitutions.
