= 2010 Chatham Cup =

Tournament details
- Venue(s): North Harbour Stadium, North Shore
- Dates: 7 June – 12 September 2010

Final positions
- Champions: Miramar Rangers (4th title)
- Runners-up: Bay Olympic

Awards
- Jack Batty Memorial Cup: Phil Imray (Miramar Rangers)

The 2010 Chatham Cup is New Zealand's 83rd knockout football competition.

The 2010 competition had a preliminary round, a qualification round, and four rounds proper before quarter-finals, semi-finals, and a final. In all, 135 teams took part in the 2010 competition.

== Draw controversies ==
There were several problems with the draw of teams for specific ties in the 2010 Chatham Cup.

The neutrality of the allotment of teams to specific ties was drawn into question by some observers in the Second Round. A coincidence and a computer glitch combined to produce an "early draft" of the ties which included one of the fixtures later replicated in the live draw.

The third round also saw controversy when the draw had to be re-made. Initially, teams were not divided geographically for the Third Round draw, despite the competition rules stating that draws would remain regionally based until the fourth round, and some teams found themselves facing long trips which had not been budgeted for. This forced a re-draw and an apology from NZ Football.

Suspicions about the validity of the draw were not assuaged when the Quarter-Final draw resulted in four matches which tallied with the boundaries of New Zealand's three football regions, as would have been the case had the draw still been done on regional lines. This produced two Auckland derbies, one all-Wellington match, and one featuring the two remaining South Island teams.

== The 2010 final ==
When the semi-final draw was made, it became apparent that a final between two non-Auckland area sides was possible. As a result, it was announced that if neither finalist was from Auckland, the final would be played in either Wellington or Dunedin. This did not eventuate, with Bay Olympic beating Caversham in the first semi-final to ensure that the final would be at North Harbour Stadium.

In the final, Rangers took an early lead through a Tim Schaeffers goal in the 12th minute, the goal coming after Olympic goalkeeper Danny Robinson parried a shot from Danny Cheriton which fell kindly for the Miramar defender. Campbell Parkin doubled the lead with a close-range effort from a corner in the twentieth minute. It was Parkin's second final, as he had played in the losing Dunedin Technical side in the 2008 final. Nathan Strom reduced the deficit with a 34th-minute header, and Bay olympic continued to push for the rest of the half and the first few minutes of the second spell. With fifteen minutes remaining, it was Miramar who gained their third however, with a run by Michael White through the Bay defence. Olympic had a chance to reduce the deficit shortly afterwards when an ill-timed challenge on Joe Edwards by Schaeffers gave them a penalty. Goalkeeper Phil Imray kept out Strom's spot kick, and the score remained 3–1.

The Jack Batty Memorial Cup is awarded to the player adjudged to have made to most positive impact in the Chatham Cup final. The winner of the 2010 Jack Batty Memorial Cup was Phil Imray of Miramar Rangers.

== Results ==
=== Second round ===
7 June 2010

Central United	1–2	Metro F.C.

7 June 2010

Tauranga City United	4–2	Manurewa

7 June 2010

East Coast Bays	1–0	Onehunga Sports

7 June 2010

Melville United	2–0	Papatoetoe

7 June 2010

Eastern Suburbs	8–0	Whakatane Town

7 June 2010

Hamilton Wanderers	7–4	Mount Albert-Ponsonby

7 June 2010

Three Kings United	8–1	Claudelands Rovers

7 June 2010

Pukekohe	0–3	Birkenhead United

7 June 2010

Takapuna	5–2	North Shore United

7 June 2010

Brew Town	1–4	Waitakere City

7 June 2010

Mangere United	0–7	Glenfield Rovers

7 June 2010

Waitemata	0–5	Albany United

7 June 2010

Auckland Grammar School	3–1	Onehunga-Mangere United

7 June 2010

Oratia United	1–10	Forrest Hill Milford

7 June 2010

Bay Olympic	6–1	Lynn-Avon United

7 June 2010

Western Springs	0–3	Ellerslie

7 June 2010

Taradale	1–2	New Plymouth Rangers

7 June 2010

Red Sox Manawatu	2–0	Maycenvale United

7 June 2010

Inglewood	1–7	Napier City Rovers

7 June 2010

Palmerston North Marist	1–0	Palmerston North End

7 June 2010

Miramar Rangers	3 – 2 (aet)	Wairarapa United

7 June 2010

Western Suburbs FC	2 – 2 (aet)*	Lower Hutt City AFC

7 June 2010

Wellington United	2–1	Wellington Olympic

7 June 2010

Upper Hutt City	3–1	Wellington Marist

7 June 2010

Ferrymead Bays	4–2	Mid-Canterbury United

7 June 2010

Nelson Suburbs	2–1	Halswell United

7 June 2010

Burnside United	1–2	Western

7 June 2010

Nomads United	0–1	Cashmere Wanderers

7 June 2010

Southend United	0–5	Roslyn-Wakari

7 June 2010

Caversham	5–1	Dunedin Technical

7 June 2010

Northern Hearts	3–2	Old Boys (Invercargill)

7 June 2010

Mosgiel	2–1	Green Island

* Won on penalties by Lower Hutt (4–2)

=== Third round ===
19 June 2010

East Coast Bays AFC	9–0	Auckland Grammar School
Edington; Suri; Bola; Bresnahan; Hitchen	report

Bay City Park, North Shore

19 June 2010

Takapuna AFC	0–5	Bay Olympic
		McKenzie (pen.); Norris; Beeston; Tanabe

Taharoto Park, North Shore

19 June 2010

Metro F.C.	1–2	Waitakere City F.C.
Mason (pen.)		Solly; Linderboom

Phyllis Street Reserve, Auckland

19 June 2010

Albany United	3–1	Hamilton Wanderers
Danks; Pitt		Gibson

Rosedale Park, North Shore

19 June 2010

Three Kings United	3–2	Eastern Suburbs AFC
Bredeveldt; Corliss; Urlovic		Kitano; Webber

Keith Hay Park, Auckland

19 June 2010

Birkenhead United	1 – 0 (a.e.t.)	Tauranga City United
Wang	report

Shepherds Park, North Shore

19 June 2010

Glenfield Rovers	2–1	Ellerslie AFC
Green, Mulrooney (pen.)		Palmer

McFetridge Park, Auckland

19 June 2010

Upper Hutt City	2–1	Palmerston North Marist
Higgins, Gasper	report	Milne

Harcourt Park, Upper Hutt

19 June 2010

New Plymouth Rangers	0–4	Wellington United
	report	Groom, Little (pen.), Pumpido, Tade

Merrilands Domain, New Plymouth
Referee: I. Trevis

19 June 2010

Miramar Rangers	3 – 2 (a.e.t.)	Lower Hutt City AFC
Cheriton, Howe (o.g.), Sutherland	report	Watson, Te Anau

David Farrington Park, Wellington

19 June 2010

Ferrymead Bays	6–0	Cashmere Wanderers
C. Murphy ×2, Piercy, Draper, Samson, N. Murphy	report

Barnett Park, Christchurch

19 June 2010

Northern Hearts	2–5	Roslyn-Wakari
Hewson, Bernard	report	Dalman ×3, Conner ×2

Aorangi Park, Timaru

19 June 2010

Caversham	8–0	Mosgiel
Jackson ×3, Fleming ×3, Deeley ×2	report

Caledonian Ground, Dunedin
Referee: J. Clamp

20 June 2010

Melville United	0–1	Forrest Hill Milford
	report	Bale

Gower Park, Hamilton
Referee: B. Chibnall

20 June 2010

Napier City Rovers	12–2	Red Sox Manawatu
Smith ×6, Wilson ×3, Thomas ×2, Pickering	report	Tuck ×2

Bluewater Stadium, Napier

20 June 2010

Nelson Suburbs	0–1	Western A.F.C.
	report	Pak

Saxton Field, Nelson

=== Fourth round ===
3 July 2010

Bay Olympic	3–1	Waitakere City FC
Tanabe; Wylie; Edwards		Linderboom

Olympic Park, Auckland
Referee: M. Vincent

3 July 2010

Forrest Hill Milford	3–1	Albany United
De Vries		Hicks

Becroft Park, Auckland

3 July 2010

Three Kings United	1–2	East Coast Bays AFC
Greenhalgh 82'	report	Suri 54'; Wasi 80'

Keith Hay Park, Auckland

3 July 2010

Upper Hutt City	0–4	Wellington United
		Watson; Tade

Harcourt Park, Upper Hutt

3 July 2010

Western A.F.C.	1 – 1 (aet)*	Ferrymead Bays
McDermott 117'	report	Draper 110'
Penalties
Weiclawski (penalty missed); Willis (penalty scored); Harris (penalty scored); Jones (penalty scored) (penalty missed)	3–4	(penalty scored) Christidis; (penalty scored) Piercey; (penalty scored) Draper; (penalty scored) Collins

Walter Park, Christchurch

3 July 2010

Caversham AFC	8–2	Roslyn-Wakari
Hancock 19'; Jackson 20'; Fleming; Ryder	report	Dalman; Rae

Tonga Park, Dunedin
Referee: D. Langley

4 July 2010

Napier City Rovers	1–2	Miramar Rangers
Pickering	report	McDermott; Sutherland

Park Island, Napier
Referee: B. Chisholm

4 July 2010

Glenfield Rovers	3–1	Birkenhead United
Gwyther		Lee

McFetridge Park, Auckland

=== Quarter-finals ===
25 July 2010

Forrest Hill Milford	0–2	Bay Olympic
		McKenzie 22' 46'

Becroft Park, Auckland
Referee: Mirko Benischke

25 July 2010

Ferrymead Bays	3 – 7 (aet)	Caversham AFC
Sherman 3' 75' (pen.); Murphy 95'	report	Deeley 30' (pen.) 91' (pen.); Fleming 88' 100'; Ryder 104' 114'

Barnett Park, Christchurch
Referee: Darren Sundborn

24 July 2010

East Coast Bays	2–1	Glenfield Rovers
Morgan-Howell 6'; Beguely 90+3'	report	Seaman 21'

Bay City Park, North Shore
Referee: Nick Waldron

25 July 2010

Miramar Rangers	3–1	Wellington United
Parkin 20'; Sutherland 37' (pen.); Johnston 78'; Sutherland (red card) 70'	report	Schaeffers 53' (o.g.); Alderdice (red card) 70'; Watson (red card)

David Farrington Park, Wellington
Attendance: 1000
Referee: Matt Conger

=== Semi-finals ===
14 August 2010

Caversham AFC	3 – 3 (aet)	Bay Olympic
Jackson 21'; Hancock 88'; Ryder 94'	report	Tanabe 5' 69'; Beeston 101'; Wylie (red card) 55'
Penalties
	1–4

Caledonian Ground, Dunedin
Referee: Jamie Cross

15 August 2010

Miramar Rangers	2–1	East Coast Bays
Imray (red card) 19'; Eager 35' (pen); Parkin 55'	report	D Peat 19' (pen.)

David Farrington Park, Wellington
Referee: Antony Riley

=== Final ===
12 September 2010

Miramar Rangers	3–1	Bay Olympic
Schaeffers 12'; Parkin 20'; White 75'	report	Strom 34'

North Harbour Stadium, Auckland
Referee: Mirko Benischke
