= 2009 Chatham Cup =

Tournament details
- Venue(s): North Harbour Stadium, North Shore
- Dates: 20 September 2009

Final positions
- Champions: Wellington Olympic (1st title)
- Runners-up: Three Kings United

Awards
- Jack Batty Memorial Cup: Raf de Gregorio

The 2009 Chatham Cup is New Zealand's 82nd knockout football competition.

The 2009 competition had a preliminary round, a qualification round, and four rounds proper before quarter-finals, semi-finals, and a final. In all, 130 teams took part in the 2009 competition.

== The 2009 final ==
In the final, Three Kings United took an early lead through a third-minute goal from Luiz del Monte. Three Kings dominated for much of the early part of the match, but higher-ranked Olympic fought back, and a header just before the half-hour mark from Mickey Malivuk levelled the scores at 1–1. In the second half Olympic had the upper hand, and eventually took the lead through a 75th-minute penalty taken by Raf de Gregorio. Three Kings attacked strongly during the last few minutes of the match but were unable to produce an equaliser.

The Jack Batty Memorial Cup is awarded to the player adjudged to have made to most positive impact in the Chatham Cup final. The winner of the 2009 Jack Batty Memorial Cup was Raf de Gregorio of Wellington Olympic.

== Results ==
=== Second round ===
Birkenhead United	2 – 4	Glenfield Rovers

Bohemian Celtic	1 – 1*	Albany United

Cashmere Wanderers	1 – 5	Christchurch United

Caversham	5 – 1	Northern

Central United	2 – 0	Warkworth

Coastal Spirit	1 – 3	Woolston Technical

Dunedin Technical	3 – 0	Roslyn-Wakari

East Coast Bays	4 – 0	Claudelands Rovers

Eastern Suburbs	2 – 1	Mount Albert-Ponsonby

Ferrymead Bays	0 – 0*	Nomads United

Hamilton Wanderers	2 – 0	Papakura City

Kerikeri	0 – 1	Takapuna

Lynn-Avon United	7 – 2	Mangere United

Manurewa	1 – 0	Ngaruawahia United

Maycenvale United	5 – 2	Feilding United

Melville United	2 – 3	Forrest Hill Milford

Metro	2 – 0	Onehunga Sports

Miramar Rangers	2 – 1	Western Suburbs FC

Napier City Rovers	0 – 1	Palmerston North End

Nelson City	0 – 6	Nelson Suburbs

O'Carrolls	3 – 4	Ellerslie

Old Boys (Invercargill)	3 – 1	Waihopai (Invercargill)

Onehunga-Mangere United	4 – 0	Te Puke United

Queenstown Rovers	0 – 1	Otago University

Red Sox Manawatu	4 – 0	Taranaki Western

Taradale	4-0	Moturoa

Three Kings United	13 – 2	Te Atatu Rangers

Waitakere City	9 – 0	Bay Olympic

Waiuku	1 – 3	Papatoetoe

Waterside Karori	2 – 0	Tawa

Wellington Olympic	2 – 0	Petone

Wellington United	1 – 0	Stop Out

* Won on penalties by Bohemian Celtic (5–4) and Ferrymead Bays (6–5)

=== Third round ===
Christchurch United	0 – 1	Woolston Technical

Ellerslie	0 – 1	Forrest Hill Milford

Ferrymead Bays	0 – 0*	Nelson Suburbs

Lynn-Avon United	4 – 3	Takapuna

Manurewa	1 – 1*	East Coast Bays

Metro	3 – 0	Bohemian Celtic

Miramar Rangers	10 – 2	Maycenvale United

Old Boys	0 – 6	Caversham

Onehunga-Mangere United	0 – 6	Central United

Otago University	1 – 3	Dunedin Technical

Papatoetoe	1 – 2	Glenfield Rovers

Three Kings United	4 – 1	Hamilton Wanderers

Waitakere City	5 – 1	Eastern Suburbs

Waterside Karori	3 – 2	Palmerston North End

Wellington Olympic	4 – 2	Red Sox Manawatu

Wellington United	6 – 0	Taradale

* Won on penalties by Nelson Suburbs (5–4) and Manurewa (7–6)

=== Fourth round ===
Caversham	3 – 0	Dunedin Technical

Glenfield Rovers	2 – 5	Forrest Hill Milford

Lynn-Avon United	1 – 2	Three Kings United

Manurewa	3 – 1	Metro

Miramar Rangers	6 – 1	Wellington United

Nelson Suburbs	2 – 0	Woolston Technical

Waitakere City	3 – 2	Central United

Wellington Olympic	2 – 1	Waterside Karori

=== Quarter-finals ===
25 July 2009

Caversham	3 – 4 (aet)	Three Kings United
Dugdale; Jenkinson	Report	Blanco van Kekum; Mathews del Monte

Caledonian Ground, Dunedin

25 July 2009

Manurewa	3 – 1	Nelson Suburbs
Roberts; Allen; Thay		Maxwell

War Memorial Park, Manurewa

25 July 2009

Miramar Rangers	3 – 1	Waitakere City
Halstead; Barron; Rowe	Report	Linderboom

David Farrington Park, Wellington
Referee: C.K. Waugh

26 July 2009

Forrest Hill Milford	3 – 4	Wellington Olympic
Munday; Fisher; Pillay	Report	Malivuk; Halikias

Becroft Park, North Shore

=== Semi-finals ===
30 August 2009

Wellington Olympic	2 – 0	Manurewa AFC
Haidakis; Malivuk

Newtown Park, Wellington
Referee: Michael Hester

30 August 2009

Three Kings United	2 – 1	Miramar Rangers
Hogg; Mathews		Rowe

Keith Hay Park, Auckland
Referee: Peter O'Leary

=== Final ===
20 September

Wellington Olympic	2 – 1	Three Kings United
Malivuk 29' de Gregorio 75' (pen.)	Report	del Monte 3'

North Harbour Stadium, North Shore
Referee: Jamie Cross
