= 2008 Chatham Cup =

Tournament details
- Venue(s): North Harbour Stadium, North Shore City
- Dates: 13 September 2008

Final positions
- Champions: East Coast Bays (1st title)
- Runners-up: Dunedin Technical

Awards
- Jack Batty Memorial Cup: Ryan Zoghby

The 2008 Chatham Cup is the New Zealand's 81st knockout football competition. The final was played on 13 September at North Harbour Stadium, North Shore.

In all, 132 teams took part in the 2008 competition. Note: there is some confusion as to the round numbers. Some publications list a preliminary round, a qualification round, and four rounds proper before quarter-finals, semi-finals, and a final; others list a preliminary round and five rounds before the quarter-finals. the latter numbering system is used in this article.

The 2008 competition's final rounds were unusual for two reasons: only one of the four semi-finalists had ever previously reached the semi-finals (Dunedin Technical - the only team to have done so - won the cup in 1999), and two South Island teams reached the semi-finals for the first time since 1995. A change of venue for the final was mooted - possibly to Christchurch - had both finalists been South Island teams.

== The 2008 final ==
In the final, 1999 Cup-winners Dunedin Technical faced finals debutants East Coast Bays in front of a crowd of some 3000 spectators at North Harbour Stadium. Technical had the better of the early stages of the match, as East Coast Bays took time to settle, but were unable to press home any advantage. By the mid-stages of the half Bays had begun to exert their dominance, particularly in the midfield area. The only goal of the match came from a long Ryan Zoghby throw-in in the 34th minute which was deflected by Technical defender Blair Scoullar into his own net.

Technical responded well to being behind, increasing the pressure on the Bays defence throughout the second half, but were unable to square the match.

The Jack Batty Memorial Cup is awarded to the player adjudged to have made to most positive impact in the Chatham Cup final. The winner of the 2008 Jack Batty Memorial Cup was Ryan Zoghby of East Coast Bays.

== Results ==
=== Third round ===
Avon United (Christchurch)	3 – 2	Cashmere Wanderers

Bay Olympic (Auckland)	0 – 1	Melville United

Birkenhead United	1 – 4	Mangere United

Burnside (Christchurch)	1 – 2	Halswell United

Cambridge	0 – 1	Forrest Hill-Milford United

Caversham	8 – 0	Old Boys (Invercargill)

Dunedin Technical	8 – 0	Northern Hearts (Timaru)

Fencibles United (Auckland)	4 – 5	Mount Albert Grammar

Ferrymead Bays	1 – 3	Nomads United (Christchurch)

Glenfield Rovers	9 – 0	Ngaruawahia United

Grants Braes	1 – 3	Roslyn-Wakari

Hibiscus Coast (North Shore)	4 – 1	North Force (Whangarei)

Inglewood	3 – 2	Palmerston North End

Lower Hutt City	4 – 1	Wellington Marist

Lynn-Avon United (Auckland)	1 – 2	Eastern Suburbs (Auckland)

Metro (Auckland)	3 – 1	Takapuna

Mount Albert-Ponsonby	1 – 5	East Coast Bays

Napier City Rovers	3 – 2	Palmerston North Marist

NZ Celtic Supporters FC (Auckland)	0(2) – 4(0)†	North Shore United

Northern (Dunedin)	0 – 0*	Otago University

Oratia United	2 – 9	Central United (Auckland)

Petone	7 – 0	Stop Out (Lower Hutt)

Taradale	1 – 4	Maycenvale United (Hastings)

Taupo	5 – 3	Tauranga City United

Tawa	2 – 4	Wellington Olympic

Te Puke United	5 – 4	Rotorua United

Three Kings United (Auckland)	0 – 1	Papatoetoe

Waitakere City	1 – 0	Hamilton Wanderers

Waiuku	2 – 1	Onehunga Sports

Waterside Karori	0 – 7	Miramar Rangers

Western Suburbs (Porirua)	3 – 0	Island Bay United

Woolston Technical	0 – 3	Nelson Suburbs

† North Shore United won 4-0, but fielded an ineligible player. Match awarded to NZ Celtic Supporters and result amended to 2-0.
* Won on penalties by Northern (5-4)

=== Fourth round ===
Eastern Suburbs	1 – 2	East Coast Bays

Halswell United	0 – 1	Nelson Suburbs

Inglewood	0 – 8	Miramar Rangers

Lower Hutt City	4 – 2	Napier City Rovers

Mangere United	0 – 2	Mount Albert Grammar

Melville United	4 – 2	Papatoetoe

Metro	2 – 0	Taupo

NZ Celtic Supporters FC	0 – 6	Hibiscus Coast

Nomads United	0 – 0*	Avon United

Northern	0 – 4	Dunedin Technical

Petone	1 – 2	Wellington Olympic

Roslyn-Wakari	1 – 2	Caversham

Te Puke United	0 – 5	Central United

Waitakere City	1 – 0	Forrest Hill-Milford United

Waiuku	1 – 5	Glenfield Rovers

Western Suburbs	5 – 2	Maycenvale United

* Won on penalties by Avon United (5-4)

=== Fifth round ===
28 June

Dunedin Technical	3 – 2	Caversham
Coburn, Burgess, Smith		Jackson, Wheeler

Caledonian Ground, Dunedin North
28 June

Glenfield Rovers	3 – 0	Melville United
Hicks ×2, Mudrik

28 June

Hibiscus Coast	1 – 2 (aet)	Waitakere City
Roland (pen.)		Hogg 2 (1 pen.)

28 June

Metro	0 – 4	East Coast Bays
		Campbell, Peat, Suri, Bresnahan

Albie Turner Field
28 June

Miramar Rangers	3 – 0	Lower Hutt City
Rowe, Farrington, Smith

28 June

Mount Albert Grammar	0 – 7	Central United
		Del Monte 4 (2 pens.), Campbell, Young, Richmond

29 June

Nelson Suburbs	3 – 2	Avon United
Nawo ×2, Ayers		Long ×2

29 June

Wellington Olympic	1 – 3	Western Suburbs
Haidakis		Ryan ×2, Brown

=== Quarter-finals ===
19 July

Dunedin Technical	2 – 1	Miramar Rangers
Coburn, Smith	report	Tromp

Caledonian Ground, Dunedin North
Referee: A. Martin
19 July

East Coast Bays	6 – 0	Waitakere City
Beguely ×2, Peat, Kenyon, Bresnahan, Suri

19 July

Glenfield Rovers	3 – 2	Central United
Sinkora, Mudrik, Hicks	report	Richmond, Young

20 July

Nelson Suburbs	2 – 1 (aet)	Western Suburbs
Nawo, Allen	report (pdf)	Ryan (pen.)

Saxton Field, Stoke, Nelson
Referee: B. Goodall

=== Semi-finals ===
17 August

Dunedin Technical	3 – 2	Glenfield Rovers
Burgess ×3		Beard, Mudrik

Caledonian Ground, Dunedin North
Referee: A. Martin
16–17 August

East Coast Bays	2 – 1	Nelson Suburbs
Bresnahan, Campbell (pen.)		Billy

Bay City Park, East Coast Bays, North Shore

=== Final ===
13 September

Dunedin Technical	0 – 1	East Coast Bays
		Scoullar (o.g.)

North Harbour Stadium, North Shore
