= 2012 Chatham Cup =

2012 Chatham Cup Final
- Event: 2012 Chatham Cup
Lower Hutt City AFC	Central United
1	6
- Date: 26 August 2012
- Venue: Newtown Park, Wellington
- Man of the Match: Emiliano Tade (Central United)
- Attendance: 2,500

The 2012 ASB Chatham Cup is New Zealand's 85th knockout football competition.

The 2012 competition has a preliminary round, a qualification round, and four rounds proper before quarter-finals, semi-finals, and a final. Competition is run in three regions (northern, central, southern) until the quarter-finals, from which stage the draw is open. In all, 124 teams entered the competition.

== The 2012 final ==
Won 6–1 by Central United over Lower Hutt City

26 August 2012
14:30

Lower Hutt City	1–6	Central United
Price 90+2'		Tade 19'; Mulligan 23'; Koprivcic 45+2', 71'; Vicelich 60'; Hicks 86'

Newtown Park, Wellington
Attendance: 2,500

GK	1	(New Zealand) Steve Bayard
RB	2	(New Zealand) Caleb Duncan (yellow card) 38'
CB	77	(New Zealand) Andrew Coad
CB	7	(New Zealand) Taban Makoii (substituted off) 46'
LB	19	(New Zealand) Taylor Hall-Jones
CM	8	(New Zealand) Hamish Price
AM	9	(Germany) Tobias Bertsch
RW	12	(New Zealand) Jarrod Smith (substituted off) 72'
CM	6	(New Zealand) Kade Schrijvers (substituted off) 48'
LW	15	(New Zealand) Martin Pereyra
CF	10	(New Zealand) Hamish Watson (c)
Substitutes:
GK	13	(New Zealand) Shaun Melrose
DF	20	(New Zealand) Taylor Schrijvers (substituted on) 48'
MF	14	(New Zealand) Jack Imray (substituted on) 72'
MF	5	(New Zealand) Hayden Stuthridge
MF	11	(New Zealand) Cam Lidstone	(substituted on) 46'
Manager:
(New Zealand) Chris Zoricich

GK	1	(New Zealand) Jacob Spoonley
RB	3	(New Zealand) Nick Dale (substituted off) 74'
CB	5	(New Zealand) Ivan Vicelich (c)
CB	14	(New Zealand) Jacob Hall
LB	5	(Japan) Takuya Iwata
CM	8	(New Zealand) Jason Hicks
CM	12	(New Zealand) David Mulligan
RW	16	(Spain) Albert Riera (substituted off) 46'
AM	9	(New Zealand) Paul Urlovic (substituted off) 45+1'
LW	18	(New Zealand) Daniel Koprivcic
CF	20	(Argentina) Emiliano Tade
Substitutes:
GK	22	(New Zealand) Blaz Bugarin
DF	17	(New Zealand) Ouadhah Ragued
DF	4	(New Zealand) Kris Carpenter (substituted on) 74'
MF	10	(New Zealand) Stuart Hogg	(substituted on) 46'
MF	13	(New Zealand) Adam Dickinson	(substituted on) 45+1'
Manager:
(New Zealand) Brendan McIntyre

Man of the match

- Emiliano Tade (Central United)

== Results ==
=== Second round ===
4 June

Hibiscus Coast	2 – 4	Waitakere City

4 June

Bohemian Celtic	1 – 2 (aet)	Onehunga Sports

4 June

Waiuku	2 – 6	Three Kings United

4 June

Waitemata	3 – 0	Otumoetai

4 June

Papatoetoe	2 – 1	Lynn-Avon United

4 June

Norwest United	0 – 8	Birkenhead United

4 June

Mount Albert-Ponsonby	2 – 2 (aet)*	Eastern Suburbs

4 June

Bay Olympic	4 – 3	East Coast Bays

4 June

Ngongotaha	0 – 3	Takapuna

4 June

Hamilton Wanderers	8 – 0	Papakura City

4 June

North Shore United	1 – 2	Manukau City

4 June

Waikato Unicol	0 – 3	Oratia United

4 June

Whakatane Town	0 – 2	Mangere United

4 June

Ranui Swanson	0 – 3	Melville United

4 June

Westlake Boys High School	7 – 2	Manurewa

4 June

Tauranga City United	0 – 4	Central United

4 June

Taradale	0 – 3	Lower Hutt City

4 June

Wanganui City	1 – 0	Island Bay United

4 June

Inglewood	0 – 4	Maycenvale United

4 June

Wellington United	0 – 2	Miramar Rangers

4 June

Napier City Rovers	1 – 0	Waterside Karori

4 June

Wellington Olympic	2 – 4	Stop Out

4 June

New Plymouth Rangers	3 – 7	Wairarapa United

4 June

Upper Hutt City	4 – 3	Palmerston North Marist

4 June

FC Nelson	1 – 9	Nelson Suburbs

4 June

Cashmere Technical	6 – 1	Halswell United

4 June

Canterbury University	1 – 2	Coastal Spirit

4 June

Western	3 – 0	FC Twenty 11

4 June

Northern	0 – 1	Otago University

4 June

Queens Park	1 – 4	Roslyn-Wakari

4 June

Grants Braes	1 – 3	Caversham

4 June

Dunedin Technical	11 – 0	Old Boys (Invercargill)

*Won on penalties by Eastern Suburbs (6–5)

=== Third round ===
23/24 June

Hamilton Wanderers	1 – 0	Waitemata
Jones (pen.)

23/24 June

Onehunga Sports	0 – 2	Papatoetoe
		Singh, Frank

23/24 June

Manukau City	1 – 0	Mangere United
Ruka

23/24 June

Eastern Suburbs	4 – 2	Takapuna
Kitano ×2, Redwood, Mesias (pen.)		Williams, o.g.

23/24 June

Central United	3 – 0	Waitakere City
Tade ×2, Dickinson

23/24 June

Oratia United	0 – 1	Melville United
		Douglas

23/24 June

Three Kings United	2 – 0	Bay Olympic
Kumar, Jones

23/24 June

Birkenhead United	2 – 0	Westlake Boys High School
Tuiloma, Taylor

23/24 June

Lower Hutt City	3 – 0	Maycenvale United
Watson, Smith, Schrijvers

23/24 June

Upper Hutt City	2 – 4	Stop Out
Montalba, Grindlay		Yates ×2, Aden, Kouchaba

23/24 June

Wanganui City	0 – 6	Miramar Rangers
		Mason-Smith ×4, Doyle ×2

23/24 June

Napier City Rovers	1 – 0	Wairarapa United
Smith

23/24 June

Cashmere Technical	2 – 0	Nelson Suburbs
Yamamoto, Wortelboer

23/24 June

Western	1 – 0	Otago University
Allen

23/24 June

Coastal Spirit	0 – 2	Dunedin Technical
		Rickerby, Lockhart

23/24 June

Caversham	3 – 2	Roslyn-Wakari
Rodeka, Jackson, Fitzpatrick		Govan, Mepham

=== Fourth round ===
8 July

Three Kings United	2 – 3	Central United
Del Monte, Corrigan (pen.)		Tade ×2, Hicks (pen.)

Keith Hay Park, Auckland

7 July

Manukau City	1 – 1 (aet)*	Papatoetoe
McClure (pen.)		Singh

Massey Park, Auckland

8 July

Birkenhead United	4 – 1	Hamilton Wanderers
Lawson, Linderboom, Tuiloma, Hobson-McVeigh (pen.)		Kay

Shepherds Park, North Shore

8 July

Melville United	0 – 1	Eastern Suburbs
		Slefendorfas

Gower Park, Hamilton

7 July

Lower Hutt City	2 – 0	Napier City Rovers
Bertsch, Watson

Fraser Park, Lower Hutt

7 July

Miramar Rangers	4 – 0	Stop Out
Fifii ×2, Mason-Smith ×2

Wakefield Park, Wellington

8 July

Dunedin Technical	1 – 0	Western
Rickerby

Tahuna Park, Dunedin

8 July

Caversham	4 – 2	Cashmere Technical
Cook ×2, Jackson ×2		Ward (o.g.), Yamamoto

Tonga Park, Dunedin

* Won on penalties by Manukau City (4–3)

=== Quarter-finals ===
22 July

Birkenhead United	2 – 3	Lower Hutt City
Crawford, Salter		Watson, Te Anau, Makoii

Shepherds Park, North Shore

21 July

Caversham	3 – 1	Manukau City
Hancock ×2, Ridden		Ruka (pen.)

Caledonian Ground, Dunedin

21 July

Miramar Rangers	5 – 1	Dunedin Technical
o.g., Mason-Smith ×2, Fleming, Rowe		Da Costa

David Farrington Park, Wellington

22 July

Central United	2 – 0	Eastern Suburbs
Tade ×2

Kiwitea Street, Auckland

=== Semi-finals ===
5 August

Caversham	0 – 4	Lower Hutt City
		Watson, Te Anau, Mokaii, Coad

Caledonian Ground, Dunedin

5 August

Miramar Rangers	0 – 6	Central United
		Tade 3 (2 pen.), Paul Urlovic, Dickinson, Koprivcic (pen.)

David Farrington Park, Wellington

=== Final ===
25–26 August

Central United	6-1	Lower Hutt City
Tade, Mulligan, Koprivcic ×2, Vicelich, Hicks		Price

Newtown Park Wellington
Referee: Matt Conger
