= 2011 Chatham Cup =

Tournament details
- Venue(s): Memorial Park, Palmerston North
- Dates: 28 August 2011

Final positions
- Champions: Wairarapa United (1st title)
- Runners-up: Napier City Rovers

Awards
- Jack Batty Memorial Cup: Scott Robson (Wairarapa United)

The 2011 ASB Chatham Cup is New Zealand's 84th knockout football competition.

The 2011 competition had a preliminary round, a qualification round, and four rounds proper before quarter-finals, semi-finals, and a final. Competition was run in three regions (northern, central, southern) until the quarter-finals, from which stage the draw was open. In all, 120 teams entered the competition.

== The 2011 final ==
With both finalists coming from the lower North Island, it was decided by NZF to hold the final at a neutral venue in the same part of the country. As such, Palmerston North's Memorial Park played host to the final for the first time.

The final was played in front of a crowd of some 3,000 spectators. Underdogs Wairarapa won the final largely through their Pacific Island combination of Seule Soromon and Pita Rabo. They took the lead in the 24th minute after a period of pressure, when striker Soromon latched onto a cross from right winger Dale Higham, heading the ball past Hawke's Bay goalkeeper Shaun Peta. Early in the second half, Wairarapa failed to double the lead, when a penalty taken by their captain Adam Cowan hit the woodwork. Napier came back strongly, scoring an equaliser through Fergus Neil in the 67th minute. From this point, however, the game was largely under Wairarapa's control, and a late goal from Rabo secured the win.

The Jack Batty Memorial Cup for the final's most valuable player was awarded to Wairarapa's Scott Robson.

== Results ==
=== Second round ===
6 June

Forrest Hill Milford United	2 – 1	Waiuku

6 June

Warkworth	0 – 2	Hibiscus Coast

6 June

Manurewa	1 – 1*	Lynn-Avon United

6 June

Old Blues	2 – 4	Hamilton Wanderers

6 June

Glenfield Rovers	3 – 1	Albany United

6 June

North Shore United	1 – 2	Birkenhead United

6 June

Metro	2 – 4	Waitakere City

6 June

Ngaruawahia United	0 – 4	Westlake BHS

6 June

Fencibles United	1 – 2	Bay Olympic

6 June

Takapuna	4 – 1	Mangere United

6 June

Waitemata	8 – 3	Claudelands Rovers

6 June

Palmerston North End	0 – 3	Wellington United

6 June

Palmerston North Marist	3 – 0	Island Bay United

6 June

Napier City Rovers	5 – 0	Miramar Rangers

6 June

New Plymouth Rangers	0 – 4	Petone

6 June

Upper Hutt City	2 – 0	Tawa

6 June

Red Sox Manawatu	2 – 1	Taradale

6 June

Stop Out	5 – 0	Inglewood

6 June

Lower Hutt City	1 – 2	Wairarapa United

6 June

FC Twenty 11	1 – 2	Coastal Spirit

6 June

Christchurch United	2 – 1	Ferrymead Bays

6 June

Nelson Suburbs	1 – 2	Richmond Athletic

6 June

Woolston Technical	0 – 0*	Western

6 June

Roslyn-Wakari	2 – 0	Northern

6 June

Northern Hearts	1 – 2	Dunedin Technical

6 June

Otago University	5 – 1 (aet)	Grants Braes

6 June

Southend United	0 – 4	Caversham

* Won on penalties by Manurewa (5–4) and Western (4–1)

Central United, East Coast Bays, Melville United, Onehunga Sports, and Three Kings United received byes to the Third Round.

=== Third round ===
Westlake BHS	3 – 4	Waitemata
Roberts 30', Buswell 35', Groen 50'		Corner 1', Aalbers 70', Goldsmith 75' (pen.), Williams 84'

Hamilton Wanderers	1 – 2	Manurewa
Van Ewert		Roberts, Kay

East Coast Bays	1 – 2 (aet)	Onehunga Sports
Bresnahan		Day, Jabir

Glenfield Rovers	0 – 2	Three Kings United
		Margetts, Del Monte

Bay Olympic	8 – 0	Hibiscus Coast
Strom ×3, Holloway ×2, McKenzie, Coombes, Gardyne

Birkenhead United	3 – 2	Melville United
Davies, Boss, Hobson-McVeigh		Douglas, Chewins

Waitakere City	3 – 1	Takapuna
Emblen, McDonald, Musa		Morrow

Forrest Hill Milford United	1 – 9	Central United
Perkavic		Mulligan ×3, Corrales ×3, Hogg, Feneridis, Kelly

Petone	0 – 2	Palmerston North Marist
		Mosquera 1', 34'

Wellington United	5 – 2	Upper Hutt City
Alderdyce 20', Pumpido 55', Tade 70', Harris 82', Little 85'		Garcias 58', 89'

Red Sox Manawatu	0 – 6	Wairarapa United
		Cowen ×4, Higham, Soromon

Stop Out	0 – 1	Napier City Rovers
		Wilson 21'

Hutt Park, Lower Hutt
Referee: Andrew Phillips

Christchurch United	0 – 1 (aet)	Dunedin Technical
		Smith 109'

Roslyn-Wakari	5 – 1	Otago University
Cunningham ×2, Govan, Still, Pollak		Stone

Caversham	7 – 2	Western
Chang ×2, Fleming ×2, Rodeka, Jackson, ? (o.g.)		Sansom, House

Richmond Athletic	3 – 5	Coastal Spirit
Wright ×2, Olea		Turnbull2, Gerhardt, Stewart, Wellbourn (pen.)

=== Fourth round ===
2 July

Manurewa	1 – 0	Birkenhead United
O'Brien 84'

Referee: Cory Mills

Bay Olympic	5 – 0	Waitemata
McKenzie ×2, Gardyne, Butler, Al Shamsi

Onehunga Sports	4 – 1	Three Kings United
Murphy, Shaker, Day, Haviland		?

Waitakere City	1 – 0	Central United
Linderboom 83'

Wellington United	0 – 1 (aet)	Wairarapa United
		Soromon 95'

Napier City Rovers	3 – 0	Palmerston North Marist

Roslyn-Wakari	1 – 2	Dunedin Technical
Govan		Burgess ×2

Caversham	6 – 4	Coastal Spirit
Ross 35', Schwarz 47', Overton 49', 79', Fleming 85', Hancock 86'		Wellbourn 41', Nicol 62', Turnbull 67', 80'

Caledonian Ground, Dunedin
Referee: E. Cook

=== Quarter-finals ===
24 July

Onehunga Sports	0 – 4	Caversham
		Fleming 22' (pen.), Jackson 53', 65', Hancock 82'

Waikaraka Park, Onehunga
Referee: Mirko Benischke

24 July

Napier City Rovers	3 – 2 (aet)	Manurewa
Wilson 59' (pen.), 71', Single 103'		Kay 6', Bodman 54'

Park Island, Napier
Referee: Jamie Cross

24 July

Wairarapa United	4 – 1	Waitakere City
Shailer 5', 44', Cowen 72', Sabatu 81'		Linderboom 29'

Colin Pugh Sports Bowl, Masterton
Referee: Matt Conger

24 July

Dunedin Technical	3 – 3 (aet)*	Bay Olympic
Burgess 83', 103', 112'		McKenzie 57' (pen.), Cunneen 110', Collett 114'

Caledonian Ground, Dunedin
Referee: Allan Martin

* Won on penalties by Bay Olympic (5–3)

=== Semi-finals ===
14 August

Napier City Rovers	2 – 1	Caversham
Wilson 49' (pen.), Stevenson 59'		Jones 4'

Park Island, Napier
Referee: Nick Waldron

14 August

Bay Olympic	0 – 1	Wairarapa United
		Soromon 47'

Olympic Park, Auckland
Referee: Mirko Benischke

=== Final ===
28 August

Wairarapa United	2 - 1	Napier City Rovers
Soromon 24', Rabo 86'	report	Neil 67'

Memorial Park, Palmerston North
Referee: Peter O'Leary
