= 2015 Chatham Cup =

2015 ASB Chatham Cup

Tournament details
- Country: New Zealand
- Teams: 125

The 2015 Chatham Cup is New Zealand's 88th annual knockout football competition.

The 2015 competition had a preliminary round, a qualification round, and four rounds proper before quarter-finals, semi-finals, and a final. In total, 125 teams took part in the 2015 competition, two fewer than the 2014 Chatham Cup.

== Round and dates ==
Round	Match date	Number of fixtures	Teams	New entries this round
Preliminary round	25–27 April 2015	14 + 80 Byes	125 → 111	28
Round 1	27 April–10 May 2015	47 + 17 byes	111 → 64	80
Round 2	30 May–1 June 2015	32	64 → 32	17
Round 3	27–28 June 2015	16	32 → 16	none
Round 4	10–12 July 2015	8	16 → 8	none
Quarterfinals	8–9 August 2015	4	8 → 4	none
Semifinals	29–30 August 2015	2	4 → 2	none
The Grand Final	20 September 2015	1	2 → 1	none

== The 2015 final ==
The Final of the 2015 Chatham Cup was held between Eastern Suburbs and Napier City Rovers on Sunday, 20 September 2015 at The Trusts Arena, Waitakere City.

Eastern Suburbs won the match 2–1 after extra time.

It was the sixth time Eastern Suburbs AFC had won the Chatham Cup.

== Results ==
=== Round 2 ===
New Entries:

- Central United
- Eastern Suburbs
- Birkenhead United AFC
- Western Suburbs
- Napier City Rovers
- Three Kings United
- East Coast Bays AFC
- Onehunga Sports
- Melville United
- Ferrymead Bays Football
- Palmerston North Marist
- Bay Olympic
- Glenfield Rovers
- Waitakere City FC
- Hamilton Wanderers FC
- Western Springs AFC
- Stop Out

Team 1	Score	Team 2
Wairarapa United	3–0	Havelock North Wanderers AFC
Victoria University AFC	2–3	Island Bay United
New Plymouth Rangers	3–0	Tawa AFC
Wellington United	2–3	Western Suburbs
Wellington Olympic AFC	4–2	North End AFC
Lower Hutt City AFC	0–3	Petone FC
Palmerston North Marist	6–0	Red Sox Manawatu
Napier City Rovers	2–1	Stop Out
Northern Hearts AFC	4–1	Mornington AFC
Roslyn-Wakari	2–3	Dunedin Technical
West End	1–5	Mosgiel
Otago University AFC	1–0	Caversham AFC
Mangere United	7–3	Te Puke United
Waitemata City AFC	2–1	Hibiscus Coast AFC
Manukau City AFC	3–0	Claudelands Rovers
Takapuna AFC	2–6	Papakura City FC
Cashmere Technical	6–1	Halswell United
Ferrymead Bays	3–1	Richmond Athletic
Coastal Spirit	3–2	Selwyn United
Nomads United	4–2	Parklands United
Melville United	9–0	South Auckland Rangers
The University of Auckland FC	0–2	Tauranga City United AFC
Eastern Suburbs AFC	4–1	Western Springs AFC
North Shore United	1–0	Hamilton Wanderers
Albany United	0–3	Forrest Hill Milford
Ellerslie AFC	0–4	Birkenhead United
FC Old Boys	1–4	East Coast Bays AFC
Waiuku AFC	4–3	Waitakere City FC
Central United	3–0	Glenfield Rovers
Onehunga Sports	5–1	Bay Olympic
Oratia United	3–0	Mount Albert-Ponsonby
Three Kings United	5–2	Ngongotaha AFC

=== Round 3 ===
Team 1	Score	Team 2
Wairarapa United	3–0	Island Bay United
New Plymouth Rangers	0–4	Western Suburbs
Wellington Olympic	3–1	Petone FC
Palmerston North Marist	2–4	Napier City Rovers
Northern Hearts	0–10	Dunedin Technical
Mosgiel	1–0	Otago University AFC
Mangere United	2–1	Waitemata City AFC
Manukau City AFC	3–4	Papakura City FC
Cashmere Technical	2–1	Ferrymead Bays
Coastal Spirit	3–2	Nomads United
Melville United	1–2	Tauranga City United
Eastern Suburbs	4–1	North Shore United
Forrest Hill Milford	1–3	Birkenhead United
East Coast Bays AFC	2–0	Waiuku AFC
Central United	2–0	Onehunga Sports
Oratia United	2–6	Three Kings United

=== Round 4 ===
Team 1	Score	Team 2
Wairarapa United	2–7	Western Suburbs
Wellington Olympic	3–4	Napier City Rovers
Dunedin Technical	6–1	Mosgiel
Mangere United	3–1	Papakura City FC
Cashmere Technical	3–1	Coastal Spirit
Tauranga City United AFC	1–1 (p.)	Eastern Suburbs
Birkenhead United	2–0	East Coast Bays AFC
Central United	2–0	Three Kings United

=== Quarterfinals ===
Team 1	Score	Team 2
Western Suburbs	0–3	Napier City Rovers
Dunedin Technical	1–2	Mangere United
Cashmere Technical	1–2	Eastern Suburbs
Birkenhead United	3–0	Central United

=== Semi-finals ===
Team 1	Score	Team 2
Eastern Suburbs	4–0	Mangere United
Birkenhead United	1–1 (p.)	Napier City Rovers

=== Final ===
Team 1	Score	Team 2
Eastern Suburbs	2–1	Napier City Rovers
