= 2006 Chatham Cup =

Tournament details
- Venue(s): North Harbour Stadium, North Shore
- Dates: 2 September 2006

Final positions
- Champions: Western Suburbs FC (2nd title)
- Runners-up: Eastern Suburbs

Awards
- Jack Batty Memorial Cup: Phil Imray (Western Suburbs)

The 2006 Chatham Cup was the 79th annual nationwide knockout football competition in New Zealand.

Up to the last 16 of the competition, the cup was run in three regions (northern, central, and southern), with an open draw from the quarter-finals on. In all, 137 teams took part in the competition. Note: Different sources give different numberings for the rounds of the competition. Some record five rounds prior to the quarter-finals; others note a preliminary round followed by four full rounds. The former numbering system isn used in this article.

== The 2006 final ==
The Jack Batty Memorial Cup is awarded to the player adjudged to have made to most positive impact in the Chatham Cup final. The winner of the 2006 Jack Batty Memorial Cup was Western Suburbs FC player Jon Harahap.

== Results ==
=== Third Round ===
Central United (Auckland)	5 – 2	Ellerslie

Christchurch Technical	2 – 2*	Western (Christchurch)

Claudelands Rovers	1 – 0	Waiuku

East Coast Bays	4 – 0	Fencibles United (Auckland)

Eastern Suburbs (Auckland)	4 – 0	Mount Albert Grammar

Ferrymead Bays	5 – 0	Nelson United

Glenfield Rovers	1 – 0	Takapuna

Hamilton Wanderers	1 – 0	Birkenhead United

Kapiti Coast United	3 – 4	Wellington Olympic

Maycenvale United (Hastings)	0 – 1	Palmerston North Marist

Metro (Auckland)	2 – 3	Westlake BHS

Miramar Rangers	5 – 1	Tawa

Mosgiel	2 – 0	Grants Braes

Mount Albert-Ponsonby	2 – 3	Melville United

Napier City Rovers	5 – 2	Gisborne Thistle

Ngaruawahia United	2 – 1	Onehunga Sports

Nomads United (Christchurch)	2 – 0	Avon United (Christchurch)

North Shore United	8 – 0	Papatoetoe

Otahuhu United	0 – 1	Onehunga-Mangere United

Papakura	0 – 5	Mangere United

Petone	6 – 1	Wellington College

Roslyn-Wakari	4 – 1	Green Island

Stop Out (Lower Hutt)	2 – 1	Lower Hutt City

Tauranga City United	5 – 0	Matamata Swifts

Three Kings United (Auckland)	4 – 2	Albany United

University-Mount Wellington	2 – 3	Waitakere City

Upper Hutt City	1 – 2	Waterside Karori

Waihopai (Invercargill)	0 – 3	Caversham

Wanganui City	1 – 3	Wanganui East Athletic

Warkworth	0 – 5	Bay Olympic (Auckland)

Western Suburbs FC (Porirua)	5 – 1	Victoria University

Woodleigh (New Plymouth)	1 – 3	Red Sox Manawatu (Palmerston N.)

* Won on penalties by Western (5–4).

=== Fourth Round ===
Central United	4 – 1	Bay Olympic

Claudelands Rovers	0 – 5	Mangere United

East Coast Bays	4 – 1	North Shore United

Eastern Suburbs	3 – 2	Waitakere City

Glenfield Rovers	4 – 1	Melville United

Miramar Rangers	1 – 1*	Palmerston North Marist

Mosgiel	0 – 2	Caversham

Napier City Rovers	0 – 2	Stop Out

Ngaruawahia United	2 – 6	Hamilton Wanderers

Nomads United	1 – 0	Western

Red Sox Manawatu	0 – 2	Waterside Karori

Roslyn-Wakari	5 – 3	Ferrymead Bays

Tauranga City United	4 – 2	Onehunga-Mangere United

Wanganui East Athletic	1 – 10	Wellington Olympic

Western Suburbs FC	7 – 0	Petone

Westlake BHS	3 – 6	Three Kings United

* Won on penalties by Palmerston North Marist (9–7).

=== Fifth Round ===
1 July

East Coast Bays	1 – 0	Glenfield Rovers

1 July

Eastern Suburbs	1 – 0	Hamilton Wanderers

1 July

Mangere United	1 – 2	Central United

1 July

Nomads United	2 – 3	Caversham

1 July

Roslyn-Wakari	6 – 0	Palmerston North Marist

1 July

Tauranga City United	1 – 1 (aet)*	Three Kings United

1 July

Waterside Karori	1 – 2	Wellington Olympic

1 July

Western Suburbs FC	2 – 1	Stop Out

* Won on penalties by Tauranga City United (5–4).

=== Quarter-finals ===
15 July

Caversham	2 – 1	Wellington Olympic

15 July

East Coast Bays	0 – 2	Central United

15 July

Eastern Suburbs	4 – 0	Tauranga City United

Western Suburbs FC	1 – 0	Roslyn-Wakari

=== Semi-finals ===
August

Central United	3 – 3 (aet)*	Eastern Suburbs

August

Western Suburbs FC	4 – 0	Caversham

* Won on penalties by Eastern Suburbs (5–3).

=== Final ===
2 September

Western Suburbs FC	0 – 0 (aet)*	Eastern Suburbs

North Harbour Stadium, North Shore
Referee: P. O'Leary

* Won on penalties by Western Suburbs (3–0).
