= 2004 Chatham Cup =

Tournament details
- Venue(s): North Harbour Stadium, North Shore
- Dates: 6 September 2004

Final positions
- Champions: Miramar Rangers (3rd title)
- Runners-up: Waitakere City

Awards
- Jack Batty Memorial Cup: Tim Butterfield (Miramar Rangers)

The 2004 Chatham Cup was the 77th annual nationwide knockout football competition in New Zealand.

Up to the last 16 of the competition, the cup was run in three regions (northern, central, and southern), with an open draw from the quarter-finals on. In all, 133 teams took part in the competition. Different publications give different numbers for the rounds in the competition, with some showing two preliminary rounds followed by four rounds proper prior to quarter-finals, semi-finals and a final, and others showing one preliminary round followed by five rounds proper. The latter designations are used for the results below.

Extra time played during the 2004 Chatham Cup used the golden goal rule.

One surprise of the 2004 competition was the performance of Sunday league social team Internationale, who reached the last 32 of the competition

== The 2004 final ==
The final was the only Chatham Cup final to be decided by golden goal, with a Michele Zannoto goal in the 16th minute of extra time breaking the deadlock in favour of Miramar Rangers.

The Jack Batty Memorial Cup is awarded to the player adjudged to have made to most positive impact in the Chatham Cup final. The winner of the 2004 Jack Batty Memorial Cup was Tim Butterfield of Miramar Rangers.

== Results ==
=== Third round ===
Caversham	6 – 1	Green Island

Central United Brown (Auckland)	1 – 2	Whangarei

Central United (Auckland)	5 – 0	Tauranga City United

Christchurch Rangers	1 – 1*	Christchurch Technical

Christchurch United	1 – 3	Western (Christchurch)

Claudelands Rovers	1 – 1*	Internationale (Auckland)

East Coast Bays	9 – 0	Hamilton North

Eastern Suburbs (Auckland)	2 – 0	Onehunga Sports

Ellerslie	0 – 1	Mangere United

Fencibles United (Auckland)	4 – 0	Bohemian Celtic (Auckland)

Gisborne Thistle	0 – 2	Napier City Rovers

Glenfield Rovers	0 – 3	North Shore United

Halswell United	4 – 1	Nelson United

Hamilton Wanderers	2 – 1	Melville United (Hamilton)

Island Bay United	0 – 3	Tawa

Kerikeri	2 – 1	Dispensary Bar (Auckland)

Lynn-Avon United (Auckland)	5 – 1	Cambridge

Manawatu (Palmerston North)	3 – 2	Red Sox (Palmerston North)

Manukau City	2 – 0	West Hamilton United

Metro (Auckland)	1 – 0	Papakura

Ngaruawahia United	3 – 6	Takapuna

Otago University	1 – 3	Mosgiel

Palmerston North Marist	4 – 0	Wanganui City

Roslyn-Wakari	2 – 3	Nelson Suburbs

University-Mount Wellington	2 – 1	Oratia United

Upper Hutt City	0 – 0*	Brooklyn Northern United

Victoria University	0 – 5	Miramar Rangers

Waitakere City	4 – 0	Bay Olympic (Auckland)

Waterside Karori	2 – 0	Kapiti Coast United (Raumati Beach)

Wellington Olympic	9 – 0	Wainuiomata

Wellington United	3 – 2	Naenae

Western Suburbs (Porirua)	2 – 4	Lower Hutt City

* Won on penalties by Christchurch Rangers (5–4), Internationale (7–6), and Upper Hutt City (4–2)

=== Fourth round ===
Central United	4 – 2	Fencibles United

Eastern Suburbs	10 – 0	Manukau City

Halswell United	3 – 4	Western

Hamilton Wanderers	3 – 4	Takapuna

Internationale	1 – 3	East Coast Bays

Kerikeri	3 – 1	Whangarei

Lower Hutt City	2 – 1	Wellington United

Lynn-Avon United	3 – 2	North Shore United

Manawatu	0 – 6	Wellington Olympic

Mangere United	4 – 1	Metro

Mosgiel	2 – 3	Caversham

Napier City Rovers	1 – 3	Miramar Rangers

Nelson Suburbs	4 – 1	Christchurch Rangers

University-Mount Wellington	1 – 1*	Waitakere City

Upper Hutt City	2 – 1	Tawa

Waterside Karori	2 – 3	Palmerston North Marist

* Won on penalties by Waitakere City (6–5)

=== Fifth round ===
3 July

Kerikeri	0 – 10	Eastern Suburbs
		Edwards 2, Perry 2, Webber 2, Van Steeden 2, Pearce (pen.), Easthope

3 July

Lower Hutt City	5 – 0	Upper Hutt City
Garcias 3, Adams, Malivuk

4 July

Lynn-Avon United	1 – 2 (aet)	East Coast Bays
Hodgson		Broderson, Crump

3 July

Mangere United	1 – 2 (aet)	Waitakere City
Major (pen.)		Williams, Bright

3 July

Miramar Rangers	3 – 2 (aet)	Wellington Olympic
B. Little 2, Ryan		Lupi, Brown

4 July

Nelson Suburbs	2 – 3 (aet)	Palmerston North Marist
Brockie, White		Halstead, Cowan, Sands

4 July

Takapuna	0 – 7	Central United
		Callinan 3 (1 pen.), McCormack 2, Sykes, Coombes

4 July

Western	2 – 0	Caversham
Hughes, Clapham

=== Quarter-finals ===
24 July

East Coast Bays	2 – 3 (aet)	Waitakere City
Hyde, Sturm		Slack, Gray (pen.), o.g.

24 July

Lower Hutt City	2 – 3 (aet)	Eastern Suburbs
Adams, Garcias		Bola, Webber, Van Steeden

25 July

Palmerston North Marist	1 – 0	Central United
Sands

25 July

Western	1 – 2	Miramar Rangers
Turnbull		Butterfield (pen.), G. Little

=== Semi-finals ===
14 August

Eastern Suburbs	0 – 1	Miramar Rangers
		B. Little

15 August

Waitakere City	2 – 1	Palmerston North Marist
Fowler, Bright		Halstead

=== Final ===
6 September

Miramar Rangers	1 – 0 (aet)	Waitakere City
Zannoto

North Harbour Stadium, North Shore
Referee: P. O'Leary
