= 2007 Chatham Cup =

Tournament details
- Venue(s): Kiwitea Street, Auckland
- Dates: 2 September 2007

Final positions
- Champions: Central United (4th title)
- Runners-up: Western Suburbs FC

Awards
- Jack Batty Memorial Cup: Luiz del Monte

The 2007 Chatham Cup was the 80th annual nationwide knockout football competition in New Zealand.

Up to the last 16 of the competition, the cup was run in three regions (northern, central, and southern), with an open draw from the quarter-finals on. In all, 123 teams took part in the competition. Note: Different sources give different numberings for the rounds of the competition. Some record five rounds prior to the quarter-finals; others note a preliminary round followed by four full rounds. The former numbering system is used in this article.

== The 2007 final ==
The Jack Batty Memorial Cup, presented to the player adjudged to have made to most positive impact in the Chatham Cup final, was awarded to Luiz del Monte of Central United.

== Results ==
=== Third Round ===
Cambridge	0 – 4	Manurewa

Caversham	2 – 0	Queenstown Rovers

Halswell United	0 – 1	Western (Christchurch)

Hamilton Wanderers	6 – 1	Kaikohe

Lynn-Avon United (Auckland)	0 – 2	Melville United

Mangere United	2 – 0	Tauranga City United

Matamata Swifts	0 – 0*	Glenfield Rovers

Maycenvale United (Hastings)	1 – 2	Gisborne City

Metro (Auckland)	2 – 2*	Waitakere City

Mount Albert Grammar	2 – 1	Birkenhead United

Mount Albert-Ponsonby	0 – 6	Eastern Suburbs (Auckland)

Nelson Suburbs	0 – 0*	Avon United (Christchurch)

Ngaruawahia United	1 – 5	Albany United

Nomads United (Christchurch)	2 – 1	Ferrymead Bays

Northern (Dunedin)	5 – 0	Mornington

Northern Hearts (Timaru)	1 – 2	Dunedin Technical

North Shore United	3 – 1	Te Atatu

Old Boys (Invercargill)	1 – 3	Roslyn-Wakari

Onehunga-Mangere United	0 – 1	East Coast Bays

Onehunga Sports	1 – 7	Central United (Auckland)

Oratia United	2 – 3	Papakura City

Palmerston North End	2 – 0	New Plymouth Rangers

Papatoetoe	2 – 1	Bay Olympic (Auckland)

Petone	0 – 3	Miramar Rangers

Takapuna	3 – 1	Taupo

Taradale	1 – 9	Napier City Rovers

Tauranga Boys College	1 – 3	Three Kings United (Auckland)

Wairarapa United (Masterton)	2 – 0	Wellington United

Wellington Marist	2 – 0	Lower Hutt City

Wellington Olympic	6 – 0	Victoria University

Western Suburbs FC (Porirua)	3 – 1	Tawa

Woolston Technical	2 – 1	Christchurch Rangers

* Won on penalties by Glenfield Rovers (4–2), Metro (3–1), and Nelson Suburbs (5–4).

=== Fourth Round ===
Caversham	4 – 1	Northern

Central United	5 – 0	Mount Albert Grammar

Hamilton Wanderers	3 – 2	Three Kings United

Manurewa	2 – 1	Mangere United

Melville United	2 – 3	Eastern Suburbs

Metro	2 – 1	Takapuna

Miramar Rangers	3 – 1	Wellington Olympic

Napier City Rovers	1 – 0	Gisborne City

Nomads United	0 – 0*	Nelson Suburbs

North Shore United	1 – 0	Albany United

Palmerston North End	0 – 1	Wairarapa United

Papakura City	2 – 2*	Glenfield Rovers

Papatoetoe	1 – 7	East Coast Bays

Roslyn-Wakari	3 – 2	Dunedin Technical

Wellington Marist	0 – 3	Western Suburbs FC

Woolston Technical	3 – 4	Western

* Won on penalties by Nomads United (3–0) and Papakura City (6–5).

=== Fifth Round ===
East Coast Bays	3 – 3 (aet)*	Central United

Eastern Suburbs	6 – 2	Metro

Miramar Rangers	5 – 0	Napier City Rovers

Nomads United	3 – 0	Western

North Shore United	2 – 1	Manurewa

Papakura City	0 – 1	Hamilton Wanderers

Roslyn-Wakari	2 – 5	Caversham

Wairarapa United	1 – 2 (aet)	Western Suburbs FC

* Won on penalties by Central United (4–3).

=== Quarter-finals ===
15 July

Caversham	1 – 0 (aet)	Nomads United

July

Central United	2 – 1 (aet)	Eastern Suburbs

July

North Shore United	3 – 1	Hamilton Wanderers

July

Western Suburbs FC	1 – 0 (aet)	Miramar Rangers

=== Semi-finals ===
11 August

Caversham	1 – 3	Western Suburbs FC

5 August

Central United	3 – 1 (aet)	North Shore United

=== Final ===
2 September

Central United	0 – 0 (aet)*	Western Suburbs FC
Wrathall

Kiwitea Street, Auckland
Referee: Kevin Stoltenkamp

* Won on penalties by Central United (10–9).
