= 1999 Chatham Cup =

Tournament details
- Venue(s): North Harbour Stadium, North Shore
- Dates: 18 September 1999

Final positions
- Champions: Dunedin Technical (1st title)
- Runners-up: Waitakere City

Awards
- Jack Batty Memorial Cup: Aaron Burgess (Dunedin Technical)

The 1999 Chatham Cup was the 72nd annual nationwide knockout football competition in New Zealand.

Up to the last 16 of the competition, the cup was run in three regions (northern, central, and southern), with an open draw from the quarterfinals on. In all, 132 teams took part in the competition. Note: Different sources give different numberings for the rounds of the competition. Some record five rounds prior to the quarterfinals; others note a preliminary round followed by four rounds proper.

== The 1999 final ==
Dunedin Technical made up for their big loss in the 1998 final, winning 4–0.

The Jack Batty Memorial Cup is awarded to the player adjudged to have made to most positive impact in the Chatham Cup final. The winner of the 1999 Jack Batty Memorial Cup was Aaron Burgess of Dunedin Technical.

== Results ==
=== Third round ===
Auckland Grammar	3 – 2	Manurewa

Brooklyn Northern United	1 – 2	North Wellington

Cambridge	2 – 3	Mount Albert-Ponsonby

Caversham	7 – 1	Otago University

Central United (Auckland)	9 – 0	King's Arms Cosmos (Auckland)

Dunedin Technical	7 – 0	Waihopai (Invercargill)

East Coast Bays	0 – 1	Tauranga City

Eastern Suburbs (Auckland)	1 – 1 (aet)*	Otahuhu United

Gisborne Thistle	0 – 8	Napier City Rovers

Halswell United	3 – 0	Christchurch Rangers

Island Bay United	2 – 1	Waterside Karori

Lower Hutt City	1 – 3	Western Suburbs FC (Porirua)

Manukau City	w/o	Whangarei

Melville United (Hamilton)	6 – 2	Dispensary Bar (Auckland)

Miramar Rangers	5 – 1	Red Sox Riverside (Palmerston N.)

Moturoa	2 – 4	Paraparaumu United

North Shore United	5 – 2	Papakura City

Onehunga-Mangere United	0 – 2	Mount Albert Grammar

Onehunga Sports	2 – 4	Mount Wellington

Otorohanga	1 – 0	Hibiscus Coast

Raumati Hearts	4 – 2	Wellington College

Seatoun	2 – 1	Wainuiomata

South Auckland Rangers	0 – 1	Bay Olympic (Auckland)

Takapuna City	4 – 2	Glenfield Rovers

Taupo	3 – 1	Birkenhead United

Tikipunga (Whangarei)	0 – 3	Ngaruawahia United

University (Auckland)	4 – 2	Ellerslie

Upper Hutt City	7 – 0	Naenae

Waitakere City	1 – 0	Metro (Auckland)

Wellington Olympic	4 – 1	Petone

Western City (Hamilton)	0 – 7	Hamilton Wanderers

Woolston WMC	1 – 0	Christchurch United

* Won on penalties by Eastern Suburbs (4–3)

=== Fourth round ===
Auckland Grammar	4 – 3	University

Bay Olympic	1 – 0	Mount Albert Grammar

Caversham	1 – 4	Dunedin Technical

Eastern Suburbs	2 – 3	Hamilton Wanderers

Island Bay United	1 – 3	Western Suburbs FC

Melville United	10 – 0	Otorohanga

Mount Wellington	3 – 0	Manukau City

Napier City Rovers	3 – 0	North Wellington

Paraparaumu United	3 – 2	Seatoun

Raumati Hearts	0 – 4	Wellington Olympic

Takapuna City	6 – 2	Mount Albert-Ponsonby

Taupo	0 – 4	Central United

Tauranga City	1 – 0	North Shore United

Upper Hutt City	0 – 3	Miramar Rangers

Waitakere City	6 – 1	Ngaruawahia United

Woolston WMC	1 – 1 (aet)*	Halswell United

* Won on penalties by Halswell United (8–7)

=== Fifth round ===
Bay Olympic	5 – 0	Auckland Grammar

Dunedin Technical	4 – 1	Halswell United

Miramar Rangers	2 – 0	Western Suburbs FC

Napier City Rovers	3 – 0	Hamilton Wanderers

Paraparaumu United	2 – 4	Wellington Olympic

Takapuna City	2 – 0	Melville United

Tauranga City	1 – 1 (aet)*	Mount Wellington

Waitakere City	2 – 1	Central United

* Won on penalties by Tauranga City (4–1)

=== Quarter-finals ===
July

Bay Olympic	0 – 4	Takapuna City

July

Dunedin Technical	4 – 3	Miramar Rangers

July

Napier City Rovers	3 – 2 (aet)	Wellington Olympic

July

Waitakere City	4 – 3	Tauranga City

=== Semi-finals ===
15 August

Dunedin Technical	2 – 1	Napier City Rovers
Hughes, Seales		McIvor

15 August

Waitakere City	4 – 0	Takapuna City
Viljoen 2, Stephens, Campbell

=== Final ===
18 September

Dunedin Technical	4 – 0	Waitakere City
Marshall, Tee, Flaws, Burgess

North Harbour Stadium, North Shore
Referee: I. Walker
