= 1970 Chatham Cup =

Tournament details
- Venue(s): Basin Reserve, Wellington (replay Newmarket Park, Auckland)
- Dates: 5 September 1970 (replay 12 September)

Final positions
- Champions: Blockhouse Bay (1st title)
- Runners-up: Western Suburbs FC

The 1970 Chatham Cup was the 43rd annual nationwide knockout football competition in New Zealand.

Early stages of the competition were run on a regional basis, however the structure of the competition was altered from previous years, largely due to the commencement of the New Zealand National Soccer League. Whereas in previous years qualification matches had been entirely run on a by-region basis culminating in two finals, one in each island, the draw from 1970 became more open, with regional qualifiers facing National League opposition in the final rounds. This led to several firsts for the competition, with Nelson United becoming the first South Island team to play a (pre-final) Chatham Cup match in the North Island, Western Suburbs FC becoming the first North Island team to play in Christchurch, and Stop Out being the first North Island team to play in Dunedin. Caversham was the only regional qualifier to make it as far as the semi-finals in the National League's first year, beating two league teams (Christchurch United and Stop Out) in the process.

A further boost was given to the competition though Gillette, who became the Chatham Cup's first naming-rights sponsors. The competition was to be known as the Gillette Chatham Cup until 1974, when Lion Breweries took over sponsorship of the competition.

In all, 105 teams took part in the competition, with the eight National League teams being joined with a further 67 North Island and 30 South Island teams. In the National League's inaugural season, Blockhouse Bay became the first team to win the league and cup double. Note: Different sources give different numberings for the rounds of the competition: some start round one with the beginning of the regional qualifications; others start numbering from the first national knock-out stage. The former numbering scheme is used in this article.

== The 1970 final ==
The final was the first all-North Island final, and was also the first final to require a replay. The replay was held in Auckland, making this first Chatham Cup final to be decided outside Wellington, and the first not to be decided at the Basin Reserve since 1927. The first match was memorable, and pitted favourites against underdogs. The two teams had both been in the first season of the national league, with Blockhouse Bay emerging as clear champions and Western Suburbs propping up the foot of the table with just one win from 14 league matches. It was the underdogs who had the makings of the trophy, however, leading by two Wayne Huntley goals with only a handful of minutes remaining. Between the 83rd and 86th minutes, however, Colin Shaw hit the target twice for the Bay, the second of the goals coming from a penalty which had to be retaken. Bay dominated the two periods of extra time, yet it was Suburbs who came closest to gaining the upper hand, hitting the woodwork on two occasions. The old rule of counting corners to decide the outcome of a tie had been scrapped and the idea of a penalty shootout had not yet been introduced, so the match headed to a replay.

The rematch was a seesaw affair, with Bay leading twice only for Suburbs to equalise each time. With minutes remaining, Suburbs found what looked like the winning strike, but it was ruled out for offside. With seconds to go, it was Blockhouse Bay who finally tipped the scales. Goals in the match came from Clive Campbell, Ian Ormond and Colin Shaw for the Bay and Bruce Baker and Barry Humphreys for Suburbs.

== Results ==
=== Third Round ===
Birkenhead United	3 – 1	Henderson

Caversham	4 – 0	Roslyn-Wakari

Dunedin City	1 – 0	Northern (Dunedin)

East Coast Bays	1 – 0	Metro College (Auckland)

Eden (Auckland)	3 – 1	Takapuna City

Hamilton	2 – 1	Huntly Thistle

Leopard United (Hastings)	4 – 0	Taradale

Invercargill Thistle	9 – 1	Waihopai (Invercargill)

Invercargill United	1 – 1*	Queens Park (Invercargill)

Johnson Villa (Wellington)	2 – 0	Wellington Northern

Kiwi United (Palmerston North)	4 – 2	Levin United

Miramar Rangers	6 – 0	Naenae

Napier Rovers	3 – 2	Havelock North Wanderers

Nelson United	2 – 0	Richmond Athletic

New Brighton	2 – 2	Shamrock (Christchurch)

New Brighton	4 – 1 (replay)	Shamrock (Christchurch)

New Plymouth Old Boys	3 – 0	Stratford

North Shore United	2 – 1	Point Chevalier

Palmerston City (Palmerston North)	9 – 1	Massey University

Papatoetoe	5 – 2	Massey Rovers

Tokoroa	3 – 1	Claudelands Rovers

Wanganui East Athletic	2 – 0	Wanganui City

Western (Christchurch)	3 – 2	Christchurch Technical

* Won by Invercargill United on corners

=== Fourth Round ===
Birkenhead United	2 – 1	North Shore United

Caversham	7 – 1	Dunedin City

Eden	5 – 1	East Coast Bays

Gisborne Thistle	5 – 0	Wairoa

Hamilton	1 – 0	Tokoroa

Invercargill Thistle	3 – 1	Invercargill United

Miramar Rangers	2 – 0	Johnson Villa

Napier Rovers	10 – 0	Leopard United

Nelson United	6 – 1	Grosvenor Rovers (Marlborough)

New Brighton	1 – 0	Western

Palmerston City	4 – 0	Kiwi United

Papatoetoe	4 – 1	Manurewa

Rotorua City	4 – 1	Whakatane Town

Timaru City	4 – 0	Northern Hearts (Timaru)

Wanganui East Athletic	6 – 2	New Plymouth HSOB

Whangarei	8 – 1	Cruising Club (Northland)

=== Fifth Round ===
Eden	4 – 1	Birkenhead United

Hamilton	1 – 0	Rotorua City

Invercargill Thistle	2 – 3	Caversham

Miramar Rangers	1 – 2	Palmerston City

Napier Rovers	2 – 1	Gisborne Thistle

New Brighton	4 – 0	Timaru City

Papatoetoe	1 – 2	Whangarei

Wanganui East Athletic	0 – 2	Nelson United

=== Sixth Round ===
Blockhouse Bay	6 – 1	Whangarei

Caversham	3 – 2	Christchurch United

Gisborne City	1 – 4	Eastern Suburbs (Auckland)

Hungaria (Wellington)	3 – 1	Palmerston City

Mount Wellington	4 – 2	Eden

Napier Rovers	0 – 10	Hamilton

New Brighton	1 – 2	Western Suburbs FC (Porirua)

Stop Out (Lower Hutt)	3 – 2	Nelson United

=== Quarter-finals ===
Caversham	5 – 3	Stop Out

Eastern Suburbs	2 – 2 (aet)*	Blockhouse Bay

Hamilton	2 – 1	Hungaria

Western Suburbs FC	3 – 1	Mount Wellington

* Blockhouse Bay won on corners

=== Semi-finals ===
Hamilton	1 – 2	Blockhouse Bay

Western Suburbs FC	2 – 0	Caversham

=== Final ===
5 September 1970

Blockhouse Bay	2 – 2 (aet)	Western Suburbs FC
Shaw 2 (1 pen.)		Huntley ×2

Basin Reserve, Wellington
Referee: J. Houston

==== Replay ====
12 September 1970

Blockhouse Bay	3 – 2	Western Suburbs FC
Campbell, Ormond, Shaw		Baker, Humphreys

Newmarket Park, Auckland
Referee: J. Houston
