= East Coast Bays AFC =

East Coast Bays A.F.C.
- Full name: East Coast Bays Association Football Club
- Nickname: The Mighty Bays
- Founded: 1959
- Ground: Bay City Park
- Capacity: 4,000
- Chairman: Roger Bridge
- Head coach: Joseph Hall
- League: Northern League
- 2026: Northern League, 6th of 12
- Website: http://www.ecbafc.nz
Home colours	Away colours

East Coast Bays is an association football club located on Auckland's North Shore. The club competes in the Northern League, the second tier of New Zealand football. The club has won the Chatham Cup and the NRFL Premier Division three times.

== History ==
East Coast Bays were founded following a public meeting held at the Progressive Hall (since demolished and replaced by the Bays Club) in October 1958. The committee formed from this meeting entered four junior teams for the start of the 1959 season. As some committee members were supporters of the Scottish Rangers F.C., the colours of Royal Blue shirts, white shorts, and royal Blue sox were adopted.

East Coast Bays picked The Maxwell Farm as its ground with the pitch running north to south. The old Progress Hall on the site was adapted to serve as clubrooms.

A senior side was entered the next season and with the opening of the Auckland Harbour Bridge, the area boomed and the club grew in size to more than 1000 juniors in the late seventies and early eighties. Senior sides also grew in numbers and the first team slowly made its way through the leagues, and in 1965 when the Northern League was formed they were invited to compete in the first division.

Under coach Alan Yates, the club won promotion to the National League in 1981 but was relegated the following year.

Player numbers continued to grow and Mairangi Bay simply couldn't cope with the numbers even with an additional ground at Windsor Park. This cause a breakaway of a faction of club members to form the Rangitoto club which also saw a decline in the number of junior teams.

Successive administrations lobbied the East Coast Bays Council for more grounds and at the same time new ground criteria for clubs playing in the Northern League Premier Division meant Mairangi Park was no longer suitable for playing top football. This meant that the club spent a couple of seasons using the new ground that was developed behind Rangitoto College.

Land off Anderson's Road originally designated but no longer required for a school was acquired by the council and it was agreed that the club would move there once facilities were built and grounds developed. In 1991 the club moved to its new headquarters at the newly named Bays City Park.

Since then clubroom facilities have been developed, further grounds have been obtained at Ashley Reserve.

== Sponsorship ==
East Coast Bays announced Team Mitchell and Harcourts Cooper & Co as their main kit sponsor for the 2024 season. In February 2025, Bays announced Dynasty Sport would be the new apparel provider of the club.

=== Kit suppliers and shirt sponsors ===
Period	Kit supplier	Shirt sponsor
–2023	Lotto	None
2024	Lotto	Team Mitchell
2025–	Dynasty Sport	Team Mitchell

== Players ==
=== First-team squad ===
As of 3 November 2026

Note: Flags indicate national team as defined under FIFA eligibility rules; some limited exceptions apply. Players may hold more than one non-FIFA nationality.

No.	Pos.	Nation	Player
2	DF	NZL	Nathan Maisey
3	DF	NZL	James Edgeler
4	MF	NZL	Ryusei Ishibashi
5	DF	NZL	Jackson Jarvie
8	MF	NZL	Peter Harrison
9	FW	NZL	Ihaia Delaney
10	FW	NZL	Nicolai Berry
11	MF	NZL	Orlando Thorpe
12	MF	BDI	Moses Akimana
13	MF	NZL	Nick Gaze
14	DF	NZL	Billy Jones
15	MF	NZL	Nathan Pepper

No.	Pos.	Nation	Player
17	FW	KOR	Yun Sung Chang
19	FW	NZL	Liam Andersen
20	DF	NZL	Cameron Brown
22	DF	NZL	Jack Young
23	FW	NZL	Gogo Gjorgjevikj
24	FW	NZL	Nick Petherick
25	GK	NZL	Mitchell Bond
26	DF	NZL	Max Drake
31	GK	NZL	Hunter Cadman
32	GK	NZL	Joshua Precious
45	FW	CAN	Guy-Frank Essome Penda

== Management ==
=== Coaching staff ===
Position	Staff
Head coach	(New Zealand) Joe Hall
Assistant coach	(New Zealand) Callum Simmonds
Manager	(New Zealand) Adam Frisby

== Season to season ==
1965–1969 (Regional leagues)

Season	League	Tier	League									Chatham Cup	Top scorer	
Season	League	Tier	P	W	D	L	F	A	GD	Pts	Pos	Chatham Cup	Name	Goals
1965	Premier	1	13	0	3	10	22	61	-39	3	8th	R3		
1966	Division 1	2	18	10	2	6	57	43	+14	22	4th	R3		
1967	Division 1	2	18	4	3	11	23	50	-27	11	8th	R2		
1968	Division 1	2	18	1	1	16	27	78	-51	3	10th	R1		
1969	Division 2 A	3	19	13	3	3	47	31	+16	29	2nd	R3		
1970	Division 1	3	18	8	4	6	46	39	+7	20	3rd	R4		
1971	Division 1	2	18	5	3	10	28	44	-16	13	7th	R3		
1972	Division 1	2	18	1	3	14	13	51	-38	5	10th	R3		
1973	Division 2	3	18	5	4	9	31	42	-11	14	7th	R2		
1974	Division 2	3	18	5	7	6	19	34	-15	17	4th	R3		
1975	Division 2	3	18	4	8	6	14	30	-16	16	8th	R3		
1976	Division 2	3	18	8	3	7	34	36	-2	19	5th	R4		
1977	Division 2	3	18	8	8	2	35	16	+19	24	4th	R3		
1978	Division 2	3	18	14	2	2	48	17	+31	30	1st	R3		
1979	Division 1	2	18	4	6	8	19	30	-11	14	7th	R5		
1980	Division 1	2	22	11	5	4	36	23	+13	27	2nd	R3		
1981	Division 1	2	22	16	2	4	37	24	+23	34	1st	R4		
1982	National League	1	22	4	4	14	23	44	-21	12	11th	R4		
1983 (Note: 1983 Grading)	Division 1 A	2	13	6	6	1	22	5	+17	18	2nd	R4		
1983 (Note: 1983 One A)	Division 1 A	2	10	3	4	3	12	12	0	10	3rd	R4		
1984	Premier	2	18	7	5	6	24	29	-5	26	5th	QF		
1985	Premier	2	22	10	7	5	37	26	+11	37	5th	R4		
1986	Premier	2	22	4	5	13	21	49	-28	17	11th	R4		
1987	Premier	2	26	7	4	15	24	45	-21	25	10th	R2		
1988	Premier	2	26	6	3	17	29	55	-26	21	13th	R2		
1989	Division 1	3	22	15	3	4	52	20	+32	48	1st	R4		
1990	Premier	2	26	11	7	8	44	47	-3	40	7th	R5		
1991	Premier	2	22	10	3	9	38	38	0	33	5th	R2		
1992	Premier	2	22	8	6	8	35	30	+5	30	6th	R2		
1993	Premier	2	22	9	4	9	43	37	+6	31	7th	R3		
1994	Premier	2	22	15	1	6	56	27	+29	46	2nd	R2		
1995	Premier	2	22	11	4	7	49	29	+20	37	4th	R3		
1996	Superclub League	1	22	8	4	10	31	44	-13	28	8th	R1		
1997	Premier	2	22	6	2	14	32	55	-23	20	10th	R5		
1998	Premier	2	22	10	4	8	57	55	+2	34	5th	R3		
1999	Premier	2	18	7	6	5	36	27	+9	27	5th	R3		
2000	Premier	2	22	9	5	8	40	29	+11	32	7th	R3		
2001	Premier	2	22	4	4	14	27	52	-25	16	11th	R2		
2002	Division 1 A	3	22	13	4	5	47	26	+21	43	3rd	R5		
2003	Division 1 A	3	22	19	2	1	93	13	+80	59	1st	R2		
2004	NRFL Premier League	2	26	8	6	12	34	42	-8	30	9th	QF		
2005	NRFL Premier League	2	22	12	1	9	41	33	+8	37	4th	QF		
2006	NRFL Premier League	2	22	12	3	7	43	26	+17	39	4th	QF		
2007	NRFL Premier League	2	22	14	1	7	36	27	+9	43	2nd	R5		
2008	US1 Championship	2	?	?	?	?	?	?	?	?	1st	1st		
2009	US1 Championship	2	?	?	?	?	?	?	?	?	1st	R4		
2010	NRFL Premier League	2	24	17	5	2	75	19	+56	56	1st	SF		
2011	NRFL Premier League	2	18	9	4	5	35	27	+8	31	4th	R4		
2012	NRFL Premier League	2	18	12	0	6	36	26	+10	36	2nd	R3		
2013	NRFL Premier League	2	18	12	3	3	44	19	+25	39	1st	R4		
2014	NRFL Premier League	2	18	8	3	7	36	34	+2	27	5th	R4		
2015	NRFL Premier League	2	22	8	7	7	42	41	+1	31	7th	R5	(New Zealand) Joe Bresnahan	10
2016	NRFL Premier League	2	24	10	3	11	48	59	-11	33	8th	R5	(New Zealand) Dylan Stansfield	20
2017	NRFL Premier League	2	22	9	1	12	35	38	-4	28	7th	R4	(New Zealand) Dylan Stansfield	10
2018	NRFL Premier League	2	22	7	4	11	38	54	-16	25	10th	QF	(New Zealand) Judd Baker	9
2019	NRFL Premier League	2	22	4	2	16	60	22	-36	14	12th	R4	(England) Callum Harrison	6
~~2020~~	NRFL Division 1	3	~~8~~	~~4~~	~~0~~	~~4~~	~~60~~	~~22~~	~~+9~~	~~12~~	~~6th~~	Cancelled	(New Zealand) Dylan Stansfield ♦	9

2021– (National League)

Season	League	Tier	League									National League									Chatham Cup	Top scorer	
Season	League	Tier	P	W	D	L	F	A	GD	Pts	Pos	P	W	D	L	F	A	GD	Pts	Pos	Chatham Cup	Name	Goals
2021	NRFL Division 1	3	17	9	3	5	35	22	+13	30	4th	Not eligible									R3	(New Zealand) Jayden Scott	10
2022	NRFL Division 1	3	22	12	3	7	42	27	+15	39	4th	Not eligible									R4	(New Zealand) Keegan Kelly	16
2023	NRFL Championship	3	22	17	0	5	60	18	+42	51	2nd	Not eligible									R2	(New Zealand) Dylan Stansfield	12
2024	Northern League	2	22	5	7	10	29	38	-9	22	9th	Did not qualify									R2	(New Zealand) Malcolm Young	10
2025	Northern League	2	22	10	6	6	32	27	+5	36	6th	Did not qualify									R2	(Canada) Guy-Frank Essome Penda	11
2026	Northern League	2	22	10	5	7	34	35	-1	35	6th	Did not qualify									R3	(Lithuania) Marius Zabarauskas	11

== Honours ==
=== Men's ===
League

- Lotto Sport Italia NRFL Premier (3): 1981, 2010, 2013
- US1 Premiership (1): 2009
- NRFL Division 1 (3): 1978, 1989, 2003

Cup

- Chatham Cup (1): 2008

Youth

- U17 National Tournament (1): 2023

=== Women's ===
League

- NRF Women's League One: 2026

== Records and statistics ==
As of 18 July 2026
Most Appearances

Rank	Player	Caps	Years
1	Joe Bresnahan	267	2002–2018
2	Philip Morcombe	257	1986–2000
3	Jason McKeown	236	2004–2022
4	Rod Grove	212	1986–2005
5	Dan Peat	210	2002–2016
6	Nick Hyde	202	1992–2011
7	Malcolm Cole	200	1980–1992
8	Jack Beguely	191	2008–2018
9	Glen Forrest	189	2002–2011
10	Steven Laus	186	1995–2004
10	Gary Seed	186	1986–2000

Most Goals

Rank	Player	Goals	Years
1	Dan Peat	104	2005–2016
2	Eddie Carlow	83*	1968–1980
3	Dylan Stansfield	80	2014–2023
4	Joe Bresnahan	59	2005–2018
5	Steven Laus	55	1995–2004
6	Alan Ogg	54	1989–1994
7	Peter Forde	50	1978–1985
8	Todd Danks	45	2002–2004
9	Judd Baker	44	2014–2019, 2022
10	Wayne Wilson	42	1978–1988

*Records incomplete

Most goals in a season

- Todd Danks, 33 goals, 2003

Most Hattricks

- Eddie Carlow, 7

Most goals in a game

- Robert McNeill, 6 goals, 1998

== Notable players ==
- Tyler Bindon — New Zealand international
- Lee Jones — New Zealand international
- Neil Jones — New Zealand international
- Anna Leat — New Zealand international
- Sam Malcolmson — New Zealand international
- Jacob Spoonley — New Zealand international
- Deklan Wynne — New Zealand international
- George Suri — Solomon Islands international
- Grant Young — South Africa international

Chatham Cup
Preceded by Central United	Winner; 2008 Chatham Cup	Succeeded by Wellington Olympic
