= Blair Scoullar =

New Zealand footballer (born 1979)

Personal information
- Full name: Blair Scoullar
- Date of birth: 30 August 1979 (age 47)
- Place of birth: Dunedin, New Zealand
- Height: 1.65 m (5 ft 5 in)
- Position: Midfielder

Senior career*
Years	Team	Apps	(Gls)
2000–2001	Ballymena United	16	(1)
- ASV Cham
2003	Charleston Battery	7	(0)
2005	Roslyn Wakari		
2005–2006	Otago United		
2006–2008	Canterbury United	25	(3)
2008–2010	Otago United	8	(0)

International career^{‡}
2000	New Zealand	1	(0)
- * Club domestic league appearances and goals as of 10 April 2009 ‡ National team caps and goals as of 31 January 2008

Blair Scoullar (born 30 August 1979) is a New Zealand soccer player who plays as a midfielder.

== International career ==
Scoullar made a solitary A-international appearance for New Zealand against Oman in Malaysia on 17 August 2000 at the Merdeka Tournament, a competition New Zealand went on to win.
