= Bay City Park =

Multi-purpose stadium

- Interactive map of Bay City Park
- Location: 54 Andersons Road, Auckland, New Zealand
- Coordinates: 36.717850°S 174.723182°E
- Owner: Auckland Council
- Operator: Auckland Council
- Capacity: 1,000
- Surface: Grass Pitch

Construction
- Opened: 22 June 1991; 35 years ago

Tenant
- East Coast Bays AFC (1991–present)

Website
- Auckland Council

Bay City Park, is a multi-purpose stadium in the suburb of Oteha in Auckland, New Zealand. It is used for football matches and cricket and is the home stadium of Northern League side East Coast Bays.

== History ==
In 1991, Bay City Park was opened as the new home of East Coast Bays.

In September 2022, FIFA announced that Bay City Park was shortlisted to be a team base camp for the 2023 FIFA Women's World Cup. On 12 December 2022, it was announced Bay City Park would be used as the training ground for the United States during the tournament. As part of being a host venue, Bay City Park received upgrades to the lower fields in order to be up to international standard. The changing rooms were also upgraded including expanding two of them and having heating installed in the club rooms. For the World Cup, a temporary gym tent was built and carpeted in the carpark with gym machines and equipment as well. On the lower fields a temporary office and operations complex were also installed.

On 12 August 2023, Bay City Park hosted its first ever night game under the new lights as East Coast Bays beat Onehunga Mangere United 4–1.

== International matches ==
Bay City Park has hosted one international match between New Zealand U-20s and Austria U-20s. This was a friendly game in the build up to the 2015 FIFA U-20 World Cup held in New Zealand. The United States also played the Philippines in an unofficial 70-minute friendly in the build up to the 2023 FIFA Women's World Cup.

24 May 2015 Friendly	New Zealand U-20	2–4	Austria U-20	North Shore
13:00	Lewis 13'; Brotherton 72'	Report	Gschweidl 6', 26'; Grillitsch 42'; Blutsch 58' (pen.)	Stadium: Bay City Park; Attendance: 500

14 July 2023 Unofficial friendly	United States Women	3–0	Philippines Women	North Shore
		Report		Stadium: Bay City Park; Attendance: 0 (Behind closed doors)
