= Dunedin Technical =

- Full name: Dunedin Technical Association Football Club
- Nickname: Tech
- Founded: 1920
- Dissolved: 2021
- Ground: Culling Park, Dunedin
- League: ODT FootballSouth Premier League
Home colours	Away colours

Dunedin Technical Association Football Club (known locally as Tech) was an amateur association football club in Dunedin, New Zealand. They competed in the ODT FootballSouth Premier League and were champions on three occasions.

== Club history ==
The club was founded as King Edward Technical College Old Boys in 1920, and changed their name to Dunedin Technical in 1980. They were based at Culling Park, in the suburb of Saint Kilda.

The club regularly reached the later stages of the Chatham Cup (New Zealand's premier knockout football competition), and reached the final on four occasions, in each of which they met a team from Auckland. Their sole win was in 1999, when they beat Waitakere City FC 4–0. They were losing finalists in 1964 (under their former name), 1998, and 2008.

Their respective women's team won the Kingsgate Women's Premier League six times in a row in the 2013 - 2018 seasons, also reaching the quarter-finals of the National Women's Knockout Cup on two occasions, semi finals in 2017, and winning the Kate Sheppard Cup (the renamed Knockout Cup) against Forrest Hill Milford in 2018.

Dunedin Technical's best season in the New Zealand National Soccer League was in 2000, when they finished third. The previous year they had reached the final of the national league competition, which at that time was run as separate North and South Island leagues, followed by a final between the winners of these two leagues.

Prior to the creation of a national league in 1970, King Edward Technical College Old Boys were Otago regional champions in 1934, 1955, 1957, and 1963.

In 2021, Dunedin Technical AFC merged with Caversham AFC, Melchester Rovers and Hereweka to form Dunedin City Royals. Dunedin Technical’s history, facilities, and player base were incorporated into the new organisation, marking the end of the club’s independent existence and its continuation under the Dunedin City Royals name.

== Notable players ==
- (New Zealand) Andrew Boyens
- (New Zealand) Sam Jasper
- (New Zealand) Neil Jones
- (New Zealand) Graham Marshall
- (New Zealand) Emily Morison
- (Germany) Lutz Pfannenstiel
- (New Zealand) Blair Scoullar

Chatham Cup
Preceded by Central United	Winner; 1999 Chatham Cup	Succeeded by Napier City Rovers

Kate Sheppard Cup
Preceded by Glenfield Rovers	Winner; 2018 Kate Sheppard Cup	Succeeded by Eastern Suburbs
