= Caledonian Ground =

Sports venue in Dunedin, New Zealand

Coordinates: 45.8633°S 170.5270°E

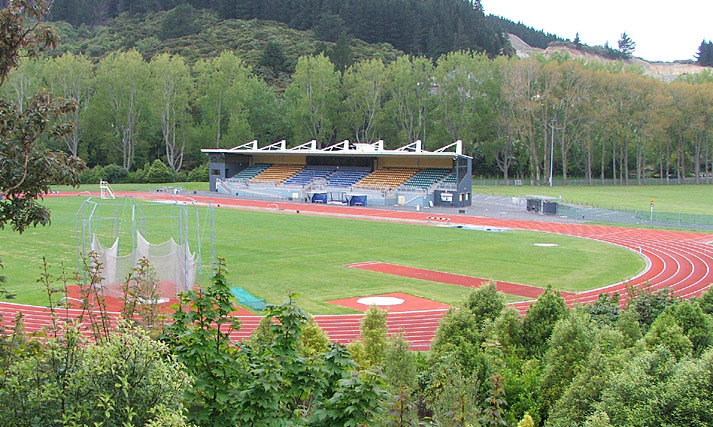
The Caledonian Ground.

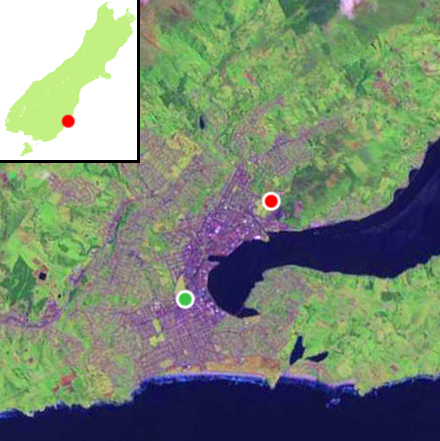
Current and former locations of the Caledonian Ground within Dunedin's urban area are shown by the red and green dots respectively.

The Caledonian Ground, often simply known as "The Caley", is a major sports venue in the New Zealand city of Dunedin. It is primarily used for football (soccer) and athletics, and has a capacity of 7,500.

== Location ==
The Caledonian Ground is at the northern end of Logan Park in Dunedin North. It is close to Logan Park High School and close to the University of Otago and Otago Polytechnic. Other major sports venues are located nearby, including the University Oval and the Forsyth Barr Stadium at University Plaza. The ground is nestled at the very edge of the floodplain of the Water of Leith, against the foothills of Signal Hill. Opoho creek, a tributary of the Leith, lies to the immediate east of the ground.

== History ==
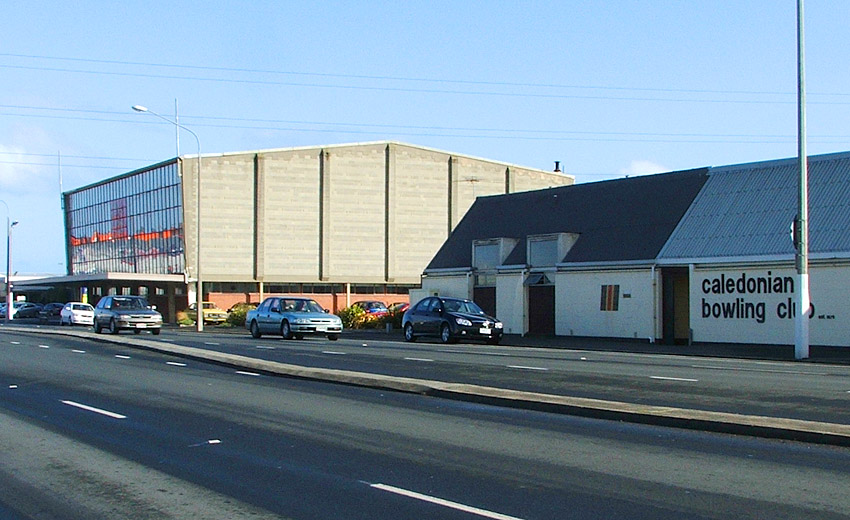
A gymnasium is all that remain of the former Caledonian Ground complex in South Dunedin.

The venue is often referred to by Dunedinities as the New Caledonian Ground, an indication that the ground has not long been at its current site. Until 2000 the Caledonian Ground was located in the heart of South Dunedin, at the corner of Hillside Road and Andersons Bay Road, some five kilometres to the south. The ground's former site is now largely occupied by the car park of one of the city's main shopping centres. All that remains of the former ground is a gymnasium, which is a World War II war memorial. A bowling club, which survived the original move, closed and was bulldozed in 2015.

The original Caledonian complex dated back to 1876, when the city's Caledonian Society moved to South Dunedin from their home at the North Ground in Dunedin North. The ground, and its grandstand, were purchased by the Dunedin City Council in 1943, and were extensively developed after public meetings in late 1950 to decide on a public utility which could also serve as a war memorial.

The original Caledonian Ground hosted New Zealand's first National Athletics Championships in December 1889, and also New Zealand's first international football (soccer) match, albeit not officially a full international. On 23 July 1904 New Zealand lost 0–1 at the Caledonian to a New South Wales representative XI. The ground also served as the city's main cycling venue for many years, and was sporadically used as a first-class cricket venue between 1880 and 1904, hosting four matches.

The Caledonian was also the site of the first human ascent in a hot-air balloon in New Zealand — and first parachute descent — performed by travelling showman Thomas Scott Baldwin on 21 January 1889.

== Usage ==
The Caledonian Ground is used as the city's main athletics track, and is also one of Dunedin's primary soccer venues; Otago United formerly played many of their home games at the Caledonian Ground, and it has been the host ground for several later-round stages of the Chatham Cup, including a semi-final in the 2008 competition.
