= Caversham AFC =

- Full name: Caversham Association Football Club
- Nicknames: Cavy, Train
- Founded: 1931
- Dissolved: 2020; 6 years ago
- Ground: Hancock Park, Dunedin
- Capacity: 500- 536
- President: Phil Collings
- Manager: Hamish Vodane
- Coach: Richard Murray
- League: ODT FootballSouth Premier League, Southern Football League
- 2018: ODT FootballSouth Premier League, 4th
- Website: https://www.cavershamafc.co.nz
Home colours	Away colours

Caversham is an association football club based in Dunedin, New Zealand. They compete in the ODT FootballSouth Premier League.

They are named for the suburb of Caversham to the southwest of Dunedin's city centre, best known for its former international sports venue Carisbrook. Caversham AFC, however, are based not there but at Tonga Park, located one kilometre to the south in the suburb of Forbury.

== Club history ==
Caversham AFC was founded in 1931, and has been based at Tonga Park throughout its history.

Caversham's premier team home strip is a white jersey with wide red band, white shorts, and red socks. The away strip is forest green shirt, greenish-white shorts, and forest green socks. Until 2009, their home strip was a red shirt with a broad horizontal black band edged in white, red shorts with a similar band across the left leg, and black socks. That kit is now used by the club's second XI.

Caversham competed in the former New Zealand national league from 1971 to 1973 and from 1975 to 1977, competing in the first of those seasons as part of an amalgamated Dunedin Suburbs team. Their best performance came in 1976, when they finished third. They have reached the semi-finals of the Chatham Cup on six occasions (in 1970, 2006, 2007, 2010, 2011, and 2012), though they have yet to appear in a final.

Caversham won 15 titles from 2000 to 2017.

Caversham had a poor 2018 by their standards in the ODT Football South Premier League, finishing fourth after eight games.

=== Notable former squad members ===
- (New Zealand) (GK) Jason Batty
- (New Zealand) (FW) Nathan McCullum
- (New Zealand) (DF) Alex McGregor
- (New Zealand) (GK/DF/MF/FW) Richard Murray
- (New Zealand) (DF) Rupesh Puna
- (New Zealand) (DF) Maurice Tillotson

== Tonga Park ==
The club's home ground is Tonga Park. This lies immediately south of Caversham in the suburb of Forbury. Caversham's clubrooms are located on the west side of the ground, on Surrey Street (45°54′10″S 170°29′25″E).

The park is bounded on two sides by schools – the twin single-sex secondary schools of King's High School and Queen's High School, and the intermediate Bathgate School. Originally used for rugby league and known by a variety of names, including Mammoth Park, The Stadium, and The Speedway, it was renamed Tonga Park (tonga is Māori for 'south') after it was purchased by Dunedin City Council in 1932.

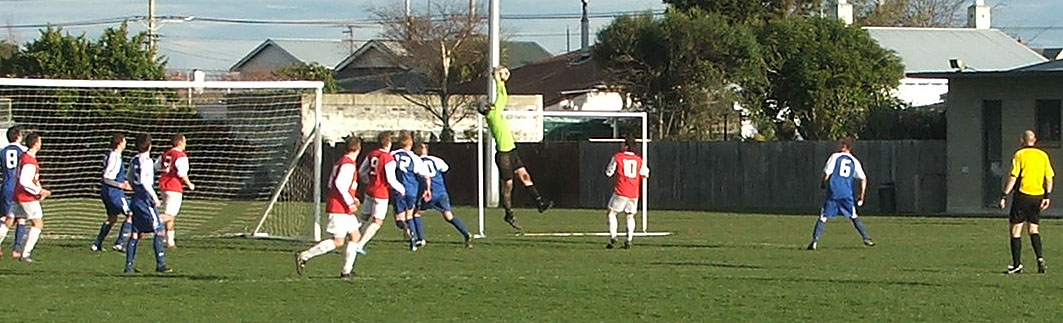
The Mosgiel goalkeeper stops a Caversham cross from reaching its target, Tonga Park, Dunedin, 31 July 2010.
