= Maycenvale United =

- Full name: Maycenvale United Association Football Club
- Founded: 1975; 51 years ago
- Ground: Hastings Sports Park, Hastings
- League: Eastern Premiership
- 2026: Eastern Premiership, 6th of 8
Home colours	Away colours

Maycenvale United AFC is a semi-professional football (soccer) club based in Hastings, New Zealand. They compete in the Eastern Premiership. The club is strongly 'family orientated' club with over 200 playing members both seniors and many junior football teams.

== History ==
The name Maycenvale comes from three Hastings primary schools, Mayfair, Central and Park Vale; when the club started with five Junior teams in 1975, most of the children came from one of these three schools.

The club boasts a rich history of competing at the highest levels in Hawke's Bay with a number of titles over the years. The club currently has a Premiership, reserves and two conference league teams in the local Hawke's Bay competitions.
