= Upper Hutt City FC =

Upper Hutt City Football
- Full name: Upper Hutt City Football inc Tararua Sports Club
- Founded: 1926 as Upper Hutt United
- Ground: Maidstone Park, Upper Hutt
- Chairman: Brent Windelburn
- Manager: Toby Wilton
- League: Central League
- 2026: Central League, 5th of 10
Home colours	Away colours

Upper Hutt City Football is an association football club in Upper Hutt, Wellington Region, which plays its home games at Maidstone Park. The club competes in the Central League.

Upper Hutt City Football started as Upper Hutt United in 1926 and then alternative clubs were formed in the region through Tararua United in the 1970s and a women's club, Upper Valley Wanderers in the 1980s. In the late 1990s the three clubs agreed to amalgamate as Tararua Sports Club with their clubrooms and home ground based at Harcourt Park. At a meeting in 1998 it was agreed that the football teams would play as Upper Hutt City Soccer before they were renamed Upper Hutt City Football in 2011.

After construction of an artificial surface pitch at Maidstone Park in 2011 it was decided in 2012 to move the clubrooms and home pitch to the park while still retaining Harcourt Park as its alternative home ground.

== Teams ==
=== Senior men's ===
- Upper Hutt City 1sts (Central league)
- Upper Hutt City 2nds (Capital Premier)
- Upper Hutt City 3rds (Capital 2)
- Upper Hutt City Hooligans (Capital 2)
- Upper Hutt City Creeps (Capital 8)
- Upper Hutt City Marauders (Capital 9)
- Youth U19s and U17s

Upper Hutt City Football also runs an annual Men's U19s Tournament (the Parapine ITM Bob Bamford Memorial Tournament) in preparation for the national champs in Napier.

=== Masters ===
- Upper Hutt City Saints (Master 1)
- Upper Hutt City RJs (Masters 2)

=== Women's ===
- Girls' U18s

The Women's team highest national honours is the semi-finals of the 2016 Women's Knockout Cup which they lost to Glenfield Rovers 1–0 and the 2017 Women's Knockout Cup which they lost to Eastern Suburbs 5–0.

Women's Premier Team Honours:

- 2016 – National Women's Knockout Cup semi-finalist
- 2017 – National Women's Knockout Cup semi-finalist
- 2017 - Kelly Cup Winners
- 2017 - W League Winners

== Club officials ==
=== Technical staff ===
As of 7 May 2026

Position	Staff
Head coach	(New Zealand) Toby Wilton
Assistant coach	(New Zealand) Jacob Marshall
Assistant coach	(New Zealand) Jonathan Winkworth
Physio	Caeshlyn Murdoch
Physio	(New Zealand) Diane Shirer
