= Western Suburbs FC =

Western Suburbs Football Club
- Full name: Western Suburbs Football Club
- Nickname: Wests
- Founded: 1906, as Mental Hospital AFC
- Ground: Endeavour Park, Porirua
- Manager: Brian McInnes
- Coach: Matt Calvert and Michal Walesiak
- League: Central League
- 2026: Central League, 4th of 10
- Website: westernsuburbs.co.nz
Home colours	Away colours

Western Suburbs Football Club is an association football club in Porirua, New Zealand. They play their home matches at Endeavour Park in the Porirua suburb of Whitby and compete in the Central League.

Western Suburbs is in partnership with Olé Football Academy who provide coaching for some of their junior and senior teams. They have won the Chatham Cup thrice, and the Central Premier League on seven occasions, most recently in 2019.

== History ==
=== Mental Hospital AFC ===
Western Suburbs was established in 1906 as Mental Hospital AFC, initially as a recreational outlet for staff at Porirua Mental Hospital, winning the Chatham Cup in 1935, beating Christchurch's Western 2–0.

=== Western Suburbs (1956–1973) ===
In 1956 the name of the club changed to Western Suburbs, reflecting its player base from Porirua and Tawa. Led by Hungarian-born coach Imre Kiss, who had represented New Zealand for one official international in 1967, the club won the Central League First Division title in 1968 and again in 1969, qualifying for the inaugural season of the National League in 1970. That year they lost the Chatham Cup to Blockhouse Bay after a replay, but achieved success for the second time in their history the following year, beating Wellington City 3–2 in the 1971 final. Western Suburbs were relegated from the National League at the end of the 1971 season.

=== Porirua United ===
The club name was changed to Porirua United in 1973 when Porirua gained city status. Shortly after, a faction within the club broke away to form rival club Tawa AFC. Porirua United won the Central League title in 1974

=== Porirua Viard United ===
At the end of the 1983 season Porirua United and Viard amalgamated to become Porirua Viard United. The women's team were joint National Champions in 1987, drawing the grand final with Auckland's Eden. In 1992 Porirua Viard United amalgamated with Mana United, forming Western Suburbs.

=== Western Suburbs (1992–present) ===
Over the last 10 years, the club won two Central League First Division titles, participated in the North Island League in 1999, finishing 8th. Wests also won the inaugural Capital Federation Championship in 2000.

The 2001 season was an up-and-down season under Ken Cresswell. After a poor start the team managed to get back on track finishing a respectable 3rd-place finish.

2002 brought a new coach, a new attitude and a few new faces to Wests. Ex-Wests captain, Martin Disley, took over as coach from Ken Cresswell, who had gone to Wellington United in the off-season. Wests scored 27 goals in their final 5 games of the season, conceding just 7. With just 2 games remaining, Wests took the lead from Lower Hutt and needed a win against Petone in the final game of the season to secure their 4th League title in six years. Following their 2002 League Title, Wests went on to dispose of Havelock in the Regional Playoff 11–0 on aggregate. The National League Promotion Playoff was a mixed bag for Wests, picking up a win, a draw and a loss against Waitakere, Glenfield and Caversham respectively.

In 2003 and 2004 the club performed well losing only 3 and 2 games in each season. However it was not good enough to win and only second and third placings were achieved in the Capital Premier Competition.

2005 saw the return of the Central League after the dissolution of the National League in favour of the New Zealand Football Championship competition. Western Suburbs became the first team to win the renewed competition, however the team was knocked out of the Chatham Cup in the 3rd round for fielding an ineligible player.

In 2006, the centenary year of the club, the club failed to defend their Central League title, finishing runners up. However Wests managed to reach the Chatham Cup final, winning the trophy after defeating Eastern Suburbs 3–0 on penalties after a scoreless draw. Western Suburbs was officially recognised as Porirua City's Team of the Year.

The 2007 season saw Western Suburbs winning the Central Premier League title, however they failed to defend their Chatham Cup title, losing to Central United 10–9 on penalties after a scoreless draw.

== Current squad ==
As of 11 April 2025

Note: Flags indicate national team as defined under FIFA eligibility rules; some limited exceptions apply. Players may hold more than one non-FIFA nationality.

No.	Pos.	Nation	Player
1	GK	GUY	Quillan Roberts
2	DF	NZL	Jamie Wildash-Chan
3	DF	NZL	Lucas Finnigan
4	DF	NZL	Tom Scott
5	DF	USA	Sebastian Sanchez
6	MF	ENG	Harry Fautley
7	DF	USA	Jonathan Robinson
8	MF	NZL	Anthony Jensen
9	FW	SWE	Alex Andersson
10	FW	NZL	Sebastian Barton-Ginger
11	FW	NZL	Kaelin Nguyen
12	GK	ENG	Matthew Calvert
13	MF	NZL	Noah Tipene-Clegg

No.	Pos.	Nation	Player
14	MF	NZL	Dakota Brady
15	MF	NZL	Caleb Hunt
16	DF	NZL	Lewis Miller
17	DF	TGA	Alifeleti Peini
18	MF	NZL	Blake Inder
19	MF	SAM	Malakye Paterson
20	MF	NZL	Cameron MacKenzie
21	MF	NZL	Finn Diamond
22	DF	NZL	Rakshan Suresh
23	MF	NZL	Max Tebbutt
24	DF	NZL	Hamish Clark
26	MF	NZL	Alex Hawkes
37	DF	NZL	Jackson Bigwood

== Honours ==
- Central Premier League (6): 1996, 1998, 2005, 2007, 2009, 2017, 2019

Chatham Cup
Preceded by Thistle	Winner*; 1935 Chatham Cup	Succeeded by Western
Preceded by Blockhouse Bay	Winner; 1971 Chatham Cup	Succeeded by Christchurch United
Preceded by Central United	Winner; 2006 Chatham Cup	Succeeded by Central United
