= Mangere United =

Mangere United AFC
- Full name: Mangere United Association Football Club
- Nickname: Mangere
- Founded: 2000
- Ground: Centre Park, Mangere, New Zealand
- Capacity: 3,000
- Chairman: Vish Dewan
- League: NRF League One
- 2026: NRF League One, 6th of 8

Mangere United is a football (soccer) club in Mangere, Auckland, New Zealand. The club competes in the NRF League One.

In 2018, Mangere United went in a partnership with fellow South Auckland club Manukau City to form Manukau United, who currently play in the Northern League.

== History ==
In 2000, it became evident that there was a large Fijian Indian population in Auckland, including young men who played or wished to play football with an established club. The founders of the club chose Mangere as a suitable location. The founders of the Club are Mohammed Imran, James Kado, Patrick Herman and Ramu Prasad.

== Playing strip and emblem ==
The club colours includes one colour of the Fiji national football team kit. Black strip is also the colour of Fijian giants Ba FC. The Fijian Indian element can be seen on their emblem with a Fijian whale tooth carving holding a prominent place.

== Home ground ==
The club's home ground is Centre Park in Mangere. It previously housed a club rooms, which burnt down in 2005. A major renovation of the ground saw a small stadium being built in 2011, along with landscaping of an embankment area for further seating. The ground is home of ethnic and Fijian tournaments in Auckland and junior and women's international games have been held.

== Derby ==
A loose derby exists with Onehunga-Mangere United due to name and location similarities between the clubs. In the derby context, Mangere United is known as Onehunga-Mangere's cousins from the valley (Onehunga-Mangere's home ground being on the top of an extinct volcano).

== Interesting facts ==
Mangere United's war cry commences before each game without fail. It includes all players entering into a huddle, placing one hand in the centre and yell "Mangere". It is, along with Central United and South Auckland Rangers, the last remaining ethnic club in Auckland. The lingua franca spoken by the players during games is Fijian Hindi, with English generally spoken to players of a non Fijian origin.

The club was set for promotion to the Lotto Sport Italia NRFL Division 1 when it played the 2009 promotion match with Papatoetoe AFC. Over half of the first team roster made themselves unavailable after accepting invitations to play in a Fijian-Indian football tournament in Los Angeles on the same weekend. Not surprisingly, the club lost out on promotion.

== Honours ==
- Northern League Division Three (2001)
- Northern League Division Two (2002)
- Lotto Sport Italia NRFL Division 2 (2010)

== Notable players ==
Mangere United has several former and current players who have represented their country at various levels:

- Vishal Lal – Played for Fiji at U17
- Sumendra Pooni – Played for Fiji at U17
- Justin Fredrickson – Played for New Zealand at U16
- Naveen Prasad – Played for New Zealand at U16 and U17
- Stu Bola – Played for Fiji at senior level
- David Firisua – Played for Solomon Islands at senior level
- Surfsraz Ali Akbar – Played for Fiji at U17, U19, U21 and U23
- Sumeet Shankaran – Played for Fiji at U20 and U23
- William Lasaqa – Played for Fiji at senior level
- Krishna Samy – Played for Fiji at senior level
- (Nigeria) Sanni Issa
- (Croatia) Mario Bilen
- Salesh Kumar – Played for Fiji at senior level
- Shameel Rao – Played for Fiji at senior level
- (El Salvador) Ernesto Lopez
- (South Korea) Dae Wook Kim
