= Miramar Rangers AFC =

Miramar Rangers
- Full name: Miramar Rangers AFC
- Founded: 1907; 119 years ago
- Ground: David Farrington Park, Wellington
- Chairman: John Cameron
- Head Coach: Jamie O'Connor
- League: National League
- 2026: Central League, 3rd of 10; National League, TBD
- Website: miramarrangers.co.nz
| Home colours | Away colours |

Miramar Rangers AFC is a New Zealand association football club in the Wellington suburb of Miramar. The club competes in the National League. The club is one of the most successful in New Zealand, having won the Chatham Cup four times and the National League title twice. Over the last decade the club has played in the Central League and has won the division seven times, most recently in 2020.

In 2004 it became one of the founding principal clubs of the Team Wellington franchise in the ASB Premiership.

== Club history ==
Chart of yearly ladder positions for Miramar Rangers in 1st division

Miramar won the Chatham Cup, New Zealand's premier knockout tournaments for men, in 1966, 1992, 2004 and 2010, and were Central League winners in 1997, 2006, 2008, 2011, 2013, 2014 and 2020. Miramar also won the now-defunct club National League in 2002 and 2003; the latter was the final National League season before it was revived again in 2021, which Miramar have since qualified for the Championship phase.

In 2021, in the first year under the new format, Miramar Rangers won the National League: South Central Series, a competition replacing the cancelled National League season that featured the qualifying teams from the Central and Southern regions. It beat Wellington Olympic 7-2 in the Grand Final.

Miramar Rangers were promoted to the Women's Central League for the 2025 season, where they finished 7th, and then 6th in 2026. They have also competed in the Kate Sheppard Cup, reaching the third round in 2025 and 2026.

Oceania Footballer of the Century Wynton Rufer played 8 games for the club in the 1982 season.

== Stadium ==
Miramar Rangers play all their home games at David Farrington Park in Miramar.

== Major honours ==
- New Zealand National Soccer League/New Zealand National League

Champions (3): 2002, 2003, 2021
Premiers (1): 2021

- Central League winners

Champions (7): 1997, 2006, 2008, 2011, 2013, 2014, 2020

- Chatham Cup

Winners (4): 1966, 1992, 2004, 2010

Chatham Cup
| Preceded by Eastern Suburbs | Winner; 1966 Chatham Cup | Succeeded by North Shore United |
| Preceded by Christchurch United | Winner; 1992 Chatham Cup | Succeeded by Napier City Rovers |
| Preceded by University-Mount Wellington | Winner; 2004 Chatham Cup | Succeeded by Central United |
| Preceded by Wellington Olympic | Winner; 2010 Chatham Cup | Succeeded by Wairarapa United |

== Season by season record ==
2021– (National League)

| Season | Central League | | | | | | | | | National League | | | | | | | | | Chatham Cup | Top scorer | |
| Season | P | W | D | L | F | A | GD | Pts | Pos | P | W | D | L | F | A | GD | Pts | Pos | Chatham Cup | Name | Goals |
|---|---|---|---|---|---|---|---|---|---|---|---|---|---|---|---|---|---|---|---|---|---|
| 2021 | 18 | 13 | 3 | 2 | 64 | 17 | +47 | 42 | 2nd | 5 | 3 | 2 | 0 | 13 | 10 | +3 | 11 | 1st | F | (England) Sam Mason-Smith | 18 |
| 2022 | 18 | 12 | 4 | 2 | 63 | 19 | +44 | 40 | 2nd | 9 | 1 | 1 | 7 | 11 | 25 | −14 | 4 | 10th | QF | (New Zealand) Hamish Watson | 19 |
| 2023 | 18 | 8 | 0 | 10 | 37 | 43 | -6 | 24 | 7th | Did not qualify | | | | | | | | | R2 | (England) Sam Mason-Smith | 8 |
| 2024 | 18 | 11 | 2 | 5 | 61 | 21 | +40 | 35 | 4th | Did not qualify | | | | | | | | | R4 | (New Zealand) Sam Mason-Smith | 14 |
| 2025 | 18 | 12 | 3 | 3 | 53 | 22 | +31 | 39 | 2nd | 10 | 6 | 1 | 3 | 25 | 14 | +11 | 19 | 3rd | R3 | (Uruguay) Martín Bueno | 28 |
| 2026 | 18 | 12 | 5 | 1 | 47 | 14 | +33 | 41 | 3rd | Qualified | | | | | | | | | QF | (Uruguay) Martín Bueno | 16 |

== League records ==
Most appearances

- Stu Jacobs: 220 (1984–2000)
- David Chote: 209 (1983–1997)
- Peter Chote: 158 (1981–1987)
- Bobby Peel: 122 (1986–1992)
- Mark Cummings: 110 (1981–1991)
- Costa Leonidas: 106 (1981–1989)
- Brent Pratt: 105 (1981–1989)

Most goals

- David Chote: 68 (1983–1997)
- Graham Little: 48 (2001–2003)
- John Murphy: 48 (1991–1998)

Biggest win

- 13-0 vs Wellington United (2019)

Biggest defeat

- 0-8 vs Christchurch United (1988)
- 0-8 v Lower Hutt City (1996)
- 0-8 v Wanganui East Athletic (1996)

Most goals in a season

- 22 (John Murphy, 1991)

== Notable former players ==
- Justin Fashanu (1997)
- Phil Alexander (1983–1985)
- Tim Brown (1995–2000)
- Vaughan Coveny (1991–1992)
- Tom Doyle (2012)
- Malcolm Dunford (1990)
- Simon Elliott (1996–1997)
- Henry Fa'arodo (2011–2012)
- Raf de Gregorio (2005–2008)
- Chris Killen (1995–1998)
- Tremaine Rimene-Albrett (2022)
- Wynton Rufer (1982)
- Grant Turner (1986)
- Barry Pickering (1982–1986)
- Michael Utting (1992, 1994–1996)
- Julie Harvey
