= Bay Olympic FC =

Bay Olympic
- Full name: Bay Olympic Football Club
- Nickname: The Bay
- Founded: 1998 (as Bay Olympic Soccer and Sports Club)
- Ground: Olympic Park; New Lynn, Auckland
- Capacity: 3,500
- Chairman: Aidan Lovelock
- Head coach: Rhys Ruka
- League: Northern League
- 2026: Northern League, 11th of 12
- Website: https://www.bayolympic.co.nz/
Home colours

Bay Olympic is a semi professional association football club based in New Lynn, Auckland, New Zealand. They currently compete in the Northern League. They have won the NRFL Premier League three times.

== History ==
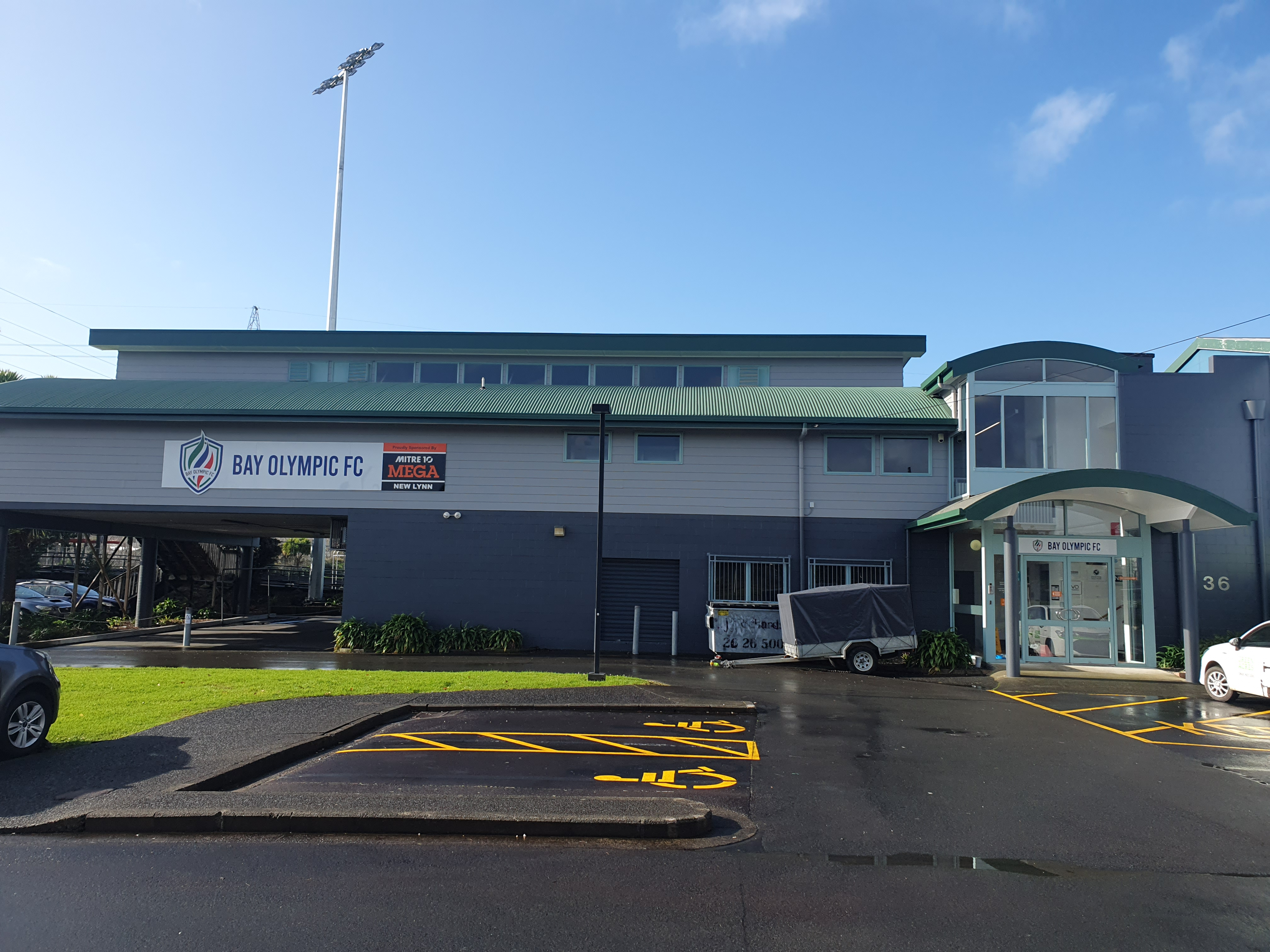
The Bay Olympic clubrooms at Olympic Park

The club was formed from the merger of Blockhouse Bay (founded 1948) and Green Bay-Titirangi United (founded 1973) in 1998. Blockhouse Bay had been a prominent Auckland team, and were winners of the 1970 Chatham Cup, and losing finalists in 1975. Bay Olympic were losing finalists of the 2010 Chatham Cup. They made it to the semi-final stage of the Chatham Cup for 2011 and also won the 2011 NRFL Premier League.

Bay Olympic ended the 2018 Lotto Sport Italia NRFL Premier in the 12th spot, being relegated to Division One.

== Season by season record ==
Season	Qualifying league	League									National League									Chatham Cup	Top scorer	
Season	Qualifying league	P	W	D	L	F	A	GD	Pts	Pos	P	W	D	L	F	A	GD	Pts	Pos	Chatham Cup	Name	Goals
2021	Northern League	18	7	4	7	26	38	–12	25	6th	Did not qualify									R5	(South Korea) Han Hong-gyu	5
2022	Northern League	22	7	2	13	34	46	–12	23	8th	Did not qualify									R5	(England) Darren White	7
2023	Northern League	22	4	3	15	33	55	–22	15	10th	Did not qualify									R3	(Germany) Ibrahim Nadir	10
2024	Northern League	22	9	1	12	39	42	−3	28	6th	Did not qualify									R3	(Germany) Ibrahim Nadir	7

Chart of yearly ladder positions for Bay Olympic in NZ 1st division soccer

	Champions
	Runners-up
	Third Place
♦	Top scorer in competition

Chatham Cup
Preceded by Eastern Suburbs	Winner*; 1970 Chatham Cup	Succeeded by Western Suburbs
