= Central United F.C. =

New Zealand football club

Central United FC
- Full name: Central United Football Club
- Nickname: Central
- Founded: 1962; 64 years ago (as Central Soccer Club)
- Ground: Kiwitea Street
- Capacity: 3,500
- Chairman: (New Zealand) Mate Tolj
- Manager: (New Zealand) Ashleigh Taylor
- League: NRFL Northern Conference
- 2026: NRFL Northern Conference, 4th of 8
Home colours

Central United Football Club is an amateur association football club based in Sandringham, Auckland, New Zealand who complete in the NRFL Northern Conference.

Founded in 1962 by Croatian immigrants (most of whom were from Dalmatia), the team was officially called Central Soccer Club until 1996 when it changed its name to "Central United Football Club".

== History ==
Following a restructure of New Zealand's national league system their spot in the Northern League was taken by sister club Auckland City FC ahead of the 2021 season they subsequently entered the NRF Championship in 2022.

== Season by season record ==
=== National League ===
Season	Qualifying league	League									National League									Chatham Cup	Top scorer	
Season	Qualifying league	P	W	D	L	F	A	GD	Pts	Pos	P	W	D	L	F	A	GD	Pts	Pos	Chatham Cup	Name	Goals
2021	NRF Championship	—									Not eligible									—	—N/a	—N/a
2022	NRF Championship	21	16	2	3	70	31	+39	50	1st ↑	Not eligible									R3	Unknown	
2023	NRFL Conference	16	4	3	9	22	42	−20	15	9th ↓	Not eligible									PR	(New Zealand) Ben Ruffell, (New Zealand) Luke Pank	4
2024	NRF League One	21	16	3	2	78	27	+51	51	1st ↑	Not eligible									R3	(New Zealand) Sam Lloyd	18
2025	NRFL Conference	20	10	5	5	44	32	+12	35	2nd	Not eligible									R2	(New Zealand) Sam Lloyd ♦	14
2026	NRFL Conference	21	8	6	7	40	34	+6	30	4th	Not eligible									R2	(New Zealand) Dillon Houching	6

Season	League											Chatham Cup	Notes	Top scorer	
Season	Division	Tier	P	W	D	L	GF	GA	GD	Pts	Pos	Chatham Cup	Notes	Name	Goals
2027	TBD	TBD									TBD				

	Champions
↑	Promoted
↓	Relegated
♦	Top scorer in competition

== International competitions record ==
=== Continental ===
Continental results
Season	Competition	Round	Club		Home	Away	Aggregate
1999	Oceania Club Championship	Group C	(Tonga)	Lotoha'apai	16–0		1st
1999	Oceania Club Championship	Group C	(Vanuatu)	Tafea	2–2		1st
1999	Oceania Club Championship	SF	(Fiji)	Nadi	0–1		

== Honours ==
Chart of yearly ladder positions for Central United in NZ 1st division soccer

- New Zealand National Soccer League
  - Champions (2): 1999, 2001
- Northern League
  - Champions (4): 2004, 2007, 2008, 2016
- NRF League One
  - Champions (2): 2022, 2024
- Chatham Cup
  - Champions (5): 1997, 1998, 2005, 2007, 2012

Chatham Cup
Preceded by Waitakere City	Winner; 1997 Chatham Cup	Succeeded by Central United
Preceded by Central United	Winner; 1998 Chatham Cup	Succeeded by Dunedin Technical
Preceded by Miramar Rangers	Winner; 2005 Chatham Cup	Succeeded by Western Suburbs
Preceded by Western Suburbs	Winner; 2007 Chatham Cup	Succeeded by East Coast Bays
Preceded by Wairarapa United	Winner; 2012 Chatham Cup	Succeeded by Cashmere Technical
