= Takapuna AFC =

Takapuna
- Full name: Takapuna Association Football Club
- Nickname: Taka
- Founded: 1964; 62 years ago
- Ground: Taharoto Park, Takapuna
- Chairman: Glyn Taylor
- Coach: Daniel Semp
- League: Northern League
- 2026: NRFL Championship, 2nd of 12 (promoted)
- Website: www.takapunaafc.co.nz
Home colours

Takapuna is a Semi-Professional football club based in Takapuna, New Zealand. The club competes in the Northern League.

== History ==
The club was founded as Takapuna City AFC in 1964 as a junior club, with the first senior men's teams being added in 1967. By 1971 they were playing in the Northern league first division, a competition which they won at their first attempt. They entered the New Zealand National Soccer League for the first time in 1981 but only lasted one season before being relegated. Their best results in the Chatham Cup was making the semi-finals in 1980 and 1999.
