= Waitakere City FC =

Waitakere City
- Full name: Waitakere City Football Club
- Founded: 1989
- Dissolved: 2020
- Ground: Fred Taylor Park, Whenuapai
- Chairman: Peter Bult
- Coach: Thomas Mason
- League: NRFL Premier
- 2020: NRFL Premier, 11th
Home colours	Away colours

Waitakere City F.C. was a New Zealand football club. They merged with Norwest United in 2021 to form West Coast Rangers. They last competed in the Lotto Sport Italia NRFL Premier League.

== History ==
Chart of yearly ladder positions for Waitakere City in NZ 1st division soccer

It was formed in 1989 with the purpose of representing West Auckland in the National Soccer League. At first the club was located in Western Springs, but following a merger with Massey AFC in 1991, it moved to its current location, at Fred Taylor Park in Whenuapai, West Auckland.

Waitakere City F.C. quickly established itself as one of New Zealand's top clubs, winning the national championship on five occasions (1990, 1992, 1995, 1996 and 1997) and finishing as the runner-up once (1993). They also have three Chatham Cup wins to their name (1994, 1995 and 1996) and they finished as runners-up four times (1999, 2004, 2013 and 2016).

== Honours ==
- New Zealand National Soccer League
  - Champions (5): 1990, 1992, 1995, 1996, 1997
- Lotto Sport Italia NRFL Division 1
  - Champions (1): 2016
- Chatham Cup
  - Champions (3): 1994, 1995, 1996

Chatham Cup
Preceded by Napier City Rovers	Winner; 1994 Chatham Cup	Succeeded by Waitakere City
Preceded by Waitakere City	Winner; 1995 Chatham Cup	Succeeded by Waitakere City
Preceded by Waitakere City	Winner; 1996 Chatham Cup	Succeeded by Central United
