= 1965 Chatham Cup =

Tournament details
- Venue(s): Basin Reserve, Wellington
- Dates: 4 September 1965

Final positions
- Champions: Eastern Suburbs (3rd title)
- Runners-up: Saint Kilda

The 1965 Chatham Cup was the 38th annual nationwide knockout football competition in New Zealand.

The competition was run on a regional basis, with 18 regional associations holding separate qualification rounds. The winners of each of these qualification tournaments, along with the second-placed team from Auckland, qualified for the competition proper. In all, 104 teams took part in the competition, 33 from the South Island and 71 from the North Island. Note: Different sources record different numbers for the rounds of this competition, with some confusion caused by differing numbers of rounds in regional qualification.

Christchurch City's 19–1 Fifth Round demolition of Timaru's Northern Hearts was the largest known victory in any Chatham Cup match until Metro's 21–0 demolition of Norwest in 1998.

== The 1965 final ==
The final was played in a stiff Wellington southerly, which St. Kilda captain Alex Caldwell opted to use in the first half. Despite this advantage, the Otago side found themselves on the back foot against a far stronger Auckland team. Suburbs rebuffed St. Kilda's attacks in the first twenty minutes before moving the ball forward themselves. Centre-forward Trefor Pugh scored first for the Auckland side, though Brian Slinn levelled the scores before the break. In the second half, playing with the aid of the wind, Suburbs' class proved too much for the southerners. John Legg added a second for Suburbs 12 minutes into the second spell, and a mistimed clearance from St. Kilda keeper Malcolm Barnes found Pugh, who hit a volley into the St. Kilda goal. The fourth Eastern Suburbs goal came when a shot by John Wrathall was parried straight into the path of Legg, who hit the ball past the keeper into the net.

== Results ==
=== Third round ===
Christchurch City	2–1	Christchurch HSOB

Claudelands Rovers (Hamilton)	4–2	Hamilton

Diamond (Wellington)	5–2	Petone

Eastern Suburbs (Auckland)	7–1	North Shore United

Eastern Union (Gisborne)	3–1	Riverina

Gore Wanderers	4–2	Old Boys (Invercargill)

Grey Lynn	3–2	East Coast Bays

Hungaria (Wellington)	5–3	Johnson Villa (Wellington)

Invercargill United	3–1	Waihopai (Invercargill)

Kahukura (Rotorua)	8–1	Greerton Rovers

Motueka	4–2	Richmond Athletic

Mount Wellington	3–2	Eden

Napier Rovers	7–1	Hastings United

Wellington Northern	6–1	Upper Hutt United

Otago University	5–1	Mosgiel

Otangarei United (Whangarei)	6–2	Kaikohe

Palmerston North Thistle	8–1	Masterton Athletic

Pukekohe Ramblers	1 – 1*	Manurewa

Saint Kilda	3–0	Northern

Waitara	3–2	Moturoa

Wanganui United	1–0	Western Suburbs FC (Wellington)

Waterside Wellington	2–1	Miramar Rangers

Western (Christchurch)	4–1	Waterside Canterbury

- Pukekohe won on corners

=== Fourth round ===
Christchurch City	2–0	Western (Christchurch)

Claudelands Rovers	2–5	Eastern Suburbs

Wellington Diamond	3–3	Waterside

Wellington Diamond	2 – 0 (replay)	Waterside

Gore Wanderers	4–3	Queens Park (Invercargill)

Invercargill Thistle	6–1	Invercargill United

Mount Wellington	8–1	Grey Lynn

Nelson Rangers	4–3	Nelson Thistle

Nelson Suburbs	3–2	Motueka

Nelson Suburbs	4 – 2 (replayed)	Motueka

Wellington Northern	5–0	Hungaria

Northern Hearts (Timaru)	4–3	South Canterbury Thistle

Otangarei United (Whangarei)	1–7	Kahukura (Rotorua)

Palmerston North Thistle	4–5	Napier Rovers

Pukekohe Ramblers	1–3	Eastern Union

Saint Kilda	1–0	Otago University

Wanganui United	1–3	Waitara

Oamaru had a bye to the last 16

=== Fifth round ===
Christchurch City	19–1	Northern Hearts (Timaru)

Wellington Diamond	4–0	Wellington Northern

Eastern Suburbs	8–2	Kahukura

Eastern Union	2–0	Mount Wellington (Auckland)

Invercargill Thistle	4–3	Gore Wanderers

Nelson Rangers	3–1	Nelson Suburbs

Saint Kilda (Dunedin)	8–0	Oamaru

Waitara	0–2	Napier Rovers

=== Quarter-finals ===
Christchurch City	7–0	Nelson Rangers

Eastern Suburbs	6–1	Eastern Union

Invercargill Thistle	1–3	Saint Kilda

Wellington Diamond	3–1	Napier Rovers

=== Semi-finals ===
Eastern Suburbs	4–2	Wellington Diamond

Saint Kilda	1–0	Christchurch City

=== Final ===
4 September 1965

Eastern Suburbs	4–1	Saint Kilda
T. Pugh 2, Legg 2		Slinn

Basin Reserve, Wellington
Referee: R.W. Cullen
