= 2023 Chatham Cup =

Tournament details
- Country: New Zealand
- Dates: 22 April 2023 – 10 September 2023
- Teams: 130

Final positions
- Champions: Christchurch United
- Runners-up: Melville United

The 2023 Chatham Cup is New Zealand's 95th annual knockout football competition. This season the Chatham Cup celebrates 100 years since its inaugural edition.

It will have a preliminary round and four rounds proper before quarter-finals, semi-finals, and a final.

== Results ==
=== Preliminary round ===
Matches were played over the Anzac weekend of 22–25 April. This round contained five teams from the Auckland Sunday football leagues — AFC Bohemian Celtic, Colo Boys, Rapa Nui, Sperm Whales FC, and University of Auckland FC — which were the lowest-ranked teams in the competition.

Northern Region

22 April 2023	Bucklands Beach (4)	8–0	Warkworth (10)	Pakuranga Heights
14:00	Thompson 14', 26'; White 15' (o.g.); Waterland 18'; Jones 59', 77'; Hodgson 65' (o.g.); MacKenzie 66'	Report	Paul (yellow card) 79'	Stadium: Lloyd Elsmore Park; Referee: Wilhelmus Duncker

22 April 2023	Glen Eden United	1–5	Colo Boys (SUN)	Massey
14:00	West 19'; Santos (yellow card) 50'	Report	Smith 5'; O'toole 14'; Weedon 47', 90'; Barker (yellow card) 67'; D'souza 87'	Stadium: Royal Reserve; Referee: Scott Moffat

22 April 2023	South Auckland Rangers (5)	4–0	Ngongotaha (4)	Ormiston
14:00	C. Reddy (yellow card) 9'; Anderson 29'; Doli 55'; Khan 62'; Opperman 78'	Report	Waller (yellow card) 67'; Te Kiri (yellow card) 84'; Esendam (yellow card) 86'	Stadium: Rongomai Park; Referee: Ronald van Zuilen

22 April 2023	Te Puke United (6)	5–1	University of Auckland (SUN)	Te Puke
14:00	N. Johnson 12', 90+2'; F. McDonough 26'; J. McDonough 38'; Kennedy 55'	Report	Olsen 18'; Unkovich (yellow card) 47'	Stadium: Litt Park; Referee: Mark Orchard

22 April 2023	Pukekohe (9)	1–2	Waipuna (8)	Pukekohe
14:00	Taylor 67'; Rist (yellow card) 70'	Report	Pronk 3'; Cataldo born 15'; Gwanpua (yellow card) 79'	Stadium: Bledisloe Park; Referee: John Keen

22 April 2023	Cambridge (4)	4–2	Sperm Whales (SUN)	Cambridge
14:00	Carmichael 31'; Singh 33'; A. Taylor 48'; Clarkin 65'	Report	Mair 20', 50'; East (yellow card) 85'	Stadium: John Kerkhof Park; Referee: Zhijun Chen

22 April 2023	Matamata Swifts (5)	0–2	Papatoetoe (5)	Matamata
14:30	J. Harris (yellow card) 78'	Report	Prasad 6'; Karimo 57'	Stadium: Matamata Domain; Referee: Brendon Coker

22 April 2023	Plains Rangers (7)	0–2	Taupo (4)	Edgecumbe
14:30	E. Wetting (yellow card) 23'	Report	Lewis 58'; Giddy 80'	Stadium: Edgecumbe Domain; Referee: Stuart Blake

22 April 2023	Uni-Mount Bohemian (5)	2–1	FC Whangarei (6)	Auckland
16:00	Jonuzi 39'; Saraj 61'	Report	Carter 6'	Stadium: Bill McKinlay Park; Referee: Carl Te Wharau

25 April 2023	Papakura City (5)	3–2	Gisborne Thistle (3)	Papakura
13:00	Krishna 8'; Dixon 50', (yellow card) 70'; Mackay (yellow card) 65'; Morling 90' (pen.)	Report	McMillan (yellow card) 26'; Somerton 49'; Ure 69'; Patterson (yellow card) 89'	Stadium: McLennan Park; Referee: Clint van Eyssen

25 April 2023	Te Atatu (5)	13–0	Mangere United (8)	Te Atatu Peninsula
14:00	Caples 6', 16' (pen.), 55', 84'; Han 21', 47'; Mason 32'; Norris 35'; Bowman 44'; Willetts 59', 65', 69' (pen.), 86'	Report	S. Rahiman (yellow card) 69'	Stadium: Te Atatu Peninsula Park; Referee: Nick Waldron

25 April 2023	Central United (4)	2–8	Waitemata (4)	Auckland
14:00	Pank 57', 85'	Report	Kochasira 1', 3', 45'; Darrah 26'; Tanner 36' (pen.), 48', 51'; Sellar (yellow card) 58' (yellow-red card) 58'; Stevenson 90+2'	Stadium: Kiwitea Street; Referee: Campbell-Kirk Kawana-Waugh

25 April 2023	AFC Bohemian Celtic (SUN)	2–1	Otorohanga (5)	Auckland
14:00	Ramos 53'; O'Sullivan 55'; Haley 66'; Edwards (yellow card) 72'; Gibbons (yellow card) 86'	Report	Anglesey 90+3'	Stadium: Michaels Avenue Reserve; Referee: Roger Williams

25 April 2023	Papamoa (4)	2–3 (a.e.t.)	Northern United (6)	Papamoa Beach
14:00	Kenny 27'; Potts (yellow card) 43'; Jentzsch (yellow card) 57'; Kilpatrick (yellow card) 65' (goal) 93'; Irvine (yellow card) 71' (yellow-red card) 75'; Nelson (yellow card) 103' (yellow-red card) 103'; Hinz (yellow card) 117'	Report	Sullivan (yellow card) 18' (yellow-red card) 75'; Murray 66'; Kennedy 99', 109'; Eito (yellow card) 105'	Stadium: Gordon Spratt Reserve; Referee: Mark Orchard

25 April 2023	Rapa Nui (SUN)	3–1	West Hamilton United (5)	Māngere East
14:00	Nunez 33'; Puga (yellow card) 38'; Reyes Perez 50'; Valdes esquivel (yellow card) 83'; Ortega briones 90+1'	Report	J. Reed (yellow card) 21'; Mohmand 88' (yellow card) 90+2'	Stadium: Walter Massey Park; Referee: Lee Juno

Central Region

22 April 2023	Peringa United (4)	3–4	New Plymouth Boys' High School (4)	New Plymouth
14:00	Manning 12'; Jones (yellow card) 51'; Powell-Cullingford (yellow card) 72' (yellow-red card) 88'; Gally 74'; Clarke (yellow card) 75'; Smith 88'	Report	Dellow 23'; Kleinsorge 45'; Stott (yellow card) 61'; Andrews 87'; Young 89'	Stadium: Peringa Park; Referee: Craig Laird

22 April 2023	New Plymouth Rangers (4)	3–4	FC Western (4)	New Plymouth
14:00	N.Leggett 6', (yellow card) 81'; Pittams 34'; Stratton (yellow card) 69'; Brown 75'; Collier (yellow card) 90'	Report	Sheridan 35'; Oliver-Rose 48', 77'; Furze 51'	Stadium: Merrilands Domain; Referee: Ian Robinson

Capital Region

25 April 2023	Lower Hutt City (3)	4–0	Brooklyn Northern United (4)	Lower Hutt
14:00	Braakhuis 47'; Heredia Santamaria (yellow card) 60'; Zitye 75'; Rioga 89' (pen.); Murphy 90+4'	Report	Allen (yellow card) 62'; Roberts (yellow card) 66' (yellow-red card) 83'; Irving (yellow card) 68'; Sperring (yellow card) 81'; Robinson (yellow card) 83'	Stadium: Fraser Park; Referee: Alexander Dahlberg

25 April 2023	Kapiti Coast United (8)	1–0	Greytown (6)	Paraparaumu
14:00	De vries 8'; McFarlane (yellow card) 52'; Newman (yellow card) 77'	Report	Finlay (yellow card) 79'; Newton (yellow card) 87'	Stadium: Weka Park; Referee: Darren Reynolds
Note: Horowhenua Coastal FC (who compete in 4th tier, Capital 1) had to compete as Kapiti Coast United due to not being federated with New Zealand Football in time.

25 April 2023	Victoria University (4)	1–2	Wainuiomata (3)	Wellington
14:00	B. Wilson (yellow card) 47'; Stenner-Corbishley 53'	Report	Hinton 45+2'; Martin 79'	Stadium: Boyd Wilson Field; Referee: Jordan Williams

25 April 2023	Wellington United (6)	4–5	Seatoun (3)	Newtown
14:00	Redstall 62'; Patterson 68'; Brown (yellow card) 76'; Waller 83'; Watson 90+3'	Report	Daly 25', 72'; Kiloni 45+1'; Clayton 55'; Hey (yellow card) 73' (goal) 77'	Stadium: Te Whaea Artificial; Referee: Paul Rushworth

25 April 2023	Upper Hutt City (3)	11–2	Stokes Valley (5)	Upper Hutt
14:00	M. Fong 5', 22', 31', 34'; Kempt 42'; McIndoe 52'; Gahan 60', 86', 88'; J. Fong 65'; Hansen 88'	Report	Thomas 16'; West 59'	Stadium: Maidstone Park; Referee: Peter Linney

25 April 2023	Island Bay United (3)	6–1	Wellington Marist (5)	Wellington
14:00	Guthrie 23', 45+1'; Mitchener 32'; McPhee (yellow card) 36' (goal) 67'; Rodger 52', 82'; Hibron (yellow card) 84'; Bell (yellow card) 86'	Report	Greig 9'; Peattie (yellow card) 22'; Lyttle (yellow card) 84'	Stadium: Wakefield Park; Referee: Nigel Piper

25 April 2023	Paekākāriki (8)	3–2	Naenae (6)	Paekākāriki
14:00	Northcott 6'; Corry 23' (yellow card) 65'; Frost (yellow card) 67'; Provan monk 71'; Cutting (yellow card) 90+7'	Report	Pearce 75'; Lamont 90+1'	Stadium: Campbell Park; Referee: Jason Andrews

Nelson / Marlborough Bays Region

22 April 2023	Central Buccaneers (5)	6–0	Wakefield (6)	Marlborough
15:00	25' (o.g.); Masters 32'; Shallrass 36', 79'; Scammell (yellow card) 45+1'; Hall (yellow card) 54' (goal) 60'; Collingwood 68'	Report		Stadium: A&P Showgrounds; Referee: Morgan Breuer

25 April 2023	FC Nelson (5)	5–2	Golden Bay (6)	Nelson
14:30		Report		Stadium: Guppy Park; Referee: Iain Mac Fadyen

Canterbury Region

22 April 2023	Western (3)	4–5 (a.e.t.)	Parklands United (3)	Christchurch
14:30	Parry-Griffiths 7' (o.g.); Bradford 42', 120'; Ross 49'; Eady (yellow card) 109'	Report	Gruschow 14', 33'; Robson (yellow card) 20'; Adcock 45'; Norris 95'; Ruwhiu 105'; Newton (yellow card) 120'	Stadium: Walter Park; Referee: Thomas Lawson

22 April 2023	St Albans Shirley (6)	1–6	Waimakariri United (4)	Christchurch
14:30	Krijnen (yellow card) 15'; Beresford 36'; Villarroya Forts (yellow card) 84'	Report	Fraser 41'; Elmohib 50'; Lay (yellow card) 63', (goal) 68', 80', 85'; Sharp 90+4'	Stadium: St Albans Park; Referee: Paul Pace

Southern Region

22 April 2023	Gore Wanderers (4)	1–3	Grants Braes (4)	Gore
15:00	Patrick 56'; Peters (red card) 74'; Koning (red card) 88'	Report	Sayidov 26'; Hanrahan 36'; Adye 40'	Stadium: Hyde Park; Referee: Bruce Ryder

=== Round 1 ===
Matches were played over the weekend of 13–14 May. This round contained three teams from the Auckland Sunday football leagues — AFC Bohemian Celtic, Colo Boys, and Rapa Nui — which are the lowest-ranked teams left in the competition.

Northern Region

13 May 2023	Northern Rovers (3)	11–0	Colo Boys (SUN)	North Shore
14:00	Kinghorn 4', 29', 37', 45+1', 57', 72'; Turner 35', 66'; N. Edwards 38'; Windelburn 55', 86'	Report		Stadium: McFetridge Park; Referee: Pranil Gordhan

13 May 2023	Otumoetai (4)	4–2	Uni-Mount Bohemian AFC (5)	Tauranga
14:00	C. Picton 11', 54'; A. Picton 28'; Smyth (yellow card) 71'; Singh 72'	Report	Foley 22'; Jakoubek (yellow card) 71', (goal) 84' (pen.)	Stadium: Fergusson Park; Referee: Andrew Mitchell

13 May 2023	South Auckland Rangers (5)	3–2	Oratia United (4)	Ormiston
14:00	Anderson (yellow card) 56'; Minto 64', 66'; Kivolyn 72'; Khan (yellow card) 88'; Opperman (yellow card) 90+3'	Report	Withers 23', 75' (pen.)	Stadium: Rongomai Park; Referee: Kristian Klette

13 May 2023	East Coast Bays (3)	13–1	Rapa Nui (SUN)	North Shore
14:00	Garcia 4', 6', 55'; Coe 9', 35'; Berry 24', 27'; Archer 43'; T. Kim 63'; Noel 81', 86'; Stansfield 89', 90+1'	Report	Williamson Vargas 16'; Fuenzalida Levill (yellow card) 25'; Nazeem (yellow card) 29'; Valdes Esquivel (yellow card) 38'; Villegas (yellow card) 60'; Pando Romero (yellow card) 88'	Stadium: Bay City Park; Referee: Martin Huang

13 May 2023	Mt Albert Ponsonby (3)	1–3	Ngaruawahia United (3)	Auckland
14:00	Holland (yellow card) 6'; Gurney (yellow card) 41' (yellow-red card) 80'; Foster (yellow card) 55'; Rollinson 69'	Report	Henderson 2'; Kovacic 28', 30'; Bilen (yellow card) 32'; Nahna (yellow card) 77'; Campbell (yellow card) 90'; Mcmillan (yellow card) 90+3'	Stadium: Anderson Park; Referee: Jack Henderson

13 May 2023	Beachlands Maraetai (4)	0–1	Albany United (4)	Beachlands
14:00	Sharma (yellow card) 49'	Report	Beguely 75'	Stadium: Te Puru Park; Referee: Avi Narayan

13 May 2023	Royal New Zealand Navy (9)	0–8	Fencibles United (3)	Auckland
14:00	Brown (yellow card) 32'; McInnes (yellow card) 44'	Report	Garofalakis 7', 33'; Priestley 37' (pen.); Alfayad 41'; Clarke 70', 74', 87'; Lonergan 82'	Stadium: North Harbour Stadium Turf; Referee: Johnathon Smith

13 May 2023	Bucklands Beach (4)	9–0	Waipuna (8)	Bucklands Beach
14:00	Jones 6'; Waterland 11', 24', 35'; Latimer 24'; Bohea 47', 64'; Martin 76'; Burgoyne 77'	Report		Stadium: Lloyd Elsmore Park; Referee: Alec Couchman

13 May 2023	Cambridge (4)	1–3	Franklin United (4)	Cambridge
14:00		Report		Stadium: John Kerkhof Park

13 May 2023	Ellerslie (3)	5–1	Northland FC (4)	Ellerslie
14:00		Report		Stadium: Michaels Avenue Reserve

13 May 2023	West Auckland (4)	w/o	Papakura City (5)	Auckland
14:00	di Palma (yellow card) 22'; M. Hearn 74', (yellow card) 90'; R. Wilcox 90+4'; Riddoch (yellow card) 97'	Report	Sivan 12'; Krishna (yellow card) 17'; Kumar (yellow card) 40', (goal) 58'; Edwards (yellow card) 69'	Stadium: Brains Park; Referee: Dan Tyler
	Penalties
	J. Hearn (penalty scored); Saeed (penalty missed); Peden (penalty scored); M. Hearn (penalty scored); R. Wilcox (penalty scored); Azimi (penalty scored); Riddoch (penalty scored); C. Wilcox (penalty scored); Gates (penalty scored); F. Kolomatangi (penalty missed)		(penalty scored) Allan; (penalty scored) Sivan; (penalty scored) Krishna; (penalty scored) Akhlaqi; (penalty missed) Shankaran; (penalty scored) Mika; (penalty scored) Robb; (penalty scored) Darby; (penalty scored) Edwards; (penalty scored) Thammavongsar
Note: Papakura originally won 9–8 on penalties after a 2–2 draw, but were disqualified after fielding an ineligible player.

13 May 2023	Papatoetoe (5)	1–5	Waikato Unicol (4)	Papatoetoe
14:00	Nissan 43'	Report	Hanif 41' (o.g.); Ali (yellow card) 48'; Kamaldeen 65'; McFarlane 72'; Clark 84'; Poudyal 87'	Stadium: Murdoch Park

13 May 2023	Hibiscus Coast (3)	2–3	Waitemata (4)	Whangaparaoa
14:00	Mayes 36', (yellow card) 49'; Martin 43'	Report	Dormer (yellow card) 62', (goal) 70'; Tanner 84'; Davies 88'	Stadium: Stanmore Bay Park

13 May 2023	North Shore United (3)	3–0	Te Atatu (5)	North Shore
14:00	Anderson 45'; Hiscotte (yellow card) 49'; Taylor 89'; Hicks 90+4' (pen.)	Report	Mulrooney (yellow card) 56'; Johnston (yellow card) 77'	Stadium: Allen Hill Stadium

13 May 2023	Te Awamutu (4)	4–3	Taupo (4)	Te Awamutu
14:00	Skipps 16', (yellow card) 60'; Coster 83'; Glenister 87' (pen.); J. Roil 90+5'	Report	Foster 25'; Lewis 32', (yellow card) 56'; Giddy (yellow card) 43'; Tillessen 90'	Stadium: The Stadium

13 May 2023	Claudelands Rovers (4)	4–1	Te Puke United (6)	Hamilton
14:00	Christensen-Rose 9', 41', (yellow card) 37'; Finlay 54'; Stephen 81'	Report	K. McDonough (yellow card) 29'; Bell 50'; A. Skerton (red card) 86'	Stadium: Galloway Park

13 May 2023	Northern United (6)	1–3	Metro (3)	Hamilton
17:30	Sullivan 51'	Report	Souza 49'; Cain 57'; Smith 75'	Stadium: Korikori Park

14 May 2023	Bohemian Celtic (SUN)	0–9	Tauranga City (3)	Ellerslie
14:00		Report	Molloy 2', 19'; Brennan 45'; Reid 51'; Bidois 53', 87'; Wellsbury 76'; Ramos 85'; Bryant 90' (pen.)	Stadium: Michaels Avenue Reserve

Central Region

13 May 2023	Massey University (6)	1–3	Napier Marist (4)	Palmerston North
14:00	Smither 85', (yellow card) 90+6'	Report	Can 56', 90'; Moffitt 65'; Durrington (yellow card) 84'; MacKirdy (yellow card) 90+1'	Stadium: Memorial Park

13 May 2023	New Plymouth Boys' High School (4)	2–1	Moturoa (4)	New Plymouth
14:00	Hearn-powers 30'; Du 72'	Report	Matheson (yellow card) 66'; Wilson 85' (pen.)	Stadium: Webster Field

13 May 2023	FC Western (4)	2–0	Palmerston North Marist (3)	New Plymouth
14:00	Fettis (yellow card) 32'; Connor-Rose (yellow card) 36'; Furze 42' (pen.); Phillips 58'	Report	Boag (yellow card) 41' (yellow-red card) 45'; Charlton (yellow card) 85'	Stadium: Lynmouth Park

Capital Region

13 May 2023	Kapiti Coast United (8)	3–0	Lower Hutt City (3)	Kāpiti
14:00	Newman 14', (yellow card) 30'; Harmer 33'; Bertham (yellow card) 70'; Hughes 90'	Report		Stadium: Weka Park
Note: Horowhenua Coastal FC (who compete in 4th tier, Capital 1) had to compete as Kapiti Coast United due to not being federated with New Zealand Football in time.

13 May 2023	Paekākāriki (8)	0–10	Island Bay United (3)	Paekākāriki
14:00		Report	Mitchener 12', 39', 51', 62', 63'; Bell 18', 40', 80'; Lenihan-Geels 43'; Peden 82'	Stadium: Campbell Park

13 May 2023	Upper Hutt City (3)	1–3	Tawa (3)	Upper Hutt
14:00	Marshall 28'; Postlethwaite (yellow card) 45+2'; Patterson (yellow card) 45+2'; Fong (yellow card) 62'; Kempt (yellow card) 64'; Maxwell (yellow card) 75'	Report	Scott 10'; Jackson 14'; Staunton 35'; D'Mello (yellow card) 70'; McFayden (yellow card) 82'	Stadium: Maidstone Park

14 May 2023	Wainuiomata (3)	3–1	Seatoun (3)	Lower Hutt
14:00	King 4' (pen.), 90+9' (pen.); Attewell 38'	Report	Daly 41'; Parry (yellow card) 61'	Stadium: Richard Prouse Park

Nelson / Marlborough Bays Region

13 May 2023	Motueka (5)	2–1	FC Nelson (5)	Motueka
14:00	Lattimer 31'; Kerry 39'; Searle (yellow card) 59'	Report	Hansen 12'; Scott (yellow card) 38'	Stadium: Memorial Park

14 May 2023	Central Buccaneers (5)	0–10	Nelson Suburbs (2)	Marlborough
14:00	Segovia (yellow card) 66'	Report	Whewell 3', 16', 43', 69'; Ridsdale 27'; Hickman 31'; Turner 82'; Gil Gomez 85'; Larsen 88' (pen.), 90+2'	Stadium: A&P Showgrounds

Canterbury Region

12 May 2023	Christchurch United (1)	9–0	Parklands United (3)	Christchurch
19:00	MacLennan 17'; Stokes 25', 35'; Debenham 56'; Parker 57' (o.g.); Cole 66'; Meyn 80'; Philip 90', 90+2'	Report		Stadium: Christchurch Football Centre; Referee: Aaron Nottage

13 May 2023	Cashmere Technical (1)	1–0	Selwyn United (2)	Christchurch
14:00	Lapslie (yellow card) 32'; Storer 45'; Tongue (yellow card) 53'	Report	McKay (yellow card) 16'	Stadium: Garrick Memorial Park; Referee: Hayden McCable

13 May 2023	Nomads United (2)	1–2	Ferrymead Bays (2)	Christchurch
14:00	MacLeod-Watts 32'; Holdem (yellow card) 52'; Campbell (yellow card) 90+1'	Report	Lapslie (yellow card) 15'; Meaclem (yellow card) 59'; Julve 65' (pen.); Hayashi 80'; White (yellow card) 90+2'	Stadium: Tulett Park; Referee: Michael Love

13 May 2023	Halswell United (3)	1–2	FC Twenty 11 (2)	Christchurch
14:00	Williams (yellow card) 36', (goal) 73'; Navickas (yellow card) 57'; Price (yellow card) 85'	Report	Dix 14'; Fairley 66'; Oakman (yellow card) 88'	Stadium: Halswell Domain; Referee: Iain Marshall

13 May 2023	Universities (3)	3–2	Waimakariri United (3)	Christchurch
15:00	Campbell 20'; Peacocke 24', (yellow card) 83'; Whitwell 90'	Report	Fraser 37', (yellow card) 57'; Quigley (yellow card) 66'; Vialoux (yellow card) 70'; Hosseiny 78'	Stadium: English Park; Referee: Caleb Downes

14 May 2023	Coastal Spirit (2)	5–1	Burwood (3)	Christchurch
12:00	McGarr 32'; Cameron 60', 79'; Braithwaite 61' (o.g.); Smoothy 67'	Report	Zimmerman 3'; Brown (yellow card) 45'; Thomas (yellow card) 68'	Stadium: Linfield Park

Southern Region

13 May 2023	Thistle FC (4)	4–1	Grants Braes (4)	Invercargill
14:00	McLaren 15', (yellow card) 65'; Raza 17'; Cairns 65', 73'	Report	Adye 43'	Stadium: ILT Football Turf; Referee: Will Dymond

13 May 2023	Queenstown (3)	1–3	Wanaka (3)	Queenstown
14:00		Report		Stadium: John Davies Oval

13 May 2023	Mosgiel (3)	7–2	Northern Hearts (3)	Mosgiel
14:00	Quarrell 15', 35', 59', 62', (yellow card) 64'; Findlay 26'; Clissold 56'; Duncan 57'	Report	Chambers 53'; Hayes (yellow card) 59'; Nelson (yellow card) 65'; Bagrie 83'	Stadium: Memorial Park; Referee: Wayne Van Gorp

13 May 2023	Northern (3)	1–2	Roslyn-Wakari (3)	Dunedin
14:45	Al Mawal 70'	Report	Wilkie (yellow card) 51', (goal) 51'; Madden 63'; Lucas (yellow card) 72'; Baird-Hodge (yellow card) 81'; Thom (yellow card) 90+1'	Stadium: Logan Park; Referee: Craig Smart

=== Round 2 ===
Matches were played over the weekend of 3–5 June. This round contained one team from level 8, Kapiti Coast United, the lowest-ranked team left in the competition. (Note: Horowhenua Coastal FC (who compete in 4th tier, Capital 1) had to compete as Kapiti Coast United due to not being federated with New Zealand Football in time.)

Northern Region

3 June 2023	Onehunga Mangere United (3)	4–0	Te Awamutu (4)	Māngere
14:00	Lewis (yellow card) 32'; Soffe 47'; Manko 80'; Aurelio Lapetina de Oliveira Dias 90', 90+4'		Foulkes (yellow card) 87'	Stadium: Māngere Domain

3 June 2023	Northern Rovers (3)	0–1	Fencibles United (3)	North Shore
14:00	Harbottle (yellow card) 80'; Friday (yellow card) 90'		Moosbally (yellow card) 70'; Hong (yellow card) 73'; Nicol (yellow card) 77'; Garofalakis (yellow card) 80'	Stadium: McFetridge Park

3 June 2023	South Auckland Rangers (5)	2–1	North Shore United (3)	Manukau
14:00	Streamer 34' (o.g.); Atiq 75'; Navaba (yellow card) 80'; Reddy (yellow card) 90+2'		Petherick 29'	Stadium: Rongomai Park

5 June 2023	Ngaruawahia United (3)	6–4 (a.e.t.)	Albany United (4)	Ngāruawāhia
12:30	Nkoy 13'; Kovacic 45+1', 56' (pen.); Brown 63'; Baird 105+1' (o.g.); Memedovic 109'		So (yellow card) 13'; Laulhe Centurion 19'; Davey 20'; Beguely 77'; Landeg 90+4'	Stadium: Centennial Park

5 June 2023	Claudelands Rovers (4)	2–4	Bucklands Beach (4)	Hamilton
13:00	Matiwane 8'; Shannon Forrester (yellow card) 67'; Venema 77'		Latimer 12', 83'; Smith 49'; Waterland 56'	Stadium: Galloway Park

5 June 2023	Auckland United (1)	0–2	Auckland City (1)	Auckland
14:00	Stephen (yellow card) 24'; Waite (yellow card) 66'		Ilich (yellow card) 45'; Gillion 56'; de Vries 88'	Stadium: Keith Hay Park

5 June 2023	Otumoetai (4)	1–7	Melville United (2)	Tauranga
14:00	Boland (yellow card) 30'; McLean (yellow card) 65'; Panzer 70' (o.g.)		England 18', 32'; Hayes 21' (yellow card) 62'; Scott (yellow card) 21' (goal) 39'; Connor 36'; Lagos (red card) 60'; Panzer 61'; Richards 90'	Stadium: Fergusson Park

5 June 2023	Birkenhead United (2)	5–1	Waiheke United (3)	North Shore
14:00	Jorgensen 8' (pen.), 83' (pen.); Botica 32'; Carlson-du Toit 50', 90'; Connor-McClean (yellow card) 78'		Herrera 2'; Vanina (yellow card) 45+3'; Mena (yellow card) 64'; Amad (red card) 65'; Canay (yellow card) 70'; Ciganda (yellow card) 82'; Parentella (yellow card) 90+2'	Stadium: McFetridge Park

5 June 2023	Takapuna (2)	2–0	Waikato Unicol (4)	North Shore
14:00	Pinas 10'; Smith (yellow card) 26'; Wilcox 58' (yellow card) 65'			Stadium: Taharoto Park

5 June 2023	Bay Olympic (2)	0–1	West Coast Rangers (2)	Auckland
14:00			Hodgson (yellow card) 21'; Pearce 53' (pen.); Alama (yellow card) 59'	Stadium: Olympic Park

5 June 2023	Franklin United (4)	2–1	Waitemata (4)	Drury
14:00	Day 49'; Richardson 73'		Tanner 69'; Sellar (yellow card) 83'	Stadium: Drury Sportsgrounds

5 June 2023	Manurewa (1)	0–1	Eastern Suburbs (1)	Auckland
14:00	Patterson (yellow card) 34'; Probert (yellow card) 67'; Khan (yellow card) 90+6'		Bueno (yellow card) 75'; Mechell 86'; Knowles (yellow card) 90+4'	Stadium: War Memorial Park

5 June 2023	Metro (3)	0–2	West Auckland (4)	Auckland
14:00	Souza (yellow card) 37'; Furmenger (yellow card) 57'; Kelly (yellow card) 80'; Probert (yellow card) 90+5'		West 18'; Koloamatangi (yellow card) 36'; Maisey 47' (o.g.)	Stadium: Phyllis Street Reserve

5 June 2023	East Coast Bays (3)	1–2	Western Springs (2)	North Shore
14:00	Andersen (yellow card) 55'; Stansfield 64'; Stevenson (yellow card) 67'; Kim (yellow card) 90+2'		Steinmetz (yellow card) 21'; Margetts 59'; Browne 74'	Stadium: Bay City Park

5 June 2023	Hamilton Wanderers (2)	4–1	Ellerslie (3)	Hamilton
14:00	Hurd 19', 48'; Pratt 37'; Lamb 45+1'; Grunwald (yellow card) 50'		Oosterhof 10'	Stadium: Porritt Stadium

10 June 2023	Tauranga City (3)	6–0	Manukau United (2)	Mount Maunganui
14:00	Bidois 26', 28', 31'; Brennan 38', 64'; Davidson 83' (pen.)	Report		Stadium: Links Avenue Reserve; Referee: Riley Greenbury
Note: Postponed from original date of 5 June due to unplayable conditions.

Central Region

3 June 2023	Wellington Olympic (1)	9–3	Wainuiomata (3)	Wellington
14:00	Gould 12', 48'; Bouzoukis 19', 24', 28'; Mitrakas (yellow card) 26' (goal) 73'; Luke-Miny 29', 70'; Thurston 46'		Attewell 8'; Ashforth (yellow card) 27'; Williams (yellow card) 52'; King 68'; Argaez Benítez 71'	Stadium: Wakefield Park

3 June 2023	Miramar Rangers (2)	4–4 (a.e.t.) (3–4 p)	Stop Out (2)	Wellington
14:00	R. Manuel 19'; Wood (yellow card) 45+2' (yellow-red card) 70'; Falconer (yellow card) 75'; Bevin 85', 104'; Simes 90+6'; T. Manuel (yellow card) 119'		Jelley (yellow card) 26'; Prins 35', 99' (yellow card) 114'; Craven 68'; Jelley 87'; Gaul (yellow card) 90+3' (yellow-red card) 90+3'; Cosgrave (yellow card) 92'	Stadium: David Farrington Park

3 June 2023	Napier Marist (4)	0–1	North Wellington (2)	Napier
14:00			Nazari 69'	Stadium: Bond Field

3 June 2023	New Plymouth Boys' High School (4)	1–4	FC Western (4)	New Plymouth
14:00	Hearn-Powers 90+2'		Gibson 36' (pen.); Roberts 44'; Oliver-Rose 69'; Burnell 90+3'	Stadium: Webster Field

3 June 2023	Tawa (3)	0–2	Waterside Karori (2)	Wellington
14:00	McFayden (yellow card) 48'; D'Mello (yellow card) 80'		Cordwell 45+1' (yellow card) 82'; Lane-Turnbull (yellow card) 49'; Parker 72'; Chrétien (yellow card) 78'; Alvarado (yellow card) 85'	Stadium: Redwood Park

3 June 2023	Petone (1)	2–1	Whanganui Athletic (2)	Lower Hutt
14:30	McMinn 51'; Sinclair (yellow card) 80'; Pickering 90+4'		Farmer 39'	Stadium: Memorial Park

4 June 2023	Napier City Rovers (1)	4–2	Island Bay United (3)	Napier
14:00	Corfe 26' (pen.), 90'; Hoyle (yellow card) 43'; Atkins (yellow card) 57'; Lack 60'; Karajovanovic 79'		Mitchener 45' (pen.), 78'; Stant (yellow card) 54' (yellow-red card) 74'; Sutton (yellow card) 68'	Stadium: Bluewater Stadium

5 June 2023	Kapiti Coast United (8)	0–4	Western Suburbs (2)	Kāpiti
14:00	McFarlane (yellow card) 20'; Bertham (yellow card) 61'; Hibberd (yellow card) 75'	Report	Abrahaberhe 20', 25'; Delaney 31'; Scott 35'	Stadium: Weka Park
Note: Horowhenua Coastal FC (who compete in 4th tier, Capital 1) had to compete as Kapiti Coast United due to not being federated with New Zealand Football in time.

Mainland Region

2 June 2023	Motueka (5)	0–9	Nelson Suburbs (2)	Motueka
19:00	Torres Rivero (yellow card) 19'; Kerry (yellow card) 45'; Searle (yellow card) 86'	Report	Gillespie 1', 5', 12', 25', 73', 78', 90'; Searle 39' (o.g.); Ward 50'	Stadium: Memorial Park; Referee: Maurice John Llewellin

2 June 2023	Ferrymead Bays (2)	2–1	FC Twenty 11 (2)	Christchurch
19:15	Turipa (yellow card) 24'; Williams (yellow card) 69'; Thoms 85', 90+7'; Murphy (yellow card) 90+6'	Report	Foissy (yellow card) 24', (goal) 28' (pen.); Bennett (yellow card) 72'; Kelly (yellow card) 84'; Rowe (yellow card); Oakman (yellow card)	Stadium: Ferrymead Park; Referee: Richard Jones

3 June 2023	Coastal Spirit (2)	2–4	Cashmere Technical (1)	Christchurch
14:00	Nicol (yellow card) 32' (yellow-red card) 36'; McGarr (yellow card) 36'; Mitchell 41', (yellow card) 75'; Pitts (yellow card) 75'; Hoole (yellow card) 81'	Report	Barbour-Rayan 5'; Coughlan 21', 90+3'; Kane (yellow card) 53'; Storer 60'	Stadium: Linfield Park; Referee: Ralph Clink

5 June 2023	Universities (3)	1–3	Christchurch United (1)	Christchurch
14:00	Brooks 81'	Report	Stokes 44'; Tod-Smith 57'; Godden 87'	Stadium: Christchurch Football Centre; Referee: Aaron Nottage

Southern Region

3 June 2023	Queens Park (3)	0–1	Green Island (2)	Invercargill
13:00	Johnson (yellow card) 45+2'	Report	Milidrag 40'	Stadium: Surrey Park; Referee: Gary Boyles

3 June 2023	Wanaka (3)	1–0	Dunedin City Royals (2)	Wānaka
14:00	Brady 45+2'; Grehan (yellow card) 76'	Report		Stadium: Wānaka Recreation Centre; Referee: Lindsey Robinson

3 June 2023	Mosgiel (3)	0–4	Otago University (3)	Mosgiel
14:00	Walecki (yellow card) 44'; Quarrell (yellow card) 75'	Report	Thompson 8'; Reynolds 32'; Quinn 34'; Julian 44'; Willett (yellow card) 79'	Stadium: Memorial Park; Referee: Andrew Kennedy

3 June 2023	Thistle FC (4)	0–5	Roslyn-Wakari (3)	Invercargill
14:00	Honre (yellow card) 36'; Mohammed (yellow card) 61'	Report	Cosgrove 35'; Treadwell 40'; Lucas 73'; Wilkie 75'; Madden 81'	Stadium: ILT Football Turf; Referee: Craig Campbell

=== Round 3 ===
Matches were played over the weekend of 17–18 June. This round contains one team from level 5, South Auckland Rangers, the lowest-ranked team left in the competition.

Northern Region

17 June 2023	Onehunga Mangere United (3)	1–4	Ngaruawahia United (3)	Māngere
14:00	Manko 32'	Report	Kovacic 27', 50', 81'; Henderson 39' (pen.); Brown (yellow card) 53'; Vhavha (yellow card) 76'; Nkoy (yellow card) 88'	Stadium: Māngere Domain

17 June 2023	Birkenhead United (2)	3–1 (a.e.t.)	Franklin United (4)	North Shore
14:00	Morgan 80'; Carlson-du Toit 92'; Toy 117'	Report	Chand 2'	Stadium: Shepherds Park

17 June 2023	West Coast Rangers (2)	0–4	Hamilton Wanderers (2)	Huapai
14:00	Turner (yellow card) 3'; Kay (red card) 36'; Millar (yellow card) 46'; Foulds (yellow card) 71'	Report	Rose 37' (pen.); Tieku 40'; Lamb 55'; Bayliss 63'	Stadium: Huapai Reserve

17 June 2023	Auckland City (1)	9–0	Bucklands Beach (4)	Auckland
14:00	de Vries 3', 27', 45'; Gillion 12'; Kilkolly (yellow card) 57', (goal) 78'; Howieson 64'; Lee 74'; Mitchell 78'; Gray 90+2'	Report	MacKenzie (yellow card) 57'	Stadium: Kiwitea Street

17 June 2023	South Auckland Rangers (5)	0–4	Western Springs (2)	Manukau
14:00	Opperman (yellow card) 41'	Report	Kelly 30'; Ramsay 45+3' (pen.); Steinmetz 47'; McIntyre 90'	Stadium: Rongomai Park

17 June 2023	Fencibles United (3)	4–1	West Auckland (4)	Auckland
14:00	Moosbally 33'; Garofalakis (yellow card) 36'; Lonergan 64'; Bulay 89'; Nicol 90+1'	Report	Haj (yellow card) 32'; M. Hearn (yellow card) 35'; J. Hearn 41' (pen.); Wilcox (yellow card) 72'	Stadium: Riverhills Park

17 June 2023	Takapuna (2)	0–1	Melville United (2)	North Shore
14:00	Wilcox (yellow card) 69'; Allport (yellow card) 90+4'	Report	Gleissner-Broom 4' (o.g.); Liddicoat (yellow card) 23'; Kipara (yellow card) 37'; Thompson (yellow card) 82'; Richards (red card) 87'	Stadium: Taharoto Park

24 June 2023	Tauranga City (3)	0–2	Eastern Suburbs (1)	Mount Maunganui
14:00	O'Donoghue (yellow card) 50'; Molloy (yellow card) 62'; Brennan (yellow card) 90+4'	Report	Toomey (yellow card) 62', (goal) 87'; Bueno 67' (pen.)	Stadium: Links Avenue Reserve
Note: Due to poor weather conditions the match was moved from Links Avenue Reserve to Gordon Spratt Reserve before heavy rain forced the game to be postponed.

Central Region

17 June 2023	Petone (1)	3–0	FC Western (4)	Lower Hutt
14:00	Brazier 16'; Sinclair 30' (pen.); Pickering 85'; Snell (yellow card) 89'	Report		Stadium: Petone Memorial Park

17 June 2023	Wellington Olympic (1)	3–2	North Wellington (2)	Wellington
14:00	Mata 12' (pen.), 78' (pen.); Davenport Petersen (yellow card) 73'; Bouzoukis (yellow card) 80'; Watson 82'; Sinclair (yellow card) 87'	Report	Wardlaw 24' (yellow card) 70'; Bruce (yellow card) 25' (goal) 32'; Keetley (yellow card) 38'; Zatorski (yellow card) 48'; Macgregor (yellow card) 76'	Stadium: Wakefield Park

17 June 2023	Waterside Karori (2)	1–0 (a.e.t.)	Western Suburbs (2)	Wellington
14:00	Taye (yellow card) 33'; Fautley (yellow card) 45+1'; Alvarado (yellow card) 73'; Cordwell (yellow card) 90+1'; Forrest 110'	Report	Rogerson (yellow card) 48'; van Rijssel (yellow card) 105+1'; Penney (yellow card) 120+2'	Stadium: Karori Park

18 June 2023	Napier City Rovers (1)	8–2	Stop Out (2)	Napier
14:00	McNamara 4' (yellow card) 25'; Emerson 21', 30'; Corfe 22', 53'; Karajovanovic (yellow card) 29' (goal) 64'; Hoyle (yellow card) 56'; Mason 90'	Report	Moore 18'; Palezevic (yellow card) 30'; Tuck 45+2'; Cosgrave (yellow card) 76' (yellow-red card) 78'	Stadium: Bluewater Stadium

Southern Region

16 June 2023	Ferrymead Bays (2)	0–1 (a.e.t.)	Christchurch United (1)	Christchurch
19:30	Hayashi (yellow card) 19'; Thoms (yellow card) 51'; Barr (yellow card) 66' (yellow-red card) 95'; Boys (yellow card) 104'; Julve (yellow card) 110' (yellow-red card) 114'	Report	Todd-Smith (yellow card) 29', (goal) 96'; Peterson (yellow card) 60'; Grover (yellow card) 71'; Lapslie (yellow card) 105'; King (red card) 118'	Stadium: Ferrymead Park; Referee: Caleb Downes

17 June 2023	Wanaka (3)	0–0 (a.e.t.) (3–2 p)	Green Island (2)	Wānaka
14:00	Sprowson (yellow card) 22'; Fletcher (yellow card) 80'; Wilson (yellow card) 118'	Report	Milidrag (yellow card) 67'; Hewson (yellow card) 73'; Wall (yellow card) 114'	Stadium: Wānaka Recreation Centre; Referee: Lindsey Robinson
	Penalties
	Brum (penalty missed); Grehan (penalty scored); Lang (penalty scored); Bradly (penalty scored)		Myers (penalty scored); Wall (penalty scored); Kotkamp (penalty missed); Bell (penalty missed); Hewson (penalty missed)

17 June 2023	Roslyn-Wakari (3)	1–0	Otago University (3)	Dunedin
14:00	Cosgrove 89'	Report		Stadium: Ellis Park; Referee: Caleb Marsh

18 June 2023	Nelson Suburbs (2)	0–1	Cashmere Technical (1)	Nelson
14:00	Ayers (yellow card) 29'; Yong (yellow card) 39'	Report	Edwards (yellow card) 18'; Coughlan (yellow card) 78', (goal) 81'	Stadium: Saxton Fields; Referee: Michael Killick

=== Round 4 ===
Matches were played over the weekend of 8–9 July. This round contains four teams from level 3, Fencibles United, Ngaruawahia United, Roslyn-Wakari, and Wanaka, the lowest-ranked teams left in the competition.

Northern Region

8 July 2023	Western Springs (2)	3–2 (a.e.t.)	Auckland City (1)	Auckland
14:00	Kelly 18', 81'; Nakashima 94'	Report	de Vries 14'; Howieson 62'; Murati (yellow card) 68'; Ilich (yellow card) 70'; Gray (yellow card) 90'	Stadium: Seddon Fields; Referee: Ashley Wilson

8 July 2023	Fencibles United (3)	0–2	Melville United (2)	Pakuranga
18:30	Alfayad (yellow card) 65'; Dsouza (yellow card) 79'; Moosbally (red card) 90+6'	Report	Oakman (yellow card) 18'; Bates 24'; Panzer (yellow card) 45+4' (goal) 67'; McLeod (yellow card) 82'	Stadium: William Green Domain; Referee: Nick Waldron

9 July 2023	Birkenhead United (2)	1–2	Eastern Suburbs (1)	North Shore
14:00	Jorgensen (yellow card) 44' (red card); Botica 54'; Toy (yellow card) 77'	Report	de Vries 20' (pen.), 56'; Jeremiah (yellow card) 46'; Doyle-Lissette (yellow card) 52'	Stadium: Allen Hill Stadium; Referee: Riley Greenbury

9 July 2023	Hamilton Wanderers (2)	2–2 (a.e.t.) (7–6 p)	Ngaruawahia United (3)	Cambridge
14:00	Mitchell 10'; Khatkar (yellow card) 42'; Pratt (yellow card) 82' (goal) 83'; Rose (yellow card) 120+1'	Report	Perez 37' (yellow card) 115'; Kovacic 56'; Memedovic (yellow card) 87'; Darkwa (yellow card) 96'; Fletcher (yellow card) 110'	Stadium: John Kerkhof Park; Referee: Benjamin Norman
	Penalties
	Tieku (penalty missed); Bayliss (penalty scored); Pratt (penalty scored); Aramberry Patti (penalty scored); Rose (penalty scored); Hurd (penalty scored); Khatkar (penalty scored); Ferrer Sendra (penalty scored)		(penalty missed) Kovacic; (penalty scored) Marden; (penalty scored) Memedovic; (penalty scored) Pringle; (penalty scored) Nahna; (penalty scored) Martin; (penalty scored) Fletcher; (penalty missed) Ngungambili

Central Region

8 July 2023	Petone (1)	0–5	Wellington Olympic (1)	Lower Hutt
15:00	Brazier (yellow card) 72'; Khaled (yellow card) 90+3'	Report	Stevens 16'; Bouzoukis (yellow card) 16' (goal) 25', 41'; Mata 22', 61'	Stadium: Petone Memorial Park; Referee: Peter Linney

9 July 2023	Napier City Rovers (1)	0–3	Waterside Karori (2)	Napier
14:00	Hoyle (yellow card) 60'; Karajovanovic (yellow card) 80'; Mason (yellow card) 81'	Report	Fautley (yellow card) 40'; Alvarado 43', 78' (yellow card) 55'; Cordwell 65'; Lack (yellow card) 80'	Stadium: Bluewater Stadium; Referee: Russell Jones

Southern Region

8 July 2023	Roslyn-Wakari (3)	4–3	Wanaka (3)	Dunedin
14:00	Smith 9'; Wilkie 43', 48'; Cosgrove (yellow card) 45'; Baird-Hodge (yellow card) 47'; Treadwell 49'; Lucas (red card) 63'; Johnston (yellow card) 78'; Stevens (yellow card) 90+3'	Report	Wilson (yellow card) 10'; Treadwell 14' (o.g.); Brum (yellow card) 20'; Scoullar 28'; Thompson (yellow card) 89'; Wright 90+3'; Dickson (yellow card) 90+6'	Stadium: Ellis Park; Referee: Bruce James

9 July 2023	Cashmere Technical (1)	0–3	Christchurch United (1)	Christchurch
14:00	Kane (yellow card) 38'; Schwarz (yellow card) 90+2'	Report	Grover (yellow card) 14'; Peterson 56'; Lapslie (yellow card) 61'; Stokes (yellow card) 71'; Khalifa (yellow card) 75'; MacLennan 77' (yellow card) 90+5'; O'Driscoll 87'	Stadium: English Park; Referee: Caleb Downes

=== Quarter-finals ===
The quarter-finals were played on 29 July 2023. This round contains one team from level 5, Roslyn-Wakari, the lowest-ranked team left in the competition.

29 July 2022	Roslyn-Wakari (3)	2–5	Waterside Karori (2)	Dunedin
14:00	Wilkie (yellow card) 15'; Treadwell 20'; Gray 78' (yellow card) 84'		Lack 27'; Diamond (yellow card) 40'; Taye 55'; Parker 77', 90+3'; Ward 86'	Stadium: Ellis Park

29 July 2022	Hamilton Wanderers (2)	0–3	Christchurch United (1)	Cambridge
14:00	Ferrer Sendra (yellow card) 58'		MacLennan 20'; Philip 59'; Lindsay (yellow card) 68'; Godden 73'; Murphy (yellow card) 90+3'	Stadium: John Kerkohf Park

29 July 2022	Wellington Olympic (1)	2–3 (a.e.t.)	Eastern Suburbs (1)	Wellington
14:00	Watson (yellow card) 10'; Mata 30' (pen.), 38' (pen.); Davenport Petersen (yellow card) 83'; Gulley (red card) 87'; Dimairo (yellow card) 108'; Stevens (yellow card) 118'; Cawley (yellow card) 120+4'		Verney 7' (yellow card) 55'; de Vries 16', 118' (yellow card) 112'; Twigg (yellow card) 25'; Thomas (yellow card) 29'; Jeremiah (yellow card) 54'	Stadium: Wakefield Park

29 July 2022	Melville United (2)	1–0	Western Springs (2)	Hamilton
17:30	Hayes (yellow card) 45'; Lagos 50'; Liddicoat (yellow card) 58'; Thompson (yellow card) 80'		Drake (yellow card) 28'; Tobin (yellow card) 34'; Gatkek (yellow card) 45'; Ramsay (yellow card) 51'; Thomas (yellow card) 90+4'	Stadium: Gower Park

=== Semi-finals ===
The quarter-finals were played on 19 August 2023. This round featured four teams from the National League regional leagues (level 2) including one competing in the Championship phase (level 1).

19 August 2023	Christchurch United (1)	2–1	Eastern Suburbs (1)	Christchurch
14:00	Tod-Smith 13' (yellow card) 81'; Philip 24'; Lapslie (yellow card) 65'; Lindsay (yellow card) 67'; MacLennan (yellow card) 78'; Morris (yellow card) 90+6'		Kalua (yellow card) 53'; Doyle-Lissette (yellow card) 75'; O'Driscoll 82' (o.g.)	Stadium: Christchurch Football Centre; Attendance: 620

19 August 2023	Melville United (2)	3–1	Waterside Karori (2)	Hamilton
17:30	Dale (yellow card) 48'; Lagos 64', 82' (yellow card) 64'; Hayes (yellow card) 69'; McGovern 70' (yellow card) 85'		Villa 5'; Diamond (yellow card) 61'; Knott (yellow card) 89'	Stadium: Gower Park

=== Final ===
The final was played on the 10 September 2023. The game features two teams from the National League regional leagues (level 2) including one competing in the Championship phase (level 1).

10 September 2023
16:00

Melville United (2)	2–2 (a.e.t.)	Christchurch United (1)
Lim 72'; Tommy 90+8'	Report	Lim 11' (o.g.); Brown 36' (o.g.)
Penalties
McGovern (penalty missed); Hayes (penalty scored); McLeod (penalty scored); England (penalty missed)	2–4	(penalty scored) Stokes; (penalty scored) Lapslie; (penalty missed) Stearn; (penalty scored) Lindsay; (penalty scored) Tod-Smith

North Harbour Stadium, Auckland
Referee: Nick Waldron

== Notes ==
The tiers that teams are in (as indicated in brackets next to their name) are based on the New Zealand football league system for the 2023 season. As some teams can qualify and play in more than one league (and tier) per season, the highest tier that they take part in is the one noted next to their name.
