= 1964 Chatham Cup =

Tournament details
- Venue(s): Basin Reserve, Wellington
- Dates: 2 May – 5 September 1964

Final positions
- Champions: Mount Roskill (1st title)
- Runners-up: King Edward Technical College Old Boys

The 1964 Chatham Cup was the 37th annual nationwide knockout football competition in New Zealand.

The competition was run on a regional basis, with regional associations each holding separate qualifying rounds. As there were different numbers of rounds in each region, the round names given here are only approximate.

Other teams taking part in the final rounds are known to have included Napier Rovers.

== Highlights and lowlights ==
Noteworthy incidents which occurred during the 1964 Chatham Cup include a match between Kawerau and Whakatane Town, which was delayed for 20 minutes after a goal collapsed when Whakatane forward B. Good slid into the net while scoring his side's first goal. A match between Mount Roskill and Whangarei High School Old Boys was also delayed when a late switch of venue caused several Whangarei players to fail to arrive at the ground. The match was delayed before Whangarei finally took to the field with several reserve players.

=== Kotuku ===
Kotuku, one of the last sides to enter the Chatham Cup from the West Coast of New Zealand, were denied by the NZFA in 1964 as the team were determined to be a regional representative side, not a club team as the cup competition rules required.

== The 1964 final ==
The Mount had the perfect start to the final, with Geoff Cozens scoring in the second minute. Ray Darby doubled the lead halfway through the first half, and the Aucklanders went to the break 2–0 up. Darby made it three in the 73rd minute, and the 80th-minute strike from Tech's Bill Porteous was merely a consolation effort.

== Results ==
=== First round ===
2 May 1964

Claudelands Rovers	4 – 0	Hamilton B

2 May 1964

Hamilton	4 – 0	Otorohanga
Emmott ×2, Ironsides, Thornton

2 May 1964

Huntly Thistle	11 - 5	Matamata Swifts

Huntly Recreation Ground, Huntly
9 May 1964

North Shore United	3 – 1	Mount Albert
McNichol, Maynard, Paterson		Wheeler

Blandford Park, Auckland
9 May 1964

Mount Roskill	4 – 3	Mount Wellington
Cochran ×2, Blanchette, G. Cozens		Lamont ×3

Blandford Park, Auckland
2 May 1964

Tokoroa	7 – 0	Hamilton United

=== Second round ===
23 May 1964

Canterbury University	2 – 1 (aet)	Cashmere Wanderers
Lill, Whitehead		Totka

23 May 1964

Christchurch City	9 – 1	Riccarton
Madrussen ×3, Bruce ×2, Watson ×2, Zeilburger, Nuttridge		Crozier

13 June 1964

Dunedin HSOB	2 – 1	Green Island

23 May 1964

Grey Lynn	4 – 2	Eden (Auckland)
Dobric ×3, Bossan		Flatman ×2

13 June 1964

King Edward TCOB (Dunedin)	2 – 0	Saint Kilda

23 May 1964

Mount Roskill	5 – 2	Eastern Suburbs (Auckland)
Darby ×2, Leuschke, Cochran, Gilmour		Wrathall ×2

Blandford Park, Auckland
23 May 1964

Mount Wellington	4 – 3	Mount Albert
Houghton ×2, Lamont, Lyles		Thompson ×2, Dickens

23 May 1964

New Brighton	7 – 0	Waterside Canterbury (Christchurch)
Robinson ×3, Horne ×2, Proost, Moller

13 June 1964

Northern (Dunedin)	3 – 1	Caversham

23 May 1964

North Shore United	4 – 1	Metro (Auckland)
Maynard ×3, Patterson		Gager

13 June 1964

Roslyn-Wakari	4 – 2	Mosgiel

23 May 1964

Western (Christchurch)	3 – 2	Christchurch HSOB
Smith, Clements, Bishop		Thomas, Kay

- Claudelands Rovers beat either Tokoroa or Huntly
- Hamilton beat either Tokoroa or Huntly

=== Third round ===
30 May 1964

Canterbury University	0 – 3	Western
		Bussey, Clements, Torkington (pen.)

Ilam Road, Christchurch
Referee: W. Higgins
30 May 1964

Christchurch City	6 – 1	Christchurch Technical
Bruce ×3, Madrussen, Westwood, Nuttridge		Dent

Linwood Park, Christchurch
Referee: P. Donnelly
6 June 1964

Claudelands Rovers	3 – 2	Hamilton
McNeil, Wheallans, Daly		Dekkers, Emmott

13 June 1964

Eastern Union (Gisborne)	5 – 0	Riverina (Wairoa)
Mulrooney ×3, Jones ×2

9 May 1964

Invercargill Thistle	6 – 0	Queens Park (Invercargill)
Steele ×2, Dick, Patterson, ?, ?

16 May 1964

Kawerau	3 – 7	Whakatane Town

Kawerau
20 June 1964

King Edward TCOB	3 – 1	Dunedin HSOB
Connor, Parata, Brown		Smith (og)

Caledonian Ground, South Dunedin
Referee: A. Williams
6 June 1964

Moturoa	2 – 1	New Plymouth OB
J. Marshall, K. McDonald		W. Iveson

Western Park, New Plymouth
13 June 1964

Mount Roskill	3 – 0	Grey Lynn
G. Cozens, Blanchette, Darby

30 May 1964

Nomads (Christchurch)	6 – 2	New Brighton
Muirson ×4, McLean, Martin		Horne, Smythe

English Park, Christchurch
Referee: R. W. Cullen
13 June 1964

North Shore United	1 – 0	Blockhouse Bay
Russell

20 June 1964

Roslyn-Wakari	2 – 3	Northern
Rennie, Loan		Berry ×3

Caledonian Ground, South Dunedin
Referee: R. McDonald
30 May 1964

Shamrock (Christchurch)	4 – 2	Christchurch Rangers
Killick ×2, Hinchley, Yates		Taylor, Ansell

English Park, Christchurch
Referee: W.M. Littlewood

=== Fourth round ===
27 June 1964

Kahukura (Rotorua)	2 – 1	Claudelands Rovers
Nevison, Boyle		Ironside

Rotorua
23 May 1964

Invercargill Thistle	7 – 2	Old Boys (Invercargill)
Steele ×5, Paterson, ?		Baker, ?

27 June 1964

King Edward TCOB	1 – 0	Northern
Paul

Caledonian Ground, South Dunedin
Referee: A. Patton
13 June 1964

Moturoa	2 - 6 aet	Wanganui United
K. McDonald, J. Marshall		A. Smith (pen.), A. Cooney, W. Alding, J. Miller ×2, E. Toyne

Wembley Park, Wanganui
6 June 1964

Nomads	4 – 3	Christchurch City
McLean ×2, Martin, Muirson		Bruce ×2, Nuttridge

27 June 1964

North Shore United	4 – 1	Eastern Union
Paterson ×2, Cripsey, Middleton		Pugh

Newmarket Park, Auckland
13 June 1964

Palmerston North Thistle	6 – 3	Saint Andrews (Palmerston North)

27 June 1964

Papatoetoe	1 – 7	Mount Roskill
Bachelor		Cochrane ×3, G. Cozens ×2, Blanchette, A. Cozens

Papatoetoe, Auckland
23 May 1964

Waihopai	4 – 2	Invercargill United
Sinclair ×2, Healey, Duffy		Gauldie ×2

6 June 1964

Western	2 – 1	Shamrock
Clements, Treadwell		McParland

=== Fifth round ===
11 July 1964

King Edward TCOB	7 – 0	Oamaru
Porteous ×3, Paul ×2, Brown, Connor

Caledonian Ground, South Dunedin
Referee: A. Patton
11 July 1964

Mount Roskill	6 – 0	Whangarei HSOB
Blanchette ×3, Darby, Kemp, Leuschke

Mangere
Referee: J. Musto
13 June 1964

Nomads	3 – 2 (aet)	Western
Muirson ×2, Martin		Smith, Bussey

Referee: R.W. Cullen
11 July 1964

North Shore United	7 – 1	Kahukura
Paterson ×5, Russell, Cripsey		Theunnissen

Newmarket Park, Auckland
6 June 1964

Waihopai (Invercargill)	1 – 0	Invercargill Thistle
? (og)

Surrey Park, Invercargill
Referee: T. Griggs

=== Quarter-finals ("Zone finals") ===
25 July 1964

King Edward TCOB	9 – 2	Waihopai
Paul ×3, Connor 3 (1 pen.), Porteous ×2, Smith (pen.)		Muir 2 (2 pen.)

Caledonian Ground, South Dunedin
Referee: J. Sharman
25 July 1964

Mount Roskill	3 – 2 (aet)	North Shore United
Darby ×2, Squires		Paterson, Maynard

18 July 1964

Nelson Rangers	3 – 2 (aet)	Nomads
Clinton, Thomas, McBride		Muirson ×2

Nelson
Referee: J. Nicol
25 July 1964

Palmerston North Thistle	6 - 0	Miramar Rangers
R. Armitage ×3, A. Griffin ×2, J. Finnegan	Report

Sportsground, Palmerston North

=== Semi-finals ("Island finals") ===
8 August 1964

Mount Roskill	3 – 1 (aet)	Palmerston North Thistle
Lesuschke, Orrell, Blanchette		Armitage

Newmarket Park, Auckland
15 August 1964

Nelson Rangers	1 – 4	King Edward TCOB
?		Paul ×2, Parata, Porteous

Trafalgar Park, Nelson
Referee: C. Anderson

=== Final ===
5 September 1964

Mount Roskill	3 – 1	King Edward TCOB
G. Cozens, Darby ×2		Porteous

Basin Reserve, Wellington
Referee: T.J. Ward
