= 1966 Chatham Cup =

Tournament details
- Venue(s): Basin Reserve, Wellington
- Dates: 3 September 1966

Final positions
- Champions: Miramar Rangers (1st title)
- Runners-up: Western

The 1966 Chatham Cup was the 39th annual nationwide knockout football competition in New Zealand.

The competition was run on a regional basis, with 17 regional associations holding separate qualification rounds. The winners of each of these qualification tournaments, along with the second-placed team from Auckland, qualified for the competition proper. In all, 91 teams took part in the competition, 32 from the South Island and 59 from the North Island. Note: Different sources record different numbers for the rounds of this competition, with some confusion caused by differing numbers of rounds in regional qualification.

== The 1966 final ==
The final was the first since 1962 to feature no Auckland teams. Rangers had the stronger of the two finalist sides, with strong players such as goalkeeper Peter Whiting and brothers Les and Barry Taylor. In a gritty but largely uninspiring final, Western had most of the play, coming close to scoring on several occasions, with one goal disallowed and another shot hitting the woodwork. As the game progressed Rangers came into their own, taking the lead through a Les Taylor shot which hit the upright before ricocheting into the net. The ball had been the result of a parried clearance by Western keeper David Smith of a Stef Billing header.

== Results ==
=== Third round ===
Christchurch City	5 – 0	Rangers (Christchurch)

Eastern Suburbs (Auckland)	3 – 2	East Coast Bays

Eastern Union (Gisborne)	2 – 0	Riverina (Wairoa)

Hamilton	5 – 3	Claudelands Rovers

Kahukura (Rotorua)	4 – 0	Rotorua Rangers

King Edward TCOB (Dunedin)	2 – 0	Otago University

Maori Hill (Dunedin)	2 – 0	Caversham

Miramar Rangers	1 – 0	Karori Swifts

Moturoa	6 – 0	New Plymouth United

Mount Wellington	1 – 0	Mount Roskill

Napier Rovers	4 – 2	Napier HSOB

Nelson Rangers	5 – 1	Nelson Thistle

New Brighton	5 – 1	Christchurch Technical

Northern (Dunedin)	3 – 0	Roslyn-Wakari

Wellington Northern	4 – 3	Stop Out (Lower Hutt)

Otangarei United (Whangarei)	3 – 2	Kamo Swifts

Papatoetoe	3 – 1	Pukekohe Ramblers

Ponsonby	6 – 2	North Shore United

Richmond Athletic	2 – 1	Nelson Suburbs

Saint Kilda	4 – 2	Mosgiel

Seatoun	1 – 0	Waterside (Wellington)

Wanganui East Athletic	0 – 0 (aet)*	Palmerston North Thistle

Waterside Canterbury	2 – 1	Christchurch HSOB

Wellington United	4 – 1	Wainuiomata

Western (Christchurch)	12 – 2	Northern Hearts (Timaru)

*match won by Wanganui East on corners

=== Fourth round ===
Blenheim Athletic	5 – 2	Grosvenor Rovers

Christchurch City	2 – 0	New Brighton

Eastern Suburbs (Auckland)	7 – 1	Kahukura (Rotorua)

Hamilton	2 – 1	Eastern Union (Gisborne)

Invercargill Thistle	7 – 3	Gore Wanderers

Miramar Rangers	2 – 0	Wellington Northern

Moturoa	5 – 2	Masterton Athletic

Nelson Rangers	6 – 1	Richmond Athletic

Northern	3 – 1	Maori Hill

Otangarei United (Whangarei)	1 – 2	Papatoetoe

Ponsonby	2 – 1	Mount Wellington

Queens Park	2 – 1	Invercargill United

Saint Kilda	3 – 1	King Edward TCOB

Seatoun	5 – 1	Wellington United

Wanganui East Athletic	2 – 5	Napier Rovers

Western	9 – 0	Waterside Canterbury

=== Fifth round ===
Blenheim Athletic	0 – 9	Nelson Rangers

Invercargill Thistle	4 – 2	Queens Park

Miramar Rangers	3 – 1	Seatoun

Moturoa	4 – 2	Napier Rovers

Papatoetoe	1 – 4	Eastern Suburbs

Ponsonby	4 – 1	Hamilton

Saint Kilda	3 – 1	Northern

Western	2 – 1	Christchurch City

=== Quarter-finals ===
Moturoa	0 – 3	Miramar Rangers

Nelson Rangers	0 – 2	Western (Christchurch)

Ponsonby	2 – 1	Eastern Suburbs

Saint Kilda	4 – 1	Invercargill Thistle

=== Semi-finals ===
Ponsonby	1 – 2	Miramar Rangers

Western	1 – 1 (aet)	Saint Kilda

==== Replay ====
Saint Kilda	1 – 3	Western

=== Final ===
3 September 1966

Miramar Rangers	1 – 0	Western
L. Taylor

Basin Reserve, Wellington
Referee: Les Coffman
