= 1988 Chatham Cup =

Tournament details
- Venue(s): first leg: Queen Elizabeth II Park, Christchurch second leg: Muir Park, Hamilton
- Dates: first leg: 22 October 1988 second leg: 24 October 1988

Final positions
- Champions: Waikato United (1st title)
- Runners-up: Christchurch United

Awards
- Jack Batty Memorial Cup: Steve Tate, Waikato United

The 1988 Chatham Cup was the 61st annual nationwide knockout football competition in New Zealand.

Up to the last 16 of the competition, the cup was run in three regions (northern, central, and southern). National League teams received a bye until the final 64 stage. In all, 147 teams took part in the competition, a new record for the time.

== The 1988 final ==
The final was the third and last to be held over home and away legs. The format was abandoned for the 1989 Chatham Cup as it proved unpopular. The 1988 final was the only one to be decided on the away goals rule, with Waikato United winning after scoring more goals in the first leg in Christchurch, despite both matches ending in draws.

The Christchurch team included Steve Sumner, returning to the city after a spell with Gisborne, and playing for the team he had played against in the 1987 final.

The first leg was held in Christchurch. Waikato took the lead through Steve Tate, and Lance Bauerfeind doubled their advantage. Christchurch scored twice in the last 20 minutes through John Hanson and Johan Verweij.

The two goals scored by Waikato in the first match were to prove invaluable. The second tie, in Hamilton, was evenly balanced. Waikato's Steve Tate again opened the scoring, with a goal after 17 minutes. The away goals rule meant that Christchurch would then need two goals — a 1–1 draw would not be enough. They received only one goal, via a Keith Braithwaite penalty a quarter of an hour before the final whistle.

The Jack Batty Memorial Trophy for player of the final was awarded to double goalscorer Steve Tate of Waikato United.

== Results ==
=== Third round ===
Cashmere Wanderers	0 – 4	Burndale United (Christchurch)

Central (Auckland)	3 – 1	Tokoroa

Christchurch HSOB	2 – 1	Riccarton

Christchurch Technical	2 – 1	Halswell United

Dunedin City	1 – 5	Mosgiel

Havelock North Wanderers	2 – 5	Gisborne City

Huntly Thistle	0 – 1	Mount Albert-Ponsonby

Hutt Valley United	1 – 3	Wellington Olympic

Lynndale (Auckland)	0 – 1	Mount Roskill

Miramar Rangers	6 – 1	Wanganui East Athletic

Mount Maunganui	0 – 1	North Shore United

Mount Wellington	2 – 1	Ellerslie

Napier City Rovers	5 – 0	Red Sox (Palmerston North)

New Plymouth Old Boys	4 – 0	New Plymouth City

New Brighton	0 – 6	Christchurch United

Old Boys (Invercargill)	3 – 3 (aet)*	Queens Park (Invercargill)

Oratia United	2 – 3	Manurewa

Papatoetoe	0 – 3	Blockhouse Bay

Petone	1 – 4	Porirua Viard United

Roslyn-Wakari	1 – 2	North End United (Dunedin)

Rotorua Suburbs	0 – 4	Metro (Auckland)

South Auckland Rangers	2 – 2 (aet)*	Ngaruawahia United

Stokes Valley	2 – 1	North Wellington

Taradale	2 – 0	Moturoa

Taupo	2 – 1	Waikato Unicol

Tawa	0 – 3	Lower Hutt City

Victoria University	2 – 1	Palmerston North End

Waikato United	6 – 0	Clendon United

Wainuiomata	2 – 3	Manawatu

Wellington United	3 – 1	Waterside

West Auckland	3 – 0	Manukau City

Woolston WMC	5 – 1	Saint Albans-Shirley

* won on penalties by Queens Park (5–4) and South Auckland (4–3)

=== Fourth round ===
Blockhouse Bay	3 – 0	Metro

Burndale United	3 – 0	Queens Park

Christchurch HSOB	1 – 2	North End United

Manawatu	2 – 3	Gisborne City

Mosgiel	0 – 1	Christchurch United

Mount Albert-Ponsonby	2 – 0	Taupo

Mount Wellington	3 – 1	Mount Roskill

Napier City Rovers	3 – 1	Porirua Viard United

Nelson United	1 – 4	Wellington United

New Plymouth Old Boys	3 – 1	Wellington Olympic

North Shore United	1 – 3	West Auckland

South Auckland Rangers	0 – 2	Manurewa

Stokes Valley	3 – 2	Miramar Rangers

Taradale	2 – 1	Victoria University

Waikato United	3 – 0	Central

Woolston WMC	2 – 5	Christchurch Technical

=== Fifth round ===
Blockhouse Bay	1 – 0	West Auckland

Burndale United (Christchurch)	3 – 2	North End United (Dunedin)

Christchurch Technical	1 – 9	Christchurch United

Gisborne City	2 – 0	Stokes Valley

Mount Wellington	4 –1	Mount Albert-Ponsonby

New Plymouth Old Boys	1 – 0	Taradale

Waikato United (Hamilton)	3 – 1	Manurewa

Wellington United	3 – 2	Napier City Rovers

=== Sixth Round ===
Blockhouse Bay	2 – 0	Mount Wellington

Burndale United	0 – 2	Waikato United

Christchurch United	4 – 3	Gisborne City

Wellington United	5 – 1	New Plymouth Old Boys

=== Semi-finals ===
Christchurch United	2 – 1	Blockhouse Bay

Wellington United	0 – 0 (aet)*	Waikato United

* won on penalties by Waikato United (3–0)

=== Final ===
22 October 1988

Christchurch United	2 – 2	Waikato United
Hanson, Verweij		Tate, Bauerfeind

Queen Elizabeth II Park, Christchurch
Referee: R. Brown
24 October 1988

Waikato United	1 – 1	Christchurch United
Tate		Braithwaite (pen.)

Muir Park, Hamilton
Referee: R. Brown

Aggregate score 3–3. Waikato United won on away goals.
