= 1967 Chatham Cup =

Tournament details
- Venue(s): Basin Reserve, Wellington
- Dates: 2 September 1967

Final positions
- Champions: North Shore United (4th title)
- Runners-up: Christchurch City

The 1967 Chatham Cup was the 40th annual nationwide knockout football competition in New Zealand.

The competition was run on a regional basis, with 17 regional associations holding separate qualification rounds. The winners of each of these qualification tournaments, along with the second-placed team from Auckland, qualified for the competition proper. In all, 95 teams took part in the competition, 32 from the South Island and 63 from the North Island. Note: Different sources record different numbers for the rounds of this competition, with some confusion caused by differing numbers of rounds in regional qualification.

== The 1967 final ==
North Shore United returned to the final, this time with former international Ken Armstrong as coach. In the final they met Christchurch City - soon to change its name to Christchurch United, a recently amalgamated team featuring players who had previously been with several strong southern sides, among them future internationals Terry Haydon and Tony Gowans. The game was an exciting one. The Christchurch side dominated for the entire first half, but a combination of missed chances, the woodwork, a disallowed goal, and heroics from Shore keeper Dennis Mack kept the first half scoreless. In the second spell, Billy Rimmer scored for the Aucklanders early but the lead was soon cancelled out by a strike from Haydon. A late penalty for City was missed by Gowans, and Shore made the most of their chance by stealing a late winner through Ian Campbell.

== Results ==
=== Third round ===
Blockhouse Bay	3 – 0	Lynndale (Auckland)

Christchurch City	2 – 0	Christchurch Technical

Dunedin HSOB	3 – 0	Caversham

Eastern Union (Gisborne)	3 – 2	Riverina (Wairoa)

Hamilton	5 – 1	Claudelands Rovers

Hungaria (Wellington)	3 – 0	Johnson Villa (Wellington)

Maori Hill (Dunedin)	2 – 1	Saint Kilda

Miramar Rangers	2 – 1	Stop Out (Lower Hutt)

Napier Rovers	6 – 2	Moturoa

Nelson Thistle	2 – 2*	Nelson Suburbs

New Brighton	4 – 0	Christchurch HSOB

Northern (Dunedin)	5 – 2	Mosgiel

North Shore United	1 – 1†	Mount Wellington

Palmerston North Thistle	3 – 1	Kiwi United

Petone	3 – 3¶	Western Suburbs FC (Wellington)

Papatoetoe	6 – 1	Massey Rovers

Queens Park (Invercargill)	6 – 0	Old Boys (Invercargill)

Richmond Athletic	1 – 0	Nelson Rangers

Roslyn-Wakari	2 – 1	Otago University

Shirley-Nomads	2 – 1	Rangers (Christchurch)

Waterside (Wellington)	5 – 2	Lower Hutt City

Western (Christchurch)	7 – 0	Christchurch Celtic

Western Suburbs FC (Wellington)	4 – 2	Wanganui East Athletic

* Won by Suburbs on toss of coin
† Won by North Shore on corners
¶ Won by Western Suburbs on corners

=== Fourth round ===
Christchurch City	7 – 2	Shirley-Nomads

Dunedin HSOB	1 – 0	Maori Hill

Eastern Union (Gisborne)	3 – 1	Blockhouse Bay

Gore Wanderers	2 – 1	Queens Park

Invercargill Thistle	3 – 2	Invercargill United

Miramar Rangers	3 – 1	Hungaria

Nelson Suburbs	1 – 0	Richmond Athletic

New Brighton	2 – 0	Western

Northern	4 – 0	Roslyn-Wakari

North Shore United	2 – 1	Papatoetoe (soccer)

Palmerston North Thistle	2 – 1	Napier Rovers

Rotorua City	5 – 0	Hamilton

Waterside (Wellington)	3 – 0	Petone

Western Suburbs FC (Wellington)	12 – 1	Masterton Athletic

Whangarei	8 – 0	Kamo Swifts

=== Fifth round ===
Christchurch City	2 – 1	New Brighton

Eastern Union	2 – 0	Whangarei

Invercargill Thistle	9 – 0	Gore Wanderers

Miramar Rangers	1 – 0	Waterside (Wellington)

Nelson Suburbs	2 – 3 (aet)	Grosvenor Rovers (Marlborough)

Northern	1 – 0	Dunedin HSOB

North Shore United	3 – 2	Rotorua City

Palmerston North Thistle	5 – 0	Western Suburbs FC (Wellington)

=== Quarter-finals ===
Christchurch City	12 – 1	Grosvenor Rovers

Eastern Union	0 – 1 (aet)	North Shore United

Invercargill Thistle	3 – 2	Northern (Dunedin)

Miramar Rangers	2 – 1	Palmerston North Thistle

=== Semi-finals ===
Invercargill Thistle	1 – 4	Christchurch City

North Shore United	1 – 0 (aet)*	Miramar Rangers

* some sources give the result as 2–1 aet

=== Final ===
2 September 1967

North Shore United	2 – 1	Christchurch City
Rimmer, Campbell		Haydon

Basin Reserve, Wellington
Referee: D.W. Grant
