= 1968 Chatham Cup =

Tournament details
- Venue(s): Basin Reserve, Wellington
- Dates: 7 September 1968

Final positions
- Champions: Eastern Suburbs (4th title)
- Runners-up: Christchurch Technical

The 1968 Chatham Cup was the 41st annual nationwide knockout football competition in New Zealand.

Early stages of the competition were run on a regional basis. In all, 93 teams took part in the competition. Note: Different sources give different numberings for the rounds of the competition: some start round one with the beginning of the regional qualifications; others start numbering from the first national knock-out stage. The former numbering scheme is used in this article.

== The 1968 final ==
The final was a one-sided affair, with Suburbs proving too strong for the southerners. John Wrathall scored both goals in the final, putting the ball past Tech keeper (and future national team coach) Ian Marshall.

== Results ==
=== Third Round ===
Caversham	2 – 0	King Edward TCOB

Rangers (Christchurch)	3 – 2	Christchurch City

Christchurch Technical	3 – 2	New Brighton

Eastern Suburbs	2 – 2	Mount Wellington

Eastern Suburbs (Auckland)	5 – 2 (replay)	Mount Wellington

Ellerslie	5 – 0	Grey Lynn

Gisborne City	3 – 0	Riverina (Wairoa)

Hamilton	5 – 3	Claudelands Rovers

Miramar Rangers	6 – 1	Seatoun

Mosgiel	4 – 3	HSOB (Dunedin)

Moturoa	4 – 2	HSOB (New Plymouth)

Mount Albert	1 – 1*	Metro College

Naenae	5 – 4	Lower Hutt City

Nelson Suburbs	3 – 2	Nelson City

Nelson United	3 – 0	Richmond Athletic

Palmerston North Thistle	3 – 0	Kiwi United

Papatoetoe	2 – 1	Massey Rovers

Roslyn-Wakari	5 – 3	Northern (Dunedin)

Saint Kilda	4 – 0	Maori Hill (Dunedin)

Waterside (Wellington)	3 – 0	Stop Out (Lower Hutt)

Wanganui Western Suburbs	2 – 0	Wanganui East Athletic

Western Suburbs FC (Porirua)	3 – 1	Victoria University

Whangarei	6 – 0	Kamo Swifts

* Mount Albert won on corners

=== Fourth Round ===
Caversham	4 – 1	Mosgiel

Christchurch Technical	3 – 0	Rangers (Christchurch)

Gisborne City	1 – 2	Eastern Suburbs (Auckland)

Invercargill United	6 – 1	Gore Wanderers

Miramar Rangers	6 – 0	Naenae

Moturoa	2 – 4	Wanganui Western Suburbs

Mount Albert	2 – 1	Ellerslie

Nelson United	2 – 1	Nelson Suburbs

Palmerston North Thistle	6 – 1	Napier Rovers

Queens Park	4 – 2	Invercargill Thistle

Roslyn-Wakari	2 – 1	Saint Kilda

Rotorua City	1 – 3	Hamilton

Waterside (Wellington)	3 – 2	Western Suburbs FC (Porirua)

Whangarei	1 – 4	Papatoetoe

=== Fifth Round ===
Eastern Suburbs (Auckland)	4 – 1	Mount Albert

Grosvenor Rovers (Marlborough)	0 – 7	Nelson United

Invercargill United	2 – 1	Queens Park (Invercargill)

Miramar Rangers	2 – 1	Waterside (Wellington)

Palmerston North Thistle	3 – 1	Western Suburbs FC (Porirua)

Papatoetoe	0 – 4	Hamilton

Roslyn-Wakari	2 – 2 (aet)*	Caversham

Timaru City	0 – 2	Christchurch Technical

* Roslyn-Wakari won on corners

=== Quarter-finals ===
Hamilton	1 – 3	Eastern Suburbs

Nelson United	0 – 1	Christchurch Technical

Palmerston North Thistle	3 – 0	Miramar Rangers

Roslyn-Wakari	3 – 1	Invercargill United

=== Semi-finals ===
Christchurch Technical	3 – 0	Roslyn-Wakari

Eastern Suburbs	6 – 2	Palmerston North Thistle

=== Final ===
7 September 1968

Eastern Suburbs	2 – 0	Christchurch Technical
Wrathall ×2

Basin Reserve, Wellington
Referee: J.S. Nicol
