= 1969 Chatham Cup =

Tournament details
- Venue(s): Basin Reserve, Wellington
- Dates: 6 September 1969

Final positions
- Champions: Eastern Suburbs (5th title)
- Runners-up: New Brighton

The 1969 Chatham Cup was the 42nd annual nationwide knockout football competition in New Zealand.

Early stages of the competition were run on a regional basis. In all, 89 teams took part in the competition. Note: Different sources give different numberings for the rounds of the competition: some start round one with the beginning of the regional qualifications; others start numbering from the first national knock-out stage. The former numbering scheme is used in this article.

The announcement of the start of the New Zealand National Soccer League in 1970 led to changes in the organisation of the Chatham Cup, and this was the last year prior to the creation of a more open draw.

== The 1969 final ==
The last Chatham Cup to be decided on the old regional champions basis was 1969, and it again saw Eastern Suburbs reach the final, this time to face final debutants New Brighton. Despite the efforts of the southern defence, marshalled ably by keeper Derek Phillips, Suburbs had the better of the contest and scored two goals, one each from 1968 scorer John Wrathall and Billy de Graaf.

== Results ==
=== Third Round ===
Blockhouse Bay	8 – 3	Ponsonby

Canterbury University	4 – 1	Timaru City

Caversham	5 – 1	Maori Hill (Dunedin)

Christchurch City	3 – 2	Rangers (Christchurch)

Christchurch Technical	2 – 1	Western (Christchurch)

Eastern Suburbs (Auckland)	7 – 0	East Coast Bays

Hamilton	6 – 0	Huntly Thistle

Hungaria (Wellington)	4 – 3	Petone

King Edward TCOB (Dunedin)	4 – 4*	HSOB (Dunedin)

Massey Rovers	1 – 0	Manurewa

Masterton United	1 – 3	Palmerston City (Palmerston North)

Miramar Rangers	4 – 0	Wellington Northern

Moturoa	1 – 1*	New Plymouth Old Boys

Napier Rovers	3 – 0	Hastings Leopard

New Brighton	4 – 1	HSOB (Christchurch)

Northern (Dunedin)	3 – 1	Saint Kilda-Mornington

North Shore United	2 – 0	Mount Albert

Roslyn-Wakari	6 – 3	Mosgiel

Seatoun	2 – 0	Wellington Marist

Stop Out (Lower Hutt)	2 – 0	Lower Hutt City

Wanganui East Athletic	3 – 0	Marton Rovers

Whangarei	5 – 0	Cruising Club

*Won on corners by KETCOB and Moturoa

=== Fourth Round ===
Christchurch City	3 – 0	Christchurch Technical

Eastern Suburbs	8 – 0	Blockhouse Bays

Invercargill Thistle	1 – 0	Invercargill United

Massey Rovers	0 – 2	Hamilton

Miramar Rangers	3 – 1	Seatoun

Nelson City	4 – 3	Richmond Athletic

Nelson United	6 – 1	Nelson Suburbs

New Brighton	3 – 1	Canterbury University

Northern	3 – 2	King Edward TCOB

North Shore United	7 – 0	Rotorua City

Palmerston City	1 – 0	Napier Rovers

Queens Park (Invercargill)	4 – 2	Waihopai (Invercargill)

Roslyn-Wakari	3 – 3*	Caversham

Stop Out	2 – 1	Hungaria

Wanganui East Athletic	1 – 3	Moturoa

Whangarei	1 – 4	Gisborne City

*Won on corners by Roslyn-Wakari

=== Fifth Round ===
Hamilton	0 – 3	Eastern Suburbs (Auckland)

Invercargill Thistle	6 – 0	Queens Park (Invercargill)

Miramar Rangers	5 – 0	Stop Out (Lower Hutt)

Nelson United	2 – 1	Nelson City

New Brighton	3 – 2	Christchurch City

Northern (Dunedin)	5 – 0	Roslyn-Wakari

North Shore United	1 – 0	Gisborne City

Palmerston City (Palmerston North)	4 – 2	Moturoa

=== Quarter-finals ===
Invercargill Thistle	3 – 1	Northern

Miramar Rangers	3 – 1	Palmerston City

New Brighton	4 – 1	Nelson United

North Shore United	0 – 1	Eastern Suburbs

=== Semi-finals ===
Eastern Suburbs	5 – 2	Miramar Rangers

Invercargill Thistle	0 – 5	New Brighton

=== Final ===
6 September 1969

Eastern Suburbs	2 – 0	New Brighton
Wrathall, de Graaf

Basin Reserve, Wellington
Referee: T.G. Delahunty
