= 1973 Chatham Cup =

Tournament details
- Venue(s): Newmarket Park, Auckland
- Dates: 1 September 1973

Final positions
- Champions: Mount Wellington (1st title)
- Runners-up: North Shore United

The 1973 Chatham Cup was the 46th annual nationwide knockout football competition in New Zealand.

The organisation of the cup was changed from previous years, with early stages being run in three large zones (northern, central, and southern), rather than by individual associations as had previously been the case. National League teams received a bye until the later stages of the competition. In all, 103 teams took part in the competition. Note: Different sources give different numberings for the rounds of the competition: some start round one with the beginning of the regional qualifications; others start numbering from the first national knock-out stage. The former numbering scheme is used in this article.

== The 1973 final ==
The final was moved from the Basin Reserve for the first time since 1928, excluding replays. The 1973 final was - also excluding replays - the first to be held outside Wellington. Part of the reason for the move was because - for the first time ever - both finalists came from Auckland. This was only the second time (after 1971) that both finalists had come from the same urban area. The venue was to alternate between Auckland and Christchurch for several years from 1973.

Mount Wellington made up for their narrow loss in the marathon final of the 1972 Chatham Cup by inflicting a sound defeat on their neighbours from across the Waitematā Harbour. Coach Ken Armstrong added to his impressive tally of cup victories both on and off the field. Shore's cause was not helped when keeper Turner had to be substituted early on after an injury, but even without this handicap the Mount would have proven the stronger side. All the goals came from Mount Wellington's players, with two from Dave Taylor and one from John Houghton.

== Results ==
=== Third Round ===
Birkenhead United	3 – 3	Papakura City

Birkenhead United	2 – 1 (replay)	Papakura City

Christchurch Rangers	1 – 1*	Western (Christchurch)

Christchurch Technical	1 – 2	Cashmere Wanderers

Courier Rangers (Auckland)	2 – 2*	Manurewa

Ellerslie	7 – 3	Pakuranga Town

Hamilton	6 – 0	Affco Rangers (Ngaruawahia)

Invercargill United	1 – 5	Dunedin City

Karori Swifts	3 – 4	Waterside

Kiwi United (Palmerston North)	4 – 2	New Plymouth Old Boys

Lynndale (Auckland)	2 – 3	Takapuna City

Masterton United	1 – 2	Palmerston City (Palmerston North)

Napier City Rovers	2 – 1	Leopard United

Nelson United	3 – 1	Lower Hutt City

North Shore United	3 – 0	Mount Roskill

Porirua United	2 – 0	Petone

Queens Park (Invercargill)	0 – 5	Invercargill Thistle

Roslyn-Wakari	1 – 1*	North End United (Dunedin)

Tauranga City	1 – 4	Claudelands Rovers

Te Atatu	0 – 4	Eden (Auckland)

Turangi Wanderers	1 – 3	Rotorua Suburbs

Victoria University	3 – 5	Hungaria (Wellington)

Wellington WMC	0 – 8	Upper Hutt United

* Won on penalties by Rangers (4–3), Manurewa (6–5), and North End (6–5)

=== Fourth Round ===
Blockhouse Bay	2 – 1	Eastern Suburbs (Auckland)

Cashmere Wanderers	0 – 5	New Brighton

Caversham	2 – 1	North End United

Christchurch Rangers	1 – 6	Christchurch United

Eden	1 – 4	Takapuna City

Ellerslie	4 – 3	Birkenhead United

Gisborne City	5 – 1	Hungaria

Hamilton	0 – 1	Mount Wellington

Invercargill Thistle	2 – 0	Dunedin City

Kiwi United	1 – 0	Upper Hutt United

Napier City Rovers	3 – 2	Porirua United

North Shore United	2 – 0	Claudelands Rovers

Palmerston City	1 – 2	Wellington City

Rotorua Suburbs	0 – 3	Manurewa

Stop Out (Lower Hutt)	5 – 2	Nelson United

Waterside	1 – 3	Wellington Diamond United

=== Fifth Round ===
Caversham	2 – 1	Invercargill Thistle

Christchurch United	2 – 0	New Brighton

Ellerslie	2 – 3	Blockhouse Bay

Kiwi United	2 – 0	Stop Out

Mount Wellington	1 – 0	Eden

Napier City Rovers	1 – 9	Gisborne City

North Shore United	5 – 1	Manurewa

Wellington Diamond United	1 – 0	Wellington City

=== Sixth Round ===
Christchurch United	0 – 1	Blockhouse Bay

Kiwi United	1 – 3	Gisborne City

North Shore United	2 – 0	Caversham

Wellington Diamond United	0 – 3	Mount Wellington

=== Semi-finals ===
Gisborne City	2 – 3	Mount Wellington

North Shore United	3 – 2	Blockhouse Bay

=== Final ===
1 September 1973

Mount Wellington	3 – 0	North Shore United
Taylor 2, Houghton

Newmarket Park, Auckland
Referee: A.T. Blackburn
