= Tom McNab =

Scottish-born New Zealand footballer

Personal information
- Full name: Thomas McNab
- Date of birth: 15 July 1933
- Place of birth: Glasgow, Scotland
- Date of death: 5 April 2006 (aged 72)
- Positions: Wing-half; centre-half

Youth career
- Baillieston Juniors

Senior career*
Years	Team	Apps	(Gls)
1951–1954	Partick Thistle	18	(0)
1954–1955	Nottingham Forest	0	(0)
1955–1957	Partick Thistle	12	(0)
1957–1959	Wrexham	43	(5)
1959–1961	Barrow AFC	44	(4)
1961–1964	East Stirlingshire	85	(1)
1964–1973	Eastern Suburbs		
1974	Metro College AFC	17	(0)

International career
1967–1969	New Zealand	5	(0)
- * Club domestic league appearances and goals

Tom McNab (July 15, 1933 – April 5, 2006) is a former association football player who represented New Zealand at international level.

McNab, who captained and Auckland select side against visiting Manchester United in 1967, made his full All Whites debut in a 3–5 loss to Australia on 5 November 1967 and ended his international playing career with five A-international caps to his credit, his final cap an appearance in a 0–0 draw New Caledonia on 25 July 1969.

== Personal life ==
Following his retirement from football, McNab was injured in a workplace accident and spent the remainder of his life in a wheelchair. He died on 5 April 2006, aged 72.

== Honours ==
Wrexham

- Welsh Cup: 1956–57

Eastern Suburbs

- Chatham Cup: 1965, 1968
