= 1997 Chatham Cup =

Tournament details
- Venue(s): Park Island Ground, Napier
- Dates: 27 September 1997

Final positions
- Champions: Central United (1st title)
- Runners-up: Napier City Rovers

Awards
- Jack Batty Memorial Cup: Ivan Vicelich (Central United)

The 1997 Chatham Cup was the 70th annual nationwide knockout football competition in New Zealand.

Up to the last 16 of the competition, the cup was run in three regions (northern, central, and southern), with an open draw from the quarter-finals on. National League teams received a bye until the third round (last 64). In all, 135 teams took part in the competition, which consisted of five rounds followed by quarter-finals, semi-finals, and a final.

== The 1997 Final ==
Central United won the final, beating Napier City Rovers 3–2.

The Jack Batty Memorial Cup is awarded to the player adjudged to have made to most positive impact in the Chatham Cup final. The winner of the 1997 Jack Batty Memorial Cup was Ivan Vicelich of Central United.

== Results ==
=== Third Round ===
Avon United (Christchurch)	1 – 2	Christchurch Technical

Blockhouse Bay	4 – 0	South Auckland Rangers

Central United (Auckland)	12 – 3	Melville (Hamilton)

Claudelands Rovers	2 – 2 (aet)*	Waitakere City

Dispensary Bar (Auckland)	0 – 2	Mount Wellington

Dunedin Technical	4 – 0	Caversham

Eastbourne	0 – 1	Feilding United

Eastern Suburbs (Auckland)	0 – 6	East Coast Bays

Glenfield Rovers	3 – 2	Hamilton Wanderers

Halswell United	3 – 1	Woolston WMC

Havelock North Wanderers	0 – 3	Wellington College

Island Bay United	1 – 0	Miramar Rangers

Lynn-Avon United (Auckland)	10 – 0	Mount Maunganui

Manurewa	0 – 2	Fencibles United (Auckland)

Palmerston North Marist	7 – 0	Red Sox (Palmerston North)

Metro (Auckland)	12 – 1	Whangarei Rovers

Napier City Rovers	6 – 0	Wainuiomata

Northland United (Whangarei)	0 – 1	Three Kings United (Auckland)

North Wellington	2 – 1	Wellington Marist

Onehunga Sports	2 – 1	Ellerslie

Otahuhu United	0 – 3	Papatoetoe

Takapuna City	11 – 1	Carlton (Auckland)

Tararua United (Upper Hutt)	0 – 2	Waterside Karori

Tawa	0 – 2	Western Suburbs FC (Porirua)

Te Atatu	4 – 0	Cadcam Services (Auckland)

Victoria University	2 – 3	Wanganui East Athletic

Wairarapa United (Masterton)	0 – 3	Manawatu (Palmerston North)

Wellington Olympic	2 – 0	Petone

Wellington United	0 – 1	Lower Hutt City

West Harbour (Auckland)	0 – 3	Tauranga City

Whangarei	0 – 7	Papakura City

* Won on penalties by Waitakere City (6–5)
"Waihopai' received a bye to the Fourth Round.

=== Fourth Round ===
Dunedin Technical	10 – 0	Waihopai (Invercargill)

Feilding United	0 – 4	Palmerston North Marist

Halswell United	1 – 2	Christchurch Technical

Lower Hutt City	2 – 3	Manawatu

Lynn-Avon United	2 – 0	Fencibles United

Metro	2 – 2 (aet)*	Three Kings United

Mount Wellington	2 – 1	Glenfield Rovers

Onehunga Sports	3 – 1	Papatoetoe

Takapuna City	2 – 4	Blockhouse Bay

Tauranga City	1 – 0	Papakura City

Te Atatau	0 – 3	East Coast Bays

Waitakere City	1 – 2	Central United

Wanganui East Athletic	0 – 5	Wellington Olympic

Waterside Karori	1 – 2	North Wellington

Wellington College	2 – 5	Island Bay United

Western Suburbs FC	2 – 3	Napier City Rovers

* Won on penalties by Three Kings United (3–2)

=== Fifth Round ===
22 June

Blockhouse Bay	4 – 5	Central United
Carmody 2, Dixon, Lynch		M. Urlovic 3 (1 pen.), Harris 2

Whitney Street, Blockhouse Bay
Referee: C. Borland

Christchurch Technical	1 – 2	Dunedin Technical

Island Bay United	0 – 2	North Wellington

Manawatu	1 – 0	Wellington Olympic

Napier City Rovers	5 – 0	Palmerston North Marist

Onehunga Sports	2 – 0	East Coast Bays

Tauranga City	3 – 2	Lynn-Avon United

Three Kings United	0 – 1	Mount Wellington

=== Quarter-finals ===
Central United	1 – 0	Tauranga City

Dunedin Technical	5 – 1	Manawatu

Mount Wellington	3 – 2	North Wellington

Onehunga Sports	1 – 2	Napier City Rovers

=== Semi-finals ===
17 August

Mount Wellington	1 – 4	Central United
Armstrong		Loftus 2, Torrens, Fowler (pen.)

Napier City Rovers	3 – 0	Dunedin Technical

=== Final ===
27 September

Central United	3 – 2 (aet)	Napier City Rovers
P. Urlovic 2, Rufer		Akers, Oliver

Park Island Ground, Napier
Referee: S. Sargent
