= 1963 Chatham Cup =

Tournament details
- Venue(s): Basin Reserve, Wellington
- Dates: 15 June – 31 August 1963

Final positions
- Champions: North Shore United (3rd title)
- Runners-up: Nomads

The 1963 Chatham Cup was the 36th annual nationwide knockout football competition in New Zealand.

The competition was run on a regional basis, with regional associations each holding separate qualifying rounds. Teams taking part in the final rounds are known to have included Otangarei United, Blockhouse Bay, North Shore United, Papatoetoe, Hamilton Technical Old Boys, Kahukura (Rotorua), Eastern Union (Gisborne), Moturoa (New Plymouth), Hastings United, Wanganui United, St. Andrews (Manawatu), Wellington Marist, Nelson Rangers, Christchurch Nomads, Timaru Thistle, Northern (Dunedin), and Invercargill Thistle. It is known that unfancied side Otematata, from Otago's Maniototo district caused a surprise by reaching the last 16 stage.

== The 1963 final ==
During the early 1960s North Shore were by far the strongest team in the country. This was their fourth final in five years, and with the Chatham Cup they completed a treble which included the Auckland regional league and the Rothmans Cup competition. They easily accounted for the Christchurch team of Nomads in the final, and with the exception of the tail-end of the first half dominated the match. The only goal of the first period came through Shore's Middleton (some sources say winger Peter Oden), but the lead was doubled ten minutes after the break through a header from Peter Maynard. McNicholl (some sources say Oden) added a third and North Shore coasted for the remainder of the match, allowing Nomads' Robin Muirson to gain a consolation goal for the southerners.

== Results ==
=== First round ===
15 June 1963

Caversham	4 – 5	Green Island

Caledonian Ground, South Dunedin
Referee: A. Patton
15 June 1963

Northern (Dunedin)	4 – 3	King Edward TCOB (Dunedin)

15 June 1963

Roslyn-Wakari	4 – 0	Dunedin HSOB

Gardens Corner, Dunedin North
Referee: K. Young
15 June 1963

Saint Kilda	3 – 0	Mosgiel

Tonga Park, Dunedin
Referee: J. Warner

=== Second round ===
22 June 1963

Roslyn-Wakari	3 – 0	Green Island
Kernaghan 2, Ure

Caledonian Ground, South Dunedin
Referee: N. de Meyer
22 June 1963

Saint Kilda	2 – 8	Northern
Sepsi, Van Schraa		P. Little 4, G. Little, Turnhout (og), Higgins, Rae

Referee: R. MacDonald

=== Last 32 ===
6 July 1963

Otematata	7 – 1	Oamaru

22 June 1963

Moturoa	5–2	St. Andrews
L. Varga 2, E. Meuli, J. McManus, K. McDonald		D. May, M. Beatty

Western Park, New Plymouth
Referee: Mr. A. Seeling

=== Last 16 ===
29 June 1963

Invercargill Thistle	5 – 0	Invercargill United

13 July 1963

Otematata	1 – 3	Northern
Caldwell		Higgins, Rae (pen.), Berry

Oamaru
Referee: W. Bamberry
29 June 1963

Wanganui United	6 - 4 aet	Moturoa
R. Toyne 2, B. Webber 3, B. Olding		K. McDonald, J. McManus, (M. Ram og.), ?

Cooks Gardens, Whanganui
Referee: Mr. C. Seddon
29 June 1963

Nelson Rangers	2 – 1	Motueka
O. Bajema, ?		G. Textor

Nelson
6 July 1963

Wellington Marist	3 - 2	Northern (Wellington)

Basin Reserve, Wellington
13 July 1963

Blockhouse Bay	3 - 1	Kahukura

Blandford Park, Auckland
13 July 1963

North Shore United	8 - 1	Papatoetoe

Blandford Park, Auckland
13 July 1963

Timaru Thistle	0 - 7	Nomads

Caledonian Grounds, Timaru

=== Last eight ("Zone finals") ===
27 July 1963

Invercargill Thistle	1 – 4	Northern
Frost		G. Little, P. Little, Greaves, Berry

Invercargill
27 July 1963

Nomads	3 – 1	Nelson Rangers

English Park, Christchurch
27 July 1963

Wellington Marist	3 – 1	Wanganui United

Basin Reserve, Wellington
27 July 1963

North Shore United	3 - 2	Blockhouse Bay

Blandford Park, Auckland

=== Semi-finals ("Island finals") ===
South Island Final
10 August 1963

Northern	0 – 3	Nomads
		Muirson 2, McParland

Caledonian Ground, South Dunedin
Referee: T.J. Ward
North Island Final
10 August 1963

North Shore United	9 – 2	Wellington Marist
T. McNicholl 4, W. Nicholas 2, H. Russell, K. Armstrong, J. Maynard		K. Williams, T. McCabe

Blandford Park, Auckland

=== Final ===
1963 Chatham Cup Final
31 August 1963

North Shore United	4 – 1	Nomads
Middleton, Maynard, McNicholl*		Muirson

Basin Reserve, Wellington
Referee: R.E. McDonald

Note: Some sources, such as Hilton (1991), give North Shore's goalscorers as Oden 2, Maynard.
