= 1960 Chatham Cup =

Tournament details
- Venue(s): Basin Reserve, Wellington
- Dates: 27 August 1960

Final positions
- Champions: North Shore United (2nd title)
- Runners-up: Technical Old Boys

The 1960 Chatham Cup was the 33rd annual nationwide knockout football competition in New Zealand.

The competition was run on a regional basis, with regional associations each holding separate qualifying rounds. Teams taking part in the final rounds are known to have included North Shore United, Hamilton Technical Old Boys, Kahukura (Bay of Plenty), Eastern Union (Gisborne), Moturoa (New Plymouth), Napier Rovers, Wanganui Athletic, Kiwi United (Manawatu), Masterton Athletic (Wairarapa), Northern Wellington, Nelson Athletic (Tasman), Technical Old Boys (Christchurch), Northern (Dunedin), and Invercargill Thistle (Southland)

== The 1960 final ==
North Shore United won the cup for a second time, having previously been champions in 1952. The aggregate of eight goals in the final equalled the record set in the 1940 final, previously equalled in 1955 and 1958. The final was the perfect way for North Shore to celebrate their 75th anniversary. From a 1–1 half-time deadlock, NSU quickly raced to a 3–1 lead. Tech reduced the deficit before North Shore added two more goals. Technical completed the scoring with the sixth goal of the half, but were left two goals adrift of the winners. North Shore United's goals were scored by Tony Lowndes (2), John Ryan, Tom Paterson, and Ken Armstrong, while Ted Charlton, John Campbell, and Arthur Verham scored for Tech.

== Results ==
=== North and South Island semi-finals ===
23 July 1960

Kahukura	1 - 2	North Shore United

Rotorua
6 August 1960

Moturoa	2 - 1	Northern (Wellington)
E. Meuli, L. Polyanszky	Report	B. Cooper

Western Park, New Plymouth
Attendance: 1500
Referee: Mr. F. M. Plant (Wairarapa)
23 July 1960

Nelson Athletic	3 - 5	Technical Old Boys
Besant, Stewart, (I. Graham og.)	Report	Charlton 3 (2 pen.), W. Shannon ×2

Victory Square, Nelson
Referee: Mr. J. Nicol
23 July 1960

Northern	6 - 0	Invercargill Thistle

Caledonian Ground, Dunedin

=== North & South Island Finals ===
South Island Final
6 August 1960

Technical Old Boys	5 - 1	Northern
Charlton ×2, Jones, Munroe, Campbell	Report	W. Berry

English Park, Christchurch
Referee: Mr. J. Cherry
North Island Final
13 August 1960

North Shore United	10 - 2	Moturoa
Paterson ×3, Ryan, Middleton ×3, Lowndes, Armstrong, Oden	Report	L. Varga ×2

Blandford Park, Auckland
Attendance: 3000
Referee: Mr. Royce

=== Final ===
1960 Chatham Cup Final
27 August 1960

North Shore United	5 – 3	Technical Old Boys
Lowndes ×2, Armstrong, Paterson, Ryan	Report	Verham, Campbell, Charlton

Basin Reserve, Wellington
Attendance: 7500
Referee: A. Williams
