= New Brighton F.C. =

New Brighton F.C. may refer to any of three football teams that are or have been based in New Brighton, Merseyside:

- New Brighton A.F.C. - a former association football club.
- New Brighton Tower F.C. - a former association football club.
- New Brighton F.C. (rugby union) - a rugby union club.

It may also refer to a New Zealand football team, from New Brighton, a suburb of Christchurch:

- New Brighton A.F.C., New Zealand - an association football club
