= 1952 Chatham Cup =

Tournament details
- Venue(s): Basin Reserve, Wellington
- Dates: 30 August 1952
- Teams: Title shared: North Shore United (1st title); Western (3rd title)

The 1952 Chatham Cup was the 25th annual nationwide knockout football competition in New Zealand.

The competition was run on a regional basis, with regional associations each holding separate qualifying rounds. Teams taking part in the final rounds are known to have included North Shore United (Auckland), Napier High School Old Boys (Hawkes Bay), Pukemiro (Waikato), Mangakino (Bay of Plenty), Wanganui United (Wanganui) Masterton Athletic (Wairarapa), Kiwi United (Manawatu), Seatoun (Wellington), Woodbourne (Marlborough), Western (Christchurch), and Roslyn-Wakari (Dunedin), Runanga (Westland), Brigadiers (Southland).

== The 1952 final ==
The final was dominated by Western; they scored early through Noel Joseph, and it was only the heroics of North Shore keeper Roy Gordon who stopped the Christchurch side going further ahead. With ten minutes left to play Herb Moyle scrambled an equaliser and the match was sent to extra time. The added half-hour was scoreless.

In the days prior to penalty shootouts and replays, tied matches were decided on the number of corners won, and it was only through the last kick of the game that Western gained a corner to level the count. With the score and number of corners equal, it was decided that the trophy would be shared between the two sides. This was the only time this was to happen; replays were introduced to settle tied finals thereafter, with the first replay being played in the 1970 final.

== Results ==
10 May 1952

North Shore United	1–0	Ponsonby

Blandford Park, Auckland
17 May 1952

Pt. Chevalier	1–5	North Shore United

Seymour Park, Auckland
24 May 1952

Grey Lynn/Comrades	1–8	North Shore United

Blandford Park, Auckland
7 June 1952

North Shore United	2–1	Eastern Suburbs

Blandford Park Auckland
9 August 1952

Mangakino	0–4	North Shore United

Rotorua
North Island Final
16 August 1952

North Shore United	3–1	Seatoun

Blandford Park, Auckland
Final
30 August 1952

North Shore United	1–1 (aet)	Western
Moyle		Joseph

Basin Reserve, Wellington
Referee: W.T. Dodd
