= Adrian Elrick =

New Zealand footballer (born 1949)

Personal information
- Full name: Adrian Coroon Elrick
- Date of birth: 29 September 1949 (age 77)
- Place of birth: Aberdeen, Scotland
- Height: 1.71 m (5 ft 7 in)
- Positions: Left back; sweeper

Senior career*
Years	Team	Apps	(Gls)
1968–1985	North Shore United	301	(98)

International career
1975–1984	New Zealand	53	(1)
- * Club domestic league appearances and goals

Adrian Coroon Elrick (born 29 September 1949 in Scotland) is an association football player who represented New Zealand.

== Life and career ==
Moving from Scotland at a young age to New Zealand, Adrian became part of the Auckland football scene. He spent most of his career playing for North Shore United.

Elrick made his full All Whites debut in a 2–0 win over China on 26 July 1975.

He represented the All Whites for all three matches at the 1982 FIFA World Cup in Spain, where they lost to Scotland, USSR and Brazil. Elrick was fortunate enough to grab Zico's coveted No.10 shirt at the end of the New Zealand vs. Brazil game.

Elrick ended his international playing career having pulled on the all white shirt 92 times, including 53 A-international caps in which he scored one goal, his final cap coming in a 0–1 loss to Bahrain on 24 April 1984.

== Coaching ==
As part of Ian Gray's coaching staff in 2010, Elrick took over the defensive coaching duties for North Shore United.

== Honours ==
North Shore United

- Chatham Cup: 1979; runner-up 1973

New Zealand

- Trans-Tasman Cup: 1983
