= Duncan McVey =

New Zealand footballer

Personal information
- Full name: Dr Duncan Joseph McVey
- Date of birth: 2 March 1938
- Place of birth: Baillieston, Glasgow, Scotland
- Date of death: 8 February 2010
- Place of death: Wellington, New Zealand
- Position: Inside forward

Senior career*
Years	Team	Apps	(Gls)
- Northern

International career
1962	New Zealand	1	(2)
- * Club domestic league appearances and goals

Duncan Joseph McVey (2 March 1938 – 8 February 2010) was a New Zealand footballer and General Practitioner who represented New Zealand at international level.

== Biography ==
Duncan Joseph McVey was born on 2 March 1938 in Baillieston, a working-class neighbourhood of Glasgow, Scotland, to Anthony Peter McVey, a boilermaker, and Mary Jane Johnstone. He had an older brother, two younger brothers, and a younger sister.

The family lived at 74 South Scott Street until, when Duncan was 13, they emigrated to New Zealand aboard the Tamaroa, leaving Southampton on 16 November 1951.

McVey made a solitary official international appearance for New Zealand in a 4–1 win over New Caledonia on 2 June 1962, McVey and Trefor Pugh scoring twice each for New Zealand.

In later life, McVey went on to become a GP and died on 8 February 2010 in Wellington, New Zealand, at the age of 71.
