= Donald Gray Memorial Cup =

- Country: New Zealand
- Confederation: OFC (Oceania)
- Number of clubs: 6
- Level on pyramid: 4
- Promotion to: FootballSouth Premier League
- Current champions: Winton (1st title) (2025)
- Most championships: Thistle (21 titles)
- Current: Donald Gray 2022

The Donald Gray Memorial Cup is the premier men's football competition in Southland, New Zealand. It sits below the Southern Football Premier League and above Southland Division 1.

== Current clubs ==
As of 2026 season.

Team	Stadium	Location	2025 season
Gore Wanderers	Hyde Park	Gore	6th
Old Boys (2)	Waverley Park	Invercargill	4th
Queens Park (2)	Surrey Park	Invercargill	3rd
Thistle	Turnbull Thomson Park	Invercargill	4th
Waihopai	Surrey Park	Invercargill	5th
Winton	Central Southland College	Winton	1st

(2) — Denotes club's second team

== Past winners ==
List of winners from 1950-2009
List of winners from 2003–

- 1950 - Brigadiers
- 1951 - Brigadiers
- 1952 - Brigadiers
- 1953 - Brigadiers & Thistle FC
- 1954 - Brigadiers
- 1955 - Thistle FC
- 1956 - Brigadiers
- 1957 - Hotspurs
- 1958 - Brigadiers
- 1959 - Invercargill Rovers
- 1960 - Thistle FC
- 1961 - Thistle FC
- 1962 - Thistle FC
- 1963 - Thistle FC
- 1964 - Thistle FC
- 1965 - Thistle FC
- 1966 - Thistle FC
- 1967 - Invercargill United
- 1968 - Invercargill United
- 1969 - Thistle FC
- 1970 - Thistle FC
- 1971 - Thistle FC
- 1972 - Thistle FC & Invercargill United
- 1973 - Thistle FC
- 1974 - Southland Boys' High School
- 1975 - Southland Boys' High School
- 1976 - Thistle FC
- 1977 - Thistle FC
- 1978 - Queens Park AFC
- 1979 - Old Boys' AFC
- 1980 - Invercargill United
- 1981 - Invercargill United
- 1982 - Thistle FC
- 1983 - Gore Wanderers
- 1984 - Thistle FC
- 1985 - Old Boys' AFC
- 1986 - Waihopai
- 1987 - Southland Marist
- 1988 - Old Boys' AFC
- 1989 - Queens Park AFC
- 1990 - Thistle FC
- 1991 - Invercargill United
- 1992 - Queens Park AFC
- 1993 - Thistle FC
- 1994 - Queenstown Rovers
- 1995 - Queenstown Rovers
- 1996 - Queenstown Rovers
- 1997 - Invercargill United
- 1998 - Southend United
- 1999 - Queenstown Rovers
- 2000 - Queenstown Rovers
- 2001 - Waihopai
- 2002 - Waihopai
- 2003 - Waihopai
- 2004 - Queens Park AFC
- 2005 - Southend United
- 2006 - Queens Park AFC
- 2007 - Southend United
- 2008 - Queens Park AFC
- 2009 - Old Boys' AFC
- 2010 - Old Boys' AFC
- 2011 - Old Boys' AFC
- 2012 - Old Boys' AFC
- 2013 - Southend United
- 2014 - Old Boys' AFC
- 2015 - Queenstown Rovers
- 2016 - Old Boys' AFC
- 2017 - Gore Wanderers
- 2018 - Gore Wanderers
- 2019 - Old Boys' AFC
- 2020 - Queens Park AFC
- 2021 - Queens Park AFC
- 2022 - Thistle FC
- 2023 - Old Boys' AFC
- 2024 - Queens Park AFC
- 2025 - Winton FC
