= Alex Smith (New Zealand footballer) =

New Zealand footballer

Personal information
- Full name: Alex Smith
- Place of birth: New Zealand

Senior career*
Years	Team	Apps	(Gls)
- New Brighton

International career
1973	New Zealand	1	(0)
- * Club domestic league appearances and goals

Alex Smith is a former football (soccer) player who represented New Zealand at international level.

Smith made a solitary official international appearance for New Zealand in a 0–0 draw with Iran on 12 August 1973.
