= Derek Phillips (New Zealand footballer) =

New Zealand footballer

Personal information
- Place of birth: New Zealand
- Position: Goalkeeper

Senior career*
Years	Team	Apps	(Gls)
- New Brighton

International career
1968–1969	New Zealand	6	(0)
- * Club domestic league appearances and goals

Derek Phillips is a New Zealand former footballer who played as a goalkeeper. He represented the New Zealand national team at international level.

Phillips made his full All Whites debut in a 1–3 loss to New Caledonia on 8 October 1968 and ended his international playing career with six A-international caps to his credit, his final cap an appearance in a 0–2 loss to Israel on 1 October 1969.
