= Waitara Soccer Club =

- Full name: Waitara Soccer Club Inc.
- Founded: 1905
- Ground: Manukorihi Park, Waitara
- Chairman: Jason Swete
- League: Taranaki Division 2
- 2026: Taranaki Division 2, 1st of 10
- Website: https://www.sporty.co.nz/waitarasoccer
Home colours	Away colours

Waitara Soccer Club is an association football club from North Taranaki, New Zealand. The club competes in the Taranaki Division 2. Its home ground and clubrooms are at Manukorihi Park in the town of Waitara adjacent to the Waitara River.

In its first year the Waitara club won the Julian Cup and with it the 1905 Taranaki Championship. In September 1905 the champion Waitara side played a match against Corinthians, the touring Auckland champions, at the Camp Reserve, Waitara.

Waitara has competed for the Chatham Cup, with their best performance coming in the 1965 tournament, when they reached the fifth round. The 1965 cup run included wins against Spotswood College, Taranaki champions Moturoa, Whanganui champions Wanganui United, before being defeated by Hawke's Bay champions Napier Rovers. Waitara last competed for the Chatham Cup in 2008 and were knocked out at Manukorihi Park in the second round of the competition by Napier City Rovers.

== Honours ==
Taranaki Premiership - 2007, 2008.

Taranaki Championship (Julian Cup) - 1905, 1938, 1966, 1977.

Duff Rose Bowl - 1937, 1938, 1965, 2008.
