= Trefor Pugh =

New Zealand footballer

Personal information
- Full name: Trefor J L Pugh
- Place of birth: New Zealand

Senior career*
Years	Team	Apps	(Gls)
1962	Eastern Union		
1965	Eastern Suburbs		

International career
1962	New Zealand	1	(2)
- * Club domestic league appearances and goals

Trefor Pugh is a former football (soccer) player who represented New Zealand at international level.

Pugh made a solitary official international appearance for New Zealand in a 4–1 win over New Caledonia on 2 June 1962, Pugh and Duncan McVey scoring twice each for New Zealand.
