= Graham Storer =

New Zealand footballer

Personal information
- Full name: Graham Storer
- Place of birth: New Zealand
- Position: Defender

Senior career*
Years	Team	Apps	(Gls)
- New Brighton
- Christchurch United

International career
1974–1976	New Zealand		
1975–1976	New Zealand	7	(0)
- * Club domestic league appearances and goals

Graham Storer is a former footballer who represented New Zealand at international level.

Storer represented New Zealand at under 20 level before making his full All Whites debut in a 2–1 win over China on 20 May 1975 and ended his international playing career with seven A-international caps to his credit, his final cap an appearance in a 0–1 loss to Australia on 29 February 1976.
