= John Hanson (New Zealand footballer) =

New Zealand footballer

Personal information
- Full name: John Hanson
- Place of birth: New Zealand

Senior career*
Years	Team	Apps	(Gls)
- Christchurch United

International career
1988	New Zealand	4	(0)
- * Club domestic league appearances and goals

John Hanson is a former association football player who represented New Zealand at international level.

Hanson made his full All Whites debut in a 2–0 win over Chinese Taipei on 20 March 1988 and ended his international playing career with four official caps to his credit, his fourth and final cap an appearance in a 0–1 loss to Fiji on 19 November 1988.
