= Terry Haydon =

New Zealand footballer

Personal information
- Full name: Terry J F Haydon
- Place of birth: New Zealand

Senior career*
Years	Team	Apps	(Gls)
- Christchurch Rangers

International career
1968	New Zealand	2	(1)
- * Club domestic league appearances and goals

Terry Haydon is a former association football player who represented New Zealand at international level.

Haydon played two official A-international matches for the New Zealand in 1968, scoring in the first, a 5–0 win over Pacific neighbours Fiji on 17 September. His second and final appearance was as a substitute a 1–3 loss to New Caledonia on 8 October 1968.
