= Stokes Valley FC =

- Full name: Stokes Valley Football Club
- Founded: 1967 (59 years ago)
- Ground: Delaney Park, Stokes Valley, Lower Hutt
- Chairman: Glenn Perry
- League: Capital 1
- 2026: Capital 1, 10th of 10
- Website: www.svfootball.org.nz
Home colours

Stokes Valley Football Club is an amateur football club based in Lower Hutt, New Zealand. The club competes in the Capital 1.

== History ==
The club was formed on the 7 March 1967 from a meeting at St. Phillip's Church Hall. After entering the local leagues in Division 6, the first team won promotion in the next seven of the clubs first nine years.

From the 1970s through to 1993 the club bounced between Divisions one to three before they saw promotion to the top league Central League in 1994. They would spend three years in the division before pulling out in 1997 due to costs and lack of players.

The club also competes in the Chatham Cup, New Zealand's premier knockout tournaments for men. The best run they have had in the competition is making the final sixteen twice. They first did it in 1979 before losing 0–4 to Stop Out, then again in 1988, this time losing 0–2 to Gisborne City.

== Honours ==
- Central League Division Three South – 1978
- Central League Division Two – 1992
- Central League Division One – 1993
