= Waihopai AFC =

- Full name: Waihopai Association Football Club
- Founded: 1950
- Ground: Surrey Park, Glengarry, Invercargill, New Zealand
- Coach: Peter McAnelly
- League: Southland Premier
- 2026: Southland Premier, 6th of 6
Home colours

Waihopai is a football club based in Invercargill, New Zealand. The club now serves as a feeder club to the Southland United team. The club competes in the Southland Premier.

Waihopai was founded in 1950 and plays its home games at Surrey Park. Waihopai was part of the Southern League from 1975 to 1999 and was also a member of the FootballSouth Premier League in 2000, prior to the 2001 creation of the united Southland Spirit FC team.

Waihopai reached the quarter-finals of the Chatham Cup in 1964, having qualified as the champion side in the Southland Region. The club has reached the last 32 team stage of the competition on four further occasions, in 1969, 1990, 1995, and 1997. They also have won the Churchill Rosebowl thirteen times for the club in Southland that makes it the furthest in the Chatham Cup. Waihopai are four-times winners of the Donald Gray Memorial Cup, in 1986, 2001, 2002, and 2003. It is awarded to the Southland team that wins the senior grade competition.
