= Tony Gowans =

New Zealand footballer

Personal information
- Full name: Anthony W Gowans
- Place of birth: New Zealand

Senior career*
Years	Team	Apps	(Gls)
- Christchurch City

International career
1967	New Zealand	3	(0)
- * Club domestic league appearances and goals

Tony Gowans is a former association football player who represented New Zealand at international level.

Gowans played three official A-international matches for New Zealand in 1967 at the Vietnam National Day Soccer Tournament: a 3–5 loss to Australia on 5 November 1967, a 3–1 win over Singapore on 8 November and a 1–5 loss to South Vietnam on 10 November 1967.
