= John Houghton (New Zealand footballer) =

New Zealand footballer (1945–2019)

Personal information
- Full name: John E Houghton
- Date of birth: 1945
- Place of birth: Scotland
- Date of death: 4 July 2019 (aged 73–74)
- Place of death: New Zealand

Senior career*
| Years | Team | Apps | (Gls) |
| 1971 | Mt Wellington | | |
| 1975–1977 | Mt Wellington | | |

International career
| 1971–1977 | New Zealand | 15 | (2) |
- * Club domestic league appearances and goals

John E. Houghton (1945 – 4 July 2019) was an association football player who represented New Zealand.

== International career ==
Houghton made his full All Whites debut as a substitute in a 2–4 loss to New Caledonia on 18 July 1971 and ended his international playing career with 15 A-international caps and 2 goals to his credit, his final cap being an appearance in a 1–1 draw with Australia on 30 March 1977.

== Death ==
Houghton died in New Zealand on 4 July 2019.
