= Memorial Park, Motueka =

Sports venue in Motueka, New Zealand

Coordinates: 41°06′33.66″S 173°0′28.10″E

Memorial Park
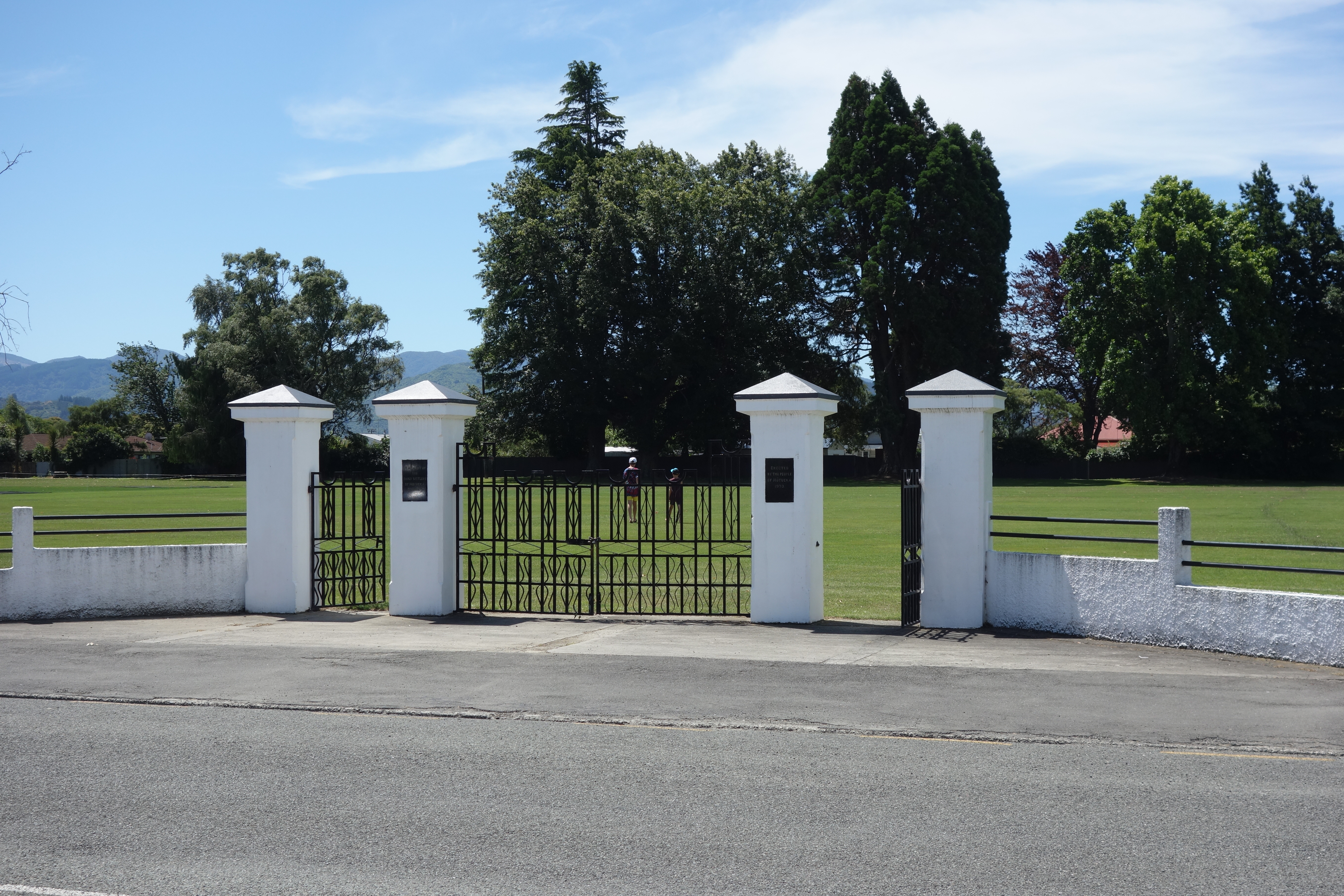
- Gates leading into Memorial Park
- Interactive map of Memorial Park

Ground information
- Location: Motueka, New Zealand
- Country: New Zealand
- Establishment: 1950 (first recorded match)

Team information
Central Districts	(1987)
- As of 3 November 2011; Source: Ground profile

Memorial Park is a cricket ground in Motueka, Tasman, New Zealand.

Memorial Park is jointly owned by Tasman District Council and Wakatū Incorporation, a company representing 4,000 shareholders who are descendants of the original Te Tau Ihu Māori of the area.

The first recorded match held on the ground came in January 1950 when Nelson played Marlborough in the 1950/51 Hawke Cup. The ground later held a single List A match when Central Districts played Otago in the 1987/88 Shell Cup, which Central Districts won by 52 runs. Senior cricket hasn't been played at the ground since.
