= Surrey Park =

Park and sports venue in New Zealand

Coordinates: 46°24′15″S 168°23′00″E

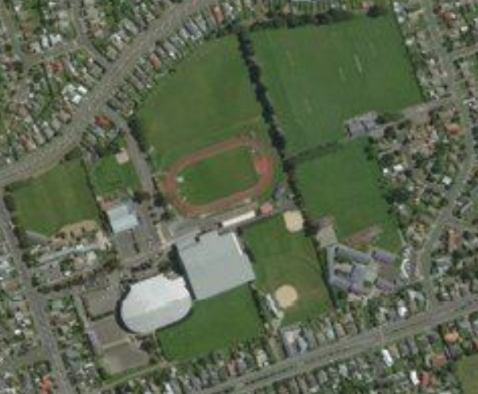
- Satellite view of Surrey Park, with Stadium Southland lower left
- Interactive map of Surrey Park
- Address: New Zealand
- Location: Invercargill, New Zealand

Surrey Park is a major sports venue, located in the Invercargill, New Zealand suburb of Glengarry, 2 km to the east of the city centre.

Surrey Park's facilities include three rugby grounds, three football grounds, four softball pitches, an athletics track, and the SIT Zero Fees Velodrome. ILT Stadium Southland, Invercargill's main indoor sports venue, is located at the southern end of the park, close to Tay Street, one of Invercargill's main arterial roads and part of SH 1.

The park and stadium are the main venues for many Invercargill-based sports teams, among them the Southern Steel (netball), Queens Park AFC and Waihopai AFC (football), and the Southland Sharks (basketball).
