= John Wrathall (footballer) =

New Zealand footballer

Personal information
- Date of birth: 1937 or 1938
- Place of birth: New Zealand
- Date of death: 5 October 1975
- Place of death: Eastcote, London
- Position: Striker

Senior career*
Years	Team	Apps	(Gls)
	Eastern Suburbs	390	(361)

International career
1960	New Zealand	2	(0)
- * Club domestic league appearances and goals

John Wrathall is a New Zealand former soccer player who represented New Zealand at international level.

Wrathall played two official A-international matches for the New Zealand in 1960, both against Pacific minnows Tahiti, the first a 5–1 win on 5 September, the second a 2–1 win on 12 September 1960.

Wrathall had a very long career in senior football, playing for over 25 years, and recorded his 1000th goal playing for Eastern Suburbs against Mount Albert-Ponsonby in the 1971 New Zealand National Soccer League.
