= South Auckland Rangers =

- Full name: South Auckland Rangers Association Football and Sports Club
- Nickname: Rangers
- Founded: 1989
- Ground: Rongomai Park, Manukau
- Capacity: 1000
- Coach: Brock Radich
- League: NRFL Northern Conference
- 2026: NRF League One, 1st of 8 (promoted)
Home colours	Away colours

South Auckland Rangers is an association football club in New Zealand, affiliated to Northern Region Football. The club competes in the NRFL Northern Conference.

The club play at the brand new Rongomai Park in Manukau, Auckland.

The team are regular entrants to the Chatham Cup, their best performance coming in 1995, when they reached the Fifth Round (last 16 stage).

== History ==
The club started as the Otara Rangers in 1973. In 1989 the Otara Rangers (based at Ngati Otara) merged with Clove nor Park United to form the club now known as "The South Auckland Rangers" and remained based at Ngati Otara until 1989.

The club moved to James Watson Park due to a promise made by the Manukau City Council to provide grounds solely for soccer use, so as to avoid any conflict with rugby league. When the South Auckland Rangers Association Football and Sports Club, was formed, the club had five senior and seven junior soccer teams.

As with neighbours Mangere United, SAR is one of the few surviving clubs in New Zealand to have been formed around a core of players predominantly of one ethnicity, with many of the players being of Fijian origin. Although this is now changing with 50–60% of current registered players being of ethnic origin other than Fijian.

The South Auckland Rangers are presently located at their new premises, Rongomai Park (with seven fields) where they have been since in November 2014.

The new clubrooms at Rongomai will be shared with the Southern Braves Softball Club and will be jointly administered with them via a Trust. Both clubs will provide two trustees each with a fifth independent trustee to be approved by both parties.

== See also ==
- Auckland Football Federation
