= Gore Wanderers AFC =

- Full name: Gore Wanderers AFC
- Founded: 1964
- Ground: Hyde Park, Gore
- Chairman: Mel McKenzie
- Coach: Michael Hall
- League: Southland Premier
- 2026: Southland Premier, 5th of 6
Home colours

Gore Wanderers AFC is an association football club based in the southern New Zealand town of Gore, and is the only senior club with men's and women's teams in Eastern Southland. The club competes in the Southland Premier.

The club was founded in 1964, several years after the demise of Gore's previous team, Gore Rovers. The team has won Southland's senior competition, the Donald Gray Memorial Cup, twice, in 1983 and 2017. The team combined with Gore's age-group team, Junior Wanderers, in 2018.

The team has competed in the country's premier club knockout competition — the Chatham Cup — semi-regularly since 1965, reaching the last sixteen in their debut season and 1967.
