= Queens Park AFC =

- Full name: Queens Park Association Football Club
- Nicknames: Park, QP
- Founded: 1957
- Ground: ILT Football Turf; Invercargill, New Zealand
- Capacity: 10,000
- Manager: Patrick Murphy
- League: Southern Premier League
- 2026: Southern Premier League, 4th of 9
Home colours	Away colours

Queens Park AFC is a football club, based in Invercargill, New Zealand. The club participates in the Southern Premier League, and has its clubrooms at Surrey Park.

== History ==
Queens Park Association Football Club was formed in 1957 by Alexander Stojkovich and in 1958 the team made its debut in the local Invercargill Second Grade competition. In 1960 the senior team was promoted to the premier Southland competition, the Donald Gray Memorial Cup.

When the Southern League was formed in 1968, Queens Park entered the First Division, finishing 9th. However at the end of the 1969 season the club was relegated to the Southern League Second Division. 1972 saw Queens Park win the Southern League Division Two South & the promotion/relegation play-off to rejoin the Southern League Division One. The club played in this league until 1975, when some poor results saw it relegated to Southern League Division Two South. In 1977 Queens Park again won Division Two South, but failed to gain promotion this time around. For the 1980 season the Southern League was split into Northern and Southern Zones, with Queens Park joining the Southern Zone. The club continued to play in this league until it was again restructured in 1986. In 1987 Queens Park played in the reformed Southern League Division Two South, before withdrawing in 1988 to supply players to the Southland United amalgamation.

After Southland United was disbanded at the end of 1991, Queens Park was left without representation at an inter-provincial level until 1996, when the club re-entered the Southern League. Events that transpired that season, chiefly the revival of Southland United, poor results (particularly towards the end of the season), and financial constraints resulted in Queens Park withdrawing for 1997 to once again to support Southland United.

Queens Park AFC has entered the New Zealand Football national knockout competition, the Chatham Cup, in most years since 1965 apart from a break from 1997 to 2003. The club has made the Fifth Round five times, in 1966, 1968, 1969, 1972, and 1975. Since 1975 the club has not performed as well in the competition, rarely making it past the second round since they re-entered the competition in 2004.

== Recent years ==
As of 2020 Queens Park is one of the biggest senior football clubs in Southland, with teams in multiple leagues.

In 2021 the Premier men's team completed the Donald Gray season unbeaten, winning the Donald Gray Memorial Cup, the Larry O'Rourke Cup, and the Charity Cup. The Women's Kolk Cup Team also went unbeaten winning the Kolk Cup, Ottley Challenge trophy and the Knockout Cup. Both teams won their leagues for the second season in a row.

In November 2021 the club announced that it would be entering a team in the Southern Premier League during the 2022 season after being invited to return to the competition.

In 2024, Queen's Park entered the Women's Southern Premiership, thus competing at the highest regional level alongside the men's side.

That same year, the club won the Donald Gray title with its' men's reserve side, the first side to do so while competing in the Southern Premier League.

== Season by season record ==
2022- (Southern Premiership)

Season	Southern Premiership									Chatham Cup	Top scorer	
Season	P	W	D	L	F	A	GD	Pts	Pos	Chatham Cup	Name	Goals
2022	18	8	0	10	31	44	-13	24	5th	R3	(Kenya) David Mwangi	9
2023	18	8	2	8	26	34	-8	26	5th	R3	(Japan) Ryo Okuyama	6
2024	18	6	2	10	30	40	-10	20	8th	R2	(New Zealand) Anton Fitzgerald	8
2025	16	7	2	7	40	37	+3	23	6th	R3	(New Zealand) Anton Fitzgerald	6
2026	16	7	3	6	41	30	+11	24	5th	R3	(Brazil) Rodrigo Schmidt de Camargo	10
