= Christchurch High School Old Boys =

Football club in New Zealand

H.S.O.B.
- Full name: Christchurch High School Old Boys
- Founded: 1957
- Ground: Edgar MacIntosh Park, Christchurch
Home colours

Christchurch High School Old Boys is a soccer club in Christchurch, New Zealand.

Though currently operating principally as a masters/grade league club, HSOB has long been prominent in the Canterbury region, and has reached the third round stage of the country's premier knockout competition, the Chatham Cup on ten occasions. Their best performance came in the 1988 cup, when they reached the last 32 of the competition.

The club was formed in 1957 by a group of former school players, playing their home games at Burnside Park. They moved to their current home, Edgar MacIntosh Park in the 1960s. At the beginning of that decade, HSOB won promotion to CFA Division 1, at the time, the Canterbury region's top league. In 1968, the Southern League was formed, and HSOB was among its founder members.
