= North Shore United AFC =

North Shore United
- Full name: North Shore United Association Football Club
- Nickname: The Shore
- Founded: 1886; 140 years ago
- Ground: Allen Hill Stadium, Devonport, North Shore
- Chairman: Mike Fox
- Coach: Dave Fahy
- League: NRFL Championship
- 2026: NRFL Championship, 7th of 12
- Website: nsu.org.nz
Home colours	Away colours

North Shore United Association Football Club is an amateur football club based in the North Shore, Auckland. They compete in the NRFL Championship, after being relegated in 2022.

Their home ground is Allen Hill Stadium, which is located in the suburb of Devonport.

== History ==
Chart of yearly ladder positions for North Shore United in NZ 1st division soccer

The club was founded in 1886, making it the oldest football club in New Zealand and Oceania. North Shore United was originally formed as North Shore in 1886 and in 1933 amalgamated with Belmont, taking the present name.

As the result of a sponsorship deal with camera distributor Hanimex, the team was known from 1979 to 1985 as Hanimex United or, unofficially, as Hanimex North Shore United.

== Achievements ==
North Shore United is one of New Zealand's oldest and most successful football clubs. In addition to numerous provincial and regional titles, North Shore United won the National Soccer League in 1977, the New Zealand Superclub League in 1994 and finished as the runner-up three times (1975, 1982, 1983). North Shore United won the Northern Premier League in 2001 They also came runner-up in the Lotto Sport Italia NRFL Division 2 (2012), promoting them to the Lotto Sport Italia NRFL Division 1 the following season. The club was promoted to the NRFL Premier in 2018 as runners-up.

North Shore United also has a proud Chatham Cup record, having won the competition on six occasions in 1952 (shared), 1960, 1963, 1967, 1979, and 1986. They also finished as the runner-up six times in 1926 (as North Shore), 1959, 1961, 1973, 1985, and 1995. North Shore United reached the semi-finals of the 2021 competition, but decided to withdraw due to the risks posed by the COVID-19 pandemic.

== Players ==
Many prominent members of the New Zealand national football team have also played for North Shore United. These players include Jason Batty, Duncan Cole, Adrian Elrick, Mark Elrick, Robert Ironside, Darren McClennan, Ian Ormond, Heremaia Ngata, Wynton Rufer, Daniel Ellensohn and Keith Hobbs.

== Current squad ==
As of 11 May 2025

Note: Flags indicate national team as defined under FIFA eligibility rules; some limited exceptions apply. Players may hold more than one non-FIFA nationality.

No.	Pos.	Nation	Player
1	GK	NZL	Sam Kay
2	CB	NZL	Jack Gillum
3	CB	NZL	Max Breingan
4	CB	NZL	Harry Lissington (C)
5	CB	USA	Joshua Choice
6	CB	NZL	Joshua Wells
7	RW	NZL	James Marshall
8	CM	NZL	Joe Moore
9	ST	ENG	Adam Creaney
10	ST	CAN	Yusuf Olanrewaju Alade
11	ST	NZL	Louie Poletti
12	CB	NZL	Sam McQuay
13	RWB	NZL	Jakal Taylor

No.	Pos.	Nation	Player
14	LW	RWA	Brandon Gashema
15	RM	NZL	Lucas Richardson
16	CM	NZL	Jack Miles
17	RW	KOR	Hwi-seong Chang
18	CM	NZL	Ryan Singh
19	CAM	SOL	Andrew Abba
20	CM	NZL	Matti Longbottom
21	GK	NZL	Kees Hofma
22	LM	ARG	Tomas Gabriel Castro Pereyra
23	LW	NZL	Joseph Marshall
25	CB	NZL	Marcus Griffiths

== Season by season record ==
Season	League											Chatham Cup	Notes	Top scorer	
Season	Division	Tier	P	W	D	L	GF	GA	GD	Pts	Pos	Chatham Cup	Notes	Name	Goals
2027	NRFL Championship	2									TBD				

== Honours ==
- New Zealand National Soccer League (Level 1)
  - Champions (2): 1977, 1994
  - Runners-up: 1975, 1982, 1983
- Northern League (Level 2)
  - Champions (3): 1973, 2001, 2019
  - Runners-up: 1971
- Auckland provincial championship
  - Champions (14): 1902, 1906, 1916, 1918, 1919, 1922, 1923, 1938, 1947, 1954, 1959, 1960, 1961, 1963
- Chatham Cup
  - Champions (6): 1952 (shared), 1960, 1963, 1967, 1979, 1986
  - Runners-up: 1926, 1959, 1961, 1973, 1975, 1995
- Club of Pioneers member as of 2017

Chatham Cup
Preceded by Eastern Suburbs	Shared with Western*; 1952 Chatham Cup	Succeeded by Eastern Suburbs
Preceded by Northern	Winner; 1960 Chatham Cup	Succeeded by Northern
Preceded by Hamilton Technical Old Boys	Winner; 1963 Chatham Cup	Succeeded by Mount Roskill
Preceded by Miramar Rangers	Winner; 1967 Chatham Cup	Succeeded by Eastern Suburbs
Preceded by Manurewa	Winner; 1979 Chatham Cup	Succeeded by Mount Wellington
Preceded by Napier City Rovers	Winner; 1986 Chatham Cup	Succeeded by Gisborne City
