= New Brighton A.F.C. (New Zealand) =

New Brighton
- Full name: New Brighton Association Football Club
- Nickname: The Seasiders
- Founded: 1924 re-formed 1959
- Dissolved: 2007
- Ground: Bexley Park, Christchurch
- League: Mainland Premier League

New Brighton A.F.C. was a soccer club in Christchurch, New Zealand. The original New Brighton Association Football Club was founded in 1924 but went into hiatus eight years later. The club was re-founded 27 years later in 1959. In 2007 they merged with Rangers A.F.C. to form Coastal Spirit FC.

The team entered the second division of the new Southern League in 1968, winning the league to gain promotion to the top flight. The following season saw their best-ever performance in the Chatham Cup, with them reaching the final only to lose to Auckland's Eastern Suburbs AFC. 1971 saw the team win the championship, gaining them entry to the New Zealand National Soccer League. The competed in this league for six seasons, spending much of that time in the bottom half of the table. Their best finish was third in 1974. They were relegated from the league in 1977.

The club gained new clubrooms in Bexley Road in 1979, but they were demolished after the 2011 Christchurch earthquake.

== Prominent players ==
- Ken France
- Owen Nuttridge
- Alex Smith
- Graham Storer
