= Red Sox Manawatu =

- Full name: Red Sox Manawatu Sports Club
- Founded: 2004 under this name. Earliest member club dates to the 1920s
- Ground: Central Energy Trust Arena
- League: Manawatu Division 1
- 2024: Manawatu Division 1, 2nd of 9
Home colours

Red Sox Manawatu is an Association football and netball club in Palmerston North, New Zealand.

The club caters for men's, women's and youth football teams and women's netball teams.

Riverside RedSox is affiliated to Red Sox Manawatu and caters for junior boys and girls football.

== History ==
The Red Sox Manawatu history is a complicated one. The club having been formed by the gradual merger and name-changes of a multitude of teams from the Palmerston North area. The oldest of these clubs was Saint Andrew's, which was founded in the 1920s. St Andrew's joined forces with Palmerston City (formed in 1938 as Palmerston North Thistle) in 1971, continuing as Palmerston City until 1974, when the club changed its name to Manawatu United. This club became Manawatu AFC in 1992 upon its merger with Rose City – a club which had itself been formed via a merge. Manawatu AFC combined with Riverside Red Sox (a team formed from the 1998 merger of Riverside and Red Sox) in 2004.

Rose City had itself formed from the 1983 merger of Glen Carron and Kiwi United. Glen Carron had previously been known as Corinthian-Old Boys, a club founded in 1963 from the merger of Corinthians and Palmerston North Old Boys, the latter club having started its life as New Settlers FC in 1952.

== Club records ==
Many of the merged clubs which are part of the Red Sox Manawatu history have had prominent places in regional or national football.

Kiwi United reached the later rounds of the Chatham Cup on many occasions from the 1950s, reaching the 1973 Quarter-finals, as did Palmerston City in 1969.

Manawatu AFC played in the New Zealand National Soccer League from 2000 to 2003, and reached the Quarter-finals in 1997, 2001 and 2003.

Palmerston North Thistle also reached the Quarter-finals of the competition in 1967, and went one better to reach the Semi-finals in 1964, however they lost 3–1 to Mount Roskill.

Manawatu United played in the New Zealand National Soccer League in 1979 and from 1985 to 1988, and reached the Chatham Cup Quarter-finals in 1976.
