= Eastern Suburbs AFC =

New Zealand football club

Eastern Suburbs A.F.C.
- Full name: Eastern Suburbs Association Football Club
- Nickname: The Lilywhites
- Founded: 1934; 92 years ago
- Ground: Madills Farm
- Manager: Michael Built
- League: National League
- 2026: Northern League, 2nd of 12; National League, TBD
- Website: www.easternsuburbs.org.nz
Home colours	Away colours

Eastern Suburbs Association Football Club is an association football club based in the suburb of Kohimarama in Auckland, New Zealand. The club competes in the National League.

== Club history ==
Chart of yearly ladder positions for Eastern Suburbs in NZ 1st division soccer

Eastern Suburbs was formed in 1934 as a result of the merger of Tamaki United AFC (formed 1924) and Glen Innes (formed 1930). One of the country's strongest clubs, it has won all major honours in the country, including winning the prestigious national Chatham Cup on six occasions.

Eastern Suburbs Men's First Team is coached by Michael Built.

== Players ==
=== Current Men's squad ===
As of 20 March 2024

Note: Flags indicate national team as defined under FIFA eligibility rules; some limited exceptions apply. Players may hold more than one non-FIFA nationality.

No.	Pos.	Nation	Player
2	DF	NZL	Jackson Jarvie
3	DF	NZL	Tyler Lissette
4	DF	NZL	Kelvin Kalua
5	DF	NZL	Aaryan Raj
6	DF	NZL	Adam Thomas
7	DF	ESP	Roberto Alarcon
10	FW	NZL	Noah Karunaratne
14	MF	NZL	Campbell Strong
16	DF	NZL	Noah Billingsley

No.	Pos.	Nation	Player
17	FW	NZL	Ralph Rutherford
21	MF	NZL	Ryan Verney
23	MF	NZL	Sam Twigg
25	GK	NZL	Ernest (Big Ern) Wong
27	FW	NZL	Dylan Laing-McConnell
28	DF	NZL	Riley Dalziell
29	MF	NZL	James Mitchell
30	MF	JPN	Aoi Hamao

== Season by season record ==
Season	Qualifying league	League									National League									Chatham Cup	Top scorer	
Season	Qualifying league	P	W	D	L	F	A	GD	Pts	Pos	P	W	D	L	F	A	GD	Pts	Pos	Chatham Cup	Name	Goals
2021	Northern League	19	10	4	5	31	21	+10	34	3rd	Cancelled (Note: 2021 National League season cancelled due to COVID-19 pandemic in Northern regions. Championship played as South Central Series, with the northern clubs missing in the first edition.)									R4	(New Zealand) Jake Mechell	12
2022	Northern League	22	5	5	12	24	36	-12	20	10th	Did not qualify									2nd	(New Zealand) Michael Built, (Australia) Daniel Champness	4
2023	Northern League	22	17	5	0	51	17	+34	56	2nd	9	4	3	2	23	11	+12	15	4th	SF	(Uruguay) Martín Bueno	10
2024	Northern League	22	14	2	6	38	20	+18	44	3rd	9	1	2	6	8	17	−9	5	9th	R3	(New Zealand) Jacob Mechell	23
2025	Northern League	22	12	4	6	35	27	+8	40	5th	Did not qualify									SF	(Argentina) Eber Ramirez	6
2026	Northern League	22	14	5	3	41	9	+32	47	2nd	In progress									R2		

Season	League											Chatham Cup	Continental	Top scorer	
Season	Division	Tier	P	W	D	L	GF	GA	GD	Pts	Pos	Chatham Cup	Continental	Name	Goals
2027	National League	1									TBD				

	Champions
	Runners-up
	Third Place
♦	Top scorer in competition

== Performance in OFC competitions ==
Season	Competition	Round	Club	Home	Away	Position
2020 (Note: On 4 September 2020, OFC announced that the knockout stage was cancelled due to the COVID-19 pandemic.)	OFC Champions League	Group A	(Vanuatu) Galaxy	2–2		1st
2020	OFC Champions League	Group A	(Papua New Guinea) Hekari United	2–1		1st
2020	OFC Champions League	Group A	(New Caledonia) Hienghène Sport	4–0		1st

== Honours ==
- New Zealand National Football League
  - Champions (2): 1971, 2018–19
- Chatham Cup
  - Champions (6): 1951, 1953, 1965, 1968, 1969, 2015
- Northern Premier League
  - Champions (3): 1965, 1966, 2015
- Auckland FA
  - Champions (7): 1948, 1950, 1951, 1952, 1953, 1957, 1962

== Notes ==
Chatham Cup
Preceded by Eden	Winner; 1951 Chatham Cup	Succeeded by North Shore United and Western (Shared)
Preceded by North Shore United and Western (Shared)	Winner; 1953 Chatham Cup	Succeeded by Onehunga
Preceded by Mount Roskill	Winner; 1965 Chatham Cup	Succeeded by Miramar Rangers
Preceded by North Shore United	Winner; 1968 Chatham Cup	Succeeded by Eastern Suburbs
Preceded by Eastern Suburbs	Winner; 1969 Chatham Cup	Succeeded by Blockhouse Bay
Preceded by Cashmere Technical	Winner; 2015 Chatham Cup	Succeeded by Birkenhead United

Kate Sheppard Cup
Preceded by Dunedin Technical	Winner; 2019 Kate Sheppard Cup	Succeeded by 2020 Competition cancelled due COVID-19; 2021 Wellington United
