= Invercargill Thistle AFC =

Invercargill Thistle FC
- Full name: Thistle Football Club
- Nickname: Thistle
- Founded: 1936; 90 years ago
- Ground: ILT Football Turf, Invercargill
- Chairman: Dylan Meehan
- Coach: Richie Sutherland
- League: Southland Premier
- 2026: Southland Premier, 3rd of 6

Invercargill Thistle also known as Thistle FC is an established football club based in the South Island city of Invercargill. The team was founded in 1936 and currently have 13 teams from Men's premier, Women's, and Junior divisions. The club competes in the Southland Premier.

== History ==
During the 1960s Thistle was one of the southern South Island's stronger teams, reaching the semi-finals of the Chatham Cup on two occasions, in 1967 and 1969. The team spent one season in the New Zealand National Soccer League in 1982.

In the 2018 season the club currently run a team in the Southland premier Donald Gray competition, Division 1, and Division 2. They also have a team in the Sunday women's competition as well as a full complement of Junior teams.

Based out of Islington Street Invercargill, Thistle FC is the oldest and most successful club in Southland Football, having won the Southland Premier on 21 occasions.
