= Southern Football =

Federation of New Zealand Football

- Founded: 2000
- Headquarters: Logan Park
- Location: 20 Logan Park Drive, North Dunedin, Dunedin
- FIFA affiliation: New Zealand Football
- Chief Executive: Dougal McGowan
- Website: Official website

Southern Football, formerly FootballSouth, is one of six federations of New Zealand Football, representing regions of South Canterbury, Waitaki, Dunedin, Central Otago, Clutha and Southland.

== History ==
Southern United, formerly Soccersouth until 2007, was founded in 2002, to represent the region for the New Zealand Women's National League from its inaugural season in 2002 onwards.

Southern United, formerly Otago United until 2013, was founded in 2004 as a conglomerate of various Otago area clubs, in order to form a strong team to take part in the New Zealand Football Championship, run on a regional franchise basis, and Southern United became one of the eight competing teams. In 2021, the league was replaced by New Zealand National League for more of a club based competition, causing the Southern United Men's Team to dissolve.

== Competitions ==
Leagues

- Men's Leagues
  - Southern League
  - Southern Premier League
  - Fletcher Cup
  - South Canterbury Men's Division One
  - Donald Gray Memorial Cup
- Women's Leagues
  - South Island League
  - Southern Women's Championship League
  - Otago Women's Division One
  - South Canterbury Women's Division One
  - Kolk Cup Premier

Defunct Leagues

- Southern League Division One
- Southern League Division Two

Note: Southern League and South Island League includes teams from the Mainland Football Federation and is a National competition run by New Zealand Football and managed by Mainland Football.

== Title holders ==
Competition	Year	Champions	Runners-up	Next edition
Senior (Men's)
Southern League	2024	Cashmere Technical	Coastal Spirit	2025
Southern Premier League	2024	Mosgiel AFC	Wanaka	2025
Fletcher Cup	2024	Old Boys	Dunedin City Royals	2025
South Canterbury Men's Division One	2024	West End	Timaru Thistle	2025
Donald Gray Memorial Cup	2024	Queens Park	Gore Wanderers	2025
Senior (Women's)
South Island League	2024	Cashmere Technical	Dunedin City Royals	2025
Southern Women's Premiership League	2024	Green Island	Queens Park	2025
Otago Women's Division One	2024	Otago University 3rds	Balclutha	2025
South Canterbury Women's Division One	2023	Pleasant Point Women's	West End AFC Women's	—N/a
Kolk Cup Premier	2024	Thistle	Wyndham Town	2024

== Affiliated clubs ==
As of 2025.

Southern League Dunedin City Royals Northern Wanaka	Southern Premier League Green Island Mosgiel Northern Hearts Old Boys Otago University Queens Park Roslyn Wakari	Otago/Dunedin Al-Huda Alexandra United Awamoa Balclutha Cromwell Grants Braes Harbourside Maori Hill Meadowbank United Mornington Riverside Queenstown	South Canterbury Geraldine Pleasant Point Temuka Thistle Timaru City Timaru United Timaru Boys' HS Waimate West End	Southland Gore Wanderers Southend United Te Anau Thistle Waihopai Western Winton Wyndham Town

== See also ==
- New Zealand Football
- Northern Region Football
- WaiBOP Football
- Central Football
- Capital Football
- Mainland Football
- Association football in New Zealand
