= 2024 Southern Football Leagues =

Football championship leagues

Southern Football Leagues
- Season: 2024
- Dates: 29 March - 6 October
- Champions Men's Leagues Southern League (1) Southern Premiership League (2) Fletcher Cup (3) Donald Gray Memorial Cup (4) South Canterbury Men's Division 1 (5): Team Coastal Spirit (1); Mosgiel (2); Old Boys (3); Queens Park Reserves (4); West End (5)
- Women's Leagues South Island League (1) Women's Southern Premiership (2) Women's Combined Division One (3) Kolk Cup (4): Cashmere Technical (1); Green Island (2); Otago University Thirds (3); Thistle (4)
- Shield Blair Davidson Trophy: Mosgiel
- Number beside teams means what league the won, not how many times they have won it.

The 2024 Southern Football Leagues is the 25th season of football in the Southern Football federation. There are five main men's leagues and four main women's leagues. The main men's leagues are: Southern League, Southern Premiership, Fletcher Cup, Donald Gray Memorial Cup, and South Canterbury Division 1, respectively tier 2, 3, 4, 4 and 4 among New Zealand men's league system. The main women's leagues are: South Island League, Southern Premiership, Combined Division One, and Kolk Cup, respectively tier 2, 3, 4 and 4 among New Zealand women's league system.

The Men's Premiership league is sponsored by Otago Daily Times, the Fletcher Cup is sponsored by Southland Express, the Kolk Cup is sponsored by SBS Bank.

== Men's Competitions ==
=== Southern League ===
The 2024 Southern League is the 3rd season of a full 10 team league, 4th season all total. Ten teams will compete in the league – the nine teams from the previous season and the winner of the Southern League play-offs also being the 2023 Canterbury Premiership League champions. The promoted team is University of Canterbury, after winning 5–3 on aggregate against FC Nelson, then drawing 2–2 on aggregate against Roslyn-Wakari, with University of Canterbury won 6–5 on penalties. This is University of Canterbury's first season in the Southern League, they replaced Green Island after withdrawing at the end of the previous season, they spent three seasons in the league with their highest finish being 8th on all three occasions.

The Southern League sits above the Southern Premiership and is also overseen by Mainland Football and Southern Football, despite being run by New Zealand Football as part of the New Zealand National League regional phase.

==== Southern League table ====
Pos	Team	Pld	W	D	L	GF	GA	GD	Pts	Qualification
1	Cashmere Technical (C)	18	15	2	1	90	19	+71	47	Winner of Southern League and qualification to National League Championship
2	Coastal Spirit	18	14	3	1	59	17	+42	45	Qualification to National League Championship
3	Christchurch United	18	13	2	3	64	21	+43	41	
4	Nelson Suburbs	17	8	5	4	52	39	+13	29	
5	Ferrymead Bays	18	8	1	9	39	39	0	25	
6	Nomads United	18	7	3	8	27	31	−4	24	
7	Dunedin City Royals	17	6	1	10	27	46	−19	19	
8	Selwyn United	18	4	2	12	31	68	−37	14	
9	University of Canterbury	18	3	2	13	21	46	−25	11	
10	FC Twenty 11 (R)	18	0	1	17	9	93	−84	1	Relegated to Canterbury Premiership

Source: Mainland Football
Rules for classification: 1) Points; 2) Goal difference; 3) Goals scored; 4) Goals against; 5) Head to head; 6) Disciplinary record; 7) Coin toss
(C) Champions; (R) Relegated

==== Southern League play-off series ====
The final of the Southern League play-off series is a two-legged match that take place between the Mainland Football nominated club and Southern Football nominated club. The winner of the Mainland Football play-off will face the Southern Football nominated club, Wanaka. Wanaka came second in the 2024 Southern Premiership League, with champions Mosgiel, declining to participate for the second year in a row. None of the clubs in the Southern League play-off series have previously participated in the Southern League.

Overview

Team 1	Agg.	Team 2	1st leg	2nd leg
Wanaka (S)	9–4	Waimakariri United (C)	5–1	4–3

Matches – Southern League Playoff Series

28 September 2024 Leg 1	Wanaka	5 – 1	Waimakariri United	Wānaka
3:30 pm	Sippola 36' (yellow card) 45'; Brum 39'; Fielding (yellow card) 56'; S. Sprowson 65', 90'; Plimmer 83'	Report	Vialoux 71'; McCleary (yellow card) 36'; Quigley (yellow card) 42'	Stadium: Recreation Centre; Referee: Nikolay Shevlyakov

6 October 2024 Leg 2	Waimakariri United	3 – 4	Wanaka	Kaiapoi
2:45 pm	Kambai 54'; Ribeiro De Abreu 73', 90'	Report	Sippola 63'; Plimmer 70', 83'; A. Sprowson 85'	Stadium: Kendal Park; Referee: Ralph Clink

=== Southern Premiership League ===
Southern Premiership League
- Season: 2024
- Dates: 6 April - 7 September
- Champions: Mosgiel
- Promoted: Wanaka
- Relegated: Queenstown
- Matches: 90
- Goals: 391 (4.34 per match)
- Top goalscorer: Rhys Quarrell (27 goals)
- Biggest home win: Mosgiel 11–0 Northern Hearts (17 August 2024)
- Biggest away win: Queenstown 0–10 Mosgiel (22 June 2024)
- Highest scoring: Mosgiel 11–0 Northern Hearts (17 August 2024)

The 2024 Southern Premiership League is the 25th season of premiership football in the region. The League started on 6 April and finishes on 7 September, with the competition being a double round robin. Each team can field a maximum of five foreign players as well as one additional foreign player who has Oceania Football Confederation nationality. Temporary Dismissals will be in use for when a player commits a cautionable offence that is relevant to dissent and the length of the dismissal is 10 minutes starting from when play restarts.

At the end of season, the highest ranked team will be nominated to play in a Southern League Playoff series, two-leg home and away series, against the winner of the Mainland Football Federation Playoffs. The Mainland Playoffs consists of the highest ranked nominated team from Canterbury Premiership League and Nelson Bays Premiership League. The winner of Southern League Playoff will be promoted to Southern League, assuming they will have the correct club licensing before the season starts.

==== Southern Premiership teams ====
Ten teams are competing in the league – all ten clubs from the previous season. Green Island's reserve team were relegated due to their first team withdrawing from the 2024 Southern League, as per the regulations stating that only one team per club is allowed in the league, the reserve team will play in the Fletcher Cup.

Team	Location	Home Ground	2023 season
Dunedin City Royals Reserves	Caledonian Ground	Dunedin North	8th
Green Island	Sunnyvale Park	Green Island	8th in Southern League (Relegated)
Mosgiel	Memorial Park Ground	Mosgiel	1st
Northern	Forrester Park	North East Valley	3rd
Northern Hearts	Aorangi Stadium	Timaru	10th
Otago University	Dunedin Artificial Turf	Dunedin North	7th
Queens Park	Surrey Park	Invercargill	5th
Queenstown	Queenstown Events Centre Stadium	Queenstown	9th
Roslyn-Wakari	Ellis Park	Kaikorai Valley	2nd
Wanaka	Wanaka Recreation Centre	Wānaka	4th

==== Southern Premiership personnel ====
Team	Manager	Captain
Dunedin City Royals Reserves	(New Zealand) Damon Moss	(England) Michael Neaverson
Green Island	(New Zealand) Jared White	(New Zealand) Sam Dore
Mosgiel	(New Zealand) Max Frear	(New Zealand) Rory Findlay
Northern	(New Zealand) Arran Wilkinson	(New Zealand) Cameron McPhail
Northern Hearts	Matthew Chambers	Kevin McLaughlin
Otago University	Robert Mitchell	Ben Campbell
Queens Park	Patrick Murphy	Ryo Okuyama
Queenstown	Danniel Bocatios	Cameron McCracken
Roslyn-Wakari	(New Zealand) Kris Ridley	Shay Thom
Wanaka	(Netherlands) Thomas van Hees	(New Zealand) Josh Shackelton

==== Southern Premiership table ====
Pos	Team	Pld	W	D	L	GF	GA	GD	Pts	Qualification
1	Mosgiel (C)	18	15	1	2	76	18	+58	46	Winners of Southern Premiership
2	Wanaka (O, P)	18	10	4	4	47	22	+25	34	Qualification to Southern League play-offs (Note: If highest ranked first team; doesn't nominate themselves to be considered for promotion or decline participation for the playoffs, the second highest ranked first team is nominated)
3	Northern	18	10	2	6	49	33	+16	32	
4	Otago University	18	9	4	5	33	33	0	31	
5	Dunedin City Royals Reserves (Note: Unable to be promoted to Southern League due to already having a side in the Southern League; therefore are ineligible to be considered for the 'Playoff Series'.)	18	8	5	5	50	34	+16	29	
6	Roslyn-Wakari	18	8	4	6	38	32	+6	28	
7	Green Island	18	6	3	9	35	48	−13	21	
8	Queens Park	18	6	2	10	30	40	−10	20	
9	Northern Hearts	18	2	5	11	21	50	−29	11	
10	Queenstown (R)	18	0	2	16	12	81	−69	2	Qualification for relegation play-offs

Source: Southern Football, Fiji Football
Rules for classification: 1) Points; 2) Goal difference; 3) Goals scored; 4) Head to Head; If tied at end of season; Play-off Match
(C) Champions; (O) Play-off winners; (P) Promoted; (R) Relegated

==== Southern Premiership results table ====
Home \ Away	DCR	GIL	MOS	NOR	NHT	OTU	QPK	QTN	RWK	WAN
Dunedin City Royals Reserves		3–0	1–4	3–3	1–1	2–1	1–1	6–0	2–3	0–2
Green Island	2–2		0–9	4–3	1–1	3–4	3–1	7–0	3–2	1–1
Mosgiel	4–4	2–1		4–4	11–0	1–2	4–3	3–0 (Note: Queenstown defaulted, 3–0 win for Mosgiel)	5–0	2–1
Northern	2–4	2–0	3–1		3–1	3–3	5–2	7–0	2–1	0–1
Northern Hearts	1–4	3–4	1–3	1–5		2–1	2–2	1–1	1–2	1–1
Otago University	1–0	4–1	0–5	3–2	2–1		2–1	4–2	1–1	0–4
Queens Park	3–4	2–0	1–3	0–3	2–0	1–2		3–2	2–1	1–4
Queenstown	1–7	4–1	0–10	0–2	1–4	1–1	0–1		0–4	1–4
Roslyn-Wakari	1–4	1–0	1–4	3–0	4–0	2–2	4–1	4–1		1–1
Wanaka	4–2	6–2	0–1	2–4	2–0	1–0	0–3	10–0	3–3	

Source: Southern Football, Fiji Football
Legend: Blue = home team win; Yellow = draw; Red = away team win.

==== Southern Premiership relegation play-off ====
The Southern Premiership relegation play-off was a one-legged match that took place between the Southern Premiership's bottom placed club and Fletcher Cup's winners. The bottom placed team of the Southern Premiership league, Queenstown, will face the Fletcher Cup winners, Old Boys. The winner of the Donald Gray Memorial Cup was meant to play the winner of the Fletcher Cup in a play-off match, but due to the winner, Queens Park, already having a team in the league and second placed Gore Wanderers declining by having no ambitions for promotion to the Southern Premiership, the first play-off game got canceled.

Overview

Team 1	Score	Team 2
Queenstown (S)	2–0	Old Boys (F)

Matches – Southern Premiership relegation play-off

14 September 2024 Final	Queenstown	0 – 2	Old Boys	Cromwell
2:00 pm	Llanos (yellow card) 50'	Report	Tull 61', 84'; Edson (yellow card) 88'	Stadium: Alpha Street; Referee: Gary Boyles

==== Blair Davidson Trophy ====
The Blair Davidson Trophy is a Challenge Shield, where any team can challenge for the shield. It is only up for challenge when the current holders plays a league home game, cups competitions aren't challenge games. The season started with Green Island holding the trophy, before Mosgiel took the trophy off them. Mosgiel defended it against Wanaka, losing it to Otago University. Otago University went on to defend it against Dunedin City Royals Reserves and Green Island, then Wanaka won it. Wanaka's shield defence didn't last long as Mosgiel won it back. Mosgiel went on to defend it for the rest of the season with comfortable wins against Roslyn Wakari and Northern Hearts. Mosgiel's last defense match against Queenstown got cancelled as Queenstown defaulted the match.

The Blair Davidson Trophy current holders are Mosgiel, who defeated Wanaka 0–1 in the 12th round to claim the shield. They have defended the trophy twice, once against Roslyn Wakari and once against Northern Hearts.

===== Blair Davidson Trophy Matches =====
Match 1

13 April 2024 Round 2	Green Island	0 – 9	Mosgiel	Green Island
2:45 pm	Evans (yellow card) 32'; Milton (yellow card) 35'	Report	Quarrell 15', 30', 90'; Findlay 23'; Thompson 26'; Reynolds 33'; Duncan 84', 89'; Stephens 88'	Stadium: Sunnyvale Park; Referee: Wayne Van Gorp

Match 2

20 April 2024 Round 3	Mosgiel	2 – 1	Wanaka	Mosgiel
2:45 pm	Findlay 6' (pen.) (yellow card) 33'; Day (yellow card) 61'; Burthenshaw 71'; Quarrell (yellow card) 90'	Report	Carmichael 29'	Stadium: Memorial Park Ground; Referee: Caleb Marsh

Match 3

4 May 2024 Round 5	Mosgiel	1 – 2	Otago University	Mosgiel
2:45 pm	Reynolds (yellow card) 38'; Findlay (yellow card) 53'; Duncan 90'	Report	Campbell 39' (pen.); Crowe (yellow card) 85'; Davidson 90'	Stadium: Memorial Park Ground; Referee: Wayne Van Gorp

Match 4

18 May 2024 Round 6	Otago University	1 – 0	Dunedin City Royals Reserves	Dunedin North
3:00 pm	Campbell (yellow card) 10'; Hodson 65'	Report	Caldwell (yellow card) 38'; Thompson (yellow card) 90'	Stadium: Football Turf; Referee: Wayne Van Gorp

Match 5

8 June 2024 Round 8	Otago University	4 – 1	Green Island	Dunedin North
3:00 pm	Clegg 11'; Crowe (yellow card) 36' (goal) 81'; Mitchell 48'; Campbell (yellow card) 52'; Murra 68'; Mirzaee Porkoli (yellow card) 87'	Report	McLean 21'; Dore (yellow card) 24'; Milton (yellow card) 47'; Smith (yellow card) 59'; Kelly (red card) 59'	Stadium: Football Turf; Referee: Caleb Marsh

Match 6

29 June 2024 Round 10	Otago University	0 – 4	Wanaka	Dunedin North
3:00 pm		Report	Sippola (yellow card) 26' (goal) 52'; Brum 34', 59' (yellow card) 58'; Arratia 43'	Stadium: Football Turf; Referee: Gary Boyles

Match 7

20 July 2024 Round 12	Wanaka	0 – 1	Mosgiel	Wānaka
2:45 pm	Sippola (yellow card) 38' (yellow-red card) 41'	Report	Walecki (yellow card) 36'; Burtenshaw 47'	Stadium: Recreation Centre; Referee: Aaron Collins

Match 8

27 July 2024 Round 13	Mosgiel	5 – 0	Roslyn Wakari	Mosgiel
2:45 pm	Findlay 17'; Quarrell 24', 27'; Clissold 76', 90'	Report	Smith (yellow card) 74'	Stadium: Memorial Park Ground; Referee: Calvin-kei Berg

Match 9

17 August 2024 Round 16	Mosgiel	11 – 0	Northern Hearts	Mosgiel
2:45 pm	Duncan 8', 45'; Burtenshaw 27', 28', 32', 47', 53'; Findlay 34'; Quarrell 76'; Maze 90'	Report		Stadium: Memorial Park Ground; Referee: Bruce James

Match 10

31 August 2024 Round 18	Mosgiel	w/o Queenstown defaulted the match	Queenstown	Mosgiel
		Report		Stadium: Memorial Park Ground; Referee: Dan Woulahan

==== Southern Premiership scoring ====
As of 7 September 2024

===== Southern Premiership top scorers =====
Rank	Player	Club	Goals
1	Rhys Quarrell	Mosgiel	27
2	Rory Hibbert	Northern	17
2	Nathan Wilkie	Roslyn Wakari	17
4	Lucas Townend	Dunedin City Royals Reserves	16
5	Tyler Muir	Northern	13
6	Bailey Chambers	Northern Hearts	12
7	Ethan Arratia	Wanaka	10
7	Reece Burtenshaw	Mosgiel	10
7	Sam Cosgrove	Northern	10
7	George Duncan	Mosgiel	10

===== Southern Premiership hat-tricks =====
Round	Player	For	Against	Home/Away	Result	Date
1	Tyler Muir	Northern	Queenstown	Home	7–0	6 April 2024
2	Lewis Wall	Roslyn Wakari	Wanaka	Away	3–3	12 April 2024
2	Rhys Quarrell	Mosgiel	Green Island	Away	0–9	12 April 2024
4	Ben Campbell	Otago University	Queenstown	Home	4–2	27 April 2024
8	Nathan Wilkie	Roslyn Wakari	Queenstown	Home	4–1	8 June 2024
9	Rhys Quarrell (Note: Player scored 8 goals)	Mosgiel	Queenstown	Away	0–10	13 June 2024
10	Rhys Quarrell	Mosgiel	Dunedin City Royals Reserves	Away	1–4	29 June 2024
13	Lucas Townend (Note: Player scored 4 goals)	Dunedin City Royals Reserves	Queens Park	Away	3–4	27 July 2024
14	Connor Neil	Dunedin City Royals Reserves	Queenstown	home	6–0	3 August 2024
16	Reece Burtenshaw (Note: Player scored 5 goals)	Mosgiel	Northern Hearst	Home	11–0	17 August 2024
16	Ethan Arratia	Wanaka	Queenstown	Home	10–0	17 August 2024
17	Rory Hibbert	Northern	Northern Hearts	Away	1–5	24 August 2024
17	Nathan Wilkie	Roslyn Wakari	Queenstown	Away	0–4	24 August 2024
18	Lucas Townend	Dunedin City Royals Reserves	Roslyn Wakari	Away	1–4	31 August 2024
18	Rory Hibbert	Northern	Queens Park	Home	5–2	1 September 2024

===== Southern Premiership own goals =====
Round	Player	Club	H/A	Time	Goal	Result	Opponent	Date
1	Sören Von Loh	Queenstown	Away	60'	5–0	7–0	Northern	6 April 2024
2	Cameron McCracken	Queenstown	Away	81'	1–1	1–1	Northern Hearts	13 April 2024
5	Josh Lucas	Queenstown	Away	58'	5–0	7–0	Green Island	18 May 2024
6	Jorge Antonio Pun Perez	Roslyn Wakari	Away	19'	2–0	2–1	Northern	4 May 2024
7	Alex Wilson	Wanaka	Away	26'	1–2	1–4	Queenstown	25 May 2024
7	Sam Dore	Green Island	Away	17'	1–0	3–0	Dunedin City Royals Reserves	25 May 2024
11	Rayn Walden	Queenstown	Home	26'	0–2	1–4	Queenstown	13 July 2024
11	Angus Brett	Northern	Home	30'	0–2	2–4	Dunedin City Royals Reserves	13 July 2024
12	Sam Dore	Green Island	Home	66'	1–3	4–3	Northern	20 July 2024
13	Conor White	Northern Hearts	Away	11'	1–0	2–0	Wanaka	3 August 2024
17	Joseph Renwick	Dunedin City Royals Reserves	Home	74'	0–2	0–2	Wanaka	24 August 2024

=== Fletcher Cup League ===
Fletcher Cup
- Season: 2024
- Dates: 6 April - 31 August
- Champions: Old Boys
- Promoted: Old Boys
- Matches: 84
- Goals: 348 (4.14 per match)
- Top goalscorer: Toby Orchiston (17 goals)
- Biggest home win: Old Boys 7–0 Grants Braes (27 July 2024)
- Biggest away win: Dunedin City Royals Thirds 1–7 Northern Reserves (11 May 2024)
- Highest scoring: Otago University Reserves 6–3 Grants Braes (20 July 2024); Northern Reserves 6–3 Otago University Reserves (27 July 2024)

The 2024 Fletcher Cup is the 7th season of championship football in the Otago region. The League started on 6 April and finished on 31 August, with league format being a double round robin.

==== Fletcher Cup teams ====
Team	Location	Home Ground	2023 season
Dunedin City Royals Thirds	Caledonian Ground	Dunedin North	1st
Grants Braes	Ocean Grove Sportsground	Ocean Grove	7th
Green Island Reserves	Sunnyvale Park	Green Island	6th in Southern Premier League (Relegated)
Mosgiel Reserves	Memorial Park Ground	Mosgiel	4th
Northern Reserves	Forrester Park	North East Valley	2nd
Old Boys	Waverley Park	Invercargill	1st in Donald Gray Memorial Cup (Moved)
Otago University Reserves	Football Turf	Dunedin North	3rd
Roslyn-Wakari Reserves	Ellis Park	Kaikorai Valley	5th

==== Fletcher Cup table ====
Pos	Team	Pld	W	D	L	GF	GA	GD	Pts	Promotion or relegation
1	Old Boys (O, P)	21	13	4	4	53	34	+19	43	Winneres of Fletcher Cup and qualification for promotion play-offs
2	Dunedin City Royals Thirds	21	13	3	5	51	30	+21	42	
3	Northern Reserves	21	12	3	6	74	40	+34	39	
4	Mosgiel Reserves	21	10	4	7	41	41	0	34	
5	Roslyn Wakari Reserves	21	10	2	9	36	36	0	32	
6	Green Island Reserves	21	9	3	9	40	39	+1	30	
7	Otago University Reserves	21	5	3	13	41	55	−14	18	
8	Grants Braes	21	0	2	19	12	73	−61	2	Relegation to Southern Men's Division 2

Source: Southern Football, Fiji Football
Rules for classification: 1) Points; 2) Goal difference; 3) Goals scored; 4) Head to Head; If tied at end of season; Play-off Match
(O) Play-off winners; (P) Promoted

==== Fletcher Cup results table ====
Home \ Away	DCR	GBS	GIL	MOS	NOR	OBS	OTU	RWK	DCR	GBS	GIL	MOS	NOR	OBS	OTU	RWK
Dunedin City Royals Thirds		3–0	3–1	1–2	1–7	1–1	4–0	1–3			1–1		2–2	4–1	3–1	
Grants Braes	0–2		3–0	0–4	0–5	0–5	0–2	0–0	2–3				0–3			2–3
Green Island Reserves	0–3	5–2		2–4	2–6	2–2	3–0 (Note: Otago University Reserves defaulted the match)	3–2		6–1		0–3		1–0		1–0
Mosgiel Reserves	0–5	2–0	1–0		2–2	3–4	3–3	1–2	1–0	2–1						3–1
Northern Reserves	3–4	5–1	5–2	5–1		4–4	1–4	2–4			0–2	6–1			6–3	
Old Boys	1–4	1–0	2–1	0–0	2–1		2–0	2–3		7–0		4–3	2–1			
Otago University Reserves	0–2	6–0	3–2	2–2	0–3	3–4		0–2		6–3	1–1	2–3		2–5		2–4
Roslyn Wakari Reserves	1–4	0–0	0–2	1–0	2–6	1–2	2–1		3–0				1–2	1–2		

Source: Southern Football, Fiji Football
Legend: Blue = home team win; Yellow = draw; Red = away team win.

==== Fletcher Cup scoring ====
As of 31 August 2024

===== Fletcher Cup top scorers =====
Rank	Player	Club	Goals
1	Toby Orchiston	Northern Reserves	17
2	Aaron Fernadez Caceres	Old Boys	12
3	Nicholas Brett	Northern Reserves	9
3	Ben Clixby	Old Boys	9
3	Timothy Cook	Dunedin City Royals Thirds	9
3	Jack Smith	Northern Reserves	9
7	Aaron Hartnell	Mosgiel Reserves	8
7	Torsten Wilkinson	Northern Reserves	8
9	Giovanni Pribaz	Roslyn Wakari Reserves	7
10	Harrison Brokenshire	Mosgiel Reserves	6
10	Salomon Fernadez Caceres	Old Boys	6

===== Fletcher Cup hat-tricks =====
Round	Player	For	Against	Home/Away	Result	Date
3	Timothy Cook	Dunedin City Royals Thirds	Roslyn Wakari Reserves	Away	1–4	20 April 2024
6	Torsten Wilkinson	Northern Reserves	Dunedin City Royals Thirds	Away	1–7	11 May 2024
8	Giovanni Pribaz	Roslyn Wakari Reserves	Northern Reserves	Away	2–4	25 May 2024
10	Toby Orchiston	Northern Reserves	Grants Braes	Home	5–1	8 June 2024
16	Toby Orchiston	Northern Reserves	Otago University Reserves	Home	6–3	27 July 2024
16	Ben Clixby	Old Boys	Grants Braes	Home	7–0	27 July 2024
18	Matthew Adye	Dunedin City Royals Thirds	Otago University Reserves	Home	3–1	9 August 2024

===== Fletcher Cup own goals =====
Round	Player	Club	H/A	Time	Goal	Result	Opponent	Date
10	Xavier Wright	Mosgiel Reserves	Home	58'	3–2	3–3	Otago University Reserves	8 June 2024
12	Rowan Bell	Green Island Reserves	Home	61'	1–5	2–6	Northern Reserves	22 June 2024
17	Joshua Child	Grants Braes	Home	67'	0–3	0–3	Northern Reserves	3 August 2024

=== Donald Gray Memorial Cup League ===
Donald Gray Memorial Cup
- Season: 2024
- Dates: 13 April - 4 September
- Champions: Queens Park Reserves
- Matches: 40
- Goals: 204 (5.1 per match)
- Biggest home win: Gore Wanderers 12–0 Waihopai (13 July 2024)
- Biggest away win: Waihopai 0–10 Gore Wanderers (18 May and 14 August 2024)
- Highest scoring: Gore Wanderers 12–0 Waihopai (13 July 2024)

The 2024 Donald Gray Memorial Cup is the 75th season of premiership football in the Southland Region. The Leagues starts on 13 April and finishes on 31 August, with the competition being a quadruple round robin.

==== Donald Gray teams ====
Five teams are competing in the league.

Team	Home Ground	Location	2023 season
Gore Wanderers	Hyde Park	Gore	4th
Old Boys Reserves	Waverley Park	Waverley, Invercargill	1st
Queens Park Reserves	Surrey Park	Glengarry, Invercargill	3rd
Thistle	ILT Football Turf	Invercargill	2nd
Waihopai	Surrey Park	Glengarry, Invercargill	—

==== Donald Gray table ====
Pos	Team	Pld	W	D	L	GF	GA	GD	Pts	Qualification
1	Queens Park Reserves	16	13	1	2	43	17	+26	40	Winners of Donald Gray Cup and Possible Promotion to Southern Premiership League
2	Gore Wanderers	16	10	1	5	63	20	+43	31	
3	Thistle	16	9	2	5	54	26	+28	29	
4	Old Boys Reserves	16	5	1	10	36	39	−3	16	
5	Waihopai	16	0	1	15	8	102	−94	1	

Source: Southland Football, Fiji Football
Rules for classification: 1) Points; 2) Goal difference; 3) Goals scored; 4) Head to Head; If tied at end of season; Play-off Match

==== Donald Gray results table ====
Home \ Away	GWS	OBS	QPK	THS	WAI	GWS	OBS	QPK	THS	WAI
Gore Wanderers		2–1	5–0	2–2	6–1		2–1	0–1	3–4	12–0
Old Boys Reserves	1–3		1–4	2–0	6–1	1–3		0–1	1–6	9–1
Queens Park Reserves	2–1	3–2		1–2	7–0	2–0	3–0		2–1	3–1
Thistle	2–1	5–2	1–4		6–0	2–3	2–3	2–2		9–0
Waihopai	0–10	0–3	1–2	0–3		0–10	3–3	0–6	0–7	

Source: Southland Football, Fiji Football
Legend: Blue = home team win; Yellow = draw; Red = away team win.

==== Donald Gray scoring ====
As of 4 September 2024

===== Donald Gray top scorers =====
Rank	Player	Club	Goals
1	Jose Mojica Rodriguez	Thistle	15
2	Ashton Wadsworth	Gore Wanderers	14
3	Sam Christie	Old Boys Reserves	12
4	Rithvy Riyaan Goundar	Gore Wanderers	11
5	Jesús Castillo	Thistle	7
6	Nshuti Honore	Thistle	6
6	Brayan Ocoro Orobio	Queens Park Reserves	6
6	Ganesh Thapa	Queens Park Reserves	6
9	Zac Owen Gear	Queens Park Reserves	5
9	Roy Gibson	Gore Wanderers	5
9	Sobur Omoyajowo	Thistle	5
9	Benjamin Paterson	Queens Park Reserves	5
9	Matthew Winkel	Gore Wanderers	5

===== Donald Gray hat-tricks =====
Round	Player	For	Against	Home/Away	Result	Date
1	Jose Mojica Rodriguez	Thistle	Old Boys Reserves	Home	5–2	13 April 2024
2	Paddy McMyler	Gore Wanderers	Old Boys Reserves	Away	1–3	20 April 2024
5	Zac Owen Gear	Queens Park Reserves	Old Boys Reserves	Away	1–4	17 May 2024
5	Roy Gibson	Gore Wanderers	Waihopai	Away	0–10	18 May 2024
7	Jose Mojica Rodriguez	Thistle	Waihopai	Home	6–0	29 May 2024
11	Frank de Jong	Gore Wanderers	Queens Park Reserves	Home	5–0	29 June 2024
13	Ben Rea	Gore Wanderers	Waihopai	Home	12–0	13 July 2024
13	Ashton Wadsworth	Gore Wanderers	Waihopai	Home	12–0	13 July 2024
15	Sam Christie	Old Boys Reserves	Waihopai	Home	9–1	24 July 2024
17	Jose Mojica Rodriguez	Thistle	Waihopai	Home	9–0	10 August 2024
18	Ashton Wadsworth	Gore Wanderers	Waihopai	Away	0–10	17 August 2024

===== Donald Gray own goals =====
Round	Player	Club	H/A	Time	Goal	Result	Opponent	Date
4	Neil McAra	Waihopai	Home	23'	1–1	1–1	Queens Park Reserves	4 May 2024
15	Shane Harpur	Waihopai	Away	82'	9–1	9–1	Old Boys Reserves	24 July 2024
17	Arron Yaxley	Waihopai	Away	6'	1–0	9–0	Thistle	10 August 2024

=== South Canterbury Men's Division 1 ===
South Canterbury Men's Division 1
- Season: 2024
- Dates: 6 April - 27 July
- Champions: West End
- Matches: 45
- Goals: 201 (4.47 per match)
- Biggest home win: Thistle 5–0 Northern Hearts Reserves (8 June 2024)
- Biggest away win: Pleasant Point 0–5 Geraldine (4 May 2024); Northern Hearts Reserves 0–5 West End (13 July 2024)
- Highest scoring: West End 5–6 Timaru Boys' High School (4 May 2024)

The Leagues starts on 6 April and finishes on 27 July, with the competition being a treble round robin.

==== South Canterbury teams ====
Six teams are competing in the league.

Team	Location	Home Ground
Geraldine	Geraldine Oval	Geraldine
Northern Hearts Reserves	Aorangi Park	Glenwood, Timaru
Pleasant Point	Pleasant Point	Pleasant Point
Timaru Boys' High School	Windsor Field	West End, Timaru
Thistle	Anzac Square	Parkside, Timaru
West End	West End	West End, Timaru

==== South Canterbury table ====
Pos	Team	Pld	W	D	L	GF	GA	GD	Pts	Qualification
1	West End (C)	15	11	2	2	50	22	+28	35	Winners of South Canterbury Men's Division 1 and Possible Promotion to Southern Premiership League
2	Thistle	15	9	1	5	39	31	+8	28	
3	Geraldine	15	7	3	5	31	25	+6	24	
4	Northern Hearts Reserves	15	4	2	9	26	48	−22	14	
5	Timaru Boys' High School	15	3	4	8	28	34	−6	13	
6	Pleasant Point	15	3	4	8	27	41	−14	13	Relegation to South Canterbury Men's Division 2

Source: Southern Football, Fiji Football
Rules for classification: 1) Points; 2) Goal difference; 3) Goals scored; 4) Head to Head; If tied at end of season; Play-off Match
(C) Champions

==== South Canterbury results table ====
Home \ Away	GER	NHT	PPT	TBS	THS	WED	GER	NHT	PPT	TBS	THS	WED
Geraldine		1–4	3–0	4–3	3–0	1–1		0–1		1–1	2–4	
Northern Hearts Reserves	1–2		1–5	3–1	2–3	3–6			2–3	1–1		0–5
Pleasant Point	0–5	1–3		2–3	0–3	1–1	1–1					3–5
Timaru Boys' High School	3–0	2–0	1–1		1–2	0–1			4–5		2–4	
Thistle	1–5	5–0	5–2	1–0		1–2		4–2	3–3			
West End	1–2	0–0	1–0	5–6	5–2		4–1			2–0	2–1	

Source: Southern Football, Fiji Football
Legend: Blue = home team win; Yellow = draw; Red = away team win.

==== South Canterbury scoring ====
As of 27 July 2024

===== South Canterbury hat-tricks =====
Round	Player	For	Against	Home/Away	Result	Date
9	Carter West	Thistle	Northern Hearts Reserves	Home	5–0	8 June 2024

===== South Canterbury own goals =====
Round	Player	Club	H/A	Time	Goal	Result	Opponent	Date
2	Aidan Cornelius	Timaru Boys High School	Home	18'	0–1	1–2	Thistle	13 April 2024
10	Jamie Walters	Northern Hearts Reserves	Home	85'	2–3	2–3	Pleasant Point	15 June 2024
14	Andrew Mehrtens	Northern Hearts Reserves	Away	83'	4–2	4–2	Thistle	20 July 2024

== Women's Qualifying Competitions ==
=== South Island Qualifying League ===
The SF Women's Southern Qualifying League is to determine the top two teams in Southern's federation, with the third-placed team playing in a playoff against the fourth-placed team in Mainland Qualifying, who go on to play the top three teams from Mainland Football. The bottom teams will play in the Women's Premiership, starting after this league finishes. They will be joined by the top teams from the Women's Division One League.

Six team are competing in the leagues - five teams from last year from last season and one promoted team. The promoted team is Queens Park. They are competing in the league, replacing Mosgiel and Queenstown.

==== South Island Qualifying League table ====
Pos	Team	Pld	W	D	L	GF	GA	GD	Pts	Qualification
1	Dunedin City Royals (C)	5	5	0	0	26	0	+26	15	Champions and qualification to South Island League
2	Otago University	5	4	0	1	13	4	+9	12	Qualification to South Island League
3	Roslyn-Wakari	5	3	0	2	23	4	+19	9	Qualification to South Island League Playoffs
4	Queens Park	5	2	0	3	8	11	−3	6	Qualification to Southern Football Women's Championship
5	Green Island	5	1	0	4	4	27	−23	3	Qualification to Southern Football Women's Championship
6	Northern	5	0	0	5	1	29	−28	0	Qualification to Southern Football Women's Championship

Source: Southern Football
Rules for classification: 1) Points; 2) Goal difference; 3) Goals scored; 4) Goals against; 5) Head to head; 6) Disciplinary record; 7) Coin toss
(C) Champions

==== South Island League play-offs ====
8 June 2024	Roslyn Wakari	1–0	University of Canterbury	Aorangi Park, Timaru
13:30	Body 90+5'

=== Women's Division One ===
Women's Division One (Billie Scott Cup)
- Season: 2024
- Dates: 27 April - 25 May
- Champions: Otago University Reserves
- Matches: 15
- Goals: 82 (5.47 per match)

==== Women's Division One teams ====
Six teams are competing in the league.

Team	Home Ground	Location
Dunedin City Royals Reserves	Culling Park	St Kilda
Grants Braes	Ocean Grove Sportsground	Ocean Grove
Mosgiel	Memorial Park Ground	Mosgiel
Otago University Reserves	Logan Park	Dunedin North
Otago University Thirds	Logan Park	Dunedin North
Roslyn Wakari Reserves	Multiple	Multiple

==== Women's Division One table ====
Pos	Team	Pld	W	D	L	GF	GA	GD	Pts	Qualification
1	Otago University Reserves	5	5	0	0	22	2	+20	15	Winners of Billie Scott Cup
2	Dunedin City Royals Reserves	5	4	0	1	23	8	+15	12	
3	Otago University Thirds	5	3	0	2	17	7	+10	9	
4	Roslyn Wakari Reserves	5	1	1	3	13	15	−2	4	
5	Grants Braes	5	1	1	3	6	22	−16	4	
6	Mosgiel	5	0	0	5	1	28	−27	0	

Source: Southern Football, Fiji Football
Rules for classification: 1) Points; 2) Goal difference; 3) Goals scored; All teams declared winners

==== Women's Division One results table ====
Home \ Away	DCR	GBS	MOS	OU2	OU3	RWK
Dunedin City Royals Reserves				2–5		5–2
Grants Braes	0–8		2–0	0–7		
Mosgiel	1–7				0–7	
Otago University Reserves			5–0		2–0	
Otago University Thirds	0–1	5–2				3–0
Roslyn Wakari Reserves		2–2	7–0		2–5	

Source: Southern Football, Fiji Football
Legend: Blue = home team win; Yellow = draw; Red = away team win.

== Women's Competitions ==
=== South Island League ===
The South Island League sits above the Canterbury Women's Premiership League and Southern Women's Premier League and is also overseen by Mainland Football and Southern Football, despite being run by New Zealand Football as part of the New Zealand Women's National League. The league will start in late June.

==== South Island League table ====
Pos	Team	Pld	W	D	L	GF	GA	GD	Pts	Qualification
1	Cashmere Technical (C)	10	8	1	1	49	6	+43	25	Winner of Women's South Island League
2	Dunedin City Royals	10	8	1	1	25	4	+21	25	
3	Coastal Spirit SAS	10	6	1	3	25	14	+11	19	
4	Otago University	10	3	2	5	12	17	−5	11	
5	Roslyn-Wakari	10	1	2	7	5	41	−36	5	
6	Nelson Suburbs	10	0	1	9	5	39	−34	1	

Source: Mainland Football
Rules for classification: 1) Points; 2) Goal difference; 3) Goals scored; 4) Goals against; 5) Head to head; 6) Disciplinary record; 7) Coin toss
(C) Champions

=== Women's Southern Premiership League ===
Women's Southern Premiership
- Season: 2024
- Dates: 8 June - 31 August
- Champions: Green Island
- Matches: 30
- Goals: 119 (3.97 per match)
- Biggest home win: Green Island 13–3 Roslyn Wakari Reserves (24 August 2024)
- Biggest away win: Roslyn Wakari Reserves 1–6 Dunedin City Royals Reserves (6 July 2024)
- Highest scoring: Green Island 13–3 Roslyn Wakari Reserves (24 August 2024)

==== Women's Southern Premiership teams ====
Six teams are competing in the league. Otago University Thirds came 3rd, but due to the regulations allowing one team per club, 4th place Roslyn Wakari Reserves participated in this league and Otago University Thirds competed in Women's Combined Division One.

Team	Home Ground	Location	Qualifying
Dunedin City Royals Reserves	Culling Park	St Kilda	2nd in Billy Scott Cup
Green Island	Sunnyvale Park	Green Island	5th in South Island Qualifying (South)
Northern	Forrester Park	Normanby	6th in South Island Qualifying (South)
Otago University Reserves	Logan Park	Dunedin North	1st in Billy Scott Cup
Queens Park	Surrey Park	Glengarry	4th in South Island Qualifying (South)
Roslyn Wakari Reserves	Ellis Park	Glenross	4th in Billy Scott Cup

==== Women's Southern Premiership table ====
Pos	Team	Pld	W	D	L	GF	GA	GD	Pts	Qualification
1	Green Island (C)	10	6	1	3	30	18	+12	19	Winners of Women's Southern Premiership
2	Queens Park	10	6	0	4	26	14	+12	18	
3	Dunedin City Royals Reserves	10	6	0	4	21	15	+6	18	
4	Northern	10	5	2	3	17	13	+4	17	
5	Otago University Reserves	10	5	1	4	16	13	+3	16	
6	Roslyn Wakari Reserves	10	0	0	10	9	46	−37	0	

Source: Southern Football, Fiji Football
Rules for classification: 1) Points; 2) Goal difference; 3) Goals scored; All teams declared winners
(C) Champions

==== Women's Southern Premiership results table ====
Home \ Away	DCR	GIL	NOR	OU2	QPK	RWK
Dunedin City Royals Reserves		1–0	1–2	0–2	3–2	4–0
Green Island	1–3		1–1	3–2	3–2	13–3
Northern	1–2	2–3		1–1	2–1	4–1
Otago University Reserves	3–0	1–3	0–3		1–2	2–1
Queens Park	3–1	2–0	3–0	0–2		6–0
Roslyn Wakari Reserves	1–6	1–3	0–1	0–2	2–5	

Updated to match(es) played on completed. Source: Southern Football, Fiji Football
Legend: Blue = home team win; Yellow = draw; Red = away team win.

==== Women's Southern Premiership scoring ====
As of 8 June 2024

===== Women's Southern Premiership top scorers =====
Rank	Player	Club	Goals
1	Lauren Pendreigh	Green Island	10
2	Rebecca Walker	Queens Park	9
3	Tyler Andrews	Queens Park	7
4	Leilani Baeumer	Northern	4
4	Jonna Barth	Green Island	4
4	Maggie Burgess	Dunedin City Royals Reserves	4
4	Stephanie Lee	Green Island	4
4	Hayley Sim	Northern	4
4	Abby Vinicombe	Green Island	4
4	Sofia Zame	Otago University Reserves	4

=== Women's Combined Division One ===
Women's Combined Division One
- Season: 2024
- Dates: 8 June - 31 August
- Champions: Otago University Thirds
- Matches: 53
- Goals: 224 (4.23 per match)
- Biggest home win: Otago University Thirds 13–0 Mornington (31 August 2024)
- Biggest away win: Mornington 0–8 Green Island Reserves (15 June 2024)
- Highest scoring: Otago University Thirds 13–0 Mornington (31 August 2024)

==== Women's Combined Division One teams ====
Eleven teams are competing in the league. All teams that competed in Women's Division Two are in the league, with three teams from Women's Division One in the league.

Team	Home Ground	Location	Qualifying
Balclutha	Balclutha Showgrounds	Balclutha	3rd in Division Two
Dunedin City Royals Div2	Bayfield Park; Culling Park; Tonga Park	Andersons Bay; St Kilda; South Dunedin	5th in Division Two
Dunedin City Royals Leopards	Bayfield Park; Culling Park; Tonga Park	Andersons Bay; St Kilda; South Dunedin	7th in Division Two (Note: Team got withdrawn from Division Two)
Grants Braes	Ocean Grove Sportsground	Ocean Grove	5th in Billy Scott Cup
Green Island Green	Sunnyvale Park	Green Island	4th in Division Two
Green Island Gold	Sunnyvale Park	Green Island	6th in Division Two
Mornington	Mornington Park	Mornington	8th in Division Two
Mosgiel	Memorial Park Ground	Mosgiel	6th in Billy Scott Cup
Otago University Eagles	Logan Park	Dunedin North	1st in Division Two
Otago University Thirds	Logan Park	Dunedin North	3rd in Billy Scott Cup
Roslyn Wakari Shetlands	Ellis Park	Glenross	2nd in Division Two

==== Women's Combined Division One table ====
Pos	Team	Pld	W	D	L	GF	GA	GD	Pts	Qualification
1	Otago University Thirds	10	9	0	1	59	6	+53	27	Winners of Women's Southern Premiership
2	Balclutha	10	8	1	1	27	6	+21	25	
3	Dunedin City Royals Div2	10	8	0	2	33	15	+18	24	
4	Roslyn Wakari Shetlands	10	7	0	3	22	14	+8	21	
5	Green Island Green	10	6	0	4	24	29	−5	18	
6	Mosgiel	10	4	1	5	12	24	−12	13	
7	Otago University Eagles	8	3	0	5	18	14	+4	9	
8	Dunedin City Royals Leopards	9	2	1	6	11	23	−12	7	
9	Grants Braes	10	2	1	7	7	23	−16	7	
10	Green Island Gold	9	2	0	7	9	26	−17	6	
11	Mornington	10	0	0	10	2	44	−42	0	

Source: Southern Football, Fiji Football
Rules for classification: 1) Points; 2) Goal difference; 3) Goals scored; All teams declared winners

==== Women's Combined Division One results table ====
Home \ Away	BAL	DC2	DCL	GBS	GID	GIN	MOR	MOS	OUE	OU3	RWK
Balclutha			3–0	1–0		3–0		1–1			3–2
Dunedin City Royals Div2	1–2			3–0	4–1			5–0		1–8	
Dunedin City Royals Leopards		0–4				1–2	3–1		Can.		1–2
Grants Braes			2–2		2–1		1–0		0–2	0–6	
Green Island Gold	0–3		0–3				2–0		Can.	0–7	1–3
Green Island Green		2–7		3–0	3–2			0–4			
Mornington	0–7	1–2				0–8		0–1			0–3
Mosgiel			1–0	3–1	1–2				0–7	0–6	
Otago University Eagles	0–3	3–4				1–2	4–0			1–2	0–3
Otago University Thirds	2–1	5–0				9–0	13–0				1–2
Roslyn Wakari Shetlands		1–3		2–1		2–3		2–1			

Updated to match(es) played on completed. Source: Southern Football
Legend: Blue = home team win; Yellow = draw; Red = away team win.

=== Kolk Cup League ===
Kolk Cup
- Season: 2024
- Dates: 13 April - 24 August
- Champions: Thistle
- Matches: 65
- Goals: 460 (7.08 per match)
- Biggest home win: Old Boys 18–0 Waihopai (4 May 2024)
- Biggest away win: Waihopai 0–21 Thistle (8 June 2024)
- Highest scoring: Waihopai 0–21 Thistle (8 June 2024)

The Leagues starts on 13 April and finishes on 24 August, with the competition being a quadruple round robin.

==== Kolk Cup teams ====
Five teams are competing in the league.

Team	Home Ground	Location
Gore Wanderers	Hyde Park	Gore
Old Boys	Waverley Park	Waverley, Invercargill
Thistle	ILT Football Turf	Invercargill
Southend United	Bain Park	Strathern, Invercargill
Waihopai	Surrey Park	Glengarry, Invercargill
Winton	Moores Reserve	Winton
Wyndham Town	Menzies College	Wyndham

==== Kolk Cup table ====
Pos	Team	Pld	W	D	L	GF	GA	GD	Pts	Qualification
1	Thistle (C)	18	15	3	0	113	12	+101	48	Winners of Kolk Cup
2	Wyndham Town	18	12	4	2	90	27	+63	40	
3	Gore Wanderers	18	12	0	6	96	24	+72	36	
4	Old Boys	18	6	5	7	66	38	+28	23	
5	Southend United	18	5	4	9	60	49	+11	19	
6	Winton	18	4	2	12	33	78	−45	14	
7	Waihopai	18	0	0	18	2	232	−230	0	

Source: Southland Football
Rules for classification: 1) Points; 2) Goal difference; 3) Goals scored; 4) Head to Head; If tied at end of season; Play-off Match
(C) Champions

==== Kolk Cup results table ====
Home \ Away	GWS	OBS	SED	THS	WAI	WIN	WYT	GWS	OBS	SED	THS	WAI	WIN	WYT
Gore Wanderers		7–0	4–0	7–0	12–0	6–0	0–1			3–1	3–4	6–0		0–5
Old Boys	3–2		3–0	0–5	18–0	3–0	1–3	1–2		2–2				
Southend United	0–8	1–1		0–3	13–0	4–4	2–6				0–6		4–0	1–4
Thistle	3–0	5–1	2–0		14–0	8–0	6–0	4–1	1–1			15–0		
Waihopai	0–19	0–16	1–16	0–21		0–7	1–17	0–8	0–10	0–12			4–0	
Winton	1–9	4–2	0–2	1–5	7–0		0–6		2–2		1–7			0–5
Wyndham Town	1–6	2–2	2–2	3–3	10–0	9–2			2–0		1–1	13–0		

Source: Southland Football
Legend: Blue = home team win; Yellow = draw; Red = away team win.

==== Kolk Cup scoring ====
As of 24 August 2024

===== Kolk Cup top scorers =====
Rank	Player	Club	Goals
1	Freya Bools	Wyndham Town	29
2	Georgia Kelly	Thistle	26
3	Nadine Martin	Old Boys	20
4	Louise Dennison	Gore Wanderers	19
5	Caitlin Ludlow	Wyndham Town	16
6	Niamh Shirley	Thistle	15
6	Caity Soper	Wyndham Town	15
8	Phoebe Mason	Thistle	13
9	Casey Bryant	Southend United	12
10	Sarah Bell	Southend United	11
10	Bethany Loveridge	Wyndham Town	11
10	Rocio Cea Vargas	Thistle	11

===== Kolk Cup hat-tricks =====
Round	Player	For	Against	Home/Away	Result	Date
1	Sarah Bell	Southend United	Waihopai	Away	1–16	13 April 2024
1	Tracey McLeod	Southend United	Waihopai	Away	1–16	13 April 2024
1	Sara Bowie	Southend United	Waihopai	Away	1–16	13 April 2024
1	Michelle McIntosh	Southend United	Waihopai	Away	1–16	13 April 2024
2	Georgia Kelly	Thistle	Waihopai	Home	14–0	20 April 2024
3	Caity Soper (Note: Player scored 7 goals)	Gore Wanderers	Waihopai	Away	0–19	27 April 2024
3	Louise Dennison	Gore Wanderers	Waihopai	Away	0–19	27 April 2024
3	Freya Bools	Wyndham Town	Winton	Away	0–6	27 April 2024
4	Grace Pilsworth	Old Boys	Waihopai	Home	0–19	4 May 2024
4	Jorja Robertson	Old Boys	Waihopai	Home	0–19	4 May 2024
4	Gargi Lele (Note: Player scored 6 goals)	Old Boys	Waihopai	Home	0–19	4 May 2024
5	Freya Bools	Wyndham Town	Waihopai	Away	1–17	11 May 2024
5	Bethany Loveridge	Wyndham Town	Waihopai	Away	1–17	11 May 2024
6	Rocio Cea Vargas	Winton	Waihopai	Home	7–0	18 May 2024
6	Jade Priest	Winton	Waihopai	Home	7–0	18 May 2024
8	Freya Bools	Gore Wanderers	Waihopai	Home	10–0	1 June 2024
8	Olivia Brown	Gore Wanderers	Southend United	Away	0–8	1 June 2024
9	Georgia Kelly	Thistle	Waihopai	Away	0–21	8 June 2024
9	Andrea Potter	Thistle	Waihopai	Away	0–21	8 June 2024
9	Louise Dennison	Gore Wanderers	Winton	Away	1–9	8 June 2024
10	Bethany Loveridge	Wyndham Town	Winton	Home	9–2	15 June 2024
10	Caitlin Ludlow	Wyndham Town	Winton	Home	9–2	15 June 2024
10	Shiya Roger	Gore Wanderers	Waihopai	Home	12–0	15 June 2024
10	Caity Soper	Gore Wanderers	Waihopai	Home	12–0	15 June 2024
11	Sarah Bell	Southend United	Waihapoi	Away	0–12	22 June 2024
11	Niamh Shirley	Thistle	Winton	Home	8–0	22 June 2024
12	Lily McMaster	Old Boys	Waihopai	Away	0–16	29 June 2024
12	Nadine Martin	Old Boys	Waihopai	Away	0–16	29 June 2024
12	Caitlin Ludlow	Wyndham Town	Southend United	Away	2–6	29 June 2024
13	Rocio Cea Vargas	Winton	Waihopai	Away	0–7	6 July 2024
14	Georgia Kelly	Thistle	Old Boys	Away	0–5	13 July 2024
14	Louise Dennison	Gore Wanderers	Wyndham Town	Away	1–6	13 July 2024
15	Casey Bryant	Southend United	Waihopai	Home	13–0	20 July 2024
15	Tracy Ward	Southend United	Waihopai	Home	13–0	20 July 2024
16	Phoebe Manson	Thistle	Waihopai	Home	15–0	27 July 2024
16	Georgia Kelly	Thistle	Waihopai	Home	15–0	27 July 2024
17	Louise Dennison	Gore Wanderers	Waihopai	Away	0–8	3 August 2024
18	Nadine Martin	Old Boys	Waihopai	Away	0–10	7 August 2024
18	Freya Bools	Wyndham Town	Waihopai	Home	13–0	10 August 2024
20	Freya Bools	Wyndham Town	Gore Wanderers	Away	0–5	24 August 2024

===== Kolk Cup own goals =====
Round	Player	Club	H/A	Time	Goal	Result	Opponent	Date
2	Amy McFall	Waihopai	Away	46'	6–0	14–0	Thistle	6 April 2024
5	Tui Larson	Waihopai	Home	14'	0–2	1–17	Wyndham Town	11 May 2024
5	Tui Larson	Waihopai	Home	35'	0–8	1–17	Wyndham Town	11 May 2024
12	Tui Larson	Waihopai	Home	50'	0–7	0–16	Old Boys	29 June 2024
12	Laiken Trainor	Gore Wanderers	Home	5'	1–1	3–4	Thistle	29 June 2024
16	Tamel Robertson	Waihopai	Away	20'	3–0	15–0	Thistle	27 July 2024
20	Jessica Jewell	Gore Wanderers	Home	47'	1–1	1–1	Old Boys	24 August 2024
20	Paige Harland	Winton	Away	87'	4–0	4–0	Southend United	24 August 2024
