= 2022 Chatham Cup =

Tournament details
- Country: New Zealand
- Dates: 25 April 2021 – 11 September 2022
- Teams: 129

Final positions
- Champions: Auckland City
- Runners-up: Eastern Suburbs

Tournament statistics
- Matches played: 126
- Goals scored: 605 (4.8 per match)

The 2022 Chatham Cup is New Zealand's 94th annual knockout football competition.

It will have a preliminary round and four rounds proper before quarter-finals, semi-finals, and a final.

== Structure ==
Round	Date	Number of fixtures	Clubs remaining	New entries this round	Teams entering this round
Preliminary Round	25 April 2022	24	129 → 105	48	
Round 1	14-15 May 2022	41	105 → 64	58	11 NRFL Division 1 teams 10 NRFL Division 2 teams 3 Central League teams 1 Central Federation League team 7 Southern League teams 4 Mainland Premier League teams 5 FootballSouth Premier League teams
Round 2	4-5 June 2022	32	64 → 32	23	12 Northern League teams 1 NRFL Division 1 team 6 Central League teams 3 Southern League teams 1 FootballSouth Premier League team
Round 3	18-19 June 2022	16	32 → 16	None	None
Round 4	9-10 July 2021	8	16 → 8	None	None
Quarter-Finals	30-31 July 2022	4	8 → 4	None	None
Semi-Finals	20-21 August 2022	2	4 → 2	None	None
Final	11 September 2022	1	2 → 1	None	None

== Results ==
=== Preliminary round ===
Matches were played over the Anzac weekend of 22–25 April. This round contained five teams from the Auckland Sunday football leagues, AFC Bohemian Celtic, Ellerslie Tropics, Sperm Whales FC, University of Auckland FC, and Zamantix Rovers Duece, the lowest ranked teams left in the competition.

Northern Region

25 April 2022	Te Awamutu AFC (5)	2–1	Lakes Football Club (7)	Te Awamutu
14:00	J. Roil 48'; Fooulkes 78'	Report	Crumpler 25'	Stadium: Te Awamutu Stadium; Referee: Sean Coon

25 April 2022	West Hamilton United (5)	w/o	Whakatane Town AFC (7)	Hamilton
14:00		Report		Stadium: Weka Street

25 April 2022	Otorohanga AFC (8)	0–1	Waiuku AFC (9)	Ōtorohanga
14:00		Report	Mckenzie 5' (o.g.)	Stadium: Ōtorohanga Domain; Referee: Andres Castro

25 April 2022	Central United (5)	8–0	Matamata Swifts (6)	Auckland
14:00	Roberson 16' (o.g.); Ishigaki 29'; L. Backman 40', 60'; Lloyd 41'; D. Backman 66'; Dan-Tyrell 84'; Ruffel 90' (pen.)	Report		Stadium: Kiwitea Street; Referee: William Roberts

25 April 2022	Northern United (7)	2–1	Ellerslie Tropics (SUN)	Hamilton
14:00	Sokchannter 51'; Andeweg 85'	Report	L. Taylor 17'	Stadium: Korikori Park; Referee: Graham Barlow

25 April 2022	Papakura City (5)	3–3 (a.e.t.) (5–3 p)	Ranui Swanson (5)	Auckland
14:00	Dixon 15'; Krishna 71'; S. Hart 100'	Report	Morris 41'; Root 83'; Nelson 96'	Stadium: McLennan Park; Referee: Karl Barry
	Penalties
	Allan (penalty scored); Mika (penalty scored); Kumar (penalty scored); S. Hart (penalty scored); Krishna (penalty scored)		(penalty scored) Perkovic; (penalty missed) Hastings; (penalty scored) Puga; (penalty scored) Nelson

25 April 2022	FC Whangarei (6)	2–2 (a.e.t.) (7–8 p)	Sperm Whales FC (SUN)	Whangārei
14:00	Teal 22'; Dunn 64'	Report	Read 9', 32'	Stadium: Morningside Park; Referee: Dan Owens

25 April 2022	Papamoa (5)	2–1	Papatoetoe AFC (5)	Tauranga
14:00	van der Salm 23'; A. Singh 85' (o.g.)	Report	Shaker 4'	Stadium: Gordon Spratt Reserve; Referee: Paul Shakes

25 April 2022	Drury United (9)	2–5	Kerikeri FC (6)	Drury
14:00	Bent 27'; Chapman 56'	Report	Godden 18'; Roberts 58', 83' (pen.); Montino 79'; Huett 89'	Stadium: Drury Sportsgrounds; Referee: Carl Te Wharau

25 April 2022	Onerahi FC (6)	4–2	Lynn-Avon United (5)	Onerahi
14:00	Coenra 10'; Burgess 17', 77'; Hanmore 87'	Report	Hong 40'; Semp 46'	Stadium: Onerahi Sports Field; Referee: Benjamin McInnes

25 April 2022	Uni-Mount Bohemian AFC (5)	1–2	Ngongotaha AFC (5)	Auckland
14:00	Forsyth 65'	Report	Simiona 23'; Barker 90+1'	Stadium: Bill McKinlay Park; Referee: Kelvin Lewis

25 April 2022	Waikato Unicol (5)	3–2	South Auckland Rangers (5)	Hamilton
14:00	Latham 6'; Ditfort 36'; Henderson 53'	Report	S. Kumar 16'; P. Kumar 83'	Stadium: Jansen Park; Referee: Brendon Coker

25 April 2022	Zamantix Rovers Deuce (SUN)	3–4 (a.e.t.)	Te Atatu AFC (5)	Ellerslie
14:00	Westcar 13', 85'; Sanders 15'	Report	Norris 27'; Wells 76', 80', 112'	Stadium: Greenmount Reserve; Referee: Derek Anderson

25 April 2022	Puhoi (9)	0–5	Mangere United (9)	Rodney
14:00		Report	S. Ali 7', 16', 49'; Hakim 18'; Zoheb 71'	Stadium: Puhoi Domain; Referee: Glen McLeod

25 April 2022	AFC Bohemian Celtic (SUN)	0–5	Taupo AFC (5)	Auckland
14:00		Report	O'Donoghue 17', 36', 52'; How 49'; Foster 82'	Stadium: William Green Domain; Referee: Paul Burns

25 April 2022	University of Auckland (SUN)	0–2	Otumoetai (5)	Auckland
14:15		Report	Mulligan 25'; Boland 40'	Stadium: Seymour Park; Referee: Jeremy Ferguson

Central Region

25 April 2022	Woodleigh FC (4)	0–4	Wanganui Athletic (3)	New Plymouth
14:00		Report	Simcox 17'; Meredith 62', 78'; Mailman 73'	Stadium: Sutherland Park; Referee: Craig Laird

25 April 2022	FC Western (4)	0–3	Palmerston North Marist (3)	New Plymouth
14:00		Report	Rumere 30', 51'; Minshull 78'	Stadium: Lynmouth Park; Referee: Matthew Hastings

Capital Region

25 April 2022	Naenae SC (6)	2–1 (a.e.t.)	Paekākāriki SC (8)	Lower Hutt
14:00	Stratford 29' (pen.); Bryant 105'	Report	F. Howard 45+1'	Stadium: Naenae Park; Referee: Barry Buchanan

25 April 2022	Wellington Marist (5)	4–0	Greytown FC (7)	Wellington
14:00	G. Peattie 8', 42'; Keetley 55'; Khan 90'	Report		Stadium: Kilbirnie Park; Referee: Jan Chmielewski

Mainland Region

25 April 2022	Western (3)	0–1	Universities (3)	Christchurch
14:00		Report	Campbell 44' (pen.)	Stadium: English Park; Referee: Michael Field

25 April 2022	High School Old Boys (9)	0–10	Waimakariri United (3)	Kaiapoi
14:45		Report	Elmohib 9', 22', 31', 48'; Cochrane 68'; Loney 80', 86'; Quigley 85', 90'; Hale 88'	Stadium: Kendal Park; Referee: Paul Pace

25 April 2022	FC Nelson (4)	1–0	Golden Bay AFC (5)	Nelson
15:30		Report		Stadium: Guppy Park; Referee: Kurt Ward

25 April 2022	Richmond Athletic (4)	5–0	Mapua Rangers (7)	Richmond
19:00		Report		Stadium: Jubilee Park; Referee: Maurice John Llewellin

All teams listed below received byes to the first round.

Northern Region: Albany United, Auckland City FC, Auckland United, Bay Olympic, Beachlands Maraetai AFC, Birkenhead United, Bucklands Beach, Cambridge FC, Claudelands Rovers, East Coast Bays, Eastern Suburbs, Ellerslie AFC, Fencibles United, Franklin United, Hamilton Wanderers, Hibiscus Coast, Manukau United, Manurewa AFC, Melville United AFC, Metro FC, Mt Albert Ponsonby AFC, Ngaruawahia United, North Shore United, Northern Rovers, Northland FC, Onehunga Mangere United, Oratia United, Takapuna AFC, Tauranga City, Tauranga Old Blues FC, Waiheke United, Waitemata FC, West Auckland AFC, West Coast Rangers, Western Springs
Central Region: N/a

Capital Region: Brooklyn Northern United, Havelock North Wanderers, Island Bay United, Kapiti Coast United, Lower Hutt City, Isles Construction Massey University, Miramar Rangers, Napier City Rovers, North Wellington, Petone FC, Seatoun AFC, Stokes Valley, Stop Out, Tawa AFC, Upper Hutt City Football, Victoria University, Waikanae AFC, Wainuiomata AFC, Waterside Karori, Wellington Olympic, Wellington United, Western Suburbs
Mainland Region: Burwood AFC, Cashmere Technical, Christchurch United, Coastal Spirit, FC Twenty 11, Ferrymead Bays, Halswell United, Mosgiel AFC, Nelson Suburbs, Nomads United, Parklands United, Roslyn Wakari, Selwyn United, Tahuna FC
Southern Region: Dunedin City Royals, Gore Wanderers, Grants Braes AFC, Green Island, Northern AFC, Old Boys AFC, Otago University, Queens Park, Queenstown AFC, Wanaka AFC

=== Round 1 ===
Round 1 matches were played between 14 and 15 May 2022. This round contained one team from the Auckland Sunday football leagues, Sperm Whales FC, the lowest ranked team left in the competition.

Northern Region

14 May 2022	Ngongotaha AFC (5)	3–2	Tauranga Old Blues FC (5)	Ngongotahā
14:00	Balaho 14'; Barker 28', 77'	Report	Torres 48'; J. J. Reynoso 88'	Stadium: Tamarahi Reserve; Referee: Andres Castro

14 May 2022	Waikato Unicol (5)	1–4	Tauranga City (3)	Hamilton
14:00	Wright 90+5'	Report	Robson 25' (o.g.); Molloy 43'; Brinkmann 53'; Maddox 74'	Stadium: Jansen Park; Referee: Kirk Davis

14 May 2022	Cambridge FC (4)	2–1	Onehunga-Mangere United (3)	Cambridge
14:00	Clarkin 14', 51'	Report	Rastagar 87'	Stadium: John Kerkhof Park; Referee: Benjamin Norman

14 May 2022	Northern Rovers (3)	5–0	Mangere United (9)	North Shore
14:00	Rhodes 4'; Caunter 11' (pen.), 90' (pen.); Harbottle 25'; Shaw 84'	Report		Stadium: McFetridge Park; Referee: Brandon Day

14 May 2022	West Coast Rangers (3)	9–0	Papakura City (5)	Whenuapai
14:00	Kelly 2', 32'; Dwamena 7'; Banks 8', 63', 85'; Blackwood 59' (pen.); Armitt 70'; Gallagher 88'	Report		Stadium: Fred Taylor Park; Referee: Nick Waldron

14 May 2022	Mt Albert Ponsonby (3)	11–1	Otumoetai (5)	Auckland
14:00	Colligan 13', 17', 22', 33'; Hindson 14', 25'; Benitez Cuero 15', 38'; Black 49' (pen.); Streamer 59'; Rathburn 81'	Report	Sindler 90+3'	Stadium: Anderson Park; Referee: Aaron Day

14 May 2022	Bucklands Beach (4)	4–0	Kerikeri FC (6)	Pakuranga Heights
14:00	McCarthy 22'; Smith 55', 90+2'; Bohea 66'	Report		Stadium: Lloyd Elsmore Park; Referee: Ronald van Zuilen

14 May 2022	Northland FC (4)	1–4	Manurewa (3)	Whangārei
14:00	Rotimi 36'	Report	Perez 44'; Bobadilla 80'; Horgan 84', 90+1'	Stadium: Trigg Arena; Referee: Craig Crawford

14 May 2022	Te Awamutu AFC (5)	0–1	Metro (3)	Te Awamutu
14:00		Report	Englefield 9' (pen.)	Stadium: Te Awamutu Stadium; Referee: Brendan Coker

14 May 2022	West Auckland (4)	6–1	Onerahi FC (6)	Auckland
14:00	Wilcox 4'; West 7'; Rollinson 10', 36'; M. Hearn 48'; Riddoch 90+3'	Report	Hannmore 39'	Stadium: Brains Park; Referee: Samuel Clement

14 May 2022	East Coast Bays (3)	2–0	Te Atatu AFC (5)	North Shore
14:00	Kelly 2'; Gaze 88'	Report		Stadium: Bay City Park; Referee: Tanvir Bhamji

14 May 2022	Hibiscus Coast (4)	3–4	Albany United (3)	Whangaparaoa
14:00	Dickinson 10'; Mayes 33', 40'	Report	Roberts 41'; Martin 72' (o.g.); Mosquera 83'; McGuinness 88'	Stadium: Stanmore Bay Park; Referee: Glen Lochrie

15 May 2022	Northern United (7)	2–5	Taupo AFC (5)	Hamilton
14:00	Payton 34'; Legaz-Hounslow 80'	Report	Perrott 11'; O'Donoghue 21'; Semple 26'; Foster 59'; Smith 90+2'	Stadium: Korikori Park; Referee: Sarah Elyse Jones

15 May 2022	Central United (5)	3–1	Waitemata (3)	Auckland
14:00	Lloyd 38', 70'; Guthrie 60'	Report	Ruffell 62' (o.g.)	Stadium: Kiwitea Street; Referee: Fidel Jaary

15 May 2022	West Hamilton United (5)	7–1	Waiuku AFC (9)	Hamilton
14:00	Venema 38', 49' (pen.), 70'; N. Mire 73', 80', 83'; Muldrock 78'	Report	Lusty 13'	Stadium: Weka Street; Referee: Phillip Rogers

15 May 2022	Papamoa (5)	3–2	Ellerslie (3)	Tauranga
14:00	O'Donoghue 33'; Giles 84'; van der Salm 86'	Report	Durkin 52' (pen.); Clark 81'	Stadium: Gordon Spratt Reserve; Referee: Andrew Mitchell

15 May 2022	Sperm Whales FC (SUN)	2–1	Ngaruawahia United (4)	Auckland
14:00	Chiaroni 39'; Twigg 87' (pen.)	Report	Connor 66'	Stadium: Seymour Park; Referee: Yunjie Diao

15 May 2022	Beachlands Maraetai (4)	3–4	Claudelands Rovers (4)	Beachlands
15:00	C. Szopa 62'; Birch 65'; Hamilton 72'	Report	Breadmore 12', 37'; Thompson 40' (pen.); Clark 60'	Stadium: Te Puru Park; Referee: Wayne Barry

25 May 2022	Franklin United (4)	3–0	Oratia United (4)	Tuakau
19:30	Lazarus 1'; Narayan 32'; Abbott 90+2'	Report		Stadium: Dr John Lightbody Reserve; Referee: Mark Fleming
Note: Match abandoned on original date of 14 May, due to floodlights not working.

Central Region

14 May 2022	Wanganui Athletic (3)	3–1	Havelock North Wanderers (2)	Wanganui
14:00	Meredith 67'; Mailman 68', 69'	Report	Christensen 78' (pen.)	Stadium: Wembley Park; Referee: Antony Riley

14 May 2022	Palmerston North Marist (3)	4–1	Massey University (3)	Palmerston North
17:00	Monk 24'; Carrick 34'; Rumere 55'; Kilkelly 77' (o.g.)	Report	Mori 51'	Stadium: Arena Turf; Referee: Edward Cook

Capital Region

14 May 2022	Brooklyn Northern United (4)	3–4	Wainuiomata (3)	Wellington
13:30	Trott 4' (o.g.); Sperring 26'; Glenn 65'	Report	Hinton 43'; King 44'; Ross 60', 84'	Stadium: Wakefield Park; Referee: Nigel Piper

14 May 2022	Seatoun (3)	0–8	Wellington Olympic (1)	Wellington
14:00		Report	Bouzoukis 11', 44', 51', 62'; Gaul 58', 83'; Randall 78'; Thurston 89'	Stadium: Seatoun Park; Referee: Cory Mills

14 May 2022	Kapiti Coast United (4)	0–1	Upper Hutt City (3)	Kāpiti
14:00		Report	Fong 28'	Stadium: Weka Park; Referee: Marten Kooij

14 May 2022	Victoria University (4)	1–4	Tawa (3)	Wellington
14:00	Pocock 45+1'	Report	Hill 17'; Jackson 26'; Findlay 29'; Willis-Benton 90+3'	Stadium: Kelburn Park; Referee: Sean Lau

14 May 2022	Naenae SC (6)	0–4	Island Bay United (3)	Lower Hutt
14:00		Report	Mitchener 11'; Sutton 43'; McKay 73'; Chadwick 84'	Stadium: Naenae Park; Referee: Aaron Clarke

14 May 2022	Wellington United (2)	3–1	Stop Out (3)	Wellington
14:00	Junca 23'; Hilbron 76', 78'	Report	Prins 83'	Stadium: Newtown Park; Referee: John Rowbury

14 May 2022	Lower Hutt City (3)	5–0	Stokes Valley (5)	Lower Hutt
14:30	Makowem 13' (pen.); Reid 55'; Candy 62'; Flowerdew 76', 85'	Report		Stadium: Fraser Park; Referee: Chris Bennett

15 May 2022	Waikanae AFC (5)	0–10	Wellington Marist (5)	Waikanae
14:00		Report	Greig 3', 24', 33'; Stratford 23', 55'; Keetley 34'; Bouma 41'; Brash 49'; Moger 59'; Gilchrist 76'	Stadium: Jim Cooke Memorial Park; Referee: Marten Kooij

Mainland Region

13 May 2022	Ferrymead Bays (2)	5–0	FC Twenty 11 (3)	Christchurch
19:00	Pierce 42', 50', 53'; Meaclem 52'; Metherell 55'	Report		Stadium: Ferrymead Park; Referee: Aaron Nottage

14 May 2022	Coastal Spirit (2)	3–1	Waimakariri United (3)	Christchurch
14:00	Rai 45+3'; McGarr 60', 63'	Report	Quigley 41'	Stadium: English Park; Referee: Paul Pace

14 May 2022	Halswell United (3)	1–2 (a.e.t.)	Parklands United (3)	Christchurch
14:00	Cameron 89'	Report	Jones 47'; Lingard 112'	Stadium: Halswell Domain; Referee: Iain Marshall

14 May 2022	Universities (3)	0–6	Christchurch United (1)	Christchurch
14:00		Report	MacLennan 5', 81'; Lapslie 16'; Mort 41'; Issa 45+1'; Wilkinson 47'	Stadium: Ilam Fields; Referee: Michael Killick

14 May 2022	Cashmere Technical (1)	6–0	Nomads United (2)	Christchurch
14:00	J. Richards 24', 42', 44'; Matthysen 26'; Coughlan 48'; Caswell 51' (o.g.)	Report		Stadium: Garrick Memorial Park; Referee: Caleb Downes

14 May 2022	Burwood (3)	0–5	Selwyn United (2)	Christchurch
14:00		Report	Carrodus 44'; Allatt 67'; N. Fairley 81'; Murdoch 87'; van Wyk 88'	Stadium: Clare Park; Referee: Ben O'Connell

15 May 2022	Nelson Suburbs (2)	4–0	Richmond Athletic (4)	Nelson
11:00	Platt 21'; Yong 38' (pen.), 73' (pen.); McPhie 80'	Report		Stadium: Saxton Field; Referee: Richard Malcolm

15 May 2022	FC Nelson (4)	3–2	Tahuna FC (4)	Nelson
14:00	Hlawnceu 11'; Piere 40'; Macfadyen 45'	Report	Costa Vaz 78'	Stadium: Trafalgar Park; Referee: Maurice John Llewellin

Southern Region

14 May 2022	Queens Park (3)	7–0	Grants Braes (7)	Invercargill
15:00	Castillo Viveros 2', 12', 26'; Castle 25'; Larsen 62'; Miranda 86', 90+1'	Report		Stadium: ILT Football Turf; Referee: Nikolay Shevlyakov

14 May 2022	Gore Wanderers (5)	0–6	Roslyn-Wakari (3)	Gore
14:00		Report	Williams 13'; Wilkie 36', 58', 75'; Williams-Davies 39', 47'	Stadium: Hyde Park; Referee: Mason Robinson

14 May 2022	Northern (3)	13–2	Old Boys (4)	Dunedin
14:00	Teixeira 4'; Hibbert 17', 38', 79' (pen.); Muir 32', 45', 51', 60', 82', 84'; Savou 47'; Newall 70'; Fabre 72' (o.g.)	Report	Stout 56', 89'	Stadium: Forrester Park; Referee: Wayne van Gorp

15 May 2022	Wanaka (3)	3–4 (a.e.t.)	Otago University (3)	Wānaka
13:00	Campbell 45'; Scoullar 49'; Pleskun 56'	Report	Kidd 17'; S. Murray 30', 43', 108' (pen.)	Stadium: Wānaka Recreation Centre; Referee: Lindsey Robinson

All teams listed below received byes to the second round.

Northern Region: Auckland City, Auckland United, Bay Olympic, Birkenhead United, Eastern Suburbs, Fencibles United, Hamilton Wanderers, Manukau United, Melville United, North Shore United, Takapuna, Waiheke United, Western Springs,
Capital Region: Napier City Rovers, North Wellington, Petone, Miramar Rangers, Waterside Karori, Western Suburbs
Mainland: None
Southern: Dunedin City Royals, Green Island, Mosgiel, Queenstown AFC

=== Round 2 ===
All matches were played on Queen's Birthday weekend 4–6 June 2022. This round contained one team from the Auckland Sunday football leagues, Sperm Whales FC, the lowest ranked team left in the competition.

Northern Region

6 June 2022	Manurewa (3)	1–2 (a.e.t.)	Birkenhead United (1)	Auckland
14:00	M. Shah 26'	Report	Jorgensen 57'; Hobson 114'	Stadium: Jellicoe Park; Referee: Kelvin Lewis

6 June 2022	North Shore United (2)	1–3	Cambridge (4)	North Shore
14:00	Peredo 28'	Report	Portegys 38'; Clarkin 42'; Ganas 48'	Stadium: Allen Hill Stadium; Referee: Ronald Van Zuilen

6 June 2022	Claudelands Rovers (4)	0–2	Papamoa (5)	Hamilton
14:00		Report	O'Donoghue 48'; Kenny 70'	Stadium: Galloway Park; Referee: Andres Castro

6 June 2022	Franklin United (4)	1–2	Melville United (1)	Tuakau
14:00	Hewitt-Swaine 90'	Report	K. Richards 44' (pen.); Lawrence 77' (pen.)	Stadium: Dr John Lightbody Reserve; Referee: Avi Narayan

6 June 2022	West Coast Rangers (3)	1–2	Waiheke United (2)	Whenuapai
14:00	Gallagher 37'	Report	Canay 45+2'; Vanina 48'	Stadium: Fred Taylor Park; Referee: Brandon Day

6 June 2022	Sperm Whales (SUN)	1–5	Metro (3)	Auckland
14:00	Chiaroni 66'	Report	McCracken 15'; Minto 27'; Englefield 40', 83'; Han 79'	Stadium: Phyllis Street Reserve; Referee: Daniel Neville

6 June 2022	Hamilton Wanderers (2)	1–0	Takapuna (2)	Hamilton
14:00	Lamb 46'	Report		Stadium: Porritt Stadium; Referee: Andy Holdsworth

6 June 2022	Auckland United (1)	9–1	West Hamilton United (5)	Auckland
14:00	Zambrano 7', 27'; Middleton 29'; Stephen 47', 59'; Jones 50'; Ishibashi 81'; Redfearn 89', 90+1'	Report	N. Mire 14'	Stadium: Keith Hay Park; Referee: Luke Gardner

6 June 2022	West Auckland (4)	2–0	Bucklands Beach (4)	Auckland
14:00	Johnston 25'; Peden 82'	Report		Stadium: Brains Park; Referee: Johnathon Smith

6 June 2022	Mt Albert Ponsonby (3)	0–3	Eastern Suburbs (2)	Auckland
14:00		Report	Jarvie 2'; Built 57', 90'	Stadium: Anderson Park; Referee: Alec Couchman

6 June 2022	Ngongotaha (5)	1–4	Central United (5)	Ngongotahā
14:00	Trask 45'	Report	Ruffell 4'; Metzger 24'; J. Ishigaki 38'; Lloyd 59'	Stadium: Tamarahi Reserve; Referee: Benjamin Norman

6 June 2022	Taupo AFC (5)	1–2	Bay Olympic (2)	Taupō
14:00	O'Donogue 52'	Report	Tutton 10'; White 65'	Stadium: Crown Park; Referee: Andrew Lamberth

6 June 2022	Fencibles United (3)	3–0	Northern Rovers (3)	Auckland
14:00	Clarke 30'; Maukau 87'; Tweed 90+2'	Report		Stadium: Riverhills Park; Referee: Jeremy Ferguson

6 June 2022	Western Springs (2)	0–1	Manukau United (2)	Auckland
14:00		Report	Golding 85'	Stadium: Crum Park; Referee: Nick Waldron

6 June 2022	East Coast Bays (3)	3–2	Tauranga City (3)	Oteha
14:00	Kim 9'; Kelly 40'; Collett 90+3'	Report	Maddox 11'; McLeod 70'	Stadium: Bay City Park; Referee: Mazhar Batoor

14 June 2022	Auckland City (1)	6–1	Albany United (3)	Auckland
19:00	Tade 6'; Lobo 50'; Manickum 82', 88'; Drake 85'; de Vries 90+1'	Report	Hicks 45+1'	Stadium: Croatian Cultural Club; Referee: Nick Waldron
Note: Game originally scheduled to 06 June but postponed due to Covid

Capital / Central Region

4 June 2022	Palmerston North Marist (3)	0–3*	Island Bay United (3)	Palmerston North
14:00	Carrick 25'; Charlton 54'; Rumere 62', 84'	Report	Lenihan-Geels 9', 90+4'; McPhee 12'	Stadium: Arena Turf; Referee: Matthew Hastings
Note: The match between Palmerston North Marist and Island Bay United was originally an on-field 4–3 win for Palmerston North but they were deemed to have fielded an ineligible player and the result was overturn to a 3–0 loss instead. Island Bay progressed to round three.

4 June 2022	Lower Hutt City (3)	1–1 (a.e.t.) (3–4 p)	Wellington United (2)	Lower Hutt
14:00	Van Hattum 46'	Report	Fong 58'	Stadium: Fraser Park; Referee: Cameron Gruschow

4 June 2022	Tawa (3)	1–4 (a.e.t.)	Western Suburbs (2)	Wellington
14:00	Hill 63'	Report	F. Brown 38', 94'; O'Connor 109'; Garbett 113'	Stadium: Redwood Park; Referee: Isaac Trevis

4 June 2022	Wainuiomata (3)	0–7	North Wellington (2)	Lower Hutt
14:00		Report	Fay 14'; Hakaraia 49', 61' (o.g.); Imarhiagbe 65'; Hopper 68'; Manuel 78'; Othman 86'	Stadium: Richard Prouse Park; Referee: Mark Whitehead

4 June 2022	Petone (2)	2–4 (a.e.t.)	Napier City Rovers (1)	Lower Hutt
15:00	McMinn 55', 75'	Report	Mandair 42'; Schofield 90+1' (pen.); Allen 101'; Madsen 113'	Stadium: Memorial Park; Referee: Chris Bennet

6 June 2022	Whanganui Athletic (3)	0–5	Wellington Olympic (1)	Whanganui
14:00		Report	Randall 15'; Gould 34' (pen.), 78', 85'; Bouzoukis 64'	Stadium: Wembley Park; Referee: Antony Riley

11 June 2022	Waterside Karori (2)	0–4	Miramar Rangers (1)	Wellington
14:00		Report	Gatkek 1' (o.g.); Spain 33'; Barnett 62'; Souphanthavong 85'	Stadium: Martin Luckie Park; Referee: Nigel Piper
Note: Game originally scheduled to 04 June but postponed due to Covid

11 June 2022	Upper Hutt City (3)	1–3	Wellington Marist (5)	Upper Hutt
15:30	Taye 77' (pen.)	Report	Brash 29'; Greig 40'; Lyttle 66'	Stadium: Maidstone Park; Referee: Conor Healy
Note: Game originally scheduled to 04 June but postponed due to Covid

Mainland Region

3 June 2022	Ferrymead Bays (2)	3–2 (a.e.t.)	Christchurch United (1)	Christchurch
17:15	Stanley 60', 97'; Morris 81' (o.g.)	Report	Rabuka 37'; MacLennan 89'	Stadium: Ferrymead Park

6 June 2022	FC Nelson (4)	0–6	Nelson Suburbs (2)	Nelson
14:00		Report	Creswell 2', 45', 53', 66'; Polak 32'; Carter 40'	Stadium: Victory Square; Referee: Maurice John Llewellin

6 June 2022	Cashmere Technical (1)	3–1	Selwyn United (2)	Christchurch
14:00	J. Richards 16', 74'; Vickers 38'	Report	Barbour-Ryan 8'	Stadium: Garrick Memorial Park; Referee: Ben O'Connell

14 June 2022	Parklands United (3)	0–7	Coastal Spirit (2)	Christchurch
19:00		Report	Mitchell 13', 55', 81', 89'; Canobbio 41'; Livingstone 64' (o.g.)	Stadium: English Park; Referee: Aaron Nottage
Note: Originally scheduled for the 6 June, game was postponed due to Covid

Southern Region

6 June 2022	Dunedin City Royals (2)	6–0	Queenstown (3)	Dunedin
14:00	Hawkins 18'; Neil 48', 64' (pen.), 68'; Watanabe 57'; Stanley 86'	Report		Stadium: Multi Sport Turf; Referee: Dan Woulahan

6 June 2022	Roslyn-Wakari (3)	1–2	Mosgiel (2)	Dunedin
14:00	Sannun 90+1' (pen.)	Report	Findlay 35'; Taylor 85'	Stadium: Ellis Park; Referee: Lindsey Robinson

6 June 2022	Otago University (3)	0–4	Green Island (2)	Dunedin
14:00		Report	Hewson 4', 26', 54'; Cox 41'	Stadium: Football Turf; Referee: Wayne Van Gorp

6 June 2022	Queens Park (3)	1–4	Northern (3)	Invercargill
14:00	Mwangi 19'	Report	Al Mawali 10'; Muir 24', 26' (pen.), 65'	Stadium: Surrey Park; Referee: Craig Campbell

=== Round 3 ===
All matches were played on the weekend of 18–19 June 2022. This round contained three teams from level 5, Central United, Papamoa and Wellington Marist, the lowest ranked teams left in the competition.

Northern Region

18 June 2022	Melville United (1)	6–1	East Coast Bays (3)	Hamilton
14:00	Dowling 14'; Brown 47'; Richards 56', 59'; Lagos 63'; Lawrence 79'	Report	Beaton 83'	Stadium: Gower Park; Referee: Andres Castro

18 June 2022	Fencibles United (3)	2–2 (a.e.t.) (4–5 p)	Eastern Suburbs (2)	Auckland
14:00	Clarke 10'; Garofalaki 24'	Report	Carlson-du Toit 54'; Champness 61'	Stadium: Riverhills Park; Referee: Hayden Tutbury

18 June 2022	West Auckland (4)	4–6 (a.e.t.)	Waiheke United (2)	Auckland
14:00	M. Hearn 8'; Peden 18'; J. Hearn 45', 90+6' (pen.)	Report	Lindner 3', 27', 58' (pen.); Llunes 22'; Vanina 114'; Herrera 116'	Stadium: Brains Park; Referee: Nick Waldron

18 June 2022	Auckland United (1)	6–1	Cambridge (4)	Auckland
14:00	Redfearn 11', 65'; Machuca Maturena 49'; Fay 63'; Zambrano 84'; McCarthy 87'	Report	Woodlock 22'	Stadium: Keith Hay Park; Referee: William Roberts

18 June 2022	Bay Olympic (2)	2–1	Metro (3)	Auckland
14:00	Byrne 66'; McNeill 81'	Report	Englefield 45+1' (pen.)	Stadium: Olympic Park; Referee: Mazhar Batoor

18 June 2022	Auckland City (1)	6–0	Manukau United (2)	Auckland
14:00	Howieson 29'; Brotherton 31'; de Vries 41', 73'; Ellis 80', 83'	Report		Stadium: Kiwitea Street; Referee: Luke Gardner

19 June 2022	Papamoa (5)	0–3	Hamilton Wanderers (2)	Tauranga
14:00		Report	Singh 18'; Tieku 51'; Pratt 90+1'	Stadium: Gordon Spratt Reserve; Referee: Andrew Lamberth

19 June 2022	Birkenhead United (1)	4–0	Central United (5)	Auckland
15:00	Connor-McClean 59'; Burfoot 74'; Jorgenson 76'; Hughes 80'	Report		Stadium: Shepherds Park; Referee: Ashley Wilson

Central / Capital Region

18 June 2022	North Wellington (2)	1–6	Wellington Olympic (1)	Wellington
14:00	Allan 86'	Report	Randall 27', 87'; Brown 50' (o.g.); Bouzoukis 53'; Gould 62', 85' (pen.)	Stadium: Alex Moore Park; Referee: Chris Bennett

18 June 2022	Island Bay United (3)	1–3	Miramar Rangers (1)	Wellington
15:30	Chadwick 69'	Report	Watson 30'; Mason-Smith 69'; Hickson Rowden 77' (o.g.)	Stadium: Wakefield Park; Referee: Mark Whitehead

19 June 2022	Wellington Marist (5)	1–5	Western Suburbs (2)	Wellington
14:00	Lyttle 81'	Report	Simes 53', 56', 65'; Garbett 68'; Brown 85'	Stadium: Kilbirnie Park; Referee: John Rowbury

19 June 2022	Napier City Rovers (1)	7–0	Wellington United (2)	Napier
14:00	Schofield 1'; McNamara 21', 39'; Somerton 52'; Allen 62'; Stevenson 67'; Mason 90+1'	Report		Stadium: Bluewater Stadium; Referee: Mark Rule

Mainland

18 June 2022	Ferrymead Bays (2)	1–2 (a.e.t.)	Cashmere Technical (1)	Christchurch
14:30	Pierce 61'	Report	Matthysen 8'; Schwarz 105+2' (pen.)	Stadium: Ferrymead Park; Referee: Subho Sarkar

19 June 2022	Nelson Suburbs (2)	1–1 (a.e.t.) (5–4 p)	Coastal Spirit (2)	Nelson
12:00	Higgs 27'	Report	Zimmerman 45'	Stadium: Saxton Field; Referee: James Berry
	Penalties
	Higgs (penalty scored); Larsen (penalty scored); Yong (penalty scored); Cadigan (penalty scored); Wallace (penalty scored)		(penalty scored) Hogan; (penalty scored) McGarr; (penalty missed) Mitchell; (penalty scored) Zimmerman; (penalty scored) Canobbio

Southern Region

18 June 2022	Green Island (2)	5–1	Northern (3)	Green Island
13:30	Mandich 21' (o.g.); Anderson 45+1'; Manson 47'; Henry 66'; McLean 69'	Report	Muir 2' (pen.)	Stadium: Sunnyvale Park; Referee: Jack Henderson

19 June 2022	Mosgiel (2)	1–2	Dunedin City Royals (2)	Mosgiel
13:00	M. Day 9'	Report	de Groot-Green 89'; Watanabe 90+4'	Stadium: Memorial Park; Referee: Bruce James

=== Round 4 ===
All matches were played on the weekend of 9–10 July 2022. This round featured 16 teams from the National League regional leagues (level 2) including two competing in the Championship phase (level 1).

Northern Region

9 July 2022	Bay Olympic (2)	1–2	Auckland City (1)	Auckland
14:00	Duncan 32'	Report	Drake 57'; Ilich 71'	Stadium: Olympic Park; Referee: Luke Gardner

9 June 2022	Melville United (1)	1–2	Waiheke United (2)	Hamilton
14:00	Lawrence 46'	Report	Timmins-Scanlon 47'; Ciganda 59' (pen.)	Stadium: Gower Park; Referee: Andres Castro

9 July 2022	Auckland United (1)	0–0 (a.e.t.) (2–3 p)	Hamilton Wanderers (2)	Auckland
14:00		Report		Stadium: Keith Hay Park; Referee: Allan Wilson

20 July 2022	Birkenhead United (1)	0–2	Eastern Suburbs (2)	Auckland
19:00		Report	Mechell 69'; Carlson-du Toit 90+4'	Stadium: Shepherds Park; Referee: Chris Trent

Capital / Central Region

9 July 2022	Miramar Rangers (1)	5–1	Western Suburbs (2)	Wellington
14:00	Watson 7', 14'; Gatkek 17'; Mason-Smith 35', 51'	Report	Abrahaberhe 78'	Stadium: David Farrington Park; Referee: Aaron Clarke

10 July 2022	Napier City Rovers (1)	0–4	Wellington Olympic (1)	Napier
14:00		Report	Palezevic 44'; Bouzoukis 60'; Gould 72', 85'	Stadium: Bluewater Stadium; Referee: Mark Rule

Mainland / Southern Region

9 July 2022	Cashmere Technical (1)	9–0	Green Island (2)	Christchurch
12:00	McIsaac 7'; Matthysen 9'; Coughlan 15'; Storer 18'; J. Richards 38'; Angus 59', 74'; Barron 74' (o.g.); Lapslie 85'	Report		Stadium: Garrick Memorial Park; Referee: Caleb Downes

9 July 2022	Dunedin City Royals (2)	3–1	Nelson Suburbs (2)	Dunedin
12:30	Stanley 18', 62'; Turner 79'	Report	McGookin 70'	Stadium: Football Turf; Referee: Aaron Nottage

=== Quarter-finals ===
The quarter-finals were played on 30 July 2022. This round featured eight teams from the National League regional leagues (level 2) including two competing in the Championship phase (level 1).

30 July 2022	Dunedin City Royals (2)	0–6	Auckland City (1)	Dunedin
13:00		Report	De Vries 9', 41', 75'; Howieson 13' (pen.); Lee 18'; Tade 62'	Stadium: Football Turf; Referee: Jack Henderson

30 July 2022	Miramar Rangers (1)	3–4	Hamilton Wanderers (2)	Wellington
14:00	Feutz 79'; Watson 86', 88' (pen.)	Report	Bayliss 17'; Clout 62'; Oliver 70'; Tieku 72'	Stadium: David Farrington Park; Referee: Cory Mills

30 July 2022	Wellington Olympic (1)	3–2	Cashmere Technical (1)	Wellington
14:00	Storer 22' (o.g.); Gould 51' (pen.); Davenport Petersen 69'	Report	Matthysen 7'; Coughlan 86' (pen.)	Stadium: Wakefield Park; Referee: Sean Reilly

30 July 2022	Waiheke United (2)	0–1	Eastern Suburbs (2)	Waiheke Island
14:00		Report	Mechell 58'	Stadium: Onetangi Sports Complex; Referee: Campbell-Kirk Kawana-Waugh

=== Semi-finals ===
The semi-finals was played on the weekend of the 20/21 August 2022. This round featured four teams from the National League regional leagues (level 2) including two competing in the Championship phase (level 1).

20 August 2022	Eastern Suburbs (2)	1–0	Hamilton Wanderers (2)	Auckland
14:00	Thurston 61' (pen.)	Report		Stadium: Madills Farm; Referee: Chris Bennett

21 August 2022	Auckland City (1)	3–1	Wellington Olympic (1)	Auckland
14:00	Manickum 10'; Lee 45+1'; Tade 68'	Report	Randall 54'	Stadium: Kiwitea Street; Referee: Allan Wilson

=== Final ===
The finals was played on the 11 September 2022. The game featured two teams from the National League regional leagues (level 2), one of which also competed in the Championship phase (level 1).

11 September 2022
16:00

Auckland City (1)	1–0	Eastern Suburbs (2)
Manickum 56'	Report

North Harbour Stadium, Auckland
Attendance: 2,839
Referee: Ben O’Connell

== Notes ==
The tiers that teams are in (as indicated in brackets next to their name) are based on the New Zealand football league system for the 2022 season. As some teams can qualify and play in more than one league (and tier) per season, the highest tier that they take part in is the one noted next to their name.
