= Fletcher Cup =

New Zealand association football league competition

- Country: New Zealand
- Confederation: OFC (Oceania)
- Level on pyramid: 4
- Promotion to: Southern Premier League
- Domestic cup: Chatham Cup
- Current champions: Roslyn Wakari Reserves (5th title) (2026)
- Most championships: Dunedin Technical (7 titles)
- Website: FootballSouth

The Fletcher Cup (formerly known as Ultra Football Men's Division 1) is a New Zealand association football league competition administered by Southern Football involving clubs from the lower half of the South Island of New Zealand. All seven of the teams in the competition in 2025 with the exception of Mosgiel AFC — are from Dunedin, with several of them being second teams from clubs in higher divisions. The league sits at level 4 of the New Zealand football pyramid.

The winner of each season's league, if eligible, enters a playoff series with the winners of the Donald Gray Memorial Cup (Southland) and South Canterbury Division 1 (South Canterbury) for promotion into the Southern Premier League.

== Current clubs ==
As of 2026 season

Club	Home Ground(s)	Location	2026 season
Dunedin City Royals (3)	Culling Park	South Dunedin	5th
Grants Braes	Ocean Grove Sportsground	Ocean Grove, Dunedin	7th
Green Island (2)	Sunnyvale Park	Green Island, Dunedin	4th
Mosgiel (2)	Memorial Park Ground	Mosgiel	3rd
Northern (3)	Forrester Park	North East Valley, Dunedin	2nd
Otago University (2)	Dunedin Artificial Turf	Dunedin North, Dunedin	6th
Roslyn Wakari (2)†	Ellis Park	Kaikorai Valley, Dunedin	1st

† — known for sponsorship reasons as Motus Health Roslyn Wakari AFC
(2) and (3) — Denotes club's second or third team

== Champions ==
- 1998 - Dunedin Technical
- 1999 - Green Island
- 2000 - Caversham
- 2001 - Caversham
- 2002 - Caversham
- 2003 - Grants Braes
- 2004 - Roslyn-Wakari
- 2005 - Roslyn-Wakari
- 2006 - Otago University
- 2007 - Roslyn-Wakari
- 2008 - Dunedin Technical
- 2009 - Dunedin Technical
- 2010 - Roslyn-Wakari
- 2011 - Dunedin Technical
- 2012 - Dunedin Technical
- 2013 - Mosgiel
- 2014 - Caversham
- 2015 - Caversham
- 2016 - Caversham
- 2017 - Dunedin Technical
- 2018 - Dunedin Technical
- 2019 - Mosgiel
- 2020 - Otago University
- 2021 - Otago University
- 2022 - Roslyn-Wakari
- 2023 - Dunedin City Royals (3)
- 2024 - Old Boys'
- 2025 - Northern (2)
- 2026 - Roslyn-Wakari (2)
