= Wānaka FC =

- Full name: Wānaka Football Club
- Founded: 2010; 16 years ago as Wanaka AFC
- Ground: Wānaka Recreation Centre, Kelly's Flat, Wānaka
- Manager: Max Uhr
- League: Southern League
- 2026: Southern League, 9th of 10
- Website: wanakafootball.nz
Home colours

Wānaka FC is an association football club in Wānaka, New Zealand.

The club has several men's and women's teams across age-group levels, and has around 550 members. The club competes in the Southern League.

== History ==
The club's senior team competed in the Southern Premier League, from 2019 to 2024, in Level 3 of the New Zealand league system. Their traditional rivals and closest neighbours are Queenstown Rovers. Wanaka AFC has competed regularly in the country's top knock-out club competition, the Chatham Cup, since 2019, with their best performance coming in 2023, when they reached Round 4 (the last-16 stage of the competition) before being defeated 4–3 by Roslyn-Wakari.

In 2021, the club partnered with the Ole Football Academy to deliver the Olé x Wanaka AFC Academy, led by former All White Blair Scoullar. Three players from the academy have gone on to move to the Wellington Phoenix academy across 2025 and 2026

In 2024 the club finished second in the Southern Premier League. With Mosgiel AFC declining the opportunity at promotion, Wanaka as the next highest ranked team in the competition were handed the opportunity. They played Waimakariri United AFC in the play-off, winning 5–1 at home and 4–3 away for an aggregate 9-4 victory, earning them promotion to the 2023.

== Season by season record ==
2022-2024 (Southern Premiership)
2025- (Southern League)

Season	Southern League/Southern Premiership									National League									Chatham Cup	Top scorer	
Season	P	W	D	L	F	A	GD	Pts	Pos	P	W	D	L	F	A	GD	Pts	Pos	Chatham Cup	Name	Goals
2022	18	10	4	4	44	33	+11	34	3rd	Not eligible to qualify									R1	(New Zealand) Ethan Arratia	10
2023	18	7	5	6	27	25	+2	26	4th	Not eligible to qualify									R4	(New Zealand) Anthony Sprowson	6
2024	18	10	4	4	47	22	+25	34	2nd	Not eligible to qualify									R2	(New Zealand) Ethan Arratia	10
2025	18	5	0	13	23	58	-35	15	8th	Did not qualify									R4	(New Zealand) Edward Belingher	7
2026	18	3	1	14	18	73	-55	10	9th	Did not qualify									R3	(New Zealand) Wynn Skinner	5

== Honours ==
- Southern League promotion play-off winner: 2024
