= Waverley Park (disambiguation) =

Waverley Park is an Australian rules football stadium in Mulgrave, Victoria, Australia.

Waverley Park or Waverly Park may also refer to:

== Oceania ==
- Waverley Park, Invercargill, a sports venue in Invercargill, New Zealand

- Waverley Park School, a primary school in Invercargill, New Zealand

- Waverley Park (Oval) in Waverley, Sydney, home of Eastern Suburbs Cricket Club

== North America ==
- Waverley Park (Thunder Bay), a park in Ontario, Canada
- Waverly Park, a park in Waverly Hills, Louisville, Kentucky
- Waverly Park, a neighborhood of East Rockaway, New York
- Waverly Park or Waverly Fairgrounds, a baseball field in Newark, New Jersey
