= West End AFC =

- Full name: West End Association Football Club
- Ground: West End Park, Timaru
- Manager: Jimmy Wilox
- League: South Canterbury Division 1
- 2023: South Canterbury Division 1, 3rd of 4

West End AFC is an association football club in Timaru, New Zealand. The team home ground is West End Park, Timaru and they play in the South Canterbury 1st Division as well as enter into the National Chatham Cup.

West End AFC entered the Chatham Cup for the first time in 2009, completing a 9–0 win in their first game against Redemption before they lost to Queenstown 1–8 in the next round. West End did not enter the Chatham Cup again until 2014, where they again won their first game, this time against Southend United, before they went out in the second round against Pleasant Point. They have then completed in 2015 and 2016.

In 2017, West End entered again, first winning against Timaru Thistle in the qualifying round, then following it up with a 5–2 win over Queens Park in the first round, setting them up for a round 2 clash with Southern Premier League team Dunedin Technical. However they would go on to lose 6–0 to the higher placed team. In 2018 West End again could not get past the second round. Finally in the 2019 Chatham Cup they made the third round after winning against Mornington then Gore Wanderers on penalties, they lost to Mosgiel 5–0. However it was discovered that Mosgiel had fielded an ineligible player so New Zealand Football overturned the result and awarded the 3–0 win to West End. The reprieve was short-lived however, losing their next match 1–7 to Roslyn-Wakari. With no Chatham Cup in 2020, West End are continuing their streak of entering each year by participating in the 2021 Chatham Cup.

They are the largest junior club in South Canterbury with over 30 junior teams.

West End won the South Canterbury league a number of times in the 1950s and 1960s, most notably four times in a row from 1964 to 1967. They won the title again in 1989, following it up with three more titles in a four-year period in the 1990s. It was then another 18 years before they won another South Canterbury title in 2017, beating Thistle in the final double header round completing the season with only one loss, then in 2018 going back to back.
