= Grants Braes AFC =

- Full name: Grants Braes Association Football Club
- Nickname: Braes
- Founded: 1961
- Ground: Ocean Grove Sports Ground, Ocean Grove, Dunedin
- Coach: Scott Carrick
- League: Fletcher Cup
- 2026: Fletcher Cup, 7th of 7
Home colours

Grants Braes AFC is an amateur association football club in Dunedin, New Zealand. The club competes in the Fletcher Cup.

The Grants Braes AFC was founded as a junior Club on 11 January 1961. The team colours were black, gold and white. Otago Football Association addressed the letter confirming the Affiliation to Mr J Paterson of Waverly, Dunedin.

The Foundation Team was an 8th Grade Side. The players on that team were Trevor Wilson, Bruce Wright, Alan Keane, Ken Sheal, Derek Stewart, Phillip McDonnell, Stuart Smith, John Frew, Ross McKay, Murry Urquhart, Graham Bulling, and Paul Robertson. No coach was listed.

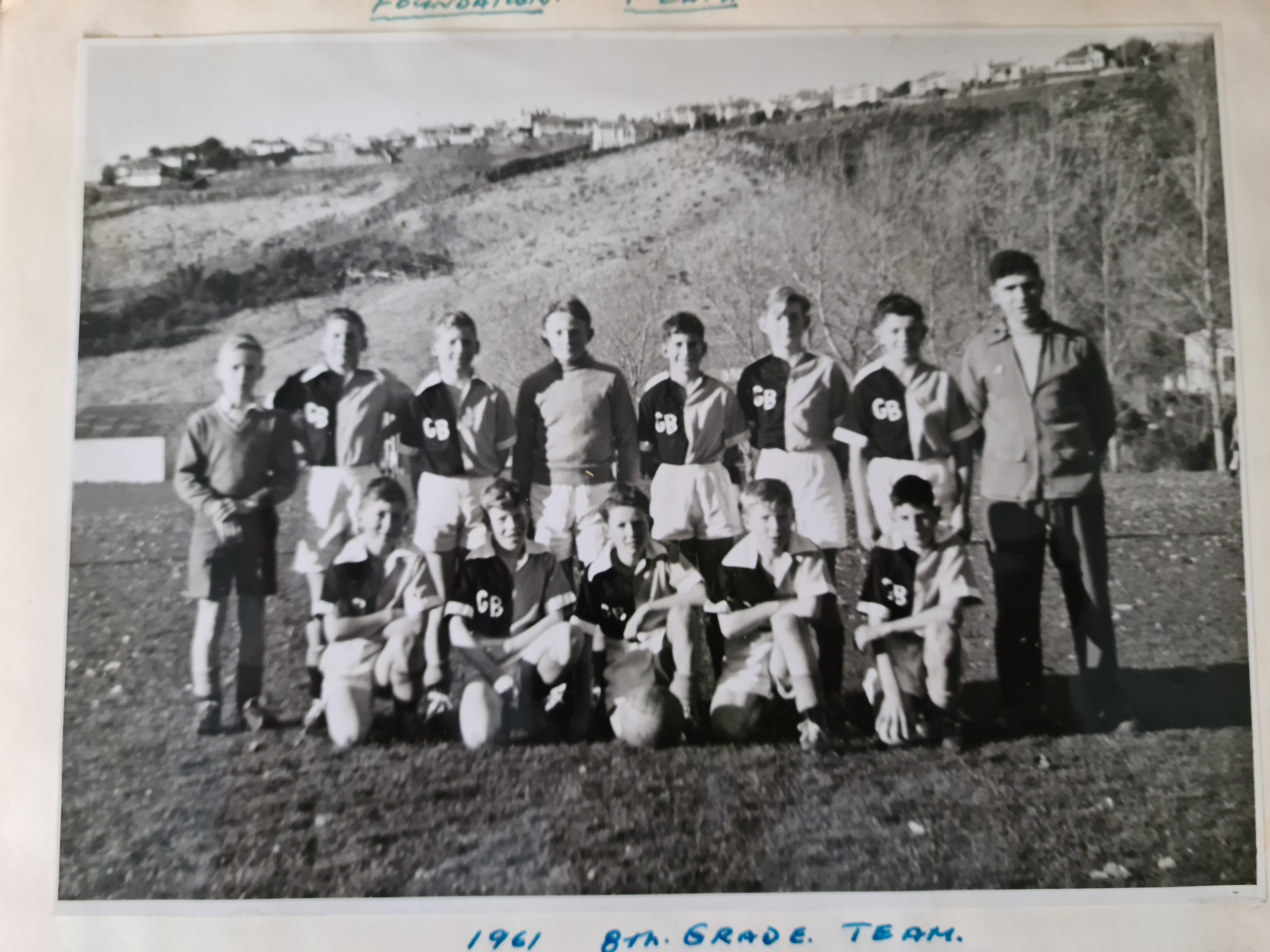
Grants Braes AFC 1961 8th Grade Team

== Junior club ==
Grants Braes entered five teams into the local 6th grade competition in 2019, three boys teams and two all girls sides. Further up the age grades Grants Braes AFC has an all girls team, the Smurfettes, in the 11th grade. The Smurfettes won their league in 2019 and only lost one competition game the entire season. Grants Braes AFC Tomahawks entered the local 14th grade competition in 2019.

== Senior club ==
As of 2026, Grants Braes AFC had seven senior teams competing in Southern Football's leagues, including five men's teams and two women's teams. Its Premier Men's team play in the Fletcher Cup as the only first-team side in the competition, while its Premier Women's team competes in the Billie Scott Cup.

Grants Braes AFC competed in the Southern Premier League from 2004 to 2013, but its highest finish was eighth place. Across the late 1980s and early 1990s, Grants Braes won four titles in the Otago Women's Premier League.

The club first entered the Chatham Cup in 1983 and has competed semi-regularly since. Its best performance came in 2018 when it defeated Geraldine and Old Boys' AFC en route to the fourth round, where it lost to Green Island FC.
