= South Canterbury United =

South Canterbury United was a football team from New Zealand. The team was initially formed in 1982 as a composite side containing players from Timaru City and Northern Hearts. Northern Hearts left the amalgamation in 1991, returning to their former name; Timaru City did the same in 1996. United continued as a separate side until 2008 before folding. They played in the Soccersouth Premier League, and played their home games at Sir Basil Arthur Park in Timaru.
