= Southern Premier League (New Zealand) =

ODT Southern Football Premier League
- Country: New Zealand
- Confederation: OFC (Oceania)
- Number of clubs: 9
- Level on pyramid: 3
- Promotion to: Southern League
- Relegation to: Donald Gray Memorial Cup; South Canterbury Division One; Fletcher Cup
- Domestic cup: Chatham Cup
- Current champions: Northern Hearts (1st title) (2026)
- Most championships: Caversham (15 titles)
- Website: Southern Football

The Southern Premier League (known as the ODT Southern Men's Premier League for sponsorship reasons) is a New Zealand association football league competition administered by Southern Football involving clubs from the lower half of the South Island of New Zealand. Five of the clubs are from Dunedin, two from Invercargill and one each are from Mosgiel and Timaru.

The league has also previously included an Otago youth development team. There is currently a U-15 Development League that runs alongside the competition.

Until 2009, the league was known as the SoccerSouth Premier League. Since the inception of the competition, it has been dominated by Dunedin City Royals and the two predecessor teams which merged to form that club, Caversham AFC and Dunedin Technical.

The league was expanded from eight to ten clubs at the start of the 2022 season, with the addition of teams from Timaru and Invercargill.

As of 2022, the winner of the southern premier league has the option to play in the Southern League Playoff, a two-leg home and away series against the Mainland Football Playoff winner, else Southern Football could nominate a club to participate in the playoff series. The winner of the Southern League Playoff will be promoted to the Southern League, assuming they will have the correct club licensing before the season starts.

The team placed last in the Southern Premier League is automatically relegated to its appropriate regional league. The winners of Fletcher Cup (Otago), Donald Gray Memorial Cup (Southland) and South Canterbury Division 1 (South Canterbury) play in a play off for promotion into the Southern Premier League.

== Current clubs ==
Location of clubs in the South Island for the 2025 Southern Men's Premier League season
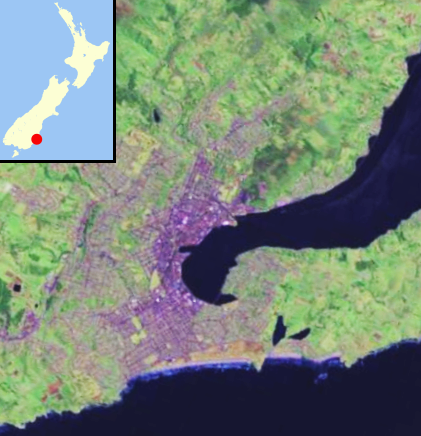
Location of clubs in Dunedin for the 2025 Southern Men's Premier League season

Teams contesting the 2026 season

Club	Home ground	Location	2026 season
Dunedin City Royals (2)	Tahuna Park	Dunedin North, Dunedin	7th
Green Island	Sunnyvale Park	Green Island, Dunedin	9th
Mosgiel	Memorial Park Ground	Mosgiel	2nd
Northern (2)	Caledonian Ground	Dunedin North, Dunedin	4th
Northern Hearts	Aorangi Park	Timaru	1st
Old Boys	ILT Football Turf	Invercargill	6th
Otago University	Dunedin Artificial Turf	Dunedin North, Dunedin	3rd
Queens Park	ILT Football Turf	Invercargill	5th
Roslyn-Wakari	Ellis Park	Kaikorai Valley, Dunedin	8th

(2) — Denotes club's second team, ineligible for promotion to the Southern League

== Past clubs ==
Club	First Season	Last Season	Best Finish	Total Seasons	Notes
Waihopai	2000	2000	9th (2000)	1	
South Canterbury United	2005	2007	5th (2007)	3	Temporary merger of Northern Hearts and Timaru City
Otago Youth	2006	2009	8th (2008)	4	Formerly Soccersouth Youth
Southland Spirit	2001	2011	2nd (2001)	11	
Grants Braes	2004	2013	8th (2010)	10	
Southland United	2000	2019	3rd (2018)	4	
Caversham	2000	2020	1st (2017)	21	Merged to form Dunedin City Royals
Dunedin Technical	2000	2020	1st (2018)	21	Merged to form Dunedin City Royals
South City Royals	2021	2021	1st (2021)	1	Now Dunedin City Royals
Mosgiel (2)	2022	2022	7th (2022)	1	
Green Island (2)	2022	2023	10th (2022)	2	
Queenstown	2001	2024	2nd (2018)	22	Formerly Queenstown Rovers
Wānaka	2019	2024	2nd (2024)	6	
Northern	2000	2025	1st (2025)	26	

(2) — Denotes club's second team

== Champions ==
- 2000 – Caversham
- 2001 – Caversham
- 2002 – Caversham
- 2003 – Roslyn-Wakari
- 2004 – Caversham
- 2005 – Caversham
- 2006 – Caversham
- 2007 – Caversham
- 2008 – Caversham
- 2009 – Caversham
- 2010 – Caversham
- 2011 – Dunedin Technical
- 2012 – Caversham
- 2013 – Dunedin Technical
- 2014 – Caversham
- 2015 – Caversham
- 2016 – Caversham
- 2017 – Caversham
- 2018 – Dunedin Technical
- 2019 – Mosgiel
- 2020 – Green Island
- 2021 – South City Royals (Note: Now known as Dunedin City Royals)
- 2022 – Dunedin City Royals (2)
- 2023 – Mosgiel
- 2024 – Mosgiel
- 2025 – Northern
- 2026 – Northern Hearts

(2) — Denotes club's second team

Club	Number of Titles	Year(s) Won
Caversham	15	2000, 2001, 2002, 2004, 2005, 2006, 2007, 2008, 2009, 2010, 2012, 2014, 2015, 2016, 2017
Dunedin Technical	3	2011, 2013, 2018
Mosgiel	3	2019, 2023, 2024
Dunedin City Royals (Note: First tile as South City Royals, Second title won by the Reserve team.)	2	2021, 2022
Roslyn-Wakari	1	2003
Green Island	1	2020
Northern	1	2025
Northern Hearts	1	2026
