= Les Groves =

New Zealand sportsman (1911–1990)

- Born: 9 June 1911; Dunedin, Otago, New Zealand
- Died: 4 September 1990 (aged 79); Dunedin, Otago, New Zealand
- Cricket career

Cricket information
- Batting: Right-handed
- Bowling: Right-arm leg break

Domestic team information
- Years: Team
- 1929/30–1949/50: Otago

Career statistics
Competition	First-class
Matches	16
Runs scored	297
Batting average	11.42
100s/50s	0/0
Top score	35
Balls bowled	2,231
Wickets	31
Bowling average	42.09
5 wickets in innings	1
10 wickets in match	0
Best bowling	6/88
Catches/stumpings	8/–
- Source: Cricinfo, 30 October 2026
Association football career
Senior career*
Years	Team	Apps	(Gls)
- Invercargill HSOB
International career
1933	New Zealand	2	(0)
- * Club domestic league appearances and goals

Leslie Joseph Groves (9 June 1911 – 4 September 1990) was a New Zealand sportsman. In association football he represented New Zealand in two matches at international level. In cricket, he played 16 first-class matches for Otago between the 1929–30 and 1949–50 seasons.

Groves was born at Dunedin in 1911 and educated there at Otago Boys' High School. He worked as a manager.

Groves played association football for Otago and represented the New Zealand national football team. He played two official A-international matches for the All Whites in 1933 against trans-Tasman neighbours Australia as part of a 13 match tour of Australia, the first a 2–4 loss on 5 June 1933, his second another 2–4 loss on 24 June.

Groves played cricket sporadically for Otago in a career of 16 first-class matches spread over 20 years. A leg-spin bowler, he took his best figures of 6 for 88 and 3 for 46 against the touring Fijian team in 1947–48, helping Otago to victory by 47 runs.

Groves served with the New Zealand Army in Italy in the Second World War as a private. Following his death in 1990 obituaries were published in the 1991 New Zealand Cricket Almanack and the 1991 Wisden.
