= Waverley Park, Invercargill =

Park and sports venue in New Zealand

Coordinates: 46°23′57″S 168°22′41″E

Waverley Park
- Interactive map of Waverley Park
- Address: New Zealand
- Location: Invercargill, New Zealand

Waverley Park is a sports ground in the suburb of Glengarry, in the northwest of the city of Invercargill, New Zealand. It covers 6.30 hectares (15.6 acres).

The park's facilities are shared by four local sports, and it is the home ground for Old Boys' AFC and Star RFC. The Waverley Bowling Club is located in the park's northwestern corner, and the park is also used for matches in the Invercargill Cricket League. Facilities at the park include two football fields, two rugby fields, and two bowling greens.

The part is popular with joggers, and has several trails especially for walkers, joggers, and hikers. Maintenance of the ground is overseen by Invercargill City Council.

The park shares its name with the nearby Waverley Park School, a primary school located 250 metres to the northeast of the park.
