= Glengarry, New Zealand =

Suburb of Invercargill

Glengarry
- Suburb
- Interactive map of Glengarry
- Coordinates: 46.403°S 168.385°E
- Country: New Zealand
- City: Invercargill
- Local authority: Invercargill City Council

Area
  - Land: 233 ha (580 acres)

Population (June 2025)
  - Total: 3,510
  - Density: 1,510/km^{2} (3,900/sq mi)

Windsor	Waverley	Ascot
	Glengarry	Mill Road
Richmond	Hawthorndale

Glengarry is a suburb in the New Zealand city of Invercargill.

In a 2019 op-ed in the Southland Times, a woman who was brought up in Glengarry said the community "reflected the United Nations" with its diversity, and people were wrong to associate life in Glengarry with the impoverished lifestyles reflected in the film Once Were Warriors.

It has hosted a range of events, including the Invercargill Fire and Light Show and Summer Sounds Concert.

The suburb contains two sports grounds, Surrey Park and Waverley Park.

== History ==
In 1976, Stephen Thomas established a service station on bare land in the Glengarry area. He sold the business in 2018.

In 2014, Eastside Baptist Church in Glengarry recorded increasing demand for its free Wednesday meals.

In 2016, Invercargill City Council removed a public Christmas tree one week after it was installed due to vandalism. The tree had been vandalised three times, the fairy lights wiring had been cut in several places, many baubles had been destroyed, and the damage was too expensive to continue repairing.

In 2019, Invercargill deputy mayor Becs Amundsen said she had entered politics because she felt Invercargill City Council had not provided enough support for the rejuvenation of Glengarry.

== Demographics ==
Glengarry covers 2.33 km^{2} (0.90 sq mi) and had an estimated population of 3,510 as of June 2025, with a population density of 1,506 people per km^{2}.

Historical population
Year	Pop.	±% p.a.
2006	2,307	—
2013	2,352	+0.28%
2018	2,637	+2.31%

Before the 2023 census, Glengarry had a smaller boundary, covering 2.05 km^{2} (0.79 sq mi). Using that boundary, Glengarry had a population of 2,637 at the 2018 New Zealand census, an increase of 285 people (12.1%) since the 2013 census, and an increase of 330 people (14.3%) since the 2006 census. There were 1,065 households, comprising 1,257 males and 1,380 females, giving a sex ratio of 0.91 males per female. The median age was 36.4 years (compared with 37.4 years nationally), with 585 people (22.2%) aged under 15 years, 501 (19.0%) aged 15 to 29, 981 (37.2%) aged 30 to 64, and 570 (21.6%) aged 65 or older.

Ethnicities were 82.9% European/Pākehā, 21.0% Māori, 4.3% Pasifika, 4.4% Asian, and 2.2% other ethnicities. People may identify with more than one ethnicity.

The percentage of people born overseas was 10.9, compared with 27.1% nationally.

Although some people chose not to answer the census's question about religious affiliation, 51.9% had no religion, 34.9% were Christian, 0.8% had Māori religious beliefs, 0.2% were Hindu, 0.7% were Muslim, 0.1% were Buddhist and 1.7% had other religions.

Of those at least 15 years old, 201 (9.8%) people had a bachelor's or higher degree, and 621 (30.3%) people had no formal qualifications. The median income was $24,600, compared with $31,800 nationally. 147 people (7.2%) earned over $70,000 compared to 17.2% nationally. The employment status of those at least 15 was that 888 (43.3%) people were employed full-time, 291 (14.2%) were part-time, and 93 (4.5%) were unemployed.
