= Turnbull Thomson Park =

Park in New Zealand

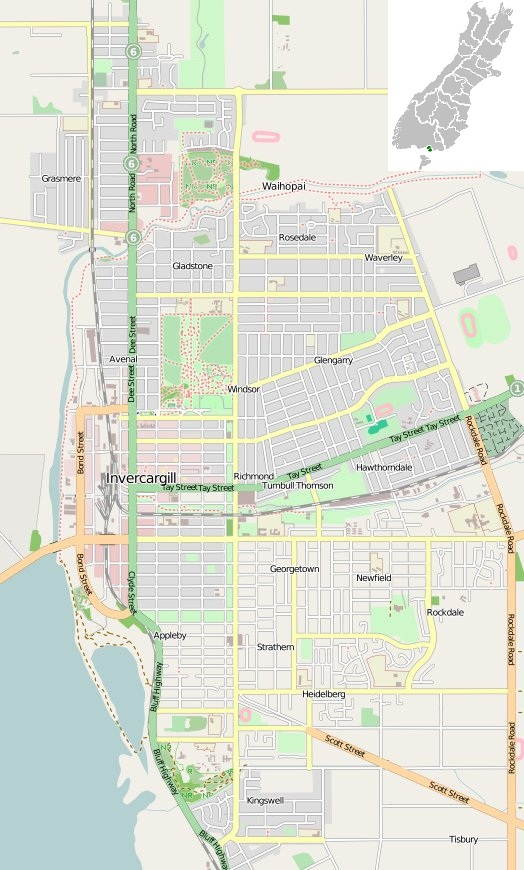
- Location within Invercargill
- Type: Public park
- Location: Invercargill, Southland, South Island, New Zealand
- Coordinates: 46°24′50″S 168°22′19″E
- Area: 40 hectares (99 acres)
- Created: 1933
- Operator: Invercargill City Council Parks Division
- Open: All Year
- Status: Minor Park

Turnbull Thomson Park is a public park located in Invercargill, Southland, South Island, New Zealand. It is within the region of Southland Plains, covered with grass on low flatland with some trees around the large open space. The park is mainly used for sports and recreation purposes. As a natural reserve, it also has unique environmental and scenic value to the city.

== Turnbull Thomson Park today ==
The park is a sports venue and a tourist attraction surrounded by local residential areas. On the south west corner is Rugby Park Stadium, a privately operated sports ground. To its northwest are Otakaro Park and Queen's Park.

The Main South railway line and Otepuni Stream bisect the reserve in the middle. A band of industrial segment on Otepuni Avenue separates the two eastern parts of the park. On the corner of Lindisfarne Street and Otepuni Avenue sits a sewerage pumping station, part of the Invercargill city cleaning system set up by John Turnbull Thomson.

Environment Southland manages two pieces of land in and adjacent to the reserve. One is in the center next to the railway line and another in the northwest borders the reserve.

=== Maintenance ===
The park is maintained by the Invercargill city council. The Parks Division is responsible for the development, maintenance and general management of the park, including control over eradication of weeds. Each club is responsible for its own building and car park maintenance. The stop bank is maintained by Environment Southland. The Roading Division of the Invercargill City Council is responsible for the maintenance of the walking/cycling track. Children's playground equipments receive routine checks by the city council to meet the New Zealand Safety Standard for Playgrounds.

=== Landscaping and facilities ===
The main entrance to the park is off Lindisfarne Street. The park is divided by Lindisfarne street and the railway line into four sections.

The park hosts the headquarters of a number of indoor sporting and recreational organisations and provides signed car parks. A walking and cycling track runs through it. In 2010, a new tigerturf football pitch partly filled with rubber and sand was added to better handle the wet weather. Funding was from the council, ILT Foundation, the Invercargill Licensing Trust (ILT) and the Community Trust of Southland. The upgrade included development of a full football field, Southland Football pavilion refurbishment and a training area.

There are some adjoining areas with the residential, private and industrial communities. Apart from holding sports events as its formal usage, the park provided green areas for the city and entertainment for the citizens, such as firework display. The park has many children's playground areas and is also a 'Dog Exercise Area' as defined by the Dog Control Policy, which means dogs can run off lead but under the control of the owner. The council is also expecting to further develop soccer and hockey fields.

Residential Clubs List

The park roughly has four quadrants, and each quadrant has its own unique characteristics. They all have club or association buildings on site; some parts provide casual play areas and shelters to keep visitors from the wind and rain.

South East Quadrant

- Collegiate Rugby Football Club - RUGBY

South West Quadrant

- Marist Old Boys' Rugby Club - RUGBY
- Marist Cricket Club - CRICKET
- Southland Table Tennis Association - TABLE TENNIS
- Southland Dog Obedience Club - DOG OBEDIENCE

North East Quadrant

- Bowls Southland - BOWLS
- Southland Football - FOOTBALL
- He Tauaa Rugby League Club - RUGBY LEAGUE
- Casual Use - GOLF
- Casual Use - PLAYGROUND

North West Quadrant

- Metropolitan Cricket Club - CRICKET
- Eastern Hawks Rugby Club - RUGBY
- Southland Touch Association - TOUCH
- Invercargill Smallbore Rifle Association - SMALLBORE RIFLE
- Invercargill Poultry and Pigeon Club - POULTRY AND PIGEON CLUB
- Southland Darts Association - DARTS
- Invercargill Contract Bridge Club - BRIDGE
- Invercargill Caledonian Pipe Band - PIPE BAND
- Casual Use - SKATEBOARDING

== History ==
Around 70% of the park was given to Invercargill city as a gift together with further monetary donations in 1933 by daughters of John Turnbull Thomson, who was the first Surveyor General of New Zealand. The money was used to buy trees and shrubs for the park.

Turnbull Thomson Park was used for growing crops during World War II. The cultivation of the land helped to improve the condition of the soil.

Over the years, other areas and facilities were added to the main area by the council, such as land, shelters, clubrooms and bridges. In 1965 the Turnbull Thomson Pavilion was built and managed by Turnbull Thomson Management Committee since. During the 1960s and 1970s a tree nursery was added for growing shelter trees for the city's reserves. During roughly the same time period, most sports buildings were built for team activities. In the 90s, a skateboard park was built by Environment Southland when the stop banks were being constructed. In the late 90s, some professional murals were created to beautify the buildings by the collaborative effort of several associations to help combat problems with graffiti.

A walking and cycling track running from Inglewood Road to Elles Road was added in 2003. It was maintained by the Invercargill City Council Roading Division and funded by the Land Transport Funding Programme.

== Activities ==
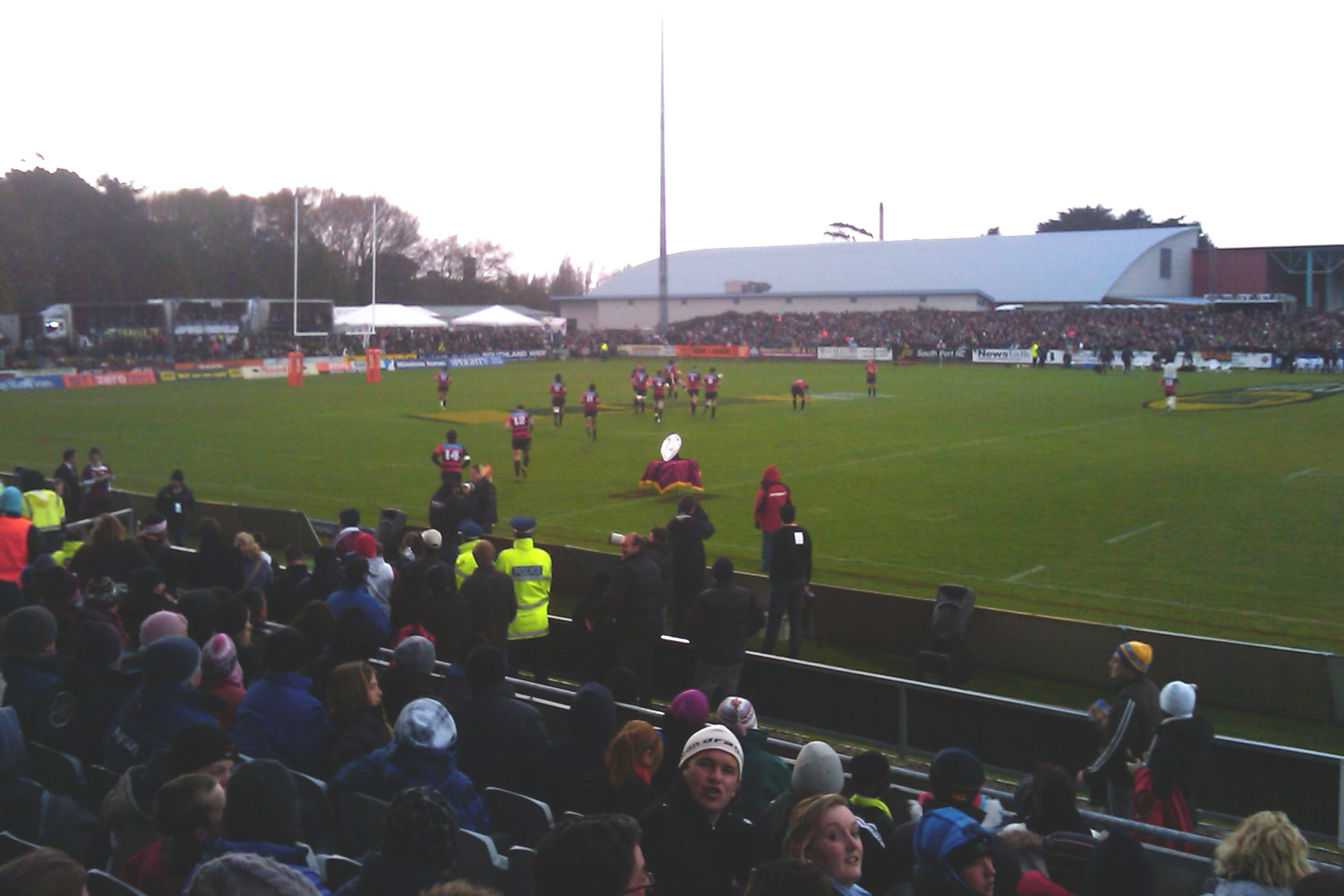
Rugby Park Stadium next to the park where Spirit FC is a tenant

The main usage of the park include sports, passive recreations, commercial promotions, festival activities, circuses, competitions, public demonstrations and ceremonies.

- Sports Football teams Southland Spirit FC and Queens Park A.F.C. are based in the park. Rugby team Southland Stags Team also train on the new pitch.
- Recreations The park has a grass field and walking lanes for walking, running and cycling. Children's playgrounds are safe and regularly maintained. Dog walking is allowed under the supervision of the pet owner.
- Entertainment Firework displays sometimes are arranged in the park, but open fires outside a BBQ gas container are not allowed.
- Club activities Many clubs host their group activities in the park.

== Environment ==
The park is subject to the south oceanic and local microclimate of Invercargill and often has inclement weather. Before humans arrived, this area was covered by forest. However, much of it was burnt down by Polynesians around 1250–1300 AD. European settlers have planted grass since 1850.

== Miscellaneous ==
The trees in the park tend to produce dead leaves scattering around the field and sometimes get blown to the residential areas, which is considered as inconvenient. There are also people in the park collecting firewood, pine cones and twigs. Graffiti seems to be a persistent problem.

== See also ==
- Queen's Park, Invercargill
