= Green Island FC =

Green Island AFC
- Full name: Green Island Association Football Club
- Founded: 1896
- Ground: Sunnyvale Park, Green Island, Dunedin
- Coach: Jared White
- League: Southern Premier League
- 2026: Southern Premier League, 9th of 9
Home colours

Green Island is an amateur association football club in Green Island, Dunedin, New Zealand. The club competes in the Southern Premier League and most recently won the league in 2020. From 2021-23 they played in the Southern League (tier 2)

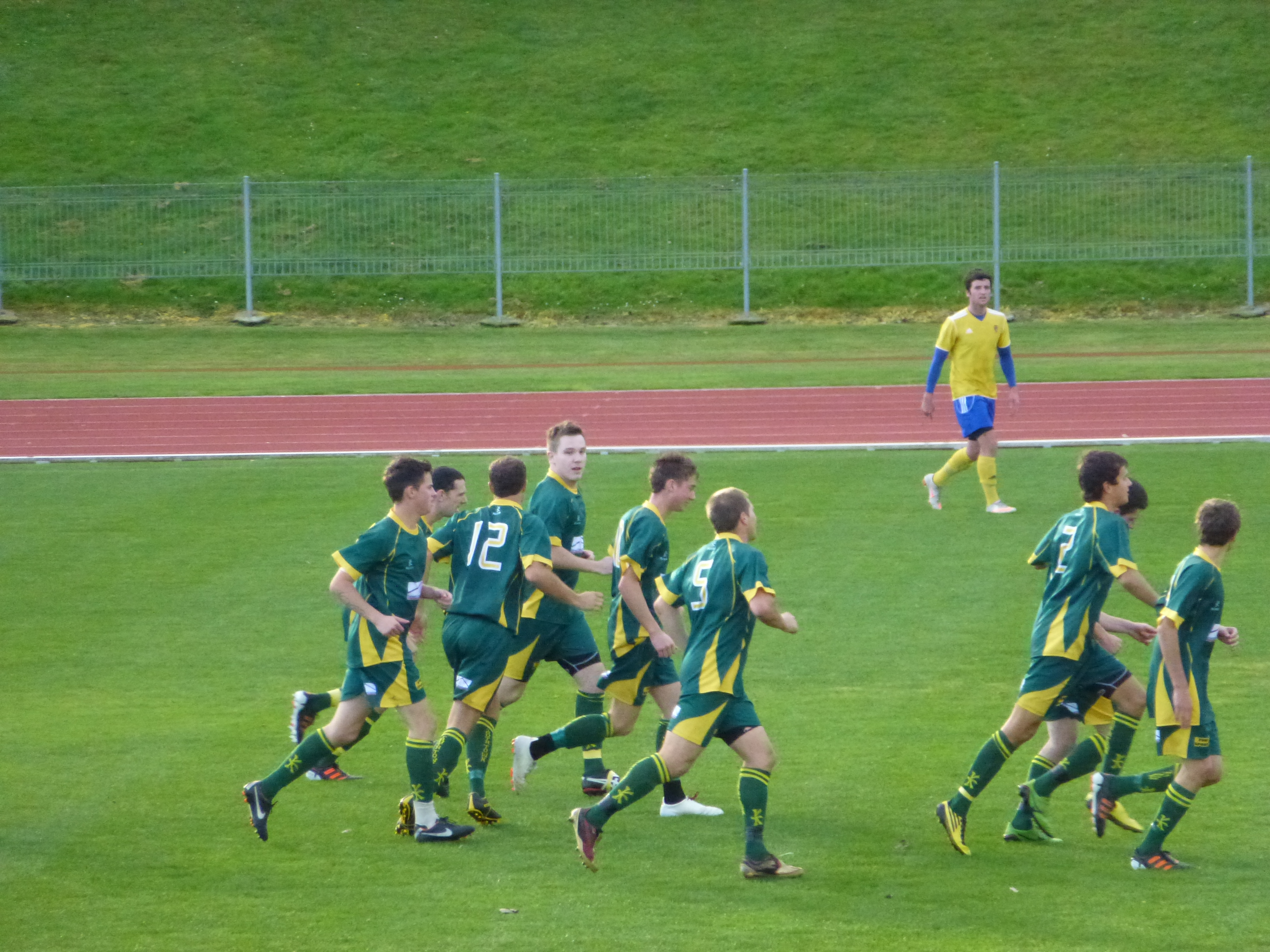
Celebrating a goal

The Green Island Association Football Club was first formed and accepted into the Otago Football Association in 1896 as the Green Island Football club situated at Harroways ground, Burnside. Disbanded during the war years and reformed in the late 1940s. The clubrooms were situated at Miller Park until the Abbotsford slip in 1979 forced the club to move to its present site at Sunnyvale.

Green Island's women's team has enjoyed success in recent years too, winning the Women's Southern Premiership in three consecutive years from 2024 to 2026

== Season by season record ==
2021–2023 (National League)
2024- (Southern Premiership)

Season	Southern League									National League									Chatham Cup	Top scorer	
Season	P	W	D	L	F	A	GD	Pts	Pos	P	W	D	L	F	A	GD	Pts	Pos	Chatham Cup	Name	Goals
2021	7	1	1	5	11	27	-16	4	8th	Did not qualify									R3	(New Zealand) Adam Hewson, (New Zealand) Cam Anderson	4
2022	18	4	1	13	27	61	-34	13	8th	Did not qualify									R4	(New Zealand) Ryan Stanley	6
2023	18	5	1	12	33	58	-25	16	8th	Did not qualify									R3	(Canada) Stefan Milidrag	9
Southern Premier League										National League											
2024	18	6	3	9	35	48	-13	21	7th	Not eligible to qualify									R2	(New Zealand) Finlay Kruger	9
2025	16	4	2	10	27	51	-24	14	7th	Not eligible to qualify									R2	(New Zealand) Ryan Walker	6
2026	16	3	3	16	15	29	-14	12	9th	Not eligible to qualify									R1	(New Zealand) Callum Gillies, (New Zealand) Ryan Walker	3

Playoffs
Season	Division	P	W	D	L	GF	GA	Aggregate	Against
Senior (Men's)
2021	SL Relegation	2	1	1	0	7	4	7–4	Mosgiel
