= Old Boys' AFC =

- Full name: Old Boys' Association Football Club
- Nickname: Reds
- Founded: 1959
- Ground: Waverley Park, Glengarry, Invercargill
- League: Southern Premier League
- 2026: Southern Premier League, 6th of 9
Home colours

Old Boys' Association Football Club is a junior and senior football club based in the southern New Zealand city of Invercargill. The club competes in the Southern Premier League.

Old Boys' was founded in 1959 by a small group of Southland Boys' High School old boys – hence the club's name. In 1960 the old Brigadiers AFC clubrooms were purchased at Waverley Park. The current clubrooms were built by volunteer labour and were completed in 1979.

Old Boys' is a regular entrant to the Chatham Cup, recording its best season in 2009, when it reached the last 32 stage of the competition. It currently plays in the Donald Gray League, the premiere men's football grade in Southland. The team has won the Southland Region's Donald Gray Memorial Cup on six occasions.

Old Boys won promotion to the FootballSouth Premier League for the 2013 season. They were the only Invercargill side in the league since Southland Spirit FC pulled out at the end of 2011. A 9th-place finish saw the side relegated from the competition.

With close to 300 registered junior and senior players Old Boys' has become the largest football club in Southland.

The club entered a team in the Fletcher Cup for the first time in 2024 while maintaining status in the Donald Grey Memorial Cup.

After winning the Fletcher Cup, Old Boys' met Queenstown AFC in a one-match promotion/relegation match for a spot in the 2025 Southern Premier League. Old Boys' subsequently won the match, and were promoted back to the third tier of NZ football for the first time since 2013, the clubs only previous season at that level.

Old Boys have been working with other residents at Waverley Park (Star Rugby Club and Waverley Bowling Club) as part of the Waverley Hub, which included a football-rugby double header and shared after-match functions.

== Season by season record ==
2024 (Fletcher Cup)
2025- (Southern Premiership)

Season	Fletcher Cup/Southern Premiership									Chatham Cup	Top scorer	
Season	P	W	D	L	F	A	GD	Pts	Pos	Chatham Cup	Name	Goals
2024	18	13	4	4	53	34	+19	46	1st	Did not enter	(New Zealand) Aaron Fernandez Caceres	12
2025	16	1	0	15	20	64	-44	3	9th	R1	(New Zealand) William Fleming	7
2026	16	6	1	9	25	43	-18	19	6th	R32	(New Zealand) William Fleming	7

== Notable players ==
- Bill Chapman (Invercargill HSOB)
- Les Groves (Invercargill HSOB)
