= Northern Hearts AFC =

Northern Hearts
- Full name: Northern Hearts Association Football Club
- Nickname: Hearts
- Founded: 1947
- Ground: Aorangi Park, Timaru
- Coach: Ryan Hanifin
- League: Southern Premier League
- 2026: Southern Premier League, 1st of 9
Home colours

Northern Hearts is an association football club based in Timaru, New Zealand. The club was founded in 1947 and from 1982 to 1990 was amalgamated with Timaru City as South Canterbury United. It reverted to Northern Hearts in 1991. The club competes in the Southern Premier League.

Northern Hearts competed in the various Southern Premier leagues from 1971 to the mid-2000s. The club's best end-of-season position came in 2026, when they finished as league champions.

Northern Hearts first competed for the Chatham Cup in 1947.

Northern Hearts best Chatham Cup performance came in 1980, when it reached the last 16 before losing 2–5 to eventual finalists Dunedin City.

After a 14-year absence of South Canterbury clubs in the Southern Premier League, Northern Hearts were admitted to the league in the 2023 season after winning back-to-back titles in South Canterbury's Division One.

In 2026, the club secured its landmark first title at federation level, winning the Southern Premiership title despite having not finished higher than eighth in the four seasons prior. The 2026 season also saw Hearts net a trio of awards at Southern Football's prizegiving - forward Kowin Hancock was awarded the Golden Boot, while long-serving striker Bailey Chambers won the Attacker of the Year award and head coach Ryan Hanifin was selected as the Coach of the Year award winner.

== Season by season record ==
2022- Southern Premiership

Season	Southern Premiership									Chatham Cup	Top scorer	
Season	P	W	D	L	F	A	GD	Pts	Pos	Chatham Cup	Name	Goals
2022	18	5	0	13	37	58	-21	15	8th	Did not participate	(New Zealand) Bailey Chambers	17
2023	18	3	5	10	24	45	-21	14	10th	R1	(New Zealand) Bailey Chambers	14
2024	18	2	5	11	21	50	-29	11	9th	R2	(New Zealand) Bailey Chambers	12
2025	16	2	3	11	25	62	-37	9	8th	R2	(New Zealand) Bailey Chambers	9
2026	16	11	2	3	43	26	+14	35	1st	R1	(New Zealand) Howin Hancock	14
