= Queenstown AFC =

- Full name: Queenstown Association Football Club
- Nickname: Rovers
- Founded: 1983
- Ground: Queenstown Events Centre, Queenstown
- Coach: Danniel Bocatios
- League: FootballSouth Premier League
- 2023: FootballSouth Premier League, 9th of 10
Home colours

Queenstown AFC is an amateur association football club in Queenstown, New Zealand, they are currently playing in the Central Lakes Football League, having previously played in the Southern Premier League.

Their home games are played at the Frankton Events Centre.

Queenstown are five-times winners of the Donald Gray Memorial Cup, the premier tournament in football in Southland, New Zealand.

== Club history ==
The team gained notoriety in May 2007 when a brawl erupted during a Chatham Cup match between Queenstown and Invercargill club Queens Park which was fierce enough for local police to become involved.

In 2020 the club won the Football South Championship.

The club competed in the Southern Premier League from 2001 until 2024, with two years break in 2015 and 2016. It has competed in the Chatham Cup on an intermittent basis since 1983, reaching the last sixteen in 2016 and 2017.

Its best performance was a second-place finish in 2018, which earned it a place in the 2018 Southern League, which it finished fifth in.

In 2024, after finishing bottom of the Southern Premier League, the club played Old Boys' AFC for a place in the 2025 competition, which it lost 2-0, resulting in its' relegation.
