= Roslyn-Wakari AFC =

Roslyn-Wakari
- Full name: Roslyn-Wakari Association Football Club
- Founded: 1888; 138 years ago, as Wakari AFC
- Ground: Ellis Park, Dunedin, New Zealand
- President: Nigel Benn; Dan Todd
- Head Coach: Lance Woods (Men) Arnon Tapp (Women)
- League: Southern Premier League
- 2026: Southern Premier League, 7th of 9
Home colours

Roslyn-Wakari Association Football Club is an association football club based in Dunedin, New Zealand. The club competes in the Southern Premier League.

== History ==
The club's history began in 1888 when the Wakari Football Association first played in the local Dunedin league. This was only 44 years after the foundation of Dunedin, and the club is one of the oldest existing football clubs in the country (the oldest, North Shore United, was founded in 1886). The Wakari AFC consisted of 14 members with 11 or 12 playing members. The first committee included Sir Robert Stout (Premier of NZ 1884–1897) as its president. The club obtained a farmer's paddock and a ditch was dug as the perimeter for the pitch, outside the ditch the ball was out.

In 1890 the Wakari AFC changed its name to Roslyn AFC. In 1895 the Roslyn AFC split into two clubs with the second becoming Wakari AFC. The next ten years saw friendly rivalry between the two clubs as they competed for the "Otago Banner". In 1904 the two clubs amalgamated to become Roslyn-Wakari AFC. The club went into recess from 1914 until 1929 when they re-entered the Otago Football Association competition.

Roslyn-Wakari is one of Dunedin's weaker club sides in recent years. The team reached the semi-finals of the Chatham Cup in 1968 and 1995 along with reaching the quarterfinals in 2006 and 2023. Their senior men's team currently plays in the Southern Premier League. It won the competition in 2003, and finished second on six occasions since then

The home ground for the club is Ellis Park in Kaikorai Valley. Ellis Park was developed on an old tip site. In 1949 clubrooms were developed in the old stables which housed the horses which pulled the rubbish carts that filled in the grounds. Some of the wood used in modifying the old stables came from the demolition of an open-air swimming pool at the end of the top training ground in the Kaikorai Stream. The horse's head was adopted as the club's logo in recognition of this fact. These clubrooms were burnt down as a fire brigade exercise when the club built the present clubrooms/gym/changing rooms facilities in 1971.

== Players ==
Men's Southern Premier League
No.	Pos.	Player
1	GK	Tom Stevens
2	DEF	Ned Harris
2	MID	Giovani Pribaz
3	DEF	Ben Sallisbury
4	DEF	Shay Thom
5	DEF	Tom Connor
6	DEF	Tom Bealin
7	MID	Ben Reeve
8	MID	Luke Tolo-Kent
9	FWD	Simba Muwunganirwa
10	DEF	Callum Smith
11	DEF	Luke Sallisbury
12	FWD	Lewis Wall
13	FWD	Ben Williams-Davies
14	FWD	Nathan Wilkie
15	DEF	Jasper Moy
16	MID	Nick Treadwell
17	DEF	Josh Marshall
18	MID	Harry Hawken
19	MID	Fraser Anderson
20	DEF	Oscar Black

== Season by season record ==
2022- (Southern Premiership)

Season	Southern Premiership									Chatham Cup	Top scorer	
Season	P	W	D	L	F	A	GD	Pts	Pos	Chatham Cup	Name	Goals
2022	18	12	2	4	45	19	+26	38	2nd	R2	(New Zealand) Max Johnston	12
2023	18	12	5	1	39	16	+23	41	2nd	QF	(New Zealand) Nathan Wilkie	16
2024	18	8	4	6	38	32	+6	28	6th	R3	(New Zealand) Nathan Wilkie	17
2025	16	8	2	6	32	31	+1	26	4th	R1	(New Zealand) Ben Williams-Davies	11
2026	16	4	3	9	21	28	-7	15	8th	R1	(New Zealand) Nathan Wilkie	8

== Notable players and club members ==
- Robert Stout (1844–1930), New Zealand politician
- Howard Broad (born 1957), New Zealand commissioner of Police
- Michael McGarry (born 1965), New Zealand footballer
- Graham Marshall, New Zealand footballer
- Clare Taylor (born 1965), English sportswoman
- Thomas Robins, New Zealand actor
- Kelly Brazier (born 1989), New Zealand rugby union player
