= Mosgiel AFC =

- Full name: Mosgiel Association Football Club
- Nickname: The Plainsmen
- Founded: 1913
- Ground: Memorial Park, Mosgiel
- Capacity: 3000
- League: Southern Premier League
- 2026: Southern Premier League, 2nd of 9
Home colours	Away colours

Mosgiel AFC is a Semi-Professional association football club in Mosgiel, New Zealand. They currently compete in the Southern Premier League.

== Club history ==
The club was formed in 1913 and is based at Memorial Park. The club provides teams for men, women and juniors at all levels. The club's nickname, The Plainsmen, comes from Mosgiel's location on the Taieri Plains.

Mosgiel have twice reached the final of the Chatham Cup, in 1938 and 1940, but have never won the competition. In more recent times their best performance has been to reach the last 16 of the competition in 1985, 2005 and 2015.

== Present day ==
The club currently plays in the Southern Premier League. They have been crowned champions in 2018, 2023 and 2024 while also competing in the Southern League during the 2022 season.

== 2025 Squad ==
Note: Flags indicate national team as defined under FIFA eligibility rules; some limited exceptions apply. Players may hold more than one non-FIFA nationality.

No.	Pos.	Nation	Player
20	GK	NZL	Callum Roberson
2	DF	NZL	Joe Renwick
3	DF	NZL	Ben Thompson
4	MF	NZL	Morgan Day
5	DF	NZL	Javier Langley
6	DF	NZL	Jack Walecki (C)
7	MF	NZL	Harvey Stephens
8	MF	NZL	Jaxon Maze
9	FW	NZL	George Duncan
10	FW	NZL	Reece Burtenshaw
11	FW	NZL	Harrison Brokenshire
12	FW	NZL	Kowin Hancock
13	MF	NZL	Sam Power
14	MF	NZL	Tom Laing
15	FW	NZL	Patrick Koppert
16	DF	NZL	Joseph Hay
18	MF	NZL	Tyler Snow
19	MF	NZL	Luke Clissold

== Season by season record ==
2022 (National League)
2023- (Southern Premiership)

Season	Southern League/Southern Premiership									National League									Chatham Cup	Top scorer	
Season	P	W	D	L	F	A	GD	Pts	Pos	P	W	D	L	F	A	GD	Pts	Pos	Chatham Cup	Name	Goals
2022	18	2	3	13	21	72	-51	9	10th	Did not qualify									R3	(New Zealand) Cody Brook	6
2023	18	14	3	1	43	18	+25	45	1st	Not eligible to qualify									R2	(New Zealand) Rhys Quarrell	13
2024	18	15	1	2	76	18	+58	46	1st	Not eligible to qualify									R2	(New Zealand) Rhys Quarrell	27
2025	16	10	1	5	41	26	+15	31	3rd	Not eligible to qualify									R2	(New Zealand) Harvey Stephens	13
2026	16	9	3	4	34	21	+13	30	2nd	Not eligible to qualify									R3	(New Zealand) Harvey Stephens	11
