= List of New Zealand architects =

Following is a list of notable architects from New Zealand.

== Individuals ==
=== A ===
- Richard Abbott (1883–1954)
- Bill Alington (1929–2024)
- Edmund Anscombe (1874–1948)
- William Armson (1832/3–1883)
- Ian Athfield (1940–2015)

=== B ===
- Noel Bamford (1881–1952)
- Edward Bartley (1839–1919)
- Kate Beath (1882–1979)
- Peter Beaven (1925–2012)
- Andrea Bell
- Roy Keith Binney (1886–1957)
- Louis Boldini (1832–1908)
- Pete Bossley (born 1950)
- Felicity Brenchley
- Vernon Brown (1905–1965)
- John Burnside (1857–1920)
- Maxwell Bury (1825–1912)

=== C ===
- John Campbell (1857–1942)
- James Chapman-Taylor (1878–1958)
- Lillian Chrystall (1926–2022)
- Frederick de Jersey Clere (1856–1952)
- Amyas Connell (1901–1980)

=== D ===
- Tibor Donner (1907–1993)

=== F ===
- Samuel Farr (1827–1918)
- Carinnya Feaunati

=== G ===
- Julia Gatley
- Jackie Gillies
- George Selwyn Goldsbro' (1870–?)
- Lucy Greenish (1888–1976), first female Registered Architect
- William Henry Gummer (1884–1966)

=== H ===
- Min Hall
- Dorita Hannah
- Louis Hay (1881–1948)
- Philip Herapath (1823–1892)
- Nicola Herbst
- William Alfred Holman (1864–1949)
- Len Hoogerbrug (1929–2019)
- Basil Bramston Hooper (1876–1960)

=== I ===
- Charmaine 'Ilaiū Talei

=== J ===
- Annette Jones (architect)

=== K ===
- Judi Keith-Brown
- Henry Kulka (1900–1971)

=== L ===
- Robert Lawson (1833–1902)
- Isaac Luck (1817–1881)
- Gary Lawson (architect)
- Muriel Lamb (1911–2010)

=== M ===
- Joseph Maddison (1850–1923)
- Edward Mahoney (1824–1895)
- Harry Mandeno (1879–1972)
- Jack Manning (1929–2021)
- William Mason (1810–1897)
- Ted McCoy (1925–2018)
- David Mitchell (1941–2018)
- Chris Moller
- Benjamin Mountfort (1825–1898)
- Margaret Munro (1914–2005)

=== N ===
- Lindley Naismith
- Nancy Northcroft (1913–1980)

=== O ===
- Sally Ogle
- Yvette Overdyck

=== P ===
- June Pallot (1953–2004)
- Paul Pascoe (1908–1976)
- Andrew Patterson (born 1960)
- Francis Petre (1847–1918)

=== R ===
- David Ross
- Megan Rule

=== S ===
- Anne Salmond (architect)
- James Louis Salmond (1868–1950)
- John Scott (1924–1992)
- Lynda Simmons
- Alison Sleigh (1898–1972)
- John Sydney Swan (1874–1936)

=== T ===
- Frederick Thatcher (1814–1890)
- Richard Toy (1911–1995)
- George Troup (1863–1941)
- Raukura Turei artist and architectural designer.

=== V ===
- Christina van Bohemen

=== W ===
- Nathaniel Wales (1832–1903)
- Felicity Wallace
- Roger Walker (born 1942)
- Kathy Waghorn
- Miles Warren (1929–2022)
- Dorothy Wills (1911–2007)
- Gordon Wilson (1900–1959)
- Louise Wright

=== Y ===
- W. Gray Young (1885–1962)

== Firms ==
- Armson, Collins and Harman
- Gummer and Ford
- Hoggard, Prouse and Gummer
- E. Mahoney and Son
- Jasmax
- Mason & Wales
- Warren and Mahoney

== See also ==
- New Zealand Women Architects
- Architecture of New Zealand
- List of architects
- List of New Zealanders
