= Pip Cheshire =

New Zealand architect (1950–2026)

Pip Cheshire CNZM
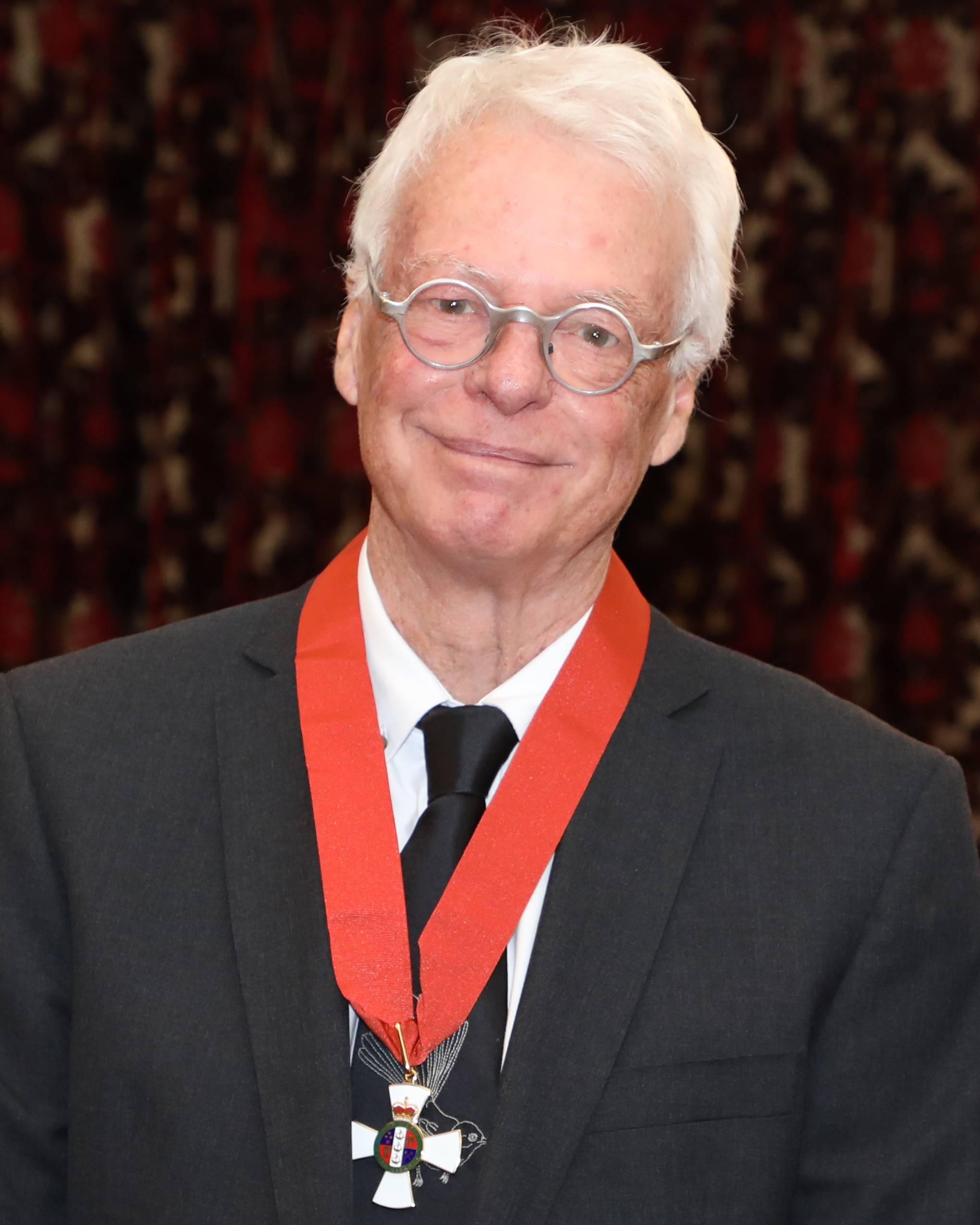
- Cheshire in 2024

President of the New Zealand Institute of Architects
- In office 2014–2016
- Preceded by: David Sheppard
- Succeeded by: Christina van Bohemen

Personal details
- Born: Philip Maxwell Cheshire; 28 July 1950 Christchurch, New Zealand
- Died: 11 February 2026 (aged 75) Auckland, New Zealand
- Children: 3
- Occupation: Architect
- Practice: Artifice; Bossley Cheshire; Jasmax; Cheshire Architects
- Buildings: Q Theatre, Auckland; Redevelopment of Leigh Marine Laboratory

Philip Maxwell Cheshire CNZM (28 July 1950 – 11 February 2026) was a New Zealand architect. One of the founding directors of Jasmax, and founder of Cheshire Architects, he was awarded the New Zealand Institute of Architects Gold Medal in 2013. Between 2014 and 2016, Cheshire served as president of the New Zealand Institute of Architects.

== Early life and education ==
Cheshire was born in Christchurch on 28 July 1950, the son of Gwynneth and Max Cheshire. Born with the lower half of his right leg missing, Cheshire grew up in the seaside suburb of Sumner and became a keen surfer. He was educated at Sumner School and Christ's College, and went on to study political science at the University of Canterbury, graduating with a Bachelor of Arts degree in 1974. While at Canterbury, he wrote for the student newspaper, Canta.

As a 16-year-old, Cheshire expressed a desire to become either an engineer or architect. In 1976, he began studying architecture at the University of Auckland, where his classmates included Mark Wigley, Jane Aimer, John Leijh, Lindley Naismith, Diane Brand, and Gill Matthewson.

== Architectural career ==
While still an architecture student, Cheshire designed Auckland restaurant, The Melba, which led to his obtaining a number of commissions for residential dwellings after he graduated. He first set up architectural collective, Artifice, with fellow young graduates, and later joined with Pete Bossley to form Bossley Cheshire Architects in 1984. In 1989, Bossley Cheshire merged with JASMaD and Gibbs Harris to form Jasmax, of which Cheshire was a director from 1989 to 2003, the final three years managing director. From 2003, he was in practice as Cheshire Architects, alongside his son Nat.

Cheshire served as president of the Auckland Architecture Association in 2007 and chair of the Auckland branch of the New Zealand Institute of Architects (NZIA) between 1998 and 2000. In 2003, Cheshire was appointed adjunct professor of architecture at the University of Auckland. From 2014 to 2016, he was the national president of the NZIA. During his tenure, he worked with Ngā Aho, the society of Māori design professionals, including Haare Williams, Rau Hoskins and Elisapeta Heta, to formulate Te Kawenata o Rata, a covenant to formalise and invigorate the relationship between the NZIA and Ngā Aho. Cheshire also served as a member of the Auckland urban design panel.

In 2008, Cheshire collaborated with photographer Patrick Reynolds to produce a book on the New Zealand bach, Architecture uncooked: the New Zealand holiday house through an architect's eye.

== Death ==
Cheshire died in Auckland on 11 February 2026, at the age of 75.

== Notable works ==
- Congreve House, North Shore
- Q Theatre, Auckland
- Leigh Marine Laboratory redevelopment
- Britomart precinct, Auckland
- Conservation of Discovery Hut and Scott's Hut, Antarctica

== Honours and awards ==
The Congreve House, designed by Cheshire while at Bossley Cheshire and documented when he was at Jasmax, won an NZIA national award in 1994. In 2003, Cheshire received a distinguished alumnus award from the University of Auckland.

Cheshire was made a Fellow of the New Zealand Institute of Architects in 2007. In 2013, he was awarded the New Zealand Institute of Architects Gold Medal, for outstanding contributions to the practice of architecture.

In the 2024 New Year Honours, Cheshire was appointed a Companion of the New Zealand Order of Merit (CNZM), for services to architecture.

== Publications ==
- Cheshire, Pip (2008). Architecture Uncooked: The New Zealand Holiday House Through an Architect's Eye. Photography: Patrick Reynolds. Auckland, NZ: Godwit. ISBN 1869621549. OCLC 435714832.
