= 1979 Chatham Cup =

Tournament details
- Venue(s): McLennan Park, Papakura
- Dates: 2 September 1979

Final positions
- Champions: North Shore United (5th title)
- Runners-up: Mount Wellington

The 1979 Chatham Cup was the 52nd annual nationwide knockout football competition in New Zealand.

Early stages of the competition were run in three regions (northern, central, and southern), with the National League teams receiving a bye until the Fourth Roundof the competition. In all, 131 teams took part in the competition. Note: Different sources give different numberings for the rounds of the competition: some start round one with the beginning of the regional qualifications; others start numbering from the first national knock-out stage. The former numbering scheme is used in this article.

== The 1979 final ==
The final was the second all-Auckland final clash, the first having been between the same teams (but with a different winner) in 1973. North Shore's Adrian Elrick and Keith Hobbs appeared in both finals (the latter as a substitute in the first match), as did Mount Wellington's Tony Sibley and Bill de Graaf. North Shore won the final for a then-record equalling fifth time. The final was the first of five in a row to feature Mount Wellington.

The final has been described as "the one that slipped away", as the expected venue, Newmarket Park, was made unavailable after a small landslide destroyed much of the playing area. McLennan Park in Papakura stepped in as a replacement. Mount Wellington would have gone into the match as clear favourites, but the sending off of play-maker Brian Turner in the previous match rendered him suspended from the final, l evening the two sides up considerably.

In the first half goals were traded, with the Mount's John Leijh opening the scoring only for Keith Hobbs to level the score for North Shore. Early in the second spell Mount Wellington's Stewart Carruthers was sent off, tipping the scales towards the North Shore side. The Mount were entrenched deep in their own half for much of the remainder of the match but Ian Ormond was brought down in the box and slotted the ball home from the resulting penalty to take the cup over the Waitematā.

== Results ==
=== Third Round ===
Caversham	12 – 1	Northern Hearts (Timaru)

East Coast Bays	3 – 1	Whangarei City

Glen Carron (Manawatu)	4 – 3	Wanganui East Athletic

Halswell United	w/o†	Christchurch Technical

Hamilton	3 – 0	Waikato University

Masterton	4 – 1	Karori Swifts

Mosgiel	2 – 1	Roslyn-Wakari

Mount Albert-Ponsonby	0 – 5	Mount Roskill

Napier City Rovers	1 – 1*	Gisborne City

New Plymouth Old Boys	0 – 6	Taranaki United (New Plymouth)

Ngongotaha	0 – 3	Rotorua City

Old Boys (Invercargill)	1 – 5	Invercargill Thistle

Papatoetoe	2 – 0	Cornwall (Auckland)

Porirua United	w/o†	Wellington City

Seatoun	1 – 2	Miramar Rangers

Stokes Valley	2 – 0	Naenae

Victoria University	4 – 3	North Wellington

Waitemata City	0 – 0*	Eden

Western (Christchurch)	0 – 1	Christchurch Rangers

Woolston WMC	3 – 1	Papanui Suburbs

* Won on penalties by Napier City Rovers (5–3) and Eden (5–4). † Halswell United and Wellington City disqualified

=== Fourth Round ===
Blockhouse Bay	2 – 1	Hamilton

Christchurch Rangers	0 – 3	Dunedin City

Christchurch United	11 – 2	Christchurch Technical

East Coast Bays	1 – 0	Papatoetoe

Invercargill Thistle	0 – 1	Mosgiel

Manurewa	2 – 1	Courier Rangers (Auckland)

Mount Roskill	3 – 1	Rotorua City

Mount Wellington	3 – 1	Eastern Suburbs (Auckland)

Napier City Rovers	7 – 1	Masterton

North Shore United	4 – 0	Eden

Porirua United	0 – 5	Manawatu United (Palmerston N.)

Stokes Valley	1 – 0	Miramar Rangers

Stop Out (Lower Hutt)	2 – 0	Victoria University

Taranaki United	0 – 1	Glen Carron

Wellington Diamond United	1 – 0	Nelson United

Woolston WMC	2 – 0	Caversham

=== Fifth Round ===
Blockhouse Bay	0 – 3	Manurewa

Christchurch United	2 – 0	Dunedin City

East Coast Bays	1 – 2 (aet)	Mount Wellington

Napier City Rovers	1 – 0	Glen Carron

North Shore United	4 – 1	Mount Roskill

Stokes Valley	0 – 4	Stop Out

Wellington Diamond United	4 – 3	Manawatu United

Woolston W.M.C.	3 – 0	Mosgiel

=== Quarter-finals ===
Christchurch United	1 – 1 (aet)*	Woolston W.M.C.

Mount Wellington	5 – 0	Manurewa

North Shore United	6 – 3 (aet)	Napier City Rovers

Stop Out	2 – 3	Wellington Diamond United

* Woolston won 4–2 on penalties

=== Semi-finals ===
Mount Wellington	3 – 1	Woolston W.M.C.

Wellington Diamond United	2 – 5	North Shore United

=== Final ===
2 September 1979

North Shore United	2 – 1	Mount Wellington
Hobbs, I. Ormond		Leijh

McLennan Park, Papakura
Referee: W.K. Munro
