= Len Hoogerbrug =

New Zealand architect (1929–2019)

- Born: Leendert Jacob Johannus Hoogerbrug; 25 June 1929; Hilversum, Netherlands
- Died: 16 April 2019 (aged 89); Hastings, New Zealand
- Education: Auckland University College
- Occupation: Architect
- Spouse: Diana Joan Sutherland (died 2009)
- Practice: Hoogerbrug, Magdalinos and Williams

Leendert Jacob Johannus Hoogerbrug (25 June 1929 – 16 April 2019), generally known as Len Hoogerbrug, was a New Zealand architect whose practice was based in Hawke's Bay.

== Architectural career ==
Born in Hilversum, Netherlands, on 25 June 1929, Hoogerbrug studied architectural engineering in Utrecht before migrating to New Zealand in 1951. Initially he worked as a draftsman for Mandeno, Frazer and Galbraith in Dunedin, and then for J.D. Allingham. He began taking architecture papers from Auckland University College extramurally, before moving to Auckland to complete his studies full-time, as well as working for Charles Irwin Crookes Architects. Hoogerbrug graduated in 1956 and moved to Hawke's Bay, working briefly for Malcolm and Sweet Architects, before gaining registration in 1957 and establishing his own practice in Hastings.

In 1958, Hoogerbrug was responsible for executing the Firth Concrete offices in Karamu Street North, Hastings, designed by Maurice K. Smith, but with some modifications by Hoogerbrug. The spatial atmosphere, geometry and glazed gable ends of the Firth building anticipate Hoogerbrug's design for St James's Anglican Church in Duke Street, Hastings (1963), as well as John Scott's celebrated 1961 Futuna Chapel.

In the early 1960s, Hoogerbrug made an extended overseas tour through Australia, Asia, and Europe, and in 1963 he completed St James's Church in Hastings, which received a New Zealand Institute of Architects (NZIA) merit award in 1964. About the same time, Hoogerbrug entered into partnership with John Scott, which continued until 1972. During this period, Hoogerbrug designed the Ahuriri Tavern (1965) on West Quay, Ahuriri, which gained a NZIA merit award in 1969.

In 1975, Hoogerbrug joined Paris Magdalinos in partnership, and they were later joined by engineer Bruce Williams to form Hoogerbrug, Magdalinos and Williams. Hoogerbrug's St Andrew's Presbyterian Church (1979) in Market Street, Hastings, and Seventh Day Adventist Church (1986) in Ada Street, Hastings, were both awarded NZIA branch awards, in 1980 and 1989, respectively.

=== Works ===
Works by Hoogerbrug include:

- Van Bohemen house, Havelock North (1957)
- Firth Concrete offices, Hastings (1958)
- Te Mata shops, Havelock North (1959)
- St James' Church, Hastings (1963)
- Ahuriri Tavern, Napier (1965)
- Peterfield Properties offices, Waipukurau (1966)
- Crippled Children's Society headquarters, Napier (1967)
- Havelock Ski Club, Whakapapa skifield (1967)
- Leopard Inn, Napier (1970)
- Tamatea Tavern, Napier (1977)
- St Andrew's Church, Hastings (1979)
- Havelock North public library, Havelock North (1980)
- Hawke's Bay Power Board building, Hastings (1983)
- Seventh Day Adventist Church, Parkvale, Hastings (1986)
- Napier Boys' High School dormitory, Napier (1990)
- Flaxmere Policing Centre, Flaxmere (1991)
- Kerry Stone General Motors, Hastings (1991)

== Death ==
Hoogerbrug died in Hastings on 16 April 2019.
