= Van Bohemen =

van Bohemen is a surname. Notable people with the surname include:

- Chahine van Bohemen (born 2004), Dutch-Moroccan footballer
- Christina van Bohemen, New Zealand architect
- Gerard van Bohemen, New Zealand judge

== See also ==
- Fra Kristiania-Bohêmen, novel
