= St Canice's Church, Westport =

St Canice's Church
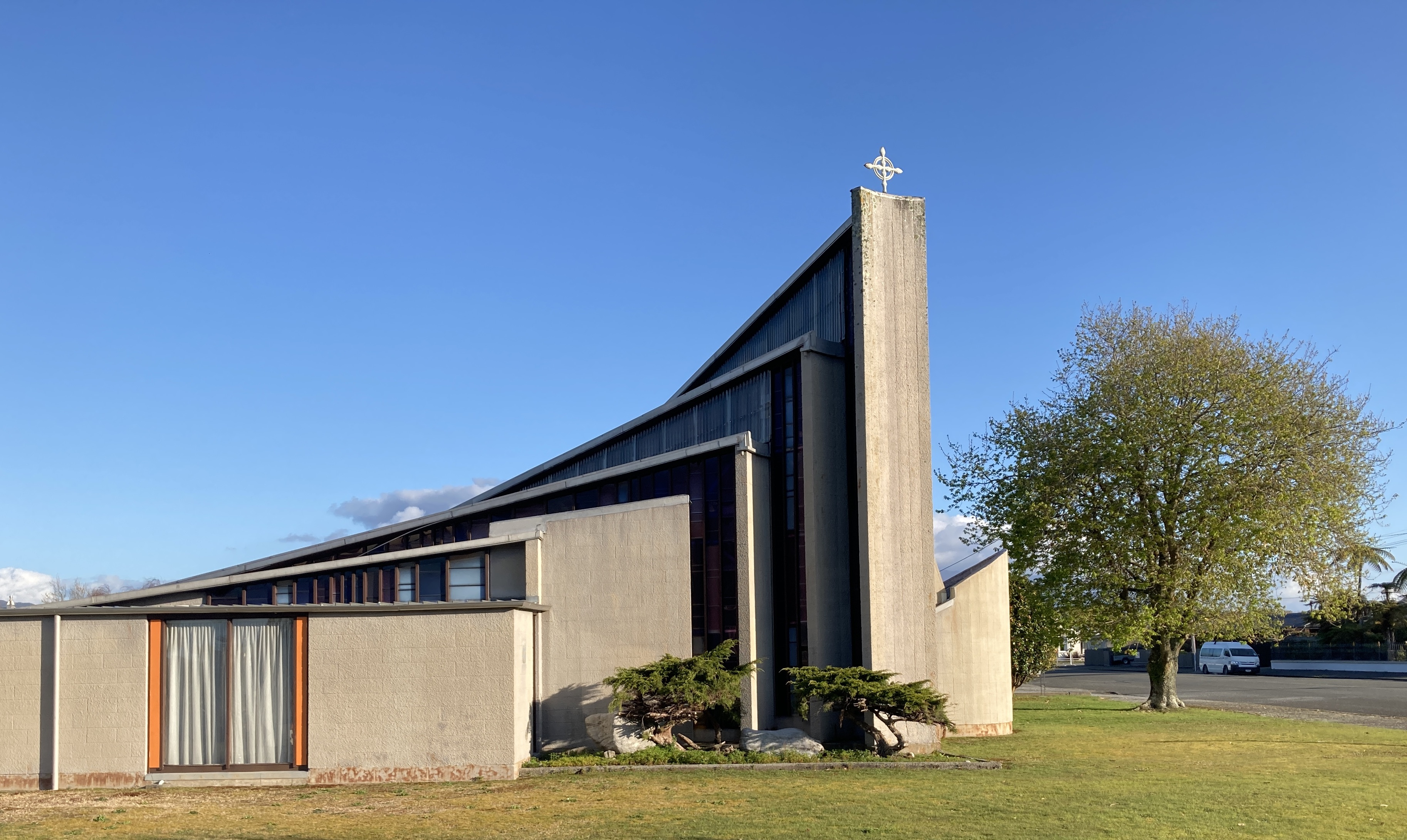
- St Canice's Church, Westport, in 2020
- St Canice's Church
- 41°45′19.33″S 171°36′7.13″E
- Location: 18 Brougham Street, Westport
- Country: New Zealand
- Denomination: Catholic
- Website: St Canice Parish Westport

History
- Status: Parish church
- Consecrated: 8 August 1976

Architecture
- Functional status: Active
- Architect: John Scott
- Architectural type: Modernist
- Completed: 1976
- Construction cost: $100,000

Specifications
- Capacity: 300
- Materials: Reinforced concrete, masonry block, timber, coloured acrylic

Administration
- Archdiocese: Wellington
- Parish: St Canice, Westport

St Canice's Church in Westport, New Zealand, is a Catholic parish church, designed by John Scott. Consecrated in 1976, it is the second church on the site, replacing the earlier St Canice's designed by Francis Petre and completed in 1888.

== Context ==
The Westport parish of St Canice was established in 1867, and is the largest parish in the Roman Catholic Archdiocese of Wellington. The first churches in the parish, however, were not in Westport, with churches built at Brighton (now called Tiromoana), Charleston, and Addisons Flat, to service gold-mining communities. However, under the supervision of parish priest Father Thomas Walshe, the first Catholic church in Westport was opened on 17 March 1868. The church, initially called Star of the Sea, but quickly renamed St Canice's after the patron saint of Walshe's birth city of Kilkenny in Ireland, was located at the corner of Bright and Queen Streets, some 850 metres (930 yd) north of the present St Canice's.

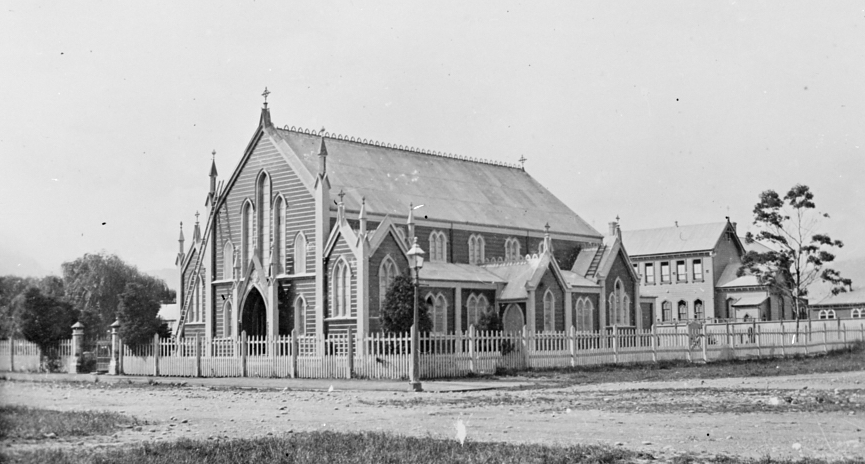
The second St Canice's Church in Westport, designed by Francis Petre and opened in 1888

Father Walshe began fundraising for a new church in Westport in late 1878, after returning from a sabbatical in Ireland, but it was not until 1886 that the church building committee authorised the project to proceed. The new St Canice's was designed by architect Francis Petre, and was built at the corner of Brougham and Queen Streets, adjacent to St Canice's School. The church, neo-Gothic in style with overall dimensions of 26 m (85 ft) by 12 m (40 ft), and capacity for a congregation of 400, was built from timber (kauri, rimu, tōtara and manoao), and opened in November 1888. The official opening and blessing, however, was in June the following year, when Archbishop Francis Redwood visited Westport. The total cost of the church was £2600, including furniture and fittings.

The church was weakened by a magnitude 5.9 earthquake centred at Westport on 10 May 1962, and by the Inangahua earthquake in 1968. The cost of repairs and seismic strengthening were deemed prohibitive, and in May 1971 it was decided to replace the church with a new building to be designed by John Scott, who has been described as "the greatest church designer of this country's modern era". Scott's appointment was controversial at the time, as Charles Thomas, a Christchurch architect, had already done preliminary work for the new church. The parish priest at the time, Father David Monaghan, who encouraged the parish committee to engage Scott, had come to Westport from Havelock North in 1970, and was intimately familiar with Scott's Our Lady of Lourdes Church (1960), where he had been parish priest from 1968.

In June 1974, the old church was finally condemned following strong gales during Mass, when some of the congregation feared that the building would collapse. The building was never used for worship again.

== Architecture ==
Officially opened by Cardinal Reginald Delargey on 8 August 1976, St Canice's Church was John Scott's final new church commission. Its modern design was challenging at first to some parishioners, who preferred the more traditional style of the building that it replaced. Like all of Scott's churches, the design of St Canice's is predicated on a strong geometric concept—in this case a fan—and embodied much experimentation, and interplay of coloured light with a complex geometry. A series of four stepped triangular sections are arranged radially, rising up above the altar, and clerestory windows use Scott's typical coloured acrylic glazing, in red, green, yellow and blue. Elsewhere, stained-glass windows from the earlier church have been incorporated. Other materials favoured by Scott are also used: cast concrete, concrete block, and stained timber. Mataī tongue and groove lines the ceiling. Built by local contractors H. J. Neilson Ltd, the construction cost was about $100,000.

As well as some of the stained glass, a number of other elements of the previous church were also reused, including the bell, sanctuary lamp, baptismal font, the stations of the cross, several statues, and the cross on the new church roof. New timber pews replaced the old ones, which were infested with borer. A tapestry, Spiral with Cross, was woven for the church in 1983 by Westport artist Marilyn Rea-Menzies.

University of Auckland architectural academic and commentator Bill McKay has described St Canice's Church, along with Scott's St Mary's Church, Greenmeadows (1975), as "a high point in the diverse and prolific church construction of postwar New Zealand", but notes that "they have an unresolved quality—perhaps because of their complex geometrical ambition—that gives them a somewhat loose and restless air that is expressive of social changes in the late 1960s and early '70s". Architectural historian Julia Gatley has written that the church is "arguably the architectural highlight of the West Coast". In the 2005 New Zealand Institute of Architects Nelson–Marlborough branch awards, St Canice's received an enduring architecture award, with the judges saying that it was a "spatially intricate building, combining uplifing spaces and light with an engaging scale and practical planning".

== Current status ==
Structural assessments of St Canice's in September and November 2012, following the Christchurch earthquakes, rated the building's structural strength as being 18 per cent of the current new building standard, and suggested that the likely mode of failure would be a slow collapse above the pulpit area. As of 2020, the building continues to be used for services.

== Gallery ==
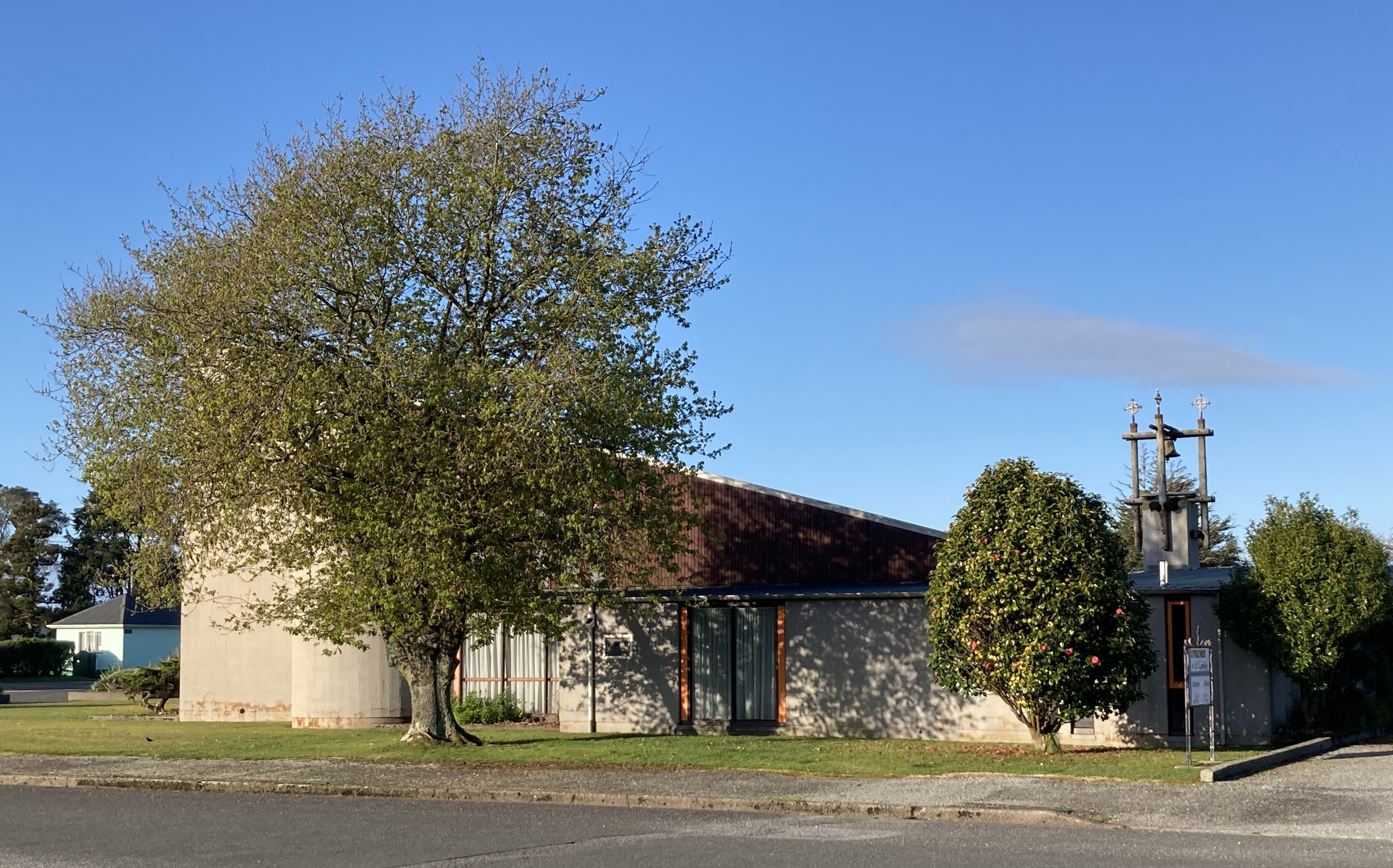

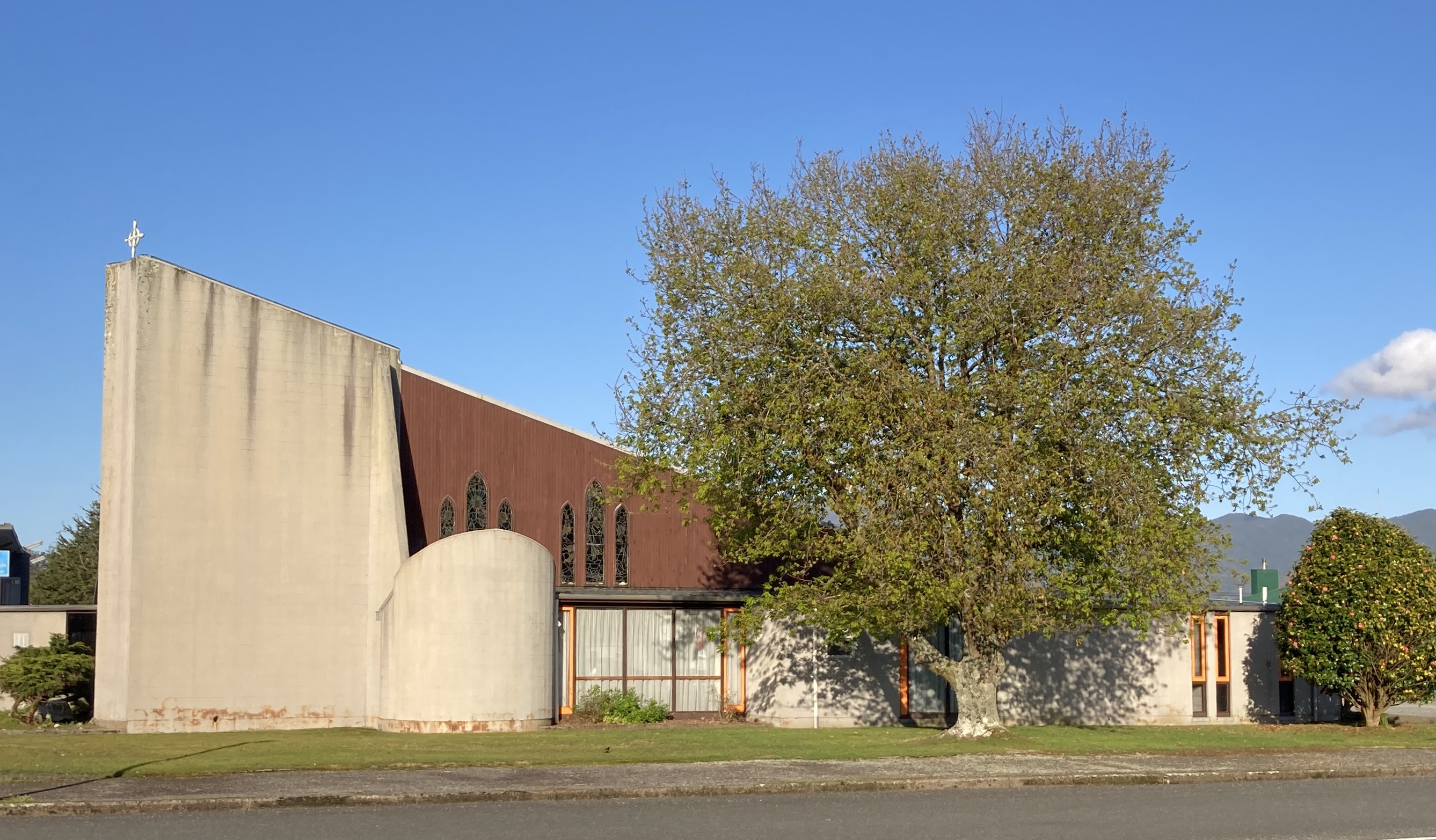

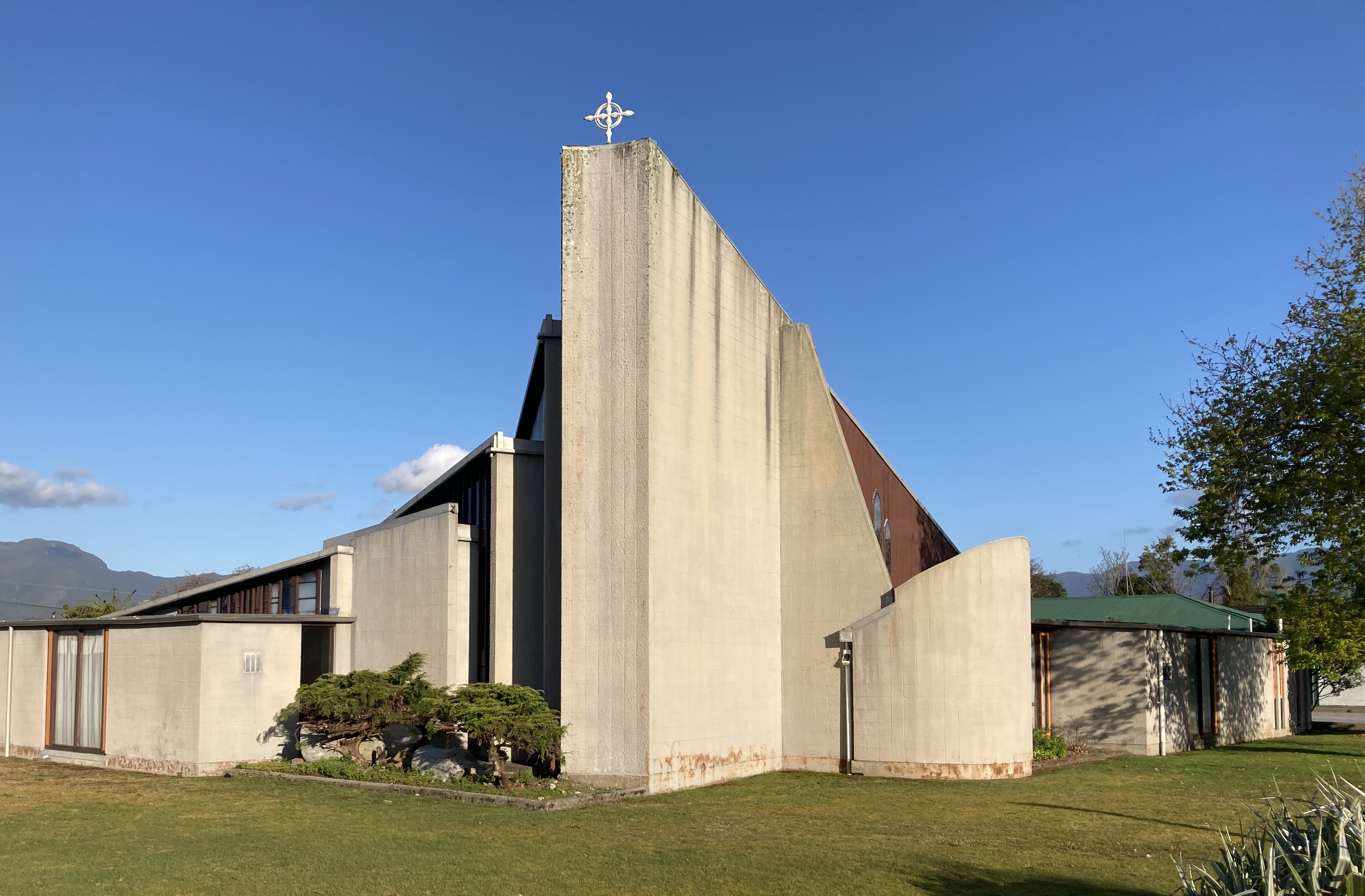

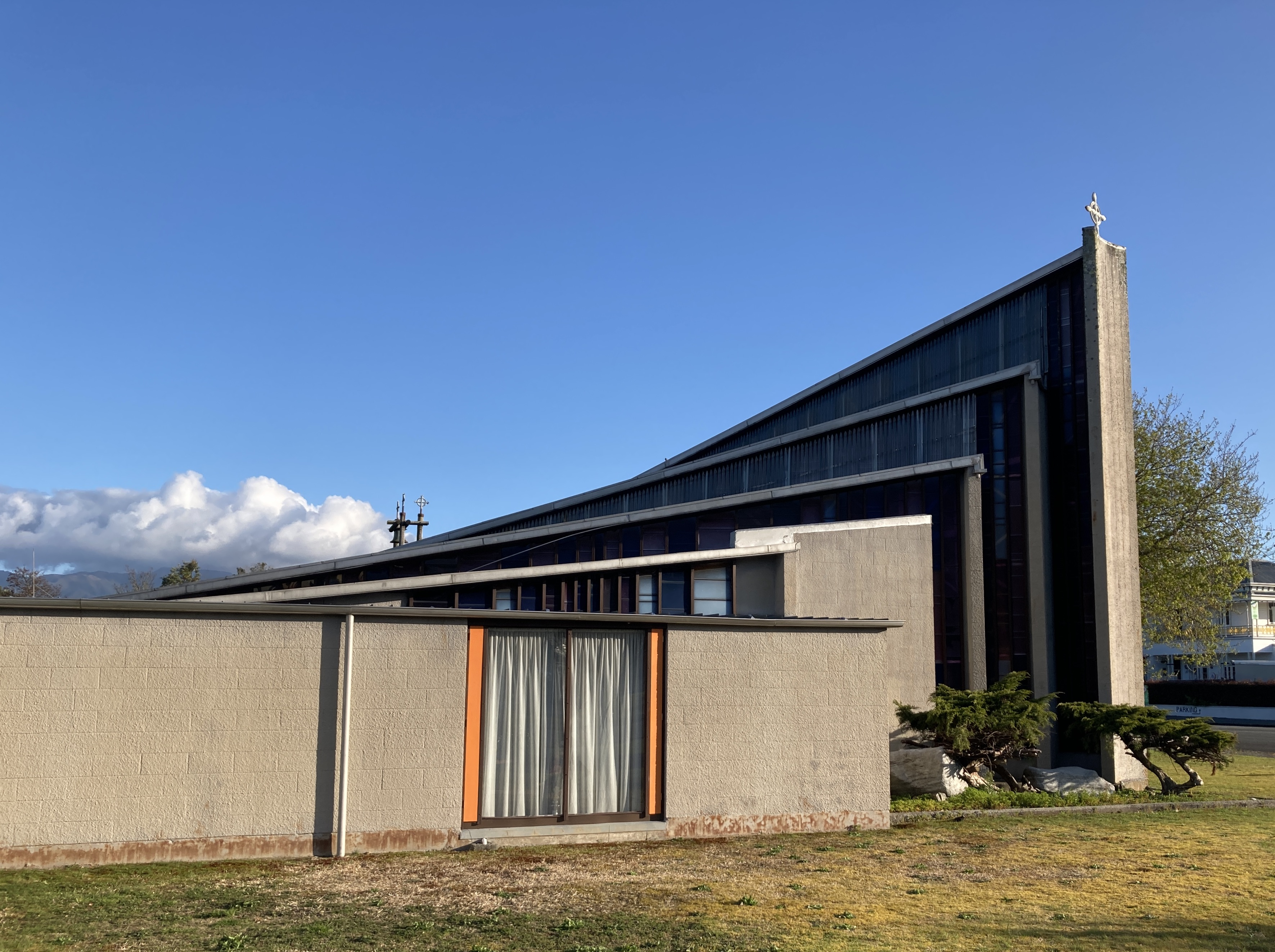

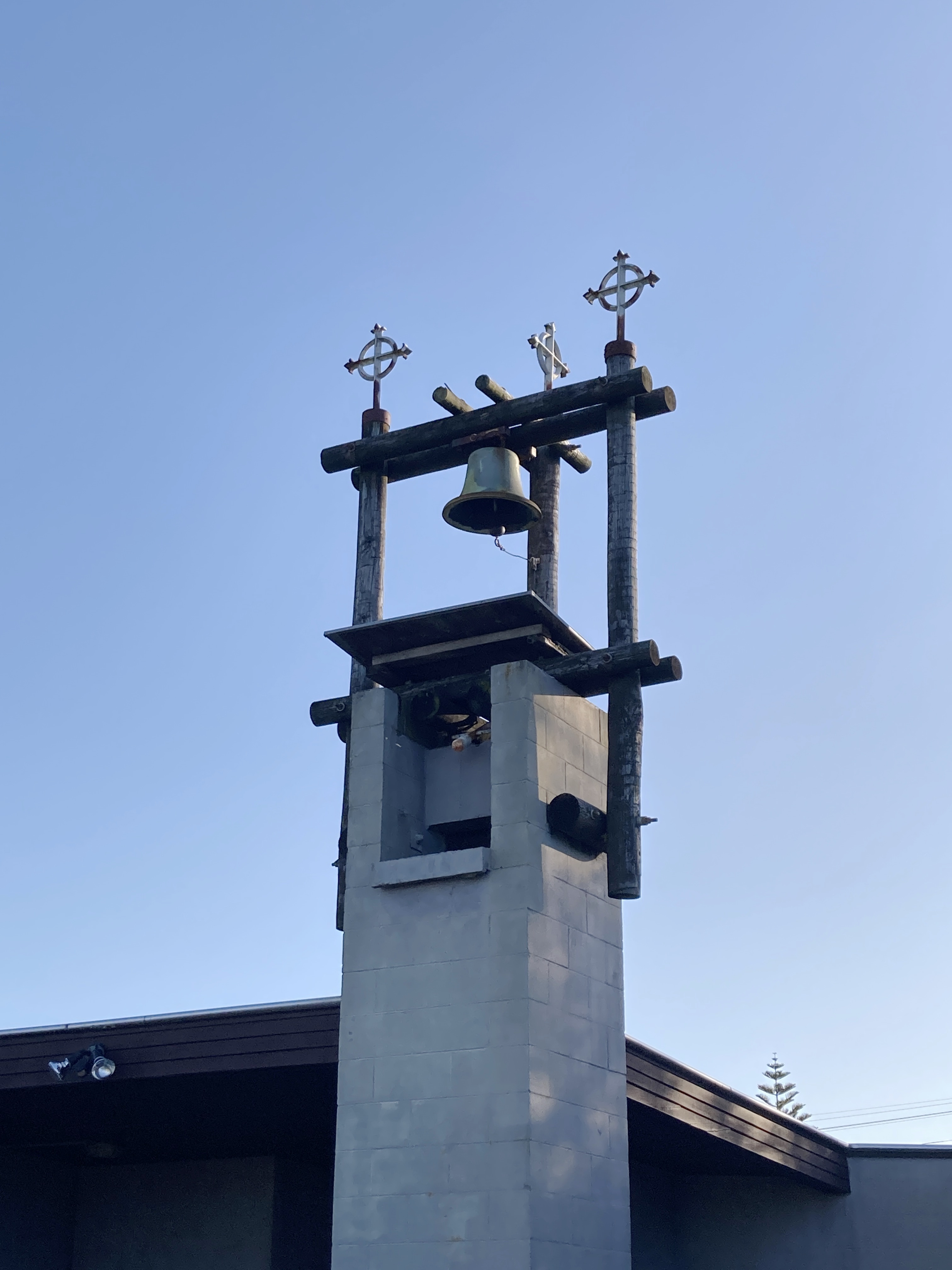

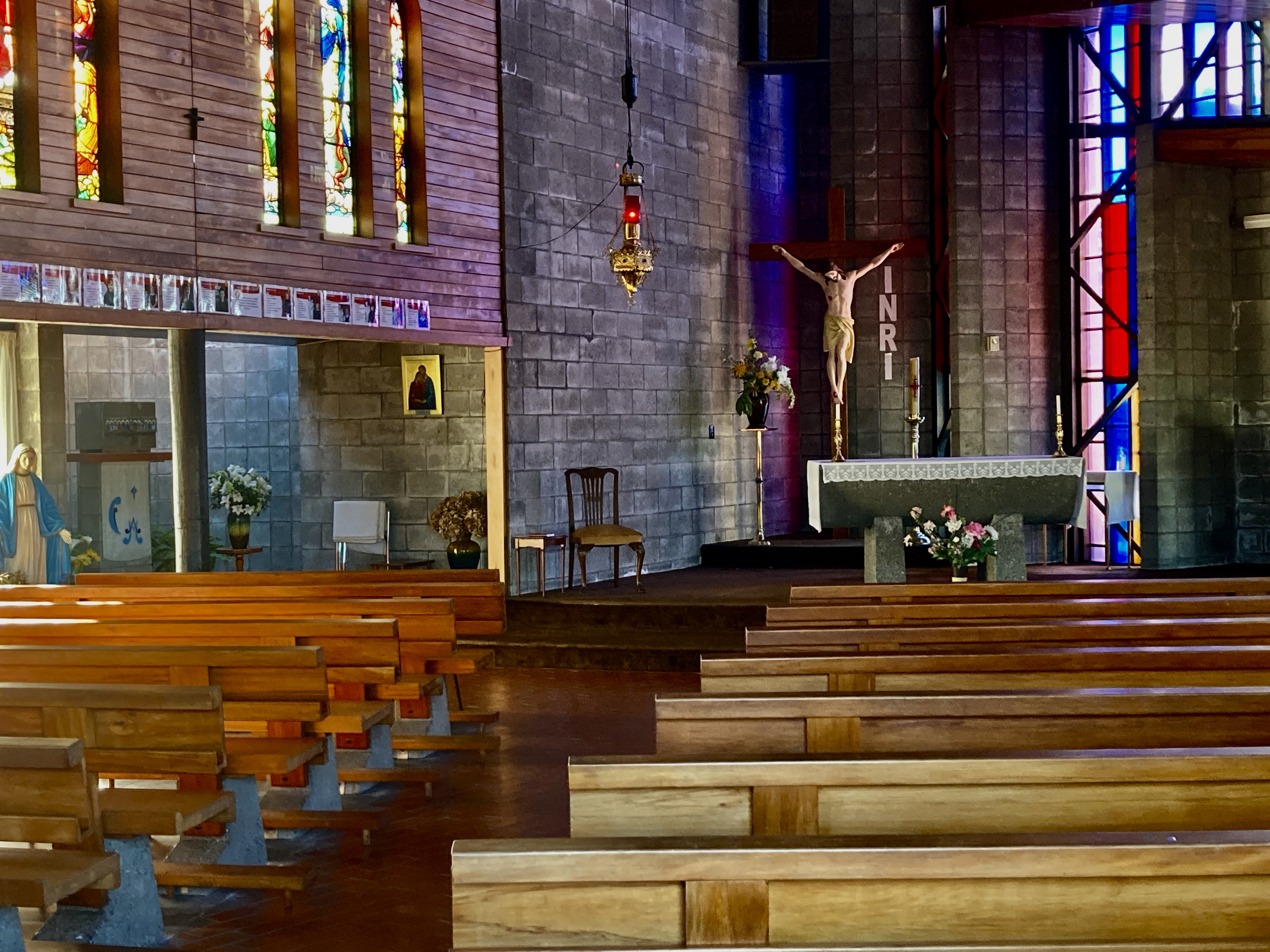

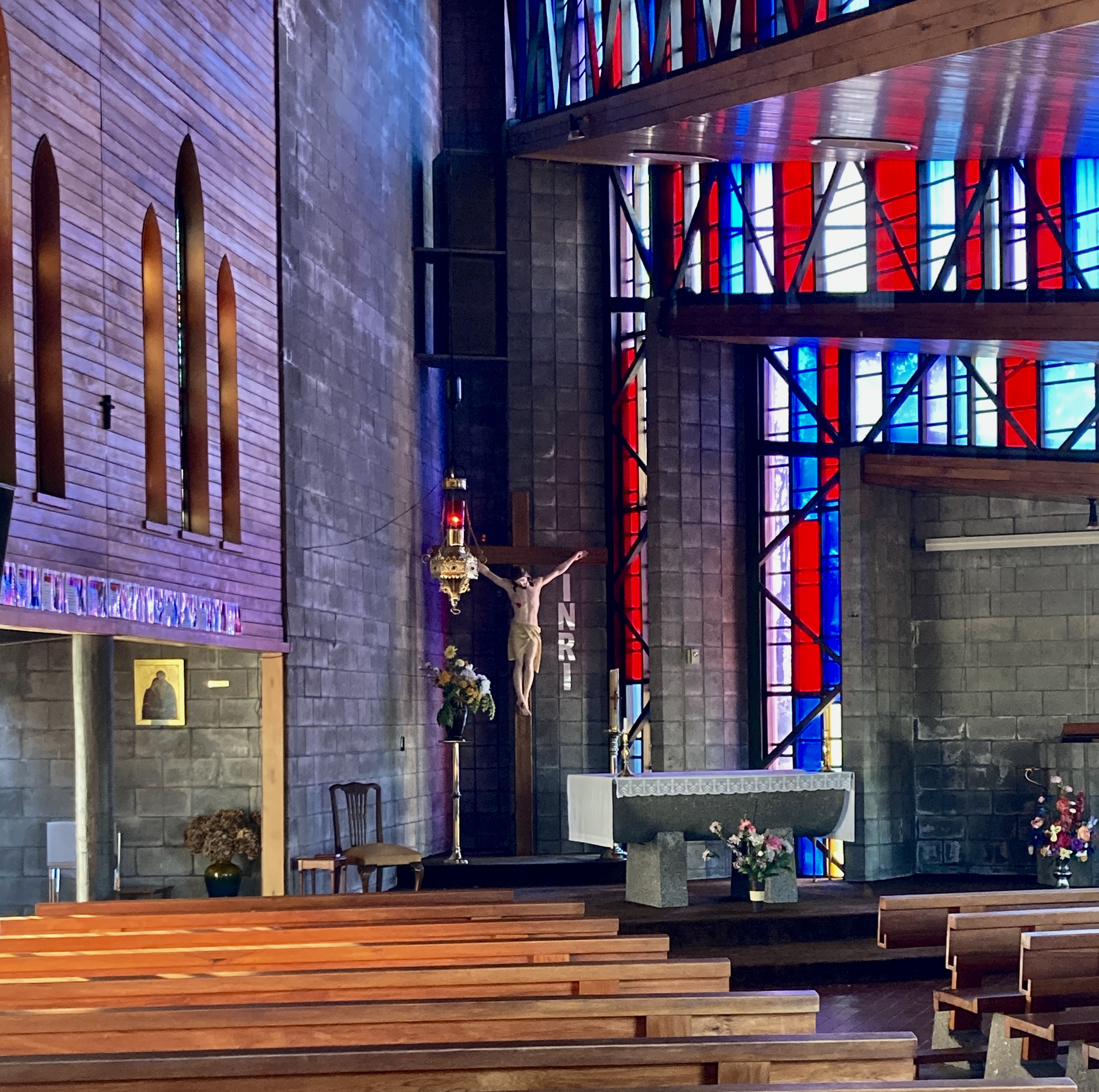
