= Pete Bossley =

New Zealand architect

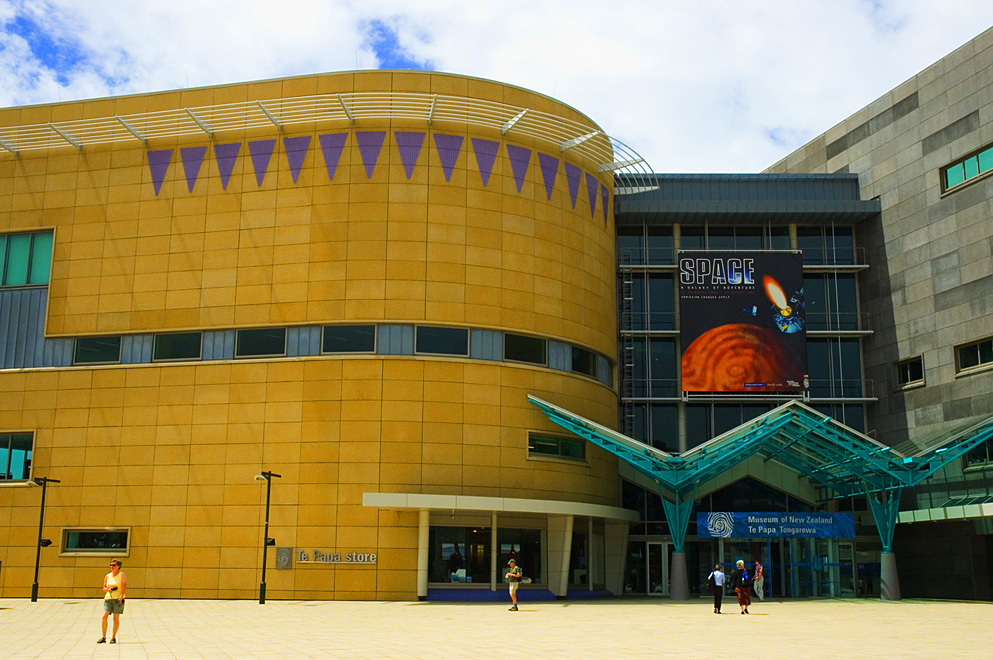
The Museum of New Zealand Te Papa Tongarewa

Peter James Bossley (born 1950) is a New Zealand architect based in Auckland, most recognised for his role leading the design team for the Museum of New Zealand Te Papa Tongarewa. Bossley was an adjunct professor at the Unitec Institute of Technology School of Architecture. He has received numerous awards, including the New Zealand Institute of Architects (NZIA) Gold Medal in 2012 for outstanding contributions to the practice of architecture.

== Early life and education ==
Bossley was born in Nelson in 1950 and attended Nelson College in 1962, followed by his final years at Christchurch Boys' High School.

He initially trained as an architectural technician gaining a NZCD (Arch) in 1974, and then attended the University of Auckland, graduating with BArch (Hons) in 1977.

== Career ==
As a young architect, Bossley set up a practice with fellow graduates a year after completing his studies. The firm was first called Pete Bossley Architects, and then became Bossley Cheshire Architects, a joint practice with Pip Cheshire from 1984 to 1988. In 1989, Bossley Cheshire merged with JASMaD and Gibbs Harris to form Jasmax, of which Bossley was a director from 1989 to 1996. In 1997–1998, he undertook the role of adjunct professor at the newly established Unitec School of Architecture, and continued to lecture there for many years. In 1996, Pete Bossley Architects was re-established. In 2012 a new company, Bossley Architects, was formed.

== Architectural style and projects ==
While studying architecture, Bossley demonstrated an unorthodox personal style, and a strong empathy towards a building's natural environment. These aspects are apparent in some of Bossley's most well-known residential designs such as the Waterfall Bay House, the Brown Vujcich House, and the Okitu House, all of which were award-winning residential designs. Bossley's residential designs are characterised by innovative structural elements, bright colour accents, strong geometry, and dramatic individuality. Bossley recently designed the pavilion holiday accommodation in Hawke's Bay, New Zealand, a structure that has the distinction of being located adjacent to a house designed by acclaimed Māori architect John Scott.

== Notable works ==
- Island Complex, Bay of Islands (1997)
- Museum of New Zealand Te Papa Tongarewa, Wellington (1998)
- McCahon artists retreat, Titirangi, Auckland (2005)
- New Zealand Maritime Museum extension, Auckland (2011)

== Awards ==
Bossley and his practice have received over 60 New Zealand Institute of Architects awards, and the Home of the Year Award sponsored by Home Magazine four times– first for the Island Complex House, Moturua in 1998, second for the Beach Retreat, Bay of Islands in 2004. Finally for Clifftops House for City Home of the Year 2022 and Interiors Home of the Year 2022. In 2012 Bossley was awarded the New Zealand Institute of Architects Gold Medal in 2012 for outstanding contributions to the practice of architecture. He is also a Fellow of the New Zealand Institute of Architects.

== Publications ==
- One Year Drawn , Point Publishing, 2019
- Pete Bossley Architects, The New Zealand Architectural Publications Trust, 2005
- Te Papa, An Architectural Adventure, Te Papa Press, 1998
