= Judith Taylor =

New Zealand architect

Judith Taylor FNZIA
- Taylor in 2026
- Born: New Zealand
- Education: Victoria University of Wellington
- Occupation: Architect

Judith Taylor FNZIA is a New Zealand architect. She served as the president of the New Zealand Institute of Architects from 2022 to 2024.

== Career ==
Judith Taylor was raised in Wellington. Her mother was a nurse and her father worked in a senior role at the post office. She attended Wellington East Girls' College, where a career counsellor suggested architecture as a potential career path.

Judith Taylor studied at Victoria University of Wellington and shortly after graduating moved to work in London for a couple of years. Following her return to Wellington, Judith Taylor worked as a project architect at Craig Craig Moller in the 1980s. During that time she worked on various high-rise office and fitout projects. She achieved her initial architects' registration in 1986.

Judith Taylor created her own company Taylor Architects, where she worked from home while balancing raising her children. Taylor Architects worked for Parliamentary Services in Wellington. The projects started small, such as installing toilets for Jenny Shipley, and eventually led to larger projects such as the refurbishment of Bowen House.

From 2015 to 2024 Judith Taylor was an associate at Context Architects and was particularly involved in improving their project delivery. As of 2024, Judith Taylor is the acting chief executive at the New Zealand Registered Architects Board.

=== Involvement with the NZIA ===
Judith Taylor became a Fellow of New Zealand Institute of Architects in 1997 and also previously served as a chairperson of the Wellington branch of NZIA.

From 2022 to 2024, Judith Taylor served as the president of NZIA during which her focus included improving operations and fostering young graduates and architects. Judith Taylor was the fourth female president in NZIA's history.
