= Sally Ogle =

New Zealand architect

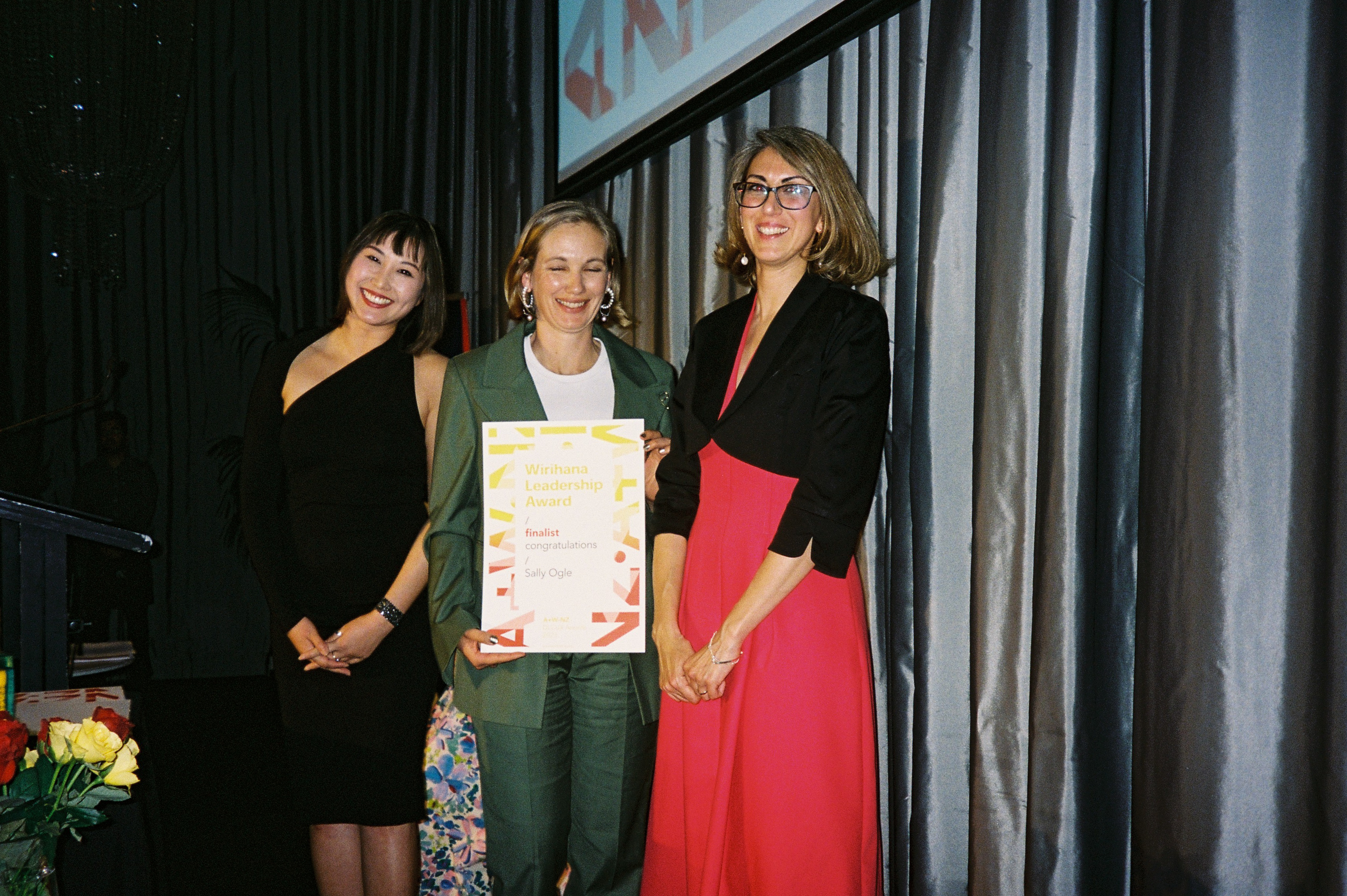
- Ogle (middle) in 2023 at the A+W NZ Dulux Awards
- Occupation: Architect
- Practice: Patchwork Architecture

Sally Ogle is a New Zealand architect. She is the co-founder and director of Patchwork Architecture, which has won multiple awards for their residential projects.

== Career ==
Ogle was raised in rural Taranaki where her interest in both the arts and science led her to architecture school. She studied at Victoria University of Wellington from 2001 to 2006, where she met future collaborators Ben Mitchell-Anyon and Tim Gittos. Ogle was part of the jury of the New Zealand Architecture Awards in 2023 and is an active member of the Wellington Branch of the NZIA.

In 2023, Ogle was shortlisted for the Wirihana Leadership Award in the A+W NZ Dulux Awards. Alongside her architectural projects, she was noted for promoting equitable work practices by maintaining a 50/50 gender split and flexible work arrangements. Ogle has spoken out about equitable work hours and work life balance in architecture.

"The number of hours you put in are not the measure of how committed and passionate you are about architecture; nor are they a guarantee of producing quality work"

=== Dogbox (2013) ===
Dogbox is a residential house, designed and built by Ogle with Mitchell-Anyon and Gittos. After graduating university, the three bought a plot of land in Whanganui with the intention of being able to direct and build their own project. The positioning of the house was determined by the flattest section of the otherwise steep site. The house design was informed by a series of second-hang trusses they could afford to purchase, that set the width and shape of the roof.

The ground floor is constructed using in situ concrete with a long jetty-like deck, and the upper story is constructed of timber, clad in polycarbonate panels.

Ogle, Mitchell-Anyon, Gittos, and Caro Robertson (Gittos' partner and fellow architect), constructed the building themselves, using carpentry books as guidance. Ogle cites the Dogbox as playing a significant part in improving her skills as an architect, providing new understanding of building sites and construction.

Ogle has written about her experiences designing and building Dogbox in multiple publications.

=== Patchwork Architecture ===
After the construction of Dogbox, Ogle and Mitchell-Anyon formed Patchwork Architecture working predominantly on residential projects. They have been recognised for their work on complex and restrictive building sites as well as their playful approach to design. They are also known for their use of low tech, durable materials and the affordability of their designs.

In 2016, the pair designed and built Stealth Bomber - a three bedroom house for Ogle and Mitchell-Anyon to live in with their respective partners. Professional builders were commissioned to construct part of the house, with the pair taking over to complete the construction of the interior details. Ogle's partner also assisted with the structural engineering design. Ogle still resides in "Stealth Bomber" with her partner and their daughter.

Their 2022 project Party Wall - a two-storey duplex with a prominent in situ concrete party wall - was awarded the Sir Ian Athfield Award for Housing.

== Notable projects and awards ==
- Dogbox, Whanganui (Note: in collaboration with Tim Gittos and Caro Robertson of Spacecraft Architects)- HOME magazine Home of the Year Finalist 2013
- Stealth Bomber, Wellington
- Pyramid Scheme - HOME magazine Home of the Year Finalist 2017
- Hot Box, Wellington - awarded 2020 Wellington Architecture Awards - Housing category
- 10x10 House, Wellington - awarded the 2020 New Zealand Architecture Awards - Housing category
- Kahutara House, Wellington - awarded 2022 New Zealand Architecture Awards - Housing category
- Party Wall, Wellington - awarded Sir Ian Athfield Housing Award 2022
- Gonville Pool House - awarded 2024 New Zealand Architecture Awards - Housing Alterations & Additions category
- Houghton Bay House - awarded 2024 Wellington Architecture Awards - Housing category
