= Anne Salmond (architect) =

New Zealand architect

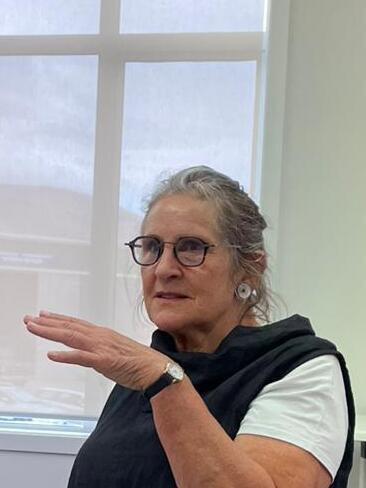
- Salmond in 2025
- Born: New Zealand
- Education: Victoria University of Wellington
- Occupation: Architect
- Awards: Distinguished Fellow of the New Zealand Institute of Architects
- Practice: Salmond Architecture

Anne Salmond is a New Zealand architect, based in Wānaka, New Zealand. Her work is noted for the emphasis placed on green architecture, sustainability and whole-of-life building design.

== Career ==
Salmond graduated from Victoria University in 1980, and then worked for Athfield Architects from 1985 to 1988, collaborating there with Clare Athfield. She was the founding member, with three other architects, of the Wellington practice Architecture+. While a director there, Salmond won the competition held to design the Pātaka Art + Museum in Porirua, which enabled her practice to move towards working on larger-scale buildings.

In the late 1980s, Salmond relocated to Wānaka and established the practice of Salmond Architecture there. Since its founding, Salmond's practice has focused on improving the quality of local housing, and advocating for reducing house size to improve their thermal performance. This interest is reflected with her developing structural insulated panels, for use in local housing.

=== High Performance Houses ===
Salmond developed a series of sustainable, modular home designs known as the High Performance Houses. The designs uitilise sustainable materials. pre-fabrication, and passive heating and cooling to achieve a high level of energy efficiency. The houses can also be adapted and extended with modular design and standardised construction methodology.

The first High Performance House was built in 2013 as a show-home for the Home Innovation Village (HIVE) in Christchurch. The design was celebrated for its high level of thermal performance, fast build time, and accessible design. The thermal performance was mostly achieved by eliminating the thermal bridging in the exterior framing system with very high levels of insulation and thermally broken windows with double glazing.

=== Recognition ===
In 2019, she was made a Distinguished Fellow of the New Zealand Institute of Architects, in recognition of her contribution to New Zealand architecture. As of 2023, she has been an assessor for the New Zealand Registered Architects Board for more than 15 years.

== Notable works ==
- Pātaka Art + Museum, practicing at Architecture+ (1980)
- HIVE High Performance House (2013)
- Merivale House & Holmwood House, Christchurch (2016) - two high performance houses built on subdivided land by the same client.
- Whare Mahana (Luggate Memorial Centre), Luggate (2023) - NZIA Southern Architecture Award Winner
- Woolshed, Cardona - residential house near the Cardona Ski Fields
- Dublin Bay House, Otago - Salmond's own home
