= Felicity Brenchley =

New Zealand architect

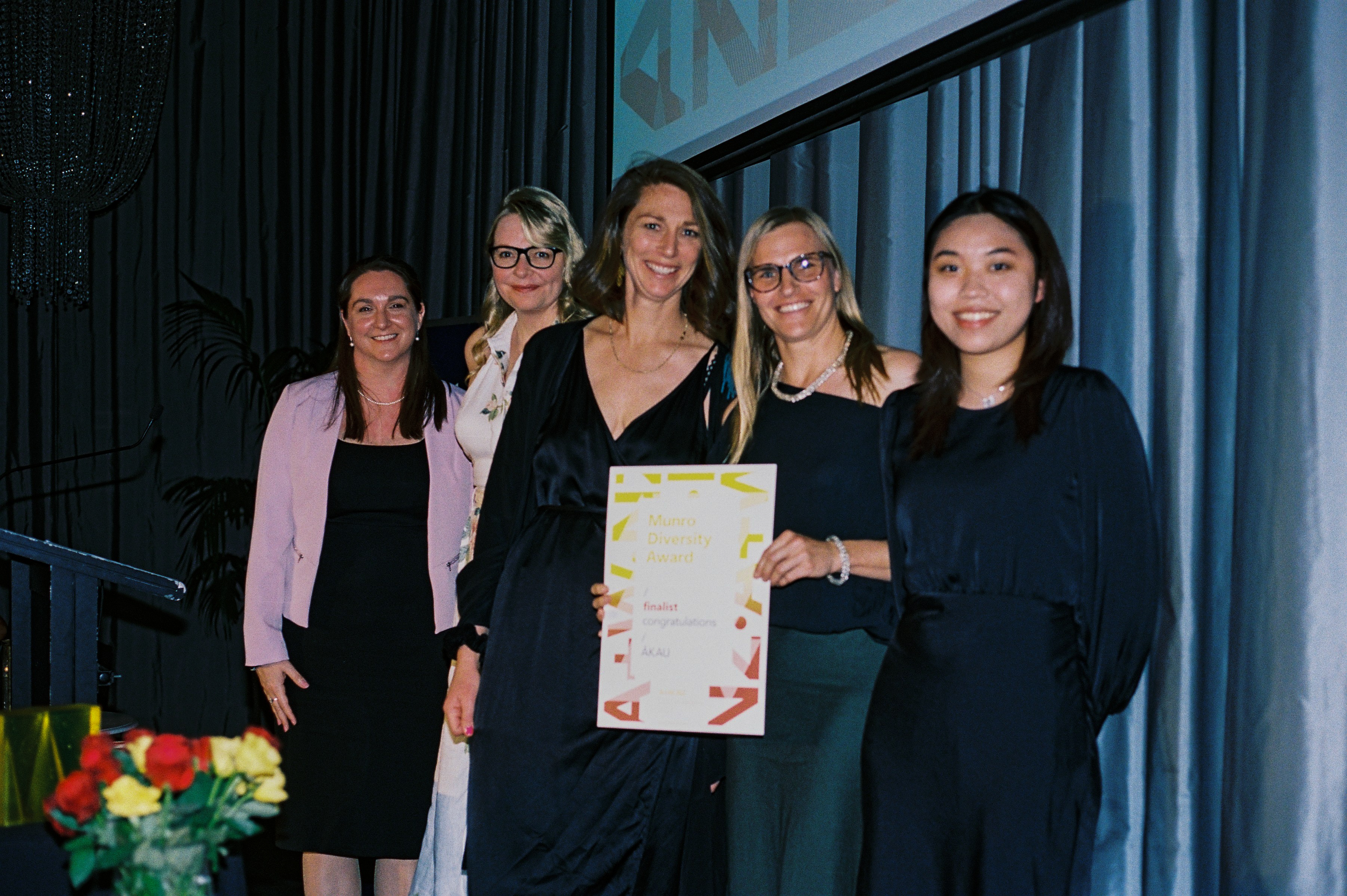
- Brenchley (second from the right) at the 2023 A+W NZ Awards
- Born: New Zealand
- Education: University of Auckland; RMIT University
- Occupation: Architect
- Practice: ĀKAU Studio; Felicity Brenchley Architects

Felicity Brenchley is a New Zealand registered architect, with practices based in Kaikohe and Auckland. Her work is noted for its engagement with local communities and involving them in the design process.

Brenchley graduated from the University of Auckland with a Bachelor of Architectural Studies in 2003, and later gained a Master of Architecture from the RMIT University in 2009. She co-founded, along with two other architects, ĀKAU Studio in Kaikohe, with the practice placing a focus on community engagement. It runs a design studio alongside an education foundation for local youth. In 2013, she founded a sole practice, Felicity Brenchley Architects, and has worked on several residential projects in Auckland. In 2016, Felicity became a member of the Foundation North Catalyst for Change programme.

In 2020, Brenchley was shortlisted for that year's Architecture + Women NZ Leadership Award. In 2022, Brenchley won an interior design award for the renovation of her personal home, a Mid-century modern bungalow. In 2023, the ĀKAU Studio was awarded the John Sutherland Practice Award by the New Zealand Institute of Architects, in recognition of the collaboration and engagement the practice has with local communities. In 2023, ĀKAU was a finalist in the A+W NZ Dulux Awards for the Munro Diversity Award.

A domestic residence, designed by Brenchley for herself and her family, was the subject of Grand Designs New Zealand Season 8, Episode 5. The episode, broadcast on 21 November 2023, chartered the build of a single-level brick-clad three-bedroom house, sited at Mahurangi Harbour, near Warkworth.
