= Judi Keith-Brown =

New Zealand architect

- Born: Judith Mary Keith; 1962 (age 63–64); Wellington, New Zealand
- Education: Victoria University of Wellington
- Occupation: Architect
- Years active: 1989–present
- Spouse: Ewan Brown
- Relatives: Kenneth Keith (father)
- Practice: JKBA – Judi Keith-Brown Architects

Judith Mary Keith-Brown (née Keith; born 1962) is a New Zealand architect. She served as president of the New Zealand Institute of Architects from 2020 to 2022.

== Biography ==
Keith-Brown was born Judith Mary Keith in Wellington in 1962, the daughter of Jocelyn Keith (née Buckett), a nurse and midwife, and Kenneth Keith, a lawyer and judge. As a child, she lived in the United States with her family for two periods: in Boston from 1964 to 1965 while her father studied law at Harvard University; and in New York City between 1968 and 1970 when her father was a member of the United Nations Secretariat.

She studied architecture at Victoria University of Wellington, graduating with a Bachelor of Architecture degree in 1991. While at university, she met and married her husband, Ewan Brown, also an architect. Keith-Brown worked in a small firm on graduating, before moving to Scotland and working in Glasgow on public housing projects. On returning to New Zealand, she tutored in design at Victoria University and continued to practise as an architect.

Keith-Brown served as president of the New Zealand Institute of Architects for a two-year term, from 2020 to 2022, and was succeeded in the role by Judith Taylor.
