= Futuna Chapel =

Coordinates: 41.2818°S 174.7387°E

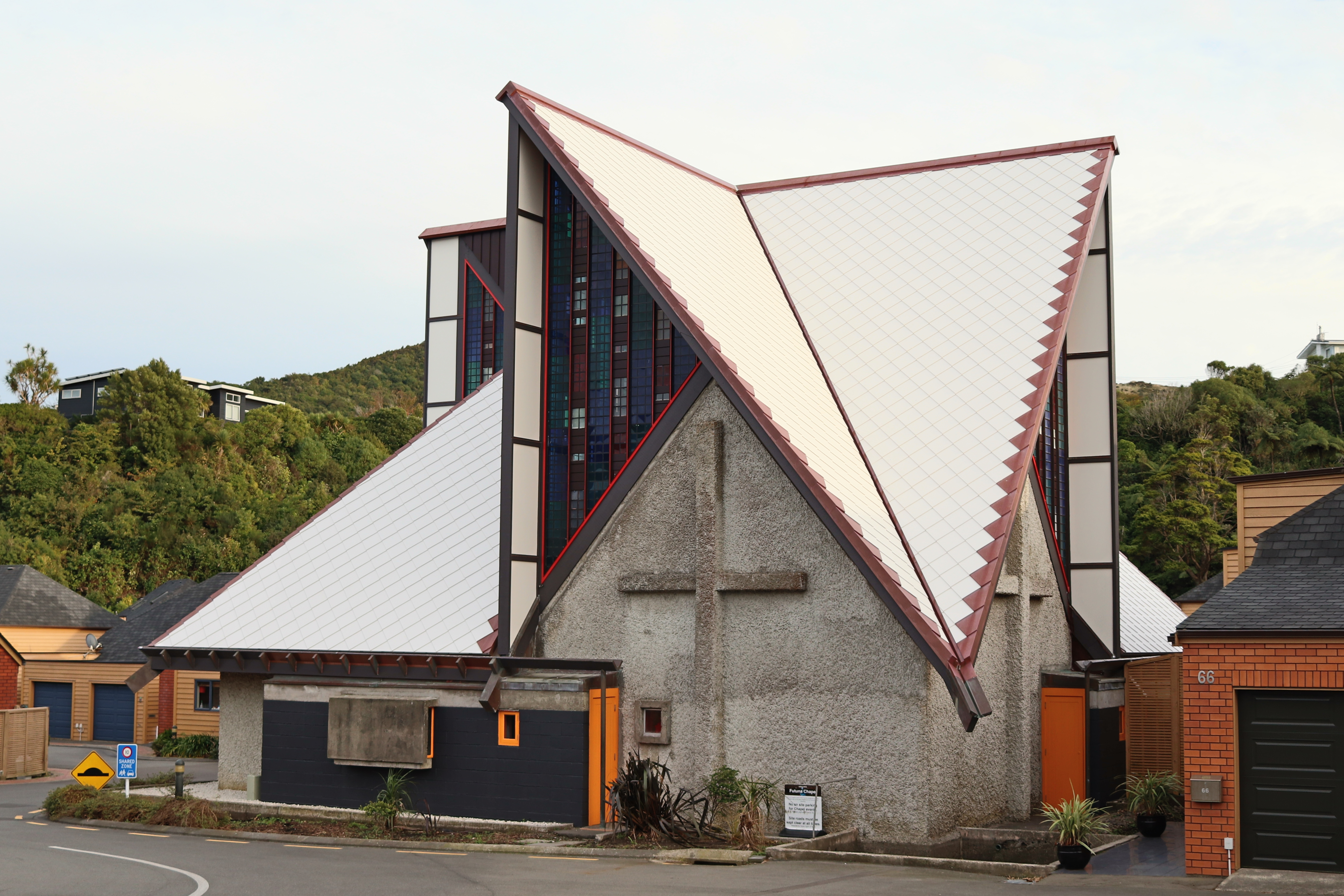

General information
- Type: Chapel
- Location: Friend St, Karori, Wellington, New Zealand
- Construction started: 1958
- Completed: 1961
- Owner: Friends of Futuna Trust

Design and construction
- Architect: John Scott
- Awards: NZIA Gold Medal (1968); NZIA 25-year award (1986)

Heritage New Zealand – Category 1
- Designated: 28-May-1999
- Reference no.: 7446

Futuna Chapel is a building in Wellington, New Zealand designed by the architect John Scott.

Built by the brothers of the Society of Mary, the chapel is named after the Pacific Island of Futuna on which the missionary Peter Chanel, to whom the project is dedicated, was martyred in 1841. It was awarded the New Zealand Institute of Architects gold medal in 1968 and its 25-year Award in 1986. The Historic Places Trust has placed it on its register as a Category 1 Historic Site.

== History ==
The Society of Mary's Karori Centre was formed in 1948 by converting an Edwardian villa previously owned by Sidney Kirkcaldie of Kirkcaldie & Stains Ltd. In 1958 Hawke's Bay architect John Scott was approached to design the Futuna Retreat Chapel. The Chapel was built in 1961 by the brothers themselves, with the only sub-contractor being an electrician.

== Siting ==
The building was originally located on a property at 62-66 Friend Street, Karori, Wellington. Set back from the street, the building is entered from the north-west corner. The Chapel was then situated between three existing buildings, an administration block and two accommodation blocks.

== Construction ==
Floors are of concrete slab construction and paved with flagstones internally. The walls are a combination of in-situ concrete and concrete block. Walls have a rough plaster finish both inside and out, and concrete block walls are left exposed. The roof is of timber framed construction and was originally clad with asbestos shingles. The main roof is supported by a central timber post and braced with timber struts. The ceiling features exposed rafters and timber sarking. The triangular clerestory windows are formed of gridded clear and coloured perspex. The pews are made of concrete supports and timber benches.

== Significance ==
In Futuna Chapel, John Scott employed a composite language that references a number of different architectural traditions. The central timber post can be seen as an interpretation of the centre posts of the traditional Māori meeting house or wharenui. The steeply pitched roof forms also allude to the entry porch of the wharenui, with its prominent sweeping barge boards (maihi).

The influence of Le Corbusier may be discerned in the rough plastered concrete work, exposed concrete beams and the way the interior is dramatized by light brought into the building by high windows. Precedents may be seen at both Ronchamp and Sainte Marie de La Tourette. Care is taken to clearly express the junctions of different materials by negative detailing and the projection of beams past their point of support. The use of diagonal symmetry, gridded planning and modular dimensions all relate the building to both high modernism and classical architecture.

The roof structure is exposed within the building, and the means of support are made explicit in the Gothic tradition of a battle against gravity. The extensive use of timber for the roof, with exposed sarking, struts and rafters is typical of architect-designed New Zealand houses of the 60s and 70s that delight in the virtuosic display of carpentry work.

A book about the building called 'Voices of Silence (New Zealand's Chapel of Futuna)' was published by Victoria University Press 1987. The author was Russell Walden, then a Reader in the History of Architecture at Victoria University in Wellington. In the book, Walden sets out his thesis that the building represents a blending of Māori and European architectural concepts. On one hand it is a modernist building that uses geometrical forms and influences of the Modern Movement. It also represents aspects of a marae, such as a large centre pole and sharply sloping eaves. Walden claimed John Scott achieved a fusion of elements of architecture not seen before.

== Current condition ==
In 2000, the Society of Mary had no further use for the Futuna Retreat and sold it to Wellington builder Art Potter. Subsequently, the buildings surrounding the chapel were removed and replaced with medium-density housing units designed by Hunt Davies Tennent Ltd. The chapel itself was protected from demolition by the Wellington District Plan. While the 66 residential properties now forming Futuna Village were being built, the chapel was used to store materials. While tarnished, most of the fixtures and fittings remain in good condition, but Jim Allen's centrepiece wooden sculpture of the Crucifixion disappeared. In early September 2012 the missing Crucifixion sculpture was discovered by police on a farm in Ahititi in the Taranaki district. It was reinstalled in the building in early 2013 after being refurbished by the National Museum of New Zealand.

Concern about the building's future came from many quarters, leading to the formation of the Friends of Futuna Charitable Trust spearheaded by Simon Mclellan. After lengthy negotiations, an agreement was reached in 2006 between the Friends of Futuna Charitable Trust and Futuna Ltd for the sale of the Chapel and the parcel of land that it sits on to the Trust. A conservation plan has been developed by the Trust to carry out repairs and refurbishments so that the building can be appreciated as originally designed. The building fabric presents a number of challenges such as rot in some windows and externally exposed timber framing. The original asbestos diamond shaped roofing shingles were replaced by metal roofing tiles some time in the past which are unsympathetic to the architecture, and the search continues for a suitable solution. An accessible toilet was recently added to the building to enable a wider range of events to be hosted.

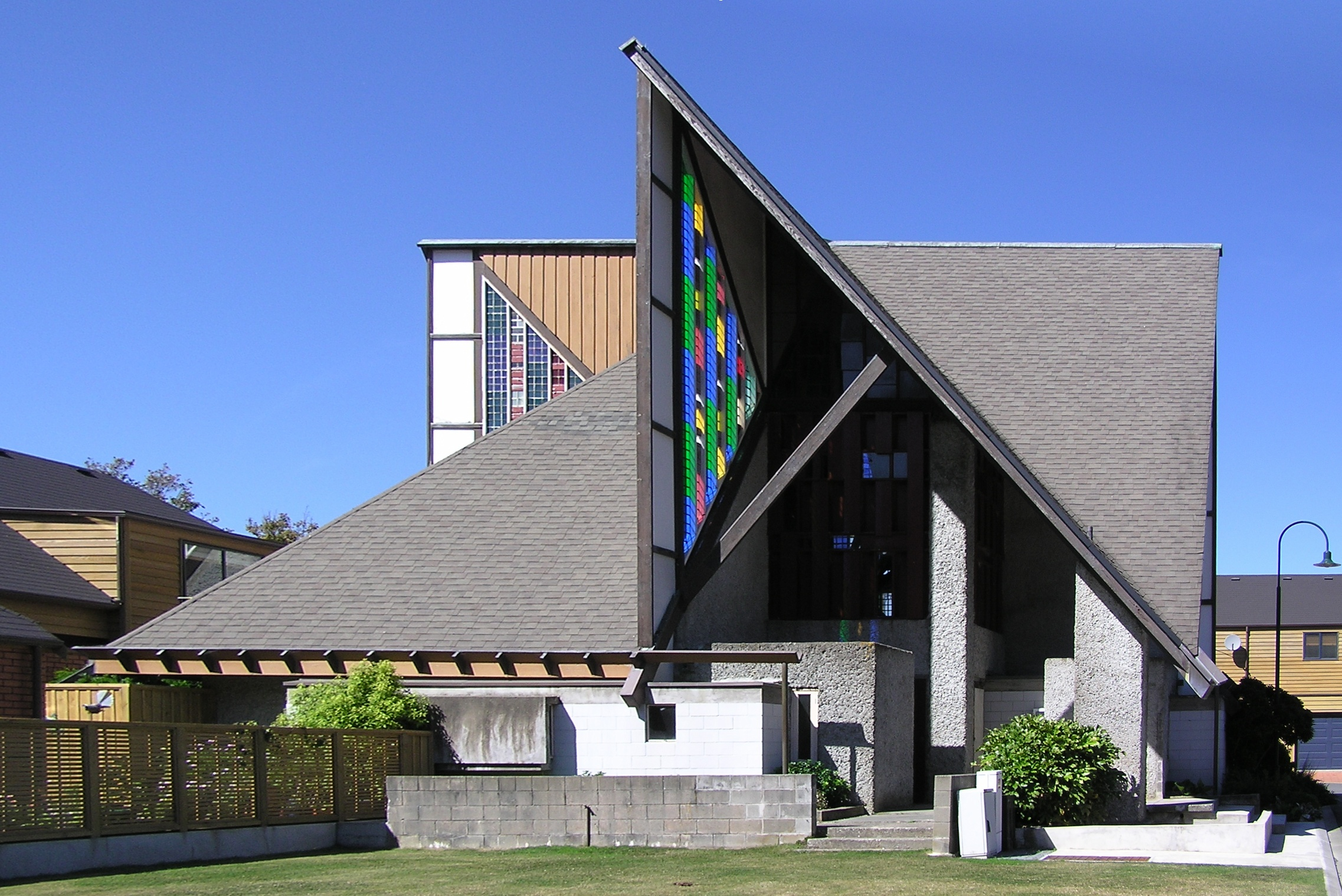
Viewed from northwest

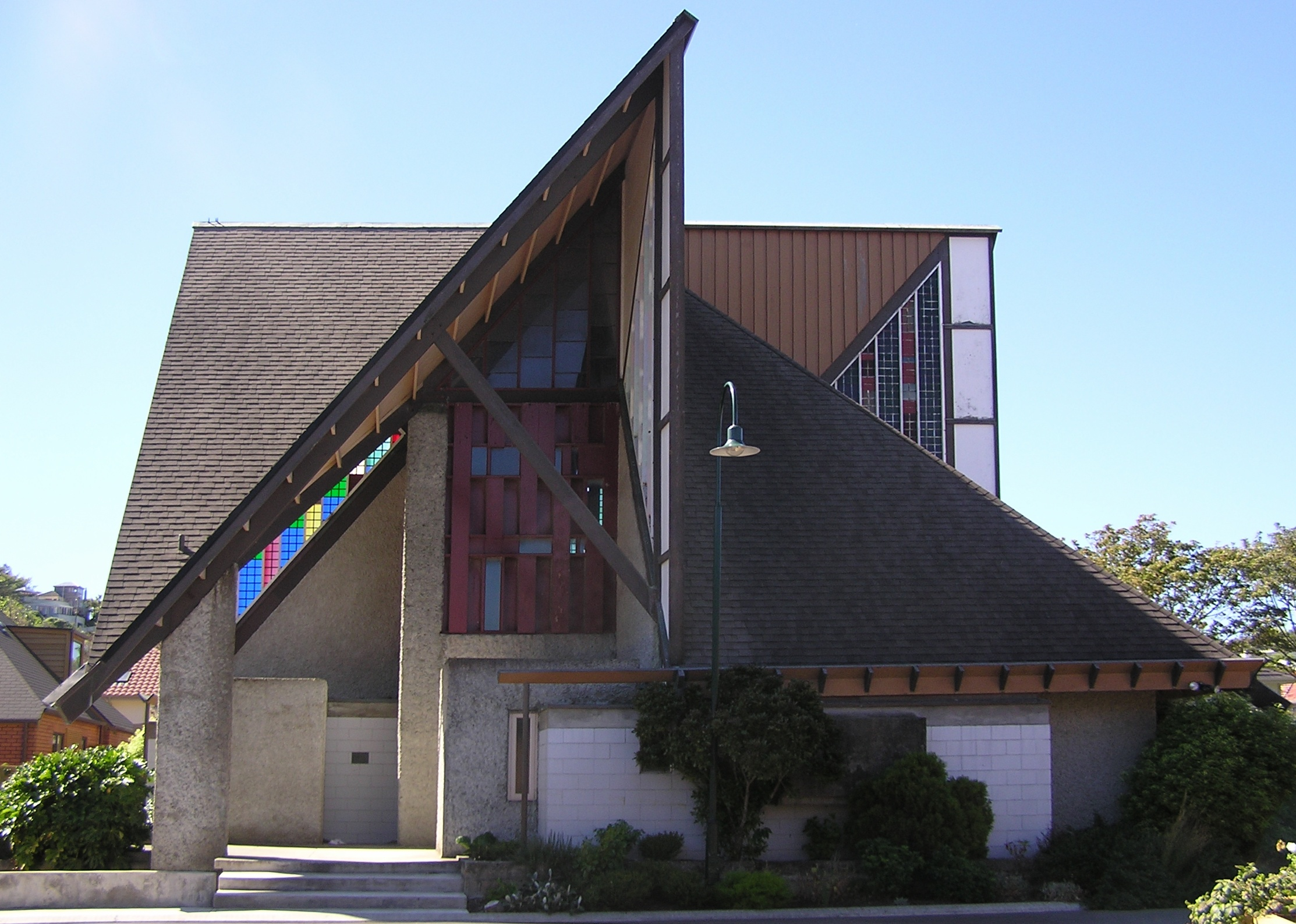
Viewed from southwest

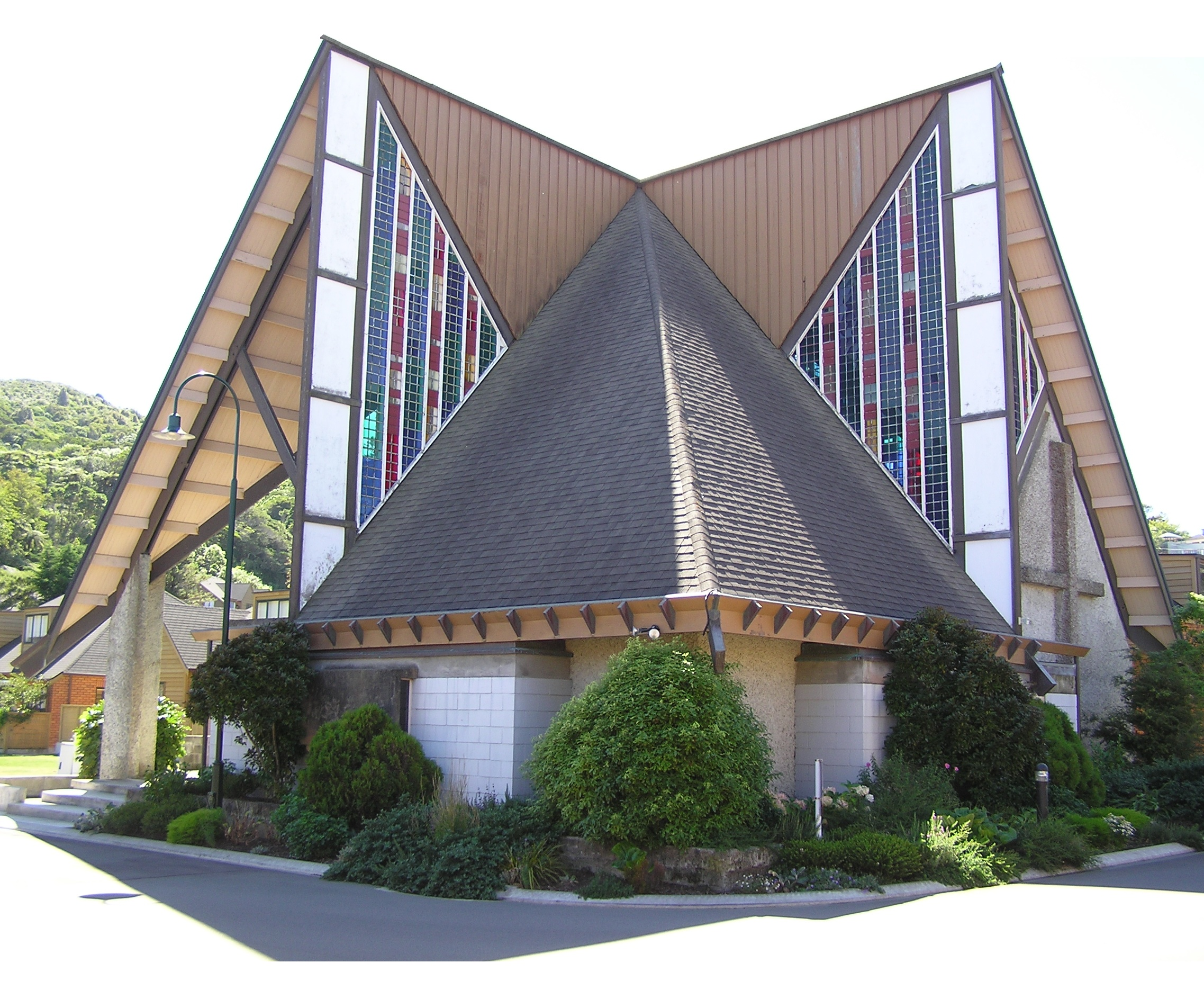
Viewed from south

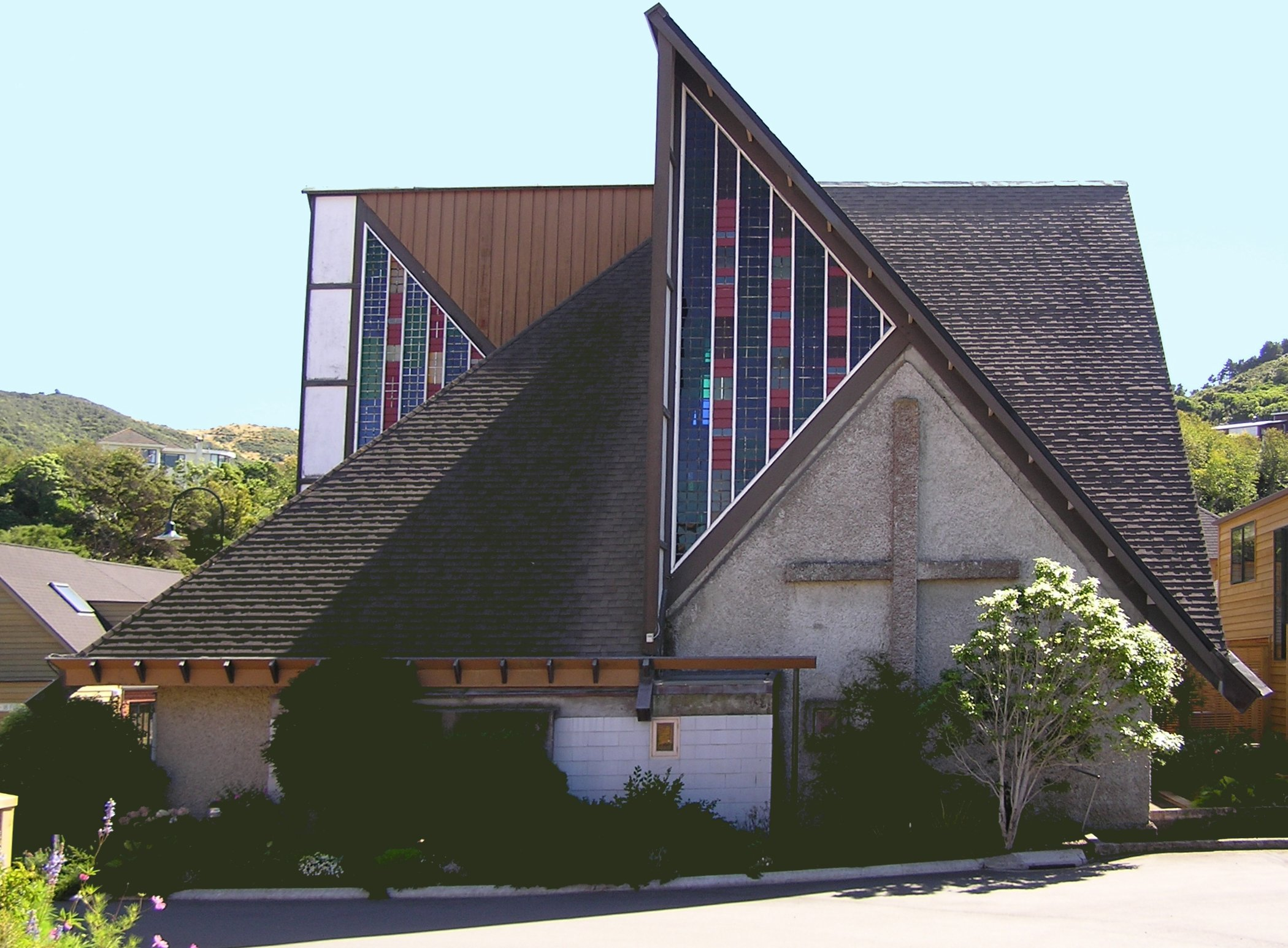
Viewed from southeast (from road)

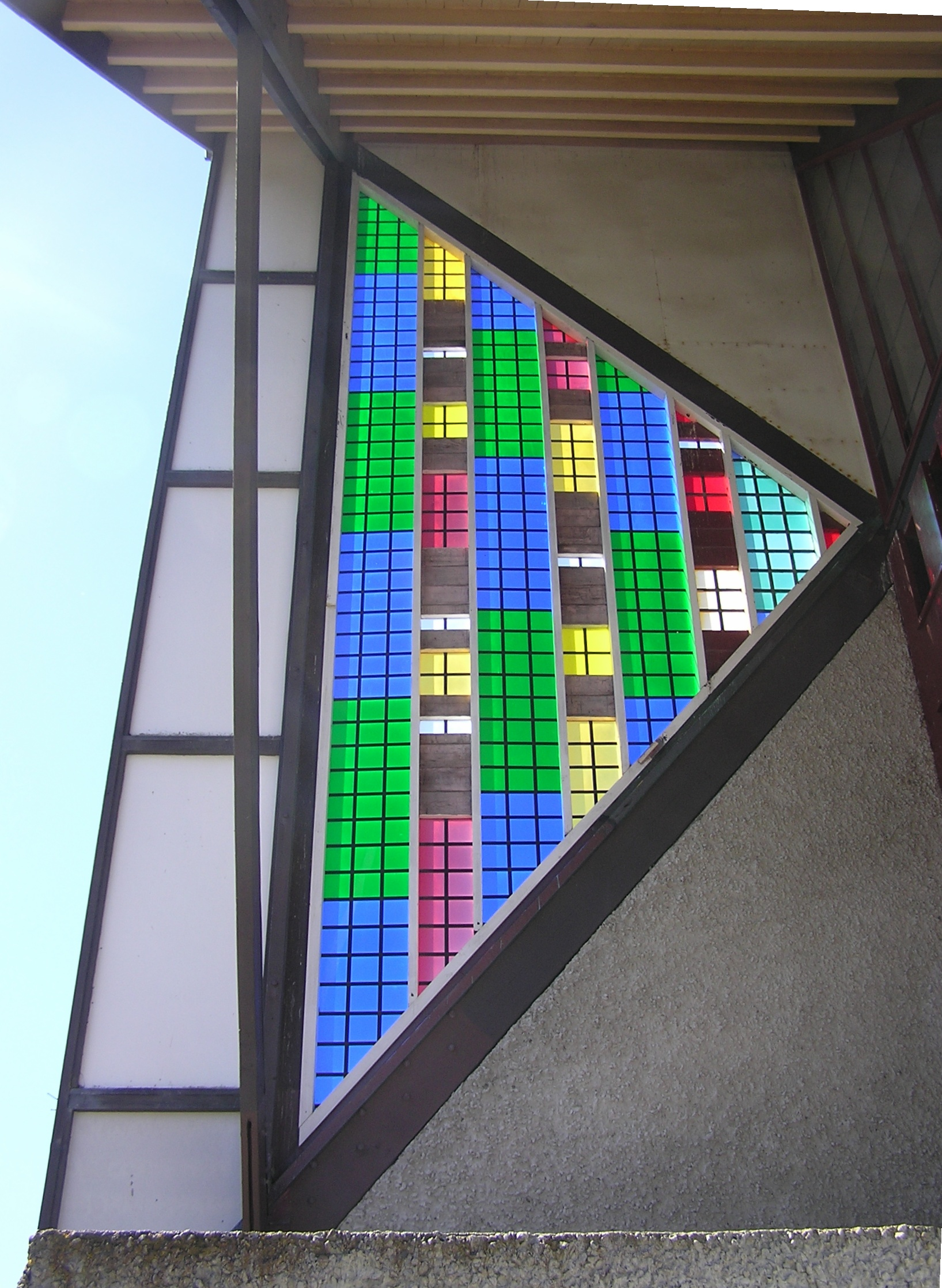
External glass roof panel

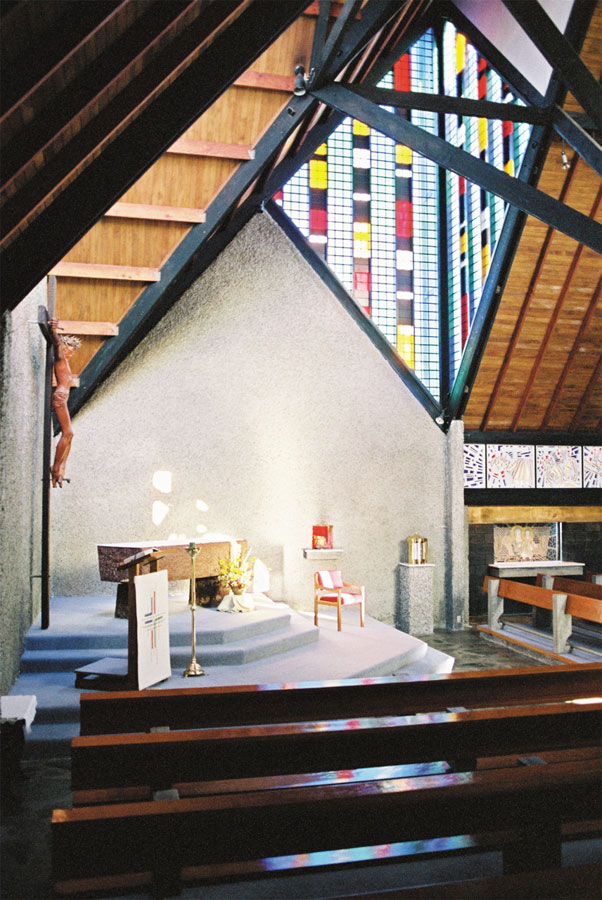
Interior view towards the altar

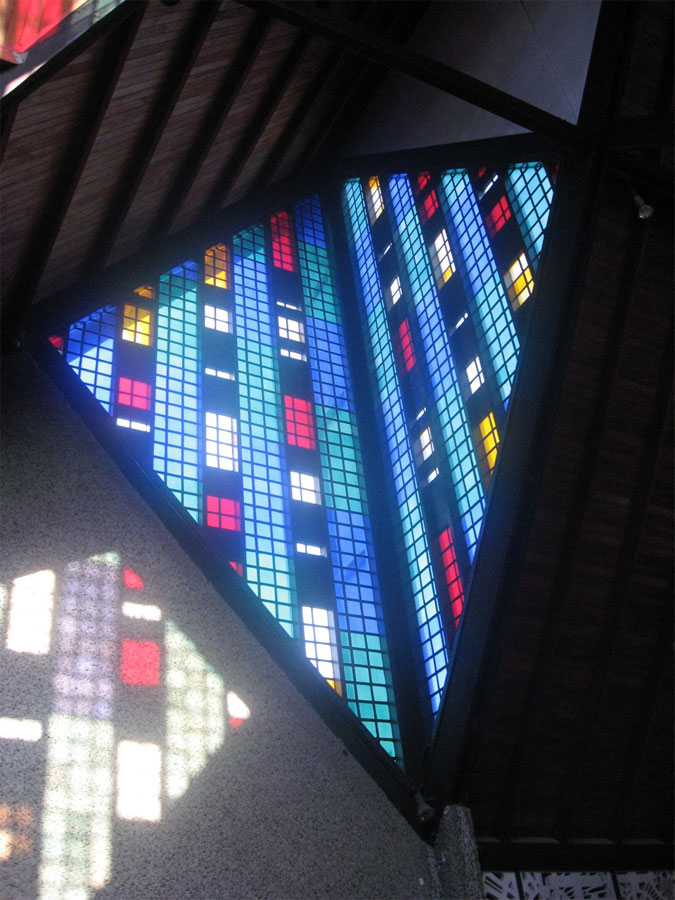
Interior view towards roof
