= Jane Aimer =

Architect in New Zealand

- Education: University of Auckland
- Occupation: Architect

Jane Elizabeth Aimer is a New Zealand architect. In New Zealand, Aimer's architectural practice was one of the first to be women-led. She was the first chairperson of the New Zealand Registered Architects Board.

== Biography ==
Aimer attended the University of Auckland's School of Architecture and Planning and then transferred to Victoria University in Wellington for two years. After graduating, she returned to Auckland and worked at architecture firm CPRW for around twelve years. She left to start her own practice. Aimer shared an office with fellow architect Lindley Naismith and in 2000 the pair joined their businesses and established Aimer Naismith Architects. Mike Dowsett joined the company shortly afterwards and it was renamed Scarlet Architects.

Aimer was one of the first architects in New Zealand to have a women-led practice.

In 2009, Aimer and Naismith designed and built mirror-image townhouses, with shared common areas, in Newmarket for themselves and their extended families to live in.

Aimer was the last chair of the Architects Education Registration Board prior to its disestablishment in the mid-2000s. She was also the first chair of the New Zealand Registered Architects Board. In 2020, Aimer convened the judging jury for the Auckland Architecture Awards.
