= Christina van Bohemen =

New Zealand architect

- Born: New Zealand
- Education: Victoria University of Wellington
- Occupation: Architect
- Awards: Chrystall Excellence Award, Distinguished Fellow of the New Zealand Institute of Architects

Christina van Bohemen is a New Zealand architect. In 2016 she was appointed president of the New Zealand Institute of Architects. She was the second female president in the 100 year history of the Institute. In 2020 she received the Chrystall Excellence Award at the Architecture + Women NZ Dulux Awards. Van Bohemen has been recognised by the New Zealand Institute of Architects as a Distinguished Fellow, an honour given to only ten people at any one time.

== Biography ==
Van Bohemen grew up in Havelock North, the youngest of five children. Her father had emigrated from Holland in 1951 and her mother from England in 1949. She attended Erskine College, a Catholic boarding school in Wellington followed by Victoria University of Wellington, where she completed a Bachelor of Arts degree in English literature.

After graduating, she travelled to New York, where her brother Gerard van Bohemen was working as a diplomat, and to London, where she worked in administrative roles in architectural practices. She met New Zealand architects Chris Moller and Alastair Scott there who encouraged her to return to university to study architecture. Returning to Wellington, she started a degree in architecture aged 29.

In 1996, van Bohemen moved to Auckland and began working at architectural firm Jasmax. In 2001, she left Jasmax and founded architecture practice Sills van Bohemen with her partner Aaron Sills. The practice specialises in urban design and residential architecture.

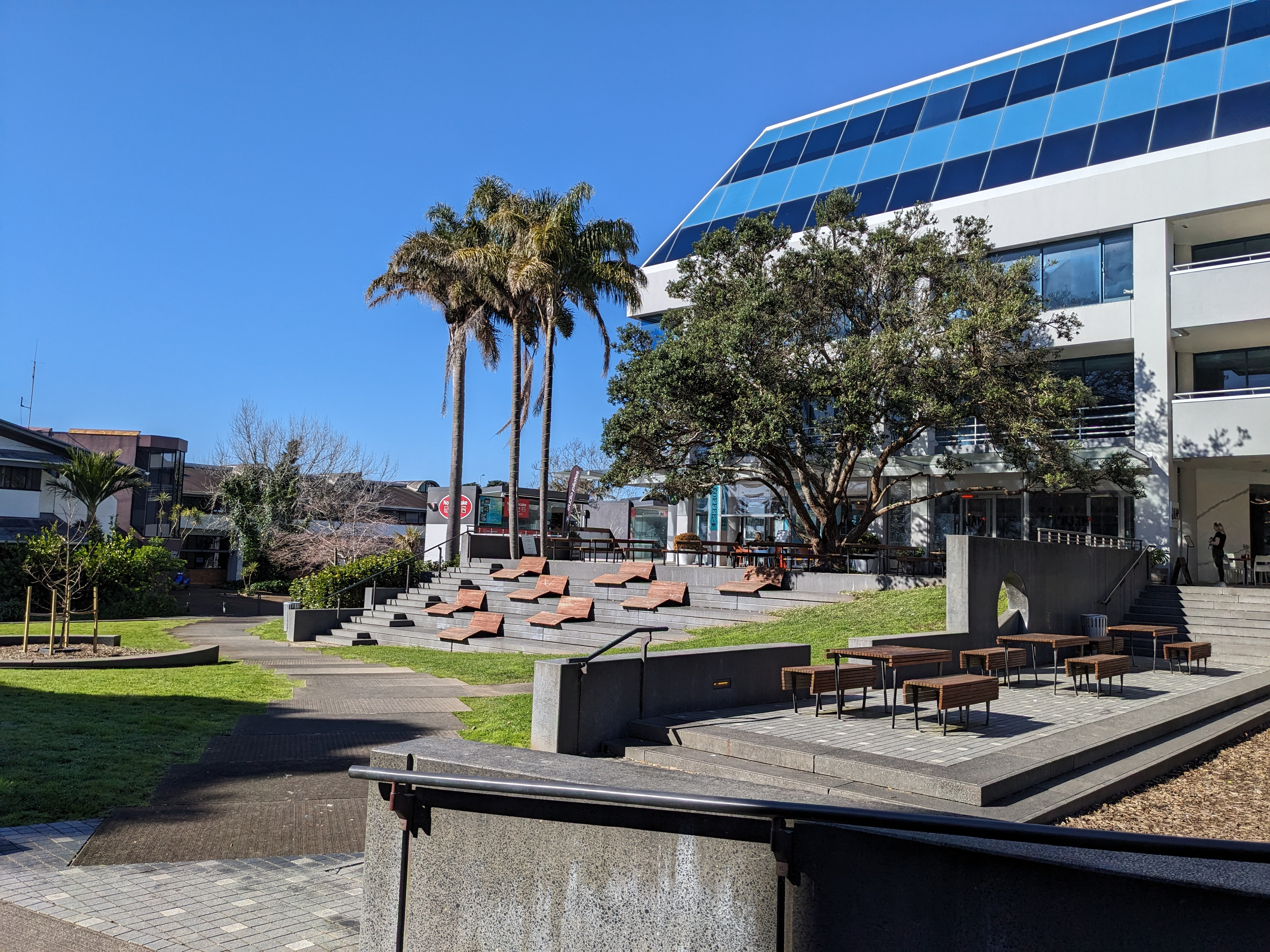
Hurstmere Green, designed by Sills Van Bohemen

In 2010 she was appointed a member of the New Zealand Registered Architects' Board. She was re-appointed for a further three-year term in 2013.

In 2016, in her role as president of the New Zealand Institute of Architects, van Bohemen became involved in the controversy over plans by the Department of Conservation to demolish the Aniwaniwa Visitors Centre at Lake Waikaremoana. The building had been designed by John Scott, a prominent Māori architect. Van Bohemen criticised the Department of Conservation for failing to maintain the building and failing to conserve New Zealand's heritage.

=== Work with the NZIA ===
From 2016 to 2018, van Bohemen served as president of Te Kāhui Whaihanga NZIA, making her the second women elected to the position. She had previously served on the NZIA council since 2011, and was the chair of the Auckland Branch from 2008-2010. Additional roles she has held include presenter on the Graduate Development Programme from 2008-2012, a member of the National awards jury in 2005, and covener (2005) and member (2004) of the Northern Region awards jury.

== Works ==
- Te Whau, Waiheke Island
- Hurstmere Green, Takapuna, Auckland (2012)
