= Keith Hobbs (footballer) =

New Zealand footballer

Personal information
- Full name: Keith A Hobbs
- Place of birth: New Zealand

Senior career*
Years	Team	Apps	(Gls)
ante 1976–post 1985	North Shore United		
ante 1985–post 1988	Papatoetoe		

International career
1980–1985	New Zealand	8	(0)
- * Club domestic league appearances and goals

Keith Hobbs is a former association football player who represented New Zealand at international level.

Hobbs made his full All Whites debut in a 2–0 win over Fiji on 20 February 1980 and ended his international playing career with eight A-international caps to his credit, his final cap also in a 2–0 win over Fiji, on 7 June 1985.

Hobbs was the first player to appear in 300 games in the New Zealand National Soccer League, a feat he achieved in 1988
