= Gerard van Bohemen =

New Zealand judge

The Honourable Gerard van Bohemen

Gerard van Bohemen is a former New Zealand judge and a former Permanent Representative of New Zealand to the United Nations (UN) in New York.

Van Bohemen received degrees in English and law from Victoria University of Wellington. He worked in private law practices in Wellington and Auckland and from 2005 to 2010 was Director of the Legal Division of the Ministry of Foreign Affairs and Trade and New Zealand's International Legal Adviser. Prior to becoming the Permanent Representative to the UN, van Bohemen was a Deputy Secretary of the Ministry. Since 2011, he has also been New Zealand's Commissioner to the International Whaling Commission.

During July 2015 and September 2016, van Bohemen was the President of the UN Security Council.

On 14 July 2017, it was announced that van Bohemen would be appointed a Justice of High Court of New Zealand.

Diplomatic posts
Preceded by Jim McLay	Permanent Representative of New Zealand to the United Nations; 2015–2017	Succeeded by Craig Hawke
