= Lindley Naismith =

Architect in New Zealand

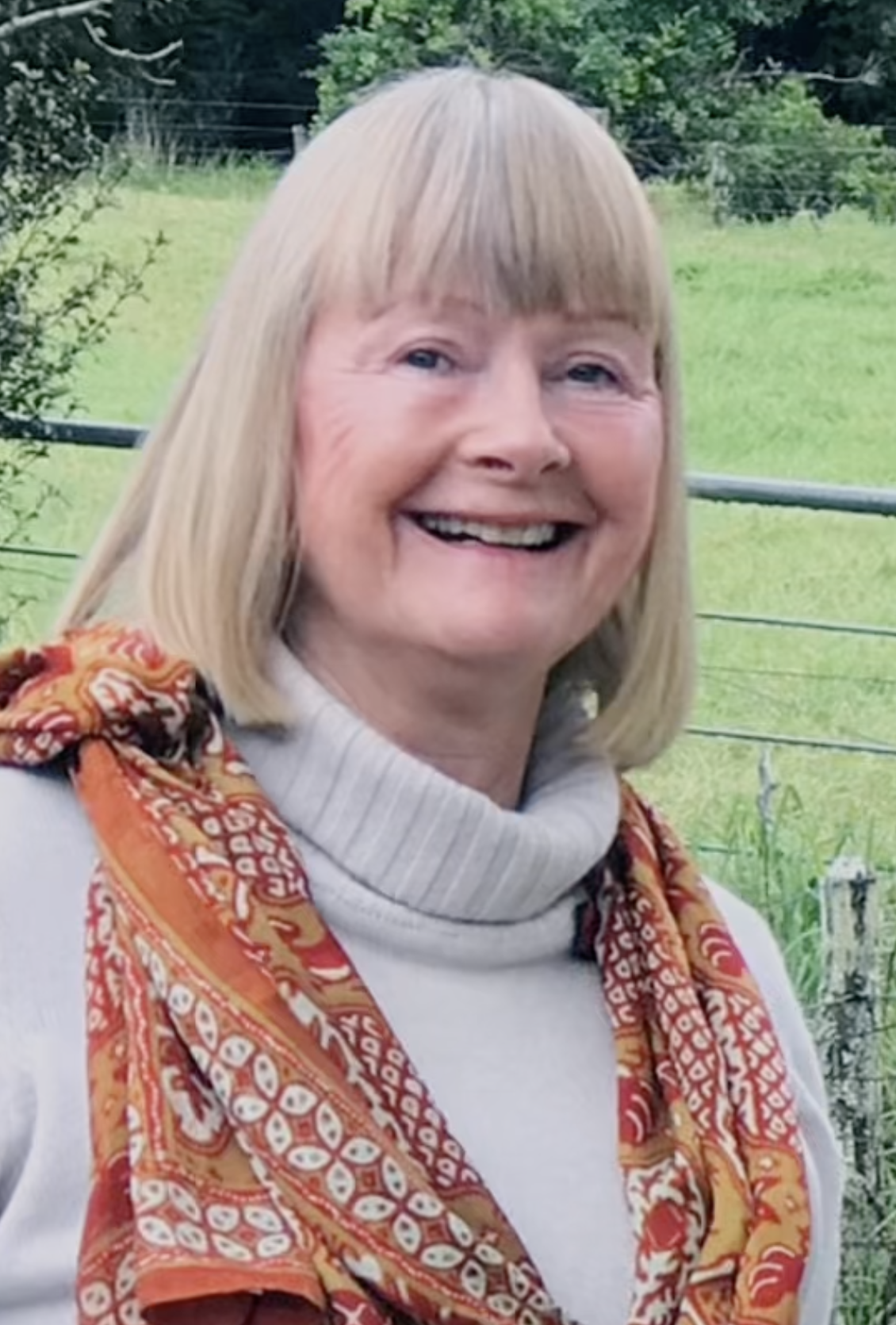
- Lindley Naismith in 2022
- Born: New Zealand
- Education: University of Auckland
- Occupation: Architect
- Practice: Scarlet Architects

Lindley Rae Naismith is a New Zealand architect and Distinguished Fellow of the NZIA. She established Scarlet Architects and went on to co-create the Scarlet Prize in Architecture. Naismith has performed the role of judge for the New Zealand Home of the Year Award as well as the Te Kahui Wahaihanga New Zealand Institute of Architects awards. She is a fellow of the New Zealand Institute of Architects and in 2017 won the Munro Diversity Award at the Architecture + Women NZ Dulux Awards.

== Early life and education ==
Naismith grew up in Whangārei with three siblings. Her father was a mariner at Northport and her mother had been a nurse before her marriage.

Naismith studied architecture at the University of Auckland, graduating in 1982.

== Career ==
Her first job was at the Auckland Regional Authority, followed by positions in small architectural firms. In 1987, she opened her own practice, Lindley Naismith: Naismith Architects.

Naismith shared an office with fellow architect Jane Aimer and in 2000 the pair joined their businesses and established Aimer Naismith Architects. Mike Dowsett joined the company shortly afterwards and it was renamed Scarlet Architects. In 2018, Naismith and Aimer created the Scarlet Prize in Architecture, awarded annually to a high-achieving female student at the University of Auckland.

Naismith has been judge for the New Zealand Home of the Year Award and several Te Kahui Whaihanga New Zealand Institute of Architects awards. From 2019 to 2021, Naismith was co-chair of Architecture + Women NZ. She is a fellow of the New Zealand Institute of Architects and has been chair of the institute's Auckland branch.

=== Awards and honours ===
In 2017, Naismith won the Munro Diversity Award at the Architecture + Women NZ Dulux Awards. The NZIA recognised Naismith as a Distinguished Fellow in November 2025.

=== Twin House ===
In 2009, Aimer and Naismith designed and built identical townhouses, with shared common areas, in Newmarket for themselves and their extended families to live in. Dubbed "a social experiment", the design allowed for experimentation of community, intensification, and intergenerational living.

== Select Projects ==
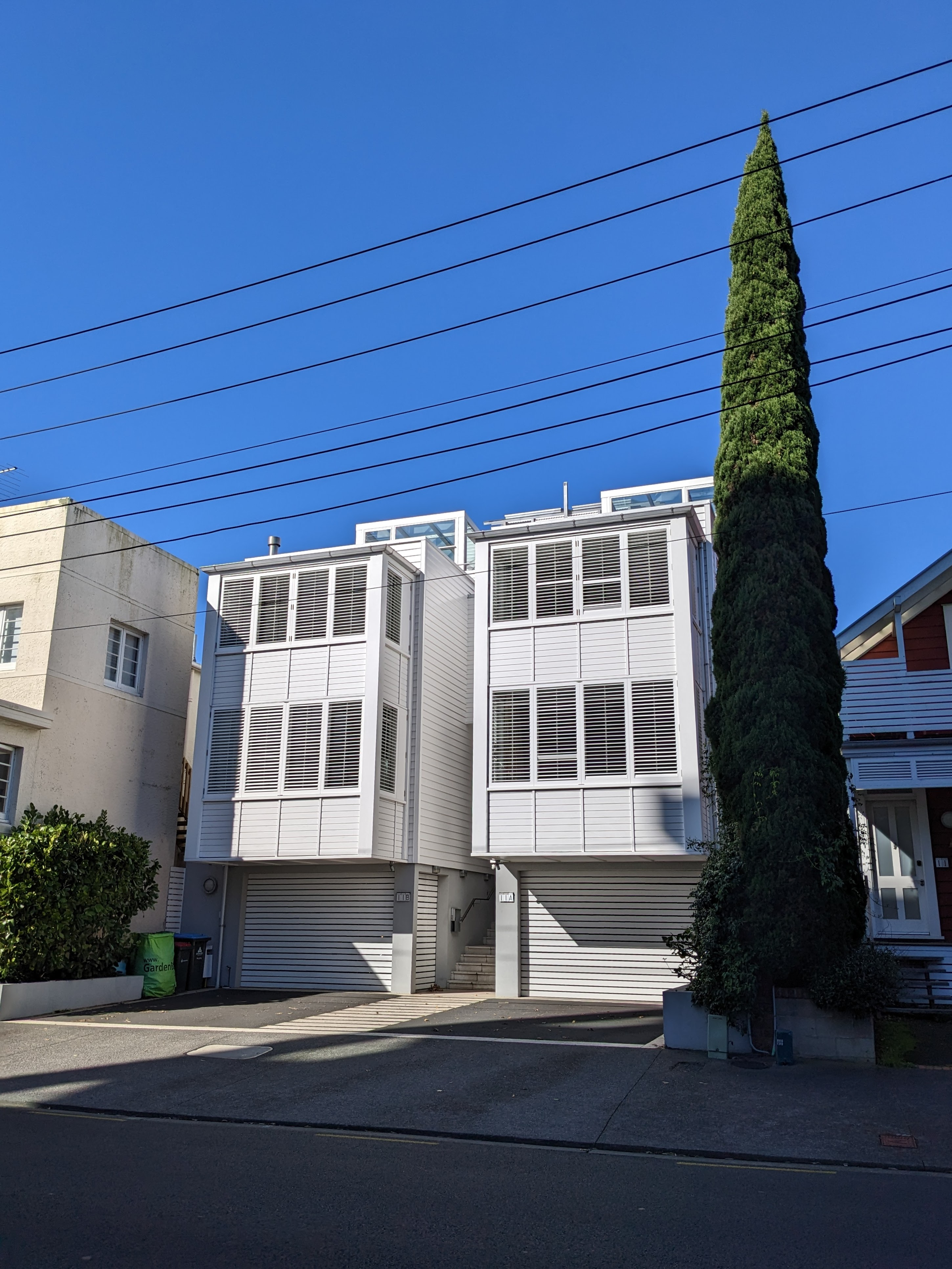
Twin House in Newmarket

=== Scarlet Architects ===
- Twin House, Newmarket, Auckland (2009)
- Pahi Bach, Auckland (2012) DINZ Best Design Awards 2014 Silver 2012 NZIA Auckland Architecture Awards - Housing Winner
- Freeman's Bay House, Auckland (2015) Alterations and Additions
- Ridge House, Onetangi, Waiheke Island (2018)
- Hot Water Beach House (2020) DINZ Best Design Awards 2021 Bronze 2020 NZIA Waikato/Bay of Plenty Architecture Awards - Housing Winner
- Skinny House, Waiheke Island (2021) DINZ Best Design Awards 2021 Finalist
- Leigh Bach, Leigh DINZ Best Design Awards 2016 Bronze
- Villa 2014 Alterations and Additions
