= John Leijh =

New Zealand footballer

Personal information
- Full name: John M Leijh
- Place of birth: New Zealand
- Positions: Midfielder; fullback

Senior career*
Years	Team	Apps	(Gls)
- Mount Wellington

International career
1979–1984	New Zealand	14	(0)
- * Club domestic league appearances and goals

John Leijh is an association football player who represented New Zealand at international level.

Leijh made his full All Whites debut in a 6–0 win over Fiji on 29 June 1979 and ended his international playing career with 14 A-international caps to his credit, his final cap an appearance in a 2–1 win over Fiji on 18 October 1984. He is now married with 4 children (1 son and 3 daughters) and works as a registered architect.
