= New Zealand Registered Architects Board =

The New Zealand Registered Architects Board (NZRAB), is the authority in New Zealand that assesses, registers, monitors and disciplines architects in New Zealand. It gains its authority from the Registered Architects Act 2005, and replaced the Architects Education and Registration Board which had similar responsibilities under the now repealed Architects Act 1963, but less powers of assessment and discipline.

== Members ==
Members are recommended by the appropriate Cabinet Minister, and appointed to the board by the Governor-General. There are 6 to 8 members of the board, and up to four members of the board may be nominated to the Minister by the New Zealand Institute of Architects (NZIA).

== Functions ==
The Board has the following functions under the Act:

- to make rules regarding registration of architects
- to assess applicants for registration and register those that meet the required standards
- to maintain a publicly available register
- to investigate complaints about architects and to discipline architects
- to provide information to the public on the system of architect registration.

== The title Architect ==
Under the Registered Architects Act 2005 section 7, the title "Registered Architect" is restricted to Architects registered by the NZRAB only. The title "Architect" can only be used in New Zealand by a Registered Architect in the context of offering or providing building design services. The title "Architect" can be used by others where building design is not involved, e.g. landscape architect, marine architect, software architect etc. An Architect registered in another jurisdiction can use the title in NZ, so long as its origin is made clear, e.g. Bill Smith, Registered Architect (UK).

The identity of Architects in New Zealand can be confirmed by a search of the online New Zealand Architects Register at www.nzrab.org.nz. There are approximately 1670 New Zealand Registered Architects.

Building design work is not restricted in New Zealand to Architects. Any person can design a building in New Zealand, although the "Restricted Work" requirement in the Building Act means that only an Architect or a Licensed Building Practitioner - Design can design and get a building consent for a stand-alone home or a small residential apartment.
