= John Scott (architect) =

New Zealand architect (1924–1992)

John Colin Scott (9 June 1924 – 30 July 1992) was a New Zealand architect of the 20th century, known for his unique buildings that incorporated ideas from Maori and cultural architecture.

== Early life ==
John Colin Scott was born in Haumoana, Hawke’s Bay on 9 June 1924, the third of seven children of Kathleen Hiraani Blake and Charles Hudson Scott, a farmer. His mother and father both had British ancestry, while his father was also a descendant of Te Arawa.

John Scott had a typical Hawke's Bay childhood, riding to Haumona School on horseback. Then attending St John's College in Hastings where he was head prefect and captain of the school's First XV rugby team. After leaving school he found work as a shepherd, before volunteering for the air force as the Second World War came to an end.

In 1946 he studied at the School of Architecture at Auckland University College, but he was unsure of what he wanted to do. He disliked the university academic environment and by 1950 he reduced himself to studying part-time. Scott never achieved his architecture diploma from the college, but he was influenced by teachers Vernon Brown and Bill Wilson. In 1951 he married Wilson's sister-in-law Joan Moffatt in Auckland.

== Architectural career ==
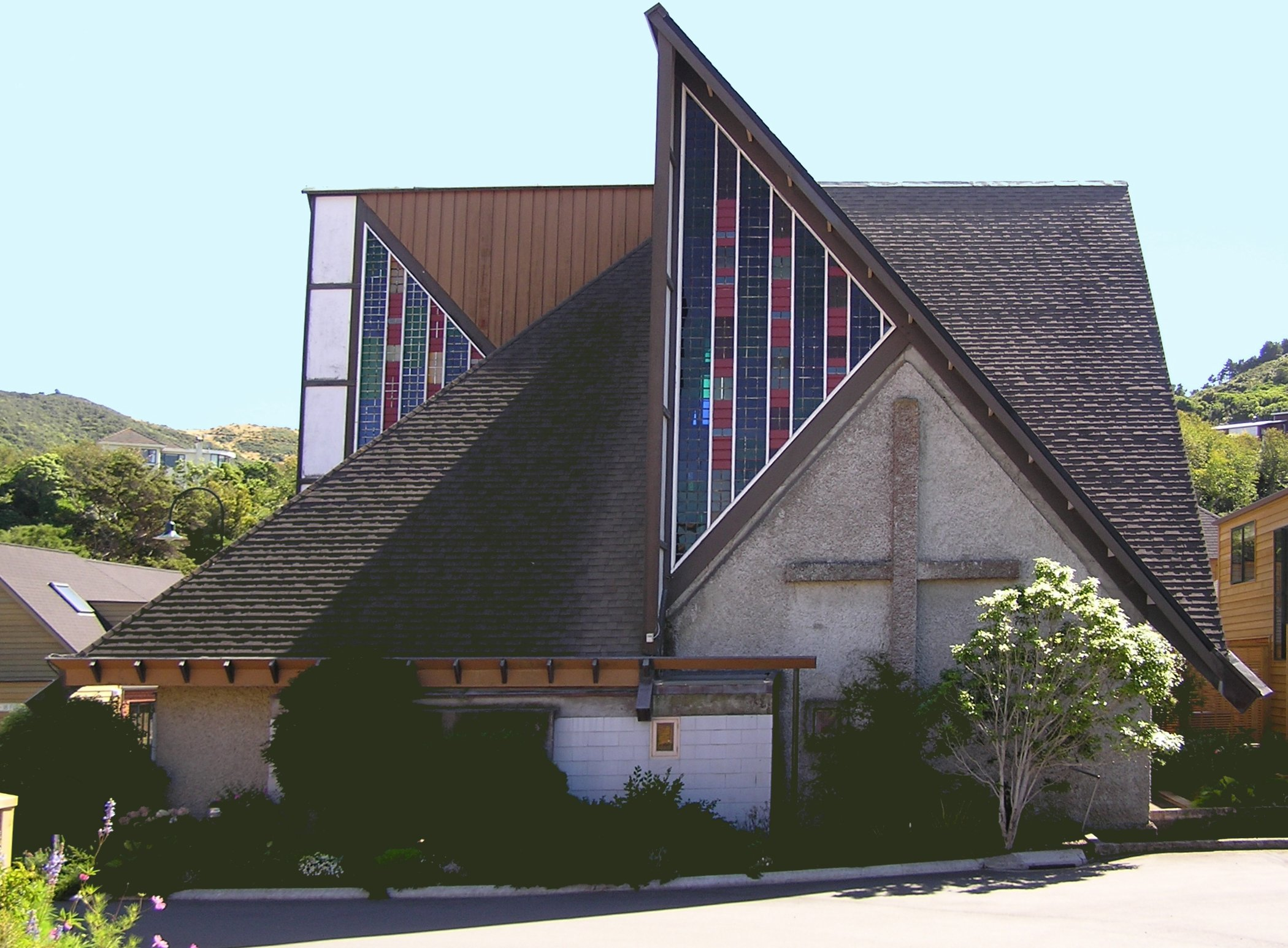
Futuna Chapel viewed from the south east

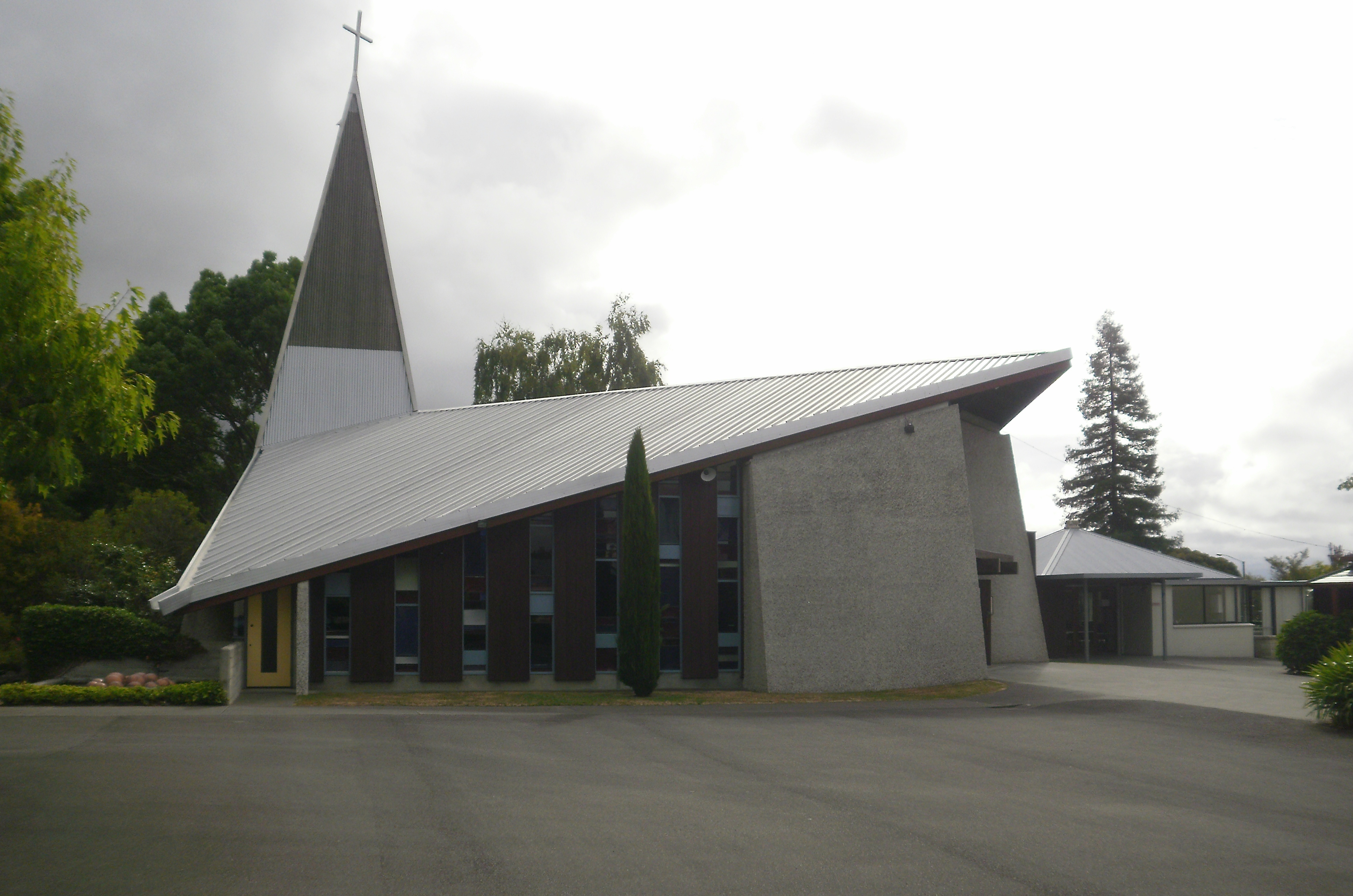
Our Lady of Lourdes, Havelock North

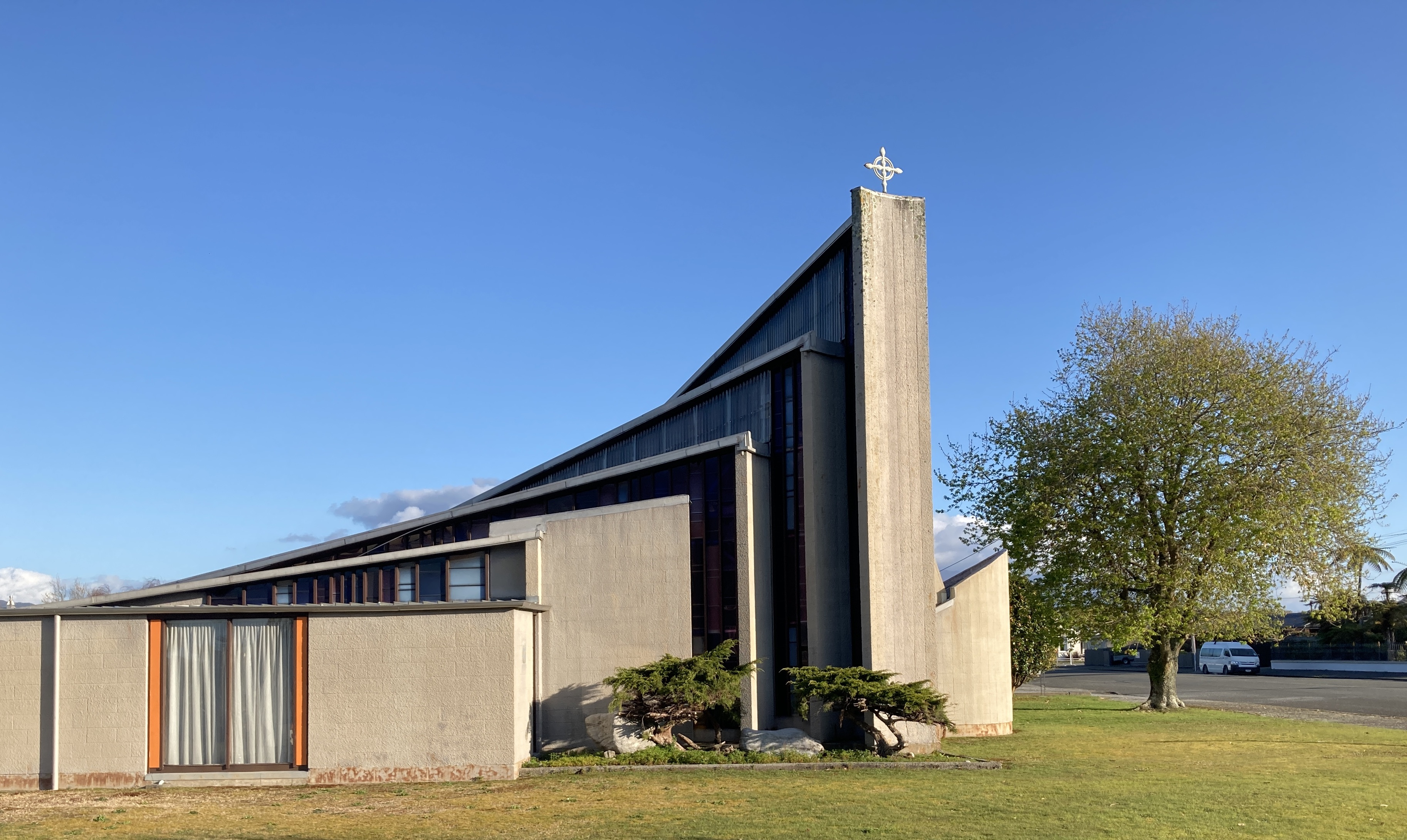
St Canice's, Westport

After leaving university he worked for two architectural firms. later he decided to move back to Haumona in the Hawke's Bay with his wife and work for himself. His initial jobs were mostly private houses, like the Savage House and the Falls House in Havelock North (1952–53). As he developed his individual style, he became inspired by traditional New Zealand buildings such as the whare and woolshed, elements of which can be seen in his later work. Much of his work is characterised by strong geometric shapes.

His first church was designed for St John's College in Hastings (1954–56). This led to the commission of a Marist chapel in Karori, Wellington. This project, the Chapel of Futuna (1958–61), is arguably the best work of his career, and is recognised nationally and internationally. The chapel incorporates ideas from a whare - a central pole, ribs of rafters and low eaves. The building won the New Zealand Institute of Architects gold medal in 1968, and the first 25-year Award in 1986.

Scott mostly worked on private commissions, many of which were located in the Hawke's Bay region where he grew up. One of Scott's last projects before he died was John's House, a holiday accommodation located in Havelock North. This was the second home that decorated World War II veteran John Pattison commissioned John Scott to build, and it was completed in 1990.

Besides public commissions, Scott designed several other public buildings. The Maori Battalion Memorial Centre in Palmerston North (1954–64) used carved panels and tukutuku for decoration. The Urewera National Park Headquarters building (1974–76) was designed as a pavilion to suit the neighbouring bush, and shows that sense of place and landscape were critical to his architectural thinking.

== Death and subsequent recognition ==
John Scott died on 30 July 1992 in Auckland after a major heart operation. In 1999 he was awarded another gold medal by the New Zealand Institute of Architects for his unique contribution to architecture.

== See also ==
- Futuna Chapel
- St Canice's Church, Westport
