= New Zealand Institute of Architects =

Professional body in New Zealand

- Formation: 1905, reformed by Architects Act 1963
- Type: Professional body
- Location: Auckland, New Zealand
- Region served: New Zealand
- Members: about 4000
- President: James Blackburne
- Chief executive: Mark Abbot
- Website: nzia.co.nz

The New Zealand Institute of Architects (NZIA) (Māori: Te Kāhui Whaihanga) is a membership-based professional organisation that represents approximately 90 per cent of registered architects in New Zealand and supports and promotes architecture in New Zealand.

The organisation was founded in 1905 and is committed to supporting members by providing ongoing professional training and material and services that are essential to their work.

The Institute has eight branches throughout the country and is headed by a president who serves a two-year term. The day-to-day functions of the Institute are undertaken by an Auckland-based team led by a chief executive.

== History ==
Prior to 1905, various Institutes of Architects existed in cities around New Zealand, but these had no standing outside their local areas. It was decided that a national body would ensure consistency, and the New Zealand Institute of Architects was established late in 1905, with William Chatfield as its first president.

In 1911 several members left the organisation and formed the rival Society of Architects due to a dispute over pricing policies, but by 1913 this dispute was resolved and the Society of Architects was dissolved.

The Institute of Architects was reformed in the 1960s due to the Architects Act 1963 splitting functions between the Institute and the New Zealand Registered Architects Board (NZRAB). It became an incorporated society in 1992.

In 2019 the Institute changed its name to add a Māori Language part: Te Kāhui Whaihanga New Zealand Institute of Architects. This process was undertaken with the Māori design network Ngā Aho, and the Māori name was gifted by Haare Williams. He said: "The name Te Kāhui Whaihanga is not only about architecture, but it's also about building a nation; building a future and building a people. It's to do with identity."

In 2019 NZIA also signed a covenant with Ngā Aho to include how the Institute could acknowledge the Treaty of Waitangi, as well as Māori. NZIA Councillor Elisapeta Heta had this to say of the covenant and what it might mean: "...in your role as an architect, you would think about your role as kaitiaki, as a guardian of the places we're making, and there would probably be an automatically [sic] shift, regardless of budget and client."

Governance of the Institute is undertaken by the NZIA Council, led by an elected president, which meets four times a year.

Current Te Kāhui Whaihanga New Zealand Institute of Architects Board:

- President: James Blackburne
- Auckland board member: Michael Thomson
- Gisborne & Hawke's Bay board member: Chris Ainsworth
- Waikato & Bay of Plenty board member: Evan Mayo
- Western board member: Elinor Harvey McDouall
- Wellington board member: Julie Stewart
- Nelson & Marlborough board member: Magdalena Garbarczyk
- Canterbury board member: William Fulton
- Southern board member: Tim Ross
- Co-opted Emerge representative: Charlotte Dunning
- Co-opted Ngā Aho representative: Samantha McGavock.

Past presidents include Pip Cheshire (2014-2016), Judith Taylor (2022–2024) and Judi Keith-Brown (2020–2022).

== New Zealand Architecture Awards ==
The NZIA grants annual architectural awards for various categories of architecture.

The Institute's 'named awards' are conferred in categories of public, commercial, educational and residential architecture. These are named for the influential New Zealand architects Sir Ian Athfield, Sir Miles Warren, John Scott and Ted McCoy, and were first awarded in 2015/16.

In 2022, the Institute introduced the John Sutherland Practice Award to honour individuals, groups, or collectives for their influence and impact on architecture. The award recognises wider architectural endeavours such as professional practice, advocacy, research, and building science. The award is named after Distinguished Fellow John Sutherland, in recognition of his influence on the architectural profession.

The president of the NZIA can also elect to give a certain number of President's Awards each year to those who have made a significant contribution to architecture: these can be awarded to non-architects as well as architects.

Since 2015, the Warren Trust Awards for Architectural Writing have been awarded by the Institute for inventive and meaningful architectural writing. The awards are categorised by age: Tamariki (0-13 years), Rangatahi (14-18 years), and Open (18+ years). The awards are a joint venture with The Warren Trust, a charitable organisation in honour of Sir Miles Warren.

The awards have multiple categories: commercial architecture, education, enduring architecture, heritage, hospitality, housing, housing – alterations and additions, housing – multi unit, planning & urban design, public architecture, small project, architecture.

In 2023, the F. Gordon Wilson Fellowship was established by the Institute to facilitate research of housing issues and creative solutions to affordable housing. The fellowship is awarded annually and is named after F. Gordon Wilson in recognition of his role in shaping state housing in New Zealand. The 2026 fellowship was awarded to Spacecraft Architects.

== Gold Medal ==
The most prestigious honour in New Zealand architecture is the Gold Medal, which is conferred on an individual or group for their outstanding contribution to the practice of architecture, demonstrated through the production of a consistently high-quality body of work over a period of time.

== Distinguished Fellows ==
The Institute honours up to 10 living Distinguished Fellows, who are recognised as being an exceptional influence on or contributor to architecture in New Zealand. As of 2025, the distinguished fellows are Nick Bevin, Barry Dacombe, Richard Harris, Lindley Naismith, Maurice Mahoney, Anne Salmond, Graeme Scott, Julie Stout, John Sutherland, and Christina van Bohemen.

== Fellows (FNZIA) ==
The New Zealand Institute of Architects recognises and honours architects, academics or retired architects who have "achieved a high standing in the profession" or "given meritorious service to the profession or institute".

Nancy Northcroft is the first known woman to have received this honour, in 1966. Other women who have received fellows honours include Lillian Chrystall, Claire Chambers and Ellen Brinkman.

== See also ==
- Architecture of New Zealand
