= 2019–20 in New Zealand association football =

129th competitive association football season in New Zealand

Football in New Zealand
- Season: 2019–20

Men's football
- NZFC Premiership: Auckland City
- NZFC Championship: Auckland City (Note: Due to the COVID-19 pandemic, the 2019–20 season was concluded after 16 rounds. The remaining two rounds of the regular season and the finals series were cancelled. Auckland City, who were leading the regular season table, were declared champions and also awarded the Minor Premiership.)
- NRFL Premier League: North Shore United
- Central Premier League: Western Suburbs
- Mainland Premier League: Cashmere Technical
- FootballSouth Premier League: Mosgiel
- Southern Football League: Nelson Suburbs
- Chatham Cup: Napier City Rovers
- Charity Cup: Auckland City

Women's football
- Women's Premiership: Canterbury United Pride
- Kate Sheppard Cup: Eastern Suburbs

The 2019–20 season was the 129th to the 130th competitive association football season in New Zealand.

== National teams ==
=== New Zealand men's national football team ===
==== Friendlies ====
| 14 November 2019 Friendly | Republic of Ireland | 3–1 | New Zealand | Dublin, Ireland |
| 19:45 UTC+0 | Williams 45'; Maguire 52'; Robinson 75' | Report | McCowatt 30' | Stadium: Aviva Stadium; Attendance: 18,728 |

=== New Zealand women's national football team ===
==== Friendlies ====
| 11 April 2020 MS&AD Cup 2020 | Japan | Cancelled | New Zealand | Sendai, Japan |
| 15:00 UTC+9 | | Cancellation | | Stadium: Yurtec Stadium |

==== 2019 Yongchuan International Tournament ====
| 7 November 2019 Semi-final | China | 2–0 | New Zealand | Chongqing, China |
| 19:35 UTC+8 | Wang Shuang 61', 90+3' | Report | | Stadium: Yongchuan Sports Center; Referee: Law Bik Chi (Hong Kong) |

| 10 November 2019 Third-place playoff | Canada | 3–0 | New Zealand | Chongqing, China |
| 16:00 UTC+8 | Sinclair 35'; Beckie 64', 67' | Report | | Stadium: Yongchuan Sports Center |

==== 2020 Algarve Cup ====
| 4 March 2020 Qualification | New Zealand | 1–1 (7–6 p) | Belgium | Parchal, Portugal |
| 18:00 UTC+9 | Chance 37' | Report | Velde 89' | Stadium: Bela Vista Municipal Stadium |
| | Penalties |
| | Bowen (penalty scored); Gregorius (penalty scored); Stott (penalty scored); White (penalty scored); Moore (penalty scored); Bott (penalty missed); Longo (penalty scored); Cleverley (penalty scored) | | (penalty scored) De Caigny; (penalty scored) Vanhaevermaet; (penalty scored) Cayman; (penalty scored) Evrard; (penalty scored) Wullaert; (penalty missed) Deloose; (penalty scored) De Neve; (penalty missed) Wijnants |

| 7 March 2020 Semi-finals | Italy | 3–0 | New Zealand | Parchal, Portugal |
| 21:00 UTC+9 | Girelli 20'; Bonansea 56'; Bartoli 68' | Report | | Stadium: Vista Municipal Stadium; Referee: Ivana Martinčić (Croatia) |

| 10 March 2020 Third-place game | New Zealand | 1–2 | Norway | Faro/Loulé, Portugal |
| 16:00 UTC+9 | Wilkinson 11' | Report | Jensen 15'; Graham Hansen 86' | Stadium: Estádio Algarve |

=== New Zealand national under-23 football team ===
==== 2019 OFC Men's Olympic Qualifying Tournament ====
===== Group A =====
| Pos | Team | Pld | W | D | L | GF | GA | GD | Pts | Qualification |
|---|---|---|---|---|---|---|---|---|---|---|
| 1 | New Zealand | 3 | 3 | 0 | 0 | 22 | 3 | +19 | 9 | Knockout stage |
| 2 | Solomon Islands | 3 | 2 | 0 | 1 | 13 | 4 | +9 | 6 | Knockout stage |
| 3 | Samoa | 3 | 1 | 0 | 2 | 6 | 11 | −5 | 3 | |
| 4 | American Samoa | 3 | 0 | 0 | 3 | 0 | 23 | −23 | 0 | |

Source: OFC

| 21 September 2019 | Samoa | 1–6 | New Zealand | Suva, Fiji |
| 15:00 | Tumua Leo 41' | Report | Waine 10', 52', 80', 84' (pen.); Rogerson 11'; Bevan 39' | Stadium: ANZ National Stadium; Attendance: 240; Referee: Norbert Hauata (Tahiti) |

| 24 September 2019 | New Zealand | 12–0 | American Samoa | Suva, Fiji |
| 15:00 | Lewis 4', 34'; Rogerson 15'; Whyte 19'; Bevan 51', 75', 78', 83', 89'; Waine 54', 59'; De Jong 56' | Report | | Stadium: ANZ National Stadium; Attendance: 200; Referee: David Yareboinen (Papua New Guinea) |

| 27 September 2019 | New Zealand | 4–2 | Solomon Islands | Suva, Fiji |
| 18:00 | Lewis 37'; Bevan 39', 90+1'; Billingsley 53' | Report | Taroga 1'; Maeobia 78' | Stadium: ANZ National Stadium; Attendance: 600; Referee: Mederic Lacour (New Caledonia) |

===== Knockout stage =====
| 2 October 2019 Semi-final | New Zealand | 6–1 | Fiji | Lautoka, Fiji |
| 12:00 | Wara 13' (o.g.); Waine 23'; Rogerson 28'; Bevan 44', 90+5'; Elliot 78' | Report | Shah 73' | Stadium: Churchill Park; Attendance: 150; Referee: David Yareboinen (Papua New Guinea) |

| 5 October 2019 Final | New Zealand | 5–0 | Solomon Islands | Lautoka, Fiji |
| 15:00 | Rogerson 7'; Bevan 27', 67'; Waine 30'; Jones 90' | Report | | Stadium: Churchill Park; Attendance: 200; Referee: Norbert Hauata (Tahiti) |

=== New Zealand women's national under-20 football team ===
==== 2019 OFC U-19 Women's Championship ====
===== Group B =====
| Pos | Team | Pld | W | D | L | GF | GA | GD | Pts | Qualification |
|---|---|---|---|---|---|---|---|---|---|---|
| 1 | New Zealand | 3 | 3 | 0 | 0 | 47 | 0 | +47 | 9 | Knockout stage |
| 2 | Tahiti | 3 | 2 | 0 | 1 | 17 | 5 | +12 | 6 | Knockout stage |
| 3 | American Samoa | 3 | 1 | 0 | 2 | 3 | 21 | −18 | 3 | |
| 4 | Samoa | 3 | 0 | 0 | 3 | 2 | 43 | −41 | 0 | |

Source: OFC

| 31 August 2019 | New Zealand | 30–0 | Samoa | Rarotonga, Cook Islands |
| 13:00 | Brown 1', 10', 12' (pen.), 16', 49', 58', 61', 71', 85', 86', 90+1'; Wasi 18', 45', 70'; Rennie 22', 36', 38'; Jenkins 37', 43', 53', 68', 80'; Wisnewski 56'; Abbott 65', 82'; Maynard 74', 76', 78', 88', 90+1' | Report | | Stadium: CIFA Academy Field; Attendance: 250; Referee: Tapaita Lelenga (Tonga) |

| 3 September 2019 | Tahiti | 0–5 | New Zealand | Rarotonga, Cook Islands |
| 13:00 | | Report | Jenkins 7' (pen.); Brown 11', 15', 45', 70' | Stadium: CIFA Academy Field; Attendance: 350; Referee: Timothy Niu (Solomon Islands) |

| 6 September 2019 | American Samoa | 0–12 | New Zealand | Rarotonga, Cook Islands |
| 16:00 | | Report | Collins 3', 33', 43' (pen.), 56', 60'; Rennie 6', 45'; Wasi 17'; Kapisi 25' (o.g.); Herman-Watt 38'; Maynard 74'; Wilford Carroll 89' | Stadium: CIFA Academy Field; Attendance: 120; Referee: Tapaita Lelenga (Tonga) |

===== Knockout stage =====
| 9 September 2019 Semi-final | Vanuatu | 0–11 | New Zealand | Rarotonga, Cook Islands |
| 16:00 | | Report | Brown 5', 9', 26', 57', 72'; Rennie 20'; Jenkins 38'; Collins 53'; Wisnewski 68', 89'; Wall 77' | Stadium: CIFA Academy Field; Attendance: 110; Referee: Rani Perry (Tahiti) |

| 12 September 2019 Final | New Caledonia | 2–5 | New Zealand | Rarotonga, Cook Islands |
| 16:00 | Cawa 45'; Pahoa 86' | Report | Rennie 17', 67'; Mittendorff 30'; Jenkins 72'; Brown 75' | Stadium: CIFA Academy Field; Attendance: 400; Referee: Fina Angelo (Vanuatu) |

=== New Zealand national under-17 football team ===
==== 2019 FIFA U-17 World Cup ====
===== Group A =====
| Pos | Team | Pld | W | D | L | GF | GA | GD | Pts | Qualification |
|---|---|---|---|---|---|---|---|---|---|---|
| 1 | Brazil (H) | 3 | 3 | 0 | 0 | 9 | 1 | +8 | 9 | Advance to knockout stage |
| 2 | Angola | 3 | 2 | 0 | 1 | 4 | 4 | 0 | 6 | Advance to knockout stage |
| 3 | New Zealand | 3 | 1 | 0 | 2 | 2 | 5 | −3 | 3 | |
| 4 | Canada | 3 | 0 | 0 | 3 | 2 | 7 | −5 | 0 | |

Source: FIFA
Rules for classification: Group stage tiebreakers
(H) Hosts

| 26 October 2019 | New Zealand | 1–2 | Angola | Estádio Bezerrão, Gama |
| 20:00 | Garbett 54' | Report | Zini 6'; Bark 60' (o.g.) | Attendance: 553; Referee: Ma Ning (China) |

| 29 October 2019 | Brazil | 3–0 | New Zealand | Estádio Bezerrão, Gama |
| 20:00 | Kaio 20'; Talles 81'; Diego 90+1' | Report | | Attendance: 14,158; Referee: Mario Escobar (Guatemala) |

| 1 November 2019 | Canada | 0–1 | New Zealand | Estádio Bezerrão, Gama |
| 20:00 | | Report | Garbett 27' | Attendance: 1,154; Referee: Mario Díaz de Vivar (Paraguay) |

=== New Zealand women's national under-17 football team ===
==== 2020 OFC U-17 Women's Championship ====
On 5 June 2020, the OFC announced that the tournament would be cancelled.

===== Group B =====
| Pos | Team | Pld | W | D | L | GF | GA | GD | Pts | Qualification |
|---|---|---|---|---|---|---|---|---|---|---|
| 1 | New Zealand | 0 | 0 | 0 | 0 | 0 | 0 | 0 | 0 | Knockout stage |
| 2 | Tahiti | 0 | 0 | 0 | 0 | 0 | 0 | 0 | 0 | |
| 3 | Vanuatu | 0 | 0 | 0 | 0 | 0 | 0 | 0 | 0 | |

Source: OFC

| Tahiti | Cancelled | New Zealand | Stade Pater, Pirae |
| | Report |

| New Zealand | Cancelled | Vanuatu | Stade Pater, Pirae |
| | Report |

== OFC Competitions ==
=== OFC Champions League ===
==== Group stage ====
===== Group A =====
| Pos | Team | Pld | W | D | L | GF | GA | GD | Pts | Qualification |
|---|---|---|---|---|---|---|---|---|---|---|
| 1 | (New Zealand) Eastern Suburbs | 3 | 2 | 1 | 0 | 8 | 3 | +5 | 7 | Knockout stage |
| 2 | (Vanuatu) Galaxy | 3 | 1 | 1 | 1 | 7 | 5 | +2 | 4 | Knockout stage |
| 3 | (Papua New Guinea) Hekari United (H) | 3 | 1 | 1 | 1 | 5 | 5 | 0 | 4 | |
| 4 | (New Caledonia) Hienghène Sport | 3 | 0 | 1 | 2 | 3 | 10 | −7 | 1 | |

Source: OFC
(H) Hosts

| 16 February 2020 | Eastern Suburbs (New Zealand) | 2–1 | (Papua New Guinea) Hekari United | Port Moresby, Papua New Guinea |
| 15:00 | Bueno 19', 45+2' | Report | K. Kepo 44' | Stadium: Sir John Guise Stadium; Attendance: 1,500; Referee: Veer Singh (Fiji) |

| 19 February 2020 | Galaxy (Vanuatu) | 2–2 | (New Zealand) Eastern Suburbs | Port Moresby, Papua New Guinea |
| 12:00 | Carter 16'; Roberson 21' | Report | Bueno 43' (pen.), 90+2' | Stadium: Sir John Guise Stadium; Attendance: 100; Referee: Timothy Niu (Solomon Islands) |

| 22 February 2020 | Hienghène Sport (New Caledonia) | 0–4 | (New Zealand) Eastern Suburbs | Port Moresby, Papua New Guinea |
| 12:00 | | Report | Bueno 11', 72'; Drake 17'; Thurston 90+5' | Stadium: Sir John Guise Stadium; Attendance: 300; Referee: Ben Aukwai (Solomon Islands) |

===== Group D =====
| Pos | Team | Pld | W | D | L | GF | GA | GD | Pts | Qualification |
|---|---|---|---|---|---|---|---|---|---|---|
| 1 | (New Zealand) Auckland City | 3 | 3 | 0 | 0 | 9 | 0 | +9 | 9 | Knockout stage |
| 2 | (French Polynesia) Vénus (H) | 3 | 2 | 0 | 1 | 10 | 3 | +7 | 6 | Knockout stage |
| 3 | (Samoa) Lupe o le Soaga | 3 | 1 | 0 | 2 | 4 | 11 | −7 | 3 | |
| 4 | (Fiji) Ba | 3 | 0 | 0 | 3 | 5 | 14 | −9 | 0 | |

Source: OFC
(H) Hosts

| 1 March 2020 | Ba (Fiji) | 0–6 | (New Zealand) Auckland City | Pirae, Tahiti |
| 17:00 | | Report | Vale 30'; Tade 39', 45+1'; Rogerson 58'; Bevan 72'; Kaltak 84' | Stadium: Stade Pater; Attendance: 350; Referee: Médéric Lacour (New Caledonia) |

| 4 March 2020 | Vénus (French Polynesia) | 0–1 | (New Zealand) Auckland City | Mahina, Tahiti |
| 20:00 | | Report | Bevan 42' | Stadium: Stade Municipal de Mahina; Attendance: 1,500; Referee: David Yareboinen (Papua New Guinea) |

| 7 March 2020 | Auckland City (New Zealand) | 2–0 | (Samoa) Lupe o le Soaga | Mahina, Tahiti |
| 17:00 | Kaltak 30'; Manickum 68' | Report | | Stadium: Stade Municipal de Mahina; Attendance: 250; Referee: George Time (Solomon Islands) |

== Men's football ==
=== NZFC ===
| Pos | Team | Pld | W | D | L | GF | GA | GD | Pts | Qualification |
|---|---|---|---|---|---|---|---|---|---|---|
| 1 | Auckland City (C) | 16 | 11 | 4 | 1 | 42 | 15 | +27 | 37 | Qualification to OFC Champions League group stage |
| 2 | Team Wellington | 16 | 10 | 4 | 2 | 36 | 15 | +21 | 34 | Qualification to OFC Champions League group stage |
| 3 | Waitakere United | 16 | 8 | 3 | 5 | 35 | 32 | +3 | 27 | |
| 4 | Eastern Suburbs | 16 | 6 | 4 | 6 | 33 | 26 | +7 | 22 | |
| 5 | Tasman United | 16 | 6 | 2 | 8 | 27 | 26 | +1 | 20 | Disbanded at end of season |
| 6 | Hamilton Wanderers | 16 | 6 | 2 | 8 | 24 | 39 | −15 | 20 | |
| 7 | Southern United | 16 | 5 | 4 | 7 | 25 | 38 | −13 | 19 | Disbanded at end of season |
| 8 | Wellington Phoenix Reserves | 16 | 4 | 6 | 6 | 30 | 32 | −2 | 18 | |
| 9 | Hawke's Bay United | 16 | 4 | 3 | 9 | 32 | 44 | −12 | 15 | |
| 10 | Canterbury United | 16 | 2 | 4 | 10 | 19 | 36 | −17 | 10 | |

Source: NZ Football
(C) Champions

==== Grand final ====
19 April 2020
Sunday, 16:35 NZDT

| Winner SF1 | Cancelled | Winner SF2 |

North Harbour Stadium, Auckland

=== 2019 NRFL Premier League ===
| Pos | Team | Pld | W | D | L | GF | GA | GD | Pts | Qualification |
|---|---|---|---|---|---|---|---|---|---|---|
| 1 | North Shore United (C) | 22 | 14 | 3 | 5 | 47 | 27 | +20 | 45 | |
| 2 | Onehunga Sports | 22 | 13 | 5 | 4 | 54 | 33 | +21 | 44 | |
| 3 | Birkenhead United | 22 | 11 | 3 | 8 | 41 | 32 | +9 | 36 | |
| 4 | Western Springs | 22 | 11 | 3 | 8 | 38 | 36 | +2 | 36 | |
| 5 | Melville United | 22 | 11 | 2 | 9 | 45 | 29 | +16 | 35 | |
| 6 | Central United | 22 | 10 | 2 | 10 | 38 | 32 | +6 | 32 | |
| 7 | Manukau United | 22 | 9 | 5 | 8 | 42 | 42 | 0 | 32 | |
| 8 | Hamilton Wanderers Reserves | 22 | 10 | 2 | 10 | 41 | 45 | −4 | 32 | |
| 9 | Eastern Suburbs Reserves | 22 | 9 | 3 | 10 | 40 | 44 | −4 | 30 | |
| 10 | Waitakere City | 22 | 8 | 2 | 12 | 33 | 46 | −13 | 22 (Note: Waitakere City were deducted 4 points for incorrect coaching license.) | |
| 11 | Glenfield Rovers (R) | 22 | 5 | 2 | 15 | 32 | 49 | −17 | 15 (Note: Glenfield Rovers were deducted 2 points for incorrect coaching license.) | Relegation to NRFL Division 1 |
| 12 | East Coast Bays (R) | 22 | 4 | 2 | 16 | 27 | 63 | −36 | 14 | Relegation to NRFL Division 1 |

(C) Champions; (R) Relegated

=== 2019 Central Premier League ===
| Pos | Team | Pld | W | D | L | GF | GA | GD | Pts | Qualification |
|---|---|---|---|---|---|---|---|---|---|---|
| 1 | Western Suburbs (C) | 18 | 13 | 3 | 2 | 58 | 18 | +40 | 42 | |
| 2 | Napier City Rovers | 18 | 12 | 1 | 5 | 57 | 30 | +27 | 37 | |
| 3 | Miramar Rangers | 18 | 11 | 2 | 5 | 69 | 29 | +40 | 35 | |
| 4 | North Wellington | 18 | 10 | 4 | 4 | 63 | 34 | +29 | 34 | |
| 5 | Wellington Olympic | 18 | 11 | 0 | 7 | 60 | 32 | +28 | 33 | |
| 6 | Lower Hutt City | 18 | 9 | 0 | 9 | 49 | 40 | +9 | 27 | |
| 7 | Stop Out | 18 | 8 | 2 | 8 | 55 | 39 | +16 | 26 | |
| 8 | Waterside Karori | 18 | 6 | 2 | 10 | 34 | 40 | −6 | 20 | |
| 9 | Wairarapa United | 18 | 0 | 3 | 15 | 27 | 88 | −61 | 3 | |
| 10 | Wellington United (R) | 18 | 0 | 3 | 15 | 21 | 143 | −122 | 3 | Relegation to Capital Premier/Central Federation League |

(C) Champions; (R) Relegated

=== 2019 Mainland Premier League ===
| Pos | Team | Pld | W | D | L | GF | GA | GD | Pts | Qualification |
|---|---|---|---|---|---|---|---|---|---|---|
| 1 | Cashmere Technical (C) | 14 | 12 | 1 | 1 | 56 | 12 | +44 | 37 | Champions and qualification to Southern Football League |
| 2 | Nelson Suburbs | 14 | 9 | 1 | 4 | 35 | 18 | +17 | 28 | Qualification to Southern Football League |
| 3 | Nomads United | 14 | 8 | 0 | 6 | 38 | 37 | +1 | 24 | Qualification to Southern Football League |
| 4 | Western | 14 | 6 | 2 | 6 | 25 | 24 | +1 | 20 | Qualification to Southern Football League |
| 5 | Coastal Spirit | 14 | 6 | 1 | 7 | 35 | 23 | +12 | 19 | Qualification to Southern Football League |
| 6 | Ferrymead Bays | 14 | 5 | 2 | 7 | 20 | 33 | −13 | 17 | Qualification to Mainland Premier Qualifying League |
| 7 | Selwyn United | 14 | 5 | 1 | 8 | 31 | 41 | −10 | 16 | Qualification to Mainland Premier Qualifying League |
| 8 | FC Twenty 11 (R) | 14 | 0 | 2 | 12 | 14 | 66 | −52 | 2 | Qualification to Mainland Premier Qualifying League Relegated to Canterbury Championship League |

Source: Fiji Football, Ultimate New Zealand
Rules for classification: 1) Points; 2) Head to head; 3) Disciplinary record (1 Disciplinary Point for Yellow, 3 Disciplinary Points for Red); 4) Coin toss
(C) Champions; (R) Relegated

=== 2019 FootballSouth Premier League ===
| Pos | Team | Pld | W | D | L | GF | GA | GD | Pts | Qualification |
|---|---|---|---|---|---|---|---|---|---|---|
| 1 | Mosgiel | 9 | 7 | 2 | 0 | 27 | 7 | +20 | 23 | Champions and qualification to Southern Football League |
| 2 | Otago University | 9 | 6 | 2 | 1 | 23 | 8 | +15 | 20 | Qualification to Southern Football League |
| 3 | Caversham | 9 | 6 | 0 | 3 | 21 | 15 | +6 | 18 | Qualification to Southern Football League |
| 4 | Roslyn-Wakari | 9 | 5 | 1 | 3 | 27 | 15 | +12 | 16 | Qualification to FootballSouth Championship |
| 5 | Queenstown | 9 | 5 | 1 | 3 | 21 | 18 | +3 | 16 | Qualification to FootballSouth Championship |
| 6 | Dunedin Technical | 9 | 4 | 0 | 5 | 17 | 16 | +1 | 12 | Qualification to FootballSouth Championship |
| 7 | Green Island | 9 | 3 | 0 | 6 | 25 | 22 | +3 | 9 | Qualification to FootballSouth Championship |
| 8 | Southland United (W) | 9 | 3 | 0 | 6 | 16 | 25 | −9 | 9 | Qualification to FootballSouth Championship Withdrew at end of season |
| 9 | Wānaka | 9 | 3 | 0 | 6 | 10 | 23 | −13 | 9 | Qualification to FootballSouth Championship |
| 10 | Northern | 9 | 0 | 0 | 9 | 7 | 45 | −38 | 0 | Qualification to FootballSouth Championship |

Source: Fiji Football, Ultimate New Zealand
Rules for classification: 1) Points; 2) Goal difference; 3) Goals scored; 4) Goals against; 5) Head to head; 6) Disciplinary record; 7) Coin toss
(W) Withdrew

==== Championship round ====
| Pos | Team | Pld | W | D | L | GF | GA | GD | Pts |
|---|---|---|---|---|---|---|---|---|---|
| 1 | Green Island (C) | 12 | 9 | 0 | 3 | 51 | 24 | +27 | 27 |
| 2 | Roslyn-Wakari | 12 | 8 | 1 | 3 | 43 | 19 | +24 | 25 |
| 3 | Wanaka | 12 | 6 | 4 | 2 | 31 | 21 | +10 | 22 |
| 4 | Dunedin Technical | 12 | 7 | 1 | 4 | 26 | 25 | +1 | 22 |
| 5 | Queenstown | 12 | 5 | 1 | 6 | 28 | 29 | −1 | 16 |
| 6 | Southland United | 12 | 3 | 1 | 8 | 19 | 40 | −21 | 10 |
| 7 | Northern | 12 | 0 | 0 | 12 | 18 | 58 | −40 | 0 |

Rules for classification: 1) Points; 2) Goal difference; 3) Goals scored; 4) Goals against; 5) Head to head; 6) Disciplinary record; 7) Coin toss
(C) Champions

=== 2019 Southern Football League ===
| Pos | Team | Pld | W | D | L | GF | GA | GD | Pts | Qualification |
|---|---|---|---|---|---|---|---|---|---|---|
| 1 | Nelson Suburbs | 7 | 5 | 2 | 0 | 17 | 5 | +12 | 17 | Winner of Southern Football League |
| 2 | Cashmere Technical | 7 | 5 | 1 | 1 | 24 | 7 | +17 | 16 | |
| 3 | Coastal Spirit | 7 | 4 | 1 | 2 | 19 | 12 | +7 | 13 | |
| 4 | Caversham | 7 | 3 | 2 | 2 | 14 | 10 | +4 | 11 | |
| 5 | Mosgiel | 7 | 2 | 1 | 4 | 12 | 16 | −4 | 7 | |
| 6 | Nomads United | 7 | 2 | 1 | 4 | 15 | 19 | −4 | 7 | |
| 7 | Western | 7 | 2 | 1 | 4 | 10 | 20 | −10 | 7 | |
| 8 | Otago University | 7 | 0 | 1 | 6 | 9 | 31 | −22 | 1 | |

Source: Fiji Football, Ultimate New Zealand
Rules for classification: 1) Points; 2) Goal difference; 3) Goals scored; 4) Goals against; 5) Head to head; 6) Disciplinary record; 7) Coin toss

=== Cup competitions ===
==== Chatham Cup ====
===== Final =====
8 September 2019
15:00

| Melville United | 2–3 | Napier City Rovers |
|---|---|---|
| Marquez 12'; Scott 86' | Report | McNamara 82'; Schofield 85'; Goto 89' |

North Harbour Stadium, Auckland
Referee: Antony Riley

==== Charity Cup ====
This match also doubled as a NZFC match.

15 March 2020
16:00 NZST

| Eastern Suburbs | 0–2 | Auckland City |
|---|---|---|
| | Report | Kaltak 60'; Bevan 89' |

Madills Farm, Auckland
Referee: Campbell-Kirk Kawana-Waugh

== Women's football ==
=== Women's Premiership ===
| Pos | Team | Pld | W | D | L | GF | GA | GD | Pts | Qualification |
|---|---|---|---|---|---|---|---|---|---|---|
| 1 | Canterbury United Pride (C) | 12 | 10 | 1 | 1 | 36 | 8 | +28 | 31 | Qualification to the Final |
| 2 | Northern Lights | 12 | 7 | 5 | 0 | 28 | 8 | +20 | 26 | Qualification to the Final |
| 3 | Auckland | 12 | 6 | 4 | 2 | 20 | 13 | +7 | 22 | |
| 4 | Southern United | 12 | 6 | 2 | 4 | 27 | 20 | +7 | 20 | |
| 5 | Capital | 12 | 3 | 2 | 7 | 24 | 28 | −4 | 11 | |
| 6 | WaiBOP | 12 | 2 | 1 | 9 | 6 | 33 | −27 | 7 | |
| 7 | Central Football | 12 | 0 | 1 | 11 | 9 | 40 | −31 | 1 | |

Source: The Ultimate New Zealand Soccer Website
Rules for classification: 1) points; 2) goal difference; 3) number of goals scored.
(C) Champions

==== Grand final ====
15 December 2019
14:00

| Canterbury United Pride | 1–1 (a.e.t.) | Northern Lights |
|---|---|---|
| Dominikovich 56' | Report | Brown 64' |
Penalties
| Lake (penalty scored); van Noorden (penalty scored); Dabner (penalty scored); Nicholson (penalty scored) | 4–2 | (penalty scored) Savage; (penalty missed) Knott; (penalty scored) Jenkins; (penalty missed) Brown |

English Park, Christchurch
Referee: Anna-Marie Keighley

=== Kate Sheppard Cup ===
==== Final ====
8 September 2019
12:00

| Coastal Spirit | 0–4 | Eastern Suburbs |
|---|---|---|
| | Report | Pilley 4', 25'; O’Brien 9', 35' |

North Harbour Stadium, Auckland
