= 2019 Southern Football League (New Zealand) =

Southern Football League
- Season: 2019
- Dates: 22 June - 1 September
- Champions: Nelson Suburbs
- Matches: 28
- Goals: 120 (4.29 per match)
- Top goalscorer: Cameron Gordon (7 goals)
- Biggest home win: Nomads United 5–0 Western (11 August 2019)
- Biggest away win: Otago University 1–9 Coastal Spirit (11 August 2019)
- Highest scoring: Otago University 1–9 Coastal Spirit (11 August 2019)
- Longest winning run: 4 matches Nelson Suburbs
- Longest unbeaten run: 7 matches Nelson Suburbs
- Longest winless run: 7 matches Otago University
- Longest losing run: 6 matches Otago University

The 2019 Southern Football League was the second season of the second level of men's football in New Zealand's South Island.

Cashmere Technical were the 2018 Southern Football League champions. Cashmere Technical were the 2018 Mainland Premier League champions and Dunedin Technical were the 2018 FootballSouth Premier League champions.

== Qualifying Leagues ==
=== Mainland Premier League ===
Mainland Premier League
- Season: 2019
- Dates: 9 March - 22 June
- Champions: Cashmere Technical
- Matches: 56
- Goals: 254 (4.54 per match)
- Top goalscorer: Garbhan Coughlan (18 goals)
- Biggest home win: Coastal Spirit 10–1 FC Twenty 11 (22 June 2019)
- Biggest away win: FC Twenty 11 0–6 Cashmere Technical (25 May 2019)
- Highest scoring: Coastal Spirit 10–1 FC Twenty 11 (22 June 2019)

The 2019 Mainland Premier League was the 18th season of the league, the 22nd season of premiership football in the upper South Island. The shortened season started on 9 March, and finished on 22 June, being a double round. The league was to determine the top five teams in Mainland's federation, who go on to play the top three teams from FootballSouth. The bottom three will play in the teams with the teams in Canterbury Championship League to form a qualifying league for next season, starting after this league finishes.

==== Mainland Premier League teams ====
Eight team are competing in this league - seven from the previous season and one promoted team. The promoted team is Western, who replaced Canterbury Universities after five seasons. This is Western's 21st season in the league.

Team	Home ground	Location	2018 season
Cashmere Technical	Garrick Memorial Park	Woolston, Christchurch	1st in Premier; 1st in Southern Football League
Coastal Spirit	English Park	St Albans, Christchurch	2nd in Premier; 6th in Southern Football League
FC Twenty 11	Avonhead Park	Avonhead, Christchurch	6th in Premier
Ferrymead Bays	Ferrymead Park	Ferrymead, Christchurch	3rd in Premier; 3rd in Southern Football League
Nelson Suburbs	Saxton Field	Stoke, Nelson	4th in Premier; 4th in Southern Football League
Nomads United	Tullet Park	Casebrook, Christchurch	5th in Premier; 2nd in Southern Football League
Selwyn United	Foster Park	Rollerston, Canterbury	7th in Premier
Western	Walter Park	Mairehau, Christchurch	1st in Canterbury Championship League (promoted)

==== Mainland Premier League personnel ====
Team	Manager	Captain
Cashmere Technical	(New Zealand) Deane Hutchinson	(England) Tom Schwarz
Coastal Spirit	(New Zealand) Ekow Quainoo	(New Zealand) Anthony Jones
FC Twenty 11	(New Zealand) Robert Barraclough	(New Zealand) Callum Smith
Ferrymead Bays	(New Zealand) Joe Hall	(Republic of Ireland) James Deehan
Nelson Suburbs	(England) Steve Bignall	(New Zealand) Sam Ayers
Nomads United	(Wales) Andrew Pitman	(New Zealand) Jacob Anderson
Selwyn United	(New Zealand) Christopher Brown	
Western	(New Zealand) Robbie Stanton	(New Zealand) Fraser Angus

==== Mainland Premier League table ====
Pos	Team	Pld	W	D	L	GF	GA	GD	Pts	Qualification
1	Cashmere Technical (C)	14	12	1	1	56	12	+44	37	Champions and qualification to Southern Football League
2	Nelson Suburbs	14	9	1	4	35	18	+17	28	Qualification to Southern Football League
3	Nomads United	14	8	0	6	38	37	+1	24	Qualification to Southern Football League
4	Western	14	6	2	6	25	24	+1	20	Qualification to Southern Football League
5	Coastal Spirit	14	6	1	7	35	23	+12	19	Qualification to Southern Football League
6	Ferrymead Bays	14	5	2	7	20	33	−13	17	Qualification to Mainland Premier Qualifying League
7	Selwyn United	14	5	1	8	31	41	−10	16	Qualification to Mainland Premier Qualifying League
8	FC Twenty 11 (R)	14	0	2	12	14	66	−52	2	Qualification to Mainland Premier Qualifying League Relegated to Canterbury Championship League

Source: Fiji Football, Ultimate New Zealand
Rules for classification: 1) Points; 2) Head to head; 3) Disciplinary record (1 Disciplinary Point for Yellow, 3 Disciplinary Points for Red); 4) Coin toss
(C) Champions; (R) Relegated

==== Mainland Premier League results table ====
Home \ Away	CT	CS	FC	FB	NS	NU	SU	WS
Cashmere Technical		4–2	5–0	6–0	4–1	7–0	6–3	2–0
Coastal Spirit	0–2		10–1	0–0	1–3	3–0	1–3	4–1
FC Twenty 11	0–6	0–4		2–3	2–4	1–6	1–6	0–3
Ferrymead Bays	2–1	1–6	2–2		0–3	2–4	3–1	2–0
Nelson Suburbs	0–2	0–1	3–0	2–0		4–2	4–1	0–0
Nomads United	0–5	2–0	6–1	3–0	5–4		4–0	1–3
Selwyn United	0–2	3–2	3–3	1–3	0–4	6–4		1–3
Western	4–4	2–1	5–1	2–1	0–3	2–0	1–3	

Source: Fiji Football, Ultimate New Zealand
Legend: Blue = home team win; Yellow = draw; Red = away team win.

==== Mainland Premier League Playoff Series ====
The Mainland Premier League Playoff Series was a two-legged match that took place between the Canterbury Championship's winners and Nelson Bays Premiership's winners. The winners of the Canterbury Premiership League was Christchurch United, who faced the Nelson Bays Premiership winners, FC Nelson. The winner of the Mainland Premier League promotion play-off will play in the 2020 Mainland Premier League.

Overview

Team 1	Agg.	Team 2	1st leg	2nd leg
Christchurch United (C)	9–2	FC Nelson (N)	2-3	6-0

Matches – Mainland Premier League Playoff Series

14 September 2019	FC Nelson	2 – 3	Christchurch United	The Wood, Nelson
1:30 pm	Pan 72'; Bowman 74' (o.g.)	Report	White 5'; McnIntyre 35', 45'	Stadium: Guppy Park; Referee: Richard Malcolm

21 September 2019	Christchurch United	6 – 0	FC Nelson	Spreydon, Christchurch
4:30 pm	McnIntyre 22', 29', 51'; White 43'; Koyama 64'; Peers 88'	Report		Stadium: United Sports Centre; Referee: Ben O'Connell

==== Mainland Premier League top scorers ====
Rank	Player	Club	Goals
1	(Republic of Ireland) Garbhan Coughlan	Cashmere Technical	18
2	(New Zealand) Cameron Gordon	Nelson Suburbs	17
3	(England) Daniel Ede	Selwyn United	10
3	(New Zealand) Ryan Stanley	Western	10
5	(New Zealand) Finbar Gallaway	Cashmere Technical	9
6	(New Zealand) Declan Hickford	Selwyn United	8
6	(New Zealand) Ashley Wellbourn	Coastal Spirit	8
8	(South Africa) Lyle Matthysen	Cashmere Technical	7
9	(New Zealand) Jacob Anderson	Nomads United	6
9	(Fiji) Mika Rabuka	Nomads United	6
9	(England) Andrew Tuckey	Cashmere Technical	6

==== Mainland Premier League hat-tricks ====
Round	Player	For	Against	Home/Away	Result	Date
1	(England) Daniel Ede	Selwyn United	Nomads United	Home	6–4	9 March 2019
5	(New Zealand) Cameron Gordon	Nelson Suburbs	FC Twenty 11	Away	2–4	13 April 2019
5	(Republic of Ireland) Garbhan Coughlan (Note: Player scored five goals)	Cashmere Technical	Nomads United	Home	7–0	13 April 2019
8	(England) Andrew Tuckey	Cashmere Technical	Selwyn United	Home	6–3	4 May 2019
10	(Republic of Ireland) Garbhan Coughlan (Note: Player scored four goals)	Cashmere Technical	FC Twenty 11	Away	0–6	25 May 2019
10	(New Zealand) Cameron Gordon	Nelson Suburbs	Selwyn United	Away	0–4	3 June 2019
12	(Republic of Ireland) Garbhan Coughlan	Cashmere Technical	Nelson Suburbs	Home	4–0	8 June 2019
13	(New Zealand) Caleb Cottom	Nomads United	FC Twenty 11	Home	6–1	15 June 2019
14	(New Zealand) Ashley Wellbourn	Coastal Spirit	FC Twenty 11	Home	10–1	22 June 2019
14	(Republic of Ireland) Garbhan Coughlan	Cashmere Technical	Ferrymead Bays	Home	6–0	22 June 2019

==== Mainland Premier League own goals ====
Round	Player	Club	H/A	Time	Goal	Result	Opponent	Date
1	(New Zealand) Jack Allatt	Selwyn United	Home	78'	5–4	6–4	Nomads United	9 March 2024
3	(New Zealand) Pieter-Taco Bierema	Selwyn United	Home	90'	3–3	3–3	FC Twenty 11	30 March 2024
6	(New Zealand) Cameron Gordon	Nelson Suburbs	Home	30'	0–2	0–2	Cashmere Technical	19 April 2024
6	(New Zealand) Max Collingwood	Nomads United	Away	7'	1–0	3–4	Ferrymead Bays	19 April 2024
6	(New Zealand) Oliver Scholz	Ferrymead Bays	Home	90'	3–4	3–4	Nomads United	19 April 2024
7	(New Zealand) Lochlan McNicholl	FC Twenty 11	Home	9'	0–1	1–6	Nomads United	28 April 2024
10	(New Zealand) William McLuskie	FC Twenty 11	Home	43'	0–2	0–6	Cashmere Technical	25 May 2019
10	(New Zealand) Michael Hogan	Coastal Spirit	Away	90'	2–0	2–0	Nomads United	25 May 2019
10	(New Zealand) Jack Allatt	Selwyn United	Home	31'	0–2	0–4	Nelson Suburbs	3 June 2019

=== FootballSouth Premier League ===
FootballSouth Premier League
- Season: 2019
- Dates: 23 March - 25 May
- Champions: Mosgiel
- Matches: 45
- Goals: 194 (4.31 per match)
- Top goalscorer: Matthew Brazier; Dominic Scahill (8 goals each)
- Biggest home win: Roslyn Wakari 8–1 Southland United (18 May 2019); Otago University 7–0 Northern (27 April 2019); Mosgiel 7–0 Northern (18 May 2019)
- Biggest away win: Northern 1–6 Roslyn Wakari (30 March 2019); Northern 0–6 Dunedin Technical (4 May 2019)
- Highest scoring: Roslyn Wakari 8–1 Southland United (18 May 2019)

The 2019 FootballSouth Premier League was the 20th season of premiership football in the lower South Island. The shortened season started on 23 March, and finished on 25 May, being a single round. The league was to determine the top three teams in FootballSouth's federation, who go on to play the top five teams from Mainland Football. The bottom seven team will play in the in FootballSouth Championship League, starting after this league finishes.

==== FootballSouth Premier League teams ====
Ten teams are competing in the league - nine teams from last year and one promoted team. The promoted team is Wānaka. This is Wānaka's first season in the league.

Team	Home ground	Location	2018 season
Caversham	Tonga Park	South Dunedin, Dunedin	4th in Premier; 3rd in Championship
Dunedin Technical	Tahuna Park	Tahuna, Dunedin	1st in Premier; 7th in Southern Football League
Green Island	Sunnyvale Park	Green Island, Dunedin	7th in Premier; 2nd in Championship
Mosgiel	Mosgiel Memorial Park	Mosgiel	6th in Premier; 4th in Championship
Northern	Forrester Park	Normanby, Dunedin	8th in Premier; 6th in Championship
Otago University	Logan Park	Dunedin North, Dunedin	9th in Premier; 5th in Championship
Queenstown	Queenstown Events Centre	Frankton, Queenstown	2nd in Premier; 5th in Southern Football League
Roslyn Wakari	Ellis Park	Glenross, Dunedin	5th in Premier; 1st in Championship
Southland United	ILT Football Turf	Invercargill	3rd in Premier; 8th in Championship
Wānaka	Wānaka Recreation Centre	Kelly's Flat, Wānaka	(promoted)

==== FootballSouth Premier League personnel ====
Team	Manager	Captain
Caversham	(New Zealand) Richard Murray	(New Zealand) Andrew Ridden
Dunedin Technical	(New Zealand) Phillips Paul	(England) Michael Neaverson
Green Island	(New Zealand) Richard Kerrbell	(New Zealand) Cody Robinson
Mosgiel	(New Zealand) Cameron McPhail	(New Zealand) Rory Findlay
Northern	(Brazil) Luiz Uehara	(New Zealand) Lathim Greig
Otago University	(New Zealand) Darren Hart	(New Zealand) Dominic Scahill
Queenstown	(New Zealand) Jamie Whitmarsh	(New Zealand) Lewis Walters
Roslyn Wakari	(New Zealand) Colin Thom	(New Zealand) Luke Clissold
Southland United	(New Zealand) Greig Evans	(New Zealand) Jack Boland
Wānaka	(New Zealand) Ian Bell	(New Zealand) Blair Scoullar

==== FootballSouth Premier League table ====
Pos	Team	Pld	W	D	L	GF	GA	GD	Pts	Qualification
1	Mosgiel	9	7	2	0	27	7	+20	23	Champions and qualification to Southern Football League
2	Otago University	9	6	2	1	23	8	+15	20	Qualification to Southern Football League
3	Caversham	9	6	0	3	21	15	+6	18	Qualification to Southern Football League
4	Roslyn-Wakari	9	5	1	3	27	15	+12	16	Qualification to FootballSouth Championship
5	Queenstown	9	5	1	3	21	18	+3	16	Qualification to FootballSouth Championship
6	Dunedin Technical	9	4	0	5	17	16	+1	12	Qualification to FootballSouth Championship
7	Green Island	9	3	0	6	25	22	+3	9	Qualification to FootballSouth Championship
8	Southland United (W)	9	3	0	6	16	25	−9	9	Qualification to FootballSouth Championship Withdrew at end of season
9	Wānaka	9	3	0	6	10	23	−13	9	Qualification to FootballSouth Championship
10	Northern	9	0	0	9	7	45	−38	0	Qualification to FootballSouth Championship

Source: Fiji Football, Ultimate New Zealand
Rules for classification: 1) Points; 2) Goal difference; 3) Goals scored; 4) Goals against; 5) Head to head; 6) Disciplinary record; 7) Coin toss
(W) Withdrew

==== FootballSouth Premier League results table ====
Home \ Away	CA	DT	GI	MO	NO	OU	QT	RW	SL	WA
Caversham		3–1					2–0	3–2	5–1	
Dunedin Technical				0–3		0–1	3–2	1–2		
Green Island	6–2	2–3			5–2				4–0	1–2
Mosgiel	1–0		4–2		7–0				1–0	4–1
Northern	2–5	1–6					0–3	1–6		
Otago University	2–0		3–1	1–1	7–0					4–0
Queenstown			4–3	2–2		3–1				4–1
Roslyn-Wakari			2–1	1–4		2–2	1–2		8–1	
Southland United		2–0			4–0	1–2	5–1			2–4
Wānaka	0–1	0–3			2–1			0–3		

Source: Fiji Football, Ultimate New Zealand
Legend: Blue = home team win; Yellow = draw; Red = away team win.

==== FootballSouth Premier League top scorers ====
Rank	Player	Club	Goals
1	(New Zealand) Matthew Brazier	Green Island	8
1	(New Zealand) Dominic Scahill	Otago University	8
3	(New Zealand) Luke Clissold	Roslyn Wakari	7
3	(New Zealand) Carlos Herrmann	Queenstown	7
3	(New Zealand) Benjamin Stanley	Otago University	7
6	(New Zealand) Jan Kumar	Queenstown	6
7	(New Zealand) Riley Anderton	Mosgiel	5
7	(New Zealand) Tennessee Kinghorn	Roslyn Wakari	5
7	(New Zealand) Stephen Pleskun	Wānaka	5
10	(New Zealand) Cameron Anderson	Msogiel	4
10	(New Zealand) Aidan Barbour-Ryan	Msogiel	4
10	(New Zealand) Davi Virgilio de Carvalho Stemler Veiga	Southland United	4
10	(New Zealand) Rhys Quarrell	Dunedin Technical	4
10	(New Zealand) Campbell Thompson	Caversham	4

==== FootballSouth Premier League hat-tricks ====
Round	Player	For	Against	Home/Away	Result	Date
1	(New Zealand) Stephen Pleskun	Wānaka	Southland United	Away	2–4	23 March 2019
6	(New Zealand) Benjamin Stanley	Otago University	Northern	Home	7–0	27 April 2019
8	(New Zealand) Tennessee Kinghorn	Roslyn Wakari	Southland United	Home	8–1	18 May 2019
8	(New Zealand) Riley Anderton	Mosgiel	Northern	Home	7–0	18 May 2019
9	(New Zealand) Matthew Brazier	Green Island	Caversham	Home	6–2	3 June 2019

==== FootballSouth Premier League own-goals ====
Round	Player	Club	H/A	Time	Goal	Result	Opponent	Date
3	(New Zealand) Blair Scoullar	Wānaka	Home	38'	2–1	2–1	Northern	6 April 2019
3	(United States) David Schipper	Southland United	Home	53'	4–1	5–1	Queenstown	6 April 2019
6	(New Zealand) Allan Carmicharl	Wānaka	Away	70'	3–1	4–1	Mosgiel	27 April 2019
6	(New Zealand) Craig Ferguson	Caversham	Home	18'	0–1	3–2	Roslyn Wakari	27 April 2019
6	(New Zealand) Craig Ferguson	Caversham	Home	26'	1–2	3–2	Roslyn Wakari	27 April 2019
7	(New Zealand) David Hayman	Dunedin Technical	Away	30'	1–0	1–1	Northern	4 May 2019
8	(New Zealand) Robbie Columbus	Northern	Away	18'	3–0	7–0	Mosgiel	18 May 2019
8	(New Zealand) Matthew Johnstone	Northern	Away	39'	5–0	7–0	Mosgiel	18 May 2019

== Southern Football League ==
The Southern Football League is the culmination of the two regional leagues, each of which provide teams to the Southern Football League. The top five teams in the Mainland Premier League and top three teams from the FootballSouth Premier League qualify for entry into the Southern Football League.

=== Qualified Teams ===
Association	Team	Position in Regional League	App (last)	Previous best (last)
Mainland Football (5 berths)	Cashmere Technical	1st	2nd (2018)	1st (2018)
Mainland Football (5 berths)	Nelson Suburbs	2nd	2nd (2018)	4th (2018)
Mainland Football (5 berths)	Nomads United	3rd	2nd (2018)	2nd (2018)
Mainland Football (5 berths)	Western	4th	1st	Debut
Mainland Football (5 berths)	Coastal Spirit	5th	2nd (2018)	6th (2018)
FootballSouth (3 berths)	Mosgiel	1st	1st	Debut
FootballSouth (3 berths)	Otago University	2nd	1st	Debut
FootballSouth (3 berths)	Caversham	3rd	1st	Debut

=== Southern Football League table ===
Pos	Team	Pld	W	D	L	GF	GA	GD	Pts	Qualification
1	Nelson Suburbs	7	5	2	0	17	5	+12	17	Winner of Southern Football League
2	Cashmere Technical	7	5	1	1	24	7	+17	16	
3	Coastal Spirit	7	4	1	2	19	12	+7	13	
4	Caversham	7	3	2	2	14	10	+4	11	
5	Mosgiel	7	2	1	4	12	16	−4	7	
6	Nomads United	7	2	1	4	15	19	−4	7	
7	Western	7	2	1	4	10	20	−10	7	
8	Otago University	7	0	1	6	9	31	−22	1	

Source: Fiji Football, Ultimate New Zealand
Rules for classification: 1) Points; 2) Goal difference; 3) Goals scored; 4) Goals against; 5) Head to head; 6) Disciplinary record; 7) Coin toss

=== Southern Football League results table ===
Home \ Away	CV	CT	CS	MO	NS	NU	OU	WS
Caversham		1–1	1–2				6–2	
Cashmere Technical			5–1	4–1	0–1			5–2
Coastal Spirit				1–0	1–1	3–0		
Mosgiel	0–2				1–3	3–3		4–2
Nelson Suburbs	1–1					1–0	5–1	4–2
Nomads United	2–3	1–6					4–3	5–0
Otago University		0–3	1–9	1–3				
Western	2–0		3–1				1–1	

Source: Fiji Football, Ultimate New Zealand
Legend: Blue = home team win; Yellow = draw; Red = away team win.

==== Southern Football League top scorers ====
Rank	Player	Club	Goals
1	(New Zealand) Cameron Gordon	Nelson Suburbs	7
2	(Republic of Ireland) Garbhan Coughlan	Cashmere Technical	6
2	(New Zealand) Declan Hickford	Nomads United	6
4	(New Zealand) Michael Hogan	Coastal Spirit	5
4	(New Zealand) Connor Neil	Caversham	5
6	(New Zealand) Cameron Anderson	Mosgiel	4
6	(New Zealand) Ben Kiore	Caversham	4
6	(South Africa) Lyle Matthysen	Cashmere Technical	4
6	(New Zealand) Dominic Scahill	Otago University	4
6	(New Zealand) Daniel Thoms	Western	4
6	(New Zealand) Luke Tongue	Cashmere Technical	4
6	(New Zealand) Ashley Wellbourn	Coastal Spirit	4

==== Southern Football League hat-tricks ====
Round	Player	For	Against	Home/Away	Result	Date
1	(New Zealand) Ashley Wellbourn	Coastal Spirit	Nomads United	Home	3–0	29 June 2019
2	(Republic of Ireland) Garbhan Coughlan	Cashmere Technical	Western	Home	5–2	14 July 2019
4	(New Zealand) Cameron Gordon	Nelson Suburbs	Mosgiel	Away	1–3	27 July 2019
4	(New Zealand) Ben Kiore	Caversham	Otago University	Home	6–2	28 July 2019
5	(New Zealand) Declan Hickford	Nomads United	Western	Home	5–0	11 August 2019
5	(New Zealand) Michael Hogan	Coastal Spirit	Otago University	Away	1–9	11 August 2019
7	(New Zealand) Cameron Anderson	Mosgiel	Nomads United	Home	3–3	25 August 2019
