= 1962 Chatham Cup =

Tournament details
- Venue(s): Basin Reserve, Wellington
- Dates: 9 June – 1 September 1962

Final positions
- Champions: Hamilton Technical Old Boys (1st title)
- Runners-up: Northern

The 1962 Chatham Cup was the 35th annual nationwide knockout football competition in New Zealand.

The competition was run on a regional basis, with regional associations each holding separate qualifying rounds. Other teams known to have taken part in the final rounds included North Shore United, Blockhouse Bay, Eastern Suburbs, Mt Wellington (Auckland) Kahukura (Rotorua), Whakatane Town, Riverina (Gisborne), Hastings City, Wanganui Athletic, St. Andrews (Manawatu), Moturoa AFC (New Plymouth), Seatoun AFC, Northern (Wellington), Nelson Rangers, Western AFC (Christchurch), Northern, Timaru Thistle, Invercargill Thistle.

== The 1962 final ==
Hamilton Technical Old Boys, captained by Arthur Leong, became the first team from outside the four main centres to win the cup. Technical Old Boys road to the 1962 final saw wins against Huntly Thistle 2 - 1, Whakatane Town 11 - 2, Kahukura Crusaders 8 - 1, North Shore United 4 - 2 and Moturoa 4 - 0.

The Northern side contained three brothers - George, John, and Phillip Little. Northern goalkeeper Jim Stephenson became the first person to play in six Chatham Cup finals, a feat which was to eventually be surpassed by Tony Sibley in 1982.

The match is regarded as the best final of the 1960s - and one of the best finals ever. George Little opened the scoring for Northern after just four minutes adding to goals he had scored in the 1958 and 1961 finals, but Paul Nevison equalised within seconds. The Hamilton side were 2-1 up after just seven minutes, with a goal by Trevor Jones. Jones added a second in the 37th minute, and the scoring was completed by a second Nevison strike seven minutes into the second period.

== Results ==
=== Second round ===
26 May 1962

Moturoa	5 - 1	New Plymouth Old Boys

Western Park, New Plymouth
4 June 1962

Wanganui Athletic	4 - 0	Wanganui Technical Old Boys

Wembley Park, Wanganui
9 June 1962

St. Andrews	5 - 0	Palmerston North Thistle

Manawatu Sportsground, Palmerston North
9 June 1962

Dunedin HSOB	3 – 2	Mosgiel
Canadzich, Cross, Sutcliffe		Thomson ×2

Gardens Corner, Dunedin North
Referee: L. Rutherford
9 June 1962

King Edward TCOB (Dunedin)	3 – 1	Caversham
McFarlane, Conlon, Elmes		Churchill

Caledonian Ground, South Dunedin
Referee: R.McDonald
9 June 1962

Northern (Dunedin)	2 – 1	Maori Hill (Dunedin)
G. Little, Campbell		Ferguson

Ellis Park, Kaikorai Valley, Dunedin
Referee: L. Burgess
9 June 1962

Saint Kilda	1 – 1 (aet)*	Roslyn-Wakari
Van Schraa (pen.)		Kernaghan

Caledonian Ground, South Dunedin
Referee: M. Laing

* Won on corners by St. Kilda

=== Third round ===
16 June 1962

St. Andrews	4 - 1	Hastings City

Manawatu Sportsground, Palmerston North
16 June 1962

King Edward TCOB	4 – 1	Dunedin HSOB
Elmes ×2, Conlon, Connor		Cross

Caledonian Ground, South Dunedin
Referee: A. Patton
16 June 1962

Northern	6 – 3	Saint Kilda
G.Little ×3, P.Little, Campbell, Berry		Turnhout ×2, Durst

Caledonian Ground, South Dunedin
Referee: A. Williams
16 June 1962

Moturoa	1 – 0	Wanganui Athletic
E Meuli

Western Park, New Plymouth

=== Last 16 ===
28 July 1962

Western (Christchurch)	4 – 0	Timaru Thistle
Caldwell ×2, Clements ×2

English Park, Christchurch
28 July 1962

King Edward TCOB	0 – 3	Northern
		P. Little, G. Little, Rae (pen.)

Caledonian Ground, South Dunedin
Referee: W. Bamberry
30 June 1962

Moturoa	6 – 1	St. Andrews (Manawatu)
A. Varga ×3, M. Fugett, J. Marshall, L. Varga		M. Beatty

Western Park, New Plymouth
Referee: Mr. R. Harker (Wanganui)
30 June 1962

Seatoun	4 - 2	Northern

Basin Reserve, Wellington
30 June 1962

Kahukura	1 - 8	Hamilton Technical Old Boys

28 July 1962

North Shore United	2 - 1	Blockhouse Bay

Blandford Park, Auckland
1962

v

1962

v

=== Last eight ("Zone finals") ===
North Island Semi Final
4 August 1962

Moturoa	3 - 1	Seatoun AFC
L. Varga, A. Varga 2 (1 pen.)		R. O'Brien

Western Park, New Plymouth
Referee: Mr. E. E. Saker (Hawkes Bay)
South Island Semi-Final
4 August 1962

Northern	2 – 1 (aet)	Invercargill Thistle
Ferguson 2 (1 pen.)		Bennie

Queens Park, Mosgiel; (original venue was the Caledonian Ground)
Referee: W. Bamberry. Linesmen: D. Welham, A. Williams
South Island Semi Final
4 August 1962

Nelson Rangers	2 – 2 (aet)*	Western
McMillan, Bajema		Clements, Frost

Nelson

*Won on corners by Nelson

North Island Semi-Final
4 August 1962

Hamilton Technical Old Boys	4 – 2	North Shore United

Galloway Park, Hamilton

=== Semi-finals ("Island finals") ===
South Island Final

Nelson Rangers	1 – 2	NortherNorthernn
McWilliam		Ferguson, Thomas (og)

Trafalgar Park, Nelson
Referee: L. Coffman
North Island Final
18 August 1962

Hamilton Technical Old Boys	4 – 0	Moturoa
Dekkers, Feenstra, Jones, K. Poelmann

Seddon Park, Hamilton, Waikato
Attendance: 2000
Referee: Mr. T. Smith (Wellington)

=== Final ===
1962 Chatham Cup Final
1 September 1962

Hamilton Technical Old Boys	4 – 1	Northern
Jones ×2, Nevison, Feenstra		G. Little

Basin Reserve, Wellington
Referee: C. Dickie
