= 2019 Chatham Cup =

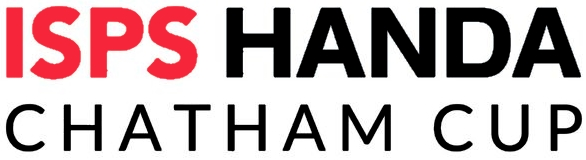

Tournament details
- Country: New Zealand
- Dates: 20 April 2019 – 7 September 2019
- Teams: 133

Final positions
- Champions: Napier City Rovers
- Runners-up: Melville United

Awards
- Jack Batty Trophy: Sho Goto

The 2019 Chatham Cup (known as the ISPS Handa Chatham Cup for sponsorship reasons) is New Zealand's 92nd annual knockout football competition.

The 2019 competition will have a preliminary round and four rounds proper before quarter-finals, semi-finals, and a final.

== Results ==
=== Preliminary round ===
Matches were played on Saturday 20 April, Monday 22 April and Anzac Day, Thursday 25 April.

Northern Region

20 April 2019	Tuakau	2–2 (a.e.t.) (4–5 p)	West Auckland Kiwi True Blues	Dr John Lightbody Reserve, Auckland
14:00	Hatton 33'; Neilands 74'	Report	Bond 48'; Greenaway 80' (pen.)

20 April 2019	Kaeo-Inter	4–3	Internationale	Whangaroa College, Kaeo
14:00	Rocque 20', 60'; Montino 35', 41'	Report	Sharif 7', 47'; O’Callaghan 68'

25 April 2019	Puhoi	3–2	Auckland Volcanoes	Puhoi Domain, Auckland
14:00	Creeze-Tetteroo 3'; Hadfield 29'; Marr 55'	Report	Hall 41'; O’Sullivan 69' (pen.)

25 April 2019	Zamantix Rovers	5–2	West Hamilton United	Michaels Ave Reserve, Auckland
14:00	Piskulic 38'; Wall 43'; Ward 68', 87'; Hawthorne 78' (pen.)	Report	Moynahan 5'; Palmer 37'

25 April 2019	Otorohanga	6–2	Independiente	Ōtorohanga Domain, Ōtorohanga
14:00	Wrack 5', 37', 45', 70'; Maguire 47'; Walker 83'	Report	Laing 42', 77'

25 April 2019	Kerikeri	3–1	Manukau City	Baysport Waipapa, Waipapa
14:00	Waller 2'; Brandes 3'; Roberts 5'	Report	Chand 6'

25 April 2019	Dalian	3–3 (a.e.t.) (4–5 p)	Matamata Swifts	Valonia Reserve, Auckland
14:00	Hong 58'; Li 70' (pen.), 90+3'	Report	Avergonzado 17'; Nowell 36'; Hills 90+7'

25 April 2019	Taupō	7–1	Lynn-Avon United	Crown Reserve, Taupō
14:00	Lamb 34', 61', 69', 90+3'; Lewis 41'; Yanasaki 41'; Smith 77'	Report	Baldwin 88'

25 April 2019	Bohemian Celtic	2–6	Onerahi	Colin Maiden Park, Auckland
14:00	Howell 20'; Ferguson 60'	Report	Morgan 28'; Hanmore 35', 85'; Hanmore 61', 90'; Bradshaw 75'

25 April 2019	HNK Auckland	2–1	Papamoa	Croatian Cultural Club, Auckland
14:00	Sardelic 17'; Urlovic 71'	Report	Kenny 90+5'

25 April 2019	University of Auckland	1–0	Warkworth	Cox's Bay Reserve, Auckland
14:00	Paetz 90+2'	Report

25 April 2019	Te Atatu	11–2	Whangarei	Te Atatū Peninsula Park, Auckland
14:00	Dalton 17', 64'; O’Brien 47', 57', 67', 71'; Rollinson 48', 74'; Batt 79', 86', 87'	Report	Power 50'; Ellis 90+1'

25 April 2019	Glen Eden Rangers	1–4	Ranui Swanson	Parrs Park, Auckland
14:00	Bedford 3'	Report	Luka 29'; Saavedra 40', 82'; Murch 44'

25 April 2019	Ngaruawahia United	0–0 (a.e.t.) (4–2 p)	Otumoetai	Centennial Park, Ngaruawahia
14:00		Report

25 April 2019	Te Awamutu	1–2	Waikato Unicol	Te Awamutu Stadium, Te Awamutu
14:30	Connor 7' (pen.)	Report	Payton 11', 43'

Central Region

25 April 2019	Gisborne Thistle	2–3	Havelock North Wanderers	Childers Road Reserve, Gisborne
14:00		Report	Grunwald 84'; Christensen 90'; Bloor 90'

Mainland Region

22 April 2019	St Albans Shirley	6–2	Parklands United	English Park, Christchurch
14:00	Van Der Meulen 26'; Morris 33'; Van Den Bergh 40', 64'; Urrea 51'; De Brauwer 69'	Report	Robson 11', 88'

22 April 2019	Christchurch United	1–0	Universities	Christchurch Football Centre, Christchurch
14:00	White	Report

Southern Region

25 April 2019	Mornington	1–5	West End	Tahuna Park, Dunedin
14:00	Pealing 15'	Report	Cox 10', 61', 65', 74'; Mundava 45+1'

25 April 2019	Geraldine	5–1	Grants Braes	Geraldine Domain, Geraldine
14:00		Report

25 April 2019	Thistle (Invercargill)	1–2	Gore Wanderers	ILT Football Turf, Invercargill
14:00	Larsen 29'	Report	de Jong 46'; Gibson 49'

All teams listed below received byes to the first round.

Northern Region: Eastern Suburbs, Central United, North Shore United, Onehunga Sports, Western Springs, Birkenhead United, Melville United, East Coast Bays, Hamilton Wanderers, Manukau United, Glenfield Rovers, Waitakere City, Bay Olympic, Mt Albert-Ponsonby, Forrest Hill-Milford United, Three Kings United, Takapuna, Ellerslie, Bucklands Beach, Tauranga City, Waitemata, Waiheke United, Fencibles United, Hibiscus Coast, Claudelands Rovers, Manurewa, Uni-Mount Bohemian Celtic, Cambridge, Albany United, Franklin United, Greenhithe Catimba, Metro, Oratia United, Onehunga Mangere United, Navy, Papatoetoe, Papakura City
Central Region: Napier City Rovers, Napier Marist, North End, Palmerston North Marist, New Plymouth Rangers
Capital Region: Western Suburbs, Brooklyn Northern United, Wellington Marist, Waterside Karori, Island Bay United, Kapiti Coast United, Lower Hutt City, Miramar Rangers, Naenae, North Wellington, Otaki Purutaitama, Upper Hutt City, Petone, Seatoun, Stokes Valley, Stop Out, Tawa, Victoria University, Wainuiomata, Wairarapa United, Wellington Olympic, Wellington United
Mainland Region: Nelson Suburbs, Tahuna, Central SC, FC Nelson, Cashmere Technical, Western, Coastal Spirit, Ferrymead Bays, Selwyn United, Nomads United, FC Twenty 11, Halswell United, Burwood, Waimakiriri United
Southern Region: Mosgiel, Otago University, Queenstown, Wanaka, Roslyn Wakari, Green Island, Caversham, Dunedin Technical, Northern, Queen's Park, Old Boys, Thistle (Timaru), Northern Hearts

=== Round 1 ===
Round 1 matches took place between 10 and 12 May 2019.

Northern Region

10 May 2019	Forrest Hill Milford United	3–1	Greenhithe Catimba	Becroft Park, Auckland
19:00		Report

10 May 2019	Metro	3–1	Waitemata	Phyllis Street Reserve, Auckland
19:30		Report

11 May 2019	Papakura City	2–6	Cambridge	McLennan Park, Auckland
14:00		Report

11 May 2019	Waikato Unicol	4–0	Bucklands Beach	Jansen Park, Hamilton
14:00		Report

11 May 2019	Albany United	5–1	Waiheke United	Rosedale Park, Auckland
14:00		Report

11 May 2019	University of Auckland	0–7	Claudelands Rovers	Cox's Bay Reserve, Auckland
14:00		Report

11 May 2019	Matamata Swifts	1–3	Fencibles United	Matamata Domain, Matamata
14:00		Report

11 May 2019	Three Kings United	0–3	Takapuna	Keith Hay Park, Auckland
14:00		Report

11 May 2019	Navy	1–6	Franklin United	Naval Sports Complex, Auckland
14:00		Report

11 May 2019	Manurewa	1–3	Tauranga City	War Memorial Park, Auckland
14:00		Report

11 May 2019	Ngaruawahia United	0–6	Ellerslie	Centennial Park, Ngaruawahia
14:00		Report

11 May 2019	Hibiscus Coast	0–2	Zamantix Rovers	Stanmore Bay Park, Whangaparaoa
14:00		Report

11 May 2019	Uni-Mount Bohemian Celtic	0–3	Taupō	Bill McKinlay Park, Auckland
14:00		Report

11 May 2019	Otorohanga	1–2	Papatoetoe	Ōtorohanga Domain, Ōtorohanga
14:00		Report

11 May 2019	Bay Olympic	4–0	West Auckland Kiwi True Blues	Olympic Park, Auckland
14:00		Report

11 May 2019	Puhoi	1–3	Onehunga Mangere United	Puhoi Domain, Puhoi
14:00		Report

11 May 2019	Mt Albert Ponsonby	3–2 (a.e.t.)	Ranui Swanson	Anderson Park, Auckland
14:00		Report

11 May 2019	Te Atatu	18–0	Kerikeri	Te Atatū Peninsula Park, Auckland
14:00		Report

11 May 2019	Onerahi	2–1	Kaeo-Inter	Onerahi Airport, Onerahi
14:00		Report

12 May 2019	HNK Auckland	1–2 (a.e.t.)	Oratia United	Croatian Cultural Club, Auckland
14:00		Report

Central / Capital Region

11 May 2019	Havelock North Wanderers	6–0	North End	Guthrie Park, Havelock North
12:00		Report

11 May 2019	Palmerston North Marist	2–4 (a.e.t.)	Napier City Rovers	Memorial Park, Palmerston North
2:00		Report

11 May 2019	Stokes Valley	3–2	Brooklyn Northern United	Delaney Park, Lower Hutt
14:00		Report

11 May 2019	Otaki Purutaitama	0–4	Tawa	Haruatai Park, Otaki
14:00		Report

11 May 2019	Wainuiomata	3–4	Seatoun	Richard Prouse Park, Lower Hutt
14:00		Report

11 May 2019	Wellington Marist	0–4	Wellington Olympic	Kilbirnie Park, Wellington
14:00		Report

11 May 2019	Kapiti Coast United	0–8	Stop Out	Weka Park, Kāpiti
14:00		Report

11 May 2019	Naenae	1–6	Island Bay United	Naenae Park, Lower Hutt
14:00		Report

11 May 2019	Petone	1–5	Miramar Rangers	Memorial Park, Lower Hutt
15:00		Report

11 May 2019	Victoria University	3–1	Wellington United	Boyd-Wilson Field, Wellington
15:30		Report

11 May 2019	Wairarapa United	0–3	Upper Hutt City	Memorial Park, Masterton
17:30		Report

12 May 2019	New Plymouth Rangers	0–3	Napier Marist	Yarrow Stadium, New Plymouth
14:00		Report

Mainland Region

11 May 2019	Waimakariri United	2–3	Western	Rangiora A&P Showgrounds, Rangiora
14:00		Report

11 May 2019	Halswell United	1–2	Ferrymead Bays	Halswell Domain, Christchurch
14:00		Report

11 May 2019	Nomads United	2–0	Burwood	Tulett Park, Christchurch
14:00		Report

11 May 2019	Cashmere Technical	2–2 (a.e.t.) (5–4 p)	Coastal Spirit	Garrick Memorial Park, Christchurch
14:00		Report

11 May 2019	FC Twenty 11	4–2	St Albans Shirley	Avonhead Park, Christchurch
14:00		Report

11 May 2019	Tahuna	1–0	Central SC	Athletic Park, Blenheim
15:00		Report

11 May 2019	Selwyn United	1–3	Christchurch United	Foster Park, Christchurch
18:00		Report

12 May 2019	Nelson Suburbs	6–0	FC Nelson	Saxton Field, Nelson
14:00		Report

Southern Region

11 May 2019	Mosgiel	6–2	Green Island	Memorial Park, Mosgiel
14:00		Report

11 May 2019	Gore Wanderers	3–3 (a.e.t.) (3–4 p)	West End	Hyde Park, Gore
14:00		Report

11 May 2019	Queen's Park	0–2	Otago University	Queen's Park, Invercargill
14:00		Report

11 May 2019	Wanaka	3–2	Geraldine	Wānaka Recreation Centre, Wānaka
14:00		Report

11 May 2019	Timaru Thistle	0–6	Roslyn Wakari	Anzac Square, Timaru
14:00		Report

11 May 2019	Dunedin Technical	5–1	Old Boys	Tahuna Park, Dunedin
14:00		Report

11 May 2019	Queenstown Rovers	3–2 (a.e.t.)	Northern	Queenstown Events Centre, Queenstown
14:00		Report

11 May 2019	Caversham	7–0	Northern Hearts	Tonga Park, Dunedin
14:00		Report

All teams listed below received byes to the second round.

Northern Region: Glenfield Rovers, North Shore United, Manukau United, Melville United, Birkenhead United, Western Springs, East Coast Bays, Hamilton Wanderers, Onehunga Sports, Central United, Eastern Suburbs, Waitakere City
Capital Region: Lower Hutt City, North Wellington, Western Suburbs, Waterside Karori

=== Round 2 ===
All matches were played on Queen's Birthday weekend 31 May-3 June 2019.

Northern Region

31 May 2019	Western Springs	5–2	Hamilton Wanderers	Seddon Fields, Auckland
19:15 NZDT		Report

31 May 2019	Metro	9–2	Te Atatu	Phyllis Street Reserve, Auckland
19:30 NZDT		Report

1 June 2019	Taupō	2–3	Albany United	Crown Park, Taupō
14:00 NZDT		Report

1 June 2019	Zamantix Rovers	0–2	Franklin United	Michaels Ave Reserve, Auckland
14:00 NZDT		Report

1 June 2019	Melville United	7–0	Claudelands Rovers	Gower Park, Hamilton
14:00 NZDT		Report

1 June 2019	Waitakere City	2–1	Ellerslie	Fred Taylor Park, Auckland
14:00 NZDT		Report

1 June 2019	Fencibles United	1–5	Eastern Suburbs	Riverhills Park, Auckland
14:00 NZDT		Report

1 June 2019	Cambridge	4–5	Glenfield Rovers	John Kerkhof Park, Cambridge
14:00 NZDT		Report

1 June 2019	Bay Olympic	2–1	Birkenhead United	Olympic Park, Auckland
14:00 NZDT		Report

1 June 2019	Takapuna	1–4	Onehunga Sports	Taharoto Park, Auckland
14:00 NZDT		Report

1 June 2019	Tauranga City	0–4	Forrest Hill Milford United	Links Ave, Tauranga
14:00 NZDT		Report

1 June 2019	Manukau United	13–0	Onerahi	Centre Park, Auckland
14:00 NZDT		Report

1 June 2019	Onehunga-Mangere United	2–5	East Coast Bays	Mangere Domain, Auckland
14:00 NZDT		Report

1 June 2019	Central United	3–0	Oratia United	Croatian Cultural Club, Auckland
14:00 NZDT		Report

2 June 2019	Mt Albert Ponsonby	5–1	Papatoetoe	Anderson Park, Auckland
14:00 NZDT		Report

3 June 2019	Waikato Unicol	1–6	North Shore United	Jansen Park, Hamilton
14:00 NZDT		Report

Capital / Central Region

3 June 2019	Havelock North Wanderers	1–5	North Wellington	Guthrie Park, Havelock North
		Report

3 June 2019	Lower Hutt City	3–3 (a.e.t.) (4–2 p)	Victoria University	Fraser Park, Lower Hutt
		Report

3 June 2019	Miramar Rangers	8–1	Island Bay United	David Farrington Park, Wellington
		Report

3 June 2019	Stop Out	3–1	Napier Marist	Hutt Park, Lower Hutt
		Report

3 June 2019	Stokes Valley	0–13	Wellington Olympic	Delaney Park, Lower Hutt
		Report

3 June 2019	Upper Hutt City	0–2	Seatoun	Maidstone Park, Upper Hutt
		Report

3 June 2019	Western Suburbs	1–0	Waterside Karori	Endeavour Park, Wellington
		Report

3 June 2019	Napier City Rovers	4–0	Tawa	Bluewater Stadium, Napier
		Report

Mainland Region

30 May 2019	Nelson Suburbs	7–0	Tahuna	Saxton Field, Nelson
		Report

3 June 2019	FC Twenty 11	0–4	Ferrymead Bays	Avonhead Park, Christchurch
		Report

3 June 2019	Western	0–1	Christchurch United	Walter Park, Christchurch
		Report

3 June 2019	Cashmere Technical	5–0	Nomads United	Garrick Memorial Park, Christchurch
		Report

Southern Region

1 June 2019	West End	3–0*	Mosgiel	West End Park, Timaru
		Report

1 June 2019	Dunedin Technical	1–4	Roslyn Wakari	Tahuna Park, Dunedin
		Report

1 June 2019	Caversham	5–0	Queenstown Rovers	Tonga Park, Dunedin
		Report

1 June 2019	Wanaka	3–5	Otago University	Wānaka Recreation Centre, Wānaka
		Report

*The match between Mosgiel and West End was originally an on-field 5–0 win for Mosgiel but they were deemed to have fielded an ineligible player and the result was overturn to a 3–0 loss instead. West End progressed to round three.

=== Round 3 ===
All matches were played on the weekend of 15–16 June 2019.

Northern Region

15 June 2019	Albany United	1–0	Metro	Rosedale Park, Auckland
		Report

15 June 2019	Bay Olympic	3–1	Central United	Olympic Park, Auckland
		Report

15 June 2019	Waitakere City	5–2 (a.e.t.)	Mt Albert Ponsonby	Fred Taylor Park, Auckland
		Report

15 June 2019	Onehunga Sports	4–1	Forrest Hill Milford United	Waikaraka Park, Auckland
		Report

15 June 2019	North Shore United	3–2	Western Springs	Allen Hill Stadium, Auckland
		Report

15 June 2019	Eastern Suburbs	8–0	Franklin United	Madills Farm, Auckland
		Report

15 June 2019	Manukau United	4–2	Glenfield Rovers	Centre Park, Auckland
		Report

16 June 2019	East Coast Bays	2–8	Melville United	Bay City Park, Auckland
		Report

Central / Capital Region

15 June 2019	Stop Out	1–3	Wellington Olympic	Hutt Park, Lower Hutt
		Report

15 June 2019	Lower Hutt City	2–5 (a.e.t.)	Miramar Rangers	Fraser Park, Lower Hutt
		Report

16 June 2019	Napier City Rovers	3–1	Seatoun	Bluewater Stadium, Napier
		Report

16 June 2019	North Wellington	3–4	Western Suburbs	Alex Moore Park, Wellington
		Report

Mainland

15 June 2019	Cashmere Technical	1–1 (a.e.t.) (4–5 p)	Christchurch United	Garrick Memorial Park, Christchurch
		Report

16 June 2019	Nelson Suburbs	11–1	Ferrymead Bays	Saxton Field, Nelson
		Report

Southern Region

15 June 2019	Otago University	0–3	Caversham	Caledonian Ground, Dunedin
		Report

15 June 2019	Roslyn Wakari	7–1	West End	Ellis Park, Dunedin
		Report

=== Round 4 ===
All matches were played on the weekend of 6–7 July 2019.

Northern Region

6 July 2019	Albany United	1–0	Eastern Suburbs	Rosedale Park, Auckland
14:00	Nkoy 66'	Report

6 July 2019	Waitakere City	1–3	Melville United	Fred Taylor Park, Auckland
14:00	Manickum 20'	Report	Davies 57'; Jones 70'; Richards 86'

6 July 2019	Bay Olympic	3–0	Manukau United	Olympic Park, Auckland
14:00	Colligan 68'; Bonkovich 71'; Burfoot 76'	Report

6 July 2019	Onehunga Sports	2–0	North Shore United	Waikaraka Park, Auckland
14:00	Hudson-Wihongi 76'; Porter 89'	Report

Capital / Central Region

6 July 2019	Miramar Rangers	1–3 (a.e.t.)	Wellington Olympic	David Farrington Park, Wellington
14:00	Kilkolly 75' (pen.)	Report	Ward 7'; Mata 109'; Palezevic 120'

7 July 2019	Napier City Rovers	4–1	Western Suburbs	Bluewater Stadium, Napier
14:00	Neil 18'; Hoy 33'; Schofield 40'; McNamara 80'	Report	Billingsley 44'

Mainland / Southern Region

6 July 2019	Christchurch United	2–1	Nelson Suburbs	Christchurch Football Centre, Christchurch
14:00	White 12'; 90' (o.g.)	Report	McClay 24'

7 July 2019	Roslyn Wakari	2–3	Caversham	Ellis Park, Dunedin
14:00	Clissold 45'; Wilkie 56'	Report	De Groot-Green 7', 90+2'; Neil 19'

=== Quarter-finals ===
The quarter-finals were played on the weekend of 3–4 August 2019.

3 August 2019	Onehunga Sports	5–4 (a.e.t.)	Wellington Olympic	Waikaraka Park, Auckland
13:30		Report

3 August 2019	Caversham	1–2	Bay Olympic	Hancock Park, Dunedin
14:00		Report

3 August 2019	Melville United	4–0	Christchurch United	Gower Park, Hamilton
14:00		Report

4 August 2019	Napier City Rovers	2–2 (a.e.t.) (4–3 p)	Albany United	Bluewater Stadium, Napier
14:00		Report

=== Semi-finals ===
The semi-finals were played on the weekend of 24–25 August 2019.

24 August 2019	Bay Olympic	0–2	Melville United	Olympic Park, Auckland
14:00		Report	Wisnewski 22'; Christensen-Rose 80'

25 August 2019	Napier City Rovers	2–1 (a.e.t.)	Onehunga Sports	Bluewater Stadium, Napier
14:00	Schofield 91'; Mandair 96'	Report	Tipelu 114'

=== Final ===
The final was played on 8 September 2019.

8 September 2019	Melville United	2–3	Napier City Rovers	North Harbour Stadium, Auckland
15:00	Marquez 12'; Scott 86'	Report	McNamara 82'; Schofield 85'; Goto 89'	Referee: Antony Riley
