= 2018 Southern Football League (New Zealand) =

Southern Football League
- Season: 2018
- Dates: 30 June - 1 September
- Champions: Cashmere Technical
- Matches: 28
- Goals: 121 (4.32 per match)
- Top goalscorer: Cameron Gordon (10 goals)
- Biggest home win: Nelson Suburbs 5–0 Queenstown (21 July); Nomads United 5–0 Southland United (29 July)
- Biggest away win: Queenstown 1–11 Coastal Spirit (28 July)
- Highest scoring: Queenstown 1–11 Coastal Spirit (28 July)
- Longest winning run: 5 matches Nelson Suburbs
- Longest unbeaten run: 7 matches Cashmere Technical
- Longest winless run: 7 matches Otago University
- Longest losing run: 6 matches Otago University

The 2018 Southern Football League was the first season of the second level of men's football in New Zealand's South Island.

Caversham were the 2017 South Island Football Championship champions. Ferrymead Bays were the 2017 Mainland Premier League champions and Caversham were the 2017 FootballSouth Premier League champions.

== Qualifying Leagues ==
=== Mainland Premier League ===
Mainland Premier League
- Season: 2018
- Dates: 17 March - 9 June
- Champions: Cashmere Technical
- Matches: 56
- Goals: 262 (4.68 per match)
- Top goalscorer: Stephen Hoyle (15 goals)
- Biggest home win: Cashmere Technical 9–1 Canterbury Universities (25 April)
- Biggest away win: FC Twenty 11 1–6 Cashmere Technical (19 May 2018); Nelson Suburbs 0–5 Coastal Spirit (2 June)
- Highest scoring: Selwyn United 6–6 Ferrymead Bays (24 March)

The 2018 Mainland Premier League was the 17th season of the league, the 21st season of premiership football in the upper South Island. The shortened season started on 17 March, and finished on 9 June, being a double round. The league was to determine the top five teams in Mainland's federation, who go on to play the top three teams from FootballSouth; with the bottom three will play in the teams with will play each other twice to determine who will face relegation to the Canterbury Championship League, both starting after this league finishes.

==== Mainland Premier League teams ====
Eight team are competing in this league - seven from the previous season and one promoted team. The promoted team is Selwyn United, who replaced Western after five seasons.

Team	Home ground	Location	2017 season
Canterbury Universities	Ilam Fields	Ilam, Christchurch	7th
Cashmere Technical	Garrick Memorial Park	Woolston, Christchurch	2nd
Coastal Spirit	English Park	St Albans, Christchurch	3rd
FC Twenty 11	Avonhead Park	Avonhead, Christchurch	5th
Ferrymead Bays	Ferrymead Park	Ferrymead, Christchurch	1st
Nelson Suburbs	Saxton Field	Stoke, Nelson	4th
Nomads United	Tullet Park	Casebrook, Christchurch	6th
Selwyn United	Foster Park	Rollerston, Canterbury	1st in Canterbury Championship League (promoted)

==== Mainland Premier League personnel ====
Team	Manager
Canterbury Universities	
Cashmere Technical	(New Zealand) Jesse Rawlings
Cashmere Technical	(New Zealand) Deane Hutchinson
Coastal Spirit	(New Zealand) Ekow Quainoo
FC Twenty 11	(New Zealand) Glen Lapslie
Ferrymead Bays	(New Zealand) Danny Halligan
Nelson Suburbs	(New Zealand) Steve Bignall
Nomads United	(Wales) Andrew Pitman
Selwyn United	(England) Lee Padmore

==== Mainland Premier League table ====
Pos	Team	Pld	W	D	L	GF	GA	GD	Pts	Qualification
1	Cashmere Technical	14	11	3	0	52	17	+35	36	Champions and qualification to Southern Football League
2	Coastal Spirit	14	10	1	3	35	10	+25	31	Qualification to Southern Football League
3	Ferrymead Bays	14	8	2	4	37	24	+13	26	Qualification to Southern Football League
4	Nelson Suburbs	14	7	3	4	31	26	+5	24	Qualification to Southern Football League
5	Nomads United	14	7	1	6	42	40	+2	22	Qualification to Southern Football League
6	FC Twenty 11	14	4	1	9	20	39	−19	13	Qualification to Mainland Premier Qualifying League
7	Selwyn United	14	1	3	10	31	51	−20	6	Qualification to Mainland Premier Qualifying League
8	Canterbury Universities	14	1	0	13	14	55	−41	3	Qualification to Mainland Premier Qualifying League Relegated to Canterbury Championship League

Source: Oceania Football, Ultimate New Zealand
Rules for classification: 1) Points; 2) Head to head; 3) Disciplinary record (1 Disciplinary Point for Yellow, 3 Disciplinary Points for Red); 4) Coin toss

==== Mainland Premier League results table ====
Home \ Away	CU	CT	CS	FC	FB	NS	NU	SU
Canterbury Universities		0–3	0–4	0–2	0–2	3–4	0–3	3–1
Cashmere Technical	9–1		0–0	3–1	5–1	4–2	4–3	6–1
Coastal Spirit	4–0	1–2		5–1	0–1	3–1	4–0	3–1
FC Twenty 11	3–0	1–6	0–1		1–2	0–4	3–6	3–1
Ferrymead Bays	7–0	0–2	0–1	3–0		1–2	4–2	3–2
Nelson Suburbs	2–1	2–2	0–5	4–0	1–1		4–1	2–1
Nomads United	6–3	2–2	1–0	3–4	2–6	2–1		6–2
Selwyn United	5–3	2–4	3–4	1–1	6–6	2–2	3–5	

Source: Oceania Football, Ultimate New Zealand
Legend: Blue = home team win; Yellow = draw; Red = away team win.

==== Mainland Premier League top scorers ====
Rank	Player	Club	Goals
1	(England) Stephen Hoyle	Nomads United	15
2	(South Africa) Lyle Matthysen	Cashmere Technical	13
3	(England) Dan Ede	Selwyn United	12
3	(New Zealand) Anthony Jones	Coastal Spirit	12
5	(New Zealand) Nishan Bishwa	Nomads United	9
6	(New Zealand) Aidan Barbour-Ryan	Selwyn United	7
6	(New Zealand) Max Chrétien	Cashmere Technical	7
6	(England) Byron Heath	Selwyn United	7
6	(England) Andrew Tuckey	Cashmere Technical	7
6	(England) Ben Wright	Nelson Suburbs	7
6	(New Zealand) Haris Zeb	Coastal Spirit	7

==== Mainland Premier League hat-tricks ====
Round	Player	For	Against	Home/Away	Result	Date
1	(New Zealand) Anthony Jones	Coastal Spirit	Selwyn United	Away	3–4	17 March 2018
2	(New Zealand) Michael Forshaw	Ferrymead Bays	Selwyn United	Away	6–6	24 March 2018
5	(Guatemala) Juan José Chang	Ferrymead Bays	Canterbury University	Home	7–0	7 April 2018
5	(New Zealand) Nishan Bishwa	Nomads United	Selwyn United	Home	6–2	7 April 2018
5	(England) Stephen Hoyle	Nomads United	Selwyn United	Home	6–2	7 April 2018
8	(New Zealand) Max Chrétien	Cashmere Technical	Canterbury University	Home	9–1	25 April 2018
8	(England) Tom Schwarz	Cashmere Technical	Canterbury University	Home	9–1	25 April 2018
9	(England) Stephen Hoyle	Nomads United	FC Twenty 11	Away	3–6	28 April 2018
11	(New Zealand) Byron Heath	Nomads United	Canterbury University	Home	6–3	19 May 2018
11	(South Africa) Lyle Matthysen	Cashmere Technical	FC Twenty 11	Away	1–6	19 May 2018
12	(England) Stephen Hoyle	Nomads United	Selwyn United	Away	5–3	26 May 2018
13	(New Zealand) Haris Zeb (Note: Player scored 4 goals)	Coastal Spirit	Nelson Suburbs	Away	0–5	2 June 2018

=== FootballSouth Premier League ===
FootballSouth Premier League
- Season: 2018
- Dates: 7 April - 16 June
- Champions: Dunedin Technical
- Matches: 36
- Goals: 144 (4 per match)
- Top goalscorer: Timothy McLennan (10 goals)
- Biggest home win: Green Island 7–0 Northern (5 May 2018)
- Biggest away win: Northern 0–8 Roslyn Wakari (28 April 2018)
- Highest scoring: Mosgiel 7–2 Otago University (26 May 2018)

The 2018 FootballSouth Premier League was the 19th season of premiership football in the lower South Island. The shortened season started on 7 April, and finished on 16 June, being a single round. The league was to determine the top three teams in FootballSouth's federation, who go on to play the top five teams from Mainland Football. The bottom seven team will play in the in FootballSouth Championship League, starting after this league finishes.

==== FootballSouth Premier League teams ====
Nine teams are competing in the league - all teams from the previous season.

Team	Home ground	Location	2017 season
Caversham	Tonga Park	South Dunedin, Dunedin	1st
Dunedin Technical	Tahuna Park	Tahuna, Dunedin	3rd
Green Island	Sunnyvale Park	Green Island, Dunedin	2nd
Mosgiel	Mosgiel Memorial Park	Mosgiel	7th
Northern	Forrester Park	Normanby, Dunedin	9th
Otago University	Logan Park	Dunedin North, Dunedin	8th
Queenstown	Queenstown Events Centre	Frankton, Queenstown	4th
Roslyn Wakari	Ellis Park	Glenross, Dunedin	5th
Southland United	ILT Football Turf	Invercargill	6th

==== FootballSouth Premier League personnel ====
Team	Manager	Captain
Caversham	(New Zealand) Richard Murray	(New Zealand) Andrew Ridden
Dunedin Technical	(New Zealand) Phillips Paul	(England) Michael Neaverson
Green Island	(New Zealand) Richard Kerrbell	(New Zealand) Cody Robinson
Mosgiel	(New Zealand) Cameron McPhail	(New Zealand) Rory Findlay
Northern	(Brazil) Luiz Uehara	(New Zealand) Lathim Greig
Otago University	(New Zealand) Darren Hart	(New Zealand) Dominic Scahill
Queenstown	(New Zealand) Jamie Whitmarsh	(New Zealand) Lewis Walters
Roslyn Wakari	(New Zealand) Colin Thom	(New Zealand) Luke Clissold
Southland United	(New Zealand) Greig Evans	(New Zealand) Jack Boland

==== FootballSouth Premier League table ====
Pos	Team	Pld	W	D	L	GF	GA	GD	Pts	Qualification
1	Dunedin Technical	8	5	2	1	20	8	+12	17	Champions and qualification to Southern Football League
2	Queenstown	8	5	1	2	18	10	+8	16	Qualification to Southern Football League
3	Southland United	8	5	1	2	16	16	0	16	Qualification to Southern Football League
4	Caversham	8	4	3	1	18	8	+10	15	Qualification to FootballSouth Championship
5	Roslyn-Wakari	8	4	2	2	20	9	+11	14	Qualification to FootballSouth Championship
6	Mosgiel	8	3	1	4	19	17	+2	10	Qualification to FootballSouth Championship
7	Green Island	8	3	1	4	14	14	0	10	Qualification to FootballSouth Championship
8	Northern	8	1	0	7	11	33	−22	3	Qualification to FootballSouth Championship
9	Otago University	8	0	1	7	8	29	−21	1	Qualification to FootballSouth Championship

Source: Oceanic Football, Ultimate New Zealand
Rules for classification: 1) Points; 2) Goal difference; 3) Goals scored; 4) Goals against; 5) Head to head; 6) Disciplinary record; 7) Coin toss

==== FootballSouth Premier League results table ====
Home \ Away	CA	DT	GI	MO	NO	OU	QT	RW	SU
Caversham			3–0	2–2		4–0	2–0		
Dunedin Technical	0–0			3–1	4–1				4–0
Green Island		1–3			7–0			1–2	2–2
Mosgiel			1–2		3–1	7–2	1–5		
Northern	3–5					4–1	0–1	0–8	
Otago University		1–3	0–1				2–2	1–4	
Queenstown		3–2	3–0					2–0	2–3
Roslyn-Wakari	2–2	1–1		2–0					1–2
Southland United	1–0			0–4	4–2	4–1			

Source: Oceanic Football, Ultimate New Zealand
Legend: Blue = home team win; Yellow = draw; Red = away team win.

==== FootballSouth Premier League top scorers ====
Rank	Player	Club	Goals
1	(New Zealand) Timothy McLennan	Dunedin Technical	9
2	(New Zealand) Riley Anderton	Mosgiel	7
2	(New Zealand) Regan Coldicott	Mosgiel	7
2	(England) Nick Treadwell	Roslyn Wakari	7
5	(New Zealand) Cameron Anderson	Roslyn Wakari	6
5	(New Zealand) Ryan Hawken	Northern	6
5	(New Zealand) Michael Hogan	Caversham	6
8	(New Zealand) Joshua Cartman	Queenstown	5
8	(New Zealand) Max Johnston	Green Island	5
8	(Japan) Hayato Wakino	Southland United	5

==== FootballSouth Premier League hat-tricks ====
Round	Player	For	Against	Home/Away	Result	Date
2	(New Zealand) Regan Coldicott	Mosgiel	Northern	Home	3–1	14 April 2018
4	(New Zealand) Joshua Cartman	Mosgiel	Queenstown	Away	1–5	28 April 2018
4	(New Zealand) Michael Hogan	Caversham	Otago University	Home	4–0	28 April 2018
4	(England) Nick Treadwell	Roslyn Wakari	Northern	Away	0–8	28 April 2018
5	(New Zealand) Christopher Kessell	Green Island	Northern	Home	7–0	5 May 2018
7	(New Zealand) Riley Anderton	Mosgiel	Otago University	Home	7–2	26 May 2018

==== FootballSouth Premier League own-goals ====
Round	Player	Club	H/A	Time	Goal	Result	Opponent	Date
1	(New Zealand) George Thrussell	Dunedin Technical	Away	67'	1–2	1–3	Otago University	7 April 2018

== Southern Football League ==
The Southern Football League is the culmination of the two regional leagues, each of which provide teams to the Southern Football League. The top five teams in the Mainland Premier League and top three teams from the FootballSouth Premier League qualify for entry into the Southern Football League.

=== Qualified Teams ===
Association	Team	Position in Regional League	App (last)	Previous best (last)
Mainland Football (5 berths)	Cashmere Technical	1st	1st	Debut
Mainland Football (5 berths)	Coastal Spirit	2nd	1st	Debut
Mainland Football (5 berths)	Ferrymead Bays	3rd	1st	Debut
Mainland Football (5 berths)	Nelson Suburbs	4th	1st	Debut
Mainland Football (5 berths)	Nomads United	5th	1st	Debut
FootballSouth (3 berths)	Dunedin Technical	1st	1st	Debut
FootballSouth (3 berths)	Queenstown	2nd	1st	Debut
FootballSouth (3 berths)	Southland United	3rd	1st	Debut

=== Southern Football League table ===
Pos	Team	Pld	W	D	L	GF	GA	GD	Pts	Qualification
1	Cashmere Technical	7	6	1	0	20	5	+15	19	Winner of Southern Football League
2	Nomads United	7	4	2	1	23	10	+13	14	
3	Ferrymead Bays	7	3	3	1	14	10	+4	12	
4	Nelson Suburbs	7	3	1	3	14	10	+4	10	
5	Queenstown	7	3	0	4	14	32	−18	9	
6	Coastal Spirit	7	2	1	4	21	14	+7	7	
7	Dunedin Technical	7	1	2	4	11	17	−6	5	
8	Southland United	7	1	0	6	4	23	−19	3	

Source: Oceanic Football, Ultimate New Zealand
Rules for classification: 1) Points; 2) Goal difference; 3) Goals scored; 4) Goals against; 5) Head to head; 6) Disciplinary record; 7) Coin toss

=== Southern Football League results table ===
Home \ Away	CT	CS	DT	FB	NS	NU	QT	SU
Cashmere Technical		2–0	2–0	1–1			5–3	
Coastal Spirit			3–3	1–2		3–4		1–2
Dunedin Technical				1–2		2–2	1–3	3–0
Ferrymead Bays					1–1	1–1	3–5	
Nelson Suburbs	0–3	0–2	5–1				5–0	
Nomads United	1–3				3–0			6–1
Queenstown		1–11				0–6		2–1
Southland United	0–4			0–4	0–3			

Source: Oceanic Football, Ultimate New Zealand
Legend: Blue = home team win; Yellow = draw; Red = away team win.

==== Southern Football League top scorers ====
Rank	Player	Club	Goals
1	(New Zealand) Byron Heath	Nomads United	10
2	(England) Stephen Hoyle	Nomads United	7
2	(New Zealand) Ashley Wellbourn	Coastal Spirit	7
4	(South Africa) Lyle Matthysen	Cashmere Technical	6
5	(New Zealand) Joshua Cartman	Queenstown	5
5	(New Zealand) Aaron Clapham	Cashmere Technical	5
5	(New Zealand) Edward Sillars	Nelson Suburbs	5
8	(New Zealand) Jan Kumar	Queenstown	4
8	(England) Mark Peers	Ferrymead Bays	4
8	(New Zealand) Alistair Rickerby	Dunedin Technical	4
11	(Guatemala) Juan José Chang	Ferrymead Bays	3
11	(New Zealand) Liam Hare	Coastal Spirit	3
11	(New Zealand) Adam Hewson	Queenstown	3
11	(New Zealand) Sho Mathieson	Ferrymead Bays	3
11	(England) Tom Schwarz	Cashmere Technical	3
11	(Northern Ireland) Ryan Stewart	Nelson Suburbs	3
11	(New Zealand) Haris Zeb	Coastal Spirit	3

==== Southern Football League hat-tricks ====
Round	Player	For	Against	Home/Away	Result	Date
1	(New Zealand) Aaron Clapham	Cashmere Technical	Queenstown	Home	5–3	30 June 2018
3	(New Zealand) Byron Heath	Nomads United	Coastal Spirit	Away	3–4	21 July 2018
3	(Northern Ireland) Ryan Stewart	Nelson Suburbs	Queenstown	Home	5–0	21 July 2018
4	(New Zealand) Ashley Wellbourn	Coastal Spirit	Queenstown	Away	1–11	28 July 2018
6	(New Zealand) Byron Heath	Nomads United	Queenstown	Away	0–6	18 August 2018
7	(New Zealand) Jan Kumar	Queenstown	Ferrymead Bays	Away	3–5	25 August 2018

==== Southern Premier League own-goals ====
Round	Player	Club	H/A	Time	Goal	Result	Opponent	Date
1	(New Zealand) Zac Muir	Nelson Suburbs	Home	32'	0–2	0–2	Coastal Spirit	1 July 2018
6	(New Zealand) Cohen Nash	Queenstown	Home	90'	0–6	0–6	Nomads United	18 August 2018
6	(New Zealand) Sean Angus	Southland United	Home	46'	0–1	0–4	Ferrymead Bays	19 August 2018
7	(New Zealand) Sam Ayers	Nelson Suburbs	Home	36'	0–2	0–3	Cashmere Technical	1 September 2018
