= James Ferrier =

James Ferrier may refer to:

- James Frederick Ferrier (1808–1864), Scottish metaphysical writer
- James Ferrier (politician) (1800–1888), mayor of Montreal from 1845 to 1846
- Jim Ferrier (1915–1986), Australian golfer
- Jim Ferrier (footballer), New Zealand international football (soccer) player
