= William Kilgour =

New Zealand cricketer (1878–1935)

Personal information
- Full name: William Alexander Kilgour
- Born: 2 February 1878; Dunedin, Otago, New Zealand
- Died: 4 March 1935 (aged 57); Auckland, New Zealand

Domestic team information
- Years: Team
- 1901/02–1907/08: Otago
- FC debut: 26 December 1901 Otago v Canterbury
- Last FC: 2 January 1908 Otago v Auckland
- Source: ESPNcricinfo, 15 May 2016

William Alexander Kilgour (2 February 1878 – 4 March 1935) was a New Zealand sportsman. He played both association football and cricket for Otago provincial sides, playing four first-class cricket matches for the Otago cricket team between the 1901–02 and 1907–08 seasons, and played rugby union for league sides.

Kilgour was born at Dunedin in 1878. Nicknamed "Little Billy" due to his short stature, he played club cricket for the Opoho club, association football for Northern AFC and rugby union for the Union club in Dunedin. He played both association football and cricket for provincial sides, and was considered "a very clever footballer and a splendid field at cricket".

He made his first-class cricket debut for the representative side in a December 1901 match against Canterbury at Christchurch, making scores of 1 and 11 in the match. A further match followed later in the month against Hawke's Bay but Kilgour did not play for Otago again until a match against the touring Australians in March 1905. His final match came in January 1908 when he was allowed to act as a full substitute for Gillie Wilson who was injured in the first 20 minutes play. In total Kilgour scored 45 runs in seven first-class innings, his highest score the 11 runs he made on debut.

Kilgour worked in the Dunedin legal firm Callan and Gallaway for many years before moving to Henderson near Auckland to grow grapes. He died at Auckland Hospital in 1935 at the age of 57.
