= Wally Meehan =

New Zealand footballer

Personal information
- Full name: T Walter Meehan
- Place of birth: New Zealand
- Position: Centre-half

Senior career*
Years	Team	Apps	(Gls)
- Northern AFC

International career
1951	New Zealand	4	(0)
- * Club domestic league appearances and goals

Wally Meehan is a former association football player who represented New Zealand at international level.

Meehan made his full New Zealand debut in a 0–2 loss to New Caledonia on 19 September 1951 and ended his international playing career with four official A-international caps to his credit, his final appearance in a 3–1 win over New Caledonia on 30 September 1951.
