= David Schipper =

American professional soccer player (born 1991)

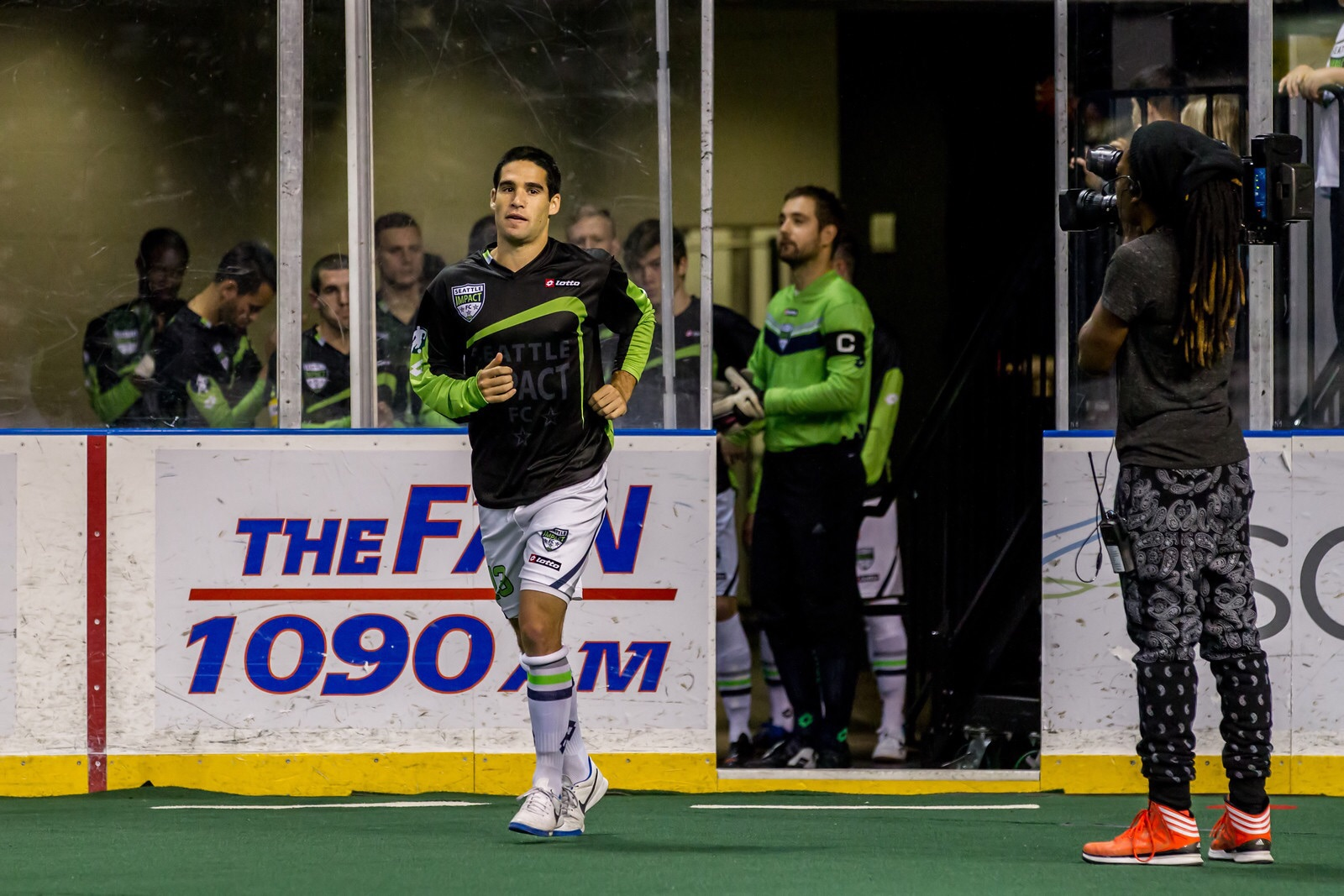
- Schipper in 2014

Personal information
- Date of birth: September 27, 1991 (age 35)
- Place of birth: San Diego, California, United States
- Height: 5 ft 8 in (1.73 m)
- Position: Midfielder

Team information
- Current team: Southwestern Jaguars (assistant)

Youth career
- 2006–2010: Nomads SC

College career
Years	Team	Apps	(Gls)
2010–2014	Arizona Wildcats		

Senior career*
Years	Team	Apps	(Gls)
2011	FC Tucson		
2012–2013	Chula Vista FC		
2014	Seattle Impact (indoor)	6	(3)
2014	FC Force	11	(4)
2015–2017	York Region Shooters	56	(17)
2015	→ Goiatuba (loan)	12	(2)
2017–2018	Albatroz SC	27	(9)
2017	→ FK Jūrnieks (loan)	4	(0)
2018	Southern United	0	(0)
2018	Southland United	34	(14)

Managerial career
- 2020–2021: Cal State Bakersfield Roadrunners (women, assistant)
- 2022–: Southwestern Jaguars (assistant)
- * Club domestic league appearances and goals

David Schipper (born September 27, 1991) is an American soccer coach and retired player.

== Career ==
=== Early career ===
Schipper was born and raised in San Diego, California. He attended Bonita Vista High School, and helped lead them to be ranked #2 in the County in his lone year of playing high school soccer, instead spending his youth at the club level with the La Jolla Nomads playing in the U.S. Soccer Development Academy (USSDA). While playing for the Nomads, Schipper was called up to multiple youth national team camps and was selected to the national team pool for the United States U-17 men's national soccer team in November 2009.

From 2010 to 2014, he played college soccer at the University of Arizona for the Wildcats. During his time at college Schipper also played for USL PDL club FC Tucson during their 2011 season, and for Chula Vista FC in 2012 and 2013.

=== Professional ===
Schipper began his professional career in 2014, when he was invited to Mexico for trials with both Dorados de Sinaloa and Atlante FC, who both play in the Ascenso MX, but was released during pre-season without a contract.

=== Seattle Impact FC ===
On November 28, 2014, Schipper signed his first professional contract with the Seattle Impact of the Major Arena Soccer League for its inaugural season. In 6 games played during the 2014 season Schipper scored 3 goals on 9 shots. His goals came on 12/7/14 vs. Sacramento Surge on a 6–5 victory and scoring the game-winning goal. Schipper's other 2 goals came on 12/14/14 vs. Ontario Fury in a 13–10 defeat.

=== FC Force ===
He went on to play a season with FC Force in the National Premier Soccer League in 2014, that won the Southwest Conference in the West Region and reached the regional semifinals that season.

=== York Region Shooters ===
In April 2015, Schipper went on a trial with York Region Shooters of the Canadian Soccer League and after impressing the club, he signed a three-year deal. In 2015, the Shooters secured a postseason berth by finishing third in the standings with the second-best offensive record. The Shooters faced Burlington SC in the quarterfinals and advanced to the next round after a 4–2 victory. Their playoff journey came to a conclusion after losing 3–2 to Toronto Croatia in the semi-finals, who ended up winning the Canadian Soccer League championship final. At the end of the 2015 CSL season, Goiatuba Esporte Clube who play in the third division of the Campeonato Goiano announced that Schipper would join the club during the summer transfer window in July 2015 for 6 months. He then was invited into pre-season with Futebol Clube Cascavel in Brazil who play in the top flight of the Campeonato Paranaense and made a brief stint until suffering an injury.

Schipper returned to the Shooters in 2016 for the second year of his contract. The season marked another achievement for the York Region club as they captured their fifth regular season championship, thus establishing a CSL record for most regular season titles. They also achieved a team milestone by recording their best defensive record allowing only 10 goals all season, a record not matched since the Ottawa Wizards in the 2003 CPSL season. In their playoff run the Maple-based club defeated Milton SC 5–0 in the quarterfinals. In the semifinal the Shooters suffered a crushing 2–1 defeat in a penalty shootout to Hamilton City SC. He played 56 games and scored 17 goals through the 2017 season.

He played for Team USA at the 2017 Maccabiah Games in Israel.

=== Albatroz SC ===
Schipper opted out of his third and final year of contract with the Shooters to pursue a career playing overseas in Europe. He received offers from Örebro Syrianska IF of the Swedish Football Division 2 in the Södra Svealand region, Ibiza Sant Rafel FC of the Tercera División of Spain who play in Group XI in the Balearic Islands, and Albatroz SC of the Latvian Second League. On August 24, 2017, he agreed to terms with the Latvian Club who play in the Riga Region and debuted with the club on August 25 in a 0-0- draw with Ogre Regional Sports Center. On September 5, 2017, Schipper scored his first two goals in a 2–0 victory against Ogre Regional Sports Center. Albatroz SC finished the season as champions of their region and was awarded the Rigas Futbola Cempionats. At the end of the season, Schipper joined FK Jūrnieks of the Second League for friendly games vs Latvian Higher League opponents FK Liepāja, FK Ventspils, and FK Spartaks Jūrmala.

=== Southern United FC ===
On February 23, 2018, Schipper inked a two-year deal with New Zealand Football Championship side Southern United FC. He immediately got loaned out and joined Invercargill side Southland United for the winter league who compete in the FootballSouth Premier League. His first goal for the club came on March 24, 2018, in a friendly match, a 3–1 victory over Caversham AFC. Southland United secured themselves a top 3 finish in the FootballSouth Premier League with a 5-1-2 record after 9 rounds of play which confirmed their qualification spot in the newly formed South Island League which features eight teams, the top 3 teams from FootballSouth Premier League and the top 5 teams from Mainland Premier League to compete in one full round of games.

== Honors ==
=== FC Force ===
- National Premier Soccer League Southwest Conference Champions: 2014

=== York Region Shooters ===
- Canadian Soccer League First Division: 2016

=== Albatroz SC ===
- Latvian Second League Rīgas Futbola Čempionāts: 2017

== See also ==
- List of select Jewish association football (soccer) players
