= 1959 Chatham Cup =

Tournament details
- Venue(s): Basin Reserve, Wellington
- Dates: 22 August 1959

Final positions
- Champions: Northern (1st title)
- Runners-up: North Shore United

The 1959 Chatham Cup was the 32nd annual version of the Chatham Cup, a nationwide knockout football competition in New Zealand. The competition was run on a regional basis, with regional associations each holding separate qualifying rounds. Teams taking part in the final rounds are known to have included North Shore United, Rangers (Bay of Plenty), Hamilton Wanderers, Eastern Union (Gisborne), Moturoa (New Plymouth), Colenso Athletic (Hawkes Bay), Wanganui Athletic, Massey College (Manawatu), Miramar Rangers, Nelson Rangers, Western (Christchurch), Northern (Dunedin), Brigadiers (Invercargill).

== The 1959 final ==
Northern became the first Chatham Cup winners from Otago since Seacliff won the first final in 1923, winning the cup for the first time in their sixth final. Northern goalkeeper Jim Stephenson was playing in his fourth final for the club; he was to play in two more in 1961 and 1962, to become the first player to play in six finals. The game had a frantic start, with a goal coming for each side in the opening five minutes. Cliff Schmidt turned the ball into his own net to give the lead to Northern after just two minutes. The lead was only to last for some 90 seconds, with Alex Middleton heading the ball into the Dunedin side's net. Goals either side of the half-time interval from Bill Berry and George Little gave Northern a 3–1 lead. Chris Foulkes reduced the deficit late on, but despite strong pressure from the Aucklanders Northern held on to win the match by the odd goal in five.

== Results ==
=== Quarter-finals (Island semi-finals) ===
25 July 1959

Miramar Rangers	3 – 2	Moturoa
J. Davis, W. Lisk, P. Taylor	Report	R. Hutton, H. Speck

Basin Reserve, Wellington
25 July 1959

North Shore United	2 – 1	Eastern Union
Patterson ×2	Report	Gillies

Blandford Park, Auckland
11 July 1959

Western	6 – 1	Nelson Rangers
Feenstra, Saunderson ×2, Steele, Whitehead ×2	Report	G. Newell

English Park, Christchurch
18 July 1959

Brigadiers	1 – 2	Northern
J. Durst	Report	Little Bros. ×2

Surrey Park, Invercargill

=== Semi-finals ===
8 August 1959

Northern	2 – 0	Western
Berry, G. Little	Report

The Oval, Dunedin
8 August 1959

North Shore United	3 - 2 aet	Miramar Rangers
Patterson ×2, Middleton	Report	Davis, Taylor

Blandford Park, Auckland

=== Final ===
22 August 1959

Northern	3 – 2	North Shore United
Schmidt (og), Berry, G. Little	Report	Middleton, Foulkes

Basin Reserve, Wellington
Attendance: 7000
Referee: M.T. Swain
