= Jim Stephenson =

New Zealand footballer

Personal information
- Full name: James Stephenson
- Place of birth: New Zealand
- Position: Goalkeeper

Senior career*
Years	Team	Apps	(Gls)
1951–1957	Northern		

International career
1951–1952	New Zealand	10	(0)
- * Club domestic league appearances and goals

Jim Stephenson is a former footballer who played as a goalkeeper. He represented New Zealand at international level.

Stephenson made his full All Whites debut in a 0–2 loss to New Caledonia on 10 September 1951 and ended his international playing career with 10 A-international caps to his credit, his final cap an appearance in a 2–2 draw with Tahiti on 21 September 1952.

Stephenson appeared in six Chatham Cup finals for Northern between 1949 and 1962, gaining winners medals on his fourth and fifth attempts in 1959 and 1961.
