= 1961 Chatham Cup =

Tournament details
- Venue(s): Basin Reserve, Wellington
- Dates: 6 May – 26 August 1961

Final positions
- Champions: Northern (2nd title)
- Runners-up: North Shore United

The 1961 Chatham Cup was the 34th annual nationwide knockout football competition in New Zealand.

The competition was run on a regional basis, with regional associations each holding separate qualifying rounds.

Other teams known to have taken part in the final rounds included Otangarei United (Whangarei), Hamilton Technical Old Boys, Kahukura (Rotorua), Eastern Union (Gisborne), Moturoa (New Plymouth), Napier Rovers, Wanganui United, Kiwi United (Manawatu), Nelson Thistle and Timaru Thistle.

== The 1961 final ==
Northern won the cup for a second time, having previously been champions in 1959; North Shore United made their third consecutive finals appearance, having won the cup in 1960. The match was thus both a match between the two previous winners and also a rematch of the 1959 final, with the same team winning on both occasions. Seven Northern players and six North Shore players played in both finals, these six latter players - among them England and New Zealand international Ken Armstrong - also having played in the winning side of 1960. The final was a free flowing affair, but no goals came until the half hour mark, when Northern took the lead through George Little. The score remained 1–0 until two minutes from the end of the match, when Bruce Campbell doubled Northern's lead.

== Results ==
=== Second round ===
6 May 1961

Saint Kilda	7 – 3	Mosgiel
Durst ×3, Van Schraa 2 (1 pen.), Smolders, Stoove		Downie 2 (1 pen.), Thompson

Caledonian Ground, South Dunedin
Referee: D. Welham

=== Third round ===
27 May 1961

Caversham	3 – 2	Green Island
Hornby ×3		Hay ×2

Ellis Park, Dunedin
Referee: M. Laing
27 May 1961

King Edward TCOB	2 – 1	Saint Kilda
Paul ×2		Van Schraa

Caledonian Ground, South Dunedin
Referee: A. Williams
27 May 1961

Maori Hill	1 – 5	Northern
Roberts		G. Little ×3, Rae, P. Little

Culling Park, Dunedin
Referee: R. McDonald
27 May 1961

Roslyn-Wakari	5 – 3	Dunedin HSOB
Walker ×2, Smillie, Imman, Sanctuary		Morris (pen.), Cross, Hilliker

Tonga Park, Dunedin
Referee: D. Welham

=== Fourth round ===
17 June 1961

King Edward TCOB	1 – 0	Caversham
Cunningham

Caledonian Ground, South Dunedin
Referee: R.E. McDonald
17 June 1961

Northern	3 – 0	Roslyn-Wakari
Berry ×2, G. Little

Caledonian Ground, South Dunedin
Referee: W. Bamberry
17 June 1961

Invercargill Thistle	1 – 0	Waihopai
	Report

17 June 1961

Invercargill United	0–0 (a.e.t.) Rovers won on corners	Rovers
	Report

3 June 1961

Nelson Athletic	3-0	Nelson Rangers

?, Nelson
24 June 1961

Western	3-1	Nomads

English Park, Christchurch
17 June 1961

Napier Rovers	3-2	Kiwi United

Nelson Park, Napier
17 June 1961

Wanganui Settlers	2-3	Moturoa

Wembley Park, Wanganui
17 June 1961

Western Suburbs	5-4	Northern (Wellington)

Basin Reserve, Wellington
17 June 1961

Miramar Rangers	4-0	Wellington Marist

Basin Reserve, Wellington
17 June 1961

Otangarei United	1-8	Hamilton Technical Old Boys

Otangarei, Northland
17 June 1961

Eastern Union	6-4	Kahukura

Childers Road Reserve, Gisborne
27 May 1961

Mount Wellington	2-1	Mount Roskill

Blandford Park, Auckland
27 May 1961

North Shore United	6-2	Eastern Suburbs

Blandford Park, Auckland
- both Timaru Thistle (South Canterbury qualifiers) and Nelson Thistle (one of three Nelson clubs) effectively had byes to the next round

=== Fifth round ===
24 June 1961

Invercargill Thistle	4 – 0	Rovers (Invercargill)

Surrey Park, Invercargill
1 July 1961

Northern	1 - 0	King Edward TCOB

Caledonian Ground, South Dunedin
15 July 1961

Miramar Rangers	4-2	Western Suburbs

Basin Reserve, Wellington
8 July 1961

Napier Rovers	4-0	Moturoa
Henderson ×3, Wood

Nelson Park, Napier
1 July 1961

Hamilton Technical Old Boys	2-3	Eastern Union

Seddon Park, Hamilton
17 June 1961

North Shore United	2-1	Mt. Wellington

Epsom Showgrounds, Auckland
1 July 1961

Timaru Thistle	0-6	Western
	Report

Caledonian Ground, Timaru
17 June 1961

Nelson Thistle	1-0	Nelson Athletic
	Report

?, Nelson

=== Quarter-finals ===
15 July 1961

Invercargill Thistle	3 – 5	Northern
Steel ×2, Frost		G. Little ×2, McVey, Rae (pen.), Berry

Surrey Park, Invercargill
15 July 1961

North Shore United	3 – 2	Eastern Union

Blandford Park, Auckland
22 July 1961

Miramar Rangers	3 – 2	Napier Rovers

Basin Reserve, Wellington
22 July 1961

Western	6 – 2	Nelson Thistle
Newsome, Rodger, McKenna, Frost, Torkington, Durant (pen.)	Report	D. Watson ×2

Burwood Park, Christchurch
Referee: Mr. W. Bamberry

=== Semi-finals ("Island finals") ===
5 August 1961

Northern	3 – 1	Western
G. Little ×2, J. Little		Newsome

Caledonian Ground, South Dunedin
Referee: T. Griggs
5 August 1961

North Shore United	6 – 1	Miramar Rangers

Blandford Park, Auckland

=== Final ===
26 August 1961

Northern	2 – 0	North Shore United
G. Little, Campbell	Report

Basin Reserve, Wellington
Attendance: 7000
Referee: Mr. C. Anderson
