= John Dryden (footballer) =

New Zealand footballer

Personal information
- Full name: John Dryden
- Place of birth: New Zealand

Senior career*
Years	Team	Apps	(Gls)
- Northern AFC

International career
1923	New Zealand	1	(0)
- * Club domestic league appearances and goals

John Dryden was an association football player who represented New Zealand at international level.

Dryden made a single appearance in an official international for the All Whites in a 4–1 win over Australia on 30 June 1923.
