= Fergus Neil =

New Zealand footballer

Personal information
- Date of birth: 12 February 1992 (age 34)
- Place of birth: Queenstown, New Zealand
- Position: Defender

Senior career*
Years	Team	Apps	(Gls)
2009–2011	Hawke's Bay United	10	(0)
2011	Slough Town		
2011	Alresford Town		
2011–2014	Hawke's Bay United	39	(0)
2014	Kingston FC		
2014–2015	WaiBOP United	16	(2)
2015–2016	Team Wellington	16	(1)
2016–2017	Hawke's Bay United	18	(0)
2017–2019	Napier City Rovers		
2019–2021	Hawke's Bay United	26	(0)
2022–	Napier City Rovers	37	(2)
- * Club domestic league appearances and goals as of 16 March 2024

Fergus Neil (born February 12, 1992) is a New Zealand footballer who plays as a defender for National League club Napier City Rovers.

== Club career ==
=== Early career ===
Neil was a product of the youth systems of Napier City Rovers and Hawke's Bay United. In 2009, he was elevated to Hawke's Bay's senior team and competed in the New Zealand Football Championship for the 2009–10 season. In his debut season in the country's top-tier league, he appeared in 6 matches. In 2011, he ventured abroad where he had a brief stint in the lower English circuits with Slough Town and Alresford Town. Following his stint abroad, he returned to Hawke's Bay for the 2011–10 season. In 2013, he would miss the majority of the season, as he required surgery for a broken jaw.

=== Canada ===
In the summer of 2014, he played in the Canadian Soccer League with Kingston FC. Neil would help Kingston secure a playoff berth by finishing third in the league's first division. Ultimately, Kingston would reach the semifinal round where they were eliminated from the competition by Toronto Croatia.

=== New Zealand ===
After his spell abroad in the Canadian circuit, he returned to New Zealand to sign with league rivals WaiBOP United. In his debut season with the club, he appeared in 16 matches and scored 2 goals.

The next season he signed with another league rival Team Wellington. In his debut season with the club, he helped the club defeat Auckland City for the championship title. He also participated in the 2016 OFC Champions League, where he was featured in the tournament final against Auckland and was defeated. In total, he would play in 5 matches in the continental tournament.

=== Hawke's Bay ===
Neil would return to his former club Hawke's Bay in 2016. Following his stint in the country's top league, he left Hawke's Bay to play in the Central League with Napier City Rovers in 2017. In early 2019, Napier Rovers named him the team's captain. Throughout the 2019 season, he would help the Rovers claim the 2019 Chatham Cup.

In late 2019, he returned to the New Zealand first division with his former club Hawke's Bay. In his final season with Hawke's Bay, he served as the co-captain. He would appear in 12 matches. After the restructuring of the country's football system, he returned to the Central League in 2021 to his former club Napier City.

== Honors ==
Team Wellington

- New Zealand Football Championship: 2015–16

Napier City Rovers

- Chatham Cup: 2019
