= Lankford Smith =

New Zealand cricketer and footballer

- Smith in 1945

Personal information
- Full name: Lankford Daniel Smith
- Date of birth: 21 December 1914
- Place of birth: Ngaio, New Zealand
- Date of death: 1 November 1978 (aged 63)
- Place of death: Dunedin, New Zealand
- Position: Forward

Senior career*
Years	Team	Apps	(Gls)
- Dunedin High School Old Boys

International career
1948	New Zealand	2	(0)
- Cricket career
Cricket information
- Batting: Left-handed
- Bowling: Slow left-arm orthodox
- Role: All-rounder
Domestic team information
- Years: Team
- 1934/35–1956/57: Otago
Career statistics
Competition	First-class
Matches	61
Runs scored	2,281
Batting average	24.52
100s/50s	1/11
Top score	109
Balls bowled	7,274
Wickets	85
Bowling average	38.23
5 wickets in innings	1
10 wickets in match	0
Best bowling	5/52
Catches/stumpings	46/–
- Source: Cricinfo, 7 August 2022
- * Club domestic league appearances and goals

Lankford Daniel Smith (21 December 1914 – 1 November 1978) was an association football player who represented New Zealand at international level. He was also an accomplished cricketer, playing first-class cricket for Otago from 1935 to 1957.

== Life and career ==
Born in Ngaio, Wellington, Smith moved to Dunedin with his parents, Daniel and Annie Smith sometime prior to October 1925, where his father worked as a hospital orderly. He attended Otago Boys' High School in the city. He married Mavis Lucy Madigan in October 1937.

Smith played association football for the Dunedin club Northern, and played two official A-international matches for the New Zealand national football team in 1948, both against the visiting Australian team, the first a 0–7 loss on 28 August, followed by a 0–4 loss on 4 September.

A middle-order batsman and left-arm spinner, Smith captained Otago in 1945–46 and from 1947–48 to 1955–56, leading the province to victory in the Plunket Shield in 1947–48, 1950–51 and 1952–53. In 62 first-class matches he scored 2281 runs at 24.52, and took 85 wickets at 38.23. He scored his only century in the victory over Central Districts in Dunedin that gave Otago the 1952–53 shield. Dick Brittenden said that apart from his batting, bowling and "inspiring example in the field", "perhaps his greatest asset as a captain was his firm belief in the ability of his team. He was so deeply convinced it was the better side that it very often was."

After his playing career was over, Smith served as a Test selector, a role he also played for the Otago Cricket Association. He was also a radio cricket commentator, in partnership with Iain Gallaway, when major matches were played at the Carisbrook ground in Dunedin.

Smith worked as a schoolteacher. In December 1965 he rescued two boys who had got into difficulty in the sea near the mouth of the Waikouaiti River, and almost drowned himself while trying unsuccessfully to rescue a third. He, and the man who rescued him, were awarded the Royal Humane Society's bronze medal for bravery. He died at Dunedin in 1978 at the age of 63. Obituaries were published in the 1979 New Zealand Cricket Almanack and the 1980 Wisden Cricketers' Almanack.
