= Walter Brundell =

New Zealand footballer

Personal information
- Full name: Walter H Brundell
- Place of birth: New Zealand
- Position: Centre-half

Senior career*
Years	Team	Apps	(Gls)
- Northern AFC

International career
1922	New Zealand	2	(0)
- * Club domestic league appearances and goals

Walter Brundell was an association football player who represented New Zealand, playing in New Zealand's first ever official international.

Brundell made his full All Whites debut in New Zealand's inaugural A-international fixture, beating Australia 3–1 on 17 June 1922. Brundell made only one other international appearance, in New Zealand's second match, a 1–1 draw with Australia on 24 June 1923.
