= Jim Middleton (footballer) =

New Zealand footballer

Personal information
- Full name: C James Middleton
- Place of birth: New Zealand

Senior career*
| Years | Team | Apps | (Gls) |
- King Edward Technical College OB
- Eastern Suburbs

International career
| 1960 | New Zealand | 2 | (0) |
- * Club domestic league appearances and goals

James Middleton is a former association football player who represented New Zealand at international level.

Middleton played two official A-international matches for the New Zealand in 1960, both against Pacific minnows Tahiti, the first a 5–1 win on 5 September, the second a 2–1 win on 12 September 1960.
