= Nelson Suburbs FC =

- Full name: Nelson Suburbs Football Club
- Nickname: Suburbs
- Founded: 1962
- Ground: Saxton Field, Nelson
- Coach: Ryan Stewart
- League: Southern League
- 2026: Southern League, 5th of 10
- Website: www.nelsonsuburbs.co.nz
Home colours	Away colours

Nelson Suburbs FC is a football club in Nelson, New Zealand. They compete in the Southern League.

They have won the Mainland Premier League three times. Nelson Suburbs FC has strong ties with the region's most successful football school Nelson College.

Nelson Suburbs FC manages teams for Seniors, Women, Juniors/Youth (ages 9 to 19), Fun Football (ages 7 to 8) and First Kicks (ages 4 to 6).

== Club history ==
In 1978 Nelson Suburbs FC joined Central League where it participated for eight years until 1985.

In 1996 Nelson Suburbs FC entered the National League.

In 1999 Nelson Suburbs FC entered the new South Island league.

In 2000, Nelson Suburbs FC entered the Mainland Premier League. It won the competition in 2004, 2005 and 2008.

In 2018, Nelson Suburbs FC entered the newly formed Southern Football League, comprising the five best finishers in the Mainland Premier League and the three best finishers in the Southern Premier League.

In 2019, Nelson Suburbs FC won the Southern Football League by one point over Mainland Premier League rivals Cashmere Technical Football Club.

In 2020, Nelson Suburbs FC launched the Nelson Suburbs Football Academy.

In national competition, Nelson Suburbs have yet to reach the final of the Chatham Cup; having reached the semi-finals in 2008, 2018, 2025 and 2026. All campaigns but 2025 ended with loses to eventual champions East Coast Bays 2–1 in 2008, Birkenhead United 2–0 in 2018 and Fencibles United 3–0 in 2026. The team spent one season in the national league in 2000, finishing seventh out of ten teams but withdrawing from the 2001 league for financial reasons.

In 2023, Nelson Suburbs FC entered the Women's South Island League and finished in sixth place in its inaugural season, before finishing sixth again in 2024 followed by seventh-place finishes in 2025 and 2026.

== Season by season record ==
2021– (National League)

Season	Southern League									National League									Chatham Cup	Top scorer	
Season	P	W	D	L	F	A	GD	Pts	Pos	P	W	D	L	F	A	GD	Pts	Pos	Chatham Cup	Name	Goals
2021	7	1	1	5	10	17	-7	4	7th	Did not qualify									R3	(New Zealand) James McPhie, (New Zealand) Jordan Yong	3
2022	18	10	3	5	40	35	+5	33	3rd	Did not qualify									R4	(New Zealand) Scott Wallace	7
2023	18	7	4	7	48	46	+2	25	6th	Did not qualify									R3	(New Zealand) Ben Polak, (New Zealand) Alex Ridsdale	8
2024	17	8	5	4	52	39	+13	29	4th	Did not qualify									R2	(United States) Trevin Myers	13
2025	18	9	3	6	42	27	+15	30	4th	Did not qualify									SF	(England) Lennon Whewell	11
2026	18	8	1	9	50	42	+8	25	5th	Did not qualify									SF	(United States) John Reynolds, (England) Lennon Whewell	11
