= Tahiti women's national under-20 football team =

Tahiti sports team

Tahiti women's U-20
- Nickname: Les Hine Taure'a
- Association: Tahitian Football Federation
- Confederation: OFC (Oceania)
- Head coach: (French Polynesia) Stéphanie Spielmann
- Top scorer: Tahia Tamarii (4)
- Home stadium: Stade Pater Te Hono Nui
- FIFA code: TAH
First colours	Second colours

World Cup
- Appearances: 0

OFC U-20 Women's Championship
- Appearances: 2 (first in 2019)
- Best result: Third Place (2019)

The Tahiti women's national under-20 football team is the highest women's youth team of women's football in French Polynesia and is controlled by the Fédération Tahitienne de Football. The team consists of a selection of players from French Polynesia, and not just Tahiti.

== History ==
The Tahiti women's under-20 football team had never competed at the OFC U-20 Women's Championship. However in 2019, they competed for the first time, finishing in 3rd place.

== OFC Championship Record ==
OFC U-20 Women's Championship
Year	Round	Pld	W	D	L	GF	GA	GD
(Tonga) 2002	Did not Participate							
(Papua New Guinea) 2004	Did not Participate							
(Samoa) 2006	Did not Participate							
(New Zealand) 2010	Did not Participate							
(New Zealand) 2012	Did not Participate							
(New Zealand) 2014	Did not Participate							
(Tonga) 2015	Did not Participate							
(New Zealand) 2017	Did not Participate							
(Cook Islands) 2019	3rd Place	5	3	0	2	21	7	+14
(Fiji) 2023	Quarter-finals	3	0	2	1	1	2	-1
Total	2/10	8	3	2	3	22	9	+13

== Current technical staff ==
Position	
Head coach	(French Polynesia) Stéphanie Spielmann
Assistant Coach	(French Polynesia) Ouane Civil
Goalkeeper Coach	(French Polynesia) Julien D'Hervilly
Head of Delegation	(French Polynesia) Turia Teai
Kit Manager	(French Polynesia) Poroni Turana
Fitness Trainer	(French Polynesia) Maihau Lo-Yat
Physiotherapist	(French Polynesia) Stephanie Boret
Team Doctor	(French Polynesia) Jessica Chang Soi

== Current squad ==
The following players were called up for the 2019 OFC U-19 Women's Championship from 30 August–12 September in Avarua, the Cook Islands.

Caps and goals updated as of 31 August 2019, after the game against American Samoa.

No.	Pos.	Player	Date of birth (age)	Caps	Goals	Club
1	GK	Corail Harry	19 October 2001 (age 24)	1	0	(Tahitian Football Federation) Tefana
20	GK	Hereura Chu	15 March 2003 (age 23)	0	0	(Tahitian Football Federation) Taha'a
2	DF	Temenava Fournier	7 August 2004 (age 21)	1	0	(Tahitian Football Federation) Jeunesse Marquisienne
4	DF	Babou Tepea	26 July 2002 (age 23)	1	2	(Tahitian Football Federation) Tefana
6	DF	Lokelani Hauata	6 July 2001 (age 24)	1	0	(Tahitian Football Federation) Tefana
8	DF	Merehau Iotua	24 April 2002 (age 24)	1	0	(Tahitian Football Federation) Tefana
13	DF	Ahuura Chin	27 January 2002 (age 24)	0	0	(Tahitian Football Federation) Dragon
14	DF	Hana Kimitete	11 June 2001 (age 24)	1	0	(Tahitian Football Federation) Tefana
15	DF	Mihitua Tihoni	4 November 2000 (age 25)	1	0	(Tahitian Football Federation) Papara
19	DF	Naniloa Maro	9 July 2003 (age 22)	0	0	(Tahitian Football Federation) Jeunes Tahitiens
5	MF	Julienne Naomi	28 June 2003 (age 22)	1	0	(Tahitian Football Federation) Jeunesse Marquisienne
7	MF	Kohai Mai	14 February 2004 (age 22)	1	0	(Tahitian Football Federation) Jeunes Tahitiens
10	MF	Tiarehinano Tekakioteragi	15 March 2003 (age 23)	1	0	(Tahitian Football Federation) Tefana
12	MF	Vahuariki Tufaunui	5 September 2002 (age 23)	1	0	(Tahitian Football Federation) Tefana
17	MF	Kiani Wong	4 November 2000 (age 25)	1	0	(French Football Federation) Vendenheim
9	FW	Tetia Mose	9 August 2004 (age 21)	1	1	(Tahitian Football Federation) Papara
11	FW	Tahia Tamarii	8 May 2001 (age 25)	1	4	(Tahitian Football Federation) Papara
18	FW	Christiane Tetavahi	12 January 2001 (age 25)	0	0	(Tahitian Football Federation) Tefana
