= Timaru Thistle =

Timaru Thistle AFC
- Full name: Timaru Thistle Association Football Club
- Nickname: Thistle
- Ground: Anzac Square, Timaru, New Zealand
- League: South Canterbury Division One
- 2026: South Canterbury Division One, 4th of 5
- Website: https://www.facebook.com/ThistleAFC/

Timaru Thistle is a soccer club in Timaru, New Zealand. The club competes in the South Canterbury Division One.

== Competed ==
- 1961 Chatham Cup
- 1962 Chatham Cup
- 1963 Chatham Cup
