= Jim Ferrier (footballer) =

Scottish-born New Zealand footballer

Personal information
- Full name: James M Ferrier
- Place of birth: Scotland

Senior career*
Years	Team	Apps	(Gls)
- Northern AFC

International career
1967	New Zealand	2	(1)
- * Club domestic league appearances and goals

James Ferrier is a former association football player who represented New Zealand at international level.

Ferrier Made two appearances in official A-internationals for New Zealand, the first in a 3–5 loss to Australia on 5 November 1967, followed by a substitute appearance in an 8–2 win over Malaysia on 16 November 1967, Ferrier scoring one of New Zealand's goals.
