= Rory O'Sullivan =

Australian rugby union player

- Born: Rory O'Sullivan; 25 July 1998 (age 28) Australia
- Height: 176 cm (5 ft 9 in)
- Weight: 83 kg (183 lb; 13 st 1 lb)

Rugby union career
Senior career
Years	Team	Apps	(Points)
2019–	Force	2	(0)
- Correct as of 15 June 2020
Super Rugby
Years	Team	Apps	(Points)
2020–	Force		
- Correct as of 15 June 2020

Rory O'Sullivan (born 25 July 1998 in Australia) is an Australian rugby union player who plays for the Force in Global Rapid Rugby and the Super Rugby AU competition. His original playing position is scrum-half. He was named in the Force squad for the Global Rapid Rugby competition in 2020.
