= Vanuatu women's national under-17 football team =

Vanuatu Women's U-17
- Association: Vanuatu Football Federation
- Confederation: OFC (Oceania)
- Head coach: Joel Rarua
- Top scorer: Annie Gere (2)
- Home stadium: Luganville Soccer City Stadium
- FIFA code: VAN
First colours	Second colours

First international
- Papua New Guinea 7–1 Vanuatu (Matavera, Cook Islands; 14 January 2016)

Biggest win
- Fiji 2–3 Vanuatu (Matavera, Cook Islands; 16 January 2016)

Biggest defeat
- Vanuatu 0–27 New Zealand (Pirae, Tahiti; 20 September 2023)

World Cup
- Appearances: 0

OFC U-17 Women's Championship
- Appearances: 2 (first in 2016)
- Best result: Group Stage (2016, 2023)

The Vanuatu women's national under-17 football team is the second highest women's youth team of women's football in Vanuatu and is controlled by the Vanuatu Football Federation.

== History ==
Vanuatu participated only one time so far in the OFC U-17 Women's Championship. That was in 2016. They lost two games, but won a game against Fiji. Either, two days earlier they already scored their first goal, in a 7–1 defeat against Papua New Guinea. The goal was scored by Annie Gere. She also was one of the goalscorers against Fiji which means that she is Vanuatu's top scorer with two goals.

=== OFC ===
The OFC Women's Under 17 Qualifying Tournament is a tournament held once every two years to decide the only qualification spot for Oceania Football Confederation (OFC) and representatives at the FIFA U-17 World Cup.

OFC U-17 Women's Championship
Year	Round	Pld	W	D	L	GF	GA
(New Zealand) 2010	Did not Participate						
(New Zealand) 2012	Did not Participate						
(Cook Islands) 2016	Group stage	3	1	0	2	5	14
(Samoa) 2017	Withdrew						
(French Polynesia) 2023	Group stage	3	0	0	3	4	40
(Fiji) 2024	Did not enter						
Total	2/6	6	1	0	5	9	54
