= John Rae (New Zealand footballer) =

New Zealand footballer

Personal information
- Full name: John Rae
- Place of birth: New Zealand

Senior career*
Years	Team	Apps	(Gls)
- Northern

International career
1962	New Zealand	1	(0)
- * Club domestic league appearances and goals

John Rae is a former football (soccer) player who represented New Zealand at international level.

Rae made a solitary official international appearance for New Zealand in a 4–2 win over New Caledonia on 4 June 1962.
