= Ryan Stewart (football manager) =

English football manager (born 1985)

Ryan Stewart (born 14 May 1985) is a Northern Irish football manager and former footballer who managed the Samoa national football team.

== Early life ==
Stewart has been nicknamed "Skippy".

== Career ==
Stewart managed the Samoa national football team.

== Style of play ==
Stewart mainly operated as an attacking midfielder.

== Personal life ==
Stewart was diagnosed with testicular cancer in 2016.
