= Northern AFC =

- Full name: Northern Association Football Club
- Nicknames: Northern, The Ravens
- Founded: 1888
- Ground: Caledonian Ground
- Coach: Arran Wilkinson
- League: Southern League
- 2026: Southern League, 6th of 10
Home colours	Away colours

Northern AFC is a football club based in the Dunedin North area of the city of Dunedin, New Zealand, within the Southern Football region of the New Zealand Football structure. The compete in the Southern League.

The club has 10 senior teams, from Men's and Women's Premiership teams, Men's Reserves, Men's Third and Fourth grade teams, a Men's over 35s and 45s in the masters grades, and a junior club with a large number of teams from 6th grade through to Youth grade, and U15 and U17 youth development teams. The club also has an U19 team who form to compete in end of season tournaments.

The club's home ground is the Caledonian Ground, with trainings and other teams playing at Logan Park Turf, the Gardens Ground (the site of the club's clubrooms), Chingford Park, and Forrester Park, all are in the north of Dunedin.

Founded in 1888, Northern is the oldest continually operating football club in the Southern Hemisphere.

== Club history ==
In 1888, two football clubs called Northern and Southern were formed in Dunedin. The Northern club played in Brown’s paddock in North Dunedin, while the Southern club played at Tahuna Park in South Dunedin. The Northern club is the one still operating today.

Prior to the formation of the Southern League competition in 1968, Northern was the winner of Dunedin’s top league 14 times. Northern is one of the more successful teams in Dunedin with eight Chatham Cup Final appearances. The club's proudest moments include 1959 and 1961, when they won the Chatham Cup, as well as the National Rothman Cup in 1962. Nineteen Northern players have represented New Zealand winning full international caps.

In response to low player numbers in 1972 the Senior club joined with Maori Hill FC in the interests of football in the Northern end of Dunedin, forming North End United. At junior level, both Maori Hill and Northern maintained their individual identities. In 1991 it was agreed that the Senior club would revert to its historic Northern name.

In 2013, the club celebrated its 125th Jubilee. As part of the celebrations the Men’s Premiership team played Green Island FC in the first club football match to be held under the roof at Dunedin's new covered Forsyth Barr Stadium.

Northern’s teams play in black and white striped shirts, black shorts and black socks, with orange and black as the official away kit colours.

== Recent seasons ==
Men's Southern Premiership, and Men's Southern Division One Fletcher Cup

Following a number of seasons where the club achieved limited success, and in particular some very heavy defeats in 2020, changes were made to the coaching and support staff ahead of the 2021 season. A change in approach resulted in recruiting promising local younger players, alongside experienced players like National League and Olympic representative goalkeeper Liam Little. Increased preparation and a hard work ethic resulted in improved performances and eventually results started to improve on the pitch. The Men's Southern Premiership team ended the 2021 season winning four games and drawing two games, including beating the 2020 reigning ODT Men's Southern Premiership winners Otago University AFC.

2022 saw the performances and results continue to improve. Again, young promising local players were recruited to the club, and were provided with positive environment to train, play, and develop. The Men's Southern Premiership team led the league for a long period in 2022, ending the season winning nine games and drawing four, and eventually finished in fourth place.

The steady progress made in 2022 continued into 2023 and despite some player movements in and out of the club, the Men's Premiership team continued to improve, ending the season in third place.

2023 was also a successful season for both Men's Southern Football Fletcher Cup and Men's Southern Football Division Two teams. The Fletcher Cup team finished runners-up in the league and played in the final of the Chinese Charity Cup, and the Southern Football Division Two team won the league.

In 2025 Northern continued their strong performances winning the Southern Premier League for the first time alongside their first trophy in 49 years. Alongside this they won all 16 matches in the league while also being promoted via the playoffs to the Southern League.

Women's ODT Southern Premiership

2022 saw the Women's Premiership team return to the ODT Women's Southern Premiership. The team finished sixth.

U-15 and U-17 Youth Development League Squads

Northern have an U-15 team in the Football South Regional Development League which is a top Youth league in the Southern region involving teams from Dunedin, South Canterbury, Central Otago/Lakes, and Southland. The U-17 team playing locally in the Dunedin competition. The club also has an U19 team who form to compete in end of season tournaments.

== Season by season record ==
2022–2025 (Southern Premiership)
2026– (Southern League)

Season	Southern League/Southern Premiership									National League									Chatham Cup	Top scorer	
Season	P	W	D	L	F	A	GD	Pts	Pos	P	W	D	L	F	A	GD	Pts	Pos	Chatham Cup	Name	Goals
2022	18	9	5	4	49	38	+11	32	4th	Not eligible to qualify									R3	(New Zealand) Tyler Muir	19
2023	18	8	6	4	38	23	+15	30	3rd	Not eligible to qualify									R1	(New Zealand) Rory Hibbert	10
2024	18	10	2	6	49	33	+16	32	3rd	Not eligible to qualify									R3	(New Zealand) Rory Hibbert	17
2025	16	15	1	0	71	11	+60	46	1st	Not eligible to qualify									R3	(New Zealand) Rory Hibbert	24
2026	16	7	2	9	22	38	−16	23	6th	Did not qualify									R4	(New Zealand) Alexander Dale	6

== Players ==
2025 ODT Men's Southern Premiership
No.	Pos.	Nation	Player
1	GK	NZ	Eli Urwin
2	Def	NZ	Luke Williams
3	Mid	GER	Janic Gorman
4	Mid	NZ	Zac Baird-Hodge
5	Def	NZ	Angus Brett
6	Def	NZ	Luka Mandich (C)
7	Mid	NZ	Sam Cosgrove
8	Mid	NZ	Cameron McPhail
9	Fwd	NZ	Toby Orchiston
10	Fwd	NZ	Rory Hibbert
11	Def	NZ	Amasio Jutel
12	Def	NZ	Louis Gray
13	Fwd	NZ	Alex Dale
14	Def	NZ	Asti Wallace
15	Fwd	NZ	Nick Treadwell
19	Mid	NZ	Isaac Simons

=== Notable former players ===
- Walter Brundell
- John Dryden
- Malcolm Ferguson
- Jim Ferrier
- William Kilgour
- Tom McCormack
- Duncan McVey
- Wally Meehan
- John Rae
- Lankford Smith
- Jim Stephenson
- Ivan Walsh

== Coaches and officials ==
Name	Role	Team
Arran Wilkinson	Coach	Men's Southern Premiership
Grace Teah	Coach	Women's Southern Premiership
Craig Wilkinson	Assistant Coach	Men's Southern Premiership
Wayne Henderson	Coach	Men's Fletcher Cup
Nick Currie	Manager	Men's Southern Premiership
Aaron Warrington	President	Committee
Sandy Gorman	President	Committee
Tony Galloway	Junior Delegate	Committee
Terry Hibbert	Senior Delegate	Committee
Moreton Dacombe-Bird	Club Captain	Committee

== Federation Awards ==
In 2023 Northern FC were nominated for five awards at the Southern Football Senior Awards evening:

Award	Name	Result
Sports Person of the Year (Male)	Matt Johnstone	Nominated
Young Male Player of the Year	Rory Hibbert	Nominated
Female Coach of the Year	Grace Teah	Nominated
Female Personality of the Year	Kirsten Pram	Nominated
Club President of the Year	Aaron Warrington and Kirsten Pram	Winner

Chatham Cup
Preceded by Seatoun	Winner; 1959 Chatham Cup	Succeeded by North Shore United
Preceded by North Shore United	Winner; 1961 Chatham Cup	Succeeded by Hamilton Technical Old Boys
