= Southland United =

- Full name: Southland United
- Founded: 1988
- Ground: ILT Football Turf, Invercargill, New Zealand
- League: Donald Gray Memorial Cup
- 2022: Donald Gray Memorial Cup, 5th of 5
Home colours

Southland United is an amateur association football club from Invercargill, New Zealand. They compete in the FootballSouth Premier League. Their home ground was the ILT Football Turf, Invercargill.
