= Government purpose reserve =

Type of protected area in New Zealand

A government purpose reserve is a type of New Zealand protected area. There are currently 215 recognised government purpose reserves in New Zealand.

Some of these reserves are important wetlands. Others are small pockets of land around lighthouses.

== North Island ==
=== Northland Region ===
- Awakino Government Purpose Wildlife Management Reserve
- Coates Memorial Church Reserve
- Hewlett Point Sand Islands Government Purpose Reserve
- Lake Taeore Wildlife Management Reserve
- Manganui River Government Purpose Wildlife Management Reserve
- Mangawhai Government Purpose Wildlife Refuge Reserve
- Mangonuiowae Government Purpose Wildlife Management Reserve
- Marsden Spit Government Purpose Wildlife Management Reserve
- Matapouri Estuary Government Purpose Wildlife Management Reserve
- Ngunguru Government Purpose Wildlife Management Reserve
- Omamari Government Purpose Wildlife Management Reserve
- Omatai Government Purpose Wildlife Management Reserve
- Opuawhanga Government Purpose Wildlife Refuge Reserve
- Otaika Valley Government Purpose Wildlife Management Reserve
- Otakairangi Swamp Government Purpose Wildlife Management Reserve
- Paerata Government Purpose Wildlife Refuge Reserve
- Paranui Stream Government Purpose Wildlife Management Reserve
- Punahaere Government Purpose Wildlife Management Reserve
- Takahoa Government Purpose Wildlife Management Reserve
- Waipu Government Purpose Wildlife Refuge Reserve
- Wairua River (Government Purpose) Wildlife Management Reserve

=== Auckland Region ===
- Manukapua Government Purpose (Wildlife Management) Reserve
- Medlands Wildlife Management Reserve
- Oruawharo Creek Government Purpose Reserve
- Takahoa Government Purpose Wildlife Management Reserve
- Tapora Government Purpose (Wildlife Management)

=== Waikato Region ===
- Awaroa Swamp Wildlife Management Reserve
- Cowan Wildlife Refuge
- Flax Block Wildlife Management Reserve
- Hurrells Lake Wildlife Refuge Reserve
- Islands in the Waikato River Wildlife Management Reserve
- Kapenga Wildlife Management Reserve
- Kopuatai Wetland Management Reserve
- Lake Hakanoa Wildlife Refuge Reserve
- Lake Kimihia Wildlife Management Reserve
- Lake Kopuera Wildlife Refuge
- Lake Koromatua Wildlife Management Reserve
- Lake Ngapouri Wildlife Management Reserve
- Lake Ngarotoiti Wildlife Management Reserve
- Lake Okowhao Wildlife Management Reserve
- Lake Orotu Wildlife Management Reserve
- Lake Rotomanuka Wildlife Management Reserve
- Lake Rotongaro Wildlife Management Reserve
- Lake Rotopotaka Wildlife Management Reserve
- Lake Ruatuna Wildlife Management Reserve
- Lake Serpentine Wildlife Management Reserve
- Lake Tutaeinanga Wildlife Management Reserve
- Lake Waahi Wildlife Management Reserve
- Lake Waikare Wildlife Management Reserve
- Lake Whangape Wildlife Management Reserve
- Mapara Wildlife Management Reserve
- Matarangi Wildlife Habitat Reserve
- Matariki Wildlife Management Reserve
- Meyer Block Wildlife Refuge Reserve
- Miranda Taramaire Government Purpose Reserve Wildlife Management Area
- Opitonui River Mouth Wildlife Management Reserve
- Opuatia Swamp Wildlife Management Reserve
- Oruatua Reserve
- Patersons Lagoon Wildlife Management Reserve
- Patetonga Lake Wildlife Management Reserve
- Rotowaro Wildlife Management Reserve
- Takahoa Government Purpose Wildlife Management Reserve
- Te Mata Wildlife Management Reserve
- Torehape Wetland Management Reserve
- Waemaro Wildlife Management Reserve
- Waikite Wildlife Management Reserve
- Whangamarino Government Purpose Reserve
- Whangamarino Wetland Management Reserve

=== Bay of Plenty Region ===
- Athenree Wildlife Refuge Reserve
- Awaiti Wildlife Management Reserve
- Awakaponga Wildlife Management Reserve
- Bregman Wildlife Management Reserve
- Estuary Wildlife Management Reserve
- Fort Galatea Wildlife Management Reserve
- Jess Road Wildlife Management Reserve
- Karewa Island Wildlife Sanctuary
- Lake Tamurenui Government Purpose (Wildlife Management) Reserve
- Lower Kaituna Wildlife Management Reserve
- Maketu Wildlife Management Reserve
- Margaret Jackson Wildlife Management Reserve
- Matata Wildlife Refuge Reserve
- Matuku Wildlife Management Reserve
- Motunau (Plate) Island Wildlife Sanctuary
- Moutohora (Whale) Island Wildlife Management Reserve
- Ohope Spit Wildlife Refuge Reserve
- Okorero—Thornton Lagoon Wildlife Management Reserve
- Old Kaituna Riverbed Wildlife Management Reserve
- Orini Wildlife Management Reserve
- Piripai Wildlife Management Reserve
- Sulphur Point Wildlife Sanctuary Reserve
- Tarawera Cut Wildlife Management Reserve
- Thornton Lagoon Wildlife Management Reserve
- Whangakopikopiko (Wildlife Refuge) Reserve

=== Gisborne District ===
- East Island/Whangaokena Wildlife Management Reserve
- Mata Whero Wildlife Management Reserve
- Matawhero Wildlife Reserve Depot
- Te Puia Springs Reserve

=== Hawke's Bay Region ===
- Ngamotu Lagoon Wildlife Management Reserve
- Tutaekuri Climatic Reserve

=== Taranaki Region ===
- Ihupuku Swamp Wildlife Management Reserve
- Mahoe Growth and Preservation of Timber Reserve
- Mangahinau Esplanade Reserve
- Takahoa Government Purpose Wildlife Management Reserve

=== Manawatū-Whanganui Region ===
- Hautapu River Soil Conservation Reserve
- Lake Kohata Wildlife Management Reserve
- Makerua Swamp Wildlife Management Reserve
- Pitangi Reserve
- Pukaha / Mount Bruce National Wildlife Centre Reserve

=== Wellington Region ===
- Allsops Bay Wildlife Reserve
- Government House Reserve
- Horokiri Wildlife Management Reserve
- Lake Kohangatera Wildlife Reserve
- MacKays Crossing Wildlife Reserve
- Matthews & Boggy Pond Wildlife Reserve
- Pauatahanui Wildlife Reserve
- Ruamahanga Cutoff Wildlife Reserve
- Turners Lagoon Wildlife Reserve
- Turner Wildlife Reserve

== South Island ==
=== Tasman District ===
- Neiman Creek Wildlife Reserve
- Westhaven (Whanganui Inlet) Wildlife Management Reserve

=== Marlborough District ===
- Para Swamp Wildlife Reserve
- Tory Channel Leading Lights Reserve
- Wairau Lagoons Wetland Management Reserve
- Waitaria Bay School Reserve

=== West Coast Region ===
- Back Creek Swamp Wildlife Management Reserve
- Buller River Quarantine Reserve
- Coal Creek Wildlife Management Reserve
- Gillows Dam Wildlife Management Reserve
- Kongahu Swamp Wildlife Management Reserve
- Lake Haupiri Wildlife Management Reserve
- Lake Ryan Wildlife Refuge Reserve
- Mumu Creek Wetland Wildlife Management Reserve
- Nile River Wharf Reserve
- Okarito Lagoon Wildlife Management Reserve
- Otumahana Reserve
- Paroa Wildlife Management Reserve
- Paynes Gully Wildlife Management Reserve
- Rotokino Wildlife Management Reserve
- Shearers Swamp Wildlife Management Reserve
- Totara Lagoon Wildlife Management Reserve
- White Heron Lagoon Wildlife Management Reserve

=== Canterbury Region ===
- Ben Omar Wetland Government Purpose Reserve
- Black Point Government Purpose Reserve Wildlife Management
- Cass River Delta Government Purpose Reserve Wildlife Management
- Coopers Lagoon Government Purpose Reserve Wildlife Management
- Corner Knob And Goldney Hill Government Purpose Reserve
- Coutts Island Wildlife Sanctuary
- Cruickshanks Pond Government Purpose Reserve Wildlife Management
- German Creek Wildlife Management Reserve
- Godley Head Farm Park Reserve
- Harts Creek Wildlife Management Reserve
- Hawdon Flats Government Purpose Reserve
- Kowai River Government Purpose Reserve
- Lake Clearwater Government Purpose Reserve
- Lake Emma Government Purpose Reserve
- Lake Rotorua Wildlife Reserve - Government Purpose
- Lakeside Wildlife Management Reserve
- Morven Government Purpose Reserve General Government Buildings
- Motukarara Nursery Reserve
- Normanby Wetland Wildlife Management Reserve
- North Kowai River Government Purpose Reserve Railway Conservation
- Opihi River Government Purpose Reserve Railway Conservation
- Otukaikino Government Purpose Reserve Wildlife Management
- Otumatu Rocks Wildlife Reserve - Government Purpose
- Pohatu Government Purpose Reserve Wildlife Refuge
- Rakaia Riverbed Government Purpose Reserve Railway Purposes
- Selwyn Wildlife Management Reserve
- Waihao Box Government Purpose Reserve Wildlife Management
- Waitohi River Government Purpose Reserve Wildlife Management
- Wards Government Purpose Reserve Wildlife Management
- Washdyke Lagoon Government Purpose Reserve Wildlife Management
- Washdyke Lagoon Wildlife Refuge
- Williams Government Purpose Reserve Wildlife Management
- Yarrs Flat Wildlife Reserve

=== Otago Region ===
- Allans Beach Wildlife Management Reserve
- Allanton Wildlife Management Reserve
- Buckhams Brewery Site
- Butterfields Wildlife Management Area
- Camp Armstrong
- Canadian Flats Wildlife Management Reserve
- Cape Wanbrow Lighthouse Reserve
- Diamond Lake and Lake Reid Wildlife Management Reserve
- Eden Creek Wildlife Management Area
- Glendhu Wetland Government Purpose (Wildlife Management) Reserve
- Glenorchy Lagoon Wildlife Management Reserve
- Hall Road Wetlands
- Inch Clutha Wildlife Management Reserve
- Katiki Point Wildlife Management Reserve
- Kingston Railway/Foreshore Reserve
- Kinvara Track
- Lake Waihola-Gillanders Wildlife Management Reserve
- Lake Waihola Wildlife Management Reserve
- Lake Waipori Wildlife Management Reserve
- Little Hoopers Inlet Wildlife Management Reserve
- Matakitaki Wetland Reserve
- McKays Triangle Wildlife Management Reserve
- Merton Arm Wildlife Management Reserve
- Nugget Point Lighthouse Reserve
- Puerua Wildlife Management Reserve
- Sawmill Wildlife Management Area
- Serpentine Wildlife Management Reserve
- Shepherds Hut and Stony Creek Wildlife Management Reserve
- Taieri River Wildlife Management Reserve
- Tomahawk Lagoon Wildlife Management Reserve
- Tuckers Beach Wildlife Management Reserve
- Waipori/Waihola Wildlife Management Reserve

=== Southland Region ===
- Dipton Bush Reserve
- Dog Island Lighthouse Government Purpose Reserve
- Drummond Swamp Wildlife Management Reserve
- Home Creek Wildlife Management Reserve
- Kakapo Swamp Wildlife Management Reserve
- Lake George Wildlife Management Reserve
- Makarewa Wildlife Lagoon Wildlife Management Reserve
- Orepuki Wildlife Reserve
- Rabbit Island Quarantine Reserve
- Snowdon Lagoon Wildlife Management Reserve
- Tiwai Rocks Wildlife Management Reserve
