= Yarrs Flat Wildlife Reserve =

Wildlife reserve in New Zealand

- Ararira Wetland
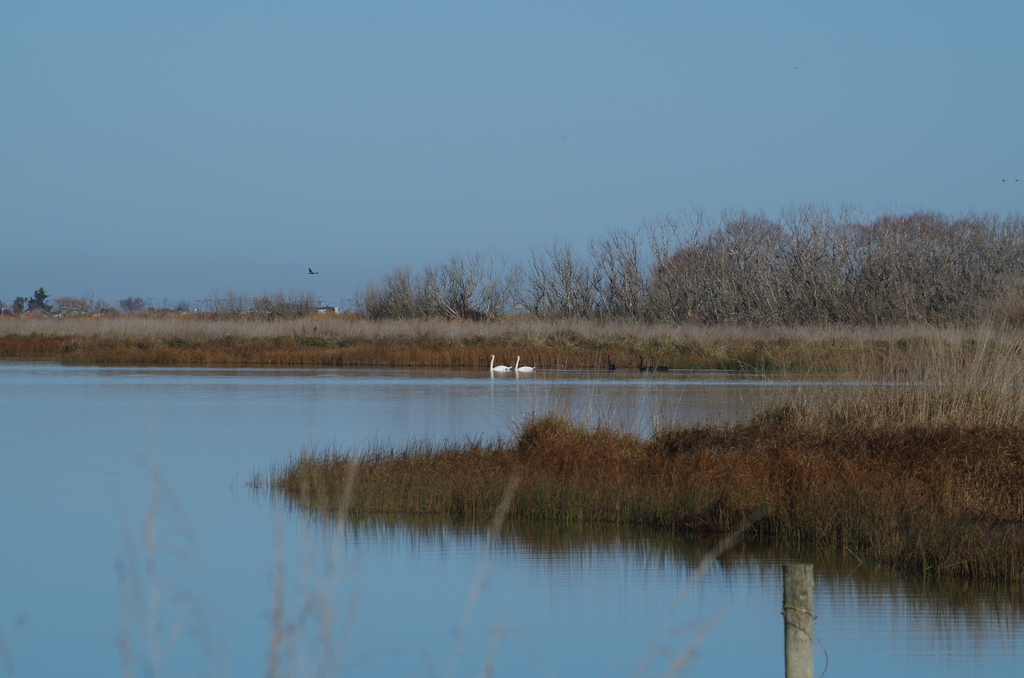
- Black swans, mute swans, and a harrier hawk in the reserve in 2020
- Interactive map of Yarrs Flat Wildlife Reserve
- Type: Government purpose reserve
- Location: Canterbury Region, New Zealand
- Nearest town: Selwyn, New Zealand
- Area: 286 hectares (710 acres)
- Established: 1980
- Manager: Department of Conservation and Te Rūnanga o Ngāi Tahu

The Yarrs Flat Wildlife Reserve, also known as the Ararira Wetland, is a government purpose reserve on Lake Ellesmere / Te Waihora in Canterbury, New Zealand. It is jointly managed by the New Zealand Department of Conservation and the Te Rūnanga o Ngāi Tahu. During the 1980s, Yarrs Flat had some of the highest bird diversity in New Zealand, with seventy-five different species of birds observable in its 286 hectares (1.10 sq mi) area. As of the early twenty-first century, the flat provides a habitat for many native species of New Zealand, such as the Australasian bittern, curlew sandpiper, and red-necked stint. Today, it is an important nesting site for Australasian bitterns and is one of the few remaining areas of freshwater swamplands around Lake Ellesmere / Te Waihora.

During the twentieth century, it was used as a pasture for dairy cows. This, combined with slash-and-burn agricultural techniques and the introduction of non-native or invasive species, caused extensive damage to native vegetation. The high salt content in the soil, and the marshy land making some areas inaccessible to cattle, helped to preserve many species of plants when compared to the rest of Lake Ellesmere / Te Waihora. Cattle grazing was stopped in 2010, and a variety of projects were initiated to help the area recover its biodiversity. These have involved re-planting damaged area, weed-killing programs, and predator trapping programs.

The flat is accessible to the public. Members of the public are allowed to go hiking and four-wheeling in the park, although barriers have been erected to limit vehicle traffic in the reserve itself.

== Geology ==
Yarrs Flat is a 286 hectares (710 acres) flat located on the northern edge of Lake Ellesmere / Te Waihora, in between the L II River and Greenpark Sands Conservation Area. It very low in elevation, and unprotected from winds. On the eastern slope of the reserve, the soil is high in salt with land plants. On the western half, the land is uneven and has been partially modified by agriculture. It contains a pasture and a freshwater swamp, one of the few remaining areas of freshwater swampland around the lake. It is also one of the few swamps around the lake that retains water during droughts. Water is provided to the flat by a series of artesian bores.

The fact that the reserve contains both dry and marsh-like areas is distinctive. It is also divided by deep mudflats and is subject to flooding.

== Ecology ==
=== Birds ===
As of the 1980s, Yarrs Flat reserve had some of the highest bird diversity in New Zealand and was one of the best places in Lake Ellesmere / Te Waihora for waders. According to a 1987 report in the press, 75 different species of birds could be observed in the flat. A 1985 report on the birds inhabiting Lake Ellesmere / Te Waihora listed several species of both native and non-native birds, including golden plovers, sharp-tailed sandpipers, pectoral sandpipers, banded dotterals, curlew sandpipers, red-necked stints, black swans, grey teals, shovelers, Canada geese, paradise shelducks, grey ducks, mallards, and assorted herons, gulls, terns, and shags including royal spoon-bills, white herons, Australasian bitterns, black-billed gulls, little terns, and marsh crakes. The report highlighted the curlew sandpipers and red-necked stints, estimating that the populations found at Yarrs Flat "probably represent up to 60% of the New Zealand populations".

In 2016, native birds sighted at Yarrs Flat included New Zealand bellbirds, welcome swallows, spur-winged lapwing, sandpipers, pied stilts, harrier-hawks, and southern black-backed gulls. Non-native birds included chaffinches, greenfinches, hedge sparrows, house sparrows, Australian magpies, mallards, rock pigeons, starlings, and yellowhammers. It serves as a habitat and nesting site for rare birds such as the Australasian bittern (Botaurus poiciloptilus).

In the 1980s, the population of black swans (cygnus atratus) in Yarrs Flat ranged between 300 and 1000 individuals. In 2021, Yarrs Flat is had the third largest nesting colony of black swans in Lake Ellesmere / Te Waihoram, with 130 nests recorded. However, due to flooding and shrub-like vegetation, it is not as hospital to C. atratus as the nesting sites on Kaitorete Spit or in Ataahua and early nests are particularly prone to being damaged or destroyed.

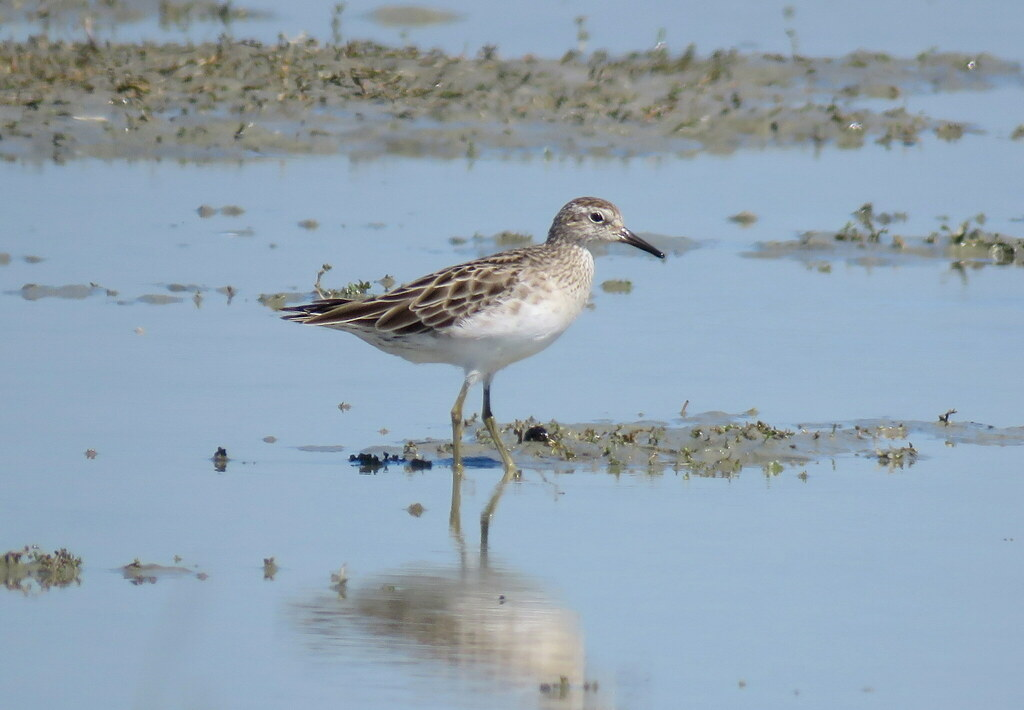
Sharp-tailed sandpiper

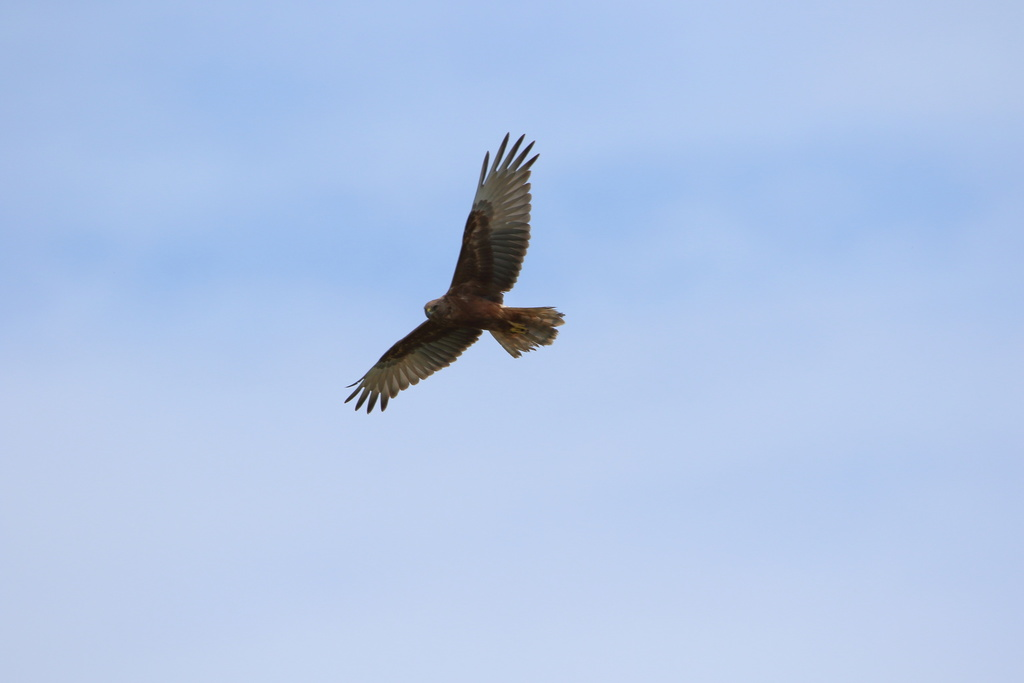
Swamp harrier

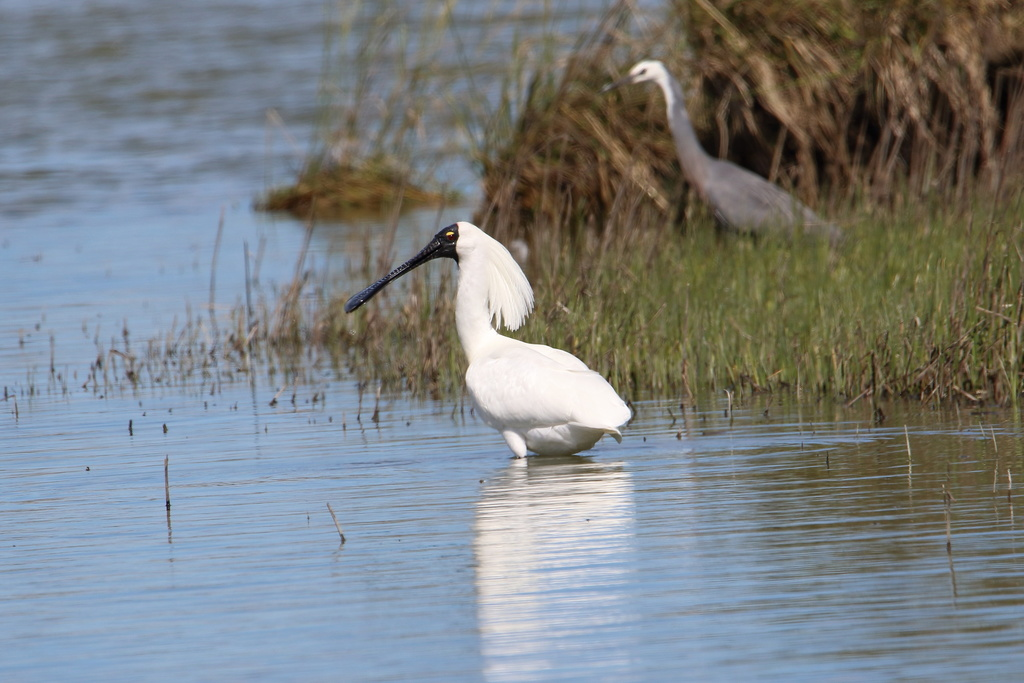
Royal spoonbill

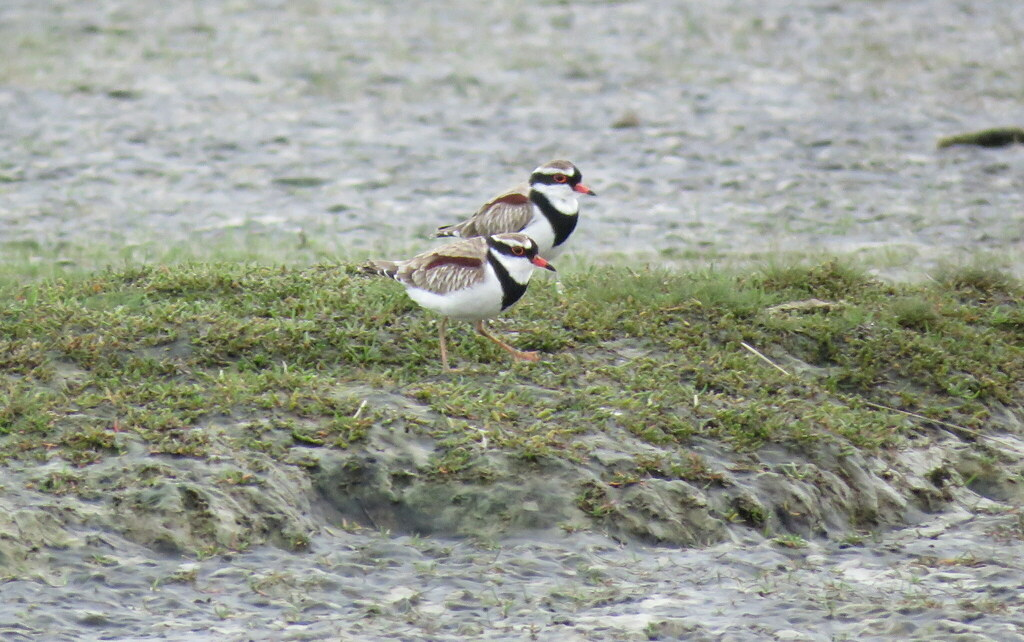
Black-fronted dotterels

=== Plants ===
The plant life of Yarrs Flat was also identified as "botanically important" during the 1980s, with the saltwater sections near Lake Ellesmere identified in particular as valuable. However, it was also damaged by a combination of human activities including the introduction of non-native and invasive species, grazing by farm animals, and draining and burning. Plants identified at the reserve during the 1980s included Selliera radicans, Juncus maritimus, Enneapogon nigricans, plant in the genus Salicornia and Mimulus, and various rushes, ribbonwood, and willows. Small amounts of Carex sectawere also present, although populations were confined to marshy and boggy areas that cattle and sheep could not access to graze. Today, the reserve is mostly home to Plagianthus divaricatus shrubs and Elymus repens grasses. Other native plants include Typha orientalis, Urtica linearifolia, Salicornia quinqueflora, Urtica perconfusa, and Carex secta. The few trees there are mostly non-native willows, especially Salix cinerea(which was absent from the site in 1984) and Salix × fragilis, but there is also a windbreak of non-native Pinus radiata still surrounding the site of a former hut. Other non-native or invasive plants include Phalaris arundinacea,Ulex europaeus, and Rubus fruticosus.

The non-native Plantago coronopus has replaced native New Zealand plants in the flat such as Samolus repens and Selliera radicans. The high salt content in the soil may have helped to preserve some species of native plants, however, leading to the area to have a higher number of native plants when compared to other reserves around the lake.

Semi-aquatic plants such as Thyridia repens and Triglochin striatum have been observed in mudflats.

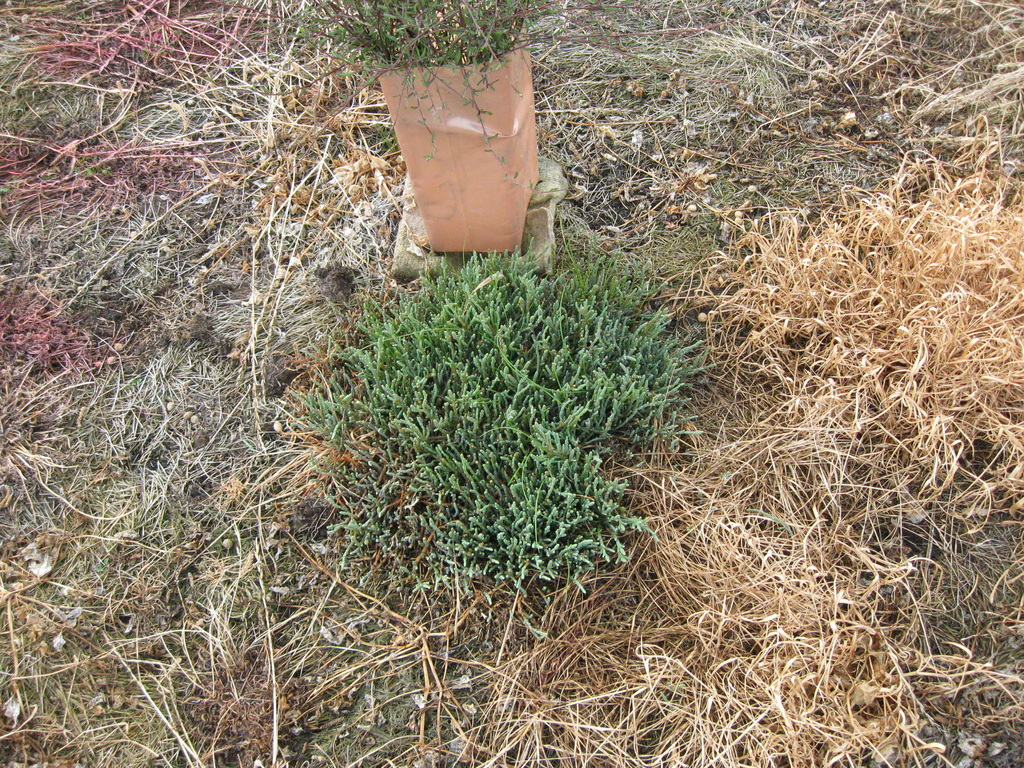
Salicornia quinqueflora

=== Invertebrates ===
There are several species of insects, both native and non-native, living in the Yarrs Flat reserve. A 2016 study of fauna living in Yarrs Flat discovered eight species of ground beetles, seven of which were native to New Zealand and the majority of which were near the L II River. The researchers also discovered giant willow aphids, Vanessa itea, Steriphus diversipes lineata, Steriphus variabilis, Listronotus bonariensis, Balaustium sp, nursery web spiders (Dolomedes minor), and sixty-three species of moths, including Meterana levis and Ectopatria aspera.

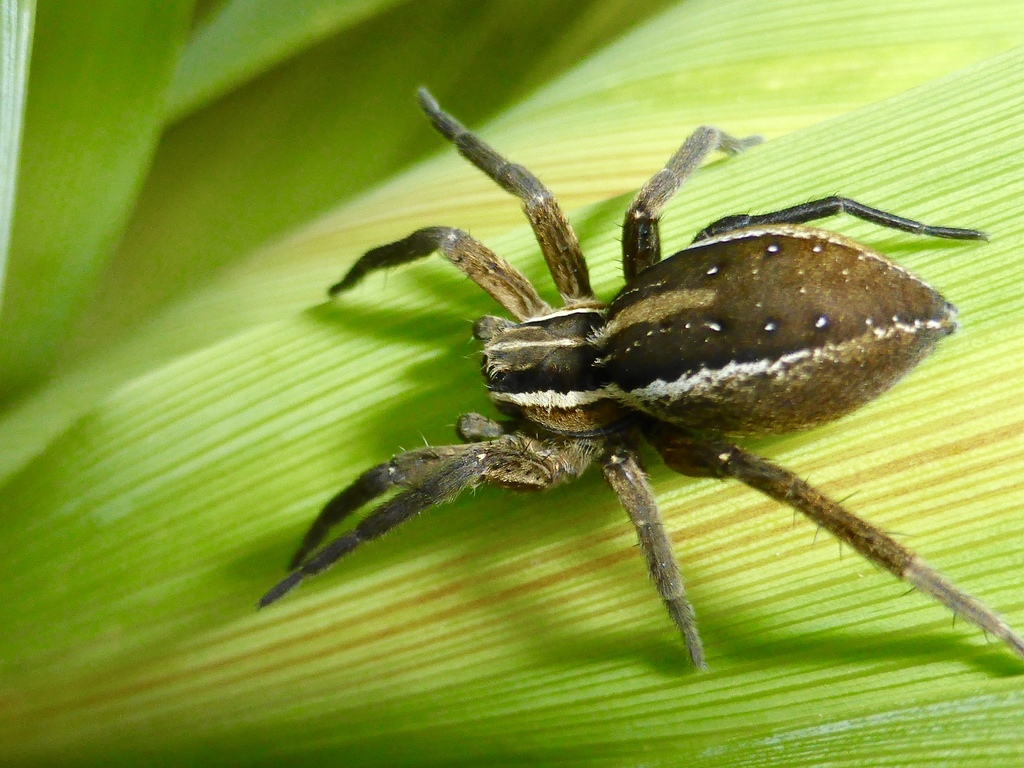
Nursery web spider

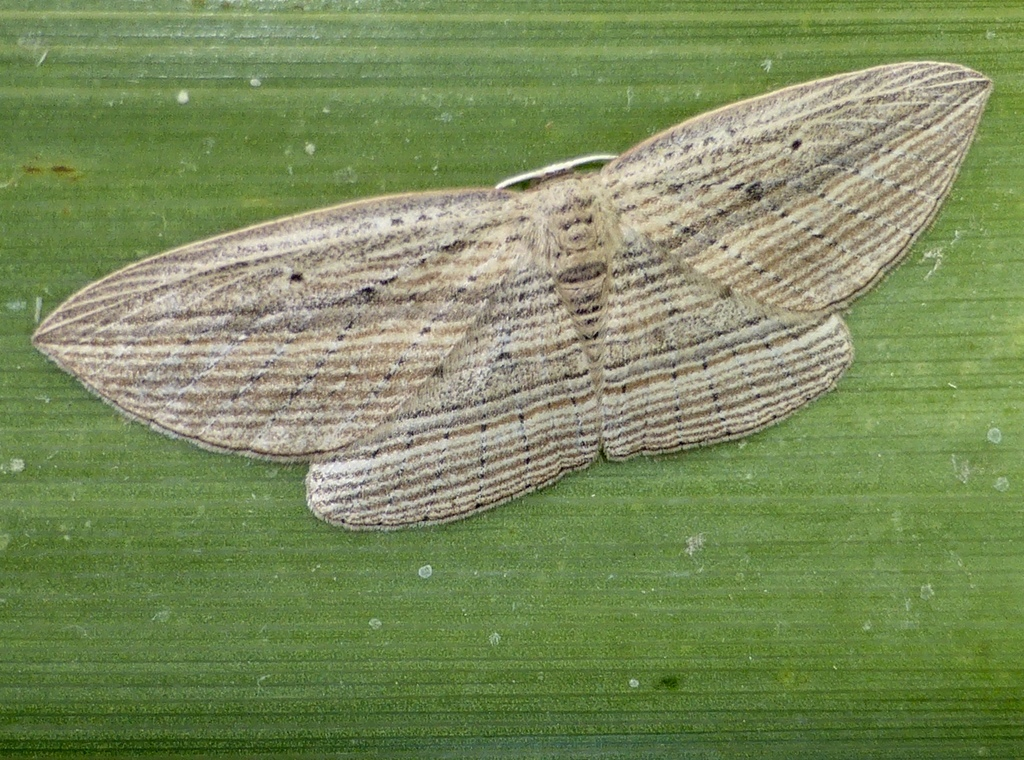
Epiphryne verriculata on Cordyline australis

=== Animals ===
There is a population of skinks (Oligosoma nigriplantare polychroma) living in the reserve. Non-native mammals sighted at the reserve in 2016 include rats, hedgehogs, mice, possums, and mustelids.

== History ==
Yarrs Flat Wildlife Reserve was designated a government purpose reserve in 1980. Plans were created in 1987 to add a nature trail and hides to the park for public use. During the 1980s, like many New Zealand marshland, it was re-purposed to as pasture to graze for dairy cows. Concerns where raised in government reports as to whether the grazing was causing damage to native flora and a 1985 survey of flora and fauna in the lake came to the conclusion that cattle grazing, alongside agricultural techniques such as slash-and-burning the land and draining the swamp, had damaged vegetation. Cattle grazing continued to be performed under a license until 2010. In 2013, New Zealand dairy company Fonterra and the Department of Conservation signed an agreement to found an organization, Living Water, help improve biodiversity on former cattle grazing sites, including Yarrs Flat.

== Human activities ==
The reserve is managed the by the Department of Conservation and the Te Rūnanga o Ngāi Tahu, the governing body of the Ngāi Tahu.

Hunting birds and birdwatching are popular activities at Yarrs Flat. People are also allowed to hike and go four wheeling in the reserve.

=== Conservation efforts ===
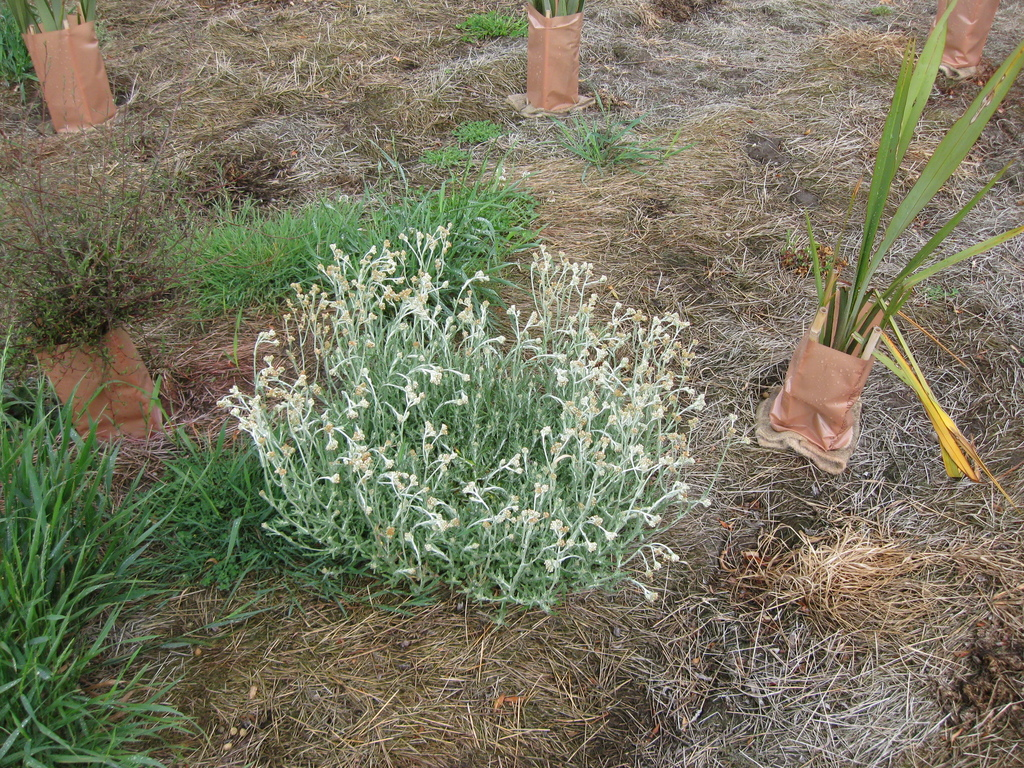
Pseudognaphalium luteoalbum amongst recently planted trees in 2017

In 2019, the Waihora Ellesmere Trust (WET) and the Department of Conservation announced plans to start a predator-trapping program. The program was designed to monitor, trap, and kill non-native rodents and mustelids such as rats, mice, weasels, stoats, and ferrets. In addition, the project also was meant to target possums. The Selwyn District Council and Living Water have confirmed that a predator-control program is operating at Yarrs Flat Wildlife Reserve. Conservation efforts have also attempted to exterminate non-native plants, especially Salix cinerea. Some of this extermination was done through the use of pesticides.

A 1988 Department of Scientific and Industrial Research vegetation report on the flat found that there was damage to Schoenoplectus pungens populations on the western parts of the flats, caused by grazing. The study was unable to determine whether the damage had been caused by farm animals or bird such as swans or Canada geese. The author of the report, Trevor Partridge, recommended that the grazing license be extended, but if the damage was being caused by the farm animals, to block their access to the western part of the reserve.

There have been several attempts by the Department of Conservation to re-plant areas of the reserve since 2015. These plantings have, at various times, been done by the public, students at Lincoln Primary School, and in connection with Lincoln University. As of 2019, 21,000 trees had been planted in the flats. By 2021, this had increased to 41,000 trees. The new trees were planted in an artificial, winding curve across the flats, meant to represent both the impact humans had on the local environment and their relationship in the future.

A 2016 study by ecologists at Lincoln University recommended cutting off road access, due to the damage cars had done to the reserve's insect habitats. Around 2020, extra barriers were installed in order to prevent vehicles from entering further into the park.

== Notes ==
1. Often written as Yarr's Flat Wildlife Reserve
