= Ectopatria plinthina =

Scientific classification
- Kingdom: Animalia
- Phylum: Arthropoda
- Class: Insecta
- Order: Lepidoptera
- Superfamily: Noctuoidea
- Family: Noctuidae
- Genus: Ectopatria
- Species: E. plinthina

Binomial name
- Ectopatria plinthina (Hampson, 1909)

Synonyms
- Omphaletis plinthina Hampson, 1909

Species of moth

Ectopatria plinthina is a moth of the family Noctuidae. It is found in Western Australia.
