= Ectopatria spilonata =

Scientific classification
- Domain: Eukaryota
- Kingdom: Animalia
- Phylum: Arthropoda
- Class: Insecta
- Order: Lepidoptera
- Superfamily: Noctuoidea
- Family: Noctuidae
- Genus: Ectopatria
- Species: E. spilonata

Binomial name
- Ectopatria spilonata (Lower, 1902)

Synonyms
- Agrotis spilonata Lower, 1902; Ectopatria spilomata Hampson, 1903

Species of moth

Ectopatria spilonata is a moth of the family Noctuidae. It is found in New South Wales and South Australia.

The larvae feed on Atriplex vesicaria.
