= Ectopatria umbrosa =

Scientific classification
- Kingdom: Animalia
- Phylum: Arthropoda
- Class: Insecta
- Order: Lepidoptera
- Superfamily: Noctuoidea
- Family: Noctuidae
- Genus: Ectopatria
- Species: E. umbrosa

Binomial name
- Ectopatria umbrosa Hampson, 1903

Species of moth

Ectopatria umbrosa is a moth of the family Noctuidae. It is found in Queensland.
