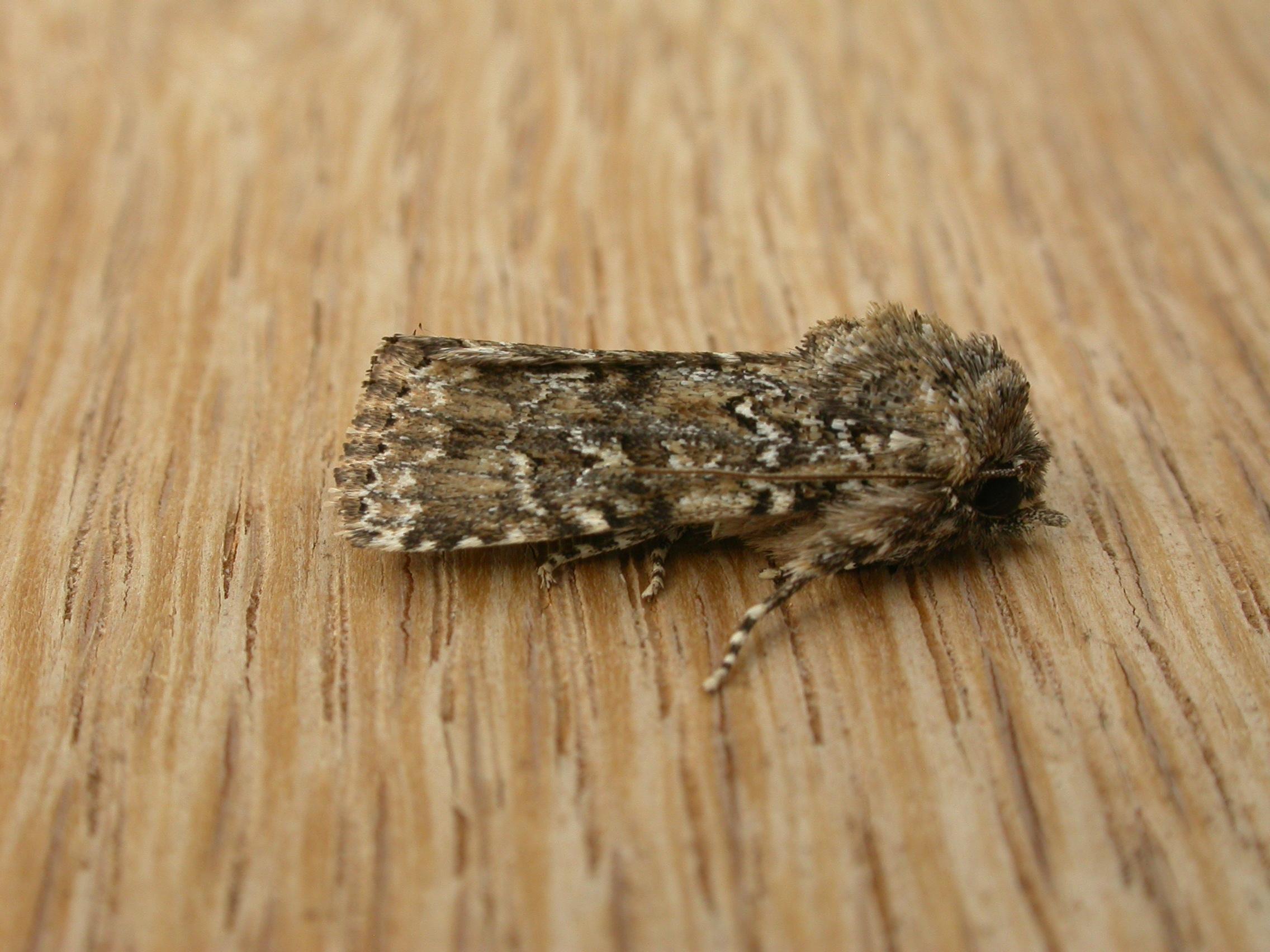

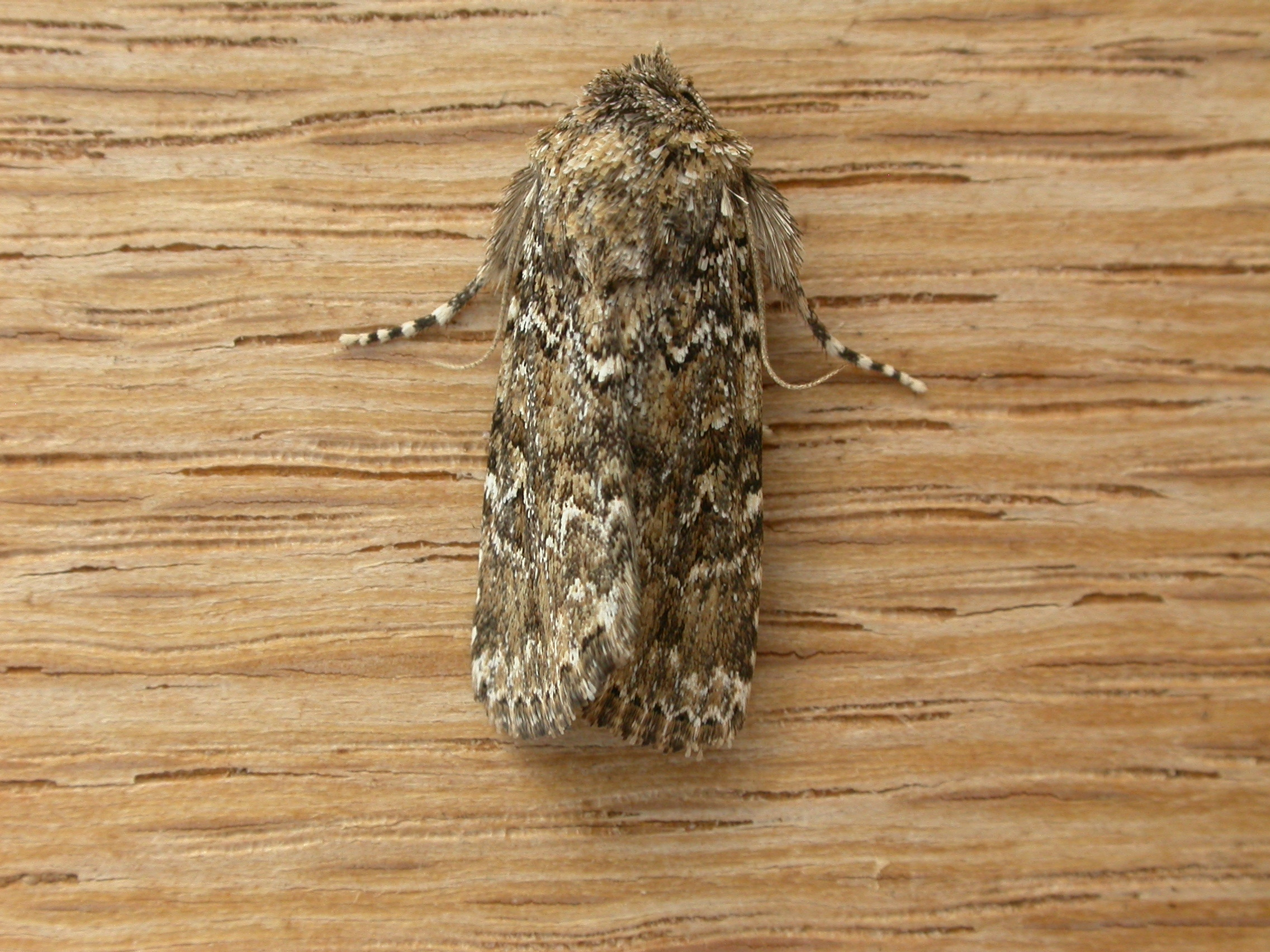

Scientific classification
- Kingdom: Animalia
- Phylum: Arthropoda
- Class: Insecta
- Order: Lepidoptera
- Superfamily: Noctuoidea
- Family: Noctuidae
- Genus: Ectopatria
- Species: E. subrufescens

Binomial name
- Ectopatria subrufescens (Walker, 1865)

Synonyms
- Agrotis subrufescens Walker, 1865

= Ectopatria subrufescens =

Species of moth

Ectopatria subrufescens is a moth of the family Noctuidae. It is found in South Australia, Victoria and Western Australia.

The wingspan is about 30 mm.

The larvae feed on Bromus unioloides.
