= Ectopatria clavigera =

Scientific classification
- Domain: Eukaryota
- Kingdom: Animalia
- Phylum: Arthropoda
- Class: Insecta
- Order: Lepidoptera
- Superfamily: Noctuoidea
- Family: Noctuidae
- Genus: Ectopatria
- Species: E. clavigera

Binomial name
- Ectopatria clavigera (Turner, 1943)

Synonyms
- Namangana clavigera Turner, 1943; Diplonephra clavigera (Turner, 1943)

Species of moth

Ectopatria clavigera is a moth of the family Noctuidae. It is found in Western Australia.
