= Ectopatria loxonephra =

Scientific classification
- Domain: Eukaryota
- Kingdom: Animalia
- Phylum: Arthropoda
- Class: Insecta
- Order: Lepidoptera
- Superfamily: Noctuoidea
- Family: Noctuidae
- Genus: Ectopatria
- Species: E. loxonephra

Binomial name
- Ectopatria loxonephra (Turner, 1944)

Synonyms
- Ariathisa loxonephra Turner, 1944

Species of moth

Ectopatria loxonephra is a moth of the family Noctuidae. It is found in South Australia and Western Australia.
