= Ectopatria euglypta =

Scientific classification
- Domain: Eukaryota
- Kingdom: Animalia
- Phylum: Arthropoda
- Class: Insecta
- Order: Lepidoptera
- Superfamily: Noctuoidea
- Family: Noctuidae
- Genus: Ectopatria
- Species: E. euglypta

Binomial name
- Ectopatria euglypta (Lower, 1908)

Synonyms
- Proteuxoa euglypta Lower, 1908

Species of moth

Ectopatria euglypta is a moth of the family Noctuidae. It is found in South Australia and Western Australia.
