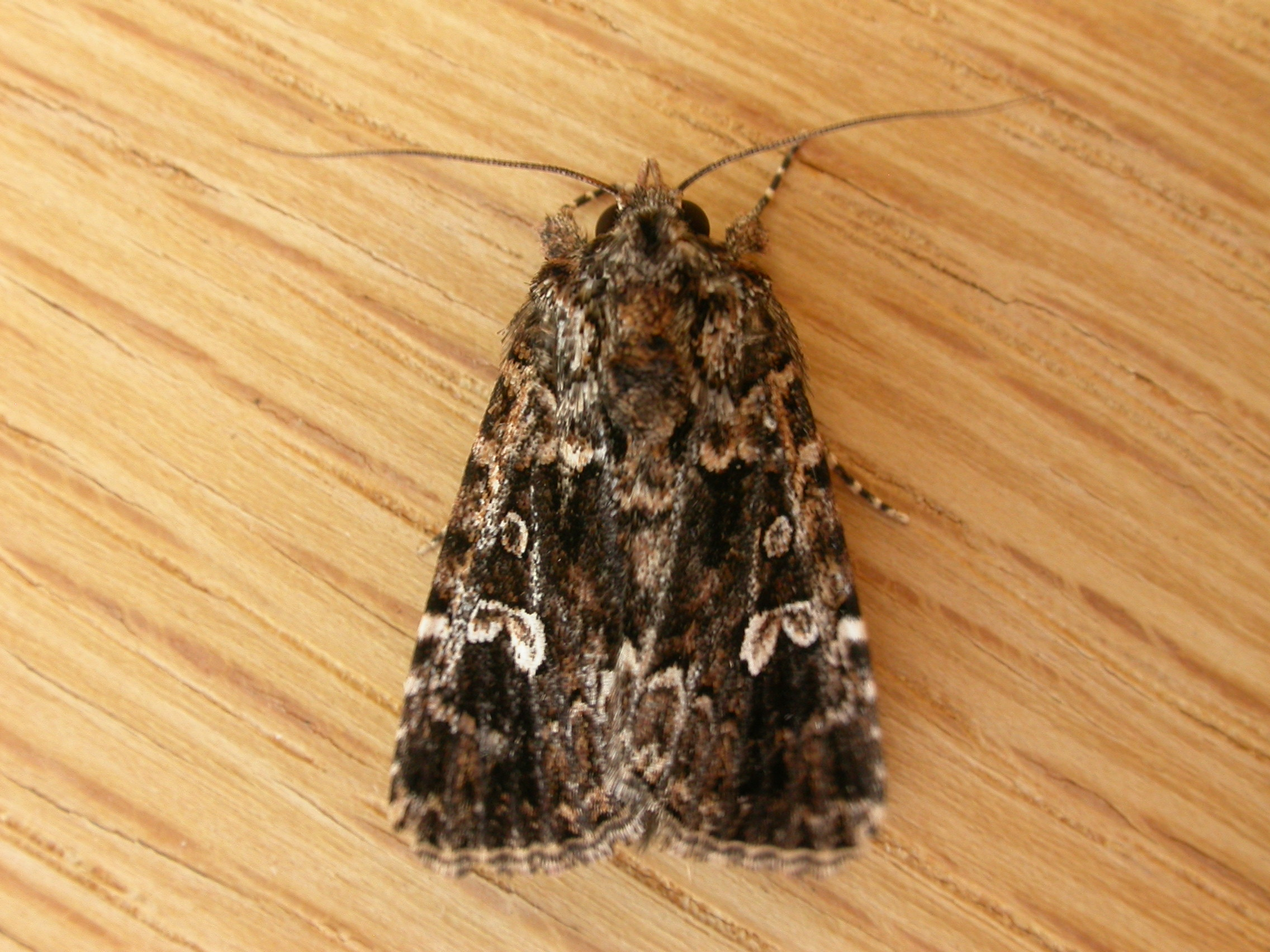
- Ectopatria horologa

Scientific classification
- Kingdom: Animalia
- Phylum: Arthropoda
- Class: Insecta
- Order: Lepidoptera
- Superfamily: Noctuoidea
- Family: Noctuidae
- Subfamily: Noctuinae
- Genus: Ectopatria; Hampson, 1903

Synonyms
- Propatria Hampson, 1903

= Ectopatria =

Genus of moths

Ectopatria is a genus of moths of the family Noctuidae. The genus was erected by George Hampson in 1903.

== Species ==
- Ectopatria aspera (Walker, 1857)
- Ectopatria clavigera (Turner, 1943)
- Ectopatria contrasta Strand, 1924
- Ectopatria deloptis (Lower, 1908)
- Ectopatria euglypta (Lower, 1908)
- Ectopatria horologa (Meyrick, 1897)
- Ectopatria loxonephra (Turner, 1944)
- Ectopatria mniodes (Lower, 1902)
- Ectopatria mundoides (Lower, 1893)
- Ectopatria neuroides (Swinhoe, 1901)
- Ectopatria ochroleuca (Lower, 1902)
- Ectopatria paurogramma (Lower, 1902)
- Ectopatria pelosticta (Lower, 1902)
- Ectopatria plinthina (Hampson, 1909)
- Ectopatria spilonata (Lower, 1902)
- Ectopatria subrufescens (Walker, 1865)
- Ectopatria umbrosa Hampson, 1903
- Ectopatria virginea Lower, 1905
- Ectopatria xerampelina (Turner, 1904)
