= Ectopatria ochroleuca =

Scientific classification
- Domain: Eukaryota
- Kingdom: Animalia
- Phylum: Arthropoda
- Class: Insecta
- Order: Lepidoptera
- Superfamily: Noctuoidea
- Family: Noctuidae
- Genus: Ectopatria
- Species: E. ochroleuca

Binomial name
- Ectopatria ochroleuca (Lower, 1902)

Synonyms
- Caradrina ochroleuca Lower, 1902

Species of moth

Ectopatria ochroleuca is a moth of the family Noctuidae. It is found in New South Wales and Western Australia.
