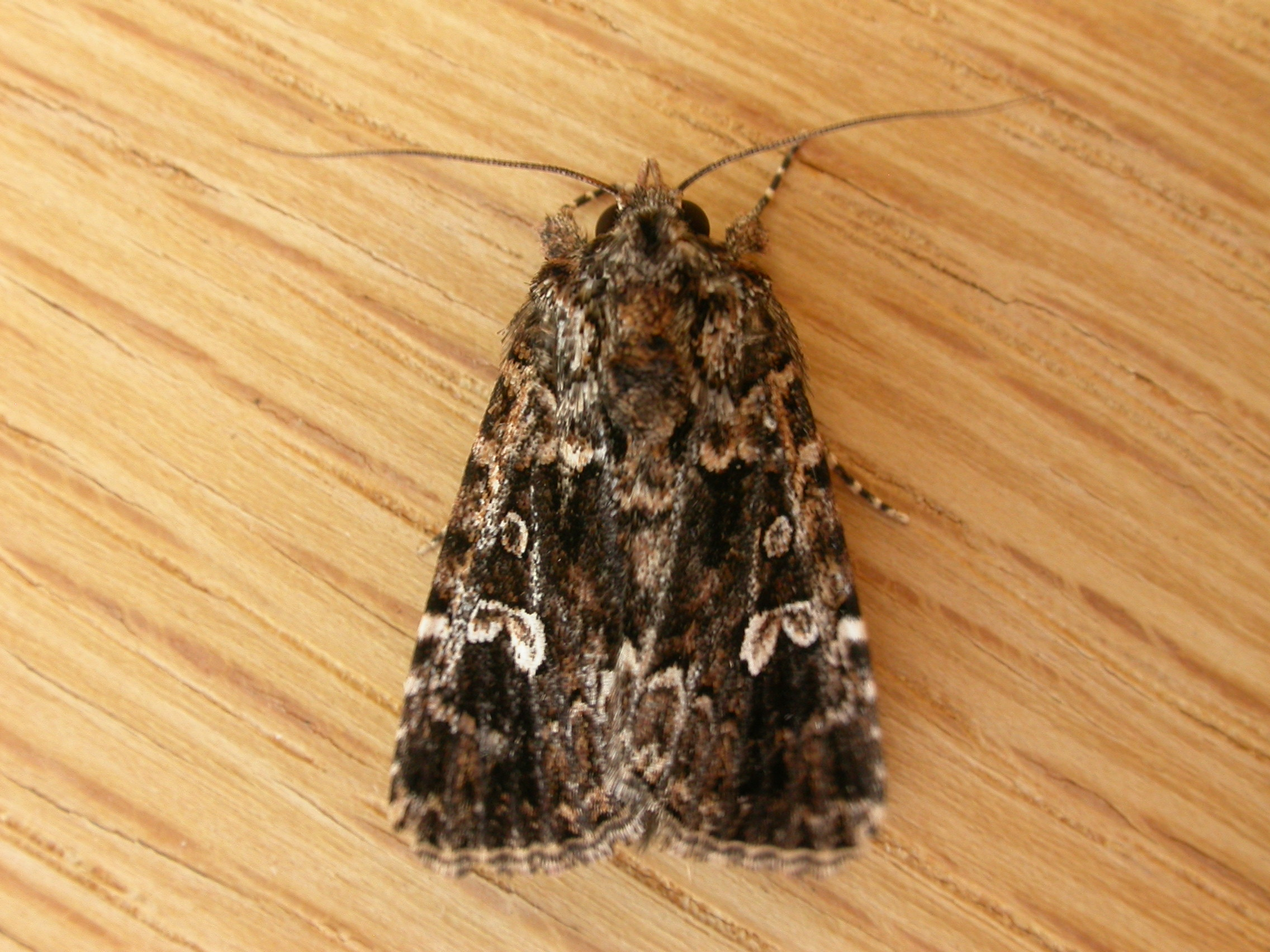

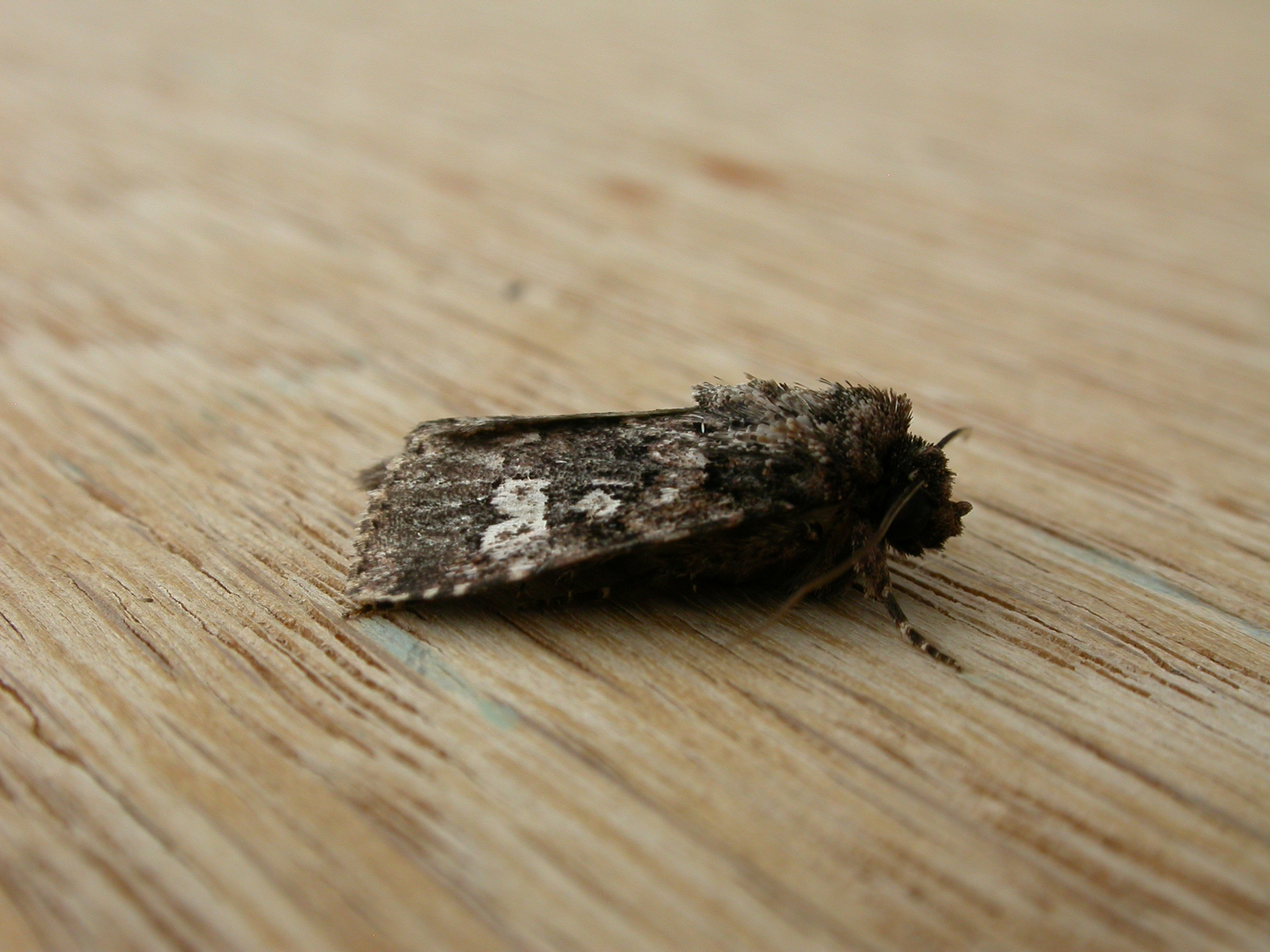

Scientific classification
- Domain: Eukaryota
- Kingdom: Animalia
- Phylum: Arthropoda
- Class: Insecta
- Order: Lepidoptera
- Superfamily: Noctuoidea
- Family: Noctuidae
- Genus: Ectopatria
- Species: E. horologa

Binomial name
- Ectopatria horologa (Meyrick, 1897)

Synonyms
- Orthosia horologa Meyrick, 1897; Ectopatria renalba Warren, 1912

= Ectopatria horologa =

Species of moth

Ectopatria horologa is a moth of the family Noctuidae. It is found in the Australian Capital Territory, New South Wales, Queensland, South Australia, Tasmania, Victoria, and Western Australia.

Larvae have been recorded feeding on Rhagodia parabolica.
