= Ectopatria xerampelina =

Scientific classification
- Domain: Eukaryota
- Kingdom: Animalia
- Phylum: Arthropoda
- Class: Insecta
- Order: Lepidoptera
- Superfamily: Noctuoidea
- Family: Noctuidae
- Genus: Ectopatria
- Species: E. xerampelina

Binomial name
- Ectopatria xerampelina (Turner, 1904)

Synonyms
- Prometopus xerampelina Turner, 1904

Species of moth

Ectopatria xerampelina is a moth of the family Noctuidae. It is found in Western Australia and South Australia.
