= Ectopatria paurogramma =

Scientific classification
- Domain: Eukaryota
- Kingdom: Animalia
- Phylum: Arthropoda
- Class: Insecta
- Order: Lepidoptera
- Superfamily: Noctuoidea
- Family: Noctuidae
- Genus: Ectopatria
- Species: E. paurogramma

Binomial name
- Ectopatria paurogramma (Lower, 1902)

Synonyms
- Agrotis paurogramma Lower, 1902; Namangana polymita Turner, 1941

Species of moth

Ectopatria paurogramma is a moth of the family Noctuidae. It is found in all of mainland Australia.
