= Ectopatria mniodes =

Scientific classification
- Domain: Eukaryota
- Kingdom: Animalia
- Phylum: Arthropoda
- Class: Insecta
- Order: Lepidoptera
- Superfamily: Noctuoidea
- Family: Noctuidae
- Genus: Ectopatria
- Species: E. mniodes

Binomial name
- Ectopatria mniodes (Lower, 1902)

Synonyms
- Agrotis mniodes Lower, 1902; Proteuxoa mniodes Hampson, 1903; Namangana eugraphica Turner, 1944

Species of moth

Ectopatria mniodes is a moth of the family Noctuidae. It is found in the Australian Capital Territory, New South Wales, the Northern Territory and Queensland.
