= Ectopatria mundoides =

Scientific classification
- Domain: Eukaryota
- Kingdom: Animalia
- Phylum: Arthropoda
- Class: Insecta
- Order: Lepidoptera
- Superfamily: Noctuoidea
- Family: Noctuidae
- Genus: Ectopatria
- Species: E. mundoides

Binomial name
- Ectopatria mundoides (Lower, 1893)

Synonyms
- Dasygaster mundoides Lower, 1893; Propatria mundoides Hampson, 1903

Species of moth

Ectopatria mundoides is a moth of the family Noctuidae. It is found in all of mainland Australia.
