= Ectopatria neuroides =

Scientific classification
- Domain: Eukaryota
- Kingdom: Animalia
- Phylum: Arthropoda
- Class: Insecta
- Order: Lepidoptera
- Superfamily: Noctuoidea
- Family: Noctuidae
- Genus: Ectopatria
- Species: E. neuroides

Binomial name
- Ectopatria neuroides (Swinhoe, 1901)

Synonyms
- Heliothis neuroides Swinhoe, 1901; Namangana albilinea Turner, 1943

Species of moth

Ectopatria neuroides is a moth of the family Noctuidae. It is found in New South Wales, the Northern Territory, Queensland, South Australia and Western Australia.
