= Ectopatria virginea =

Scientific classification
- Domain: Eukaryota
- Kingdom: Animalia
- Phylum: Arthropoda
- Class: Insecta
- Order: Lepidoptera
- Superfamily: Noctuoidea
- Family: Noctuidae
- Genus: Ectopatria
- Species: E. virginea

Binomial name
- Ectopatria virginea Lower, 1905

Species of moth

Ectopatria virginea is a moth of the family Noctuidae. It is found in South Australia.

== Original Description ==
Male, 36 mm. Head, palpi, thorax, and abdomen snow-white, legs snow-white. Antennæ ochreous. Forewings elongate, moderate, costa nearly straight, termen oblique, hardly rounded; snow-white, without markings; cilia snow-white. Hindwings snow-white, slightly iridescent; cilia snow-white. A distinct species, well characterised by the wholly white colour; at first sight it is not unlike Caradrina gypsina, Low., but is without markings of any kind. Adelaide, South Australia. One specimen: in October.

— Original description by Lower
