= Ectopatria contrasta =

Scientific classification
- Domain: Eukaryota
- Kingdom: Animalia
- Phylum: Arthropoda
- Class: Insecta
- Order: Lepidoptera
- Superfamily: Noctuoidea
- Family: Noctuidae
- Genus: Ectopatria
- Species: E. contrasta

Binomial name
- Ectopatria contrasta Strand, 1924

Synonyms
- Ectopatria dimidiata Strand, 1924; Ectopatria distincta Strand, 1924

Species of moth

Ectopatria contrasta is a moth of the family Noctuidae. It is found in Western Australia.
