= Lake Puketirini =

Lake in New Zealand

- formerly Lake Rotoiti
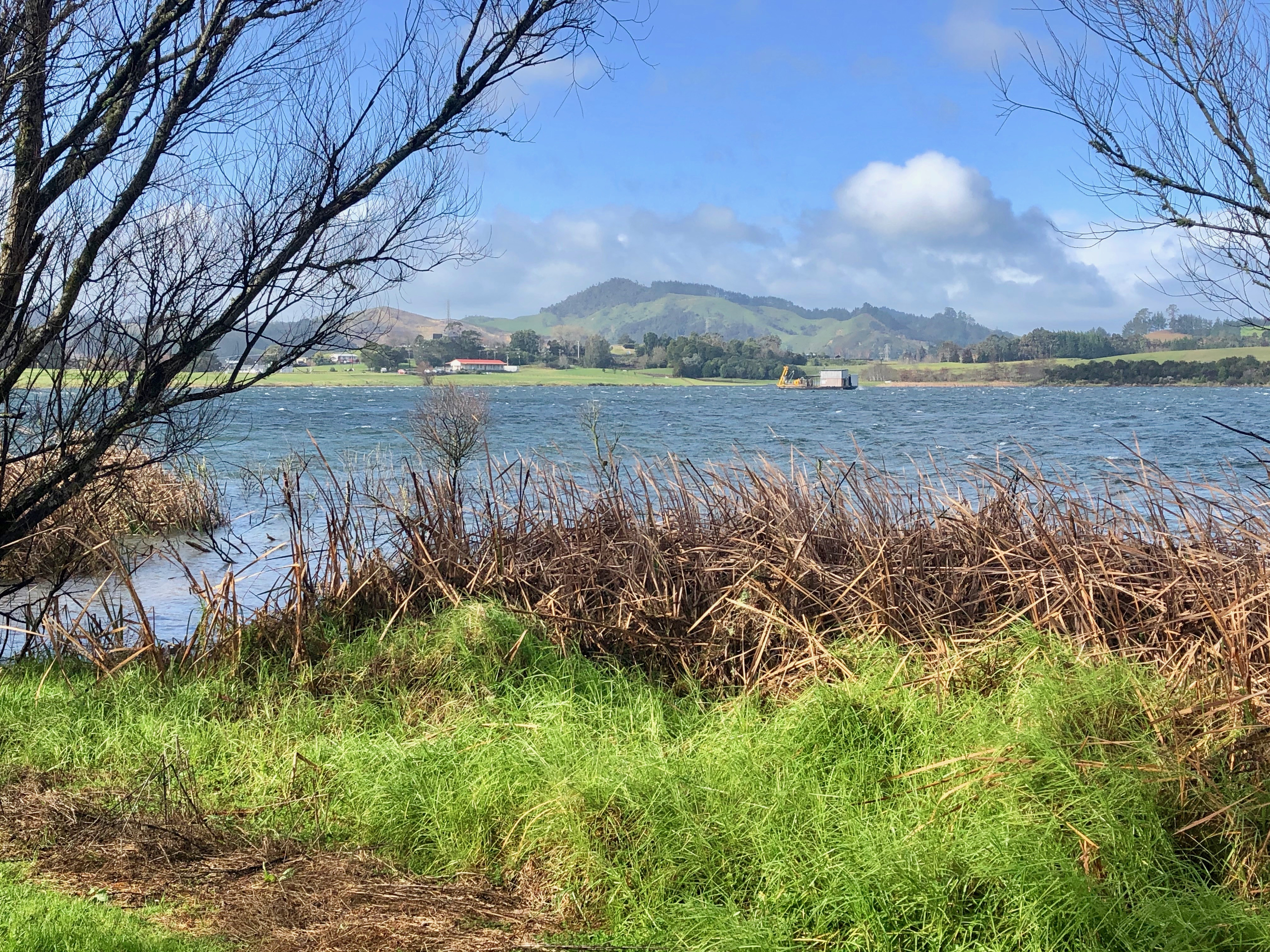
- Lake Puketirini and Hakarimata Range. The old railway station and diving school vessel are across the lake

- Location within North Island
- Location: North Island
- Coordinates: 37.567°S 175.141°E
- Type: former opencast mine
- Basin countries: New Zealand
- Max. length: 700 m (2,300 ft)
- Surface area: 54 hectares (130 acres) (open water)
- Max. depth: 64 metres (210 ft)
- Settlements: Huntly

Lake Puketirini is a former opencast coal mine, immediately to the west of Huntly and east of the larger, but much shallower Lake Waahi, in the Waikato Region. It is circled by a walkway.

== History ==
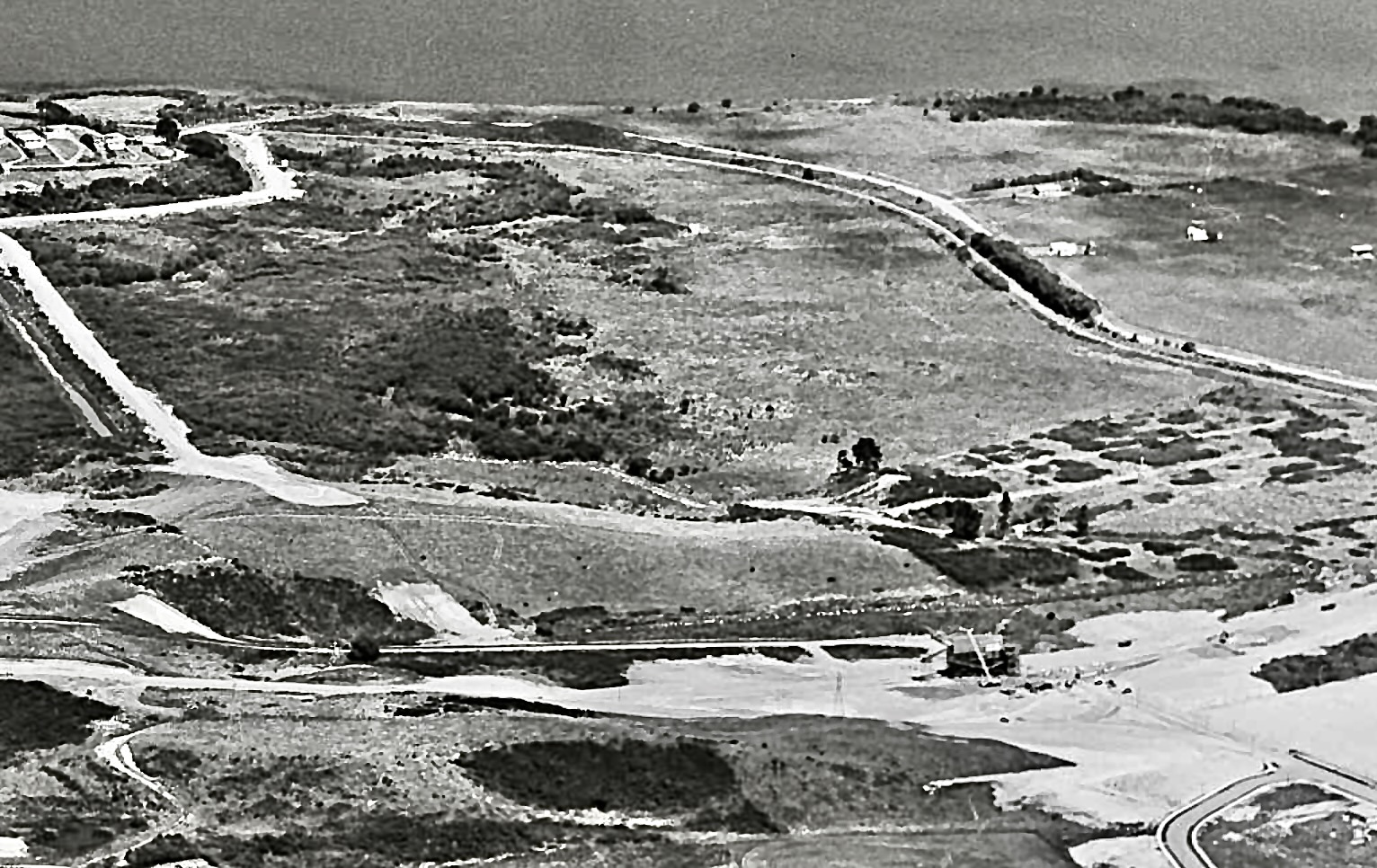
Site of Lake Puketirini (centre), with Cobham Cres (bottom right) being completed in 1959

The area was initially known as Puketirini, which included Lake Rotoiti, which was shown on maps until 1949, though a 1944 map showed it as Westmere and drained. The west shaft of Ralph Mine was at Puketirini and used for rescue after the 1914 explosion. The site was identified as a potential coal mine in 1929 and land was bought by the government between 1940 and 1980.

Mining began on part of the site in 1954, or 1956. The initial mining used small excavators. From 1984 the mine was extended to the north. It was transferred to the Coal Corporation in 1986 and Weavers opencast coal mine excavated the area until 1993, using a bucketwheel excavator and conveyor belt to dig out 16,000,000 m^{3} (21,000,000 cu yd) of overburden and 2,300,000 t (2,500,000 tons) of coal, mostly for Glenbrook steelworks. Much of the area around the lake is unconsolidated overburden.

The shoreline was shaped by 1999 and the lake was full by 2005. In December 2006, Waikato District Council acquired part of the site for recreational use from Solid Energy.

== Pollution ==
A 2006 study found the lake was mesotrophic and that koi carp were present.

== Coalfields Museum ==
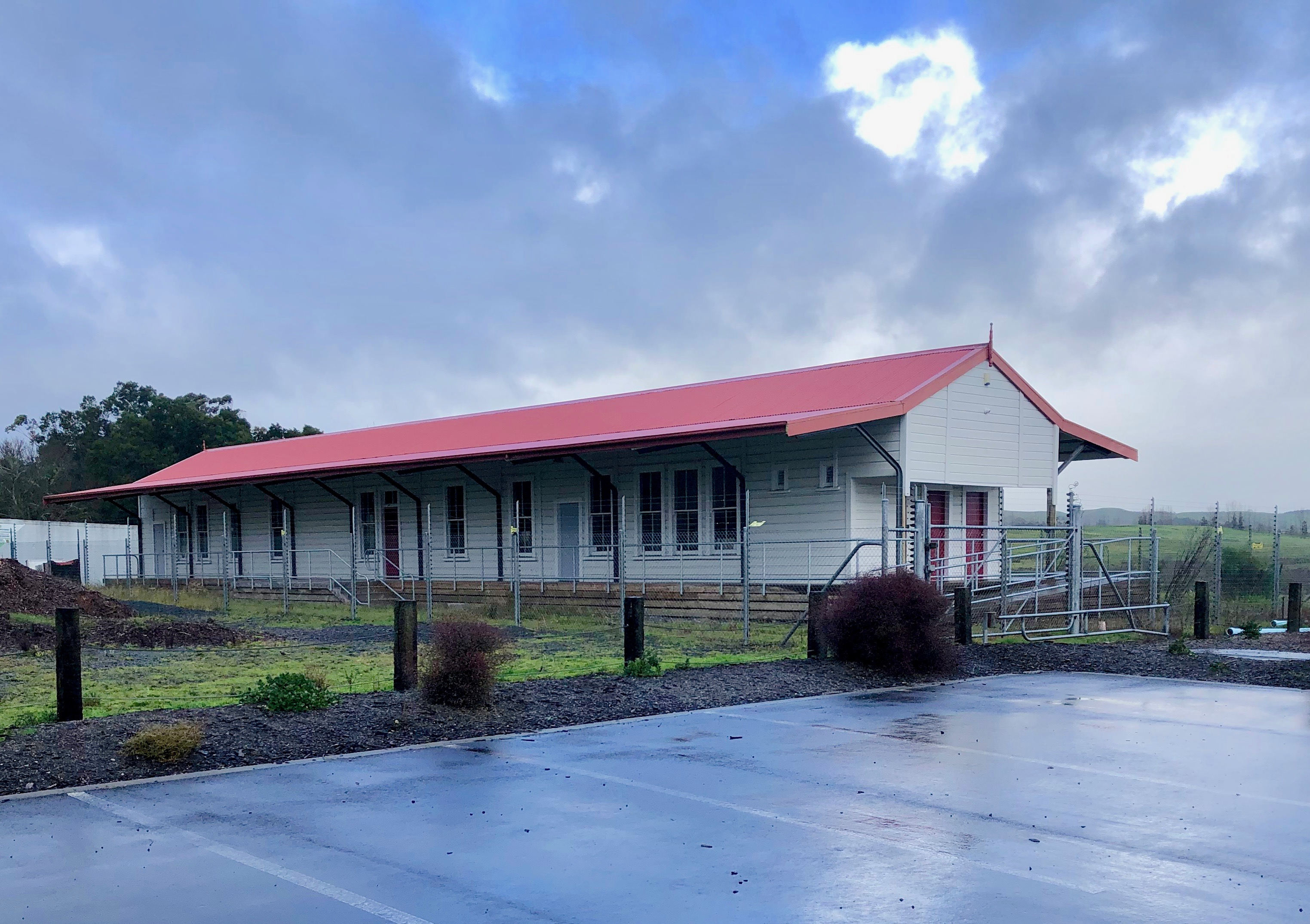
Huntly railway station, moved to Lake Puketirini in 2008. It is surrounded by a security fence

A 1978 map shows a siding from the Glen Afton branch had been laid. It was on that alignment that, in 2008, the 1939 Huntly railway station was moved, as part of plans to put the Waikato Coalfields Museum beside the lake. In 2017 the museum was further discussed and moved to the centre of Huntly.

== Diving School ==
In 2000 the New Zealand School of Commercial Diver Training opened. It now operates as the Subsea Training Centre.
