= Ectopatria deloptis =

Scientific classification
- Domain: Eukaryota
- Kingdom: Animalia
- Phylum: Arthropoda
- Class: Insecta
- Order: Lepidoptera
- Superfamily: Noctuoidea
- Family: Noctuidae
- Genus: Ectopatria
- Species: E. deloptis

Binomial name
- Ectopatria deloptis (Lower, 1908)

Synonyms
- Proteuxoa deloptis Lower, 1908; Namangana delographa Turner, 1920

Species of moth

Ectopatria deloptis is a moth of the family Noctuidae. It is found in New South Wales and Western Australia.
