= L II River =

Coordinates: 43°42′32.76″S 172°26′45.96″E

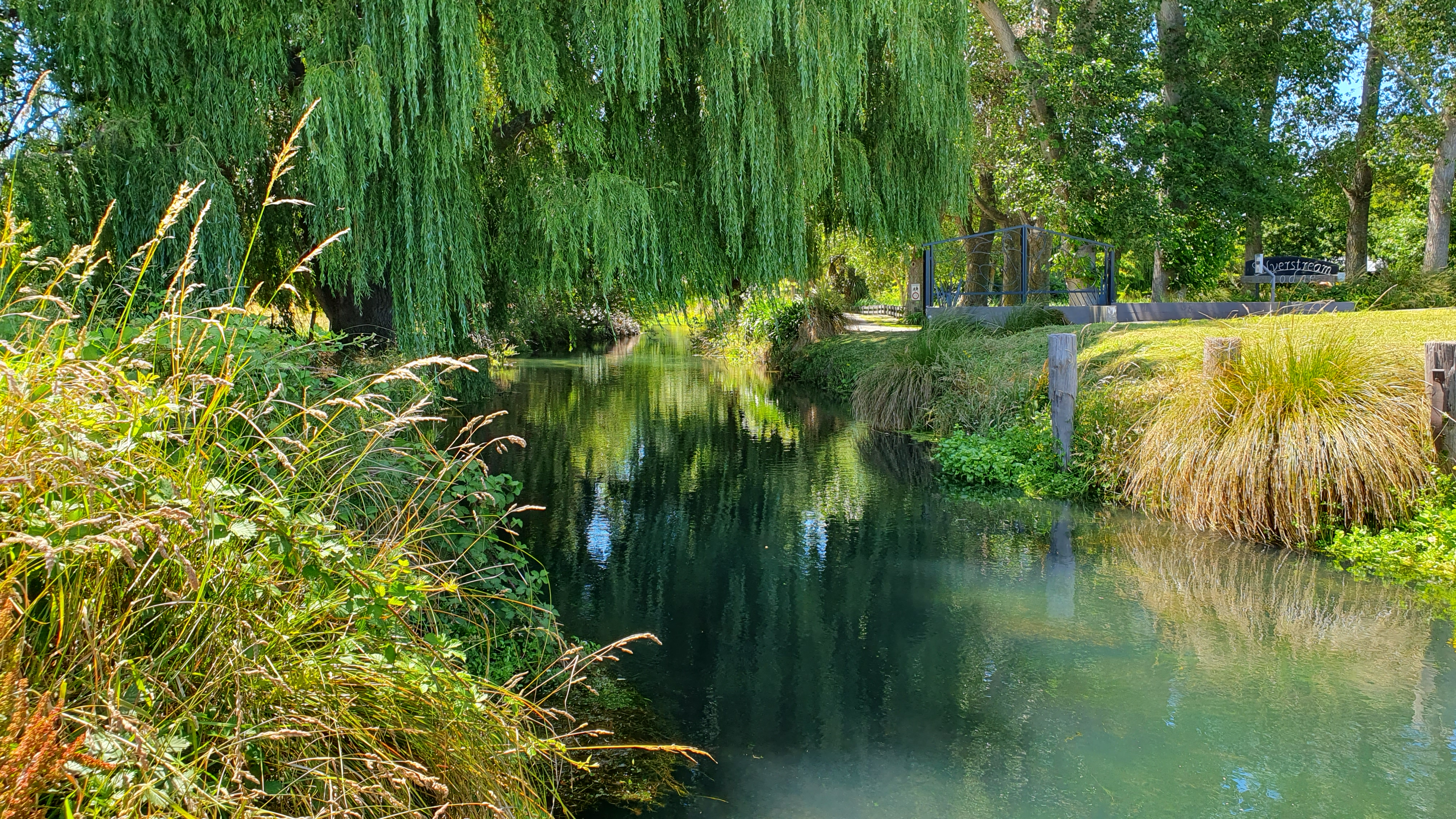
- Ararira L II River

Location
- Country: New Zealand

Physical characteristics
- Mouth
  - location: Lake Ellesmere / Te Waihora
- Basin size: 6600 ha

The L II River (Māori: Ararira or Te awa o Āraiara) is a small spring-fed river in Canterbury, New Zealand, technically a canal which was dug by European colonists to connect springs and drain land. It rises near Lincoln and flows through very flat farmland, mostly fed by land drainage ditches before emptying into Lake Ellesmere / Te Waihora just east of the mouth of the Selwyn River / Waikirikiri.

== See also ==
- List of rivers of New Zealand
