= Lake Waahi =

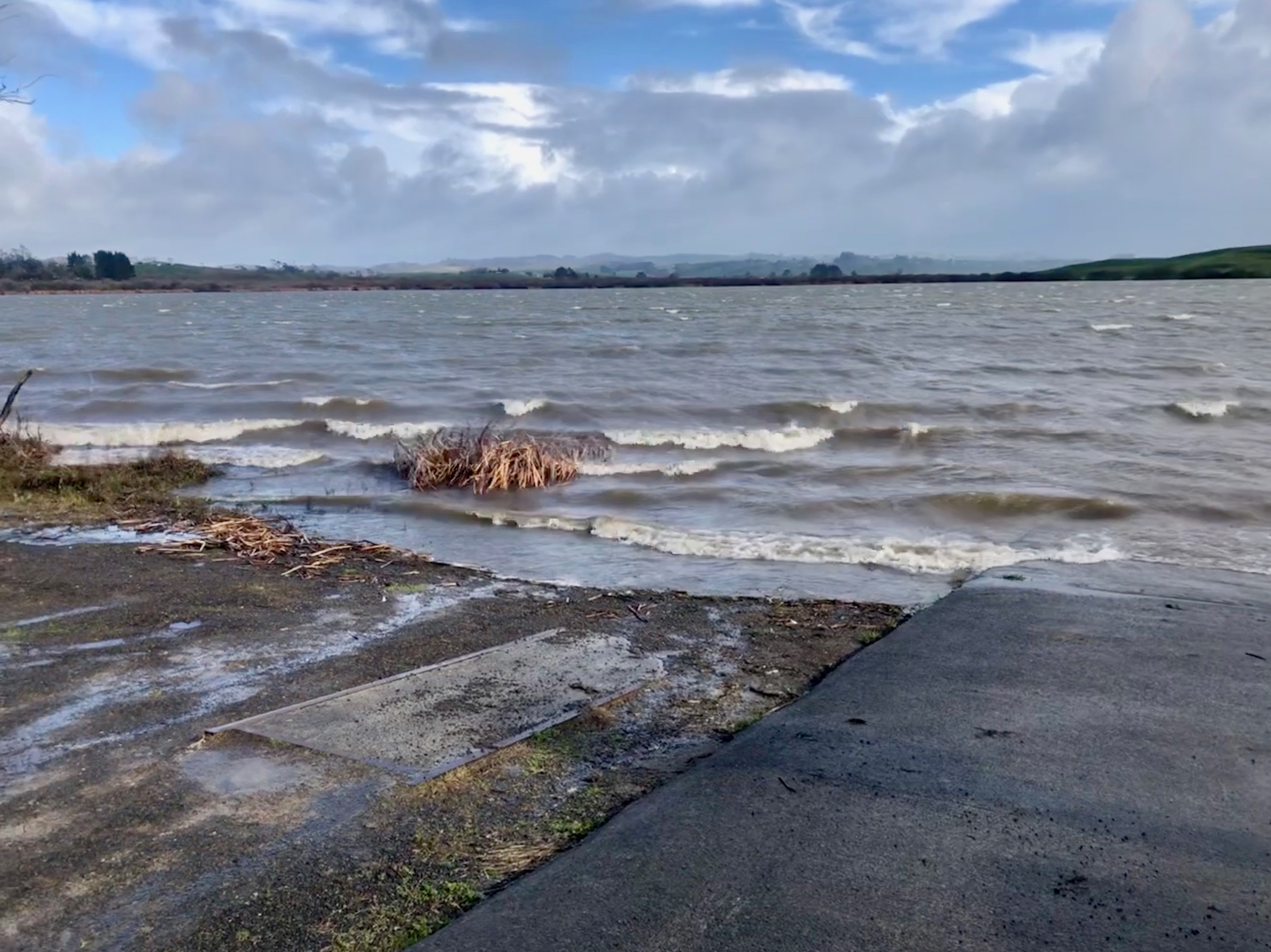
- Lake Waahi boat ramp

- Location within North Island
- Location: North Island
- Coordinates: 37°33′30″S 175°07′30″E
- Type: riverine lake
- Primary outflows: Waahi Stream
- Basin countries: New Zealand
- Max. length: 3.2 km (2.0 mi)
- Max. width: 0.6 km (0.37 mi)
- Surface area: 522 hectares (1,290 acres) (open water)
- Max. depth: 5 metres (16 ft)

Lake Waahi (or up to 1913 sometimes called Lake Waihi) is located immediately to the west of Huntly, in the Waikato Region. Lake Waahi is a riverine lake, which links to the Waikato River by way of the short Waahi Stream. The smaller Lake Puketirini lies immediately to Waahi's southeast.

The lake has a maximum depth of five metres and the open water covers approximately 522 hectares, though the lake extends further through marsh and fenland.

The lake is situated within predominantly pastoral land.

== Pollution ==
During the 1970s the lake had a healthy cover of macrophytes, but by 1981 the lake became supertrophic, with high turbidity and microscopic algae. Monitoring to 2004 showed no significant changes.

== See also ==
- List of lakes of New Zealand
