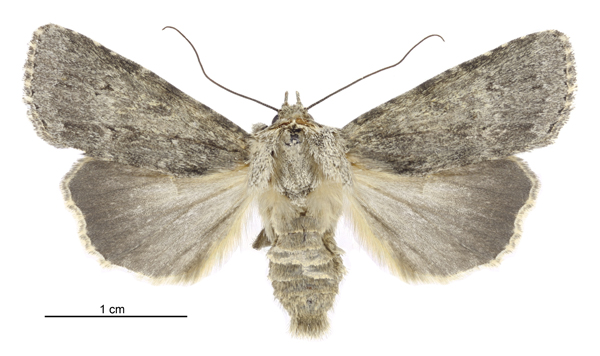
- Female
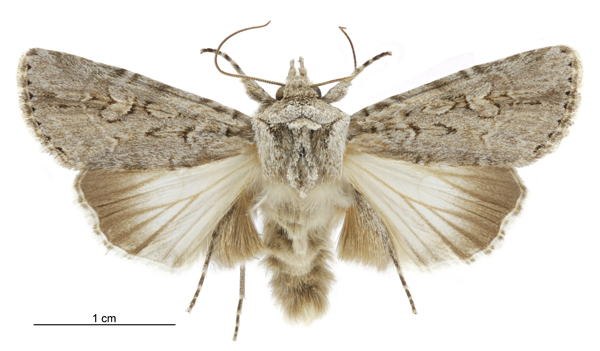
- Male

Scientific classification
- Kingdom: Animalia
- Phylum: Arthropoda
- Clade: Pancrustacea
- Class: Insecta
- Order: Lepidoptera
- Superfamily: Noctuoidea
- Family: Noctuidae
- Genus: Ectopatria
- Species: E. aspera

Binomial name
- Ectopatria aspera (Walker, 1857)

Synonyms
- Hadena aspera Walker, 1857; Xylina provida Walker, 1858; Xylina canescens Walker, 1865; Xylina saxatilis Walker, 1869

= Ectopatria aspera =

Species of moth

Ectopatria aspera is a moth of the family Noctuidae. It is found in New South Wales, South Australia, Victoria, Western Australia and New Zealand. It is considered a migratory species.

== Taxonomy ==
This species was first described by Francis Walker in 1857 and originally named Hadena aspera. George Hudson described and illustrated this species under the name E. aspera in his 1939 book A supplement to the butterflies and moths of New Zealand. The holotype specimen of E. aspera is held at the Natural History Museum, London. The holotype specimen of the now synonymised Xylina saxatilis is held at Museums Victoria.

== Description ==
Hudson described this species as follows:

The expansion of the wings is 1 1/2 inches (36-38 mm.) The forewings are dull bluish-grey, very faintly and sparsely speckled with white; the basal and first lines are very indistinct; the orbicular is small oval; the claviform elongate, both indistinct; the reniform faintly outlined in blackish, its lower portion somewhat dilated; second line, obscure, dentate, with a few of the dentations faintly marked in blackish; a pale wavy subterminal line; veins 4, 5 and 6 finely marked in black between second and subterminal lines; a series of black terminal dots; the cilia are whitish, broadly barred with blackish-grey. The hind-wings are pale grey, becoming dark grey on apex and termen in male, wholly dark-grey in female; the cilia are white, with a dusky line.

Alfred Philpott described the species as follows:

The forewings and thorax are whitish-grey. The hindwings are white with a broad fuscous area around the apex and termen in males and wholly fuscous in females. Males have a dense truncate tuft of hair on the middle tibia.

== Distribution ==
This species is found in Australia in New South Wales, South Australia, Victoria, Western Australia and in New Zealand.

== Behaviour ==
This species is considered a migratory species.
