= Pāuatahanui Wildlife Reserve =

Wetland reserve in Wellington, New Zealand

Coordinates: 41°06′09″S 174°54′52″E

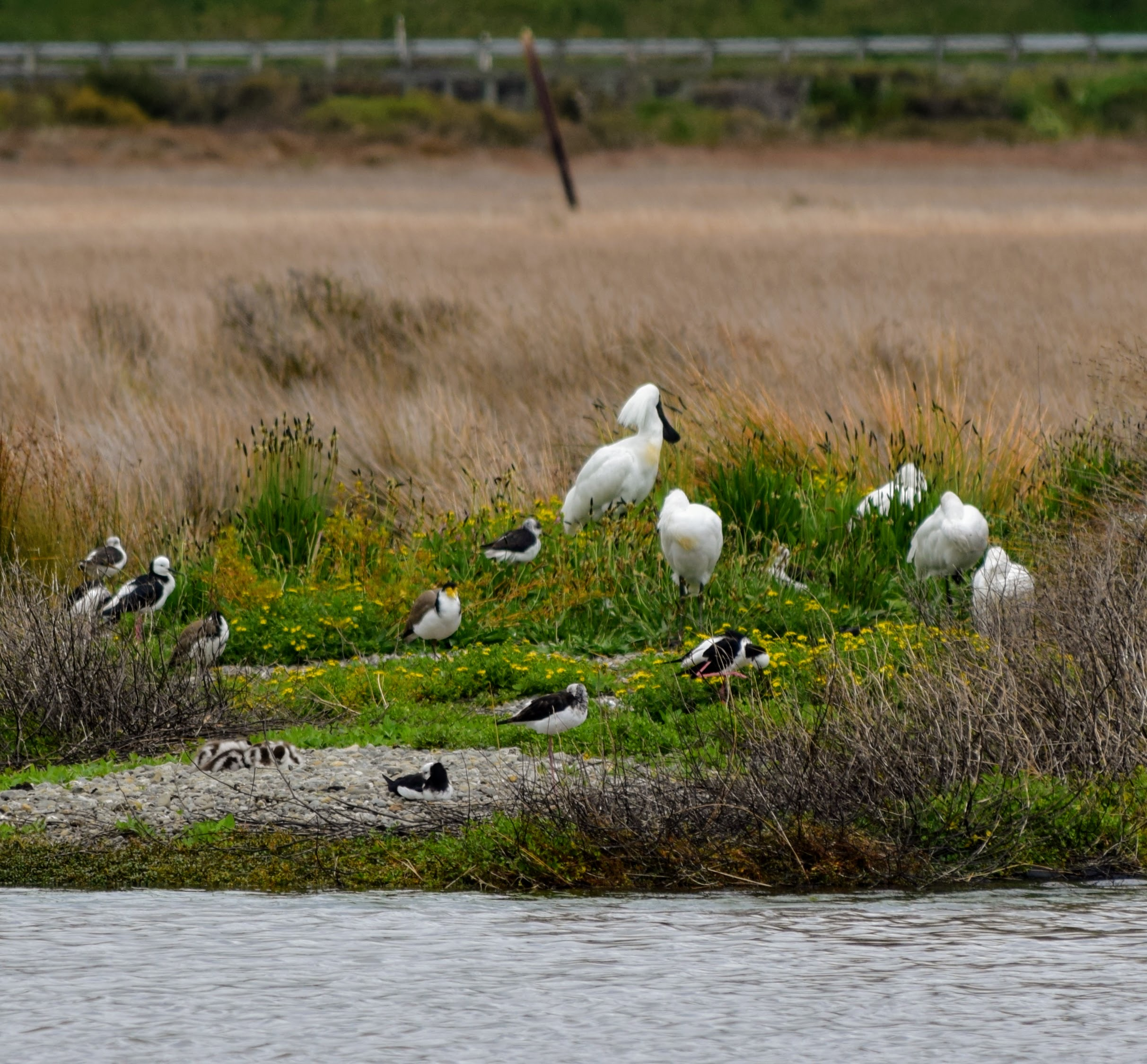
- Royal spoonbills and Pied stilts
- Interactive map of Pāuatahanui Wildlife Reserve
- Location: Porirua, New Zealand
- Area: 50 hectares (120 acres)
- Created: 1984
- Operator: Department of Conservation, Forest & Bird

Pāuatahanui Wildlife Reserve is a wetland reserve at the eastern edge of the Pāuatahanui Inlet of the Porirua Harbour in Porirua, New Zealand. The reserve contains the most significant area of saltmarsh in the lower North Island of New Zealand. It also includes tidal mudflats, shrub lands and regenerating coastal forest. The reserve covers 50 hectares (120 acres), of which the Department of Conservation owns 46 hectares, and Forest & Bird owns the remaining 4 hectares under covenant to the Queen Elizabeth II Trust. The reserve is managed by a committee of Forest & Bird representatives in association with the Department of Conservation.

== History ==
The area had previously degraded into a wasteland that included a go-kart track, playing fields, demolition spoil, farm land and a cattleyards. Work on restoration began in 1984.

In 1985 the area was made into a Wildlife Management Reserve. This involved the development of ponds, walking tracks and viewing hides. The reserve was officially opened on 15 April 1989.

In 2002 the area of the reserve was extended by 1.8 ha (4.4 acres) through the purchase by the Nature Heritage Fund of land adjoining the banks of the Pauatahanui Stream.

== Plants ==
The habitats in the reserve range from tidal mudflats to coastal forest. The main wetland species are reeds, rushes, harakeke, raupō, glasswort, sea primrose, New Zealand spinach, half-star, and wild celery. The coastal scrub includes coastal tree daisy, marsh ribbonwood, ngaio, taupata, kānuka and mānuka. The rare succulent Thyridia repens is also found.

== Birds ==
Many different native and exotic birds can be found at the Pāuatahanui Wildlife Reserve, including the bar-tailed godwit, royal spoonbill, caspian tern, paradise duck, pied stilt, sacred kingfisher, white-faced heron, Australasian shoveler, pūkeko and black shag.

In the areas of regenerating bush, the birds that can be seen include tūī, grey warblers and fantails.

In April 2017, twenty-two fernbirds were released into the reserve, in a translocation from Lake Rotokare Scenic Reserve in Taranaki. Fernbirds have been seen in the reserve in the following years.

== Freshwater fish ==
The Pāuatahanui stream flows through the wildlife reserve at the south-eastern corner of the inlet. This stream provides habitat for native and threatened fish species including inanga, longfin eel, giant kōkopu, and redfin bully.

== Threats to the reserve ==
There are many threats to the reserve from predators and human activity. Predators that threaten the reserve include stoats and rats, but also domestic cats.

Surveys of cockles in 1992 and 1995 indicated a decline to only one third of the numbers estimated in 1976. Silt and contamination from subdivisions and stormwater drains. Increased runoff of contaminated stormwater from urban expansion and increased dairy farming. Silt from construction works and runoff from the Transmission Gully motorway were considered significant threats to the reserve in a 1996 study of the environmental impact of the planned motorway.

Studies of the seagrass Zostera muelleri in the Pāuatahanui inlet have shown that pollution from fine sediment is preventing seagrass re-establishing in sites where it formerly grew. The results of the study emphasise the critical importance of strategies to reduce the amount of fine sediments from catchment areas that reach estuaries.

In 2011, the wildlife reserve was being polluted by sewage runoff from septic tanks in adjoining properties that were not connected to a trunk sewer. Porirua City Council was investigating connecting these properties to the sewerage system to eliminate the problem.

In 2014, a man was arrested after shooting ducks in the reserve.

== Awards ==
Pāuatahanui Wildlife Reserve was one of three winners of the 2001 New Zealand Wetland Conservation Award, run jointly by Fish & Game New Zealand and the Department of Conservation. The award recognised 17 years of hard work by volunteers.

In the Wellingtonian of the Year awards 2009, Wanda Tate was recognised with the Environment Award, for 17 years work on restoring the Pāuatahanui Wildlife Reserve. Tate also won the Annual National Golden Spade award from Forest and Bird, and a QSM for her work on conservation.

== Gallery ==
Pāuatahanui wildlife reserve

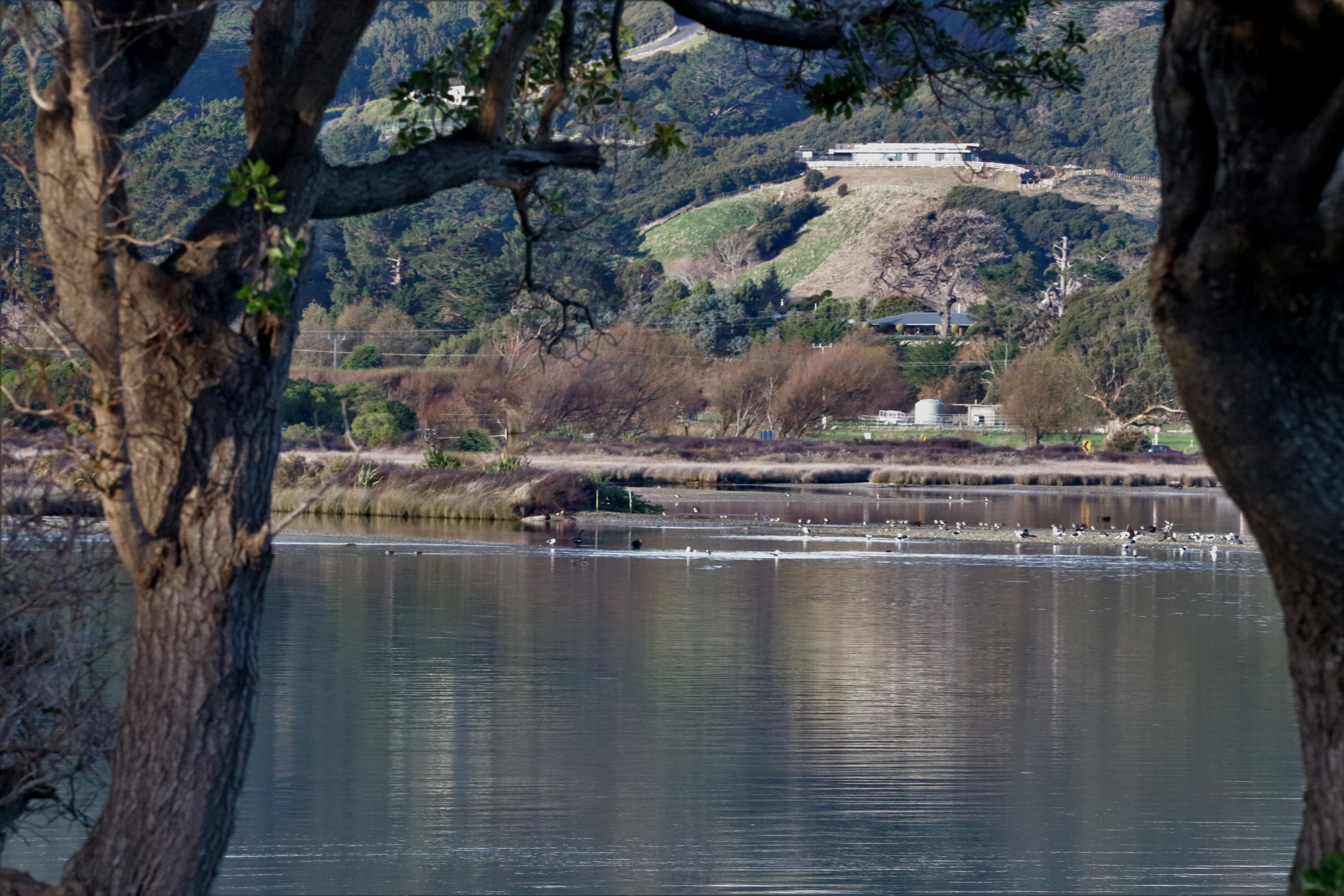

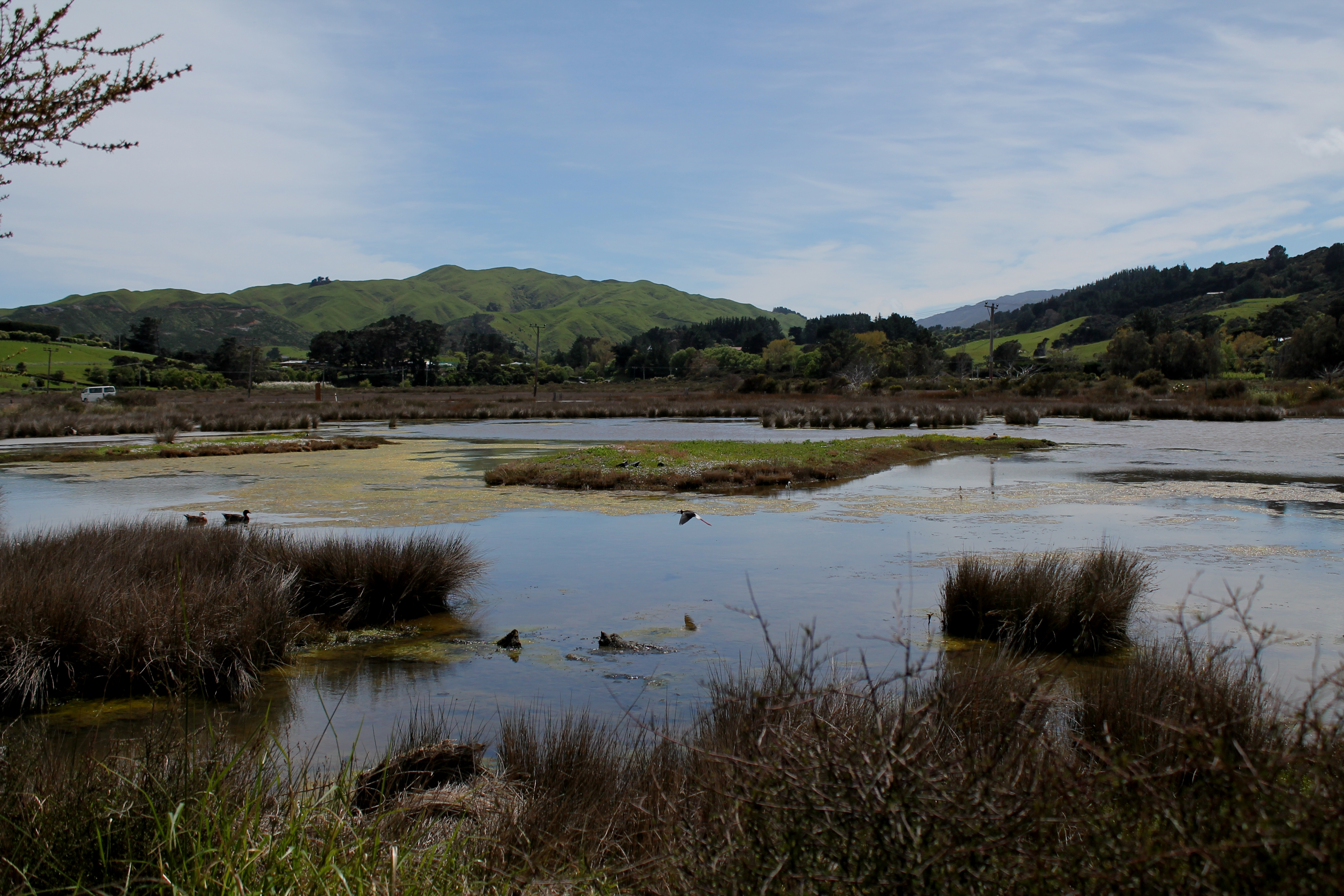

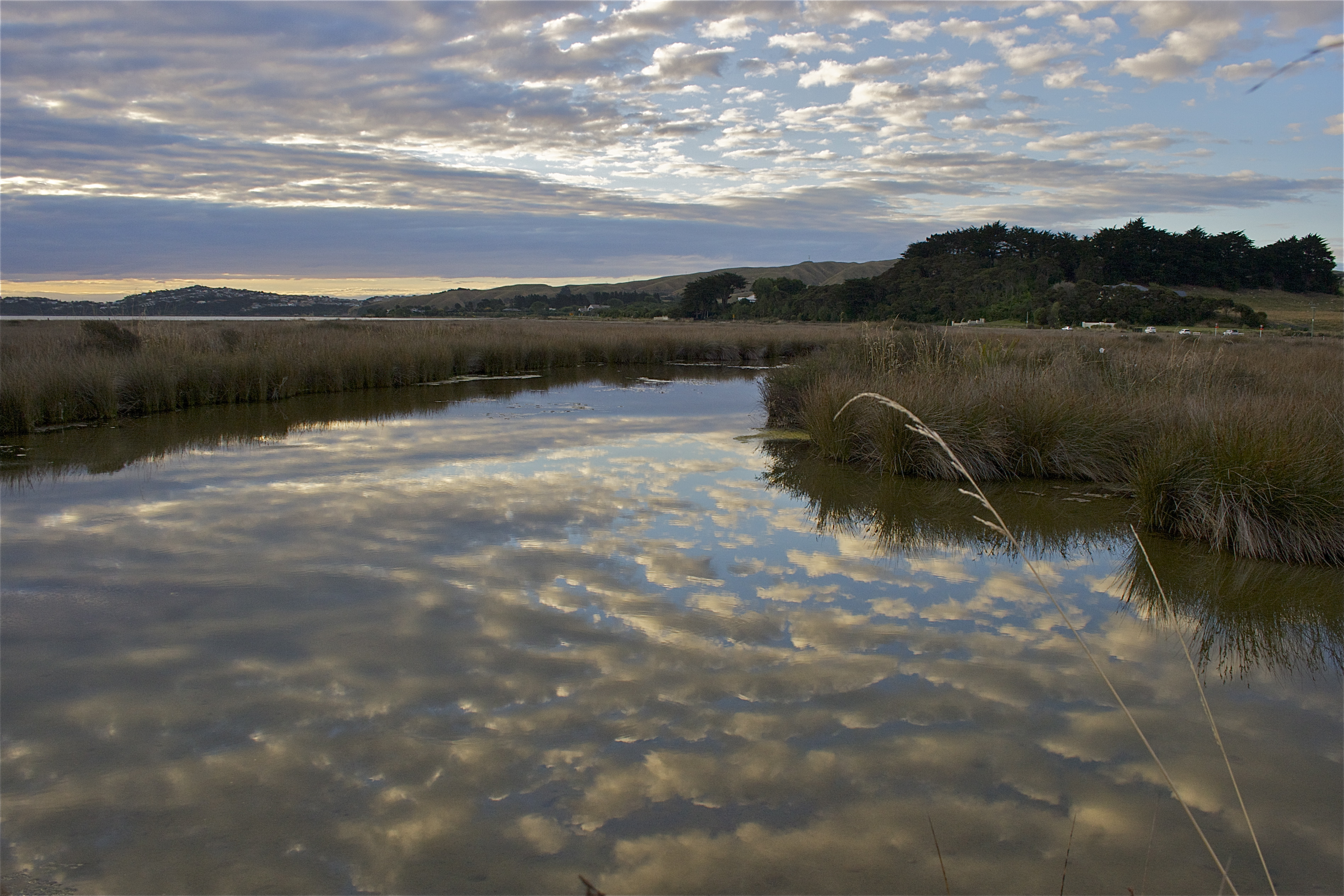

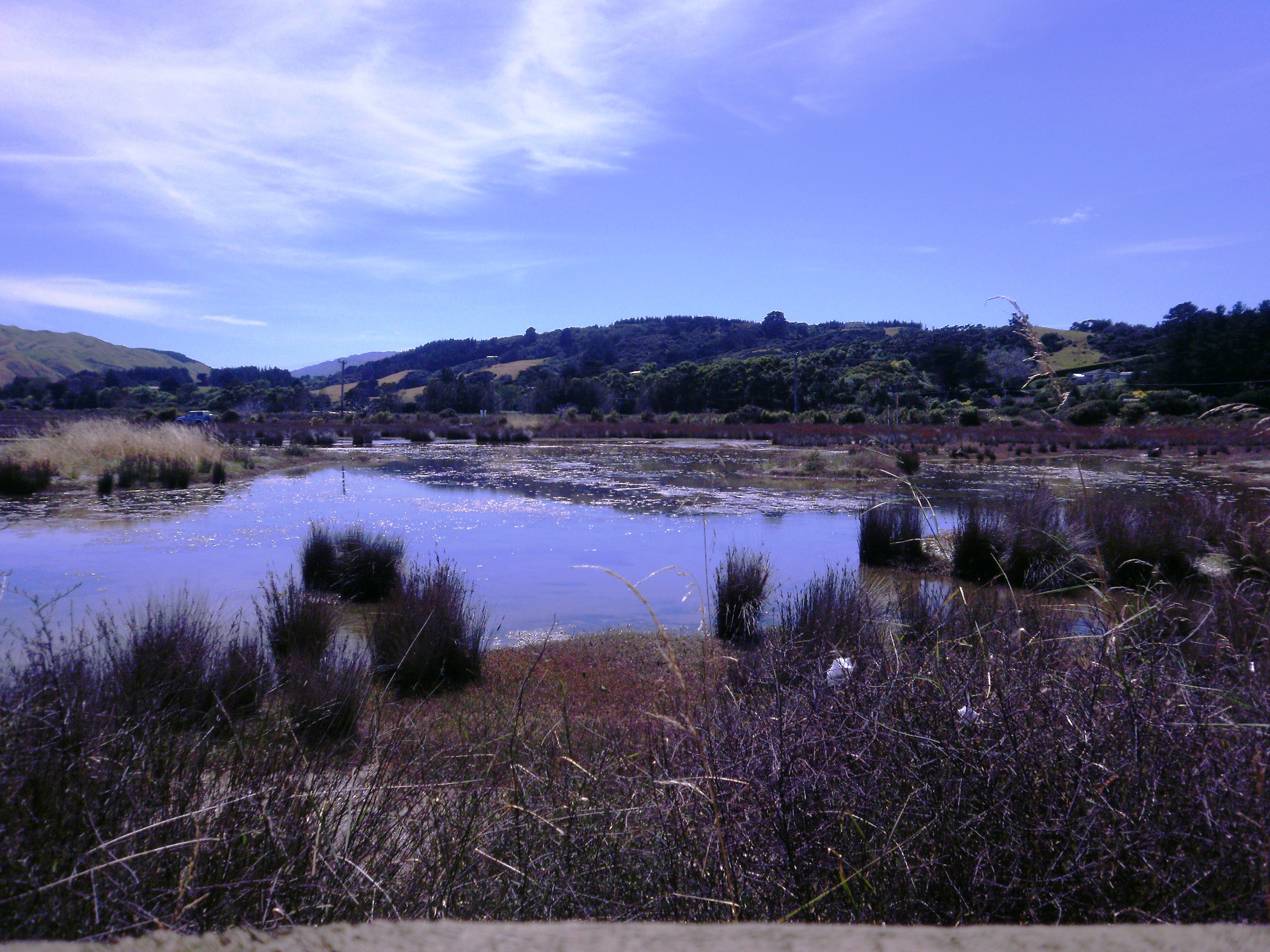

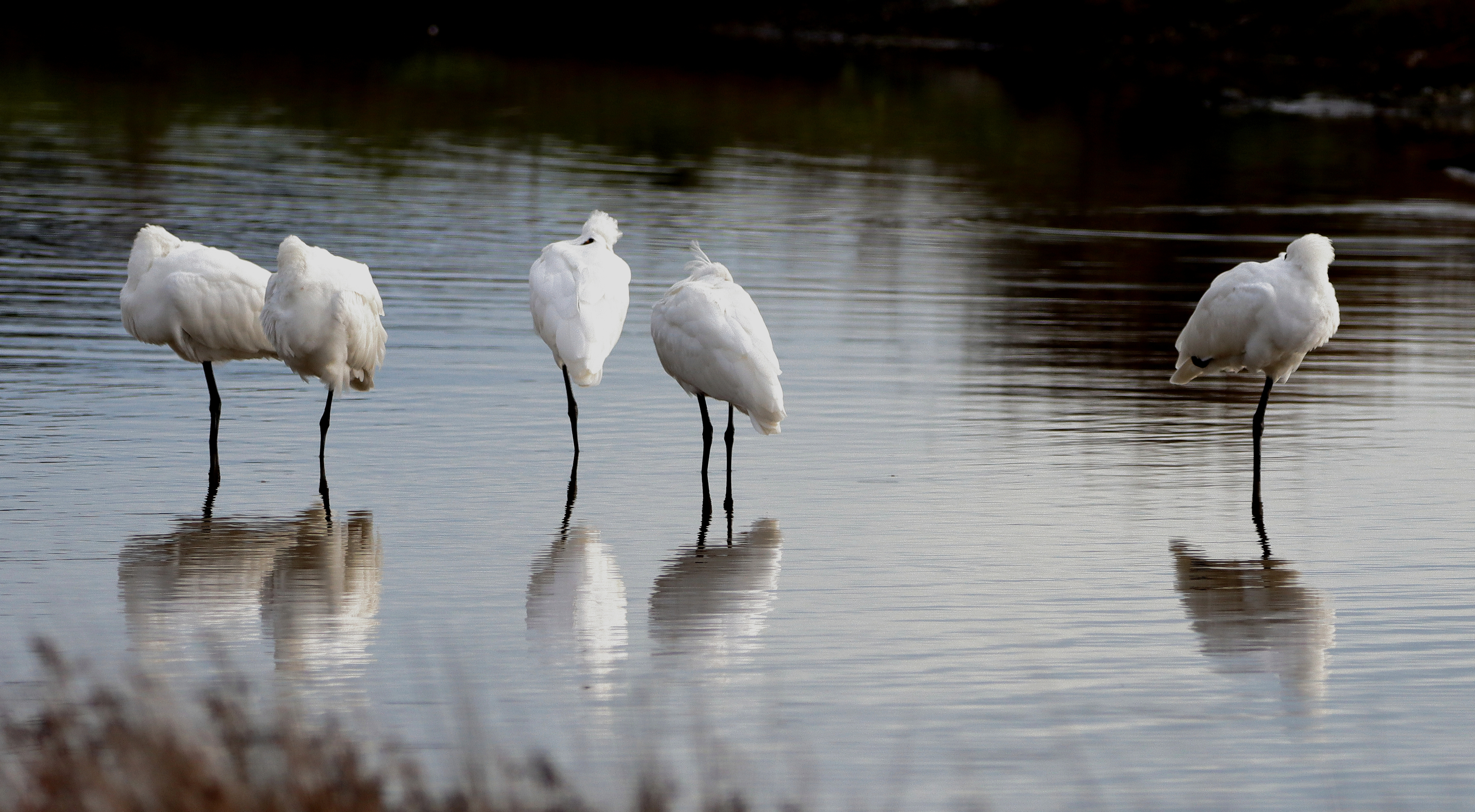

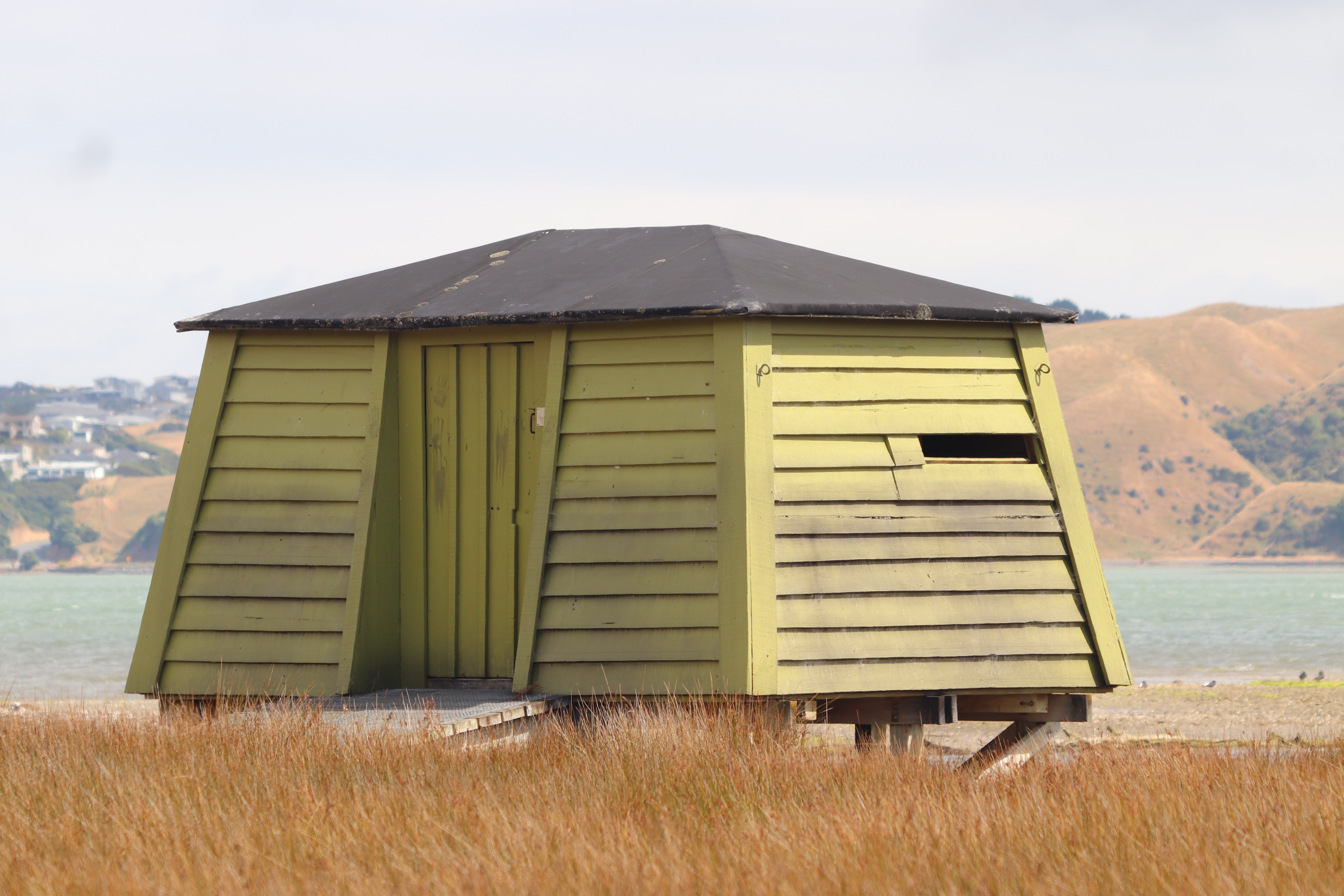

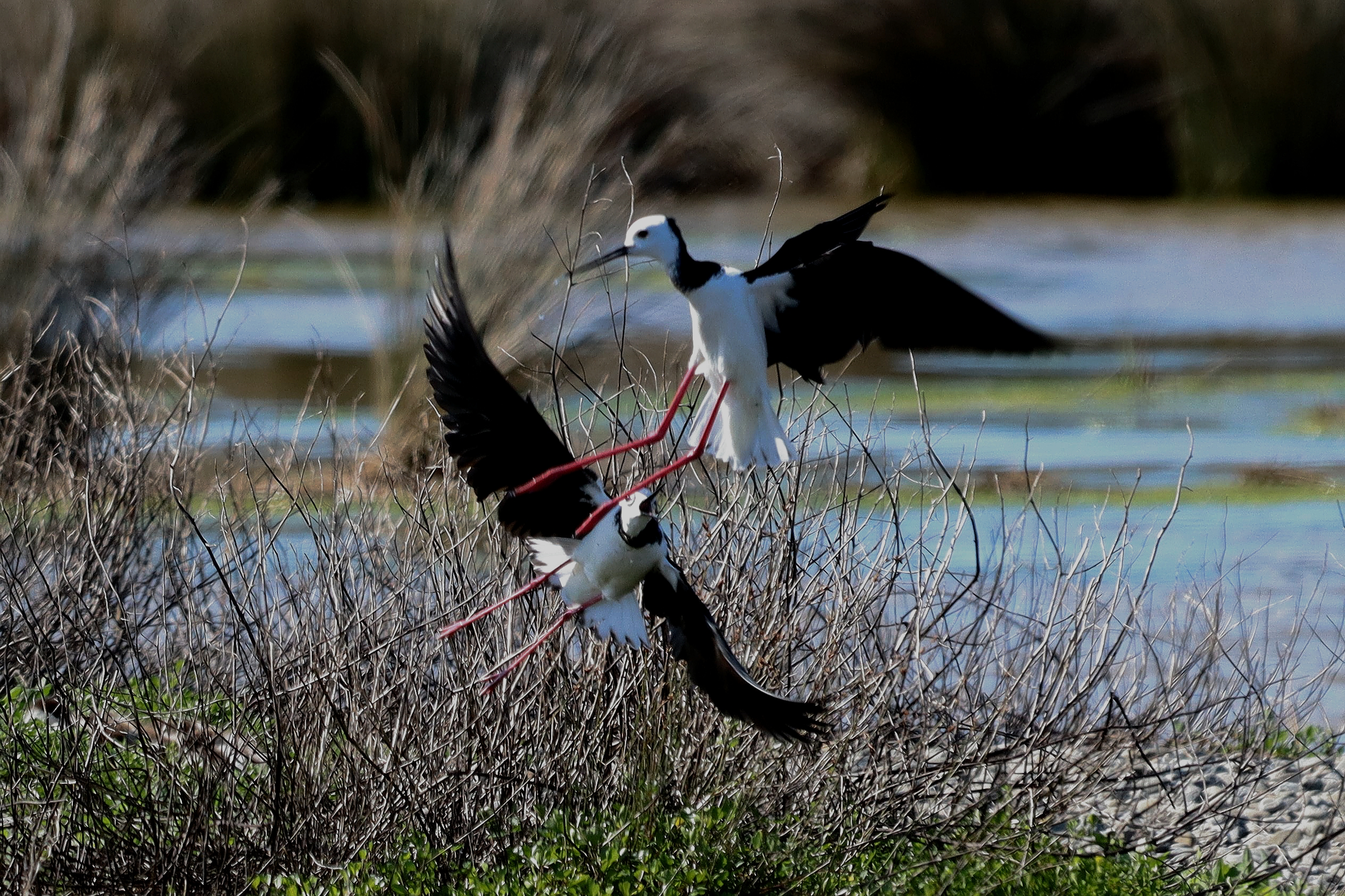

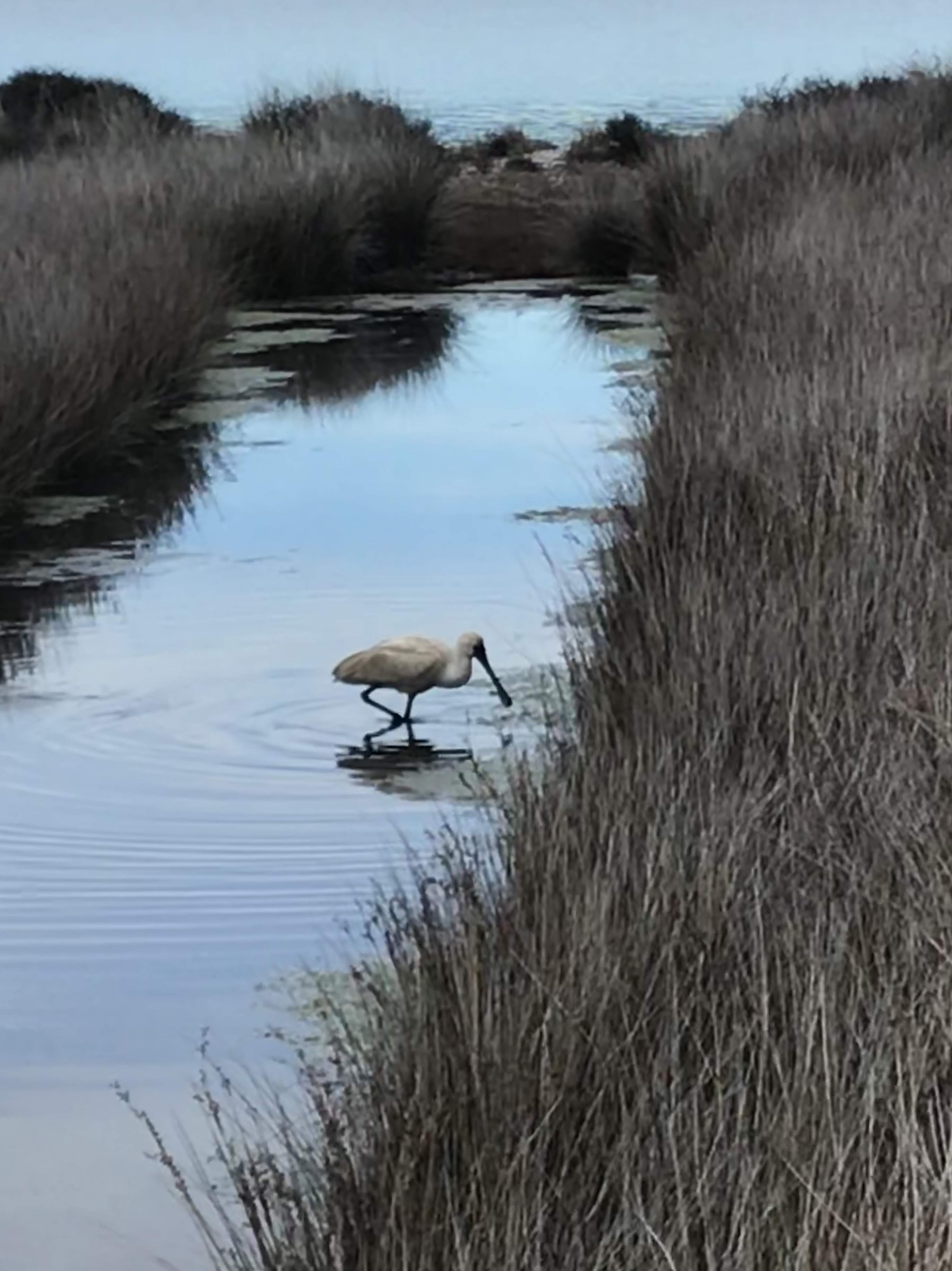

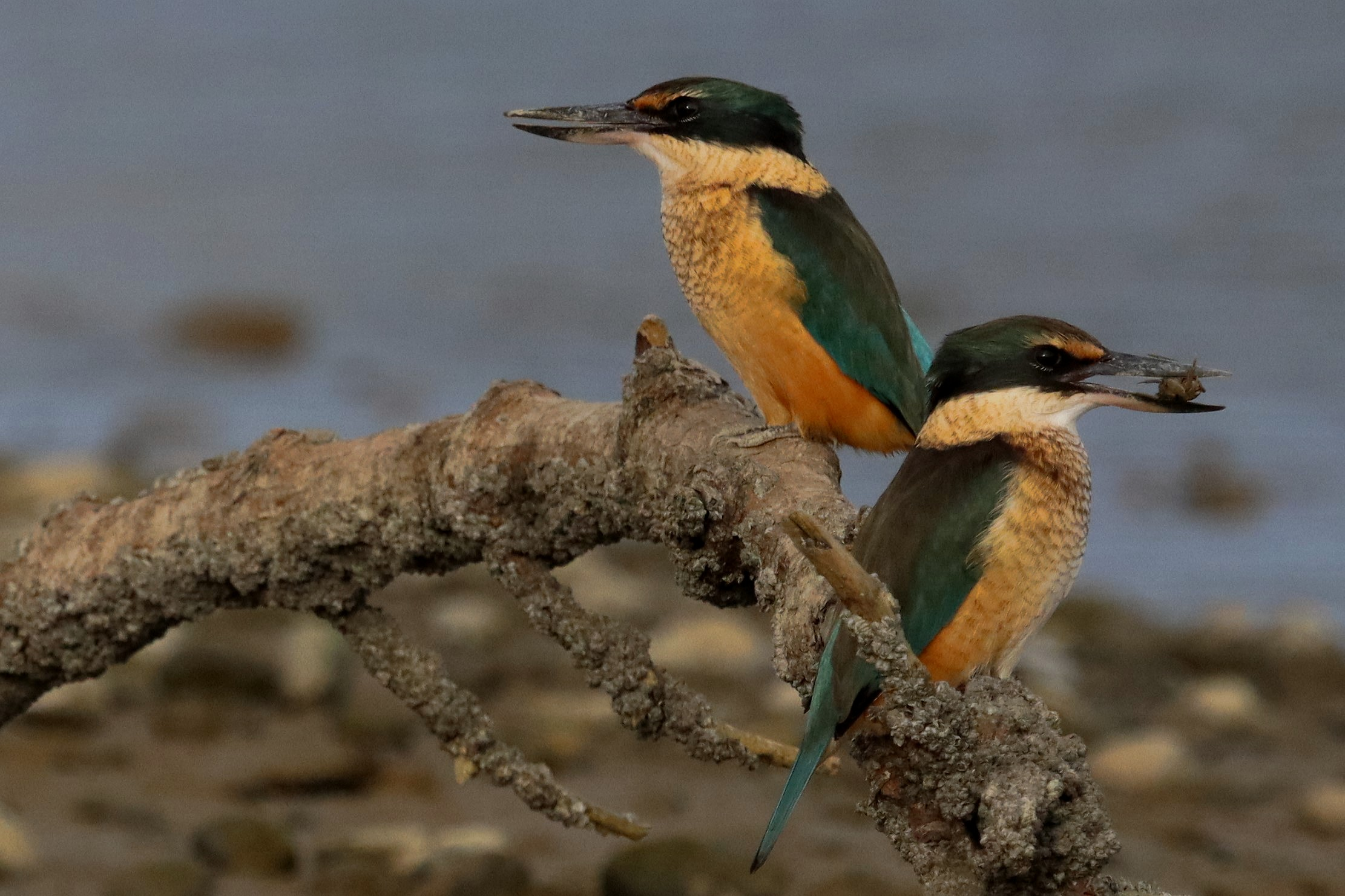
