= Lake Rotongaro =

Lake in the North Island of New Zealand

- Location within North Island
- Location: North Island
- Coordinates: 37°29′00″S 175°07′00″E
- Type: riverine
- Primary outflows: Rotongaro Canal
- Catchment area: 19.5 km^{2} (7.5 mi^{2})
- Basin countries: New Zealand
- Max. length: 2.5 km (1.6 mi)
- Max. width: 2.2 km (1.4 mi)
- Surface area: 292 hectares (720 acres) (open water)
- Max. depth: 3.3 metres (11 ft)

Lake Rotongaro is located to the west of Ohinewai in the Waikato Region of New Zealand. It is a large shallow riverine lake, which links to the Waikato River. It is situated between the Waikato River and the larger Lake Whangape.

The lake was lowered by 2.33 ft (0.71 m) in 1925, by means of a 2.75 mi (4.43 km) x 18 ft (5.5 m) canal, which drains into Lake Rotongaroiti, which then flows through the Rotongaro canal, to drain into the Whangape Stream, just below Lake Whangape.

The lake area is approximately 292 ha, with a max depth of 3.3 m. The catchment area is predominantly pastoral, with an estimated area of 1950 ha.

== Etymology ==
In Māori, rotongaro means "hidden lake" (roto = lake, ngaro = hidden).

== See also ==
- List of lakes of New Zealand
