= Te Rahu =

Settlement in Waikato, New Zealand

- Village
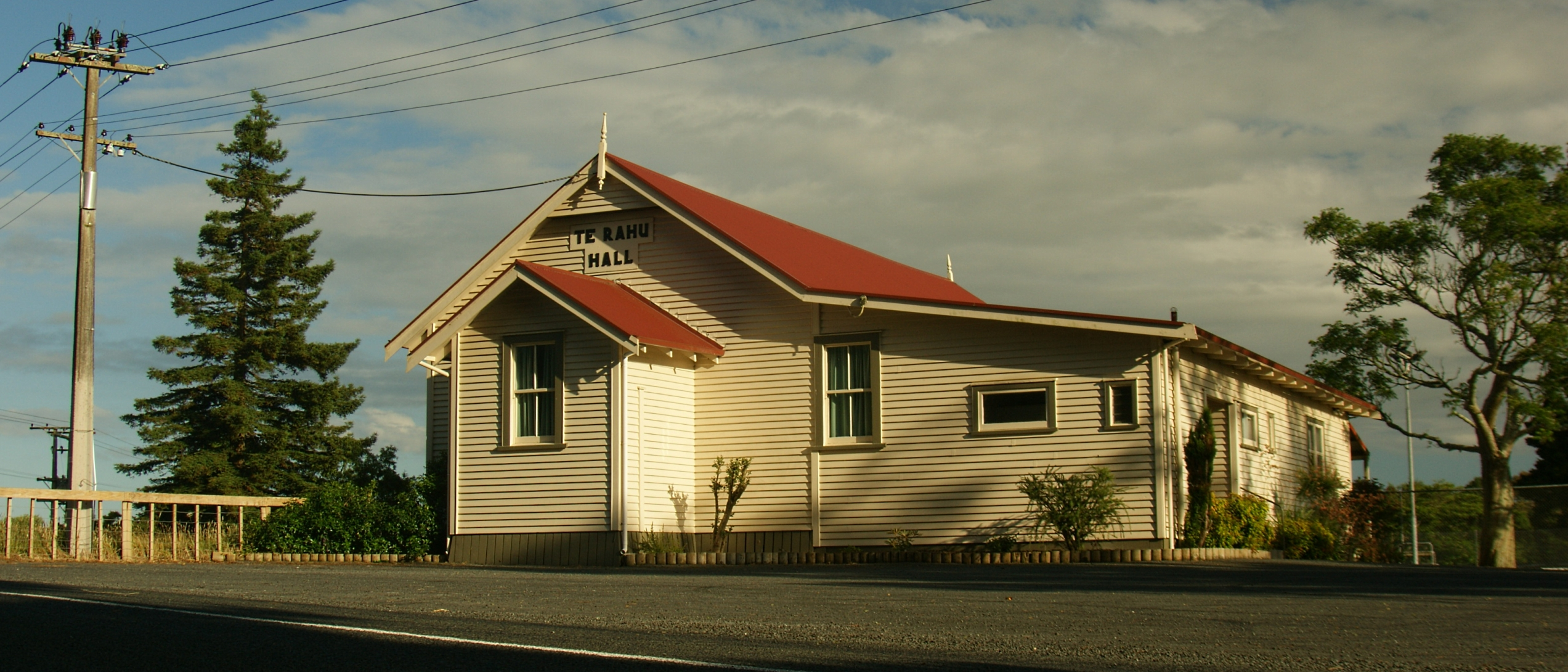
- Te Rahu Hall
- Interactive map of Te Rahu
- Coordinates: 37.978°S 175.327°E
- Country: New Zealand
- Region: Waikato
- District: Waipā District
- Ward: Pirongia-Kakepuku General Ward; Te Awamutu-Kihikihi General Ward
- Community: Te Awamutu-Kihikihi Community
- Electorates: Taranaki-King Country; Hauraki-Waikato (Māori)

Government
  - Territorial Authority: Waipā District Council
  - Regional council: Waikato Regional Council
  - Mayor of Waipa: Mike Pettit
  - Taranaki-King Country MP: Barbara Kuriger
  - Hauraki-Waikato MP: Hana-Rawhiti Maipi-Clarke

Area
  - Territorial: 22.14 km^{2} (8.55 sq mi)

Population (2023 Census)
  - Territorial: 489
  - Density: 22.1/km^{2} (57.2/sq mi)
- Time zone: UTC+12 (NZST)
  - Summer (DST): UTC+13 (NZDT)

Te Rahu is a rural locality in the Waipā District and Waikato region of New Zealand's North Island.

It is located south of Ōhaupō and north of Te Awamutu, on State Highway 3.

Lake Ngaroto is northwest of the locality.

== History ==
The Battle of Hingakākā was fought west of Te Rahu in the late 18th or early 19th centuries.

Te Rahu was established after the Invasion of the Waikato of 1863–64, and described as a thriving village in 1867.

Farming in Te Rahu was more varied than other settlements in the area: two German settlers, Messrs Karl lived on the Overdale estate and farmed bees, an acacia farm was managed by a Mr Storey. Some settlers tried farming Monterey pines but this was not very profitable in comparison to the other ventures.

A school was operating by 1878 and continued until at least 1939 but was gone by 1943.

The Te Rahu District Hall Society was incorporated in 1905 and the design of the building's design matches the period; however, an article in the New Zealand Herald from 1927 report the opening of a new hall in Te Rahu.

== Demographics ==
Te Rahu settlement and its surrounds cover 22.14 km^{2} (8.55 sq mi). The settlement is part of the larger Te Rahu statistical area.

Historical population for Te Rahu and surrounds
Year	Pop.	±% p.a.
2013	423	—
2018	492	+3.07%
2023	489	−0.12%

Te Rahu had a population of 489 in the 2023 New Zealand census, a decrease of 3 people (−0.6%) since the 2018 census, and an increase of 66 people (15.6%) since the 2013 census. There were 246 males, 243 females, and 6 people of other genders in 189 dwellings. 3.1% of people identified as LGBTIQ+. There were 90 people (18.4%) aged under 15 years, 66 (13.5%) aged 15 to 29, 228 (46.6%) aged 30 to 64, and 111 (22.7%) aged 65 or older.

People could identify as more than one ethnicity. The results were 92.0% European (Pākehā); 15.3% Māori; 2.5% Asian; 1.8% Middle Eastern, Latin American and African New Zealanders (MELAA); and 7.4% other, which includes people giving their ethnicity as "New Zealander". English was spoken by 98.8%, Māori by 1.2%, and other languages by 5.5%. No language could be spoken by 1.2% (e.g. too young to talk). The percentage of people born overseas was 9.2, compared with 28.8% nationally.

Religious affiliations were 31.9% Christian, 0.6% New Age, and 1.8% other religions. People who answered that they had no religion were 57.1%, and 8.6% of people did not answer the census question.

Of those at least 15 years old, 66 (16.5%) people had a bachelor's or higher degree, 228 (57.1%) had a post-high school certificate or diploma, and 99 (24.8%) people exclusively held high school qualifications. 69 people (17.3%) earned over $100,000 compared to 12.1% nationally. The employment status of those at least 15 was 210 (52.6%) full-time, 69 (17.3%) part-time, and 9 (2.3%) unemployed.

=== Te Rahu statistical area ===
Te Rahu statistical area covers 54.04 km^{2} (20.86 sq mi) and had an estimated population of 880 as of June 2025, with a population density of 16 people per km^{2}.

Historical population for the statistical area
Year	Pop.	±% p.a.
2006	906	—
2013	765	−2.39%
2018	837	+1.82%
2023	855	+0.43%
The 2006 population is for a larger area of 55.23 km^{2}. Source:

Te Rahu statistical area had a population of 855 in the 2023 New Zealand census, an increase of 18 people (2.2%) since the 2018 census, and an increase of 90 people (11.8%) since the 2013 census. There were 438 males, 417 females, and 3 people of other genders in 318 dwellings. 2.5% of people identified as LGBTIQ+. The median age was 41.3 years (compared with 38.1 years nationally). There were 171 people (20.0%) aged under 15 years, 111 (13.0%) aged 15 to 29, 417 (48.8%) aged 30 to 64, and 156 (18.2%) aged 65 or older.

People could identify as more than one ethnicity. The results were 90.5% European (Pākehā); 13.7% Māori; 1.1% Pasifika; 5.3% Asian; 0.4% Middle Eastern, Latin American and African New Zealanders (MELAA); and 4.2% other, which includes people giving their ethnicity as "New Zealander". English was spoken by 97.5%, Māori by 1.4%, and other languages by 7.0%. No language could be spoken by 1.4% (e.g. too young to talk). New Zealand Sign Language was known by 0.4%. The percentage of people born overseas was 14.4, compared with 28.8% nationally.

Religious affiliations were 29.8% Christian, 1.4% Hindu, 0.4% Māori religious beliefs, 0.7% New Age, and 2.1% other religions. People who answered that they had no religion were 58.2%, and 7.4% of people did not answer the census question.

Of those at least 15 years old, 126 (18.4%) people had a bachelor's or higher degree, 399 (58.3%) had a post-high school certificate or diploma, and 162 (23.7%) people exclusively held high school qualifications. The median income was $51,600, compared with $41,500 nationally. 96 people (14.0%) earned over $100,000 compared to 12.1% nationally. The employment status of those at least 15 was 381 (55.7%) full-time, 126 (18.4%) part-time, and 9 (1.3%) unemployed.
