= NZR G class =

NZR G class may refer to one of two classes of locomotives formerly used on New Zealand Railways:

- NZR G class (1874)
- NZR G class (1928)
