= Newmarket Workshops =

New Zealand Railways maintenance depot

Coordinates: 36.869899°S 174.778415°E

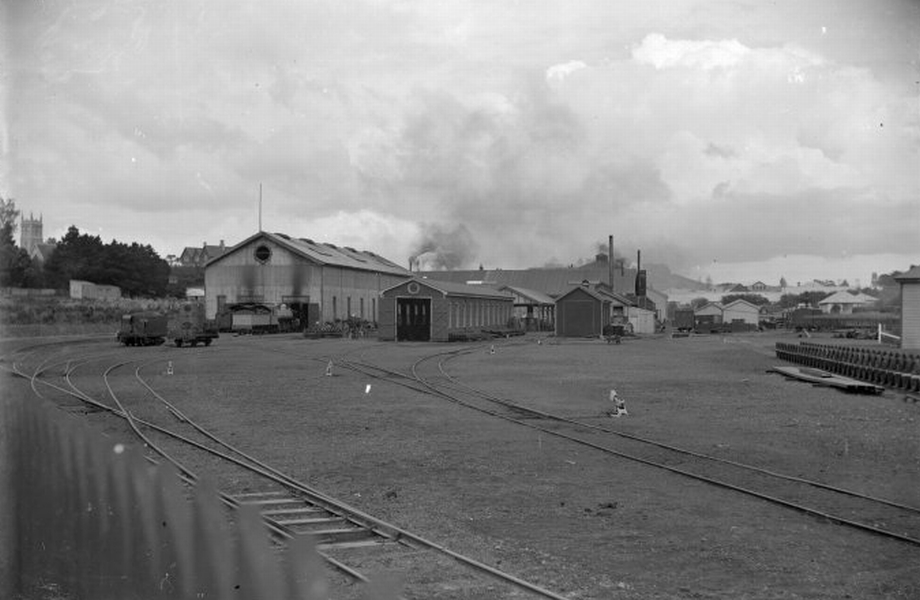
The workshops in 1909.

The Newmarket Workshops in Auckland were a major New Zealand Railways Department facility, one of 13 workshops nationwide. It was one of two main railway workshops of Auckland, used mainly for maintenance; the older facility at Newmarket was replaced in 1929 by Otahuhu Workshops.

== History ==
=== First Workshops ===
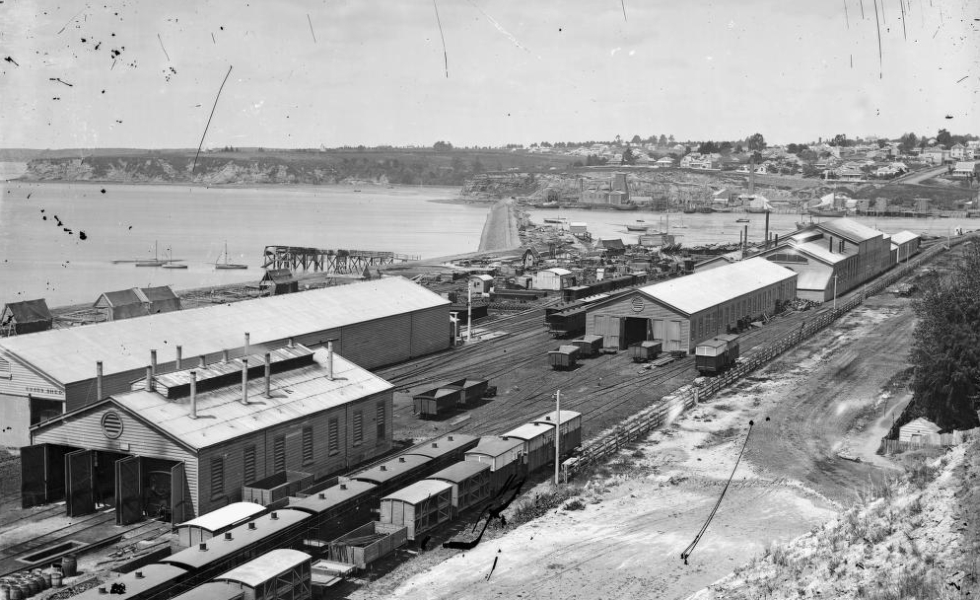
The original site between what today is the east of the Auckland CBD and Parnell.

The original Auckland Railway Workshops constructed in 1875 consisted of buildings for machining and blacksmithing work, carriage maintenance, locomotive maintenance and a boiler house. Due to the unsuitable site on which the facilities were constructed, at the beginning of the Northclimb to Newmarket, there were soon plans to relocate the buildings.

=== Relocation to Newmarket ===
The Public Works Department announced on 13 October 1879 that it had purchased a suitable site for the workshops in Newmarket. Also motivating the workshop's relocation was the need to use the land on which the existing buildings were sited to rearrange the yard for the new Newmarket railway station.

The contract for construction of the new workshops was signed in March 1883 and completed by 30 November 1883. Relocation of plant and workshop staff to the new site occurred between October 1884 and February 1885. The new site was on both sides of Remuera Road, from Mahuru Street in the south to just north of the junction with the North Auckland Line, and bounded by Broadway on the western side, and Middleton Road on the east.

Up to 1908, while the Auckland section was isolated from the rest of the North Island rail network, the workshops were responsible for the construction of new carriages and the maintenance of all rolling stock used on the section. This remained the status quo until 1912 when the Auckland Harbour Board initiated a reclamation project that included an area reaching out to Campbell’s Point. Included in this project was a plan to extend King’s Drive (Quay Street) out to the point, but for this to happen the locomotive depot had to be moved as it straddled the road. Following a Harbour Board request, the Railways Department purchased land at Newmarket. Because the land was in a small gully, extensive earthworks were required to prepare the site, which was done by hand with the aid of horse-drawn muck trucks.

Then plans to use the new site for the locomotive running shed were abandoned. The idea of moving the engine sheds to Newmarket from the Auckland Railway Station was mooted as early as 1912, and cited as one of the reasons why the Parnell Tunnel would have to be duplicated. General Manager E. H. Hiley reported on 1 August 1914 that because its reclaimed land at Mechanics Bay would all be required for an extension of the station yard and other traffic sidings, the locomotive depot would be sited on reclaimed land in Hobson Bay and that the land that had been designated for this purpose at Newmarket would be used to extend the workshops. The extension of the Newmarket site was delayed by the war, but the land was eventually used for the construction of a carriage and wagon workshop, which freed space in some of the other workshops for locomotive maintenance. It was reported on 21 July 1916 that work on the new workshops was well underway, and the new buildings were ready for use towards the end of the year. They included a timber drying shed, a wood mill, a carriage and wagon shop, a lifting shop, a blacksmiths' shop, a tarpaulin shop and a trimming shop.

=== Fay-Raven Commission, 1925 ===
In 1924, a Royal Commission consisting of two English railwaymen, Sir Sam Fay and Sir Vincent Raven, was asked to report on New Zealand Railways. They made several recommendations regarding workshops around the country, particularly for Auckland and Wellington. With respect to the Newmarket site they were especially critical of the woodworking and machine shop, which was too small, the yard arrangement was inadequate and the separation of various facilities by Remuera Road necessitated shunting through a busy and congested yard, resulting in costly delays.

The Minister of Railways reported in 1928 that it was possible to extend the existing workshops at Hillside and Addington in the South Island, but that the sites of the two main workshops in the North Island, at Newmarket and Petone, were hopelessly inadequate and that land was to be acquired at Otahuhu and Lower Hutt respectively to replace them.

=== Otahuhu Workshops ===
The new Otahuhu Workshops were opened after Christmas 1928, and Newmarket Workshops closed.

== Maintenance ==
Unlike the other main centre workshops, locomotives were not constructed or rebuilt at Newmarket or Otahuhu, which specialised in repair and maintenance work. The only exceptions were one F^{A} class (F^{A} 276) in 1896, and nine rebuilds of F and L classes (Lloyd page 188).

An experimental MacEwan-Pratt Railcar was built at Newmarket in 1912, but it did not prove satisfactory and was dismantled in 1913.

== Today ==
New roads and urban development have obliterated most traces of the workshops.

== See also ==
- Otahuhu Workshops (replaced Newmarket Workshops)
- Addington Workshops
- Hillside Workshops
- Hutt Workshops
- New Zealand Railways Department
