= Rail transport in New Zealand =

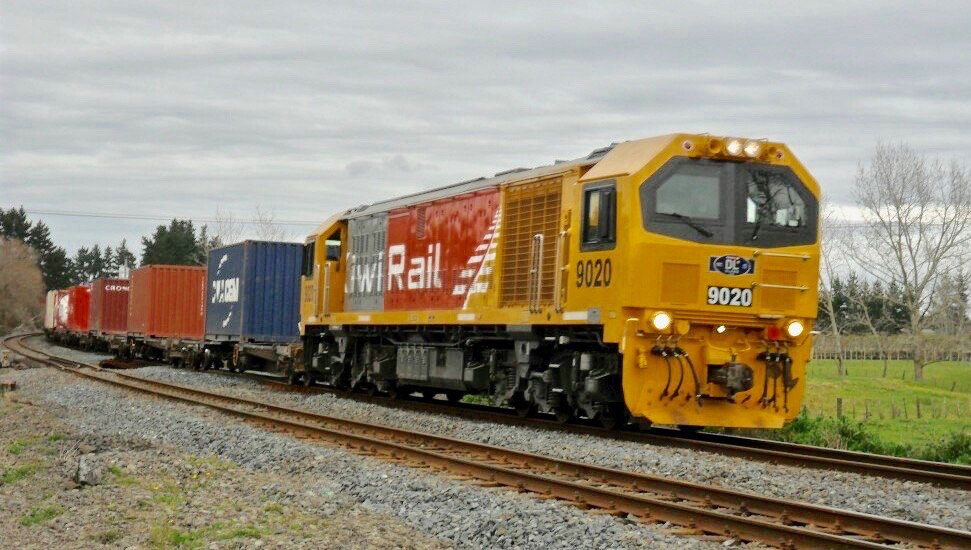
- KiwiRail DL9020 on MetroPort train MP4 at Papakura, Auckland, in 2011

Operation
- National railway: KiwiRail
- Infrastructure company: New Zealand Railways Corporation (land); KiwiRail (track); Dunedin Railways; Various heritage operators
- Major operators: Auckland One Rail; Great Journeys New Zealand; Transdev Wellington; Dunedin Railways

Statistics
- Ridership: 35 million a year
- Freight: 19m tonnes (2018–19); 4.49m net tonne kilometres (2012–13) 16% of total freight movements annually.

System length
- Total: 4,375.5 km (2,718.8 mi)
- Double track: 1,332 km (828 mi)
- Electrified: 1,000 km (620 mi)
- Freight only: 2,025 km (1,258 mi)

Track gauge
- Main: 1,067 mm (3 ft 6 in)
- 1,067 mm (3 ft 6 in): 4,128 km (2,565 mi)

Electrification
- Main: 25 kV AC overhead lines
- 25 kV AC: 488 km (303 mi)
- 1500 V DC: 101 km (63 mi)

Features
- No. of tunnels: 150
- Tunnel length: 80 km (50 mi)
- Longest tunnel: Freight Kaimai Tunnel; 9,025 m (29,610 ft); Passenger Rimutaka Tunnel 8,930.25 m (29,298.7 ft)
- No. of bridges: 1,787
- Longest bridge: Freight Rakaia river bridge 1,743 m (5,719 ft); Passenger Waiau river bridge 930.25 m (3,052.0 ft)
- Max elevation: 1,600 m (5,200 ft) at Pokaka, North Island Main Trunk

Rail transport in New Zealand is an integral part of New Zealand's transport network, with a nationwide network of 4,375.5 km (2,718.8 mi) of track linking most major cities in the North and South Islands, connected by inter-island rail and road ferries. Rail transport in New Zealand has a particular focus on bulk freight exports and imports, with 19 million net tonnes moved by rail annually, accounting for more than half of rail revenue.

Rail transport played an important role in the opening up and development of the hinterland outside of New Zealand's predominantly dispersed and coastal settlements. Starting with the Ferrymead Railway in 1863, most public railway lines were short, built by provincial governments and connected major centres to their nearest seaport (such as Christchurch and its port at Lyttelton Harbour). From the 1870s, the focus shifted to building a nationwide network linking major centres, especially during the Vogel era of railway construction following the abolition of the provinces. Narrow gauge of 3ft 6in (1,067mm) was adopted nationally. Bush tramways or light industrial railways sprang up connecting to the national network as it expanded. Railways became centrally controlled as a government department under the name New Zealand Government Railways, or New Zealand Railways Department (NZR), and land transport was heavily regulated from 1931 by the Transport Licensing Act 1931. NZR expanded into other transport modes, especially with the Railways Road Services, inter-island ferries and Rail Air service. NZR also had an extensive network of workshops. By 1981, NZR employed 22,000 staff.

In 1982, NZR was corporatised as the New Zealand Railways Corporation and restructured, especially following the deregulation of land transport in 1983. The Corporation became a state-owned enterprise (SOE) in 1987, required to run at a profit. In 1991, the rail, inter-island ferry and infrastructure businesses of the Railways Corporation were split off into a new SOE, New Zealand Rail Limited, which was in turn privatised in 1993 and renamed Tranz Rail in 1995. The parcels and bus service business units were also privatised, and the Railways Corporation continued to dispose of surplus land. The central government renationalised first the Auckland metro railway network in 2001, then the rest of the network in 2004, and finally the rail and ferry operations in 2008, creating a new SOE, KiwiRail.

Since 2008, services are primarily provided by KiwiRail and focused on bulk freight, with a small number of tourist-oriented passenger services, such as the TranzAlpine, Coastal Pacific and Northern Explorer operated under the "Great Journeys" brand by KiwiRail. Urban passenger rail services exist only in Auckland and Greater Wellington and are operated under contract to Auckland Council and Greater Wellington Regional Council by Auckland One Rail and Transdev Wellington, respectively. Mainland Rail is planning a commuter passenger service trial in Christchurch from 2027, while Dunedin Railways operates tourist trains out of Dunedin. A number of heritage operators run charter specials from time to time.

Rail in New Zealand has received significant and ongoing government investment since renationalisation in 2008, with the two urban rail systems being upgraded. In 2021, the government launched the New Zealand Rail Plan, with funding for rail projects to come from National Land Transport Fund (NLTF), with KiwiRail remaining an SOE but paying Track User Charges (TUCs) to use the network.

== History ==
New Zealand railway network 1863–2019

=== Provincial period (1863–1876) ===
Railway lines were initially constructed by the provincial governments of New Zealand from 1863 onwards. New Zealand's first public railway was opened in that year, running the short distance between Christchurch and the wharf at Ferrymead and built by the Canterbury Provincial Railways. The Canterbury Provincial Railways were built to the broad gauge of 5 ft 3 in (1,600 mm). In February 1867, Southland Province opened a branch from Invercargill to Bluff to the international standard gauge of 4 ft 8 1/2 in (1,435 mm).

==== Gauge ====
3 ft 6 in (1,067 mm) gauge (internationally known as narrow gauge) was chosen due to the need to cross mountainous terrain in the country's interior and the lower cost of construction.

Due to multiple rail gauges being used by railways built by provincial governments, the prospect of a similar break of gauge problem to Australia (where narrow, standard and broad gauge railways were built by different colonial governments) became a major political issue as the provincial railways expanded. In 1867, the House of Representatives formed a select committee to investigate the issue, composed of members of parliament from all across New Zealand. The select committee heard evidence from railway engineers who proposed a number of options, including building main trunk lines at standard gauge, while using narrow gauge for branch lines. Engineers cited the experience of Queensland's railways, which had adopted narrow gauge in 1864. The select committee did not recommend making railway gauge uniform across the country, but did recommend narrow gauge if that were to happen, stating "narrow gauge appears calculated to carry all the traffic for many years, and would possess the advantage of greater cheapness in construction; for this reason railways of this character should be encouraged."

By 1869, 78 kilometres (48 mi) of provincial railways were open, with another 30 kilometres (19 mi) under construction, mainly in Southland and Canterbury. Parliamentary debate focused on the question of whether the provincial railways could keep their wider gauges, while narrow gauge railways were to be built. Member of the House of Representatives (MHR) James Crowe Richmond, who had worked on the Great Western Railway and in railways in Belgium, became the most prominent advocate for a uniform narrow gauge nationwide. In late 1869 Francis Dillon Bell MHR and Issac Featherston MHR (also superintendent of the Wellington Province) were in London to negotiate the retention of Imperial British forces then in New Zealand fighting the New Zealand Wars. They were also tasked with investigating a uniform railway gauge for New Zealand. In 1870, James Macandrew MHR called for another select committee to investigate the need for a law to require one uniform railway gauge for the entire colony. Information from Featherston and Dillon Bell reached Wellington in August 1870, and the second select committee to investigate whether a law was required for gauge uniformity met from that month. By majority, the select committee reported back to the House in favour of narrow gauge being adopted as the uniform gauge nationwide, and allowing Canterbury Provincial Railways to continue to expand its broad-gauge network, with dual-gauge track where narrow gauge met broad gauge. William Sefton Moorhouse MHR, former superintendent of Canterbury Province and advocate for broad gauge, and William Rolleston MHR, at the time superintendent of Canterbury Province, were in the minority on the select committee opposing the legislation. Despite this opposition, Parliament passed the Railways Act 1870 in September 1870, requiring all railways to be built or converted to narrow gauge, with an exemption of the Christchurch-Rakaia section of Canterbury Provincial Railways. Sections of the Canterbury railway network were converted to dual-gauge, including Rakaia to Lyttelton, with new branch lines built to narrow gauge. By 1878, all of the broad gauge network had been converted to narrow gauge.

==== Vogel era ====
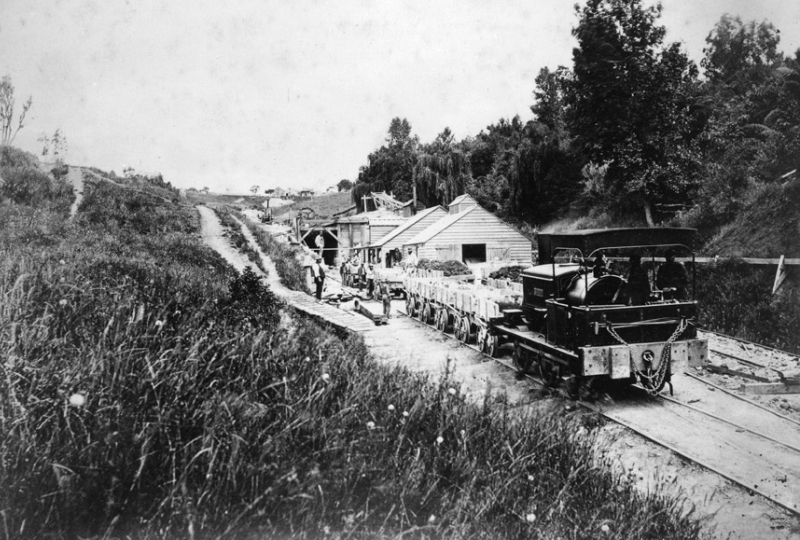
The first Parnell Tunnel under construction on the Auckland-Drury line in c. 1873. The line was originally started by the Auckland Province but completed by the central government.

From 1870, the central government of Sir Julius Vogel proposed infrastructure including a national railway network to be funded by overseas loans of £10 million, under the guise of the "Great Public Works Policy". Settlement and land sales to immigrants from Britain resulting from this infrastructure investment would pay for the scheme. The first narrow-gauge line was opened on 1 January 1873 in the Otago Province, the Port Chalmers Branch under the auspices of the Dunedin and Port Chalmers Railway Company Limited. Auckland's first railway, between Auckland and Onehunga, opened in December 1873. Vogel also arranged for Brogdens of England to undertake several rail construction contracts, to be built by "Brogden's Navvies" recruited in England.

Vogel's vision of a national network connecting major centres in New Zealand was never realised. Despite the abolition of the provinces in 1876, parochial interests often overcame national interests, and the government approved and built many branch lines to lightly populated hinterlands, instead of prioritising interprovincial main trunks. As a result, a number of routes first proposed by Vogel in 1870 were still not complete by 1920.

==== Tramways and Bush tramways ====
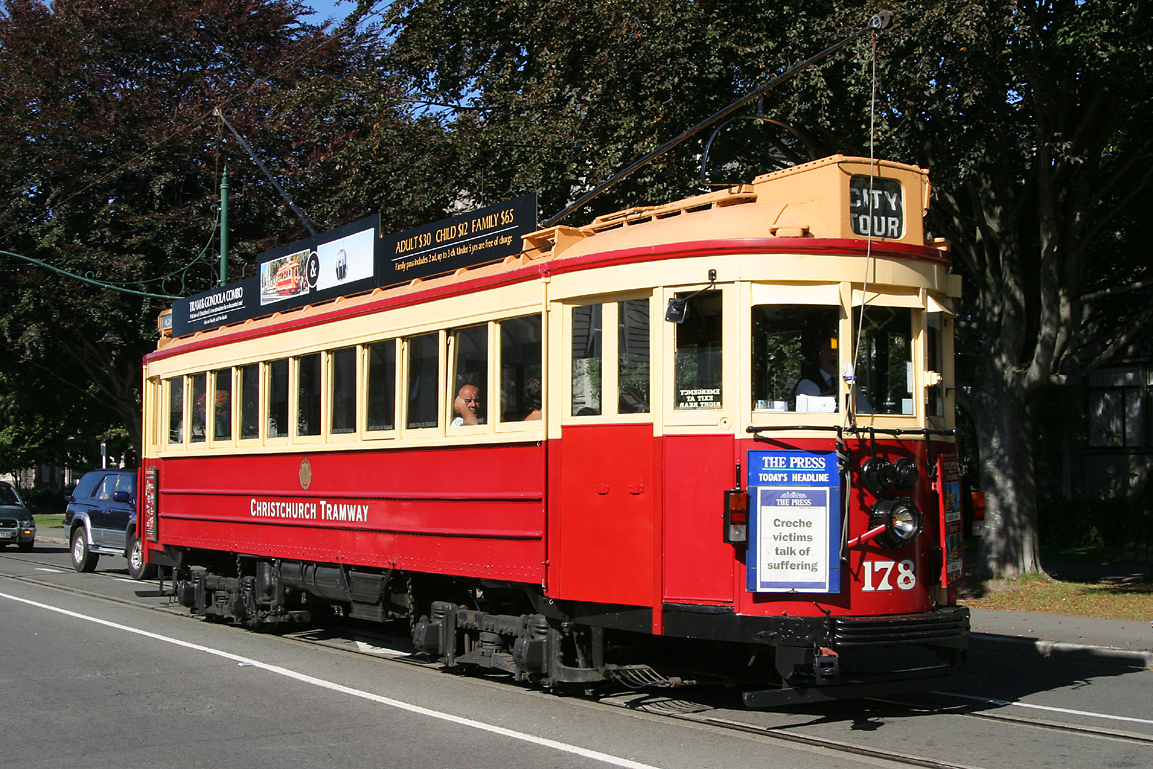
Vintage Christchurch Boon-built Tram No 178 on the Christchurch Tramway

Bush tramways were usually privately owned light railways, usually for logging operations. Usually built with light tracks and light-weight rolling stock, bush tramways were usually connected to the national railway network and were often moved as the forest was cleared. The last bush tramway for logging native bush closed in 1974. Bush tramways should not be confused with urban street-cars, known in New Zealand as trams. In the 20th century, New Zealand cities had extensive tram networks. Most of these networks closed mid-century, being replaced by buses. As of 2026 there are proposals in Auckland and Wellington for light rail networks, however, New Zealand has no rapid transit metros.

=== Central Government control (1876–1982) ===
Following the abolition of the provinces in 1876, railway lines were controlled by the central government, originally under the Public Works Department, and from 1880 under the New Zealand Railways Department. A Minister of Railways was responsible for the department and was a member of the New Zealand Cabinet.

A few private companies built railways in New Zealand, including the New Zealand Midland Railway Company, Wellington and Manawatu Railway Company, Waimea Plains Railway, and Thames Valley and Rotorua Railway Company. Only the Wellington and Manawatu Railway Company, nationalised in 1908, achieved any measure of success, with the rest being purchased by the Government before completion of their intended railway lines. One exception to this rule was the Ohai Railway Board in Southland, which was owned by the State Mines department and a local county council until its dissolution in 1990.

The first major route was completed between Christchurch and Dunedin in 1878, later extended to Invercargill the following year. The North Island Main Trunk, linking capital city Wellington with the largest city Auckland, opened in 1908 after 23 years of construction. At the network's peak in 1952, about 100 branch lines were operating. Large-scale closures of branch railway lines began in the 1960s and 1970s. The network was initially protected from road transport competition under the Transport Licensing Act 1931, but this protection was gradually eased until its total abolition in 1983, along with the deregulation of the land transport industry.

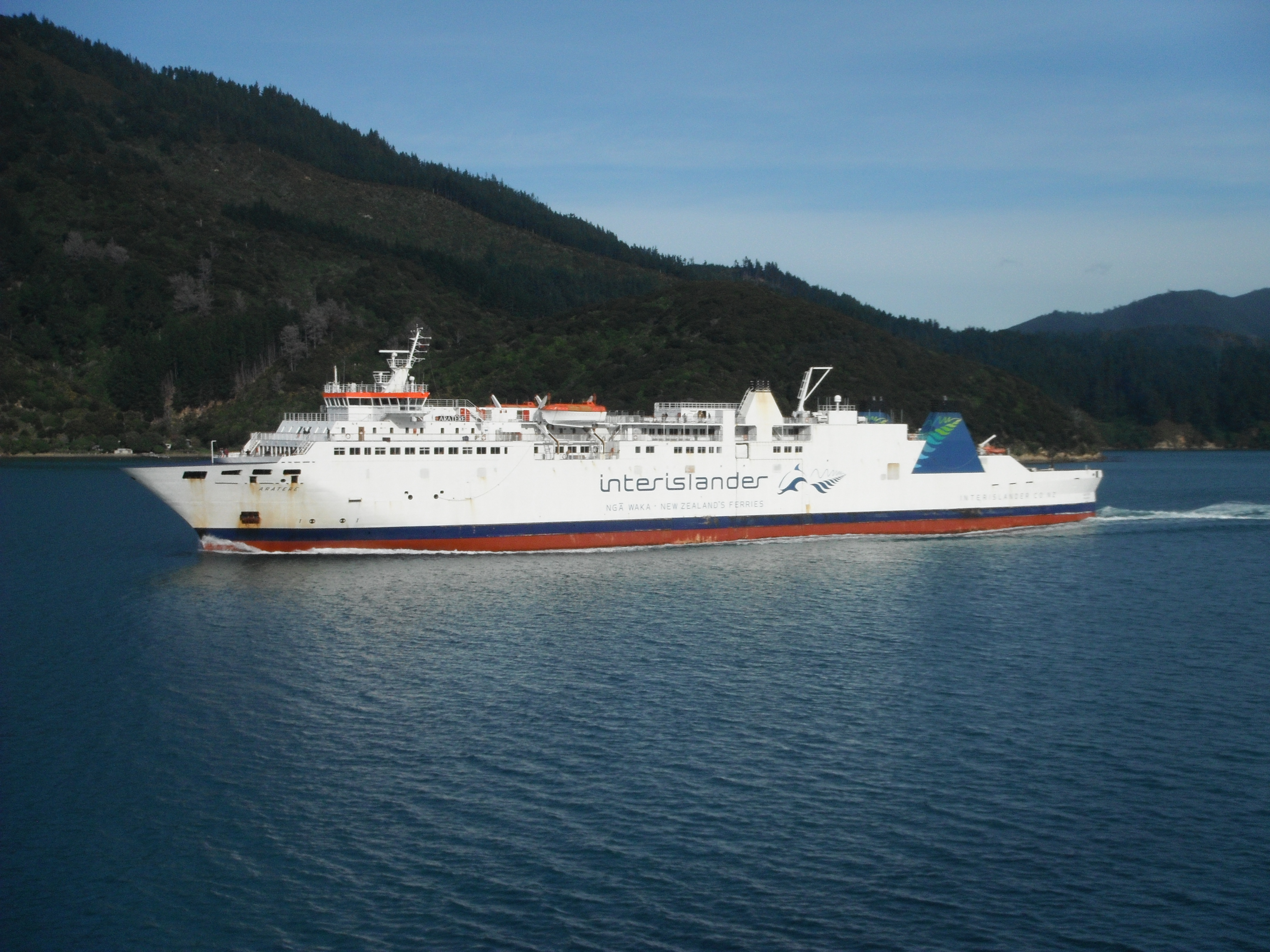
Aratere in the Tory Channel, June 2018. The rail ferries operated by KiwiRail under the brand "Interisland Line" connect the networks of both the North and South Islands.

The networks of the North and South Islands were independent of one another until the introduction of the inter-island roll-on roll-off rail ferry service in 1962 by the Railways Department, now branded the Interislander.

=== Corporatised ownership (1982–1993) ===
In 1982, the Railways Department was corporatised into a new entity at the same time land transport was deregulated. The Railways Department became the New Zealand Railways Corporation. The Corporation embarked on a major restructuring, laying off thousands of staff and cutting unprofitable services. After the 1983 land transport deregulation, there was a substantial rationalisation of freight facilities; many stations and smaller yards were closed and freight train services were sped up, increased in length and made heavier, with the removal of guard's vans in 1987 and the gradual elimination of older rolling stock, particularly four-wheeled wagons.

In 1987, the Railways Corporation became a state-owned enterprise, required to make a profit. In 1990, the core rail operations of the Corporation were transferred to New Zealand Rail Limited, another state-owned enterprise, with the Corporation retaining non-core assets which were gradually disposed of, including a significant land portfolio. In many cases, the Corporation did not dispose of land due to Treaty of Waitangi claims and has continued to manage land.

=== Private ownership (1993–2004) ===
New Zealand Rail Limited was privatised in 1993. The company was sold for $328.3 million to a consortium led by New Zealand merchant bank Fay Richwhite and US regional railroad Wisconsin Central Ltd. In 1995 the new owners adopted the name Tranz Rail and listed the company on the New Zealand stock market and NASDAQ. Rail freight volumes increased between 1993 and 2000 from 8.5m net tonnes to 14.99m net tonnes carried annually, and then gradually fell until 2003 to 13.7m tonnes. Freight volumes then increased again to 16.1m tonnes carried annually in 2012.

Tranz Rail was accused of deliberately running down some lines through lack of maintenance. The Midland line for example, which mostly carries coal from the West Coast to Lyttelton, was assessed to be in a safe but poor state by the LTSA government safety body in 2003, and has needed major repairs.

Tranz Rail was accused of forcing freight onto the roads, and in 2002 introduced a containerisation scheme that assumed that most freight would be carried in containers on unit trains made up of fixed consists of flat deck wagons. Container loading depots were constructed at the major freight terminals. One of the reasons often cited for these policies was that the cost of using road transport to Tranz Rail was less than that of using rail because the road infrastructure is provided as a public good, whereas the rail network was a private good.

==== Government purchase of Auckland rail network ====
The government purchased the Auckland metropolitan rail network from Tranz Rail for $81 million in 2002. Tranz Rail retained time slots for freight trains, and the Auckland Regional Council was granted slots for it to contract the operation of suburban passenger trains. Auckland railway stations not already local council-owned were transferred to Auckland Regional Transport Network Limited (ARTNL), owned by the Auckland territorial authorities, which was merged with the Auckland Regional Transport Authority (ARTA), a subsidiary of the Auckland Regional Council (ARC). With the creation of the "super-city" Auckland Council in 2010, ARTA was dissolved and its role was taken over by Auckland Transport, a new council-controlled organisation.

=== Private and government ownership (2004–2008) ===
In 2003, the share price of Tranz Rail dropped to a record low on the New Zealand sharemarket, dropping 88% in value in 12 months as a result of its poor financial state and credit downgrading. The government then considered various schemes for bailing it out in return for regaining control of the rail infrastructure. Cited reasons included a "level playing field" for freight movements on road and rail, and ensuring access to the tracks for all interested parties.

Toll Holdings of Australia made a successful takeover bid for Tranz Rail, subject to an agreement to sell back the infrastructure to the government for $1. In exchange, Toll was granted exclusive use of the rail network subject to minimum freight and passenger volumes, payment of track access charges and its own investment in new rolling stock. This transaction took place in July 2004, and Tranz Rail was renamed Toll New Zealand. The government committed $200 million of taxpayer funding for deferred maintenance and capital improvements via a new subsidiary of the New Zealand Railways Corporation, ONTRACK. An interim agreement was signed by Toll NZ for track access; Toll paid a nominal track access charge while negotiating a final agreement with ONTRACK. These negotiations did not progress and eventually went to arbitration at the start of 2008.

=== Renationalisation (2008–current) ===
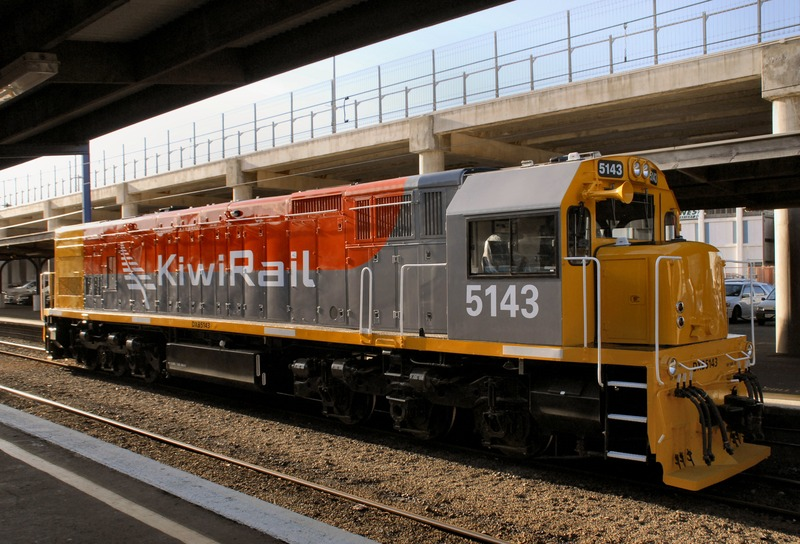
DXB 5143 at Wellington railway station on 1 July 2008 at the launch of KiwiRail

Instead of concluding a final track access agreement with Toll, in 2008 the government purchased the rail and ferry assets for $690 million, effective 1 July 2008. The new organisation created to operate services on the rail network was named KiwiRail.

Ownership of the national rail network is vested in KiwiRail Holdings Limited, with land owned by the New Zealand Railways Corporation. KiwiRail Network (formerly ONTRACK) is a division of KiwiRail that maintains and upgrades the rail infrastructure and is responsible for the control of the network (i.e. train control and signalling). Other rail operating companies using the rail network include Auckland One Rail and Transdev Wellington, who operate suburban services in Auckland and Wellington, respectively, and Dunedin Railways Limited (trading as Dunedin Railway Station), who operate tourist trains out of Dunedin.

KiwiRail released in 2010 a 10-year turnaround plan for the rail industry. This was accompanied by significant government investment in KiwiRail of over $2.1 billion during the period 2008 to February 2017. In May 2017, the government announced a further $450 million capital injection and that KiwiRail would be subject to a further significant review. The plan has been significantly undermined by the Christchurch earthquakes of 2010 and 2011, the 2016 Kaikōura earthquake, Pike River Mine disaster, coal price collapse, coal miner Solid Energy going into voluntary administration in 2016 and major motive power issues with the new DL class of locomotives. Nevertheless, significant improvements in freight volumes have followed (other than with coal).

Two of KiwiRail's major customers, Mainfreight and Fonterra, also invested heavily in rail-related infrastructure. Mainfreight allocated $60 million for investment in new railhead depots, while Fonterra invested $130m in a new rail hub complex in Hamilton and another planned for Mosgiel.

==== New Zealand Rail Plan ====
In 2019, the government began a "Future of Rail" review, and in December 2019 released a draft New Zealand Rail Plan, outlining changes to the rail transport industry. The draft plan proposes a number of major changes, the most significant being future funding of the rail network through the National Land Transport Fund (NLTF).

The final plan was launched in April 2021, confirming funding for rail projects from the NLTF, and the use of Track User Charges (TUCs) for users of the rail network, including KiwiRail. Some specific projects were also outlined as possibilities:

- Reopening the Stratford–Okahukura line;
- Completing double-tracking of the North Island Main Trunk between Auckland and Hamilton;
- Increasing axle weight between Auckland and Tauranga to 20 tonnes plus;
- Standardising loop lengths from Palmerston North to Waikanae;
- Increase axle weight to 18 tonnes plus in the South Island.

=== City Rail Link ===
The City Rail Link (CRL) is an underground rapid transit system that forms an integrated part of the overground Auckland commuter railway network. It consists of pair of 3.45-kilometre-long (2.14 mi) tunnels underneath Auckland's city centre, extending the North Island Main Trunk railway line from its former terminus at Waitematā Station (formerly Britomart) to a junction with the North Auckland Line at Maungawhau Station.

Planned since 2013, construction began in 2018 and included two underground stations serving the city centre: Te Waihorotiu near Aotea Square and Karanga-a-Hape near Karangahape Road. Waitematā Station was converted from a terminus station into a through station, and Mount Eden station was replaced by Maungawhau Station, a station with four platforms to serve as an interchange between the CRL line and the Western Line.

=== Te Huia ===
Te Huia is a passenger train service connecting the major cities of Hamilton and Auckland in the North Island of New Zealand. The service is a five-year trial with subsidies from the NZ Transport Agency and Waikato local authorities. The opening was delayed because of COVID-19 and the need to replace some rail track. A new starting date was announced, and the service began on 6 April 2021.

As of February 2026, the service is being funded by the NZ Transport Agency and Waikato Regional Council up until 30 June 2027.

=== Marsden Point Branch ===
The Marsden Point Branch is a 19 km (12 mi) branch line railway, proposed to be built in the Northland Region of New Zealand's North Island. It will diverge from the North Auckland Line at Oakleigh, south of Whangārei, and serve Northport at Marsden Point. The proposal has existed since the 1970s and land for the rail corridor is being actively purchased.

In October 2017, the new Labour–NZ First coalition government announced that it would spend $600 million on rehabilitating the North Auckland Line and building the branch at a cost of $200 million, the total works to cost $800 million. In June 2021 it was announced that the line would be built and was expected to take about 5 years. In April 2023 it was announced that KiwiRail was "progressing" the business case for the branch.

=== Third Main Line ===
The third main line was opened between Quay Park and Wiri in September 2025.

In 2020, the government announced funding for a number of rail-related infrastructure projects, mainly in the Auckland region.

== Operations ==
=== Freight ===
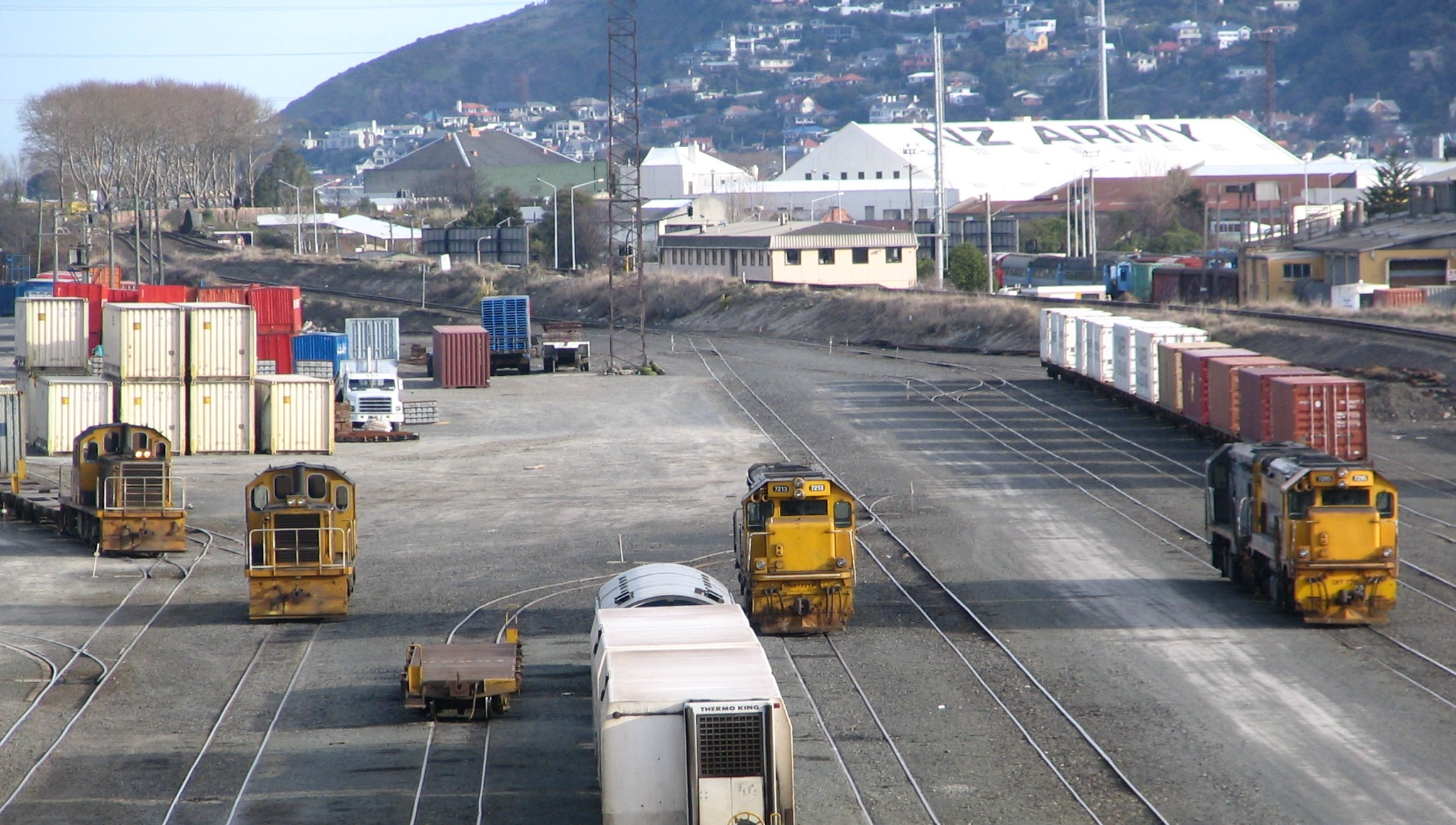
Freight marshalling yard in Dunedin, 16 August 2007. Freight makes up the bulk of KiwiRail's annual revenues.

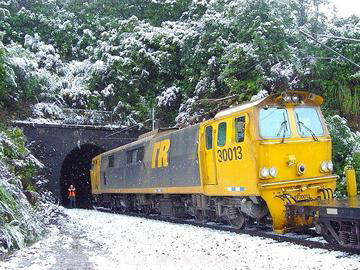
An EF class locomotive in the Tranz Rail "bumble-bee" livery hauling container wagons on the North Island Main Trunk at Raurimu Spiral in September 2006.

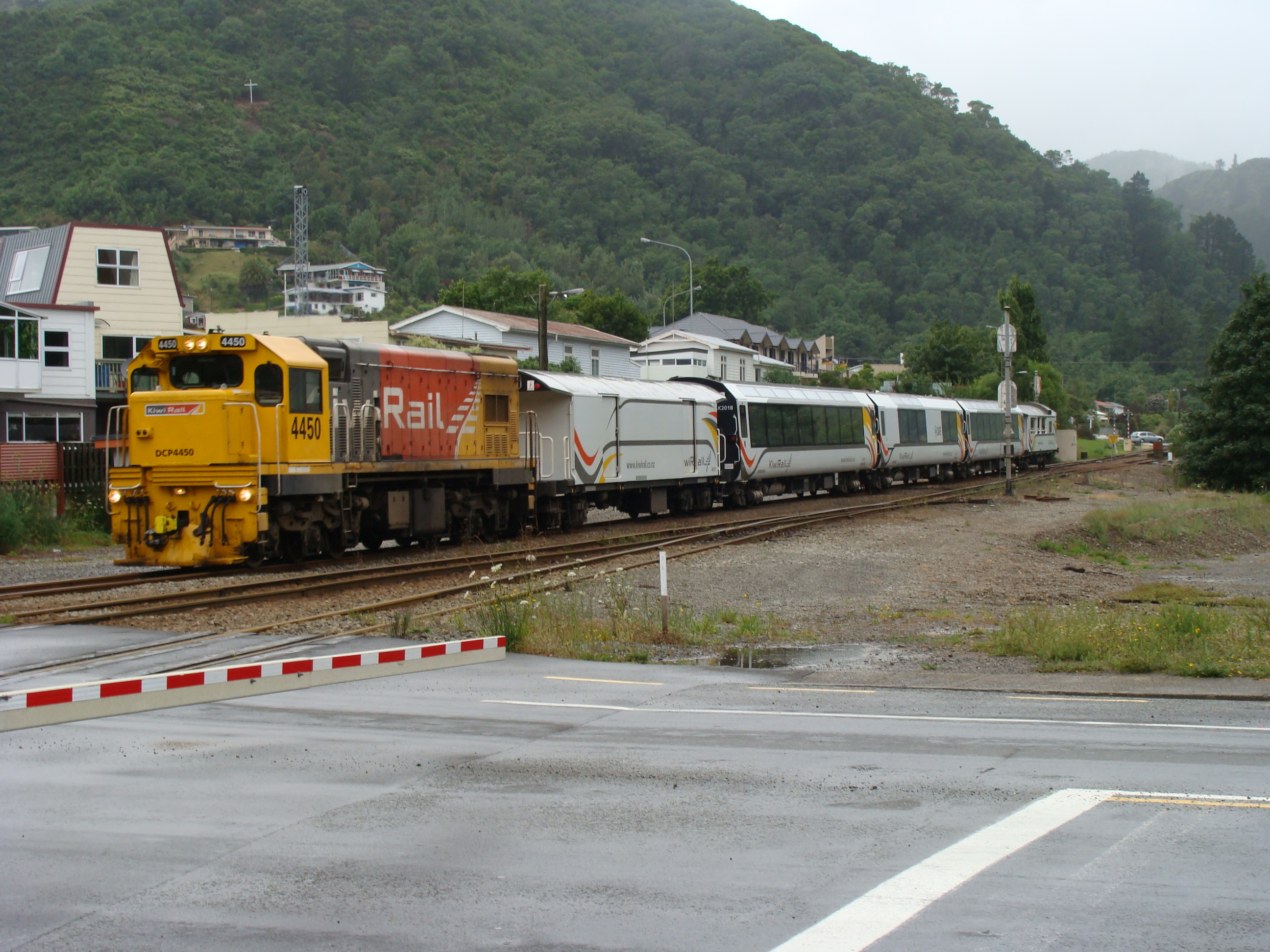
The Coastal Pacific service arriving at Picton in December 2011

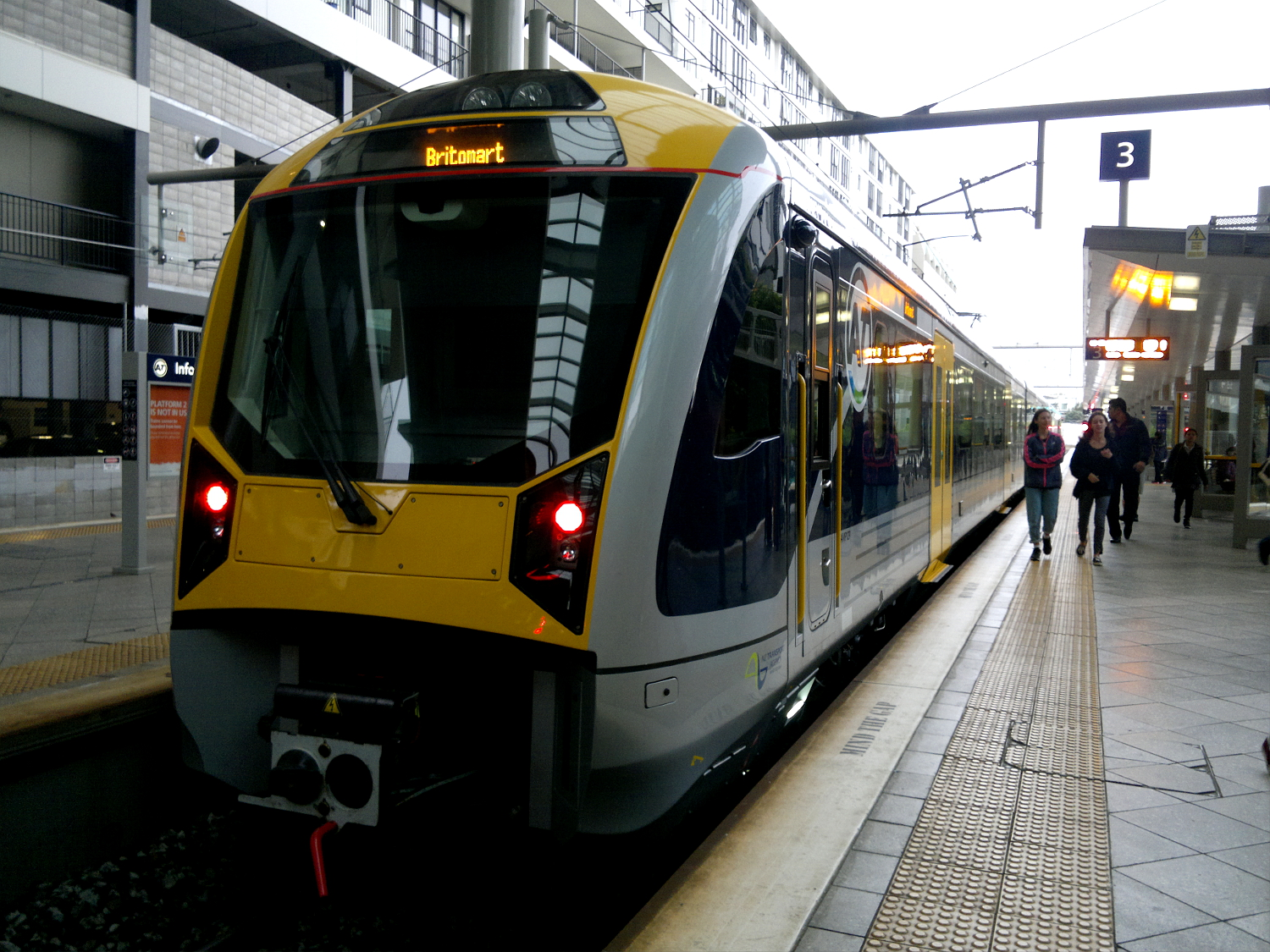
Auckland AM class electric passenger train at Newmarket station, April 2014

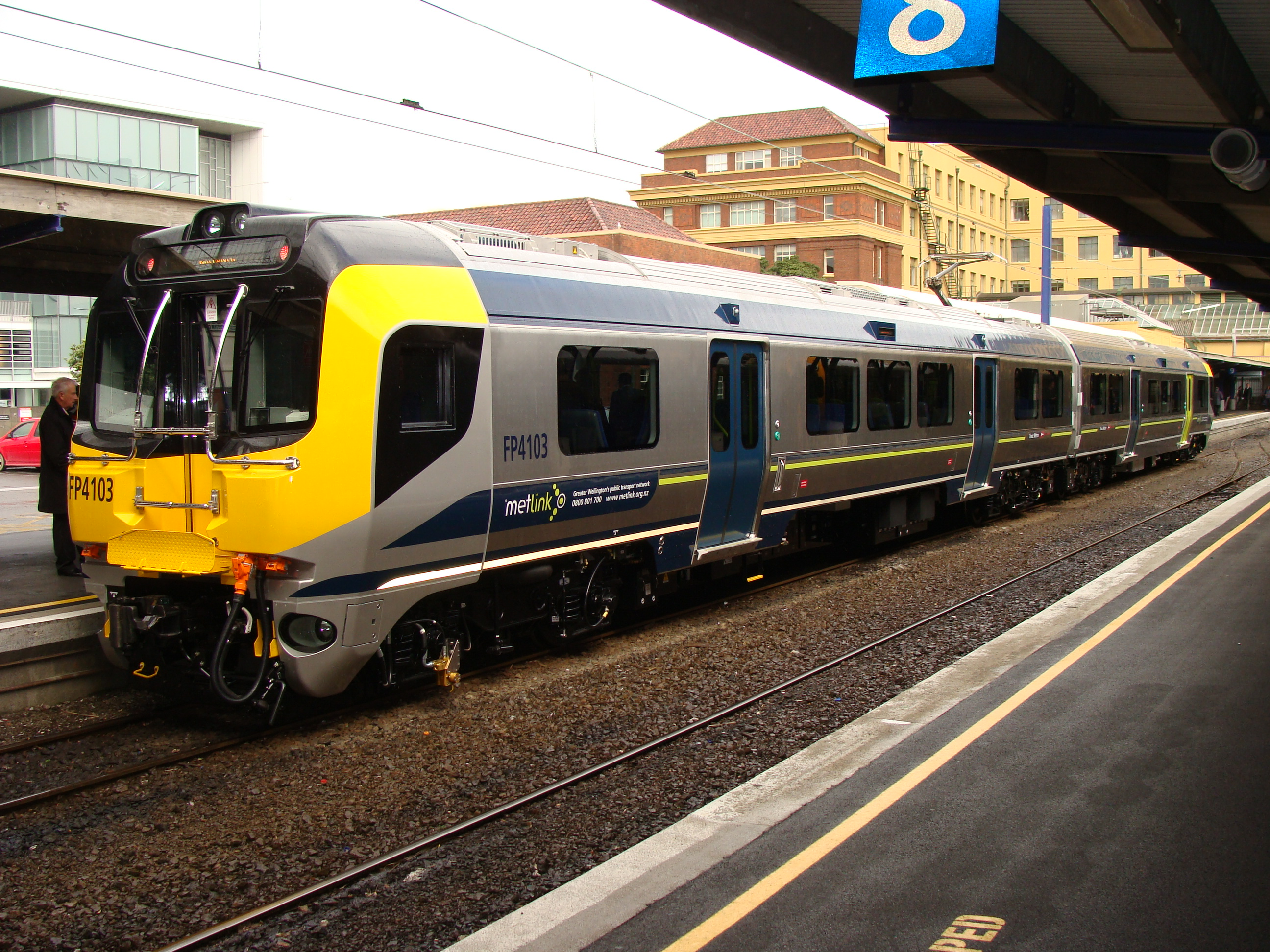
A FP/FT class "Matangi" EMU at Wellington railway station, September 2010

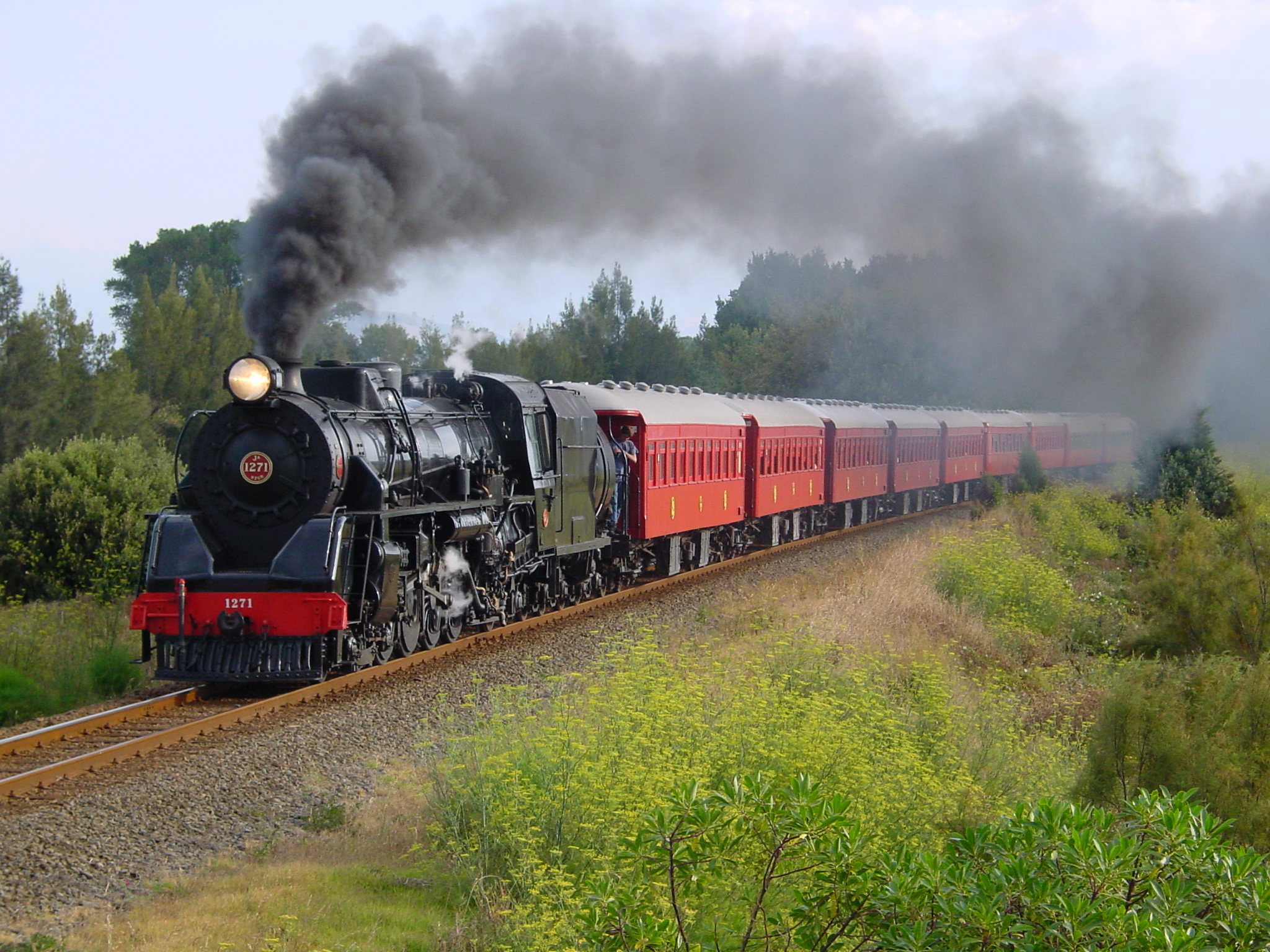
Preserved J^{A} class locomotive 1271 on an excursion at Ahuriri in February 2003

Freight is carried by KiwiRail and provides the majority of its revenue traffic. In the 2017–2018 financial year, freight contributed $350.7 million in revenue or 57% of the company's total revenue. Freight is mostly bulk traffic geared towards export industries, with general freight being largely restricted to containerised and palletised products on the trunk route. Major bulk freight includes coal, lime, steel, wood and wood products, paper pulp, dry and liquid milk, cars, fertiliser, grain and shipping containers.

Freight levels have returned to the level that they were at when the railway had a virtual monopoly on land transport, prior to 1983. In 1980 11.8 million tonnes of freight was moved by rail, in 1994 this had decreased to 9.4 million tonnes. By 1999, tonnes carried had increased to 12.9 million tonnes, slightly more than the 1975 peak. In the 2006–2007 financial year, 13.7 million tonnes of freight were carried. This equated to 3.96 million net tonne kilometres (or the number of tonnes of traffic gained in 2008–2009 compared to the amount of traffic hauled in the 2006–2007 year).

In recent years, the amount of freight moved by rail has increased substantially and has started to gain market share in non-bulk areas as well. Freight on the North Island Main Trunk line between Auckland and Palmerston North saw an increase of 39% in freight volumes between 2006 and 2007. The five daily trains on the 667 km line reduced truck volumes on the route by around 120 per day.

A 2008 study by the Ministry of Transport predicted that by 2031 rail freight volumes would increase to 23 million tonnes per annum or 70% on the 2006–2007 financial year. In 2018 the same report found freight levels had increased by 17% between 2007 and 2012.

=== Long-distance passenger services ===
New Zealand passenger rail services 1920 to 2020

As of 2026 there are long-distance passenger routes: the Northern Explorer between Auckland and Wellington, the TranzAlpine between Christchurch and Greymouth, the Southerner between Christchurch and Dunedin, Te Huia between Hamilton and Auckland, the Coastal Pacific between Picton and Christchurch, and the Capital Connection between Wellington and Palmerston North. The Mainlander was launched in 2026 by Mainland Rail, and operates between Christchurch and Invercargill.

Dunedin Railways Limited, trading as Dunedin Railway Station operates tourist trains out of Dunedin, with frequent services on the Taieri Gorge Railway (part of the former Otago Central Railway) line and occasional services north from Dunedin to Palmerston. This service was mothballed in the wake of the COVID-19 pandemic, but has since restarted with a reduced timetable.

Mixed trains were "once the backbone of the New Zealand railway passenger system" on branch and even main lines, but the last scheduled mixed train ran between Whangarei and Opua on 6 June 1977. With a "rake of assorted wagons" and one or two passenger carriages, often listed as "goods with car" in timetables, they were slow, often stopping and shunting wagons en route. In the 1930s they ran from Christchurch to Springfield on the Midland line, and into the 1950s overnight between Christchurch and Dunedin. On the North Island Main Trunk they ran during the day while the expresses ran at night. On the Okahukura-Stratford line they lasted to the early 1970s.

In the 1950s and 1960s, most provincial routes had railcar and locomotive-hauled passenger services. In 1965, there were 25 million passenger rail trips; by 1998 the number had decreased to 11.7 million. A number of services came to an end in the early 2000s, including the Waikato Connection between Hamilton and Auckland, the Kaimai Express between Auckland and Tauranga, the Geyserland Express between Auckland and Rotorua, the Bay Express between Wellington and Napier, the Southerner between Christchurch and Invercargill and the Northerner night service between Auckland and Wellington.

Two further long distance scheduled passenger services, the Northern Explorer and Coastal Pacific ended their services in December 2021. On 12 April 2022, KiwiRail announced the return of the Northern Explorer and Coastal Pacific services in September, alongside new multi day excursion trains at a later date.

Horizons Regional Council's 2021–2031 Regional Land Transport Plan noted that KiwiRail is considering a "connector service" which would link the districts' populations to urban services. It also noted that rail service between Whanganui and Palmerston North could be established. The Plan proposes to replace the Capital Connection, a long-range commuter train, with a modern and larger train fleet that could operate at a higher frequency.

=== Suburban passenger services ===
Auckland and Wellington have suburban passenger services. In both cities, the local governments own the suburban passenger rolling stock and contract the operation of services to a third party. The Auckland commuter rail services are operated by Auckland One Rail and the Wellington commuter rail services are operated by Transdev, with KiwiRail the rail network infrastructure provider.

==== Wellington ====
The Wellington suburban network has five lines: Johnsonville, Kapiti, Melling, Hutt Valley and Wairarapa. In 1938, Wellington became the second city (after the Christchurch service to Lyttelton) to have electric suburban trains, and from 1970 to 2014 was the only city with them.

From July 2016, the services have been operated by Transdev Wellington. Prior to Transdev, KiwiRail's Tranz Metro division held the contract. Wellington's suburban rolling stock consists of electric multiple units, with diesel locomotive-hauled carriage trains used on the Wairarapa service. All of the rolling stock (except the diesel locomotives) is owned by Greater Wellington Rail Limited, a subsidiary of Greater Wellington Regional Council. Transdev Wellington contracts KiwiRail to provide and operate the required diesel locomotives.

==== Auckland ====
Auckland's network consists of three lines: South City (S-C), East West (E-W) and Onehunga West (O-W). All services on these lines are provided by AM class electric trains, the conversion from diesel being completed by the end of 2015 with the exception of a then-non-electrified section of track between Papakura and Pukekohe, where a diesel train shuttle service operated. The Papakura to Pukekohe section was electrified in 2024 and reopened to the public in 2025. Auckland One Rail operates the electric trains on behalf of Auckland Transport (AT). In 2010 the mothballed Onehunga Branch was reopened and in April 2012 a newly built line, Manukau Branch, was opened on April 2012. Recent major projects include electrification of the Auckland suburban network and the building of the City Rail Link. Most Auckland rolling stock is owned by AT, which funds and coordinates all services.

==== Other cities ====
Other cities (Christchurch, Dunedin, Invercargill and Napier-Hastings) once had suburban services, but they were withdrawn due to a lack of patronage. The Christchurch-Lyttelton suburban service was stopped in 1972 when passengers were down to "a busload". The last "boat train" for the ferry service to Wellington ran in 1976. The 10.5 km line to Lyttelton was electrified from 1929 to 1970. There were worker's trains north to Rangiora; two in the morning and two in the afternoon. Dunedin had suburban trains to Port Chalmers and Mosgiel, withdrawn on 3 December 1982. The Invercargill to Bluff service stopped in 1967; in 1929 the sole Clayton steam railcar had been used. Trains ran the 12 miles (19 km) between Napier and Hastings but some were replaced by a New Zealand Railways Road Services bus in 1926, and soon they ceased altogether.

In 2017, the recently elected Labour-led Coalition government proposed to provide commuter rail in Christchurch and to provide long-distance commuter services from Auckland to Hamilton and Tauranga.

Worker's concession tickets had been introduced in 1897, initially for the Wellington-Hutt service, and extended next year to Auckland, Christchurch and Dunedin (and then between Westport and Waimangaroa). A 1979 NZR report "Time for Change" said that the Wellington suburban services revenue met only 26% of operating costs (Dunedin was 28%, Auckland 46%).

In 2025, Mainland Rail acquired a fleet of former Auckland Transport diesel multiple units, for use in Christchurch for special events to Te Kaha Stadium, with a planned launch for services in April 2026.

=== School commuters ===
Up to the 1930s and 1940s, pupils had to commute to larger towns for secondary education from places that only had a primary school; for example from rural Canterbury to Christchurch Technical High School. Another famous example was Sir Edmund Hillary who commuted by school train from Tuakau to Auckland Grammar School for three and a half hours, a one-hour and 40 minutes journey each way. School trains ran between Picton and Blenheim, allowing Picton students to attend Marlborough College (split into Marlborough Boys' College and Marlborough Girls' College in 1963). The service was cancelled when Queen Charlotte College opened in Picton in 1965, and those students remaining at the Marlborough Colleges switched to buses.

The NZR offered season tickets for primary and secondary school students from 1877, using funds paid for out of the Education budget, and from 1885 for students attending primary schools from a place lacking a local school. Premier Richard Seddon and the Liberal Government were keen to place secondary education "within the reach of the poorest man in the Colony" with an extension of the free passes in 1898 and 1909. School season passes increased from 8,720 in 1899 to 29,705 in 1914–15, when one in seven primary and secondary students travelled by train. Some pupils reached home after dark in the winter and had to milk cows before and after school. John Pascoe said that some children spend "up to six hours a day travelling." Boys and girls were usually segregated.

== Infrastructure and mechanical ==
=== Rail network ===
The New Zealand rail network has around 4,128 kilometres (2,565 miles) of line, of which about 506 kilometres (314 miles) is electrified. At the network's peak in 1953, some 5,689 kilometres (3,535 miles) of line was open. A 2009 study counted 1,787 bridges and 150 tunnels (totalling 80 kilometres (50 mi) in length) on the rail network, but a 2011 study said there were 1,636 bridges, with a total length of 63.8 km (39.6 mi) and 145 tunnels, with a total length of 87.4 km (54.3 mi). A 2021 KiwiRail report showed 106 tunnels and 1,344 bridges. Difficult terrain meant that some lines took years to complete, and has necessitated a number of complicated engineering feats, notably the Raurimu Spiral and Rimutaka Incline (the latter no longer in use).

The network has been the subject of major upgrading works on a number of occasions. The biggest of these were the Westfield Deviation of the North Island Main Trunk from Auckland to Westfield Junction via Panmure and Glen Innes, opened 1930, the Tawa Flat deviation in Wellington, opened 1937; the Rimutaka deviation to the Wairarapa, opened 1955; and the Kaimai deviation in the Bay of Plenty, opened 1978. All of these involved major tunnelling works, of close to 9 kilometres (5.6 miles) each in the two latter cases. Significant infrastructure improvements were also carried out on the North Island Main Trunk in the mid-1980s, some as part of the electrification scheme.

As part of the 10-year Turnaround Plan announced in 2010, a number of regional lines were placed under threat of closure: all lines in Northland that form part of the North Auckland Line, the Stratford–Okahukura line in Taranaki (mothballed since 2009), the northern portion of the Wairarapa Line, the Gisborne – Napier section of the Palmerston North - Gisborne Line (mothballed due to storm damage north of Wairoa early 2012, mothballed Napier – Gisborne from October 2012) As part of KiwiRail's 10-year long-term plan, most new capital will be spent on locomotives, wagons and the Auckland – Wellington – Christchurch freight corridor.

=== Signalling ===
Six signalling systems are used in New Zealand: automatic signalling rules (ASR), double line automatic (DLA), single line automatic (SLA), centralised traffic control (CTC), track warrant control (TWC), and station limits. Signals are of the colour light type and operate on speed signalling principles, i.e. signals tell the driver what speed they should proceed, but not necessarily the route they will take. The Auckland suburban network is also equipped with European Train Control System (ETCS) Level 1 signalling and train protection.

=== Motive power ===
==== Steam ====
From its inception until the 1950s, steam locomotives were the main motive power on New Zealand's railways. Initially, steam locomotives were mostly imported from the United Kingdom from various manufacturers. The first major class was the F class tank locomotives, of which 88 were imported. From the 1870s, locomotives were imported from the United States, and generally found to be better suited to New Zealand's conditions, although the pro-British public and politicians preferred locomotives from the United Kingdom. In 1889, NZR began manufacturing its own locomotives, starting with the NZR W class. Local engineering firm A&G Price also manufactured a significant number of steam locomotives for NZR.

==== Diesel ====
Dieselisation of rail transport began in the late 1940s with small shunting locomotives. The first mainline diesel locomotives, the English Electric D^{F} class, were introduced in 1954, but it was not until the introduction of the D^{A} class locomotives the following year that steam began to be seriously displaced in the North Island. The last steam locomotive to be built by NZR, J^{A} 1274, was introduced into service in December 1956, and by 1967, steam had all but disappeared from the North Island. Steam remained in the South Island until November 1971, when the last seven J^{A} locomotives that worked the Main South Line were withdrawn from revenue service, steam in the South Island having been displaced by the DJ class locomotive.

Starting from the mid-1970s, the first generation diesel locomotives were withdrawn, being replaced by new locomotives, predominantly designs from North America. The General Electric manufactured DX class were introduced from 1972 to 1975, and the original DF class were withdrawn and the General Motors DF class introduced from 1979. NZR also rebuilt some of the DG class locomotives. At the same time, the newest locomotives of the DA class were rebuilt as DC class locomotives in Australia and New Zealand. The last of the first-generation diesel locomotives were withdrawn in the late 1980s and early 1990s.

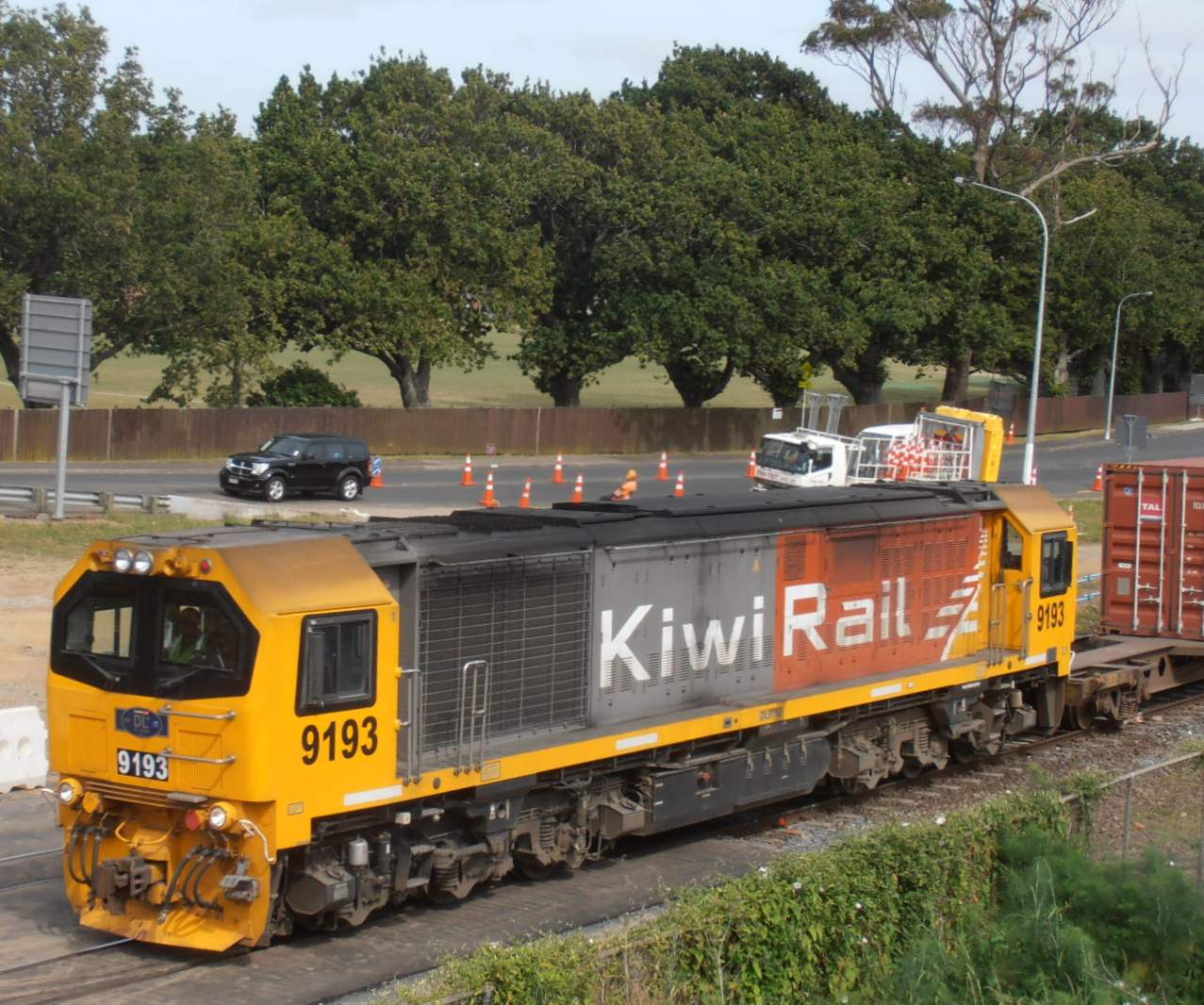
Chinese-built DL class locomotive 9193 hauling a freight train at Middlemore in November 2012

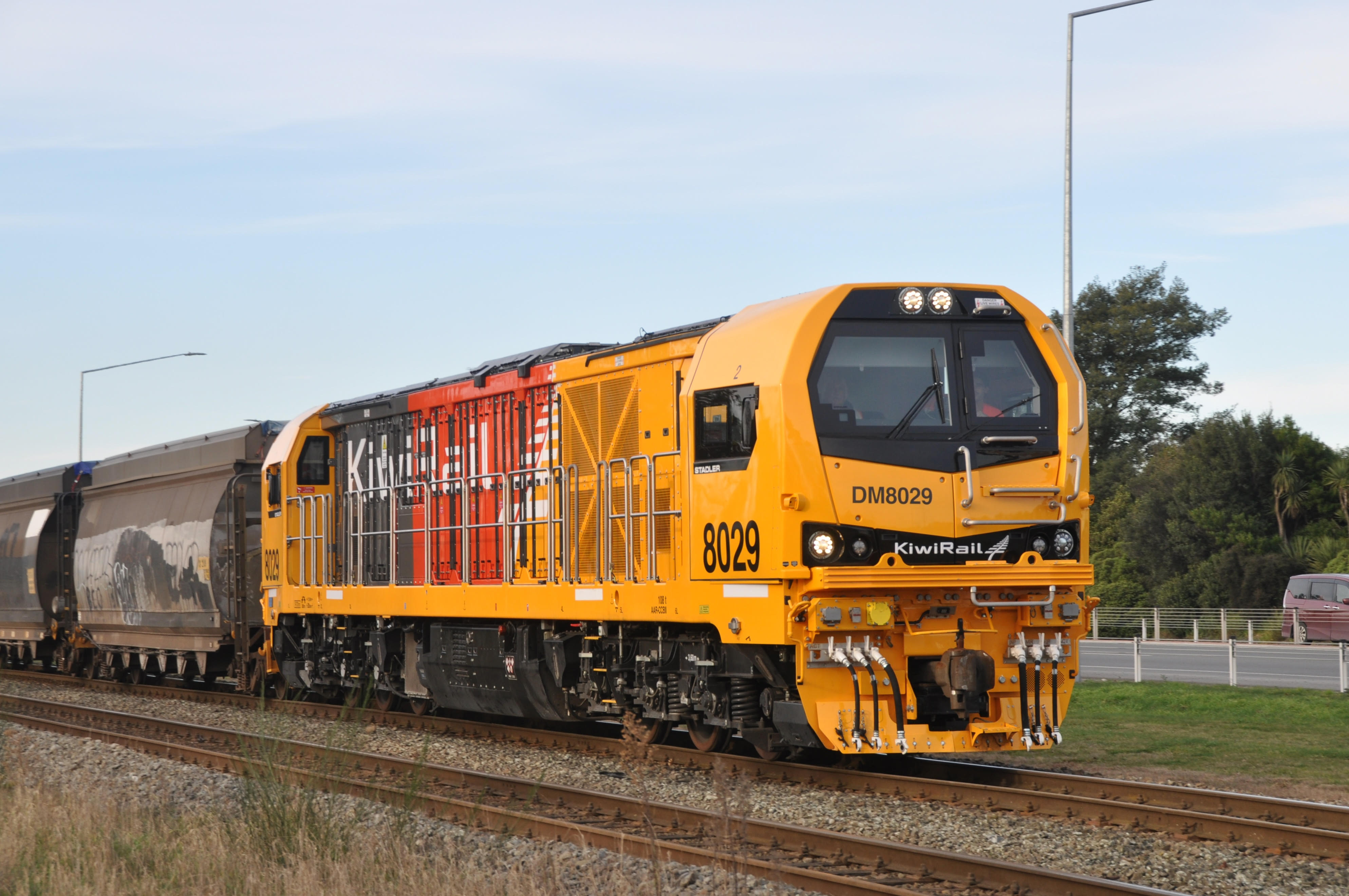
DM8029, one of the new Stadler Rail locomotives, introduced from 2025

Due to a decline in rail freight volumes following land transport deregulation in 1983, and the introduction of electrification on the North Island Main Trunk, no new mainline diesel locomotives were introduced in the 1990s. Some second-hand locomotives were imported from Queensland Rail in the mid-1990s and rebuilt as DQ class locomotives, most of these locomotives were then re-exported to Tasrail, then part-owned by Tranz Rail. The first new diesel locomotives imported to New Zealand since the 1970s were the DL class locomotives from China, arriving from 2010 onwards. In 2025, the first DM class locomotive entered service. The DM class will replace the DX class in the South Island.

==== Electric ====
In the 1920s, two short sections of railway line were electrified at 1500 V DC: Arthur's Pass to Otira (electrified 1923) and Christchurch to Lyttelton (1929), both which have since been decommissioned. Electrification of the Wellington suburban network at 1500 V DC began in 1938 with the Johnsonville Line, followed by the North Island Main Trunk (NIMT) as far as Paekakariki in 1940, and the Hutt Valley lines in 1953–55. The NIMT electrification was extended to Paraparaumu in 1983 and to Waikanae in 2011.

In 1988, 25 kV AC electrification of the North Island Main Trunk (NIMT) between Palmerston North and Hamilton was commissioned, and a new generation of mainline electric locomotives, the EF class, was introduced.

In 2014, electrification of Auckland's suburban rail network was completed, also built to 25 kV AC.

=== Couplings ===
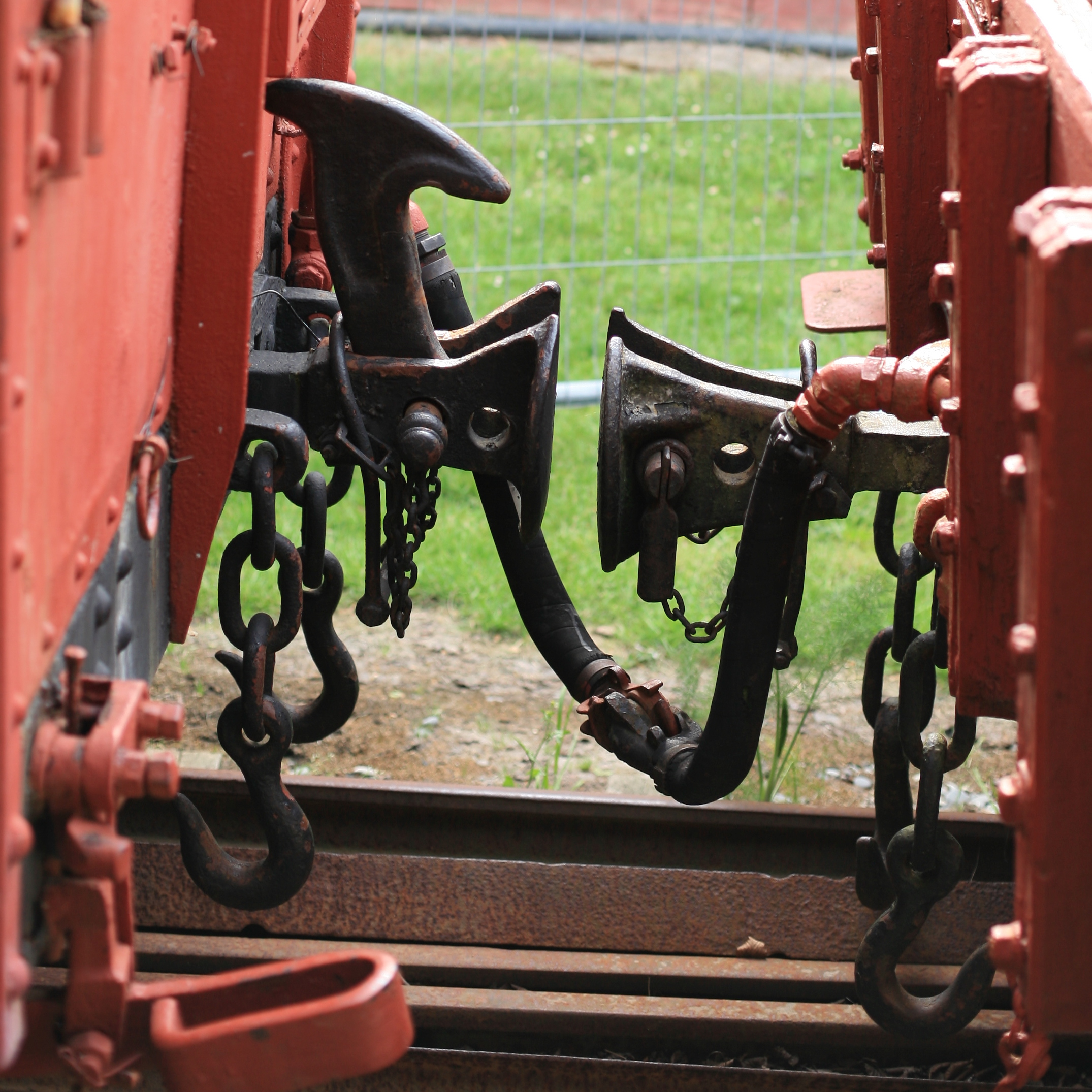
Norwegian couplings on old freight wagons displayed at the Little River railway station

The Norwegian coupling, also called chopper coupler, was the standard coupler used in New Zealand for non-passenger rolling stock and locomotives until the 2010s, when KiwiRail began a program to replace older couplers, which got underway in 2013. In the 1970s a large heavy-duty version of the chopper coupler was developed, initially for the DX class. Auckland's AM class and Wellington's FP/FT class "Matangi" electric multiple units use the Scharfenberg coupling.

The Janney ("Alliance") coupler was first used on heavy coal trains and has been progressively introduced on newer rolling stock and rebuilt locomotives.

=== Workshops ===
The New Zealand Railways Department had major workshops at Addington (Christchurch), Easttown (Whanganui), Hillside (Dunedin), Petone (Lower Hutt, near Wellington) then Hutt (Lower Hutt, near Wellington) and Newmarket then Otahuhu, (Auckland). All were progressively closed (mostly in the 1980s), leaving only Hutt Workshops still operating. A number of small maintenance depots also currently operate, for example at Addington, Christchurch.

In 2019 Hillside (Dunedin), which had been closed in 2012, was reopened.

== Accidents ==
Safety regulation is the responsibility of the NZ Transport Agency (NZTA). NZTA also investigates accidents and incidents with a view to ensuring regulations and rules were observed. The Transport Accident Investigation Commission may also inquire into selected accidents and incidents to determine the circumstances and causes and help prevent similar occurrences in the future.

Modern signalling, train detection and communications systems, as well as an overall decline in rail passenger traffic, has greatly decreased the number of fatal accidents occurring on New Zealand's railway network.

New Zealand's most serious rail disaster occurred on Christmas Eve 1953, during the visit of Queen Elizabeth II, when a lahar washed away the bridge in the Tangiwai disaster. 151 people died when the bridge collapsed as a Wellington-Auckland express passenger train was crossing it. The next most serious accident was the Hyde railway disaster of 1943, when the Cromwell–Dunedin express derailed after travelling at excessive speed. 21 people died. The driver was later found to have been intoxicated and was jailed for manslaughter.

== Heritage rail ==
=== Heritage mainline passenger services ===
Four heritage rail operators own and operate their own carriage and mainline-certified steam or diesel locomotive fleets. These are the Railway Enthusiasts Society, Steam Incorporated, Mainline Steam Trust and the Otago Excursion Train Trust (Dunedin Railways). These groups have operated special excursion trains on the national network since 1978, and have been allowed to use suitable locomotives to haul these trains since 1985.

=== Heritage and museum railways ===
About 60 groups operate railway heritage lines or museums, almost all members of the Federation of Rail Organisations of New Zealand. They include street tramways and bush tramways as well as railways. Large-scale rail preservation in New Zealand got underway in the 1960s when many steam locomotives were withdrawn and branch lines closed.

Current operations of the heritage railway type include the Kingston Flyer, Glenbrook Vintage Railway, Bush Tramway Club, Waitara Railway Preservation Society, Weka Pass Railway, and Dunedin Railways. Dunedin Railways is a Council-controlled organisation (CCO) 72% owned by the Dunedin City Council and runs the Taieri Gorge Limited which is 60 kilometres (37 mi) in length, and various other services around Dunedin and Otago.

All other lines are operated by voluntary societies. The Weka Pass Railway at 13 kilometres (8.1 mi) is the most lengthy of these. The Bay of Islands Vintage Railway is 11 kilometres (6.8 mi) in length, but is in poor condition; having operated its first trains through Kawakawa since operations ceased in 2000 for two weeks from 3 July 2007, the Society is now working on rehabilitating the track between Kawakawa and Opua.

== In popular culture ==
New Zealand National Film Unit Film Director David Sims completed a number of films on the history of New Zealand railways, including Main Trunk Century (2009); The Truth About Tangiwai (2002); Total Steam (1996); North Island Main Trunk (1995).

In 2004–05 Television New Zealand (through Jam Productions) broadcast Off the Rails: A Love Story, a 12-part journey on the then current rail network from Invercargill to Northland, presented by Marcus Lush.

== See also ==
- List of New Zealand railway museums and heritage lines
- List of railway lines in New Zealand
- Public transport in New Zealand
- Trams in New Zealand
- Transport in New Zealand
- Tunnels in New Zealand

== Bibliography ==
- Atkinson, Neil (2007). Trainland: How Railways made New Zealand. Auckland: Random House. ISBN 978-1-86941-905-9.
- Barry, Colin; Brouwer, John; Dash, Colin; Dickenson, Peter; Shalders, Bruce (1988). Cavalcade 125. Ferrymead 125 Committee.
- Brett, André (June 2016). Acknowledge No Frontier – The Creation and Demise of New Zealand's Provinces, 1853–76. Dunedin: Otago University Press. ISBN 978-1-927322-36-9.
- Brett, André; van der Weerden, Sam (2021). Can't Get There From Here - New Zealand Passenger Rail Since 1920. Otago University Press. ISBN 9781990048098.
- Bromby, Robin (2003). Rails that built a Nation: An Encyclopaedia of New Zealand Railways. Wellington: Grantham House. ISBN 1-86934-080-9.
- Churchman, Geoffrey B; Hurst, Tony (2001) [1990, 1991]. The Railways of New Zealand: A Journey through History (Second ed.). Transpress New Zealand. ISBN 0-908876-20-3.
- Churchman, Geoffrey B. (1992). Danger Ahead – New Zealand Railway Accidents in the Modern Era. Sydney and Wellington: IPL Publishing Group. ISBN 0-908876-74-2.
- Stott, Bob; Leitch, David (1988). New Zealand Railways: The First 125 Years. Auckland: Heinemann Reed. p. 176. ISBN 0-7900-0000-8.
- Millar, Sean (2011). The NZR Steam Locomotive. Wellington: New Zealand Railway and Locomotive Society. ISBN 978-0-908573-89-9.
- KiwiRail Locomotive and Rolling Stock Register - 2011. Mosgiel, New Zealand: Triple M Productions. 2011. ISBN 978-0-9582072-2-5.
- Johnston, Alexa (2013). Sir Edmund Hillary: An Extraordinary Life. Penguin Random House New Zealand Limited. ISBN 978-0143006466.
- Parsons, David (2002). New Zealand Railway Motive Power 2002. New Zealand Railway and Locomotive Society. p. 64. ISBN 978-0-908573-78-3.
- Palmer, A. N.; Stewart, W. W. (1965). Cavalcade of New Zealand Locomotives. Wellington: A H. & A W. Reed. ISBN 978-0-207-94500-7.
- Sinclair, Roy (1987). Rail: The Great New Zealand Adventure. Wellington: Grantham House. ISBN 1-86934-013-2.
- Troup, Gordon, ed. (1973). Steel Roads of New Zealand: An Illustrated Survey. A.H. & A.W. Reed. ISBN 0-589-00735-1.
- Stewart, W. W. (1974). When Steam was King. Wellington: A. H. & A. W. Reed Ltd. ISBN 978-0-589-00382-1.
- Wright, Matthew (2003). Rails across New Zealand: A History of Rail Travel. Wellington: Whitcoulls. ISBN 1-87732-714-X.
- Wright, Matthew (2009). Journey to the Pass: Memories of the Midland Line. Templeton, Christchurch: Hilton Press. ISBN 978-0-473-14641-2.
