= NZR L class =

Class of New Zealand steam locomotives

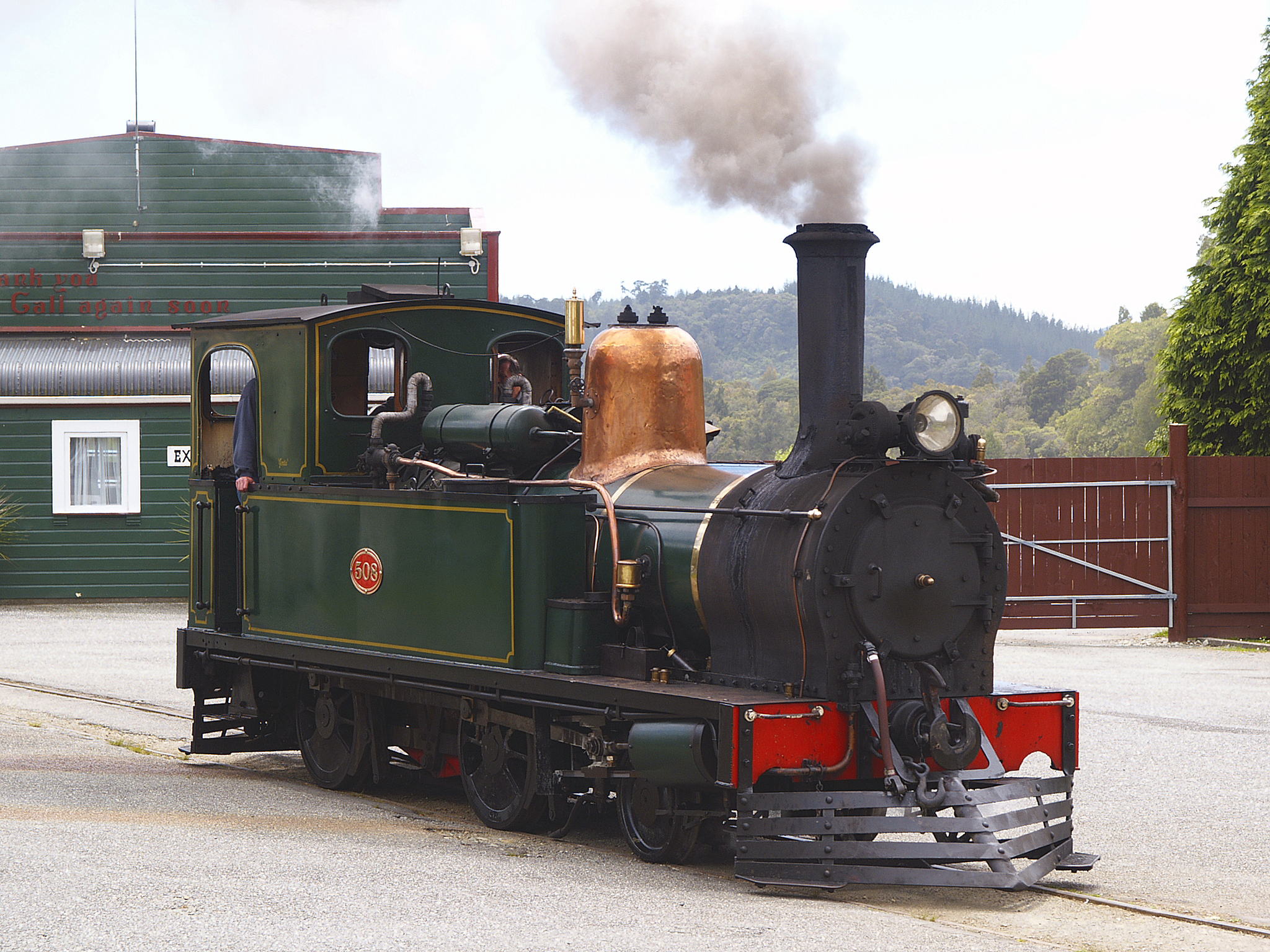
- NZR L 508 in Shantytown Heritage Park in 2004.
Type and origin
- Builder: Avonside
- Build date: 1877
- Total produced: 10
Specifications
- Configuration
  - Whyte: 2-4-0T
- Gauge: 3 ft 6 in (1,067 mm)
- Driver dia.: 36 in (0.914 m)
- Length: 24 ft 1/2 in (7.328 m)
- Adhesive weight: 13.2 long tons (13.4 tonnes; 14.8 short tons)
- Loco weight: 18.5 long tons (18.8 tonnes; 20.7 short tons)
- Fuel type: Coal
- Firebox
  - Grate area: 9.2 sq ft (0.85 m^{2})
- Boiler pressure: 130 lbf/in^{2} (896 kPa)
- Heating surface: 486 sq ft (45.2 m^{2})
- Cylinders: Two, outside
- Cylinder size: 10.5 in × 18 in (267 mm × 457 mm)
Performance figures
- Tractive effort: 4,893 lbf (21.77 kN)
Career
- Operators: NZR

The NZR L class were a series of ten small tank engines built in England for the New Zealand Railways Department (NZR) during the early years of the development of New Zealand's railway network.

== Origin and design ==
The L class were designed to provide improved performance over the successful F class on faster passenger services and were built by the Avonside Engine Co. All entered service in 1878 and were used on important passenger trains on the Auckland and Wellington Sections. Although the G class, designed with a similar purpose in mind suffered from poor adhesion, the L was more successful in terms of performance. They were used intensively and provided solid service, although they were not used on passenger services for long due to their small size.

== Modifications ==
NZR began an intensive programme of rebuilding older tank locomotives to attempt to extract improved performance. Parts from seven locomotives were used in this programme, being initially fitted with a leading bogie turning them into L^{A} Class 4-4-0Ts then later with larger coal bunkers to 4-4-2Ts. The remaining three unmodified locomotives were sold to the Public Works Department (PWD) in the early 1900s.

== Sales and disposals ==
While all of the rebuilt L class had been officially withdrawn by 1939, the three unmodified locomotives sold to the PWD went on to have much longer careers. No. 507 (formerly 207 in NZR service) was sold to the Taranaki Harbour Board in 1931, and numbers 508 and 509 (formerly 208 and 219) were sold to Wilson's Portland Cement, an industrial plant south of Whangārei. All three ended up working at Portland until the 1970s, when they were around 95 years old. They were then all donated for preservation where all three remain operational.

== Preserved locomotives ==
Three L Class locomotives have been preserved:

- L 207 - Museum of Transport and Technology Operational, took part in North Island Main Trunk centennial celebrations in 2008
- L 208 - ShantyTown Operational, named Gertie
- L 219 - Silver Stream Railway Operational, took part in North Island Main Trunk centennial celebrations in 2008

== See also ==
- NZR F class
- NZR F^{A} / F^{B}
- NZR G class (1874)
- NZR L^{A} class
- Locomotives of New Zealand
