= NZR F Class F13 Peveril =

1872 0-6-0ST New Zealand steam locomotive

NZR F13 Peveril
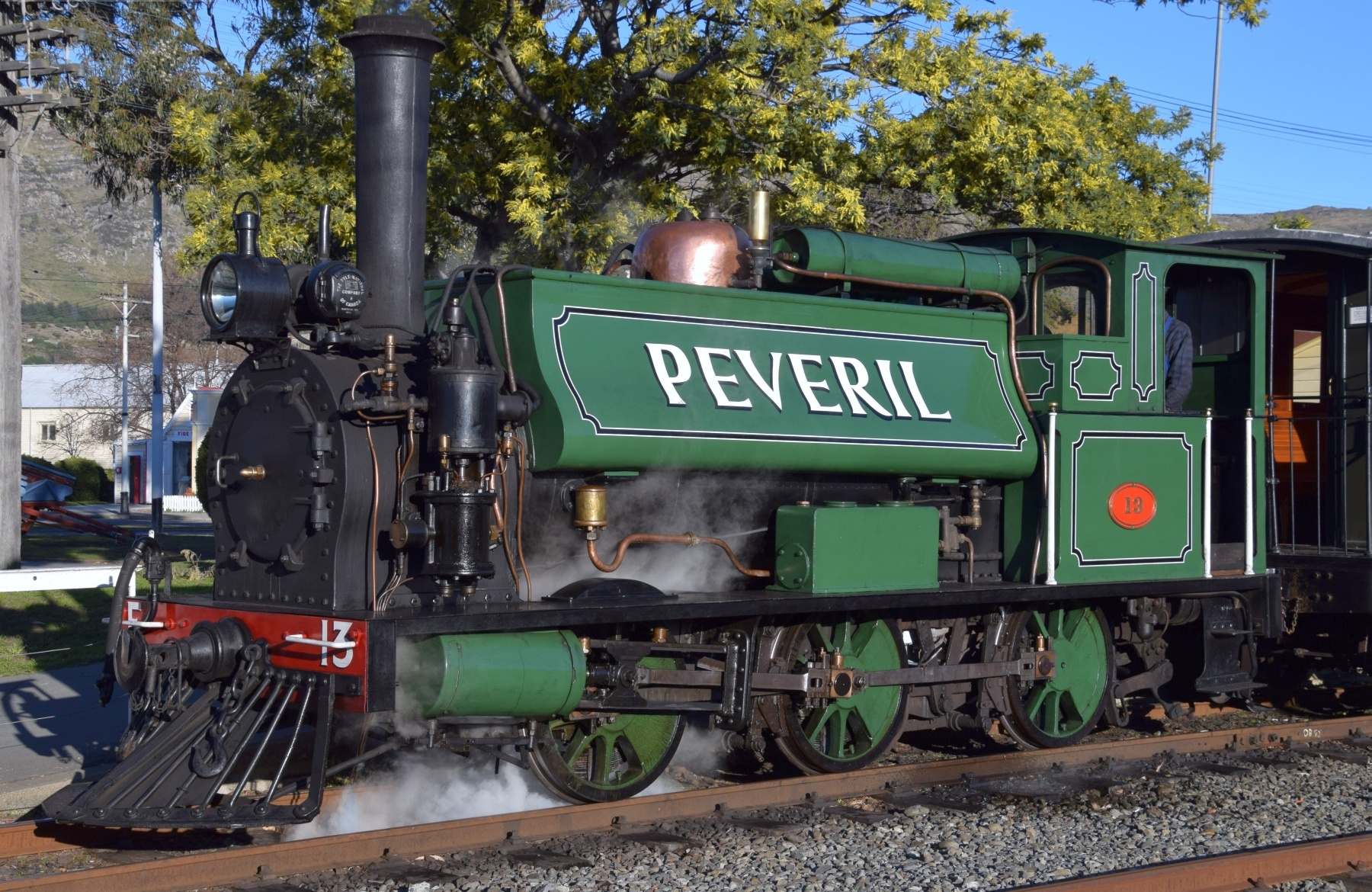
- F13 Peveril at the Ferrymead Railway
Type and origin
- Power type: Steam
- Builder: Neilson & Co
- Build date: 1872
Specifications
- Configuration
  - Whyte: 0-6-0
- Driver dia.: 36 in (914 mm)
- Wheelbase: 10 ft 6 in (3,200 mm)
- Loco weight: 19.2 long tons (21.5 short tons; 19.5 tonnes)
- Fuel type: Coal
- Fuel capacity: 0.95 long tons (1.06 short tons; 0.97 tonnes)
- Water cap.: 350 imp gal (1,600 L; 420 US gal)
- Boiler pressure: 130 psi (0.90 MPa)
- Cylinders: Two, Outside
- Cylinder size: 10.5 in × 18 in (267 mm × 457 mm)
Performance figures
- Tractive effort: 5,733 lbf (25.50 kN)
Career
- Operators: Ferrymead Railway
- Restored: 1984, 2014
- Disposition: Preserved

NZR class F 13 Peveril is a preserved New Zealand Railways F class 0-6-0ST steam locomotive and is the oldest running locomotive in New Zealand and one of the oldest surviving locomotives in New Zealand along with NZR E Class Josephine.

== History and service ==
Peveril was built in 1872 along with four other locomotives in the first batch of locomotives that would become the F class with F13 being one of three prototypes built. Along with the NZR E class they were the first locomotives for the NZR. Originally called Clutha before being renamed Edie Ochiltree it entered service in 1872 as No. 8 of the Otago Railway, it was renumbered F36 in 1877 before receiving its current number F13 and losing its name in 1885. It was then based at Christchurch with sibling locomotive F163 where it saw shunting duty service and in 1958 it was named Peveril and participated in the NZR's centenary celebrations in 1963 before being withdrawn in 1965. It was later donated to Ferrymead in 1967 where it was stored before being put on display in 1973.

It was restored to working order between 1982 and 1984 and was used for passenger services on the railway. Apart from a few cases between 1987 and 1990 and a brief period in 1999, the locomotive has remained at Ferrymead and the Christchurch-Lyttleton area. It was withdrawn from service in the 1990s and remained in storage before being restored to working order again in 2014.
