= NZR FA class =

New Zealand F^{A} class
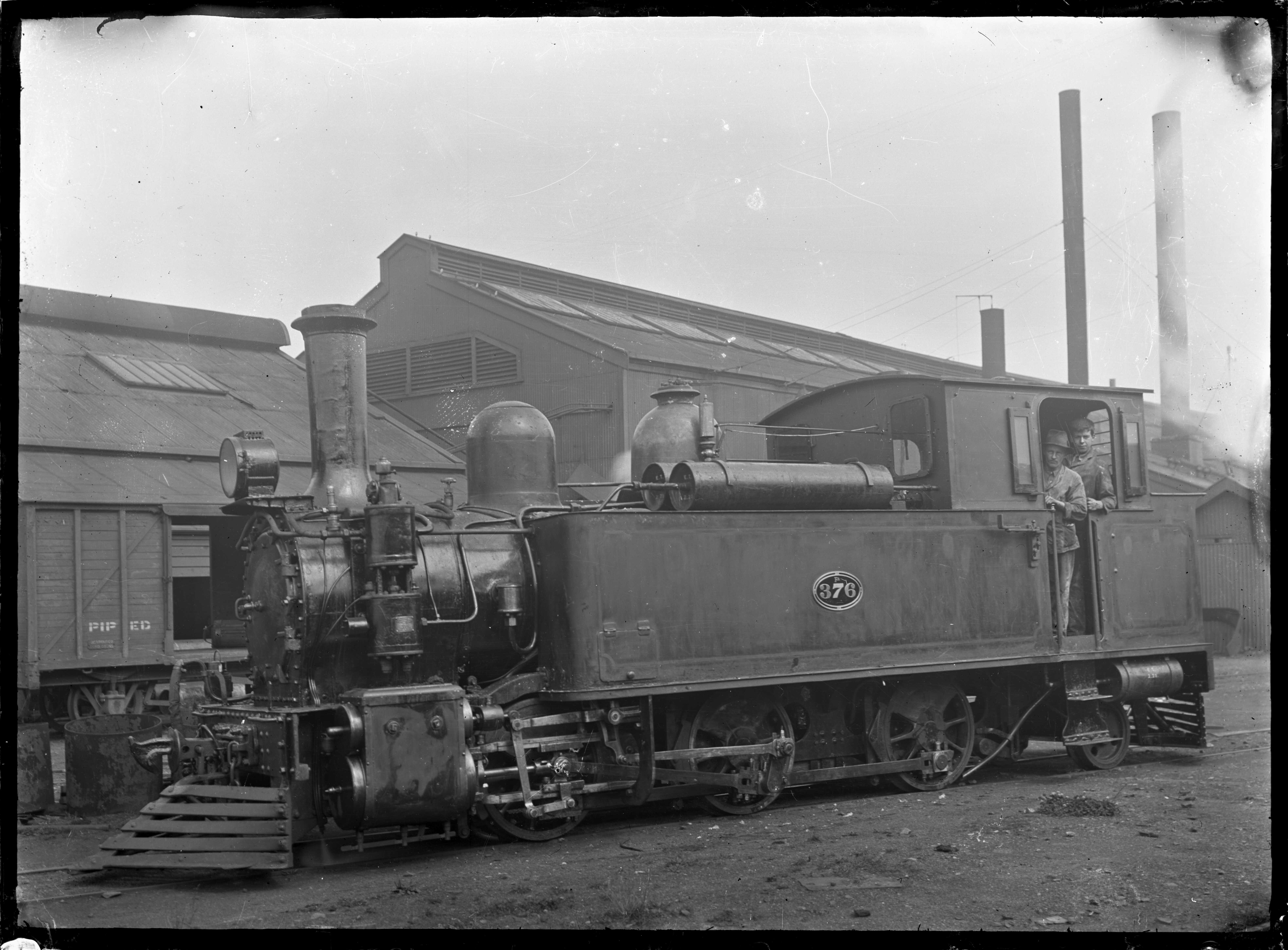
- F^{A} class 0-6-2T steam locomotive, NZR number 376
Type and origin
- Power type: Steam
- Builder: New Zealand Government Railways
- Total produced: 20
Specifications
- Configuration
  - Whyte: 0-6-2T
- Gauge: 3 ft 6 in (1,067 mm)
- Driver dia.: 36 in (0.914 m)
- Wheelbase: 10 ft 6 in (3.20 m)
- Length: 26 ft 6 in (8.08 m)
- Adhesive weight: 25.5 long tons (25.9 t; 28.6 short tons)
- Loco weight: 29.7 long tons (30.2 t; 33.3 short tons)
- Fuel capacity: 1.6 long tons (1.6 t; 1.8 short tons)
- Water cap.: 450 imp gal (2,000 L; 540 US gal)
- Firebox
  - Grate area: 10.7 sq ft (0.99 m^{2})
- Boiler pressure: 160 psi (1.10 MPa)
- Heating surface: 530 sq ft (49 m^{2})
- Cylinders: Two, outside
- Cylinder size: 12 in × 18 in (305 mm × 457 mm)
Performance figures
- Tractive effort: 9,090 lbf (40.43 kN)
Career
- Disposition: 3 preserved, 1 in service, 16 scrapped

The NZR F^{A} class was a class of tank steam locomotives that was built as a larger version of the NZR F class 0-6-0T. The requirements were for larger water and coal capacity on a locomotive that could handle grades better than the F class. Due to costs involved in producing new machines, NZR chose to rebuild existing machines with larger coal and water capacity, larger boiler and firebox, higher boiler pressure and larger diameter pistons. Seven F class engines were rebuilt between 1892 and 1897. Another seven were built new, one at Newmarket Workshops in 1896 and six at Addington Workshops in 1902–03.

== Improvements ==
Due to longer distances being travelled, it became clear that the standard F class were unable to cope due to their limited coal and water capacity. The first twelve locomotives rebuilt to class F^{A} between 1892 and 1895 were designed to overcome this problem. The locomotives were re-equipped with Walschaerts valve motion, new side tanks and cabs, and a larger boiler. Nominally, the extent of the changes meant that very little of these locomotives actually remained from the original.

Although they were now more powerful than the F class and were reasonably successful, the F^{A} class was hampered like the L^{A} 4-4-0T rebuilds in that their coal bunkers were too small. The decision was made in 1897 to extend the frames of F 9, then undergoing conversion at Addington Workshops, and fit an extended coal bunker. To accommodate this, a two-wheeled trailing truck would be added.

Initially, F^{A} 9 was classified as an F^{B} class locomotive to differentiate it from the 0-6-0T conversions. Once its success had been confirmed, all of the F^{A} class locomotives were rebuilt to the F^{B} class specifications between 1900 and 1905. Following the completion of the final conversion in 1905, all locomotives were reclassified as the F^{A} class once more.

Plans had existed in 1901 to rebuild further F class locomotives, but these were scrapped and in 1902-03 a further six F^{B} class locomotives were built, numbers 315 and 372–376. These locomotives differed from the other rebuilds in having a redesigned frame and piston valves in place of the original slide valves fitted to the earlier rebuilds. F^{A} 9 also differed from the standard rebuilds in that its trailing truck had outside journal boxes instead of the internal type used on the other engines.

== Withdrawal ==
The F^{A} class saw little work after 1919 due to increases in traffic and in part to their complexity over the standard F class. The locomotives were progressively withdrawn up until 1943, when the last locomotive of this type, F^{A} 250 (based at Westport) was sold to the Whakatane Board Mills for use on their Matahina Tramway in the Bay of Plenty. Most were scrapped and their boilers fitted to F class locomotives.

During their working lives, the F^{A} class locomotives were reboilered at least once, with the original boilers being fitted to members of the F, G, and L class locomotives among others. As a result, most preserved F and L class locomotives have a F or F^{A} class boiler in place of the original type of boiler. While this provides a degree of standardisation, it is somewhat negated by the fact that these boilers come from different makers and have differences in internal fittings such as the dry-pipe.

Two engines that were not scrapped following withdrawal were F^{A} 315 and 373, which had been allocated to the Nelson Section following their rebuilding. They had been put aside in the Glenhope engine shed following withdrawal and were dumped in the Glenhope ballast pit in the mid-1930s. These locomotives were at the time relatively complete, but in time their wheels, boilers, and water tanks were removed. (Note: The remains of F^{A} 315 and 373 were used as a source of new boilers for the NZ Army Papakura Camp in 1944; the water tanks were used as abutments on the Pretty Creek Bridge once filled with rocks, and the wheels were taken by farmers to attach to their tractors as weights.) The remains of the locomotives, if they still exist, comprise the frames, cowcatchers, cylinders, upper cab and coal bunkers.

== Industrial Use ==
Like the NZR F class, members of the F^{A} class also saw service after being retired from NZR service. The largest user of these engines was the Ohai Railway Board, who owned engines F^{A} 10, 157, and 251 between 1919 and 1954. The last in service, F^{A} 251, was displaced permanently in 1947 by the arrival of the railway's second Drewry 0-6-0DM diesel locomotive. It was not scrapped immediately but may have lingered at Wairio for some time before it was finally scrapped.

F^{A} 41 and F^{A} 250 were purchased by the Whakatane Board Mills for use on their Matahina Tramway in 1937 and 1943 respectively. These two engines were later displaced by two Drewry 0-6-0DM diesel locomotives, and F^{A} 41 was onsold to Auckland Farmers Freezing Company (AFFCo) in 1960. F^{A} 250 lasted until 1967 when it was donated to the NZR&LS Waikato Branch for display at the now-defunct Te Awamutu Railway Museum and is now stored at the Bay of Islands Vintage Railway, waiting to be restored.

AFFCo purchased F^{A} 9 in 1943, and purchased F^{A} 41 from the Whakatane Board Mills in 1960. Both were converted to 0-6-0DM diesel shunters in 1953 and 1964 respectively and worked at AFFCo Moerewa and Horotiu respectively. When the former F^{A} 41 was withdrawn in 1980, its frame was donated to the Bush Tramway Club at Pukemiro Junction for spare parts.

== See also ==
- NZR F class
- NZR G class (1874)
- NZR L class
- NZR L^{A} class
- Locomotives of New Zealand
