= New Zealand Midland Railway Company =

Railway company in New Zealand

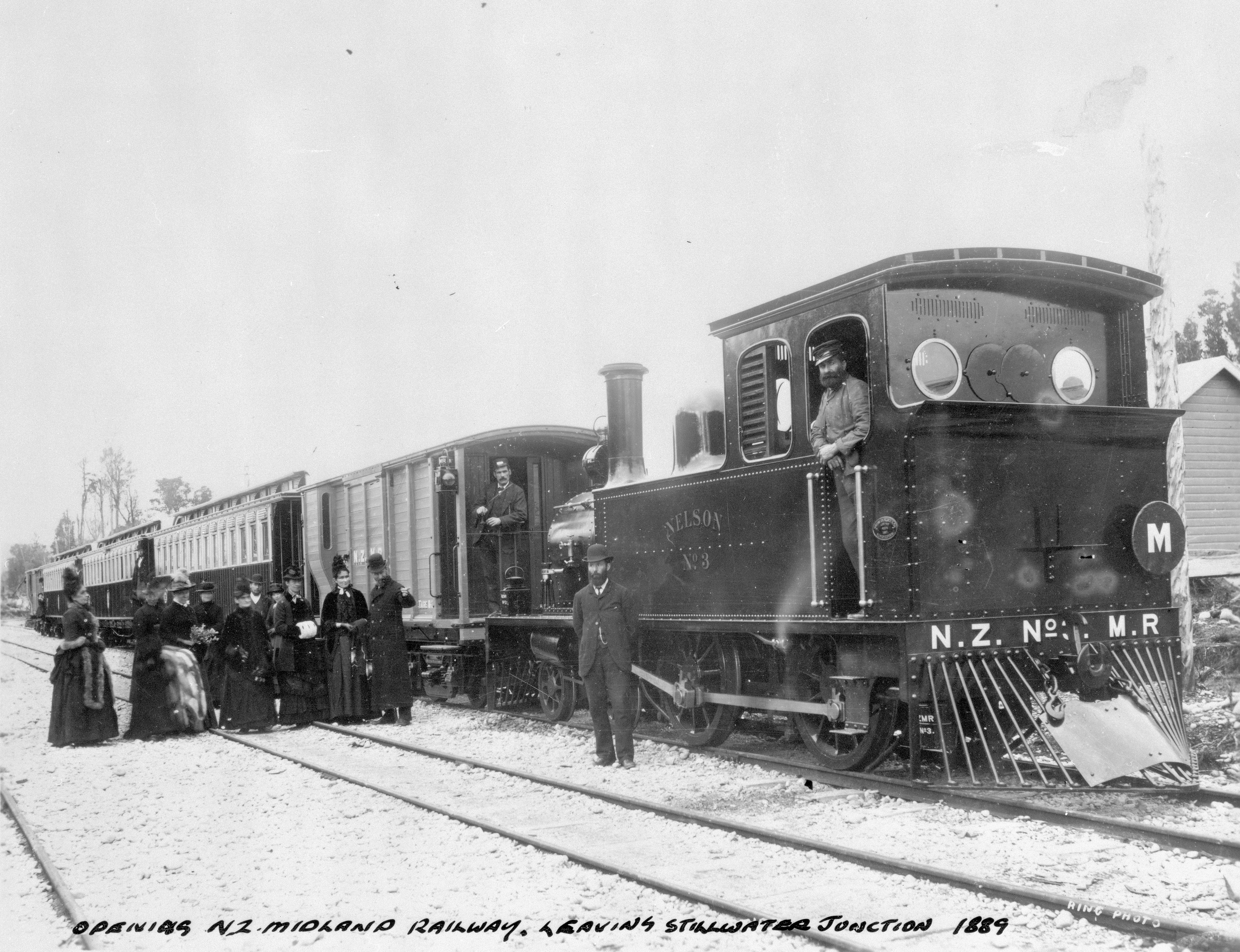
- Opening of the Midland line to Stillwater junction, 1889. NZMRC No. 3 is pictured.

Overview
- Headquarters: London
- Reporting mark: NZMRC
- Locale: Canterbury, Nelson and West Coast of the South Island, New Zealand.
- Dates of operation: 1885–1894
- Successor: New Zealand Railways Department

Technical
- Track gauge: 3 ft 6 in (1,067 mm)
- Length: 376 km (234 mi) (incomplete)

The New Zealand Midland Railway Company partially constructed the Midland line between Christchurch and Greymouth and the Nelson railway in the South Island. It was one of the few private railway companies in New Zealand, and it did not match the success of the Wellington and Manawatu Railway Company.

== History ==
In the 1880s, New Zealand's economy was in the grips of the Long depression and the New Zealand Government (with considerable investment in Vogel railways) was in no position to make further investment in railways. The East and West Coast and Nelson Railway Act was passed to enable the railway to be built and operated by private enterprise and a deputation of Sir Arthur Dudley Dobson, Alan Scott and C.Y. Fell visited London to interest financiers in promoting a company. The Wellington and Manawatu Railway Company was also established in the 1880s (1881) to build the West Coast line north of Wellington.

In July 1885 the deputation accepted an offer from a committee that became the New Zealand Midland Railway Company. The company contracted with the Government in 1886 to build 235 miles (376 km) of railway between Christchurch and Nelson via Brunnerton (later Brunner) within ten years. The fee for this was £2.5m. The company was to get 10 shillings of land for every 20 shillings spent on construction.

With insufficient capital and a London management remote from the realities of railway construction in New Zealand it had little chance of success. The company commenced construction from Brunner and on the Nelson Section heading up the Grey Valley towards Reefton, the line to Nelson diverged at Stillwater from the Greymouth to Christchurch line. It was not until 1890 that work commenced at the Canterbury end, the contract for the 5.5 miles from Springfield to Pattersons Creek being let to J. & A. Anderson Ltd of Christchurch. The work was to include steel viaducts over the Kowai River and Pattersons Creek.

The company ran out of money and construction ceased on the West Coast in late 1894. On the Springfield section only the Kowai bridges and 4.5 miles to track to Otarama were usable as a railway. The foundations for Pattersons Creek viaduct were in place but the steel superstructure still had to be manufactured and erected.

So in May 1895 the Government seized the company's assets and completed works under the Railways Construction and Land Act 1881, on the grounds that the contract had expired with the works incomplete. Legal argument and court actions between the parties ensued and was not finally resolved by the Privy Council in England until May 1903. In 1898 the Public Works Department took over and resumed work. The government took over 131 km of track plus 21 stations, 80 bridges, 3 tunnels, 6 locomotives and rolling stock (seven passenger cars and three brake vans). A token payment of £150,000 was made to the company. The railway was worked by NZR from 25 May 1895 and ownership was vested in the Government from 23 July 1900.

== Motive power ==
The company operated mainly 4-4-0 tank locomotives. When it was acquired by the New Zealand Railways Department the first five locomotives, built by Nasmyth Wilson in 1887, were classed L^{A} class. The last locomotive was a D class.

== See also ==
- Nelson Section
- Rail transport in New Zealand
