= NZR LA class =

Class of New Zealand steam locomotives

NZR L^{A} Class
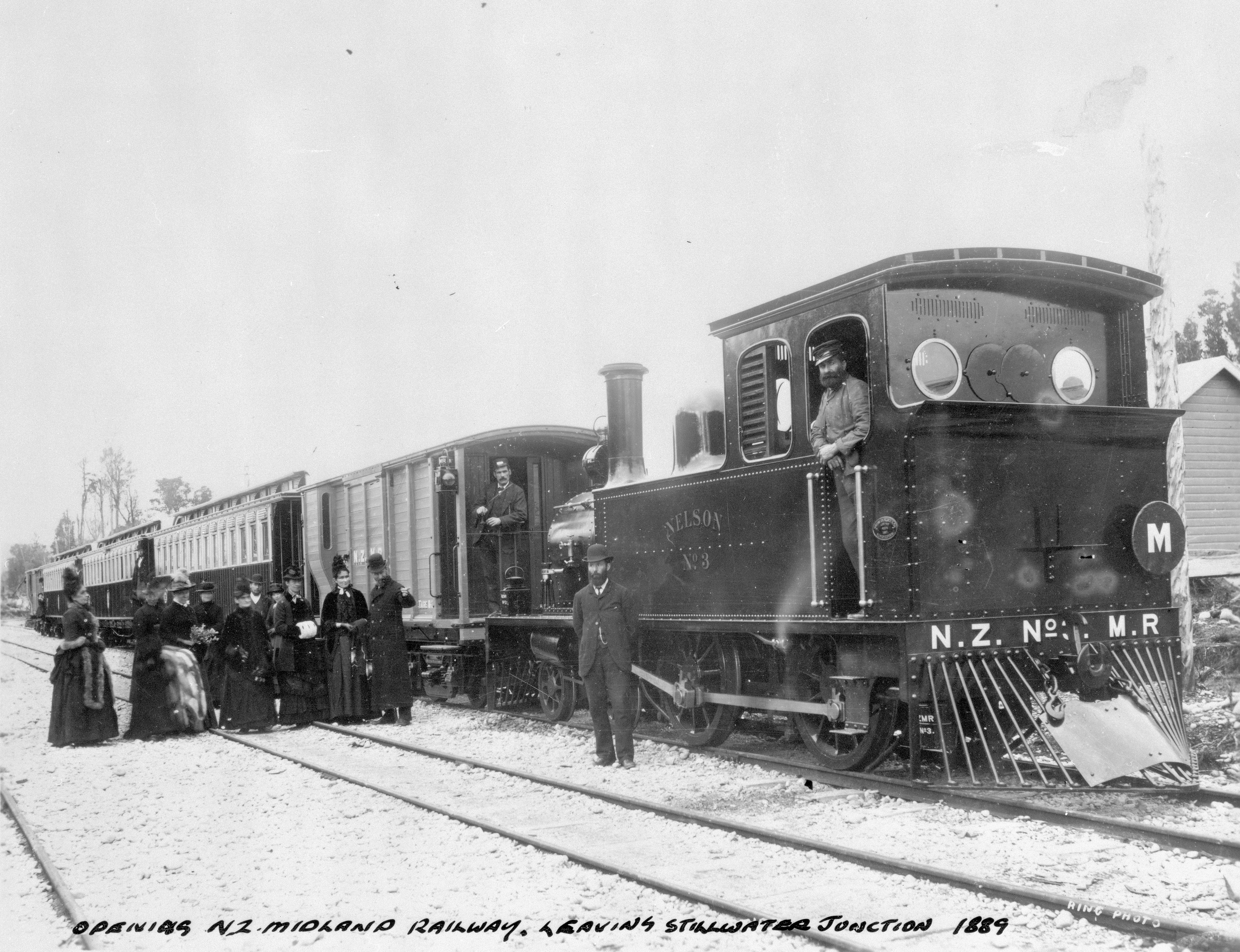
- New Zealand Midland Railway Co. N^{O} 3 (NZR L^{A} 312) at Stillwater Junction during the opening of the Midland Railway between Greymouth and Stillwater, 1889.
Type and origin
- Power type: Steam
- Builder: Nasmyth, Wilson & Co.
- Serial number: 311–312, 315, 322–323
- Build date: 1887
- Total produced: 5
Specifications
- Configuration
  - Whyte: 4-4-0T; later 4-4-2T
- Gauge: 3 ft 6 in (1,067 mm)
- Driver dia.: 45 in (1.143 m)
- Length: 26 ft 2 in (7.98 m)
- Adhesive weight: 19.2 long tons (19.5 tonnes; 21.5 short tons)
- Loco weight: 26.6 long tons (27.0 t; 29.8 short tons)
- Firebox
  - Grate area: 9.8 sq ft (0.91 m^{2})
- Boiler pressure: 140 lbf/in^{2} (965 kPa)
- Heating surface: 506 sq ft (47.0 m^{2})
- Cylinders: Two, outside
- Cylinder size: 12 in × 18 in (305 mm × 457 mm)
Performance figures
- Tractive effort: 6,450 lbf (28.7 kN)
Career
- Numbers: NZMRC 1–5; NZR 310–314
- Retired: 1924–1926

The NZR L^{A} class was a class of 4-4-0T steam locomotives used by the New Zealand Railways Department and the New Zealand Midland Railway Company. They were built by Nasmyth, Wilson and Company in 1887 for New Zealand Midland Railway Company, and were taken over by NZR in 1900, when the government acquired the incomplete Midland line. The designation also applies to the NZR 4-4-0Trebuilds of the Avonside L class of 1875 which were later reclassified L^{B} after being rebuilt as 4-4-2Ts.

== Midland L^{A} class ==
The New Zealand Midland Railway Company ordered five 4-4-0T locomotives from Nasmyth Wilson in 1887 for use on their planned railway between Nelson, Greymouth and Christchurch. These locomotives were built to a standard Nasmyth Wilson design for export, and had double-skinned cab roofs for work in tropical climates. The first three locomotives were named Reefton, Christchurch and Nelson on entry into service; the other two locomotives never carried names.

The locomotives, numbered as NZMRC N^{O}'s 1–5, were responsible for running all trains over the Midland Railway between Reefton, Stillwater and Lake Brunner, as well as running NZMRC trains over the NZR line between Stillwater and Greymouth. Following the failure of the NZMRC and its takeover by the NZR, the locomotives were renumbered as L^{A} 310–315. Now based at Greymouth, the engines remained in service until the first withdrawal began in 1920.

== Withdrawal ==
The first Midland L^{A} to be withdrawn was L^{A} 311 (formerly NZMRC N^{O} 2) in March 1920. The remaining locomotives were withdrawn between 1924 and 1928. Two of the withdrawn locomotives were sold for industrial service; L^{A} 311 was sold to the Auckland Farmers Freezing Company in 1920 and worked as a shunting locomotive at their Moerewa works between 1920 and 1934, while L^{A} 314 was sold to the New Forest Sawmilling Company at Ngahere where it worked as the mill's yard engine transferring wagons between the NZR station and the sawmill between 1926 and 1950.

The remaining locomotives, L^{A}'s 310, 312 and 313, were written off but not scrapped. Instead, at least one, L^{A} 312, was dumped at the Omoto locomotive dump in 1929. The remains of L^{A} 312 were salvaged for preservation in 2006 and are now in storage pending restoration to working order.

== Rebuilds ==
In 1893–94, NZR decided to rebuild three Avonside L class 2-4-0T locomotives as 4-4-0T locomotives. The conversion, classified by the NZR as the L^{A} class, did not address the limited fuel capacity, and all further rebuilds were rebuilt as 4-4-2Ts.

== See also ==
- NZR F class
- NZR F^{A} / F^{B}
- NZR G class (1874)
- NZR L class
- Locomotives of New Zealand
