= NZR G class (1874) =

NZR G Class (1874)
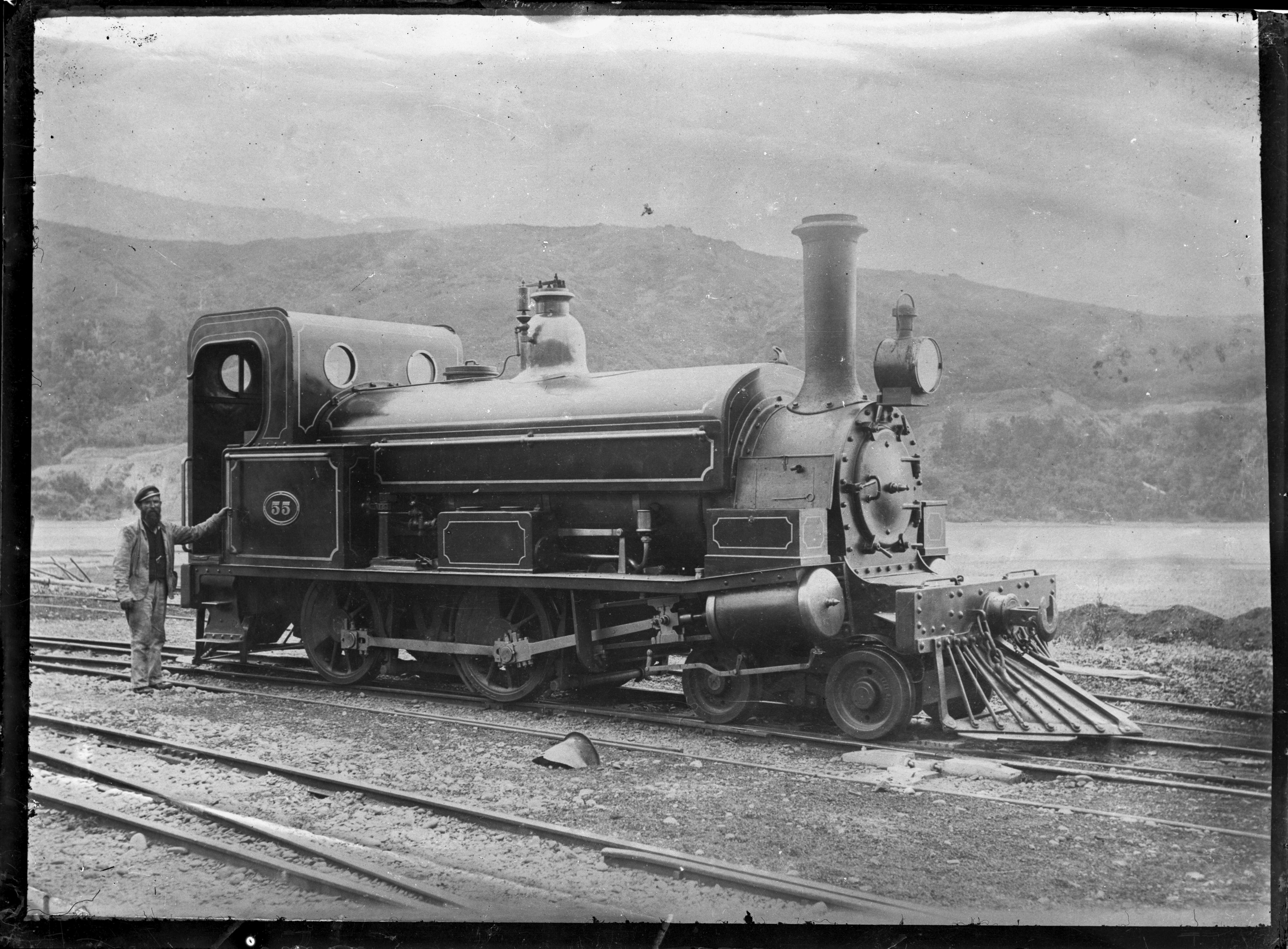
- G Class steam locomotive, NZR 55
Type and origin
- Builder: Black, Hawthorn & Co (4)
- Build date: 1873
Specifications
- Configuration
  - Whyte: 4-4-0ST
- Driver dia.: 36 in (0.914 m)
- Adhesive weight: 13.2 long tons (13.4 t; 14.8 short tons)
- Loco weight: 18.2 long tons (18.5 tonnes; 20.4 short tons)
- Firebox
  - Grate area: 9 sq ft (0.84 m^{2})
- Boiler pressure: 130 lbf/in^{2} (0.90 MPa)
- Heating surface: 486 sq ft (45.2 m^{2})
- Cylinders: Two, outside
- Cylinder size: 10.5 in × 18 in (267 mm × 457 mm)
Performance figures
- Tractive effort: 4,893 lbf (21.77 kN)
Career
- Operators: NZR
- Disposition: All scrapped

The NZR G Class was a class of four saddle tank locomotives from English builders Black Hawthorn in the early 1870s. Like the similarly sized D class, they were an attempt to produce a passenger version of the highly successful F class.

== Origin and design ==
The G class was ordered by the Canterbury Provincial Council. They were derived from the F class, replacing the lead driving axle with a four-wheel bogie. It was hoped that the leading wheels would allow them to run speed passenger services at higher speeds. However the class suffered from poor adhesive weight, a driver stating that "it took the 'G' all its time to push its front bogie along, let alone pull a load". They were followed by the L Class which were more successful as a faster F Class.

== Service ==
In the early 1890s the locomotives were progressively transferred to the Picton section, where they were out of the way of the busy Hurunui-Bluff section. Their maximum load on the 1 in 37 gradient from Picton was six 4-wheel wagons.

== Withdrawal and disposal ==
All of the locomotives were withdrawn between 1915 and 1919 and were sold for further service in industry. One member from the Castlecliff Branch was subject to a preservation attempt however due to a translation error a Barclay steam locomotive, No. 1749 was sent instead while the G class member was scrapped. The Barclay locomotive is now at the Silverstream Railway in operation.

== See also ==
- NZR F class
- NZR F^{A} / F^{B}
- NZR L class
- NZR L^{A} class
- Locomotives of New Zealand
