= NZR F class =

Class of New Zealand steam locomotives

New Zealand F class
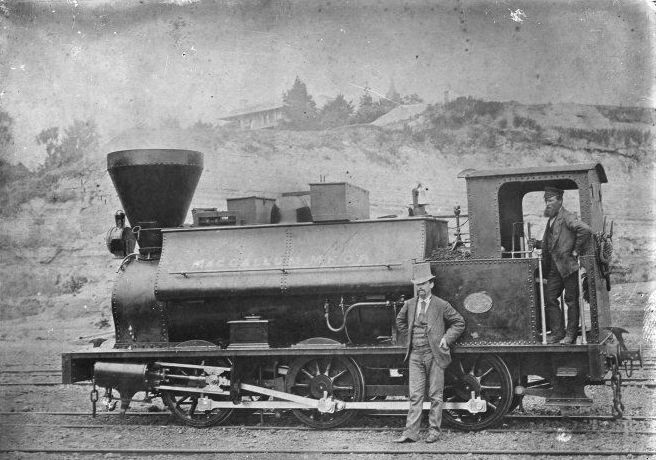
- F Class steam locomotive NZR 248 "McCallum Mhor", 0-6-0T type. Godber Collection, Alexander Turnbull Library.
Type and origin
- Power type: Steam
- Builder: Neilson & Co. (12); Dübs & Co. (21); Vulcan Foundry (5); Avonside Engine Co. (26); Robert Stephenson and Company (12); Yorkshire Engine Company (11); Black, Hawthorn & Co (1)
- Total produced: 88
Specifications
- Configuration
  - Whyte: 0-6-0ST
- Driver dia.: 36 in (914 mm)
- Wheelbase: 10 ft 6 in (3,200 mm)
- Length: 23 ft 3 1/2 in (7,099 mm)
- Loco weight: 19.2 long tons (21.5 short tons; 19.5 tonnes)
- Fuel type: Coal
- Fuel capacity: 0.95 long tons (1.06 short tons; 0.97 tonnes)
- Water cap.: 350 imp gal (1,600 L; 420 US gal)
- Firebox
  - Grate area: 9.5 sq ft (0.88 m^{2})
- Boiler pressure: 130 psi (0.90 MPa)
- Heating surface: 486 sq ft (45.2 m^{2})
- Cylinders: Two, outside
- Cylinder size: 10.5 in × 18 in (267 mm × 457 mm)
Performance figures
- Tractive effort: 5,733 lbf (25.50 kN)
Career
- Nicknames: Peveril/Edie Ochiltree (13) Meg Merrilies (180); Rob Roy (111); Ada (233) McCallum Mhor (248)
- Disposition: 15 preserved, remainder scrapped

The NZR F class was the first important class of steam locomotive built to operate on New Zealand's railway network after the national gauge of 3 ft 6 in (1,067 mm) was adopted. The first locomotives built for the new gauge railways were two E class double Fairlies for the Dunedin and Port Chalmers Railway Company. The F class was the first class ordered by the central government, and between 1872 and 1888, a total of eighty-eight members of the class were constructed.

== Design ==
The F class was an 0-6-0ST. They operated essentially everywhere on New Zealand's railway network doing various jobs. F class locomotives could haul light passenger trains at speeds up to 70 km/h (43 mph) or pull up to 800 tonnes (790 long tons; 880 short tons) of freight on flat trackage. Originally the design was meant for use on the Southland's railways, and three prototypes were built by Neilsons of Glasgow in 1872; among these was what would become F 13 Peveril, now preserved at the Ferrymead Railway in Christchurch.

== Names ==
The engines were originally given names from the works of Sir Walter Scott by order of a government official. Originally some had New Zealand names; for example, F 36 (later F 13) was originally named Clutha, and later renamed Edie Ochiltree. F 11 was Rob Roy, F 13 Peveril, F 72 Bothwell, F 73 Saladin and F 74 Roswald. Some were at times classified as the O class as these had Cartazzi axles, but by the nationwide renumbering of 1890 all were classified F. By this time none of the engines carried names any more.

== In service ==
The F class had originally been conceived as a mainline mixed-traffic tank locomotive, and their capabilities exceeded the expectation of even Charles Rous-Marten, who wrote of having observed them in all manner of duties while in New Zealand. As time went on and lines were extended, it became clear that the F class could no longer keep running as it did on the mainline, and so larger engines were introduced, thus pushing the F class to branch line and shunting duties.

The class is unique in that it has been used on every line in New Zealand to be operated by New Zealand Railways, some were operated by the Public Works Department. Several were also owned by the Westport Harbour Board, whose assets were later acquired by the NZR. In all, a total of 88 were acquired by the government and by various private railways, notably the Westport Harbour Board and the Thames Valley & Rotorua Railway (TVRR).

Not all of the 88 locomotives were in NZR service at one time. One locomotive, Neilson 1842, was sold to the Public Works Department before the nationwide numbering scheme of 1890 was implemented. Another twelve locomotives were rebuilt as F^{A} class 0-6-2T locomotives. This ensured that only 75 engines of the type were in service with the NZR at any one time, given the length of the period over which NZR acquired these engines.

By the 1940s, the F class were in retreat with the largest concentrations being in Christchurch, Invercargill, and Greymouth, where they were still used for shunting duties. The Christchurch locomotives were retained to shunt the Lyttelton wharves (their short wheelbase gave them greater operational flexibility), while the Invercargill locomotives were retained as shunters and also to shunt a dairy factory siding at Edendale; here, verandah beside the siding limited clearances and the F class were the only locomotives able to negotiate this siding without any trouble.

From this period onwards, many of the locomotives were replaced with the arrival of the D^{S} class 0-6-0DM diesel locomotives. The Invercargill locomotives were withdrawn by the end of the 1950s, as were the two Greymouth examples, F 5 and F 277, which were dumped at Omoto, 2 km from Greymouth, along with other withdrawn locomotives and wagons in an attempt to control erosion of the railway embankment at Omoto by the Grey River.

The last allocation for the F class was at Lyttelton, where their short wheelbase allowed them to run over the sharp curves on the wharves. The last two in service, F 13 and F 163, were withdrawn in 1963. Before this, both locomotives were overhauled and repainted in an approximation of the green livery used in the 1870s and named Peveril (F 13) and Ivanhoe (F 163) respectively. After taking part in the NZR centenary celebrations at the Christchurch Railway Station in 1963, both were placed in the Arthur's Pass locomotive shed with W 192 for safekeeping. In 1968, NZR donated F 13 to the New Zealand Railway and Locomotive Society Canterbury Branch for their Ferrymead Railway, and it was steamed from Arthur's Pass to Christchurch with a special excursion train.

== Industrial service ==
The F class was one of the most versatile locomotives in NZR service, and this was also true of these locomotives in industrial service. As larger and more powerful locomotives started to displace the F class from regular service, many were sold into industrial service, working at coal mines, sawmills, and freezing works. Following the withdrawal of F 13 and F 163 in 1963, F class locomotives continued to work in the bush or at a coal mine.

The F class, while successful on the NZR network, did not succeed on the roughly laid bush tramways of New Zealand. Being heavier than the older A, C, and D class tank locomotives used on bush trams before, operators who used F class locomotives had to upgrade the standard of their track to accommodate these locomotives. Despite this, the locomotives were relatively reliable, and some were fitted with extra bunkers behind their cabs to increase their small fuel capacity.

The other applications where the F class found a useful second life were at freezing works and coal mines. Here, the locomotives were used as shunters, and in the case of coal mines, to run trains of empty NZR wagons to the loading bins and loaded wagons back to the NZR connection. These lines were usually of a higher standard than the bush tramways, and so no track modifications were required to accommodate these engines.

As the locomotives were particularly suited to conversion to petrol or diesel power, several locomotives were rebuilt as diesel locomotives when their boilers expired. The Auckland Farmers Freezing Company (AFFCo) had three such steam to diesel conversions, one at Moerewa, one at Auckland's Export Wharf, and another at Horotiu, in the 1960s, while Butler Bros. sawmill at Ruatapu on the West Coast had another.

== Withdrawal ==
The majority of the class was scrapped between the late 1940s and late 1960s as diesel traction took over their traditional duties and younger steam locomotives were cascaded down onto shunting work, which the F class excelled at. The last strongholds of the class were Southland and Lyttelton – at Lyttelton the engines shunted the wharves, while in Southland, the Southland Dairy Co-operative required an F class engine to shunt its Edendale works as these were the only engines that could pass a verandah that stood too close to the tracks for other types to be able to safely shunt the siding.

Two Greymouth engines, F 5 and F 277, were dumped at Omoto in 1957 following their withdrawal. F 277 was unique in that it had a larger cab than the standard engines. Another two locomotives were dumped at Oamaru Locomotive Dump in 1930 but their identities have not been proven as the locomotives have since been pulled into the harbour by the undertow.

The last three F class engines in service were engines F 13 and F 163 in Christchurch, and F 180 at Eastown Workshops. In 1965, F 180 was named Meg Merrilies (which supposedly was the engine's original name, though this has not been verified), and donated to the Museum of Transport and Technology. F 13 and F 163 were both painted in green and named Peveril and Ivanhoe respectively, and used in 1963 for the NZR's centenary celebrations. Neither was withdrawn until 1965, when F 163 was placed in storage at Arthur's Pass with W 192. By 1968 the class was extinct in NZR ownership with the exception of F 163, retained for nostalgic purposes. F 13, meanwhile, was donated to the NZR&LS Canterbury Branch in 1968.

In 1985, F 163 was transferred to Palmerston North and was overhauled by off-duty NZR workers and railfans to ready the engine for the centenary of the Wellington and Manawatu Railway. It then spent another decade based at Palmerston North, before being transferred to Feilding. F 163 is the sole member of the once 88-strong class to be certified for mainline running.

== Overseas use ==
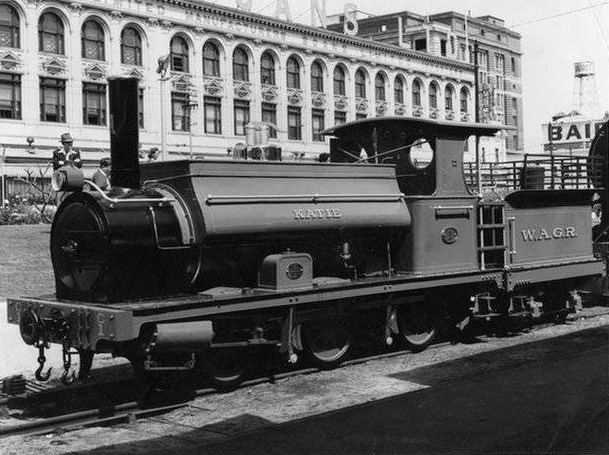
C 1 on display at Perth railway station, 1956. Note the similarity to the NZR F class including the cab coal bunkers which were retained during the conversion.

The 3 ft 6 in (1,067 mm) gauge Riotinto Railway of Spain ordered two similar locomotives from Neilson in 1875, works numbers 1950/51. A third locomotive of this type, Neilson 3611, was ordered in 1887. Although largely the same as the NZR locomotives, they had a larger cylinder diameter. None of these locomotives have survived.

Two more locomotives were built by Stephensons to this design, as their works numbers 2391/92, in 1880 for the Western Australian Government Railways as their C class. These locomotives were a direct match to the NZR F class and received the numbers C1 and C2 respectively. Due to their small fuel capacity, they were later rebuilt with two-axle tenders and modified cabs to become 0-6-0STT. It has been suggested by one railway website that the conversion of C1 was in fact due to an accident sustained in the period 1885–87.

Both locomotives worked around Perth until the early 1900s, by which time C1 had been sold in 1899 to a sawmill. It last steamed in 1940 but was purchased by WAGR in 1956 and restored at their Midland Workshops before being placed on display at the Perth railway station. It has since moved into preservation with the Australian Railway Historical Society at their Bassendean Railway Museum.

== Preserved locomotives ==
Nine examples of the class have been preserved, including several in full running order:

- F 12 – Ferrymead Railway, unrestored, used for spare parts. The locomotive is owned by the New Zealand Railway and Locomotive Society. The cab is owned by the Ocean Beach Railway, Dunedin, and the rest of the locomotive is stored in the carriage shed at Ferrymead as a source of spare parts for F 13.
- F 13 – Ferrymead Railway, "Peveril", from the original batch of five built-in 1872; in service. The locomotive returned to steam in late 2014 and is now in regular service at Ferrymead. It is the oldest operating steam locomotive in New Zealand.
- F 111 – Ocean Beach Railway, under restoration. The chassis and body have been restored, but the engine requires a new boiler before it can steam again.
- F 150 – Southern Steam Train Charitable Trust, under restoration. This engine is being restored in Invercargill with completion expected in 2026.
- F 163 – Feilding and District Steam Rail Society, "Ivanhoe", operational. This locomotive is owned by the Rail Heritage Trust but leased to F&DSRS. F 163 is currently mainline-certified and is the only F class locomotive to have this certification.
- F 180 – Meg Merrilies Museum of Transport and Technology, operational. Last ran on NZR 1966. This engine was completed in 2018 after a long-term restoration, first ran in preservation on 19 August 2018.
- F 185 – Bush Tramway Club, stored. This engine was donated to the BTC by the State Mines Department in 1972.
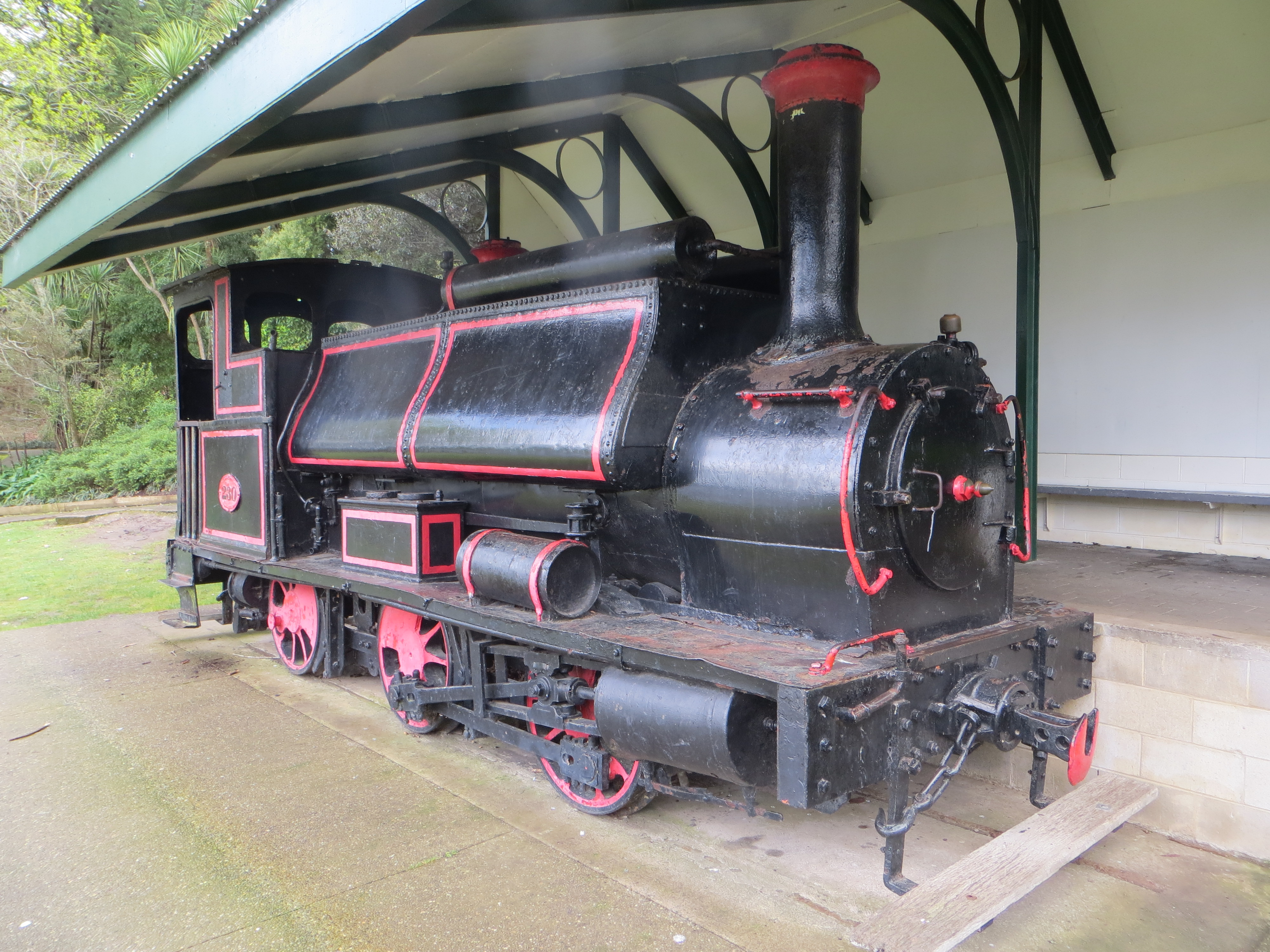
- F230 displayed at Hamilton Lake Rotoroa Reserve
  F 230 – Hamilton Lake Rotoroa Reserve, static display. This engine was donated by Ellis & Burnand to the City of Hamilton in 1956 after working at E&B's Mangapehi sawmill for ten years. Its boiler was filled with concrete and some of the locomotive's parts were removed including the fireman's side rods and the trailing side-rod on the driver's side which has converted the locomotive to an impromptu 0-4-2ST. The information board on the rear of the cab says F 230 worked at Palmerston North, Napier and Wellington, before being sold to Napier Harbour Board in 1933 and Ellis & Burnand in 1945. It says it was "in complete working trim" when moved to the park.
- F 233 – Glenbrook Vintage Railway, awaiting restoration. Owned by the Railway Enthusiasts Society, and formerly displayed at their Onehunga clubrooms.

Four other F class locomotives were preserved as diesel-powered conversions:

- F 40 – Bay of Islands Vintage Railway, chassis only. The remains of this locomotive have largely been scrapped.
- F 162 – Museum of Transport and Technology, chassis only.
- F 216 – Bush Tramway Club, Pukemiro. This was the last F class engine built in 1888.
- F 228 – Museum of Transport and Technology, chassis only.

== See also ==
- NZR F^{A} / F^{B}
- NZR G class (1874)
- NZR L class
- NZR L^{A} class
- Locomotives of New Zealand
