= 1926 Chatham Cup =

Tournament details
- Venue(s): Basin Reserve, Wellington
- Dates: 5 June – 4 September 1926

Final positions
- Champions: Sunnyside (1st title)
- Runners-up: North Shore

The 1926 Chatham Cup was the fourth annual nationwide knockout football competition in New Zealand.

The competition was run on a regional basis, with eight regional associations (Northland, Auckland, Wellington, Waikato, Wanganui, Manawatu, Canterbury and Otago) each holding separate qualifying rounds. In all, 36 teams entered the 1926 competition, with the overwhelming majority being from the North Island.

In the South Auckland District there were four entries from Pukemiro, Huntly, Huntly Thistle and Frankton Railways. Huntly Thisle won the South Auckland qualifiers and the North Auckland - South Auckland final, before being defeated by North Shore in the overall Auckland District final.

The Manawatu Football Association initially recorded four entries. St. Andrew's, Palmerston North Returned Services Association, Palmerston North Athletic and Palmerston North Rangers. Rangers later withdrew from the competition without partaking.

One unusual feature of the 1926 competition was that three of the four semi-finalist sides were composed largely of staff from three of the country's largest mental hospitals, at Sunnyside, Porirua, and Seacliff.

Seacliff was the single entry from Otago, and at an early stage there was discussion in regard to including the Dunedin side competing in the Wellington FA provincial rounds. This did not eventuate, and Seacliff were directly through to the South Island Final against Sunnyside.

There were four entries from North Auckland. Hikurangi, Waro Wanderers, Waro Corinthians and Whangārei YMCA.

== The 1926 final ==
The final was played at the Basin Reserve, Wellington, a change of venue from the previous finals which had been at Newtown Park or Athletic Park. The following year the final briefly returned to Newtown Park, before making its permanent home at the Basin Reserve, a venue which was used regularly until the 1970s.

In the final, played in front of some 4000 spectators, Sunnyside's Archie Trotter became the first player to complete a Chatham Cup final hat-trick. The match was high scoring, but contemporary reports suggest that many opportunities were missed by both teams. H. Pickering put Sunnyside in front after just seven minutes. Archie Trotter doubled the lead for Sunnyside before L. Hipkins scored for North Shore. After the half-time interval Trotter scored two further goals before John Woolley scored a late consolation for North Shore.

Other notable features of the final included the appearance in the North Shore team of Reg Baxter, Dan Jones, and Ces Dacre. Baxter and Jones were the first players to play for two different sides in Chatham Cup finals, having been part of the successful 1923 Seacliff and 1924 Auckland Harbour Board teams respectively. Dacre, while a fine player and New Zealand representative at football, is best remembered as one of New Zealand's foremost early cricketers.

Post-final at the weekly meeting of the Auckland Football Association in early September, the secretary, Mr. Dawson reported to the committee. The treatment by the New Zealand Council was praised, though the Wellington Football Association, in Dawson's opinion, had profiteered by insisting the payment of £20 over and above the rent due to the Wellington City Council for use of the Basin Reserve.

== Results ==
=== Auckland Qualifiers ===
12 June 1926

Ponsonby	2 – 5	Northcote
Hunter, W. Knott,	Report	Hall ×2, Burford, Bell, Tremain

Blandford Park, Auckland
Referee: Mr. R. H. Parfitt
12 June 1926

Tramways	2 – 3	Auckland YMCA
Davis, Spencer	Report	Mellor ×2, own goal

Blandford Park, Auckland
Referee: Mr. E. Parkinson
12 June 1926

North Shore	5 – 0	Chelsea 2nds
Hipkins, Palmer, Woolley, Dacre, Baxter	Report

Devonport Domain, Auckland
Referee: Mr. J. Ball
12 June 1926

Onehunga Athletic Club	2 – 11	Auckland Thistle

Onehunga No.1, Manukau, Auckland
Referee: Mr. A. E. Brownlie
10 July 1926

North Shore	3 - 2 (a.e.t.)	Northcote
Woolley, Palmer, Bradshaw	Report	Bell ×2

Blandford Park, Auckland
Auckland final
24 July 1926

North Shore	3 – 1	Auckland Thistle
Woolley, Bird ×2	Report	Kernick

Blandford Park, Auckland
Referee: Mr. L.C.H. Dawson

=== North Auckland Qualifiers ===
19 June 1926

Hikurangi	? – ? *	Whangarei YMCA

Hora Hora Park, Whangārei
Referee: Mr. F. Mogford
19 June 1926

Waro Wanderers	? – ? *	Waro Corinthians

Hotel Park, Hikurangi
Referee: Mr. J. Donnelly

* Both results from Hikurangi v Y.M.C.A and Waro Corinthians v Waro Wanderers fixture's scheduled by the North Auckland Association for June 19 are yet to be found. Waro Wanderers played Hikurangi in the North Auckland District Final on July 17.

North Auckland District Final
17 July 1926

Hikurangi	2 – 2 (a.e.t.) Replayed 22 July	Waro Wanderers
Ackers 2.	Report	Turtington (goal-keeper) og, Jty. Platt.

Recreation Park, Hikurangi
Referee: Mr. F. Mogford
North Auckland District Final Replay
22 July 1926

Hikurangi	4 – 0 *	Waro Wanderers
J. Ackers x4: Hikurangi (red card)	Report	Waro (red card)

Recreation Park, Hikurangi
Referee: Mr. F. Mogford

* Two players sent from field.

=== South Auckland Qualifiers ===
3 July 1926

Huntly Thistle	6 – 1	Pukemiro
Longstaff ×3, McLuckie, Johnson ×2	Report	Garrick

Huntly Domain, Huntly
South Auckland District Final
17 July 1926

Huntly	1 – 6 *	Huntly Thistle
Emerson	Report	White ×3, Longstaff ×2, Patrick.

Huntly Recreation Ground, Huntly
Referee: Mr. Jas Baillie

* Frankton Railways defaulted to Huntly. Huntly played v Huntly Thistle with 10 men.

North Auckland - South Auckland Final
24 July 1926

Hikurangi	0 – 4	Huntly Thistle
	Report	T. Gavin, H. Johnson, R. Longstaff 2.

Recreation Park, Hikurangi
Referee: Mr. R. Nesbitt
Auckland District Final
14 August 1926

Huntly Thistle	1 – 3	North Shore
Johnstone	Report	Jay ×2, Dacre

Huntly Recreation Ground
Attendance: 2000+
Referee: Mr. Jas Baillie (Hamilton)

=== Wellington Qualifiers ===
5 June 1926

Petone	3 – 3 Extra time not played due to fading light	Johnsonville
Hamilton ×2, Paterson	Report	Johnstone ×2, ?

Kelburn Park, Wellington
Referee: Mr. G. Goffin
Replay
12 June 1926

Petone	4 – 0	Johnsonville
Brislee ×3, Paterson	Report

Basin Reserve No. 2, Wellington
Referee: Mr. E. Watts
19 June 1926

Hospital	6 – 0	Waterside
Newman ×4, Ferguson, Lambert	Report

Porirua Hospital Ground, Porirua
Referee: Mr. C. Kelly
19 June 1926

Wellington Marist	3 - 2 (a.e.t.)	Petone
Thomas, McElligott, Marshment	Report	Paterson, Pincock

Kelburn Park, Wellington
Referee: Mr. F. Hall
19 June 1926

Wellington Thistle	3 – 1	Institute Old Boys
Jeffrey, Logan ×2	Report	Maddocks

Basin Reserve, Wellington
Referee: Mr. G. Jackson
19 June 1926

Wellington YMCA	7 – 2	Seatoun
McGirr, Worth ×2, Dempster ×2, Orr ×2	Report	Telford, Murie

Basin Reserve, Wellington
Referee: Mr. G. Wilson
26 June 1926

Hospital	1 – 0	Wellington Thistle
Ferguson	Report

Porirua Hospital Ground, Porirua
Referee: Mr. G. Jackson
26 June 1926

Wellington YMCA	2 – 0	Wellington Marist
Wilkins ×2	Report

Basin Reserve, Wellington
Referee: Mr. E. Goffin
Wellington final
24 July 1926

Hospital	3 – 2	Wellington YMCA
Newman ×3		Wilkins, Worth

Basin Reserve, Wellington
Referee: Mr. L.F.C. Cooper

=== Manawatu Qualifiers ===
3 July 1926

Palmerston North Returned Services Association	2 – 1	St. Andrews
Baigent, Contaur	Report	Hart

North Street Park, Palmerston North
Referee: Mr. J. Davidson
Manawatu District Final
10 July 1926

Palmerston North Athletic	1 – 0	Palmerston North Returned Services Association
Whitehouse.	Report

North Street Park, Palmerston North
Referee: Mr. H. Crouch

=== Wanganui Qualifier ===
Wanganui District Final
26 June 1926

Wanganui Woollen Mills	4 – 3	Eastown Workshops
MacDonald ×4	Report	Smith ×2, Mackley

Cooks Gardens, Wanganui
Referee: Mr. F. Phillips
Manawatu - Wanganui District Final
24 July 1926

Palmerston North Athletic	4 – 3	Wanganui Woollen Mills
Whitehouse ×2, Salmon ×2	Report	MacDonald ×3

North Street Park, Palmerston North
Referee: Mr. H. Crouch
Wellington - Manawatu Final
7 August 1926

Palmerston North Athletic	2 – 7	Hospital
Whitehouse ×2	Report	Newman ×3, Ferguson ×2, White, Anderson

North Street Park, Palmerston North
Referee: Rev. Duncombe

=== Canterbury Qualifiers ===
Canterbury semi-final
10 July 1926

Western	1 – 1	Nomads
Barwell	Report	Ives

English Park, Christchurch
Referee: Mr. Stout
17 July 1926

Western	2 – 0 Replay	Nomads
Colville, Nelson	Report

English Park, Christchurch
Referee: Mr. H. Mayo
Canterbury semi-final
10 July 1926

Sunnyside	4 – 1	Christchurch Thistle
Trotter ×2, Pickering, Robson	Report	Thomas.

English Park, Christchurch
Referee: Mr. H. Smyth
Canterbury Final
24 July 1926

Sunnyside	3 – 0	Western
Trotter ×2, Robson.	Report

English Park, Christchurch
Referee: Mr. H. Smyth

=== Semi-finals ===
North Island Final
28 August 1926

North Shore	4 – 3 (aet)	Hospital
Jay ×2,Dacre, Baxter	Report	Lambert, Anderson, Newman

Blandford Park, Auckland
Referee: Mr. H.W. Riddalls
South Island Final
2 August 1926

Seacliff	3 – 4	Sunnyside
Hooper,, McDougall, Anderson (pen.)	Report	Trotter ×2, Sutherland, Wales

Culling Park, Dunedin
Referee: Mr. W. P. Smith

=== 1926 Final ===
Teams

Sunnyside: Jim Callaghan, J. Simpson, H. Thompson, Archie Trotter, W. Robson, W. Bond, R. Purdie, H. Pickering, D. Sutherland, Bob McLachlan, Jim Wales

North Shore: Stewart Lipscombe, Len Colebourne, Peter Gerrard, Reg Baxter, Dick Bird, Dan Jones, L. Hipkins, Ces Dacre, George Jay, John Woolley, Jock Bradshaw.

1926 Chatham Cup Final
4 September 1926

Sunnyside	4 – 2	North Shore
Trotter ×3, Pickering	report	Hipkins, Woolley

Basin Reserve, Wellington
Referee: Mr. G. Kelly
