= 1925 Chatham Cup =

Tournament details
- Venue(s): Newtown Park, Wellington
- Dates: 30 May – 19 September 1925

Final positions
- Champions: Wellington YMCA (1st title)
- Runners-up: Seacliff

The 1925 Chatham Cup was the third annual nationwide knockout football competition in New Zealand.

The competition was run on a regional basis. Each region held its own contest to find a regional champion, with these then being grouped into four regional associations (Auckland, Wellington, Canterbury, and Otago), each of which was represented in semi-finals by one team, followed by northern and southern semi-finals and a national final.

== Entrants ==
In all, 30 teams took part in the competition, though some contemporary reports say there were 29. Ten of these teams were from the Wellington area, nine from Auckland, and three from Christchurch. Confusion is caused by some contemporary reports which list the Pukemiro team as "Huntly", despite these being two separate sides from the same area.

Auckland

- Auckland Harbour Board
- Auckland Thistle
- Auckland YMCA
- Hellabys
- Northcote
- North Shore
- Ponsonby
- Royal Navy
- Tramways

South Auckland (Waikato)

- Frankton Railways
- Huntly
- Pukemiro
- Rotowaro

Hawke's Bay

- Hastings United

Manawatu

- Palmerston North Returned Services Association
- Palmerston North Rangers
- Palmerston North Athletic
- Foxton
- St. Andrews

Wellington

- Brooklyn
- Diamond
- Hospital
- Johnsonville
- Scottish Wanderers
- Waterside
- Institute Old Boys
- Wellington Marist
- Wellington Thistle
- Wellington YMCA

Canterbury

- Nomads
- Rangers
- Sunnyside
- Lyttelton

North Otago

- Oamaru Rangers

Otago

- Seacliff

== The 1925 final ==
The final was played at Newtown Park, Wellington, a change of venue from the previous finals which had been at Athletic Park. This new venue was to host the final again in 1927, with the Basin Reserve being preferred as a permanent venue from 1928 after its use in 1926. The 1925 final was part of an unusual double-bill, the ground also being used on the same day for a rugby league match between the New Zealand team and a touring Queensland representative XIII.

The final was the first re-match of two teams who had previously contested a final; six Seacliff players and four YWCA players played in both the 1923 and 1925 finals. The game was described in The Dominion as entertaining with a number of chances, as was reflected by the scoreline, which was 2–2 at full time. The first goal came from Stewart Dempster for YMCA, but Wattie Hanlin equalised before the half-time interval. In the second half Seacliff went into the lead through Bill Hooper, who became the first player to score in two separate finals, having previously scored in Seacliff's 1923 win. this time it was YMCA who equalised with a second goal from Dempster. Dave Halley grabbed the winner for the Wellington side early in the first period of extra time.

== Qualifying Rounds ==
=== Auckland Qualifiers ===
30 May 1925

North Shore	3 –1	Northcote
Palmer ×2, Woolley	Report	W. Knott (pen.)

Blandford Park, Auckland
Attendance: 2000
Referee: Mr. S. Masters
3 June 1925

Auckland Thistle	3 – 2	Royal Navy
Dodds, Humphries ×2	Report	Kernick, Merritt (pen.)

Victoria Park, Auckland
Attendance: 3000
Referee: Mr. P. Marsh
3 June 1925

Ponsonby	3 – 1	Tramways
Kennedy ×2, Innes	Report	Lewis

Auckland Domain, Auckland
Referee: Mr. G. T. Lee
3 June 1925

Hellabys	1 – 0	North Shore
	Report

Victoria Park, Auckland
Referee: Mr. F. Knightley
3 June 1925

Auckland YMCA	5 – 1	Auckland Harbour Board
	Report

Blandford Park, Auckland
Referee: Mr. L. Parkinson
Auckland Semi Final
11 July 1925

Hellabys	1 – 2	Ponsonby
Margison	Report	Christie, Adshead

Blandford Park, Auckland
Referee: Mr. G. T. Lee
Auckland Semi Final
11 July 1925

Auckland Thistle	6 – 1	Auckland YMCA
Humphries ×5, Dunsmore	Report	Marshall

Blandford Park, Auckland
Referee: Mr. J. Ball
Auckland Final
1 August 1925

Ponsonby	2 - 1	Auckland Thistle
Kennedy, Ahern	Report	Ritchie (pen.)

Blandford Park, Auckland
Attendance: 7000
Referee: Mr. F. Marsh

=== Wellington Qualifiers ===
13 June 1925

Diamond	3 –1	Wellington Institute
Dickinson, McLeod, Calvert 'og'	Report	Kallaher

Association Park, Wellington
Referee: Mr. L. F. C. Cooper
13 June 1925

Wellington Thistle	4 – 2	Waterside
Logan ×3, Wallace	Report	Stanbridge ×2

Newtown Park, Wellington
Referee: Mr. C. Kelly
27 June 1925

Hospital	6 – 2	Johnsonville
Smith, Mullins, Hughes ×2, Simmons, Ring (Johnsonville) og.	Report	McFarlane, Gibbs (Hospital) og.

Hospital Ground, Porirua
Referee: Mr. C. Kelly
27 June 1925

Wellington Thistle	3 – 2	Diamond
Wallace ×2, Logan	Report	J. McLeod, R. McLeod

Association Park, Wellington
Referee: Mr. A.E. Wells
27 June 1925

Scottish Wanderers	2 – 1	Wellington Marist
Lothian, Galbraith	Report	Costello

Association Park, Wellington
Referee: Mr. L. F. C. Cooper
27 June 1925

Wellington YMCA	3 – 0	Brooklyn
Ballard, Campbell, Eton	Report

Kelburn Park, Wellington
Referee: Mr. C. Udy
Wellington Semi Final
4 July 1925

Hospital	0 - 1	Scottish Wanderers
	Report	Golbright

Porirua Lunatic Asylum, Porirua
Referee: Mr. A. E. Wells
Wellington Semi Final
4 July 1925

Wellington YMCA	2 – 1	Wellington Thistle
Dempster, Nicolle	Report	Lennox (red card)

Association Park, Wellington
Referee: Mr. E. Ormrod
Wellington Final
18 July 1925

Wellington YMCA	2 – 0	Scottish Wanderers
Dempster, Ballard	Report

Basin Reserve, Wellington
Referee: Mr. G. Goffin

=== South Auckland (Waikato) Qualifiers ===
South Auckland (Waikato) Semi Final
20 June 1925

Rotowaro	3 - 0	Frankton Railways
Oliver ×2, Buller	Report

Rotowaro Ground, Rotowaro
Referee: Mr. J. Wallace
South Auckland (Waikato) Semi Final
27 June 1925

Huntly	0 - 2 Huntly protested the result	Pukemiro
	Report

Huntly Recreation Ground, Huntly
Referee: Mr. G. Shand
South Auckland (Waikato) Semi Final Replay
11 July 1925

Huntly	0 – 2	Pukemiro
	Report	Drennan ×2

Huntly Recreation Ground, Huntly
Referee: Mr. R. J. Brookes (Auckland)
South Auckland (Waikato) Final
25 July 1925

Pukemiro	2 – 1	Rotowaro
Drinnan, Black	Report	Garrick (pen.)

Huntly Recreation Ground, Huntly
Referee: Mr. J. Wallace

=== Manawatu Qualifiers ===
27 June 1925

St. Andrews	v RSA won by default	Palmerston North Returned Services Association
	Report

North Street Park, Palmerston North

St. Andrews continued to question the Manawatu Football Association's decision into mid July 1925.

11 July 1925

Palmerston North Athletic	3 - 0 aet	Foxton
Hearsey ×2, Wheeler	Report

North Street Park, Palmerston North
Referee: Mr. J. Forbes
11 July 1925

Palmerston North Returned Services Association	2 - 0	Palmerston North Rangers
Contaur, Baigent	Report

North Street Park #2, Palmerston North
Referee: Mr. Duncumb
Manawatu Final
18 July 1925

Palmerston North Returned Services Association	4 - 2	Palmerston North Athletic
Stevens ×2, Baigent ×2	Report	Hearsey, Fitzgerald

North Street Park, Palmerston North
Referee: Mr. Duncumb
Manawatu/Hawkes Bay Final
25 July 1925

Hastings United	v RSA won by default	Palmerston North Returned Services Association
	Report

Cornwall Park, Hastings

=== Canterbury Qualifiers ===
Canterbury Semi Final
11 July 1925

Christchurch Rangers	2 - 2	Lyttelton
Gibson ×2 Howarth (red card) McGilp (red card)	Report	Parle ×2 Wales (red card)

Sunnyside Hospital, Christchurch
Referee: Mr. Robinson
Canterbury Semi Final
11 July 1925

Nomads	1 - 0	Sunnyside
C. McDougall	Report

English Park, Christchurch
Referee: Mr. Stout
Canterbury Semi Final Replay
18 July 1925

Christchurch Rangers	3 - 1	Lyttelton
Gibson, Norman, Barwell	Report	Parle

English Park
Referee: Mr. W. Smythe

=== Quarter-finals ===
Auckland/South Auckland (Waikato) Final
17 August 1925

Pukemiro	0 - 4	Ponsonby
	Report	Innes ×2, Neesham, Kennedy

Huntly Domain, Huntly
Attendance: 1000
Referee: Mr. J. Wallace
Wellington/Manawatu Final
1 August 1925

Wellington YMCA	5 – 0	Palmerston North Returned Services Association
Dempster ×3, Campbell ×2	Report

Basin Reserve, Wellington
Referee: Mr. G. Cox
Otago Final
18 July 1925

Seacliff	7 – 0	Oamaru Rangers
Hooper ×3, Simmons ×2, Cooper ×2	Report

Seacliff Lunatic Asylum, Seacliff
Referee: Mr. W. P. Smith
Canterbury Final
25 July 1925

Nomads	5 - 1	Christchurch Rangers
J. McDougall ×3, Graham (pen.), C. McDougall	Report	Barwell

English Park, Christchurch
Referee: Mr. F. Campbell

=== Semi-finals ("Island finals") ===
South Island Final
1 August 1925

Nomads	0 – 2	Seacliff
	Report	Hooper ×2

English Park, Christchurch
Attendance: 2000
Referee: Mr. W. Campbell
North Island Final
22 August 1925

Ponsonby	1 – 2	Wellington YMCA
Cheeseman	Report	Dempster, Campbell

Blandford Park, Auckland

=== Final ===
Teams

Wellington YMCA: Albert Bentley, Horrie Prince, Les McGirr, W. Pearson, Neil MacArthur, Charlie Trott, Billy Nichols, Stewart Dempster, Dave Holly (or Halley), Charles Ballard, George Campbell.

Seacliff: R. Gwilliam, George Anderson, Bill Rogers, Alex Waugh, Wattie Cooper, Bill Murray, D. Milne, Malcolm Macdougall, Bill Hooper, Wattie Hanlin, J. Baillie.

1925 Chatham Cup Final
19 September 1925

Wellington YMCA	3 – 2 (aet)	Seacliff
Dempster ×2, Halley	Report	Hanlin, Hooper

Newtown Park, Wellington
Referee: Mr. E. Thornley (Christchurch)
