= 1924 Chatham Cup =

Tournament details
- Venue(s): Athletic Park, Wellington
- Dates: 26 April – 27 September 1924

Final positions
- Champions: Auckland Harbour Board (1st title)
- Runners-up: Seacliff

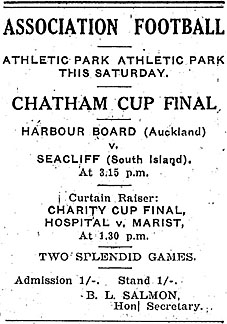
Advertisement in the New Zealand Truth newspaper for the final

The 1924 Chatham Cup was the second annual nationwide knockout football competition in New Zealand.

The competition was run on a regional basis, with the numerous local associations being grouped in with the four major regional associations (Auckland, Wellington, Canterbury, and Otago) in qualifying, with each of these four regions being represented in semi-finals by one team, followed by northern and southern semi-finals and a national final. Ten teams from the Wellington region took part, and it is known that Seacliff were the only Otago entrants (North Otago, the home of Oamaru Rangers, being counted as a separate region).

In the Waikato region (South Auckland FA) there were four entries from Pukemiro, Rotowaro, Junction Athletic (Pukemiro Junction) and Glen Massey. The South Auckland Football Association initially ran its cup qualifiers in conjunction with its local northern league fixtures eventually resulting in all four clubs being tied on the same points. The NZFA was consulted on a ruling which was then left in the hands of the South Auckland FA. The qualifying matches, without Rotowaro, were then rescheduled by the South Auckland FA in late July. Glen Massey then protested the arranged fixture at Pukemiro but the South Auckland FA chose not to act. The sole fixture for qualification from the South Auckland FA was played at Pukemiro on 28 July between Pukemiro and Pukemiro Junction Athletic.

Whakatu was the sole entry from Hawke's Bay. Hastings United intimated to the NZFA about joining the competition but the application was too late.

The Auckland representative for the competition was not chosen via a knock-out competition. This raised concerns in some quarters that the rules of the competition were not being adhered to. This was rectified in July when the Auckland Football Association decided to have a play-off between Harbour Board, the Auckland first division champions and YMCA the second division champions for both the Auckland championship title and the right to represent Auckland in the Chatham Cup.

== The 1924 final ==
The final was played in sodden conditions at Wellington. Seacliff took an early lead through W. Simmons, holding on to it until half-time. Harbour Board's Bill Palmer equalised with a header in the second half, and H.M. Margison scored two further goals, one in each half of extra time. The trophy was awarded to the winning team by Wellington Mayor Robert Wright. The losing semi-finalists contested a Charity Cup during the same weekend at the same venue, the match finishing in a 2–2 draw.

== Results ==
=== Manawatu Qualifiers ===
26 April 1924

Dawbers	2 - 1	Palmerston North Returned Services Association
Travers (pen.), Chapman	Report	Bell

North Street Park, Palmerston North
Referee: Mr. Forbes
26 April 1924

St. Andrews	w/o Foxton won by default	Foxton
	Report

North Street Park, Palmerston North
Referee: Mr. Crouch
Manawatu Final
3 May 1924

Foxton	0 - 5	Dawbers
	Report	Hearsey ×2, Tracey, Chapman ×2

Foxton, Foxton
Referee: Mr. C. W. Duncumb
Manawatu/Hawkes Bay Final
19 July 1924

Dawbers	5 – 1	Whakatu
Travers snr. ×3, Chapman, Davies	Report	J. Martin

North Street Park, Palmerston North
Referee: Mr. Crouch

=== Wellington Qualifiers ===
10 May 1924

Brooklyn	2 - 5	Diamond
Pridmore, Anton (pen.)	Report	McLeod, Daniels, Findlay, Bolt, McKee

Wakefield Park, Wellington
Referee: Mr. W. Press
10 May 1924

Welgasco	1 - 7	Waterside
Frame	Report	Case ×2, Patterson ×2, Gilbertson ×2, Nicolls, Dickinson

Newtown Park, Wellington
Referee: Mr. T. L. Meehan
10 May 1924

Wellington Marist	4 - 1	Wellington Thistle
McElligott, Barton ×2, Fitzgerald	Report	Hickey (og)

Association Park, Wellington
Referee: Mr. C. F. Ward
10 May 1924

Scottish Wanderers	0 - 1	Institute Old Boys
	Report	Rusterholtz

Association Park, Wellington
Referee: Mr. E. Ormrod
10 May 1924

Wellington YMCA	5 - 1	South Wellington
Campbell ×2, Phillips ×2, Trott	Report	(pen.)

Kelburn Park, Wellington
Referee: Mr. G. Arnold
17 May 1924

Hospital	4 – 3	Diamond
Gibbs, McDonald, Lambert ×2	Report	R. McGee, Findlay, Guest

Porirua Hospital, Porirua
Referee: Mr. E. Windley
17 May 1924

Waterside	2 – 1	Wellington YMCA B
Gilbertson, Nicholls	Report	Mitchell

Kilbirnie Park, Wellington
Referee: Mr. I. Wilson
17 May 1924

Institute Old Boys	5 – 2	Swifts
Jeffereys, Dempster, Reid, Barnes, N. Smith	Report	Elliott, Thomas

Kelburn Park, Wellington
Referee: Mr. B. L. Salmon
17 May 1924

Wellington YMCA A	2 – 2 (aet)	Wellington Marist
Barity, Hindmarsh	Report	Barton, Costello

Association Park, Wellington
Referee: Mr. F. Campbell
14 June 1924

Wellington Marist	2 – 1 Replay	Wellington YMCA A
Barton ×2	Report	McGirr

Basin Reserve, Wellington
Referee: Mr. F. Campbell
28 June 1924

Wellington Marist	3 – 2 (aet)	Institute Old Boys
Pope ×2, Burke	Report	Reid, Dempster

Basin Reserve, Wellington
Referee: G. Goffin
28 June 1924

Hospital	2 – 1	Waterside
Greenaway, Gibb	Report	Hughes

Porirua Hospital, Porirua
Referee: Mr. B. Martin
Wellington Final
7 July 1924

Wellington Marist	3 – 1	Hospital
Cudby, Costello, Barton		Ferguson

Basin Reserve, Wellington
Referee: Mr. S. Wilson
Manawatu/Wellington Final
2 August 1924

Dawbers	2 – 5	Wellington Marist
Chapman, Hearsey	Report	Pope ×2, McElligott ×2, Costello

Foxton, Foxton
Attendance: 400
Referee: Mr. Connolly (Wellington)

=== Otago Qualifier ===
Otago/North Otago Final
19 July 1924

Oamaru Rangers	0 - 4	Seacliff
	Report	Hanlin, Simmons, Burns, Murray

Takaro Park, Oamaru
Referee: Mr. Fogarty

=== Auckland Qualifiers ===
Auckland Final
19 July 1924

Auckland Harbour Board	5 - 0	Auckland YMCA
Jones, Bell, Palmer, Margison, Tocker	Report

Auckland Domain, Auckland
Referee: Mr. L. Dawson
South Auckland Final
28 July 1924

Pukemiro	0 - 2	Pukemiro Junction Athletic
	Report

Pukemiro, Huntly
South Auckland (Waikato)/Auckland Final
23 August 1924

Pukemiro Junction Athletic	0 – 3	Auckland Harbour Board
	Report	Jones 2 (1 pen.), Liddel

Seddon Park, Hamilton
Referee: Mr. J.M. Downie

Sunnyside qualified as Canterbury Football Association representative after leading the Christchurch club league after the first round.

=== Semi-finals ("Island finals") ===
South Island Final
2 August 1924

Sunnyside	1 – 1 (aet)	Seacliff
McLachlan	Report	Hooper

Culling Park, Dunedin
Referee: Mr. McCallum
North Island Final
31 August 1924

Auckland Harbour Board	2 – 0	Wellington Marist
Margison ×2	Report

Auckland Domain, Auckland
Referee: Mr. Masters
South Island Final Replay
24 September 1924

Seacliff	4 – 2 (aet)	Sunnyside
W. Simmons, W. Hamlin ×3	Report	H. Gibson ×2

English Park, Christchurch
Referee: Mr. W. Ainsworth

=== Final ===
Teams

Auckland Harbour Board: Jack Batty, W. Mitchell, G.S. Brittain, J. Worthington, R.I. Bell, Dan Jones, J.H. Tocker, Bill Palmer, Herbert.M. Margison, Murray Heyes, C. Drayton

Seacliff: Charlie Rivers, George Anderson, Bill Murray, H. Cox, Alex Waugh, Bill Rogers, Malcolm MacDougall, W. Simmons, Bill Hooper, J. Baillie, Wattie Hanlin

1924 Chatham Cup Final
27 September 1924

Auckland Harbour Board	3 – 1 (aet)	Seacliff
Palmer, Margison ×2	Report	Simmons

Athletic Park, Wellington
Attendance: 2000
Referee: Mr. A. E. Wells
