= 1978 Chatham Cup =

Tournament details
- Venue(s): Trafalgar Park, Nelson
- Dates: 3 September 1978

Final positions
- Champions: Manurewa (2nd title)
- Runners-up: Nelson United

The 1978 Chatham Cup was the 51st annual nationwide knockout football competition in New Zealand.

Early stages of the competition were run in three regions (northern, central, and southern), with the National League teams receiving a bye until the Fourth Round of the competition. In all, 144 teams took part in the competition. Note: Different sources give different numberings for the rounds of the competition: some start round one with the beginning of the regional qualifications; others start numbering from the first national knock-out stage. The former numbering scheme is used in this article.

== Results ==
=== Third round ===
Christchurch Technical	2 – 0	Papanui Suburbs

Dunedin City	7 – 0	Invercargill Thistle

East Coast Bays	5 – 5*	Metro College (Auckland)

Kiwi United (Palmerston North)	2 – 1	Napier City Rovers

Lynndale (Auckland)	1 – 0	Mount Roskill

Manurewa	1 – 0	Takapuna City

Masterton	1 – 0	Viard Old Boys (Porirua)

Mosgiel	1 – 2	Caversham

Moturoa	0 – 3	Taranaki United (New Plymouth)

Nelson Suburbs	0 – 0*	Miramar Rangers

New Brighton	2 – 0	Cashmere Wanderers

Northern Hearts (Timaru)	0 – 1	Christchurch Rangers

Papakura City	1 – 0	Claudelands Rovers

Petone	2 – 1	Christian Youth

Rangiora	2 – 1	Shamrock (Christchurch)

Rotorua City	4 – 1	Rotorua Suburbs

Stokes Valley	1 – 0	Seatoun

Tawa	1 – 1*	Porirua United

Wanganui East Athletic	1 – 0	Manawatu United (Palmerston N.)

Hertz Whangarei City	3 – 1	Eden (Auckland)

* Won on penalties by Metro (3–2), Nelson Suburbs (3–2), and Porirua United (4–2)

=== Fourth round ===
Caversham	3 – 2	Rangiora

Christchurch Rangers	3 – 2	Woolston WMC

Christchurch United	4 – 0	New Brighton

Dunedin City	7 – 0	Christchurch Technical

Kiwi United	1 – 5	Masterton

Lynndale	3 – 2	Hamilton

Metro College	0 – 5	Manurewa

Mount Wellington	1 – 0†	Courier Rangers

North Shore United	1 – 3	Blockhouse Bay

Papakura City	2 – 8	Eastern Suburbs (Auckland)

Porirua United	2 – 1	Stokes Valley

Rotorua City	0 – 1	Hertz Whangarei City

Stop Out (Lower Hutt)	4 – 0	Petone

Taranaki United	0 – 0*	Nelson Suburbs

Wanganui East Athletic	1 – 3	Nelson United

Wellington Diamond United	5 – 0	Waterside (Wellington)

* Won on penalties by Nelson Suburbs (4–3). † Replayed match after Courier Rangers fielded ineligible player

=== Fifth round ===
Christchurch United	4 – 1	Christchurch Rangers

Dunedin City	2 – 1	Caversham

Lynndale	1 – 5	Blockhouse Bay

Manurewa	7 – 0	Hertz Whangarei City

Masterton	1 – 2 (aet)	Stop Out

Mount Wellington	3 – 1	Eastern Suburbs

Nelson Suburbs	0 – 6	Nelson United

Wellington Diamond United	2 – 1	Porirua United

=== Sixth Round ===
Blockhouse Bay	2 – 4	Manurewa

Christchurch United	2 – 1	Stop Out

Dunedin City	2 – 5	Nelson United

Mount Wellington	3 – 1	Wellington Diamond United

=== Semi-finals ===
Christchurch United	1 – 3	Nelson United

Mount Wellington	1 – 2	Manurewa

== The 1978 final ==
The final was held outside one of the main centres for the first time, being played in Nelson. Manurewa won the competition for the first time since 1931, when they had played under the name "Tramurewa" (after a recent merger with Tramways FC). The gap of 47 years between trophies in this competition is still a record.

Manurewa's side was coached by John Adshead who four years later would steer New Zealand's national side to their first FIFA World Cup. The team included several top players, notably Dave Bright and goalkeeper Frank van Hattum; they were opposed by the previous year's champions, Nelson United, a team which boasted the presence of Kenny Cresswell, Peter Simonsen and Keith Mackay, among others.

The game's only goal came after 12 minutes. Nelson keeper Owen Nuttridge failed to completely clear a Dave Bright cross, only for the ball to be headed into the net by Bruce Foster.

=== Final ===
3 September 1978

Manurewa	1 – 0	Nelson United
Foster

Trafalgar Park, Nelson
Referee: R. de Raat
