= 1977 Chatham Cup =

Tournament details
- Venue(s): Newmarket Park, Auckland
- Dates: 10 September 1977

Final positions
- Champions: Nelson United (1st title)
- Runners-up: Mount Wellington

The 1977 Chatham Cup was the 50th annual nationwide knockout football competition in New Zealand.

Early stages of the competition were run in three regions (northern, central, and southern), with the National League teams receiving a bye until the Fourth Round of the competition. In all, 142 teams took part in the competition. Note: Different sources give different numberings for the rounds of the competition: some start round one with the beginning of the regional qualifications; others start numbering from the first national knock-out stage. The former numbering scheme is used in this article.

== The 1977 final ==
Nelson United became the first team from outside the four main urban centres to win the cup since 1962. Their winning team contained several players who were to make a considerable mark on New Zealand soccer, either as players or administrators, among them Kevin Fallon, Kenny Cresswell, Peter Simonsen, and Keith Mackay. Against them was a Mount Wellington side containing the likes of Ron Armstrong, Brian Turner, Tony Sibley, and Earle Thomas.

The final was low-scoring but not without excitement. The only goal came early in the second half when referee John Perkins pointed to the spot after a foul on Nelson's David Powdrell by Stewart Carruthers. The penalty was converted by John Enoka giving Nelson a one-goal lead they never relinquished.

== Results ==
=== Third Round ===
East Coast Bays	2 – 5	Takapuna City

Ellerslie	0 – 2	Pakuranga Town

Gisborne City	4 – 2	Napier City Rovers

Huntly Thistle	3 – 0	Ngaruawahia United

Levin United	1 – 4	Manawatu United (Palmerston N.)

Manurewa	1 – 3	Courier Rangers (Auckland)

Metro College (Auckland)	3 – 6	Mount Roskill

Miramar Rangers	2 – 0	Lower Hutt City

Nelson Suburbs	0 – 1	Richmond Athletic

North End United (Dunedin)	4 – 2	Western (Christchurch)

Northern Hearts (Timaru)	0 – 4	Christchurch Technical

Petone	1 – 1*	Waterside (Wellington)

Queens Park (Invercargill)	0 – 1	Mosgiel

Rotorua City	2 – 0	Rotorua Suburbs

Seatoun	4 – 0	Brooklyn Northern United

Stokes Valley	2 – 0	Masterton

Team Taranaki (New Plymouth)	1 – 1*	Wanganui East Athletic

Wellington WMC	0 – 3	Porirua United

Whangarei City	0 – 2	Glenfield Rovers

Woolston WMC	2 – 1	Rangers (Christchurch)

* Won on penalties by Waterside (4–2) and Wanganui East (3–2)

=== Fourth Round ===
Blockhouse Bay	2 – 5	Hamilton

Christchurch United	1 – 0	Caversham

Courier Rangers	3 – 0	Takapuna City

Dunedin City	3 – 0	New Brighton

Glenfield Rovers	0 – 5	Eastern Suburbs (Auckland)

Huntly Thistle	0 – 1	Mount Roskill

Miramar Rangers	1 – 0	Seatoun

Mosgiel	3 – 4	Christchurch Technical

Pakuranga Town	0 – 2	North Shore United

Porirua United	2 – 4	Waterside

Richmond Athletic	1 – 2	Gisborne City

Rotorua City	0 – 6	Mount Wellington

Stokes Valley	0 – 2	Wellington Diamond United

Stop Out (Lower Hutt)	1 – 0	Manawatu United

Wanganui East Athletic	0 – 7	Nelson United

Woolston WMC	2 – 0	North End United

=== Fifth Round ===
Christchurch United	1 – 1 (aet)*	Christchurch Technical

Courier Rangers	4 – 4 (aet)*	Eastern Suburbs

Gisborne City	1 – 1 (aet)*	Wellington Diamond United

Mount Wellington	11 – 0	Mount Roskill

North Shore United	1 – 1 (aet)*	Hamilton

Stop Out	1 – 1 (aet)*	Nelson United

Waterside	2 – 0	Miramar Rangers

Woolston W.M.C.	1 – 0	Dunedin City

* Won on penalties by Christchurch Technical (14–13), Courier Rangers (5–3), Gisborne (?-?), North Shore (2–1), and Nelson United (5–4)

=== Quarter-finals ===
Gisborne City	1 – 3 (aet)	Christchurch Technical

Mount Wellington	2 – 1	Waterside

Nelson United	3 – 2	Courier Rangers

Woolston W.M.C.	0 – 1	North Shore United

=== Semi-finals ===
Mount Wellington	1 – 0	North Shore United

Nelson United	3 – 1	Christchurch Technical

=== Final ===
10 September 1977

Nelson United	1 – 0	Mount Wellington
Enoka (pen.)

Newmarket Park, Auckland
Referee: John C. Perkins
