= 1929 Chatham Cup =

Tournament details
- Venue(s): Basin Reserve, Wellington
- Dates: 26 August 1929

Final positions
- Champions: Tramways (1st title)
- Runners-up: Seacliff

The 1929 Chatham Cup was the seventh annual nationwide knockout football competition in New Zealand.

The competition was run on a regional basis, with six regional associations (Auckland, Wellington, Poverty Bay, Manawatu, Canterbury, and Otago) each holding separate qualifying rounds.

== Electric Soccer ==
Blandford Park held Auckland's first Chatham Cup match under electric lighting in 1929. The first round fixture between Auckland Thistle and YMCA (Auckland) in extra time, was completed under floodlighting. On 12 June, in a second round fixture, Northcote were scheduled for an evening kick off against Thistle at Blandford Park at 7:30pm, though due to bad weather the match was rescheduled to take place on 19 June, and again was postponed due to the weather.

On 26 June the match was again postponed due to the state of Blandford Park. Finally on the evening of 3 July the match took place, with Thistle defeating Northcote 3–2.

After the succession of postponements the Auckland FA petitioned the NZ council for an extension to their qualification scheduling. After being given the date of the 27th of July for the North Auckland FA decider, the Auckland FA then put the question to the remaining five clubs who decided through committee that Tramways should be awarded the position of Auckland contender.

== Teams ==
=== Otago ===
Seacliff

=== Canterbury ===
Christchurch Thistle, Nomads, Rangers, Western, St. Albans, New Brighton A.F.C.

=== Wellington ===
Hospital, Institute Old Boys'

=== Manawatu ===
St Andrew's, Palmerston North Returned Services Association (R.S.A.)

=== Poverty Bay ===
Gisborne Thistle

=== Auckland ===
Auckland F.A: Tramways, YMCA (Auckland), Celtic (Auckland), Auckland Thistle, Ponsonby, Onehunga, Bon Accord, Auckland Corinthians, Manurewa, Belmont, Rangers (Auckland)

South Auckland F.A: Huntly Thistle (withdrew)

North Auckland F.A: Waro Wanderers (withdrew)

== The 1929 final ==
Seacliff's George Anderson, Bill Rogers, Bill Murray, and Bill Hooper were each playing in their fourth final, at that time record. Unfortunately for them, Tramways totally dominated the final. The only goal of the first half came from Clem Bell, though Seacliff came close to equalising before the break. In the second half, though, Seacliff were outclassed. Early on in the half Seacliff keeper T. Jackson managed to get a hand to a shot from F. Lewis but was unable to keep the ball for entering the goal (some sources name Evan Williams was the scorer of this goal). Harry Spencer added two more goals for the Aucklanders, but there was controversy when no penalty was awarded for a clear handball by a defender in front of the Tramways goal late in the match.

== Results ==
=== Auckland Qualifiers ===
8 June 1929

Auckland Thistle	5-3 (a.e.t.) Final quarter of match played under floodlights	YMCA (Auckland)
Kay ×2, Chalmers, Webb, Hislop	Report	Humphries ×2, McAuslan

Blandford Park, Auckland
Referee: Mr. L.C.H. Dawson
8 June 1929

Celtic (Auckland)	3-1	Ponsonby
Rimmer, Watt ×2	Report	Ward

Blandford Park, Auckland
Referee: Mr. A. Parkinson
8 June 1929

Onehunga	0-1	Bon Accord
	Report	Nicol

Auckland Domain, Auckland
Referee: Mr. R. H. Parfitt
8 June 1929

Corinthians	2-7	Tramways
Jones, Ahern	Report	Christie, Williams ×2, Bell, Spencer, Simpson, Spong

Victoria Park, Auckland
Referee: Mr. J. Campbell
8 June 1929

Belmont	0-1	Manurewa
	Report	Williamson

Devonport, Auckland
Referee: Mr. A. Bowie
8 June 1929

Rangers (Auckland)	1-3	Northcote
	Report

Onehunga, Auckland
Referee: Mr. G. Shand
3 July 1929

Northcote	2 - 3 First ever floodlit match in New Zealand	Auckland Thistle
Pugh ×2	Report	Kay ×2, Rowat

Blandford Park, Auckland
Referee: Mr. A. J. Galley
11 July 1929

Celtic (Auckland)	Postponed Floodlit night match	Manurewa

Blandford Park, Auckland

=== North Auckland/Auckland Qualifier ===
27 July 1929

Tramways	w/o Tramways won by default	Waro Wanderers
	Report

=== Poverty Bay/South Auckland (Waikato) Qualifier ===
27 July 1929

Gisborne Thistle	w/o Gisborne Thistle won by default	Huntly Thistle
	Report

=== Canterbury Qualifiers ===
20 July 1929
Canterbury Semi-final

Christchurch Rangers	1 - 4 aet	Western
Sloan	Report	Brigdens, Evans, Barwell ×2

English Park, Christchurch
Referee: Mr. Campbell
20 July 1929
Canterbury Semi-final

Christchurch Thistle	3 - 0	St. Albans
Trotter, G. Walker ×2	Report

Spreydon Park, Christchurch
Referee: Mr. M. Wilson

=== Wellington Qualifiers ===
22 June 1929

Institute Old Boys	2 - 1	Hospital
May ×2	Report

Basin Reserve, Wellington
13 July 1929
Wellington Semi-Final

Wellington Marist	3 - 4	Institute Old Boys
Marshment, Bird, Marshall	Report	Bilby, Maddocks, May, Smith

Basin Reserve, Wellington
Referee: Mr. G. Jackson
13 July 1929
Wellington Semi-Final

Petone	v Match abandoned after 30 minutes	Wellington YMCA
	Report

Petone Recreation Ground, Wellington
Referee: Mr. R. Ball
Replay
27 July 1929
Wellington Semi-Final

Petone	1 - 2	Wellington YMCA
Campbell	Report	McLeod ×2

Association Park, Wellington
Referee: Mr. F. Sanders

=== Manawatu Qualifiers ===
13 July 1929
Manawatu Final

St. Andrews	5 - 0	Palmerston North Returned Services Association
McKenzie ×3, Lyons, Beecham,	Report

North Street Park, Palmerston North
Referee: Mr. F. W. Ivey
Replay
20 July 1929
Manawatu Final

St. Andrews	10 - 2	Palmerston North Returned Services Association
McKenzie ×4, Lyons, Corkindale ×4, Beecham	Report	Baigent 2 x pen.

North Street Park, Palmerston North
Referee: Mr. H. W. Johnson

=== Quarter-finals ===
27 July 1929
Canterbury Final

Christchurch Thistle	4 – 1	Western
Trotter ×3, Walker	report	Evans

English Park, Christchurch
10 August 1929
Wellington/Manawatu Final

Wellington YMCA	4 – 2	St. Andrews
Worth, Rigby, McLeod ×2	Report	McSheffery, Corkindale (pen.)

Basin Reserve, Wellington
Referee: Mr. F. Sanders
10 August 1929
Auckland/Poverty Bay Final

Tramways	8 – 2	Gisborne Thistle
Spencer ×3, Bell ×3, Williams, Stretton	report	Watt ×2

Victoria Park, Auckland

=== Semi-finals ("Island finals") ===
North Island Final
17 August 1929

Tramways	2 - 1	Wellington YMCA
Spencer 2 (1 x pen.) Stretton (red card)	Report	McLeod

Blandford Park, Auckland
Referee: Mr. E. Parkinson
South Island Final
17 August 1929

Christchurch Thistle	0 – 1 aet	Seacliff
	Report	Hooper

English Park, Christchurch
Attendance: 1000
Referee: Mr. J. Stout

=== Final ===
Teams

Tramways: Jack Batty, J. McElligott, Ernie Simpson, Jack Tinkler, Jim Christie, Joe Fyvie, A. Spong, Clem Bell, Harry Spencer, Evan Williams, F. Lewis.

Seacliff: T. Jackson, George Anderson, Bill Rogers, Bill Murray, Hugh Munsie, A. Maxwell, J. McLaughlan, W. Simmons, Bill Hooper, Tom McCormack, Rab McLean.

1929 Chatham Cup Final
26 August 1929

Tramways	4 – 0	Seacliff
Spencer ×2, Bell, Lewis	report

Basin Reserve, Wellington
Referee: D. Stirratt
