= McGirr =

McGirr, recorded as McGerr, McGirr, McGeer, and likely others, is an early Scottish and Irish surname. It derives from the pre-10th century Gaelic 'Mac an gHeairr' which is believed to translate as 'the son of the short man’ or ‘sharp of wit’.

It is certain that almost all Gaelic surnames, whether Scottish or Irish, and that are not locational, derive from a nickname for the first nameholder or chief. Some of these original names were robust at best and often obscene for modern tastes, so, therefore, the meaning has been largely toned down over the years. That is not the case here, and referred to the physical size of the chief, at a time when generally people were small in stature in any case. Like many nicknames, the reverse applied, and the chief was actually tall.

The first known recordings of the surname are in Ireland in 1602. No individuals are mentioned except only that the nameholders in County Armagh are called MacEghir. Later in 1628 the name-holders are mentioned as being 'numerous in County Armagh'. The first known recording of an individual is that of Mobert M'Girre of Dalbeattie, Scotland in 1658, whilst Shane MacGirr of Fintona in Northern Ireland was a Jacobite who was outlawed after the battle of the Boyne in 1690. He is believed to have joined the Irish armies of the king of France. Elizabeth McGerr was a famine emigrant who left Ireland on the ship "Garrick of Liverpool" on May 15, 1847, bound for New York.

== Dispersions and variations ==
It may be derived from an epithet or may be a calque or phono-semantic match to the Irish word gearr which translates as short. According to the Irish Times Households in the 19th century database, 'Gear' as a surname was found to be exclusive to Cork, Kerry, Limerick, Kilkenny and Offaly with the majority in Kerry. However, 70% of McGirr households in the 19th century were found in Tyrone and almost exclusively in Ulster. The name McGirr is most common in Tyrone and is associated with the Cenél Fearadhaigh of Clogher barony.

The Annals of Ulster states that Cu-Uladh (The hound of Ulster) McGhirr-McCawell (MacCathmhaoil), 'chieftain of his own tribe', was an illustrious professor of science in England in 1368. In the aftermath of the Great Famine with the mass emigration of Irish it was very common for Irish to conceal their roots to avoid discrimination and names were commonly changed, i.e. O'Donnell to Dodds. There are Shorts listed in Kirkcudbrightshire east Scotland with a few people called McGirr, however, the McGirr name is far more prominent in Ireland than in Scotland. The Ulster Annals show Cu-Uladh McGhirr-McCawell (MacCathmhaoil) was perhaps too well established to be among the gallóglaigh. Edward Shortt, the son of a vicar who served as British Home secretary in the 1920s, has family roots that originate from County Tyrone.

Feradach, of the Cenél Fearadhaigh, was the son of Muiredach and great-grandson of Niall, whose descendants included the MacCawells (MacCathmhaoil), as well as the Irish Campbells in the Clogher area. MacGilmartin were chiefs in the barony of Clogher, and one was chief of Cenel Fearadaigh in 1166.

In 1365 when Malachy of the Mac Cathmhaoil, the ruling house of Clogher, slew an O'Neill of Tír Eoghain, Malachy was known as 'Maelechainn mac in ghirr meic Mac Cathmhaoil'. Translated, this is Malachy the son of the short-fellow Mac Cathmhaoil. This feat of slaying an O’Neill warranted a change of name so he became Malachy mac in ghirr or simply Malachy MacGirr. Later this family survived the Ulster Plantation, receiving a number of grants of lands at the time. They are to be found later in the 1660s as taxpayers in the Clogher Valley and elsewhere in Tyrone. Today the family is generally found as McGirr, McGerr, McKerr and in the anglicized version as Short.

== Individuals with the name McGirr ==
- Eamonn McGirr (1940–2004), Irish-born entertainer in New York's Capital District area
- Edmund McGirr, one of the pseudonyms of writer Kenneth Giles
- Edward McCombie McGirr (1916–2003), Scottish professor of medicine
- Ernest McGirr, Q.C. (1887–1982), politician in Manitoba, Canada
- Fritz McGirr, musician with Scythian (band)
- Greg McGirr (1879–1949), Australian politician, New South Wales MLA
- Herb McGirr (1891–1964), New Zealand cricketer who played in two Tests in 1930
- Jim McGirr (1890–1957), Labor Premier of New South Wales 1947–1952
- James McGirr Kelly (1928–2005), US federal judge
- Joe McGirr (born 1960), Australian politician
- Les McGirr (1897– ?), (soccer) footballer played for New Zealand
- Patrick McGirr (1874–1957), Australian politician
- Seán McGirr (born 1987), Irish fashion designer, creative director at Alexander McQueen from 2023 to October 2024
- William McGirr (1857–1934), New Zealand cricketer

== See also ==
- McGirr, Illinois
