= Harry Spencer (footballer) =

English-born New Zealand footballer

Henry Spencer
Personal information
- Full name: Henry George "Harry" Spencer
- Date of birth: 1897
- Place of birth: Southampton, England
- Date of death: 1942 (aged 44)
- Place of death: New Zealand
- Position: Forward

Senior career*
Years	Team	Apps	(Gls)
1921	Everton	9	(2)
1922–24	Wigan Borough	35	(7)
- Tramways
- Tramurewa

International career
1927	New Zealand	2	(1)
- * Club domestic league appearances and goals

Henry George Spencer, known as Harry Spencer (1897–1942) was a football player who represented New Zealand at the international level.

Spencer was born in England at Southampton, Hampshire. Before emigrating to New Zealand he had played football with Everton and Wigan Borough, both in Lancashire.

Spencer was part of Tramways Chatham Cup winning team, helping the club gain their first title in 1929. Spencer would scored two goals in their 4–0 win in the final against Otago's Seacliff AFC. Spencer would win the cup again in 1931, playing for Tramurewa, which was a recent merger of Tramways with another club called Manurewa.

Spencer played two official A-international matches for the All Whites in 1927, both against a touring Canadian side. The first was a 2–2 draw on 25 June 1927 and the second was a 1–2 loss on 2 July, with Spencer scoring New Zealand's goal.
