= Karori Lunatic Asylum =

Psychiatric hospital in New Zealand, 1854 to 1873

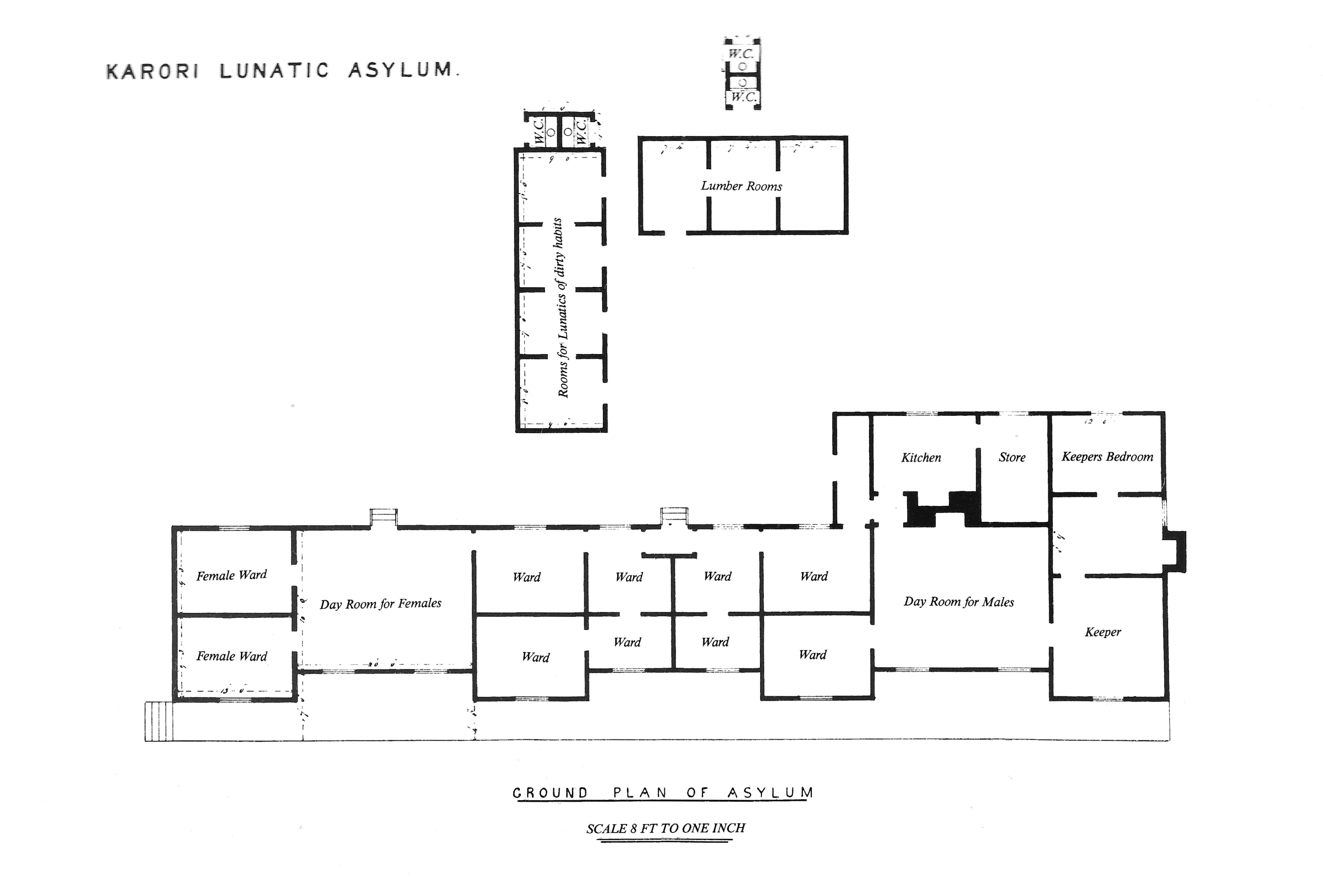
- Ground plan of Karori Lunatic Asylum in 1865

Geography
- Location: Karori, Wellington, New Zealand
- Coordinates: 41°17′03″S 174°44′31″E

Organisation
- Care system: Public
- Type: Specialist

Services
- Beds: 1–27
- Speciality: Psychiatric

History
- Opened: 1 January 1854
- Closed: 20 May 1873

Links
- Lists: Hospitals in New Zealand

Karori Lunatic Asylum was Wellington Province's lunatic asylum between 1854 and 1873. It was the first asylum in New Zealand and offered state care for people with mental disorders or cognitive impairments. At that time Karori was a rural village isolated from Wellington city by a poor road.

Karori asylum opened in January 1854 with one male patient and one male member of staff, the keeper (or master). It was based in an existing house on a 5-acre (2.0 ha) section. Patients had a daily routine and were kept active with work and exercise. The staff were laypeople. In 1857 the first female patient was admitted. A visiting medical officer was also appointed to tend the physical health of patients and supervise the asylum. The first married couple were appointed as keeper and matron in 1858.

From the mid-1860s the number of patients at Karori asylum grew more quickly than the accommodation for them. It became increasingly overcrowded and understaffed, particularly on the women's wing. By 1867 official visitors were raising concerns about conditions at the asylum. In 1871 a committee of the colonial parliament demanded improvements. The provincial council decided to replace Karori with a purpose-built asylum in Wellington city. Construction of Mount View Lunatic Asylum began in 1872. It was designed to accommodate twice the number of patients then at Karori asylum.

In May 1872 a provincial inquiry found a history of patients being ill-treated at Karori asylum. The keeper and matron were replaced and the medical officer's supervision was criticised. Karori Lunatic Asylum closed in May 1873 after its 27 patients were moved to Mount View.

== History ==
=== Before asylums (pre-1854) ===
Prior to 1854 the Colony of New Zealand imprisoned lunatics to keep the peace. The first step toward asylums was separating lunatics from other prisoners. Accommodation for lunatics was added to prisons in Wellington then Auckland in 1844. Lunacy was typically caused by heredity or head injuries.

In response to public demand for more humane treatment of lunatics the colonial parliament passed the Lunatic Ordinance 1846 which created legal processes around lunacy and anticipated asylums. An individual could be certified as a lunatic by two medical doctors at the request of two justices of the peace. Doctors and justices could also certify that a lunatic had recovered. A lunatic could be admitted to an asylum if they were not believed to be a danger to the public. They would remain until they recovered and were discharged, they were collected by family or friends who agreed to care for them, or they died. If a lunatic could not pay for their care then the cost would be covered by the state.

Staff in the first asylums were not medically trained. They were expected to follow the principles of moral management and non-restraint. Moral management kept patients active with a routine of physical work or exercise, recreations and religious services. Non-restraint confined violent or destructive patients to padded cells instead of physically restraining them.

=== Opening and early years (1854–1856) ===
Karori Lunatic Asylum opened on 1 January 1854 with one male patient and a male keeper. It was based in an existing large cottage on a 5-acre (2.0 ha) section. (Note: Williams (1987) suggests Karori Lunatic Asylum probably opened in an existing house. By 1990 Williams had confirmed this.) The section had Karori Road and Donald Street along its northern and eastern edges. It was 3–4 miles (4.8–6.4 km) from Wellington city on a poor road.

In 1856 a wing was added to Karori asylum. According to Williams (1987), a history of psychiatric hospitals in the Wellington Region, there were few sources about the asylum in this period.

=== An effective service (1857–1864) ===
In February 1857 a parliamentary select committee reported concerns about Karori asylum. "There was a feeling of isolation, neglect and decay." according to Williams (1987). The committee recommended appointing a visiting medical officer to supervise the asylum. Doctor Knox was appointed as medical officer in July, while the first female patient had been admitted in June.

In 1858 William and Elizabeth Sutherland were appointed as keeper and matron. They remained until May 1872. In 1861 doctor Alexander Johnston was succeeded by doctor Charles France as medical officer. France visited the asylum twice a week until it closed in May 1873.

Johnston and France's 1861 and 1862 status reports gave details of day-to-day life at the asylum. There were eight wards and 10 patients: six women and four men. And there were three staff: the keeper, the matron and a male attendant (or assistant). (Note: The attendant was male because the female attendant arrived in 1871.) The male patients tended a 0.5-acre (0.20 ha) kitchen garden, which made the asylum self-sufficient in vegetables, and they prepared firewood. The female patients sewed and cleaned clothes. Patients were usually allowed out around the section, which also had a 0.5-acre (0.20 ha) flower garden, but they were not offered recreations or religious services. They could be physically restrained in a straitjacket. They could also be punished with confinement. According to Williams (1987), the status reports "... suggested that [Karori] asylum was running an effective service for the mentally ill."

In 1863 a contract to add another wing to the asylum was awarded.

A particularly comprehensive inspection report of 1871 contained annual changes in the number of patients since the early 1860s. Between 1862 and 1864 11 patients were admitted, six were discharged and three died. By the end of 1864 the number of patients at Karori asylum had grown to 12.

=== Overcrowding and replacement (1865 – May 1873) ===
By the end of this period, Karori had been joined by lunatic asylums in Dunedin, Christchurch, Auckland and Hokitika. The Lunatics Act 1868 included a requirement for regular independent inspections of the colony's asylums.

==== Rapid growth in the number of patients ====
In his 1871 report Wellington Province's inspector Thomas Adolphus Bowden wrote "The number of patients [at Karori asylum] has increased rapidly during the last five years: viz., from 12 in 1865 to 20 in 1870 ...". The growth continued and by the time the asylum closed in May 1873 it had 27 patients. According to medical officer Charles France, a major problem at Karori asylum was a patient could only leave if they were curable and they had recovered. The patients did not have family or friends who would collect and agree to care for them and they were paupers, who were unable to pay for care elsewhere. In 1873 France wrote the majority of patients were incurable and had been at the asylum for several years. Incurable patients would remain in state care for life.

The number of patients at Karori asylum grew more quickly than the resources to accommodate and care for them. Status and inspection reports always covered the number of patients but few covered the asylum's resources.

In April 1865 there were 10 wards and four cells for 12–15 patients. By September 1871 three wards had been added but the number of patients had grown to 24, according to the last known report covering patient accommodation. (Note: The last known source for building work at Karori Lunatic Asylum was a call for tenders in 1867.) France and keeper William Sutherland agreed the asylum had become overcrowded.

In May 1862 Karori asylum had 10 patients and three staff: the keeper, the matron and a male attendant. By April 1867 France and the official visitors noted the attendant was spending most of his time cooking and cleaning so the keeper and matron were continually on duty for 19 patients: 12 women and 7 men. France and Bowden gave examples of understaffing to justify appointing more attendants. A second male attendant had arrived by August 1870, while a female attendant arrived in October 1871. The asylum still had these five staff roles in September 1872, according to the last known inspection report.

==== Towards replacement ====
The first known suggestion that Karori Lunatic Asylum should be replaced was made by provincial inspector Thomas Adolphus Bowden in August 1870. In his January 1871 report Bowden proposed a new asylum that could accommodate more patients and was closer to Wellington city to ease inspections and deliveries of perishable food.

In mid-1871 doctor Andrew Buchanan, the chairman of the parliamentary committee on lunatic asylums, made an inspection of Karori. He recommended it should be replaced following Bowden's proposal. Later that year the committee published an improvement plan for the colony's asylums which singled Karori out for urgent attention.

In 1872 Wellington Province started to build Mount View Lunatic Asylum on a site overlooking the city. It was designed to accommodate 50 patients, twice the number then at Karori. The site, above Adelaide Road in Newtown, is now occupied by Government House.

==== Ill-treatment of patients ====
In April 1872 female attendant Mary McDonald, who arrived late the previous year, alleged ill-treatment of patients by the matron. Wellington Province launched an inquiry which heard conflicting evidence over four days. Matron Elizabeth Sutherland admitted occasionally hitting female patients, while keeper William Sutherland said McDonald wanted to discredit the matron and take her role. Two former staff members then alleged ill-treatment by the matron and the keeper had been ongoing since the late 1860s.

In May 1872 the inquiry reported "... that the patients have been treated with unnecessary violence, ...". Medical officer Charles France was criticised for not noticing the ill-treatment and told he needed to supervise the asylum more rigorously. The Sutherlands were dismissed then tried and convicted of ill-treating lunatics. (Note: Williams (1987) covers the provincial inquiry into alleged ill-treatment of patients at Karori Lunatic Asylum. However, it does not list witnesses heard on the third and fourth days, including two former staff members. Williams (1987) also says the keeper and matron William and Elizabeth Sutherland resigned. It does not cover their trial where it emerged that they had been dismissed.)

==== Final year and closure ====
In May 1872 Henry and Charlotte Seager replaced the Sutherlands as keeper and matron of Karori Lunatic Asylum. Henry had worked at Sunnyside Lunatic Asylum, Christchurch under his brother Edward who was widely regarded as one of the colony's most progressive and effective lay keepers. However, female attendant Mary McDonald and a male attendant, both of whom had given evidence against the former matron and keeper at the provincial inquiry, would not accept the authority of the Seagers. They were both dismissed by Henry Seager in August 1872.

By the time the Seagers were appointed work and exercise for patients had dwindled. But by April 1873, according to Henry Seager, the patients had been made more active with additional work: the men did landscaping, while the women produced clothes and cleaned the asylum. Recreations and religious services, the other moral management activities, were also offered to patients at Karori asylum for the first time. Patients attended musical events and visited Eden Vale nursery and tea garden, which was further along Donald Street. While Anglican patients attended services at St Mary's Church, across Karori Road.

Karori asylum had 27 patients by 1873. According to Williams (1990), they were all Europeans: 26 from the British Isles with one from Prussia. A few newspaper reports from the mid to late 1860s mentioned Māori patients at the asylum. The most detailed of these said a male and a female patient were waiting to be collected by their friends.

On 20 May 1873 Karori Lunatic Asylum closed after its patients were moved to Mount View. At the new asylum Charles France continued as medical officer, while the Seagers continued as keeper and matron.

The former Karori asylum section was bought by Wellington Province's Board of Education. Karori School moved to the section in 1875. Renamed Karori Normal School in 1968 it is still there today.

=== Legacy ===
According to Williams (1987), the shortcomings of Karori Lunatic Asylum were blamed on its lay leadership rather than its inadequate resources or isolated location. Members of parliament used these shortcomings to justify replacing lay leaders with medical doctors.
