= McGerr =

McGerr is a surname. Notable people with the surname include:

- Jason McGerr (born 1974), American musician
- Michael McGerr (fl. 2000s–2010s), American academic and historian
- Patricia McGerr (1917–1985), American crime writer

== See also ==
- McGirr
