= Thomas Bowden =

Thomas Bowden may refer to:

- Thomas Adolphus Bowden (1824–1906), English-born New Zealand Anglican clergyman, farmer, teacher and educationalist
- Thomas Russell Bowden (1841–1893), Attorney General of the Restored Government of Virginia
