= George Anderson (New Zealand footballer) =

Scottish-born New Zealand footballer

Personal information
- Full name: George Anderson
- Date of birth: 31 March 1896
- Place of birth: Loanhead, Scotland
- Date of death: 23 January 1978 (aged 81)
- Place of death: Dunedin
- Position: Defender

Senior career*
Years	Team	Apps	(Gls)
1923–29	Seacliff		

International career
1927	New Zealand	4	(0)
- * Club domestic league appearances and goals

George Anderson was a former association football player who represented New Zealand at international level.

Anderson made four appearances for the All Whites, all against the touring Canadians. His first match ended in a 2–2 draw on 25 June 1927, followed by a 1–2 loss, a 1–0 win and his final match a 1–4 loss on 23 July 1927

Anderson was one of the first players to appear in four Chatham Cup finals. he and three team-mates achieved the feat in the 1929 Chatham Cup final, Seacliff having already appeared in the finals in 1923, 1924, and 1925.

== Honours ==
Seacliff

- Chatham Cup: 1923; runner-up 1924, 1925, 1929
