= Esther Seager =

New Zealand prison and asylum matron (1835–1911)

Esther Seager (1835 – 16 March 1911) was a notable New Zealand prison matron and asylum matron. She was born in Charfield, Gloucestershire, England in about 1835.

Esther's husband Edward Seager was superintendent of the Lyttelton Gaol, and Esther the matron. In 1863 the two were appointed to Sunnyside Lunatic Asylum, where they remained until their retirement in 1887.

Esther died on the 16 March 1911 at the residence of her son-in-law FC Hawley in Christchurch.
