= 1923 Chatham Cup =

Tournament details
- Venue(s): Athletic Park, Wellington
- Dates: 22 September – 1 October 1923

Final positions
- Champions: Seacliff (1st title)
- Runners-up: Wellington Y.M.C.A.

The 1923 Chatham Cup was the first annual nationwide football competition in New Zealand.

The competition was run on a regional basis, with separate northern and southern tournaments, with the winners of the two meeting in the final. Very few teams entered the competition, including only two from the southern South Island; Seacliff easily won the only match played there, thumping Oamaru 7–0, and repeated this in the final, accounting for Wellington's YMCA 4–0.

Of the teams taking part, it is known that four were from Wellington; contemporary reports indicate that Diamonds, Y.M.C.A. (Wellington), Hospital and Waterside took part. The Wellington FA scheduled their first Chatham Cup fixture for 11 August, between the Y.M.C.A. (Wellington) and Waterside at the Basin Reserve. Admission to the match cost one shilling.

The management committee of the Auckland Football Association (A.F.A.) announced at its meeting on 5 June that Chatham Cup entries had closed with the North Shore, Philomel, Harbour Board, Brotherhood, Auckland Thistle, Northcote and Ponsonby clubs entering. Meeting again on 12 June, the A.F.A. decided the second round of fixtures for the Auckland League Championship would count toward Chatham Cup qualification, with League Championship second round commencing on 16 June. Y.M.C.A. (Auckland) was admitted to compete for the Chatham Cup by the A.F.A. at its management committee meeting on 19 June.

Huntly qualified as the South Auckland Football Association representative as local league champions and were scheduled to face the Auckland Football Association qualifier, Northcote at Huntly.

The Wairarapa Football Association clubs, Waingawa, Post and Telegraph, Masterton and Y.M.C.A. (Masterton) sent entrance fees to join the 1923 Chatham Cup, which were received by the N.Z.F.A. in early June. The first two Chatham Cup fixtures held by the Wairarapa FA took place on June 30, with Post and Telegraph (P & T) versus the Masterton Y.M.C.A. at Masterton's Park Oval, and Waingawa playing Masterton at the Cole Street Ground.

The Dawbers' Motor Depot. side changed its name to Athletic (Palmerston North) in 1925.

There is some confusion about the earlier rounds of the competition, with various Charity Cups being held to decide entrants to the Chatham Cup, and with regional qualification finals, island finals, and the national final all simply being referred to in contemporary reports as "finals". Compounding this, different regional football associations were allowed to choose their champion team by whatever method they liked, meaning that some regions (such as Auckland) used league position to determine their entrant for the inter-regional matches, rather than a knockout competition. Compounding matters further are the incomplete records held by the NZFA, which omit several matches (including the semi-final between Seacliff and Oamaru Rangers).

== The 1923 final ==
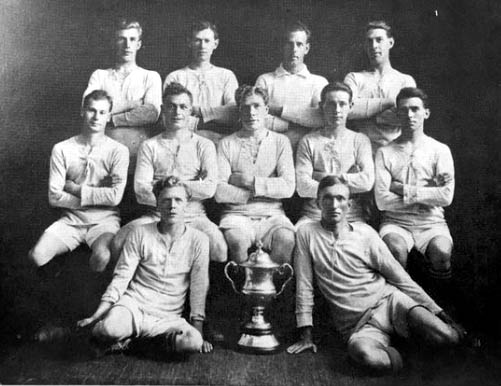
Seacliff AFC winners of the first Chatham Cup final

Played at Athletic Park, Wellington on 1 October 1923, Seacliff met YMCA Wellington in the first Chatham Cup final. In the final, YMCA had the better of early possession, but Seacliff gained the upper hand as the match progressed. Centre-forward Bill Hooper scored the first goal just before the half-time interval. Shortly after the break Reg Baxter doubled the lead. Late on right wing Malcolm McDougall scored again, followed only a minute later by a second from Hooper. The line-up of the first Chatham Cup winning side was as follows: Charlie Rivers, Jock Anderson, George Anderson, Bill Rogers, Hugh McKechnie, Bill Murray, Malcolm McDougall, Reg Baxter, Bill Hooper, R. "Tommy" Burns, Wattie Hanlin.

The Mayor of Wellington, Robert Wright presented the cup to Seacliff on the ground after the match.

== Participants ==
Auckland

- Auckland Harbour Board
- Auckland Thistle
- Auckland YMCA
- Northcote
- North Shore
- Ponsonby
- HMS Philomel

South Auckland (Waikato)

- Huntly

Manawatu

- Dawbers' Motor Depot. (Foxton)
- Palmerston North Rangers
- St. Andrews

Wellington

- Diamond
- Hospital
- Waterside
- Wellington YMCA

Wairarapa

- Post and Telegraph
- Masterton YMCA
- Masterton
- Waingawa

Nelson

- Redwood Valley
- Nelson Athletic
- Nelson Wanderers
- Nelson Thistle

North Otago

- Oamaru Rangers

Otago

- Seacliff

== Results ==
=== Auckland Qualifiers ===
Northcote won Auckland's Division One league second round and thus qualified as Auckland's Chatham Cup representative.

South Auckland/Auckland Final
15 September 1923

Huntly	3 – 1	Northcote
Cox ×2, Baber	Report	Knott

Huntly Recreation Ground, Waikato
Attendance: 500
Referee: Mr. A. F. Newbold

=== Wairarapa Qualifiers ===
30 June 1923

Post and Telegraph	10 - 2	YMCA (Masterton)
Stacey ×4, Watson ×3, R. Miller, W. Harding, Harris	Report	Moore, McLauchlan

Park Oval, Masterton
Referee: Mr. R. Taylor
30 June 1923

Waingawa	3 - 2	Masterton
	Report

Cole Street Ground, Masterton
Referee: Mr. Rowlands
Wairarapa Final
21 July 1923

Waingawa	3 - 1	Post and Telegraph
Kilmister, Birkett, (Nicholls og.)	Report	Watson

Park Oval, Masterton
Referee: Mr. T. Hallam

=== Manawatu Qualifiers ===
1 July 1923

Dawbers	2 - 2	St. Andrew's
Hearsey, ?	Report	Kennedy ×2

Showground, Foxton
Referee: Mr. Crouch
7 July 1923

Dawbers	2 - 1 Replay	St. Andrew's
Hearsey (pen.), C. Dawber	Report	McLauchlan

Showground, Foxton
Referee: Rev. C. W. Duncumb
14 July 1923

Palmerston North Rangers	0 - 3	Dawbers
	Report	Davis, C. Dawber, Hearsey

North Street Park, Palmerston North
Referee: Mr. Forbes
Wairarapa/Manawatu Final
25 August 1923

Waingawa	0 - 6	Dawbers
	Report	Hearsey ×4, Davis, Chapman,

Park Oval, Masterton
Referee: Mr. Halam

=== Wellington Qualifiers ===
11 August 1923

Waterside	2 - 2	Wellington YMCA
Gilbertson, Anton	Report	Hindmarsh, Ballard

Basin Reserve, Wellington
Referee: Mr. G. Akers
25 August 1923

Wellington YMCA	2 - 1 Replay	Waterside
Hindmarsh, Campbell (pen.)	Report	Stacey

Association Park, Wellington
Referee: Mr. F. Campbell
25 August 1923

Diamond	0 - 1	Hospital
	Report	Hughes

Association Park, Wellington
Referee: Mr. S. Wilson
Wellington Final
8 September 1923

Hospital	1 - 2 aet	Wellington YMCA
Hughes	Report	McGirr (pen.), Ballard

Basin Reserve, Wellington
Referee: Mr. W. Bryce

=== Nelson Qualifiers ===
16 June 1923

Nelson Athletic	2 - 6	Nelson Wanderers
W. Richards, ?	Report	Wheeler ×4, Symons, Hurst jnr.

Victory Square No.1, Nelson
Referee: Mr. Hunt
16 June 1923

Redwood Valley	1 - 0	Nelson Thistle
D. Brown	Report

Victory Square No.2, Nelson
Referee: Mr. Parker
Nelson Final
23 June 1923

Nelson Wanderers	3 - 2	Redwood Valley
Yorgensen, Wheeler ×2	Report	D. Brown, A. Brown

Victory Square No.1, Nelson
Referee: Mr. Parkinson
Nelson/Wellington Final
15 September 1923

Nelson Wanderers	1 - 8	Wellington YMCA
Symons	Report	Phillips, Ballard ×3, Trott ×2, ? , ?

Trafalgar Park, Nelson
Referee: Mr. C. Parkinson
Wellington/Manawatu Final
22 September 1923

Wellington YMCA	3 – 2	Dawbers
Phillips, McGirr (pen.), Ballard	Report	Davis, Chapman

Association Park, Kilbirnie, Wellington
Referee: Mr. W.G. Bryce

=== Semi-final (Island Finals) ===
South Island Final
25 August 1923

Oamaru Rangers	0 – 7	Seacliff
	Report	Hooper ×6, Burns

Oamaru
Referee: Mr. Rutherford
North Island Final
29 September 1923

Wellington YMCA	2 – 0	Huntly
Campbell ×2	Report

Athletic Park, Wellington
Referee: Mr. F. Campbell

=== Final ===
Teams

Seacliff: Charlie Rivers, George Anderson, Jock Anderson, Bill Rogers, Hugh McKechnie, Bill Murray, Malcolm Macdougall, Reg Baxter, Bill Hooper, Tommy Burns, Wattie Hanlin

Wellington YMCA: Arthur Tarrant, W. Pearson, Les McGirr, George Wotherspoon, Bill Rarity, Charlie Trott, Les Smith, Edgar Phillips, George Campbell, Harry Hindmarsh, Charles Ballard

1 October 1923

Seacliff	4 – 0	Wellington YMCA
Hooper ×2, Baxter, Macdougall	Report

Athletic Park, Wellington
Referee: Mr. J.A. Leddy
