= 1931 Chatham Cup =

Tournament details
- City: Wellington
- Venue: Basin Reserve
- Dates: 12 September 1931
- Teams: 31

Final positions
- Champions: Tramurewa (1st title)
- Runners-up: Nomads

The 1931 Chatham Cup was the ninth annual nationwide knockout football competition in New Zealand.

The competition was run on a regional basis, with six regional associations (Auckland, Walkato, Wellington, Manawatu, Canterbury, and Otago) each holding separate qualifying rounds. In all, 30 teams took part in the competition, though some reports suggest there may have been 31 teams, and for the first time the majority came from the South Island. This was an improvements over previous years, but still a tiny number considering that 514 teams were affiliated to the regional associations nationwide. Participation by Auckland teams was particularly poor, with only three sides from that city taking part.

== Participants ==
The following 31 teams are known to have taken part in the competition:

Auckland

- Ponsonby
- Auckland YMCA
- Tramurewa

South Auckland (Waikato)

- Renown
- Rotowaro
- Huntly Thistle

Wanganui

- Wanganui East Athletic

Manawatu

- St. Andrew's (Palmerston North)

Wellington

- Diamond
- Hospital
- Petone
- Seatoun
- Waterside
- Wellington Marist

Westland

- Cobden
- Dobson
- Greymouth
- Rewanui
- Taylorville

Canterbury

- Christchurch Rangers
- Christchurch Thistle
- New Brighton
- Nomads
- Saint Albans
- Technical Old Boys
- Western

Otago

- Maori Hill
- Mosgiel
- Northern
- Port Chalmers
- Seacliff

== The 1931 final ==
The final was won by Tramurewa, a recent amalgamation of former winners Tramways and Manurewa, soon to be renamed Manurewa AFC. In all, six of Tramurewa's player had played for Tramways in the 1929 final. In the final almost all of the action occurred in the second half. A. Wilson was the first scorer for Nomads, followed two minutes later by G. Goode. Clem Bell then scored twice to leave the scores tied at 2–2. Nomads defended stoutly to keep the scores tied until full-time, but in the first period of extra time both H., Donaldson and Arthur Spong scored for the Auckland team. The goal tally was completed just before the end of the second period of extra time by Bell's third goal.

Tramurewa's Clem Bell was the second player in Chatham Cup history to score a final hat-trick, and also the second player to score in two separate finals (he scored in Tramways' win in 1929). The tally of seven goals scored in the game was the highest aggregate until 1940.

== Results ==
=== Quarter-finals ===
Otago Final
27 June 1931

Seacliff	5 - 1	Northern
W. Hooper ×2, McCormack ×3	Report	Smith

Logan Park, Dunedin
Referee: Mr. W. P. Smith
Westland/Canterbury Final
25 July 1931

Dobson	5 - 5 (a.e.t.)	Nomads
W. White 2 (1 pen.), Richardson, Wilson, Short	Report	C. Goode, F. Smith ×2, F. Adams, C. Sharr

Victoria Park, Greymouth
Referee: Mr. S. Hewison
Westland/Canterbury Final
8 August 1931

Nomads	1 - 0 (a.e.t.) Replay	Dobson
F. Smith	Report

English Park, Christchurch
Referee: Mr. J. Cawtheray
Manawatu/Wellington Final
25 July 1931

St. Andrews	0 - 3	Petone FC
	Report	Watson, A. Leslie ×2

North Street Park, Palmerston North
Referee: Mr. C. E. Downes
South Auckland (Waikato)/Auckland Final
25 July 1931

Huntly Thistle	0 - 1	Tramurewa
	Report	McMillan

Huntly Domain, Huntly
Referee: Mr. J. Wallace

=== Semi-finals ("Island finals") ===
1931 North Island Final
15 August 1931

Tramurewa	2 - 0	Petone
Bell, Batty (pen.)	Report

Blandford Park, Auckland
Referee: Mr. R. Nesbit
1931 South Island Final
15 August 1931

Nomads	2 - 1	Seacliff
F, Smith, M. Wilson	Report	W. Hooper

English Park, Christchurch
Referee: Mr. J. Jennings

=== Final ===
1931 Chatham Cup Final
12 September 1931

Tramurewa	5 – 2 aet	Nomads
Bell ×3, Spong, H. Donaldson	Report	Wilson, Goode

Basin Reserve, Wellington
Referee: Mr.F. Saunders
