= Ces Dacre =

New Zealand cricketer, footballer & rugby league player

Personal information
- Full name: Charles Christian Ralph Dacre
- Born: 15 May 1899; Devonport, New Zealand
- Died: 2 November 1975 (aged 76); Devonport, New Zealand
- Batting: Right-handed
- Bowling: Slow left-arm orthodox
- Relatives: Life Dacre (brother)

Domestic team information
- Years: Team
- 1914/15–1932/33: Auckland
- 1928–1936: Gloucestershire

Career statistics
Competition	First-class
Matches	268
Runs scored	12,230
Batting average	29.19
100s/50s	24/59
Top score	223
Balls bowled	2,142
Wickets	39
Bowling average	31.25
5 wickets in innings	1
10 wickets in match	0
Best bowling	5/35
Catches/stumpings	166/6
- Source: CricketArchive, 15 August 2022
Association football career
- Position: Forward
Senior career*
Years	Team	Apps	(Gls)
- North Shore United
International career
1922–1923	New Zealand	4	(2)
- * Club domestic league appearances and goals

Charles Christian Ralph "Ces" Dacre (15 May 1899 – 2 November 1975) was a cricketer from New Zealand who also represented New Zealand in football (soccer). He played in the Auckland and Gloucestershire cricket teams and was in New Zealand's first team to go to England in 1927, though no Tests were played on the tour.

== Rugby and rugby league career ==
Dacre played rugby union in the war years for the Railway club (a wartime combination of the Marist and City clubs). In 1917 he was involved in a breakaway movement from the club that switched to rugby league, playing matches against Ponsonby United where he scored a try in their 12-3 win, and the City Rovers. Railway XIII merged with Grafton Athletic for the 1918 Auckland Rugby League season, though Dacre did not play for them.

== Cricket career ==
Dacre was a hard-hitting, somewhat impetuous, right-handed middle order batsman and an occasional slow left-arm bowler, who also kept wicket a few times in a first-class career that spanned more than 20 years. An outstanding schoolboy cricketer, he made his debut for Auckland when only 15 and appeared regularly for the team until the 1927–28 season, and then again in two matches in 1932–33.

He toured Australia twice and England once with New Zealand national cricket teams in the period before New Zealand played Tests. In 1927, in a strong batting side, he was a success with 1,070 runs at an average of 31.47 in the first-class matches. In the first innings of the match against Marylebone Cricket Club he scored 107 in an hour and a half. Though he returned to New Zealand the following winter, in 1928 he was back in England where he spent two years playing occasional cricket before becoming qualified to play County Championship matches for Gloucestershire.

Winning a regular place for Gloucestershire as soon as he was qualified in 1930, he made more than 1,000 runs in each of the next six seasons, though his average declined steadily over the period. His best season was 1930, when he hit his highest score, 223, with five sixes and 25 fours, in 255 minutes against Worcestershire. He scored two centuries in the match against Worcestershire in 1933. By 1935, he was averaging no more than 21 runs an innings and when his form declined further in 1936 his contract was terminated by mutual agreement and he returned to New Zealand.

== Football career ==
Dacre also represented New Zealand in football, appearing in 4 A-Internationals in 1922 and 1923, scoring 2 goals. Dacre was also a member of the North Shore side who reached the 1926 Chatham Cup final, losing 4–2 to Sunnyside.
