= Lee Stickland =

New Zealand footballer

Personal information
- Full name: Lee M Stickland
- Place of birth: New Zealand
- Position: Defender

Senior career*
| Years | Team | Apps | (Gls) |
- Manurewa

International career
| 1980 | New Zealand | 2 | (0) |
- * Club domestic league appearances and goals

Lee Stickland is a former football (soccer) player who represented New Zealand at international level.

Stickland played two official A-international matches for the New Zealand in 1980, the first a 2–0 win over Fiji on 21 February, the second as a substitute in a 6–1 win over Solomon Islands on 29 February.
