= William McGirr =

New Zealand cricketer

Personal information
- Full name: William Peter McGirr
- Born: 12 December 1859; Melbourne, Colony of Victoria
- Died: 6 May 1934 (aged 74); Seatoun, Wellington, New Zealand
- Relatives: Herb McGirr (son); Les McGirr (son)

Domestic team information
- Years: Team
- 1883/84–1889/90: Wellington

Career statistics
Competition	First-class
Matches	14
Runs scored	199
Batting average	12.43
100s/50s	0/0
Top score	47 not out
Balls bowled	1,522
Wickets	46
Bowling average	11.80
5 wickets in innings	2
10 wickets in match	0
Best bowling	6/36
Catches/stumpings	5/–
- Source: Cricinfo, 21 January 2018

William Peter McGirr (12 December 1859 – 6 May 1934) was a New Zealand cricketer who played first-class cricket for Wellington from 1883 to 1890.

McGirr was born in Melbourne, and migrated with his family to New Zealand when he was 10. He worked as a compositor with the Government Printing Office in Wellington for 40 years till he retired in 1915.

In his best bowling performance McGirr took 3 for 21 and 6 for 36 against Canterbury at the Basin Reserve in 1886–87, but Canterbury dismissed Wellington for 65 and 34 and won by 111 runs. In another defeat for Wellington he was the top-scorer and top wicket-taker against Nelson in March 1886, taking 5 for 30 in Nelson's only innings and scoring 11 and 1, when no other Wellington batsman reached double figures.

One of McGirr's sons, Herb, played Test cricket for New Zealand, and another son, Les, represented New Zealand at soccer.
