= Mount View Lunatic Asylum =

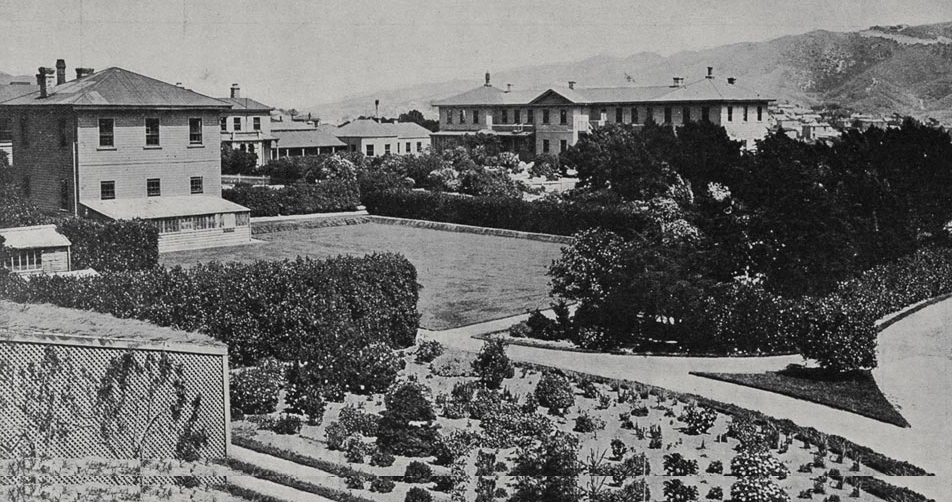
- Mount View Asylum, c. 1906

Geography
- Location: Wellington, New Zealand
- Coordinates: 41.306114°S 174.7810835°E (current Government House)

Organisation
- Type: Specialist

Services
- Beds: 200
- Speciality: Psychiatric hospital

History
- Former names: Mt. View Lunatic Asylum, Mount View Asylum
- Opened: 1873
- Closed: 1910

Links
- Lists: Hospitals in New Zealand

The Mount View Lunatic Asylum (alternates: Mt. View Lunatic Asylum, Mount View Asylum) was a psychiatric hospital located on 113 acres (46 ha) near the Basin Reserve in Wellington, New Zealand. Government House is now located on what were the asylum grounds. Work began in 1872, and the hospital opened in May 1873. It replaced Karori Lunatic Asylum, the first asylum in the country that was independent of a prison. Mount View was designed to accommodate around 50 patients. In May 1873, 27 patients moved from Karori to Mount View. An expansion was required soon after the asylum opened to accommodate more patients, so in 1879 the two-storey wooden structure was enlarged with a block for 50 male patients, and another wing was built during 1880.

From 1876 asylums were under government control and Dr Frederick Skae was appointed as administrator. J.H. Whitelaw was the lay administrator of Mount View and in 1881, after a complaint about treatment of patients, he was charged with violence towards them which resulted in investigations by a royal commission. Skae had supported Whitelaw's appointment but was held responsible when the commission upheld the charges. In 1895, under the inspector of asylums Duncan Macgregor, nurse Grace Neill became an official visitor to Mount View.

Around 1885 two additional wards were constructed. By 1905 there were 250 patients but within the next five years, they were transferred to Porirua Lunatic Asylum and other asylums, before Mount View's closure in 1910.
