= Jim Moyes =

New Zealand footballer

Personal information
- Full name: James G Moyes
- Place of birth: New Zealand

Senior career*
Years	Team	Apps	(Gls)
- Huntly Thistle

International career
1969	New Zealand	6	(0)
- * Club domestic league appearances and goals

James Moyes is a former association football player who represented New Zealand at international level.

Moyes made his full All Whites debut in a 0–0 draw with New Caledonia on 25 July 1969 and ended his international playing career with six A-international caps to his credit, his final cap an appearance in a 0–2 loss to Israel on 1 October 1969.
