= Wattie Cooper =

New Zealand footballer

Personal information
- Full name: Wattie R Cooper
- Place of birth: New Zealand

Senior career*
Years	Team	Apps	(Gls)
- Seacliff AFC
- Invercargill Rangers

International career
1927	New Zealand	2	(0)
- * Club domestic league appearances and goals

Wattie Cooper is a former association football player who represented New Zealand at international level.

Cooper played two official A-international matches for the All Whites in 1927, both against the touring Canadians, the first a 1–0 win on 9 July 1927, the second a 1–4 loss on 23 July.
