= Jack Tinkler =

New Zealand footballer

Personal information
- Full name: Jack Tinkler
- Place of birth: New Zealand

Senior career*
| Years | Team | Apps | (Gls) |
- Tramways

International career
| 1927 | New Zealand | 2 | (0) |
- * Club domestic league appearances and goals

Jack Tinkler is a former football (soccer) player who represented New Zealand at the international level.

Tinkler played two official A-international matches for the All Whites in 1927, both against the touring Canadians, the first a 2–2 draw on 25 June 1927, the second a 1–2 loss on 2 July.
