= Herb McGirr =

New Zealand cricketer (1891–1964)

- McGirr as part of the New Zealand team in 1927

Personal information
- Full name: Herbert Mendelson McGirr
- Born: 5 November 1891; Wellington, New Zealand
- Died: 14 April 1964 (aged 72); Nelson, New Zealand
- Batting: Right-handed
- Bowling: Right-arm medium
- Relatives: William McGirr (father); Les McGirr (brother)

International information
- National side: New Zealand (1930)
- Test debut (cap 16): 14 February 1930 v England
- Last Test: 21 February 1930 v England

Career statistics
Competition	Test	First-class
Matches	2	88
Runs scored	51	3,992
Batting average	51.00	28.71
100s/50s	0/1	5/23
Top score	51	141
Balls bowled	180	14,973
Wickets	1	239
Bowling average	115.00	27.49
5 wickets in innings	0	9
10 wickets in match	0	1
Best bowling	1/65	7/45
Catches/stumpings	0/–	54/–
- Source: Cricinfo, 1 April 2017

Herbert Mendelson McGirr (5 November 1891 – 14 April 1964) was a New Zealand cricketer who played in two Test matches in 1930. He was born at Wellington in 1891.

His father William McGirr played 14 matches for Wellington as an opening bowler from 1883–84 to 1889–90, taking 46 wickets at 11.80.

== Domestic career ==
An all-rounder, McGirr played first-class cricket for Wellington from 1913–14 to 1932–33. He was a middle or lower order batsman who hit the ball hard and a steady medium-paced bowler.

He toured England with the New Zealand cricket team under Tom Lowry in 1927, and scored more than 700 runs and took 49 wickets. No Tests were played on that tour.

His best bowling figures (innings and match) came against Canterbury in 1921–22, when he took 7 for 45 and 3 for 47; he also top-scored in Wellington's first innings. He hit his highest score, 141, against Otago in 1930–31, then scored 101 in the next match, against Canterbury.

== International career ==
In the 1929–30 season, when the MCC side under Harold Gilligan played the first Tests against New Zealand, McGirr played in only the third and fourth Tests, both at Eden Park, Auckland. The third Test was ruined by rain; McGirr did not bat and, opening the bowling, took no wickets. The fourth, arranged hastily to compensate for the washout, fared little better in terms of weather, but McGirr scored a half-century and took his only Test wicket, that of Stan Nichols.

He holds the Test match record for the fewest runs (51) in a complete career to include a half-century. He also holds the record as the oldest New Zealand player to make his Test debut: 38 years and 101 days.

== Late career ==
Despite suffering severely from varicose veins for much of his career, McGirr "was always looking at his captain and waiting to be given the ball because he always felt he could take a wicket". "The day was never too hot, nor the score too high, for Herb McGirr to want to bowl."

He was later the cricket coach at Nelson College. McGirr's obituary in Wisden in 1965 records that he played club cricket until he was 67, and gave up then only because "he slipped when taking in the milk" the day after scoring 70. He died at Nelson in 1964.
