= Bill Hooper (New Zealand footballer) =

New Zealand footballer (c.1900–1964)

Personal information
- Full name: William George Hooper
- Place of birth: New Zealand

Senior career*
Years	Team	Apps	(Gls)
- Seacliff

International career
1927	New Zealand	2	(1)
- * Club domestic league appearances and goals

William George Hooper (c. 1900 – 1964) was an association football player who represented New Zealand at international level.

Hooper played two official A-international matches for the All Whites in 1927, both against the touring Canadians, the first a 1–0 win on 9 July 1927, the second a 1–4 loss on 23 July, Hooper scoring New Zealand's goal.

Hooper was the first player to score in two different Chatham Cup finals, scoring two goals in Seacliff AFC's win in the inaugural 1923 final and also scoring for the same side in their 1925 final loss to Wellington YMCA.
