= Porirua Lunatic Asylum =

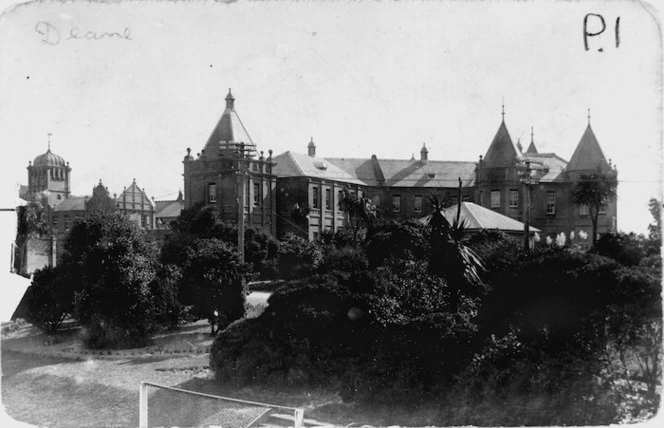

Geography
- Location: Porirua, New Zealand
- Coordinates: 41.141037°S 174.831952°E

Organisation
- Type: Specialist

Services
- Speciality: Psychiatric hospital

History
- Former names: Porirua Asylum, Porirua Hospital, Porirua Psychiatric Hospital
- Opened: 1887

Links
- Website: poriruahospitalmuseum.flh.nz
- Lists: Hospitals in New Zealand

Porirua Lunatic Asylum (alternates: Porirua Asylum, Porirua Hospital, Porirua Psychiatric Hospital; currently: Porirua Hospital Museum) was a psychiatric hospital located in Porirua. Established in 1887, it was at one time the largest hospital in New Zealand. The patients ranged from those with psychotic illnesses, to the senile, or alcoholics.

== History ==
"It was not really barbaric - they were not shut in and forgotten - they were moved to a clean room every twelve hours - there was no medication - there was nothing else we could do."

— Nurse Helen Reilly Ngaere Thompson,

Land was acquired in 1884 for a hospital farm that would offer 'work therapy' to relieve overcrowding at Wellington's Mount View Lunatic Asylum. Construction of a one storied 7,000 square feet (650 m^{2}) building containing 24 apartments, H Ward, began in 1886. Porirua Lunatic Asylum, as it was originally named, was opened in the following year and Dr. Thomas Radford King was appointed as its medical superintendent, though in less than a year, he was replaced by Dr. Gray Hassell.

By 1905, Porirua Hospital had 700 beds. In the early 1900s, the facility had 2000 staff and patients, affording a major effect on the Wellington Region's development. By 1928, nurses moved into their own two-story, 100-room building. The resident population was 1,500 in the 1940s.

After the 1942 Wairarapa earthquakes, 800 patients had to be moved to other hospitals. Subsequently, the main building was demolished and eleven new villas were constructed.

Most patients were released into community-based care in the late 1980s after the release of the Wellington Hospital Board White Paper on psychiatric care. The first built ward, F Ward, was closed in 1977, considered unfit and uneconomical. In 1980, the Puketiro Centre operated as a regional base for children with developmental problems. In 1987, the hospital celebrated its 100-year anniversary, opening the Porirua Hospital Museum in F Ward.

== In popular culture ==
The hospital is featured in the RNZ podcast Nellie's baby. Villa 9 and F ward are mentioned in episode 2.

== See also ==
- Kingseat Hospital
- Karori Lunatic Asylum
- Tokanui Psychiatric Hospital
- Carrington Hospital
- Mount View Lunatic Asylum
- Seacliff Lunatic Asylum
- Seaview Asylum
- Sunnyside Hospital
