= Laypeople =

Laypeople or laypersons may refer to:

- Someone who is not an expert in a particular field of study
  - Lay judge
    - Lay judges in Japan
- Laity, members of a church who are not clergy
  - Lay brother
  - Lay sister
  - Lay preacher
  - Lay apostolate
  - Lay cardinal
  - Lay reader
  - Lay speaker
  - Lay leader
