= Peter Simonsen =

New Zealand footballer

Personal information
- Full name: Peter R. Simonsen
- Date of birth: 17 April 1959 (age 67)
- Place of birth: Christchurch, New Zealand
- Position: Midfielder

Senior career*
Years	Team	Apps	(Gls)
1977–1978	Nelson United		
1981–1982	Gisborne City		
1982	Manurewa		
1984–1985	Gisborne City		

International career
1978–1985	New Zealand	11	(1)
- * Club domestic league appearances and goals

Peter R. Simonsen (born 17 April 1959, in Christchurch, New Zealand) is a footballer who represented the New Zealand national team, being part of the 1982 squad that participated at 1982 FIFA World Cup finals.

Simonson scored on his full All Whites international debut in a 2–0 win over Singapore on 1 October 1978, the only goal he was to score in official internationals.

He was a member of the squad that qualified for the 1982 FIFA World Cup finals in Spain, his sole appearance in qualifying a substitute appearance in the tie-breaking play-off match against China in Singapore, and he did not make the field in Spain. Including friendlies and unofficial games against club sides, Simonson played 28 times for New Zealand, ending his international playing career with 11 official A-international caps to his credit, his final cap an appearance in a 2–0 win over Fiji on 7 June 1985.
