= Huntly Thistle AFC =

Football club in New Zealand

Huntly Thistle
- Full name: Huntly Thistle Association Football Club
- Nicknames: The Thistle, The Blues, The Pigs, The Prickles
- Founded: 1926
- Ground: Huntly Domain, Huntly, New Zealand
- Manager: Sarah Wright
- League: Waikato Division 1
- 2026: Waikato Division 1, 5th of 10
- Website: www.sporty.co.nz/huntly_thistleafc/
Home colours

Huntly Thistle are an association football club based in the New Zealand town of Huntly, in the northern Waikato region. The club first team competes in the Waikato Division 1, whilst they currently have teams in the WaiBop Premiership, Senior Men's, Senior Women's, Juniors and WSSFA College. Earlier points in their history they were one of the stronger teams in the Waikato. The club played in the top flight of the Northern League in the early 1970s, and at that time contained the club's only full international player, Jim Moyes.

The team has reached the last-32 stage of the Chatham Cup on three occasions, in 1971, 1977, and 1989. Early records of the Chatham Cup are incomplete, but it appears likely that Thistle reached far later stages of the competition during the competition's early years, as they were regular entrants from the fourth year of the competition's existence, at which time far fewer teams took part, and qualified as Waikato regional champions in 1926, 1931, 1951, 1953, and 1955.
