= Peter Gerrard =

New Zealand footballer

Personal information
- Full name: J Peter Gerrard
- Place of birth: New Zealand

Senior career*
| Years | Team | Apps | (Gls) |
| ante 1926–post 1937 | North Shore United | | |

International career
| 1933 | New Zealand | 3 | (0) |
- * Club domestic league appearances and goals

Peter Gerrard is a former association football player who represented New Zealand at international level.

Gerrard played three official A-international matches for the All Whites in 1933, all on tour against trans-Tasman neighbours Australia, the first a 2–4 loss on 5 June 1933, followed by a 4–6 loss and another 2–4 loss on 17 and 24 June respectively.
