= Michael McGerr =

American historian

Michael McGerr is an American historian working at Indiana University in the History Department, a unit of the College of Arts and Sciences. In 2005 he was appointed the Paul V. McNutt Professor of American History, an endowed professorship at Indiana University. In his career, Michael McGerr has worked at MIT, Yale and Indiana University. He is the author of A Fierce Discontent and a co-author of the text Making a Nation.
