= Thomas Adolphus Bowden =

English-born New Zealand Anglican clergyman, farmer, teacher and educationalist

Thomas Adolphus Bowden JP
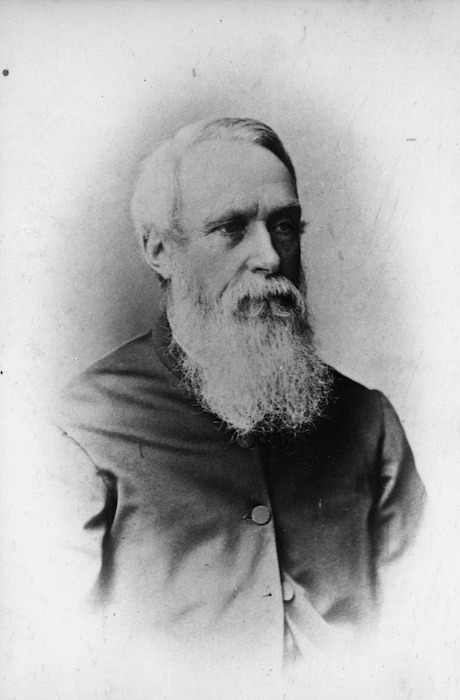
- Born: 26 July 1824; London, United Kingdom
- Died: 24 June 1906 (aged 81); Wakefield, New Zealand
- Education: Magdalen Hall, Oxford

Thomas Adolphus Bowden JP (26 July 1824 – 24 June 1906) was an English-born New Zealand Anglican clergyman, farmer, teacher and educationalist.

== Biography ==
Thomas Bowden was born in London, England, on 26 July 1824. He was the son of John Bowden, a solicitor, and his wife Rebecca Treacher. Bowden received education at private schools in London, before completing a B.A. at Magdalen Hall, Oxford from 1842 to 1845. He married his cousin, Caroline Treacher, on 26 February 1848, with whom he would have nine children. Bowden emigrated with his family to Nelson, New Zealand in 1855 where he initially began farming and briefly acted as Curate for the parish of Waimea South. Bowden became secretary to the Bishop of Nelson, Edmund Hobhouse, in 1860 and would also teach at the local school. In 1865, the Wellington Provincial Government appointed Bowden as inspector of schools, although he would resign three years later and became headmaster of Wellington Grammar School. Due to a shortage of educational resources, Bowden published many text books and in 1873 set up the New Zealand Educational Depository. Bowden also became a justice of the peace and served as inspector of the Karori Lunatic Asylum. From 1879, Bowden returned to the church and took up clergy positions in Greymouth, Nelson and Wakefield. He retired in 1882 and died in Wakefield on 24 June 1906.

== Selected publications ==
- An introduction to the geography of New Zealand (1868)
- Manual of New Zealand geography (1869)
- Geographical outlines of New Zealand (1872)
