= Charles Ballard =

New Zealand footballer

Personal information
- Full name: W Charles Ballard
- Position: Forward

Senior career*
| Years | Team | Apps | (Gls) |
- Wellington YMCA

International career
| 1922–1927 | New Zealand | 8 | (1) |
- * Club domestic league appearances and goals

Charles Ballard was an association football player who represented New Zealand, playing in New Zealand's first ever official international.

Ballard made his full All Whites debut in New Zealand's inaugural A-international fixture, beating Australia 3–1 on 17 June 1922 and ended his international playing career with eight A-international caps and one goal to his credit, his final cap an appearance in a 4–1 loss to Canada on 23 July 1927.

Ballard appeared in two Chatham Cup finals, in 1923 and 1925.
