= Dan Jones (New Zealand footballer) =

New Zealand footballer

Personal information
- Full name: Daniel G Jones
- Position: Midfielder

Senior career*
Years	Team	Apps	(Gls)
1923	Waterside		
1924	Harbour Board		
1927	North Shore United		

International career
1922–1927	New Zealand	6	(0)
- * Club domestic league appearances and goals

Daniel Jones was an association football player who represented New Zealand, playing in New Zealand's first ever official international.

Jones made his full All Whites debut in New Zealand's inaugural A-international fixture, beating Australia 3-1 on 17 June 1922 and ended his international playing career with six A-international caps to his credit, his final cap an appearance in a 1-4 loss to Canada on 23 July 1927.
