= Keith Mackay =

New Zealand footballer

Personal information
- Full name: Keith Gordon Mackay
- Date of birth: 8 December 1956 (age 69)
- Place of birth: Wellington, New Zealand
- Height: 1.70 m (5 ft 7 in)
- Position: Midfielder

Senior career*
Years	Team	Apps	(Gls)
1980–1982	Gisborne City		
1983–1984	Manurewa		

International career
1980–1984	New Zealand	36	(1)
- * Club domestic league appearances and goals

Keith "Buzzer" Gordon Mackay (born 8 December 1956 in Wellington, New Zealand) is a football (soccer) player who represented New Zealand internationally, appearing in all 3 matches of New Zealand's first FIFA World Cup finals appearance.

Mackay made his full All Whites debut in a 4–0 win over Mexico on 20 August 1980. He represented the All Whites for all three matches at the 1982 FIFA World Cup in Spain, where they lost to Scotland, USSR and Brazil. Mackay ended his international playing career having played 48 times for New Zealand. 36 of these appearances were A-international caps. He scored a solitary goal in A-internationals against Fiji during the 'Road to Spain' 1982 World Cup qualifying campaign. His final full New Zealand cap was as a substitute in a 1–1 draw with Fiji on 18 October 1984. Keith ended his All White career later that year against England B in Nottingham. He is currently the Coach of the Junior Boys' team at Alfriston College in Manurewa, South Auckland.
