= Dave Bright =

English-born New Zealand footballer

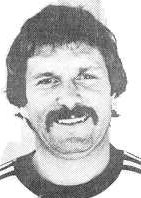

Personal information
- Full name: David John Bright
- Date of birth: 29 November 1949 (age 76)
- Place of birth: Maidstone, England
- Position: Defender

Senior career*
Years	Team	Apps	(Gls)
- Sittingbourne F.C.
- Faversham Town FC
- Ramsgate Athletic FC
- Manurewa AFC
- Papatotoe FC
- North Shore United FC

International career
1979–1982	New Zealand	8	(0)
- * Club domestic league appearances and goals

David John Bright (born 29 November 1949) is a former footballer who represented New Zealand gaining 8 A-international caps from 1979 to 1982.

Born in England, Bright emigrated to New Zealand in 1974 and made his first appearance for the All Whites in 1979 in a friendly match against Norwich City and his first official match on 29 June 1979 in a 6–0 win over Fiji.

He was a member of the All Whites squad at the 1982 FIFA World Cup in Spain, where they lost to Scotland, USSR and Brazil.

Bright retired from international football after the World Cup, and returned to New Zealand to continue to play in the National League for Manurewa and, later, Papatoetoe, before turning his hand to coaching.

His son Kris Bright also represented New Zealand at the international level.
