= Edward Seager (asylum superintendent) =

New Zealand policeman, gaoler and asylum superintendent

Edward William Seager (8 May 1828 – 14 July 1922) was a notable New Zealand policeman, gaoler and asylum superintendent.

== Early life ==
Seager was born in London, England, in 1828.

== Career ==
Seager began his career as a porter in a London law firm. After the death of his mother, Seager began work as a policeman and assistant immigration officer under the tutelage of an old friend, James Fitzgerald. Because Seager lacked a solid education and social status he found difficulty in achieving promotions.

In 1857, Seager was promoted to sub-inspector. Seager was known for his sense of humor and would routinely play practical jokes on prisoners under his watch. In 1862, Seager was promoted to the warden of Lyttelton Gaol, an asylum. In 1863 Seager convinced the Canterbury Provincial Council to open a new asylum, Canterbury Asylum, later known as Sunnyside Hospital.
