= Les McGirr =

New Zealand footballer

Personal information
- Full name: Leslie William McGirr
- Date of birth: 8 October 1897
- Place of birth: Wellington, New Zealand
- Date of death: 17 June 1961 (aged 64)
- Place of death: Wellington, New Zealand

Senior career*
Years	Team	Apps	(Gls)
- Wellington YMCA

International career
1927	New Zealand	4	(0)
- * Club domestic league appearances and goals

Leslie William McGirr (8 October 1897 – 17 June 1961) was an association footballer who represented New Zealand at international level.

McGirr made four appearances for the All Whites, all against the touring Canadians. His first match ended in a 2–2 draw on 25 June 1927, followed by a 1–2 loss, a 1–0 win and his final match a 1–4 loss on 23 July 1927.

His brother Herb McGirr played Test cricket for New Zealand.
