= Sunnyside Hospital =

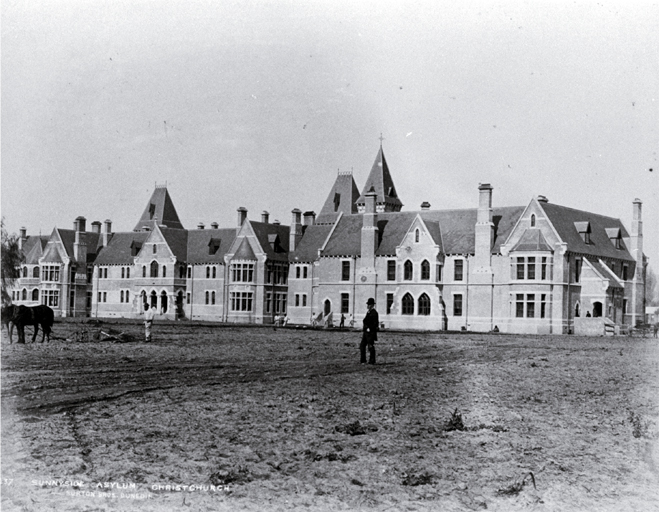
- Sunnyside Asylum, Christchurch. Completed in 1891, this was one of Mountfort's last major works. Designed in a chateauesque Gothic, the large windows created the air of a country house rather than place of incarceration.

Geography
- Location: Christchurch, Canterbury Region, New Zealand
- Coordinates: 43.5509°S 172.5929°E

Services
- Emergency department: No

History
- Founded: 1863
- Closed: 1999

Links
- Lists: Hospitals in New Zealand

Sunnyside Hospital (1863–1999) was the first mental asylum to be built in Christchurch, New Zealand. It was initially known as Sunnyside Lunatic Asylum, and its first patients were 17 people who had previously been kept in the Lyttelton gaol. In 2000, Sunnyside Hospital was renamed Hillmorton Hospital and took over the mental health services that are based on the old Sunnyside Hospital grounds.

== Architecture ==
Sunnyside was primarily designed by the architect, Benjamin Mountfort in the Gothic Revival style, with an administration building designed by John Campbell. Some of the buildings were built by Daniel Reese.

Hillmorton Hospital rebuild started in the 2020s with a number of services based on The Princess Margaret Hospital site being rebuilt on the Hillmorton site. The rebuild became the first mental health wards in New Zealand to achieve a 4 Star Green Star certification. A further development started in 2025 aims to provide new inpatient wards for 80 patients. It is due to be finished in 2027.

== Staff ==
Edward Seager was the first superintendent of Sunnyside Hospital. He had previously been superintendent of Lyttelton Gaol. Seager's wife, Esther Seager, had been matron of the gaol. She was appointed matron at Sunnyside in 1863.

In 1995, four years before the hospital's closure, nurses walked off the job because of dangerous working conditions.

== Chatham Cup ==
A football team largely made up of staff from the hospital, was the first Christchurch champions of the Chatham Cup in 1926.

== Notable patients ==
- Rita Angus (1950), artist Angus regarded being in Sunnyside Hospital as a mainly positive experience. She praised the staff, who encouraged her to draw again during her recovery. She enjoyed the weaving course that she attended as part of occupation therapy.
- Janet Frame, writer. Frame described some of her experiences in Sunnyside Hospital in her autobiography An Angel at My Table, and her novel Faces in the Water.

[Mrs R. said it would] be a good idea for me to admit myself as a voluntary boarder to Sunnyside Mental Hospital where there was a new electric treatment, which, in her opinion, would help me. . . . I woke toothless and was admitted to Sunnyside Hospital and I was given the new electric treatment, and suddenly my life was thrown out of focus. I could not remember. I was terrified.

- Mabel Howard ( – 23 June 1972), union worker, politician, and New Zealand's first woman cabinet minister.
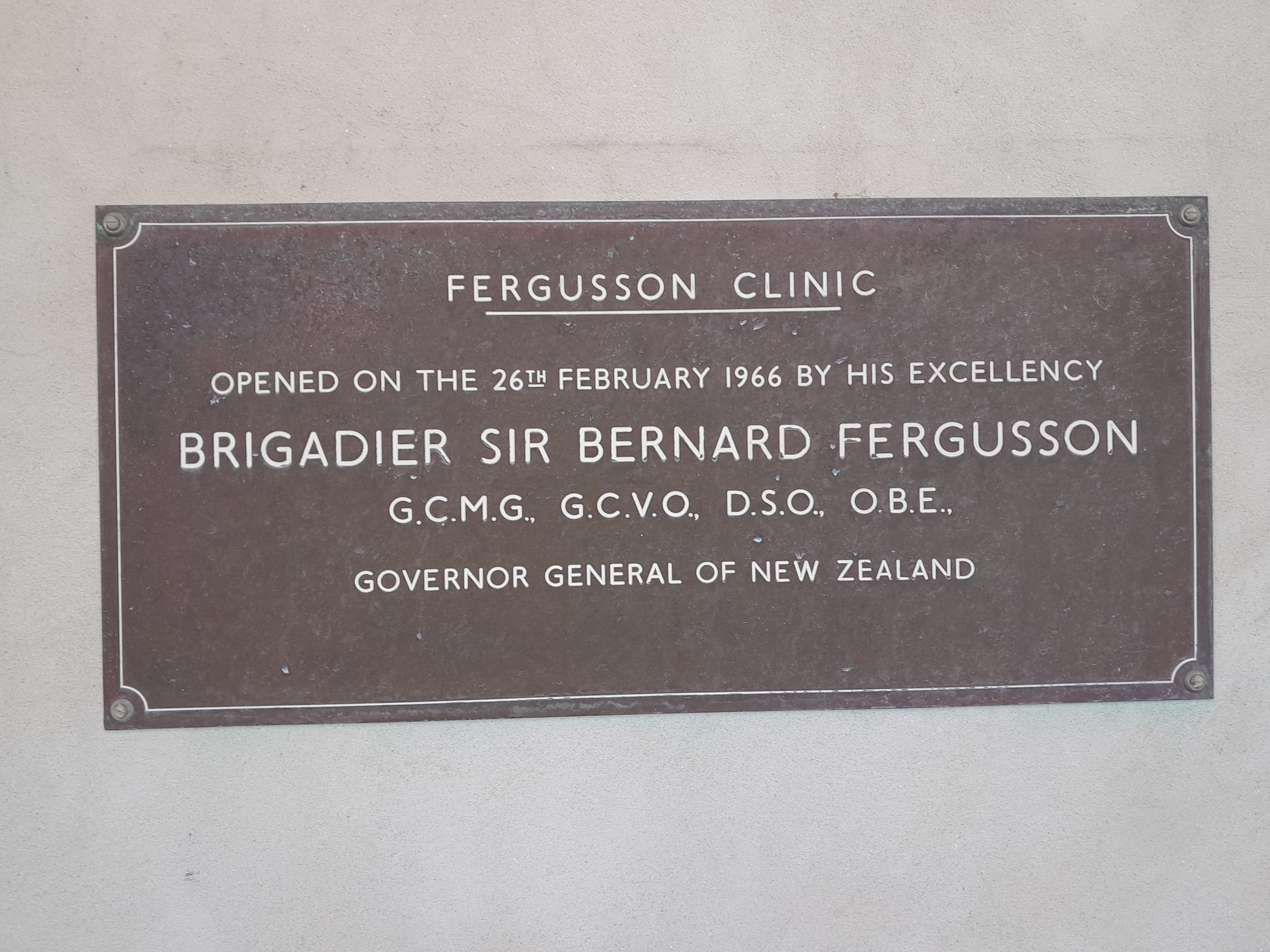
- The Fergusson Clinic was opened in 1966 at Sunnyside Hospital
  Richard Pearse (June 1951 – July 1953), inventor and aviator. Pearce flight-tested aircraft in New Zealand from 1902, and is reputed to have successfully flown on about 31 March 1903.
- Lionel Terry (1906, 1909–1914), white supremacist and murderer.

== Footnotes ==
Chatham Cup
Preceded by YMCA Wellington	Winner; 1926 Chatham Cup	Succeeded by Ponsonby
