= Brooklyn Northern United AFC =

Brooklyn Northern United
- Full name: Brooklyn Northern United AFC
- Nickname: BNU
- Founded: 1972 (1916 as Institute Old Boys)
- Ground: Wakefield Park
- League: Capital 3
- 2026: Capital 3], 4th of 9
- Website: www.bnu.org.nz
Home colours	Away colours

Brooklyn Northern United AFC is an association football club in Wellington, New Zealand. The club competes in the Capital 3.

Commonly referred to as 'BNU', the club is an amalgamation of Northern, formed by members of Wellington's Chinese community in 1949, and Brooklyn United, founded as Institute Old Boys in 1916 before renaming in 1956. The two clubs amalgamating in 1972.

In 2004 Brooklyn Northern United became an Associate Member Club of Team Wellington who played in the New Zealand Football Championship.

== Club history ==
Season(s)	Achievement
1978	Central League Division Two (Men), Winner
2002	Capital Division One (Men), Winner
2010	Central Women's Premier
2014	Capital Premier Division (Women), winner
2014	Capital Division One (Men), runner-up (promoted)

== Coaching staff ==
Position	Name
First Team Head Coach	David Silva
First Team Manager	
Reserve Team Head Coach	Mathew Le Gros
