= Manurewa AFC =

- Full name: Manurewa Association Football Club
- Nicknames: The Mighty Rewa, Blue & Golds
- Founded: 1929, re-formed 1959
- Ground: Memorial Park, Manurewa, Auckland
- Chairman: Todd Murphy
- Coach: Brett McMurdoch
- League: NRFL Championship
- 2026: NRFL Championship, 12th of 12
Home colours

Manurewa AFC is an amateur football club in Manurewa, Auckland, New Zealand. The club competes in the NRFL Championship.

== History ==
Chart of yearly ladder positions for Manurewa in NZ 1st division soccer

Manurewa AFC was formed by the merger of Tramways (1929 Chatham Cup winner) and another club named Manurewa. The merged entity initially used the portmanteau name of Tramurewa, during which time the club won the 1931 Chatham Cup. Tramuwera reverted to the name of Manurewa in 1959, the name currently used by the club.

The club was originally based at the Manurewa War Memorial Park, and the club shared facilities with the Manurewa Rugby Club. In 1983, the club moved to Gallaher Park.

Manurewa competed in the New Zealand National Soccer League from 1979 to 1992, finishing as champions in 1983 and in 2023, finishing in 6th place.

In 2008 Manurewa won the NRFL Division 1 with Brad Armstrong finishing top scorer in the league with 22 goals. Coach, Mark Armstrong, claimed the coach of the year award for the league.

== Notable former players ==
The following players represented New Zealand while playing for Manurewa:

- Dave Bright
- Frank van Hattum
- Keith Mackay
- Sam Malcolmson
- Lee Stickland
- Steve Sumner
- Mark Armstrong

The following players represented New Zealand futsal while playing for Manurewa:

- Marvin Eakins
- Clay Chapel

Chatham Cup
Preceded by Petone	Winner*; 1929 Chatham Cup	Succeeded by Petone
Preceded by Petone	Winner†; 1931 Chatham Cup	Succeeded by Wellington Marist
Preceded by Nelson United	Winner; 1978 Chatham Cup	Succeeded by North Shore United
Preceded by Mount Wellington	Winner; 1984 Chatham Cup	Succeeded by Napier City Rovers
