= Seacliff AFC =

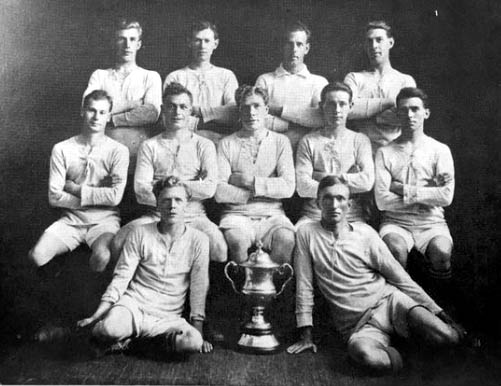
- The team that won the first Chatham Cup in 1923
- Full name: Seacliff Association Football Club
- Nickname(s): The Light Blues
- Ground: Seacliff, Otago
Home colours

Seacliff AFC was a soccer club based in the Otago region of New Zealand's South Island. They are notable for being the first team to win the Chatham Cup competition. They contested the final on later occasions in 1924, 1925, and 1929. Many of the team came from the staff of the Seacliff Lunatic Asylum; with the demise of the hospital in the 1940s, the team went into hiatus.

A new team using the Seacliff name formed in the early 1980s and competed in the Chatham Cup between 1990 and 1997, reaching the second round in 1994. The new team was initially largely from the staff of the Cherry Farm Hospital which had been built to replace the Seacliff institution; with the closure of this hospital, the team also soon disbanded.

Chatham Cup
Preceded by Inaugural	Winner; 1923 Chatham Cup	Succeeded by Auckland Harbour Board
