= Kimihia, New Zealand =

Kimihia
- Suburb
- Interactive map of Kimihia
- Coordinates: 37.547°S 175.168°E
- Country: New Zealand
- City: Waikato District
- Electoral ward: Huntly Ward

Area
  - Land: 182 ha (450 acres)

Population (2023 census)
  - Total: 1,224
  - Density: 673/km^{2} (1,740/sq mi)

| | Ohinewai | Lake Kimihia |
| State Highway 1 | Kimihia | Waikato Expressway |
| Huntly | Lake Hakanoa |

Kimihia is a north-eastern suburb of Huntly, New Zealand.

== Demographics ==
Kimihia covers 1.82 km^{2} (0.70 sq mi). It is part of the larger Huntly East statistical area.

Historical population
| Year | Pop. | ±% p.a. |
|---|---|---|
| 2006 | 687 | — |
| 2013 | 843 | +2.97% |
| 2018 | 1,113 | +5.71% |
| 2023 | 1,224 | +1.92% |

Kimihia had a population of 1,224 in the 2023 New Zealand census, an increase of 111 people (10.0%) since the 2018 census, and an increase of 381 people (45.2%) since the 2013 census. There were 582 males, 627 females and 9 people of other genders in 363 dwellings. 2.0% of people identified as LGBTIQ+. There were 273 people (22.3%) aged under 15 years, 234 (19.1%) aged 15 to 29, 504 (41.2%) aged 30 to 64, and 222 (18.1%) aged 65 or older.

People could identify as more than one ethnicity. The results were 59.6% European (Pākehā); 34.8% Māori; 13.2% Pasifika; 10.5% Asian; 1.0% Middle Eastern, Latin American and African New Zealanders (MELAA); and 1.2% other, which includes people giving their ethnicity as "New Zealander". English was spoken by 95.3%, Māori language by 11.0%, Samoan by 0.7%, and other languages by 11.3%. No language could be spoken by 2.5% (e.g. too young to talk). New Zealand Sign Language was known by 1.5%. The percentage of people born overseas was 21.3, compared with 28.8% nationally.

Religious affiliations were 36.8% Christian, 2.7% Hindu, 1.5% Islam, 2.2% Māori religious beliefs, 0.7% Buddhist, 0.2% New Age, and 0.7% other religions. People who answered that they had no religion were 47.8%, and 7.8% of people did not answer the census question.

Of those at least 15 years old, 129 (13.6%) people had a bachelor's or higher degree, 504 (53.0%) had a post-high school certificate or diploma, and 336 (35.3%) people exclusively held high school qualifications. 78 people (8.2%) earned over $100,000 compared to 12.1% nationally. The employment status of those at least 15 was that 468 (49.2%) people were employed full-time, 90 (9.5%) were part-time, and 30 (3.2%) were unemployed.

== Education ==
Kimihia School is a co-educational state full primary school covering years 1 to 8, with a roll of 345 as of July 2025. There has been a school at Kimihia since at least 1897.
