= Bush Tramway Club =

Heritage railway in New Zealand

Coordinates: 37.603314°S 175.056921°E

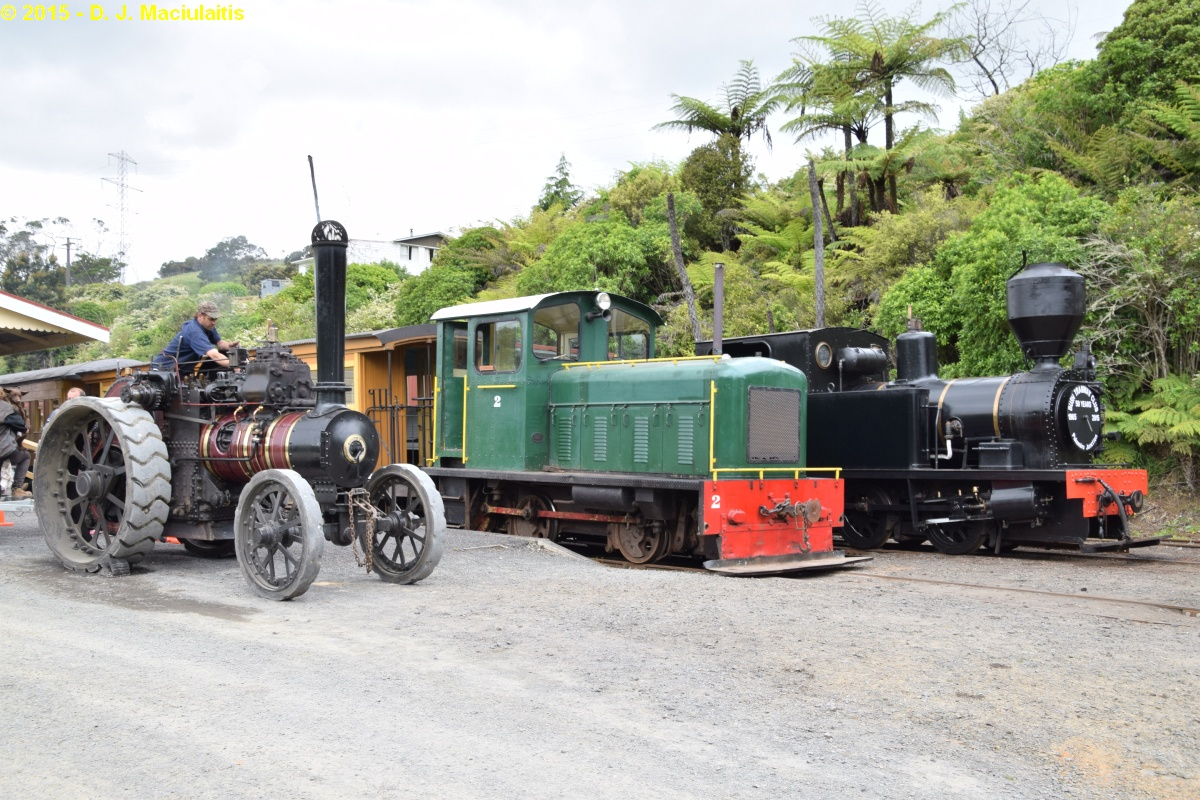
Bush Tramway Club

The Bush Tramway Club is a heritage railway 12 km (7.5 mi) west of Huntly along the Rotowaro Road, in the Waikato region of New Zealand. It regularly operates restored locomotives along a 5.4 km (3.4 mi) Rotowaro-Glen Afton section of the former Glen Afton Branch. Open days are the first Sunday of each month.

The Bush Tramway Club was founded in 1965 to preserve equipment from New Zealand's former bush tramways and light industrial lines, railway lines which were used to remove timber from the bush and transport coal from mines to dairy factories. It obtained use of the Rotowaro-Glen Afton section in 1974 and has since purchased most of the rail corridor land. The Glen Afton Branch Line, a former New Zealand Railways (NZR) branch line to the Pukemiro coal mine was opened in 1915 and closed in 1973.

The locomotives include geared Climax and Heisler locomotives (formerly used on the Ellis and Burnand Tramway, Ongarue), a NZR F class locomotive number 185, several diesel shunting locomotives used by the NZR and industrial lines, and some jiggers.

== Locomotives and Rolling Stock ==
=== NZR Steam Locomotives ===
Original class and number	Builder	Builder's number	Year built	Arrived	Status	Notes
F 185	Dübs & Company	1171	1874	1972	Stored	Entered New Zealand Railways Department service on 16 May 1879. It was withdrawn in November 1933 and sold to the Taupiri Coal Company, Rotowaro. It was then sold to Mines Department, Rotowaro in 1951. It was then purchased to the club in August 1972 and moved to the Museum of Transport and Technology for restoration. It was recommissioned in 1973. In 1977 it was transported to the club's railway. It was taken out of service in 1985 for an overhaul. It was recommissioned in 1996. It was taken out of service in 2003 and overhaul. It returned to service in 2005. In the mid to late 2000s it was taken out of service and is currently awaiting an overhaul.

=== Industrial Steam Locomotives ===
Type	Builder	Builder's number	Year built	Arrived	Status	Notes
C^{B}	A & G Price	117	1927	1977	In service	Built in 1927 for the Auckland City Council for the Upper Huia Dam construction. Sold to Hayward Timber Co, Waimiha in 1933. After getting into financial difficulty the Hayward operations at Waimiha were purchased by Ellis & Burnand. Cb 117 continued work at Waimiha until 1945 when it was moved to Manunui to shunt between the NZR and the Ellis Veneer factory. E & B was purchased by Fletcher Industries in 1962 and the loco was placed into storage. It was then acquired by the New Zealand Railway Preservation Soc who moved Cb 117 and a Price C loco to Taringamotu for storage. It was transferred to the club in 1974 and moved to MoTaT. The Club shifted its assets to the site at Pukemiro Junction and the Cb was restored to operation by September 1996.
Climax	Climax Manufacturing Co.	1650	1924	1977	In service	Built in 1924 for Ellis and Burnand, Ongarue. Purchased by J. Melse, Mangapehi in 1960. It was then sold to the Museum of Transport and Technology in 1969. It was then sold-on to the club in 1977. Stored until 2011 when restoration commenced. Following extensive overhauling, Climax 1650 returned to steam in early 2025.
E	A & G Price	111	1924	1958	Under overhaul or restoration	Built for Selwyn Timber, Mangatapu in 1923. It was placed into storage in 1929. In 1935 it was then purchased by Ellis and Burnand for their Mangapehi plant. It was sold to their Ongarue plant in 1944. In 1958 it was purchased by the club. In 2013 restoration commenced to static display.
Heisler style	Stearns Manufacturing Company	1063	1902	1967	Scrapped	Built in 1902 for Brownlee & Co, Havelock. In 1915 it was then sold to New Forest Sawmilling Co., Ngahere. Unused from 1965 to 1967. In 1967 it was sold to the club and was used sometimes at Pukemiro until it was scrapped.
Heisler style	Stearns Manufacturing Company	1082	1904	1977	Stored	Built in 1904 for the Taupo Totara Timber Company as their N^{O}. 2. In 1947 it was then sold to Ellis & Burnand, Ongarue. In 1966 it was sold to the club and was stored at the Museum of Transport and Technology. In 1977 it was then moved to Pukemiro. It was used there for a while but it was placed into storage.
Peckett	Peckett & Sons	1630	1923	1977	In service	Built in 1923 for State Mines, Rotowaro. Used until 1972 when it was purchased by the club and stored at the Museum of Transport and Technology. In 1977 it was then moved to Pukemiro. In 2002 it was withdrawn for an overhaul. It returned to service in April 2013.

- The rear bogie of Hawthorn Leslie 3663 of 1927 is held by the club.

=== NZR Diesel Locomotives ===
Original class and number	TMS class and number	Builder	Builder's number	Year built	Arrived	Status	Notes
F 216		Neilson & Company	3751	1888	1985	Stored	Built for the Kaihu Valley Railway Company, in 1888, F216 was the very last of her class, which first appeared in 1872. Became an NZR engine when the Kaihu Valley Railway was bought in 1889, by NZR. Withdrawn on 20 April 1932. It was then sold to AFFCo, Horotiu. In 1936 it was converted to a diesel locomotive. It was used until 1977 when it was sold to Goldfields Railway. In 1985 it was then sold to the club and is currently stored.
T^{R} 16	33	Drewry	2068	1936	1983	Stored	Entered NZR service on 7 November 1936. Renumbered as TR 33 in 1978. Withdrawn in May 1983 and is now used for part supplies for T^{R} 34.
T^{R} 34	217	Drewry	2149	1939	1985	In service	Entered NZR service on 3 February 1940. Renumbered as TR 217 in 1978. Withdrawn in April 1985.

The frame of F^{A} 41 is held by the club. Converted to diesel in 1964.

=== Industrial Diesel Locomotives ===
Original number	Builder	Builder's number	Year built	Arrived	Status	Notes
401	Drewry	2623	1957	1997	In service	Built for the New Zealand Electricity Department in 1957 for their Meremere plant and operated as NZED 401. It was purchased by the club in 1997 and stored until 2004. It was then restored in 2005 to operating condition and reclassified as BTC 1.
402	Drewry	2624	1957	1991	In service	Built for the New Zealand Electricity Department in 1957 for their Meremere plant and operated as NZED 402. It was purchased by the club in 1997 and stored until 2004. It was then restored in 2005 to operating condition and reclassified as BTC 2.
D3	Planet	2168	1939	1985	In service	Built in 1939 for Farmworld. Sold to Bisley Industries, Hamilton. It was then purchased in 1983 by the Goldfields Railway. It was then sold-on to the club.
	A & G Price	n/a	1971	1988	Stored	Used as the A & G Price works shunter at Thames. Sold to the club in 1988.
	Union Foundry	32	1947	1968	Stored	Built in 1947 for Ellis & Burnand, Ongarue. It was sold to the club in 1968.

=== Battery Locomotives ===
Builder	Builder's number	Year built	Arrived	Status	Notes
Goodman Mfg Co	3511	1922	n/a	In service	Built for The New Zealand Co-Operative Dairy Company Limited's Frankton box making factory in 1922. Overhauled from 2002 to 2008.

=== Bush Jiggers ===
Builder	Year built	Arrived	Status	Notes
O. W. Smith	1948	1972	In service	Built in 1948 for the New Zealand Railways Department for the Mamaku Tramway. It was then sold in 1972 to Paul Mahoney. In 2004 it was on-sold to Ian Jenner who restored it to operational condition in 2009. It has been operated at the Glenbrook Vintage Railway twice, once in February 2011 and in March 2013.
O. W. Smith	1948	1972	Under overhaul or restoration	Built in 1948 for the New Zealand Railways Department for the Mamaku Tramway. It was then sold in 1972 to Paul Mahoney. In 2004 it was on-sold to Ian Jenner and stored. In the 2010s it was placed into active restoration.

=== Former Industrial Diesel Locomotives ===
Builder	Builder's number	Year built	Arrived	Status	Notes
Drewry	2248	1947	1986	Stored	Built for the Ohai Railway Board as their N^{O}. 1 in 1947. Used until 1968 when it was purchased by State Mines, Kaitangata. In 1974 it was sold-on to State Mines, Rotowaro. In 1986 it was sold to the club and repainted in their green livery. It was then sold to Bruce McLuckie in 2011. In 2014 it was purchased by the Rimutaka Incline Railway Heritage Trust and arrived at their Maymorn site on 21 October in the same year.
Drewry	2585	1957	1986	Under overhaul or restoration	Built for the Ohai Railway Board as their N^{O}. 1 in 19457. Used until 1968 when it was purchased by State Mines, Kaitangata. In 1974 it was sold-on to State Mines, Rotowaro. In 2005 it was sold to the Wallis Family for the Wallis Family. In 2008 it was sold to the Rotorua Ngongotaha Railway Trust and is currently being restored.
