= Kimihia railway station =

Railway station in New Zealand

Kimihia Railway Station
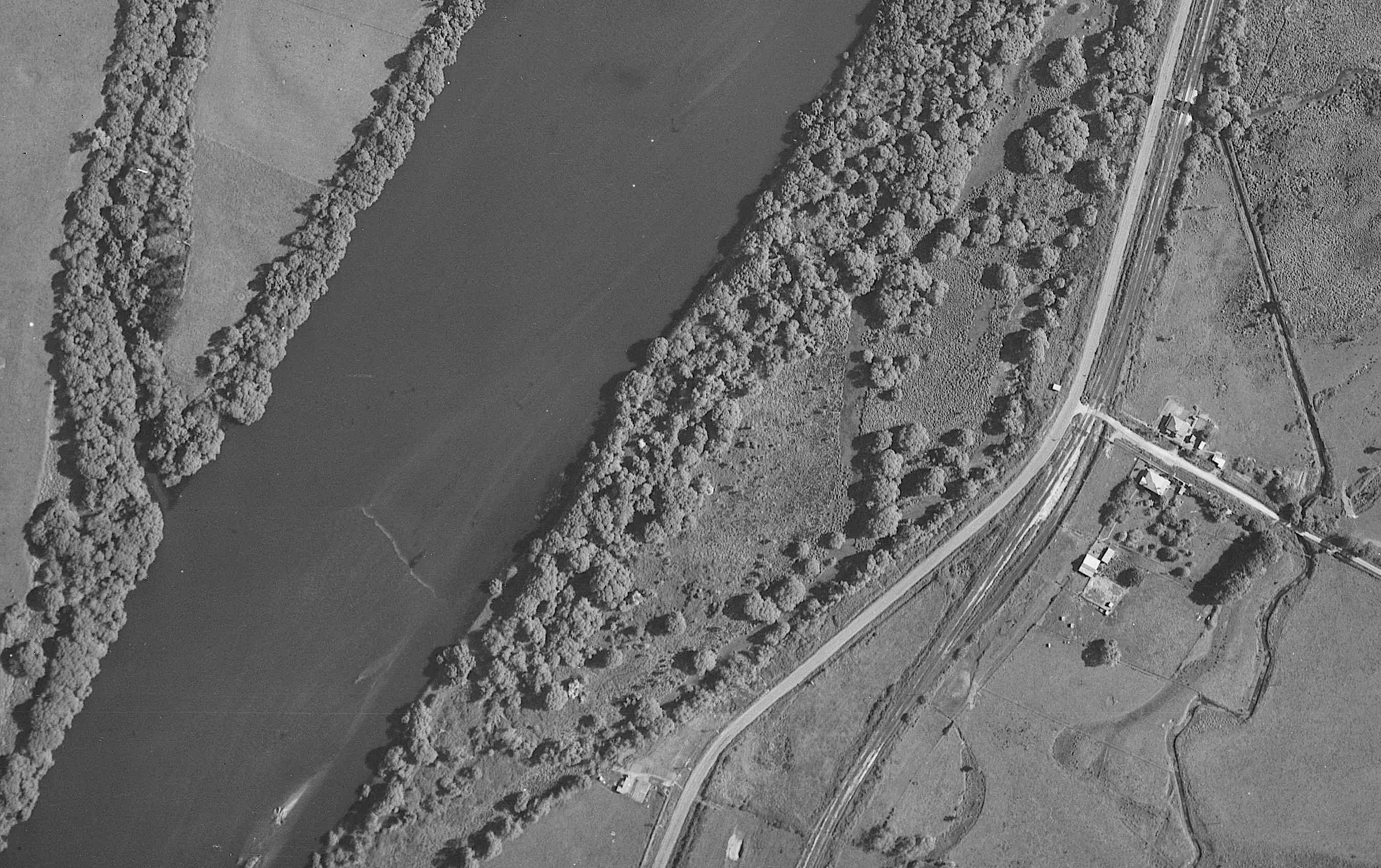
- Aerial view of Fisher Road in 1941 (centre-right of photo). The white patches to the south of the road were probably the site of the station until 1939

General information
- Location: Huntly; New Zealand
- Coordinates: 37.516555°S 175.165759°E
- Elevation: 11 m (36 ft)
- Owner: KiwiRail Network
- Line: North Island Main Trunk
- Distance: Wellington 577.92 km (359.10 mi)
- Tracks: double track from 27 August 1939

History
- Opened: 13 August 1877
- Closed: 27 August 1939

Services
Preceding station	Historical railways	Following station
Ohinewai; Line open, station closed 4.02 km (2.50 mi)	North Island Main Trunk; KiwiRail	Huntly; Line open, station open 4.2 km (2.6 mi)
Location

Kimihia Railway Station was on the North Island Main Trunk line, north of Huntly in the Waikato District of New Zealand. The station was in 1886 measured as 19 mi 33 ch (31.2 km) south of Mercer, which is where an unnamed block is shown on the 1929 map, near the junction of Fisher Road with SH1, about 1.4 km (0.87 mi) north of the junction with the Kimihia branch. That junction was 101.06 km (62.80 mi) south of Auckland and 576.54 km (358.25 mi) from Wellington.

One source said it was much nearer Huntly, where Kimihia Rd crossed the railway. Kimihia Rd level crossing was closed to traffic in 1945.

== History ==
The station opened when the Main Trunk was extended from Mercer to Ngāruawāhia, on 13 August 1877, built on part of Robert Reilly Ralph's (later owner of Ralph's coalmine) 1,000 acres (400 ha) farm.

Kimihia was usually not shown in timetables and was often one of the minor stations not served by passenger trains. An 1894 petition asked for Kimihia siding be converted into a flag station. In 1895 trains called at Kimihia Siding for school children and it became a flag station from 7 February 1896. By the end of that year it had a shelter shed, passenger platform and a passing loop for 37 wagons.

To ease congestion on the single track railway, a passing loop capable of holding 72 wagons was built in 1929. Work on doubling the track northwards started in 1937 and the station closed on 27 August 1939, when double track working started between Ohinewai and Huntly.

In 1944 Kimihia became part of Huntly Borough.

== Kimihia colliery branch ==
Map showing the Kimihia Branch

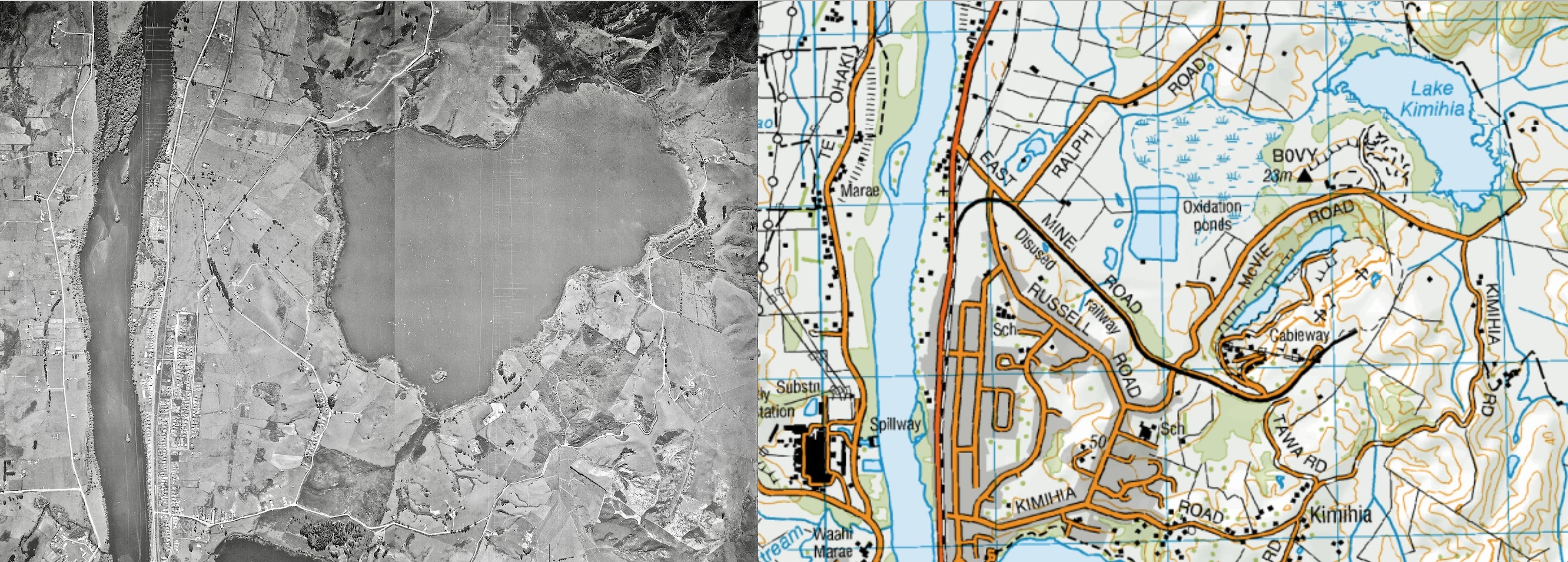
Kimihia railway branch line can be faintly seen in the 1941 aerial photo, which follows the same route as the line open from 1946 to 2017, as shown on the 2018 Topomap. The lake was largely drained to allow for opencast coal mining

Powers to construct the mine branch were given in 1885. Initially it was a 1 mi 76 ch (3.1 km) branch around the southern shore of Lake Kimihia to the Taupiri Reserve Colliery Co. mine, which was opened on 1 August 1887 and named the Taupiri Branch. That mine closed due to a fire in 1910.

State Coal Mines started an opencast mine in 1943 to extract the coal left by the previous mine. It produced coal from 1944, when agreement was reached to use the Taupiri Coal Co's sidings, but the branch wasn't reopened until 1946. The opencast mine closed in 1977 and was replaced by Huntly East Mine in 1978.

On 21 August 1979 the first loaded train used the branch, which started 3 km (1.9 mi) north of Huntly and extended 3.58 km (2.22 mi) east to the coal loading bins. From 7 July 1981 the Railway Corporation took over maintenance of the branch from the Mines Department. Until 2013 the mine was producing about 450,000 tonnes of coal a year, some 95% of it going by rail to Glenbrook steel mill. The mine closure was announced on 8 October and the branch closed on 21 October 2015. It was 3 km (1.9 mi) when lifted in 2017.

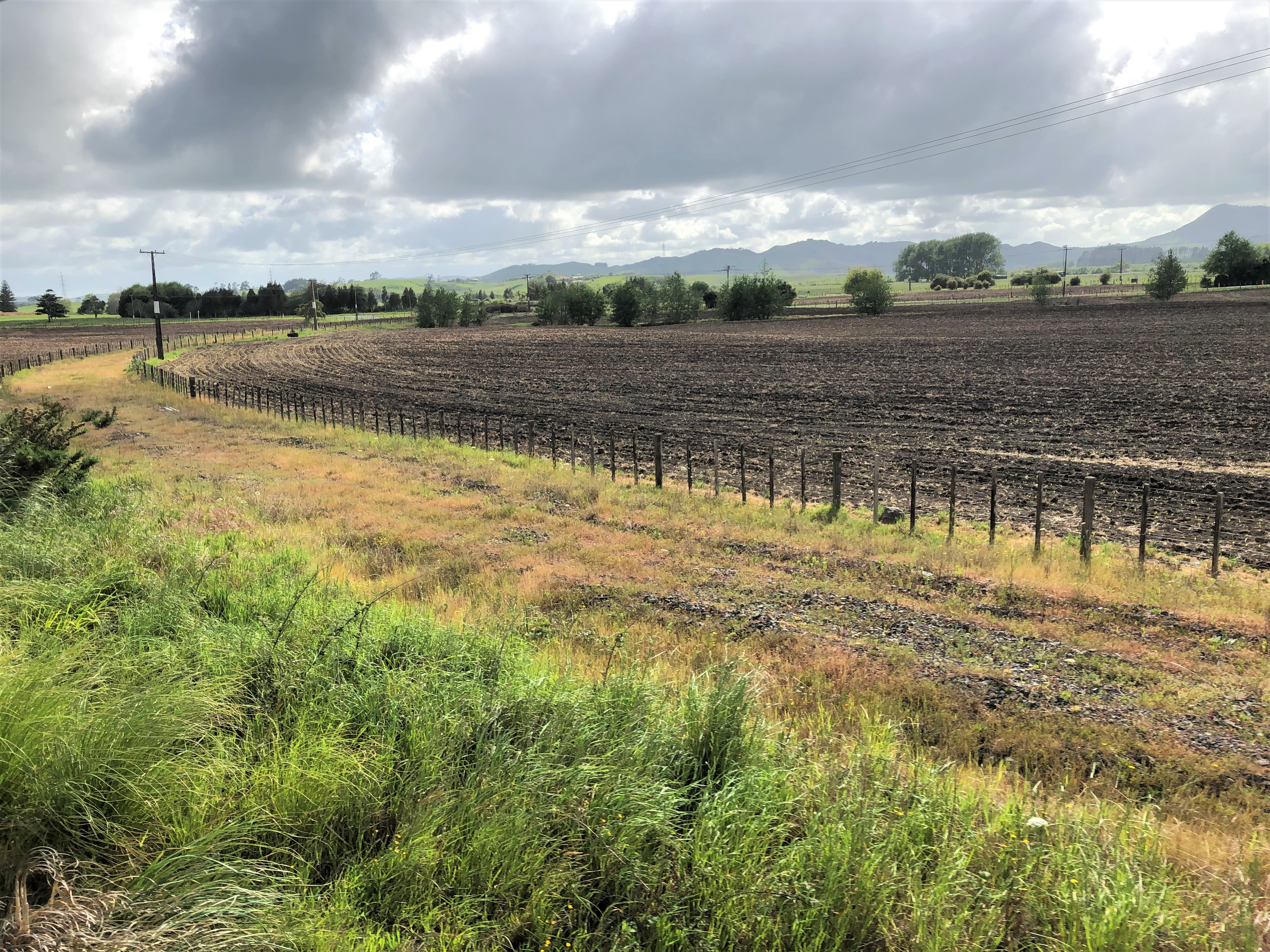
2019 view of Kimihia Branch from NIMT

== See also ==
- North Island Main Trunk
- Cambridge Branch
- Glen Afton Branch
- Glen Massey Line
- Kinleith Branch
- Rotorua Branch
- Thames Branch
