= Glen Afton =

- Township
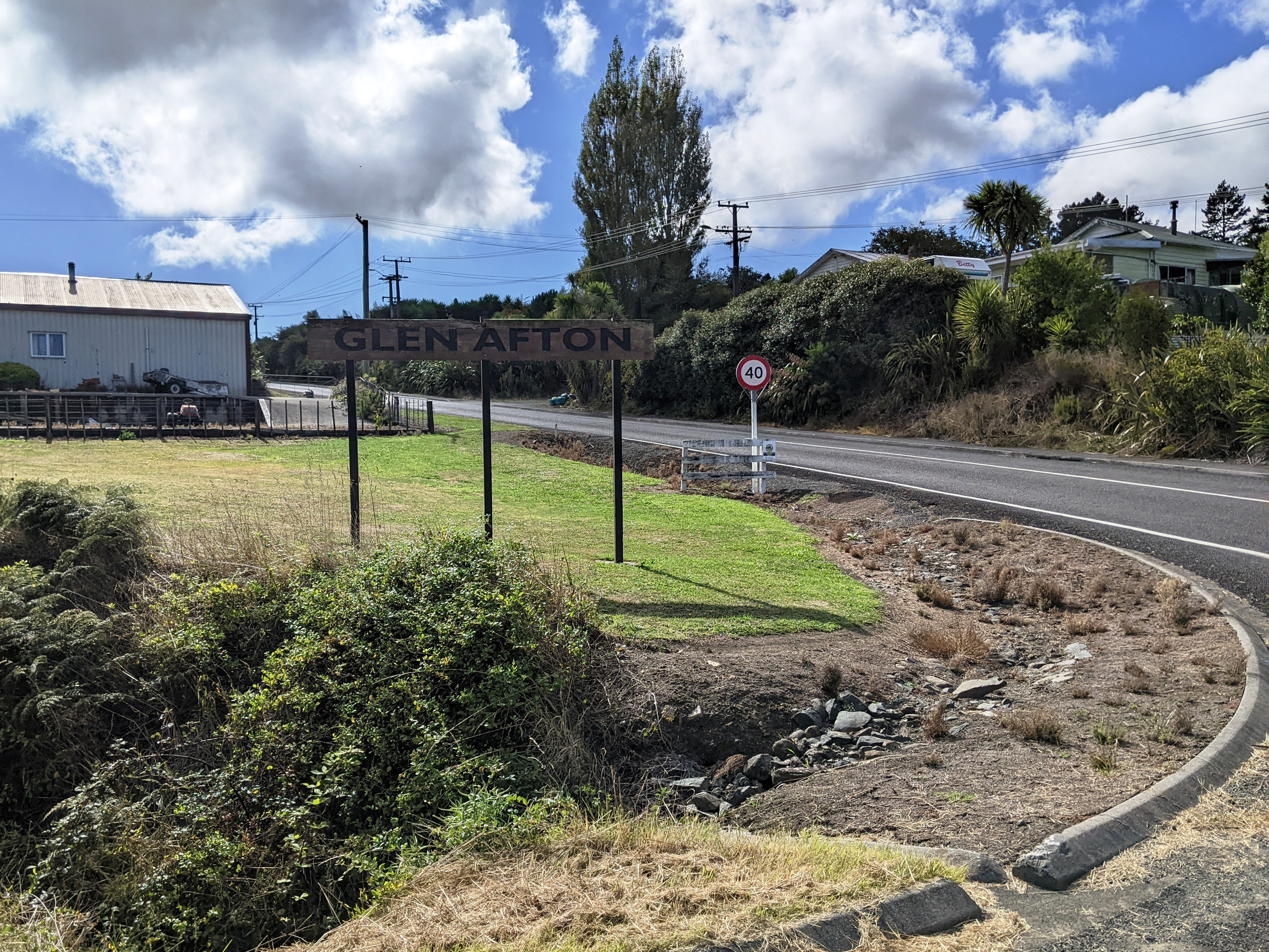
- Glen Afton sign
- Interactive map of Glen Afton
- Coordinates: 37°37′S 175°02′E
- Country: New Zealand
- Region: Waikato
- District: Waikato District
- Ward: Western Districts General Ward; Tai Raro Takiwaa Maaori Ward
- Electorates: Waikato; Hauraki-Waikato (Māori)

Government
  - Territorial Authority: Waikato District Council
  - Regional council: Waikato Regional Council
  - Mayor of Waikato: Aksel Bech
  - Waikato MP: Tim van de Molen
  - Hauraki-Waikato MP: Hana-Rawhiti Maipi-Clarke

Area
  - Total: 12.57 km^{2} (4.85 sq mi)

Population (2023 census)
  - Total: 129
  - Density: 10.3/km^{2} (26.6/sq mi)
- Postcode(s): 3771

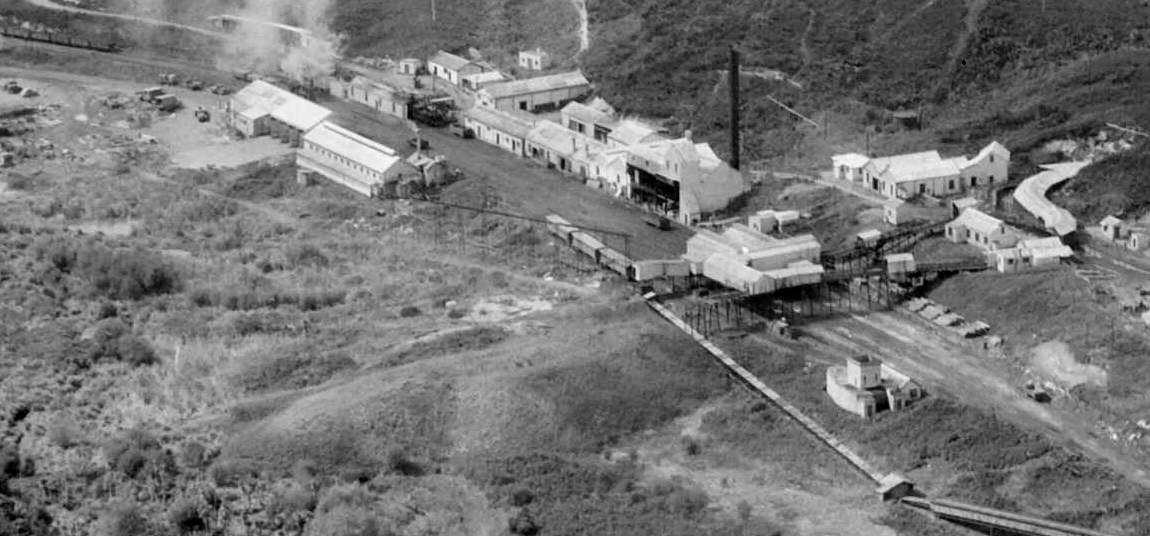

Glen Afton and Pukemiro are twin settlements in the Waikato District, in northern Waikato region of New Zealand's North Island. The nearest town is Huntly, some 14 km (9 mi) away.

The settlements were previously an important coal-mining centre, but only one large and one small open-cast coal mine still operates in the area. There was a mining disaster at Glen Afton on 24 September 1939: 11 men were asphyxiated by carbon monoxide.

The Bush Tramway Club runs the Glen Afton (formerly Pukemiro) Line Heritage Railway, which was formerly the Glen Afton Branch until 1977. The Country Music Club meets at the Bush Tramway Club rooms.

== Puke Coal ==
Puke Coal operates near the Bush Tramway Club and has consent to produce up to 180,000 tonnes of coal a year, though actual production was described as "relatively modest" in 2014. The mine is open cast, recovering coal left by previous mining.

The mine is privately owned, so there are no permits and no public record of production. The company was formed in 2011 and employs 25 staff in its mining and landfill work.

== Demographics ==
=== Glen Afton ===
Glen Afton locality covers 12.57 km^{2} (4.85 sq mi). It is part of the larger Huntly Rural statistical area.

Historical population for Glen Afton
Year	Pop.	±% p.a.
2006	111	—
2013	102	−1.20%
2018	114	+2.25%
2023	129	+2.50%

Glen Afton had a population of 129 in the 2023 New Zealand census, an increase of 15 people (13.2%) since the 2018 census, and an increase of 27 people (26.5%) since the 2013 census. There were 69 males and 60 females in 48 dwellings. 2.3% of people identified as LGBTIQ+. The median age was 39.4 years (compared with 38.1 years nationally). There were 33 people (25.6%) aged under 15 years, 15 (11.6%) aged 15 to 29, 60 (46.5%) aged 30 to 64, and 21 (16.3%) aged 65 or older.

People could identify as more than one ethnicity. The results were 83.7% European (Pākehā); 37.2% Māori; 4.7% Pasifika; 2.3% Middle Eastern, Latin American and African New Zealanders (MELAA); and 4.7% other, which includes people giving their ethnicity as "New Zealander". English was spoken by 97.7%, Māori language by 7.0%, and other languages by 4.7%. No language could be spoken by 2.3% (e.g. too young to talk). The percentage of people born overseas was 4.7, compared with 28.8% nationally.

Religious affiliations were 18.6% Christian, 4.7% Māori religious beliefs, 2.3% Buddhist, 4.7% New Age, and 2.3% other religions. People who answered that they had no religion were 67.4%, and 4.7% of people did not answer the census question.

Of those at least 15 years old, 9 (9.4%) people had a bachelor's or higher degree, 54 (56.2%) had a post-high school certificate or diploma, and 33 (34.4%) people exclusively held high school qualifications. The median income was $29,800, compared with $41,500 nationally. 6 people (6.2%) earned over $100,000 compared to 12.1% nationally. The employment status of those at least 15 was that 39 (40.6%) people were employed full-time, 12 (12.5%) were part-time, and 3 (3.1%) were unemployed.

=== Pukemiro ===
Pukemiro covers 0.16 km^{2} (0.062 sq mi). It is part of the larger Huntly Rural statistical area.

Historical population for Pukemiro
Year	Pop.	±% p.a.
2006	144	—
2013	126	−1.89%
2018	135	+1.39%
2023	141	+0.87%

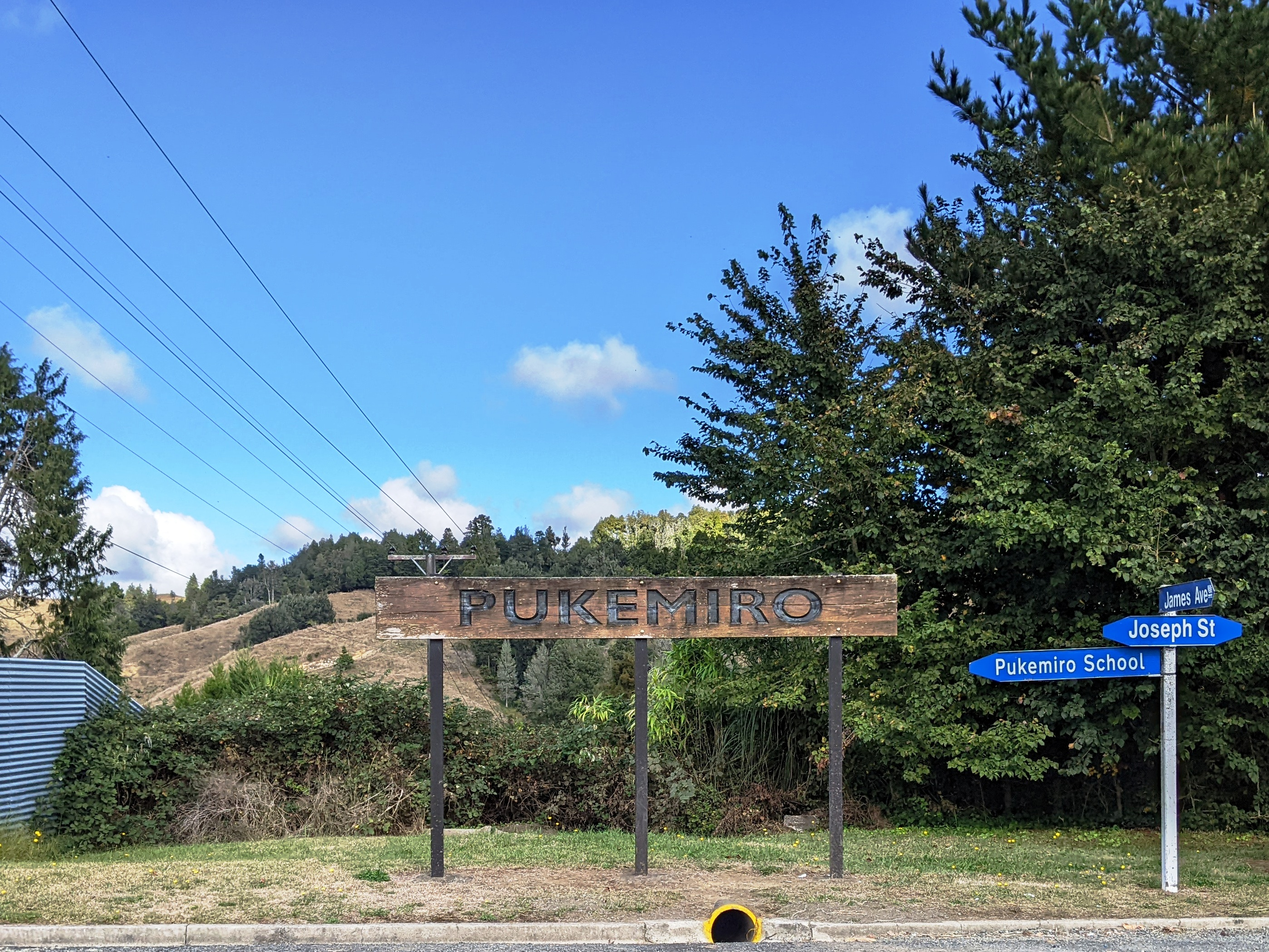
Pukemiro sign

Pukemiro had a population of 141 in the 2023 New Zealand census, an increase of 6 people (4.4%) since the 2018 census, and an increase of 15 people (11.9%) since the 2013 census. There were 81 males, 57 females and 3 people of other genders in 66 dwellings. 4.3% of people identified as LGBTIQ+. The median age was 48.3 years (compared with 38.1 years nationally). There were 27 people (19.1%) aged under 15 years, 9 (6.4%) aged 15 to 29, 81 (57.4%) aged 30 to 64, and 24 (17.0%) aged 65 or older.

People could identify as more than one ethnicity. The results were 74.5% European (Pākehā), 36.2% Māori, 4.3% Pasifika, and 2.1% Asian. English was spoken by 97.9%, Māori language by 10.6%, and other languages by 4.3%. The percentage of people born overseas was 12.8, compared with 28.8% nationally.

Religious affiliations were 17.0% Christian, and 2.1% other religions. People who answered that they had no religion were 70.2%, and 8.5% of people did not answer the census question.

Of those at least 15 years old, 9 (7.9%) people had a bachelor's or higher degree, 54 (47.4%) had a post-high school certificate or diploma, and 48 (42.1%) people exclusively held high school qualifications. The median income was $27,500, compared with $41,500 nationally. 3 people (2.6%) earned over $100,000 compared to 12.1% nationally. The employment status of those at least 15 was that 42 (36.8%) people were employed full-time, 12 (10.5%) were part-time, and 6 (5.3%) were unemployed.

== Education ==
Pukemiro School opened in 1905 and reached a peak roll of over 120 students. It closed in 2021.
