= Huntly railway station, Waikato =

New Zealand railway station

Huntly Railway Station
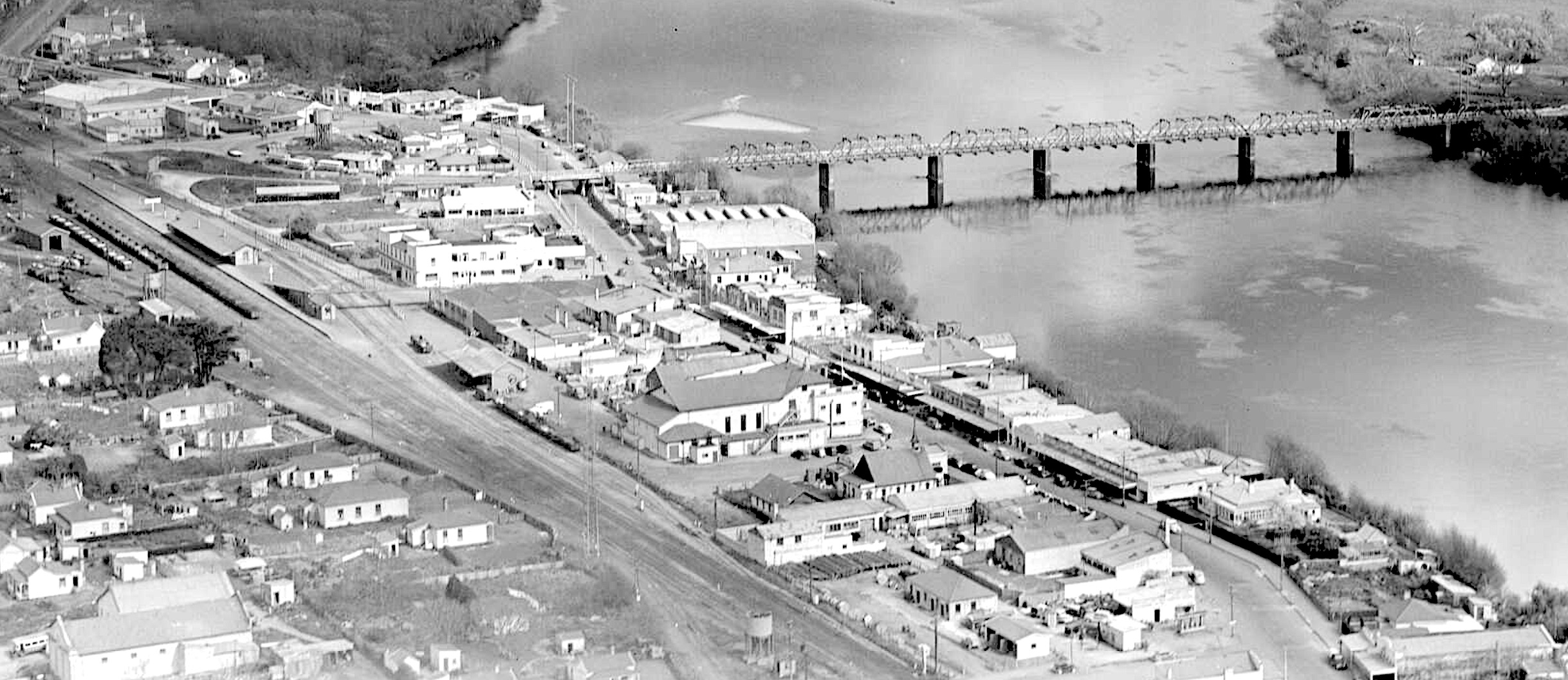
- Huntly station, footbridge and road/rail bridge in 1949

General information
- Location: Glasgow Street, Huntly; New Zealand
- Coordinates: 37°33′36″S 175°09′36″E
- Elevation: 13 m (43 ft)
- Owner: KiwiRail Network
- Line: North Island Main Trunk
- Distance: Wellington 573.76 km (356.52 mi)
- Tracks: double track from 4 December 1938 to south from 27 August 1939 to north

History
- Opened: 13 August 1877 original 6 April 2021
- Closed: 10 April 2005
- Rebuilt: 1939, 2021
- Former names: Ruawaro, Huntley

Services
| Preceding station | KiwiRail | Following station |
|---|---|---|
| Pukekohe towards Auckland Strand | Te Huia | Rotokauri towards Hamilton (Frankton) |
Historical railways
| Kimihia Line open, station closed towards Waitematā | North Island Main Trunk KiwiRail | Taupiri Line open, station closed towards Wellington |
Location
- Location within New Zealand

Raahui Pookeka-Huntly Railway Station (formerly Huntly Railway Station) is on the North Island Main Trunk line and the Awaroa Branch in the town of Huntly in the Waikato District of New Zealand, 65 mi (105 km) south of Auckland. It is 7.31 km (4.54 mi) north of Taupiri and 2.78 km (1.73 mi) south of Kimihia. The station was named Raahui Pookeka-Huntly for its reopening for the new Te Huia train on 6 April 2021.

== History ==
The station opened on 13 August 1877, originally as Huntley Lodge or Ruawaro c1878, and Huntley from 1879 up to 1882, though all 3 names had been used locally since at least 1877. On 21 May 1972 the station was closed.

A 4th class stationmaster's house was built in 1878, cattle pens were added in 1881 and by 1884 Huntly had a 4th class station, platform, cart approach, loading bank, cattle yards, water crane, fixed signals, stationmaster's house, urinals and passing loop for 41 wagons. Platelayer's cottages were built in 1884. The station was enlarged in 1893. It had a Class 4 station building, described, in 1902, as built of wood and iron, with, "a large waiting room, ladies' waiting room, a lamp and luggage room, and the post and telegraph office. There is also a goods shed, and an engine and coaling shed for the engine. About ten trains daily pass through the station, and the staff consists of five hands, besides the stationmaster."

By 1896 there was also a 28 ft (8.5 m) × 26 ft (7.9 m) goods shed and a weighbridge (in 1899 a 13-ton weighbridge was moved from Huntly to Te Aroha, though one remained at least to 1911). A verandah was added in 1897 and a ganger's house in 1898. In 1899 a former Huntly coal shed was moved to Waikomiti (now Glen Eden) as a goods shed. From 1 April 1878 to 16 September 1909 there was a Post Office at the station, run by NZR staff. Two horses were used for shunting until replaced by an engine in 1911. By 1927 there were 25 railway houses at Huntly, 4 more were added in 1939 and another 3 in 1956. The 1939 station building was slightly to the south of the earlier station and on an island platform. Accommodation noted in 1939 included a 1.5 ton crane in the goods shed at the north end, a signal cabin to the south, a tool hut, Train Examiners' hut and drivers' room.

Traffic grew steadily (see graph and table below) so, in March 1920, the Town Board set out the need for a larger station. Requests were dismissed until, on 2 July 1936, the First Labour Government's new Minister of Railways said that provided the Government was re elected, a new station building would be provided.

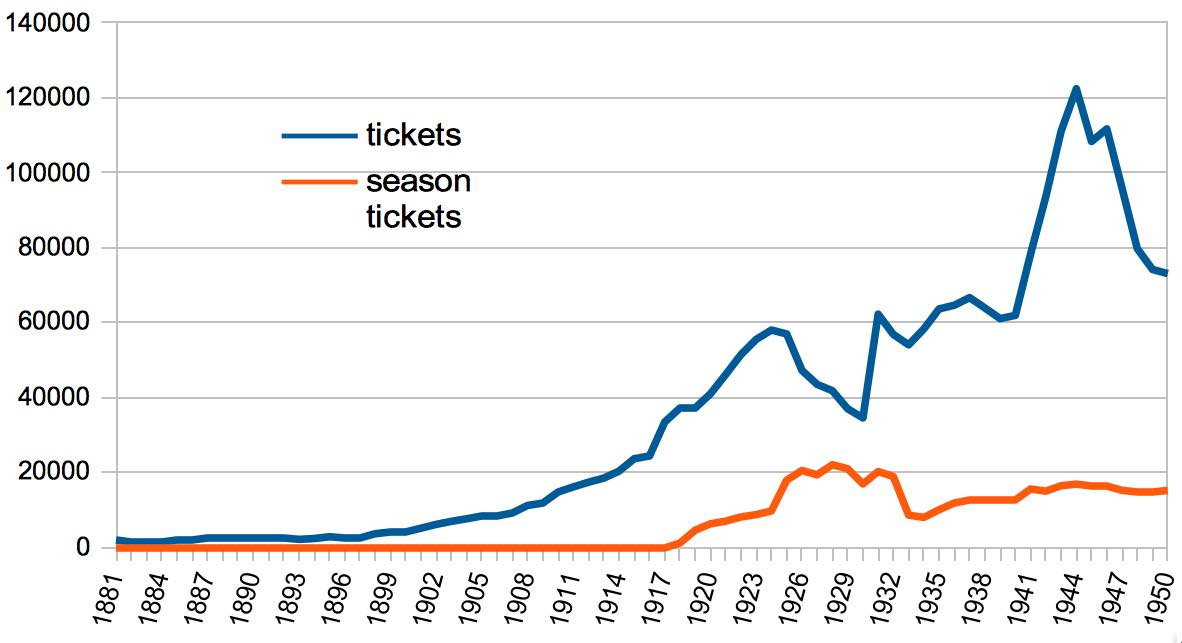
tickets and season tickets sold at Huntly 1881–1950 (derived from figures in table). The growth in season tickets in the 1920s was probably due to opening of mines on the Awaroa Branch, on which it was said in 1928 that, "About 350 miners who are able to take advantage of the cheap workmen's tickets issued by the Railway Department travel daily to and from their work at the mines."

| year | tickets | season tickets | staff |
| 1881 | 1,960 | 0 | 2 |
| 1882 | 1,501 | 0 | 2 |
| 1883 | 1,305 | 0 | 2 |
| 1884 | 1,681 | 0 | 2 |
| 1885 | 2,103 | 2 | 3 |
| 1886 | 2,144 | 2 | 3 |
| 1887 | 2,547 | 0 | 3 |
| 1888 | | | |
| 1889 | 2,241 | 0 | 3 |
| 1890 | 2,430 | 0 | 3 |
| 1891 | 2,537 | 0 | 3 |
| 1892 | 2,351 | 0 | 4 |
| 1893 | 2,133 | 0 | 5 |
| 1894 | 2,352 | 0 | 4 |
| 1895 | 2,832 | 0 | 4 |
| 1896 | 2,699 | 23 | 4 |
| 1897 | 2,767 | 49 | 4 |
| 1898 | 3,643 | 64 | 5 |
| 1899 | 4,019 | 37 | 5 |
| 1900 | 3,949 | 30 | 5 |
| 1901 | | | |
| 1902 | 6,121 | 46 | 7 |
| 1903 | 6,935 | 37 | 6 |
| 1904 | 7,626 | 36 | 6 |
| 1905 | 8,449 | 50 | 6 |
| 1906 | 8,587 | 94 | 7 |
| 1907 | 9,180 | 57 | 6 |
| 1908 | 11,168 | 45 | 7 |
| 1909 | 11,827 | 54 | 7 |
| 1910 | 14,759 | 54 | 8 |
| 1911 | 16,121 | 76 | 9 |
| 1912 | 17,396 | 83 | 9 |
| 1913 | 18,463 | 37 | 11 |
| 1914 | 20,343 | 40 | |
| 1915 | 23,642 | 42 | |
| 1916 | 24,392 | 49 | |
| 1917 | 33,446 | 51 | |
| 1918 | 36,993 | 1,168 | |
| 1919 | 37,117 | 4,583 | |
| 1920 | 40,971 | 6,295 | |
| 1921 | 46,094 | 7,007 | |
| 1922 | 51,400 | 8,111 | |
| 1923 | 55,492 | 8,727 | |
| 1924 | 57,979 | 9,724 | |
| 1925 | 56,952 | 17,927 | |
| 1926 | 47,221 | 20,492 | |
| 1927 | 43,479 | 19,359 | |
| 1928 | 41,795 | 22,041 | |
| 1929 | 36,984 | 20,992 | |
| 1930 | 34,543 | 16,921 | |
| 1931 | 62,198 | 20,240 | |
| 1932 | 56,787 | 18,883 | |
| 1933 | 54,048 | 8,605 | |
| 1934 | 58,268 | 7,996 | |
| 1935 | 63,608 | 10,043 | |
| 1936 | 64,606 | 11,825 | |
| 1937 | 66,635 | 12,672 | |
| 1938 | 63,874 | 12,701 | |
| 1939 | 61,019 | 12,483 | |
| 1940 | 61,890 | 12,532 | |
| 1941 | 78,221 | 15,571 | |
| 1942 | 93,519 | 15,004 | |
| 1943 | 110,948 | 16,433 | |
| 1944 | 122,353 | 16,882 | |
| 1945 | 108,291 | 16,417 | |
| 1946 | 111,646 | 16,489 | |
| 1947 | 95,852 | 15,216 | |
| 1948 | 79,727 | 14,663 | |
| 1949 | 74,154 | 14,610 | |
| 1950 | 73,041 | 15,182 | |

=== Engine shed ===
By 1884 Huntly had a coal shed, 49 ft (15 m) turntable (though, in 1933 a 55 ft (17 m) turntable was moved from Huntly to Ohakune and in 1967 a 70 ft (21 m) turntable was moved to storage at Otahuhu Workshops), engine shed (extended by 38 ft (12 m) in 1915 for the Awaroa branch engine and which suffered several fires. By 1925 there were 13 staff and 3 locomotives at Huntly engine shed. Locomotives were transferred to Frankton in 1937 and the shed closed.

=== 1939 station ===
The new station opened on 28 May 1939, with stationmaster, waiting, porters and parcels rooms. A 55 lever electric frame operated the newly doubled lines and extended yard. The old station was demolished to allow a platform extension.

Freight was also growing. In 1919 the chief traffic manager reported that there was insufficient room and by 1924 the growth of coal mining had increased business a further 25%. A plan was made to enlarge the yard and move it south of the Awaroa Branch.

=== Closure and removal ===
In 1993 Huntly Lions Club repainted the station and the 1939 footbridge at the north end of the platform was moved to Helensville, though it couldn't be used, as too few parts survived for it to be safe. It had been raised to allow the SH1 bypass to be built in 1978. In 1971 a car park covered the site of the old goods shed on the west and in 1977 2 loops to the west of the station were removed to make way for the road by-pass.. Access was then only from Rayners Rd, where a bridge, with walkways to the main island platform and to the Awaroa Branch platform, had replaced a level crossing in 1957.

The Overlander continued to call at Huntly until 2005.

In 2008 the 1939 building was moved as part of plans to shift Waikato Coalfields Museum to Lake Puketirini (former Weavers opencast coal mine), the most vandalised park in the district. The museum plan was further discussed in 2017. In 2021 it was proposed that the building be moved back to the station for use as a museum and by Te Huia passengers. Half of the building was moved back. The other half was badly damaged by fire, but the buildings were back at the railway by July 2023.

== Reopening ==
Originally on an island platform between the up and down lines, the replacement station was on a siding, so trains travelled at "yard" speed, and northbound trains had to cross over the southbound track.

$960,000 was to be spent to renovate the station for the new Te Huia service, originally promised for 2019, then delayed to March 2020, then 3 August 2020 and, finally, Tuesday 6 April 2021.

The shelter and platform needed upgrading plus "park-and-ride" facilities and a pedestrian overbridge to the town centre. Expenditure was increased by $3,279,495 in 2019, to provide points and extend the single platform to 140 m (460 ft). By October 2020, the new shelter was largely complete, and the carpark was to be finished in November. Additional funding to complete the restoration after fire damage was approved in March 2024.

The indicative start-up service timetable provided for two peak hour services each way, but the 2023 timetable was slowed and in March 2024 was -

| Dep. Raahui Pookeka | Arr. The Strand | Dep. The Strand | Arr. Raahui Pookeka | Dep. Raahui Pookeka | Arr. The Strand | Dep. The Strand | Arr. Raahui Pookeka |
| 6.36am | 8.45am | 9.39am | 11.37am | 8.06am | 10.11am | 3pm | 4.59pm (Sats) |
| 10.01am (Thu, Fri only) | 12.05pm | 3.20pm | 5.09pm (Thu, Fri only) | | | | |
| 2.36pm | 4.45pm | 5.35pm | 7.37pm | 9.31am | 11.32am | 5.30pm | 7.32pm (Sats) |

Huntly was named after Huntly in Aberdeenshire, Scotland.

== Gallery ==
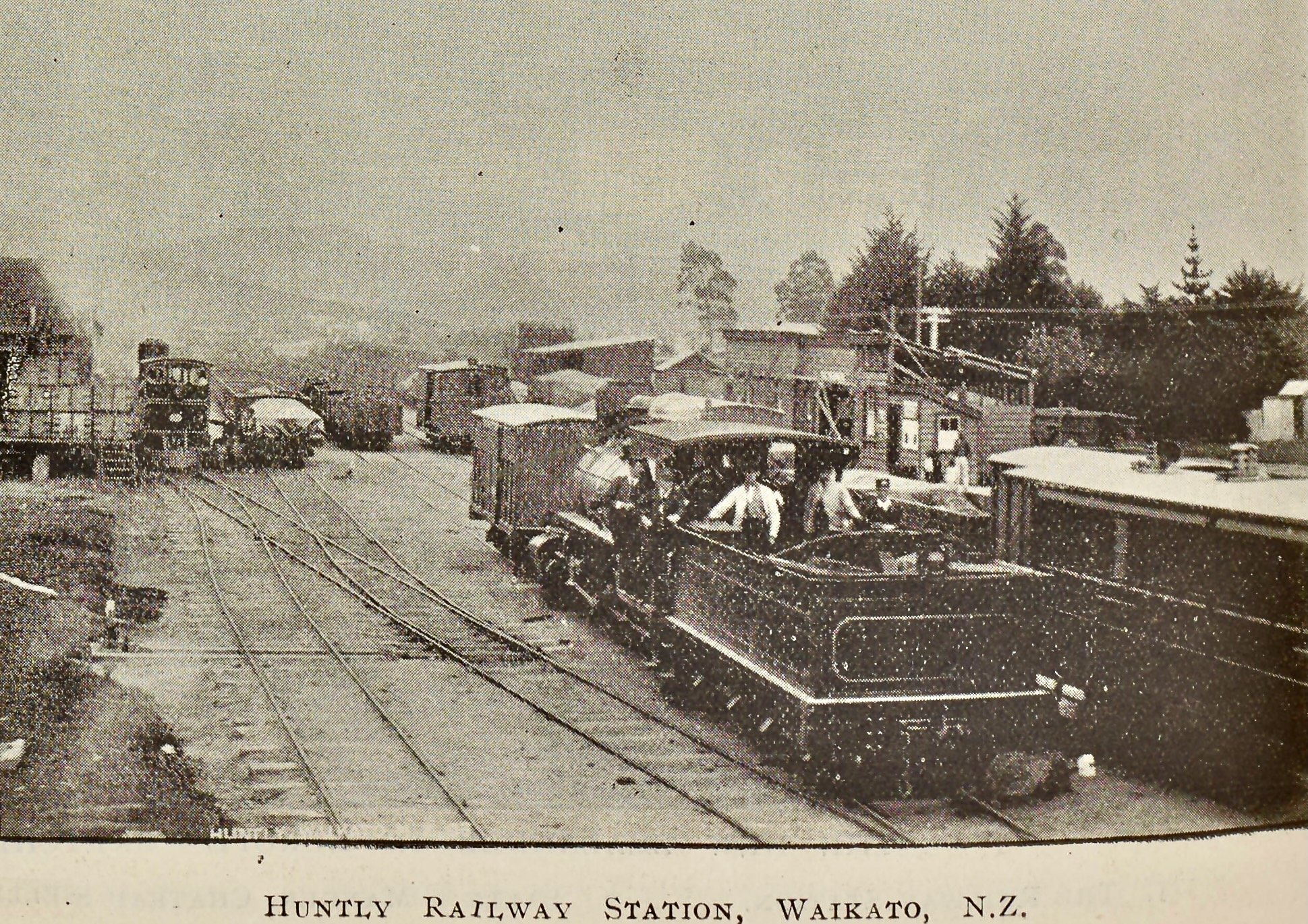
1895 NZR J Class and station

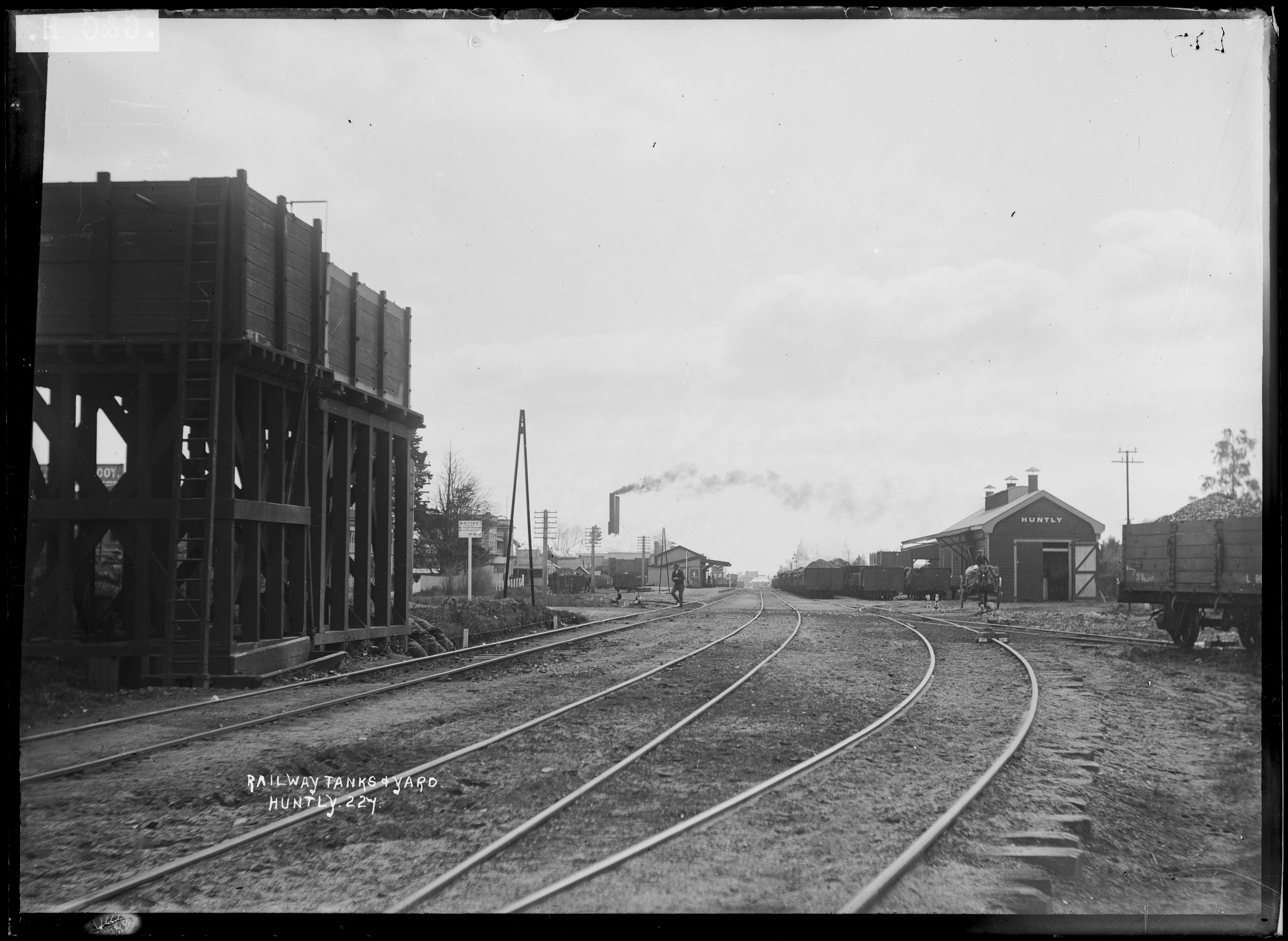
About 1910, station background centre

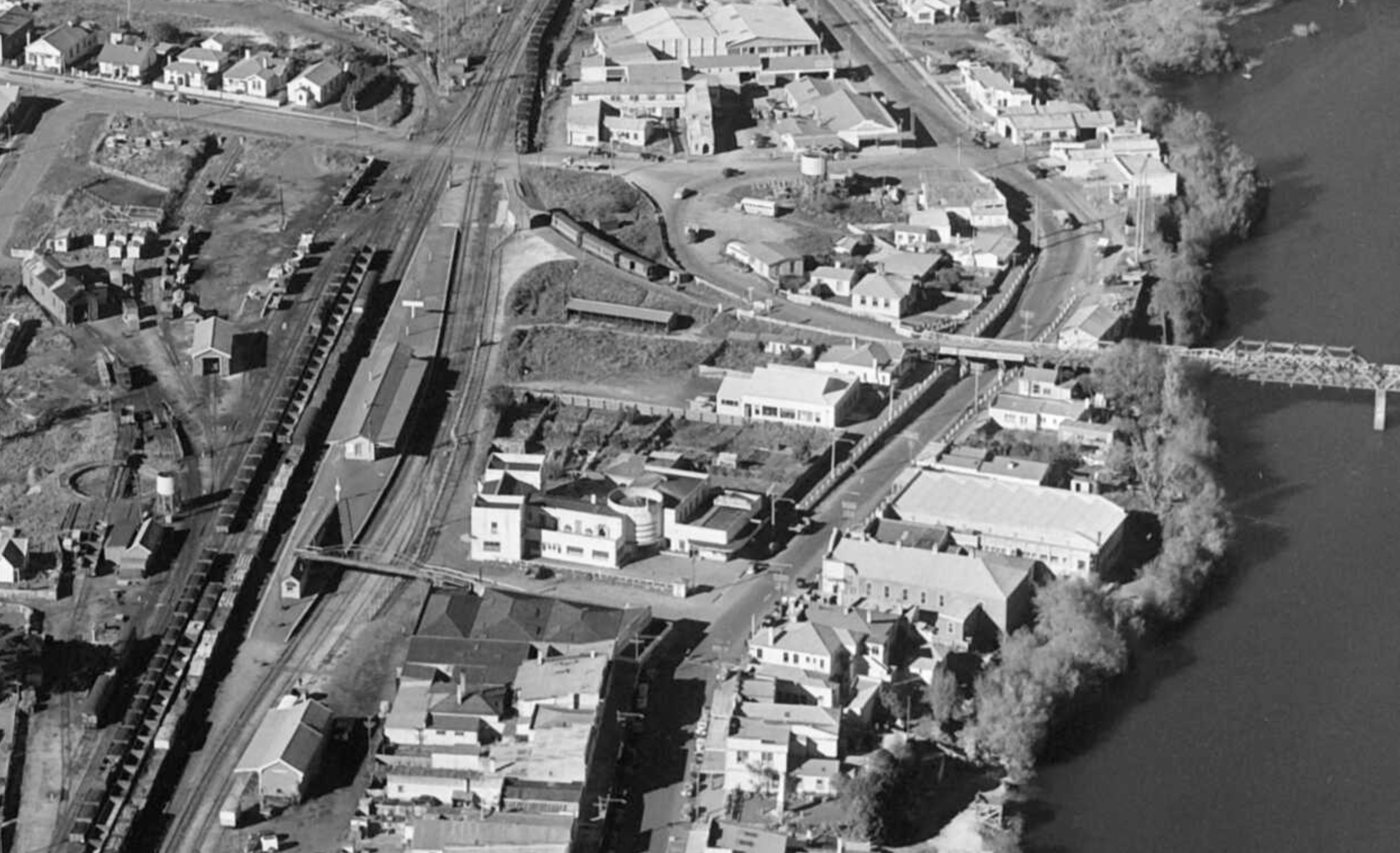
1951 Huntly with 1939 building and Huntly Town (1916–1969), Awaroa Branch stations

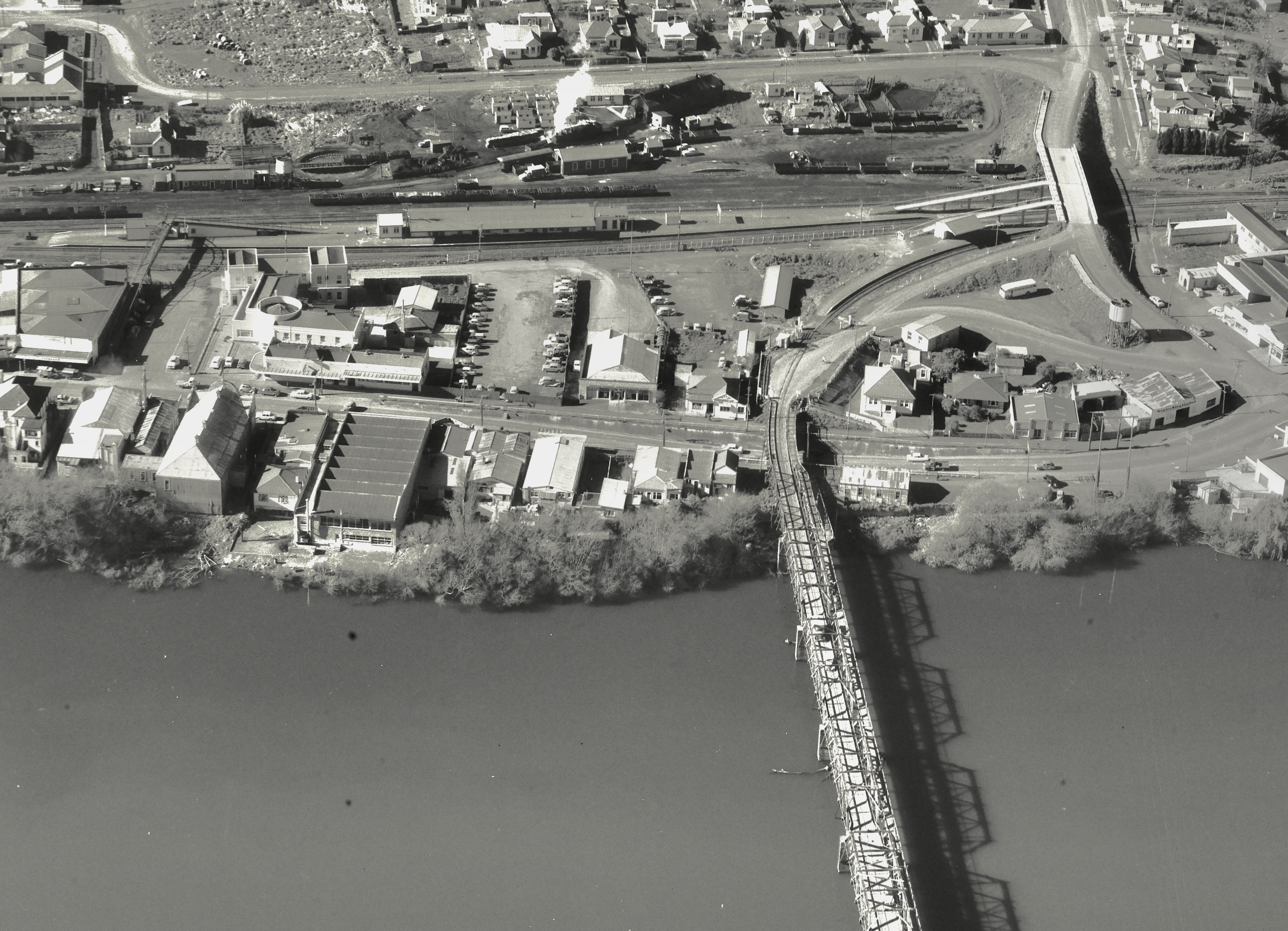
1959 with Rayner Rd bridge

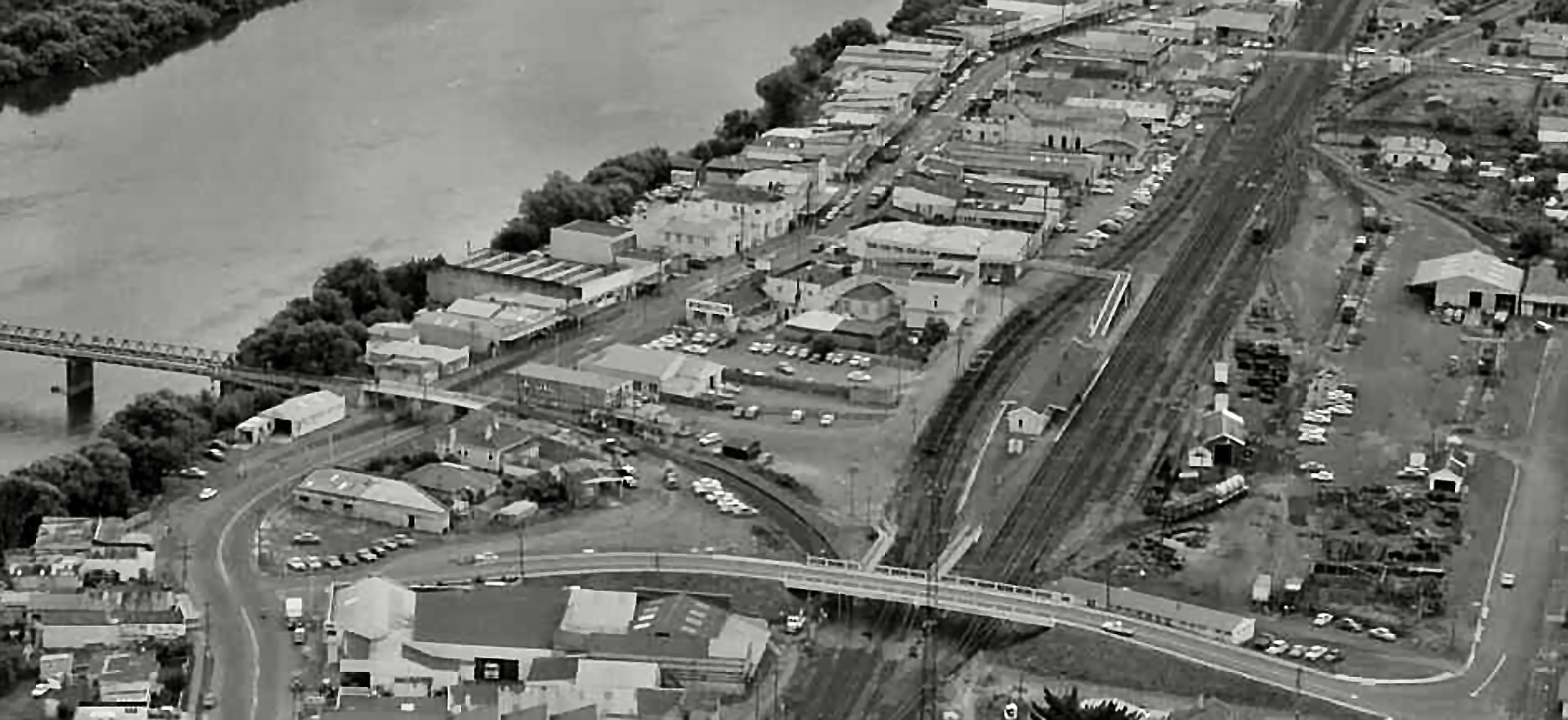
1972 without engine shed

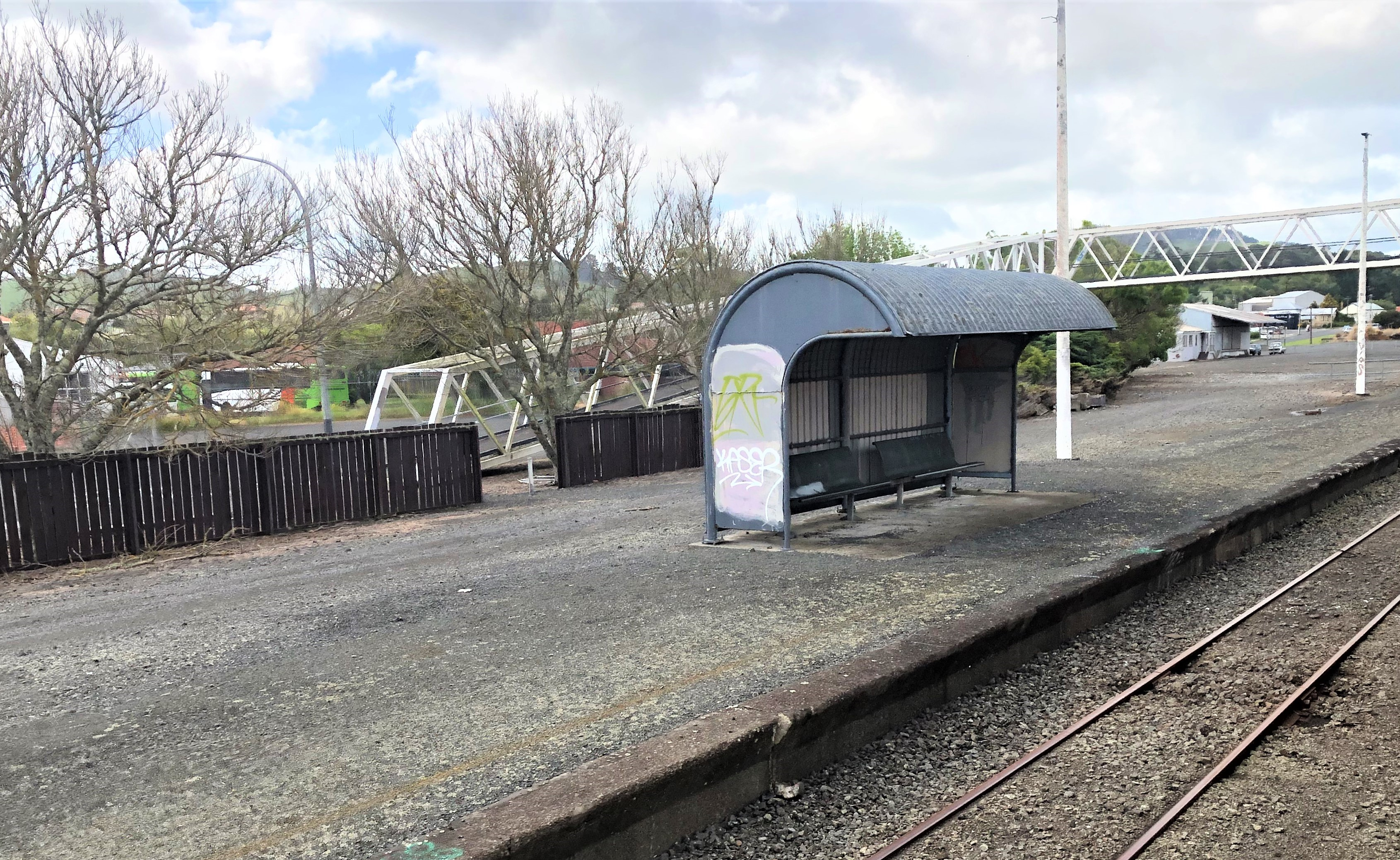
Huntly station shelter in 2019

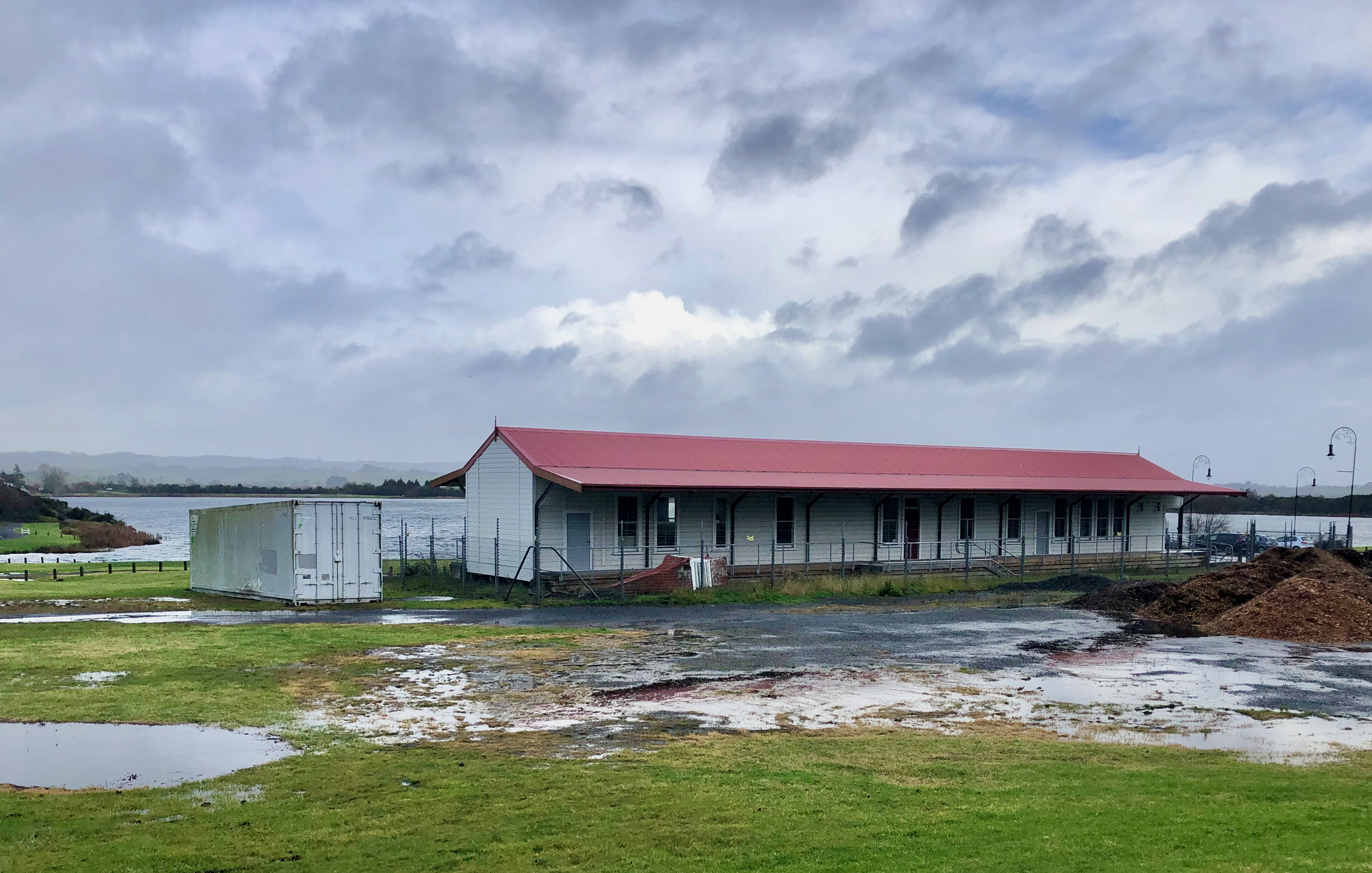
Huntly 1939 railway station at Lake Puketirini in 2020

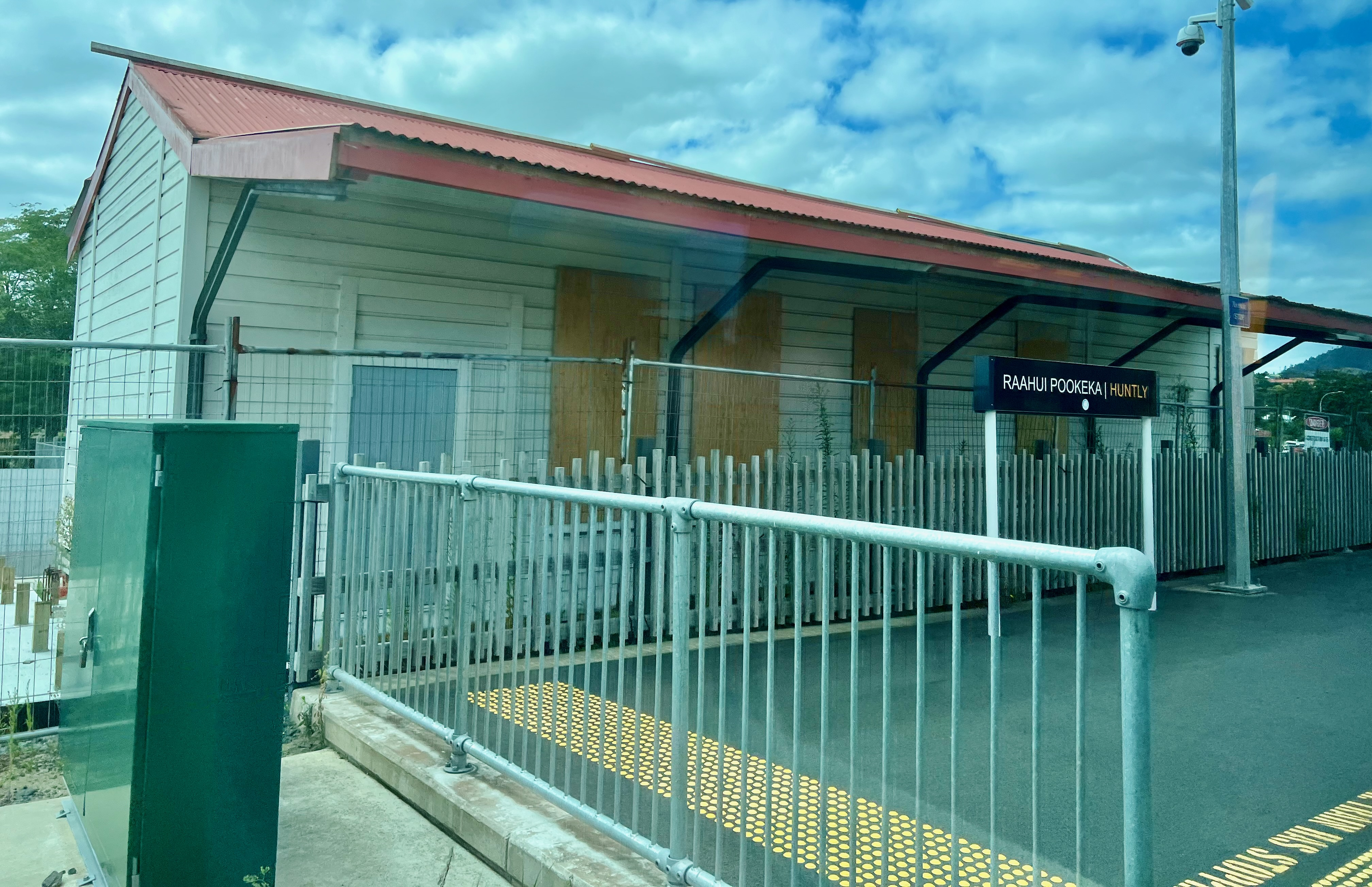
Partly restored Raahui Pookeka station in February 2024
