= Glen Afton Branch =

Branch railway line in Waikato, New Zealand

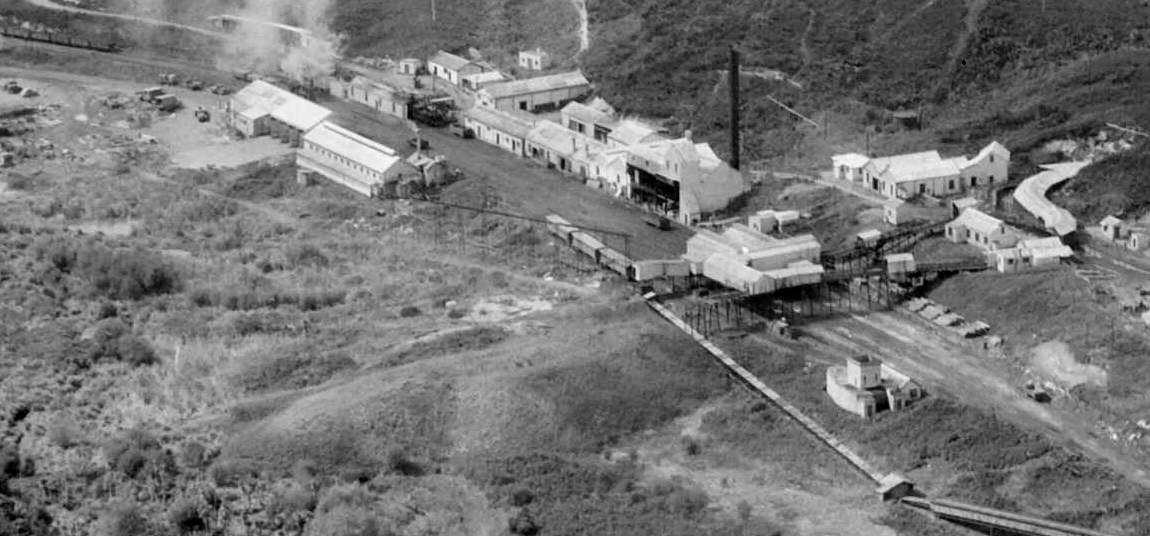
- 1955 Glen Afton, showing coal mining area, view to Pukemiro Collieries coal processing plant with railway in valley. Whites Aviation Ltd :Photographs. Ref: WA-38779-F. Alexander Turnbull Library, Wellington.

Overview
- Other names: Rotowaro Branch, Rotowaro Industrial Line, Awaroa Branch
- Status: Open
- Owner: KiwiRail
- Termini: Huntly; Glen Afton
- Stations: 7

Service
- Operator(s): KiwiRail
- Rolling stock: None

History
- Opened: 1911
- Extended to Pukemiro: 20 December 1915
- Extended to Glen Afton: 14 June 1924
- Closed beyond Rotowaro: 5 March 1973

Technical
- Line length: 7.97 km (4.95 mi)
- Number of tracks: Single
- Character: Rural
- Track gauge: 1,067 mm (3 ft 6 in)

Map

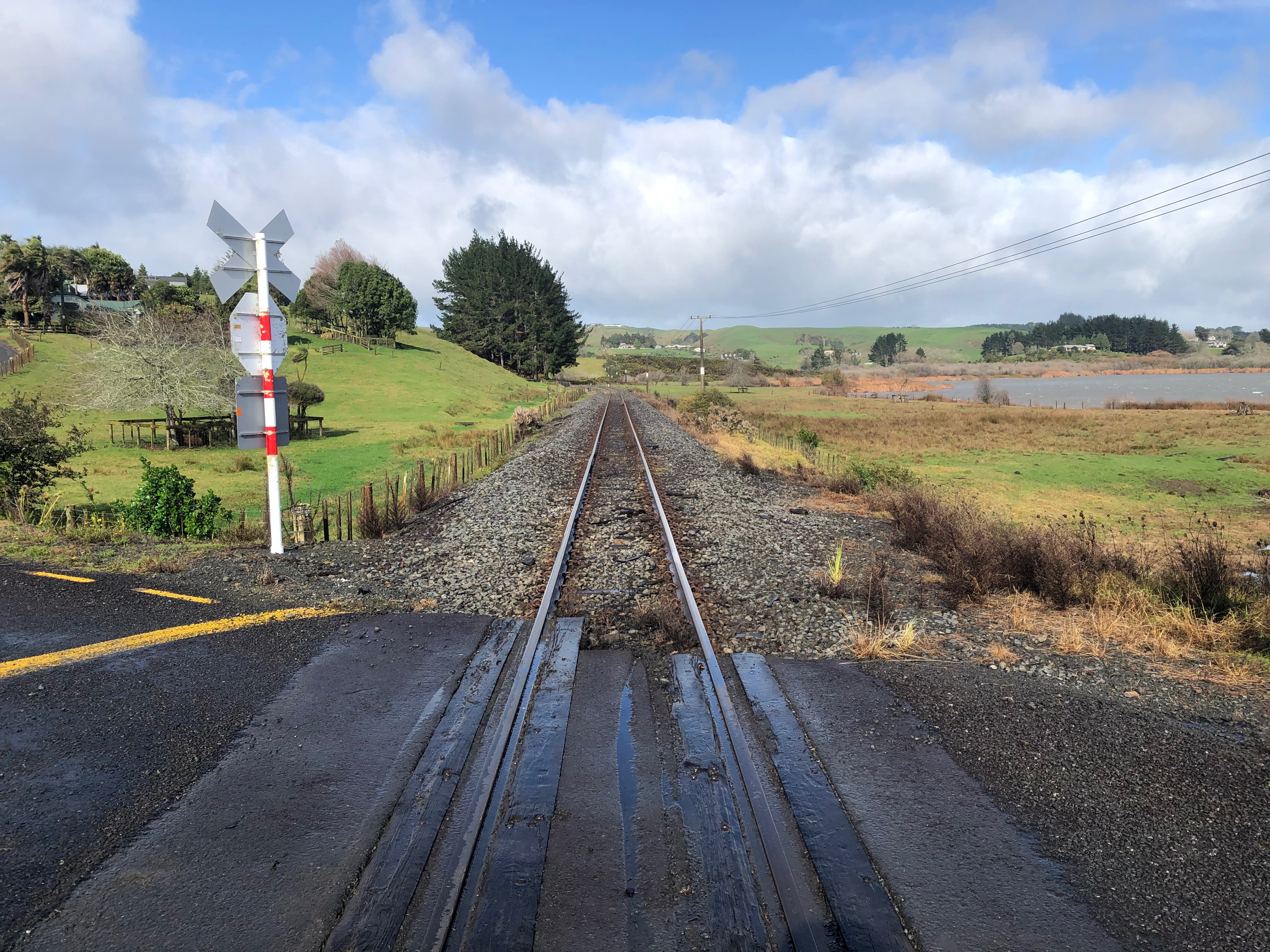
Weavers Crossing in 2020. The station was on the other side of the crossing

The Glen Afton Branch was a branch railway line of 7.9 km (originally 14.1 km) in the Waikato in New Zealand, built to serve coal mines in the Awaroa district west of Huntly at Rotowaro, Pukemiro and Glen Afton. Rotowaro is Māori for "coal lake".

When handed over from Public Works to NZR in 1915 it was called the Awaroa Branch, but was also known as the Glen Afton Branch to about 1974, then as the Rotowaro Branch to 3 November 1988, then as the Rotowaro Industrial Line. By 2014 it was again named the Rotowaro Branch.

== History ==
The first 5 km was authorised in 1910 and required a road-rail bridge over the Waikato River, with an extension which carried the railway over the main highway. The bridge, constructed from 1911 to October 1914, had 10 spans of Australian hardwood (8 of 30.5m and 2 of 12.2m) on steel and reinforced concrete piers. The nearby Wilton Collieries Co complained that they too did not have public money put into building their line and river bridge. The first 5 km of track opened about 1911, and this is confirmed by a 1914 report saying the Huntly-Awaroa line is complete over the first 3 mi (4.8 km) section, "well advanced" by co-operative labour over the next 2 1/2 mi (4.0 km) and "fair progress" with 5 small contracts to a proposed station 7 1/4 mi (11.7 km) from Huntly, "where coal from the Pukemiro collieries will be delivered for transport. An addition is being made to the combined bridge over the Waikato river to carry it over the Main South road. It is hoped by the end of the ensuing summer to have the rails laid to the junction with the Pukemiro collieries line. As the works now in hand draw to a close, it is proposed to continue operations on this line in the direction of the Burnt bridge. The expenditure upon the railway and bridge during last financial year amounted to £16,503, and for the current year a vote of £30,000 is proposed." In 2015 prices £46,503 would be equivalent to $6.8m.

New Zealand Co-operative Dairy Company started mining at Glen Afton in 1921. The 2.5 km extension from Rotowaro to Pukemiro and Glen Afton was built between 1921 and 1924, although a further proposed extension beyond Glen Afton did not proceed. The hill section from Rotowaro to Glen Afton was difficult to construct, with a large "summit" cutting just before Glen Afton. Grades on the hill section were up to 1 in 50, with 150m (7.5 chain) radius curves. At the same time as the extension, tablet signalling was introduced between Huntly and Glen Afton.

There were several short private lines to mines at Rotowaro, Pukemiro and Glen Afton. In 1928 the line was operated by W^{W} class locomotives, carrying about 350 miners a day and monthly coal outputs of 11,000 tons at Rotowaro, 15,000 at Pukemiro and 12,000 at Glen Afton, as well as bringing in supplies such as pit props.

A bridge near Mahuta was damaged by dynamite during the 1951 Waterfront dispute.

In November 1959 a separate road bridge was opened. The Rotowaro to Glen Afton section west of Rotowaro was closed from 5 March 1973, as the mines had run out of coal. The line was shortened from 14.10 km to 7.97 km.

=== Renown Collieries tramway ===
Renown Collieries Siding was 4 mi 50 ch (7.4 km) from Huntly, now the end of the line. A 2ft gauge endless-rope tramway ran northwest in an almost straight line for about 5km. It was built in 1927 and 1928 and included 3 viaducts, one 10 chains (200 m) long and 40 feet (12 m) high and 4 tunnels of 4 chains (80 m), 6 chains (120 m), 7 chains (140 m) and 8 chains (160 m). Coal was carried in 4, or 8-wheeled tubs.

== Traffic ==
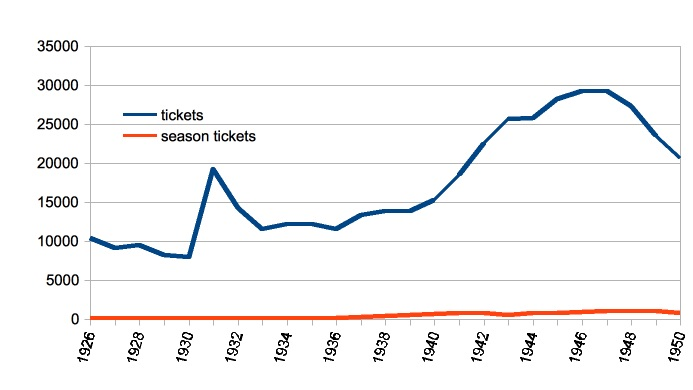
Glen Afton station tickets sales 1926–1950 – derived from annual returns to Parliament of "Statement of Revenue for each Station for the Year ended"

Passenger traffic reached a peak in 1947, as shown in the graph and table below -

year	tickets	season tickets	staff	source	title
1926	10,349	33		https://paperspast.natlib.govt.nz/parliamentary/appendix-to-the-journals-of-the-house-of-representatives/1926/I/1930	STATEMENT No. 18 Statement of Traffic and Revenue for each Station for the Year ended 31 March 1926
1927	9,064	43		https://paperspast.natlib.govt.nz/parliamentary/appendix-to-the-journals-of-the-house-of-representatives/1927/I/2230	STATEMENT No. 18 Statement of Traffic and Revenue for each Station for the Year ended 31 March 1927
1928	9,446	54		https://paperspast.natlib.govt.nz/parliamentary/appendix-to-the-journals-of-the-house-of-representatives/1928/I/2628	STATEMENT No. 18 Statement of Traffic and Revenue for each Station for the Year ended 31 March 1928
1929	8,124	54		https://paperspast.natlib.govt.nz/parliamentary/appendix-to-the-journals-of-the-house-of-representatives/1929/I/2090	STATEMENT No. 18 Statement of Traffic and Revenue for each Station for the Year ended 31 March 1929
1930	7,924	70		https://paperspast.natlib.govt.nz/parliamentary/appendix-to-the-journals-of-the-house-of-representatives/1930/I/2212	STATEMENT No. 18 Statement of Traffic and Revenue for each Station for the Year ended 31 March 1930
1931	19,149	61		https://paperspast.natlib.govt.nz/parliamentary/appendix-to-the-journals-of-the-house-of-representatives/1931/I-II/1778	STATEMENT No. 18 Statement of Traffic and Revenue for each Station for the Year ended 31 March 1931
1932	14,205	45		https://paperspast.natlib.govt.nz/parliamentary/appendix-to-the-journals-of-the-house-of-representatives/1932/I-II/1934	STATEMENT No. 18 Statement of Traffic and Revenue for each Station for the Year ended 31 March 1932
1933	11,475	58		https://paperspast.natlib.govt.nz/parliamentary/appendix-to-the-journals-of-the-house-of-representatives/1933/I/1388	STATEMENT No. 18 Statement of Traffic and Revenue for each Station for the Year ended 31 March 1933
1934	12,131	47		https://paperspast.natlib.govt.nz/parliamentary/appendix-to-the-journals-of-the-house-of-representatives/1934/I/2278	STATEMENT No. 18 Statement of Traffic and Revenue for each Station for the Year ended 31 March 1934
1935	12,101	72		https://paperspast.natlib.govt.nz/parliamentary/appendix-to-the-journals-of-the-house-of-representatives/1935/I/1326	STATEMENT No. 18 Statement of Traffic and Revenue for each Station for the Year ended 31 March 1935
1936	11,519	31		https://paperspast.natlib.govt.nz/parliamentary/appendix-to-the-journals-of-the-house-of-representatives/1936/I/1552	STATEMENT No. 18 Statement of Traffic and Revenue for each Station for the Year ended 31 March 1936
1937	13,280	160		https://paperspast.natlib.govt.nz/parliamentary/appendix-to-the-journals-of-the-house-of-representatives/1937/I/1896	STATEMENT No. 18 Statement of Traffic and Revenue for each Station for the Year ended 31 March 1937
1938	13,783	295		https://paperspast.natlib.govt.nz/parliamentary/appendix-to-the-journals-of-the-house-of-representatives/1938/I/1652	STATEMENT No. 18 Statement of Traffic and Revenue for each Station for the Year ended 31 March 1938
1939	13,829	446		https://paperspast.natlib.govt.nz/parliamentary/appendix-to-the-journals-of-the-house-of-representatives/1939/I/1970	STATEMENT No. 18 Statement of Traffic and Revenue for each Station for the Year ended 31 March 1939
1940	15,244	567		https://paperspast.natlib.govt.nz/parliamentary/appendix-to-the-journals-of-the-house-of-representatives/1940/I/1314	STATEMENT No. 18 Statement of Traffic and Revenue for each Station for the Year ended 31 March 1940
1941	18,425	789		https://paperspast.natlib.govt.nz/parliamentary/appendix-to-the-journals-of-the-house-of-representatives/1941/I/1203	STATEMENT No. 18 Statement of Traffic and Revenue for each Station for the Year ended 31 March 1941
1942	22,561	712		https://paperspast.natlib.govt.nz/parliamentary/appendix-to-the-journals-of-the-house-of-representatives/1942/I/651	STATEMENT No. 18 Statement of Traffic and Revenue for each Station for the Year ended 31 March 1942
1943	25,569	504		https://paperspast.natlib.govt.nz/parliamentary/appendix-to-the-journals-of-the-house-of-representatives/1943/I/679	STATEMENT No. 18 Statement of Traffic and Revenue for each Station for the Year ended 31 March 1943
1944	25,656	699		https://paperspast.natlib.govt.nz/parliamentary/appendix-to-the-journals-of-the-house-of-representatives/1944/I/895	STATEMENT No. 18 Statement of Traffic and Revenue for each Station for the Year ended 31 March 1944
1945	28,118	737		https://paperspast.natlib.govt.nz/parliamentary/appendix-to-the-journals-of-the-house-of-representatives/1945/I/969	STATEMENT No. 18 Statement of Traffic and Revenue for each Station for the Year ended 31 March 1945
1946	29,117	906		https://paperspast.natlib.govt.nz/parliamentary/appendix-to-the-journals-of-the-house-of-representatives/1946/I/1548	STATEMENT No. 18 Statement of Traffic and Revenue for each Station for the Year ended 31 March 1946
1947	29,184	996		https://paperspast.natlib.govt.nz/parliamentary/appendix-to-the-journals-of-the-house-of-representatives/1947/I/2495	STATEMENT No. 18 Statement of Traffic and Revenue for each Station for the Year ended 31 March 1947
1948	27,236	987		https://paperspast.natlib.govt.nz/parliamentary/appendix-to-the-journals-of-the-house-of-representatives/1948/I/2521	STATEMENT No. 18 Statement of Traffic and Revenue for each Station for the Year ended 31 March 1948
1949	23,473	1,017		https://paperspast.natlib.govt.nz/parliamentary/appendix-to-the-journals-of-the-house-of-representatives/1949/I/2104	STATEMENT No. 18 Statement of Traffic and Revenue for each Station for the Year ended 31 March 1949
1950	20,555	698		https://paperspast.natlib.govt.nz/parliamentary/appendix-to-the-journals-of-the-house-of-representatives/1950/I/2366	STATEMENT No. 18 Statement of Traffic and Revenue for each Station for the Year ended 31 March 1950

== Motive power ==
The branch line was dieselised in 1966, with a special New Zealand Railway and Locomotive Society excursion train on 12 March 1966 to mark the change, hauled by two B^{B} class steam locomotives. Passenger trains, mainly for miners, ran to 23 June 1972, apart from a special train for railway enthusiasts on 16 December 1972 hauled by a D^{I} class diesel locomotive. A 1935 schedule allowed 45 minutes for the 8 mi 78 ch (14.4 km) all stations trip from Huntly to Glen Afton.

== Preservation ==
From 1977 the section to Rotowaro, Pukemiro and Glen Afton was handed over to the Bush Tramway Club who operate over about 5 km of former NZR line, though the last 2.5 km to Glen Afton is no longer usable. Rotowaro station has been moved to the Bush Tramway Club.

== See also ==
- North Island Main Trunk
- Cambridge Branch
- Glen Massey Line
- Kimihia Branch
- Kinleith Branch
- Rotorua Branch
- Thames Branch
