= Huntly, New Zealand =

Town in Waikato, New Zealand

Huntly Rāhui-Pōkeka (Māori)
- Minor urban area
- Waikato River, Huntly and Huntly power station from Hakarimatas in 2012
- Interactive map of Huntly
- Coordinates: 37°33.5′S 175°9.5′E
- Country: New Zealand
- Region: Waikato
- District: Waikato District
- Ward: Huntly General Ward
- Community: Huntly Community
- Electorates: Waikato; Hauraki-Waikato (Māori)

Government
  - Territorial Authority: Waikato District Council
  - Regional council: Waikato Regional Council
  - Mayor of Waikato: Aksel Bech
  - Waikato MP: Tim van de Molen
  - Hauraki-Waikato MP: Hana-Rawhiti Maipi-Clarke

Area
  - Total: 16.57 km^{2} (6.40 sq mi)
- Elevation: 15 m (49 ft)

Population (June 2025)
  - Total: 8,550
  - Density: 516/km^{2} (1,340/sq mi)
- Postcode(s): 3700

Huntly (Māori: Rāhui-Pōkeka) is a New Zealand town with a population of 8,550. It straddles the Waikato River, and is within the Waikato District in the northern part of the Waikato region local government area.

Huntly is 95 kilometres (59 mi) south of Auckland and 32 kilometres (20 mi) north of Hamilton, and was on State Highway 1 until the Huntly bypass opened in March 2020. It is situated on the North Island Main Trunk (NIMT) railway (served by Te Huia since 6 April 2021 at a rebuilt Raahui Pookeka-Huntly Station).

== History and culture ==
Originally settled by Māori, European migrants arrived in the area some time in the 1850s. The Huntly name was adopted in the 1870s when the postmaster named it after Huntly, Aberdeenshire, in Scotland. He used an old 'Huntley Lodge' stamp to stamp mail from the early European settlement. The word Lodge was later dropped and the spelling changed to also drop the additional 'e'.

The railway from Auckland reached Huntly in 1877, when the Huntly railway station was opened.

Huntly and its surrounding area is steeped in Māori history and falls within the rohe (tribal area) of Waikato-Tainui of the Tainui waka confederation. Ngāti Mahuta and Ngāti Whawhakia are the subtribes in the Huntly area. Waahi Pa in Huntly was the home of the Māori queen Dame Te Atairangikaahu and of her son the Māori king Tūheitia.

Rakaumanga Native School was established in 1896. It was moved to its present site in 1974 to make way for the building of Huntly Power Station. It became one of the first bilingual schools (Māori/English) in New Zealand in 1984. It became a kura kaupapa (total immersion, Māori as its first language) in 1994 and is now known by the name Te Whare Kura o Rakaumangamanga.

=== Marae ===
There are a number of marae in and around Huntly, affiliated with the Ngāti Kuiaarangi, Ngāti Mahuta, Ngāti Tai and Ngāti Whāwhākia hapū: Kaitumutumu Marae and Ruateatea meeting house, Te Kauri Marae and Karaka meeting house, Te Ōhākī Marae and Te Ōhākī a Te Puea meeting house, and Waahi Pa and Tāne i te Pupuke meeting house.

In October 2020, the Government committed $2,584,751 from the Provincial Growth Fund to upgrade Waahoi Marae and 7 other Waikato Tainui marae, creating 40 jobs.

Horahora Marae and Maurea Marae are located north of Huntly at Rangiriri.

== Demographics ==
Huntly covers 16.57 km^{2} (6.40 sq mi) and had an estimated population of 8,550 as of June 2025, with a population density of 516 people per km^{2}.

Historical population for Huntly
Year	Pop.	±% p.a.
1896	844	—
1901	622	−5.92%
1906	850	+6.45%
1911	1,319	+9.19%
1916	1,535	+3.08%
1921	1,734	+2.47%
1926	1,745	+0.13%
1936	1,976	+1.25%
1945	2,870	+4.23%
1956	4,187	+3.49%
1966	5,401	+2.58%
1976	6,279	+1.52%
1981	7,158	+2.66%
1986	7,464	+0.84%
1991	7,152	−0.85%
1996	7,068	−0.24%
2001	6,819	−0.71%
2006	6,756	−0.19%
2013	6,897	+0.30%
2018	7,947	+2.87%
2023	8,232	+0.71%
The 2006 population is for a smaller area of 14.56 km^{2}. Earlier populations may be for different boundaries. Source:

Huntly had a population of 8,232 in the 2023 New Zealand census, an increase of 285 people (3.6%) since the 2018 census, and an increase of 1,335 people (19.4%) since the 2013 census. There were 4,098 males, 4,104 females and 27 people of other genders in 2,649 dwellings. 2.7% of people identified as LGBTIQ+. The median age was 34.4 years (compared with 38.1 years nationally). There were 1,956 people (23.8%) aged under 15 years, 1,650 (20.0%) aged 15 to 29, 3,450 (41.9%) aged 30 to 64, and 1,179 (14.3%) aged 65 or older.

People could identify as more than one ethnicity. The results were 51.0% European (Pākehā); 53.5% Māori; 11.8% Pasifika; 7.3% Asian; 0.7% Middle Eastern, Latin American and African New Zealanders (MELAA); and 1.8% other, which includes people giving their ethnicity as "New Zealander". English was spoken by 95.3%, Māori language by 18.5%, Samoan by 0.9%, and other languages by 7.4%. No language could be spoken by 2.6% (e.g. too young to talk). New Zealand Sign Language was known by 0.9%. The percentage of people born overseas was 13.7, compared with 28.8% nationally.

Religious affiliations were 28.5% Christian, 1.7% Hindu, 0.9% Islam, 4.5% Māori religious beliefs, 0.4% Buddhist, 0.5% New Age, 0.1% Jewish, and 0.7% other religions. People who answered that they had no religion were 55.5%, and 7.9% of people did not answer the census question.

Of those at least 15 years old, 654 (10.4%) people had a bachelor's or higher degree, 3,486 (55.5%) had a post-high school certificate or diploma, and 2,136 (34.0%) people exclusively held high school qualifications. The median income was $34,000, compared with $41,500 nationally. 309 people (4.9%) earned over $100,000 compared to 12.1% nationally. The employment status of those at least 15 was that 2,889 (46.0%) people were employed full-time, 624 (9.9%) were part-time, and 315 (5.0%) were unemployed.

Individual statistical areas
Name	Area (km^{2})	Population	Density (per km^{2})	Dwellings	Median age	Median income
Huntly West	5.75	3,192	555	945	30.5 years	$32,400
Huntly East	6.79	3,474	512	1,131	35.9 years	$35,400
Huntly South	4.03	1,566	389	573	39.9 years	$34,700
New Zealand					38.1 years	$41,500

=== Huntly Rural ===
The statistical area of Huntly Rural, which includes Ohinewai, Ruawaro and Glen Afton, covers 351.21 km^{2} (135.60 sq mi) and had an estimated population of 2,330 as of June 2025, with a population density of 6.6 people per km^{2}.

Historical population for Huntly Rural
Year	Pop.	±% p.a.
2006	2,145	—
2013	2,052	−0.63%
2018	2,229	+1.67%
2023	2,277	+0.43%
The 2006 population is for a larger area of 353.23 km^{2}. Source:

Huntly Rural had a population of 2,277 in the 2023 New Zealand census, an increase of 48 people (2.2%) since the 2018 census, and an increase of 225 people (11.0%) since the 2013 census. There were 1,209 males, 1,065 females and 3 people of other genders in 870 dwellings. 1.8% of people identified as LGBTIQ+. The median age was 40.9 years (compared with 38.1 years nationally). There were 432 people (19.0%) aged under 15 years, 375 (16.5%) aged 15 to 29, 1,095 (48.1%) aged 30 to 64, and 375 (16.5%) aged 65 or older.

People could identify as more than one ethnicity. The results were 78.4% European (Pākehā); 30.0% Māori; 4.0% Pasifika; 4.3% Asian; 0.4% Middle Eastern, Latin American and African New Zealanders (MELAA); and 2.6% other, which includes people giving their ethnicity as "New Zealander". English was spoken by 97.1%, Māori language by 9.0%, Samoan by 0.3%, and other languages by 5.4%. No language could be spoken by 2.1% (e.g. too young to talk). New Zealand Sign Language was known by 0.4%. The percentage of people born overseas was 11.6, compared with 28.8% nationally.

Religious affiliations were 24.2% Christian, 0.3% Hindu, 0.1% Islam, 2.0% Māori religious beliefs, 0.8% Buddhist, 0.5% New Age, and 1.8% other religions. People who answered that they had no religion were 62.3%, and 8.2% of people did not answer the census question.

Of those at least 15 years old, 216 (11.7%) people had a bachelor's or higher degree, 1,068 (57.9%) had a post-high school certificate or diploma, and 561 (30.4%) people exclusively held high school qualifications. The median income was $39,600, compared with $41,500 nationally. 165 people (8.9%) earned over $100,000 compared to 12.1% nationally. The employment status of those at least 15 was that 960 (52.0%) people were employed full-time, 267 (14.5%) were part-time, and 57 (3.1%) were unemployed.

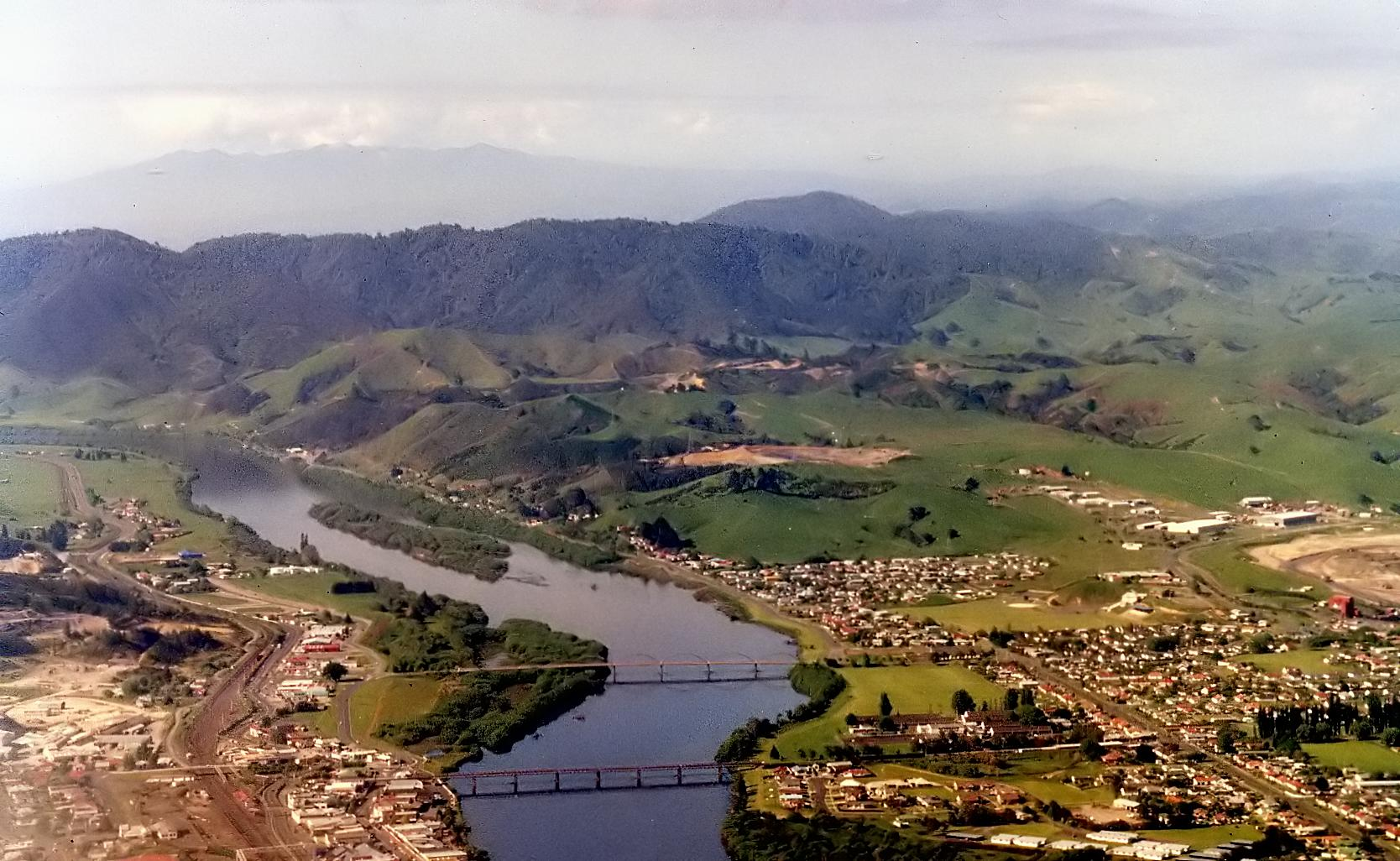
The south end of Huntly, showing parts of the open-pit mining typical of the area

== Major industries ==
Huntly Power Station is a large gas/coal-fired power station, prominently situated on the western bank of the Waikato River. It is New Zealand's largest thermal power station, situated in the area which is New Zealand's largest producer of coal, producing over 10,000 tonnes a day.

Huntly is also surrounded by farmland and lakes (many of them former open-pit mines) which are used for coarse fishing, yachting and waterskiing.

=== Coal ===
The Waikato coalfield is formed of 30 -35m year old Eocene-Oligocene rocks. The lowest coal measures are the Taupiri Seams, worked at Rotowaro, the upper Kupakupa and Renown Seams having been largely worked out.

The area has a very long history of coal mining, with both open cast and classical mines operating or having operated here. The major New Zealand clients for the mined coal are the power station and the New Zealand Steel mill at Glenbrook.

The first coal to be mined was half a ton at Taupiri in 1849, followed by 32 tons in 1850, opposite Kupa Kupa, about 5 km (3.1 mi) south of Huntly, and coal was also discovered at Papahorohoro, near Taupiri. However, it wasn't being exploited when the geologist, Ferdinand von Hochstetter, visited it in 1859. It was used to fuel steamers during the 1863 invasion of the Waikato. Kupakupa mine was started in 1864 and produced 11,000 tons by 1866. The area was confiscated in 1865. It was auctioned by government in 1867.

Taupiri Coal Co was producing 1,300 tons a month by 1879, up from 5,300 tons a year in 1878. A mine across the river from Kupakupa was opened in 1879.

On 12 September 1914 at the Ralph Mine in Huntly, a naked light caused an explosion that killed 43 coal miners.

After the Pukemiro railway opened in 1915, mines opened at Pukemiro, Glen Afton, Rotowaro, Waikōkōwai and Renown. Open cast mining began west of Huntly during World War 2, and later an opencast mine at Kimihia.

==== O'Reilly's Opencast Mine ====
This was the last mine operating in Huntly (off Riverview Rd), producing 24,708 tonnes in 2016. It was a privately owned mine, opened in 1957 and mainly selling to New Zealand Steel. It closed in 2018. Puke Mine and Rotowaro are the only mines still open in the Huntly area.

==== Huntly East Coalmine ====
Solid Energy closed this Huntly mine on 22 October 2015, saying it was losing $500,000 a month. It opened in 1978, produced a peak of 465,000 tonnes in 2004 and was digging about 450,000 tonnes a year until production was cut to 100,000 tonnes in September 2013. The mine entrance was in Huntly East, but by 2012 all mining was west of the Waikato, with roadways 150 metres below the river, the two 8 to 20 metre thick sub-bituminous seams being 150 to 400 metres deep. In 2012 it was estimated that 7 million tonnes of recoverable coal remained in the consented mining areas, with a further 12 million available for future expansion. Coal was mined by remote-controlled continuous miners and taken to the entrance in shuttle cars and then by conveyor belt. It continued to Glenbrook via the Kimihia branch railway and the NIMT. It employed about 200 in 2012, but was down to 68 at closure.

Kimihia Wetland was created on the former bed of Lake Kimihia to cope with subsidence and treat water from Huntly East Mine.

=== Bricks ===
Clay suited for bricks lies on top of some of the coal deposits. Brick making began in 1884, Huntly Brick and Fireclay was established in 1911 and Shinagawa Refractories continues on the site at the south end of the town. Nearby, Clay Bricks operate a brickworks.

== Rugby league ==
Huntly has a long history with its rugby leagues – at one time the town had four rugby league clubs: Taniwharau, Huntly South, Huntly United and Rangiriri Eels. Taniwharau has the most wins, having won 11 Waikato premierships during the 1970s and 1980s. Taniwharau also won the Waicoa Bay championship in 2002 and again in 2007. The Waicoa Bay championship is a combined rugby league competition involving clubs from Waikato, Bay of Plenty and Coastlines.

A number of New Zealand players have come out of Huntly including pre war player Len Mason who also, after the 1926 Kiwi tour of Great Britain finished his playing career at Wigan, playing a record 365 games in 9 years including a winning Challenge Cup final at Wembley in 1929. Post war players include Reg Cooke, Roger Tait, Tawera Nikau (Rangiriri) and, more recently, Wairangi Koopu (Taniwharau) and Lance Hohaia (Taniwharau). Other Kiwi players to come out of Huntly include Andy Berryman, Don Parkinson, Rick Muru, Kevin Fisher and Vaun O'Callaghan. The town has also produced numerous NZ Māori Rugby league representatives and two international referees, including Roland (Roly) Avery.

== Bridges ==
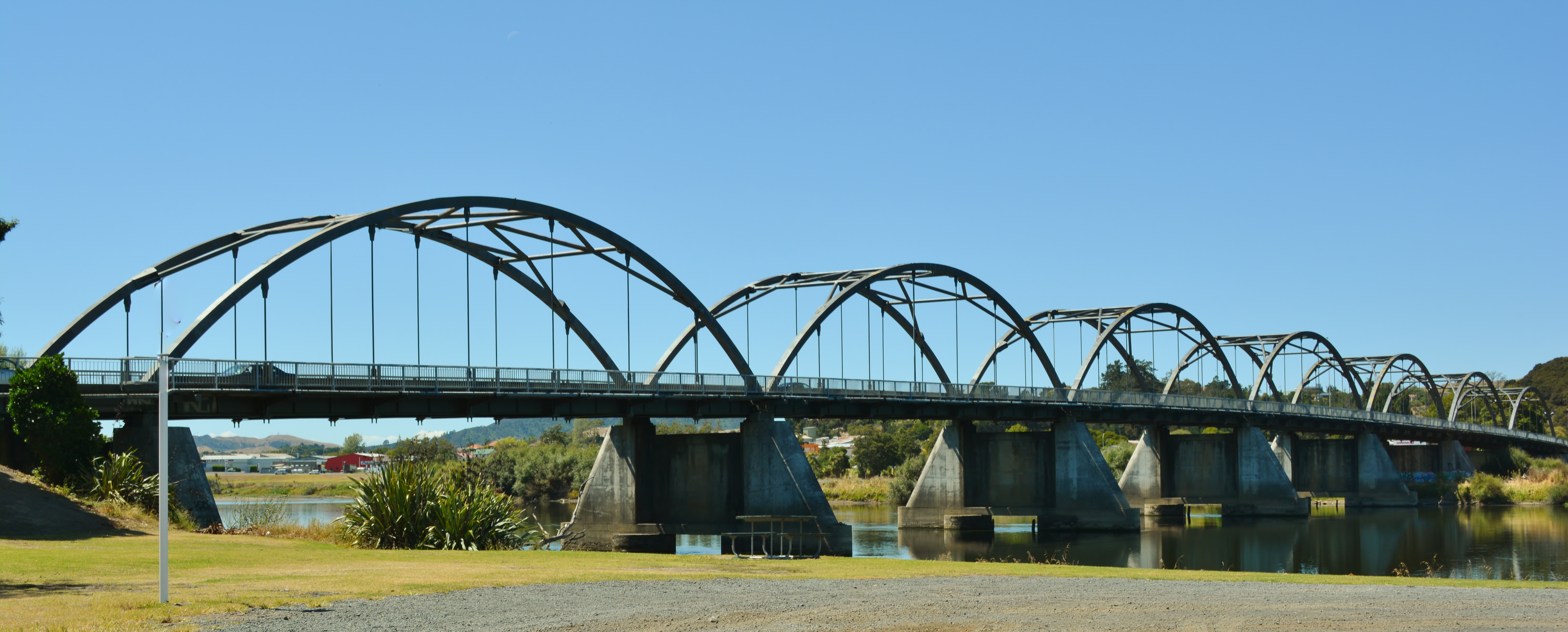
Tainui Bridge

Rail Bridge After a first pile driving ceremony in 1911, the punt (opened 18 September 1894) was replaced in 1915 by a road/rail bridge serving the Pukemiro railway.

Tainui Bridge is a 7-span bowstring-arch for road traffic opened in 1959, when the 1915 bridge became rail only, and a footbridge was attached to its side. Tainui Bridge was strengthened in 2005 to allow 500 tonne turbines to be carried to the Power Station, work which gained an award. Seismic strengthening was done in 2011. The bridge was repainted in 2016.

A footbridge across Shand Lane, the 1978 SH1 bypass and NIMT links Glasgow St with Main St. The 14-tonne central span was raised from 4.8 to 5.25m in 2010 to provide clearance for Te Uku construction trucks. It was also closed twice in 2015, firstly for repainting, then again when the arm of an excavator on a truck hit the bridge, requiring also temporary closure of SH1. Cameras and extra rails have been installed to improve safety, following stone throwing.

== Education ==
Huntly has five co-educational schools. The rolls given here are as of July 2026. Huntly College is a state secondary school covering years 9 to 13, with a roll of 200. The college was opened in 1953.

Huntly School and Huntly West School are state full primary schools covering years 1 to 8, with rolls of 186 and 115 respectively. Huntly School opened in 1879, and was rebuilt after a fire in 1906. Huntly West opened in 1856.

St Anthony's Catholic School is a state-integrated full primary school covering years 1 to 8, with a roll of 92. It opened in 1914.

Te Wharekura o Rākaumangamanga is a state composite school covering years 1 to 13. with a roll of 401. It provides a Māori language immersive education. It opened in 1896 as Te Wharekura o Rakaumanga, a native primary school, and became state-integrated in 1969. It moved to its present site in 1974. From 1979 a Māori language course was taught, and the school became officially bilingual in 1984. The school moved to total immersion in the Māori language between 1989 and 1992. It became a kura kaupapa Māori school in 1994, and added full secondary education in 1996.

The suburb of Kimihia also has a primary school, Kimihia School.

== In popular culture ==
Huntly features in the 2025 film A Minecraft Movie, where it stands in for the fictional town of Chuglass, Idaho.

== See also ==
- Lakes – Hakanoa, Kimihia, Puketirini, Waahi
- Railway stations – Huntly, Kimihia
