= Lake Hakanoa =

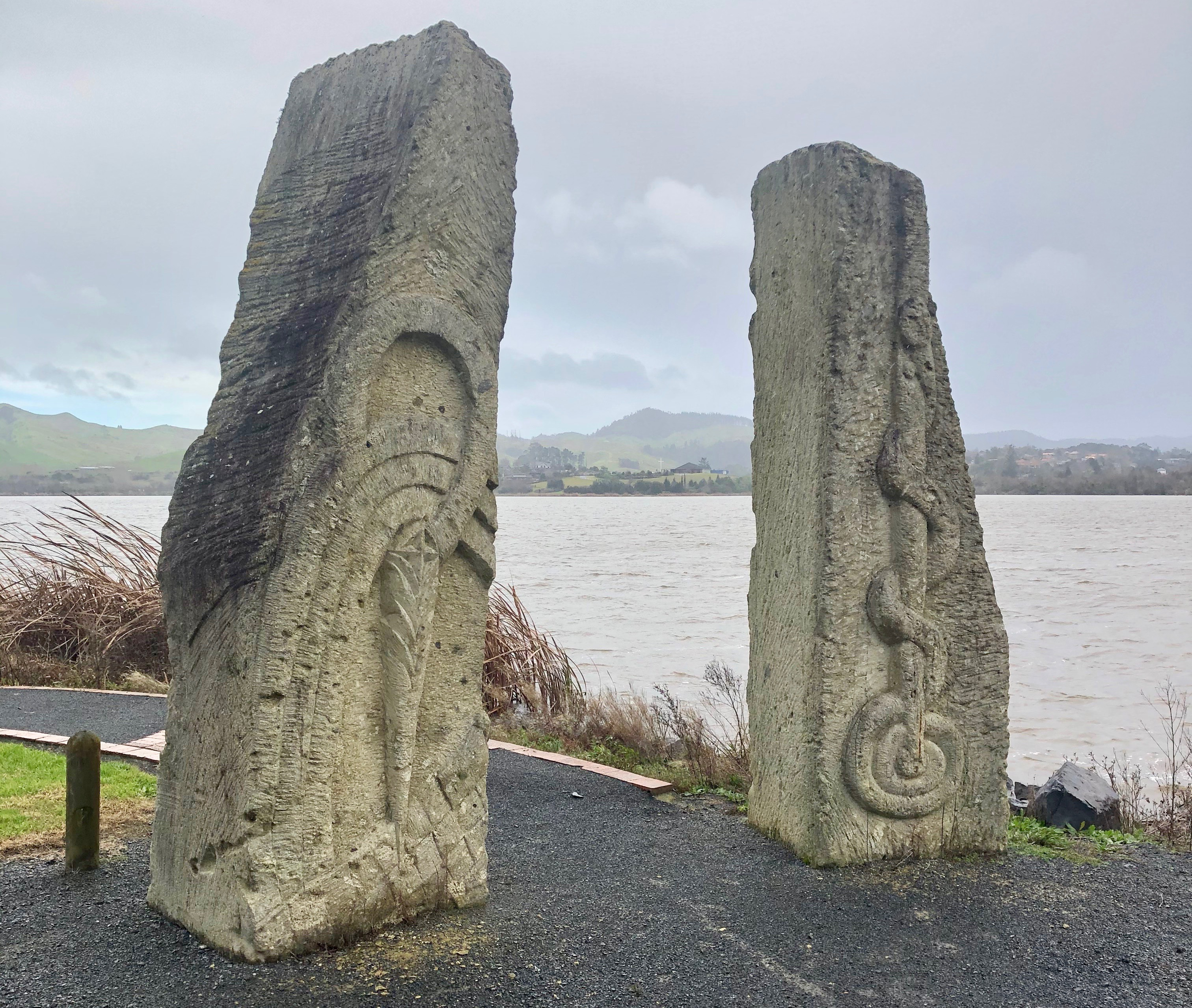
- Lake Hakanoa from entrance to Raahui Pookeka Gardens

- Location within North Island
- Location: North Island
- Coordinates: 37°33′00″S 175°10′00″E
- Type: riverine
- Primary outflows: Rotongaro Canal
- Catchment area: 6.13 km^{2} (2.37 mi^{2})
- Basin countries: New Zealand
- Max. length: 1.1 km (0.68 mi)
- Max. width: 0.8 km (0.50 mi)
- Surface area: 52 hectares (130 acres)
- Max. depth: 2.5 metres (8.2 ft)

Lake Hakanoa is located within the eastern side of the Huntly township, in the Waikato Region of New Zealand. Lake Hakanoa is a riverine lake with links to the Waikato River, which lies 300 m (330 yd) to the west. A smaller lake lies within wetland near the southeastern edge of Hakanoa.

There is a 3.6 km (2.2 mi) walking track around the perimeter of the lake.

The lake is 52 ha (130 acres) in size, has a maximum depth of 2.5 m (8 ft 2 in), with a catchment area of 613 ha (1,510 acres). The domain, lake, edges and wetland cover 93 ha (230 acres). The lake level is controlled by a weir on the Hakanoa Stream, which drains to north into the Waikato River. The lake was lowered over 2 ft (0.61 m) in 1923, though drainage work had also been done in 1911.

When Māori first came in the 14th century, tuna (eels) were plentiful in all the local lakes. After the invasion of the Waikato, Lake Hakanoa was usually referred to as a swamp and coal mine workings and spoil tips surrounded the lake, with a shaft close by, started after a new mine opened on the east bank after 1910. In 1932 unemployment relief schemes formed the tips into Huntly School grounds (in 1960 the municipal landfill south of the school was added), a rifle range and soccer club. In 1911 Lake Hakanoa was declared a game sanctuary and in 1926 it became a wildlife reserve. However, to improve fisheries, attempts were made to remove shags from the lake in 1927, which didn't become a protected refuge until 1958. Huntly Athletic Park Domain was created in 1930 as a recreation reserve and swimming pools added from 1943. Huntly Yacht Club has used the lake since 1954. The walkway around the lake was started in the 1960s and completed in 2001. Weeds affected boating in the 1950s and 1960s, so paraquat was used to kill it, but other water life was also affected. However, in 1987 bittern and spotless crake were noted around the lake. Huntly Lions built the bandstand in 2001. Management was transferred from the Department of Conservation to Waikato District Council in 2004. Features around the lake include Genesis Energy Gardens, Raahui Pookeka Gardens and the Green Cathedral.

== Fish ==
Trout were put into the lake in 1907 and perch at about the same time. A 2016 fish survey found mosquito fish the most common, but koi carp formed the greatest mass of a sample catch, at 74.4 kg (164 lb), followed by shortfin eels, 22.1 kg (49 lb).

== See also ==
- List of lakes of New Zealand
