= Lake Kimihia =

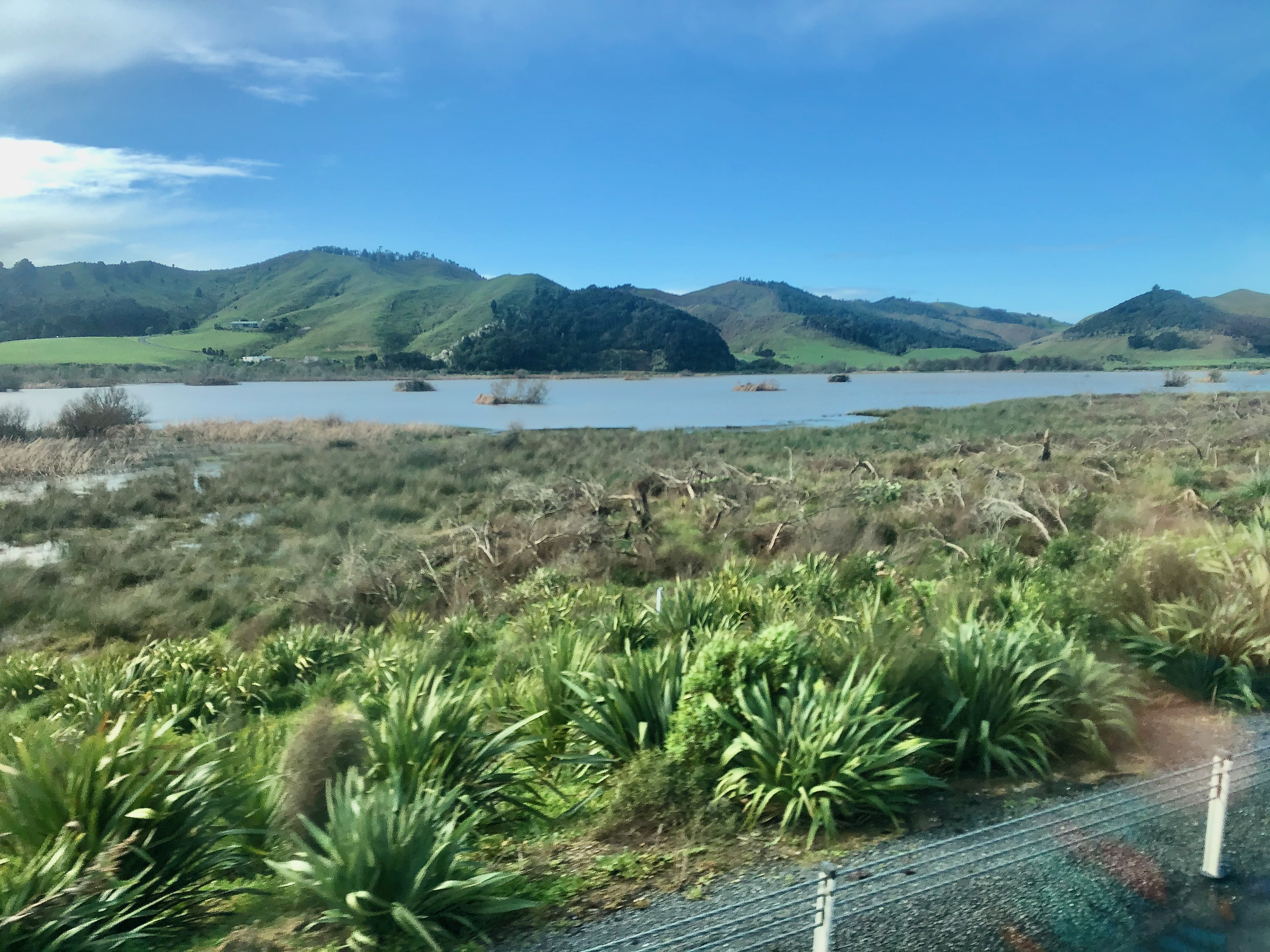
- Lake Kimihia from Waikato Expressway in 2021

- Location within North Island
- Location: North Island
- Coordinates: 37°31′30″S 175°11′30″E
- Type: riverine lake
- Catchment area: 1,485 ha (3,670 acres)
- Basin countries: New Zealand
- Max. length: 1.1 km (0.68 mi)
- Max. width: 0.4 km (0.25 mi)
- Surface area: 0.55 km^{2} (140 acres)
- Average depth: 3.3 m (11 ft)

Lake Kimihia is located approximately 5 km to the Northeast of Huntly, in the Waikato Region of New Zealand. Lake Kimihia is a riverine lake, which links to the Waikato River.

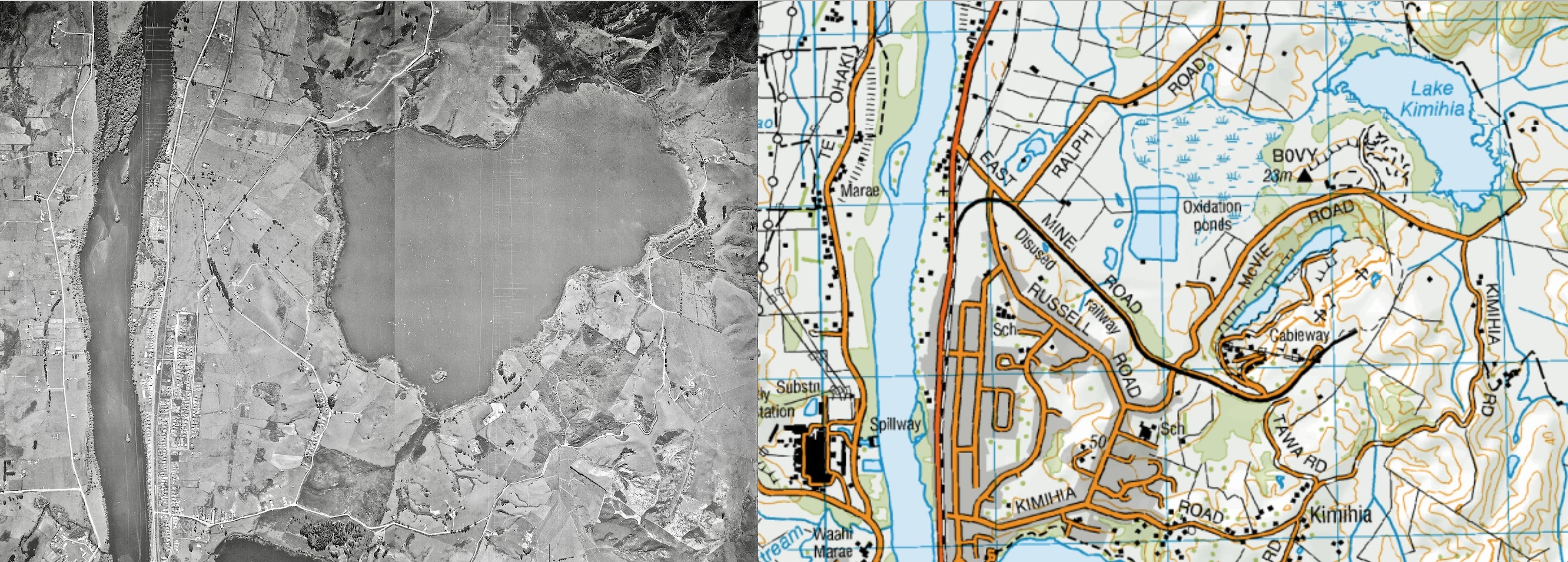
1941–2018 Kimihia

Lake Kimihia was significantly modified as a result of open cast coal mining, around the early 1940s. A cofferdam was built to allow mining over most of the bed, by reducing the lake from its previous 318 ha (790 acres). In the 1960s there were two lakes, but the westerly one has been replaced by a wetland.

The lake is situated within predominantly pastoral land. An area at the southern end of the lake is being developed into a wetland, as the Huntly bypass of the Waikato Expressway is built across part of the former lakebed.
