= New Zealand National Football Leagues =

Top football competition in New Zealand

The New Zealand National League is the name given to the current New Zealand top football competition. Originally set up as the New Zealand National Soccer League there have been many versions of the competition as well as many different names. The most common format saw club teams play each other, at least two times, on a home and away basis. At the completion of those games, the best-performing team was declared as the New Zealand champion. The latest version has the clubs play in their regional leagues with the top teams qualifying for the Championship phase to then play each other for the champion.

== Leagues structures ==
The national competition has had many different formats:

Structure	Format	Participation	Season	Entry
Provincial Champions; 1892–1968	Provincial	Club	Winter	Promotion/Relegation
Regional Leagues; 1966–1969	Regional	Club	Winter	Promotion/Relegation
National Soccer League; 1970–1992	National	Club	Winter	Promotion/Relegation
Superclub League; 1993–1995	Regional leading to National finals	Super Club	Winter	Promotion/Relegation
National Summer League; 1996–1998	National	Club	Summer	Participation criteria
New Zealand Island Leagues; 1999	North Island/South Island leagues North Island v South Island play-off	Club	Winter	Participation criteria
National Soccer League; 2000–2003	Regional leading to National finals	Club	Winter	Promotion/Relegation
New Zealand Football Championship; 2004–2021	National with playoff series	Franchise	Summer	Participation criteria
New Zealand National League; 2021–	Regional leading to National finals	Club	Summer	Participation criteria

== 1892–1968 ==
Canterbury

1905 Christchurch Celtic	1906 Christchurch Club	1907 Burnham IS & Christchurch Celtic [shared]	1908 Christchurch Club	1909 Burnham IS	1910 Burnham IS
1911 Burnham IS	1912 Christchurch Nomads	1913 Sydenham Christchurch	1914 Sydenham Christchurch	1915 Christchurch Club	1916 Christchurch Rangers
1917 Linwood Christchurch	1918 Excelsior Christchurch	1919 Linwood Christchurch & Excelsior Christchurch [shared]	1920 Nomads Christchurch	1921 Corinthians	1922 Rangers
1923 Sunnyside	1924 Sunnyside	1925 Sunnyside	1926 Sunnyside	1927 Nomads	1928 Western
1929 Thistle	1930 Thistle	1931 Rangers & Nomads [shared]	1932 Thistle	1933 Thistle	1934 Thistle
1935 Western	1936 Western	1937 Technical OB & Western [shared]	1938 Nomads	1939 Western	1940 Western
1941 Western	1942 Western	1943 Western	1944 Thistle	1945 Western	1946 Western
1947 Western	1948 Western	1949 Technical OB	1950 Technical OB	1951 Technical OB	1952 Technical OB
1953 Western	1954 Western	1955 Western	1956 Western	1957 Western	1958 Western
1959 Western	1960 Western	1961 Technical OB	1962 Western	1963 Nomads	1964 Christchurch City
1965 Christchurch City	1966 Christchurch City	1967 Christchurch City			

== 1965–1970 ==
Northern League

1965 Eastern Suburbs

1966 Eastern Suburbs

1967 Ponsonby AFC (Auckland)

1968 Mount Wellington

1969 Mount Wellington

Central League

1966 Kiwi United (Western League)

1967 Eastern Union (Central Districts League)

1968 Western Suburbs

1969 Western Suburbs

Southern League

1968 Christchurch City

1969 Christchurch Technical

== 1970–1992 ==
When the National Soccer League was launched in 1970, it became the first national league for any sport in New Zealand. It involved clubs playing each other two times, on a home and away basis. Two points were awarded for a win, and one point was awarded for a draw. The club with the greatest number of points was declared the champion. The league was open and clubs could be relegated from it and promoted to it.

The National Soccer League continued until 1992 when the League was disbanded due to financial reasons.

=== Season results ===
Year	League size	Matches per team	Winner	Relegated	Promoted	Notes
1970	8	14	Blockhouse Bay	-	Mt Albert-Ponsonby, Caversham	First season of the competition
1971	10	18	Eastern Suburbs	Western Suburbs FC	New Brighton	Hungaria joined with Miramar Rangers to form Wellington City, while Caversham, Maori Hill and Dunedin Technical joined to form Dunedin Suburbs
1972	10	18	Mt Wellington	Auckland City	Wellington United Diamonds	Dunedin Technical and Maori Hill withdrew support of Dunedin Suburbs and left the position to Caversham, while Miramar Rangers withdrew support of Wellington City. Mt Albert-Ponsonby changed name to Auckland City
1973	10	18	Christchurch United	Caversham	North Shore United	
1974	10	18	Mt Wellington	Wellington Diamond United	Caversham	
1975	10	18	Christchurch United	Wellington City	Wellington Diamond United	
1976	10	18	Wellington Diamond United	Gisborne City	Hamilton, Nelson United, Dunedin City	Christchurch United was known as Trans Tours United from 1976 to 1978
1977	12	22	North Shore United	New Brighton, Dunedin City, Caversham	Courier Rangers, Waterside, Woolston WMC	League expanded to 12 teams and promotion and relegation changed to 3 up, 3 down with a team from each regional league
1978	12	22	Christchurch United	Hamilton, Waterside, Woolston WMC	Manurewa, Manawatu United, Dunedin City	
1979	12	22	Mt Wellington	Manawatu United, Courier Rangers, Eastern Suburbs	Hamilton, Gisborne City, Rangers	
1980	12	22	Mt Wellington	Stop Out, Blockhouse Bay, Nelson United	Takapuna, Miramar Rangers, Woolston WMC	
1981	12	22	Wellington Diamond United	Takapuna, Woolston WMC, Rangers	East Coast Bays, Napier City Rovers, Invercargill Thistle	
1982	12	22	Mt Wellington	Hamilton, East Coast Bays, Invercargill Thistle	Papatoetoe, Nelson United, Dunedin Technical	
1983	12	22	Manurewa	Dunedin Technical	Auckland University	Number of points for a win changed from 2 to 3
1984	12	22	Gisborne City	-	-	Auckland University finished 12th but retained their place in the league following a four-way play-off win versus the regional league winners
1985	12	22	Wellington Diamond United	Napier City Rovers	Manawatu United	Wellington Diamond United merged with Wellington City and became Wellington City Diamond United – then shortened the name to Wellington United
1986	12	22	Mt Wellington	-	Mount Maunganui, Napier City Rovers, Hutt Valley United	Despite finishing 9th, Auckland University were dropped because their ground did not meet the required league standard. Manurewa who had finished last, were not relegated
1987	14	26	Christchurch United	-	Waikato United	League expanded to 14 teams. Dunedin City who had finished 12th, withdrew due to financial reasons meaning Miramar Rangers weren't relegated
1988	14	26	Christchurch United	Manawatu United	Waterside Karori	Nelson United, who finished 13th, were dropped because their ground didn't meet the required league standards. They were replaced by Waitakere City. Manawatu United was still relegated and replaced by Waterside
1989	14	26	Napier City Rovers	Papatoetoe	New Plymouth Old Boys	
1990	14	26	Waitakere City	Waterside Karori	Nelson United	
1991	14	26	Christchurch United	Gisborne City	Papatoetoe	Papatoetoe only played off against Central league winners Wellington Olympic as Southern league winners Dunedin City opted out due to costs
1992	14	26	Waitakere City	-	-	League disbanded and replaced by the Superclub competition. Hutt Valley United disbanded and Lower Hutt City took their place in the new competition

== 1993–1995 ==
Following the dissolution of the league a new competition, called Superclub Championship, was launched to decide the top club in the country. The top 10 clubs in each three regional groups (Northern, Central, Southern) would play each other home and away with $10,000 going to the team that finished first in their region, $7,000 for second and $5,000 for third. Then the country's top eight teams, being three teams from northern, and central regions, and two from the south, combine to play each other once. After that the top four teams then play each other once before culminating in a grand final between the top two from that round. For the team that finished first, they were paid $30,000, $15,000 went to the runner-up with $5,000 to third and fourth.

The winners in those years were as follows:

Year	Regional League sizes (N, C, S)	Regional matches per team (N, C, S)	National League size	Matches per team	Winners	Runners-up
1993	10, 10, 10	18, 18, 18	8	7	Napier City Rovers	Waitakere City
1994	10, 10, 10	18, 18, 18	8	7	North Shore United	Napier City Rovers
1995	10, 11, 10	18, 20, 18	8	7	Waitakere City	Waikato United

The increase in the number of teams participating for the championship, as well as lack of a true national league system, caused a strong drop in playing standards. It was clear that New Zealand not only needed a national league, but also one which was financially stable.

== 1996–1998 ==
In 1996 a National League was launched for the second time in the history of New Zealand soccer. This time however, the league was (mostly) played during the summer months and did not feature relegation and promotion. Teams were invited to participate and the selection criteria involved the financial strength of the club and its location. The league also featured a championship play-off session at the end of the seasons, involving teams finishing high in the table.

To further upset the traditionalists, penalties followed matches which ended in a draw. The winners of the penalty shoot-out were awarded two points, the losers one point while winners in the regular 90 minutes were awarded four points (although this system as dropped in the last year of the National Summer Soccer League). The winners in those years were:

Year	League size	Matches per team	Winners	Runners-up
1996	10	18	Waitakere City	Miramar Rangers
1997	10	18	Waitakere City	Napier City Rovers
1998	11	20	Napier City Rovers	Central United

== 1999 ==
In 1999, the National Soccer League again took a break. The competition for determining the New Zealand champion was moved back to (mostly) winter months. Two leagues were created, the North Island Soccer League (NISL) and the South Island Soccer League (SISL). The winner of the NISL, Central United, defeated the winner of the SISL, Dunedin Technical, 3–1, in extra time, in the championship final.

== 2000–2003 ==
The National Soccer League was launched for the third time in 2000 as the National Club Championship. Like the original in 1970, it was played during (mostly) winter months and a promotion and relegation system was used. In the first season, a bonus point was awarded for scoring four or more goals in one match but that system was dropped in subsequent seasons. The championship play-offs system at the end of the league was the major difference when compared with the competition launched in 1970.

Seven teams, participating in the first edition, came from the NISL (Central United, Waitakere City, Napier City Rovers, Mt Wellington, Miramar Rangers, Metro and Manawatu AFC) and three came from the SISL (Dunedin Technical, Nelson Suburbs, Woolston WMC).

Year	League size	Matches per team	Winner	Relegated	Promoted	Notes
2000	10	18	Napier City Rovers	Nelson Suburbs	Tauranga City United	Nelson Suburbs, who finished 7th, withdrew due to financial reasons. Metro, who finished 10th, retained their place following play-offs. Controversially, Tauranga City United, who finished third in the play-offs, were awarded Nelson's spot in the league, ahead of Caversham, who finished second.
2001	10	18	Central United	Metro	North Shore United	
2002	10	18	Miramar Rangers	Waitakere City	Caversham	
2003	10	18	Miramar Rangers	-	-	

== 2004 ==
2004 was the transition year between the National Soccer League and the New Zealand Football championship. Regional competitions were played but no New Zealand champion was determined.

== 2004–2021 ==
On 15 October 2004 the New Zealand Football Championship was launched (NZFC). It marked a turning point in the history of the game in New Zealand, as for the first time traditional clubs were not eligible to participate in the top league. They were replaced by eight so-called "franchises", which represented specific regions of the country. in the latter years of the competition a small number of traditional clubs were invited to join the league

== 2021– ==
In March 2021, New Zealand Football announced a change to the structure of both the premiership and the top regional leagues around the country. The four top regional leagues (NRFL Premier, Central Premier League, Mainland Premier League and the FootballSouth Premier League) would be formed into the Northern League, Central League, and the Southern League. These leagues would allow local clubs to qualify for the premiership season (now known as the National League Championship), with the top 4 teams from the Northern League, the top 3 teams from the Central League, and the top 2 teams from the Southern League making up the competition, alongside the Wellington Phoenix Reserve side. All teams that qualify plus the Phoenix Reserves, would then play a single round-robin competition between October and December. The top two placed teams will then progress to the Grand Final.

Year	League size	Matches per team	Winners	Runners-up
2021 (Note: Season was cancelled due to COVID-19 pandemic in New Zealand. One off South Central series was played instead. Season does not count as official.)	6	5	Miramar Rangers	Wellington Olympic
2022	10	9	Auckland City	Wellington Olympic
2023	10	9	Wellington Olympic	Auckland City
2024	10	9	Auckland City	Birkenhead United
2025	11	10	Auckland City	Wellington Olympic

== Champions ==
Teams in bold compete in the New Zealand National League as of the 2026 season.

Club	Winners	Winning seasons
**Auckland City**	11	2004–05, 2005–06, 2006–07, 2008–09, 2013–14, 2014–15, 2017–18, 2019–20, 2022, 2024, 2025
Uni-Mount Bohemian	6	1972, 1974, 1979, 1980, 1982, 1986
Christchurch United	6	1973, 1975, 1978, 1987, 1988, 1991
Waitakere City (Note: Disbanded clubs.)	5	1990, 1992, 1995, 1996, 1996–97
Waitakere United	5	2007–08, 2009–10, 2010–11, 2011–12, 2012–13
**Napier City Rovers**	4	1989, 1993, 1997–98, 2000
Wellington United	3	1976, 1981, 1985
Team Wellington	3	2015–16, 2016–17, 2020–21
North Shore United	2	1977, 1994
Central United	2	1999, 2001
**Miramar Rangers**	2	2002, 2003
**Eastern Suburbs**	2	1971, 2018–19
Bay Olympic (Note: 1970 tournament won by Blockhouse Bay, which underwent a merger in 1998 to form Bay Olympic, where it received the title as successor to the previous club.)	1	1970
Manurewa	1	1983
Gisborne City	1	1984
**Wellington Olympic**	1	2023

== All-Time Table ==
Table is of all clubs that participated in the national league from 1970 to 2026. League matches only, knockout matches aren't included. Club that merged/amalgamated/combined are counted separately.

Pos	Team	S	Pld	W	D	L	GF	GA	GD	Pts	Debut	Last
1	Mount Wellington	24	518	283	113	122	1052	587	+465	807	1970	1997–98
2	Christchurch United	26	526	263	124	139	976	624	+354	793	1970	2025
3	North Shore United	27	543	236	122	185	953	805	+148	769 (Note: 6 bonus points for winning the drawn match in a penalty shoot-out)	1974	2003
4	Napier City Rovers	24	441	205	100	136	874	710	+164	735 (Note: 4 bonus points for scoring four or more goals in a match) (Note: 2 bonus points for winning the drawn match in a penalty shoot-out)	1982	2024
5	Auckland City	21	319	226	51	42	777	325	+454	729	2004–05	2025
6	Miramar Rangers	23	449	194	95	160	820	722	−26	686 (Note: 1 bonus point for scoring four or more goals in a match) (Note: 4 bonus points for winning the drawn match in a penalty shoot-out)	1981	2025
7	Waitakere United	17	282	151	42	89	602	413	+189	495	2004–05	2020–21
8	Team Wellington	17	282	145	54	83	613	445	+168	489	2004–05	2020–21
9	Gisborne City	19	406	156	92	119	646	661	−15	487	1970	1991
10	Waitakere City	13	235	120	42	73	505	358	+148	427 (Note: 2 bonus points for scoring four or more goals in a match) (Note: 3 bonus points for winning the drawn match in a penalty shoot-out)	1989	2002
11	Canterbury United Dragons	17	282	115	53	114	461	444	+17	398	2004–05	2020–21
12	Manurewa	14	341	118	79	147	489	581	−92	398	1979	1992
13	Eastern Suburbs	17	290	128	57	105	545	457	+88	361	1970	2024
14	Hawke's Bay United	16	261	94	46	121	438	534	−96	328	2005–06	2020–21
15	Wellington United	12	214	89	41	84	363	369	−6	325	1983	1996–97
16	Wellington Diamond United	9	252	103	69	80	382	350	+32	302	1973	1982
17	Nelson United	13	287	86	59	142	358	528	−170	289	1977	1995
18	Waikato United	8	162	75	37	50	281	199	+82	267	1988	1996
19	Mount Maunganui	8	192	70	45	77	272	304	−32	263	1987	1996–97
20	Papatoetoe	8	192	69	45	78	275	285	−10	252	1983	1992
21	Dunedin City	10	224	81	51	92	329	373	−34	250	1977	1987
22	Central United	8	135	65	18	52	290	235	+55	241 (Note: 3 bonus points for scoring four or more goals in a match) (Note: 5 bonus points for winning the drawn match in a penalty shoot-out)	1994	2003
23	Blockhouse Bay	11	210	91	53	66	352	291	+61	235	1970	1980
24	Stop Out	11	210	67	55	88	302	369	−67	189	1970	1980
25	Hutt Valley United	6	156	50	37	69	194	249	−55	187	1987	1992
26	YoungHeart Manawatu	9	154	51	25	78	253	344	−91	178	2004–05	2012–13
27	Waikato	9	154	41	26	87	195	323	−128	149	2004–05	2012–13
28	Wellington Phoenix Reserves	11	151	41	25	85	252	367	−115	148	2014–15	2025
29	Otago United	9	154	32	31	91	161	326	−165	127	2004–05	2012–13
30	Nelson Suburbs	4	74	30	12	32	134	162	−28	121	1996	2000
31	Manawatu	7	72	34	8	30	132	128	+4	111	1986	2003
32	Southern United	8	114	27	18	69	147	267	−120	99	2013–14	2020–21
33	Wellington Olympic	6	51	29	8	14	137	82	+55	95	1993	2025
34	Hamilton	5	110	33	28	49	139	174	−35	94	1977	1982
35	New Brighton	6	112	34	23	55	155	204	−49	91	1972	1977
36	Dunedin Technical	5	94	25	14	55	125	195	−70	89	1983	2003
37	University-Mount Wellington	3	54	24	14	16	86	82	+4	88	2000	2002
38	Caversham	6	112	27	29	56	125	195	−70	88	1972	2003
39	Hamilton Wanderers	4	84	21	13	50	128	204	−76	76	2016–17	2019–20
40	Tasman United	4	70	19	17	34	112	143	−31	74	2016–17	2019–20
41	Manawatu United	1	96	19	23	54	112	200	−88	74	1979	
42	Auckland University	3	66	19	14	33	91	129	−38	71	1984	1986
43	Tauranga City United	3	54	19	9	26	89	98	−9	66	2001	2003
44	Wellington City	5	90	24	18	48	123	176	−53	66	1971	1975
45	Woolston Working Mens Club	5	87	15	15	57	92	206	−114	60	1978	1996–97
46	Melville United	3	47	15	6	26	93	117	−24	58	1996–97	2022
47	Canterbury United	2	36	15	9	12	65	64	+1	54	2002	2003
48	WaiBOP United	3	44	17	3	24	77	87	−10	54	2013–14	2015–16
49	Waterside Karori	3	74	14	15	45	84	149	−65	51	1978	1990
50	Birkenhead United	3	28	15	4	9	62	54	+8	49	2022	2025
51	New Plymouth Old Boys	3	78	10	13	55	72	293	−131	43	1990	1992
52	Courier Rangers	2	44	13	13	18	51	67	−16	39	1978	1979
53	Auckland United	3	28	9	8	11	40	49	−9	35	2022	2025
54	Western Springs	2	19	11	1	7	41	29	+12	34	2024	2025
55	Cashmere Technical	3	27	10	4	13	59	60	−1	34	2022	2024
56	East Auckland	1	18	10	3	5	34	24	+10	33	2003	
57	Christchurch City	2	36	6	11	19	44	74	−30	30	2000	2001
58	Western Suburbs	4	51	8	8	35	64	132	−68	28	1970	2025
59	Rangers	3	51	8	10	33	48	105	−57	27	1980	1993
60	Roslyn-Wakari	3	21	7	5	9	34	41	−7	26	1993	1995
61	Wanderers SC	2	30	6	4	20	43	68	−25	22	2013–14	2014–15
62	Metro	2	36	6	3	27	38	102	−64	22	2000	2001
63	Team Otago	1	20	5	4	11	43	54	−11	19	1997–98	
64	Canterbury Woolston	1	20	4	7	9	37	55	−18	19	1997–98	
65	Hutt City	1	20	5	4	11	31	52	−21	19	1997–98	
66	Auckland FC Reserves	1	10	5	3	2	17	10	+7	18	2025	
67	Coastal Spirit	2	19	5	3	11	23	43	−20	18	2024	2025
68	Dunedin Suburbs	1	18	6	3	9	25	44	−19	15	1971	
69	Takapuna	1	22	4	7	11	26	47	−21	15	1981	
70	Mount Albert-Ponsonby	1	18	4	4	10	20	32	−12	12	1971	
71	East Coast Bays	1	22	4	4	14	23	44	−21	12	1982	
72	Invercargill Thistle	1	22	3	5	14	18	51	−33	11	1982	
73	Hungaria	1	14	3	3	8	24	36	−12	9	1970	
74	Wanganui East Athletic	1	7	2	1	4	6	14	−8	7	1993	1993
75	Auckland City	1	18	2	3	13	21	57	−36	7	1972	
76	Christchurch Technical	1	7	1	0	6	5	17	−12	3	1994	
77	Petone	1	9	0	1	8	6	22	−16	1	2023	
78	Ferrymead Bays	1	0	0	0	0	0	0	+0	0	2026	

== See also ==
- Football in New Zealand
- National Women's League
- Chatham Cup
- Kate Sheppard Cup
