= Shane Rufer =

New Zealand footballer (born 1960)

Personal information
- Full name: Shane Arthur Rufer
- Date of birth: 23 March 1960 (age 66)
- Place of birth: Wellington, New Zealand
- Height: 1.85 m (6 ft 1 in)
- Position: Midfielder

Senior career*
Years	Team	Apps	(Gls)
1979	Stop Out		
1982–1983	FC Zürich	6	(0)
1983–1984	Lugano		
1984–1985	SC Zug	22	(0)
1985–1988	FC Zürich	69	(1)
1988–1989	Bellinzona	28	(0)
1990–1991	Servette	34	(1)
1997	North Shore United		

International career
1979–1985	New Zealand	19	(2)

Managerial career
- 1999–2002: FC Kingz (assistant coach)
- 2002–2007: YoungHeart Manawatu
- 2011: Cook Islands
- 2017–2018: Palmerston North Marist
- 2019–: Red Sox Manawatu
- * Club domestic league appearances and goals

Shane Arthur Rufer (born 23 March 1960) is a New Zealand former footballer who played as a centre forward, midfielder and defender. He represented New Zealand on nineteen occasions between 1979 and 1985, making his debut on 29 June 1979 in a 6–0 win over Fiji.

The son of a Swiss father, Arthur Rufer, and a mother of Māori descent, Anne Hine Rufer (née Campbell), Shane Rufer is the elder brother of Oceania Player of the Century Wynton Rufer. The two brothers joined Norwich City on trial for six months in 1981 and played in the reserves. City's hopes of signing the Kiwi duo were dashed when the Home Office refused to grant them a work permit.

In 1991, Rufer undertook a trial with Gillingham, and appeared in the club's 1991–92 team photo, but did not make an appearance for the side.

Rufer's son Alex is also a footballer.

== Career statistics ==
=== Club ===
Appearances and goals by club, season and competition
Club	Season	League			Cup		Continental		Other		Total		Ref.
Club	Season	Division	Apps	Goals	Apps	Goals	Apps	Goals	Apps	Goals	Apps	Goals	Ref.
Stop Out	1979	National Soccer League					–		–				
Miramar Rangers	1982	National Soccer League					–		–				
FC Zürich	1982–83	Nationalliga A	6	0	2	0	6	2	–		14	2	
FC Lugano	1983–84	Nationalliga B					–		–				
SC Zug	1984–85	Nationalliga A	22	0			–		–				
FC Zürich	1985–86	Nationalliga A	18	0	1	0	3	0	–		22	0	
FC Zürich	1986–87	Nationalliga A	18	0	0	0	3	0	–		21	0	
FC Zürich	1987–88	Nationalliga A	33	1	4	0	0	0	–		37	1	
FC Zürich	Total		69	1	5	0	6	0	0	0	80	1	–
Bellinzona	1988–89	Nationalliga A	28	0			–		–				
Servette	1989–90	Nationalliga A	16	1			–		–				
Servette	1990–91	Nationalliga A	18	0			–		–				
Servette	Total		34	1									–
North Shore United	1997–98	National Soccer League					–		(Note: Appearances in Northern League Division Three)				
Career total													–
