= 1984 New Zealand National Soccer League =

Round-robin club competition in New Zealand football

The 1984 New Zealand National Soccer League was the 15th season of a nationwide round-robin club competition in New Zealand football. Gisborne City finally wrestled the trophy away from the major centres, taking it to a provincial city for the first time.

== Promotion and relegation ==
Dunedin Technical did not apply for re-entry to the league, so the resumption of play-offs for league places was simply between the winners of the northern, central, and southern leagues (Auckland University, Stop Out, and Rangers respectively). Auckland University were victorious, entering the national league for the first time.

== Team performance ==
Gisborne City produced a marked improvement on their previous efforts, becoming the first team from outside Auckland, Wellington, and Christchurch to take the title. The win was a very popular one, and was in large part due to the work of Kevin Fallon. The side were only defeated once all season, by Manurewa, and followed that loss up with a string of six victories which produced an aggregate goal tally of 18-0. The side amassed a total of 59 goals, second only to Wellington's runaway 1979 performance. Papatoetoe were also a popular side, and their second season in the league saw them in title contention until a form slump in the latter part of the season. They still held on to finish second, ahead of Christchurch United, whose title run was also badly hampered by poor late-season form. Manurewa showed little of the form that they had displayed in their championship-winning 1983 campaign. The team was in the league's basement for the early p[art of the season, and never fully recovered, though they did pull themselves up into the top third of the table by season's end.

Capital city rivals Miramar Rangers and Wellington Diamond United filled out the remainder of the top half of the table. Both could be satisfied with their position, though WDU had a chance to finish higher but failed to win any of its last five games. The team's home form was poor, with only two wins all season. Dunedin City finished seventh, pulling themselves together after a lacklustre early part to the season. A 0-6 loss to Gisborne City seems to have scared the side into performing well, turning their form around significantly from this mid-season point to win seven of their final ten fixtures. Napier City Rovers finished eighth for the third consecutive season, though their form was probably less consistent than in previous years. Their matches tended to be high scoring, with an aggregate of 91 goals for and against in their 22 fixtures.

Hanimex North Shore United could not find the form which had seen them runners-up two consecutive seasons, and fell to ninth. Their powerful home form deserted them, and they suffered five defeats at home — taking their aggregate over three seasons to six. The season's big surprise, however, was Mount Wellington who fell from their perennial perch near the top of the table to finish tenth with only one victory in its last 12 games. It could have been worse for the Mount, as they had, in the early part of the season, scraped to a 4-3 win over Auckland University when reduced to ten men, after trailing three times during the match. If that result had gone the other way, it would likely have seen the Mount finish the season at the foot of the table. Nelson United looked to be finishing last for much of the season, but a late rally was just enough to lift them off the basement. Auckland University proved to be the unlucky side to finish last — unlucky, in that it had played effectively during its first season in the league, winning heavily when it did win, and only losing by single goal margins. This led to it having an unlikely goal difference of just -5 at the season's end. Despite finishing last, University won the 1985 play-off series and returned to the league.

== League table ==
Pos	Team	Pld	W	D	L	GF	GA	GD	Pts
1	Gisborne City (C)	22	15	6	1	59	16	+43	51
2	Papatoetoe	22	10	7	5	35	26	+9	37
3	Christchurch United	22	10	5	7	37	32	+5	35
4	Manurewa	22	9	6	7	40	42	−2	33
5	Miramar Rangers	22	8	7	7	40	46	−6	31
6	Wellington United	22	7	9	6	32	26	+6	30
7	Dunedin City	22	8	4	10	34	40	−6	28
8	Napier City Rovers	22	7	5	10	38	53	−15	26
9	North Shore United	22	7	4	11	27	31	−4	25
10	Mount Wellington	22	5	9	8	28	36	−8	24
11	Nelson United	22	5	6	11	25	42	−17	21
12	Auckland University (R)	22	5	4	13	31	36	−5	19

Rules for classification: 1) points; 2) goal difference; 3) number of goals scored.
(C) Champions; (R) Relegated

== Records and statistics ==
Golden Boot Award (Top scorer)

- Colin Walker (Gisborne City)

== Sources ==
- Hilton, T. (1991) An association with soccer. Auckland: The New Zealand Football Association. ISBN 0-473-01291-X.
