= 1989 New Zealand National Soccer League =

The 1989 New Zealand National Soccer League was the 20th season of a nationwide round-robin club competition in New Zealand football. Napier City Rovers had their debut championship win over Mount Maunganui, in doing so taking the title away from the main centres for only the second time.

== Promotion and relegation ==
At the end of the 1988 season two teams were relegated: Manawatu United finished last, and Nelson United were expelled for failing to meet NZFA ground criteria.

Traditionally, their places would have been taken by the top ranked teams in a play-off between the winners of the northern, central, and southern regional leagues. In 1989, however, this did not happen. Although Takapuna City finished top in the Northern League, a new composite team was promoted from that region, Waitakere City. This team was formed as a composite team consisting of several West Auckland teams (Te Atatu, Massey, Kelston West, and West Auckland), all of whom continued to keep their own sides as feeder clubs for the new team. The top ranked Central League team was also promoted, Waterside Karori, a team which had formed from the merger of former =national league team Waterside and Karori Swifts. The Southern league champions were the Christchurch United B side, who were not eligible for entry to the national league.

Papatoetoe were relegated at the end of the 1989 season.

== Team performance ==
The 1989 season was unique for the number of matches that had their results altered due to league rule infringements. Three matches had their results changed after the fact: Miramar Rangers' 1–1 home draws with Christchurch United and Hutt Valley United were both revised to 0–1 away wins, and Gisborne City's 2–2 draw at home with Manurewa was similarly amended to a 0–2 result. These three results took the tally in the leagues first twenty years to four amended results in total.

The season developed into a four-team race, with a seven-point gap at the end of the season between fourth and fifth. The race was tight and came down to the final match of the season. Mount Maunganui had led for much of the campaign, producing a 17 match unbeaten run in the early part of the season which had them on top. A dramatic reversal of form saw them win only two of their last eight games, despite recording an unbeaten record at home. Their stumble caused them to slip behind a Napier City Rovers side whose late season form came one match short of equalling the Mount's early season run. In the end it came down to the league's closest ever winning margin between the two sides, and Napier's more prodigious striking skills won the day. The other Mount, Mount Wellington finished third. Perennial title contenders, they lacked some of the sparkle of previous campaigns but still amassed the greatest number of goals and finished just three points off the pace.

Newcomers Waitakere City proved good value for money as the fourth of the title contenders. Exciting to watch, they proved difficult to beat in Auckland, where they won seven of the eight matches they played. They suffered with a slow start to the season, but were only five points off the title by the end of the campaign. Hutt Valley United finished fifth despite recording the season's biggest defeat by eight goals at Mount Wellington's Bill McKinlay Park. The Hutt Valley side's success was the result of good team organisation and determination rather than star players. Christchurch United slipped to sixth from being title contenders earlier in the season, a result of an uncharacteristic late-season slump. Injuries and the transfer of lynchpin defender Ceri Evans to Oxford were contributing factors in the derailment of their campaign.

Wellington United and Waikato United filled the next two spots. Both teams had inconsistent seasons, and in the case of Waikato the lack of a quality goalscorer proved a major handicap. Only the league's bottom two teams scored fewer goals in the 1989 season. Manurewa finished in ninth, but effectively denied Mount Maunganui the title by holding on in the final match of the season to draw 1–1 with the Bay of plenty side. A milestone of Manurewa's season was striker Mark Armstrong, who became the first player to notch up 100 goals in the league. North Shore United had a horror start to the season, with seven straight losses during which they scored just three goals. They were rooted to the foot of the table for over half the season, but a late recovery saw them scramble up to tenth.

Miramar Rangers played entertaining but largely ineffective football which saw them gain just five points from their first eleven matches. A change of coach and Colin Tuaa's regained touch in front of goal saw their fortunes rise, but it was too late for them to even get to mid table. Below them sat Waterside Karori. A merger and name change had not changed the form which left the Wharfies struggling on their previous league foray in the 1970s, and the team found it virtually impossible to win away from home, their solitary away win coming against another Wellington-based side. Gisborne City did not have a Golden jubilee year to enthuse over, with two 7–0 losses and only three points from their 13 away fixtures. Off-field the situation was just as dire and the club were briefly suspended from the league as a result of their financial plight. Even so, they managed to finish one place above Papatoetoe. A run of eleven straight losses and only a solitary home win all season did for the team. The top two sides of 1984 had thus sunk to the other end of the table, and the Reds were the ones who were shown the door.

== League table ==
Pos	Team	Pld	W	D	L	GF	GA	GD	Pts
1	Napier City Rovers (C)	26	16	7	3	57	36	+21	55
2	Mount Maunganui	26	16	7	3	38	18	+20	55
3	Mount Wellington	26	16	4	6	62	30	+32	52
4	Waitakere City	26	15	5	6	51	35	+16	50
5	Hutt Valley United	26	13	4	9	45	38	+7	43
6	Christchurch United	26	12	6	8	47	33	+14	42
7	Wellington United	26	12	4	10	42	38	+4	40
8	Waikato United	26	8	11	7	31	31	0	35
9	Manurewa	26	9	6	11	34	37	−3	33
10	North Shore United	26	7	4	15	46	59	−13	25
11	Miramar Rangers	26	5	8	13	40	43	−3	23
12	Waterside Karori	26	5	5	16	38	58	−20	20
13	Gisborne City	26	4	6	16	26	66	−40	18
14	Papatoetoe (R)	26	3	5	18	26	61	−35	14

Rules for classification: 1) points; 2) goal difference; 3) number of goals scored.
results from three matches were altered as penalties for rule infringements, as explained in the text. Table amended to reflect these changes.
(C) Champions; (R) Relegated

== Records and statistics ==
Golden Boot Award (Top scorer)

- Noel Barkley (Mount Wellington) - 24 goals

== Sources ==
- Hilton, T. (1991) An association with soccer. Auckland: The New Zealand Football Association. ISBN 0-473-01291-X.
