= 1982 Chatham Cup =

Tournament details
- Venue(s): Basin Reserve, Wellington
- Dates: 12 September 1982

Final positions
- Champions: Mount Wellington (3rd title)
- Runners-up: Miramar Rangers

The 1982 Chatham Cup was the 55th annual nationwide knockout football competition in New Zealand.

Early stages of the competition were run in three regions (northern, central, and southern), with the National League teams receiving a bye until the Fourth Round of the competition. In all, 125 teams took part in the competition. Note: Different sources give different numberings for the rounds of the competition: some start round one with the beginning of the regional qualifications; others start numbering from the first national knock-out stage. The former numbering scheme is used in this article.

== The 1982 final ==
Mount Wellington won the league/cup double for the second time, the first club to do so. Miramar Rangers' team included England's John Fashanu, who would later win an FA Cup winner's medal with Wimbledon FC. He is the first — and as of 2010 the only — player to play in both a Chatham Cup final and an FA Cup final.

The final was deadlocked for the entirety of normal time, and for the first period of extra time. The only goal came two minutes into the second half of extra time with a shot from Keith Nelson for the Mount. Despite the low score, the final was an exciting one, with Miramar soaking up the Mount's attacks and then countering with dangerous breaks.

== Results ==
=== Third Round ===
Brooklyn Northern United	0 – 1	Christian Youth (Wellington)

Ellerslie	2 – 1	Lynndale (Auckland)

Havelock North Wanderers	4 – 2	Gisborne Thistle

Masterton	1 – 3	Wellington City

Mosgiel	2 – 3	Western (Christchurch)

Nomads United (Christchurch)	0 – 2	Christchurch Rangers

North Wellington	1 – 0	Island Bay United

Old Boys (Invercargill)	5 – 5*	Caversham

Oratia United	2 – 0	Eden

Papatoetoe	6 – 0	Cornwall

Petone	2 – 1	Nelson United

Rotorua City	2 – 1	Clendon United

Saint Albans-Shirley	1 – 3	Cashmere Wanderers

Stop Out (Lower Hutt)	4 – 0	Manawatu United (Palmerston N.)

Takapuna City	0 – 1	Eastern Suburbs (Auckland)

Taranaki United (New Plymouth)	5 – 3	Wanganui East Athletic

Tauranga City	3 – 2	Claudelands Rovers

Tawa	0 – 2	Stokes Valley

Waitemata City	2 – 1	Metro College

* Won on penalties by Caversham (5–4)

=== Fourth Round ===
Caversham	3 – 2	Invercargill Thistle

Christchurch Rangers	0 – 1	Dunedin City

Christchurch United	8 – 0	Cashmere Wanderers

Christian Youth	0 – 4	Napier City Rovers

Hamilton City	5 – 1	Tauranga City

Havelock North Wanderers	4 – 0	Taranaki United

Miramar Rangers	3 – 2	Stokes Valley

Mount Wellington	3 – 2	East Coast Bays

North Shore United	2 – 1	Ellerslie

Oratia United	0 – 1	Manurewa

Petone	0 – 1	Wellington Diamond United

Rotorua City	2 – 1	Eastern Suburbs

Stop Out	w/o†	Gisborne City

Waitemata City	2 – 0	Papatoetoe

Wellington City	2 – 1	North Wellington

† Gisborne City disqualified

Western AFC received a bye through to the fifth round.

=== Fifth Round ===
Christchurch United	5 – 2	Caversham

Hamilton City	2 – 0	Waitemata City

Miramar Rangers	2 – 1	Stop Out

Mount Wellington	1 – 0	Manurewa

Napier City Rovers	6 – 1	Havelock North Wanderers

North Shore United	5 – 1	Rotorua City

Wellington Diamond United	1 – 2	Wellington City

Western	1 – 3	Dunedin City

=== Quarter-finals ===
Christchurch United	5 – 1	Dunedin City

Mount Wellington	3 – 0	Hamilton City

North Shore United	0 – 0 (aet)*	Napier City Rovers

Wellington City	0 – 1	Miramar Rangers

* Napier City Rovers won 5–4 on penalties.

=== Semi-finals ===
Miramar Rangers	1 – 0	Christchurch United

Napier City Rovers	1 – 2	Mount Wellington

=== Final ===
12 September 1982

Mount Wellington	1 – 0 (aet)	Miramar Rangers
Nelson

Basin Reserve, Wellington
Referee: L. Sharp
