= 1992 New Zealand National Soccer League =

The 1992 New Zealand National Soccer League was the 23rd season of a nationwide round-robin club competition in New Zealand football. It was the final season of the first incarnation of the league — it was replaced from the 1993 season by the Superclub competition.

== Promotion and relegation ==
Gisborne City were relegated at the end of the 1991 season, to be replaced by the winner of a play-off series between the winners of the northern, central, and southern leagues (Papatoetoe, Wellington Olympic, and Dunedin City respectively). Dunedin City opted not to take part, citing travel costs as a reason. Papatoetoe beat Wellington Olympic to be promoted to the league for 1992.

As the 1992 season was the league's last in this format, there was no relegation at the end of the competition.

== League table ==
Pos	Team	Pld	W	D	L	GF	GA	GD	Pts
1	Waitakere City (C)	26	19	4	3	64	26	+38	61
2	Waikato United	26	18	3	5	67	20	+47	57
3	Napier City Rovers	26	14	9	3	53	26	+27	51
4	Miramar Rangers	26	16	3	7	47	23	+24	51
5	North Shore United	26	14	3	9	49	35	+14	45
6	Mount Wellington	26	12	7	7	51	31	+20	43
7	Papatoetoe	26	11	8	7	34	24	+10	41
8	Christchurch United	26	11	4	11	48	42	+6	37
9	Wellington United	26	10	3	13	31	44	−13	33
10	Nelson United	26	9	5	12	30	41	−11	32
11	Hutt Valley United	26	5	10	11	33	49	−16	25
12	Manurewa	26	3	6	17	20	60	−40	15
13	Mount Maunganui	26	2	5	19	26	67	−41	11
14	New Plymouth Rangers	26	1	4	21	21	86	−65	7

Rules for classification: 1) points; 2) goal difference; 3) number of goals scored.
(C) Champions
