= West Auckland Kiwi True Blues FC =

West Auckland Kiwi True Blues
- Full name: West Auckland Kiwi True Blues Football Club
- Ground: Brains Park, Kelston, Auckland
- Chairman: Debbie McClarin; Lucy Macdonald
- Coach: Scott MacKay
- League: NRF League One
- 2026: NRF League One, 8th of 8
Home colours	Away colours

West Auckland Kiwi True Blues FC is an amateur association football club based in Auckland, New Zealand. Their home ground is Brains Park located in the suburb of Kelston in Auckland, they currently compete in the NRF League One.

West Auckland AFC and Kiwi True Blues FC, an Auckland Sunday Football Association team, merged their top teams in 2019, allowing Kiwi True Blues to play in the NRF Conference and together as one team in the Chatham Cup. Their first team coach is Scott MacKay, who won the National League with Waitakere City in 1990, 1992, 1995, 1996 and 1997.
