= New Zealand Superclub League =

Association football league competition in New Zealand

The Superclub league was a national association football league competition which ran in New Zealand from 1993 to 1995. It replaced the first incarnation of the New Zealand National Soccer League and was itself replaced by the National Summer Soccer League.

== Background ==
Towards the end of the 23-year history of the NZNSL's first incarnation it became obvious that some clubs were finding it difficult to recoup the costs of competing. Matters were brought to a head in 1987 when Dunedin City withdrew from the league, citing the heavy expense of travel. As the league's southernmost club, and with many of the league's sides based in Auckland, City was especially hard hit by financial concerns related to travel, and these costs proved to be a discouragement to other sides from the far south of the country.

In order to alleviate these concerns and keep costs down, a new league set-up was devised with three regional divisions - Northern, Central, and Southern - each consisting of ten teams (in the competition's third season the central regional league had eleven teams) followed by a nationwide competition containing the top eight regional sides (three from the northern region, three from the central region, and two from the southern region), with each side playing each other side only once. This stage was then to be followed by a short knockout stage between the top four sides.

== Champions ==
Three different sides won the competition during its three years of existence. All three sides had previously won the New Zealand National Soccer League

Year	Regional League sizes (N, C, S)	Regional matches per team (N, C, S)	National League size	Matches per team	Winners	Runners-up
1993	10, 10, 10	18, 18, 18	8	7	Napier City Rovers	Waitakere City
1994	10, 10, 10	18, 18, 18	8	7	North Shore United	Napier City Rovers
1995	10, 11, 10	18, 20, 18	8	7	Waitakere City	Waikato United

== Demise ==
It quickly became apparent to those involved in the competition that the lack of a true national league, accompanied by the greatly increased number of teams involved in the competition, resulted in a strong drop in playing standards. It was clear that New Zealand not only needed a national league, but also one which was financially stable. In an attempt to provide this, the Superclub competition was replaced in 1996 by the National Summer Soccer League.
