= 1993 New Zealand Superclub League =

The 1993 Superclub competition was the inaugural season of a nationwide association football club competition in New Zealand. It replaced the New Zealand National Soccer League which had run from 1970 to 1992. The 1993 competition was won by Napier City Rovers over West Auckland side Waitakere City.

== Structure ==
The competition was divided into three stages. In the first phase three ten-team regional round-robin leagues were played, with each team playing every other team home and away. The top teams from this stage progressed to a national league; the bottom teams were relegated to lower regional leagues.

The top eight teams (three from the northern and central regions and two from the southern region) then took part in the national league stage, with each team playing every other team once. Finally, the top four teams played a knockout competition to decide the champion. This involved the top two teams from the national league phase playing each other, and third and fourth place also playing each other. The winner of the match between first and second progressed through to the final; the loser of that match met the winner of the other match to decide the other finalist.

== Regional leagues ==
=== Northern League ===
Pos	Team	Pld	W	D	L	GF	GA	GD	Pts
1	Waitakere City (A)	18	13	3	2	58	15	+43	42
2	Waikato United (A)	18	11	5	2	45	19	+26	38
3	North Shore United (A)	18	12	2	4	34	22	+12	38
4	Mount Wellington	18	8	5	5	31	28	+3	29
5	Central United	18	8	4	6	34	34	0	28
6	Mount Albert-Ponsonby	18	7	4	7	29	32	−3	25
7	Oratia United	18	5	4	9	23	30	−7	19
8	Manurewa	18	4	2	12	23	51	−28	14
9	Papatoetoe	18	2	4	12	19	35	−16	10
10	Mount Maunganui (R)	18	2	3	13	22	52	−30	9

Rules for classification: 1) points; 2) goal difference; 3) number of goals scored.
(A) Advance to a further round; (R) Relegated

=== Central League ===
Pos	Team	Pld	W	D	L	GF	GA	GD	Pts
1	Napier City Rovers (A)	18	13	4	1	58	16	+42	43
2	Wanganui East Athletic (A)	18	10	6	2	52	27	+25	36
3	Wellington Olympic (A)	18	10	4	4	47	26	+21	34
4	Miramar Rangers	18	8	9	1	28	19	+9	33
5	Nelson United	18	9	1	8	28	36	−8	28
6	Wellington United	18	7	4	7	36	35	+1	25
7	Lower Hutt City	18	7	3	8	29	36	−7	24
8	Petone	18	4	3	11	28	39	−11	15
9	New Plymouth Rangers	18	2	1	15	19	53	−34	7
10	Waterside Karori (R)	18	1	3	14	23	61	−38	6

Rules for classification: 1) points; 2) goal difference; 3) number of goals scored.
(A) Advance to a further round; (R) Relegated

=== Southern League ===
Pos	Team	Pld	W	D	L	GF	GA	GD	Pts
1	Roslyn-Wakari (A)	18	14	3	1	45	10	+35	45
2	Rangers (A)	18	12	5	1	40	10	+30	41
3	Christchurch Technical	18	9	5	4	37	22	+15	32
4	Halswell United	18	8	6	4	31	20	+11	30
5	Woolston WMC	18	8	3	7	32	24	+8	27
6	Green Island	18	6	4	8	29	33	−4	22
7	Dunedin Technical	18	6	1	11	13	37	−24	19
8	Burnside	18	5	1	12	25	39	−14	16
9	Christchurch United	18	5	1	12	19	39	−20	16
10	Western (R)	18	1	3	14	13	50	−37	6

Rules for classification: 1) points; 2) goal difference; 3) number of goals scored.
(A) Advance to a further round; (R) Relegated

== National League ==
=== League table ===
Pos	Team	Pld	W	D	L	GF	GA	GD	Pts
1	Waitakere City (A)	7	5	1	1	15	7	+8	16
2	Napier City Rovers (A)	7	5	0	2	17	10	+7	15
3	Waikato United (A)	7	3	2	2	10	9	+1	11
4	North Shore United (A)	7	3	1	3	12	12	0	10
5	Roslyn-Wakari	7	2	2	3	13	12	+1	8
6	Wellington Olympic	7	2	1	4	13	17	−4	7
7	Wanganui East Athletic	7	2	1	4	6	14	−8	7
8	Rangers	7	1	2	4	7	12	−5	5

Rules for classification: 1) points; 2) goal difference; 3) number of goals scored.
(A) Advance to a further round

== Knockout phase ==
=== Play-offs ===
3 October 1993

Waikato United	0 – 1	North Shore United
		Stevens

3 October 1993

Waitakere City	4 – 1	Napier City Rovers
McClennan 2, Gray, Dawkins		Fletcher

10 October 1993

Napier City Rovers	1 – 0	North Shore United

=== Final ===
17 October 1993

Waitakere City	3 – 4 (aet)	Napier City Rovers
og, Jorgensen, Gray		Whittington 2, Fletcher, Cotton

Bill McKinlay Park, Auckland
