= Keith Nelson (footballer) =

New Zealand footballer (1947–2020)

Personal information
- Full name: Keith Robert Nelson
- Date of birth: 18 February 1947
- Place of birth: Renfrew, Scotland
- Date of death: 29 January 2020 (aged 72)
- Position: Striker

Senior career*
Years	Team	Apps	(Gls)
1968–1973	Cambuslang Rangers		
1974–1978	Hamilton AFC	88	(116)
1979–1984	Mount Wellington	127	(65)

International career
1977–1983	New Zealand	20	(16)
- * Club domestic league appearances and goals

Keith Robert Nelson (18 February 1947 – 29 January 2020) was an association football player who represented New Zealand at international level.

== Career ==
Born in Renfrew, Scotland, his first club in semi-professional football was with his hometown club Renfrew, but he quickly moved onto Cambuslang Rangers where he was a prolific goalscorer, winning the Scottish Junior Cup on four occasions in 1969, 1971, 1972 and 1973 as well as winning four caps with the Scottish Junior International team, scoring in all four games against Republic of Ireland, Northern Ireland, Wales and England.

He emigrated to New Zealand to join Hamilton AFC in 1974, and played a prominent role in the Waikato club's rise to the national league. He then continued to find the net with regularity at the highest level of domestic football.

Nelson became a naturalised New Zealand citizen in December 1976. He made his full All Whites debut in a 3–0 win over New Caledonia on 5 March 1977 and ended his international playing career with 20 A-international caps and 16 goals to his credit, including two hat-tricks against Chinese Taipei and Fiji. He gained his final cap gained in a 2–0 win over Ghana on 7 June 1983.

Nelson won New Zealand Player of the Year in 1976 and again in 1982, despite failing to make the final 22-man squad for New Zealand's first appearance at the World Cup finals that year (during which they faced his birth nation Scotland).

Nelson died on 29 January 2020.

== Honours ==
Cambuslang Rangers

- Scottish Junior Cup: 1968–69, 1970–71, 1971–72

Hamilton AFC

- Northern League: 1976
- Air New Zealand Cup: 1976

Mount Wellington

- NZ National League: 1979, 1980, 1982
- Chatham Cup: 1980, 1982, 1983

New Zealand

- Trans-Tasman Cup: 1983

Individual

- New Zealand Footballer of the Year: 1976, 1982
