= 1980 New Zealand National Soccer League =

11th season of a nationwide round-robin club competition in New Zealand football

The 1980 New Zealand National Soccer League was the 11th season of a nationwide round-robin club competition in New Zealand football. Mount Wellington became the first club to win back-to-back titles and also the first club to win the league four times, though their winning margin was significantly smaller than in 1979.

== Promotion and relegation ==
Promotion was automatic, with the three lowest placed sides in the 1979 league (Manawatu United, Courier Rangers, and Eastern Suburbs) replaced by the winners of the northern, central, and southern leagues (Hamilton, Gisborne City, and Rangers respectively).

== Team performance ==
Mount Wellington's win may have been only bo four points (down from the 14 points in 1979), but it was still a heavy victory. No other team looked like serious contenders. The Mount set several league records, notably a 9–1 win over Stop Out in Lower Hutt which was the league's biggest winning margin to that time, and also an unbeaten run of 13 matches which beat the league's previous record. Gisborne City's first season in the top flight since 1976 was successful, and an undefeated season at home enabled them to finish second overall. Manurewa finished third, and could have finished higher if its home record had been as good as its form on the road. Wellington Diamond United improved from a poor start to the season which saw them briefly at the foot of the table, and they managed to pull themselves up to fourth.

Hanimex North Shore United and the newly promoted Dunedin City rounded out the top half of the table. A poor start to the season by Shore and a mid-season slump from the southerners hindered the two sides from finishing higher up the table. Christchurch United had a poor season by their high standards, finishing in seventh. Their season started strongly with five wins on the trot, but their luck changed dramatically and they only won one of their last 14 games. Hamilton's second spell as a national league side started with them finishing in a comfortable if not brilliant position in eighth. Their home form was good, but they were let down by their away record, and the defence which had only let in four goals in their 1979 regional season found the national league an entirely different proposition.

Rangers' debut season was forgettable, though they did finish above the drop zone. They never fully recovered from losing five of their first seven games, and it was only a good spell in the middle of the season which enabled them to retain their league status. The three teams which did go down included two founding members of the league, Stop Out and Blockhouse Bay. Stop Out's season was poor but they did have one thing for which it was memorable — the debut of a young Wynton Rufer, later to make his mark both in New Zealand and overseas. Blockhouse Bay had been inaugural champions of the league in 1970, but a decade on their team was not of the same standard, and they never recovered from 10 defeats in their first 12 matches. Last-placed Nelson United also had a horror start to the season, though a mid-season revival did raise supporters' hopes of survival. It was not to be, however, and the Nelson side slumped to four losses in their last four games.

== League table ==
Pos	Team	Pld	W	D	L	GF	GA	GD	Pts
1	Mount Wellington (C)	22	15	5	2	53	19	+34	35
2	Gisborne City	22	11	9	2	44	24	+20	31
3	Manurewa	22	10	6	6	39	32	+7	26
4	Wellington United	22	9	8	5	31	26	+5	26
5	North Shore United	22	11	2	9	28	27	+1	24
6	Dunedin City	22	6	8	8	37	32	+5	20
7	Christchurch United	22	7	6	9	34	33	+1	20
8	Melville United	22	7	5	10	26	36	−10	19
9	Rangers	22	7	3	12	31	41	−10	17
10	Stop Out (R)	22	6	5	11	27	46	−19	17
11	Bay Olympic (R)	22	5	5	12	30	43	−13	15
12	Nelson United (R)	22	6	2	14	31	52	−21	14

Rules for classification: 1) points; 2) goal difference; 3) number of goals scored.
(C) Champions; (R) Relegated

== Sources ==
- Hilton, T. (1991) An association with soccer. Auckland: The New Zealand Football Association. ISBN 0-473-01291-X.
