= 1991 New Zealand National Soccer League =

The 1991 New Zealand National Soccer League was the 22nd season of a nationwide round-robin club competition in New Zealand football.

== Promotion and relegation ==
Waterside Karori was relegated at the end of the 1990 season, to be replaced by the winner of a play-off series between teams from the northern, central, and southern leagues (Mount Albert-Ponsonby, Nelson United, and Burndale United respectively). Nelson United won the series to gain promotion, but there is some controversy about their participation in the play-offs as they had only finished second in the central regional league, which was won by Petone.

Gisborne City were relegated at the end of the 1991 season.

== League table ==
Pos	Team	Pld	W	D	L	GF	GA	GD	Pts
1	Christchurch United (C)	26	19	5	2	64	21	+43	62
2	Miramar Rangers	26	17	2	7	45	26	+19	53
3	Waikato United	26	13	8	5	49	26	+23	47
4	Napier City Rovers	26	14	3	9	51	31	+20	45
5	Mount Wellington	26	13	5	8	39	24	+15	44
6	North Shore United	26	11	7	8	43	30	+13	40
7	Mount Maunganui	26	9	10	7	46	34	+12	37
8	Manurewa	26	10	6	10	29	37	−8	36
9	Wellington United	26	9	4	13	34	46	−12	31
10	Nelson United	26	9	4	13	38	51	−13	31
11	Waitakere City	26	7	6	13	44	40	+4	27
12	Hutt Valley United	26	6	9	11	28	36	−8	27
13	New Plymouth Rangers	26	4	3	19	23	70	−47	15
14	Gisborne City (R)	26	5	0	21	13	74	−61	15

Rules for classification: 1) points; 2) goal difference; 3) number of goals scored.
(C) Champions; (R) Relegated
