= 1988 New Zealand National Soccer League =

The 1988 New Zealand National Soccer League was the 19th season of a nationwide round-robin club competition in New Zealand football. Christchurch United finished as champions for the second season running, three points clear of traditional rivals Mount Wellington.

== Promotion and relegation ==
The last-placed team in the 1987 league would normally have been relegated, but Dunedin City withdrew citing the financial overheads of travel in the league, and so no team was relegated. City's place in the 1988 league was taken by Waikato United from the Northern league.

At the end of the 1988 season two teams were relegated: Manawatu United finished last, and Nelson United were expelled for failing to meet NZFA ground criteria.

== Team performance ==
The 1988 season came down to a two-horse race between traditional foes Christchurch United and Mount Wellington, neither of whom lost a match at home all season. At one point the gap between these first and third stretched to 17 points, though this was more than halved by the end of the campaign. Two players reached the milestone of 300 league appearances during the season. Papatoetoe's Keith Hobbs was first to the mark, followed on the last day of the season by Mount Wellington's Ron Armstrong, the last surviving player from the league's inaugural season.

Christchurch United were second in the table for much of the season, but eventually overhauled the Mount four weeks from the competition's conclusion. A good disciplinary record (with no red cards all season) and an undefeated run of 16 matches was almost enough for Mount Wellington to snatch the title, but even a league record-equaling 9–0 win over Manurewa was not enough to get them past the southerners.

If the seven-point gap between second and third was large, the gap back to fourth was even greater. Mount Maunganui was the only one of the league's remaining twelve sides to produce any challenge to the two leaders, and they finished in an isolated third place, 15 points clear of Napier City Rovers in fourth. An early run of losses was more than compensated for by a second half to the season which saw the Bay of Plenty side notch up 31 points in 13 games. They reduced the deficit on the top two, but the gap was far too great. Between them, the top three sides lost fewer games than any one of the league's remaining eleven teams.

Napier produced their best finishing position to date at the head of the pack. Fourth to eleventh were separated by seven fewer points than the gap from third to fourth, and Napier had been tenth only seven weeks before the end of the season. Waikato United's first foray into the league under this name was relatively successful, and the team pushed Mount Maunganui for third spot at one stage. The team had formed from a merger of several sides, among them former national league team Hamilton. Inconsistency was the key word in sixth-placed North Shore United's season. A run of four defeats left the team rooted to the foot of the table early on, but was followed by five successive victories. Results oscillated in this manner for much of the season, leaving the Shore mid-table.

Wellington United failed to consolidate on their 1987 effort of finishing third, suffering a mid-season slump which ruined any chances they may have had of repeating that feat. Despite that, its games were exciting and produced plenty of goals – an aggregate of over four per game on average. They also managed to finish one spot above fierce local rivals Miramar Rangers. Rangers were looking good after two-thirds of the season but a disappointing run of results in the last few weeks saw them slip from fourth to eighth. Gisborne City also failed to live up to the hopes they had after their excellent 1987 season. The 1987 runners-up and cup winners could only struggle to ninth in a season where there was little consistency to the team's play or results. Hutt Valley United finished below them, its lowly position the result of the team's failure to score in half of its games. A small revival in fortunes in the second half of the season was the only thing which kept the club above the bottom two places.

For Papatoetoe the 1988 season saw most of the goals come at the wrong end of the pitch. An inability to score and a leaky defence contributed to its lowly position. The club's problems were not confined to those on the pitch, as the liquidation of the team's main sponsor mid-season left them in dire financial straits. if Papatoetoe's defence was a problem, then Manurewa's was a nightmare. The team let through 69 goals during the season, but still held onto their now expected position just above the relegation zone. Nelson United were also perennial strugglers, but this season their survival fight ended badly. Although they did not finish in the automatic relegation spot, they were removed from the league for 1989 after failing to meet NZFA criteria. Last place in the 1988 league went to Manawatu United, who finished behind Nelson on goal difference. With only one home victory and a defence which allowed through 71 goals, the Palmerston North-based side were constantly near the bottom of the league, though it was only with the last match that their relegation spot was confirmed.

== League table ==
Pos	Team	Pld	W	D	L	GF	GA	GD	Pts
1	Christchurch United (C)	26	20	4	2	63	14	+49	64
2	Mount Wellington	26	19	4	3	64	18	+46	61
3	Mount Maunganui	26	16	6	4	52	34	+18	54
4	Napier City Rovers	26	12	3	11	45	44	+1	39
5	Waikato United	26	11	5	10	39	30	+9	38
6	North Shore United	26	11	4	11	43	41	+2	37
7	Wellington United	26	10	5	11	57	52	+5	35
8	Miramar Rangers	26	10	5	11	47	44	+3	35
9	Gisborne City	26	10	4	12	46	46	0	34
10	Hutt Valley United	26	9	6	11	28	34	−6	33
11	Papatoetoe	26	9	4	13	27	43	−16	31
12	Manurewa	26	6	4	16	32	69	−37	22
13	Nelson United (Note: Nelson United were expelled from the league at the end of the season for failing to meet NZFA ground criteria.) (R)	26	4	4	18	24	57	−33	16
14	Red Sox Manawatu (R)	26	4	4	18	30	71	−41	16

Rules for classification: 1) points; 2) goal difference; 3) number of goals scored.
(C) Champions; (R) Relegated

== Sources ==
- Hilton, T. (1991) An association with soccer. Auckland: The New Zealand Football Association. ISBN 0-473-01291-X.
