= 1981 New Zealand National Soccer League =

The 1981 New Zealand National Soccer League was the 12th season of a nationwide round-robin club competition in New Zealand football. Wellington Diamond United won the league for a second time, having previously been champions in 1976. The league was the closest until this point, with only four points separating the top five teams.

== Promotion and relegation ==
Promotion was automatic, with the three lowest placed sides in the 1980 league (Stop Out, Blockhouse Bay, and Nelson United) replaced by the winners of the northern, central, and southern leagues (Takapuna City, Miramar Rangers, and Woolston WMC respectively).

== Team performance ==
The league was decided by goals for only the fourth time, and for the first time neither of the top two teams came from Auckland. Wellington Diamond United's efficient, if unspectacular, style of play won the day. The team which took them all the way in the title chase was unexpectedly Dunedin City, with the best performance ever recorded by a side from the deep south. Dunedin City were one point away from achieving the league and cup double, having won the 1981 Chatham Cup earlier in the season. City had led the league early on, but a mid-season form slump ruined their chances of taking the league. Mount Wellington also led the league for a while aften an excellent run of seven wins in which they only conceded one goal. Gisborne City was the other team to have briefly perched on top of the league, with an unbeaten run in the early weeks of the season. New Zealand's successful 1982 FIFA World Cup qualification campaign ruined their season, however; despite being granted postponements of several matches due to the loss of several top players and coach Kevin Fallon, they could not maintain their form once they resumed, and the backlog proved too much for them to cope with.

Fifth-placed Hanimex North Shore United were also briefly in contention for the title, and only finished four points behind the eventual winners. With three matches to play, they were being picked as possible champions, but two defeats in their last three matches saw to their hopes. Sixth place went to Christchurch United, who set an unlikely league record with six scoreless draws during the season, including their first three matches. Tellingly, the team managed only one away win, though seven of the remaining ten matches away from Christchurch were drawn. Manurewa, like Gisborne, were granted dispensation for their heavy loss of personnel to the national side. When they resumed, they lay low in the table, and even though they had several games in hand, the chances of them challenging for the prize money had evaporated. Miramar Rangers finished their first league season comfortably, but unspectacularly, placed eighth. As with Eastern Suburbs in 1978 the team bolstered its ranks from England, bringing in Peter Mendham from Norwich City, and his six-match stint with Miramar saw them briefly enter the upper half of the table.

The lower reaches of the table contained Hamilton, who narrowly avoided relegation after a first half of the season containing just one win. They improved in the second half of the league, but were still lucky not to return to the regional leagues. Less lucky were newcomers Takapuna City and Woolston WMC. Takapuna proved experts at losing matches where they had led, having five reversals, most spectacularly a match against Woolston where they had led 3–0 before letting through five goals. A young squad paid for their inexperience, and the statistic of seven penalties awarded against them with none for them is telling. Woolston managed little better in 1981 than their previous one season in the league in 1978, although at least this time they finished one place off the basement. The third Christchurch-based team in the league had the dubious honour of finishing last; it was clear that the city could not support three clubs in the league. Rangers completed what was until that time the worst season for any league club — no wins, only ten goals, and just five points in 22 matches.

== League table ==
Pos	Team	Pld	W	D	L	GF	GA	GD	Pts
1	Wellington United (C)	22	13	5	4	46	17	+29	31
2	Dunedin City	22	13	5	4	43	26	+17	31
3	Mount Wellington	22	13	3	6	50	16	+34	29
4	Gisborne City	22	14	1	7	43	17	+26	29
5	North Shore United	22	12	3	7	35	31	+4	27
6	Christchurch United	22	7	9	6	23	19	+4	23
7	Manurewa	22	9	3	10	41	32	+9	21
8	Miramar Rangers	22	6	8	8	23	37	−14	20
9	Melville United	22	7	5	10	18	34	−16	19
10	Takapuna City (R)	22	4	7	11	26	47	−21	15
11	Woolston WMC (R)	22	4	6	12	23	53	−30	14
12	Rangers (R)	22	0	5	17	10	52	−42	5

Rules for classification: 1) points; 2) goal difference; 3) number of goals scored.
(C) Champions; (R) Relegated

== Sources ==
- Hilton, T. (1991) An association with soccer. Auckland: The New Zealand Football Association. ISBN 0-473-01291-X.
