= 1986 New Zealand National Soccer League =

Football competition

The 1986 New Zealand National Soccer League was the 17th season of a nationwide round-robin club competition in New Zealand football. Mount Wellington finished as champions, one point ahead of Miramar Rangers.

== Promotion and relegation ==
Napier City Rovers finished last in the 1985 league, and took part in a play-off with the winners of the northern, central, and southern leagues (Takapuna City, Manawatu United, and Rangers respectively). Palmerston North-based Manawatu United were promoted to the league, their first appearance in the top flight since 1979

There was to be no relegation at the end of the 1986 season, as it was decided to increase the size of the league to 14 teams. Auckland University were ejected from the league at the end of the season for failing to meet NZFA criteria, and three teams were promoted from the regional leagues.

One other new team appeared in the league, Wellington United. They were formed by an amalgamation of 1985 champions Wellington Diamond United and Central league side Wellington City, who had been one of the national league's inaugural members under the name Hungaria.

== Team performance ==
The 1986 season was not a vintage one for brilliant play, but did produce its share of entertainment, especially from Miramar Rangers, Papatoetoe, and new composite side Wellington United, who were formed from 1986 champions Wellington Diamond United and former league side Wellington City. the league devolved into two groups with a large gap separating the top five from the bottom seven sides.

Mount Wellington started the season as favourites on the back of some big pre-season signings, and did not disappoint, though their season was patchy at times. They remained unbeaten at home, allowing them to finish one point and one place above Miramar Rangers. It had looked to be Rangers' season, and they led the league until two matches from the end, but despite their last two games being at home they could not hold onto the lead, falling to a loss and a draw. Wellington United finished third, scoring more goals than any other side and only losing one away game, but their mediocre home form cost them the title. They did record the season's top score, an 8–0 win over North Shore United. Christchurch United's season had similarities to Miramar's; the team was in title contention until the last three games, but they failed to win any of them and slipped to fourth. Gisborne City completed the top group in the league. A poor start to the season hurt the club, but a mid-season rally took them within reach of the top, but not close enough to ever have more than a slim chance at the title.

Below Gisborne was a twelve-point gap, effectively splitting the league in two. Of the lower group it was Papatoetoe who finished top. Their season started badly, and at the halfway point they were bottom after picking up no wins and six draws in eleven starts. They then went on a run of seven unbeaten games to lift themselves into the middle of the table. Below the Reds were North Shore United who battled with a depleted and inexperienced squad. Dunedin City finished seventh for the second consecutive season. A dismal start and finish to the season were separated by a flurry of wins mid-season which was all that kept the side above the bottom few places.

The league's biggest controversy came not on the pitch but off it. Auckland University finished in ninth place, but were ejected from the league at the season's end for failing to meet the NZFA's criteria for a league side. On the pitch, their form was better than several in the league, and they were briefly fifth in mid-season. Nelson United continued their dismal form from the end of the 1984 season, competing for almost half the season before recording a win. A better second half to the season enabled them to climb two places off the bottom of the table. Manawatu United's return to the league saw them briefly flirting with the middle of the table before a damaging second half to the season which saw them win only one game. Manurewa also started brightly, and were in the top three after five games, but only managed two further wins all season.

== League table ==
Pos	Team	Pld	W	D	L	GF	GA	GD	Pts	Qualification or relegation
1	Mount Wellington (C)	22	12	8	2	42	22	+20	44	Qualified for the Oceania Club Championship
2	Miramar Rangers	22	12	7	3	45	27	+18	43	
3	Wellington United	22	11	6	5	46	29	+17	39	
4	Christchurch United	22	11	6	5	38	22	+16	39	
5	Gisborne City	22	11	5	6	46	35	+11	38	
6	Papatoetoe	22	6	8	8	35	34	+1	26	
7	North Shore United	22	6	7	9	38	51	−13	25	Qualified for the Oceania Cup Winners' Cup (Note: North Shore United qualified for the 1987 Oceania Cup Winners' Cup by winning the 1986 Chatham Cup.)
8	Dunedin City	22	6	5	11	38	40	−2	23	
9	Auckland University (R)	22	5	7	10	30	48	−18	22	Team ejected from the league
10	Nelson United	22	5	6	11	28	47	−19	21	
11	Red Sox Manawatu	22	5	5	12	30	46	−16	20	
12	Manurewa	22	5	4	13	27	42	−15	19	

Rules for classification: 1) points; 2) goal difference; 3) number of goals scored.
(C) Champions; (R) Relegated

== Sources ==
- Hilton, T. (1991) An association with soccer. Auckland: The New Zealand Football Association. ISBN 0-473-01291-X.
