= 1987 New Zealand National Soccer League =

The 1987 New Zealand National Soccer League was the 18th season of a nationwide round-robin club competition in New Zealand football. It was the first season in which 14 teams competed in the league, up from 12 in the previous season, and was also the first season with new sponsors Air New Zealand, leading to it being called the Air New Zealand Soccer League. Christchurch United finished as champions, seven points clear of Gisborne City.

== Promotion and relegation ==
Auckland University were ejected from the league at the end of the season for failing to meet NZFA criteria, and three teams were promoted from the regional leagues. Somewhat controversially, this included two teams from the central region and none from the southern league, although this was partly because the southern league was undergoing restructuring. The new teams included one returning to the league (Napier City Rovers), one making their first appearance (Mount Maunganui), and a brand new team, Hutt Valley United, who were formed as a composite side from various Hutt Valley teams including Lower Hutt City, Petone, and Stop Out all of whom kept their own sides as feeder teams to the new club.

The last-placed team in the 1987 league would normally have been relegated, but Dunedin City withdrew citing the financial overheads of travel in the league, and so no team was relegated.

== Team performance ==
The 1987 season was close until its final stages, with six teams in with a chance to win the title with seven rounds to go, and with three teams fighting to avoid relegation at the other end of the table. At the top, Christchurch United proved stronger than the pretenders, pulling clear to win by seven clear points. Their success included an excellent run through the latter two thirds of the season, in which they lost just one game in twenty and won all of their last seven fixtures. Keith Braithwaite hit a league record of six goals for the club in their match against Manawatu. Gisborne City held onto second place, but their season was plagued by an inability to convert tied matches into wins. A club record run of thirteen undefeated matches kept them in the title hunt. Third-placed Wellington United were capable goalscorers, totally 52, but the team could only manage one win from their last four games and dropped out of the race.

Mount Maunganui celebrated their first appearance in the league with a creditable fourth place, and had it not been for a mid-season form slump they could have finished even higher. In a generally poor season for Auckland teams, Papatoetoe flew the Queen City's flag highest, finishing in fifth, and they were briefly on top of the table at the beginning of the season. The acrimonious sacking of coach Fred Goodwin late in the season created the wrong sort of headlines for the club. Below Papatoetoe came Napier City Rovers, finishing sixth on their first season back in the league. Napier started brightly and also briefly led the table, but had a poor second half to the season with seven defeats in their last 13 games. The top half of the table was completed by North Shore United, who distinctly had a season of two halves. Their first 17 fixtures with only one defeat saw them riding high, and the club led the table for seven weeks, but the club's final nine matches produced a meagre five points.

Mount Wellington finished in the lower half of the table for only the second time in eighteen years. Their play was entertaining but inconsistent, and they failed to string together two good performances in a row at any point. Hutt Valley United's league debut was inauspicious, as it found itself at the foot of the table after four matches, but they managed to turn their form around enough to finish comfortably in mid table. Manurewa looked on the cards to repeat the poor form which saw them at the foot of the 1986 league table, with seven straight losses in the first part of the season. The second half of the campaign saw enough of an improvement for them to limp up to tenth place and safety. Below them came Nelson United, who also barely survived. They were rooted to the table's foot until two-thirds of the way through the season. After seven games it had yet to register a point and had only scored four goals.

Dunedin City survived relegation but not the bank. They led the table after one match, having beaten Miramar Rangers 5–2, but that was the season's highlight, and it won just five of its remaining 25 games. The team opted to leave the league at the end of the 1987 season, citing debts caused by the long travel necessary for the league's southernmost team. The club only survived for a further handful of seasons before disbanding. Manawatu United finished one place above last for the second straight season. The team managed only one home win all season, and lost their final home game 1–8. Oddly, there was not a single sending-off for either side in any of Manawatu's games in the 1987 league season. Miramar Rangers were the lucky team to benefit from Dunedin's woes; they could not have complained if they had been relegated, shipping 68 goals in the season and losing 18 games, ten of them on the trot.

== League table ==
Pos	Team	Pld	W	D	L	GF	GA	GD	Pts
1	Christchurch United (C)	26	18	4	4	60	24	+36	58
2	Gisborne City	26	14	9	3	52	31	+21	51
3	Wellington United	26	15	5	6	52	35	+17	50
4	Mount Maunganui	26	14	4	8	35	28	+7	46
5	Papatoetoe	26	12	6	8	53	33	+20	42
6	Napier City Rovers	26	11	7	8	41	39	+2	40
7	North Shore United	26	10	9	7	41	28	+13	39
8	Mount Wellington	26	11	6	9	56	48	+8	39
9	Hutt Valley United	26	9	3	14	36	52	−16	30
10	Manurewa	26	7	6	13	33	44	−11	27
11	Nelson United	26	6	4	16	28	51	−23	22
12	Dunedin City (Note: Dunedin City resigned from the league at the end of the season.) (R)	26	6	4	16	32	61	−29	22
13	Red Sox Manawatu	26	4	9	13	30	50	−20	21
14	Miramar Rangers	26	6	2	18	43	68	−25	20

Rules for classification: 1) points; 2) goal difference; 3) number of goals scored.
(C) Champions; (R) Relegated

== Sources ==
- Hilton, T. (1991) An association with soccer. Auckland: The New Zealand Football Association. ISBN 0-473-01291-X.
