= 1994 New Zealand Superclub League =

Sports league

The 1994 Superclub competition was the second season of a nationwide association football club competition in New Zealand. It was won by North Shore United.

== Structure ==
The competition was divided into three stages. In the first phase three ten-team regional round-robin leagues were played, with each team playing every other team home and away. The top teams from this stage progressed to a national league; the bottom teams were relegated to lower regional leagues.

The top eight teams (three from the northern and central regions and two from the southern region) then took part in the national league stage, with each team playing every other team once. Finally, the top four teams played a knock-out competition to decide the champion. This involved the top two teams from the national league phase playing each other, and third and fourth place also playing each other. The winner of the match between first and second progressed through to the final; the loser of that match met the winner of the other match to decide the other finalist.

No team was relegated from the Central regional league after the 1994 season, so eleven teams took part in 1995.

== Regional leagues ==
=== Northern League ===
Pos	Team	Pld	W	D	L	GF	GA	GD	Pts
1	North Shore United (A)	18	14	4	0	53	14	+39	46
2	Waitakere City (A)	18	13	5	0	60	17	+43	44
3	Central United (A)	18	9	3	6	26	30	−4	30
4	Mount Wellington	18	8	4	6	33	30	+3	28
5	Ellerslie	18	6	3	9	26	35	−9	21
6	Waikato United	18	5	5	8	33	39	−6	20
7	Manurewa	18	5	3	10	34	43	−9	18
8	Mount Albert-Ponsonby	18	4	4	10	29	45	−16	16
9	Papatoetoe	18	4	3	11	26	47	−21	15
10	Oratia United (R)	18	3	4	11	30	50	−20	13

Rules for classification: 1) points; 2) goal difference; 3) number of goals scored.
(A) Advance to a further round; (R) Relegated

=== Central League ===
Pos	Team	Pld	W	D	L	GF	GA	GD	Pts
1	Napier City Rovers (A)	18	13	3	2	52	19	+33	42
2	Wellington Olympic (A)	18	12	4	2	53	23	+30	40
3	Miramar Rangers (A)	18	10	4	4	41	23	+18	34
4	Wellington United	18	7	4	7	26	29	−3	25
5	Wanganui East Athletic	18	7	2	9	33	33	0	23
6	Petone	18	6	3	9	28	29	−1	21
7	Red Sox Manawatu	18	5	3	10	27	55	−28	18
8	New Plymouth Rangers	18	3	7	8	19	31	−12	16
9	Lower Hutt City	18	4	4	10	24	41	−17	16
10	Nelson United	18	4	4	10	13	33	−20	16

Rules for classification: 1) points; 2) goal difference; 3) number of goals scored.
(A) Advance to a further round

=== Southern League ===
Pos	Team	Pld	W	D	L	GF	GA	GD	Pts
1	Christchurch Technical (A)	18	13	3	2	59	18	+41	42
2	Roslyn-Wakari (A)	18	13	1	4	47	11	+36	40
3	Rangers	18	13	1	4	35	15	+20	40
4	Woolston WMC	18	12	2	4	27	20	+7	38
5	Halswell United	18	6	6	6	25	27	−2	24
6	Christchurch United	18	5	3	10	15	31	−16	18
7	Burnside	18	4	3	11	23	34	−11	15
8	Dunedin Technical	18	4	3	11	19	37	−18	15
9	Cashmere Wanderers	18	4	2	12	12	37	−25	14
10	Green Island (R)	18	2	4	12	15	47	−32	10

Rules for classification: 1) points; 2) goal difference; 3) number of goals scored.
(A) Advance to a further round; (R) Relegated

== National League ==
=== League table ===
Pos	Team	Pld	W	D	L	GF	GA	GD	Pts
1	Waitakere City (A)	7	5	2	0	12	4	+8	17
2	Napier City Rovers (A)	7	5	1	1	21	10	+11	16
3	North Shore United (A)	7	4	2	1	24	11	+13	14
4	Roslyn-Wakari (A)	7	4	1	2	11	10	+1	13
5	Wellington Olympic	7	3	2	2	20	13	+7	11
6	Miramar Rangers	7	2	0	5	8	16	−8	6
7	Christchurch Technical	7	1	0	6	5	17	−12	3
8	Central United	7	0	0	7	2	22	−20	0

Rules for classification: 1) points; 2) goal difference; 3) number of goals scored.
(A) Advance to a further round

== Knockout phase ==
=== Playoffs ===
North Shore United	2 – 0	Roslyn-Wakari

Waitakere City	2 – 3	Napier City Rovers

Waitakere City	0 – 3	North Shore United

=== Final ===
17 October 1993

Napier City Rovers	1 – 3	North Shore United

Park Island, Napier

== Records and statistics ==
Player of the Year

- Darren McClennan (Waitakere City)

Coach of the Year

- Keith Pritchett (Waitakere City)

Player's Choice Player of the Year

- Neil Woodhams (Waitakere City)

Young Player of the Year

- Ivan Vicelich (Waitakere City)
