= 1990 New Zealand National Soccer League =

The 1990 New Zealand National Soccer League was the 21st season of a nationwide round-robin club competition in New Zealand football. Waitakere City won the league for the first time, by two points over Auckland neighbours Mount Wellington.

== Promotion and relegation ==
Papatoetoe were relegated at the end of the 1989 season. Their place was taken by New Plymouth Old Boys, the winners of the Central League. the winners of the Northern and Southern Leagues were Mount Roskill and Burndale United respectively.

Waterside Karori were relegated at the end of the 1990 season.

== Team performance ==
The 1990 league saw Waitakere City triumph in only their second league season. Mount Wellington led the league for much of the season, stringing together an undefeated 12-match run at the start of the season. Waitakere's consistency and determination paid off, however. They started the season with two losses, but strung together an excellent series of seventeen wins from nineteen games to climb the table, finally overhauling the Mount three games from the finish. They completed their season three points clear, then had to wait for a week for Mount Wellington's final game against relegation-bound Waterside Karori. The Wharfies held on to draw, and the West Auckland side had its first title. Mount Wellington fell away late in the season as they had done in 1988, throwing away what at times seemed a certain victorious campaign.

Christchurch United finished a distant third, its campaign ruined by its inability to beat any of the Auckland-based sides. It was pursued all the way by Waikato United, the tussle for third and fourth being as separate from the rest of the table as that for first and second. A further nine points separated these two teams from Manurewa, who were engaged in their own private tussle with Napier City Rovers. Manurewa only finished on top by goal difference after an astonishing 7–1 win over Hutt Valley United in their last game of the season, having been held 1–1 at half time. Napier paid for its inability to finish games off. Though they were a tough team to beat, they also found winning a problem, and finished the season with eleven draws from their 26 games.

Beyond these two teams was a further gap of six points to a group of five teams who made up the lower-middle of the table. Coaching upheaval cost both Mount Maunganui and North Shore United any chance of finishing further up the table, and in the case of Shore things could have been much worse. At the halfway stage of the season they were firmly in last place with just eight points. The second half of the season saw a marked improvement and the relative safety of the middle of the table.

Wellington teams suffered badly in 1990, with all four of the region's sides finishing in the lower reaches of the table. Best-placed of these was Miramar Rangers, who came no higher than ninth. Their season was marked by rebuilding; six players, plus the coach and assistant coach, had been with Wellington United in 1989, and it was to take some time for the new side to settle down. Hutt Valley United finished next, their position the result of an inability to score goals and a dramatic late-season slump which saw them drop from fourth at the halfway point. Wellington United's form was greatly impaired by the loss of squad members. Not only had Miramar picked up half a dozen of United's 1989 side, but a further four squad members had also left through retirement or transfer. The youthful team performed adequately, but inexperience accounted for the league's worst defensive record of the season.

A further gap separated the bottom three clubs from mid-table safety. Gisborne City were in danger of relegation all season, notably after a disastrous mid-season spell with eight losses in nine games. Gisborne finally rallied, notably in their final thrilling encounter with Miramar Rangers which saw them recover from a 1–3 deficit to win 5–4. An inexperienced New Plymouth Old Boys side looked to be heading straight back to the regional leagues, but finally managed to pull themselves off the bottom spot two-thirds of the way through the season. It was Waterside Karori who suffered the fate of relegation. Dismal away form which saw them win just once away from Karori Park, and their main contribution to the season was probably their final day draw to deny Mount Wellington the title.

== League table ==
Pos	Team	Pld	W	D	L	GF	GA	GD	Pts
1	Waitakere City (C)	26	20	2	4	60	24	+36	62
2	Mount Wellington	26	18	6	2	54	19	+35	60
3	Christchurch United	26	15	4	7	50	32	+18	49
4	Waikato United	26	14	5	7	44	31	+13	47
5	Manurewa	26	10	8	8	38	32	+6	38
6	Napier City Rovers	26	9	11	6	41	36	+5	38
7	Mount Maunganui	26	9	5	12	40	38	+2	32
8	North Shore United	26	8	6	12	34	38	−4	30
9	Miramar Rangers	26	8	5	13	35	47	−12	29
10	Hutt Valley United	26	8	5	13	24	40	−16	29
11	Wellington United	26	8	5	13	32	52	−20	29
12	Gisborne City	26	6	6	14	30	49	−19	24
13	New Plymouth Rangers	26	5	6	15	28	47	−19	21
14	Waterside Karori (R)	26	3	8	15	22	47	−25	17

Rules for classification: 1) points; 2) goal difference; 3) number of goals scored.
(C) Champions; (R) Relegated

== Sources ==
- Hilton, T. (1991) An association with soccer. Auckland: The New Zealand Football Association. ISBN 0-473-01291-X.
