= 1974 New Zealand National Soccer League =

New Zealand National Soccer League
- Season: 1974
- Champions: Mount Wellington
- Relegated: Wellington Diamond United

The 1974 New Zealand National Soccer League was the fifth season of a nationwide round-robin club competition in New Zealand football.

== Promotion and relegation ==
Caversham finished last in the 1973 league and so contested a round-robin home and away play-off series with the winners of the northern, central, and southern leagues (North Shore United, Waterside, and Christchurch Rangers respectively). With the exception of Shore's two big wins over the Wharfies of Wellington the matches were evenly contested, and it was those two performances which finally told. With three wins, two draws and a loss, North Shore United pipped Caversham by one point to enter the NZNSL for the first time.

== Team performance ==
Mount Wellington became the first team to win the league for a second time, having previously won in 1972. They achieved this with a performance that was as convincing as their great rival Christchurch United's triumph the previous season. They finished the table seven points ahead of the pack, a figure achieved without losing a match away from home, and only losing one match in all their 18 fixtures, that to Eastern Suburbs. Ironically, the season's biggest win came to bottom-placed Wellington Diamond United, an 8-0 thrashing of the same Eastern Suburbs side on the following weekend.

As with the previous season, the big gap between first and the rest was accompanied by a major tussle to finish in second. Christchurch United narrowly managed to gain second place, one point ahead of neighbours New Brighton and Stop Out, both of whom finally put their past seasons' lacklustre form behind them. United started poorly and had only nine points halfway through the season, before going on a ten-match unbeaten run. A new coach (Alan Vest) changed New Brighton's fortunes, and the side produced an excellent home record with seven wins from nine starts. Stop Out also had a change in fortune, and could have finished runners-up if they had not lost their last game of the season.

Blockhouse Bay and newcomers North Shore United comfortably filled the middle two spots in the table, and seventh-placed Wellington City were also comfortably clear of the relegation zone. City set one unwanted record during the season, becoming the first side to concede 100 goals in its national league career. Gisborne City were in danger of dropping out of the league after a poor start to the season, but a change of coach was accompanied by a change of fortune, with four wins from their last nine matches. Eastern Suburbs had their worst season to this point, and the 1971 champions were in serious danger of relegation. A poor goal-scoring return coupled with the leakiest defence in the league left them only one place above the drop. The wooden spoon, though, went to Wellington Diamond United, who — despite the big win over Eastern Suburbs — never looked like surviving. That win accounted for over a third of their season's goals, and they finished the season without a single away win.

== League table ==
Pos	Team	Pld	W	D	L	GF	GA	GR	Pts
1	Mount Wellington (C)	18	12	5	1	44	19	2.316	29
2	Christchurch United	18	8	6	4	31	19	1.632	22
3	New Brighton	18	9	3	6	34	25	1.360	21
4	Stop Out	18	9	3	6	26	23	1.130	21
5	Bay Olympic	18	8	4	6	32	23	1.391	20
6	North Shore United	18	6	4	8	23	27	0.852	16
7	Wellington City	18	5	5	8	32	38	0.842	15
8	Gisborne City	18	5	3	10	21	35	0.600	13
9	Eastern Suburbs	18	5	3	10	23	45	0.511	13
10	Wellington Diamond United (R)	18	4	2	12	22	34	0.647	10

Rules for classification: 1) points; 2) goal ratio.
(C) Champions; (R) Relegated

== Sources ==
- Hilton, T. (1991) An association with soccer. Auckland: The New Zealand Football Association. ISBN 0-473-01291-X.
