= 1983 New Zealand National Soccer League =

The 1983 New Zealand National Soccer League was the 14th season of a nationwide round-robin club competition in New Zealand football. Manurewa comfortably won the league for the first time, finishing eight points clear of second-placed Hanimex North Shore United. This was the first season in which a win scored three points; prior to this they were worth only two.

== Promotion and relegation ==
Promotion was automatic, with the three lowest placed sides in the 1982 league (Hamilton, East Coast Bays, and Invercargill Thistle) replaced by the winners of the northern, central, and southern leagues (Papatoetoe, Nelson United, and Dunedin Technical respectively).

From 1983 play-offs for promotion and relegation returned, with the bottom side in the league playing off with the three regional champions for a solitary league place. This was thus the last season in which the top teams from the regional leagues would automatically enter the league. In the event bottom-placed Dunedin Technical withdrew from the league at the end of the season, meaning that the three regional champions would play off for the vacancy.

== Team performance ==
It was Auckland's year, with all of the top four places filled by teams from the Queen City. The league was very close with teams who had led early ending in the bottom half of the table and vice versa. As the second half of the season started only two points separated second from ninth, and at the end of the season fourth and seventh place were separated on goal difference alone. Manurewa were by far the league's strongest side in 1983, and would have finished first by either the old or new points system. They scored five more goals than the second highest scoring team, and conceded fewer than any other side as well on their way to the title. Their season was topsy-turvy, and after three matches they were bottom of the league with just one point. Their remaining 19 matches contained only two further losses, however. Their team was bolstered by the twin acquisitions of Steve Sumner and Mark Armstrong, who between them scored 30 goals. Sumner was the league's top scorer with 18, and the inaugural winner of the league's Golden Boot award.

Hanimex North Shore United repeated 1982's second placing, and did so in a similarly unorthodox fashion. As with their 1982 performance, they could not repeat their home form away. At home they were invincible, with ten wins and a single draw from their eleven matches. Away, they were a different side, drawing five, losing six, and failing to pick up a single win. Newcomers Papatoetoe impressed with their third placing. unlike North Shore, it was the reds' away form which saw them reach the heights, with seven wins on the road. Mount Wellington had a lacklustre season by their high standards, finishing fourth. They led in the first half of the season, but their later form was inconsistent and the league at the halfway mark was too close for that to go unpunished. Fifth-placed Christchurch United had also headed the table mid-season, but a series of bad results saw them drop to the lower reaches of the table.

Wellington Diamond United was another team briefly in title contention after an undefeated string of eight matches. A mid-season break did them no favours, and they found it impossible to replicate this early form on the resumption. Early competition leaders Miramar Rangers also found their early good form elusive to repeat, and their last seven matches included just two wins. Napier City Rovers' season was the opposite of this; they started very poorly but produced an excellent second half to the season to rise out of relegation danger. Dunedin City was another team to have a mid-season change of fortune. With five games to go they were second on the table, but their final five games produced only one point.

Gisborne City had a consistently poor season, never being far from the foot of the table. Nelson United finished one point below Gisborne, a far cry from the brief spell they had at the top of the table after the opening round of matches. Neither they nor Gisborne was in any real danger of relegation, however, as Dunedin Technical found the step up from the regional leagues simply too great. They set records of the wrong sort with 59 goals scored against them and a gap of 20 points between them and eleventh placed Nelson.

== League table ==
Pos	Team	Pld	W	D	L	GF	GA	GD	Pts
1	Manurewa (C)	22	13	5	4	46	23	+23	44
2	North Shore United	22	10	6	6	40	27	+13	36
3	Papatoetoe	22	10	5	7	29	27	+2	35
4	Mount Wellington	22	9	5	8	31	26	+5	32
5	Christchurch United	22	9	5	8	41	37	+4	32
6	Wellington United	22	8	8	6	29	25	+4	32
7	Miramar Rangers	22	8	8	6	36	33	+3	32
8	Napier City Rovers	22	8	6	8	29	26	+3	30
9	Dunedin City	22	9	2	11	23	31	−8	29
10	Gisborne City	22	7	7	8	27	29	−2	28
11	Nelson United	22	8	3	11	28	34	−6	27
12	Dunedin Technical (R)	22	1	4	17	18	59	−41	7

Rules for classification: 1) points; 2) goal difference; 3) number of goals scored.
(C) Champions; (R) Relegated

== Records and statistics ==
Golden Boot Award (Top scorer)

- Steve Sumner (Manurewa) – 18 goals

== Sources ==
- Hilton, T. (1991) An association with soccer. Auckland: The New Zealand Football Association. ISBN 0-473-01291-X.
