= 1975 New Zealand National Soccer League =

National soccer League in New Zealand

The 1975 New Zealand National Soccer League was the sixth season of a nationwide round-robin club competition in New Zealand football.

== Promotion and relegation ==
Wellington Diamond United finished last in the 1974 league and so contested a round-robin home and away play-off series with the winners of the northern, central, and southern leagues (Eden, Porirua United, and Caversham respectively). Caversham dominated the series and returned to the league after a gap of just one season. With only one loss in the first five games (to Porirua), Caversham had an unassailable three point lead after the first five rounds; the last round of matches was not played as it would have made no difference to the outcome.

== Team performance ==
Christchurch United won by three clear points to gain their second title. Competition was close, however, especially in the middle of the table, with only one point separating fourth from seventh. North Shore United, in their second season in the league, did very well, holding the lead for several weeks and finishing second. Shore led the league for several weeks, and were never out of the top three all season. Blockhouse Bay recovered from a start which saw them lying ninth after eight games, but there were no losses in the last ten matches and the Bay steadily climbed the table to third.

Caversham, on their return to the league, managed to surprise by finishing fourth despite only winning four games — under the old system of two points for a win (which was used until the start of the 1983 league), they managed to survive on the strength of the large number of tied matches. Behind them came Mount Wellington, an unusual mid-table position for the perennial title-challengers. Despite having eleven current or former internationals in their squad, it was their inability to find the net on a regular basis which led to their lowly placing. Stop Out suffered a poor late-season slump which saw them slip from second to sixth over the last month of the competition.

Eastern Suburbs finished the season in a similar position to their 1974 position, as did Gisborne City: low but safe from relegation. Gisborne started the year well and were third halfway through the season, but four points from their last ten games sent them plummeting down the table. After 1974's heroics New Brighton returned to their familiar position on the brink of relegation, but again managed to hold on to their league status. They were rock bottom for most of the season, but managed to clinch a win in their final match to survive and consign Wellington City to the drop. City finally succumbed after six mediocre seasons, failing to avoid the drop they had narrowly averted in 1971.

== League table ==
Pos	Team	Pld	W	D	L	GF	GA	GR	Pts
1	Christchurch United (C)	18	11	4	3	35	16	2.188	26
2	North Shore United	18	8	7	3	33	18	1.833	23
3	Bay Olympic	18	9	5	4	29	21	1.381	23
4	Caversham	18	4	10	4	21	19	1.105	18
5	Mount Wellington	18	7	4	7	19	19	1.000	18
6	Stop Out	18	7	4	7	22	24	0.917	18
7	Eastern Suburbs	18	7	3	8	24	33	0.727	17
8	Gisborne City	18	5	4	9	13	25	0.520	14
9	New Brighton	18	4	4	10	18	28	0.643	12
10	Wellington City (R)	18	3	5	10	18	29	0.621	11

Rules for classification: 1) points; 2) goal ratio.
(C) Champions; (R) Relegated

== Sources ==
- Hilton, T. (1991) An association with soccer. Auckland: The New Zealand Football Association. ISBN 0-473-01291-X.
