= 1999 New Zealand island soccer leagues =

New Zealand island soccer leagues
- Season: 1999
- Champions: Central United

In 1999, two New Zealand island soccer leagues were run to replace the National Summer Soccer League which had finished at the end of the 1998 season. The two leagues, one for the North Island (the NISL) and one for the South Island (the SISL) were followed by a play-off between the two champion sides to determine the national champions. The games were mainly played during winter, in direct contrast to the previous summer league.

The format proved to be both controversial and unpopular, and from 2000 a New Zealand National Soccer League returned. Participants in the 2000 league were the top seven teams in the 1999 NISL and the top three teams in the 1999 SISL.

== North Island Soccer League ==
=== Participants ===
Twelve teams took part in the NISL. These included five from the northern region (Central United, Melville United, Mount Wellington, North Shore United, and Waitakere City) and two from the central region (Miramar Rangers and Napier City Rovers) which had been participants in the 1998 National Summer Soccer League.

The remaining five teams were promoted from the Northern and Central Leagues (Metro were Northern League champions; Western Suburbs FC, Lower Hutt City, Manawatu AFC, and Wellington Olympic were first, second, fourth, and fifth respectively in the Central League). It is unclear why Waterside Karori, who finished third in the Central League, were not promoted to the NISL.

The composition of the league included five Auckland teams, four Wellington teams, plus one team each from Hamilton, Palmerston North, and Napier.

Pos	Team	Pld	W	D	L	GF	GA	GD	Pts	Qualification or relegation
1	Central United (C)	22	16	2	4	69	31	+38	50	Qualified for National Final
2	Waitakere City	22	13	2	7	65	47	+18	41	
3	Napier City Rovers	22	12	4	6	59	36	+23	40	
4	Mount Wellington	22	11	3	8	52	43	+9	36	
5	Miramar Rangers	22	10	3	9	51	46	+5	33	
6	Metro	22	9	4	9	32	41	−9	31	
7	Red Sox Manawatu	22	7	8	7	30	38	−8	29	
8	Western Suburbs (R)	22	8	4	10	31	37	−6	28	Relegated to the 2000 Central Zone
9	Lower Hutt City (R)	22	6	8	8	39	48	−9	26	Relegated to the 2000 Central Zone
10	Wellington Olympic (R)	22	7	1	14	41	49	−8	22	Relegated to the 2000 Central Zone
11	North Shore United (R)	22	4	8	10	36	51	−15	20	Relegated to the 2000 Northern Zone
12	Melville United (R)	22	4	3	15	24	62	−38	15	Relegated to the 2000 Northern Zone

(C) Champions; (R) Relegated

== South Island Soccer League ==
=== Participants ===
Eight teams took part in the SISL. These included one team from the central region (Nelson Suburbs) which had been participants in the 1998 National Summer Soccer League, and the teams which finished in the top six places in the Southern League in 1998 (Dunedin Technical, Christchurch Technical, Southland United, Northern Hearts, Woolston WMC, and Caversham). The sixth team was a new composite team, Marlborough.

The composition of the league included two teams from Christchurch, two from Dunedin, and one each from Nelson, Timaru, Blenheim, and Invercargill.

Pos	Team	Pld	W	D	L	GF	GA	GD	Pts	Qualification or relegation
1	Dunedin Technical	14	10	3	1	43	15	+28	33	Qualified for National Final
2	Nelson Suburbs	14	10	2	2	45	23	+22	32	
3	Woolston WMC	14	9	2	3	43	21	+22	29	Merged to form Christchurch City
4	Caversham (R)	14	8	0	6	37	22	+15	24	Relegated to the 2000 South of the South League
5	Christchurch Technical	14	7	1	6	33	27	+6	22	Merged to form Christchurch City
6	Southland United (R)	14	4	2	8	28	39	−11	14	Relegated to the 2000 South of the South League
7	Northern Hearts (R)	14	2	1	11	16	65	−49	7	Relegated to the 2000 South of the South League
8	Marlborough (R)	14	0	1	13	18	51	−33	1	Relegated to the 2000 Southern Zone

Rules for classification: 1) points; 2) goal difference; 3) number of goals scored.
(R) Relegated

== National Final ==
8 September 1999

Central United	3 – 1	Dunedin Technical
Elrick ×3		Seales

North Harbour Stadium, North Shore
Attendance: 3,500
Referee: Bruce Grimshaw

By winning the title, Central United qualified for the 1999 Oceania Club Championship.
