= 1995 New Zealand Superclub League =

The 1995 Superclub competition was the third and final season of a nationwide association football club competition in New Zealand. It was won by Waitakere City.

== Structure ==
The competition was divided into three stages. In the first phase three regional round-robin leagues were played, with each team playing every other team home and away. The top teams from this stage progressed to a national league; the bottom teams were relegated to lower regional leagues. The Northern and Southern Leagues each contained ten teams, the Central League contained eleven.

The top eight teams (three from the northern and central regions and two from the southern region) then took part in the national league stage, with each team playing every other team once. Finally, the top four teams played a knockout competition to decide the champion. This involved the top two teams from the national league phase playing each other, and third and fourth place also playing each other. The winner of the match between first and second progressed through to the final; the loser of that match met the winner of the other match to decide the other finalist.

There was considerable reorganisation of the regional leagues at the end of the 1995 season, with several teams withdrawing from the following season's league. This fact, coupled with the clearly reduced standard of play in the national stage of the competition (diluted by the large number of teams involved in the competition) led to the creation of a new interim league, the National Summer Soccer League, which began in 1996.

== Regional leagues ==
=== Northern League ===
Pos	Team	Pld	W	D	L	GF	GA	GD	Pts
1	Waitakere City (A)	18	15	2	1	76	10	+66	47
2	North Shore United (A)	18	11	4	3	48	20	+28	37
3	Waikato United (Note: Waikato United merged with Melville AFC at the end of the season to become Melville United) (A)	18	11	2	5	47	16	+31	35
4	Ellerslie	18	11	0	7	58	28	+30	33
5	Mount Wellington	18	10	2	6	48	33	+15	32
6	Central United	18	7	4	7	34	30	+4	25
7	Papatoetoe	18	7	1	10	21	52	−31	22
8	Mount Maunganui	18	6	2	10	29	31	−2	20
9	Manurewa	18	2	1	15	15	68	−53	7
10	Mount Albert-Ponsonby (R)	18	0	2	16	9	97	−88	2

Rules for classification: 1) points; 2) goal difference; 3) number of goals scored.
(A) Advance to a further round; (R) Relegated

=== Central League ===
Pos	Team	Pld	W	D	L	GF	GA	GD	Pts
1	Napier City Rovers (A)	20	16	1	3	66	23	+43	49
2	Miramar Rangers (A)	20	14	3	3	49	31	+18	45
3	Nelson United (Note: Nelson United withdrew from the 1996 competition) (A)	20	13	4	3	47	20	+27	43
4	Wellington United	20	13	0	7	45	24	+21	39
5	Wellington Olympic	20	9	3	8	41	29	+12	30
6	Wanganui East Athletic	20	9	1	10	43	43	0	28
7	Petone	20	5	6	9	21	29	−8	21
8	Lower Hutt City	20	5	4	11	19	30	−11	19
9	Tawa	20	5	4	11	21	42	−21	19
10	Red Sox Manawatu	20	3	4	13	17	50	−33	13
11	New Plymouth Rangers (R)	20	2	2	16	14	62	−48	8

Rules for classification: 1) points; 2) goal difference; 3) number of goals scored.
(A) Advance to a further round; (R) Relegated

=== Southern League ===
Pos	Team	Pld	W	D	L	GF	GA	GD	Pts
1	Roslyn-Wakari (Note: Both Roslyn-Wakari and Burnside United withdrew from the 1996 regional competition) (A)	18	15	3	0	58	13	+45	48
2	Woolston WMC (A)	18	12	3	3	37	15	+22	39
3	Rangers	18	12	2	4	40	18	+22	38
4	Christchurch Technical	18	11	3	4	54	25	+29	36
5	Dunedin Technical	18	8	3	7	35	23	+12	27
6	Christchurch United	18	8	2	8	25	21	+4	26
7	New Brighton	18	5	2	11	29	46	−17	17
8	Burnside	18	5	1	12	19	41	−22	16
9	Halswell United	18	3	1	14	20	61	−41	10
10	Cashmere Wanderers (R)	18	0	2	16	9	63	−54	2

Rules for classification: 1) points; 2) goal difference; 3) number of goals scored.
(A) Advance to a further round; (R) Relegated

== National League ==
=== League table ===
Pos	Team	Pld	W	D	L	GF	GA	GD	Pts
1	Waitakere City (A)	7	5	2	0	23	8	+15	17
2	North Shore United (A)	7	3	3	1	15	10	+5	12
3	Waikato United (A)	7	3	2	2	11	8	+3	11
4	Napier City Rovers (A)	7	3	1	3	11	9	+2	10
5	Miramar Rangers	7	3	1	3	11	11	0	10
6	Nelson United	7	3	1	3	10	14	−4	10
7	Roslyn-Wakari	7	1	2	4	10	19	−9	5
8	Woolston WMC	7	1	0	6	9	21	−12	3

Rules for classification: 1) points; 2) goal difference; 3) number of goals scored.
(A) Advance to a further round

== Knockout phase ==
=== Playoffs ===
22 October 1995

Waitakere City	3 – 0	North Shore United

22 October 1995

Waikato United	1 – 0	Napier City Rovers

27 October 1995

North Shore United	1 – 1 (aet)*	Waikato United

*Waikato United won 5-4 on penalties

=== Final ===
4 November 1995

Waitakere City	4 – 0	Waikato United
Jorgensen, Gray, McClennan, T Edge

Bill McKinlay Park, Auckland
