= 1973 New Zealand National Soccer League =

New Zealand National Soccer League
- Season: 1973
- Champions: Christchurch United
- Relegated: Caversham

The 1973 New Zealand National Soccer League was the fourth season of a nationwide round-robin club competition in New Zealand football.

== Promotion and relegation ==
Auckland City FC finished last in the 1972 league, but did not enter the play-off series for a place in the 1973 league. Neither did any team from the Southern regional competition. As such, the play-offs became a simple home and away series between the winners of the northern and central regional leagues, Hamilton and Wellington Diamond United. When both ties finished in 1–1 draws, a replay on neutral venue was played to decide the tie. This took place at Wembley park in Wanganui, and saw WDU victorious by two goals to one.

== Team performance ==
Christchurch United became the first team from outside Auckland to win the title, which they did through their impressive home performance (eight wins, one draw, no losses), and amassing a league record number of points. The gap between them and second was a then-record eight points. Much of the season's excitement came immediately below Christchurch, with five teams being separated by a single point. Mount Wellington managed to just head off Auckland neighbours Blockhouse Bay on goal average. Gisborne City finally broke into the top four at the expense of Eastern Suburbs. Also on 20 points was newly promoted Wellington Diamond United, who produced the first real competitive showing in the league from a team from the capital.

The long rivalry between Christchurch United and Mount Wellington was to the fore this season, but the loss of several Mount players to World Cup qualification matches hit hard, and they bwere unable to produce a performance to match the South Islanders. Blockhouse Bay's season was marred by a mid-season slump, but they recovered well enough to finish in the top three. Gisborne left it to the last moment to record a fourth-place finish, via a controversial penalty in the dying moments of its last match of the season against Wellington City. The highlight of Gisborne's season was its away form, with only one loss on the road. Eastern Suburbs started the season very poorly and were in danger of relegation at the halfway mark with just six points. Their season was also marred off the pitch by financial problems.

The bottom four teams were all strugglers from the previous season, but this time there was no Auckland City to keep them all off the bottom. Stop Out started the season and finished the season with a run of three wins at both ends of the season, but the twelve remaining matches produced only one win and three draws. Wellington City also had its moments near the top of the table, trailing Christchurch by just two points as the season neared the home straight. It then completed its campaign with a disastrous run of seven straight losses. Again New Brighton narrowly survived, but this year it would be Caversham who would go down; they had a far worse season than fellow South Islanders Christchurch United, netting a record low of just six goals in 18 matches and failing to pick up a single away point.

== League table ==
Pos	Team	Pld	W	D	L	GF	GA	GR	Pts
1	Christchurch United (C)	18	13	3	2	38	11	3.455	29
2	Mount Wellington	18	10	1	7	40	21	1.905	21
3	Bay Olympic	18	9	3	6	25	22	1.136	21
4	Gisborne City	18	8	4	6	33	26	1.269	20
5	Eastern Suburbs	18	9	2	7	30	30	1.000	20
6	Wellington United	18	8	4	6	21	27	0.778	20
7	Stop Out	18	7	3	8	32	28	1.143	17
8	Wellington City	18	6	2	10	29	33	0.879	14
9	New Brighton	18	5	3	10	25	43	0.581	13
10	Caversham (R)	18	2	1	15	6	38	0.158	5

Rules for classification: 1) points; 2) goal ratio.
(C) Champions; (R) Relegated

== Sources ==
- Hilton, T. (1991) An association with soccer. Auckland: The New Zealand Football Association. ISBN 0-473-01291-X.
