= 1996 National Summer Soccer League =

The 1996 National Summer Soccer League was the inaugural season of a short-lived nationwide association football club competition in New Zealand. The competition replaced the Superclub competition, which operated until 1995. The 1996 series was won by Waitakere City.

== Structure ==
The league was an invitation-only competition, with no promotion or relegation taking place. Matches took place between January and May 1996. The competition was divided into two stages. In the first phase the ten teams took part in a round-robin league, with each team playing every other team home and away.

The top four teams from this stage progressed to a play-off series. This involved the top two teams from the league phase playing each other, and third and fourth place also playing each other. The winner of the match between first and second progressed through to the final; the loser of that match met the winner of the other match to decide the other finalist.

A unique system of awarding points was used for this competition. Teams were awarded four points for a win and one for a draw. In drawn matches, a penalty shoot-out (minimum of three shots per side) would then take place, with the winning side awarded a bonus point.

== League stage ==
=== League table ===
| Pos | Team | Pld | W | D | L | GF | GA | GD | BP | Pts | Qualification |
|---|---|---|---|---|---|---|---|---|---|---|---|
| 1 | Miramar Rangers | 18 | 11 | 2 | 5 | 45 | 29 | +16 | 0 | 46 | 1996 National Soccer League Finals |
| 2 | Waitakere City (C) | 18 | 10 | 3 | 5 | 48 | 32 | +16 | 2 | 45 | 1996 National Soccer League Champions |
| 3 | North Shore United | 18 | 9 | 5 | 4 | 37 | 28 | +9 | 3 | 44 | 1996 National Soccer League Finals |
| 4 | Wellington United | 18 | 9 | 4 | 5 | 38 | 27 | +11 | 3 | 43 | 1996 National Soccer League Finals |
| 5 | Napier City Rovers | 18 | 9 | 4 | 5 | 45 | 28 | +17 | 2 | 42 | |
| 6 | Central United | 18 | 8 | 5 | 5 | 33 | 23 | +10 | 4 | 41 | |
| 7 | Nelson Suburbs | 18 | 8 | 2 | 8 | 35 | 46 | −11 | 0 | 34 | |
| 8 | Waikato United | 18 | 5 | 1 | 12 | 30 | 44 | −14 | 0 | 21 | |
| 9 | Mount Maunganui | 18 | 3 | 2 | 13 | 21 | 45 | −24 | 1 | 15 | |
| 10 | Woolston WMC | 18 | 3 | 2 | 13 | 25 | 55 | −30 | 0 | 14 | |

Rules for classification: 1) points; 2) goal difference; 3) number of goals scored.
(C) Champions

== Finals ==
=== Playoffs ===
5 May 1996

| Miramar Rangers | 0 – 1 | Waitakere City |
|---|---|---|
| | | Gray |

Wellington
5 May 1996

| North Shore United | 0 – 0 (aet)* | Wellington United |

Auckland

*North Shore United won 9–8 on penalties

12 May 1996

| Miramar Rangers | 2 – 0 | North Shore United |
|---|---|---|
| Elliott, McGarry |

Wellington

=== Final ===
19 May 1996

| Waitakere City | 5 – 2 | Miramar Rangers |
|---|---|---|
| McClennan ×2, Jorgensen, N Harlock, Elrick | | McGarry ×2 |

Bill McKinlay Park, Auckland

== Records and statistics ==
Top scorers

- Martin Akers (Napier City Rovers), 18 goals
- Darren McClennan (Waitakere City), 14 goals
- D Brown (Waikato United), 13 goals
- Batram Suri (Nelson Suburbs), 13 goals
- Thomas Edge (Waitakere City), 11 goals

Biggest winning margin

- Central United 8, Nelson Suburbs 1

Highest aggregate score

- Central United 8, Nelson Suburbs 1
- North Shore United 7, Woolston WMC 2
