= 1972 New Zealand National Soccer League =

New Zealand National Soccer League
- Season: 1972
- Champions: Mount Wellington
- Relegated: Auckland City

The 1972 New Zealand National Soccer League was the third season of a nationwide round-robin club competition in New Zealand football.

== Promotion and relegation ==
Western Suburbs FC finished last in the 1971 league, and joined the winners of the Northern, Central, and Southern leagues — Takapuna City (North Shore), Waterside (Wellington), and New Brighton (Christchurch) respectively — in a play-off series to decide the team which would be granted entry to the national league. Teams all played each other in home and away ties, as a result of which New Brighton gained entry to the league.

There were two further changes to the league from the previous year; Dunedin Suburbs disbanded as a team, their place being taken by the Caversham side who had been instrumental in this short-lived union, and Mount Albert-Ponsonby also renamed themselves - briefly - as Auckland City.

== Team performance ==
A very close finish to the season saw three teams at the top finish within one point of each other. Again it was Auckland teams plus Christchurch United who dominated the table, with Mount Wellington finishing strongly to pip Blockhouse Bay to the title. The Mount's win was largely the work of coach Ken Armstrong, and was underpinned by an excellent home record, with eight wins and one solitary loss. Blockhouse Bay's Ian Ormond was by far the league's top scorer, his 22 goals being one more than the entire Auckland City tally. A final match scoreless draw against Gisborne City was to cost them the league. They led the table at that point, but Mount Wellington won its two outstanding matches to take the trophy.

Christchurch United and Eastern Suburbs both held the lead at different points of the season, but a poor finish to the season for Suburbs saw them drop to fourth. Gisborne City's mid-table finish was the result of good home form but poor away form. Gisborne's season saw the arrival of a man who would have a big influence on New Zealand football, Kevin Fallon, who played his first game in the league mid-season.

The two Wellingtonian teams, Stop Out and Wellington City again struggled, neither of them looking like title contenders, but improving on their previous league seasons. Caversham started brightly with five wins in its first seven games, but that's where their form ran out, and they managed just three points in the rest of the season. They were safe from relegation, however, since the bottom two clubs both had far worse seasons. New Brighton only managed one win all season, and only survived in the league through Auckland City's worse goal record.

== League table ==
| Pos | Team | Pld | W | D | L | GF | GA | GR | Pts |
|---|---|---|---|---|---|---|---|---|---|
| 1 | Mount Wellington (C) | 18 | 13 | 2 | 3 | 46 | 19 | 2.421 | 28 |
| 2 | Bay Olympic | 18 | 12 | 4 | 2 | 35 | 17 | 2.059 | 28 |
| 3 | Christchurch United | 18 | 12 | 3 | 3 | 42 | 23 | 1.826 | 27 |
| 4 | Eastern Suburbs | 18 | 9 | 4 | 5 | 42 | 28 | 1.500 | 22 |
| 5 | Gisborne City | 18 | 6 | 5 | 7 | 32 | 28 | 1.143 | 17 |
| 6 | Stop Out | 18 | 5 | 6 | 7 | 27 | 30 | 0.900 | 16 |
| 7 | Wellington City | 18 | 6 | 3 | 9 | 23 | 26 | 0.885 | 15 |
| 8 | Caversham | 18 | 5 | 3 | 10 | 25 | 43 | 0.581 | 13 |
| 9 | New Brighton | 18 | 1 | 5 | 12 | 23 | 45 | 0.511 | 7 |
| 10 | Auckland City (R) | 18 | 2 | 3 | 13 | 21 | 57 | 0.368 | 7 |

Rules for classification: 1) points; 2) goal ratio.
(C) Champions; (R) Relegated

== Records and statistics ==
Top scorer

- Ian Ormond (Blockhouse Bay): 22 goals

== Sources ==
- Hilton, T. (1991) An association with soccer. Auckland: The New Zealand Football Association. ISBN 0-473-01291-X.
