= 1977 New Zealand National Soccer League =

The 1977 New Zealand National Soccer League was the eighth season of a nationwide round-robin club competition in New Zealand football. An expansion by two teams meant that it was the first year in which twelve teams took part. Prize money was significantly increased for the top three clubs, and the number of teams relegated increased from one to three, these being automatically replaced by the winners of the three regional leagues.

== Promotion and relegation ==
With an expanded league, there was no promotion and relegation play-off series for 1977 league places. Gisborne City, relegated in 1976, returned to the regional league, and three new teams took their place. These were the winners of the northern, central, and southern leagues (Hamilton, Nelson United, and Dunedin City respectively).

== Team performance ==
No one team dominated the 1977 league, which was won narrowly by North Shore United over Stop Out. Shore ran hot and cold, with a string of six wins early in the season followed by a string of lacklustre performances which saw them slide down the table. Hutt Valley's Stop Out showed a marked improvement from the previous season, when they only narrowly avoided relegation. Trans Tours Christchurch United also rebounded from the previous year's poor showing. Newcomers Hamilton (soccer) completed the top four. Two-thirds of the way through the season they were leading, but one win in their last seven games ended their title challenge.

Wellington Diamond United and Mount Wellington completed the top half of the table. WDU's season was highlighted by a 7-3 win over New Brighton, a goal aggregate record for the league up until that point. The Mount's season was badly affected by the loss of players to qualifying matches for the 1978 FIFA World Cup, and a goal drought late in the season cost them dearly. Nelson United started and ended the season brightly, but the middle of the season saw a disastrous run of ten matches without a win, leaving them seventh at the season's end. They were followed by Blockhouse Bay, who recorded their lowest league position yet, largely due to the loss of key players to other sides, notably Ian and Duncan Ormond, who had moved to North Shore and Stop out respectively.

Eastern Suburbs finished just above New Brighton, avoiding relegation only by way of a better goal ratio. This was largely the result of two big wins by Suburbs over the Seasiders in which they had scored eleven goals in total and only had three scored against them. It was a bad year for South Island sides other than Christchurch United — New Brighton were accompanied into the regional leagues by the two Dunedin sides, Dunedin City and Caversham. City were doomed by their terrible start to the season. Nine straight losses meant they were always going to have a struggle to catch up, and despite a very strong finish to the season they failed to make up the ground. Neighbours Caversham had as forgettable an end to the season as city's start to it, failing to find the net in their last eight games.

== League table ==
Pos	Team	Pld	W	D	L	GF	GA	GR	Pts
1	North Shore United (C)	22	14	3	5	37	25	1.480	31
2	Stop Out	22	11	8	3	40	28	1.429	30
3	Christchurch United	22	9	9	4	32	17	1.882	27
4	Melville United	22	9	9	4	41	22	1.864	27
5	Wellington United	22	8	7	7	41	31	1.323	23
6	Mount Wellington	22	8	7	7	27	21	1.286	23
7	Nelson United	22	6	9	7	22	29	0.759	21
8	Bay Olympic	22	7	7	8	23	33	0.697	21
9	Eastern Suburbs	22	6	5	11	31	36	0.861	17
10	New Brighton (R)	22	5	7	10	24	36	0.667	17
11	Dunedin City (R)	22	5	7	10	19	30	0.633	17
12	Caversham (R)	22	3	4	15	14	43	0.326	10

Rules for classification: 1) points; 2) goal ratio.
(C) Champions; (R) Relegated

== Sources ==
- Hilton, T. (1991) An association with soccer. Auckland: The New Zealand Football Association. ISBN 0-473-01291-X.
