= 1982 New Zealand National Soccer League =

The 1982 New Zealand National Soccer League was the 13th season of a nationwide round-robin club competition in New Zealand football. Mount Wellington comfortably won the league for a fifth time, finishing seven points clear of second-placed Hanimex North Shore United. This was the last season in which a win scored two points; from 1983 wins were worth three points.

== Promotion and relegation ==
Promotion was automatic, with the three lowest placed sides in the 1981 league (Takapuna City, Woolston WMC, and Rangers) replaced by the winners of the northern, central, and southern leagues (East Coast Bays, Napier City Rovers, and Invercargill Thistle respectively).

== Team performance ==
The league's top five positions were filled by the same teams which had finished in the top five in the 1981 league, though those five teams finished in a different order. The league overall was marked by a high proportion of drawn games (39 out of 132 fixtures), and was severely disrupted by New Zealand's participation in the 1982 FIFA World Cup in Spain.

Mount Wellington comfortably finished top, remaining undefeated at home and only losing one away game. The Mount's Keith Nelson was the league's top scorer with 15 goals, the fourth time he had achieved that feat. Seven points back were Hanimex North Shore United, who had remarkably different home and away records. They won 10 of their 11 home games, but only won one on the road, drawing seven. Dunedin City held on to third place from Gisborne City. The Dunedinites' season was marked with a large number of low-scoring games, over half of their matches finishing either 1–0 or 1–1. As in the 1981 season, Gisborne were badly affected by the World Cup, which left it with a severe backlog of games. Despite this, they still managed to finish fourth.

1981 Champions Wellington Diamond United were let down by their poor away form. Only one away win meant they could finish no higher than fifth. The team lacked striking power which further hampered their chances. Miramar Rangers started the season slowly, but improved in form as the season progressed to finish two places higher than in their debut season of 1981. Christchurch United's season was marked by a plethora of draws. It managed to recover from the danger of relegation mid-season through a nine-match unbeaten run at the end of the campaign. Napier City Rovers' first match in the top flight saw them docked a point for fielding an unregistered player—the 1–1 result (against Manurewa) was subsequently amended to a 1–0 win to the Aucklanders. This was the first time such a point deduction had been made in the league's history. Despite this, Napier had a satisfactory debut season, only losing one home game and scoring more goals than several higher-finishing teams.

Manurewa was, like Gisborne, badly affected by the New Zealand World Cup campaign, and its backlog of matches left it struggling to avoid relegation. A run of four straight wins aided its cause, and even a late-season slump was not enough to see it go down. After several seasons in the lower reaches of the table, Hamilton's luck finally ran out and they were consigned to the drop along with league newcomers East Coast Bays and Invercargill Thistle. Bays' season started with five straight losses, and despite a brief rally after that they soon slipped back down with a run of poor results. The final position went to the league's southernmost ever participant. Thistle's season started and ended with good results, but between these was a dreadful succession of results gaining the club just six points in 19 fixtures.

== League table ==
| Pos | Team | Pld | W | D | L | GF | GA | GD | Pts |
|---|---|---|---|---|---|---|---|---|---|
| 1 | Mount Wellington (C) | 22 | 15 | 6 | 1 | 52 | 15 | +37 | 36 |
| 2 | North Shore United | 22 | 11 | 7 | 4 | 44 | 25 | +19 | 29 |
| 3 | Dunedin City | 22 | 10 | 7 | 5 | 30 | 21 | +9 | 27 |
| 4 | Gisborne City | 22 | 10 | 7 | 5 | 39 | 31 | +8 | 27 |
| 5 | Wellington United | 22 | 8 | 8 | 6 | 29 | 23 | +6 | 24 |
| 6 | Miramar Rangers | 22 | 9 | 4 | 9 | 30 | 32 | −2 | 22 |
| 7 | Christchurch United | 22 | 5 | 11 | 6 | 27 | 26 | +1 | 21 |
| 8 | Napier City Rovers | 22 | 7 | 7 | 8 | 36 | 40 | −4 | 21 (Note: Napier City Rovers 1-1 draw with Manurewa altered to 0-1 for fielding an ineligible player. Table has been adjusted to reflect this change.) |
| 9 | Manurewa | 22 | 8 | 5 | 9 | 31 | 33 | −2 | 21 |
| 10 | Melville United (R) | 22 | 3 | 7 | 12 | 21 | 39 | −18 | 13 |
| 11 | East Coast Bays (R) | 22 | 4 | 4 | 14 | 23 | 44 | −21 | 12 |
| 12 | Invercargill Thistle (R) | 22 | 3 | 5 | 14 | 18 | 51 | −33 | 11 |

Rules for classification: 1) points; 2) goal difference; 3) number of goals scored.
(C) Champions; (R) Relegated

== Records and statistics ==
Top scorer

- Keith Nelson (Mount Wellington) – 15 goals

== Sources ==
- Hilton, T. (1991) An association with soccer. Auckland: The New Zealand Football Association. ISBN 0-473-01291-X.
