= Mark Armstrong (footballer) =

New Zealand footballer

Personal information
- Full name: Mark J Armstrong
- Place of birth: New Zealand
- Position: Forward

Senior career*
Years	Team	Apps	(Gls)
ante 1980–post 1989	Manurewa		

International career
1980	New Zealand	7	(3)
- * Club domestic league appearances and goals

Mark Armstrong is a former association football player who represented New Zealand at international level.

Armstrong made his full All Whites debut in a 1-1 draw with Fiji on 18 February 1980 and ended his international playing career with seven A-international caps and three goals to his credit, his final cap an appearance in a 0-3 loss to Canada on 18 September that same year.

Armstrong was the first player to score 100 goals in the New Zealand National Soccer League, completing this feat during the 1989 season.
