= 1970 New Zealand National Soccer League =

New Zealand National Soccer League
- Season: 1970
- Champions: Blockhouse Bay

The 1970 New Zealand National Soccer League was the inaugural season of a nationwide round-robin club competition in New Zealand football. The league's initial sponsors were Rothmans (NZ) Ltd, and the league was thus commonly known as the Rothmans National League. Rothmans retained naming sponsorship rights until 1987 when Air New Zealand took over as principal sponsor.

== Background ==
Plans for a national league had been drawn up in 1963 after increasing calls for such a competition from the late 1950s onwards. Plans were delayed by a full programme of overseas games for the NZFA during 1964, but moves towards a viable national league were put in place with the introduction of three regional leagues for the northern, central, and southern regions of the country in 1968. It was the final standing in these leagues in the 1969 season which were to provide the eight teams to compete in the 1970 national league, with four teams from the Central league, three from the Northern League, and one from the Southern League granted national league spots. The qualifying sides were as follows:

Northern League

- Mount Wellington (Auckland)
- Eastern Suburbs (Auckland)
- Blockhouse Bay (Auckland)

Central League

- Western Suburbs FC (Porirua)
- Stop Out (Lower Hutt)
- Gisborne City (Gisborne)
- Hungaria (Wellington)

Southern League

- Christchurch United (Christchurch)

== Team performance ==
The inaugural season was dominated by teams from Auckland and Wellington, each of which had three teams. It was an Auckland side which would finish on top, with favourites and 1969 Northern League champions Blockhouse Bay triumphant. For much of the season it was to be fellow Queen City side Eastern Suburbs were the main threat for the title, but both Christchurch United and Mount Wellington performed well in the second half of the season, with neither side losing a game in the home stretch until the last game of the season, the league's first floodlit game, which saw Christchurch beat the Mount at home in an eight-goal spectacular in front of the season's biggest crowd of 3,000.

By comparison with the Auckland sides, the Wellington trio had lacklustre seasons. The four teams from the central region filled the lower half of the table, and the gap between them and the top four — in both points and form — was substantial.

== League table ==
Pos	Team	Pld	W	D	L	GF	GA	GR	Pts
1	Blockhouse Bay (C)	14	10	2	2	40	16	2.500	22
2	Eastern Suburbs	14	10	2	2	33	17	1.941	22
3	Christchurch United	14	9	2	3	40	26	1.538	20
4	Mount Wellington	14	7	3	4	35	33	1.061	17
5	Stop Out	14	4	2	8	25	38	0.658	10
6	Gisborne City	14	3	3	8	22	31	0.710	9
7	Hungaria	14	3	3	8	24	36	0.667	9
8	Western Suburbs	14	1	1	12	18	40	0.450	3

Rules for classification: 1) points; 2) goal ratio.
(C) Champions

No teams were relegated at the end of the 1970 season, as it was decided to increase the size of the league to ten teams from 1971.
