= 1979 New Zealand National Soccer League =

The 1979 New Zealand National Soccer League was the tenth season of a nationwide round-robin club competition in New Zealand football. It produced the biggest winning margin in the league's history, with Mount Wellington never being in serious danger of finishing anywhere but first.

== Promotion and relegation ==
Promotion was automatic, with the three lowest placed sides in the 1978 league (Hamilton, Waterside, and Woolston WMC) replaced by the winners of the northern, central, and southern leagues (Manurewa, Manawatu United, and Dunedin City respectively).

== Team performance ==
Mount Wellington produced an emphatic performance to win the league by an unprecedented 14 points, a bigger gap than that between second and last. They won all eleven of their home games, scoring 34 and only letting in four. They also only lost two games away, to Dunedin City and to Nelson united — United proving the Mount's nemesis for the third year in a row. The race for second proved tense, with Christchurch United heading off a pack of teams separated by only a couple of points. North Shore United — who were to go under the sponsorship-related name of Hanimex United from this year until 1985 — finished third, level on points with newly promoted Manurewa and Dunedin City.

In mid-table, Nelson United improved one place on the previous season to finish sixth, its good home form buoying it up but its poor away record proving a major hindrance. They were followed by Wellington Diamond United, who saw a late slump in their form after a good opening to the season which briefly had them in second place. Blockhouse Bay were fortunate to finish eighth, a late rally moving them off the foot of the table. Stop Out also narrowly avoided the drop, staying up by virtue of a better goal difference than Manawatu United.

Manawatu United's first season in the league proved to be their last until 1986. A dreadful start to the season left them languishing with just four points from their first 11 matches, and despite a greatly improved second half to the season the gap was too much to bridge. They were joined in relegation by Courier Rangers, who started the season brightly but then had a poor run of form which saw only one win in their last 17 games. Last of all were 1971 champions Eastern Suburbs, whose gradual progress down the table since that year finally saw the seam at the foot of the table.

== League table ==
Pos	Team	Pld	W	D	L	GF	GA	GD	Pts
1	Mount Wellington (C)	22	20	0	2	68	17	+51	40
2	Christchurch United	22	10	6	6	47	30	+17	26
3	North Shore United	22	10	4	8	37	29	+8	24
4	Manurewa	22	9	6	7	33	28	+5	24
5	Dunedin City	22	10	4	8	39	44	−5	24
6	Nelson United	22	9	4	9	36	30	+6	22
7	Wellington United	22	7	7	8	23	34	−11	21
8	Bay Olympic	22	6	6	10	31	41	−10	18
9	Stop Out	22	5	7	10	27	35	−8	17
10	Red Sox Manawatu (R)	22	6	5	11	22	33	−11	17
11	Courier Rangers (R)	22	4	8	10	26	48	−22	16
12	Eastern Suburbs (R)	22	4	7	11	27	47	−20	15

Rules for classification: 1) points; 2) goal difference; 3) number of goals scored.
(C) Champions; (R) Relegated

== Sources ==
- Hilton, T. (1991) An association with soccer. Auckland: The New Zealand Football Association. ISBN 0-473-01291-X.
