= 2002 New Zealand National Soccer League =

New Zealand National Soccer League
- Season: 2002
- Champions: Miramar Rangers

The 2002 New Zealand National Club Championship, also known, due to naming-rights sponsorship, as the Southern Trust National League was the third season of a nationwide club competition in New Zealand football. The competition was won by Miramar Rangers.

The league was played mainly during autumn, with matches played from February to June, and was run in two stages. In the first stage, each team in the ten-team league played every other team home and away. In the second stage, the top four teams entered a knockout competition, with third place playing fourth place in one match and first playing second in the other, with home advantage being decided by final league position. The winners of the first against second match progressed straight through to the final; the losers of that match met the winners of the other match to decide the other finalist.

== Promotion and relegation ==
Ten teams took part in the 2002 league. Eight of these remained from the previous season. Christchurch City withdrew from the competition, replaced by a composite team, Canterbury United, drawing players from all of Christchurch's main clubs. Metro were relegated and withdrew from the promotion play-offs against the winners of a competition between the northern, central, and southern regional competition winners. The play-off games between the three regional champions were played at Newtown Park, Wellington during August and September 2001.

Team 1	Score	Team 2
North Shore United	2 – 0	Caversham
Wellington United	5 – 0	Caversham
Wellington United	0 – 2	North Shore United

The tenth place in the 2002 league was thus gained by North Shore United.

Waitakere City finished last in 2002, and entered the play-off series with the winners of the northern, central, and southern regional leagues.

== League table ==
Pos	Team	Pld	W	D	L	GF	GA	GD	Pts	Qualification or relegation
1	Napier City Rovers	18	13	3	2	50	27	+23	42	2002 National Soccer League Finals
2	Miramar Rangers (C)	18	11	4	3	51	22	+29	37	2002 National Soccer League Finals
3	North Shore United	18	11	4	3	33	18	+15	37	2002 National Soccer League Finals
4	Tauranga City United	18	9	5	4	36	18	+18	32	2002 National Soccer League Finals
5	Canterbury United	18	8	4	6	31	30	+1	28	
6	Red Sox Manawatu	18	7	1	10	32	43	−11	22	
7	Central United	18	5	2	11	25	46	−21	17	
8	Dunedin Technical	18	4	3	11	19	32	−13	15	
9	University-Mount Wellington	18	3	6	9	21	36	−15	15	
10	Waitakere City (R)	18	2	2	14	18	44	−26	8	Relegated to the 2003 Northern Zone

Rules for classification: 1) points; 2) goal difference; 3) number of goals scored.
(C) Champions; (R) Relegated

== Finals ==
=== Bracket ===
Semifinals
Napier City Rovers	0
Miramar Rangers	3
North Shore United	0
Tauranga City United	1

Preliminary final
1	Napier City Rovers	5
4	Tauranga City United	3

Grand final
2	Miramar Rangers	3
1	Napier City Rovers	1

=== Play-offs ===
26 May 2002

Napier City Rovers	0 – 3	Miramar Rangers
		Ryan, Little, George

26 May 2002

North Shore United	0 – 1	Tauranga City United
		Derry

1 June 2002

Napier City Rovers	5 – 3	Tauranga City United
Smeltz 4, Birnie		Pilcher 2, Derry

=== Final ===
8 June 2002

Miramar Rangers	3 – 1	Napier City Rovers
Little, Thompson, George		Gearey

Newtown Park, Wellington
Referee: Steve Sargent

== Records and statistics ==
Biggest winning margin

- Canterbury United 0, Central United 7
- Central United 0, Tauranga City United 7

Highest aggregate score

- Central United 3, Miramar Rangers 5
- Napier City Rovers 5, Tauranga City United 3
