= 2003 New Zealand National Soccer League =

New Zealand National Soccer League
- Season: 2003
- Champions: Miramar Rangers

The 2003 New Zealand National Club Championship, also known, due to naming-rights sponsorship, as the Southern Trust National League, was the fourth and final season of a nationwide club competition in New Zealand football. The competition was won by Miramar Rangers.

The league was played mainly during autumn, with matches played from February to June, and was run in two stages. In the first stage, each team in the ten-team league played every other team home and away. In the second stage, the top four teams entered a knockout competition, with third place playing fourth place in one match and first playing second in the other, with home advantage being decided by final league position. The winners of the first against second match progressed straight through to the final; the losers of that match met the winners of the other match to decide the other finalist.

This was the last season of the league, which was replaced by the New Zealand Football Championship. It had become clear that teams were having to amalgamate to create financially viable strong teams to take part in the league, most notably the Canterbury and Auckland-area conglomerate teams Canterbury United and East Auckland. It was decided by the NZFA that an eight-team franchise-based national competition would be more viable and successful than a club based competition. Club-based teams returned to regional leagues, and became feeder clubs for the regional franchises. The new competition debuted in October 2004.

== Promotion and relegation ==
Ten teams took part in the 2002 league. Eight of these remained from the previous season. University-Mount Wellington withdrew from the competition, replaced by a composite team, East Auckland, drawing players from several Auckland clubs. Waitakere City were relegated, and took part in a promotion play-offs against the winners of the northern, central, and southern regional competitions (Glenfield Rovers, Western Suburbs FC, and Caversham respectively). The play-off games between Waitakere City the three regional champions were played at Bill McKinlay Park and Kiwitea Street in Auckland during September 2002.

Team 1	Score	Team 2
Caversham	3 – 2	Waitakere City
Western Suburbs FC	2 – 2	Glenfield Rovers
Caversham	3 – 0	Western Suburbs FC
Glenfield Rovers	1 – 3	Waitakere City
Caversham	2 – 1	Glenfield Rovers
Western Suburbs FC	2 – 1	Waitakere City

The tenth place in the 2002 league was thus gained by Caversham.

As this was the last season of the National Soccer League, there was no relegation, but all teams returned to the regional competitions at the end of the season.

== League table ==
Pos	Team	Pld	W	D	L	GF	GA	GD	Pts	Qualification
1	Miramar Rangers (C)	18	11	0	7	46	29	+17	33	2003 National Soccer League Finals
2	East Auckland	18	10	3	5	34	24	+10	33	2003 National Soccer League Finals
3	Central United	18	10	1	7	44	29	+15	31	2003 National Soccer League Finals
4	Napier City Rovers	18	9	2	7	29	28	+1	29	2003 National Soccer League Finals
5	Red Sox Manawatu	18	8	3	7	32	29	+3	27	
6	Canterbury United	18	7	5	6	34	34	0	26	
7	North Shore United	18	6	5	7	30	34	−4	23	
8	Caversham	18	5	5	8	19	26	−7	20	
9	Dunedin Technical	18	6	2	10	24	38	−14	20	
10	Tauranga City United	18	4	2	12	20	41	−21	14	

Rules for classification: 1) points; 2) goal difference; 3) number of goals scored.
(C) Champions

== Finals ==
=== Bracket ===
Semifinals
Miramar Rangers	0
East Auckland	2
Central United	3
Napier City Rovers	2

Preliminary final
1	Miramar Rangers	5
3	Central United	2

Grand final
2	East Auckland	2
1	Miramar Rangers	3

=== Play-offs ===
31 May 2003

Miramar Rangers	0 – 2	East Auckland
		Viljoen, Waugh

31 May 2003

Central United	3 – 2	Napier City Rovers
Campbell, Major, Sykes		McIvor, Johnston

8 June 2003

Miramar Rangers	5 – 2	Central United
Little ×2, Ryan ×2, Imam		Aliaga, Major

=== Final ===
15 June 2003

East Auckland	2 – 3	Miramar Rangers
Waetford (pen.), Waugh		Ryan ×3

North Harbour Stadium, North Shore City
Referee: Ian Walker

== Records and statistics ==
Biggest winning margin

- Central United 7, Tauranga City United 0

Highest aggregate score

- Canterbury United 5, Miramar Rangers 3
