= 1971 New Zealand National Soccer League =

New Zealand National Soccer League
- Season: 1971
- Champions: Eastern Suburbs
- Relegated: Western Suburbs

The 1971 New Zealand National Soccer League was the second season of a nationwide round-robin club competition in New Zealand football. The league was expanded at the end of the inaugural season, so there was no relegation from the 1970 league season. Hungaria, who had competed in the inaugural season, combined with Miramar Rangers to form a new composite league team, Wellington City. Though Miramar withdrew from the team after the 1971 season, the team continued to use the new name.

== Promotion to the national league ==
At the end of the 1970 season, the winners of the Northern, Central, and Southern leagues — Mount Albert-Ponsonby (Auckland), Waterside (Wellington), and Caversham (Dunedin) respectively — took part in a play-off series to decide the two teams which would be granted entry to the national league. the results were as follows:

Home team	Score	Away team
Mount Albert-Ponsonby	1 – 1	Waterside
Waterside	0 – 0	Caversham
Mount Albert-Ponsonby	2 – 0	Caversham
Caversham	4 – 1	Waterside
Waterside	0 – 3	Mount Albert-Ponsonby
Caversham	1 – 1	Mount Albert-Ponsonby

As a result of these matches, Mount Albert-Ponsonby and Caversham gained entry to the national league. In order to mount a stronger southern challenge, Caversham amalgamated with several other Dunedin-based sides to form Dunedin Suburbs; the team lasted for one season in this form before reverting to Caversham.

== Team performance ==
The same four teams dominated the league as in the inaugural season, but this time it was Eastern Suburbs who finished on top. An unbeaten run of twelve matches by Mount Wellington saw them move into second place, followed by Christchurch United and Blockhouse Bay. The league title came down to the last round of matches and a controversial yet thrilling between the top two sides. In front of an estimated crowd of 10,000 at Newmarket Park, the Mount had three goals disallowed yet still managed to draw against Suburbs 2-2. Despite still having one game in hand, the Mount needed a win to hang onto its title chances, and Suburbs were crowned champions. A personal milestone occurred for Eastern Suburbs' John Wrathall, who scored his 1000th goal in 26 years of senior football during Suburbs' 3–1 win against Mount Albert-Ponsonby.

The gap between the top four and the rest closed considerably over the debut season for Gisborne City, who finished comfortably fifth. below that was a major gap, however, with Dunedin Suburbs, Mount Albert-Ponsonby, Stop Out, Wellington City, and Western Suburbs FC all battling to avoid relegation. Wellington's teams struggled in the league for a second season, filling all three bottom places, and it was Porirua-based Western Suburbs which finished last on goal average. If goal difference had been employed — a system which was to be introduced for the 1978 league — they would have survived and it would have been City who went down.

== League table ==
Pos	Team	Pld	W	D	L	GF	GA	GR	Pts
1	Eastern Suburbs (C)	18	12	4	2	51	23	2.217	28
2	Mount Wellington	18	11	3	4	51	22	2.318	25
3	Christchurch United	18	9	5	4	43	20	2.150	23
4	Bay Olympic	18	9	4	5	45	25	1.800	22
5	Gisborne City	18	8	5	5	38	33	1.152	21
6	Caversham	18	6	3	9	25	44	0.568	15
7	Mount Albert-Ponsonby	18	4	4	10	20	32	0.625	12
8	Stop Out	18	3	6	9	25	45	0.556	12
9	Wellington City	18	4	3	11	21	50	0.420	11
10	Western Suburbs (R)	18	3	5	10	18	43	0.419	11

Rules for classification: 1) points; 2) goal ratio.
(C) Champions; (R) Relegated

== Sources ==
- Hilton, T. (1991) An association with soccer. Auckland: The New Zealand Football Association. ISBN 0-473-01291-X.
