= Kevin Fallon =

New Zealand football coach (born 1948)

Personal information
- Full name: Kevin Barry Fallon
- Date of birth: 3 December 1948 (age 77)
- Place of birth: Maltby, Yorkshire, England
- Position: Centre-half

Senior career*
Years	Team	Apps	(Gls)
1965–1967	Rotherham United	0	(0)
1967–1970	Sligo Rovers	67	(5)
1970–1971	Southend United	4	(0)
1972–1974	Ilkeston Town		
1972–1974	Gisborne City	9	(2)
1975 - 1977	Nelson United	30	
1978	Hamilton AFC		
1979 - 1983	Gisborne City	72	(8)

Managerial career
- 1974 -1976: Gisborne City
- 1975 - 1977: Nelson United
- 1978: Hamilton AFC
- 1979 -1986: Gisborne City
- 1985–1989: New Zealand
- 1987 - 1988: North Shore United
- Waikato United
- 2016–2017: Manukau City
- 2018–2019: Manukau United
- 2018–2020: Cook Islands
- * Club domestic league appearances and goals

Kevin Barry Fallon MNZM (born 3 December 1948) is an English-born football coach residing in New Zealand. He is the father of New Zealand international footballer Rory Fallon and former coach of the Cook Islands national football team but did not manage any official games for them.

== Career ==
Fallon spent most of his playing career outside of New Zealand at Sligo Rovers of Ireland. Fallon ended his career in NZ in 1979 with the now defunct Gisborne City.

Fallon was assistant coach to the John Adshead-led New Zealand national team, which qualified for the 1982 FIFA World Cup. Fallon took sole charge of the New Zealand side in May 1985 but failed to qualify for the 1986 FIFA World Cup. New Zealand won 19, drew 11 and lost 22 of his 52 games in charge.

In 1999 he managed hosts New Zealand at the FIFA U-17 World Championship of 1999 to third in Group A.

In 2001 he managed the professional team the Football Kingz FC. In 18 games managing the Football Kingz FC he won twice.

Also in 2001 he allegedly racially abused an opposing team when he admitted that he said “I told them to go back to the jungle and eat their bananas", for which he later apologised, and admitted to saying to a teenage opponent that "You’re [expletive] diving all over the place like a big tart. Like your Mum."

In September 2008 Auckland Grammar pulled out of the final with Mount Albert Grammar School after allegations Kevin Fallon "man-handled" a player during a brawl.

In the 2008 New Year Honours, Fallon was appointed a Member of the New Zealand Order of Merit for services to soccer.

In August 2009 he was banned for a season because of complaints he accused ref Alan Marriott of being biased.

In September 2012 a complaint was made by a parent that he made offensive comments to a rival player when coaching Mount Albert Grammar School.

In May 2013 Fallon was banned from making on-field decisions after complaints about his behaviour.

In July 2014, Fallon was dismissed from Mount Albert Grammar School for breaking the school's sporting code of conduct.

In September 2018 Fallon was announced as head coach for the Cook Islands national football team. He signed a contract for two years but did not coach any competitive games for them.
