= 1997–98 National Summer Soccer League =

National Summer Soccer League
- Season: 1997–98
- Champions: Napier City Rovers

The 1997–98 National Summer Soccer League was the third and final season of a short-lived nationwide association football club competition in New Zealand. It was replaced in 1999 by the second incarnation of the New Zealand National Soccer League. The competition was won by Napier City Rovers.

== Structure ==
The league was an invitation-only competition, with no promotion or relegation taking place. Seven of the teams which took part in 1997 also took part this season. Wellington United and Mount Maunganui did not participate in the 1997 season; their places were taken by Mount Wellington, Team Otago, and Lower Hutt City. Woolston WMC also did not participate, but were one of the teams represented by a composite side, Canterbury Woolston.

Matches took place between November 1997 and April 1998, with a three-week break from late December to mid-January. The competition was divided into two stages. In the first stage the eleven teams took part in a round-robin league, with each team playing every other team home and away. The top three teams from this stage progressed to a play-off series. This involved the second and third-placed teams from the league phase playing each other, with the winner meeting the league's top-placed team in the final.

The unusual points system used in the 1996 and 1997 competitions was abandoned in 1998, and was replaced by the standard system of three points for a win, one for a draw, and none for a loss.

== League stage ==
=== League table ===
Pos	Team	Pld	W	D	L	GF	GA	GD	Pts	Qualification
1	Napier City Rovers (C)	20	14	4	2	66	34	+32	46	Qualifield to Finals
2	Central United	20	13	2	5	61	34	+27	41	Qualifield to Finals
3	North Shore United	20	11	2	7	50	43	+7	35	Qualifield to Finals
4	Miramar Rangers	20	9	6	5	41	34	+7	33	
5	Waitakere City	20	8	6	6	48	45	+3	30	
6	Nelson Suburbs	20	7	4	9	42	46	−4	25	
7	Melville United	20	6	2	12	46	56	−10	20	
8	Mount Wellington	20	5	5	10	27	39	−12	20	
9	Team Otago (R)	20	5	4	11	43	54	−11	19	Team withdrew
10	Woolston WMC	20	4	7	9	37	55	−18	19	
11	Lower Hutt City	20	5	4	11	31	52	−21	19	

Rules for classification: 1) points; 2) goal difference; 3) number of goals scored.
(C) Champions; (R) Relegated

== Finals ==
=== Semi-final ===
Central United	4–0	North Shore United

=== Final ===
Napier City Rovers	5–2	Central United

== Records and statistics ==
Biggest winning margin

- Napier City Rovers 8, Canterbury Woolston 1
- Central United 9, North Shore United 2

Highest aggregate score

- Waitakere City 9, Napier City Rovers 5
