= 1978 New Zealand National Soccer League =

Season of New Zealand football competition

The 1978 New Zealand National Soccer League was the ninth season of a nationwide round-robin club competition in New Zealand football. A change was made from previous years, with the replacement of goal average by goal difference as a means for ranking teams equal on points.

== Promotion and relegation ==
Promotion was automatic, with the three lowest placed sides in the 1977 league (New Brighton, Dunedin City, and Caversham) replaced by the winners of the northern, central, and southern leagues (Courier Rangers, Waterside, and Woolston WMC respectively).

== Team performance ==
The 1978 league saw a return of the traditional top-of-the-table rivalry between Trans Tours Christchurch United and Mount Wellington, with the Christchurch side narrowly finishing top. The Mount led the league for long periods of the season, but this was largely due to Christchurch having played less games. The outstanding matches saw results go in the southerners' favour, and they became the first side to record a third league title. Nelson United were the Mount's bogey team again, holding on for a draw in the last game of the season to leave the Aucklanders in second place. They had previously upset the odds by beating Mount Wellington in the 1977 Chatham Cup final.

Both Blockhouse Bay and Eastern Suburbs greatly improved on their 1977 league performance to finish in the top four. In the case of Suburbs this was largely through the importation of English players Bryn Gunn and Steve Elliot from Nottingham Forest. Elliot made the most of his stint with Suburbs, scoring 17 times in just 12 matches.

Newly promoted Courier Rangers from Otahuhu in Auckland finished fifth, followed by North Shore United. Rangers played excellently at home, but had difficulty finding the net away, leaving them with a mid-table finish. Loss of squad members from the previous season weighed against Shore, who were unable to mount any substantial bid to retain their title. Nelson United finished seventh for the second year in a row, hampered by a seeming inability to score goals. Stop Out trailed them in eighth, largely a result of a dreadful away season which saw them win just one from eleven games on the road.

Just two years after being crowned champions, Wellington Diamond United only narrowly avoided the drop. A poor run of two wins in their final twelve games was a substantial indication of their peril. Hamilton returned to the regional leagues, despite having the league's top scorer, and they were joined in relegation by newly promoted Waterside and Woolston WMC. The Wharfies seemed to make a habit of losing matches where they seemed comfortably in control, losing six matches they had led and missing several penalties during the season. Woolston were outclassed throughout the season and never looked likely to avoid the drop.

== League table ==
Pos	Team	Pld	W	D	L	GF	GA	GD	Pts
1	Christchurch United (C)	22	13	6	3	45	16	+29	32
2	Mount Wellington	22	14	4	4	40	26	+14	32
3	Bay Olympic	22	10	8	4	38	28	+10	28
4	Eastern Suburbs	22	12	3	7	46	24	+22	27
5	Courier Rangers	22	9	5	8	25	19	+6	23
6	North Shore United	22	7	8	7	39	36	+3	22
7	Nelson United	22	7	8	7	23	34	−11	22
8	Stop Out	22	6	7	9	26	31	−5	19
9	Wellington United	22	6	5	11	27	45	−18	17
10	Melville United (R)	22	7	2	13	33	43	−10	16
11	Waterside Karori (R)	22	6	2	14	24	44	−20	14
12	Woolston WMC (R)	22	4	4	14	18	38	−20	12

Rules for classification: 1) points; 2) goal difference; 3) number of goals scored.
(C) Champions; (R) Relegated

== Records and statistics ==
Top scorer

- Keith Nelson (Hamilton)

== Sources ==
- Hilton, T. (1991) An association with soccer. Auckland: The New Zealand Football Association. ISBN 0-473-01291-X.
