= Carl Jorgensen (footballer) =

New Zealand footballer

Personal information
- Full name: Carl Jorgensen
- Date of birth: 11 July 1966 (age 60)
- Place of birth: New Zealand
- Position: Defender

Senior career*
Years	Team	Apps	(Gls)
1991	Waitakere City		
1991–1992	Brisbane United	5	(0)
1992–1996	Waitakere City		

International career
1991	New Zealand	1	(0)
- * Club domestic league appearances and goals

Carl Jorgensen is a former association football player who represented New Zealand at international level.

Jorgensen made a solitary official international appearance for New Zealand as a substitute in a 1–2 loss to Australia on 15 May 1991.

He played most of his career with Waitakere City in New Zealand, save for a single season with Brisbane United. He walked out on the Queensland club following criticism about his aggressive playing style from United coach Miron Bleiberg.
