= Mount Albert-Ponsonby AFC =

Mount Albert-Ponsonby
- Full name: Mount Albert-Ponsonby AFC
- Founded: 1931
- Ground: Anderson Park, Mount Albert, Auckland, New Zealand
- Chairman: Jason Conquer
- Manager: Darren White
- League: NRFL Championship
- 2026: NRFL Championship, 10th of 12
- Website: https://www.sporty.co.nz/mtalbertponsonbyafc/Home
Home colours	Away colours

Mount Albert-Ponsonby is a semi-professional association football club in Mount Albert, Auckland, New Zealand. The club competes in the NRFL Championship.

== History ==
The club is an amalgamated between Mount Albert FC and Ponsonby in 1971. Ponsonby had previously won the Chatham Cup, New Zealand's premier knockout tournament, in 1927 and 1933.

The club won play-off series to earn a place in the 1971 National Soccer League. The team were briefly known, during their second season in the league, as Auckland City FC after getting support from Eden AFC (Note: This was a different team to the current Auckland City team which has operated under that name since 2004.)

== Present day ==
Mount Albert-Ponsonby current home ground is Anderson Park, Mt Albert, Auckland. The team's current kit colours are Blue with a Gold trim for the home kit, and Red for the away kit.

== Notes ==
Chatham Cup
Preceded by Sunnyside	Winner as Ponsonby AFC; 1927 Chatham Cup	Succeeded by Petone
Preceded by Wellington Marist	Winner as Ponsonby AFC; 1933 Chatham Cup	Succeeded by Auckland Thistle
