= Dunedin City AFC =

Dunedin City
- Full name: Dunedin City Association Football Club
- Founded: 1909 as Dunedin High School Old Boys
- Dissolved: 1991
- Ground: De Carle Park, Saint Kilda, Dunedin
- League: defunct
Home colours

Chart of yearly ladder positions for Dunedin City in NZ 1st division soccer

Dunedin City is a former New Zealand football club based in the South Island city of Dunedin. Dunedin City was founded in 1909 as Dunedin High School Old Boys, and changed their name to Dunedin City in 1970. The team won the Chatham Cup in 1981, and was a member of the National League in 1977 and 1979–87, before withdrawing from the league for financial reasons. The team won promotion again in 1991 but choose not to join the National League due to the travel costs. The team survived until 1991 before being disbanded.

Chatham Cup
Preceded by Mount Wellington	Winner; 1981 Chatham Cup	Succeeded by Mount Wellington
