= Papatoetoe AFC =

Papatoetoe
- Full name: Papatoetoe Association Football Club
- Nicknames: The Reds, Toey
- Founded: 1959
- Ground: Murdoch Park, Papatoetoe
- President: Vacant
- Coach: Vacant
- League: NRF League One
- 2026: NRF League One, 7th of 8
Home colours	Away colours

Papatoetoe AFC is an association football club based in Papatoetoe, New Zealand. They currently compete in the NRF League One. However, they enjoyed successful spells having won two NRFL Premier League crowns.

== History ==
Papatoetoe AFC was founded in 1959 through the efforts of Ken Hastings. The club entered the new Franklin & Districts competitions in 1960, competing from the Papatoetoe Recreation Ground. In 1965, the club moved to its current home at Murdoch Park, and the same year its senior team entered the Northern League. It gained promotion in 1971, and it spent much of the next decade in either the lower reaches of the Premier League or the upper part of the second flight. Papatoetoe have reached the quarter-finals of the Chatham Cup on three occasions, in 1984, 1985, and 1986, but have yet to progress beyond this stage of the competition. In 2022, the Reserves team won the NRF Knockout Cup.
