= Nelson United AFC =

Nelson United
- Full name: Nelson United Association Football Club
- Nickname: The Pride
- Founded: 1968 (amalgamation of clubs which trace their origin to 1924)
- Ground: Guppy Park, Nelson
Home colours

Nelson United was a New Zealand soccer club, based in the South Island city of Nelson. Their home ground was Guppy Park.

== History ==
The team was founded in 1968 through the amalgamation of Nelson Thistle (founded 1924) and Nelson Rangers (founded 1950 as Settlers, name changed in 1959). Nelson United merged with Nelson Metro, Nelson City, and Tahunanui in 2011 to form FC Nelson.

United played in the old New Zealand National Soccer League's top flight 1976–80, 1983–88, and 1991–92. They were winners of the 1977 Chatham Cup, and were finalists in 1978. Nelson Rangers had previously reached the semi-finals in 1962 and 1964.

Chatham Cup
Preceded by Christchurch United	Winner; 1977 Chatham Cup	Succeeded by Manurewa
