= Association football in New Zealand =

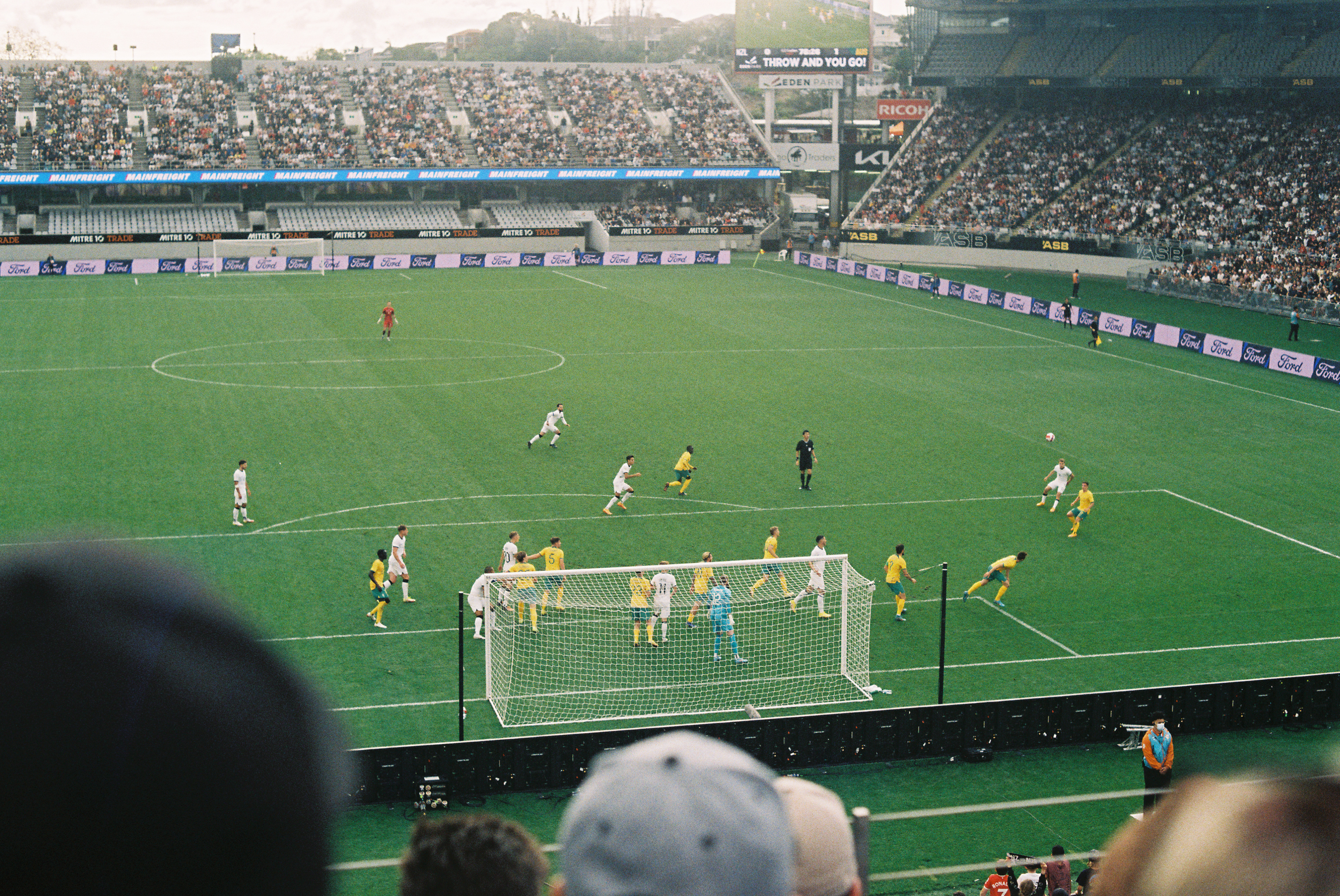
- Country: New Zealand
- Governing body: Football
- National team: New Zealand
- Nickname: All Whites
- Clubs: 500

National competitions
- New Zealand National League; National Women's League; Chatham Cup; Kate Sheppard Cup

Club competitions
- Northern League; Central League; Southern League

International competitions
- OFC Professional League; OFC Champions League

Audience records
- Single match: 43,217 – (2023); 2023 FIFA Women's World Cup – 3 matches (international); 37,034 – (2017); All Whites vs Peru (national team record); 32,792 – (2010); Wellington Phoenix FC vs Newcastle Jets (club – competitive); 31,853 – (2007); Wellington Phoenix FC vs Los Angeles Galaxy (club – exhibition)
- Season: 18,101 – (2024–25); Auckland FC (average); 247,754 – (2024–25); Auckland FC (cumulative)

Association football, also known as football or soccer, is a popular recreation sport in New Zealand. The sport is administered by the governing body New Zealand Football (NZF). It is the third-most popular men's team sport after rugby union and cricket. Approximately 60% of the people in New Zealand are considered association football fans.

Among New Zealand adults in 2000, it was the 12th most participated sport, at seven percent. Among boys ages 5–17, it was the most participated in sport, with a 17 percent participation rate; among girls, it ranks fifth in popularity at six percent, behind swimming, netball, horse riding, and tennis.

== Administration ==
Six regional federations participate in the administration and promotion of the sport in New Zealand:

- Federation One (Northern Region Football) – Northland and Auckland
- Federation Two (WaiBOP Football) – Waikato, Bay of Plenty
- Federation Three (Central Football) – Gisborne, Hawke's Bay, Taranaki, Manawatū-Whanganui
- Federation Four (Capital Football) – Greater Wellington, including the Kāpiti Coast and Wairarapa
- Federation Five (Mainland Football) – Tasman, Marlborough, Nelson, West Coast, Northern and Central Canterbury
- Federation Six (Southern Football) – South Canterbury, Otago, Southland

== History and achievements ==
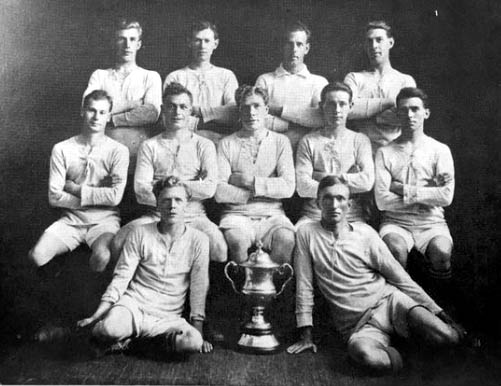
The Seacliff AFC won the first Chatham Cup in 1923

The first Chatham Cup final was played in October 1923, when Seacliff from Otago defeated Wellington YMCA 4–0. The Chatham Cup has become New Zealand football's longest-running club competition.

The women's version of the Chatham Cup was founded in 1994. Originally called the Women's Knockout Cup it was renamed in 2018 to the Kate Sheppard Cup in honour of Kate Sheppard on the 125th anniversary of the women's suffrage movement in New Zealand. Lynn-Avon United holds the record for most titles with nine.

New Zealand's senior men's side, the All Whites, has qualified twice for the FIFA World Cup. In 1982 the qualification was notable in that New Zealand played more matches (15) and traveled further (55,000 miles) than any other team to qualify. Grouped with Brazil, Scotland and the USSR, New Zealand did not win any of their matches. They also qualified for the 2010 FIFA World Cup in South Africa having far more success on the field than in 1982. The All Whites drew 1–1 with Slovakia and defending champion Italy and had a 0–0 draw with Paraguay. They were the only team to remain undefeated in the competition.

New Zealand also participated in the 2009 FIFA Confederations Cup, also in South Africa. They were placed in Group A with Iraq, South Africa, and Spain. New Zealand lost their opening match 0–5 against Spain before losing 0–2 to South Africa. However, the team earned New Zealand's first competition point at a FIFA Confederations Cup after drawing 0–0 with Iraq.

New Zealand hosted the 1999 FIFA U-17 World Championship, with matches played in Auckland, Napier, Christchurch and Dunedin. New Zealand also hosted the inaugural FIFA U-17 Women's World Cup in 2008, with matches hosted in Auckland, Hamilton, Wellington and Christchurch.

New Zealand's under-23 team, the "Oly-Whites", qualified for their first Olympic Games appearance in 2008 for the Beijing Summer Olympics. The team have then gone on to also play at the 2012 and 2020 Summer Olympics.

The New Zealand's women's team, nicknamed the Football Ferns, also qualified for their first Olympic appearance in 2008 and at each games since in 2012, 2016 and 2020. In addition to this, the Football Ferns have participated in the FIFA Women's World Cup qualifying for the first one in 1991. Then again in 2007, 2011, 2015 and 2019. They jointly hosted the 2023 FIFA Women's World Cup with Australia. New Zealand won the 1975 AFC Women's Championship, defeating Thailand 3–1 in Hong Kong.

== Professional football ==
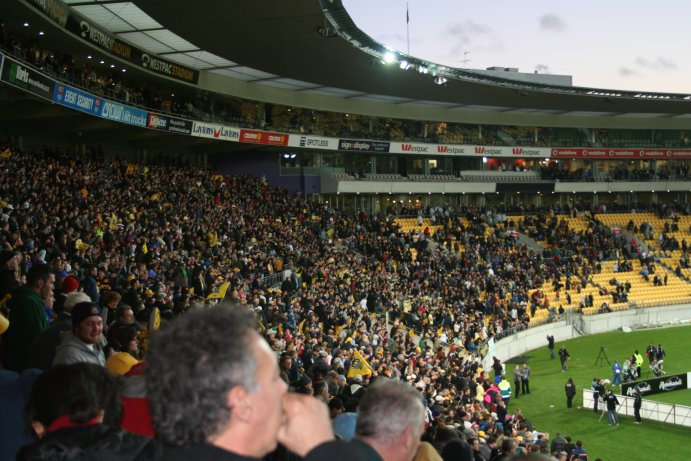
Wellington Phoenix vs Melbourne Victory game at the Westpac Trust Stadium in August 2007.

Fully professional football began in 1999 with the induction of the Auckland-based Football Kingz FC into Australia's National Soccer League (NSL). Despite having a record of poor attendances, Auckland was included in the A-League competition when the NSL was scrapped in favour of an eight-franchise A-League. The Kingz were re-branded as New Zealand Knights FC but still only managed to draw small crowds. In their final season, the average attendance for the Knights was 3,014, well below the average of the next lowest attracting team—Perth Glory averaging 7,671.

During the later stages of the 2006–07 season, Football Federation Australia (FFA) removed the New Zealand Knights's (NZK) A-League licence due to the club's financial and administrative problems and poor on-field performance. After the resignation of the NZK board, the FFA transferred the licence to New Zealand Soccer for them to administrate the rest of the club's season before its subsequent dissolution.

After these events, the FFA granted a provisional competition licence for New Zealand Soccer to sub-let to a suitable, New Zealand-based team to take the place left vacant by the defunct Knights. After much delay from both the FFA and NZS, Wellington property magnate Terry Serepisos was selected as the owner of the new franchise. The team, eventually named Wellington Phoenix FC, would be based at Wellington's Westpac Stadium and coached by Ricki Herbert. Herbert also held the responsibility of coaching the New Zealand national team. With only three months to prepare, the Phoenix faced a first season without a proper pre-season and with a much smaller talent pool to recruit from.

The first game in Phoenix history, a 2–2 draw with then-reigning champion Melbourne Victory, set a new national record for attendance at a competitive football fixture at 14,421. The cumulative attendance over the first three home matches exceeded that of the Knights entire cumulative attendance from both years of their existence. The national attendance record was later exceeded a second time, with 18,345 turning out for a 1–2 loss against Adelaide United. The Phoenix followed this match with an exhibition friendly against Los Angeles Galaxy, including their marquee player David Beckham. The attendance from this match of 31,853 set a new national record for attendance at any football match which was only broken by the game the national team played with Bahrain to qualify for the 2010 World Cup.

Wellington finished its first season last in the league on goal differential, having equal points with seventh-placed Perth Glory, and only earned one more ladder point than the Knights had the previous season. Despite this, Phoenix was declared the success story of the 2007–08 season by the FFA.

On 7 March 2010 a new attendance record for a club football fixture was set in Wellington during play-off match against Newcastle Jets. Phoenix won 3–1 in the extra time in front of 32,792 fans.

== National competitions ==
The current national senior men's competition is the New Zealand National League which is a club based competition. The competition is contested by eleven teams, with teams qualifying from their regional leagues. Four teams qualify from the Northern League, three qualify from the Central League, two qualify from the Southern League and the Auckland FC Reserves and Wellington Phoenix Reserves are automatically given a spot each year. The regional leagues runs from March through to September, with each league having a varying number of games. The Championship phase runs after the completion of the regional phase, with each team playing each other once, followed by a grand final. Each season, the grand final gains qualification to the OFC Champions League, the continental competition for the Oceania region.

The originally national senior men's football competition was the National Soccer League. The NSL was founded in 1970 and consisted of club based teams qualifying from their regional leagues. The NSL ceased to exist after the 2003 season, being replaced by the ISPS Handa Premiership, a professional/semi-professional franchise league which ran from 2004 to 2021.

The Women's National League was founded in 2004 and, unlike its male counterpart, the teams were run by the different regional federations. It has a brief hiatus in 2008 before returning in 2009 and including not only the regional federations but different team New Zealand Football Development teams run by New Zealand Football. In 2021, it went through another change, moving slowly to club based like the men's competition, starting with a Northern League where four club teams will qualify and play off with the regional federations representing Central, Capital, Mainland and Southern.

The Chatham Cup is a national knockout competition in the style of England's FA Cup. It is the oldest national competition, having been contested since 1923. It is open to all clubs – Auckland FC and Wellington Phoenix FC are not eligible to compete, although their reserve teams can participate. The competition runs alongside the winter club seasons, beginning in April and usually concluding in September.

The Kate Sheppard Cup is the women's national club based knockout competition that was first played in 1994. Originally called the Women's Knockout Cup, it changed its name to its current one in 2018.

== Regional competition ==
Premier Men's winter club competition is divided into three regional leagues:

- The Northern League, consisting of teams from Federations One (Northland/Auckland) and Two (Waikato/Bay of Plenty)
- The Central League, consisting of teams from Federations Three (Central North Island) and Four (Greater Wellington)
- The Southern League, consisting of teams from Federation Five (Upper South Island) and Federation Six (Lower South Island)

Premier Women's winter club competition is divided into three regional leagues:

- The NRFL Women's Premiership, consisting of teams from Federations One (Northland/Auckland) and Two (Waikato/Bay of Plenty)
- The Women's Central League, consisting of teams from Federations Three (Central North Island) and Four (Greater Wellington)
- The Women's South Island League, consisting of teams from Federation Five (Upper South Island) and Federation Six (Lower South Island)

== National champions ==
=== Men's ===
Championship determination
Season(s)	Format
1970 to 1992	First placed team
1993 onwards	Grand Final winning team

==== Year-by-year ====
Year	Competition	Champion (Note: Number of titles in brackets)	Runner up	Score	Venue	Crowd
1970	National Soccer League	Blockhouse Bay (1)	Eastern Suburbs	Season decided on league standings		
1971	National Soccer League	Eastern Suburbs (1)	Mount Wellington	Season decided on league standings		
1972	National Soccer League	Mount Wellington (1)	Bay Olympic	Season decided on league standings		
1973	National Soccer League	Christchurch United (1)	Mount Wellington	Season decided on league standings		
1974	National Soccer League	Mount Wellington (2)	Christchurch United	Season decided on league standings		
1975	National Soccer League	Christchurch United (2)	North Shore United	Season decided on league standings		
1976	National Soccer League	Wellington United (1)	Mount Wellington	Season decided on league standings		
1977	National Soccer League	North Shore United (1)	Stop Out	Season decided on league standings		
1978	National Soccer League	Christchurch United (3)	Mount Wellington	Season decided on league standings		
1979	National Soccer League	Mount Wellington (3)	Christchurch United	Season decided on league standings		
1980	National Soccer League	Mount Wellington (4)	Gisborne City	Season decided on league standings		
1981	National Soccer League	Wellington United (2)	Dunedin City	Season decided on league standings		
1982	National Soccer League	Mount Wellington (5)	North Shore United	Season decided on league standings		
1983	National Soccer League	Manurewa (1)	North Shore United	Season decided on league standings		
1984	National Soccer League	Gisborne City (1)	Papatoetoe	Season decided on league standings		
1985	National Soccer League	Wellington United (3)	Gisborne City	Season decided on league standings		
1986	National Soccer League	Mount Wellington (6)	Miramar Rangers	Season decided on league standings		
1987	National Soccer League	Christchurch United (4)	Gisborne City	Season decided on league standings		
1988	National Soccer League	Christchurch United (5)	Mount Wellington	Season decided on league standings		
1989	National Soccer League	Napier City Rovers (1)	Mount Maunganui	Season decided on league standings		
1990	National Soccer League	Waitakere City (1)	Mount Wellington	Season decided on league standings		
1991	National Soccer League	Christchurch United (6)	Miramar Rangers	Season decided on league standings		
1992	National Soccer League	Waitakere City (2)	Waikato United	Season decided on league standings		
1993	Superclub League	Napier City Rovers (2)	Waitakere City	4–3 (a.e.t.)	Bill McKinlay Park, Auckland	Unknown
1994	Superclub League	North Shore United (2)	Napier City Rovers	3–1	Park Island, Napier	Unknown
1995	Superclub League	Waitakere City (3)	Waikato United	4–0	Bill McKinlay Park, Auckland	Unknown
1996	National Summer Soccer League	Waitakere City (4)	Miramar Rangers	5–2	Bill McKinlay Park, Auckland	Unknown
1996–97	National Summer Soccer League	Waitakere City (5)	Napier City Rovers	3–1	Bill McKinlay Park, Auckland	Unknown
1997–98	National Summer Soccer League	Napier City Rovers (3)	Central United	5–2	Park Island, Napier	Unknown
1999	New Zealand Island Soccer Leagues	Central United (1)	Dunedin Technical	3–1	North Harbour Stadium, Auckland	3,500
2000	National Club Championship	Napier City Rovers (4)	Waikato United	0–0 (4–2 pen.)	North Harbour Stadium, Auckland	Unknown
2001	National Club Championship	Central United (2)	Miramar Rangers	3–2	North Harbour Stadium, Auckland	Unknown
2002	National Club Championship	Miramar Rangers (1)	Napier City Rovers	3–1	North Harbour Stadium, Auckland	2,500
2003	National Club Championship	Miramar Rangers (2)	East Auckland	3–2	North Harbour Stadium, Auckland	2,000
2004–05	New Zealand Football Championship	Auckland City (1)	Waitakere United	3–2	North Harbour Stadium, Auckland	Unknown
2005–06	New Zealand Football Championship	Auckland City (2)	Canterbury United	3–3 (4–3 pen.)	North Harbour Stadium, Auckland	Unknown
2006–07	New Zealand Football Championship	Auckland City (3)	Waitakere United	3–2	North Harbour Stadium, Auckland	Unknown
2007–08	New Zealand Football Championship	Waitakere United (1)	Team Wellington	2–0	Douglas Field, Auckland	2,011
2008–09	New Zealand Football Championship	Auckland City (4)	Waitakere United	2–1	Douglas Field, Auckland	2,500
2009–10	New Zealand Football Championship	Waitakere United (2)	Canterbury United	3–1	Fred Taylor Park, Auckland	Unknown
2010–11	New Zealand Football Championship	Waitakere United (3)	Auckland City	3–2	Douglas Field, Auckland	3,500
2011–12	New Zealand Football Championship	Waitakere United (4)	Team Wellington	4–1	Douglas Field, Auckland	2,500
2012–13	New Zealand Football Championship	Waitakere United (5)	Auckland City	4–3 (a.e.t.)	Douglas Field, Auckland	1,600
2013–14	New Zealand Football Championship	Auckland City (5)	Team Wellington	1–0	Kiwitea Street, Auckland	2,232
2014–15	New Zealand Football Championship	Auckland City (6)	Hawke's Bay United FC	2–1	Kiwitea Street, Auckland	1,853
2015–16	New Zealand Football Championship	Team Wellington (1)	Auckland City	4–2 (a.e.t.)	QBE Stadium, Auckland	1,508
2016–17	New Zealand Football Championship	Team Wellington (2)	Auckland City	2–1	QBE Stadium, Auckland	Unknown
2017–18	New Zealand Football Championship	Auckland City (7)	Team Wellington	1–0	QBE Stadium, Auckland	2,196
2018–19	New Zealand Football Championship	Eastern Suburbs (2)	Team Wellington	3–0	North Harbour Stadium, Auckland	Unknown
2019–20	New Zealand Football Championship	Auckland City (8)	Team Wellington	Season cut short due to COVID-19 pandemic		
2020–21	New Zealand Football Championship	Team Wellington (3)	Auckland City	4–2	North Harbour Stadium, Auckland	Unknown
2021	New Zealand National League: South Central Series	National League season cancelled due to COVID-19 pandemic in Northern regions; South Central Series won by Miramar Rangers	Wellington Olympic	7–2	Jerry Collins Stadium, Wellington	Unknown
2022	New Zealand National League	Auckland City (9)	Wellington Olympic	3–2	Mt Smart Stadium, Auckland	Unknown
2023	New Zealand National League	Wellington Olympic	Auckland City	2–0	Mt Smart Stadium, Auckland	Unknown
2024	New Zealand National League	Auckland City (10)	Birkenhead United	2–1 (a.e.t.)	North Harbour Stadium, Auckland	4,972
2025	New Zealand National League	Auckland City (11)	Wellington Olympic	2–2 (a.e.t.); 7–6 (p)	Newtown Park, Wellington	Unknown

==== Total championships won ====
Teams in bold compete in the New Zealand National League as of the 2026 season.

Club	Winners	Winning seasons
**Auckland City**	11	2004–05, 2005–06, 2006–07, 2008–09, 2013–14, 2014–15, 2017–18, 2019–20, 2022, 2024, 2025
Uni-Mount Bohemian	6	1972, 1974, 1979, 1980, 1982, 1986
Christchurch United	6	1973, 1975, 1978, 1987, 1988, 1991
Waitakere City (Note: Disbanded clubs.)	5	1990, 1992, 1995, 1996, 1996–97
Waitakere United	5	2007–08, 2009–10, 2010–11, 2011–12, 2012–13
**Napier City Rovers**	4	1989, 1993, 1997–98, 2000
Wellington United	3	1976, 1981, 1985
Team Wellington	3	2015–16, 2016–17, 2020–21
North Shore United	2	1977, 1994
Central United	2	1999, 2001
**Miramar Rangers**	2	2002, 2003
**Eastern Suburbs**	2	1971, 2018–19
Bay Olympic (Note: 1970 tournament won by Blockhouse Bay, which underwent a merger in 1998 to form Bay Olympic, where it received the title as successor to the previous club.)	1	1970
Manurewa	1	1983
Gisborne City	1	1984
**Wellington Olympic**	1	2023

==== Total premierships won ====
Teams in bold compete in the New Zealand National League as of the 2026 season. From 1993 to 2003, and from 2021 onwards no official title was awarded.

Club	Winners	Winning seasons
**Auckland City**	13	2004–05, 2005–06, 2009–10, 2011–12, 2013–14, 2014–15, 2015–16, 2016–17, 2017–18, 2018–19, 2019–20, 2020–21, 2022
Waitakere United (Note: Disbanded clubs.)	5	2006–07, 2007–08, 2008–09, 2010–11, 2012–13
Waitakere City	3	1993, 1994, 1995
**Napier City Rovers**	3	1996–97, 1997–98, 2002
**Miramar Rangers**	3	1996, 2001, 2003
**Wellington Olympic**	2	2023, 2025
Central United	1	1999 North
Dunedin Technical (Note: Disbanded clubs that have undergone merger.)	1	1999 South
Uni-Mount Bohemian	1	2000
**Birkenhead United**	1	2024

==== Most successful clubs overall ====
Club	Domestic Titles							Continental Titles				Overall titles
Club	Championship	Premiership	Australian Premiership	Chatham Cup	White Ribbon Cup	Charity Cup	Total	OFC Men's Champions League	OFC Professional League	OFC President's Cup	Total	Overall titles
Auckland City	**11**	**12**	-	1	-	**7**	**31**	**13**	-	**1**	**14**	**45**
Uni-Mount Bohemian	6	-	-	**7**	-	3	16	-	-	-	-	16
Waitakere United	5	5	-	-	-	1	11	2	-	-	2	13
Christchurch United	6	-	-	**7**	-	-	13	-	-	-	-	13
Napier City Rovers	4	-	-	5	-	-	9	-	-	-	-	9
North Shore United	2	-	-	6	-	1	9	-	-	-	-	9
Waitakere City	5	-	-	3	-	-	8	-	-	-	-	8
Eastern Suburbs	2	-	-	6	-	-	8	-	-	-	-	8
Team Wellington	3	-	-	-	**1**	2	6	1	-	-	1	7
Central United	2	-	-	5	-	-	7	-	-	-	-	7
Manurewa	1	-	-	4	-	2	7	-	-	-	-	7
Miramar Rangers	2	-	-	4	-	-	6	-	-	-	-	6
Wellington United	3	-	-	-	-	2	5	-	-	-	-	5
Wellington Olympic	1	-	-	3	-	1	5	-	-	-	-	5
Cashmere Technical	-	-	-	4	-	-	4	-	-	-	-	4
Waterside Karori	-	-	-	4	-	-	4	-	-	-	-	4
Western	-	-	-	4	-	-	4	-	-	-	-	4
Petone	-	-	-	3	-	-	3	-	-	-	-	3
Western Suburbs	-	-	-	3	-	-	3	-	-	-	-	3
Bay Olympic	1	-	-	1	-	-	2	-	-	-	-	2
Gisborne City	1	-	-	-	-	1	2	-	-	-	-	2
Birkenhead United	-	-	-	2	-	-	2	-	-	-	-	2
Mount Albert-Ponsonby	-	-	-	2	-	-	2	-	-	-	-	2
Northern	-	-	-	2	-	-	2	-	-	-	-	2
Seatoun	-	-	-	2	-	-	2	-	-	-	-	2
Three Kings United	-	-	-	2	-	-	2	-	-	-	-	2
Wellington Marist	-	-	-	2	-	-	2	-	-	-	-	2
Auckland	-	-	1	-	-	-	1	-	-	-	-	1
Auckland Harbour Board	-	-	-	1	-	-	1	-	-	-	-	1
Auckland Thistle	-	-	-	1	-	-	1	-	-	-	-	1
Dunedin City	-	-	-	1	-	-	1	-	-	-	-	1
Dunedin Technical	-	-	-	1	-	-	1	-	-	-	-	1
East Coast Bays	-	-	-	1	-	-	1	-	-	-	-	1
Melville United	-	-	-	1	-	-	1	-	-	-	-	1
Nelson United	-	-	-	1	-	-	1	-	-	-	-	1
Onehunga Mangere United	-	-	-	1	-	-	1	-	-	-	-	1
Onehunga Sports	-	-	-	1	-	-	1	-	-	-	-	1
Seacliff	-	-	-	1	-	-	1	-	-	-	-	1
Stop Out	-	-	-	1	-	-	1	-	-	-	-	1
Sunnyside Hospital	-	-	-	1	-	-	1	-	-	-	-	1
Waikato United	-	-	-	1	-	-	1	-	-	-	-	1
Wairarapa United	-	-	-	1	-	-	1	-	-	-	-	1
Wellington YMCA	-	-	-	1	-	-	1	-	-	-	-	1

=== Women's ===
==== Year-by-year ====
Year	Competition	Champion	Runner up	Score	Venue
2002	National Women's League	Auckland (1)	Mainland Soccer	Season decided on league standings	
2003	National Women's League	Auckland (2)	Capital Soccer	Season decided on league standings	
2004	National Women's League	Capital Soccer (1)	Auckland*	2–1	Unknown
2005	National Women's League	Auckland (3)	Capital Soccer*	4–2	Newtown Park, Wellington
2006	National Women's League	Auckland* (4)	Capital Soccer	3–1	Mount Smart Stadium, Auckland
2007	National Women's League	Auckland* (5)	Capital Football (Note: Changed name from Capital Soccer to Capital Football)	3–1	Newtown Park, Wellington
2008	No competition				
2009	National Women's League	Auckland* (6)	Capital Football	5–1	Bayer Growers Stadium, Pukekohe
2010–11	National Women's League	Capital Football* (2)	Waikato-Bay of Plenty	2–1	Memorial Park, Lower Hutt
2011–12	National Women's League	Northern Football* (1)	Waikato-Bay of Plenty	3–0	Parrs Park, Auckland
2012–13	National Women's League	Northern Football* (2)	Auckland Football (Note: Had changed their name the season before with the introduction of Northern Football)	2–0	Fred Taylor Park, Auckland
2013	National Women's League	Mainland Pride (1) (Note: Changed name from Mainland Soccer to Mainland Pride)	Northern Football*	4–2	North Harbour Stadium, North Shore
2014	National Women's League	Mainland Pride* (2)	New Zealand U-18 Development	3–1	ASB Football Park, Christchurch
2015	National Women's League	Northern Football (3)	Mainland Pride*	4–3	ASB Football Park, Christchurch
2016	National Women's League	Canterbury United Pride* (3) (Note: Changed name from Mainland Pride to Canterbury United Pride)	Capital Football	2–0	English Park, Christchurch
2017	National Women's League	Auckland Football (7)	Canterbury United Pride*	3–2	English Park, Christchurch
2018	National Women's League	Canterbury United Pride* (4)	Northern Lights (Note: Changed name from Northern Football to Northern Lights)	3–2	English Park, Christchurch
2019	National Women's League	Canterbury United Pride* (5)	Northern Lights	1–1 (4–3 pen.)	English Park, Christchurch
2020	National Women's League	Canterbury United Pride* (6)	Capital Football	4–0	English Park, Christchurch
2021	National Women's League: South Central Series	National League season cancelled due to COVID-19 pandemic in Northern regions; South Central Series won by Southern United	Capital Football	Season decided on league standings	
2022	National Women's League	Eastern Suburbs	Western Springs	4–0	Mount Smart Stadium, Auckland
2023	National Women's League	Auckland United	Southern United	2–0	Mount Smart Stadium, Auckland
2024	National Women's League	Auckland United (2)	CF Waterside Karori	3–1	North Harbour Stadium, North Shore
2025	National Women's League	Auckland United (3)	Eastern Suburbs	1–0	Keith Hay Park, Auckland

*Home team for final

==== Total championships won ====
Teams in bold compete in the New Zealand Women's National League as of the 2025 season.

Club	Winners	Winning seasons
Auckland Football (Note: Disbanded clubs.)	7	2002, 2003, 2005, 2006, 2007, 2009, 2017
**Canterbury United Pride**	6	2013, 2014, 2016, 2018, 2019, 2020
Northern Football	3	2011–12, 2012–13, 2015
**Auckland United**	3	2023, 2024, 2025
Capital Football	2	2004, 2010–11
**Eastern Suburbs**	1	2022

==== Total premierships won ====
Teams in bold compete in the New Zealand Women's National League as of the 2024 season. From 2021 onwards no official title was awarded.

Club	Winners	Winning seasons
**Canterbury United Pride**	8	2012 South, 2013 South, 2014, 2015, 2016, 2017, 2019, 2020
Auckland Football (Note: Disbanded clubs.)	6	2002, 2003, 2004, 2006, 2007, 2009 North
Northern Football	4	2012 North, 2013 North, 2013, 2018
Capital Football	3	2005, 2009 South, 2010 South
**Auckland United**	3	2023, 2024, 2025
WaiBOP Football	1	2010 North
**Eastern Suburbs**	1	2022

== Association football stadiums ==
Stadium	Capacity	City	Tenants	Image
Eden Park	50,000	Auckland		
Sky Stadium	36,000	Wellington	Wellington Phoenix	
Forsyth Barr Stadium	30,748	Dunedin		
Mount Smart Stadium	25,000	Auckland	Auckland FC	
North Harbour Stadium	25,000	Auckland	New Zealand national football team	

== Attendances ==
The A-League clubs from New Zealand with their average home attendance in 2024–25:

#	Club	Average
1	Auckland FC	18,101
2	Wellington Phoenix	8,366
