= 2017 National Women's League (New Zealand) =

National Women's League
- Season: 2017
- Champions: Auckland
- Matches: 23
- Goals: 100 (4.35 per match)
- Top goalscorer: Dayna Stevens and Jacqui Hand (5 goals)
- Biggest home win: Northern 5–1 Central (15 October 2017); Auckland 5–1 WaiBOP (11 November 2017); Northern 5–1 Capital (19 November 2017); Capital 6–2 Southern (26 November 2017)
- Biggest away win: WaiBOP 1–4 Capital (5 November 2017)
- Highest scoring: WaiBOP 3–5 Northern (22 October 2017); Capital 6–2 Southern (26 November 2017)
- All statistics correct as of 10 December 2017.

The 2017 National Women's League was the fifteenth season of the NWL since its establishment in 2002. Seven teams were again involved in this season representing the different regions in New Zealand. The final was played between Canterbury United Pride and Auckland, it finished 1–1 at full time before Auckland won it in extra time 3–2. It was Aucklands sixth title and first since 2009. Eleanor Isaac from Southern United was voted the 2017 National Women's League MVP for the season.

== 2017 National Women's League ==
=== Teams ===
Locations of the 2017 National Women's League Teams

Team	Location	Ground	Coach
Northern	Auckland	QBE Stadium, Domain 3	Hayley Stirling
Auckland	Auckland	Keith Hay Park	Gemma Lewis
WaiBOP	Cambridge	John Kerkhof Park	Barry Gardiner
Central Football	Palmerston North	Memorial Park	Simon Lees
Capital	Wellington	Memorial Park	Emma Evans
Canterbury United Pride	Christchurch	English Park	Mike De Bono
Southern United	Dunedin	Tahuna Park	Terry Parle

=== Table ===
Pos	Team	Pld	W	D	L	GF	GA	GD	Pts	Qualification
1	Canterbury United Pride	6	4	1	1	14	8	+6	13	Qualification to the Finals series
2	Auckland (C)	6	4	0	2	16	10	+6	12	Qualification to the Finals series
3	Southern United	6	3	1	2	10	13	−3	10	Qualification to the Finals series
4	Northern Lights	6	3	1	2	20	12	+8	10	
5	Capital	6	3	0	3	14	13	+1	9	
6	WaiBOP	6	1	1	4	9	18	−9	4	
7	Central Football	6	1	0	5	8	17	−9	3	

Source: The Ultimate New Zealand Soccer Website
Rules for classification: 1) head to head; 2) points; 2) goal difference; 3) number of goals scored.
(C) Champions

=== Matches ===
New Zealand women's football league matches took take place over October and November 2017

==== Round 1 ====
14 October 2017	Canterbury United Pride	4–1	WaiBOP	English Park, Christchurch
12:00	Moore 32'; Phillips 45', 60'; Longo 90+4'	Report	Krystman 39'

15 October 2017	Northern	5–1	Central	QBE Stadium, Domain 3, Auckland
13:00	Barnett 11', 28'; Stevens 24'; Tawharu 81', 89'	Report	Boone 71'

15 October 2017	Southern United	3–2	Auckland	Forsyth Barr Stadium, Dunedin
14:00	Smith 32' (pen.); Isaac 60'; Bacon 84'	Report	Skilton 49'; Hand 69'

Bye: Capital Football

==== Round 2 ====
22 October 2017	Central	3–1	Southern United	Memorial Park, Palmerston North
12:00	Boone (3)	Report	Isaac	Referee: Debbie Stevens

22 October 2017	WaiBOP	3–5	Northern	John Kerkhof Park, Cambridge
13:00	Ryan 5'; Maguire 11', 82'	Report	Loye 44', 53'; Stevens 45+1', 68'; Lonergan 55'	Referee: Beth Rattray

22 October 2017	Auckland	2–1	Capital	Keith Hay Park, Auckland
13:00	Hand 19'; Cunningham-Lee 53'	Report	13' (o.g.)	Referee: Wendy McNeely

Bye: Canterbury United Pride

==== Round 3 ====
28 October 2017	Capital	1–0	Central	Memorial Park, Lower Hutt
13:00	Jenkins 55'	Report		Referee: Morgan Archer

28 October 2017	Southern United	0–0	WaiBOP	Tahuna Park, Dunedin
15:00		Report		Referee: Beth Rattray

29 October 2017	Northern	2–2	Canterbury United Pride	QBE Stadium, Domain 3, Auckland
13:00	Steinmetz 18'; Lonergan 41'	Report	Longo 58'; Rennie 61'	Referee: Wendy McNeely

Bye: Auckland

==== Round 4 ====
5 November 2017	Central	2–4	Auckland	Memorial Park, Palmerston North
13:00	Heywood 76', 91'	Report	O'Brien 16'; Skilton 32'; Cunningham-Lee 56'; Martin 76'	Referee: Beth Rattray

5 November 2017	Canterbury United Pride	1–2	Southern United	English Park, Christchurch
13:00	Fraser 65'	Report	Wall 7', 18'	Referee: Debbie Stevens

5 November 2017	WaiBOP	1–4	Capital	John Kerkhof Park, Cambridge
13:30	Ryan 26'	Report	Jenkins 8', 90+4'; Hahn 34'; Gregorius 35'	Referee: Anna-Marie Keighley

Bye: Northern

==== Round 5 ====
11 November 2017	Auckland	5–1	WaiBOP	Keith Hay Park, Auckland
13:00	Hand 5'; Skilton 12'; O'Brien 16', 90+5'; Mettam 23'	Report	Brown 45+2' (pen.)	Referee: Morgan Archer

11 November 2017	Capital	1–3	Canterbury United Pride	Memorial Park, Lower Hutt
12:00	Bryant 65'	Report	Phillips 20'; Cameron 45'; Moore 48' (pen.)	Referee: Debbie Stevens

12 November 2017	Southern United	2–1	Northern	Tahuna Park, Dunedin
13:00	Bacon 13', 41'	Report	Stevens 31'	Referee: Mark Dungey

Bye: Central

==== Round 6 ====
18 November 2017	Canterbury United Pride	1–0	Auckland	English Park, Christchurch
13:00	Nicholson 89'	Report		Referee: Nadia Browning

19 November 2017	WaiBop	3–0	Central	John Kerkhof Park, Cambridge
13:00	Maguire 45+1', 62'; Golding 80'	Report		Referee: Debbie Stevens

19 November 2017	Northern	5–1	Capital	QBE Stadium, Domain 3, Auckland
13:00	Loye 7'; Maynard 28'; Barnett 60'; Stevens 90+3'; Lonergan 90+16'	Report	Boobyer 52'	Referee: Wendy McNeely

Bye: Southern United

==== Round 7 ====
26 November 2017	Central	2–3	Canterbury United Pride	Memorial Park, Palmerston North
13:00	Morton; Heywood	Report	Taylor (2); Lake	Referee: Morgan Archer

26 November 2017	Auckland	3–2	Northern	Keith Hay Park, Auckland
13:00	O'Brien 22'; Robertson 40'; Hand 82'	Report	Maynard 68'; Savage 80'	Referee: Anna-Marie Keighley

26 November 2017	Capital	6–2	Southern United	Memorial Park, Lower Hutt
13:00	Main 18'; Hahn 22'; Robertson 35'; Boobyer 45+1', 65'; Jefferies 74'	Report	Hunt 2', 47'	Referee: Robert Fleetham

Bye: WaiBOP

=== Finals series ===
For the final series, the team that finishes second played off at home against the team that finishes third, while the team that finishes first has the week off before playing the winner of 2nd v 3rd. Southern qualified for the final series over Northern even though they ended up on equal points and Northern had the better goal difference due to head-to-head record, with Southern beating Northern 2–1 in the regular season. This meant they would face Auckland in Auckland, while Canterbury United Pride had the week off.

Preliminary Final

3 December 2017	Auckland	3–1	Southern United	Keith Hay Park, Auckland
13:30	Jale 26'; Blake 33'; Hand 78'	Report	Bacon 49'

Final

10 December 2017	Canterbury United Pride	2–3	Auckland	English Park, Christchurch
13:30	Longo 45'; Hepburn 105'	Report	Jale 49'; Blake 115'; Cunningham-Lee 119'	Attendance: 763 Attendance; Referee: Nadia Browning

== Statistics ==
As of 10 December 2017

=== Top scorers ===
Rank	Player	Club	Goals
1	Jacqui Hand	Auckland	5
1	Dayna Stevens	Northern	5
3	Renee Bacon	Southern	4
3	Misha Boone	Central Football	4
3	Kim Maguire	WaiBOP	4
3	Tayla O'Brien	Auckland	4
7	Jane Barnett	Northern	3
7	Libby Boobyer	Capital	3
7	Britney Cunningham-Lee	Auckland	3
7	Aleesha Heywood	Central Football	3
7	Maggie Jenkins	Capital	3
7	Cara Lonergan	Northern	3
7	Annalie Longo	Canterbury United Pride	3
7	Kate Loye	Northern	3
7	Aimee Phillips	Canterbury United Pride	3
7	Stephanie Skilton	Auckland	3

=== Own goals ===
Club	Against	Round
Auckland	Capital	2
