= 2016 National Women's League (New Zealand) =

National Women's League
- Season: 2016
- Champions: Canterbury United Pride
- Premiers: Canterbury United Pride
- Matches: 21
- Goals: 107 (5.1 per match)
- Top goalscorer: Katie Rood (7 goals)
- Biggest home win: Capital 5–1 Southern United (6 November 2016); Auckland 5–1 Central (13 November 2016)
- Biggest away win: Southern United 0–8 Northern (29 October 2016)
- Highest scoring: Southern United 0–8 Northern (29 October 2016); Southern United 2–6 WaiBOP (12 November 2016)
- Longest winning run: Northern (4 games)
- Longest unbeaten run: Capital; Northern; WaiBOP (4 games)
- Longest winless run: Southern United (6 games)
- Longest losing run: Southern United (6 games)

The 2016 National Women's League was the fourteenth season of the NWL since its establishment in 2002. Seven teams were involved this season, after being in the competition the last few seasons as preparation for the FIFA U-17 Women's World Cup, the NZ Development Squad wasn't included in the league anymore.

== 2016 National Women's League ==
=== Teams ===
Unlike its male counterpart, the ISPS Handa Premiership, the teams are run by the regional federations rather than as collaborative entities between local clubs.

Locations of the 2016 National Women's League Teams

Team	Location	Ground
Northern	Auckland	QBE Stadium 3
Auckland	Auckland	William Green Domain
WaiBOP	Cambridge	John Kerkhof Park
Central Football	Palmerston North	Memorial Park
Capital Football	Wellington	Memorial Park
Canterbury United Pride	Christchurch	English Park
Southern United	Dunedin	Tahuna Park

=== Table ===
Pos	Team	Pld	W	D	L	GF	GA	GD	Pts	Qualification
1	Canterbury United Pride (C)	6	4	1	1	20	9	+11	13	Qualification to the Finals series
2	Capital	6	4	1	1	16	8	+8	13	Qualification to the Finals series
3	WaiBOP	6	4	1	1	20	15	+5	13	Qualification to the Finals series
4	Northern Lights	6	4	0	2	21	9	+12	12	
5	Auckland	6	2	0	4	16	19	−3	6	
6	Central Football	6	1	1	4	5	17	−12	4	
7	Southern United	6	0	0	6	9	30	−21	0	

Source: The Ultimate New Zealand Soccer Website
Rules for classification: 1) points; 2) goal difference; 3) number of goals scored.
(C) Champions

=== Matches ===
Matches for the 2016 season took place between October and November 2016

Round 1

16 October 2016	Central	0–3	Auckland	Memorial Park, Palmerston North
13:00		Source	Loye 26'; Milne 74'; Rood 78' (pen.)

16 October 2016	WaiBOP	2–2	Capital	John Kerkhof Park, Cambridge
13:00	Gubb 24'; Murrihy 41' (pen.)	Source	Morison 22'; Barrott 70'

16 October 2016	Auckland	1–4	Canterbury United Pride	William Green Domain, Auckland
13:00	2' (o.g.)	Source	Bray 33', 53', 81'; Pascoe 57'

Bye: Southern United

Round 2

21 October 2016	Northern	4–3	Auckland	QBE Stadium 3, Auckland
19:30	Barnett 14'; Rood 17', 33'; Tawharu 66'	Source	Hand 26'; Leong 78'; Byrne 90+3'

23 October 2016	Canterbury United Pride	5–2	Southern United	English Park, Christchurch
11:00	Nicholson 9'; Bray 23', 56'; Hepburn 66'; Longo 77'	Source	Bacon 3', 90+3'	Referee: Debbie Stevens

23 October 2016	Capital	3–0	Southern United	Memorial Park, Lower Hutt
13:00	Main 28'; Jenkins 30'; Robertson 38'	Source		Referee: Nadia Browning

Bye: WaiBOP

Round 3

29 October 2016	Southern United	0–8	Northern	Tahuna Park, Dunedin
12:30		Source	Bott 7'; Berger 26'; Barnett 41', 58'; Tawharu 45', 76', 80'; Rood 52'	Referee: Nadia Browning

30 October 2016	Auckland	1–3	Capital	William Green Domain, Auckland
12:30	Kraakman 84'	Source	Palmer 25'; Jenkins 45'; Robertson 74'	Referee: Anna-Marie Keighley

30 October 2016	Central	1–4	WaiBOP	Memorial Park, Palmerston North
12:00	Robert 59'	Source	Maguire 5', 56'; Krystman 40'; Gubb 88'	Referee: Debbie Stevens

Bye: Canterbury United Pride

Round 4

6 November 2016	Northern	3–1	Canterbury United Pride	QBE Stadium 3, Auckland
13:00	Rood 53', 76'; Barnett 55'	Source	Longo 52'	Referee: Karyn Meade

6 November 2016	WaiBOP	4–2	Auckland	John Kerkhof Park, Cambridge
13:00	Krystman 9'; Arjomandi 18', 22', 83'	Source	Milynn 41'; Dewell 69'	Referee: Matt Trent

6 November 2016	Capital	4–2	Southern United	Memorial Park, Lower Hutt
14:00	Palmer 19', 61'; Jenkins 43', 50'; Hunter 46'	Source	Lee 27'	Referee: Debbie Stevens

Bye: Central

Round 5

12 November 2016	Southern United	2–6	WaiBOP	Peter Johnstone Park, Mosgiel
13:00	Wall 37'; Gilchrist 45'	Source	Ryan 12'; Murrihy 27' (pen.); Foster 39', 64'; Arjomandi 62' (pen.); Rhein 89'	Referee: Karyn Meade

13 November 2016	Canterbury United Pride	2–6	Capital	English Park, Christchurch
11:00	Longo 8', 45'; Roberts 87'	Source	Jenkins 86'	Referee: Anna-Marie Keighley

13 November 2016	Auckland	5–1	Central	Riverhills Park, Auckland
14:00	Bloomfield 9'; Mettam 41'; Leong 58', 87'; Byrne 83'	Source	Robert 56' (pen.)	Referee: Nadia Browning

Bye: Northern

Round 6

20 November 2016	Central	2–1	Southern United	Memorial Park, Palmerston North
12:00	James; Lyne-Lewis	Source	Gray	Referee: Wendy McNeely

20 November 2016	WaiBop	1–6	Canterbury United Pride	John Kerkhof Park, Cambridge
13:00	Gubb 49'	Source	Fraser 16'; Phillips 20', 50'; Pascoe 54', 56'; Lake 82'	Referee: Sarah Jones

20 November 2016	Capital	2–1	Canterbury United Pride	Memorial Park, Lower Hutt
13:30	Hunter 57'; Morison 70'	Source	Barnett 58'	Referee: Karyn Meade

Bye: Auckland

Round 7

26 November 2016	Southern United	3–4	Auckland	Tahuna Park, Dunedin
13:00	Bacon 33', 61'; Guildford 40'	Source	Cunningham-Lee 5'; Richards 22'; Leong 28'; Byrne 86'	Referee: Sarah Jones

27 November 2016	Canterbury United Pride	1–1	Central	English Park, Christchurch
11:00	Phillips 25'	Source	Lyne-Lewis 36'	Referee: Karyn Meade

27 November 2016	Northern	2–3	WaiBOP	QBE Stadium 3, Auckland
13:00	Rood 6'; Tawharu 18'	Source	Ryan 53', 87'; Rhein 90+1'	Referee: Debbie Stevens

Bye: Capital

=== Finals series ===
For the final series, the team that finishes second will play off at home against the team that finishes third, while the team that finishes first has the week off before playing the winner of 2nd v 3rd.

Preliminary Final

4 December 2016	Capital	2–2 (a.e.t.) (4–2 p)	WaiBOP	Memorial Park, Lower Hutt
13:00	Palmer 16'; Wittman-Wengel (red card) 56'; Morison 95'	Source	Arjomandi 10'; Elliott 67'	Referee: Debbie Stevens

Final

11 December 2016	Canterbury United Pride	2–0	Capital	English Park, Christchurch
16:00	Pascoe 44', 52'	Source		Referee: Nadia Browning

=== Top goalscorers ===
Po.	Name	Club	Goals
1	Katie Rood	Northern	7
2=	Helen Arjomandi	WaiBOP	5
2=	Jane Barnett	Northern	5
2=	Maggie Jenkins	Capital	5
2=	Holly Pascoe	Canterbury United Pride	5
2=	Sammi Tawharu	Northern	5
7=	Renee Bacon	Southern	4
7=	Lily Bray	Canterbury United Pride	4
7=	Tessa Leong	Auckland	4
7=	Annalie Longo	Canterbury United Pride	4
7=	Briar Palmer	Capital	4
