= 2020–21 in New Zealand association football =

130th competitive association football season in New Zealand

Football in New Zealand
- Season: 2020–21

Men's football
- NZFC Premiership: Auckland City
- NZFC Championship: Team Wellington
- NRFL Premier League: Cancelled
- Central Premier League: Miramar Rangers
- Mainland Premier League: Cashmere Technical
- FootballSouth Premier League: Green Island
- Chatham Cup: Cancelled
- Charity Cup: Auckland City

Women's football
- Women's Premiership: Canterbury United Pride
- Kate Sheppard Cup: Cancelled

The 2020–21 season was the 130th to the 131st competitive association football season in New Zealand.

== FIFA competitions ==
=== 2020 FIFA Club World Cup ===
1 February 2021 First round	Al-Duhail (Qatar)	3–0; Awarded (Note: The Al-Duhail v Auckland City match was awarded as a 3–0 win to Al-Duhail after Auckland City withdrew due to the COVID-19 pandemic and related quarantine measures required by the New Zealand authorities.)	(New Zealand) Auckland City	Ahmad bin Ali Stadium, Al Rayyan
20:30		Report

== Men's football ==
=== NZFC ===
Pos	Team	Pld	W	D	L	GF	GA	GD	Pts	Qualification
1	Auckland City	14	8	4	2	27	13	+14	28	Qualification to Champions League group stage and Finals series
2	Team Wellington (C)	14	7	5	2	35	21	+14	26	Qualification to Finals series Disbanded at end of season
3	Hamilton Wanderers	14	5	5	4	23	21	+2	20	Qualification to Finals series
4	Eastern Suburbs	14	5	4	5	25	23	+2	19	Qualification to Finals series
5	Waitakere United	14	4	6	4	28	26	+2	18	Disbanded at end of season
6	Canterbury United	14	5	3	6	21	24	−3	18	Disbanded at end of season
7	Hawke's Bay United	14	4	1	9	17	29	−12	13	Disbanded at end of season
8	Wellington Phoenix Reserves	14	2	4	8	18	37	−19	10	

Source: NZ Football
(C) Champions

==== Grand final ====
21 March 2021
16:10

Auckland City	2–4	Team Wellington
Tade 34' (pen.); Manickum 42'	Report	Bevin 15', 69'; Sinclair 31'; Whyte 55'

North Harbour Stadium, Auckland
Attendance: 1,587
Referee: Matt Conger (New Zealand)

=== 2020 NRFL Premier League ===
The season was declared void after 8 rounds due to the COVID-19 pandemic in New Zealand.

Pos	Team	Pld	W	D	L	GF	GA	GD	Pts	Qualification
1	Auckland United	8	6	2	0	16	7	+9	20	
2	Central United (R)	8	5	2	1	17	10	+7	17	Moved to NRF Championship
3	Eastern Suburbs	8	4	0	4	16	14	+2	12	
4	Bay Olympic	8	3	3	2	14	15	−1	12	
5	Manukau United	8	3	3	2	13	15	−2	12	
6	Western Springs	8	3	2	3	16	8	+8	11	
7	Birkenhead United	8	3	2	3	12	10	+2	11	
8	Forrest Hill Milford United	8	3	2	3	14	13	+1	11	
9	North Shore United	8	3	1	4	9	14	−5	10	
10	Hamilton Wanderers	8	3	0	5	15	19	−4	9	
11	Melville United	8	1	2	5	10	14	−4	5	
12	Waitakere City	8	1	1	6	5	18	−13	4	

Updated to match(es) played on 8 August 2020. Source:
Rules for classification: 1) Points; 2) Goal difference; 3) Goals scored; 4) Goals against; 5) Head to head; 6) Disciplinary record; 7) Coin toss
(R) Relegated

=== 2020 Central Premier League ===
Pos	Team	Pld	W	D	L	GF	GA	GD	Pts	Qualification
1	Miramar Rangers (C)	18	15	1	2	60	17	+43	46	
2	Western Suburbs	18	14	1	3	33	11	+22	43	
3	Wellington Olympic	18	12	0	6	56	24	+32	36	
4	North Wellington	18	9	0	9	47	31	+16	27	
5	Lower Hutt City	18	6	4	8	39	35	+4	22	
6	Napier City Rovers	18	6	4	8	38	36	+2	22	
7	Waterside Karori	18	5	2	11	27	59	−32	17	
8	Wairarapa United	18	4	4	10	27	55	−28	16	
9	Petone	18	4	4	10	22	50	−28	16	
10	Stop Out (R)	18	4	2	12	23	54	−31	14	Relegation to Capital Premier or Central Federation League

Source: Capital Football
Rules for classification: 1) Points; 2) Goal difference; 3) Goals scored; 4) Goals against; 5) Head to head; 6) Disciplinary record; 7) Coin toss
(C) Champions; (R) Relegated

=== 2020 Mainland Premier League ===
Pos	Team	Pld	W	D	L	GF	GA	GD	Pts	Qualification
1	Cashmere Technical (C)	21	19	2	0	82	13	+69	59	
2	Ferrymead Bays	21	10	7	4	35	21	+14	37	
3	Nomads United	21	11	4	6	50	37	+13	37	
4	Coastal Spirit	21	10	6	5	48	26	+22	36	
5	Nelson Suburbs	21	9	4	8	52	34	+18	31	
6	Christchurch United	21	6	6	9	31	37	−6	24	
7	Selwyn United	21	2	2	17	19	66	−47	8	
8	Western (R)	21	1	1	19	15	98	−83	4	Relegated to the Mainland Championship

Rules for classification: 1) Points; 2) Goal difference; 3) Goals scored; 4) Goals against; 5) Head to head; 6) Disciplinary record; 7) Coin toss
(C) Champions; (R) Relegated

=== 2020 FootballSouth Premier League ===
Pos	Team	Pld	W	D	L	GF	GA	GD	Pts	Qualification
1	Green Island	8	8	0	0	26	6	+20	24	Qualification for the Championship round
2	Mosgiel	8	6	1	1	43	7	+36	19	Qualification for the Championship round
3	Otago University	8	6	0	2	22	10	+12	18	Qualification for the Championship round
4	Wanaka	8	4	0	4	18	27	−9	12	Qualification for the Championship round
5	Queenstown	8	3	1	4	32	19	+13	10	Qualification for the Second round
6	Caversham	8	2	2	4	19	17	+2	8	Qualification for the Second round
7	Dunedin Technical	8	2	1	5	8	23	−15	7	Qualification for the Second round
8	Roslyn-Wakari	8	2	1	5	11	18	−7	7	Qualification for the Second round
9	Northern	8	0	0	8	4	56	−52	0	Qualification for the Second round

Rules for classification: 1) Points; 2) Goal difference; 3) Goals scored; 4) Goals against; 5) Head to head; 6) Disciplinary record; 7) Coin toss

==== Championship round ====
Pos	Team	Pld	W	D	L	GF	GA	GD	Pts
1	Green Island (C)	14	11	1	2	41	18	+23	34
2	Mosgiel	14	9	2	3	57	18	+39	29
3	Otago University	14	9	0	5	37	22	+15	27
4	Wanaka	14	6	0	8	27	45	−18	18

Rules for classification: 1) Points; 2) Goal difference; 3) Goals scored; 4) Goals against; 5) Head to head; 6) Disciplinary record; 7) Coin toss
(C) Champions

==== Second round ====
Pos	Team	Pld	W	D	L	GF	GA	GD	Pts
1	Queenstown	12	6	1	5	43	25	+18	19
2	Caversham	12	5	2	5	34	26	+8	17
3	Roslyn-Wakari	12	4	1	7	20	24	−4	13
4	Dunedin Technical	12	4	1	7	16	34	−18	13
5	Northern	12	0	0	12	8	71	−63	0

Rules for classification: 1) Points; 2) Goal difference; 3) Goals scored; 4) Goals against; 5) Head to head; 6) Disciplinary record; 7) Coin toss

=== Cup competitions ===
==== Charity Cup ====
This match also doubled as a NZFC match.

7 February 2021
15:45 NZST

Auckland City	3–1	Team Wellington
Manickum 50'; Howieson 70' (pen.); Rogerson 72'	Report	Watson 75'

Kiwitea Street, Auckland
Referee: Matthew Conger

== Women's football ==
=== Women's Premiership ===
Pos	Team	Pld	W	D	L	GF	GA	GD	Pts	Qualification
1	Canterbury United Pride (C)	6	6	0	0	23	3	+20	18	Qualification to the Final
2	Capital	6	4	1	1	11	5	+6	13	Qualification to the Final
3	Northern Lights	6	3	1	2	13	6	+7	10	
4	Southern United	6	2	0	4	6	18	−12	6	
5	WaiBOP	6	1	2	3	11	14	−3	5	
6	Auckland (Note: Auckland Football forfeited three matches (losing 9 points) for fielding an ineligible player in their Round 1, 2 and 3 games against Central Football, Canterbury United Pride and Capital Football and the results recorded as 3–0 wins for the opposition.)	6	1	1	4	8	17	−9	4	
7	Central Football	6	1	1	4	7	16	−9	4	

Source: NZ Football
Rules for classification: 1) points; 2) goal difference; 3) number of goals scored.
(C) Champions

==== Grand final ====
20 December 2020
14:00

Canterbury United Pride	4–0	Capital Football
Rennie 53', 71'; Nicholson 79'; Dominikovich 85'	Report

English Park, Christchurch
Referee: Sarah Jones
