= 2018 National Women's League (New Zealand) =

National Women's League
- Season: 2018
- Champions: Canterbury United Pride
- Matches: 43
- Goals: 193 (4.49 per match)
- Top goalscorer: Sarah Gregorius (12 goals)
- Biggest home win: Canterbury United Pride 8–0 Central (11 November 2018)
- Biggest away win: Central 0–7 Canterbury United Pride (30 September 2018)
- Highest scoring: Central 2–8 Southern United (2 December 2018)
- All statistics correct as of 16 December 2018.

The 2018 National Women's League was the sixteenth season of the NWL, New Zealand's top level women's football league since its establishment in 2002. Seven teams were again involved in this season representing the different regions in New Zealand. This was the first year that the league had two rounds with the two highest-placed sides progressing to a one-off grand final. The season also featured a double header round over Labour weekend, in which all sides except Capital played two matches over the weekend.

== Teams ==
Locations of the 2018 National Women's League Teams

Team	Location	Ground	Coach
Northern Lights	North Shore	QBE Stadium, Domain 3	Gemma Lewis
Auckland	Auckland	McLennan Park	Tracy Wrigley
WaiBOP	Hamilton	Gower Park	Michael Mayne
Central Football	Palmerston North	Massey Uni	Donald Piper
Capital	Lower Hutt	Memorial Park	Emma Evans
Canterbury United Pride	Christchurch	English Park	Alana Gunn
Southern United	Dunedin	Tahuna Park	Rignacio Sande

== Regular season ==
=== League table ===
Pos	Team	Pld	W	D	L	GF	GA	GD	Pts	Qualification
1	Northern Lights	12	9	2	1	33	8	+25	29	Qualification to the Final
2	Canterbury United Pride (C)	12	9	0	3	41	14	+27	27	Qualification to the Final
3	Auckland	12	6	4	2	26	11	+15	22	
4	Capital	12	6	2	4	32	27	+5	20	
5	Southern United	12	5	1	6	37	28	+9	16	
6	WaiBOP	12	1	1	10	14	36	−22	4	
7	Central Football	12	1	0	11	5	64	−59	3	

Source: The Ultimate New Zealand Soccer Website
Rules for classification: 1) points; 2) goal difference; 3) number of goals scored.
(C) Champions

=== Positions by round ===
Team ╲ Round	1	2	3	4	5	6	7	8	9	10	11	12	13
Auckland	2	3	2	4	2	3	3	3	3	3	3	3	3
Canterbury United Pride	2	1	1	1	1	1	1	1	1	1	2	2	2
Capital	5	4	5	5	5	5	4	4	4	4	4	4	4
Central Football	7	6	7	7	7	7	7	7	7	7	7	7	7
Northern Lights	4	5	4	2	3	2	2	2	2	2	1	1	1
Southern United	1	2	3	3	4	4	5	5	5	5	5	5	5
WaiBOP	5	7	6	6	6	6	6	6	6	6	6	6	6

Qualification to Grand final

Source: NZ Football

=== Fixtures and results ===
New Zealand women's football league matches took place from September to December 2018 and also for the first time include a double header round over Labour weekend.

==== Round 1 ====
15 September 2018	Southern United	6–1	Central Football	Forrester Park, Dunedin
15:00	Whittaker 8'; Smith 20', 28'; Nicholson 24'; Hislop 50'; 69' (o.g.)	Report	Crewe 12'	Referee: Wendy McNeely

15 September 2018	WaiBOP	0–4	Auckland	Gower Park, Hamilton
14:00		Report	Parris 52', 75'; Muirhead 68'; Carter 71' (pen.)	Referee: Bridget Baker

16 September 2018	Canterbury United Pride	4–0	Capital	English Park, Christchurch
13:00	Longo 15', 28'; Rennie 46'; Barker 54'	Report		Referee: Lindsey Robinson

Bye: Northern Lights

==== Round 2 ====
22 September 2018	Canterbury United Pride	6–0	WaiBOP	English Park, Christchurch
12:00	Barker 2', 21', 87'; Rennie 14'; Stewart 32'; Longo 90+3'	Report		Referee: Michael Killick

23 September 2018	Northern Lights	0–0	Southern United	McFetridge Park, North Shore
13:00		Report		Referee: Lindsey Robinson

23 September 2018	Central Football	0–5	Capital	Massey Uni, Palmerston North
14:00		Report	Boone 10'; Main 46'; Gregorius 52', 61'; Wilford-Carroll 68'	Referee: Beth Rattray

Bye: Auckland

==== Round 3 ====
29 September 2018	Capital	1–4	Northern Lights	Memorial Park, Lower Hutt
13:30	Main 24'	Report	Kelderman 24'; Bunge 43'; Savage 85'; Tawharu 88'	Referee: Morgan Archer

30 September 2018	Central Football	0–7	Canterbury United Pride	Massey Uni, Palmerston North
13:30		Report	Abbott 4'; 11', 53' (o.g.); Rennie 35'; Longo 61'; Taylor 80'; Stewart 90+4'	Referee: Bridget Baker

30 September 2018	Southern United	1–2	Auckland	Tahuna Park, Dunedin
14:00	20' (o.g.)	Report	Muirhead 63'; Carter 90+4'	Referee: Nadia Browning

Bye: WaiBOP

==== Round 4 ====
7 October 2018	WaiBOP	3–6	Southern United	McLennan Park, Auckland
11:00	Brady 45'; Golding 61'; Wisnewski 73'	Report	Morison 37'; Wall 45'; Gray 54'; Hayr 60'; Anderson 67', 79'	Referee: Morgan Archer

7 October 2018	Northern Lights	7–0	Central Football	McFetridge Park, North Shore
13:30	Tawharu 18'; Jenkins 32', 40'; Steinmetz 57'; Stevens 63'; Mittendorf 65'; Kelderman 73'	Report		Referee: Wendy McNeely

7 October 2018	Auckland	1–1	Capital	McLennan Park, Auckland
14:00	80' (o.g.)	Report	Wilford-Carrol 45'	Referee: Anna-Marie Keighley

Bye: Canterbury United Pride

==== Round 5 ====
13 October 2018	Capital	2–1	WaiBOP	Memorial Park, Lower Hutt
13:00	Wilford-Carroll 89'; Gregorius 90+3'	Report	Brown 39'	Referee: Lindsey Robinson

14 October 2018	Northern Lights	1–2	Canterbury United Pride	McFetridge Park, North Shore
13:00	Bunge 19'	Report	Hepburn 36'; Taylor 82'	Referee: Sarah Jones

14 October 2018	Central Football	0–6	Auckland	Massey Uni, Palmerston North
13:00		Report	Parris 4', 56'; Carter 24' (pen.); Satchell 30'; Cunningham-Lee 71'; Morton 80'	Referee: Nadia Browning

Bye: Southern United

==== Round 6 (Double Header Week) ====
19 October 2018	Auckland	0–0	Northern Lights	McLennan Park, Auckland
19:00		Report		Referee: Wendy McNeely

20 October 2018	Canterbury United Pride	3–1	Southern United	English Park, Christchurch
13:00	Barker 19'; Rennie 66', 81'	Report	Nicholson 25'	Referee: Michael Killick

20 October 2018	WaiBOP	0–1	Central Football	Massey Uni, Palmerston North
14:00		Report	Lancaster 90+2'	Referee: Bridget Baker

22 October 2018	Central Football	0–3	WaiBOP	Massey Uni, Palmerston North
13:00		Report	Brown 21', 46', 78'	Referee: Morgan Archer

22 October 2018	Southern United	1–3	Canterbury United Pride	Tahuna Park, Dunedin
14:00	Anderson 5'	Report	Taylor 9', 53'; Fraser 45+2' (pen.)	Referee: Lindsey Robinson

23 October 2018	Northern Lights	2–0	Auckland	QBE Stadium, North Shore
19:15	Steinmetz 44'; Stevens 68'	Report		Referee: Anne-Marie Keighley

Bye: Capital

==== Round 7 ====
27 October 2018	Capital	3–1	Southern United	Memorial Park, Lower Hutt
14:00	Gregorius 10', 84'; McPhie 40'	Report	Smith 13'	Referee: Sarah Jones

28 October 2018	Northern Lights	3–0	WaiBOP	McFetridge Park, North Shore
13:00	Stevens 14'; Stratford 79'; 89' (o.g.)	Report		Referee: Morgan Archer

28 October 2018	Auckland	3–1	Canterbury United Pride	McLennan Park, Auckland
14:00	Jale 14'; Satchell 49'; Parris 69'	Report	Longo 53'	Referee: Nadia Browning

Bye: Central

==== Round 8 ====
3 November 2018	WaiBOP	1–3	Canterbury United Pride	Gower Park, Hamilton
13:00	Cawte 45+2'	Report	Longo 14'; Hepburn 26'; Taylor 82'	Referee: Nadia Browning

3 November 2018	Capital	5–0	Central Football	Memorial Park, Lower Hutt
14:00	Green 12', 90+1'; Gregorius 21', 81'; Main 51'	Report		Referee: Wendy McNeely

4 November 2018	Southern United	1–2	Northern Lights	Tahuna Park, Dunedin
13:30	Nicholson 59'	Report	Turnbull 27'; Tawharu 49'	Referee: Dan Woulahan

Bye: Auckland

==== Round 9 ====
11 November 2018	Northern Lights	4–2	Capital	McFetridge Park, North Shore
13:00	Loye 7'; Pritchard 54', 66'; Barnett 65'	Report	Gregorius 22'; Ohlsson 55'	Referee: Morgan Archer

11 November 2018	Auckland	3–2	Southern United	McLennan Park, Auckland
14:00	Jale 36', 69'; Mettam 75'	Report	Morison 29', 38'	Referee: Nadia Browning

11 November 2018	Canterbury United Pride	8–0	Central Football	English Park, Christchurch
14:00	Taylor 13', 56', 67'; Wong 15'; Jones 43'; Donald 54'; Hepburn 58'; Longo 90+4'	Report		Referee: Lindsey Robinson

Bye: WaiBOP

==== Round 10 ====
17 November 2018	WaiBOP	2–3	Capital	Gower Park, Hamilton
14:00	Hooper 32'; Brady 79'	Report	Robertson 82', 90'; Boone 90+5'	Referee: Wendy McNeely

18 November 2018	Auckland	4–0	Central Football	McLennan Park, Auckland
13:00	Parris 21'; Leong 50', 64'; Muirhead 74'	Report		Referee: Bridger Baker

18 November 2018	Canterbury United Pride	0–3	Northern Lights	English Park, Christchurch
13:30		Report	Turnbull 21'; Pritchard 34'; Stevens 61'	Referee: Anna-Marie Keighley

Bye: Southern United

==== Round 11 ====
24 November 2018	Capital	2–2	Auckland	Memorial Park, Lower Hutt
13:00	McPhie 37'; Boone 63'	Report	Parris 45+1'; Morrissey 88'	Referee: Lindsey Robinson

25 November 2018	Southern United	5–2	WaiBOP	Forrester Park, Dunedin
11:00	Morrison 1'; Gray 2'; Brown 29', 85'; Wall 75'	Report	Elliott 32'; Golding 37'	Referee: Wendy McNeely

25 November 2018	Central Football	1–5	Northern Lights	Massey Uni, Palmerston North
13:00	Pritchard 23'; Barnett 30', 80'; Savage 70'; Stratford 74'	Report	Ralph 72'	Referee: Andrew Turner

Bye: Canterbury United Pride

==== Round 12 ====
1 December 2018	Capital	4–3	Canterbury United Pride	Memorial Park, Lower Hutt
14:00	Bryant 9'; Main 25'; Boone 81'; Ohlsson 90'	Report	Hepburn 17'; Taylor 36', 73'	Referee: Andrew Turner

2 December 2018	Central Football	2–8	Southern United	Massey Uni, Palmerston North
12:00	Frank 20', 55'	Report	Morison 5', 42'; Gray 10'; Smith 47'; Nicholson 50'; Bacon 57'; Wall 63'; de Ronde 76'	Referee: Wendy McNeely

2 December 2018	Auckland	1–1	WaiBOP	McLennan Park, Auckland
14:00	Leong 90+3'	Report	Muspratt 73'	Referee: Bridget Baker

Bye: Northern Lights

==== Round 13 ====
8 December 2018	Canterbury United Pride	1–0	Auckland	English Park, Christchurch
13:00	Rennie 38'	Report

8 December 2018	WaiBOP	1–2	Northern Lights	Gower Park, Hamilton
14:00	Henderson 21'	Report	Pritchard 71', 83'	Referee: Sarah Jones

9 December 2018	Southern United	5–4	Capital	Sunnyvale Park, Dunedin
14:00	Smith 8' (pen.); Whittaker 20'; Bacon 47', 56'; Gray 74'	Report	Gregorius 33' (pen.), 52' (pen.), 56', 78' (pen.)	Referee: Morgan Archer

Bye: Central

== Final ==
16 December 2018
13:05

Northern Lights	2–3 (a.e.t.)	Canterbury United Pride
Barnett 7'; Bunge 40'	Report	Longo 16', 31'; Barker 102'

The Trusts Arena, Auckland
Referee: Morgan Archer

== Statistics ==
As of 9 December 2018

=== Top scorers ===
Rank	Player	Club	Goals
1	Sarah Gregorius	Capital	12
2	Cody Taylor	Canterbury United Pride	10
3	Annalie Longo	Canterbury United Pride	7
3	Jade Parris	Auckland	7
5	Emily Morison	Southern United	6
5	Ava Pritchard	Northern Lights	6
5	Gabi Rennie	Canterbury United Pride	6
8	Monique Barker	Canterbury United Pride	5
8	Shontelle Smith	Southern United	5
10	Meisha Boone	Capital	4
10	Kelli Brown	WaiBOP	4
10	Mikayla Gray	Southern United	4
10	Whitney Hepburn	Canterbury United Pride	4
10	Emma Main	Capital	4
10	Britney-Lee Nicholson	Southern United	4
10	Dayna Stevens	Northern Lights	4

=== Hat-tricks ===
Player	For	Against	Result	Date	Ref
Monique Barker	Canterbury United Pride	WaiBOP	6–0	23 September 2018	
Kelli Brown	WaiBOP	Central Football	3–0	22 October 2018	
Cody Taylor	Canterbury United Pride	Central Football	8–0	11 November 2018	
Sarah Gregorius	Capital	Southern United	4–5	9 December 2018	

=== Own goals ===
Player	Club	Against	Round
Mackenzie Barry	Central Football	Southern United	1
Mackenzie Barry	Central Football	Canterbury United Pride	3
Kate Watson	Central Football	Canterbury United Pride	3
Bianca Stiles	Auckland	Southern United	3
Meisha Boone	Capital	Auckland	4
Ashley Weld	WaiBOP	Northern Lights	7
