= 2019 National Women's League (New Zealand) =

National Women's League
- Season: 2019
- Champions: Canterbury United Pride
- Matches: 42
- Goals: 150 (3.57 per match)
- Top goalscorer: Emma Rolston (10)
- Biggest home win: Capital 8-0 WaiBOP (28 October 2019)
- Biggest away win: WaiBOP 0–5 Canterbury United Pride (6 October 2019); WaiBOP 0–5 Capital (26 October 2019)
- Highest scoring: Southern United 5–5 Northern Lights (29 September 2019)
- Longest winning run: Canterbury United Pride (4 games)
- Longest unbeaten run: Northern Lights (13 games)
- Longest winless run: Central (12 games)
- Longest losing run: Central (11 games)
- All statistics correct as of 15 December 2019.

The 2019 National Women's League was the seventeenth season of the NWL, New Zealand's top level women's football league since its establishment in 2002. Seven teams were involved in this season representing the different regions in New Zealand. This was the second year that the league played two rounds, with the two highest-placed sides progressing to a one-off grand final. The season also featured a double header round over Labour weekend, in which all sides except Central played two matches over the weekend.

== Teams ==
Locations of the 2019 National Women's League Teams

Team	Location	Ground	Coach
Northern Lights	North Shore	Allen Hill Stadium	Shane Verma
Auckland	Auckland	McLennan Park	Nic Downes
WaiBOP	Cambridge	John Kerkhof Park	Nico Girard
Central Football	Palmerston North	Massey Uni	Barry Scullion
Capital	Lower Hutt	Petone Memorial Park	Natalie Lawrence
Canterbury United Pride	Christchurch	English Park	Alana Gunn
Southern United	Dunedin	Logan Park	Nick Pierce

== Regular season ==
=== League table ===
Pos	Team	Pld	W	D	L	GF	GA	GD	Pts	Qualification
1	Canterbury United Pride (C)	12	10	1	1	36	8	+28	31	Qualification to the Final
2	Northern Lights	12	7	5	0	28	8	+20	26	Qualification to the Final
3	Auckland	12	6	4	2	20	13	+7	22	
4	Southern United	12	6	2	4	27	20	+7	20	
5	Capital	12	3	2	7	24	28	−4	11	
6	WaiBOP	12	2	1	9	6	33	−27	7	
7	Central Football	12	0	1	11	9	40	−31	1	

Source: The Ultimate New Zealand Soccer Website
Rules for classification: 1) points; 2) goal difference; 3) number of goals scored.
(C) Champions

*Round 13 match between WaiBOP and Northern Lights was abandoned at half-time with the score 0-0
**Round 13 match between Central and Capital was postponed due to inclement weather and road closures. Was not played and declared a 0–0 draw

=== Positions by round ===
Team ╲ Round	1	2	3	4	5	6	7	8	9	10	11	12	13
Auckland	3	3	3	3	4	4	3	3	3	4	3	3	3
Canterbury United Pride	1	1	2	1	1	2	1	1	1	1	1	1	1
Capital	6	6	6	6	5	5	5	4	5	5	5	5	5
Central Football	6	7	7	7	7	7	7	7	7	7	7	7	7
Northern Lights	4	4	4	2	2	1	2	2	2	2	2	2	2
Southern United	1	2	1	4	3	3	4	5	4	3	4	4	4
WaiBOP	5	5	5	5	6	6	6	6	6	6	6	6	6

Qualification to Grand final

Source: NZ Football

=== Fixtures and results ===
New Zealand women's football league matches took place from September to December 2019 and for the second year running, included a double header round over the Labour weekend.

==== Round 1 ====
15 September 2019	Southern United	6–0	Central Football	Logan Park, Dunedin
12:00	Smith 2' (pen.); Whittaker 24'; Mackay-Wright 32'; de Ronde 63'; Gray 66'; Anderson 88'	Report

15 September 2019	Canterbury United Pride	6–0	Capital	English Park, Christchurch
13:00	Dominikovich 25'; van Noorden 49'; Hepburn 72', 84'; Donald 75'; Nicholson 82'	Report

15 September 2019	WaiBOP	0–3	Auckland	John Kerkhof Park, Cambridge
14:00		Report	Skilton 7'; Duncan 22'; Cunningham-Lee 77'

Bye: Northern Lights

==== Round 2 ====
22 September 2019	WaiBOP	0–1	Southern United	John Kerkhof Park, Cambridge
12:00		Report	Hislop 85' (pen.)

22 September 2019	Northern Lights	2–0	Capital	Allen Hill Stadium, North Shore
13:00	Knott 32', 45' (pen.)	Report

22 September 2019	Canterbury United Pride	4–0	Central Football	English Park, Christchurch
14:00	Nicholson 2'; Dominikovich 23'; Herman-Watt 48'; Stewart 89'	Report

Bye: Auckland

==== Round 3 ====
29 September 2019	Southern United	5–5	Northern Lights	Rugby Park, Invercargill
13:00	Smith 6'; Gray 9'; Hayr 33'; Hislop 61' (pen.), 85'	Report	Kelderman 3'; Brown 44', 50'; Jervis 81'; Knott 90+3'

29 September 2019	Capital	3–3	Auckland	Petone Memorial Park, Lower Hutt
14:00	Robertson 5'; Robertson 58'; Rolston 90' (pen.)	Report	Cunningham-Lee 55'; Marthe 79'; Carter 84'

29 September 2019	Central Football	2–5	WaiBOP	Massey Uni, Palmerston North
15:00	Olson 11'; Lyne-Lewis 76' (pen.)	Report	Wisnewski 5', 60'; Heuvel 45+1', 81'; Trebes 88'

Bye: Canterbury United

==== Round 4 ====
6 October 2019	WaiBOP	0–5	Canterbury United Pride	John Kerkhof Park, Cambridge
12:00		Report	Lake 6'; Nicholson 56', 74'; Stewart 75'; Fraser 87' (pen.)

6 October 2019	Northern Lights	7–1	Central Football	Allen Hill Stadium, North Shore
13:00	Wasi 19'; Knott 36'; Vosper 45+1'; Brown 68'; Pritchard 75'; Stevens 86'; Maynard 90'	Report	Olson 63'

6 October 2019	Auckland	4–2	Southern United	McLennan Park, Auckland
14:00	Cunningham-Lee 2', 76'; Skilton 45+2'; Leong 78'	Report	Anderson 29'; Hayr 60'

Bye: Capital

==== Round 5 ====
12 October 2019	Capital	3–2	Central Football	Petone Memorial Park, Lower Hutt
14:00	Rolston 27'; Wilkinson 45+1'; Barrott 88' (pen.)	Report	Boxall 57' (pen.), 75'

13 October 2019	Northern Lights	2–0	WaiBOP	Allen Hill Stadium, North Shore
13:00	Pritchard 16', 80'	Report

13 October 2019	Auckland	0–1	Canterbury United Pride	Kiwitea Street, Auckland
13:30		Report	Nicholson 42'

Bye: Southern United

==== Round 6 ====
19 October 2019	Canterbury United Pride	1–3	Northern Lights	English Park, Christchurch
13:00	Rennie 86'	Report	Maynard 26'; Pritchard 31'; Brown 48'

19 October 2019	Southern United	4–2	Capital	Logan Park, Dunedin
13:00	Anderson 16', 29'; Hislop 24'; Roxburgh 83'	Report	Rolston 54'; Watts 89'

20 October 2019	Central Football	1–2	Auckland	Massey Uni, Palmerston North
13:00	Boxall 5'	Report	Cunningham-Lee 59'; Anton 80'

Bye: WaiBOP

==== Round 7 (Double Header Week) ====
24 October 2019	Auckland	0–0	Northern Lights	McLennan Park, Auckland
19:30		Report

26 October 2019	Southern United	0–2	Canterbury United Pride	Logan Park, Dunedin
13:00		Report	van Noorden 25'; Rennie 32'

26 October 2019	WaiBOP	0–5	Capital	John Kerkhof Park, Cambridge
13:30		Report	Barrott 4'; Wilkinson 8'; Ohlsson 60'; Rolston 66'; Catherwood 87'

28 October 2019	Canterbury United Pride	3–2	Southern United	English Park, Christchurch
13:00	Rennie 40'; Nicholson 65', 77'	Report	Smith 10'; Bacon 32'

28 October 2019	Capital	8–0	WaiBOP	Petone Memorial Park, Lower Hutt
13:00	Rolston 2', 31', 45+1', 52'; Barrott 16', 20'; Wilkinson 49'; Boobyer 90+1'	Report

29 October 2019	Northern Lights	1–1	Auckland	North Harbour Stadium, Auckland
19:00	Vosper 7'	Report	Skilton 43'

Bye: Central

==== Round 8 ====
2 November 2019	Capital	1–4	Canterbury United Pride	Petone Memorial Park, Lower Hutt
13:00	Robertson 79'	Report	Dominikovich 30'; Rennie 55'; Nicholson 66', 83'

3 November 2019	Central Football	0–1	Southern United	Massey Uni, Palmerston North
11:00		Report	Hislop 17'

3 November 2019	Auckland	1–0	WaiBOP	McLennan Park, Auckland
14:00	Cunningham-Lee 10'	Report

Bye: Northern Lights

==== Round 9 ====
9 November 2019	Central Football	2–5	Canterbury United Pride	Massey Uni, Palmerston North
12:00	Barry 53'; Lancaster 80'	Report	3' (o.g.); Jones 49'; Wall 70'; Rennie 88'; Stewart 90+2'

9 November 2019	Capital	0–2	Northern Lights	Petone Memorial Park, Lower Hutt
14:00		Report	Knott 2'; Pretty 90+3'

10 November 2019	Southern United	3–0	WaiBOP	Logan Park, Dunedin
12:00	Bacon 1'; Hislop 41'; Morison 87'	Report

Bye: Auckland

==== Round 10 ====
17 November 2019	Northern Lights	2–0	Southern United	Allen Hill Stadium, North Shore
14:00	Jenkins 29', 34'	Report

17 November 2019	WaiBOP	1–0	Central Football	John Kerkhof Park, Cambridge
14:00	Evans 68'	Report

17 November 2019	Auckland	3–1	Capital	McLennan Park, Auckland
14:00	Skilton 13'; Dewell 79'; Cunningham-Lee 83'	Report	Rolston 46'

Bye: Canterbury United

==== Round 11 ====
23 November 2019	Canterbury United Pride	3–0	WaiBOP	English Park, Christchurch
12:00	Rennie 18'; Dominikovich 45+2', 77'	Report

23 November 2019	Southern United	1–1	Auckland	Forsyth Barr Stadium, Dunedin
13:00	Bacon 1'	Report	Dewell 16'

24 November 2019	Central Football	0–4	Northern Lights	Massey Uni, Palmerston North
13:00		Report	Pritchard 10'; Savage 32', 82'; Brown 69'

Bye: Capital

==== Round 12 ====
30 November 2019	Capital	1–2	Southern United	Petone Memorial Park, Lower Hutt
11:00	Rolston 61'	Report	Morison 2'; Bacon 88'

1 December 2019	Northern Lights	0–0	Canterbury United Pride	Allen Hill Stadium, North Shore
13:00		Report

1 December 2019	Auckland	2–1	Central Football	McLennan Park, Auckland
14:00	Skilton 39', 71'	Report	Olson 7'

Bye: WaiBOP

==== Round 13 ====
7 December 2019	Canterbury United Pride	2–0	Auckland	English Park, Christchurch
13:00	Rennie 12'; Hepburn 90'	Report

8 December 2019	WaiBOP	0–0*	Northern Lights	John Kerkhof Park, Cambridge
14:00		Report

8 December 2019	Central Football	postponed**	Capital	Massey Uni, Palmerston North
14:00		Report	https://www.nzfootball.co.nz/newsarticle/85209

Bye: Southern United
*Match abandoned at half-time with the score 0-0
**Postponed due to inclement weather and road closures. Not going to be played so declared a 0–0 draw

== Final ==
15 December 2019
14:00

Canterbury United Pride	1–1 (a.e.t.)	Northern Lights
Dominikovich 56'	Report	Brown 64'
Penalties
Lake (penalty scored); van Noorden (penalty scored); Dabner (penalty scored); Nicholson (penalty scored)	4–2	(penalty scored) Savage; (penalty missed) Knott; (penalty scored) Jenkins; (penalty missed) Brown

English Park, Christchurch
Referee: Anna-Marie Keighley

== Statistics ==
As of 11 December 2019

=== Top scorers ===
Rank	Player	Club	Goals
1	Emma Rolston	Capital Football	10
2	Britney-Lee Nicholson	Canterbury United Pride	9
3	Britney Cunningham-Lee	Auckland Football	7
3	Gabi Rennie	Canterbury United Pride	7
5	Amy Hislop	Southern United	6
6	Kelli Brown	Northern Lights	5
6	Nicola Dominikovich	Canterbury United Pride	5
6	Chloe Knott	Northern Lights	5
6	Ava Pritchard	Northern Lights	5
6	Steph Skilton	Auckland Football	5
11	Ruby Anderson	Southern United	4
11	Renee Bacon	Southern United	4
11	Kelsey Wilkinson	Capital Football	4

=== Hat-tricks ===
Player	For	Against	Result	Date	Ref
Emma Rolston	Capital Football	WaiBOP	8–0	29 October 2019	
