= New Zealand Youth National League =

- Founded: 2003; 23 years ago Rebranded 2022; 4 years ago
- Country: New Zealand
- Confederation: OFC (Oceania)
- Number of clubs: 8
- Current champions: Wellington Phoenix Academy (2nd title) (2024)
- Most championships: Auckland City (7 titles)
- Website: Official web page

The New Zealand Youth National League, formally National Youth League (NYL), is the premier competition for youth football players in New Zealand. Founded in 2003, it was a league competition consisting of the youth teams of each of the ten clubs that played in the New Zealand Football Championship. It was held each season between October and December, and consists of each team playing each other once; the fixture list mirrors that of the senior league.

The last team to be champions of the original league and the most successful team of the competition was the youth team of Auckland City, finishing champions seven times in the sixteen years the original competition ran.

In December 2021, New Zealand Football announced that they were bringing back the National Youth Development League to run alongside the National League. The Competition will see eight teams from 3 qualifying leagues play-off in a knockout style tournament. Three teams qualify from the Northern League, three qualify from the Central League and two qualify from the Southern League.

The regional leagues will run from August through to late September. The finals series will take place at a neutral location in October and will see all eight teams play 3 games in a knockout style competition.

Wellington Phoenix Academy are the defending champions after winning the 2023 and 2024 editions.

== History ==
The first National Youth League was founded in 2003, with eight teams representing different regional football federations in New Zealand, playing each other once; the inaugural champions were Capital Soccer.

In 2007, the competition changed from teams representing federations to teams representing each club in the New Zealand Football Championship. The youth squad of Auckland City won the first season of this new format, and have since become the most successful team in the competition, winning six titles.

In 2008, the competition used a ten-team, two-group format, with the top two teams from each group heading into a playoff system; Waitakere United won in the final against Canterbury United. However, in 2009, only four teams participated due to funding issues (Auckland City, Waitakere United, Auckland-Manukau and Hawke's Bay United); the league moved to nine teams in late 2010 following the league's rebrand to the ASB Premiership, still following the two-group format.

The 2013 season introduced two more teams to make a twelve-team, two-group league, but in 2014 the format was amended to mirror the New Zealand Football Championship; each league team fielded a youth team in the National Youth league, with the competitions returning to its one-group format.

In the 2016 season, mirroring the club movements of the New Zealand Football Championship, Hamilton Wanderers replaced the outgoing WaiBOP United and both newly founded teams Tasman United and Eastern Suburbs fielded sides in the competition. Surprisingly, Hamilton Wanderers won the title at their first attempt under the leadership of first-team players Michael Built and Adam Luque.

After a review by New Zealand Football of all their national competitions, it was decided to end the national youth competition. Instead each club from the New Zealand Football Championship will have to register 40 players, of which 17 of them have to be aged 21 or under. They will also work with the local federations the clubs are assigned with, to run a development team in the regional leagues.

In the last season of the old competition, Auckland City won its seventh title as well as winning three in a row from 2017 to 2019 to finish as Champions of the competition.

In 2021, New Zealand Football announced the reintroduction of the National Youth League as an U-17 competition that will run alongside the National League.

== Current teams ==
Team	Location	First season	Head Coach
Auckland City	Sandringham, Auckland	2007	(England) Jay Blake
Auckland United	Mount Roskill, Auckland	2022	(New Zealand) Mark Atkinson
Christchurch United	Yaldhurst, Christchurch	2024	(New Zealand) Jude Fitzpatrick
Fencibles United	Pakuranga, Auckland	2023	(India) Royston Dsouza
Miramar Rangers	Miramar, Wellington	2024	(New Zealand) Curtis Jones
Onslow/North Wellington	Johnsonville, Wellington	2022	(New Zealand) Andrew Vines
Nelson-Marlborough	Nelson/Marlborough	2024	(England) Neil Harding
Wellington Phoenix Academy	Taitā, Lower Hutt	2014	(United States) Joshua Neff

== Former teams ==
=== National Youth League ===
Location of all clubs in New Zealand for all seasons of the league

Team	City, Region	Stadium	Joined	Left
Auckland City	Auckland, Auckland	Kiwitea Street	2007	2019 (Note: Participating in the Youth National League) (Note: Participating in the Youth Northern League)
Auckland United	Auckland, Auckland	Mangere Centre Park	2014	2015
Canterbury United	Christchurch, Canterbury	English Park	2007	2019
Eastern Suburbs	Auckland, Auckland	Ngahue Reserve	2016	2019
Hamilton Wanderers	Hamilton, Waikato	John Kerkhof Park	2016	2019
Heartland Wairarapa	Palmerston North	Memorial Park	2014	2015
Hawke's Bay United	Napier, Hawke's Bay	Bluewater Stadium	2007	2019
Nelson-Marlborough	The Wood, Nelson	Trafalgar Park	2013	2015 (Note: Participating in the Youth Southern League)
Southern United	Dunedin, Otago	Tahuna Park	2007	2019
Tasman United	Stoke, Nelson	Saxton Field	2016	2019
Team Wellington	Wellington, Wellington	Memorial Park	2007	2019
Waikato FC	Cambridge, Waikato	John Kerkhof Park	2007	2016
Waitakere United	Whenuapai, Auckland	Seddon Fields	2007	2019
Wanderers SC	North Shore, Auckland	North Harbour Stadium	2014	2015
Wellington Phoenix Academy	Wellington, Wellington	Fraser Park	2014	2019 (Note: Participating in the Youth Central League)
YoungHeart Manawatu	Palmerston North, Manawatū-Whanganui	Memorial Park	2007	2015

Name Changes

- Napier City Rovers → Hawke's Bay United
- Otago United → Southern United
- Waikato FC → WaiBOP United

=== Youth National League ===
Team	Location	Last Participated	Head Coach
Birkenhead United	Beach Haven, Auckland	2023	
Cashmere Technical	Woolston, Christchurch	2022	(Republic of Ireland) Garbhan Coughlan
Nomads United	Casebrook, Christchurch	2023	(New Zealand) Matthew Jansen
Selwyn United	Rolleston	2023	
Tauranga City	Mount Maunganui, Tauranga	2022	(New Zealand) Maia Ririnui
Western Suburbs	Wellington, Wellington	2023	(New Zealand) Tyler Logan

== Champions ==
National Youth League

Season	Champion
2003	Capital Soccer
2004	United Soccer 1
2005	Capital Soccer
2006	Capital Soccer
2007	Auckland City
2008	Waitakere United
2009	Auckland City
2010	Waitakere United
2011	Canterbury United
2012	Auckland City
2013	Auckland City
2014	Nelson Falcons
2015	Team Wellington
2016	Hamilton Wanderers
2017	Auckland City
2018	Auckland City
2019	Auckland City

Youth National League

Season	Champions
2022	Auckland United
2023	Wellington Phoenix Academy
2024	Wellington Phoenix Academy
