= New Zealand national under-19 schoolboys football team =

Youth football team representing New Zealand

New Zealand U19
- Nickname(s): Schools, Schoolboys
- Association: NZSSFA
- Confederation: OFC (Oceania)
- Head coach: Simon Foy
- Home stadium: various
- FIFA code: NZL

The New Zealand under-19 secondary schools football team (also known as New Zealand U19 Schoolboys) represents New Zealand in association football at under-19 age-group level. It is controlled by the New Zealand Secondary Schools Football Association (NZSSFA) which is affiliated to New Zealand Football (NZF).

== History ==
=== Overview ===
The New Zealand U19 schoolboys national team "fills a vital role in the development of the international player pool in New Zealand in the gap between the under-17 and under-20 programs."

As all of New Zealand's top youth players attend secondary school full-time, the player pool for under-19 selections is the same as that of the under-17 program. The process begins with secondary schools nominating their best players to go forward for provincial trials. From this, 36 players are named to a national selection camp where a final 18-man squad is selected for international tournaments.

=== Competitions ===
Historically, the team travels to the United Kingdom every two years and plays against the Centenary Shield U18 and U19 national teams of England, Scotland, Wales, the Republic of Ireland and Northern Ireland. They have also competed in friendlies and tournaments in Austria, Korea, Australia and the United States. In 2021, the team will resume their four nations contest in the UK.

=== Recent Success ===
In 2013, the New Zealand under-19 schoolboys national team toured the United Kingdom under former Leeds United defender and now acclaimed NZ coach, Danny Hay, and they achieved the best set of results in history. The team drew 1–1 with both England and Scotland, beat Wales 2-1 and were victorious over prestigious five nations Centenary Shield champions, Northern Ireland, 2–0.

As a result of the team's impressive performances in 2013, numerous players including Judd Baker and Sam Brotherton were offered trials with professional clubs in the UK. Judd Baker was eventually signed by Premier League side Swansea City A.F.C. and is also a New Zealand under-20 international. Sam Brotherton, vice-captain of the 2013 squad, has since signed for Sunderland A.F.C. and represented New Zealand at U20, U23 and full international level. Arguably the most successful graduate since the program's inception in 2000 is goalkeeper, Stefan Marinovic, who as a result of his performances in Austria 2008, was offered trials with Everton FC, FC Zurich and FC Schalke 04. He is now the first-choice goalkeeper for the New Zealand senior national team and plays for the Vancouver Whitecaps in the MLS.

=== Rivalries ===
The team's loose rivals are Trans-Tasman neighbours Australia, having first played each other at Arlington Park, NSW on 25 August 1938. New Zealand has lost to Australia 2-0 in both 2016 and 2019.

== Coaching staff ==
Position	Name
Head coach	Simon Foy
Assistant coach	John Whittle
Goalkeeping coach	John Whittle
Manager	Neil Penfold
Physiotherapist	John O'Driscoll

== Current squad ==
The following players were named in the New Zealand U19 Schoolboys final 18-man squad on 10 December 2015 to tour Australia in July 2016.

Pos.	Player	Date of birth (age)	Apps	Goals	School	Club	Federation Talent Centre
GK	Calvin Lee	5 July 1998 (age 17)	3	0	Dilworth School	Eastern Suburbs AFC	Auckland
GK	Liam Outtrim	9 June 1998 (age 18)	3	0	Palmerston North Boys' High	Manawatu United	Central
DF	Liam Brown	27 November 1998 (age 17)	3	0	Howick College	Fencibles United AFC	Unattached
DF	Clarke Foulds	6 October 1998 (age 17)	2	0	Westlake Boys' High School	Waitakere United	Northern
DF	Jacob Masseurs	9 July 1998 (age 17)	3	0	Wellington College	Wanderers SC	Capital
DF	Thomas McCloy	12 January 1999 (age 17)	3	1	Sacred Heart College	Onehunga Sports FC	Auckland
DF	Anton Moore	22 January 1999 (age 17)	3	0	Mount Albert Grammar School	Waitakere United	Auckland
DF	Chris Walden	14 May 1998 (age 18)	2	0	Howick College	Fencibles United AFC	Auckland
MF	Quinton Kipara	25 February 1998 (age 18)	3	0	St. Peter's College, Cambridge	WaiBop United	Waikato Bay of Plenty
MF	Ryan Singh	2 November 1998 (age 17)	3	0	Albany Senior High School	East Coast Bays AFC	Northern
MF	Lachlan McIsaac	8 January 1998 (age 18)	3	1	Hamilton Boys' High School	WaiBop United	Waikato Bay of Plenty
MF	Zachary Newdick	22 August 1998 (age 17)	3	2	St. Paul's Collegiate	Hamilton Wanderers AFC	Waikato Bay of Plenty
MF	Van Roland	20 February 1999 (age 17)	0	0	Nelson College	Nelson Falcons	Unattached
MF	Oliver Whyte	20 January 2000 (age 16)	3	0	Scots College	Wellington Phoenix FC	Capital
FW	Drew Farnsworth	31 March 1998 (age 18)	2	1	New Plymouth Boys' High School	Team Taranaki	Central
FW	Mitchel Hanmore	15 March 1998 (age 18)	3	2	Excellere College	North Force FC	Unattached
FW	Jake Mechell	19 Jan 1999 (age 17)	3	1	St. Peter's College, Cambridge	WaiBop United	Waikato Bay of Plenty
FW	Fraser Norrington	10 October 1998 (age 17)	3	1	Rongotai College	Miramar Rangers AFC	Capital

Caps and goals correct at 10 December 2015
