= New Zealand Women's National League =

- Founded: 2002; 24 years ago
- Country: New Zealand
- Confederation: OFC
- Number of clubs: 10
- Level on pyramid: 1
- Domestic cup: Kate Sheppard Cup
- International cup: OFC Women's Champions League
- Current champions: Auckland United (3rd title) (2025)
- Most championships: Auckland Football (7 titles)
- Broadcaster(s): FIFA+ TVNZ (Highlights)
- Website: Official website
- Current: 2026 season

The New Zealand Women's National League, known as the Dettol Women's National League for sponsorship reasons (and formerly the National Women's League), is the top-level professional women's football (soccer) league in New Zealand. The teams were run by regional federations until 2021, when New Zealand Football started to move to club-based football.

== History ==
The National League was founded in 2002 and ran until a hiatus at the end of 2007. The league resumed in 2009 with five federations participating, as well as the national women's under-19 team development squad. As of 2024, the league has eight teams, one run by each federation.

The league ran in a pure round-robin format in 2002 and 2003. Playoffs started in 2004, with the second and third-placed teams competing in a one-legged semi-final. The winner of that and the first-place team then played in the Grand Final to decide the overall champion.

Following a hiatus in 2009, the league was divided into two divisions—a Northern Conference and a Southern Conference, each comprising four teams. At the end of the season, semi-finals were held, where the winner of each division played against the runner-up of the other division. The victorious teams then competed in the Grand Final. However, in 2013, the league reverted to its previous format.

From 2010 to 2014, the league was held in the summer, in contrast to previous seasons, which were held in the winter. During this period, the league was restricted to players under the age of 20, making it a national women's youth league. The restrictions were lifted in 2015, and since then, the league has been an unrestricted women's league.

New Zealand Football looked to move the National Women's League to a club-based competition (similar to the men's competition) by 2020. The governing body also hoped to expand the number of games each federation plays in 2018.

== Participants ==
=== Current ===
- 4 teams from the Northern Regional League:
  - Auckland United
  - Eastern Suburbs
  - Ellerslie
  - Western Springs
- Central Football (as "Central Soccer" until 2007) (2002–2007, 2010–)
- Capital Football (as "Capital Soccer" until 2006) (2002–)
- Canterbury United Pride (as "Mainland Soccer" (2002–2005), "Mainland Pride" (2006–2007, 2010–), and "Mainland Football" (2009)) (2002–)
- Southern United (as "Soccersouth" until 2007) (2002–)
- Wellington Phoenix Reserves

=== Former ===
- Auckland Under-20 Development (2010–2011)
- Auckland Football (2002–2020)
- New Zealand Football Development (2005–2006, 2009, 2014–2016

This comprised the national under-19 team (2005), national under-18 team (2006, 2014–2016), and national under-17 team (2009). Although New Zealand Development competed from 2005, they were ineligible to take part in the semifinals and final until the 2009 season.

- Northern Lights (as "North Harbour" until 2007 and then Northern Football until 2010) (2002–2007, 2010–2020)
- Northern Region Development (2011–2013)
- WaiBOP United (2002–2020)
- Young Ferns (2013–2014)

== List of champions ==
A list of National League champion teams:

Year	Champion (Note: Number of titles in brackets)	Runner up	Score	Venue
2002	Auckland (1)	Mainland Soccer	Season decided on league standings	
2003	Auckland (2)	Capital Soccer	Season decided on league standings	
2004	Capital Soccer (1)	Auckland*	2–1	Unknown
2005	Auckland (3)	Capital Soccer*	4–2	Newtown Park, Wellington
2006	Auckland* (4)	Capital Soccer	3–1	Mount Smart Stadium, Auckland
2007	Auckland* (5)	Capital Football (Note: Changed name from Capital Soccer to Capital Football)	3–1	Newtown Park, Wellington
2008	No competition			
2009	Auckland* (6)	Capital Football	5–1	Bayer Growers Stadium, Pukekohe
2010–11	Capital Football* (2)	Waikato-Bay of Plenty	2–1	Memorial Park, Lower Hutt
2011–12	Northern Football* (1)	Waikato-Bay of Plenty	3–0	Parrs Park, Auckland
2012–13	Northern Football* (2)	Auckland Football (Note: Had changed their name the season before with the introduction of Northern Football)	2–0	Fred Taylor Park, Auckland
2013	Mainland Pride (1) (Note: Changed name from Mainland Soccer to Mainland Pride)	Northern Football*	4–2	North Harbour Stadium, North Shore
2014	Mainland Pride* (2)	New Zealand U-18 Development	3–1	ASB Football Park, Christchurch
2015	Northern Football	Mainland Pride*	4–3	ASB Football Park, Christchurch
2016	Canterbury United Pride* (3) (Note: Changed name from Mainland Pride to Canterbury United Pride)	Capital Football	2–0	English Park, Christchurch
2017	Auckland Football (7)	Canterbury United Pride*	3–2	English Park, Christchurch
2018	Canterbury United Pride* (4)	Northern Lights (Note: Changed name from Northern Football to Northern Lights)	3–2	English Park, Christchurch
2019	Canterbury United Pride* (5)	Northern Lights	1–1 (4–3 pen.)	English Park, Christchurch
2020	Canterbury United Pride* (6)	Capital Football	4–0	English Park, Christchurch
2021	National League season cancelled due to COVID-19 pandemic; South Central Series won by Southern United			
2022	Eastern Suburbs	Western Springs	4–0	Mount Smart Stadium, Auckland
2023	Auckland United	Southern United	2–0	Mount Smart Stadium, Auckland
2024	Auckland United (2)	CF Waterside Karori	3–1	North Harbour Stadium, North Shore
2025	Auckland United (3)	Eastern Suburbs	1–0	Keith Hay Park, Mount Roskill

*Home team for final

== Sponsorship ==
On 31 January 2025, New Zealand Football agreed a multi-year sponsorship deal with cleaning brand Dettol for naming rights of the National League from the start of the 2025 season.

== Media coverage ==
Sky Sport had the broadcasting rights for the first two seasons (including the South Central Series). One game was televised live weekly with the remaining four games free to air on either the Sky Sport Next or New Zealand Football YouTube channels.

In September 2023, New Zealand signed a deal to have all National League games streamed for free on FIFA+ worldwide.

== See also ==
- New Zealand Football Championship
