= 2009–10 New Zealand Football Championship =

New Zealand Football Championship
- Season: 2009–10
- Matches: 37
- Goals: 106 (2.86 per match)
- Top goalscorer: Seule Soromon (9)
- Biggest home win: Canterbury 6–0 Manawatu
- Biggest away win: Wellington 0–4 Manawatu
- Highest scoring: Canterbury 6–0 Manawatu

The NZFC 2009–10 season is the sixth season of the New Zealand Football Championship competition.

The previous season's champion, Auckland City FC, and premier Waitakere United will also be competing in the 2009–10 O-League which will run alongside the NZFC season.

== Changes for 2009/10 ==
- Otago United will return to Carisbrook after using Sunnyvale Park as their home ground during the previous season.
- Waitakere United will now play their home fixtures at Fred Taylor Park.

== Team locations ==
Location of teams in the 2009-10 New Zealand Football Championship

== Participating clubs ==
Club Name	Home City	Stadium	2008-09 Placing	2008-09 Notes
Auckland City FC	Auckland	Kiwitea Street	2nd	2008-09 NZFC Champion; Qualified for O-League 2009-10
Canterbury United	Christchurch	English Park	8th	2008-09 NZFC Wooden Spoon
Hawke's Bay United	Napier	Bluewater Stadium	5th	
Otago United	Dunedin	Carisbrook	7th	
Team Wellington	Wellington	Newtown Park	4th	
Waikato FC	Ngaruawahia	Centennial Park	6th	
Waitakere United	Waitakere City	Fred Taylor Park	1st	2008-09 Premier; Qualified for O-League 2009-10
YoungHeart Manawatu	Palmerston North	Memorial Park	3rd	

Canterbury United had initially announced in mid June they would not be competing. However they revoked their decision within two weeks and re-entered the competition. There was also hope from some parties to have a youth/reserve team for Wellington Phoenix FC to participate in the competition. However, the FIFA rules and regulations preventing a professional Australian team from competing in a New Zealand amateur competition meant this was not feasible.

The NZF has looked at including alternative teams in case any of the current eight franchises pull out. In September 2009, a syndicate from North Shore and another from Manukau were approached and asked if they could step in at late notice if one of the eight franchises withdrew.

This season is the final one in the five-year licences for each franchise and NZF are undertaking a major review of their competition structures, including the national league. Significant changes like reverting to a winter league and a club competition complete with promotion/relegation are being considered.

== League table ==
Pos	Team	Pld	W	D	L	GF	GA	GD	Pts	Qualification
1	Auckland City	14	9	4	1	33	13	+20	31	Qualified for the 2010–11 OFC Champions League
2	Waitakere United (C)	14	9	2	3	31	22	+9	29	Qualified for the 2010–11 OFC Champions League
3	Team Wellington	14	7	0	7	22	24	−2	21	2010 New Zealand Football Championship Finals
4	Canterbury United	14	5	3	6	23	16	+7	18	2010 New Zealand Football Championship Finals
5	Otago United	14	5	3	6	16	22	−6	18	
6	YoungHeart Manawatu	14	4	4	6	19	24	−5	16	
7	Hawke's Bay United	14	4	3	7	18	27	−9	15	
8	Waikato FC	14	3	1	10	19	33	−14	10	

(C) Champions

== Competition schedule ==
The competition fixtures were announced on 21 September 2009

=== Round 1 ===
Home	Score	Away	Match Information
Home	Score	Away	Date	Venue	Reports
Otago United	0–0	Auckland City FC	1 November 2009	Carisbrook	(Report)
Team Wellington	0–4	YoungHeart Manawatu	1 November 2009	Newtown Park	(Report)
Waikato FC	4–2	Hawke's Bay United	1 November 2009	Centennial Park	(Report)
Waitakere United	1–0	Canterbury United	1 November 2009	Fred Taylor Park	(Report)

=== Round 2 ===
Home	Score	Away	Match Information
Home	Score	Away	Date	Venue	Reports
Hawke's Bay United	2–1	Otago United	8 November 2009	Bluewater Stadium	(Report)
Canterbury United	2–0	Waikato FC	8 November 2009	English Park	(Report)
Team Wellington	0–1	Auckland City FC	14 November 2009	Newtown Park	(Report)
YoungHeart Manawatu	0–1	Waitakere United	14 November 2009	Memorial Park	(Report)

=== Round 3 ===
Home	Score	Away	Match Information
Home	Score	Away	Date	Venue	Reports
Auckland City FC	2–1	Waitakere United	22 November 2009	Kiwitea Street	(Report)
Canterbury United	1–1	Hawke's Bay United	22 November 2009	English Park	(Report)
Team Wellington	0–2	Otago United	22 November 2009	Newtown Park	(Report)
Waikato FC	1–2	YoungHeart Manawatu	22 November 2009	Centennial Park	(Report)

=== Round 4 ===
Home	Score	Away	Match Information
Home	Score	Away	Date	Venue	Reports
YoungHeart Manawatu	0–0	Canterbury United	6 December 2009	Memorial Park	(Report)
Hawke's Bay United	0–2	Team Wellington	6 December 2009	Bluewater Stadium	(Report)
Otago United	1–2	Waitakere United	6 December 2009	Carisbrook	(Report)
Auckland City FC	5–0	Waikato FC	25 October 2009 (Note: Match postponed due to 2009 FIFA Club World Cup)	Kiwitea Street	(Report)

=== Round 5 ===
Home	Score	Away	Match Information
Home	Score	Away	Date	Venue	Reports
Waikato FC	0–1	Otago United	13 December 2009	Centennial Park	(Report)
Waitakere United	2–1	Team Wellington	13 December 2009	Fred Taylor Park	(Report)
YoungHeart Manawatu	1–0	Hawke's Bay United	13 December 2009	Memorial Park	(Report)
Canterbury United	1–3	Auckland City FC	21 March 2010	English Park	(Report)

=== Round 6 ===
Home	Score	Away	Match Information
Home	Score	Away	Date	Venue	Reports
Auckland City FC	1–4	YoungHeart Manawatu	2 April 2010	Kiwitea Street	(Report)
Hawke's Bay United	2–2	Waitakere United	20 December 2009	Bluewater Stadium	(Report)
Otago United	1–3	Canterbury United	20 December 2009	Carisbrook	(Report)
Team Wellington	2–1	Waikato FC	20 December 2009	Newtown Park	(Report)

=== Round 7 ===
Home	Score	Away	Match Information
Home	Score	Away	Date	Venue	Reports
YoungHeart Manawatu	0–3	Otago United	9 January 2010	Memorial Park	(Report)
Auckland City FC	2–1	Hawke's Bay United	10 January 2010	Kiwitea Street	(Report)
Canterbury United	1–4	Team Wellington	10 January 2010	English Park	(Report)
Waikato FC	2–3	Waitakere United	10 January 2010	Centennial Park	(Report)

=== Round 8 ===
Home	Score	Away	Match Information
Home	Score	Away	Date	Venue	Reports
Auckland City FC	5–0	Otago United	17 January 2010	Kiwitea Street	(Report)
Canterbury United	4–0	Waitakere United	17 January 2010	English Park	(Report)
Hawke's Bay United	3–0	Waikato FC	17 January 2010	Bluewater Stadium	(Report)
YoungHeart Manawatu	0–2	Team Wellington	17 January 2010	Memorial Park	(Report)

=== Round 9 ===
Home	Score	Away	Match Information
Home	Score	Away	Date	Venue	Reports
Waitakere United	3–2	YoungHeart Manawatu	23 January 2010	Fred Taylor Park	(Report)
Otago United	1–0	Hawke's Bay United	23 January 2010	Carisbrook	(Report)
Waikato FC	1–0	Canterbury United	24 January 2010	Centennial Park	(Report)
Auckland City FC	3–1	Team Wellington	24 January 2010	Kiwitea Street	(Report)

=== Round 10 ===
Home	Score	Away	Match Information
Home	Score	Away	Date	Venue	Reports
Waitakere United	1–1	Auckland City FC	30 January 2010	Fred Taylor Park	(Report)
Hawke's Bay United	2–1	Canterbury United	6 March 2010 (Note: Match postponed from 31 January 2010 due to pitch condition)	Bluewater Stadium	(Report)
Otago United	3–1	Team Wellington	31 January 2010	Carisbrook	(Report)
YoungHeart Manawatu	2–3	Waikato FC	31 January 2010	Memorial Park	(Report)

=== Round 11 ===
Home	Score	Away	Match Information
Home	Score	Away	Date	Venue	Reports
Canterbury United	6–0	YoungHeart Manawatu	7 February 2010	English Park	(Report)
Team Wellington	0–1	Hawke's Bay United	7 February 2010	Newtown Park	(Report)
Waikato FC	1–2	Auckland City FC	7 February 2010	Centennial Park	(Report)
Waitakere United	4–0	Otago United	7 February 2010	Fred Taylor Park	(Report)

=== Round 12 ===
Home	Score	Away	Match Information
Home	Score	Away	Date	Venue	Reports
Team Wellington	4–3	Waitakere United	14 February 2010	Newtown Park	(Report)
Otago United	2–2	Waikato FC	21 February 2010	Carisbrook	(Report)
Auckland City FC	1–1	Canterbury United	21 February 2010	Kiwitea Street	(Report)
Hawke's Bay United	2–2	YoungHeart Manawatu	21 February 2010	Bluewater Stadium	(Report)

=== Round 13 ===
Home	Score	Away	Match Information
Home	Score	Away	Date	Venue	Reports
Waikato FC	2–3	Team Wellington	28 February 2010	Centennial Park	(Report)
Canterbury United	2–0	Otago United	28 February 2010	English Park	(Report)
Waitakere United	4–1	Hawke's Bay United	28 February 2010	Fred Taylor Park	(Report)
YoungHeart Manawatu	1–1	Auckland City FC	28 February 2010	Memorial Park	(Report)

=== Round 14 ===
Home	Score	Away	Match Information
Home	Score	Away	Date	Venue	Reports
Otago United	1–1	YoungHeart Manawatu	13 March 2010	Carisbrook	(Report)
Hawke's Bay United	1–6	Auckland City FC	14 March 2010	Bluewater Stadium	(Report)
Team Wellington	2–1	Canterbury United	14 March 2010	Porirua Park	(Report)
Waitakere United	4–2	Waikato FC	14 March 2010	Fred Taylor Park	(Report)

== Finals ==
=== Semi-Finals - First leg ===
Home	Score	Away	Match Information
Home	Score	Away	Date	Venue	Reports
Canterbury United	1–2	Auckland City FC	4 April 2010	English Park	(Report)
Team Wellington	3–2	Waitakere United	4 April 2010	Newtown Park	(Report)

=== Semi-Finals - Second leg ===
Home	Score	Away	Match Information
Home	Score	Away	Date	Venue	Reports
Waitakere United	2–1	Team Wellington	10 April 2010	Fred Taylor Park	(Report)
Auckland City FC	0–3	Canterbury United	11 April 2010	Kiwitea Street	(Report)

=== Grand Final ===
Home	Score	Away	Match Information
Home	Score	Away	Date	Venue	Reports
Waitakere United	3–1	Canterbury United	24 April 2010	Fred Taylor Park	(Report)
