= Canterbury United Pride =

New Zealand football club

Canterbury United
- Full name: Canterbury United Pride
- Founded: 2002
- Dissolved: 22 November 2026; 1 day's time
- Ground: English Park
- Capacity: 3,000
- Manager: Courtney Napa
- League: National Women's League
- Website: https://www.mff.nz/canterbury-utd-pride/canterbury-united

Canterbury United Pride is a semi-professional women's association football team based in Christchurch, New Zealand. The team was established in 2002 as Mainland Pride by Mainland Football as the regional federation's representative in the National Women's League. As such, the teams plays matches at English Park, a 3,000 capacity venue and the headquarters of Mainland Football.

Mainland Pride's first achievement was in their 2011–12 season, with the team finishing first in the National Women's League Southern Conference. However, they didn't manage to advance past the semi-finals of the play-offs, after a 1–6 defeat to Waikato-Bay of Plenty. The team secured their first title in 2013 after defeating Northern Football Federation 4–2 in the final of the National Women's League. In 2014 Pride finished the regular season in first position and were again crowned champions after winning the National Women's League final 3–1 against New Zealand Football Development.

In the 2016 season of the National Women's League, Canterbury United Pride changed their name from Mainland Pride.

Canterbury United Pride are the second most successful team in the history of the New Zealand Women's National League, with their six title haul only one behind Auckland Football.

The team's participation in the 2026 Women's National League will be its' last, after New Zealand Football announced the move to a fully club-based competition from 2027 onwards.

== Season by season record ==
2002-2026 Women's National League

Season	Women's National League									Finals
Season	P	W	D	L	F	A	GD	Pts	Pos	Finals
2002	7	6	1	0	20	3	+17	19	2nd	No finals played
2003	6	2	0	4	21	12	+9	6	5th	No finals played
2004	6	2	1	3	13	13	+0	7	4th	Did not qualify
2005	6	1	2	3	10	12	-2	5	5th	Did not qualify
2006	7	1	1	5	9	13	-4	4	6th	Did not qualify
2007	6	2	1	3	8	10	-2	7	4th	Did not qualify
2009	4	2	1	1	9	5	+4	7	3rd	Semifinals
2010-11	6	1	3	2	9	12	-3	6	5th	Did not qualify
2011-12	6	5	0	1	17	5	+12	15	2nd	Semifinals
2012-13	6	5	1	0	18	5	+13	16	2nd	Semifinals
2013	7	4	2	1	18	7	+14	14	3rd	Winner
2014	7	6	0	1	24	4	+20	18	1st	Winner
2015	7	6	1	0	20	7	+13	19	1st	Runner up
2016	6	4	1	1	20	9	+11	13	1st	Winner
2017	6	4	1	1	14	8	+6	13	1st	Runner up
2018	12	9	0	3	41	14	+27	27	2nd	Winner
2019	12	10	1	1	36	8	+28	31	1st	Winner
2020	6	6	0	0	23	3	+20	18	1st	Winner
2021	6	3	0	3	18	12	+6	9	3rd	No finals played
2022	12	6	0	6	30	30	+0	18	4th	Did not qualify
2023	9	2	1	6	17	22	-5	7	7th	Did not qualify
2024	9	4	1	4	17	20	-3	13	7th	Did not qualify
2025	9	3	1	5	17	32	-15	10	8th	Did not qualify

== Honours ==
- National Women's League

Champions (6): 2013, 2014, 2016, 2018, 2019, 2020

== Notable former players ==
- Aimee Phillips
- Alyssa Whinham
- Amelia Abbott
- Annalie Longo
- Gabi Rennie
- Kate Taylor
- Lara Wall
- Lily Alfeld
- Mackenzie Barry
- Marisa van der Meer
- Meikayla Moore
- Rebecca Lake
- Victoria Esson
