= Nelson Falcons =

- Full name: Nelson Falcons
- Nickname(s): Falcons
- Founded: 2012
- Dissolved: 2015
- Ground: Trafalgar Park, Nelson
- Chairman: Aldo Miccio
- Coach: Mark Johnston
- League: National Youth League
- 2015: 7th

Nelson Falcons was a New Zealand association football club, based in the South Island city of Nelson, New Zealand. Their home ground was Trafalgar Park.

Formed in 2012, Nelson Falcons was the youth football team for the Tasman area, and played its first season in the National Youth League in 2013, with their first game being a 2–2 draw against Canterbury United in which Omar Guardiola scored their first ever goal. After losing the final of the NYL against Auckland City in the 2013–14 season, the team won the NYL title in the 2014–15 season, beating Team Wellington 5–1 on the final day and watching Waitakere United slump to a draw against Auckland City. They disbanded after the 2015 season, when they were replaced in the youth league by Tasman United.
