= 1985 New Zealand National Soccer League =

Season of football

The 1985 New Zealand National Soccer League was the 16th season of a nationwide round-robin club competition in New Zealand football. Wellington Diamond United finished as champions, three points clear of 1984 title-holders Gisborne City.

== Promotion and relegation ==
Auckland University finished last in the 1984 league, and took part in a play-off with the winners of the northern, central, and southern leagues (Hamilton, Stop Out, and Rangers respectively). Auckland University were victorious, becoming the first relegated side to instantly regain their place. The 1985 league was thus the first one to contain an identical starting line-up to the previous season's competition.

== Team performance ==
Though the starting line-up for the 1985 league was identical to the previous season, the finishing positions were considerably different. Wellington Diamond United, playing under that name for the final time, climbed from the previous season's mid-table position to finish top. It started the season poorly, but had an excellent run of results near the end of the season to climb into the leading position. The team was the most youthful to win the title to this point, with an average age of just 23. They edged out playing-through champions Gisborne City who were leading at the half-way stage but saw that followed by a slump featuring three home losses. Hanimex North Shore United greatly improved on their 1984 form to finish third, having taken over the lead from Gisborne but being unable to hold on to it as the season drew to a close. Mount Wellington also improved on the previous season's efforts, but were draw-prone at home costing them a higher finishing position.

Miramar Rangers continued to be entrenched in the middle of the table, its fifth placing being the fifth time in a row that it had not finished in the top or bottom four. Their position was the result of a late season rally after a 10-game winless run had left them close to the bottom of the table. Sixth-placed Nelson United's season was rescued by its mid-season form. It had a poor start and end to the season, but between these won nine of eleven games. Nelson were followed by Auckland University. The previous season's bottom-placed side boasted a radically changed squad, with only three members playing in both seasons, and the team showed a steady, if not brilliant, improvement. Dunedin City rounded out the top eight with an inconsistent season. Towards the end of the come=petition they were in the top four, but they only won one of their last five games and slipped back down the table.

A dramatic mid-season slump saw Christchurch United slip to an unlikely ninth place. An inability to find goals was compensated for by a sturdy defence, but that alone was not enough to see the team into the top half of the table. Below them came 1983 champions Manurewa, who suffered a crippling start to the season with just one win from its first eight matches, and never recovered. Papatoetoe's fall from grace was still more noteworthy. Two top three finishes in 1983 and 1984 were followed by an eleventh place showing in 1985. The team was unlucky, suffering a series of narrow losses, and actually scored more goals than in either of the previous two seasons, finishing with a goal difference of just -1. Last place went to Napier City Rovers, who remained rooted to the bottom of the table with a poor first half to the season. Even a late rally didn't save the club, though its position belied its abilities. It managed to achieve the unusual double of relegation from the national league and a win in the Chatham Cup in the same season.

== League table ==
Pos	Team	Pld	W	D	L	GF	GA	GD	Pts
1	Wellington United (C)	22	12	5	5	50	33	+17	41
2	Gisborne City	22	11	5	6	41	26	+15	38
3	North Shore United	22	11	4	7	47	33	+14	37
4	Mount Wellington	22	8	8	6	40	30	+10	32
5	Miramar Rangers	22	8	6	8	35	33	+2	30
6	Nelson United	22	9	3	10	35	46	−11	30
7	Auckland University	22	9	3	10	30	45	−15	30
8	Dunedin City	22	8	5	9	34	38	−4	29
9	Christchurch United	22	8	4	10	24	25	−1	28
10	Manurewa	22	7	6	9	30	49	−19	27
11	Papatoetoe	22	8	2	12	36	37	−1	26
12	Napier City Rovers (R)	22	5	5	12	36	43	−7	20

Rules for classification: 1) points; 2) goal difference; 3) number of goals scored.
(C) Champions; (R) Relegated

== Sources ==
- Hilton, T. (1991) An association with soccer. Auckland: The New Zealand Football Association. ISBN 0-473-01291-X.
