= 1976 New Zealand National Soccer League =

The 1976 New Zealand National Soccer League was the seventh season of a nationwide round-robin club competition in New Zealand football.

== Promotion and relegation ==
Wellington City (soccer) finished last in the 1975 league and so contested a round-robin home and away play-off series with the winners of the northern, central, and southern leagues (Manurewa, Wellington Diamond United, and Christchurch Rangers respectively). The series was primarily a clash of the two Wellington teams, with Rangers and Manurewa only managing one win each. W.D.U. proved to be too strong for the rest of the teams, remaining undefeated through the series to return to the league after a one-year gap.

== Team performance ==
For the first time the league was won by the team promoted from the regions. It was also the first time that the league title went to a team from outside the two powerhouse cities of Auckland and Christchurch. Wellington Diamond United had an unconventional season in claiming the title — their away record boasted eight wins and just one loss, but the goal tally from these games was 16 for and 13 against. Mount Wellington, usually one of the league's strongest teams, had a dreadful start with no wins in their first five games, but an unbeaten streak in the later part of the season saw them rise to second. Caversham were pacesetters for much of the season, but faded badly from a seemingly unbeatable position with only one win in their last eight games. Despite this, Cavvy recorded the best final standing up until that time for any Dunedin side by finishing third. New Brighton bounced back from their 1975 relegation scare to secure fourth, mainly on the basis of a greatly improved away record.

Blockhouse Bay and Eastern Suburbs comfortably filled the table's middle two spots, but seventh-placed North Shore United's season was far less comfortable. A questionable change of coach proved costly as the 1975 runners-up found themselves close to the relegation zone mid-season, but recovered to finish close to the middle of the table. Christchurch United's new sponsorship deal meant a change of name to Trans Tours Christchurch United, but this change was accompanied by a change in fortune in the club's results. The club failed to finish in the top three for the first time, slumping to eighth — though safely above the relegation zone. Stop Out had a difficult season, despite the arrival of promising new players such as Grant Turner. It was only in the season's last round of matches that they were assured of league survival. It was the East Coast North Island side Gisborne City which claimed the unenviable position of tenth; the side never recovered from an eight-game run of defeats and spent most of the season propping up the foot of the table.

== League table ==
Pos	Team	Pld	W	D	L	GF	GA	GR	Pts
1	Wellington United (C)	18	13	1	4	31	29	1.069	27
2	Mount Wellington	18	10	3	5	33	17	1.941	23
3	Caversham	18	8	6	4	40	26	1.538	22
4	New Brighton	18	10	1	7	31	27	1.148	21
5	Bay Olympic	18	6	5	7	24	22	1.091	17
6	Eastern Suburbs	18	6	5	7	31	32	0.969	17
7	North Shore United	18	6	4	8	28	29	0.966	16
8	Christchurch United	18	7	2	9	21	23	0.913	16
9	Stop Out	18	4	4	10	25	41	0.610	12
10	Gisborne City (R)	18	3	3	12	21	39	0.538	9

Rules for classification: 1) points; 2) goal ratio.
(C) Champions; (R) Relegated

== Records and statistics ==
Top Scorer

- Michael Glubb (New Brighton): 11 goals

== Sources ==
- Hilton, T. (1991) An association with soccer. Auckland: The New Zealand Football Association. ISBN 0-473-01291-X.
