= Gabi Rennie =

New Zealand footballer

Personal information
- Full name: Gabrielle Rose Rennie
- Date of birth: 7 July 2001 (age 25)
- Place of birth: Christchurch, New Zealand
- Height: 1.68 m (5 ft 6 in)
- Position: Forward

Team information
- Current team: Eskilstuna United
- Number: 7

Youth career
- 2006–2018: Waimakariri United

College career
Years	Team	Apps	(Gls)
2020–2021	Indiana Hoosiers	21	(1)
2022–2023	Arizona State Sun Devils	28	(3)

Senior career*
Years	Team	Apps	(Gls)
2018–2020	Canterbury United Pride		(20)
2024	Åland United	20	(6)
2025–	Eskilstuna United	45	(8)

International career^{‡}
2018	New Zealand U17	6	(0)
2018	New Zealand U20	7	(3)
2021–	New Zealand	47	(2)
Medal record
Women's football
Representing New Zealand
OFC U-19 Women's Championship
Winner	2019 Cook Islands
FIFA U-17 Women's World Cup
Third place	2018 Uruguay
OFC U-16 Women's Championship
Winner	2017 Samoa
- * Club domestic league appearances and goals as of 1 October 2026. ‡ National team caps and goals as of 23 May 2026.

Gabrielle Rose Rennie (born 7 July 2001) is a New Zealand footballer who plays as a forward for Eskilstuna United and the New Zealand women's national team. She was part of the New Zealand team in the football competition at the 2020 Summer Olympics. She scored her first international goal on her debut, against Australia at the Olympics in a 2–1 loss.

== Early life ==
Rennie played in her youth with Waimakariri United. She attended Rangiora High School, where she was a Deputy Head Girl. She started schooling for exercise and science degree at Indiana University Bloomington prior to transferring to Arizona State University.

== College career ==
Rennie signed with Indiana University to play for the Indiana Hoosiers for the 2020 season. Rennie scored her first collegiate goal in a 2–1 win over Michigan State. After two seasons at Indiana, where she scored one goal in 21 games, Rennie transferred to Arizona State ahead of the 2022 season.

== Club career ==
Rennie played for Canterbury United Pride in the New Zealand Women's National League, winning the competition in 2018 scoring 6 goals, 2019 scoring 7 goals and 2020 as top goal scorer with 7 goals.

In February 2024, Rennie joined Finnish club Åland United.

Following her departure from Finnish club Åland United Rennie joined Swedish club Eskilstuna United on a 1-year deal. During a game on the 15th of June 2025 Rennie notched up 4 assists in a 4–0 win for Eskilstuna United.

== International career ==
Rennie was part of the New Zealand U-17 team who created history by winning New Zealand's first medal at a FIFA World Cup, when they came 3rd at the 2018 FIFA U-17 Women's World Cup in Uruguay.

On 25 June 2021, Rennie was called up to the New Zealand squad for the delayed 2020 Summer Olympics.

Rennie was called up to the New Zealand squad for the 2023 FIFA Women's World Cup.

On 4 July 2024, Rennie was called up to the New Zealand squad for the 2024 Summer Olympics.

== Career statistics ==
=== International ===
Scores and results list New Zealand's goal tally first, score column indicates score after each Rennie goal.

List of international goals scored by Gabi Rennie
No.	Date	Venue	Opponent	Score	Result	Competition	Ref.
1	21 July 2021	Tokyo Stadium, Tokyo, Japan	Australia	1–2	1–2	2020 Summer Olympics	
2	30 November 2021	Goyang Stadium, Goyang, South Korea	South Korea	2–0	2–0	Friendly	

== Honours ==
New Zealand U17

- FIFA U-17 Women's World Cup: 3rd Place, 2018
- OFC U-16 Women's Championship: Winners, 2017

New Zealand U20

- OFC U-19 Women's Championship: Winners, 2019

Canterbury United Pride

- National Women's League: 2018, 2019, 2020

Individual

- National Women's League top-goalscorer: 2020
