= Jacqui Hand =

New Zealand association football player

Personal information
- Full name: Jacqueline Anne Hand
- Date of birth: 19 February 1999 (age 27)
- Place of birth: Auckland, New Zealand
- Height: 1.69 m (5 ft 7 in)
- Position: Forward

Team information
- Current team: Basel

Youth career
- –2017: Mount Albert Grammar School

College career
Years	Team	Apps	(Gls)
2018–2021	Colorado College Tigers	55	(18)

Senior career*
Years	Team	Apps	(Gls)
–2017	Eastern Suburbs		
2022–2023	Åland United	32	(14)
2024	Lewes	10	(1)
2024–2025	Sheffield United	16	(2)
2025-2026	Kolbotn IL	12	(3)
2026–	Basel	19	(2)

International career^{‡}
2021–	New Zealand	39	(9)
- * Club domestic league appearances and goals as of 1 November 2026. ‡ National team caps and goals as of 23 May 2026.

Jacqueline Anne Hand (born 19 February 1999) is a New Zealand professional footballer who plays as a forward for Basel and the New Zealand national team.

== College career ==
Hand played for the Colorado College Tigers in the United States.

== Club career ==
On 28 September 2024, Hand was announced at Sheffield United.

== International career ==
Hand made her international debut for New Zealand in their 1–5 loss to Canada in October 2021. She scored her first goal in November 2021 in a friendly match against South Korea, which they lost 2–1.

Hand was selected as part of New Zealand's squad for the 2023 FIFA Women's World Cup, co-hosted in Australia and New Zealand. She provided the assist for Hannah Wilkinson's goal in the Ferns' 1–0 victory in the opening match against Norway, in what would be their first ever win at the World Cup finals.

Hand was called up to the New Zealand squad for the 2024 Summer Olympics.

== International goals ==
Scores and results list New Zealand's goal tally first.

No.	Date	Venue	Opponent	Score	Result	Competition
1.	27 November 2021	Goyang Stadium, Goyang, South Korea	South Korea	1–0	1–2	Friendly
2.	10 July 2023	McLean Park, Napier, New Zealand	Vietnam	2–0	2–0	Friendly
3.	10 February 2024	FFS Football Stadium, Apia, Samoa	Samoa	1–0	6–0	2024 OFC Women's Olympic Qualifying Tournament
4.	13 February 2024	FFS Football Stadium, Apia, Samoa	Vanuatu	1–0	5–0	2024 OFC Women's Olympic Qualifying Tournament
5.	16 February 2024	FFS Football Stadium, Apia, Samoa	Fiji	2–0	7–1	2024 OFC Women's Olympic Qualifying Tournament
6.	16 February 2024	FFS Football Stadium, Apia, Samoa	Fiji	4–0	7–1	2024 OFC Women's Olympic Qualifying Tournament
7.	19 February 2024	FFS Football Stadium, Apia, Samoa	Solomon Islands	1–0	11–1	2024 OFC Women's Olympic Qualifying Tournament
8.	6 April 2024	Rugby League Park, Christchurch, New Zealand	Thailand	2–0	4–0	Friendly
9.	3 June 2025	Estadio Nuevo Mirador, Algeciras, Spain	Venezuela	2–1	2–1	Friendly
