= Memorial Park, Palmerston North =

Sports venue in Palmerston North, New Zealand

Coordinates: 40.3464°S 175.6346°E

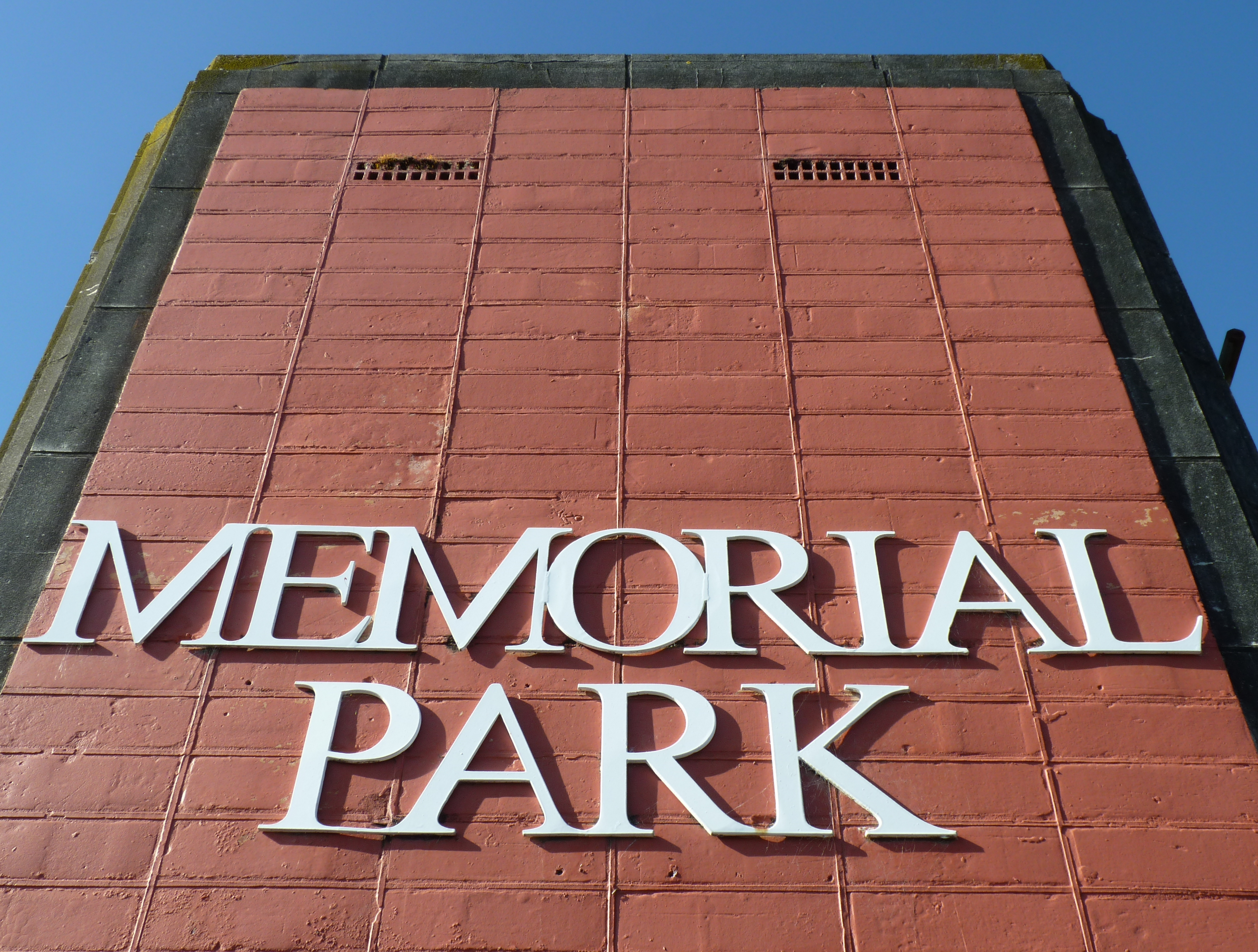
Memorial Park, Palmerston North, New Zealand

Memorial Park is a multi-use stadium in Palmerston North, New Zealand. It is currently used mostly for football matches and was the home stadium of YoungHeart Manawatu before they disbanded. The stadium has a capacity of 8,000 people.

The stadium hosted the final of the 2011 Chatham Cup on 28 August 2011. Wairarapa United won the competition for the first time in their history, defeating Napier City Rovers 2–1. This is the first time that the final of New Zealand's premier knockout football competition has been held in Palmerston North.

In 2015 Central Football board member Bruce McGhie proposed a plan to the Palmerston North City Council on making the ground an all-weather sports field. He stated that by 2019–20 Memorial Park would have a multi-purpose artificial sports field. The plan is set to cost $1.7 million.
