= Maggie Jenkins =

New Zealand footballer (born 2001)

Personal information
- Full name: Margaret Ellen Jenkins
- Date of birth: 14 June 2001 (age 25)
- Place of birth: Wellington, New Zealand
- Height: 1.71 m (5 ft 7 in)
- Position: Striker

Team information
- Current team: Perth Glory
- Number: 9

College career
Years	Team	Apps	(Gls)
2020–2024	UCF Knights	42	(6)

Senior career*
Years	Team	Apps	(Gls)
2015–2018	Wellington United		
2018–2019	Northern Lights	20	(10)
2024–2025	ALG Spor	24	(9)
2025	Wellington United	9	(15)
2026	Auckland United	7	(15)
2026	Essendon Royals	4	(6)
2026–	Perth Glory	5	(1)

International career^{‡}
2016–2018	New Zealand U17	15	(14)
2017–	New Zealand U20	7	(8)
2017–	New Zealand	1	(0)
Medal record
FIFA U-17 Women's World Cup
Bronze medal – third place	2018 Uruguay	Tournament
- * Club domestic league appearances and goals as of 18 November 2025 ‡ National team caps and goals as of 11:00, 13 June 2019 (UTC)

Margaret Ellen Jenkins (born 14 June 2001), also known as Maggie Jenkins, is a New Zealand footballer who plays as a forward for A-League Women club Perth Glory. She has represented New Zealand in football at both age group and international level.

== Club career ==
Jenkins joined Turkish club ALG Spor in July 2024.

After her stint in Turkey, Jenkins returned to New Zealand, joining Wellington United, where she was named the 2025 MVP and won the Golden Boot, scoring 15 goals in 9 games. Following that, she joined Auckland United, where she scored 15 goals in 7 games.

In May 2026, Jenkins moved to Australia, joining NPLW Victoria club Essendon Royals and scored six goals in four games.

In August 2026, Jenkins signed a one-season contract with A-League Women club Perth Glory.

== International career ==
Jenkins was a member of the New Zealand U-17 side at the 2016 FIFA U-17 Women's World Cup in Jordan aged 15, and again at the 2018 FIFA U-17 Women's World Cup in Uruguay, as well as at the 2018 FIFA U-20 Women's World Cup in France. She won a bronze medal making history for New Zealand at 2018 FIFA U-17 Women's World Cup in Uruguay, New Zealand's only medal at a FIFA tournament.

Jenkins made her senior début in a 5–0 win over Thailand on 28 November 2017. Jenkins has been part of multiple Football Ferns tours: in 2021 to Canada and South Korea, in 2022 to Los Angeles, and in 2023 ahead of the FIFA Women’s World Cup in New Zealand and Australia.
