= Michaela Robertson =

New Zealand footballer

Personal information
- Full name: Michaela Ashleigh Robertson
- Date of birth: 28 August 1996 (age 30)
- Place of birth: New Zealand
- Height: 1.50 m (4 ft 11 in)
- Position: Forward

Senior career*
Years	Team	Apps	(Gls)
2013–2020	Wellington United	100+	(100+)
2022–2024	Wellington Phoenix	25	(4)
- * Club domestic league appearances and goals as of 28 May 2024

Michaela Ashleigh Robertson (born 28 August 1996) is a former New Zealand professional footballer who last played as a forward for Wellington Phoenix. She was part of the New Zealand team in the football competition at the 2020 Summer Olympics.
