= Memorial Park, Lower Hutt =

Sports venue in Lower Hutt, New Zealand

Coordinates: 41.2238345°S 174.8943302°E

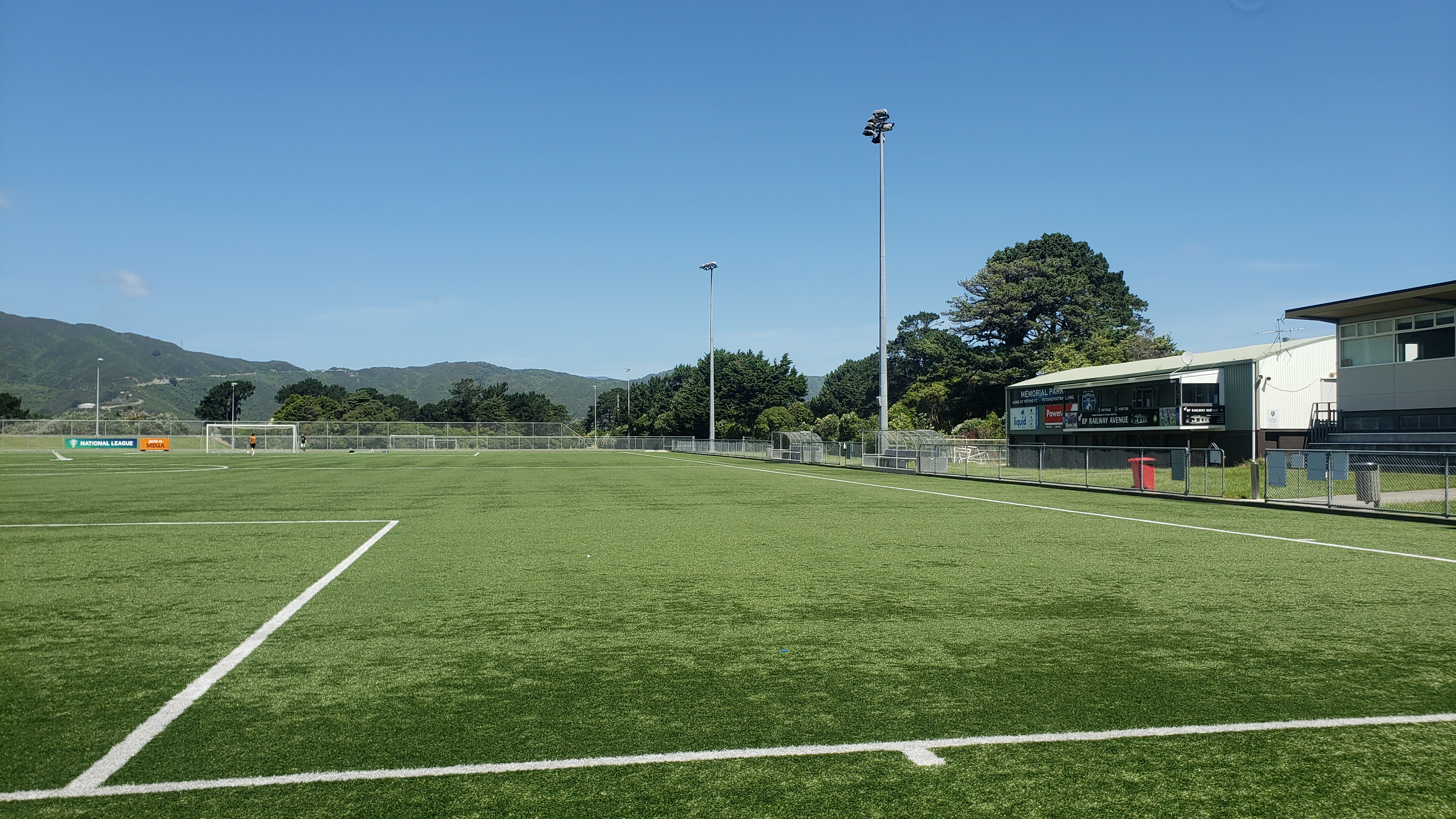
The main playing field at the park, with the club buildings to the right

Memorial Park is a venue for football matches in Lower Hutt, New Zealand. It is the home of Petone FC who have been based there since 1961 as well as Capital Football who look after the game for the Wellington Region.

The ground was also the training base and home ground for the National Women's team Capital Football who play in New Zealand's highest level domestic competition, the National Women's League.

It was the first ground in Wellington to have a fully floodlit training pitch which was established in 1979. In 2012, Capital Football, New Zealand Football and Hutt City Council announced that Memorial Park would get an artificial pitch with the aim of making the ground the 'Home of Football' for the Wellington Region. Work was started on 23 October 2012 and was official opened on 25 May 2013 by Lower Hutt Mayor Ray Wallace, New Zealand Football chairman Frank van Hattum, Capital Football chief executive Richard Reid and Petone Football club chairman Craig Deadman.
