= Capital Football (New Zealand) =

- Founded: 1890
- Headquarters: Home of Football, Memorial Park, Wellington
- FIFA affiliation: New Zealand Football
- Chief Executive: Richard Reid
- Website: capitalfootball.org.nz

Capital Football is one of six federations of New Zealand Football, representing the wider Wellington Region, including Hutt Valley, Wairarapa and Horowhenua-Kāpiti.

== History ==
Capital Football was first formed as Wellington Football Association (WFA) on 12 March 1890. Before the association was formed, teams had already been formed in Wellington, with the Wellington Rovers being the first formed on the 3 April 1889. The first game played under the English Football Association rules was played between two teams of Wellington Rovers players on the 6 April 1889. The first game between two clubs was played later that year on 8 June between the Rovers and the newly formed Petone Wanderers. The game was played at Wellington College with the Wanderers winning 2–0.

Some of the first clubs that were part of the Wellington Football Association are still in existence today including Waterside (1921), Swifts (1894) and Karori (1912) who are now Waterside Karori. United (1892) and Diamond (1893) who are now Wellington United. Porirua United (1904) and Hospital (1907) who are now Western Suburbs. Wellington Marist (1902) and Miramar Rangers (1908) also still play under their original names.

In 1984 the association changed their name to Wellington Soccer Association (WSA). During May 1999 New Zealand Soccer set up the seven Federations when previously there was 23 District Associations, WSA looked after Federation Five and then incorporated and renamed as Capital Soccer on 29 November 2000. When New Zealand Soccer changed their name to New Zealand Football, the federations followed suit and Capital Soccer became Capital Football in 2007.

While New Zealand Football is the governing body, unlike other sports in New Zealand, the funding model for football means each seven regional federations look after football in their area themselves, only following New Zealand Football's plan as they see fit. For the local federations, the clubs fund the federation with the rest of the money coming from Sport New Zealand funding and about three per cent from New Zealand Football.

== Board members ==
As of 2018.

- Paul Houliston (Board Chair)
- Dave Trueman (Deputy Chair)
- Mike Moore
- Helen Mallon
- Jess Fraser
- Chris James
- Mike Hornsby
- Craig Deadman

== Competitions ==
- Central League
- Capital Premier
- Capital Football W-League

Note: Central League can include teams from the Central Federation and is a lower North Island competition managed by Capital Football.

== Affiliated clubs ==
As of 2017.

Hutt Valley Eastbourne AFC Lower Hutt City AFC Naenae SC Petone FC Stokes Valley FC Stop Out Sports Club Upper Hutt City FC Wainuiomata AFC	Kapiti Kapiti Coast United Levin AFC Otaki AFC Paekakariki Sports Club Waikanae AFC Manakau United FC	Wairarapa Carterton AFC Douglas Villa AFC Featherston AFC Greytown FC Masterton AFC Wairarapa United Martinborough AFC	Wellington Brooklyn Northern United Island Bay United AFC Marist AFC Miramar Rangers AFC North Wellington AFC Wellington Olympic AFC Onslow Junior FC Seatoun AFC Victoria University Waterside Karori AFC Wellington United AFC Wellington College	Western Pukerua Bay Soccer Club Tawa AFC Western Suburbs FC

== See also ==
- Association football in New Zealand
- Northern Region Football
- WaiBOP Football
- Central Football
- Mainland Football
- Southern Football
