= Northern Football Federation =

The Northern Football Federation (NFF) was an association football organisation, responsible for local growth and developing the game in West Auckland, North Shore and Northland, New Zealand.

In 2020 it was merged with Auckland Football Federation into the Northern Region Football.

== Representative teams ==
- National Women's League Squad 2015
- NFF National Futsal League Squad 2015

== Football Honors ==
National Women's League	National Age Group Tournament	Weir Rose Bowl
Champions 2011, 2012, 2015, 2018; Runners up 2014	Federation Cup Winners 2016	

== Futsal Honors ==
Futsal National League	Futsal National Women's League	Futsal National Youth Championships
Winners 2012-13	Winners 2015; Runners up 2013	14th Boys Grade Winners 2012; 19th Boys Grade Winners 2016

== Member clubs ==
West Auckland	Rodney	North Shore	Kaipara	Whangarei	Far North
Glen Eden	Norwest United	Albany United	Mangawhai FC	Onerahi	Kaikohe AFC
Oratia United	Puhoi SC	Birkenhead United	Northern Wairoa FC	Madhatters FC	Kerikeri AFC
Te Atatu AFC	Warkworth	East Coast Bays AFC		FC Whangarei	Bay Cosmos
Ranui Swanson		Forrest Hill Milford		Central Brown	Bay Cosmos Karetu
Waitakere City F.C.		Glenfield Rovers		Hora Hora	Kaitaia UTD
Waitemata AFC		Greenhithe Football Club		Marist	Ohaeawai School
West Auckland AFC		Hibiscus Coast AFC		Kamo	Okaihau Primary School
		Kristin		Tikipunga	Paihia
		North Shore United		Bream Bay United	Russell
		Takapuna AFC		Ngunguru	
				Mangakahia	
				Bay Tigers	
				Maunu	
				Parua Bay	
				North Force	
