= Auckland Football Federation =

- Merger of: Northern Region Football
- Region served: Auckland, New Zealand
- Chief Executive Officer: Bob Patterson
- Chief Operations Manager: Steven Upfold
- Affiliations: New Zealand Football
- Website: www.nrf.org.nz

The Auckland Football Federation was an association football organisation, responsible for the local growth and development of the game in Auckland, New Zealand. In 2020 it was merged with Auckland Football Federation into the Northern Region Football.

== Staff ==
- (New Zealand) Bob Patterson — Chief Executive Officer
- (New Zealand) Steven Upfold — Chief Operations Manager
- (New Zealand) Nic Downes — Football Development Officer
- (New Zealand) Carol Waller — Accounts Manager
- (Scotland) Gordon Watson — Communications Manager
- (England) Ben Bates — Football Development Officer
- (New Zealand) Ben Hill — Competitions Administrator
- (New Zealand) Paul Smith — Referee Development Officer
- (New Zealand) Marvin Eakins — Futsal Development Officer
- (Wales) Gemma Lewis — Girls' and Women's Football Development Officer

== Member clubs ==
- Bay Olympic
- Beachlands Maraetai
- Bucklands Beach
- Central United
- Clendon AFC
- Clevedon FC
- Drury United
- Eastern Suburbs
- Fencibles United
- High School Old Boys
- Lynn-Avon United
- Mangere United
- Manukau City
- Manurewa
- Metro FC
- Mt Albert Ponsonby
- Onehunga-Mangere United
- Onehunga Sports
- Otahuhu United AFC
- Papakura City
- Papatoetoe
- Papatoetoe United
- Pukekohe
- South Auckland Rangers
- Three Kings United
- Tuakau SC
- University-Mount Wellington
- Waiheke United
- Waiuku
- Western Springs
