= English Park =

Football stadium in Christchurch, New Zealand

Coordinates: 43.5092°S 172.6362°E

English Park is a football stadium in Christchurch, New Zealand. It is the home stadium of Canterbury United, which competes in the ASB Premiership, as well as Western AFC which currently compete in the Mainland Premier League. The stadium has a capacity of approximately 3,000 people.

English Park was used for cycle racing. For example, races were held in December 1927 and February 1928 to raise funds for Harry Watson so that he could compete in the 1928 Tour de France as part of the Australasian Ravat-Wonder-Dunlop cycling team; Watson was the first New Zealander to compete in the Tour de France. In 1929, English Park was used for motorcycle speedway meetings until a competing organiser in Woolston bought out the interests in that sport.

The venue was intended to host the track cycling for the 1974 British Commonwealth Games before a purpose built Denton Park Velodrome was selected instead.

English Park is the headquarters for Mainland Football, the largest of the seven football federations within New Zealand. From 2010 to 2011 the playing surface was changed from natural grass to FIFA approved artificial turf, new lighting was also installed to enable night matches, and trainings. In 2013 a café stall was installed. The park also features four team changing rooms, one officials changing room, one lounge with a bar, one kitchen, and a number of offices which are occupied by Mainland Football

The park also hosts a number of early season Mainland Premier League games, and during the winter season where grass pitches are unplayable. Currently, most English, and Reta Fitzpatrick Cup games are played during the midweek in the evenings at the ground. The finals for both competitions are played over one day, during early September.
