= 2022 New Zealand Women's National League =

Football Championship

New Zealand National League
- Season: 2022
- Dates: 27 March 2022 – 11 December 2022
- Champions: Eastern Suburbs
- 2023 OFC Women's Champions League: Eastern Suburbs
- Matches: 57
- Goals: 265 (4.65 per match)
- Top goalscorer: Tayla O'Brien (17 goals)
- Biggest home win: Eastern Suburbs 8–0 Central Football (25 September 2022)
- Biggest away win: Central Football 0–9 Northern Rovers (2 October 2022)
- Highest scoring: Auckland United 9–3 Central Football (30 October 2022)
- Longest winning run: 10 matches Eastern Suburbs
- Longest unbeaten run: 10 matches Eastern Suburbs
- Longest winless run: 11 matches Central Football
- Longest losing run: 11 matches Central Football
- All statistics correct as of 20 November 2022.

The 2022 New Zealand Women's National League is the second scheduled season of the new National League since its restructuring in 2021; the 2021 National League was cancelled due to the COVID-19 pandemic in northern regions. The 2022 season will be the twentieth season of national women's football and will be a hybrid season. The competition will feature four teams from the NRFL Premier League representing the Northern Conference, Central Football and Capital Football representing the Central Conference and Canterbury United Pride and Southern United representing the Southern Conference.

== Qualifying league ==
=== 2022 NRFL Premier League ===
After a shortened season in 2021, no teams were relegated and instead 2022 saw the league expand to eight teams with the inclusion of West Coast Rangers and Tauranga City.

==== Teams ====
Team	Location	Home Ground	2021 season
Auckland United	Mount Roskill, Auckland	Keith Hay Park	6th
Eastern Suburbs	Kohimarama, Auckland	Madills Farm	1st
Ellerslie	Ellerslie, Auckland	Michaels Avenue Reserve	5th
Hamilton Wanderers	Chartwell, Hamilton	Porritt Stadium	4th
Northern Rovers	Glenfield, Auckland	McFetridge Park	3rd
Tauranga City	Mount Maunganui, Tauranga	Links Avenue	1st in WaiBOP W-League (promoted)
West Coast Rangers	Whenuapai, Auckland	Fred Taylor Park	1st in NRF Championship (promoted)
Western Springs	Westmere, Auckland	Seddon Fields	2nd

==== NRFL Premier League table ====
Pos	Team	Pld	W	D	L	GF	GA	GD	Pts	Qualification
1	Northern Rovers (C)	21	17	3	1	53	14	+39	54	Winner of Northern League and qualification to National League Championship
2	Western Springs	21	14	1	6	41	25	+16	43	Qualification to National League Championship
3	Eastern Suburbs	21	13	2	6	73	36	+37	41	Qualification to National League Championship
4	Auckland United	21	12	1	8	52	39	+13	37	Qualification to National League Championship
5	Ellerslie	21	8	3	10	42	34	+8	27	
6	West Coast Rangers	21	6	4	11	24	35	−11	22	
7	Hamilton Wanderers	21	5	1	15	26	56	−30	16	
8	Tauranga City (R)	21	1	1	19	13	85	−72	4	Relegation to NRF Championship/WaiBOP W-League

Source: Northern Region Football
Rules for classification: 1) Points; 2) Goal difference; 3) Goals scored; 4) Goals against; 5) Head to head; 6) Disciplinary record; 7) Coin toss
(C) Champions; (R) Relegated
- Western Springs drew 0–0 with Ellerslie on 15 July 2022, but Western Springs fielded an ineligible player. Result overturned to a 3–0 win for Ellerslie.

==== NRFL Premier League results table ====
Home \ Away	AU	ES	EL	HW	NR	TC	WC	WS	AU	ES	EL	HW	NR	TC	WC	WS
Auckland United		3–0	2–2	2–0	2–4	8–1	3–1	0–1				3–0			4–1	2–1
Eastern Suburbs	3–2		4–0	5–0	1–6	11–1	4–1	3–0	6–1				2–3	7–1		
Ellerslie	1–4	0–3		2–0	0–2	6–0	0–2	0–4	6–1	2–3				6–0	3–0	
Hamilton Wanderers	1–4	2–2	0–2		1–2	4–0	3–2	2–3		1–5	2–1					2–4
Northern Rovers	2–1	3–2	1–0	3–0		5–0	1–0	0–0	3–0 (Note: Default by Auckland United.)		2–2	4–0			0–0	2–1
Tauranga City	1–3	3–7	0–3	3–2	0–3		0–0	1–2	1–2			1–4	0–3			
West Coast Rangers	2–5	0–1	1–1	0–1	0–3	1–0		1–0		2–2		5–1		2–0		1–2
Western Springs	3–1	3–1	0–3 (Note: Western Springs drew 0–0 with Ellerslie on 15 July 2022, but Western Springs fielded an ineligible player. Result overturned to a 3–0 win for Ellerslie.)	3–0	2–1	4–0	1–2			2–1	3–2			2–0		

Source: Northern Region Football
Legend: Blue = home team win; Yellow = draw; Red = away team win.

==== NRFL Premier League scoring ====
As of complete

===== NRFL Premier League top scorers =====
Rank	Player	Club	Goals
1	Juliette Lucas	Eastern Suburbs	16
2	Jade Parris	Eastern Suburbs	13
3	Helen Arjomandi	Hamilton Wanderers	12
3	Deven Jackson	Eastern Suburbs	12
3	Tayla O'Brien	Eastern Suburbs	12
6	Michaela Foster	Auckland United	11
7	Britney Cunningham-Lee	Ellerslie	10
7	Sofia Garcia	Western Springs	10
9	Danielle Canham	Northern Rovers	8
9	Rina Hirano	Western Springs	8
9	Bree Johnson	Auckland United	8
9	Martine Puketapu	Auckland United	8

===== NRFL Premier League hat-tricks =====
Round	Player	For	Against	Home/Away	Result	Date
1	Hollie Leona	Ellerslie	Tauranga City	Home	6–0	27 March 2022
6	Jade Parris (Note: Player scored 4 goals)	Eastern Suburbs	Tauranga City	Home	11–1	1 May 2022
6	Juliette Lucas	Eastern Suburbs	Tauranga City	Home	11–1	1 May 2022
7	Rina Hirano	Western Springs	Ellerslie	Away	0–4	8 May 2022
9	Prue Catton	Auckland United	Tauranga City	Home	8–1	22 May 2022
13	Deven Jackson	Eastern Suburbs	Tauranga City	Away	3–7	3 July 2022
14	Martine Puketapu	Auckland United	West Coast Rangers	Away	2–5	15 July 2022
14	Danielle Canham	Northern Rovers	Tauranga City	Home	5–0	17 July 2022
18	Juliette Lucas	Eastern Suburbs	Auckland United	Home	6–1	14 August 2022
20	Britney Cunningham-Lee	Ellerslie	Auckland United	Home	6–1	25 August 2022
21	Juliette Lucas	Eastern Suburbs	Hamilton Wanderers	Away	1–5	4 September 2022

===== Own goals =====
Round	Player	Club	Against
4	Rebekah van Dort	Eastern Suburbs	Auckland United
7	Karly Knight	West Coast Rangers	Auckland United
9	Bailey Payne	Tauranga City	Auckland United
10	Caitlin Byrne	Hamilton Wanderers	Auckland United
12	Erinna Wong	Eastern Suburbs	West Coast Rangers
13	Angelique Tuisamoa	Western Springs	Northern Rovers
15	Alisha Perry	Hamilton Wanderers	Northern Rovers
15	Emma Cawte	Tauranga City	Ellerslie
19	Serena Murrihy	Tauranga City	Hamilton Wanderers
19	Julia Edwards	Tauranga City	Hamilton Wanderers

== Qualified teams ==
Locations of the 2022 National League Teams
Location of clubs in Auckland Region for the 2022 National League season

Association	Team	Position in Regional League	App (last)	Previous best (last)
Northern League (4 berths)	Northern Rovers	1st	1st	Debut
Northern League (4 berths)	Western Springs	2nd	1st	Debut
Northern League (4 berths)	Eastern Suburbs	3rd	1st	Debut
Northern League (4 berths)	Auckland United	4th	1st	Debut
Central League (2 berths)	Central Football	N/A	20th (2021)	2nd (2004)
Central League (2 berths)	Capital Football	N/A	20th (2021)	1st (2010)
Southern League (2 berths)	Canterbury United Pride	N/A	20th (2021)	1st (2020)
Southern League (2 berths)	Southern United	N/A	20th (2021)	1st (2021)

== Championship phase ==
=== League table ===
Pos	Team	Pld	W	D	L	GF	GA	GD	Pts	Qualification
1	Eastern Suburbs (C)	14	12	0	2	55	17	+38	36	Qualification to Grand Final
2	Western Springs	14	9	2	3	47	21	+26	29	Qualification to Grand Final
3	Northern Rovers	14	7	4	3	44	23	+21	25	
4	Canterbury United Pride	14	6	2	6	30	30	0	20	
5	Southern United	14	5	5	4	19	23	−4	20	
6	Auckland United	14	4	2	8	37	42	−5	14	
7	Capital Football	14	3	3	8	17	35	−18	12	
8	Central Football	14	1	0	13	12	70	−58	3	

Source: New Zealand Football
Rules for classification: 1) Points; 2) Goal difference; 3) Goals for; 4) Head to head; 5) Head to head goal difference; 6) Disciplinary record; 7) Coin toss
(C) Champions

=== Results table ===
Home \ Away	AU	CU	CAP	CEN	ES	NR	SU	WS
Auckland United		2–3	3–2	9–3	2–3	1–1	1–4	0–3
Canterbury United Pride	7–2		0–0 (Note: This match was cancelled due to a COVID-19 outbreak in the Canterbury United squad. The match was declared as a 0–0 draw.)	3–0	1–4	1–4	0–0	2–3
Capital Football	4–4	1–2		1–0	1–4	0–4	0–2	3–2
Central Football	1–2	2–3	2–4		1–9	0–9	2–1	1–5
Eastern Suburbs	5–0	1–2	3–0	8–0		4–2	1–0	3–2
Northern Rovers	3–2	6–3	5–0	4–0	2–5		1–1	1–1
Southern United	0–7	2–1	1–1	3–0	2–1	1–1		1–1
Western Springs	3–2	3–2	3–0	9–0	2–4	4–1	6–1	

Source: New Zealand Football
Legend: Blue = home team win; Yellow = draw; Red = away team win.

==== Positions by round ====
The table lists the positions of teams after each week of matches. To preserve chronological evolvements, any postponed matches are not included in the round at which they were originally scheduled, but added to the full round they were played immediately afterwards. For example, if a match is scheduled for round 3, but then postponed and played between rounds 6 and 7, it is added to the standings for round 6.

Team ╲ Round	1	2	3	4	5	6	7	8	9	10	11	12	13	14
Eastern Suburbs	2	1	1	1	1	1	1	1	1	1	1	1	1	1
Western Springs	1	2	2	2	2	2	2	2	2	2	2	2	2	2
Northern Rovers	4	4	3	3	3	3	3	3	3	3	3	3	3	3
Canterbury United Pride	3	5	5	4	4	4	5	5	4	5	4	4	4	4
Southern United	8	8	6	5	5	5	4	4	5	4	5	5	5	5
Auckland United	4	3	4	6	6	6	7	6	6	6	6	7	6	6
Capital Football	6	6	7	7	7	7	6	7	7	7	7	6	7	7
Central Football	7	7	8	8	8	8	8	8	8	8	8	8	8	8

Leader and Grand Final
Grand Final

Source: New Zealand Football

=== Grand Final ===
Sunday, 18 December 2022
14:00 NZDT

Eastern Suburbs	4–0	Western Springs
Tuisamoa 9' (o.g.); Yoshida 42'; Jackson 53', 83'	Report

Mt Smart Stadium, Auckland
Referee: Anna-Marie Keighley

== Statistics ==
=== Top scorers ===
Rank	Player	Club	Goals
1	Tayla O'Brien	Eastern Suburbs	17
2	Deven Jackson	Eastern Suburbs	14
3	Bree Johnson	Auckland United	13
4	Kelli Brown	Northern Rovers	12
5	Sofia Garcia	Western Springs	11
6	Rina Hirano	Western Springs	8
6	Charlotte Roche	Canterbury United Pride	8
8	Jessica Innes	Western Springs	7
9	Manaia Elliott	Auckland United	6
9	Juliette Lucas	Eastern Suburbs	6

=== Hat-tricks ===
As of 25 September 2022

Round	Player	For	Against	Home/Away	Result	Date
1	Tayla O'Brien (Note: Player scored 4 goals)	Eastern Suburbs	Capital Football	Away	1–4	17 September 2022
1	Sofia Garcia	Western Springs	Southern United	Home	6–1	18 September 2022
2	Michaela Foster	Northern Rovers	Capital Football	Home	5–0	24 September 2022
2	Tayla O'Brien	Eastern Suburbs	Central Football	Home	8–0	25 September 2022

=== Own goals ===
As of 25 September 2022

Round	Player	Club	Against
2	Freya Partridge-Moore	Southern United	Auckland United
2	Una Foyle	Canterbury United Pride	Western Springs

== Awards ==
=== Goal of the Week ===
Goal of the Week
Week	Player	Club	Ref.
1			
2	Lara Colpi	Western Springs	
3	Jasmine Prince	Southern United	
4	Kate Guildford	Canterbury United Pride	
5	Pepi Olliver-Bell	Capital Football	
6	Ashley Arquette	Central Football	
7	Arisa Takeda	Western Springs	

=== Team of the Month ===
Team of the Month
Month	Goalkeeper	Defenders	Midfielders	Forwards
October	Una Foyle (CU)	Erina Wong (ES); Jana Niedermayr (CEN); Rebekah Van Dort(ES); Arisa Takeda (WS)	Rina Hirano (WS); Michaela Foster (NR); Rose Morton (SU); Renee Bacon (CAP)	Tayla O'Brien(ES); Bree Johnson (AU)

== See also ==
- 2022 New Zealand National League (men's)
