= Tayla O'Brien =

New Zealand footballer

Personal information
- Full name: Tayla Anne O'Brien
- Date of birth: 6 July 1994 (age 32)
- Place of birth: New Zealand
- Height: 1.71 m (5 ft 7 in)
- Position: Forward

Team information
- Current team: Eastern Suburbs
- Number: 8

Senior career*
Years	Team	Apps	(Gls)
2010–2016	Northern Football		
2017–2020	Auckland Football		
2016–	Eastern Suburbs	?	(90)

International career^{‡}
2013–2014	New Zealand U20	8	(2)
2023–	New Zealand	1	(0)
- * Club domestic league appearances and goals as of 27 August 2023 ‡ National team caps and goals as of 21 January 2023

Tayla Anne O'Brien (born 6 July 1994) is a New Zealand footballer who plays for NRFL Women's Premiership side Eastern Suburbs. She has represented New Zealand at senior and age group level.

== Club career ==
O'Brien is Eastern Suburbs third all time top goal scorer. In 2022 she finished as the top scorer of the New Zealand Women's National League, as Eastern Suburbs won the final 4–0.

== International career ==
O'Brien was called up to the New Zealand women's national football team for the first time in January 2023. O'Brien was one of three domestic players picked for the two game series against the United States along with Deven Jackson and Rebecca Lake. She made her debut as a second half substitute against the United States on 21 January 2023.

== Career statistics ==
=== International ===
As of match played 21 January 2023

National team	Year	Apps	Goals
New Zealand	2023	1	0
Total		1	0

== Honours ==
Northern Football

- New Zealand Women's National League: 2015

Auckland Football

- New Zealand Women's National League: 2017

Eastern Suburbs

- NRFL Women's Premiership: 2021
- New Zealand Women's National League: 2022

Individual

- New Zealand Women's National League top scorer: 2022
