= 2021 in New Zealand association football =

Football in New Zealand
- Season: 2021

Men's football
- National League: South Central Series (Note: In November 2021, New Zealand Football announced they had cancelled the 2021 New Zealand National League due to the COVID-19 pandemic in New Zealand. In place of this, the South Central series took place. This one off competition did not count as part the National League.): Miramar Rangers
- Northern League: Auckland City
- Central League: Wellington Olympic
- Southern League: Cashmere Technical
- Chatham Cup: Cashmere Technical

Women's football
- Women's National League: South Central Series: Southern United
- NRFL Women's Premier League: Eastern Suburbs
- Kate Sheppard Cup: Wellington United

The following is a list of association football events which took place in or relating to New Zealand in 2021. The year was the 131st season of competitive association football in New Zealand, and events were heavily impacted by the COVID-19 pandemic. This included the cancellation of the 2021 New Zealand National League, which was replaced by smaller regional competitions.

== National teams ==
=== New Zealand men's national football team ===
==== Results and fixtures ====
===== Unofficial =====
13 November Unofficial friendly	Algeria A'	1–2	New Zealand	Abu Dhabi, United Arab Emirates
	Bensayah 68'	Source	de Jong 16'; McCowatt 47'	Stadium: Zayed Sports City Stadium; Attendance: 0 (behind closed doors)

===== Friendlies =====
9 October Friendly	Curaçao	1–2	New Zealand	Riffa, Bahrain
19:00	Janga 72'	Report	Tuiloma 9'; Wood 33'	Stadium: Bahrain National Stadium; Attendance: 0 (behind closed doors)

12 October Friendly	Bahrain	0–1	New Zealand	Riffa, Bahrain
19:00		Report	Kirwan 89'	Stadium: Bahrain National Stadium; Attendance: 0 (behind closed doors)

16 November Friendly	New Zealand	2–0	Gambia	Abu Dhabi, United Arab Emirates
20:00	Wood 36', 66'	Report		Stadium: Zayed Sports City Stadium; Attendance: 0 (behind closed doors); Referee: Sultan Mohamed Al Hammadi (United Arab Emirates)

=== New Zealand women's national football team ===
==== Results and fixtures ====
===== Friendlies =====
14 July Friendly	Great Britain	3–0	New Zealand	Tokyo, Japan
	White; Parris	Report		Stadium: Todoroki Athletics Stadium; Attendance: 0 (behind closed doors)

23 October Friendly	Canada	5–1	New Zealand	Ottawa, Canada
15:00 UTC−4	Fleming 12' (pen.); Sinclair 41'; Prince 57'; Leon 75', 82'	Report	Percival 71' (pen.)	Stadium: TD Place Stadium; Attendance: 16,386

26 October Friendly	Canada	1–0	New Zealand	Montreal, Canada
19:30 UTC−4	Leon 16'	Report		Stadium: Saputo Stadium

27 November Friendly	South Korea	2–1	New Zealand	Goyang, South Korea
14:00	Moore 59' (o.g.); Lim 81'	Report	Hand 25'	Stadium: Goyang Stadium

30 November Friendly	South Korea	0–2	New Zealand	South Korea
19:00		Report	Satchell 83'; Rennie 85'

===== 2020 Summer Olympics =====
====== Group G ======
Pos	Team	Pld	W	D	L	GF	GA	GD	Pts	Qualification
1	Sweden	3	3	0	0	9	2	+7	9	Advance to knockout stage
2	United States	3	1	1	1	6	4	+2	4	Advance to knockout stage
3	Australia	3	1	1	1	4	5	−1	4	Advance to knockout stage
4	New Zealand	3	0	0	3	2	10	−8	0	

Source: TOCOG and FIFA
Rules for classification: Group stage tiebreakers

21 July Olympics GS	Australia	2–1	New Zealand	Tokyo, Japan
20:30 UTC+9	Yallop 20'; Kerr 33'	Report	Rennie 90+1'	Stadium: Tokyo Stadium

24 July Olympics GS	New Zealand	1–6	United States	Saitama, Japan
20:30 UTC+9	Hassett 72'	Report	Lavelle 9'; Horan 45'; Erceg 63' (o.g.); Press 80'; Morgan 88'; Bott 90+3' (o.g.)	Stadium: Saitama Stadium 2002; Attendance: 0 Referee: Stéphanie Frappart (France)

27 July Olympics GS	New Zealand	0–2	Sweden	Rifu, Japan
17:00 UTC+9		Report	Anvegård 17'; Janogy 29'	Stadium: Miyagi Stadium; Attendance: 884; Referee: Laura Fortunato (Argentina)

=== New Zealand national under-23 football team ===
==== Results and fixtures ====
===== Friendlies =====
12 July Friendly	Australia	0–2	New Zealand	Ichihara, Japan
19:00 (UTC+9)		Report (NZF); Report (SW)	Wood 55' (pen.); Just 83'	Stadium: ZA Oripri Stadium

15 July Friendly	Australia	1–0	New Zealand	Ichihara, Japan
18:00 (UTC+9)	Duke 3'	Report (NZF)		Stadium: ZA Oripri Stadium

===== 2020 Summer Olympics =====
====== Group B ======
Pos	Team	Pld	W	D	L	GF	GA	GD	Pts	Qualification
1	South Korea	3	2	0	1	10	1	+9	6	Advance to knockout stage
2	New Zealand	3	1	1	1	3	3	0	4	Advance to knockout stage
3	Romania	3	1	1	1	1	4	−3	4	
4	Honduras	3	1	0	2	3	9	−6	3	

Source: TOCOG and FIFA
Rules for classification: Group stage tiebreakers

22 July 2020 Summer Olympics GS Group B	New Zealand	1–0	South Korea	Kashima, Japan
17:00 UTC+9	Wood 70'	Report (FIFA); Report (SW)		Stadium: Kashima Stadium; Referee: Victor Gomes (South Africa)

25 July 2020 Summer Olympics GS Group B	New Zealand	2–3	Honduras	Kashima, Japan
17:00 UTC+9	Cacace 10'; Wood 49'	Report (FIFA); Report (SW)	Palma 45'; Obregón Jr. 78'; Rivas 87'	Stadium: Kashima Stadium; Referee: Orel Grinfeld (Israel)

28 July 2020 Summer Olympics GS Group B	Romania	0–0	New Zealand	Sapporo, Japan
17:30 UTC+9		Report (FIFA); Report (SW)		Stadium: Sapporo Dome

====== Knockout ======
31 July 2020 Summer Olympics Quarter-finals	Japan	0–0 (a.e.t.) (4–2 p)	New Zealand	Kashima, Japan
18:00 UTC+9		Report (FIFA); Report (SW)		Stadium: Kashima Soccer Stadium; Referee: Ismail Elfath (USA)
	Penalties
	Ueda (penalty scored); Itakura (penalty scored); Nakayama (penalty scored); Yoshida (penalty scored)		(penalty scored) Wood; (penalty missed) Cacace; (penalty missed) Lewis; (penalty scored) McCowatt

== FIFA competitions ==
=== FIFA Club World Cup ===
1 February 2021 First round	Al-Duhail (Qatar)	3–0; Awarded (Note: The Al-Duhail v Auckland City match was awarded as a 3–0 win to Al-Duhail after Auckland City withdrew due to the COVID-19 pandemic and related quarantine measures required by the New Zealand authorities.)	(New Zealand) Auckland City	Al Rayyan, Qatar
20:30		Report		Stadium: Ahmad bin Ali Stadium

== Men's football ==
League	Promoted to league	Relegated from league	Expelled or Dissolved	New
Northern League	None	None	None	Northern Rovers; West Coast Rangers
Central League	Wainuiomata	Stop Out	None	None
Southern League	New League			

=== National League: South Central Series ===
Pos	Team	Pld	W	D	L	GF	GA	GD	Pts	Qualification
1	Miramar Rangers (C)	5	3	2	0	13	10	+3	11	Qualification to Grand Final
2	Wellington Olympic	5	3	1	1	15	13	+2	10	Qualification to Grand Final
3	Cashmere Technical	5	3	0	2	8	4	+4	9	
4	Wellington Phoenix Reserves	5	2	0	3	15	8	+7	6	
5	Western Suburbs	5	2	0	3	6	11	−5	6	
6	Selwyn United	5	0	1	4	4	15	−11	1	

Updated to match(es) played on 5 December 2021. Source: New Zealand Football
Rules for classification: 1) Points; 2) Head to head points; 3) Head to head goal difference; 4) Goal difference; 5) Goals scored
(C) Champions

==== Grand final ====
Sunday, 12 December 2021
14:00 NZDT

Miramar Rangers	7–2	Wellington Olympic
Simes 8'; Mason-Smith 24'; Whyte 27', 39'; Delhommelle 52'; Midgley 59'; Moreira 87'	Report	Bouzoukis 19'; Chote 31'

Jerry Collins Stadium, Wellington
Referee: Campbell-Kirk Kawana-Waugh

=== Northern League ===
Pos	Team	Pld	W	D	L	GF	GA	GD	Pts	Qualification
1	Auckland City (C)	18	15	1	2	63	19	+44	46	Winner of Northern League and qualification to National League Championship
2	Auckland United	19	10	5	4	42	25	+17	35	Qualification to National League Championship
3	Eastern Suburbs	19	10	4	5	31	21	+10	34	Qualification to National League Championship
4	Birkenhead United	19	10	3	6	50	33	+17	33	Qualification to National League Championship
5	Western Springs	18	8	4	6	44	35	+9	28	
6	Bay Olympic	18	7	4	7	26	38	−12	25	
7	Hamilton Wanderers	18	6	5	7	35	44	−9	23	
8	Manukau United	19	5	7	7	33	35	−2	22	
9	North Shore United	19	5	7	7	35	40	−5	22	
10	Melville United	19	6	3	10	24	40	−16	21	
11	Northern Rovers (R)	19	2	5	12	22	41	−19	11	Relegation to NRFL Division 1
12	West Coast Rangers (R)	19	3	2	14	18	52	−34	11	Relegation to NRFL Division 1

Source: Auckland Football
Rules for classification: 1) Points; 2) Goal difference; 3) Goals scored; 4) Goals against; 5) Head to head; 6) Disciplinary record; 7) Coin toss
(C) Champions; (R) Relegated
- Melville won 1–0, but West Coast fielded an ineligible player. Result upgraded to a 3–0 win for Melville.
- North Shore won 2–0, but West Coast fielded an ineligible player. Result upgraded to a 3–0 win for North Shore.
- League completed early with games still in hand due to COVID-19 and Auckland being in Level 4.

=== Central League ===
Pos	Team	Pld	W	D	L	GF	GA	GD	Pts	Qualification
1	Wellington Olympic (C)	18	15	2	1	59	18	+41	47	Winner of Central League and qualification to National League Championship
2	Miramar Rangers	18	13	3	2	64	17	+47	42	Qualification to National League Championship
3	Lower Hutt City (Note: Lower Hutt City cannot qualify for the National League Championship phase due to their MoU with Wellington Phoenix Reserves.)	18	13	2	3	70	26	+44	41	
4	Western Suburbs	18	9	4	5	46	25	+21	31	Qualification to National League Championship
5	Wairarapa United (R)	18	6	6	6	37	44	−7	24	Withdrew before the 2022 season. (Note: Wairarapa United withdrew two weeks before the 2022 season and were replaced by Wellington United.)
6	Waterside Karori	18	6	4	8	31	42	−11	22	
7	Napier City Rovers	18	5	2	11	37	51	−14	17	
8	North Wellington	18	4	4	10	46	57	−11	16	
9	Petone	18	4	0	14	27	68	−41	12	
10	Wainuiomata (R)	18	1	1	16	17	86	−69	4	Relegation to Capital Premier

Source: Capital Football
Rules for classification: 1) Points; 2) Goal difference; 3) Goals scored; 4) Goals against; 5) Head to head; 6) Disciplinary record; 7) Coin toss
(C) Champions; (R) Relegated

=== Southern League ===
Pos	Team	Pld	W	D	L	GF	GA	GD	Pts	Qualification
1	Cashmere Technical (C)	7	6	0	1	25	7	+18	18	Winner of Southern League and qualification to National League Championship
2	Selwyn United	7	4	1	2	14	12	+2	13	Qualification to National League Championship
3	South City Royals	7	4	0	3	15	16	−1	12	
4	Otago University (R)	7	4	0	3	14	15	−1	12	Relegated to the FootballSouth Premier League (Note: Otago University were relegated due to not meeting the requirements of the 2022 National League.)
5	Christchurch United	7	3	1	3	20	15	+5	10	
6	Coastal Spirit	7	3	0	4	12	12	0	9	
7	Nelson Suburbs	7	1	1	5	10	17	−7	4	
8	Green Island	7	1	1	5	11	27	−16	4	

Source: Southern Football
Rules for classification: 1) Points; 2) Goal difference; 3) Goals scored; 4) Goals against; 5) Head to head; 6) Disciplinary record; 7) Coin toss
(C) Champions; (R) Relegated

=== Cup Competitions ===
==== Chatham Cup ====
===== Final =====
6 March 2022
14:00

Cashmere Technical	4–2	Miramar Rangers
Coughlan 42' (pen.), 65'; Taguchi 60', 89'	Report	O'Brien 75'; Wood 84'

Jerry Collins Stadium, Porirua
Attendance: 0 (Note: Played behind closed doors.)
Referee: Calvin Berg

== Women's football ==
=== National Women's League: South Central Series ===
Pos	Team	Pld	W	D	L	GF	GA	GD	Pts	Qualification
1	Southern United (C)	6	5	0	1	14	9	+5	15	Winner of Women's National League: South Central Series
2	Capital Football	6	4	0	2	15	5	+10	12	
3	Canterbury United Pride	6	3	0	3	18	12	+6	9	
4	Central Football	6	0	0	6	2	23	−21	0	

Updated to match(es) played on 11 December 2021. Source: New Zealand Football
Rules for classification: 1) Points; 2) Goal difference; 3) Goals scored; 4) Goals against; 5) Head to head; 6) Disciplinary record; 7) Coin toss
(C) Champions

=== NRFL Women's Premier League ===
Pos	Team	Pld	W	D	L	GF	GA	GD	Pts	Qualification
1	Eastern Suburbs (C)	18	12	2	4	41	28	+13	38	Winner of Northern League and qualification to National League Championship
2	Western Springs	18	11	1	6	36	29	+7	34	Qualification to National League Championship
3	Northern Rovers	18	7	6	5	42	40	+2	27	Qualification to National League Championship
4	Hamilton Wanderers	18	7	3	8	32	31	+1	24	Qualification to National League Championship
5	Ellerslie	18	4	5	9	28	32	−4	17	
6	Auckland United	18	3	3	12	19	38	−19	12	

Updated to match(es) played on 15 August 2021. Source: Northern Region Football
Rules for classification: 1) Points; 2) Goal difference; 3) Goals scored; 4) Goals against; 5) Head to head; 6) Disciplinary record; 7) Coin toss
(C) Champions
- League completed early with two rounds remaining due to COVID-19 and Auckland being in Level 4.
- There was no relegation with the league expanding to eight teams instead for 2022.

=== Cup Competitions ===
==== Kate Sheppard Cup ====
===== Final =====
27 March 2022
14:30

Hamilton Wanderers	0–1	Wellington United
	Report	Alder 56'

North Harbour Stadium, North Shore
Referee: Lindsey Robinson

== New clubs ==
- Northern Rovers
- South City Royals
- West Coast Rangers

== Clubs removed ==
- Canterbury United Dragons
- Hawke's Bay United
- Team Wellington
- Waitakere United
