= 2022 in New Zealand association football =

Football in New Zealand
- Season: 2022

Men's football
- National League: Auckland City
- Northern League: Auckland City
- Central League: Wellington Olympic
- Southern League: Christchurch United
- Chatham Cup: Auckland City

Women's football
- Women's National League: Eastern Suburbs
- NRFL Women's Premier League: Northern Rovers
- Kate Sheppard Cup: Auckland United

The 2022 season was the 132nd competitive association football season in New Zealand.

== National teams ==
=== New Zealand men's national football team ===
==== Results and fixtures ====
===== Friendlies =====
28 January Friendly	Jordan	3–1	New Zealand	Abu Dhabi, United Arab Emirates
19:00 UTC+04:00	Olwan 21', 80'; Al-Tamari 33' (pen.)	Report	Wood 30' (pen.)	Stadium: New York University Stadium; Attendance: 0 (behind closed doors); Referee: Ahmed Eisa Darwish (United Arab Emirates)

5 June Friendly	Peru	1–0	New Zealand	Barcelona, Spain
17:30 UTC+2	Lapadula 69'	Report		Stadium: RCDE Stadium; Attendance: 32,149; Referee: Ishmael Barbara (Malta)

9 June Friendly	Oman	0–0	New Zealand	Al Rayyan, Qatar
21:00 UTC+3		Report		Stadium: Education City Stadium; Attendance: 0 (Behind closed doors)

22 September Friendly	Australia	1–0	New Zealand	Brisbane, Australia
20:00 UTC+10	Mabil 32'	Report		Stadium: Suncorp Stadium; Attendance: 25,392; Referee: Ryuji Sato (Japan)

25 September Friendly	New Zealand	0–2	Australia	Auckland, New Zealand
16:00 UTC+12		Report	Duke 54'; Cummings 80' (pen.)	Stadium: Eden Park; Attendance: 34,985; Referee: Yusuke Araki (Japan)

===== FIFA World Cup qualification =====
====== Group B ======
Pos	Team	Pld	W	D	L	GF	GA	GD	Pts	Qualification
1	New Zealand	3	3	0	0	12	1	+11	9	Advance to final stage
2	Papua New Guinea	3	2	0	1	3	2	+1	6	Advance to final stage
3	Fiji	3	1	0	2	3	7	−4	3	
4	New Caledonia	3	0	0	3	2	10	−8	0	

Source: FIFA, OFC
Rules for classification: Tiebreakers

18 March 2022 FIFA World Cup qualification	Papua New Guinea	0–1	New Zealand	Doha, Qatar
17:00 UTC+3		Report (FIFA); Report (OFC)	Waine 75'	Stadium: Qatar SC Stadium; Attendance: 0 (behind closed doors); Referee: Saoud Ali Al-Adba (Qatar)

21 March 2022 FIFA World Cup qualification	New Zealand	4–0	Fiji	Doha, Qatar
20:00 UTC+3	Wood 45', 73'; Just 71'; Lewis 90+3' (pen.)	Report (FIFA); Report (OFC)		Stadium: Qatar SC Stadium; Attendance: 0 (behind closed doors); Referee: Salman Falahi (Qatar)

24 March 2022 FIFA World Cup qualification	New Zealand	7–1	New Caledonia	Doha, Qatar
20:00 UTC+3	Greive 8', 45+3'; Rogerson 36' (pen.); de Jong 74'; Tuiloma 81'; Wood 83', 90'	Report (FIFA); Report (OFC)	Saïko 12'	Stadium: Qatar SC Stadium; Attendance: 0 (behind closed doors); Referee: Norbert Hauata (Tahiti)

====== Final stage ======
27 March 2022 FIFA World Cup qualification	New Zealand	1–0	Tahiti	Doha, Qatar
20:30 UTC+3	Cacace 71'	Report (FIFA); Report (OFC)		Stadium: Al-Arabi Stadium; Attendance: 0 (behind closed doors); Referee: Abdulrahman Al-Jassim (Qatar)

30 March 2022 FIFA World Cup qualification	Solomon Islands	0–5	New Zealand	Doha, Qatar
20:00 UTC+3		Report (FIFA); Report (OFC)	Tuiloma 23', 70'; Wood 39'; Bell 50'; Garbett 90+1'	Stadium: Al-Arabi Stadium; Attendance: 0 (behind closed doors); Referee: Nawaf Shukralla (Bahrain)

===== 2022 FIFA World Cup qualification (inter-confederation play-offs) =====
14 June 2022 FIFA World Cup qualification	Costa Rica	1–0	New Zealand	Al Rayyan, Qatar
21:00 UTC+3	Campbell 3'	Report		Stadium: Ahmad bin Ali Stadium; Attendance: 10,803; Referee: Mohammed Abdulla Hassan Mohamed (United Arab Emirates)

=== New Zealand women's national football team ===
==== Results and fixtures ====
===== Friendlies =====
8 April Friendly	Australia	2–1	New Zealand	Townsville, Australia
19:45 AEDT	van Egmond 90+4'; Kerr 90+6'	Report	Green 32'	Stadium: QCB Stadium; Referee: Asaka Koizumi (England)

12 April 2022 Friendly	Australia	3–1	New Zealand	Canberra, Australia
19:45 UTC+10	Kerr 15', 32'; Raso 17'	Source	Wilkinson 45+3'	Stadium: GIO Stadium

25 June Friendly	Norway	2–0	New Zealand	Oslo, Norway
17:00 (UTC+1)		Source		Stadium: Ullevaal Stadion

28 June Friendly	Wales	0–0	New Zealand	San Pedro del Pinatar, Spain
19:00 (UTC+1)		Source		Stadium: Pinatar Arena

2 September 2022 Friendly	Mexico	0–1	New Zealand	Carson, California, United States
18:00 (UTC-7)		Report	Bott 84'	Stadium: Dignity Health Sports Park; Attendance: 0 (Note: Played behind closed doors.)

6 September 2022 Friendly	New Zealand	2–1	Philippines	Fullerton, California, United States
17:00 (UTC-7)	Moore 70' (pen.); Riley 83'	Report	Bolden 45+1'	Stadium: Titan Stadium

9 October 2022 Friendly	Japan	2–0	New Zealand	Nagano, Japan
14:55 UTC+9	Miyazawa 44'; Ueki 61'	Report		Stadium: Nagano U Stadium; Attendance: 2,100; Referee: Yujeong Kim (South Korea)

12 November 2022 Friendly	New Zealand	0–1	South Korea	Christchurch, New Zealand
14:30 UTC+13		Report (KFA)	Lee Min-a 31'	Stadium: Orangetheory Stadium

15 November 2022 Friendly	New Zealand	1–1	South Korea	Christchurch, New Zealand
18:00 UTC+13	Chance 13'	Report (KFA)	Ye-eun 57'	Stadium: Orangetheory Stadium; Attendance: 3523; Referee: Kate Jacewicz (Australia)

===== 2022 SheBelieves Cup =====
Pos	Team	Pld	W	D	L	GF	GA	GD	Pts
1st place, gold medalist(s)	United States (H)	3	2	1	0	10	0	+10	7
2nd place, silver medalist(s)	Iceland	3	2	0	1	3	6	−3	6
3rd place, bronze medalist(s)	Czech Republic	3	0	2	1	1	2	−1	2
4	New Zealand	3	0	1	2	0	6	−6	1

Source: USSoccer
Rules for classification: 1) points; 2) goal difference; 3) goals scored; 4) head-to-head result; 5) fair play ranking.
(H) Hosts

17 February SheBelieves Cup	Iceland	1–0	New Zealand	Carson, California, United States
20:00 ET	Brynjarsdóttir 1'	Report		Stadium: Dignity Health Sports Park; Referee: Katja Koroleva (United States)

20 February SheBelieves Cup	United States	5–0	New Zealand	Carson, California, United States
15:00 ET	Moore 5', 6', 36' (o.g.); Hatch 51'; Pugh 90+3'	Report		Stadium: Dignity Health Sports Park; Attendance: 16,587; Referee: Maria Belen Carvajal (Chile)

23 February SheBelieves Cup	New Zealand	0–0	Czech Republic	Frisco, Texas, United States
18:00 ET		Report		Stadium: Toyota Stadium; Attendance: 1,359; Referee: Danielle Chesky (United States)

=== New Zealand national under-20 football team ===
==== Results and fixtures ====
===== 2022 OFC U-19 Championship =====
====== Group A ======
Pos	Team	Pld	W	D	L	GF	GA	GD	Pts	Qualification
1	New Zealand	3	3	0	0	23	0	+23	9	Knockout stage
2	Solomon Islands	3	2	0	1	9	6	+3	6	Knockout stage
3	Cook Islands	3	1	0	2	4	11	−7	3	
4	American Samoa	3	0	0	3	0	19	−19	0	

Source: OFC

7 September 2022	Cook Islands	0–8	New Zealand	Stade Fautaua, Papeete
15:00		Report	Donkers 2', 22', 35', 43' (pen.); Herdman 39'; Colloty 70' (pen.), 84'; Fay 82'	Attendance: 200; Referee: Veer Singh (Fiji)

10 September 2022	New Zealand	9–0	American Samoa	Stade Fautaua, Papeete
15:00	Manuel 27'; Colloty 36', 49' (pen.), 58'; Beale 40', 73'; Surman 45+2'; Donkers 75' (pen.), 84'	Report		Attendance: 300; Referee: Keith Kitumbing (Papua New Guinea)

13 September 2022	New Zealand	6–0	Solomon Islands	Stade Fautaua, Papeete
15:00	Donkers 23', 45+1' (pen.); Supyk 55', 70'; O'Leary 67'; Conchie 87'	Report		Attendance: 120; Referee: Norbert Hauata (Tahiti)

====== Knockout stage ======
18 September 2022 Quarter-final	New Zealand	5–0	Papua New Guinea	Stade Pater, Pirae
16:30	McKay 20', 26'; Herdman 60'; Colloty 88', 90'	Report		Attendance: 150; Referee: Ben Aukwai (Solomon Islands)

21 September 2022 Semi-final	New Zealand	2–0	Tahiti	Stade Pater, Pirae
20:00	Hughes 2'; Donkers 52'	Report		Attendance: 1,200; Referee: Ben Aukwai (Solomon Islands)

24 September 2022 Final	Fiji	0–3	New Zealand	Stade Pater, Pirae
20:00		Report	Colloty 34', 40'; Herdman 83'	Attendance: 400; Referee: Norbert Hauata (Tahiti)

=== New Zealand women’s national under-20 football team ===
==== Results and fixtures ====
===== Friendlies =====
6 April 2022 Friendly	Australia	5–1	New Zealand	Canberra
18:30 UTC+10	Santos 2'; Hunter 21' (pen.); Galic 39'; Johnson 55'; Gallagher 57'	Report	Lancaster 44'	Stadium: Deakin Stadium; Referee: Anna-Marie Keighley (New Zealand)

10 April 2022 Friendly	Australia	1–1	New Zealand	Canberra
14:00 UTC+10	Hunter 10'	Report	Clegg 38'	Stadium: Viking Stadium; Referee: Georgia Ghirardello (Australia)

12 June 2022 Friendly	New Zealand	2–1	Australia	Auckland
14:00 UTC+12	Dugan 53'; Taylor 79' (pen.)	Report	Galic 2'	Stadium: Kiwitea Street; Attendance: 1,200

15 June 2022 Friendly	New Zealand	0–1	Australia	Auckland
		Report	Goal	Attendance: 0 (Behind closed doors)

===== 2022 FIFA U-20 Women's World Cup =====
====== Group B ======
Pos	Team	Pld	W	D	L	GF	GA	GD	Pts	Qualification
1	Colombia	3	1	2	0	3	2	+1	5	Knockout stage
2	Mexico	3	1	2	0	2	1	+1	5	Knockout stage
3	Germany	3	1	0	2	3	2	+1	3	
4	New Zealand	3	0	2	1	3	6	−3	2	

Source: FIFA
Rules for classification: Group stage tiebreakers

10 August 2022 Group stage	New Zealand	1–1	Mexico	Estadio Alejandro Morera Soto, Alajuela
14:00	Cazares 31' (o.g.)	Report	Vázquez 45'	Attendance: 1,007; Referee: Kim Yu-jeong (South Korea)

13 August 2022 Group stage	Germany	3–0	New Zealand	Estadio Alejandro Morera Soto, Alajuela
11:00	Fröhlich 58'; Weidauer 64' (pen.); Corley 90+4'	Report		Attendance: 1,391; Referee: Vincentia Amedome (Togo)

16 August 2022 Group stage	Colombia	2–2	New Zealand	Estadio Nacional de Costa Rica, San José
17:00	Caicedo 10', 63'	Report	Clegg 3'; Lancaster 71'	Attendance: 3,378; Referee: Tori Penso (United States)

=== New Zealand women’s national under-17 football team ===
==== Results and fixtures ====
===== 2022 FIFA U-17 Women's World Cup =====
====== Group B ======
Pos	Team	Pld	W	D	L	GF	GA	GD	Pts	Qualification
1	Germany	3	3	0	0	11	2	+9	9	Knockout stage
2	Nigeria	3	2	0	1	7	3	+4	6	Knockout stage
3	Chile	3	1	0	2	4	9	−5	3	
4	New Zealand	3	0	0	3	2	10	−8	0	

Source: FIFA
Rules for classification: Group stage tiebreakers

11 October 2022 2022 FIFA U-17 Women's World Cup GS	Chile	3–1	New Zealand	Margao, India
16:30	A. Figueroa 12'; Rovner 22' (pen.); Cifuentes 64'	Report (FIFA)	Clegg 52'	Stadium: Pandit Jawaharlal Nehru Stadium; Attendance: 4,064; Referee: Rebecca Welch (England)

14 October 2022 2022 FIFA U-17 Women's World Cup GS	New Zealand	0–4	Nigeria	Margao, India
16:30 UTC+5:30		Report (FIFA)	Bello 16'; Usani 34'; Afolabi 75'; Etim 90+5'	Stadium: Pandit Jawaharlal Nehru Stadium; Attendance: 2,191; Referee: Pansa Chaisanit (Thailand)

17 October 2022 2022 FIFA U-17 Women's World Cup GS	New Zealand	1–3	Germany	Margao, India
16:30 UTC+5:30	Clegg 10'	Report (FIFA)	Bender 5', 54'; Şehitler 60' (pen.)	Stadium: Pandit Jawaharlal Nehru Stadium; Attendance: 1,945; Referee: Bouchra Karboubi (Morocco)

== OFC Competitions ==
=== OFC Champions League ===
==== Group B ====
Pos	Team	Pld	W	D	L	GF	GA	GD	Pts	Qualification
1	(New Zealand) Auckland City (H)	3	3	0	0	12	1	+11	9	Knockout stage
2	(New Caledonia) Hienghène Sport	3	2	0	1	3	5	−2	6	Knockout stage
3	(Fiji) Rewa	3	1	0	2	3	6	−3	3	
4	(Cook Islands) Nikao Sokattack	3	0	0	3	2	8	−6	0	

Source: OFC
(H) Hosts

5 August 2022	Auckland City (New Zealand)	5−0	(New Caledonia) Hienghène Sport	Ngahue Reserve, Auckland
12:00	Mitchell 8'; Howieson 14'; Manickum 38'; Ilich 48'; Gillion 88'	Report (OFC)		Attendance: 120; Referee: Norbert Hauata (Tahiti)

8 August 2022	Rewa (Fiji)	0–3	(New Zealand) Auckland City	Ngahue Reserve, Auckland
12:00		Report (OFC)	Howieson 26' (pen.); Ilich 35'; Tade 90+4'	Attendance: 150; Referee: Ben Aukwai (Solomon Islands)

11 August 2022	Nikao Sokattack (Cook Islands)	1–4	(New Zealand) Auckland City	Ngahue Reserve, Auckland
15:00	Willis 39'	Report (OFC)	Garriga 40', 50'; Lee 55'; Ellis 65'	Attendance: 140; Referee: David Yareboinen (Papua New Guinea)

==== Knockout stage ====
14 August 2022	Auckland City (New Zealand)	2–0	(Solomon Islands) Central Coast	Ngahue Reserve, Auckland
14:30 UTC+12	Mitchell 26'; Manickum 90+5'	Report		Attendance: 350; Referee: Norbert Hauata (Tahiti)

===== Final =====
17 August 2022	Vénus (French Polynesia)	0–3	(New Zealand) Auckland City	Ngahue Reserve, Auckland
14:00 UTC+12		Report	Howieson 13' (pen.); Garriga 29'; Tade 88'	Attendance: 400; Referee: David Yareboinen (Papua New Guinea)

== Men's football ==
League	Promoted to league	Relegated from league	Removed	Joined
Northern League	Takapuna; Waiheke United	Northern Rovers; West Coast Rangers	None	None
Central League	Havelock North Wanderers; Wellington United	Wainuiomata	Lower Hutt City; Wairarapa United	Wellington Phoenix Reserves
Southern League	Ferrymead Bays; Mosgiel; Nomads United	None	Otago University	None

=== National League ===
Pos	Team	Pld	W	D	L	GF	GA	GD	Pts	Qualification
1	Auckland City (C)	9	7	1	1	20	9	+11	22 (Note: Head-to-head points: Auckland City 3, Wellington Olympic 0.)	Qualification to Grand Final and Champions League national play-offs
2	Wellington Olympic	9	7	1	1	30	8	+22	22	Qualification to Grand Final and Champions League national play-offs
3	Auckland United	9	5	2	2	14	13	+1	17	
4	Birkenhead United	9	4	2	3	19	17	+2	14	
5	Melville United	9	4	1	4	16	18	−2	13	
6	Wellington Phoenix Reserves (Note: Wellington Phoenix Reserves can not qualify for the Grand Final.)	9	3	3	3	16	14	+2	12 (Note: Head-to-head points: Wellington Phoenix Reserves 3, Cashmere Technical 0.)	
7	Cashmere Technical	9	4	0	5	19	18	+1	12	
8	Napier City Rovers	9	1	3	5	14	23	−9	6	
9	Christchurch United	9	1	2	6	12	26	−14	5	
10	Miramar Rangers	9	1	1	7	11	25	−14	4	

Source: New Zealand Football
Rules for classification: 1) Points; 2) Head to head; 3) Head to Head goal difference; 4) Goal difference; 5) Goals for
(C) Champions
Notes:
- Christchurch United won 4–1 in Round 9, but fielded an ineligible player. Result overturned to a 3–0 win for Cashmere Technical.

==== Grand final ====
Sunday, 4 December 2022
14:00 NZDT

Auckland City	3–2	Wellington Olympic
Gillion 33'; Garriga 40'; Kilkolly 88'	Report	Davenport-Petersen 77'; Mata 90+1' (pen.)

Mt Smart Stadium, Auckland
Referee: Calvin-kei Berg

=== Northern League ===
Pos	Team	Pld	W	D	L	GF	GA	GD	Pts	Qualification
1	Auckland City (C)	22	20	1	1	68	16	+52	61	Winner of Northern League and qualification to National League Championship
2	Birkenhead United	22	16	2	4	56	24	+32	50	Qualification to National League Championship
3	Auckland United	22	15	4	3	60	22	+38	49	Qualification to National League Championship
4	Melville United	22	15	0	7	55	22	+33	45	Qualification to National League Championship
5	Hamilton Wanderers	22	10	4	8	46	32	+14	34	
6	Western Springs	22	8	6	8	44	47	−3	30	
7	Manukau United	22	9	1	12	36	46	−10	28	
8	Bay Olympic	22	7	2	13	34	46	−12	23	
9	Takapuna	22	5	6	11	31	43	−12	21	
10	Eastern Suburbs	22	5	5	12	24	36	−12	20	
11	Waiheke United (R)	22	1	5	16	19	63	−44	8	Relegation to NRFL Championship
12	North Shore United (R)	22	2	2	18	18	94	−76	8	Relegation to NRFL Championship

Rules for classification: 1) Points; 2) Goal difference; 3) Goals scored; 4) Goals against; 5) Head to head; 6) Disciplinary record; 7) Coin toss
(C) Champions; (R) Relegated
- Christchurch United won 4–1 in Round 9, but fielded an ineligible player. Result overturned to a 3–0 win for Cashmere Technical.

=== Central League ===
Pos	Team	Pld	W	D	L	GF	GA	GD	Pts	Qualification
1	Wellington Olympic (C)	18	14	3	1	71	15	+56	45	Winner of Central League and qualification to National League Championship
2	Miramar Rangers	18	12	4	2	63	19	+44	40	Qualification to National League Championship
3	Wellington Phoenix Reserves (Note: Wellington Phoenix Reserves gain automatic entry into the National League Championship phase due to the A-League Men requirements.)	18	10	3	5	32	17	+15	33	Has automatic qualification to the National League Championship
4	Napier City Rovers	18	8	4	6	35	28	+7	28	Qualification to National League Championship
5	Waterside Karori	18	7	5	6	33	29	+4	26	
6	Petone	18	5	4	9	24	39	−15	19	
7	North Wellington	18	5	3	10	31	44	−13	18	
8	Wellington United (R)	18	5	3	10	22	40	−18	18	Withdrew before the 2023 season. (Note: Wellington United withdrew before the 2023 season and were replaced by Whanganui Athletic.)
9	Western Suburbs	18	4	2	12	21	66	−45	14	
10	Havelock North Wanderers (R)	18	3	3	12	21	56	−35	12	Relegation to Capital Premier/Central Federation League

Source: Capital Football
Rules for classification: 1) Points; 2) Goal difference; 3) Goals scored; 4) Goals against; 5) Head to head; 6) Disciplinary record; 7) Coin toss
(C) Champions; (R) Relegated
Notes:
- Christchurch United won 4–1 in Round 9, but fielded an ineligible player. Result overturned to a 3–0 win for Cashmere Technical.

=== Southern League ===
Pos	Team	Pld	W	D	L	GF	GA	GD	Pts	Qualification
1	Christchurch United (C)	18	16	1	1	74	12	+62	49	Winner of Southern League and qualification to National League Championship
2	Cashmere Technical	18	16	1	1	79	20	+59	49	Qualification to National League Championship
3	Nelson Suburbs	18	10	3	5	40	35	+5	33	
4	Dunedin City Royals	18	10	1	7	46	35	+11	31	
5	Ferrymead Bays	18	9	3	6	37	30	+7	30	
6	Coastal Spirit	18	3	7	8	34	43	−9	16	
7	Nomads United	18	4	3	11	28	57	−29	15	
8	Green Island	18	4	1	13	27	61	−34	13	
9	Selwyn United	18	2	5	11	27	48	−21	11	
10	Mosgiel (R)	18	2	3	13	21	72	−51	9	Relegated to the FootballSouth Premier League/Mainland Premier League

Source: Mainland Football
Rules for classification: 1) Points; 2) Goal difference; 3) Goals scored; 4) Goals against; 5) Head to head; 6) Disciplinary record; 7) Coin toss
(C) Champions; (R) Relegated
- Christchurch United won 4–1 in Round 9, but fielded an ineligible player. Result overturned to a 3–0 win for Cashmere Technical.

=== Cup Competitions ===
==== Chatham Cup ====
===== Final =====
11 September 2022
16:00

Auckland City (1)	1–0	Eastern Suburbs (2)
Manickum 56'	Report

North Harbour Stadium, Auckland
Attendance: 2,839
Referee: Ben O’Connell

== Women's football ==
=== National Women's League ===
- Western Springs drew 0–0 with Ellerslie on 15 July 2022, but Western Springs fielded an ineligible player. Result overturned to a 3–0 win for Ellerslie.

Pos	Team	Pld	W	D	L	GF	GA	GD	Pts	Qualification
1	Eastern Suburbs (C)	14	12	0	2	55	17	+38	36	Qualification to Grand Final
2	Western Springs	14	9	2	3	47	21	+26	29	Qualification to Grand Final
3	Northern Rovers	14	7	4	3	44	23	+21	25	
4	Canterbury United Pride	14	6	2	6	30	30	0	20	
5	Southern United	14	5	5	4	19	23	−4	20	
6	Auckland United	14	4	2	8	37	42	−5	14	
7	Capital Football	14	3	3	8	17	35	−18	12	
8	Central Football	14	1	0	13	12	70	−58	3	

Source: New Zealand Football
Rules for classification: 1) Points; 2) Goal difference; 3) Goals for; 4) Head to head; 5) Head to head goal difference; 6) Disciplinary record; 7) Coin toss
(C) Champions

==== Grand final ====
Sunday, 18 December 2022
14:00 NZDT

Eastern Suburbs	4–0	Western Springs
Tuisamoa 9' (o.g.); Yoshida 42'; Jackson 53', 83'	Report

Mt Smart Stadium, Auckland
Referee: Anna-Marie Keighley

=== NRFL Women’s Premier League ===
Pos	Team	Pld	W	D	L	GF	GA	GD	Pts	Qualification
1	Northern Rovers (C)	21	17	3	1	53	14	+39	54	Winner of Northern League and qualification to National League Championship
2	Western Springs	21	14	1	6	41	25	+16	43	Qualification to National League Championship
3	Eastern Suburbs	21	13	2	6	73	36	+37	41	Qualification to National League Championship
4	Auckland United	21	12	1	8	52	39	+13	37	Qualification to National League Championship
5	Ellerslie	21	8	3	10	42	34	+8	27	
6	West Coast Rangers	21	6	4	11	24	35	−11	22	
7	Hamilton Wanderers	21	5	1	15	26	56	−30	16	
8	Tauranga City (R)	21	1	1	19	13	85	−72	4	Relegation to NRF Championship/WaiBOP W-League

Source: Northern Region Football
Rules for classification: 1) Points; 2) Goal difference; 3) Goals scored; 4) Goals against; 5) Head to head; 6) Disciplinary record; 7) Coin toss
(C) Champions; (R) Relegated
- Western Springs drew 0–0 with Ellerslie on 15 July 2022, but Western Springs fielded an ineligible player. Result overturned to a 3–0 win for Ellerslie.

=== Cup Competitions ===
==== Kate Sheppard Cup ====
===== Final =====
11 September 2022
13:00

Northern Rovers (1)	0–1	Auckland United (1)
	Report	Puketapu 56'

North Harbour Stadium, Auckland

== Retirements ==
- 25 September 2022: Winston Reid, 34, former New Zealand defender.
