= 2023–24 Canberra United FC (women) season =

16th season in existence of Canberra United FC

Canberra United
2023–24 season
- Chairman: Kate Lundy
- Manager: Njegosh Popovich
- Stadium: McKellar Park
- A-League Women: 11th
- A-League Women Finals: DNQ
- Top goalscorer: Michelle Heyman (14)
- Highest home attendance: 2,229 vs. Perth Glory (4 November 2023); A-League Women
- Lowest home attendance: 1,235 vs. Western United (30 December 2023); A-League Women
- Average home league attendance: 1,678
- Biggest win: 5–1 vs. Brisbane Roar (H) (10 December 2023); A-League Women
- Biggest defeat: 0–3 vs. Central Coast Mariners (H) (23 December 2023); A-League Women; 1–4 vs. Western Sydney Wanderers (A) (13 March 2024); A-League Women; 1–4 vs. Central Coast Mariners (A) (17 March 2024); A-League Women
- All statistics correct as of 30 March 2024.

The 2023–24 season was the 16th in the history of Canberra United Football Club.

== Players ==
=== First-team squad ===
As of 27 March 2024

Note: Flags indicate national team as defined under FIFA eligibility rules; some limited exceptions apply. Players may hold more than one non-FIFA nationality.

No.	Pos.	Nation	Player
1	GK	AUS	Chloe Lincoln
2	DF	AUS	Alex McKenzie
3	DF	USA	Sarah Clark
4	DF	AUS	Holly Murray
5	DF	AUS	Emma Ilijoski
6	DF	AUS	Ava Piazza
8	MF	AUS	Sasha Grove
9	FW	NZL	Ruby Nathan
10	MF	AUS	Mary Stanic-Floody
11	FW	NZL	Deven Jackson
12	FW	AUS	Hayley Taylor-Young
13	FW	AUS	Sofia Christopherson

No.	Pos.	Nation	Player
14	DF	AUS	Maia Cameron
15	MF	AUS	Hannah McNulty
16	FW	AUS	Madelyn Whittall
17	MF	SRB	Vesna Milivojević
18	GK	AUS	Coco Majstorovic
19	FW	AUS	Nickoletta Flannery
20	FW	AUS	Lillian Skelly
22	DF	USA	Cannon Clough
23	FW	AUS	Michelle Heyman (captain)
24	GK	AUS	Georgia Ritchie
28	DF	AUS	Tegan Bertolissio

== Transfers ==
=== Transfers in ===
No.	Position	Player	Transferred from	Type/fee	Contract length	Date	Ref.
28	DF	Tegan Bertolissio	(Australia) Macarthur Rams	Free transfer	1 year	11 August 2023	
9	FW	(New Zealand) Ruby Nathan	(New Zealand) Auckland United	Free transfer	1 year	26 August 2023	
7	FW	(Chile) María José Rojas	Melbourne City	Free transfer	1 year	4 September 2023	
10	MF	Mary Stanic-Floody	Unattached	Free transfer	1 year	8 September 2023	
11	FW	(New Zealand) Deven Jackson	(New Zealand) Eastern Suburbs	Free transfer	1 year	15 September 2023	
22	DF	(United States) Cannon Clough	Newcastle Jets	Free transfer	1 year	18 September 2023	
2	DF	Alex McKenzie	(Australia) Illawarra Stingrays	Free transfer	1 year	5 October 2023	
6	DF	Ava Piazza	(Australia) Heidelberg United	Free transfer	1 year	6 October 2023	
18	GK	Coco Majstorovic	Unattached	Free transfer	1 year	10 October 2023	
24	GK	Georgia Ritchie	Unattached	Free transfer	1 year	10 October 2023	
14	DF	Maia Cameron	Unattached	Free transfer	1 year	11 October 2023	
15	MF	Hannah McNulty	(Australia) Northern Tigers	Free transfer	1 year	16 October 2023	
16	FW	Madelyn Whittall	(Australia) Canberra Olympic	Free transfer	1 year	16 October 2023	
3	MF	Michaela Thornton	(Australia) Canberra Olympic	Free transfer		19 October 2023	
3	DF	(United States) Sarah Clark	(United States) North Carolina Courage	Free transfer	6 months	14 December 2023	
20	FW	Lillian Skelly	(Australia) Football NSW Institute	Free transfer	6 months	19 December 2023	

=== Transfers out ===
No.	Position	Player	Transferred to	Type/fee	Date	Ref.
14	MF	Chloe Middleton	(Australia) Illawarra Stingrays	End of contract	2 March 2023	
7	DF	Ellie Brush	Retired		15 March 2023	
16	DF	(Canada) Kennedy Faulknor	(United States) Minnesota Aurora	Free transfer	24 April 2023	
3	DF	Grace Taranto	(Australia) Bulleen Lions	End of contract	19 May 2023	
15	MF	Madison McComasky	Western Sydney Wanderers	Free transfer	24 July 2023	
10	MF	(New Zealand) Grace Jale	Perth Glory	Free transfer	4 August 2023	
9	MF	(China) Wu Chengshu	(France) Dijon	End of contract	23 August 2023	
11	FW	Grace Maher	Western United	Free transfer	15 August 2023	
1	GK	Keeley Richards	Brisbane Roar	Free transfer	16 August 2023	
6	MF	Laura Hughes	Melbourne City	Free transfer	25 August 2023	
24	FW	Ellen Gett	Unattached	End of contract	28 September 2023	
22	GK	Keely Segavcic	Western Sydney Wanderers	Free transfer	11 October 2023	
3	MF	Michaela Thornton	Unattached		2 November 2023	
7	FW	(Chile) María José Rojas	(Chile) Santiago Morning	Undisclosed	27 March 2024	

=== Contract extensions ===
No.	Position	Player	Duration	Date	Ref.
17	(Serbia) Vesna Milivojević	Midfielder	1 year	10 August 2023	
13	Sofia Christopherson	Forward	1 year	11 October 2023	

== Pre-season and friendlies ==
23 September 2023	Western Sydney Wanderers (Australia)	0–0 (5–6 p)	(Australia) Canberra United	Forbes, Australia
		Report		Stadium: Botanical Gardens Sporting Grounds

== Competitions ==
=== Overall record ===
Competition	First match	Last match	Starting round	Final position	Record							
Competition	First match	Last match	Starting round	Final position	Pld	W	D	L	GF	GA	GD	Win %
A-League Women	15 October 2023	30 March 2024	Matchday 1	11th	22	6	6	10	39	47	−8	27.27
Total					22	6	6	10	39	47	−8	27.27

Source: Soccerway

=== A-League Women ===
==== League table ====
Pos	Team	Pld	W	D	L	GF	GA	GD	Pts
8	Wellington Phoenix (Note: Wellington Phoenix cannot qualify for Asian Football Confederation competitions as they are based in New Zealand, which is under the Oceania Football Confederation.)	22	9	1	12	36	33	+3	28
9	Brisbane Roar	22	7	5	10	28	35	−7	26
10	Perth Glory	22	6	6	10	25	32	−7	24
11	Canberra United	22	6	6	10	39	47	−8	24
12	Adelaide United	22	4	3	15	21	56	−35	15

Source: A-Leagues
Rules for classification: 1) points; 2) wins; 3) goal difference; 4) goals scored; 5) head-to-head results; 6) Fair Play points; 7) away head-to-head results; 8) home head-to-head results; 9) toss of a coin

==== Results summary ====
Overall								Home						Away					
Pld	W	D	L	GF	GA	GD	Pts	W	D	L	GF	GA	GD	W	D	L	GF	GA	GD
21	5	6	10	36	46	−10	21	4	2	4	19	17	+2	1	4	6	17	29	−12

Source: KEEPUP

==== Results by round ====
Round	1	2	3	6	7	8	9	10	4	11	12	13	14	15	16	18	19	5	20	21	17	22
Ground	A	A	H	H	H	A	H	H	A	A	N	H	A	H	A	A	H	A	A	H	H	A
Result	D	L	L	L	W	L	L	D	D	D	W	L	L	W	D	L	D	L	L	W	W	W
Position	6	9	10	12	11	12	12	12	12	12	11	11	12	12	12	12	12	12	12	11	11	11
Points	1	1	1	1	4	4	4	5	6	7	10	10	10	13	14	14	15	15	15	18	21	24

Source: KEEPUP
A = Away; H = Home; N = Neutral; W = Win; D = Draw; L = Loss

==== Matches ====
Win Draw Loss

15 October 2023 1	Adelaide United	4–4	Canberra United	Adelaide
14:30 ACDT	Jancevski 9' (pen.); Lee 53' (pen.); Blake 65'; Murray 90+5'	Report	Milivojević 16', 68'; Heyman 43'; Flannery 62'	Stadium: Coopers Stadium; Attendance: 2,834; Referee: Georgia Ghirardello

21 October 2023 2	Melbourne City	2–1	Canberra United	Melbourne
14:45 AEDT	Pollicina 26', 47' (pen.)	Report	Heyman 63'	Stadium: AAMI Park; Attendance: 2,138; Referee: Anna-Marie Keighley

4 November 2023 3	Canberra United	2–3	Perth Glory	Canberra
16:00 AEDT	Clough 16'; Milivojević 45' (pen.)	Report	Rigby 12'; Jale 40'; Sakalis 51' (pen.)	Stadium: McKellar Park; Attendance: 2,229; Referee: Isabella Libri

26 November 2023 6	Canberra United	3–4	Newcastle Jets	Canberra
16:00 AEDT	Heyman 2'; Milivojević 58', 90'	Report	Bolden 5', 61'; van Egmond 13'; Allan 81'	Stadium: McKellar Park; Attendance: 1,853; Referee: Rebecca Durcau

10 December 2023 7	Canberra United	5–1	Brisbane Roar	Canberra
16:00 AEDT	Milivojević 6', 17', 73'; Christopherson 37'; Stanic-Floody 73'	Report	Freier 49'	Stadium: McKellar Park; Attendance: 1,236; Referee: Rebecca Durcau

16 December 2023 8	Melbourne Victory	2–0	Canberra United	Melbourne
17:00 AEDT	Weinert 28'; Okino 57'	Report		Stadium: AAMI Park; Attendance: 6,033; Referee: Georgia Ghirardello

23 December 2023 9	Canberra United	0–3	Central Coast Mariners	Canberra
17:00 AEDT		Report	Wurigumula 29', 69'; Trimis 74'	Stadium: McKellar Park; Attendance: 1,285; Referee: Isabella Libri

30 December 2023 10	Canberra United	1–1	Western United	Canberra
17:00 AEDT	Cerne 30' (o.g.)	Report	A. Taranto 76'	Stadium: McKellar Park; Attendance: 1,235; Referee: Isabella Blaess

3 January 2024 4	Sydney FC	1–1	Canberra United	Sydney
16:00 AEDT	Keane 22'	Report	Heyman 32'	Stadium: Leichhardt Oval; Attendance: 3,378; Referee: Mikayla Ryan
Note: Originally scheduled for 12 November 2023, this match was postponed due to Sydney FC's participation in the 2023 AFC Women's Club Championship. It was rescheduled for 3 January 2024.

6 January 2024 11	Newcastle Jets	3–3	Canberra United	Newcastle
17:00 AEDT	Bolden 16'; Gooch 51'; Barbieri 72'	Report	Flannery 23'; Jackson 31'; Clark 84'	Stadium: Newcastle Number 2 Sports Ground; Attendance: 2,112; Referee: Bec Mackie

13 January 2024 12	Canberra United	3–1	Adelaide United	Sydney
17:00 AEDT	Heyman 50', 51'; Milivojević 64'	Report	I. Hodgson 46'	Stadium: Leichhardt Oval; Attendance: 1,183; Referee: Rebecca Durcau

20 January 2024 13	Canberra United	2–3	Melbourne Victory	Canberra
17:00 AEDT	Heyman 5', 70'	Report	Lowe 18'; Chidiac 46'; Gielnik 90+3'	Stadium: McKellar Park; Attendance: 2,148; Referee: Isabella Mossin

28 January 2024 14	Wellington Phoenix	2–0	Canberra United	Porirua
17:00 NZDT	Speckmaier 43', 52'	Report		Stadium: Jerry Collins Stadium; Attendance: 1,227; Referee: Molly Godsell

4 February 2024 15	Canberra United	3–1	Melbourne City	Canberra
17:00 AEDT	Heyman 37'; Stanic-Floody 39'; Flannery 74'	Report	Otto 90+1'	Stadium: McKellar Park; Attendance: 2,189; Referee: Bec Mackie

10 February 2024 16	Perth Glory	2–2	Canberra United	Perth
19:30 AWST	Phonsongkham 35'; Dalton 90+2'	Report	Heyman 9', 44'	Stadium: Macedonia Park; Attendance: 1,003; Referee: Rebecca Durcau

1 March 2024 18	Western United	4–2	Canberra United	Melbourne
19:00 AEDT	Keane 1', 14', 64'; Logarzo 10' (pen.)	Report	Jackson 49'; Heyman 90+5'	Stadium: City Vista Recreation Reserve; Attendance: 574; Referee: Isabella Libri

9 March 2024 19	Canberra United	1–1	Western Sydney Wanderers	Canberra
16:00 AEDT	Flannery 57'	Report	Morris 90+7'	Stadium: McKellar Park; Attendance: 1,584; Referee: Bec Mackie

13 March 2024 5	Western Sydney Wanderers	4–1	Canberra United	Sydney
19:00 AEDT	Caspers 4', 46'; Buchanan 14'; McComasky 46'	Report	Heyman 1'	Stadium: Wanderers Football Park; Attendance: 376; Referee: Kelly Jones
Note: Match originally scheduled for 18 November 2023, but postponed to 13 March 2024 due to venue unavailability at the time.

17 March 2024 20	Central Coast Mariners	4–1	Canberra United	Gosford
15:00 AEDT	Wurigumula 4'; Badawiya 6', 35'; Simon 33' (pen.)	Report	Flannery 87'	Stadium: Industree Group Stadium; Attendance: 1,811; Referee: Caitlin Williams

24 March 2024 21	Canberra United	1–0	Wellington Phoenix	Canberra
14:00 AEDT	Heyman 78'	Report		Stadium: McKellar Park; Attendance: 1,341; Referee: Isabella Mossin

27 March 2024 17	Canberra United	1–0	Sydney FC	Canberra
16:00 AEDT	Heyman 78'	Report		Stadium: McKellar Park; Attendance: 957; Referee: Georgia Ghirardello
Note: Match abandoned due to lightning on 17 February 2024, and to be replayed at a later date. It was rescheduled for 27 March 2024.

30 March 2024 22	Brisbane Roar	1–2	Canberra United	Brisbane
15:00 AEST	McCormick 43'	Report	Heyman 84'; Milivojević 86'	Stadium: Perry Park; Attendance: 2,842; Referee: Kate Jacewicz

== Statistics ==
=== Appearances and goals ===
Includes all competitions. Players with no appearances not included in the list.

No.	Pos.	Nat.	Name	A-League Women		Total	
No.	Pos.	Nat.	Name	Apps	Goals	Apps	Goals
1	GK	(Australia)	Chloe Lincoln	17	0	17	0
2	DF	(Australia)	Alex McKenzie	11+6	0	17	0
3	DF	(United States)	Sarah Clark	15+1	1	16	1
4	DF	(Australia)	Holly Murray	9+7	0	16	0
5	DF	(Australia)	Emma Ilijoski	15+2	0	17	0
6	DF	(Australia)	Ava Piazza	3+3	0	6	0
7	FW	(Chile)	María José Rojas	4+9	0	13	0
8	MF	(Australia)	Sasha Grove	18	0	18	0
9	FW	(New Zealand)	Ruby Nathan	6+15	0	21	0
10	MF	(Australia)	Mary Stanic-Floody	16	2	16	2
11	MF	(New Zealand)	Deven Jackson	13+8	2	21	2
13	FW	(Australia)	Sofia Christopherson	14+8	1	22	1
14	DF	(Australia)	Maia Cameron	0+1	0	1	0
15	DF	(Australia)	Hannah McNulty	0+3	0	3	0
16	FW	(Australia)	Madelyn Whittall	6+6	0	12	0
17	MF	(Serbia)	Vesna Milivojević	21+1	10	22	10
18	GK	(Australia)	Coco Majstorovic	5+2	0	7	0
19	MF	(Australia)	Nickoletta Flannery	20+1	5	21	5
20	FW	(Australia)	Lillian Skelly	0+1	0	1	0
22	DF	(United States)	Cannon Clough	19	1	19	1
23	FW	(Australia)	Michelle Heyman	20+2	16	22	16
28	DF	(Australia)	Tegan Bertolissio	10+5	0	15	0

=== Disciplinary record ===
Includes all competitions. The list is sorted by squad number when total cards are equal. Players with no cards not included in the list.

Rank	No.	Pos.	Nat.	Name	A-League Women			Total		
Rank	No.	Pos.	Nat.	Name	Yellow card	(yellow card) (yellow-red card)	Red card	Yellow card	(yellow card) (yellow-red card)	Red card
1	1	GK	(Australia)	Chloe Lincoln	0	0	1	0	0	1
2	13	FW	(Australia)	Sofia Christopherson	5	0	0	5	0	0
3	19	MF	(Australia)	Nickoletta Flannery	3	0	0	3	0	0
4	6	DF	(Australia)	Ava Piazza	2	0	0	2	0	0
4	17	MF	(Serbia)	Vesna Milivojević	2	0	0	2	0	0
6	3	DF	(United States)	Sarah Clark	1	0	0	1	0	0
6	8	MF	(Australia)	Sasha Grove	1	0	0	1	0	0
6	9	FW	(New Zealand)	Ruby Nathan	1	0	0	1	0	0
6	10	MF	(Australia)	Mary Stanic-Floody	1	0	0	1	0	0
6	22	DF	(United States)	Cannon Clough	1	0	0	1	0	0
6	28	DF	(Australia)	Tegan Bertolissio	1	0	0	1	0	0
Total					18	0	1	18	0	1

=== Clean sheets ===
Includes all competitions. The list is sorted by squad number when total clean sheets are equal. Numbers in parentheses represent games where both goalkeepers participated and both kept a clean sheet; the number in parentheses is awarded to the goalkeeper who was substituted on, whilst a full clean sheet is awarded to the goalkeeper who was on the field at the start of play. Goalkeepers with no clean sheets not included in the list.

Rank	No.	Nat.	Goalkeeper	A-League Women	Total
1	1	(Australia)	Chloe Lincoln	2	2
Total				2	2
