= Ruby Nathan =

New Zealand footballer

Personal information
- Full name: Ruby Sofia Nathan
- Date of birth: 11 October 2005 (age 21)
- Place of birth: Auckland, New Zealand
- Height: 1.83 m (6 ft 0 in)
- Position: Striker

Team information
- Current team: Eastern Suburbs

Youth career
- –2021: Eastern Suburbs

Senior career*
Years	Team	Apps	(Gls)
2021–2023	Auckland United		
2023–2025	Canberra United	35	(1)
2025–	Eastern Suburbs	5	(4)

International career^{‡}
2022	New Zealand U-17	3	(0)
2022–	New Zealand U-20	9	(8)
2023–	New Zealand	5	(1)
- * Club domestic league appearances and goals as of 28 May 2025 ‡ National team caps and goals as of 20 February 2024

Ruby Sofia Nathan (born 11 October 2005) is a New Zealand footballer who currently plays for Eastern Suburbs and the New Zealand national team.

== Club career ==
Nathan started her footballing career at age 6, moving through the junior ranks of suburban Auckland club Eastern Suburbs, before moving to Auckland United. In 2021 and 2022, Nathan managed 13 goals for the club. Nathan would sign her first ever professional contract in the A-League Women with Canberra United FC following her performances at the 2022 FIFA U-20 Women's World Cup and 2022 FIFA U-17 Women's World Cup.

In February 2024, Nathan was nominated for the 2023 New Zealand Women’s Domestic Player of the Year.

== International career ==
=== Youth Internationals ===
Nathan was selected to represent the New Zealand U17s at the 2022 FIFA U-17 Women's World Cup alongside fellow Auckland United player Milly Clegg, in addition to the 2022 FIFA U-20 Women's World Cup, both of which New Zealand were unsuccessful at, finishing last in their group in the respective tournaments.

In 2023, Nathan was selected as part of the New Zealand U-19s team to play in the 2023 OFC U-19 Women's Championship. Despite not scoring in the opening round of the tournament, in which New Zealand beat Fiji and Papua New Guinea 3–0 & 11–0 respectively, Nathan would go on to win the Golden Boot with 8 goals at the tournament, as she netted 5 goals in the 19–0 rout against Solomon Islands in the Quarter finals, a single goal against Cook Islands, and a brace in the final against Fiji, which New Zealand would win 7–0, qualifying them for the 2024 FIFA U-20 Women's World Cup.

=== Senior ===
Nathan's performances for New Zealand in the youth internationals earned her to be called up to the New Zealand national team in 2023 for two friendlies against Colombia. Nathan made her debut in the second game, coming on as a second-half substitute.

== Career statistics ==
=== Club ===
As of match played on 30 March 2024.

Appearances and goals by club, season and competition
Club	Season	League			Cup		Others		Total	
Club	Season	Division	Apps	Goals	Apps	Goals	Apps	Goals	Apps	Goals
Canberra United	2023–24	A-League Women	21	0	—		—		21	0
Career total			21	0	—		—		21	0

=== International ===
As of match played on 19 February 2024.

Appearances and goals by national team and year
National team	Year	Apps	Goals
New Zealand	2023	1	0
New Zealand	2024	4	1
Total		5	1

=== International goals ===
No.	Cap	Date	Venue	Opponent	Score	Result	Competition
1.	5	19 February 2024	FFS Football Stadium, Apia, Samoa	Solomon Islands	11–1	11–1	2024 OFC Women's Olympic Qualifying Tournament

== Honours ==
Auckland United

- Kate Sheppard Cup: 2022
- NRFL Women's Premiership: 2023

New Zealand U20

- OFC U-19 Women's Championship: 2023

Individual

- OFC U-19 Women's Championship top scorer: 2023
