= Deven Jackson =

New Zealand footballer (born 1998)

Personal information
- Full name: Deven Rose Jackson
- Date of birth: 22 April 1998 (age 28)
- Place of birth: Auckland, New Zealand
- Position: Forward

Team information
- Current team: Melbourne City
- Number: 11

Youth career
- Bay Olympic

College career
Years	Team	Apps	(Gls)
2017–2019	Western Kentucky Lady Toppers	33	(4)

Senior career*
Years	Team	Apps	(Gls)
- Three Kings United
2015	Auckland Football		
2022–2023	Eastern Suburbs	?	(28)
2023–2024	Canberra United	21	(2)
2024–2025	Newcastle Jets	18	(6)
2025–	Melbourne City	21	(1)

International career^{‡}
2017	New Zealand U20	3	(3)
2023–	New Zealand	10	(1)
- * Club domestic league appearances and goals as of 23 May 2026 ‡ National team caps and goals as of 23 May 2026

Deven Rose Jackson (born 22 April 1998) is a New Zealand footballer who plays as a forward for A-League Women side Melbourne City. She has represented New Zealand at senior and age group level.

== College career ==
=== Western Kentucky University ===
Jackson studied a degree in Sport & Recreation, majoring in Sport & Exercise Science. In 2017 and 2019 she made a total of 33 appearances, scoring 4 goals. In 2018 she was ruled out due to an injury.

== Club career ==
=== Early career ===
Jackson started her youth football at Bay Olympic. Jackson started her senior career for Three Kings United. In 2023, Jackson was appointed as a strength and conditioning coach for youth teams at Bay Olympic.

=== Eastern Suburbs ===
Jackson took a three-year break from football undertaking three hip surgeries during this time, before returning to play for Eastern Suburbs

Jackson is Eastern Suburbs fifth all-time top goal scorer with 50 goals. In 2022 she finished as the second top scorer of the New Zealand Women's National League, behind teammate Tayla O'Brien. Eastern Suburbs won the final 4–0, with Jackson scoring a brace and having a third ruled out as an own goal.

=== Canberra United ===
On 15 September 2023, Jackson signed for her first professional contract for Canberra United. She made her debut on 15 October 2023 in the season opener against Adelaide United. Jackson scored her first goal 6 January 2024 in a 3–3 draw with Newcastle Jets.

=== Newcastle Jets ===
In September 2024, Jackson joined fellow A-League Women club Newcastle Jets. In August 2025, the club announced Jackson's departure to take up an opportunity at another A-League club.

=== Melbourne City ===
A few hours after announcing her departure from Newcastle Jets in August 2025, Jackson signed with Melbourne City.

== International career ==
Jackson was called up to the New Zealand women's national football team for the first time in January 2023. Jackson was one of three domestic players picked for the two-game series against the United States along with Tayla O'Brien and Rebecca Lake. She made her debut as a half time substitute against the United States on 21 January 2023.

== Career statistics ==
=== Club ===
As of match played on 30 March 2024.

Appearances and goals by club, season and competition
Club	Season	League			Cup		Others		Total	
Club	Season	Division	Apps	Goals	Apps	Goals	Apps	Goals	Apps	Goals
Canberra United	2023–24	A-League Women	21	2	—		—		21	2
Career total			21	2	—		—		21	2

=== International ===
As of match played on 27 February 2026.

Appearances and goals by national team and year
National team	Year	Apps	Goals
New Zealand	2023	1	0
New Zealand	2025	5	0
New Zealand	2026	1	1
Total		7	1

List of international goals scored by Deven Jackson.
No.	Date	Venue	Opponent	Score	Result	Competition
1.	27 February 2026	National Stadium, Honiara, Solomon Islands	Samoa	8–0	8–0	2027 FIFA Women's World Cup qualification

== Honours ==
Eastern Suburbs

- New Zealand Women's National League: 2022

New Zealand U17

- OFC U-19 Women's Championship: 2017

Individual

- New Zealand Women's Domestic Player of the Year: 2023
