= 2022 New Zealand National League =

Football championship

New Zealand National League
- Season: 2022
- Dates: 25 March 2022 – 4 December 2022
- Champions: Auckland City
- OFC Champions League: Auckland City; Wellington Olympic
- Matches: 46
- Goals: 178 (3.87 per match)
- Best player: Silvio Rodić (Birkenhead United)
- Top goalscorer: Garbhan Coughlan; Gianni Bouzoukis (9 goals)
- Biggest home win: Wellington Olympic 7–1 Christchurch United (19 November 2022)
- Biggest away win: Melville United 0–4 Wellington Olympic (9 October 2022)
- Highest scoring: Birkenhead United 5–3 Cashmere Technical (30 October 2022); Wellington Olympic 7–1 Christchurch United (19 November 2022)
- Longest winning run: 5 matches Wellington Olympic
- Longest unbeaten run: 7 matches Wellington Olympic
- Longest winless run: 7 matches Napier City Rovers
- Longest losing run: 3 matches Miramar Rangers; Napier City Rovers

The 2022 New Zealand Men's National League was the second scheduled season of the National League since its restructuring in 2021; the 2021 National League was cancelled due to the COVID-19 pandemic in northern regions. 32 clubs competed in the competition, with four qualifying from the Northern League, three qualifying from the Central League and two qualifying from the Southern League for the National Championship phase. Each team could field a maximum of four foreign players as well as one additional foreign player who has Oceania Football Confederation nationality. Each team also had to field at least two players aged 20 or under in the starting eleven.

This season the Wellington Phoenix Reserves replaced Lower Hutt City and was allowed to play in the Central League though they still had an automatic entry into the Championship phase. The Southern League also increased by two teams to have ten, adding three new sides to the league.

== Qualifying leagues ==
=== 2022 Northern League ===
Northern League
- Season: 2022
- Dates: 26 March 2022 - 3 September 2022
- Champions: Auckland City
- Relegated: Waiheke United; North Shore United
- Matches: 132
- Goals: 491 (3.72 per match)
- Top goalscorer: Derek Tieku (17)
- Biggest home win: Bay Olympic 7–0 North Shore United (4 June 2022); Auckland United 7–0 Waiheke United (6 August 2022)
- Biggest away win: North Shore United 1–7 Auckland City (18 April 2022); North Shore United 1–7 Melville United (21 May 2022); North Shore United 0–6 Auckland United (20 August 2022)
- Highest scoring: Seven games with 8 goals scored
- Longest winning run: 18 matches Auckland City
- Longest unbeaten run: 21 matches Auckland City
- Longest winless run: 18 matches Waiheke United
- Longest losing run: 8 matches North Shore United
- All statistics correct as of 3 September 2022.

==== Northern League teams ====
Twelve teams are competing in the league – the top ten teams from the previous season and the two teams promoted from the 2021 NRFL Division 1. The promoted teams are Waiheke United and Takapuna. This is both Waiheke's and Takapuna's first season in the Northern League. They replaced Northern Rovers and West Coast Rangers (both teams relegated after their debut seasons in the Northern League).

| Team | Home ground | Location | 2021 season |
|---|---|---|---|
| Auckland City | Kiwitea Street | Sandringham, Auckland | 1st |
| Auckland United | Keith Hay Park | Mount Roskill, Auckland | 2nd |
| Bay Olympic | Olympic Park | New Lynn, Auckland | 6th |
| Birkenhead United | Shepherds Park | Beach Haven, Auckland | 4th |
| Eastern Suburbs | Madills Farm | Kohimarama, Auckland | 3rd |
| Hamilton Wanderers | Porritt Stadium | Chartwell, Hamilton | 7th |
| Manukau United | Centre Park | Māngere East, Auckland | 8th |
| Melville United | Gower Park | Melville, Hamilton | 10th |
| North Shore United | Allen Hill Stadium | Devonport, Auckland | 9th |
| Takapuna | Taharoto Park | Takapuna, Auckland | 2nd in Division 1 (promoted) |
| Waiheke United | Onetangi Sports Park | Waiheke Island, Auckland | 1st in Division 1 (promoted) |
| Western Springs | Seddon Fields | Westmere, Auckland | 5th |

==== Northern League personnel and kits ====
| Team | Manager | Captain | Kit manufacturer | Shirt sponsor |
|---|---|---|---|---|
| Auckland City | (Spain) Albert Riera | (New Zealand) Cam Howieson | Dynasty | Ockham; Trillian Trust |
| Auckland United | (England) José Figueira | (New Zealand) Ross Haviland | Adidas | Signbiz |
| Bay Olympic | (New Zealand) Liam Mulrooney | (England) Tom Boss | Nike | Mitre 10 Mega New Lynn |
| Birkenhead United | (England) Paul Hobson | (New Zealand) Sam Burfoot | Kappa | Harcourts Cooper & Co |
| Eastern Suburbs | (New Zealand) Hoani Edwards | (New Zealand) Michael Built | Calcio | Winger Motors |
| Hamilton Wanderers | (Wales) Joe Hinds | (Ghana) Derek Tieku | Dynasty | Tall Poppy Real Estate; Smith & McKenzie |
| Manukau United | (Czech Republic) Rudy Mozr | | Joma | Munchy Mart |
| Melville United | (New Zealand) Sam Wilkinson | (New Zealand) Aaron Scott | Joma | NZ Roadside Assistance |
| North Shore United | (Italy) Valerio Raccuglia | (Croatia) Silvio Rodić | Nike | Atlas Concrete |
| Takapuna | (New Zealand) Chris Milicich | (New Zealand) Connor Cahil-Fahey | Lotto Sport Italia | None |
| Waiheke United | (South Africa) Thabiso Tleane | (Argentina) Alan Llunes | Nike | Fullers 360 |
| Western Springs | (New Zealand) Chris Zoricich | (New Zealand) Dane Schnell | Lotto Sport Italia | Integration Works |

==== Northern League table ====
| Pos | Team | Pld | W | D | L | GF | GA | GD | Pts | Qualification |
|---|---|---|---|---|---|---|---|---|---|---|
| 1 | Auckland City (C) | 22 | 20 | 1 | 1 | 68 | 16 | +52 | 61 | Winner of Northern League and qualification to National League Championship |
| 2 | Birkenhead United | 22 | 16 | 2 | 4 | 56 | 24 | +32 | 50 | Qualification to National League Championship |
| 3 | Auckland United | 22 | 15 | 4 | 3 | 60 | 22 | +38 | 49 | Qualification to National League Championship |
| 4 | Melville United | 22 | 15 | 0 | 7 | 55 | 22 | +33 | 45 | Qualification to National League Championship |
| 5 | Hamilton Wanderers | 22 | 10 | 4 | 8 | 46 | 32 | +14 | 34 | |
| 6 | Western Springs | 22 | 8 | 6 | 8 | 44 | 47 | −3 | 30 | |
| 7 | Manukau United | 22 | 9 | 1 | 12 | 36 | 46 | −10 | 28 | |
| 8 | Bay Olympic | 22 | 7 | 2 | 13 | 34 | 46 | −12 | 23 | |
| 9 | Takapuna | 22 | 5 | 6 | 11 | 31 | 43 | −12 | 21 | |
| 10 | Eastern Suburbs | 22 | 5 | 5 | 12 | 24 | 36 | −12 | 20 | |
| 11 | Waiheke United (R) | 22 | 1 | 5 | 16 | 19 | 63 | −44 | 8 | Relegation to NRFL Championship |
| 12 | North Shore United (R) | 22 | 2 | 2 | 18 | 18 | 94 | −76 | 8 | Relegation to NRFL Championship |

Rules for classification: 1) Points; 2) Goal difference; 3) Goals scored; 4) Goals against; 5) Head to head; 6) Disciplinary record; 7) Coin toss
(C) Champions; (R) Relegated

==== Northern League results table ====
| Home \ Away | AC | AU | BO | BU | ES | HW | MAN | MEL | NS | TP | WU | WS |
|---|---|---|---|---|---|---|---|---|---|---|---|---|
| Auckland City | — | 2–0 | 2–1 | 3–0 | 2–1 | 2–0 | 3–1 | 2–1 | 6–0 | 2–1 | 4–0 | 4–0 |
| Auckland United | 2–0 | — | 5–0 | 0–1 | 1–1 | 2–1 | 4–1 | 2–0 | 4–2 | 3–3 | 7–0 | 2–1 |
| Bay Olympic | 0–4 | 1–4 | — | 0–1 | 0–0 | 0–2 | 2–4 | 0–5 | 7–0 | 1–2 | 3–1 | 3–1 |
| Birkenhead United | 3–5 | 1–1 | 3–0 | — | 4–0 | 2–0 | 2–1 | 0–1 | 6–0 | 1–2 | 5–3 | 5–2 |
| Eastern Suburbs | 1–4 | 0–1 | 1–0 | 1–3 | — | 1–2 | 0–2 | 1–4 | 4–2 | 4–0 | 2–1 | 0–0 |
| Hamilton Wanderers | 1–1 | 3–5 | 2–1 | 1–2 | 2–0 | — | 1–2 | 2–3 | 6–0 | 2–2 | 3–0 | 1–1 |
| Manukau United | 0–3 | 0–4 | 2–3 | 0–4 | 1–1 | 0–2 | — | 0–4 | 6–0 | 3–2 | 3–2 | 0–1 |
| Melville United | 0–1 | 2–0 | 2–3 | 0–2 | 1–0 | 4–1 | 0–1 | — | 3–0 | 2–0 | 4–1 | 3–1 |
| North Shore United | 1–7 | 0–6 | 0–4 | 1–2 | 2–2 | 0–5 | 2–0 | 1–7 | — | 1–3 | 3–3 | 1–6 |
| Takapuna | 0–4 | 1–3 | 1–1 | 2–4 | 1–0 | 2–2 | 2–3 | 0–1 | 0–1 | — | 0–0 | 4–4 |
| Waiheke United | 0–2 | 1–1 | 0–3 | 0–4 | 1–3 | 1–2 | 0–3 | 1–6 | 2–0 | 0–3 | — | 1–1 |
| Western Springs | 3–5 | 1–3 | 4–1 | 1–1 | 2–1 | 1–5 | 4–3 | 3–2 | 5–1 | 1–0 | 1–1 | — |

Source: Soccerway
Legend: Blue = home team win; Yellow = draw; Red = away team win.

==== Northern League scoring ====
===== Northern League top scorers =====
| Rank | Player | Club | Goals |
|---|---|---|---|
| 1 | Derek Tieku | Hamilton Wanderers | 17 |
| 2 | Oliver Colloty | Melville United | 14 |
| 3 | Joshua Redfearn | Auckland United | 13 |
| 4 | Emiliano Tade | Auckland City | 12 |
| 5 | Angus Kilkolly | Auckland City | 11 |
| 6 | Oscar Browne | Western Springs | 10 |
| 6 | Nicolas Zambrano | Auckland United | 10 |
| 8 | Dawson Straffon | Western Springs | 9 |
| 9 | Cameron MacKenzie | Birkenhead United | 8 |
| 10 | Matthew Conroy | Auckland United | 7 |
| 10 | Joseph Harris | Hamilton Wanderers | 7 |
| 10 | Kayne Vincent | Western Springs | 7 |
| 10 | Darren White | Bay Olympic | 7 |

===== Northern League hat-tricks =====
| Round | Player | For | Against | Home/Away | Result | Date |
|---|---|---|---|---|---|---|
| 1 | Thomas Leabourn-Boss | Bay Olympic | North Shore United | Away | 0–4 | 26 March 2022 |
| 2 | Joshua Redfearn | Auckland United | Manukau United | Away | 0–4 | 2 April 2022 |
| 6 | Cameron MacKenzie | Birkenhead United | Eastern Suburbs | Home | 4–0 | 23 April 2022 |
| 6 | Angus Kilkolly | Auckland City | Bay Olympic | Away | 0–4 | 23 April 2022 |
| 7 | Derek Tieku | Hamilton Wanderers | North Shore United | Home | 6–0 | 30 April 2022 |
| 11 | Daniel Champness | Eastern Suburbs | North Shore United | Home | 4–2 | 28 May 2022 |
| 13 | Kieran Richards | Melville United | Bay Olympic | Away | 0–5 | 12 June 2022 |
| 14 | Mohamed Awad | Manukau United | North Shore United | Home | 6–0 | 25 June 2022 |
| 15 | João Moreira | Manukau United | Bay Olympic | Away | 2–4 | 2 July 2022 |
| 16 | Emiliano Tade (Note: Player scored 4 goals) | Auckland City | North Shore United | Home | 6–0 | 16 July 2022 |
| 18 | Derek Tieku | Hamilton Wanderers | North Shore United | Away | 0–5 | 6 August 2022 |
| 20 | Matt Ellis | Auckland City | Western Springs | Away | 3–5 | 31 August 2022 |

===== Own goals =====
| Round | Player | Club | Against |
|---|---|---|---|
| 1 | Jaslin Diedericks | North Shore United | Bay Olympic |
| 1 | Joe Wallis | Western Springs | Hamilton Wanderers |
| 3 | Jackson Jarvie | Eastern Suburbs | Waiheke United |
| 6 | Roshan Calustre | Waiheke United | Melville United |
| 7 | Adam Streamer | North Shore United | Hamilton Wanderers |
| 7 | Joe Wallis (Note: Players second own goal) | Western Springs | Melville United |
| 10 | Joseph Moore | North Shore United | Melville United |
| 11 | Xavier Pratt | Hamilton Wanderers | Melville United |
| 17 | Jackson Jarvie | Eastern Suburbs | Birkenhead United |
| 18 | Sam Brotherton | Auckland City | Birkenhead United |
| 20 | Liam Anderson | Takapuna | Manukau United |
| 22 | Aaryan Raj | Eastern Suburbs | North Shore United |

=== 2022 Central League ===
Central League
- Season: 2022
- Dates: 25 March 2022 – 23 September 2022
- Champions: Wellington Olympic
- Relegated: Havelock North Wanderers
- Matches: 85
- Goals: 330 (3.88 per match)
- Top goalscorer: Hamish Watson (20)
- Biggest home win: Wellington Olympic 10–0 Havelock North Wanderers (28 May 2022)
- Biggest away win: Western Suburbs 1–11 Wellington Olympic (14 August 2022)
- Highest scoring: Western Suburbs 1–11 Wellington Olympic (14 August 2022)
- Longest winning run: 6 matches Miramar Rangers
- Longest unbeaten run: 14 matches Miramar Rangers
- Longest winless run: 8 matches Wellington United
- Longest losing run: 4 matches North Wellington and Western Suburbs
- All statistics correct as of 23 September 2022.

==== Central League teams ====
Ten teams are competing in the league – the top nine teams from the previous season and the one team promoted from the 2021 play-off between the winners of the Central Federation League and the Capital Premier. The winner of the play-off was Havelock North Wanderers. This is their first season in the Central League, since New Zealand football’s restructuring in 2021. They replaced Wainuiomata (relegated to the Capital Premier League). Wairarapa United was entered as one of the originally 10 teams to play the 2022 season but withdrew with just two weeks to go before the start of the season. They were replaced by Wellington United who had originally missed out on promotion to Havelock North Wanderers. Lower Hutt City was also replaced by Wellington Phoenix Reserves for the Central League games.

| Team | Home ground | Location | 2021 season |
|---|---|---|---|
| Havelock North Wanderers | Guthrie Park | Havelock North | 1st in Central Federation League (promoted via play-offs) |
| Miramar Rangers | David Farrington Park | Miramar, Wellington | 2nd |
| Napier City Rovers | Bluewater Stadium | Napier | 7th |
| North Wellington | Alex Moore Park | Johnsonville, Wellington | 8th |
| Petone | Memorial Park | Petone, Lower Hutt | 9th |
| Waterside Karori | Karori Park | Karori, Wellington | 6th |
| Wellington Olympic | Wakefield Park | Wellington | 1st |
| Wellington Phoenix Reserves | Fraser Park | Lower Hutt | 3rd (as Lower Hutt City) |
| Wellington United | Newtown Park | Wellington | Replaced Wairarapa United after they withdrew |
| Western Suburbs | Endeavour Park | Porirua | 4th |

==== Central League personnel and kits ====
| Team | Manager | Captain | Kit manufacturer | Shirt sponsor |
|---|---|---|---|---|
| Havelock North Wanderers | (New Zealand) Chris Greatholder | (New Zealand) Jerome Groot | Nike | None |
| Miramar Rangers | (England) Scott Hales | (New Zealand) Taylor Schrijvers | Football Central | Monsoon Poon |
| Napier City Rovers | (England) Bill Robertson | (England) Jim Hoyle | Lotto Sport Italia | Thirsty Whale |
| North Wellington | (Croatia) Davor Tavich | (Canada) Gavin Hoy | Nike | New World Newlands |
| Petone | (New Zealand) Ryan Edwards | (New Zealand) Hami Paranihi-Nuku | Football Central | Liquid |
| Waterside Karori | (New Zealand) Sam Smith | (England) Harry Fautley | Nike | Integration Works |
| Wellington Olympic | (New Zealand) Rupert Kemeys | (Cook Islands) Ben Mata | Nike | Liquid |
| Wellington Phoenix Reserves | (England) Chris Greenacre | (New Zealand) Isaac Hughes | Paladin | None |
| Wellington United | (Argentina) Guillermo Schiltenwolf | (New Zealand) Abdallah Khaled | Adidas | None |
| Western Suburbs | (New Zealand) Mark Atkinson | | Olé Football Academy | Advance Electrical Wholesalers |

==== Central League table ====
| Pos | Team | Pld | W | D | L | GF | GA | GD | Pts | Qualification |
|---|---|---|---|---|---|---|---|---|---|---|
| 1 | Wellington Olympic (C) | 18 | 14 | 3 | 1 | 71 | 15 | +56 | 45 | Winner of Central League and qualification to National League Championship |
| 2 | Miramar Rangers | 18 | 12 | 4 | 2 | 63 | 19 | +44 | 40 | Qualification to National League Championship |
| 3 | Wellington Phoenix Reserves (Note: Wellington Phoenix Reserves gain automatic entry into the National League Championship phase due to the A-League Men requirements.) | 18 | 10 | 3 | 5 | 32 | 17 | +15 | 33 | Has automatic qualification to the National League Championship |
| 4 | Napier City Rovers | 18 | 8 | 4 | 6 | 35 | 28 | +7 | 28 | Qualification to National League Championship |
| 5 | Waterside Karori | 18 | 7 | 5 | 6 | 33 | 29 | +4 | 26 | |
| 6 | Petone | 18 | 5 | 4 | 9 | 24 | 39 | −15 | 19 | |
| 7 | North Wellington | 18 | 5 | 3 | 10 | 31 | 44 | −13 | 18 | |
| 8 | Wellington United (R) | 18 | 5 | 3 | 10 | 22 | 40 | −18 | 18 | Withdrew before the 2023 season. (Note: Wellington United withdrew before the 2023 season and were replaced by Whanganui Athletic.) |
| 9 | Western Suburbs | 18 | 4 | 2 | 12 | 21 | 66 | −45 | 14 | |
| 10 | Havelock North Wanderers (R) | 18 | 3 | 3 | 12 | 21 | 56 | −35 | 12 | Relegation to Capital Premier/Central Federation League |

Source: Capital Football
Rules for classification: 1) Points; 2) Goal difference; 3) Goals scored; 4) Goals against; 5) Head to head; 6) Disciplinary record; 7) Coin toss
(C) Champions; (R) Relegated

==== Central League results table ====
| Home \ Away | HN | MR | NC | NW | PT | WK | WO | WP | WU | WS |
|---|---|---|---|---|---|---|---|---|---|---|
| Havelock North Wanderers | — | 2–3 | 0–3 | 2–3 | 2–1 | 2–2 | 1–7 | 1–1 | 1–4 | 1–1 |
| Miramar Rangers | 5–0 | — | 2–1 | 5–1 | 5–1 | 2–2 | 2–2 | 2–1 | 5–0 | 9–0 |
| Napier City Rovers | 1–0 | 1–1 | — | 2–2 | 2–2 | 2–0 | 2–5 | 2–0 | 4–0 | 3–1 |
| North Wellington | 1–4 | 1–3 | 3–2 | — | 3–1 | 2–2 | 1–2 | 0–1 | 2–2 | 5–1 |
| Petone | 2–0 | 0–5 | 2–2 | 3–1 | — | 1–2 | 1–5 | 0–3 | 1–0 | 4–0 |
| Waterside Karori | 4–1 | 3–2 | 2–1 | 1–2 | 1–1 | — | 1–1 | 1–0 | 5–1 | 1–3 |
| Wellington Olympic | 10–0 | 1–0 | 3–0 | 3–1 | 5–0 | 2–0 | — | 0–3 | 4–0 | 4–0 |
| Wellington Phoenix Reserves | 4–0 | 2–2 | 4–2 | 2–0 | 3–0 | 1–0 | 2–2 | — | 1–2 | 2–1 |
| Wellington United | 0–3 | 1–2 | 0–2 | 5–1 | 0–0 | 4–2 | 0–4 | 1–0 | — | 1–1 |
| Western Suburbs | 4–1 | 0–8 | 1–3 | 3–2 | 0–4 | 1–4 | 1–11 | 1–2 | 2–1 | — |

Source: Soccerway
Legend: Blue = home team win; Yellow = draw; Red = away team win.

==== Central League scoring ====
===== Central League top scorers =====
| Rank | Player | Club | Goals |
|---|---|---|---|
| 1 | Hamish Watson | Miramar Rangers | 20 |
| 2 | Gianni Bouzoukis | Wellington Olympic | 16 |
| 3 | Jack-Henry Sinclair | Wellington Olympic | 14 |
| 4 | Ihaia Delaney | North Wellington/Waterside Karori | 11 |
| 5 | Jesse Randall | Wellington Olympic | 10 |
| 6 | Kailan Gould | Wellington Olympic | 9 |
| 6 | Merlin Luke-Miny | Waterside Karori | 9 |
| 8 | Inigo Bronte Barea | Wellington United | 8 |
| 8 | Josh Rudland | Wellington Phoenix Reserves | 8 |
| 10 | Multiple players | | 7 |

===== Central League hat-tricks =====
| Round | Player | For | Against | Home/Away | Result | Date |
|---|---|---|---|---|---|---|
| 2 | Merlin Luke-Miny | Waterside Karori | Havelock North Wanderers | Home | 4–1 | 3 April 2022 |
| 3 | Liam Schofield | Napier City Rovers | Havelock North Wanderers | Away | 0–3 | 10 April 2022 |
| 9 | Jack-Henry Sinclair (Note: Player scored 4 goals) | Wellington Olympic | Havelock North Wanderers | Home | 10–0 | 28 May 2022 |
| 11 | Hamish Watson (Note: Player scored 5 goals) | Miramar Rangers | Western Suburbs | Home | 9–0 | 25 June 2022 |
| 14 | Gianni Bouzoukis | Wellington Olympic | Napier City Rovers | Away | 2–5 | 24 July 2022 |
| 16 | Hamish Watson | Miramar Rangers | Petone | Home | 5–1 | 13 August 2022 |
| 16 | Gianni Bouzoukis | Wellington Olympic | Western Suburbs | Away | 1–11 | 14 August 2022 |
| 17 | Inigo Bronte Barea | Wellington United | North Wellington | Home | 5–1 | 20 August 2022 |
| 18 | Jesse Randall | Wellington Olympic | Havelock North Wanderers | Away | 1–7 | 28 August 2022 |

===== Own goals =====
| Round | Player | Club | Against |
|---|---|---|---|
| 1 | Noah Tipene-Clegg | Western Suburbs | Havelock North Wanderers |
| 4 | Nicholas Yorke | Havelock North Wanderers | Miramar Rangers |
| 11 | Seth Loughran | Petone | Wellington Phoenix Reserves |
| 13 | Jack O'Connor | Western Suburbs | North Wellington |
| 14 | Luca Barclay | Havelock North Wanderers | Wellington Phoenix Reserves |
| 14 | Alex Palezevic | Wellington Olympic | Napier City Rovers |
| 17 | Ben Foxall | Havelock North Wanderers | Wellington United |
| 18 | Fetuao Belcher | Napier City Rovers | Miramar Rangers |
| 18 | James Hoyle | Napier City Rovers | Miramar Rangers |

=== 2022 Southern League ===
Southern League
- Season: 2022
- Dates: 26 March 2022 - 3 September 2022
- Champions: Christchurch United
- Relegated: Mosgiel
- Matches: 90
- Goals: 413 (4.59 per match)
- Top goalscorer: Garbhan Coughlan (24)
- Biggest home win: Cashmere Technical 11–2 Mosgiel (7 May 2022)
- Biggest away win: Nomads United 0–8 Christchurch United (23 April 2022); Mosgiel 0–8 Cashmere Technical (7 May 2022)
- Highest scoring: Cashmere Technical 11–2 Mosgiel (7 May 2022)
- Longest winning run: 11 matches Christchurch United
- Longest unbeaten run: 16 matches Christchurch United
- Longest winless run: 12 matches Mosgiel
- Longest losing run: 8 matches Green Island
- All statistics correct as of 3 September 2022.

==== Southern League teams ====
Ten teams are competing in the league, two more than in the previous season. The top five Mainland teams and two FootballSouth teams remain from the previous season, and are joined by two teams promoted from the 2021 Mainland Premier League and one team promoted from the 2021 FootballSouth Premier League. The promoted teams from Mainland are Ferrymead Bays and Nomads United, and the promoted team from FootballSouth is Mosgiel. This is all three teams' first season in the Southern League. They replaced Otago University (relegated after the debut season of the Southern League).

| Team | Home ground | Location | 2021 season |
|---|---|---|---|
| Cashmere Technical | Garrick Memorial Park | Woolston, Christchurch | 1st |
| Christchurch United | United Sports Centre | Yaldhurst, Christchurch | 5th |
| Coastal Spirit | Linfield Park | Linwood, Christchurch | 6th |
| Dunedin City Royals | Football Turf | Dunedin North | 3rd |
| Ferrymead Bays | Ferrymead Park | Ferrymead, Christchurch | 1st in Mainland Premier League (promoted) |
| Green Island | Sunnyvale Park | Green Island, Dunedin | 8th |
| Mosgiel | Memorial Park Ground | Mosgiel | 1st in FootballSouth Premier League (promoted) |
| Nelson Suburbs | Saxton Field | Nelson | 7th |
| Nomads United | Tulett Park | Casebrook, Christchurch | 2nd in Mainland Premier League (promoted) |
| Selwyn United | Foster Park | Rolleston | 2nd |

==== Southern League personnel and kits ====
| Team | Manager | Captain | Kit manufacturer | Shirt sponsor |
|---|---|---|---|---|
| Cashmere Technical | (England) Dan Schwarz | (England) Tom Schwarz | Lotto Sport Italia | None |
| Christchurch United | (Barbados) Paul Ifill | (New Zealand) Matt Tod-Smith | Healy Sportswear | Signbiz |
| Coastal Spirit | (Chile) José Matiz | (New Zealand) Michael Hogan | Adidas | Canstaff |
| Dunedin City Royals | (New Zealand) Richard Murray | (New Zealand) Jared Grove | Dynasty | None |
| Ferrymead Bays | (New Zealand) Alan Walker | (Republic of Ireland) James Deehan | Nike | D J Hewitt Builders |
| Green Island | (New Zealand) Shane Carvell | | | |
| Mosgiel | Rory Crow (New Zealand) Malcolm Fleming | (New Zealand) Rory Findlay | Adidas | None |
| Nelson Suburbs | (Northern Ireland) Ryan Stewart | (Australia) Sam Ayers | Lotto Sport Italia | Mac's Brewery |
| Nomads United | (Wales) Andrew Pitman | (New Zealand) Caleb Cottom | Nike | Greenlight Recruitment |
| Selwyn United | (New Zealand) Lee Padmore | (New Zealand) Jayden Booth | Kukri Sports | |

==== Southern League table ====
| Pos | Team | Pld | W | D | L | GF | GA | GD | Pts | Qualification |
|---|---|---|---|---|---|---|---|---|---|---|
| 1 | Christchurch United (C) | 18 | 16 | 1 | 1 | 74 | 12 | +62 | 49 | Winner of Southern League and qualification to National League Championship |
| 2 | Cashmere Technical | 18 | 16 | 1 | 1 | 79 | 20 | +59 | 49 | Qualification to National League Championship |
| 3 | Nelson Suburbs | 18 | 10 | 3 | 5 | 40 | 35 | +5 | 33 | |
| 4 | Dunedin City Royals | 18 | 10 | 1 | 7 | 46 | 35 | +11 | 31 | |
| 5 | Ferrymead Bays | 18 | 9 | 3 | 6 | 37 | 30 | +7 | 30 | |
| 6 | Coastal Spirit | 18 | 3 | 7 | 8 | 34 | 43 | −9 | 16 | |
| 7 | Nomads United | 18 | 4 | 3 | 11 | 28 | 57 | −29 | 15 | |
| 8 | Green Island | 18 | 4 | 1 | 13 | 27 | 61 | −34 | 13 | |
| 9 | Selwyn United | 18 | 2 | 5 | 11 | 27 | 48 | −21 | 11 | |
| 10 | Mosgiel (R) | 18 | 2 | 3 | 13 | 21 | 72 | −51 | 9 | Relegated to the FootballSouth Premier League/Mainland Premier League |

Source: Mainland Football
Rules for classification: 1) Points; 2) Goal difference; 3) Goals scored; 4) Goals against; 5) Head to head; 6) Disciplinary record; 7) Coin toss
(C) Champions; (R) Relegated

==== Southern League results table ====
| Home \ Away | CT | CU | CS | DC | FB | GI | MG | NS | NU | SU |
|---|---|---|---|---|---|---|---|---|---|---|
| Cashmere Technical | — | 1–0 | 3–1 | 4–2 | 1–1 | 8–0 | 11–2 | 4–1 | 9–1 | 2–1 |
| Christchurch United | 4–1 | — | 3–2 | 4–1 | 0–0 | 9–1 | 10–0 | 4–0 | 1–0 | 4–0 |
| Coastal Spirit | 0–4 | 0–4 | — | 1–0 | 1–2 | 3–2 | 2–2 | 1–1 | 0–2 | 2–2 |
| Dunedin City Royals | 4–5 | 3–4 | 3–3 | — | 2–3 | 5–0 | 2–0 | 1–0 | 5–1 | 3–2 |
| Ferrymead Bays | 0–2 | 2–3 | 2–2 | 1–3 | — | 3–2 | 4–0 | 1–2 | 4–2 | 3–0 |
| Green Island | 1–4 | 1–3 | 4–3 | 1–2 | 2–3 | — | 5–1 | 1–3 | 1–0 | 3–2 |
| Mosgiel | 0–8 | 0–4 | 0–5 | 0–2 | 1–3 | 3–1 | — | 2–4 | 5–0 | 1–1 |
| Nelson Suburbs | 1–3 | 0–5 | 2–2 | 3–0 | 3–2 | 3–1 | 3–0 | — | 2–2 | 3–2 |
| Nomads United | 0–6 | 0–8 | 3–3 | 2–4 | 1–2 | 5–0 | 3–0 | 3–5 | — | 1–0 |
| Selwyn United | 1–3 | 0–4 | 4–3 | 1–4 | 3–1 | 1–1 | 4–4 | 1–4 | 2–2 | — |

Source: Soccerway
Legend: Blue = home team win; Yellow = draw; Red = away team win.

==== Southern League scoring ====
===== Southern League top scorers =====
| Rank | Player | Club | Goals |
|---|---|---|---|
| 1 | Garbhan Coughlan | Cashmere Technical | 24 |
| 2 | Edward Wilkinson | Christchurch United | 19 |
| 3 | Lyle Matthysen | Cashmere Technical | 16 |
| 4 | Kian Donkers | Cashmere Technical | 11 |
| 4 | Sanni Issa | Christchurch United | 11 |
| 6 | En Watanabe | Dunedin City Royals | 10 |
| 7 | Declan Hickford | Nomads United | 8 |
| 7 | Ollie Petersen | Dunedin City Royals | 8 |
| 7 | Joel Peterson | Christchurch United | 8 |
| 7 | William Pierce | Ferrymead Bays / Christchurch United | 8 |
| 7 | Michael White | Ferrymead Bays | 8 |

===== Southern League hat-tricks =====
| Round | Player | For | Against | Home/Away | Result | Date |
|---|---|---|---|---|---|---|
| 3 | Lyle Matthysen | Cashmere Technical | Nomads United | Away | 0–6 | 9 April 2022 |
| 4 | Rhys Quarell | Mosgiel | Nomads United | Home | 5–0 | 16 April 2022 |
| 6 | Sanni Issa | Christchurch United | Selwyn United | Home | 4–0 | 29 April 2022 |
| 6 | En Watanabe | Dunedin City Royals | Nomads United | Home | 5–1 | 30 April 2022 |
| 7 | Garbhan Coughlan | Cashmere Technical | Mosgiel | Home | 11–2 | 7 May 2022 |
| 8 | Ryan Fleming | Dunedin City Royals | Green Island | Home | 5–0 | 21 May 2022 |
| 11 | Michael White | Ferrymead Bays | Mosgiel | Home | 4–0 | 25 June 2022 |
| 12 | Garbhan Coughlan (Note: Player scored 5 goals) | Cashmere Technical | Nomads United | Home | 9–1 | 2 July 2022 |
| 16 | Garbhan Coughlan | Cashmere Technical | Mosgiel | Away | 0–8 | 13 August 2022 |
| 16 | Edward Wilkinson (Note: Player scored 4 goals) | Christchurch United | Green Island | Home | 9–1 | 13 August 2022 |
| 17 | Daniel Thoms | Nomads United | Nelson Suburbs | Home | 3–5 | 20 August 2022 |
| 17 | Treye Butler | Coastal Spirit | Mosgiel | Away | 0–5 | 20 August 2022 |
| 18 | Connor Neil | Dunedin City Royals | Cashmere Technical | Home | 4–5 | 27 August 2022 |

===== Own goals =====
| Round | Player | Club | Against |
|---|---|---|---|
| 1 | Dominic McGarr | Coastal Spirit | Christchurch United |
| 2 | Riley Caswell | Nomads United | Green Island |
| 4 | Yaquub Abdi | Nomads United | Mosgiel |
| 4 | Jared Grove | Dunedin City Royals | Ferrymeads Bay |
| 4 | Jake Hodder | Coastal Spirit | Green Island |
| 4 | Luke Pennington | Coastal Spirit | Green Island |
| 9 | Cameron McPhail | Mosgiel | Christchurch United |
| 13 | Jack Walecki | Mosgiel | Nomads United |
| 16 | Christian Firth | Green Island | Christchurch United |
| 17 | Guy Reeves | Nomads United | Nelson Suburbs |
| 17 | Benjamin Taylor | Mosgiel | Coastal Spirit |
| 18 | Rory Findlay | Mosgiel | Christchurch United |

== Qualified clubs ==
There are 10 men’s National League Championship qualifying spots (4 for the Northern League, 3 plus Wellington Phoenix Reserves for the Central League and 2 for the Southern League).

Location of clubs in Auckland Region for the 2022 National League season
Location of clubs in Wellington Region for the 2022 National League season

| Association | Team | Position in Regional League | App (last) | Previous best (last) |
|---|---|---|---|---|
| Northern League (4 berths) | Auckland City | 1st | 1st (Note: Debut under new competition but played National League before in the New Zealand Football Championship, also qualified last year but did not take part) | Debut (Note: Previously won the National League when playing in the New Zealand Football Championship) |
| Northern League (4 berths) | Birkenhead United | 2nd | 1st | Debut |
| Northern League (4 berths) | Auckland United | 3rd | 1st | Debut |
| Northern League (4 berths) | Melville United | 4th | 1st (Note: Debut under new competition but played National League before in the National Summer Soccer League) | Debut (Note: Previous best was 7th in the National Summer Soccer League) |
| Central League (3 berths) | Wellington Olympic | 1st | 1st | Debut |
| Central League (3 berths) | Miramar Rangers | 2nd | 1st (Note: Debut under new competition but played National League before in the New Zealand National Soccer League) | Debut |
| Central League (3 berths) | Napier City Rovers | 4th (Note: Wellington Phoenix Reserves finished third but have automatic qualification.) | 1st | Debut (Note: Previously won the National League when playing in the New Zealand National Soccer League) |
| Southern League (2 berths) | Christchurch United | 1st | 1st | Debut |
| Southern League (2 berths) | Cashmere Technical | 2nd | 1st | Debut |
| Wellington Phoenix (automatic berth) | Wellington Phoenix Reserves | Automatic qualification | 1st (Note: Debut under the new competition, but played the National League before as part of the New Zealand Football Championship) | Debut |

== Championship phase ==
=== League table ===
| Pos | Team | Pld | W | D | L | GF | GA | GD | Pts | Qualification |
|---|---|---|---|---|---|---|---|---|---|---|
| 1 | Auckland City (C) | 9 | 7 | 1 | 1 | 20 | 9 | +11 | 22 (Note: Head-to-head points: Auckland City 3, Wellington Olympic 0.) | Qualification to Grand Final and Champions League national play-offs |
| 2 | Wellington Olympic | 9 | 7 | 1 | 1 | 30 | 8 | +22 | 22 | Qualification to Grand Final and Champions League national play-offs |
| 3 | Auckland United | 9 | 5 | 2 | 2 | 14 | 13 | +1 | 17 | |
| 4 | Birkenhead United | 9 | 4 | 2 | 3 | 19 | 17 | +2 | 14 | |
| 5 | Melville United | 9 | 4 | 1 | 4 | 16 | 18 | −2 | 13 | |
| 6 | Wellington Phoenix Reserves (Note: Wellington Phoenix Reserves can not qualify for the Grand Final.) | 9 | 3 | 3 | 3 | 16 | 14 | +2 | 12 (Note: Head-to-head points: Wellington Phoenix Reserves 3, Cashmere Technical 0.) | |
| 7 | Cashmere Technical | 9 | 4 | 0 | 5 | 19 | 18 | +1 | 12 | |
| 8 | Napier City Rovers | 9 | 1 | 3 | 5 | 14 | 23 | −9 | 6 | |
| 9 | Christchurch United | 9 | 1 | 2 | 6 | 12 | 26 | −14 | 5 | |
| 10 | Miramar Rangers | 9 | 1 | 1 | 7 | 11 | 25 | −14 | 4 | |

Source: New Zealand Football
Rules for classification: 1) Points; 2) Head to head; 3) Head to Head goal difference; 4) Goal difference; 5) Goals for
(C) Champions
Notes:
- Christchurch United won 4–1 in Round 9, but fielded an ineligible player. Result overturned to a 3–0 win for Cashmere Technical.

=== Results table ===
| Home \ Away | AC | AU | BU | CT | CU | MEL | MR | NR | WO | WP |
|---|---|---|---|---|---|---|---|---|---|---|
| Auckland City | | | | 2–0 | | 2–0 | 2–1 | 3–0 | | 2–0 |
| Auckland United | 3–2 | | | 2–1 | 1–1 | 1–0 | | 3–2 | | |
| Birkenhead United | 2–2 | 2–0 | | 5–3 | 3–1 | | | | | |
| Cashmere Technical | | | | | | | 4–0 | 4–2 | 0–3 | 1–3 |
| Christchurch United | 2–3 | | | 0–3 (Note: Christchurch United won 4–1 in Round 9, but fielded an ineligible player. Result overturned to a 3–0 win for Cashmere Technical.) | | 2–5 | | 1–1 | | 1–3 |
| Melville United | | | 2–0 | 1–3 | | | | 4–3 | 0–4 | |
| Miramar Rangers | | 0–1 | 2–4 | | 0–3 | 2–3 | | | 1–4 | |
| Napier City Rovers | | | 1–1 | | | | 2–2 | | 2–5 | 1–0 |
| Wellington Olympic | 1–2 | 3–1 | 2–0 | | 7–1 | | | | | |
| Wellington Phoenix Reserves | | 2–2 | 4–2 | | | 1–1 | 2–3 | | 1–1 | |

Source: New Zealand Football
Legend: Blue = home team win; Yellow = draw; Red = away team win.

==== Positions by round ====
The table lists the positions of teams after each week of matches. To preserve chronological evolvements, any postponed matches are not included in the round at which they were originally scheduled, but added to the full round they were played immediately afterwards. For example, if a match is scheduled for round 3, but then postponed and played between rounds 6 and 7, it is added to the standings for round 6.

| Team ╲ Round | 1 | 2 | 3 | 4 | 5 | 6 | 7 | 8 | 9 |
|---|---|---|---|---|---|---|---|---|---|
| Auckland City | 3 | 2 | 2 | 1 | 3 | 2 | 1 | 1 | 1 |
| Wellington Olympic | 6 | 5 | 3 | 2 | 1 | 1 | 2 | 2 | 2 |
| Auckland United | 4 | 3 | 4 | 3 | 2 | 3 | 3 | 4 | 3 |
| Birkenhead United | 2 | 1 | 1 | 4 | 4 | 4 | 4 | 3 | 4 |
| Melville United | 7 | 9 | 9 | 10 | 8 | 6 | 5 | 5 | 5 |
| Wellington Phoenix Reserves | 7 | 7 | 7 | 7 | 7 | 8 | 8 | 6 | 6 |
| Cashmere Technical | 1 | 6 | 6 | 5 | 5 | 5 | 6 | 7 | 7 |
| Napier City Rovers | 4 | 4 | 5 | 6 | 6 | 7 | 7 | 8 | 8 |
| Christchurch United | 9 | 8 | 8 | 8 | 10 | 9 | 9 | 9 | 9 |
| Miramar Rangers | 10 | 10 | 10 | 9 | 9 | 10 | 10 | 10 | 10 |

| Leader and Grand Final |
| Grand Final |

Source: New Zealand Football

=== Grand Final ===
Sunday, 4 December 2022
14:00 NZDT

| Auckland City | 3–2 | Wellington Olympic |
|---|---|---|
| Gillion 33'; Garriga 40'; Kilkolly 88' | Report | Davenport-Petersen 77'; Mata 90+1' (pen.) |

Mt Smart Stadium, Auckland
Referee: Calvin-kei Berg

== Statistics ==
=== Top scorers ===
| Rank | Player | Club | Goals |
|---|---|---|---|
| 1 | (New Zealand) Gianni Bouzoukis | Wellington Olympic | 9 |
| 1 | (Republic of Ireland) Garbhan Coughlan | Cashmere Technical | 9 |
| 3 | (New Zealand) Jesse Randall | Wellington Olympic | 7 |
| 4 | (New Zealand) Oliver Colloty | Melville United | 6 |
| 5 | (England) Sam Mason-Smith | Miramar Rangers | 5 |
| 5 | (New Zealand) Dane Schnell | Birkenhead United | 5 |
| 5 | (New Zealand) Jack-Henry Sinclair | Wellington Olympic | 5 |
| 5 | (Argentina) Emiliano Tade | Auckland City | 5 |
| 9 | (New Zealand) Luke Jorgensen | Birkenhead United | 4 |
| 9 | (New Zealand) Ryen Lawrence | Melville United | 4 |
| 9 | (New Zealand) Nicolas Zambrano | Auckland United | 4 |

==== Hat-tricks ====
| Round | Player | For | Against | Home/Away | Result | Date |
|---|---|---|---|---|---|---|
| 5 | (New Zealand) Dane Schnell | Birkenhead United | Cashmere Technical | Home | 5–3 | 30 October 2022 |
| 6 | (Republic of Ireland) Garbhan Coughlan | Cashmere Technical | Napier City Rovers | Home | 4–2 | 5 November 2022 |
| 8 | (New Zealand) Jesse Randall | Wellington Olympic | Christchurch United | Home | 7–1 | 19 November 2022 |

== Awards ==
=== Goal of the Week ===
Goal of the Week
| Week | Player | Club | Ref. |
|---|---|---|---|
| 1 | (New Zealand) Andrew Storer | Cashmere Technical | |
| 2 | (England) Kailan Gould | Wellington Olympic | |
| 3 | (New Zealand) Sam Burfoot | Birkenhead United | |
| 4 | (New Zealand) Joseph Lee | Auckland City | |
| 5 | (England) Sam Mason-Smith | Miramar Rangers | |

=== Team of the Month ===
Team of the Month
| Month | Goalkeeper | Defenders | Midfielders | Forwards |
|---|---|---|---|---|
| October | (New Zealand) Scott Basalaj (WO) | (England) Liam Schofield (NR) (New Zealand) Sam Brotherton (AC) (New Zealand) Dino Botica (BU) (New Zealand) Jack-Henry Sinclair (WO) | (New Zealand) Michael den Heijer (AU) (New Zealand) Cam Howieson (AC) (New Zealand) Dan McKay (WP) | (New Zealand) Jesse Randall (WO) (New Zealand) Gianni Bouzoukis (WO) (South Africa) Lyle Matthysen (CT) |

=== Annual awards ===
| League | MVP | Club | Top scorer | Club |
|---|---|---|---|---|
| Northern League | (Ghana) Derek Tieku | Hamilton Wanderers | (Ghana) Derek Tieku | Hamilton Wanderers |
| Central League | (England) Jonathan McNamara | Napier City Rovers | (New Zealand) Hamish Watson | Miramar Rangers |
| Southern League | (New Zealand) Cameron Anderson | Green Island | (Republic of Ireland) Garbhan Coughlan | Cashmere Technical |
| National League | (Croatia) Silvio Rodić | Birkenhead United | (New Zealand) Gianni Bouzoukis (Republic of Ireland) Garbhan Coughlan | Wellington Olympic; Cashmere Technical |

Team of the season
| Goalkeeper | (Croatia) Silvio Rodić (Birkenhead United) | | | |
| Defenders | (New Zealand) Dino Botica (Birkenhead United) | | (Cook Islands) Ben Mata (Wellington Olympic) | (New Zealand) Sam Brotherton (Auckland City) |
| Midfielders | (New Zealand) Jack-Henry Sinclair (Wellington Olympic) | (New Zealand) Cameron Howieson (Auckland City) | (Spain) Gerard Garriga (Auckland City) | (New Zealand) Noah Karunaratne (Wellington Phoenix Reserves) |
| Forwards | (New Zealand) Gianni Bouzoukis (Wellington Olympic) | | (Republic of Ireland) Garbhan Coughlan (Cashmere Technical) | (New Zealand) Oliver Colloty (Melville United) |
