= National Summer Soccer League =

The National Summer Soccer League was a brief national association football league competition in New Zealand which persisted from 1996 to 1998. It succeeded the Superclub competition and was itself succeeded by the second incarnation of the New Zealand National Soccer League.

== Background ==
The former New Zealand National Soccer League, which spanned from 1970 to 1992, had faced several financial issues during its existence, primarily travel expenses associated with teams partaking in a nationwide tournament. In order to mitigate travel expenses, the national tournament was replaced by a regional tournament; the winning teams in each region then competed in a shorter national tournament (the Superclub competition). However, this tournament also had drawbacks of its own, specifically the dilution of playing standard caused by the inclusion of more amateur teams in each region. After just three seasons of the Superclub competition, it was scrapped and ultimately replaced by a new competition, the National Summer Soccer League.

The new league included invited teams, rather than featuring the traditional promotion and relegation system. Selection criteria for these teams involved the financial strength of the club and its location. The league also featured a championship play-off session at the end of the seasons, involving teams finishing high in the table. The new competition was played during the summer months, with the 1996 season running from January to May and subsequent seasons running from November to March (the season being named for the year in which the final took place).

== Format ==
Ten teams competed in the 1996 and 1997 seasons; eleven took part in the 1998 campaign. The competition operated as a round-robin league, with each team playing every other team twice, once at each team's home ground. The top teams at the end of this league section would then qualify for a play-off series culminating in a final. In the first two seasons, the top two league sides would play each other, with the winner of that match advancing directly to the final. The loser would play the winner of a match between third- and fourth-placed sides. The winner of that tie would then qualify as the other finalist. In the 1998 season this process was simplified, with the final taking place between the first-placed side at the end of the league section of the season and the winner of a match between the second- and third-placed sides.

For the first two seasons in which the competition operated, a unique system of awarding points was used, though this was scrapped at the end of the 1997 season to be replaced by the traditional 3-1-0 system. In the 1996 and 1997 seasons, teams were awarded four points for a win and one for a draw. In drawn matches, a penalty shoot-out (three shots per side) would then take place, with the winning side awarded a bonus point.

== Champions ==
Two different sides won the competition during its three years of existence. Both had previously won the New Zealand National Soccer League.

Year	League size	Matches per team	Winners	Runners-up
1996	10	18	Waitakere City	Miramar Rangers
1997	10	18	Waitakere City	Napier City Rovers
1998	11	20	Napier City Rovers	Central United
