= 2021 New Zealand Women's National League =

Football Championship

New Zealand National League
- Season: 2021
- Dates: 6 November 2021 – 11 December 2021
- Champions: Cancelled

The 2021 New Zealand Women's National League was the first scheduled season of the new National League since its restructuring in 2021. It was the nineteenth scheduled season of national women's football and was planned as a hybrid season, with four teams from the NRFL Premier League representing the Northern Conference, Central Football and Capital Football representing the Central Conference, and Canterbury United Pride and Southern United representing the Southern Conference.

New Zealand Football announced on the 14 September that they had decided to terminate the remainder of the Northern League season and cancel any yet to be played fixtures due to COVID-19 and Auckland being in Level 4. The decision was made because they couldn't complete all the games before Championship phase was due to begin.

On the 2 November, after confirmation that the alert levels would not change to allow the Auckland and Waikato teams to play any further part in the National Competition, New Zealand Football announced that they were cancelling the remainder of the National League. In its place, they instead decided on a one-off interregional competition, the National League: South Central Series.

== Qualifying league ==
=== 2021 NRFL Premier League ===
==== Teams ====
Team	Location	Home Ground
Auckland United	Mount Roskill, Auckland	Keith Hay Park
Eastern Suburbs	Kohimarama, Auckland	Madills Farm
Ellerslie	Ellerslie, Auckland	Michaels Avenue Reserve
Hamilton Wanderers	Chartwell, Hamilton	Porritt Stadium
Northern Rovers	Glenfield, Auckland	McFetridge Park
Western Springs	Westmere, Auckland	Seddon Fields

==== NRFL Premier League table ====
Pos	Team	Pld	W	D	L	GF	GA	GD	Pts	Qualification
1	Eastern Suburbs (C)	18	12	2	4	41	28	+13	38	Winner of Northern League and qualification to National League Championship
2	Western Springs (Q)	18	11	1	6	36	29	+7	34	Qualification to National League Championship
3	Northern Rovers (Q)	18	7	6	5	42	40	+2	27	Qualification to National League Championship
4	Hamilton Wanderers (Q)	18	7	3	8	32	31	+1	24	Qualification to National League Championship
5	Ellerslie	18	4	5	9	28	32	−4	17	
6	Auckland United	18	3	3	12	19	38	−19	12	

Updated to match(es) played on 15 August 2021. Source: Northern Region Football
Rules for classification: 1) Points; 2) Goal difference; 3) Goals scored; 4) Goals against; 5) Head to head; 6) Disciplinary record; 7) Coin toss
(C) Champions; (Q) Qualified for the phase indicated
- League completed early with two rounds remaining due to COVID-19 and Auckland being in Level 4.
- There was no relegation with the league expanding to eight teams instead for 2022.

==== NRFL Premier League results table ====
Home \ Away	AU	ES	EL	HW	NR	WS
Auckland United	—	1–1	1–3	1–2	2–3	3–0
Auckland United	—	1–3	0–3	0–6	—	0–3
Eastern Suburbs	3–1	—	3–1	3–2	2–4	1–4
Eastern Suburbs	—	—	5–2	4–1	4–0	2–1
Ellerslie	2–2	0–1	—	1–1	2–3	0–2
Ellerslie	0–0	—	—	0–1	2–2	—
Hamilton Wanderers	1–3	1–3	2–1	—	1–3	1–3
Hamilton Wanderers	2–1	0–1	2–1	—	—	—
Northern Rovers	0–1	1–1	1–3	3–3	—	3–3
Northern Rovers	3–1	4–1	4–4	1–1	—	6–2
Western Springs	1–0	3–0	1–0	2–1	4–1	—
Western Springs	2–1	1–3	1–3	0–4	3–0	—

Updated to match(es) played on 15 August 2021. Source: Northern Region Football
Legend: Blue = home team win; Yellow = draw; Red = away team win.

== Qualified teams ==
Locations of the 2021 National League Teams

Association	Team	Position in Regional League	App (last)	Previous best (last)
Northern League (4 berths)	Eastern Suburbs	1st	1st	Debut
Northern League (4 berths)	Western Springs	2nd	1st	Debut
Northern League (4 berths)	Northern Rovers	3rd	1st	Debut
Northern League (4 berths)	Hamilton Wanderers	4th	1st	Debut
Central League (2 berths)	Central Football	N/A	19th (2020)	2nd (2004)
Central League (2 berths)	Capital Football	N/A	19th (2020)	1st (2010)
Southern League (2 berths)	Canterbury United Pride	N/A	19th (2020)	1st (2020)
Southern League (2 berths)	Southern United	N/A	19th (2020)	3rd (2017)

== Championship phase ==
=== South Central Series ===
New Zealand National League: South Central Series
- Season: 2021
- Dates: 6 November 2021 – 11 December 2021
- Champions: Southern United
- Matches: 12
- Goals: 49 (4.08 per match)
- Best player: Annalie Longo
- Top goalscorer: Annalie Longo (7 goals)
- Biggest home win: Canterbury United Pride 5–0 Central Football (21 November 2021); Capital Football 5–0 Central Football (11 December 2021)
- Biggest away win: Central Football 0–5 Canterbury United Pride (28 November 2021)
- Highest scoring: Southern United 5–3 Canterbury United Pride (11 December 2021)
- All statistics correct as of 11 December 2021.

With confirmation that the alert levels were not changing to a level that would allow Auckland and Waikato teams to play in the National Competition, New Zealand Football announced that they were cancelling this seasons National League. In its place, they instead decided on a one-off interregional competition, the National League: South Central Series.

==== South Central table ====
Pos	Team	Pld	W	D	L	GF	GA	GD	Pts	Qualification
1	Southern United (C)	6	5	0	1	14	9	+5	15	Winner of South Central Series
2	Capital Football	6	4	0	2	15	5	+10	12	
3	Canterbury United Pride	6	3	0	3	18	12	+6	9	
4	Central Football	6	0	0	6	2	23	−21	0	

Updated to match(es) played on 11 December 2021. Source: New Zealand Football
Rules for classification: 1) Points; 2) Goal difference; 3) Goals scored; 4) Goals against; 5) Head to head; 6) Disciplinary record; 7) Coin toss
(C) Champions

==== South Central results table ====
Home \ Away	CU	CAP	CEN	SU
Canterbury United Pride		3–2	5–0	1–2
Capital Football	3–1		5–0	0–1
Central Football	0–5	0–2		1–3
Southern United	5–3	0–3	3–1	

Updated to match(es) played on 11 December 2021. Source: New Zealand Football
Legend: Blue = home team win; Yellow = draw; Red = away team win.

===== South Central positions by round =====
The table lists the positions of teams after each week of matches. To preserve chronological evolvements, any postponed matches are not included in the round at which they were originally scheduled, but added to the full round they were played immediately afterwards. For example, if a match is scheduled for round 13, but then postponed and played between rounds 16 and 17, it is added to the standings for round 16.

Team ╲ Round	1	2	3	4	5	6
Southern United	2	2	1	2	1	1
Capital Football	1	1	2	1	3	2
Canterbury United Pride	3	3	3	3	2	3
Central Football	4	4	4	4	4	4

Leader

Updated to match(es) played on 11 December 2021. Source: New Zealand Football

== Statistics ==
As of 11 December 2021

=== Top scorers ===
Rank	Player	Club	Goals
1	Annalie Longo	Canterbury United Pride	7
2	Kaley Ward	Capital Football	5
3	Amy Hislop	Southern United	4
4	Rebecca Lake	Canterbury United Pride	3
4	Pepi Olliver-Bell	Capital Football	3
4	Chelsea Whittaker	Southern United	3
7	Kiara Bercelli	Canterbury United Pride	2
7	Margarida Dias	Southern United	2
7	Kate Guildford	Canterbury United Pride	2
7	Kate Loye	Canterbury United Pride	2
7	Jemma Robertson	Capital Football	2

=== Hat-tricks ===
Round	Player	For	Against	Home/Away	Result	Date
6	Chelsea Whittaker	Southern United	Canterbury United Pride	Home	5–3	11 December 2021

=== Own goals ===
Round	Player	Club	Against
1	Devyn Crawford	Central Football	Capital Football
2	Devyn Crawford	Central Football	Southern United
6	Lara Wall	Canterbury United Pride	Southern United
