= 1996–97 National Summer Soccer League =

The 1997 National Summer Soccer League was the second season of a short-lived nationwide association football club competition in New Zealand. Despite being known as the 1997 league, competition started in November 1996, with the later rounds and final playoffs held in 1997. The competition was won by Waitakere City.

== Structure ==
The league was an invitation-only competition, with no promotion or relegation taking place. Matches took place between November 1996 and April 1997, with a three-week break from late December to mid-January. The competition was divided into two stages. In the first stage the ten teams took part in a round-robin league, with each team playing every other team home and away. 1996 participants Waikato United were replaced by new team Melville United, which had been formed from a merger of Waikato United and Melville AFC.

The top four teams from this stage progressed to a play-off series. This involved the top two teams from the league phase playing each other, and third and fourth place also playing each other. The winner of the match between first and second progressed through to the final; the loser of that match met the winner of the other match to decide the other finalist.

A unique system of awarding points was used for this competition. Teams were awarded four points for a win and one for a draw. In drawn matches, a penalty shoot-out (minimum of three shots per side) would then take place, with the winning side awarded a bonus point. This system was abandoned at the end of the season; the 1998 league was played using the traditional system of three points for a win, one for a draw, and none for a loss, with no penalty shoot-outs.

== League stage ==
=== League table ===
Pos	Team	Pld	W	D	L	GF	GA	GD	BP	Pts	Qualification
1	Napier City Rovers	18	12	2	4	42	18	+24	0	50	1997 National Soccer League Finals
2	Central United	18	12	1	5	47	26	+21	1	50	1997 National Soccer League Finals
3	Waitakere City (C)	18	10	2	6	39	21	+18	1	43	1996–97 National Soccer League Champions
4	North Shore United	18	9	4	5	40	29	+11	3	43	1997 National Soccer League Finals
5	Miramar Rangers	18	8	6	4	35	26	+9	4	42	
6	Nelson Suburbs	18	9	0	9	25	33	−8	0	36	
7	Melville United	18	5	3	10	31	43	−12	2	25	
8	Wellington United (R)	18	5	5	8	31	46	−15	0	25	Team withdrew
9	Woolston WMC	18	3	3	12	17	39	−22	2	17	
10	Mount Maunganui (R)	18	1	6	11	14	40	−26	3	13	Team withdrew

Rules for classification: 1) points; 2) goal difference; 3) number of goals scored.
(C) Champions; (R) Relegated

== Finals ==
=== Playoffs ===
22 March 1997

Napier City Rovers	3 – 0	Central United
New, Ryan, Christie

Park Island, Napier
22 March 1997

Waitakere City	2 – 1	North Shore United
Gray × 2'		Stevens

Auckland

28 March 1997

Central United	1 – 3	Waitakere City
de Jong		K Smith, Viljoen, Laus

Auckland

=== Final ===
6 April 1997

Napier City Rovers	1 – 3	Waitakere City
Goodacre		Viljoen, McClennan, Gray

Bill McKinlay Park, Auckland

== Records and statistics ==
Top scorers

- Tim Stevens (North Shore United), 14 goals
- Mark Elrick (Central United), 13 goals
- Martin Akers (Napier City Rovers), 12 goals
- Justin Fashanu (Miramar Rangers), 12 goals
- Stephen Mack (Central United), 12 goals

Biggest winning margin

- Waitakere City 8, Wellington United 1

Highest aggregate score

- Miramar Rangers 3, Central United 7
