= Lortie =

Lortie is a French surname. Notable people with the surname include:

- Andrew Lortie, French theologian
- Bernard Lortie (born c. 1951), Canadian terrorist
- Denis Lortie (born 1959), Canadian spree killer
- Joseph Arthur Lortie (1869–1958), Canadian physician
- Léon Lortie (1902–1985), Canadian chemist
- Louis Lortie (born 1959), Canadian pianist
- Marc Lortie (born 1948), Canadian diplomat
