= Huguenots =

Historical religious group of French Protestants

The Huguenots (/ˈhjuːɡənɒts/ HEW-gə-nots, UK also /-noʊz/ -nohz; French: [yɡ(ə)no]) are a religious group of French Protestants who held to the Reformed (Calvinist) tradition of Protestantism. The term was in common use by around 1550 and may be derived from the name of burgomaster Besançon Hugues, who defended Geneva from Catholic Savoy. Huguenot was frequently used in reference to those of the Reformed Church of France from the time of the Protestant Reformation. By contrast, the Protestant populations of eastern France, in Alsace, Moselle, and Montbéliard, were mainly Lutherans.

In his Encyclopedia of Protestantism, Hans Hillerbrand wrote that on the eve of the St. Bartholomew's Day massacre in 1572, the Huguenot community made up as much as 10% of the French population. By 1600, it declined to 7–8%, and was further reduced later in the century after the return of persecution under Louis XIV, who instituted the Dragonnades to forcibly convert Protestants, and then finally revoked all Protestant rights in his Edict of Fontainebleau of 1685. In 1686, Protestants comprised just 1% of the population.

The Huguenots were concentrated in the southern and western parts of the Kingdom of France. As Huguenots gained influence and more openly displayed their faith, Catholic hostility grew. A series of religious conflicts followed, known as the French Wars of Religion, fought intermittently from 1562 to 1598. The Huguenots were led by Jeanne d'Albret; her son, the future Henry IV (who would later convert to Catholicism in order to become king); and the princes of Condé. The wars ended with the Edict of Nantes of 1598, which granted the Huguenots substantial religious, political, and military autonomy.

Huguenot rebellions in the 1620s resulted in the abolition of their political and military privileges. They retained the religious provisions of the Edict of Nantes until the rule of Louis XIV, who gradually increased persecution of Protestantism until he issued the Edict of Fontainebleau (1685). This ended legal recognition of Protestantism in France and the Huguenots were subject to violent Dragonnades, forced to either convert to Catholicism (possibly as Nicodemites) or flee as refugees. Louis XIV claimed the French Huguenot population was reduced from about 900,000 or 800,000 adherents to just 1,000 or 1,500. He exaggerated the decline, but the Dragonnades were devastating for the French Protestant community. The exodus of Huguenots from France created a brain drain, as many of them had occupied important places in society.

The remaining Huguenots faced continued persecution under Louis XV. By the time of his death in 1774, Calvinism had been all but eliminated from France. Persecution of Protestants officially ended with the Edict of Versailles, signed by Louis XVI in 1787. Two years later, with the Revolutionary Declaration of the Rights of Man and of the Citizen of 1789, Protestants gained equal rights as citizens. The Reformed Church of France represented the main continuation of the Huguenot tradition in modern France. In 2013, it merged with the Evangelical Lutheran Church in France to form the United Protestant Church of France, which today represents the largest Protestant denomination in France and includes both Reformed (Calvinist) and Lutheran traditions descended in part from the Huguenots.

== Etymology ==
Huguenot cross

A term used originally in derision, Huguenot has unclear origins. Various hypotheses have been promoted. The term may have been a combined reference to the Swiss politician Besançon Hugues (died 1532) and the religiously conflicted nature of Swiss republicanism in his time. It used a derogatory pun on the name Hugues by way of the Dutch word Huisgenoten (literally "housemates"), referring to the connotations of a somewhat related word in German Eidgenosse ('Confederate' in the sense of 'a citizen of one of the states of the Swiss Confederacy').

In Geneva, John Calvin's adopted home and the centre of the Calvinist movement, Hugues, though Catholic, was a leader of the "Confederate Party", so called because it favoured independence from the Duke of Savoy. It sought an alliance between the city-state of Geneva and the Swiss Confederation. The label Huguenot was purportedly first applied in France to those conspirators (all of them aristocratic members of the Reformed Church) who were involved in the Amboise plot of 1560: a foiled attempt to wrest power in France from the influential and zealously Catholic House of Guise. This action would have fostered relations with the Swiss.

O. I. A. Roche promoted this idea among historians. He wrote in his book, The Days of the Upright, A History of the Huguenots (1965), that Huguenot is:

a combination of a Dutch and a German word. In the Dutch-speaking North of France, Bible students who gathered in each other's houses to study secretly were called Huis Genooten ("housemates") while on the Swiss and German borders they were termed Eid Genossen, or "oath fellows", that is, persons bound to each other by an oath. Gallicised into Huguenot, often used deprecatingly, the word became, during two and a half centuries of terror and triumph, a badge of enduring honour and courage.

Some disagree with such non-French linguistic origins. Janet Gray argues that for the word to have spread into common use in France, it must have originated there in French. The "Hugues hypothesis" argues that the name was derived by association with Hugues Capet, king of France, who reigned long before the Reformation. He was regarded by the Gallicians as a noble man who respected people's dignity and lives. Janet Gray and other supporters of the hypothesis suggest that the name huguenote would be roughly equivalent to "little Hugos", or "those who want Hugo".

Paul Ristelhuber, in his 1879 introduction to a new edition of the controversial and censored, but popular 1566 work Apologie pour Hérodote, by Henri Estienne, mentions these theories and opinions, but tends to support a completely Catholic origin. As one legend holds, a gateway area in the streets of Tours was haunted by the ghosts of le roi Huguet (a generic term for these spirits), "because they were wont to assemble near the gate named after Hugon, a Count of Tours in ancient times, who had left a record of evil deeds and had become in popular fancy a sort of sinister and maleficent genius. This count may have been Hugh of Tours, who was disliked for his cowardice. Additionally, it is related that it was believed that these spirits, instead of spending their time in Purgatory, came back to rattle doors and haunt and harm people at night. Protestants went out at night to their lascivious conventicles, and so the priests and the people began to call them Huguenots in Tours and then elsewhere." The name, Huguenot, "the people applied in hatred and derision to those who were elsewhere called Lutherans, and from Touraine it spread throughout France." The prétendus réformés ("supposedly reformed") were said to gather at night at Tours, both for political purposes and for prayer and singing psalms. Reguier de la Plancha (d. 1560) in his De l'Estat de France offered the following account as to the origin of the name, as cited by The Cape Monthly:

Reguier de la Plancha accounts for it [the name] as follows: "The name huguenand was given to those of the religion during the affair of Amboyse, and they were to retain it ever since. I'll say a word about it to settle the doubts of those who have strayed in seeking its origin. The superstition of our ancestors, to within twenty or thirty years thereabouts, was such that in almost all the towns in the kingdom they had a notion that certain spirits underwent their Purgatory in this world after death, and that they went about the town at night, striking and outraging many people whom they found in the streets. But the light of the Gospel has made them vanish, and teaches us that these spirits were street-strollers and ruffians. In Paris the spirit was called le moine bourré; at Orléans, le mulet odet; at Blois le loup garon; at Tours, le Roy Huguet; and so on in other places. Now, it happens that those whom they called Lutherans were at that time so narrowly watched during the day that they were forced to wait till night to assemble, for the purpose of praying God, for preaching and receiving the Holy Sacrament; so that although they did not frighten nor hurt anybody, the priests, through mockery, made them the successors of those spirits which roam the night; and thus that name being quite common in the mouth of the populace, to designate the evangelical huguenands in the country of Tourraine and Amboyse, it became in vogue after that enterprise."

Some have suggested the name was derived, with intended scorn, from les guenon de Hus (the "monkeys" or "apes of Jan Hus"). By 1911, there was still no consensus in the United States on this interpretation.

== Symbol ==
The Huguenot cross

The Huguenot cross is the distinctive emblem of the Huguenots (croix huguenote). It is now an official symbol of the Église des Protestants réformés (French Protestant church). Huguenot descendants sometimes display this symbol as a sign of reconnaissance (recognition) between them.

== Demographics ==
Religious geopolitics between 1520 and 1685 on a map of modern France. Controlled by Huguenot nobility Contested between Huguenots and Catholics Controlled by Catholic nobility Lutheran-majority area

The issue of demographic strength and geographical spread of the Reformed tradition in France has been covered in a variety of sources. Most of them agree that the Huguenot population reached as many as 10% of the total population, or roughly 2 million people, on the eve of the St. Bartholomew's Day massacre in 1572.

=== Links to nobility ===
The new teaching of John Calvin attracted sizeable portions of the nobility and urban bourgeoisie. After John Calvin introduced the Reformation in France, the number of French Protestants steadily swelled to ten percent of the population, or roughly 1.8 million people, in the decade between 1560 and 1570. During the same period, there were some 1,400 Reformed churches operating in France. Hans J. Hillerbrand, an expert on the subject, in his Encyclopedia of Protestantism: 4-volume Set claims the Huguenot community reached as much as 10% of the French population on the eve of the St. Bartholomew's Day massacre in 1572, declining to 7–8% by around 1600, and further after heavy persecution began once again with the Revocation of the Edict of Nantes by Louis XIV in 1685. Among the nobles, Calvinism peaked on the eve of the St. Bartholomew's Day massacre. Since then, it sharply decreased as the Huguenots were no longer tolerated by both the French royalty and the Catholic masses. By around 1600, Huguenots constituted 7–8% of the whole population, or 1.2 million people. By the time Louis XIV revoked the Edict of Nantes in 1685, Huguenots accounted for 800,000 to 1 million people.

Huguenots controlled sizeable areas in southern and western France. In addition, many areas, especially in the central part of the country, were also contested between the French Reformed and Catholic nobles. Demographically, there were some areas in which the whole population had been Reformed. These included villages in and around the Massif Central, as well as the area around Dordogne, which used to be almost entirely Reformed too. John Calvin was a Frenchman and himself largely responsible for the introduction and spread of the Reformed tradition in France. He wrote in French, but unlike the Protestant development in Germany, where Lutheran writings were widely distributed and could be read by the common man, it was not the case in France, where only nobles adopted the new faith and the folk remained Catholic. This is true for many areas in the west and south controlled by the Huguenot nobility. Although relatively large portions of the peasant population became Reformed there, the people, altogether, still remained majority Catholic.

Overall, Huguenot presence was heavily concentrated in the western and southern portions of the French kingdom, as nobles there secured the practice of the new faith. These included Languedoc-Roussillon, Gascony and even a strip of land that stretched into the Dauphiné. Huguenots lived on the Atlantic coast in La Rochelle, and also spread across provinces of Normandy and Poitou. In the south, towns like Castres, Montauban, Montpellier and Nîmes were Huguenot strongholds. In addition, a dense network of Protestant villages permeated the rural mountainous region of the Cevennes. Inhabited by Camisards, it continues to be the backbone of French Protestantism. Historians estimate that roughly 80% of all Huguenots lived in the western and southern areas of France.

Today, there are some Reformed communities around the world that still retain their Huguenot identity. In France, Calvinists in the United Protestant Church of France and also some in the Protestant Reformed Church of Alsace and Lorraine consider themselves Huguenots. A rural Huguenot community in the Cevennes that rebelled in 1702 is still called Camisards, especially in historical contexts. Huguenot exiles in the United Kingdom, the United States, South Africa, Australia, and a number of other countries still retain their identity.

== Emigration and diaspora ==
As a final destination, most of the Huguenot émigrés moved to Protestant states such as the Dutch Republic, England and Wales (prominently in Kent and London), Protestant-controlled Ireland, the Channel Islands, Scotland, Denmark, Sweden, Switzerland, the electorates of Brandenburg and the Palatinate in the Holy Roman Empire, and the Duchy of Prussia. Some fled as refugees to the Dutch Cape Colony, the Dutch East Indies, various Caribbean colonies, and several of the Dutch and English colonies in North America. A few families went to Orthodox Russia and Catholic Quebec.

Today most Huguenots have assimilated into the various societies and cultures where they have settled. Remnant communities of Camisards in the Cévennes, most Reformed members of the United Protestant Church of France, French members of the largely German Protestant Reformed Church of Alsace and Lorraine, and the Huguenot diaspora in England and Australia, all still retain their beliefs and Huguenot designation.

Year	Number of Reformed members in France
1519	None
1560	1,800,000
1572	2,000,000
1600	1,200,000
1685	900,000
1700	100,000 or less
2013	300,000

== History ==
=== Origins ===
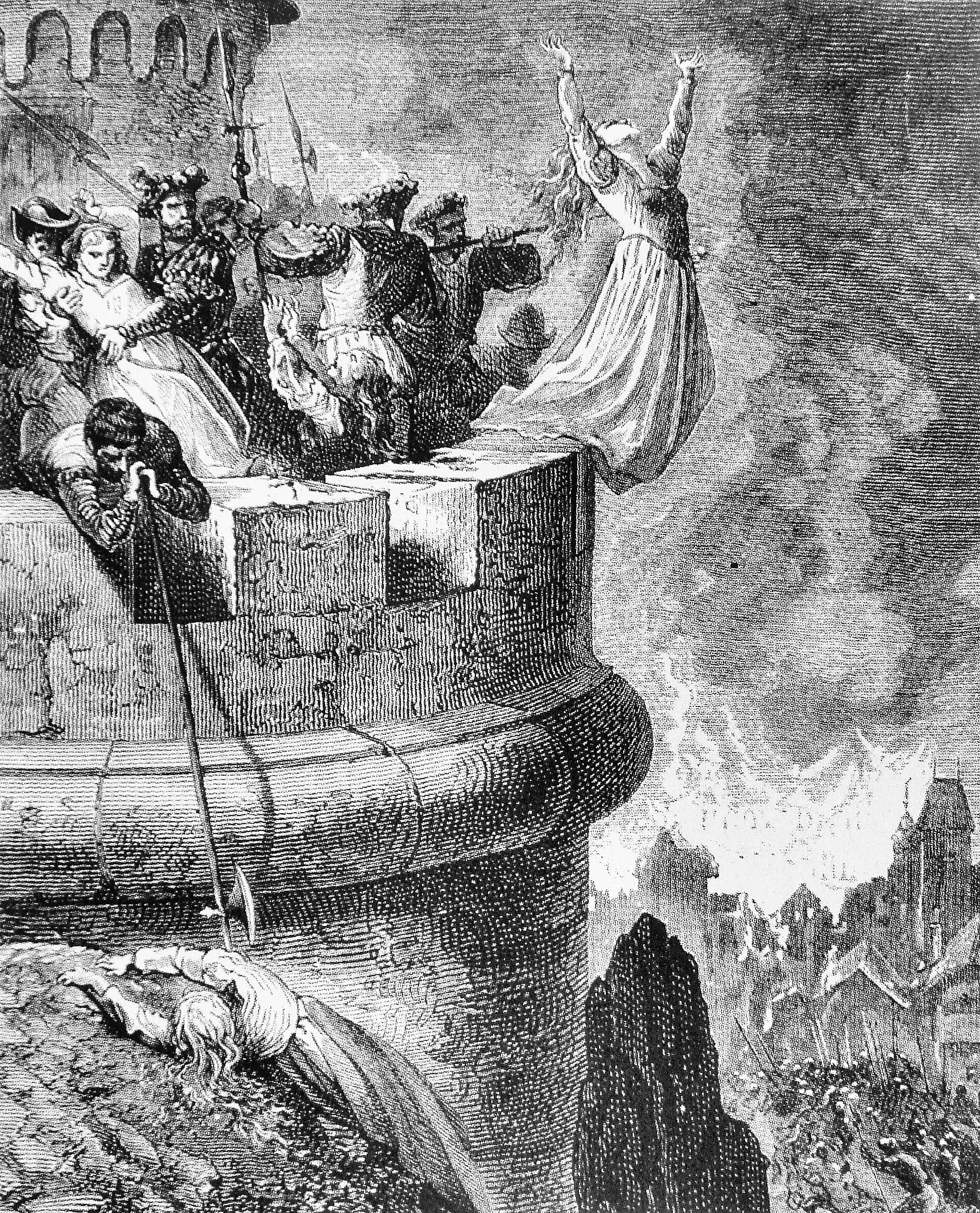
Persecution of the Waldensians in the massacre of Mérindol in 1545

The availability of the Bible in vernacular languages was important to the spread of the Protestant movement and development of the Reformed Church in France. The country had a long history of struggles with the papacy (see the Avignon Papacy, for example) by the time the Protestant Reformation finally arrived. Around 1294, a French version of the scriptures was prepared by the Roman Catholic priest, Guyard des Moulins. A two-volume illustrated folio paraphrase version based on his manuscript, by Jean de Rély, was printed in Paris in 1487.

The first known translation of the Bible into one of France's regional languages, Arpitan or Franco-Provençal, had been prepared by the pre-Protestant reformer Peter Waldo (c. 1140 – c. 1205). The Waldensians created fortified areas, as in Cabrières, perhaps attacking an abbey. They were suppressed by Francis I in 1545 in the Massacre of Mérindol.

Other predecessors of the Reformed church included the pro-reform and Gallican Roman Catholics, such as Jacques Lefevre (c. 1455–1536). The Gallicans briefly achieved independence for the French church, on the principle that the religion of France could not be controlled by the Bishop of Rome, a foreign power. During the Protestant Reformation, Lefevre, a professor at the University of Paris, published his French translation of the New Testament in 1523, followed by the whole Bible in the French language in 1530. William Farel was a student of Lefevre who went on to become a leader of the Swiss Reformation, establishing a Protestant republican government in Geneva. Jean Cauvin (John Calvin), another student at the University of Paris, also converted to Protestantism. Long after the sect was suppressed by Francis I, the remaining French Waldensians, then mostly in the Luberon region, sought to join Farel, Calvin and the Reformation, and Olivétan published a French Bible for them. The French Confession of 1559 shows a decidedly Calvinistic influence.

Although usually Huguenots are lumped into one group, there were actually two types of Huguenots that emerged. Since the Huguenots had political and religious goals, it was commonplace to refer to the Calvinists as "Huguenots of religion" and those who opposed the monarchy as "Huguenots of the state", who were mostly nobles.

- The Huguenots of religion were influenced by John Calvin's works and established Calvinist synods. They were determined to end religious oppression.
- The Huguenots of the state opposed the monopoly of power the Guise family had and wanted to attack the authority of the crown.

This group of Huguenots from southern France had frequent issues with the strict Calvinist tenets that are outlined in many of John Calvin's letters to the synods of the Languedoc.

=== Reformation and growth ===
Early in his reign, Francis I (r. 1515–1547) persecuted the old, pre-Protestant movement of Waldensians in southeastern France. Francis initially protected the Huguenot dissidents from Parlementary measures seeking to exterminate them. After the 1534 Affair of the Placards, however, he distanced himself from Huguenots and their protection.

Huguenot numbers grew rapidly between 1555 and 1561, chiefly amongst nobles and city dwellers. During this time, their opponents first dubbed the Protestants Huguenots; but they called themselves reformés, or "Reformed". They organised their first national synod in 1558 in Paris.

By 1562, the estimated number of Huguenots peaked at approximately two million, concentrated mainly in the western, southern, and some central parts of France, compared to approximately sixteen million Catholics during the same period. Persecution diminished the number of Huguenots who remained in France.

=== Wars of religion ===
As the Huguenots gained influence and displayed their faith more openly, Roman Catholic hostility towards them grew, even though the French crown offered increasingly liberal political concessions and edicts of toleration.

Following the accidental death of Henry II in 1559, his son succeeded as King Francis II along with his wife, the Queen Consort, also known as Mary, Queen of Scots. During the eighteen months of the reign of Francis II, Mary encouraged a policy of rounding up French Huguenots on charges of heresy and putting them in front of Catholic judges, and employing torture and burning as punishments for dissenters. Mary returned to Scotland a widow in the summer of 1561.

In 1561, the Edict of Orléans declared an end to the persecution, and the Edict of Saint-Germain of January 1562 formally recognised the Huguenots for the first time. However, these measures disguised the growing tensions between Protestants and Catholics.

=== Civil wars ===
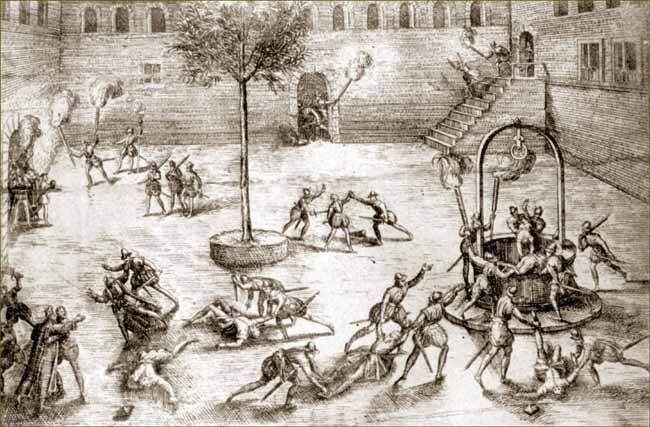
Huguenots massacring Catholics in the Michelade in Nîmes

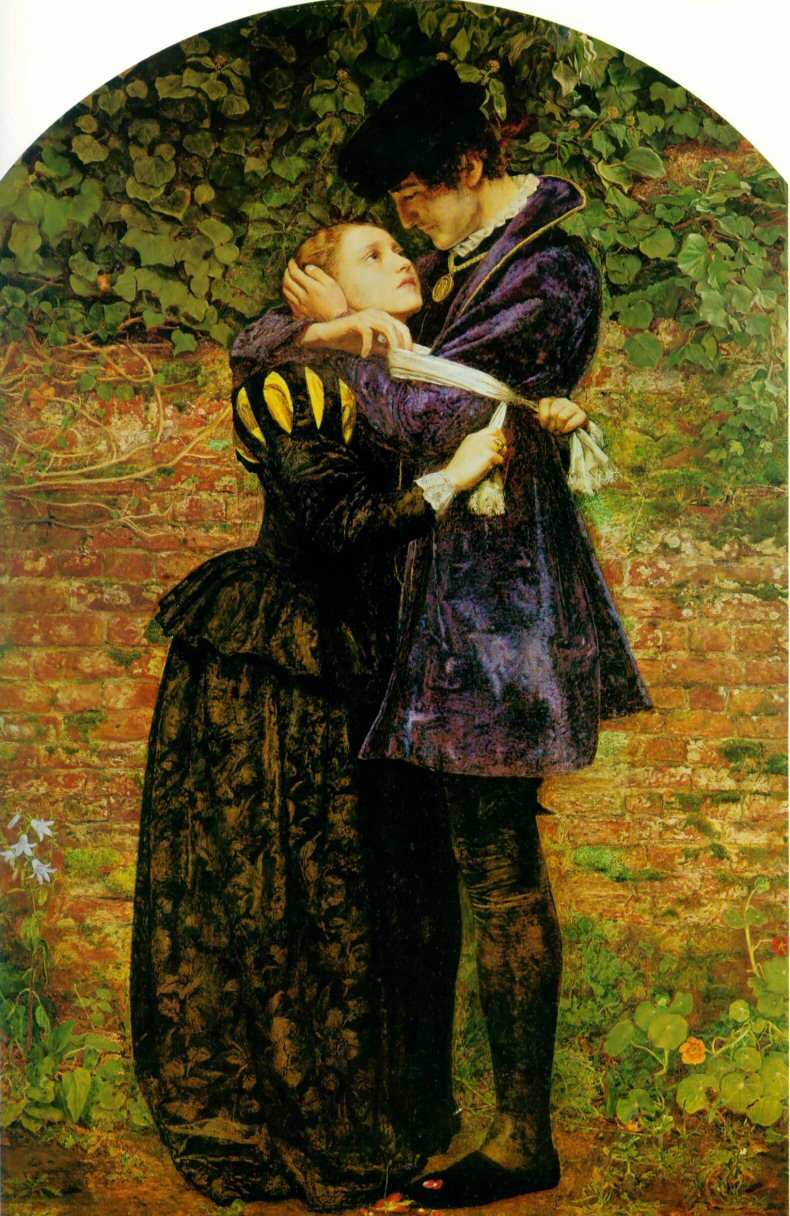
John Everett Millais' painting, A Huguenot, on St. Bartholomew's Day

These tensions spurred eight civil wars, interrupted by periods of relative calm, between 1562 and 1598. With each break in peace, the Huguenots' trust in the Catholic throne diminished, and the violence became more severe, and Protestant demands became grander, until a lasting cessation of open hostility finally occurred in 1598. The wars gradually took on a dynastic character, developing into an extended feud between the Houses of Bourbon and Guise, both of which — in addition to holding rival religious views — staked a claim to the French throne. The crown, occupied by the House of Valois, generally supported the Catholic side, but on occasion switched over to the Protestant cause when politically expedient.

The French Wars of Religion began with the Massacre of Vassy on 1 March 1562, when dozens (some sources say hundreds) of Huguenots were killed, and about 200 were wounded. It was in this year that some Huguenots destroyed the tomb and remains of Saint Irenaeus (d. 202), an early Church father and bishop who was a disciple of Polycarp. The Michelade by Huguenots against Catholics was later on 29 September 1567.

=== St. Bartholomew's Day massacre ===
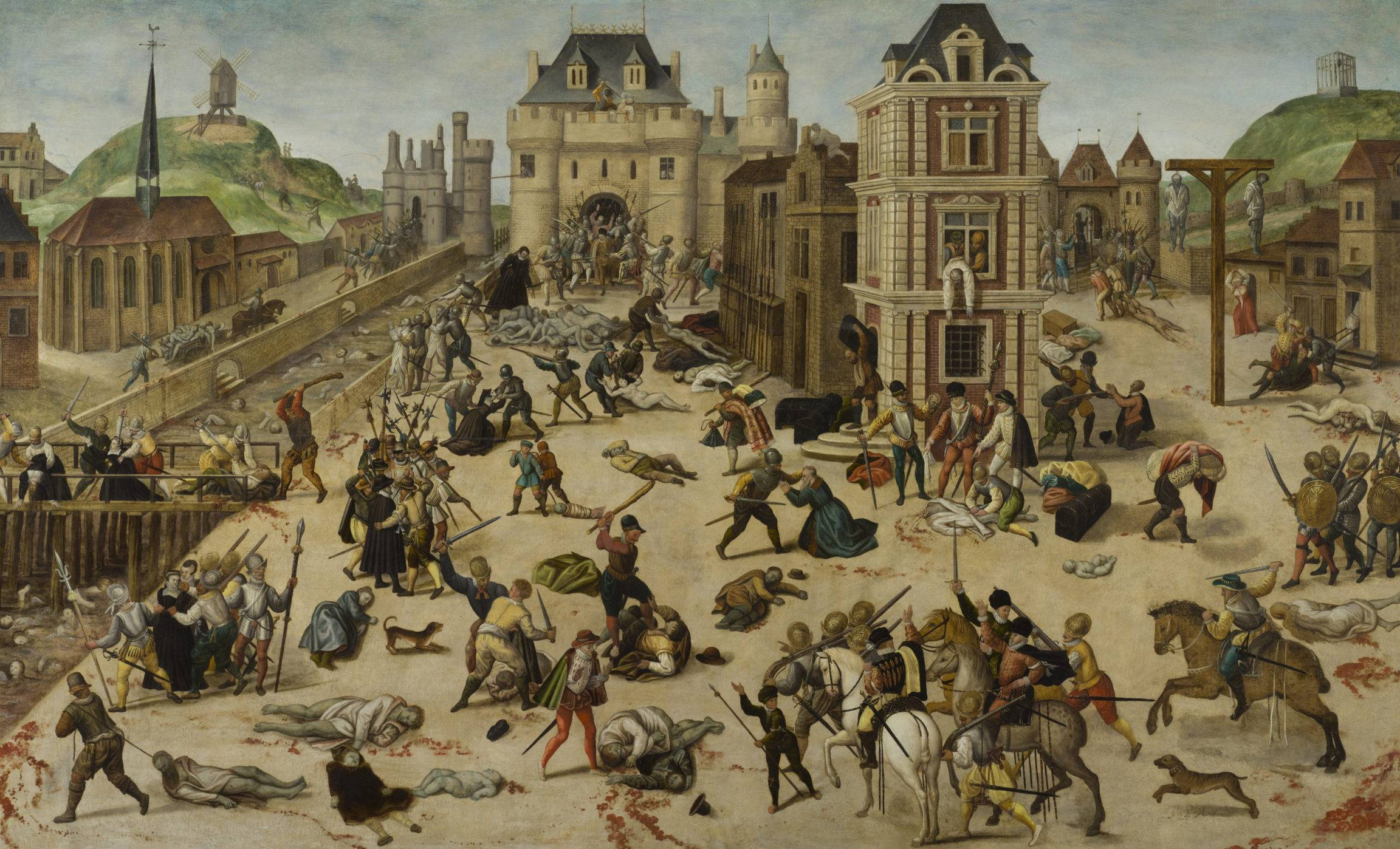
The St. Bartholomew's Day massacre of French Protestants (1572). It was the climax of the French Wars of Religion, which were brought to an end by the Edict of Nantes (1598). In 1620, persecution was renewed and continued until the French Revolution in 1789.

In what became known as the St. Bartholomew's Day massacre of 24 August to 3 October 1572, Catholics killed thousands of Huguenots in Paris and similar massacres took place in other towns in the following weeks. The main provincial towns and cities experiencing massacres were Aix, Bordeaux, Bourges, Lyon, Meaux, Orléans, Rouen, Toulouse, and Troyes.

Although the exact number of fatalities throughout the country is not known, on 23 or 24 August, between 2,000 and 3,000 Protestants were killed in Paris and a further 3,000 to 7,000 more in the French provinces. By 17 September, almost 25,000 Protestants had been massacred in Paris alone. Beyond Paris, the killings continued until 3 October. An amnesty granted in 1573 pardoned the perpetrators. Following the killings many Protestants fled to the Kentish coast among other places.

=== Edict of Nantes ===
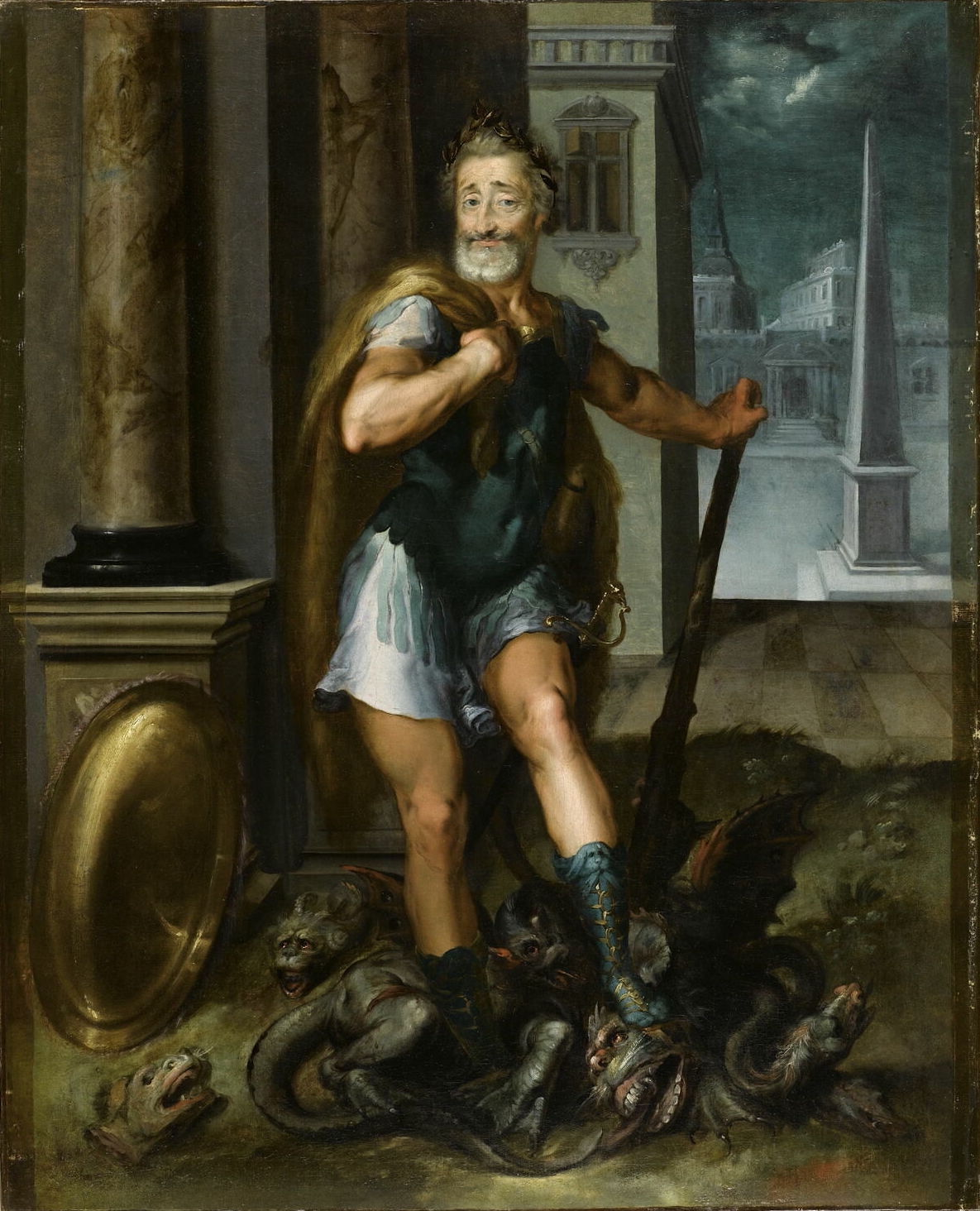
Henry IV, as Hercules vanquishing the Lernaean Hydra (i.e., the Catholic League), by Toussaint Dubreuil, circa 1600

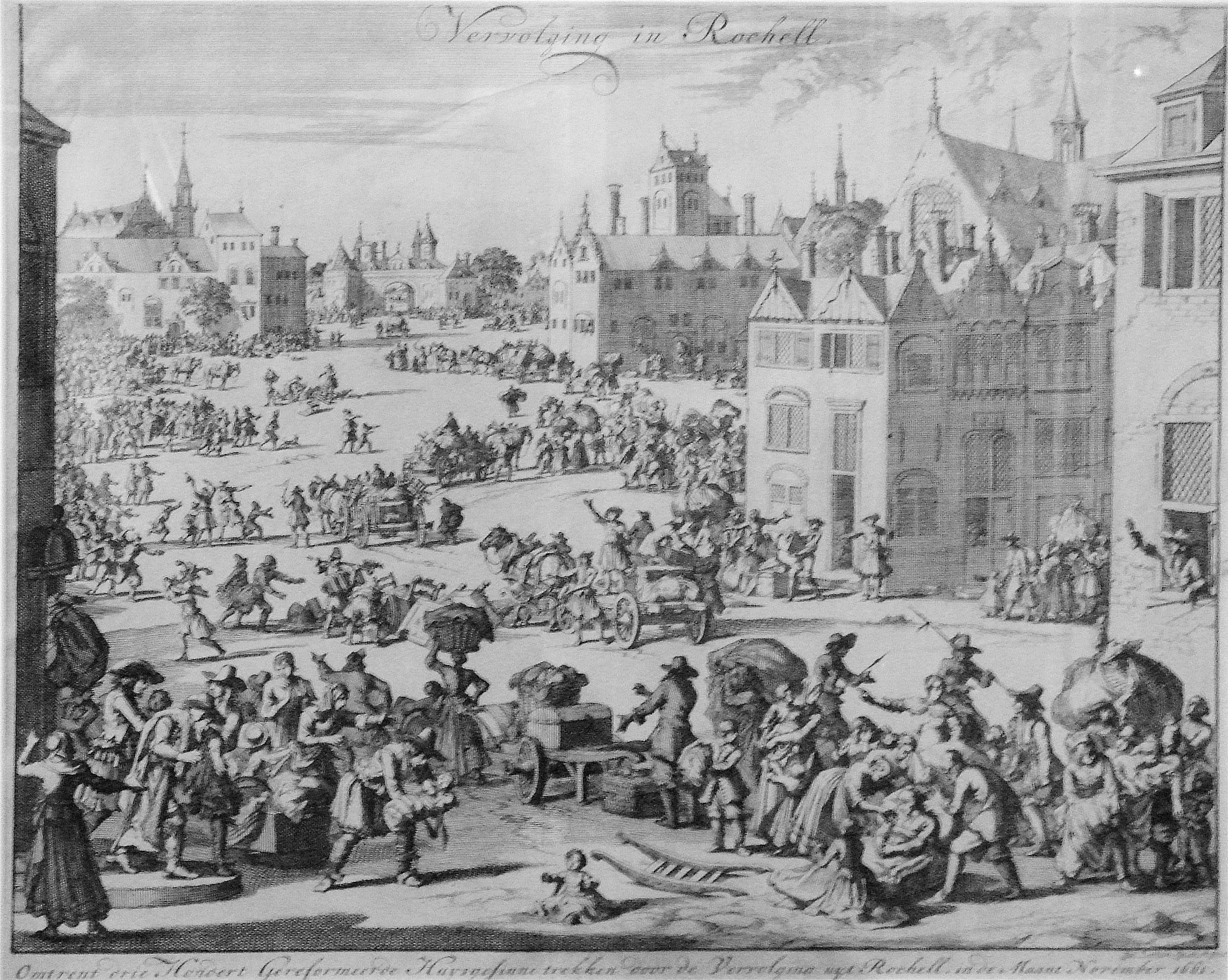
Expulsion from La Rochelle of 300 Protestant families in November 1661

The pattern of warfare, followed by brief periods of peace, continued for 25 years. The warfare was definitively quelled in 1598, when Henry of Navarre, having succeeded to the French throne as Henry IV, and having recanted Protestantism in favour of Roman Catholicism in order to obtain the French crown, issued the Edict of Nantes. The Edict reaffirmed Roman Catholicism as the state religion of France, but granted the Protestants equality with Catholics under the throne and a degree of religious and political freedom within their domains. The Edict simultaneously protected Catholic interests by discouraging the founding of new Protestant churches in Catholic-controlled regions.

With the proclamation of the Edict of Nantes, and the subsequent protection of Huguenot rights, pressures to leave France abated. However, enforcement of the Edict grew increasingly irregular over time, making life so intolerable that many fled the country. The Huguenot population of France dropped to 856,000 by the mid-1660s, of which a plurality lived in rural areas. The greatest concentrations of Huguenots at this time resided in the regions of Guienne, Saintonge-Aunis-Angoumois and Poitou.

Montpellier was among the most important of the 66 villes de sûreté ("cities of protection" or "protected cities") that the Edict of 1598 granted to the Huguenots. The city's political institutions and the university were all handed over to the Huguenots. Tension with Paris led to a siege by the royal army in 1622. Peace terms called for the dismantling of the city's fortifications. A royal citadel was built and the university and consulate were taken over by the Catholic party. Even before the Edict of Alès (1629), Protestant rule was dead and the ville de sûreté was no more.

By 1620, the Huguenots were on the defensive, and the government increasingly applied pressure. A series of three small civil wars known as the Huguenot rebellions broke out, mainly in southwestern France, between 1621 and 1629, in which the Reformed areas revolted against royal authority. The uprising occurred a decade following the death of Henry IV, who was assassinated by a Catholic fanatic in 1610. His successor Louis XIII, under the regency of his Italian Catholic mother Marie de' Medici, was more intolerant of Protestantism. The Huguenots responded by establishing independent political and military structures, establishing diplomatic contacts with foreign powers, and openly revolting against central power. The rebellions were implacably suppressed by the French crown.

=== Edict of Fontainebleau ===
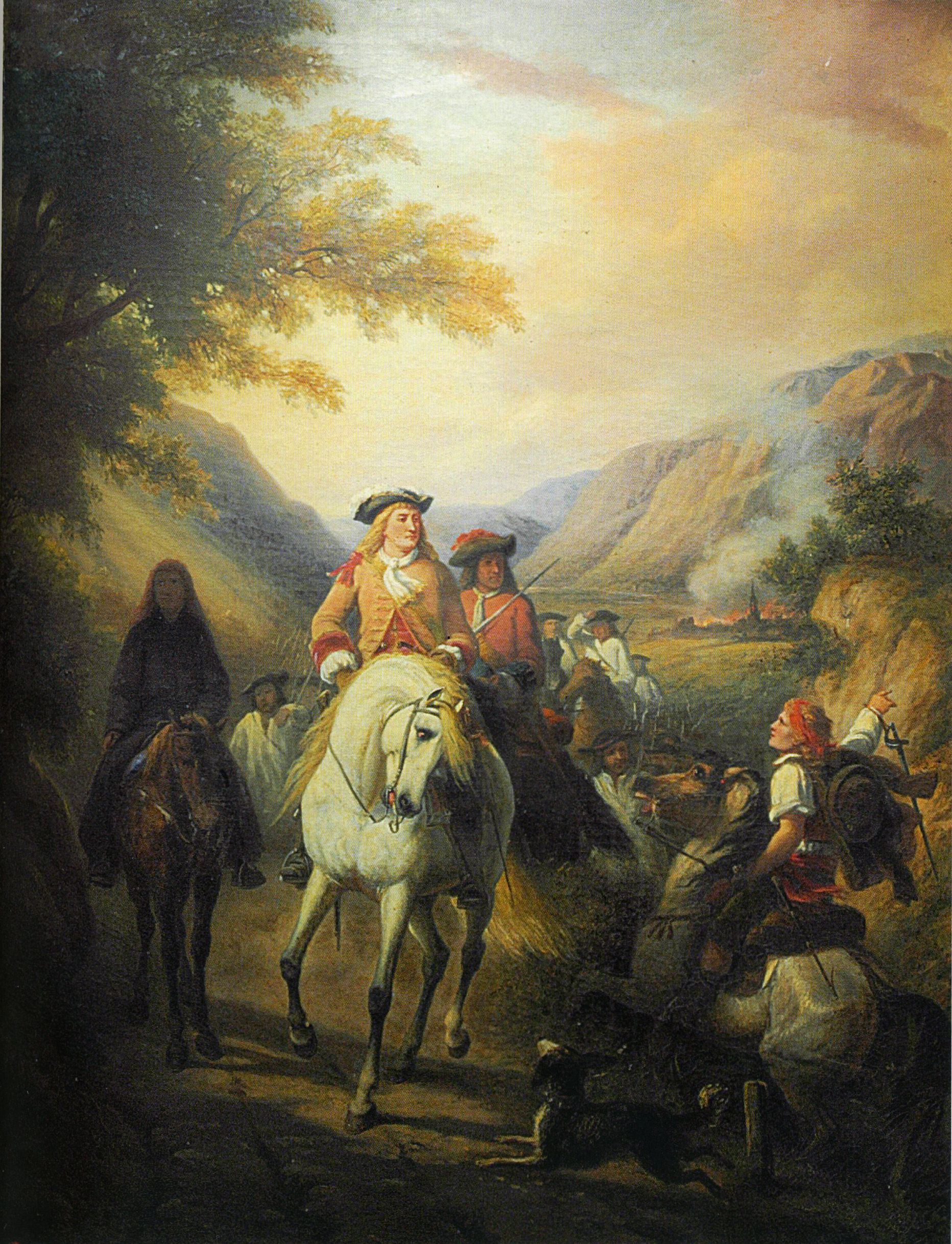
Huguenot rebel leader Jean Cavalier during the War of the Camisards in the Cévennes and Languedoc

Louis XIV inherited the throne in 1643 and acted increasingly aggressively to force the Huguenots to convert. At first he sent missionaries, backed by a fund to financially reward converts to Roman Catholicism. Then he imposed penalties, closed Huguenot schools and excluded them from favoured professions. Escalating, he instituted dragonnades, which included the occupation and looting of Huguenot homes by military troops, in an effort to forcibly convert them. In 1685, he issued the Edict of Fontainebleau, revoking the Edict of Nantes and declaring Protestantism illegal.

The revocation forbade Protestant services, required the education of children as Catholics, and prohibited emigration. It proved disastrous to the Huguenots and costly for France. It precipitated civil bloodshed, ruined commerce, and resulted in the illegal flight from the country of hundreds of thousands of Protestants, many of whom were intellectuals, doctors and business leaders whose skills were transferred to Britain as well as Holland, Switzerland, Prussia, South Africa and other places they fled to. 4,000 emigrated to the Thirteen Colonies, where they settled, especially in New York, the Delaware River Valley in Eastern Pennsylvania, New Jersey, and Virginia. The English authorities welcomed the French refugees, providing money from both government and private agencies to aid their relocation. Those Huguenots who stayed in France were subsequently forcibly converted to Roman Catholicism and were called "new converts".

After this, the Huguenots (with estimates ranging from 200,000 to 1,000,000) fled to Protestant countries: England, the Netherlands, Switzerland, Norway, Denmark, and Prussia—whose Calvinist Great Elector Frederick William welcomed them to help rebuild his war-ravaged and underpopulated country. Following this exodus, Huguenots remained in large numbers in only one region of France: the rugged Cévennes region in the south. There were also some Calvinists in the Alsace region, which then belonged to the Holy Roman Empire. In 1702, a regional group known as the Camisards (who were Huguenots of the mountainous Massif Central region) rioted against the Catholic Church, burning churches and killing the clergy. It took French troops years to hunt down and destroy all the bands of Camisards, between 1702 and 1709.

=== End of persecution ===
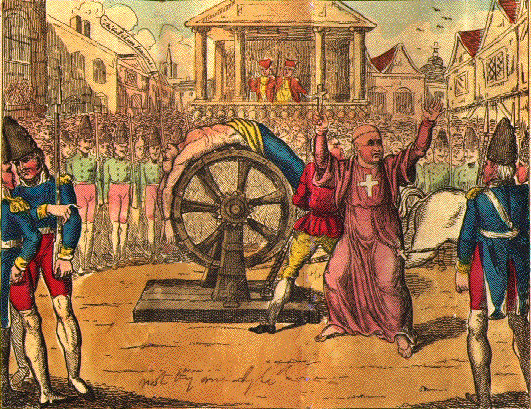
The death of Jean Calas, who was broken on the wheel at Toulouse, 9 March 1762

By the 1760s Protestantism was no longer a favourite religion of the elite. By then, most Protestants were Cévennes peasants. It was still illegal, and, although the law was seldom enforced, it could be a threat or a nuisance to Protestants. Calvinists lived primarily in the Midi; about 200,000 Lutherans accompanied by some Calvinists lived in the newly acquired Alsace, where the 1648 Treaty of Westphalia effectively protected them.

Persecution of Protestants diminished in France after 1724, finally ending with the Edict of Versailles, commonly called the Edict of Tolerance, signed by Louis XVI in 1787. Two years later, with the Declaration of the Rights of Man and Citizen of 1789, Protestants gained equal rights as citizens.

=== Right of return to France between 1790 and 1945 ===
The government encouraged descendants of exiles to return, offering them French citizenship in a 15 December 1790 law:

All persons born in a foreign country and descending in any degree from a French man or woman expatriated for religious reason are declared French nationals (naturels français) and will benefit from rights attached to that quality if they come back to France, establish their domicile there and take the civic oath.

Article 4 of 26 June 1889 Nationality Law stated: "Descendants of families proscribed by the revocation of the Edict of Nantes will continue to benefit from the 15 December 1790 Law, but on the condition that a nominal decree should be issued for every petitioner. That decree will only produce its effects for the future."

Foreign descendants of Huguenots lost the automatic right to French citizenship in 1945 (by force of the Ordonnance n° 45-2441 du 19 octobre 1945, which revoked the 1889 Nationality Law). It states in article 3: "This application does not, however, affect the validity of past acts by the person or rights acquired by third parties on the basis of previous laws."

=== Modern times ===
In the 1920s and 1930s, members of the extreme-right Action Française movement expressed strong animus against Huguenots and other Protestants in general, as well as against Jews and Freemasons. They were regarded as groups supporting the French Republic, which Action Française sought to overthrow.

In World War II, Huguenots led by André Trocmé in the village of Le Chambon-sur-Lignon in Cévennes helped save many Jews. They hid them in secret places or helped them get out of Vichy France. André Trocmé preached against discrimination as the Nazis were gaining power in neighbouring Germany and urged his Protestant Huguenot congregation to hide Jewish refugees from the Holocaust.

In 2003, there were approximately one million Protestants in France, representing some 2% of its population. Most are concentrated in Alsace in northeast France and the Cévennes mountain region in the south, who still regard themselves as Huguenots to this day. Surveys suggest that Protestantism has grown in recent years, though this is due primarily to the expansion of evangelical Protestant churches, which particularly have adherents among immigrant groups that are generally considered distinct from the French Huguenot population.

A diaspora of French Australians still considers itself Huguenot, even after centuries of exile. Long integrated into Australian society, it is encouraged by the Huguenot Society of Australia to embrace and conserve its cultural heritage, aided by the Society's genealogical research services.

In the United States, there are several Huguenot worship groups and societies. The Huguenot Society of America has headquarters in New York City and has a broad national membership. One of the most active Huguenot groups is in Charleston, South Carolina. While many American Huguenot groups worship in borrowed churches, the congregation in Charleston has its own church. Although services are conducted largely in English, every year the church holds an Annual French Service, which is conducted entirely in French using an adaptation of the Liturgies of Neuchâtel (1737) and Vallangin (1772). Typically, the Annual French Service takes place on the first or second Sunday after Easter in commemoration of the signing of the Edict of Nantes.

== Exodus ==
=== The trip ===
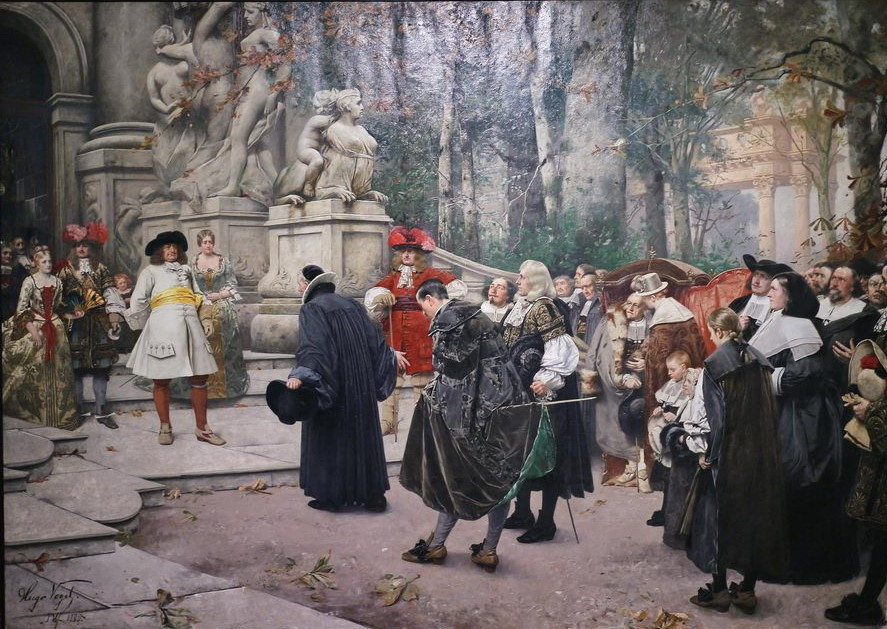
Reception of Huguenot refugees by the Great Elector at Potsdam Palace, 1685

French Protestants reacted differently to persecution and the ban of Protestantism. Some converted to the Catholic faith, while others decided to leave. Some left their elderly parents, or children who were too young to travel. Those who left were from every social class and every profession, including lawyers, merchants and officers. They came from all over France. The only common denominator was that they were Protestants, would not convert to Catholicism and were willing to risk it all to practice their religion freely. Those who left everything, including land to be confiscated unless a family that converted to Catholicism inherited it and paid the refugees. This last scenario happened very rarely.

40% of the Protestants from the Northern part of France left, while 25% of the south did the same. Those closer to the border (both land and sea) as well as where they were a minority in the population of the area left more: it was the case in the Paris area, Normandy and the Atlantic coast. Farmers often stayed attached to the land while craftsmen and merchants represented a large group of those who left. Some temporarily converted to Catholicism to sell their property before leaving. Others left overnight.

Those who left must rely on guides who knew the routes out of France. Most were honest but some sold out their customers to the authorities. Paying for those guides was expensive as they risked being sent to the galley until 1687, and later hanging. They traveled by night and were often disguised. Often, the Huguenots purchased paper guides at a very high price. These guides told the reader which cities to go to, where to avoid, who to contact, etc.

Many left the country by sea, leaving from Bordeaux, La Rochelle, the Île de Ré, Nantes, and other ports along the coast aboard English and Dutch ships after they had made their way to the coast using what was available and what could be afforded. Others went by land to the Dutch Republic or Switzerland. Many walked hundreds of miles. The borders with other countries were well guarded, as well as the border between provinces within France and the risk of arrest was a constant fear until they arrived safely. On the way, they encountered honest people who helped them as well as some who sold them out or stole their money. Help came from Protestants and Catholics. The fugitives sometimes had to lie about their identity. Entire networks existed to escort them across France to a safe country. Some fugitives were arrested on the way. For those who made it, they often arrived tired, starving, with nothing to wear, and no money to their name.

The details of these trips have been recently discovered through the memoirs written by Huguenots for their families. These were often written years later, once safely outside of France and published only recently. These include:

- Mémoires d'une famille huguenote victime de la révocation de l'édit de Nantes by Jacques Fontaine
- Mémoires by Isaac Dumont de Bostaquet
- Mémoires d'un Protestant du Vigan des dragonnades au Refuge (1683–1686) by Jean Valat
- Journal de Jean Migault ou malheurs d'une famille protestante du Poitou victime de la révocation de l'édit de Nantes (1682–1689) by Jean Migault

=== Early emigration to colonies ===
The first Huguenots to leave France sought freedom from persecution in Switzerland and the Netherlands. A group of Huguenots were part of the French colonisers who arrived in Brazil in 1555 to found France Antarctique. Ships with around 500 people arrived at the Guanabara Bay, present-day Rio de Janeiro, and settled on a small island. A fort, named Fort Coligny, was built to protect them from attack from the Portuguese troops and Brazilian natives. It was an attempt to establish a French colony in South America. The fort was destroyed in 1560 by the Portuguese, who captured some of the Huguenots. The Portuguese threatened their Protestant prisoners with death if they did not convert to Roman Catholicism. The Huguenots of Guanabara, as they are now known, produced what is known as the Guanabara Confession of Faith to explain their beliefs. The Portuguese executed them.

=== South Africa ===
Huguenots first settled at the Cape of Good Hope in 1671; the first documented was the wagonmaker François Vilion (Viljoen). The first Huguenot to arrive at the Cape of Good Hope was Maria de la Quellerie, wife of commander Jan van Riebeeck (and daughter of a Walloon church minister), who arrived on 6 April 1652 to establish a settlement at what is today Cape Town. The couple left for Batavia ten years later.

But it was not until 31 December 1687 that the first organised group of Huguenots set sail from the Netherlands to the Dutch East India Company post at the Cape of Good Hope. The largest portion of the Huguenots to settle in the Cape arrived between 1688 and 1689 in seven ships as part of the organised migration, but quite a few arrived as late as 1700; thereafter, the numbers declined and only small groups arrived at a time. Many of these settlers were given land in an area that was later called Franschhoek (Dutch for "French Corner"), in the present-day Western Cape province of South Africa. A large monument to commemorate the arrival of the Huguenots in South Africa was inaugurated on 7 April 1948 at Franschhoek. The Huguenot Memorial Museum was also erected there and opened in 1957.

The official policy of the Dutch East India governors was to integrate the Huguenots and the Dutch communities. When Paul Roux, a pastor who arrived with the main group of Huguenots, died in 1724, the Dutch administration, as a special concession, permitted another French cleric to take his place "for the benefit of the elderly who spoke only French". But with assimilation, within three generations the Huguenots had generally adopted Dutch as their first and home language.

Many of the farms in the Western Cape province in South Africa still bear French names. Many families, today, mostly Afrikaans-speaking, have surnames indicating their French Huguenot ancestry. Examples include: Blignaut, Cilliers, Cronje (Cronier), de Klerk (Le Clercq), de Villiers, du Plessis, Du Preez (Des Pres), du Randt (Durand), du Toit, Duvenhage (Du Vinage), Franck, Fouché, Fourie (Fleurit), Gervais, Giliomee (Guilliaume), Gous/Gouws (Gauch), Hugo, Jordaan (Jourdan), Joubert, Kriek, Labuschagne (la Buscagne), le Roux, Lombard, Malan, Malherbe, Marais, Maree, Minnaar (Mesnard), Nel (Nell), Naudé, Nortjé (Nortier), Pienaar (Pinard), Retief (Retif), Roux, Rossouw (Rousseau), Taljaard (Taillard), TerBlanche, Theron, Viljoen (Vilion) and Visagie (Visage). The wine industry in South Africa owes a significant debt to the Huguenots, some of whom had vineyards in France, or were brandy distillers, and used their skills in their new home.

=== North America ===
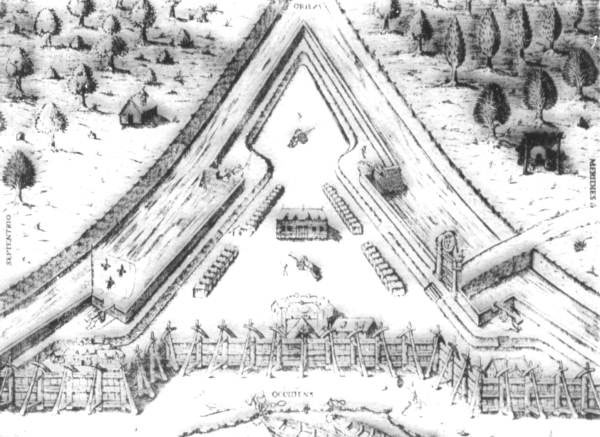
Etching of Fort Caroline

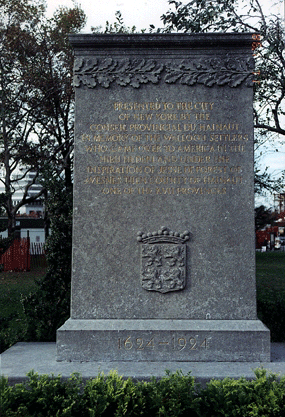
Walloon Monument in Battery Park, Manhattan, New York City

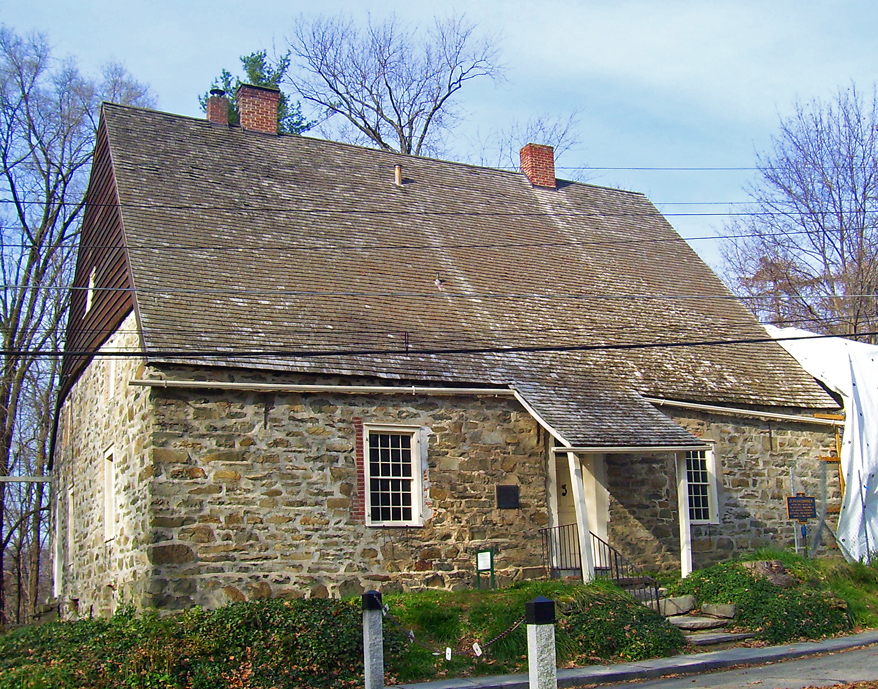
Jean Hasbrouck House (1721) on Huguenot Street in New Paltz, New York

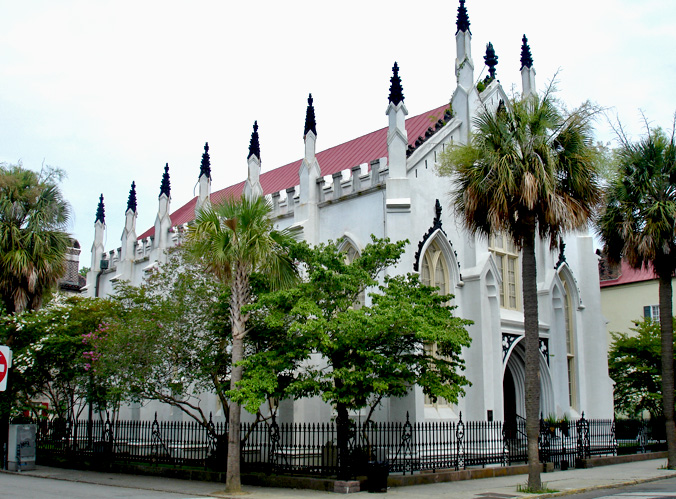
French Huguenot Church in Charleston, South Carolina

French Huguenots made two attempts to establish a haven in North America. In 1562, naval officer Jean Ribault led an expedition that explored Florida and the present-day Southeastern United States, and founded the outpost of Charlesfort on Parris Island, South Carolina. The French Wars of Religion precluded a return voyage, and the outpost was abandoned. In 1564, Ribault's former lieutenant René Goulaine de Laudonnière launched a second voyage to build a colony; he established Fort Caroline in what is now Jacksonville, Florida. War at home again precluded a resupply mission, and the colony struggled. In 1565 the Spanish decided to enforce their claim to La Florida, and sent Pedro Menéndez de Avilés, who established the settlement of St. Augustine near Fort Caroline. Menéndez's forces routed the French and executed most of the Protestant captives.

Barred by the government from settling in New France, Huguenots led by Jessé de Forest sailed to North America in 1624 and settled instead in the Dutch colony of New Netherland (later incorporated into New York and New Jersey), as well as Great Britain's colonies, including Nova Scotia. A number of New Amsterdam's families were of Huguenot origin, often having emigrated to the Netherlands from France as refugees previously. In 1628 the Huguenots established a congregation as L'Église française à la Nouvelle-Amsterdam (the French church in New Amsterdam). This parish continues today as the French Church du Saint-Esprit, now a part of the Episcopal Church (Anglican) communion, and welcomes Francophone New Yorkers from all over the world. Upon their arrival in New Amsterdam, Huguenots were offered land directly across from Manhattan on Long Island for a permanent settlement and chose the harbour at the end of Newtown Creek, becoming the first Europeans to live in Brooklyn, then known as Boschwick, in the neighbourhood now known as Bushwick.

Huguenot immigrants settled throughout pre-colonial America, including in New Amsterdam (New York City), some 21 miles north of New York in a town they named New Rochelle, and some further upstate in New Paltz. The "Huguenot Street Historic District" in New Paltz has been designated a National Historic Landmark site and contains one of the oldest streets in the United States of America. A small group of Huguenots also settled on the south shore of Staten Island along the New York Harbor, for which the current neighbourhood of Huguenot was named. Huguenot refugees also settled in the Delaware River Valley of Eastern Pennsylvania and Hunterdon County, New Jersey in 1725. Frenchtown in New Jersey bears the mark of early settlers.

New Rochelle, located in the county of Westchester on the north shore of Long Island Sound, seemed to be the great location of the Huguenots in New York. It is said that they landed on the coastline peninsula of Davenport's Neck called "Bauffet's Point" after travelling from England, where they had previously taken refuge on account of religious persecution, four years before the revocation of the Edict of Nantes. They purchased from John Pell, Lord of Pelham Manor, a tract of land consisting of six thousand one hundred acres with the help of Jacob Leisler. It was named New Rochelle after La Rochelle, their former strong-hold in France. A small wooden church was first erected in the community, followed by a second church that was built of stone. Previous to its erection, the strong men would often walk twenty-three miles on Saturday evening, the distance by the road from New Rochelle to New York, to attend the Sunday service. The church was eventually replaced by a third, Trinity-St. Paul's Episcopal Church, which contains heirlooms including the original bell from the French Huguenot Church Eglise du St. Esperit on Pine Street in New York City, which is preserved as a relic in the tower room. The Huguenot cemetery, or the "Huguenot Burial Ground", has since been recognised as a historic cemetery that is the final resting place for a wide range of the Huguenot founders, early settlers and prominent citizens dating back more than three centuries.

Some Huguenot immigrants settled in central and eastern Pennsylvania. They assimilated with the predominantly Pennsylvania German settlers of the area.

In 1700 several hundred French Huguenots migrated from England to the colony of Virginia, where the King William III of England had promised them land grants in Lower Norfolk County. When they arrived, colonial authorities offered them instead land 20 miles above the falls of the James River, at the abandoned Monacan village known as Manakin Town, now in Goochland County. Some settlers landed in present-day Chesterfield County. On 12 May 1705, the Virginia General Assembly passed an act to naturalise the 148 Huguenots still resident at Manakintown. Of the original 390 settlers in the isolated settlement, many had died; others lived outside town on farms in the English style; and others moved to different areas. Gradually they intermarried with their English neighbours. Through the 18th and 19th centuries, descendants of the French migrated west into the Piedmont, and across the Appalachian Mountains into the West of what became Kentucky, Tennessee, Missouri, and other states. In the Manakintown area, the Huguenot Memorial Bridge across the James River and Huguenot Road were named in their honour, as were many local features, including several schools, including Huguenot High School.

In the early years, many Huguenots also settled in the area of present-day Charleston, South Carolina. In 1685, Rev. Elie Prioleau from the town of Pons in France was among the first to settle there. He became pastor of the first Huguenot church in North America in that city. After the Revocation of the Edict of Nantes in 1685, several Huguenots including Edmund Bohun of Suffolk, England, Pierre Bacot of Touraine France, Jean Postell of Dieppe France, Alexander Pepin, Antoine Poitevin of Orsement France, and Jacques de Bordeaux of Grenoble, immigrated to the Charleston Orange district. They were very successful at marriage and property speculation. After petitioning the British Crown in 1697 for the right to own land in the Baronies, they prospered as slave owners on the Cooper, Ashepoo, Ashley and Santee River plantations they purchased from the British Landgrave Edmund Bellinger. Some of their descendants moved into the Deep South and Texas, where they developed new plantations.

The French Huguenot Church of Charleston, which remains independent, is the oldest continuously active Huguenot congregation in the United States. L'Église du Saint-Esprit in New York, founded in 1628, is older, but it left the French Reformed movement in 1804 to become part of the Episcopal Church.

Most of the Huguenot congregations (or individuals) in North America eventually affiliated with other Protestant denominations with more numerous members. The Huguenots adapted quickly and often married outside their immediate French communities. Their descendants in many families continue to use French first names and surnames for their children. Assimilated, the French made numerous contributions to United States economic life, especially as merchants and artisans in the late Colonial and early Federal periods. For example, Eleuthère Irénée du Pont, a former student of Lavoisier, established the Eleutherian gunpowder mills. Howard Hughes, famed investor, pilot, film director, and philanthropist, was also of Huguenot descent and descendant from Rev. John Gano.

Paul Revere was descended from Huguenot refugees, as was Henry Laurens, who signed the Articles of Confederation for South Carolina. Other descendants of Huguenots included Jack Jouett, who made the ride from Cuckoo Tavern to warn Thomas Jefferson and others that Tarleton and his men were on their way to arrest him for crimes against the king; Reverend John Gano, a Revolutionary War chaplain and spiritual advisor to George Washington; Francis Marion; and a number of other leaders of the American Revolution and later statesmen. The last active Huguenot congregation in North America worships in Charleston, South Carolina, at a church that dates to 1844. The Huguenot Society of America maintains the Manakin Episcopal Church in Virginia as a historic shrine with occasional services. The Society has chapters in numerous states, with the one in Texas being the largest.

After the British Conquest of New France, British authorities in Lower Canada tried to encourage Huguenot immigration in an attempt to promote a Francophone Protestant Church in the region, hoping that French-speaking Protestants would be more loyal clergy than those of Roman Catholicism. While a small number of Huguenots did come, the majority switched from speaking French to English. As a result, Protestants are still a religious minority in Quebec today.

==== Spoken language ====
The Huguenots originally spoke French when they arrived in the American colonies, but after two or three generations, they had switched to English. They did not promote French-language schools or publications and "lost" their historic identity. In upstate New York, they merged with the Dutch Reformed community and switched first to Dutch and then, according to church records, to English by around 1800. In colonial New York City, they switched from French to English or Dutch by 1730.

=== Netherlands ===
Some Huguenots fought in the Low Countries alongside the Dutch against Spain during the first years of the Dutch Revolt (1568–1609). The Dutch Republic rapidly became a destination for Huguenot exiles. Early ties were already visible in the Apologie of William the Silent, condemning the Spanish Inquisition, which was written by his court minister, the Huguenot Pierre L'Oyseleur, lord of Villiers. Louise de Coligny, daughter of the murdered Huguenot leader Gaspard II de Coligny, married William the Silent, leader of the Dutch (Calvinist) revolt against Spanish (Catholic) rule. As both spoke French in daily life, their court church in the Prinsenhof in Delft held services in French. The practice has continued to the present day. The Prinsenhof is one of the 14 active Walloon churches of the Dutch Reformed Church (now of the Protestant Church in the Netherlands). The ties between Huguenots and the Dutch Republic's military and political leadership, the House of Orange-Nassau, which existed since the early days of the Dutch Revolt, helped support the many early settlements of Huguenots in the Dutch Republic's colonies. They settled at the Cape of Good Hope in South Africa and New Netherland in North America.

Stadtholder William III of Orange, who later became King of England, emerged as the strongest opponent of King Louis XIV after the French attacked the Dutch Republic in 1672. William formed the League of Augsburg as a coalition to oppose Louis and the French state. Consequently, many Huguenots considered the wealthy and Calvinist-controlled Dutch Republic, which also happened to lead the opposition to Louis XIV, as the most attractive country for exile after the revocation of the Edict of Nantes. They also found many French-speaking Calvinist churches there (which were called the "Walloon churches").

After the revocation of the Edict of Nantes in 1685, the Dutch Republic received the largest group of Huguenot refugees, an estimated total of 75,000 to 100,000 people. This was a huge influx, as the entire population of the Dutch Republic amounted to c. 2 million at that time. In 1705, Amsterdam and the area of West Frisia were the first areas to provide full citizenship rights to Huguenot immigrants, followed by the whole Dutch Republic in 1715. Huguenots intermarried with Dutch from the outset.

One of the most prominent Huguenot refugees in the Netherlands was Pierre Bayle. He started teaching in Rotterdam, where he finished writing and publishing his multi-volume masterpiece, Historical and Critical Dictionary. It became one of the 100 foundational texts of the United States Library of Congress. Some Huguenot descendants in the Netherlands may be noted by French family names, although they typically use Dutch given names. Due to the Huguenots' early ties with the leadership of the Dutch Revolt and their own participation, some of the Dutch patriciate are of part-Huguenot descent. Some Huguenot families have kept alive various traditions, such as the celebration and feast of their patron Saint Nicolas, similar to the Dutch Sint Nicolaas (Sinterklaas) feast.

=== Great Britain and Ireland ===
==== England ====
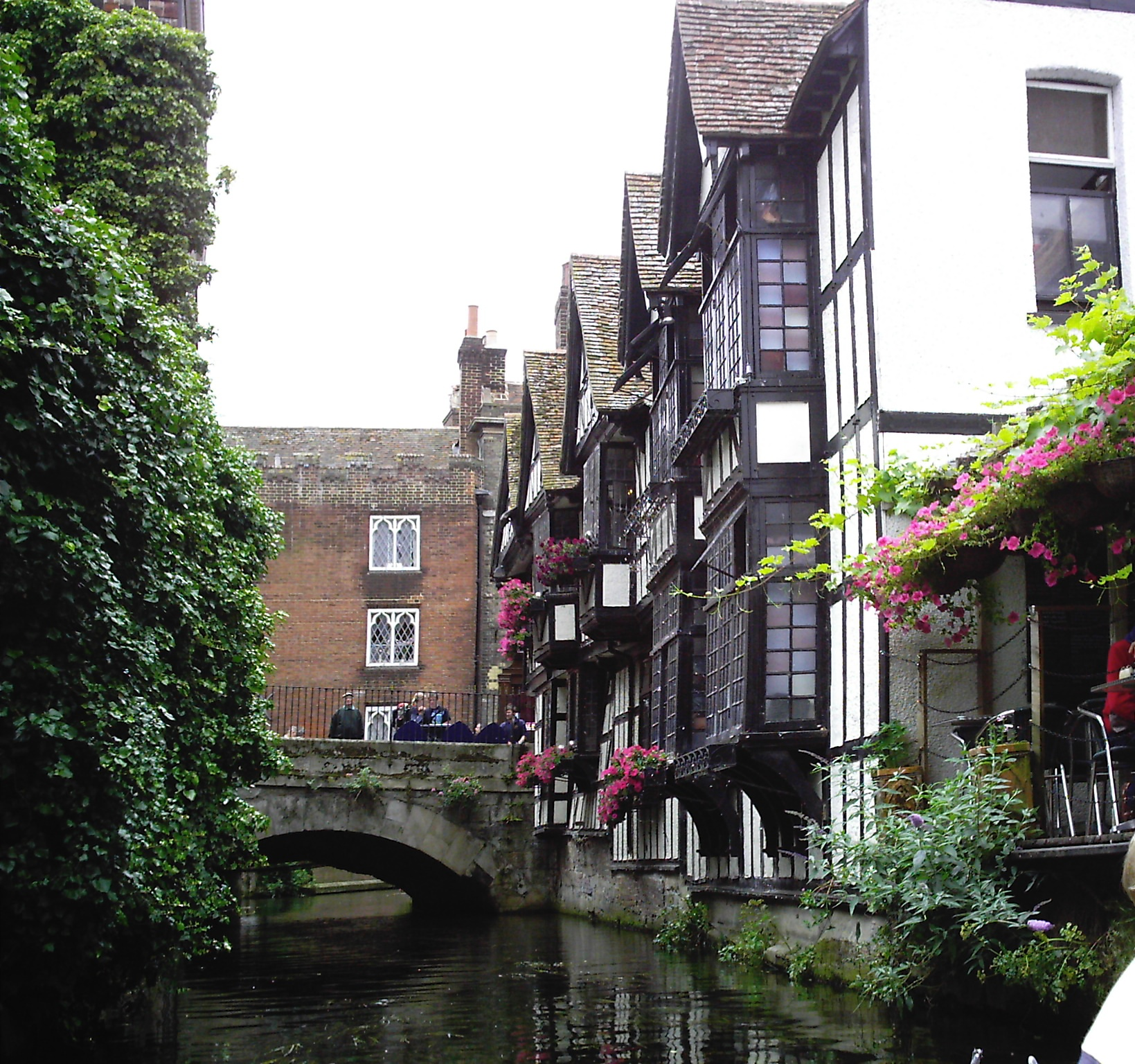
Huguenot weavers' houses at Canterbury

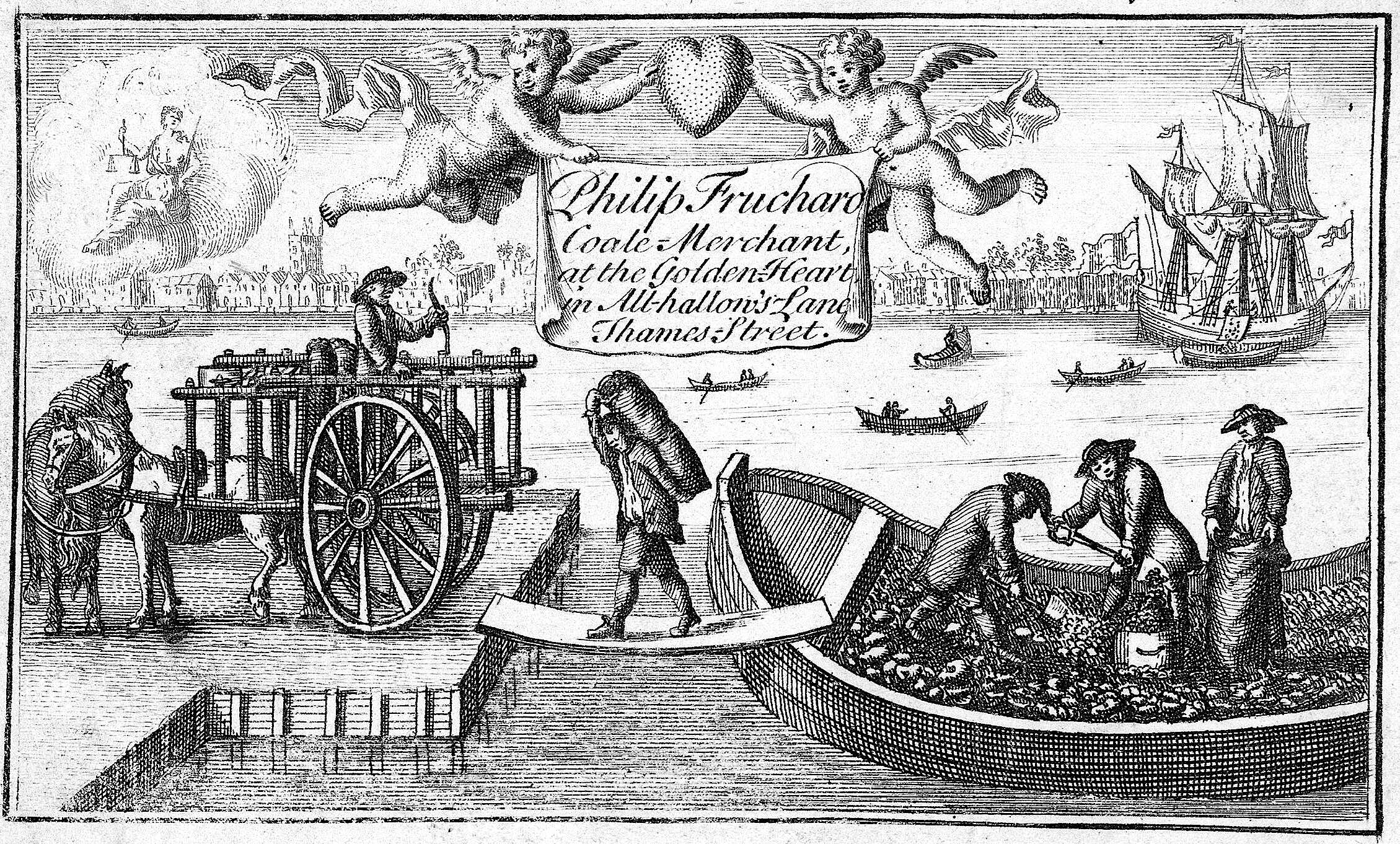
Trade card for Philip Fruchard, a Huguenot coal merchant in London

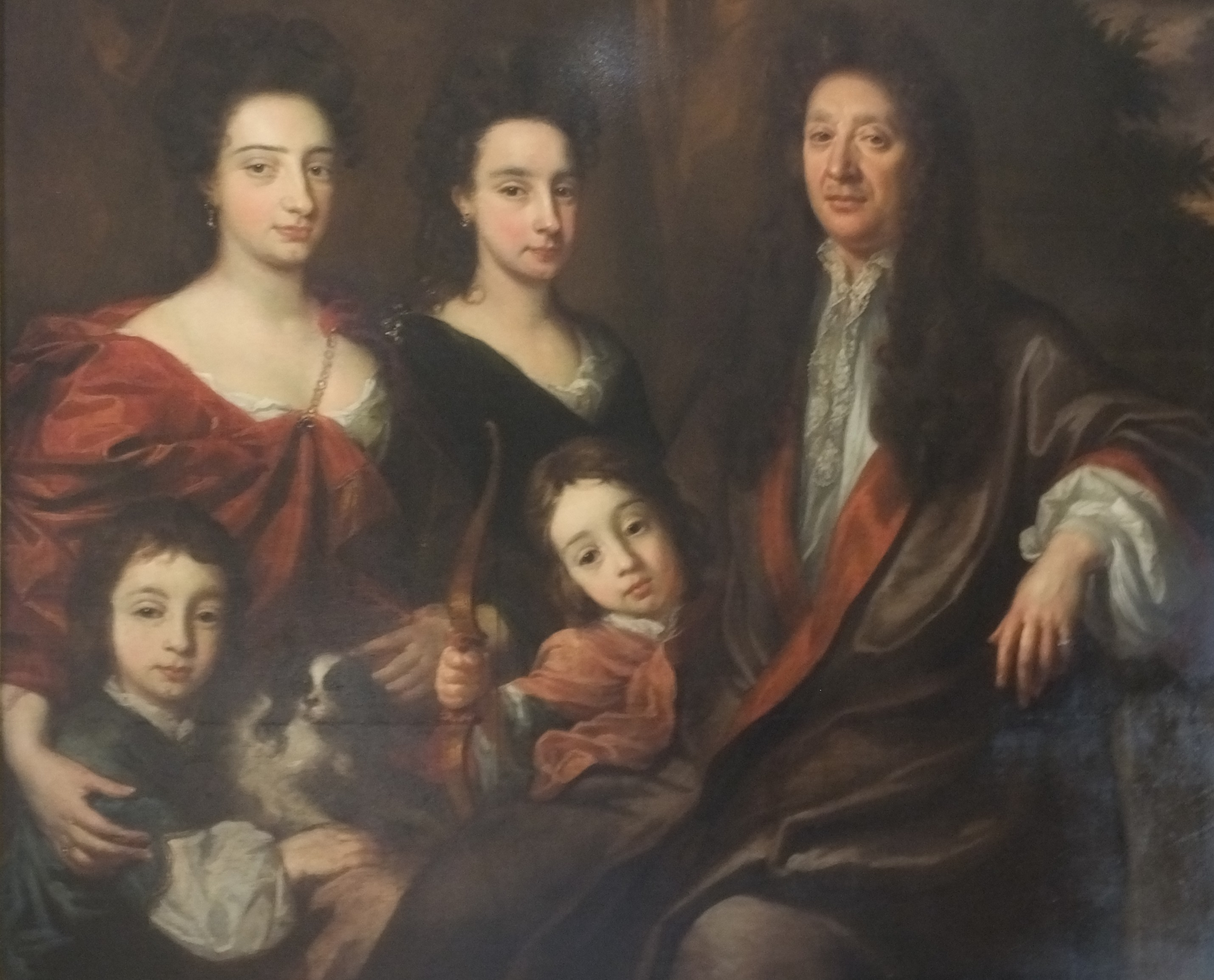
Portrait of a Huguenot family in England

As a major Protestant nation, England patronized and helped protect Huguenots since at least the mid-1500s. Kent hosted the first congregation of Huguenots in England around 1548. During the reign of Mary I (1553–1558) they were expelled but, with the accession of Elizabeth I, returned to London in 1559 and Kent in 1561. An early group of Huguenots settled in Colchester in 1565. There was a small naval Anglo-French War (1627–1629), in which the English supported the French Huguenots against King Louis XIII. London financed the emigration of many to England and its colonies around 1700. Some 40,000–50,000 settled in England, mostly in towns near the sea in the southern districts, with the largest concentration in London where they constituted about 5% of the total population in 1700. Many others went to the American colonies, especially South Carolina. The immigrants included many skilled craftsmen and entrepreneurs who facilitated the economic modernization of their new home, in an era when economic innovations were transferred by people rather than through printed works. The British government ignored the complaints made by local craftsmen about the favoritism shown to foreigners. The immigrants assimilated well in terms of using English, joining the Church of England, intermarriage and business success. They founded the silk industry in England. Many became private tutors, schoolmasters, travelling tutors and owners of riding schools, where they were hired by the upper class.

Both before and after the 1708 passage of the Foreign Protestants Naturalization Act, an estimated 50,000 Protestant Walloons and French Huguenots fled to England, with many moving on to Ireland and elsewhere. In relative terms, this was one of the largest waves of immigration ever of a single ethnic community to Britain. Andrew Lortie (born André Lortie), a leading Huguenot theologian and writer who led the exiled community in London, became known for articulating their criticism of the Pope and the doctrine of transubstantiation during Mass.

Of the refugees who arrived on the Kent coast, many gravitated towards Canterbury, then the county's Calvinist hub. Many Walloon and Huguenot families were granted asylum there. Edward VI granted them the whole of the western crypt of Canterbury Cathedral for worship. In 1825, this privilege was reduced to the south aisle and in 1895 to the former chantry chapel of the Black Prince. Services are still held there in French according to the Reformed tradition every Sunday at 15:00.

Other evidence of the Walloons and Huguenots in Canterbury includes a block of houses in Turnagain Lane, where weavers' windows survive on the top floor, as many Huguenots worked as weavers. The Weavers, a half-timbered house by the river, was the site of a weaving school from around 1574 to about 1830. (It has been adapted as a restaurant — see illustration above. The house derives its name from a weaving school which was moved there in 1899, reviving an earlier use.) Other refugees practiced a variety of occupations necessary to sustain the community as distinct from the indigenous population. Such economic separation was the condition of the refugees' initial acceptance in the city. They also settled elsewhere in Kent, particularly Sandwich, Faversham and Maidstone — towns in which there used to be refugee churches.

The French Protestant Church of London was established by Royal Charter in 1550. It is now located at Soho Square. Huguenot refugees flocked to Shoreditch, London. They established a major weaving industry in and around Spitalfields (see Petticoat Lane and the Tenterground) in East London. In Wandsworth, their gardening skills benefited the Battersea market gardens. The flight of Huguenot refugees from Tours, France drew off most of the workers of its great silk mills, which they had built. Some of these immigrants moved to Norwich, which had accommodated an earlier settlement of Walloon weavers. The French added to the existing immigrant population, then comprising about a third of the population of the city.

Some Huguenots settled in Bedfordshire, one of the main centres of the British lace industry at the time. Although some sources have asserted that some of these refugees were lacemakers and contributed to the East Midlands lace industry, this is contentious. The only reference to immigrant lace makers in this period is of twenty-five widows who settled in Dover, and there is no contemporary documentation to support there being Huguenot lace makers in Bedfordshire. The implication that the style of lace known as "Bucks Point" demonstrates a Huguenot influence, being a "combination of Mechlin patterns on Lille ground", is fallacious: what is now known as Mechlin lace did not develop until the 1690s and lace with Mechlin patterns and Lille ground did not appear until c. 1770s–1790s, when it later became widely copied throughout Europe.

Many Huguenots from the Lorraine region also eventually settled in the area around Stourbridge in the modern-day West Midlands, where they found the raw materials and fuel to continue their glassmaking tradition. Anglicised names such as Tyzack, Henzey and Tittery are regularly found amongst the early glassmakers, and the region went on to become one of the most important glass regions in the country.

Winston Churchill was the most prominent Briton of Huguenot descent, deriving from the Huguenots who went to the colonies; his American grandfather was Leonard Jerome.

==== Ireland ====
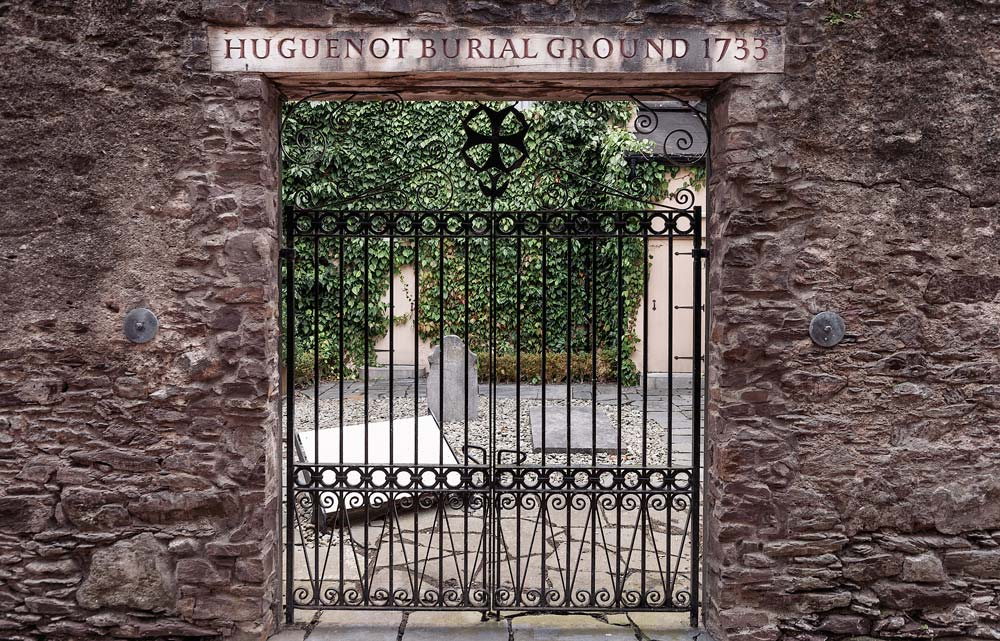
Entrance to the Huguenot Cemetery in Cork city

Following the French Crown's revocation of the Edict of Nantes in 1598, many Huguenots settled in Ireland, encouraged by an act of Parliament in 1662 for Protestants settling in Ireland. Huguenot regiments fought for William of Orange in the Williamite War in Ireland, for which they were rewarded with land grants and titles, many settling in Dublin. Significant Huguenot settlements were in Dublin, Cork, Portarlington, Lisburn, Waterford and Youghal. Smaller settlements, which included Killeshandra in County Cavan, contributed to the expansion of flax cultivation and the growth of the Irish linen industry.

For over 150 years, Huguenots were allowed to hold their services in the Lady Chapel in St. Patrick's Cathedral. A Huguenot cemetery is located in the centre of Dublin, off St. Stephen's Green. Prior to its establishment, Huguenots used the Cabbage Garden near the cathedral. Another Huguenot cemetery is located off French Church Street in Cork.

A number of Huguenots served as mayors in Dublin (1666–1667 and 1669–1670), Cork (1662, 1682), Youghal (1683, 1721 and 1752) and Waterford. Numerous signs of Huguenot presence can still be seen, with names still in use, and with areas of the main towns and cities named after the people who settled there. Examples include the Huguenot District and French Church Street in Cork City; and D'Olier Street in Dublin, named after a High Sheriff and one of the founders of the Bank of Ireland. A French church in Portarlington dates back to 1696, and was built to serve the significant new Huguenot community in the town. At the time, they constituted the majority of the townspeople.

One of the more notable Huguenot descendants in Ireland was Seán Lemass (1899–1971), who was appointed as Taoiseach, serving from 1959 until 1966. Additionally, Irish Gothic author Joseph Sheridan Le Fanu (1814–1873) was of Huguenot descent.

==== Scotland ====
With the precedent of a historical alliance — the Auld Alliance — between Scotland and France, Huguenots were mostly welcomed to, and found refuge in, the nation from around the year 1700. Although they did not settle in Scotland in such significant numbers as in other regions of Britain and Ireland, Huguenots have been romanticised and are generally considered to have contributed greatly to Scottish culture. John Arnold Fleming wrote extensively of the French Protestant group's impact on the nation in his 1953 Huguenot Influence in Scotland, while sociologist Abraham Lavender, who has explored how the ethnic group transformed over generations "from Mediterranean Catholics to White Anglo-Saxon Protestants", has analyzed how Huguenot adherence to Calvinist customs helped facilitate compatibility with the Scottish people.

==== Wales ====
A number of French Huguenots settled in Wales, in the upper Rhymney valley of the current Caerphilly County Borough. The community they created there is still known as Fleur de Lys (the symbol of France), an unusual French village name in the heart of the valleys of Wales. Nearby villages are Hengoed, and Ystrad Mynach. Apart from the French village name and that of the local rugby team, Fleur De Lys RFC, little remains of the French heritage.

=== Germany and Scandinavia ===
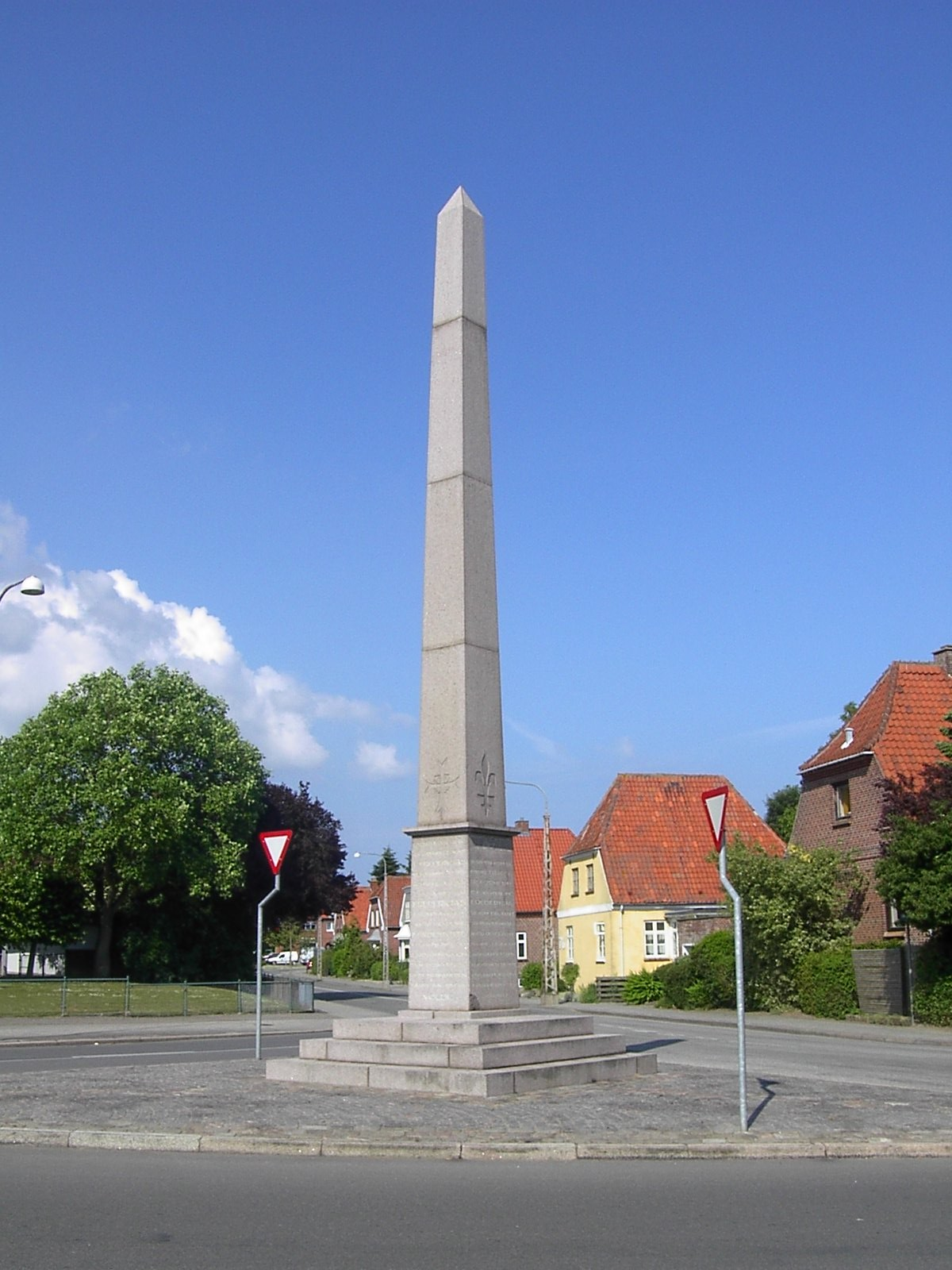
Obelisk commemorating the Huguenots in Fredericia, Denmark

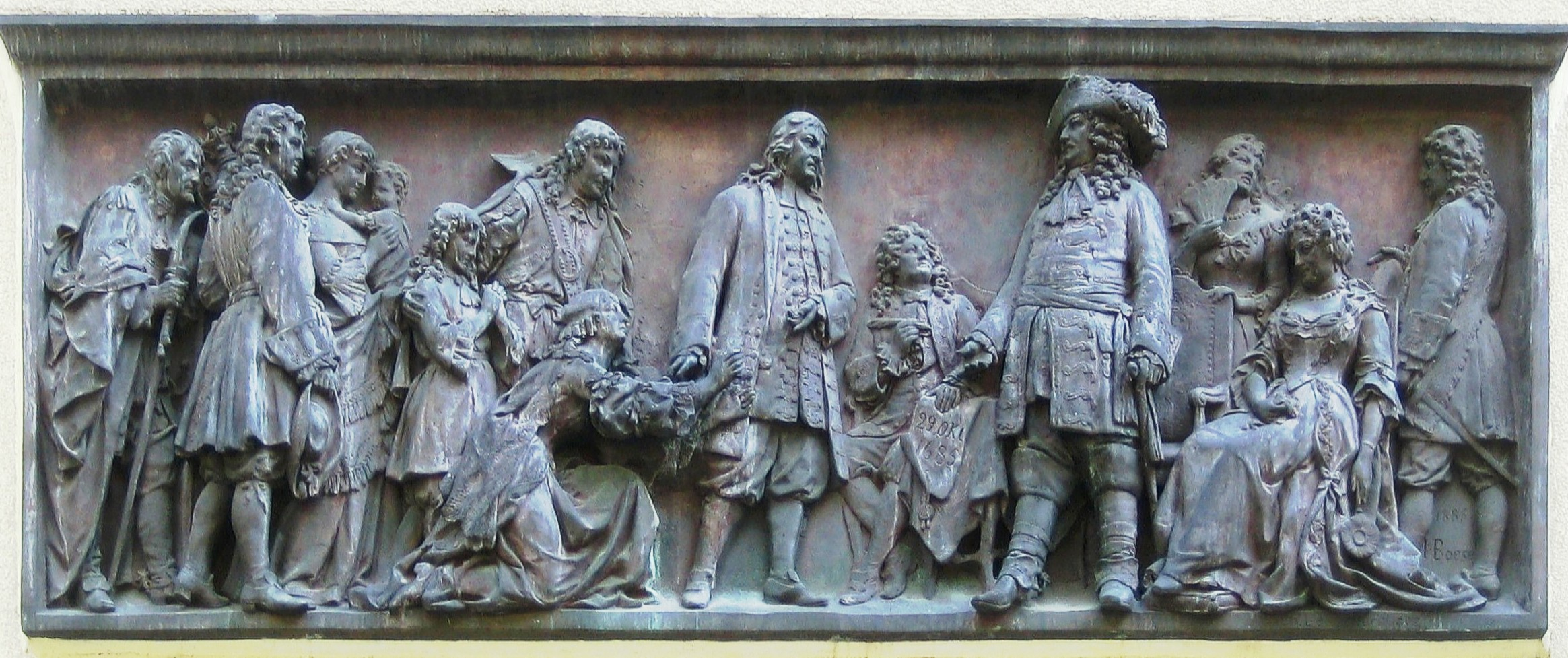
Relief by Johannes Boese, 1885: The Great Prince-elector of Brandenburg-Prussia welcomes arriving Huguenots

Around 1685, Huguenot refugees found a haven in the Lutheran and Reformed states in Germany and Scandinavia. Nearly 50,000 Huguenots established themselves in Germany, 20,000 of whom were welcomed in Brandenburg-Prussia, where Frederick William (r. 1640–1688), granted them special privileges (Edict of Potsdam of 1685) and churches in which to worship (such as the Church of St. Peter and St. Paul, Angermünde and the French Church, Berlin). The Huguenots furnished two new regiments of his army: the Altpreußische Infantry Regiments No. 13 (Regiment on foot Varenne) and 15 (Regiment on foot Wylich). Another 4,000 Huguenots settled in the German territories of Baden, Franconia (Principality of Bayreuth, Principality of Ansbach), Landgraviate of Hesse-Kassel, Duchy of Württemberg, in the Wetterau Association of Imperial Counts, in the Palatinate and Palatine Zweibrücken, in the Rhine-Main-Area (Frankfurt), in modern-day Saarland; and 1,500 found refuge in Hamburg, Bremen and Lower Saxony. Three hundred refugees were granted asylum at the court of George William, Duke of Brunswick-Lüneburg in Celle.

In Berlin, the Huguenots created two new neighborhoods: Dorotheenstadt and Friedrichstadt. By 1700 one fifth of the city's population was French-speaking. The Berlin Huguenots preserved the French language in their church services for over 100 years. They ultimately decided to switch to German in protest against the occupation of Prussia by Napoleon in 1806–1807. Many of their descendants rose to positions of prominence. Several congregations were founded throughout Germany and Scandinavia, such as those of Fredericia (Denmark), Berlin, Stockholm, Hamburg, Frankfurt, Helsinki, and Emden.

Prince Louis de Condé, along with his sons Daniel and Osias, arranged with Count Ludwig von Nassau-Saarbrücken to establish a Huguenot community in present-day Saarland in 1604. The Count supported mercantilism and welcomed technically skilled immigrants into his lands, regardless of their religion. The Condés established a thriving glass-making works, which provided wealth to the principality for many years. Other founding families created enterprises based on textiles and such traditional Huguenot occupations in France. The community and its congregation remain active to this day, with descendants of many of the founding families still living in the region. Some members of this community emigrated to the United States in the 1890s.

In Bad Karlshafen, Hessen, Germany, is the Huguenot Museum and Huguenot archive. The collection includes family histories, a library, and a picture archive.

=== Poland ===
After the St. Bartholomew's Day massacre of 1572, some persecuted Huguenots fled to Poland, taking advantage of its religious tolerance confirmed by the Warsaw Confederation, marking the first significant historical wave of French migration to Poland.

=== Effects ===
The exodus of Huguenots from France created a brain drain, as many of them had occupied important places in society. The kingdom did not fully recover for years. The French crown's refusal to allow non-Catholics to settle in New France may help to explain that colony's low population compared to that of the neighboring British colonies, which opened settlement to religious dissenters. By the start of the French and Indian War, the North American front of the Seven Years' War, a sizeable population of Huguenot descent lived in the British colonies, and many participated in the British defeat of New France in 1759–1760.

Frederick William, Elector of Brandenburg, invited Huguenots to settle in his realms, and a number of their descendants rose to positions of prominence in Prussia. Several prominent German military, cultural and political figures were ethnic Huguenots, including the poet Theodor Fontane, General Hermann von François, the hero of the First World War's Battle of Tannenberg, Luftwaffe general and fighter ace Adolf Galland, the Luftwaffe flying ace Hans-Joachim Marseille, WWII Wehrmacht Lieutenant Colonel/Inspector General of the Bundeswehr Ulrich de Maizière and the famed U-boat Captains Lothar von Arnauld de la Perière and Wilhelm Souchon. Related to Ulrich de Maizière were also the last prime minister of East Germany, Lothar de Maizière and the former German Federal Minister of the Interior, Thomas de Maizière. A 2014 study in the American Economic Review linked Huguenot migration to Prussia with a boost in industrial productivity.

The persecution and the flight of the Huguenots greatly damaged the reputation of Louis XIV abroad, particularly in England. Both kingdoms, which had enjoyed peaceful relations until 1685, became bitter enemies and fought each other in a series of wars, called the "Second Hundred Years' War" by some historians, from 1689 onward.

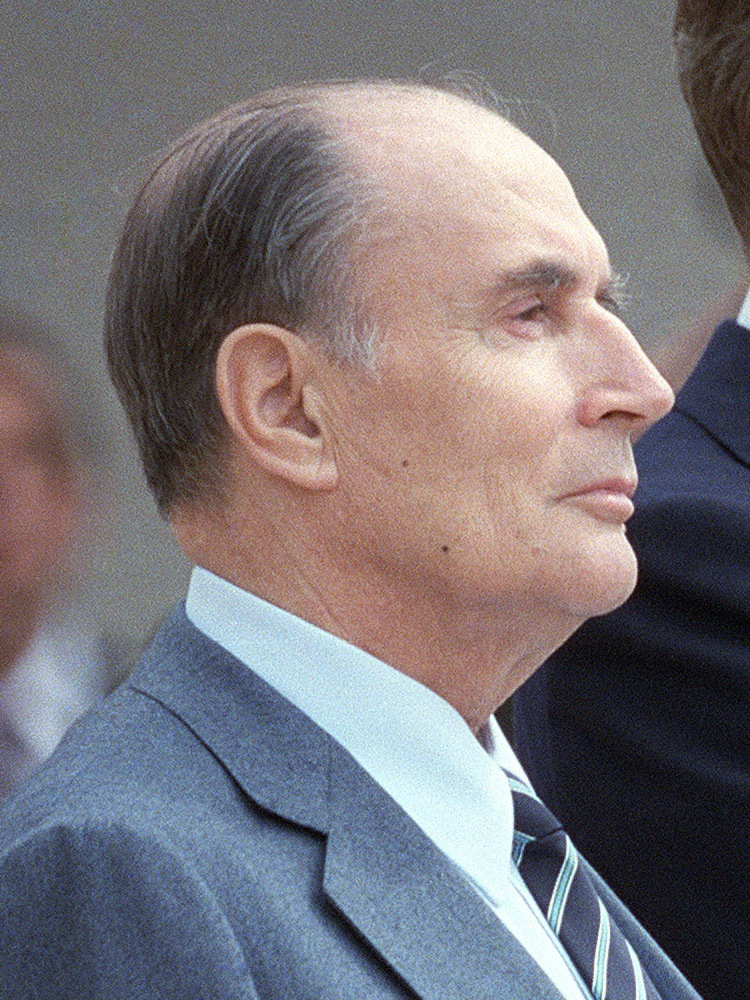
François Mitterrand issued a formal apology to the Huguenots on behalf of France in 1985.

== 1985 apology ==
In October 1985, to commemorate the tricentenary of the Revocation of the Edict of Nantes, President François Mitterrand of France announced a formal apology to the descendants of Huguenots around the world. At the same time, the government released a special postage stamp in their honour reading "France is the home of the Huguenots" (Accueil des Huguenots).

== Legacy ==
Huguenots' legacy persists both in France and abroad.

=== The Huguenots of Geneva's French Protestant Utopia and its influence on Western economic thought ===
The Genevan utopian tradition, rooted in French Calvinism, combined religious conviction with civic responsibility, laying early groundwork for modern capitalism and welfare economics. Max Weber famously identified the Calvinist "Protestant ethic" as foundational to capitalist development. In Geneva, communal support, education, and moral discipline informed a civic model that inspired Enlightenment thinkers and later economic theorists. As Huguenot ideals spread to Protestant regions, they influenced American and European welfare institutions. Thinkers like J.S. Mill and Karl Marx reinterpreted this moral framework, promoting visions of economic justice. In the U.S., similar values are enshrined in the Constitution's call to "promote the general Welfare". The legacy of Genevan utopianism persists in debates over ethical capitalism, redistribution, and social policy.

=== France ===
Several French Protestant churches are descended from or tied to the Huguenots, including:

- Reformed Church of France (l'Église Réformée de France), founded in 1559, the historical and principal Reformed church in France since the Protestant Reformation until its 2013 merger into the United Protestant Church of France;
- Evangelical Reformed Church of France (Union nationale des églises protestantes réformées évangéliques de France), founded in 1938;
- Some French members of the largely German Protestant Reformed Church of Alsace and Lorraine.

=== United States ===
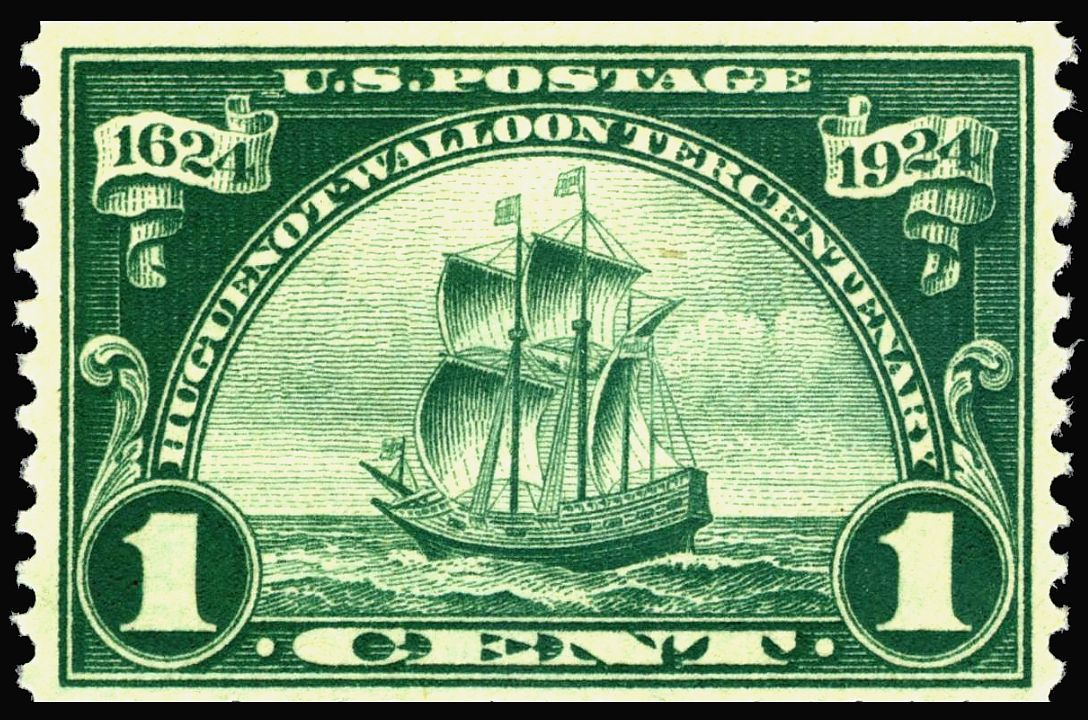
The United States Post Office issued the Huguenot-Walloon Tercentenary, released May 1, 1924, commemorating the 300th anniversary of settlement in New Netherlands, (now State of New York).

- Bayonne, New Jersey
- Four-term Republican United States Representative Howard Homan Buffett was of Huguenot descent.
- Charleston, South Carolina, is home to the only active Huguenot congregation in the United States
- John Sevier, the first governor of the state of Tennessee, and the only governor of the State of Franklin was of Huguenot descent.
- In 1924, the US issued a commemorative half dollar, known as the "Huguenot-Walloon half dollar", to celebrate the 300th anniversary of the Huguenots' settlement in what is now the United States.
- Frenchtown, New Jersey, part of the larger Delaware River Valley, was a settling area in the early 1700s.
- The neighborhood of Huguenot in New York City's borough of Staten Island, straddling Huguenot Avenue
- Huguenot Memorial Park in Jacksonville, Florida.
- The early leaders John Jay and Paul Revere were of Huguenot descent.
- Francis Marion, an American Revolutionary War guerrilla fighter in South Carolina, was of predominantly Huguenot ancestry.
- New Paltz, New York
- New Rochelle, New York, named for the city of La Rochelle, a known former Huguenot stronghold in France. The Huguenot and Historical Association of New Rochelle was organised in 1885 for the purpose of perpetuating the history of its original Huguenot settlers. The mascot of New Rochelle High School is the Huguenot, and one of the main streets in the city is called Huguenot Street.
- John Pintard (1759–1854), a descendant of Huguenots and a prosperous New York City merchant who was involved in various New York City organisations. Pintard was credited with establishing the modern conception of Santa Claus.
- Arthur C. Mellette (23 June 1842 – 25 May 1896), the last governor of the Dakota territory and the first governor of South Dakota, was of Huguenot descent.
- Charles Shumway (1806–1898), an early member of the Church of Jesus Christ of Latter-day Saints, member of the Council of Fifty and part of the Utah Legislature for one term in 1851, was a descendant of Huguenot settlers.
- In Richmond, Virginia, and the neighboring Chesterfield County, there is a Huguenot Road. A Huguenot High School in Richmond and Huguenot Park in Chesterfield County, along with several other uses of the name throughout the region, commemorate the early refugee settlers.
- The Manakintown Episcopal Church in Midlothian, Virginia serves as a National Huguenot Memorial.
- Walloon Settlers Memorial (located in Battery Park) is a monument given to the City of New York by the Belgian Province of Hainaut in honor of the inspiration of Jessé de Forest in founding New York City. Baron de Cartier de Marchienne, representing the government and Albert I, King of Belgium, presented the monument to Mayor John F. Hylan for the City of New York on 18 May 1924.
- Oxford, Massachusetts

=== England ===
- There is a Huguenot society in London, as well as a French Protestant Church of London, founded in 1550 in Soho Square, which is still active, and has also been a registered charity since 1926.
- Huguenots of Spitalfields is a registered charity promoting public understanding of the Huguenot heritage and culture in Spitalfields, the City of London and beyond. They arrange tours, talks, events and school programmes to raise the Huguenot profile in Spitalfields and raise funds for a permanent memorial to the Huguenots.
- Huguenot Place in Wandsworth is named after the Huguenot Burial Site or Mount Nod Cemetery, which was used by the Huguenots living in the area. The site was in use from 1687 to 1854 and graves can still be observed today.
- Canterbury Cathedral retains a Huguenot Chapel in the "Black Prince's Chantry", part of the Crypt which is accessible from the exterior of the cathedral. The chapel was granted to Huguenot refugees on the orders of Queen Elizabeth I in 1575. To this day, the chapel still holds services in French every Sunday at 15:00.
- Strangers' Hall in Norwich got its name from the Protestant refugees from the Spanish Netherlands who settled in the city from 1565 onwards and were referred to by the locals as the "Strangers". The Strangers brought with them their pet canaries, and over time the birds became synonymous with the city. In 1907 Norwich City F.C. adopted the canary as their nickname, and in 1922 as their emblem.

=== Prussia ===
- Huguenot refugees in Prussia are thought to have contributed significantly to the development of many new industries, such as the textile industry. One notable example was Marthe de Roucoulle, governess of Prussian kings Frederick William I and Frederick the Great.
- Many prominent Germans descend from the Huguenots, such as the poets Theodor Fontane and Friedrich de la Motte Fouqué, or the politician Lothar de Maiziere.
- Berlin in particular was heavily influenced by the Huguenots, who made up more than 20% of the city at their peak. Several institutions, companies, city neighbourhoods and words in the Berlin dialect trace their roots back to the Huguenots. The neighbourhood of Moabit, for instance, was named by the Huguenots after the biblical Moab, to represent finding refuge in a foreign land.

=== Ireland ===
- Sean Francis Lemass, Taoiseach of Ireland from 1959 to 1966, was of Huguenot descent.
- The poet Samuel Beckett was also of Huguenot descent.

=== South Africa ===
- Most South African Huguenots settled in the Cape Colony, where they became assimilated into the Afrikaner and Afrikaans population. Many modern Afrikaners have French surnames, which are given Afrikaans pronunciation and orthography. The early immigrants settled in Franschhoek ("French Corner") near Cape Town. The Huguenots contributed greatly to the wine industry in South Africa.

=== Australia ===
- The majority of Australians with French ancestry are descended from Huguenots. Some of the earliest to arrive in Australia held prominent positions in English society, notably Jane Franklin and Charles La Trobe.
- Others who came later were from poorer families, migrating from England in the 19th and early 20th centuries to escape the poverty of London's East End Huguenot enclaves of Spitalfields and Bethnal Green. Their impoverishment had been brought on by the Industrial Revolution, which caused the collapse of the Huguenot-dominated silk-weaving industry. Many French Australian descendants of Huguenots still consider themselves very much Huguenots or French, even now.

== See also ==
- Bible translations into French
- French Confession of Faith
- Guillebeau House
- Industrial Revolution
- Les Huguenots (opera)
- List of people with Huguenot ancestry
- Salzburg Protestants – German Protestants expelled from the Archbishopric of Salzburg
- Temple of the Holy Spirit, Besançon
