= Besançon Hugues =

Swiss political and religious leader

Besançon Hugues (French pronunciation: [bəzɑ̃sɔ̃ yɡ]; 1487 – 1532) was a Swiss political and religious leader who was a member of the Grand Council of Geneva. He participated in the rebellion against the rule of the Savoy dynasty, which led to the independence of Geneva in 1526.

He entered the powerful lesser council (Petit Conseil) in 1515, taking over the leadership of the pro-independence faction in the Grand Council of Geneva from Philibert Berthelier in 1517.

Following the invasion of Geneva by Savoy forces in September 1525, Hugues fled to Fribourg, from which he continued the rebellion which proved successful the following year. Following the overthrow of Savoy rule over Geneva, he strove to protect the Catholic Church in Geneva and to prevent the spread of the Protestant Reformation in his city.

Following the attainment of independence in 1526, Hugues supported the holding of fair trial proceedings for the supporters of the Savoy dynasty within Geneva. From about 1527 onward, he began to sympathize with the Protestant faction in Geneva. On 20 February 1532, he resigned his seat at the Grand Council of Geneva and died of an illness soon thereafter. After his resignation he unsuccessfully tried to restore the Catholic bishop of Geneva Pierre de la Baume.

His brother Guillaume Hugues was also a Grand Council member but was more positive towards the Protestants.

When resigning his posts in 1532, he cited family problems as the reason for this, but some scholars have suggested the real reason being his inability to cooperate with Protestants.

== See also ==
- Huguenots#Etymology
