= Weavers' windows =

Type of window

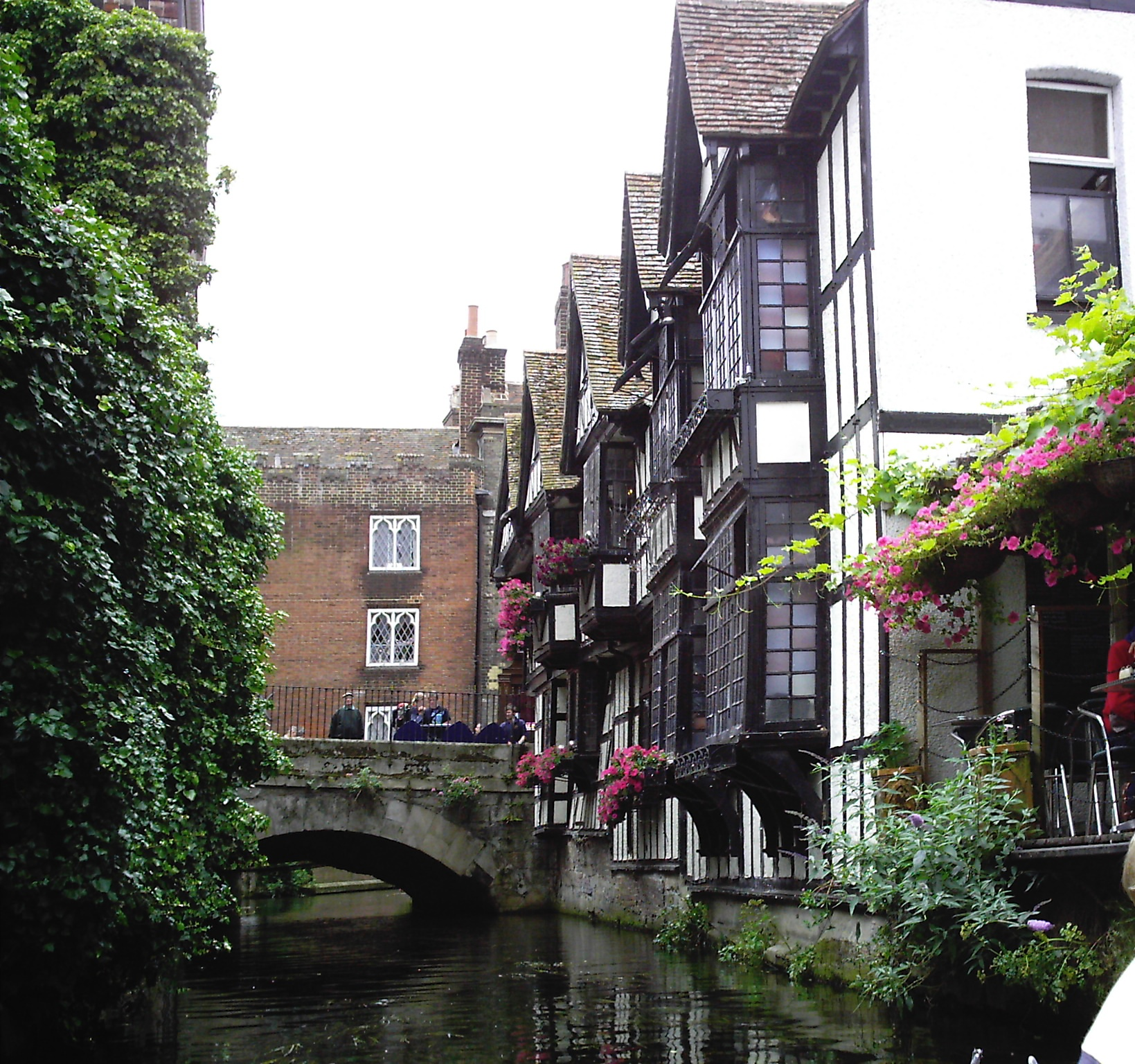
Huguenot weavers' houses at Canterbury

Weavers' windows are large horizontal windows on the top floor of a weavers' cottage that allowed the residents light to weave. Weavers' windows are associated with the Huguenot migration to Britain and Ireland.

== Overview ==
Before the Industrial Revolution, weaving was carried out in the homes of weavers, and their looms were typically on the top floor of their dwellings, lit by "Weavers' windows", long windows that admitted the most sunlight. Weavers' windows were also called "lights".

== Quote ==
In chapter 17 of A Child of the Jago Arthur Morrison wrote:

And the wreckers tore down the foul old houses, laying bare the secret dens of a century of infamy; lifting out the wide sashes of the old ‘weavers’ windows’— the one good feature in the structures letting light and air at last into the subterraneous basements where men and women had swarmed, and bred, and died, like wolves in their lairs.
