= Joggie Viljoen (rugby union, born 1976) =

South African rugby union footballer

- Born: Roelof Viljoen; 22 July 1976 (age 50) Port Elizabeth, Eastern Cape
- Height: 1.75 m (5 ft 9 in)
- Weight: 78 kg (172 lb)
- School: Framesby High School, Port Elizabeth
- Notable relative: Joggie Viljoen (father)

Rugby union career
- Position: Scrumhalf
Provincial / State sides
Years	Team	Apps	(Points)
1995	Northern Transvaal	1	(5)
1996–1999	Western Province	43	(55)
1999–2000	Northland	15	(5)
2001	South Western Districts	14	(15)
2002–2006	Falcons	54	(25)
2007–2008	Manawatu	27	
Super Rugby
Years	Team	Apps	(Points)
1998–99, 2001	Stormers	17	(25)
2000	Hurricanes	7	(0)

Roelof 'Joggie' Viljoen (born 22 July 1976) is a South African rugby union footballer who played at scrum-half for the South Africa national rugby union team during the late 1990s. Viljoen, a native of South Africa's Eastern Cape Province, currently resides in New Zealand.

== Playing career ==
As a schoolboy, Viljoen represented the Eastern Province at three consecutive Craven Week tournaments, from 1992 to 1994 and was selected for the South African Schools team in 1993 and 1994. He started his senior career in 1995 with Northern Transvaal, playing one game for the union. He then moved to Western Province, followed by Northland in New Zealand and back in South Africa with South Western Districts and finally the Falcons. He also played Super Rugby for the Stormers and the Hurricanes. In late 2006, Viljoen moved again to New Zealand where he was the first choice scrum-half for Manawatu in the NPC.

Viljoen toured Argentina and Europe with the Springboks at the end of the 1996 season. He did not play in any test matches but played in three tour matches for the Springboks.

== See also ==
- List of South Africa national rugby union players – Springbok no. 644
