= Huguenot Cemetery, Cork =

Cemetery in Cork, Ireland

Huguenot Cemetery
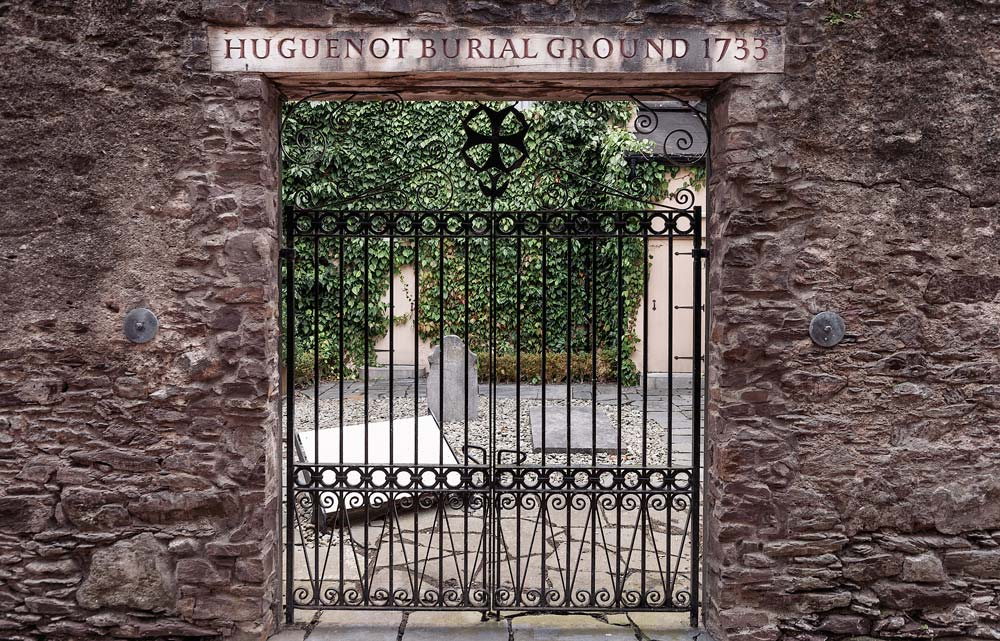
- Cemetery entrance on French Church Street

- Location within Ireland

Religion
- Affiliation: Huguenot
- Ecclesiastical or organizational status: Closed

Location
- Location: Cork, Ireland
- Interactive map of Huguenot Cemetery
- Coordinates: 51°53′55″N 8°28′25″W

Architecture
- Completed: 1710–1733

The Huguenot Cemetery was created between 1710 and 1733 as a cemetery for the Huguenot inhabitants in the city of Cork in Ireland. It is believed to be one of the last two surviving Huguenot graveyards in western Europe. The cemetery is recorded in the Record of Monuments and Places and included in an Architectural Conservation Area designated by Cork City Council.

== History ==
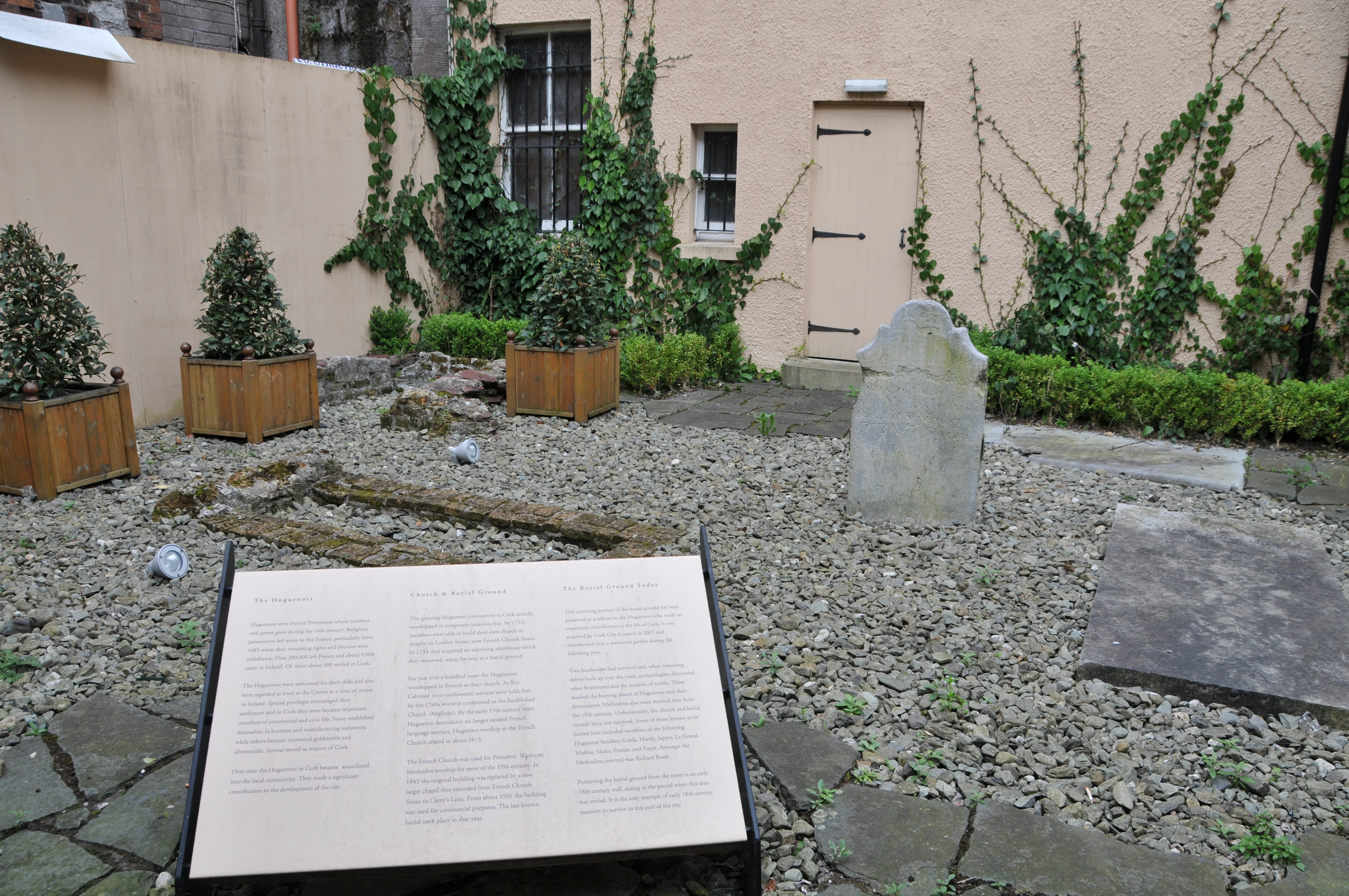
Markers within the Huguenot graveyard (2012)

Following the revocation of the Edict of Nantes in 1685, about 5,000 Huguenots came to Ireland to flee religious persecution in their native France. Approximately 300 of these refugees had settled in Cork by the late 17th century. A Huguenot quarter was established in the city, in the area of Lumley Street, now known as French Church Street. The Huguenot community built a school, an almshouse and graveyard.

The graveyard, which dates to between 1710 and 1733, is home to the remains of some of the most prominent Huguenots of the city. It is understood that the remains of at least one former Lord Mayor of Cork are held within. The last recorded use of the graveyard for burial was in 1901.

The cemetery, which was acquired by Cork City Council in 2006, was restored by the council from 2007.
