= Viljoen =

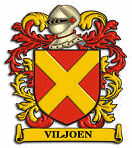
Viljoen coat-of-arms (unregistered).

Viljoen is an Afrikaans surname, derived from the French Villion. It was brought to South Africa in 1671 by French Huguenots who subsequently intermarried with the local Dutch population. The progenitors of the extended Viljoen clan are François Villion (born in Clermont, France) and Cornelia Campenaar (born in Middelburg, Netherlands). Married in the Cape of Good Hope, they later farmed for a living near Stellenbosch.

- Annari Viljoen (born 1987), South African badminton player
- Barend Viljoen (born 1908), South African military commander
- Ben Viljoen (born 1869), South African military commander
- Bronwyn Law-Viljoen, South African writer, editor, publisher and professor
- Christi Viljoen (born 1987), Namibian cricketer
- Christo Viljoen (born 1937). South African academic, engineer, genealogist
- Colin Viljoen (born 1948), South African born English footballer
- Dirk Viljoen (born 1977), cricketer
- Constand Viljoen (1933–2020), South African military commander and politician
- Gerrit Viljoen (born 1926), South African government minister
- Hardus Viljoen (born 1989), South African cricketer
- Irene van Dyk, née Viljoen (born 1972), South African and New Zealand netballer
- Joggie Viljoen (born 1945), South African rugby footballer
- Joggie Viljoen (born 1976), South African rugby footballer
- Johannes Viljoen (1904–1976), South African athlete
- Johannes Hendrikus Viljoen (1893–1957), South African politician
- Jurie Viljoen (born 1942), Namibian politician
- Ken Viljoen (1910–1974), South African cricket player and manager
- Lettie Viljoen, pseudonym of South African author Ingrid Winterbach
- Marais Viljoen (1915–2007), ceremonial State President of South Africa
- Natascha Viljoen (born 1970), South African business executive
- Nik Viljoen, New Zealand football player
- Sunette Viljoen (born 1983), South African javelin thrower
- Willem Viljoen (born 1987), South African badminton player, brother of Annari
