= Nik Viljoen =

New Zealand footballer

Personal information
- Full name: Nicolas Viljoen
- Date of birth: 3 December 1976 (age 49)
- Place of birth: New Zealand
- Position: Striker

Youth career
- Pakuranga Town

Senior career*
Years	Team	Apps	(Gls)
1995–1996	Rotherham United	8	(2)
1996	North Shore United		
1996–2001	Waitakere City		
2002–2003	Fencibles United		
2003	East Auckland		

International career
1996–1997	New Zealand	10	(2)
- * Club domestic league appearances and goals

Nicolas "Nik" Viljoen (born 3 December 1976) is a New Zealand footballer who represented New Zealand at the international level.

Viljoen scored the winner after coming on as a substitute in his full All Whites debut, a 1-0 win over Oman on 29 September 1996 and ended his international playing career with 10 A-international caps and 3 goals to his credit, his final cap an appearance in a 0-2 loss to Indonesia on 21 September 1997.
