= Ross Goodacre =

New Zealand footballer

Personal information
- Full name: Ross Goodacre
- Date of birth: 22 December 1978 (age 47)
- Place of birth: New Zealand
- Position: Midfielder

International career
Years	Team	Apps	(Gls)
1997	New Zealand	1	(0)

Managerial career
- Easley Soccer Club (Manager)

Ross Goodacre is a former association football player who represented New Zealand at an international level.

== Playing career ==
Goodacre made a solitary official international appearance for New Zealand as a substitute in a 0–5 loss to Indonesia on 21 September 1997.
