= Andrew Lortie =

Andrew Lortie (or André Lortie) was a leading French theologian, author and emigre leader of Huguenot Protestants in England, born in France and resident of London at his death, heading the French church there.

Lortie was a well-known author of books attacking the Holy See and transubstantiation and was an early, prominent Protestant theologian.

Most Huguenot churches in the UK and US have since merged with Anglican-based or Reform-based Protestant churches.

== Biographical ==
Lortie was born in France and died in England. Lortie had a son also named Andrew as well as a daughter, Mrs. Brodbelt.
