= Jason New =

New Zealand footballer

Personal information
- Full name: Jason New
- Place of birth: New Zealand

International career
Years	Team	Apps	(Gls)
1988–1989	New Zealand	6	(0)

Jason New is a former association football player who represented New Zealand at international level.

New made his full All Whites debut in a 0–2 loss to China on 28 June 1996 and ended his international playing career with six A-international caps to his credit, his final cap an appearance in a 1–1 draw with Lebanon on 9 October 1996.
