= 2024 Mainland Football Leagues =

Football championship leagues

Mainland Football Leagues
- Season: 2024
- Dates: 29 March - 6 October
- Champions Men's Leagues Southern League (1) Canterbury Men's Premiership (2) Canterbury Men's Championship (3) Nelson Bays Men's Premiership (4): Team Cashmere Technical (1); Waimakariri United (2); University of Canterbury 2nd XI (3); Rangers (4)
- Women's Leagues South Island League (1) Canterbury Women's Premiership (2) Canterbury Women's Championship (3) Nelson Bays Women's Premiership (4): Cashmere Technical (1); University of Canterbury (2); FC Twenty 11 (3); Richmond Athletic (4)
- Cup Competitions English Cup (1) Reta Fitzpatrick Cup (2) Whero Cup (3): Coastal Spirit (1); Cashmere Technical (2); University of Canterbury 3rd XI (3)
- Shields Hurley Shield (Men) (1) Hawkey Shield (Women) (2) MacFarlane Cup (Men) (3) MacFarlane Cup (Women) (4): Christchurch United (1); Coastal Spirit (2); Coastal Spirit (3); Cashmere Technical (4)
- Number beside teams means what league the won, not how many times they have won it.

The 2024 Mainland Football Leagues was the 25th season of football in the Mainland Football federation. There are four main men's leagues and four main women's leagues. The main men's leagues are Southern League, Canterbury Premiership League, Nelson Bays Premiership League, and Canterbury Championship League, respectively tier 2, 3, 3 and 4 among New Zealand men's league system. The main women's leagues are South Island League, Canterbury Women's Premiership League, Nelson Bays Women's Premiership League, and Canterbury Women's Championship League, respectively tier 2, 3, 3 and 4 among New Zealand women's league system.

Along with the main football leagues, there are two main regional knockout cups and a charity cup. The main knockout cups are English Cup for men's teams and Reta Fitzpatrick Cup for women's teams. The charity cup is the Whero Cup for Canterbury Premiership League's reserve teams, Canterbury Championship League and Senior Men's Divisions 1 & 2 teams.

All four of the Canterbury Premiership and Championship leagues are sponsored by New World, while both the Nelson Bays Men's and Women's Premiership leagues are sponsored by Nelson Pines.

== Men's competitions ==
=== National League ===
The 2024 National League was the 3rd season of the league. Ten teams competed in the league – the six teams from the previous season that qualified and four new team that qualified for league. The four qualified teams are Birkenhead United, Coastal Spirit, Western Springs and Western Suburbs. This is Coastal Spirit, Western Springs and Western Suburbs' first season in the National League and Birkenhead United's second season. They replaced, after failing to qualify, Auckland United and Christchurch United after two seasons, Manurewa and Petone after their fist season.

The Mainland Football teams in the National League are Southern League winners Cashmere Technical and runners-up Coastal Spirit. This is Cashmere Technical's third season competing in the National League Championship, while this is Coastal's first season in the league. Failing to achieve a top two placement, Christchurch United is the only other South Island team that has competed in the National League, this is their first season not qualifying for it having competed in the previous two seasons.

==== National League table ====
Pos	Team	Pld	W	D	L	GF	GA	GD	Pts	Qualification
1	Birkenhead United	9	6	2	1	23	16	+7	20	Qualification to Grand Final
2	Auckland City (C)	9	6	1	2	20	10	+10	19	Qualification to Grand Final and Champions League group stage
3	Western Springs	9	6	0	3	25	16	+9	18	
4	Napier City Rovers	9	5	2	2	21	14	+7	17	
5	Wellington Phoenix Reserves (Note: Wellington Phoenix Reserves can not qualify for the Grand Final.)	9	4	1	4	16	19	−3	13	
6	Wellington Olympic	9	3	2	4	17	15	+2	11	
7	Coastal Spirit	9	3	2	4	18	20	−2	11	
8	Cashmere Technical	9	2	3	4	16	18	−2	9	
9	Eastern Suburbs	9	1	2	6	8	17	−9	5	
10	Western Suburbs	9	1	1	7	9	28	−19	4	

Source: New Zealand Football
Rules for classification: 1) Points; 2) Goal difference; 3) Goals for; 4) Goals against; 5) Head to head; 6) Disciplinary record
(C) Champions

=== Southern League ===
The 2024 Southern League was the 3rd season of a full 10 team league, 4th season all total. Ten teams competed in the league – the nine teams from the previous season and the winner of the Southern League play-offs also being the 2023 Canterbury Premiership League champions. The promoted team is University of Canterbury, after winning 5–3 win on aggregate against FC Nelson, then drawing 2–2 on aggregate against Roslyn-Wakari, with University of Canterbury won 6–5 on penalties. This is University of Canterbury's first season in the Southern League, they replaced Green Island after withdrawing at the end of the previous season, they spent three seasons in the league with their highest finish being 8th on all three occasions.

The Southern League sits above the Canterbury Premiership and Nelson Bays Premiership and is also overseen by Mainland Football and Southern Football, despite being run by New Zealand Football as part of the New Zealand National League.

==== Southern League table ====
Pos	Team	Pld	W	D	L	GF	GA	GD	Pts	Qualification
1	Cashmere Technical (C)	18	15	2	1	90	19	+71	47	Winner of Southern League and qualification to National League Championship
2	Coastal Spirit	18	14	3	1	59	17	+42	45	Qualification to National League Championship
3	Christchurch United	18	13	2	3	64	21	+43	41	
4	Nelson Suburbs	17	8	5	4	52	39	+13	29	
5	Ferrymead Bays	18	8	1	9	39	39	0	25	
6	Nomads United	18	7	3	8	27	31	−4	24	
7	Dunedin City Royals	17	6	1	10	27	46	−19	19	
8	Selwyn United	18	4	2	12	31	68	−37	14	
9	University of Canterbury	18	3	2	13	21	46	−25	11	
10	FC Twenty 11 (R)	18	0	1	17	9	93	−84	1	Relegated to Canterbury Premiership

Source: Mainland Football
Rules for classification: 1) Points; 2) Goal difference; 3) Goals scored; 4) Goals against; 5) Head to head; 6) Disciplinary record; 7) Coin toss
(C) Champions; (R) Relegated

==== Southern League play-off series ====
The final of the Southern League play-off series was a two-legged match that take place between the Mainland Football nominated club and Southern Football nominated club. Mainland Football will also have a two-legged play-off match between Nelson Bays Premiership League nominated club and Canterbury Premiership League nominated club. FC Nelson came third in the 2024 Nelson Bays Men's Premiership League, with the champions, Rangers, declining to participate and second-placed Nelson Suburbs Reserves ineligible to participate. Waimakariri United came first in the 2024 Canterbury Men's Premiership League. The winner of this play-off will face the Southern Football nominated club, Wānaka. Wānaka came second in the 2024 Southern Premiership League, with champions Mosgiel, declining to participate for the second year in a row. None of the clubs in the play-off series have previously participated in the Southern League with FC Nelson the only to have reached the Mainland Football Playoff Series play-off stage, losing to University of Canterbury in the 2023 play-off series.

Overview

Team 1	Agg.	Team 2	1st leg	2nd leg
Waimakariri United (C)	6–6 (4–3 p)	FC Nelson (N)	2–3	4–3
Wānaka (S)	9–4	Waimakariri United (C)	5–1	4–3

Matches – Mainland Football Playoff Series

14 September 2024 Leg 1	Waimakariri United	2 – 3	FC Nelson	Kaiapoi
2:45 pm	Cameron 1'; Paterson 16'	Report	Hansen 23' (pen.), 30'; Lian 70' (yellow card) 80'; Harris (yellow card) 82'	Stadium: Kendal Park; Referee: Caleb Downes

21 September 2024 Leg 2	FC Nelson	3 – 4 (a.e.t.) (3–4 p)	Waimakariri United	Nelson
2:00 pm	H. Lian (yellow card) 10'; Harris (yellow card) 14'; P. Lian 38'; Wilson (yellow card) 40'; Hlawnceu 61'; Scott (yellow card) 89'; Cunningham (yellow card) 90+6'; Hansen 119'	Report	Elmohib 2'; Quigley (yellow card) 7'; McCleary (yellow card) 18'; Cameron (yellow card) 80'; Calderbank 90+3' (o.g.); Reid (yellow card) 90+7'; Ribeiro De Abreu 97' (yellow card) 120+1'; Ruwiu 102'	Stadium: Guppy Park; Referee: Aaron Nottage

Matches – Southern League Playoff Series

28 September 2024 Leg 1	Wānaka	5 – 1	Waimakariri United	Wānaka
3:30 pm	Sippola 36' (yellow card) 45'; Brum 39'; Fielding (yellow card) 56'; S. Sprowson 65', 90'; Plimmer 83'	Report	Vialoux 71'; McCleary (yellow card) 36'; Quigley (yellow card) 42'	Stadium: Recreation Centre; Referee: Nikolay Shevlyakov

6 October 2024 Leg 2	Waimakariri United	3 – 4	Wānaka	Kaiapoi
2:45 pm	Kambai 54'; Ribeiro De Abreu 73', 90'	Report	Sippola 63'; Plimmer 70', 83'; A. Sprowson 85'	Stadium: Kendal Park; Referee: Ralph Clink

==== Hurley Shield ====
The Hurley Shield is a Challenge Shield, where only teams from Christchurch challenge for the shield. It is only up for challenge when the current holders plays a league home game, cups competitions are not challenge games. The challenging team need to win against the current holders in order for the shield to change hands; if the match is a draw, the current holders retain the shield.

The Hurley Shield current holders are Christchurch United, who defeated Coastal Spirit 0–1 in round 15 to claim the shield for the first time since July 2012. They have defended the shield twice, once against Selwyn United and once against rivals Cashmere Technical. Christchurch United have locked the shield up for the rest of the season, as there they have no more games left in the season.

Coastal Spirit before they lost the shield, they had defended it six times and were on a club record 22 games unbeaten in all competitions - Chatham Cup, English Cup and Southern League. Coastal's successful defenses were; twice was against Selwyn United (once in 2023 and once in 2024), once against previous holders and local rivals Cashmere Technical, once against local estuary rivals Ferrymead Bays, once against University of Canterbury and once against Nomads United.

===== Hurley Shield Matches =====
Match 1

29 March 2024 Round 1	Coastal Spirit	7–0	Selwyn United	St Albans
2:45 pm	Steinwascher 27', 38', 39', 43'; Bell 29', 45'; Boys 57'	Report	Ede (yellow card) 72'	Stadium: English Park; Referee: Ralph Clink

Match 2

14 April 2024 Round 3	Coastal Spirit	4-4	Cashmere Technical	Linwood
1:00 pm	Hoole 34'; Stearn 40' (yellow card) 71'; Taqizada 45' (yellow card) 38'; Cotter 49'; Bergin (yellow card) 90+2'	Report; Replay	Matthysen 15'; Coughlan 45+6'; Barbour-Ryan 51' (yellow card) 11'; Schwarz 90'	Stadium: Linfield Park; Referee: Caleb Downes

Match 3

28 April 2024 Round 5	Coastal Spirit	1-0	Ferrymead Bays	Linwood
12:00 pm	Meaclem 28'	Report; Replay		Stadium: Linfield Park; Referee: Calvin Berg

Match 4

9 June 2024 Round 9	Coastal Spirit	5-1	University of Canterbury	Linwood
1:00 pm	Steinwascher 8', 40'; Bell 30'; Mitchell 36'; Rabuka 70'	Report; Replay	De Raat (yellow card) 15'; Pledger (yellow card) 26'; Killick 32'	Stadium: Linfield Park; Referee: Hayden McCabe

Match 5

21 July 2024 Round 13	Coastal Spirit	2-0	Nomads United	Linwood
1:00 pm	Steinwascher 32' (pen.); Cotter 57' (yellow card) 77'	Report; Replay	Bruce (yellow card) 90+1'	Stadium: Linfield Park; Referee: Ben O'Connell

Match 6

11 August 2024 Round 15	Coastal Spirit	0-1	Christchurch United	Linwood
1:00 pm	Hoole (yellow card) 34'; Steinwascher (yellow card) 49'; Bergin (yellow card) 54'; Stearn (yellow card) 65'	Report; Replay	van Dijk (yellow card) 41'; Graham (yellow card) 65'; Koplin 80' (yellow card) 88'	Stadium: Linfield Park; Referee: Ben O'Connell

Match 7

17 August 2024 Round 16	Christchurch United	9-0	Selwyn United	Spreydon
2:45 pm	Brazier 11', 32', 90'; David Yoo 32'; Grover 47'; Stevens 57' (pen.), 78', 79'; Meyn 87'	Report	Gaeth (yellow card) 40'; Allatt (yellow card) 53'; Carrodus (yellow card) 80'; Stewart (yellow card) 90+1'	Stadium: United Sports Centre; Referee: Michael Killick

Match 8

1 September 2024 Round 18	Christchurch United	1-1	Cashmere Technical	Spreydon
1:15 pm	Stevens 54'; Bennett (yellow card) 63'; Peterson (yellow card) 79' (yellow-red card) 83'; van Dijk (yellow card) 90'; Duncan (yellow card) 90'	Report	Coughlan 19'; Barbour-Ryan (yellow card) 64'; Schwarz (yellow card) 78'	Stadium: United Sports Centre; Referee: Ben O'Connell

=== Canterbury Men's Premiership League ===
Canterbury Men's Premiership League
- Season: 2024
- Dates: 6 April 2024 - 7 September 2024
- Champions: Waimakariri United
- Matches: 88
- Goals: 333 (3.78 per match)
- Top goalscorer: Conor Clarke (14 goals)
- Biggest home win: Cashmere Technical Reserves 8–0 Parklands United (13 April 2024)
- Biggest away win: Burwood 0–5 Halswell United (6 April 2024); Parklands United 0–5 Western (10 August 2024)
- Highest scoring: Ferrymead Bays U20 Reserves 3–6 Halswell United (25 May 2024)

The 2024 Canterbury Men's Premiership League was the 3rd season of premiership football, since the restructure of the leagues. The League started on 6 April and finished on 31 August, with the competition being a double round robin. Each team can field a maximum of five foreign players as well as one additional foreign player who has Oceania Football Confederation nationality. Temporary Dismissals will be in use for when a player commits a cautionable offence that is relevant to dissent and the length of the dismissal is 10 minutes starting from when play restarts.

At the end of season, the highest ranked team will be nominated to play in a Mainland Football Federation Playoff, two-leg home and away series, against the highest ranked nominated team from Nelson Bays Men's Premiership. This is to get the team that will compete against the highest ranked nominated team from Southern Premiership League in the Southern League Playoff, two-leg home and away series. The winner of Southern League Playoff will be promoted to Southern League, assuming they will have the correct club licensing before the season starts.

Between Round 8 and 10, Christchurch United U20 Reserves results against Nomads United Reserves and Selwyn United U20 Reserves both got over turned to a 3–0 loss from 3–1 and 4–0 wins respectively, after fielding an ineligible player. Cashmere Technical Reserves also fielded an ineligible player in two game, a 2–0 win over Parklands United and a 4–1 win over Burwood overturned to a 3–0 loss. As well as Ferrymead Bays U20 Reserves, they fielded an ineligible player in a 2-1 win over Selwyn United U20 Reserves, which also got overturned to a 3–0 loss.

==== Men's Premiership teams and personnel ====
Ten teams competed in the league – seven teams from the previous season, three teams promoted from the Canterbury Men's Championship League. The promoted teams are in order from 1st to 3rd: Christchurch United U20 Academy, Selwyn United Reserves, Ferrymead Bays Reserves. University of Canterbury were promoted to Southern League, while Cashmere Technical U20 Reserves and Nomads United U20 Reserves are now in Canterbury Men's Championship League being replaced by Cashmere Technical Reserves and Nomads United Reserves.

Team	Location	Home ground	Manager	Captain	2023 season
Burwood AFC	Burwood	Clare Park	Darren Clements	Jamie Auld	6th
Cashmere Technical Reserves	Woolston	Garrick Memorial Park	Adam Keizer	Ewan Hyndman	2nd
Christchurch United U20 Reserves	Spreydon	United Sports Centre	(United States) Paul Holocher	Jackson Blake	1st in Championship (promoted)
Ferrymead Bays U20 Reserves	Ferrymead	Ferrymead Park	(New Zealand) Robert Barraclough	Samuel Daeche	3rd in Championship (promoted)
Halswell United	Halswell	Halswell Domain	(New Zealand) Ollie Hawkins	Isaac Williams	4th
Nomads United Reserves	Casebrook	Tulett Park	(New Zealand) Atticus Jones	Hamish Gillett	3rd
Parklands United	Parklands	Parklands Reserve	Hamish Parker	Dafydd Parry-Griffiths	7th
Selwyn United U20 Reserves	Rolleston	Foster Park	John Morgan	Henry Murfitt (Note: 5 matches, Will Moore 3 matches, Josiah Clark 3 matches, Logan Grosvenor 2 matches, Ezra Green 1 match)	2nd in Championship (promoted)
Waimakariri United	Kaiapoi	Kendal Park	(New Zealand) Harry Trethowan	Bailey McCleary	8th
Western AFC	Mairehau	Walter Park	James Small	Aidan Crystal	5th

===== Men's Premiership Managerial changes =====
Team	Outgoing manager	Manner of departure	Date of vacancy	Position in the table	Incoming manager	Date of appointment
Nomads United Reserves	(New Zealand) Kevin Peters	Mutual consent	11 October 2023	Pre-season	(New Zealand) Atticus Jones	21 December 2023
Waimakariri United	Michael De Bono	Waimakariri United Women's Head Coach	29 November 2023	Pre-season	Brad Eiffe	29 November 2023
Burwood AFC	Mark Hilhorst	Mutual consent	5 December 2023	Pre-season	Darren Clements	7 December 2023
Cashmere Technical Reserves	(England) Adam Searle	Cashmere Technical 17 TDP Head Coach	Before; 11 January 2024	Pre-season	(England) Adam Keizer	After; 11 January 2024
Waimakariri United	Brad Eiffe	Waimakariri United Men's Assistant Head Coach	Between 29 November 2023 - 27 March 2024	Pre-season	(New Zealand) Harry Trethowan	Between 29 November 2023 - 27 March 2024
Parklands United	Gerard Brown	Unknown	Between 25 May 2024 - 8 June 2024	10th	Hamish Parker	Between 25 May 2024 - 8 June 2024
Halswell United	(South Korea) Jae Youn Lee	Mutual consent	Between 6 July 2024 - 13 July 2024	5th	(New Zealand) Ollie Hawkins	Between 6 July 2024 - 13 July 2024

==== Men's Premiership table ====
Pos	Team	Pld	W	D	L	GF	GA	GD	Pts	Qualification
1	Waimakariri United (C)	17	13	2	2	50	21	+29	41	Winners of Canterbury Premiership and qualification to Southern League play-offs
2	Burwood	17	11	3	3	38	18	+20	36	Possible qualification to Southern League play-offs (Note: If highest ranked first team; doesn't nominate themselves to be considered for promotion or decline participation for the playoffs, the second highest ranked first team is nominated)
3	Cashmere Technical Reserves (Note: Unable to be promoted to Southern League due to already having a side in the Southern League; therefore are ineligible to be considered for the 'Playoff Series'.)	18	9	6	3	38	22	+16	33	
4	Halswell United	18	7	7	4	41	29	+12	28	
5	Nomads United Reserves	18	8	1	9	33	33	0	25	
6	Western	18	6	3	9	33	40	−7	21	
7	Selwyn United U20 Reserves	18	6	3	9	31	40	−9	21	
8	Christchurch United U20 Reserves	18	5	4	9	27	33	−6	19	
9	Ferrymead Bays U20 Reserves	18	5	4	9	32	41	−9	19	
10	Parklands United (R)	18	1	3	14	13	59	−46	6	Relegation to Canterbury Men's Championship League

Updated to match(es) played on completed. Source: Mainland Football
Rules for classification: 1) Points; 2) Goal difference; 3) Goals scored; 4) Goals against; 5) Head to head; 6) Disciplinary record; 7) Coin toss
(C) Champions; (R) Relegated
- Christchurch United U20 Reserves won 4–0 in Round 8, but fielded an ineligible player. Result overturned to a 3–0 win for Selwyn United U20 Reserves.
- Christchurch United U20 Reserves won 3–1 in Round 10, but fielded an ineligible player. Result overturned to a 3–0 win for Nomads United Reserves.
- Cashmere Technical Reserves won 2–0 in Round 11, but fielded an ineligible player. Result overturned to a 3–0 win for Parklands United.
- Cashmere Technical Reserves won 4–1 in Round 12, but fielded an ineligible player. Result overturned to a 3–0 win for Burwood.
- Ferrymead Bays U20 Reserves won 2–1 in Round 16, but fielded an ineligible player. Result overturned to a 3–0 win for Selwyn United U20 Reserves.
- The match between Burwood and Waimakariri United was originally meant to be played in Round 9, but due to a player getting a serious injury in the 80th minute of the match, the match got confirmed to be replayed. The replay was moved to after Round 18. With the result of Round 18, the match was canceled with neither team being able to change league positions regardless of result.

==== Men's Premiership results table ====
Home \ Away	BUR	CTR	CUR	FBR	HWU	NUR	PLU	SUR	WAI	WES
Burwood		1–1	4–1	3–1	0–5	1–0	7–0	4–0	Can.	4–1
Cashmere Technical Reserves	0–3 (Note: Cashmere Technical Reserves won 4–1 in Round 12, but fielded an ineligible player. Result overturned to a 3–0 win for Burwood.)		0–0	2–0	3–1	0–0	8–0	4–2	1–0	4–3
Christchurch United U20 Reserves	0–1	0–1		2–2	1–5	0–3 (Note: Christchurch United U20 Reserves won 3–1 in Round 10, but fielded an ineligible player. Result overturned to a 3–0 win for Nomads United Reserves.)	4–0	0–3 (Note: Christchurch United U20 Reserves won 4–0 in Round 8, but fielded an ineligible player. Result overturned to a 3–0 win for Selwyn United U20 Reserves.)	1–2	4–0
Ferrymead Bays U20 Reserves	1–1	0–3	1–0		3–6	3–2	3–0	0–3 (Note: Ferrymead Bays U20 Reserves won 2–1 in Round 16, but fielded an ineligible player. Result overturned to a 3–0 win for Selwyn United U20 Reserves.)	2–4	0–1
Halswell United	0–1	2–2	0–3	1–1		2–1	1–1	3–0	1–3	1–1
Nomads United Reserves	3–1	2–3	2–3	4–3	1–3		2–0	0–2	1–3	3–2
Parklands United	0–1	3–0 (Note: Cashmere Technical Reserves won 2–0 in Round 11, but fielded an ineligible player. Result overturned to a 3–0 win for Parklands United.)	1–1	1–4	2–2	1–3		0–2	1–4	0–5
Selwyn United U20 Reserves	0–0	3–2	3–5	3–3	1–3	1–4	4–2		2–3	1–1
Waimakariri United	4–2	1–1	4–2	4–3	1–1	4–0	4–0	3–1		5–0
Western	1–4	1–3	2–0	1–2	3–3	1–2	4–1	3–0 (Note: Selwyn United U20 Reserves defaulted the match, Resulting in Western winning 3–0.)	2–1	

Updated to match(es) played on completed. Source: Mainland Football
Legend: Blue = home team win; Yellow = draw; Red = away team win.

==== Men's Premiership scoring ====
As of 31 August 2024

===== Men's Premiership top scorers =====
Rank	Player	Club	Goals
1	Conor Clarke	Halswell United	14
2	Elijah Austen	Burwood	10
3	Blake Bamford	Cashmere Technical Reserves	8
3	Danny Loney	Waimakariri United	8
3	Jesse Ruwhiu	Western	8
6	Thomas Costello	Western	7
6	Samuel Deache	Ferrymead Bays U20 Reserves	7
6	Joe Davies	Burwood	7
6	Jacob O'Connell	Halswell United	7
6	Daniel Ribeiro de Abreu	Waimakariri United	7

===== Men's Premiership hat-tricks =====
Round	Player	For	Against	Home/Away	Result	Date
1	Patrick Cameron	Halswell United	Burwood	Away	0–5	6 April 2024
1	Danny Loney	Waimakariri United	Ferrymead Bays U20 Reserves	Away	2–4	6 April 2024
6	Conor Clarke	Halswell United	Ferrymead Bays U20 Reserves	Away	3–6	25 May 2024
14	Blake Bamford	Cashmere Technical Reserves	Selwyn United U20 Reserves	Home	4–2	3 August 2024
15	Daniel Steffert	Western	Parklands United	Away	0–5	10 August 2024
16	Conor Clarke	Halswell United	Christchurch United U20 Reserves	Away	1–5	17 August 2024

===== Men's Premiership own goals =====
Round	Player	Club	H/A	Time	Goal	Result	Opponent	Date
2	Frewen Watts	Christchurch United U20 Reserves	Away	85'	1–0	1–0	Ferrymead Bays U20 Reserves	13 April 2024
5	Jamie Williams	Ferrymead Bays U20 Reserves	Away	53'	2–0	3–1	Burwood	18 May 2024
7	James Anthony Bailey	Parklands United	Home	70'	1–2	1–4	Waimakariri United	8 June 2024
8	Calum Ross	Western	Home	39'	2–3	3–3	Halswell United	15 June 2024
10	Dafydd Parry-Griffiths	Parklands United	Away	23'	2–1	4–2	Selwyn United U20 Reserves	6 July 2024
11	Callum Moores	Ferrymead Bays U20 Reserves	Away	32'	2–1	2–2	Christchurch United U20 Reserves	13 July 2024
11	Aidan Chrystal	Western	Home	78'	0–2	1–2	Nomads United U20 Reserves	13 July 2024
15	Harley Gray	Selwyn United U20 Reserves	Home	60'	0–3	1–4	Nomads United Reserves	10 August 2024
16	Toby Jenkins	Cashmere Technical Reserves	Away	78'	2–2	2–3	Nomads United Reserves	17 August 2024

=== Canterbury Men's Championship League ===
Canterbury Men's Championship League
- Season: 2024
- Dates: 6 April 2024 - 17 August 2024
- Champions: University of Canterbury 2nd XI
- Matches: 72
- Goals: 345 (4.79 per match)
- Top goalscorer: Omar Cameron (12 goals); Only showing goals entered into Match Centre, multiple game goal scorer not entered.
- Biggest home win: Cashmere Technical U20 Reserves 11–0 FC Twenty 11 U20 Reserves (13 July 2024)
- Biggest away win: University of Canterbury 3rd 0–12 Ferrymead Bays Keen Lads (27 April 2024)
- Highest scoring: University of Canterbury 3rd 0–12 Ferrymead Bays Keen Lads (27 April 2024)

The 2024 Canterbury Men's Champions League was the 8th season of championship football, 2nd since the restructure of the leagues. The League started on 6 April and finished on 17 August, with league format being a double round robin. Each team has two byes, one in each round.

Temporary Dismissals will be in use, when an official referee has been appointed, for when a player commits a cautionable offence that is relevant to dissent and the length of the dismissal is 10 minutes starting from when play restarts. For when an official referee hasn't been appointed, they will be known as Sin Bins. A sin bin is the same as a temporary dismissals, but another player is allowed to be subbed on to bring the team back to 11 players. After 10 minutes, the player is allowed to be used again.

The competition allows for each team to have a match day squad of 18 players, 11 starting and 7 substitutes. It also allows for each team to make unlimited substitutions from the 7 substitutes.

On 2 May, Nomads United U20 Reserves were withdrawn from the competition after failing to field a team three times in a row, one being a game postponement against University of Canterbury 3rd and the other two being defaults against Selwyn United Turkeys and Coastal Spirit U20 Reserves. All wins and game results against Nomads United U20 Reserves have been voided, even Nomads only game against Cashmere Technical U20 Reserves, 0–8 win for Cashmere Technical.

==== Men's Championship teams and personnel ====
Ten teams competed in the league – seven teams from the previous season, one team promoted from the Canterbury Men's Division 1 and two teams added/relegated from Canterbury Men's Premiership League. The promoted team is Selwyn United Turkeys, last season known as Selwyn United Roosters. The two teams added/relegated are Cashmere Technical U20 Reserves and Nomads United U20 Reserves. Christchurch United U20 Academy, Selwyn United Reserves, Ferrymead Bays Reserves were all promoted to Canterbury Men's Premiership League, while there were no teams relegated.

Team	Location	Home ground	Manager	Captain	2023 season
Cashmere Technical U20 Reserves	Woolston	Garrick Memorial Park	Liam Collins	Multiple Captains	2nd in Premiership (Added/Relegated)
Coastal Spirit U20 Reserves	Bromley	Linfield Park	John Reynolds	Hamish Mackay	6th
FC Twenty 11 U20 Reserves	Avonhead	Avonhead Park	Joshua Dray	Saul Clark	7th
Ferrymead Bays Keen Lads	Ferrymead	Ferrymead Park	Antony Lawson	Jack Chapman	5th
Halswell United Reserves	Halswell	Halswell Domain	Patrick Rouss	Joseph Barrett	10th
~~Nomads United U20 Reserves~~	~~Casebrook~~	~~Tulett Park~~	—N/a	~~Fraser Lloyd~~	~~3rd in Premiership~~; ~~(Added/Relegated)~~
Selwyn United Turkeys	Rolleston	Foster Park	Michael Hadfield; Lee Hinton	Sam Bourke	1st in Division 1 (Promoted)
University of Canterbury 2nd XI	Ilam	Ilam Field	Ben Ellis	Stuart Campbell	4th
University of Canterbury 3rd XI	Ilam	Ilam Field	Patrick Morris	Liam Slutter	8th
Waimakariri United Reserves	Kaiapoi	Kendal Park	Mark Reid	Multiple Captains	9th

===== Men's Championship Managerial changes =====
Team	Outgoing manager	Manner of departure	Date of vacancy	Position in the table	Incoming manager	Date of appointment
Coastal Spirit U20 Reserves	(Uruguay) Aldo Miramontes	Signed by University of Canterbury AFC	11 October 2023	Pre-season	Steve Ager; Alfie Bonot	Unknown
FC Twenty 11 U20 Reserves	(New Zealand) Graham McMann	First Team Head Coach	16 October 2023	Pre-season	Joshua Dray	Unknown
Waimakariri United Reserves	(New Zealand) Atticus Jones	Signed by Nomads United	12 December 2023	Pre-season	Mark Reid	Unknown
Cashmere Technical U20 Reserves	—N/a	—N/a	—N/a	Pre-season	Liam Collins	Unknown
Nomads United U20 Reserves	—N/a	—N/a	—N/a	Pre-season	—N/a	Unknown
University of Canterbury 2nd XI	(New Zealand) Sam McDonnell	First Team Assistant Coach	Unknown	Pre-season	Ben Ellis	Unknown
Nomads United U20 Reserves	—N/a	—N/a	2 May 2024	9/10th	Withdrawn from league	2 May 2024
Coastal Spirit U20 Reserves	Steve Ager; Alfie Bonot	Mutual consent	18 May 2024	9th	John Reynolds	19 May 2024

==== Men's Championship table ====
Pos	Team	Pld	W	D	L	GF	GA	GD	Pts	Promotion or relegation
1	University of Canterbury 2nd XI	16	14	0	2	57	13	+44	42	Winners of Canterbury Championship and promotion to Canterbury Men's Premiership League
2	Selwyn United Turkeys	16	13	2	1	52	17	+35	41	Possible promotion to Canterbury Men's Premiership League (Note: If highest ranked team doesn't meet the requirements to enter into the Canterbury Premiership, then at the discretion of the Mainland Football Competitions Manager, the second highest ranked team will be offered promotion or no team is promoted at all)
3	Ferrymead Bays Keen Lads	16	12	2	2	79	17	+62	38	
4	University of Canterbury 3rd XI	16	8	3	5	34	34	0	27	
5	Cashmere Technical U20 Reserves	16	7	2	7	38	27	+11	23	
6	Halswell United Reserves	16	5	2	9	30	38	−8	17	
7	Waimakariri United Reserves	16	3	1	12	21	65	−44	10	
8	FC Twenty 11 U20 Reserves	16	3	0	13	19	70	−51	9	
9	Coastal Spirit U20 Reserves	16	1	0	15	15	64	−49	3	Possible relegation to Canterbury Men's Division 1
10	Nomads United U20 Reserves	0	0	0	0	0	0	0	0	Withdrawn from the League

Source: Mainland Football
Rules for classification: 1) Points; 2) Goal difference; 3) Goals scored; All teams declared winners

==== Men's Championship results table ====
Home \ Away	CTR	CSR	FCR	FKL	HUR	SUT	UC2	UC3	WUR
Cashmere Technical U20 Reserves		4–2	11–0	1–8	2–1	1–2	0–2	1–2	3–1
Coastal Spirit U20 Reserves	0–3		1–2	1–5	2–6	0–4	0–6	0–5	0–4
FC Twenty 11 U20 Reserves	0–2	6–2		0–6	1–6	1–2	0–6	0–6	4–2
Ferrymead Bays Keen Lads	2–1	3–1	6–1		6–0	1–3	1–0	1–1	10–1
Halswell United Reserves	3–2	5–1	3–1	1–7		0–2	0–2	2–1	1–1
Selwyn United Turkeys	1–1	3–0	8–2	2–2	3–2		4–2	5–0	4–0
University of Canterbury 2nd XI	1–0	4–0	4–0	4–3	2–0	4–1		6–2	2–0
University of Canterbury 3rd XI	1–1	3–0	2–1	0–12	0–0	0–3	1–2		6–1
Waimakariri United Reserves	1–5	1–5	3–0	0–6	3–2	1–5	1–10	1–2	

Source: Mainland Football
Legend: Blue = home team win; Yellow = draw; Red = away team win.

==== Men's Championship scoring ====
As of 17 August 2024

===== Men's Championship hat-tricks =====
Round	Player	For	Against	Home/Away	Result	Date
~~1~~	~~Jamie Jeffrey-Dally~~	~~Cashmere Technical U20 Reserves~~	~~Nomads United U20 Reserves~~	~~Away~~	~~0–8~~	~~6 April 2024~~
2	Liam Paterson	Waimakariri United Reserves	Coastal Spirit U20 Reserves	Away	0–4	13 April 2024
4	Omar Cameron	Ferrymead Bays Keen Lads	University of Canterbury 3rd	Away	0–12	28 April 2024
4	Ashton Frater	University of Canterbury 2nd	Waimakariri United Reserves	Away	1–10	28 April 2024
5	Abdifatah Sheikh	Halswell United Reserves	Coastal Spirit U20 Reserves	Home	5–1	4 May 2024
9	Josh McArdle	University of Canterbury 3rd	Waimakariri United Reserves	Home	6–1	8 June 2024
10	Joshua Busson	Selwyn United Turkeys	Waimakariri United Reserves	Home	4–0	15 June 2024
10	Matthew Aspinall	Ferrymead Bays Keen Lads	Halswell United Reserves	Home	6–0	15 June 2024
13	Christian Askey	Cashmere Technical U20 Reserves	FC Twenty 11 U20 Reserves	Home	11–0	13 July 2024
13	Liam Collins	Cashmere Technical U20 Reserves	FC Twenty 11 U20 Reserves	Home	11–0	13 July 2024
13	Bailey Hodge	Halswell United Reserves	Coastal Spirit U20 Reserves	Away	2–6	20 July 2024

===== Men's Championship own goals =====
Round	Player	Club	H/A	Time	Goal	Result	Opponent	Date
1	Hamish Mackay	Coastal Spirit U20 Reserves	Home	8'	0–1	1–2	FC Twenty 11 U20 Reserves	6 April 2024
4	Danny Bodger	Selwyn United Turkeys	Home	14'	0–1	3–2	Halswell United Reserves	28 April 2024
9	James Oakes	Waimakariri United Reserves	Away	45'	4–0	6–1	University of Canterbury 3rd	8 June 2024
12	Tahu Russell	Waimakariri United Reserves	Away	47'	3–1	4–2	FC Twenty 11 U20 Reserves	6 July 2024

=== Nelson Bays Men's Premiership League ===
Nelson Bays Men's Premiership League
- Season: 2024
- Dates: 13 April 2024 - 24 August 2024
- Champions: Rangers
- Matches: 56
- Goals: 261 (4.66 per match)
- Biggest home win: Nelson Suburbs Reserves 10–0 Motueka (20 April 2024); FC Nelson Karenni 11–1 Motueka (4 May 2024)
- Biggest away win: Motueka 1–11 Rangers (11 May 2024)
- Highest scoring: Rangers 11–2 Motueka (6 July 2024)

The League started on 13 April and finished on 24 August, with the competition being a double round robin.

At the end of season, the highest ranked team will be nominated to play in a Mainland Football Federation Playoff, two-leg home and away series, against the highest ranked nominated team from Canterbury Men's Premiership. This is to get the team that will compete against the highest ranked nominated team from Southern Premiership League in the Southern League Playoff, two-leg home and away series. The winner of Southern League Playoff will be promoted to Southern League, assuming they will have the correct club licensing before the season starts.

==== Nelson Men's Premiership teams and personnel ====
Eight teams competed in the league – six teams from the previous season and two from Division 2. The promoted teams are in order from 1st to 2nd: FC Nelson Karenni and Golden Bay. The two team that FC Nelson Karenni and Golden Bay replaced are FC Nelson Locomotive and Nelson Suburbs Seals.

Team	Location	Home ground	2023 season
FC Nelson	The Wood	Guppy Park	1st
FC Nelson Karenni	Nelson South	Victory Square	1st in Division 2 (promoted)
Golden Bay	Takaka	Takaka Rec Ground	2nd in Division 2 (promoted)
Motueka	Motueka	Memorial Park	4th
Nelson Suburbs Reserves	Stoke	Saxton Fields	3th
Rangers	Redwoodtown	A & P Park	2nd
Richmond Athletic	Richmond	Jubilee Park	6th
Tahuna	Tāhunanui	Tāhunanui	5th

==== Nelson Men's Premiership table ====
Pos	Team	Pld	W	D	L	GF	GA	GD	Pts	Qualification
1	Rangers (C)	14	10	4	0	59	16	+43	34	Winners of Nelson Men's Premiership
2	Nelson Suburbs Reserves	14	8	4	2	53	21	+32	28	
3	FC Nelson	14	8	4	2	34	21	+13	28	Qualification to Southern League play-offs
4	FC Nelson Karenni	14	7	2	5	40	27	+13	23	
5	Golden Bay	14	6	1	7	24	34	−10	19	
6	Richmond Athletic	14	3	3	8	17	28	−11	12	
7	Tahuna	14	3	3	8	20	31	−11	12	
8	Motueka	14	0	1	13	14	83	−69	1	Relegation to Nelson Bays Men's Division 2

Source: Nelson Bays Football
Rules for classification: 1) Points; 2) Goal difference; 3) Goals scored; All teams declared winners
(C) Champions

==== Nelson Men's Premiership results table ====
Home \ Away	FCN	FNK	GOL	MOT	NSR	RAN	RFC	TAH
FC Nelson		2–0	2–1	4–2	2–2	3–7	2–1	3–0
FC Nelson Karenni	2–2		1–4	11–1	3–1	0–1	2–1	1–0
Golden Bay	1–1	1–3		4–1	0–8	0–5	3–0	2–0
Motueka	1–5	1–8	1–4		0–7	1–11	0–2	0–2
Nelson Suburbs Reserves	1–0	7–2	3–1	10–0		0–0	2–2	5–2
Rangers	3–3	4–0	5–0	11–2	2–2		2–1	2–0
Richmond Athletic	0–2	1–6	2–1	1–1	3–0	0–2		2–4
Tahuna	0–3	1–1	2–3	4–3	2–3	2–2	1–1	

Source: Nelson Bays Football
Legend: Blue = home team win; Yellow = draw; Red = away team win.

== Women's qualifying competitions ==
=== South Island Qualifying League ===
The 2024 South Island Qualifying League was to determine the top three teams in Mainland's federation, with the fourth-placed team playing in a playoff against the third-placed team in Southern Qualifying, who go on to play the top two teams from Southern Football. The bottom teams will play in the Canterbury Women's Premiership, starting after this league finishes. They will be joined by the top teams from the Canterbury Women's Premiership Qualifying League.

Seven team competed in the leagues - five teams from the previous season, one new combined team and one reverted combined team. The new combined team is Nomads-Waimakariri United, NW United for short. They are competing in the league, replacing FC Nomads United. Nomads-Waimakariri United are a combined team of Nomads United and Waimakariri United, replacing the combined Nomads United/FC Twenty 11 team from the previous season. Halswell United are competing as a single club, rather than as the previously combined team of Halswell United and Christchurch United.

==== South Island Qualifying League table ====
Pos	Team	Pld	W	D	L	GF	GA	GD	Pts	Qualification
1	Cashmere Technical (C)	6	6	0	0	44	1	+43	18	Champions and qualification to South Island League
2	Coastal Spirit SAS	6	3	2	1	13	6	+7	11	Qualification to South Island League
3	Nelson Suburbs	6	3	1	2	17	14	+3	10	Qualification to South Island League
4	University of Canterbury	6	3	1	2	16	14	+2	10	Qualification to South Island League Playoff
5	Nomads-Waimakariri United	6	2	0	4	5	15	−10	6	Qualification to Canterbury Women's Premiership
6	Halswell United	6	2	0	4	7	21	−14	6	Qualification to Canterbury Women's Premiership
7	Selwyn United	6	0	0	6	0	31	−31	0	Qualification to Canterbury Women's Premiership

Source: Mainland Football
Rules for classification: 1) Points; 2) Head to head; 3) Disciplinary record (1 Disciplinary Point for Yellow, 3 Disciplinary Points for Red); 4) Coin toss
(C) Champions

==== South Island League play-offs ====
8 June 2024	Roslyn Wakari	1–0	University of Canterbury	Aorangi Park, Timaru
13:30	Body 90+5'

=== Canterbury Women's Premiership Qualifying League ===
Canterbury Women's Premiership Qualifying League
- Season: 2024
- Dates: 6 April 2024 - 15 June 2024
- Champions: University of Canterbury Maroon
- Matches: 38
- Goals: 199 (5.24 per match)

Each team plays each other once, then the league splits into two groups (top four and bottom four) with each team playing another 3 game, with each team playing 10 games. The top 2/3 teams qualifies for the Canterbury Women's Premiership, which played against the bottom 3/4 teams of the South Island Qualifying League.

==== Women's Premiership Qualifying teams ====
Eight teams are competing in the league.

Team	Location	Home ground
Cashmere Technical Reserves	Woolston	Garrick Memorial Park
Coastal Spirit SASFC	St Albans	St Albans Park
Ferrymead Bays	Ferrymead	Ferrymead Park
Halswell United Reserves	Halswell	Halswell Domain
Halswell United Green	Wigram	Te Kahu Park
Nomads-Waimakariri United	Casebrook	Tulett Park
University of Canterbury Gold	Ilam	Ilam Field
University of Canterbury Maroon	Ilam	Ilam Field

==== Women's Premiership Qualifying table ====
Pos	Team	Pld	W	D	L	GF	GA	GD	Pts	Qualification
1	University of Canterbury Maroon	10	8	0	2	37	10	+27	24	Winners of Women's Premiership Qualifying League and Qualification to the Premiership
2	Ferrymead Bays	10	7	1	2	29	13	+16	22	Qualification to the Premiership
3	Cashmere Technical Reserves	10	7	1	2	28	13	+15	22	Qualification to the Premiership
4	Coastal Spiriti SASFC	10	4	1	5	27	26	+1	13	Qualification to the Premiership
5	Halswell United Green	10	4	2	4	25	16	+9	14	Qualification to the Championship
6	University of Canterbury Gold	10	3	1	6	20	19	+1	10	Qualification to the Championship
7	Halswell United Reserves	10	2	2	6	17	48	−31	8	Qualification to Division One
8	Nomads-Waimakariri United	10	1	0	9	16	54	−38	3	Qualification to the Championship

Source: Mainland Football
Rules for classification: 1) Points; 2) Head to head; 3) Disciplinary record; 4) Coin toss

==== Women's Premiership Qualifying results table ====
===== Matches 1-7 =====
Team play each other once, either home or away.

Home \ Away	CTR	CSS	FMB	HWG	HWR	NWU	UCG	UCM
Cashmere Technical Reserves			1–3		3–0 (Note: Halswell United Reserves Defaulted, 3–0 win to Cashmere Technical Reserves)	9–0		0–3
Coastal Spiriti SASFC	0–1			3–2		7–1	3–2	
Ferrymead Bays		3–4		2–0	7–0			
Halswell United Green	1–3						3–0 (Note: University of Canterbury Gold Defaulted, 3–0 win to Halswell United Green)	1–3
Halswell United Reserves		4–4		3–3		5–4	0–5	
Nomads Waimakariri United			2–3	1–6				0–8
University of Canterbury Gold	1–3		0–4			4–0		0–1
University of Canterbury Maroon		3–2	3–2		11–0			

Source: Mainland Football
Legend: Blue = home team win; Yellow = draw; Red = away team win.

===== Matches 8-10 =====
After seven matches, the league splits into two sections (the top four and the bottom four), with the teams playing every other team in their section once (either at home and once away). The exact matches are determined by the position of the teams in the league table at the time of the split.

Top Four

Home \ Away	CTR	CSS	FMB	UCM
Cashmere Technical Reserves		3–2		4–1
Coastal Spiriti SASFC			2–3	0–4
Ferrymead Bays	1–1			
University of Canterbury Maroon			0–1	

Source: Mainland Football
Legend: Blue = home team win; Yellow = draw; Red = away team win.

Bottom Four

Home \ Away	HWG	HWR	NWU	UCG
Halswell United Green				0–0
Halswell United Reserves	0–3			1–6
Nomads Waimakariri United	1–6	2–4		
University of Canterbury Gold			2–4	

Source: Mainland Football
Legend: Blue = home team win; Yellow = draw; Red = away team win.

=== Canterbury Women's Championship Qualifying League ===
Canterbury Women's Championship Qualifying League
- Season: 2024
- Dates: 6 April 2024 - 18 May 2024
- Champions: Hornby United
- Matches: 30
- Goals: 140 (4.67 per match)

Each team plays each other once; then the league splits into two groups (top four and bottom three) with each team playing another 2/3 games, with each team playing 8/9 games.

==== Women's Championship Qualifying teams ====
Seven teams are competing in the league.

Team	Location	Home ground
Coastal Spirit Blue	Bromley	Linfield Park
FC Twenty 11	Avonhead	Avonhead Park
Ferrymead Bays White	Ferrymead	Ferrymead Park
Hornby United	Hornby	Warren Park
Papanui-Redwood	Redwood	Redwood Park
Selwyn United	Rolleston	Foster Park
University of Canterbury Unicorns	Ilam	Ilam Field

==== Women's Championship Qualifying table ====
Pos	Team	Pld	W	D	L	GF	GA	GD	Pts	Qualification
1	Hornby United	9	7	1	1	27	14	+13	22	Champions of Women's Championship Qualifying League and Qualification to the Championship
2	FC Twenty 11	9	7	0	2	48	14	+34	21	Qualification to the Championship
3	Coastal Spirit Blue	9	5	2	2	33	21	+12	17	Qualification to the Championship
4	Papanui-Redwood	9	2	1	6	11	32	−21	7	Qualification to Division One
5	Selwyn United	8	2	1	5	10	13	−3	7	Qualification to Division One
6	Ferrymead Bays White	8	1	3	4	6	18	−12	6	Qualification to Division One
7	University of Canterbury Unicorns	8	2	0	6	5	28	−23	6	Qualification to Division One

Source: Mainland Football
Rules for classification: 1) Points; 2) Head to head; 3) Disciplinary record; 4) Coin toss

==== Women's Championship Qualifying results table ====
Home \ Away	CSB	FCT	FMW	HOR	PRD	SEL	UCU
Coastal Spirit Blue			2–2			5–1	7–0
FC Twenty 11	8–1			5–0	7–2		
Ferrymead Bays White		0–3		0–4	0–0		0–1
Hornby United	2–2				3–1	2–0	
Papanui-Redwood	0–3						3–0
Selwyn United		0–1	6–0		0–2		1–0
University of Canterbury Unicorns		0–10		1–3			

Source: Mainland Football
Legend: Blue = home team win; Yellow = draw; Red = away team win.

===== Matches 8-10 =====
After six matches, the league splits into two sections (the top four and the bottom three), with the teams playing every other team in their section once (either at home and once away). The exact matches are determined by the position of the teams in the league table at the time of the split.

Top Four

Home \ Away	CSB	FCT	HOR	PRD
Coastal Spirit Blue		6–2		
FC Twenty 11				10–1
Hornby United	4–3			
Papanui-Redwood	2–4		0–5	

Source: Mainland Football
Legend: Blue = home team win; Yellow = draw; Red = away team win.

Bottom Four

Home \ Away	FMW	SEL	UCU
Ferrymead Bays White			3–1
Selwyn United	1–1		
University of Canterbury Unicorns		2–1	

Source: Mainland Football
Legend: Blue = home team win; Yellow = draw; Red = away team win.

== Women's competitions ==
=== Women's National League ===
The 2024 Women's National League was the 4th season of the new structure, 21st season in total. Ten teams competed in the league – the nine teams from the previous season that qualified and one new team that qualified for league. The new team that qualified West Coast Rangers. This is West Coast Rangers first season in the National League. They replaced, after failing to qualify, Ellerslie after their fist season.

There are no Mainland Football club teams in the National League, but there is a federation side, Canterbury United Pride. This is the Pride's twenty-first season competing in the National League.

==== Women's National League table ====
Pos	Team	Pld	W	D	L	GF	GA	GD	Pts	Qualification
1	Auckland United (C)	9	8	1	0	21	4	+17	25	Qualification to Grand Final and Women's Champions League group stage
2	CF Waterside Karori	9	5	3	1	18	8	+10	18	Qualification to Grand Final
3	Eastern Suburbs	9	4	2	3	24	9	+15	14	
4	Western Springs	9	4	2	3	22	13	+9	14	
5	West Coast Rangers	9	4	2	3	20	15	+5	14	
6	CF Wellington United	9	3	4	2	19	11	+8	13	
7	Canterbury United Pride	9	4	1	4	17	20	−3	13	
8	Southern United	9	3	2	4	17	12	+5	11	
9	Wellington Phoenix Reserves (Note: Wellington Phoenix Reserves can not qualify for the Grand Final.)	9	1	1	7	9	28	−19	4	
10	Central Football	9	0	0	9	3	50	−47	0	

Source: New Zealand Football
Rules for classification: 1) Points; 2) Goal difference; 3) Goals for; 4) Head to head; 5) Disciplinary record; 6) Coin toss
(C) Champions

=== South Island League ===
The 2024 South Island League was the 2nd season of the league, 3rd season in total. Six teams competed in the league - five teams from the previous edition of the league and one new team. The new team is Roslyn-Wakari who qualified after winning the play-off against the team they replaced, University of Canterbury.

The South Island League sits above the Canterbury Women's Premiership League and Southern Women's Premier League and is also overseen by Mainland Football and Southern Football, despite being run by New Zealand Football as part of the New Zealand Women's National League. The league started on 22 June and finished on 8 September.

==== South Island League table ====
Pos	Team	Pld	W	D	L	GF	GA	GD	Pts	Qualification
1	Cashmere Technical (C)	10	8	1	1	49	6	+43	25	Winner of Women's South Island League
2	Dunedin City Royals	10	8	1	1	25	4	+21	25	
3	Coastal Spirit SAS	10	6	1	3	25	14	+11	19	
4	Otago University	10	3	2	5	12	17	−5	11	
5	Roslyn-Wakari	10	1	2	7	5	41	−36	5	
6	Nelson Suburbs	10	0	1	9	5	39	−34	1	

Source: Mainland Football
Rules for classification: 1) Points; 2) Goal difference; 3) Goals scored; 4) Goals against; 5) Head to head; 6) Disciplinary record; 7) Coin toss
(C) Champions

==== Hawkey Shield ====
The Hawkey Shield is a Challenge Shield, where only teams from Christchurch challenge for the shield. It is only up for challenge when the current holders plays a league home game, cups competitions are not challenge games. The challenging team need to win against the current holders in order for the shield to change hands; if the match is a draw, the current holders retain the shield.

The Hawkey Shield current holders are Coastal Spirit, who have defended it for seven years in a row. They have defended it against Selwyn United, Halswell United and local rivals Cashmere Technical. Coastal have defended the shield for the eighth year in a row, since winning it back in 2017.

===== Hawkey Shield Matches =====
Match 1 (South Island Qualifying League)

27 April 2024	Coastal Spirit	6-0	Selwyn United	St Albans
2:45 pm	Whyte 36', 42'; Hepburn 41'; Newman 43', 45+2', 58'	Report		Stadium: English Park; Referee: Kyle McCutcheon

Match 2 (South Island Qualifying League)

18 May 2024	Coastal Spirit	3-1	Halswell United	St Albans
2:45 pm	Dabner 44'; Cameron 70'; Newman 89'	Report	Newlands 83'; Brodie (yellow card) (red card) Both after match'	Stadium: English Park; Referee: Sean Woodnutt

Match 3 (South Island League)

21 July 2024	Coastal Spirit	2-1	Cashmere Technical	Linwood
11:00 am	van Noorden 12'; Hepburn (yellow card) 37'; Newman 71'	Report	Phillips 2'; Perrott (yellow card) 71'	Stadium: Linfield Park; Referee: Yash Naicker

=== Canterbury Women's Premiership League ===
Canterbury Women's Premiership League
- Season: 2024
- Dates: 22 June 2024 - 24 August 2024
- Champions: University of Canterbury
- Matches: 40
- Goals: 120 (3 per match)

Each team plays each other once; then the league splits into two groups (top four and bottom four) with each team playing another three games, with each team playing 10 games. The top four teams from the Canterbury Women's Premiership Qualifying and the bottom four teams from the South Island Qualifying League are the eight teams.

==== Canterbury Women's Premiership teams ====
Eight teams are competing in the league.

Team	Location	Home ground
Cashmere Technical Reserves	Woolston	Garrick Memorial Park
Coastal Spirit SASFC	St Albans	St Albans Park
Ferrymead Bays Blue	Ferrymead	Ferrymead Park
Halswell United	Halswell	Halswell Domain
Nomads-Waimakariri United	Casebrook	Tulett Park
Nomads-Waimakariri United	Kaiapoi	Kendal Park
Selwyn United	Rolleston	Foster Park
University of Canterbury	St Albans	English Park
University of Canterbury Maroon	St Albans	English Park

==== Canterbury Women's Premiership table ====
Pos	Team	Pld	W	D	L	GF	GA	GD	Pts	Qualification
1	University of Canterbury (C)	10	8	1	1	24	4	+20	25	Winners of Women's Premiership League
2	Nomads Waimakariri United	10	6	1	3	25	17	+8	19	
3	Halswell United	10	4	4	2	17	9	+8	16	
4	University of Canterbury Maroon	10	4	2	4	13	11	+2	14	
5	Selwyn United	10	4	1	5	14	21	−7	13	
6	Ferrymead Bays Blue	10	3	3	4	13	14	−1	12	
7	Cashmere Technical Reserves	10	3	1	6	7	15	−8	10	
8	Coastal Spiriti SASFC	10	1	1	8	7	29	−22	4	

Source: Mainland Football
Rules for classification: 1) Points; 2) Head to head; 3) Disciplinary record; 4) Coin toss
(C) Champions

==== Women's Premiership results table ====
===== Matches 1-7 =====
Team play each other once, either home or away.

Home \ Away	CAS	CSS	FMB	HWU	NWU	SEL	UCF	UCM
Cashmere Technical Reserves		2–0			1–3	1–0		1–0
Coastal Spiriti SASFC			2–4				1–6	0–2
Ferrymead Bays Blue	1–1			1–1		0–0	0–4	
Halswell United	3–0	1–1			3–3			1–1
Nomads Waimakariri United		3–0	2–1			0–5		2–3
Selwyn United		6–0		1–5				1–4
University of Canterbury	2–0			0–1	2–0	4–0		
University of Canterbury Maroon			2–1	1–1			0–1	

Source: Mainland Football
Legend: Blue = home team win; Yellow = draw; Red = away team win.

===== Matches 8-10 =====
After seven matches, the league splits into two sections (the top four and the bottom four), with the teams playing every other team in their section once (either at home or away).

Top Four

Home \ Away	HWU	NWU	UCF	UCM
Halswell United			0–1	1–0
Nomads Waimakariri United	2–1		2–4	
University of Canterbury				0–0
University of Canterbury Maroon		1–3		

Updated to match(es) played on 17 August 2024. Source: Mainland Football
Legend: Blue = home team win; Yellow = draw; Red = away team win.

Bottom Four

Home \ Away	CAS	CSS	FMB	SEL
Cashmere Technical Reserves		0–1		1–2
Coastal Spiriti SASFC				1–3
Ferrymead Bays Blue	3–0	2–1		
Selwyn United			1–0	

Source: Mainland Football
Legend: Blue = home team win; Yellow = draw; Red = away team win.

=== Canterbury Women's Championship League ===
Canterbury Women's Championship League
- Season: 2024
- Dates: 22 June 2024 - 31 August 2024
- Champions: FC Twenty 11
- Matches: 30
- Goals: 138 (4.6 per match)

Each team plays each other twice, home and away; the top three teams from the Canterbury Women's Championship Qualifying and three teams from the Canterbury Women's Premiership Qualifying.

==== Canterbury Women's Championship teams ====
Six teams are competing in the league.

Team	Location	Home ground
Coastal Spirit	Bromley	Linfield Park
FC Twenty 11	Avonhead	Avonhead Park
Halswell United Green	Wigram	Te Kahu Park
Hornby United	Hornby	Warren Park
Nomads Waimakariri United	Kaiapoi	Kendal Park
University of Canterbury Gold	Ilam	Ilam Field

==== Canterbury Women's Championship table ====
Pos	Team	Pld	W	D	L	GF	GA	GD	Pts	Qualification
1	FC Twenty 11 (C)	10	8	0	2	34	16	+18	24	Champions of Women's Championship Qualifying League
2	University of Canterbury Gold	10	6	0	4	26	18	+8	18	
3	Halswell United Green	10	5	1	4	32	17	+15	16	
4	Nomads-Waimakariri United	10	3	2	5	21	28	−7	11	
5	Hornby United	10	3	3	4	14	20	−6	12	
6	Coastal Spirit	10	1	2	7	11	39	−28	5	

Source: Mainland Football
Rules for classification: 1) Points; 2) Head to head; 3) Disciplinary record; 4) Coin toss
(C) Champions

==== Women's Championship results table ====
Home \ Away	CSB	FCT	HAL	HOR	NWU	UCG
Coastal Spirit		2–4	1–10	0–1	2–0	0–5
FC Twenty 11	4–1		0–2	4–1	4–1	4–2
Halswell United Green	8–2	1–3		2–2	2–4	2–1
Hornby United	2–2	1–3	1–0		2–2	1–3
Nomads Waimakariri United	1–1	2–5	3–2	2–3		4–3
University of Canterbury Gold	3–0	3–2	0–3	2–2	4–2	

Source: Mainland Football
Legend: Blue = home team win; Yellow = draw; Red = away team win.

=== Nelson Bays Women's Premiership League ===
Nelson Bays Women's Premiership League
- Season: 2024
- Dates: 13 April 2024 - 17 August 2024
- Champions: Richmond Foxes
- Matches: 56
- Goals: 369 (6.59 per match)
- Biggest home win: Nelson Suburbs Reserves 19–0 FC Nelson Diamonds (4 May 2024)
- Biggest away win: Motueka 0–11 Nelson Suburbs Reserves (27 April 2024)
- Highest scoring: Nelson Suburbs Reserves 19–0 FC Nelson Diamonds (4 May 2024)

==== Nelson Women's Premiership teams and personnel ====
Eight teams are competing in the league.

Team	Location	Home ground
FC Nelson Diamonds	The Wood	Guppy Park
Golden Bay	Takaka	Takaka Rec Ground
Mapua Cougars	Mapua	Mapua Domain
Motueka Angels	Motueka	Memorial Park
Nelson Suburbs Reserves	Stoke	Saxton Fields
Nelson Suburbs Swans	Stoke	Saxton Fields
Richmond Foxes	Richmond	Jubilee Park
Tahuna Breakers	Tāhunanui	Tāhunanui

==== Nelson Women's Premiership table ====
Pos	Team	Pld	W	D	L	GF	GA	GD	Pts	Qualification
1	Richmond Foxes (C)	14	13	1	0	87	9	+78	40	Winners of Nelson Women's Premiership
2	Nelson Suburbs Reserves	14	10	1	3	61	19	+42	31	
3	Nelson Suburbs Swans	14	7	1	6	39	31	+8	22	
4	Golden Bay	14	7	2	5	47	29	+18	23	
5	Tahuna Breakers	14	8	0	6	54	24	+30	24	
6	Mapua Cougars	14	6	1	7	45	52	−7	19	
7	Motueka Angles	14	2	0	12	15	103	−88	6	
8	FC Nelson Diamonds	14	0	0	14	11	92	−81	0	

Source: Nelson Bays Football
Rules for classification: 1) Points; 2) Goal difference; 3) Goals scored; All teams declared winners
(C) Champions

==== Nelson Women's Premiership results table ====
Home \ Away	FND	GOL	MAP	MOT	NSR	NSS	RFC	TAH
FC Nelson Diamonds		0–6	4–9	0–3	0–3	3–4	0–9	1–11
Golden Bay	5–0		1–2	11–0 (Note: Game got entered in as Golden Bay 9–0 win, note saying fair play rule in place)	2–4	3–3	2–2	2–1
Mapua Cougars	8–1	2–4		5–1	1–1	1–3	0–5	1–10
Motueka Angles	2–0	3–8	3–11		0–11	0–9	0–9	0–6
Nelson Suburbs Reserves	19–0	2–0	6–1	3–0		1–0	0–8	5–1
Nelson Suburbs Swans	5–1	0–2	2–3	6–1	3–5		1–7	1–0
Richmond Foxes	5–1	7–0	7–1	10–2	2–1	4–1		5–0
Tahuna Breakers	3–0	3–1	4–0	14–0	1–0	0–1	0–7	

Source: Nelson Bays Football
Legend: Blue = home team win; Yellow = draw; Red = away team win.

== Cup competitions ==
=== English Cup ===
2024 English Cup
Tournament details
- Dates: 25 April 2024 - 7 September 2024
- Teams: 15

Final positions
- Champions: Coastal Spirit (1st title)
- Runners-up: Cashmere Technical

Tournament statistics
- Matches played: 14
- Goals scored: 56 (4 per match)
- Top goal scorer(s): Gabriel Gallaway (5 goals)

Awards
- Steve Summer Medal: Alex Steinwascher

The 2024 English Cup was the 111th edition, the 104th time the trophy has been played for, of the English Cup.

==== English Cup teams ====
Team	2023 season	Team	2023 season
Burwood	R1	Oxford	DNP
Cashmere Technical	2nd	Parklands United	QF
Christchurch United	1st	St Albans Shirley	QF
Coastal Spirit	SF	Selwyn United	QF
FC Twenty 11	R1	University of Canterbury	R1
Ferrymead Bays	R1	Waimakariri United	QF
Halswell United	SF	Western	R1
Nomads United	R1		

==== English Cup Bracket ====
Round 1
25 April
Cashmere Technical	10
St Albans Shirley	0
25 April
Selwyn United	1
Nomads United	3
25 April
Burwood	0
Ferrymead Bays	1
25 April
University of Canterbury	0
Christchurch United	1
25 April
FC Twenty 11	0
Oxford	1
25 April
Halswell United	3 (3)
Western (p)	3 (4)
25 April
Coastal Spirit	3
Waimakariri United	0

Quarter Final
27 July
Cashmere Technical	4
Nomads United	0
11 June
Ferrymead Bays	1
Christchurch United	2
9 July
Oxford	2
Western	5
28 May
Parklands United	0
Coastal Spirit	6

Semi Final
20 August
Cashmere Technical	2
Christchurch United	0
6 August
Western	1
Coastal Spirit	3

Final
7 September
Cashmere Technical	0
Coastal Spirit	4

==== English Cup Round 1 ====
25 April	FC Twenty 11	0 – 1	Oxford	Avonhead
2:00 pm	Simpson (yellow card) 59' (yellow-red card) 90+6'	Report	Loevenich 56'; Balcazar (yellow card) 69'	Stadium: Avonhead Park; Referee: Simon Roydhouse

25 April	Coastal Spirit	3 – 0	Waimakariri United	Linwood
2:00 pm	van der Meer 30' (o.g.); Lanigan (yellow card) 44'; Kranick 56'; Meaclem (yellow card) 62'; Rabuka 78'	Report	Brandso (yellow card) 11'; Woolhouse (yellow card) 28'	Stadium: Linfield Park; Referee: Iain Marshall

25 April	Halswell United	3 – 3 (3–4 p)	Western	Halswell
2:00 pm	Steel 54'; Williams 67'; Clarke 90+4'	Report	Ross 6'; McGirr (yellow card) 37'; Young 36' (o.g.); Noonan (yellow card) 72'; Brandon 88'	Stadium: Halswell Domain; Referee: Michael Killick

25 April	University of Canterbury	0 – 1	Christchurch United	St Albans
2:00 pm	Aitchison (red card) 87'	Report	Meyn 43'	Stadium: English Park; Referee: Caleb Downes

25 April	Cashmere Technical	10 – 0	St Albans Shirley	Woolston
2:00 pm	Ballard 22', 43'; van Dam 38'; Gallaway 41', 64', 69'; Caughey 52', 78'; Tod-Smith 69'; Matthysen 79'	Report	Constanti (yellow card) 68'; Peden (yellow card) 73' (yellow-red card) 80'	Stadium: Garrick Memorial Park; Referee: Thomas Lawson

25 April	Selwyn United	1 – 3	Nomads United	Rolleston
2:00 pm	Jerkovic 76'	Report	McIntyre 3', 25'; Goldsmith 17'; Gable (yellow card) 90+4'	Stadium: Foster Park; Referee: Craig Duff

25 April	Burwood	0 – 1	Ferrymead Bays	Burwood
2:00 pm	Brainithwaite (yellow card) 87'	Report	Auld 40' (o.g.); Deehan (yellow card) 90+5'	Stadium: Clare Park; Referee: Michael Field

==== English Cup Quarter Final ====
28 May	Parklands United	0 – 6	Coastal Spirit	St Albans
7:30 pm	Hall (yellow card) 79'	Report	Steinwascher 3', 5'; Bell 14'; Hoole 33'; Cotter 60'; Mitchell 61' (yellow card) 77'	Stadium: English Park; Referee: Aaron Nottage

11 June	Ferrymead Bays	1 – 2	Christchurch United	St Albans
7:30 pm	Stewart 90+2'	Report	de Groot-Green 28'; Stevens 52'	Stadium: English Park; Referee: Ben O'Connell

9 July	Oxford FC	2 – 5	Western AFC	St Albans
7:30 pm	Dunnink (yellow card) 55' (goal) 74'; Arratia 87'	Report	Bradford 9', 51', 55'; Zimmerman 31', 33'	Stadium: English Park; Referee: Yash Naicker

27 July	Cashmere Technical	4 – 0	Nomads United	St Albans
7:30 pm	Lapslie 9'; Gallaway 25', 69'; McIsaac 66'; Tyndall (yellow card) 52'	Report	Holland (yellow card) 52'; Sandys (red card) 51'	Stadium: English Park; Referee: Caleb Downes

==== English Cup Semi Final ====
6 August	Western	1 – 3	Coastal Spirit	St Albans
7:15 pm	Bradford 41'; Pitts (yellow card) 47'; Boomer (yellow card) 57'; Ross (yellow card) 82'	Report	Rabuka (yellow card) 29'; Stanley 34', 75'; Steinwascher 90+1'	Stadium: English Park; Referee: Craig Duff

20 August	Cashmere Technical	2 – 0	Christchurch United	St Albans
7:00 pm	McIsaac (yellow card) 33'; Coughlan 50', 74'	Report	Meyn (yellow card) 16'; de Groot-Green (yellow card) 59'; Grover (yellow card) 61'; Hornsby (yellow card) 90'	Stadium: English Park; Referee: Caleb Downes

==== English Cup Final ====
7 September
3:00 pm

Cashmere Technical	0 – 4	Coastal Spirit
Lapslie (yellow card) 38'; Tod-Smith (yellow card) 76'; Kane (yellow card) 85'	Report	Steinwascher 9'; MacLennan 19', 54'; Bell 34'; Bergin (yellow card) 38'; Boys (yellow card) 44'; Stanton (Coach) (yellow card) 45'; Meaclem (yellow card) 90+2'

English Park, St Albans
Referee: Craig Duff

This was the fourth of five meetings this year between Cashmere Technical and Coastal Spirit, with the next meeting coming in the National League. Coastal Spirit have won the last two meeting, once in the Chatham Cup winning 3–1 at Linfield Park, and once in the Southern League winning 2–0 at Garrick Memorial Park. The other result this year was a 4–4 draw in the 3rd round of the Southern League. This is the second time that the two sides have meet in the English Cup Final with Cashmere Technical winning 3–2 in extra time in the 2018 final. This is also Cashmere Technical's 8th English Cup Final in a row.

==== English Cup Goalscorers ====
There have been 56 goals scored in 14 matches, for an average of 4 goals per match (as of 7 September 2024).

5 goals

- Cashmere Technical - Gabriel Gallaway

4 goals

- Coastal Spirit - Alex Steinwascher
- Western - Parker Bradford

2 goals

- Cashmere Technical - Alex Ballard
- Cashmere Technical - Finn Caughey
- Cashmere Technical - Garbhan Coughlan
- Coastal Spirit - Weston Bell
- Coastal Spirit - Daniel MacLennan
- Coastal Spirit - Ryan Stanley
- Nomads United - Angus McIntyre
- Western - Scott Zimmerman

1 goal

- Cashmere Technical - Benjamin Lapslie
- Cashmere Technical - Lyle Matthysen
- Cashmere Technical - Lachie McIsaac
- Cashmere Technical - Matt Tod-Smith
- Cashmere Technical - Yusuf van Dam
- Christchurch United - Daniel Meyn
- Christchurch United - Joel Stevens
- Christchurch United - Kaleb de Groot-Green
- Coastal Spirit - Liam Cotter
- Coastal Spirit - Joe Hoole
- Coastal Spirit - Auston Kranick
- Coastal Spirit - Jack Mitchell
- Coastal Spirit - Apisai Rabuka
- Ferrymead Bays - Trey Stewart
- Halswell United - Conor Clarke
- Halswell United - Finn Steel
- Halswell United - Isaac Williams
- Nomads United - Cooper Goldsmith
- Oxford - Nicolas Arratia
- Oxford - Jeroen Dunnink
- Oxford - Nicolas Loevenich
- Selwyn United - Luke Jerkovic
- Western - Connor Brandon
- Western - Calum Ross

1 own goal

- Burwood - Jamie Auld (against Ferrymead Bays)
- Halswell United - Alex Young (against Western)
- Waimakariri United - Jasper van der Meer (against Coastal Spirit)

=== Reta Fitzpatrick Cup ===
2024 Reta Fitzpatrick Cup
Tournament details
- Dates: 25 April 2024 - 11 September 2024
- Teams: 9

Final positions
- Champions: Cashmere Technical (4th title)
- Runners-up: Halswell United

Tournament statistics
- Matches played: 8
- Goals scored: 27 (3.38 per match)
- Top goal scorer(s): Lainey Alitieri-Need; Lisa Evans (3 goals each)

Awards
- MVP Player: Emma Kench

The 2024 Reta Fitzpatrick Cup is the 50th edition, the 46th time the trophy has been played for, of the Reta Fitzpatrick Cup.

==== Reta Fitzpatrick Cup teams ====
Team	2023 season
Cashmere Technical	1st
Coastal Spirit	SF
FC Twenty 11	2nd (Note: FC-Nomads United came 2nd; Waimakariri United got knocked out in Round 1.)
Ferrymead Bays	QF
Halswell United	SF
Nomads-Waimakariri United	2nd
Hornby United	DNP
Selwyn United	QF
University of Canterbury	QF

==== Reta Fitzpatrick Cup Bracket ====
Round 1
25 April
Ferrymead Bays	2
FC Twenty 11	0

Quarter Final
3 July
University of Canterbury	2 (4)
Coastal Spirit	2 (5)
17 July
Cashmere Technical	9
Ferrymead Bays	0
19 June
Nomads-Waimakariri United	0
Halswell United	1
5 June
Hornby United	0
Selwyn United	2

Semi Final
14 August
Coastal Spirit	2
Cashmere Technical	3
7 August
Halswell United	1
Selwyn United	0

Final
11 September
Cashmere Technical	3
Halswell United	0

==== Reta Fitzpatrick Cup Round 1 ====
25 April	Ferrymead Bays	2 – 0	FC Twenty 11	Ferrymead
2:00 pm	Summerlee 32', 63'	Report		Stadium: Ferrymead Park; Referee: Kyle McCutcheon

==== Reta Fitzpatrick Cup Quarter Final ====
5 June	Hornby United	0 – 2	Selwyn United	St Albans
7:30 pm		Report	Shepherd 57'; Wilson 71'; McLean (red card) 78'; Paul (yellow card) 88'	Stadium: English Park; Referee: Chris O'Connell

19 June	Nomads-Waimakariri United	0 – 1	Halswell United	St Albans
7:30 pm	Barrett (yellow card) 76'	Report	Kowalski 9'; Tizzard (yellow card) 55'; Hartel (yellow card) 78'	Stadium: English Park; Referee: Roelof Boiten

3 July	University of Canterbury	2 – 2 (4–5 p)	Coastal Spirit	St Albans
7:30 pm	Kowalski 71', 90+3'	Report	Newman 14'; Jamieson 63' (o.g.)	Stadium: English Park; Referee: Alexander Black

17 July	Cashmere Technical	9 – 0	Ferrymead Bays	St Albans
7:30 pm	Alitieri-Need 3', 53', 66'; Bush 9' (o.g.); McPhie 22'; Wall 32', 40'; Dias 68'; Hales 84'	Report	Warburton (yellow card) 12'	Stadium: English Park; Referee: Mark Currie

==== Reta Fitzpatrick Cup Semi Final ====
7 August	Halswell United	1 – 0	Selwyn United	St Albans
7:00 pm	Brodie 89'	Report		Stadium: English Park; Referee: Roelof Boiten

14 August	Coastal Spirit	2 – 3	Cashmere Technical	St Albans
7:00 pm	Nicholson 68'; Simpson 90'	Report	Evans 8', 51'; Fisher 25'	Stadium: English Park; Referee: Michael Lauer

==== Reta Fitzpatrick Cup Final ====
11 September	Cashmere Technical	3 – 0	Halswell United	St Albans
7:00 pm	Roberts 14'; Dias 16'; Evans 78'	Report		Stadium: English Park; Referee: Simon Roydhouse

==== Reta Fitzpatrick Cup Goalscorers ====
There have been 27 goals scored in 8 matches, for an average of 3.38 goals per match (as of 7 September 2024).

3 goals

- Cashmere Technical - Lainey Alitieri-Need
- Cashmere Technical - Lisa Evans

2 goals

- Cashmere Technical - Margarida Dias
- Cashmere Technical - Lily Fisher
- Cashmere Technical - Lara Wall
- Ferrymead Bays - Sarah Summerlee
- University of Canterbury - Kelsey Barrett

1 goal

- Cashmere Technical - Anna McPhie
- Cashmere Technical - Ruby Hales
- Coastal Spirit - Laura Newman
- Coastal Spirit - Britney-lee Nicholson
- Coastal Spirit - Meg Simpson
- Halswell United - Rachel Brodie
- Halswell United - Sara Kowalski
- Selwyn United - Melanie Shepherd
- Selwyn United - Amelia Wilson

1 own goal

- Ferrymead Bays - Kirsty Bush (against Cashmere Technical)
- University of Canterbury - Danja Jamieson (against Coastal Spirit)

=== Whero Cup ===
2024 Whero Cup
Tournament details
- Dates: 25 April 2024 - 31 August 2024
- Teams: 33

Final positions
- Champions: University of Canterbury 3rd XI
- Runners-up: Selwyn United U20 Reserves

Tournament statistics
- Matches played: 31
- Goals scored: 149 (4.81 per match)
- Goals from defaulted games not included (6 Goals)

The 2024 Whero Cup is a Charity cup competition for all teams in Canterbury Men's Championship League, Senior Men's Division 1 & 2 and Reserve teams in Men's Premiership League. This is the 2nd edition of the Whero Cup.

In 2023, the Whero Cup helped raise awareness and support for Ronald McDonald House South Island. This season, the cup will again help raise awareness and support for Ronald McDonald House South Island.

On 1 May 2024, Mainland Football released the draw for Round 2. One notable difference was that Coastal Spirit U20 Reserves were drawn out from the cup, while the team that bet them, Nomads United U20 Reserves, were not drawn out. The day later, it was reveled that Nomads United U20 Reserves were withdrawn from all competitions, Whero Cup and Canterbury Championship.

==== Whero Cup teams ====
CCL	2023 season	MD1	2023 season	MD2	2023 season	CPL	2023 season
Cashmere Technical U20	DNP	Cashmere Technical Jets	R1	Burwood Reserves	R1	Cashmere Technical Reserves	DNP
Coastal Spirit U20	R1	Cashmere Technical Turtles	R2	FC Twenty 11 Bombers	R1	Christchurch United U20	1st
FC Twenty 11 U20	R1	Christchurch United Div 1	SF	FC Twenty 11 Falcons	Pango R1	Ferrymead Bays U20	R1
Ferrymead Bays Keen Lads	2nd	Ferrymead Bays Baby Blues	R1	Halswell United Goal Exchange	R2	Nomads United Reserves	DNP
Halswell United Reserves	R2	Halswell United 1964	R1	Methven	R1	Selwyn United U20	SF
Nomads United U20	DNP	Mid Canterbury United Blue	QF	SASFC Thunderpanthers	R2		
Selwyn United Turkeys	QF	Oxford	DNP	UCAFC Salamanders	DNP		
University of Canterbury 2nd XI	R2	University of Canterbury 4th XI	QF	Western Rhinos	R2		
University of Canterbury 3rd XI	QF	UCAFC Burger Station	R1				
Waimakariri United Reserves	R1	Western Reserves	DNP				

==== Whero Cup Preliminary Round ====
25 April 2024	Halswell United 1964's	5-2	FC Twenty 11 Bombers	Wigram
14:00		Report		Stadium: Te Kahu Park S1

==== Whero Cup Round 1 ====
25 April 2024	Coastal Spirit U20	~~0-8~~	~~Nomads United U20~~	Bromley
13:00		Report		Stadium: Linfield Park S2
Note: Nomads United got withdrawn from the competition

25 April 2024	Cashmere Technical Turtles	0-5	Ferrymead Bays U20	Hillmorton
14:00		Report		Stadium: Nga Puna Wai S2

25 April 2024	UCAFC Burger Station	0-3	Cashmere Technical Reserves	Ilam
14:00		Report		Stadium: Ilam Fields S1

25 April 2024	~~Methven~~	0-3	Nomads United Reserves	Methven
14:00		Report		Stadium: Methven Domain S1
Note: Methven defaulted

25 April 2024	Selwyn United U20	11-1	Christchurch United Division 1	Rolleston
14:00		Report		Stadium: Foster Park S5

25 April 2024	Ferrymead Bays Keen Lads	1-0	Christchurch United U20	Ferrymead
14:00		Report		Stadium: Ferrymead Park S2

25 April 2024	Burwood Reserves	3-7	Halswell United Reserves	Burwood
14:00		Report		Stadium: Burwood Park S1

25 April 2024	Selwyn United Turkeys	4-1	University of Canterbury 4th XI	Rolleston
14:00		Report		Stadium: Foster Park S4

25 April 2024	University of Canterbury 2nd XI	5-0	Halswell United Goal Exchange	Ilam
14:00		Report		Stadium: Ilam Fields S2

25 April 2024	Cashmere Technical Jets	4-2	UCAFC Salamanders	Hillmorton
14:00		Report		Stadium: Nga Puna Wai S1

25 April 2024	Waimakariri United Reserves	0-2	FC Twenty 11 Falcons	Kaiapoi
14:00		Report		Stadium: Kendall Park Turf

25 April 2024	Western Rhinos	5-1	FC Twenty 11 U20	Mairehau
14:00		Report		Stadium: Walter Park S2

7 May 2024	Cashmere Technical U20	3-0	~~Ferrymead Bays Baby Blues~~	Ferrymead
19:00		Report		Stadium: Ferrymead Park
Note: Ferrymead Bays defaulted

14 May 2024	Western Reserves	1-0	Halswell United 1964's	St Albans
19:30		Report		Stadium: English Park

21 May 2024	Oxford	3-2	Mid Canterbury United Blue	St Albans
19:30	Smoothy 6', 21'; Freire Trecu 76' (pen.)	Report		Stadium: English Park; Referee: Iain Marshall

29 May 2024	SASFC Thunderpanthers	4-4 (5-6 p)	University of Canterbury 3rd XI	St Albans
19:30		Report		Stadium: English Park

==== Whero Cup Round 2 ====
1 June 2024	Nomads United Reserves	2-6	University of Canterbury 2nd XI	Casebrook
11:00	Bingham 63' (pen.); Bimler (yellow card) 72'; Batten (yellow card) 85'; Worrall 85' (pen.)	Report	Sweetman 2'; Toplis 7' (yellow card) 60'; O'Brien 9'; Unwin (yellow card) 39'; Marron (yellow card) 27' (goal) 41'; Vaughan (yellow card) 45'; Cullwick (yellow card) 45'; Forman 75' (pen.); Cummins 77'	Stadium: Tulett Park S1; Referee: Thomas Lawson

1 June 2024	Western Rhinos	1-1 (5-4 p)	Western Reserves	Mairehau
12:30	No line-up submitted	Report	No line-up submitted	Stadium: Walter Park S1; Referee: Yash Naicker

1 June 2024	Ferrymead Bays U20	3-0	Ferrymead Bays Keen Lads	Ferrymead
12:30	Daeche 31', 44', 90' (pen.); Marson (yellow card) 54'; Williams (yellow card) 78'	Report	Osborne (yellow card) 65'	Stadium: Ferrymead Park; Referee: Michael Killick

1 June 2024	Halswell United Reserves	5-1	Coastal Spirit U20	Halswell
12:30	Kelly 49'; Hodge 65'; Leath 84'; Barrett 86'	Report	Reynolds 56'; Huddy 16' (o.g.)	Stadium: Halswell Domain S1; Referee: Chris O'Connell

1 June 2024	FC Twenty 11 Falcons	1-4	University of Canterbury 3rd XI	Avonhead
14:30	No line-up submitted	Report	Methven 3'; Lane 61'; Kendall 75'; Tausi 79'	Stadium: Avonhead Park S1; Referee: Simon Roydhouse

1 June 2024	Cashmere Technical U20	2-1	Selwyn United Turkeys	Woolston
14:30	Allen 57'; Moot (yellow card) 74'; Jeffrey-Dally 80'	Report	Busson 25'; Holcroft (yellow card) 65'; Mottus (yellow card) 90'; Cox (red card) After match'	Stadium: Garrick Memorial Park S1; Referee: Alex Dahlberg

1 June 2024	Oxford	1-0	Cashmere Technical Reserves	Oxford
14:30	Smoothy 12'	Report		Stadium: Pearsons Park S1; Referee: Roelof Boiten

1 June 2024	Cashmere Technical Jets	1-7	Selwyn United U20	Hillmorton
14:30	No line-up submitted	Report	Jones 7'; Sudlow 49'; Benseman 53'; Cotton 57'; Barrett 60'; Goodmanson 80'; Davies 82'	Stadium: Nga Puna Wai S2; Referee: Robert William Noster

==== Whero Cup Quarter Final ====
28 June 2024	Oxford	1-2	Cashmere Technical U20	Oxford
2:00 pm	Dunnink 2'	Report	Collins 17', 75'; Gerling (yellow card) 83'	Stadium: Pearsons Park S1; Referee: Roelof Boiten

28 June 2024	University of Canterbury 2nd XI	6-3	Ferrymead Bays U20	St Albans
2:00 pm	Forman 29', 47'; Marron 39'; Preshner 45'; Cullwick 64'	Report	Julve 70', 83'; Page 88'; Marson (yellow card) 90'	Stadium: English Park; Referee: Mark Currie

28 June 2024	Halswell United Reserves	1-2	University of Canterbury 3rd XI	Spreydon
2:00 pm	Prasad 41'	Report	McArdle 45' (pen.), 88'; Kampman (yellow card) 83'	Stadium: United Sports Centre; Referee: Alex Dahlberg

1 July 2024	Western Rhinos	1-6	Selwyn United U20	Rolleston
2:00 pm	No line-up submitted	Report	No timeline submitted	Stadium: Foster Park; Referee: Iain Marshall

==== Whero Cup Semi Final ====
11 August 2024	Cashmere Technical U20	0-6	Selwyn United U20	Rolleston
2:00 pm	Tukaiora (yellow card) 8'; Moot (yellow card) 33'	Report	Otaki 7', 55'; Hawkey (yellow card) 31' (goal) 45'; Cotton 53', 65', 87'	Stadium: Foster Park; Referee: Roelof Boiten

12 August 2024	University of Canterbury 3rd XI	1-1 (5-4 p)	University of Canterbury 2nd XI	St Albans
7:30 pm	McArdle (yellow card) 20' (yellow-red card) 89'; Sluiter 27'	Report	Toplis (yellow card) 30'; Marron 57'; Cummins (yellow card) 70'; Kirby Vaughan (yellow card) 75'	Stadium: English Park; Referee: Hubert Bakx

==== Whero Cup Final ====
31 August 2024	University of Canterbury 3rd XI	2–2 (5-4 p)	Selwyn United U20	St Albans
3:00 pm	McArdle 4', 6'; Sluiter (yellow card) 90'	Report	Davies 60' (yellow card) 90'; Fraser 27'	Stadium: English Park; Referee: Roelof Boiten

== Mainland Football 2024 Awards ==
Category	Men's Winner	Club	Women's Winner	Club
Player of the year	Alex Steinwascher	Coastal Spirit	Anna McPhie	Cashmere Technical (Note: Anna McPhie won the award while playing for Canterbury United Pride in the National League)
Youth player of the year	Riley Grover	Christchurch United (Note: Riley Grover won the award while playing for Coastal Spirit in the National League)	Amber de Wit	Nomads United (Note: Amber de Wit won the award while playing for Canterbury United Pride in the National League)
Goalkeeper of the year	Regan Frame	Nomads United	Amber Bennet	Cashmere Technical (Note: Amber Bennet won the award while playing for Canterbury United Pride in the National League)
Defender of the year	Daniel Boys	Coastal Spirit	Lara Wall	Cashmere Technical (Note: Lara Wall won the award while playing for Wellington Phoenix in the A-League Women)
Midfielder of the year	David Yoo	Christchurch United (Note: David Yoo won the award while playing for Coastal Spirit in the National League)	Anna McPhie	Cashmere Technical
Forward of the year	Alex Steinwascher	Coastal Spirit	Aimee Phillips	Cashmere Technical (Note: Aimee Phillips won the award while playing for Western Springs in the National League)
Coach of the year	Robbie Stanton	Coastal Spirit	Shane Verma	Cashmere Technical (Note: Shane Verma won the award while coaching for Canterbury United Pride in the National League)

Category	Winner
Team of the year (Men)	Coastal Spirit
Team of the year (Women)	Cashmere Technical
Referee of the Year	Ben O'Connell
Eileen Langridge Administrator of the year	Matt Hastings
Jack Killick Spirit of Refereeing	Paul Dalziel
