= University of Canterbury AFC =

Universities of Canterbury AFC
- Full name: Universities of Canterbury Association Football Club
- Nicknames: UC, Uni, Universities, UC Football
- Founded: 1945
- Ground: Ilam Fields, Ilam
- President: Olivia Yardley
- Coach: Patrick Morris
- League: Canterbury Premiership
- 2026: Canterbury Premiership, 10th of 10
- Website: https://www.ucfootball.co.nz/

Universities of Canterbury AFC is an association football club in Christchurch, New Zealand, made up of students from University of Canterbury and Lincoln University. The Men's First team competes in the Canterbury Premiership League and has previously competed in the Southern League. The Women's First team competes in the Women's South Island League.

They are based at Ilam Fields, with the men's first team also participates in the Chatham Cup, New Zealand's premier knockout tournament and the English Cup, Canterbury's knockout tournament. The Women's First team competes in the Kate Sheppard Cup, the Women's version of the Chatham Cup, and the Reta Fitzpatrick Cup, the Women's version of the English Cup.

== History ==
On 12 April 1945, the Canterbury University College Club was granted affiliation to the Canterbury Football Association.

The clubs best run in the Chatham Cup was in 2016 where they made it to the final 16, before losing 3–0 to Cashmere Technical. The best run in the Kate Sheppard Cup was in 2018 were they made it to the final 16, before losing 7–1 to Dunedin Technical.

In 2023, Universities of Canterbury won the Canterbury Premiership League and played off against FC Nelson, winning 5–3 win on aggregate. Then they faced Roslyn-Wakari, drawing 2–2 on aggregate, and winning on penalty shootout 6–5 after extra time.

In 2026, after finishing 9th in both the 2024 and 2025, University withdrew from the competition and competed in the Canterbury Premiership where they came last, pending another relegation to the Canterbury Championship League. With FC Twenty 11 being the only other club to be relegated from the Southern League to the Premiership to the Championship in consecutive seasons a year prior. University's second team was in the Premiership before having to be relegated to the Championship due to a rule only allowing one team per club in the league.

== Home grounds ==
They are based at Ilam Fields in an area beside University of Canterbury's main campus, with their senior first teams play their home fixtures at English Park. They also play on other grounds around the city including Ferrier Park and Ray Blank Park.

== Club officials ==
=== Technical officials ===
Position	Name
Men's Head coach	(New Zealand) Patrick Morris
Men's Assistant coach	Position Vacant
Men's Team manager	(New Zealand) Laura Tosse
Goalkeeping coach	(New Zealand) James Anderson
Women's Head coach	(New Zealand) Jonte Clifton
Women's Assistant coach	(New Zealand) Owen Rees
Women's Team manager	(New Zealand) Alex Ivory

=== Management ===
Position	Name
President	(New Zealand) Olivia Yardley
Vice-President	(New Zealand) Matt Hodgett

== Honours ==
Men's First Team

- Canterbury Premiership League: 2023
- Southern League play-off series Winner: 2023

Women's First Team

- Canterbury Women's Premiership League: 2024

== Season by season ==
Season	League	Div	League									Chatham Cup
Season	League	Div	P	W	D	L	F	A	GD	Pts	Pos	Chatham Cup
Senior (Men's)
1998	Premier	2	21	2	3	16	20	55	-35	9	8th	—N/a
1999	Premier	2	21	13	1	7	47	27	20	40	4th	R1
2000	Premier	2	20	5	4	11	16	50	-34	19	9th	—N/a
2001	Premier	2	22	4	3	15	27	64	-37	15	10th	PR
2002	Premier	2	22	5	3	14	30	63	-33	18	11th	—N/a
2014	Premier	2	21	4	4	13	25	40	-15	16	7th	R3
2015	Premier	2	21	6	4	11	27	37	-10	22	5th	R1
2016	Premier	2	21	4	6	11	25	39	-14	18	6th	R4
2017	Premier	2	21	2	3	16	16	62	-46	9	7th	R2
2018	Premier	2	14	1	0	13	14	55	-41	3	8th	R1
2018	Qualifying	3	8	2	0	6	13	23	-10	6	3rd	R1
2019	Championship	3	12	3	3	6	12	25	-13	12	6th	PR
2019	Qualifying	3	21	7	3	11	32	47	-15	24	6th	PR
2020	Championship R1	3	14	1	3	10	21	41	-20	6	8th	—N/a
2020	Championship R2	3	3	0	0	3	1	9	-8	0	4th	—N/a
2021	Championship	4	14	4	0	10	27	31	-4	12	6th	—N/a
2022	Premiership	3	18	7	5	6	31	31	0	26	5th	R1
2023	Premiership	3	21	15	5	1	60	19	41	50	1st	R2
2024	Southern League	2	18	3	2	13	21	46	−25	11	9th	R2
2025	Southern League	2	18	1	2	15	20	78	−58	5	9th	R2
2026	Premiership	3	18	2	4	12	20	52	-32	10	10th	PR
2027	Championship	4	To Be Decided									TBD

Playoffs
Season	Division	P	W	D	L	GF	GA	Aggregate	Against
Senior (Men's)
2023	SL Promotion	4	1	2	1	7	5	5–3	FC Nelson
2023	SL Promotion	4	1	2	1	7	5	2–2 (6-5 p)	Roslyn Wakari
