= 2019 Kate Sheppard Cup =

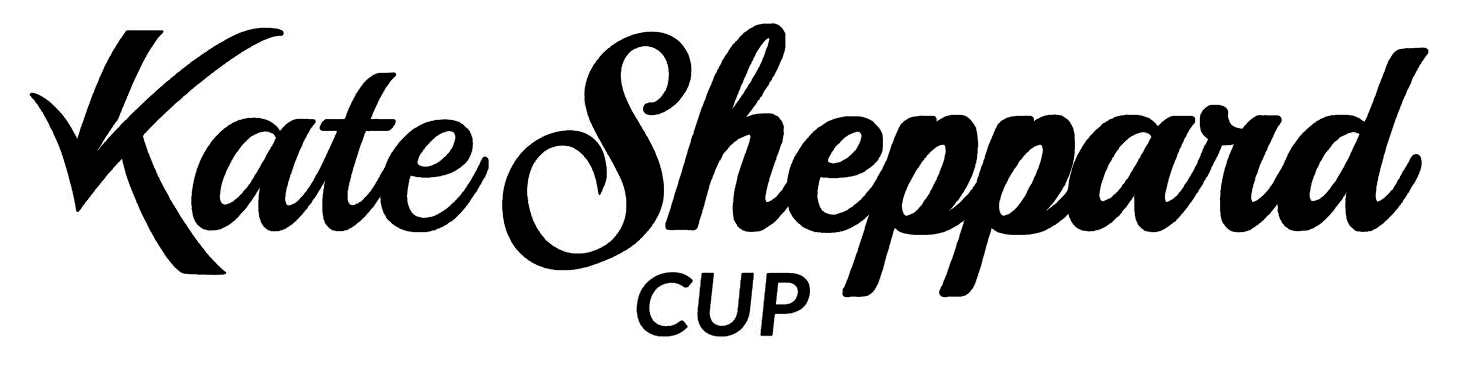

Tournament details
- Country: New Zealand
- Venue(s): QBE Stadium, Auckland
- Dates: 12 May 2019 – 8 September 2019
- Teams: 40

Final positions
- Champions: Eastern Suburbs
- Runners-up: Coastal Spirit

Tournament statistics
- Matches played: 39
- Goals scored: 194 (4.97 per match)

Awards
- Maia Jackman Trophy: Tayla O'Brien and Erinna Wong

The 2019 Kate Sheppard Cup is New Zealand's women's 25th annual knockout football competition. This is the second year that the competition is known by the Kate Sheppard Cup, or New Zealand Football Foundation Kate Sheppard Cup for sponsorship purposes, after previously been known as the Women's Knockout Cup since its establishment.

The 2019 competition has three rounds before quarter-finals, semi-finals, and a final. Competition will run in three regions (northern, central/capital, southern) until the quarter-finals, from which stage the draw will be open. In all, 40 teams entered the competition.

== Results ==
=== Round 1 ===
All matches were played on the weekend of 11–12 May 2019.

Central/Capital Region

12 May 2019	Brooklyn Northern United	0–4	Victoria University	Wakefield Park, Wellington
13:00		Report

12 May 2019	Petone	1–0	Stop Out	Petone Memorial Park, Lower Hutt
13:00		Report

12 May 2019	Kapiti Coast United	0–7	Waterside Karori	Weka Park, Kāpiti Coast
13:00		Report

Mainland Region

11 May 2019	Halswell United	9–1	Christchurch United	Halswell Domain, Christchurch
12:30		Report

11 May 2019	Cashmere Technical	0–1	Waimakariri United	Garrick Memorial Park, Christchurch
12:30		Report

11 May 2019	Universities	0–3	Coastal Spirit	Ilam Fields, Christchurch
12:30		Report

Southern Region

11 May 2019	Mosgiel	0–10	Otago University	Mosgiel Memorial Park, Mosgiel
13:00		Report

11 May 2019	Roslyn Wakari	4–3	Queenstown	Ellis Park, Dunedin
13:00		Report

All teams listed below received byes to the second round.
Northern Region: Hibiscus Coast, Forrest Hill Milford United, Glenfield Rovers, Waitemata, Warkworth, Three Kings United, Central United, Ellerslie, Eastern Suburbs, Western Springs, Bucklands Beach, Papakura City, Onehunga Sports, Waiuku, Claudelands Rovers, Hamilton Wanderers.
Central/Capital Region: Palmerston North Marist, Wairarapa United, Seatoun, Western Suburbs, Wellington United.
Mainland Region: Nelson Suburbs.
Southern Region: Dunedin Technical, Green Island.

=== Round 2 ===
All matches were played on Queen's Birthday weekend 31 May - 3 June 2019.

Northern Region

2 June 2019	Waiuku	0–11	Waitemata	Massey Park, Auckland
11:00		Report

2 June 2019	Papakura City	3–0*	Warkworth	McLennan Park, Auckland
13:00		Report

2 June 2019	Hibiscus Coast	1–2	Onehunga Sports	Stanmore Bay Park, Whangaparaoa
13:00		Report

2 June 2019	Ellerslie	0–3	Hamilton Wanderers	Michaels Ave Reserve, Auckland
14:00		Report

3 June 2019	Western Springs	7–0	Bucklands Beach	Seddon Fields, Auckland
13:00		Report

3 June 2019	Claudelands Rovers	0–4	Eastern Suburbs	Galloway Park, Auckland
13:00		Report

3 June 2019	Glenfield Rovers	7–1	Central United	McFetridge Park, Auckland
14:00		Report

3 June 2019	Three Kings United	2–6 (a.e.t.)	Forrest Hill Milford United	Keith Hay Park, Auckland
14:00		Report

Central/Capital Region

1 June 2019	Petone	1–2	Wellington United	Memorial Park, Lower Hutt
11:00		Report

1 June 2019	Seatoun	1–4	Waterside Karori	Seatoun Park, Wellington
12:00		Report

1 June 2019	Wairarapa United	3–0	Victoria University	Memorial Park Turf, Masterton
13:00		Report

1 June 2019	Western Suburbs	4–3	Palmerston North Marist	Endeavour Park, Wellington
14:00		Report

Mainland Region

3 June 2019	Coastal Spirit	10–0	Nelson Suburbs	English Park, Christchurch
11:00		Report

3 June 2019	Halswell United	0–3	Waimakariri United	Halswell Domain, Christchurch
12:30		Report

Southern Region

1 June 2019	Roslyn Wakari	2–2 (a.e.t.) (4–3 p)	Green Island	Ellis Park, Dunedin
13:00		Report

1 June 2019	Otago University	0–3	Dunedin Technical	Dunedin Artificial Turf, Dunedin
13:00		Report

* Match defaulted by Warkworth.

=== Round 3 ===
All matches were played on the weekend 15–16 June 2019.

Northern Region

16 June 2019	Glenfield Rovers	0–1	Forrest Hill Milford United	McFetridge Park, Auckland
13:00		Report

16 June 2019	Eastern Suburbs	4–1	Onehunga Sports	Madills Farm, Auckland
		Report

16 June 2019	Waitemata	2–6	Hamilton Wanderers	McLeod Park, Auckland
13:00		Report

16 June 2019	Papakura City	2–6	Western Springs	McLennan Park, Auckland
14:00		Report

Central/Capital Region

16 June 2019	Waterside Karori	2–4	Wellington United
14:00		Report		Attendance: Karori Park, Wellington

16 June 2019	Wairarapa United	2–1	Western Suburbs	Memorial Park, Masterton
		Report

Mainland

16 June 2019	Waimakariri United	2–4	Coastal Spirit	Rangiora A&P Showgrounds, Rangiora
12:30		Report

Southern Region

16 June 2019	Dunedin Technical	10–0	Roslyn Wakari	Logan Park Turf, Dunedin
		Report

=== Quarter-finals ===
All matches were played on the weekend 6–7 July 2019.

Northern Region

7 July 2019	Hamilton Wanderers	2–0	Western Springs	Porritt Stadium, Hamilton
14:00	Larose 42', 78'	Report

7 July 2019	Forrest Hill Milford United	1–1 (a.e.t.) (3–4 p)	Eastern Suburbs	Becroft Park, Auckland
14:00	Brown 44'	Report	Byrne 8'

Central/Capital Region

6 July 2019	Wellington United	4–1	Wairarapa United	Newtown Park, Wellington
13:00	Robertson 24'; Blackham 53'; Main 55', 80'	Report	Boone 37'

Mainland/Southern Region

6 July 2019	Dunedin Technical	1–1 (a.e.t.) (4–6 p)	Coastal Spirit	Logan Park Artificial, Dunedin
18:30	Roseke 117'	Report	Cameron 98'

=== Semi-finals ===
Matches were played on the weekend 24–25 August 2019.

24 August 2019	Wellington United	0–1 (a.e.t.)	Coastal Spirit	Newtown Park, Wellington
13:00		Report	Jones 100'

25 August 2019	Hamilton Wanderers	1–2 (a.e.t.)	Eastern Suburbs	Porritt Stadium, Hamilton
14:00	Wisnewski 90'	Report	Byrne 90', 99'

== Final ==
The final was played on the 8 September 2019 and saw Eastern Suburbs win their first Kate Sheppard Cup as well as completing a league-cup double after earlier winning the Northern Region Football League's premier women's division. The final was played at North Harbour Stadium before the men's Chatham Cup final. This was Eastern Suburbs's third finals appearance, having lost twice previously in 2005 and 2017. It was also Coastal Spirit third appearance however while they lost in their first appearance in 2011, they had won the cup before in 2013 in a final that was played at home in Christchurch.

An early goal to Suburbs inside the first five minutes to Hannah Pilley was quickly followed up by Tayla O'Brien in the ninth. Pilley got her second in the 25th minute and by that stage Suburbs was controlling the game. O'Brien got her second in the 35th minute which saw Suburbs go into the half up four nil. Suburbs controlled the second half and while they had a few more chances they also kept Coastal scoreless, leaving the final score the half time score. Tayla O’Brien was jointly awarded the Maia Jackman trophy for the most valuable player with Suburbs fullback Erinna Wong.

8 September 2019	Coastal Spirit	0–4	Eastern Suburbs	North Harbour Stadium, Auckland
12:00		Report	Pilley 4', 25'; O’Brien 9', 35'
