= Canterbury Championship League =

- Organising body: Mainland Football
- Founded: 2016
- Country: New Zealand
- Confederation: OFC (Oceania)
- Number of clubs: 10
- Level on pyramid: 4
- Promotion to: Canterbury Premiership League
- Relegation to: Canterbury Senior Men's Division 1
- Domestic cup: Chatham Cup
- League cup(s): English Cup; Whero Cup
- Current champions: Coastal Spirit U20 Reserves (1st title) (2026)
- Most championships: Western (2 titles)
- Website: Mainland Football
- Current: 2026 Canterbury Championship League

The Canterbury Championship League, also known as the New World Canterbury Championship League for sponsorship reasons, is a league competition run by Mainland Football for association football clubs located in Christchurch, New Zealand. It is at the fourth tier of New Zealand Football, below the Canterbury Premiership League and above the Canterbury Senior Men's Division 1.

The competition currently runs between March and August each year, and consists of ten team based in Christchurch. There are 18 round where the teams play each other twice. The winner of the league is promoted to the Canterbury Premiership League and the last place is relegated to Canterbury Senior Men's Division 1.

== History ==
In March 2021, after New Zealand Football announced the changes to the structure of both the premiership and the top regional leagues around the country, Mainland Football changed the Canterbury Championship League for the 2022 season. The change was, 3 pools of six team, consisting of six Canterbury Southern League U20 Reserve teams, five Canterbury Premiership Reserve teams, six Division 1 teams, and one first team. The winners of; pool A were Selwyn United U20 Reserves, pool B were Christchurch United U20 Academy, and pool C were Coastal Spirit U20 Reserves. The top 3 teams from each pool plus Halswell United Reserves, played a 9-game Senior Men's Division 1 Championship with Cashmere Technical U20 Reserves winning.

In 2023, the 2022 Senior Men's Division 1 Championship winners Cashmere Technical U20 Reserves and runners-up Nomads United U20 Reserves were both promoted to the Canterbury Premiership League. Seven of the ten teams were promoted to Canterbury Championship, followed by the addiction of Ferrymead Bays Keen Lads, University of Canterbury 3rd XI and Waimakariri United Reserves. Christchurch United U20 Academy won the 2023 league thus being promoted to the Premiership, followed by Ferrymead Bays U20 Reserves and Selwyn United U20 Reserves for the following season.

In 2024, Cashmere Technical U20 Reserves and Nomads United U20 Reserves both returned to the league following the success of having a reserve team in the Premiership, they were invited to add a team to the Championship. They also welcomed Selwyn United Turkeys with the success of winning Senior Men's Division 1 and 2 in the last two years. On 2 May, 4 matches into the season, Nomads United U20 Reserves were withdrawn from the competition after failing to field a team three games in a row, with one game being a postponement against University of Canterbury 3rd XI and the other two games being defaults against Selwyn United Turkeys and Coastal Spirit U20 Reserves. All wins and game results against Nomads United U20 Reserves have been voided, even Nomads only game against Cashmere Technical U20 Reserves, 0–8 win for Cashmere Technical.

== Canterbury Championship League teams ==
As of 2026 season.

Team	Home Ground	Location	2024 season
Cashmere Technical (U)	Garrick Memorial Park	Woolston	7th
Coastal Spirit (U)	Linfield Park	Bromley	3rd
FC Twenty 11	Avonhead Park	Avonhead	11th in Premiership (relegated)
FC Twenty 11 (R)	Avonhead Park	Avonhead	9th
Ferrymead Bays Keen Lads	Ferrymead Park	Ferrymead	2nd
Halswell United (R)	Halswell Domain	Halswell	8th
Parklands United	Parklands Reserve	Parklands	4th
Selwyn United Turkeys	Foster Park	Rolleston	1st
University of Canterbury (R)	Ilam Field	Ilam	10th in Premiership (relegated)
University of Canterbury (T)	Ilam Field	Ilam	5th

(R) — Denotes club's Reserve team
(T) — Denotes club's Third team
(U) — Denotes club's Under 20 Reserve team

== Winners ==
Canterbury Champions League:

2016–21

- 2016 - Nomads United
- 2017 - Selwyn United
- 2018 - Western
- 2019 - Christchurch United
- 2020 - Halswell United
- 2021 - Western

Club	Number of Titles	Year(s) Won
Western	2	2018, 2021
Nomads United	1	2016
Selwyn United	1	2017
Christchurch United	1	2019
Halswell United	1	2020

2023–present

- 2023 - Christchurch United U20 Reserves
- 2024 - University of Canterbury 2nd XI
- 2025 - Selwyn United Turkeys
- 2026 - Coastal Spirit U20 Reserves

Club	Number of Titles	Year(s) Won
Christchurch United U20 Reserves	1	2023
University of Canterbury 2nd XI	1	2024
Selwyn United Turkeys	1	2025
Coastal Spirit U20 Reserves	1	2026

== Whero Cup ==
The Whero Cup, is an annual Mainland Football knockout football competition for Canterbury Championship League, Senior Men's Division 1 and Canterbury Premiership League's Reserve teams. First played during the 2023 season. It is currently known as City Mission Whero Cup after its charity, Christchurch City Mission, this is the first season of City Mission being the charity. The cup has been previously known as the Ronald McDonald House Whero Cup after its charity Ronald McDonald House South Island for the 2023 to 2024 season. There are three other men's cups that run at the same time for the lower Senior Men's Divisions.

Whero Cup Winners

- 2023 - Christchurch United U20 Reserves
- 2024 - University of Canterbury 3rd XI
- 2025 - Ferrymead Bays U20 Reserves
- 2026 - Christchurch United U20 Reserves

Club	Number of Titles	Year(s) Won
Christchurch United U20 Reserves	2	2023, 2026
University of Canterbury 3rd XI	1	2024
Ferrymead Bays U20 Reserves	1	2025
