= FC Nelson =

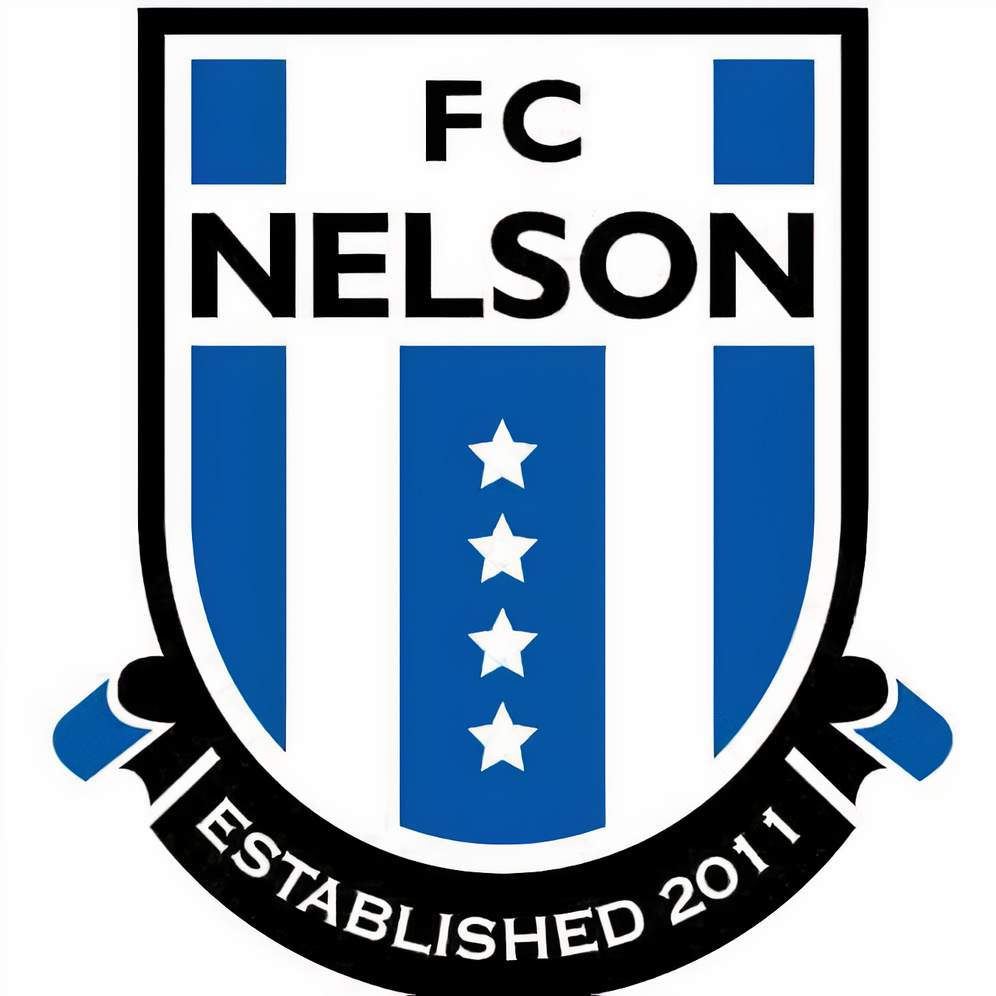
- Full name: Football Club Nelson
- Nicknames: FC, The Stripes
- Founded: 2011 (amalgamation of clubs which trace their origin to 1968)
- Ground: Guppy Park, Nelson
- Chairman: Phil Thompson
- Manager: Davor Tavich
- League: Nelson Premiership Division 1
- 2026: Nelson Premiership Division 1, 1st of 6
- Website: https://www.fcnelson.co.nz/
Home colours

FC Nelson is an amateur football club, based in Nelson, New Zealand. The club's home ground is Guppy Park. The club competes in the Nelson Premiership Division 1.

== History ==
The team was founded in 2011 through the amalgamation of Nelson United (founded 1968), Nelson Metro (founded 1975), Nelson City (founded 1977) and Tahuna Juniors At the time of merging the clubs had over 900 members across junior, youth, men's and women's grades, making FC Nelson the largest club in the Nelson/Marlborough region.

Nelson United played in the old New Zealand National Soccer League top flight 1977–80, 1983–88, and 1991–93. They were winners of the 1977 Chatham Cup, and were finalists in 1978. Nelson Metro's best run in the Chatham Cup was in 1976 progressing to the fourth round before losing to Waterside Karori. Nelson City's best run was in the 1977 Chatham Cup, making it through to the third round before losing to local rivals Nelson Suburbs.

FC Nelson has continued the tradition of playing in the Chatham Cup, entering each year since the club was formed. Although the team frequently exit the competition in the first or second round, the club advanced to the third round in 2016, its best ever finish (in its current form).. It repeated this feat in 2024 with a landmark 2-1 win over Nelson Suburbs in the second round, before bowing out to Ferrymead Bays in the next round. The club also entered a women's team for the first time in the Kate Sheppard Cup in 2013, beating University of Canterbury AFC 1–0 before going out in the second round.

FC Nelson has won the Nelson Division One trophy a number of times, including 2012, 2013, 2017 (where a 10-0 victory against Wakefield FC saw Richmond Athletic pipped on the final day), 2019 and 2023, 2024 and 2026. The latter year saw the FC First XI go unbeaten, with FC teams also winning the 2nd and 3rd Senior Mens divisions, completing a historic first for Mainland football. The club has also won the Nelson Women's league in 2014. FC Nelson's success regionally makes it a consistent contender for the Southern League.

FC Nelson has attempted promotion to the Southern League in the 2020s, losing in the promotion playoffs in 2023, 2024 and 2025. In 2023, the club defeated UC Football 1-0 in the first leg, before going down 3-0 in the second leg. In 2024, FC Nelson defeated Waimakariri United 3-2 in the first leg away from home, but lost 4-3 at home and were defeated on penalty kicks. 2025 saw FC Nelson lose 3-1 to Halswell United in the first leg, with a 3-2 victory in the return leg at home not enough to avoid defeat on aggregate.

With the change in New Zealand National League format, FC Nelson has been confirmed to participate in the 2027 Southern League, where the club will participate in the Northern division alongside Nelson Suburbs and teams from Christchurch.

In 2020, FC Nelson formed a partnership with Nelson College to give school players equal access to resources and opportunities: allowing Nelson College players wear the black and white stripes of FC during the winter season, and the school blue during tours and competitions. This connection to local schools was bolstered with a second Memorandum of Understanding with Nelson College for Girls in February the following year. 2021 saw the opening of the FC Nelson Academy, providing high quality coaching for the player base. Since 2022, FC Nelson has been a partner of Wellington Phoenix FC, running a Pre-Academy for Youth and Juniors. Since the beginning of this relationship, four players have gone on from FC to join the Phoenix in Wellington.

With a strong community presence, FC has a range of Men's teams representing ethnic and cultural groups, such as the Chin, Karen, and Karenni people of Myanmar. There is also consistent Colombian, Somali, Brazilian, and Indian presence throughout all grades. The club works in partnership with Sport Tasman, Multicultural Nelson Tasman and the Nelson City Council to host annual Multicultural football tournaments.

== Season by season record ==
2023– (Nelson Men's Premiership Division 1)

Season	Nelson Men's Premiership Division 1									Chatham Cup
Season	P	W	D	L	F	A	GD	Pts	Pos	Chatham Cup
2023	14	12	2	2	40	13	+27	38	1st	R1
2024	14	8	4	2	27	14	+13	28	3rd	R3
2025	12	10	1	1	49	11	+38	31	1st	R1
2026	15	14	0	1	64	9	+55	42	1st	R2

Playoffs
Season	Division	P	W	D	L	GF	GA	Aggregate	Against
Senior (Men's)
2019	Mainland Promotion	2	0	0	2	9	2	2–9	Christchurch United
2023	Mainland Playoffs	2	1	0	1	5	4	4–5	University of Canterbury
2024	Mainland Playoffs	2	1	0	1	6	6	6–6 (3–4 p)	Waimakariri United
2025	Mainland Playoffs	2	1	0	1	5	4	4–5	Halswell United

Chatham Cup
Preceded by Christchurch United	Winner*; 1977 Chatham Cup	Succeeded by Manurewa
