= Reta Fitzpatrick Cup =

Annual Mainland football Cup Competition

- Organiser(s): Mainland Football
- Founded: 1974; 52 years ago
- Region: Canterbury
- Teams: 9 teams (2024)
- Domestic cup: Kate Sheppard Cup
- Current champions: Cashmere Technical (6th title)
- Most championships: Coastal Spirit and Nomads United (10 titles each)
- Website: Mainland Football
- 2024 Reta Fitzpatrick Cup

The Reta Fitzpatrick Cup, is an annual New Zealand knockout football competition for Mainland Football women's first teams. First played during the 1974 season, it has been running on for 20 years longer than the Kate Sheppard Cup. It is organised by and named after Mainland Football. It has been known as the Morrison Mitsubishi Reta Fitzpatrick after its headline sponsor. A concurrent Men's Cup has been held since 1913 called English Cup.

The tournament consists of 1 randomly drawn round followed by the semi-finals and the final. All quarter-final, semi-finals and final games are hosted at English Park during the week, generally on a Tuesday at 7:00pm. Entrants are not seeded, and depending on the number of teams there are, teams can receive byes.

== History ==
The cup is named after Reta Fitzpatrick who was one of the early pioneers for the women's game in Canterbury. Reta, was a manageress (called the team chaperone in the 70's) for many seasons at club level for Rangers (now Coastal Spirit). She also occupied this role for Canterbury from 1976 until 1992. Outside of this responsibility she also filled many other roles on the committee at Rangers as well as serving on the Canterbury Women's Football Association - (CWFA) for three decades and was made a life member at both Rangers and the CWFA. The Canterbury Women's Football Knockout Cup was first contested in 1974 when the top women's clubs included the likes of Halswell, New Brighton, Rangers and Nomads. Halswell went on to win the very first Cup competition in 1974. In 2005 the Knock Out Cup was renamed The Reta Fitzpatrick Cup with Reta on hand to hand over the trophy for the first time to inaugural winners New Brighton. It is testament to Reta's legacy that the Cup remains a much sort after trophy on the Canterbury sporting landscape - and we pay homage to the numerous hours of volunteer support Reta gave to football within the region.

== Winners ==
Since its establishment, the Reta Fitzpatrick Cup has been won by 12 different teams. Teams shown in italics are no longer in existence.

Results by Club
Club	Wins	Years
Coastal Spirit	10	2008, 2009, 2011, 2012, 2014, 2015, 2017, 2020, 2021, 2022
Nomads United	10	1980, 1981, 1982, 1983, 1988, 1989, 1990, 1991, 1992, 1993
Rangers	8	1976, 1977, 1984, 1985, 1986, 1987, 2001, 2002
New Brighton	6	1975, 1996, 1997, 2000, 2005, 2006
Cashmere Technical	6	2016, 2019, 2023, 2024, 2025, 2026
not contested	4	1999, 2003, 2004, 2010
Halswell United	3	1974, 1978, 1979
Hillsborough	1	1994
Kaiapoi Town	1	1995
Avonhead	1	1998
Canterbury Pride Youth	1	2007
Western	1	2013
Waimakariri United	1	2018

Results by current Clubs
Club	Wins	Years
Coastal Spirit (Note: Coastal Spirit have won the Reta Fitzpatrick Cup 10 times (2008, 2009, 2011, 2012, 2014, 2015, 2017, 2020, 2021, 2022), and the two merging club have (Rangers have won the cup 8 times (1976, 1977, 1984, 1985, 1986, 1987, 2001, 2002) and New Brighton have won the cup 6 times (1975, 1996, 1997, 2000, 2005, 2006)))	24	1975, 1976, 1977, 1984, 1985, 1986, 1987, 1996, 1997, 2000, 2001, 2002, 2005, 2006, 2008, 2009, 2011, 2012, 2014, 2015, 2017, 2020, 2021, 2022
Nomads United	10	1980, 1981, 1982, 1983, 1988, 1989, 1990, 1991, 1992, 1993
Cashmere Technical	6	2016, 2019, 2023, 2024, 2025, 2026
not contested	4	1999, 2003, 2004, 2010
Halswell United	3	1974, 1978, 1979
Waimakariri United (Note: Waimakariri United have won the Reta Fitzpatrick Cup once (2018), and one of the merging club have, Kaiapoi Town have won the cup once (1995).)	2	1995, 2018
Hillsborough	1	1994
Avonhead	1	1998
Canterbury Pride Youth	1	2007
Western	1	2013

== MVP ==
MVP winners by year
Season	Club	Player
2023	Nicola Dominikovich	Cashmere Technical
2024	Emma Kench	Cashmere Technical
2025	Anya Stephan	Cashmere Technical
2026	Kate Loye	Cashmere Technical
