= Alex Steinwascher =

American soccer player (born 2000)

Personal information
- Full name: Alejandro Steinwascher
- Date of birth: September 5, 2000 (age 26)
- Place of birth: Sterling Heights, Michigan, United States
- Height: 1.80 m (5 ft 11 in)
- Position: Forward

Team information
- Current team: Milwaukee Wave

College career
Years	Team	Apps	(Gls)
2018–2021	Indianapolis Greyhounds	79	(38)
2022	Xavier Musketeers	18	(3)

Senior career*
Years	Team	Apps	(Gls)
2021–2022	Oakland County	12	(2)
2022–2023	Milwaukee Wave (indoor)	9	(1)
2023	Union Omaha	22	(2)
2024	Coastal Spirit	26	(25)
2024–	Milwaukee Wave (indoor)	0	(0)
- * Club domestic league appearances and goals as of November 24, 2024

Alex Steinwascher (born September 5, 2000) is an American soccer player who plays as a forward for the Milwaukee Wave in the Major Arena Soccer League.

== Career ==
=== College and amateur ===
Steinwascher attended the University of Indianapolis in 2018, where he went on to make 79 appearances for the Greyhounds, scoring 38 goals and tallying 25 assists. During his college career at Indianapolis, he was a back-to-back Great Lakes Valley Conference Offensive Player of the Year and a two-time First Team Conference selection. In 2022, he attended Xavier University as a graduate student, making 18 appearances for the Musketeers, scoring three goals and adding two assists.

In 2021 and 2022, Steinwascher played in the USL League Two with Oakland County FC, making two appearances and scoring a single goal in 2021, and added another goal in ten appearances in 2022.

=== Professional ===
In November 2022, Steinwascher spent a brief period with Milwaukee Wave out of Major Arena Soccer League. On March 7, 2023, Steinwascher signed with USL League One side Union Omaha ahead of their 2023 season.

=== Coastal Spirit ===
In 2024, Steinwascher moved to Christchurch, New Zealand, where he signed with Southern League side Coastal Spirit. On March 29, Steinwascher made his Southern League debut against Selwyn United and scored 4 goals. On September 1, Steinwascher helped Coastal Spirit secure their first New Zealand National League qualification with scoring his 19th Southern League goal of the season, breaking the previous club's top league season scorer of 8 goals. On September 7, Steinwascher won the 2024 English Cup and was awarded the Steve Summer Medal, most valuable player in the final, with 1 goal and 3 assists. At the 2024 Mainland Football Awards, Steinwascher won Men's Forward of the Year and Men's Player of the Year. A day later on October 19, Steinwascher scored a hat-trick against Wellington Phoenix Reserves.

== Career statistics ==
As of match played on November 24, 2024

Club	Season	League			National Cup		League Cup		Other		Total	
Club	Season	Division	Apps	Goals	Apps	Goals	Apps	Goals	Apps	Goals	Apps	Goals
Oakland County	2021	USL League Two	2	1	–		–		–		2	1
Oakland County	2022	USL League Two	10	1	–		–		–		10	1
Union Omaha	2023	USL League One	22	2	2	0	–		–		24	2
Coastal Spirit	2024	National League	26	25	6 (Note: Appearances and Goals in the Chatham Cup)	5	4 (Note: Appearances and Goals in the English Cup)	4	–		35	33
Career Total			60	29	8	5	4	4	0	0	72	37

== Honours ==
Coastal Spirit

- English Cup: 2024

Individual

- Mainland Football Men's Forward of the Year: 2024
- Mainland Football Men's Player of the Year: 2024
- Steve Summer Medal: 2024
