= Rangiora AFC =

New Zealand football club

Rangiora AFC was a football club in Rangiora, New Zealand. In 2009, Rangiora AFC and Kaiapoi FC merged to form Waimak United FC.
