= Selwyn United FC =

Selwyn United
- Full name: Selwyn United Football Club
- Founded: 2013
- Ground: Foster Park, Rolleston, New Zealand
- Coach: John Morgan (interim)
- League: Southern League
- 2026: Southern League, 10th of 10
- Website: https://sufc.co.nz/
Home colours

Selwyn United Football Club is a football club based in Rolleston in the Selwyn region of New Zealand. Formed in 2013 following the merger of Ellesmere FC and Rolleston FC, they currently compete in the Southern League.

The club also competes in the Chatham Cup, New Zealand's premier knockout tournaments for men. The best Selwyn United have done in the competition is make it to the third round, which they have done three times in 2016 and 2018 and 2021 before losing to local rivals Cashmere Technical each time.

In 2021, Selwyn United experienced its best-performing season in its history, finishing second in the Southern League and qualifying for the National League Championship. However, due to the impact of the COVID-19 pandemic, the National League was cancelled and Selwyn competed in the National League South Central Series instead

== Season by season record ==
2021– (National League)

Season	Southern League									National League									English Cup	Chatham Cup	Top scorer	
Season	P	W	D	L	F	A	GD	Pts	Pos	P	W	D	L	F	A	GD	Pts	Pos	English Cup	Chatham Cup	Name	Goals
2021	7	4	1	2	14	12	+2	13	2nd	5	0	1	4	4	15	−11	1	6th	SF	R2	(New Zealand) Luke Blackie, (New Zealand) Daniel Ede, (New Zealand) Jamie Carrodus	3
2022	18	2	5	11	27	48	-21	11	9th	Did not qualify									QF	R2	(New Zealand) Michael Hogan	6
2023	18	3	1	14	21	53	-32	10	9th	Did not qualify									QF	R1	(New Zealand) Darius van Wyk	5
2024	18	4	2	12	31	68	-37	14	8th	Did not qualify									R1	R2	(New Zealand) Finlay Cotton	7
2025	18	0	3	15	20	78	-58	3	10th	Did not qualify									R1	R2	(New Zealand) Finlay Cotton	6
2026	18	2	1	15	18	58	-40	7	10th	Did not qualify									QF	R1	(New Zealand) Liam Coleman	5

== Former players ==
- (Netherlands) Pieter-Taco Bierema

== Honours ==
- Canterbury Championship League: 2017
- Hurley Shield: 2021
