= Oxford FC =

- Full name: Oxford Football Club
- Founded: 2004
- Ground: Pearsons Park, Oxford
- League: Mainland Division 10
- 2026: Mainland Division 10, 3rd of 8
- Website: https://www.oxfordfc.co.nz/

Oxford FC is an association football club in Oxford, Canterbury, New Zealand. The club competes in the Mainland Division 10.

The club is based at Pearsons Park in Burnett Street in Oxford, approximately 1hr North-West of Christchurch in the foothills of the southern Alps. It is one of the smallest clubs in Mainland Football and in New Zealand as a whole, averaging 150-200 members per year. Membership fluctuates significantly due to rural economic factors and the distance to travel for competitive games. After struggling with the rising cost of upstream participation fees for over a decade, and nearly closing in 2022, the club introduced a strategy of Free Kids Football for all children under 16, the first of its kind in New Zealand, aimed at breaking down the affordability barriers for rural children. Since that time, the club has developed a ring-fenced in-house program for children between the ages of 5 to 10, as well as entering youth, senior and masters teams within the Mainland Football community competitions.

In 2023, the club became the first football club in New Zealand to be awarded Stage 1 accreditation to the New Zealand Football Xero Together Stronger - Safe For All program. In 2024, the club was announced as a finalist in the 2024 New Zealand Sport Awards for 'Community Impact' in recognition of the work that had been carried out to ensure local barriers to participation were removed.

The Men's First team competes in Mainland Football's Community Football Divisions. Their most successful period was between 2022 and 2025, climbing from Division 10 to the New World Championship.

Oxford FC competed in Division 10 in 2022, winning the league before regrading pushed them up to Division 8 half way through the season, winning both the leagues in the same season. In 2023, they competed in Division 4, again winning the league before regrading pushed them up to Division 3 half way through the season, where they won Division 3 as well.

In 2024, their 20th Anniversary year, they were meant to play in Division 2 but were offered the opportunity to compete in Division 1. They won Division 1 on their first attempt and got promoted to the Canterbury Championship League.

During the same season, they competed for the first time in the English Cup, Canterbury's regional cup tournament, beating Southern League team FC Twenty 11 in the first round to advance to the quarter-finals. Just a few days later, they competed in their first Chatham Cup competition match, losing to local rivals Waimak Utd. In 2025, they competed in the New World Championship, finishing mid-table, sixth out of ten teams.

In 2026, due to the rising costs of participating in higher league football, the club decided to refocus their attention on rebuilding the core of the senior football teams, focusing on developing a transitional pathway for local youth players into local community football, through a Division 9 team. The Masters team competes in the Centre Circle Division 3 Over 55's competition.
