= English Cup (Christchurch) =

Annual Mainland football Cup Competition

- Organiser(s): Mainland Football
- Founded: 1913; 113 years ago
- Region: Canterbury
- Teams: 13 (2026)
- Domestic cup: Chatham Cup
- Current champions: Ferrymead Bays (5th title)
- Most championships: Western (26 titles)
- Website: Mainland Football
- 2026 English Cup

The English Cup, is an annual New Zealand knockout football competition for Mainland Football men's first teams. First played during the 1913 season, it has been running on for 10 years longer than the Chatham Cup. It is organised by and named after Mainland Football. It has been known as the Morrison Mitsubishi English Cup after its headline sponsor. A concurrent Women's Cup has been held since 1974 called Reta Fitzpatrick Cup.

The tournament consists of 1 randomly drawn round followed by the quarter-final, semi-finals and the final. All quarter-final, semi-finals and final games are hosted at English Park during the week, generally on a Tuesday at 7:00pm. Entrants are not seeded, and depending on the number of teams there are, teams can receive byes.

== History ==
The cup is named after Robert English (1874-1934). Robert English was born in England and arrived in Christchurch in 1903 to work as an engineer for the Christchurch Gasworks and was president of the Canterbury Football Association from 1911 until 1928. He was largely responsible for the acquisition of English Park for the Canterbury Football Association code and the park was given his name in 1915 as a compliment to his work. He donated the English Cup for the knock-out competition in Canterbury first-grade Association football.

The first Cup Final, between Sydenham and Burnham, was played at the Canterbury Show Ground and required a replay before the Sydenham came back from 1 - 0 down at the break to win 3 - 2 to become the first name engraved on the trophy.

== Winners ==
Since its establishment, the English Cup has been won by 24 different teams. Teams shown in italics are no longer in existence.

Results by Club
Club	Wins	Years
Western	26	1925, 1930, 1931, 1935, 1936, 1937, 1938, 1939, 1940, 1941, 1943, 1944, 1945, 1946, 1949, 1950, 1954, 1955, 1961, 1965, 1967, 1980, 1988, 2001, 2005, 2014
Christchurch Technical	12	1928, 1947, 1952, 1953, 1956, 1966, 1969, 1971, 1974, 1993, 1996, 1999
Nomads United	11	1914, 1916 1919, 1920, 1922, 1924, 1960, 1962, 1963, 2006, 2008
Cashmere Technical	8	2015, 2017, 2018, 2019, 2020, 2021, 2022, 2025
Rangers	7	1917, 1918, 1921, 1923, 1979, 1994, 1995
Christchurch United	7	1982, 1983, 1985, 1989, 1990, 1991, 2023
Thistle	6	1929, 1930, 1933, 1934, 1945, 1948
Christchurch City	6	1957, 1958, 1959, 1964, 1968, 1972
Halswell United	6	1992, 1997, 1998, 2003, 2004, 2011
Ferrymead Bays	5	2009, 2012, 2013, 2016, 2026
RNZAF Wigram	2	1943, 1950
New Brighton	2	1986, 1987
Sydenham	1	1913
Christchurch United	1	1915
Sunnyside	1	1926
Villa	1	1927
Divisional Signals	1	1942
YMCA	1	1951
Burndale	1	1970
Timaru United	1	1981
Shamrock	1	1984
Christchurch City	1	2000
Woolston Technical	1	2007
Coastal Spirit	1	2024

Results by current Clubs
Club	Wins	Years
Western	26	1925, 1930, 1931, 1935, 1936, 1937, 1938, 1939, 1940, 1941, 1943, 1944, 1945, 1946, 1949, 1950, 1954, 1955, 1961, 1965, 1967, 1980, 1988, 2001, 2005, 2014
Cashmere Technical (Note: Cashmere Technical have won the English Cup 8 times (2015, 2017, 2018, 2019, 2020, 2021, 2022, 2025), and multiple merging clubs have. Christchurch Technical have won the cup 12 times (1928, 1947, 1952, 1953, 1956, 1966, 1969, 1971, 1974, 1993, 1996, 1999), Christchurch City (Briefly merged from Christchurch Technical and Woolston Working Men's Club in 2000-2002) have won the cup once (2000), Woolston Wanders (Merge from Christchurch Technical and Woolston Working Men's Club) have won the cup once (2007).)	22	1928, 1947, 1952, 1953, 1956, 1966, 1969, 1971, 1974, 1993, 1996, 1999, 2000, 2007, 2015, 2017, 2018, 2019, 2020, 2021, 2022, 2025
Christchurch United (Note: Christchurch United have won the English Cup 7 times (1982, 1983, 1985, 1989, 1990, 1991, 2023) and in 1973 amalgamated with Christchurch City, have won the cup 6 times (1957, 1958, 1959, 1964, 1968, 1972). YMCA which was what Christchurch City was known as before the name change in 1952, have won the cup once (1951).)	14	1951, 1957, 1958, 1959, 1964, 1968, 1972, 1982, 1983, 1985, 1989, 1990, 1991, 2023
Nomads United	11	1914, 1916, 1919, 1920, 1922, 1924, 1960, 1962, 1963, 2006, 2008
Coastal Spirit (Note: Coastal Spirit have won English Cup once (2024). The two merging club have Christchurch Rangers and New Brighton (merged in 2008). Rangers have won the cup 7 time (1917, 1918, 1921, 1923, 1979, 1994, 1995), New Brighton have won the cup twice (1986, 1987).)	10	1917, 1918, 1921, 1923, 1979, 1986, 1987, 1994, 1995, 2024
Thistle	6	1929, 1930, 1933, 1934, 1945, 1948
Halswell United	6	1992, 1997, 1998, 2003, 2004, 2011
Ferrymead Bays	5	2009, 2012, 2013, 2016, 2026
RNZAF Wigram	2	1943, 1950
FC Twenty 11 (Note: FC Twenty 11 have not won an English Cup, the closest they have gotten is runners-up in 2017. The two merging club have, Avon United and Burnside (merged in 2011). Avon United is a merger from Riccarton and Shamrock in 1996, while Burnside used to be known as Burndale United until 1993. Burndale have won the cup once (1970), Shamrock have won the cup once (1984).)	2	1970, 1984
Sydenham	1	1913
Christchurch United (Note: Unknown if its Christchurch United, mostly likely not due to the dates.)	1	1915
Sunnyside	1	1926
Villa	1	1927
Divisional Signals	1	1942
Timaru United	1	1981

== Steve Summer Medal ==
Steve Summer Medal Winners by year
Season	Club	Player
2017	Danny Boys	Cashmere Technical
2018	Sean Liddicoat	Coastal Spirit
2019	Benji Lapslie	Cashmere Technical
2020	Lyle Mattysen	Cashmere Technical
2021	Fraser Angus	Cashmere Technical
2022	Garbhan Coughlan	Cashmere Technical
2023	Matt Tod-Smith	Christchurch United
2024	Alex Steinwascher	Coastal Spirit
2025	Lyle Mattysen	Cashmere Technical
2026	Luke Pritchard	Ferrymead Bays
