= Ferrymead Regional Park =

Regional park in Christchurch, New Zealand

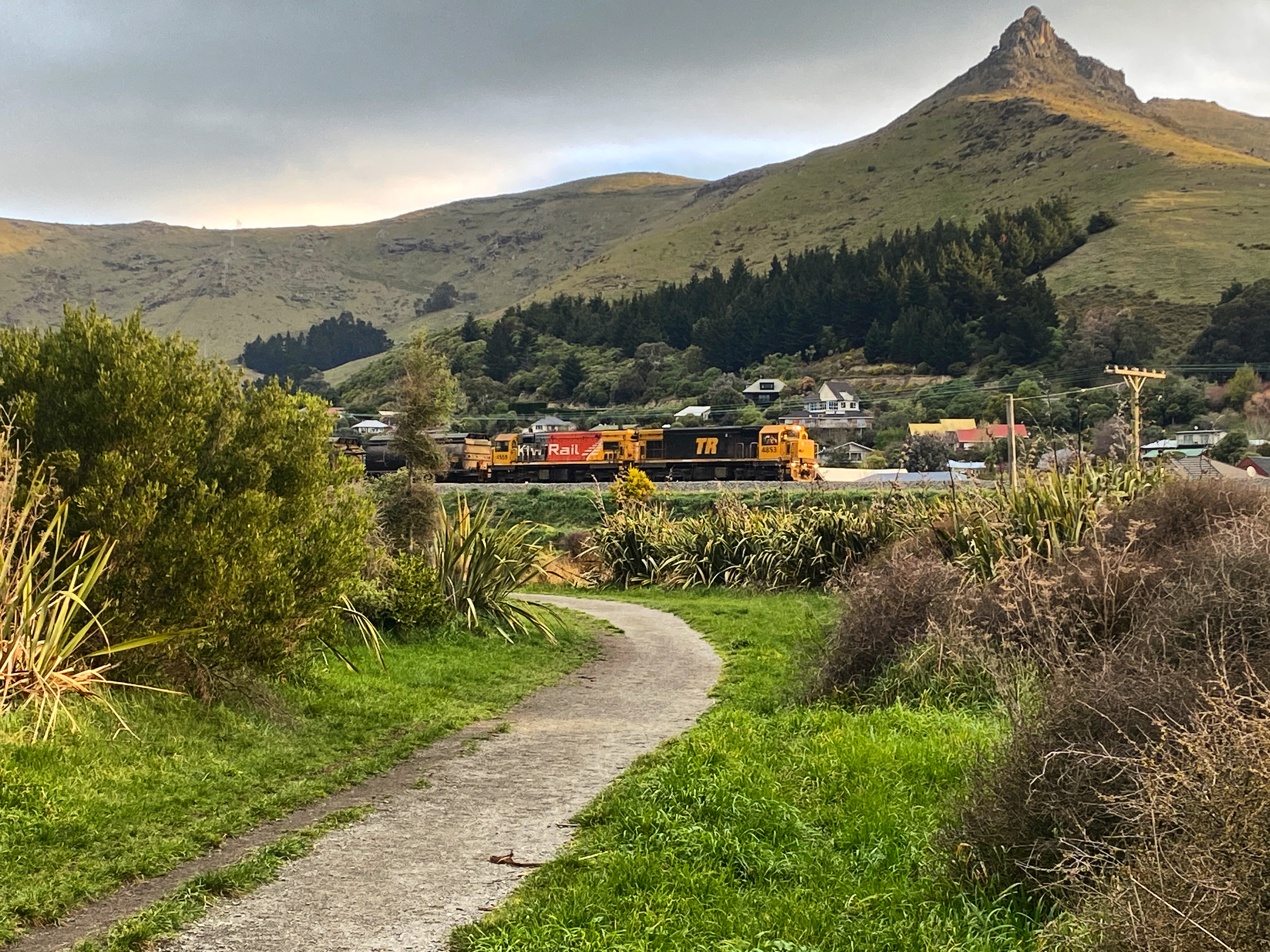
- Looking south from the Matuku Lakes towards the Port Hills

- Location within South Island
- Location: Heathcote Valley, Christchurch, Canterbury Region, New Zealand
- Coordinates: 43.566°S 172.702°E
- Area: 76 hectares (190 acres)
- Established: 2018

Ferrymead Regional Park is a regional park in Christchurch, New Zealand, near the mouth of the Ōpāwaho / Heathcote River. The park is adjacent to Ferrymead Heritage Park, and the Ferrymead Railway runs through the eastern section of the park.

== Geography ==
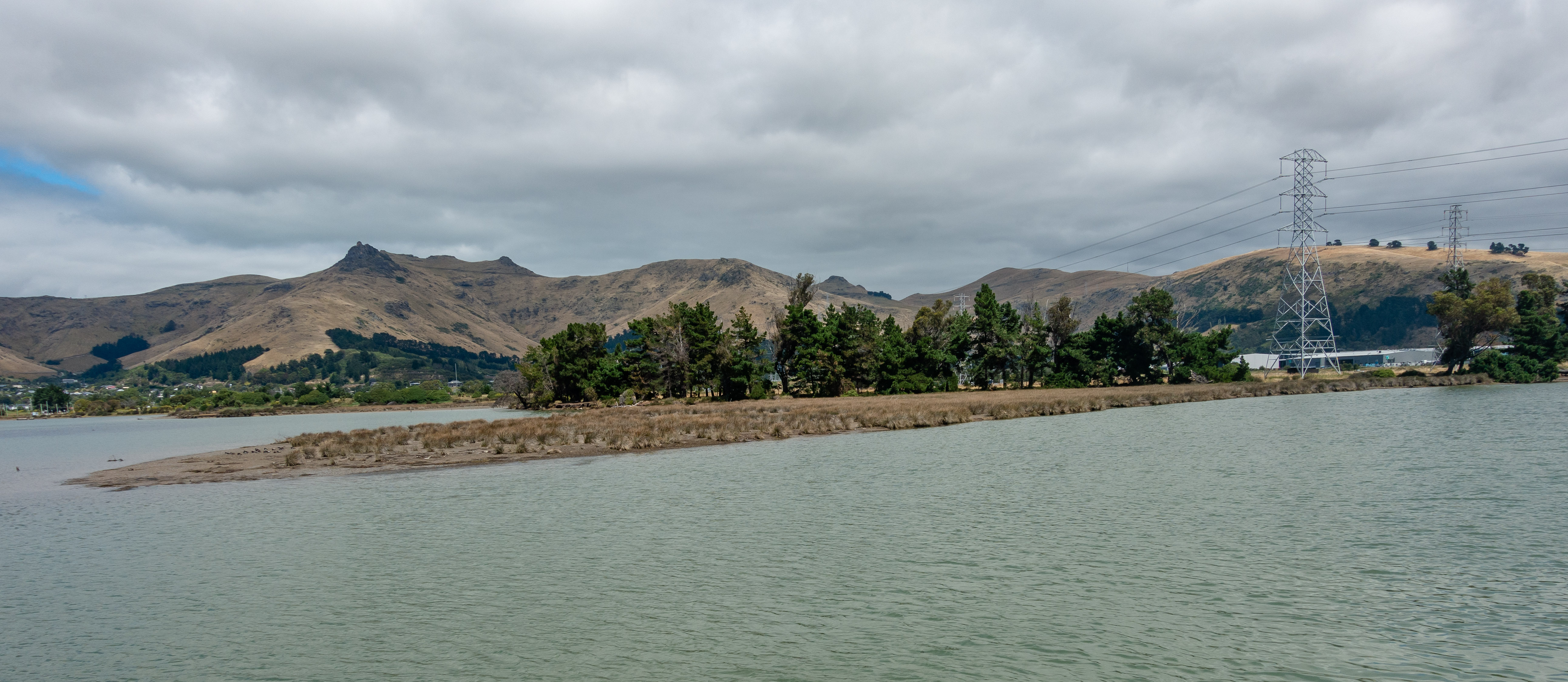
Much of the regional park is formed by regenerating saltmarshes on the southern banks of the Ōpāwaho / Heathcote River

Ferrymead Regional Park is located on the southern banks of the Ōpāwaho / Heathcote River, an area which features saltmarshes.

== Biodiversity ==
The Heathcote-Opawaho Lizard Sanctuary, a lizard sanctuary dedicated to protecting McCann's skink, is found in Ferrymead Regional Park.

== History ==
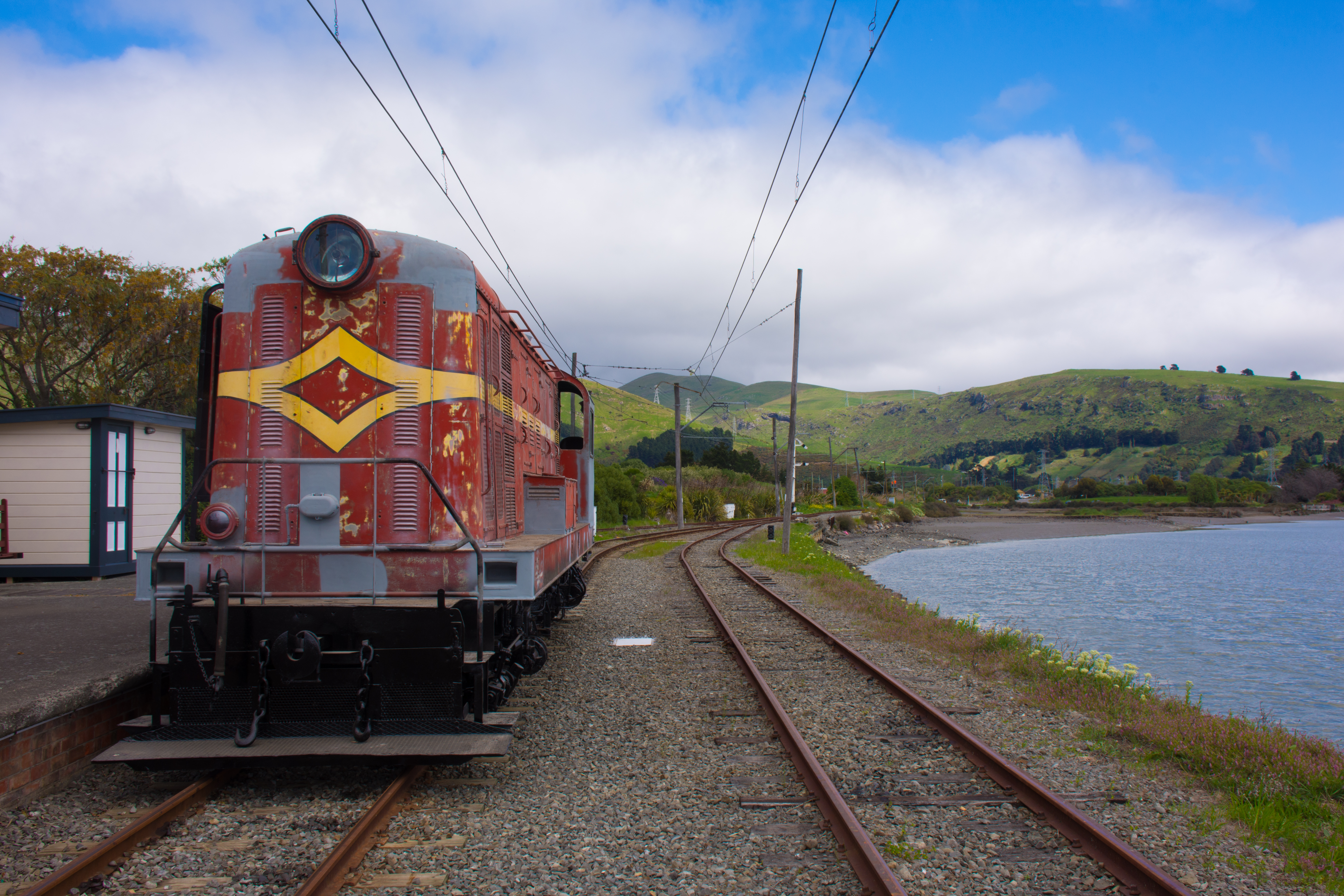
Sections of the Ferrymead Railway are found within the regional park

The wider area was a traditional Ngāi Tahu food resource, where eels, lampreys and shellfish were collected.

Ferrymead Regional Park was established in 2018. In 2024, work began on coastal wetlands habitat restoration in Ferrymead Regional Park, including the removal of pine trees. The coastal wetland redevelopment project with continue to be developed in stages until 2030.

== Recreation ==
The park includes sports fields and Ferrymead Golf Course. The park includes two walking tracks, the Ōpāwaho River Track and Matuku Lakes Loop Track. Portions of the Ferrymead Railway are found within Ferrymead Regional Park.
