= FC Twenty 11 =

- Full name: FC Twenty 11
- Founded: 2011
- Ground: Avonhead Park, Christchurch
- League: Canterbury Championship
- 2026: Canterbury Championship, 3rd of 10
Home colours	Away colours

FC Twenty 11 is a New Zealand amateur football club based in the city of Christchurch. The club was formed in 2011 following the merger of Avon United and Burnside A.F.C. The club competes in the Canterbury Championship.

The club is based in the western part of Christchurch and draw most of their players from Avonhead, Riccarton, Burnside, Fendalton, Ilam, Bryndwr and Hornby. The club rooms are situated at Riccarton Domain on Yaldhurst Road.

== Honours ==
Men's First Team

- Canterbury Premiership League: 2022

Women's First Team

- Canterbury Women's Championship League: 2024

== Recent seasons ==
After narrowly missing out on Southern League promotion to Ferrymead Bays FC and Nomads United AFC in 2021, FC Twenty 11 clinched promotion in 2022 after winning the Mainland Premier League and defeating Dunedin club Roslyn-Wakari AFC in the playoffs.

In 2023, the club was due to be relegated after a last-placed finish in the Southern League, but earnt a reprieve due to the withdrawal of higher-placed Green Island FC. However, in 2024, it finished in last place again and was relegated back to the Mainland Premier League. In 2025, it was then relegated to the Canterbury Championship League, which it plays in today.

FC Twenty 11 has competed in the Chatham Cup since it's foundation in 2011, but has not progressed past the second round.
