= Waimakariri United AFC =

- Waimakariri United logo
- Full name: Waimakariri United Association Football Club
- Nickname: Waimak United
- Founded: 2008
- Ground: Kendall Park, Kaiapoi; Maria Andrews Park, Rangiora
- Manager: Harry Trewthowan (Senior men's), Mike De Bono (Senior women's)
- League: Canterbury Premiership
- 2026: Canterbury Premiership, 7th of 10
Home colours

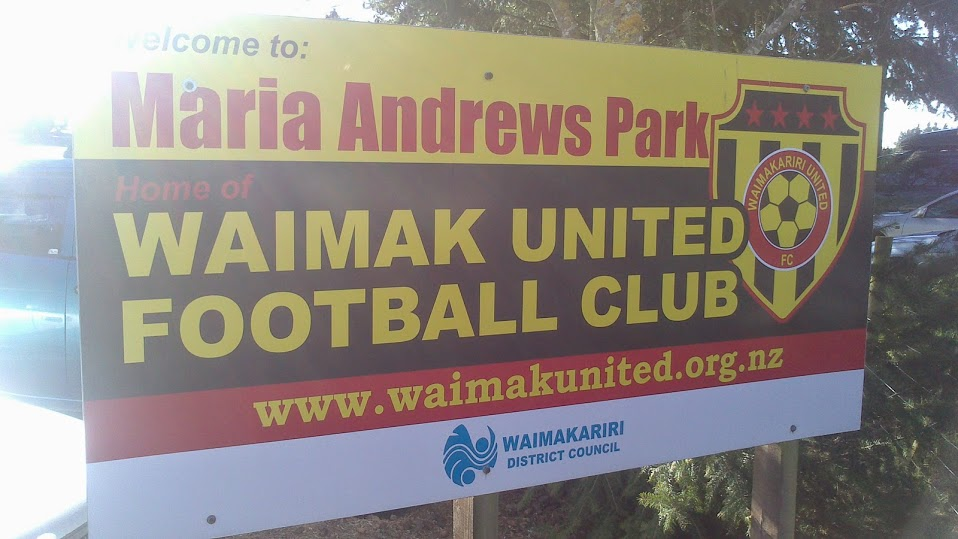
Welcome sign to Maria Andrews Park, one of the club's home pitches

Waimakariri United is a football club based in Rangiora, New Zealand. The club competes in the Canterbury Premiership. It was formed in 2008 through the merger of two North Canterbury teams, Kaiapoi Town (formerly based at Kendall Park, Kaiapoi) and Rangiora FC (formerly based at Maria Andrews Park, Rangiora).

== Honours ==
- Canterbury Premiership League: 2024
