= Halswell United AFC =

NZ football club, based in Christchurch, New Zealand

- Full name: Halswell United Association Football Club
- Nickname: The Hawks
- Founded: 1964; 62 years ago
- Ground: Halswell Domain, Halswell, Christchurch
- Chairman: (England) Craig Bowen
- Coach: (England) Ollie Hawkins
- League: Canterbury Premiership
- 2026: Canterbury Premiership, 2nd of 10
| Home colours | Away colours |

Halswell United is an amateur association football club based in Christchurch, New Zealand in the suburb of Halswell. The club competes in the Canterbury Premiership.

The club was founded in 1964 as Halswell United Soccer, changing its name in 1999 when the national body officially changed its title to include the word football, and it is one of the largest clubs in the South Island, with over 900 members.

== History ==
The club was formed in March and April 1964, with meetings at the Halswell Scouts Hall, which were on the site now occupied by the club's rooms. Initial teams were age-group teams (under-9 and under-13 boys). A senior team was soon added. By the second season, the club were granted the right to use Halswell Domain as its home ground. Drainage at the ground was poor, leading to several games being washed out. Building of clubrooms began in 1965; they were extended in 1968. In 1967 the club entered the Canterbury Football Association's competitions for the first time, competing in Division 3B (which they won in their inaugural season). This was followed by promotion to Division One in 1969.

New clubrooms were constructed starting in 1976, and work was completed on them in various stages over the following years, being finally finished in 1988.

Club colours were originally white, with a green hoop added in the club's second season. This strip now forms the basis of the club's away strip. Shorts became green from 1968, and shirts were changed to green and white stripes at the same time.

== Honours and achievements ==
Halswell United have strong teams at senior level in both men's and women's football. The women's team has reached the semi-finals of the national knockout cup competition. The men's side reached the quarter-finals of the Chatham Cup in 2002, going one stage further to reach the last four in 2005.

Halswell united competed in the Southern Regional league of the Superclub competition, its best final position being fourth in the 1993 competition.

The club won the Mainland Premier League in 2003 and 2004, and the Canterbury Championship League in 2020.

Prominent Halswell players have included Aaran Lines.
