= 2026 New Zealand National League =

Football championship

New Zealand National League
- Season: 2026
- Dates: 21 March – 13 December
- Matches: 30
- Goals: 97 (3.23 per match)
- Top goalscorer: Garbhan Coughlan (10 goals)
- Biggest home win: Cashmere Technical 10–0 Wellington Phoenix Reserves (4 Oct)
- Biggest away win: Auckland FC Reserves 1–6 Birkenhead United (25 Oct)
- Highest scoring: Cashmere Technical 10–0 Wellington Phoenix Reserves (4 Oct)
- Longest winning run: 4 matches (active); Birkenhead United
- Longest unbeaten run: 5 matches (active); Auckland City
- Longest winless run: 6 matches (active); Auckland FC Reserves
- Longest losing run: 4 matches (active); Ferrymead Bays
- All statistics correct as of 1 November.

The 2026 New Zealand Men's National League (known as the Dettol Men's National League for sponsorship reasons) is the sixth scheduled season of the National League since its restructuring in 2021; the 2021 National League was cancelled due to the COVID-19 pandemic in northern regions. 32 clubs compete in the competition, with four qualifying from the Northern League, three qualifying from the Central League and two qualifying from the Southern League for the National Championship phase. Auckland FC Reserves and Wellington Phoenix Reserves qualify automatically for the championship phase. Each team can field a maximum of four foreign players as well as one additional foreign player who has Oceania Football Confederation nationality.

The qualifying league fixtures were announced on 24 February 2026. The Northern League and Southern League started on 21 March 2026 and the Central League started on 28 March. The Northern and Central leagues will conclude on 29 August 2026 with the Southern League concluding on 30 August 2026. The fixtures for the championship phase were announced on 9 September 2026.

== Qualifying leagues ==
=== 2026 Northern League ===
Northern League
- Season: 2026
- Dates: 21 March – 29 August
- Champions: Birkenhead United
- Promoted: Auckland City; Auckland FC Reserves; Auckland United; Birkenhead United; Eastern Suburbs; Western Springs
- Matches: 132
- Goals: 448 (3.39 per match)
- Top goalscorer: Monty Patterson (12 goals)
- Biggest home win: Eastern Suburbs 7–0 Manukau United (18 July)
- Biggest away win: Western Springs 0–6 Fencibles United (23 May); Manukau United 0–6 Auckland United (1 August)
- Highest scoring: Fencibles United 7–1 Melville United (3 April); Tauranga City 7–1 Manukau United; 29 August)

==== Northern League teams ====
Twelve teams are competing in the league – the top ten teams from the previous season and the two teams promoted from the NRFL Championship. The promoted teams are Manukau United and Melville United. Manukau United return after a two-year absence, while Melville United return after one. They replaced Manurewa and West Coast Rangers (both relegated after a three-year Northern League spell).

Team	Home ground	Location	2025 season
Auckland City	Kiwitea Street	Sandringham, Auckland	4th
Auckland FC Reserves	Fred Taylor Park	Whenuapai, Auckland	9th
Auckland United	Keith Hay Park	Mount Roskill, Auckland	3rd
Bay Olympic	Olympic Park	New Lynn, Auckland	8th
Birkenhead United	Shepherds Park	Beach Haven, Auckland	2nd
East Coast Bays	Bay City Park	Northcross, Auckland	6th
Eastern Suburbs	Madills Farm	Kohimarama, Auckland	5th
Fencibles United	Riverhills Domain	Pakuranga, Auckland	10th
Manukau United	Centre Park	Māngere East, Auckland	1st in Championship (promoted)
Melville United	Gower Park	Melville, Hamilton	2nd in Championship (promoted)
Tauranga City	Links Avenue Reserve	Mount Maunganui	7th
Western Springs	Seddon Fields	Westmere, Auckland	1st

==== Northern League personnel ====
Team	Manager	Captain
Auckland City	(Czech Republic) Rudy Mozr	(New Zealand) Mario Ilich
Auckland FC Reserves	(New Zealand) Rory Fallon	(New Zealand) James Mitchell
Auckland United	(United States) Ben Sippola	(New Zealand) Ross Haviland
Bay Olympic	(New Zealand) Chris Milicich (interim)	(New Zealand) Callum McNeill
Birkenhead United	(England) Paul Hobson	(New Zealand) Dino Botica
East Coast Bays	(New Zealand) Joe Hall	(New Zealand) Louie Caunter
Eastern Suburbs	(New Zealand) Michael Built	(New Zealand) Jake Mechell
Fencibles United	(New Zealand) Rhys Ruka	(New Zealand) Jake Moosbally
Manukau United	(Fiji) Mohammed Asif Khan	
Melville United	(New Zealand) Aaron Scott (England) Harry Trethowan	
Tauranga City	(Scotland) Barry Gardiner	(New Zealand) Campbell Higgins
Western Springs	(England) Scott Hales	(Samoa) Niko Steinmetz

==== Northern League managerial changes ====
Team	Outgoing manager	Manner of departure	Date of vacancy	Position in the table	Incoming manager	Date of appointment
Melville United	(New Zealand) Jarrod Young	Stepped down	30 August 2025	Preseason	(New Zealand) Aaron Scott (England) Harry Trethowan	24 November 2025
Auckland FC Reserves	(Australia) Luke Casserly	Promoted to OFC Pro League team	1 December 2025	Preseason	(New Zealand) Rory Fallon	29 January 2026
Auckland United	(England) José Figueira	Stepped down	12 December 2025	Preseason	(United States) Ben Sippola	21 December 2025
Auckland City	(New Zealand) Paul Posa	Stepped down	15 December 2025	Preseason	(Czech Republic) Rudy Mozr	16 December 2025
Bay Olympic	(New Zealand) Peter Smith	Stepped down	21 June 2026	11th	(New Zealand) Chris Milicich (interim)	21 June 2026

==== Northern League table ====
Pos	Team	Pld	W	D	L	GF	GA	GD	Pts	Qualification
1	Birkenhead United (C, P)	22	18	4	0	58	13	+45	58	Winner of Northern League, qualification to National League Championship and promoted to National League via ranking
2	Eastern Suburbs (P)	22	14	5	3	41	9	+32	47	Qualification to National League Championship and promoted to National League via ranking
3	Auckland City (P)	22	14	3	5	51	19	+32	45	Qualification to National League Championship and promoted to National League via ranking
4	Auckland United (P)	22	12	5	5	47	21	+26	41	Qualification to National League Championship and promoted to National League via ranking
5	Fencibles United	22	13	2	7	55	36	+19	41	
6	East Coast Bays	22	10	5	7	34	35	−1	35	
7	Auckland FC Reserves (Note: Auckland FC Reserves gain automatic entry into the National League Championship phase and cannot be relegated due to the A-League Men requirements.) (P)	22	8	3	11	38	40	−2	27	Qualification to National League Championship and promoted to National League via ranking
8	Western Springs (O, P)	22	7	3	12	33	40	−7	24	Qualification to 2027 National League play-offs via ranking
9	Melville United	22	6	2	14	24	48	−24	20	
10	Bay Olympic	22	4	4	14	23	56	−33	16	
11	Tauranga City	22	4	3	15	29	52	−23	15	
12	Manukau United	22	2	1	19	14	78	−64	7	

Source: NRF
Rules for classification: 1) Points; 2) Goal difference; 3) Goals scored; 4) Goals against; 5) Head to head; 6) Disciplinary record; 7) Coin toss
(C) Champions; (O) Play-off winners; (P) Promoted

==== Northern League results table ====
Home \ Away	AKC	AFC	AKU	BAY	BIR	ECB	EAS	FEN	MAN	MEL	TGA	WSP
Auckland City	—	2–0	1–1	5–1	0–1	1–0	0–1	4–1	4–2	4–0	3–2	3–0
Auckland FC Reserves	1–3	—	2–0	4–1	0–2 (Note: Match was played at Birkenhead United's home ground of Shepherds Park on 6 June 2026.)	2–0	0–1	1–2	3–2	3–2	3–3	0–1
Auckland United	1–0	3–3	—	3–1	0–2	3–0	1–0	1–1	7–0	3–0	3–0	0–0
Bay Olympic	1–4	4–3	0–3	—	2–2	0–1	1–5	1–2	1–0	0–2	1–0	3–4
Birkenhead United	3–2	2–0	4–0	6–0	—	3–1	2–1	0–0	6–1	4–1	2–0	3–0
East Coast Bays	4–3	2–1	0–4	2–2	2–2	—	1–0	4–2	3–0	0–2	2–1	2–2
Eastern Suburbs	0–0	3–0	0–0	2–0	1–1	1–1	—	4–1	7–0	4–0	3–0	1–0
Fencibles United	0–3	3–2	4–1	2–0	0–1	3–2	0–1	—	4–0	7–1	7–1	3–1
Manukau United	0–5	1–2	0–6	1–1	1–5	0–2	0–3	1–2	—	0–1	3–2	1–0
Melville United	0–1	1–5	1–4	1–1	0–2	0–1	1–1	2–3	2–0	—	0–1	1–3
Tauranga City	0–0	1–2	0–3	1–2	0–3	0–0	0–1	5–2	7–1	1–4	—	4–2
Western Springs	0–3	1–1	2–0	3–0	1–2	3–4	0–1	0–6	5–0	0–2	5–0	—

Source: Soccerway
Legend: Blue = home team win; Yellow = draw; Red = away team win.

==== Northern League scoring ====
===== Northern League top scorers =====
Rank	Player	Club	Goals
1	(New Zealand) Monty Patterson	Birkenhead United	12
2	(Argentina) Héctor Echagüe	Eastern Suburbs	11
2	(New Zealand) Ben Wallace	Western Springs / Auckland United	11
2	(Lithuania) Marius Zabarauskas	East Coast Bays	11
5	(New Zealand) Luke Flowerdew	Auckland United / East Coast Bays	10
5	(New Zealand) Harley Hill	Auckland FC Reserves	10
5	(New Zealand) Angus Kilkolly	Auckland City	10
5	(New Zealand) Josh Redfearn	Birkenhead United	10
9	(New Zealand) Charlie Hale	Auckland FC Reserves	9
9	(Chile) Ronaldo Muñoz	Fencibles United	9

===== Northern League hat-tricks =====
Round	Player	For	Against	Home/Away	Result	Date
3	(Cook Islands) Ryan Clarke	Fencibles United	Melville United	Home	7–1	3 April 2026
7	(New Zealand) Dylan Manickum	Auckland City	Fencibles United	Home	4–1	25 April 2026
7 (Note: Match was postponed and played between rounds 15 and 16.)	(New Zealand) Harley Hill	Auckland FC Reserves	Bay Olympic	Home	4–1	4 July 2026
16	(Czech Republic) Pavel Osmančík	Auckland City	Manukau United	Away	0–5	11 July 2026
19 (Note: Match was brough forward and played between rounds 17 and 18.)	(New Zealand) Ryan de Vries (Note: Player scored 4 goals)	Auckland City	Bay Olympic	Home	5–1	29 July 2026
20	(New Zealand) Charlie Hale	Auckland FC Reserves	Melville United	Away	1–5	15 August 2026

==== Clean sheets ====
Rank	Player	Club	Clean sheets
1	(Cook Islands) Ngereine Maro	Auckland United	12
2	(New Zealand) Jack de Groot	Eastern Suburbs	11
3	(New Zealand) Oli Pocock	Eastern Suburbs / Birkenhead United	7
4	(England) Louie Caunter	East Coast Bays	6
5	(New Zealand) Nathan Garrow	Auckland City	5
5	(New Zealand) Keegan Smith	Birkenhead United	5
5	(New Zealand) Max Tommy	Melville United	5
8	(Japan) Sota Yuasa	Fencibles United	4
9	(Cook Islands) Emmett Connolly	Western Springs	3
9	(New Zealand) Matthew Foord	Auckland City	3

=== 2026 Central League ===
Central League
- Season: 2026
- Dates: 28 March – 29 August
- Champions: Napier City Rovers
- Promoted: Miramar Rangers; Napier City Rovers; Wellington Olympic; Wellington Phoenix Reserves
- Matches: 90
- Goals: 304 (3.38 per match)
- Top goalscorer: Martín Bueno and Kyle Carr (10 goals each)
- Biggest home win: Miramar Rangers 12–0 FC Western (8 August)
- Biggest away win: Island Bay United 0–6 Western Suburbs (18 April); Waterside Karori 0–6 Miramar Rangers (2 May); FC Western 0–6 Napier City Rovers (29 August)
- Highest scoring: Miramar Rangers 12–0 FC Western (8 August)

==== Central League teams ====
Ten teams are competing in the league – the top nine teams from the previous season and the one team promoted from the 2025 Central League 2. The promoted team is FC Western. This is their first season in the Central League, since New Zealand football's restructuring in 2021. They replaced North Wellington (relegated after a five-year Central League spell).

Team	Home ground	Location	2025 season
FC Western	Lynmouth Park	Lynmouth, New Plymouth	1st in Central League 2 (promoted)
Island Bay United	Wakefield Park	Island Bay, Wellington	6th
Miramar Rangers	David Farrington Park	Miramar, Wellington	2nd
Napier City Rovers	Bluewater Stadium	Napier	5th
Petone	Memorial Park	Petone, Lower Hutt	9th
Upper Hutt City	Maidstone Park	Maidstone, Upper Hutt	8th
Waterside Karori	Karori Park	Karori, Wellington	7th
Wellington Olympic	Wakefield Park	Island Bay, Wellington	1st
Wellington Phoenix Reserves	Fraser Park	Taitā, Lower Hutt	4th
Western Suburbs	Endeavour Park	Porirua	3rd

==== Central League personnel ====
Team	Manager	Captain
FC Western	(England) Josh Dobson	(New Zealand) Benjamin Furze
Island Bay United	(New Zealand) Callum Holmes	(Argentina) Leonardo Villa
Miramar Rangers	(England) Jamie O’Connor	(New Zealand) Andy Bevin
Napier City Rovers	(England) Bill Robertson	(England) Jim Hoyle
Petone	(New Zealand) Sam Pickering	(New Zealand) Oliver Pickering
Upper Hutt City	(New Zealand) Toby Wilton	(New Zealand) Donal Gahan
Waterside Karori	(Chile) Tomás Godoy Fouquet	(Argentina) Tomás Alvarado
Wellington Olympic	(New Zealand) Ekow Quainoo	(Cook Islands) Ben Mata
Wellington Phoenix Reserves	(New Zealand) Joshua Neff	(New Zealand) Dylan Gardiner
Western Suburbs	(New Zealand) Matthew Calvert	(Tonga) Alifeleti Peini

==== Central League managerial changes ====
Team	Outgoing manager	Manner of departure	Date of vacancy	Position in the table	Incoming manager	Date of appointment
Island Bay United	(Argentina) Martín Pereyra-García	End of contract	30 August 2025	Pre-season	(New Zealand) Callum Holmes	21 October 2025
Petone	(England) Jamie O’Connor	Stepped down	21 October 2025	Pre-season	(New Zealand) Sam Pickering	28 October 2025
Miramar Rangers	(New Zealand) Kale Herbert	Stepped down	6 December 2025	Pre-season	(England) Jamie O’Connor	14 December 2025
Wellington Olympic	(Barbados) Paul Ifill	Stepped down	13 December 2025	Pre-season	(New Zealand) Ekow Quainoo	24 December 2025
Upper Hutt City	(New Zealand) Rory Fallon	Stepped down	19 December 2025	Pre-season	(New Zealand) Toby Wilton	6 February 2026
Wellington Phoenix Reserves	(England) Chris Greenacre	Promoted to senior Wellington Phoenix team	22 February 2026	Pre-season	(United States) Joshua Neff	February 2026 (interim); 2 June 2026 (fulltime)

==== Central League table ====
Pos	Team	Pld	W	D	L	GF	GA	GD	Pts	Qualification
1	Napier City Rovers (C, P)	18	14	2	2	52	15	+37	44	Winner of Central League, qualification to National League Championship and promoted to National League via ranking
2	Wellington Olympic (P)	18	13	3	2	53	17	+36	42	Qualification to National League Championship and promoted to National League via ranking
3	Miramar Rangers (P)	18	12	5	1	47	14	+33	41	Qualification to National League Championship and promoted to National League via ranking
4	Western Suburbs	18	10	6	2	33	14	+19	36	Qualification to 2027 National League play-offs via ranking
5	Upper Hutt City	18	8	0	10	32	37	−5	24	
6	Island Bay United	18	7	1	10	28	37	−9	22	
7	Waterside Karori	18	4	3	11	16	43	−27	15	
8	Petone	18	3	4	11	16	32	−16	13	
9	Wellington Phoenix Reserves (Note: Wellington Phoenix Reserves gain automatic entry into the National League Championship phase and cannot be relegated due to the A-League Men requirements.) (P)	18	2	5	11	17	26	−9	11	Qualification to National League Championship and promoted to National League via ranking
10	FC Western	18	1	3	14	10	69	−59	6	

Source: Capital Football
Rules for classification: 1) Points; 2) Goal difference; 3) Goals scored; 4) Goals against; 5) Head to head; 6) Disciplinary record; 7) Coin toss
(C) Champions; (P) Promoted

==== Central League results table ====
Home \ Away	FCW	IBU	MRA	NCR	PET	UHC	WKA	WOP	WPX	WES
FC Western	—	0–5	1–3	0–6	1–2	1–4	2–3	0–4	2–1	1–1
Island Bay United	0–0	—	0–2	0–1	2–0	4–2	4–0	1–2	2–1	0–6
Miramar Rangers	12–0	4–2	—	2–1	4–1	2–0	0–0	1–1	1–0	1–1
Napier City Rovers	6–1	3–0	2–3	—	4–0	5–1	5–0	3–2	2–1	0–0
Petone	5–0	1–2	1–1	0–1	—	0–2	2–1	1–1	1–1	0–2
Upper Hutt City	3–0	1–4	2–3	0–2	2–0	—	6–0	1–6	1–0	1–2
Waterside Karori	1–0	4–0	0–6	1–3	1–0	1–2	—	0–3	1–3	2–2
Wellington Olympic	9–0	5–1	1–1	0–3	5–1	4–1	2–1	—	3–1	2–1
Wellington Phoenix Reserves	1–1	3–1	0–1	1–2	1–1	1–2	0–0	0–2	—	2–2
Western Suburbs	3–0	2–0	1–0	3–3	1–0	2–1	3–0	0–1	1–0	—

Source: Soccerway
Legend: Blue = home team win; Yellow = draw; Red = away team win.

==== Central League scoring ====
As of 12 September 2026

===== Central League top scorers =====
Rank	Player	Club	Goals
1	(Uruguay) Martín Bueno	Miramar Rangers	11
1	(United States) Kyle Carr	Western Suburbs	11
3	(New Zealand) Lucas Hansen	Upper Hutt City	10
4	(New Zealand) Benjamin Stanley	Napier City Rovers	9
5	(England) Connor Gaul	Miramar Rangers	8
5	(New Zealand) Rio Winkworth	Upper Hutt City	8
7	(New Zealand) Luke Stoupe	Wellington Olympic	7
8	(New Zealand) Timothy O'Farrell	Island Bay United	6
8	(New Zealand) Tsar Mitchener	Island Bay United	6
8	(England) Callum Cooke	Napier City Rovers	6
8	(England) Jacob Fenton	Napier City Rovers	6
8	(New Zealand) Donal Gahan	Upper Hutt City	6
8	(New Zealand) Sebastian Barton-Ginger	Wellington Olympic	6
8	(New Zealand) Gianni Bouzoukis	Wellington Olympic	6

=== 2026 Southern League ===
Southern League
- Season: 2026
- Dates: 21 March – 12 September
- Champions: Cashmere Technical
- Promoted: Cashmere Technical; Coastal Spirit
- Matches: 90
- Goals: 355 (3.94 per match)
- Top goalscorer: Garbhan Coughlan (32 goals)
- Biggest home win: Nelson Suburbs 11–0 Northern (12 July); Cashmere Technical 11–0 Wānaka (12 September)
- Biggest away win: Wānaka 0–9 Cashmere Technical (11 April)
- Highest scoring: Nelson Suburbs 11–0 Northern (12 July); Cashmere Technical 11–0 Wānaka (12 September)

The 2026 Southern League is the 5th season of a full 10 team league, 6th season since the restructure of the leagues, of a South Island wide football league. The League starts in March and finishes in September, with the top two side qualifying for the National League Championship.

==== Southern League teams ====
Ten teams are competing in the league – the top nine teams from the previous season and the winner of the Southern League play-offs. The promoted team is Northern. This is their first season in the Southern League. They replaced University of Canterbury (relegated after two seasons in the Southern League).

On 12 February, Selwyn United announced that "we have been offered, and have accepted, a place in the Southern League for the upcoming season following a vacancy in the competition". On 24 February 2026, this was confirmed as New Zealand Football released the fixtures.

Team	Home ground	Location	2025 season
Cashmere Technical	Garrick Memorial Park	Woolston, Christchurch	3rd
Christchurch United	United Sports Centre	Spreydon, Christchurch	2nd
Coastal Spirit	Tāne Norton Park	Linwood, Christchurch	1st
Dunedin City Royals	Tahuna Park	Tainui, Dunedin	7th
Ferrymead Bays	Ferrymead Park	Ferrymead, Christchurch	6th
Nelson Suburbs	Saxton Field	Stoke, Nelson	4th
Nomads United	Tulett Park	Casebrook, Christchurch	5th
Northern	Caledonian Ground	Dunedin North, Dunedin	1st in Southern Premiership League (promoted via play-offs)
Selwyn United	Foster Park	Rolleston	10th (Note: Selwyn United were reprieved of relegation as University of Canterbury withdrew.)
Wānaka	Wānaka Recreation Centre	Wānaka	8th

==== Southern League personnel ====
Team	Manager	Captain
Cashmere Technical	(England) Daniel Schwarz	(England) Tom Schwarz
Christchurch United	(New Zealand) Daniel Godden	(New Zealand) Ben Stroud
Coastal Spirit	(New Zealand) Robert Stanton	(New Zealand) Weston Bell
Dunedin City Royals	(New Zealand) Blair Scoullar	(New Zealand) Max Davidson
Ferrymead Bays	(New Zealand) Alan Walker	(New Zealand) Luke Pritchard
Nelson Suburbs	(Northern Ireland) Ryan Stewart	(England) Lennon Whewell
Nomads United	(New Zealand) Matthew Jansen	(New Zealand) Jacob Anderson
Northern	(New Zealand) Arran Wilkinson	(New Zealand) Luka Mandich
Selwyn United	(New Zealand) John Morgan (interim)	(New Zealand) Liam Coleman
Wānaka	(Sweden) Max Uhr	(New Zealand) Danny Heemskerk

==== Southern League managerial changes ====
Team	Outgoing manager	Manner of departure	Date of vacancy	Position in the table	Incoming manager	Date of appointment
Christchurch United	(New Zealand) Ryan Edwards	New job with South Island United	29 November 2025	Pre-season	(Spain) Albert Riera	13 November 2025
Wānaka	(United States) Ben Sippola	Signed by Auckland United	21 December 2025	Pre-season	(Netherlands) Thomas van Hees	24 March 2026
Wānaka	(Netherlands) Thomas van Hees	Stepped down	Unknown	Unknown	(Sweden) Max Uhr	Unknown
Selwyn United	(New Zealand) Christopher Brown	Signed by Wellington Phoenix	18 July 2026	9th	(New Zealand) John Morgan (interim)	20 July 2026
Christchurch United	(Spain) Albert Riera	Resigned	9 August 2026	7th	(New Zealand) Daniel Godden	9 August 2026

==== Southern League table ====
Pos	Team	Pld	W	D	L	GF	GA	GD	Pts	Qualification
1	Cashmere Technical (C, P)	18	17	1	0	91	7	+84	52	Winner of Southern League, qualification to National League Championship and promoted to National League via ranking
2	Ferrymead Bays	18	12	2	4	39	19	+20	38	Qualification to National League Championship
3	Nomads United	18	11	3	4	42	24	+18	36	
4	Coastal Spirit (P)	18	11	1	6	45	36	+9	34	Promoted to National League via ranking
5	Nelson Suburbs	18	8	1	9	50	42	+8	25	
6	Northern	18	7	2	9	22	38	−16	23	
7	Christchurch United	18	5	5	8	24	26	−2	20	Qualification to 2027 National League play-offs via ranking
8	Dunedin City Royals	18	5	1	12	15	41	−26	16	
9	Wānaka	18	3	1	14	18	73	−55	10	
10	Selwyn United	18	2	1	15	18	58	−40	7	

Source: Mainland Football
Rules for classification: 1) Points; 2) Goal difference; 3) Goals scored; 4) Goals against; 5) Head to head; 6) Disciplinary record; 7) Coin toss
(C) Champions; (P) Promoted

==== Southern League results table ====
Home \ Away	CAS	CHU	CSP	DCR	FMB	NEL	NOM	NOR	SEL	WĀN
Cashmere Technical	—	2–0	5–1	3–0	4–0	6–0	2–2	6–0	5–1	11–0
Christchurch United	0–5	—	0–2	0–1	0–0	1–3	3–0	1–1	4–1	4–2
Coastal Spirit	1–5	2–1	—	2–0	1–2	3–5	1–0	5–0	2–1	4–2
Dunedin City Royals	0–6	2–0	3–3	—	0–3	1–4	0–2	1–0	2–1	2–1
Ferrymead Bays	0–5	1–0	6–0	2–1	—	5–0	1–2	1–0	3–0	5–0
Nelson Suburbs	0–6	3–3	0–1	4–1	2–3	—	1–4	11–0	6–0	6–0
Nomads United	1–4	0–0	3–2	2–0	1–1	2–1	—	2–0	8–1	6–1
Northern	0–3	0–2	1–2	4–0	2–0	2–1	3–0	—	3–1	2–0
Selwyn United	1–4	1–1	0–5	2–0	0–2	1–2	3–5	1–3	—	2–1
Wānaka	0–9	0–4	2–8	2–1	1–4	3–1	0–2	1–1	2–1	—

Source: Soccerway
Legend: Blue = home team win; Yellow = draw; Red = away team win.

==== Southern League scoring ====
As of 12 September 2026

===== Southern League top scorers =====
Rank	Player	Club	Goals
1	(Republic of Ireland) Garbhan Coughlan	Cashmere Technical	32
2	(New Zealand) Rory Hibbert	Cashmere Technical	15
3	(New Zealand) Omar Cameron	Ferrymead Bays	14
4	(New Zealand) Zander Edwards	Cashmere Technical	13
5	(United States) John Reynolds	Nelson Suburbs	11
5	(England) Lennon Whewell	Nelson Suburbs	11
7	(New Zealand) Ben Polak	Nelson Suburbs	9
8	(New Zealand) Flynn Holdem	Nomads United	8
8	(New Zealand) Max Chrétien	Coastal Spirit	8
10	(New Zealand) Lyle Matthysen	Cashmere Technical	7

== 2027 National League play-offs ==
The 2027 New Zealand National League play-offs will take place in September 2026. The play-offs will confirm the final team to be promoted into the new look National League.

Pos	Team	Pld	W	D	L	GF	GA	GD	Pts	Promotion
1	Western Springs (P)	2	1	1	0	3	1	+2	4	Promotion to 2027 New Zealand National League
2	Christchurch United	2	1	0	1	3	2	+1	3	
3	Western Suburbs	2	0	1	1	1	4	−3	1	

Source: New Zealand Football
Rules for classification: 1) Points; 2) Goal difference; 3) Goals scored; 4) Goals against; 5) Head to head; 6) Disciplinary record; 7) Coin toss
(P) Promoted

=== Matches ===
6 September 2026
14:00 NZST

Christchurch United	3–0	Western Suburbs
Boyers 45'; Stevens 72'; Stearn 90+1'	Report

United Sports Centre, Christchurch
Referee: Campbell-Kirk Kawana-Waugh
12 September 2026
13:00 NZST

Western Suburbs	1–1	Western Springs
Ito 19'	Report	Carter 30'

Alex Moore Park, Wellington
Referee: Ben O'Connell
19 September 2026
13:00 NZST

Western Springs	2–0	Christchurch United
Cooper 28'; Manuel 69'	Report

Seddon Fields, Auckland
Referee: Cory Mills

== Qualified clubs ==
There are 11 men's National League Championship qualifying spots (4 plus Auckland FC Reserves for the Northern League, 3 plus Wellington Phoenix Reserves for the Central League and 2 for the Southern League).

Location of clubs in New Zealand for the 2026 National League season
Location of clubs in Auckland Region for the 2026 National League season
Location of clubs in Wellington Region for the 2026 National League season
Location of clubs in Christchurch district for the 2026 National League season

Association	Team	Position in Regional League	App (last)	Previous best (last)
Northern League (4 berths)	Birkenhead United	1st	4th (2025)	1st (Note: Birkenhead finished first in the 2024 season, but lost the grand final.) (2024)
Northern League (4 berths)	Eastern Suburbs	2nd	3rd (2024)	4th (2023)
Northern League (4 berths)	Auckland City	3rd	5th (2025)	2nd (Note: Auckland City finished second in the 2022, 2024 & 2025 seasons, but won the grand final.) (2025)
Northern League (4 berths)	Auckland United	4th	4th (2025)	3rd (2022)
Central League (3 berths)	Napier City Rovers	1st	4th (2024)	4th (2024)
Central League (3 berths)	Wellington Olympic	2nd	5th (2025)	1st (Note: Wellington Olympic finished 1st in 2025, but lost the final) (2025)
Central League (3 berths)	Miramar Rangers	3rd	3rd (2025)	3rd (2025)
Southern League (2 berths)	Cashmere Technical	1st	4th (2024)	5th (2023)
Southern League (2 berths)	Ferrymead Bays	2nd	1st	Debut
Auckland FC (automatic berth)	Auckland FC Reserves	Automatic qualification	2nd (2025)	4th (2025)
Wellington Phoenix (automatic berth)	Wellington Phoenix Reserves	Automatic qualification	5th (2025)	5th (2024)

=== Location ===
Team	Home ground	Location	2025 season
Auckland City	Kiwitea Street	Sandringham, Auckland	1st
Auckland FC Reserves	Fred Taylor Park	Whenuapai, Auckland	4th
Auckland United	Keith Hay Park	Mount Roskill, Auckland	10th
Birkenhead United	Shepherds Park	Beach Haven, Auckland	6th
Cashmere Technical	Garrick Memorial Park	Woolston, Christchurch	—N/a
Eastern Suburbs	Madills Farm	Kohimarama, Auckland	—N/a
Ferrymead Bays	Ferrymead Park	Ferrymead,Christchurch	—N/a
Miramar Rangers	David Farrington Park	Miramar, Wellington	3rd
Napier City Rovers	Bluewater Stadium	Poraiti, Napier	—N/a
Wellington Olympic	Wakefield Park	Island Bay, Wellington	1st
Wellington Phoenix Reserves	Fraser Park	Taitā, Lower Hutt	9th

=== Personnel ===
Team	Manager	Captain
Auckland City	(Czech Republic) Rudy Mozr	(New Zealand) Mario Ilich
Auckland FC Reserves	(New Zealand) Rory Fallon	(New Zealand) James Mitchell
Auckland United	(United States) Ben Sippola	(New Zealand) Ross Haviland
Birkenhead United	(England) Paul Hobson	(New Zealand) Dino Botica
Cashmere Technical	(England) Daniel Schwarz	(England) Tom Schwarz
Eastern Suburbs	(New Zealand) Michael Built	(New Zealand) Jake Mechell
Ferrymead Bays	(New Zealand) Alan Walker	(New Zealand) Luke Pritchard
Miramar Rangers	(New Zealand) Kale Herbert	(New Zealand) Andy Bevin
Napier City Rovers	(England) Bill Robertson	(England) Jim Hoyle
Wellington Olympic	(New Zealand) Taylor Hall Jones	(Cook Islands) Ben Mata
Wellington Phoenix Reserves	(New Zealand) Joshua Neff	(New Zealand) Hayden Thomas

=== Managerial changes ===
Team	Outgoing manager	Manner of departure	Date of vacancy	Position in the table	Incoming manager	Date of appointment
Wellington Olympic	(New Zealand) Ekow Quainoo	Mutual Consent	8 October 2026	6th	(New Zealand) Taylor Hall Jones	10 October 2026
Miramar Rangers	(England) Jamie O'Connor	Resigned	14 November 2026	5th	(New Zealand) Kale Herbert	14 November 2026

== Championship phase ==
=== League table ===
Pos	Team	Pld	W	D	L	GF	GA	GD	Pts	Qualification
1	Cashmere Technical	9	5	1	3	24	6	+18	16	Qualification to Grand Final
2	Auckland City	8	4	4	0	22	9	+13	16	Qualification to Grand Final
3	Wellington Olympic	8	5	1	2	18	11	+7	16	
4	Miramar Rangers	8	5	1	2	15	9	+6	16	
5	Birkenhead United	8	4	1	3	14	11	+3	13	
6	Eastern Suburbs	8	3	2	3	10	15	−5	11	
7	Napier City Rovers	8	3	2	3	16	22	−6	11	
8	Ferrymead Bays	9	2	3	4	6	13	−7	9	
9	Auckland United	8	2	2	4	16	16	0	8	
10	Wellington Phoenix Reserves (Note: Auckland FC Reserves and Wellington Phoenix Reserves can not qualify for the Grand Final.)	8	1	3	4	7	20	−13	6	
11	Auckland FC Reserves	8	0	2	6	9	25	−16	2	

Updated to match(es) played on 22 November 2026. Source: New Zealand Football
Rules for classification: 1) Points; 2) Goal difference; 3) Goals for; 4) Goals against; 5) Head to head; 6) Disciplinary record

=== Results table ===
Home \ Away	AKC	AFC	AKU	BIR	CAS	EAS	FMB	MRA	NCR	WOP	WPX
Auckland City			3–0	2–2			6 Dec		7–1	2–2	
Auckland FC Reserves	29 Nov		2–2	1–6					1–6	2–3	
Auckland United				6 Dec		1–2	2–0	1–3	7–1		
Birkenhead United					0–4	1–2	2–0	29 Nov	2–0		
Cashmere Technical	1–1	3–0	29 Nov							3–0	10–0
Eastern Suburbs	2–4	6 Dec			2–0			1–4			1–1
Ferrymead Bays		0–0			0–2	0–0		1–4			1–0
Miramar Rangers	0–2	2–1			1–0					0–2	6 Dec
Napier City Rovers					2–1	29 Nov	2–2	1–1			3–1
Wellington Olympic			4–2	2–0		4–0	1–2		6 Dec		
Wellington Phoenix Reserves	1–1	3–2	1–1	0–1						28 Nov	

Updated to match(es) played on 22 November 2026. Source: New Zealand Football
Legend: Blue = home team win; Yellow = draw; Red = away team win.

==== Positions by round ====
The table lists the positions of teams after each week of matches. To preserve chronological evolvements, any postponed matches are not included in the round at which they were originally scheduled, but added to the full round they were played immediately afterwards. For example, if a match is scheduled for round 3, but then postponed and played between rounds 6 and 7, it is added to the standings for round 6.

Team ╲ Round	1	2	3	4	5	6	7	8	9	10	11
Cashmere Technical	1	1	2	1	1	1	1	1	1		
Auckland City	9	5	4	4	2	3	4	2	2		
Wellington Olympic	2	6	5	3	6	4	2	3	3		
Miramar Rangers	5	3	1	5	3	5	5	5	4		
Birkenhead United	11	11	8	6	4	2	3	4	5		
Eastern Suburbs	7	7	10	10	9	8	8	7	6		
Napier City Rovers	6	8	7	8	7	7	6	6	7		
Ferrymead Bays	8	4	6	7	8	9	9	9	8		
Auckland United	3	2	3	2	5	6	7	8	9		
Wellington Phoenix Reserves	4	9	11	11	11	10	10	10	10		
Auckland FC Reserves	10	10	9	9	10	11	11	11	11		

Leader and Grand Final
Grand Final

Updated to match(es) played on 22 November 2026. Source: New Zealand Football

== Statistics ==
As of 15 November 2026

=== Top scorers ===
Rank	Player	Club	Goals
1	(Republic of Ireland) Garbhan Coughlan	Cashmere Technical	11
2	(New Zealand) Will Mendoza	Auckland United	7
3	(Uruguay) Martín Bueno	Miramar Rangers	5
3	(New Zealand) Finn Caughey	Cashmere Technical	5
3	(New Zealand) Kian Donkers	Birkenhead United	5
6	(England) Callum Cooke	Napier City Rovers	4
6	(Argentina) Héctor Echagüe	Eastern Suburbs	4
6	(New Zealand) Charlie Hale	Auckland FC Reserves	4
6	(New Zealand) Harley Hill	Auckland FC Reserves	4
6	(New Zealand) Aston Hurd	Napier City Rovers	4
6	(New Zealand) Sam Lack	Napier City Rovers	4
6	(South Africa) Lyle Matthysen	Cashmere Technical	4

=== Hat-tricks ===
Round	Player	For	Against	Home/Away	Result	Date
2	(New Zealand) Will Mendoza (Note: Player scored 4 goals)	Auckland United	Napier City Rovers	Home	7–1	4 October 2026
2	(Republic of Ireland) Garbhan Coughlan	Cashmere Technical	Wellington Phoenix Reserves	Home	10–0	4 October 2026
5	(New Zealand) Kian Donkers	Birkenhead United	Auckland FC Reserves	Away	1–6	25 October 2026
5	(Uruguay) Martín Bueno	Miramar Rangers	Eastern Suburbs	Away	1–4	25 October 2026

=== Clean sheets ===
Rank	Player	Club	Clean sheets
1	(New Zealand) Pieter-Taco Bierema	Cashmere Technical	5
2	(New Zealand) Oliver Pocock	Birkenhead United	3
3	(New Zealand) Scott Basalaj	Wellington Olympic	2
3	(England) Louie Caunter	Auckland City	2
3	(New Zealand) Jack de Groot	Eastern Suburbs	2
3	(Wales) Evan Ovendale	Ferrymead Bays	2
7	(England) Freddie Martin	Auckland United	1

== Awards ==
=== Goal of the Week ===
Championship Phase

Goal of the Week
Week	Player	Club	Ref.
1	(New Zealand) Sam Lack	Napier City Rovers	
2	(New Zealand) Will Mendoza (Note: Will Mendoza's both goals won the award)	Auckland United	
3	(England) Callum Cooke	Napier City Rovers	

=== Player of the Week ===
Player of the Week
Week	Player	Club	Ref.
1	(Republic of Ireland) Garbhan Coughlan	Cashmere Technical	
2	(New Zealand) Will Mendoza	Auckland United	
3	(New Zealand) Owen Smith	Miramar Rangers	
4	(Republic of Ireland) Garbhan Coughlan	Cashmere Technical	

=== Annual awards ===
League	MVP	Club	Top scorer	Club
Northern League	(New Zealand) Dino Botica	Birkenhead United	(New Zealand) Monty Patterson	Birkenhead United
Central League	(England) Callum Cooke	Napier City Rovers	(Uruguay) Martín Bueno (United States) Kyle Carr	Miramar Rangers; Western Suburbs
Southern League	(Republic of Ireland) Garbhan Coughlan	Cashmere Technical	(Republic of Ireland) Garbhan Coughlan	Cashmere Technical
National League				
