= 2027 New Zealand National League =

Football championship

New Zealand National League
- Season: 2027
- Dates: March – September

The 2027 New Zealand Men's National League (known as the Dettol Men's National League for sponsorship reasons) is the seventh scheduled season of the National League since its restructuring in 2021, and first full winter season under its new format since 2027.

Each team can field a maximum of four foreign players as well as one additional foreign player who has Oceania Football Confederation nationality.

== Qualification ==
Qualification was based off points gained over the last 5 National League regional stage seasons. Each seasons points were weighted by the following multipliers:

- 2022 – 10%
- 2023 – 15%
- 2024 – 20%
- 2025 – 25%
- 2026 – 30%

Key
Qualified through ranking
Qualified automatically as A-League Men Reserve side
Qualified via the play-offs

=== Northern League ===
Table showing the top ten in the Northern League rankings, as well as other relevant teams.

Northern League ranking
Rank	Team	Coefficient						Weighted
Rank	Team	2022	2023	2024	2025	2026	Total	Weighted
1	Auckland City	12	12	12	9	10	56	11
2	Birkenhead United	11	5	9	11	12	48	10
3	Auckland United	10	10	8	10	9	47	9.3
4	Eastern Suburbs	3	11	10	8	11	42	9
5	Western Springs	7	8	11	12	5	43	8.6
6	East Coast Bays	—N/a	—N/a	4	7	7	18	4.7
7	Bay Olympic	5	3	7	5	2	22	4.2
8	Tauranga City	—N/a	—N/a	6	6	3	15	3.6
9	Fencibles United	—N/a	—N/a	—N/a	3	8	11	3.2
10	Melville United	9	4	2	—N/a	4	19	3.1
11	Auckland FC Reserves	—N/a	—N/a	—N/a	4	6	10	2.8

=== Central League ===
Table showing the top ten in the Central League rankings.

Central League ranking
Rank	Team	Coefficient						Weighted
Rank	Team	2022	2023	2024	2025	2026	Total	Weighted
1	Wellington Olympic	10	10	10	10	9	49	9.7
2	Napier City Rovers	7	8	8	6	10	39	8
3	Miramar Rangers	9	4	7	9	8	37	7.6
4	Western Suburbs	2	6	9	8	7	32	7
5	Wellington Phoenix Reserves	8	9	6	7	2	32	5.7
6	Waterside Karori	6	5	5	4	4	24	4.6
7	Petone	5	7	4	2	3	21	3.8
8	Island Bay United	—N/a	—N/a	3	5	5	13	3.4
9	Upper Hutt City	—N/a	—N/a	—N/a	3	6	9	2.6
10	North Wellington	4	2	2	1	—N/a	9	1.4

=== Southern League ===
Table showing the top ten in the Southern League rankings.

Southern League ranking
Rank	Team	Coefficient						Weighted
Rank	Team	2022	2023	2024	2025	2026	Total	Weighted
1	Cashmere Technical	9	9	10	8	10	46	9.3
2	Coastal Spirit	5	8	9	10	7	39	8.1
3	Christchurch United	10	10	8	9	4	41	7.6
4	Ferrymead Bays	6	6	6	5	9	32	6.7
5	Nelson Suburbs	8	5	7	7	6	33	6.5
6	Nomads United	4	4	5	6	8	27	5.9
7	Dunedin City Royals	7	7	4	4	3	25	4.5
8	Selwyn United	2	2	3	1	1	9	1.7
9	Northern	—N/a	—N/a	—N/a	—N/a	5	5	1.5
10	Wānaka	—N/a	—N/a	—N/a	3	2	5	1.4

== Teams ==
Location of clubs in New Zealand for the 2027 National League season
Location of clubs in Auckland Region for the 2027 National League season
Location of clubs in Wellington Region for the 2027 National League season

Twelve teams will compete in the league, the four highest ranked sides from the Northern League plus the Auckland FC Reserves; the three highest ranked sides from the Central League plus the Wellington Phoenix Reserves; the two highest ranked sides from the Southern League and the play-offs winner.

=== Stadiums and locations ===
Team	Home ground	Location	2026 season
Auckland City	Kiwitea Street	Sandringham, Auckland	3rd in Northern League, Qualified for 2026 National League
Auckland FC Reserves	Fred Taylor Park	Whenuapai, Auckland	7th in Northern League, Qualified for 2026 National League
Auckland United	Keith Hay Park	Mount Roskill, Auckland	4th in Northern League, Qualified for 2026 National League
Birkenhead United	Shepherds Park	Beach Haven, Auckland	1st in Northern League, Qualified for 2026 National League
Cashmere Technical	Garrick Memorial Park	Woolston, Christchurch	1st in Southern League, Qualified for 2026 National League
Coastal Spirit	Tāne Norton Park	Linwood, Christchurch	4th in Southern League
Eastern Suburbs	Madills Farm	Kohimarama, Auckland	2nd in Northern League, Qualified for 2026 National League
Miramar Rangers	David Farrington Park	Miramar, Wellington	3rd in Central League, Qualified for 2026 National League
Napier City Rovers	Bluewater Stadium	Poraiti, Napier	1st in Central League, Qualified for 2026 National League
Wellington Olympic	Wakefield Park	Island Bay, Wellington	2nd in Central League, Qualified for 2026 National League
Wellington Phoenix Reserves	Fraser Park	Taitā, Lower Hutt	9th in Central League, Qualified for 2026 National League
Western Springs	Seddon Fields	Western Springs, Auckland	8th in Northern League (promoted via play-offs)

=== Personnel ===
Team	Manager	Captain
Auckland City	(Czech Republic) Rudy Mozr	(New Zealand) Mario Ilich
Auckland FC Reserves	(New Zealand) Rory Fallon	(New Zealand) James Mitchell
Auckland United	(United States) Ben Sippola	(New Zealand) Ross Haviland
Birkenhead United	(England) Paul Hobson	(New Zealand) Dino Botica
Cashmere Technical	(England) Dan Schwarz	(England) Tom Schwarz
Coastal Spirit	(New Zealand) Robert Stanton	(New Zealand) Weston Bell
Eastern Suburbs	(New Zealand) Michael Built	(New Zealand) Jake Mechell
Miramar Rangers	(New Zealand) Kale Herbert	(New Zealand) Andy Bevin
Napier City Rovers	(England) Bill Robertson	(England) Jim Hoyle
Wellington Olympic	(New Zealand) Taylor Hall-Jones	(Cook Islands) Ben Mata
Wellington Phoenix Reserves	(New Zealand) Joshua Neff	(New Zealand) Hayden Thomas
Western Springs	(New Zealand) Danyon Drake	(Samoa) Niko Steinmetz

=== Managerial changes ===
Team	Outgoing manager	Manner of departure	Date of vacancy	Position in the table	Incoming manager	Date of appointment
Western Springs	(England) Scott Hales	Stepped down	19 September 2026	Preseason	(New Zealand) Danyon Drake	14 October 2026

== League table ==
Pos	Team	Pld	W	D	L	GF	GA	GD	Pts	Qualification
1	Auckland City	0	0	0	0	0	0	0	0	Qualification to Grand Final
2	Auckland FC Reserves (Note: Auckland FC Reserves and Wellington Phoenix Reserves can not qualify for the Grand Final.)	0	0	0	0	0	0	0	0	
3	Auckland United	0	0	0	0	0	0	0	0	Qualification to Grand Final
4	Birkenhead United	0	0	0	0	0	0	0	0	
5	Cashmere Technical	0	0	0	0	0	0	0	0	
6	Coastal Spirit	0	0	0	0	0	0	0	0	
7	Eastern Suburbs	0	0	0	0	0	0	0	0	
8	Miramar Rangers	0	0	0	0	0	0	0	0	
9	Napier City Rovers	0	0	0	0	0	0	0	0	
10	Wellington Olympic	0	0	0	0	0	0	0	0	
11	Wellington Phoenix Reserves	0	0	0	0	0	0	0	0	
12	Western Springs	0	0	0	0	0	0	0	0	

First match(es) will be played: September 2026. Source: New Zealand Football
Rules for classification: 1) Points; 2) Goal difference; 3) Goals for; 4) Goals against; 5) Head to head; 6) Disciplinary record

== Results table ==
Home \ Away	AKC	AFC	AKU	BIR	CAS	CSP	EAS	MRA	NCR	WOP	WPX	WSP
Auckland City												
Auckland FC Reserves												
Auckland United												
Birkenhead United												
Cashmere Technical												
Coastal Spirit												
Eastern Suburbs												
Miramar Rangers												
Napier City Rovers												
Wellington Olympic												
Wellington Phoenix Reserves												
Western Springs												

First match(es) will be played: March 2027. Source: New Zealand Football
Legend: Blue = home team win; Yellow = draw; Red = away team win.
