= Ben Wallace (footballer) =

New Zealand footballer (born 2004)

Personal information
- Full name: Benjamin John Wallace
- Date of birth: 26 March 2004 (age 22)
- Place of birth: Hamilton, New Zealand
- Position: Midfielder

Team information
- Current team: Auckland United
- Number: 13

Youth career
- 2019–2021: Wellington Phoenix

Senior career*
| Years | Team | Apps | (Gls) |
| 2021–2023 | Wellington Phoenix Reserves | 38 | (11) |
| 2023–2024 | Wellington Phoenix | 0 | (0) |
| 2024 | Auckland United | 22 | (3) |
| 2024–2026 | Western Springs | 29 | (12) |
| 2026– | Auckland United | 9 | (2) |

International career^{‡}
| 2023 | New Zealand U20 | 4 | (2) |
- * Club domestic league appearances and goals as of 9 May 2026 ‡ National team caps and goals as of 30 May 2023

Benjamin John Wallace (born 26 March 2004) is a New Zealand footballer who plays for National League club Auckland United.

== Club career ==
=== Wellington Phoenix ===
On 4 August 2023, Wallace made his debut for the Wellington Phoenix in an Australia Cup match against Peninsula Power.

=== Auckland United ===
Wallace signed with Auckland United for the 2024 season after not being offered a contract by Wellington Phoenix.

== International career ==
Wallace was called up to the New Zealand U20 squad for the 2023 FIFA U-20 World Cup. He made his debut in a pre-tournament friendly against Ecuador U20 scoring the only goal in a 1–0 win. Wallace played three of New Zealand's four games at the tournament scoring one goal.

== Career statistics ==
=== Club ===
As of match played on 25 April 2026.

Appearances and goals by club, season and competition
| Club | Season | League | | | Cup | | Others | | Total | |
| Club | Season | Division | Apps | Goals | Apps | Goals | Apps | Goals | Apps | Goals |
|---|---|---|---|---|---|---|---|---|---|---|
| Wellington Phoenix Reserves | 2021 | National League | 0 | 0 | — | | 1 | 0 | 1 | 0 |
| Wellington Phoenix Reserves | 2022 | National League | 17 | 5 | — | | — | | 17 | 5 |
| Wellington Phoenix Reserves | 2023 | National League | 21 | 6 | — | | — | | 21 | 6 |
| Wellington Phoenix Reserves | Total | | 38 | 11 | 0 | 0 | 1 | 0 | 39 | 11 |
| Wellington Phoenix | 2023–24 | A-League Men | 0 | 0 | 1 | 0 | 0 | 0 | 1 | 0 |
| Auckland United | 2024 | National League | 22 | 3 | 0 | 0 | — | | 22 | 3 |
| Western Springs | 2024 | National League | 6 | 1 | 0 | 0 | — | | 6 | 1 |
| Western Springs | 2025 | National League | 17 | 9 | 0 | 0 | — | | 17 | 9 |
| Western Springs | 2026 | National League | 6 | 2 | 0 | 0 | — | | 6 | 2 |
| Western Springs | Total | | 29 | 12 | 0 | 0 | 0 | 0 | 29 | 12 |
| Auckland United | 2026 | National League | 9 | 2 | 0 | 0 | — | | 9 | 2 |
| Career total | | | 98 | 28 | 1 | 0 | 1 | 0 | 99 | 28 |
