= New Zealand National League =

- Founded: 2021; 5 years ago
- Country: New Zealand
- Confederation: OFC
- Number of clubs: 11
- Level on pyramid: 1
- Domestic cup(s): Chatham Cup; Charity Cup
- International cup: OFC Champions League
- Current champions: Auckland City (3rd title) (2025)
- Most championships: Auckland City (3 titles)
- Most appearances: Gianni Bouzoukis; Riley Grover; Oscar Mason (37)
- Top scorer: Garbhan Coughlan (28)
- Broadcasters: FIFA+ TVNZ (Highlights)
- Website: nzfootball.co.nz/nzfnl
- Current: 2026 National League

The New Zealand Men's National League (NZNL), known as the Dettol Men's National League for sponsorship reasons, is a men's association football league at the top of the New Zealand football league system. Founded in 2021, the New Zealand National League is the successor to the New Zealand Football Championship. The league is contested by eleven teams, with teams qualifying from their regional leagues. Four teams qualify from the Northern League, three qualify from the Central League, two qualify from the newly formed Southern League, the Auckland FC Reserves and Wellington Phoenix Reserves are automatically given a spot each year.

The regional leagues run from March through to September, with each league having a varying number of games. The Championship phase runs after the completion of the regional phase with each team playing each other once, followed by a grand final. Each season, two clubs gain qualification to the OFC Champions League, the continental competition for the Oceania region.

As of 2023, the New Zealand National League had been Oceania's strongest national league for four consecutive years, according to IFFHS.

== Competition format ==
Regional National League Zones

There are two stages to the competition: the regional phase, in which each team plays each other twice in their respective regions; and the championship phase, in which the top teams in each region play a single round-robin competition, followed by a grand final in order to determine the champion. Each team can field a maximum of four foreign players as well as one additional foreign player who has Oceania Football Confederation nationality. Originally each team had to also start at least two players aged 20 or under in every game. Before the 2023 season this was changed so that players aged 20 or under must account for 10% of available playing minutes throughout the season.

=== Proposed changes ===
In August 2025, it was revealed that New Zealand Football planned to restructure the National League for the 2027 season, based on the structure of the former National Soccer League, following several months of consultation and feedback. The proposal would see the removal of the summer Championship phase, contested from September to December, and its replacement with a winter-based National League. Three potential formats were outlined; a 12-team round robin with a finals series, a 12-team round robin without a finals series, or a 14-team round robin without a finals series. All proposed formats would continue to allow clubs to participate in the Chatham Cup.

Among the most prominent topics of feedback was the under-20 player rule. New Zealand Football indicated a proposal to remove the current version of the rule, while ensuring the national talent development pathways are still maintained. Another area of review was the foreign player rule, which at present counts only New Zealand citizens as local players. The proposed amendment would expand this definition to include New Zealand permanent residents.

=== Qualification to OFC Champions League ===
The winners of the National League Grand-Final qualify for the OFC Champions League each season, it used to be two team qualify; those two teams being the two finalists of the championship phase.

== History ==
In March 2021, New Zealand Football announced a change to the structure of both the premiership and the top regional leagues around the country. The four top regional leagues (NRFL Premier, Central Premier League, Mainland Premier League and the FootballSouth Premier League) would be formed into the Northern League, Central League, and the Southern League. These leagues would allow local clubs to qualify for the premiership season (now known as the National League Championship), with the top 4 teams from the Northern League, the top 3 teams from the Central League, and the top 2 teams from the Southern League making up the competition, alongside the Wellington Phoenix Reserve side. All teams that qualify plus the Phoenix Reserves, would then play a single round-robin competition between October and December. The top two placed teams will then progress to the Grand Final.

In 2021 New Zealand Football announced a change in plans to the Championship phase of the 2021 competition due to COVID-19 alert levels. The Championship phase was to be split up into two 'Hubs', the Auckland Hub and the South Hub, followed by a finals series. The Auckland Hub had Northern League team competing, with the South Hub having Central League and Southern League teams competing. Later on the 1 November, after confirmation that the alert levels would not change to allow the Auckland and Waikato teams to play any further part in the National Competition, New Zealand Football announced that they were cancelling the remainder of the National League. New Zealand Football replaced this with a one-off competition, the South Central Series, for teams qualifying from the Central League and Southern League. Miramar Rangers were both the premiers and champions for this stand alone competition.

The 2022 New Zealand National League Championship phase kicked off on 1 October 2022. The 10 inaugural members were:

- Auckland City
- Auckland United
- Birkenhead United
- Cashmere Technical
- Christchurch United
- Miramar Rangers
- Melville United
- Napier City Rovers
- Wellington Olympic
- Wellington Phoenix Reserves

Auckland City were both the premiers and champions with beating Wellington Olympic in the grand final. Auckland City also won the OFC Champions League and the Chatham Cup.

The 2023 New Zealand National League Championship phase kicked off on 23 September 2023. It's Eastern Suburbs, Manurewa and Petone's first time in the league and they replacing Birkenhead United, Miramar Rangers and Melville United. Wellington Olympic were both the premiers and champions with beating Auckland City in the grand final. Auckland City won the OFC Champions League and Christchurch United won the Chatham Cup.

The 2024 New Zealand National League Championship phase kicked off on 23 September 2024. It's Coastal Spirit, Western Springs and Western Suburbs's first time in the league, they are joined by Birkenhead United competing for the second time. They replacing Auckland United, Christchurch United, Manurewa and Petone. Birkenhead United were the premiers and Auckland City were champions with beating Birkenhead United in the grand final. Auckland City won the OFC Champions League and Wellington Olympic won the Chatham Cup.

The 2025 New Zealand National League Championship phase kicked off on 27 September 2025. The league expanded for the first time to 11 teams from 10 teams, the expansions was to include New Zealand's second A-League club Auckland FC's Reserve team. It's their first time in the league, they are joined by Auckland United and Christchurch United competing for the third time, as well as Miramar Rangers for the second time. They replacing Cashmere Technical, Eastern Suburbs and Napier City Rovers. Auckland City won the OFC Champions League and Wellington Olympic won the Chatham Cup.

The 2026 New Zealand National League Championship phase kicked off on 28 September 2026. This is Ferrymead Bays's first season competing in a National League, they replace eastern rivials Coastal Spirit. Cashmere Technical, Eastern Suburbs and Napier City Rovers are back with them replacing Christchurch United, Western Springs and Western Suburbs respectfully. Auckland City won the OFC Champions League.

The 2027 New Zealand National League will be the first season under a double round robin, and will include 12 teams. All 12 teams included have previously played in the National League Championship before. The 12 members are:

- Auckland City
- Auckland FC Reserves
- Auckland United
- Birkenhead United
- Cashmere Technical
- Coastal Spirit
- Eastern Suburbs
- Miramar Rangers
- Napier City Rovers
- Wellington Olympic
- Wellington Phoenix FC Reserves
- Western Springs

== Current clubs ==
Location of clubs in New Zealand for the 2026 National League season
Northern League; Central League; Southern League
Location of clubs in Auckland Region for the 2025 National League season
Location of clubs in Wellington Region for the 2025 National League season
Location of clubs in Christchurch District for the 2025 National League season

These are the current clubs for the 2026 National League Championship phase season:

Team	Stadium	Location	Qualification
Auckland City	Kiwitea Street	Sandringham, Auckland	Northern League 3rd place
Auckland FC Reserves	Fred Taylor Park	Whenuapai, Auckland	Automatic qualification
Auckland United	Keith Hay Park	Mount Roskill, Auckland	Northern League 4th place
Birkenhead United	Shepherds Park	Beach Haven, Auckland	Northern League champion
Cashmere Technical	Garrick Memorial Park	Woolston, Christchurch	Southern League champion
Eastern Suburbs	Madills Farm	Kohimarama, Auckland	Northern League runners-up
Ferrymead Bays	Ferrymead Park	Ferrymead, Christchurch	Southern League runners-up
Miramar Rangers	David Farrington Park	Miramar, Wellington	Central League 3rd place
Napier City Rovers	Bluewater Stadium	Poraiti, Napier	Central League champion
Wellington Olympic	Wakefield Park	Island Bay, Wellington	Central League runners-up
Wellington Phoenix Reserves	Fraser Park	Taitā, Lower Hutt	Automatic qualification

=== Seasons ===
There are 18 teams that have taken part in 5 National League Championships that were played from the 2022 season until the 2026 season. The teams in bold compete in the National League Championship phase currently. The year in parentheses represents the most recent year of participation at this level. Three teams have competed in every National League Championship season, those being Auckland City, Wellington Olympic and Wellington Phoenix Reserves.

- **5** seasons: **Auckland City** (2026), **Wellington Olympic** (2026), **Wellington Phoenix Reserves** (2026)
- **4** seasons:**Auckland United** (2026), **Birkenhead United** (2026), **Cashmere Technical** (2026), **Napier City Rovers** (2026)
- **3** seasons: Christchurch United (2025), **Eastern Suburbs** (2026), **Miramar Rangers** (2026)
- **2** seasons: **Auckland FC Reserves** (2026), Coastal Spirit (2025)
- **1** season: **Ferrymead Bays** (2026), Manurewa (2023), Melville United (2022), Petone (2023)

== Sponsorship ==
On 31 January 2025, New Zealand Football agreed a multi-year sponsorship deal with cleaning brand Dettol for naming rights of the National League from the start of the 2025 season.

== Media coverage ==
Sky Sport had the broadcasting rights for the first two seasons (including the South Central Series). One game a week was live on television with the remaining four games free to air on either the Sky Sport Next or New Zealand Football YouTube channels.

In September 2023, New Zealand signed a deal to have all National League games streamed for free on FIFA+ worldwide. This includes select games of the qualifying league games as well. On 8 May 2024, New Zealand Football announced they had partnered with Sportway to continue broadcasting on FIFA+. 4K Sportway cameras have begun to be installed at grounds as of May 2024 with plans to broadcast over 200 games for the 2024 season, as well as the 2025 season.

== Past winners ==
=== Qualifying leagues ===
Season	Northern League	Central League	Southern League
2021	Auckland City	Wellington Olympic	Cashmere Technical
2022	Auckland City	Wellington Olympic	Christchurch United
2023	Auckland City	Wellington Olympic	Christchurch United
2024	Auckland City	Wellington Olympic	Cashmere Technical
2025	Western Springs	Wellington Olympic	Coastal Spirit
2026	Birkenhead United	Napier City Rovers	Cashmere Technical

=== Championship ===
Season	Grand Final		
Season	Champions	Score	Runners-up
2021 (Note: 2021 National League season cancelled due to COVID-19 pandemic in Northern regions; Championship played as South Central Series, with the northern clubs missing in the first edition.)	Miramar Rangers	7–2	Wellington Olympic
2022	Auckland City	3–2	Wellington Olympic
2023	Wellington Olympic	2–0	Auckland City
2024	Auckland City	2–1 (a.e.t.)	Birkenhead United
2025	Auckland City	2–2 (a.e.t.); 7–6 (p)	Wellington Olympic

==== By league ====
League	Wins	Clubs
Northern	3	Auckland City (3)
Central	1	Wellington Olympic (1)

==== By region ====
Region	Wins	Clubs
Auckland	3	Auckland City (3)
Wellington	1	Wellington Olympic (1)

==== By city/town ====
City / Town	Wins	Clubs
Auckland	3	Auckland City (3)
Wellington	1	Wellington Olympic (1)

== Top scorers ==
Season	Top scorer(s)	Club(s)	Goals
2021	National League season cancelled		
2022	(New Zealand) Gianni Bouzoukis (Republic of Ireland) Garbhan Coughlan	Wellington Olympic; Cashmere Technical	9
2023	(New Zealand) Gianni Bouzoukis (Republic of Ireland) Garbhan Coughlan	Wellington Olympic; Cashmere Technical	11
2024	(New Zealand) Daniel Bunch (Republic of Ireland) Garbhan Coughlan (New Zealand) Monty Patterson	Birkenhead United; Cashmere Technical; Birkenhead United	8
2025	(Uruguay) Martín Bueno	Miramar Rangers	9

== Records ==
The records are up to date as of the end of the 2025 season. As the 2021 season was cancelled, the 2021 South Central Series was not officially part of the National League.

- Biggest home win: – Western Suburbs 8–0 Coastal Spirit (5 October 2025)
- Biggest away win:
  - Napier City Rovers 0–5 Eastern Suburbs (11 November 2023)
  - Western Suburbs 2–7 Wellington Phoenix Reserves (6 December 2025)
- Highest scoring match: – Manurewa 4–6 Wellington Phoenix Reserve (8 October 2023)
- **Most goals scored in a season: 34** – Wellington Olympic (2023)
- **Most goals scored in a season (including final): 36** – Wellington Olympic (2023)
- **Fewest goals conceded in a season: 8** – Wellington Olympic (2022)
- **Highest points in a season: 23** – Wellington Olympic (2023)

=== Appearances ===
Rank	Player	Years	Apps
1	(New Zealand) **Gianni Bouzoukis**	2022–2025	37
1	(New Zealand) **Riley Grover**	2022–2025	37
1	(New Zealand) **Oscar Mason**	2022–2025	37
4	(New Zealand) **Scott Basalaj**	2022–2025	36
5	(New Zealand) **Tor Davenport Petersen**	2022–2025	35
6	(New Zealand) **Michael Den Heijer**	2022–2025	34
6	(New Zealand) **Adam Mitchell**	2022–2025	34
8	(New Zealand) **Jack-Henry Sinclair**	2022–2025	33
8	(New Zealand) **Benjamin Wallace**	2022–2025	33
10	(New Zealand) **Mario Ilich**	2022–2025	32
10	(New Zealand) **Justin Gulley**	2022–2025	32
10	(New Zealand) **Sam Lack**	2022–2025	32
10	(Cook Islands) **Benjamin Mata**	2022–2025	32
10	(New Zealand) **Kaelin Nguyen**	2022–2025	32
As of 6 December 2025; **Bolded** players still playing in National League.

=== Top scorers ===
Rank	Player	Years	Goals	Apps	Ratio
1	(Republic of Ireland) Garbhan Coughlan	2022–2024	28	25	1.12
2	(New Zealand) **Gianni Bouzoukis**	2022–2025	26	37	0.7
3	(New Zealand) **Jack-Henry Sinclair**	2022–2025	14	33	0.42
4	(New Zealand) **Angus Kilkolly**	2022–2025	13	28	0.46
5	(New Zealand) Monty Patterson	2023–2024	10	16	0.63
5	(New Zealand) **Edward Wilkinson**	2022–2024	10	24	0.42
7	(New Zealand) **Myer Bevan**	2022–2025	9	17	0.53
7	(Uruguay) **Martín Bueno**	2025	9	10	0.9
7	(New Zealand) Daniel Bunch	2023–2024	9	13	0.75
7	(New Zealand) **Hamish Watson**	2022–2025	9	23	0.39
As of 6 December 2025; **Bolded** players still playing in the National League.

=== MVP winners ===
Season	Winner(s)	Club(s)
2022	(Croatia) Silvio Rodić	Birkenhead United
2023	(Republic of Ireland) Garbhan Coughlan	Cashmere Technical
2024	(New Zealand) Monty Patterson	Birkenhead United
2025	(New Zealand) Owen Smith	Miramar Rangers

=== Steve Sumner Trophy ===
Season	Winner(s)	Club(s)
2023	(New Zealand) Joel Stevens	Wellington Olympic
2024	(New Zealand) Mario Ilich	Auckland City
2025	(Pakistan) Haris Zeb	Auckland City

== Related competitions ==
=== OFC Champions League ===
The OFC Champions League, also known as the O-League, is the premier football competition in Oceania. It is organised by the OFC, Oceania's football governing body. It has been organised since 2007 under the current format, following its successor, the Oceania Club Championship. Two teams from the New Zealand National League participate annually.

=== Charity Cup ===
The Charity Cup was introduced in 2011 and is contested between the winner of the National League Grand Final and the winner of the Chatham Cup. Although it was planned to start in 2022 after the inaugural season of the National League, the Charity Cup only restarted in 2024.

== See also ==
- Football in New Zealand
- New Zealand National Soccer League
- National Women's League
