= Birkenhead United AFC =

Birkenhead United
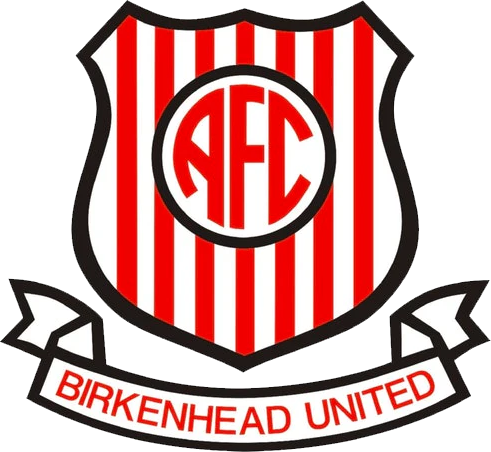
- Full name: Birkenhead United Association Football Club
- Nickname: Birko
- Founded: 1960
- Ground: Shepherds Park, Beach Haven, North Shore
- President: William Taylor
- Manager: Paul Hobson
- League: National League
- 2026: Northern League, 1st of 12; National League, TBD
- Website: https://birkenheadunited.org.nz/
Home colours	Away colours

Birkenhead United AFC is an association football club based in Beach Haven, on the North Shore of Auckland, New Zealand. They currently compete in the National League.

== Club history ==
The club was established as Birkenhead in 1960 before it amalgamated with Birkdale in 1963, taking its current name as Birkenhead United. Since 1965, Birkenhead have mainly played either in Division 1 or Division 2 of the Northern League though they twice early on, made it into Premier Division in 1968 and 1970, only to be relegated again that same year. They also had one of their best early runs in the 1970 Chatham Cup, making it to the 5th round before losing to Eden 1–4. They wouldn't repeat that success in the cup again until 2010. Again going down in the 5th round, this time to Glenfield Rovers.

Birkenhead started to see more success in the 2010s, with them again making the Premier Division in 2013 and they have stayed there since. They have just missed out on winning the division four times in 2013, 2014, 2016 and 2017. The success in the local league was also replicated in the Chatham Cup, where in 2012 and 2013 they made the quarter-finals. 2015 they made the semi-finals, only losing 3–4 on penalties to Napier City Rovers, before they finally won the cup in 2016, beating local rivals Waitakere City 3–2 in extra time. They wouldn't have to wait very long before they won the cup again, when in the 2018 Chatham Cup, they made the finals. This time they were facing Wellington side Western Suburbs and after 120 minutes the score was tied 1–1 before Birkenhead prevailed on penalties 5–4 to claim the cup for a second time in three years. In 2021, the club formed a strategic partnership with Scottish Premiership outfit St Mirren FC, alongside Nelson Suburbs.

== Season by season record ==
Season	Qualifying league	League									New Zealand National League									Chatham Cup	Top scorer	
Season	Qualifying league	P	W	D	L	F	A	GD	Pts	Pos	P	W	D	L	F	A	GD	Pts	Pos	Chatham Cup	Name	Goals
2021	Northern League	19	10	3	6	50	33	+17	33	4th	Cancelled (Note: 2021 National League season cancelled due to COVID-19 pandemic in Northern regions. Championship played as South Central Series, with the northern clubs missing in the first edition.)									R5	(New Zealand) Alex Greive ♦	19
2022	Northern League	22	16	2	4	56	24	+32	50	2nd	9	4	2	3	19	17	+2	14	4th	R5	(New Zealand) Cameron MacKenzie	8
2023	Northern League	22	7	4	11	46	44	+2	25	8th	Did not qualify									R5	(New Zealand) Luke Jorgensen	9
2024	Northern League	22	13	4	5	54	31	+23	43	4th	9	6	2	1	23	16	+7	20	2nd	SF	(New Zealand) Monty Patterson	14
2025	Northern League	22	12	5	5	55	33	+22	41	2nd	10	5	0	5	20	21	−1	15	6th	QF		
2026	Northern League	22	18	4	0	58	13	+45	58	1st	In progress									R3		

Season	League	Div	P	W	D	L	GF	GA	GD	Pts	League Position	Chatham Cup	Top scorer	
Season	League	Div	P	W	D	L	GF	GA	GD	Pts	League Position	Chatham Cup	Name	Goals
2027	National League	1									TBD			

	Champions
	Runners-up
	Third Place
♦	Top scorer in competition

Chatham Cup
Preceded by Eastern Suburbs	Winner; 2016 Chatham Cup	Succeeded by Onehunga Sports
Preceded by Onehunga Sports	Winner; 2018 Chatham Cup	Succeeded by Napier City Rovers

== Honours ==
League

- Northern League (1): 2026
