= Auckland United FC =

Auckland United
- Full name: Auckland United Football Club
- Nickname: Aucks United
- Founded: 2020; 6 years ago
- Ground: Keith Hay Park, Mount Roskill, New Zealand
- President: Dean Cudmore
- Head coach: Ben Sippola
- League: National League
- 2026: Northern League, 4th of 12; National League, TBD
- Website: aucklandunitedfc.org.nz
Home colours	Away colours

Auckland United Football Club is an association football club based in Mount Roskill, New Zealand.

Formed in 2020 as an amalgamation between Onehunga Sports and Three Kings United, Auckland United currently competes in the National League.

The club also competes in the Chatham Cup and Kate Sheppard Cup, New Zealand's premier knockout tournaments for men and women respectively. Both teams received byes in the 2021 Chatham Cup and 2021 Kate Sheppard Cup for the preliminary and first round, along with other ranked teams. The men got their first win of the Chatham Cup when they beat Cambridge 9–0, the women's team also won their first game 9–0 over Papamoa FC in the Kate Sheppard Cup. In 2023, the Auckland United women's team won the NRFL Premiership and the New Zealand Women's National League.

== Players ==
=== First-team squad ===
As of 14 May 2026

Note: Flags indicate national team as defined under FIFA eligibility rules; some limited exceptions apply. Players may hold more than one non-FIFA nationality.

No.	Pos.	Nation	Player
1	GK	COK	Ngereine Maro
2	DF	NZL	Albie Francis-Alles
3	DF	NZL	Leo Hall
5	DF	NZL	Boyd Curry (captain)
6	DF	NZL	Abdallah Khaled
7	DF	NZL	Riley Manuel
8	MF	USA	Julien Cristales
9	FW	NZL	Luke Flowerdew
10	MF	USA	Jack Beer
11	FW	NZL	Matt Conroy
12	DF	NZL	Will Mendoza
13	DF	NZL	Ben Wallace
14	DF	NZL	Oliver Campbell
15	MF	NZL	Bruce Izumi

No.	Pos.	Nation	Player
16	MF	NZL	Tiahn Manuel
17	DF	NZL	Harshae Raniga
18	MF	ENG	Jonah Pastiroff
19	MF	JPN	Shuto Kono
20	FW	NZL	Matias Nunez
21	MF	NZL	Ryan Varney
22	GK	ENG	Freddie Martin
22	DF	NZL	Mahaki Pomare-Rakena
26	DF	FIJ	Al-taaf Sahib
28	FW	NZL	Jedd White
32	DF	NZL	Cameron Siebert
33	DF	USA	Logan Phipps
35	GK	NZL	Jack Maxwell-Bates

== Season by season record ==
Season	Qualifying league	League									National League									Chatham Cup	Top scorer	
Season	Qualifying league	P	W	D	L	F	A	GD	Pts	Pos	P	W	D	L	F	A	GD	Pts	Pos	Chatham Cup	Name	Goals
2021	Northern League	19	10	5	4	42	25	+17	35	2nd	Cancelled (Note: 2021 National League season cancelled due to COVID-19 pandemic in Northern regions;. Championship played as South Central Series, with the northern clubs missing in the first edition.)									3R	(New Zealand) Monty Patterson	15
2022	Northern League	22	15	4	3	60	22	+38	49	3rd	9	5	2	2	14	13	+1	17	3rd	4R	(New Zealand) Joshua Redfearn	13
2023	Northern League	22	13	4	5	50	24	+26	43	3rd	9	2	4	3	15	17	-2	10	7th	2R	(New Zealand) Joshua Redfearn	12
2024	Northern League	22	12	4	6	39	27	+12	40	5th	Did not qualify									3R	(New Zealand) Oliver Fay, (New Zealand) Joshua Tollervey	7
2025	Northern League	22	12	4	6	47	32	+15	40	3rd	10	2	2	6	11	19	−8	8	10th	2nd		

Season	League											Chatham Cup	Continental	Top scorer	
Season	Division	Tier	P	W	D	L	GF	GA	GD	Pts	Pos	Chatham Cup	Continental	Name	Goals
2027	National League	1									TBD				

== Honours ==
=== Women's ===
League

- NRFL Women's Premiership
  - Champions (2): 2023, 2024
- New Zealand Women's National League
  - Champions (3): 2023, 2024, 2025

Cup

- Kate Sheppard Cup
  - Winners (3): 2022, 2024, 2025

Continental

- OFC Women's Champions League
  - Winners (2): 2024, 2025

== See also ==
- Auckland Football Federation

== Notes ==
Kate Sheppard Cup
Preceded by Wellington United	Winner; 2022 Kate Sheppard Cup	Succeeded by Western Springs
Preceded by Western Springs	Winner; 2024 Kate Sheppard Cup	Succeeded by Auckland United
Preceded by Auckland United	Winner; 2025 Kate Sheppard Cup	Succeeded by to be played
