= 2021 New Zealand National League =

Football championship

New Zealand National League
- Season: 2021
- Dates: 27 March 2021 - 12 December 2021
- Champions: Cancelled

The 2021 New Zealand National League was the first scheduled season of the National League since its restructuring in 2021. 30 clubs competed in the competition, with four having been planned to qualify from the Northern League, three qualifying from the Central League and two qualifying from the Southern League for the National Championship phase along with the automatically qualified Wellington Phoenix Reserves. Each team was allowed to field a maximum of four foreign players as well as one additional foreign player who has Oceania Football Confederation nationality. Each team had to also have at least two players aged 20 or under in the starting eleven.

Because the Wellington Phoenix Reserves need to hold a partnership with an affiliated club through a Memorandum of Understanding (MoU) to be in the league and have a place in the Championship phase, their current MoU was with Lower Hutt City. This meant Lower Hutt could not qualify for the Championship even if they finish in the top three of the Central League.

New Zealand Football announced on the 14 September that they had decided to terminate the remainder of the Northern League season and cancel any yet to be played fixtures due to COVID-19 and Auckland being in Level 4. The decision was made because they couldn't complete all the games before the Championship phase was due to begin, so places in the next phase where awarded off the standing before Auckland went into lockdown.

On the 8 October, New Zealand Football announced a change in plans to the Championship phase of the 2021 competition due to COVID-19 alert levels. The Championship phase was to be split up into two 'Hubs', the Auckland Hub and the South Hub, where teams play every other team in their hub in a single round robin. The top two clubs from each hub would have then qualified for a finals phase consisting of semis and a Grand Final.

On the 2 November, after confirmation that the alert levels would not change to allow the Auckland and Waikato teams to play any further part in the National Competition, New Zealand Football announced that they were cancelling the remainder of the National League. In its place, they instead decided on a one-off interregional competition, the National League: South Central Series.

== Qualifying leagues ==
=== 2021 Northern League ===
Northern League
- Season: 2021
- Dates: 27 March 2021 - 14 August 2021
- Champions: Auckland City
- Relegated: Northern Rovers; West Coast Rangers
- Matches: 112
- Goals: 423 (3.78 per match)
- Top goalscorer: Alex Greive (19)
- Biggest home win: Birkenhead United 9–0 Melville United (1 May 2021)
- Biggest away win: Bay Olympic 2–7 Hamilton Wanderers (24 April 2021); Eastern Suburbs 0–5 Auckland City (22 May 2021); Hamilton Wanderers 0–5 Auckland City (17 July 2021)
- Highest scoring: Birkenhead United 9–0 Melville United (1 May 2021); Bay Olympic 2–7 Hamilton Wanderers (24 April 2021); Auckland United 6–3 Northern Rovers (17 July 2021)
- Longest winning run: 6 matches Auckland City
- Longest unbeaten run: 11 matches Auckland City

==== Northern League teams ====
Team	Home ground	Location	Notes
Auckland City	Kiwitea Street	Sandringham, Auckland	Replaces sister club Central United F.C. for 2021 season
Auckland United	Keith Hay Park	Mount Roskill, Auckland	
Bay Olympic	Olympic Park	New Lynn, Auckland	2nd in 2019 NRFL Division 1; promoted
Birkenhead United	Shepherds Park	Beach Haven, Auckland	
Eastern Suburbs	Madills Farm	Kohimarama, Auckland	
Hamilton Wanderers	Porritt Stadium	Chartwell, Hamilton	
Manukau United	Centre Park	Māngere East, Auckland	
Melville United	Gower Park	Melville, Hamilton	
North Shore United	Allen Hill Stadium	Devonport, Auckland	
Northern Rovers	McFetridge Park	Glenfield, Auckland	Merger between Glenfield Rovers AFC and Forrest Hill Milford United AFC
West Coast Rangers	Fred Taylor Park	Whenuapai, Auckland	Merger between Waitakere City FC and Norwest United ahead of 2021 season
Western Springs	Seddon Fields	Westmere, Auckland	

==== Northern League table ====
Pos	Team	Pld	W	D	L	GF	GA	GD	Pts	Qualification
1	Auckland City (C, Q)	18	15	1	2	63	19	+44	46	Winner of Northern League and qualification to National League Championship
2	Auckland United (Q)	19	10	5	4	42	25	+17	35	Qualification to National League Championship
3	Eastern Suburbs (Q)	19	10	4	5	31	21	+10	34	Qualification to National League Championship
4	Birkenhead United (Q)	19	10	3	6	50	33	+17	33	Qualification to National League Championship
5	Western Springs	18	8	4	6	44	35	+9	28	
6	Bay Olympic	18	7	4	7	26	38	−12	25	
7	Hamilton Wanderers	18	6	5	7	35	44	−9	23	
8	Manukau United	19	5	7	7	33	35	−2	22	
9	North Shore United	19	5	7	7	35	40	−5	22	
10	Melville United	19	6	3	10	24	40	−16	21	
11	Northern Rovers (R)	19	2	5	12	22	41	−19	11	Relegation to NRFL Division 1
12	West Coast Rangers (R)	19	3	2	14	18	52	−34	11	Relegation to NRFL Division 1

Source: Auckland Football
Rules for classification: 1) Points; 2) Goal difference; 3) Goals scored; 4) Goals against; 5) Head to head; 6) Disciplinary record; 7) Coin toss
(C) Champions; (Q) Qualified for the phase indicated; (R) Relegated
- Melville won 1–0, but West Coast fielded an ineligible player. Result upgraded to a 3–0 win for Melville.
- North Shore won 2–0, but West Coast fielded an ineligible player. Result upgraded to a 3–0 win for North Shore.
- League completed early with games still in hand due to COVID-19 and Auckland being in Level 4.

==== Northern League results table ====
Home \ Away	AC	AU	BO	BU	ES	HW	MAN	MEL	NS	NR	WC	WS
Auckland City	—	3–1	7–0	5–0	DNP	3–1	3–1	DNP	4–1	2–1	2–0	4–3
Auckland United	DNP	—	1–2	5–0	2–0	7–0	2–2	1–0	1–1	6–3	4–1	1–4
Bay Olympic	1–2	1–1	—	0–3	1–2	2–7	4–3	DNP	DNP	6–2	1–0	3–2
Birkenhead United	4–3	0–1	DNP	—	2–1	0–3	2–2	9–0	7–1	1–1	3–1	2–3
Eastern Suburbs	0–5	2–0	1–0	4–2	—	DNP	0–0	1–1	0–0	2–0	DNP	1–1
Hamilton Wanderers	0–5	1–3	DNP	3–3	2–1	—	1–4	2–2	1–2	4–3	2–2	DNP
Manukau United	2–2	3–3	3–1	DNP	0–3	1–2	—	3–5	1–1	2–0	3–2	DNP
Melville United	0–3	DNP	0–1	0–3	0–1	1–1	0–1	—	1–0	0–1	3–0 (Note: Melville won 1–0, but West Coast fielded an ineligible player. Result upgraded to a 3–0 win for Melville.)	5–3
North Shore United	3–2	1–1	1–2	2–3	3–4	1–1	DNP	3–2	—	2–2	4–1	4–4
Northern Rovers	1–4	1–2	0–0	1–2	0–3	3–2	1–1	0–1	DNP	—	DNP	1–1
West Coast Rangers	0–4	0–3	3–3	0–4	0–4	DNP	0–1	2–0	0–3 (Note: North Shore won 2–0, but West Coast fielded an ineligible player. Result upgraded to a 3–0 win for North Shore.)	3–2	—	1–5
Western Springs	DNP	0–2	1–1	2–0	2–1	1–2	2–1	6–2	3–2	DNP (Note: DNP = Did not play due to season finishing early)	1–2	—

Source: Soccerway
Legend: Blue = home team win; Yellow = draw; Red = away team win.

==== Northern League scoring ====
As of Completed as of 14 August 2021

===== Northern League top scorers =====
Rank	Player	Club	Goals
1	Alex Greive	Birkenhead United	19
2	Angus Kilkolly	Auckland City	18
3	Monty Patterson	Auckland United	15
4	Jake Mechell	Eastern Suburbs	12
5	Horace James	North Shore United	10
5	Joseph Lee	North Shore United	10
5	Kayne Vincent	Western Springs	10
8	Sam Margetts	Western Springs	9
9	Maro Bonsu-Maro	Manukau United	8
9	Adam Dickinson	Northern Rovers	8
9	Sanni Issa	Birkenhead United / Manukau United	8
9	Emiliano Tade	Auckland City	8

===== Northern League hat-tricks =====
Round	Player	For	Against	Home/Away	Result	Date
1	Jama Boss (Note: Player scored 4 goals)	Melville United	Manukau United	Home	5–3	27 March 2021
3	Alex Greive	Birkenhead United	West Coast Rangers	Away	4–0	5 April 2021
5	Alex Greive	Birkenhead United	North Shore United	Away	3–2	17 April 2021
6	Michael Built	Eastern Suburbs	Birkenhead United	Home	4–2	24 April 2021
7	Alex Greive	Birkenhead United	Melville United	Home	9–0	1 May 2021
7	Alex Connor-McClean	Birkenhead United	Melville United	Home	9–0	1 May 2021
10	Emiliano Tade	Auckland City	Eastern Suburbs	Away	5–0	22 May 2021
15	Jake Mechell	Eastern Suburbs	North Shore United	Away	4-3	17 July 2021
16	Monty Patterson	Auckland United	Hamilton Wanderers	Home	7-0	24 July 2021

=== 2021 Central League ===
Central League
- Season: 2021
- Dates: 27 March 2021 – 25 September 2021
- Champions: Wellington Olympic
- Relegated: Wainiuomata
- Matches: 90
- Goals: 434 (4.82 per match)
- Top goalscorer: George Ott (21)
- Biggest home win: Lower Hutt City 12–1 Wainuiomata (26 June 2021)
- Biggest away win: Wainuiomata 1–7 Miramar Rangers (3 July 2021); Napier City Rovers 0–6 Western Suburbs (15 August 2021)
- Highest scoring: Lower Hutt City 12–1 Wainuiomata (26 June 2021)
- Longest winning run: 8 matches Lower Hutt City
- Longest unbeaten run: 14 matches Miramar Rangers

==== Central League teams ====
Team	Home ground	Location
Lower Hutt City	Fraser Park	Lower Hutt
Miramar Rangers	David Farrington Park	Miramar, Wellington
Napier City Rovers	Bluewater Stadium	Napier
North Wellington	Alex Moore Park	Johnsonville, Wellington
Petone	Memorial Park	Petone, Lower Hutt
Wainuiomata	Richard Prouse Park	Wainuiomata, Lower Hutt
Wairarapa United	Memorial Park Turf	Masterton
Waterside Karori	Karori Park	Karori, Wellington
Wellington Olympic	Wakefield Park	Wellington
Western Suburbs	Endeavour Park	Porirua

==== Central League table ====
Pos	Team	Pld	W	D	L	GF	GA	GD	Pts	Qualification
1	Wellington Olympic (C, Q)	18	15	2	1	59	18	+41	47	Winner of Central League and qualification to National League Championship
2	Miramar Rangers (Q)	18	13	3	2	64	17	+47	42	Qualification to National League Championship
3	Lower Hutt City (Note: Lower Hutt City cannot qualify for the National League Championship phase due to their MoU with Wellington Phoenix Reserves.)	18	13	2	3	70	26	+44	41	
4	Western Suburbs (Q)	18	9	4	5	46	25	+21	31	Qualification to National League Championship
5	Wairarapa United (R)	18	6	6	6	37	44	−7	24	Withdrew before the 2022 season. (Note: Wairarapa United withdrew two weeks before the 2022 season and were replaced by Wellington United.)
6	Waterside Karori	18	6	4	8	31	42	−11	22	
7	Napier City Rovers	18	5	2	11	37	51	−14	17	
8	North Wellington	18	4	4	10	46	57	−11	16	
9	Petone	18	4	0	14	27	68	−41	12	
10	Wainuiomata (R)	18	1	1	16	17	86	−69	4	Relegation to Capital Premier

Source: Capital Football
Rules for classification: 1) Points; 2) Goal difference; 3) Goals scored; 4) Goals against; 5) Head to head; 6) Disciplinary record; 7) Coin toss
(C) Champions; (Q) Qualified for the phase indicated; (R) Relegated

==== Central League results table ====
Home \ Away	LH	MR	NC	NW	PT	WN	WU	WK	WO	WS
Lower Hutt City	—	4–2	3–0	3–1	6–0	12–1	3–0	4–2	1–2	4–1
Miramar Rangers	1–0	—	4–2	5–2	7–1	6–0	8–1	2–1	0–0	0–0
Napier City Rovers	1–5	1–4	—	5–4	7–0	5–0	2–3	0–0	0–3	0–6
North Wellington	4–5	1–1	4–4	—	4–6	1–3	3–4	2–3	3–3	2–3
Petone	1–5	0–4	0–1	3–5	—	4–2	0–1	3–1	1–3	1–3
Wainuiomata	1–5	1–7	1–5	1–2	2–4	—	1–1	1–3	1–7	1–4
Wairarapa United	1–4	0–5	5–0	2–2	4–2	7–0	—	1–1	1–6	2–2
Waterside Karori	4–4	1–4	3–2	0–3	4–0	2–1	2–2	—	2–4	1–0
Wellington Olympic	3–1	1–0	2–1	2–3	7–1	4–0	1–0	6–0	—	3–2
Western Suburbs	1–1	1–4	4–1	4–0	2–0	7–0	2–2	3–1	1–2	—

Source: Soccerway
Legend: Blue = home team win; Yellow = draw; Red = away team win.

==== Central League scoring ====
As of Completed as of 25 September 2021

===== Central League top scorers =====
Rank	Player	Club	Goals
1	George Ott	Lower Hutt City	21
2	Riley Bidois	Lower Hutt City	16
3	Jared Cunniff	Wellington Olympic	15
4	Gianni Bouzoukis	Wellington Olympic	14
4	Sam Mason-Smith	Miramar Rangers	14
6	Kailan Gould	Napier City Rovers / Wellington Olympic	11
6	Jack-Henry Sinclair	Wellington Olympic	11
6	Luis Toomey	Lower Hutt City	11
9	Ihaia Delaney	North Wellington / Western Suburbs	10
9	João Moreira	Miramar Rangers	10

===== Central League hat-tricks =====
Round	Player	For	Against	Home/Away	Result	Date
2	Riley Bidois	Lower Hutt City	Petone	Away	1–5	2 April 2021
2	Kailan Gould (Note: Player scored 4 goals)	Napier City Rovers	Petone	Home	7–0	18 April 2021
6	Sam Mason-Smith	Miramar Rangers	Wairarapa United	Home	8–1	1 May 2021
7	Sam Mason-Smith	Miramar Rangers	Petone	Away	0–4	8 May 2021
7	Jared Cunniff	Wairarapa United	Wainuiomata	Home	7–0	8 May 2021
8	George Ott	Lower Hutt City	Wairarapa United	Away	1–4	22 May 2021
8	Max Batchelor	North Wellington	Petone	Away	3–5	22 May 2021
8	João Moreira	Miramar Rangers	Napier City Rovers	Away	1–4	23 May 2021
9	Jaga Scott-Greenfield	Petone	Wainuiomata	Away	2–4	29 May 2021
10	Gianni Bouzoukis	Wellington Olympic	Wairarapa United	Away	1–6	5 June 2021
12	Luis Toomey (Note: Player scored 5 goals)	Lower Hutt City	Wainuiomata	Home	12–1	26 June 2021
12	George Ott	Lower Hutt City	Wainuiomata	Home	12–1	26 June 2021
15	Gianni Bouzoukis	Wellington Olympic	Petone	Home	7–1	24 July 2021
15	Ihaia Delaney	Western Suburbs	Wainuiomata	Home	7–0	25 July 2021
16	Ollie Whyte	Miramar Rangers	Petone	Home	7–1	7 August 2021
17	Stefan Cordwell	Waterside Karori	Lower Hutt City	Home	4–4	14 August 2021
17	Isaac Snell	Petone FC	Wainuiomata	Home	4–2	14 August 2021

=== 2021 Southern League ===
Southern League
- Season: 2021
- Dates: 17 July 2021 - 3 October 2021
- Champions: Cashmere Technical
- Relegated: Otago University
- Matches: 28
- Goals: 121 (4.32 per match)
- Top goalscorer: Garbhan Coughlan; Edward Wilkinson (7 goals each)
- Biggest home win: Otago University 6–0 Green Island (30 September 2021)
- Biggest away win: Otago University 0–4 Cashmere Technical (8 August 2021)
- Highest scoring: Cashmere Technical 6–2 Green Island (17 July 2021)
- Longest winning run: 5 matches Cashmere Technical
- Longest unbeaten run: 5 matches Cashmere Technical

==== Southern League teams ====
Unlike the Northern and Central Leagues, the Southern League is the culmination of two regional tournaments, each of which provide teams to the Southern League in much the same way as the Northern, Central, and Southern Leagues provide teams for the National League. The top five teams in the Mainland Premier League and top three teams from the FootballSouth Premier League qualify for entry into the Southern League.

Team	Home ground	Location	Competition
Cashmere Technical	Garrick Memorial Park	Woolston, Christchurch	Mainland Premier League champions
Christchurch United	United Sports Centre	Yaldhurst, Christchurch	Mainland Premier League, 3rd
Coastal Spirit	Linfield Park	Linwood, Christchurch	Mainland Premier League, 2nd
Green Island	Sunnyvale Park	Green Island, Dunedin	FootballSouth Premier League, 2nd
Nelson Suburbs	Saxton Field	Nelson	Mainland Premier League, 4th
Otago University	Football Turf	Dunedin North	FootballSouth Premier League, 3rd
Selwyn United	Foster Park	Rolleston	Mainland Premier League, 5th
South City Royals	Football Turf	Dunedin North	FootballSouth Premier League champions

==== Southern League personnel ====
Team	Manager	Captain
Cashmere Technical	(England) Dan Schwarz	(England) Tom Schwarz
Christchurch United	(New Zealand) Danny Halligan	(Northern Ireland) Daniel McCay
Coastal Spirit	(New Zealand) Ekow Quainoo	(New Zealand) Michael Hogan
Green Island	(New Zealand) Shane Carvell	(New Zealand) Tom Milton
Nelson Suburbs	(New Zealand) Neil Connell	(Australia) Sam Ayers
Otago University	(New Zealand) Darren Hart	(New Zealand) Timothy O'Farrell
Selwyn United	(New Zealand) Chris Brown	(New Zealand) Jayden Booth
South City Royals	(New Zealand) Richard Murray	(New Zealand) Jared Grove

==== Southern League table ====
Pos	Team	Pld	W	D	L	GF	GA	GD	Pts	Qualification
1	Cashmere Technical (C, Q)	7	6	0	1	25	7	+18	18	Winner of Southern League and qualification to National League Championship
2	Selwyn United (Q)	7	4	1	2	14	12	+2	13	Qualification to National League Championship
3	South City Royals	7	4	0	3	15	16	−1	12	
4	Otago University (R)	7	4	0	3	14	15	−1	12	Relegated to the FootballSouth Premier League (Note: Otago University were relegated due to not meeting the requirements of the 2022 National League.)/Mainland Premier League
5	Christchurch United	7	3	1	3	20	15	+5	10	
6	Coastal Spirit	7	3	0	4	12	12	0	9	
7	Nelson Suburbs	7	1	1	5	10	17	−7	4	
8	Green Island	7	1	1	5	11	27	−16	4	

Source: Southern Football
Rules for classification: 1) Points; 2) Goal difference; 3) Goals scored; 4) Goals against; 5) Head to head; 6) Disciplinary record; 7) Coin toss
(C) Champions; (Q) Qualified for the phase indicated; (R) Relegated

==== Southern League results table ====
Home \ Away	CT	CU	CS	GI	NS	OU	SU	SC
Cashmere Technical		3–2	0–1	6–2				5–0
Christchurch United			3–2			5–0		3–4
Coastal Spirit					1–0	3–0	2–4	
Green Island		2–4	3–2		2–4			1–4
Nelson Suburbs	1–5	1–1				1–3	1–2	
Otago University	0–4			6–0			3–1	
Selwyn United	1–2	3–2		1–1				
South City Royals			2–1		3–2	1–2	1–2	

Source: Soccerway
Legend: Blue = home team win; Yellow = draw; Red = away team win.

==== Southern League scoring ====
As of Completed

===== Southern League top scorers =====
Rank	Player	Club	Goals
1	Garbhan Coughlan	Cashmere Technical	7
1	Edward Wilkinson	Christchurch United	7
3	Ryan Fleming	South City Royals	6
4	Kenshin Hayashi	Coastal Spirit	5
4	Daniel McClay	Christchurch United	5
6	Cameron Anderson	Green Island	4
6	Aidan Barbour-Ryan	Otago University	4
6	Oliver Colloty	Christchurch United	4
6	Adam Hewson	Green Island	4
6	Yuya Taguchi	Cashmere Technical	4

===== Southern League hat-tricks =====
Round	Player	For	Against	Home/Away	Result	Date
3	Garbhan Coughlan	Cashmere Technical	Otago University	Away	0–4	8 August 2021
6	Yuya Taguchi	Cashmere Technical	South City Royals	Home	5-0	25 August 2021

===== Own goals =====
Round	Player	Club	Against
3	Timothy O'Farrell	Otago University	Cashmere Technical
7	Cameron Brewitt	Green Island	Coastal Spirit

== Qualified clubs ==

Association	Team	Position in Regional League	App (last)	Previous best (last)
Northern League (4 berths)	Auckland City	1st	1st (Note: Debut under new competition but played National League before in the New Zealand Football Championship)	Debut (Note: Previously won the National League when playing in the New Zealand Football Championship)
Northern League (4 berths)	Auckland United	2nd	1st	Debut
Northern League (4 berths)	Eastern Suburbs	3rd	1st	Debut
Northern League (4 berths)	Birkenhead United	4th	1st	Debut
Central League (3 berths)	Wellington Olympic	1st	1st	Debut
Central League (3 berths)	Miramar Rangers	2nd	1st (Note: Debut under new competition but played National League before in the New Zealand National Soccer League)	Debut (Note: Previously won the National League when playing in the New Zealand National Soccer League)
Central League (3 berths)	Western Suburbs	4th (Note: Lower Hutt City finished third but cannot qualify for the National League Championship phase due to their MoU with Wellington Phoenix Reserves.)	1st	Debut (Note: Previously finished 8th when playing in the New Zealand National Soccer League)
Southern League (2 berths)	Cashmere Technical	1st	1st	Debut
Southern League (2 berths)	Selwyn United	2nd	1st	Debut
Wellington Phoenix (automatic berth)	Wellington Phoenix Reserves	Automatic qualification	1st	Debut (Note: Previously best is 6th place in the New Zealand Football Championship in 2014–15)

== Championship phase ==
New Zealand National League: South Central Series
- Season: 2021
- Dates: 6 November 2021 - 12 December 2021
- Champions: Miramar Rangers
- Matches: 16
- Goals: 70 (4.38 per match)
- Best player: Pieter-Taco Bierema (Selwyn United)
- Top goalscorer: Ollie Whyte (7 goals)
- Biggest home win: Wellington Phoenix Reserves 6–0 Western Suburbs (4 December 2021)
- Biggest away win: Selwyn United 0–5 Wellington Phoenix Reserves (27 November 2021)
- Highest scoring: Miramar Rangers 7–2 Wellington Olympic (12 December 2021)

=== South Central Series ===
With confirmation that the alert levels were not changing to a level that would allow Auckland and Waikato teams to play in the National Competition, New Zealand Football announced that they were cancelling the rest of the National League. In its place, they instead decided on a one-off interregional competition, the National League: South Central Series. New Zealand Football also confirmed that the National League: South Central Series did not have any bearing on OFC Champions League qualification, which is separately being discussed with the OFC.

==== South Central table ====
Pos	Team	Pld	W	D	L	GF	GA	GD	Pts	Qualification
1	Miramar Rangers (C, Q)	5	3	2	0	13	10	+3	11	Qualification to Grand Final
2	Wellington Olympic (Q)	5	3	1	1	15	13	+2	10	Qualification to Grand Final
3	Cashmere Technical	5	3	0	2	8	4	+4	9	
4	Wellington Phoenix Reserves	5	2	0	3	15	8	+7	6	
5	Western Suburbs	5	2	0	3	6	11	−5	6	
6	Selwyn United	5	0	1	4	4	15	−11	1	

Updated to match(es) played on 5 December 2021. Source: New Zealand Football
Rules for classification: 1) Points; 2) Head to head points; 3) Head to head goal difference; 4) Goal difference; 5) Goals scored
(C) Champions; (Q) Qualified for the phase indicated

==== South Central results table ====
Home \ Away	CT	MR	SU	WO	WP	WS
Cashmere Technical		1–2		5–1		0–1
Miramar Rangers			2–2	4–4	3–2	
Selwyn United	0–1				0–5	
Wellington Olympic			4–1			2–1
Wellington Phoenix Reserves	0–1			2–4		6–0
Western Suburbs		1–2	3–1			

Updated to match(es) played on 5 December 2021. Source: New Zealand Football
Legend: Blue = home team win; Yellow = draw; Red = away team win.

===== South Central positions by round =====
The table lists the positions of teams after each week of matches. To preserve chronological evolvements, any postponed matches are not included in the round at which they were originally scheduled, but added to the full round they were played immediately afterwards. For example, if a match is scheduled for round 13, but then postponed and played between rounds 16 and 17, it is added to the standings for round 16.

Team ╲ Round	1	2	3	4	5
Miramar Rangers	2	2	2	2	1
Wellington Olympic	1	1	1	1	2
Cashmere Technical	3	4	4	4	3
Wellington Phoenix Reserves	6	5	5	5	4
Western Suburbs	4	3	3	3	5
Selwyn United	5	6	6	6	6

Leader and Grand Final
Grand Final

Updated to match(es) played on 5 December 2021. Source: New Zealand Football

=== Grand Final ===
Sunday, 12 December 2021
14:00 NZDT

Miramar Rangers	7–2	Wellington Olympic
Simes 8'; Mason-Smith 24'; Whyte 27', 39'; Delhommelle 52'; Midgley 59'; Moreira 87'	Report	Bouzoukis 19'; Chote 31'

Jerry Collins Stadium, Wellington
Referee: Campbell-Kirk Kawana-Waugh

== Statistics ==
As of 12 December 2021

=== Top scorers ===
Rank	Player	Club	Goals
1	Ollie Whyte	Miramar Rangers	7
2	Kailan Gould	Wellington Olympic	5
2	Luis Toomey	Wellington Phoenix Reserves	5
4	Sam Mason-Smith	Miramar Rangers	4
4	Ben Mata	Wellington Olympic	4
4	João Moreira	Miramar Rangers	4
4	Josh Rudland	Wellington Phoenix Reserves	4
4	Oskar van Hattum	Wellington Phoenix Reserves	4
9	Garbhan Coughlan	Cashmere Technical	3
10	Gianni Bouzoukis	Wellington Olympic	2
10	Harry Chote	Wellington Olympic	2
10	Ihaia Delaney	Western Suburbs	2
10	Hugo Delhommelle	Miramar Rangers	2
10	Wan Gatkek	Western Suburbs	2
10	Kaelin Nguyen	Wellington Phoenix Reserves	2
10	Yuya Taguchi	Cashmere Technical	2

=== Hat-tricks ===
Round	Player	For	Against	Home/Away	Result	Date
2	Kailan Gould	Wellington Olympic	Selwyn United	Home	4–1	13 November 2021
3	Ollie Whyte	Miramar Rangers	Wellington Olympic	Home	4–4	20 November 2021
4	Josh Rudland	Wellington Phoenix	Selwyn United	Away	0–5	27 November 2021
5	Luis Toomey	Wellington Phoenix	Western Suburbs	Home	6–0	4 December 2021

=== Records ===
The records that follow are accurate as of the end of the 2021 South Central Series. Only games played in the South Central Series (including the final) are considered below. As the 2021 National League season was cancelled, this series is not officially part of the National League records.

- Biggest home win: – Wellington Phoenix Reserves 6–0 Western Suburbs (4 December 2021)
- Biggest away win: – Selwyn United 0–5 Wellington Phoenix Reserves (27 November 2021)
- Highest scoring match: 9 goals – Miramar Rangers 7–2 Wellington Olympic (12 December 2021)
- Most goals scored in the season: 15 – Wellington Olympic, Wellington Phoenix Reserves
- Most goals scored in the season (including final): 20 – Miramar Rangers
- Fewest goals conceded in the season: 4 – Cashmere Technical
- Highest points in the season: 11 – Miramar Rangers

Season	Top scorer	Club	Goals
2021	(New Zealand) Ollie Whyte	Miramar Rangers	7

== Awards ==
League	MVP	Club	Top scorer	Club
Northern League	(New Zealand) Alex Greive	Birkenhead United	(New Zealand) Alex Greive	Birkenhead United
Central League	(New Zealand) Jonty Roubos	Wairarapa United	(New Zealand) George Ott	Lower Hutt City
Southern League	(New Zealand) Pieter-Taco Bierema	Selwyn United	(Republic of Ireland) Garbhan Coughlan	Cashmere Technical
South Central Series	(New Zealand) Pieter-Taco Bierema	Selwyn United	(New Zealand) Ollie Whyte	Miramar Rangers

Team of the season
Goalkeeper	(New Zealand) Pieter-Taco Bierema (Selwyn United)			
Defenders	(England) Tom Schwarz (Cashmere Technical)		(New Zealand) Taylor Schrijvers (Miramar Rangers)	(Cook Islands) Ben Mata (Wellington Olympic)
Midfielders	(New Zealand) Jack-Henry Sinclair (Wellington Olympic)	(France) Hugo Delhommelle (Miramar Rangers)	(New Zealand) Luis Toomey (Wellington Phoenix Reserves)	(New Zealand) Robert Sabo (Western Suburbs)
Forwards	(New Zealand) Oskar van Hattum (Wellington Phoenix Reserves)		(New Zealand) Ollie Whyte (Miramar Rangers)	(England) Kailan Gould (Wellington Olympic)
