= Alex Greive =

New Zealand footballer (born 1999)

Personal information
- Date of birth: 13 May 1999 (age 27)
- Height: 1.78 m (5 ft 10 in)
- Position: Striker

Team information
- Current team: San Antonio FC
- Number: 11

Youth career
- 2013: Papakura City
- 2014: Waitakere City

College career
Years	Team	Apps	(Gls)
2017–2019	Northern Kentucky Norse	48	(20)

Senior career*
Years	Team	Apps	(Gls)
2015–2017	Birkenhead United		
2019	Cincinnati Dutch Lions	10	(2)
2020–2021	Waitakere United	14	(6)
2021	Birkenhead United	19	(19)
2022–2024	St Mirren	63	(8)
2024	→ Dundee United (loan)	13	(1)
2024	Bohemians	11	(0)
2025–	San Antonio FC	15	(2)

International career^{‡}
2022–	New Zealand	14	(2)
Medal record
Men's football
Representing New Zealand
OFC Nations Cup
Winner	2024 Fiji/Vanuatu
- * Club domestic league appearances and goals as of 31 October 2026 ‡ National team caps and goals as of 2 July 2024

Alexander Greive (born 13 May 1999) is a New Zealand professional footballer who plays as a striker for USL Championship club San Antonio FC.

== Club career ==
Greive played youth football with Papakura City and Waitakere City. He began his senior career with Birkenhead United in New Zealand's NRFL Premier in 2015, at 15 years of age.

Greive played college soccer with the Northern Kentucky Norse, also appearing at club level for the Cincinnati Dutch Lions in 2019 whilst studying. Greive spent the 2020–21 season with Waitakere United in the New Zealand Football Championship. After playing with Birkenhead United, scoring 19 goals in 19 games in the 2021 season, and winning the Northern League Golden Boot, he signed for Scottish club St Mirren in January 2022.

He moved on loan to Dundee United in January 2024.

In July 2024 he signed for League of Ireland Premier Division club Bohemians on a multi-year contract. On 29 December 2024, it was announced that he had departed the club after 2 goals in 15 appearances in all competitions.

Greive signed a multi-year contract with USL Championship club San Antonio FC in January 2025.

== International career ==
On 26 January 2022, Greive earned his first call-up to the New Zealand national team for friendly matches against Jordan and Uzbekistan as a late replacement for Andre de Jong. He made his international debut in the match against Jordan, appearing as an 82nd-minute substitute. In his first start for New Zealand on 24 March 2022 he scored two goals, his first international goals.

== International goals ==
No.	Date	Venue	Opponent	Score	Result	Competition	Ref.
1.	24 March 2022	Suheim bin Hamad Stadium, Doha, Qatar	New Caledonia	1–0	7–1	2022 FIFA World Cup qualification	
2.	24 March 2022	Suheim bin Hamad Stadium, Doha, Qatar	New Caledonia	3–1	7–1	2022 FIFA World Cup qualification	

== Honours ==
New Zealand

- OFC Nations Cup: 2024

Individual

- Northern League Golden Boot: 2021
- Northern League MVP: 2021
