= FC Western =

Football club in New Plymouth, New Zealand

- Full name: FC Western
- Founded: Circa 2004
- Ground: Lynmouth Park, Lynmouth, New Plymouth
- Capacity: 1,000
- Manager: Josh Dobson
- League: Central League
- 2026: Central League, 10th of 10
- Website: https://www.sporty.co.nz/fcwestern/
Home colours

FC Western is a football club based in New Plymouth, New Zealand. They currently play in the Central League.

== History ==
The club first competed in the Chatham Cup in 2021, with their best appearance being in 2023 where they reached the fourth round, losing to Central League side Petone 3–0.

In 2025, FC Western won the inaugural Central League 2, gaining promotion to the Central League.

FC Western have two grounds, Lynmouth Parkin Lynmouth and Ngamoto Domain in Moturoa.

== Squad ==
Note: Flags indicate national team as defined under FIFA eligibility rules; some limited exceptions apply. Players may hold more than one non-FIFA nationality.

No.	Pos.	Nation	Player
—	GK	NZL	Nicholas Reive
15	GK	NZL	Michael Reive
—	GK	NZL	Charlie Lamplough
30	GK	NZL	Nicholas Walker
6	DF	NZL	Braedan Quilter-Phipps
4	DF	USA	Evan Walters
23	DF	USA	Remo Merlo
—	DF	NZL	Jackson Bigwood
2	DF	NZL	Cameron Bell
8	DF	NZL	Bryn Kearton
—	MF	NZL	Leo Elder
—	MF	NZL	Javarn Walsh
—	MF	NZL	Scott Manning
3	MF	NZL	Gabriel Marsden
5	MF	GHA	Junior Agyekum
22	MF	NZL	Cody Woodhead
3	MF	NZL	Toby Gower-Johnson
—	MF	MAR	Ilias El Maakoul
27	MF	NZL	Dante Thomas
7	FW	ENG	Ardian Gashi
11	FW	NZL	Benjamin Furze
8	FW	SAM	Alman Kwan
11	FW	VEN	Alfonso Porras
11	FW	NZL	Lewis Cumberledge
—	FW	NZL	Leo Taylor
—	FW	NZL	David Garner
—	FW	NZL	Babu Khan

== Honours ==
- Central League 2: 2025
- Taranaki Premiership: 2022
