= Monty Patterson =

New Zealand footballer (born 1996)

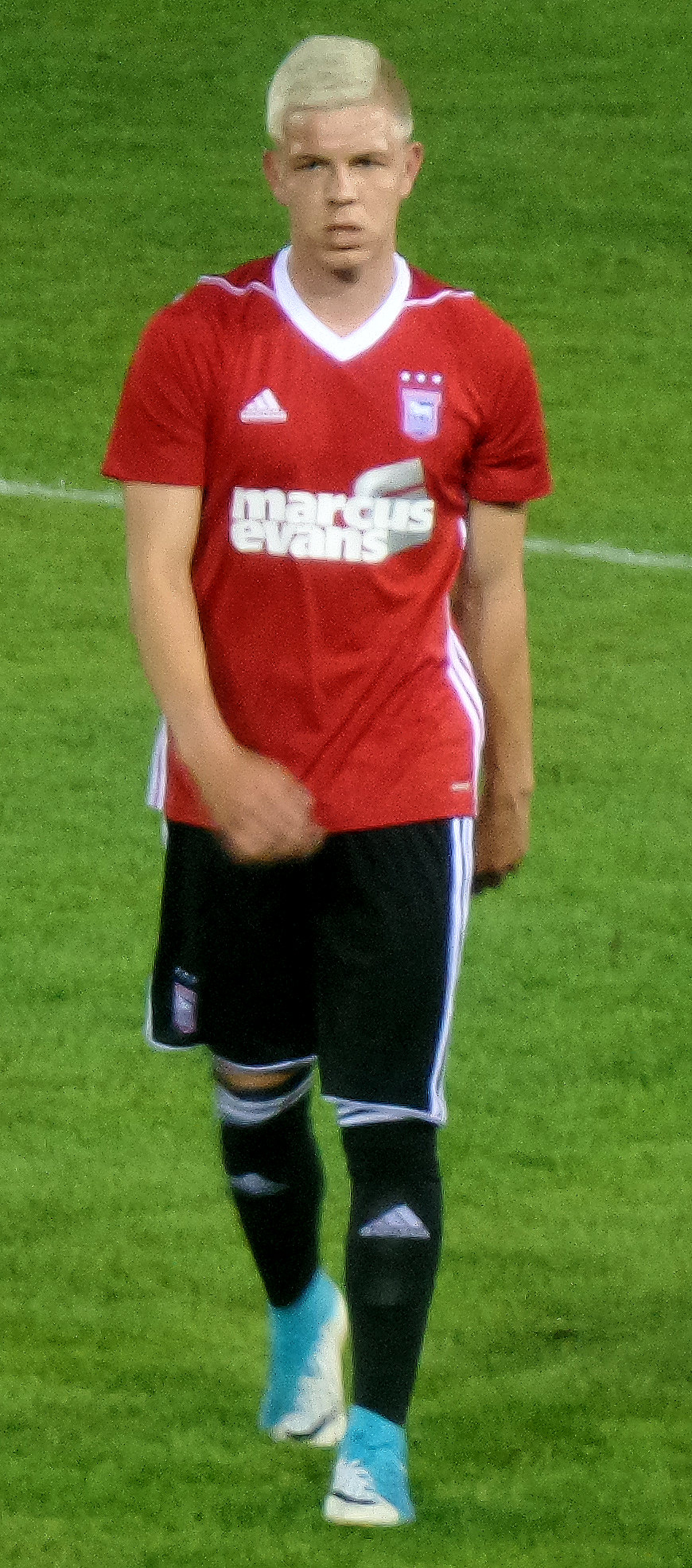
- Monty Patterson playing for Ipswich Town in 2017

Personal information
- Full name: Monty Mark Patterson
- Date of birth: 9 December 1996 (age 29)
- Place of birth: Auckland, New Zealand
- Height: 1.78 m (5 ft 10 in)
- Position: Forward

Team information
- Current team: Birkenhead United
- Number: 10

Youth career
- Eastern Suburbs
- 2013–2016: Ipswich Town

Senior career*
Years	Team	Apps	(Gls)
2016–2018	Ipswich Town	0	(0)
2016–2017	→ Braintree Town (loan)	12	(1)
2018	→ Wellington Phoenix (loan)	4	(0)
2018	→ Wellington Phoenix Reserves (loan)	2	(1)
2018	Oklahoma City Energy	3	(1)
2019	Hønefoss	20	(5)
2020–2021	Auckland United	24	(18)
2022–2023	Manurewa	24	(16)
2023–2024	Birkenhead United	28	(22)
2025	Atlético Ottawa	16	(1)
2026–	Birkenhead United		

International career^{‡}
2013	New Zealand U17	9	(6)
2014–2015	New Zealand U20	6	(4)
2015	New Zealand U23	3	(3)
2016–	New Zealand	15	(1)
- * Club domestic league appearances and goals as of 21 October 2025 ‡ National team caps and goals as of 30 May 2018

Monty Mark Patterson (born 9 December 1996) is a New Zealand professional footballer who plays as a forward for National League club Birkenhead United.

Born in New Zealand, Patterson moved to England in 2013 where he played youth football for Ipswich Town.

He represented New Zealand's senior national team fifteen times after debuting in the 2016 OFC Nations Cup. He has also represented New Zealand at youth level, including at the 2013 FIFA U-17 World Cup and the 2015 FIFA U-20 World Cup.

== Club career ==
=== Ipswich Town ===
In 2013, when playing for Eastern Suburbs, Patterson had a successful trial at Ipswich Town and was subsequently offered a contract. He missed a significant amount of the 2015–16 Professional U21 Development League after breaking his leg in the first match of the season. He signed a one-year professional deal with Ipswich in July 2016. He went on to make his full senior debut on 22 August 2017, substituted on in a 2–1 EFL Cup defeat against Crystal Palace.

On 17 May 2018, it was announced Patterson was one of four players released from Ipswich.

==== Braintree Town (loan) ====
In October 2016 he joined Braintree Town of the National League on a month-long loan. He scored his first goal for the club in a win over Eastbourne Borough in the first round of the 2016–17 FA Cup. Patterson returned to Ipswich at the end of December 2016, after appearing eight times and scoring once in all competitions.

On 9 February 2017, Patterson returned to Braintree Town, this time on loan for the remainder of the 2016–17 campaign.

==== Wellington Phoenix (loan) ====
On 31 January 2018, Patterson was loaned to A-League club Wellington Phoenix until the end of the season.

=== OKC Energy ===
On 30 July 2018, Patterson signed with United Soccer League side OKC Energy. He was released by the team at the end of their 2018 season.

=== Atlético Ottawa ===
On 26 February 2025, Patterson signed a two-year contract with Canadian Premier League side Atlético Ottawa.

== International career ==
Patterson was a member of the New Zealand under-23 squad for the 2015 Pacific Games. They were eliminated in the semi-finals after their win against Vanuatu was overturned by the OFC for fielding an ineligible player, causing the side to miss qualification for the 2016 Olympics.

Patterson was first called up to the New Zealand national team for the 2016 OFC Nations Cup. He made his senior international debut in the first game of the tournament, a win over Fiji. He played the first 53 minutes of the final, New Zealand winning the title after defeating Papua New Guinea in a penalty shoot-out.

Patterson scored his first goal for New Zealand in a draw with United States on 11 October 2016.

== Career statistics ==
=== Club ===
As of 9 November 2025

Appearances and goals by club, season and competition
Club	Season	League			National cup (Note: All appearances in the FA Cup)		League cup (Note: Appearance in the EFL Cup)		Continental		Other		Total	
Club	Season	Division	Apps	Goals	Apps	Goals	Apps	Goals	Apps	Goals	Apps	Goals	Apps	Goals
Ipswich Town	2017–18	Championship	0	0	0	0	1	0	–		–		1	0
Braintree Town (loan)	2016–17	National League	12	1	2	1	–		–		1 (Note: Appearance in the FA Trophy)	0	15	2
Wellington Phoenix (loan)	2017–18	A-League	4	0	0	0	–		–		–		4	0
OKC Energy	2018	USL	3	1	0	0	–		–		–		3	1
Hønefoss	2019	3. divisjon	19	5	1	0	–		–		–		20	5
Auckland United	2020	NRFL Premier	6	3	–		–		–		–		6	3
Auckland United	2021	National League	18	15	0	0	–		–		–		18	15
Auckland United	Total		24	18	0	0	0	0	0	0	0	0	24	18
Manurewa	2023	National League	24	16	0	0	–		–		–		24	16
Birkenhead United	2024	National League	28	22	2	2	–		–		–		30	24
Atlético Ottawa	2025	Canadian Premier League	16	1	5	0	–		–		1	0	22	1
Birkenhead United	2026	National League	0	0	0	0	–		–		–		0	0
Career total			130	64	10	3	1	0	0	0	2	0	143	67

=== International ===
Appearances and goals by national team and year
National team	Year	Apps	Goals
New Zealand	2016	9	1
New Zealand	2017	6	0
Total		15	1

Scores and results list New Zealand's goal tally first.

#	Date	Venue	Opponent	Score	Result	Competition
1.	11 October 2016	RFK Stadium, Washington, D.C., United States	United States	1–1	1–1	Friendly

== Honours ==
=== International ===
New Zealand

- OFC Nations Cup: 2016
- OFC U-17 Championship: 2013

Individual

- OFC U-17 Championship Golden Ball: 2013
- OFC U-17 Championship Golden Boot: 2013

=== Club ===
Atlético Ottawa

- Canadian Premier League: 2025

== See also ==
- List of New Zealand international footballers
