= Ngereine Maro =

Cook Islands footballer (born 2005)

Personal information
- Full name: Ngereine Zachary Maro
- Date of birth: 20 March 2005 (age 21)
- Height: 1.87 m (6 ft 2 in)
- Position: Goalkeeper

Team information
- Current team: Auckland United
- Number: 1

Youth career
- 2016-2020: Christchurch United
- 2021: Western Suburbs

Senior career*
Years	Team	Apps	(Gls)
2022-2023	Western Suburbs	15	(0)
2023	Titikaveka		
2023–2024	RPC		
2024–2026	Eintracht Nordhorn	16	(0)
2026	Auckland United	5	(0)
2027–	South Island United	0	(0)

International career^{‡}
2023–	Cook Islands	5	(0)
- * Club domestic league appearances and goals as of 4 January 2026 ‡ National team caps and goals as of 4 January 2026

Ngereine Zachary Maro (born 20 March 2005) is a Cook Islands professional footballer who plays as a goalkeeper for OFC Professional League club South Island United.

== Career ==
Maro was born on 20 March 2005. He operates as a goalkeeper. He was described as "confident... on the ball". He started his career with New Zealand side Western Suburbs. On 3 April 2022, he debuted for the club in their 0–8 defeat to Miramar Rangers. He made fifteen league appearances and scored zero goals. In 2023, he signed for Cook Islands side Titikaveka. After that, he signed for Dutch side RPC. Previously, he attended a football school in Germany.

Maro is a Cook Islands international. On 21 November 2023, he debuted for the Cook Islands national football team during a 2–1 win over the Tonga national football team. He played for the Cook Islands national football team at the 2024 OFC Men's Nations Cup, the 2023 Pacific Games and 2026 FIFA World Cup qualification.
