= Northern League (New Zealand) =

- Organising body: Northern Region Football
- Founded: 1965
- Country: New Zealand
- Confederation: OFC (Oceania)
- Number of clubs: 12
- Level on pyramid: 2
- Feeder to: National League
- Relegation to: NRFL Championship
- Current champions: Birkenhead United (1st title) (2026)
- Most championships: Auckland City; Bay Olympic; Takapuna; Central United (4 titles)
- Most appearances: Derek Tieku (105)
- Top scorer: Derek Tieku (61)
- Broadcaster: FIFA+ (selected matches)
- Website: Northern Region Football
- Current: 2026 Northern League

The Northern League, known as the Dettol Northern League for sponsorship reasons, is an amateur New Zealand association football competition. It is a top-tier competition during the winter season, and sits at step two after then.

The Northern League includes football clubs located in the northern part of the North Island from the Northland, Auckland, Waikato and Bay of Plenty regions. The competition was known as the NRFL Premier until 2021, when New Zealand's football league system was restructured. Clubs compete each season to qualify for the New Zealand National League.

== History ==
=== The first four years (1965–1969) ===
In the years 1965–1969, before the launch of a National Soccer League, the Northern League was the highest level competition available to the clubs in the northern region. When the National Soccer League was created in 1970, the Northern League became one of its feeder leagues.

In 1997 and 1998, when the National Soccer League operated as an invitation-only summer league, the Northern League again became the highest level club competition available to the clubs from the northern provinces.

=== Football Championship (2004–2021) ===
With the demise of the club-based National Soccer League in 2004, the Northern League, now known as Lotto Sport Italia NRFL Men's Premier, became part of the highest level of football league competition in New Zealand for the third time in its history. The league runs between the New Zealand autumn and winter months (April to September), while the New Zealand Football Championship runs between the New Zealand spring and summer months (October to March).

=== National League (2021–) ===
Auckland City dominance
Season	Champions	Runners-up
2021	Auckland City	Auckland United
2022	Auckland City	Birkenhead United
2023	Auckland City	Eastern Suburbs
2024	Auckland City	Western Springs
2025	Western Springs	Birkenhead United
Oceania Double winners Quadruple winners

In March 2021, New Zealand Football announced a change to the structure of both the premiership and the top regional leagues around the country. The four top regional leagues (NRFL Premier, Central Premier League, Mainland Premier League and the FootballSouth Premier League) would be formed into the Northern League, Central League, and the Southern League. These leagues would allow local clubs to qualify for the premiership season (now known as the National League Championship), with the top 4 teams from the Northern League, the top 3 teams from the Central League, and the top 2 teams from the Southern League making up the competition, alongside the Wellington Phoenix Reserve side. All teams that qualify plus the Phoenix Reserves, would then play a single round-robin competition between September and December.

The first few season were dominated by Auckland City after replacing sister club Central United at the dissolution of the New Zealand Football Championship. Auckland City won the league four consecutive times in their first four seasons. In the 2023 season, Auckland City and Eastern Suburbs completed the season undefeated. This is the first time, since Eastern Suburbs did so in the inaugural 1965 season, and the first time two clubs have done so in the same season. Western Springs won their first title in 2025, breaking Auckland City's dominance since they joined the league.

== Current Northern League structure ==
- Northern League (this page)
- NRFL Championship
- NRFL Northern Conference / NRFL Southern Conference
- NRF League One/ WaiBOP League One
- Community Leagues

== Sponsorship ==
On 31 January 2025, New Zealand Football agreed a multi-year sponsorship deal with cleaning brand Dettol for naming rights of the National League (including the regional leagues) from the start of the 2025 season.

The following list is of the official sponsors of the League, unless otherwise noted.

=== Current ===
- (South Korea) Kia Motors 2010–2012, (marketing partner)
- (Italy) Lotto Sport Italia 2008–2012, (primary sponsor)
- (New Zealand) ASB Bank 2010–2012, (marketing partner)
- Prime (New Zealand) 2010–2012, (TV channel), (TV partner)
- (New Zealand) FTN – Family Television Network 2010–2012, (TV channel), (TV partner)
- (New Zealand) TVNZ 2010–2012,(TV channel), (official TV sponsor)
- (New Zealand) Sky Network Television 2009–present, (TV channel), (TV partner – For national & international broadcasting)

== Current clubs ==
Location of clubs in New Zealand for the 2026 Northern League season
Location of clubs in Auckland Region for the 2026 Northern League season

As of the 2026 season.

Team	Location	Home ground	2025 season
Auckland City	Sandringham, Auckland	Kiwitea Street	4th
Auckland FC Reserves	Whenuapai, Auckland	Fred Taylor Park	9th
Auckland United	Mount Roskill, Auckland	Keith Hay Park	3rd
Bay Olympic	New Lynn, Auckland	Olympic Park	8th
Birkenhead United	Beach Haven, Auckland	Shepherds Park	2nd
East Coast Bays	Northcross, Auckland	Bay City Park	6th
Eastern Suburbs	Kohimarama, Auckland	Madills Farm	5th
Fencibles United	Pakuranga, Auckland	Riverhills Domain	10th
Manukau United	Māngere East, Auckland	Centre Park	1st in Championship (promoted)
Melville United	Hamilton Lake, Hamilton	Gower Park	2nd in Championship (promoted)
Tauranga City	Mount Maunganui, Tauranga	Links Avenue	7th
Western Springs	Westmere, Auckland	Seddon Fields	1st

== Past champions ==
- 1965 – Eastern Suburbs
- 1966 – Eastern Suburbs
- 1967 – Ponsonby AFC
- 1968 – Mount Wellington
- 1969 – Mount Wellington
- 1970 – Mt Albert
- 1971 – Takapuna City
- 1972 – Hamilton Wanderers
- 1973 – North Shore United
- 1974 – Eden
- 1975 – Manurewa
- 1976 – Hamilton Wanderers
- 1977 – Courier Rangers
- 1978 – Manurewa
- 1979 – Hamilton Wanderers
- 1980 – Takapuna City
- 1981 – East Coast Bays
- 1982 – Papatoetoe
- 1983 – University of Auckland
- 1984 – Hamilton Wanderers
- 1985 – Takapuna City
- 1986 – Mount Maunganui
- 1987 – AFC Waikato
- 1988 – Takapuna City
- 1989 – Mount Roskill
- 1990 – Mt Albert-Ponsonby
- 1991 – Papatoetoe
- 1992 – Oratia United
- 1993 – Ellerslie
- 1994 – Mount Maunganui
- 1995 – Melville United
- 1996 – Lynn-Avon United
- 1997 – Mount Wellington
- 1998 – Metro F.C.
- 1999 – Tauranga City
- 2000 – Tauranga City
- 2001 – North Shore United
- 2002 – Glenfield Rovers
- 2003 – Glenfield Rovers
- 2004 – Central United
- 2005 – Bay Olympic
- 2006 – Bay Olympic
- 2007 – Central United
- 2008 – Central United
- 2009 – Melville United
- 2010 – East Coast Bays
- 2011 – Bay Olympic
- 2012 – Bay Olympic
- 2013 – East Coast Bays
- 2014 – Glenfield Rovers
- 2015 – Eastern Suburbs
- 2016 – Central United
- 2017 – Onehunga Sports
- 2018 – Onehunga Sports
- 2019 – North Shore United
- 2020 – season cancelled due to COVID-19
- 2021 – Auckland City
- 2022 – Auckland City
- 2023 – Auckland City
- 2024 – Auckland City
- 2025 – Western Springs
- 2026 – Birkenhead United

== Performance by club ==
Club	Location	Titles	Last title
Takapuna City	Takapuna	4	1988
Bay Olympic	New Lynn	4	2011
Central United	Auckland	4	2016
Auckland City	Sandringham	4	2024
Hamilton Wanderers	Hamilton	3	1984
Mount Wellington	Auckland	3	1997
East Coast Bays	North Shore	3	2013
Glenfield Rovers	Glenfield	3	2014
Eastern Suburbs	Kohimarama	3	2015
North Shore United	North Shore	3	2019
Papatoetoe	Papatoetoe	2	1991
Mount Maunganui	Tauranga	2	1994
Tauranga City	Tauranga	2	2000
Melville United	Melville	2	2009

== Notable players ==
This list consists of past or present notable players that have either represented an international team, or made more than fifty appearances at a professional level in their careers.

- (New Zealand) Chris Wood
- (New Zealand) Danny Hay
- (New Zealand) Jeremy Christie
- (New Zealand) Cameron Howieson
- (New Zealand) Te Atawhai Hudson-Wihongi
- (New Zealand) Tim Payne
- (New Zealand) Marco Rojas
- (New Zealand) Ryan Thomas
- (New Zealand) Ivan Vicelich
- (New Zealand) Gareth Rowe
- (New Zealand) Ross Nicholson
- (New Zealand) Kayne Vincent
- (New Zealand) Cole Tinkler
- (New Zealand) Kris Bright
- (New Zealand) Alex Greive
- (New Zealand) Monty Patterson
- (Papua New Guinea) David Browne
- (Papua New Guinea) Tommy Semmy
- (Samoa) Faitalia Hamilton
- (Solomon Islands) Micah Lea'alafa
- (Somalia) Jama Boss
- (Somalia) Mohamed Awad
- (Puerto Rico) Alex Oikkonen
- (Argentina) Emiliano Tade
- (Croatia) Mario Bilen
- (Croatia) Silvio Rodić
- (Republic of Ireland) Sean Devine
- (Serbia) Marko Đorđević
- (Spain) Albert Riera
- (Spain) Víctor Espasandín

== Top scorers ==
The following list is from the 2021 season onwards after New Zealand Football changed the football league system in New Zealand. From 2021, the Northern League has acted as a qualifier league to the National League.

Season	Top scorer(s)	Club(s)	Goals
2021	(New Zealand) Alex Greive	Birkenhead United	19
2022	(Ghana) Derek Tieku	Hamilton Wanderers	17
2023	(New Zealand) Ryan de Vries (Ghana) Derek Tieku	Auckland City; Hamilton Wanderers	19
2024	(New Zealand) Jake Mechell	Eastern Suburbs	19
2025	(United States) Michael Suski (Argentina) Emiliano Tade (New Zealand) Morgan Wellsbury	Birkenhead United; Auckland United; Tauranga City	14
2026	(New Zealand) Monty Patterson	Birkenhead United	12

== Records ==
The following records are from the 2021 season onwards after New Zealand Football changed the football league system in New Zealand. From 2021, the Northern League has acted as a qualifier league to the National League. The records are up to date as of the end of the 2026 season.

- **Most wins in a season: 20** – Auckland City (2022)
- **Fewest defeats in a season: 0**
  - Auckland City, Eastern Suburbs (both 2023)
  - Birkenhead United (2026)
- **Most goals scored in a season: 68** – Auckland City (2022)
- **Fewest goals conceded in a season: 9**
  - Auckland City (2023)
  - Eastern Suburbs (2026)
- **Most points in a season: 61** – Auckland City (2022)
- **Fewest points in a season: 7** – Manukau United (2026)
- **Highest goal difference: 55** – Auckland City (2023)
- Biggest home win: – Birkenhead United 9–0 Melville United (1 May 2021)
- Biggest away win: – Manukau United 0–7 Birkenhead United (1 April 2023)
- **Highest scoring match: 10 goals**
  - Auckland City 7–3 Melville United (20 April 2024)
- Biggest title-winning margin: – 11 points
  - 2021, Auckland City (46 points) over Auckland United (35 points)
  - 2022, Auckland City (61 points) over Birkenhead United (50 points)
  - 2026, Birkenhead United (58 points) over Eastern Suburbs (47 points)
- Smallest title-winning margin: – 1 point, 2025, Western Springs (42 points) over Birkenhead United (41 points)

=== Appearances ===
Rank	Player	Years	Apps
1	(Ghana) **Derek Tieku**	2021–2025	105
2	(Fiji) Shuiab Khan	2021–2025	101
3	(New Zealand) Reid Drake	2021–2025	96
3	(New Zealand) **Ross Haviland**	2021–2025	96
5	(New Zealand) **Callum McNeill**	2021–2025	95
5	(New Zealand) Leon Van Den Hoven	2021–2025	95
7	(New Zealand) Nicholas Milicich	2021–2025	91
8	(New Zealand) **Dino Botica**	2021–2025	90
8	(New Zealand) Sam Burfoot	2021–2025	90
10	(New Zealand) **Kelvin Kalua**	2021–2025	89
As of 30 August 2025; **Bolded** players still playing in Northern League.

=== Top scorers ===
Rank	Player	Years	Goals	Apps	Ratio
1	(Ghana) **Derek Tieku**	2021–2025	61	105	0.58
2	(Argentina) Emiliano Tade	2021–2025	45	65	0.69
2	(New Zealand) **Jake Mechell**	2021–2025	45	75	0.6
4	(New Zealand) **Monty Patterson**	2021, 2023–2024	42	53	0.79
5	(New Zealand) **Angus Kilkolly**	2021–2025	41	79	0.52
6	(New Zealand) Reid Drake	2021–2025	34	96	0.35
7	(New Zealand) **Ryan De Vries**	2021–2025	32	59	0.66
8	(New Zealand) Joshua Redfearn	2021–2023	28	56	0.5
9	(New Zealand) Joseph Lee	2023–2025	26	86	0.3
9	(England) Dawson Straffon	2021–2025	26	70	0.37
As of 30 August 2025; **Bolded** players still playing in the Northern League.

=== MVP Winners ===
Season	Winner(s)	Club(s)
2021	(New Zealand) Alex Greive	Birkenhead United
2022	(Ghana) Derek Tieku	Hamilton Wanderers
2023	(Ghana) Derek Tieku	Hamilton Wanderers
2024	(New Zealand) Jake Mechell	Eastern Suburbs
2025	(Ghana) Derek Tieku	Bay Olympic
2026	(New Zealand) Dino Botica	Birkenhead United
