= Maidstone Park =

Sports and recreation park in New Zealand

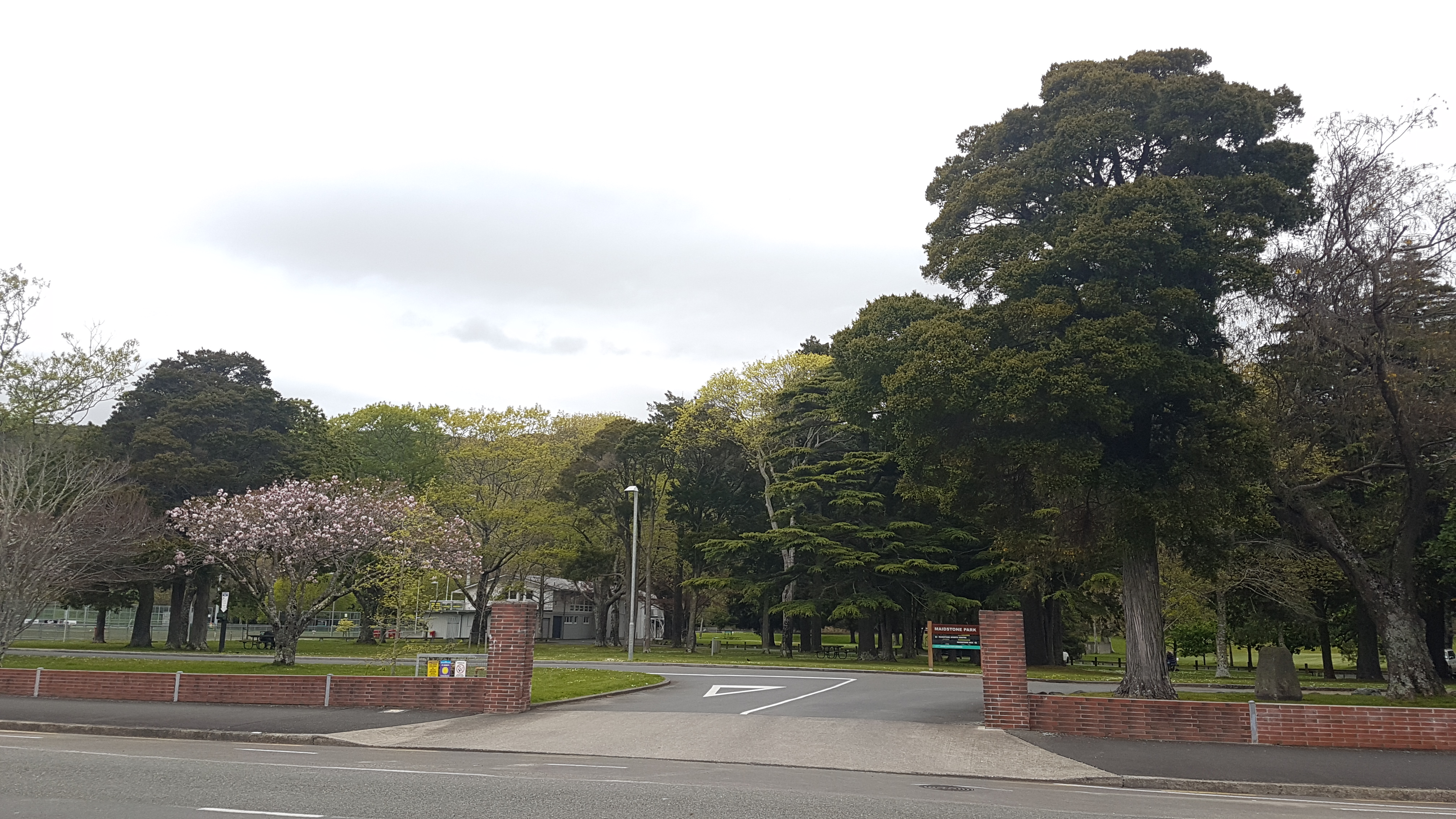
- Interactive map of Maidstone Park
- Full name: Maidstone Park
- Location: Upper Hutt, Wellington Region
- Coordinates: 41°7′33.79″S 175°4′34.56″E
- Owner: Upper Hutt City Council

Website
- Maidstone Park

Maidstone Park is a sports and recreation park located close to the centre of Upper Hutt in the Wellington Region of the North Island of New Zealand.

== History ==
The park was initially developed in 1908 by Philip Davis, as a private picnic area covering 32 ha (80 acres). By 1911, the park was being promoted as an easily accessible destination for outdoor recreation including children's activities and athletics. After leasing the park from Davis, in 1938, Upper Hutt Borough Council committed to raising a loan to purchase the park, for £6,000.

In 1945, it was proposed that a swimming pool be constructed at Maidstone Park as a war memorial project. There were prolonged delays in obtaining funding and developing the project, but the War Memorial Swimming Baths were eventually opened on 13 December 1958. After operating for around 38 years, the pool was demolished when a replacement pool complex (now known as H2O Xtream), was developed on another site near the centre of Upper Hutt City in 1996. In 1999, approval was given for the development of a children's adventure playground on the land formerly occupied by the Maidstone Memorial Pool complex.

A skate park branded as Maidstone Max was opened in April 2001.

Further development work completed in 2013 included two artificial turfs; a sand and rubber based pitch for association football and rugby, and a sand carpet pitch for hockey and another sand and rubber based pitch, for rugby and soccer.

In 2021, the council completed a $3.8 million upgrade of the Maidstone Max adventure playground and skate park. The existing facilities were almost totally replaced, and made more accessible for wheelchair users. A half basketball court was also included.

== Facilities ==
Facilities at the park now include two sand carpet sportfields for senior rugby and three smaller sand carpet fields for junior rugby. The park also includes a large children's playground, a skate park, a mountain bike track, and bush trails.

Upper Hutt City FC also use Maidstone Park as their home ground with their club rooms based in front of the turf.

== Cricket ==
A single List A match was held there during the 1978/79 Gillette Cup when Wellington played Canterbury, which resulted in a 4 wicket victory by Canterbury. The following season a first-class match was held there between Wellington and Central Districts in the 1979/80 Shell Trophy, which resulted in an innings and 45 runs victory for Wellington.

== Te Kupenga o Rongomai – Maidstone Sports Hub ==
A new community sports hub facility was opened at Maidstone Park in March 2024. The project was funded with support from central government as part of economic development expenditure in response to the COVID-19 pandemic. Government funding was announced in July 2020, and work began on–site in February 2022. The project involved a major redevelopment of existing facilities, including demolition of old clubrooms, and construction of a new indoor training facility and new shared clubrooms. The name Te Kupenga o Rongomai was gifted for the new facility by the iwi Te Āti Awa. The name Te Kupenga means a fishing net and refers to the outreach of the sports hub into the community. The new facility was opened on 13 March 2024.

== Miniature railway ==
A group of model railway enthusiasts identified a possible site for a miniature railway at Maidstone Park early in 1967, and obtained consent from the council. The Maidstone Model Engineering Society was formed and incorporated in June 1967, with funding and construction support for the project to be provided by the Upper Hutt Lions Club. Construction began in November 1967 and the track was completed in July 1968. The facility was officially opened by the Minister of Railways, Peter Gordon, on 4 October 1969.
