= Keith Hay Park =

Public park in Auckland, New Zealand

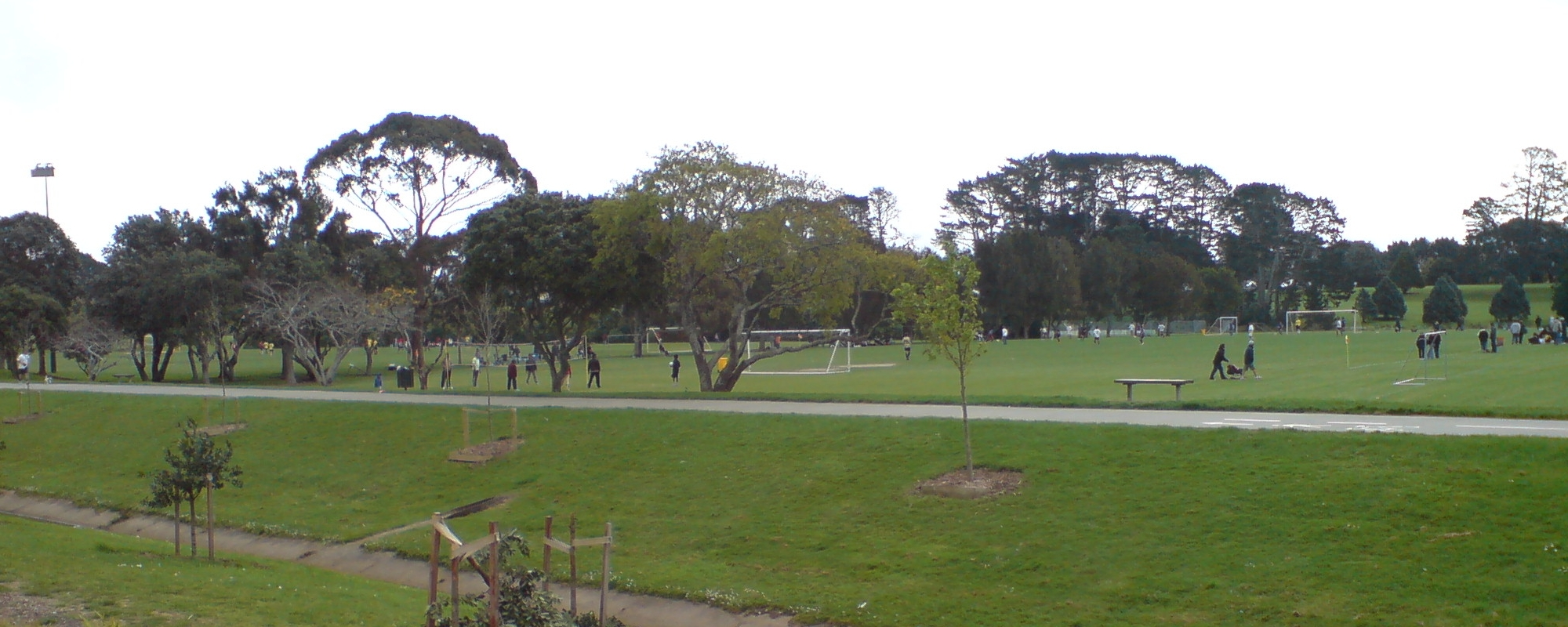
- Interactive map of Keith Hay Park
- Type: Urban park
- Location: 63 Arundel Street, Mount Roskill, Auckland
- Coordinates: 36°54′58.6″S 174°44′31.7″E
- Operator: Auckland Council
- Website: Auckland Council

Keith Hay Park is a reserve and sports ground in the suburb of Mount Roskill in Auckland, New Zealand.

It is the home ground of New Zealand National League and Northern League side Auckland United and the Tri Star Gymnastics Club.

Cameron Pools and Leisure Centre is also located at Keith Hay Park. The ground also hosts cricket games during the summer and is used as one of Eden Roskill Cricket Club's grounds.

== Naming ==
Keith Hay Park was named after Keith Hay, a former mayor of the Mt Roskill Borough Council, who developed the surrounding land.

== History ==
Developed on old swampy land, in 1879 Keith Hay Park was described as "cleared, beautifully undulating country dotted with picturesque homesteads and sheening in emerald green with the verdure of luxuriant crops".

In 2014, landscaping, footpath installation and an additional 7,000 square metres (75,000 sq ft) of carparking, was completed to accommodate growth of the surrounding community.

In January 2020, Watercare began construction on a Central Interceptor site in Keith Hay Park.

In September 2022, it was announced by FIFA that Keith Hay Park was shortlisted to be a team base camp for the 2023 FIFA Women's World Cup. On 12 December 2022, it was announced that New Zealand would use Keith Hay Park as their training ground during the world cup.

== Features ==
Keith Hay Park's main carpark is situated off Arundel Street, and two smaller carparks are accessed from Rainford Street and Noton Road.

A playground, accessible toilets and a basketball half-court are accessed from the Arundel Street carpark.

Auckland United FC have clubrooms and fields in the park.

== International football ==
Keith Hay Park has hosted one international match between New Zealand Women and Italy Women. This was a friendly game in the build up to the 2023 FIFA Women's World Cup held in New Zealand.

14 July 2023 Friendly	New Zealand Women	0–1	Italy Women	Auckland, New Zealand
		Report	Giacinti 23'	Stadium: Keith Hay Park; Attendance: 0 (behind closed doors)
