= Shepherds Park =

Football stadium in New Zealand

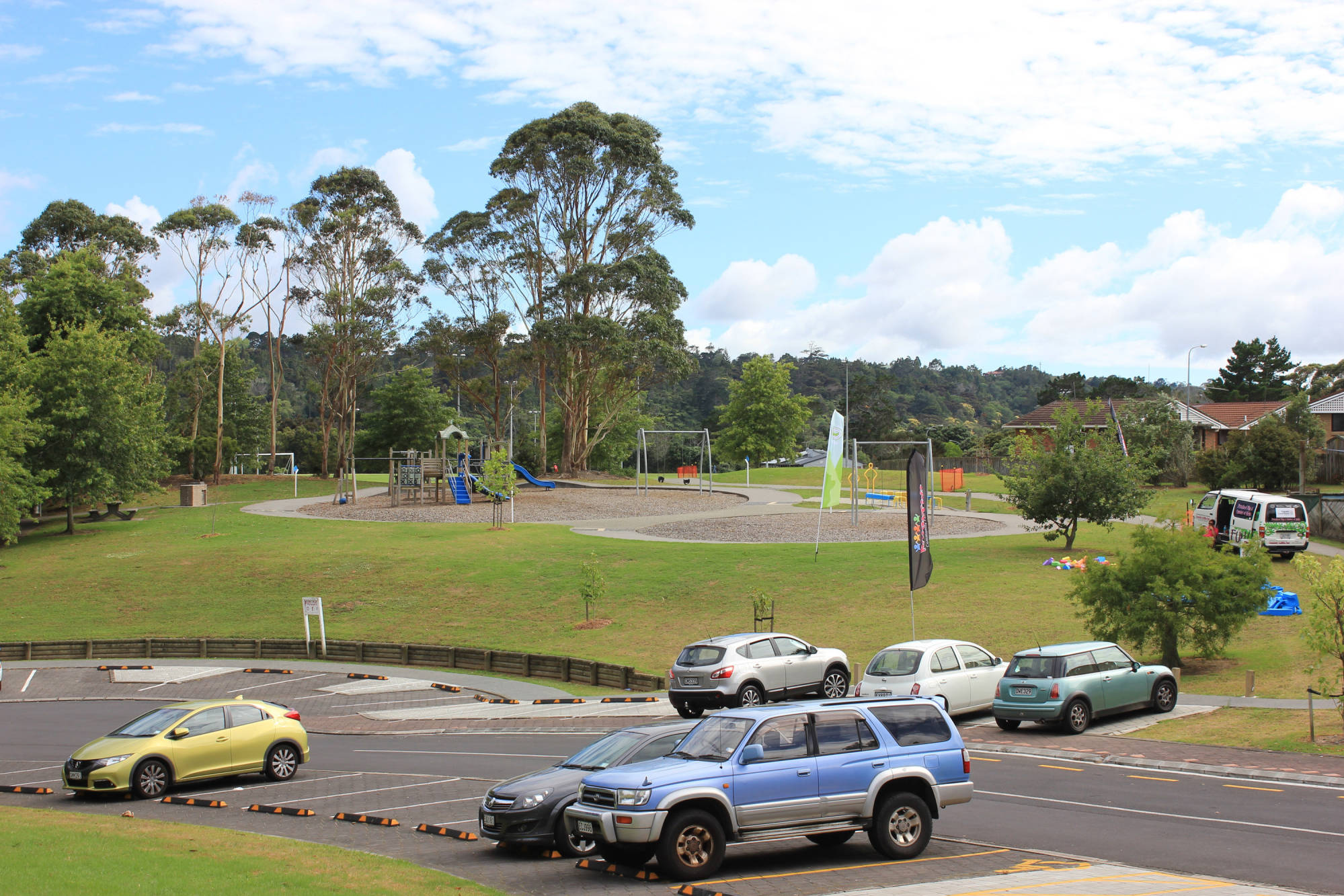
- Shepherds Park playground
- Interactive map of Shepherds Park
- Type: Urban park
- Location: 31-35 Cresta Avenue, Beach Haven, Auckland
- Coordinates: 36°47′16.1″S 174°41′19.3″E
- Created: 1947
- Operator: Auckland Council
- Website: Auckland Council

Shepherds Park, is a reserve and sports ground in the suburb of Beach Haven in Auckland, New Zealand. It is the home ground of New Zealand National League and Northern League side Birkenhead United, Beach Haven Bowling Club, Beach Haven Tennis Club, Shepherds Park Squash Club. It is also the home for Beach Haven Community House and Beach Haven Kauri Kids.

The park features areas of regenerating native bush. The Friends of Shepherds Park is a community group that have been coming together for over 30 years for native plant regeneration and maintenance in the park.

Shepherds Park also hosts cricket games during the summer and is used as one of Birkenhead City Cricket Club's grounds.

== History ==
Māori archaeological middens have been found at Shepherds Park, along the shores of Oruamo or Hellyers Creek.

Shepherd Parks was created from four farms and named after the Shepherd family who lived and farmed there for several generations. More about the history can be read in the booklet Shepherds Park: Roots to Skyline which was published by Friends of Shepherds Park in 2024.

In September 2022, Birkenhead United started the upgrades of their club rooms worth around NZD$2.5 million.

Also in September 2022, Shepherds Park were shortlisted by FIFA to be a team base camp for the 2023 FIFA Women's World Cup. On 12 December 2022, it was announced Shepherds Park would be used as the training ground by Italy during the world cup.
