= 2022 Women's South Island League (New Zealand) =

South Island Championship
- Season: 2022
- Dates: 16 July 2022 - 7 August 2022
- Champions: Coastal Spirit SAS
- Matches: 6
- Goals: 39 (6.5 per match)
- Top goalscorer: Isla McPherson (4 goals)
- Biggest home win: Cashmere Technical 9–1 Roslyn-Wakari (24 July 2022)
- Biggest away win: Roslyn-Wakari 0–7 Coastal Spirit SAS (24 July 2022)
- Highest scoring: Cashmere Technical 9–1 Roslyn-Wakari (31 July 2022)
- Longest winning run: Coastal Spirit SAS (3 matches)
- Longest unbeaten run: Coastal Spirit SAS (3 matches)
- Longest winless run: Roslyn-Wakari (3 matches)
- Longest losing run: Roslyn-Wakari (3 matches)

The 2022 Women's South Island Championship, known now as Women's South Island League, was the inaugural season of the 2nd level women's football in New Zealand.

Coastal Spirit SAS were the Mainland Women's Premiership champions and Dunedin City Royals were the ODT Women's Premiership champions.

The South Island Championship is the culmination of two regional federations, each of which provide teams to the Women's South Island Championship. The top two teams in the Women's Premier League and top two teams from the Women's Southern Premiership qualify for entry into the South Island League.

== Qualifying League ==
=== Mainland Women's Premier League ===
==== Teams ====
There are four team competing in the Premier League, down from the previous season's six. The teams which were relegated at the end of the previous season were Waimakariri United and Ferrymead Bays.

Team	Home ground	Location	2021 Season
Cashmere Technical	Garrick Memorial Park	Woolston, Christchurch	2nd
Coastal Spirit SAS	English Park	St Albans, Christchurch	1st
Nomads United	Tulett Park	Casebrook, Christchurch	6th
University of Canterbury	English Park	St Albans, Christchurch	3rd

==== Table ====
Pos	Team	Pld	W	D	L	GF	GA	GD	Pts	Qualification
1	Coastal Spirit SAS (C, Q)	9	9	0	0	43	4	+39	27	Winner of Women's Premier League and qualification to South Island Championship
2	Cashmere Technical (Q)	8	5	0	3	32	16	+16	15	Qualification to South Island Championship
3	University of Canterbury	8	1	2	5	6	41	−35	5	
4	Nomads United	9	0	2	7	9	29	−20	2	

Source: Yellow Fever
Rules for classification: 1) Points; 2) Head to head
(C) Champions; (Q) Qualified for the phase indicated

==== Result Table ====
Home \ Away	CT	CS	NU	UC	CT	CS	NU	UC
Cashmere Technical		1–7	5–0	7–3			7–1	5–0
Coastal Spirit SAS	4–2		5–1	5–0	1–0			
Nomads United	0–5	0–8		3–3		0–5		1–1
University of Canterbury	DNP (Note: Postponed due to Covid; game was never played)	0–4	2–0			0–4		

Source: Yellow Fever
Legend: Blue = home team win; Yellow = draw; Red = away team win.

==== League top scorers ====
Rank	Player	Club	Goals
1	Melanie Cameron	Coastal Spirit SAS	15
2	Nicola Dominikovich	Cashmere Technical	8
3	Frankie Morrow	Total; University of Canterbury; Coastal Spirit SAS	7; 5; 2
4	Jonelle Arthur	Cashmere Technical	5
4	Lauren Dabner	Coastal Spirit SAS	5
4	Rebecca Lake	Coastal Spirit SAS	5
7	Jess Dyer	Cashmere Technical	4
7	Emmer Kench	Cashmere Technical	4
7	Jayda Stewart	Coastal Spirit SAS	4

==== League hat-tricks ====
Round	Player	For	Against	Home/Away	Result	Date
1	Melanie Cameron (Note: Player scored 4 goals)	Coastal Spirit SAS	Nomads United	Away	0–8	2 April 2022
1	Emma Kench	Cashmere Technical	University of Canterbury	Home	7–3	2 April 2022
4	Melanie Cameron	Coastal Spirit SAS	Nomads United	Home	5–1	7 May 2022
6	Melanie Cameron	Coastal Spirit SAS	Cashmere Technical	Away	1–7	28 May 2022
7	Nicola Dominikovich	Cashmere Technical	University of Canterbury	Home	5–0	11 June 2022
8	Jess Dyer	Cashmere Technical	Nomads United	Home	7–1	25 June 2022

==== Own goal ====
Round	Player	Club	Against
8	Emily Lambie	Nomads United	Cashmere Technical

=== ODT Women's Southern Premiership ===
==== Teams ====
Seven teams competed in the league: five from the previous season, and two new teams, Dunedin City Royals and Northern. Dunedin City Royals were formed as an amalgamation of Dunedin Technical and Caversham, and replaced Dunedin Technical in the league.

Team	Home ground	Location
Dunedin City Royals	Logan Park	Dunedin North, Dunedin
Green Island	Sunnyvale Park	Green Island, Dunedin
Mosgiel	Memorial Park Ground	Mosgiel
Northern	Forrester Park	Normanby, Dunedin
Otago University	Logan Park	Dunedin North, Dunedin
Queenstown Rovers	Queenstown Events Centre	Frankton, Queenstown
Roslyn-Wakari	Ellis Park	Glenross, Dunedin

==== Table ====
Pos	Team	Pld	W	D	L	GF	GA	GD	Pts	Qualification
1	Dunedin City Royals (C, Q)	11	11	0	0	86	1	+85	33	Winner of Women's Southern Premiership and qualification to South Island Championship
2	Roslyn-Wakari (Q)	12	8	1	3	48	16	+32	25	Qualification to South Island Championship
3	Otago University	12	8	0	4	47	21	+26	24	
4	Queenstown	11	7	1	3	28	23	+5	22	
5	Green Island	12	4	0	8	14	36	−22	12	
6	Northern	12	1	0	11	5	64	−59	3	
7	Mosgiel	12	1	0	11	3	70	−67	3	

Rules for classification: 1) Points; 2) Goal difference; 3) Goals scored; 4) Goals against; 5) Head to head; 6) Disciplinary record; 7) Coin toss
(C) Champions; (Q) Qualified for the phase indicated

==== Results Table ====
Home \ Away	DC	GI	MO	NO	OU	QU	RW
Dunedin City Royals		6–0	6–0	10–0	3–0	7–0	4–0
Green Island	0–10		3–0	2–0	2–7	0–1	1–2
Mosgiel	0–15	1–2		1–0	0–10	0–2	0–4
Northern	1–12	1–2	1–0		0–10	0–6	0–10
Otago University	0–8	1–0	11–0	3–0		2–1	2–1
Queenstown	DNP (Note: Game got cancelled, Likely due to Kate Sheppard Cup fixture for Dunedin City Royals, unsure if game was ever played, likely not.)	3–1	3–0	2–1	3–1		2–2
Roslyn-Wakari	0–5	4–1	12–0	6–1	3–0 (Note: Otago University Defaulted, Roslyn-Wakari won 3–0 by default.)	4–0	

Source: Yellow Fever
Legend: Blue = home team win; Yellow = draw; Red = away team win.

==== League top scorers ====
Rank	Player	Club	Goals
1	Amy Hislop	Otago University	19
1	Jasmine Prince	Roslyn-Wakari	19
3	Chelsea Whittaker	Dunedin City Royals	18
4	Jessica Fuller	Otago University	14
5	Margarida Dias	Dunedin City Royals	13
5	Emily Morison	Dunedin City Royals	13
7	Nieve Collin	Dunedin City Royals	11
7	Holly White	Roslyn-Wakari	11
9	Shontelle Smite	Dunedin City Royals	9
10	Danielle Anderson	Queenstown	8

==== League hat-tricks ====
Round	Player	For	Against	Home/Away	Result	Date
1	Chelsea Whittaker (Note: Player scored 4 goals)	Dunedin City Royals	Green Island	Home	6–0	26 March 2022
1	Jasmine Prince	Roslyn-Wakari	Northern	Away	0–10	26 March 2022
1	Holly White	Roslyn-Wakari	Northern	Away	0–10	26 March 2022
2	Amy Hislop (Note: Player scored 7 goals)	Otago University	Mosgiel	Home	11–0	2 April 2022
3	Amy Hislop (Note: Player scored 6 goals)	Otago University	Northern	Away	0–10	9 April 2022
4	Emily Morison (Note: Player scored 5 goals)	Dunedin City Royals	Northern	Away	1–12	13 April 2022
4	Chelsea Whittaker	Dunedin City Royals	Northern	Away	1–12	13 April 2022
5	Jasmine Prince	Roslyn-Wakari	Mosgiel	Home	12–0	26 April 2022
6	Margarida Dias	Dunedin City Royals	Mosgiel	Away	0–15	30 April 2022
6	Nieve Collin	Dunedin City Royals	Mosgiel	Away	0–15	30 April 2022
6	Emily Morison	Dunedin City Royals	Mosgiel	Away	0–15	30 April 2022
7	Chelsea Whittaker	Dunedin City Royals	Queenstown	Home	7–0	7 May 2022
7	Amy Hislop	Otago University	Green Island	Away	2–7	7 May 2022
8	Jasmine Prince	Roslyn-Wakari	Northern	Home	6–1	21 May 2022
9	Jessica Fuller (Note: Player scored 8 goals)	Otago University	Mosgiel	Away	0–10	28 May 2022
10	Holly White	Roslyn-Wakari	Otago University	Home	4–0	4 June 2022
11	Shontelle Smith	Dunedin City Royals	Northern	Home	10–0	11 June 2022
11	Nieve Collin	Dunedin City Royals	Northern	Home	10–0	11 June 2022
12	Danielle Anderson	Queenstown	Mosgiel	Home	3–0	18 June 2022
13	Lauren Murry	Queenstown	Northern	Away	0–6	25 June 2022
14	Danielle Anderson	Queenstown	Otago University	Home	3–1	9 July 2022

==== Own goals ====
Round	Player	Club	Against
3	Laura Wallis	Queenstown	Roslyn-Wakari
3	Gracie Va'afusuaga	Green Island	Mosgiel
4	Claire Jones	Queenstown	Otago University
7	A. Parlane (Note: Unable to find players first name)	Otago University	Green Island
7	Lauren Paterson	Green Island	Otago University
8	Lili Clouston-Cain	Green Island	Dunedin City Royals
14	Player Unknown (Note: Unable to find player's name)	Northern	Green Island

== South Island Championship ==
=== Teams ===
Association	Team	Position in regional league	App (last)	Previous best (last)
Mainland Football (2 berths)	Coastal Spirit SAS	1st	1st	Debut
Mainland Football (2 berths)	Cashmere Technical	2nd	1st	Debut
Southern Football (2 berths)	Dunedin City Royals	1st	1st	Debut
Southern Football (2 berths)	Roslyn-Wakari	2nd	1st	Debut

=== Table ===
Pos	Team	Pld	W	D	L	GF	GA	GD	Pts	Qualification
1	Coastal Spirit SAS (C)	3	3	0	0	13	1	+12	9	Winner of Women's South Island League
2	Dunedin City Royals	3	2	0	1	5	5	0	6	
3	Cashmere Technical	3	1	0	2	11	7	+4	3	
4	Roslyn-Wakari	3	0	0	3	2	18	−16	0	

Source: Yellow Fever
Rules for classification: 1) Points; 2) Goal difference; 3) Goals scored; 4) Goals against; 5) Head to head; 6) Disciplinary record; 7) Coin toss
(C) Champions

=== Results Table ===
Home \ Away	CT	CS	DC	RW
Cashmere Technical				9–1
Coastal Spirit SAS	3–1		3–0	
Dunedin City Royals	3–1			2–1
Roslyn-Wakari		0–7		

Source: Yellow Fever
Legend: Blue = home team win; Yellow = draw; Red = away team win.

== Finals ==
=== Third Place Playoff ===
7 August 2022
10:45 NZST (UTC+12:00)

Cashmere Technical	2–1	Roslyn-Wakari
L. Evans 28'; C. Wilson 84'		A. Newlands 76'

English Park, Christchurch

=== Final ===
7 August 2022
13:00 NZST (UTC+12:00)

Coastal Spirit SAS	4–1	Dunedin City Royals
M. Cameron 40', 90+1'; L. Dabner 51'; W. Hepburn 87'		C. Whittaker 29'

English Park, Christchurch

== League scoring ==
As of Completed

=== League top scorers ===
Rank	Player	Club	Goals
1	Isla McPherson	Coastal Spirit SAS	4
2	Jonelle Arthur	Cashmere Technical	3
2	Mel Cameron	Coastal Spirit SAS	3
2	Aimee Phillips	Cashmere Technical	3
5	Leigh Alexander	Cashmere Technical	2
5	Lauren Dabner	Coastal Spirit SAS	2
5	Marga Dias	Dunedin City Royals	2
5	Lisa Evans	Cashmere Technical	2
5	Whitney Hepburn	Coastal Spirit SAS	2
5	Kate Loye	Cashmere Technical	2
5	Laura Newman	Coastal Spirit SAS	2
5	Bel van Noorden	Coastal Spirit SAS	2
5	Chelsea Whittaker	Dunedin City Royals	2

=== League hat-tricks ===
Round	Player	For	Against	Home/Away	Result	Date
3	Jonelle Arthur	Cashmere Technical	Roslyn-Wakari	Home	9–1	31 July 2022
