= 2024 Women's South Island League (New Zealand) =

South Island League
- Season: 2024
- Dates: 22 June 2024 - 8 September 2024
- Champions: Cashmere Technical
- Matches: 30
- Goals: 121 (4.03 per match)
- Top goalscorer: Anna McPhie (9 goals)
- Biggest home win: Cashmere Technical 10–0 Roslyn Wakari (29 June 2024)
- Biggest away win: Roslyn Wakari 0–11 Cashmere Technical (18 August 2024)
- Highest scoring: Cashmere Technical 10–1 Nelson Suburbs (13 July 2024); Roslyn Wakari 0–11 Cashmere Technical (18 August 2024)
- Longest winning run: 4 match Dunedin City Royals
- Longest unbeaten run: 9 match Dunedin City Royals
- Longest winless run: 10 match Nelson Suburbs
- Longest losing run: 8 match Nelson Suburbs

The 2024 Women's South Island League is the third season of the second level of women's football in New Zealand, and the second season under the name Women's South Island League.

Cashmere Technical were the 2023 Women's South Island champions, with Dunedin City Royals were runners-up. Cashmere Technical are the South Island Qualifying League champions and Dunedin City Royals are the Southern Qualifying League champions.

== Qualifying Leagues ==
=== South Island Qualifying League ===
South Island Qualifying League
- Season: 2024
- Dates: 6 April 2024 - 3 June 2024
- Champions: Cashmere Technical
- Matches: 21
- Goals: 102 (4.86 per match)
- Top goalscorer: Aimee Phillips (12 goals)
- Biggest home win: Cashmere Technical 14–1 Halswell United (27 April 2024)
- Biggest away win: Selwyn United 0–8 University of Canterbury (6 April 2024); University of Canterbury 0–8 Cashmere Technical (25 May 2024)
- Highest scoring: Cashmere Technical 14–1 Halswell United (27 April 2024)

The South Island Qualifying League is open to teams in the northern half of the South Island. The season starts on 6 April, and finishes on 25 May, being a single round. The league is to determine the top three teams in Mainland's federation, with the fourth-placed team playing in a playoff against the third-placed team in Southern Qualifying, who go on to play the top two teams from Southern Football. The bottom three or four teams will play in the Canterbury Women's Premiership, starting after this league finishes. They will be joined by the top three teams of Canterbury Women's Premiership Qualifying League.

Due to a flight cancelation, Selwyn United were unable to fly up to Nelson to play Nelson Suburbs, extending the season date by a week.

==== South Island Qualifying League teams ====
Seven team are competing in this league - six from the previous season and one new combined team. The new combined team is Nomads-Waimakariri United, who replace FC Nomads United. The six returning teams are Cashmere Technical, Coastal Spirit SAS, Halswell United, Nelson Suburbs, Selwyn United, and University of Canterbury. Nomads-Waimakariri United are a combined team of Nomads United and Waimakariri United, replacing the combined Nomads United/FC Twenty 11 team from the previous season. Halswell United are competing as a single club, rather than as the previously combined team of Halswell United and Christchurch United.

Team	Home ground	Location	Competition
Cashmere Technical	Garrick Memorial Park	Woolston, Christchurch	2nd South Island Qualifying League
Coastal Spirit SAS	English Park	St Albans, Christchurch	1st South Island Qualifying League
Halswell United	Halswell Domain	Halswell, Christchurch	7th South Island Qualifying League
Nelson Suburbs	Saxton Field	Stoke, Nelson	4th South Island Qualifying League
Nomads-Waimakariri United	Kendall Park	Kaiapoi, Canterbury	5th South Island Qualifying League (Note: Waimakariri United competed in the Canterbury Women's Championship League finishing 2nd place, while FC Nomads United finished 5th in the South Island Qualifying League.)
Selwyn United	Foster Park	Rollerston, Canterbury	6th South Island Qualifying League
University of Canterbury	English Park	St Albans, Christchurch	3rd South Island Qualifying League

==== South Island Qualifying League table ====
Pos	Team	Pld	W	D	L	GF	GA	GD	Pts	Qualification
1	Cashmere Technical (C)	6	6	0	0	44	1	+43	18	Champions and qualification to South Island League
2	Coastal Spirit SAS	6	3	2	1	13	6	+7	11	Qualification to South Island League
3	Nelson Suburbs	6	3	1	2	17	14	+3	10	Qualification to South Island League
4	University of Canterbury	6	3	1	2	16	14	+2	10	Qualification to South Island League Playoff
5	Nomads-Waimakariri United	6	2	0	4	5	15	−10	6	Qualification to Canterbury Women's Premiership
6	Halswell United	6	2	0	4	7	21	−14	6	Qualification to Canterbury Women's Premiership
7	Selwyn United	6	0	0	6	0	31	−31	0	Qualification to Canterbury Women's Premiership

Source: Mainland Football
Rules for classification: 1) Points; 2) Head to head; 3) Disciplinary record (1 Disciplinary Point for Yellow, 3 Disciplinary Points for Red); 4) Coin toss
(C) Champions

==== South Island Qualifying League results table ====
Home \ Away	CT	CS	HU	NS	NW	SU	UC
Cashmere Technical		3–0	14–1	5–0		7–0	
Coastal Spirit SAS			3–1	1–1		6–0	
Halswell United				1–2	3–0		
Nelson Suburbs					2–3	8–0	4–2
Nomads-Waimakariri United	0–7	0–2					1–3
Selwyn United			0–1		0–1		0–8
University of Canterbury	0–8	1–1	2–0				

Source: Mainland Football
Legend: Blue = home team win; Yellow = draw; Red = away team win.

==== South Island Qualifying League top scorers ====
As of 18 May 2024

Rank	Player	Club	Goals
1	Aimee Phillips	Cashmere Technical	12
2	Anna McPhie	Cashmere Technical	9
3	Katie Harris	University of Canterbury	7
4	Gillian Morgan	Nelson Suburbs	4
4	Laura Newman	Coastal Spirit SAS	4
4	Lara Wall	Cashmere Technical	4
7	Rachel Brodie	Halswell United	3
7	Melanie Cameron	Coastal Spirit SAS	3
7	Margarida Dias	Cashmere Technical	3
7	Emily Lauer	Nelson Suburbs	3
7	Samantha Whyte	Coastal Spirit SAS	3

==== South Island Qualifying League hat-tricks ====
Round	Player	For	Against	Home/Away	Result	Date
1	Katie Harris (Note: Player scored 5 goals)	University of Canterbury	Selwyn United	Away	0–8	6 April 2024
1	Aimee Phillips	Cashmere Technical	NW United	Away	0–7	6 April 2024
4	Aimee Phillips (Note: Player scored 6 goals)	Cashmere Technical	Halswell United	Home	14–1	28 April 2024
4	Anna McPhie (Note: Player scored 4 goals)	Cashmere Technical	Halswell United	Home	14–1	28 April 2024
4	Laura Newman	Coastal Spirit SAS	Selwyn United	Home	6–0	28 April 2024

==== South Island Qualifying League own goals ====
Round	Player	Club	H/A	Time	Goal	Result	Opponent	Date
1	Ashley McLean	Selwyn United	Home	27'	0–2	0–8	University of Canterbury	6 April 2024
2	Stella Dallimore	Nelson Suburbs	Home	87'	2–3	2–3	NW United	14 April 2024
6	Pip Coakley	Nelson Suburbs	Away	86'	5–0	5–0	Cashmere Technical	18 May 2024

=== SF Women's Southern Qualifying League ===
SF Women's Southern Qualifying League
- Season: 2024
- Dates: 6 April 2024 - 25 May 2024
- Champions: Dunedin City Royals
- Matches: 12
- Goals: 64 (5.33 per match)
- Top goalscorer: Abbey Neilson (6 goals)
- Biggest home win: Dunedin City Royals 10–0 Green Island (6 April 2024); Roslyn-Wakari 10–0 Green Island (25 May 2024)
- Biggest away win: Northern 0–10 Dunedin City Royals (4 May 2024)
- Highest scoring: Dunedin City Royals 10–0 Green Island (6 April 2024); Northern 0–10 Dunedin City Royals (4 May 2024); Roslyn-Wakari 10–0 Green Island (25 May 2024)

The SF Women's Southern Qualifying League is open to teams in the southern half of the South Island. The season starts on 6 April, and finishes on 25 May, being a single round. The league is to determine the top two teams in Southern's federation, who go on to play the top three teams from Mainland Football, with the third placed team playing in a playoff against the fourth placed team in the South Island Qualifying League. The bottom 3–4 teams will play in the ODT Women's Southern Championship.

==== Southern Qualifying League teams ====
Six teams are competing in the league - five teams from last year and one promoted team. The promoted team is Queens Park. They will be joined by the previous season's Dunedin City Royals, Green Island, Northern, Otago University, and Roslyn-Wakari. There are two team not returning, Mosgiel and Queenstown Rovers.

Team	Home ground	Location	Competition
Dunedin City Royals	Logan Park	Dunedin North, Dunedin	1st ODT Women's Southern Premiership
Green Island	Sunnyvale Park	Green Island, Dunedin	5th ODT Women's Southern Premiership
Northern	Forrester Park	Normanby, Dunedin	7th ODT Women's Southern Premiership
Otago University	Logan Park	Dunedin North, Dunedin	3rd ODT Women's Southern Premiership
Queens Park	Surrey Park	Glengarry, Invercargill	1st Kolk Cup Premier
Roslyn-Wakari	Ellis Park	Glenross, Dunedin	2nd ODT Women's Southern Premiership

==== Southern Qualifying League table ====
Pos	Team	Pld	W	D	L	GF	GA	GD	Pts	Qualification
1	Dunedin City Royals (C)	5	5	0	0	26	0	+26	15	Champions and qualification to South Island League
2	Otago University	5	4	0	1	13	4	+9	12	Qualification to South Island League
3	Roslyn-Wakari	5	3	0	2	23	4	+19	9	Qualification to South Island League Playoffs
4	Queens Park	5	2	0	3	8	11	−3	6	Qualification to Southern Football Women's Championship
5	Green Island	5	1	0	4	4	27	−23	3	Qualification to Southern Football Women's Championship
6	Northern	5	0	0	5	1	29	−28	0	Qualification to Southern Football Women's Championship

Source: Southern Football
Rules for classification: 1) Points; 2) Goal difference; 3) Goals scored; 4) Goals against; 5) Head to head; 6) Disciplinary record; 7) Coin toss
(C) Champions

==== Southern Qualifying League results table ====
Home \ Away	DC	GI	NO	OU	QP	RW
Dunedin City Royals		10–0			4–0	1–0
Green Island			4–1	0–5		
Northern	0–10					0–8
Otago University	0–1		2–0		3–2	
Queens Park		1–0	5–0			0–4
Roslyn-Wakari		10–0		1–3		

Source: Southern Football
Legend: Blue = home team win; Yellow = draw; Red = away team win.

==== SF Women's Southern Qualifying League top scorers ====
As of 25 May 2024

Rank	Player	Club	Goals
1	Abbey Neilson	Roslyn Wakari	6
2	Charlotte Summers	Dunedin City Royals	5
3	Emma Black	Roslyn Wakari	4
3	Nieve Collin	Dunedin City Royals	4
5	Tyler Andrews	Queens Park	3
5	Hannah Hargest	Roslyn Wakari	3
5	Georgia Kennedy	Dunedin City Royals	3
5	Hannah MacKay-Wright	Dunedin City Royals	3
5	Charli Marvin	Otago University	3
5	Zara Pratley	Roslyn Wakari	3
5	Rebecca Walker	Queens Park	3

==== SF Women's Southern Qualifying League hat-tricks ====
Round	Player	For	Against	Home/Away	Result	Date
1	Hannah Hargest	Roslyn Wakari	Queens Park	Away	0–4	6 April 2024
3	Emma Black (Note: Player scored 4 goals)	Roslyn Wakari	Northern	Away	0–8	20 April 2024
5	Charlotte Summers	Dunedin City Royals	Northern	Away	0–10	4 May 2024
7	Abbey Neilson	Roslyn Wakari	Green Island	Home	10–0	25 May 2024

==== SF Women's Southern Qualifying League own-goals ====
Round	Player	Club	H/A	Time	Goal	Result	Opponent	Date
4	Katrina Young	Northern	Away	40'	3–1	4–1	Green Island	27 April 2024
6	Ashlynn Scherp	Queens Park	Away	22'	1–0	4–0	Dunedin City Royals	18 May 2024
7	Kyla Porteous	Green Island	Away	85'	10–0	10–0	Roslyn Wakari	25 May 2024

== South Island League play-offs ==
The South Island League play-offs was a one legged match that took place on 8 June 2024.

Overview

Team 1	Score	Team 2
Roslyn Wakari	1–0	University of Canterbury

Matches

8 June 2024	Roslyn Wakari	1–0	University of Canterbury	Aorangi Park, Timaru
13:30	Body 90+5'

== South Island League ==
The South Island League is the culmination of the two regional leagues, each of which provide teams to the Women's South Island League. The top three teams in the South Island Qualifying League and top two teams from the SF Women's Southern Qualifying League qualify for entry into the South Island League, along with the winner of a playoff between the next placed team in each regional league.

=== Qualified Teams ===
This year, Cashmere Technical, Coastal Spirit SAS, Dunedin City Royals, Nelson Suburbs and Otago University are back in the league. Joining them will be Roslyn Wakari from Southern Football after not making the qualification in 2023, with each team has a home and away tie against each other. University of Canterbury from Mainland Football did not qualify after qualifying in 2023.

Association	Team	Position in Regional League	App (last)	Previous best (last)
Mainland Football (3 berths)	Cashmere Technical	1st	2nd (2023)	1st (2023)
Mainland Football (3 berths)	Coastal Spirit SAS	2nd	2nd (2023)	3rd (2023)
Mainland Football (3 berths)	Nelson Suburbs	3rd	2nd (2023)	6th (2023)
Southern Football (2 berths)	Dunedin City Royals	1st	2nd (2023)	2nd (2023)
Southern Football (2 berths)	Otago University	2nd	2nd (2023)	4th (2023)
Playoff winners (1 berth)	Roslyn-Wakari	3rd	1st	Debut

=== South Island League table ===
Pos	Team	Pld	W	D	L	GF	GA	GD	Pts	Qualification
1	Cashmere Technical (C)	10	8	1	1	49	6	+43	25	Winner of Women's South Island League
2	Dunedin City Royals	10	8	1	1	25	4	+21	25	
3	Coastal Spirit SAS	10	6	1	3	25	14	+11	19	
4	Otago University	10	3	2	5	12	17	−5	11	
5	Roslyn-Wakari	10	1	2	7	5	41	−36	5	
6	Nelson Suburbs	10	0	1	9	5	39	−34	1	

Source: Mainland Football
Rules for classification: 1) Points; 2) Goal difference; 3) Goals scored; 4) Goals against; 5) Head to head; 6) Disciplinary record; 7) Coin toss
(C) Champions

=== South Island League results table ===
Home \ Away	CT	CS	DC	NS	OU	RW
Cashmere Technical		4–2	1–1	10–1	3–0	10–0
Coastal Spirit SAS	2–1		1–3	3–0	2–0	3–0
Dunedin City Royals	0–1	2–0		2–1	4–0	3–0
Nelson Suburbs	0–5	1–4	0–5		0–2	1–2
Otago University	0–3	2–2	0–2	5–0		1–1
Roslyn-Wakari	0–11	1–6	0–3	1–1	0–2	

Updated to match(es) played on 21 August 2024. Source: Mainland Football
Legend: Blue = home team win; Yellow = draw; Red = away team win.

==== South Island League scoring ====
As of 8 September 2024

==== South Island League top scorers ====
Rank	Player	Club	Goals
1	Anna McPhie	Cashmere Technical	9
2	Melanie Cameron	Coastal Spirit SAS	8
2	Margarida Dias	Cashmere Technical	8
4	Annalie Longo	Cashmere Technical	7
4	Lara Wall	Cashmere Technical	7
6	Rose Morton	Dunedin City Royals	6
7	Emma Kench	Cashmere Technical	4
8	Whitney Hepburn	Coastal Spirit SAS	3
8	Georgia Kennedy	Dunedin City Royals	3
8	Holly Lyon	Coastal Spirit SAS	3
8	Hannah Mackay-Wright	Dunedin City Royals	3
8	Aynsley Martin	Otago University	3
8	Britney-Lee Nicholson	Coastal Spirit SAS	3
8	Raegan Potter	Dunedin City Royals	3
8	Shontelle Smith	Dunedin City Royals	3
8	Bel van Noorden	Coastal Spirit SAS	3

==== South Island League hat-tricks ====
Round	Player	For	Against	Home/Away	Result	Date
3	Emma Kench (Note: Player scored 4 goals)	Cashmere Technical	Nelson Suburbs	Home	10–1	13 July 2024
5	Whitney Hepburn	Coastal Spirit SAS	Roslyn Wakari	Away	1–6	27 July 2024
7	Annalie Longo	Cashmere Technical	Roslyn Wakari	Away	0–11	18 August 2024
7	Lara Wall	Cashmere Technical	Roslyn Wakari	Away	0–11	18 August 2024

==== South Island League own-goals ====
Round	Player	Club	H/A	Time	Goal	Result	Opponent	Date
2	Freya des Fountain	Roslyn Wakari	Away	28'	4–0	10–0	Cashmere Technical	29 June 2024
4	Amelie East Giles	Roslyn Wakari	Away	45+1'	1–1	1–1	Otago University	21 July 2024
4	Yui Ishikawa	Roslyn Wakari	Home	70'	0–9	0–11	Cashmere Technical	18 August 2024
10	Gabrielle Walton	Nelson Suburbs	Away	22'	1–0	5–0	Otago University	31 August 2024
