= 2023 Women's South Island League (New Zealand) =

South Island League
- Season: 2023
- Dates: 10 June 2023 - 2 September 2023
- Champions: Cashmere Technical
- Matches: 29
- Goals: 131 (4.52 per match)
- Top goalscorer: Britney-Lee Nicholson (15 goals)
- Biggest home win: Coastal Spirit SAS 8–0 Nelson Suburbs (19 August 2023)
- Biggest away win: Otago University 0–6 Cashmere Technical (1 July 2023)
- Highest scoring: Coastal Spirit SAS 8–0 Nelson Suburbs (19 August 2023)
- Longest winning run: Cashmere Technical (6 matches)
- Longest unbeaten run: Cashmere Technical (10 matches)
- Longest winless run: Nelson Suburbs (10 matches)
- Longest losing run: Nelson Suburbs (8 matches)
- All statistics correct as of 2 September 2023.

The 2023 Women's South Island League, is the 2nd season of the 2nd level women's football in New Zealand and the 1st season under the name Women's South Island League.

Coastal Spirit SAS are the South Island Qualifying League, known as Mainland Women's Premiership, champions and the 2022 Women's South Island Championship champions and Dunedin City Royals are the FS Women's Premiership champions, Women's South Island League Playoff winners and 2022 Women's South Island Championship runners up.

The South Island League is the culmination of two regional federations, each of which provide teams to the Women's South Island League. The top four teams in the Women's Premier League and top two teams from the Women's Southern Premiership qualify for entry into the South Island League.

== Qualifying League ==
=== South Island Qualifying League ===
South Island Qualifying League
- Season: 2023
- Dates: 1 April 2023 - 28 May 2023
- Champions: Coastal Spirit SAS
- Matches: 28
- Goals: 112 (4 per match)
- Top goalscorer: Britney-Lee Nicholson (15 goals)
- Biggest home win: Coastal Spirit SAS 12–0 Haswell Christchurch United (29 April 2023)
- Biggest away win: Selwyn United 0–20 Coastal Spirit SAS (6 May 2023)
- Highest scoring: Selwyn United 0–20 Coastal Spirit (6 May 2023)
- Longest winning run: Coastal Spirit SAS (5 matches)
- Longest unbeaten run: Coastal Spirit SAS (6 matches)
- Longest winless run: Halswell Christchurch United (5 matches)
- Longest losing run: Halswell Christchurch United (6 matches)
- All statistics correct as of Completed.

The season started on 1 April, and finished on 28 May, being a single round. The league determined the top four teams in Mainland's federation, who went on to play the top two teams from Southern Football. The bottom three teams played in the Canterbury Women's Premiership, starting after this league finished, and were joined by the top three teams of Canterbury Women's Championship Division 1.

==== Team ====
The four teams from the 2022 league - Cashmere Technical, Coastal Spirit SAS, FC Nomads United and University of Canterbury - were joined by Halswell Christchurch United, Nelson Suburbs, and Selwyn United. Halswell Christchurch United were a combined team of Halswell United and Christchurch United; similarly FC Nomads United was a combined team from Nomads United and FC Twenty 11.

Team	Home ground	Location	Competition
Cashmere Technical	Garrick Memorial Park	Woolston, Christchurch	2nd Mainland Women's Premier League
Coastal Spirit SAS	English Park	St Albans, Christchurch	1st Mainland Women's Premier League
Halswell Christchurch United	United Sports Centre	Spreydon, Christchurch	
Nelson Suburbs	Saxton Field	Stoke, Nelson	
FC Nomads United WPL	Tulett Park	Casebrook, Christchurch	4th Mainland Women's Premier League
Selwyn United WPL	Foster Park	Rolleston	
University of Canterbury	English Park	St Albans, Christchurch	3rd Mainland Women's Premier League

==== Table ====
Pos	Team	Pld	W	D	L	GF	GA	GD	Pts	Qualification
1	Coastal Spirit SAS (C, Q)	6	5	1	0	42	2	+40	16	Winner of South Island Qualifying League and qualification to South Island League
2	Cashmere Technical (Q)	6	4	1	1	25	5	+20	13	Qualification to South Island League
3	University of Canterbury (Q)	6	3	1	2	10	8	+2	10	Qualification to South Island League
4	Nelson Suburbs (Q)	6	3	0	3	12	11	+1	9	Qualification to South Island League
5	FC Nomads United	6	2	0	4	8	9	−1	6	Qualification to Canterbury Women's Premiership
6	Selwyn United	6	2	0	4	5	43	−38	6	Qualification to Canterbury Women's Premiership
7	Halswell Christchurch United	6	0	1	5	4	28	−24	1	Qualification to Canterbury Women's Premiership

Source: Mainland Football
Rules for classification: 1) Points; 2) Head to head
(C) Champions; (Q) Qualified for the phase indicated

==== Result Table ====
Home \ Away	CT	CS	HC	NS	NU	SU	UC
Cashmere Technical		1–1	5–0		1–2		3–0
Coastal Spirit SAS			12–0				3–0
Halswell Christchurch United						2–3	2–2
Nelson Suburbs	2–3	1–3	2–0		3–2		
FC Nomads United		0–3	4–0			0–1	
Selwyn United	0–12	0–20		1–4			
University of Canterbury				2–0	1–0	5–0	

Source: Mainland Football
Legend: Blue = home team win; Yellow = draw; Red = away team win.

==== League top scorers ====
Rank	Player	Club	Goals
1	Britney-Lee Nicholson	Coastal Spirit SAS	15
2	Melanie Cameron	Coastal Spirit SAS	6
3	Aimee Phillips	Cashmere Technical	5
3	Whitney Hepburn	Coastal Spirit SAS	5
5	Charlotte Mortlock	Cashmere Technical	4
5	Jasmine Barney	Nelson Suburbs	4
5	Laura Newman	Coastal Spirit SAS	4
5	Lauren Dabner	Coastal Spirit SAS	4
5	Nicola Dominikovich	Cashmere Technical	4
10	Leanna Ryan	Cashmere Technical	3

==== League hat-tricks ====
Round	Player	For	Against	Home/Away	Result	Date
1	Aimee Phillips	Cashmere Technical	Selwyn United	Away	0–12	1 April 2023
1	Charlotte Mortlock	Cashmere Technical	Selwyn United	Away	0–12	1 April 2023
4	Laura Newman	Coastal Spirit SAS	Halswell Christchurch United	Home	12–0	29 April 2023
4	Britney-Lee Nicholson	Coastal Spirit SAS	Halswell Christchurch United	Home	12–0	29 April 2023
5	Melanie Cameron (Note: Player scored 4 goals)	Coastal Spirit SAS	Selwyn United	Away	0–20	6 May 2023
5	Britney-Lee Nicholson (Note: Player scored 8 goals)	Coastal Spirit SAS	Selwyn United	Away	0–20	6 May 2023

==== Own goals ====
Round	Player	Club	Against
2	Jasmine Ball	University of Canterbury	Coastal Spirit SAS
7	Leigh Bowie	Selwyn United	University of Canterbury

=== ODT Women's Southern Premiership ===
ODT Women's Southern Premiership League
- Season: 2023
- Dates: 1 April 2023 - 6 May 2023
- Champions: Dunedin City Royals
- Matches: 21
- Goals: 88 (4.19 per match)
- Top goalscorer: Nieve Collin (6 goals)
- Biggest home win: Queenstown 11–0 Northern (22 April 2023)
- Biggest away win: Green Island 0–11 Dunedin City Royals (6 May 2023)
- Highest scoring: Queenstown 11–0 Northern (22 April 2023); Green Island 0–11 Dunedin City Royals (6 May 2023)
- Longest winning run: Dunedin City Royals (6 matches)
- Longest unbeaten run: Dunedin City Royals (6 matches)
- Longest winless run: Northern (6 matches)
- Longest losing run: Northern (6 matches)
- All statistics correct as of Completed.

==== Teams ====
All seven teams from the previous season competed.

Team	Home ground	Location	2022 Season
Dunedin City Royals	Logan Park	Dunedin North, Dunedin	1st ODT Women's Southern Premiership
Green Island	Sunnyvale Park	Green Island, Dunedin	5th ODT Women's Southern Premiership
Mosgiel	Memorial Park Ground	Mosgiel	7th ODT Women's Southern Premiership
Northern	Forrester Park	Normanby, Dunedin	6th ODT Women's Southern Premiership
Otago University	Logan Park	Dunedin North, Dunedin	3rd ODT Women's Southern Premiership
Queenstown Rovers	Queenstown Events Centre	Frankton, Queenstown	4th ODT Women's Southern Premiership
Roslyn Wakari	Ellis Park	Glenross, Dunedin	2nd ODT Women's Southern Premiership

==== League ====
The league was a single round, with the top four teams advancing to the South Island League southern playoffs. The bottom three teams played in the ODT Women's Southern Championship, with the two teams who did not qualify for the South Island League.

===== Table =====
Pos	Team	Pld	W	D	L	GF	GA	GD	Pts	Qualification
1	Dunedin City Royals (C, Q)	6	6	0	0	35	0	+35	18	Winner of Women's Southern Premiership and qualification to South Island League Playoffs
2	Roslyn-Wakari (Q)	6	4	1	1	16	6	+10	13	Qualification to South Island League Playoffs
3	Otago University (Q)	6	3	1	2	13	3	+10	10	Qualification to South Island League Playoffs
4	Queenstown (Q)	6	3	0	3	16	12	+4	9	Qualification to South Island League Playoffs
5	Green Island	6	2	0	4	5	16	−11	6	Qualification to Southern Football Women's Championship
6	Mosgiel	6	2	0	4	3	17	−14	6	Qualification to Southern Football Women's Championship
7	Northern	6	0	0	6	0	34	−34	0	Qualification to Southern Football Women's Championship

Source: Mainland Football
Rules for classification: 1) Points; 2) Goal difference; 3) Goals scored; 4) Goals against; 5) Head to head; 6) Disciplinary record; 7) Coin toss
(C) Champions; (Q) Qualified for the phase indicated

===== Results Table =====
Home \ Away	DC	GI	MO	NO	OU	QU	RW
Dunedin City Royals			7–0		6–0		4–0
Green Island	0–11		4–0				
Mosgiel				1–0		1–0	1–3
Northern	0–6	0–1			0–7		
Otago University	0–1	2–1	3–0				
Queenstown		2–0		11–0	2–1		0–0
Roslyn-Wakari		1–0		8–0		4–1	

Source: Mainland Football
Legend: Blue = home team win; Yellow = draw; Red = away team win.

===== League top scorers =====
Rank	Player	Club	Goals
1	Nieve Collin	Dunedin City Royals	6
2	Chelsea Whittaker	Dunedin City Royals	5
3	Mikayla Gray	Dunedin City Royals	4
3	Keely Osborne	Queenstown	4
3	Zara Partley	Roslyn-Wakari	4
3	Holly White	Roslyn-Wakari	4
7	Margarida Dias	Dunedin City Royals	3
7	Madeline McCormick	Otago University	3
7	Rose Hanna Morton	Dunedin City Royals	3
7	Jemma Wilson	Roslyn-Wakari	3

===== League hat-tricks =====
Round	Player	For	Against	Home/Away	Result	Date
1	Rose Morton	Dunedin City Royals	Mosgiel	Home	7–0	1 April 2023
2	Margarida Dias	Dunedin City Royals	Northern	Away	0–6	5 April 2023
3	Madeline McCormick	Otago University	Northern	Away	0–7	19 April 2023
5	Holly White	Roslyn-Wakari	Northern	Home	8–0	25 April 2023
7	Nieve Collin	Dunedin City Royals	Green Island	Away	0–11	6 May 2023

===== Own goals =====
Round	Player	Club	Against
3	Laura Wallis	Queenstown	Roslyn-Wakari
7	Paige Julian	Green Island	Dunedin City Royals

==== South Island League Playoffs ====
Each team played each other once over three rounds, with the top two advancing to the South Island League, while the bottom two played in the ODT Women's Southern Championship.

===== Table =====
Pos	Team	Pld	W	D	L	GF	GA	GD	Pts	Qualification
1	Dunedin City Royals (C, Q)	3	2	1	0	12	4	+8	7	Winner of South Island League Playoffs and qualification to South Island League
2	Otago University (Q)	3	2	0	1	6	4	+2	6	Qualification to South Island League
3	Queenstown	3	0	2	1	3	6	−3	2	Qualification to Southern Football Women's Championship
4	Roslyn-Wakari	3	0	1	2	3	10	−7	1	Qualification to Southern Football Women's Championship

Source: Mainland Football
Rules for classification: 1) Points; 2) Goal difference; 3) Goals scored; 4) Goals against; 5) Head to head; 6) Disciplinary record; 7) Coin toss
(C) Champions; (Q) Qualified for the phase indicated

===== Results Table =====
Home \ Away	DC	OU	QU	RW
Dunedin City Royals		3–1		7–1
Otago University			3–0	
Queenstown	2–2			
Roslyn-Wakari		1–2	1–1	

Source: Mainland Football
Legend: Blue = home team win; Yellow = draw; Red = away team win.

===== League top scorers =====
Rank	Player	Club	Goals
1	Ruby Anderson	Dunedin City Royals	4
3	Carolyn Days	Otago University	2
3	Margarida Dias	Dunedin City Royals	2
3	Tahlia Roome	Dunedin City Royals	2
3	Morgan Smiley	Otago University	2
3	Jemma Wilson	Roslyn-Wakari	2
7	Madeline Braun	Queenstown	1
7	Hope Donoghue	Queenstown	1
7	Charlotte Marvin	Otago University	1
7	Abbey Neilson	Queenstown	1
7	Eloise Robinson	Otago University	1
7	Shontell Smite	Dunedin City Royals	1
7	Chelsea Whittaker	Dunedin City Royals	1

===== League hat-tricks =====
Round	Player	For	Against	Home/Away	Result	Date
1	Ruby Anderson	Dunedin City Royals	Roslyn-Wakari	Home	7–1	20 May 2023

== South Island League ==
The six teams each played every other team twice, once at home and once away.

=== Qualified Teams ===
Cashmere Technical, Coastal Spirit SAS and Dunedin City Royals returned to the league, joined by Otago University from Southern Football, with Nelson Suburbs and University of Canterbury from Mainland Football.

Association	Team	Position in Regional League	App (last)	Previous best (last)
Mainland Football (4 berths)	Coastal Spirit SAS	1st	1st	Debut
Mainland Football (4 berths)	Cashmere Technical	2nd	1st	Debut
Mainland Football (4 berths)	University of Canterbury	3rd	1st	Debut
Mainland Football (4 berths)	Nelson Suburbs	4th	1st	Debut
Southern Football (2 berths)	Dunedin City Royals	1st	1st	Debut
Southern Football (2 berths)	Otago University	2nd	1st	Debut

=== Table ===
Pos	Team	Pld	W	D	L	GF	GA	GD	Pts	Qualification
1	Cashmere Technical (C)	10	9	1	0	36	9	+27	28	Winner of Women's South Island League
2	Dunedin City Royals	10	6	2	2	30	11	+19	20	
3	Coastal Spirit SAS	9	5	2	2	35	12	+23	17	
4	Otago University	9	3	1	5	12	34	−22	10	
5	University of Canterbury	10	1	1	8	9	31	−22	4	
6	Nelson Suburbs	10	1	1	8	9	34	−25	4	

Updated to match(es) played on 2 September 2023. Source: Mainland Football
Rules for classification: 1) Points; 2) Goal difference; 3) Goals scored; 4) Goals against; 5) Head to head; 6) Disciplinary record; 7) Coin toss
(C) Champions

=== Results Table ===
Home \ Away	CT	CS	DC	NS	OU	UC
Cashmere Technical		4–3	3–1	3–1	4–1	6–1
Coastal Spirit SAS	1–1		0–0 (Note: Game postponed due to Coastal's Kate Sheppard Cup semi final.)	8–0	PP (Note: Game postponed, reason unknown.)	2–1
Dunedin City Royals	0–2	4–2		4–0	6–1	6–0
Nelson Suburbs	1–5	0–5	1–3		0–1	2–2
Otago University	0–6	0–10	2–2	2–4		2–1
University of Canterbury	0–2	2–4	0–4	1–0	1–3	

Updated to match(es) played on 20 August 2023. Source: Mainland Football
Legend: Blue = home team win; Yellow = draw; Red = away team win.

=== League top scorers ===
Rank	Player	Club	Goals
1	Britney-Lee Nicholson	Coastal Spirit SAS	15
2	Shontelle Smith	Dunedin City Royals	7
3	Aimee Phillips	Cashmere Technical	6
3	Jayda Stewart	Coastal Spirit SAS	6
5	Nicola Dominkovich	Cashmere Technical	5
5	Amy Hislop	Otago University	5
5	Charlotte Roche	Cashmere Technical	5
8	Melanie Cameron	Coastal Spirit SAS	4
8	Freya Partridge-Moore	Dunedin City Royals	4
8	Jonelle Author	Cashmere Technical	4
11	Multiple players		3

=== League hat-tricks ===
Round	Player	For	Against	Home/Away	Result	Date
3	Aimee Phillips	Cashmere Technical	Otago University	Away	0–6	1 July 2023
5	Jayda Stewart (Note: Player scored 4 goals)	Coastal Spirit SAS	Otago University	Away	0–10	23 July 2023
5	Britney-Lee Nicholson	Coastal Spirit SAS	Otago University	Away	0–10	23 July 2023
7	Britney-Lee Nicholson	Coastal Spirit SAS	Nelson Suburbs	Away	0–5	5 August 2023
9	Britney-Lee Nicholson (Note: Player scored 5 goals)	Coastal Spirit SAS	Nelson Suburbs	Home	8–0	19 August 2023
9	Freya Partridge-Moore	Dunedin City Royals	Otago University	Home	6–1	19 August 2023
10	Britney-Lee Nicholson	Coastal Spirit SAS	Cashmere Technical	Away	4–3	27 August 2023

=== Own goals ===
Round	Player	Club	Against
3	Sophie Hartshaw	University of Canterbury	Dunedin City Royals
