= Rebecca Lake (footballer) =

New Zealand footballer

Personal information
- Full name: Rebecca Emily Lake
- Date of birth: 13 May 1999 (age 27)
- Place of birth: Christchurch, New Zealand
- Height: 1.73 m (5 ft 8 in)
- Position: Center-back

Team information
- Current team: Central Coast Mariners
- Number: 2

Youth career
- Waimakariri United AFC

Senior career*
Years	Team	Apps	(Gls)
2014–2022	Canterbury United Pride		
2014–2022	→ Coastal Spirit (dual registration)		
–2022	University of Canterbury (futsal)		
–2022	Canterbury United Pride (futsal)		
2023	Northern Tigers FC	18	(0)
2023–2025	Wellington Phoenix	19	(0)
2025	→ Cashmere Technical (loan)		
2025	Vancouver Rise	5	(0)
2025	→ Vancouver Rise FC Academy	0	(0)
2026	Thái Nguyên T&T	9	(0)
2026–	Central Coast Mariners	0	(0)

International career^{‡}
2016	New Zealand U17	7	(0)
2017	New Zealand U19	4	(0)
2022	New Zealand (University) (futsal)		
- * Club domestic league appearances and goals as of 3 August 2026 ‡ National team caps and goals as of 31 December 2022

Rebecca Emily Lake (born 13 May 1999) is a New Zealand footballer who plays as a center-back for A-League Women club Central Coast Mariners.

== Early life ==
Lake played youth football with Waimakariri United AFC.

== Club career ==
From 2014 to 2022, Lake played with Canterbury United Pride in the New Zealand Women's National League, captaining the side for three seasons, and completing a three-peat league championship in 2020. She also played with Coastal Spirit FC during this time.

In 2023, she joined Australian club Northern Tigers FC in the second tier NPL New South Wales.

In July 2023, she signed with New Zealand club Wellington Phoenix, who played in the A-League Women, the first tier of football in Australia. During her first season, she was named the team's vice captain. In March 2024, after appearing in 17 of the club's first 18 matches, she suffered a season-ending injury, due to a high ankle sprain. After the season, she re-signed with the club for the 2024–25 season. However, after only two matches into the new season, she suffered another season-ending injury, after rupturing ligaments in her left foot. In July 2025, she briefly joined Cashmere Technical in New Zealand. In September 2025, she departed the Wellington Phoenix.

In September 2025, she joined Canadian Northern Super League club Vancouver Rise FC.

In April 2026, Lake joined Vietnamese club Thái Nguyên T&T, becoming the first foreign player in the team's history.

In October 2026, Lake returned to Australia, signing with Central Coast Mariners.

== International career ==
Lake debuted with the New Zealand U17 at the 2016 OFC U-17 Women's Championship, later playing with the team at the 2016 FIFA U-17 Women's World Cup. She later was called up for the 2017 OFC U-19 Women's Championship and the 2018 FIFA U-20 Women's World Cup.

In 2019, Lake was called up to the New Zealand futsal team for a friendly competition, Gold Coast International Futsal Challenge, where they played other teams representing governing bodies in Australia. Lake scored 4 goals, as the team finished champions.

In 2022, Lake captained the New Zealand women's University futsal team competing at the World University Futsal Championships, finishing in fourth place.

In January 2023, she was called up to the New Zealand senior team for the first time.

== Honours ==
Coastal Spirit

- Reta Fitzpatrick Cup: 2014, 2015, 2017, 2020, 2021, 2022
- Mainland Women's Premier League: 2014, 2015, 2017, 2018, 2019, 2020, 2021, 2022
- South Island Championship: 2022

Canterbury United Pride

- National Women's League: 2014, 2016, 2018, 2019, 2020

Canterbury United Pride Futsal

- Women's Futsal SuperLeague: 2019

University of Canterbury Futsal

- Women's National Tertiary Futsal Championship: 2021

Cashmere Technical

- Reta Fitzpatrick Cup: 2025

Individual

- Mainland Football Women's Defender of the Year: 2017, 2019, 2020, 2021, 2022
- Mainland Football Women's Player of the Year: 2019, 2020
