= Annalie Longo =

New Zealand footballer (born 1991)

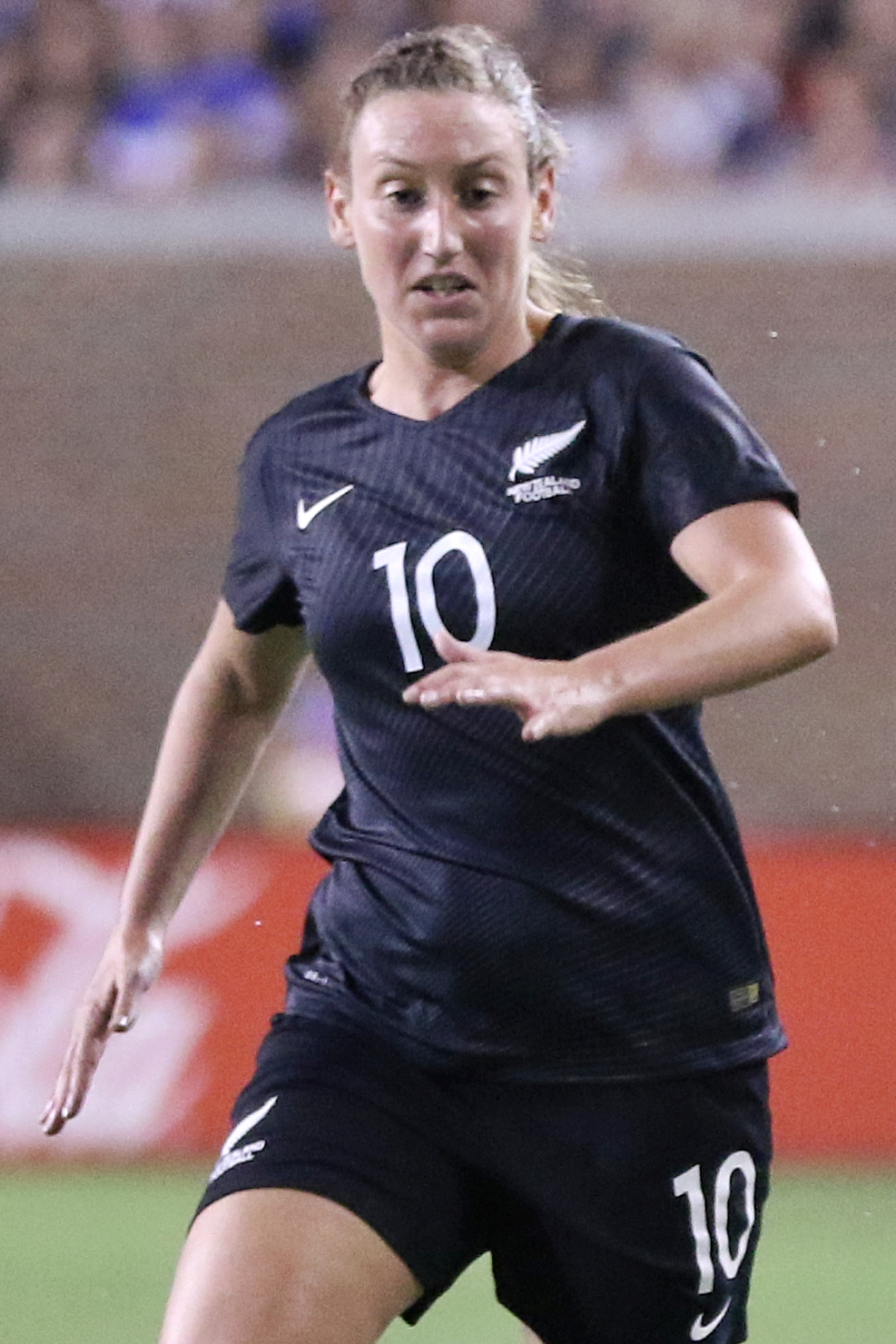
- Annalie Longo in 2017

Personal information
- Full name: Annalie Antonia Longo
- Date of birth: 1 July 1991 (age 35)
- Place of birth: Auckland, New Zealand
- Height: 1.57 m (5 ft 2 in)
- Position: Attacking midfielder

Team information
- Current team: Auckland United
- Number: 16

Youth career
- Three Kings United

Senior career*
Years	Team	Apps	(Gls)
2004–2013	Three Kings United		(31)
2012	Sydney FC	11	(1)
2014–2015	Coastal Spirit FC		
- Canterbury United Pride
2019–2021	Melbourne Victory	24	(5)
2020	Cashmere Technical	10	(16)
2023–2025	Wellington Phoenix	35	(4)
2024–2025	Cashmere Technical	9	(11)
2025	Auckland United	1	(0)

International career^{‡}
2008-	New Zealand U-17	10	(2)
2006–2010	New Zealand U-20	25	(2)
2006–2025	New Zealand	140	(15)
- * Club domestic league appearances and goals as of 12 May 2025 ‡ National team caps and goals as of 26 June 2025

Annalie Antonia Longo (born 1 July 1991) is a New Zealand professional footballer who plays for Auckland United in the New Zealand Women's National League and formerly the New Zealand national team.

She has played for Sydney FC, Melbourne Victory, and Wellington Phoenix in the Australian A-League Women.

== Early life ==
Longo got into football when she used to go with her dad, Paul, to watch her brothers, Jason and Julian, play for Eden Football Club. She joined the club which merged with Mt Roskill to become Three Kings United. She received additional coaching at the Wynton Rufer Soccer School of Excellence from 1999 to 2006.

Longo attended Epsom Girls' Grammar School and played for their first XI, winning the NZ Secondary Schoolgirls tournament in 2008 with future international teammates Anna Green and Hannah Wall. This was after the team won the Auckland provincial championships unbeaten.

== Club career ==
=== Three Kings United ===
Longo played youth football for Three Kings United throughout her childhood. She debuted for the senior women's team in the Northern Premier Women's League in 2004.

=== Coastal Spirit FC ===
In 2014 and 2015, Longo played for Coastal Spirit FC in the Mainland Women's Premiership League.

=== Melbourne Victory ===
On 25 October 2019, Longo signed a one-year deal with Melbourne Victory to return to the Australian W-League. She made her first appearance for Victory in their 3–2 win over the Brisbane Roar, playing 74 minutes before getting subbed off in the second half. In September 2021, it was announced that Longo wouldn't return to Melbourne Victory for the 2021–22 W-League season.

=== Wellington Phoenix ===
In September 2023, Longo returned to the game, signing with New Zealand A-League Women club Wellington Phoenix.

=== Cashmere Technical ===
In May 2024, Longo returned to New Zealand's Women's South Island League side Cashmere Technical to compete in the 2024 season, where she is one of multiple A-League players who have joined clubs in regional competitions to stay active between A-League seasons.

=== Auckland United ===
On 2 October 2025, Longo signed for Auckland United ahead of the 2026 FIFA Women's Champions Cup.

== International career ==
=== U-17 ===
She scored New Zealand's first goal at the 2008 inaugural FIFA U-17 Women's World Cup although they were effectively eliminated from contention in the 1–2 loss to Denmark, having previously lost 0–1 to Canada in the opening game.

=== U-20 ===
Longo also represented New Zealand at the 2006 Women's U-20 World Cup finals, where she played in all three games.

Longo was again included in the U-20 squad for the 2008 Women's U-20 World Cup finals to be played in Chile, featuring in two of their three group games. In 2010, she represented New Zealand at a third Under-20 World Cup, this time in Germany, appearing in all three group games.

=== National team ===
Longo, at age 15, made her Football Ferns debut in a 0–3 loss to China PR on 14 November 2006, becoming New Zealand's youngest senior football international. She then went on to represent New Zealand at the 2007 FIFA Women's World Cup finals in China, where they lost to Brazil 0–5, Denmark (0–2) and China PR (0–2). Longo is the second youngest player to represent any country at a senior FIFA World Cup.

She played one of New Zealand's three matches in the 2011 FIFA Women's World Cup in Germany and all three matches of her country at the 2015 FIFA Women's World Cup in Canada. She also competed for New Zealand at both the 2012 and 2016 Olympics.

Longo made her 100th appearance for New Zealand in a friendly against the United States in September 2017 and is the first player in the world to compete at all U17, U20, Women's World Cup and Olympic Games tournaments.

On 25 June 2021, Longo was called up to the New Zealand squad for the delayed 2020 Summer Olympics.

Longo was called up to the New Zealand squad for the 2023 FIFA Women's World Cup.

On 4 July 2024, Longo was called up to the New Zealand squad for the 2024 Summer Olympics.

== International goals ==
No.	Date	Venue	Opponent	Score	Result	Competition
1.	25 October 2014	Kalabond Oval, Kokopo, Papua New Guinea	Tonga	9–0	16–0	2014 OFC Women's Nations Cup
2.	25 October 2014	Kalabond Oval, Kokopo, Papua New Guinea	Tonga	13–0	16–0	2014 OFC Women's Nations Cup
3.	27 October 2014	Kalabond Oval, Kokopo, Papua New Guinea	Papua New Guinea	3–0	3–0	2014 OFC Women's Nations Cup
4.	12 January 2015	Kempinski Hotel Belek, Belek, Turkey	Denmark	1–0	1–1	Friendly
5.	15 January 2015	Kempinski Hotel Belek, Belek, Turkey	Denmark	3–2	3–2	Friendly
6.	23 January 2016	PNGFA Academy, Lae, Papua New Guinea	Papua New Guinea	3–0	7–1	2016 OFC Women's Olympic Qualifying Tournament
7.	23 January 2016	PNGFA Academy, Lae, Papua New Guinea	Papua New Guinea	5–0	7–1	2016 OFC Women's Olympic Qualifying Tournament
8.	19 November 2018	Stade Numa-Daly Magenta, Nouméa, New Caledonia	Tonga	2–0	11–0	2018 OFC Women's Nations Cup
9.	19 November 2018	Stade Numa-Daly Magenta, Nouméa, New Caledonia	Tonga	3–0	11–0	2018 OFC Women's Nations Cup
10.	22 November 2018	Stade Numa-Daly Magenta, Nouméa, New Caledonia	Cook Islands	1–0	6–0	2018 OFC Women's Nations Cup
11.	25 November 2018	Stade Numa-Daly Magenta, Nouméa, New Caledonia	Fiji	1–0	10–0	2018 OFC Women's Nations Cup
12.	25 November 2018	Stade Numa-Daly Magenta, Nouméa, New Caledonia	Fiji	4–0	10–0	2018 OFC Women's Nations Cup

== Personal life ==
She was a student at Auckland's Epsom Girls' Grammar School. In footballing circles, she is known by the nickname "flea".

In an interview Longo gave in November 2014, she said she lives in Kaiapoi but also spends half of her week in Auckland for national trainings. While in Kaiapoi, she plays for Canterbury United Pride and then spends the rest of her time coaching at the Grasshopper Soccer programme – a non-competitive programme for kids aged 2–10 years, where the focus is on fun and skill development. She said that she enjoyed working with young children and enjoyed watching them develop.

== Honours ==
=== High school ===
- NZ Secondary Schoolgirls champions: 2008

=== Club ===
Three Kings United

- Northern Premier Women's League runner-ups: 2004, 2010
- Northern Premier Women's League winners: 2006, 2007
- Women's Knockout Cup runner-ups: 2004, 2010
- Women's Knockout Cup winners: 2012

Auckland Football Federation

- National Women's League champions

Canterbury United Pride

- National Women's League champions

Cashmere Technical

- South Island Qualifying League (North) winners: 2024

=== International ===
- OFC U-19 Women's Championship: 2006, 2010

=== Personal ===
- 2007 ASB Bank Young Sportsperson of the Year
- Finalist, International Women's Young Player of the Year
- Finalist, Auckland Junior Sportswoman of the Year
- National U-14 Girls Tournament Golden Boot: 2005
- Mainland Football Womens Midfielder of the Year: 2014, 2020
