= Coastal Spirit FC =

Association football club based in New Zealand

Coastal Spirit
- Coastal Spirit Football Club Logo
- Full name: Coastal Spirit Football Club
- Nickname: Coastal
- Short name: Coastal Spirit
- Founded: 2007; 19 years ago
- Ground: Tāne Norton Park, Christchurch, New Zealand
- Manager: Robert Stanton
- League: National League
- 2026: Southern League, 4th of 10
- Website: www.coastalspirit.co.nz
Home colours	Away colours	Third colours

Coastal Spirit FC is an association football club in Christchurch, New Zealand and are a part of Mainland Football's federation. Their Premier Men's team currently competes in the National League. Their Premier Women's team competes in the Women's South Island League and were the 2013 National Knockout Cup winners.

== History ==
=== Merge ===
Coastal Spirit FC was established through the merger of New Brighton AFC and Rangers AFC in 2007, which was one of the oldest clubs in Christchurch having been founded in 1913. Prior to the merge, New Brighton and Rangers competed in the Mainland Premier League, with New Brighton getting relegated in 2006 and Rangers in 2007.

=== Earthquake ===
In 2010, the 2010 and 2011 Canterbury earthquakes ruined the home ground of Bexley park and Eric Adam park was not in use anymore, Coastal had to find a new home. Less than 2 kilometres south-west from Bexley park, Cuthberts Green was decided to be the new home ground of Coastal Spirit.

=== Coastal Spirit SASFC ===
In 2020, Coastal Spirit joined forces with St. Albans Shirley to help provide a pathway for women's youth and senior football. With the women's premier team having an outstanding season, by winning the league (Mainland Premier Women's League) and winning the local cup (Reta Fitzpatrick Cup). With the success of the premier season, 2021 season saw the arrangement expand into the Boys Youth competition. With the women's premier team having another outstanding season, by winning the league (Mainland Premier Women's League), the local cup (Reta Fitzpatrick Cup) and reaching the semi-finals of the delayed national cup (Kate Sheppard Cup) due to COVID-19. Following the end-of-season discussions, its now been agreed that all Girls Youth, Boys CDL Youth and Men's and Women's Premier/Reserves teams will be a joint enterprise between the two clubs for the 2022 season and beyond. The Junior and Social grades will continue to be run by the individual clubs. With the women's premier team having another outstanding season, by winning the league (Mainland Premier Women's League), the local cup (Reta Fitzpatrick Cup) and the winning the inaugural South Island Championships. In 2023, the introduction of Ōtākaro has taken the responsibility of Boys CDL Youth teams away from the 2 clubs. And the women's premier team winning the Women's South Island Qualifying League, runners-up in the local cup (Reta Fitzpatrick Cup) and reaching the semi-finals of the national cup (Kate Sheppard Cup). Throughout this time, the women's premier team have only recorded 2 losses out of 54 league games, over 4 seasons.

=== Ōtākaro ===
In 2023, 6 clubs on the eastern side of Christchurch merged their Boys Youth teams to provide the players the best possible option for aspirational youth players on the East side of Christchurch. The 6 clubs that helped create the new entity of Ōtākaro FC are, Burwood, Coastal Spirit, Ferrymead Bays, Parklands United, St Albans Shirley and Western. The club has had success in the premier season, with the 13th grade boys winning their league, 14th grade boys winning their league, 15th grade boys coming runners up in their league, and the 17th grade boys coming 5th out of 6th in their league. The 17th grade boys are also competing in the Youth Southern League for qualification to the Youth National League.

== Home Grounds ==
Coastal Spirit play their home games at Linfield Park (officially known as Tāne Norton Park), as well as Linwood Rugby FC, a rugby union club in Christchurch. Prior to the move in 2020, Coastal played their home games at Cuthberts Green, but due to poor conditions and not being up to the standards in the recent years, the decision was made to move the club. Throughout the years, Coastal have had many of their home games moved to English Park.

Coastal was originally based at Bexley Park for 4 years. They would occasionally play at Eric Adam Park ((formerly known as Rangers Park), now a subdivision in Bromley) the former home of Rangers AFC, where both Eric Adam Park and Bexley Park got damaged during the 2010 and 2011 earthquakes causing for a relocation. On 19 September 2010, Coastal played Richmond Athletic FC in the second leg promotion playoff tie for promotion to Mainland Premier League at Eric Adam Park, Coastal went on to win the game 3–0. Coastal Spirit won 5–4 on aggregate, this was the fairytale ending to Eric Adam Park.

In the Southern League era, Coastal have played their home games at Tāne Norton Park, generally on Sunday compared to the normal Saturday game, this is because Linwood Rugby have the priority to play games at Tāne Norton Park. On a few occasions when the field is torn up from rugby or its unplayable (not up to standard), the home games have moved to the Artificial turf of English Park. On 6 August 2023, St. Albans Park became a new venue that's hosted a Southern League game, the venue is where St Albans Shirley FC are located, Coastal played Nelson Suburbs where Nelson won the game 2–3.

== Season by season record ==
Season	Division	League									Chatham Cup		Top League Scorer	
Season	Division	P	W	D	L	F	A	GD	Pts	Pos	Chatham Cup		Name	Goals
Senior (Men's)
2011	Premier	21	9	4	8	31	32	-1	31	3rd	R4		—	
2012	Premier	21	9	4	8	34	27	7	31	4th	R3		—	
2013	Premier	21	6	6	9	28	35	-7	24	6th	R1		—	
2014	Premier	21	7	3	11	37	50	-13	24	5th	R4		—	
2015	Premier	21	9	3	9	37	30	7	30	4th	R4		—	
2016	Premier	21	14	2	5	40	24	16	44	3rd	R3		—	
2017	Premier	21	12	3	6	41	24	17	39	3rd	R3		—	
2018	Premier	14	10	1	3	35	10	25	31	2nd	R3		—	
2018	Championship	7	2	1	4	21	14	7	7	6th	R3		—	
2019	Premier	14	6	1	7	35	23	12	19	5th	R1		—	
2019	Championship	7	4	1	2	18	11	7	13	3rd	R1		—	
2020	Premier	21	10	6	5	48	26	22	36	4th	—		—	
2021	Premier	14	9	1	4	26	18	8	28	2nd	R3		(Fiji) Mika Rubuka	4
Senior (Women's)
Season	Division	League									Reta Fitzpatrick Cup	Kate Sheppard Cup	Top League Scorer	
Season	Division	P	W	D	L	F	A	GD	Pts	Pos	Reta Fitzpatrick Cup	Kate Sheppard Cup	Name	Goals
2010	Premier	19	14	4	1	71	9	62	46	1st	—	R2	—	
2011	Premier	15	12	0	3	50	11	39	36	2nd	1st	2nd	—	
2012	Premier	20	18	2	0	82	7	75	56	1st	1st	SF	—	
2013	Premier	15	14	0	1	53	11	42	42	1st	—N/a	1st	—	
2014	Premier	15	14	0	1	69	11	58	42	1st	1st	SF	—	
2015	Premier	12	10	1	1	55	7	48	31	1st	1st	SF	—	
2016	Premier	18	16	0	2	102	17	85	48	2nd	—N/a	R2	—	
2017	Premier	15	14	0	1	63	15	48	42	1st	1st	QF	—	
2018	Premier	12	7	4	1	43	14	29	25	1st	—N/a	QF	—	
2019	Premier	12	10	1	1	52	7	45	31	1st	—N/a	2nd	—	
2020	Premier	12	11	1	0	67	5	62	34	1st	1st	—	—	
2021	Premier	15	15	0	0	117	6	111	45	1st	1st	SF	♦ (New Zealand) Melanie Cameron (New Zealand) Britney-Lee Nicholson	31; 29
2022	Premier	9	9	0	0	43	4	39	27	1st	1st	R3	♦ (New Zealand) Melanie Cameron	15
2022	Championship	3	3	0	0	13	1	12	9	1st	1st	R3	♦ (New Zealand) Isla McPherson	4
2023	Qualifying	6	5	1	0	42	2	40	16	1st	SF	SF	♦ (New Zealand) Britney-lee Nicholson	15
2023	South Island	9	5	2	2	35	12	23	17	3rd	SF	SF	♦ (New Zealand) Britney-lee Nicholson	15
2024	Qualifying	6	3	2	1	13	6	7	11	2nd	SF	R2	(New Zealand) Laura Newman	4
2024	South Island	10	6	1	3	25	14	11	19	3rd	SF	R2	(New Zealand) Melanie Cameron	8
2025	South Island	16	11	0	5	63	22	41	33	4th	QF	R2	♦ (New Zealand) Britney-Lee Nicholson	22
2026	South Island	14	4	1	9	12	27	-15	13	5th	TBD	R1	(Japan) Saki Nagai (New Zealand) Olivia Woollett	4

Promotion Playoffs
Season	Division	P	W	D	L	GF	GA	Aggregate	Against	Chatham Cup
Senior (Men's)
2009	Promotion Playoffs	2	0	1	1	4	5	4–5	Ferrymead Bays	R2
2010	Promotion Playoffs	2	1	0	1	5	4	5–4	Richmond Athletic FC	R2

R1	Round 1		Champions
R2	Round 2		Runners-up
R3	Round 3		Third Place
R4	Round 4		Last Place
QF	Quarter Final	♦	Top scorer in competition
SF	Semi Final		

2021– (National League)

Season	Southern League									National League									English Cup	Chatham Cup	Top scorer	
Season	P	W	D	L	F	A	GD	Pts	Pos	P	W	D	L	F	A	GD	Pts	Pos	English Cup	Chatham Cup	Name	Goals
2021	7	3	0	4	12	12	0	9	6th	Did not qualify									R1	R3	(New Zealand) Michael Hogan	9
2022	18	3	7	8	34	43	-9	16	6th	Did not qualify									QF	R3	(New Zealand) Treye Butler, (New Zealand) Michael Hogan	5
2023	18	10	1	7	30	36	-6	31	3rd	Did not qualify									SF	R2	(New Zealand) Omar Cameron	12
2024	18	14	3	1	59	17	42	45	2nd	9	3	2	4	18	20	-2	11	7th	W	SF	(United States) Alex Steinwascher	35
2025	18	14	0	4	56	21	+35	42	1st	10	2	1	7	5	23	−18	7	11th	QF	R2	(Japan) Riku Ichimura	17
2026	18	11	1	6	45	36	+9	34	4th	Did not qualify									2nd	R1	(New Zealand) Max Chrétien	10

Season	League	Div	P	W	D	L	GF	GA	GD	Pts	League Position	English Cup	Chatham Cup	Top scorer	
Season	League	Div	P	W	D	L	GF	GA	GD	Pts	League Position	English Cup	Chatham Cup	Name	Goals
2027	National League	1									TBD				

== Honours ==
=== Men's ===
- League
  - Mainland Premier League
    - Runners up (2): 2018, 2021
    - Third (3): 2011, 2016, 2017
  - Southern Football League
    - Third (1): 2018
  - Southern League
    - Champions (1): 2025
    - Runners up (1): 2024
    - Third (1): 2023
  - Canterbury Championship League
    - Champions (1): 2026 (Note: Won by U20 Reserves)
  - Canterbury Division 1
    - Champions (2): 2009, 2010
- Cup
  - English Cup
    - Champions (1): 2024
    - Runners up (4): 2008, 2016, 2018, 2026
  - Chatham Cup
    - Semi Finalist (1): 2024
- Other
  - Mainland Football Team of the Year
    - Winners (2): 2024, 2025
  - Hurley Shield
    - Winners (5): 2011, 2017, 2018, 2023, 2025
  - McFarlane Cup
    - Winners (2): 2011, 2024

=== Women's ===
- League
  - Mainland Women's Premier League
    - Champions (12) (Record): 2008, 2010, 2012, 2013, 2014, 2015, 2017, 2018, 2019, 2020, 2021, 2022
    - Runners up (2): 2011, 2016
  - South Island Championship
    - Champions (1): 2022
  - South Island Qualifying League
    - Champions (1): 2023
    - Runners up (1): 2024
  - South Island League
    - Third (2): 2023, 2024
- Cup
  - Reta Fitzpatrick Cup
    - Champions (10) (Shared Record): 2008, 2009, 2011, 2012, 2014, 2015, 2017, 2020, 2021, 2022
  - Kate Sheppard Cup
    - Champions (1): 2013
    - Runners up (2): 2011, 2019
- Other
  - Mainland Football Team of the Year
    - Winners (8): 2012, 2014, 2017, 2018, 2019, 2020, 2021, 2022
  - McFarlane Cup
    - Winners (7): 2014, 2017, 2018, 2019, 2021, 2022, 2023
  - Hawkey Shield
    - Winners (9): 2016, 2017, 2018, 2019, 2020, 2021, 2022, 2023, 2024

== Records ==
=== Men's Results per opposition ===
Coastal Spirit Men's Southern League record vs all opponents

Southern League
Opposition	Span	Played	Won	Drawn	Lost	GF	GA	Win%
Cashmere Technical	2021–2026	11	3	2	6	16	31	27.3%
Christchurch United	2021–2026	11	5	0	6	15	21	45.5%
Dunedin City Royals	2021–2026	11	7	2	2	27	15	63.6%
FC Twenty 11	2023–2024	4	4	0	0	15	1	100.0%
Ferrymead Bays	2022–2026	10	3	1	6	8	21	30.0%
Green Island	2021–2023	5	3	0	2	11	11	60.0%
Mosgiel	2022	2	1	1	0	7	2	50.0%
Nelson Suburbs	2021–2026	11	3	4	4	18	23	27.3%
Nomads United	2022–2026	10	7	1	2	26	13	70.0%
Northern	2026	2	2	0	0	7	1	100%
Otago University	2021	1	1	0	0	3	0	100%
Selwyn United	2021–2026	11	8	1	2	39	18	72.7%
Universities	2024-2025	4	4	0	0	24	6	100%
Wānaka	2025–2026	4	4	0	0	14	2	100%
Overall	2021–2026	97	55	12	30	196	165	56.7%
National League
Opposition	Span	Played	Won	Drawn	Lost	GF	GA	Win%
Auckland City	2024-2025	2	0	0	2	1	8	0%
Auckland FC Reserves	2025	1	1	0	0	1	0	100%
Auckland United	2025	1	0	0	1	0	3	0%
Birkenhead United	2024-2025	2	0	0	2	2	4	0%
Cashmere Technical	2024	1	0	1	0	3	3	0%
Christchurch United	2025	1	0	1	0	0	0	0%
Eastern Suburbs	2024	1	1	0	0	2	1	100%
Miramar Rangers	2025	1	0	0	1	3	1	0%
Napier City Rovers	2024	1	0	0	1	3	1	0%
Wellington Olympic	2024-2025	2	0	1	1	1	3	0%
Wellington Phoenix Reserves	2024-2025	2	1	0	1	3	1	50%
Western Springs	2024-2025	2	1	0	1	3	6	50%
Western Suburbs	2024-2025	2	1	0	2	5	8	50%
Overall	2024-2025	19	5	3	11	23	43	26.3%
Total	2021–2024	116	60	15	41	239	208	51.7%
Updated to: 30 August 2026

=== Women's Results per opposition ===
Coastal Spirit Women's Southern League record vs all opponents

South Island League
Opposition	Span	Played	Won	Drawn	Lost	GF	GA	Win%
Cashmere Technical	2022–2026	9	3	1	5	16	20	33.3%
Dunedin City Royals (Note: Including one finals game win.)	2022–2026	10	2	1	6	10	21	20%
Halswell United	2025	2	2	0	0	20	1	100.0%
Nelson Suburbs	2023–2026	8	6	1	1	31	4	75%
NW United	2025-2026	4	3	0	1	16	5	75%
Otago University (Note: One game in 2023 season was never played.)	2023–2026	7	3	1	3	16	10	42.9%
Roslyn-Wakari	2022, 2024-2026	7	6	0	1	27	6	85.7%
University of Canterbury	2023, 2025-2026	6	5	0	1	16	10	83.3%
Overall	2022–2026	54	31	4	19	152	77	57.4%
South Island League Qualifying
Opposition	Span	Played	Won	Drawn	Lost	GF	GA	Win%
Cashmere Technical	2022–2024	5	3	1	1	13	7	60%
Halswell Christchurch United	2023	1	1	0	0	12	0	100.0%
Halswell United	2024	1	1	0	0	3	1	100.0%
FC Nomads United	2023	1	1	0	0	3	0	100.0%
Nelson Suburbs	2023–2024	2	1	1	0	4	2	50.0%
Nomads United	2022	3	3	0	0	18	1	100.0%
Nomads-Waimakariri United	2024	1	1	0	0	2	0	100.0%
Selwyn United	2023–2024	2	2	0	0	26	0	100.0%
Universities	2022–2024	5	4	1	0	17	1	80.0%
Overall	2022–2024	22	18	3	1	98	11	81.8%
Total	2022–2024	76	49	7	20	250	88	64.5%
Updated to: 30 August 2026

== Notes ==
Kate Sheppard Cup
Preceded by Three Kings United	Winner; 2013 Women's Knockout Cup	Succeeded by Glenfield Rovers
