= 2024 Kate Sheppard Cup =

Tournament details
- Country: New Zealand
- Dates: 25 April 2024 – 7 September 2024
- Teams: 53

Final positions
- Champions: Auckland United
- Runners-up: Western Springs

Tournament statistics
- Matches played: 46
- Goals scored: 289 (6.28 per match)

The 2024 Kate Sheppard Cup was New Zealand's women's 30th annual knockout football competition. This was the sixth year that the competition was known by the Kate Sheppard Cup, or New Zealand Football Foundation Kate Sheppard Cup for sponsorship purposes, after previously being known as the Women's Knockout Cup since its establishment. The cup had thirteen different winners lift the trophy over its 29-year history with Lynn-Avon United from Auckland being the most successful and Western Springs being the holders prior to the 2024 competition.

The 2024 competition had four rounds before quarter-finals, semi-finals, and final. Competition ran in three regions (northern, central/capital, southern) until the quarter-finals, from which stage the draw was open. In all, 53 teams entered the competition.

== Results ==
=== Preliminary round ===
All matches were played over Anzac weekend (25–28 April 2024).

Northern Region

25 April 2024	Waiuku (7)	1–13	Papakura City (4)	Waiuku
14:00	Cowley 85' (pen.)	Report	Yakas 2', 49'; Reddy 4', 35', 45'; Barroso 10', 26', 33', 56', 59' (pen.); Swales 30'; Ah Ching 71'; Kraakman 88'	Stadium: Massey Park; Referee: John Keen

28 April 2024	Bay Olympic (4)	1–6	Uni-Mount Bohemian (5)	New Lynn
13:00	Robinson 12'	Report	Hartwell 7', 42'; Jaques 40'; McKimm 48', 50', 65'	Stadium: Olympic Park; Referee: Haider Khan

Central Region

25 April 2024	Te Kotahitanga (3)	17–0	Stop Out (5)	Raumati Beach
14:00	Beetham 6', 10', 26', 53'; Wronski 22'; Addy 36', 37', 41', 44', 59', 66', 72'; Lenik 41'; Thompson 49' (o.g.); Howes 75', 79', 83'	Report		Stadium: Weka Park; Referee: Marten Kooij

=== Round 1 ===
All matches were played over the weekend of 10–13 May 2024.

Northern Region

11 May 2024	Papakura City (4)	0–6	Birkenhead United (3)	Papakura
18:00		Report		Stadium: McLennan Park; Referee: Avi Narayan

12 May 2024	Tauranga Blue Rovers (4)	0–4	Cambridge (4)	Greerton
11:00		Report		Stadium: Pemberton Park; Referee: Andrew Mitchell

12 May 2024	Waikato Unicol (4)	2–1	Onehunga Mangere United (4)	Hillcrest
13:00		Report		Stadium: Waikato University; Referee: Liam Weston

12 May 2024	Uni-Mount Bohemian (5)	3–0	Greenhithe (4)	Mount Wellington
13:00		Report		Stadium: Bill McKinlay Park; Referee: Roger Williams

12 May 2024	Lakes (4)	0–10	FC Tauranga Moana (3)	Ngongotahā
13:00		Report		Stadium: Tamarahi Reserve; Referee: Anna Harris

12 May 2024	Northland (4)	3–10	Franklin United (3)	Kensington
13:30		Report		Stadium: Trigg Arena; Referee: Lesly Moorhouse

Central Region

10 May 2024	Wellington United (2)	0–3	Wellington Phoenix Reserves (1)	Newtown
18:30		Report		Stadium: Newtown Park; Referee: Carl Tinsley

11 May 2024	Waterside Karori (2)	13–0	Brooklyn Northern United (3)	Berhampore
11:30		Report		Stadium: Martin Luckie Park; Referee: Jamie Cross

11 May 2024	Moturoa (2)	1–2	Palmerston North Marist (2)	Spotswood
13:00		Report		Stadium: Onuku Taipari Domain; Referee: Declan Gooda

12 May 2024	Miramar Rangers (3)	1–0	Victoria University (2)	Miramar
11:00		Report		Stadium: David Farrington Park; Referee: Cameron Hovell

12 May 2024	Te Kotahitanga (3)	5–1	North Wellington (3)	Paraparaumu
13:00		Report		Stadium: Mazengarb; Referee: Marten Kooij

12 May 2024	Island Bay United (3)	3–3 (a.e.t.) (2–3 p)	Upper Hutt City (3)	Island Bay
14:00		Report		Stadium: Wakefield Park; Referee: Wayne Kilgour

Nelson / Marlborough Bays Region

11 May 2024	FC Nelson (3)	w/o	Nelson Suburbs (2)	The Wood
14:00		Report		Stadium: Guppy Park

Canterbury Region

10 May 2024	Selwyn United (3)	0–5	Cashmere Technical (2)	Rolleston
19:30		Report		Stadium: Foster Park

11 May 2024	Halswell United (3)	1–2	Nomads-Waimakariri United (3)	Halswell
14:00		Report		Stadium: Halswell Domain

11 May 2024	Coastal Spirit (2)	4–0	University of Canterbury (3)	St Albans
14:00		Report		Stadium: English Park

Southern Region

11 May 2024	Northern (3)	0–4	Roslyn Wakari (2)	Dunedin North
12:00		Report		Stadium: Caledonian Ground; Referee: Allys Clipsham

11 May 2024	Green Island (3)	0–5 (a.e.t.)	Otago University (2)	Green Island
12:00		Report		Stadium: Sunnyvale Park; Referee: Caleb Marsh

11 May 2024	Dunedin City Royals (2)	11–0	Thistle FC	Lawyers Head
12:30		Report		Stadium: Tahuna Park; Referee: Aidan Broome

11 May 2024	Queens Park (3)	6–0	Grants Braes (4)	Invercargill
12:30		Report		Stadium: ILT Football Turf; Referee: Rose Hanley-Nickolls

=== Round 2 ===
Matches were played over King's Birthday weekend (31 May – 3 June).

Northern Region

31 May 2024	Uni-Mount Bohemian (5)	1–11	Hibiscus Coast (2)	Panmure
19:45		Report		Stadium: Bill McKinlay Park; Referee: Reza Al Rabea

1 June 2024	Fencibles United (2)	0–1	West Coast Rangers (2)	Pakuranga
12:00		Report		Stadium: Riverhills Park; Referee: Samuel Clement

1 June 2024	Franklin United (3)	6–3 (a.e.t.)	Waikato Unicol (4)	Drury
12:00		Report		Stadium: Drury Sports Complex; Referee: Kate Lambert

1 June 2024	FC Tauranga Moana (3)	1–3	Western Springs (2)	Mount Maunganui
13:00		Report		Stadium: Links Ave Reserve; Referee: Anna Harris

1 June 2024	Birkenhead United (3)	0–3	Ellerslie (2)	Beach Haven
14:00		Report		Stadium: Shepherds Park; Referee: Courtney Day

1 June 2024	Hamilton Wanderers (2)	3–4	Eastern Suburbs (2)	Chartwell
18:30		Report		Stadium: Porritt Stadium; Referee: Sarah Elyse Jones

2 June 2024	Northern Rovers (3)	3–3 (a.e.t.) (3–1 p)	Onehunga Sports (3)	Glenfield
13:00		Report		Stadium: McFetridge Park; Referee: Wilhelmus Duncker

3 June 2024	Auckland United (2)	7–0	Cambridge (4)	Mount Roskill
14:00		Report		Stadium: Keith Hay Park; Referee: Nathan Cox

Central Region

1 June 2024	Petone (2)	5–1	Upper Hutt City (3)	Petone
11:00		Report		Stadium: Petone Memorial Park; Referee: Paul Rushworth

1 June 2024	Palmerston North Marist (2)	4–1	Te Kotahitanga (3)	Palmerston North
11:30		Report		Stadium: Central Energy Trust Arena; Referee: Russell Jones

1 June 2024	Waterside Karori (2)	4–1	Miramar Rangers (3)	Berhampore
12:00		Report		Stadium: Martin Luckie Park; Referee: Samir Shemon

1 June 2024	Seatoun (2)	0–9	Wellington Phoenix Reserves (1)	Seatoun
13:00		Report		Stadium: Seatoun Park; Referee: Wayne Kilgour

Southern Region

31 May 2024	Roslyn Wakari (2)	0–2	Dunedin City Royals (2)	Dunedin North
19:00		Report		Stadium: Caledonian Ground; Referee: Lindsey Robinson

31 May 2024	Otago University (2)	3–0	Queens Park (3)	Dunedin North
19:30		Report		Stadium: Logan Park; Referee: Grace Teah

1 June 2024	Coastal Spirit (2)	0–6	Cashmere Technical (2)	Linwood
11:30		Report		Stadium: Linfield Park; Referee: Liam Hackston

1 June 2024	Nelson Suburbs (2)	w/o	Nomads-Waimakariri United (3)	Stoke
12:00		Report		Stadium: Saxton Fields

=== Round 3 ===
Matches were played over the weekend of 14 June – 16 June.

Northern Region

14 June 2024	Western Springs (2)	5–0	Hibiscus Coast (2)	Western Springs
19:00		Report		Stadium: Seddon Fields

15 June 2024	Ellerslie (2)	0–3	West Coast Rangers (2)	Ellerslie
14:00		Report		Stadium: Michaels Ave Reserve

15 June 2024	Eastern Suburbs (2)	0–4	Auckland United (2)	Kohimarama
13:00		Report		Stadium: Madills Farm

16 June 2024	Northern Rovers (3)	1–4	Franklin United (3)	Glenfield
13:00		Report		Stadium: McFetridge Park

Central Region

15 June 2024	Petone (2)	0–4	Wellington Phoenix Reserves (1)	Petone
11:00		Report		Stadium: Petone Memorial; Referee: Olivia Marlowe

15 June 2024	Palmerston North Marist (2)	1–2	Waterside Karori (2)	Palmerston North
11:30		Report		Stadium: Central Energy Trust Arena; Referee: Jono Galuszka

Southern Region

15 June 2024	Cashmere Technical (2)	7–0	Nelson Suburbs (2)	Woolston
12:00		Report		Stadium: Garrick Memorial Park

15 June 2024	Otago University (2)	0–3 (a.e.t.)	Dunedin City Royals (2)	Dunedin North
13:00		Report		Stadium: Logan Park; Referee: Fintan Walsh

=== Quarter-finals ===
Matches were played over the weekend of 5 – 7 July.

Northern Region

6 July 2024	Franklin United (3)	1–3	Western Springs (2)	Drury
13:00	Irvine 7'	Report	Lee 11' (yellow card) 46'; Hirano 67'; Lythe 71'; Bloomfield (yellow card) 85'	Stadium: Drury Sports Complex; Referee: Ujwaal Mudliar

6 July 2024	Auckland United (2)	5–1	West Coast Rangers (2)	Mount Roskill
17:00	Cook 2'; Canham 22'; Elliott 57'; Roche 64'; Vosper 71'	Report	Kete 30'	Stadium: Keith Hay Park; Referee: Othmane Jebli

Central Region

6 July 2023	Waterside Karori (2)	2–3	Wellington Phoenix Reserves (1)	Karori
13:00	Ross (yellow card) 80'; Kruszona 86'; Bryant 90+3'	Report	McCann 34' (pen.); Elliott 58', 77'	Stadium: Karori Park; Referee: Carl Tinsley

South Island

7 July 2023	Dunedin City Royals (2)	1–0	Cashmere Technical (2)	Tainui
13:00	Smith (yellow card) 66' (goal) 88'	Report	Keogan (yellow card) 76'	Stadium: Tahuna Park; Referee: Lindsey Robinson

=== Semi-finals ===
Matches were played on 17 August.

17 August 2024	Dunedin City Royals (2)	0–3	Western Springs (2)	Tainui
11:00	Rankin (yellow card) 77'	Report	Hirano 3'; Savage 5'; Burrows 24'; Dunn (yellow card) 90+6'	Stadium: Tahuna Park; Referee: Beth Rattray

17 August 2024	Wellington Phoenix Reserves (1)	1–2	Auckland United (2)	Taitā
13:00	Furnell 60'	Report	Green (yellow card) 39'; Vosper 88'; Harrison 90+9'	Stadium: Fraser Park; Referee: Jordan Boyd

=== Final ===
The final was played on 7 September 2024.

7 September 2024
16:00

Western Springs	0–1	Auckland United
		Roche 90'

North Harbour Stadium, Auckland
Referee: Sarah Jones

== Broadcsting rights ==
FIFA+ had the broadcasting rights for the 2024 season.

Round	Date	Teams	Kick-off	TV Channel
Round 2	1 June	Coastal Spirit v Cashmere Technical	11:30am	FIFA+
Round 3	15 June	Petone v Wellington Phoenix Reserves	11:00am	FIFA+
Quarter-final	6 July	Franklin United v Western Springs	1:00pm	FIFA+
Quarter-final	6 July	Waterside Karori v Wellington Phoenix Reserves	1:00pm	FIFA+
Quarter-final	6 July	Auckland United v West Coast Rangers	5:00pm	FIFA+
Quarter-final	7 July	Dunedin City Royals v Cashmere Technical	1:00pm	FIFA+
Semi-final	17 August	Dunedin City Royals v Western Springs	11:00am	FIFA+
Semi-final	17 August	Wellington Phoenix Reserves v Auckland United	1:00pm	FIFA+
Final	7 September	Western Springs v Auckland United	4:00pm	FIFA+
