= 2023 Kate Sheppard Cup =

Tournament details
- Country: New Zealand
- Dates: 22 April 2023 – 10 September 2023
- Teams: 57

Final positions
- Champions: Western Springs
- Runners-up: Wellington United

The 2023 Kate Sheppard Cup is New Zealand's women's 29th annual knockout football competition. This is the fifth year that the competition is known by the Kate Sheppard Cup, or New Zealand Football Foundation Kate Sheppard Cup for sponsorship purposes, after previously been known as the Women's Knockout Cup since its establishment. The cup has had thirteen different winners lift the trophy over its 28-year history with Lynn-Avon United from Auckland being the most successful and Auckland United being the current holders from the 2022 season.

The 2023 competition has four rounds before quarter-finals, semi-finals, and a final. Competition will run in three regions (northern, central/capital, southern) until the quarter-finals, from which stage the draw will be open. In all, 57 teams entered the competition this year.

== Results ==
=== Preliminary round ===
All matches were played over the Anzac weekend of 22–25 April 2023.

Northern Region

22 April 2023	Papakura City (6)	0–2	Onerahi (5)	Papakura
13:00		Report	Hokai 9' (o.g.); Bennetto 68'	Stadium: McLennan Park; Referee: Struan Millward

23 April 2023	Northern United (5)	0–6	Melville United (4)	Hamilton
11:00		Report	Tiller 18'; Hwang 42', 72'; Clark (yellow card) 53'; Bennett 85', 90+1'; Austin 90'	Stadium: Korikori Park; Referee: Mark Owens

23 April 2023	Waikato Unicol (4)	1–2	Cambridge (5)	Hamilton
13:00	Bahr 45'	Report	Ingram 9'; Orr (yellow card) 45'; Churton 46'	Stadium: Waikato University; Referee: Perry Kendall

Mainland Region

25 April 2023	Richmond Athletic (4)	2 - 1	FC Nelson (4)	Richmond
14:00	Allen 72'; Cook 75'	Report	Taranchokov 25'	Stadium: Jubilee Park; Referee: Peter Cobeldick

=== Round One ===
All matches were played over the week 10–17 May 2023.

Northern Region

13 May 2023	Lakes FC (4)	8–3	Beachlands Maraetai (4)	Rotorua
14:00	Harvey 3'; Barclay 5', 65'; Doherty 9', 32', 60', 72'; MacCormick 45+5'	Report	van Rensburg 30', 57'; Ripley 50'	Stadium: Tamarahi Reserve

14 May 2023	Cambridge (5)	0–5	Onehunga Sports (3)	Cambridge
13:00		Report	Boonekamp 45+2'; Stevenson 55'; Blakeborough 64', 71'; Bolland 73'	Stadium: John Kerkhof Park

14 May 2023	Tauranga City (3)	5–1	Melville United (4)	Tauranga
13:00	McCloskey 19'; Hingston 52'; Osborne 58'; Golding 78'; Benge 82'	Report	Clark 72'	Stadium: Links Avenue Reserve

14 May 2023	Central United (3)	3–1 (a.e.t.)	Tauranga Blue Rovers (4)	Auckland
14:00	Trowill 77', 120'; Abbott 100'	Report	Cornwell 22'	Stadium: Kiwitea Street

14 May 2023	Manukau United (3)	2–0	Onerahi (5)	Auckland
14:00	Leota 8'; de Jong 31'	Report		Stadium: Centre Park

14 May 2023	Birkenhead United (4)	0–0 (a.e.t.) (3–1 p)	Franklin United (3)	Auckland
14:00		Report		Stadium: Shepherds Park
	Penalties
	Lydon (penalty scored); Herbst (penalty scored); Rempe (penalty scored)		Blyth (penalty scored)

14 May 2023	Bay Olympic (4)	1–7	Otumoetai (3)	Auckland
14:00	Gwin 53'	Report	Carter 13', 24'; Duncan 15', 64', 74'; Smith 19'; Carr 38'	Stadium: Olympic Park

14 May 2023	Fencibles United (3)	7–0	Greenhithe (4)	Auckland
14:00	Berry 6', 15'; Brazier 8'; Steele 16'; Harper 35' (o.g.); Gillion 48'; Byers 90'	Report		Stadium: Riverhills Park

Northern Region Round One Byes; Eastern Suburbs, West Coast Rangers, Auckland United, Ellerslie, Western Springs, Hibiscus Coast, Northern Rovers, Hamilton Wanderers.

Central Region

13 May 2023	New Plymouth Rangers (3)	0–4	Palmerston North Marist (2)	New Plymouth
13:00		Report	Dowsing 5', 48'; Owen 16'; Boxall 44'	Stadium: Merrilands Domain

14 May 2023	Havelock North Wanderers (3)	w/o	Kaitake (4)	Havelock North
11:00				Stadium: Guthrie Park
Note: Havelock North Wanderers win by default.

14 May 2023	Massey University (4)	1–2	Moturoa (3)	Palmerston North
13:00	Galloway 40'	Report	Toscani 4' (pen.); Christiansen 90+2'	Stadium: Massey University

Capital Region

13 May 2023	Petone (2)	9–0	Brooklyn Northern United (3)	Lower Hutt
11:00	]: Otte 37'; Shailer 42'; Gill 45', 75', 77'; Boobyer 52', 59'; Price 89'	Report		Stadium: Petone Memorial Park

13 May 2023	Waterside Karori (2)	12–0	North Wellington (2)	Wellington
11:30	Kruszona 6'; Bacon 12', 63', 84'; Morton 19'; Ward 20', 28', 67'; Ramsay 38', 41'; Bryant 58'; Christie 64'	Report		Stadium: Karori Park

13 May 2023	Victoria University (2)	0–1	Seatoun (2)	Wellington
14:00	Armitage (yellow card) 90+23'	Report	Kabayama 90+23'	Stadium: Boyd Wilson Field

14 May 2023	Lower Hutt City (4)	1–8	Miramar Rangers (4)	Lower Hutt
14:00	Pilcher 6'	Report	Watkins 2', 43'; McIntrye 20'; Phillips 38'; Wilson 50'; Yepes Osorio 82'; King 84'; Kilkolly 90'	Stadium: Fraser Park

14 May 2023	Kapiti Coast United (3)	0–3	Wellington United (2)	Paraparaumu
14:00		Report	Ohlsson 5'; Gilchrist 31'; Olliver-Bell 72'	Stadium: Weka Park

Mainland Region

10 May 2023	Nomads United (3)	1–7	Cashmere Technical (3)	Christchurch
19:00	Bennett (yellow card) 22'; Summerlee 84'	Report	Phillips 7', 37'; Kench 25', 45'; Roche 51', 53', 61'	Stadium: Avonhead Park; Referee: Courteney Bremner

13 May 2023	Coastal Spirit (3)	1–0	Universities (3)	Christchurch
12:00	Morrow 43'	Report		Stadium: English Park

17 May 2023	Nelson Suburbs (3)	2–0	Richmond Athletic (4)	Nelson
19:00	Smith 30'; Pugh 87'	Report		Stadium: Wakefield Park; Referee: Maurice John Llewellin

Southern Region

13 May 2023	Northern (2)	1–2	Mosgiel (2)	Dunedin
14:00	Williamson (yellow card) 31'; Sweeney 76'; Fleener (yellow card) 77'	Report	Smith 32'; Scherp 45+6'; Hawker (yellow card) 70'	Stadium: Forrester Park

13 May 2023	Dunedin City Royals (2)	6–0	Green Island (2)	Dunedin
14:00	Whittaker 16'; Dias 40'; Smith 49'; Mackay-Wright 56'; Gray 71'; Collin 90'	Report		Stadium: Logan Park

South Island Round One Byes; Halswell United, Otago University, Roslyn-Wakari.

=== Round Two ===
All matches were played across the 30th May to the 5th of June 2023.

Northern Region

4 June 2023	Otumoetai (3)	2–1	Onehunga Sports (3)	Tauranga
12:00	Carter 25'; Muspratt 77'	Report	Carter (yellow card) 4'; Stevenson 14'; Stevenson (yellow card) 90+1' (yellow-red card) 90+1'	Stadium: Fergusson Park; Referee: A. Mitchell

4 June 2023	Fencibles United (3)	4–1	Tauranga City (3)	Auckland
13:00	Byers 42'; Turley 76'; Loxton 81', 86'	Report	Browne 72'	Stadium: William Green Domain; Referee: B. Peach

4 June 2023	Lakes FC (4)	0–12	Western Springs (1)	Rotorua
13:00		Report	Garcia 2', 11', 17', 65', 85'; Taitimu 5', 24'; A. Vedder 9' (o.g.); Hill 10', 32'; Jerez 46'; Savage 49'	Stadium: Tamarahi Reserve; Referee: A. Cobby

4 June 2023	Eastern Suburbs (1)	10–0	Northern Rovers (2)	Auckland
13:00	O'Brien 3'; Atkins 13', 78'; Cooper 14'; Brooke 25'; Benson 27', 71'; Lucas 45+2'; Sheed 46'; Nishizono 55'	Report		Stadium: Madills Farm; Referee: M. Biggar

4 June 2023	West Coast Rangers (2)	1–4	Ellerslie (1)	Auckland
14:00	McIntosh 16'	Report	Fa'afua 10', 30'; Trudgen 26'; Pilley 43'	Stadium: Fred Taylor Park; Referee: G. Lochrie

5 June 2023	Central United (3)	0–5	Hamilton Wanderers (2)	Auckland
13:00		Report	Hooper 19'; Byrne 27'; Mooar 29'; Trebes 43'; Taylor 79'	Stadium: Kiwitea Street; Referee: T. Kawana-Waugh

5 June 2023	Birkenhead United (4)	2–3	Manukau United (3)	Auckland
14:00	Govind 40'; Rempe (yellow card) 80'; England 87'	Report	Kaur 12'; Barroso 12'; de Jong 47' (pen.)	Stadium: Shepherds Park; Referee: K. Lambert

5 June 2023	Auckland United (1)	3–0	Hibiscus Coast (2)	Auckland
17:00	Nathan 34'; Knott 67'; Elliot 70'	Report		Stadium: Keith Hay Park; Referee: W. Duncker

Central Region

3 June 2023	Petone (2)	2–1	Waterside Karori (2)	Wellington
11:30	Jefferies 9'; Boobyer 30'	Report	Ranta (yellow card) 58'; Christie 82'	Stadium: Petone Memorial Park; Referee: D. Barry

3 June 2023	Palmerston North Marist (2)	7–0	Havelock North Wanderers (3)	Palmerston North
11:30	Owen 26', 86'; Gurnick 50'; Falloon 57'; Boxall 65', 86', 88'	Report		Stadium: Central Energy Trust Arena; Referee: A. Muhammad

4 June 2023	Moturoa (3)	0–4	Wellington United (2)	New Plymouth
13:00	Lucinsky (yellow card) 86'	Report	Robertson 18', 36', 57'; Grange (yellow card) 43'; Ohlsson 45+1'; Ohlsson (yellow card) 90+1'	Stadium: Onuku Taipari Domain; Referee: K. Evans

4 June 2023	Miramar Rangers (4)	1–2	Seatoun (2)	Wellington
14:00	Watkins 34'	Report	Kabayama 17'; Corbett 19'	Stadium: David Farrington Park; Referee: C. Hovell

South Island

30 May 2023	Otago University (2)	3–0	Mosgiel (2)	Dunedin
19:30	Wood 5'; McCormick 15'; Marvin 47'	Report		Stadium: Logan Park; Referee: W. Van Gorp

3 June 2023	Coastal Spirit (3)	4–2 (a.e.t.)	Cashmere Technical (3)	Christchurch
11:00	Nicholson 55', 97'; Stewart 69'; Hepburn 104'	Report	Phillips 45'; Dominikovich 85'	Stadium: Linfield Park; Referee: M. Field

3 June 2023	Roslyn-Wakari (2)	1–3	Dunedin City Royals (2)	Dunedin
12:00	Fitchett 89'	Report	Mackay-Wright 26'; Whittaker 48'; Dias 60'	Stadium: Ellis Park; Referee: D. Cameron

4 June 2023	Nelson Suburbs (3)	6–0	Halswell United (3)	Nelson
14:00	Bouterey 4'; Pugh 11'; Abbott 21', 48'; Rynvos 84'; McPhie 90'	Report		Stadium: Saxton Fields; Referee: A. Valenga Guimaraes

=== Round Three ===
All matches were played from the 14th to 18 June 2023.

Northern Region

16 June 2023	Fencibles United	3–2	Otumoetai	Auckland
19:00	Berry 16'; Gillion 25', 38'	Report	Duncan 8'; Muspratt 77'	Stadium: William Green Domain; Referee: K. Davis

18 June 2023	Hamilton Wanderers	1–3	Eastern Suburbs (1)	Hamilton
13:00	Ollington 2'	Report	Mettam 3'; Cooper 11'; Jackson 49'	Stadium: Ashurst Park; Referee: A. Castro

18 June 2023	Manukau United	0–6	Ellerslie (1)	Auckland
14:00		Report	Gow 2'; Aitken 23'; Oosterbeek 65'; Cunningham-Lee 66'; Trudgen 79'; Barclay 89'	Stadium: Centre Park; Referee: B. Rattray

18 June 2023	Western Springs (1)	3–0	Auckland United (1)	Auckland
17:30	Savage 20'; Robberts 45+3' (o.g.); Jervis 54'	Report		Stadium: Seddon Fields; Referee: A. Wilson

Central Region

17 June 2023	Wellington United	3–0	Seatoun	Wellington
12:00	Ohlsson 5'; Olliver-Bell 40'; Robertson 69'	Report		Stadium: Rugby League Park; Referee: S. Shemon

17 June 2023	Palmerston North Marist	1–2	Petone	Palmerston North
14:00	Boxall 50'; Owen (yellow card) 74'	Report	Boobyer 45+1', 74'	Stadium: Central Trust Arena; Referee: R. Jones

South Island

14 June 2023	Dunedin City Royals	3–1	Otago University	Dunedin
19:00	Collin 40', 64'; Mackay-Wright 78'	Report	Nicolson 14'; Tuatagaloa (yellow card) 55' (yellow-red card) 77'	Stadium: Logan Park; Referee: G. Teah

18 June 2023	Nelson Suburbs	0–6	Coastal Spirit	Nelson
11:00		Report	Morrow 32', 90'; Dabner 41'; Stewart 59', 80'; Keogan 85'	Stadium: Saxton Fields; Referee: A. Valenga Guimaraes

=== Quarter Finals ===
Northern Region

6 July 2023	Ellerslie (1)	2–4	Eastern Suburbs (1)	Auckland
18:30	Cunningham-Lee 22'; Oosterbeek 90+6'	Report	Jackson 3', 37'; Cooper 13'; Atkins 53'; Caird (yellow card) 87'	Stadium: Ngahue Reserve; Referee: B. Rattray

9 July 2023	Western Springs (1)	3–1	Fencibles United	Auckland
15:00	Jerez 23'; Garcia 72', 83'	Report	Marais 42'	Stadium: Seddon Fields; Referee: S. Clement

Central Region

8 July 2023	Wellington United	2–1	Petone	Wellington
12:00	Deane 15'; Gilchrist 87'	Report	Gill 48'	Stadium: Rugby League Park; Referee: M. Lauridsen

South Island

9 July 2023	Dunedin City Royals	0–1	Coastal Spirit	Dunedin
12:30		Report	Whinham 12'; Keogan (yellow card) 23'	Stadium: Logan Park; Referee: G. Teah

=== Semi Finals ===
13 August 2023	Western Springs (1)	5–1 (a.e.t.)	Coastal Spirit	Auckland
14:00	Mayo 18'; Jacob (yellow card) 84'; Hill (yellow card) 88'; Savage 96', 118'; Lee 105+2'; Lythe 109'	Report	Hepburn 68'	Stadium: Seddon Fields; Referee: L. Robinson

20 August 2023	Eastern Suburbs (1)	0–1	Wellington United	Auckland
14:00		Report	Alder 70'	Stadium: Madills Farm; Referee: B. Rattray

=== Final ===
The final was played on 10 September 2023.

10 September 2023
13:00

Wellington United (2)	1–2	Western Springs (1)
Roberson 55'	Report	Tawharu 38'; Jerez 89'

North Harbour Stadium, Auckland
Referee: Anna-Marie Keighley
