= Women's South Island League =

- Founded: 2022; 4 years ago (as South Island Championship); 2023; 3 years ago (as Women's South Island League)
- Country: New Zealand
- Confederation: OFC (Oceania)
- Number of clubs: 8
- Level on pyramid: 2
- Feeder to: Women's National League; 2026 onwards
- Relegation to: Canterbury Women's Premier League; Southern Women's Premier League
- Domestic cup: Kate Sheppard Cup
- League cup: Reta Fitzpatrick Cup (Mainland Football teams only)
- Current champions: Cashmere Technical (3rd title) (2026)
- Most championships: Cashmere Technical (3 titles)
- Website: Mainland Football
- Current: 2026 Women's South Island League

The Women's South Island League is an amateur status league competition run by Southern Football and Mainland Football for Association football clubs located in the South Island of New Zealand. It is at the second level of New Zealand Football behind the national association based New Zealand Women's National League, and the highest level of club based football available to teams within the region.

In March 2023, New Zealand Football announced a change to the Women's National League to move to a fully club-based model, the same as the three regional leagues of the men's competition, when club capability allows. Targeted for 2026, South Island clubs will be competing in the Women's National League. To support this, Mainland and Southern federations will jointly deliver a South Island league, and it will act as a pilot for future incorporation into the league, as the Southern League does for the men's competition.

== Current clubs ==
Location of clubs in the South Island for the 2026 Women's South Island League Season
Location of clubs in Christchurch District for the 2026 Women's South Island League Season
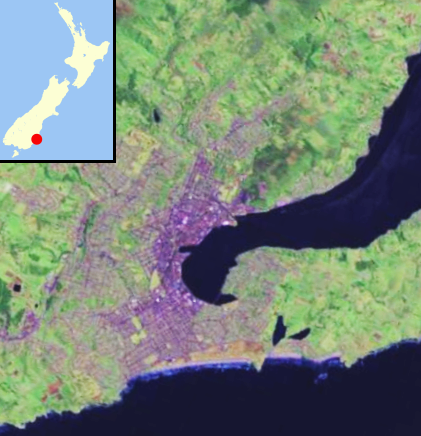
Location of clubs in Dunedin District for the 2026 Women's South Island League Season

As of 2026 season

Team	Home ground	Location	2025 season
Cashmere Technical	Garrick Memorial Park	Woolston, Christchurch	3rd
Coastal Spirit	Tāne Norton Park	Linwood, Christchurch	4th
Dunedin City Royals	Tahuna Park	Tainui, Dunedin	1st
Nelson Suburbs	Saxton Field	Stoke, Nelson	7th
Nomads–Waimakariri United	Tulett Park	Casebrook, Christchurch	8th
Nomads–Waimakariri United	Kendal Park	Kaiapoi	8th
Otago University	Football Turf	Dunedin North, Dunedin	2nd
Roslyn-Wakari	Football Turf	Dunedin North, Dunedin	6th
University of Canterbury	English Park (Note: Ilam Fields doesn't met NZF Pitch Regulations)	St Albans, Christchurch	5th

=== Promotion and relegation ===
As of 2025 season

Season	Club	Federation	Promoted Club
2022	Roslyn-Wakari	Southern Football	—N/a
2023	University of Canterbury	Mainland Football	Roslyn-Wakari
2024	—N/a		Halswell United; Nomads–Waimakariri United; University of Canterbury
2025	Halswell United	Mainland Football	—N/a

== Top scorers ==
The following list is from the 2022 season onwards after New Zealand Football changed the football league system in New Zealand. From 2026 onwards, the Women's South Island League will act as a qualifier league to the Women's National League.

Season	Top scorer(s)	Club(s)	Goals
2022	(New Zealand) Isla McPherson	Coastal Spirit SAS	4
2023	(New Zealand) Britney-Lee Nicholson	Coastal Spirit SAS	15
2024	(New Zealand) Anna McPhie	Cashmere Technical	9
2025	(New Zealand) Britney-Lee Nicholson	Coastal Spirit	22
2026	(New Zealand) Margarida Dias	Cashmere Technical	20

== Records ==
The following records are from the 2022 season onwards after New Zealand Football changed the football league system in New Zealand. From 2026 onwards, the Women's South Island League will act as a qualifier league to the Women's National League. Any records from 2022 to 2024 aren't included. The records are up to date as of the end of the 2026 season.

- Most wins in a season: 15 – Dunedin City Royals (2025)
- Fewest wins in a season: 1 – Halswell United (2025)
- Most draws in a season: 6 – Roslyn Wakari (2026)
- Fewest draws in a season: 0
  - Cashmere Technical (2025)
  - Coastal Spirit (2025)
  - Dunedin City Royals (2025)
- Most defeats in a season: 13 – Halswell United (2025)
- Fewest defeats in a season: 0 – Cashmere Technical (2026
- Most goals scored in a season: 64 – Dunedin City Royals (2025)
- Fewest goals scored in a season: 9 – NW United (2026)
- Most goals conceded in a season: 92 – Halswell United (2025)
- Fewest goals conceded in a season: 4 – Cashmere Technical (2026)
- Most points in a season: 45 – Dunedin City Royals (2025)
- Fewest points in a season: 5 – Halswell United (2025)
- Highest goal difference: +55 – Dunedin City Royals (2025)
- Lowest goal difference: -82 – Halswell United (2025)
- Biggest home win: 9 goals – Cashmere Technical 9–0 NW United (6 June 2026)
- Biggest away win: 13 goals – Halswell United 0–13 Coastal Spirit (23 August 2025)
- Highest scoring match: 13 goals – Halswell United 0–13 Coastal Spirit (23 August 2025)
- Biggest title-winning margin: – 12 points, 2026, Cashmere Technical (40 points) over Dunedin City Royals (28 points)

=== Past champions ===
- 2022 – Coastal Spirit SAS
- 2023 – Cashmere Technical
- 2024 – Cashmere Technical
- 2025 – Dunedin City Royals
- 2026 – Cashmere Technical

=== Performance by champions ===
Club	Location	Titles	Runners up	Last title
Cashmere Technical	Woolston, Christchurch	3	1	2026
Dunedin City Royals	Dunedin North, Dunedin	1	3	2025
Coastal Spirit SAS	Linwood, Christchurch	1	—N/a	2022
Otago University	Dunedin North, Dunedin	—N/a	1	—N/a
