= Otago University AFC =

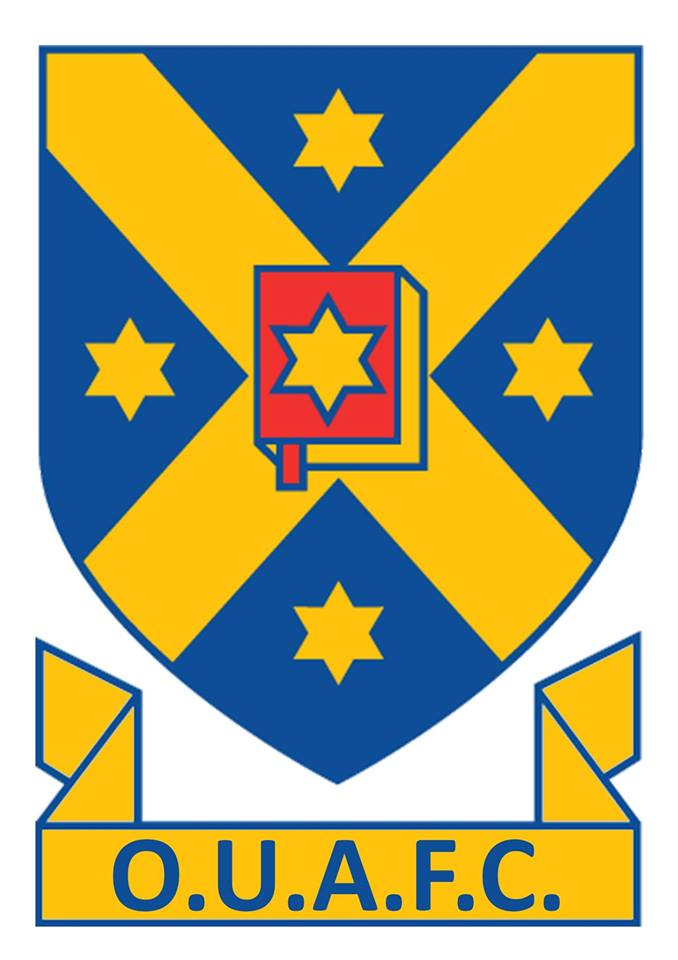
- Full name: Otago University Association Football Club
- Nicknames: Varsity, Uni, OUAFC
- Founded: 1939
- Ground: Logan Park, Dunedin North
- President: Jerry Mackey
- Coach: Jerry Mackey
- League: Southern Premier League
- 2026: Southern Premier League, 3rd of 9
- Website: https://www.ouafc.org/
Home colours	Away colours	Third colours

Otago University AFC is an amateur association football club in Dunedin, New Zealand. The men's first team competes in the Southern Premier League and has previously competed in the Southern League. The Women's First Team competes in the Women's South Island League.

== History ==
The club is affiliated with the Otago University Students' Association, and not directly affiliated to the University of Otago in Dunedin, New Zealand; it is one of the oldest clubs associated with the University of Otago, established in 1939. They are based at Logan Park in an area immediately beside the university campus, and play their home fixtures at the nearby Caledonian Ground. The men's first team also participates in the Chatham Cup, New Zealand's premier knockout tournament. The Women's First team competes in the Kate Sheppard Cup. As a member of Southern Football, the club was also affiliated with Southern United of the New Zealand Football Championship.

The clubs best run in the Chatham Cup was in 2014 where they made it to the final 16 before losing 0–1 to Dunedin Technical. However in the 2021 edition, the club made the quarter-finals for the first time, facing North Shore United away.. In the 2024 Chatham Cup, they repeated that feat, advancing to the quarterfinals where they lost 5-1 against Auckland City FC.

In the Kate Sheppard Cup, the club reached the quarterfinals of the 2025, bowing out to Cashmere Technical in a 2-1 defeat.

The club has also participated in the New Zealand Women's National League in 2026, accepting an invitation from Southern United to participate as SU Otago University, and secured an historic first victory at that level with a 1-0 win over Canterbury United Pride.

The club strip is traditionally the Otago region colours of blue and varsity gold, the away strip is traditionally baby blue.

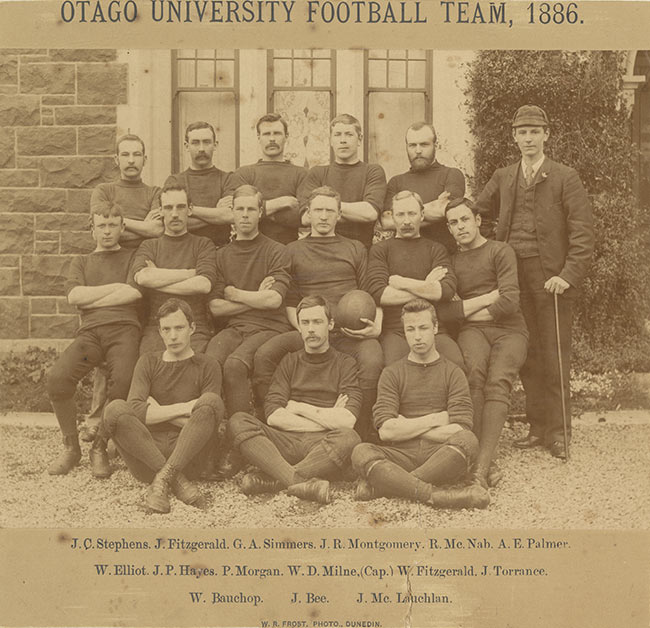
Photo of the first Otago University Football Team, 1886

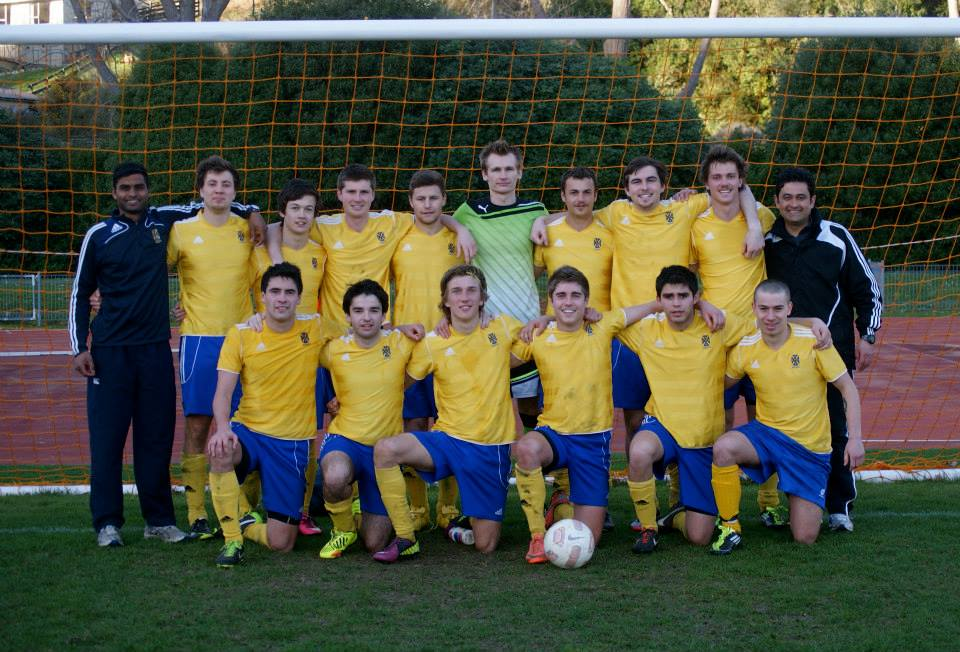
Otago University Men's first XI, 2014 wearing home strip

== Season by season record (Men) ==
2021 (National League)
2022- (Southern Premiership)

Season	Southern League/Southern Premiership									National League									Chatham Cup	Top scorer	
Season	P	W	D	L	F	A	GD	Pts	Pos	P	W	D	L	F	A	GD	Pts	Pos	Chatham Cup	Name	Goals
2021	7	4	0	3	14	15	-1	12	4th	Did not qualify									QF	(New Zealand) Aidan Barbour-Ryan	4
2022	18	4	1	13	27	42	-15	13	9th	Ineligible to qualify									R2	(Philippines) Tristan Mendoza, (New Zealand) Simba Muwunganirwa	6
2023	18	5	3	10	30	37	-5	18	7th	Ineligible to qualify									R3	(New Zealand) Jack Julian, (New Zealand) George Willett	6
2024	18	9	4	5	33	33	0	31	4th	Ineligible to qualify									QF	(New Zealand) Ben Campbell	6
2025	16	10	4	2	52	23	+29	34	2nd	Ineligible to qualify									R3	(New Zealand) Ashton Hodson	12
2026	16	8	3	5	36	25	+11	27	3rd	Ineligible to qualify									R3	(New Zealand) Blake Fairbairn	8

== Season by season record (Women) ==
2023– (Women's South Island League)

Season	Women's South Island League									Kate Sheppard Cup	Top scorer	
Season	P	W	D	L	F	A	GD	Pts	Pos	Kate Sheppard Cup	Name	Goals
2023	9	3	1	5	12	34	-22	10	4th	R3	(New Zealand) Amy Hislop	5
2024	10	3	2	5	12	17	-5	11	4th	R3	(New Zealand) Aynsley Martin	3
2025	16	12	1	3	41	13	+28	37	2nd	QF	(New Zealand) Georgia Nixon	10
2026	14	7	3	4	20	12	+8	24	3rd	R3	(New Zealand) Georgia Kennedy, (New Zealand) Jemma McCormick	4
