= Dunedin City Royals FC =

Dunedin City Royals
- Full name: Dunedin City Royals Football Club
- Nickname: Royals
- Founded: 2021
- Ground: Tahuna Park and Caledonian Ground, Dunedin, New Zealand
- Chairman: Matthew Bray
- Coach: Blair Scoullar (men's); Kris Ridley (women's)
- League: Southern League
- 2026: Southern League, 8th of 10
- Website: https://www.dunedincityroyalsfc.com/
Home colours

Dunedin City Royals Football Club is an amateur football club based in Dunedin, New Zealand. The compete in the Southern League.

== History ==
Formed in 2021, originally as South City Royals, the club is an initiative between existing Southern Dunedin based clubs, Caversham, Dunedin Technical, Hereweka Junior football club, and Melchester Rovers Junior football club forming a ‘hub’ where certain activities are conducted under a single team. From the 2022 season, the club changed their name and logo to Dunedin City Royals. The team plays in light blue and white which is said to represent the teams location and "reflected the sea, the sky and the waves."

Dunedin City Royals plays in the FootballSouth Premier League and the Southern League, one of three qualifying leagues for the New Zealand National League.

The club also competes in the Chatham Cup, New Zealand's premier knockout tournaments for men. The team received a bye in the 2021 Chatham Cup for the preliminary round so their first game of the competition was in Round 1 against follow FootballSouth Premier League team Roslyn-Wakari, which South City Royals won 3–1. They next faced another local team Mosgiel in Round 2, needing extra time to beat them 2–1.

In 2025, the club won the Women's South Island League title for the first time.. Due to consistently strong performances in the Women's South Island League, the club has qualified for and will compete in the 2027 Women's National League.

== Season by season record (Men) ==
2021– (National League)

Season	Southern League									National League									Chatham Cup	Top scorer	
Season	P	W	D	L	F	A	GD	Pts	Pos	P	W	D	L	F	A	GD	Pts	Pos	Chatham Cup	Name	Goals
2021	7	4	0	3	15	16	-1	12	3rd	Did not qualify									R4	(New Zealand) Ryan Fleming	6
2022	18	10	1	7	46	35	+11	31	4th	Did not qualify									QF	(New Zealand) En Watanabe	10
2023	18	8	5	5	44	29	+15	29	4th	Did not qualify									R2	(New Zealand) Connor Neil	12
2024	17	6	1	10	27	46	-19	19	7th	Did not qualify									R4	(New Zealand) Will Turner	6
2025	18	7	5	6	39	31	+8	26	7th	Did not qualify									R4	(New Zealand) Connor Neil	8
2026	18	5	1	12	15	41	-26	16	8th	Did not qualify									R4	(New Zealand) Kazik Swain	4

== Season by season record (Women) ==
2023– (Women's South Island League)

Season	Women's South Island League									Kate Sheppard Cup	Top scorer	
Season	P	W	D	L	F	A	GD	Pts	Pos	Kate Sheppard Cup	Name	Goals
2023	10	6	2	2	30	11	+19	20	2nd	QF	(New Zealand) Shontelle Smith	7
2024	10	8	1	1	25	4	+43	25	2nd	SF	(New Zealand) Rose Morton	6
2025	16	15	0	1	64	9	+55	45	1st	R3	(New Zealand) Amy Hislop	19
2026	14	9	1	4	39	15	+24	28	2nd	QF	(New Zealand) Georgia Nixon	11

Season	League	Div	P	W	D	L	GF	GA	GD	Pts	League Position	Kate Sheppard Cup	Top scorer	
Season	League	Div	P	W	D	L	GF	GA	GD	Pts	League Position	Kate Sheppard Cup	Name	Goals
2027	National League	1	To be determined								TBD			

== Honours ==
League

- Women's South Island League (1): 2024
- Southern Premiership (2): 2021, 2022 (Note: Won by Dunedin City Royals reserves)
- Women's Southern Premiership (2): 2022, 2023
