= St Albans Shirley FC =

- Full name: St Albans Shirley Football Club
- Founded: 1973
- Ground: St Albans Park, St Albans
- League: Mainland Division 1
- 2026: Mainland Division 1, 6th of 10
- Website: https://sasfootball.club/

St Albans Shirley FC is an association football club in Christchurch, New Zealand. The Men's First team competes in the Mainland Division 1, and has previously competed in the Canterbury Championship League. The Women's First team competes in a joint enterprise with Coastal Spirit, where they compete the Women's South Island Qualifying League and were successful to make it into the South Island League.

The club is based at St Albans Park, around the road from English Park. Between 1988–1991 and 1994, the club participated in the Southern League Two North. The men's first team also participates in the Chatham Cup, New Zealand's premier knockout tournament and the English Cup, Canterbury's knockout tournament. The Women's First team competes in the Kate Sheppard Cup, the Women's version of the Chatham Cup, and the Reta Fitzpatrick Cup, the Women's version of the English Cup.

The clubs best run in the Chatham Cup was in 1982 where they made it to the Third Round, before losing 1–3 to Cashmere Wanderers. The best run in the Kate Sheppard Cup was in 2023, where Coastal Spirit SASFC made it to the semi finals, before losing 5–1 to Western Springs.

With the men's first team being in the community leagues, they are eligible to compete in the Mainland Charity Cups. In the 2024 Whero Cup, they drew 4–4 to Canterbury Championship League side University of Canterbury's Third XI and lost 5–6 on penalties in the first round.
