= Cashmere Technical FC =

New Zealand football club

- Full name: Cashmere Technical Football Club
- Founded: 2012; 14 years ago
- Ground: Garrick Memorial Park, Christchurch
- Coach: Tom Schwarz
- League: National League
- 2026: Southern League, 1st of 10; National League, TBD
- Website: ctfc.co.nz
Home colours	Away colours

Cashmere Technical is an association football club based in Christchurch, New Zealand. It was formed in early 2012 from the merger of two of the city's premier teams, Cashmere Wanderers and Woolston Technical. The two clubs had agreed to work together in early 2011, and the 2011 Christchurch earthquake which devastated their home city and resulted in the loss of many playing facilities hastened their merger into a combined side.

Cashmere Technical currently play in the National League, and have won the Chatham Cup twice as Cashmere but also once as Christchurch Technical Old Boys.

== Club history ==
=== Christchurch Technical ===
Christchurch Technical was formed in 1923 as Christchurch Technical Old Boys. The club changed its name to Christchurch Technical in 1968. It was also known temporarily as Christchurch City, when Woolston Working Men's Club and Christchurch Technical briefly merged to play in the National Soccer League in 2000 and 2001.

=== Woolston Working Men's Club ===
Was an association football club based in Woolston, Christchurch, New Zealand. It was formed in 1951 as Waterside, before the name was changed to Woolston Working Men's Club in 1969. The team played in the New Zealand National Soccer League in 1978 and 1981, being relegated back into the regional leagues at the end of both seasons.

=== Woolston Technical ===
Woolston Technical was formed in 2007, as a result of a merger between of Christchurch Technical and Woolston Working Men's Club. The two sides had previously merged briefly between 2000 and 2002, playing under the name Christchurch City.

=== Cashmere Wanderers ===
Cashmere Wanderers was formed in 1951 as Atlantis AFC, named for its origins among emigrants to New Zealand aboard the Shaw Savill Line ship Atlantis, which arrived in Lyttelton in 1950. In 1961, the club changed its name to Wanderers to reflect its nickname at the time. Then in 1967 it became the Cashmere Wanderers.

=== Cashmere Technical ===
In 2012 the clubs of Woolston Technical and Cashmere Wanderers merged to form Cashmere Technical. In 2013, the club would go on to complete a treble, winning the Mainland Premier League, Christchurch Cup and the national Chatham Cup. The club would win the Mainland Premier League again in 2014 and 2015, as well winning the Chatham Cup again in 2014.

== Season by season record (Men) ==
2021– (National League)

Season	Southern League									National League									English Cup	Chatham Cup	Top scorer	
Season	P	W	D	L	F	A	GD	Pts	Pos	P	W	D	L	F	A	GD	Pts	Pos	English Cup	Chatham Cup	Name	Goals
2021	7	6	0	1	25	7	+18	18	1st	5	3	0	2	8	4	+4	9	3rd	W	W	(Republic of Ireland) Garbhan Coughlan	36
2022	18	16	1	1	79	20	+59	49	2nd	9	4	0	5	19	18	+1	12	7th	W	QF	(Republic of Ireland) Garbhan Coughlan	43
2023	18	13	3	2	66	27	+39	42	2nd	9	4	1	4	24	24	0	13	5th	2nd	R4	(Republic of Ireland) Garbhan Coughlan	44
2024	18	15	2	1	90	19	+71	47	1st	9	2	3	4	16	18	−2	9	8th	2nd	R2	(Republic of Ireland) Garbhan Coughlan	36
2025	18	12	3	3	59	29	+30	39	3rd	Did not qualify									W	R3	(Republic of Ireland) Garbhan Coughlan	19
2026	18	17	1	0	91	7	+84	52	1st	Qualifed									R1	2nd	TBD	

Season	League	Div	P	W	D	L	GF	GA	GD	Pts	League Position	English Cup	Chatham Cup	Top scorer	
Season	League	Div	P	W	D	L	GF	GA	GD	Pts	League Position	English Cup	Chatham Cup	Name	Goals
2027	National League	1	To be determined								TBD				

== Season by season record (Women) ==
2023– (Women's South Island League)

Season	Women's South Island League									Reta Fitzpatrick Cup	Kate Sheppard Cup	Top scorer	
Season	P	W	D	L	F	A	GD	Pts	Pos	Reta Fitzpatrick Cup	Kate Sheppard Cup	Name	Goals
2023	10	9	1	0	36	9	+27	28	1st	W	R2	(New Zealand) Aimee Phillips	6
2024	10	8	1	1	49	6	+43	25	1st	W	QF	(New Zealand) Anna McPhie	9
2025	16	12	0	4	63	16	+47	36	3rd	W	SF	(New Zealand) Katie Harris	10
2026	14	13	1	0	57	4	+53	40	1st	W	2nd	(New Zealand) Margarida Dias	19

Season	League	Div	P	W	D	L	GF	GA	GD	Pts	League Position	Reta Fitzpatrick Cup	Kate Sheppard Cup	Top scorer	
Season	League	Div	P	W	D	L	GF	GA	GD	Pts	League Position	Reta Fitzpatrick Cup	Kate Sheppard Cup	Name	Goals
2027	National League	1	To be determined								TBD				

== Titles ==
As Cashmere Technical

- Chatham Cup: 2013, 2014, 2021
- Southern League: 2021, 2024, 2026
- Southern Football League: 2018
- South Island Football Championship: 2013, 2014, 2015, 2020
- Mainland Premier League: 2013, 2014, 2015, 2016, 2018, 2019, 2020, 2021
- English Cup: 2015, 2017, 2018, 2019, 2020, 2021, 2022
- McFarlane Cup (Men's): 2012, 2013, 2014, 2016, 2017, 2018, 2021, 2022, 2026
- McFarlane Cup (Women's): 2016, 2022, 2024, 2025, 2026
- Hurley Shield: 2016, 2019, 2020, 2022
- Hawkey Shield: 2025, 2026
- Women's South Island League: 2023, 2024, 2026
- Reta Fitzpatrick Cup: 2016, 2019, 2023, 2024, 2025, 2026
- Mainland Football Men's Team of the Year: 2016, 2018, 2019, 2020
- Mainland Football Women's Team of the Year: 2016, 2023, 2024, 2025

Without Cashmere Technical

- Chatham Cup: 1948
- Mainland Premier League: 2009, 2010
- English Cup: 1928, 1947, 1952, 1953, 1956, 1966, 1969, 1971, 1974, 1993, 1996, 1999, 2000, 2007
- Mainland Football Men's Team of the Year: 2009
- Hurley Shield: 2009
- McFarlane Cup (Men's): 2009

Chatham Cup
Preceded by Waterside	Winner*; 1948 Chatham Cup	Succeeded by Petone
Preceded by Central United	Winner; 2013 Chatham Cup	Succeeded by Cashmere Technical
Preceded by Cashmere Technical	Winner; 2014 Chatham Cup	Succeeded by Eastern Suburbs
Preceded by Napier City Rovers	Winner; 2021 Chatham Cup	Succeeded by Auckland City
