= 2025 Kate Sheppard Cup =

Tournament details
- Country: New Zealand
- Dates: 25 April 2025 – September 2025
- Teams: 52

Final positions
- Champions: Auckland United
- Runners-up: Wellington Phoenix Reserves

Awards
- Maia Jackman Trophy: Chloe Knott (Auckland United)

The 2025 Kate Sheppard Cup is New Zealand's women's 31st annual knockout football competition. It is sponsored by Delivereasy and known as the Delivereasy Kate Sheppard Cup for sponsorship reasons.

The 2025 competition has four rounds before quarter-finals, semi-finals, and a final. Competition will run in three regions (northern, central/capital, southern) until the quarter-finals, from which stage the draw will be open. In all, 53 teams entered the competition this year.

== Results ==
=== Preliminary round ===
All matches were played over the Anzac weekend of 25–27 April 2025.

Northern Region

25 April 2025	Hamilton Wanderers	2–3	Te Awamutu	Chartwell
14:30		Report		Stadium: Porritt Stadium

26 April 2025	Whakatāne Town	w/o	Ngunguru	Whakatāne
14:00		Report		Stadium: Rex Morpeth Park

Central Region

25 April 2025	Wairarapa United	2–3	Seatoun	Masterton
14:00		Report		Stadium: Solway Showgrounds
