= Logan Park, Dunedin =

Sporting venue in Dunedin, New Zealand

Coordinates: 45.864°S 170.525°E

Logan Park
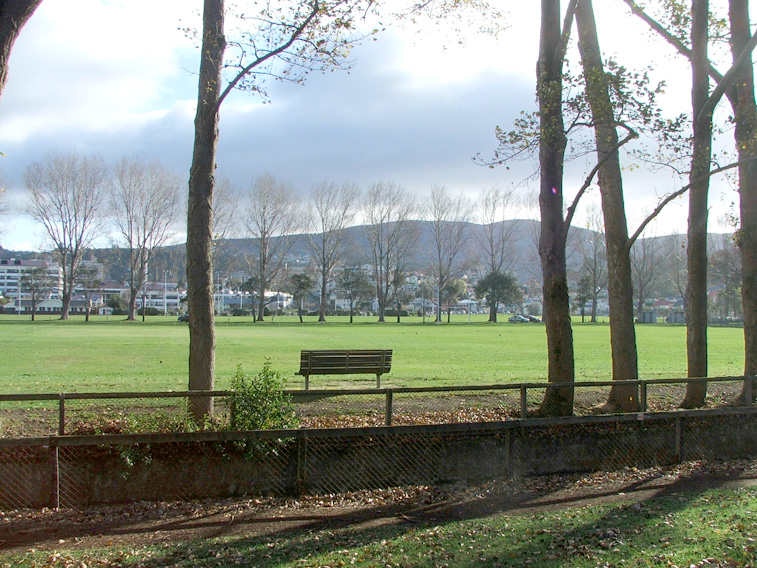
- Logan Park, looking east, with the Otago Polytechnic visible in the distance to the left
- Interactive map of Logan Park
- Location: Dunedin, New Zealand
- Owner: Dunedin City Council
- Type: Stadium Complex
- Event: Sporting Events

Construction
- Groundbreaking: 1913
- Opened: 1920
- Renovated: 1979
- Expanded: 2004, 2012

Tenants
- Otago cricket team New Zealand national cricket team

Logan Park is a sporting venue in the city of Dunedin, New Zealand. It lies on land reclaimed from the former Lake Logan.

== Features ==
Looking south across Logan Park towards Otago Harbour from the Dunedin Northern Cemetery

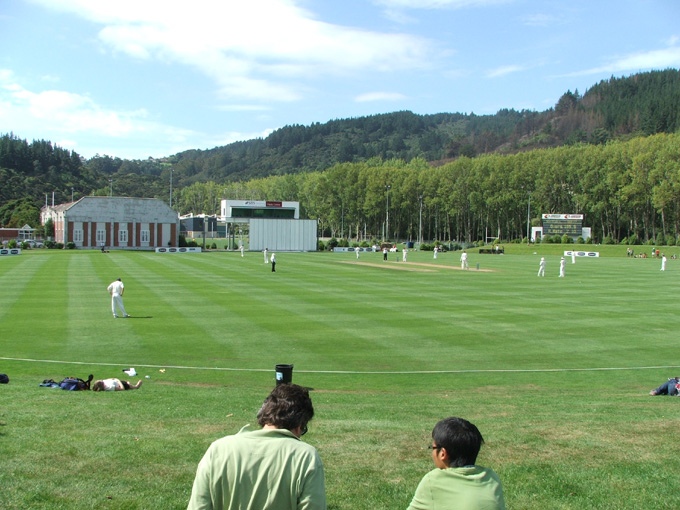
The eastern end of Logan Park is now partly occupied by the University Oval, an international Test cricket venue

The park contains both football and rugby grass and artificial pitches, known as both Dunedin Artificial Turf and Logan Park Turf, two artificial hockey turfs, bowling green, and tennis courts, and part of the park is occupied by two stadia, the University Oval stadium, home of the University of Otago Rugby Football Club and Otago Cricket, and the Caledonian Ground, which is an athletics venue and also the Dunedin's main soccer venue. A multi-purpose stadium, the Forsyth Barr Stadium at University Plaza, is located close to the southern end of the park.

The park is located at the northeastern extremity of the Water of Leith's plain. The northern and eastern sides of the park are bounded by forested hills, part of the foot of Signal Hill. A small tributary of the Leith, the Opoho Creek, flows along Logan Park's eastern perimeter, between the park and Logan Point quarry and Logan Park High School. The Otago Polytechnic campus lies alongside to the western boundary of the park, and the southern edge is bordered by the University of Otago's College of Education and the Forsyth Barr Stadium.

== History ==
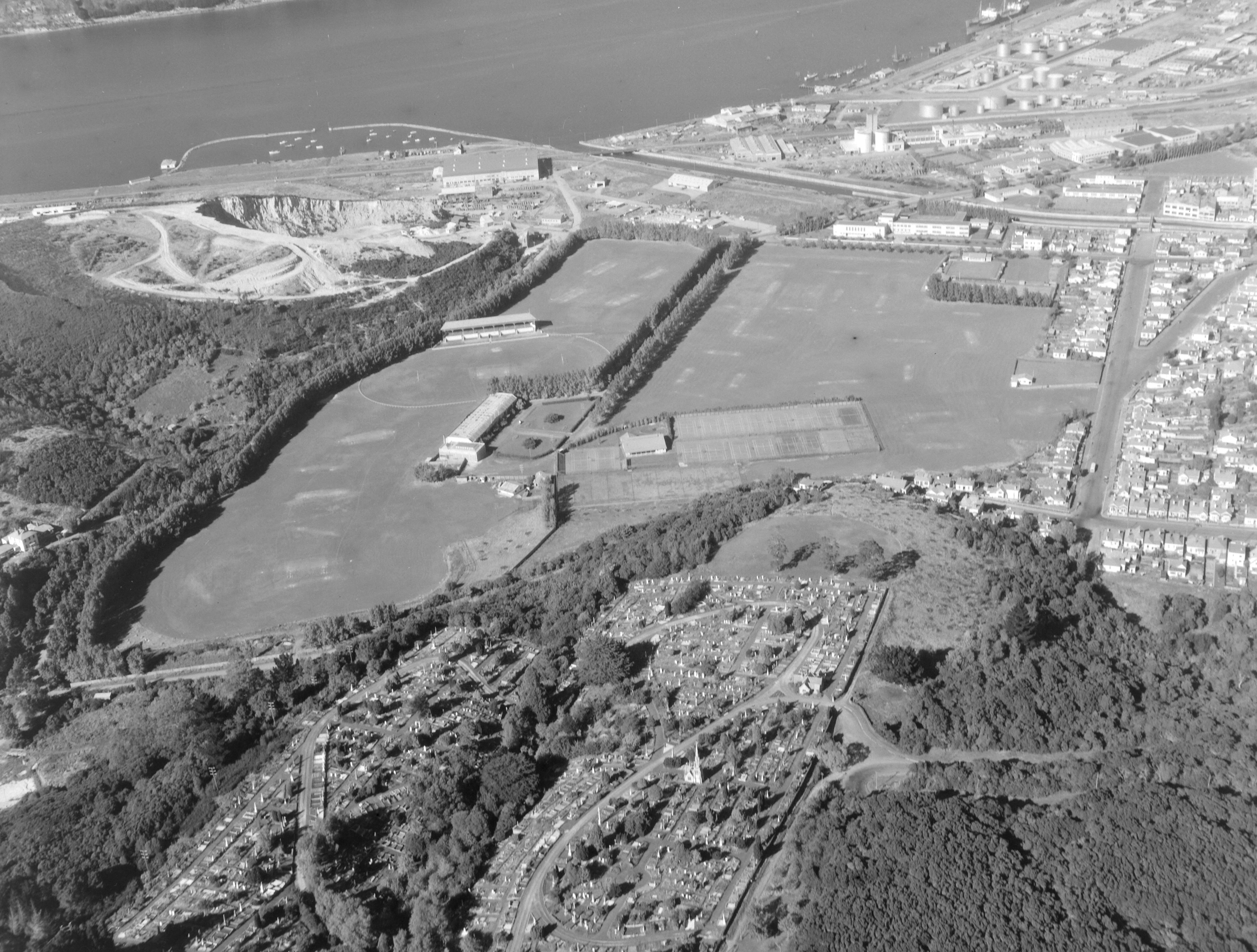
An aerial view in 1955, looking south. The Caledonian Ground had not been built, but the University Oval, former Art Gallery (centre left) and former Aquarium (centre) are clearly visible. Logan Point Quarry and the Otago Harbour are visible in the background.

Lake Logan was reclaimed in the early 20th century. Originally an inlet of the Otago Harbour called Pelichet Bay, it frequently silted up, especially after a causeway was built to allow for the South Island Main Trunk Railway between Dunedin and Port Chalmers.

Reclamation began in 1913 and continued after World War I, at which time the area was linked with the central city by a tree-lined boulevard, Anzac Avenue, leading straight to Anzac Square and the Dunedin Railway Station. The reclaimed land was turned into a park and was used as the site of the 1925 New Zealand and South Seas Exhibition. For many years the Dunedin Public Art Gallery stood in one of the buildings constructed for that exhibition. This building and the Otago Lawn Tennis Association building (formerly the aquarium) are all that remains of the exhibition buildings. Shortly after the exhibition the reclaimed land was converted into playing fields and now goes by the name of Logan Park.

The park's location close to the city's two tertiary institutions (Otago Polytechnic and the University of Otago — especially its Dunedin College of Education) and one of the city's larger high schools makes it an important and heavily used venue. The building of the Forsyth Barr Stadium at University Plaza led to traffic being diverted from Anzac Avenue (by that time part of SH 88. The main vehicular access to Logan Park is from the streets surrounding the Polytechnic and College of Education, and via a feeder road from the realigned SH 88, which skirts the harbour side of the Forsyth Barr Stadium on its path from Dunedin to Port Chalmers.

The new artificial field known as 'Logan Park Turf', was officially opened by Columbia international Juan Pablo Ángel in November 2019.

== See also ==
- Caledonian Ground
- University Oval
