= Nomads United AFC =

Nomads United
- Full name: Nomads United Association Football Club
- Nicknames: The Nomads; The Blues
- Founded: 17 January 1910; 116 years ago
- Ground: Tulett Park, Christchurch
- Chairman: Steve Daly
- Head coach: Vacant
- League: Southern League
- 2026: Southern League, 3rd of 10
- Website: https://www.nomadsafc.org
Home colours	Away colours

Nomads United is an association football club based in Casebrook, Christchurch, New Zealand. The club competes in the Southern League, the second tier of New Zealand football. Founded in 1910, the club play their home games at Tulett Park. It won its first major honour, The English Cup in 1914 and have since won it 10 more times.

== History ==
Nomads were a prominent team in early New Zealand football, reaching the later rounds of the Chatham Cup on several occasions and reaching the final in 1931. Though no longer the force they were in the early years of organised football in the country, the team again reached the final in 1963, although their best result in recent years has been to reach the quarter-finals in 2007.

Nomads United was founded in 1910 as Nomads FC in eastern Christchurch with an original intention of operating from temporary headquarters in one suburb after another, to foster local interest in the sport. At the time, football was in its infancy in New Zealand, with Nomads being only the fourth club founded in the South Island. The club colours of red, white, and blue date from these early days and were taken in honour of the then colours of prominent English team Chelsea.

Nomads had several home grounds during their early years, including English Park, Richmond Park, and - after amalgamation with Shirley FC in the 1960s - Malvern Park and McFarlane Park in Shirley. For some time after this merger the team were known as Shirley/Nomads. The club moved from Shirley to Casebrook in 1969, settling permanently at Tulett Park, and in 1972 the club changed its name to Nomads United AFC. In 1975 a women's team was added to the roster of teams at Nomads United. Despite financial problems during the early 1980s, Nomads United have survived and remain the second-oldest team in the Christchurch area. In 2021 Nomads United were promoted to the Southern League where they remain currently.

== Players ==
Note: Flags indicate national team as defined under FIFA eligibility rules; some limited exceptions apply. Players may hold more than one non-FIFA nationality.

No.	Pos.	Nation	Player
1	GK	NZL	Regan Frame
2	DF	NZL	Thomas Stewart
3	DF	NZL	Joshua Collett
4	MF	NZL	Luca Macleod-Watts
5	DF	NZL	Daniel Metherell
6	MF	NZL	William Holland
7	MF	NZL	Angus Mcintyre
8	MF	NZL	Jacob Anderson
10	MF	NZL	Caleb Cottom
11	MF	NZL	Harry Bushell

No.	Pos.	Nation	Player
12	FW	CUB	Samuel Robinson
13	FW	NZL	Cooper Goldsmith
14	FW	NZL	Memphis Vaszilyko
15	MF	NZL	Will McKee
16	MF	NZL	Joshua Litt
17	MF	NZL	Cody Johnson
18	FW	NZL	Luca Greasley
19	MF	NZL	Caleb Johnson
20	MF	NZL	Jack Lanigan
21	DF	NZL	Guy Reeves

== Season by season record ==
2022– (National League)

Season	Southern League									National League									English Cup	Chatham Cup	Top scorer	
Season	P	W	D	L	F	A	GD	Pts	Pos	P	W	D	L	F	A	GD	Pts	Pos	English Cup	Chatham Cup	Name	Goals
2022	18	4	3	11	28	57	-29	15	7th	Did not qualify									SF	R1	(New Zealand) Declan Hickford	8
2023	18	7	2	9	32	35	-3	23	7th	Did not qualify									R1	R1	(New Zealand) Declan Hickford	6
2024	18	7	3	8	27	31	-4	24	6th	Did not qualify									QF	R3	(New Zealand) Flynn Holdem	8
2025	18	8	4	6	44	35	+9	28	5th	Did not qualify									R1	R2	(New Zealand) Flynn Holdem	12
2026	18	11	3	4	42	24	+18	36	3rd	Did not qualify									2nd	R3	(New Zealand) Flynn Holdem	8

== Honours ==
Nomads A.F.C. Honours
Type	Competition	Titles	Seasons
Domestic	Canterbury Championship	1	2016
Domestic	English Cup	11	1914, 1916, 1919, 1920, 1922, 1924, 1960, 1962, 1963, 2006, 2008
Domestic	Kate Sheppard Cup	1	1994

Kate Sheppard Cup
Preceded by Inaugural	Winner; 1994 Women's Knockout Cup	Succeeded by Waikato Unicol
