= 2025 Mainland Football Leagues =

Football championship leagues

Mainland Football Leagues
- Season: 2025
- Dates: 28 March - 4 October
- Champions Men's Leagues Southern League (1) Canterbury Men's Premiership (2) Canterbury Men's Championship (3) Nelson Bays Men's Premiership (4): Team Coastal Spirit (1); Christchurch United U20 Reserves (2); Selwyn United Turkeys (3); FC Nelson (4)
- Women's Leagues South Island League (1) Canterbury Women's Premiership (2) Canterbury Women's Championship (3) Nelson Bays Women's Premiership (4): Dunedin City Royals (1); Selwyn United (2); University of Canterbury 3rd Maroon (3); Richmond Athletic (4)
- Cup Competitions English Cup (1) Reta Fitzpatrick Cup (2) Whero Cup (3) Mawhero Cup (4): Cashmere Technical (1); Cashmere Technical (2); Ferrymead Bays U20 Reserves (3); University of Canterbury 3rd Maroon (4)
- Shields Hurley Shield (Men) (1) Hawkey Shield (Women) (2) MacFarlane Cup (Men) (3) MacFarlane Cup (Women) (4): Coastal Spirit (1); Cashmere Technical (2); Christchurch United (3); Cashmere Technical (4)
- Number beside teams means what league the won, not how many times they have won it.

The 2025 Mainland Football Leagues was the 26th season of football in the Mainland Football federation. There were four main men's leagues and four main women's leagues. The main men's leagues were Southern League, Canterbury Premiership League, Nelson Bays Premiership League, and Canterbury Championship League, respectively tier 2, 3, 3 and 4 among New Zealand men's league system. The main women's leagues were South Island League, Canterbury Women's Premiership League, Nelson Bays Women's Premiership League, and Canterbury Women's Championship League, respectively tier 2, 3, 3 and 4 among New Zealand women's league system.

Along with the main football leagues, there were two main regional knockout cups and charity cups. The main knockout cups were English Cup for all men's teams and Reta Fitzpatrick Cup for all women's teams, with generally only first teams participate. The main Canterbury men's charity cup is the Whero Cup for Canterbury Men's Championship League and Men's Division 1 as well as the reserve teams from Canterbury Men's Premiership League. The Canterbury women's charity cup is the Māwhero Cup for all Canterbury Championship League, Division 1 and Sunday League teams.

In the men's Southern League, all seven Canterbury teams were eligible to participate in the Hurley Shield, a challenge shield that has been running since 2007. In the women's South Island League, all five Canterbury teams were eligible to participate in the Hawkey Shield, that has been running since 2014.

All four of the Canterbury Premiership and Championship leagues were sponsored by New World, while both the Nelson Bays Men's and Women's Premiership leagues were sponsored by Nelson Pines. Both Canterbury challenge shields were sponsored by R&B Build.

== Men's competitions ==
=== Southern League ===
The Southern League sits above the Canterbury Premiership and Nelson Bays Premiership from the Mainland Region and the Southern Premiership League of the Southern Region. The league is run by New Zealand Football as part of the New Zealand National League, and is overseen by Mainland Football and Southern Football alongside New Zealand Football.

The 2025 Southern League is the fourth season of a full 10 team league, and the fifth season overall. Ten teams will compete in the league – nine teams from the previous season plus a promoted team. The promoted team from the previous season is Wanaka, who were the 2024 Southern Premiership League runners-up.

Wanaka won the Southern League Playoff series 9–4 on aggregate over Waimakariri United. 2025 is Wanaka's first season in the Southern League. They replaced FC Twenty 11, who finished last in the previous season. FC Twenty 11 spent two seasons in the league, finishing tenth in both seasons.

==== Southern League table ====
Pos	Team	Pld	W	D	L	GF	GA	GD	Pts	Qualification
1	Coastal Spirit (C)	18	14	0	4	56	21	+35	42	Winner of Southern League and qualification to National League Championship
2	Christchurch United	18	12	4	2	66	13	+53	40	Qualification to National League Championship
3	Cashmere Technical	18	12	3	3	59	29	+30	39	
4	Nelson Suburbs	18	9	3	6	42	27	+15	30	
5	Nomads United	18	8	4	6	44	35	+9	28	
6	Ferrymead Bays	18	8	4	6	33	32	+1	28	
7	Dunedin City Royals	18	7	5	6	39	31	+8	26	
8	Wānaka	18	5	0	13	23	58	−35	15	
9	University of Canterbury (R)	18	1	2	15	20	78	−58	5	Relegated to Canterbury Premiership (Note: University of Canterbury were relegated after withdrawing from the 2026 Southern League.)
10	Selwyn United	18	0	3	15	20	78	−58	3	

Source: Mainland Football
Rules for classification: 1) Points; 2) Goal difference; 3) Goals scored; 4) Goals against; 5) Head to head; 6) Disciplinary record; 7) Coin toss
(C) Champions; (R) Relegated

==== Southern League play-off series ====
The final of the Southern League play-off series will be a two-legged match that take place between the Mainland Football nominated club and Southern Football nominated club. Mainland Football will also have a two-legged play-off match between Nelson Bays Premiership League nominated club and Canterbury Premiership League nominated club. FC Nelson came first in the 2025 Nelson Bays Men's Premiership League. Halswell United came second in the 2025 Canterbury Men's Premiership League, with champions Christchurch United U20 Reserves ineligible to participate. The winner of this play-off will face the Southern Football nominated club, Northern. Northern came first in the 2025 Southern Premiership League. None of the clubs in the play-off series have previously participated in the Southern League with FC Nelson the only to have reached the Mainland Football Playoff Series play-off stage twice, losing to University of Canterbury in the 2023 play-off series and Waimakariri United in the 2024 play-off series.

Overview

Team 1	Agg.	Team 2	1st leg	2nd leg
Halswell United (C)	5–4	FC Nelson (N)	3–1	2–3
Halswell United (C)	1–7	Northern (S)	1–4	0–3

Matches – Mainland Football Playoff Series

13 September Leg 1	Halswell United	3–1	FC Nelson	Halswell, Christchurch
12:00	Ede 9'; Young 61'; Sheikh (yellow card) 80'; Rowe (yellow card) 90+1'; Hughes 90+4'	Report	Guttmann 67' (o.g.)	Stadium: Halswell Domain; Referee: Michael Killick

20 September Leg 2	FC Nelson	3–2	Halswell United	The Wood, Nelson
12:00	Lian 36'; Pan 65', 80'; Johnston (yellow card) 66'	Report	Clarke 14'; Ede 31'; Guttmann (yellow card) 50'; Coughlan (yellow card) 68'	Stadium: Guppy Park; Referee: Andrey Valenga Guimaraes

Matches – Southern League Playoff Series

27 September Leg 1	Halswell United	1–4	Northern	Halswell, Christchurch
12:00	Coughlan (yellow card) 20'; Ede (yellow card) 21'; O’Connell 61'; Jordan (yellow card) 80'; Rowe (yellow card) 90'	Report	Cosgrove 3', 48'; Peters 8' (o.g.); Hibbert 36'; Willams (yellow card) 47'; Fraser (yellow card) 73'	Stadium: Halswell Domain; Referee: Ralph Clink

4 October Leg 2	Northern	3–0	Halswell United	Dunedin North, Dunedin
12:00	Hibbert 23', 55'; Rowe 59' (o.g.); Jordan (yellow card) 65'; Dale (yellow card) 90+3'	Report	Peters (yellow card) 58'	Stadium: Football Turf; Referee: Jan-Hendrik Kuepper

==== Hurley Shield ====
Hurley Shield
- Season: 2025
- Dates: 24 April - 31 August
- Champions: Coastal Spirit
- Matches: 7
- Goals: 24 (3.43 per match)
- Biggest home win: Christchurch United; 10–0; University of Canterbury
- Biggest away win: Christchurch United; 0–2; Coastal Spirit

The Hurley Shield is a Challenge Shield, where only teams from Christchurch challenge for the shield. It is only up for challenge when the current holders plays a league home game, cups competitions are not challenge games. The challenging team need to win against the current holders in order for the shield to change hands; if the match is a draw, the current holders retain the shield.

The Hurley Shield holders are Coastal Spirit, who defeated Christchurch United this season 0–2 in round 17 to claim the shield. They have defended the shield once since retaining it, and it was against University of Canterbury.

Christchurch United before they lost the shield, they have had five successful defense this season against; University of Canterbury, Cashmere Technical, Nomads United, Ferrymead Bays and Selwyn United.

===== Hurley Shield Matches =====
Match 1

24 April Round 5	Christchurch United	10–0	University of Canterbury	Spreydon
19:00	Graham 8'; Cambell 13' (o.g.); Rogerson 15'; Stevens 21'; Wilkinson 24', 53'; Osawa (yellow card) 45+2'; Meyn 70', 87'; Borella 76'; Tollervey (yellow card) 81' (goal) 85'	Report		Stadium: United Sports Centre; Referee: Michael Love

Match 2

16 May Round 7	Christchurch United	2–0	Cashmere Technical	Spreydon
19:00	Meyn 15'; Beale (yellow card) 29'; Godden 49' (yellow card) 57'; Graham (yellow card) 64'; Stevens (yellow card) 78'; Wilkinson (yellow card) 80'	Report	Angus (yellow card) 58'; Schwarz (yellow card) 86'; Matthysen (yellow card) 90+3'	Stadium: United Sports Centre; Referee: Ben O'Connell

Match 3

20 June Round 10	Christchurch United	1–1	Nomads United	Spreydon
19:00	Tollervey (yellow card) 37'; Rogerson (yellow card) 86'; Stroud (yellow card) 88' (yellow-red card) 88'; Graham (yellow card) 90' (goal) 90+2'	Report	Holland (yellow card) 42'; Holden 69'	Stadium: United Sports Centre; Referee: Ralph Clink

Match 4

11 July Round 12	Christchurch United	1–0	Ferrymead Bays	Spreydon
19:00	Stroud 69'; Meyn (yellow card) 90'	Report	Pritchard (yellow card) 90+3'	Stadium: United Sports Centre; Referee: Ralph Clink

Match 5

18 July Round 13	Christchurch United	4–1	Selwyn United	Spreydon
19:00	Tollervey 32', 63'; Osawa 34'; Pradhan (yellow card) 79'; Rogerson 85'	Report	Carrodus (yellow card) 89'; Barrett 90+1'	Stadium: United Sports Centre; Referee: Caleb Downes

Match 6

22 August Round 17	Christchurch United	0–2	Coastal Spirit	Spreydon
19:00	Grover (yellow card) 35'; Beale (yellow card) 47'; Stroud (yellow card) 72' (red card) 80'; Tollervey (yellow card) 90+6'; Godden (yellow card) 90+7'	Report	Hoole (yellow card) 63'; Cotter (yellow card) 67' (goal) 82'; Ichimura 73'; Braman (yellow card) 81'	Stadium: United Sports Centre; Referee: Ralph Clink

Match 7

31 August Round 18	Coastal Spirit	2–0	University of Canterbury	Linwood
11:30	Cotter 45+3'; Chrétien 71'	Report	Campbell (yellow card) 79'; Bayly (yellow card) 82'	Stadium: Tāne Norton Park; Referee: Michael Killick

=== Canterbury Men's Premiership League ===
Canterbury Men's Premiership League
- Season: 2025
- Dates: 28 March - 6 September
- Champions: Christchurch United U20 Reserves
- Relegated: FC Twenty 11; University of Canterbury U20 Reserves
- Matches: 110
- Goals: 490 (4.45 per match)
- Top goalscorer: Danny Loney (15 goals)
- Biggest home win: Nomads United U20 10–1 University Of Canterbury U20 (5 July); Christchurch United U20 9–0 FC Twenty 11 (5 April); Western 9–0 FC Twenty 11 (18 April)
- Biggest away win: Western 1–8 Christchurch United U20 (17 May)

The 2025 Canterbury Men's Premiership League was the 4th season of premiership football, since the restructure of the leagues. The League started on 28 March and finished on 6 September, with the competition being a double round robin. Each team can field a maximum of five foreign players as well as one additional foreign player who has Oceania Football Confederation nationality. Temporary Dismissals will be in use for when a player commits a cautionable offence that is relevant to dissent and the length of the dismissal is 10 minutes starting from when play restarts.

At the end of season, the highest ranked first team will be nominated to play in a Mainland Football Federation Playoff, two-leg home and away series, against the highest ranked nominated first team from Nelson Bays Men's Premiership. This is to get the team that will compete against the highest ranked nominated first team from Southern Premiership League in the Southern League Playoff, two-leg home and away series. The winner of Southern League Playoff Series will be promoted to Southern League, assuming they will have the correct club licensing before the season starts.

==== Men's Premiership teams and personnel ====
Eleven teams are competing in the league – nine teams from the previous season, one team promoted from the Canterbury Men's Championship League and one team relegated from the Southern League. The promoted team is University of Canterbury U20 Reserves, this is their first season in the league. The relegated team is FC Twenty 11, this is their second season in the league after winning the league in 2022.

Team	Home ground	Location	Manager	Captain	2024 season
Burwood AFC	Clare Park	Burwood	Darren Clements	Elijah Austen	2nd
Cashmere Technical U20 Reserves	Garrick Memorial Park	Woolston	Jay Blake	Ewan Hyndman	3rd
Christchurch United U20 Reserves	United Sports Centre	Spreydon	(United States) Paul Holocher	Harry Huxford	7th
FC Twenty 11	Avonhead Park	Avonhead	(New Zealand) Simon Darby (joint) (New Zealand) Marius Moeser (joint)	Mustafa Rafyee	10th in Southern League (relegated)
Ferrymead Bays U20 Reserves	Ferrymead Park	Ferrymead	(New Zealand) Robert Barraclough	Oliver McCosh	8th
Halswell United	Halswell Domain	Halswell	(New Zealand) Ollie Hawkins	Conor Clarke	4th
Nomads United Reserves	Tulett Park	Casebrook	(New Zealand) Atticus Jones	Hamish Gillett	5th
Selwyn United U20 Reserves	Foster Park	Rolleston	John Morgan	Josiah Clark	6th
University of Canterbury U20 Reserves	English Park	St Albans	(New Zealand) Joshua Dray	Stuart Campbell	1st in Championship (promoted)
Waimakariri United	Kendal Park	Kaiapoi	(South Korea) Jae Youn Lee	Bailey McCleary	1st
Western AFC	Walter Park	Mairehau	James Small	Chris Boomer	9th

===== Men's Premiership Managerial changes =====
Team	Outgoing manager	Manner of departure	Date of vacancy	Position in the table	Incoming manager	Date of appointment
Cashmere Technical U20 Reserves	(England) Adam Keizer	Mutual Consent	31 August 2024	Pre-season	Jay Blake	29 March 2025
FC Twenty 11	(Uruguay) Ricardo Felitti	Signed by University of Canterbury	1 September 2024	Pre-season	(New Zealand) Simon Darby (joint) (New Zealand) Marius Moeser (joint)	6 December 2024
Waimakariri United	(New Zealand) Harry Trethowan	Stepped down	19 February 2025	Pre-season	(South Korea) Jae Youn Lee	27 February 2025
University of Canterbury U20 Reserves	(New Zealand) Ben Ellis	Stepped Down	Before 29 March 2025	Pre-season	(New Zealand) Joshua Dray	29 March 2025

==== Men's Premiership table ====
Pos	Team	Pld	W	D	L	GF	GA	GD	Pts	Qualification
1	Christchurch United U20 Reserves (Note: Unable to be promoted to Southern League due to already having a side in the Southern League; therefore are ineligible to be considered for the 'Playoff Series'. Team is also able to be automatically relegated if the club's Southern League team is relegated, due to a club only allowed to have one team in the league.)	20	13	3	4	68	26	+42	42	Winners of Canterbury Premiership
2	Halswell United	20	12	5	3	52	29	+23	41	Possible qualification to Southern League play-offs (Note: If highest ranked first team; doesn't nominate themselves to be considered for promotion or decline participation for the playoffs, the second highest ranked first team is nominated)
3	Ferrymead Bays U20 Reserves	20	12	4	4	52	38	+14	40	
4	Cashmere Technical U20 Reserves	20	11	4	5	48	27	+21	37	
5	Waimakariri United	20	10	3	7	55	47	+8	33	
6	Nomads United U20 Reserves	20	7	5	8	56	40	+16	26	
7	Western	20	7	4	9	44	53	−9	25	
8	Selwyn United U20 Reserves	20	7	1	12	40	49	−9	22	
9	Burwood	20	7	1	12	30	48	−18	22	
10	University of Canterbury U20 Reserves (R)	20	4	3	13	25	56	−31	15	Relegation to Canterbury Men's Championship League
11	FC Twenty 11 (R)	20	2	3	15	23	80	−57	9	Relegation to Canterbury Men's Championship League

Source: Mainland Football
Rules for classification: 1) Points; 2) Goal difference; 3) Goals scored; 4) Goals against; 5) Head to head; 6) Disciplinary record; 7) Coin toss
(R) Relegated

==== Men's Premiership results table ====
Home \ Away	BUR	CTR	CUR	FCT	FBR	HWU	NUR	SUR	UCR	WAI	WES
Burwood		1–0	1–4	5–2	2–3	1–2	1–5	3–0	1–6	0–2	2–2
Cashmere Technical U20 Reserves	4–1		1–0	5–0	3–0	4–4	2–1	1–2	4–0	4–1	3–0
Christchurch United U20 Reserves	5–0	1–1		9–0	2–2	3–2	3–3	3–2	4–0	2–1	5–1
FC Twenty 11	1–3	3–4	0–4		1–4	0–6	1–3	2–2	6–1	1–1	0–1
Ferrymead Bays U20 Reserves	1–4	2–1	3–2	3–0		2–2	3–2	4–1	3–1	4–1	6–3
Halswell United	1–0	3–1	3–0	3–2	2–1		6–2	3–1	0–0	3–4	2–2
Nomads United U20 Reserves	0–2	2–2	1–2	2–2	3–4	1–1		0–1	10–1	6–2	4–3
Selwyn United U20 Reserves	0–1	2–4	2–1	8–0	1–3	3–4	1–4		1–4	5–3	4–2
University of Canterbury U20 Reserves	3–0	0–0	0–6	1–2	1–1	1–2	0–4	0–2		0–1	3–1
Waimakariri United	5–2	4–2	2–4	6–0	4–1	0–3	2–2	4–1	4–2		5–2
Western	2–1	0–2	1–8	9–0	2–2	1–0	2–1	3–1	4–1	3–3	

Source: Mainland Football
Legend: Blue = home team win; Yellow = draw; Red = away team win.

==== Men's Premiership scoring ====
===== Men's Premiership top scorers =====
Rank	Player	Club	Goals
1	Danny Loney	Waimakariri United	15
2	Luka Fields	Cashmere Technical U20 Reserves	13
2	Tinashe Masiuakurima	Christchurch United U20 Reserves	13
4	Jakaya Anink	Cashmere Technical U20 Reserves	12
4	Conor Clarke	Halswell United	12
4	Benjamin Worrall	Nomads United U20 Reserves	12
7	Connor Brandon	Western	11
7	Daniel Ede	Halswell United	11
9	Luke Barrett	Selwyn United U20 Reserves	9
9	Zack Killick	Nomads United U20 Reserves	9

===== Men's Premiership hat-tricks =====
Round	Player	For	Against	Home/Away	Result	Date
2	Conor Clarke	Halswell United	Cashmere Technical U20 Reserves	Away	4–4	5 April 2025
3	Conor Clarke	Halswell United	Selwyn United U20 Reserves	Home	3–1	12 April 2025
4	Daniel Steffert	Western	FC Twenty 11	Home	9–0	18 April 2025
6	Jakaya Anink	Cashmere Technical U20 Reserves	FC Twenty 11	Home	5–0	17 May 2025
13	Danny Loney	Waimakariri United	Western	Home	5–2	4 July 2025
13	Benjamin Worrall	Nomads United U20 Reserves	University of Canterbury U20 Reserves	Home	10–1	5 July 2025
14	Daniel Ede	Halswell United	Selwyn United U20 Reserves	Away	3–4	12 July 2025
17	George Suter	Waimakariri United	Burwood	Home	5–2	2 August 2025
18	Parker Bradford	Western	University of Canterbury U20 Reserves	Home	4–1	9 August 2025
20	Benjamin Worrall	Nomads United U20 Reserves	Selwyn United U20 Reserves	Away	1–4	23 August 2025
21	Danny Loney	Waimakariri United	University of Canterbury U20 Reserves	Home	4–2	30 August 2025
22	Luke Barrett	Selwyn United U20 Reserves	FC Twenty 11	Home	8–0	6 September 2025

===== Men's Premiership own goals =====
Round	Player	Club	H/A	Time	Goal	Result	Opponent	Date
3	Matheus Freure de Andrade	Nomads United U20 Reserves	Home	20'	1–1	4–3	Western	12 April 2025
4	Callum Moores	Ferrymead Bays U20 Reserves	Away	16'	1–0	1–1	University of Canterbury U20 Reserves	18 April 2025
6	Rico Pradhan	Christchurch United U20 Reserves	Away	12'	1–1	3–2	Ferrymead Bays U20 Reserves	14 May 2025
11	Adam Harrison	Waimakariri United	Away	21'	1–1	2–1	Christchurch United U20 Reserves	20 June 2025
22	Luke Pritchard	Ferrymead Bays U20 Reserves	Away	16'	1–0	3–4	Nomads United U20 Reserves	6 September 2025
22	Liam van den Bosch	Ferrymead Bays U20 Reserves	Away	87'	3–3	3–4	Nomads United U20 Reserves	6 September 2025
22	Wiari Rusbridge	Western	Away	30'	1–0	2–2	Halswell United	6 September 2025

=== Canterbury Men's Championship League ===
Canterbury Men's Championship League
- Season: 2025
- Dates: 5 April - 13 September
- Champions: Selwyn United Turkeys
- Relegated: Waimakariri United Reserves; Oxford (withdrew)
- Matches: 90
- Goals: 424 (4.71 per match)
- Biggest home win: Ferrymead Bays Keen Lads 15–1 FC Twenty 11 Reserves (17 May)
- Biggest away win: FC Twenty 11 Reserves 0–10 Ferrymead Bays Keen Lads (6 September)
- Highest scoring: Ferrymead Bays Keen Lads 15–1 FC Twenty 11 Reserves (17 May)

The 2025 Canterbury Men's Championship League was the 9th season of championship football, 3rd since the restructure of the leagues. The League started on 5 April and finished on 13 September, with league format being a double round robin.

Temporary Dismissals will be in use, when an official referee has been appointed, for when a player commits a cautionable offence that is relevant to dissent and the length of the dismissal is 10 minutes starting from when play restarts. For when an official referee hasn't been appointed, they will be known as Sin Bins. A sin bin is the same as a temporary dismissals, but another player is allowed to be subbed on to bring the team back to 11 players. After 10 minutes, the player is allowed to be used again.

The competition allows for each team to have a match day squad of 18 players, 11 starting and 7 substitutes. It also allows for each team to make unlimited substitutions from the 7 substitutes.

==== Men's Championship teams and personnel ====
Ten teams are competing in the league – eight teams from the previous season, one promoted team and one relegated team. The team promoted is from Canterbury Division 1 and is Oxford, this its their first season in the league. The team relegated is from the Premiership League is Parklands United, this is their first season in the league since the restructure.

Team	Home ground	Location	Manager	Captain	2024 season
Cashmere Technical U20 Reserves	Garrick Memorial Park	Woolston	(New Zealand) Liam Collins	Fergus West	5th
Coastal Spirit U20 Reserves	Linfield Park	Bromley	Lee Robinson	Lincoln Huddy	9th
FC Twenty 11 Reserves	Avonhead Park	Avonhead	Boyd Kedzlie	Omar Ghoudan	8th
Ferrymead Bays Keen Lads	Ferrymead Park	Ferrymead	Antony Lawson	Ben Loader	3rd
Halswell United Reserves	Halswell Domain	Halswell	Patrick Rouss	Joseph Barrett	6th
Oxford	Persons Park	Oxford	(New Zealand) Jeroen Dunnink	Sergio Cuevas	1st in Division 1 (Promoted)
Parklands United	Parklands Reserve	Parklands	Hamish Parker	Lewis Miller	10th in Premiership (Relegated)
Selwyn United Turkeys	Foster Park	Rolleston	Michael Hadfield (joint); Lee Hinton (joint)	Sam Bourke	2nd
University of Canterbury 3rd XI	Ilam Field	Ilam	Patrick Morris	Liam Sluiter	4th
Waimakariri United Reserves	Kendal Park	Kaiapoi	Matt McDowell	Zachary de Bono	7th

===== Men's Championship Managerial changes =====
Team	Outgoing manager	Manner of departure	Date of vacancy	Position in the table	Incoming manager	Date of appointment
Coastal Spirit U20 Reserves	(New Zealand) John Reynolds	Stepped down	17 August 2024	Pre-season	Lee Robinson	23 December 2024
Waimakariri United Reserves	Mark Reid	Stepped down	17 August 2024	Pre-season	Matt McDowell	Before 19 March 2025
FC Twenty 11 Reserves	(New Zealand) Joshua Dray	Signed by University of Canterbury U20 Reserves	Before 29 March 2025	Pre-season	Boyd Kedzlie	5 April 2025

==== Men's Championship table ====
Pos	Team	Pld	W	D	L	GF	GA	GD	Pts	Promotion or relegation
1	Selwyn United Turkeys (Note: Unable to be promoted to Canterbury Premiership League due to already having a side in the Canterbury Premiership League; therefore are ineligible to be promoted.) (C, D, W)	18	15	3	0	62	25	+37	48	Winners of Canterbury Championship Withdrew from 2026 season Team dissolved at start of 2026 season
2	Ferrymead Bays Keen Lads	18	14	0	4	64	15	+49	42	
3	Coastal Spirit U20 Reserves	18	11	4	3	55	26	+29	37	
4	Parklands United	18	10	0	8	53	41	+12	30	
5	University of Canterbury 3rd XI	18	9	3	6	37	30	+7	30	
6	Oxford (W)	18	7	1	10	30	36	−6	22	Withdrew from 2026 season, placed in Senior Men's Division 9
7	Cashmere Technical U20 Reserves	18	6	3	9	39	40	−1	21	
8	Halswell United Reserves	18	6	2	10	33	35	−2	20	
9	FC Twenty 11 Reserves	18	3	0	15	30	96	−66	9	
10	Waimakariri United Reserves	18	1	0	17	21	80	−59	3	

Source: Mainland Football
Rules for classification: 1) Points; 2) Goal difference; 3) Goals scored; All teams declared winners
(C) Champions; (D) Dissolved; (W) Withdrew
- Coastal Spirit U20 Reserves won 3–0 in Round 8, but fielded an ineligible player. (Note: Due to a protest that has been upheld, Coastal Spirit have been found to have played an ineligible player. The game is considered forfeit for Coastal Spirit resulting in a 3-0 win for Halswell United.) Result overturned to a 3–0 win for Halswell United Reserves.

==== Men's Championship results table ====
Home \ Away	CTR	CSR	FCR	FKL	HUR	OXF	PLU	SUT	UC3	WUR
Cashmere Technical U20 Reserves		3–5	6–0	2–4	1–1	1–2	3–2	3–3	2–2	4–0
Coastal Spirit U20 Reserves	3–1		3–0	1–2	1–1	2–1	5–0	1–1	1–1	6–2
FC Twenty 11 Reserves	5–4	1–8		0–10	0–3	0–3	4–6	0–4	1–4	5–3
Ferrymead Bays Keen Lads	2–0	3–0	15–1		4–0	2–0	2–1	2–3	1–4	8–0
Halswell United Reserves	3–1	3–0*	2–3	1–2		2–3	1–5	2–3	1–2	3–0
Oxford	0–3	2–3	3–1	1–0	0–2		0–4	1–4	1–2	7–2
Parklands United	5–2	1–5	7–2	1–3	3–2	3–1		2–3	3–1	4–0
Selwyn United Turkeys	2–0	3–3	6–2	2–1	3–2	2–1	2–1		4–2	11–0
University of Canterbury 3rd XI	0–1	1–2	6–3	2–1	3–1	1–1	1–0	1–4		4–1
Waimakariri United Reserves	1–2	0–6	3–2	0–1	1–3	2–3	4–5	1–2	1–4	

Source: Mainland Football
Legend: Blue = home team win; Yellow = draw; Red = away team win.

=== Nelson Bays Men's Premiership League ===
Nelson Bays Men's Premiership League
- Season: 2025
- Dates: 12 April - 2 August
- Champions: FC Nelson
- Relegated: Nelson Suburbs U18
- Matches: 42
- Goals: 217 (5.17 per match)
- Biggest home win: FC Nelson 13–0 Nelson Suburbs U18 (10 June)
- Biggest away win: Nelson Suburbs U18 0–7 FC Nelson (14 June)

The Leagues started on 12 April and finished on 2 August, with the competition being a double round robin.

At the end of season, the highest ranked nominated first team will be nominated to play in a Mainland Football Federation Playoff, two-leg home and away series, against the highest ranked first team from Canterbury Men's Premiership. This is to get the team that will compete against the highest ranked nominated team from Southern Premiership League in the Southern League Playoff, two-leg home and away series. The winner of Southern League Playoff Series will be promoted to Southern League, assuming they will have the correct club licensing before the season starts.

==== Nelson Men's Premiership teams and personnel ====
Seven teams are competing in the league – six teams from the previous season plus one new entry. The new entry team is Nelson Suburbs U18. They replace Golden Bay and Motueka.

Team	Location	Home ground	2024 season
FC Nelson	The Wood, Nelson	Guppy Park	3rd
FC Nelson Karenni	Nelson South, Nelson	Victory Square	4th
Nelson Suburbs Reserves	Stoke, Nelson	Saxton Fields	3th
Nelson Suburbs U18	Stoke, Nelson	Saxton Fields	New entry
Rangers	Blenheim	A & P Park	1st
Richmond Athletic	Richmond	Jubilee Park	6th
Tahuna	Tāhunanui, Nelson	Tāhunanui	7th

==== Nelson Men's Premiership table ====
Pos	Team	Pld	W	D	L	GF	GA	GD	Pts	Qualification
1	FC Nelson (C)	12	10	1	1	49	11	+38	31	Qualification to Southern League play-offs
2	Rangers	12	10	0	2	54	12	+42	30	
3	Tahuna	12	6	3	3	25	24	+1	21	
4	Nelson Suburbs Reserves (Note: Unable to be promoted to Southern League due to already having a side in the Southern League; therefore are ineligible to be considered for the 'Playoff Series'.)	12	4	2	6	25	36	−11	14	
5	FC Nelson Karenni	12	4	1	7	26	34	−8	13	
6	Richmond Athletic	12	3	2	7	22	36	−14	11	
7	Nelson Suburbs U18 (R)	12	0	1	11	16	64	−48	1	Relegation to Nelson Bays Men's Division 2

Source: Nelson Bays Football
Rules for classification: 1) Points; 2) Goal difference; 3) Goals scored; All teams declared winners
(C) Champions; (R) Relegated

==== Nelson Men's Premiership results table ====
Home \ Away	FCN	FNK	NSR	NS3	RAN	RFC	TAH
FC Nelson		3–0	2–1	13–0	4–1	1–0	5–2
FC Nelson Karenni	3–2		2–3	7–0	1–6	2–2	0–2
Nelson Suburbs Reserves	1–3	2–4		2–2	1–4	5–2	3–4
Nelson Suburbs U18	0–7	3–4	1–3		1–4	2–3	3–4
Rangers	1–2	3–0 (Note: FC Nelson Karenni defaulted, 3–0 win to Rangers)	9–0	10–0		6–1	4–1
Richmond Athletic	0–5	5–2	2–3	5–3	0–4		1–1
Tahuna	2–2	3–1	1–1	2–1	1–2	2–1	

Source: Nelson Bays Football
Legend: Blue = home team win; Yellow = draw; Red = away team win.

== Women's competitions ==
=== South Island League ===
South Island League
- Season: 2025
- Dates: 29 March - 7 September
- Champions: Dunedin City Royals
- Relegated: Halswell United
- Matches: 72
- Goals: 332 (4.61 per match)
- Top goalscorer: Britney-Lee Nicholson (22 goals)
- Biggest home win: Dunedin City Royals 8–0 Nelson Suburbs (17 May)
- Biggest away win: Halswell United 0–13 Coastal Spirit (23 August)
- Highest scoring: Halswell United 0–13 Coastal Spirit (23 August)

The 2025 Women's South Island League is the first full season, fourth season in total, of the second level of women's football in New Zealand, and the third season under the name Women's South Island League.

This year the South Island League goes straight to the league phase without the qualifying leagues. The is the culmination of the two regional federations, each of which provide teams to the Women's South Island League. The league will be a double round robin, with each team having a home and away tie against each other.

The South Island League sits above the Canterbury Women's Premiership League Mainland Football and Southern Football, despite being run by New Zealand Football as part of the future New Zealand Women's National League.

==== South Island League teams ====
Nine team are competing in the leagues - all six teams from last season and 3 promoted teams. The three promoted teams are Halswell United, Nomads-Waimakariri United (NW United for short) and University of Canterbury. This is Halswell United and NW United's first season in the league, and it is University of Canterbury's second season in the league after not qualifying for last season league.

Team	Home ground	Location	2024 season
Cashmere Technical	Garrick Memorial Park	Woolston, Christchurch	1st
Coastal Spirit	Tāne Norton Park	Linwood, Christchurch	3rd
Dunedin City Royals	Tahuna Park	Tainui, Dunedin	2nd
Halswell United	Halswell Domain	Halswell, Christchurch	3rd in Canterbury Women's Premiership League (promoted)
Nelson Suburbs	Saxton Field	Stoke, Nelson	6th
Nomads–Waimakariri United	Tulett Park	Casebrook, Christchurch	2nd in Canterbury Women's Premiership League (promoted)
Nomads–Waimakariri United	Kendal Park	Kaiapoi	2nd in Canterbury Women's Premiership League (promoted)
Otago University	Football Turf	Dunedin North, Dunedin	4th
Roslyn-Wakari	Football Turf	Dunedin North, Dunedin	5th
University of Canterbury	English Park	St Albans, Christchurch	1st in Canterbury Women's Premiership League (promoted)

==== South Island League personal ====
Team	Manager	Captain
Cashmere Technical	Shane Verma	
Coastal Spirit	(New Zealand) Kelly Almond	(New Zealand) Britney-Lee Nicholson
Dunedin City Royals	(New Zealand) Kris Ridley	Rose Morton
Halswell United	Katie Pottinger	Sophie Withell
Nelson Suburbs	Neil Harding	Jacinta Borer
Nomads–Waimakariri United	Mike de Bono	
Otago University	Hamish Philip	Samantha Woolley
Roslyn-Wakari	Arnon Tapp	Sophie Wylie
University of Canterbury	Elliot Anderson-Evans	Kelsey Barrett

==== South Island League managerial changes ====
Note: Some cases use first/last match coached

Team	Outgoing manager	Manner of departure	Date of vacancy	Position in the table	Incoming manager	Date of appointment
Halswell United	Chris Hoult	Mutual Consent	24 August 2024	Pre Season	Katie Pottinger	18 December 2024
Cashmere Technical	Shane Verma	Stepped Down	8 September 2024	Pre Season	(New Zealand) Fred Simpson	2 February 2025
Dunedin City Royals	(New Zealand) Graeme Smaill	Stepped Down	18 October 2024	Pre Season	(New Zealand) Kris Ridley	31 January 2025
Cashmere Technical	(New Zealand) Fred Simpson	Unknown			Shane Verma	Unknown

==== South Island League table ====
Pos	Team	Pld	W	D	L	GF	GA	GD	Pts	Qualification
1	Dunedin City Royals (C)	16	15	0	1	64	9	+55	45	Winner of Women's South Island League
2	Otago University	16	12	1	3	41	13	+28	37	
3	Cashmere Technical	16	12	0	4	63	16	+47	36	
4	Coastal Spirit	16	11	0	5	63	22	+41	33	
5	University of Canterbury	16	6	1	9	28	33	−5	19	
6	Roslyn-Wakari	16	4	2	10	25	55	−30	14	
7	Nelson Suburbs	16	4	1	11	17	43	−26	13	
8	Nomads–Waimakariri United	16	3	1	12	21	49	−28	10	
9	Halswell United (R)	16	1	2	13	10	92	−82	5	Relegated to Canterbury Premier League/Southern Premier League

Source: Mainland Football
Rules for classification: 1) Points; 2) Goal difference; 3) Goals scored; 4) Goals against; 5) Head to head; 6) Disciplinary record; 7) Coin toss
(C) Champions; (R) Relegated
- Cashmere Technical won 5–1 in Round 5 vs Roslyn Wakari, but fielded an ineligible player. Result overturned to a 3–0 win for Roslyn Wakari.

==== South Island League result table ====
Home \ Away	CT	CS	DC	HU	NS	NW	OU	RW	UC
Cashmere Technical		0–3	1–2	6–1	5–1	7–0	2–0	0–3 (Note: Cashmere Technical won 5–1 in Round 5 vs Roslyn Wakari, but fielded an ineligible player. Result overturned to a 3–0 win for Roslyn Wakari.)	7–2
Coastal Spirit	1–4		0–1	7–1	2–0	6–0	0–4	4–1	4–2
Dunedin City Royals	1–4	2–0		5–0	8–0	2–0	1–0	8–2	2–0
Halswell United	0–10	0–13	0–8		1–4	2–1	0–8	0–5	1–5
Nelson Suburbs	1–3	1–8	1–3	0–0		2–3	0–2	2–1	0–1
Nomads–Waimakariri United	0–2	2–7	0–5	7–0	0–3		0–3	1–2	1–3
Otago University	2–1	2–0	0–4	2–2	3–0	3–1		2–0	3–2
Roslyn-Wakari	0–9	1–4	1–10	6–3	1–2	1–1	0–5		1–1
University of Canterbury	0–2	1–4	0–2	5–0	2–0	1–4	0–2	3–0	

Source: Mainland Football
Legend: Blue = home team win; Yellow = draw; Red = away team win.

==== South Island League scoring ====
===== South Island League top scorers =====
Rank	Player	Club	Goals
1	Britney-Lee Nicholson	Coastal Spirit	22
2	Amy Hislop	Dunedin City Royals	19
3	Margarida Dias	Coastal Spirit	15
4	Liv Deane	University of Canterbury	11
5	Katie Harris	Cashmere Technical	10
5	Georgia Nixon	Otago University	10
5	Raegan Potter	Dunedin City Royals	10
8	Leila Hausia-Haugen	Otago University	8
9	Katie Brugh	Cashmere Technical	7
9	Petra Buyck	Cashmere Technical	7
9	Amelie East Giles	Roslyn Wakari	7
9	Kylie Jones	Dunedin City Royals	7
9	Hannah Mackay-Wright	Dunedin City Royals	7

===== South Island League hat-tricks =====
Round	Player	For	Against	H/A	Result	Date
3	Amy Hislop	Dunedin City Royals	Roslyn Wakari	Home	8–2	13 April 2025
4	Margarida Dias	Coastal Spirit	University of Canterbury	Home	4–2	18 April 2025
6	Amelie East Giles	Roslyn Wakari	Halswell United	Home	6–3	3 May 2025
7	Amy Hislop	Dunedin City Royals	Nelson Suburbs	Home	8–0	17 May 2025
8	Britney-Lee Nicholson	Coastal Spirit	Halswell United	Home	7–1	25 May 2025
9	Britney-Lee Nicholson	Coastal Spirit	NW United	Away	2–7	7 June 2025
12	Amy Hislop (Note: Player scored 5 goals)	Dunedin City Royals	Roslyn Wakari	Away	1–10	12 July 2025
12	Katie Harris	Cashmere Technical	Haslwell United	Away	0–10	12 July 2025
12	Katie Brugh	Cashmere Technical	Haslwell United	Away	0–10	12 July 2025
14	Katie Brugh	Cashmere Technical	Roslyn Wakari	Away	0–9	27 July 2025
16	Jemma Wilson	Cashmere Technical	Coastal Spirit	Away	1–4	10 August 2025
17	Britney-Lee Nicholson	Coastal Spirit	Halsell United	Away	0–13	23 August 2025
17	Margarida Dias	Coastal Spirit	Halsell United	Away	0–13	23 August 2025
18	Ruby Luxton	Cashmere Technical	University of Canterbury	Home	7–2	27 August 2025
18	Liv Deane (Note: Player scored 4 goals)	University of Canterbury	Halswell United	Home	5–0	30 August 2025
18	Britney-Lee Nicholson	Coastal Spirit	NW United	Home	6–0	30 August 2025
19	Britney-Lee Nicholson (Note: Player scored 6 goals)	Coastal Spirit	Nelson Suburbs	Away	1–8	7 September 2025

===== South Island League own goals =====
Round	Player	Club	H/A	Time	Goal	Result	Opponent	Date
2	Tara Ballie	Halswell United	Home	4'	0–1	0–8	Otago University	5 April 2025
3	Hollie Carlisle-Reeve	Nomads–Waimakariri United	Away	8'	1–0	3–1	Otago University	13 April 2025
5	Gillian Morgan	Nelson Suburbs	Away	72'	2–0	2–0	University of Canterbury	27 April 2025
12	Danielle You	Halswell United	Home	14'	0–1	0–10	Cashmere Technical	12 July 2025
12	Rebecca Gillett	Nomads–Waimakariri United	Home	79'	0–3	0–3	Otago University	13 July 2025
13	Jemimah O'Donnell	Nelson Suburbs	Away	50'	1–3	1–5	Halswell Untied	20 July 2025
14	Meghan Moffat	Halswell United	Away	30'	4–0	7–0	Nomads–Waimakariri United	26 July 2025

==== Hawkey Shield ====
Hawkey Shield
- Season: 2025
- Dates: 18 April - 27 August
- Champions: Cashmere Technical
- Matches: 4
- Goals: 28 (7 per match)
- Biggest home win: Coastal Spirit; 7 – 1 Halswell United
- Biggest away win: Coastal Spirit; 1 – 4 Cashmere Technical

The Hawkey Shield is a Challenge Shield, where only teams from Christchurch challenge for the shield. It is only up for challenge when the current holders plays a league home game, cups competitions are not challenge games. The challenging team need to win against the current holders in order for the shield to change hands; if the match is a draw, the current holders retain the shield.

The Hawkey Shield current holders are Coastal Spirit, who have defended it for eight years in a row, holding the shield since 2017. They have successfully defended it more than 32 times from 2019 to 2024. They have successfully defended against; University of Canterbury nine times, Cashmere Technical eight times, Halswell United seven times, Waimakariri United four times, Nomads United and Ferrymead Bays both twice and Selwyn United once.

Coastal Spirit's next match is against Cashmere Technical at Tāne Norton Park on 10 August. They have had two successful defenses, one defense was against University of Canterbury, the other defense against Halswell United.

===== Hawkey Shield Matches =====
Match 1

18 April Round 4	Coastal Spirit	4–2	University of Canterbury	Linwood
12:30	Morrow 22'; Dias 36', 36', 86'; Hawkins (yellow card) 45'	Report	Hartshaw 45+1' (pen.); Thompson (yellow card) 53'; Deane 84'	Stadium: Tāne Norton Park; Referee: Iain Marshall

Match 2

25 May Round 8	Coastal Spirit	7–1	Halswell United	Linwood
11:00	Dias 6'; Nicholson 52', 64', 74'; Morrow 53'; Lyon 56'; McEwan (yellow card) 80'; Berry 83'	Report	Hartel (yellow card) 80' (goal) 81'	Stadium: Tāne Norton Park; Referee: Aaron Nottage

Match 3

10 August Round 16	Coastal Spirit	1–4	Cashmere Technical	Linwood
14:45		Report		Stadium: Tāne Norton Park; Referee: Joe Field

Match 4

27 August Round 17	Cashmere Technical	7–2	University of Canterbury	St Albans
19:30		Report		Stadium: English Park

=== Canterbury Women's Premiership League ===
Canterbury Women's Premiership League
- Season: 2025
- Dates: 5 April - 30 August
- Matches: 48
- Goals: 183 (3.81 per match)
- All statistics correct as of 4 August.

The 2025 Canterbury Women's Premiership League is the 1st full season of premiership football in the Canterbury region, 4th since the restructure of the leagues. The League started on 5 April and finishes on 30 August, with league format being a triple round robin.

==== Women's Premiership teams ====
Six teams are competing in the league.

Team	Location	Home ground	Manager	Captain	2024 season
Cashmere Technical Reserves	Woolston	Garrick Memorial Park	Brian Hoover	Holly-Rose Munsey	7th
Ferrymead Bays Blue	Ferrymead	Ferrymead Park	Neil Warburton	Cheyenne Welsh	6th
Halswell United Reserves	Halswell	Halswell Domain	Ian Thomas	Johanna Keer-Keer	1st in Division 1 (promoted)
Nomads-Waimakariri United	Casebrook	Tulett Park	Simon Tippen	Madison Silcock	4th in Championship (promoted)
Nomads-Waimakariri United	Kaiapoi	Kendal Park	Simon Tippen	Madison Silcock	4th in Championship (promoted)
Selwyn United	Rolleston	Foster Park	Jacob Grosvenor	Eleanor Coshall	5th
University of Canterbury 2nd XI	St Albans	English Park	Jonte Clifton	Lucy Johnston	New entry

==== Women's Premiership table ====
Pos	Team	Pld	W	D	L	GF	GA	GD	Pts	Qualification
1	Selwyn United	16	11	2	3	43	17	+26	35	Winners of Women's Premiership League
2	Ferrymead Bays Blue	16	9	3	4	38	18	+20	30	Possible qualification to South Island League (Note: If highest ranked first team; doesn't nominate themselves to be considered for promotion or decline participation for the playoffs, the second highest ranked first team is nominated)
3	Cashmere Technical Reserves (Note: Unable to be promoted to South Island League due to already having a side in the South Island League; therefore are ineligible to be considered for the 'Playoff Series'.)	16	9	1	6	32	25	+7	28	
4	University of Canterbury 2nd XI	16	8	3	5	27	24	+3	27	
5	Nomads-Waimakariri United Reserves	16	3	2	11	23	51	−28	11	
6	Halswell United Reserves	16	2	1	13	20	48	−28	7	

Updated to match(es) played on 4 August. Source: Mainland Football
Rules for classification: 1) Points; 2) Head to head; 3) Disciplinary record; 4) Coin toss

==== Women's Premiership results table ====
Home \ Away	CAS	FMB	HAL	NWU	SEL	UC2	CAS	FMB	HAL	NWU	SEL	UC2
Cashmere Technical Reserves		1–0	5–0	8–2	2–3	2–0		0–3	4–2		1–1	
Ferrymead Bays Blue	2–3		4–1	5–2	0–5	0–0			2–0	5–0		1–1
Halswell United Reserves	4–1	2–1		0–2	1–2	2–3				4–4	1–5	1–2
Nomads-Waimakariri United Reserves	0–3 (Note: Nomads-Waimakariri United defaulted)	0–4	3–0		0–2	3–3	0–1	0–5			5–3	
Selwyn United	1–0	1–1	4–1	3–0		2–0	4–0	1–2				5–1
University of Canterbury 2nd XI	0–1	1–3	1–0	2–1	2–1		3–0		5–1	3–1		

Updated to match(es) played on 4 August. Source: Mainland Football
Legend: Blue = home team win; Yellow = draw; Red = away team win.

==== Women's Premiership scoring ====
As of 4 August

===== Women's Premiership hat-tricks =====
Round	Player	For	Against	Home/Away	Result	Date
1	Marli Gallagher	Ferrymead Bays Blue	Nomads-Waimakariri United Reserves	Away	0–4	5 April 2025
8	Savannah Olsen	Cashmere Technical Reserves	Nomads-Waimakariri United Reserves	Home	8–2	7 June 2025
8	Kaia Smith	Cashmere Technical Reserves	Nomads-Waimakariri United Reserves	Home	8–2	7 June 2025
9	Abby Taylor	Nomads-Waimakariri United Reserves	Halswell United Reserves	Home	3–0	14 June 2025
12	Tessa Toombs	Cashmere Technical Reserves	Halswell United Reserves	Home	4–2	5 July 2025
15	Abby Taylor	Nomads-Waimakariri United Reserves	Selwyn United	Home	5–3	26 July 2025

===== Women's Premiership own goals =====
Round	Player	Club	H/A	Time	Goal	Result	Opponent	Date
1	Taylor Gordon	Cashmere Technical Reserves	Home	56'	1–2	2–3	Selwyn United	5 April 2025
2	Robyn Warburton	Ferrymead Bays Blue	Away	9'	1–0	1–1	Selwyn United	12 April 2025

=== Canterbury Women's Championship League ===
Canterbury Women's Championship League
- Season: 2025
- Dates: 5 April - 23 August
- Matches: 24
- Goals: 73 (3.04 per match)
- All statistics correct as of 2 August.

The 2025 Canterbury Women's Championship League is the 1st full season of championship football in the Canterbury region, 4th since the restructure of the leagues. The League started on 5 April and finishes on 23 August, with league format being a double round robin.

Between 6 June and 13 July, Cashmere Technical U20 Reserves were withdrawn from the competition. All game results against Cashmere Technical U20 Reserves have been voided.

==== Women's Championship teams ====
Six teams are competing in the league. Before the start of the season, Ferrymead Bays pull out from the competition.

Team	Location	Home ground	2024 season
~~Cashmere Technical U20~~	~~Woolston~~	~~Garrick Memorial Park~~	~~New Entry~~
Coastal Spirit	Bromley	Linfield Park	6th
FC Twenty 11	Avonhead	Avonhead Park	1st
Halswell United Green	Halswell	Halswell Domain	3rd
Hornby United	Hornby	Warren Park	5th
University of Canterbury 3rd XI Gold	Ilam	Ilam Fields	2nd
University of Canterbury 3rd XI Maroon	Ilam	Ilam Fields	4th in Premiership (relegated)

==== Canterbury Women's Championship table ====
Pos	Team	Pld	W	D	L	GF	GA	GD	Pts	Qualification
1	University of Canterbury 3rd XI Maroon	8	6	1	1	20	4	+16	19	Champions of Women's Championship Qualifying League
2	Halswell United Green	8	5	2	1	14	6	+8	17	
3	Coastal Spirit	8	4	1	3	17	15	+2	13	
4	Hornby United	8	2	2	4	11	14	−3	8	
5	University of Canterbury 3rd XI Gold	8	2	1	5	5	12	−7	7	
6	FC Twenty 11	8	1	1	6	6	22	−16	4	
7	Cashmere Technical U20 (W)	0	0	0	0	0	0	0	0	Withdrawn from the League

Updated to match(es) played on 2 August. Source: Mainland Football
Rules for classification: 1) Points; 2) Head to head; 3) Disciplinary record; 4) Coin toss
(W) Withdrawn from the League, all results voided

==== Women's Championship results table ====
Home \ Away	CSP	FCT	HAL	HOR	UCG	UCM
Coastal Spirit			1–3	2–1	1–0	0–4
FC Twenty 11	0–7		1–1	3–4	2–1	0–3
Halswell United Green	1–2	3–0		2–0	1–0	
Hornby United	2–2		1–2		1–2	1–0
University of Canterbury 3rd XI Gold		1–0		1–1		0–1
University of Canterbury 3rd XI Maroon	4–2	2–0	1–1		5–0	

Updated to match(es) played on 2 August. Source: Mainland Football
Legend: Blue = home team win; Yellow = draw; Red = away team win.

=== Nelson Bays Women's Premiership League ===
Nelson Bays Women's Premiership League
- Season: 2025
- Dates: 12 April - 6 September
- Matches: 55
- Goals: 358 (6.51 per match)

==== Nelson Women's Premiership teams ====
Nine teams are competing in the league - seven team from the previous season and two new teams. The two team are Richmond Swans and Wakefield; they replace Nelson Suburbs Swans

Team	Location	Home ground	2024 season
FC Nelson Diamonds	The Wood	Guppy Park	8th
Golden Bay Shield Maidens	Takaka	Takaka Rec Ground	4th
Mapua Cougars	Mapua	Mapua Domain	6th
Motueka Angels	Motueka	Memorial Park	7th
Nelson Suburbs Reserves	Stoke	Saxton Fields	2nd
Richmond Foxes	Richmond	Jubilee Park	1st
Richmond Swans	Richmond	Jubilee Park	New entry
Tahuna Breakers	Tāhunanui	Tāhunanui	5th
Wakefield	Wakefield	Wakefield Domain	New entry

==== Nelson Women's Premiership table ====
Pos	Team	Pld	W	D	L	GF	GA	GD	Pts	Qualification
1	Richmond Foxes	13	12	1	0	61	8	+53	37	Winners of Nelson Women's Premiership
2	Nelson Suburbs Reserves	13	9	3	1	69	11	+58	30	
3	Golden Bay Shield Maidens	12	7	3	2	46	15	+31	24	
4	Tahuna Breakers	13	7	1	5	61	31	+30	22	
5	Mapua Cougars	12	6	2	4	47	21	+26	20	
6	Richmond Swans	12	5	0	7	40	29	+11	15	
7	Motueka Angles	12	3	0	9	12	77	−65	9	
8	FC Nelson Diamonds	12	2	0	10	12	72	−60	6	
9	Wakefield	13	0	0	13	10	94	−84	0	

Updated to match(es) played on 9 August. Source: Nelson Bays Football
Rules for classification: 1) Points; 2) Goal difference; 3) Goals scored; All teams declared winners

== Cup competitions ==
=== English Cup ===
2025 English Cup
Tournament details
- Dates: 21 April - 7 September
- Teams: 15

Final positions
- Champions: Cashmere Technical
- Runners-up: Nomads United

Tournament statistics
- Matches played: 14
- Goals scored: 65 (4.64 per match)
- Top goal scorer(s): Omar Cameron and Lyle Mattysen (4 goals each)

Awards
- Steve Summer Medal: Lyle Mattysen

The 2025 English Cup is the 112th edition, the 105th time the trophy has been played for, of the English Cup.

==== English Cup teams ====
Team	2024 season	Team	2024 season
Burwood	R1	Oxford	QF
Cashmere Technical	2nd	Parklands United	QF
Christchurch United	SF	St Albans Shirley	R1
Coastal Spirit	1st	Selwyn United	R1
FC Twenty 11	R1	University of Canterbury	R1
Ferrymead Bays	SF	Waimakariri United	R1
Halswell United	R1	Western	SF
Nomads United	QF		

==== English Cup Bracket ====
Round 1
21 April
Selwyn United	2
Western	3
21 April
St Albans Shirley	0
Waimakariri United	1
21 April
Coastal Spirit	2
Oxford	0
21 April
Halswell United	2
FC Twenty 11	1
21 April
Christchurch United	5
University of Canterbury	0
21 April
Nomads United	14
Parklands United	0
21 April
Ferrymead Bays	8
Burwood	0

Quarter-final
10 June
Western	3
Cashmere Technical	4
20 May
Waimakariri United	0 (4)
Coastal Spirit	0 (2)
3 June
Halswell United	0
Christchurch United	1
1 July
Nomads United	1
Ferrymead Bays	0

Semi-final
29 July
Cashmere Technical	6
Waimakariri United	1
15 July
Christchurch United	2 (9)
Nomads United	2 (10)

Final
7 September
Cashmere Technical	5
Nomads United	1

==== English Cup Round 1 ====
Matches to played on Easter Monday of 21 April. Cashmere Technical received a bye to the quarter finals.

21 April	Coastal Spirit	2–0	Oxford	Bromley
14:00	Feng 27'; van der Kroon 86'	Report		Stadium: Linfield Park S2; Referee: Regan Preston

21 April	Selwyn United	2–3	Western	Rolleston
14:00	Otaki 62'; Carrodus 90'	Report	King 6'; Hodson-Seel 52'; Steffert 87'	Stadium: Foster Park; Referee: Thomas Lawson

21 April	Ferrymead Bays	8–0	Burwood	Ferrymead
14:00	Cameron 1', 47', 73', 88'; Deehan 10', 22'; Takahasi (yellow card) 20'; Nogami (yellow card) 42'; Williams 56', 90+3'	Report		Stadium: Ferrymead Park; Referee: Ali Muhammad

21 April	Christchurch United	5–0	University of Canterbury	Spreydon
14:00	Stevens 23'; Osawa 30', 52', 79'; van Rijssel 49'	Report	Killick (yellow card) 72'	Stadium: United Sports Centre; Referee: Caleb Downes

21 April	Halswell United	2–1	FC Twenty 11	St Albans
14:00	Rowe 6'; White 90+5'	Report	Inwood 25' (yellow card) 71'; Ahmadi (yellow card) 66' (yellow-red card) 81'; Unwin (yellow card) 86'	Stadium: English Park; Referee: Iain Marshall

21 April	St Albans Shirley	0–1	Waimakariri United	St Albans
14:00		Report	Reid 65'	Stadium: St Albans Park; Referee: Mark Currie

21 April	Nomads United	14–0	Parklands United	Casebrook
14:00	Eminson 2' (o.g.); Bushell 5', 9', 14'; Vaszilyko 13'; Goldsmith 21', 45'; MacLeod-Watts 37'; McKee 49'; Stewart 54'; McIntyre 67', 75', 89'; Litt 78'	Report		Stadium: Tulett Park; Referee: Yash Naicker

==== English Cup Quarter-final ====
Matches to played on Tuesday nights between May and July.

20 May	Waimakariri United	0–0 (4–2 p)	Coastal Spirit	St Albans
19:30	Morris (yellow card) 71'	Report		Stadium: English Park; Referee: Thomas Lawson
	Penalties
	Morris (penalty scored); Elmohib (penalty scored); Reid (penalty scored); Wright (penalty scored)		(penalty scored) Stearn; (penalty missed) de Groot-Green; (penalty scored) Bell; (penalty missed) Hoole

3 June	Halswell United	0–1	Christchurch United	St Albans
19:30	Ede (yellow card) 36'	Report	Chao 33'	Stadium: English Park; Referee: Aaron Nottage

10 June	Western	3–4	Cashmere Technical	St Albans
19:30	Co. Brandon 45+2'; Ch. Brandon 59', 90+4'; Lund (yellow card) 81'	Report	Peacocke 9', 41'; Tyndall 90+4'; Burge 90+6'	Stadium: English Park; Referee: Thomas Lawson

1 July	Nomads United	2–0	Ferrymead Bays	St Albans
19:30	Cottom 56' (pen.); Holdem 75' (yellow card) 88'; Reeves (yellow card) 78'	Report	Stanton (yellow card) 31'	Stadium: English Park; Referee: Aaron Nottage

==== English Cup Semi-final ====
Matches to played on Tuesday nights in-between July.

15 July	Christchurch United	2–2 (a.e.t.) (9–10 p)	Nomads United	St Albans
19:30	Graham (yellow card) 43'; Stevens (yellow card) 45+3'; Beale 62'; Tasip (yellow card) 70'; Osawa 84'; Tollervey (yellow card) 90+1'	Report	McKee 42'; Johnson 77'	Stadium: English Park; Referee: Aaron Nottage
	Penalties
	van Rijssel (penalty scored); Graham (penalty scored); Beale (penalty scored); Grover (penalty missed); Godden (penalty scored); Cole (penalty missed); Tasip (penalty scored); Rogerson (penalty scored); Henry (penalty scored); Walker (penalty scored); Graney (penalty scored); van Rijssel (penalty missed)		Cottom (penalty missed); Goldsmith (penalty scored); Holdem (penalty scored); McIntyre (penalty scored); Johnson (penalty scored); Metherell (penalty missed); Holland (penalty scored); Collett (penalty scored); Sandys (penalty scored); Gillett (penalty scored); Frame (penalty scored); Cottom (penalty scored)

29 July	Cashmere Technical	6–1	Waimakariri United	St Albans
19:30	Caughey 18' (yellow card) 84'; Coughlan 27' (pen.); Matthysen 42'; Carswell 45+1'; Taguchi 53'; Gallaway 88'	Report	Vialoux 8'; Quigley (yellow card) 67'	Stadium: English Park; Referee: Michael Killick

==== English Cup Final ====
7 September
15:00

Cashmere Technical	5–1	Nomads United
Mattysen 2', 29', 45' (yellow card) 89'; Coughlan 57'; Angus (yellow card) 78'; Caughey 87'	Report	Stewart (yellow card) 19'; Sandys (yellow card) 90'; Holland (yellow card) 90'

English Park, St Albans
Referee: Ralph Clink

This is Cashmere Technical's 9th English Cup Final in a row and Nomad United's first final since 2008.

==== English Cup Goalscorers ====
There have been 65 goals scored in 14 matches, for an average of 4.64 goals per match (as of 7 September 2025).

4 goals

- Cashmere Technical – Lyle Matthysen
- Ferrymead Bays – Omar Cameron

3 goals

- Christchurch United – Joel Stevens
- Nomads United – Harry Bushell
- Nomads United – Angus McIntyre

2 goals

- Cashmere Technical – Garbhan Coughlan
- Cashmere Technical – Gabriel Gallaway
- Cashmere Technical – Charlie Peacocke
- Christchurch United – Shogo Osawa
- Ferrymead Bays – James Deehan
- Ferrymead Bays – Rhys Williams
- Nomads United – Cooper Goldsmith
- Nomads United – Will McKee
- Weston – Chris Brandon

1 goal

- Cashmere Technical – Jesse Burge
- Cashmere Technical – Lewis Carswell
- Cashmere Technical – Finn Caughey
- Cashmere Technical – Yuya Taguchi
- Cashmere Technical – Declan Tyndall
- Christchurch United – Charlie Beale
- Christchurch United – Thomas Chao
- Christchurch United – Oliver van Rijssel
- Coastal Spirit – Hugo Feng
- Coastal Spirit – Aiden van der Kroon
- FC Twenty 11 – Jonathan Inwood
- Halswell United – Harri Rowe
- Halswell United – Luke White
- Nomads United – Caleb Cottom
- Nomads United – Flynn Holdem
- Nomads United – Caleb Johnson
- Nomads United – Joshua Litt
- Nomads United – Luca MacLeod-Watts
- Nomads United – Thomas Stewart
- Nomads United – Memphis Vaszilyko
- Nomads United – Unknown
- Selwyn United – Jamie Carrodus
- Selwyn United – Lua Otaki
- Waimakariri United – Lucas Reid
- Waimakariri United – Joshua Vialoux
- Weston – Connor Brandon
- Weston – Nicholas King
- Weston – Robin Hodson-Seel
- Weston – Daniel Steffert

1 own goal

- Parklands United – Tom Eminson (against Nomads United)

=== Reta Fitzpatrick Cup ===
2025 Reta Fitzpatrick Cup
Tournament details
- Dates: 25 April - 7 September
- Teams: 9

Final positions
- Champions: Cashmere Technical
- Runners-up: University of Canterbury

Tournament statistics
- Matches played: 8
- Goals scored: 40 (5 per match)
- Top goal scorer: Katie Harris (5 goals)

The 2025 Reta Fitzpatrick Cup is the 51st edition, the 47th time the trophy has been played for, of the Reta Fitzpatrick Cup.

==== Reta Fitzpatrick Cup teams ====
Team	2024 season
Cashmere Technical	1st
Coastal Spirit	SF
FC Twenty 11	R1
Ferrymead Bays	QF
Halswell United	SF
Nomads-Waimakariri United	QF
Hornby United	QF
Selwyn United	SF
University of Canterbury	QF

==== Reta Fitzpatrick Cup Bracket ====
Round 1
21 April
Hornby United	0 (4)
FC Twenty 11	0 (3)

Quarter-final
28 May
Hornby United	0
University of Canterbury	9
25 July
Nomads-Waimakariri United	1 (5)
Coastal Spirit	1 (4)
6 July
Selwyn United	2
Halswell United	1
14 May
Ferrymead Bays	2
Cashmere Technical	8

Semi-final
23 July
University of Canterbury	6
Nomads-Waimakariri United	0
6 August
Selwyn United	0
Cashmere Technical	5

Final
7 September
University of Canterbury	0
Cashmere Technical	5

==== Reta Fitzpatrick Cup Round 1 ====
Match to played on 23 April. All other team received a bye to the quarter finals.

23 April	Hornby United	0–0 (4–3 p)	FC Twenty 11	Avonhead
19:00		Report		Stadium: Avonhead Park; Referee: Ravinesh Kumar
	Penalties
	Blair (penalty scored); Woodgate (penalty scored); Worsley (penalty scored); Vialoux (penalty missed); Morris (penalty scored)		Dawson (penalty missed); Tizzard (penalty scored); Robertson (penalty scored); van Wyk (penalty scored); Weston (penalty missed)

==== Reta Fitzpatrick Cup Quarter-final ====
Matches to played on Wednesday nights between May and August.

14 May	Ferrymead Bays	2–8	Cashmere Technical	St Albans
19:30	Warburton 19'; Willetts-Falconer 33'; Lemon (yellow card) 87'	Report	Luxton 9'; Loye 17'; da Costa Canal 23' (pen.); McGeehan 40'; Buyck 61', 66'; Harris 90+2', 90+5'	Stadium: English Park; Referee: Nathan Cottom

28 May	Hornby United	0–9	University of Canterbury	St Albans
19:30		Report	Dixon 9'; Roxbrugh 17', 18'; Brown 29', 77'; Herman 38'; Slaughter 40'; Spear 50'; Thompson (yellow card) 75'; Burns 90'	Stadium: English Park; Referee: Nathan Cottom

11 July	Selwyn United	2–1	Halswell United	St Albans
19:30	Pettigrew 4'; Shepherd 30'	Report	Hartel 90+3'	Stadium: English Park; Referee: Aaron Wilton

25 July	Nomads-Waimakariri United	1–1 (5–4 p)	Coastal Spirit	St Albans
19:30	Nicholson 57'	Report	Hewitt 58'	Stadium: English Park; Referee: Ravinesh Kumar

==== Reta Fitzpatrick Cup Semi-final ====
Matches to played on Tuesday nights between July and August.

23 July	University of Canterbury	6–0	Nomads-Waimakariri United	St Albans
19:00	Mckenzie 3'; Deane 25', 40', 65'; Holland 45+5'; Lazo 51'; Wilkinson (yellow card) 75'	Report	Smith (yellow card) 29'	Stadium: English Park; Referee: Roelof Boiten

6 August	Selwyn United	0–5	Cashmere Technical	St Albans
19:00		Report	Harris 10', 28', 80'; Brugh 35'; Pelham 45+1'	Stadium: English Park; Referee: Simon Yeadon

==== Reta Fitzpatrick Cup Final ====
7 September	University of Canterbury	5–0	Cashmere Technical	St Albans
12:00	Stephan 6', 35'; Pelham 52'; Toombs 70', 81'	Report	van der Sluis (yellow card) 67'	Stadium: English Park; Referee: Ali Muhammad

==== Reta Fitzpatrick Cup Goalscorers ====
There have been 40 goals scored in 8 matches, for an average of 5 goals per match (as of 7 September 2025).

5 goals

- Cashmere Technical - Katie Harris

3 goals

- University of Canterbury - Liv Deane

2 goals

- Cashmere Technical - Petra Buyck
- Cashmere Technical - Saskia Pelham
- Cashmere Technical - Anya Stephan
- Cashmere Technical - Tessa Florence Toombs
- University of Canterbury - Caylee-Grace Brown
- University of Canterbury - Erin Roxbrugh

1 goal

- Cashmere Technical - Katie Brugh
- Cashmere Technical - Ruby Luxton
- Cashmere Technical - Kate Loye
- Cashmere Technical - Hannah McGeehan
- Cashmere Technical - Rafaela da Costa Canal
- Coastal Spirit - Britney-lee Nicholson
- Nomads-Waimakariri United - Rebecca Hewitt
- Selwyn United - Chloe Pettigrew
- Selwyn United - Melanie Shepherd
- Halswell United - Ella Hartel
- Ferrymead Bays - Robyn Warburton
- Ferrymead Bays - Riley Willetts-Falconer
- University of Canterbury - Tessa Burns
- University of Canterbury - Ruby Dixon
- University of Canterbury - Olivia Herman
- University of Canterbury - Cecily Holland
- University of Canterbury - Kyra Lazo
- University of Canterbury - Hannah Mckenzie
- University of Canterbury - Olivia Slaughter
- University of Canterbury - Allie Spear

== Charity cups ==
=== Whero Cup ===
2025 Whero Cup
Tournament details
- Dates: 25 April - 10 September
- Teams: 26

Final positions
- Champions: Ferrymead Bays U20 (1st title)
- Runners-up: Coastal Spirit U20

Tournament statistics
- Matches played: 25
- Goals scored: 94 (3.76 per match)

The 2025 Whero Cup is a Charity cup competition for all teams in Canterbury Men's Championship League and Men's Division 1 as well as the reserve teams from Canterbury Men's Premiership League. This is the 3rd edition of the Whero Cup.

This season the cup will help raise awareness and support for Christchurch City Mission (Christchurch City Mission), after two seasons of raise awareness and support for Ronald McDonald House South Island.

==== Whero Cup teams ====
This season, Men's Division 2 teams are not competing, where they will compete in the I Am Hope Pango Cup. This is Parkland United's first season in the cup, Cashmere Technical Originals and FC Twenty 11 Goats as well. Cashmere Technical Turtles, Christchurch United Division 1 and Ferrymead Bays Baby Blue's are teams that aren't competing this season

CCL	2024 season	MD1	2024 season	CPL	2024 season
Cashmere Technical U20 (2)	SF	Cashmere Technical Jets	R2	Cashmere Technical U20	R2
Coastal Spirit U20	R2	Cashmere Technical Originals	DNP	Christchurch United U20	R1
FC Twenty 11 Reserves	R1	FC Twenty 11 Goats	DNP	Ferrymead Bays U20	QF
Ferrymead Bays Keen Lads	R2	Halswell United 1964	R1	Nomads United U20	R2
Halswell United Reserves	QF	Mid Canterbury United Blue	R1	Selwyn United U20	2nd
Oxford	QF	Nomads United Div 1	R1	University of Canterbury U20	SF
Parklands United	DNP	University of Canterbury 4th XI	R1		
Selwyn United Turkeys	R2	UCAFC Burger Station	R1		
University of Canterbury 3rd XI	1st	Western Reserves Bombers	R2		
Waimakariri United Reserves	R1	Western Rhinos	QF		

==== Whero Cup Round 1 ====
Matches to played on ANZAC day. All Premiership reserves teams receive a bye to the second round.

25 April	Cashmere Technical Originals	2–3	Selwyn United Turkeys	Waltham
14:00		Report		Stadium: Lancaster Park

25 April	Halswell United 1964	1–4	Cashmere Technical Jets	Wigram
14:00		Report		Stadium: Te Kahu Park

25 April	Coastal Spirit U20	3–0	~~FC Twenty 11 Reserves~~	Bromley
14:00		Report		Stadium: Linfield Park
Note: FC Twenty 11 Reserves defaulted

25 April	UCAFC Burger Station	3–0	Halswell United Reserves	Ilam
14:00		Report		Stadium: Ilam Fields

25 April	Ferrymead Bays Keen Lads	4–0	Western Reserve Bombers	Ferrymead
14:00		Report		Stadium: Ferrymead Park; Referee: Robert William Noster

25 April	FC Twenty 11 Goats	5–1	Mid Canterbury United Blue	Avonhead
14:00		Report		Stadium: Avonhead Park; Referee: Chris O'Connell

25 April	Nomads United Div 1	0–1	Cashmere Technical U20 (2)	Casebrook
14:00		Report	Collins 7'	Stadium: Tulett Park; Referee: Ali Muhammad

25 April	Waimakariri United Reserves	3–3 (4-3 p)	University of Canterbury 3rd XI	Kaiapoi
14:00		Report		Stadium: Kendall Park; Referee: Roelof Boiten

25 April	Oxford	3–0	~~University of Canterbury 4th XI~~	Oxford
14:00		Report		Stadium: Pearsons Park
Note: University of Canterbury 4th XI defaulted

30 April	Western Rhinos	0–3	Parklands United	St Albans
19:45		Report	Collins 23'; Collins 25'; Collins 56'	Stadium: English Park; Referee: Roelof Boiten

==== Whero Cup Round 2 ====
Matches to played on 10 May.

10 May	Ferrymead Bays Keen Lads	0–5	Christchurch United U20	Ferrymead
12:30	Merkin 72' (o.g.); Aspinall (yellow card) 85'	Report	Oulsnam 7'; Huxford (yellow card) 25' (goal) 77'; Unknown; Unknown	Stadium: Ferrymead Park S3; Referee: Subho Sarkar

10 May	Ferrymead Bays U20	2–0	Nomads United U20	Ferrymead
12:30	Kemp 32', 36'; Daeche (yellow card) 48'	Report	Gillett (yellow card) 86'; Redman (yellow card) 88'	Stadium: Ferrymead Park S1; Referee: Paul Pace

10 May	University of Canterbury U20	2–2 (4-2 p)	Cashmere Technical Jets	Ilam
12:30	Sweetman (yellow card) 25'; Corbett 83', 85' (pen.)	Report	No line-up submitted	Stadium: Ilam Fields S2; Referee: Iain Marshall

10 May	Selwyn United U20	3–0	Cashmere Technical U20 (2)	Rolleston
12:30	Fraser 66'; Moore 79'; Barrett 84'	Report		Stadium: Foster Park S1; Referee: Robert Noster

10 May	FC Twenty 11 Goats	3–1	Waimakariri United Reserves	Avonhead
14:30	No line-up submitted	Report	No line-up submitted	Stadium: Avonhead Park S7

10 May	Selwyn United Turkeys	1–1 (7-6 p)	Oxford	Rolleston
14:30	Davey-Brown 26'; Sweetman (yellow card) 25'	Report	Durand 29'	Stadium: Foster Park S4; Referee: Craig Thurlow

10 May	Parklands United	1–4	Coastal Spirit U20	Parklands
14:30	Nicol 20'	Report	Jones 15', 52'; Docherty (yellow card) 33'; Anngow (yellow card) 84'; Carswell 85', 90'; Williams (yellow card) 90'	Stadium: Parklands Reserve S1; Referee: Charles Loughnan

10 May	UCAFC Burger Station	0–2	Cashmere Technical U20	Ilam
14:30		Report	Taylor 33'; Unknown	Stadium: Ilam Fields S4; Referee: Michael Field

==== Whero Cup Quarter Final ====
Matches to played on 22 June.

22 June	Selwyn United U20	3–2	University of Canterbury U20	Rolleston
12:00	No timeline submitted	Report	No timeline submitted	Stadium: Foster Park S1

22 June	Cashmere Technical Reserves	0–1	Coastal Spirit U20	St Albans
14:30	Unknown (o.g.)	Report	No timeline submitted	Stadium: English Park; Referee: Michael Field

22 June	Selwyn United Turkeys	2–4	Ferrymead Bays U20	Rolleston
14:30	No timeline submitted	Report	No timeline submitted	Stadium: Foster Park S4

2 July	FC Twenty 11 Goats	0–2	Christchurch United U20	Rolleston
12:30		Report	Barrett 37'; Oulsnam 60', 80'	Stadium: Foster Park S1; Referee: Michael Field

==== Whero Cup Semi Final ====
Matches to played on 21 July.

21 July	Selwyn United U20	1–4	Coastal Spirit U20	Rolleston
19:00	Cole (yellow card) 76'; Fraser (yellow card) 90'; Unknown	Report	Feng 29'; Afenyo (yellow card) 34' (goal) 69'; Croton 60'; Hibbs (yellow card) 64'; a 89'; Gutierez 90'	Stadium: Foster Park S1; Referee: Alessandro Cvasniuc

21 July	Ferrymead Bays U20	3–1	Christchurch United U20	Ferrymead
19:00	Kemp 22'; Daeche 27'; Moores 90'	Report	Huxford 6'; Duncan (yellow card) 26'	Stadium: Ferrymead Park; Referee: Ali Muhammad

==== Whero Cup Final ====
Match to played on 10 September.

10 September	Coastal Spirit U20	1–4	Ferrymead Bays U20	St Albans
19:00		Report		Stadium: English Park; Referee: Roelof Boiten

=== Māwhero Cup ===
2025 Māwhero Cup
Tournament details
- Dates: 25 April - 16 August
- Teams: 29

Tournament statistics
- Goals scored: 0

The 2025 Māwhero Cup is the Women's Charity Cup competition for all Women's teams competing in a Mainland Football competition in the Canterbury Championship League, Division 1 and Sunday League teams. This is the 1st edition of the Women's Charity Cup.

This season the cup will help raise awareness and support for Chch Aunties.

==== Māwhero Cup teams ====
Championship	Division 1	Sunday League
Cashmere Technical U20	Cashmere Technical Blue	Burnham Bobcats
Coastal Spirit Reserves	Ferrymead Bays White	Coastal Spirit Orcas
FC Twenty 11	Halswell United Hawks	Ferrymead Bays Fury
Halswell United Green	Papanui-Redwood Foot Challenged	Halswell United Honeys
University of Canterbury 3rd XI Gold	Selwyn United Reserves	Hornby United
University of Canterbury 3rd XI Maroon	University of Canterbury Dragons	Hornby Womens
	University of Canterbury Unicorns	University of Canterbury Foxes
	University of Canterbury Warriors	Waimakariri United Blue
		Waimakariri United Red
Western Boom
Western Princesses
Western Rebels

==== Māwhero Cup Round 1 ====
Matches to played over ANZAC weekend of 25 April. Both Waimakariri United teams (Blue and Red) and UCAFC 3rd XI Maroon receive a bye to the second round.

25 April	Western Boom	v	Western Princesses	Merivale
14:00		Report		Stadium: Elmwood Park

25 April	UCAFC Unicorns	v	UCAFC 3rd XI Gold	Ilam
14:00		Report		Stadium: Ilam Fields

25 April	UCAFC Warriors	v	Papanui-Redwood Foot Challenged	Avonhead
14:00		Report		Stadium: Ferrier Park

25 April	UCAFC Burger Station	v	Halswell United Reserves	Ilam
14:00		Report		Stadium: Ilam Fields

25 April	Ferrymead Bays Fury	v	Ferrymead Bays White	Redcliffs
14:00		Report		Stadium: Barnett Park

25 April	UCAFC Foxes	v	Selwyn United Reserves	Ilam
14:00		Report		Stadium: Ilam Fields

25 April	Coastal Spirit Orcas	v	Hornby United	Bromley
14:00		Report		Stadium: Cuthberts Green

25 April	Cashmere Technical Blue	v	FC Twenty 11	Hillmorton
14:00		Report		Stadium: Nga Puna Wai

25 April	Coastal Spirit Reserves	v	Halswell United Hawks	Bromley
14:00		Report		Stadium: Cuthberts Green (Linfield Park)

25 April	UCAFC Dragons	v	Halswell United Green	Ilam
14:00		Report		Stadium: Ilam Fields

25 April	Hornby Womens	v	Hornby United	Hornby
14:00		Report		Stadium: Warren Park

25 April	Western Rebels	v	Burnham Bobcats	Mairehau
14:00		Report		Stadium: Walter Park

25 April	Cashmere Technical U20	v	Halswell United Honeys	Woolston
14:00		Report		Stadium: Garrick Memorial Park
