= Adam Highfield =

New Zealand footballer

Personal information
- Full name: Adam Highfield
- Date of birth: 1 March 1981 (age 45)
- Place of birth: New Zealand
- Position: Goalkeeper

Team information
- Current team: Coastal Spirit
- Number: 20

Senior career*
Years	Team	Apps	(Gls)
2002	FC Jokerit		(0)
2005	Atlantis FC		(0)
2006–2010	Canterbury United	11	(0)
2010–2011	Otago United	6	(0)
2011–2015	Canterbury United	13	(0)
2015–????	Ferrymead Bays		(0)
2022	Christchurch United	0	(0)
2023	Nelson Suburbs	1	(0)
2024	Coastal Spirit	1	(0)

International career
2001	New Zealand U-20	6	(0)
- * Club domestic league appearances and goals as of 9 June 2024

Adam Highfield (born 1 March 1981) is a New Zealand football goalkeeper who currently plays for Coastal Spirit in the Southern League. He has previously played for Canterbury United and Otago United in the New Zealand Football Championship, Ferrymead Bays in the Mainland Premier League, Christchurch United and Nelson Suburbs in the Southern League, FC Jokerit and Atlantis FC in Finland.

== Early life ==
Highfield was born in Christchurch before moving to Wales as a two-year-old, returning to New Zealand at the age of 10. He attended St Thomas of Canterbury College.

== Club career ==
Highfield played for Finnish side FC Jokerit, and later for Atlantis FC before returning to New Zealand in 2006 on loan to Canterbury United of the New Zealand Football Championship. He returned to Atlantis for the 2007 season.

In 2015, Highfield played his 100th match in the New Zealand Football Championship.

In 2022, Highfield was on the bench for Christchurch United's final day league winning win against Mosgiel, winning 10–0. In 2023, Highfield moved to Nelson to play for Nelson Suburbs, with his only appearance being in the 6–0 away in against FC Twenty 11.

In 2024, Highfield played for Coastal Spirit in their Hurley Shield defense against University of Canterbury winning 5–1, after regular goalkeeper Ellis Hare-Reid was away overseas.

== International career ==
Highfield represented New Zealand at under 20 level.

In the lead-up to New Zealand's opening Olympic qualifier in 2004, Highfield fractured his wrist, ruling him out of the All Whites' qualifying campaign.

In 2002, Highfield was called up for a New Zealand tour of Poland and Estonia, though he did not make an onfield appearance.

== Honours ==
Individual

- Mainland Football Mens Goalkeeper of the Year: 2011, 2012
- Mainland Football Mens Player of the Year: 2011
