= Mainland Football =

Federation of New Zealand Football

- Founded: 2000
- Headquarters: English Park
- Location: 127 Cranford Street, St Albans, Christchurch
- FIFA affiliation: New Zealand Football
- Chief Executive: Martin Field Dodgson
- Website: Official website

Mainland Football is one of six federations of New Zealand Football, representing regions of Northern and Central Canterbury, Tasman, Nelson, Marlborough and the West Coast.

== History ==
Canterbury United Pride was founded in 2002, to represent the region for the New Zealand Women's National League from its inaugural season in 2002 onwards.

Canterbury United Dragons was founded in 2002 as a conglomerate of various Christchurch area clubs, in order to form a strong team to take part in the 2002 New Zealand National Soccer League. In 2004, the league was replaced by the New Zealand Football Championship, run on a regional franchise basis, and Canterbury United became one of the eight competing teams. In 2021, the league was replaced by New Zealand National League for more of a club based competition, causing the Canterbury Dragons to dissolve.

== Competitions ==
Leagues

- Men's Leagues
  - Southern League
  - Canterbury Premiership League
  - Canterbury Championship League
  - Nelson Premiership
- Women's Leagues
  - South Island League
  - Canterbury Women's Premiership League
  - Canterbury Women's Championship League
  - Nelson Women's Premiership

Cups

- English Cup
- Reta Fitzpatrick Cup

Men's Charity Cups

- Whero Cup
- Pango Cup
- Karaka Cup
- Kākāriki Cup

Women's Charity Cups

- Māwhero Cup

Note: Southern League and South Island League includes teams from the Southern Football Federation and is a National competition run by New Zealand Football and managed by Mainland Football.

== Current title holders ==
Competition	Year	Champions	Runners-ups	Next edition
Senior (Men's)
Southern League	2025	Coastal Spirit	Christchurch United	2026
Canterbury Premiership League	2025	Christchurch United U20 Reserves	Halswell United	2026
Canterbury Championship League	2025	Selwyn United Turkeys	Ferrymead Bays Keen Lads	2026
Nelson Premiership League	2025	FC Nelson	Rangers AFC	2026
English Cup	2025	Cashmere Technical	Nomads United	2026
Whero Cup	2025	Ferrymead Bays U20 Reserves	Coastal Spirit U20 Reserves	2026
Hurley Shield (Note: Team that holds the shield when the season ends)	2025	Coastal Spirit	—N/a	2026
Senior (Women's)
South Island League	2025	Dunedin City Royals	Otago University	2026
Canterbury Women's Premiership League	2025	Selwyn United	Cashmere Technical Reserves	2026
Canterbury Women's Championship League	2025	University of Canterbury 3rd Maroon	Halswell United Green	2026
Nelson Women's Premiership League	2025	Richmond Athletic	Nelson Suburbs Reserves	2026
Reta Fitzpatrick Cup	2025	Cashmere Technical	University of Canterbury	2026
Māwhero Cup	2025	University of Canterbury 3rd Maroon	Western Boom	2026
Hawkey Shield	2025	Cashmere Technical	—N/a	2026

== Affiliated clubs ==
As of 2026.

Southern League Canterbury Cashmere Technical Christchurch United Coastal Spirit Ferrymead Bays Nomads United Selwyn United Nelson Nelson Suburbs	Canterbury Premiership Burwood Halswell United University of Canterbury Waimakariri United Western Canterbury Championship FC Twenty 11 Parklands United	Canterbury Banks Peninsula Burnham High School Old Boys Hornby United Hornby Women's Hurunui Rangers Methven Mid Canterbury United Oxford Papanui-Redwood Prebbleton St Albans Shirley	Marlborough Blenheim Valley Sports Central Picton Rangers Renwick Junior SC Trojans	Nelson FC Nelson Golden Bay Mapua Rangers Motueka Richmond Athletic Tahuna Wakefield

== Mainland Football Awards ==
Season	Men's Awards of the Year							
Season	Goalkeeper	Defender	Midfielder	Forward	Player	Youth	Golden Boot	Coach
2009	Chris Sinclair (Western)	Matt Boyd (Western)	Joe Murray (Woolston Technical)	Ewan Bakker (Halswell United)	Joe Murray (Woolston Technical)	Daniel Ede (Burnside)	Daniel Ede (Burnside)	Keith Braithwaite (Woolston Technical)
2010	—N/a							
2011	Adam Highfield (Ferrymead Bays)	Rhys Parker (Halswell United)	Geoffrey MacIntyre (Ferrymead Bays)	Mauricio de Oliveira (Ferrymead Bays)	Adam Highfield (Ferrymead Bays)	Ken Yamamoto (CSOF)	Mauricio de Oliveira (Ferrymead Bays)	Michael Braithwaite (Ferrymead Bays)
2012	Adam Highfield (Ferrymead Bays)	James Price (Cashmere Technical)	Josh Smith (Ferrymead Bays)	Russell Kamo (Ferrymead Bays)	Josh Smith (Ferrymead Bays)	Louis Bush (Cashmere Technical)	Gareth Turnbull (Coastal Spirit)	Michael Braithwaite (Ferrymead Bays)
2013	Coey Turipa (Nelson Suburbs)	Daniel Boys (Cashmere Technical)	Andy Pitman (Cashmere Technical)	Ben Wright (Nelson Suburbs)	Andy Pitman (Cashmere Technical)	Cory Mitchell (Cashmere Technical)	Russell Kamo (Ferrymead Bays)	John Brown (Cashmere Technical)
2014	Adam Highfield (Ferrymead Bays)	Tom Schwarz (Cashmere Technical)	Nick Wortelboer (Cashmere Technical)	Shawn O’Brien (Cashmere Technical)	Shawn O’Brien (Cashmere Technical)	Oscar Evans (Cashmere Technical)	Shawn O’Brien (Cashmere Technical)	John Brown (Cashmere Technical)
2015	Coey Turipa	Tom Schwarz	Atkin Kaua	Michael White	Michael White	Atkin Kaua	Michael White	John Brown
2016	Coey Turipa (Nelson Suburbs)	Sean Liddicoat (Coastal Spirit)	Jordan Halligan (Cashmere Technical)	Liam Oxley (Cashmere Technical)	Jordan Halligan (Cashmere Technical)	Lyle Matthysen (Cashmere Technical)	Andrew Tuckey (Ferrymead Bays)	Glenn Lapslie (FC Twenty 11)
2017	James Hinton (Western)	Tom Schwarz (Cashmere Technical)	Sean Morris (FC Twenty 11)	Lyle Matthysen (Cashmere Technical)	Sean Morris (FC Twenty 11)	Lyle Matthysen (Cashmere Technical)	Michael White (Cashmere Technical)	Danny Halligan (Ferrymead Bays)
2018	Corey Wilson (Nelson Suburbs)	Cory Vickers (Nomads United)	Luke Tongue (Cashmere Technical)	Stephen Hoyle (Nomads United)	Stephen Hoyle (Nomads United)	Byron Heath (Nomads United)	Stephen Hoyle (Nomads United)	Deane Hutchinson (Cashmere Technical)
2019	Corey Wilson (Nelson Suburbs)	Tom Schwarz (Cashmere Technical)	Luke Tongue (Cashmere Technical)	Cameron Gordon (Nelson Suburbs)	Tom Schwarz (Cashmere Technical)	Jordan Spain (Cashmere Technical)	Garbhan Coughlan (Cashmere Technical)	Steve Bignall (Nelson Suburbs)
2020	Danny Knight (Cashmere Technical)	Daniel Boys (Cashmere Technical)	Yuya Taguchi (Cashmere Technical)	Lyle Matthysen (Cashmere Technical)	Yuya Taguchi (Cashmere Technical)	Mika Rabuka (Coastal Spirit)	Lyle Matthysen (Cashmere Technical)	Deane Hutchinson (Cashmere Technical)
2021	Pieter-Taco Bierema (Selwyn United)	Tom Schwarz (Cashmere Technical)	Yuya Taguchi (Cashmere Technical)	Garbhan Coughlan (Cashmere Technical)	Garbhan Coughlan (Cashmere Technical)	Oliver Colloty (Christchurch United)	Lyle Matthysen (Cashmere Technical)	Dan Schwarz (Cashmere Technical)
2022	Scott Morris (Christchurch United)	Tom Schwarz (Cashmere Technical)	James McPhie (Nelson Suburbs)	Garbhan Coughlan (Cashmere Technical)	Garbhan Coughlan (Cashmere Technical)	Kian Donkers (Cashmere Technical)	Garbhan Coughlan (Cashmere Technical)	Paul Ifill (Christchurch United)
2023	Scott Morris (Christchurch United)	Aaron O'Driscoll (Christchurch United)	Matt Tod-Smith (Christchurch United)	Sam Philip (Christchurch United)	Aaron O'Driscoll (Christchurch United)	Jago Godden (Christchurch United)	Sam Philip (Christchurch United)	Paul Ifill (Christchurch United)
2024	Regan Frame (Nomads United)	Daniel Boys (Coastal Spirit)	David Yoo (Christchurch United)	Alex Steinwascher (Coastal Spirit)	Alex Steinwascher (Coastal Spirit)	Riley Grover (Christchurch United)	Garbhan Coughlan (Cashmere Technical)	Robbie Stanton (Coastal Spirit)
2025	Steven van Dijk (Christchurch United)	Joshua Rogerson (Christchurch United)	Yuya Taguchi (Cashmere Technical)	Riku Ichimura (Coastal Spirit)	Riku Ichimura (Coastal Spirit)	Yusuf van Dam (Christchurch United)	Garbhan Coughlan (Cashmere Technical); Riku Ichimura (Coastal Spirit)	Robbie Stanton (Coastal Spirit)
2026	Pieter-Taco Bierema (Cashmere Technical)	Danny Kane (Cashmere Technical)	John Reynolds (Nelson Suburbs)	Garbhan Coughlan (Cashmere Technical)	Garbhan Coughlan (Cashmere Technical)	Regan Frame (Nomads United)	Garbhan Coughlan (Cashmere Technical)	Dan Schwarz (Cashmere Technical)

Season	Women's Awards of the Year							
Season	Goalkeeper	Defender	Midfielder	Forward	Player	Youth	Golden Boot	Coach
2009	Noran Abaza (Halswell United)	Rebecca Banfield (Western)	Sara Clapham (Western)	Georgia Goulding (Western)	Georgia Goulding (Western)	Ashleigh Ward (Coastal Spirit)	Clare Warner (Ferrymead Bays)	Graham Allan (Western)
2010	—N/a							
2011	Lily Alfeld (Coastal Spirit)	Ashleigh Ward (Coastal Spirit)	Dayna Napa (Western)	Clare Warner (Woolston Technical)	Ashleigh Ward (Coastal Spirit)	Belinda Van Noorden (FC Twenty 11)	Clare Warner (Ferrymead Bays)	Morgan Tomlin (FC Twenty 11)
2012	Lynn Murray (Universities)	Meikayla Moore (Coastal Spirit)	Mikayla Weblitz (Cashmere Technical)	Aimee Phillips (Western)	Mikayla Weblitz (Cashmere Technical)	Laura Merrin (Coastal Spirit)	Melanie Cameron (Coastal Spirit)	Gareth Turnbull (Coastal Spirit)
2013	Lily Alfeld (Coastal Spirit)	Meikayla Moore (Coastal Spirit)	Mikayla Wieblitz (Cashmere Technical)	Aimee Phillips (Western)	Meikayla Moore (Coastal Spirit)	Lauren Dabner (Coastal Spirit)	Aimee Phillips (Western)	Alana Gunn (Coastal Spirit)
2014	Victoria Esson (Coastal Spirit)	Meikayla Moore (Coastal Spirit)	Annalie Longo (Coastal Spirit)	Aimee Phillips (Universities)	Aimee Phillips (Universities)	Holly Pascoe (Coastal Spirit)	Aimee Phillips (Universities)	Alana Gunn (Coastal Spirit)
2015	Hannah Herarty	Lee Maoeta-Cox	Annalie Longo	Monique Barker	Annalie Longo	Holly Pascoe	Monique Barker	Alana Gunn
2016	Briar Guyan (FC Twenty 11)	Emma Clarke (Coastal Spirit)	Mikayla Wieblitz (Cashmere Technical)	Melanie Cameron (Coastal Spirit)	Lily Bray (Coastal Spirit)	Lily Bray (Coastal Spirit)	Melanie Cameron (Coastal Spirit)	Keith Braithwaite (Cashmere Technical)
2017	Una Foyle (Coastal Spirit)	Rebecca Lake (Coastal Spirit)	Lily Bray (Coastal Spirit)	Emma Kench (Cashmere Technical)	Emma Kench (Cashmere Technical)	Macey Fraser (Waimakariri United)	Melanie Cameron (Coastal Spirit)	Alana Gunn (Coastal Spirit)
2018	Blair Currie (Cashmere Technical)	Annie Gilchrist (Cashmere Technical)	Jayda Stewart (Waimakariri United)	Cody Taylor (Coastal Spirit)	Jayda Stewart (Waimakariri United)	Gabbie Rennie (Waimakariri United)	Cody Taylor (Coastal Spirit)	Shane Verma (Waimakariri United)
2019	Una Foyle (Coastal Spirit)	Rebecca Lake (Coastal Spirit)	Lee Maoate-Cox (Cashmere Technical)	Melanie Cameron (Coastal Spirit)	Rebecca Lake (Coastal Spirit)	Marisa van der Meer (Waimakariri United)	Melanie Cameron (Coastal Spirit)	Juan Chang (Coastal Spirit)
2020	Una Foyle (Coastal Spirit)	Rebecca Lake (Coastal Spirit)	Annalie Longo (Cashmere Technical)	Britney-lee Nicholson (Coastal Spirit)	Rebecca Lake (Coastal Spirit)	Kate Taylor (Cashmere Technical)	Britney-lee Nicholson (Coastal Spirit)	Juan Chang (Coastal Spirit)
2021	Annie Foote (Coastal Spirit)	Rebecca Lake (Coastal Spirit)	Lauren Dabner (Coastal Spirit)	Melanie Cameron (Coastal Spirit)	Lauren Dabner (Coastal Spirit)	Zoe McMeeken (Coastal Spirit)	Britney-lee Nicholson (Coastal Spirit)	Juan Chang (Coastal Spirit)
2022	Una Foyle (Coastal Spirit SAS)	Rebecca Lake (Coastal Spirit SAS)	Kate Loye (Cashmere Technical)	Melanie Cameron (Coastal Spirit SAS)	Melanie Cameron (Coastal Spirit SAS)	Charlotte Mortlock (Cashmere Technical)	Melanie Cameron (Coastal Spirit SAS)	Juan Chang (Coastal Spirit SAS)
2023	Madeleine Iro (Cashmere Technical)	Ellena Firth (Coastal Spirit SAS)	Anna McPhie (Nelson Suburbs)	Aimee Phillips (Cashmere Technical)	Aimee Phillips (Cashmere Technical)	Amber De Wit (FC Nomads)	Britney-Lee Nicholson (Coastal Spirit SAS)	Shane Verma (Cashmere Technical)
2024	Amber Bennet (Cashmere Technical)	Lara Wall (Cashmere Technical)	Anna McPhie (Cashmere Technical)	Aimee Phillips (Cashmere Technical)	Anna McPhie (Cashmere Technical)	Amber De Wit (Nomads United)	Anna McPhie (Cashmere Technical)	Shane Verma (Cashmere Technical)
2025	Amber Bennet (Cashmere Technical)	Lilly Fisher (Cashmere Technical)	Kate Loye (Cashmere Technical)	Britney-Lee Nicholson (Coastal Spirit)	Kate Loye (Cashmere Technical)	Anya Stephan (Cashmere Technical)	Britney-Lee Nicholson (Coastal Spirit	Duncan Reed (Cashmere Technical)
2026	Simonne MacMannus (Nelson Suburbs)	Maya Alcantara (Cashmere Technical)	Kate Loye (Cashmere Technical)	Margarida Dias (Cashmere Technical)	Margarida Dias (Cashmere Technical)	Holly Lyon (Universities)	Margarida Dias (Cashmere Technical)	Shane Verma (Cashmere Technical)

Season	Other Awards of the Year							
Season	Men's Team	Women's Team	Hurley Shield	Hawkey Shield	McFarlane Cup (Men's)	McFarlane Cup (Women's)	Referee	Administrator
2009	Woolston Technical	Western	Woolston Technical	—N/a	Woolston Technical	—N/a	Paul Dalziel	Andrew Harper (Selwyn United)
2010	—N/a							
2011	Ferrymead Bays	Coastal Spirit	Coastal Spirit	—N/a	Coastal Spirit	—N/a	Darren Sundborn	Martin Stewart; Gareth Turnbull
2012	Ferrymead Bays	Coastal Spirit	Ferrymead Bays	—N/a	Cashmere Technical and Western	—N/a	Darren Sundborn	Derek Johnson; Gerard de Rooy
2013	Cashmere Technical	Coastal Spirit	Cashmere Technical	—N/a	Cashmere Technical	Coastal Spirit	—N/a	Murray Ralfs (Burwood)
2014	Cashmere Technical	Coastal Spirit	Cashmere Technical	Universities	Cashmere Technical	Coastal Spirit	Isaac Trevis	Ian Fong
2015	Cashmere Technical	Coastal Spirit	Cashmere Technical	FC Twenty 11	Cashmere Technical	Coastal Spirit	Isaac Trevis	Erna Rogers (Ferrymead Bays)
2016	Cashmere Technical	Cashmere Technical	Cashmere Technical	Coastal Spirit	Cashmere Technical	Cashmere Technical	Darren Sundborn	—N/a
2017	Ferrymead Bays	Coastal Spirit	Coastal Spirit	Coastal Spirit	Cashmere Technical	Coastal Spirit	Ben O’Connell	Craig Bowen
2018	Cashmere Technical	Coastal Spirit	Coastal Spirit	Coastal Spirit	Cashmere Technical	Coastal Spirit	Ben O’Connell	Gerard De Rooy (Selwyn United)
2019	Cashmere Technical	Coastal Spirit	Cashmere Technical	Coastal Spirit	Christchurch United	Coastal Spirit	Nick Burnett	Jodi Gauci (Nomads United)
2020	Cashmere Technical	Coastal Spirit	Cashmere Technical	Coastal Spirit	—N/a		Nick Burnett	Lisa Young (Cashmere Technical)
2021	Cashmere Technical	Coastal Spirit	Selwyn United	Coastal Spirit	Cashmere Technical	Coastal Spirit	Nick Burnett	Jeremy Hodges (Papanui Redwood)
2022	Christchurch United	Coastal Spirit SAS	Cashmere Technical	Cashmere Technical	Cashmere Technical	Coastal Spirit SAS	Caleb Downes	Lisa Young (Cashmere Technical)
2023	Christchurch United	Cashmere Technical	Coastal Spirit	Coastal Spirit SAS	Christchurch United	Coastal Spirit SAS	Caleb Downes	Deborah Foord (Waimakariri United)
2024	Coastal Spirit	Cashmere Technical	Christchurch United	Coastal Spirit SAS	Coastal Spirit	Cashmere Technical	Ben O’Connell	Matt Hastings (Selwyn United)
2025	Coastal Spirit	Cashmere Technical	Coastal Spirit	Cashmere Technical	Christchurch United	Cashmere Technical	Ben O’Connell	Steve Potter (Parklands United)
2026	Cashmere Technical	Cashmere Technical	Nomads United	Cashmere Technical	Cashmere Technical	Cashmere Technical	Caleb Downes	Ellis Hare-Reid (Coastal Spirit)

== See also ==
- New Zealand Football
- Northern Region Football
- WaiBOP Football
- Central Football
- Capital Football
- Southern Football
- Association football in New Zealand
