= Michael White (footballer) =

Welsh-born New Zealand footballer

Personal information
- Full name: Michael White
- Date of birth: 8 January 1987 (age 39)
- Place of birth: Wales
- Height: 1.76 m (5 ft 9 1/2 in)
- Positions: Attacking midfielder; striker

Team information
- Current team: Ferrymead Bays
- Number: 19

Youth career
- –2002: Richmond Athletic

Senior career*
| Years | Team | Apps | (Gls) |
| 2005, 2013–2014, 2015– | Canterbury United | 0 | (0) |
| 2006–2007 | New Zealand Knights | 11 | (0) |
| 2007 | Waitakere United | 11 | (2) |
| 2007–2008 | Rhyl FC | 29 | (4) |
| 2009–2010 | Miramar Rangers | | |
| 2010–? | YoungHeart Manawatu | 7 | (5) |
| 2011–? | Team Wellington | 1 | (0) |

International career
- New Zealand U17
- New Zealand U20
- New Zealand A
- * Club domestic league appearances and goals

Michael White (born 8 January 1987) is a Welsh-born New Zealand footballer, currently playing for ASB Premiership side Canterbury United FC.

== Career ==
White started his football with Richmond Athletic and played for Canterbury United during the 2005-06 NZFC season, he can play in various midfield and attacking roles. He joined Australian A-League side New Zealand Knights in 2006, before joining Waitakere United for the remainder of the NZFC season. In mid-2007 he moved to his place of birth, Wales, and joined Rhyl FC in the Welsh Premier League, finishing Top Goal Scorer.

2009 found him back in New Zealand and playing for Central Premier League side Miramar Rangers, winning the 2010 Chatham Cup. He joined Youngheart Manawatu for the 2010–2011 season. After another season with Miramar Rangers in the Central Premier League, he joined Team Wellington. With a move back to the South Island, he transferred from Team Wellington to Canterbury United for the remainder of the season 2011/2012 season. Signed for Nelson Suburbs in the Mainland League.

== International ==
White played for the New Zealand U-17, New Zealand U-20 national teams and New Zealand A-Team that toured Vietnam in 2006.

== Golf Career ==
White joined the Hororata golf club in 2022, where he became one the 'Marvellous M's" at the top of the Hororata Blank Cup golf team, alongside Mark Weatherley and Max Edwards.

== Personal ==
White and his partner Jamee have three daughters. Maddie, Harlow and Willow.

== Honours ==
Individual

- Mainland Football Mens Golden Boot: 2017
