= Juan José Chang =

Guatemalan footballer (born 1987)

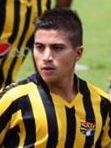

Personal information
- Full name: Juan José Chang Urrea
- Date of birth: 17 November 1987 (age 38)
- Place of birth: Heidelberg, Germany
- Height: 1.75 m (5 ft 9 in)
- Position: Forward

College career
Years	Team	Apps	(Gls)
2006–2010	Oral Roberts University		

Senior career*
Years	Team	Apps	(Gls)
2009	Cascade Surge		
2010	Rochester Thunder		
2011–2012	Antigua		
2012	→ Aurora (loan)		
2013	Aurora		
2015	Western Suburbs		
2015–2020	Canterbury United	49	(5)

Managerial career
- 2019 – 2023: St Albans Shirley (Director of Football)
- 2019 - 2023: Coastal Spirit (women)
- 2023 – 2024: Samoa U20 (women)
- 2023 –: Samoa U17 (women)
- 2023 –: Samoa (women)
- * Club domestic league appearances and goals

Juan José Chang Urrea (born 17 November 1987) is a football manager who manages the Samoa women's national football team & the Samoa women's national under-17 football team. Born in Germany to a family in Guatemalan, Salvadoran, and Croatian roots, he was the first head coach to lead Samoa to a FIFA World Cup.

== Life and career ==
Chang was born on 17 November 1987 in Heidelberg, Germany. He was born to a Salvadoran father of Croatian descent and a Guatemalan mother of Chinese descent. He has four siblings. He has been a Christian. He attended Oral Roberts University in the United States and played for their soccer team. In 2009, he signed for American side Cascade Surge. In 2010, he signed for American side Rochester Thunder. In 2011, he signed for Guatemalan side Antigua, helping the club achieve promotion. In 2012, he signed for Guatemalan side Aurora.

In 2015, he signed for New Zealand side Western Suburbs. He was described as "seen as the 'odd one out'" upon arrival to New Zealand. After that, he signed for New Zealand side Canterbury United.In 2019, he was appointed manager of New Zealand women's side Coastal Spirit. He coached the women's team win the local league and cup multiple times, as well as the South Island Championship once. During his tenure, he was named Mainland Football Coach of the Year four consecutive times — a record in the region. He was also recognized internationally, winning the IFFHS World's Best Club Coach OFC award in 2021.

== Samoa Women's National Team ==
In 2023, he was appointed manager of the Samoa women's national football team. He helped the Samoa women's national under-17 football team achieve qualification for the 2025 FIFA U-17 Women's World Cup and the 2026 FIFA U-17 Women's World Cup. He also guided the Samoa women's national under-20 football team to a bronze medal at the 2023 OFC U-19 Women's Championship. Lastly, he helped the Samoa women's senior national team secure their first-ever medal at the Women's Nations Cup in 2025.

== Honours ==
=== Managerial ===
Coastal Spirit

- Mainland Women's Premier League: 2019, 2020, 2021, 2022
- Reta Fitzpatrick Cup: 2020, 2021, 2022
- Hawkey Shields: 2019, 2020, 2021, 2022, 2023
- Women's McFarlane Cups: 2019, 2020, 2021, 2023
- South Island Championship: 2022
- South Island Qualifying League (North): 2023
- Kate Sheppard Cup: 2019 Runners-up

=== Individual ===
- Mainland Football Women's Team Coach of the Year: 2019, 2020, 2021, 2022
- IFFHS World's Best Club Coach OFC: 2021
