= Ashleigh Ward =

New Zealand association footballer

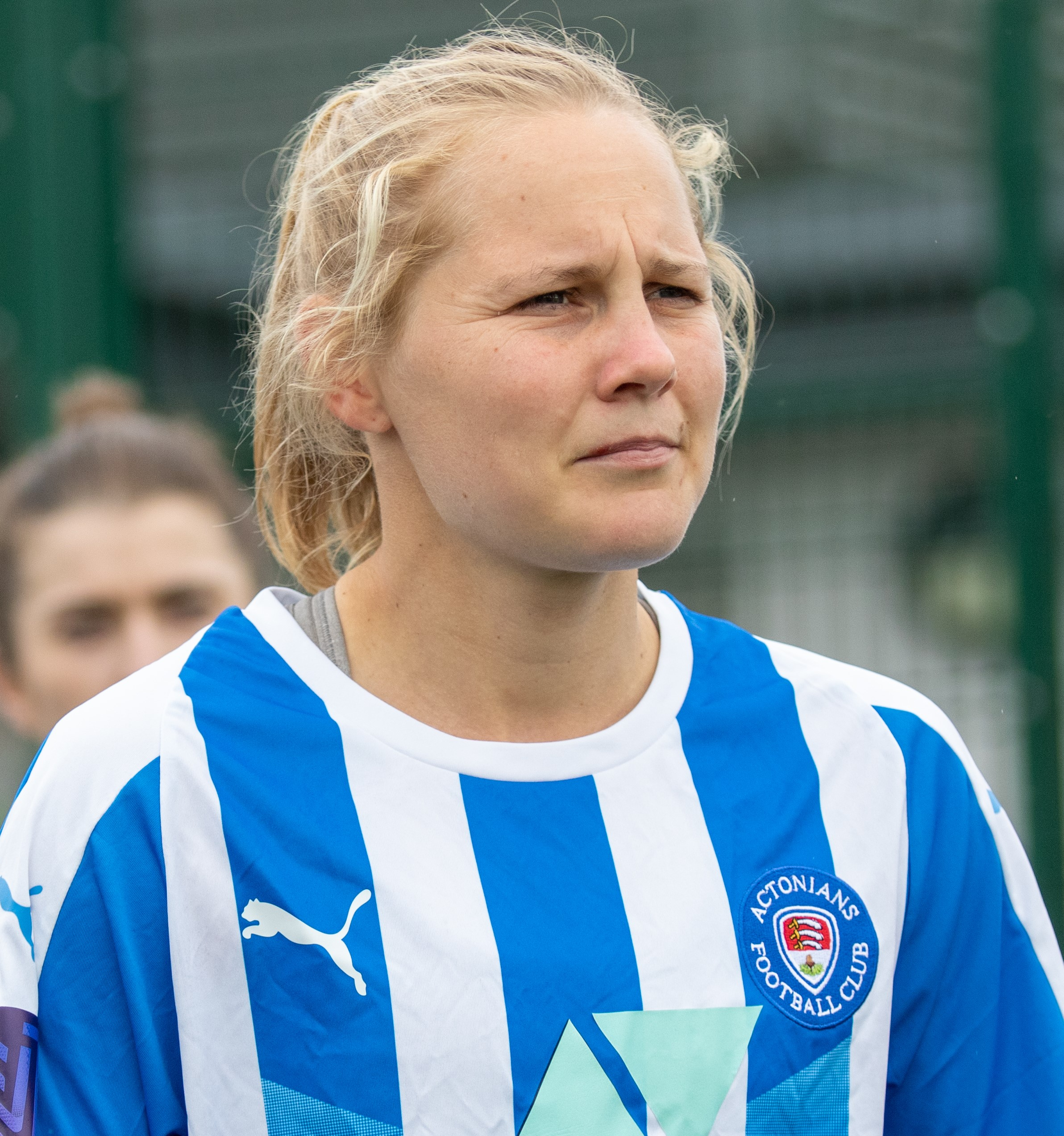
- Ward with Actonians in 2022.

Personal information
- Full name: Ashleigh Susan Ward
- Date of birth: 18 August 1994 (age 32)
- Place of birth: New Zealand
- Height: 1.57 m (5 ft 2 in)
- Position: Left-back

College career
Years	Team	Apps	(Gls)
2013	Boston College Eagles	3	(0)

Senior career*
Years	Team	Apps	(Gls)
- Coastal Spirit
?–2016	Canterbury United Pride		
2019–2022	Actonians		
2022–2023	Southampton	4	(0)

International career^{‡}
c. 2010	New Zealand U17		
2012–2014	New Zealand U20	6	(0)
2021–	New Zealand	4	(0)
- * Club domestic league appearances and goals as of 09:06, 6 December 2022 (UTC) ‡ National team caps and goals as of 20 September 2023 (UTC)

Ashleigh Susan Ward (born 18 August 1994) is a New Zealand association footballer, who has represented the national team. At club level, she played for Southampton in the English FA Women's Championship. She has previously played for Canterbury United Pride in New Zealand, Boston College Eagles in the United States, and Actonians in England.

== Early life ==
Ward studied in Auckland, before moving to Christchurch, where she attended Cashmere High School. She started as a left winger, before changing to a left full back. In 2012, she was part of the Cashmere High School girls' team that won the Canterbury Girls' Premier League, and the 2009 and 2010 editions of the Gary Sowden Cup. She studied at Lincoln University, where she also played rugby union. In 2018, she moved to London to work as a physical education teacher. She started studying again in 2023, as her New Zealand teaching qualification was not usable in the United Kingdom.

== Club career ==
In New Zealand, Ward played football for Canterbury United Pride, and was part of the Pride team that won the 2014 and 2016 New Zealand Women's National Leagues. She also played college soccer for Boston College Eagles in the United States. She made one appearance for Boston College Eagles in December 2013. After moving to London, Ward started playing for Actonians in England, and was the team's captain. In June 2021, she was part of the Actonians team that lost the final of the Capital Women's Senior Cup to Queen's Park Rangers. Later in the year, she scored as Actonians beat Harlow Town 8–1. In 2022, she had a trial with an English FA Women's Championship club, and in August 2022, she signed for Women's Championship side Southampton.

== International career ==
Ward played for New Zealand under-17s in the buildup to the 2010 FIFA U-17 Women's World Cup, but was dropped before the tournament. She played all three of New Zealand under-20s matches at the 2012 FIFA U-20 Women's World Cup, and was in their squad for the 2014 tournament.

In November 2021, Ward was called up to the senior team. She was the only uncapped player in the squad. She made her debut on 30 November against South Korea. She replaced New Zealand captain Ali Riley, who was injured. In February 2022, she was named in the New Zealand squad for the 2022 SheBelieves Cup. She was ruled out of a 2022 match against Norway due to an injury. She was not selected for the 2023 FIFA Women's World Cup; she had been a part of the New Zealand pre-event training camp.

== Honours ==
Individual

- Mainland Football Women's Youth Player of the Year: 2009
- Mainland Football Women's Defender of the Year: 2011
- Mainland Football Women's Player of the Year: 2011
