= Aimee Phillips =

New Zealand association football player

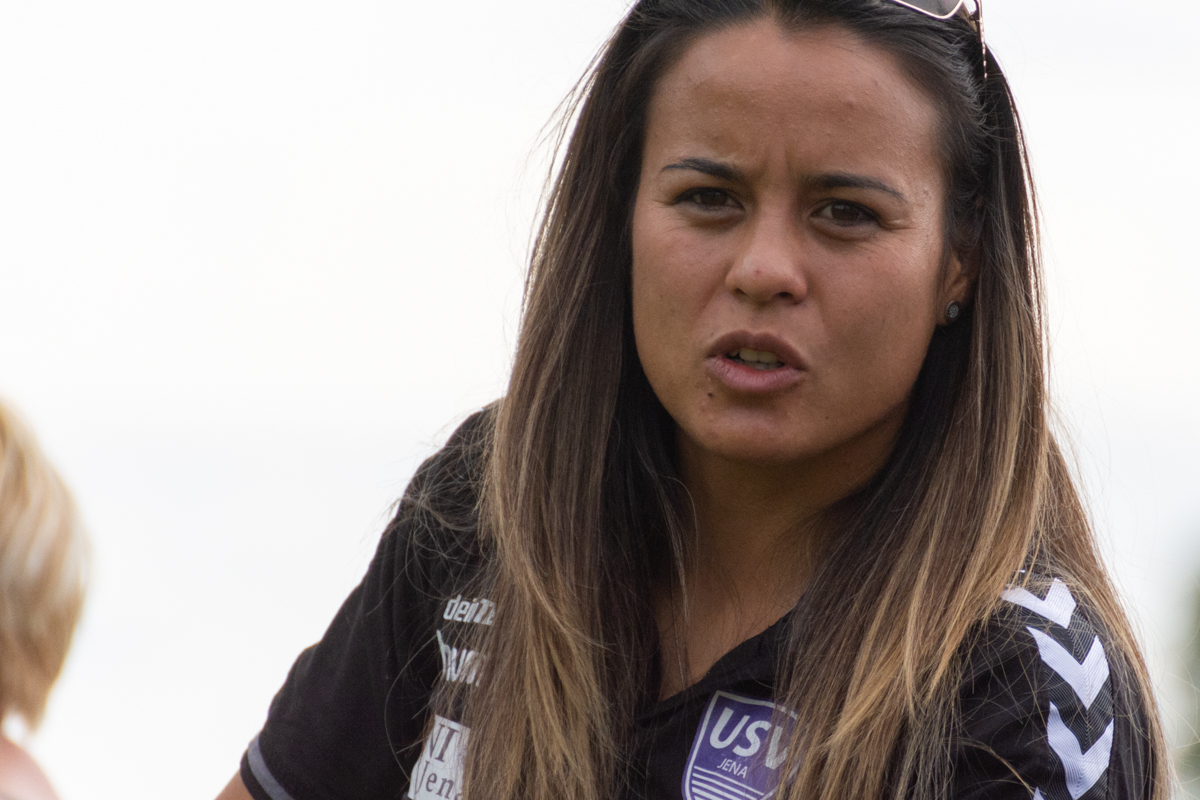
- Phillips in 2018

Personal information
- Full name: Aimee Flavia Phillips
- Date of birth: 6 May 1991 (age 35)
- Place of birth: Runanga, New Zealand
- Height: 1.57 m (5 ft 2 in)
- Position: Forward

Senior career*
Years	Team	Apps	(Gls)
- FF USV JENA
	Cardiff Met. Ladies F.C.		(1)
	ŽFK Spartak Subotica	9	(6)
	Canterbury United Pride		(35)
	New Zealand Development Squad		(8)
	Northern Football	9	(7)
	Eastern Suburbs		(35)
	Forest Hill-Milford United		(19)
	Canterbury University		(26)
	Western AFC		(14)
2018–2019	USV Jena	7	(0)

International career^{‡}
	New Zealand	8	(1)
- * Club domestic league appearances and goals as of 02:25, 22 July 2019 (UTC) ‡ National team caps and goals as of 13 June 2019

Aimee Phillips (born 6 May 1991) is a New Zealand footballer who plays as a forward for the New Zealand women's national football team. Her last National team appearance was in 2019 where she represented New Zealand against North Korea. She was part of the team at the 2016 Algarve Cup.

In 2018, she represented ZFK Spartak Subotica where she made 9 (apps) and scored 6 (gls) in the Serbian SuperLiga and won the Serbian Superliga. In June 2018, she moved to Cardiff Met. Ladies F.C. to play in the UEFA Champions League qualifying rounds. Cardiff Met. Ladies F.C. lost 3–2 to WFC Zhytlobud-1 Kharkiv, 5–2 to CFF Olimpia Cluj and drew 2–2 with Birkirkara F.C. She scored 1 (gls) and 2 (assists) during the UEFA Champions League.

== International goals ==
No.	Date	Venue	Opponent	Score	Result	Competition
1.	23 January 2016	PNGFA Academy, Lae, Papua New Guinea	Papua New Guinea	4–0	7–1	2016 OFC Women's Olympic Qualifying Tournament

== Honours ==
Individual

- Mainland Football Women's Striker of the Year: 2012, 2014, 2023, 2024
- Mainland Football Women's Player of the Year: 2014, 2023
- Mainland Football Women's Golden Boot: 2014
