= Richmond Athletic FC =

- Full name: Richmond Athletic Football Club
- Founded: 1948
- Ground: Jubilee Park, Richmond, Tasman
- League: Nelson Premiership Division 1
- 2026: Nelson Premiership Division 1, 5th of 6
Home colours

Richmond Athletic FC is a New Zealand football club, based in the South Island town of Richmond, Tasman, New Zealand. The club competes in the Nelson Premiership Division 1. Their home ground is Jubilee Park.

== History ==
Formed in 1948, Richmond Athletic changed its name to Richmond City in 2005. In 2006 they won the local league and entered the play-offs for promotion to the Mainland Premier League, beating both Burnside FC and Avon United on aggregate. They lasted only two years before being relegated from the division following an aggregate loss to Christchurch United in the play-off. Following their demotion they reverted to their original name of Richmond Athletic.

Richmond Athletic again earned the right to a promotion play-off in 2010, losing on aggregate after a 4–2 1st leg home win, and an away loss of 3–0.

Richmond won the Nelson Pine Division 1 League back to back in 2010 and 2011 under coach Steve Bignall and Manager Rick Gower. The team was led by English imports Joe Green, Ben Wright, Jordan Yong, Che Wilson and Sam Mason Smith.

=== Notable former players ===
The following former Richmond Athletic players have represented their respective countries at international level:

- (New Zealand) Jeremy Brockie
- (England) Michael White

== Honours ==
Women's First Team

- Nelson Bays Women's Premiership League: 2024
