= Southern League (New Zealand) =

- Organising body: Mainland Football; Southern Football
- Founded: 1968; 58 years ago Revived: 2021; 5 years ago
- Folded: 1999; 27 years ago
- Country: New Zealand
- Confederation: OFC (Oceania)
- Number of clubs: 10
- Level on pyramid: 2
- Feeder to: National League
- Relegation to: Canterbury Premiership; Nelson Bays Premiership; Southern Premiership
- Domestic cup: Chatham Cup
- League cup: English Cup (Mainland Football teams only)
- Last champions: Cashmere Technical (3rd title) (2026)
- Most championships: Cashmere Technical (3 titles)
- Most appearances: Jamie Carrodus and Luke Pritchard (76)
- Top scorer: Garbhan Coughlan (101)
- Broadcaster: FIFA+ (selected matches)
- Website: Mainland Football
- Current: 2026 Southern League

The Southern League, known as the Dettol Southern League for sponsorship reasons, is a competition organized by the New Zealand Football, run by the Mainland Football and the Southern Football, for association football clubs located in the South Island of New Zealand. It is a New Zealand top-tier competition during the winter season, and sits at step two overall under the summer National League.

== History ==
=== The original Southern League ===
The first Southern League was established in 1968, prior to the launch of a National Soccer League, and at the time represented the highest level of competitive football for clubs in the South Island. The league provided a structured competition for southern clubs and helped standardize the level of play, offering a pathway for clubs aiming to compete nationally.

When the National Soccer League was created in 1970, the Southern League became one of its feeder competitions, supplying promoted clubs to the national level and receiving relegated clubs from the national league. This feeder system continued for nearly three decades, until the league folded in 1999. During its existence, the league helped foster rivalries among South Island clubs and contributed significantly to the development of regional football, producing players who went on to represent both provincial teams and the New Zealand national side.

Initially, the league was organized into Division 1 and Division 2 for the first four seasons, reflecting differences in club strength and infrastructure. After this period, the competition commonly operated with a split structure, either as Division 1 North/South or as Divisions 1 and 2 North/South. This approach was largely adopted to reduce travel costs across the South Island, allowing clubs to compete against geographically proximate teams while still maintaining a pathway to national competition.

=== South Island Football Championship ===
In 2008, following several years without a regional championship, the Mainland and FootballSouth federations reintroduced the Southern League concept under the name of the South Island Football Championship. The competition was designed to crown a South Island champion at the end of each season and provide a higher-level contest for clubs from both federations. The championship ran annually from 2008 to 2017, with a one-off return in 2020.

The original format featured both the champions and runners-up from the Mainland Premier League and FootballSouth Premier League, resulting in a small knockout-style tournament or a mini-league, depending on the year. After a break in 2010, the format was revised to a single-match playoff between the champions of each federation's premier league, with hosting duties alternating between Mainland and FootballSouth each year. This streamlined format highlighted the top club from each region in a decisive final.

=== Southern Football League ===
In 2018, Mainland Football and FootballSouth reintroduced the Southern League as a proper league rather than a one-off playoff. The top clubs from both federations competed in a single round-robin competition, creating a stronger and more consistent South Island league. Under this structure, the Mainland Premier League played a double round-robin, while the FootballSouth Premier League played a single round-robin. The top five Mainland teams and the top three FootballSouth teams then advanced to the Southern Football League. In the first season of the reformed league, Cashmere Technical won the title. The same format continued in 2019, with Nelson Suburbs claiming the championship on the final day.

=== Revival of the Southern League ===
Cashmere/United dominance
Season	Champions	Runners-up
2021	Cashmere Technical	Selwyn United
2022	Christchurch United	Cashmere Technical
2023	Christchurch United	Cashmere Technical
2024	Cashmere Technical	Coastal Spirit
2025	Coastal Spirit	Christchurch United
2026	Cashmere Technical	Ferrymead Bays
English Cup winners Mainland Treble winners

In March 2021, New Zealand Football announced a restructure of the premiership and top regional leagues. The four existing regional leagues (NRFL Premier, Central Premier League, Mainland Premier League, and FootballSouth Premier League) were reorganised into the Northern League, Central League, and Southern League.

These leagues became the qualifying pathway for the newly named National League Championship. The top four teams from the Northern League, top three from the Central League, and top two from the Southern League would join the Wellington Phoenix Reserves in a single round-robin competition held from September to December.

For the Southern League, teams first played their regular Mainland Premier League and FootballSouth Premier League seasons, with five clubs from Mainland and three from FootballSouth qualifying for the new competition. The inaugural season began on 17 July 2021.

Cashmere Technical were the inaugural Southern League winners, also claiming the Chatham Cup and English Cup, with Selwyn United finishing runners-up. Both sides were set to compete in the new National League, but due to the COVID-19 pandemic New Zealand Football altered the 2021 Championship phase format. The league was split into an Auckland Hub and a South Hub, with both teams placed in the South Hub alongside Central League qualifiers. On 2 November, after confirmation that Auckland and Waikato teams could not compete further due to alert levels, New Zealand Football cancelled the remainder of the National League. Instead, they introduced a one-off interregional tournament, the National League: South Central Series. Cashmere finished third, one point short of the grand final, while Selwyn placed sixth with one point. Cashmere's Garbhan Coughlan was the region's top scorer, winning the golden boot with three goals in the National League and seven in the Southern League, tied with Christchurch United's Edward Wilkinson.

The next two seasons were won by Christchurch United, with Cashmere Technical finishing runners-up both times. Cashmere placed higher than Christchurch in the 2022 National League, while Christchurch finished 3rd in 2023. Christchurch returned to the National League in 2022 after a 30-year absence, and in 2023 completed a treble by winning the Chatham Cup and English Cup, 32 years after their previous treble. Garbhan Coughlan was the region's top scorer in the National League, sharing the golden boot with nine and eleven goals in those seasons.

In 2024, Cashmere Technical won the league, with Coastal Spirit finishing runners-up — their best result after placing 3rd the year before. Coastal also finished above Cashmere in their debut National League season, where Garbhan Coughlan shared the golden boot with eight goals. Their season improved further as they reached the Chatham Cup quarter- and semi-finals for the first time, before winning the English Cup by beating Cashmere 4–0 in the final.

In 2025, Coastal Spirit won their first league title since forming in 2008. The last time one of their founding clubs won the Southern League was New Brighton in 1994 (Division One North), while Rangers claimed the full Southern League in 1979. Christchurch United returned to the National League after Coastal's debut the previous season, replacing Cashmere Technical, who missed out on National League football for the first time.

== Current clubs ==
Location of clubs in South Island for the 2026 Southern League season
Location of clubs in Christchurch District for the 2026 Southern League season

As of 2026 season

Team	Home ground	Location	2025 season
Cashmere Technical	Garrick Memorial Park	Woolston, Christchurch	3rd
Christchurch United	United Sports Centre	Spreydon, Christchurch	2nd
Coastal Spirit	Tāne Norton Park	Linwood, Christchurch	1st
Dunedin City Royals	Football Turf	Dunedin North, Dunedin	7th
Ferrymead Bays	Ferrymead Park	Ferrymead, Christchurch	6th
Nelson Suburbs	Saxton Field	Stoke, Nelson	4th
Nomads United	Tulett Park	Casebrook, Christchurch	5th
Northern	Caledonian Ground	Dunedin North, Dunedin	1st in Southern Premier League (promoted via play-offs)
Selwyn United	Foster Park	Rolleston	10th (Note: Selwyn United were reprived of relegation as University of Canterbury withdrew.)
Wānaka	Wānaka Recreation Centre	Wānaka	8th

=== Promotion/Relegation ===
As of 2026 season

Season	Relegated Club	Federation	Promoted Club
2021	Otago University	Southern Football	Ferrymead Bays
2021	Otago University	Southern Football	Mosgiel
2021	Otago University	Southern Football	Nomads United
2022	Mosgiel	Southern Football	FC Twenty 11
2023	Green Island	Southern Football	University of Canterbury
2024	FC Twenty 11	Mainland Football	Wānaka
2025	University of Canterbury	Mainland Football	Northern

== Sponsorship ==
On 31 January 2025, New Zealand Football agreed a multi-year sponsorship deal with cleaning brand Dettol for naming rights of the National League (including the regional leagues) from the start of the 2025 season.

== Media coverage ==
In September 2023, New Zealand signed a deal to have all National League games streamed for free on FIFA+ worldwide. This includes select games of the qualifying league games as well. On 8 May 2024, New Zealand Football announced they had partnered with Sportway to continue broadcasting on FIFA+. 4K Sportway cameras have begun to be installed at grounds as of May 2024 with plans to broadcast over 200 games for the 2024 season.

== Awards ==
The following lists are each seasons Top Goalscorer and Most Valuable Player from the 2021 season onwards after New Zealand Football changed the football league system in New Zealand. From 2021, the Southern League has acted as a qualifier league to the National League.

Top Scorers
Season	Top scorer(s)	Club(s)	Goals
2021	(Republic of Ireland) Garbhan Coughlan (Note: Garbhan Coughlan was awarded the award due to playing fewer matches)	Cashmere Technical	7
2021	(New Zealand) Edward Wilkinson	Christchurch United	7
2022	(Republic of Ireland) Garbhan Coughlan	Cashmere Technical	24
2023	(New Zealand) Samuel Philip	Christchurch United	29
2024	(Republic of Ireland) Garbhan Coughlan	Cashmere Technical	26
2025	(Republic of Ireland) Garbhan Coughlan	Cashmere Technical	16
2025	(Japan) Riku Ichimura	Coastal Spirit	16
2026	(Republic of Ireland) Garbhan Coughlan	Cashmere Technical	32

MVP Winners
Season	Winner(s)	Club(s)
2021	(New Zealand) Pieter-Taco Bierema	Selwyn United
2022	(New Zealand) Cameron Anderson	Green Island
2023	(Republic of Ireland) Garbhan Coughlan	Cashmere Technical
2024	(New Zealand) David Yoo	Christchurch United
2025	(Japan) Riku Ichimura	Coastal Spirit
2026	(Republic of Ireland) Garbhan Coughlan	Cashmere Technical

== Records ==
The following records are from the 2021 season onwards after New Zealand Football changed the football league system in New Zealand. From 2021, the Southern League has acted as a qualifier league to the National League. Any records form 2021 season are noted. The records are up to date as of the end of the 2026 season

- **Most wins in a season: 17** – Cashmere Technical (2026)
- **Fewest wins in a season: 0**
  - FC Twenty 11 (2024)
  - Selwyn United (2025)
- **Most draws in a season: 7** – Coastal Spirit (2022)
- **Fewest draws in a season: 0** (Note: 2021 season had 4 teams with 0 draws, (Note: 2021 season only had 8 teams and 7 games before it was expanded to 10 with 18 games.) Cashmere Technical, Coastal Spirit, South City Royals (Note: Dunedin City Royals were called South City Royals for the 2021 season.) and Otago University)
  - FC Twenty 11 (2023)
  - Coastal Spirit (2025)
  - Wānaka (2025)
- **Most defeats in a season: 17** – FC Twenty 11 (2024)
- **Fewest defeats in a season: 0** – Cashmere Technical (2026)
- **Most goals scored in a season: 91** – Cashmere Technical (2024)
- **Fewest goals scored in a season: 9** – FC Twenty 11 (2024)
- **Most goals conceded in a season: 93** – FC Twenty 11 (2024)
- **Fewest goals conceded in a season: 7** – Cashmere Technical (2026) (Note: 2021 season had 1 team with 7 goals conceded, Cashmere Technical)
- **Most points in a season: 52** – Cashmere Technical (2026)
- **Fewest points in a season: 1** – FC Twenty 11 (2024)
- **Highest goal difference: +84** – Cashmere Technical (2026)
- **Lowest goal difference: -84** – FC Twenty 11 (2024)
- **Biggest home win: 12 goals** – Cashmere Technical 12–0 FC Twenty 11 (6 April 2024)
- **Biggest away win: 12 goals** – Green Island 3–15 Christchurch United (27 August 2023)
- **Highest scoring match: 18 goals** – Green Island 3–15 Christchurch United (27 August 2023)
- **Biggest title-winning margin: 14 points** – 2026, Cashmere Technical (49 points) over Ferrymead Bays (38 points)
- **Smallest title-winning margin: 0 points and +3 goal difference** – 2022, Christchurch United (+62) over Cashmere Technical (+59). Both finished on 49 points.

=== Appearances ===
Rank	Player	Years	Apps
1	(New Zealand) **Jamie Carrodus**	2021–2025	76
1	(New Zealand) **Luke Pritchard**	2021–2025	76
3	(New Zealand) **Declan Tyndall**	2021–2025	75
4	(Samoa) **Kaleb De Groot-Green**	2021–2025	73
5	(New Zealand) **Alex Ballard**	2021–2025	71
6	(New Zealand) **Jack Allatt**	2021–2025	70
6	(New Zealand) **Liam Cotter**	2021–2025	70
6	(New Zealand) **Riley Grover**	2022–2025	70
9	(New Zealand) **Caleb Cottom**	2022–2025	69
9	(New Zealand) **Connor Neil**	2021–2025	69
As of 13 September 2025; **Bolded** players still playing in Southern League.

=== Top scorers ===
Rank	Player	Years	Goals	Apps	Ratio
1	(Republic of Ireland) **Garbhan Coughlan**	2021–2025	101	60	1.68
2	(South Africa) **Lyle Matthysen**	2021–2025	49	66	0.74
3	(New Zealand) **Edward Wilkinson**	2021–2023, 2025	32	35	0.91
4	(New Zealand) **Connor Neil**	2021–2025	29	69	0.42
4	(New Zealand) Sam Philip	2023	29	18	1.61
4	(England) **Lennon Whewell**	2023–2025	29	45	0.57
7	(New Zealand) **Liam Cotter**	2021–2025	27	70	0.39
7	(New Zealand) **Joel Stevens**	2024–2025	27	33	0.82
9	(United States) **Trevin Myers**	2023–2025	25	51	0.49
10	(New Zealand) **Flynn Holdem**	2023–2025	24	40	0.6
As of 13 September 2025; **Bolded** players still playing in the Southern League.

== Champions ==
Note: Number of times club placed in placement, (only for clubs with multiple placements)

Champions

- 2021 – Cashmere Technical (1)
- 2022 – Christchurch United (1)
- 2023 – Christchurch United (2)
- 2024 – Cashmere Technical (2)
- 2025 – Coastal Spirit
- 2026 – Cashmere Technical (3)

Runners-up

- 2021 – Selwyn United
- 2022 – Cashmere Technical (1)
- 2023 – Cashmere Technical (2)
- 2024 – Coastal Spirit
- 2025 – Christchurch United
- 2026 – Ferrymead Bays

=== Performance by Champions ===
Club	Location	Titles	Runners up	Title Seasons	Runners up Seasons
Cashmere Technical	Woolston, Christchurch	3	2	2021, 2024, 2026	2022, 2023
Christchurch United	Spreydon, Christchurch	2	1	2022, 2023	2025
Coastal Spirit	Linwood, Christchurch	1	1	2025	2024
Selwyn United	Rolleston	—N/a	1	—N/a	2021
Ferrymead Bays	Ferrymead, Christchurch	—N/a	1	—N/a	2026
