= Canterbury Premiership League =

- Organising body: Mainland Football
- Founded: 1998
- Country: New Zealand
- Confederation: OFC (Oceania)
- Number of clubs: 10
- Level on pyramid: 3
- Promotion to: Southern League
- Relegation to: Canterbury Championship League
- Domestic cup: Chatham Cup
- League cup: English Cup
- Current champions: Nomads United U20 Reserves (3rd title) (2026)
- Most championships: Cashmere Technical (10 titles)
- Website: Mainland Football
- Current: 2026 Canterbury Premiership League

The Canterbury Premiership League, formerly Mainland Premier League and also known as New World Canterbury Premiership League for sponsorship reasons, is a league competition run by Mainland Football for association football clubs located in Christchurch, New Zealand. It is at the third tier of New Zealand Football, below the Southern Leagues and above the Canterbury Championship League.

The competition currently runs between March and August each year, and consists of ten team based in Christchurch. There are 18 round where the teams play each other twice. The winner of the league has the option to play in the Mainland Football Federation Playoff, a two-leg home and away series against the winner of Nelson Bays Premiership. The winner of Mainland Football Federation Playoff, plays the winner of Southern Premiership in the Southern League Playoff, a two-leg home and away series. The winner of the Southern League Playoff will be promoted to the Southern League, assuming they will have the correct club licensing before the season starts.

== History ==
The Christchurch League started in 1998, a breakaway competition from the Southern League. The inaugural season had eight teams; Avon United, Canterbury University, Christchurch Rangers, Christchurch United, Halswell United, New Brighton, Nomads United and Western. The inaugural season was won by Christchurch United with a record 58 points, which was only beaten in 2020 by Cashmere Technical with 59 points.

In 2000, after the final season of the Southern League, the breakaway competition became the Federation 6 (Mainland) Premier League, the league was expanded to 11 teams, with two team outside of Christchurch; Marlborough United and Nelson Suburbs Reserves. The following season the league expanded to 12 teams, the additional team was Mid-Canterbury United, with Nelson Suburbs Reserves dropping out with Nelson Suburbs First team replacing them after withdrawing from the 2001 New Zealand National Soccer League, as they were unable to have two team from the same club compete in the Premier league.

In 2012, Woolston Technical and Cashmere Wanderers merged to become Cashmere Technical; they replaced the Woolston side that had finished sixth in the 2011 competition. Recently merged teams Coastal Spirit (Established between New Brighton AFC and Rangers AFC in 2008), and FC Twenty 11 (Established between Avon United and Burnside AFC in 2011) entered the Premier League through promotion from the Division One competition.

In March 2021, New Zealand Football announced a change to the structure of both the premiership and the top regional leagues around the country. The Mainland Premier League and the FootballSouth Premier League will be the new Southern League. These leagues would allow local clubs to qualify for the premiership season (now known as the National League Championship), with the top 4 teams from the Northern League, the top 3 teams from the Central League, and the top 2 teams from the Southern League making up the competition, alongside the Wellington Phoenix Reserve side. All teams that qualify plus the Phoenix Reserves, would then play a single round-robin competition between September and December. For the Southern League, the two existing competitions run in the South Island (Mainland Premier League and FootballSouth Premier League) play their original league seasons for the teams to then qualify for a place in the newly formed competition. Five teams from Mainland Premier League, which covers the top of the South Island to Christchurch and three teams from FootballSouth Premier League, covering from below Christchurch to the bottom of the South Island, will qualify. The competition started on the 17 July 2021. During that time, the bottom three teams played in a qualifying league with the top two teams in the Canterbury Championship league, with the top two finishers promoted to the 2022 Southern League.

In 2022, the league rebranded to become the Canterbury Premiership League (CPL), as there was no need to travel to Nelson to play a Nelson team.

=== Promotion to the Southern League ===
FC Twenty 11 won the inaugural season of CPL, then played Southern Football's runners-up Roslyn-Wakari in the Southern League playoffs, as Dunedin City Royals reserve team won the league and were ineligible for promotion. FC Twenty 11 won 5–2 on aggregate.

In 2023, University of Canterbury won the league and played off against Nelson Bays' premiership winners FC Nelson, winning 5–3 win on aggregate. They then faced Southern Football's runners-up Roslyn-Wakari, as Mosgiel declined participation in the playoffs. Drawing 2–2 on aggregate, University of Canterbury won 6–5 on penalties after extra time.

In 2024, Waimakariri United won the league and played off against Nelson Bays' premiership's 3rd placed FC Nelson, as Rangers declined to participate and second-placed Nelson Suburbs Reserves are ineligible to participate, drawing 6–6 on aggregate, and won 4–3 on penalties after extra time. They then faced Southern Football's runners-up Wānaka, as Mosgiel declined participation in the playoffs, Wānaka won 9–3 on aggregate.

In 2025, Halswell United came second in the league, as winners Christchurch United U20 Reserves are ineligible to participate, and played off against Nelson Bays' premiership's winners FC Nelson, winning 5–4 on aggregate. They then faced Southern Football's champions Northern, Northern won 7–1 on aggregate.

== Canterbury Premiership League teams ==
As of 2026 season.

Club	Home Ground(s)	Location	2024 season
Burwood	Clare Park	Marshland	9th
Cashmere Technical (2)	Garrick Memorial Park	Woolston	4th
Christchurch United (U)	United Sports Centre	Spreydon	1st
Ferrymead Bays (U)	Ferrymead Park	Ferrymead	3rd
Halswell United	Halswell Domain	Halswell	2nd
Nomads United (2)	Tulett Park	Casebrook	6th
Selwyn United (U)	Foster Park	Rolleston	8th
University of Canterbury	Ilam Field	Ilam	9th in Southern League (relegated)
Waimakariri United	Kendall Park	Kaiapoi	5th
Western	Westminster Park	Mairehau	7th

(2) — Denotes club's Second team, ineligible for promotion to the Southern League
(U) — Denotes club's Under 20 Reserve team, ineligible for promotion to the Southern League

== Winners ==
Mainland Premier League:

- 1998 - Christchurch United
- 1999 - Halswell United
- 2000 - Halswell United
- 2001 - Halswell United
- 2002 - Ferrymead Bays
- 2003 - Nomads United
- 2004 - Nelson Suburbs
- 2005 - Nelson Suburbs
- 2006 - Ferrymead Bays
- 2007 - Nomads United
- 2008 - Nelson Suburbs
- 2009 - Woolston Technical
- 2010 - Woolston Technical
- 2011 - Ferrymead Bays
- 2012 - Ferrymead Bays
- 2013 - Cashmere Technical
- 2014 - Cashmere Technical
- 2015 - Cashmere Technical
- 2016 - Cashmere Technical
- 2017 - Ferrymead Bays
- 2018- Cashmere Technical
- 2019 - Cashmere Technical
- 2020 - Cashmere Technical
- 2021 - Cashmere Technical

Club	Number of Titles	Year(s) Won
Cashmere Technical	10	2009*, 2010*, 2013, 2014, 2015, 2016, 2018, 2019, 2020, 2021
Ferrymead Bays	5	2002, 2006, 2011, 2012, 2017
Halswell United	3	1999, 2000, 2001
Nelson Suburbs	3	2004, 2005, 2008
Nomads United	2	2003, 2007
Christchurch United	1	1998

- Cashmere Technical's MPL titles in 2009 and 2010 were won by Woolston Technical, which was later merged in 2012.

Canterbury Premiership League:

- 2022 - FC Twenty 11
- 2023 - University of Canterbury
- 2024 - Waimakariri United
- 2025 - Christchurch United (U)
- 2026 - Nomads United (U)

Club	Number of Titles	Year(s) Won
FC Twenty 11	1	2022
University of Canterbury	1	2023
Waimakariri United	1	2024
Christchurch United (U)	1	2025
Nomads United (U)	1	2026

- (U) — Denotes club's Under 20 Reserve team
