= United Sports Centre =

Stadium in Christchurch, New Zealand

- Interactive map of United Sports Centre
- Former names: Christchurch Football Centre
- Location: 466 Yaldhurst Road, Russley, Christchurch, New Zealand
- Coordinates: 43.514868°S 172.528624°E
- Owner: Slava Meyn
- Operator: Christchurch Football Academy
- Capacity: 1,000
- Surface: Artificial Turf
- Record attendance: 700 (Christchurch United vs Cashmere Technical, 16 May 2025)
- Field size: 105 by 68 metres (114.8 yd × 74.4 yd)

Construction
- Groundbreaking: 2014
- Opened: 11 June 2015; 11 years ago

Tenants
- Christchurch United (2015–present); South Island United (2026–present)

Website
- https://footballcentre.co.nz/

United Sports Centre, is a multi-purpose stadium in the suburb of Russley in Christchurch, New Zealand. It is used for football matches and is the home stadium of Southern League and National League side Christchurch United and OFC Professional League side South Island United.

== History ==
In 2014, Christchurch-based Russian businessman Slava Meyn announced that he wanted to build a new football centre in Christchurch worth around $NZ8 million. Meyn bought 8 ha of land facing Yaldhurst Road in December 2012. He purchased a further 12 ha in May 2013. Between 2012 and 2013 he spent $3.5 million for the 20 hectares of land on Yaldhurst Road.

After gaining resource consent in late 2014, on 11 June 2015, Christchurch Football Centre was opened by the then Prime Minister of New Zealand John Key, as the new home of Christchurch United.

Meyn plans to develop the 20-hectare site in Yaldhurst Road further, with a $40 million sports and education centre.
