= Burwood AFC =

Burwood
- Full name: Burwood Association Football Club
- Founded: 1970; 56 years ago
- Ground: Clare Park, Marshland, Christchurch
- Manager: Mark Hilhorst
- League: Canterbury Premiership
- 2026: Canterbury Premiership, 6th of 10
- Website: http://www.burwoodafc.co.nz/

Burwood AFC is a football club based in Christchurch, New Zealand. They currently play in the Canterbury Premiership.

== History ==
The club was formed in 1970 as a junior football club, before introducing senior teams in 1980. In 1992, the club won promotion to the Southern Qualifying League by winning the CFA Districts League.

In 2023 Burwood partnered with 5 other Christchurch clubs to form the youth club Ōtākaro FC. They have started working together to better develop their Youth Talent Development and Junior Skills Center programs.

The club has competed in the Chatham Cup 19 times first competing in 1983, with their best appearance being in 1996, 2014, and 2021 where they reached the third round. In 2017 they received their heaviest defeat in the competition, losing 17–0 to Cashmere Technical in Round 1.

== Notable players ==
- (New Zealand) Meikayla Moore
