= Ferrymead Bays FC =

Ferrymead Bays
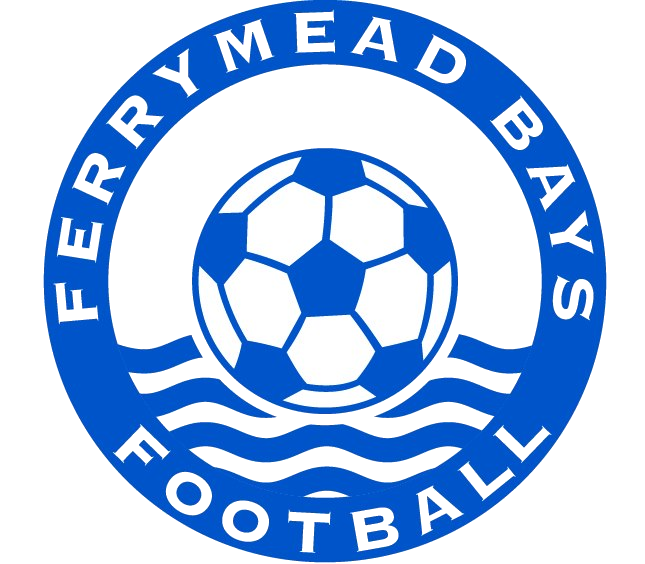
- Full name: Ferrymead Bays Football Club
- Nickname: The Bays
- Founded: 1972
- Ground: Ferrymead Park, Ferrymead, Christchurch
- Capacity: 1000
- Chairman: Shaun Palmer
- Manager: Alan Walker (New Zealand)
- League: Southern League; National League
- 2026: Southern League, 2nd of 10; National League, TBD
- Website: https://www.ferrymeadbaysfootball.co.nz/
Home colours	Away colours	Third colours

Ferrymead Bays FC is a semi-professional association football club based in Christchurch, New Zealand. They compete in the Southern League, and they have won the Mainland league title on five occasions. Ferrymead Bays play their home games at Ferrymead Park in Ferrymead and Barnett Park in Redcliffs, Christchurch.

The club colours are navy blue and white. Their club crest takes elements of the local suburbs and bays, featuring a football on waves. The club’s main rival is Cashmere Technical due to the club's close proximity and other recent rivals include Coastal Spirit.

The club nickname is "The Bays", a reference to the club's several bays and coastal landmarks around that part of the city the club is located. The club crest first featured "Ferrymead Bays Soccer" around the ball and changed to "Ferrymead Bays Football" due to the modern reference to game's name.

== History ==
The Club was formed in 1972 by a group of six enthusiasts. By 1986, the club typically entered 8 to 10 teams in the Canterbury Junior Football Association competitions. This number had increased to 42 teams, in addition to approximately 100 children in the beginners group.

Prior to 1997, the "A" teams in each grade normally played in Section 2 and often would win that section. However, it was rare for the "A" teams to stay in Section 1. This has changed after 1997 and a number of "A" teams have played in Section 1 for extended periods.

The increase in playing numbers and competitiveness has been due mostly to the continued housing development in the area and the introduction of the beginners group in 1990. Developing the football skills at an early age appears to have had flow-on benefits both in terms of playing numbers and competitiveness.

The Club has had the use of one senior pitch at Barnett Park from the outset. The junior pitches at Redcliffs Park and McCormacks Bay ten years ago left a lot to be desired – they were uneven with ponds! The improvements made by the Christchurch City Council to McCormacks Bay Park significantly enhanced the pitch conditions.

Hockey used to have two pitches at Barnett Park but these were used less as more hockey games were played on artificial surfaces at Porritt Park. With the expansion in soccer teams, there was a need for more home grounds and the CCC agreed we could have full use of Barnett Park which now has two senior, two junior and one intermediate pitches. The installation of practice lights in 1996 facilitated increased use of Barnett Park for training purposes.

The Club started out as Bays United AFC but the name was expanded to include Ferrymead to identify with the rapid expanding commercial area and its sponsorship opportunities plus to give a geographical location and avoid the confusion where some thought Bays meant Banks Peninsula Bays and included Akaroa! Bays reached the top in 2002 with the First Team winning the Mainland Premier League having won promotion from division 1 the year before.

Bays 1sts also won the Mainland Premier League for a second time when they were victorious in 2006. During the 2011 and 2012 season campaigns Ferrymead Bays won the league title on both occasions and again in 2017.

=== 2012 season ===
During the 2012 season, under coach Mick Braithwaite, the club experienced a period of notable success, winning four pieces of silverware including the Mainland Premier League for the second straight season plus the English Cup, South Island Football Championship and the Hurley Shield bringing their tally of Mainland Premier League titles to [number], among the highest in Christchurch.

=== 2013 season ===
The 2013 season saw Ferrymead Bays looking for a hat-trick of Mainland Premier League titles. The season finished with Ferrymead Bays coming in 3rd place as local rivals Cashmere Technical won the title with a total of 49 points and Nelson Suburbs finishing second with 41 points. Ferrymead Bays did however manage to retain the English Cup title beating rivals Coastal Spirit 2-1 in the final at ASB Park. Goals came from golden boot Russell Kamo and James O'Sullivan with goalkeeper Adam Highfield being awarded Man of the Match in the final. 2013 would also mark the end of coach Mick Braithwaite's successful tenure at the club. He had made the suggestion of going into retirement in the later half of the season to a number of individuals at the club.

=== 2014 season ===
Ferrymead Bays announced that Danny Halligan would take over as manager for the 2014 season. Danny Halligan represented New Zealand at international level and he ended his international playing career with 36 international caps and five goals to his credit. Ferrymead finished the 2014 season as they did in 2013 finishing in 3rd place with 34 points with rivals Cashmere Technical winning their second consecutive Premier League title levelling Ferrymead's number of titles with four.

=== 2026 season ===
Ferrymead Bays finished second in the Southern League and thus qualified for the National League Championship for the first time in the club's history. The club also reclaimed the English Cup title after ten years by beating Coastal Spirit 4-0 in the final. In the National League, the club secured an historic first victory at National League level, defeating 2023 champions Wellington Olympic 2-1 away from home.

== Season by season record ==
2022– (National League)

Season	Southern League									National League									English Cup	Chatham Cup	Top scorer	
Season	P	W	D	L	F	A	GD	Pts	Pos	P	W	D	L	F	A	GD	Pts	Pos	English Cup	Chatham Cup	Name	Goals
2022	18	9	3	6	37	30	+7	30	5th	Did not qualify									2nd	R3	(New Zealand) Michael White	8
2023	18	9	2	7	35	36	-1	29	5th	Did not qualify									QF	R3	(Japan) Kenshin Hayashi, (New Zealand) Daniel Thoms	6
2024	18	8	1	9	35	35	+0	25	5th	Did not qualify									QF	R4	(New Zealand) Cameron Rean	9
2025	18	8	4	6	33	32	+1	28	6th	Did not qualify									QF	R3	(United Kingdom) Chris Murphy, (New Zealand) Omar Cameron	5
2026	18	12	2	4	39	19	+20	38	2nd	Qualified									W	R3	(New Zealand) Omar Cameron	14

== Notable former players ==
- Greg Draper - The New Saints and New Zealand All Whites
- Ben Sigmund - Wellington Phoenix and New Zealand All Whites
- Glen Collins - The Football Kingz and New Zealand All Whites
- Joe Bell - Brøndby IF and New Zealand All Whites

== Honours ==
League

- Mainland Premier League: 5
  - 2002, 2006, 2011, 2012, 2017
- Southern Qualifying League: 1
  - 2021

Cup

- English Cup: 5
  - 2009, 2012, 2013, 2016, 2026
- South Island Football Championship: 1
  - 2012

Other

- Mainland Football Mens Team of the Year: 2011, 2012, 2017
- Hurley Shield: 2012
