= 2024 OFC Men's Champions League final =

Football match in Pirae, French Polynesia

- Event: 2024 OFC Men's Champions League
Auckland City	Pirae
(New Zealand)	(French Polynesia)
4	0
- Date: 24 May 2024
- Venue: Stade Pater, Pirae
- Man of the Match: Michael den Heijer (Auckland City)
- Referee: Ben Aukwai (Solomon Islands)
- Attendance: 819
- Weather: Partly Cloudy; 82 °F (28 °C); 84% humidity

The 2024 OFC Men's Champions League final was the final match of the 2024 OFC Men's Champions League, the 23rd edition of the Oceanian Club Championship, Oceania's premier club football tournament organized by the Oceania Football Confederation (OFC), and the 18th season under the current OFC Men's Champions League name.

The final was a single match between New Zealand's Auckland City and Tahiti's Pirae. The match took place at Stade Pater in Pirae on 24 May 2024.

Defending champions Auckland City FC defeated Tahitian Pirae 4–0 to win a record-extending twelfth title and their third in a row. Auckland City earned the right to play at the inaugural 2024 FIFA Intercontinental Cup, taking place in December 2024.

== Teams ==
In the following table, finals until 2006 were in the Oceania Club Championship era, since 2007 were in the OFC Champions League era.

Team	Previous finals appearances (bold indicates winners)
(New Zealand) Auckland City	11 (**2006**, **2009**, **2011**, **2012**, **2013**, **2014**, **2015**, **2016**, **2017**, **2022**, **2023**)
(French Polynesia) Pirae	1 (2006)

== Venue ==
Stade Pater was the venue for the final. This was the second time that the stadium hosted an OFC Men's Champions League final, after the 2005 OFC Club Championship final.

== Road to the final ==
Note: In all results below, the score of the finalist is given first (H: home; A: away; N: neutral).

(New Zealand) Auckland City				Round	(French Polynesia) Pirae			
Opponent	Agg.	1st leg	2nd leg	National play-offs	Opponent	Agg.	1st leg	2nd leg
(New Zealand) Wellington Olympic	4–3	1–0 (H)	3–3 (A)	Semi-finals	(French Polynesia) Tefana	2–2 (6–5 p)	1–1 (H)	1–1 (a.e.t.) (A)
Opponent	Result			Group stage	Opponent	Result		
(Fiji) Rewa	2–2			Matchday 1	(Samoa) Vaivase-Tai FC	6–0		
(Papua New Guinea) Hekari United	1–0			Matchday 2	(Vanuatu) Ifira Black Bird	5–1		
(Solomon Islands) Solomon Warriors	5–0			Matchday 3	(New Caledonia) AS Magenta	0–0		
**Group A winners**: Pos / Team / Pld / Pts; **1** / (New Zealand) Auckland City / **3** / **7**; 2 / (Fiji) Rewa / 3 / **7**; 3 / (Papua New Guinea) Hekari United / 3 / **3**; 4 / (Solomon Islands) Solomon Warriors / 3 / **0**; Source: OFC				Final standings	**Group B winners**: Pos / Team / Pld / Pts; **1** / (French Polynesia) Pirae (H) / **3** / **7**; 2 / (New Caledonia) AS Magenta / 3 / **7**; 3 / (Vanuatu) Ifira Black Bird / 3 / **3**; 4 / (Samoa) Vaivase-Tai FC / 3 / **0**; Source: OFC (H) Hosts			
Opponent	Result			Knockout stage	Opponent	Result		
(New Caledonia) AS Magenta	1–0			Semi-finals	(Fiji) Rewa	4–2 (a.e.t.)		

== Format ==
If the match is level at the end of 90 minutes of normal playing time, extra time will be played (two periods of 15 minutes each), where each team would be allowed to make a fourth substitution. If still tied after extra time, the match will be decided by a penalty shoot-out to determine the winners.

== Match ==
=== Details ===
24 May 2024
18:00 UTC−10

Auckland City (New Zealand)	4–0	(French Polynesia) Pirae
den Heijer 6'; Gillion 30'; Ukich 48'; Gray 59'	Report

Stade Pater, Pirae
Attendance: 819
Referee: Ben Aukwai (Solomon Islands)

**Auckland City**	**Pirae**

GK	1	(New Zealand) Conor Tracey
RB	12	(Kosovo) Regont Murati
CB	3	(New Zealand) Adam Mitchell
CB	4	(New Zealand) Christian Gray	(yellow card) 90+3'
CB	25	(New Zealand) Michael den Heijer
LB	13	(New Zealand) Nathan Lobo	(yellow card) 11'	(substituted off) 59'
CM	8	(Spain) Gerard Garriga		(substituted off) 70'
CM	10	(New Zealand) Dylan Manickum		(substituted off) 84'
CM	7	(New Zealand) Cameron Howieson (c)
CF	27	(New Zealand) Stipe Ukich	(yellow card) 36'	(substituted off) 59'
CF	19	(New Zealand) Liam Gillion		(substituted off) 84'
Substitutes:
GK	24	(New Zealand) Joe Wallis
DF	21	(New Zealand) Adam Bell
DF	23	(New Zealand) Alfie Rogers		(substituted on) 59'
MF	22	(China) Zhou Tong		(substituted on) 70'
FW	9	(New Zealand) Angus Kilkolly		(substituted on) 84'
FW	11	(New Zealand) Ryan de Vries		(substituted on) 59'
FW	16	(New Zealand) Joseph Lee		(substituted on) 84'
Manager:
(Spain) Albert Riera

GK	1	(French Polynesia) Francois Decoret
RB	26	(French Polynesia) Etienne Tave
CB	2	(French Polynesia) Taumihau Tiatia		(substituted off) 65'
CB	3	(French Polynesia) Matatia Paama
LB	5	(Belgium) Désiré Ngiamba
CM	8	(French Polynesia) Nick Tauotaha
CM	19	(French Polynesia) Heimano Bourebare		(substituted off) 104'
CAM	13	(French Polynesia) Ariiura Labaste		(substituted off) 65'
RW	14	(French Polynesia) Alvin Tehau (c)	(yellow card) 26'
CF	9	(French Polynesia) Heirauarii Salem		(substituted off) 84'
LW	11	(French Polynesia) Sandro Tau	(yellow card) 33'	(substituted off) 65'
Substitutes:
GK	16	(French Polynesia) Titouan Courtois
GK	23	(French Polynesia) Reihaamana Le Blastier
GK	32	(French Polynesia) Teva Durot
DF	4	(French Polynesia) Haumau Tanetoa
DF	12	(French Polynesia) Thibault Pito		(substituted on) 65'
MF	27	(French Polynesia) Taniava Barsinas
FW	7	(French Polynesia) Raimana Li Fung Kuee		(substituted on) 65'
FW	10	(French Polynesia) Patrick Tepa		(substituted on) 65'
FW	18	(French Polynesia) Yohann Tihoni
FW	22	(French Polynesia) Kali Lenoir		(substituted on) 84'
FW	25	(French Polynesia) Teriitaumatatini Martin
FW	28	(French Polynesia) Obadiah Rattinassamy
Manager:
(French Polynesia) Vatea Terai

Man of the Match:
Michael den Heijer (Auckland City)

Assistant referees:
Bertrand Brial (New Caledonia)
Folio Moeaki (Tonga)
Fourth official:
Lachlan Keevers (Australia)
Fifth official:
Malaetala Salanoa (Samoa)

**Match rules**

- 90 minutes.
- 30 minutes of extra time if scores level.
- Penalty shoot-out if scores still level.
- Maximum of three substitutions, with a fourth allowed in extra time.
