= 2023 OFC Champions League final =

- Event: 2023 OFC Champions League
Auckland City	Suva
(New Zealand)	(Fiji)
4	2
- Date: 27 May 2023
- Venue: VFF Freshwater Stadium, Port Vila
- Man of the Match: Cameron Howieson (Auckland City)
- Referee: David Yareboinen (Papua New Guinea)
- Attendance: 5,420
- Weather: Partly cloudy 26 °C (79 °F); 65% humidity

The 2023 OFC Champions League final was the final match of the 2023 OFC Champions League, the 22nd edition of the Oceanian Club Championship, Oceania's premier club football tournament organized by the Oceania Football Confederation (OFC), and the 17th season under the current OFC Champions League name.

The final was a single match between New Zealand's Auckland City and Fiji's Suva. The match took place at VFF Freshwater Stadium in Port Vila on 27 May 2023.

Defending champions Auckland City FC, defeated Fijian Suva 4–2 after extra time to win a record eleventh title and earned the right to play at the 2023 FIFA Club World Cup in Saudi Arabia. As they also won the 2022 OFC Champions League, they also earned the right to play at the 2025 FIFA Club World Cup.

== Teams ==
In the following table, finals until 2006 were in the Oceania Club Championship era, since 2007 were in the OFC Champions League era.

Team	Previous finals appearances (bold indicates winners)
(New Zealand) Auckland City	10 (**2006**, **2009**, **2011**, **2012**, **2013**, **2014**, **2015**, **2016**, **2017**, **2022**)
(Fiji) Suva	None

== Venue ==
VFF Freshwater Stadium was the venue for the final. This is the first time that the stadium hosted an OFC Champions League final.

== Road to the final ==
Note: In all results below, the score of the finalist is given first (H: home; A: away; N: neutral).

(New Zealand) Auckland City				Round	(Fiji) Suva			
Opponent	Agg.	1st leg	2nd leg	National play-offs	Opponent	Agg.	1st leg	2nd leg
(New Zealand) Wellington Olympic	6–4	1–1 (A)	5–3 (H)	Semi-finals	(Fiji) Rewa	3–2	1–1 (A)	2–1 (H)
Opponent	Result			Group stage	Opponent	Result		
(Solomon Islands) Solomon Warriors	3–1			Matchday 1	(Samoa) Lupe ole Soaga	6–0		
(Fiji) Suva	3–1			Matchday 2	(New Zealand) Auckland City	1–3		
(Samoa) Lupe ole Soaga	3–0 (Note: The Lupe ole Soaga v Auckland City match was cancelled due to injuries in the Lupe ole Soaga squad. Lupe ole Soaga SC will have all its matches cancelled and considered null and void. OFC will award victory and the resultant three points to the opposing team as well as the score of 3–0.)			Matchday 3	(Solomon Islands) Solomon Warriors	2–0		
**Group A winners**: Pos / Team / Pld / Pts; **1** / (New Zealand) Auckland City / **3** / **9**; 2 / (Fiji) Suva / 3 / **6**; 3 / (Solomon Islands) Solomon Warriors / 3 / **3**; 4 / (Samoa) Lupe ole Soaga / 3 / **0**; Source: OFC				Final standings	**Group A runners-up**: Pos / Team / Pld / Pts; 1 / (New Zealand) Auckland City / 3 / **9**; **2** / (Fiji) Suva / **3** / **6**; 3 / (Solomon Islands) Solomon Warriors / 3 / **3**; 4 / (Samoa) Lupe ole Soaga / 3 / **0**; Source: OFC			
Opponent	Result			Knockout stage	Opponent	Result		
(Vanuatu) Ifira Black Bird	2–2 (5–4 p)			Semi-finals	(French Polynesia) Pirae	4–2 (a.e.t.)		

== Format ==
If the match is level at the end of 90 minutes of normal playing time, extra time will be played (two periods of 15 minutes each), where each team would be allowed to make a fourth substitution. If still tied after extra time, the match will be decided by a penalty shoot-out to determine the winners.

== Match ==
=== Details ===
27 May 2023
14:00 UTC+11

Auckland City (New Zealand)	4–2 (a.e.t.)	(Fiji) Suva
Kilkolly 34' (pen.); De Vries 45+3', 120+4'; Howieson 109'	Report	Saniel 66'; Tahioa 83'

VFF Freshwater Stadium, Port Vila
Attendance: 5,420
Referee: David Yareboinen (Papua New Guinea)

**Auckland City**	**Suva**

GK	1	(New Zealand) Conor Tracey
RB	14	(New Zealand) Jordan Vale		(substituted off) 86'
CB	3	(New Zealand) Adam Mitchell
CB	5	(New Zealand) Michael den Heijer
LB	13	(New Zealand) Nathan Lobo	(yellow card) 70'
CM	8	(Spain) Gerard Garriga	(yellow card) 51' (yellow-red card) 60'
CM	2	(New Zealand) Mario Ilich
CM	7	(New Zealand) Cameron Howieson (c)	(yellow card) 99'
RW	16	(New Zealand) Joseph Lee		(substituted off) 68'
CF	11	(New Zealand) Angus Kilkolly	(yellow card) 90+2'	(substituted off) 91'
LW	10	(New Zealand) Dylan Manickum		(substituted off) 39'
Substitutes:
GK	24	(New Zealand) Joe Wallis
DF	4	(New Zealand) Christian Gray
DF	6	(New Zealand) Dan Morgan
DF	12	(Kosovo) Regont Murati		(substituted on) 68'
DF	24	(China) Zhou Tong		(substituted on) 86'
MF	15	(New Zealand) Aidan Carey
MF	23	(New Zealand) Matt Ellis
FW	11	(New Zealand) Ryan de Vries		(substituted on) 39'
FW	19	(New Zealand) Liam Gillion		(substituted on) 91'
Manager:
(Spain) Albert Riera

GK	22	(Fiji) Akuila Mateusuva
RB	2	(Fiji) Simione Nabenu		(substituted off) 25'
CB	4	(Fiji) Inoke Turagalailai
CB	5	(Fiji) Remueru Takiate
LB	3	(Fiji) Meli Codro	(yellow card) 110'
CM	24	(Vanuatu) Alex Saniel
CM	10	(Solomon Islands) Marlon Tahioa		(substituted off) 104'
CM	11	(Fiji) Ravnesh Karan Singh
RW	13	(Vanuatu) Azariah Soromon	(yellow card) 60' (yellow-red card) 99'
CF	7	(Fiji) Dave Radrigai	(yellow card) 58'
LW	14	(Fiji) Samuela Drudru (c)		(substituted off) 36'
Substitutes:
GK	1	(Fiji) Jovilisi Borisi
GK	21	(Fiji) Sanaila Waqanicakau
DF	15	(Fiji) Waisake Navunigasau
MF	6	(Fiji) Ramzan Khan			(substituted on) 72'
MF	8	(Fiji) Malakai Rakula			(substituted on) 72'
FW	9	(Fiji) Bruce Hughes		(substituted on) 104'
FW	19	(Fiji) Merrill Nand	(yellow card) 68'	(substituted on) 25'	(substituted off) 72'
FW	23	(Fiji) Rusiate Matarerega		(substituted on) 36'	(substituted off) 72'
Manager:
(Fiji) Maxwell Thaggard

Man of the Match:
Cameron Howieson (Auckland City)

Assistant referees:
Bertrand Brial (New Caledonia)
Jeremy Garae (Vanuatu)
Fourth official:
Ben Aukwai (Solomon Islands)
Fifth official:
Jeffery Solodia (Solomon Islands)

**Match rules**

- 90 minutes.
- 30 minutes of extra time if scores level.
- Penalty shoot-out if scores still level.
- Maximum of three substitutions, with a fourth allowed in extra time.
