= List of Cook Islands international footballers =

The Cook Islands national football team represents the country of the Cook Islands in international association football. It is fielded by the Cook Islands Football Association, the governing body of football in the Cook Islands, and competes as a member of the Oceania Football Confederation (OFC), which encompasses the countries of Oceania. Cook Islands played their first international match on 11 September 1971 in a 16–1 loss to Papua New Guinea in French Polynesia.

Cook Islands have competed in numerous competitions, and all players who have played in at least one international match, either as a member of the starting eleven or as a substitute, are listed below. Each player's details include his playing position while with the team, the number of caps earned and goals scored in all international matches, and details of the first and most recent matches played in. The names are initially ordered by number of caps (in descending order), then by date of debut, then by alphabetical order. All statistics are correct up to and including the match played on 17 March 2022.

== Key ==
Positions key
GK	Goalkeeper
DF	Defender
MF	Midfielder
FW	Forward

Position
Playing positions are listed according to the tactical formations that were employed at the time.
Caps and goals comprise those in the FIFA World Cup and OFC Nations Cup, their associated qualification matches, as well as Pacific Games matches and international friendly matches.

== Players ==
Cook Islands national team football players
Player	Pos.	Caps	Goals	Debut		Last or most recent match		Ref.
Player	Pos.	Caps	Goals	Date	Opponent	Date	Opponent	Ref.
Tony Jamieson	GK	22	0	10 June 2000	American Samoa	26 November 2011	Tonga	
John Pareanga	DF	20	2	28 September 1998	Australia	3 September 2011	Fiji	
Joseph Chambers	MF	14	0	11 November 1996	Tonga	15 May 2004	Tonga	
Mark Jamieson	DF	13	1	8 June 2000	Tonga	17 May 2004	New Caledonia	
Miitamariki Joseph	DF	12	0	27 August 2007	Fiji	26 November 2011	Tonga	
Stenter Mani	FW	12	2	11 November 1996	Tonga	11 June 2001	Tahiti	
James Nand	DF	12	0	11 November 1996	Tonga	11 June 2001	Tahiti	
Nikorima Te Miha	FW	12	2	28 September 1998	Australia	26 November 2011	Tonga	
Daniel Shepherd	MF	12	1	8 June 2000	Tonga	3 September 2007	Tahiti	
Grover Harmon	FW	12	1	13 June 2009	Tonga	17 March 2022	Solomon Islands	
Tuka Tisam	MF	11	0	10 May 2004	Tahiti	26 November 2011	Tonga	
Paavo Tariu Mustonen	DF	11	1	27 August 2007	Fiji	4 September 2015	American Samoa	
Campbell Best	FW	11	3	13 June 2009	Tonga	4 September 2015	American Samoa	
Taylor Saghabi	FW	11	6	27 August 2011	Papua New Guinea	17 March 2022	Solomon Islands	
Tahiri Elikana	GK	10	0	27 August 2011	Papua New Guinea	17 March 2022	Solomon Islands	
Tristram Chambers	MF	9	0	11 November 1996	Tonga	11 June 2001	Tahiti	
Edward Drollett	MF	9	1	11 November 1996	Tonga	27 August 2007	Fiji	
Junior Puroku	MF	9	1	8 June 2000	Tonga	26 November 2011	Tonga	
Ngatuaine Mani	DF	9	1	8 June 2000	Tonga	11 June 2001	Tahiti	
Nathan Tisam	DF	8	0	10 May 2004	New Caledonia	2 September 2015	Samoa	
Eugenie Tatuava	FW	8	0	10 May 2004	Tahiti	3 September 2007	Tahiti	
Joseph Ngauora	MF	8	3	11 June 2009	Tonga	26 November 2011	Tonga	
Adrian Shepherd	MF	7	0	10 May 2004	Tahiti	3 September 2007	Tahiti	
Paul van Eijk	DF	7	0	17 May 2004	New Caledonia	24 November 2011	American Samoa	
John Michael Quijano	MF	7	0	29 August 2007	New Caledonia	22 November 2011	Samoa	
Teariki Mateariki	MF	6	2	10 May 2004	Tahiti	3 September 2007	Tahiti	
Branden Turepu	DF	6	0	13 June 2009	Tonga	26 November 2011	Tonga	
Heath Dickenson	DF	5	0	28 September 1998	Australia	8 June 2001	New Zealand	
Teremaki Paniani	MF	5	0	28 September 1998	Australia	21 June 2000	Solomon Islands	
Thomas Le Mouton	MF	5	1	27 August 2007	Fiji	13 June 2009	Tonga	
Gichin Fuhiniu	MF	5	0	22 November 2011	Samoa	4 September 2015	American Samoa	
Roger Manuel	MF	5	0	13 June 2009	Tonga	22 November 2011	Samoa	
Vaiola Tiere	GK	4	0	11 November 1996	Tonga	30 September 1998	Fiji	
Aturangi Putere	MF	4	0	10 May 2004	Tahiti	17 May 2004	New Caledonia	
Victor Samuel	DF	4	0	10 May 2004	Tahiti	17 May 2004	New Caledonia	
Augusty Tihoni Bartillard	DF	4	0	27 August 2007	Fiji	3 September 2007	Tahiti	
Eddie Brogan	DF	4	0	27 August 2007	Fiji	3 September 2007	Tahiti	
Ano Tisam	FW	4	0	27 August 2007	Fiji	13 June 2009	Tonga	
Stephen Willis	MF	4	0	27 August 2007	Fiji	3 September 2007	Tahiti	
Allan Boere	MF	4	0	13 June 2009	Tonga	3 September 2007	Fiji	
Nicholas Funnell	MF	4	0	13 June 2009	Tonga	1 September 2011	Kiribati	
Harlem Simiona	MF	4	0	31 August 2015	Tonga	17 March 2022	Solomon Islands	
Dean Tereu	DF	3	0	28 September 1998	Australia	19 June 2000	Australia	
Justin Shepherd	FW	3	0	4 June 2001	Solomon Islands	11 June 2001	Tahiti	
Geoffrey Strickland	FW	3	0	10 May 2004	Tahiti	17 May 2004	New Caledonia	
Roururoroa Une	MF	3	0	12 May 2004	Solomon Islands	17 May 2004	New Caledonia	
Emiel Burrow	FW	3	0	22 November 2011	Samoa	4 September 2015	American Samoa	
Tyrell Baringer-Tahiri	DF	3	0	31 August 2015	Tonga	4 September 2015	American Samoa	
Iona Lupena	GK	3	0	13 June 2009	Tonga	4 September 2015	American Samoa	
Josh Karika	MF	3	0	31 August 2015	Tonga	4 September 2015	American Samoa	
Legend Pareta	MF	3	0	31 August 2015	Tonga	4 September 2015	American Samoa	
Jake Stuart	DF	3	0	31 August 2015	Tonga	4 September 2015	American Samoa	
Ishak Mohammed	FW	3	0	2 September 2015	Samoa	17 March 2022	Solomon Islands	
Nelson Akava	MF	2	0	11 November 1996	Tonga	13 November 1996	Samoa	
Noel Tutangata	MF	2	0	11 November 1996	Tonga	13 November 1996	Samoa	
Sadaraka Puroku	FW	2	0	28 September 1998	Australia	30 September 1998	Fiji	
David Angene	FW	2	0	12 May 2004	Solomon Islands	17 May 2004	New Caledonia	
Barnabas Enjoy	DF	2	0	4 June 2001	Solomon Islands	11 June 2001	Tahiti	
Teariki Goodwin	MF	2	0	11 November 1996	Tonga	13 November 1996	Samoa	
Benjamin Rairoa	DF	2	0	11 November 1996	Tonga	13 November 1996	Samoa	
Alex McGregor	MF	2	0	31 August 2015	Tonga	2 September 2015	Samoa	
Michael Mouauri	DF	2	0	11 November 1996	Tonga	13 November 1996	Samoa	
Alex Napa	DF	2	0	11 November 1996	Tonga	13 November 1996	Samoa	
Jimmy Katoa	DF	1	0	30 September 1998	Fiji	30 September 1998	Fiji	
Jonathan Kairua	GK	1	0	8 June 2000	Tonga	8 June 2000	Tonga	
Hinoi Henry	MF	1	0	19 June 2000	Australia	19 June 2000	Australia	
Alex Tearii	DF	1	0	21 June 2000	Solomon Islands	21 June 2000	Solomon Islands	
Raymond Newnham	DF	1	0	6 June 2001	Vanuatu	6 June 2001	Vanuatu	
Kunda Tom	FW	1	0	1 September 2007	Tuvalu	1 September 2007	Tuvalu	
Teriiahoroa Framheim	DF	1	0	26 November 2011	Tonga	26 November 2011	Tonga	
Arus Sem	FW	1	0	31 August 2015	Tonga	31 August 2015	Tonga	
Daryl Areai	MF	1	0	17 March 2022	Solomon Islands	17 March 2022	Solomon Islands	
Thane Beal	MF	1	0	17 March 2022	Solomon Islands	17 March 2022	Solomon Islands	
Emiel Burrow	FW	1	0	17 March 2022	Solomon Islands	17 March 2022	Solomon Islands	
Ismail Hadife	MF	1	0	17 March 2022	Solomon Islands	17 March 2022	Solomon Islands	
Lee Harmon	FW	1	0	17 March 2022	Solomon Islands	17 March 2022	Solomon Islands	
Benjamin Mata	FW	1	0	17 March 2022	Solomon Islands	17 March 2022	Solomon Islands	
Toru Mateariki	FW	1	0	17 March 2022	Solomon Islands	17 March 2022	Solomon Islands	
Orin Prattley	DF	1	0	17 March 2022	Solomon Islands	17 March 2022	Solomon Islands	
Dwayne Tiputoa	MF	1	0	17 March 2022	Solomon Islands	17 March 2022	Solomon Islands	
