= 2024 in New Zealand association football =

Football in New Zealand
- Season: 2024

Men's football
- National League: Auckland City
- Northern League: Auckland City
- Central League: Wellington Olympic
- Southern League: Cashmere Technical
- Chatham Cup: Wellington Olympic
- Charity Cup: Wellington Olympic

Women's football
- Women's National League: Auckland United
- NRFL Women's Premiership: Auckland United
- Kate Sheppard Cup: Auckland United

The 2024 season was the 134th competitive association football season in New Zealand.

== National teams ==
=== New Zealand men's national football team ===
==== Friendlies ====
7 September Friendly	Mexico	3–0	New Zealand	Pasadena, United States
18:00	Pineda 5'; Huerta 53'; Romo 57'	Report		Stadium: Rose Bowl; Attendance: 25,271; Referee: Joe Dickerson (United States)

10 September Friendly	United States	1–1	New Zealand	Cincinnati, United States
19:00 EDT (UTC-4:00)	Pulisic 69'	Report	Waine 89'	Stadium: TQL Stadium; Attendance: 15,711; Referee: Selvin Brown (Honduras)

14 October Friendly	New Zealand	4–0	Malaysia	Auckland, New Zealand
19:00 UTC+13	Just 53'; Garbett 61'; Wood 72'; Rogerson 90'	Report Report		Stadium: North Harbour Stadium; Attendance: 8,513; Referee: Jack Morgan (Australia)

==== 2024 FIFA Series ====
22 March 2024 FIFA Series	Egypt	1–0	New Zealand	New Administrative Capital, Egypt
22:00 UTC+2	Mohamed 29' (pen.)	Report		Stadium: New Administrative Capital Stadium; Attendance: 30,200; Referee: Clement Franklin Kpan (Ivory Coast)

26 March 2024 FIFA Series	New Zealand	0–0 (2–4 p)	Tunisia	Cairo, Egypt
22:00 UTC+2		Report		Stadium: Cairo International Stadium; Attendance: 45; Referee: Ahmed El Ghandour (Egypt)
	Penalties
	Waine (penalty missed); Barbarouses (penalty scored); Just (penalty missed); Rufer (penalty scored)		(penalty scored) Ben Romdhane; (penalty scored) Laïdouni; (penalty scored) Abdi; (penalty scored) Ghram

==== 2024 OFC Nations Cup ====
===== Group A =====
Pos	Team	Pld	W	D	L	GF	GA	GD	Pts	Qualification
1	New Zealand	2	2	0	0	7	0	+7	6	Advance to knockout stage
2	Vanuatu (H)	2	1	0	1	1	4	−3	3	Advance to knockout stage
3	Solomon Islands	2	0	0	2	0	4	−4	0	
4	New Caledonia	0	0	0	0	0	0	0	0	Withdrew

Source: OFC
Rules for classification: Group stage tiebreakers
(H) Hosts

15 June	New Zealand	Cancelled	New Caledonia	Port Vila, Vanuatu
15:00 (UTC+11)				Stadium: VFF Freshwater Stadium
Note: On 5 June 2024, New Caledonia withdrew from the 2024 OFC Nations Cup due to the serious crisis in the country.

18 June	New Zealand	3–0	Solomon Islands	Port Vila, Vanuatu
15:00 (UTC+11)	Waine 6', 11'; Barbarouses 45+4'	Report		Stadium: VFF Freshwater Stadium; Attendance: 3,000; Referee: David Yareboinen (Papua New Guinea)

21 June	Vanuatu	0–4	New Zealand	Port Vila, Vanuatu
15:00 (UTC+11)		Report	Mata 10', 27'; Just 63'; Old 78'	Stadium: VFF Freshwater Stadium; Attendance: 7,200; Referee: Veer Singh (Fiji)

====== Knockout stage ======
27 June Semi-final	New Zealand	5–0	Tahiti	Port Vila, Vanuatu
11:00	Surman 7'; Waine 45', 53'; Barbarouses 45+3', 72'	Report		Stadium: Freshwater Stadium; Attendance: 2,000; Referee: Veer Singh (Fiji)

====== Final ======
30 June	New Zealand	3–0	Vanuatu	Port Vila, Vanuatu
15:00	Howieson 2'; Randall 83'; Mata 90+2'	Report		Stadium: Freshwater Stadium; Attendance: 10,000; Referee: Ben Aukwai (Solomon Islands)

==== 2026 FIFA World Cup qualification ====
===== Second round =====
Pos	Team	Pld	W	D	L	GF	GA	GD	Pts	Qualification	(New Zealand)	(French Polynesia)	(Vanuatu)	(Samoa)
1	New Zealand	3	3	0	0	19	1	+18	9	Advance to the third round	—	3–0	8–1	—
2	Tahiti	3	2	0	1	5	3	+2	6	Advance to the third round	—	—	2–0	—
3	Vanuatu	3	1	0	2	5	11	−6	3		—	—	—	4–1
4	Samoa	3	0	0	3	1	15	−14	0		0–8	0–3	—	—

Source: OFC
Rules for classification: Tiebreakers

11 October Second round	New Zealand	3–0	Tahiti	Port Vila, Vanuatu
13:00 UTC+11	Just 2'; Wood 67'; Waine 89'	Report		Stadium: VFF Freshwater Stadium; Attendance: 1,000; Referee: Médéric Lacour (New Caledonia)

15 November Second round	New Zealand	8–1	Vanuatu	Hamilton, New Zealand
19:30 UTC+13	Garbett 11'; Wood 23', 24'; Bindon 32'; Kaltak 38' (o.g.); Just 74'; Singh 82'; McCowatt 89'	FIFA; OFC	Tasip 17'	Stadium: Waikato Stadium; Attendance: 10,113; Referee: Ben Aukwai (Solomon Islands)

18 November Second round	Samoa	0–8	New Zealand	Auckland, New Zealand
19:30 UTC+13		FIFA; OFC	McCowatt 24'; Wood 28', 34', 60'; Stamenić 62'; de Vries 75'; Just 87'; Waine 90+2' (pen.)	Stadium: Mount Smart Stadium; Attendance: 5,327; Referee: Veer Singh (Fiji)

=== New Zealand women's national football team ===
==== Friendlies ====
6 April 2024 Friendly	New Zealand	4–0	Thailand	Christchurch, New Zealand
15:00 UTC+13	Wilkinson 17'; Hand 64'; Kitching 71', 87' (pen.)	Report		Stadium: Rugby League Park; Attendance: 6,031; Referee: Casey Reibelt (Australia)

9 April 2024 Friendly	New Zealand	0–0	Thailand	Christchurch, New Zealand
19:00 UTC+12		Report		Stadium: Rugby League Park; Attendance: 3,503; Referee: Rebecca Durcau (Australia)

13 July Friendly	New Zealand	1–1	Zambia	Vichy, France
17:00	Kitching 67' (pen.)	Report	Chileshe 49'	Stadium: Stade Louis Darragon

==== OFC Women's Olympic Qualifying Tournament ====
===== Group B =====
Pos	Team	Pld	W	D	L	GF	GA	GD	Pts	Qualification
1	New Zealand	3	3	0	0	14	0	+14	9	Knockout stage
2	Samoa (H)	3	2	0	1	3	6	−3	6	Knockout stage
3	Tonga	3	1	0	2	2	6	−4	3	
4	Vanuatu	3	0	0	3	1	8	−7	0	

Source: OFC
(H) Hosts

7 February 2024	New Zealand	3–0	Tonga	Apia, Samoa
13:00	Jale 2', 16'; Green 13' (pen.)	Report		Stadium: FFS Football Stadium (Field 1); Referee: Ben Aukwai (Solomon Islands)

10 February 2024	New Zealand	6–0	Samoa	Apia, Samoa
17:00 UTC+13	Hand 8'; Taylor 16'; Dade 23' (o.g.); Fraser 34'; Green 60'; Foster 75'	Report		Stadium: FFS Football Stadium (Field 1); Referee: David Yareboinen (Papua New Guinea)

13 February 2024	Vanuatu	0–5	New Zealand	Apia, Samoa
16:00 UTC+13		Report	Hand 12'; Hassett 21'; Riley 30', 43'; Fraser 50'	Stadium: FFS Football Stadium (Field 2); Referee: Kavitesh Behari (Fiji)

===== Knockout stage =====
16 February 2024 Semi-final	New Zealand	7–1	Fiji	Apia, Samoa
17:00	Riley 6', 45+6'; Hand 24', 45+4'; Jale 45+2', 67', 83'	Report	Nasau 90+3'	Stadium: FFS Football Stadium (Field 1); Referee: David Yareboinen (Papua New Guinea)

19 February 2024 Final	Solomon Islands	1–11	New Zealand	Apia, Samoa
17:00	David 55'	Report	Hand 12'; Wilkinson 20', 56'; Bowen 25'; Jale 37', 63'; Riley 45+1', 52'; Kitching 70', 76'; Nathan 88'	Stadium: FFS Football Stadium (Field 1); Referee: Norbert Hauata (Tahiti)

==== 2024 Summer Olympics ====
===== Group A =====
Pos	Team	Pld	W	D	L	GF	GA	GD	Pts	Qualification
1	France (H)	3	2	0	1	6	5	+1	6	Advance to knockout stage
2	Canada	3	3	0	0	5	2	+3	3 (Note: On 27 July 2024, Canada was penalized 6 points by FIFA for their coaching staff's involvement in illegal drone spying at an official training venue. The decision was upheld by CAS on 31 July.)	Advance to knockout stage
3	Colombia	3	1	0	2	4	4	0	3	Advance to knockout stage
4	New Zealand	3	0	0	3	2	6	−4	0	

Source: FIFA
(H) Hosts
Notes:

25 July	Canada	2–1	New Zealand	Saint-Étienne, France
17:00	Lacasse 45+4'; Viens 79'	Report	Barry 13'	Stadium: Stade Geoffroy-Guichard; Attendance: 2,674; Referee: Tess Olofsson (Sweden)

28 July	New Zealand	0–2	Colombia	Décines-Charpieu, France
17:00		Report	Restrepo 27'; Santos 72'	Stadium: Stade de Lyon; Referee: Kim Yu-jeong (South Korea)

31 July	New Zealand	1–2	France	Décines-Charpieu, France
21:00	Taylor 43'	Report	Katoto 22', 49'	Stadium: Stade de Lyon; Referee: Edina Alves Batista (Brazil)

=== New Zealand national under-23 football team ===
==== Friendlies ====
18 July Friendly	Uzbekistan	3–1	New Zealand	Nice, France
17:00 UTC+2	Shomurodov 25'; Urunov 87'; Norchaev 89'	Report	Randall 85'	Stadium: Stade de Nice

==== 2024 Summer Olympics ====
===== Group A =====
Pos	Team	Pld	W	D	L	GF	GA	GD	Pts	Qualification
1	France (H)	3	3	0	0	7	0	+7	9	Advance to knockout stage
2	United States	3	2	0	1	7	4	+3	6	Advance to knockout stage
3	New Zealand	3	1	0	2	3	8	−5	3	
4	Guinea	3	0	0	3	1	6	−5	0	

Source: FIFA
Rules for classification: Group stage tiebreakers
(H) Hosts

24 July 2024	Guinea	1–2	New Zealand	Nice, France
17:00 UTC+2	Diawara 72'	Report	Garbett 25'; Waine 76'	Stadium: Allianz Riviera; Attendance: 4,909; Referee: Adel Al-Naqbi (United Arab Emirates)

27 July 2024	New Zealand	1–4	United States	Marseille, France
19:00 UTC+2	Randall 78'	Report	Mihailovic 8' (pen.); Zimmerman 12'; Busio 30'; Aaronson 58'	Stadium: Stade de Marseille; Referee: Glenn Nyberg (Sweden)

30 July 2024	New Zealand	0–3	France	Marseille, France
19:00 UTC+2		Report	Mateta 19'; Doué 71'; Kalimuendo 74'	Stadium: Stade Vélodrome; Referee: Katia García (Mexico)

=== New Zealand national under-20 football team ===
==== Results and fixtures ====
===== 2024 OFC U-19 Men's Championship =====
====== Group B ======
Pos	Team	Pld	W	D	L	GF	GA	GD	Pts	Qualification
1	New Zealand	3	3	0	0	18	0	+18	9	Knockout stage
2	New Caledonia	3	2	0	1	4	5	−1	6	Knockout stage
3	Samoa	3	1	0	2	4	8	−4	3	5th place match
4	Papua New Guinea	3	0	0	3	2	15	−13	0	7th place match

Source: OFC

6 July 2024	New Zealand	3–0	New Caledonia	FFS Football Stadium, Apia
12:00	Ukich 18' (pen.); Watson 45+5'; Kelly 53'	Report		Attendance: 250; Referee: Veer Singh (Fiji)

9 July 2024	New Zealand	5–0	Samoa	FFS Football Stadium, Apia
15:00	Phoenix 14', 59'; Gillion 36'; Partridge 74'; Brown 90' (o.g.)	Report		Attendance: 500; Referee: Kavitesh Behari (Fiji)

12 July 2024	Papua New Guinea	0–10	New Zealand	FFS Football Stadium, Apia
12:00		Report	Sloane-Rodrigues 5', 26'; Makowem 11', 16'; Kelly 18', 58', 71'; Walker 67'; Ukich 75'; Watson 88'	Attendance: 300; Referee: Timothy Niu (Solomon Islands)

====== Knockout stage ======
15 July 2024 Semi-final	New Zealand	1–0	Fiji	FFS Football Stadium, Apia
15:00	Watson 48'	Report		Attendance: 300; Referee: David Yareboinen (Papua New Guinea)

18 July 2024 Final	New Caledonia	0–4	New Zealand	FFS Football Stadium, Apia
14:00		Report	Candy 37'; Supyk 64', 67' (pen.); Bulkeley 74'	Attendance: 500; Referee: Veer Singh (Fiji)

=== New Zealand women's national under-20 football team ===
==== Friendlies ====
11 July	New Zealand	1–1	Australia	Wellington, New Zealand
14:30 UTC+12	Bercelli 20'	Report	Morris 59'	Stadium: Porirua Park

14 July	New Zealand	1–1 (10–11 p)	Australia	Upper Hutt, New Zealand
14:30 UTC+12	Ingham	Source	Woods	Stadium: NZCIS; Attendance: 0 (Behind closed doors)

==== 2024 FIFA U-20 Women's World Cup ====
===== Group E =====
Pos	Team	Pld	W	D	L	GF	GA	GD	Pts	Qualification
1	Japan	3	3	0	0	13	1	+12	9	Knockout stage
2	Austria	3	2	0	1	5	4	+1	6	Knockout stage
3	Ghana	3	1	0	2	5	7	−2	3	
4	New Zealand	3	0	0	3	2	13	−11	0	

Source: FIFA
Rules for classification: Group stage tiebreakers

2 September 2024	Japan	7–0	New Zealand	Estadio El Techo, Bogotá
17:00	Hijikata 16', 38'; Sasai 41', 90+1'; Oyama 45'; Koyama 60'; Hayama 75'	Report		Referee: Dione Rissios (Chile)

5 September 2024	Austria	3–1	New Zealand	Estadio El Techo, Bogotá
20:00	Gutmann 10', 15'; Mädl 67'	Report	Clegg 90'	Referee: Akissi Konan (Côte d'Ivoire)

8 September 2024	New Zealand	1–3	Ghana	Estadio Pascual Guerrero, Cali
18:00	Elliott 64'	Report	Abdulai 59', 72'; Twum 90+6'	Referee: María Victoria Daza (Colombia)

=== New Zealand national under-17 football team ===
==== Results and fixtures ====
===== 2024 OFC U-16 Championship =====
====== Group A ======
Pos	Team	Pld	W	D	L	GF	GA	GD	Pts	Qualification
1	New Zealand	3	3	0	0	23	1	+22	9	Knockout stage
2	Fiji	3	2	0	1	6	10	−4	6	Knockout stage
3	Cook Islands	3	1	0	2	4	10	−6	3	5th place match
4	Vanuatu	3	0	0	3	3	15	−12	0	7th place match

Source: OFC

28 July 2024	New Zealand	9–0	Vanuatu	Stade Fautaua, Pirae
12:00	Lienard 20'; Cartwright 29', 66'; Brooke-Smith 42'; Fitzharris 45+1', 76'; Martin 58'; Britton 78'; Smith 86'	Report		Attendance: 100; Referee: Shama Maemae (Solomon Islands)

31 July 2024	New Zealand	7–1	Fiji	Stade Fautaua, Pirae
12:00	Cartwright 27', 50'; Cardozo 35'; Brooke-Smith 43', 45', 81'; Perez Baldoni 90+3'	Report	Rasorewa 21'	Attendance: 100; Referee: Ben Aukwai (Solomon Islands)

3 August 2024	Cook Islands	0–7	New Zealand	Stade Fautaua, Pirae
12:00		Report	Smith 2', 10'; Banza 14'; Britton 29', 43', 90+5'; Perniskie 64'	Attendance: 100; Referee: Norbert Hauata (Tahiti)

====== Knockout stage ======
7 August 2024 Semi-final	New Zealand	5–0	New Caledonia	Stade Pater, Pirae
15:00	Cartwright 3', 43', 53'; Cardozo 29'; Smith 69' (pen.)	Report		Attendance: 300; Referee: Norbert Hauata (Tahiti)

10 August 2024 Final	New Zealand	3–1	Fiji	Stade Pater, Pirae
18:00	Martin 3'; Brooke-Smith 62'; Cardozo 67'	Report	Khan 28'	Attendance: 200; Referee: David Yareboinen (Papua New Guinea)

=== New Zealand women’s national under-17 football team ===
==== Results and fixtures ====
===== Friendlies =====
October 2024	New Zealand	0–0	Mexico	Dominican Republic
		Report		Attendance: 0 (Behind closed doors)

===== 2024 OFC U-16 Women's Championship =====
====== Group B ======
Pos	Team	Pld	W	D	L	GF	GA	GD	Pts	Qualification
1	New Zealand	3	3	0	0	14	0	+14	9	Knockout stage
2	New Caledonia	3	2	0	1	5	10	−5	6	Knockout stage
3	Solomon Islands	3	1	0	2	3	3	0	3	5th place match
4	Tahiti	3	0	0	3	1	10	−9	0	7th place match

Source: OFC

9 September 2024	New Zealand	8–0	New Caledonia	Suva, Fiji
12:00	Tichbon 5', 32'; Bennett 12', 28', 57', 69'; Duncan 22', 77'	Report		Stadium: HFC Bank Stadium; Attendance: 50; Referee: Torika Delai (Fiji)

12 September 2024	New Zealand	5–0	Tahiti	Suva, Fiji
12:00	Volk 25'; Robins 45'; Duncan 45+2'; Avery 59'; Solomon 72'	Report		Stadium: HFC Bank Stadium; Attendance: 50; Referee: Gerard Ionatana (Samoa)

15 September 2024	Solomon Islands	0–1	New Zealand	Suva, Fiji
12:00		Report	O'Neill 11'	Stadium: HFC Bank Stadium; Attendance: 100; Referee: Jarethy George (Vanuatu)

====== Knockout stage ======
18 September 2024 Semi-final	New Zealand	8–0	Tonga	Suva, Fiji
15:00	Bennett 6'; Pugh 12'; Duncan 22', 90'; Vlok 33'; McGillivray 54'; March 70'; Avery 89'	Report		Stadium: HFC Bank Stadium; Attendance: 50; Referee: Jarethy George (Vanuatu)

21 September 2024 Final	Samoa	0–4	New Zealand	Suva, Fiji
15:00		Report	Pugh 19'; Vlok 45+2', 56'; Bennett 90'	Stadium: HFC Bank Stadium; Attendance: 200; Referee: Torika Delai (Fiji)

===== 2024 FIFA U-17 Women's World Cup =====
====== Group A ======
Pos	Team	Pld	W	D	L	GF	GA	GD	Pts	Qualification
1	Nigeria	3	3	0	0	9	1	+8	9	Knockout stage
2	Ecuador	3	2	0	1	6	4	+2	6	Knockout stage
3	Dominican Republic (H)	3	0	1	2	1	4	−3	1	
4	New Zealand	3	0	1	2	2	9	−7	1	

Source: FIFA
Rules for classification: Group stage tiebreakers
(H) Hosts

16 October 2024	New Zealand	1–4	Nigeria	Estadio Cibao FC, Santiago de los Caballeros
16:00	Saxon 60'	Report	Moshood 2'; Adegoke 13'; Abdulwahab 28'; Afolabi 55'	Attendance: 1,040; Referee: Olatz Rivera (Spain)

19 October 2024	Dominican Republic	1–1	New Zealand	Estadio Cibao FC, Santiago de los Caballeros
19:00	Brito 68'	Report	Mercedes 61' (o.g.)	Attendance: 3,258; Referee: Asaka Koizumi (Japan)

22 October 2024	Ecuador	4–0	New Zealand	Estadio Cibao FC, Santiago de los Caballeros
19:00	Arboleda 41'; Chiuchiolo 43', 49'; Morán 79'	Report		Attendance: 1,248; Referee: Lê Thị Ly (Vietnam)

== FIFA competitions ==
=== FIFA Intercontinental Cup ===
22 September 2024 First Round	Al Ain (United Arab Emirates)	6–2	(New Zealand) Auckland City	Al Ain
20:00 GST	Cardoso 6'; Gassama 11'; Palacios 45+1'; Rahimi 78', 90+4'; Kaku 90+2'	Report	Lagos 43'; Bevan 54'	Stadium: Hazza bin Zayed Stadium; Attendance: 13,826; Referee: Mustapha Ghorbal (Algeria)

== OFC Competitions ==
=== OFC Champions League ===
==== National play-offs ====
9 March 2024	Auckland City (New Zealand)	1–0	(New Zealand) Wellington Olympic	Auckland, New Zealand
14:00 (UTC+13:00)	Ukich 72'	Report		Stadium: Kiwitea Street; Attendance: 300; Referee: Calvin Berg (New Zealand)

16 March 2024	Wellington Olympic (New Zealand)	3–3 (3–4 agg.)	(New Zealand) Auckland City	Wellington, New Zealand
14:00 (UTC+13:00)	Watson 20', 28'; Randall 23'	Report	Ilich 27'; Murati 48'; Howieson 81'	Stadium: Martin Luckie Park; Attendance: 200; Referee: Campbell-Kirk Kawana-Waugh (New Zealand)

==== Group A ====
Pos	Team	Pld	W	D	L	GF	GA	GD	Pts	Qualification	AUC	REW	HEK	SOL
1	(New Zealand) Auckland City	3	2	1	0	8	2	+6	7	Advance to knockout stage	—	—	1–0	5–0
2	(Fiji) Rewa	3	2	1	0	8	6	+2	7	Advance to knockout stage	2–2	—	—	—
3	(Papua New Guinea) Hekari United	3	1	0	2	4	4	0	3		—	2–3	—	—
4	(Solomon Islands) Solomon Warriors	3	0	0	3	2	10	−8	0		—	2–3	0–2	—

Source: OFC

11 May 2024	Rewa (Fiji)	2–2	(New Zealand) Auckland City	Pā'ea
15:00	Sela 62', 64'	Report	Howieson 50'; De Vries 66'	Stadium: Stade Paea; Attendance: 105; Referee: Médéric Lacour (New Caledonia)

14 May 2024	Auckland City (New Zealand)	1–0	(Papua New Guinea) Hekari United	Pā'ea
15:00	Gillion 90+3'	Report		Stadium: Stade Paea; Attendance: 101; Referee: Tim Danaskos (Australia)

17 May 2024	Auckland City (New Zealand)	5–0	(Solomon Islands) Solomon Warriors	Pā'ea
18:00	Manickum 40', 49', 61' (pen.); Ukich 66' (pen.); De Vries 75'	Report		Stadium: Stade Paea; Attendance: 105; Referee: Médéric Lacour (New Caledonia)

==== Knockout stage ====
22 May 2024	Auckland City (New Zealand)	1–0	(New Caledonia) AS Magenta	Pirae
14:00	Ukich 66'	Report		Stadium: Stade Pater; Attendance: 321; Referee: Norbert Hauata (Tahiti)

===== Final =====
24 May 2024	Auckland City (New Zealand)	4–0	(French Polynesia) Pirae	Pirae
18:00 UTC−10	den Heijer 6'; Gillion 30'; Ukich 48'; Gray 59'	Report		Stadium: Stade Pater; Attendance: 819; Referee: Ben Aukwai (Solomon Islands)

=== OFC Women's Champions League ===
==== Group B ====
Pos	Team	Pld	W	D	L	GF	GA	GD	Pts	Qualification	AUC	LAB	ASA	VEI
1	(New Zealand) Auckland United	3	2	1	0	7	1	+6	7	Advance to semi-finals	—	—	—	1–0
2	(Fiji) Labasa	3	1	2	0	3	1	+2	5	Advance to semi-finals	1–1	—	—	2–0
3	(New Caledonia) AS Academy	3	1	1	1	4	6	−2	4		0–5	0–0	—	—
4	(Tonga) Veitongo	3	0	0	3	1	7	−6	0		—	—	1–4	—

Source: OFC

12 March 2024	Labasa (Fiji)	1–1	(New Zealand) Auckland United	Lawson Tama Stadium, Honiara
15:00 (UTC+11:00)	Kumar 79' (pen.)	Report	Johnson 63'	Attendance: 300; Referee: Shama Maemae (Solomon Islands)

14 March 2024	AS Academy (New Caledonia)	0–5	(New Zealand) Auckland United	National Stadium, Honiara
12:00 (UTC+11:00)		Report	Wasi 4', 45+4', 54'; Brill 88'; Roche 90+2'	Attendance: 100; Referee: Gideon Mamuala (Solomon Islands)

17 March 2024	Auckland United (New Zealand)	1–0	(Tonga) Veitongo	National Stadium, Honiara
12:00 (UTC+11:00)	O'Brien 29'	Report		Attendance: 150; Referee: Gerard Ionatana (Samoa)

==== Knockout stage ====
20 March 2024	Auckland United (New Zealand)	2–1 (a.e.t.)	(Vanuatu) Tafea	National Stadium, Honiara
15:00	Green 10'; Canham 104'	Report	Eramol 82'	Attendance: 350; Referee: Kyllian Lelarge (New Caledonia)

===== Final =====
23 March 2024	Hekari United (Papua New Guinea)	0–1	(New Zealand) Auckland United	National Stadium, Honiara
15:00 UTC+11		Report	Johnson 25'	Attendance: 510; Referee: Torika Delai (Fiji)

== Men's football ==
League	Promoted to league	Relegated from league	Removed
Northern League	East Coast Bays; Tauranga City	Manukau United; Takapuna	None
Central League	Island Bay United	Whanganui Athletic	None
Southern League	University of Canterbury	None	Green Island

=== National League ===
Pos	Team	Pld	W	D	L	GF	GA	GD	Pts	Qualification
1	Birkenhead United	9	6	2	1	23	16	+7	20	Qualification to Grand Final
2	Auckland City (C)	9	6	1	2	20	10	+10	19	Qualification to Grand Final and Champions League group stage
3	Western Springs	9	6	0	3	25	16	+9	18	
4	Napier City Rovers	9	5	2	2	21	14	+7	17	
5	Wellington Phoenix Reserves (Note: Wellington Phoenix Reserves can not qualify for the Grand Final.)	9	4	1	4	16	19	−3	13	
6	Wellington Olympic	9	3	2	4	17	15	+2	11	
7	Coastal Spirit	9	3	2	4	18	20	−2	11	
8	Cashmere Technical	9	2	3	4	16	18	−2	9	
9	Eastern Suburbs	9	1	2	6	8	17	−9	5	
10	Western Suburbs	9	1	1	7	9	28	−19	4	

Source: New Zealand Football
Rules for classification: 1) Points; 2) Goal difference; 3) Goals for; 4) Goals against; 5) Head to head; 6) Disciplinary record
(C) Champions

==== Grand final ====
Sunday, 1 December 2024
16:00 NZDT

Birkenhead United	1–2 (a.e.t.)	Auckland City
Patterson 23'	Report	Jorgensen 44' (o.g.); Kilkolly 111'

North Harbour Stadium, Auckland
Attendance: 4,972
Referee: Calvin Berg

=== Northern League ===
Pos	Team	Pld	W	D	L	GF	GA	GD	Pts	Qualification
1	Auckland City (C)	22	16	3	3	53	21	+32	51	Winner of Northern League and qualification to National League Championship
2	Western Springs	22	14	4	4	52	30	+22	46	Qualification to National League Championship
3	Eastern Suburbs	22	14	2	6	38	20	+18	44	Qualification to National League Championship
4	Birkenhead United	22	13	4	5	54	31	+23	43	Qualification to National League Championship
5	Auckland United	22	12	4	6	39	27	+12	40	
6	Bay Olympic	22	9	1	12	39	42	−3	28	
7	Tauranga City	22	7	4	11	38	56	−18	25	
8	West Coast Rangers	22	6	5	11	28	45	−17	23	
9	East Coast Bays	22	5	7	10	29	38	−9	22	
10	Manurewa (O)	22	5	4	13	41	56	−15	19	Qualification for the relegation play-offs
11	Melville United (R)	22	6	0	16	29	54	−25	18	Relegation to NRFL Championship
12	Hamilton Wanderers (R)	22	2	8	12	28	48	−20	14	Relegation to NRFL Championship

Source: NRF
Rules for classification: 1) Points; 2) Goal difference; 3) Goals scored; 4) Goals against; 5) Head to head; 6) Disciplinary record; 7) Coin toss
(C) Champions; (O) Play-off winners; (R) Relegated

=== Central League ===
Pos	Team	Pld	W	D	L	GF	GA	GD	Pts	Qualification
1	Wellington Olympic (C)	18	17	0	1	79	16	+63	51	Winner of Central League and qualification to National League Championship
2	Western Suburbs	18	13	1	4	54	24	+30	40	Qualification to National League Championship
3	Napier City Rovers	18	13	1	4	53	23	+30	40	Qualification to National League Championship
4	Miramar Rangers	18	11	2	5	61	21	+40	35	
5	Wellington Phoenix Reserves (Note: Wellington Phoenix Reserves gain automatic entry into the National League Championship phase due to the A-League Men requirements.)	18	7	3	8	34	40	−6	24	Qualification to National League Championship
6	Waterside Karori	18	7	3	8	35	48	−13	24	
7	Petone	18	6	3	9	28	45	−17	21	
8	Island Bay United	18	4	0	14	25	64	−39	12	
9	North Wellington	18	2	3	13	23	63	−40	9	
10	Stop Out (R)	18	1	2	15	19	67	−48	5	Relegation to Central League 2

Source: Capital Football
Rules for classification: 1) Points; 2) Goal difference; 3) Goals scored; 4) Goals against; 5) Head to head; 6) Disciplinary record; 7) Coin toss
(C) Champions; (R) Relegated

=== Southern League ===
Pos	Team	Pld	W	D	L	GF	GA	GD	Pts	Qualification
1	Cashmere Technical (C)	18	15	2	1	90	19	+71	47	Winner of Southern League and qualification to National League Championship
2	Coastal Spirit	18	14	3	1	59	17	+42	45	Qualification to National League Championship
3	Christchurch United	18	13	2	3	64	21	+43	41	
4	Nelson Suburbs	17	8	5	4	52	39	+13	29	
5	Ferrymead Bays	18	8	1	9	39	39	0	25	
6	Nomads United	18	7	3	8	27	31	−4	24	
7	Dunedin City Royals	17	6	1	10	27	46	−19	19	
8	Selwyn United	18	4	2	12	31	68	−37	14	
9	University of Canterbury	18	3	2	13	21	46	−25	11	
10	FC Twenty 11 (R)	18	0	1	17	9	93	−84	1	Relegated to Canterbury Premiership

Source: Mainland Football
Rules for classification: 1) Points; 2) Goal difference; 3) Goals scored; 4) Goals against; 5) Head to head; 6) Disciplinary record; 7) Coin toss
(C) Champions; (R) Relegated

=== Cup Competitions ===
==== Chatham Cup ====
===== Final =====
7 September 2024
19:00

Wellington Olympic	1–1	Auckland City
Lobo 77' (o.g.)	Report	Ukich 90+6'
Penalties
Mata (penalty scored); Gulley (penalty scored); Prins (penalty scored); Hoy (penalty scored); Watson (penalty scored)	5–4	(penalty scored) Heijer; (penalty scored) Ukich; (penalty scored) Ilich; (penalty scored) Tieku; (penalty missed) Zhou

North Harbour Stadium, Auckland
Referee: Luke Gardner

==== Charity Cup ====
3 March 2024
13:00 NZDT

Wellington Olympic	3–0	Christchurch United
Mata 33'; Watson 50'; Coustrain 75'	Report

Martin Luckie Park, Wellington
Referee: Cory Mills

== Women's football ==
=== National Women's League ===
Pos	Team	Pld	W	D	L	GF	GA	GD	Pts	Qualification
1	Auckland United (C)	9	8	1	0	21	4	+17	25	Qualification to Grand Final and Women's Champions League group stage
2	CF Waterside Karori	9	5	3	1	18	8	+10	18	Qualification to Grand Final
3	Eastern Suburbs	9	4	2	3	24	9	+15	14	
4	Western Springs	9	4	2	3	22	13	+9	14	
5	West Coast Rangers	9	4	2	3	20	15	+5	14	
6	CF Wellington United	9	3	4	2	19	11	+8	13	
7	Canterbury United Pride	9	4	1	4	17	20	−3	13	
8	Southern United	9	3	2	4	17	12	+5	11	
9	Wellington Phoenix Reserves (Note: Wellington Phoenix Reserves can not qualify for the Grand Final.)	9	1	1	7	9	28	−19	4	
10	Central Football	9	0	0	9	3	50	−47	0	

Source: New Zealand Football
Rules for classification: 1) Points; 2) Goal difference; 3) Goals for; 4) Head to head; 5) Disciplinary record; 6) Coin toss
(C) Champions

==== Grand final ====
Sunday, 1 December 2024
13:00 NZDT

Auckland United	3–1	CF Waterside Karori
Vlok 2'; Roche 12', 52'	Report	Furukawa 53'

North Harbour Stadium, Auckland
Referee: Beth Rattray

=== NRFL Women’s Premiership ===
Pos	Team	Pld	W	D	L	GF	GA	GD	Pts	Qualification
1	Auckland United (C)	21	19	2	0	65	9	+56	59	Winner of NRFL Premiership and qualification to National League Championship
2	West Coast Rangers	21	16	1	4	65	29	+36	49	Qualification to National League Championship
3	Eastern Suburbs	21	10	1	10	39	29	+10	31	Qualification to National League Championship
4	Western Springs	21	9	3	9	38	31	+7	30	Qualification to National League Championship
5	Fencibles United	21	8	2	11	26	41	−15	26	
6	Hibiscus Coast	21	7	3	11	30	44	−14	24	
7	Ellerslie	21	4	4	13	21	48	−27	16	
8	Hamilton Wanderers (R)	21	2	2	17	14	67	−53	8	Relegation to NRFL Women's Championship

Source: Northern Region Football
Rules for classification: 1) Points; 2) Goal difference; 3) Goals scored; 4) Goals against; 5) Head to head; 6) Disciplinary record; 7) Coin toss
(C) Champions; (R) Relegated

=== Cup Competitions ===
==== Kate Sheppard Cup ====
===== Final =====
7 September 2024
16:00

Western Springs	0–1	Auckland United
		Roche 90'

North Harbour Stadium, Auckland
Referee: Sarah Jones

== Deaths ==
- 7 August 2024: Jim Moyes, 77, New Zealand and Huntly Thistle defender.
- 20 August 2024: Malcolm Bland, 75, New Zealand, Gisborne City and Eastern Suburbs forward.
- 18 September 2024: Sam Malcolmson, 77, New Zealand, Wellington United Diamonds, Stop Out, Eastern Suburbs, Manurewa and East Coast Bays defender.

== Retirements ==
- 13 September 2024: Daisy Cleverley, 27, former New Zealand midfielder.
- 16 October 2024: Hannah Wilkinson, 32, former New Zealand forward.

== New clubs ==
- Auckland FC
- FC Tauranga Moana (women's) (Note: After the formation of youth teams in 2023, a women's first team was formed for the 2024 season.)
