= 2023 OFC Champions League qualifying stage =

The 2023 OFC Champions League qualifying stage was played from 18 to 24 February 2023. A total of four teams competed in the qualifying stage to decide the last of the 8 places in the group stage of the 2023 OFC Champions League, in which the hosts Lupe ole Soaga secured that spot by winning all three of their games.

== Preliminary group ==
=== Draw ===
The draw for the qualifying stage was held on 1 February 2023 at the OFC Headquarters in Auckland, New Zealand.

Host team	Remaining teams
(Samoa) Lupe ole Soaga	(American Samoa) Ilaoa and To'omata; (Cook Islands) Tupapa Maraerenga; (Tonga) Veitongo

=== Format ===
The four teams in the qualifying stage played each other on a round-robin basis at a centralised venue. The winners, Lupe ole Soaga, advanced to the group stage to join the 7 direct entrants. The qualifying stage was hosted in Apia by Football Federation Samoa.

=== Matches ===
Pos	Team	Pld	W	D	L	GF	GA	GD	Pts	Qualification	LUP	TUP	VEI	ITO
1	(Samoa) Lupe ole Soaga (H)	3	3	0	0	29	1	+28	9	Advance to group stage	—	7–1	9–0	—
2	(Cook Islands) Tupapa Maraerenga	3	2	0	1	10	7	+3	6		—	—	1–0	8–0
3	(Tonga) Veitongo	2	0	0	2	0	10	−10	0		—	—	—	~~Canc.~~ (Note: The Veitongo v Ilaoa and To'omata match was cancelled due to the threat of a cyclone closing in on Samoa. Both teams were already eliminated prior to the cancellation.)
4	(American Samoa) Ilaoa and To'omata	2	0	0	2	0	21	−21	0		0–13	—	—	—

Source: OFC
(H) Hosts
Notes:
18 February 2023
13:00 (UTC+13:00)

Tupapa Maraerenga (Cook Islands)	1–0	(Tonga) Veitongo
Saghabi 9' (pen.)	Report

National Soccer Stadium, Apia
Attendance: 234
Referee: Arnold Tari (Vanuatu)
18 February 2023
16:00 (UTC+13:00)

Ilaoa and To'omata (American Samoa)	0–13	(Samoa) Lupe ole Soaga
	Report	Taualai 14'; Toni 25', 37'; Tumua Leo 35', 44', 49', 67', 85'; Bolton-Roberts 52'; Mason 71'; Matau 73'; Tumua 82', 89'

National Soccer Stadium, Apia
Attendance: 547
Referee: Neeshil Varman (Fiji)

21 February 2023
13:00 (UTC+13:00)

Tupapa Maraerenga (Cook Islands)	8–0	(American Samoa) Ilaoa and To'omata
McCoy 13', 43'; Porter 22'; Saghabi 32', 39'; Harmon 36' (pen.); Tiputoa 87'; Tuakana 88'	Report

National Soccer Stadium, Apia
Attendance: 106
Referee: Mohammed Altaf (Fiji)
21 February 2023
16:00 (UTC+13:00)

Lupe ole Soaga (Samoa)	9–0	(Tonga) Veitongo
Cunniff 15', 40'; Setefano 20'; Taualai 45+1' (pen.), 66' (pen.); Tumua Leo 63'; Letutusa 70'; Alatina Talilai 80'; Fehoko 86' (o.g.)	Report

National Soccer Stadium, Apia
Attendance: 480
Referee: Ben O'Connell (New Zealand)

24 February 2023
13:00 (UTC+13:00)

Veitongo (Tonga)	Cancelled (Note: The Veitongo v Ilaoa and To'omata match was cancelled due to the threat of a cyclone closing in on Samoa.)	(American Samoa) Ilaoa and To'omata
	Report

National Soccer Stadium, Apia
Referee: Keith Kitumbing (Papua New Guinea)
24 February 2023
16:00 (UTC+13:00)

Lupe ole Soaga (Samoa)	7–1	(Cook Islands) Tupapa Maraerenga
Cunniff 23', 89'; Alatina Talilai 55'; Mason 63'; Letutusa 79'; Tumua Leo 81'; Matau 90'	Report	Trego 87'

National Soccer Stadium, Apia
Attendance: 620
Referee: Arnold Tari (Vanuatu)

== National play-offs ==
On 10 February 2023, OFC announced that 7 sets of national playoffs would take place to determine which side from those nations would take part in this year's Champions League.

Team 1	Agg.	Team 2	1st leg	2nd leg
Suva (Fiji)	3–2	(Fiji) Rewa	1–1	2–1
Hienghène Sport (New Caledonia)	1–5	(New Caledonia) Tiga Sport	1–3	0–2
Wellington Olympic (New Zealand)	4–6	(New Zealand) Auckland City	1–1	3–5
Hekari United (Papua New Guinea)	4–1	(Papua New Guinea) Lae City	2–1	2–0
Kossa FC (Solomon Islands)	2–3	(Solomon Islands) Solomon Warriors	1–1	1–2
Dragon (French Polynesia)	3–9	(French Polynesia) Pirae	0–2	3–7
SiaRaga FC (Vanuatu)	0–4	(Vanuatu) Ifira Black Bird FC	0–3	0–1

23 February 2023
19:00 (UTC+12:00)

Suva (Fiji)	1–1	(Fiji) Rewa
A. Soromon 62'	Report	Nabenia 90+4'

HFC Bank Stadium, Suva
Referee: Veer Singh (Fiji)
26 February 2023
15:00 (UTC+12:00)

Rewa (Fiji)	1–2	(Fiji) Suva
Verevou 90+3'	Report	Tahioa 49'; Matanisiga 80' (o.g.)

HFC Bank Stadium, Suva
Attendance: 850
Referee: Neeshil Varman (Fiji)

Suva won 3–2 on aggregate.

11 February 2023
16:00 (UTC+11:00)

Hienghène Sport (New Caledonia)	1–3	(New Caledonia) Tiga Sport
Sansot 12'	Report	J. Béaruné 5'; Wélépane 18'; D. Béaruné 61'

Stade Numa Daly, Nouméa
Referee: Marius Gaicoin (New Caledonia)
18 February 2023
16:00 (UTC+11:00)

Tiga Sport (New Caledonia)	2–0	(New Caledonia) Hienghène Sport
Mathelon 15'; Wélépane 26'	Report

Stade Numa Daly, Nouméa
Referee: Mederic Lacour (New Caledonia)

Tiga Sport won 5–1 on aggregate.

11 March 2023
14:00 (UTC+13:00)

Wellington Olympic (New Zealand)	1–1	(New Zealand) Auckland City
Stevens 37'	Report	Gray 79'

Martin Luckie Park, Wellington
Attendance: 520
Referee: Nick Waldron (New Zealand)
18 March 2023
16:00 (UTC+13:00)

Auckland City (New Zealand)	5–3	(New Zealand) Wellington Olympic
Gillion 23'; Tade 74', 77' (pen.), 87' (pen.); Kilkolly 85'	Report	Mata 15'; Watson 28', 62'

Kiwitea Street, Auckland
Referee: Campbell-Kirk Kawana-Waugh (New Zealand)

Auckland City won 6–4 on aggregate.

11 February 2023
15:00 (UTC+10:00)

Hekari United (Papua New Guinea)	2–1	(Papua New Guinea) Lae City
Joe 50'; Naime 60'	Report	Morgan 45+5'

Sir Ignatius Kilage Stadium, Lae
Attendance: 2,500
Referee: Charles Aragni (Papua New Guinea)
18 February 2023
15:00 (UTC+10:00)

Lae City (Papua New Guinea)	0–2	(Papua New Guinea) Hekari United
	Report	Yasasa 88'; Joe 90+4'

Sir John Guise Stadium, Port Moresby
Attendance: 2,000
Referee: Veer Singh (Fiji)

Hekari United won 4–1 on aggregate.

22 February 2023
15:00 (UTC+11:00)

Kossa (Solomon Islands)	1–1	(Solomon Islands) Solomon Warriors
Feni 43'	Report	Gagame 54'

Lawson Tama Stadium, Honiara
Referee: Timothy Niu (Solomon Islands)
28 February 2023
15:00 (UTC+11:00)

Solomon Warriors (Solomon Islands)	2–1	(Solomon Islands) Kossa
Ifunaoa 33'; Mala 60'	Report	Bakale 17'

Lawson Tama Stadium, Honiara
Referee: David Yareboinen (Papua New Guinea)

Solomon Warriors won 3–2 on aggregate.

17 February 2023
20:00 (UTC-10:00)

Dragon (French Polynesia)	0–2	(French Polynesia) Pirae
	Report	Labaste 49'; Paama 79'

Stade Pater, Pirae
Referee: Aurelien Planchais-Godefroy (France)
24 February 2023
20:00 (UTC-10:00)

Pirae (French Polynesia)	7–3	(French Polynesia) Dragon
Tetauira 13', 40', 66'; Bourebare 16'; Tihoni 50'; Ngiamba 78'; Mathon 86'	Report	Tinirauarii 73' (pen.), 78'; Chan Kat 90+7'

Stade Pater, Pirae
Referee: Teremoana Roihau (Tahiti)

Pirae won 9–3 on aggregate.

22 February 2023
17:00 (UTC+11:00)

SiaRaga FC (Vanuatu)	0–3	(Vanuatu) Ifira Black Bird FC
	Report	Iawak 55'; Lency 64'; Kalotang 78'

VFF Freshwater Stadium, Port Vila
Attendance: 3,000
Referee: Joel Hopken (Vanuatu)
25 February 2023
14:00 (UTC+11:00)

Ifira Black Bird FC (Vanuatu)	1–0	(Vanuatu) SiaRaga FC
Tenene 2'	Report

Luganville Soccer City Stadium, Luganville
Attendance: 5,000
Referee: Ben Aukwai (Solomon Islands)

Ifira Black Bird won 4–0 on aggregate.
