= 2024 OFC Men's Champions League qualifying stage =

The 2024 OFC Men's Champions League qualifying stage was played from 17 to 23 February 2024. A total of four teams competed in the qualifying stage to decide the last of the 8 places in the group stage of the 2024 OFC Men's Champions League.

== Preliminary group ==
=== Draw ===
The draw for the qualifying stage was held on 17 January 2024 at the OFC Headquarters in Auckland, New Zealand.

=== Format ===
The four teams in the qualifying stage played each other on a round-robin basis at a centralised venue (in Nuku'alofa, Tonga). The winners advanced to the group stage to join the seven winners from the national playoffs.

=== Matches ===
Pos	Team	Pld	W	D	L	GF	GA	GD	Pts	Qualification	VPN	TUP	VEI	RYP
1	(Samoa) Vaivase-Tai FC	3	2	1	0	18	0	+18	7	Advance to group stage	—	4–0	—	—
2	(Cook Islands) Tupapa Maraerenga	3	2	0	1	17	6	+11	6		—	—	3–2	14–0
3	(Tonga) Veitongo (H)	3	1	1	1	15	3	+12	4		0–0	—	—	13–0
4	(American Samoa) Vaiala Tongan	3	0	0	3	0	41	−41	0		0–14	—	—	—

Source: OFC
(H) Hosts
17 February 2024
11:00 (UTC+13:00)

Vaivase-Tai FC (Samoa)	4–0	(Cook Islands) Tupapa Maraerenga
Taualai 16', 43'; Kwan 45'; Tumua 90'	Report

Teufaiva Stadium, Nuku'alofa
Attendance: 350
Referee: Cory Mills (New Zealand)
17 February 2024
16:00 (UTC+13:00)

Veitongo (Tonga)	13–0	(American Samoa) Vaiala Tongan
Uhatahi 11'; Polovili 15'; Kendler 22', 43', 62'; Feke 26', 85'; Lutu 33', 61'; Uhatahi 76', 87', 90+3'; Fifita 77'	Report

Teufaiva Stadium, Nuku'alofa
Attendance: 1,300
Referee: Arnold Tari (Vanuatu)

20 February 2024
11:00 (UTC+13:00)

Tupapa Maraerenga (Cook Islands)	14–0	(American Samoa) Vaiala Tongan
Fuhiniu 1', 82'; Harmon Jr. 4', 16', 31', 45', 45', 73', 75'; Harmon 5'; Connolly 67', 90'; Taokia 79'; Gibbens 84'	Report

Teufaiva Stadium, Nuku'alofa
Attendance: 500
Referee: Neeshil Varman (Fiji)
20 February 2024
16:00 (UTC+13:00)

Veitongo (Tonga)	0–0	(Samoa) Vaivase-Tai FC
	Report

Teufaiva Stadium, Nuku'alofa
Attendance: 1,500
Referee: Timothy Niu (Solomon Islands)

23 February 2024
11:00 (UTC+13:00)

Vaiala Tongan (American Samoa)	0–14	(Samoa) Vaivase-Tai FC
	Report	Tumua 2', 18' (pen.), 46', 66', 80'; Nanumea 13', 14', 45', 48'; Taualai 26', 45+3', 64'; Leiatava 45+6'; Tanielu 90+6'

Teufaiva Stadium, Nuku'alofa
Attendance: 300
Referee: Timothy Niu (Solomon Islands)
23 February 2024
16:00 (UTC+13:00)

Tupapa Maraerenga (Cook Islands)	3–2	(Tonga) Veitongo
Connolly 43' (pen.), 57'; Tairi 63'	Report	Kendler 23', 70'

Teufaiva Stadium, Nuku'alofa
Attendance: 1,000
Referee: Cory Mills (New Zealand)

== National play-offs ==
Seven sets of national playoffs took place to determine which side from those nations would take part in this year's Champions League.

Team 1	Agg.	Team 2	1st leg	2nd leg
Rewa (Fiji)	3–2	(Fiji) Lautoka	0–0	3–2 (a.e.t.)
ASC Gaïca (New Caledonia)	1–2	(New Caledonia) AS Magenta	1–2	0–0
Auckland City (New Zealand)	4–3	(New Zealand) Wellington Olympic	1–0	3–3
Port Moresby Strikers (Papua New Guinea)	0–5	(Papua New Guinea) Hekari United	0–2	0–3
Central Coast (Solomon Islands)	1–2	(Solomon Islands) Solomon Warriors	0–1	1–1
Pirae (French Polynesia)	2–2 (6–5 p)	(French Polynesia) Tefana	1–1	1–1 (a.e.t.)
Classic (Vanuatu)	2–3	(Vanuatu) Ifira Black Bird	1–2	1–1

8 February 2024
15:00 (UTC+12:00)

Rewa (Fiji)	0–0	(Fiji) Lautoka
	Report

Ratu Cakobau Park, Nausori
Attendance: 700
Referee: Neeshil Varman (Fiji)
11 February 2024
15:00 (UTC+12:00)

Lautoka (Fiji)	2–3 (a.e.t.)	(Fiji) Rewa
Waqa 18'; Lairoti 90+9' (pen.)	Report	Kautoga 71'; Hughes 82', 100' (pen.)

Churchill Park, Lautoka
Attendance: 1,000
Referee: Mohammed Altaf (Fiji)

Rewa won 3–2 on aggregate.

17 February 2024
15:00 (UTC+11:00)

ASC Gaïca (New Caledonia)	1–2	(New Caledonia) AS Magenta
Wahiobe 90+10'	Report	Jewine 35'; Watu 65'

Stade Numa Daly, Nouméa
Attendance: 1,000
Referee: Sebastien Pelissier (New Caledonia)
24 February 2024
15:00 (UTC+11:00)

AS Magenta (New Caledonia)	0–0	(New Caledonia) ASC Gaïca
	Report

Stade Numa Daly, Nouméa
Attendance: 1,000
Referee: Mederic Lacour (New Caledonia)

AS Magenta won 2–1 on aggregate.

9 March 2024
14:00 (UTC+13:00)

Auckland City (New Zealand)	1–0	(New Zealand) Wellington Olympic
Ukich 72'	Report

Kiwitea Street, Auckland
Attendance: 300
Referee: Calvin Berg (New Zealand)
16 March 2024
14:00 (UTC+13:00)

Wellington Olympic (New Zealand)	3–3	(New Zealand) Auckland City
Watson 20', 28'; Randall 23'	Report	Ilich 27'; Murati 48'; Howieson 81'

Martin Luckie Park, Wellington
Attendance: 200
Referee: Campbell-Kirk Kawana-Waugh (New Zealand)

Auckland City won 4–3 on aggregate.

10 February 2024
15:00 (UTC+10:00)

Port Moresby Strikers (Papua New Guinea)	0–2	(Papua New Guinea) Hekari United
	Report	Kepo 60'; Yasasa 71'

PNG Football Stadium, Port Moresby
Attendance: 369
Referee: Hillary Ani (Papua New Guinea)
17 February 2024
15:00 (UTC+10:00)

Hekari United (Papua New Guinea)	3–0	(Papua New Guinea) Port Moresby Strikers
Kila 25'; Rani 75'; Joe 90+4' (pen.)	Report

PNG Football Stadium, Port Moresby
Attendance: 279
Referee: Charles Arangi (Papua New Guinea)

Hekari United won 5–0 on aggregate.

17 February 2024
19:00 (UTC+11:00)

Central Coast (Solomon Islands)	0–1	(Solomon Islands) Solomon Warriors
	Report	Feni 5' (pen.)

National Stadium, Honiara
Attendance: 1,817
Referee: Gideon Mamuala (Solomon Islands)
22 February 2024
17:00 (UTC+11:00)

Solomon Warriors (Solomon Islands)	1–1	(Solomon Islands) Central Coast
Feni 67'	Report	Leslie 8'

National Stadium, Honiara
Attendance: 1,647
Referee: Ben Aukwai (Solomon Islands)

Solomon Warriors won 2–1 on aggregate.

12 March 2024
20:00 (UTC-10:00)

Pirae (French Polynesia)	1–1	(French Polynesia) Tefana
Tau 77'	Report	Leon 88'

Stade Pater, Pirae
Attendance: 1,500
Referee: Teremoana Roihau (Tahiti)
15 March 2024
20:00 (UTC-10:00)

Tefana (French Polynesia)	1–1 (a.e.t.)	(French Polynesia) Pirae
Kaspard 104'	Report	Labaste 120+1'
Penalties
	5–6

Stade Pater, Pirae
Attendance: 2,500
Referee: Norbert Hauata (Tahiti)

2–2 on aggregate. Pirae won 6–5 on penalties.

24 February 2024
14:00 (UTC+11:00)

Classic (Vanuatu)	1–2	(Vanuatu) Ifira Black Bird
Ollie 49'	Report	Kalotang 28'; Wohale 45+2'

Luganville Soccer City Stadium, Luganville
Attendance: 2,050
Referee: Jarethy George (Vanuatu)
28 February 2024
16:00 (UTC+11:00)

Ifira Black Bird (Vanuatu)	1−1	(Vanuatu) Classic
Spokeyjack 29'	Report	Toata 42'

VFF Freshwater Stadium, Port Vila
Attendance: 3,500
Referee: Arnold Tari (Vanuatu)

Ifira Black Bird won 3–2 on aggregate.
