= 2024 OFC Men's Champions League =

Tournament details
- Host country: Tahiti (final tournament)
- Dates: Qualifying: 8 February – 16 March; Competition proper: 11–24 May
- Teams: Competition proper: 8 Total: 18 (from 11 associations)

Final positions
- Champions: (New Zealand) Auckland City (12th title)
- Runners-up: (French Polynesia) Pirae

Tournament statistics
- Matches played: 15
- Goals scored: 62 (4.13 per match)
- Attendance: 3,491 (233 per match)
- Top scorer(s): (New Caledonia) Germain Haewegene (5 goals) (AS Magenta)
- Best player(s): (New Zealand) Liam Gillion (Auckland City FC)
- Best goalkeeper: (New Zealand) Conor Tracey (Auckland City FC)
- Fair play award: (New Zealand) Auckland City

The 2024 OFC Men's Champions League was the 22rd edition of the Oceanian club championship. Organized by the Oceania Football Confederation (OFC), it is Oceania's premier club football tournament. This was the first season under the current OFC Men's Champions League name.

The tournament winner qualified for the 2024 FIFA Intercontinental Cup. By winning the 2022 OFC Champions League and the 2023 OFC Champions League, Auckland City earned the right to play at the 2025 FIFA Club World Cup in the United States before even playing the 2024 OFC Men's Champions League.

== Teams ==
A total of 18 teams from all 11 OFC member associations may enter the competition.

- Seven associations (Fiji, New Caledonia, New Zealand, Papua New Guinea, Solomon Islands, Tahiti, Vanuatu) are awarded one berth each in the group stage, after playing a national playoff between the top-two clubs in their league.
- Four associations (American Samoa, Cook Islands, Samoa, Tonga) are awarded one berth each in the qualifying stage, with the winners advancing to the group stage.
Location of teams of the 2024 OFC Men's Champions League.
Teams entering the National playoffs
Teams entering the qualifying stage; (h) Qualifying stage host

Qualified teams for 2024 OFC Men's Champions League
| Entry round | | Teams | | | |
|---|---|---|---|---|---|
| Qualifying stage | NP | (Fiji) Lautoka (CW) | (Fiji) Rewa (2nd) | (New Caledonia) AS Magenta (1st) | (New Caledonia) ASC Gaïca (2nd) |
| Qualifying stage | NP | (New Zealand) Wellington Olympic (CW) | (New Zealand) Auckland City (2nd) | (Papua New Guinea) Hekari United (CW) | (Papua New Guinea) Port Moresby Strikers (2nd) |
| Qualifying stage | NP | (Solomon Islands) Solomon Warriors (CW) | (Solomon Islands) Central Coast (2nd) | (French Polynesia) A.S. Tefana (CW) | (French Polynesia) Pirae (2nd) |
| Qualifying stage | NP | (Vanuatu) Ifira Black Bird (CW) | (Vanuatu) Classic FC (2nd) | | |
| Qualifying stage | PR | (American Samoa) Vaiala Tonga (6th) | (Cook Islands) Tupapa Maraerenga (CW) | (Samoa) Vaivase-Tai (3rd) | (Tonga) Veitongo (CW) |

== Schedule ==
Schedule for 2024 OFC Men's Champions League
| Phase | Round | Draw date | First leg | Second leg |
|---|---|---|---|---|
| Qualifying stage | Preliminary group (Tonga) | 17 January | 17 February | |
| Qualifying stage | Preliminary group (Tonga) | 17 January | 20 February | |
| Qualifying stage | Preliminary group (Tonga) | 17 January | 23 February | |
| Qualifying stage | National Play-off | 17 January | 8 February – 12 March | 11 February – 16 March |
| Group stage | Matchday 1 | 17 January | 11–12 & 20 May | |
| Group stage | Matchday 2 | 17 January | 14–16 May | |
| Group stage | Matchday 3 | 17 January | 17–18 May | |
| Knockout phase | Semi-finals | 17 January | 22 May | |
| Knockout phase | Final | 17 January | 24 May | |

== Qualifying stage ==
=== Preliminary group ===
The draw for the qualifying stage was held on 17 January 2024 at the OFC Headquarters in Auckland, New Zealand. The four teams in the qualifying stage played each other on a round-robin basis at a centralised venue (in Nuku'alofa, Tonga). The winners advanced to the group stage to join the seven winners from the national playoffs.

| Pos | Team | Pld | W | D | L | GF | GA | GD | Pts | Qualification | VPN | TUP | VEI | RYP |
|---|---|---|---|---|---|---|---|---|---|---|---|---|---|---|
| 1 | (Samoa) Vaivase-Tai FC | 3 | 2 | 1 | 0 | 18 | 0 | +18 | 7 | Advance to Group stage | — | 4–0 | — | — |
| 2 | (Cook Islands) Tupapa Maraerenga | 3 | 2 | 0 | 1 | 17 | 6 | +11 | 6 | | — | — | 3–2 | 14–0 |
| 3 | (Tonga) Veitongo (H) | 3 | 1 | 1 | 1 | 15 | 3 | +12 | 4 | | 0–0 | — | — | 13–0 |
| 4 | (American Samoa) Vaiala Tongan | 3 | 0 | 0 | 3 | 0 | 41 | −41 | 0 | | 0–14 | — | — | — |

Source: OFC
(H) Hosts

=== National play-offs ===
Seven sets of national playoffs took place to determine which side from those nations would take part in this year's Champions League.

| Team 1 | Agg. | Team 2 | 1st leg | 2nd leg |
|---|---|---|---|---|
| Rewa (Fiji) | 3–2 | (Fiji) Lautoka | 0–0 | 3–2 (a.e.t.) |
| ASC Gaïca (New Caledonia) | 1–2 | (New Caledonia) AS Magenta | 1–2 | 0–0 |
| Auckland City (New Zealand) | 4–3 | (New Zealand) Wellington Olympic | 1–0 | 3–3 |
| Port Moresby Strikers (Papua New Guinea) | 0–5 | (Papua New Guinea) Hekari United | 0–2 | 0–3 |
| Central Coast (Solomon Islands) | 1–2 | (Solomon Islands) Solomon Warriors | 0–1 | 1–1 |
| Pirae (French Polynesia) | 2–2 (6–5 p) | (French Polynesia) Tefana | 1–1 | 1–1 (a.e.t.) |
| Classic (Vanuatu) | 2–3 | (Vanuatu) Ifira Black Bird | 1–2 | 1–1 |

== Final tournament ==
=== Qualified teams ===
| Teams qualified from the National playoff (Note: The identity of the National playoff winners was not known at the time of the final draw) | Teams qualified from the qualifying round |
|---|---|
| (Fiji) Rewa; (New Caledonia) AS Magenta; (New Zealand) Auckland City; (Papua New Guinea) Hekari United; (Solomon Islands) Solomon Warriors; (French Polynesia) Pirae; (Vanuatu) Ifira Black Bird | (Samoa) Vaivase-Tai FC (Note: The identity of the qualifying winners was not known at the time of the final draw) |

=== Draw result ===
Group A
| Pos | Team |
|---|---|
| A1 | (Solomon Islands) Solomon Warriors |
| A2 | (Papua New Guinea) Hekari United |
| A3 | (Fiji) Rewa |
| A4 | (New Zealand) Auckland City |

Group B
| Pos | Team |
|---|---|
| B1 | (French Polynesia) Pirae |
| B2 | (Samoa) Vaivase-Tai FC |
| B3 | (Vanuatu) Ifira Black Bird |
| B4 | (New Caledonia) AS Magenta |

=== Venues ===
Final tournament venues being played in Tahiti in two host cities in Pirae and Pāʻea.

Tahiti
| Pirae | Pāʻea |
|---|---|
| Stade Pater Te Hono Nui | Stade Paea |
| Capacity: 11,700 | Capacity: 10,000 |
2024 OFC Men's Champions League is located in French Polynesia

== Group stage ==
The group stage matches took place in Tahiti between 11 and 20 May 2024.

=== Group A ===
| Pos | Team | Pld | W | D | L | GF | GA | GD | Pts | Qualification | AUC | REW | HEK | SOL |
|---|---|---|---|---|---|---|---|---|---|---|---|---|---|---|
| 1 | (New Zealand) Auckland City | 3 | 2 | 1 | 0 | 8 | 2 | +6 | 7 | Advance to Knockout stage | — | — | 1–0 | 5–0 |
| 2 | (Fiji) Rewa | 3 | 2 | 1 | 0 | 8 | 6 | +2 | 7 | Advance to Knockout stage | 2–2 | — | — | — |
| 3 | (Papua New Guinea) Hekari United | 3 | 1 | 0 | 2 | 4 | 4 | 0 | 3 | | — | 2–3 | — | — |
| 4 | (Solomon Islands) Solomon Warriors | 3 | 0 | 0 | 3 | 2 | 10 | −8 | 0 | | — | 2–3 | 0–2 | — |

Source: OFC

=== Group B ===
| Pos | Team | Pld | W | D | L | GF | GA | GD | Pts | Qualification | PIR | MAG | IFI | VPN |
|---|---|---|---|---|---|---|---|---|---|---|---|---|---|---|
| 1 | (French Polynesia) Pirae (H) | 3 | 2 | 1 | 0 | 11 | 1 | +10 | 7 | Advance to Knockout stage | — | — | 5–1 | 6–0 |
| 2 | (New Caledonia) AS Magenta | 3 | 2 | 1 | 0 | 10 | 1 | +9 | 7 | Advance to Knockout stage | 0–0 | — | — | 8–0 |
| 3 | (Vanuatu) Ifira Black Bird | 3 | 1 | 0 | 2 | 7 | 8 | −1 | 3 | | — | 1–2 | — | — |
| 4 | (Samoa) Vaivase-Tai FC | 3 | 0 | 0 | 3 | 1 | 19 | −18 | 0 | | — | — | 1–5 | — |

Source: OFC
(H) Hosts

== Knockout stage ==
The four teams in the knockout stage played on a single-elimination basis, with each tie played as a single match at Stade Pater.

=== Bracket ===
Semi-finals
22 May – Pirae
(New Zealand Football) Auckland City | 1
(New Caledonian Football Federation) Magenta | 0
22 May – Pirae
(Tahitian Football Federation) Pirae (a.e.t.) | 4
(Fiji Football Association) Rewa | 2

Final
24 May – Pirae
(New Zealand Football) Auckland City | 4
(Tahitian Football Federation) Pirae | 0

=== Semi-finals ===
| Team 1 | Score | Team 2 |
|---|---|---|
| Auckland City (New Zealand) | 1–0 | (New Caledonia) AS Magenta |
| Pirae (French Polynesia) | 4–2 (a.e.t.) | (Fiji) Rewa |

=== Final ===
In the final, the two semi-final winners played against each other. The final was played on 24 May 2024.

24 May 2024
18:00 UTC−10

| Auckland City (New Zealand) | 4–0 | (French Polynesia) Pirae |
|---|---|---|
| den Heijer 6'; Gillion 30'; Ukich 48'; Gray 59' | Report |

Stade Pater, Pirae
Attendance: 819
Referee: Ben Aukwai (Solomon Islands)

== Statistics ==
=== Top goalscorers ===
| Rank | Player | Team | Goals |
|---|---|---|---|
| 1 | (New Caledonia) Germain Haewegene | (New Caledonia) Magenta | 5 |
| 2 | (French Polynesia) Ariiura Labaste | (French Polynesia) Pirae | 4 |
| 3 | (New Zealand) Dylan Manickum | (New Zealand) Auckland City | 3 |
| 3 | (Fiji) Josaia Sela | (Fiji) Rewa | 3 |
| 3 | (Fiji) Samuela Kautoga | (Fiji) Rewa | 3 |
| 6 | (Solomon Islands) Gagame Feni | (Solomon Islands) Solomon Warriors | 2 |
| 6 | (Vanuatu) Jonathan Spokeyjack | (Vanuatu) Ifira Black Bird | 2 |
| 6 | (New Zealand) Ryan De Vries | (New Zealand) Auckland City | 2 |
| 6 | (French Polynesia) Sandro Tau | (French Polynesia) Pirae | 2 |
| 6 | (French Polynesia) Yohann Tihoni | (French Polynesia) Pirae | 2 |

== Awards ==
| Award | Winner | Team |
|---|---|---|
| Golden Ball | (New Zealand) Liam Gillion | (New Zealand) Auckland City FC |
| Golden Boot | (New Caledonia) Germain Haewegene | (New Caledonia) AS Magenta |
| Golden Glove | (New Zealand) Conor Tracey | (New Zealand) Auckland City FC |
| Fair Play Award | —N/a | (New Zealand) Auckland City FC |

== Qualification to 2025 FIFA Club World Cup ==
On 17 December 2023 FIFA confirmed the sporting criteria for the four-year ranking used to determine the OFC representative in the 2025 FIFA Club World Cup, awarding 3 points for a win, one point for a draw, and three points for "advanced phase" in the Confederations primary club competition. On the same day, FIFA confirmed Auckland City as the OFC representative. As champions of the previous two iterations of the OFC Champions League, there was no mathematical possibility for Auckland City to be overtaken by another club during the 2024 OFC Men's Champions League.

The four-year rankings is as follows:

Qualification for the 2025 FIFA Club World Cup
| Rank | Club | TP | CP | MP |
|---|---|---|---|---|
| 1 | (New Zealand) Auckland City | 66 | 27 | 39 |
| 2 | (French Polynesia) AS Pirae | 31 | 15 | 16 |
| 3 | (Fiji) Rewa | 20 | 9 | 11 |
| 4 | (French Polynesia) AS Vénus | 18 | 9 | 9 |
| 5 | (Fiji) Suva | 17 | 9 | 8 |
| 5 | (Vanuatu) Ifira Black Bird | 17 | 9 | 8 |
| 7 | (New Caledonia) AS Magenta | 13 | 6 | 7 |
| 8 | (Solomon Islands) Central Coast | 12 | 6 | 6 |
| 8 | (New Caledonia) Hienghène Sport | 12 | 6 | 6 |
| 8 | (Papua New Guinea) Hekari United | 12 | 6 | 6 |
| 11 | (Solomon Islands) Solomon Warriors | 9 | 6 | 3 |
| 12 | (Vanuatu) Galaxy | 7 | 3 | 4 |
| 13 | (New Caledonia) Tiga Sport | 6 | 3 | 3 |
| 14 | (Papua New Guinea) Lae City | 4 | 3 | 1 |
| 15 | (Samoa) Vaivase-Tai | 3 | 3 | 0 |
| 15 | (Cook Islands) Nikao Sokattak | 3 | 3 | 0 |
| 15 | (Samoa) Lupe o le Soaga SC | 3 | 3 | 0 |

== See also ==
- 2024 OFC Women's Champions League
