= Michael Tumua Leo =

Samoa soccer player (born 2003)

Personal information
- Full name: John Michael Tumua Leo
- Date of birth: 15 January 2003 (age 23)
- Place of birth: Alofi, Niue
- Positions: Midfielder; forward

Team information
- Current team: Lupe o le Soaga
- Number: 13

Senior career*
Years	Team	Apps	(Gls)
2018–2022	Vaipuna		
2020	→ Lupe o le Soaga (loan)		
2023–	Lupe o le Soaga	22	(45)

International career^{‡}
2018	Samoa U17	6	(2)
2019–	Samoa U23	3	(3)
2023–	Samoa	3	(5)
- * Club domestic league appearances and goals as of 16:01, 6 December 2023 (UTC) ‡ National team caps and goals as of 16:01, 6 December 2023 (UTC)

John Michael Tumua Leo (born 15 January 2003) is a Samoan association footballer who plays as a forward for Lupe o le Soaga and the Samoa national team.

== Club career ==
Tumua Leo played for Vaipuna SC of the Samoa National League since at least 2018. In 2020, he briefly joined Lupe o le Soaga for the club's 2020 OFC Champions League campaign. Tumua Leo finished the 2021 season with forty-five league goals for Vaipuna as the club finished as runners up to Lupe o le Soaga. After remaining with Vaipuna SC for the 2022 season, the player made a permanent move to Lupe o le Soaga SC in 2023. Soon thereafter he competed with the club in Qualifying Stage of the 2023 OFC Champions League. In the club's opening match, Tumua Leo score fived goals in a 13–0 victory over American Samoa representative Ilaoa and To'omata. He went on to score against Veitongo of Tonga and Tupapa Maraerenga of the Cook Islands en route to qualifying for the Group Stage.

== International career ==
As a youth, Tumua Leo represented Samoa in the 2018 OFC U-16 Championship. In the tournament, he scored a brace against American Samoa in the Qualifying Stage. In 2019, he was a member of the national under-23 team that competed in the 2019 OFC Men's Olympic Qualifying Tournament. He scored against eventual winners New Zealand and another two goals against American Samoa in the Group Stage.

In 2019, Tumua Leo was called up to the senior national team for the first time for the 2019 Pacific Games. He would go on to make his senior debut at the 2023 edition of the tournament, earning his first cap on 17 November in a 0–1 defeat to the hosts Solomon Islands. Three days later, he scored five goals in a 10–0 victory over American Samoa.

== Career statistics ==
=== International ===
Appearances and goals by national team and year
National team	Year	Apps	Goals
Samoa	2023	3	5
Samoa	2024	3	0
Total		6	5

Scores and results list Samoa's goal tally first, score column indicates score after each Tumua Leo goal.

List of international goals scored by Michael Tumua Leo
No.	Date	Venue	Opponent	Score	Result	Competition	Ref.
1	20 November 2023	Lawson Tama Stadium, Honiara, Solomon Islands	American Samoa	2–0	10–0	2023 Pacific Games	
2	20 November 2023	Lawson Tama Stadium, Honiara, Solomon Islands	American Samoa	4–0	10–0	2023 Pacific Games	
3	20 November 2023	Lawson Tama Stadium, Honiara, Solomon Islands	American Samoa	6–0	10–0	2023 Pacific Games	
4	20 November 2023	Lawson Tama Stadium, Honiara, Solomon Islands	American Samoa	9–0	10–0	2023 Pacific Games	
5	20 November 2023	Lawson Tama Stadium, Honiara, Solomon Islands	American Samoa	10–0	10–0	2023 Pacific Games	
