= 2023 OFC Champions League knockout stage =

The 2023 OFC Champions League knockout stage was played from 24 to 27 May 2023. A total of four teams competed in the knockout stage to decide the champions of the 2023 OFC Champions League.

== Qualified teams ==
The winners and runners-up of each of the two groups in the group stage advanced to the semi-finals.

Group	Winners	Runners-up
A	(New Zealand Football) Auckland City	(Fiji Football Association) Suva FC
B	(Tahitian Football Federation) Pirae	(Vanuatu Football Federation) Ifira Black Bird

== Format ==
The four teams in the knockout stage played on a single-elimination basis, with each tie played as a single match at VFF Freshwater Stadium.

== Schedule ==
The schedule of each round was as follows.

Round	Match dates
Semi-finals	24 May 2023
Final	27 May 2023 at VFF Freshwater Stadium, Port Vila

== Bracket ==
The bracket was determined as follows:

Semi-finals
24 May 2023
(New Zealand Football) Auckland City (p)	2 (5)
(Vanuatu Football Federation) Ifira Black Bird	2 (4)
24 May 2023
(Tahitian Football Federation) Pirae	2
(Fiji Football Association) Suva (a.e.t.)	4

Final
27 May 2023
(New Zealand Football) Auckland City (a.e.t.)	4
(Fiji Football Association) Suva	2

== Semi-finals ==
Team 1	Score	Team 2
Auckland City (New Zealand)	2–2 (5–4 p)	(Vanuatu) Ifira Black Bird
Pirae (French Polynesia)	2–4 (a.e.t.)	(Fiji) Suva

24 May 2023
11:30

Auckland City (New Zealand)	2–2 (a.e.t.)	(Vanuatu Football Federation) Ifira Black Bird
De Vries 68', 90+5'	Report	Iawak 39'; Tenene 60'
Penalties
den Heijer (penalty scored); Zhou (penalty scored); Kilkolly (penalty scored); Howieson (penalty scored); Vale (penalty scored)	5–4	(penalty scored) Taiwia; (penalty scored) Tenene; (penalty scored) Welwel; (penalty scored) Tasip; (penalty missed) Napakaurana

VFF Freshwater Stadium, Port Vila
Attendance: 5,780
Referee: Ben Aukwai (Solomon Islands)

24 May 2023
15:00

Pirae (Tahitian Football Federation)	2–4 (a.e.t.)	(Fiji) Suva
Tetauira 55'; Labaste 89'	Report	Nabenu 14'; Soromon 47', 105+1'; Nand 116'

VFF Freshwater Stadium, Port Vila
Attendance: 3,740
Referee: David Yareboinen (Papua New Guinea)

== Final ==
In the final, the two semi-final winners played against each other. The final was played on 27 May 2023.

27 May 2023
14:00 UTC+11

Auckland City (New Zealand)	4–2 (a.e.t.)	(Fiji) Suva
Kilkolly 34' (pen.); De Vries 45+3', 120+4'; Howieson 109'	Report	Saniel 66'; Tahioa 83'

VFF Freshwater Stadium, Port Vila
Attendance: 5,420
Referee: David Yareboinen (Papua New Guinea)
