= 2024 OFC Men's Champions League group stage =

The 2024 OFC Men's Champions League group stage was played from 11 to 20 May 2024. A total of 8 teams competed in the group stage to decide the four places in the knockout stage of the 2024 OFC Men's Champions League.

== Draw ==
The draw of the group stage took place at OFC Home of Football in Auckland, New Zealand on 17 January 2024. The 8 teams were drawn into two groups of four. None of the teams were known at the time of the draw.

National playoff winners	Preliminary group winner
(Fiji) Rewa; (New Caledonia) AS Magenta; (New Zealand) Auckland City; (Papua New Guinea) Hekari United; (Solomon Islands) Solomon Warriors; (French Polynesia) Pirae; (Vanuatu) Ifira Black Bird	(Samoa) Vaivase-Tai FC

== Format ==
The four teams in each group played each other on a round-robin basis at two centralised venues in Tahiti. The winners and runners-up of each group advanced to the semi-finals of the knockout stage.

== Schedule ==
Originally, each group was scheduled to host their matchdays on the same day, however flight cancellations for Ifira Black Bird meant the schedule was changed twice to accommodate all their matches. The final schedule for each matchday is shown below:

Matchday	Dates		Matches
Matchday	Group A	Group B	Matches
Matchday 1	11 May 2024	12 and 20 May 2024	Team 1 vs. Team 2, Team 3 vs. Team 4
Matchday 2	14 May 2024	15 and 16 May 2024	Team 1 vs. Team 3, Team 4 vs. Team 2
Matchday 3	17 May 2024	18 May 2024	Team 4 vs. Team 1, Team 2 vs. Team 3

== Groups ==
=== Group A ===
All times are local, TAH (UTC-10).

Pos	Team	Pld	W	D	L	GF	GA	GD	Pts	Qualification	AUC	REW	HEK	SOL
1	(New Zealand) Auckland City	3	2	1	0	8	2	+6	7	Advance to knockout stage	—	—	1–0	5–0
2	(Fiji) Rewa	3	2	1	0	8	6	+2	7	Advance to knockout stage	2–2	—	—	—
3	(Papua New Guinea) Hekari United	3	1	0	2	4	4	0	3		—	2–3	—	—
4	(Solomon Islands) Solomon Warriors	3	0	0	3	2	10	−8	0		—	2–3	0–2	—

Source: OFC
11 May 2024
12:00

Rewa (Fiji)	2–2	(New Zealand) Auckland City
Sela 62', 64'	Report	Howieson 50'; De Vries 66'

Stade Paea, Pāʻea
Attendance: 105
Referee: Médéric Lacour (New Caledonia)
11 May 2024
15:00

Solomon Warriors (Solomon Islands)	0–2	(Papua New Guinea) Hekari United
	Report	Kepo 70'; Naime 82'

Stade Paea, Pāʻea
Attendance: 150
Referee: Norbert Hauata (Tahiti)

14 May 2024
12:00

Auckland City (New Zealand)	1–0	(Papua New Guinea) Hekari United
Gillion 90+3'	Report

Stade Paea, Pāʻea
Attendance: 101
Referee: Tim Danaskos (Australia)
14 May 2024
15:00

Solomon Warriors (Solomon Islands)	2–3	(Fiji) Rewa
Feni 15', 72'	Report	Hughes 40'; Kautoga 45'; Sela 70'

Stade Paea, Pāʻea
Attendance: 102
Referee: Lachlan Keevers (Australia)

17 May 2024
12:00

Hekari United (Papua New Guinea)	2–3	(Fiji) Rewa
Joe 55' (pen.); Rani 62'	Report	Kautoga 41', 74'; Waranaivalu 90'

Stade Paea, Pāʻea
Attendance: 101
Referee: Tim Danaskos (Australia)
17 May 2024
15:00

Auckland City (New Zealand)	5–0	(Solomon Islands) Solomon Warriors
Manickum 40', 49', 61' (pen.); Ukich 66' (pen.); De Vries 75'	Report

Stade Paea, Pāʻea
Attendance: 105
Referee: Médéric Lacour (New Caledonia)

=== Group B ===
All times are local, TAH (UTC-10).

Pos	Team	Pld	W	D	L	GF	GA	GD	Pts	Qualification	PIR	MAG	IFI	VPN
1	(French Polynesia) Pirae (H)	3	2	1	0	11	1	+10	7	Advance to knockout stage	—	—	5–1	6–0
2	(New Caledonia) AS Magenta	3	2	1	0	10	1	+9	7	Advance to knockout stage	0–0	—	—	8–0
3	(Vanuatu) Ifira Black Bird	3	1	0	2	7	8	−1	3		—	1–2	—	—
4	(Samoa) Vaivase-Tai FC	3	0	0	3	1	19	−18	0		—	—	1–5	—

Source: OFC
(H) Hosts
12 May 2024
18:00

Pirae (French Polynesia)	6–0	(Samoa) Vaivase-Tai FC
Tau 9'; Tepa 41'; Labaste 47', 73' (pen.); Ngiamba 67'; Tihoni 83'	Report

Stade Pater, Pirae
Attendance: 288
Referee: Ben Aukwai (Solomon Islands)
20 May 2024
15:00

Ifira Black Bird (Vanuatu)	1–2	(New Caledonia) AS Magenta
Walone 43' (o.g.)	Report	Wanemut 39' (o.g.); Luepak 90+1'

Stade Pater, Pirae
Attendance: 178
Referee: Ben Aukwai (Solomon Islands)

15 May 2024
15:00

AS Magenta (New Caledonia)	8–0	(Samoa) Vaivase-Tai FC
Haewegene 9', 12', 37', 45', 48'; Gope 45'; Kugogne 51'; Brunet 87'	Report

Stade Pater, Pirae
Attendance: 82
Referee: Veer Singh (Fiji)
16 May 2024
18:00

Pirae (French Polynesia)	5–1	(Vanuatu) Ifira Black Bird
Tihoni 10'; Tave 14'; Labaste 52', 63'; Tau 72'	Report	Iawak 27'

Stade Pater, Pirae
Attendance: 335
Referee: Matthew Conger (New Zealand)

18 May 2024
15:00

Vaivase-Tai FC (Samoa)	1–5	(Vanuatu) Ifira Black Bird
Leiataua 55'	Report	Spokeyjack 8', 28'; Kalotang 20'; Tenene 22'; Thomas 87'

Stade Pater, Pirae
Attendance: 204
Referee: David Yareboinen (Papua New Guinea)
18 May 2024
18:00

AS Magenta (New Caledonia)	0–0	(French Polynesia) Pirae
	Report

Stade Pater, Pirae
Attendance: 200
Referee: Matthew Conger (New Zealand)
