= 2023 OFC Champions League group stage =

The 2023 OFC Champions League group stage was played from 14 to 21 May 2023. A total of 8 teams competed in the group stage to decide the four places in the knockout stage of the 2023 OFC Champions League.

== Draw ==
The draw of the group stage were announced by the OFC on 23 March 2023. The 8 teams were drawn into two groups of four. Ifira Black Bird were pre-determined to play in Port Vila and so were automatically drawn into group B.

National playoff winners	Preliminary group winner
(Fiji) Suva; (New Caledonia) Tiga Sport; (New Zealand) Auckland City; (Papua New Guinea) Hekari United; (Solomon Islands) Solomon Warriors; (French Polynesia) Pirae; (Vanuatu) Ifira Black Bird	(Samoa) Lupe ole Soaga

== Format ==
The four teams in each group played each other on a round-robin basis at two centralised venues in Vanuatu. The winners and runners-up of each group advanced to the semi-finals of the knockout stage.

== Schedule ==
Matches were played on the following dates and venues:

- Group matches were played between 14–21 May 2023 in Vanuatu.

The schedule of each matchday was as follows.

Matchday	Dates		Matches
Matchday	Group A	Group B	Matches
Matchday 1	14 May 2023	15 May 2023	Team 1 vs. Team 2, Team 3 vs. Team 4
Matchday 2	17 May 2023	18 May 2023	Team 1 vs. Team 3, Team 4 vs. Team 2
Matchday 3	20 May 2023	21 May 2023	Team 4 vs. Team 1, Team 2 vs. Team 3

== Groups ==
=== Group A ===
All times were local, VUT (UTC+11).

Pos	Team	Pld	W	D	L	GF	GA	GD	Pts	Qualification	AUC	SUV	SOL	LUP
1	(New Zealand) Auckland City	3	3	0	0	9	2	+7	9	Knockout stage	—	—	3–1	—
2	(Fiji) Suva	3	2	0	1	6	3	+3	6	Knockout stage	1–3	—	—	3–0 (Note: The Lupe ole Soaga v Suva match was cancelled due to injuries in the Lupe ole Soaga squad. Lupe ole Soaga SC will have all its matches cancelled and considered null and void. OFC will award victory and the resultant three points to the opposing team as well as the score of 3–0.)
3	(Solomon Islands) Solomon Warriors	3	1	0	2	4	5	−1	3		—	0–2	—	3–0 (Note: The Lupe ole Soaga v Solomon Warriors match was cancelled due to injuries in the Lupe ole Soaga squad. Lupe ole Soaga SC will have all its matches cancelled and considered null and void. OFC will award victory and the resultant three points to the opposing team as well as the score of 3–0.)
4	(Samoa) Lupe ole Soaga	3	0	0	3	0	9	−9	0		0–3 (Note: The Lupe ole Soaga v Auckland City match was cancelled due to injuries in the Lupe ole Soaga squad. Lupe ole Soaga SC will have all its matches cancelled and considered null and void. OFC will award victory and the resultant three points to the opposing team as well as the score of 3–0.)	—	—	—

Source: OFC
Notes:
14 May 2023
12:00

Auckland City (New Zealand)	3–1	(Solomon Islands) Solomon Warriors
Kilkolly 55' (pen.); Garriga 77'; de Vries 81'	Report	Tigi 9'

Luganville Soccer City Stadium, Luganville
Attendance: 5,000
Referee: Norbert Hauata (Tahiti)
14 May 2023
15:00

Suva (Fiji)	6–0	(Samoa) Lupe ole Soaga
Soromon 31'; Saniel 35'; Apelu 42' (o.g.); Tahioa 63'; Matarerega 69', 89'	Report

Luganville Soccer City Stadium, Luganville
Attendance: 3,000
Referee: Teremoana Roihau (Tahiti)

17 May 2023
12:00

Solomon Warriors (Solomon Islands)	3–1	(Samoa) Lupe ole Soaga
Ifunaoa 15', 67'; Mala 36'	Report	Siba 63'

Luganville Soccer City Stadium, Luganville
Attendance: 3,000
Referee: Teremoana Roihau (Tahiti)
17 May 2023
15:00

Suva (Fiji)	1–3	(New Zealand) Auckland City
Saniel 71'	Report	Gillion 14', 55'; Garriga 34'

Luganville Soccer City Stadium, Luganville
Attendance: 5,500
Referee: David Yareboinen (Papua New Guinea)

20 May 2023
12:00

Lupe ole Soaga (Samoa)	0–3 (Note: The Lupe ole Soaga v Auckland City match was cancelled due to injuries in the Lupe ole Soaga squad. Lupe ole Soaga SC will have all its matches cancelled and considered null and void. OFC will award victory and the resultant three points to the opposing team as well as the score of 3-0.)	(New Zealand) Auckland City
	Report

Luganville Soccer City Stadium, Luganville
Referee: Arnold Tari (Vanuatu)
20 May 2023
15:00

Solomon Warriors (Solomon Islands)	0–2	(Fiji) Suva
	Report	Soromon 16'; Drudru 70'

Luganville Soccer City Stadium, Luganville
Attendance: 8,000
Referee: David Yareboinen (Papua New Guinea)

=== Group B ===
All times were local, VUT (UTC+11).

Pos	Team	Pld	W	D	L	GF	GA	GD	Pts	Qualification	PIR	IFI	HEK	TIG
1	(French Polynesia) Pirae	3	2	1	0	7	3	+4	7	Knockout stage	—	—	—	3–0
2	(Vanuatu) Ifira Black Bird (H)	3	1	1	1	3	4	−1	4	Knockout stage	2–2	—	0–2	—
3	(Papua New Guinea) Hekari United	3	1	0	2	3	3	0	3		1–2	—	—	—
4	(New Caledonia) Tiga Sport	3	1	0	2	1	4	−3	3		—	0–1	1–0	—

Source: OFC
(H) Hosts
15 May 2023
12:00

Pirae (French Polynesia)	3–0	(New Caledonia) Tiga Sport
Tihoni 7'; Teumere 25'; Labaste 40'	Report

VFF Freshwater Stadium, Port Vila
Attendance: 5,576
Referee: Ben Aukwai (Solomon Islands)
15 May 2023
15:00

Ifira Black Bird (Vanuatu)	0–2	(Papua New Guinea) Hekari United
	Report	Yasasa 58'; Naime 82'

VFF Freshwater Stadium, Port Vila
Attendance: 5,576
Referee: Kavitesh Behari (Fiji)

18 May 2023
12:00

Tiga Sport (New Caledonia)	1–0	(Papua New Guinea) Hekari United
Welepane 68'	Report

VFF Freshwater Stadium, Port Vila
Attendance: 5,777
Referee: Kavitesh Behari (Fiji)
18 May 2023
15:00

Ifira Black Bird (Vanuatu)	2–2	(French Polynesia) Pirae
Wohale 43'; Kaloros 58'	Report	Pito 84'; Labaste 90+5'

VFF Freshwater Stadium, Port Vila
Attendance: 5,777
Referee: Anna-Marie Keighley (New Zealand)

21 May 2023
12:00

Hekari United (Papua New Guinea)	1–2	(French Polynesia) Pirae
Joe 55' (pen.)	Report	Tave 45+1'; Tihoni 63'

VFF Freshwater Stadium, Port Vila
Attendance: 4,252
Referee: Anna-Marie Keighley (New Zealand)
21 May 2023
15:00

Tiga Sport (New Caledonia)	0–1	(Vanuatu) Ifira Black Bird
	Report	Tenene 18'

VFF Freshwater Stadium, Port Vila
Attendance: 4,252
Referee: Ben Aukwai (Solomon Islands)
