= 2024 OFC Men's Champions League knockout stage =

The 2024 OFC Men's Champions League knockout stage was played from 22 to 24 May 2024. A total of four teams competed in the knockout stage to decide the champions of the 2024 OFC Men's Champions League.

All times are local, TAH (UTC-10).

== Qualified teams ==
The winners and runners-up of each of the two groups in the group stage advanced to the semi-finals.

| Group | Winners | Runners-up |
|---|---|---|
| A | (New Zealand Football) Auckland City | (Fiji Football Association) Rewa |
| B | (Tahitian Football Federation) Pirae | (New Caledonian Football Federation) AS Magenta |

== Format ==
The four teams in the knockout stage played on a single-elimination basis, with each tie played as a single match at Stade Pater. The winner of the tie earned them a spot in the 2024 FIFA Intercontinental Cup, in a "FIFA African–Asian–Pacific Cup play-off".

== Schedule ==
The schedule of each round is as follows.

| Round | Match dates |
|---|---|
| Semi-finals | 22 May 2024 |
| Final | 24 May 2024 at Stade Pater, Pirae |

== Bracket ==
Semi-finals
22 May – Pirae
(New Zealand Football) Auckland City | 1
(New Caledonian Football Federation) Magenta | 0
22 May – Pirae
(Tahitian Football Federation) Pirae (a.e.t.) | 4
(Fiji Football Association) Rewa | 2

Final
24 May – Pirae
(New Zealand Football) Auckland City | 4
(Tahitian Football Federation) Pirae | 0

== Semi-finals ==
| Team 1 | Score | Team 2 |
|---|---|---|
| Auckland City (New Zealand) | 1–0 | (New Caledonia) AS Magenta |
| Pirae (French Polynesia) | 4–2 (a.e.t.) | (Fiji) Rewa |

22 May 2024
14:00

| Auckland City (New Zealand) | 1–0 | (New Caledonia) AS Magenta |
|---|---|---|
| Ukich 66' | Report |

Stade Pater, Pirae
Attendance: 321
Referee: Norbert Hauata (Tahiti)

22 May 2024
18:00

| Pirae (French Polynesia) | 4–2 (a.e.t.) | (Fiji) Rewa |
|---|---|---|
| Ngiamba 90' (pen.), 90+6' (pen.); Tepa 98'; Drova 111' (o.g.) | Report | Joseph 35' (pen.); Kautoga 90+9' |

Stade Pater, Pirae
Attendance: 400
Referee: Matthew Conger (New Zealand)

== Final ==
In the final, the two semi-final winners played against each other. The final was played on 24 May 2024.

24 May 2024
18:00 UTC−10

| Auckland City (New Zealand) | 4–0 | (French Polynesia) Pirae |
|---|---|---|
| den Heijer 6'; Gillion 30'; Ukich 48'; Gray 59' | Report |

Stade Pater, Pirae
Attendance: 819
Referee: Ben Aukwai (Solomon Islands)
