= Eugenie Tatuava =

Cook Islands footballer

Personal information
- Full name: Eugenie Tatuava
- Date of birth: 18 September 1984 (age 42)
- Place of birth: Cook Islands
- Position: Forward

Team information
- Current team: Tupapa Maraerenga

Youth career
- 2003: Auckland Grammar School

Senior career*
| Years | Team | Apps | (Gls) |
| 2003– | Tupapa Maraerenga | | |

International career^{‡}
| 2004– | Cook Islands | 8 | (0) |
- * Club domestic league appearances and goals as of 29 July 2013 ‡ National team caps and goals as of 29 July 2013

Eugenie Tatuava (born 18 September 1984) in the Cook Islands is a footballer who plays as a forward. He currently plays for Tupapa Maraerenga in the Cook Islands Round Cup and the Cook Islands national football team.
