= 2023 OFC Champions League =

Tournament details
- Host country: Group stage: Vanuatu
- Dates: Qualifying: 11 February – 18 March; Competition proper: 14 – 27 May
- Teams: Total: 18 (from 11 associations)

Final positions
- Champions: (New Zealand) Auckland City (11th title)
- Runners-up: (Fiji) Suva

Tournament statistics
- Matches played: 14
- Goals scored: 50 (3.57 per match)
- Attendance: 70,650 (5,046 per match)
- Top scorer(s): (New Zealand) Ryan De Vries (5 goals)

The 2023 OFC Champions League was the 21nd edition of the Oceanian Club Championship, Oceania's premier club football tournament organized by the Oceania Football Confederation (OFC), and the 17th and last season under the name OFC Champions League.

Defending champions Auckland City FC, defeated Fijian Suva to win a record eleventh title and earned the right to play at the 2023 FIFA Club World Cup in Saudi Arabia. As they also won the 2021 OFC Champions League and the 2022 OFC Champions League, they also earned the right to play at the 2025 FIFA Club World Cup in the United States.

== Teams ==
A total of 18 teams from all 11 OFC member associations may enter the competition.

- The seven associations (Fiji, New Caledonia, New Zealand, Papua New Guinea, Solomon Islands, Tahiti, Vanuatu) are awarded a berth each in the groups stage, after playing a national playoff between the top 2 clubs in the league.
- The four associations (American Samoa, Cook Islands, Samoa, Tonga) are awarded one berth each in the qualifying stage, with the winners advancing to the group stage.
Location of teams of the 2023 OFC Champions League.
Teams entering the National playoffs; (H) Group stage host
Teams entering the qualifying stage; (h) Qualifying stage host

Association	Team	Qualifying method
Teams entering the National playoffs
Fiji	Rewa	2022 Fiji National Football League champions
Fiji	Suva	2022 Fiji National Football League runners-up
New Caledonia	AS Tiga Sport	2022 New Caledonia Super Ligue champions
New Caledonia	Hienghène Sport	2022 New Caledonia Super Ligue runners-up
(New Zealand) New Zealand	Auckland City	2022 New Zealand National League grand final champions
(New Zealand) New Zealand	Wellington Olympic	2022 New Zealand National League grand final runners-up
(Papua New Guinea) Papua New Guinea	Lae City	2022 Papua New Guinea National Soccer League champions
(Papua New Guinea) Papua New Guinea	Hekari United	2022 Papua New Guinea National Soccer League runners-up
(Solomon Islands) Solomon Islands	Solomon Warriors	2022–23 Solomon Islands S-League champions
(Solomon Islands) Solomon Islands	Kossa	2022–23 Solomon Islands S-League runners-up
(French Polynesia) Tahiti	AS Pirae	2021–22 Tahiti Ligue 1 champions
(French Polynesia) Tahiti	AS Dragon	2021–22 Tahiti Ligue 1 runners-up
Vanuatu	Ifira Black Bird F.C.	2022 VFF National Super League grand final champions
Vanuatu	Sia-Raga F.C.	2022 VFF National Super League grand final runners-up
Teams entering the qualifying stage
American Samoa	Ilaoa and To'omata	2022 FFAS Senior League champions
Cook Islands	Tupapa Maraerenga	2022 Cook Islands Round Cup champions
Samoa	Lupe ole Soaga	2022 Samoa National League third place
Tonga	Veitongo	2022 Tonga Major League champions

== Qualifying stage ==
=== Preliminary group ===
The draw for the qualifying stage was held on 1 February 2023 at the OFC Headquarters in Auckland, New Zealand. The four teams in the qualifying stage played each other on a round-robin basis at a centralised venue. The winners, Lupe ole Soaga, advanced to the group stage to join the 7 direct entrants. The qualifying stage was hosted in Apia by Football Federation Samoa.

Pos	Team	Pld	W	D	L	GF	GA	GD	Pts	Qualification	LUP	TUP	VEI	ITO
1	(Samoa) Lupe ole Soaga (H)	3	3	0	0	29	1	+28	9	Group stage	—	7–1	9–0	—
2	(Cook Islands) Tupapa Maraerenga	3	2	0	1	10	7	+3	6		—	—	1–0	8–0
3	(Tonga) Veitongo	2	0	0	2	0	10	−10	0		—	—	—	~~Canc.~~ (Note: The Veitongo v Ilaoa and To'omata match was cancelled due to the threat of a cyclone closing in on Samoa. Both teams were already eliminated prior to the cancellation.)
4	(American Samoa) Ilaoa and To'omata	2	0	0	2	0	21	−21	0		0–13	—	—	—

Source: OFC
(H) Hosts

=== National play-offs ===
On 10 February 2023, OFC announced that 7 sets of national playoffs would take place to determine which side from those nations would take part in this year's Champions League.

Team 1	Agg.	Team 2	1st leg	2nd leg
Suva (Fiji)	3–2	(Fiji) Rewa	1–1	2–1
Hienghène Sport (New Caledonia)	1–5	(New Caledonia) Tiga Sport	1–3	0–2
Wellington Olympic (New Zealand)	4–6	(New Zealand) Auckland City	1–1	3–5
Hekari United (Papua New Guinea)	4–1	(Papua New Guinea) Lae City	2–1	2–0
Kossa FC (Solomon Islands)	2–3	(Solomon Islands) Solomon Warriors	1–1	1–2
Dragon (French Polynesia)	3–9	(French Polynesia) Pirae	0–2	3–7
SiaRaga FC (Vanuatu)	0–4	(Vanuatu) Ifira Black Bird FC	0–3	0–1

== Group stage ==
The four teams in each group will play each other on a round-robin basis at a centralised venue in Vanuatu. The winners and runners-up of each group will advance to the semi-finals of the knockout stage.

The draw of the group stage were announced by the OFC on 23 March 2023. The 8 teams were drawn into two groups of four. Ifira Black Bird were pre-determined to play in Port Vila and so were automatically drawn into group B.

=== Group A ===
Pos	Team	Pld	W	D	L	GF	GA	GD	Pts	Qualification	AUC	SUV	SOL	LUP
1	(New Zealand) Auckland City	3	3	0	0	9	2	+7	9	Knockout stage	—	—	3–1	—
2	(Fiji) Suva	3	2	0	1	6	3	+3	6	Knockout stage	1–3	—	—	3–0 (Note: The Lupe ole Soaga v Suva match was cancelled due to injuries in the Lupe ole Soaga squad. Lupe ole Soaga SC will have all its matches cancelled and considered null and void. OFC will award victory and the resultant three points to the opposing team as well as the score of 3–0.)
3	(Solomon Islands) Solomon Warriors	3	1	0	2	4	5	−1	3		—	0–2	—	3–0 (Note: The Lupe ole Soaga v Solomon Warriors match was cancelled due to injuries in the Lupe ole Soaga squad. Lupe ole Soaga SC will have all its matches cancelled and considered null and void. OFC will award victory and the resultant three points to the opposing team as well as the score of 3–0.)
4	(Samoa) Lupe ole Soaga	3	0	0	3	0	9	−9	0		0–3 (Note: The Lupe ole Soaga v Auckland City match was cancelled due to injuries in the Lupe ole Soaga squad. Lupe ole Soaga SC will have all its matches cancelled and considered null and void. OFC will award victory and the resultant three points to the opposing team as well as the score of 3–0.)	—	—	—

Source: OFC

=== Group B ===
Pos	Team	Pld	W	D	L	GF	GA	GD	Pts	Qualification	PIR	IFI	HEK	TIG
1	(French Polynesia) Pirae	3	2	1	0	7	3	+4	7	Knockout stage	—	—	—	3–0
2	(Vanuatu) Ifira Black Bird (H)	3	1	1	1	3	4	−1	4	Knockout stage	2–2	—	0–2	—
3	(Papua New Guinea) Hekari United	3	1	0	2	3	3	0	3		1–2	—	—	—
4	(New Caledonia) Tiga Sport	3	1	0	2	1	4	−3	3		—	0–1	1–0	—

Source: OFC
(H) Hosts

== Knockout stage ==
The four teams in the knockout stage played on a single-elimination basis, with each tie played as a single match at VFF Freshwater Stadium.

=== Bracket ===
The bracket was determined as follows:

Semi-finals
24 May 2023
(New Zealand Football) Auckland City (p)	2 (5)
(Vanuatu Football Federation) Ifira Black Bird	2 (4)
24 May 2023
(Tahitian Football Federation) Pirae	2
(Fiji Football Association) Suva (a.e.t.)	4

Final
27 May 2023
(New Zealand Football) Auckland City (a.e.t.)	4
(Fiji Football Association) Suva	2

=== Semi-finals ===
Team 1	Score	Team 2
Auckland City (New Zealand)	2–2 (5–4 p)	(Vanuatu) Ifira Black Bird
Pirae (French Polynesia)	2–4 (a.e.t.)	(Fiji) Suva

=== Final ===
In the final, the two semi-final winners played against each other. The final was played on 27 May 2023.

27 May 2023
14:00 UTC+11

Auckland City (New Zealand)	4–2 (a.e.t.)	(Fiji) Suva
Kilkolly 34' (pen.); De Vries 45+3', 120+4'; Howieson 109'	Report	Saniel 66'; Tahioa 83'

VFF Freshwater Stadium, Port Vila
Attendance: 5,420
Referee: David Yareboinen (Papua New Guinea)

== Statistics ==
=== Top goalscorers ===
Rank	Player	Team	Goals
1	(Samoa) Michael Tumua Leo	(Samoa) Lupe ole Soaga	7
2	(New Zealand) Ryan De Vries	(New Zealand) Auckland City	5
2	(Vanuatu) Azariah Soromon	(Fiji) Suva	5
4	(French Polynesia) Tamatoa Tetauira	(French Polynesia) Pirae	4
5	(New Zealand) Liam Gillion	(New Zealand) Auckland City	3
5	(New Zealand) Angus Kilkolly	(New Zealand) Auckland City	3
5	(Argentina) Emiliano Tade	(New Zealand) Auckland City	3
5	(Fiji) Marlon Tahioa	(Fiji) Suva	3
5	(Fiji) Alex Saniel	(Fiji) Suva	3
5	(French Polynesia) Ariiura Labaste	(French Polynesia) Pirae	3
5	(Vanuatu) Godine Tenene	(Vanuatu) Ifira Black Bird	3
12	(Vanuatu) Kenny Iawak	(Vanuatu) Ifira Black Bird	2
12	(Papua New Guinea) Joseph Joe	(Papua New Guinea) Hekari United	2
12	(Papua New Guinea) Joe Naime	(Papua New Guinea) Hekari United	2
12	(Fiji) Rusiate Matarerega	(Fiji) Suva	2
12	(French Polynesia) Yohann Tihoni	(French Polynesia) Pirae	2
12	(French Polynesia) Roonui Tinirauarii	(French Polynesia) Dragon	2
12	(New Zealand) Hamish Watson	(New Zealand) Wellington Olimpic	2
12	(New Caledonia) Shene Wélépane	(New Caledonia) Tiga Sport	2
12	(Papua New Guinea) Yagi Yasasa	(Papua New Guinea) Hekari United	2

== Awards ==
Award	Winner
Golden Ball	(New Zealand) Cameron Howieson
Golden Boot	(New Zealand) Ryan de Vries
