= Epeli Lairoti =

Fijian footballer

Personal information
- Full name: Epeli Lairoti
- Date of birth: 3 June 1995 (age 31)
- Place of birth: Fiji
- Positions: Defender; midfielder

Team information
- Current team: Suva

Youth career
- –2012: Ba

Senior career*
Years	Team	Apps	(Gls)
2012–2015	Ba		
2015–	Suva		

International career
2017–	Fiji	1	(0)
Medal record
Men's football
Representing Fiji
Pacific Games
Bronze medal – third place	2023 Solomon Islands
- * Club domestic league appearances and goals

Epeli Lairoti, sometimes spelled Leiroti, (born 3 June 1995) is a Fijian footballer who plays as a defender or midfielder for Fijian club Suva and the Fiji national team.

== Club career ==
Lairoti started his career with Ba. After failing to break into the first team he moved Suva in 2015

== National team ==
In 2017 Lairoti was called up by coach Christophe Gamel for the Fiji national football team. He made his debut on September 2, 2017, in a 0–0 draw against Indonesia. He came in for Narendra Rao in the 90th minute of play.

In 2023 he was called up again by Robert Sherman for the national team in preparation for the 2023 Pacific Games.

== Honours ==
Fiji

- Pacific Games: Bronze Medalist, 2023
