= Toru Mateariki =

Cook Islands footballer (born 2002)

Personal information
- Full name: Ngatokotoru Mateariki
- Date of birth: 27 June 2002 (age 24)
- Place of birth: Rarotonga, Cook Islands
- Height: 1.82 m (6 ft 0 in)
- Position: Forward

Team information
- Current team: Al-Huda

Youth career
- 2016–2017: Nikao Sokattak

Senior career*
Years	Team	Apps	(Gls)
2018–2024	Nikao Sokattak		
2025–	Al-Huda		

International career^{‡}
2017–2018	Cook Islands U17	3	(1)
2022–	Cook Islands	1	(0)
- * Club domestic league appearances and goals as of 13:31, 17 March 2022 (UTC) ‡ National team caps and goals as of 13:31, 17 March 2022 (UTC)

Toru Mateariki (born 27 June 2002) is a Cook Islands footballer who currently plays for Nikao Sokattak and the Cook Islands national team.

== Club career ==
Mateariki played for Nikao Sokattak since at least 2016. That year he scored in the final of the under-17 league to win the title. By 2018 he was playing with the first team in the top flight. In 2021 he scored against Tupapa Maraerenga in both the Round Cup and Cook Islands Cup finals to secure the titles. The team also won the latter tournament in 2020.

== International ==
Mateariki was part of the Cook Islands squad chosen for the 2017 OFC U-17 Championship. However, he remained as an unused substitute over the team's three matches. He was selected again for the 2018 OFC U-16 Championship. He converted a penalty against American Samoa for his team's only goal of the tournament.

In March 2022 Mateariki was included in the Cook Islands senior squad for 2022 FIFA World Cup qualification. He went on to make his senior international debut on 17 March 2022 as a starter in the opening match against the Solomon Islands.

=== International career statistics ===
As of match played 17 March 2022

Cook Islands
Year	Apps	Goals
2022	1	0
Total	1	0

== Personal ==
He is the brother of fellow footballer Tamaiva Mateariki.
