= Benjamin Rairoa =

Cook Islands footballer

Personal information
- Full name: Benjamin Rairoa
- Date of birth: 26 November 1974 (age 51)
- Place of birth: Cook Islands
- Position: Defender

Team information
- Current team: Avatiu

Senior career*
| Years | Team | Apps | (Gls) |
| 1995–???? | Avatiu | | |

International career^{‡}
| 1996–2015 | Cook Islands | 8 | (0) |
- * Club domestic league appearances and goals as of 31 July 2013 ‡ National team caps and goals as of 31 July 2013

Benjamin Rairoa (born 26 November 1974) in the Cook Islands is a footballer who plays as a defender. He currently plays for Avatiu in the Cook Islands Round Cup and the Cook Islands national football team.
