= Gichin Fuhiniu =

Cook Islands footballer

Personal information
- Full name: Gichin Fuhiniu
- Date of birth: 20 August 1988 (age 38)
- Place of birth: Auckland, New Zealand
- Position: Midfielder

Team information
- Current team: Western Springs Masters 35

Senior career*
Years	Team	Apps	(Gls)
2014–2020	Manukau City		
2020–	Western Springs		
2023	→ Tupapa Maraerenga (loan)		
2024–	Western Springs M35		

International career^{‡}
2011–	Cook Islands	6	(0)
- * Club domestic league appearances and goals ‡ National team caps and goals as of 10 September 2015

Gichin Fuhiniu (born 20 August 1988) is a Cook Islands footballer who plays as a midfielder for Manukau City and the Cook Islands national football team. In August 2011 he was selected as part of the football team for the 2011 Pacific Games. He made his debut for the national team on 22 November 2011 in a 3–2 loss against Samoa.

In October 2017 Fuhiniu participated in the "Raro Rumble" charity boxing event, losing to Tamatoa Hunter.

In a match against Vaiala Tonga SC in the 2024 OFC Champions League qualifying stage he scored a brace, one of which being a bicycle kick. The final score was 14-0.
