= Vaiola Tiere =

Cook Islands footballer

Personal information
- Full name: Vaiola Tiere
- Date of birth: 25 July 1977 (age 49)
- Place of birth: Cook Islands
- Position: Goalkeeper

Team information
- Current team: Titikaveka

Senior career*
Years	Team	Apps	(Gls)
1995–	Titikaveka		

International career^{‡}
1996–98	Cook Islands	4	(0)
- * Club domestic league appearances and goals as of 29 July 2013 ‡ National team caps and goals as of 29 July 2013

Vaiola Tiere (born 25 July 1977) in the Cook Islands is a footballer who plays as a goalkeeper. He currently plays for Titikaveka in the Cook Islands Round Cup and the Cook Islands national football team.
