= Samuela Kautoga =

Fijian footballer

Personal information
- Full name: Samuela Ibo Kautoga
- Date of birth: 3 February 1987 (age 39)
- Position: Defender

Team information
- Current team: Rewa
- Number: 18

Senior career*
Years	Team	Apps	(Gls)
2006–2011	Labasa		
2011–2012	Hekari United		
2012–2015	Amicale		
2015–2016	Lautoka		
2016–2017	Ba		
2017–	Rewa	10	(2)
2017	Kasavu		
2019	Kasavu		
2019	Western Springs		
2019–2020	Rewa		
2020–	Western Springs		

International career^{‡}
2007–2017	Fiji	16	(1)
Medal record
Men's football
Representing Fiji
OFC Nations Cup
Third place	2008 Oceania
OFC U-20 Championship
Runner-up	2007 New Zealand
- * Club domestic league appearances and goals ‡ National team caps and goals as of 11 June 2017

Samuela Kautoga is a Fijian footballer who lives in New Zealand and plays as a defender for Manukau United.

== Career statistics ==
As of match played 4 June 2017
Scores and results list Fiji's goal tally first, score column indicates score after each Kautoga goal.

List of international goals scored by Samuela Kautoga
No.	Date	Venue	Cap	Opponent	Score	Result	Competition
1	4 June 2016	Sir John Guise Stadium, Port Moresby, Papua New Guinea	13	Vanuatu	1–2	2–3	2016 OFC Nations Cup

== Honours ==
=== Player ===
Fiji

- OFC Nations Cup: 3rd place, 2008

Fiji U20

- OFC U-20 Championship: Runner-Up, 2007

=== Individual ===
- 2017 Fiji Football Association Cup Tournament Player of the Tournament
