= David Yareboinen =

Papua New Guinean soccer referee

- Full name: David Yareboinen
- Born: 1991 or 1992 (age 34–35); Goroka, Eastern Highlands Province, Papua New Guinea

Domestic
Years	League	Role
2012–present	Papua New Guinea Premier Soccer League	Referee

International
Years	League	Role
2013–present	FIFA	Assistant referee Referee
2013–present	OFC	Referee

David Yareboinen (born 1991 or 1992) is a soccer referee from Papua New Guinea who has been FIFA-listed international referee since 2013, and who is the only FIFA central referee from the country as of 2025.

Between 2013 and 2017, Yareboinen was listed as a FIFA assistant referee, and got promoted in 2017 as a central referee.

== Career ==
Yareboinen is the fifth of six children and was born in Goroka, in the Eastern Highlands Province of Papua New Guinea. His father is a native of Milne Bay Province, while his mother hails from East Sepik Province. Since 2012, Yareboinen has mostly lived in Port Moresby after he got an elite training course from the Papua New Guinea Football Association (PNGFA), whose officials saw his potential and decided that Yareboinen did not need to make the basic course in Goroka.

After successfully completing the course in Port Moresby, the PNGFA nominated him for FIFA status, which was granted in 2013 in the position of assistant referee. After four years of refereeing matches at the local Premier Soccer League, he was promoted as a FIFA-listed referee in 2017.

Since his designation as a central referee, Yareboinen has led matches in two OFC Men's Olympic Qualifying Tournaments, which qualifies teams of the confederation for the Summer Olympics. He oversaw games in the editions of 2019 and 2023. He has also officiated in World Cup qualifiers, refereeing a single match between the Cook Islands and the Solomon Islands at the Al Arabi Stadium in Doha, Qatar, for the confederation's pool for the 2022 FIFA World Cup. Other OFC tournaments for Yareboinen include the 2024 edition of the OFC Men's Nations Cup in Vanuatu.

Among Yareboinen's most important matches are the Gold medal match at the 2019 Pacific Games in Samoa, where he refereed the final between New Zealand U-23 and New Caledonia, as well as the final at the 2023 OFC Champions League between Auckland City FC and Suva F.C. He also led matches of the men's tournament at the 2017 Pacific Mini Games in Vanuatu, which crowned the locals as the champions. Yareboinen's latest performance at the Pacific Games were at the men's tournament of the 2023 edition. In 2023, Yareboinen was appointed for the OFC U-17 Championship and, in 2024, he led games at the OFC U-19 Men's Championship, and at the OFC U-16 Men's Championship.

Outside OFC tournaments, Yareboinen's most prominent roles were at the 2019 FIFA U-20 World Cup in Poland, where he served as a support referee for the confederation's representative Abdelkader Zitouni of Tahiti, and an international university soccer tournament in China.

In an interview to a local magazine in Papua New Guinea, Yareboinen said that while Papuan New Guinean referees have reached international competitions, the national team is far from reaching any important tournament due to low quality of local football, comparing the country's football level with the better quality of Australia and New Zealand. He also urged the national team's players to put more effort in their training to "raise [our] flag in the outskirts."

== Selected record ==
OFC Men's Olympic Qualifying Tournament
Date	Match	Result	Round
24 September 2019	New Zealand – American Samoa	12–0	Group stage – 2019 Fiji
2 October 2019	New Zealand – Fiji	6–1	Semifinal – 2019 Fiji
3 September 2023	Tonga – Solomon Islands	1–5	Group stage – 2023 New Zealand
2019 FIFA U-20 World Cup – Poland
Date	Match	Result	Round
25 May 2019	Portugal – South Korea	1–0	Group stage (as support referee)
