= Sandro Tau =

Tahitian footballer (born 1997)

Personal information
- Full name: Sandro Manu Tau
- Date of birth: 30 April 1997 (age 29)
- Place of birth: Tahiti
- Position: Midfielder

Team information
- Current team: AS Pirae
- Number: 14

Senior career*
Years	Team	Apps	(Gls)
2015–2017	AS Tiare Tahiti		
2017–	AS Pirae	128	(143)

International career
2016	Tahiti U20	2	(1)
2018–	Tahiti	8	(2)
- * Club domestic league appearances and goals

Sandro Tau (born 30 April 1997) is a Tahitian footballer who plays as a midfielder for Tahitian club AS Pirae and the Tahiti national team.

== Club career ==
Tau started his career in the youth of AS Tiare Tahiti. In 2015 he moved to the first team and made his debut. In 2017 he moved to Tahitian powerhouse AS Pirae.

== International career ==
In 2018 Tau was called up by Naea Bennett for the Tahiti national football team to play two friendly games against New Caledonia. He made his debut on March 21, 2017, in a 0–0 draw against New Caledonia when he enter the field in the 70th minute of play, replacing Yohann Tihoni.

== Career statistics ==
=== Club ===
As of 25 May 2024

Club	Season	League			Cup		Continental		Others		Total	
Club	Season	Division	Apps	Goals	Apps	Goals	Apps	Goals	Apps	Goals	Apps	Goals
Pirae	2017-18	Tahiti Ligue 1	23	25	1	1					24	26
Pirae	2018-19	Tahiti Ligue 1	26	30	2	2					28	32
Pirae	2019-20	Tahiti Ligue 1	15	21	2	1					17	22
Pirae	2020-21	Tahiti Ligue 1	16	18	2	1					18	19
Pirae	2021-22	Tahiti Ligue 1	19	17			1	0			20	17
Pirae	2022-23	Tahiti Ligue 1	12	7	3	4	6	0			21	11
Pirae	2023-24	Tahiti Ligue 1	17	25	4	2	5	2			26	29
Pirae	Total		128	143	14	11	12	2			154	156
