= Azariah Soromon =

Ni-Vanuatu footballer

Personal information
- Full name: Azariah Kenneth Soromon
- Date of birth: 1 March 1999 (age 27)
- Place of birth: Vanuatu
- Height: 1.73 m (5 ft 8 in)
- Position: Forward

Team information
- Current team: Vanuatu United
- Number: 13

Youth career
- –2015: Teouma Academy

Senior career*
Years	Team	Apps	(Gls)
2015–2018	Tupuji Imere		
2018	Nalkutan		
2018–2019	Southern United	6	(2)
2019–2020	Malampa Revivors		
2020–2021	Tupuji Imere		
2021–2023	Suva	37	(14)
2024–2025	Western Strikers		
2026–	Vanuatu United FC	4	(0)

International career^{‡}
2017–	Vanuatu U20	2	(0)
2017–	Vanuatu	26	(10)
Medal record
Men's football
Representing Vanuatu
Pacific Mini Games
Gold medal – first place	2017 Vanuatu
MSG Prime Minister's Cup
Runner-up	2026 Fiji
Third place	2023 New Caledonia
- * Club domestic league appearances and goals as of 2 December 2023 ‡ National team caps and goals as of 1 December 2023

Azariah Soromon (born 1 March 1999) is a Ni-Vanuatu footballer who plays as a forward for Vanuatu club Vanuatu United and the Vanuatu national team.

== Club career ==
Soromon started his career in the national Teouma Academy. In 2015 he joined his hometown club Tupuji Imere. In January 2018 he moved to Nalkutan to play for them in the 2018 OFC Champions League. In September 2018, Soromon joined New Zealand Football Championship side Southern United FC. He made his league debut for the club on 26 January 2019 in a 0–0 draw with Team Wellington, coming on as an 89th-minute substitute for Abdulla Al-Kasily.

In 2021 he played for Suva.

== National team ==
In 2017 Soromon was called up for the Vanuatu national football team. He made his debut on 23 November 2017, in a 1–0 loss against Estonia. He came on in the 66 minute of play for Tony Kaltack. He scored his first senior international goal on 2 December 2017 in a 2–1 victory over New Caledonia at the 2017 Pacific Mini Games.

== Private life ==
Two family members of Azariah play for the Vanuatu women's national football team: Brenda Anis and Emilia Taravaki.

== Career statistics ==
=== International ===
As of match played 1 December 2023

Appearances and goals by national team and year
National team	Year	Apps	Goals
Vanuatu	2017	6	6
Vanuatu	2018	2	1
Vanuatu	2019	6	0
Vanuatu	2022	2	0
Vanuatu	2023	10	3
Total		26	10

Scores and results list Vanuatu's goal tally first, score column indicates score after each Soromon goal.

List of international goals scored by Azariah Soromon
No.	Date	Venue	Opponent	Score	Result	Competition	Ref.
1	2 December 2017	Port Vila Municipal Stadium, Port Vila, Vanuatu	New Caledonia	2–1	2–1	2017 Pacific Mini Games	
2	6 December 2017	Korman Stadium, Port Vila, Vanuatu	Tonga	2–0	5–0	2017 Pacific Mini Games	
3	6 December 2017	Korman Stadium, Port Vila, Vanuatu	Tonga	3–0	5–0	2017 Pacific Mini Games	
4	9 December 2017	Port Vila Municipal Stadium, Port Vila, Vanuatu	Fiji	1–1	1–1	2017 Pacific Mini Games	
5	12 December 2017	Port Vila Municipal Stadium, Port Vila, Vanuatu	Tuvalu	5–0	10–0	2017 Pacific Mini Games	
6	12 December 2017	Port Vila Municipal Stadium, Port Vila, Vanuatu	Tuvalu	8–0	10–0	2017 Pacific Mini Games	
7	17 November 2018	Korman Stadium, Port Vila, Vanuatu	New Caledonia	–	2–2	Friendly	
8	23 November 2023	Lawson Tama Stadium, Honiara, Solomon Islands	Papua New Guinea	1–1	1–1	2023 Pacific Games	
9	1 December 2023	Lawson Tama Stadium, Honiara, Solomon Islands	Fiji	1–1	2–4	2023 Pacific Games	
10	1 December 2023	Lawson Tama Stadium, Honiara, Solomon Islands	Fiji	2–1	2–4	2023 Pacific Games	
11	9 June 2026	Freshwater Stadium, Port Vila, Vanuatu	Fiji	1–1	2–2	Friendly	
12	27 September 2026	HFC Bank Stadium, Suva, Fiji	New Caledonia	4–1	4–1	2026 MSG Prime Minister's Cup	

== Honours ==
Vanuatu

- Pacific Mini Games: Gold Medalist, 2017
- MSG Prime Minister's Cup: Runner-Up, 2026; 3rd place 2023
