= Liam Gillion =

New Zealand footballer (born 2002)

Personal information
- Full name: William Bruce Gillion
- Date of birth: 17 October 2002 (age 24)
- Place of birth: Auckland, New Zealand
- Height: 1.78 m (5 ft 10 in)
- Position: Forward

Team information
- Current team: Western Sydney Wanderers
- Number: 21

Youth career
- Drury United
- Manurewa
- Western Suburbs

Senior career*
Years	Team	Apps	(Gls)
2019–2021	Western Suburbs	33	(6)
2022–2024	Auckland City	59	(23)
2024–2026	Auckland FC	20	(0)
2026	Auckland FC (OFC)	12	(5)
2026–	Western Sydney Wanderers	0	(0)

International career^{‡}
2023–	New Zealand U23	5	(1)
2024–	New Zealand	2	(0)
- * Club domestic league appearances and goals as of 29 April 2026 ‡ National team caps and goals as of 18 November 2024

Liam Gillion (born 17 October 2002) is a New Zealand footballer who plays as a forward for A-League club Western Sydney Wanderers. He also plays for the New Zealand national team.

== Club career ==
=== Youth career ===
Gillion played for Drury United, Manurewa and Western Suburbs at youth level, before making his first team debut with Suburbs in 2019.

=== Auckland City ===
In February 2022, Gillion signed with Auckland City.

=== Auckland FC ===
On 19 June 2024, Gillion signed a scholarship contract with new A-League side Auckland FC.

He made 13 appearances during the 2024–25 season, recording one assist in a 4–1 win over Central Coast Mariners FC. Gillion scored his first goal for the club in a 4–0 win over Gold Coast Knights in the Australia Cup.

On 14 January 2026, it was announced that Gillion would be part of Auckland FC (OFC) squad in the newly founded OFC Professional League, in line with OFC regulations allowing the inclusion of under-23 players from the A-League squad.

On 17 January 2026, Gillion started in a 3–0 win over South Island United, scoring a penalty and was awarded the OFC Man of the Match award. On 25 June 2026, it was announced that Gillion would be leaving to pursue opportunities elsewhere.

=== Western Sydney Wanderers ===
On 26 June 2026, Gillion joined fellow A-League Men club Western Sydney Wanderers on a two-year contract. He made his debut for the club on 23 July, starting in a 2–0 victory over Tigers FC in the Australia Cup.

== International career ==
Gillion was called up for the New Zealand U23 for the 2023 OFC Men's Olympic Qualifying Tournament. He made his debut on 30 August 2023, in the first group game against Fiji. In July 2024, Gillion was selected as an alternate player for New Zealand U23 at the 2024 Summer Olympics.

== Personal life ==
Gillion is the older brother of Fergus Gillion.

== Career statistics ==
=== Club ===
As of match played on 22 July 2026.

Appearances and goals by club, season and competition
Club	Season	League			Cup (Note: Includes appearances in the Chatham Cup, Australia Cup)		Continental		Others		Total	
Club	Season	Division	Apps	Goals	Apps	Goals	Apps	Goals	Apps	Goals	Apps	Goals
Western Suburbs	2019	Central League	2	0	0	0	—		—		2	0
Western Suburbs	2020	Central League	13	0	—		—		—		13	0
Western Suburbs	2021	National League	18	6	5	2	—		5 (Note: Appearances in South Central Series)	0	28	8
Western Suburbs	Total		33	6	5	2	0	0	5	0	43	8
Auckland City	2022	National League	20	4	4	0	3	1	1 (Note: Appearance in FIFA Club World Cup)	0	28	5
Auckland City	2023	National League	27	9	3	2	6	3	1	0	37	14
Auckland City	2024	National League	12	10	2	1	7	2	—		21	13
Auckland City	Total		59	23	9	3	16	6	2	0	86	32
Auckland FC	2024–25	A-League Men	13	0	—		—		2 (Note: Appearances in A-League Finals)	0	15	0
Auckland FC	2025–26	A-League Men	5	0	3	1	12 (Note: Includes appearances in the OFC Professional League)	5	4	0	24	6
Auckland FC	Total		18	0	3	1	12	5	6	0	39	6
Western Sydney Wanderers	2026–27	A-League Men	0	0	1	0	—		0	0	0	0
Career total			104	20	18	6	16	6	13	0	142	40

=== International ===
As of match played 18 November 2024

National team	Year	Apps	Goals
New Zealand	2024	2	0
Total		2	0

== Honours ==
Western Suburbs

- Central League: 2019

Auckland City

- Northern League: 2022, 2023, 2024
- New Zealand National League: 2022
- Chatham Cup: 2022
- OFC Champions League: 2022, 2023, 2024

Auckland FC

- A-League Premiership: 2024–25
- A-League Men Championship: 2026
- OFC Professional League: 2026

New Zealand U23

- OFC Men's Olympic Qualifying Tournament: 2023

Individual

- OFC Champions League Golden Ball: 2024
- OFC Professional League Team of the Season: 2026 (substitute)
