= Pīraʻe =

Commune in French Polynesia, France

- Commune
- Coat of arms

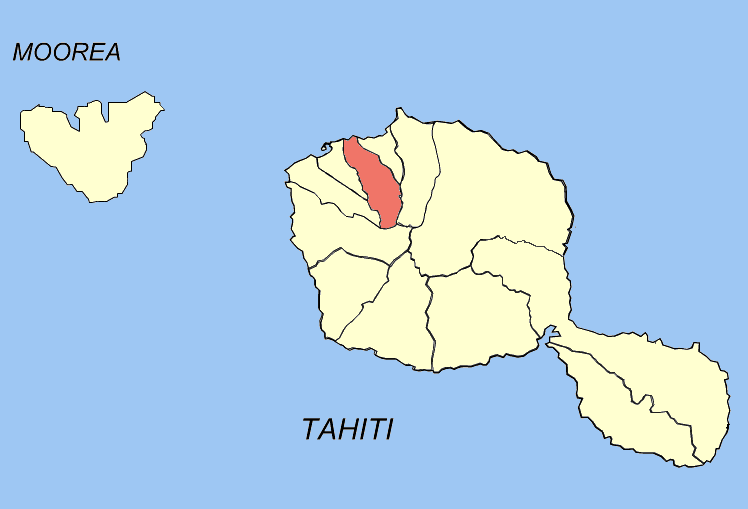
- Location of the commune (in red) within the Windward Islands
- Location of Pīraʻe
- Location within France
- Coordinates: 17°31′56″S 149°32′28″W
- Country: France
- Overseas collectivity: French Polynesia
- Subdivision: Windward Islands

Government
  - Mayor (2020–2026): Édouard Fritch
- Area^{1}: 35.4 km^{2} (13.7 sq mi)
- Highest elevation: 2,066 m (6,778 ft)
- Lowest elevation: 0 m (0 ft)
- Population (2022): 14,068
  - Density: 397/km^{2} (1,030/sq mi)
- Time zone: UTC−10:00
- INSEE/Postal code: 98736 /98716
- ^{1} French Land Register data, which excludes lakes, ponds, glaciers > 1 km^{2} (0.386 sq mi or 247 acres) and river estuaries.

Pīraʻe [piːraʔe] is a commune in the suburbs of Papeʻete in French Polynesia, an overseas collectivity of France in the Pacific Ocean. Pīraʻe is located on the island of Tahiti, in the administrative subdivision of the Windward Islands, themselves part of the Society Islands. It borders Papeʻete in the west and Arue in the east. At the 2022 census it had a population of 14,068. The Stade Pater Te Hono Nui is a stadium located in the commune.

== See also ==
- Stade Pater Te Hono Nui
