= 2025 FIFA Club World Cup Group C =

Soccer tournament group stage

Group C was one of eight groups in the 2025 FIFA Club World Cup, an international club soccer tournament hosted in the United States and organized by FIFA. It comprised four teams: Bayern Munich of Germany; Auckland City of New Zealand; Boca Juniors of Argentina; and Benfica of Portugal. Teams qualified by winning the respective continental club championships of their confederation or through a ranking of their performance in competitions. Only two clubs per country were allowed to qualify unless three or four won their respective continental club championship. The 2025 edition of the FIFA Club World Cup was the first in the tournament's history to be played under its quadrennial format with 32 teams. The group's matches began on June 15 and concluded on June 24.

== Teams ==
The four teams in Group C were decided by the FIFA Club World Cup draw held by FIFA on December 5, 2024, in the Miami area. The 32 participants were divided into four pots based on their confederation and ranking within FIFA's club ranking system. Each of the eight groups would receive one team from each pot. Teams from the same confederation could not be drawn into the same group except for those from UEFA, which had twelve slots; teams from the same national association were not able to be drawn into the same group.

2025 FIFA Club World Cup Group C draw
Draw position	Team	Association	Pot	Confederation	Method of qualification	Date of qualification	Appearance	Last appearance	Previous best performance
C1	Bayern Munich	Germany	1	UEFA	UEFA four-year ranking (1st among eligible)	December 17, 2023	3rd	2020	Winners (2013, 2020)
C2	Auckland City	New Zealand	4	OFC	OFC Champions League winners four-year ranking	December 17, 2023	12th	2023	Third place (2014)
C3	Boca Juniors	Argentina	3	CONMEBOL	CONMEBOL four-year ranking (2nd among eligible)	August 22, 2024	2nd	2007	Runners-up (2007)
C4	Benfica	Portugal	2	UEFA	UEFA four-year ranking (7th among eligible)	December 17, 2023	1st	—N/a	—N/a

== Standings ==
Pos	Team	Pld	W	D	L	GF	GA	GD	Pts	Qualification
1	(Portugal) Benfica	3	2	1	0	9	2	+7	7	Advance to knockout stage
2	(Germany) Bayern Munich	3	2	0	1	12	2	+10	6	Advance to knockout stage
3	(Argentina) Boca Juniors	3	0	2	1	4	5	−1	2	
4	(New Zealand) Auckland City	3	0	1	2	1	17	−16	1	

Source: FIFA
Rules for classification: Group stage tiebreakers

In the round of 16:

- The winners of Group C, Benfica, advanced to play the runners-up of Group D, Chelsea.
- The runners-up of Group C, Bayern Munich, advanced to play the winners of Group D, Flamengo.

== Matches ==
Matches took place from June 15 to 24. All times listed are local.

=== Bayern Munich vs Auckland City ===
June 15, 2025
12:00 pm EDT

Bayern Munich (Germany)	10–0	(New Zealand) Auckland City
Coman 6', 21'; Boey 18'; Olise 20', 45+3'; Müller 45', 89'; Musiala 67', 73' (pen.), 84'	Report

TQL Stadium, Cincinnati
Attendance: 21,152
Referee: Issa Sy (Senegal)

Bayern Munich	Auckland City

GK	1	(Germany) Manuel Neuer (c)
RB	23	(France) Sacha Boey
CB	4	(Germany) Jonathan Tah
CB	44	(Croatia) Josip Stanišić	(substituted off) 82'
LB	22	(Portugal) Raphaël Guerreiro	(substituted off) 61'
CM	6	(Germany) Joshua Kimmich
CM	45	(Germany) Aleksandar Pavlović
RW	17	(France) Michael Olise	(substituted off) 46'
AM	25	(Germany) Thomas Müller
LW	11	(France) Kingsley Coman	(substituted off) 46'
CF	9	(England) Harry Kane	(substituted off) 61'
Substitutions:
MF	46	(Germany) Lennart Karl	(substituted on) 46'
FW	7	(Germany) Serge Gnabry	(substituted on) 46'
DF	2	(France) Dayot Upamecano	(substituted on) 61'
MF	42	(Germany) Jamal Musiala	(substituted on) 61'
DF	49	(Morocco) Adam Aznou	(substituted on) 82'
Manager:
(Belgium) Vincent Kompany

GK	1	(New Zealand) Conor Tracey
CB	3	(New Zealand) Adam Mitchell
CB	25	(New Zealand) Michael den Heijer	(substituted off) 82'
CB	5	(New Zealand) Nikko Boxall
RWB	12	(Kosovo) Regont Murati
LWB	13	(New Zealand) Nathan Lobo	(substituted off) 66'
RM	26	(New Zealand) David Yoo	(substituted off) 71'
CM	8	(Spain) Gerard Garriga	(substituted off) 66'
CM	2	(New Zealand) Mario Ilich (c)
LM	10	(New Zealand) Dylan Manickum	(substituted off) 71'
CF	7	(New Zealand) Myer Bevan
Substitutions:
FW	17	(Colombia) Jerson Lagos	(substituted on) 66'
MF	22	(China) Zhou Tong	(substituted on) 66'
FW	11	(New Zealand) Ryan De Vries	(substituted on) 71'
FW	9	(New Zealand) Angus Kilkolly	(substituted on) 71'
DF	23	(New Zealand) Alfie Rogers	(substituted on) 82'
Interim manager:
(New Zealand) Ivan Vicelich (Note: As Auckland City manager Paul Posa would remained in New Zealand during the first two weeks of June due to personal reasons, Ivan Vicelich served as the interim manager for Auckland City's first match.)

Man of the Match:
Michael Olise (Bayern Munich)

Assistant referees:
Djibril Camara (Senegal)
Nouha Bangoura (Senegal)
Fourth official:
Mutaz Ibrahim (Libya)
Video assistant referee:
Mahmoud Ashour (Egypt)
Assistant video assistant referee:
Nicolás Gallo (Colombia)
Support video assistant referee:
Khamis Al-Marri (Qatar)

=== Boca Juniors vs Benfica ===
June 16, 2025
6:00 pm EDT

Boca Juniors (Argentina)	2–2	(Portugal) Benfica
Otamendi 21' (o.g.); Battaglia 27'	Report	Di María 45+3' (pen.); Otamendi 84'

Hard Rock Stadium, Miami Gardens
Attendance: 55,574
Referee: César Ramos (Mexico)

Boca Juniors	Benfica

GK	25	(Argentina) Agustín Marchesín
RB	17	(Peru) Luis Advíncula
CB	4	(Argentina) Nicolás Figal	(red card) 88'
CB	32	(Argentina) Ayrton Costa	(yellow card) 85'
LB	23	(Argentina) Lautaro Blanco
DM	5	(Argentina) Rodrigo Battaglia
CM	21	(Spain) Ander Herrera	(red card) 45'	(substituted off) 20'
CM	8	(Chile) Carlos Palacios	(yellow card) 66'	(substituted off) 66'
RF	22	(Argentina) Kevin Zenón
CF	16	(Uruguay) Miguel Merentiel (c)		(substituted off) 65'
LF	20	(Argentina) Alan Velasco		(substituted off) 58'
Substitutions:
MF	30	(Argentina) Tomás Belmonte		(substituted on) 20'
FW	9	(Argentina) Milton Giménez		(substituted on) 58'
FW	7	(Argentina) Exequiel Zeballos		(substituted on) 65'
MF	15	(Chile) Williams Alarcón		(substituted on) 66'
Manager:
(Argentina) Miguel Ángel Russo

GK	1	(Ukraine) Anatoliy Trubin
RB	26	(Sweden) Samuel Dahl		(substituted off) 46'
CB	4	(Portugal) António Silva
CB	30	(Argentina) Nicolás Otamendi (c)
LB	3	(Spain) Álvaro Carreras	(yellow card) 67'
CM	61	(Portugal) Florentino Luís		(substituted off) 90'
CM	85	(Portugal) Renato Sanches		(substituted off) 61'
RW	11	(Argentina) Ángel Di María		(substituted off) 77'
AM	8	(Norway) Fredrik Aursnes
LW	27	(Portugal) Bruma		(substituted off) 61'
CF	14	(Greece) Vangelis Pavlidis	(yellow card) 83'
Substitutions:
FW	19	(Italy) Andrea Belotti	(red card) 70'	(substituted on) 46'
FW	17	(Turkey) Kerem Aktürkoğlu		(substituted on) 61'
MF	10	(Turkey) Orkun Kökçü		(substituted on) 61'
FW	25	(Argentina) Gianluca Prestianni		(substituted on) 77'
MF	18	(Luxembourg) Leandro Barreiro		(substituted on) 90'
Manager:
(Portugal) Bruno Lage

Man of the Match:
Miguel Merentiel (Boca Juniors)

Assistant referees:
Alberto Morín (Mexico)
Marco Bisguerra (Mexico)
Fourth official:
Iván Barton (El Salvador)
Video assistant referee:
Guillermo Pacheco (Mexico)
Assistant video assistant referee:
Armando Villarreal (United States)
Support video assistant referee:
Carlos del Cerro Grande (Spain)

=== Benfica vs Auckland City ===
At 1:06 pm EDT, during the half-time break, the match was interrupted due to adverse weather conditions. The match was resumed at 3:20 pm EDT.

June 20, 2025
12:00 pm EDT

Benfica (Portugal)	6–0	(New Zealand) Auckland City
Di María 45+8' (pen.), 90+8' (pen.); Pavlidis 53'; Sanches 63'; Barreiro 76', 78'	Report

Inter&Co Stadium, Orlando
Attendance: 6,730
Referee: Salman Falahi (Qatar)

Benfica	Auckland City

GK	1	(Ukraine) Anatoliy Trubin
RB	8	(Norway) Fredrik Aursnes		(substituted off) 71'
CB	4	(Portugal) António Silva		(substituted off) 86'
CB	30	(Argentina) Nicolás Otamendi (c)
LB	3	(Spain) Álvaro Carreras	(yellow card) 45+4'	(substituted off) 46'
CM	18	(Luxembourg) Leandro Barreiro
CM	10	(Turkey) Orkun Kökçü	(yellow card) 48'	(substituted off) 61'
RW	11	(Argentina) Ángel Di María
AM	25	(Argentina) Gianluca Prestianni		(substituted off) 71'
LW	17	(Turkey) Kerem Aktürkoğlu		(substituted off) 61'
CF	14	(Greece) Vangelis Pavlidis
Substitutions:
DF	26	(Sweden) Samuel Dahl		(substituted on) 46'
MF	85	(Portugal) Renato Sanches		(substituted on) 61'
FW	21	(Norway) Andreas Schjelderup		(substituted on) 61'
FW	47	(Portugal) Tiago Gouveia		(substituted on) 71'
FW	84	(Portugal) João Rego		(substituted on) 71'
DF	81	(Albania) Adrian Bajrami	(yellow card) 87'	(substituted on) 86'
Manager:
(Portugal) Bruno Lage

GK	24	(New Zealand) Nathan Garrow
CB	3	(New Zealand) Adam Mitchell
CB	25	(New Zealand) Michael den Heijer	(substituted off) 80'
CB	5	(New Zealand) Nikko Boxall
RWB	21	(New Zealand) Adam Bell
LWB	17	(Colombia) Jerson Lagos
RM	26	(New Zealand) David Yoo	(substituted off) 59'
CM	22	(China) Zhou Tong	(substituted off) 46'
CM	2	(New Zealand) Mario Ilich (c)	(substituted off) 59'
LM	27	(New Zealand) Haris Zeb	(substituted off) 59'
CF	7	(New Zealand) Myer Bevan	(substituted off) 73'
Substitutions:
MF	8	(Spain) Gerard Garriga	(substituted on) 46'
MF	6	(New Zealand) Jackson Manuel	(substituted on) 59'
FW	10	(New Zealand) Dylan Manickum	(substituted on) 59'
MF	20	(New Zealand) Matt Ellis	(substituted on) 59'
FW	11	(New Zealand) Ryan De Vries	(substituted on) 73'
DF	4	(New Zealand) Christian Gray	(substituted on) 80'
Manager:
(New Zealand) Paul Posa

Man of the Match:
Ángel Di María (Benfica)

Assistant referees:
Ramzan Al-Naemi (Qatar)
Majid Al-Shammari (Qatar)
Fourth official:
Danny Makkelie (Netherlands)
Video assistant referee:
Khamis Al-Marri (Qatar)
Assistant video assistant referee:
Fu Ming (China)
Support video assistant referee:
Rob Dieperink (Netherlands)

=== Bayern Munich vs Boca Juniors ===
June 20, 2025
9:00 pm EDT

Bayern Munich (Germany)	2–1	(Argentina) Boca Juniors
Kane 18'; Olise 84'	Report	Merentiel 66'

Hard Rock Stadium, Miami Gardens
Attendance: 63,587
Referee: Alireza Faghani (Australia)

Bayern Munich	Boca Juniors

GK	1	(Germany) Manuel Neuer (c)
RB	27	(Austria) Konrad Laimer
CB	4	(Germany) Jonathan Tah
CB	44	(Croatia) Josip Stanišić
LB	22	(Portugal) Raphaël Guerreiro		(substituted off) 67'
CM	6	(Germany) Joshua Kimmich
CM	8	(Germany) Leon Goretzka	(yellow card) 45+3'	(substituted off) 57'
RW	17	(France) Michael Olise
AM	7	(Germany) Serge Gnabry		(substituted off) 57'
LW	11	(France) Kingsley Coman		(substituted off) 67'
CF	9	(England) Harry Kane
Substitutions:
MF	45	(Germany) Aleksandar Pavlović		(substituted on) 57'
MF	42	(Germany) Jamal Musiala		(substituted on) 57' (substituted off) 82'
FW	10	(Germany) Leroy Sané		(substituted on) 67'
DF	2	(France) Dayot Upamecano		(substituted on) 67'
FW	25	(Germany) Thomas Müller		(substituted on) 82'
Manager:
(Belgium) Vincent Kompany

GK	25	(Argentina) Agustín Marchesín
RB	17	(Peru) Luis Advíncula	(yellow card) 36'
CB	40	(Argentina) Lautaro Di Lollo	(yellow card) 71'
CB	32	(Argentina) Ayrton Costa
LB	23	(Argentina) Lautaro Blanco
CM	5	(Argentina) Rodrigo Battaglia
CM	30	(Argentina) Tomás Belmonte		(substituted off) 69'
RW	22	(Argentina) Kevin Zenón		(substituted off) 59'
AM	8	(Chile) Carlos Palacios		(substituted off) 69'
LW	20	(Argentina) Alan Velasco		(substituted off) 80'
CF	16	(Uruguay) Miguel Merentiel (c)		(substituted off) 80'
Substitutions:
MF	27	(Argentina) Malcom Braida		(substituted on) 59'
FW	9	(Argentina) Milton Giménez		(substituted on) 69'
MF	15	(Chile) Williams Alarcón		(substituted on) 69'
FW	7	(Argentina) Exequiel Zeballos		(substituted on) 80'
DF	3	(Uruguay) Marcelo Saracchi		(substituted on) 80'
Other disciplinary actions:
DF	6	(Argentina) Marcos Rojo	(yellow card) 15'
Manager:
(Argentina) Miguel Ángel Russo

Man of the Match:
Harry Kane (Bayern Munich)

Assistant referees:
Anton Shchetinin (Australia)
Ashley Beecham (Australia)
Fourth official:
Tori Penso (United States)
Video assistant referee:
Tatiana Guzmán (Nicaragua)
Assistant video assistant referee:
Shaun Evans (Australia)
Support video assistant referee:
Jérôme Brisard (France)

=== Auckland City vs Boca Juniors ===
At 3:21 pm CDT, in the 54th minute, the match was interrupted due to adverse weather conditions. The match was resumed at 4:10 pm.

June 24, 2025
2:00 pm CDT

Auckland City (New Zealand)	1–1	(Argentina) Boca Juniors
Gray 52'	Report	Garrow 26' (o.g.)

Geodis Park, Nashville
Attendance: 16,899
Referee: Glenn Nyberg (Sweden)

Auckland City	Boca Juniors

GK	24	(New Zealand) Nathan Garrow
CB	4	(New Zealand) Christian Gray
CB	3	(New Zealand) Adam Mitchell
CB	5	(New Zealand) Nikko Boxall
RWB	12	(Kosovo) Regont Murati	(substituted off) 54'
LWB	17	(Colombia) Jerson Lagos	(substituted off) 83'
RM	26	(New Zealand) David Yoo	(substituted off) 54'
CM	8	(Spain) Gerard Garriga	(substituted off) 54'
CM	2	(New Zealand) Mario Ilich (c)
LM	10	(New Zealand) Dylan Manickum	(substituted off) 68'
CF	7	(New Zealand) Myer Bevan
Substitutions:
MF	14	(New Zealand) Jordan Vale	(substituted on) 54'
MF	20	(New Zealand) Matt Ellis	(substituted on) 54'
DF	19	(Republic of Ireland) Dylan Connolly	(substituted on) 54'
FW	27	(New Zealand) Haris Zeb	(substituted on) 68'
FW	16	(New Zealand) Joseph Lee	(substituted on) 83'
Manager:
(New Zealand) Paul Posa

GK	25	(Argentina) Agustín Marchesín
RB	17	(Peru) Luis Advíncula
CB	40	(Argentina) Lautaro Di Lollo
CB	26	(Argentina) Marco Pellegrino
LB	23	(Argentina) Lautaro Blanco
CM	5	(Argentina) Rodrigo Battaglia
CM	8	(Chile) Carlos Palacios
AM	20	(Argentina) Alan Velasco	(substituted off) 54'
RF	7	(Argentina) Exequiel Zeballos	(substituted off) 26'
CF	10	(Uruguay) Edinson Cavani (c)	(substituted off) 54'
LF	16	(Uruguay) Miguel Merentiel
Substitutions:
MF	22	(Argentina) Kevin Zenón	(substituted on) 26'
FW	9	(Argentina) Milton Giménez	(substituted on) 54'
MF	27	(Argentina) Malcom Braida	(substituted on) 54'
Manager:
(Argentina) Miguel Ángel Russo

Man of the Match:
Christian Gray (Auckland City)

Assistant referees:
Mahbod Beigi (Sweden)
Andreas Söderkvist (Sweden)
Fourth official:
Jean-Jacques Ndala (DR Congo)
Video assistant referee:
Bram Van Driessche (Belgium)
Assistant video assistant referee:
Rob Dieperink (Netherlands)
Support video assistant referee:
Mahmoud Ashour (Egypt)

=== Benfica vs Bayern Munich ===
June 24, 2025
3:00 pm EDT

Benfica (Portugal)	1–0	(Germany) Bayern Munich
Schjelderup 13'	Report

Bank of America Stadium, Charlotte
Attendance: 33,287
Referee: François Letexier (France)

Benfica	Bayern Munich

GK	1	(Ukraine) Anatoliy Trubin
RB	8	(Norway) Fredrik Aursnes
CB	4	(Portugal) António Silva
CB	30	(Argentina) Nicolás Otamendi (c)	(yellow card) 46'
LB	26	(Sweden) Samuel Dahl
CM	85	(Portugal) Renato Sanches	(yellow card) 19'	(substituted off) 78'
CM	18	(Luxembourg) Leandro Barreiro
RW	11	(Argentina) Ángel Di María		(substituted off) 86'
AM	25	(Argentina) Gianluca Prestianni		(substituted off) 54'
LW	21	(Norway) Andreas Schjelderup		(substituted off) 54'
CF	14	(Greece) Vangelis Pavlidis		(substituted off) 86'
Substitutions:
MF	10	(Turkey) Orkun Kökçü		(substituted on) 54'
FW	17	(Turkey) Kerem Aktürkoğlu		(substituted on) 54'
DF	81	(Albania) Adrian Bajrami		(substituted on) 78'
FW	84	(Portugal) João Rego		(substituted on) 86'
FW	47	(Portugal) Tiago Gouveia	(yellow card) 89'	(substituted on) 86'
Manager:
(Portugal) Bruno Lage

GK	1	(Germany) Manuel Neuer (c)
RB	23	(France) Sacha Boey	(substituted off) 62'
CB	2	(France) Dayot Upamecano	(substituted off) 58'
CB	44	(Croatia) Josip Stanišić
LB	22	(Portugal) Raphaël Guerreiro
CM	16	(Portugal) João Palhinha	(substituted off) 46'
CM	45	(Germany) Aleksandar Pavlović
RW	10	(Germany) Leroy Sané
AM	20	(Germany) Tom Bischof	(substituted off) 46'
LW	7	(Germany) Serge Gnabry	(substituted off) 46'
CF	25	(Germany) Thomas Müller
Substitutions:
MF	6	(Germany) Joshua Kimmich	(substituted on) 46'
FW	9	(England) Harry Kane	(substituted on) 46'
FW	17	(France) Michael Olise	(substituted on) 46'
DF	4	(Germany) Jonathan Tah	(substituted on) 58'
MF	27	(Austria) Konrad Laimer	(substituted on) 62'
Manager:
(Belgium) Vincent Kompany

Man of the Match:
Anatoliy Trubin (Benfica)

Assistant referees:
Cyril Mugnier (France)
Mehdi Rahmouni (France)
Fourth official:
Espen Eskås (Norway)
Video assistant referee:
Jérôme Brisard (France)
Assistant video assistant referee:
Ivan Bebek (Croatia)
Support video assistant referee:
Hamza Al-Fariq (Morocco)

== Discipline ==
Fair play points would have been used as tiebreakers if the overall and head-to-head records of teams were tied. These were calculated based on yellow and red cards received in all group matches as follows:

- first yellow card: −1 point;
- indirect red card (second yellow card): −3 points;
- direct red card: −4 points;
- yellow card and direct red card: −5 points;

Only one of the above deductions was applied to a player in a single match.

Team	Match 1				Match 2				Match 3				Points
Team	Yellow card	(yellow card) (yellow-red card)	Red card	(yellow card) (red card)	Yellow card	(yellow card) (yellow-red card)	Red card	(yellow card) (red card)	Yellow card	(yellow card) (yellow-red card)	Red card	(yellow card) (red card)	Points
(New Zealand) Auckland City													0
(Germany) Bayern Munich					1								−1
(Portugal) Benfica	2		1		3				3				−12
(Argentina) Boca Juniors	2		2		3								−13
