= 2026 Auckland City FC season =

Auckland City
2026 season
- Chairman: Ivan Vuksich
- Manager: Rudy Mozr
- Stadium: Kiwitea Street
- Northern League: 3rd
- Chatham Cup: Quarter-finals
- OFC Champions League: Winners
Home colours	Away colours	Third colours
- All statistics correct as of 9 May 2026.

The 2026 season is the 23rd in the history of Auckland City Football Club. In addition to the domestic league, the club will participate in the Chatham Cup for the 6th time and the OFC Men's Champions League for the 21st time. This is the first season they will not qualify for the FIFA Intercontinental Cup, due to the team who represents Oceania in the tournament being changed from the OFC Men's Champions League winners to the OFC Professional League winners.

== Overview ==
=== Northern league ===
The league fixtures were announced on 24 February 2026. City played the opening fixture against Western Springs on 21 March 2026.

== Players ==
Players and squad numbers last updated on 20 May 2026. Note: Flags indicate national team as defined under FIFA eligibility rules; some limited exceptions apply. Players may hold more than one non-FIFA nationality.

No.	Pos.	Nation	Player
1	GK	NZL	Nathan Garrow
2	MF	NZL	Mario Ilich (captain)
3	DF	NZL	Adam Mitchell
4	DF	NZL	Nikko Boxall
5	DF	NZL	Nathan Rostron
6	MF	NZL	Kieren Richards
7	FW	CZE	Michel Doudera
8	MF	ESP	Gerard Garriga
9	FW	NZL	Angus Kilkolly
10	FW	NZL	Dylan Manickum
11	FW	NZL	Ryan De Vries
12	DF	KOS	Regont Murati
13	FW	NZL	Shaan Anand

No.	Pos.	Nation	Player
14	FW	CHI	Nicolas Zambrano
15	MF	NZL	Jeremy Foo
16	MF	NZL	Fergus Gillion
17	FW	NZL	Bono Kakurov
18	GK	FIJ	Areya Prasad
19	DF	IRL	Dylan Connolly
21	DF	NZL	Adam Bell
22	FW	CHN	Zhou Tong
23	DF	NZL	Alfie Rogers
24	GK	URU	Sebastian Ciganda
27	FW	NZL	Thomas Golding
—	DF	NZL	Christian Gray
—	GK	NZL	Matthew Foord

== Management team ==
As of 7 May 2026

Position	Staff
Head coach	(Czech Republic) Rudy Mozr
Assistant coach	(New Zealand) Ivan Vicelich
Assistant coach	(New Zealand) Alan Shaker
Assistant coach	(New Zealand) Karlo Pavić
Goalkeeper coach	(New Zealand) Adam Bannister
Physio	(New Zealand) Matt Payne

== Transfers ==
=== Transfers in ===
No.	Position	Player	Transferred from	Type/fee	Contract length	Date	Ref.
7	FW	(Czech Republic) Michal Doudera	(Czech Republic) Brozany	Free transfer	1 year	6 March 2026	
5	DF	(New Zealand) Nathan Rostron	(New Zealand) Birkenhead United	Free transfer	1 year	17 March 2026	
6	FW	(New Zealand) Kieren Richards	(New Zealand) Birkenhead United	Free transfer	1 year	17 March 2026	
13	FW	(New Zealand) Shaan Anand	(New Zealand) Auckland United	Free transfer	1 year	17 March 2026	
14	FW	(Chile) Nicolas Zambrano	(New Zealand) Dunedin City Royals	Free transfer	1 year	17 March 2026	
27	FW	(New Zealand) Thomas Golding	(New Zealand) Birkenhead United	Free transfer	1 year	17 March 2026	
16	MF	(New Zealand) Fergus Gillion	(Fiji) Bula FC	Free transfer	1 year	19 June 2026	
—	DF	(New Zealand) Christian Gray	(New Zealand) South Island United	Free transfer	1 year	19 June 2026	
—	GK	(New Zealand) Matthew Foord	(Fiji) Bula FC	Free transfer	1 year	19 June 2026	
—	DF	(New Zealand) Nathan Lobo	(New Zealand) Auckland FC (OFC)	Free transfer	1 year	30 June 2026	
—	MF	(New Zealand) Matt Ellis	(New Zealand) Auckland FC (OFC)	Free transfer	1 year	30 June 2026	
—	DF	(New Zealand) Michael den Heijer	(New Zealand) Auckland FC (OFC)	Free transfer	1 year	30 June 2026	
—	DF	(Czech Republic) Pavel Osmancik	(Czech Republic) FK Arsenal Česká Lípa	Free transfer	1 year	30 June 2026	
—	MF	(New Zealand) Ryan Watson	(New Zealand) Western Springs	Free transfer	1 year	30 June 2026	

=== Tranfers out ===
No.	Position	Player	Transferred to	Type/fee	Date	Ref.
7	FW	(New Zealand) Myer Bevan	(Cambodia) Boeung Ket	Free transfer	20 December 2025	
1	GK	(New Zealand) Conor Tracey	Free agent	End of contract	1 January 2026	
6	MF	(New Zealand) Jackson Manuel	(New Zealand) South Island United	Free transfer	1 January 2026	
14	DF	(New Zealand) Jordan Vale	Free agent	End of contract	1 January 2026	
26	MF	(New Zealand) David Yoo	(New Zealand) South Island United	Free transfer	1 January 2026	
4	DF	(New Zealand) Christian Gray	(New Zealand) South Island United	Free transfer	14 January 2026	
13	DF	(New Zealand) Nathan Lobo	(New Zealand) Auckland FC (OFC)	Free transfer	14 January 2026	
20	MF	(New Zealand) Matt Ellis	(New Zealand) Auckland FC (OFC)	Free transfer	14 January 2026	
25	DF	(New Zealand) Michael den Heijer	(New Zealand) Auckland FC (OFC)	Free transfer	14 January 2026	
27	FW	(New Zealand) Haris Zeb	(New Zealand) South Island United	Free transfer	14 January 2026	
17	FW	(Colombia) Jerson Lagos	(Australia) Queensland Lions	Free transfer	22 January 2026	
16	FW	(New Zealand) Joseph Lee	(Australia) Heidelberg United	Free transfer	4 February 2026	
29	DF	(New Zealand) Riley Dalziell	(New Zealand) Auckland FC Reserves	Free transfer	1 March 2026	
30	MF	(New Zealand) Orlando Thorpe	(New Zealand) East Coast Bays	Free transfer	1 March 2026	
—	MF	(New Zealand) Paris Domfeh	(New Zealand) Western Springs	Free transfer	1 April 2026	

== Competitions ==
=== Overall record ===
Competition	First match	Last match	Starting round	Final position	Record							
Competition	First match	Last match	Starting round	Final position	Pld	W	D	L	GF	GA	GD	Win %
Northern League	21 March 2026	29 August 2026	Matchday 1		21	13	3	5	50	19	+31	61.90
Chatham Cup	1 June 2026		Round 2	Quarter Final	4	3	0	1	14	4	+10	75.00
OFC Champions League	10 August 2026		Group stage		0	0	0	0	0	0	+0	—
Total					25	16	3	6	64	23	+41	64.00

Source: Soccerway

=== Northern League ===
==== League table ====
Pos	Team	Pld	W	D	L	GF	GA	GD	Pts	Qualification
1	Birkenhead United (C, P)	22	18	4	0	58	13	+45	58	Winner of Northern League, qualification to National League Championship and promoted to National League via ranking
2	Eastern Suburbs (P)	22	14	5	3	41	9	+32	47	Qualification to National League Championship and promoted to National League via ranking
3	Auckland City (P)	22	14	3	5	51	19	+32	45	Qualification to National League Championship and promoted to National League via ranking
4	Auckland United (P)	22	12	5	5	47	21	+26	41	Qualification to National League Championship and promoted to National League via ranking
5	Fencibles United	22	13	2	7	55	36	+19	41	

Source: NRF
Rules for classification: 1) Points; 2) Goal difference; 3) Goals scored; 4) Goals against; 5) Head to head; 6) Disciplinary record; 7) Coin toss
(C) Champions; (P) Promoted

==== Results summary ====
Overall								Home						Away					
Pld	W	D	L	GF	GA	GD	Pts	W	D	L	GF	GA	GD	W	D	L	GF	GA	GD
11	7	1	3	23	8	+15	22	4	0	2	13	5	+8	3	1	1	10	3	+7

==== Results by round ====
Information needed

==== Matches ====
Win Draw Loss Fixtures

21 March 2026 1	Western Springs	0–3	Auckland City	Western Springs
17:30 NZDT		Report	Kilkolly 33' (yellow card) 66'; Richards 38'; Garriga (yellow card) 87'; Manickum 90+3'	Stadium: Seddon Fields; Referee: Veer Singh; Assistant referees: Charlie Tseng; Jonathan Smith

28 March 2026 2	Auckland City	0–1	Eastern Suburbs	Sandringham
15:00 NZDT	Mitchell (yellow card) 56'; Rogers (yellow card) 78'	Report	Atne 16'; Echagüe (yellow card) 40'; Murphy (yellow card) 69'	Stadium: Kiwitea Street; Referee: Yunjie Diao; Assistant referees: Hayden Tutbury; Kristian Klette

3 April 2026 3	Auckland City	0–1	Birkenhead United	Sandringham
15:00 NZDT		Report	Nair 45+2'	Stadium: Kiwitea Street; Referee: Riley Greenbury; Assistant referees: Pranil Gordhan; James Portegys

6 April 2026 4	Auckland United	1–0	Auckland City	Mount Roskill
15:00 NZST	Flowerdew 43'; Cristales (yellow card) 84'	Report		Stadium: Keith Hay Park; Referee: Ashley Wilson; Assistant referees: Elliot Winstanley; David Shearman

11 April 2026 5	Auckland City	4–2	Manukau United	Sandringham
15:00 NZST	Richards 8'; Rostron 21'; Connolly (yellow card) 23'; Golding 30'; Doudera 70'	Report	Mohammed 17'; Ugwa 88'	Stadium: Kiwitea Street; Referee: Jack Henderson; Assistant referees: Jonathan Smith; David Shearman

18 April 2026 6	Tauranga City	0–0	Auckland City	Mount Maunganui
12:30 NZST	Molloy (yellow card) 37'	Report	Ilich (yellow card) 57'; Doudera (yellow card) 82'	Stadium: Links Avenue Stadium; Referee: Yunjie Diao; Assistant referees: James Portegys; Geoff Morgan

25 April 2026 7	Auckland City	4–1	Fencibles United	Sandringham
15:00 NZST	Manickum 3', 41', 90+4'; Rostron (yellow card) 66'	Report	Wessels 50'; Boon (yellow card) 88'; Probert (yellow card) 90+3'	Stadium: Kiwitea Street; Referee: Ashley Wilson; Assistant referees: Reza Al Rabea; John Hoffman

2 May 2026 8	Bay Olympic	1–4	Auckland City	New Lynn
15:00 NZST	Murati 69' (o.g.); Hrdlicka (yellow card) 72'; Stephan (yellow card) 76'	Report	Manickum 26', 35'; Bell (yellow card) 32'; Murati 38'; Kilkolly 77'	Stadium: Olympic Park; Referee: Campbell-Kirk Kawana-Waugh; Assistant referees: Haydan Tutbury; Campbell Miles

9 May 2026 9	Auckland City	1–0	East Coast Bays	Sandringham
15:00 NZST	Kilkolly 72'; Garriga (yellow card) 77'; Bell (yellow card) 83'; Doudera (yellow card) 89'	Report		Stadium: Kiwitea Street; Referee: Luke Gardner; Assistant referees: Nathan Cox; Sacin Sharma

15 May 2026 10	Auckland FC Reserves	1–3	Auckland City	Whenuapai
19:00 NZST	Hill 33'; Naidoo (yellow card) 36'; D'Hotman (yellow card) 73'	Report	Doudera (yellow card) 17'; Kilkolly 61', 70'; Connolly (yellow card) 72'; Rostron 84'	Stadium: Fred Taylor Park; Referee: Shawn Liu; Assistant referees: Marcus Turner; Grigory Plekhotkin

23 May 2026 11	Auckland City	4–0	Melville United	Sandringham
15:00 NZDT	Doudera 44'; Rostron (yellow card) 45+1'; Kilkolly 56'; Kacurov 84'; Anand 90'	Report	Gall (yellow card) 45+3'; Alamshah (yellow card) 83'	Stadium: Kiwitea Street; Referee: James Berry; Assistant referees: Ujwaal Mudliar; Campbell Miles

30 May 2026 12	Eastern Suburbs	0–0	Auckland City	Kohimarama
12:00 NZDT	Saez (yellow card) 32'; Echague (yellow card) 62'; de Groot (yellow card) 90'	Report	Kilkolly (yellow card) 62'; Mitchell (yellow card) 73'	Stadium: Madills Farm; Referee: Kirk Davis; Assistant referees: Johnathan Smith; James Portegys

6 June 2026 13	Auckland City	1–1	Auckland United	Sandringham
15:00 NZDT	Mitchell 71'; Rostron (yellow card) 90+2'	Report	Campbell (yellow card) 36'; Hall (yellow card) 86'; Khaled (yellow card) 90+6'; Wallace 90+7'	Stadium: Kiwitea Street; Referee: Riley Greenbury; Assistant referees: Reza Al Rabea; James Portegys

== Statistics ==
=== Appearances and goals ===
As of match played 23 May 2026

Includes all competitions.

No.	Pos	Nat	Player	Total		Northern League		National League		Chatham Cup		OFC Champions League	
No.	Pos	Nat	Player	Apps	Goals	Apps	Goals	Apps	Goals	Apps	Goals	Apps	Goals
Goalkeepers:
1	GK	(New Zealand) NZL	Nathan Garrow	10	0	10	0	0	0	0	0	0	0
18	GK	(Fiji) FIJ	Areya Prasad	0	0	0	0	0	0	0	0	0	0
24	GK	(Uruguay) URU	Sebastián Ciganda	1	0	1	0	0	0	0	0	0	0
Defenders:
3	DF	(New Zealand) NZL	Adam Mitchell	7	0	7	0	0	0	0	0	0	0
5	DF	(New Zealand) NZL	Nathan Rostron	11	2	11	2	0	0	0	0	0	0
12	DF	(Kosovo) KOS	Regont Murati	11	1	11	1	0	0	0	0	0	0
19	DF	(Republic of Ireland) IRL	Dylan Connolly	9	0	7+2	0	0	0	0	0	0	0
21	DF	(New Zealand) NZL	Adam Bell	7	0	6+1	0	0	0	0	0	0	0
Midfielders:
2	MF	(New Zealand) NZL	Mario Ilich	9	0	9	0	0	0	0	0	0	0
7	MF	(Czech Republic) CZE	Michal Doudera	10	2	10	2	0	0	0	0	0	0
8	MF	(Spain) ESP	Gerard Garriga	8	0	7+1	0	0	0	0	0	0	0
15	MF	(New Zealand) NZL	Jeremy Foo	8	0	5+3	0	0	0	0	0	0	0
26	MF	(New Zealand) NZL	Kian Shahbazpour	1	0	0+1	0	0	0	0	0	0	0
Forwards:
6	FW	(New Zealand) NZL	Kieren Richards	6	2	3+3	2	0	0	0	0	0	0
9	FW	(New Zealand) NZL	Angus Kilkolly	7	5	7	5	0	0	0	0	0	0
10	FW	(New Zealand) NZL	Dylan Manickum	5	6	5	6	0	0	0	0	0	0
11	FW	(New Zealand) NZL	Ryan De Vries	3	0	2+1	0	0	0	0	0	0	0
13	FW	(New Zealand) NZL	Shaan Anand	7	1	1+6	1	0	0	0	0	0	0
14	FW	(Chile) CHI	Nicolas Zambrano	6	0	1+4	0	0	0	1	0	0	0
17	FW	(New Zealand) NZL	Bono Kacurov	5	1	1+4	1	0	0	0	0	0	0
22	FW	(China) CHN	Tong Zhou	4	0	3+1	0	0	0	0	0	0	0
27	FW	(New Zealand) NZL	Thomas Golding	11	2	8+3	2	0	0	0	0	0	0

=== Clean sheets ===
Rank	No.	Player	Northern League	National League	Chatham Cup	OFC Champions League	Total
1	1	(New Zealand) Nathan Garrow	4	–	–	–	4
2	24	(Uruguay) Sebastian Ciganda	0	–	–	–	0
Total			4	0	0	0	4
