= 2024 Chatham Cup final =

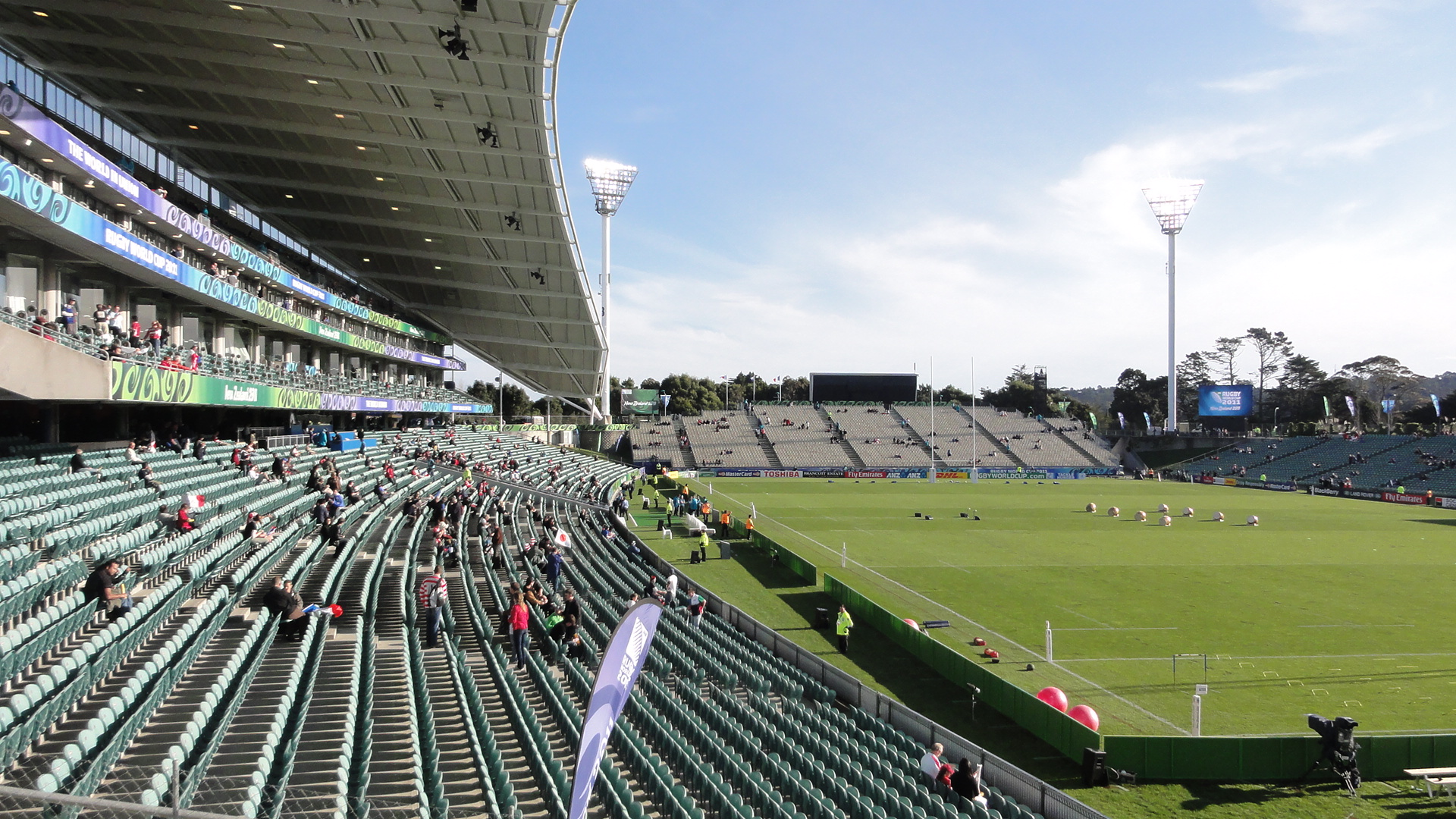
- The match took place at North Harbour Stadium.
- Event: 2024 Chatham Cup
Wellington Olympic	Auckland City
1	1
- Wellington Olympic won 5–4 on penalties
- Date: 7 September 2024
- Venue: North Harbour Stadium, Auckland
- Jack Batty Cup: Stipe Ukich
- Referee: Luke Gardner
- Weather: Mostly cloudy 16 °C (61 °F); 72% humidity

The 2024 Chatham Cup final was a football match played at North Harbour Stadium in Auckland, New Zealand, on 7 September 2024 to determine the winners of the 2024 Chatham Cup. It was the 96th final of New Zealand football's primary cup competition, the Chatham Cup.

The final was contested between current National League champions Wellington Olympic and rivals Auckland City, who are current the OFC Champions League holders. This was the first time these two sides have met in the final.

== Route to the final ==
=== Wellington Olympic ===
Wellington Olympic's route to the final
Round	Opposition	Score
2	Seatoun (H)	4–0
3	Western Suburbs (H)	5–0
4	Stop Out (H)	8–0
QF	Manurewa (H)	4–0
SF	Coastal Spirit (A)	5–1
Key: (H) = Home venue; (A) = Away venue

This was Olympic's third final. The club previously lost in 1994 and won in 2009.

As a Central League team, Wellington Olympic entered the tournament in round 2. They began their campaign with a 4–0 home win over Seatoun with a brace from Kaelin Nguyen and goals from Joel Coustrain and Oliver Davies. They next recorded a 5–0 home win over Western Suburbs at Wakefield Park with two goals for United from Coustrain, plus goals from Ben Mata, Jack-Henry Sinclair and Isa Prins. In round 4, Olympic hosted and defeated Stop Out Sports Club 8–0 with hat-tricks coming from Mata and Gianni Bouzoukis along with goals from Isa Prins and Edward Wilkinson.

In the quarter-finals, Olympic defeated Manurewa 4–0 at their home ground, Wakefield Park with a brace from Hamish Watson and goals from Ben Mata and Kaelin Nguyen.

In the semi-final match, held at Coastal Spirit's Linfield Park in Christchurch, Olympic won 5–1. Watson grabbed another brace, while Sinclair and Prins also bagged a goal each.

=== Auckland City ===
Auckland City's route to the final
Round	Opposition	Score
2	Metro (H)	5–0
3	Hamilton Wanderers (H)	2–1
4	Cambridge (A)	4–1
QF	Otago University (A)	5–1
SF	Birkenhead United (H)	4–2 (a.e.t.)
Key: (H) = Home venue; (A) = Away venue

This was Auckland City's second final. The club previously won in 2022.

Auckland City also entered the tournament in round 2, as a Northern League team. They began with a 5–0 home victory over Metro at Kiwitea Street with two goals for City from Cam Howieson, and one each from Gerard Garriga, Ryan de Vries and Angus Kilkolly. They then defeated Hamilton Wanderers at home in round 3 in a 2–1 victory with goals for City from Liam Gillion and Angus Kilkolly. In round 4, they beat Cambridge 4–1 away at John Kerkhof Park with a goal each from Gerard Garriga, Christian Gray, Angus Kilkolly and Regont Murati.

In the quarter-final match, Auckland City faced Otago University at Logan Park, Dunedin, where they came out 5–1 winners, with a hat-trick for City from Angus Kilkolly, a goal from Derek Tieku, and an own goal from Milo McBride. In the semi-final match, held at Kiwitea Street, Auckland City defeated Birkenhead United 4–2 after extra time to qualify for their second Chatham Cup final with another hat-trick from Angus Kilkolly and a goal from Ryan de Vries.

== Pre-match ==
New Zealand Football confirmed that the 2024 final would begin at 19:00, a change from the usual afternoon kick-off time so as not to clash with local football.

=== Broadcasting ===
The final was shown live on FIFA+.

== Match ==
=== Summary ===
After a goalless first half, Wellington Olympic took the lead in the 77th minute through a Nathan Lobo own goal. Derek Tieku and Isa Prins also scored goals in added time but these were both ruled out for offside. In the 6th minute of added time Stipe Ukich headed in an equalizer from a Joe Lee cross to take the game to extra time. After a few chances in extra time the score was left unchanged at 1–1. Wellington Olympic scored all of their penalties and won after Scott Basalaj saved Tong Zhou's retaken penalty.

=== Details ===
7 September 2024
19:00

Wellington Olympic	1–1	Auckland City
Lobo 77' (o.g.)	Report	Ukich 90+6'
Penalties
Mata (penalty scored); Gulley (penalty scored); Prins (penalty scored); Hoy (penalty scored); Watson (penalty scored)	5–4	(penalty scored) Heijer; (penalty scored) Ukich; (penalty scored) Ilich; (penalty scored) Tieku; (penalty missed) Zhou

North Harbour Stadium, Auckland
Referee: Luke Gardner

Wellington Olympic	Auckland City

GK	1	(New Zealand) Scott Basalaj
RB	15	(Cook Islands) Ben Mata (c)
CB	5	(New Zealand) Justin Gulley
CB	8	(New Zealand) Jonty Roubos	(yellow card) 107'
LB	3	(New Zealand) Adam Supyk		(substituted off) 91'
CM	6	(New Zealand) Luke Tongue		(substituted off) 62'
CM	11	(New Zealand) Edward Wilkinson		(substituted off) 83'
CM	20	(New Zealand) Tamupiwa Dimairo	(yellow card) 90+9'
RW	14	(New Zealand) Jack-Henry Sinclair		(substituted off) 106'
CF	10	(New Zealand) Gianni Bouzoukis		(substituted off) 73'
LW	9	(New Zealand) Hamish Watson
Substitutes:
GK	41	(New Zealand) Matthew King
DF	2	(Fiji) Gabiriele Matanisiga
MF	23	(Canada) Gavin Hoy		(substituted on) 62'
MF	25	(Republic of Ireland) Joel Coustrain		(substituted on) 106'
MF	26	(New Zealand) Isa Prins	(yellow card) 80'	(substituted on) 73'
MF	28	(New Zealand) William Vincent		(substituted on) 91'
FW	7	(New Zealand) Kaelin Nguyen		(substituted on) 83'
Manager:
(Barbados) Paul Ifill

GK	1	(New Zealand) Conor Tracey
RB	3	(New Zealand) Adam Mitchell (c)
CB	25	(New Zealand) Michael den Heijer	(yellow card) 90+5'
CB	12	(New Zealand) Regont Murati		(substituted off) 80'
LB	13	(New Zealand) Nathan Lobo		(substituted off) 90+2'
CM	6	(England) Kailan Gould		(substituted off) 80'
CM	16	(New Zealand) Joseph Lee		(substituted off) 95'
CM	8	(Spain) Gerard Garriga
RW	27	(New Zealand) Stipe Ukich
CF	11	(New Zealand) Ryan De Vries
LW	9	(New Zealand) Angus Kilkolly	(yellow card) 90+6'	(substituted off) 86'
Substitutes:
GK	18	(New Zealand) Areya Prasad
DF	4	(New Zealand) Christian Gray		(substituted on) 95'
DF	21	(New Zealand) Adam Bell
DF	22	(China) Tong Zhou		(substituted on) 80'
MF	2	(New Zealand) Mario Ilich		(substituted on) 80'
MF	23	(New Zealand) Matt Matanyayire		(substituted on) 90+2'
FW	20	(Ghana) Derek Tieku		(substituted on) 86'
Manager:
(Spain) Albert Riera

Man of the Match:
Stipe Ukich (Auckland City)

Assistant referees:
Isaac Trevis
Ashton Davenport
Fourth official:
Riley Greenbury

Match rules

- 90 minutes
- 30 minutes of extra time if necessary
- Penalty shoot-out if scores still level
- Nine named substitutes
- Maximum of five substitutions, with a sixth allowed in extra time (Note: Each team was given only three opportunities to make substitutions, with a fourth opportunity in extra time, excluding substitutions made at half-time, before the start of extra time and at half-time in extra time.)

== Post-match ==
Following the match, Albert Riera was happy with the way City conducted themselves throughout the match stating: "I am extremely happy to be fair. Obviously I am sad like the players that we've lost this final. But the way we played this game without speculating, going at them, controlling a lot of good things against a very dangerous team... we've been fantastic. I'm very proud of them." He also addressed that he has been in Zhou's position, missing the decisive penalty in the 2017 Chatham Cup final.

With his team's victory, Paul Ifill won back to back Chatham Cup's after winning on penalties with Christchurch United last year.
