= 2024 Auckland City FC season =

Football club season

Auckland City
2024 season
- Chairman: Ivan Vuksich
- Manager: Albert Riera
- Stadium: Kiwitea Street
- Northern League: 1st
- New Zealand National League: 2nd
- National League Final: Winners
- Chatham Cup: Runners-up
- OFC Men's Champions League: Winners
- FIFA Intercontinental Cup: First Round
- Top goalscorer: League: Liam Gillion (10); All: Angus Kilkolly (18)
- Highest home attendance: 300 vs Wellington Olympic (9 March 2024); OFC Men's Champions League
- Biggest win: 5–0 vs Solomon Warriors (N), 17 May 2024, OFC Men's Champions League; 5–0 vs Metro (H), 1 June 2024, Chatham Cup; 5–0 vs Tauranga City (A), 29 June 2024, Northern League
- Biggest defeat: 2–6 vs Al Ain (A), 22 September 2024, FIFA Intercontinental Cup
Home colours	Away colours	Third colours

The 2024 season was the 21st in the history of Auckland City Football Club. In addition to the domestic league, the club is participating in the Chatham Cup for the fourth time and the OFC Men's Champions League for the 19th time. They also qualified and participated in the inaugural edition of the FIFA Intercontinental Cup by winning the OFC Men's Champions League.

== Overview ==
=== Pre-season ===
Auckland City began their preseason fixtures with a 1–0 loss to Birkenhead United at the Croatian Cultural Club. The following day the club announced the signing of former England youth international Joe Ridley.

On 21 February 2024, City got their first win of pre-season, defeating West Coast Rangers 3–1 at the Croatian Cultural Club. City grabbed their second win in the same week with a 3–2 win over Eastern Suburbs after being two behind at half time.

City finished their pre-season with a 2–0 win over Manurewa on 2 March 2024.

=== Northern League ===
The league fixtures were announced on 1 March 2024. City play the season opener against local rivals Auckland United in the Dominion Road Derby, and finish the season away at Melville United.

City had a strong start to the season winning their first 5 games, conceding just 6 goals. In their round 9 fixture against Bay Olympic that was brought forward, they suffered their first Northern League defeat since 2022 in what was Albert Riera's 100th game in charge.

=== National League ===
City qualified for the National League on 7 August after beating Birkenhead United 3–1. After beating Coastal Spirit 5–1 in the final round City finished second and qualified for the Grand Final. The Navy Blues won the Grand Final after beating Birkenhead United 2–1 after extra time.

=== Chatham Cup ===
As a Northern League side, City received a bye to Round 2 of the Chatham Cup. The Navy Blues were drawn at home to NRFL Championship side Metro in Round 2.

After downing Metro 5–0 in Round 2, City were drawn at home to fellow Northern League side Hamilton Wanderers in Round 3. City beat Hamilton 2–1 thanks to goals from Liam Gillion and Angus Kilkolly.

In Round 4 City were drawn away to NRFL Southern Conference leaders Cambridge. The Navy Blues were able to overcome Cambridge with a 4–1 win qualifying for the quarter-finals.

City were drawn away to Southern Premier League side Otago University in the quarter-final draw. The Navy Blues won the match 5–1, after the match was delayed when the floodlights went out less than a minute after kick-off.

In the semi-finals, City were drawn home to fellow Northern League side Birkenhead United. In the match, City defeated Birkenhead 4–2 after extra time to qualify for their second Chatham Cup final.

Auckland City were drawn away to Wellington Olympic, where the match was played at North Harbour Stadium in Auckland. After a goalless first half, Wellington Olympic took the lead in the 77th minute through an own goal from Nathan Lobo. Stipe Ukich scored an equalizer in the 6th minute of injury time to take the game to extra time. After extra time the score was left unchanged at 1–1. The Navy Blues lost 5–4 on penalties after Tong Zhou's penalty was saved.

=== OFC Men's Champions League ===
Auckland City qualified for the 2023 Grand Final on 4 November 2023 after their National League win vs Petone. As the two finalists qualify for the OFC Men's Champions League play-offs this meant they also qualified for the 2024 OFC Men's Champions League. Wellington Olympic qualified on 10 November 2023 after Christchurch United lost to rivals Cashmere Technical. This meant Auckland City would face Wellington Olympic in the National play-offs.

The draw for the group stage took place on 17 January 2024 at OFC Home of Football in Auckland, New Zealand. The winner of the play-off between City and Wellington Olympic would face the play-off winners from Solomon Islands, Papua New Guinea, and Fiji in Group A.

Auckland City announced their Champions League squad on 8 March 2024.

City started their competitive fixtures off with a 1–0 win over Wellington Olympic in the first league of the National play-offs. Stipe Ukich came off the bench to put City in front after 72 minutes, after receiving a ball down the left side from Nathan Lobo. After winning the first leg at home, City only required a draw in the return leg in Wellington. Hamish Watson gave Olympic a lead in the 20th minute after he gained the ball from Vale's header, finishing into the bottom corner. Jesse Randall doubled their lead within 3 minutes, giving them the advantage in the tie. Mario Ilich pulled one back for City, before Watson restored the advantage a minute later. It took Murati three minutes into the second half to tie the aggregate score again, before Cam Howieson found the winner with eight minutes to go. The win for City sees them compete in the group stages for the 19 consecutive season since they first entered the competition. The win also saw them win back the Mediterranean Cup, a cup contested between City and Olympic acknowledging their Croatian and Greek roots.

City were drawn into a group with Fiji's Rewa, Papua New Guinea's Hekari United and Solomon Warriors of the Solomon Islands. After drawing with Rewa in their opening game, City bounced back with a 1–0 win over Hekari United and a 5–0 win over Solomon Warriors to finish top of their group on goal difference. As group winners they played runners-up of Group B, AS Magenta. After heading in to the break scoreless, Stipe Ukich calmy slotted the ball into the far corner in the 66th minute to give City a 1–0 win. This win meant they qualified for the final where they would face Pirae. This was a replay of City's first Oceanian final in 2006, when they faced Pirae at North Harbour Stadium.

City got off to a quick start in the final taking the lead through a Michael den Heijer goal in the 6th minute. Liam Gillion doubled the lead just before half time, with Stipe Ukich and Christian Gray also finding the back of the net in the second half to give City a 4–0 win in the final. This is a record-extending 12th OFC Men's Champions League title for City and their third consecutive.

=== FIFA Intercontinental Cup ===
As winners of the 2024 OFC Men's Champions League, City qualified for the first edition of the FIFA Intercontinental Cup to be held in December. The Navy Blues played Al Ain of United Arab Emirates in the first round losing 6–2.

== Players ==
Players and squad numbers last updated on 5 September 2024.

Note: Flags indicate national team as defined under FIFA eligibility rules; some limited exceptions apply. Players may hold more than one non-FIFA nationality.

No.	Pos.	Nation	Player
1	GK	NZL	Conor Tracey
2	MF	NZL	Mario Ilich (captain)
3	DF	NZL	Adam Mitchell
4	DF	NZL	Christian Gray
5	DF	NZL	Marco Lorenz
6	FW	ENG	Kailan Gould
8	MF	ESP	Gerard Garriga
9	FW	NZL	Angus Kilkolly
10	FW	NZL	Dylan Manickum
11	FW	NZL	Ryan De Vries
12	DF	KOS	Regont Murati
13	DF	NZL	Nathan Lobo
14	DF	NZL	Jordan Vale

No.	Pos.	Nation	Player
15	MF	NZL	Caleb Moosbally
16	FW	NZL	Joseph Lee
17	FW	COL	Jerson Lagos
18	GK	FIJ	Areya Prasad
20	FW	GHA	Derek Tieku
21	DF	NZL	Adam Bell
22	DF	CHN	Zhou Tong
23	DF	NZL	Alfie Rogers
25	DF	NZL	Michael den Heijer
26	MF	NZL	Rayan Tayeb
27	FW	NZL	Stipe Ukich
—	DF	VAN	Timothy Boulet

== Management team ==
Staff last updated on 8 March 2024.

Position	Staff
Head coach	(Spain) Albert Riera
Assistant coach	(New Zealand) Ivan Vicelich
Goalkeeper coach	(Spain) Enaut Zubikarai
Technical	(Spain) Adrià Casals
Technical	(New Zealand) Jarrod Wallace
Physio	(New Zealand) Matt Payne

== Transfers ==
=== Transfers in ===
No.	Position	Player	Transferred from	Type/fee	Contract length	Date	Ref.
17	FW	(England) Joe Ridley	Unattached	Free transfer	1 year	18 February 2024	
	FW	(Fiji) Nabil Begg	(Fiji) Police	Free transfer	1 year	1 March 2024	
	FW	(New Zealand) Robert Tipelu	(New Zealand) Bay Olympic	Free transfer	1 year	March 2024	
6	FW	(England) Kailan Gould	(New Zealand) Wellington Olympic	Free transfer	6 months	31 May 2024	
28	MF	(Ghana) Derek Tieku	(New Zealand) Hamilton Wanderers	Free transfer	6 months	9 June 2024	
5	DF	(New Zealand) Marco Lorenz	(New Zealand) Western Springs	Free transfer	6 months	30 June 2024	
17	FW	(Colombia) Jerson Lagos	(New Zealand) Manurewa	Free transfer	6 months	30 June 2024	
7	FW	(New Zealand) Myer Bevan	(Canada) Cavalry	Free transfer	6 months	September 2024	
24	GK	(New Zealand) Nathan Garrow	(New Zealand) Auckland United	Free transfer	6 months	September 2024	
19	DF	(Japan) Yuki Aizu	(New Zealand) Auckland United	Free transfer	6 months	September 2024	
15	DF	(New Zealand) Aston Burns	(New Zealand) Fencibles United	Free transfer	6 months	September 2024	
	MF	(Japan) Kentaro Ozaki	(New Zealand) Manurewa	Free transfer	6 months	September 2024	

=== Transfers out ===
No.	Position	Player	Transferred to	Type/fee	Date	Ref.
20	FW	(Argentina) Emiliano Tade	(New Zealand) Western Springs	End of contract	15 December 2023	
25	DF	(Japan) Takuya Iwata	(New Zealand) Western Springs	End of contract	1 January 2024	
	FW	(Vanuatu) Jordy Tasip	(Vanuatu) Ifira Black Bird	End of contract	1 January 2024	
15	MF	(New Zealand) Aidan Carey	(New Zealand) Western Springs	End of contract	7 January 2024	
17	FW	(New Zealand) Oliver Colloty	(New Zealand) Wellington Olympic	End of contract	22 January 2024	
7	MF	(New Zealand) Cameron Howieson	(New Zealand) Auckland FC	Free transfer	30 May 2024	
19	FW	(New Zealand) Liam Gillion	(New Zealand) Auckland FC	Free transfer	19 June 2024	
17	FW	(England) Joe Ridley	(Australia) Caroline Springs George Cross	Free transfer	9 July 2024	
24	GK	(New Zealand) Joe Wallis	(England) West Bromwich Albion U21	Undisclosed	5 September 2024	

== Pre-season and friendlies ==
17 February 2024	Auckland City	0–1	Birkenhead United	Te Atatū South
11:00		Report (NZF); Report (AFC)	Phillip	Stadium: Croatian Cultural Club; Referee: Nick Waldron

21 February 2024	Auckland City	3–1	West Coast Rangers	Te Atatū South
19:00	Murati 37'; Lee 55'; Ukich 80'	Report (NZF); Report (AFC)	Mitchell 25' (o.g.)	Stadium: Croatian Cultural Club; Referee: Luke Gardner

24 February 2024	Auckland City	3–2	Eastern Suburbs	Te Atatū South
09:30	Ukich 56'; Kilkolly 72', 81'	Report (NZF); Report (AFC)	Toomey 8'; Feutz 28'	Stadium: Croatian Cultural Club; Referee: Jack Henderson

2 March 2024	Auckland City	2–0	Manurewa	Te Atatū South
11:00	Lee; Ridley (pen.)	Report (NZF); Report (AFC)		Stadium: Croatian Cultural Club; Referee: Reza Al Rabea

18 September 2024	Arabian Falcons (United Arab Emirates)	1–2	(New Zealand) Auckland City	Dubai
		Report		Attendance: 0 (Behind closed doors)

== Competitions ==
=== Overall record ===
Competition	First match	Last match	Starting round	Final position	Record							
Competition	First match	Last match	Starting round	Final position	Pld	W	D	L	GF	GA	GD	Win %
Northern League	22 March 2024	31 August 2024	Matchday 1	Winners	22	16	3	3	53	21	+32	72.73
National League	29 September 2024	24 November 2024	Matchday 1	2nd	9	6	1	2	20	10	+10	66.67
National League Final	1 December 2024		Final	Winners	1	1	0	0	2	1	+1	100.00
Chatham Cup	1 June 2024	7 September 2024	Round 2	Runners-up	6	5	1	0	21	6	+15	83.33
OFC Men's Champions League	9 March 2024	24 May 2024	National play-offs	Winners	7	5	2	0	17	5	+12	71.43
FIFA Intercontinental Cup	22 September 2024		First Round	First Round	1	0	0	1	2	6	−4	0.00
Total					46	33	7	6	115	49	+66	71.74

Source: Soccerway

=== Northern League ===
==== League table ====
Pos	Team	Pld	W	D	L	GF	GA	GD	Pts	Qualification
1	Auckland City (C)	22	16	3	3	53	21	+32	51	Winner of Northern League and qualification to National League Championship
2	Western Springs	22	14	4	4	52	30	+22	46	Qualification to National League Championship
3	Eastern Suburbs	22	14	2	6	38	20	+18	44	Qualification to National League Championship
4	Birkenhead United	22	13	4	5	54	31	+23	43	Qualification to National League Championship
5	Auckland United	22	12	4	6	39	27	+12	40	

Source: NRF
Rules for classification: 1) Points; 2) Goal difference; 3) Goals scored; 4) Goals against; 5) Head to head; 6) Disciplinary record; 7) Coin toss
(C) Champions

==== Results summary ====
Overall								Home						Away					
Pld	W	D	L	GF	GA	GD	Pts	W	D	L	GF	GA	GD	W	D	L	GF	GA	GD
22	16	3	3	53	21	+32	51	8	2	1	24	12	+12	8	1	2	29	9	+20

Last updated: 31 August 2024.
Source: Ultimate NZ Soccer

==== Results by round ====
Round	1	2	3	4	5	6	9^{1}	7	8	12	13	14	11^{2}	15	10^{3}	16	21^{4}	18	20^{5}	19	17^{4}	22
Ground	A	H	H	A	A	H	H	H	A	H	A	A	H	H	H	A	H	A	H	A	A	A
Result	W	W	W	W	W	W	L	W	W	D	L	W	W	W	D	D	W	W	W	W	L	W
Position	2	1	1	1	2	1	1	1	1	2	4	2	2	1	1	2	2	1	1	1	1	1
Points	3	6	9	12	15	18	18	21	24	25	25	28	31	34	35	36	39	42	45	48	48	51

Source: Ultimate NZ Soccer
A = Away; H = Home; N = Neutral; W = Win; D = Draw; L = Loss
Notes:
- ^{1} Matchday 9 (vs Bay Olympic) was moved due to Auckland City's participation in the OFC Men's Champions League.
- ^{2} Matchday 11 (vs Manurewa) was moved due to Auckland City's participation in the OFC Men's Champions League.
- ^{3} Matchday 10 (vs Birkenhead United) was moved due to Auckland City's participation in the OFC Men's Champions League.
- ^{4} Matchday 17 (vs Manurewa) was swapped with Matchday 21 (vs West Coast Rangers) for the entire league.
- ^{5} Matchday 20 (vs Birkenhead United) was moved due to Auckland City and Birkenhead United's participation in the Chatham Cup.

==== Matches ====
Win Draw Loss Fixtures

22 March 2024 1	Auckland United	0–3	Auckland City	Mount Roskill
19:15 NZDT	Atkinson (yellow card) 55'; Curry (yellow card) 78'	Report	Zhou 15'; Gillion 22'; den Heijer (yellow card) 44'; Gray (yellow card) 67'; de Vries 79'	Stadium: Keith Hay Park; Referee: Riley Greenbury

29 March 2024 2	Auckland City	1–0	Eastern Suburbs	Te Atatū South
15:00 NZDT	Gillion 45+1'	Report	Mechell (yellow card) 25'; Verney (yellow card) 45'; Raj (yellow card) 81'; Strong (yellow card) 90+5'	Stadium: Croatian Cultural Club; Referee: Nick Waldron
Note: Originally to be held at Madills Farm. Fixture reversed with round 13.

1 April 2024 3	Auckland City	3–1	Tauranga City	Sandringham
15:00 NZDT	de Vries 25' (pen.) (yellow card) 61'; Mitchell (yellow card) 40'; Lee 80' (pen.); Ukich 90+4'	Report	Glover (yellow card) 79'; Bidois 83' (pen.); McMullan (yellow card) 90+1'; Hawkins (yellow card) 90+4'	Stadium: Kiwitea Street; Referee: Andres Castro

6 April 2024 4	Hamilton Wanderers	2–5	Auckland City	Hamilton
17:30 NZDT	Sas 5'; Marsh (yellow card) 37'; Clout (yellow card) 38'; Tieku 65'	Report	Gillion 31', 38'; Lee 34'; Ilich 43' (yellow card) 90+3'; Kilkolly 88'	Stadium: Porritt Stadium; Referee: Benjamin Norman

12 April 2024 5	West Coast Rangers	0–3	Auckland City	Whenuapai
19:30 NZST	Wood (yellow card) 47'; Burfoot (yellow card) 61'; Nevin (yellow card) 75'	Report	den Heijer (yellow card) 64'; Gillion 68'; Murati 86'; Manickum 90+2'	Stadium: Fred Taylor Park; Referee: Stephen Merriman

20 April 2024 6	Auckland City	7–3	Melville United	Sandringham
15:00 NZST	Lee 5'; Garriga 23', 36', 58'; Manickum 32'; Gillion 54'; Kilkolly 70'	Report	Oakman 6'; Gray 14' (o.g.); Knox (yellow card) 15'; Noon (yellow card) 32'; Cave 90'	Stadium: Kiwitea Street; Referee: Nick Waldron

24 April 2024 9	Auckland City	0–1	Bay Olympic	Te Atatū South
19:30 NZST	Kilkolly (yellow card) 68'; Bell (yellow card) 90'	Report	Munoz 5'; Naggar (yellow card) 50'; Kostandini Ziu (yellow card) 81'	Stadium: Croatian Cultural Club; Referee: Ashley Wilson
Note: Originally scheduled for 11 May 2024. Rescheduled due to Auckland City's participation in the OFC Men's Champions League.

27 April 2024 7	Auckland City	2–1	Western Springs	Sandringham
15:00 NZST	Gillion 32'; Lobo (yellow card) 40'; Ilich (yellow card) 45+1'; de Vries 87'	Report	J. Manuel (yellow card) 52'; R. Manuel 68'	Stadium: Kiwitea Street; Referee: Cory Mills

4 May 2024 8	East Coast Bays	0–3	Auckland City	Oteha
15:00 NZST		Report	de Vries 22', 83'; Gillion 90'	Stadium: Bay City Park; Referee: Jack Henderson

8 June 2024 12	Auckland City	0–0	Auckland United	Sandringham
15:00 NZST	Ukich (yellow card) 83'; Garriga (yellow card) 90+2'	Report	Curry (yellow card) 15'; Fay (yellow card) 90+5'; Callinan (yellow card) 90+6'	Stadium: Kiwitea Street; Referee: Luke Gardner

22 June 2024 13	Eastern Suburbs	1–0	Auckland City	Kohimarama
15:00 NZST	Mechell 7'; Boxall (yellow card) 53'; Laing-McConnell (yellow card) 85'; Strong (yellow card) 87'	Report	Bell (yellow card) 10'; Gray (yellow card) 61'; Ilich (yellow card) 88'; Rogers (yellow card) 90+4'	Stadium: Madills Farm; Referee: Riley Greenbury
Note: Originally to be held at Kiwitea Street. Fixture reversed with round 2.

29 June 2024 14	Tauranga City	0–5	Auckland City	Mount Maunganui
15:00 NZST		Report	Tieku 7'; Gould 9'; Gillion 45+1'; de Vries 75'; Murati 89'	Stadium: Links Avenue Reserve; Referee: Benjamin NormNan

3 July 2024 11	Auckland City	3–2	Manurewa	Te Atatū South
19:30 NZST	Rogers 13', 45+1'; Garriga 66'	Report	Eng 48'; Ramirez 71' (yellow card) 75'; Muzakkir-Nabeel (yellow card) 76'	Stadium: Croatian Cultural Club; Referee: Jack Henderson
Note: Originally scheduled for 25 May 2024 and to be held at Manurewa War Memorial Park. Rescheduled due to Auckland City's participation in the OFC Men's Champions League. Fixture reversed with round 17.

13 July 2024 15	Auckland City	1–0	East Coast Bays	Sandringham
15:00 NZST	Tieku (yellow card) 65'; Murati 76'	Report	Akimana (yellow card) 35'; Nkoy (yellow card) 90+5'	Stadium: Kiwitea Street; Referee: Kirk Davis

17 July 2024 10	Auckland City	2–2	Birkenhead United	Te Atatū South
19:30 NZST	Gray 62'; Murati 87'	Report	Patterson 4', 29'; Zeb (yellow card) 10'; Botica (yellow card) 16'; Piper (yellow card) 58'; Lindsay (yellow card) 71'	Stadium: Croatian Cultural Club; Referee: Ashley Wilson
Note: Originally scheduled for 18 May 2024. Rescheduled due to Auckland City's participation in the OFC Men's Champions League.

20 July 2024 16	Western Springs	1–1	Auckland City	Western Springs
17:30 NZST	McGavin 81'	Report	Lorenz (yellow card) 21'; Gould 36'; Lagos (yellow card) 40'; den Heijer (yellow card) 78'	Stadium: Seddon Fields; Referee: Andres Castro

24 July 2024 21	Auckland City	2–1	West Coast Rangers	Te Atatū South
19:00 NZST	Zhou 27'; Tracey (red card) 31'; Ukich (yellow card) 44'; Kilkolly (yellow card) 65'; Murati 90+4'	Report	Death 45'; Forrester (yellow card) 63'; Alama (yellow card) 65'; Pokhrel (yellow card) 90+2'	Stadium: Croatian Cultural Club; Referee: Luke Gardner
Note: Round 17 and round 21 swapped for the entire league. Rescheduled due to Auckland City's participation in the Chatham Cup.

3 August 2024 18	Bay Olympic	0–2	Auckland City	New Lynn
17:30 NZST	Kostandini Ziu (yellow card) 60'; Stephan (yellow card) 78'; Bailey (yellow card) 79'	Report	Lagos 89'; de Vries 90+5'	Stadium: Olympic Park; Referee: Nick Waldron

7 August 2024 20	Birkenhead United	1–3	Auckland City	Beach Haven
19:00 NZST	McArthur (yellow card) 34'; Botica 83'	Report	Ukich 15'; Mitchell 40'; Gould 77'; Lobo (yellow card) 80'	Stadium: Shepherds Park; Referee: Riley Greenbury
Note: Originally scheduled for 16 August 2024. Rescheduled due to Auckland City and Birkenhead United's participation in the Chatham Cup.

10 August 2024 19	Auckland City	3–1	Hamilton Wanderers	Sandringham
15:00 NZST	Messenger 14' (o.g.); Kilkolly 86'; de Vries 90+3'; Den Heijer (yellow card) 90+6'	Report	Messenger 83'	Stadium: Kiwitea Street; Referee: Ashley Wilson

24 August 2024 17	Manurewa	1–2	Auckland City	Manurewa
15:00 NZST	Ozaki 3'; Ramírez 45+2' (pen.); Morris (yellow card) 57'; Sakashita (yellow card) 63'	Report	Kilkolly 45+1' (pen.)	Stadium: Manurewa War Memorial Park; Referee: Caleb Downes
Note: Fixture reversed with round 11. Round 17 and round 21 swapped for the entire league.

31 August 2024 22	Melville United	2–3	Auckland City	Hamilton
15:00 NZST	Bates (yellow card) 67'; Panzer 90+2'; Brown 90+3'	Report	Lee 60'; Tieku 63', 71'	Stadium: Gower Park; Referee: Benjamin Norman

=== National League ===
==== League table ====
Pos	Team	Pld	W	D	L	GF	GA	GD	Pts	Qualification
1	Birkenhead United	9	6	2	1	23	16	+7	20	Qualification to Grand Final
2	Auckland City (C)	9	6	1	2	20	10	+10	19	Qualification to Grand Final and Champions League group stage
3	Western Springs	9	6	0	3	25	16	+9	18	
4	Napier City Rovers	9	5	2	2	21	14	+7	17	
5	Wellington Phoenix Reserves (Note: Wellington Phoenix Reserves can not qualify for the Grand Final.)	9	4	1	4	16	19	−3	13	

Source: New Zealand Football
Rules for classification: 1) Points; 2) Goal difference; 3) Goals for; 4) Goals against; 5) Head to head; 6) Disciplinary record
(C) Champions

==== Results summary ====
Overall								Home						Away					
Pld	W	D	L	GF	GA	GD	Pts	W	D	L	GF	GA	GD	W	D	L	GF	GA	GD
9	6	1	2	20	10	+10	19	2	1	2	13	9	+4	4	0	0	7	1	+6

Last updated: 24 November 2024.
Source: Ultimate NZ Soccer

==== Results by round ====
Round	1	2	3	4	5	6	7	8	9
Ground	H	A	H	A	A	H	H	A	H
Result	W	W	D	W	W	L	L	W	W
Position	3	1	1	1	1	1	3	2	2
Points	3	6	7	10	13	13	13	16	19

Updated to match(es) played on 24 November 2024. Source: Ultimate NZ Soccer
A = Away; H = Home; N = Neutral; W = Win; D = Draw; L = Loss

==== Matches ====
Win Draw Loss Fixtures

29 September 2024 1	Auckland City	3–1	Birkenhead United	Sandringham
14:00 NZDT	Kilkolly 44' (pen.); de Vries 53'; Ukich 60'	Report	Rodwell (yellow card) 38'; Botica (yellow card) 43'; McArthur 57'	Stadium: Kiwitea Street; Referee: Calvin-kei Berg

5 October 2024 2	Wellington Olympic	0–1	Auckland City	Wellington
15:00 NZDT	Sinclair (yellow card) 37'	Report	Ukich 7' (yellow card) 67'; Mitchell (yellow card) 65'	Stadium: Martin Luckie Park; Referee: Campbell-kirk Kawana-Waugh

13 October 2024 3	Auckland City	1–1	Cashmere Technical	Sandringham
14:00 NZDT	Mitchell (yellow card) 55'; Bevan 72' (pen.) (yellow card) 90+3'	Report	Taguchi 22'	Stadium: Kiwitea Street; Referee: Chris Bennett

20 October 2024 4	Western Suburbs	1–2	Auckland City	Wellington
13:30 NZDT	Fautley (yellow card) 17'; Meek 20' (pen.); Mackenzie (yellow card) 48'; Roberts (red card) 50'; Scott (yellow card) 62'	Report	Mitchell 4'; Ukich (yellow card) 47'; Bevan 52' (pen.); Ilich (yellow card) 89'	Stadium: Endeavour Park; Referee: Caleb Downes

27 October 2024 5	Eastern Suburbs	0–3	Auckland City	Kohimarama
13:00 NZDT	Jarvie (yellow card) 77'; Laing-McConnell (yellow card) 90+7'	Report	Bevan 73'; Ilich 79'; Kilkolly 90+5'	Stadium: Madills Farm; Referee: Luke Gardner

3 November 2024 6	Auckland City	1–2	Western Springs	Sandringham
14:00 NZDT	Lobo (yellow card) 59' (goal) 74'; Ilich (yellow card) 86'	Report	J. Manuel (yellow card) 57'; Gatkek (yellow card) 86'; Drake (yellow card) 86' (goal) 88'; Tobin 90+5'	Stadium: Kiwitea Street; Referee: Ben O'Connel

10 November 2024 7	Auckland City	3–4	Wellington Phoenix Reserves	Sandringham
14:00 NZDT	Kilkolly 72', 87' (yellow card); Bevan 77'; Lagos (yellow card) 89'	Report	Smith 4'; Sloane-Rodrigues 32', 35'; Ball (yellow card) 78'; Flowerdew 90+1'; Boon (yellow card) 90+4'	Stadium: Kiwitea Street; Referee: Luke Gardner

17 November 2024 8	Napier City Rovers	0–1	Auckland City	Napier
13:00 NZDT	Hoyle (yellow card) 15'; Andrew (yellow card) 16'; Jones (yellow card) 69'; Hewson (yellow card) 78'; Annear (yellow card) 86'	Report	Ukich (yellow card) 72' (goal) 90'; Kilkolly (yellow card) 81'; Aizu (yellow card) 84'; den Heijer (yellow card) 86'	Stadium: Bluewater Stadium; Referee: Martin Roil

24 November 2024 9	Auckland City	5–1	Coastal Spirit	Sandringham
14:00 NZDT	Bevan 18', 29', 21'; Manickum 65'; Ozaki 70'	Report	Yoo (yellow card) 8'; Adam Mitchell 62' (o.g.); Taqizada (yellow card) 71'; Hirano (yellow card) 73'; Cotter (yellow card) 90+6'	Stadium: Kiwitea Street; Referee: Hayden Tutbury

==== Grand Final ====
1 December 2024 Grand Final	Birkenhead United	1–2 (a.e.t.)	Auckland City	Albany
16:00 NZDT	Patterson 23' (yellow card) 120+1'; Zeb (yellow card) 45+2'; Botica (yellow card) 105'; Palmer (yellow card) 118' (yellow-red card) 120+4'	Source	Jorgensen 44' (o.g.); Mitchell (yellow card) 45+2'; Kilkolly 111'	Stadium: North Harbour Stadium; Attendance: 4,972; Referee: Calvin Berg

=== Chatham Cup ===
Win Draw Loss Fixtures

1 June 2024 Round 2	Auckland City	5–0	Metro	Sandringham
14:00 NZST	Howieson 8' (pen.), 67'; Garriga 12'; de Vries 58'; Kilkolly 90'	Report	Campbell (yellow card) 7'	Stadium: Kiwitea Street; Referee: Othmane Jebli

16 June 2024 Round 3	Auckland City	2–1	Hamilton Wanderers	Sandringham
14:00 NZST	Gillion 15'; Kilkolly 53'	Report	Campbell (yellow card) 44'; Brooke-Smith 63'	Stadium: Kiwitea Street; Referee: Nick Waldron

6 July 2024 Round 4	Cambridge	1–4	Auckland City	Cambridge
13:00 NZST	Clarkin 38' (yellow card) 72'	Report	Garriga 35'; Gray 45'; Kilkolly 53'; Lee (yellow card) 65'; Murati 80'	Stadium: John Kerkhof Park; Referee: Phillip Rogers

27 July 2024 Quarter-finals	Otago University	1–5	Auckland City	Dunedin North
18:00 NZST	Buyck 45+2'	Report	Kilkolly 34', 51', 87'; Tieku 41'; Bell (yellow card) 66'; McBride 89' (o.g.)	Stadium: Logan Park; Referee: Ben O'Connell

18 August 2024 Semi-finals	Auckland City	4–2 (a.e.t.)	Birkenhead United	Sandringham
14:00	den Heijer (yellow card) 6'; Mitchell (yellow card) 34'; Kilkolly 43' (pen.), 99', 120+4'; de Vries 56'; Garriga (yellow card) 88'; Ukich (yellow card) 89'; Zhou (yellow card) 116'	Report	Patterson 33'; Cromb (yellow card) 45'; Philip 68'; Botica (yellow card) 79'	Stadium: Kiwitea Street; Referee: Mark Rule

7 September 2024 Final	Wellington Olympic	1–1 (5–4 p)	Auckland City	Albany
19:00 NZST	Lobo 77' (o.g.); Prins (yellow card) 80'; Dimairo (yellow card) 90+9'; Roubos (yellow card) 107'	Report	Heijer (yellow card) 90+2'; Kilkolly (yellow card) 90+4'; Ukich 90+6'	Stadium: North Harbour Stadium; Referee: Luke Gardner
	Penalties
	Mata (penalty scored); Gulley (penalty scored); Prins (penalty scored); Hoy (penalty scored); Watson (penalty scored)		(penalty scored) Heijer; (penalty scored) Ukich; (penalty scored) Ilich; (penalty scored) Tieku; (penalty missed) Zhou

=== OFC Men's Champions League ===
==== National play-offs ====
9 March 2024 First leg	Auckland City (New Zealand)	1–0	(New Zealand) Wellington Olympic	Auckland, New Zealand
14:00 (UTC+13:00)	Ukich 72'	Report	Supyk (yellow card) 72'; Gulley (yellow card) 90+1'; Randall (yellow card) 90+6'	Stadium: Kiwitea Street; Attendance: 300; Referee: Calvin Berg (New Zealand)

16 March 2024 Second leg	Wellington Olympic (New Zealand)	3–3 (3–4 agg.)	(New Zealand) Auckland City	Wellington, New Zealand
14:00 (UTC+13:00)	Watson 20', 28'; Supyk (yellow card) 21'; Randall 23'; Mata (yellow card) 44'	Report	Ilich 27' (yellow card) 77'; Murati 48'; Howieson 81'; Ukich (yellow card) 87'	Stadium: Martin Luckie Park; Attendance: 200; Referee: Campbell-Kirk Kawana-Waugh (New Zealand)

==== Group stage ====
Pos	Team	Pld	W	D	L	GF	GA	GD	Pts	Qualification
1	(New Zealand) Auckland City	3	2	1	0	8	2	+6	7	Advance to knockout stage
2	(Fiji) Rewa	3	2	1	0	8	6	+2	7	Advance to knockout stage
3	(Papua New Guinea) Hekari United	3	1	0	2	4	4	0	3	
4	(Solomon Islands) Solomon Warriors	3	0	0	3	2	10	−8	0	

Source: OFC

11 May 2024 1	Rewa (Fiji)	2–2	(New Zealand) Auckland City	Pā'ea
15:00	Sela 62', 64'	Report	Gray (yellow card) 45+1'; Howieson 50'; de Vries 66'	Stadium: Stade Paea; Attendance: 105; Referee: Médéric Lacour (New Caledonia)

14 May 2024 2	Auckland City (New Zealand)	1–0	(Papua New Guinea) Hekari United	Pā'ea
15:00	Mitchell (yellow card) 88'; Gillion 90+3'	Report	Ani (yellow card) 45'; Haro (yellow card) 81'	Stadium: Stade Paea; Attendance: 101; Referee: Tim Danaskos (Australia)

17 May 2024 3	Auckland City (New Zealand)	5–0	(Solomon Islands) Solomon Warriors	Pā'ea
18:00	Manickum 40', 49', 61' (pen.); Ukich 66' (pen.); de Vries 75'	Report	Gagame (yellow card) 39'	Stadium: Stade Paea; Attendance: 105; Referee: Médéric Lacour (New Caledonia)

==== Knockout stage ====
===== Semi-final =====
22 May 2024 Semi-final	Auckland City (New Zealand)	1–0	(New Caledonia) AS Magenta	Pirae
14:00	Ukich 66'	Report	Watu (yellow card) 38'; Jewine (yellow card) 86' (red card) 86'	Stadium: Stade Pater; Attendance: 321; Referee: Norbert Hauata (Tahiti)

===== Final =====
24 May 2024 Final	Auckland City (New Zealand)	4–0	(French Polynesia) Pirae	Pirae
18:00 UTC−10	den Heijer 6'; Lobo (yellow card) 11'; Gillion 30'; Ukich (yellow card) 36' (goal) 48'; Gray 59' (yellow card) 90+3'	Report	Tehau (yellow card) 26'; Tau (yellow card) 33'	Stadium: Stade Pater; Attendance: 819; Referee: Ben Aukwai (Solomon Islands)

=== FIFA Intercontinental Cup ===
22 September 2024 First Round	Al Ain (United Arab Emirates)	6–2	(New Zealand) Auckland City	Al Ain
20:00 GST	Cardoso 6'; Gassama 11'; Palacios 45+1' (yellow card) 57'; Park (yellow card) 57'; Sanabria (yellow card) 58'; Traoré (yellow card) 66'; Rahimi 78', 90+4'; Al-Ahbabi (yellow card) 89'; Kaku 90+2'	Report	Lagos 43' (yellow card) 74'; Bevan 54'; Tieku (yellow card) 89'	Stadium: Hazza bin Zayed Stadium; Attendance: 13,826; Referee: Mustapha Ghorbal (Algeria)

== Statistics ==
=== Appearances and goals ===
Includes all competitions. One own goal scored in Northern League, National League and Chatham Cup.

As of 1 December 2024

No.	Pos	Nat	Player	Total		Northern League		National League		Chatham Cup		OFC Men's Champions League		FIFA Intercontinental Cup	
No.	Pos	Nat	Player	Apps	Goals	Apps	Goals	Apps	Goals	Apps	Goals	Apps	Goals	Apps	Goals
Goalkeepers:
1	GK	(New Zealand) NZL	Conor Tracey	32	0	14	0	7	0	3	0	7	0	1	0
18	GK	(Fiji) FIJ	Areya Prasad	2	0	1	0	0	0	1	0	0	0	0	0
24	GK	(New Zealand) NZL	Nathan Garrow	4	0	0	0	3+1	0	0	0	0	0	0	0
Defenders:
3	DF	(New Zealand) NZL	Adam Mitchell	37	2	12+5	1	10	1	4	0	5	0	1	0
4	DF	(New Zealand) NZL	Christian Gray	26	3	14+1	1	0	0	4+1	1	6	1	0	0
5	DF	(New Zealand) NZL	Marco Lorenz	12	0	7	0	4+1	0	0	0	0	0	0	0
12	DF	(Kosovo) KOS	Regont Murati	32	7	6+11	5	0+3	0	2+3	1	7	1	0	0
13	DF	(New Zealand) NZL	Nathan Lobo	39	1	17+1	0	7+1	1	5	0	7	0	1	0
14	DF	(New Zealand) NZL	Jordan Vale	2	0	0	0	0	0	0	0	2	0	0	0
15	DF	(New Zealand) NZL	Aston Burns	0	0	0	0	0	0	0	0	0	0	0	0
19	DF	(Japan) JPN	Yuki Aizu	4	0	0	0	3	0	0	0	0	0	0+1	0
21	DF	(New Zealand) NZL	Adam Bell	20	0	11+2	0	1+1	0	4	0	0+1	0	0	0
22	DF	(China) CHN	Zhou Tong	28	2	9+3	2	0+4	0	2+3	0	0+6	0	0+1	0
23	DF	(New Zealand) NZL	Alfie Rogers	23	2	11+5	2	0	0	4	0	1+2	0	0	0
25	DF	(New Zealand) NZL	Michael den Heijer	39	1	14+2	0	10	0	4+1	0	7	1	1	0
—	DF	(New Zealand) NZL	Jesse Gage	1	0	0+1	0	0	0	0	0	0	0	0	0
Midfielders:
2	MF	(New Zealand) NZL	Mario Ilich	32	3	14+2	1	10	1	2+1	0	2	1	1	0
8	MF	(Spain) ESP	Gerard Garriga	41	5	18+1	3	8+2	0	5	2	6	0	1	0
26	MF	(New Zealand) NZL	Rayan Tayeb	3	0	1	0	0	0	0+2	0	0	0	0	0
—	MF	(Japan) JPN	Kentaro Ozaki	10	1	0	0	4+6	1	0	0	0	0	0	0
—	MF	(New Zealand) NZL	Luka Vicelich	1	0	0+1	0	0	0	0	0	0	0	0	0
Forwards:
6	FW	(England) ENG	Kailan Gould	20	3	5+6	3	3+1	0	3+1	0	0	0	0+1	0
7	FW	(New Zealand) NZL	Myer Bevan	9	8	0	0	8	7	0	0	0	0	1	1
9	FW	(New Zealand) NZL	Angus Kilkolly	38	18	6+10	4	1+9	5	4+2	9	1+4	0	0+1	0
10	FW	(New Zealand) NZL	Dylan Manickum	31	6	7+3	2	9+1	1	3+1	0	7	3	0	0
11	FW	(New Zealand) NZL	Ryan De Vries	38	13	7+11	8	3+3	1	3+3	2	1+6	2	1	0
16	FW	(New Zealand) NZL	Joseph Lee	37	4	18+3	4	3+3	0	3+1	0	1+4	0	1	0
17	FW	(Colombia) COL	Jerson Lagos	19	2	7+2	1	9	0	0	0	0	0	1	1
20	FW	(Ghana) GHA	Derek Tieku	18	4	9+3	3	0+1	0	2+2	1	0	0	0+1	0
27	FW	(New Zealand) NZL	Stipe Ukich	38	10	13+3	2	7+3	3	3+2	1	3+3	4	1	0
—	FW	(New Zealand) NZL	Matthew Matanayire	4	0	1+1	0	0	0	0+2	0	0	0	0	0
Players who left during the season:
7	MF	(New Zealand) NZL	Cameron Howieson	11	4	2+1	0	0	0	1	2	7	2	0	0
17	FW	(England) ENG	Joe Ridley	1	0	0+1	0	0	0	0	0	0	0	0	0
19	FW	(New Zealand) NZL	Liam Gillion	21	13	11+1	10	0	0	2	1	7	2	0	0
24	GK	(New Zealand) NZL	Joe Wallis	9	0	7	0	0	0	2	0	0	0	0	0

- Source: Auckland City

=== Clean sheets ===
Includes all competitive matches. The list is sorted by squad number when total clean sheets are equal.

As of 1 December 2024

Rank	No.	Player	Northern League	National League	Chatham Cup	OFC Men's Champions League	FIFA Intercontinental Cup	Total
1	1	(New Zealand) Conor Tracey	4	3	0	5	0	12
2	24	(New Zealand) Joe Wallis	4	0	1	0	0	5
Total			8	3	1	5	0	17

=== Disciplinary record ===
Includes all competitions. The list is sorted by squad number when total cards are equal. Players with no cards not included in the list.

As of 1 December 2024

No.	Pos.	Name	Northern League			National League			Chatham Cup			OFC Men's Champions League			FIFA Intercontinental Cup			Total		
No.	Pos.	Name	Yellow card	Second yellow card	Red card	Yellow card	Second yellow card	Red card	Yellow card	Second yellow card	Red card	Yellow card	Second yellow card	Red card	Yellow card	Second yellow card	Red card	Yellow card	Second yellow card	Red card
1	GK	(New Zealand) Conor Tracey	0	0	1	0	0	0	0	0	0	0	0	0	0	0	0	0	0	1
27	FW	(New Zealand) Stipe Ukich	2	0	0	3	0	0	1	0	0	2	0	0	0	0	0	8	0	0
25	DF	(New Zealand) Michael den Heijer	4	0	0	1	0	0	2	0	0	0	0	0	0	0	0	7	0	0
2	MF	(New Zealand) Mario Ilich	3	0	0	2	0	0	0	0	0	1	0	0	0	0	0	6	0	0
3	DF	(New Zealand) Adam Mitchell	1	0	0	3	0	0	1	0	0	1	0	0	0	0	0	6	0	0
9	FW	(New Zealand) Angus Kilkolly	2	0	0	2	0	0	1	0	0	0	0	0	0	0	0	5	0	0
4	DF	(New Zealand) Christian Gray	2	0	0	0	0	0	0	0	0	2	0	0	0	0	0	4	0	0
13	DF	(New Zealand) Nathan Lobo	2	0	0	1	0	0	0	0	0	1	0	0	0	0	0	4	0	0
17	FW	(Colombia) Jerson Lagos	1	0	0	1	0	0	0	0	0	0	0	0	1	0	0	3	0	0
21	DF	(New Zealand) Adam Bell	2	0	0	0	0	0	1	0	0	0	0	0	0	0	0	3	0	0
8	MF	(Spain) Gerard Garriga	1	0	0	0	0	0	1	0	0	0	0	0	0	0	0	2	0	0
20	FW	(Ghana) Derek Tieku	1	0	0	0	0	0	0	0	0	0	0	0	1	0	0	2	0	0
5	DF	(New Zealand) Marco Lorenz	1	0	0	0	0	0	0	0	0	0	0	0	0	0	0	1	0	0
7	FW	(New Zealand) Myer Bevan	0	0	0	1	0	0	0	0	0	0	0	0	0	0	0	1	0	0
11	FW	(New Zealand) Ryan de Vries	1	0	0	0	0	0	0	0	0	0	0	0	0	0	0	1	0	0
16	DF	(New Zealand) Joseph Lee	0	0	0	0	0	0	1	0	0	0	0	0	0	0	0	1	0	0
19	FW	(Japan) Yuki Aizu	0	0	0	1	0	0	0	0	0	0	0	0	0	0	0	1	0	0
22	DF	(China) Zhou Tong	0	0	0	0	0	0	1	0	0	0	0	0	0	0	0	1	0	0
23	DF	(New Zealand) Alfie Rogers	1	0	0	0	0	0	0	0	0	0	0	0	0	0	0	1	0	0
Total			24	0	1	15	0	0	7	0	0	7	0	0	2	0	0	55	0	1

== Awards ==
=== Players ===
No.	Pos.	Player	Award	Source
1	GK	(New Zealand) Conor Tracey	OFC Men's Champions League Golden Glove	
1	GK	(New Zealand) Conor Tracey	National League Team of the Season	
2	MF	(New Zealand) Mario Ilich	National League Team of the Season	
19	FW	(New Zealand) Liam Gillion	OFC Men's Champions League Golden Ball	
25	DF	(New Zealand) Michael den Heijer	National League Team of the Season	
(New Zealand) Auckland City			OFC Men's Champions League Fair Play Award	
