= Nathan Garrow =

New Zealand footballer (born 2004)

Personal information
- Full name: Nathan Kyle Garrow
- Date of birth: 29 November 2004 (age 21)
- Place of birth: Cape Town, South Africa
- Height: 1.85 m (6 ft 1 in)
- Position: Goalkeeper

Team information
- Current team: Stellenbosch

Senior career*
Years	Team	Apps	(Gls)
–2021	Bucklands Beach		
2021–2023	Manukau United	11	(0)
2023–2024	Bay Olympic	16	(0)
2024	Auckland United	15	(0)
2024–2026	Auckland City	38	(0)
2026–	Stellenbosch	0	(0)
- * Club domestic league appearances and goals as of 14 July 2026

Nathan Kyle Garrow (born 29 November 2004) is a South African–New Zealander professional footballer who plays as a goalkeeper for South African Premiership side Stellenbosch.

== Career ==
After brief stints at Bay Olympic and Auckland United, Garrow signed for Auckland City ahead of the 2024 New Zealand National League.

In June 2025, Garrow was named in Auckland City's squad for the 2025 FIFA Club World Cup, the club's tenth appearance in the tournament. After remaining an unused substitute in their opening match against Bayern Munich, in which Auckland's first-choice goalkeeper Conor Tracey conceded 10 goals in a record 10–0 defeat, Garrow was given a chance to start in the club's second match against Benfica. In total, he made 10 saves and touched the ball 59 times, the most of any Auckland City player, holding out Benfica for 53 minutes before conceding a penalty from Ángel Di María in an eventual 6–0 loss. His 10 saves was the joint-most by a goalkeeper in a single game in the tournament, along with Jo Hyeon-woo and Thibaut Courtois. The Oceania Football Confederation website described this saves as "athletic and brave".

In their last group match against Boca Juniors on 24 June, Garrow became the first goalkeeper in Club World Cup history to score an own goal when a header bounced off the post and hit him in the 26th minute, inadvertently giving Boca the lead. He also made six saves to help Auckland to a 1–1 draw, their first non-defeated result since the 2014 edition as well as the most notable draw from a New Zealand team since the All Whites went unbeaten at the 2010 FIFA World Cup. In the days after his performance against Boca, Garrow gained close to 70,000 new followers on Instagram, mainly from Brazilians, the main football rivals of Argentina.

On 14 July 2026, Garrow joined South African Premiership side Stellenbosch.

== Personal life ==
Outside football, he studied civil engineering at the University of Auckland.

== Career statistics ==
As of 14 July 2026

Club	Season	League			National cup		Continental		Total	
Club	Season	Division	Apps	Goals	Apps	Goals	Apps	Goals	Apps	Goals
Manukau United	2021	National League	0	0	0	0	—		0	0
Manukau United	2022	National League	11	0	0	0	—		11	0
Manukau United	Total		11	0	0	0	0	0	11	0
Bay Olympic	2023	National League	16	0	1	0	—		17	0
Auckland United	2024	National League	15	0	1	0	—		16	0
Auckland City	2024	National League	4	0	0	0	0	0	4	0
Auckland City	2025	National League	22	0	1	0	5	0	28	0
Auckland City	2026	National League	12	0	0	0	0	0	12	0
Auckland City	Total		38	0	1	0	5	0	44	0
Stellenbosch	2026–27	SA Premiership	0	0	0	0	0	0	0	0
Career total			80	0	3	0	5	0	88	0

== Honours ==
Auckland City

- OFC Champions League: 2024, 2025
- New Zealand National League: 2024, 2025
