= Derek Tieku =

Ghanaian Football Player

Personal information
- Full name: Derek Safo Tieku
- Date of birth: 28 February 1995 (age 31)
- Place of birth: Berekum, Ghana
- Position: Forward

Team information
- Current team: Bay Olympic
- Number: 20

Youth career
- 2012–2013: Fulham
- 2013–2015: Crystal Palace

Senior career*
Years	Team	Apps	(Gls)
2013	→ Hayes & Yeading United (loan)	1	(0)
2013	Farnborough		
2015	Österlen FF	11	(1)
2015–2016	Chipstead		
2016–2018	Eastern Suburbs	49	(14)
2018–2023	Hamilton Wanderers	113	(58)
2023	Wellington Olympic	0	(0)
2024	Hamilton Wanderers	32	(25)
2024	Auckland City	13	(3)
2025	Bay Olympic	22	(9)
2025	Coastal Spirit	10	(3)
2026–	Bay Olympic	0	(0)
- * Club domestic league appearances and goals as of 6 December 2025

Derek Safo Tieku (born 28 February 1995) is a Ghanaian professional footballer who plays as a forward for Northern League club Bay Olympic.

== Club career ==
Born in Berekum, Ghana, Fulham scouted Tieku at a young age. He would continue his career with fellow rival London club Crystal Palace, moving to South London at the age of 17.

After a few seasons with the Eagles, including a loan to Hayes & Yeading, Tieku played for Farnborough in non-league before moving abroad in 2015 to join Swedish fourth-tier club Österlen FF, where he made 11 appearances.

=== Eastern Suburbs ===
Following his time in Sweden, Tieku joined Eastern Suburbs in New Zealand. On 30 October 2016, Tieku scored his first goal for the club during their inaugural season in the Stirling Sports Premiership, securing a 1–0 victory over Hawke's Bay United. He would conclude the season with one goal and two assists.

Tieku would score seven goals and make four assists in his second campaign during the 2017–18 season, securing a move to fellow Premiership side Hamilton Wanderers.

=== Hamilton Wanderers ===
Tieku would sign for Hamilton Wanderers for the 2018–19 season. Tieku's first season with Hamilton was relatively quiet as he adjusted to his new club, managing to score two goals and provide one assist.

Tieku would score eight goals and produce five assists in the 2019–20 season. Tieku would become the team's captain for the first time in the 2–1 loss against the reserve squad of A-League club Wellington Phoenix.

On 14 February, Tieku would play against the now defunct club Waitakere United. He would score his first goal of the game in the 54th minute, assisted by Xavier Pratt. Waitakere would then go on to score two goals. Tieku would then score again a goal in the 75th minute assisted by Tommy Semmy. In the fourth minute of stoppage time, with the score tied at 2–2, Tieku secured a win for Hamilton Wanderers with another goal, assisted by Agustín Contratti, completing his first hat-trick for the club and sealing a 3–2 victory.

Tieku scored 12 goals and assisted two before the 2020–21 season ending abruptly due to the COVID-19 pandemic in New Zealand.

In the first edition of the newly created National League replacing the ISPS Handa Men's Premiership, Tieku would score a further seven goals.

In the 2021–22 season, Tieku finished the season as the golden boot winner of the Northern League with an impressive 17 goals and one assist. His performances included a hat-trick and an assist in a 6–0 victory over North Shore United, followed by another hat-trick in a 5–0 win against the same team.

In the 2022–23 season, Tieku would share the golden boot with Ryan De Vries in the Northern League with an impressive 19 goals and one assist. His standout performances included a hat-trick in a 3–3 draw over Manurewa and six separate braces. His performance in the season earned him a move to Wellington Olympic, where he made his debut in a 1–1 draw against Auckland City in the first leg of the OFC Champions League qualifying round.

After only playing 24 minutes for the club during both legs of the qualifying round, Tieku would resign with Waikato side Wanderers ahead of the new 2023–24 season. He would score 6 goals for the club before transferring to Auckland City.

During his time at the club, Tieku would make a total of 153 appearances for the club, majority being team captain. He would become Hamilton Wanderers' all-time leading scorer, scoring a total of 93 goals, overtaking previous record holder Tommy Semmy. His performances in the 2021–22 and 2022–23 editions of the Northern League earned him the title of Two-Time Golden Boot Winner.

While playing for Wanderers, he also coached the women's first team in the NRFL Women's Championship.

=== Auckland City ===
On 1 June, Tieku would sign for Auckland City on a free transfer. He would make his debut in a 1–0 loss to his former club Eastern Suburbs as a substitute, coming on the 57th minute for Ryan De Vries. On 29 June, Tieku would open up the score with an 180 degree turn "no-look" goal in the 7th minute in a 5–0 victory over Tauranga City.

=== Bay Olympic ===
Tieku signed for Bay Olympic on 17 February 2025, for the 2025 Northern League.

=== Coastal Spirit ===
Coastal Spirit signed Tieku on 26 September 2025 for the 2025 New Zealand National League.

== Career statistics ==
=== Club ===
As of match played on 6 December 2025.

Appearances and goals by club, season and competition
Club	Season	League			Cup		Continental		Other		Total	
Club	Season	Division	Apps	Goals	Apps	Goals	Apps	Goals	Apps	Goals	Apps	Goals
Hayes & Yeading United (loan)	2013–14	Conference South	1	0	0	0	—		0	0	1	0
Österlen FF	2015	Division 2	11	1	0	0	—		0	0	11	1
Eastern Suburbs	2016–17	NZ Premiership	14	1	—		—		—		14	1
Eastern Suburbs	2017–18	NZ Premiership	18	7	—		—		1 (Note: Appearance in New Zealand Football Championship play-offs)	0	18	7
Eastern Suburbs	2018	NRFL Premier	17	6	1	1	—		—		18	7
Eastern Suburbs	Total		49	14	1	1	—		1	0	51	15
Hamilton Wanderers	2018–19	NZ Premiership	17	2	—		—		—		17	2
Hamilton Wanderers	2019	NRFL Premier	19	8	1	0	—		—		20	8
Hamilton Wanderers	2019–20	NZ Premiership	16	8	—		—		—		16	8
Hamilton Wanderers	2020	NRFL Premier	8	4	—		—		—		8	4
Hamilton Wanderers	2020–21	NZ Premiership	14	12	—		—		1	0	14	12
Hamilton Wanderers	2021	National League	17	7	3	3	—		—		20	10
Hamilton Wanderers	2022	National League	22	17	5	2	—		—		27	19
Hamilton Wanderers	Total		113	58	9	5	—		1	0	123	63
Wellington Olympic	2023	National League	0	0	0	0	1 (Note: Appearance in OFC Champions League)	0	—		1	0
Hamilton Wanderers	2023	National League	22	19	4	1	—		—		26	20
Hamilton Wanderers	2024	National League	10	6	0	0	—		—		10	6
Hamilton Wanderers	Total		32	25	4	1	—		—		36	26
Auckland City	2024	National League	13	3	4	1	—		1 (Note: Appearance in FIFA Intercontinental Cup)	0	26	20
Bay Olympic	2025	National League	22	9	1	1	—		—		23	10
Coastal Spirit	2025	National League	10	3	0	0	—		—		10	3
Career total			251	113	19	9	1	0	3	0	274	122

== Honours ==
Auckland City

- Northern League: 2024
- National League: 2024

Individual

- ISPS Handa Premiership Most Valuable Player: 2019–20
- ISPS Handa Premiership Team of the Season: 2019–20
- Northern League Most Valuable Player: 2022, 2023, 2025
- Northern League Golden Boot: 2022, 2023
