= Matthew Foord =

New Zealand soccer player (born 2006)

Matt Foord
Personal information
- Full name: Matthew Foord
- Date of birth: 19 February 2006 (age 20)
- Place of birth: New Zealand
- Height: 1.84 m (6 ft 0 in)
- Position: Midfielder

Team information
- Current team: Auckland City
- Number: 24

Youth career
- Christchurch United
- –2022: Cashmere Technical

Senior career*
Years	Team	Apps	(Gls)
2022–2024	Cashmere Technical	16	(0)
2024–2026	Wellington Phoenix Reserves	1	(0)
2026	Bula	4	(0)
2026–	Auckland City	8	(0)

International career^{‡}
2023	New Zealand U17	7	(0)
2023	New Zealand U20	1	(0)
- * Club domestic league appearances and goals as of 1 August 2026 ‡ National team caps and goals as of 18 November 2023

Matthew Foord (born 19 February 2006) is a New Zealand professional footballer who plays as a goalkeeper for New Zealand National League club Auckland City. He has represented New Zealand at under-17 level.

== Club career ==
=== Cashmere Technical ===
Foord went through the youth set-up at Christchurch United, before Cashmere Technical. He made 16 appearances for the club, including a 2–1 victory over his future side Wellington Phoenix Reserves.

=== Wellington Phoenix ===
Foord joined Wellington Phoenix FC Reserves in 2024, making just one senior appearance in 2 years.

=== Bula ===
Foord signed with Bula FC, a newly created club based in Fiji, for the inaugural season of the OFC Professional League, signing as one of the club's overseas-based signings. He made four appearances in the first season, including a stand-out performance against New Zealand-based side South Island United.

=== Auckland City ===
On 19 June 2026, Foord signed with Auckland City for the remainder of the 2026 season.

== International career ==
Foord represented New Zealand at under-17 at the 2023 OFC U-17 Championship, playing 4 matches as New Zealand won the tournament. He also was part of the squad at the 2023 FIFA U-17 World Cup, playing 3 matches.

== Career statistics ==
=== Club ===
As of match played on 1 August 2026.

Appearances and goals by club, season and competition
Club	Season	League			Cup		Continental		Other		Total	
Club	Season	Division	Apps	Goals	Apps	Goals	Apps	Goals	Apps	Goals	Apps	Goals
Cashmere Technical	2022	National League	2	0	0	0	—		1 (Note: Appearance(s) in English Cup)	0	3	0
Cashmere Technical	2023	National League	14	0	0	0	—		3	0	17	0
Cashmere Technical	Total		16	0	0	0	0	0	4	0	20	0
Wellington Phoenix Reserves	2024	National League	0	0	0	0	—		—		0	0
Wellington Phoenix Reserves	2024	National League	7	0	0	0	—		—		7	0
Wellington Phoenix Reserves	Total		7	0	0	0	0	0	0	0	7	0
Bula FC	2026	—			—		4 (Note: Bula FC solely compete in OFC Professional League)	0	—		4	0
Auckland City	2026	National League	8	0	2	0	0	0	—		10	0
Career total			35	0	2	0	0	0	4	0	41	0

== Honours ==
Cashmere Technical

- English Cup: 2022
