= Nathan Rostron =

New Zealand footballer (born 2004)

Personal information
- Date of birth: 8 June 2004 (age 22)
- Place of birth: Tauranga, New Zealand
- Height: 1.90 m (6 ft 3 in)
- Position: Center back

Team information
- Current team: Auckland City
- Number: 5

Youth career
- –2021: Tauranga City

Senior career*
| Years | Team | Apps | (Gls) |
| 2021–2025 | Tauranga City | 22+ | (3+) |
| 2025–2026 | Birkenhead United | 29 | (1) |
| 2026– | Auckland City | 29 | (6) |
- * Club domestic league appearances and goals as of 21 November 2026

Nathan Rostron (born 8 June 2004) is a New Zealand semi-professional footballer who plays as a centre back for Auckland City.

== Career ==
=== Tauranga City ===
Rostron played for Tauranga City in the NRFL Championship from 2021 to 2023 before the club achieved promotion to the Northern League. He then made 22 league appearances and scored 3 goals before joining Birkenhead United.

=== Auckland City ===
On 17 March 2026, Rostron signed for Auckland City. He scored his first goal for the club on 11 April 2026 in the 21st minute of an eventual 4–2 win against Manukau United.
