= Jerson Lagos =

New Zealand football player

Personal information
- Full name: Jerson Esteban Lagos Giraldo
- Date of birth: 1 November 2002 (age 24)
- Place of birth: Bogotá, Colombia
- Height: 1.77 m (5 ft 10 in)
- Position: Forward

Team information
- Current team: Queensland Lions
- Number: 17

Youth career
- Falcon FC
- –2020: Melville United

Senior career*
Years	Team	Apps	(Gls)
2020–2023	Melville United	54	(7)
2024	Manurewa	12	(6)
2024–2025	Auckland City	27	(1)
2026–	Queensland Lions	0	(0)
- * Club domestic league appearances and goals as of 26 July 2025 2025

Jerson Esteban Lagos Giraldo (born 1 November 2002) is a semi-professional association football player from Colombia who plays as a forward for Queensland Lions.

== Club career ==
=== Early career ===
Growing up in Ecuador, Lagos played youth football for Falcon FC before moving to New Zealand. While living in Hamilton he played for Melville United youth sides before debuting for the first team.

=== Manurewa ===
Lagos joined Manurewa at the start of the 2024 season from Melville United.

=== Auckland City ===
On 30 June 2024 Lagos joined Auckland City for the remainder of the 2024 season. He made his debut against East Coast Bays on 12 July 2024. Lagos was picked for the 2024 FIFA Intercontinental Cup squad, where he scored in the first-round game against Al-Ain, directly from a corner. In 2025, Lagos was named in the 2025 FIFA Club World Cup squad, making appearances in the first two group games.

== Personal life ==
Born in Colombia, Lagos left to Ecuador at the age of three with his mother and three siblings, before fleeing to New Zealand as a refugee around the age of 8. Lagos also holds New Zealand citizenship. Previously working as a diesel-mechanic, Lagos now works as a part-time barber and is studying to gain his qualifications. Lagos has two sons.

== Career statistics ==
=== Club ===
Club	Season	League			National Cup		Continental		Other		Total	
Club	Season	Division	Apps	Goals	Apps	Goals	Apps	Goals	Apps	Goals	Apps	Goals
Melville United	2021	National League	12	0	3	1	—		—		15	1
Melville United	2022	National League	30	4	1	1	—		—		31	5
Melville United	2023	National League	10	3	4	2	—		—		14	5
Melville United	Total		52	7	8	4	0	0	0	0	60	11
Manurewa	2024	National League	12	6	2	0	—		—		14	6
Auckland City	2024	National League	18	1	0	0	—		1 (Note: Appearance in FIFA Intercontinental Cup)	1	19	2
Auckland City	2025	National League	19	1	1	2	5 (Note: Appearance in OFC Champions League)	0	4 (Note: Three appearances in FIFA Club World Cup; one appearance in FIFA Intercontinental Cup)	0	29	3
Auckland City	Total		26	7	3	2	5	0	4	1	38	10
Queensland Lions	2026	NPL Queensland	0	0	0	0	—		—		0	0
Career total												

== Honours ==
Auckland City

- Northern League: 2024
- New Zealand National League: 2024, 2025
- OFC Champions League: 2025
