= Angus Kilkolly =

New Zealand footballer (born 1995/6)

Personal information
- Full name: Angus John Dennison Kilkolly
- Date of birth: 18 April 1996 (age 30)
- Place of birth: Hastings, New Zealand
- Height: 1.88 m (6 ft 2 in)
- Position: Striker

Team information
- Current team: Auckland City
- Number: 9

Senior career*
Years	Team	Apps	(Gls)
2006–2007	Wanderers SC	10	(1)
2012–2014	Hawke's Bay United	5	(0)
2015–2016	Canterbury United	14	(5)
2016–2017	Hawke's Bay United	17	(5)
2017–2019	Team Wellington	38	(12)
2019–2020	Hawke's Bay United	7	(2)
2020–2021	Waitakere United	7	(1)
2022–	Auckland City	117	(59)
- * Club domestic league appearances and goals as of 9 May 2026

Angus John Dennison Kilkolly (born 18 April 1996) is a New Zealand footballer who plays as a striker for National League club Auckland City.

== Early life and education ==
Kilkolly was born in 1996 in New Zealand. He is a native of Hastings, New Zealand, and attended Hastings Boys' High School and subsequently Wellington College. Kilkolly works as a project manager for a painting company.

== Career ==
At the age of 19, Kilkolly spent time playing in Lithuania.

Kilkolly started his New Zealand career with Hawke's Bay United. In 2021, he signed for Auckland City.

== Personal life ==
Kilkolly has worked as a painting labourer. As of June 2025, he was a sales team leader for a power tool company.

== Career statistics ==
As of match played 9 May 2026

Club	Season	League			Chatham Cup		Continental		Other		Total	
Club	Season	Division	Apps	Goals	Apps	Goals	Apps	Goals	Apps	Goals	Apps	Goals
Hawke's Bay United	2012–13	Premiership	5	0	—		—		0	0	5	0
Hawke's Bay United	2013–14	Premiership	0	0	—		—		—		0	0
Hawke's Bay United	Total		5	0	0	0	0	0	0	0	5	0
Wanderers SC	2014–15	Premiership	10	1	—		—		—		10	1
Canterbury United Dragons	2015–16	Premiership	13	5	—		—		1 (Note: Appearances in New Zealand Football Championship play-offs)	0	14	5
Hawke's Bay United	2016–17	Premiership	16	5	—		—		1	0	17	5
Team Wellington	2017–18	Premiership	16	5	—		8 (Note: Appearance in OFC Champions League)	8	2	0	26	13
Team Wellington	2018–19	Premiership	16	5	—		4	1	3 (Note: Two appearances; one goal in New Zealand Football Championship play-offs; one appearance in FIFA Club World Cup)	1	23	7
Team Wellington	2019–20	Premiership	2	1	—		—		—		2	1
Team Wellington	Total		34	11	0	0	12	9	5	1	51	20
Hawke's Bay United	2019–20	Premiership	7	2	—		—		—		7	2
Waitakere United	2020–21	Premiership	7	1	—		—		—		7	1
Auckland City	2021	National League	17	18	3	2	—		—		20	20
Auckland City	2022	National League	27	13	2	0	0	0	1 (Note: Appearance in FIFA Club World Cup)	0	30	13
Auckland City	2023	National League	29	14	3	1	6	3	1	0	39	18
Auckland City	2024	National League	26	9	6	9	5	0	1 (Note: Appearance in FIFA Intercontinental Cup)	0	38	18
Auckland City	2025	National League	12	2	0	0	0	0	1	0	13	2
Auckland City	2026	National League	6	3	0	0	0	0	0	0	6	3
Auckland City	Total		117	59	14	12	11	3	4	0	146	74
Career total			209	84	14	12	23	12	11	1	257	108
