= Christian Gray (footballer) =

New Zealand footballer (born 1996)

Personal information
- Full name: Christian Thomas Gray
- Date of birth: 29 November 1996 (age 29)
- Place of birth: Gisborne, New Zealand
- Height: 1.88 m (6 ft 2 in)
- Position: Centre-back

Team information
- Current team: Auckland City

Youth career
- Wellington College

Senior career*
Years	Team	Apps	(Gls)
2016–2018	Waitakere United	8	(0)
2020–2021	Eastern Suburbs	43	(2)
2022–2026	Auckland City	69	(6)
2026	South Island United	16 (Note: South Island United compete solely in the OFC Professional League)	(1)
2026–	Auckland City	0	(0)
- * Club domestic league appearances and goals as of 21 May 2026

Christian Thomas Gray (born 29 November 1996) is a New Zealand footballer who plays as a centre-back for National League club Auckland City FC.

== Career ==
Gray is the son of former international footballer Rodger Gray and international netball player Sandra Edge. He began playing association football at Wellington College in 2013. As a senior player, Gray started his career at Waitakere United in 2016. He has also played for Eastern Suburbs AFC and, since 2022, for Auckland City.

In June 2025, Gray was named in Auckland City's squad for the 2025 FIFA Club World Cup, the club's tenth appearance in the tournament. On 24 June, he scored the equaliser against Boca Juniors becoming the player of the match. This is their first non-defeated result since the 2014 edition.

On 7 January 2026, South Island United of the OFC Professional League announced the signing of Gray. On 15 January, Gray was announced as the inaugural captain for the 2026 season.

On 16 June, it was announced that Gray had returned to Auckland City.

== Personal life ==
A semi-professional footballer, Gray also works as a PE teacher at Auckland Grammar School and Mt Roskill Intermediate School.

== Career statistics ==
Appearances and goals by club, season and competition
Club	Season	League			National cup		Continental		Other		Total	
Club	Season	Division	Apps	Goals	Apps	Goals	Apps	Goals	Apps	Goals	Apps	Goals
Waitakere United	2015–16	Premiership	3	0	—		—		—		3	0
Waitakere United	2017–18	Premiership	5	0	—		—		—		5	0
Waitakere United	Total		8	0	0	0	0	0	0	0	8	0
Eastern Suburbs	2019–20	Premiership	14	2	—		3 (Note: Appearance in OFC Champions League)	0	—		17	2
Eastern Suburbs	2020–21	Premiership	14	0	—		—		1 (Note: Appearances in New Zealand Football Championship play-offs)	0	15	0
Eastern Suburbs	2021	National League	14	0	2	0	—		—		14	0
Eastern Suburbs	Total		42	2	2	0	3	0	1	0	48	2
Auckland City	2022	National League	6	0	2	0	1	0	1 (Note: Appearance in FIFA Club World Cup)	0	8	0
Auckland City	2023	National League	24	1	2	1	1	1	1	0	26	2
Auckland City	2024	National League	15	1	5	1	6	1	0	0	26	3
Auckland City	2025	National League	29	5	0	0	2	0	3 (Note: Two appearances, one goal in FIFA Club World Cup; one appearance in FIFA Intercontinental Cup)	1	34	6
Auckland City	Total		74	7	9	2	10	2	5	1	94	11
South Island United	2026	—			—		16	1	—		16	1
Auckland City	2026	National League	0	0	0	0	0	0	—		0	0
Career total			140	10	11	2	13	2	6	1	170	15

== Honours ==
Auckland City

- OFC Champions League: 2022, 2023, 2024, 2025
- New Zealand National League: 2022, 2024, 2025

Birkenhead United

- Chatham Cup: 2018

Individual

- New Zealand National League Team of the Season: 2025
