= Ivan Vuksich =

New Zealand association football administrator

Ivan Vuksich (born 1948) is a New Zealand association football administrator. He was formerly the president of Central United Football Club (1995–2021) and is currently the chairperson of Auckland City Football Club (2004–present).

== Early life ==
Vuksich spent his childhood in Auckland and was educated at St Peter's College (1959–1965) where he played rugby union and cricket.

== Football administration career ==
Central United was formed in 1962 and Auckland City was formed in 2004 after New Zealand Football introduced the new franchise-based ASB Premiership. Under Vuksich's reign Central United has won the national league twice, in 1999 & 2001 and the Chatham Cup five times, in 1997, 1998, 2005, 2007 & 2012. Vuksich has overseen Auckland City claim the ASB Premiership in five of the past ten years - 2004/05, 2005/06, 2006/07, 2008/09 & 2013/14. The club also claimed the Oceania Champions League in 2006, 2009, 2011, 2012, 2013 & 2014. They represented the Oceania Confederation at the FIFA Club World Cup in Japan in 2006 and in Abu Dhabi in 2009. The club followed their 6th placing in 2006 by winning two of their three matches at the tournament in 2009, including a 3-2 victory over TP Mazembe (Democratic Republic of the Congo), the champions of the African Confederation, in the 5th place play-off match. No New Zealand side had previously won a match at this tournament and the side's final placing equalled that of Sydney FC (Australia) in 2005 as Oceania's best result at the FIFA Club World Cup. The club returned to Japan again for this tournament as Oceania's representative in 2011 and 2012 where they faced the Japanese Champions Kashiwa Reysol and Sanfrecce Hiroshima respectively in the opening play-off match. The side produced brave performances before going down 0-2 and 0-1 claiming 7th place on each occasion. In 2013 the tournament was held in Morocco with Auckland City putting up a valiant performance against local champions Raja Casablanca, losing 1-2 to an injury time winning goal.

Vuksich's seven National League titles, five Chatham Cup victories and six Oceania club championships is believed to be a record haul for a chairman in NZ football.

Vuksich was appointed a member of FIFA's "World Club Taskforce" in 2006 & 2007. This was a 12-person committee established to help to resolve common problems encountered by clubs throughout the world. In February 2012 Vuksich was appointed to FIFA's "Working Group for the International Match Calendar" committee. This 28-person working group has assisted in setting FIFA's international match calendar for the 2015-2022 period.

On Tuesday 1 May 2012 Vuksich was made a Life Member of New Zealand Football at the sport's Annual Congress. He is only the 15th individual in the national body's 121-year history to receive this prestigious honour which is bestowed upon those who have made an outstanding contribution to the game in New Zealand.
