= Ryan De Vries =

New Zealand footballer

Personal information
- Full name: Ryan Keith De Vries
- Date of birth: 14 September 1991 (age 35)
- Place of birth: Cape Town, South Africa
- Height: 1.82 m (6 ft 0 in)
- Position: Forward

Team information
- Current team: Auckland City
- Number: 11

Senior career*
Years	Team	Apps	(Gls)
2010–2013	Waitakere United	51	(25)
2013–2018	Auckland City	70	(36)
2014	→ Bentleigh Greens (loan)	9	(2)
2015	→ Bentleigh Greens (loan)	12	(2)
2018–2019	FC Gifu	53	(8)
2020–2021	Sligo Rovers	40	(6)
2022–	Auckland City	87	(34)

International career
2015	New Zealand	1	(0)
- * Club domestic league appearances and goals as of 11 April 2026

Ryan Keith De Vries (born 14 September 1991) is a professional footballer who plays as a forward for National League club Auckland City. Born in South Africa, he represents the New Zealand national team.

== Club career ==
Born in Cape Town, South Africa, De Vries made his debut for Waitakere United in the 2009–10 New Zealand Football Championship and transferred to Auckland City in 2013. He won the New Zealand Football Championship in each of his first six seasons.

On 18 May 2014, in the OFC Champions League Final second leg, De Vries equalised as Auckland came from behind to defeat Amicale of Vanuatu 2–1, 3–2 on aggregate. In December of that year, he helped his team become the first Oceanian side to come third at the FIFA Club World Cup, putting the team in front in an eventual 1–1 draw with Mexico's Cruz Azul before a penalty shootout victory.

On 17 January 2018, De Vries signed a one-year deal to play for FC Gifu in Japan.

On 25 February 2020, De Vries signed for League of Ireland Premier Division side Sligo Rovers.

De Vries scored three goals during his debut season in Ireland helping Sligo Rovers secure a top four finish. In December 2020 he signed a new contract for the 2021 season.

In 2022 De Vries returned to New Zealand Football with Auckland City making his comeback in a 4–0 friendly win over West Coast Rangers scoring two goals in the first half.

== International career ==
New Zealand Football initially approached FIFA in 2011 to establish whether De Vries was eligible to play for New Zealand, which he was not at the time. On 8 March 2015, he was called into the New Zealand national football team to play a friendly against South Korea by coach Anthony Hudson. He made his debut in the match in Seoul on 31 March, being substituted at half time for Tyler Boyd in a 0–1 defeat.

== Career statistics ==
As of match played on 11 April 2026

Club	Season	League			Cup (Note: Includes Chatham Cup, FFA Cup, Emperor's Cup, FAI Cup)		League Cup (Note: Includes White Ribbon Cup, Dockerty Cup & J.League Cup)		Continental		Other		Total	
Club	Season	Division	Apps	Goals	Apps	Goals	Apps	Goals	Apps	Goals	Apps	Goals	Apps	Goals
Waitakere United	2009–10	Premiership	8	1	–		–		5 (Note: Appearances in OFC Champions League)	1	3 (Note: Appearances in New Zealand Football Championship Playoffs)	1	16	3
Waitakere United	2010–11	Premiership	11	6	–		–		5	1	3	2	19	9
Waitakere United	2011–12	Premiership	15	9	–		–		6	3	0 (Note: Appearance in Charity Cup)	0	21	12
Waitakere United	2012–13	Premiership	17	9	–		–		9	1	4 (Note: 1 appearance in Charity Cup & 3 appearances, 1 goal in New Zealand Football Championship Playoffs)	1	30	11
Waitakere United	Total		51	25	–		–		25	6	10	4	86	35
Auckland City	2013–14	Premiership	13	2	–		–		6	1	4 (Note: 1 appearance in Charity Cup & 3 appearances in New Zealand Football Championship Playoffs)	0	23	3
Auckland City	2014–15	Premiership	16	5	–		–		5	0	9 (Note: 4 appearances, 1 goal in FIFA Club World Cup & 3 appearances, 3 goals in OFC President's Cup & 2 appearances, 2 goals in New Zealand Football Championship Playoffs)	6	30	11
Auckland City	2015–16	Premiership	16	15	–		–		5	1	4 (Note: 1 appearance in FIFA Club World Cup & 2 appearances, 2 goals in New Zealand Football Championship Playoffs & 1 appearance in Charity Cup)	2	25	18
Auckland City	2016–17	Premiership	19	4	–		–		4	6	3 (Note: 1 appearance in FIFA Club World Cup & 2 appearances in New Zealand Football Championship Playoffs)	0	26	10
Auckland City	2017–18	Premiership	6	10	–		–		0	0	1 (Note: Appearances in FIFA Club World Cup)	0	7	10
Auckland City	Total		70	36	–		–		20	8	21	8	111	52
Bentleigh Greens (loan)	2014	NPL Victoria	9	2	2	1	0	0	–		–		11	3
Bentleigh Greens (loan)	2015	NPL Victoria	12	2	0	0	0	0	–		–		12	2
FC Gifu	2018	J2 League	26	4	1	0	0	0	–		–		27	4
FC Gifu	2019	J2 League	27	4	0	0	0	0	–		–		27	4
FC Gifu	Total		74	12	3	1	0	0	–		–		86	13
Sligo Rovers	2020	LOI Premier Division	14	3	3	0	–		–		–		17	3
Sligo Rovers	2021	LOI Premier Division	26	3	1	0	–		2 (Note: Appearances in UEFA Europa Conference League)	0	–		29	3
Sligo Rovers	Total		40	6	4	0	–		2	0	–		46	6
Auckland City	2022	National League	25	8	6	6	–		4	0	1	0	36	14
Auckland City	2023	National League	21	16	3	5	–		5	5	1	0	30	26
Auckland City	2024	National League	24	9	6	2	–		7	2	1 (Note: Appearances in FIFA Intercontinental Cup)	0	38	13
Auckland City	2025	National League	14	1	1	1	–		3	0	2	0	20	2
Auckland City	2026	National League	2	0	0	0	–		0	0	0	0	2	0
Auckland City	Total		77	30	16	14	–		19	7	5	0	117	51
Career Total			334	113	23	15	0	0	66	21	36	12	458	161

== Honours ==
Waitakere United

- New Zealand Football Championship: 2009–10, 2010–11, 2011–12, 2012–13
- Charity Cup: 2012

Auckland City

- NZ Football League: 2013-14, 2014-15, 2022, 2024, 2025
- Chatham Cup: 2022
- Charity Cup: 2013, 2015, 2016
- Premiers of NZFC: 2013–14, 2014–15, 2015–16, 2016–17, 2017–18
- Northern League: 2022, 2023, 2024
- OFC Champions League: 2013–14, 2014–15, 2016, 2017, 2022, 2023, 2024, 2025
- OFC President's Cup: 2014
