= Kiwitea Street =

Stadium in Auckland, New Zealand

Coordinates: 36.8978°S 174.7364°E

- also known as Freyberg Field
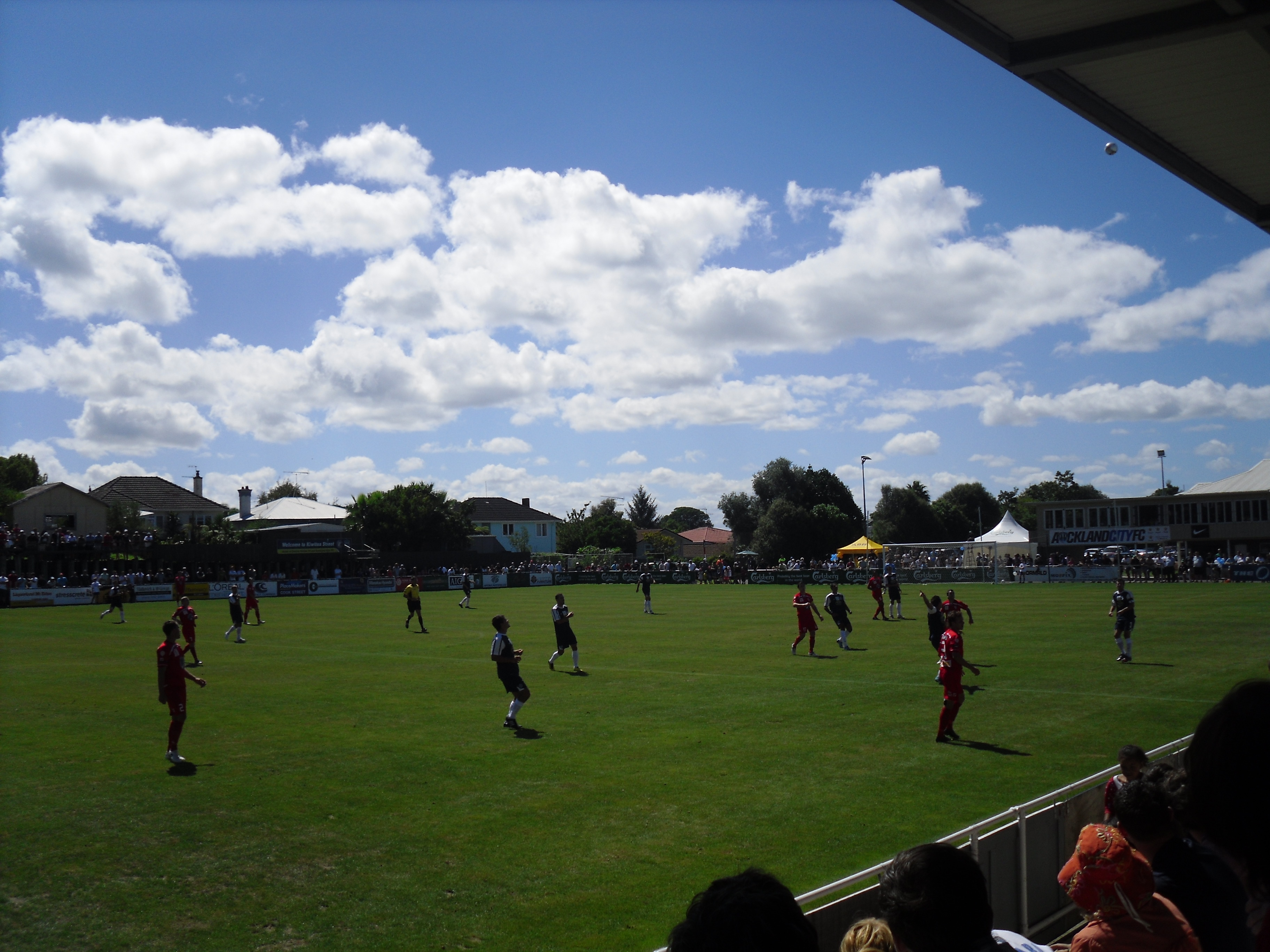
- Interactive map of Kiwitea Street
- Location: 47 Kiwitea Street, Auckland, New Zealand
- Owner: City of Auckland
- Operator: City of Auckland
- Capacity: 3,500
- Surface: Grass Pitch

Construction
- Opened: 1965

Tenants
- Auckland City FC (2004–present); Central United (1965–present)

Kiwitea Street, also known as Freyberg Field, is a multi-purpose stadium in the suburb of Sandringham in Auckland, New Zealand. It is used for Association football matches and is the home stadium of both Auckland City FC and Central United. Terraced seating can accommodate 250 patrons.

The stadium is named for Bernard Freyberg, 1st Baron Freyberg.

Kiwitea Street was the venue of the 2007 Chatham Cup final.

== History ==
Initially, the Central club played their home games at either the Auckland Domain or the Oakley Ground in Waterview. A move to a permanent home site came in 1965, when Freyberg Field, situated on the borders of the suburbs of Sandringham and Mount Albert in Kiwitea Street, was made available for use as a football pitch, in spite of it being just forty-five metres wide.

The next quarter of a century saw Central increase the width of the pitch on three occasions, each time at club members' personal expense. The last such exercise took place in the late 1980s. After buying up adjoining properties, a massive timber retaining wall was erected, and 5000 cubic metres of earth was removed.

However, only six first-team games could be played at Kiwitea Street in 1992, due to its poor condition.

Following consultations with the Auckland City Council and the New Zealand Turf Culture Institute, a plan was implemented to develop an all-weather, sand carpeted pitch at Central – similar to those at Eden Park and the MCG – over a three-year period. The final result saw Kiwitea Street with a new football-playing surface by 1995.

In addition to these extensive works the club has also undertaken further major developments at the ground including:

1. The construction of a covered grandstand in 2004;
2. Additions to the clubrooms to incorporate a new boardroom, administration office, corporate hospitality wing and dedicated medical and physiotherapy room (2004–2007);
3. Further sand-slitting, sand-carpeting, and a full resurfacing of the pitch in 2007.

== Stands ==
- "David Vlatkovich Stand" - East stand, named after former Central United player and club member.
