= Joseph Lee (footballer) =

New Zealand footballer (born 2002)

Personal information
- Full name: Joseph Lee
- Date of birth: 12 July 2002 (age 24)
- Place of birth: New Zealand
- Height: 1.79 m (5 ft 10 in)
- Position: Forward

Team information
- Current team: Heidelberg United
- Number: 19

Youth career
- East Coast Bays
- –2020: Wellington Phoenix

Senior career*
Years	Team	Apps	(Gls)
2018	Wellington United	2	(0)
2019–2020	Wellington Phoenix Reserves	3	(0)
2019–2020	→ Lower Hutt City (loan)	18	(4)
2021	North Shore United	19	(10)
2022–2025	Auckland City	89	(18)
2026–	Heidelberg United	10	(0)

International career^{‡}
2018	New Zealand U17	4	(1)
2023	New Zealand U23	5	(0)
- * Club domestic league appearances and goals as of 24 April 2026 ‡ National team caps and goals as of 9 September 2023

Joseph Lee (born 12 July 2002) is a New Zealand footballer, who plays as a forward for Heidelberg United.

== Club career ==
=== Early career ===
Lee played youth football for East Coast Bays and the Wellington Phoenix Academy, before returning to Auckland and joining North Shore United.

=== Auckland City ===
In February 2022, Lee signed for Auckland City for the 2022 Northern League. In June 2025, Lee was named in Auckland City's squad for the 2025 FIFA Club World Cup, the club's tenth appearance in the tournament. He played the final group game, a 1–1 draw against Boca Juniors. This was their first non-defeated result since the 2014 edition.

=== Heidelberg United ===
On 31 January 2026, Heidelberg United announced the signing of Lee for the 2026 season.

== International career ==
On 3 September 2018, Lee was selected for the New Zealand U17's for the 2018 OFC U-16 Championship. Lee made his debut in the opening group game against Vanuatu, scoring the final goal in an 8–0 win. Lee played four games including the final as New Zealand went on to win the title. On 2 March 2023, Lee was called up to the New Zealand U23 squad for a two-game friendly series against China. He made his debut in the opening game. Lee was called up again on 16 August 2023, for the 2023 OFC Men's Olympic Qualifying Tournament. He played in all three of New Zealand's games as they qualified for the 2024 Olympics.

== Personal life ==
Lee is of Korean descent. A semi-professional footballer, Lee has also worked for Samsung in their customer service department.

== Career statistics ==
=== Club ===
As of match played 28 April 2026

Appearances and goals by club, season and competition
Club	Season	League			Cup		Continental		Other		Total	
Club	Season	Division	Apps	Goals	Apps	Goals	Apps	Goals	Apps	Goals	Apps	Goals
Wellington United	2018	Central League	2	0	0	0	—		—		2	0
Wellington Phoenix Reserves	2019–20	Premiership	3	0	—		—		—		3	0
Lower Hutt City (loan)	2019	Central League	5	0	0	0	—		—		5	0
Lower Hutt City (loan)	2020	Central League	13	4	—		—		—		13	4
Lower Hutt City (loan)	Total		18	4	0	0	0	0	0	0	18	4
North Shore United	2021	National League	19	10	3	1	—		—		22	11
Auckland City	2022	National League	29	7	5	2	5 (Note: Appearances in OFC Champions League)	1	—		39	10
Auckland City	2023	National League	24	7	3	1	6	0	2 (Note: One appearance in 2022 FIFA Club World Cup; one appearance in 2023 FIFA Club World Cup)	0	34	8
Auckland City	2024	National League	27	4	4	0	5	0	1 (Note: Appearance in FIFA Intercontinental Cup)	0	37	4
Auckland City	2025	National League	13	0	1	0	0	0	1 (Note: Appearance in FIFA Club World Cup)	0	15	0
Auckland City	Total		93	18	13	3	16	1	4	0	125	22
Heidelberg United	2026	NPL Victoria	10	0	2	1	—		—		12	1
Career total			141	32	18	5	16	1	4	0	178	38

== Honours ==
Auckland City

- Northern League: 2022, 2023, 2024
- Chatham Cup: 2022
- New Zealand National League: 2022, 2024, 2025
- OFC Champions League: 2022, 2023, 2024, 2025
