= Michael den Heijer =

New Zealand footballer (born 1996)

Personal information
- Full name: Michael James den Heijer
- Date of birth: 14 April 1996 (age 30)
- Place of birth: Auckland, New Zealand
- Height: 1.83 m (6 ft 0 in)
- Position: Center back

Team information
- Current team: Auckland FC (OFC)
- Number: 5

Youth career
- 2014: Kashiwa Reysol

Senior career*
Years	Team	Apps	(Gls)
2013–2014	Wanderers SC	13	(0)
2015–2016	Auckland City	16	(0)
2016–2019	NEC	0	(0)
2019–2020	DFS		
2020	1. FC Kleve	7	(2)
2022	Auckland United	29	(5)
2023–2025	Auckland City	9	(0)
2026–	Auckland FC (OFC)	13	(0)
- * Club domestic league appearances and goals as of 12 May 2026

Michael James den Heijer (born 14 April 1996) is a New Zealand footballer who plays as a defender for Auckland FC (OFC) in the OFC Pro League.

== Early life and education ==
Den Heijer started playing football at the age of five. He appeared in a commercial for New Zealand ice cream brand Tip Top at the age of seven.

Den Heijer attended Kashiwa Sports High School in Japan.

== Club career ==
In 2020, Den Heijer signed for German side 1. FC Kleve, where he was regarded as one of the club's most important players. After that, he signed for New Zealand side Auckland United, where he was regarded as one of the club's top players.

On 18 December 2025, Den Heijer joined Auckland FC to play in the newly founded OFC Professional League.

== International career ==
Den Heijer represented New Zealand internationally at the 2013 FIFA U-17 World Cup.

== Career statistics ==
Club	Season	League			National Cup		Continental		Other		Total	
Club	Season	Division	Apps	Goals	Apps	Goals	Apps	Goals	Apps	Goals	Apps	Goals

== Style of play ==
Den Heijer mainly operates as a midfielder and is known for his strength.

== Personal life ==
Den Heijer is of Dutch descent.

== Honours ==
Auckland City

- OFC Champions League: 2024, 2025
- National League: 2024, 2025

Auckland FC

- OFC Professional League: 2026
