= Zhou Tong (footballer) =

Chinese footballer (born 1990)

Zhou Tong 周通
Personal information
- Full name: Zhou Tong
- Date of birth: 12 January 1990 (age 36)
- Place of birth: Zibo, China
- Height: 1.69 m (5 ft 7 in)
- Position: Winger

Team information
- Current team: Auckland City
- Number: 22

Youth career
- 2002–2005: Beijing Guoan
- 2006–2007: Hebei Youth

Senior career*
Years	Team	Apps	(Gls)
2008	Shijiazhuang Tiangong	16	(0)
2010–2015	Dalian Aerbin	111	(10)
2015–2017	Tianjin Teda	23	(0)
2018–2020	Wuhan Zall	61	(0)
2021–2022	Tianjin Jinmen Tiger	30	(3)
2023–	Auckland City	54	(5)
- * Club domestic league appearances and goals as of 18 April 2026

Zhou Tong (Chinese: 周通; born 12 January 1990) is a Chinese professional footballer who plays as a winger for National League club Auckland City.

== Club career ==
Zhou started his senior career with China League Two side Shijiazhuang Tiangong in 2008. He moved to another League Two club Dalian Aerbin in 2009. He became the key player of the club, helping Dalian Aerbin win two successive championships as the team won promotion into Chinese Super League. He scored his first CSL goal on 24 March 2012, in a 3–3 away draw against Shandong Luneng Taishan. Zhou's Dalian career ended in acrimony when, in a crucial relegation battle against Tianjin Teda, Zhou removed his shirt in celebration of scoring the opening goal, notwithstanding a booking he had received earlier in the game. Dalian went on to lose the game 1–2 and were subsequently relegated at the end of the season. The following season, Zhou was not registered in the first team.

On 11 July 2015, Zhou transferred to Chinese Super League side Tianjin Teda. He made his debut on 12 August 2015 in a 1–1 away draw against Shijiazhuang Ever Bright, coming on for Yuan Weiwei in the 61st minute.

On 2 February 2018, Zhou transferred to China League One side Wuhan Zall. He would be an integral member of the squad and help gain promotion to the top tier for the club by winning the 2018 China League One division.

On 6 March 2023, Zhou joined Auckland City in the New Zealand Football Championship.

== Career statistics ==
Statistics accurate as of match played 31 December 2020.

Appearances and goals by club, season and competition
Club	Season	League			National Cup		Continental		Other		Total	
Club	Season	Division	Apps	Goals	Apps	Goals	Apps	Goals	Apps	Goals	Apps	Goals
Shijiazhuang Tiangong	2008	China League Two	16	0	-		-		-		16	0
Dalian Aerbin	2010	China League Two	18	2	-		-		-		18	2
Dalian Aerbin	2011	China League One	24	1	0	0	-		-		24	1
Dalian Aerbin	2012	Chinese Super League	25	4	2	1	-		-		27	5
Dalian Aerbin	2013	Chinese Super League	20	0	3	0	-		-		23	0
Dalian Aerbin	2014	Chinese Super League	24	3	0	0	-		-		24	3
Dalian Aerbin	2015	China League One	0	0	0	0	-		-		0	0
Dalian Aerbin	Total		111	10	5	1	0	0	0	0	116	11
Tianjin Teda	2015	Chinese Super League	7	0	0	0	-		-		7	0
Tianjin Teda	2016	Chinese Super League	16	0	2	0	-		-		18	0
Tianjin Teda	2017	Chinese Super League	0	0	1	0	-		-		1	0
Tianjin Teda	Total		23	0	3	0	0	0	0	0	26	0
Wuhan Zall	2018	China League One	27	0	2	0	-		-		29	0
Wuhan Zall	2019	Chinese Super League	20	0	0	0	-		-		20	0
Wuhan Zall	2020	Chinese Super League	14	0	4	0	-		2 (Note: Appearance(s) in CSL Relegation play-offs)	0	20	0
Wuhan Zall	Total		61	0	6	0	0	0	2	0	69	0
Career total			211	10	14	1	0	0	2	0	227	11

== Honours ==
Dalian Aerbin

- China League Two: 2010
- China League One: 2011

Wuhan Zall

- China League One: 2018

Auckland City

- OFC Champions League: 2024, 2025
- National League: 2024, 2025
