= Regont Murati =

Kosovan footballer (born 1996)

Personal information
- Full name: Regont Murati
- Date of birth: 14 May 1996 (age 30)
- Place of birth: Peja, Kosovo
- Height: 1.83 m (6 ft 0 in)
- Position: Defender

Team information
- Current team: Auckland City
- Number: 12

Youth career
- 2013–2014: Auckland City
- 2015–2016: Auckland City

Senior career*
Years	Team	Apps	(Gls)
2014–2015	Wanderers SC	14	(2)
2016	Auckland City	0	(0)
2016–2017	Hamilton Wanderers	5	(0)
2017	Central United		
2017–2018	Eastern Suburbs	3	(0)
2018–2019	Central United		
2019–2021	Waitakere United	22	(1)
2021–2022	Auckland United	50	(6)
2023–	Auckland City	80	(9)
- * Club domestic league appearances and goals as of 21 November 2026

Regont Murati (born 14 May 1996) is a Kosovan-born semi-professional footballer who plays as a defender for National League club Auckland City.

== Career ==
=== Early career ===
After stints with Wanderers SC, Hamilton Wanderers and Central United, Murati signed for Waitakere United in 2019.

=== Auckland United ===
On 1 March 2021, Murati signed for Auckland United.

=== Auckland City ===
On 14 January 2023, Murati signed for Auckland City.

In June 2025, Murati was named in Auckland City's squad for the 2025 FIFA Club World Cup, the club's tenth appearance in the tournament. He played two games, including the final group game, a 1–1 draw against Boca Juniors. This was their first non-defeated result since the 2014 edition.

== Honours ==
Auckland City

- Northern League: 2023, 2024
- New Zealand National League: 2024, 2025
- OFC Champions League: 2023, 2024
