= Conor Tracey =

New Zealand association football player (born 1997)

Personal information
- Full name: Conor Joseph Tracey
- Date of birth: 13 April 1997 (age 29)
- Height: 1.88 m (6 ft 2 in)
- Position: Goalkeeper

Team information
- Current team: Auckland City
- Number: 1

Youth career
- Papakura City
- –2013: Beachlands Maraetai
- –2016: Auckland City

Senior career*
| Years | Team | Apps | (Gls) |
| 2011–2013 | Beachlands Maraetai | | |
| 2014 | Ellerslie | | |
| 2014–2015 | Queens Park Rangers | 0 | (0) |
| 2015–2016 | Auckland City | 0 | (0) |
| 2016–2017 | Three Kings United | | |
| 2017–2018 | Auckland City | 0 | (0) |
| 2018 | Ellerslie AFC | | (0) |
| 2018–2019 | Canterbury United | 18 | (0) |
| 2019–2026 | Auckland City | 91 | (0) |

International career
| 2017 | New Zealand U20 | 0 | (0) |
| 2019 | New Zealand U23 | 4 | (0) |
- * Club domestic league appearances and goals as of 19 July 2025

Conor Joseph Tracey (born 13 April 1997) is a New Zealand semi-professional association football player who plays as a goalkeeper.

== Club career ==
=== Early career ===
Tracey as a young man played for local clubs in Auckland like Papakura City and Beachlands Maraetai alongside English club Queens Park Rangers.

At the age of 15, Tracey became an integral part of the Beachlands Maraetai squad during the 2012–13 season.

=== Canterbury United ===
Tracey played in the youth of Canterbury United before signing a contract with them in 2017, however he would only play for them for one season as he would leave for Auckland City in the same year.

=== Auckland City ===
After leaving Canterbury United, Tracey joined Auckland City, where he has become a regular starter. He has played in four international FIFA tournaments, the 2017 FIFA Club World Cup, 2022 FIFA Club World Cup, 2023 FIFA Club World Cup, 2025 FIFA Club World Cup.

== International career ==
Tracey was called up for the FIFA U-20 World Cup Korea Republic 2017 and he also helped the New Zealand U23 qualify for the 2024 Olympic Games.

== Personal life ==
Because football in New Zealand is semi-professional, football is his part-time job, his real job is at a veterinary pharmaceutical warehouse.

== Honours ==
Auckland City

- New Zealand Football Championship: 2019–20
- New Zealand National League: 2022, 2024
- Chatham Cup: 2022
- Northern League: 2021, 2022, 2023, 2024
- OFC Champions League: 2022, 2023, 2024, 2025

Individual

- New Zealand Football Championship Team of the Season: 2019–20
