= 2024 Chatham Cup =

Tournament details
- Country: New Zealand
- Dates: 25 April 2024 – 7 September 2024
- Teams: 128

Final positions
- Champions: Wellington Olympic
- Runners-up: Auckland City
- Semifinalists: Coastal Spirit; Birkenhead United

Tournament statistics
- Matches played: 126
- Goals scored: 614 (4.87 per match)
- Top goal scorer: Angus Kilkolly – Auckland City (9 goals)

Awards
- Jack Batty Cup: Stipe Ukich

The 2024 Chatham Cup was New Zealand's 96th annual knockout football competition.

It had a preliminary round and four rounds proper before quarter-finals, semi-finals, and a final.

== Results ==
=== Preliminary round ===
Matches were played over ANZAC weekend of 25–28 April. This round contained four teams from the Auckland Sunday football leagues — AFC Bohemian Celtic, Colo Boys, Sperm Whales FC, and University of Auckland FC — which were the lowest-ranked teams in the competition.

Number of teams per tier still in competition
Tier 1+2 (Note: All but one Southern League team joined in the first round. All Northern and Central League teams joined the competition in the second round along with the remaining Southern League team.)	Tier 3	Tier 4	Tier 5, 6, 8, 9	Sunday League	Total
32 / 32	37 / 37	25 / 25	30 / 30	4 / 4	128 / 128

Northern Region

25 April 2024	AFC Bohemian Celtic (SUN)	2–1	West Hamilton United (5)	Ellerslie
14:00	O'Loughlin 2', 19'; Edwards (yellow card) 48'	Report	Reed 72'	Stadium: Michaels Ave Reserve; Referee: Derek Anderson

25 April 2024	Northern United (5)	2–1	Uni-Mount Bohemian (5)	Rototuna North
14:00	Kennedy 4'; Christian 46'; Brown (yellow card) 47'	Report	Hamill 63'; Kumar (yellow card) 84'; Naidu (yellow card) 86'	Stadium: Korikori Park; Referee: Phillip Rogers

25 April 2024	Pukekohe (9)	1–2	Matamata Swifts (5)	Pukekohe
14:00	Seabrook 33'; Hewitt-Swaine (yellow card) 66'; Naidu (yellow card) 74'	Report	Shannon 21'; J. Harris (yellow card) 29'; Griffiths (yellow card) 36'; Bibby 45'; A. Harris (yellow card) 66'	Stadium: Bledisloe Park; Referee: Binesh Chand

25 April 2024	Otorohanga (5)	4–0	Colo Boys (SUN)	Ōtorohanga
14:00	Walker 29', 54'; Ball 36'; Apperley 55'	Report	Barker (yellow card) 10' (yellow-red card) 90+1'; Windle (yellow card) 37'; Lindsay (yellow card) 64'; Goncalves (yellow card) 90+2'	Stadium: Otorohanga Domain; Referee: Carl Watkins

25 April 2024	Mangere United (5)	1–3	South Auckland Rangers (5)	Māngere East
16:00	Singh (yellow card) 26' (goal) 52'; Kimar (yellow card) 50'; Ismaeil (yellow card) 62'	Report	Harford 42', 83'; Maukau (yellow card) 62'; Breadmore 80'	Stadium: Centre Park; Referee: David Pal

27 April 2024	Tikipunga (6)	1–10	Papatoetoe (5)	Tikipunga
14:00	Kitchen 15'; Campbell (yellow card) 48'	Report	Ernst 7'; Prasad 17', 23', 62', 88'; Groen 25', 81', 87'; Kumar 30' (pen.), 90'	Stadium: Tikipunga Park; Referee: Dan Owens

28 April 2024	Sperm Whales (SUN)	1–3	University of Auckland (SUN)	Royal Oak
14:00	East 9' (yellow card) 75'	Report	Spurr 60'; Andersen 83'; Masitakurima 90+1' (pen.)	Stadium: Seymour Park; Referee: Daniel King

Central Region

27 April 2024	New Plymouth Rangers (3)	1–3	Havelock North Wanderers (3)	Merrilands
12:45	Leggett 43'	Report	Reeves 54'; Speers 60'; Chapman 67'; Maney (yellow card) 72'	Stadium: Merrilands Domain; Referee: Ian Robinson

27 April 2024	Whanganui Athletic (3)	0–2	Palmerston North United (3)	Whanganui East
14:00	Dejohn (yellow card) 75'	Report	Cudby (yellow card) 41'; Cooksley 51'; Mori 80'	Stadium: Wembley Park; Referee: Edward Cook

Capital Region

25 April 2024	Upper Hutt City (3)	7–0	Lower Hutt City (3)	Upper Hutt
14:00	M. Warbrick 20' (yellow card) 61'; Wenster 22', 28'; Porter-Wallis 36'; Bentley (yellow card) 40'; Marshall (yellow card) 58'; Adams 80'; D. Warbrick 80'; Fong 90+1'	Report	Raynor (yellow card) 15'; McGarry (yellow card) 66'	Stadium: Maidstone Park; Referee: Ali Muhammad

25 April 2024	Paekākāriki (8)	1–0	Wainuiomata (3)	Paekākāriki
14:00	Thorpe 65'; Frost (yellow card) 81'	Report		Stadium: Campbell Park; Referee: Graham Strang

25 April 2024	Greytown (5)	3–2	Naenae (6)	Greytown
14:00	Palmer 8' (yellow card) 35'; MacDonald 45'; Traill 52'	Report	Cross 25', 90+1'; Bloomfield (yellow card) 81'	Stadium: Soldiers Memorial Park; Referee: Stephen Sale

25 April 2024	Victoria University (4)	2–1	Douglas Villa (4)	Kelburn
14:00	Gilbert 19'; Nicholson 22' (yellow card) 90'; Wilson (yellow card) 86'	Report	Cox (yellow card) 18'; McMenamin 35' (yellow card) 45+2'	Stadium: Boyd Wilson Turf; Referee: Matt Harrison

25 April 2024	Wellington Marist (4)	1–2	Seatoun (3)	Kilbirnie
14:00	Bennett 6' (o.g.); Greig 55'; Holloway (yellow card) 90'	Report	Geusebroek 45'; Sneddon (yellow card) 75'	Stadium: Kilbirnie Park; Referee: Chris Evans

25 April 2024	Te Kotahitanga (3)	3–3 (a.e.t.) (2–3 p)	Tawa (3)	Paraparaumu
14:00	de Vries 38'; Brown (yellow card) 49'; MacKay (yellow card) 55'; Jackson 90+5'	Report	Kerr (yellow card) 51'; Rose 71'; Zitye 90+4', 97'; McFadyen 99' (o.g.)	Stadium: Mazengarb Reserve; Referee: David Beattie

25 April 2024	Wellington United (6)	1–3	Brooklyn Northern United (4)	Newtown
14:00	Quin (yellow card) 29' (goal) 47'; Collie (yellow card) 45'; Strong (yellow card) 51' (yellow-red card) 74'	Report	Sperring (yellow card) 25'; Laffey (yellow card) 30'; Sowersby 45'; Kelly 45+3'; Weldeyohanes 45+4'; Crawford (yellow card) 48'; Curry (yellow card) 74'	Stadium: Newtown Park; Referee: Dan Shaw

25 April 2024	Stokes Valley (5)	8–0	Carterton (8)	Taitā
15:00	Close 21', 47'; Hinton 45'; Woods (yellow card) 55' (goal) 87'; Ross 60', 75', 80'; Thomas 85'	Report		Stadium: Fraser Park; Referee: Peter Linney

Nelson / Marlborough Bays Region

27 April 2024	Mapua Rangers (6)	0–2	Richmond Athletic (5)	Māpua
14:00		Report	Barnett 48' (pen.); Mold 71'	Stadium: Mapua Domain; Referee: Paul Jepson

27 April 2024	FC Nelson (5)	9–0	Motueka (5)	Nelson
14:45	Newson 3', 53'; Harris 23'; Hansen 45+1'; Rudy 60'; Wilson 61'; Khupchawn 76'; Viveros Enrriquez 88', 89'	Report	King (yellow card) 70' (red card) 71'	Stadium: Guppy Park; Referee: Maurice John Llewellin

Canterbury Region

27 April 2024	Western (3)	2–1	St Albans Shirley (6)	Mairehau
14:00	King 2'; Zimmerman 40'; Lund (yellow card) 90+1'	Report	Legge (yellow card) 69'; Simon 86'	Stadium: Walter Park; Referee: Iain Marshall

27 April 2024	Parklands United (3)	3–5 (a.e.t.)	Burwood (3)	Parklands
14:00	Gruschow 11'; Bailey 32'; Norris 90+8'	Report	Braithwaite 13'; Woolcott 45+3'; Austen 101'; Davies 115'; One Scorer Missing (Unknown)	Stadium: Parklands Reserve; Referee: Regan Preston

28 April 2024	Waimakariri United (3)	13–0	Oxford (5)	Kaiapoi
14:30	Loney 15', 27' (pen.), 40' (pen.), 45+4', 59', 84'; Paterson 18'; Ribeiro de Abreu 49', 72', 88'; Branso 57'; de Bono 67', 90'	Report	Cuevas (yellow card) 35'; Larrañaga (red card) 39'; Arratia (yellow card) 41'; Schell (yellow card) 68'	Stadium: Kendall Park; Referee: Alex Dahlberg

29 April 2024	High School Old Boys (8)	0–2	Halswell United (3)	Prebbleton
19:00		Report		Stadium: Kakaha Park; Referee: Michael Field

=== Round 1 ===
Matches were played over the of weekend of 10–13 May. This round contained two teams from the Auckland Sunday football leagues — AFC Bohemian Celtic, and University of Auckland FC — which were the lowest-ranked teams in the competition.

Number of teams per tier still in competition
Tier 1+2	Tier 3	Tier 4	Tier 5, 6, 8, 9	Sunday League	Total
32 / 32	31 / 37	23 / 25	17 / 30	2 / 4	105 / 128

Northern Region

10 May 2024	Metro (3)	4–1	Oratia United (4)	Mount Albert
19:30	Marowa (yellow card) 21'; Freeman 24', 90', 90+4'; Haj 35'; Hearn (yellow card) 83'	Report	Burrow (yellow card) 64'; Brown 80'	Stadium: Phyllis Street Reserve; Referee: Shawn Liu

11 May 2024	Te Awamutu (4)	1–2	Waikato Unicol (4)	Te Awamutu
14:00	Edger 90+5'	Report	Tsumura 10'; Sulieman 89'	Stadium: The Stadium; Referee: Brendon Coker

11 May 2024	Ngaruawahia United (3)	5–2	University of Auckland (SUN)	Ngāruawāhia
14:00	Boon 5', 19'; Perez 27'; McMillan (yellow card) 32'; Marden 58' (yellow card) 82'; McCracken (red card) 69'; Grant 84'	Report	Masiyakurima (yellow card) 37'; Williamson (yellow card) 79'; Crawford (yellow card) 86'; Two Scorer Missing (Unknown)	Stadium: Centennial Park; Referee: Andy Holdsworth

11 May 2024	Beachlands Maraetai (4)	2–1 (a.e.t.)	West Auckland (5)	Beachlands
14:00	Hamilton (yellow card) 69'; Thurbon (yellow card) 89'; Peters 89', 119'; Zeyni (yellow card) 101'	Report	Kim 27'	Stadium: Te Puru Park; Referee: Tanvir Bhamji

11 May 2024	Hibiscus Coast (3)	6–0	Waiuku (5)	Stanmore Bay
14:00	Mayers 13'; Stevenson 24'; Brown 50', 90'; Windelburn 64', 90+2'	Report	Thurbon (yellow card) 17'; Khan (yellow card) 64'	Stadium: Stanmore Bay Park; Referee: Ronald van Zuilen

11 May 2024	Papatoetoe (5)	1–2	Northern United (5)	Papatoetoe
14:00	Best 23' (o.g.)	Report	Brown 88' (yellow card) 89'; Sole 90+4'	Stadium: Murdoch Park; Referee: Nick Kang

11 May 2024	Claudelands Rovers (4)	2–4	Bucklands Beach (4)	Hamilton East
14:00	Shannon Forrester 45', 90+3'	Report	Jones 31'; Bohea 33', 38'; Allen (yellow card) 35'; Waterland 85'	Stadium: Galloway Park; Referee: Stuart Blake

11 May 2024	Waiheke United (4)	2–0	Te Atatu (4)	Waiheke Island
14:00	Lindner 16', 53'; Villasana (yellow card) 55'; Miranda (yellow card) 76'; Ciganda (yellow card) 82'	Report	Huntter (yellow card) 28'	Stadium: Onetangi Sports Complex; Referee: Alec Couchman

11 May 2024	Papakura City (5)	5–8 (a.e.t.)	Cambridge (4)	Papakura
14:00	Kumar 16'; Ashby-Peckham (yellow card) 30' (goal) 59'; Aracena Zuleta 57', 87' (yellow card) 90+2'; D. Clarkin 90+1' (o.g.); Krishna (yellow card) 90+2' (yellow-red card) 116'; Dixon (yellow card) 90+5'	Report	Connor 34', 105'; Webster 39', 65', 85', 101'; Mayo 53' (yellow card) 90+5'; Walters (yellow card) 81'; J. Clarkin 95'; Kelk (yellow card) 114'	Stadium: McLennan Park; Referee: Wilhelmus Duncker

11 May 2024	Taupo (4)	3–1	Franklin United (3)	Tauhara
14:00	Semple (yellow card) 16'; Zammit 28'; O'Donoghue 36', 72' (pen.); Green (yellow card) 52'; Christensen (yellow card) 81' (yellow-red card) 89'	Report	Dally-Braun 6' (yellow card) 31'; Singh (yellow card) 12'; Peters (yellow card) 60'; Taupau (yellow card) 89'	Stadium: Crown Park; Referee: Phillip Rogers

11 May 2024	Central United (5)	3–1	Northland (4)	Sandringham
14:00	Luque 9'; Ruffell 52' (pen.); Hiscotte (yellow card) 90+4'; Bader 90+5'	Report	Diamond (yellow card) 27'; Levell (yellow card) 41'; Romer (yellow card) 45'; Wi (yellow card) 65'; Paramore 90'	Stadium: Kiwitea Street; Referee: Danial Gallo

11 May 2024	Albany United (4)	2–4	South Auckland Rangers (5)	Rosedale
14:00	McGuiness 1'; Campodonico (red card) 7'; Chamberlain-Barlow (yellow card) 53'; One Missing Scorer (Unknown)	Report	Opperman 9' (pen.) (red card) 56'; Yackson Carabajal 13'; Harford 21' (pen.), 46'; Bulay (yellow card) After Match'	Stadium: Rosedale Park; Referee: Steven Francis

11 May 2024	Onehunga Mangere United (3)	6–0	Matamata Swifts (5)	Māngere East
14:00	Shipman 17', 22', 71' (pen.); Watkinson 26'; Price 29'; Vollerbregt 87'	Report	Clothier (yellow card) 39'; Rea (yellow card) 83'	Stadium: Centre Park; Referee: Samuel Clement

11 May 2024	Ngongotaha (4)	1–5	Manukau United (3)	Ngongotahā
14:00	Riley 34'	Report	Faheem 24'; Kumar (yellow card) 39'; Hale 41'; Shafahi 52'; Castro Pereyra 73'; Shah 87'	Stadium: Tamarahi Reserve; Referee: Mark Orchard

11 May 2024	North Shore United (3)	3–1	Takapuna (3)	Devonport
14:00	Lissington 24'; Petherick (yellow card) 37'; Wells 39'; Singh (yellow card) 44'; Garcia 61' (yellow card) 90'; Irrabarra Gonzalez (yellow card) 81'	Report	Friday (yellow card) 2'; Allport 7'; Cahill-Fahey (yellow card) 50'	Stadium: Allen Hill Stadium; Referee: Beth Rattray

11 May 2024	Otumoetai (4)	3–2	Te Puke United (5)	Matua
14:00	Boland 29', 83'; Monteiro 67'; Sahayam (yellow card) 69'; Rhodes (yellow card) 87'	Report	Skerten (yellow card) 33'; Day 42'; Davies (yellow card) 58' (goal) 88'; Skerten (yellow card) 69'	Stadium: Fergusson Park; Referee: Robert Orchard

11 May 2024	Ellerslie (3)	3–1	Otorohanga (5)	Ellerslie
15:00	Fusha 18'; Ansley 50'; Poelman 90' (pen.)	Report	Ball 56' (pen.)	Stadium: Michaels Avenue Reserve; Referee: Othmane Jebli

11 May 2024	Papamoa (4)	1–5	Fencibles United (3)	Papamoa Beach
17:00	Kilpatrick 50'; Pamment (yellow card) 65'; Peverley (yellow card) 86'; Herbert (red card) 90+2'	Report	Papa 64'; Burns 69', 87'; Clarke 78'; Reynolds 84'; Ronney (yellow card) 90+4'	Stadium: Gordon Spratt Stadium; Referee: Zhijun Chen

11 May 2024	Waitemata (4)	3–0	AFC Bohemian Celtic (SUN)	Te Atatū South
17:30	Hargood 10', 55'; Webster 48'; Murphy (yellow card) 86'	Report	Forsythe (yellow card) 26'; Gibbons (yellow card) 50' (yellow-red card) 90'; O'Loughlin (yellow card) 59'	Stadium: McLeod Park; Referee: Boaz Peach

12 May 2024	Northern Rovers (3)	2–0	Mount Albert Ponsonby (3)	Glenfield
14:00	Bracken 39' (pen.); Mupemhena 66'; Bartlett (yellow card) 72'	Report	Turton (yellow card) 28'; Foster (yellow card) 89'; Orduna (yellow card) 90+7'; Borquez (yellow card) 90+11'	Stadium: McFetridge Park; Referee: Aaron Day

Central Region

11 May 2024	Palmerston North Marist (3)	3–0	Havelock North Wanderers (3)	Palmerston North Central
12:00	Farmer (yellow card) 25'; Carrick 57'; Ralph 71' (o.g.); Steele 85'	Report	Kitching-Nicholson (yellow card) 66'; Miller (yellow card) 66'; MacKirdy (yellow card) 68'	Stadium: Arena Turf; Referee: Andy Parker

11 May 2024	Palmerston North United (3)	6–0	Peringa United (3)	Terrace End
14:00	Cooksley 9', 42'; Mori 25', 27', 85'; Richardson 67'; Craven (yellow card) 75'	Report		Stadium: Memorial Park; Referee: Russell Jones

11 May 2024	Paekākāriki (8)	0–4	Victoria University (4)	Paekākāriki
14:00	Pownall (yellow card) 23'; Beesley (yellow card) 41'	Report	Lockwood 37'; Nicholson 42' (pen.); Ward 67' (o.g.); Stenner Corbishley 85'	Stadium: Campbell Park; Referee: Jason Andrews

11 May 2024	Brooklyn Northern United (4)	0–9	Upper Hutt City (3)	Island Bay
14:00	Sowersby (yellow card) 16'; Fisher (yellow card) 71'; Araujo (yellow card) 88'; Pocock (yellow card) 90+2' (yellow-red card) 90+2'	Report	Gahan 4'; Postlethwaite 31'; Wenster 35', 42', 44'; Porter-Wallis 37'; Marshall 70'; Fong 81'; Warbrick 90+1'	Stadium: Wakefield Park; Referee: Nigel Piper

11 May 2024	Stokes Valley (5)	2–6	Seatoun (3)	Taitā
14:00	Senkel 79' (o.g.); Jackson 90+3'	Report	Springgay 12' (o.g.); da Vanzo 44'; Fraser 47'; Alnou 48', 72'; Hey 90+1'	Stadium: Fraser Park; Referee: David Beattie

11 May 2024	Tawa (3)	5–2	Greytown (5)	Tawa
14:00	Farah 8'; Rose (red card) 15'; La 19', 74'; Kumar (yellow card) 65'; Fouhy 76'; Quinn 90+2'	Report	Parker 51'; Palmer (yellow card) 86'; Wiegman 88'	Stadium: Redwood Park; Referee: Matt Harrison

Nelson / Marlborough Bays Region

11 May 2024	Nelson Suburbs (2)	5–0	Richmond Athletic (5)	Stoke
14:30		Report		Stadium: Saxton Fields; Referee: Gary Walton

11 May 2024	Tahuna (5)	2–3 (a.e.t.)	FC Nelson (5)	Nelson City
14:30	Watson 2', 85'; Owen (yellow card) 4'; Bollier (yellow card) 90'	Report	Lian 79', 94'; Cen Hiang 81'	Stadium: Tahunanui; Referee: Brian Renwick

Canterbury Region

10 May 2024	Christchurch United (2)	5–2	Western (3)	Yaldhurst
19:00	Cole 30'; Meyn 53'; Yoo 57', 90' (pen.); Chao 70'	Report	Steffert 67', 76'	Stadium: United Sports Centre; Referee: Craig Duff

11 May 2024	Waimakariri United (3)	0–1 (a.e.t.)	University of Canterbury (2)	Kaiapoi
14:00	Harrison (yellow card) 48'; Loney (yellow card) 55'; Reid (yellow card) 102'; Brandso (yellow card) 120+2' (yellow-red card) 120+2'	Report	Killick 94'; Toro Perez (yellow card) 99'	Stadium: Kendall Park Turf; Referee: Michael Love

11 May 2024	Nomads United (2)	4–0	Halswell United (3)	Casebrook
14:00	Cottom 3', 70'; Goldsmith 5', 26'; Stewart (yellow card) 21'	Report	Cameron (yellow card) 89'	Stadium: Tulett Park; Referee: Caleb Downes

11 May 2024	Cashmere Technical (1)	11–0	Burwood (3)	Woolston
14:30	Gallaway 23'; Taguchi 37', 45+4'; Matthysen 45+2'; McIsaac 45+6', 51', 72', 89'; Barbour-Ryan 49', 80'; Ballard 68'	Report	Braithwaite (yellow card) 3' (yellow-red card) 10'; Malpass (yellow card) 22'; Davies (yellow card) 60'; Wooddin (yellow card) 64'; Toye (yellow card) 86'	Stadium: Garrick Memorial Park; Referee: Alex McDowall

11 May 2024	Selwyn United (2)	0–3	Ferrymead Bays (2)	Rolleston
15:00	McKay (yellow card) 17'; Jerkovic (yellow card) 45'	Report	Murphy 33'; Fairley 39'; Taylor (yellow card) 48'; Williams 52'	Stadium: Foster Park; Referee: Michael Killick

12 May 2024	Coastal Spirit (1)	3–0	FC Twenty 11 (2)	Linwood
11:00	Stanley 2'; Hayashi 43'; Steinwascher 79'	Report	Foster (yellow card) 52'; Eady (yellow card) 82'	Stadium: Linfield Park; Referee: Ryan Mahalm

Southern Region

11 May 2024	Geraldine (4)	1–3 (a.e.t.)	Otago University (3)	Geraldine
14:00	Vasqueto (yellow card) 4' (yellow-red card) 45'; Gonzalez 34'; Vallejo (yellow card) 40'; Fica Mendoza (yellow card) 46'; Alvez Buzo (yellow card) 113'	Report	Clegg 3', 111', 114'	Stadium: Geraldine 1 Referee: Aaron Collins

11 May 2024	Green Island (3)	1–0	Queens Park (3)	Green Island
14:00	Smith 67'; Thorn (yellow card) 69'	Report		Stadium: Sunnyvale Park; Referee: Wayne van Gorp

11 May 2024	Wanaka (3)	4–1	West End (4)	Wānaka
14:00	Rodwell 45+3'; Thomson 65' (o.g.); Carmichael 76'; Curtis (yellow card) 85'; Brum 90+1'	Report; Scorers	Cox 23'	Stadium: Wanaka Recreation Centre; Referee: Lindsey Robinson

11 May 2024	Northern Hearts (3)	5–1	Grants Braes (4)	Timaru
14:00	Chambers 49', 66'; Hayes 56' (yellow card) 90'; White 74'; Hancock 84'	Report	Cole (yellow card) 46'; Parsons 72' (pen.); Williamson (yellow card) 87'	Stadium: Aorangi Park; Referee: Hayden Wederell

11 May 2024	Roslyn Wakari (3)	4–1	Queenstown (3)	Dunedin
14:00	Wilkie 19'; Tolo-Kent (yellow card) 37'; Smith 69', 80', 90+4'	Report	Pun Perez (yellow card) 57'; Greengrass 84'	Stadium: Ellis Park; Referee: Bruce James

11 May 2024	Thistle (4)	0–15	Mosgiel (3)	Invercargill
15:00	Hawkes (yellow card) 75'	Report	Burtenshaw 3'; Donaldson 5', 48'; Quarrell 11', 17', 49', 62', 86'; Stephens 23'; Findlay 53'; She 69' (o.g.); Duncan 71', 88', 90+1'; McCully 83'	Stadium: ILT Football Turf; Referee: Zac Gargiulo

11 May 2024	Northern (3)	12–0	Waihopai (4)	Dunedin North
15:00	Hibbert 2', 28', 29', 35', 45+1'; Cosgrove 24'; Muir 26'; Teitelbaum 44'; Williams 61', 82'; Baird-Hodge 63'; Mandich 90+1'	Report	Hurtado Andrade (yellow card) 51'; Melligan (yellow card) 85'	Stadium: Caledonian Ground; Referee: Mason Robinson

=== Round 2 ===
Matches were played over the of King's Birthday weekend of 31 May – 3 June. This round contains four teams from tier 5; Central United, FC Nelson, Northern United, South Auckland Rangers, which are the lowest-ranked teams left in the competition.

Number of teams per tier still in competition
Tier 1+2	Tier 3	Tier 4	Tier 5, 6, 8, 9	Sunday League	Total
30 / 32	21 / 37	9 / 25	4 / 30	0 / 4	64 / 128

Northern Region

30 May 2024	Birkenhead United (1)	4–1	West Coast Rangers (2)	Beach Haven
19:00	Patterson 12'; McArthur 16'; van den Hoven 62' (pen.); Hughes 88'	Report	Alama 30'	Stadium: Shepherds Park; Referee: Nick Waldron

31 May 2024	Northern United (5)	2–4	Cambridge (4)	Rototuna North
19:00	Kerr-Bell (yellow card) 17'; Jessep 21', 71' (pen.); Brown (yellow card) 69'; Abbott (yellow card) 73'; Surgison (yellow card) 81' (yellow-red card) 89'	Report	J. Clarkin 14', 24'; Nabizada (yellow card) 53'; Portegys 63'; D. Clarkin 66'; Shaw (yellow card) 67'	Stadium: Korikori Park; Referee: Andres Castro

1 June 2024	Waikato Unicol (4)	0–1	Ellerslie (3)	Hillcrest
14:00		Report	Oosterhof 58'; Emery (yellow card) 61'	Stadium: Waikato University; Referee: Phillip Rogers

1 June 2024	East Coast Bays (2)	1–2	Eastern Suburbs (1)	Oteha
14:00	Young 9'; Jones (yellow card) 41' (yellow-red card) 88'; Caunter (yellow card) 56'; Nkoy (yellow card) After Match'	Report	Mechell 20'; de Vries 57'; Raj (yellow card) 90+6'	Stadium: Bay City Park; Referee: Luke Gardner

1 June 2024	Otumoetai (4)	0–4	Onehunga Mangere United (3)	Matua
14:00	Caldwell (yellow card) 35'; Clark (yellow card) 37'; Smyth (yellow card) 47' (yellow-red card) 60'	Report	Shipman 39' (pen.); Smith 67'; Minto 69'; Oliver 79'	Stadium: Fergusson Park; Referee: Andy Holdsworth

1 June 2024	Auckland City (1)	5–0	Metro (3)	Sandringham
14:00	Howieson 8' (pen.), 67'; Garriga 12'; de Vries 58'; Kilkolly 90'	Report	Campbell (yellow card) 7'	Stadium: Kiwitea Street; Referee: Othmane Jebli

1 June 2024	Waiheke United (4)	0–3	Manurewa (2)	Waiheke Island
14:00	Mena (yellow card) 10'; Miranda (yellow card) 12'; Llunes (yellow card) 36'; Candy (yellow card) 73'; Ciganda (red card) 79'; Yacar (yellow card) After Match'	Report	Eng (yellow card) 7'; Lagos (yellow card) 21' (goal) 90'; Sakashita 57'; Echague 59'; Blakeman-Smith (yellow card) 65'	Stadium: Onetangi Sports Complex; Referee: Beth Rattray

1 June 2024	North Shore United (3)	2–3	Melville United (2)	Devonport
14:00	Moore 31'; Petherick (yellow card) 36' (goal) 63'	Report	Knox (yellow card) 44'; Panzer 76', 84'; Lim 81'	Stadium: Allen Hill Stadium; Referee: Nick Kang

1 June 2024	Taupo (4)	3–2	Waitemata (4)	Tauhara
14:00	O'Donoghue 10', 80' (pen.) (yellow card) 90+3'; Webster 83' (o.g.)	Report	Hargood 12'; Kochasira 23' (yellow card) 61'; Andrell (yellow card) 64'	Stadium: Crown Park; Referee: Benjamin Norman

1 June 2024	Bucklands Beach (4)	2–3	Hibiscus Coast (3)	Pakuranga Heights
14:00	Smith 19'; Waterland 36' (pen.) (yellow card) 73'; Lonergan (yellow card) 79'	Report	Stevenson 35'; Kirkpatrick (yellow card) 35'; Mayes (yellow card) 35' (goal) 50'; Martin (yellow card) 45'; Coe 69'	Stadium: Lloyd Elsmore Park; Referee: Shawn Liu

1 June 2024	Fencibles United (3)	1–3	Tauranga City (2)	Pakuranga Heights
15:00	Bunch 23'; Mason (yellow card) 29'	Report	Bidois 1', 24' (yellow card) 29'; Molloy (yellow card) 64'; Reid 70'	Stadium: Riverhills Park; Referee: Reza Al Rabea

1 June 2024	Western Springs (1)	7–0	Northern Rovers (3)	Western Springs
17:30	Drake 8', 27', 90+2'; Tade 15', 19'; Ellis 32'; McGavin 71'	Report	Bartlett (yellow card) 65'	Stadium: Seddon Fields; Referee: Kirk Davis

1 June 2024	Bay Olympic (2)	1–0	Manukau United (3)	New Lynn
17:30	Nadier 12'; Kostandini Ziu (yellow card) 29'	Report	Rotimi (yellow card) 38'; Nabenu (yellow card) 60'; Ozawa (yellow card) 70'; Castro Pereyra (yellow card) 72'; Chawira (yellow card) 90+6'	Stadium: Olympic Park; Referee: Jack Henderson

2 June 2024	South Auckland Rangers (5)	1–6	Hamilton Wanderers (2)	Flat Bush
14:00	Doli (yellow card) 15' (goal) 35'; Rakula (yellow card) 55'	Report	Mitchell 35' (yellow card) 70'; Brown 47', 65'; Sharma (yellow card) 85' 86' (o.g.); Brooke-Smith 90+4'; Fellowes 90+10'	Stadium: Rongomai Park; Referee: Dylan Kawana Alexander Waugh

3 June 2024	Central United (5)	5–0	Beachlands Maraetai (4)	Sandringham
14:00	Lloyd 4'; Luque 13', 55'; Kucija 52'; Lazarus 88'	Report		Stadium: Kiwitea Street; Referee: Charlie Tseng

3 June 2024	Auckland United (2)	4–1	Ngaruawahia United (3)	Mount Roskill
17:00	Chung (yellow card) 28'; Wallace 37' (pen.); Heuberger 41' (o.g.); Mandizvidza (yellow card) 52'; Atkinson 71'; Singh 90' (pen.)	Report	Palma 19'; Henderson (yellow card) 22'; Perez (red card) 35'; Grunwald (yellow card) 37' (yellow-red card) 45'; Boon (yellow card) 90+3'	Stadium: Keith Hay Park; Referee: Ashley Wilson

Central Region

31 May 2024	Wellington Olympic (1)	4–0	Seatoun (3)	Island Bay
18:30	Nguyen 10', 21'; Coustrain 49'; Davenport Petersen (yellow card) 60'; Thurston (yellow card) 90+1'; Davies 90+4'	Report	Alnou (yellow card) 86'	Stadium: Wakefield Park; Referee: Jordan Boyd

1 June 2024	Island Bay United (2)	1–2	Petone (2)	Island Bay
14:00	Thomson (yellow card) 23'; Kirkland 64'	Report	O'Connor 43'; Khaled 82'	Stadium: Wakefield Park; Referee: Jordan Williams

1 June 2024	Western Suburbs (1)	6–0	Victoria University (4)	Whitby
14:00	Davies 4', 90' (o.g.); Miller 18'; Green 22'; Fautley (yellow card) 45+2'; Moyo 45+6'; Marlow-Jones 66'	Report	Nicholson (yellow card) 32'	Stadium: Endeavour Park; Referee: Jan Chmielewski

1 June 2024	Upper Hutt City (3)	1–2	Waterside Karori (2)	Upper Hutt
14:00	Webster 46'	Report	Candy 53', 90+6'; Street (yellow card) 85'	Stadium: Maidstone Park; Referee: Chris Bennett

1 June 2024	Miramar Rangers (2)	6–0	Tawa (3)	Miramar
14:00	Bueno 3'; Contratti 37'; Cameron 42', 49'; Rogerson 63'; Gates 88'	Report	McFadyen (yellow card) 45+3'; Scott (yellow card) 81'	Stadium: David Farrington Park; Referee: Nigel Piper

2 June 2024	Napier City Rovers (1)	10–0	Palmerston North Marist (3)	Poraiti
14:00	McNamara 5', 11' (pen.), 32', 76'; Hewson 7', 36'; Stanley 12'; Lack 34', 37', 41' (yellow card) 65'	Report	Cowan (yellow card) 22'	Stadium: Bluewater Stadium; Referee: Matthew Hastings

3 June 2024	Wellington Phoenix Reserves (1)	1–4	North Wellington (2)	Taitā
14:00	Keetley 21' (o.g.); Partridge (yellow card) 62'; Thomas (yellow card) 75'; Huxford (yellow card) 79'; Pratt (yellow card) 79'; Walker (yellow card) 90+6'	Report	Keetley (yellow card) 63'; Wardlaw 40'; Zatorski 44', 58' (pen.); Newman 51'; Sinclair (yellow card) 83'	Stadium: Fraser Park; Referee: Cameron Gruschow

3 June 2024	Palmerston North United (3)	1–1 (a.e.t.) (4–5 p)	Stop Out (2)	Terrace End
14:00	McDougall (yellow card) 32'; Mori 76'	Report	Juru (yellow card) 35'; Kelly 64'; Jelley (yellow card) 85'; Cosgrave (yellow card) 108'	Stadium: Memorial Park; Referee: Campbell-Kirk Kawana-Waugh

Nelson / Marlborough Bays Region

2 June 2024	Nelson Suburbs (2)	1–2	FC Nelson (5)	Stoke
12:00	Moffat 18'; Carter (yellow card) 78'	Report	Pan 69', 76'	Stadium: Saxton Fields; Referee: Iain MacFadyen

Canterbury Region

31 May 2024	Ferrymead Bays (2)	2–1	University of Canterbury (2)	Ferrymead
19:15	Deehan (yellow card) 14'; Bryant (yellow card) 23'; Wasaki 55'; Fairley 59'	Report	Gaines (yellow card) 54'; de Raat (yellow card) 76'; Killick 77'	Stadium: Ferrymead Park; Referee: Caleb Downes

1 June 2024	Nomads United (2)	3–2	Christchurch United (2)	Casebrook
14:00	J. Holland (yellow card) 3' (yellow-red card) 84'; McIntyre 36'; Holdem 47', 70'; Goldsmith (yellow card) 76'; W. Holland (yellow card) 83'; Abdi (yellow card) 90+4'; Cottom (yellow card) 90+4'	Report	Yoo 65'; Stevens 86'	Stadium: Tulett Park; Referee: Nick Burnett

1 June 2024	Coastal Spirit (1)	3–1	Cashmere Technical (1)	Linwood
14:00	Hale 11'; Hoole 13'; Rabuka 26' (yellow card) 63'; Stearn (yellow card) 76'	Report	Matthysen 36' (yellow card) 58'; McIsaac (yellow card) 55'; Lapslie (yellow card) 61'	Stadium: Linfield Park; Referee: Ben O'Connell

Southern Region

1 June 2024	Green Island (3)	0–1	Otago University (3)	Green Island
14:00	Dore (yellow card) 36'	Report	Hodson 4'; Campbell (yellow card) 39'	Stadium: Sunnyvale Park; Referee: Bruce James

1 June 2024	Dunedin City Royals (2)	4–1	Wanaka (3)	Dunedin North
14:00	Zambrano 16', 36' (pen.); Williams 87'; Turner 87'	Report	Martins de Sousa 29'	Stadium: Football Turf; Referee: Wayne van Gorp

1 June 2024	Northern Hearts (3)	1–6	Roslyn Wakari (3)	Timaru
14:00	McLaughlin 39'	Report	Wall 5'; Wilkie 13' (pen.), 18', 54'; Anderson 75'; Willams-Davies 77'; Salisbury (yellow card) 87'	Stadium: Aorangi Park; Referee: Aaron Collins

1 June 2024	Northern (3)	5–4 (a.e.t.)	Mosgiel (3)	Dunedin North
19:00	Cosgrove 36'; Muir 54', 60'; Hibbert (yellow card) 83'; Simons 115'; Gorman 117'	Report	Reynolds (red card) 40'; Findlay 45+1', 60', 90+3'; Stephens 93'; Roberts (yellow card) 97'	Stadium: Caledonian Ground; Referee: Calvin Berg

=== Round 3 ===
Matches will be played over the weekend of 14 – 16 June. This round contains two teams from tier 5 — Central United and FC Nelson — which are the lowest-ranked teams left in the competition.

Number of teams per tier still in competition
Tier 1+2	Tier 3	Tier 4	Tier 5, 6, 8, 9	Sunday League	Total
22 / 32	6 / 37	2 / 25	2 / 30	0 / 4	32 / 128

Northern Region

14 June 2024	Auckland United (2)	1–2 (a.e.t.)	Manurewa (2)	Mount Roskill
19:00	Wallace 77'; Curry (yellow card) 90+4'; Haviland (yellow card) 107'	Report	Echague (yellow card) 18'; Ramirez 47'; Sakashita (yellow card) 65'; Patkevych 117'; Eng (yellow card) 118'	Stadium: Keith Hay Park; Referee: Riley Greenbury

15 June 2024	Central United (5)	0–4	Birkenhead United (1)	Sandringham
14:00	Everett (yellow card) 21'; Hiscotte (yellow card) 79'	Report	Philip 49'; Zeb 52'; Jorgensen (yellow card) 54' (goal) 86'; Taylor 90+4'	Stadium: Kiwitea Street; Referee: Johnathon Smith

15 June 2024	Melville United (2)	3–1	Tauranga City (2)	Hamilton Lake
14:00	Boss 15'; Lim 33', 43'	Report	Toy (yellow card) 38'; Brennan 87'	Stadium: Gower Park; Referee: Andres Castro

15 June 2024	Hibiscus Coast (3)	4–0	Taupo (4)	Stanmore Bay
14:00	Agiovlassitis 34'; Mayes 39'; Darkwa (yellow card) 54'; Stevenson 70'; Brown (yellow card) 83'	Report	Smith (yellow card) 30'; Foster 41' (o.g.)	Stadium: Stanmore Bay Park; Referee: Kester Rebello

15 June 2024	Ellerslie (3)	1–3	Onehunga Mangere United (3)	Ellerslie
17:30	Rathbone (yellow card) 45' (yellow-red card) 52'; Emery (yellow card) 57'; Durkin 88'	Report	Smith 46', 56'; Minto (yellow card) 50'; Khalil 61'	Stadium: Michaels Avenue Reserve; Referee: Hayden Tutbury

15 June 2024	Western Springs (1)	3–2 (a.e.t.)	Eastern Suburbs (1)	Western Springs
17:30	Tade 33'; Knowles 42' (o.g.); Manuel (yellow card) 90'; Drake 109'; Ramsay (yellow card) 116'	Report	Rutherford 21'; McKenlay 65' (yellow card) 105+1'; Billingsley (yellow card) 69'; Strong (yellow card) 74'	Stadium: Seddon Fields; Referee: Luke Gardner

15 June 2024	Bay Olympic (2)	1–2	Cambridge (4)	New Lynn
17:30	Saxon 52'; Gregory (yellow card) 83'; Hameedi (yellow card) 90+5'; Nadir (yellow card) 90+'	Report	Clarkin 22' (yellow card) 45+3'; Connor 41' (pen.)	Stadium: Olympic Park; Referee: Stephen Merriman

16 June 2024	Auckland City (1)	2–1	Hamilton Wanderers (2)	Sandringham
14:00	Gillion 15'; Kilkolly 53'	Report	Campbell (yellow card) 44'; Brooke-Smith 63'	Stadium: Kiwitea Street; Referee: Nick Waldron

Central Region

15 June 2024	Wellington Olympic (1)	5–0	Western Suburbs (1)	Island Bay
14:00	Coustrain 3', 19'; Dimairo (yellow card) 16'; Mata 26'; Sinclair 32'; Prins 48' (yellow card) 75'	Report	Scott (yellow card) 43'; Diamond (yellow card) 53'	Stadium: Wakefield Park; Referee: Peter Linney

15 June 2024	Waterside Karori (2)	0–1	Miramar Rangers (2)	Karori
14:00		Report	Bueno 66'; Fenton (yellow card) 90+4'	Stadium: Karori Park; Referee: James Berry

15 June 2024	Petone (2)	3–3 (a.e.t.) (2–4 p)	Stop Out (2)	Petone
14:00	Khaled (yellow card) 44'; Eglinton (yellow card) 32' (goal) 45'; Whitecliffe 83'; Pickering 94'; Wall (yellow card) 100'; Shearer (yellow card) 115'	Report	Ruawhare 25'; Sutcliffe (yellow card) 44'; Coleman 77'; Gaul 105' (pen.)	Stadium: Petone Memorial Park; Referee: Chris Bennett

16 June 2024	Napier City Rovers (1)	2–1	North Wellington (2)	Poraiti
14:00	McNamara (red card) 53'; Emerson 58' (yellow card) 76'; Schofield (yellow card) 76' (goal) 85'	Report	Newman 26'; Zatorski (yellow card) 83'; Wardlaw (yellow card) 90+3'	Stadium: Bluewater Stadium; Referee: Dylan Waugh

Southern Region

15 June 2024	Dunedin City Royals (2)	6–0	Roslyn Wakari (3)	Dunedin North
13:00	Zambrano 17'; Turner 28'; August 64'; Mairs 68'; Clark 73'; Julian 76'	Report	Anderson (yellow card) 39' (yellow-red card) 72'; Wilkie (yellow card) 45+2'	Stadium: Logan Park; Referee: Jan-hendrik Kuepper

15 June 2024	Northern (3)	1–2	Otago University (3)	Dunedin North
19:00	Baird-Hodge (yellow card) 79'; Williams (yellow card) 79'; Muir 84' (red card) 85'	Report	Campbell 19'; Clegg 79'	Stadium: Caledonian Ground; Referee: Caleb Marsh

16 June 2024	FC Nelson (5)	1–3	Ferrymead Bays (2)	The Wood
13:00	Pan 89' (pen.)	Report	Deehan 48' (pen.); R. Williams (yellow card) 60'; C. Murphy 89'; Rean 89'	Stadium: Guppy Park; Referee: Iain MacFadyen

16 June 2024	Coastal Spirit (1)	1–0	Nomads United (2)	Bromley
13:00	Steinwascher (yellow card) 24' (goal) 31'; Taqizada (yellow card) 87'; Hoole (yellow card) 87'	Report	Bushell (yellow card) 24'; W. Holland (yellow card) 45+1'; Goldsmith (yellow card) 90+1'	Stadium: Linfield Park; Referee: Ralph Clink

=== Round 4 ===
Matches were played over the weekend of 5 – 7 July. This round contained one team from tier 4 — Cambridge — which is the lowest-ranked team left in the competition. Winner of Ferrymead Bays v Coastal Spirit is also the MacFarlane Cup. (Note: MacFarlane Cup is awarded to the last remaining Canterbury side left in the Chatham Cup.)

Number of teams per tier still in competition
Tier 1+2	Tier 3	Tier 4	Tier 5, 6, 8, 9	Sunday League	Total
12 / 32	3 / 37	1 / 25	0 / 30	0 / 4	16 / 128

Northern Region

6 July 2024	Cambridge (4)	1–4	Auckland City (1)	Cambridge
13:00	Clarkin 38' (yellow card) 72'	Report	Garriga 35'; Gray 45'; Kilkolly 53'; Lee (yellow card) 65'; Murati 80'	Stadium: John Kerkhof Park; Referee: Phillip Rogers

6 July 2024	Melville United (2)	0–1	Hibiscus Coast (3)	Hamilton Lake
14:00	Panzer (yellow card) 61'; Bates (yellow card) 80'	Report	Darkwa 16'; Agiovlassitis (yellow card) 69'; Stevenson (yellow card) 90+1'	Stadium: Gower Park; Referee: Benjamin Norman

6 July 2024	Manurewa (2)	3–2 (a.e.t.)	Onehunga Mangere United (3)	Manurewa
14:00	Ramirez 27', 114' (pen.); Khan 62'	Report	Oliver 59'; Sutton 90'	Stadium: War Memorial Park; Referee: Ashley Wilson

6 July 2024	Western Springs (1)	3–3 (a.e.t.) (5–6 p)	Birkenhead United (1)	Western Springs
17:30	Drake 45', 103' (yellow card) 113'; Tade 85' (yellow card) 120+1'; Manuel (yellow card) 98'	Report	Cromb (yellow card) 41'; Piper (yellow card) 45'; Patterson 64' (pen.), 83'; Philip (yellow card) 66'; Jorgensen (yellow card) 80'; Botica (yellow card) 104'; Zeb 111'	Stadium: Seddon Fields; Referee: Nick Waldron

Central Region

6 July 2024	Wellington Olympic (1)	8–0	Stop Out (2)	Island Bay
14:00	Mata 2', 36', 40' (pen.); Prins 28'; Bouzoukis 52', 62' (pen.), 84'; Wilkinson 68'; Rudland (yellow card) 79'	Report	Weitzel (yellow card) 77'	Stadium: Wakefield Park; Referee: Chris Bennett

7 July 2024	Napier City Rovers (1)	2–1	Miramar Rangers (2)	Poraiti
14:00	Faulds 57', 89'; Jones (yellow card) 72'	Report	Bevin 23'; Contratti (yellow card) 36' (yellow-red card) After match'	Stadium: Bluewater Stadium; Referee: Russell Jones

Southern Region

5 July 2024	Ferrymead Bays (2)	3–5 (a.e.t.)	Coastal Spirit (1)	Ferrymead
19:00	Wasaki 4'; Mathieson (yellow card) 16'; Meaclem 41' (o.g.); Stewart 120'	Report	Steinwascher 18'; Bell (yellow card) 34' (goal) 61'; Hoole (yellow card) 63'; Stanley (yellow card) 78' (goal) 96'; Rabuka 117', 118'	Stadium: Ferrymead Park; Referee: Hayden McCabe

7 July 2024	Otago University (3)	3–2	Dunedin City Royals (2)	Dunedin North
14:00	Husheer 12'; Hodson 27'; Campbell 30'; Murray (yellow card) 47'; Stamers-Smith (yellow card) 84'	Report	Jack 20'; Collings 45+1'	Stadium: Logan Park; Referee: Gary Boyles

=== Quarter-finals ===
Matches will be played over the weekend of 26 – 28 July. This round contained two team from tier 3 — Hibiscus Coast and Otago University — which are the lowest-ranked teams left in the competition.

Number of teams per tier still in competition
Tier 1+2	Tier 3	Tier 4	Tier 5, 6, 8, 9	Sunday League	Total
6 / 32	2 / 37	0 / 25	0 / 30	0 / 4	8 / 128

27 July 2024	Hibiscus Coast (3)	3–3 (a.e.t.) (5–6 p)	Coastal Spirit (1)	Stanmore Bay
14:00	Cyra 45'; Dickinson 52' (yellow card) 114'; Windelburn 108'; Brown (yellow card) 118'; Odoom (yellow card) 120+4'; Tyler (yellow card) 120+4'	Report	Steainwascher 18'; Hoole 55', 112'; Hirano (yellow card) 114'; Stearn (yellow card) 119'	Stadium: Stanmore Bay Park; Referee: Ashley Wilson
	Penalties
	Dickinson (penalty scored); Browne (penalty scored); Odoom (penalty scored); Precious (penalty scored); Agiovlassiis (penalty scored); Tyler (penalty missed)		Stearn (penalty scored); Steinwascher (penalty scored); Boys (penalty scored); Taqizada (penalty scored); Hoole (penalty scored); Hirano (penalty scored)

27 July 2024	Wellington Olympic (1)	4–0	Manurewa (2)	Island Bay
14:00	Watson 44', 59' (yellow card) 84'; Mata 51'; Dimairo (yellow card) 69'; Nguyen 90+3'; Tongue (yellow card) 90+7'	Report	Hoyt (yellow card) 11'; Morris (yellow card) 24'; Ramirez (red card) 69'; Sakashita (yellow card) 90+7'	Stadium: Wakefield Park; Referee: Andres Castro

27 July 2024	Otago University (3)	1–5	Auckland City (1)	Dunedin North
18:00	Buyck 45+2'	Report	Kilkolly 34', 51', 87'; Tieku 41'; Bell (yellow card) 66'; McBride 89' (o.g.)	Stadium: Logan Park; Referee: Ben O'Connell

28 July 2024	Napier City Rovers (1)	1–2	Birkenhead United (1)	Poraiti
14:00	Albertini (yellow card) 21' (goal) 46'; Schofield (yellow card) 73'	Report	Piper 23'; Patterson 33'; O'Leary (yellow card) 43'	Stadium: Bluewater Stadium; Referee: Cory Mills

=== Semi-finals ===
Matches were played over the weekend of 16 – 18 August. This round featured four teams from the National League regional leagues (tier 2); Two teams from Northern League: Auckland City, Birkenhead United, one team from Central League: Wellington Olympic, one team from Southern League: Coastal Spirit.

Number of teams per tier still in competition
Tier 1+2	Tier 3	Tier 4	Tier 5, 6, 8, 9	Sunday League	Total
4 / 32	0 / 37	0 / 25	0 / 30	0 / 4	4 / 128

18 August 2024	Coastal Spirit (1)	1–5	Wellington Olympic (1)	Linwood
13:00	Steinwascher 13'; Taqizada (yellow card) 59'; Cotter (yellow card) 65'	Report	Watson 18', 80'; Sinclair 53' (yellow card) 77'; Prins 72', 83'	Stadium: Linfield Park; Referee: Cory Mills

18 August 2024	Auckland City (1)	4–2 (a.e.t.)	Birkenhead United (1)	Sandringham
14:00	den Heijer (yellow card) 6'; Mitchell (yellow card) 34'; Kilkolly 43' (pen.), 99', 120+4'; de Vries 56'; Garriga (yellow card) 88'; Ukich (yellow card) 89'; Zhou (yellow card) 116'	Report	Patterson 33'; Cromb (yellow card) 45'; Philip 68'; Botica (yellow card) 79'	Stadium: Kiwitea Street; Referee: Mark Rule

=== Final ===
7 September 2024
19:00

Wellington Olympic	1–1	Auckland City
Lobo 77' (o.g.)	Report	Ukich 90+6'
Penalties
Mata (penalty scored); Gulley (penalty scored); Prins (penalty scored); Hoy (penalty scored); Watson (penalty scored)	5–4	(penalty scored) Heijer; (penalty scored) Ukich; (penalty scored) Ilich; (penalty scored) Tieku; (penalty missed) Zhou

North Harbour Stadium, Auckland
Referee: Luke Gardner

== Broadcasting rights ==
FIFA+ have the broadcasting rights for the 2024 season.

Round	Date	Kick-off	Teams
Round 2	1 June	2:00pm	Coastal Spirit v Cashmere Technical
Round 3	15 June	5:30pm	Western Springs v Eastern Suburbs
Round 4	6 July	2:00pm	Napier City Rovers v Miramar Rangers
Quarter-final	27 July	2:00pm	Hibiscus Coast v Coastal Spirit
Quarter-final	27 July	2:00pm	Wellington Olympic v Manurewa
Quarter-final	27 July	6:00pm	Otago University v Auckland City
Quarter-final	28 July	2:00pm	Napier City Rovers v Birkenhead United
Semi-final	18 August	1:00pm	Coastal Spirit v Wellington Olympic
Semi-final	18 August	2:00pm	Auckland City v Birkenhead United
Final	7 September	7:00pm	Wellington Olympic v Auckland City

== Notes ==
The tiers that teams are in (as indicated in brackets next to their name) are based on the New Zealand football league system for the 2024 season. As some teams can qualify and play in more than one league (and tier) per season, the highest tier that they took part in at the time of the cup matches is the one noted next to their name.
