= 2024 Charity Cup =

Association football championship match

- The match programme cover
Wellington Olympic	Christchurch United
3	0
- Date: 3 March 2024
- Venue: Martin Luckie Park, Wellington
- Referee: Cory Mills

The 2024 Charity Cup was the 20th Charity Cup, an annual football match played between the winners of the previous season's New Zealand National League and Chatham Cup competitions. It took place at Martin Luckie Park on 3 March 2024. This was the first edition since the introduction of the National League in 2021. As the home side, Wellington Olympic selected Heart Kids New Zealand as their charity.

Wellington Olympic won the game 3–0 winning their first Charity Cup. Christchurch United lost for their second time since the inaugural NZFA Challenge Trophy in 1978.

The match was live streamed for free on FIFA+ and New Zealand Football's YouTube channel.

Auckland City were the defending champions, but they did not qualify for this edition, having failed to win either the National League or Chatham Cup.

== Background ==
Wellington Olympic qualified for the 2024 Charity Cup as winners of the 2023 National League, beating Auckland City in the final. As winners of the National League, Wellington Olympic were assigned as the home team.

Christchurch United were the first side to qualify after winning the Chatham Cup on penalties against Melville United to claim their record-equaling seventh title.

== Match ==
=== Summary ===
In the 33rd minute Gavin Hoy headed the ball back across the box for Ben Mata to head Wellington Olympic into the lead. Hamish Watson doubled Wellington's lead in the 50th minute heading the ball past Steven van Dijk. Joel Coustrain sealed the game in the 75th minute with his first touch of the game. Matt Brazier was sent off in the 86th minute for an off the ball incident.

=== Details ===
3 March 2024
13:00 NZDT

Wellington Olympic	3–0	Christchurch United
Mata 33'; Watson 50'; Coustrain 75'	Report

Martin Luckie Park, Wellington
Referee: Cory Mills

Wellington Olympic	Christchurch United

GK	1	(New Zealand) Scott Basalaj
RB	20	(New Zealand) Tamupiwa Dimairo
CB	5	(New Zealand) Justin Gulley
CB	15	(Cook Islands) Ben Mata (c)		(substituted off) 58'
LB	3	(New Zealand) Adam Supyk
DM	6	(New Zealand) Tor Davenport-Petersen	(yellow card) 38'	(substituted off) 69'
LW	26	(New Zealand) Kaelin Nguyen
CM	23	(Canada) Gavin Hoy
CM	9	(New Zealand) Hamish Watson		(substituted off) 76'
RW	14	(New Zealand) Jack-Henry Sinclair		(substituted off) 58'
CF	10	(New Zealand) Oliver Colloty		(substituted off) 46'
Substitutes:
DF	2	(Fiji) Gabriele Matanisiga		(substituted on) 58'
DF	18	(New Zealand) Luke Tongue		(substituted on) 69'
MF	25	(Republic of Ireland) Joel Coustrain		(substituted on) 74'
FW	11	(England) Kailan Gould	(yellow card) 80'	(substituted on) 46'
FW	17	(New Zealand) Jonty Roubos		(substituted on) 58'
Manager:
(Barbados) Paul Ifill

GK	1	(Netherlands) Steven van Dijk
RB	17	(New Zealand) Joel Peterson		(substituted off) 61'
CB	6	(New Zealand) Riley Grover
CB	4	(Samoa) Kaleb De Groot-Green
LB	3	(Germany) Michael Hornsby
DM	7	(Myanmar) Ta Eh Doe	(yellow card) 64'	(substituted off) 70'
RW	11	(New Zealand) David Yoo		(substituted off) 46'
CM	10	(New Zealand) Eric Imachi Sugahara		(substituted off) 76'
CM	20	(New Zealand) Daniel Meyn		(substituted off) 70'
LW	15	(New Zealand) Joel Stevens (c)
CF	9	(New Zealand) Matt Brazier	(red card) 86'
Substitutes:
MF	5	(New Zealand) Zachary Bennett		(substituted on) 70'
MF	8	(New Zealand) Waisea Henry		(substituted on) 76'
MF	18	(New Zealand) Thomas Chao		(substituted on) 70'
MF	21	(New Zealand) Rico Pradhan		(substituted on) 61'
FW	23	(New Zealand) Jackson Cole		(substituted on) 46'
Manager:
(New Zealand) Ryan Edwards

Assistant referees:
Ashton Davenport
Cameron Gruschow
Fourth official:
Chris Bennett

Match rules

- 90 minutes
- Penalty shoot-out if scores still level
- Five named substitutes, of which all five may be used in three windows
