= 2025 Chatham Cup =

Tournament details
- Country: New Zealand
- Dates: 25 April 2025 – 7 September 2025
- Teams: 122

Final positions
- Champions: Wellington Olympic
- Runners-up: Auckland United

Awards
- Jack Batty Cup: Isa Prins

The 2025 Chatham Cup was New Zealand's 97th annual knockout football competition. It was sponsored by Delivereasy and known as the Delivereasy Chatham Cup for sponsorship reasons.

It had a preliminary round and four rounds proper before quarter-finals, semi-finals, and a final.

== Results ==
=== Preliminary round ===
Matches were played over ANZAC weekend of 25–27 April. This round contained three teams from the Auckland Sunday football leagues — AFC Bohemian Celtic, Colo Boys, and Internationale — which were the lowest-ranked teams in the competition.

Number of teams per tier still in competition
Tier 1+2 (Note: Six Southern League teams joined in the first round. All Northern and Central League teams joined the competition in the second round along with the remaining Southern League teams.)	Tier 3	Tier 4	Tier 5, 6, 8, 9	Sunday League	Total
32 / 32	34 / 34	24 / 24	29 / 29	3 / 3	122 / 122

Northern Region

25 April 2025	West Auckland (6)	1–0	Uni-Mount Bohemian (5)	Kelston
14:00	R. Wilcox 16'	Report		Stadium: Brains Park; Referee: Niklas Arfors

25 April 2025	Te Puke United (5)	0–1	Internationale (SUN)	Te Puke
14:00		Report	Vasconcellos 48'; da Ros (yellow card) 89'	Stadium: Litt Park; Referee: Mark Orchard

25 April 2025	AFC Bohemian Celtic (SUN)	1–4	Te Atatu (5)	Ellerslie
14:00	O'Loughlin 52' (yellow card) 61' (red card) 61'; Haley (yellow card) 65'; Channell 76'	Report	Withers 10' (yellow card) 15'; Hough 13'; Karazmoudeh (yellow card) 21'; Osei 32'; Yusuf 75'	Stadium: Michaels Avenue Reserve; Referee: Scott Moffat

25 April 2025	Papakura City (5)	5–3 (a.e.t.)	Te Awamutu (5)	Papakura
14:00	Martin (yellow card) 11'; Rahani (yellow card) 12'; N. Darby 75'; Vuksanlekaj 85'; Palmer 89', 107', 118'	Report	Young 1'; Roil 37'; King-McRae 83'; Foulkes (yellow card) 102'	Stadium: McLennan Park; Referee: Tony Westmoreland

25 April 2025	Otorohanga (5)	0–2	Franklin United (4)	Ōtorohanga
14:00		Report	Gower-Rudman 10'; Dandajena 18'	Stadium: Otorohanga Domain; Referee: Nigel Hatfield

25 April 2025	South Auckland Rangers (5)	2–0	Albany United (4)	Flat Bush
14:00	Ali 16'; Atiq (yellow card) 66'; Navaba 2', 79', 82'; Hale (yellow card) 90+3'; Rakula 75'	Report	Aravena (yellow card) 89' (yellow-red card) 90+3'	Stadium: Rongomai Park; Referee: Roger Willams

25 April 2025	Mangere United (5)	2–5	Waikato Unicol (5)	Māngere East
14:00	Sohail (yellow card) 34'; Malaeamanu 41'; Ahmed 68'	Report	Salinas 4'; McLeod 6'; Marsh 9'; Gilchrist 11'; Marley 74'	Stadium: Centre Park; Referee: Kristian Klette

25 April 2025	Plains Rangers (6)	1–2	Whakatane Town (5)	Edgecumbe
14:00	McPherson (yellow card) 72'; Awhimate 90+1'	Report	Waters (yellow card) 37'; Owen 58'; Vullings (yellow card) 70'; Mitchell 87' (pen.)	Stadium: Edgecumbe Domain; Referee: Liam Dooley

26 April 2025	Papatoetoe (5)	2–4	Matamata Swifts (4)	Papatoetoe
14:00	S. Singh 41'; Kumar 81'	Report	Abbott 6', 38'; Signal 31'; Martin (yellow card) 45'; Morgan (yellow card) 61'; Costello-McVeigh 76'	Stadium: Murdoch Park; Referee: Edwin Prasad

26 April 2025	Oratia United (5)	0–1 (a.e.t.)	Waiheke United (5)	Glen Eden
14:00	Kapteyn (yellow card) 61'; Whitehead (yellow card) 109'	Report	Mavre (yellow card) 86'; Puentes 110'	Stadium: Parrs Park; Referee: Avi Narayan

3 May 2025	Bream Bay United (6)	3–1	Colo Boys (SUN)	Ruakākā
14:00	K. Mooney 40'; Taylor 48', 89'	Report	Massey (yellow card) 5' (goal) 90+4'	Stadium: Ruakākā Recreation Reserve; Referee: Aaron Hooper
Note: Originally scheduled for 27 April 2025, but was rescheduled due to a waterlogged pitch.

Central Region

27 April 2025	Taradale (3)	2–4	Palmerston North United (3)	Taradale
14:00	Percy-Fysh 22', 28'; L. Hall (yellow card) 60'; Madsen (yellow card) 70'	Report	Tiakiwai-Baker 44'; Carroll 56'; Mori 80'; Jones 89'	Stadium: Taradale Park; Referee: Martin Roil

27 April 2025	Whanganui Athletic (4)	w/o	Waitara (6)	Whanganui East
14:00		Report		Stadium: Wembley Park

27 April 2025	Western Rangers (4)	w/o	FC Western (3)	Raureka
14:00		Report		Stadium: St Leonards Park

27 April 2025	Greytown (5)	1–2 (a.e.t.)	Seatoun (3)	Greytown
14:00	English 65'	Report	Western 70'; Gutierrez (yellow card) 78'; Milton 118'	Stadium: Soldiers Memorial Park; Referee: Ross Fafeita

27 April 2025	Carterton (9)	0–1	Naenae (6)	Carterton
14:00		Report	Western 83'; Gutierrez (yellow card) 88'	Stadium: Howard Booth Park; Referee: Chris Blunden

27 April 2025	Victoria University (4)	1–0	Lower Hutt City (3)	Kelburn
14:00	Wilkinson 26'; Koed Chang (yellow card) 90+1'	Report	Lal (yellow card) 31'	Stadium: Boyd Wilson Turf; Referee: David Beattie

27 April 2025	Stokes Valley (5)	0–4	Wellington Marist (4)	Stokes Valley
14:00	van der Vegt (red card) 50'	Report	Courtis 25', 62'; Sexton 57'; Moger 75' (pen.)	Stadium: Delaney Park; Referee: Russell Uunderwood

27 April 2025	Wellington United (6)	1–3	Tawa (3)	Newtown
14:00	Waller 20'	Report	Lewis (yellow card) 58' (goal) 84'; Hickling (yellow card) 65'; Scott 90'; Walter 90+1'	Stadium: Newtown Park; Referee: Paul Rushworth

27 April 2025	Kapiti Coast United (9)	0–8	Wainuiomata (4)	Raumati Beach
14:00	Vine (yellow card) 42'	Report	Gribben 4'; McCaul 18', 30', 64', 75'; Imray 40'; Nicol 61'; Sharkey-Burns 82'	Stadium: Weka Park; Referee: Graham Strang

27 April 2025	Stop Out (3)	6–0	Te Kotahitanga (3)	Moera
14:00	Young 17'; Cunniff 27', 39' (pen.); Doran 40'; Axmed 89'; Street (yellow card) 89'	Report	Bly (red card) 90'	Stadium: Hutt Park; Referee: Barry Buchanan

Southern Region

22 April 2025	Grants Braes (4)	0–4	Green Island (3)	Dunedin North
19:00	Street (yellow card) 51'	Report	Hanrahan 5'; Waddell 43'; Prent 88'; Fairbairn 90'	Stadium: Logan Park; Referee: Wayne van Gorp

25 April 2025	Motueka (6)	1–6	Rangers (5)	Motueka
14:00	Searle (yellow card) 34'; Monaghan (yellow card) 49' (yellow-red card) 58'; Laquto 51'	Report	Masters 12', 83'; Elvy 29'; Mortimer 71', 85', 89'	Stadium: Memorial Park; Referee: Andrey Valenga Guimaraes

25 April 2025	Richmond (5)	1–2 (a.e.t.)	Wakefield (6)	Queenstown
14:00	Muir 56'	Report	Antúnez 75' (pen.); Hahn (yellow card) 77'; Johnson 95'	Stadium: Jubilee Park; Referee: Maurice John Llewellin

25 April 2025	Western (3)	2–1 (a.e.t.)	FC Twenty 11 (3)	Mairehau
14:00	Rusbridge (yellow card) 86'; Pitts 89'; Shimizu 117'	Report	Aldridge 67'; Birkett (yellow card) 120'	Stadium: Walter Park; Referee: Michael Field

25 April 2025	Parklands United (4)	1–6	Waimakariri United (3)	Parklands
14:00	Miller (yellow card) 11'; Torrance 34'; Gruschow (yellow card) 57'	Report	van der Meer 4'; Loney 12', 53', 74'; Harrison (yellow card) 41'; Cameron 43'; Elmohib 48'	Stadium: Parklands Reserve; Referee: Tom Lawson

25 April 2025	Burwood (3)	6–2	Halswell United (3)	Burwood
14:00	Magson 7'; Peters 15' (o.g.); Cox 37'; Biswa 43' (pen.); Livingstone 77'; Sikma 90'	Report	Peters (yellow card) 11'; Hughes 14'; Coughlan (yellow card) 42'; Rowe (red card) 55'; Ede (yellow card) 87'; Clarke 90+2'	Stadium: Clare Park; Referee: Simon Myers

26 April 2025	Central (5)	1–10	FC Nelson (5)	Richmond
14:00	Madumira 4'; Shallcrass (yellow card) 37'	Report	Baraili 10'; Vanuk 14' (pen.), 32', 90+3', 90+4'; Thompson 15', 58'; Lian 73'; Kearney 77'; King 80'	Stadium: A&P Showgrounds; Referee: Craig Smart

=== Round 1 ===
Matches were played over the of weekend of 9–12 May. This round contained one team from the Auckland Sunday football leagues — Internationale — which is the lowest-ranked team left in the competition.

Number of teams per tier still in competition
Tier 1+2	Tier 3	Tier 4	Tier 5, 6, 8, 9	Sunday League	Total
32 / 32	29 / 34	20 / 24	12 / 29	1 / 3	94 / 122

Northern Region

10 May 2025	Whakatane Town (5)	1–0	West Hamilton United (4)	Whakatāne
12:30		Report		Stadium: Rex Morpeth Park

10 May 2025	Ngongotaha (4)	2–4 (a.e.t.)	Waikato Unicol (5)	Ngongotahā
14:00		Report		Stadium: Tamarahi Reserve

10 May 2025	Melville United (3)	8–0	Matamata Swifts (4)	Hamilton Lake
14:00		Report		Stadium: Gower Park

10 May 2025	Mt Albert-Ponsonby (3)	1–4	Cambridge (3)	Mount Albert
14:00		Report		Stadium: Anderson Park

10 May 2025	Northern United (4)	2–0	Claudelands Rovers (4)	Rototuna North
14:00		Report		Stadium: Korikori Park
Note: Originally scheduled for 9 May at 19:00 but was postponed due to wet weather.

10 May 2025	Waiheke United (5)	5–1	West Auckland (6)	Waiheke Island
14:00		Report		Stadium: Onetangi Sports Complex

10 May 2025	Northland (4)	4–3	Papakura City (5)	Kensington
14:00		Report		Stadium: Trigg Arena

10 May 2025	Beachlands Maraetai (4)	1–4 (a.e.t.)	Hibiscus Coast (3)	Beachlands
14:00		Report		Stadium: Te Puru Park

10 May 2025	South Auckland Rangers (5)	1–5	Hamilton Wanderers (3)	Flat Bush
14:00		Report		Stadium: Rongomai Park

10 May 2025	Otumoetai (4)	6–2	Franklin United (4)	Matua
14:00		Report		Stadium: Fergusson Park

10 May 2025	Central United (4)	2–1	Te Atatu (5)	Sandringham
14:00		Report		Stadium: Kiwitea Street

10 May 2025	Bream Bay United (6)	0–6	Manukau United (3)	Ruakākā
14:00		Report		Stadium: Ruakākā Recreation Reserve

10 May 2025	Bucklands Beach (4)	6–1	Papamoa (4)	Bucklands Beach
14:00		Report		Stadium: Rogers Park

10 May 2025	Taupo (4)	3–0 (a.e.t.)	Metro (4)	Tauhara
14:00		Report		Stadium: Crown Park

10 May 2025	Waitemata (4)	3–5 (a.e.t.)	Ellerslie (3)	Te Atatū South
18:00		Report		Stadium: McLeod Park

11 May 2025	Internationale (SUN)	0–6	Takapuna (3)	Western Springs
15:00		Report		Stadium: Seddon Fields

Central Region

10 May 2025	Palmerston North United (3)	10–1	Western Rangers (4)	Terrace End
14:00		Report		Stadium: Memorial Park

10 May 2025	Stop Out (3)	9–0	Naenae (6)	Moera
14:00		Report		Stadium: Hutt Park

10 May 2025	Wellington Marist (4)	2–1	Tawa (3)	Kilbirnie
14:00		Report		Stadium: Kilbirnie Park

10 May 2025	Seatoun (3)	1–0	Wainuiomata (4)	Seatoun
14:00		Report		Stadium: Seatoun Park

10 May 2025	Palmerston North Marist (3)	2–0	Whanganui Athletic (4)	Palmerston North Central
14:30		Report		Stadium: Arena Manawatu Turf

10 May 2025	Douglas Villa (3)	2–3 (a.e.t.)	Victoria University (4)	Masterton
14:30		Report		Stadium: Memorial Drive

Southern Region

10 May 2025	Waimakariri United (3)	1–3	Coastal Spirit (1)	Kaiapoi
14:00		Report		Stadium: Kendall Park Turf

10 May 2025	Western (3)	0–3	Selwyn United (2)	Mairehau
14:00		Report		Stadium: Walter Park

10 May 2025	Northern Hearts (3)	3–2	Roslyn-Wakari (3)	Glenwood
14:00		Report		Stadium: Aorangi Park

10 May 2025	Green Island (3)	3–1	Old Boys' (3)	Green Island
14:30		Report		Stadium: Sunnyvale Park

10 May 2025	UC Football (2)	0–2	Ferrymead Bays (2)	St Albans
17:30		Report		Stadium: English Park

11 May 2025	Cashmere Technical (2)	2–0	Burwood (3)	Woolston
12:00		Report		Stadium: Garrick Memorial Park

11 May 2025	Nelson Suburbs (2)	6–0	FC Nelson (5)	Stoke
12:30		Report		Stadium: Saxton Fields

11 May 2025	Rangers (5)	7–1	Wakefield (6)	Redwoodtown
14:00		Report		Stadium: A&P Park

=== Round 2 ===
Matches were played over the King's Birthday weekend of 30 May – 2 June. This round contained four teams from tier 5; Waiheke United, Waikato Unicol, Whakatane Town, and Rangers (Blenheim), which are the lowest-ranked teams left in the competition.

Number of teams per tier still in competition
Tier 1+2	Tier 3	Tier 4	Tier 5, 6, 9	Sunday League	Total
31 / 32	21 / 34	8 / 24	4 / 29	0 / 3	64 / 122

Northern Region

31 May 2025	Ngaruawahia United (3)	0–5	Cambridge (3)	Ngāruawāhia
12:00		Report		Stadium: Centennial Park

31 May 2025	North Shore United (3)	0–1	Waiheke United (5)	Devonport
14:00		Report		Stadium: Allen Hill Stadium

31 May 2025	Manukau United (3)	2–1	Northern United (4)	Māngere East
14:00		Report		Stadium: Centre Park

31 May 2025	Ellerslie (3)	0–2	Northland (4)	Ellerslie
14:00		Report		Stadium: Michaels Avenue Reserve

31 May 2025	Onehunga Mangere United (3)	0–4	Auckland City (1)	Sandringham
14:00		Report		Stadium: Kiwitea Street
Note: Although the game was played at Kiwitea Street (Auckland City's home ground), Onehunga Mangere United were still considered the home side, as determined by the draw.

31 May 2025	Hamilton Wanderers (3)	3–2	Northern Rovers (3)	Chartwell
14:00		Report		Stadium: Porritt Stadium

31 May 2025	Hibiscus Coast (3)	5–0	Waikato Unicol (5)	Stanmore Bay
14:00		Report		Stadium: Stanmore Bay Park

2 June 2025	West Coast Rangers (2)	12–0	Whakatane Town (5)	Whenuapai
14:00		Report		Stadium: Fred Taylor Park

2 June 2025	Taupo (4)	0–5	Auckland United (1)	Tauhara
14:00		Report		Stadium: Crown Park

2 June 2025	Bucklands Beach (4)	0–5	Eastern Suburbs (2)	Bucklands Beach
14:00		Report		Stadium: Rogers Park

2 June 2025	Tauranga City (2)	5–1	Bay Olympic (2)	Mount Maunganui
14:00		Report		Stadium: Links Avenue

2 June 2025	Auckland FC Reserves (1)	1–1 (a.e.t.) (5–6 p)	Melville United (3)	Albany
14:00		Report		Stadium: North Harbour Stadium Turf

2 June 2025	East Coast Bays (2)	1–2	Western Springs (1)	Oteha
14:00		Report		Stadium: Bay City Park

2 June 2025	Central United (4)	1–4	Birkenhead United (1)	Sandringham
14:00		Report		Stadium: Kiwitea Street

2 June 2025	Otumoetai (4)	0–2	Manurewa (2)	Matua
14:00		Report		Stadium: Fergusson Park

2 June 2025	Fencibles United (2)	2–1 (a.e.t.)	Takapuna (3)	Pakuranga Heights
17:00		Report		Stadium: Riverhills Park

Central Region

31 May 2025	Victoria University (4)	1–2	Palmerston North United (3)	Kelburn
13:00		Report		Stadium: Boyd Wilson Turf

31 May 2025	Stop Out (3)	6–0	Seatoun (3)	Moera
14:00		Report		Stadium: Hutt Park

31 May 2025	Upper Hutt City (2)	1–2 (a.e.t.)	Western Suburbs (1)	Upper Hutt
14:00		Report		Stadium: Maidstone Park

31 May 2025	Wellington Marist (4)	0–8	Miramar Rangers (1)	Kilbirnie
14:00		Report		Stadium: Kilbirnie Park

31 May 2025	North Wellington (2)	0–7	Island Bay United (2)	Johnsonville
14:30		Report		Stadium: Alex Moore

31 May 2025	Petone (2)	0–3	Wellington Olympic (1)	Petone
15:00		Report		Stadium: Petone Memorial Park

31 May 2025	Palmerston North Marist (3)	0–4	Waterside Karori (2)	Palmerston North Central
17:00		Report		Stadium: Arena Manawatu Turf

1 June 2025	Napier City Rovers (2)	3–1	Wellington Phoenix Reserves (1)	Poraiti
14:00		Report		Stadium: Bluewater Stadium

Southern Region

30 May 2025	Ferrymead Bays (2)	4–1	Selwyn United (2)	Ferrymead
19:15	Butler 21'; Langley 53'; Rean 64'; Smith (yellow card) 75'; Stewart 90+7'	Report	Arnott 70'; Murfitt (yellow card) 90'	Stadium: Ferrymead Park; Referee: Richard Jones

31 May 2025	Christchurch United (1)	4–0	Nomads United (2)	Spreydon
14:00		Report		Stadium: United Sports Centre

31 May 2025	Green Island (3)	0–3	Wānaka (2)	Green Island
14:00		Report		Stadium: Sunnyvale Park

31 May 2025	Otago University (3)	2–1	Northern Hearts (3)	Dunedin North
15:00		Report		Stadium: Football Turf

31 May 2025	Dunedin City Royals (2)	5–1	Mosgiel (3)	Tainui
15:00		Report		Stadium: Tahuna Park

31 May 2025	Queens Park (3)	1–5	Northern (3)	Invercargill
15:00		Report		Stadium: ILT Football Turf

1 June 2025	Coastal Spirit (1)	1–4	Cashmere Technical (2)	Linwood
13:00	Hale (red card) 8'; de Groot-Green 10'; Hoole (yellow card) 43'; Anngow (yellow card) 52'	Report	Angus (yellow card) 20'; Matthysen 23' (pen.), 52' (pen.), 64', 82'; Caughey (yellow card) 71'; Amoafo (yellow card) 87'; Peacocke (yellow card) 90'	Stadium: Tāne Norton Park; Referee: Ben O'Connell

1 June 2025	Nelson Suburbs (2)	4–0	Rangers (5)	Stoke
14:00		Report		Stadium: Saxton Fields

=== Round 3 ===
Matches were played over the weekend of 13–15 June. This round contains one teams from tier 5; Waiheke United, which is the lowest-ranked team left in the competition.

Number of teams per tier still in competition
Tier 1+2	Tier 3	Tier 4	Tier 5, 6, 9	Sunday League	Total
21 / 32	9 / 34	1 / 24	1 / 29	0 / 3	32 / 122

Northern Region

14 June 2025	Northland (4)	0–3	Auckland United (1)	Kensington
14:00		Report		Stadium: Trigg Arena

14 June 2025	Eastern Suburbs (2)	5–2	Tauranga City (2)	Kohimarama
14:00		Report		Stadium: Madills Farm

14 June 2025	Auckland City (1)	1–2	Waiheke United (5)	Sandringham
14:00		Report		Stadium: Kiwitea Street

14 June 2025	Hamilton Wanderers (3)	1–2 (a.e.t.)	Manukau United (3)	Chartwell
15:00		Report		Stadium: Porritt Stadium

14 June 2025	Western Springs (1)	1–0 (a.e.t.)	Hibiscus Coast (3)	Western Springs
17:00		Report		Stadium: Seddon Fields

14 June 2025	Melville United (3)	1–0	Manurewa (2)	Hamilton Lake
17:00		Report		Stadium: Gower Park

14 June 2025	Fencibles United (2)	4–3 (a.e.t.)	Cambridge (3)	Pakuranga Heights
17:00		Report		Stadium: Riverhills Park

14 June 2025	Birkenhead United (1)	0–0 (a.e.t.) (4–2 p)	West Coast Rangers (2)	Beach Haven
18:00		Report		Stadium: Shepherds Park

Central Region

14 June 2025	Miramar Rangers (1)	0–3	Napier City Rovers (2)	Berhampore
14:00		Report		Stadium: Martin Luckie Park

14 June 2025	Waterside Karori (2)	0–3	Wellington Olympic (1)	Petone
14:00		Report		Stadium: Petone Memorial Park

14 June 2025	Island Bay United (2)	0–5	Western Suburbs (1)	Island Bay
14:30		Report		Stadium: Wakefield Park

15 June 2025	Palmerston North United (3)	3–1	Stop Out (3)	Terrace End
14:00		Report		Stadium: Memorial Park

Southern Region

13 June 2025	Christchurch United (1)	3–1	Cashmere Technical (2)	Russley
19:00	Henry 14'; Rogerson 21'; Godden 43' (yellow card) 76'; Prathumphithak (yellow card) 45+1'	Report	Matthysen 90+1'	Stadium: Christchurch Football Centre; Referee: Caleb Downes

14 June 2025	Otago University (3)	0–0 (a.e.t.) (2–3 p)	Wānaka (2)	Dunedin North
15:00		Report		Stadium: Football Turf

14 June 2025	Ferrymead Bays (2)	3–5 (a.e.t.)	Nelson Suburbs (2)	Ferrymead
16:00		Report		Stadium: Ferrymead Park

14 June 2025	Northern (3)	0–2 (a.e.t.)	Dunedin City Royals (2)	Dunedin North
19:00		Report		Stadium: Football Turf

=== Round 4 ===
Matches were played over the weekend of 4–6 July. This round contains one teams from tier 5; Waiheke United, which is the lowest-ranked team left in the competition.

Number of teams per tier still in competition
Tier 1+2	Tier 3	Tier 4	Tier 5, 6, 9	Sunday League	Total
12 / 32	3 / 34	0 / 24	1 / 29	0 / 3	16 / 122

Northern Region

4 July 2025	Fencibles United (2)	2–1	Western Springs (1)	Pakuranga Heights
19:00		Report		Stadium: Riverhills Park

5 July 2025	Manukau United (3)	1–3	Eastern Suburbs (2)	Māngere East
14:00		Report		Stadium: Walter Massey Park

5 July 2025	Auckland United (1)	7–1	Melville United (3)	Mount Roskill
14:00		Report		Stadium: Keith Hay Park

5 July 2025	Birkenhead United (1)	7–0	Waiheke United (5)	Beach Haven
17:00		Report		Stadium: Shepherds Park

Central Region

5 July 2025	Western Suburbs (1)	4–1	Palmerston North United (3)	Whitby
14:00		Report		Stadium: Endeavour Park

6 July 2025	Napier City Rovers (2)	2–3	Wellington Olympic (1)	Poraiti
14:00		Report		Stadium: Bluewater Stadium

Southern Region

5 July 2025	Wānaka (2)	0–3	Christchurch United (1)	Wānaka
13:00		Report		Stadium: Wanaka Recreation Centre

5 July 2025	Dunedin City Royals (2)	0–1	Nelson Suburbs (2)	Tahuna
13:00		Report		Stadium: Tāhuna Park

=== Quarter-finals ===
Matches will be played over the weekend of 26–27 July.

Number of teams per tier still in competition
Tier 1+2	Tier 3	Tier 4	Tier 5, 6, 9	Sunday League	Total
8 / 32	0 / 34	0 / 24	0 / 29	0 / 3	8 / 122

26 July 2025	Western Suburbs (1)	2–3 (a.e.t.)	Wellington Olympic (1)	Whitby
14:00	Freeman 82'; Miller (yellow card) 90'; Diamond 90+3'; Wildash-Chan (yellow card) 90+6'; Hunt (yellow card) 102'	Report	Hoy 45+3'; Bouzoukis 76'; Manuel (yellow card) 78'; Davies 110'	Stadium: Endeavour Park; Referee: Caleb Downes

26 July 2025	Christchurch United (1)	2–4 (a.e.t.)	Auckland United (1)	Russley
15:00	Rogerson 9'; Tollervey 53'; Graham (yellow card) 90+7'; Tasip (yellow card) 90+8'	Report	Atkinson (yellow card) 27'; Conroy 82'; Vollenhoven (yellow card) 83'; Tade 88', 97'; Curry (yellow card) 90+2'; Takahashi (yellow card) 90+2'; Singh (yellow card) 90+3' (goal) 107'	Stadium: Christchurch Football Centre; Referee: Calvin-kei Berg

26 July 2025	Fencibles United (2)	0–2	Eastern Suburbs (2)	Pakuranga
18:00	Grubjesic (yellow card) 41'	Report	Dalziell (yellow card) 27'; Echagüe 63'; Dunn 90+3'; Irwin (yellow card) 90+4'	Stadium: Riverhills Park; Referee: James Berry

27 July 2025	Nelson Suburbs (2)	2–1 (a.e.t.)	Birkenhead United (1)	Stoke
11:45	Whewell 60'; Vickers (yellow card) 81'; Myers 99'; Riley (yellow card) 105'	Report	Khan (yellow card) 32'; Suski 55'	Stadium: Saxton Fields; Referee: Ralph Clink

=== Semi-finals ===
Matches will be played over the weekend of 16–17 August.

Number of teams per tier still in competition
Tier 1+2	Tier 3	Tier 4	Tier 5, 6, 9	Sunday League	Total
4 / 32	0 / 34	0 / 24	0 / 29	0 / 3	4 / 122

16 August 2025	Auckland United (1)	3–0	Nelson Suburbs (2)	Mount Roskill
14:00	Olaoye 5'; Conroy 43'; Tade 45+3'	Report	Carter (yellow card) 76'	Stadium: Keith Hay Park; Referee: Ashley Wilson

16 August 2025	Eastern Suburbs (2)	1–1 (a.e.t.) (3–4 p)	Wellington Olympic (1)	Kohimarama
14:00	Mechell 30'	Report	Prins 48' (pen.); Supyk (yellow card) 68'; Reynolds (yellow card) 106'	Stadium: Madills Farm; Referee: Campbell-Kirk Kawana-Waugh
	Penalties
	Echagüe (penalty scored); Irwin (penalty scored); Jarvie (penalty missed); Ramirez (penalty scored); Karunaratne (penalty missed)		(penalty missed) Reynolds; (penalty scored) Supyk; (penalty scored) Hoy; (penalty scored) Davenport Petersen; (penalty scored) Bouzoukis

=== Final ===
7 September 2025
13:00

Auckland United	2–4	Wellington Olympic
Vollenhoven 17'; Curry 73'	Report	Watson 4', 68'; Prins 34'; Sinclair 59'

North Harbour Stadium, Albany
Referee: Cory Mills

== Notes ==
The tiers that teams are in (as indicated in brackets next to their name) are based on the New Zealand football league system for the 2025 season. As some teams can qualify and play in more than one league (and tier) per season, the highest tier that they took part in is the one noted next to their name.
