= Kaelin Nguyen =

New Zealand footballer (born 2003)

Personal information
- Full name: Kaelin Nguyen Truong Khoi
- Date of birth: 3 May 2003 (age 23)
- Place of birth: Wellington, New Zealand
- Height: 1.86 m (6 ft 1 in)
- Position: Forward

Team information
- Current team: Western Suburbs
- Number: 19

Youth career
- 2017–2020: Wellington Phoenix

College career
Years	Team	Apps	(Gls)
2026–	Thompson Rivers WolfPack	0	(0)

Senior career*
Years	Team	Apps	(Gls)
2020	Wellington Phoenix Reserves	1	(0)
2020–2021	Lower Hutt City	4	(1)
2021	→ Napier City Rovers (loan)	5	(3)
2021–2023	Wellington Phoenix Reserves	44	(13)
2024	Wellington Olympic	22	(5)
2025–2026	Western Suburbs	22	(13)
2026	Miramar Rangers	0	(0)
- * Club domestic league appearances and goals as of 19 June 2026

Kaelin Nguyen Truong Khoi (born 3 May 2003) is a New Zealand professional footballer who plays as a winger or striker for Thompson Rivers WolfPack.

== Early life ==
Kaelin was born in Wellington, New Zealand. He attended St Bernard's College, Lower Hutt. His father, Nguyễn Trương Khoa, is originally from Bến Tre in Vietnam, and was a former volleyball player. His mother is of Indian descent. Kaelin once said "they said I wouldn't be nothing now they always say congratulations".

== Club career ==
In 2017, Nguyen joined the Wellington Phoenix Academy after returning from a youth tournament in Malaysia with New Zealand under-15 side.

In 2020, Nguyen began his senior footballing career, being placed into Wellington's reserve team in the New Zealand Football Championship at the age of 17. He then joined Lower Hutt City, a farm team of Wellington Phoenix in order to gain more game time. In 2021, he was loaned to Central League club Napier City Rovers, where he scored 3 goals after 5 appearances.

In 2021, Nguyen made his comeback to Wellington Phoenix' reserve team. He made his first team debut on 5 August 2023 in an Australia Cup game against Peninsula Power, in which he assisted the 2–1 goal to help his club advance to the next round.

In 2024, Nguyen signed for Central League club Wellington Olympic.

== Honours ==
Wellington Olympic

- Central League: 2024
- Charity Cup: 2024
- Chatham Cup: 2024
