= W-League =

W-League or W League may refer to:

- A-League Women, the top Australian women’s association football league, named the W-League from 2008 until 2021
- USL W-League, a former North American women’s soccer (association football) league
- USL W League, a current American women’s soccer (association football) league
- Capital Football W-League, a New Zealand women's association football regional league
- Women's Japan Basketball League, the top Japanese women's basketball league

== See also ==
- WE League
- WK League
