= Wellington Olympic AFC =

Wellington Olympic
- Full name: Wellington Olympic Association Football Club
- Nickname: The Greeks
- Founded: 1953; 73 years ago (as Apollon AFC)
- Ground: Wakefield Park
- Capacity: 1,000
- Chairman: Paul Kotrotsos
- Manager: Ekow Quainoo
- League: National League
- 2026: Central League, 2nd of 10; National League, TBD
- Website: www.olympicafc.org.nz
Home colours	Away colours

Wellington Olympic Association Football Club is a New Zealand association football club based in Berhampore, Wellington. The club's premier team competes in the National League.

== Club history ==
Olympic playing a friendly match vs. the Wellington Phoenix in 2026.

The club was formed in 1953 by Greek immigrants as Apollon AFC and is commonly known as 'The Greeks'. The club changed its name to Christian Youth FC (CYFC) in 1959, and became Wellington Olympic in 1983. The local Greek community continues to be the basis of the club's support and a significant number of players are of Greek heritage.

The club has thrived in the 2020s, winning five Central League (New Zealand) titles in a row from 2021 to 2025, two Chatham Cup titles in 2024 and 2025 and one New Zealand National League title in 2023. It also reached National League finals in 2022 and 2025.

== 2024 squad ==
Note: Flags indicate national team as defined under FIFA eligibility rules; some limited exceptions apply. Players may hold more than one non-FIFA nationality.

No.	Pos.	Nation	Player
1	GK	NZL	Scott Basalaj
2	DF	FIJ	Gabrieli Matanisiga
3	DF	NZL	Adam Supyk
4	DF	NZL	Dylan Wood
5	DF	NZL	Justin Gulley (vice-captain)
6	MF	NZL	Tor Davenport-Petersen
7	MF	USA	Johnny Reynolds
8	FW	NZL	Eddie Wilkinson
9	FW	NZL	Hamish Watson
10	FW	NZL	Oliver Colloty
11	FW	ENG	Kailan Gould
12	GK	NZL	Christopher Kotrotsos
13	MF	NZL	William Vincent
14	FW	NZL	Jack-Henry Sinclair
15	DF	COK	Ben Mata (captain)

No.	Pos.	Nation	Player
16	MF	NZL	Joshua Apaapa-Preston
17	FW	NZL	Devon Thurston
18	DF	NZL	Luke Tongue
19	MF	NZL	Samuel Mitrakas
20	DF	NZL	Tamupiwa Dimairo
21	MF	NZL	Isa Prins
22	MF	NZL	Lukas Halikias
23	MF	CAN	Gavin Hoy
24	FW	NZL	Jonty Roubos
25	MF	IRL	Joel Coustrain
26	FW	NZL	Oliver Davies
27	FW	NZL	Kaelin Nguyen
28	FW	NZL	Joshua Rudland
41	GK	NZL	Alex Britton
42	GK	NZL	Matthew King

== 2024 staff ==
- Head coach: Paul Ifill
- Assistant coaches: Ekow Quainoo, Taylor-Hall Jones

== Season by season record ==
2021– (National League)

Season	Central League									National League									OFC Champions League	Chatham Cup	Top scorer	
Season	P	W	D	L	F	A	GD	Pts	Pos	P	W	D	L	F	A	GD	Pts	Pos	OFC Champions League	Chatham Cup	Name	Goals
2021	18	15	2	1	59	18	+41	47	1st	5	3	1	1	15	13	+2	5	2nd	DNQ	R3	(New Zealand) Gianni Bouzoukis}}	16
2022	18	14	3	1	71	15	+56	45	1st	9	7	1	1	30	8	+22	22	2nd	DNQ	SF	(New Zealand) Gianni Bouzoukis	25
2023	18	15	1	2	79	29	+50	46	1st	9	7	2	0	34	15	+19	23	1st	DNQ	QF	(New Zealand) Jack-Henry Sinclair	20
2024	18	17	0	1	79	16	+63	51	1st	9	3	2	4	17	15	+2	11	6th	PO	W	(New Zealand) Hamish Watson	18
2025	18	14	3	1	57	13	+44	45	1st	10	7	0	3	23	14	+9	21	2nd	PO	W	(New Zealand) Isa Prins	16
2026	18	13	3	2	53	17	+36	39	3rd	Qualified									DNQ	R2	(New Zealand) Luke Stoupe	10

== Performance in OFC competitions ==
Season	Competition	Round	Club	Home	Away	Aggregate
2023	OFC Champions League	National PO	(New Zealand) Auckland City	1–1	3–5	4–6
2024	OFC Champions League	National PO	(New Zealand) Auckland City	3–3	0–1	3–4

== Honours ==
=== National ===
- New Zealand National Football League

Winners (1): 2023

- ASB Charity Cup

Winners (1): 2024

- Chatham Cup

Winners (3): 2009, 2024, 2025

=== Regional ===
- Central League

Winners (7): 2010, 2016, 2021, 2022, 2023, 2024, 2025

Season(s)	Achievement
1970	Joined the Central Region League (Division Two)
1991	Central Region League (Division One) winners
1994	Chatham Cup runners-up
1994	National U19s Youth Championships winners
1995	SuperClub Plate winners
2009	Chatham Cup winners
2010	Central League winners
2016	Central League winners
2021	Central League winners
2022	Central League winners
2023	New Zealand National League winners
2023	Central League winners
2024	Chatham Cup winners
2024	Charity Cup winners
2024	Central League winners
2025	Central League winners
2025	Chatham Cup winners

== League records ==
Most appearances

- Harry Kotsapas, 377 games, 1973–1993
- Nick Halikias, 354 games, 1975–1993
- Alkis Ioannou, 260 games, 1975–1992
- Chris Christie, 252 games, 1977–2002
- Spiros Androutsos, 231 games, 1972–1995

Most goals in a season

- Geoff Brown, 35 goals, 2004

Most goals overall

- Harry Kotsapas, 132 goals, 1973–1993
- Chris Christie, 98 goals, 1977–2002
- Imre Foldi, 87 goals, 1990–1999
- Spiros Androutsos, 84 goals, 1972–1995
- Jimmy Haidakis, 83 goals, 2003-2009

== Notable players ==
- (New Zealand) Leo Bertos
- (New Zealand) Kosta Barbarouses
- (New Zealand) Simon Elliott
- (New Zealand) Raf de Gregorio
- (New Zealand) Stu Jacobs
- (New Zealand) Clayton Lewis

Chatham Cup
Preceded by East Coast Bays	Winner; 2009 Chatham Cup	Succeeded by Miramar Rangers
Preceded by Christchurch United	Winner; 2024 Chatham Cup	Succeeded by Wellington Olympic
Preceded by Wellington Olympic	Winner; 2025 Chatham Cup	Succeeded by to be played
