= Women's Central League (New Zealand) =

New Zealand Women's Central League
- Founded: 1994
- Country: New Zealand
- Regions: Wellington, Hawke's Bay, Manawatū-Whanganui, Taranaki
- Number of clubs: 10
- Level on pyramid: 2
- Promotion to: New Zealand Women's National League
- Relegation to: Capital Football Women's Premiership or Central Football Regional Women's Championships
- Domestic cup: Kate Sheppard Cup
- Current champions: Wellington United (2025)
- Most championships: Wellington United (7 titles)
- Website: 2025 Women's Central League

The New Zealand Women's Central League (WCL) is an association football league competition administered by Capital Football for women's club teams located in the Wellington, Hawke's Bay, Manawatū-Whanganui, Taranaki and Gisborne–Tairāwhiti regions of the North Island, New Zealand.

New Zealand Regional National Women's League Zones

The WCL is within the second level of New Zealand Football, below New Zealand Women's National League, and is the highest level of club based football available to teams within the Wellington Region and Central Districts of the lower North Island of New Zealand.

Clubs are promoted to the WCL via seasonal playoff through qualification from the Capital Football Women's Premier League or the Central Football Women's Regional Federation League.

== League history ==
The Women's Central League was launched in 1994.

The league went into recess from 1999 until 2003, recommencing in 2004.

Petone won the first five WCL titles in succession, from 1994 to 1998.

Wellington United won four successive WCL titles, from 2018 to 2021.

In 2024 the Women's Central League was expanded to include 10 clubs.

== 2025 W.C.L.|Club Locations ==
Location of clubs in North Island for the 2025 New Zealand Women's Central League season
Location of Clubs in Wellington Region for the 2025 Women's Central League season

== 2025 W.C.L.|Home Grounds ==
Club	Location	Home Ground(s)
Miramar Rangers AFC	Miramar	David Farrington Park
Moturoa AFC	New Plymouth	Onuku Taipari Domain
Palmerston North Marist FC	Palmerston North	Arena Manawatū
Palmerston North United FC	Palmerston North	Memorial Park
Petone FC	Petone	Memorial Park
Taradale AFC	Taradale	Taradale Park
Victoria University AFC	Kelburn	Boyd Wilson Turf
Waterside Karori AFC	Karori	Karori Park
Wellington United AFC	Newtown	Newtown Park
Wellington Phoenix - U18 Girls Academy	Lower Hutt	Fraser Park Turf

== WCL records ==
=== Past Champions ===
- 1994 – Petone
- 1995 – Petone
- 1996 – Petone
- 1997 – Petone
- 1998 – Petone
- 1999 – 2003 League In Recess
- 2004 – Massey University
- 2005 – Wellington Marist
- 2006 – Seatoun
- 2007 – Seatoun
- 2008 – Seatoun
- 2009 – Wellington Marist
- 2010 – Wellington Marist
- 2011 – Waterside Karori
- 2012 – Massey University
- 2013 – Massey University
- 2014 – Massey University
- 2015 – Seatoun
- 2016 – Wellington United
- 2017 – Upper Hutt City
- 2018 – Wellington United
- 2019 – Wellington United
- 2020 – Wellington United
- 2021 – Wellington United
- 2022 – Waterside Karori
- 2023 – Waterside Karori
- 2024 – Wellington United
- 2025 – Wellington United

=== WCL Top Scorer ===
Goals/Player	Season	Club
35 goals ⚽️ Natalie Olson	2025	Wellington United
12 goals ⚽️ Nikki Furukawa	2024	Waterside Karori
17 goals ⚽️ Mikaela Boxall	2023	Palmerston North Marist
15 goals ⚽️ Renee Bacon	2022	Waterside Karori
18 goals ⚽️ Torijan Lyne-Lewis	2021	Wairarapa United
26 goals ⚽️ Jemma Robertson	2020	Wellington United
15 goals ⚽️ Kaley Ward	2019	Waterside Karori
13 goals ⚽️ Dani Ohlsson	2018	Wellington United
24 goals ⚽️ Sarah Gregorius	2017	Upper Hutt City
22 goals ⚽️ Michaela Robertson	2016	Wellington United
38 goals ⚽️ Jane Barnett	2015	Massey University

2026

Moturoa withdrew from the competition before the 2026 season commenced, with Victoria University reinstated to the league.

=== 2025 ===
Seatoun were promoted to the 2026 Women's Central League as 2025 Women's Capital Premier champions. Seatoun won the 2025 qualifier against Manawatū Women's Championship winner, New Plymouth Rangers. Victoria University were relegated to the 2026 Women's Capital Premier.

=== 2024 ===
Miramar Rangers were promoted to the expanded 2025 Women's Central League with Manawatū club, Palmerston North United after the 2024 league qualification series. Seatoun were relegated to the 2025 Women's Capital Premier.

=== 2023 ===
Moturoa returned to the 2023 WCL, last playing the 2016 season. Moturoa were promoted to the 2024 Women's Central League after winning the 2023 Women's Central Federation League and Central/Capital promotion playoff against Capital qualifier, Horowhenua Coastal (Te Kotahitanga FC), at the expense of relegated club North Wellington.

=== 2022 ===
Taradale were promoted to the 2023 Central Region Premier W-League as 2022 Central Federation Premier Women's League champions increasing the league participants to include eight teams. The 2023 Women's Central League was won by Waterside Karori for the second year in succession.
