= Héctor Echagüe =

Argentine footballer (born 1988)

Personal information
- Full name: Héctor Eduardo Echagüe
- Date of birth: 24 January 1988 (age 38)
- Place of birth: Corrientes, Argentina
- Height: 1.80 m (5 ft 11 in)
- Position: Midfielder

Team information
- Current team: Eastern Suburbs
- Number: 8

Senior career*
| Years | Team | Apps | (Gls) |
| 2009–2010 | Independiente | 2 | (0) |
| 2010–2011 | Textil Mandiyú | 12 | (0) |
| 2012 | 9 de Julio | 0 | (0) |
| 2012 | Güemes | 7 | (1) |
| 2013–2017 | Defensores de Pronunciamiento | 92 | (25) |
| 2017–2019 | Defensores Unidos | 74 | (3) |
| 2019–2024 | Defensores de Pronunciamiento | 16 | (1) |
| 2024 | Manurewa | | |
| 2025– | Eastern Suburbs | | |
- * Club domestic league appearances and goals as of 16:41, 2 September 2020 (UTC)

Héctor Eduardo Echagüe (born 24 January 1988) is an Argentine professional footballer who plays as a midfielder for Eastern Suburbs.

== Career ==
Echagüe began his career with Primera División side Independiente. He made his senior debut on 20 June 2009 during a fixture with San Lorenzo, coming off the substitutes bench in place of Roberto Vissio with twenty-four minutes remaining. His first start arrived days later against Arsenal de Sarandí, which was his final appearance for the club. Echagüe departed to Torneo Argentino B's Textil Mandiyú in 2010, going on to play twelve times. Echagüe had a five-day stint with 9 de Julio in January 2012. Further moves to Güemes and Defensores de Pronunciamiento came, along with twenty-six goals.

On 14 August 2017, Echagüe joined Defensores Unidos of Primera C Metropolitana. After promotion in his first season, a late cameo in a 1–0 loss away to UAI Urquiza on 19 August saw the midfielder make his bow in Primera B Metropolitana; with his first goal coming in the succeeding September versus Almirante Brown. He departed Defensores at the end that season, prior to securing a return to Defensores de Pronunciamiento in July 2019.

== Career statistics ==
As of 2 September 2020.

Appearances and goals by club, season and competition
| Club | Season | League | | | Cup | | League Cup | | Continental | | Other | | Total | |
| Club | Season | Division | Apps | Goals | Apps | Goals | Apps | Goals | Apps | Goals | Apps | Goals | Apps | Goals |
|---|---|---|---|---|---|---|---|---|---|---|---|---|---|---|
| Independiente | 2009–10 | Primera División | 2 | 0 | 0 | 0 | — | | — | | 0 | 0 | 2 | 0 |
| Textil Mandiyú | 2010–11 | Torneo Argentino B | 12 | 0 | 0 | 0 | — | | — | | 0 | 0 | 12 | 0 |
| Textil Mandiyú | 2011–12 | Torneo Argentino B | 0 | 0 | 0 | 0 | — | | — | | 0 | 0 | 0 | 0 |
| Textil Mandiyú | Total | | 12 | 0 | 0 | 0 | — | | — | | 0 | 0 | 12 | 0 |
| 9 de Julio | 2011–12 | Torneo Argentino B | 0 | 0 | 0 | 0 | — | | — | | 0 | 0 | 0 | 0 |
| Güemes | 2012–13 | Torneo Argentino B | 7 | 1 | 0 | 0 | — | | — | | 0 | 0 | 7 | 1 |
| Defensores de Pronunciamiento | 2016 | Torneo Federal A | 11 | 5 | 2 | 0 | — | | — | | 0 | 0 | 13 | 5 |
| Defensores de Pronunciamiento | 2016–17 | Torneo Federal A | 25 | 3 | 0 | 0 | — | | — | | 0 | 0 | 25 | 3 |
| Defensores de Pronunciamiento | Total | | 36 | 8 | 2 | 0 | — | | — | | 0 | 0 | 38 | 8 |
| Defensores Unidos | 2017–18 | Primera C Metropolitana | 37 | 2 | 0 | 0 | — | | — | | 0 | 0 | 37 | 2 |
| Defensores Unidos | 2018–19 | Primera B Metropolitana | 37 | 1 | 2 | 0 | — | | — | | 0 | 0 | 39 | 1 |
| Defensores Unidos | Total | | 74 | 3 | 2 | 0 | — | | — | | 0 | 0 | 76 | 3 |
| Defensores de Pronunciamiento | 2019–20 | Torneo Federal A | 16 | 1 | 1 | 0 | — | | — | | 0 | 0 | 17 | 1 |
| Career total | | | 147 | 13 | 5 | 0 | — | | — | | 0 | 0 | 152 | 13 |

== Honours ==
Defensores de Pronunciamiento

- Torneo Federal B: 2015

Defensores Unidos

- Primera C Metropolitana: 2017–18
