= Benjamin Mata =

Cook Islands association football player

Personal information
- Full name: Benjamin Leonardo Mata
- Date of birth: 10 August 1998 (age 28)
- Place of birth: Auckland, New Zealand
- Height: 1.85 m (6 ft 1 in)
- Position: Defender

Team information
- Current team: Wellington Olympic
- Number: 15

Youth career
- –2015: Wanderers SC

College career
Years	Team	Apps	(Gls)
2017–2018	Missouri State Bears	0	(0)

Senior career*
Years	Team	Apps	(Gls)
2015–2016	Onehunga Sports		
2016–2017	Wellington Phoenix Reserves	12	(0)
2018	Papakura City		
2019	Tupapa Maraerenga	0	(0)
2019–2021	Team Wellington	12	(0)
2021–	Wellington Olympic	119	(44)

International career^{‡}
2015–2017	New Zealand U17	6	(2)
2022–	Cook Islands	2	(2)
- * Club domestic league appearances and goals as of 25 April 2026 ‡ National team caps and goals as of 12:00, 1 October 2026 (UTC)

Benjamin Mata (born 10 August 1998) is a footballer who plays as a central defender for New Zealand National League club Wellington Olympic, which he captains. Born in New Zealand, he plays for the Cook Islands national team.

== Club career ==
Mata began his youth career with Wanderers SC. After his departure from the club he joined Onehunga Sports. The following season he was signed to the reserve side of Wellington Phoenix of the A-League. He was one of two players to receive the Winston Reid Scholarship to join the club.

In 2017 he committed to play college soccer in the United States for the Bears of Missouri State University. However, he did not go on to appear for the team.

In 2018 Mata joined Papakura City for one season. In 2019 he joined Tupapa Maraerenga of the Cook Islands Round Cup. He made two appearances for the club in 2019 OFC Champions League qualification, scoring three goals.

Later in 2019 he moved to Team Wellington. He remained with the club until 2021 when he signed across town with Wellington Olympic. During his first season with Olympic, Mata helped the team win the Central League title that season. After the move to Olympic he was named captain of the squad.

== International career ==
Born in New Zealand, Mata represented the country at the youth level. He made his debut for them at the 2015 OFC U-17 Championship. After qualifying as champions of the 2017 OFC U-17 Championship, he was then part of the squad that advanced to the round of 16 in the 2017 FIFA U-17 World Cup. He captained the side in the team's round of 16 loss to Brazil.

In March 2022 it was confirmed that Mata had committed to representing the Cook Islands internationally and had been included in the nation’s squad for 2022 FIFA World Cup qualification. He went on to make his senior international debut on 17 March 2022 in the opening match against the Solomon Islands. He served as captain of the squad in his first-ever appearance.

== Personal life ==
Mata was born in Auckland, New Zealand. His younger brother, Max, is also a footballer.

== Career statistics ==
=== Club ===
As of match played 25 April 2026

Appearances and goals by club, season and competition
Club	Season	League			National cup		Continental		Other		Total	
Club	Season	Division	Apps	Goals	Apps	Goals	Apps	Goals	Apps	Goals	Apps	Goals
Wellington Phoenix Reserves	2016–17	Premiership	12	0	—		—		—		12	0
Tupapa Maraerenga	2019	Round Cup	0	0	0	0	2 (Note: Appearances in OFC Champions League)	3	—		2	3
Team Wellington	2019–20	Premiership	1	0	—		—		—		1	0
Team Wellington	2020–21	Premiership	11	0	—		—		—		11	0
Team Wellington	Total		12	0	0	0	0	0	0	0	12	0
Wellington Olympic	2021	National League	21	9	2	2	—		5 (Note: Appearances in South Central Series)	4	28	15
Wellington Olympic	2022	National League	24	7	6	0	—		—		30	7
Wellington Olympic	2023	National League	23	14	3	6	2	1	—		28	21
Wellington Olympic	2024	National League	25	11	6	5	1	0	1 (Note: Appearances in Charity Cup)	1	33	17
Wellington Olympic	2025	National League	21	2	3	1	—		—		24	3
Wellington Olympic	2026	National League	5	1	0	0	—		—		5	1
Wellington Olympic	Total		119	44	20	14	3	1	6	5	148	64
Career total			143	44	20	14	5	4	6	5	174	67

=== International goals ===
Scores and results list the Cook Islands' goal tally first.

No.	Cap	Date	Venue	Opponent	Score	Result	Competition
1.	2	29 September 2026	CIFA Academy Field, Matavera, Cook Islands	Tahiti	1–0	3–2	Friendly
2.	2	29 September 2026	CIFA Academy Field, Matavera, Cook Islands	Tahiti	3–2	3–2	Friendly
Last updated 1 October 2026

=== International ===
As of match played 1 October 2026

Cook Islands
Year	Apps	Goals
2022	1	0
2026	1	2
Total	2	2

== Honours ==
Team Wellington

- New Zealand Football Championship: 2020–21
