= Martin Luckie Park =

Sports venue in Wellington, New Zealand

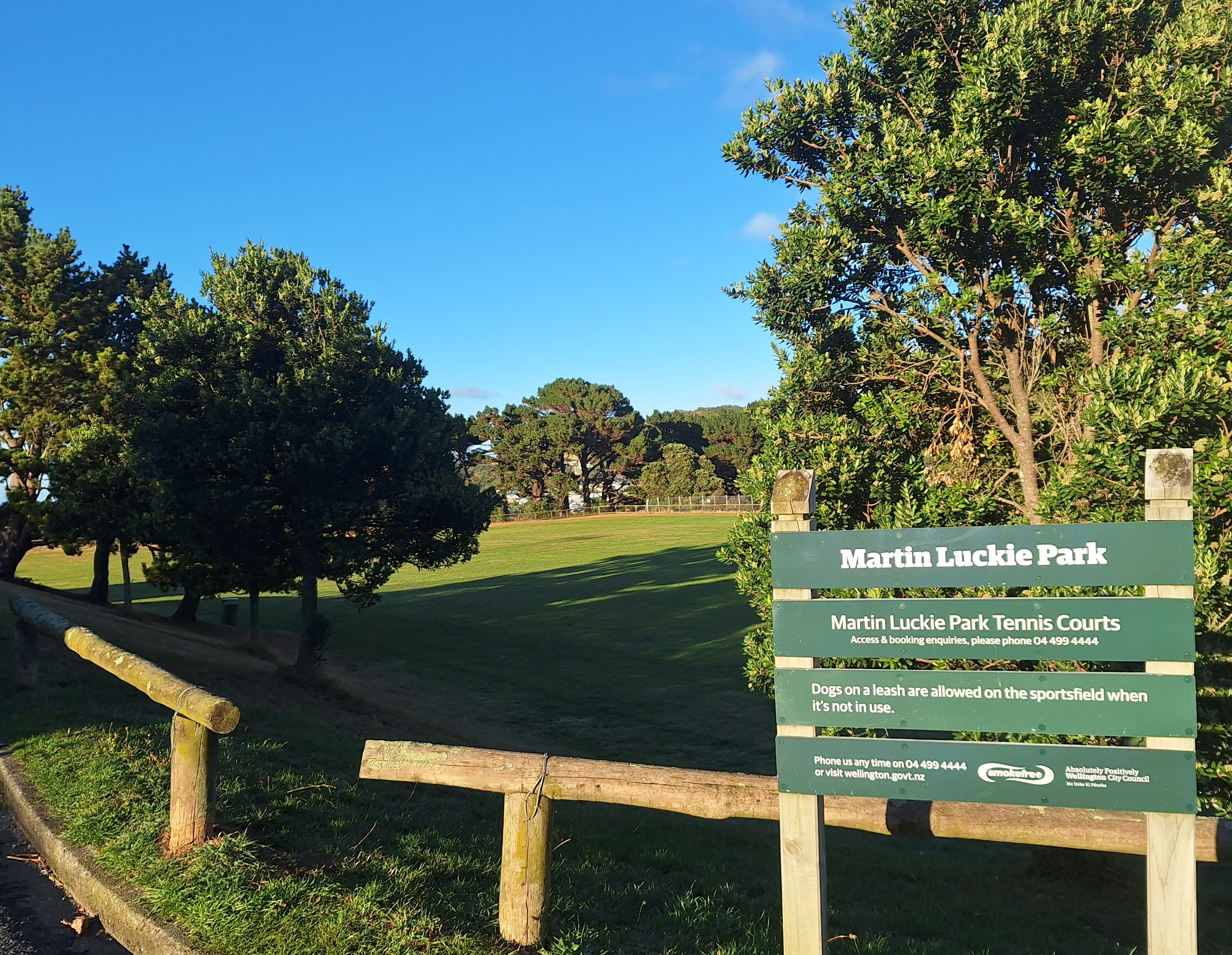
- Interactive map of Martin Luckie Park
- Location: Lavaud Street, Berhampore, Wellington, New Zealand
- Coordinates: 41.324637°S 174.779029°E
- Owner: Wellington City Council
- Operator: Wellington City Council
- Capacity: 1,000
- Surface: Grass Pitch

Construction
- Renovated: 2017
- Cost: NZD$550,000 (2017)

Tenant
- Wellington Olympic (occasional)

Website
- Wellington City Council

Martin Luckie Park, is a multi-purpose stadium in the suburb of Berhampore in Wellington, New Zealand. It is used for football matches and is the occasional home stadium of Wellington Olympic including OFC Champions League games. The fields have also been used for volleyball, ultimate frisbee and touch rugby. Martin Luckie has also hosted other events such as the Wellington Fringe Festival.

The stadium is named after Martin Luckie.

== History ==
Fletcher Construction completed construction of a pavilion in 1956. In 2017, Martin Luckie Park received two new sand-based pitches to an "elite-training level". Wellington City Council provided $550,000 for the upgrades, with Wellington Phoenix also providing money for the upgrades. There were some concerns as the public were fearful of losing access to the ground should it be upgraded for the Phoenix, as well as the predicted yearly maintenance costs being $180,000.

In September 2023 FIFA announced that Martin Luckie Park would be a venue-specific training site for the 2023 FIFA Women's World Cup. $1,900,000 was spent on three Wellington venues for World Cup upgrades, including Martin Luckie Park. As part of the upgrades for the World Cup, Martin Luckie received new floodlights, upgraded changing rooms and field upgraded to FIFA standards.
