= Gavin Hoy =

Canadian soccer player (born 1992)

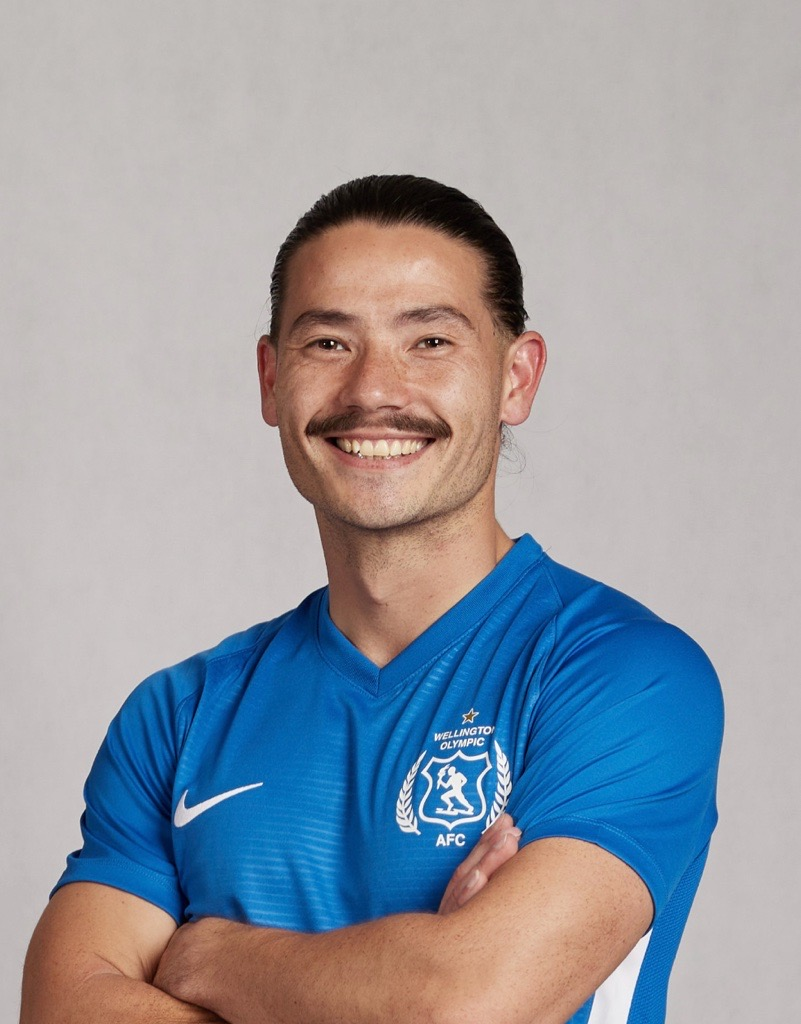

Personal information
- Full name: Gavin Michael Van Bendegem-Hoy
- Date of birth: 7 September 1992 (age 34)
- Place of birth: Canada
- Height: 1.72 m (5 ft 8 in)
- Position: Midfielder

Team information
- Current team: Wellington Olympic
- Number: 23

College career
| Years | Team | Apps | (Gls) |
| 2011–2014 | Oakland Golden Grizzlies | | |

Senior career*
| Years | Team | Apps | (Gls) |
| 2008 | Thunder Bay Chill | 1 | (0) |
| 2011–2013 | Thunder Bay Chill | 23 | (2) |
| 2016–2017 | Olympia Warriors | | |
| 2017–2021 | Hawke's Bay United | 49 | (6) |
| 2022 | North Wellington | 15 | (5) |
| 2023– | Wellington Olympic | 36 | (12) |
- * Club domestic league appearances and goals

Gavin Michael Van Bendegem-Hoy (born 7 September 1992) is a Canadian soccer player who plays as a midfielder for Wellington Olympic.

== Early life ==
Hoy started his career with Canadian side Thunder Bay Chill at the age of sixteen. He started playing piano as a high school student.

== Career ==
In 2016, Hoy signed for Australian side Olympia Warriors. In 2017, he signed for New Zealand side Hawke's Bay United. In 2022, he signed for New Zealand side North Wellington. In 2023, he signed for New Zealand side Wellington Olympic. He has won the Chatham Cup.

== Style of play ==
Hoy mainly operates as a midfielder. He has operated as a "pocket forward" while playing for New Zealand side Hawke's Bay United.

== Personal life ==
Hoy was born in 1992 in Canada. He has worked in the information technology industry.

== Career statistics ==
As of match played 13 December 2025

| Club | Season | League | | | National Cup | | Continental | | Other | | Total | |
| Club | Season | Division | Apps | Goals | Apps | Goals | Apps | Goals | Apps | Goals | Apps | Goals |
|---|---|---|---|---|---|---|---|---|---|---|---|---|
| Hawke's Bay United | 2017–18 | Premiership | 15 | 3 | — | | — | | — | | 15 | 3 |
| Hawke's Bay United | 2018–19 | Premiership | 8 | 1 | — | | — | | — | | 8 | 1 |
| Hawke's Bay United | 2019–20 | Premiership | 15 | 2 | — | | — | | — | | 15 | 2 |
| Hawke's Bay United | 2020–21 | Premiership | 13 | 2 | — | | — | | — | | 13 | 2 |
| Hawke's Bay United | Total | | 51 | 8 | 0 | 0 | 0 | 0 | 0 | 0 | 51 | 8 |
| North Wellington | 2021 | National League | 18 | 8 | 1 | 0 | — | | — | | 19 | 8 |
| North Wellington | 2022 | National League | 15 | 5 | 1 | 0 | — | | — | | 16 | 5 |
| North Wellington | Total | | 33 | 13 | 2 | 0 | 0 | 0 | 0 | 0 | 35 | 13 |
| Wellington Olympic | 2023 | National League | 26 | 11 | 2 | 0 | 2 (Note: Appearances in OFC Champions League.) | 0 | — | | 30 | 11 |
| Wellington Olympic | 2024 | National League | 24 | 3 | 6 | 0 | 2 | 0 | 1 (Note: Appearance in Charity Cup.) | 0 | 33 | 3 |
| Wellington Olympic | 2025 | National League | 25 | 2 | 5 | 1 | — | | — | | 30 | 3 |
| Wellington Olympic | Total | | 75 | 16 | 13 | 1 | 4 | 0 | 1 | 0 | 93 | 17 |
| Career total | | | 159 | 37 | 15 | 1 | 4 | 0 | 1 | 0 | 179 | 38 |
