= Tamupiwa Dimairo =

New Zealand footballer (born 1996)

Personal information
- Full name: Chaurura Tamupiwa Dimairo
- Date of birth: 22 March 1996 (age 30)
- Place of birth: Kwekwe, Zimbabwe
- Height: 1.76 m (5 ft 9 in)
- Positions: Defender; midfielder

Team information
- Current team: Wellington Olympic

Youth career
- 2013: Northern based U17
- 2013–2014: Team Wellington
- 2014–2015: Wellington Phoenix Reserves

Senior career*
Years	Team	Apps	(Gls)
2015	Wellington United	1	(1)
2015	Wellington Phoenix Reserves	27	(0)
2015–2016	Wellington Phoenix	1	(0)
2017	OKC Energy FC U23	5	(0)
2018–2019	Michigan Bucks	0	(0)
2019–2020	Bruno's Magpies	13	(1)
2022–	Wellington Olympic	42	(1)

International career^{‡}
2013	New Zealand U17	4	(0)
2015	New Zealand U20	3	(0)
- * Club domestic league appearances and goals as of 12 October 2023 ‡ National team caps and goals as of 28 August 2015

Chaurura Tamupiwa Dimairo (born 22 March 1996) is a footballer who plays as a defender for Bruno's Magpies in the Gibraltar National League, having previously played for Wellington Phoenix and Michigan Bucks.

On 26 August 2015, he made his professional senior debut for Wellington Phoenix FC in the 2015 FFA Cup against Melbourne City.

He has represented New Zealand at under-17 level, playing at the 2013 FIFA U-17 World Cup in the United Arab Emirates.
