= Victoria University of Wellington Association Football Club =

Amateur football club in New Zealand

- Nicknames: Vic Uni, Varsity
- Short name: VUWAFC
- Founded: 1943; 83 years ago
- Ground: Kelburn Park, Wellington
- Chairman: Chris Scarrott
- Coach: Men's: Michael Roxburgh - Women's: Andre Cantin-Buckley
- League: Capital 1
- 2026: Capital 1, 5th of 10
- Website: https://vuwafc.com/
Home colours	Away colours	Third colours

Victoria University of Wellington Association Football Club (VUWAFC) is an amateur football club based in Wellington, New Zealand. The clubrooms are located beneath the Wellington Cable Car at Kelburn Park, across the road from the Victoria University Kelburn Campus, however, many of the club's home games are played on artificial turf at Boyd Wilson Field. The club is affiliated to the Capital Football which is in turn affiliated with New Zealand Football. The Women's First Team competes in the W-League competition and the Men's First Team competes in the Capital 1. The club has a strong association with Victoria University of Wellington but membership within the club is not restricted to past or present students of the university.

== History ==
Victoria University of Wellington Association Football Club was founded in 1943 and is the third-oldest University football club in New Zealand. It now has 19 teams (4 women's and 15 men's) and over 300 registered members. Past players include New Zealand international Alan Preston and Brian Sutton-Smith who was awarded the first Education PhD in New Zealand. The club's top period was in the 1950s when it played in the Capital Football top grade as well as making the semi-final of the Chatham Cup. Since then the club has mainly played in the Capital Premier and Capital 1 grades. They have made the fourth round of the Chatham Cup a number of times including in 1979 Chatham Cup, 1988 Chatham Cup, 1994 Chatham Cup and 2014 Chatham Cup.

== Club honours ==
VUWAFC Men's and Women's First team honours include:

- Central League Division Two: Winners 1998, Third 1992
- Capital Premier* (Venus Shield): Runners Up 1956, 1973, Third 1979
- Capital One (Power Cup): Winners 1950, 1952, 1965, 2001, 2018 Runners Up 1988, 1992, 2012, Third 1999, 2006
- Capital Two: Winners 1998, Runners Up 2010, 2011, 2012
- Hilton Petone Cup Winners: 1990, 1992
- Women's Premier Division: Winners 2020 Runners Up 1995, 1996, 2012, 2018 Third 2005, 2013
- Women's Second Division: Winners 1981 Women's
- Premier Cup: Winners 2010, 2011

== League standings ==
League standings for all women's teams as of 28 August 2018

Division	Name	Position	Played	Won	Draw	Loss	GF	GA	GD	Points	Notes
Premier	Women's Firsts	2nd	14	11	1	2	44	14	34	41	Promoted to W-League
Division 1 (1)	Women's Reserves	1st	9	8	1	0	24	4	20	25	Champions: Division 1 First Half of the Season
Division 1 (2)	Women's Reserves	2nd	9	6	1	2	22	8	14	19	Promoted to Women's Premier
Division 2 (1)	Women's Thirds	5th	7	2	1	4	12	17	(5)	7	
Division 2 (2)	Women's Thirds	8th	7	1	0	6	9	24	(15)	3	Relegated to Division 3
Division 2 (1)	Unified	6th	7	2	0	5	20	19	1	6	
Division 2 (2)	Unified	6th	7	2	2	3	12	17	(5)	8	

Note - Women's Tier two competitions (Division 1 - Division 3) were split into two rounds as indicated by (1) and (2).

League standings for all men's teams as of 28 August 2018

Division	Name	Position	Played	Won	Draw	Loss	GF	GA	GD	Points	Notes
Capital 1	Men's Firsts	1st	18	12	2	4	53	30	23	38	Promoted to Capital Premier
Capital 2	Men's Reserves (Gossies)	4th	18	10	3	5	51	50	1	33	
Capital 3	Stallions	9th	18	3	3	12	29	52	(23)	12	Relegated to Capital 4
Capital 3	Men's Thirds	7th	18	5	4	9	40	57	(17)	19	
Capital 4	Accies	2nd	18	11	4	3	40	26	14	37	Promoted to Capital 3
Capital 5 (1)	Beavers	7th	9	3	0	6	21	27	(6)	9	
Capital 5 (2)	Beavers	7th	9	4	0	5	15	25	(10)	12	
Capital 6 (1)	Unibrow	8th	9	2	1	6	13	31	(18)	7	
Capital 6 (2)	Unibrow	9th	9	2	0	7	13	35	(22)	6	Relegated to Capital 7
Capital 6 (1)	Scarfies	9th	9	1	2	6	10	22	(12)	5	Relegated to Capital 7
Capital 7 (2)	Scarfies	10th	9	2	1	6	17	34	(-17)	7	Relegated to Capital 8
Capital 7 (1)	Raiders	4th	9	5	1	3	25	23	2	16	
Capital 7 (2)	Raiders	2nd	9	6	1	2	32	14	18	19	Promoted to Capital 6
Capital 8 (1)	Unicycles	1st	9	7	2	0	47	11	36	23	Promoted to Capital 7
Capital 7 (2)	Unicycles	4th	9	5	1	3	22	22	0	16	
Capital 8 (1)	Wanderers	4th	9	6	0	3	20	16	4	18	
Capital 8 (2)	Wanderers	1st	9	7	1	1	21	12	9	22	Promoted to Capital 7
Capital 9 (1)	Unicorns	5th	9	4	3	2	36	21	15	15	
Capital 9 (2)	Unicorns	4th	9	5	3	1	27	21	6	18	
Capital 10 (1)	Goldenrods	7th	9	2	2	5	17	25	(8)	8	
Capital 10 (2)	Goldenrods	9th	9	2	2	5	16	36	(20)	8	Relegated to Capital 11
Capital 11 (1)	Unilateral	1st	8	6	2	0	26	7	19	20	Promoted to Capital 10
Capital 10 (2)	Unilateral	10th	9	1	1	7	12	27	(-15)	4	Relegated to Capital 11
Masters 4	Bombers	10th	18	5	1	12	34	59	(-25)	16	Relegated to Masters 5

Note - Men's Tier two competitions (Capital 5 - Capital 12) were split into two rounds as indicated by (1) and (2).
