= Joel Coustrain =

Irish professional footballer

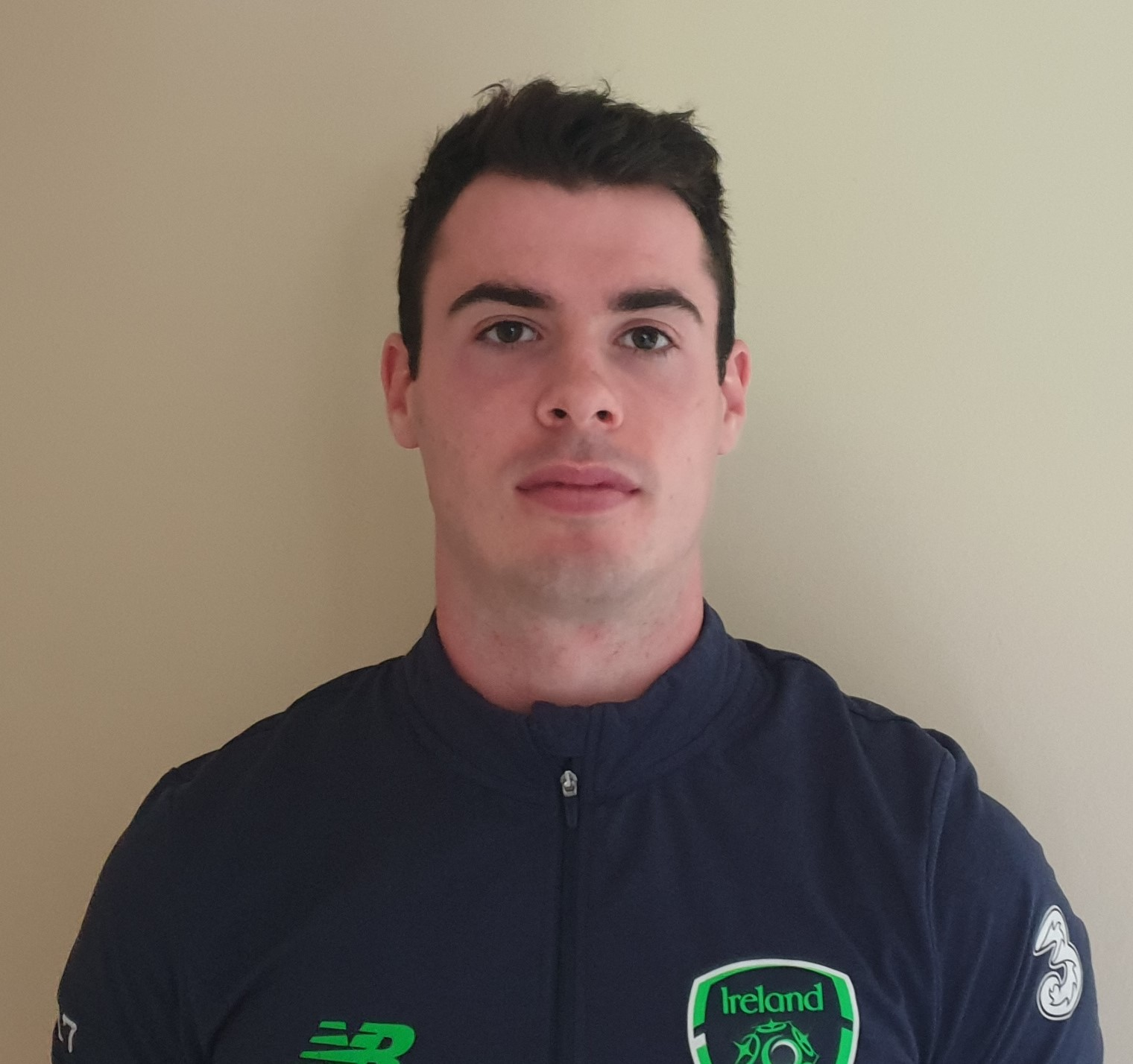
- Coustrain in 2019

Personal information
- Date of birth: 22 January 1996 (age 30)
- Place of birth: Limerick, Ireland
- Height: 1.78 m (5 ft 10 in)
- Position: Winger

Team information
- Current team: Wellington Olympic
- Number: 25

Senior career*
Years	Team	Apps	(Gls)
2014–2016	Sheffield United U18		
2016–2017	Sheffield United U21		
2017–2018	Raith Rovers	9	(1)
2019–2020	Shamrock Rovers	39	(2)
2019–2020	Cork City (loan)	13	(0)
2019–2020	Shamrock Rovers	39	(2)
2020–2021	Athlone Town	6	(0)
2021–2022	Treaty United	44	(1)
2023–2024	Aisling Annacotty	25	(19)
2024–	Wellington Olympic	2	(2)

International career
2012	Republic of Ireland U16	2	(3)
2014	Republic of Ireland U18	2	(0)
2015	Republic of Ireland U19	9	(2)
- * Club domestic league appearances and goals as of 15 September 2021

Joel Coustrain (born 22 January 1996) is an Irish professional footballer who plays for Wellington Olympic in the New Zealand National League.

== Club career ==
Born in Limerick, Coustrain first played with Corbally United in Limerick and signed for the Sheffield United F.C. Academy in 2013. In 2015 Coustrain signed a pro contract with Sheffield United. In 2016 Coustrain moved to Scottish club Raith Rovers on a free transfer. Coustrain made six appearances for Raith during the 2016/17 season, but was released from his contract in March 2017.

He signed for League of Ireland First Division club Athlone Town ahead of the 2020 season.

On 27 February 2021, it was announced that Coustrain had signed for newly formed club Treaty United in his hometown of Limerick ahead of their 2021 League of Ireland First Division campaign, their first ever season in football. Coustrain had the honour of scoring the club's first ever goal in their first ever match, a 1–1 draw with Waterford in a pre-season friendly on 2 March 2021.

== International career ==
He was capped by the Republic of Ireland with their under-16, under-18 and under-19 teams.

== Timeline ==
- 2024: Signs for Wellington Olympic AFC
- 2023: Signs for Aishling Annacotty FC
- 2021: Signs for Treaty United
- 2020: Signs for Athlone Town
- 2019: July, Plays in two UEFA Europa match's for Cork City v Progres Niederkorn
- 2019: July, Transfers to Cork City on loan deal
- 2019: Signs 2-year contract with Shamrock Rovers
- 2018: Plays in 2 UEFA Europa League Qualifiers for Shamrock Rovers.
- 2018: Signed for Shamrock Rovers Dublin, Ireland
- 2016: Signed for Raith Rovers
- 2016: Holds 14 Junior Irish caps while playing for Ireland in different age groups.
- 2015: In the European U19s qualifiers scored for Ireland against Germany and Slovakia.
- 2015: Called up for Irish U19s
- 2015: Signed his 2nd year pro contract with Sheffield United
- 2014: Called up for Irish U18s
- 2014: Signed his 1st 1 year pro contract with Sheffield United
- 2012: Signed with Sheffield United's academy for 2 years
- In April 2012 scored a hat trick for Ireland U16s against Belgium.
- 2014: Called up for Irish U19s
- 2012: Called up for Irish U16s
- 2011: Called up for Irish U15s

== Personal life ==
Coustrain was born in Limerick, Ireland and grew up in Ardnacrusha, County Clare. Coustrain attended primary school at the national school in Parteen and secondary at Villiers, Limerick.
