= Luke Tongue =

New Zealand footballer

Personal information
- Full name: Luke Tongue
- Date of birth: 25 January 1999 (age 27)
- Place of birth: Stafford, England
- Position: Defender

Team information
- Current team: Canterbury United

Youth career
- Wellington Phoenix

Senior career*
Years	Team	Apps	(Gls)
2015–2018	Wellington Phoenix Reserves	27	(1)
2017–2018	Wellington Phoenix	0	(0)
2018–	Canterbury United	33	(0)
- * Club domestic league appearances and goals as of 06:22, 8 February 2020 (UTC)

Luke Tongue (born 25 January 1999), is a New Zealand professional footballer who plays as defender for Canterbury United.

== Career ==
Tongue made his professional debut for Wellington Phoenix on 1 August 2017, playing the last 22 minutes of extra time in a 1–0 loss to Western Sydney Wanderers in the FFA Cup. On 24 January 2018, Tongue joined New Zealand Football Championship side Canterbury United.

== Honours ==
Individual

- Mainland Football Mens Midfielder of the Year: 2018, 2019
