= Hamish Watson (footballer) =

New Zealand footballer

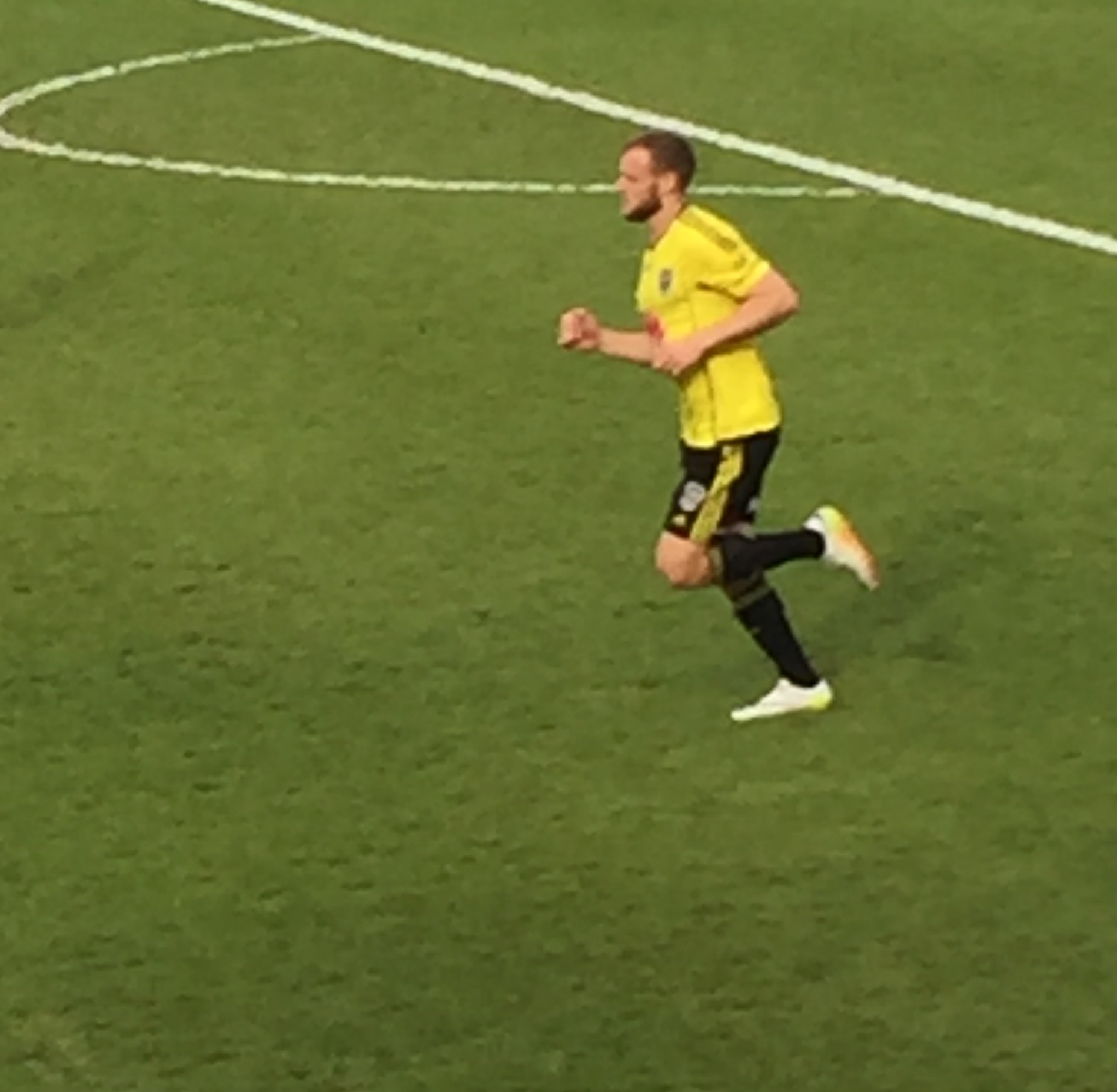
- Watson playing for Wellington Phoenix in 2016

Personal information
- Full name: Hamish John Sanders Watson
- Date of birth: 17 April 1993 (age 33)
- Place of birth: Lower Hutt, New Zealand
- Height: 1.88 m (6 ft 2 in)
- Position: Centre forward

Team information
- Current team: Wellington Olympic

Youth career
- 1997–2011: Lower Hutt City

Senior career*
Years	Team	Apps	(Gls)
2011–2012	Hawke's Bay United	13	(6)
2012–2013	Team Wellington	13	(8)
2013	→ Wellington Phoenix (loan)	0	(0)
2013–2014	Team Wellington	11	(4)
2013–2014	Wellington Phoenix	2	(0)
2014–2015	Grimsby Town	4	(0)
2014–2015	→ Gainsborough Trinity (loan)	4	(0)
2015–2016	Hawke's Bay United	11	(6)
2015–2018	Wellington Phoenix	31	(6)
2016–2018	Wellington Phoenix Reserves	4	(2)
2018–2019	Team Wellington	12	(8)
2019	Melbourne Knights	28	(14)
2019–2021	Team Wellington	21	(17)
2021	Wellington Olympic	5	(5)
2021–2022	Dandenong Thunder	9	(4)
2022	Miramar Rangers	22	(21)
2023–	Wellington Olympic	45	(34)

International career^{‡}
2013	New Zealand U-20	5	(2)
- * Club domestic league appearances and goals as of 25 November 2024 ‡ National team caps and goals as of 27 March 2014

Hamish John Sanders Watson (born 17 April 1993) is a New Zealand footballer who plays as a centre forward for Wellington Olympic.

He has previously played for Lower Hutt City, Hawke's Bay United, Grimsby Town, Wellington Phoenix and Team Wellington. He has also been capped by the New Zealand U-20 side.

== Career ==
Watson started his footballing career at Lower Hutt City at the age of 4 before moving onto the Phoenix school of excellence and making 13 appearances with Team Wellington. On 10 October 2013 he signed a one-week deal with Wellington Phoenix as a loan cover for the internationals. On 5 February 2014 he signed for A-league side Wellington Phoenix for the remainder on the 2013–14 season.

On 23 April 2014 he made his debut in the Central Premier League with Wairarapa United.

On 25 October 2014 Watson moved to England, training with Conference Premier side Grimsby Town to try earn a contract with the club. On 20 November 2014 Watson received international clearance, and on the verge of signing for Grimsby Town, he signed a short-term contract until January with the club later on that day. On 26 February 2015, having made 4 brief substitute appearances, Watson joined Conference North side Gainsborough Trinity on a one-month loan deal, to help him develop. On 20 May 2015, Watson was released by Grimsby Town.

On 30 June 2015, Watson rejoined Central Premier League side Wairarapa United.

In February 2016, Watson joined Wellington Phoenix as an injury replacement for Roy Krishna. Following a successful spell, at the end of the season Watson signed a year long professional contract with the club.

On 24 January 2018, Watson agreed to part ways with Wellington Phoenix after seeing limited game time with the team.

After another spell with Team Wellington, Watson moved to Australia, signing for National Premier Leagues Victoria side Melbourne Knights. On 12 June 2019 Watson scored a hat-trick against rivals South Melbourne FC in the last round of the Victorian 2019 FFA Cup preliminary rounds, sending his side through to the national stage of the cup.

== International career ==
Watson has represented New Zealand at the Under-20 level. They performed in the OFC U-20 Championship Tournament in Lautoka, Fiji in 2013, with every game being played at the Churchull Park Stadium, eventually finishing champions in the tournament that also featured Fiji the hosts, New Caledonia under 21, Papua New Guinea and Vanuatu. On 21 March 2013, he scored in New Zealand's 5–0 win over Papua New Guinea. On 27 March 2013, Watson scored again in the final game, beating the hosts Fiji 4–0. The team qualifying as Oceania's representative at the 2013 FIFA U-20 World Cup in Turkey which Watson attended. He played in two games at the World Cup in Turkey, first in the 0—2 lost to Uruguay, getting 12mins. Then in the 0—3 lost to Uzbekistan getting his first start.

== Career statistics ==
As of match played on 25 January 2018

Club	Season	Division	League		Total	
Club	Season	Division	Apps	Goals	Apps	Goals
Hawke's Bay United	2011–12	New Zealand Football Championship	13	6	13	6
Team Wellington	2012–13	New Zealand Football Championship	13	8	13	8
Team Wellington	2013–14	New Zealand Football Championship	11	4	11	4
Wellington Phoenix	2013–14	A-League	2	0	2	0
Grimsby Town	2014–15	Conference Premier	4	0	4	0
Gainsborough Trinity (loan)	2014–15	Conference North	4	0	4	0
Hawke's Bay United	2015–16	New Zealand Football Championship	11	6	11	6
Wellington Phoenix	2015–16	A-League	8	3	8	3
Wellington Phoenix	2016–17	A-League	21	2	21	2
Wellington Phoenix	2017–18	A-League	2	1	8	0
Wellington Phoenix Reserves	2016–17	New Zealand Football Championship	2	1	2	1
Wellington Phoenix Reserves	2016–17	New Zealand Football Championship	2	1	2	1
Career total			93	32	93	32

== Personal life ==
Watson is a keen supporter of Liverpool football club, his favorite players are Luis Suárez and Steven Gerrard.

== Honours ==
=== Club ===
Lower Hutt City

- Chatham Cup: 2012 (runners up)

Wellington Olympic Central League (2023,2024,2025) New Zealand National League (2023) Chatham Cup (2024) Hilton Petone (2025)

=== International ===
New Zealand

- OFC U-20 Championship: 2013
- FIFA U-20 World Cup: 2013 (group stage)
