= Charity Cup =

Association football tournament in New Zealand

- Organiser(s): New Zealand Football
- Founded: 1978; 48 years ago
- Region: New Zealand
- Teams: 2
- Related competitions: Chatham Cup (qualifier); National League (qualifier)
- Current champions: Wellington Olympic (1st title)
- Most championships: Auckland City (7 titles)
- Broadcasters: FIFA+; YouTube
- 2024 Charity Cup

The Charity Cup, also referred to as the NZF Charity Cup (previously known as the ASB Charity Cup for sponsorship reasons), is New Zealand's association football super cup, which takes place on annual basis.

The competition was founded in 1978 as the NZFA Challenge Trophy. The Champions of the National Soccer League and the Chatham Cup would compete in the competition. It stopped taking place after 1987.

The tournament was re-introduced in 2011 as the ASB Charity Cup. The ASB Premiership Grand Final winner meets the best performing New Zealand representative in the OFC Champions League.

Following the restructuring of football in New Zealand in 2021, the Charity Cup was again contested by the winner of the Chatham Cup and the winner of the National League, beginning with the 2024 season.

The current holders are 2023 New Zealand National League winners Wellington Olympic, who beat 2023 Chatham Cup winners Christchurch United 3–0 in the 2024 fixture.

== Results ==
NZFA Challenge Trophy
1978	Manurewa AFC	2–0	Christchurch United
1980	University-Mount Wellington	3–1	North Shore United
1981	University-Mount Wellington	2–0	Gisborne City
1982	Wellington United	1–1 (5–4)	Dunedin City
1983	University-Mount Wellington	1–0	North Shore United
1984	Manurewa AFC	2–1	University-Mount Wellington
1985	Gisborne City	1–0	Manurewa AFC
1986	Wellington United	2–0	Napier City Rovers
1987	North Shore United	3–0	University-Mount Wellington
Charity Cup
2011	Auckland City	3–2	Waitakere United
2012	Waitakere United	2–1	Auckland City
2013	Auckland City	4–1	Waitakere United
2014	Team Wellington	2–2 (4–3)	Auckland City
2015	Auckland City	3–0	Team Wellington
2016	Auckland City	3–1	Team Wellington
2017	Team Wellington	3–1	Auckland City
2018	Auckland City	4–3	Team Wellington
2019	Auckland City	2–0	Eastern Suburbs
2020	Auckland City	3–1	Team Wellington
2024	Wellington Olympic	3–0	Christchurch United

== Champions ==
Team	Titles	Years
Auckland City	7	2011, 2013, 2015, 2016, 2018, 2019, 2020
Uni-Mount Bohemian AFC	3	1980, 1981, 1983
Manurewa AFC	2	1978, 1984
Wellington United	2	1982, 1986
Team Wellington	2	2014, 2017
Gisborne City	1	1985
North Shore United	1	1987
Waitakere United	1	2012
Wellington Olympic	1	2024
