= 2025 New Zealand National League Grand Final =

2025 edition of the New Zealand National League Grand Final

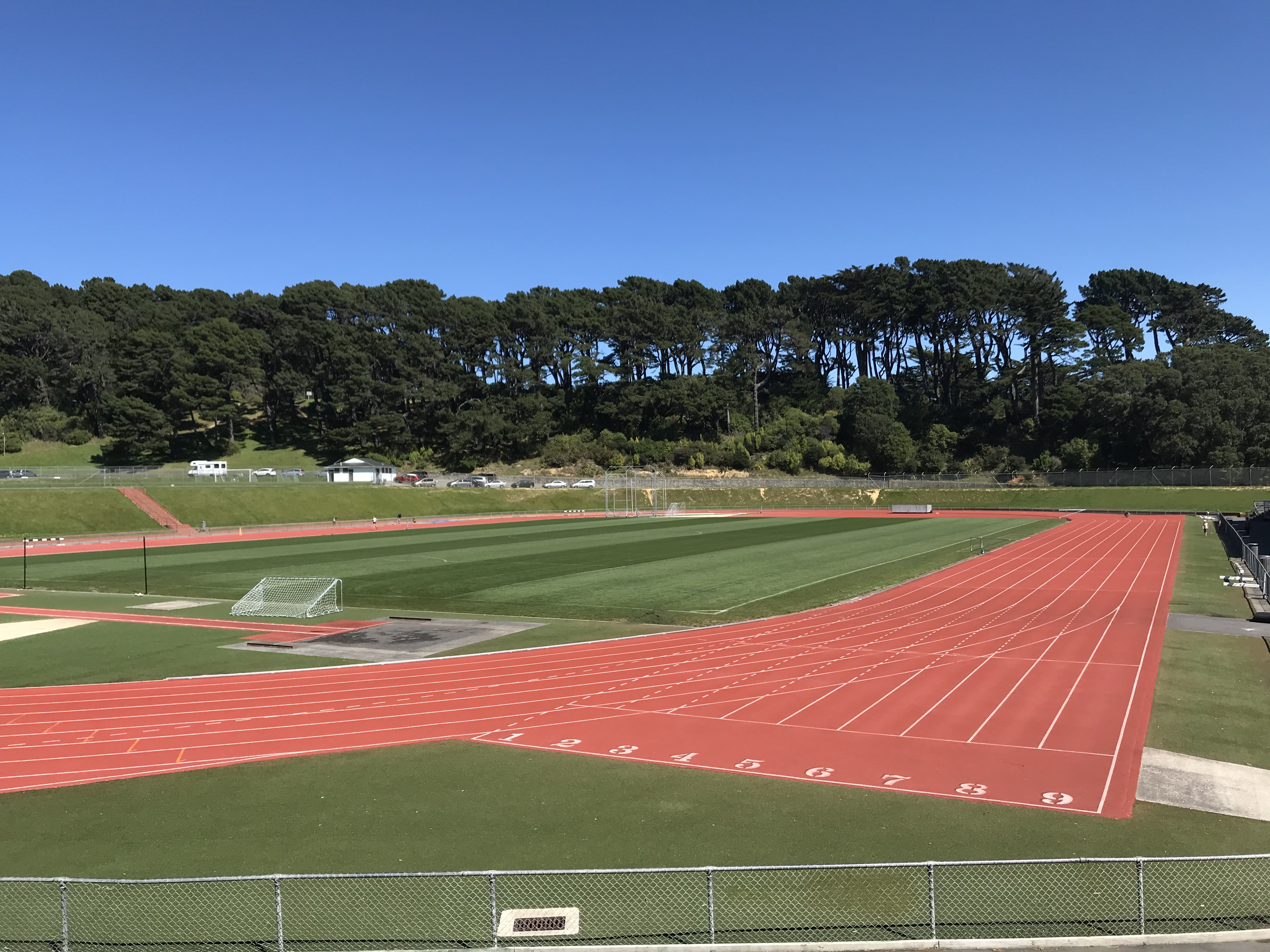
- The match was held at Newtown Park
- Event: 2025 New Zealand National League
Wellington Olympic	Auckland City
2	2
- After extra time Auckland City won 7–6 on penalties
- Date: 13 December 2025
- Venue: Newtown Park, Wellington
- Steve Sumner Trophy: Haris Zeb (Auckland City)
- Referee: Calvin Berg
- Weather: Clear; 17 °C (63 °F); 68% humidity

The 2025 New Zealand National League Grand Final, known officially as the Dettol National League Grand Final, was a scheduled association football match played between Wellington Olympic and Auckland City on 13 December 2025 at Newtown Park in Wellington.

The match determined the champions of the New Zealand National League and was the 4th New Zealand National League Grand Final, the culmination of the 2025 season and the 32nd New Zealand National Football Leagues final.

== Background ==
Wellington Olympic were playing their first Grand Final since 2023, where they won 2–0 against Auckland City. This was Olympic's third Grand Final in their history, and third in four years, after losing their first final 3–2 to Auckland City.

For Auckland City, this was their fourth consecutive New Zealand National League Grand Final and fifth consecutive New Zealand National Football Leagues final. The Navy Blues won last years Grand Final 2–1 after extra time against Birkenhead United.

=== Previous finals ===
In the following table, finals until 2003 were in the National Soccer League era, from 2005 to 2021 were in the Football Championship era, since 2021 were in the National League era.

Team	Previous grand final appearances (bold indicates winners)
Wellington Olympic	2 (2022, **2023**)
Auckland City	15 (**2005**, **2006**, **2007**, **2009**, 2011, 2013, **2014**, **2015**, 2016, 2017, **2018**, 2021, **2022**, 2023, **2024**)

== Road to the final ==
=== Summary ===
Following the regional qualifiers, an 11 week Championship phase was played to determine the two finalists of the National League. The top 4 teams from the Northern League and Auckland FC Reserves; top three from the Central League and Wellington Phoenix Reserves; and the top 2 from the Southern League. The top two highest-placed teams then qualified for the Grand Final. The finalists who placed higher on the table would host the Grand Final.

Wellington Olympic
Round
Auckland City
2025 Central League
1st placed

Pos	Team	Pld	Pts
1	Wellington Olympic (C)	18	49
2	Miramar Rangers	18	39
3	Western Suburbs	18	34
4	Wellington Phoenix Reserves	18	29
5	Napier City Rovers	18	28

Source: Capital Football
(C) Champions
Regional phase
2025 Northern League
4th placed

Pos	Team	Pld	Pts
2	Birkenhead United	22	41
3	Auckland United	22	40
4	Auckland City	22	40
5	Eastern Suburbs	22	40
6	East Coast Bays	22	36

Source: NRF
2025 National League
1st placed

Pos	Team	Pld	Pts
1	Wellington Olympic	10	21
2	Auckland City (C)	10	20
3	Miramar Rangers	10	19
4	Auckland FC Reserves	10	18
5	Western Springs	10	16

Source: New Zealand Football
(C) Champions
Championship phase
2025 National League
2nd placed

Pos	Team	Pld	Pts
1	Wellington Olympic	10	21
2	Auckland City (C)	10	20
3	Miramar Rangers	10	19
4	Auckland FC Reserves	10	18
5	Western Springs	10	16

Source: New Zealand Football
(C) Champions

=== Wellington Olympic ===
Wellington Olympic opened their season with a 1–0 win over Miramar Rangers in the Central League. Olympic won their opening eight games, storming to the lead in the Central League. They qualified for the New Zealand National League championship phase on 18 July 2025 after beating North Wellington 5–1. On 23 August 2025 Olympic won the Central League for the fifth consecutive time after beating Island Bay United 5–0.

Olympic's opening game in the National League was a 5–3 victory over Wellington Phoenix Reserves. They won their first three games before losing 1–0 against grand final opponents Auckland City. Olympic qualified for the Grand Final after winning their final game against fellow contenders Miramar Rangers. Ben Mata opened the scoring before Ronaldo Muñoz equalised for Miramar. Despite going down to 10 men when Justin Gulley was sent off just before half-time, Olympic were able to find a second-half winner thanks to Gianni Bouzoukis.

=== Auckland City ===
Auckland City began their season with a 2–1 victory at home to Tauranga City in the Northern League. After winning their first three games, City headed to Solomon Islands for the 2025 OFC Men's Champions League. City had a disrupted season competing in the 2025 FIFA Club World Cup, struggling to find consistency with their packed schedule. Auckland qualified for the championship phase on the final day of the season after beating East Coast Bays 2–0 to take the final qualifying spot.

The Navy Blues were awarded a bye in the first round of the National League before losing their first fixture 3–0 away to Birkenhead United. Again struggling to find consistency, City were outside the top two until the final game week, where they beat Coastal Spirit 3–0 to qualify in second. Mario Ilich, Christian Gray and Myer Bevan all scored second-half goals to help City reach their fifth straight final.

== Pre-match ==
Wellington Olympic announced before the final that head coaches Paul Ifill and Ekow Quainoo would both be stepping down for the role, with Ifill also leaving his role as director of football.

=== Venue selection ===
The results of the final game week confirmed the finalists and that the final would be played in Wellington. New Zealand Football selected Wellington's Newtown Park to host the Grand Final. Newtown Park has a capacity of 5,000 fans.

=== Broadcasting ===
The match was broadcast live and free on FIFA+.

=== Team selection ===
Olympic were without Hamish Watson and Noah Boyce due to injury. Justin Gulley missed out due to suspension after being sent-off the week before, while Adam Supyk had already departed for the OFC Pro League.

City welcomed back Adam Mitchell into the starting line-up after an injury left him out for a month of action before the last game. Gerard Garriga returned to the squad, while Michael den Heijer was unavailable.

== Match ==
=== Details ===
13 December 2025
18:00 NZDT

Wellington Olympic	2–2 (a.e.t.)	Auckland City
Stoupe 90+3'; Prins 101'	Report	Ellis 81'; Gray 120+2'
Penalties
Mata (penalty scored); Prins (penalty scored); Mason-Smith (penalty scored); Davenport-Petersen (penalty scored); Solomon (penalty missed); Reynolds (penalty scored); Barclay (penalty scored); Davies (penalty missed)	6–7	(penalty missed) Ilich; (penalty scored) Zeb; (penalty scored) Ellis; (penalty scored) Kilkolly; (penalty scored) Gray; (penalty scored) Lobo; (penalty scored) Manickum; (penalty scored) Boxall

Newtown Park, Wellington
Referee: Calvin Berg

Wellington Olympic	Auckland City

GK	1	(New Zealand) Scott Basalaj
CB	4	(Cyprus) Alexander Solomon
CB	15	(Cook Islands) Ben Mata (c)	(yellow card) 77'
CB	13	(New Zealand) William Vincent	(yellow card) 87'
RM	8	(New Zealand) Jonty Roubos		(substituted off) 64'
CM	6	(New Zealand) Tor Davenport-Petersen
CM	16	(New Zealand) Tiahn Manuel		(substituted off) 109'
LM	7	(New Zealand) Isa Prins
RW	23	(Canada) Gavin Hoy		(substituted off) 82'
CF	10	(New Zealand) Gianni Bouzoukis		(substituted off) 82'
LW	14	(New Zealand) Jack-Henry Sinclair		(substituted off) 119'
Substitutes:
GK	21	(New Zealand) Oscar Boyce
DF	11	(New Zealand) Alex Davies		(substituted on) 109'
MF	17	(United States) John Reynolds	(yellow card) 105'	(substituted on) 64'
MF	18	(New Zealand) Surafil Keleab
FW	12	(New Zealand) Luca Barclay		(substituted on) 119'
FW	19	(New Zealand) Luke Stoupe	(yellow card) 108'	(substituted on) 82'
FW	22	(England) Sam Mason-Smith		(substituted on) 82'
Manager:
(Barbados) Paul Ifill

GK	24	(New Zealand) Nathan Garrow
CB	3	(New Zealand) Adam Mitchell		(substituted off) 111'
CB	4	(New Zealand) Christian Gray	(yellow card) 96'
CB	5	(New Zealand) Nikko Boxall
RM	23	(New Zealand) Riley Dalziell		(substituted off) 91'
CM	22	(China) Zhou Tong		(substituted off) 91'
CM	2	(New Zealand) Mario Ilich (c)	(yellow card) 84'
LM	27	(Pakistan) Haris Zeb
RW	26	(New Zealand) David Yoo		(substituted off) 80'
CF	11	(New Zealand) Ryan de Vries		(substituted off) 67'
LW	7	(New Zealand) Myer Bevan		(substituted off) 79'
Substitutes:
GK	18	(Uruguay) Sebastián Ciganda
DF	13	(New Zealand) Nathan Lobo		(substituted on) 91'
MF	6	(New Zealand) Orlando Thorpe		(substituted on) 91'
MF	8	(Spain) Gerard Garriga		(substituted on) 111'
MF	19	(New Zealand) Matt Ellis		(substituted on) 80'
FW	9	(New Zealand) Angus Kilkolly		(substituted on) 79'
FW	10	(New Zealand) Dylan Manickum		(substituted on) 67'
Manager:
(New Zealand) Paul Posa

Man of the Match (Steve Sumner Trophy):
Haris Zeb (Auckland City)

Assistant referees:
Gareth Sheehan
Ashton Davenport
Fourth official:
Cory Mills

Match rules

- 90 minutes.
- 30 minutes of extra time if necessary.
- Penalty shoot-out if scores still level.
- Seven named substitutes.
- Maximum of five substitutions, with a sixth allowed in extra time. (Note: Each team is given only three opportunities to make substitutions, with a fourth opportunity in extra time, excluding substitutions made at half-time, before the start of extra time and at half-time in extra time.)

=== Statistics ===
First half
Statistic	Wellington Olympic	Auckland City
Goals scored	0	0
Total shots	3	9
Shots on target	0	3
Ball possession	44%	56%
Corner kicks	3	4
Yellow cards	0	0
Red cards	0	0

Second half
Statistic	Wellington Olympic	Auckland City
Goals scored	1	1
Total shots	7	11
Shots on target	2	2
Ball possession	44%	56%
Corner kicks	1	6
Yellow cards	2	1
Red cards	0	0

Extra time
Statistic	Wellington Olympic	Auckland City
Goals scored	1	1
Total shots	5	7
Shots on target	3	4
Ball possession	44%	56%
Corner kicks	1	1
Yellow cards	2	1
Red cards	0	0

Overall
Statistic	Wellington Olympic	Auckland City
Goals scored	2	2
Total shots	15	27
Shots on target	5	9
Ball possession	44%	56%
Corner kicks	5	11
Yellow cards	4	2
Red cards	0	0

== Post-match ==
The result was City's second consecutive National League title and their tenth national title overall.

Haris Zeb was awarded the Steve Sumner Trophy for the best player of the match.

Following the final, City announced manager Paul Posa had stepped down following the completion of his one-year contract.
