= 2025 Auckland City FC season =

Football club season

Auckland City
2025 season
- Chairman: Ivan Vuksich
- Manager: Paul Posa
- Stadium: Kiwitea Street
- Northern League: 4th
- National League: 2nd
- National League Final: Winners
- Chatham Cup: Round 3
- OFC Champions League: Winners
- FIFA Club World Cup: Group stage
- FIFA Intercontinental Cup: First round
- Top goalscorer: League: Myer Bevan (10); All: Myer Bevan (13)
- Biggest win: 4–0 vs Onehunga Mangere United (A), 31 May 2025, Chatham Cup
- Biggest defeat: 0–10 vs Bayern Munich (N), 15 June 2025, FIFA Club World Cup
Home colours	Away colours	Third colours

The 2025 season was the 22nd in the history of Auckland City Football Club. In addition to the domestic league, the club participated in the Chatham Cup for the fifth time, the OFC Men's Champions League for the 20th time and the FIFA Club World Cup for the 12th time. By winning the OFC Champions League, they also qualified for the FIFA Intercontinental Cup for the second time.

== Overview ==
=== Pre-season ===
Auckland City began their preseason fixtures with a 2–2 draw against Eastern Suburbs at the Croatian Cultural Club.

=== Northern League ===
The league fixtures were announced on 28 February 2025. City played the season opener against Tauranga City, and finished the season home to East Coast Bays.

Auckland City's round four fixture with Western Springs was originally scheduled for 14 May 2025 due to the Navy Blue's participation in the OFC Champions League. On 9 April, City announced the fixture had been moved back to the original match week on 12 April 2025 due to Auckland City's increased fixture congestion. This meant City would be playing two games on the same day with them playing the OFC Champions League final on the same day.

=== National League ===
The league fixtures were announced on 16 September 2025. City have a bye in the first round, before playing Birkenhead United away in their opening game. They close out the National League at home to Coastal Spirit.

== Kits ==
Home	Home alt.	Away	2024 Away	Third	Third alt.

== Players ==
Players and squad numbers last updated on 11 October 2025.

Note: Flags indicate national team as defined under FIFA eligibility rules; some limited exceptions apply. Players may hold more than one non-FIFA nationality.

No.	Pos.	Nation	Player
1	GK	NZL	Conor Tracey
2	MF	NZL	Mario Ilich (captain)
3	DF	NZL	Adam Mitchell
4	DF	NZL	Christian Gray
5	DF	NZL	Nikko Boxall
6	MF	NZL	Jackson Manuel
7	FW	NZL	Myer Bevan
8	MF	ESP	Gerard Garriga
9	FW	NZL	Angus Kilkolly
10	FW	NZL	Dylan Manickum
11	FW	NZL	Ryan De Vries
12	DF	KOS	Regont Murati
13	DF	NZL	Nathan Lobo
14	DF	NZL	Jordan Vale
15	MF	NZL	Jeremy Foo
16	FW	NZL	Joseph Lee

No.	Pos.	Nation	Player
17	FW	COL	Jerson Lagos
18	GK	FIJ	Areya Prasad
19	DF	IRL	Dylan Connolly
20	MF	NZL	Matt Ellis
21	DF	NZL	Adam Bell
22	DF	CHN	Zhou Tong
23	DF	NZL	Alfie Rogers
24	GK	NZL	Nathan Garrow
25	DF	NZL	Michael den Heijer
26	MF	NZL	David Yoo
27	FW	PAK	Haris Zeb
29	DF	NZL	Riley Dalziell
30	MF	NZL	Orlando Thorpe
32	MF	NZL	Paris Domfeh
—	GK	URU	Sebastián Ciganda

=== Other players with first-team appearances ===
Note: Flags indicate national team as defined under FIFA eligibility rules; some limited exceptions apply. Players may hold more than one non-FIFA nationality.

No.	Pos.	Nation	Player
—	GK	NZL	Reon Werahiko
—	DF	NZL	Jesse Gage
—	DF	NZL	Mason Shaw
—	DF	NZL	Niko Tarawa
—	MF	NZL	Samuel Fagan
—	MF	NZL	Sebastien Harris
—	MF	NZL	Kaio Martinez

No.	Pos.	Nation	Player
—	MF	NZL	Manraj Singh
—	MF	SAM	Cayden Steffener
—	FW	NZL	Niko Clare
—	FW	NZL	Santino Escolme
—	FW	NZL	Carlos Stulich
—	FW	NZL	Bond Tran
—	FW	NZL	Kane Winstanley

== Management team ==
Staff last updated on 16 March 2025.

Position	Staff
Head coach	(New Zealand) Paul Posa
Assistant coach	(New Zealand) Ivan Vicelich
Assistant coach	(South Korea) Kim Dae-wook
Goalkeeper coach	(Germany) Jonas Hoffmann
Technical	(Spain) Adrià Casals
Physio	(New Zealand) Matt Payne

== Transfers ==
=== Transfers in ===
No.	Position	Player	Transferred from	Type/fee	Contract length	Date	Ref.
15	MF	(New Zealand) Jeremy Foo	(New Zealand) Manurewa	Free transfer	1 year	1 January 2025	
32	MF	(New Zealand) Paris Domfeh	(New Zealand) Wellington Phoenix Reserves	Free transfer	1 year	1 January 2025	
26	MF	(New Zealand) David Yoo	(New Zealand) Coastal Spirit	Free transfer	1 year	15 January 2025	
19	DF	(Republic of Ireland) Dylan Connolly	(New Zealand) Birkenhead United	Free transfer	1 year	28 January 2025	
27	FW	(Pakistan) Haris Zeb	(New Zealand) Birkenhead United	Free transfer	1 year	28 January 2025	
15	MF	(New Zealand) Jackson Manuel	(New Zealand) Western Springs	Free transfer	1 year	10 February 2025	
20	MF	(New Zealand) Matthew Ellis	(New Zealand) Western Springs	Free transfer	1 year	11 February 2025	
28	FW	(New Zealand) Otto Ingham	(Sweden) AFC Eskilstuna	Free transfer	1 year	5 March 2025	
5	DF	(New Zealand) Nikko Boxall	(New Zealand) Eastern Suburbs	Free transfer	1 year	14 March 2025	
—	GK	(Uruguay) Sebastián Ciganda	(New Zealand) Waiheke United	Free transfer	6 months	6 June 2025	
30	MF	(New Zealand) Orlando Thorpe	(New Zealand) East Coast Bays	Free transfer	3 months	29 September 2025	
29	DF	(New Zealand) Riley Dalziell	(New Zealand) Eastern Suburbs	Free transfer	3 months	6 October 2025	

=== Transfers out ===
No.	Position	Player	Transferred to	Type/fee	Date	Ref.
27	FW	(New Zealand) Stipe Ukich	(Croatia) Istra 1961	End of contract	6 January 2025	
15	DF	(New Zealand) Aston Burns	(New Zealand) Fencibles United	End of contract	13 February 2025	
20	FW	(Ghana) Derek Tieku	(New Zealand) Bay Olympic	End of contract	17 February 2025	
6	DF	(New Zealand) Marco Lorenz	(New Zealand) Auckland United	Free transfer	17 March 2025	
28	FW	(New Zealand) Otto Ingham	(New Zealand) Auckland United	Free transfer	30 April 2025	
29	MF	(Japan) Kentaro Ozaki	(Australia) Upfield	Free transfer	10 May 2025	
31	FW	(New Zealand) Ryan Ellis	(New Zealand) Western Springs	Free transfer	2 July 2025	
6	FW	(England) Kailan Gould	(England) Taunton Town	Free transfer	July 2025	

== Pre-season and friendlies ==
15 February 2025	Auckland City	2–2	Auckland City B	Te Atatū South
10:00	Goal	Report (NZF)	Goal	Stadium: Croatian Cultural Club; Referee: Alec Couchman

22 February 2025	Eastern Suburbs	2–2	Auckland City	Te Atatū South
10:00	Goal	Report (NZF); Report (FoF)	Yoo	Stadium: Croatian Cultural Club; Referee: Jack Henderson

5 March 2025	Auckland City	7–0	East Coast Bays	Te Atatū South
19:00	Yoo; Ilich; Ellis; Lee; Ingham; Zhou; de Vries	Report (NZF); Report (AFC)		Stadium: Croatian Cultural Club; Referee: Ashley Wilson

8 March 2025	Bay Olympic	1–3	Auckland City	Titirangi
10:30	Goal	Report (NZF); Report (AFC)	Yoo; Ilich; Vale	Stadium: Crum Park; Referee: Ronald van Zuilen

5 June 2025	Philadelphia Union II (United States)	0–2	(New Zealand) Auckland City	Chester
13:00		Report	de Vries 51'; Murati 63'	Stadium: Subaru Park; Attendance: 0 (Behind closed doors)

9 June 2025	Al Ain (United Arab Emirates)	1–0	(New Zealand) Auckland City	Alexandria
16:00	Laba 24'	Source		Stadium: Episcopal High School; Attendance: 0 (Behind closed doors)

10 September 2025	United (United Arab Emirates)	1–0	(New Zealand) Auckland City	Dubai
18:00	Gustavo 34'	Report		Stadium: Dubai Sports City; Attendance: 0 (Behind closed doors)

== Competitions ==
=== Overall record ===
Competition	First match	Last match	Starting round	Final position	Record							
Competition	First match	Last match	Starting round	Final position	Pld	W	D	L	GF	GA	GD	Win %
Northern League	15 March 2025	30 August 2025	Matchday 1	4th	22	12	4	6	35	24	+11	54.55
National League	5 October 2025	6 December 2025	Matchday 1	2nd	10	6	2	2	19	14	+5	60.00
National League Final	13 December 2024		Final	Winners	1	0	1	0	2	2	+0	0.00
Chatham Cup	2 June 2025	14 June 2025	Round 2	Round 3	2	1	0	1	5	2	+3	50.00
OFC Champions League	30 March 2025	12 April 2025	Group stage	Winners	5	4	1	0	8	1	+7	80.00
FIFA Club World Cup	15 June 2025	24 June 2025	Group stage	Group stage	3	0	1	2	1	17	−16	0.00
FIFA Intercontinental Cup	14 September 2025		First round	First round	1	0	0	1	0	3	−3	0.00
Total					44	23	9	12	70	63	+7	52.27

Source: Soccerway

=== Northern League ===
==== League table ====
Pos	Team	Pld	W	D	L	GF	GA	GD	Pts	Qualification
2	Birkenhead United	22	12	5	5	55	33	+22	41	Qualification to National League Championship
3	Auckland United	22	12	4	6	47	32	+15	40	Qualification to National League Championship
4	Auckland City	22	12	4	6	35	24	+11	40	Qualification to National League Championship
5	Eastern Suburbs	22	12	4	6	35	27	+8	40	
6	East Coast Bays	22	10	6	6	32	27	+5	36	

Source: NRF
Rules for classification: 1) Points; 2) Goal difference; 3) Goals scored; 4) Goals against; 5) Head to head; 6) Disciplinary record; 7) Coin toss

==== Results summary ====
Overall								Home						Away					
Pld	W	D	L	GF	GA	GD	Pts	W	D	L	GF	GA	GD	W	D	L	GF	GA	GD
22	12	4	6	35	24	+11	40	8	1	2	18	9	+9	4	3	4	17	15	+2

Source: Ultimate NZ Soccer

==== Results by round ====
Round	3^{1}	2^{2}	1	4	5	6	7	8	9	10	13^{3}	11	12	16	17	14^{4}	15^{5}	18	19	20	21	22
Ground	H	H	A	H	A	H	A	H	A	A	H	H	A	A	A	A	H	H	A	H	A	H
Result	W	W	W	L	L	W	W	L	L	D	W	W	W	L	L	W	W	D	D	W	D	W
Position	1	1	1	2	6	4	2	4	6	5	2	2	2	7	7	5	3	5	5	4	4	4
Points	3	6	9	9	9	12	15	15	15	16	19	22	25	25	25	28	31	32	33	36	37	40

Source: Ultimate NZ Soccer
A = Away; H = Home; N = Neutral; W = Win; D = Draw; L = Loss
Notes:
- ^{1} Matchday 3 (vs Tauranga City) was moved due to Auckland City's participation in the OFC Champions League.
- ^{2} Matchday 2 (vs West Coast Rangers) was moved due to Auckland City's participation in the OFC Champions League.
- ^{3} Matchday 13 (vs Manurewa) was moved due to Auckland City's participation in the FIFA Club World Cup.
- ^{4} Matchday 14 (vs Western Springs) was moved due to Auckland City's participation in the FIFA Club World Cup.
- ^{5} Matchday 15 (vs Birkenhead United) was moved due to Auckland City's participation in the FIFA Club World Cup.

==== Matches ====
Win Draw Loss Fixtures

15 March 2025 3	Auckland City	2–1	Tauranga City	Sandringham
15:00 NZDT	Ilich 59'; Mitchell (red card) 65'; Boxall (yellow card) 70'; Zhou (red card) 74'; Bevan 90+9' (yellow card) 90+9'	Report	Molloy 2'; Acebo (yellow card) 69'; Daly (yellow card) 85'; Fisher-Vanderveen (yellow card) 90+3'	Stadium: Kiwitea Street; Referee: Ashley Wilson

18 March 2025 2	Auckland City	2–1	West Coast Rangers	Te Atatū South
19:30 NZDT	Foo 45+2'; Manickum 79'; Vale (yellow card) 90'; Boxall (yellow card) 90'	Report	Machuca 43'; Newman (yellow card) 85'	Stadium: Croatian Cultural Club; Referee: Luke Gardner

23 March 2025 1	Manurewa	0–1	Auckland City	Manurewa
15:00 NZDT		Report	Bevan 71' (pen.); Domfeh (yellow card) 90+6'	Stadium: Manurewa War Memorial Park; Referee: Riley Greenbury
Note: Originally scheduled for 22 March 2025.

12 April 2025 4	Auckland City	0–1	Western Springs	Sandringham
15:00 NZST	Rogers (yellow card) 78'	Report	Wallace 34'; Davies (yellow card) 71'	Stadium: Kiwitea Street; Referee: Othmane Jebli
Note: Originally scheduled for 14 May 2025 due to Auckland City's participation in the OFC Champions League. Match was rescheduled to 12 April 2025 due to Auckland City's increased fixture congestion.

18 April 2025 5	Birkenhead United	2–1	Auckland City	Beach Haven
15:00 NZST	Botica 8' (yellow card) 60'; Clout (yellow card) 36' (goal) 67'; Chung (yellow card) 90+6'; Palmer (yellow card) 90+7'	Report	Chung 20' (o.g.); Ilich (yellow card) 64'; Garriga (yellow card) 80'; Boxall (yellow card) 90+7'	Stadium: Shepherds Park; Referee: Riley Greenbury

21 April 2025 6	Auckland City	1–0	Bay Olympic	Sandringham
15:00 NZST	Vale 49'	Report		Stadium: Kiwitea Street; Referee: Benjamin Norman

26 April 2025 7	Fencibles United	1–2	Auckland City	Pakuranga Heights
19:00 NZST	Burns 51'; Rahming Jr. (yellow card) 62'	Report	Boxall (yellow card) 54'; Grubjesic 74' (o.g.); Kilkolly 80'	Stadium: Riverhills Park; Referee: Andres Castro

3 May 2025 8	Auckland City	0–1	Auckland FC Reserves	Sandringham
15:00 NZST	Gray (yellow card) 23'; Lagos (red card) 73'; Bevan (yellow card) 90+1'	Report	D'Hotman (yellow card) 41'; McKenlay (yellow card) 55'; Nair (yellow card) 73'; Bidois 74'	Stadium: Kiwitea Street; Referee: Jack Henderson

10 May 2025 9	Eastern Suburbs	1–0	Auckland City	Kohimarama
15:00 NZST	Irwin 19'; Karunaratne (yellow card) 45+3'; Echague (yellow card) 61'; Bates (yellow card) 65'	Report	Bevan (yellow card) 64'	Stadium: Madills Farm; Referee: Veer Singh

17 May 2025 10	East Coast Bays	2–2	Auckland City	Oteha
17:30 NZST	Edgeler 33' (yellow card) 41'; Ishibashi 70'	Report	Bevan 18'; Zeb 81'	Stadium: Bay City Park; Referee: Hayden Tutbury

21 May 2025 13	Auckland City	5–2	Manurewa	Te Atatū South
19:30 NZST	Bevan 14'; Garriga 27'; Ellis 55', 70', 90+3'	Report	Zara 43'; Paez 57'; Blassou (yellow card) 75'	Stadium: Croatian Cultural Club; Referee: Veer Singh

24 May 2025 11	Auckland City	1–0	Auckland United	Sandringham
14:00 NZST	Ilich 54'	Report	Izumi (yellow card) 34'	Stadium: Kiwitea Street; Referee: Ashley Wilson

30 May 2025 12	West Coast Rangers	2–5	Auckland City	Whenuapai
19:00 NZST	Pearce 38', 53'; Alama (yellow card) 65'; Buckingham (yellow card) 84'	Report	Yoo 13'; Bell 23' (yellow card) 60' (yellow-red card) 90+5'; Ilich 26'; Zhou 73'; Bevan 90+4'	Stadium: Fred Taylor Park; Referee: Luke Gardner

12 July 2025 16	Tauranga City	2–1	Auckland City	Mount Maunganui
15:00 NZST	Wellsbury 35' (yellow card) 90+8'; Crawford (yellow card) 47'; Molloy 69'; Davidson (yellow card) 78'	Report	Yoo 10'	Stadium: Links Avenue Reserve; Referee: Nick Waldron

19 July 2025 17	Bay Olympic	1–0	Auckland City	New Lynn
15:00 NZST	Tieku 40'; Burge (yellow card) 45+1'	Report		Stadium: Olympic Park; Referee: Kirk Davis

26 July 2025 14	Western Springs	1–2	Auckland City	Western Springs
17:00 NZST	Hackett 34'; Browne 71'	Report	Yoo 45+2'; Gray 90+3'	Stadium: Seddon Fields; Referee: Ashley Wilson

30 July 2025 15	Auckland City	2–1	Birkenhead United	Te Atatū South
19:00 NZST	Zeb 58'; Lagos (yellow card) 88'; Yoo 90+2'	Report	Botica 70'; Philip (yellow card) 80'; Clout (yellow card) 88'; Preece (yellow card) 89'; Bailey (yellow card) 90+5'	Stadium: Croatian Cultural Club; Referee: Stephen Merriman

2 August 2025 18	Auckland City	1–1	Fencibles United	Sandringham
15:00 NZST	Garriga (yellow card) 32'; Gray (yellow card) 47'; Bevan 79' (pen.)	Report	Laing-McConnell 43' (yellow card) 83'; Brocklebank (yellow card) 46'; Wessels (yellow card) 90+5'	Stadium: Kiwitea Street; Referee: Anna-Marie Keighley

9 August 2025 19	Auckland FC Reserves	1–1	Auckland City	Whenuapai
15:00 NZST	Nair (yellow card) 25'; Martin (yellow card) 62'; Phoenix 90+1'	Report	Foo 40'	Stadium: Fred Taylor Park; Referee: Luke Gardner

19 August 2025 20	Auckland City	2–1	Eastern Suburbs	Te Atatū South
19:30 NZST	Gray 10'; Bevan (yellow card) 44' (goal) 62'; Murati (yellow card) 50'; Lagos (yellow card) 77'	Report	Mechell 60'	Stadium: Croatian Cultural Club; Referee: Luke Gardner
Note: Originally scheduled for 16 August 2025. Rescheduled due to Eastern Suburbs' participation in the Chatham Cup.

22 August 2025 21	Auckland United	2–2	Auckland City	Mount Roskill
17:30 NZST	Conroy 55'; Atkinson 67'; Khaled (yellow card) 87'; Curry (yellow card)	Report	Garriga 15'; Lagos 23'	Stadium: Keith Hay Park; Referee: Campbell-kirk Kawana-Waugh

30 August 2025 22	Auckland City	2–0	East Coast Bays	Sandringham
15:00 NZST	Bevan 30'; Ilich (yellow card) 38'; Boxall (yellow card) 38'; Yoo 86'	Report	Brown (yellow card) 45+2'; Caunter (yellow card) 50'; Paulsen (yellow card) 62'; Matanyayire (yellow card) 62' (yellow-red card) 83'	Stadium: Kiwitea Street; Referee: Nick Waldron

=== National League ===
==== League table ====
Pos	Team	Pld	W	D	L	GF	GA	GD	Pts	Qualification
1	Wellington Olympic	10	7	0	3	23	14	+9	21	Qualification to Grand Final
2	Auckland City (C)	10	6	2	2	19	14	+5	20	Qualification to Grand Final and Champions League group stage
3	Miramar Rangers	10	6	1	3	25	14	+11	19	
4	Auckland FC Reserves (Note: Auckland FC Reserves and Wellington Phoenix Reserves can not qualify for the Grand Final.)	10	5	3	2	17	10	+7	18	
5	Western Springs	10	5	1	4	16	13	+3	16	

Source: New Zealand Football
Rules for classification: 1) Points; 2) Goal difference; 3) Goals for; 4) Goals against; 5) Head to head; 6) Disciplinary record
(C) Champions

==== Results summary ====
Overall								Home						Away					
Pld	W	D	L	GF	GA	GD	Pts	W	D	L	GF	GA	GD	W	D	L	GF	GA	GD
10	6	2	2	19	14	+5	20	4	1	0	13	5	+8	2	1	2	6	9	−3

Source: Ultimate NZ Soccer

==== Results by round ====
Round	1	2	3	4	5	6	7	8	9	10	11
Ground	B	A	H	A	H	A	H	A	H	A	H
Result	X	L	W	W	D	D	W	L	W	W	W
Position	6	10	9	6	5	5	3	6	5	3	2
Points	0	0	3	6	7	8	11	11	14	17	20

Source: Ultimate NZ Soccer
A = Away; H = Home; N = Neutral; W = Win; D = Draw; L = Loss; X = Bye

==== Matches ====
Win Draw Loss Fixtures

5 October 2025 2	Birkenhead United	3–0	Auckland City	Beach Haven
16:00 NZDT	Hughes 10'; Khan (yellow card) 36'; Preece (yellow card) 41'; Rostron (yellow card) 49'; Gray 73' (o.g.); Connor-McClean 90+1'	Report	Thorpe (red card) 29'; Gray (yellow card) 45'; Ellis (yellow card) 67'	Stadium: Shepherds Park; Referee: Michael Love

11 October 2025 3	Auckland City	3–2	Western Suburbs	Sandringham
14:00 NZDT	Bevan (penalty missed) 15'; Garriga 36', 67'; Yoo 45+2'	Report	Barton-Ginger 23'; Tipene-Clegg (yellow card) 59'; MacKenzie (yellow card) 90+2'; Brady (yellow card) 90+4'	Stadium: Kiwitea Street; Referee: Liam Weston

18 October 2025 4	Wellington Olympic	0–1	Auckland City	Island Bay
13:30 NZDT	Boyce (yellow card) 9'; Supyk (red card) 90+5'	Report	Gray (yellow card) 77'; Kilkolly 82'	Stadium: Wakefield Park; Referee: Isaac Trevis
Note: The match was originally scheduled to kick-off at 12:30, but was delayed an hour due to Auckland City's flight to Wellington also being delayed.

26 October 2025 5	Auckland City	1–1	Auckland FC Reserves	Sandringham
12:00 NZDT	Ilich (yellow card) 62'; Gray 88'	Report	Naidoo 47'; Burns (yellow card) 86'; Mitchell (yellow card) 89'	Stadium: Kiwitea Street; Referee: Anna-Marie Keighley

1 November 2025 6	Christchurch United	2–2	Auckland City	Christchurch
13:30 NZDT	Cole 13'; van Rijssel (yellow card) 30'; Stroud 37'; Beale (yellow card) 53'	Report	Yoo 56'; Garriga 82'	Stadium: Christchurch Football Centre; Referee: Sean Lau

8 November 2025 7	Auckland City	4–2	Auckland United	Sandringham
15:00 NZDT	Zeb 19'; Garriga 35'; Dalziell 39'; den Heijer (yellow card) 42'; Boxall (yellow card) 58'; de Vries 61'	Report	Olaoye 32' (pen.); Ananad (yellow card) 45+3'; Ingham (yellow card) 85'; Takahashi 90+2'	Stadium: Kiwitea Street; Referee: Caleb Downes

15 November 2025 8	Miramar Rangers	3–0	Auckland City	Miramar
15:00 NZDT	Bueno 27' (pen.); Ettema 31' (yellow card) 87'; Fenton 51'	Report	de Vries (yellow card) 23'; Garriga (yellow card) 24'; Murati (yellow card) 50'; Yoo (yellow card) 66'	Stadium: David Farrington Park; Referee: Chris Bennett

22 November 2025 9	Auckland City	2–0	Wellington Phoenix Reserves	Sandringham
14:00 NZDT	Boxall 11'; Ilich 60'	Report	Partridge (yellow card) 75'; Munro (yellow card) 88'	Stadium: Kiwitea Street; Referee: Ben O'Connell

30 November 2025 10	Western Springs	1–3	Auckland City	Western Springs
14:00 NZDT	Murati 17' (o.g.); Browne (yellow card) 70'; Drake (yellow card) 77'; Gatkek (yellow card) 88'	Report	Bevan 9' (yellow card) 87'; Boxall (yellow card) 17'; Yoo (yellow card) 29' (goal) 90+3'; Zhou 77'; Zeb (yellow card) 90+2'	Stadium: Seddon Fields; Referee: Cory Mills

6 December 2025 11	Auckland City	3–0	Coastal Spirit	Sandringham
14:00 NZDT	Ilich 57'; Gray 77'; Bevan 85'	Report		Stadium: Kiwitea Street; Referee: Charlie Tseng

==== Grand Final ====
13 December 2025	Wellington Olympic	2–2 (a.e.t.) (6–7 p)	Auckland City	Wellington
18:00 NZDT	Mata (yellow card) 77'; Vincent (yellow card) 87'; Stoupe 90+3' (yellow card) 108'; Prins 101'; Reynolds (yellow card) 105'	Report	Ellis 81'; Ilich (yellow card) 84'; Gray (yellow card) 96' (goal) 120+2'	Stadium: Newtown Park; Referee: Calvin Berg
	Penalties
	Mata (penalty scored); Prins (penalty scored); Mason-Smith (penalty scored); Davenport-Petersen (penalty scored); Solomon (penalty missed); Reynolds (penalty scored); Barclay (penalty scored); Davies (penalty missed)		(penalty missed) Ilich; (penalty scored) Zeb; (penalty scored) Ellis; (penalty scored) Kilkolly; (penalty scored) Gray; (penalty scored) Lobo; (penalty scored) Manickum; (penalty scored) Boxall

=== Chatham Cup ===
Win Draw Loss Fixtures

31 May 2025 Round 2	Onehunga Mangere United	0–4	Auckland City	Sandringham
14:00 NZST		Report	Lagos 3', 50'; Ellis 69'; de Vries 87'	Stadium: Kiwitea Street; Referee: Kirk Davis
Note: Although this match was played at Kiwitea Street, Onehunga Mangere were still considered the home side, as decided by the draw.

14 June 2025 Round 3	Auckland City	1–2	Waiheke United	Sandringham
14:00 NZST	Ellis 4'; Domfeh (yellow card) 16'; Fagan (yellow card) 42'; Martinez (yellow card) 66'	Report	Cabanal 39'; Sepúlveda Carvajal (yellow card) 85'; Timmins-Scanlon 87'; Herrera (yellow card) 88'	Stadium: Kiwitea Street; Referee: Tanvir Bhamji

=== OFC Men's Champions League ===
==== Group stage ====
Pos	Team	Pld	W	D	L	GF	GA	GD	Pts	Qualification
1	(New Zealand) Auckland City	3	2	1	0	4	1	+3	7	Knockout stage
2	(New Caledonia) Tiga Sport	3	1	1	1	5	5	0	4	Knockout stage
3	(French Polynesia) Pirae	3	1	1	1	2	2	0	4	
4	(Fiji) Rewa	3	0	1	2	3	6	−3	1	

Source: OFC

30 March 2025 1	Auckland City (New Zealand)	1–0	(French Polynesia) Pirae	Honiara, Solomon Islands
15:00 (UTC+11)	Manickum 41'; Boxall (yellow card) 67'	Report	Labaste (penalty missed) 70'	Stadium: Lawson Tama Stadium; Attendance: 2,000; Referee: Ben Aukwai (Solomon Islands)

2 April 2025 2	Auckland City (New Zealand)	2−0	(New Caledonia) Tiga Sport	Honiara, Solomon Islands
15:00 (UTC+11)	Manickum 25'; Zeb 90+4'	Report	Forest (yellow card) 88'	Stadium: Lawson Tama Stadium; Attendance: 1,635; Referee: Facundo Tello (Argentina)

5 April 2025 3	Rewa (Fiji)	1–1	(New Zealand) Auckland City	Honiara, Solomon Islands
15:00 (UTC+11)	Joseph (yellow card) 14'; Hughes (yellow card) 40'; Matanisiga (yellow card) 45+2'; Orobulu 90+5'	Report	Zeb 12'	Stadium: Lawson Tama Stadium; Attendance: 1,077; Referee: Norbert Hauata (Tahiti)

==== Knockout stage ====
===== Semi-final =====
9 April 2025 Semi-final	Auckland City (New Zealand)	2−0	(Vanuatu) Ifira Black Bird	Honiara, Solomon Islands
12:00 (UTC+11)	Zeb 25'; Bevan 86'	Report	Wohale (yellow card) 7'; Iawak (yellow card) 54'; Kaloros (yellow card) 56'; Tasip (yellow card) 63'; Kalotang (yellow card) 89'	Stadium: National Stadium; Attendance: 1,125; Referee: Norbert Hauata (Tahiti)

===== Final =====
12 April 2025 Final	Auckland City (New Zealand)	2–0	(Papua New Guinea) Hekari United	Honiara, Solomon Islands
18:00 (UTC+11)	Bevan 39', 83' (pen.); Zeb (yellow card) 51'; den Heijer (yellow card) 90+1'	Report	Joe (yellow card) 6'; Kepo (yellow card) 13'; Tamgol (yellow card) 72'	Stadium: National Stadium; Attendance: 6,000; Referee: Facundo Tello (Argentina)

=== FIFA Club World Cup ===
==== Group stage ====
Pos	Team	Pld	W	D	L	GF	GA	GD	Pts	Qualification
1	(Portugal) Benfica	3	2	1	0	9	2	+7	7	Advance to knockout stage
2	(Germany) Bayern Munich	3	2	0	1	12	2	+10	6	Advance to knockout stage
3	(Argentina) Boca Juniors	3	0	2	1	4	5	−1	2	
4	(New Zealand) Auckland City	3	0	1	2	1	17	−16	1	

Source: FIFA

15 June 2025 1	Bayern Munich (Germany)	10−0	(New Zealand) Auckland City	Cincinnati, United States
12:00 EDT	Coman 6', 21'; Boey 18'; Olise 20', 45+3'; Müller 45', 89'; Musiala 67', 73' (pen.), 84'	Report		Stadium: TQL Stadium; Attendance: 21,152; Referee: Issa Sy (Senegal)

20 June 2025 2	Benfica (Portugal)	6–0	(New Zealand) Auckland City	Orlando, United States
12:00 EDT	Carreras (yellow card) 45+4'; Di María 45+8' (pen.), 90+8' (pen.); Kökçü (yellow card) 48'; Pavlidis 53'; Renato Sanches 63'; Barreiro 76', 78'; Bajrami (yellow card) 87'	Report		Stadium: Inter&Co Stadium; Attendance: 6,730; Referee: Salman Falahi (Qatar)
Note: At 1:06 pm EDT, during the half-time break, the match was interrupted due to adverse weather conditions. The match was resumed at 3:20 pm EDT.

24 June 2025 3	Auckland City (New Zealand)	1–1	(Argentina) Boca Juniors	Nashville, United States
14:00 CDT	Gray 52'	Report	Garrow 26' (o.g.)	Stadium: Geodis Park; Attendance: 16,899; Referee: Glenn Nyberg (Sweden)

=== FIFA Intercontinental Cup ===
14 September 2025 First round	Pyramids (Egypt)	3–0	(New Zealand) Auckland City	Cairo, Egypt
21:00 EGY	El Karti 14'; Hamdy 74'; Ziko 85'	Report		Stadium: 30 June Stadium; Attendance: 4,157; Referee: Adham Makhadmeh (Jordan)

== Statistics ==
=== Appearances and goals ===
Includes all competitions.

No.	Pos	Nat	Player	Total		Northern League		National League		Chatham Cup		OFC Champions League		FIFA Club World Cup		FIFA Intercontinental Cup	
No.	Pos	Nat	Player	Apps	Goals	Apps	Goals	Apps	Goals	Apps	Goals	Apps	Goals	Apps	Goals	Apps	Goals
Goalkeepers:
1	GK	(New Zealand) NZL	Conor Tracey	10	0	6	0	0	0	0	0	3	0	1	0	0	0
18	GK	(Fiji) FIJ	Areya Prasad	5	0	4	0	0	0	1	0	0	0	0	0	0	0
24	GK	(New Zealand) NZL	Nathan Garrow	28	0	11	0	11	0	1	0	2	0	2	0	1	0
—	GK	(Uruguay) URU	Sebastián Ciganda	0	0	0	0	0	0	0	0	0	0	0	0	0	0
—	GK	(New Zealand) NZL	Reon Werahiko	1	0	1	0	0	0	0	0	0	0	0	0	0	0
Defenders:
3	DF	(New Zealand) NZL	Adam Mitchell	25	0	9	0	6+1	0	0	0	4+1	0	3	0	1	0
4	DF	(New Zealand) NZL	Christian Gray	34	6	18	2	11	3	0	0	1+1	0	1+1	1	1	0
5	DF	(New Zealand) NZL	Nikko Boxall	26	1	9	0	8	1	1	0	4	0	3	0	1	0
12	DF	(Kosovo) KOS	Regont Murati	21	0	7+3	0	6+2	0	1	0	0	0	2	0	0	0
13	DF	(New Zealand) NZL	Nathan Lobo	24	0	12+3	0	2+1	0	0	0	4	0	1	0	0+1	0
14	DF	(New Zealand) NZL	Jordan Vale	14	1	2+3	1	0+1	0	1	0	1+4	0	0+1	0	0+1	0
19	DF	(Republic of Ireland) IRL	Dylan Connolly	17	0	11+1	0	0	0	1	0	2+1	0	0+1	0	0	0
21	DF	(New Zealand) NZL	Adam Bell	13	1	6+2	1	0	0	0	0	2+1	0	1	0	1	0
22	DF	(China) CHN	Zhou Tong	17	2	3+4	1	2+2	1	0	0	3+1	0	1+1	0	0	0
23	DF	(New Zealand) NZL	Alfie Rogers	10	0	4+4	0	0	0	1	0	0	0	0+1	0	0	0
25	DF	(New Zealand) NZL	Michael den Heijer	23	0	6+1	0	6+1	0	0+1	0	5	0	2	0	0+1	0
29	DF	(New Zealand) NZL	Riley Dalziell	9	1	0	0	9	1	0	0	0	0	0	0	0	0
—	DF	(New Zealand) NZL	Mason Shaw	2	0	1	0	0	0	1	0	0	0	0	0	0	0
—	DF	(New Zealand) NZL	Niko Tarawa	1	0	0	0	0	0	1	0	0	0	0	0	0	0
Midfielders:
2	MF	(New Zealand) NZL	Mario Ilich	26	5	12	3	10	2	0	0	0	0	3	0	1	0
6	MF	(New Zealand) NZL	Jackson Manuel	14	0	7+5	0	0	0	1	0	0	0	0+1	0	0	0
8	MF	(Spain) ESP	Gerard Garriga	31	6	15	2	6+1	4	0	0	2+3	0	2+1	0	1	0
15	MF	(New Zealand) NZL	Jeremy Foo	21	2	13	2	3+4	0	0+1	0	0	0	0	0	0	0
20	MF	(New Zealand) NZL	Matt Ellis	30	5	7+6	3	3+6	1	1	1	1+3	0	0+2	0	0+1	0
26	MF	(New Zealand) NZL	David Yoo	36	8	13+4	5	11	3	0	0	4	0	3	0	1	0
30	MF	(New Zealand) NZL	Orlando Thorpe	5	0	0	0	1+4	0	0	0	0	0	0	0	0	0
32	MF	(New Zealand) NZL	Paris Domfeh	9	0	6+2	0	0	0	1	0	0	0	0	0	0	0
—	MF	(New Zealand) NZL	Sebastien Harris	1	0	0	0	0	0	0+1	0	0	0	0	0	0	0
—	MF	(New Zealand) NZL	Kaio Martinez	2	0	0+1	0	0	0	1	0	0	0	0	0	0	0
—	MF	(New Zealand) NZL	Manraj Singh	1	0	0	0	0	0	1	0	0	0	0	0	0	0
—	MF	(Samoa) SAM	Cayden Steffener	1	0	0	0	0	0	0+1	0	0	0	0	0	0	0
Forwards:
7	FW	(New Zealand) NZL	Myer Bevan	39	13	18+1	8	11	2	0	0	4+1	3	3	0	1	0
9	FW	(New Zealand) NZL	Angus Kilkolly	14	2	5+4	1	0+3	1	0+1	0	0	0	0+1	0	0	0
10	FW	(New Zealand) NZL	Dylan Manickum	27	3	5+4	1	3+5	0	1	0	4+1	2	2+1	0	1	0
11	FW	(New Zealand) NZL	Ryan De Vries	20	2	1+5	0	5+3	1	1	1	1+2	0	0+2	0	0	0
16	FW	(New Zealand) NZL	Joseph Lee	15	0	3+5	0	1+4	0	0+1	0	0	0	0+1	0	0	0
17	FW	(Colombia) COL	Jerson Lagos	29	3	10+6	1	2+1	0	1	2	4+1	0	2+1	0	1	0
27	FW	(Pakistan) PAK	Haris Zeb	30	6	12+4	2	4+2	1	0	0	3+2	3	1+1	0	0+1	0
—	FW	(New Zealand) NZL	Niko Clare	1	0	0	0	0	0	1	0	0	0	0	0	0	0
—	FW	(New Zealand) NZL	Santino Escolme	2	0	1	0	0	0	1	0	0	0	0	0	0	0
—	FW	(New Zealand) NZL	Carlos Stulich	1	0	0	0	0	0	1	0	0	0	0	0	0	0
—	FW	(New Zealand) NZL	Bond Tran	0	0	0	0	0	0	0	0	0	0	0	0	0	0
—	FW	(New Zealand) NZL	Kane Winstanley	1	0	0	0	0	0	0+1	0	0	0	0	0	0	0
Players who left during the season:
6	FW	(England) ENG	Kailan Gould	2	0	1+1	0	0	0	0	0	0	0	0	0	0	0
28	FW	(New Zealand) NZL	Otto Ingham	4	0	2+1	0	0	0	0	0	1	0	0	0	0	0
29	MF	(Japan) JPN	Kentaro Ozaki	2	0	1+1	0	0	0	0	0	0	0	0	0	0	0
31	FW	(New Zealand) NZL	Ryan Ellis	2	1	0+1	0	0	0	1	1	0	0	0	0	0	0
—	DF	(New Zealand) NZL	Jesse Gage	1	0	0+1	0	0	0	0	0	0	0	0	0	0	0
—	MF	(New Zealand) NZL	Samuel Fagan	1	0	0	0	0	0	1	0	0	0	0	0	0	0

- Source: Auckland City

=== Clean sheets ===
Includes all competitive matches. The list is sorted by squad number when total clean sheets are equal.

Rank	No.	Player	Northern League	National League	Chatham Cup	OFC Champions League	FIFA Club World Cup	FIFA Intercontinental Cup	Total
1	24	(New Zealand) Nathan Garrow	3	3	1	2	0	0	9
2	1	(New Zealand) Conor Tracey	1	0	0	2	0	0	3
Total			4	3	1	4	0	0	12

=== Disciplinary record ===
Includes all competitions. The list is sorted by squad number when total cards are equal. Players with no cards not included in the list.

No.	Pos.	Name	Northern League			National League			Chatham Cup			OFC Champions League			FIFA Club World Cup			FIFA Intercontinental Cup			Total		
No.	Pos.	Name	Yellow card	Second yellow card	Red card	Yellow card	Second yellow card	Red card	Yellow card	Second yellow card	Red card	Yellow card	Second yellow card	Red card	Yellow card	Second yellow card	Red card	Yellow card	Second yellow card	Red card	Yellow card	Second yellow card	Red card
17	FW	(Colombia) Jerson Lagos	2	0	1	0	0	0	0	0	0	0	0	0	0	0	0	0	0	0	2	0	1
21	DF	(New Zealand) Adam Bell	1	1	0	0	0	0	0	0	0	0	0	0	0	0	0	0	0	0	1	1	0
3	DF	(New Zealand) Adam Mitchell	0	0	1	0	0	0	0	0	0	0	0	0	0	0	0	0	0	0	0	0	1
22	DF	(China) Zhou Tong	0	0	1	0	0	0	0	0	0	0	0	0	0	0	0	0	0	0	0	0	1
30	MF	(New Zealand) Orlando Thorpe	0	0	0	0	0	1	0	0	0	0	0	0	0	0	0	0	0	0	0	0	1
5	DF	(New Zealand) Nikko Boxall	5	0	0	2	0	0	0	0	0	1	0	0	0	0	0	0	0	0	8	0	0
4	DF	(New Zealand) Christian Gray	2	0	0	3	0	0	0	0	0	0	0	0	0	0	0	0	0	0	5	0	0
7	FW	(New Zealand) Myer Bevan	4	0	0	1	0	0	0	0	0	0	0	0	0	0	0	0	0	0	5	0	0
2	DF	(New Zealand) Mario Ilich	2	0	0	2	0	0	0	0	0	0	0	0	0	0	0	0	0	0	4	0	0
8	DF	(Spain) Gerard Garriga	2	0	0	2	0	0	0	0	0	0	0	0	0	0	0	0	0	0	4	0	0
12	DF	(Kosovo) Regont Murati	1	0	0	1	0	0	0	0	0	0	0	0	0	0	0	0	0	0	2	0	0
25	DF	(New Zealand) Michael den Heijer	0	0	0	1	0	0	0	0	0	1	0	0	0	0	0	0	0	0	2	0	0
26	MF	(New Zealand) David Yoo	0	0	0	2	0	0	0	0	0	0	0	0	0	0	0	0	0	0	2	0	0
27	FW	(Pakistan) Haris Zeb	0	0	0	1	0	0	0	0	0	1	0	0	0	0	0	0	0	0	2	0	0
32	MF	(New Zealand) Paris Domfeh	1	0	0	0	0	0	1	0	0	0	0	0	0	0	0	0	0	0	2	0	0
11	FW	(New Zealand) Ryan de Vries	0	0	0	1	0	0	0	0	0	0	0	0	0	0	0	0	0	0	1	0	0
14	DF	(New Zealand) Jordan Vale	1	0	0	0	0	0	0	0	0	0	0	0	0	0	0	0	0	0	1	0	0
20	MF	(New Zealand) Matt Ellis	0	0	0	1	0	0	0	0	0	0	0	0	0	0	0	0	0	0	1	0	0
23	DF	(New Zealand) Alfie Rogers	1	0	0	0	0	0	0	0	0	0	0	0	0	0	0	0	0	0	1	0	0
—	MF	(New Zealand) Samuel Fagan	0	0	0	0	0	0	1	0	0	0	0	0	0	0	0	0	0	0	1	0	0
—	MF	(New Zealand) Kaio Martinez	0	0	0	0	0	0	1	0	0	0	0	0	0	0	0	0	0	0	1	0	0
Total			22	1	3	17	0	1	3	0	0	3	0	0	0	0	0	0	0	0	45	1	4

== Awards ==
=== Players ===
No.	Pos.	Player	Award	Source
4	DF	(New Zealand) Christian Gray	National League Team of the Season	
8	MF	(Spain) Gerard Garriga	National League Team of the Season	
10	FW	(New Zealand) Dylan Manickum	OFC Men's Champions League Golden Ball	
26	MF	(New Zealand) David Yoo	National League Team of the Season	
(New Zealand) Auckland City			OFC Men's Champions League Fair Play Award	
