= Steve Sumner Trophy =

Association football accolade

The Steve Sumner Trophy is a New Zealand National League award given to the player of the match in the New Zealand National League Grand Final each year. Introduced in 2018, previously the award was also given to the best player in the New Zealand Football Championship grand final. The medal is named after Steve Sumner, who played for New Zealand national football team in the 1970s and 1980s and was a member of the New Zealand squad that played in the 1982 FIFA World Cup.

== List of winners ==
Season/Year	Player	Club	Opponent	Ref
NZFC				
2018	(New Zealand) Callum McCowatt	Auckland City	Team Wellington	
2019	(New Zealand) Callum McCowatt	Eastern Suburbs	Team Wellington	
2020	Cancelled			
2021	(New Zealand) Andy Bevin	Team Wellington	Auckland City	
National League
2021	Cancelled			
2022	Not awarded			
2023	(New Zealand) Joel Stevens	Wellington Olympic	Auckland City	
2024	(New Zealand) Mario Ilich	Auckland City	Birkenhead United	
2025	(Pakistan) Haris Zeb	Auckland City	Wellington Olympic	

== Multiple winners ==
Trophies	Player	Team	Seasons
2	(New Zealand) Callum McCowatt	Auckland City / Eastern Suburbs	2018, 2019
