= Martín Bueno =

Uruguayan footballer (born 1991)

Martin Bueno
Personal information
- Full name: Martín Bueno Imbrenda
- Date of birth: July 19, 1991 (age 35)
- Place of birth: Montevideo, Uruguay
- Height: 1.92 m (6 ft 4 in)
- Position: Striker

Team information
- Current team: Miramar Rangers
- Number: 23

Senior career*
Years	Team	Apps	(Gls)
2012	Rampla Juniors	0	(0)
2012	Plaza Colonia	0	(0)
2013	Atenas	3	(0)
2014–2015	Cerrito	1	(0)
2015–2016	Durango	19	(5)
2016	Anahuac		
2017–2018	Gallico Catona		
2018–2019	Napier City Rovers	27	(45)
2018–2019	Hamilton Wanderers	16	(12)
2019–2020	Eastern Suburbs	18	(17)
2020–2021	Bellinzona	8	(4)
2021	Livorno	5	(0)
2021	Bellinzona	3	(0)
2021	→ Cerro Largo (loan)	9	(1)
2022	Fénix	12	(1)
2023	Eastern Suburbs	13	(10)
2023	CSM Alexandria	1	(0)
Medal record
Golden boot 2018 Central League Golden Boot 2020 Oceania Champions League Champion of Chatham Cup 2019 and Central League 2019
- * Club domestic league appearances and goals as of 10 August 2023

Martin Bueno (born 19 July 1991) is a Uruguayan footballer who plays as a forward for New Zealand Central League club Miramar Rangers.

== Club career ==
In 2018 he was a member of New Zealand's Central Premier League-winning Napier City Rovers team, winning the league's Golden Boot trophy as that year's top goalscorer. He was also a member of Napier's 2019 Chatham Cup winning team. Bueno won the golden boot of the 2020 Oceania Champions League, scoring six goals in three games representing Auckland-based side Eastern Suburbs.

On 4 February 2021 he moved to Italy and signed with Livorno.

== Honours ==
Individual

- Central League Top scorer: 2025
- New Zealand National League Top scorer: 2025
- New Zealand National League Team of the Season: 2025
