= Myer Bevan =

New Zealand footballer (born 1997)

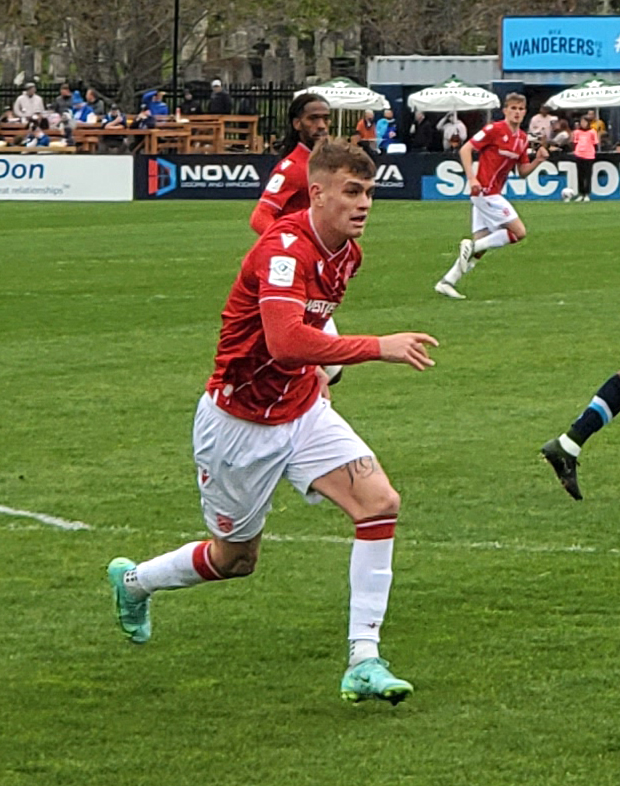
- Bevan with Cavalry in 2022

Personal information
- Full name: Myer Stefan Major Bevan
- Date of birth: 23 April 1997 (age 29)
- Place of birth: Auckland, New Zealand
- Height: 1.84 m (6 ft 1/2 in)
- Position: Forward

Team information
- Current team: Boeung Ket
- Number: 99

Youth career
- –2015: Western Springs
- 2015–2016: Auckland City
- 2016–2017: Nike Academy

Senior career*
Years	Team	Apps	(Gls)
2016	Auckland City	1	(0)
2017	Whitecaps 2	13	(3)
2018	Vancouver Whitecaps	0	(0)
2018	→ Husqvarna FF (loan)	8	(2)
2018	→ Fresno (loan)	7	(0)
2019	Western Springs	13	(7)
2019–2020	Auckland City	16	(15)
2020–2021	TS Galaxy	3	(0)
2021	Auckland City	2	(2)
2022–2024	Cavalry	36	(13)
2024–2025	Auckland City	29	(10)
2025–	Boeung Ket	23	(7)

International career^{‡}
2016–2017	New Zealand U20	9	(7)
2019	New Zealand U23	5	(12)
2017–	New Zealand	6	(2)
- * Club domestic league appearances and goals as of 9 November 2026 ‡ National team caps and goals as of 28 January 2022

Myer Stefan Major Bevan (born 23 April 1997) is a New Zealand professional footballer who plays as a forward for Cambodian Premier League club Boeung Ket and the New Zealand national team.

== Club career ==
=== Early career ===
Bevan played in his native New Zealand with Western Springs before moving to Auckland City, where he made his first-team debut on 28 February 2016, as an 86-minute substitute against WaiBOP United. In the summer of 2016, Bevan moved to the Nike Academy in England.

=== Vancouver Whitecaps ===
On 15 May 2017, Bevan signed with Canadian United Soccer League side Whitecaps FC 2. After one season with Vancouver's reserve side, he transferred to Vancouver Whitecaps' MLS team on 13 December 2017.

In 2018, Bevan moved to Sweden's third-tier on loan at Husqvarna FF. After making five starts, he returned to his parent club. Later that season, he went on loan in the USL with the Whitecaps' affiliate club, Fresno FC.

Bevan was released by Vancouver at the end of their 2018 season. He trained with A-League side Wellington Phoenix and later trialled with Polish side Puszcza Niepołomice in early 2019, but could not win a contract with either team.

=== Second spell at Auckland City ===
In 2019, Bevan returned to Auckland City, where he went on to score fifteen goals in sixteen games that season, winning the league Golden Boot.

=== TS Galaxy ===
Bevan joined South African Premier Soccer League side TS Galaxy in 2020.

=== Third spell at Auckland City ===
Bevan joined Auckland City in 2021 after being released by TS Galaxy.

=== Cavalry FC ===
On 28 January 2022, Bevan returned to Canada, signing with Canadian Premier League side Cavalry FC. He scored his first goal for Cavalry in the preliminary round of the 2022 Canadian Championship against FC Edmonton, first opening the scoring and then adding a penalty goal in a 2–1 victory. This result seemed to give his play a boost after a slower start to the season, and Bevan scored in both of his next two matches. In January 2023, Bevan signed a new two-year contract with Cavalry, with an option for 2025.

The 2023 season proved much more fruitful for Bevan, as well as Cavalry. Cavalry finished regular season champions, winning the CPL Shield. Bevan scored 11 goals, sharing the Golden Boot with Atlético Ottawa's Ollie Bassett, and also added four assists. Bevan would start the 2024 season by scoring Cavalry's first ever goal in the CONCACAF Champions Cup, during a 3–1 loss to Orlando City on February 27. After the series with Orlando, he returned to New Zealand and did not return to the club for the beginning of their league season, citing personal reasons, with the club placing him on the Inactive roster list. Later conflicting reports occurred with some sources stating his contract was eventually terminated by the club, while the club later released a statement saying he was "granted permission" to play at the amateur level in New Zealand by the club.

=== Fourth spell at Auckland City ===
In September 2024, he returned to Auckland City FC, appearing in his first match on 22 September 2024 in the first round of the 2024 FIFA Intercontinental Cup, also scoring in the match.

== International career ==
Bevan made his senior international debut for New Zealand in a 6–1 victory over Solomon Islands in a FIFA World Cup qualifier on 1 September 2017.

Bevan represented New Zealand at the 2019 OFC Men's Olympic Qualifying Tournament, scoring in all five matches for a total of twelve goals in five appearances.

== Personal life ==
Bevan holds Canadian citizenship, and loves poker.

== Career statistics ==
=== Club ===
As of 10 May 2026

Club statistics
Club	Season	League			Cup		Continental		Other		Total	
Club	Season	Division	Apps	Goals	Apps	Goals	Apps	Goals	Apps	Goals	Apps	Goals
Auckland City	2015–16	NZ Premiership	1	0	—		—		—		1	0
Whitecaps FC 2	2017	USL	13	3	—		—		—		26	8
Husqvarna FF (loan)	2018	Ettan	8	2	1	0	—		—		9	2
Fresno FC (loan)	2018	USL	7	0	0	0	—		—		7	0
Western Springs	2019	NRFL Premier	13	7	0	0	—		—		13	7
Auckland City	2019–20	NZ Premiership	16	15	—		3 (Note: Appearance in OFC Champions League)	2	—		19	17
TS Galaxy	2020–21	SA Premier Division	3	0	0	0	—		—		3	0
Auckland City	2021	NZ National League	2	2	0	0	—		—		2	2
Cavalry FC	2022	Canadian Premier League	10	2	2	3	—		2	1	14	6
Cavalry FC	2023	Canadian Premier League	26	11	1	1	—		3	0	30	12
Cavalry FC	2024	Canadian Premier League	0	0	0	0	2 (Note: Appearance in CONCACAF Champions Cup)	1	—		2	1
Cavalry FC	Total		36	13	3	4	2	1	5	1	46	19
Auckland City	2024	NZ National League	8	7	—		—		1 (Note: Appearance in FIFA Intercontinental Cup)	1	9	8
Auckland City	2025	NZ National League	30	10	0	0	5	3	4 (Note: Three appearances in FIFA Club World Cup; one appearance in FIFA Intercontinental Cup)	0	39	13
Auckland City	Total		38	17	0	0	5	3	5	1	48	21
Boeung Ket	2025–26	Cambodian Premier League	16	4	—		—		—		16	4
Boeung Ket	2026–27	Cambodian Premier League	0	0	0	0	—		—		0	0
Boeung Ket	Total											
Career total			119	49	4	4	10	6	5	1	138	60

=== International ===
As of match played 28 January 2022

Appearances and goals by national team and year
National team	Year	Apps	Goals
New Zealand	2017	2	1
New Zealand	2018	4	1
Total		6	2

Scores and results list New Zealand's goal tally first.

List of international goals scored by Myer Bevan
No.	Date	Venue	Cap	Opponent	Score	Result	Competition
1	5 September 2017	Lawson Tama Stadium, Honiara, Solomon Islands	2	Solomon Islands	1–0	2–2	2018 FIFA World Cup qualification
2	5 June 2018	Mumbai Football Arena, Mumbai, India	5	Chinese Taipei	1–0	1–0	2018 Intercontinental Cup

== Honours ==
Auckland City

- New Zealand Football Championship: 2019–20
- OFC Champions League : 2025
- National League: 2024, 2025

Individual

- New Zealand Football Championship Golden Boot: 2019–20
- OFC Men's Olympic Qualifying Tournament top scorer: 2019
- Canadian Premier League Golden Boot: 2023
