= Mario Ilich =

New Zealand football player

Personal information
- Full name: Mario Jozef Ilich
- Date of birth: 23 June 1995 (age 31)
- Height: 1.90 m (6 ft 3 in)
- Position: Midfielder

Team information
- Current team: Auckland City
- Number: 2

Youth career
- Central United
- –2012: Auckland City

Senior career*
Years	Team	Apps	(Gls)
2012–2014	Auckland City	3	(0)
2014–2015	Wanderers SC	12	(0)
2015–2016	WaiBOP United	14	(3)
2016	Eastern Suburbs	2	(0)
2017	Auckland City	2	(0)
2017	Central United		
2017–2019	Team Wellington	36	(2)
2019	Bentleigh Greens		
2019–	Auckland City	157	(15)
- * Club domestic league appearances and goals as of 21 November 2026

Mario Jozef Ilich (born 23 June 1995) is a semi-professional association football player from New Zealand who plays as a midfielder and captains National League club Auckland City.

== Club career ==
=== Early career ===
Growing up in Auckland, Ilich played his youth football for Central United and Auckland City.

Ilich spent time at a number of New Zealand Football Championship clubs, before spending a short spell at Bentleigh Greens in the NPL Victoria.

=== Auckland City ===
After leaving Bentleigh Greens, Ilich joined Auckland City, for the third time on 23 September 2019. He has since played in three international FIFA tournaments, the 2022 FIFA Club World Cup, 2023 FIFA Club World Cup, 2025 FIFA Club World Cup.

== Personal life ==
Ilich works as a supermarket sales representative for Coca-Cola. Ilich has Croatian roots.

== Career statistics ==
As of match played 9 May 2026

=== Club ===
Club	Season	League			National Cup		Continental		Other		Total	
Club	Season	Division	Apps	Goals	Apps	Goals	Apps	Goals	Apps	Goals	Apps	Goals
Auckland City	2011–12	Premiership	2	0	—		—		0	0	2	0
Auckland City	2012–13	Premiership	0	0	—		—		0	0	0	0
Auckland City	2013–14	Premiership	1	0	—		—		0	0	0	0
Auckland City	Total		3	0	0	0	0	0	0	0	3	0
Wanderers SC	2014–15	Premiership	12	0	—		—		—		12	0
WaiBOP United	2015–16	Premiership	14	3	—		—		—		14	3
Eastern Suburbs	2016–17	Premiership	2	0	—		—		—		2	0
Auckland City	2016–17	Premiership	2	0	—		1 (Note: Appearance in OFC Champions League)	0	—		3	0
Team Wellington	2017–18	Premiership	18	0	—		8	1	2 (Note: Appearances in New Zealand Football Championship play-offs)	0	28	1
Team Wellington	2018–19	Premiership	18	2	—		5	1	3 (Note: Two appearances; one goal in New Zealand Football Championship play-offs; one appearance in FIFA Club World Cup)	0	26	2
Team Wellington	Total		36	2	0	0	14	2	5	0	55	4
Auckland City	2019–20	Premiership	14	1	—		3	0	—		17	1
Auckland City	2020–21	Premiership	11	0	—		—		2	0	13	0
Auckland City	2021	National League	9	0	4	0	—		—		9	0
Auckland City	2022	National League	20	3	5	0	5	2	0	0	25	5
Auckland City	2023	National League	27	1	3	0	4	0	1 (Note: Appearance in FIFA Club World Cup)	0	32	1
Auckland City	2024	National League	26	2	3	0	2	1	1 (Note: Appearance in FIFA Intercontinental Cup)	0	32	3
Auckland City	2025	National League	22	5	0	0	0	0	4 (Note: Three appearances in FIFA Club World Cup; one appearance in FIFA Intercontinental Cup)	0	26	5
Auckland City	2026	National League	7	1	—		1	0	—		8	1
Auckland City	Total		136	13	15	0	12	3	6	0	164	15
Career total												

== Honours ==
Auckland City

- National League: 2024, 2025

Individual

- Steve Sumner Trophy: 2024
