= Nikko Boxall =

New Zealand footballer (born 1992)

Personal information
- Full name: Nikko Daniel Boxall
- Date of birth: 24 February 1992 (age 34)
- Place of birth: Auckland, New Zealand
- Height: 1.83 m (6 ft 0 in)
- Position: Defender

Team information
- Current team: Auckland City

Youth career
- Auckland City
- 2010: Central United

College career
Years	Team	Apps	(Gls)
2011–2014	Northwestern Wildcats	76	(7)

Senior career*
Years	Team	Apps	(Gls)
2015	Zweibrücken	13	(0)
2015–2016	VPS	40	(1)
2017	KuPS	31	(3)
2018–2020	Viborg FF	72	(2)
2020–2021	SJK	41	(3)
2022	San Diego Loyal	14	(0)
2023	Auckland City	0	(0)
2023	Wellington Phoenix	3	(0)
2023–2024	Inter Turku	9	(0)
2024	Eastern Suburbs	7	(0)
2025–2026	Auckland City	17	(1)

International career^{‡}
2011	New Zealand U20	1	(0)
2018–2022	New Zealand	6	(0)
- * Club domestic league appearances and goals as of 13 December 2025 ‡ National team caps and goals as of 06:32, 25 March 2022 (UTC)

Nikko Daniel Boxall (born 24 February 1992) is a New Zealand footballer who plays as a defender.

== Club career ==
Having started his career in his native New Zealand with both Auckland City and Central United, Boxall relocated to the United States in 2011 to study at the Northwestern University of Illinois. He joined the school's soccer team, The Wildcats, and won numerous accolades including Big Ten Defender of the year in 2014 and led the 'Cats to a Big Ten "Double" in 2011. He tallied 76 appearances in total, scoring 7 goals.

After leaving school, Boxall moved to Germany, and joined Regionalliga Südwest (level 4 in the German football league system) side SVN Zweibrücken. However, after the team withdrew from the league due to insolvency, Boxall moved to Finland and joined Veikkausliiga side Vaasan Palloseura.

After two seasons with VPS, Boxall agreed a contract with fellow Veikkausliiga side Kuopion Palloseura ahead of the 2017 season.

In January 2022, Boxall joined San Diego Loyal.

In February 2023, Boxall joined Wellington Phoenix until the end of the 2022–23 A-League Men season.

On 20 July 2023, Boxall returned to Finland to play for Inter Turku. He made a contract for the rest of the season.

On 14 March 2025, Boxall returned to Auckland City.

On 1 January 2026, Auckland City released Boxall.

== Personal life ==
Boxall is half Samoan and is the younger brother of New Zealand international footballer Michael Boxall.

== Career statistics ==
=== Club ===
As of 23 December 2025.

Club	Season	League			National Cup		League Cup		Continental		Other		Total	
Club	Season	Division	Apps	Goals	Apps	Goals	Apps	Goals	Apps	Goals	Apps	Goals	Apps	Goals
Zweibrücken	2014–15	Regionalliga Südwest	13	0	0	0	–		–		0	0	13	0
VPS	2015	Veikkausliiga	12	0	0	0	0	0	–		0	0	12	0
VPS	2016	Veikkausliiga	28	1	0	0	5	0	–		0	0	33	1
VPS	Total		40	1	0	0	5	0	0	0	0	0	45	1
KuPS	2017	Veikkausliiga	31	3	6	1	–		–		0	0	37	4
Viborg FF	2017–18	Danish 1st Division	14	0	0	0	–		–		0	0	14	0
Viborg FF	2018–19	Danish 1st Division	31	1	0	0	–		–		2 (Note: Appearances in the Danish 1st Division promotion playoffs)	0	33	1
Viborg FF	2019–20	Danish 1st Division	22	1	3	0	–		–		–		25	1
Viborg FF	Total		45	1	0	0	0	0	0	0	2	0	47	1
SJK Seinäjoki	2020	Veikkausliiga	24	3	3	0	–		–		–		27	3
SJK Seinäjoki	2021	Veikkausliiga	17	0	0	0	–		–		–		17	0
SJK Seinäjoki	Total													
San Diego Loyal	2022	USL Championship	14	0	2	0	–		–		–		16	0
Auckland City	2023	NZ National League	0	0	0	0	–		0	0	1 (Note: Appearances in the FIFA Club World Cup)	0	1	0
Wellington Phoenix	2022–23	A-League Men	3	0	0	0	–		–		0	0	3	0
Inter Turku	2023	Veikkausliiga	9	0	0	0	0	0	–		–		9	0
Eastern Suburbs	2024	NZ National League	13	0	2	0	–		–		–		15	0
Auckland City	2025	NZ National League	17	1	1	0	–		4 (Note: Appearance in OFC Champions League)	0	4 (Note: Three appearances in FIFA Club World Cup; one appearance in FIFA Intercontinental Cup)	0	26	1
Auckland City	2026	NZ National League	5	0	0	0	—		0	0	—		5	0
Auckland City	Total													
Career total			129	5	6	1	5	0	0	0	2	0	142	6

=== International ===
As of matches played 16 June 2019.

National team	Year	Apps	Goals
New Zealand	2018	4	0
New Zealand	2019	0	0
Total		4	0

== Honours ==
Auckland City

- OFC Champions League : 2025
- National League: 2025

Individual

- Veikkausliiga Player of the Month: July 2021
