= Gerard Garriga =

Spanish footballer (born 1993)

Personal information
- Full name: Gerard Garriga Gibert
- Date of birth: 28 May 1993 (age 33)
- Place of birth: El Morell, Spain
- Height: 1.76 m (5 ft 9 in)
- Position: Midfielder

Team information
- Current team: Auckland City
- Number: 8

Youth career
- Gimnàstic

Senior career*
Years	Team	Apps	(Gls)
2012–2017	Atlètic Alpicat		
2018–2019	Western Springs	36	(3)
2019–2021	Waitakere United	27	(6)
2021	Western Springs	8	(1)
2022–	Auckland City	99	(16)
- * Club domestic league appearances and goals as of 23 May 2026

Gerard Garriga Gibert (born 28 May 1993) is a Spanish footballer who plays as a midfielder for National League club Auckland City.

== Career ==
Born in El Morell, Tarragona, Catalonia, Garriga moved to Lleida in 2012 to study for a Physical education degree, and joined Segona Catalana side Club Atlètic Alpicat. He was a part of the squad which achieved promotion to Primera Catalana during the 2015–16 season, but was sidelined for most of the campaign due to an injury.

In 2017, after graduating, Garriga was planning on going to a trip to London to improve his English, but went on a trip to New Zealand instead, after a recommendation from Xavi Padrones, a former teammate. Initially as a tourist, he subsequently lived in a hostel and worked for a cleaning company before studying in an English school. In December 2017, as his English skills improved, he worked as a waiter.

In February 2018, Garriga signed for Western Springs after being recommended by Albert Riera. In October 2019, he moved to Waitakere United.

In 2021, Garriga returned to Western Springs after Waitakere was disbanded, but played rarely due to knee injuries. In 2022 summer, he joined Auckland City. He won four consecutive OFC Champions League editions with Auckland, being named MVP of the 2022 OFC Champions League final.

== Career statistics ==
As of match played 23 May 2026

Club	Season	League			National Cup		Continental		Other		Total	
Club	Season	Division	Apps	Goals	Apps	Goals	Apps	Goals	Apps	Goals	Apps	Goals
Western Springs	2018	NRFL Premier	20	2	—		—		—		20	2
Western Springs	2019	NRFL Premier	16	1	—		—		—		16	1
Western Springs	Total		36	3	—		—		—		36	3
Waitakere United	2019–20	Premiership	14	1	—		—		—		14	1
Waitakere United	2020–21	Premiership	13	5	—		—		—		13	5
Waitakere United	Total		27	6	—		—		—		27	6
Western Springs	2021	National League	8	1	0	0	—		—		8	1
Auckland City	2022	National League	20	1	0	0	5 (Note: Appearances in OFC Champions League)	3	—		25	4
Auckland City	2023	National League	20	4	0	0	6	0	2 (Note: One appearance in 2022 FIFA Club World Cup; one appearance in 2023 FIFA Club World Cup)	0	28	4
Auckland City	2024	National League	29	5	3	0	6	0	1 (Note: Appearance in FIFA Intercontinental Cup)	0	39	5
Auckland City	2025	National League	22	6	0	0	5	0	4 (Note: Three appearances in FIFA Club World Cup; one appearance in FIFA Intercontinental Cup)	0	31	6
Auckland City	2026	National League	8	0	0	0	—		—		8	0
Auckland City	Total		99	16	3	0	22	3	7	0	131	19
Career total			170	26	3	0	22	3	7	0	202	29

== Honours ==
Auckland City

- Northern League: 2022, 2023, 2024
- New Zealand National League: 2022, 2024, 2025
- Chatham Cup: 2022
- OFC Champions League: 2022, 2023, 2024, 2025

Individual

- New Zealand National League Team of the Season: 2025
