= Paul Posa =

New Zealand football manager (born 1983)

Personal information
- Full name: Paul Matthew Posa
- Date of birth: 24 October 1961 (age 65)
- Place of birth: Otematata, New Zealand

Youth career
- Henderson
- Eden
- Blockhouse Bay

Senior career*
Years	Team	Apps	(Gls)
- University
- Lynndale
- Central United

Managerial career
- Central United
- 2008–2009: Auckland City (caretaker)
- 2009–2010: Auckland City
- 2024: Central United
- 2025: Auckland City
- * Club domestic league appearances and goals

Paul Matthew Posa (born 24 October 1961) is a New Zealand association football manager who most recently managed New Zealand National League club Auckland City.

== Club career ==
Born in Otematata, Posa moved to Auckland with his family where he started playing football for Henderson. Posa also played for Eden and Blockhouse Bay at youth level. At senior level, Posa played for University, Lynndale and Central United.

== Coaching career ==
=== Central United ===
Between 1992 and 2000, Posa had various spells as head coach and assistant to Kevin Fallon and Ricki Herbert.

=== Auckland City ===
On 10 December 2008, Auckland City announced Posa would be their caretaker manager until the New Year, after previously coaching youth football at Central United. In January 2009, it was announced Posa would stay on until the end of the season.

In May 2009, Posa announced he would step down from his role at Auckland City following the 2008–09 OFC Champions League final.

In September 2009, it was announced that Posa had become permanent head coach of Auckland City following a caretaker spell.

=== Return to Central United ===
Posa spent a few seasons as head coach of Central United before returning to Auckland City.

=== Return to Auckland City ===
On 22 January 2025, Auckland City announced Posa would return for his second stint for the 2025 season.

Before heading off to the United States for the 2025 FIFA Club World Cup, City announced that Posa would miss the start of the tournament due to personal reasons. After missing the opening game due to a 'minor surgical procedure', Posa returned for the second group game against Benfica. On 24 June 2025, Posa managed City to a historic 1–1 draw with Argentine side Boca Juniors. This was their first non-defeated result since the 2014 edition.

At the conclusion of the 2025 season, Posa stepped down from his role at Auckland City.

== Personal life ==
Outside of football, Posa works as a dentist. He studied at the University of Otago, where he earnt a bachelor's degree in chemistry and mathematics before studying to become a dentist.

== Managerial statistics ==
As of as at 13 December 2025

Managerial record by team and tenure
Team	Nat	From	To	Record							
Team	Nat	From	To	G	W	D	L	GF	GA	GD	Win %
Auckland City (caretaker)	(New Zealand)	10 December 2008	3 May 2009	17	11	2	4	45	19	+26	64.71
Auckland City	(New Zealand)	19 September 2009	30 June 2010	25	15	7	3	53	27	+26	60.00
Auckland City	(New Zealand)	22 January 2025	15 December 2025	43	23	9	11	70	53	+17	53.49
Total				85	49	18	18	168	99	+69	57.65

== Honours ==
=== Manager ===
Auckland City

- NZFC Premiership: 2009–10
- NZFC Championship: 2008–09
- New Zealand National League: 2025
- OFC Champions League: 2008–09, 2025
