= Haris Zeb =

Pakistani footballer

Personal information
- Full name: Haris Ali Zeb
- Date of birth: 15 May 2001 (age 25)
- Place of birth: Palmerston North, New Zealand
- Height: 1.86 m (6 ft 1 in)
- Position: Winger

Team information
- Current team: Broadmeadow Magic
- Number: 6

Youth career
- –2018: Coastal Spirit
- 2018: Canterbury United Dragons

Senior career*
Years	Team	Apps	(Gls)
2017–2019	Coastal Spirit	+26	(15)
2018–2020	Canterbury United Dragons	21	(0)
2019	Western Suburbs	1	(0)
2020	Eastern Suburbs	7	(1)
2020–2021	Team Wellington	12	(1)
2021–2022	Miramar Rangers	24	(4)
2022–2023	Turun Palloseura II	0	(0)
2023	Christchurch United	19	(2)
2024	Birkenhead United	31	(2)
2025	Auckland City	30	(6)
2026	South Island United	17	(2)
2026–	Broadmeadow Magic	8	(1)

International career^{‡}
2025–	Pakistan	9	(0)
- * Club domestic league appearances and goals as of 6 September 2026 ‡ National team caps and goals as of 2 October 2026

Haris Ali Zeb (Urdu: حارث علی زیب; born 15 May 2001) is a professional footballer who plays as a winger for Broadmeadow Magic in the NPL Northern NSW. Born in New Zealand, he plays for the Pakistan national team.

== Club career ==
=== Early career ===
After playing youth football in Christchurch, Zeb moved to Wellington at age 10 to join an academy. Zeb moved back to Christchurch and eventually joined the Canterbury United Dragons youth side.

=== Canterbury United Dragons ===
Zeb made his debut for the first team on 6 January 2019 against Tasman United. Zeb went on to make eight appearances in his first season. The following season, Zeb made 13 appearances including his first start against Waitakere United on 16 November 2019.

=== Team Wellington ===
Zeb returned to Wellington, signing for Team Wellington for the 2020–21 season.

=== Miramar Rangers ===
Following the conclusion of the final New Zealand Football Championship season, Zeb signed for Miramar Rangers for the 2021 New Zealand National League.

=== Turun Palloseura II ===
While on trial Zeb broke a meta-tarsal so returned to New Zealand for surgery. In 2022, Zeb signed for Turun Palloseura II, but did not make a competitive appearance. In early 2023, he broke his meta-tarsal again, for the fifth time.

=== Christchurch United ===
Zeb returned to New Zealand, signing for Christchurch United.

=== Birkenhead United ===
Zeb signed for Birkenhead United for the 2024 season.

=== Auckland City ===
On 28 January 2025, Zeb signed for Auckland City for the 2025 Northern League.

In June 2025, Zeb was named in Auckland City's squad for the 2025 FIFA Club World Cup, the club's tenth appearance in the tournament. He played the final two group games including the 1–1 draw with Boca Juniors. This was their first non-defeated result since the 2014 edition. In doing so, Zeb became the first footballer of Pakistani origin to play in a FIFA Club World Cup event.

=== South Island United ===
On 18 December 2025, Zeb signed for South Island United in the newly founded OFC Professional League.

=== Broadmeadow Magic ===
On 15 June 2026, Zeb signed for Broadmeadow Magic for the remainder of the NPL Northern New South Wales season.

== International career ==
Zeb was called up to the Pakistan national team in 2023 for the 2023 Mauritius Four Nations Cup, but injury prevented him from making an appearance. He was also called up for the 2024 AFC U-23 Asian Cup qualifiers in 2023, but again missed out due to injury. Zeb has stated he wants to play for Pakistan. Zeb was again named for a squad in 2025 for the 2027 AFC Asian Cup qualifiers against Myanmar, but missed out due to Club World Cup duties with Auckland City. Zeb has said "If selected for future matches, I'll be available." In September 2025, Zeb was called up to the national team again for 2027 AFC Asian Cup qualification matches against Afghanistan. Zeb made his debut on 9 October 2025, coming on a half-time in the first of the two games against Afghanistan.

== Personal life ==
Born in northern New Zealand to Pakistani parents, Zeb moved to Christchurch at the age of two. As a semi-professional footballer, Zeb also worked as a delivery driver.

== Career statistics ==
=== Club ===
As of match played 6 September 2026

Appearances and goals by club, season and competition
Club	Season	League			National Cup		Continental		Other		Total	
Club	Season	Division	Apps	Goals	Apps	Goals	Apps	Goals	Apps	Goals	Apps	Goals
Coastal Spirit	2017	Mainland Premier	* (Note: Unknown how many appearances Zeb made.)	1	0	0	—		—		*	1
Coastal Spirit	2018	Mainland Premier	7	7	2	1	—		9 (Note: Seven appearances and three goals in Southern Football League; Two appearances in English Cup)	3	18	11
Coastal Spirit	2019	Mainland Premier	12	4	1	0	—		1 (Note: Appearance(s) in English Cup)	0	14	4
Coastal Spirit	Total		19*	12	3	1	0	0	10	3	32*	16
Canterbury United Dragons	2018–19	Premiership	8	0	—		—		1 (Note: Appearances in New Zealand Football Championship play-offs)	0	9	0
Canterbury United Dragons	2019–20	Premiership	13	0	—		—		—		13	0
Canterbury United Dragons	Total		21	0	0	0	0	0	1	0	22	0
Western Suburbs	2019	Central League	1	0	0	0	—		—		1	0
Eastern Suburbs	2020	NRFL Premier	7	1	0	0	—		—		7	1
Team Wellington	2020–21	Premiership	12	1	—		—		2	0	14	1
Miramar Rangers	2021	National League	21	4	5	1	—		—		26	5
Miramar Rangers	2022	National League	3	0	2	0	—		—		5	0
Miramar Rangers	Total		24	4	7	1	0	0	0	0	31	5
Turun Palloseura	2023	Ykkönen	0	0	0	0	—		1 (Note: Appearance in Ykköscup)	0	1	0
Christchurch United	2023	National League	17	2	1	0	—		2	0	20	2
Birkenhead United	2024	National League	31	2	5	2	—		—		36	4
Auckland City	2025	National League	22	3	0	0	5 (Note: Appearances and goals in OFC Champions League)	3	3 (Note: Two appearances in FIFA Club World Cup; One appearance in FIFA Intercontinental Cup)	0	30	6
South Island United	2026	OFC Pro League	17	2	—		—		—		17	2
Broadmeadow Magic	2026	NPL Northern NSW	8	1	0	0	—		—		8	1
Career total			179	28	16	4	8	5	19	3	219	40

=== International ===
As of 2 October 2026

Appearances and goals by national team and year
National team	Year	Apps	Goals
Pakistan	2025	3	0
Pakistan	2026	6	0
Total		9	0

== Honours ==
Western Suburbs

- Central League: 2019

Team Wellington

- New Zealand Football Championship: 2020–21

Miramar Rangers

- South Central Series: 2021

Christchurch United

- Southern League: 2023
- Chatham Cup: 2023
- English Cup: 2023

Auckland City

- OFC Champions League: 2025
- New Zealand National League: 2025

Broadmeadow Magic

- NPL Northern NSW Premiers: 2026

Pakistan

- Diamond Jubilee International Football Tournament: 2026

Individual

- Steve Sumner Trophy: 2025

== See also ==
- List of Pakistan international footballers born outside Pakistan
