= Noah Karunaratne =

Sri Lankan footballer (born 2003)

Personal information
- Full name: Noah Karunaratne
- Date of birth: 27 June 2003 (age 23)
- Place of birth: New Zealand
- Height: 1.76 m (5 ft 9 in)
- Position: Midfielder

Team information
- Current team: Eastern Suburbs
- Number: 10

Youth career
- –2021: Wellington Phoenix

Senior career*
Years	Team	Apps	(Gls)
2019–2023	Wellington Phoenix Reserves	46	(2)
2021	→ Lower Hutt City (loan)	16	(1)
2022–2023	Wellington Phoenix	0	(0)
2024–2025	Eastern Suburbs	42	(5)
2025	Christchurch United	1	(2)
2026–	Eastern Suburbs	0	(0)

International career^{‡}
2022–2023	New Zealand U20	8	(0)
2023	New Zealand U23	2	(0)
2026–	Sri Lanka	1	(0)
- * Club domestic league appearances and goals as of 27 September 2025 ‡ National team caps and goals as of 30 May 2023

Noah Karunaratne (Sinhala: නොවාහ් කරුණාරත්න) (born 27 June 2003) is a Sri Lankan footballer who plays as a Midfielder for National League club Eastern Suburbs and the Sri Lanka national football team.

== Personal life ==
Karunaratne is the older brother of Wellington Phoenix player Seth Karunaratne. He attended St Patrick's College

== Club career ==
=== Wellington Phoenix ===
Karunaratne played for the Wellington Phoenix Academy, before making his debut for the Wellington Phoenix Reserves in the 2019–20 New Zealand Football Championship against Tasman United picking up an assist. Karunaratne was named Wellington Phoenix Academy Men's Player of the Year for the 2022–23 season. On 3 August 2022, Karunaratne made his professional debut for the 'Nix first team, in an Australia Cup tie against Devonport City.

=== Eastern Suburbs ===
On 15 March 2024, Karunaratne signed for Northern League side Eastern Suburbs. He made his debut on 23 March 2024 against Bay Olympic in the Northern League.

=== Christchurch United ===
Karunaratne signed for Christchurch United on 26 September 2025 for the championship phase of the National League. He made his debut on 27 September 2025, where he scored both goals in a 2–0 win over Auckland United.

== International career ==
On 1 September 2022, Karunaratne was called up to the New Zealand U20's for the 2022 OFC U-19 Championship. He made his debut on 7 September 2022, in the opening group game against Cook Islands. On 1 May 2023, he was called up for the 2023 FIFA U-20 World Cup. Karunaratne made three appearances at the World Cup as New Zealand made the Round of 16.

Karunaratne was called up to the New Zealand U23's for the first time on 2 March 2023, for a two-game series against China. He played in both games, debuting on 23 March 2023.

== Career statistics ==
=== Club ===
As of match played on 27 September 2025.

Appearances and goals by club, season and competition
Club	Season	League			Cup		Continental		Others		Total	
Club	Season	Division	Apps	Goals	Apps	Goals	Apps	Goals	Apps	Goals	Apps	Goals
Wellington Phoenix Reserves	2019–20	Premiership	1	0	—		—		—		1	0
Wellington Phoenix Reserves	2020–21	Premiership	2	0	—		—		—		2	0
Wellington Phoenix Reserves	2021	National League	2	0	—		—		—		2	0
Wellington Phoenix Reserves	2022	National League	23	1	—		—		—		23	1
Wellington Phoenix Reserves	2023	National League	18	1	—		—		—		18	1
Wellington Phoenix Reserves	Total		46	2	0	0	0	0	0	0	46	2
Lower Hutt City (loan)	2021	National League	16	1	1	0	—		—		17	1
Wellington Phoenix	2022–23	A-League Men	0	0	1	0	—		—		1	0
Eastern Suburbs	2024	National League	21	1	2	0	—		—		23	1
Eastern Suburbs	2025	National League	21	4	4	2	—		—		25	6
Eastern Suburbs	Total		42	5	6	2	0	0	0	0	48	7
Christchurch United	2025	National League	1	2	—		—		—		1	2
Career total			105	10	8	2	0	0	0	0	113	12

== Honours ==
New Zealand U20

- OFC U-19 Men's Championship: 2022

Individual

- Wellington Phoenix Academy Men's Player of the Year: 2022–23
