= Sebastián Ciganda =

Uruguayan footballer (born 1993)

Personal information
- Full name: Sebastián Ciganda Herrero
- Date of birth: 30 August 1993 (age 33)
- Place of birth: José Enrique Rodó, Uruguay
- Height: 1.84 m (6 ft 1/2 in)
- Position: Goalkeeper

Team information
- Current team: Auckland City
- Number: 24

Youth career
- Talleres
- Fraternidad FC
- Santa Catalina

Senior career*
Years	Team	Apps	(Gls)
- Nacional
- Fénix
2017–2023	Waiheke United		
2023–2024	Auckland City		
2024–2025	Waiheke United		
2025–	Auckland City		
- * Club domestic league appearances and goals as of 12 July 2026

Sebastián Ciganda Herrero (born 30 August 1993) is a Uruguayan footballer who plays as a goalkeeper for New Zealand National League club Auckland City.

== Early life ==
Ciganda began playing football as a striker in his hometown of José Enrique Rodó with Talleres, before joining Fraternidad FC. In his second game there, he played as a goalkeeper as the team didn't have one.

== Career ==
Shortly before his 18th birthday, he went to Montevideo to train with Uruguayan club Nacional, but was rejected after a month. Afterwards, an acquaintance managed to get him to join Fénix, but Ciganda stopped going as he couldn't keep up with the training schedule while also studying journalism.

In 2016, at the age of 22, he moved to New Zealand after obtaining a working holiday visa, working in the kiwi harvest in a small town. While there, he got in contact with an Argentinian, who got him connected to football in the country, mostly playing at a local level with other Uruguayans. Shortly after, he moved to Waiheke Island, and began to play for Waiheke United, spending six seasons at the club.

In 2021, he helped Waiheke United win the NRFL Championship, earning promotion to the New Zealand National League. He remained with the club in 2022, after the introductions of a foreign-player limit. His performances that season caught the attention of Auckland City, who signed him in July 2023, although remained on Waiheke Island due to his job.

At Auckland City, Ciganda was the club's third-choice goalkeeper, making only one appearance for the club in a friendly prior to the 2023 FIFA Club World Cup. He was included in their squad for the tournament, but didn't make an appearance as they lost 3–0 in their only match to Al-Ittihad.

In 2024, he returned to Waiheke United. In June 2025, he returned to Auckland City, and was included in their squad for the 2025 FIFA Club World Cup.
