= 2025 New Zealand National League =

Football championship

New Zealand National League
- Season: 2025
- Dates: 15 March – 14 December
- Champions: Auckland City
- OFC Champions League: Auckland City
- Matches: 56
- Goals: 189 (3.38 per match)
- Best player: Owen Smith
- Top goalscorer: Martín Bueno (9 goals)
- Best goalkeeper: Adam Braman; Nathan Garrow (3 clean sheets each)
- Biggest home win: Western Suburbs 8–0 Coastal Spirit (5 October 2025)
- Biggest away win: Western Suburbs 2–7 Wellington Phoenix Reserves (7 December 2025)
- Highest scoring: Western Suburbs 2–7 Wellington Phoenix Reserves (7 December 2025)
- Longest winning run: 4 matches Miramar Rangers; Wellington Olympic; Western Springs
- Longest unbeaten run: 6 matches Auckland FC Reserves
- Longest winless run: 5 matches Christchurch United
- Longest losing run: 3 matches Auckland United; Coastal Spirit; Birkenhead United; Western Springs

The 2025 New Zealand Men's National League (known as the Dettol Men's National League for sponsorship reasons) was the fifth scheduled season of the National League since its restructuring in 2021; the 2021 National League was cancelled due to the COVID-19 pandemic in northern regions. 32 clubs compete in the competition, with four qualifying from the Northern League, three qualifying from the Central League and two qualifying from the Southern League for the National Championship phase. Auckland FC Reserves and Wellington Phoenix Reserves qualify automatically for the championship phase. Each team can field a maximum of four foreign players as well as one additional foreign player who has Oceania Football Confederation nationality. Over the course of the season, each team must also ensure players aged 20 or under account for 10% of available playing minutes.

The qualifying league fixtures were announced on 28 February 2025. The Northern League started on 15 March 2025 with the Central and Southern leagues starting on the 29 March. The Northern and Central leagues concluded on 30 August 2025 with the Southern League concluding on 31 August 2025.

== Qualifying leagues ==
=== 2025 Northern League ===
Northern League
- Season: 2025
- Dates: 15 March - 30 August
- Champions: Western Springs
- Relegated: Manurewa; West Coast Rangers
- Matches: 132
- Goals: 436 (3.3 per match)
- Top goalscorer: Michael Suski; Emiliano Tade; Morgan Wellsbury (14 goals each)
- Best goalkeeper: Ryan Foord; Oscar Mason (6 clean sheets)
- Biggest home win: Tauranga City 7–0 Manurewa (24 May 2025)
- Biggest away win: Manurewa 0–6 East Coast Bays (16 August 2025)
- Highest scoring: Manurewa 4–5 Auckland United (3 May 2025)
- Longest winning run: 6 matches Western Springs
- Longest unbeaten run: 10 matches Western Springs
- Longest winless run: 12 matches West Coast Rangers
- Longest losing run: 6 matches Manurewa

The 2025 Northern League is the 60th season, 5th season since the restructure of the leagues, of premiership football in the Upper North Island. The League started on 15 March and finishes on 30 August, with the top four side qualifying for the National League Championship along with the already qualified Auckland FC Reserves.

==== Northern League teams ====
Twelve teams are competing in the league – the top ten teams from the previous season, one team promoted from the NRFL Championship and Auckland FC Reserves. The promoted team is Fencibles United. It is both Auckland FC Reserves's and Fencibles United's first season in the National League. They replaced Melville United and Hamilton Wanderers (both relegated after a four-year Northern League spell).

Team	Home ground	Location	2024 season
Auckland City	Kiwitea Street	Sandringham, Auckland	1st
Auckland FC Reserves	Fred Taylor Park	Whenuapai, Auckland	New entry
Auckland United	Keith Hay Park	Mount Roskill, Auckland	5th
Bay Olympic	Olympic Park	New Lynn, Auckland	6th
Birkenhead United	Shepherds Park	Beach Haven, Auckland	4th
East Coast Bays	Bay City Park	Northcross, Auckland	9th
Eastern Suburbs	Madills Farm	Kohimarama, Auckland	3rd
Fencibles United	Riverhills Domain	Pakuranga, Auckland	1st in Championship (promoted)
Manurewa	War Memorial Park	Manurewa, Auckland	10th
Tauranga City	Links Avenue Reserve	Mount Maunganui	7th
West Coast Rangers	Fred Taylor Park	Whenuapai, Auckland	8th
Western Springs	Seddon Fields	Westmere, Auckland	2nd

==== Northern League personnel ====
Team	Manager	Captain
Auckland City	(New Zealand) Paul Posa	(New Zealand) Mario Ilich
Auckland FC Reserves	(Australia) Luke Casserly	(New Zealand) Codey Phoenix
Auckland United	(England) José Figueira	(New Zealand) Ross Haviland
Bay Olympic	(New Zealand) Peter Smith	(New Zealand) Callum McNeill
Birkenhead United	(England) Paul Hobson	(New Zealand) Dino Botica
East Coast Bays	(New Zealand) Joe Hall	(New Zealand) Louie Caunter
Eastern Suburbs	(New Zealand) Michael Built	(New Zealand) Jake Mechell
Fencibles United	(New Zealand) Rhys Ruka	(New Zealand) Jake Moosbally
Manurewa	(South Africa) Tashreeq Davids	(United States) Ryan Dougherty
Tauranga City	(Scotland) Barry Gardiner	(New Zealand) Campbell Higgins
West Coast Rangers	(New Zealand) Chad Coombes	(New Zealand) Robert Dymond
Western Springs	(England) Scott Hales	(New Zealand) Reid Drake

==== Northern League managerial changes ====
Team	Outgoing manager	Manner of departure	Date of vacancy	Position in the table	Incoming manager	Date of appointment
Eastern Suburbs	(Republic of Ireland) Brian Shelley (interim)	End of interim spell	27 November 2024	Pre-season	(New Zealand) Michael Built	27 November 2024
Manurewa	(New Zealand) Dylan Burns	End of contract	21 December 2024	Pre-season	(South Africa) Tashreeq Davids	21 December 2024
Auckland City	(Spain) Albert Riera	Stepped down	21 January 2025	Pre-season	(New Zealand) Paul Posa	21 January 2025
Auckland FC Reserves	Inaugural			Pre-season	(Australia) Luke Casserly	12 February 2025

==== Northern League table ====
Pos	Team	Pld	W	D	L	GF	GA	GD	Pts	Qualification
1	Western Springs (C)	22	13	3	6	44	30	+14	42	Winner of Northern League and qualification to National League Championship
2	Birkenhead United	22	12	5	5	55	33	+22	41	Qualification to National League Championship
3	Auckland United	22	12	4	6	47	32	+15	40	Qualification to National League Championship
4	Auckland City	22	12	4	6	35	24	+11	40	Qualification to National League Championship
5	Eastern Suburbs	22	12	4	6	35	27	+8	40	
6	East Coast Bays	22	10	6	6	32	27	+5	36	
7	Tauranga City	22	9	3	10	42	38	+4	30	
8	Bay Olympic	22	6	6	10	26	36	−10	24	
9	Auckland FC Reserves (Note: Auckland FC Reserves gain automatic entry into the National League Championship phase and cannot be relegated due to the A-League Men requirements.)	22	6	5	11	33	37	−4	23	Qualification to National League Championship
10	Fencibles United	22	5	6	11	37	49	−12	21	
11	Manurewa (R)	22	4	4	14	24	57	−33	16	Relegation to NRFL Championship
12	West Coast Rangers (R)	22	3	6	13	26	46	−20	15	Relegation to NRFL Championship

Source: NRF
Rules for classification: 1) Points; 2) Goal difference; 3) Goals scored; 4) Goals against; 5) Head to head; 6) Disciplinary record; 7) Coin toss
(C) Champions; (R) Relegated

==== Northern League results table ====
Home \ Away	AKC	AFC	AKU	BAY	BIR	ECB	EAS	FEN	MRW	TGA	WCR	WSP
Auckland City		0–1	1–0	1–0	2–1	2–0	2–1	1–1	5–2	2–1	2–1	0–1
Auckland FC Reserves	1–1		1–2	2–1	2–2	1–2	0–0	2–3	4–1	2–3	0–1	3–4
Auckland United	2–2	5–2		2–1	3–3	1–1	1–2	3–2	1–2	2–0	4–2	1–1
Bay Olympic	1–0	2–2	0–2		1–5	2–2	2–1	2–1	0–1	3–1	3–0	0–3
Birkenhead United	2–1	2–0	2–1	3–0		0–1	0–2	6–2	5–0	0–1	3–3	2–3
East Coast Bays	2–2	2–1	0–1	1–1	2–4		0–1	0–2	1–0	2–1	1–0	0–3
Eastern Suburbs	1–0	0–2	2–1	3–3	0–2	1–1		3–1	1–4	4–1	1–0	2–2
Fencibles United	1–2	1–1	1–3	1–0	3–5	1–2	1–3		2–2	3–1	1–1	4–3
Manurewa	0–1	0–4	4–5	1–2	0–0	0–6	0–1	2–1		3–3	2–3	0–3
Tauranga City	2–1	3–0	1–0	0–0	1–2	1–3	1–3	3–3	7–0		4–2	2–3
West Coast Rangers	2–5	0–1	1–5	1–1	3–3	1–2	1–2	2–2	0–0	0–2		1–2
Western Springs	1–2	2–1	1–2	3–1	2–3	1–1	2–1	2–0	2–0	0–3	0–1	

Source: Soccerway
Legend: Blue = home team win; Yellow = draw; Red = away team win.

==== Northern League scoring ====
===== Northern League top scorers =====
Rank	Player	Club	Goals
1	(United States) Michael Suski	Birkenhead United	14
1	(Argentina) Emiliano Tade	Auckland United	14
1	(New Zealand) Morgan Wellsbury	Tauranga City	14
4	(New Zealand) Colby Brennan	Tauranga City	11
4	(Canada) Guy-Frank Essome Penda	East Coast Bays	11
6	(New Zealand) Dylan Laing-McConnell	Manurewa / Fencibles United	10
7	(Ghana) Derek Tieku	Bay Olympic	9
8	(New Zealand) Myer Bevan	Auckland City	8
8	(New Zealand) Reid Drake	Western Springs	8
8	(New Zealand) Samuel Philip	Birkenhead United	8
8	(New Zealand) Ralph Rutherford	Auckland FC Reserves	8

===== Northern League hat-tricks =====
Round	Player	For	Against	Home/Away	Result	Date
8	(South Africa) Deandre Vollenhoven	Auckland United	Manurewa	Away	4–5	3 May 2025
9	(New Zealand) Samuel Philip	Birkenhead United	Fencibles United	Away	3–5	10 May 2025
10	(New Zealand) Alec Death	West Coast Rangers	Manurewa	Away	2–3	17 May 2025
13	(New Zealand) Matthew Ellis	Auckland City	Manurewa	Home	5–2	21 May 2025
11	(New Zealand) Morgan Wellsbury	Tauranga City	Manurewa	Home	7–0	24 May 2025
19	(New Zealand) Kian Donkers	Birkenhead United	Bay Olympic	Away	1–5	9 August 2025
20	(Canada) Guy-Frank Essome Penda	East Coast Bays	Manurewa	Away	0–6	16 August 2025

=== 2025 Central League ===
Central League
- Season: 2025
- Dates: 29 March - 30 August
- Champions: Wellington Olympic
- Relegated: North Wellington
- Matches: 90
- Goals: 398 (4.42 per match)
- Top goalscorer: Martín Bueno (19 goals)
- Best goalkeeper: Scott Basalaj (9 clean sheets)
- Biggest home win: Miramar Rangers 8–1 Waterside Karori (23 August 2025)
- Biggest away win: Waterside Karori 1–9 Wellington Olympic (28 June 2025); North Wellington 0–8 Miramar Rangers (12 April 2025); North Wellington 0–8 Wellington Olympic (26 April 2025)
- Highest scoring: Waterside Karori 1–9 Wellington Olympic (28 June 2025); Petone 7–3 North Wellington (19 April 2025)
- Longest winning run: 8 matches Wellington Olympic
- Longest unbeaten run: 11 matches Miramar Rangers
- Longest winless run: 10 matches North Wellington
- Longest losing run: 5 matches North Wellington

The 2025 Central League is the 29th season, 5th season since the restructure of the leagues, of premiership football in the Lower North Island. The League starts on 29 March and finishes on 30 August, with the top three side qualifying for the National League Championship along with the already qualified Wellington Phoenix Reserves.

==== Central League teams ====
Ten teams are competing in the league – the top nine teams from the previous season and the one team promoted from the 2024 play-off between the winners of the Central Federation League and the Capital Premier. The winner of the play-off was Upper Hutt City. This is their first season in the Central League, since New Zealand football's restructuring in 2021. They replaced Stop Out (relegated to the Central Federation League after two seasons in the Central League).

Team	Home ground	Location	2024 season
Island Bay United	Wakefield Park	Island Bay, Wellington	8th
Miramar Rangers	David Farrington Park	Miramar, Wellington	4th
Napier City Rovers	Bluewater Stadium	Napier	3rd
North Wellington	Alex Moore Park	Johnsonville, Wellington	9th
Petone	Memorial Park	Petone, Lower Hutt	7th
Upper Hutt City	Maidstone Park	Maidstone, Upper Hutt	1st in Capital Premier (promoted via play-offs)
Waterside Karori	Karori Park	Karori, Wellington	6th
Wellington Olympic	Wakefield Park	Island Bay, Wellington	1st
Wellington Phoenix Reserves	Fraser Park	Taitā, Lower Hutt	5th
Western Suburbs	Endeavour Park	Whitby, Porirua	2nd

==== Central League personnel ====
Team	Manager	Captain
Island Bay United	(Argentina) Martín Pereyra-García	
Miramar Rangers	(New Zealand) Kale Herbert	(England) Sam Mason-Smith
Napier City Rovers	(England) Bill Robertson	(England) Jim Hoyle
North Wellington	(New Zealand) Stu Pyne	(Canada) Gavin Hoy
Petone	(New Zealand) Jamie O'Connor	(New Zealand) Hami Paranihi-Nuku
Upper Hutt City	(New Zealand) Rory Fallon	
Waterside Karori	(New Zealand) Sam Morrissey	(England) Harry Fautley
Wellington Olympic	(Barbados) Paul Ifill	(Cook Islands) Ben Mata
Wellington Phoenix Reserves	(England) Chris Greenacre	(New Zealand) Dylan Gardiner
Western Suburbs	(New Zealand) Matthew Calvert	(Canada) Harry Fautley

==== Central League managerial Changes ====
Team	Outgoing manager	Manner of departure	Date of vacancy	Position in the table	Incoming manager	Date of appointment
Island Bay United	(New Zealand) Stu Jacobs	Sacked	1 July 2025	8th	(Argentina) Martín Pereyra-García	8 July 2025

==== Central League table ====
Pos	Team	Pld	W	D	L	GF	GA	GD	Pts	Qualification
1	Wellington Olympic (C)	18	16	1	1	64	14	+50	49	Winner of Central League and qualification to National League Championship
2	Miramar Rangers	18	12	3	3	53	22	+31	39	Qualification to National League Championship
3	Western Suburbs	18	10	4	4	57	24	+33	34	Qualification to National League Championship
4	Wellington Phoenix Reserves (Note: Wellington Phoenix Reserves gain automatic entry into the National League Championship phase and cannot be relegated due to the A-League Men requirements.)	18	8	5	5	44	26	+18	29	Qualification to National League Championship
5	Napier City Rovers	18	8	4	6	45	24	+21	28	
6	Island Bay United	18	5	4	9	32	32	0	19	
7	Waterside Karori	18	4	4	10	29	70	−41	16	
8	Upper Hutt City	18	3	5	10	20	50	−30	14	
9	Petone	18	4	1	13	20	47	−27	13	
10	North Wellington (R)	18	1	7	10	29	76	−47	10	Relegation to Central League 2

Source: Capital Football
Rules for classification: 1) Points; 2) Goal difference; 3) Goals scored; 4) Goals against; 5) Head to head; 6) Disciplinary record; 7) Coin toss
(C) Champions; (R) Relegated

==== Central League results table ====
Home \ Away	IBU	MRA	NCR	NWT	PET	UHC	WKA	WOP	WPX	WES
Island Bay United		6–2	1–6	3–3	1–4	1–2	7–0	1–5	1–5	1–0
Miramar Rangers	6–1		1–0	1–1	1–0	7–0	8–1	0–2	0–1	2–1
Napier City Rovers	5–0	3–0		1–1	2–1	1–1	4–1	1–1	1–1	2–3
North Wellington	3–3	0–8	2–1		2–2	1–2	2–2	0–8	2–3	0–5
Petone	0–1	0–6	0–3	7–3		3–4	1–2	2–3	4–5	1–5
Upper Hutt City	0–1	0–4	2–3	4–4	2–1		3–3	0–1	0–6	0–3
Waterside Karori	3–3	2–3	2–1	6–0	1–4	2–0		1–9	0–7	1–7
Wellington Olympic	2–3	1–0	1–0	7–0	3–1	6–1	5–0		3–0	3–1
Wellington Phoenix Reserves	4–1	1–2	2–0	5–0	1–2	4–0	2–2	0–3		0–2
Western Suburbs	1–2	2–2	2–3	6–2	3–2	5–0	6–1	0–1	2–2	

Updated to match(es) played on 12 April 2025. Source: Soccerway
Legend: Blue = home team win; Yellow = draw; Red = away team win.

==== Central League scoring ====
===== Central League top scorers =====
Rank	Player	Club	Goals
1	(Uruguay) Martín Bueno	Miramar Rangers	19
2	(New Zealand) Kieran McMinn	Petone	18
3	(New Zealand) Sebastian Barton-Ginger	Western Suburbs	12
3	(New Zealand) Hamish Watson	Wellington Olympic	12
5	(New Zealand) Sam Lack	Napier City Rovers	11
5	(New Zealand) Isa Prins	Wellington Olympic	11
7	(New Zealand) Kaelin Nguyen	Western Suburbs	10
8	(New Zealand) Jack-Henry Sinclair	Wellington Olympic	9
9	(England) Stephen Hoyle	Napier City Rovers	8
10	(Argentina) Nicolás Bobadilla	Miramar Rangers	7
10	(New Zealand) Ihaia Delaney	Waterside Karori	7
10	(United States) Tyler Freeman	Western Suburbs	7
10	(New Zealand) Sam Gates	Miramar Rangers	7
10	(New Zealand) Charlie Hale	Island Bay United	7

===== Central League hat-tricks =====
Round	Player	For	Against	Home/Away	Result	Date
3	(Uruguay) Martín Bueno (Note: Player scored 5 goals)	Miramar Rangers	North Wellington	Away	0–8	12 April 2025
4	(New Zealand) Kieran McMinn	Petone	North Wellington	Home	7–3	19 April 2025
5	(New Zealand) Joshua Rudland	Wellington Olympic	North Wellington	Away	0–8	26 April 2025
6	(New Zealand) Kaelin Nguyen	Western Suburbs	North Wellington	Home	6–2	3 May 2025
6	(Uruguay) Martín Bueno (Note: Player scored 4 goals)	Miramar Rangers	Island Bay United	Home	6–1	3 May 2025
10	(New Zealand) Kieran McMinn	Petone	Waterside Karori	Away	1–4	7 June 2025
12	(New Zealand) Isa Prins	Wellington Olympic	Waterside Karori	Away	1–9	28 June 2025
12	(New Zealand) Hamish Watson	Wellington Olympic	Waterside Karori	Away	1–9	28 June 2025
14	(United States) Tyler Freeman	Western Suburbs	Waterside Karori	Away	0–6	19 July 2025
15	(England) Stephen Hoyle	Napier City Rovers	Waterside Karori	Home	6–0	3 August 2025
15	(New Zealand) Kaelin Nguyen	Western Suburbs	North Wellington	Away	1–8	2 August 2025
16	(New Zealand) Luke Stoupe	Petone	Island Bay United	Home	5–0	9 August 2025
18	(New Zealand) Luke Supyk	Wellington Phoenix Reserves	Waterside Karori	Away	0–7	30 August 2025

=== 2025 Southern League ===
Southern League
- Season: 2025
- Dates: 29 March - 13 September
- Champions: Coastal Spirit
- Relegated: University of Canterbury
- National League Qualification: Coastal Spirit; Christchurch United
- Matches: 90
- Goals: 402 (4.47 per match)
- Top goalscorer: Garbhan Coughlan; Riku Ichimura (16 goals each)
- Best goalkeeper: Steven van Dijk (7 clean sheets)
- Biggest home win: Christchurch United 10–0; University of Canterbury (24 April)
- Biggest away win: Selwyn United 0–9; Christchurch United (18 April)
- Highest scoring: Cashmere Technical 8–4; University of Canterbury (24 May)
- Longest winning run: 8 matches Cashmere Technical
- Longest unbeaten run: 11 matches Cashmere Technical
- Longest winless run: 18 matches Selwyn United
- Longest losing run: 8 matches University of Canterbury

The 2025 Southern League is the 4th season of a full 10 team league, 5th season since the restructure of the leagues, of a South Island wide football league. The League started on 29 March and finished on 13 September, with the top two side qualifying for the National League Championship.

==== Southern League teams ====
Ten teams are competing in the league – the top nine teams from the previous season and the winner of the Southern League play-offs. The promoted team is Wānaka. This is their first season in the Southern League. They replaced FC Twenty 11 (relegated to the Canterbury Premiership League after their second season in the Southern League).

Team	Home ground	Location	2024 season
Cashmere Technical	Garrick Memorial Park	Woolston, Christchurch	1st
Christchurch United	United Sports Centre	Spreydon, Christchurch	3rd
Coastal Spirit	Tāne Norton Park	Linwood, Christchurch	2nd
Dunedin City Royals	Tahuna Park	Tainui, Dunedin	7th
Ferrymead Bays	Ferrymead Park	Ferrymead, Christchurch	5th
Nelson Suburbs	Saxton Field	Stoke, Nelson	4th
Nomads United	Tulett Park	Casebrook, Christchurch	6th
Selwyn United	Foster Park	Rolleston	8th
University of Canterbury	English Park	St Albans, Christchurch	9th
Wānaka	Recreation Centre	Wānaka	2nd in Southern Premiership League (promoted via play-offs)

==== Southern League personnel ====
Team	Manager	Captain
Cashmere Technical	(England) Dan Schwarz	(England) Tom Schwarz
Christchurch United	(New Zealand) Ryan Edwards	(New Zealand) Joel Stevens
Coastal Spirit	(New Zealand) Robbie Stanton	(New Zealand) Joe Hoole
Dunedin City Royals	(New Zealand) Blair Scoullar	(New Zealand) Jared Grove
Ferrymead Bays	(New Zealand) Alan Walker	(Republic of Ireland) James Deehan
Nelson Suburbs	(Northern Ireland) Ryan Stewart	(England) Lennon Whewell
Nomads United	(New Zealand) Matthew Jansen	(New Zealand) Caleb Cottom
Selwyn United	(New Zealand) Chris Brown	(New Zealand) Jayden Booth
University of Canterbury	(Uruguay) Ricardo Felitti	(New Zealand) Max McGuinness
Wānaka	(United States) Ben Sippola	(New Zealand) Jake Thompson

==== Southern League managerial changes ====
Note: Some cases use first/last match coached

Team	Outgoing manager	Manner of departure	Date of vacancy	Position in the table	Incoming manager	Date of appointment
University of Canterbury	(New Zealand) Ben Ellis	Mutual Consent	1 September 2024	Pre-season	(Uruguay) Ricardo Felitti	Before 29 March 2025
Wānaka	(Netherlands) Thomas van Hees	Stepped down	6 October 2024	Pre-season	(United States) Ben Sippola	Before 29 March 2025
Dunedin City Royals	(New Zealand) Richard Murray	Stepped down	29 October 2024	Pre-season	(New Zealand) Blair Scoullar	31 October 2024

==== Southern League table ====
Pos	Team	Pld	W	D	L	GF	GA	GD	Pts	Qualification
1	Coastal Spirit (C)	18	14	0	4	56	21	+35	42	Winner of Southern League and qualification to National League Championship
2	Christchurch United	18	12	4	2	66	13	+53	40	Qualification to National League Championship
3	Cashmere Technical	18	12	3	3	59	29	+30	39	
4	Nelson Suburbs	18	9	3	6	42	27	+15	30	
5	Nomads United	18	8	4	6	44	35	+9	28	
6	Ferrymead Bays	18	8	4	6	33	32	+1	28	
7	Dunedin City Royals	18	7	5	6	39	31	+8	26	
8	Wānaka	18	5	0	13	23	58	−35	15	
9	University of Canterbury (R)	18	1	2	15	20	78	−58	5	Relegated to Canterbury Premiership (Note: University of Canterbury were relegated after withdrawing from the 2026 Southern League.)
10	Selwyn United	18	0	3	15	20	78	−58	3	

Source: Mainland Football
Rules for classification: 1) Points; 2) Goal difference; 3) Goals scored; 4) Goals against; 5) Head to head; 6) Disciplinary record; 7) Coin toss
(C) Champions; (R) Relegated

==== Southern League results table ====
Home \ Away	CAS	CHU	CSP	DCR	FMB	NEL	NOM	SEL	UCF	WĀN
Cashmere Technical		2–2	4–2	3–3	3–2	3–0	3–3	6–0	8–4	4–1
Christchurch United	2–0		0–2	1–1	1–0	1–1	1–1	4–1	10–0	7–0
Coastal Spirit	0–3	2–1		5–1	2–0	3–0	4–1	4–0	2–0	6–0
Dunedin City Royals	2–3	0–2	0–4		2–2	2–0	3–4	3–1	5–0	1–0
Ferrymead Bays	0–3	0–5	3–1	2–2		1–0	1–1	1–1	4–2	2–1
Nelson Suburbs	2–0	0–4	2–0	1–1	4–1		2–2	5–0	7–1	2–1
Nomads United	2–3	2–4	2–4	0–2	1–2	3–0		2–1	1–0	4–1
Selwyn United	1–5	0–9	2–4	2–5	0–5	2–5	2–6		2–2	1–6
University of Canterbury	0–4	1–5	2–7	1–0	2–5	1–6	0–6	3–3		1–2
Wānaka	3–2	0–7	0–4	0–6	1–2	1–5	2–3	3–1	1–0	

Source: Soccerway
Legend: Blue = home team win; Yellow = draw; Red = away team win.

==== Southern League scoring ====
===== Southern League top scorers =====
Rank	Player	Club	Goals
1	(Republic of Ireland) Garbhan Coughlan	Cashmere Technical	16
1	(Japan) Riku Ichimura	Coastal Spirit	16
3	(South Africa) Lyle Matthysen	Cashmere Technical	14
4	(New Zealand) Flynn Holdem	Nomads United	12
5	(Japan) Shogo Osawa	Christchurch United	11
6	(New Zealand) Joshua Tollervey	Christchurch United	11
6	(New Zealand) Lennon Whewell	Nelson Suburbs	11
8	(New Zealand) Ben Polak	Nelson Suburbs	10
9	(Japan) Yuya Taguchi	Cashmere Technical	9
10	(New Zealand) Liam Cotter	Coastal Spirit	8
10	(New Zealand) Joel Stevens	Christchurch United	8

===== Southern League hat-tricks =====
Round	Player	For	Against	Home/Away	Result	Date
4	(Japan) Riku Ichimura	Coastal Spirit	Wānaka	Home	6–0	18 April 2025
8	(New Zealand) Pero Forman	University of Canterbury	Cashmere Technical	Away	8–4	24 May 2025
8	(South Africa) Lyle Matthysen (Note: Player scored 4 goals)	Cashmere Technical	University of Canterbury	Home	8–4	24 May 2025
9	(Japan) Shogo Osawa	Christchurch United	Wānaka	Home	7–0	7 June 2025
10	(Japan) Yuya Taguchi	Cashmere Technical	Selwyn United	Home	6–0	21 June 2025
12	(New Zealand) Flynn Holdem	Nomads United	Dunedin City Royals	Away	3–4	12 July 2025
12	(United States) Trevin Myers	Nelson Suburbs	University of Canterbury	Away	1–6	12 July 2025
14	(New Zealand) Jackson Cole	Christchurch United	University of Canterbury	Away	1–5	2 August 2025
14	(New Zealand) Anthony Sprowson	Wānaka	Selwyn United	Away	1–6	2 August 2025
16	(New Zealand) Flynn Holdem	Nomads United	Selwyn United	Away	2–6	16 August 2025
18	(Japan) Shogo Osawa	Christchurch United	Wānaka	Away	0–7	31 August 2025
18	(New Zealand) Ben Polak	Nelson Suburbs	Selwyn United	Away	2–5	31 August 2025
18	(New Zealand) Ben Polak	Nelson Suburbs	Wānaka	Away	1–5	13 September 2025

===== Southern League own goals =====
Round	Player	Club	H/A	Time	Goal	Result	Opponent	Date
4	(Republic of Ireland) Danny Kane	Cashmere Technical	Home	7'	1–1	3–3	Nomads United	18 April 2025
4	(New Zealand) Scott McKay	Selwyn United	Home	39'	0–4	0–9	Christchurch United	18 April 2025
5	(New Zealand) Stuart Campbell	University of Canterbury	Away	13'	2–0	10–0	Christchurch United	24 April 2025
13	(New Zealand) Matthew Aitchison	University of Canterbury	Away	27'	2–0	4–2	Ferrymead Bays	19 July 2025
13	(New Zealand) Connor Neil	Dunedin City Royals	Away	89'	1–1	1–1	Nelson Suburbs	20 July 2025
14	(New Zealand) Guy Reeves	Nomads United	Away	44'	3–1	4–1	Coastal Spirit	3 August 2025
15	(New Zealand) Oliver Cosgrove	Selwyn United	Home	62'	1–2	3–3	University of Canterbury	9 August 2025
15	(New Zealand) Matthew Aitchison	University of Canterbury	Away	90+5'	3–3	3–3	Selwyn United	9 August 2025
15	(New Zealand) Ryan Hamilton	Wānaka	Away	65'	2–0	4–1	Nomads United	9 August 2025
17	(New Zealand) Carter Smith	University of Canterbury	Home	62'	0–4	0–4	Cashmere Technical	23 August 2025
18	(New Zealand) Michael Johnson	Wānaka	Home	86'	0–6	0–7	Christchurch United	31 August 2025
18	(New Zealand) Michael Johnson	Wānaka	Home	90+2'	0–7	0–7	Christchurch United	31 August 2025

== Qualified clubs ==
There are 11 men's National League Championship qualifying spots (4 plus Auckland FC Reserves for the Northern League, 3 plus Wellington Phoenix Reserves for the Central League and 2 for the Southern League).

Location of clubs in New Zealand for the 2025 National League season
Location of clubs in Auckland Region for the 2025 National League season
Location of clubs in Wellington Region for the 2025 National League season

Association	Team	Position in Regional League	App (last)	Previous best (last)
Northern League (4 berths)	Western Springs	1st	2nd (2024)	3rd (2024)
Northern League (4 berths)	Birkenhead United	2nd	3rd (2024)	1st (Note: Birkenhead finished first in the 2024 season, but lost the grand final.) (2024)
Northern League (4 berths)	Auckland United	3rd	3rd (2023)	3rd (2022)
Northern League (4 berths)	Auckland City	4th	4th (2024)	1st (Note: Auckland City finished second in the 2024 season, but won the grand final.) (2022)
Central League (3 berths)	Wellington Olympic	1st	4th (2024)	1st (2023)
Central League (3 berths)	Miramar Rangers	2nd	2nd (2022)	10th (2022)
Central League (3 berths)	Western Suburbs	3rd	2nd (2024)	10th (2024)
Southern League (2 berths)	Coastal Spirit	1st	2nd (2024)	7th (2024)
Southern League (2 berths)	Christchurch United	2nd	3rd (2023)	3rd (2023)
Auckland FC (automatic berth)	Auckland FC Reserves	Automatic qualification	1st	Debut
Wellington Phoenix (automatic berth)	Wellington Phoenix Reserves	Automatic qualification	4th (2024)	5th (2024)

=== Location ===
Team	Home ground	Location	2024 season
Auckland City	Kiwitea Street	Sandringham, Auckland	1st
Auckland FC Reserves	Fred Taylor Park	Whenuapai, Auckland	—N/a
Auckland United	Keith Hay Park	Mount Roskill, Auckland	—N/a
Birkenhead United	Shepherds Park	Beach Haven, Auckland	1st
Christchurch United	United Sports Centre (Note: Played one game at English Park in St Albans.)	Spreydon, Christchurch	—N/a
Coastal Spirit	Linfield Park	Bromley, Christchurch	7th
Miramar Rangers	David Farrington Park	Miramar, Wellington	—N/a
Wellington Olympic	Wakefield Park	Island Bay, Wellington	6th
Wellington Phoenix Reserves	Fraser Park	Taitā, Lower Hutt	5th
Western Springs	Seddon Fields	Westmere, Auckland	3rd
Western Suburbs	Endeavour Park (Note: Played one game at Alex Moore Park in Johnsonville.)	Whitby, Porirua	10th

=== Personnel ===
Team	Manager	Captain
Auckland City	(New Zealand) Paul Posa	(New Zealand) Mario Ilich
Auckland FC Reserves	(Australia) Luke Casserly	(New Zealand) Codey Phoenix
Auckland United	(England) José Figueira	(New Zealand) Ross Haviland
Birkenhead United	(England) Paul Hobson	(New Zealand) Dino Botica
Christchurch United	(New Zealand) Ryan Edwards	(New Zealand) Joel Stevens
Coastal Spirit	(New Zealand) Robbie Stanton	(New Zealand) Joe Hoole
Miramar Rangers	(New Zealand) Kale Herbet	(England) Brad Whitworth
Wellington Olympic	(Barbados) Paul Ifill	(Cook Islands) Ben Mata
Wellington Phoenix Reserves	(England) Chris Greenacre	(New Zealand) Isaac Hughes
Western Springs	(England) Scott Hales	(New Zealand) Reid Drake
Western Suburbs	(New Zealand) Matthew Calvert	(Canada) Harry Fautley

== Championship phase ==
=== League table ===
Pos	Team	Pld	W	D	L	GF	GA	GD	Pts	Qualification
1	Wellington Olympic	10	7	0	3	23	14	+9	21	Qualification to Grand Final
2	Auckland City (C)	10	6	2	2	19	14	+5	20	Qualification to Grand Final and Champions League group stage
3	Miramar Rangers	10	6	1	3	25	14	+11	19	
4	Auckland FC Reserves (Note: Auckland FC Reserves and Wellington Phoenix Reserves can not qualify for the Grand Final.)	10	5	3	2	17	10	+7	18	
5	Western Springs	10	5	1	4	16	13	+3	16	
6	Birkenhead United	10	5	0	5	20	21	−1	15	
7	Christchurch United	10	4	2	4	16	19	−3	14	
8	Western Suburbs	10	3	1	6	19	21	−2	10	
9	Wellington Phoenix Reserves	10	3	1	6	18	21	−3	10	
10	Auckland United	10	2	2	6	11	19	−8	8	
11	Coastal Spirit	10	2	1	7	5	23	−18	7	

Source: New Zealand Football
Rules for classification: 1) Points; 2) Goal difference; 3) Goals for; 4) Goals against; 5) Head to head; 6) Disciplinary record
(C) Champions

=== Results table ===
Home \ Away	AKC	AFC	AKU	BIR	CHU	CSP	MRA	WOP	WPX	WSP	WES
Auckland City		1–1	4–2			3–0			2–0		3–2
Auckland FC Reserves			3–0	3–0		0–1		2–1	2–1		
Auckland United				3–2	0–2	3–0		0–3	0–0		
Birkenhead United	3–0				3–0		1–4	2–4		3–1	
Christchurch United	2–2	1–4					4–2			1–2	3–1
Coastal Spirit				1–2	0–0		1–3	1–3		1–0	
Miramar Rangers	3–0	3–0	2–2							1–2	2–1
Wellington Olympic	0–1				2–3		2–1			2–1	1–0
Wellington Phoenix Reserves				2–3	3–0	1–0	1–4	3–5			
Western Springs	1–3	1–1	2–1						3–0		3–0
Western Suburbs		1–1	1–0	3–1		8–0			2–7		

Source: New Zealand Football
Legend: Blue = home team win; Yellow = draw; Red = away team win.

==== Positions by round ====
The table lists the positions of teams after each week of matches. To preserve chronological evolvements, any postponed matches are not included in the round at which they were originally scheduled, but added to the full round they were played immediately afterwards. For example, if a match is scheduled for round 3, but then postponed and played between rounds 6 and 7, it is added to the standings for round 6.

Team ╲ Round	1	2	3	4	5	6	7	8	9	10	11
Wellington Olympic	3	3	1	1	1	1	2	2	3	2	1
Auckland City	6	10	9	6	5	5	3	6	5	3	2
Miramar Rangers	1	6	5	7	3	6	4	3	1	1	3
Auckland FC Reserves	10	7	6	9	8	4	6	4	6	5	4
Western Springs	1	5	4	2	2	2	1	1	2	4	5
Birkenhead United	5	2	2	4	7	8	5	7	8	7	6
Christchurch United	4	1	3	5	4	3	7	5	4	6	7
Western Suburbs	10	4	7	3	6	7	8	9	7	8	8
Wellington Phoenix Reserves	8	9	8	8	9	10	10	10	10	10	9
Auckland United	9	8	10	11	11	9	9	8	9	9	10
Coastal Spirit	7	11	11	10	10	11	11	11	11	11	11

Grand Final

Source: New Zealand Football

=== Grand Final ===
13 December 2025
18:00 NZDT

Wellington Olympic	2–2 (a.e.t.)	Auckland City
Stoupe 90+3'; Prins 101'	Report	Ellis 81'; Gray 120+2'
Penalties
Mata (penalty scored); Prins (penalty scored); Mason-Smith (penalty scored); Davenport-Petersen (penalty scored); Solomon (penalty missed); Reynolds (penalty scored); Barclay (penalty scored); Davies (penalty missed)	6–7	(penalty missed) Ilich; (penalty scored) Zeb; (penalty scored) Ellis; (penalty scored) Kilkolly; (penalty scored) Gray; (penalty scored) Lobo; (penalty scored) Manickum; (penalty scored) Boxall

Newtown Park, Wellington
Referee: Calvin Berg

== Statistics ==
=== Top scorers ===
Rank	Player	Club	Goals
1	(Uruguay) Martín Bueno	Miramar Rangers	9
2	(New Zealand) Sebastian Barton-Ginger	Western Suburbs	5
2	(New Zealand) Gianni Bouzoukis	Wellington Olympic	5
2	(New Zealand) Isa Prins	Wellington Olympic	5
2	(New Zealand) Jack-Henry Sinclair	Wellington Olympic	5
6	(New Zealand) Jonty Bidois	Auckland FC Reserves	4
6	(New Zealand) Reid Drake	Western Springs	4
6	(Spain) Gerard Garriga	Auckland City	4
6	(New Zealand) Dejaun Naidoo	Auckland FC Reserves	4
6	(New Zealand) Kaelin Nguyen	Western Suburbs	4
6	(Japan) Shogo Osawa	Christchurch United	4

=== Hat-tricks ===
Round	Player	For	Against	Home/Away	Result	Date
2	(New Zealand) Kaelin Nguyen (Note: Player scored 4 goals)	Western Suburbs	Coastal Spirit	Home	8–0	5 October 2025

=== Clean sheets ===
Rank	Player	Club	Clean sheets
1	(United States) Adam Braman	Coastal Spirit	3
1	(New Zealand) Nathan Garrow	Auckland City	3
3	(New Zealand) Scott Basalaj	Wellington Olympic	2
3	(Cook Islands) Emmett Connolly	Western Springs	2
3	(New Zealand) Kai McLean	Auckland United	2
3	(Guyana) Quillan Roberts	Western Suburbs	2
3	(Netherlands) Steven van Dijk	Christchurch United	2
8	(New Zealand) Jack De Groot	Miramar Rangers	1
8	(New Zealand) Matt Foord	Wellington Phoenix Reserves	1
8	(Canada) Jackson Gardner	Birkenhead United	1
8	(New Zealand) Eli Jones	Auckland FC Reserves	1
8	(New Zealand) Alby Kelly-Heald	Wellington Phoenix Reserves	1
8	(New Zealand) Eamonn McCarron	Wellington Phoenix Reserves	1
8	(New Zealand) Matt Oliver	Miramar Rangers	1
8	(New Zealand) Oli Sail	Auckland FC Reserves	1
8	(New Zealand) Keegan Smith	Birkenhead United	1

== Awards ==
=== Goal of the Week ===
Regional Phase

Goal of the Week
Week	Player	Club	Ref.
1	(Cambodia) Lucca Lim	Auckland United	
2	(New Zealand) Ben Polak	Nelson Suburbs	
3	(New Zealand) Ilan Mastrocola-Simon	Nelson Suburbs	
4	(United States) Michael Suski	Birkenhead United	
5	(Canada) Rohun Kawale	Birkenhead United	
6	(New Zealand) Anas Zara	Manurewa	
7	(New Zealand) Bray Whitecliffe	Petone	
8	(New Zealand) Max Chrétien	Napier City Rovers	
9	(England) Lennon Whewell	Nelson Suburbs	
10	(United States) Evan Paez	Manurewa	
11	(New Zealand) Noah Karunaratne	Eastern Suburbs	
12	(New Zealand) Curtis Hughes	Birkenhead United	
13	(New Zealand) Benjamin Perez Baldoni	Auckland FC Reserves	
14	(United States) Ryan Dougherty	Manurewa	
15	Round 4 of Chatham Cup's goals won		
16	(New Zealand) Fletcher Pratt	North Wellington	
17	(Ghana) Derek Tieku	Bay Olympic	
18	(New Zealand) Benjamin Perez Baldoni	Bay Olympic	
19	(United States) Evan Paez	Manurewa	
20	(United States) Michael Suski	Birkenhead United	
21	(Japan) Riku Ichimura	Coastal Spirit	
22	(New Zealand) Ben Polak	Nelson Suburbs	

Championship Phase

Goal of the Week
Week	Player	Club	Ref.
1	(New Zealand) Noah Karunaratne	Christchurch United	
2	(New Zealand) Sebastian Barton-Ginger (Note: Sebastian Barton-Ginger's both goals won the award)	Western Suburbs	
3	(New Zealand) Max Chrétien	Coastal Spirit	
4	(New Zealand) Harry Newbould	Birkenhead United	
5	(New Zealand) Tor Davenport-Petersen	Wellington Olympic	
6	(New Zealand) Matthew Conroy	Auckland United	
7	(Pakistan) Haris Zeb	Auckland City	
8	(New Zealand) Finn McKenlay	Auckland FC Reserves	
9	(New Zealand) Isaac Bates	Birkenhead United	
10	(New Zealand) Nicholas Gaze	Auckland FC Reserves	

=== Player of the Week ===
Player of the Week
Week	Player	Club	Ref.
1	(New Zealand) Noah Karunaratne	Christchurch United	
2	(New Zealand) Kaelin Nguyen	Western Suburbs	
3	(Spain) Gerard Garriga	Auckland City	
4	(Japan) Toshiki Makimoto	Western Springs	
5	(New Zealand) Jack-Henry Sinclair	Wellington Olympic	
6	(New Zealand) Jonty Bidois	Auckland FC Reserves	
7	(Uruguay) Martín Bueno	Miramar Rangers	
8	(Japan) Shogo Osawa	Christchurch United	
9	(New Zealand) Joel Stevens	Christchurch United	
10	(Uruguay) Martín Bueno	Miramar Rangers	

=== Annual awards ===
League	MVP	Club	Top scorer	Club
Northern League	(Ghana) Derek Tieku	Bay Olympic	(United States) Michael Suski (Argentina) Emiliano Tade (New Zealand) Morgan Wellsbury	Birkenhead United; Auckland United; Tauranga City
Central League	(New Zealand) Sam Lack	Napier City Rovers	(Uruguay) Martín Bueno	Miramar Rangers
Southern League	(Japan) Riku Ichimura	Coastal Spirit	(Republic of Ireland) Garbhan Coughlan (Japan) Riku Ichimura	Cashmere Technical; Coastal Spirit
National League	(New Zealand) Owen Smith	Miramar Rangers	(Uruguay) Martín Bueno	Miramar Rangers

Team of the season
Goalkeeper	(Cook Islands) Emmett Connolly (Western Springs)				
Defenders	(New Zealand) Christian Gray (Auckland City)		(New Zealand) Aidan Carey (Western Springs)		(New Zealand) Theo Ettema (Miramar Rangers)
Midfielders	(New Zealand) Jack-Henry Sinclair (Wellington Olympic)	(Spain) Gerard Garriga (Auckland City)	(New Zealand) David Yoo (Auckland City)	(New Zealand) Tor Davenport-Petersen (Wellington Olympic)	(New Zealand) Owen Smith (Miramar Rangers)
Forwards	(Uruguay) Martín Bueno (Miramar Rangers)			(New Zealand) Isa Prins (Wellington Olympic)	
