= 2016 Women's Knockout Cup =

Tournament details
- Venue(s): QBE Stadium, Auckland
- Dates: 15 May – 11 September 2016
- Teams: 43

Final positions
- Champions: Forrest Hill Milford
- Runners-up: Glenfield Rovers

Awards
- Maia Jackman Trophy: Tessa Huntington

The 2016 Women's Knockout Cup is New Zealand's women's 23rd knockout football competition.

The 2016 competition had three rounds before quarter-finals, semi-finals, and a final. Competition was run in three regions (northern, central, southern) until the quarter-finals, from which stage the draw was open. In all, 43 teams entered the competition.

== The 2016 final ==
The 2016 final was played between two Auckland teams Forrest Hill Milford and Glenfield Rovers at QBE Stadium before the men's Chatham Cup final. This was Forrest Hill-Milford second final appearance, having lost previously in the 2014 final, while Glenfield Rovers had won the cup the last two seasons and was looking for the three-peat. Forrest Hill-Milford won the game 4–3 on penalties after finishing 1–1 at full time and 2–2 at the end of extra time. Tessa Huntington was the winner of the Maia Jackman trophy for the most valuable player. This final is also notable for being the first women's final to be televised live in New Zealand.

== Results ==
=== Round 1 ===
Northern Region

15 May 2016	Bay Olympic	0–9	Central United	Olympic Park, Auckland
11:00		Report

15 May 2016	Papakura City	11–0	Clendon United	McLennan Park, Auckland
13:00		Report

15 May 2016	Melville United	2–3	Rotorua United	Gower Park, Hamilton
14:00		Report

Central/Capital Region

15 May 2016	Palmerston North Marist	10–0	Stop Out	Memorial Park, Palmerston North
13:00		Report

15 May 2016	Napier Marist	1–3	Wairarapa United	Park Island 2, Napier
13:00		Report

15 May 2016	Petone	5–1	Brooklyn Northern United	Memorial Park, Wellington
13:00		Report

15 May 2016	Kapiti Coast United	1–2	Victoria University of Wellington AFC	Weka Park, Kāpiti Coast
13:00		Report

Mainland Region

14 May 2016	FC Twenty 11	7–0	Halswell United	Avonhead Park, Christchurch
12:00		Report

14 May 2016	Cashmere Technical	4–0	Parklands United	Garrick Memorial Park, Christchurch
12:00		Report

14 May 2016	Universities	2–1	Waimak United	Ilam Field, Christchurch
12:30		Report

Southern Region

15 May 2016	Northern	0–13	Queenstown Rovers	Caledonian Ground, Dunedin
12:00		Report

All teams listed below received byes to the second round.
Northern Region: Claudelands Rovers, Eastern Suburbs, Ellerslie, Forrest Hill Milford, Glenfield Rovers, Hamilton Wanderers, Hibiscus Coast, Lynn-Avon United, Metro FC, Norwest United, Papatoetoe AFC, Three Kings United, Western Springs.
Central/Capital Region: Seatoun, Upper Hutt City, Valeron Wanderers FC, Wellington United.
Mainland Region: Cashmere Technical FC, Coastal Spirit FC, Waimak United FC.
Southern Region: Dunedin Technical, Otago University AFC, Roslyn-Wakari AFC.

=== Round 2 ===
Northern Region

5 June 2016	Forrest Hill Milford	3–1	Papatoetoe AFC	Becroft Park, Auckland
13:00	Huntington 35'; Steinmetz 46'; Knott 49'	Report	Asafo-Tavitan 25'

5 June 2016	Claudelands Rovers	3–2*	Three Kings United	Galloway Park, Auckland
13:00	Gubb 8'; Golding 24'; Krystman 54'	Report	Leong 80'; Puketapu 86'

5 June 2016	Eastern Suburbs	13–0	Papakura City	Madills Farm Reserve, Auckland
13:00	Hand (3); Parris (7); Cleverley (2); Waters	Report

5 June 2016	Ellerslie	0–1	Lynn-Avon United	Michaels Avenue, Auckland
12:00		Report	Ferrier

5 June 2016	Rotorua United	2–0	Central United	Neil Hunt Park, Rotorua
13:00	Maguire 11'; Fisher 53'	Report

5 June 2016	Western Springs AFC	3–1	Norwest United	Seddon Fields, Auckland
13:00	O’Neill (2); Murray	Report	Pretty

5 June 2016	Hibiscus Coast AFC	0–7	Glenfield Rovers	Stanmore Bay Park, Whangaparaoa
13:00		Report	Skilton 1', 26', 30', 60'; Rood 25', 62'; Van Noorden 28'

6 June 2016	Metro FC	4–3 (a.e.t.)	Hamilton Wanderers AFC	Phyllis Street Reserve, Auckland
12:00	Douglas; Burton; Oulaghan; Khanthee	Report	Ryan (2); Bloxham

Central/Capital Region

5 June 2016	Upper Hutt	12–0	Victoria University of Wellington AFC	Maidstone Park, Wellington
13:00	Stewart 9', 13', 25'; Main 27', 37', 38', 50', 61', 75', 80'; Lavery 73'; Stirling 90'	Report

5 June 2016	Petone	0–4	Wellington United	Memorial Park, Wellington
13:00		Report	Hunter 61'; Grange 67'; Robertson 76', 80'

5 June 2016	Valeron Wanderers	0–2	Seatoun	Skoglund Park, Palmerston North
13:00		Report	Olson (2)

6 June 2016	Palmerston North Marist	7–0	Wairarapa United	Memorial Park, Palmerston North
13:00		Report

Mainland Region

6 June 2016	FC Twenty 11	3–2	Universities	Avonhead Park, Christchurch
12:30	Dockerty 4'; Own goal 35'; Stewart 55'	Report	Daly-Davies 30'; Mason 56' (pen.)

6 June 2016	Coastal Spirit FC	2–3	Cashmere Technical	Endeavour Park, Christchurch
12:30	Dabner 41'; Harman-Watt 65'	Report	Barker 4'; Barker 32'; Wong 61'

Southern Region

4 June 2016	Queenstown Rovers	1–6	Otago University AFC	Queenstown Events Centre, Queenstown
12:00	Hislop 82'	Report	Lewis 2'; Drake 24', 50', 90'; Christie 44'; Bacon 58'

4 June 2016	Dunedin Technical	1–1 (a.e.t.) (2–3 p)	Roslyn-Wakari AFC	Tahuna Park, Dunedin
12:45	Smith 54'	Report	McIntosh 78'

- Though Claudelands Rovers beat Three Kings United 3–2, they were found to have fielded an ineligible player so Three Kings United was awarded the 3–0 win and moved onto the 3rd round.

=== Round 3 ===
Northern Region

26 June 2016	Lynn-Avon United	0–9	Three Kings United	Ken Maunder Park, Auckland
13:00		Report	Blake (5); Puketapu (2); Satchell; Richards

26 June 2016	Glenfield Rovers	3–2	Eastern Suburbs	McFetridge Park, Auckland
13:00	Milne; Skilton; Rood	Report	Hand; Parris (pen.)

26 June 2016	Rotorua United	0–4	Western Springs	Neil Hunt Park, Rotorua
13:00		Report	O’Neill (3); Cooper

26 June 2016	Metro FC	1–5	Forrest Hill Milford	Phyllis Street Reserve, Auckland
13:00	Goldstone	Report	Christensen (2); Carlsen; Jervis; Vosper

Central/Capital Region

26 June 2016	Palmerston North Marist	3–4	Upper Hutt	Memorial Park, Palmerston North
13:00	Lynne-Lewis (3)	Report	Morrison; Stewart; Fibbes; Main

26 June 2016	Seatoun	1–0 (a.e.t.)	Wellington United	Seatoun Park, Wellington
13:00	Surridge	Report

Mainland/Southern Region

25 June 2016	Otago University AFC	0–1	Roslyn-Wakari	Logan Park, Dunedin
12:00		Report	Clark-Grant

25 June 2016	FC Twenty 11	0–7	Cashmere Technical	English Park, Christchurch
12:30		Report	Wong (3); Wieblitz (3); Barker

=== Quarter-finals ===
17 July 2016	Western Springs	0–5	Glenfield Rovers	Seddon Fields, Auckland
12:30		Report	Bultitude; Innes; Rood (3)

17 July 2016	Three Kings United	2–3	Forrest Hill Milford	Keith Hay Park, Auckland
13:00	Richards; Pritchard (pen.)	Report	Vosper; Christensen (2)

17 July 2016	Seatoun	0–1 (a.e.t.)	Upper Hutt	Seatoun Park, Wellington
13:00		Report	Bryant 120+3'

16 July 2016	Cashmere Technical	11–0	Roslyn-Wakari	Garrick Memorial Park, Christchurch
12:30	Wieblitz (4); Wong (2); Ward (2); Barker; van Empel; Barker	Report

=== Semi-finals ===
27 August 2016	Cashmere Technical	0–6	Forrest Hill Milford	Garrick Memorial Park, Christchurch
13:00		Report	Tawharu 16'; Steinmetz 50'; Rolston 55'; Christensen 68', 88', 90'

27 August 2016	Glenfield Rovers	1–0	Upper Hutt	McFetridge Park, Auckland
14:00	Rood 65'	Report

=== Final ===
11 September 2016	Forrest Hill Milford	2–2 (a.e.t.) (4–3 p)	Glenfield Rovers	QBE Stadium, Auckland
12:00	Huntington 52'; Rolston 110'	Report	Milne 17', 102'	Attendance: 4,216
	Penalties
	Wilson (penalty scored); Bott (penalty scored); Jervis (penalty scored); Christensen (penalty scored)		Rood (penalty scored); Milne (penalty scored); Jorgensen (penalty scored)
