= 2014 Women's Knockout Cup =

ASB Women's Knockout Cup
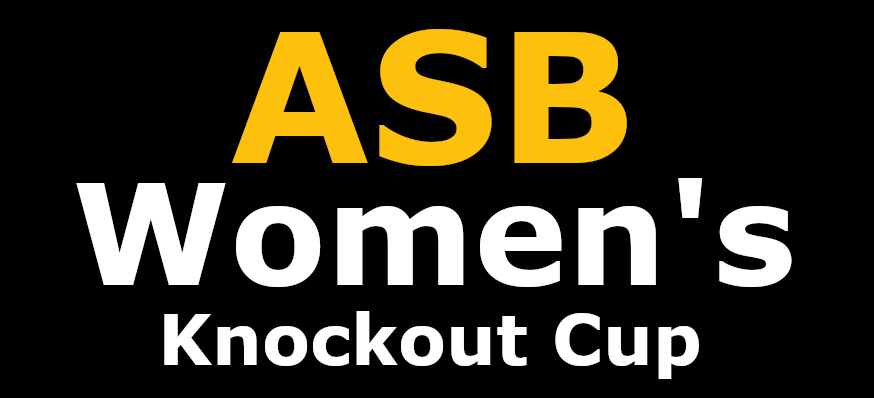

Tournament details
- Country: New Zealand
- Venue(s): QBE Stadium, North Shore
- Dates: 5 April 2014 – 7 September 2014
- Teams: 39

Final positions
- Champions: Glenfield Rovers (3rd title)
- Runners-up: Forrest Hill Milford United
- Semifinalists: Massey University; Coastal Spirit

Awards
- Maia Jackman Trophy: Katie Rood

The 2014 Women's Knockout Cup was New Zealand's women's 21st knockout football competition.

The 2014 competition had four rounds before the quarter-finals, semi-finals, and a final. The competition was run in three regions (Northern, Central, Southern) until the semi-finals, from which stage the draw was open. In all, 39 teams entered the competition.

== The 2014 final ==
The 2014 final was played between two Auckland teams, Glenfield Rovers and Forrest Hill-Milford United. It was played at QBE Stadium before the men's Chatham Cup final. Glenfield Rovers came back from behind to beat Forrest Hill-Milford United 3–2, claiming their second title in four years.

== Results ==
All results are taken from the following sources: The Ultimate New Zealand Soccer Website, New Zealand Football and Capital Football Season Review.

=== Qualifying round ===
5 April 2014	Canterbury University	3–1	Cashmere Technical	Ilam Field, Christchurch
		Report

5 April 2014	Parklands United	0–7	Coastal Spirit	Parklands Reserve, Christchurch
		Report

=== Round 1 ===
All results are taken from the following sources: The Ultimate New Zealand Soccer Website, New Zealand Football and Capital Football Season Review.

Northern Region

Drury United	0–14	Ellerslie	Drury Sportsgrounds, Drury

Metro	6–0	Whangarei	Phyllis Street Reserve, Auckland

Pukekohe	1–6	Norwest United	Bledisloe Park, Pukekohe

Central/Capital Region

Brooklyn Northern United	7–1	Wairarapa United	Wakefield Park, Wellington

Stop Out	3–4	Wellington United	Hutt Park, Lower Hutt

Mainland Region

Canterbury University	3–0	FC Twenty 11	Ilam Field, Christchurch

Cashmere Technical	5–0	Western	Garrick Memorial Park, Christchurch

Parklands United	2–1	Halswell United	Parklands Reserve, Christchurch

All teams listed below received byes to the second round.
Northern Region: Forrest Hill Milford, Western Springs, Lynn Avon United, Fencibles United, Hibiscus Coast
Central/Capital Region: Valeron Wanderers, Lower Hutt City, Massey University, Victoria University, North Wellington, Waterside Karori
Southern Region: Queenstown Rovers, Dunedin Technical, Roslyn Wakari, Southend United
All teams listed below received byes to the third round.
Northern Region: Claudelands Rovers, Eastern Suburbs, Three Kings United, Glenfield Rovers

=== Round 2 ===
All results and dates are taken from the following sources: The Ultimate New Zealand Soccer Website, New Zealand Football and Capital Football Season Review.

Northern Region

11 May 2014	Forrest Hill Milford United	7–0	Western Springs	Becroft Park, North Shore
	Emma Rolston 12', 24', 61'; Tayla O’Brien 44', 68'; Briar Palmer 64', 78'

11 May 2014	Lynn-Avon United	4–0	Ellerslie	Ken Maunder Park, Auckland
	Bella Kingi; Isabella Richards; Samantha Tawharu; Elizabeth Anton

11 May 2014	Metro	2–0	Fencibles United	Phyllis Street Reserve, Auckland
	Wyllowe Poata; Min Khanthee

11 May 2014	Norwest United	7–0	Hibiscus Coast	Huapai Domain, Kumeū
	Sophie Sills; Kirsten Peasey; Rhea Hornby; Nicole Cooper; Mel Giles

Central/Capital Region

Valeron Wanderers	10–2	Lower Hutt City	Ashhurst Domain, Palmerston North

Brooklyn Northern United	0–6	Massey University	Wakefield Park, Wellington

Victoria University	5–1	North Wellington	Boyd Wilson Turf, Wellington

Waterside Karori	2–1	Wellington United	Karori Park, Wellington

Mainland

Canterbury University	3–1	Cashmere Technical	Ilam Field, Christchurch

Parklands United	0–7	Coastal Spirit	Parklands Reserve, Christchurch

Southern Region

Queenstown Rovers	1–6	Dunedin Technical	Queenstown Events Centre, Queenstown

Roslyn-Wakari	15–0	Southend United	Ellis Park, Dunedin

=== Round 3 ===
All results and dates are taken from the following sources: The Ultimate New Zealand Soccer Website, New Zealand Football and Capital Football Season Review.

Northern Region

25 May 2014	Claudelands Rovers	9–1	Norwest United	Galloway Park, Hamilton
	Helen Collins; Kate Loye; Kylie Jens; Olivia Chance; Rebecca Brown; Tessa Leong		Nicole Cooper

25 May 2014	Eastern Suburbs	5–2 (a.e.t.)	Three Kings United	Madills Farm, Auckland
	Rebecca Tegg; Maxine Cooper; Sarah Gregorius; (o.g.)		Malia Steinmetz; Sam Muirhead

25 May 2014	Glenfield Rovers	9–0	Metro	McFetridge Park, North Shore
	Katie Jackson; Katie Rood; Ashleigh Ward; Emily Oosterhof; Briar McNamara

Lynn-Avon United	0–4	Forrest Hill Milford United	Ken Maunder Park, Auckland
		Tayla O’Brien; Michelle Windsor; Emma Rolston

Central/Capital Region

11 May 2014	Massey University	8–0	Victoria University	Massey University Football Fields, Palmerston North
	Rhonda Bridges; TJ Lyne-Lewis; Jane Barnett; Jess Green; Mikaela Boxall

11 May 2014	Waterside Karori	2–2 (a.e.t.) (2–1 p)	Valeron Wanderers	Karori Park, Wellington
	Chelsea O’Callaghan 26'; Caitlin Foster 48'		Ella Wiebe 16'; Libby Boobyer 64'

Mainland

11 May 2014	Coastal Spirit	1–1 (a.e.t.) (4–1 p)	Canterbury University	Cuthberts Green, Christchurch
	Emma Proctor		Pelatia Schwartfeger

Southern Region

11 May 2014	Dunedin Technical	6–3	Roslyn-Wakari	Culling Park, Dunedin

=== Quarter-finals ===
All results and dates are taken from the following sources: The Ultimate New Zealand Soccer Website, New Zealand Football and Capital Football Season Review.

8 June 2014	Eastern Suburbs	1–3	Glenfield Rovers	Madills Farm, Auckland
13:00

29 June 2014	Claudelands Rovers	2–3	Forrest Hill Milford United	Galloway Park, Hamilton
13:00	Kate Loye 6'; Rebecca Brown 45'		Emily Jensen 50'; Megan Lee 53'; Kate Seatter 76'

7 June 2014	Waterside Karori	0–4	Massey University	Karori Park, Wellington
12:00			Mikaela Boxall; Jane Barnett

8 June 2014	Coastal Spirit	2–1	Dunedin Technical	ASB Football Park, Christchurch
13:00

=== Semi-finals ===
All results and dates are taken from the following sources: The Ultimate New Zealand Soccer Website, New Zealand Football and Capital Football Season Review.

20 July 2014	Glenfield Rovers	5–0	Massey University	McFetridge Park, North Shore

20 July 2014	Forrest Hill Milford United	2–1	Coastal Spirit	Becroft Park, North Shore
	Emma Rolston; Daisy Cleverley		Lily Alfeld (o.g.)

=== Final ===
7 September 2014
11:00

Glenfield Rovers	3–2	Forrest Hill Milford United
Emma Rolston 2', 68'		Katie Rood 6', 28'; Katie Jackson 65'

QBE Stadium, North Shore
