= 2018 Kate Sheppard Cup =

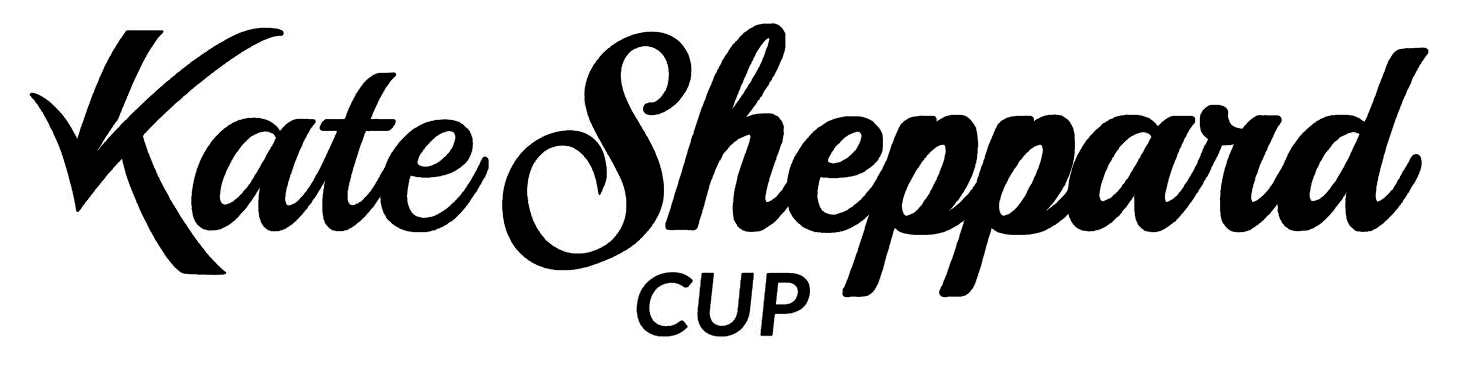

Tournament details
- Country: New Zealand
- Venue(s): QBE Stadium, Auckland
- Dates: 12 May – 9 September 2018
- Teams: 35

Final positions
- Champions: Dunedin Technical
- Runners-up: Forrest Hill Milford United

Tournament statistics
- Matches played: 35
- Goals scored: 167 (4.77 per match)

Awards
- Maia Jackman Trophy: Shontelle Smith

The 2018 Kate Sheppard Cup is New Zealand's women's 25th annual knockout football competition. This is the first year that the competition is known by the Kate Sheppard Cup, or New Zealand Football Foundation Kate Sheppard Cup for sponsorship purposes, after previously been known as the Women's Knockout Cup since its establishment.

The 2018 competition has three rounds before quarter-finals, semi-finals, and a final. Competition will run in three regions (northern, central, southern) until the quarter-finals, from which stage the draw will be open. In all, 35 teams entered the competition.

== The 2018 final ==
The 2018 final was the first time a team from Football South played in the final with Dunedin Technical representing the region against Forrest Hill Milford from Auckland. The final was played at QBE Stadium before the men's Chatham Cup final. This was Forrest Hill Milford United's third final appearance, having won it once in 2016 and lost it previously in their first final appearance in 2014. Dunedin Technical went on to win the game 4–2 meaning it was also the first time the trophy headed to the bottom of the South Island. Shontelle Smith from Tech was the winner of the Maia Jackman trophy for the most valuable player.

== Results ==
=== Round 1 ===
All matches were played on the weekend of 12–13 May 2018.

Central/Capital Region

12 May 2018	Petone FC	0–1 (a.e.t.)	Waterside Karori	Memorial Park, Lower Hutt
13:00		Report	Lynskey

12 May 2018	Victoria University	3–1	Brooklyn Northern United	Boyd Wilson Park, Wellington
13:00	Reilly; Wadsworth; Haselting	Report	Wilkinson

12 May 2018	Kapiti Coast United	10–0	Stop Out	Weka Park, Kāpiti
13:00	Addy (6); Whitton (2); Williams-Grey; Holmes	Report

Mainland Region

12 May 2018	Cashmere Technical	2–1	Waimakariri United	Garrick Memorial Park, Christchurch
12:00	Barker; Maoate-Cox	Report	Elstob

Southern Region

12 May 2018	Roslyn-Wakari	12–2	Mosgiel	Ellis Park, Dunedin
14:45	Baldwin (3); Bacon (3); Walker (2); Johnstone (2); Black; May Baldwin	Report	Pendreigh; Potter

13 May 2018	Queenstown Rovers	2–0	Green Island	Queenstown Events Centre, Queenstown
13:00	Giddings; Hislop	Report

All teams listed below received byes to the second round.
Northern Region: Forrest Hill Milford United, Glenfield Rovers, Norwest United, Three Kings United, Eastern Suburbs, Central United, Papakura City, Ellerslie, Onehunga Sports, Western Springs, Fencibles United, Otumoetai, Hamilton Wanderers.
Central/Capital Region: Palmerston North Marist, Wairarapa United, Wellington United, Seatoun, Upper Hutt City.
Mainland Region: Universities, Halswell United, Coastal Spirit.
Southern Region: Dunedin Technical, Otago University.

=== Round 2 ===
All matches were played on Queen's Birthday weekend 2–4 June 2018.

Northern Region

2 June 2018	Central United	0–3	Onehunga Sports	Kiwitea Street, Auckland
12:00		Report	5' (o.g.); Stratford 46'; Duncan 81'

2 June 2018	Eastern Suburbs	3–0	Otumoetai FC	Madills Farm, Auckland
13:00		Report

2 June 2018	Three Kings United	9–0	Hibiscus Coast	Keith Hay Park, Auckland
14:00	Leong 8', 62'; Stewart-Hobbs 48', 73'; Toailoa 57'; King 64'; Leaming 76', 85'; Mathews 90'	Report

3 June 2018	Forrest Hill Milford United	5–0	Ellerslie	Becroft Park, North Shore
12:00	Vosper 23' (pen.); Mittendorff 50', 76'; Macintosh 52'; Tawharu 67'	Report

3 June 2018	Norwest United	3–0	Fencibles United	Huapai Reserve, Auckland
13:00		Report

4 June 2018	Hamilton Wanderers	2–0	Western Springs	Porritt Park, Hamilton
11:30	Cawte 65'; Wisnewski 90'	Report

Central/Capital Region

4 June 2018	Upper Hutt City	7–0	Kapiti Coast United	Maidstone Park, Upper Hutt
11:00	Stewart 10', 46', 70'; Madison Williams 54', 62'; Jefferies 55'; Main 90'	Report

4 June 2018	Seatoun	1–2	Waterside Karori	Seatoun Park, Wellington
13:00	Surridge 35'	Report	3' (o.g.); Barrott 52'

4 June 2018	Victoria University	0–6	Wellington United	Boyd Wilson Field, Wellington
13:00		Report	Robertson (3); Ohlsson (2); Robertson

4 June 2018	Wairarapa United	3–0	Palmerston North Marist	Memorial Park, Masterton
14:00	Rutene; Boone; Macintyre	Report

Mainland Region

4 June 2018	Cashmere Technical	1–5	Coastal Spirit	Garrick Park, Christchurch
10:30	Gilchrist 50'	Report	Roberts 20', 81'; Hepburn 56'; Dabner 70'; Cameron 90'

4 June 2018	Halswell United	1–4	Universities	Christchurch Football Centre, Christchurch
19:30	Hemsley 42'	Report	Parent 30'; Brodie 44', 60'; Barrett 55'

Southern Region

4 June 2018	Roslyn Wakari	0–1	Dunedin Technical	Ellis Park, Dunedin
13:00		Report	Smith

4 June 2018	Otago University	3–2	Queenstown Rovers	Caledonian Ground, Dunedin
13:00	Nicholson (2); Paterson	Report	Hislop (2)

All teams listed below received byes to the second round.
Northern Region: Papakura City, Glenfield Rovers

=== Round 3 ===
All matches were played on the weekend 23–24 June 2018.

Northern Region

23 June 2018	Eastern Suburbs	1–0	Papakura City	Madills Farm, Auckland
13:00	Parris 85'	Report

24 June 2018	Glenfield Rovers	2–2 (a.e.t.) (3–1 p)	Three Kings United	McFetridge Park, Auckland
11:00	Stevens 20'; Jenkins 79'	Report	King 4'; Pritchard 90+1' (pen.)

24 June 2018	Norwest United	0–3	Forrest Hill Milford United	Huapai Reserve, Auckland
13:00		Report	McKay Wright 45'; Lonergan 45+1'; Barnett 79'

24 June 2018	Hamilton Wanderers	4–1	Onehunga Sports	Porritt Park, Hamilton
13:00	Golding 25'; Brown 34', 82'; Foster 88'	Report	Stratford 64'

Central/Capital Region

23 June 2018	Upper Hutt City	0–2	Wairarapa United	Maidstone Park, Upper Hutt
12:00		Report	Boone 2', 16'

24 June 2018	Waterside Karori	0–7	Wellington United	Wakefield Park, Wellington
13:00		Report	Robertson 15', 29'; Rolston 29', 80'; Gieson 59', 85'; Ohlsson 65'

Mainland/Southern Region

23 June 2018	Dunedin Technical	7–1	Universities	Tahuna Park, Dunedin
14:00	Gray 28', 43', 55'; Smith 35', 83'; Wall 47', 77'	Report	Barrett 70'

23 June 2018	Otago University	0–8	Coastal Spirit	Caledonian Ground, Dunedin
14:00		Report	Lake 21'; Jones 32' (pen.); Cameron 46', 83', 89'; Taylor 56', 79', 82'

=== Quarter-finals ===
All matches were originally organised to be played on the weekend 14–15 July 2018 however two matches were postponed due to weather conditions, the match between Hamilton Wanderers and Forrest Hill Milford was played on the 22 July 2018 and Eastern Suburbs v Glenfield Rovers was played on 26 July 2018.

Northern Region

22 July 2018	Hamilton Wanderers	3–4	Forrest Hill Milford United	Porritt Park, Hamilton
13:00	Brady 21', 89'; Maguire 47'	Report	Wilson 17'; Tawharu 20', 34'; Barnett 55'

26 July 2018	Eastern Suburbs	1–1 (a.e.t.) (3–4 p)	Glenfield Rovers	Madills Farm, Auckland
19:00	Carter 41' (pen.)	Report	Gross 33'

Central/Capital Region

14 July 2018	Wellington United	3–1	Wairarapa United	Newtown Park, Wellington
12:00	Van Dam; Robertson (2)	Report	McPhie

Mainland/Southern Region

15 July 2018	Coastal Spirit	1–4	Dunedin Technical	Cuthberts Green, Christchurch
12:30	Taylor	Report	Guildford (2); Morison; Anderson

=== Semi-finals ===
Matches were played on the weekend 25–26 August 2018. The draw was originally done before the results of the Eastern Suburbs v Glenfield Rovers and Hamilton Wanderers v Forrest Hill Milford postponed matches where known.

25–26 August 2018	Wellington United	2–4	Dunedin Technical	Newtown Park, Wellington
14:00	Ohlsson 16'; Giesen 46'	Report	Milne 18', 85'; Wall 38', 75'

26 August 2018	Glenfield Rovers	1–3	Forrest Hill Milford United	McFetridge Park, Auckland
14:00	Milne 56'	Report	Barnett 18', 50', 53'

=== Final ===
The final was played on the 9 September 2018.

9 September 2018	Forrest Hill Milford United	2–4	Dunedin Technical	QBE Stadium, Auckland
12:00	Barnett 21', 49'	Report	Hunt 10', 34'; Wall 15'; Morison 26'
