= 2018 Chatham Cup =

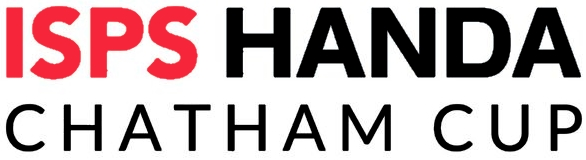

Tournament details
- Country: New Zealand
- Dates: 25 April 2018 – 9 September 2018
- Teams: 137

Final positions
- Champions: Birkenhead United
- Runners-up: Western Suburbs

Awards
- Jack Batty Memorial Cup: Alec Solomons

The 2018 Chatham Cup (known as the ISPS Handa Chatham Cup for sponsorship reasons) is New Zealand's 91st annual knockout football competition.

The 2018 competition will have a preliminary round and four rounds proper before quarter-finals, semi-finals, and a final. The final will be played on 10 September 2018.

== Results ==
=== Preliminary round ===
All matches were played on Anzac Day, Wednesday 25 April or Saturday 28 April 2018.

Northern Region

25 April 2018	Auckland Wanderers	1–4	Te Awamutu	Michaels Ave Reserve 2, Auckland
11:00	Stock	Report	O’Sullivan; Connor; H.Roil; J.Roil

25 April 2018	Bohemian Celtic	1–4	Onerahi	Bill McKinlay Park, Auckland
12:00	Birch	Report	Hanmore (x2); Boom; Murray

25 April 2018	Glen Eden United	3–0	Clendon United	Parrs Park (Football Turf), Auckland
14:00	Murch; Semp; Hastings	Report

25 April 2018	Papamoa	6–0	Tuakau	Gordon Spratt Reserve, Papamoa
14:00	Wilson; Higgins; Cooper; Boom; Hales; (o.g.)	Report

25 April 2018	Ranui Swanson	0–5	Internationale	Starling Park, Auckland
14:00		Report	Truant (x5)

25 April 2018	West Hamilton United	3–1 (a.e.t.)	Papatoetoe United	Weka Street, Hamilton
14:00	Whitehead; Cameron; Holten	Report	Chimbo

25 April 2018	Lynn-Avon United	1–0	Kaeo-Inter	Ken Maunder Park, Auckland
14:00	Irabor	Report

25 April 2018	Kiwi True Blues	3–2	Otumoetai	Michaels Ave Reserve 3, Auckland
14:00	Walker; Baggeley; McGookin	Report	Miller; Barnes

25 April 2018	University of Auckland	2–1	West Auckland	Cox’s Bay Reserve, Auckland
14:00	Nishitani-Hart; Smith	Report	Unknown

25 April 2018	Kerikeri	0–1	Greenhithe	Baysport Waipapa, Waipapa
14:00		Report	Fetter 65'

25 April 2018	Uni-Mt Wellington	4–1	Kawerau	Bill McKinlay Park, Auckland
15:30	Forsyth; Launders; Todd; Minto	Report	Unknown

28 April 2018	Northern Wairoa	1–8	Waiuku	Memorial Park, Dargaville
12:30		Report

28 April 2018	Navy	5–4	Auckland Volcanoes	Naval Sports Complex, Auckland
13:00		Report

28 April 2018	Plains Rangers	0–2	HNK Auckland	Awakeri Sports Field, Awakeri
14:00		Report

28 April 2018	Airforce	0–2	Warkworth	Whenuapai Air Base Oval, Whenuapai
14:00		Report

28 April 2018	Matamata Swifts	2–3	Ngaruawahia United	Matamata Domain, Matamata
14:00		Report

28 April 2018	Waikato Unicol	8–0	Mercury Tokoroa	Jansen Park, Hamilton
14:00		Report

28 April 2018	Taupō	5–0	Otorohanga	Crown Park, Taupō
14:45		Report

Central Region

25 April 2018	North End	2–1	Gisborne Thistle	Memorial Park, Palmerston North
13:00	Franklin; Cooksley	Report	Hofman

25 April 2018	Wanganui Athletic	3–1	New Plymouth Rangers	Wembley Park, Whanganui
14:00	Mailman; Holden (x2)	Report	Leggett

Mainland Region

25 April 2018	Richmond Athletic	0–2	FC Nelson	Jubilee Park, Richmond
14:00		Report	Croswell; Barlett

25 April 2018	St Albans Shirley	0–5	Western	English Park, Christchurch
14:00		Report	Pak; McDonald; Stanley (x2); Brandon

25 April 2018	Parklands United	2–1 (a.e.t.)	Christchurch United	Parklands Reserve, Christchurch
14:00	El Mohad; Robson	Report	MacIntyre

28 April 2018	Burnham	1–8	Waimakariri United	Coronation Park, Burnham
14:30		Report

Southern Region

25 April 2018	Mornington	1–3	Gore Wanderers	Kensington Oval, Dunedin
14:00	Crane	Report	Boland; Rea; (o.g.)

28 April 2018	Thistle FC	4–1	Melchester Rovers	ILT Football Turf, Invercargill
15:00		Report

All teams listed below received byes to the first round.

Northern Region: All Lotto Sport Italia NRFL Premier teams
Central Region: Palmerston North Marist
Capital Region: All Capital Football teams
Mainland Region: Nelson Suburbs, Tahuna, Rangers, Cashmere Technical, Coastal Spirit, Ferrymead Bays, Selwyn United, FC Twenty 11, Nomads United, Universities, Burwood, Halswell United
Southern Region: Dunedin Tech, Queenstown Rovers, Green Island, Caversham, Mosgiel, Northern, Otago Uni, Roslyn Wakari, Grant Braes, Geraldine, Thistle (Timaru), West End, Queens Park, Old Boys

=== Round 1 ===
Round 1 matches took place between 12 and 13 May 2018.

Northern Region

12 May 2018	Glen Eden United	0–3	Bucklands Beach	Parrs Park, West Auckland
14:00		Report

12 May 2018	Lynn-Avon United	0–4	Melville United	Ken Maunder Park, Auckland
14:00		Report

12 May 2018	Taupō	1–1 (a.e.t.) (4–3 p)	University of Auckland	Crown Park, Taupō
14:00		Report

12 May 2018	Greenhithe	2–1	Manurewa	QBE Stadium 4, Auckland
14:00		Report

12 May 2018	Waiuku	1–3	Papamoa	Massey Park, Auckland
14:00		Report

12 May 2018	Uni-Mt Wellington	3–3 (a.e.t.) (4–2 p)	Oratia United	Bill McKinlay Park, Auckland
14:00		Report

12 May 2018	North Shore United	4–1	Papakura City	Allen Hill Stadium, North Shore
14:00		Report

12 May 2018	Claudelands Rovers	3–2	Fencibles United	Galloway Park, Auckland
14:00		Report

12 May 2018	Onehunga-Mangere United	2–4	Hibiscus Coast	Mangere Domain, Auckland
14:00		Report

12 May 2018	Forrest Hill Milford United	6–0	Internationale	Becroft Park, Auckland
14:00		Report

12 May 2018	West Hamilton United	1–2	Franklin United	Weka Street, Hamilton
14:00		Report

12 May 2018	Mt Albert Ponsonby	8–0	Navy	Anderson Park, Auckland
14:00		Report

12 May 2018	Te Atatu	4–7 (a.e.t.)	Metro	Te Atatū Peninsula Park, West Auckland
14:00		Report

12 May 2018	Waikato Unicol	5–0	Ngaruawahia United	Jansen Park, Hamilton
14:00		Report

12 May 2018	Albany United	11–2	Warkworth	Rosedale Park, Auckland
14:00		Report

12 May 2018	Onerahi	2–6	Takapuna	Onerahi Airport, Whangārei
14:00		Report

12 May 2018	Cambridge	2–3	Waiheke United	John Kerkhof Park, Cambridge
14:30		Report

12 May 2018	HNK Auckland	0–2	Waitemata	Croatian Cultural Club, Auckland
15:00		Report

12 May 2018	Ellerslie	4–2	Te Awamutu	Michaels Ave Reserve, Auckland
15:00		Report

13 May 2018	Kiwi True Blues	1–3	Tauranga City United	Michaels Ave Reserve, Auckland
12:00		Report

Central / Capital Region

12 May 2018	Kapiti Coast United	15–0	Martinborough	Weka Park, Kāpiti
13:00		Report

12 May 2018	Wanganui Athletic	3–6	Palmerston North Marist	Wembley Park, Whanganui
14:00		Report

12 May 2018	Marist	0–1	Wainuiomata	Miramar Park, Wellington
14:00		Report

12 May 2018	Tawa	0–4	Western Suburbs	Redwood Park, Wellington
14:00		Report

12 May 2018	Stokes Valley	1–5	Island Bay United	Delaney Park, Lower Hutt
14:00		Report

12 May 2018	North Wellington	4–2	Brooklyn Northern United	Alex Moore Park, Wellington
14:30	Bilderbeck; Gillespie; Kowal	Report	Collins; Hall

12 May 2018	Upper Hutt City	7–3 (a.e.t.)	Seatoun	Maidstone Park, Upper Hutt
15:00		Report

12 May 2018	Victoria University	3–2	Naenae	Boyd Wilson Park, Wellington
17:15		Report

12 May 2018	Lower Hutt City	4–2	Miramar Rangers	Fraser Park, Lower Hutt
17:45		Report

12 May 2018	Wellington Olympic	5–1	Petone	Wakefield Park, Wellington
17:45		Report

13 May 2018	Napier City Rovers	6–0	North End	Bluewater Stadium, Napier
14:00		Report

Mainland Region

12 May 2018	Nomads United	3–5	Cashmere Technical	Tulett Park, Christchurch
13:30		Report

12 May 2018	Nelson Suburbs	7–0	FC Nelson	Saxton Field, Nelson
14:00		Report

12 May 2018	Coastal Spirit	5–0	Waimakariri United	Cuthberts Green, Christchurch
14:00		Report

12 May 2018	Parklands United	0–5	Selwyn United	Parklands Reserve, Christchurch
14:00		Report

12 May 2018	Western	5–1	Halswell United	Walter Park, Christchurch
14:00		Report

12 May 2018	Ferrymead Bays	3–0	Universities	Ferrymead Park, Christchurch
14:00		Report

12 May 2018	FC Twenty 11	2–0	Burwood	Avonhead Park, Christchurch
14:15		Report

12 May 2018	Rangers (Blenheim)	1–0	Tahuna	A&P Park, Blenheim
15:00		Report

Southern Region

12 May 2018	Dunedin Technical	6–1	Gore Wanderers	Tahuna Park, Dunedin
14:00		Report

12 May 2018	Green Island	4–3 (a.e.t.)	Caversham	Sunnyvale Park, Dunedin
14:00		Report

12 May 2018	Timaru Thistle	1–3	Old Boys	Anzac Square, Timaru
14:00		Report

12 May 2018	West End	1–6	Roslyn Wakari	West End Park, Timaru
14:00		Report

12 May 2018	Queens Park	3–5	Northern	Surrey Park, Invercargill
14:00		Report

12 May 2018	Otago University	1–7	Queenstown Rovers	Caledonian Ground, Dunedin
14:00		Report

12 May 2018	Invercargill Thistle	3–5	Mosgiel	ILT Football Turf, Invercargill
15:00		Report

13 May 2018	Geraldine	0–1	Grants Braes	Geraldine Domain, Geraldine
13:00		Report

All teams listed below received byes to the second round.

Northern Region: Hamilton Wanderers, Western Springs, Onehunga Sports, Glenfield Rovers, Waitakere City, Manukau United, Three Kings United, East Coast Bays, Birkenhead United, Eastern Suburbs, Central United, Bay Olympic
Central Region: Havelock North Wanderers
Capital Region: Wellington United, Stop Out, Wairarapa United, Waterside Karori

=== Round 2 ===
All matches will be played on Queen's Birthday weekend Monday 4 June 2018.

Northern Region

4 June 2018	Forrest Hill Milford United	1–2 (a.e.t.)	Three Kings United	Becroft Park, Auckland
14:00		Report

4 June 2018	Metro	1–4	Tauranga City United	Phyllis Street Reserve, Auckland
14:00		Report

4 June 2018	Eastern Suburbs	1–2	East Coast Bays	Madills Farm, Auckland
14:00		Report

4 June 2018	North Shore United	4–0	Uni-Mt Wellington	Allen Hill Stadium, North Shore
14:00		Report

4 June 2018	Mt Albert-Ponsonby	4–0	Taupō	Anderson Park, Auckland
14:00		Report

4 June 2018	Papamoa	1–0	Bay Olympic	Gordon Spratt Reserve, Papamoa Beach
14:00		Report

4 June 2018	Central United	3–3 (a.e.t.) (4–3 p)	Waitakere City	Kiwitea Street, Auckland
14:00		Report

4 June 2018	Waitemata	3–4 (a.e.t.)	Bucklands Beach	McLeod Park, Auckland
14:00		Report

4 June 2018	Claudelands Rovers	1–6	Onehunga Sports	Galloway Park, Hamilton
14:00		Report

9 June 2018	Franklin United	2–3	Waikato Unicol	Drury Sports Complex, Drury
14:00		Report

4 June 2018	Western Springs	5–0	Takapuna	Seddon Fields, Auckland
14:00		Report

4 June 2018	Birkenhead United	1–0	Waiheke United	Shepherds Park, North Shore
14:00		Report

4 June 2018	Albany United	0–2	Glenfield Rovers	Rosedale Park, North Shore
14:00		Report

4 June 2018	Greenhithe	2–2 (a.e.t.) (2–3 p)	Hibiscus Coast	QBE Stadium 4, North Shore
14:00		Report

9 June 2018	Hamilton Wanderers	1–3	Manukau United	Porritt Stadium, Hamilton
14:00		Report

4 June 2018	Ellerslie	3–4 (a.e.t.)	Melville United	Michaels Ave Reserve, Auckland
15:00		Report

Capital / Central Region

4 June 2018	Wainuiomata	1–2	Stop Out Sports Club	Richard Prouse Park, Lower Hutt
13:00		Report

4 June 2018	Havelock North Wanderers	0–3	Western Suburbs	Guthrie Park, Havelock North
13:00		Report

4 June 2018	North Wellington	6–3	Victoria University	Alex Moore Park, Wellington
13:30	Kowal; Gillespie; Packer; Larsen; Sander	Report	Clarke

4 June 2018	Island Bay United	0–5	Wellington Olympic	Wakefield Park, Wellington
14:00		Report

4 June 2018	Upper Hutt City	3–0	Napier City Rovers	Maidstone Park Upper Hutt
14:00		Report

4 June 2018	Wellington United	3–6	Wairarapa United	Newtown Park, Wellington
14:00		Report

4 June 2018	Lower Hutt City	1–2	Palmerston North Marist	Fraser Park, Lower Hutt
14:00		Report

4 June 2018	Kapiti Coast United	0–1	Waterside Karori	Weka Park, Kāpiti
14:00		Report

Mainland Region

4 June 2018	Rangers (Blenheim)	2–1	Western	A&P Park, Blenheim
12:00		Report

4 June 2018	FC Twenty 11	2–3 (a.e.t.)	Nelson Suburbs	Avonhead Park, Christchurch
12:00		Report

4 June 2018	Selwyn United	0–6	Coastal Spirit	Foster Park, Rolleston
14:00		Report

4 June 2018	Cashmere Technical	2–0	Ferrymead Bays	Garrick Park, Christchurch
14:00		Report

Southern Region

4 June 2018	Old Boys	0–3	Grants Braes	ILT Football Turf, Invercargill
14:00		Report

4 June 2018	Northern	2–3	Mosgiel	Forrester Park, Dunedin
14:00		Report

4 June 2018	Dunedin Technical	2–2 (a.e.t.) (3–4 p)	Roslyn Wakari	Tahuna Park, Dunedin
14:00		Report

4 June 2018	Green Island	1–0 (a.e.t.)	Queenstown Rovers	Sunnyvale Park, Dunedin
14:00		Report

=== Round 3 ===
All matches were played on the weekend of 23–24 June 2018.

Northern Region

23 June 2018	Melville United	6–2	Hibiscus Coast	Gower Park, Hamilton
14:00	Lamb 26', 33'; Haye 53'; Boss 68', 86'; Davies 84'	Report	Mayes 27', 49'

23 June 2018	Manukau United	3–0	Three Kings United	Centre Park, Auckland
14:00	Issa 17'; Shaker 45+2'; Estay 64'	Report

23 June 2018	North Shore United	0–1	Mt Albert-Ponsonby	Allen Hill Stadium, Auckland
14:00		Report	Black 51'

23 June 2018	East Coast Bays	5–0	Bucklands Beach	Bay City Park, Auckland
14:00	Bresnahan 13'; Stansfield 19', 26'; McMinn 35'; Archer 43'	Report

23 June 2018	Waikato Unicol	0–3	Central United	Jansen Park, Hamilton
14:00		Report	Bonsu 32', 67'; Ryder 87'

24 June 2018	Glenfield Rovers	3–3 (a.e.t.) (4–5 p)	Onehunga Sports	McFetridge Park, Auckland
14:00	Olivares 57', 59'; Carmichael 66'	Report	Mata 15'; Porter 52', 72'

24 June 2018	Birkenhead United	5–1	Papamoa	Shepherds Park, Auckland
14:00	Jorgenson 17'; Connor-McLean 26'; Bolton-Roberts 68'; McIsaac 80'; Anderson 85'	Report	Cooper 66'

24 June 2018	Tauranga City United	2–6	Western Springs	Links Avenue, Tauranga
14:00	(o.g.); O’Regan 90+1'	Report	Shafahi 13', 63'; Dickinson 24', 29'; Richards 37'; Mulrooney 58'

Central / Capital Region

23 June 2018	Waterside Karori	3–6 (a.e.t.)	Western Suburbs	Karori Park, Wellington
14:00	Kyung Dong 65'; Cain 83'; Davenport-Petersen 90+1'	Report	Just 5', 95'; Awad 4', 47'; McCowatt 97'; Parker-Price 107'

23 June 2018	North Wellington	3–2	Upper Hutt City	Alex Moore Park, Wellington
14:30	, 8' (o.g.); Sander 69'; Cripps 87'	Report	Fong 37'; Dawson 60'

23 June 2018	Wellington Olympic	0–5	Wairarapa United	Wakefield Park, Wellington
17:45		Report	Soromon 5', 81'; Ifill 25', 57'; Watson 61'

24 June 2018	Palmerston North Marist	0–1	Stop Out	Memorial Park, Palmerston North
14:00		Report	Gulley 47' (pen.)

Mainland / Southern Region

23 June 2018	Coastal Spirit	0–0 (a.e.t.) (2–3 p)	Cashmere Technical	Cuthberts Green, Christchurch
14:00		Report

23 June 2018	Roslyn-Wakari	3–1	Mosgiel	Ellis Park, Dunedin
14:00	Anderson 19'; Wilkie 78'; Treadwell 89'	Report	Coldicott 34'

23 June 2018	Grants Braes	0–2	Green Island	Ocean Grove Domain, Dunedin
14:00		Report	Robinson 23'; Johnston 63'

23 June 2018	Rangers (Blenheim)	0–1	Nelson Suburbs	A&P Park, Blenheim
14:30		Report	Sillars

=== Round 4 ===
All matches were originally organised to be played on the weekend 14–15 July 2018 however the match between Manukau United and Mt Albert Ponsonby was played on the 21 July 2018 after originally being postponed due to weather conditions.

Northern Region

14 July 2018	Melville United	1–3	Onehunga Sports	Gower Park, Hamilton
14:00	Hayes 7'	Report	Ozawa 39', 41'; Hudson-Wihongi 82'

14 July 2018	Central United	0–5	East Coast Bays	Kiwitea Street, Auckland
14:00		Report	Berry 3', 62'; Baker 23', 68'; Archer 41'

21 July 2018	Manukau United	3–1 (a.e.t.)	Mt Albert-Ponsonby	Centre Park, Auckland
14:00	Estay 65', 120'; Issa 116'	Report	Mackay 55' (pen.)

15 July 2018	Birkenhead United	4–2 (a.e.t.)	Western Springs	Shepherds Park, Auckland
14:00	McIsaac 90+3'; Gray 90+5' (pen.); Connor-McLean 112'; Kelly 114'	Report	Abba 19', 36'; Debenham 110'

Capital / Central Region

14 July 2018	Wairarapa United	2–1	Stop Out	Memorial Park Turf, Masterton
17:45	Watson 27', 90+1' (pen.)	Report	Corrales 84' (pen.)

15 July 2018	North Wellington	1–4	Western Suburbs	Alex Moore Park, Wellington
14:00	Kowal 53'	Report	Awad 43'; Just 51', 86'; Billingsley 71'

Mainland / Southern Region

14 July 2018	Nelson Suburbs	1–0	Green Island	Saxton Field, Nelson
14:00	Tod-Smith 20'	Report

15 July 2018	Cashmere Technical	2–0	Roslyn-Wakari	Garrick Park, Christchurch
13:00	Tuckey 39'; Clapham 85' (pen.)	Report

=== Quarter-finals ===
The quarter-finals were played between 4–5 August.

4 August 2018	Manukau United	1–2	Cashmere Technical
	Issa 12'	Report	Matthysen 25'; Schwarz 66'

4 August 2018	Onehunga Sports	1–4	Western Suburbs
	Boss 42'	Report	Awad 12'; McCowatt 23', 87'; Just 29'

4 August 2018	Wairarapa United	1–2	Birkenhead United
	Watson 75'	Report	Burfoot 22'; Grey 32' (pen.)

5 August	Nelson Suburbs	1–0	East Coast Bays
	Ridsdale 43'	Report

=== Semi-finals ===
The semi-finals were played on the weekend of 25–26 August 2018.

25 August 2018	Cashmere Technical	2–3 (a.e.t.)	Western Suburbs	Garrick Park, Christchurch
14:00	Matthysen 3'; Clapham 45'	Report	Garbett 7'; Awad 32'; Wooldridge 110'

26 August 2018	Nelson Suburbs	0–2	Birkenhead United	Saxton Field, Nelson
14:00		Report	Gray 60' (pen.), 90+2' (pen.)

=== Final ===
The final was played on 9 September 2018.

9 September 2018	Birkenhead United	1–1 (a.e.t.) (5–4 p)	Western Suburbs	QBE Stadium, Auckland
15:30	Connor-McClean 7'	Report	Awad 34'	Attendance: 3,364
	Penalties
	Gray (penalty missed); Burfoot (penalty scored); Solomons (penalty scored); McIsaac (penalty scored); Darkwa (penalty scored); Jorgenson (penalty scored)		(penalty missed) Moss-Edge; (penalty scored) Awad; (penalty scored) Thomas; (penalty scored) Sippola; (penalty scored) Wilkins; (penalty missed) Wooldridge
