= 2017 Women's Knockout Cup =

Tournament details
- Venue(s): QBE Stadium, Auckland
- Dates: 14 May 2017 – 10 September 2017
- Teams: 38

Final positions
- Champions: Glenfield Rovers
- Runners-up: Eastern Suburbs

Awards
- Maia Jackman Trophy: Kate Loye

The 2017 Women's Knockout Cup is New Zealand's women's 24th knockout football competition.

The 2017 competition had three rounds before quarter-finals, semi-finals, and a final. Competition was run in three regions (northern, central, southern) until the quarter-finals, from which stage the draw was open. In all, 38 teams entered the competition.

== The 2017 final ==
The 2017 final was played between two Auckland teams Glenfield Rovers and Eastern Suburbs at QBE Stadium before the men's Chatham Cup final. This was Glenfield Rovers seventh final appearance, having won three and lost three previously including the 2016 final, while Eastern Suburbs have only been in the final once before in 2005 where they lost to Lynn-Avon United. Glenfield went on to win the game 5–4 which was slightly generous to Suburbs in a game where Glenfield created more chances. Kate Loye from Rovers was the winner of the Maia Jackman trophy for the most valuable player.

== Results ==
=== Round 1 ===
Central/Capital Region

14 May 2017	Brooklyn Northern United	1–1 (4–3 p)	Petone	Wakefield Park, Wellington
13:00	Wilkinson 53'	Report	Robertson 28'

14 May 2017	Kapiti Coast United	1–2	Victoria University of Wellington AFC	Weka Park, Kāpiti
13:00	Holmes	Report	Gard 1'; Boyd 30'

Mainland Region

13 May 2017	Waimak United	1–6	Coastal Spirit	Kendall Park, Christchurch
11:30	Fraser 8'	Report	Clarke 9', 87'; Nicholson 46', 80'; Roberts (29); Jones 34' (pen.)

13 May 2017	Halswell United	11–0	Parklands United	Halswell Domain, Christchurch
13:00	Vallely 23', 87'; Hawley 31', 47'; Hemsley 32', 62'; Van Der Pol 37'; Bunting 42'; Neilson 64', 70'; Twiss 86'	Report

13 May 2017	Universities	1–4	FC Twenty 11	Ilam Field, Christchurch
13:00	Own goal	Report	Morrow; Stewart

Southern Region

13 May 2017	Roslyn-Wakari	10–0	Green Island	Ellis Park, Dunedin
11:00	Bacon 13', 41', 58', 84'; Johnstone 29'; Baldwin 34', 53', 67'; Whitson 79'; McIntosh 90'	Report

All teams listed below received byes to the second round.
Northern Region: Forrest Hill Milford, Glenfield Rovers, Hibiscus Coast, Norwest United, Ellerslie, Central United, Eastern Suburbs, Fencibles United, Metro FC, Papakura City, Three Kings United, Western Springs, Claudelands Rovers, Hamilton Wanderers, Otumoetai FC, Rotorua United.
Central/Capital Region: Palmerston North Marist, Wellington United, Upper Hutt City, Seatoun, Wairarapa United, Stop Out.
Mainland Region: Cashmere Technical FC.
Southern Region: Otago University, Dunedin Technical, Queenstown Rovers.

=== Round 2 ===
Northern Region

2 June 2017	Western Springs	2–1	Hibiscus Coast	Seddon Fields, Auckland
19:30	Dyer 10'; Own goal 42'	Report	Jones 17'

4 June 2017	Claudelands Rovers	7–0	Fencibles United	Galloway Park, Hamilton
13:00	Gubb 9', 62'; Own goal 18', 79'; Cawte 35'; Foster 49'; Krystman 67'	Report

4 June 2017	Norwest United	3–2	Metro	Huapai Reserve, Auckland
13:00	Cooper 19'; Own goal 52'; Waru 57'	Report	Poata 70'; Boyes 86'

4 June 2017	Three Kings United	18–0	Rotorua United	Keith Hay Park, Auckland
13:00	Dowsett 9', 19', 45', 51'; Blake 12', 60', 77', 86'; Jackson 19', 38', 45', 58', 83'; Puketapu 33', 35', 81'; Mathews 71'; Bloomfield 80'	Report

4 June 2017	Forrest Hill Milford	10–0	Papakura City	Becroft Park, Auckland
14:30	Knott 6'; Maynard 24', 34'; Tawharu 36', 72', 75', 87'; Wilson 46'; Mittendorf 65'; Vosper 81'	Report

5 June 2017	Ellerslie	0–12	Glenfield Rovers	Michaels Avenue Reserve, Auckland
12:00		Report	Rood 23', 32', 52', 61', 62'; Stevens 36', 50', 60', 74'; Mitchell 39', 40'; Loye 43'

5 June 2017	Central United	5–1	Otumoetai FC	Kiwitea Street, Auckland
13:00	Nimlos 21', 52'; Marinovich 23'; Khanthee 37', 74'	Report	Rockliffe 57'

5 June 2017	Hamilton Wanderers	2–9	Eastern Suburbs	Kiwitea Street, Auckland
13:00	Elliott 65' (78)	Report	Jale 18'; Hand 30', 71'; Seatter 33'; Phillips 64', 84', 86'; Whitley 88'; Van Dort 90'

Central/Capital Region

3 June 2017	Wellington United	0–2	Palmerston North Marist	Newtown Park, Wellington
12:00		Report	Fitzgerald 34', 50'

3 June 2017	Seatoun	2–0	Brooklyn Northern United	Seatoun Park, Wellington
12:30	Own goal 41'; Newton-Smith 43'	Report

3 June 2017	Wairarapa United	2–0	Stop Out	Memorial Park, Wellington
17:30	Aitenhead 51'; Jones 76'	Report

4 June 2017	Victoria University of Wellington AFC	0–1	Upper Hutt	Boyd Wilson Turf, Wellington
13:30		Report	Gregorius 42' (pen.)

Mainland Region

5 June 2017	Cashmere Technical	3–0	Halswell United	Garrick Memorial Park, Christchurch
11:00	Kench 9'; Frame 34'; Ward 72'	Report

5 June 2017	Coastal Spirit	2–0	FC Twenty 11	English Park, Christchurch
11:30	Webster 50', 79'	Report

Southern Region

5 June 2017	Roslyn-Wakari	2–0 (a.e.t.)	Otago University AFC	Ellis Park, Dunedin
11:00	Baldwin 103'; Clark-Grant 117'	Report

5 June 2017	Dunedin Technical	9–1	Queenstown Rovers	Caledonian Ground, Dunedin
14:00	Morrison 36', 39', 63'; Gray 17', 65'; Hayr 19', 33'; Smith 22'; Wall 86'	Report	Collin 80'

=== Round 3 ===
Northern Region

25 June 2017	Forrest Hill Milford	8–0	Central United	Becroft Park, Auckland
13:00	Waldren 29', 86'; Maynard 26', 52'; Own goal 60', 65'; Knott 67', 70'	Report

25 June 2017	Claudelands Rovers	1–4	Three Kings United	Galloway Park, Hamilton
13:00	Power 88'	Report	Burrows 15'; Jackson 23', 90'; Robert 69'

25 June 2017	Eastern Suburbs	8–0	Norwest United	Madills Farm Reserve, Auckland
13:00	Own goal 17', 61'; Phillips 26', 36'; Mettam 56', 63'; O'Brien 60', 66'	Report

25 June 2017	Western Springs	1–2	Glenfield Rovers	Seddon Fields, Auckland
14:45	Murray 53'	Report	Berger 33'; Rood 39'

Central/Capital Region

24 June 2017	Seatoun	1–5	Palmerston North Marist	Seatoun Park, Wellington
12:30	Morrissey 22'	Report	Jensen 10'; Phillips 35'; Lyne-Lewis 41'; Fitzgerald 76', 90'

24 June 2017	Upper Hutt	9–1	Wairarapa United	Maidstone Park, Wellington
15:00	Gregorius; Jeffries; Grace McRobie; Main; O'Reilly	Report	George

Mainland/Southern Region

24 June 2017	Dunedin Technical	3–0	Roslyn-Wakari	Tahuna Park, Dunedin
11:00	Morison 9'; Gray 32', 69'	Report

24 June 2017	Coastal Spirit	2–1 (a.e.t.)	Cashmere Technical	Cuthberts Green, Christchurch
12:30	Nicholson 85'; Lake 103'	Report	Kench 70'

=== Quarter-finals ===
6 August 2017	Eastern Suburbs	3–2	Three Kings United	Madills Farm Reserve, Auckland
13:00	Phillips 72'; Mettam 76'; Roxburgh 78'	Report	Burrows 32'; Harrison 90'

6 August 2017	Glenfield Rovers	3–1	Forrest Hill Milford	McFetridge Park, Auckland
13:00	Perkins 4'; Brown 37'; Stevens 72'	Report	Green 86'

5 August 2017	Upper Hutt	2–1 (a.e.t.)	Palmerston North Marist	Maidstone Park, Wellington
12:00	Main 13'; De Ronde 105'	Report	Lyne-Lewis 39'

5 August 2017	Dunedin Technical	3–2	Coastal Spirit	Caledonian Ground, Dunedin
12:30	Morison 13'; Dijkstra 45+1'; Hayr 88'	Report	Cameron 45'; Jones 78'

=== Semi-finals ===
26 August 2017	Dunedin Technical	0–2	Glenfield Rovers	Caledonian Ground, Dunedin
12:30		Report	Skilton 57'; Brown 68'

27 August 2017	Eastern Suburbs	5–0	Upper Hutt	Madills Farm Reserve, Auckland
14:00	Hand 60', 72', 88'; Roxburgh 67'; O'Brien 90+2'	Report

=== Final ===
10 September 2017	Glenfield Rovers	5–4	Eastern Suburbs	QBE Stadium, Auckland
12:00	Brown 28', 66'; Stevens 36', 64'; Berger 56'	Report	Hand 12'; Seatter 35'; Pilley 58', 75'	Referee: Anna-Marie Keighley
