= 2015 Women's Knockout Cup =

ASB Women's Knockout Cup
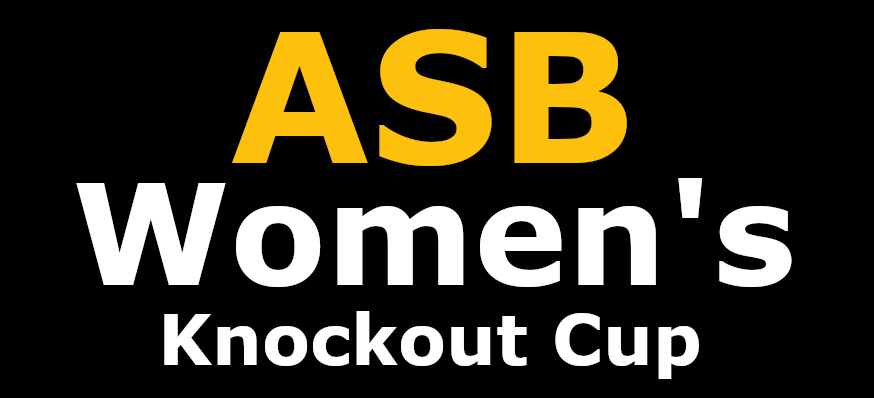

Tournament details
- Country: New Zealand
- Venue(s): Trust Arena, West Auckland
- Dates: 26 April 2015 – 20 September 2015
- Teams: 31

Final positions
- Champions: Glenfield Rovers (3rd title)
- Runners-up: Massey University
- Semifinalists: Coastal Spirit; Western Springs

Tournament statistics
- Matches played: 33
- Goals scored: 190 (5.76 per match)

Awards
- Maia Jackman Trophy: Estelle Harrison

The 2015 Women's Knockout Cup was New Zealand's women's 22nd knockout football competition.

The 2015 competition had three rounds before the quarter-finals, semi-finals, and a final. Competition was run in three regions (Northern, Central, Southern) until the quarter-finals, from which stage the draw was open. In all, 31 teams entered the competition.

== The 2015 final ==
The 2015 final was played between Glenfield Rovers from Auckland and Massey University from Palmerston North at Trust Arena, West Auckland before the men's Chatham Cup final. Glenfield Rovers beat Massey 4–0, claiming their third title in five years while inflicting Massey University second lost in the finals after they lost in 2013.

== Results ==
All results are taken from the following sources: The Ultimate New Zealand Soccer Website and Capital Football Season Review.

=== Round 1 ===
Central/Capital Region

26–27 April 2015	Victoria University	3–4	Wairarapa United	Boyd Wilson Turf, Wellington

26–27 April 2015	Palmerston North Marist	6–0	Stop Out	Memorial Park, Palmerston North

26–27 April 2015	Petone	10–1	Kapiti Coast United	Memorial Park, Wellington

Mainland Region

26–27 April 2015	Canterbury University	7–0	FC Twenty 11	Ilam Field, Christchurch

26–27 April 2015	Parklands United	4–1	Halswell United	Parklands Reserve, Christchurch

All teams listed below received byes to the second round.
Northern Region: Eastern Suburbs, Ellerslie, Fencibles United, Metro, North Force, Papakura City, Papatoetoe, Pukekohe, Three Kings United, Western Springs.
Central/Capital Region: Massey University, Seatoun, Upper Hutt City, Valeron Wanderers, Wellington United.
Mainland Region: Cashmere Technical, Coastal Spirit.
Southern Region: Dunedin Technical, Otago University, Queenstown Rovers, Roslyn Wakari.

These three teams received byes to the third round.
Northern Region: Claudelands Rovers, Forrest Hill-Milford United, Glenfield Rovers.

=== Round 2 ===
All results are taken from the following sources: The Ultimate New Zealand Soccer Website and Capital Football Season Review.

Northern Region

24 April-10 May 2015	Eastern Suburbs	7–0	Ellerslie	Madills Farm Reserve, Auckland

24 April-10 May 2015	Papakura City	15–0	Pukekohe	McLennan Park, Auckland

24 April-10 May 2015	Three Kings United	3–1	North Force	Keith Hay Park, Auckland

24 April-10 May 2015	Fencibles United	7–0	Metro	Riverhills Domain, Auckland

24 April-10 May 2015	Papatoetoe	0–7	Western Springs	Murdoch Park, Papatoetoe

Central/Capital Region

24 April-10 May 2015	Massey University	3–1	Petone FC	Massey University Football Fields, Palmerston North

24 April-10 May 2015	Wairarapa United	5–3	Valeron Wanderers	Memorial Park, Masterton

24 April-10 May 2015	Upper Hutt City	10–2	Palmerston North Marist	Maidstone Park, Upper Hutt

24 April-10 May 2015	Wellington United	5–2	Seatoun	Newtown Park, Wellington

Mainland Region

24 April-10 May 2015	Parklands United	0–1	Cashmere Technical	Parklands Reserve, Christchurch

24 April-10 May 2015	Coastal Spirit	2–0	Canterbury University	Cuthberts Green, Christchurch

Southern Region

24 April-10 May 2015	Otago University	1–0	Roslyn-Wakari	Caledonian Ground, Dunedin

24 April-10 May 2015	Queenstown Rovers	0–3	Dunedin Technical	Queenstown Events Centre, Queenstown

=== Round 3 ===
All results and dates are taken from the following sources: The Ultimate New Zealand Soccer Website, RSSSF and Capital Football Season Review.

Northern Region

31 May 2015	Claudelands Rovers	0–1	Western Springs	Galloway Park, Hamilton

31 May 2015	Papakura City	0–9	Eastern Suburbs	McLennan Park, Auckland

1 June 2015	Fencibles United	0–15	Glenfield Rovers	Riverhills Domain, Auckland

11 June 2015	Forrest Hill Milford United	2–0	Three Kings United	Becroft Park, North Shore

Central/Capital Region

31 May 2015	Wairarapa United	1–3	Massey University	Memorial Park, Masterton

31 May 2015	Upper Hutt City	3–4	Wellington United	Maidstone Park, Upper Hutt

Mainland/Southern Region

30 May 2015	Cashmere Technical	3–4	Coastal Spirit	Garrick Park, Christchurch

1 June 2015	Dunedin Technical	2–0	Otago University	Culling Park, Dunedin

=== Quarter-finals ===
All results and dates are taken from the following sources: The Ultimate New Zealand Soccer Website, RSSSF and Capital Football Season Review.

11 July 2015	Coastal Spirit	4–1	Dunedin Technical	Cuthberts Green, Christchurch

12 July 2015	Glenfield Rovers	2–0	Forrest Hill Milford United	McFetridge Park, North Shore

12 July 2015	Wellington United	0–2	Massey University	Newtown Park, Wellington

2 August 2015	Eastern Suburbs	2–3	Western Springs	Madills Farm, Auckland

=== Semi-finals ===
All results and dates are taken from the following sources: The Ultimate New Zealand Soccer Website, RSSSF and Capital Football Season Review.

23 August 2015	Massey University	7–2	Coastal Spirit	Massey University Football Fields, Palmerston North

23 August 2015	Glenfield Rovers	2–0	Western Springs	McFetridge Park, North Shore

=== Final ===
20 September 2015
12:00

Glenfield Rovers	4–0	Massey University
Harrison 12'; van Noorden 42'; Hallford 44'; Milne 53'	Report

Trust Arena, West Auckland
