= Megan Lee (footballer) =

New Zealand footballer (born 1995)

Personal information
- Full name: Megan Frances Lee
- Date of birth: 7 February 1995 (age 31)
- Place of birth: Auckland, New Zealand
- Height: 1.68 m (5 ft 6 in)
- Position: Forward

Team information
- Current team: Western Springs
- Number: 13

College career
Years	Team	Apps	(Gls)
2013–2016	LSU Tigers	72	(3)

Senior career*
Years	Team	Apps	(Gls)
2010–2012	Lynn-Avon United		(31)
2013–2014	Forrest Hill Milford United		(21)
2015	Norwest United		(5)
2022	West Coast Rangers		
2023–	Western Springs		

International career^{‡}
2010–2012	New Zealand U17	13	(1)
2013–2014	New Zealand U20	9	(3)
2013–2014	New Zealand	4	(0)
- * Club domestic league appearances and goals ‡ National team caps and goals as of 17 August 2014

Megan Frances Lee (born 7 February 1995) is a New Zealand footballer who plays as a forward for NRFL Women's Premiership side Western Springs. She has represented New Zealand at senior and age group level.

== Personal life ==
As of 2023, Lee works as New Zealand Football's performance and prevention officer.

== College career ==
Between 2013 and 2016, Lee attended Louisiana State University studying kinesiology with a concentration in fitness studies. She made 72 appearances for them, scoring 3 goals.

== Club career ==
Lee played for Lynn-Avon United between 2010 and 2012, scoring 34 goals in all competitions. Lee then moved to Forrest Hill Milford United for two seasons, scoring 24 goals. in 2015, Lee scored 5 goals for Norwest United.

Lee signed for West Coast Rangers for the 2022 season. In 2023, Lee was named in the Western Springs National League side, that won the Kate Sheppard Cup.

== International career ==
Lee was called up to the New Zealand women's national football team in June 2013 for friendlies against Australia and Japan. She didn't make her debut until 30 October 2013 in a 1–1 draw against the United States.

== Career statistics ==
=== International ===
As of match played on 7 March 2014.

Appearances and goals by national team and year
National team	Year	Apps	Goals
New Zealand	2013	1	0
New Zealand	2014	3	0
Total		4	0

== Honours ==
Western Springs

- Kate Sheppard Cup: 2023
