= 1995 Chatham Cup =

Tournament details
- Venue(s): McLean Park, Napier
- Dates: , 1995

Final positions
- Champions: Waitakere City (2nd title)
- Runners-up: North Shore United

The 1995 Chatham Cup was the 68th annual nationwide knockout football competition in New Zealand.

Up to the last 16 of the competition, the cup was run in three regions (northern, central, and southern), with an open draw from the quarter-finals on. National League teams received a bye until the third round (last 64). In all, 141 teams took part in the competition, which consisted of five rounds followed by quarter-finals, semi-finals, and a final.

== The 1995 final ==
Waitakere City completed the league/cup double.

== Results ==
=== Third Round ===
Albany Wairau United	0 – 5	South Auckland Rangers

Ashburton	1 – 9	Woolston WMC

Cambridge	2 – 4	Mount Wellington

Carlton (Auckland)	1 – 5	Tauranga City

Central (Auckland)	3 – 0	Oratia United

Christchurch Rangers	4 – 1	Christchurch United

Christchurch Technical	1 – 2	Halswell United

Dunedin Technical	0 – 4	Roslyn-Wakari

Eden (Auckland)	1 – 6	Waitakere City

Ellerslie	3 – 1	Pakuranga Town

Forrest Hill-Milford United	1 – 2	Takapuna City

Green Island	3 – 4	Waihopai

Hamilton Wanderers	3 – 1	East Coast Bays

Lower Hutt City	3 – 4	New Plymouth Rangers

Manawatu (Palmerston North)	2 – 0	Wellington United

Masterton	1 – 5	Palmerston North Marist

Melville (Hamilton)	0 – 2	Waikato United (Hamilton)

Mount Maunganui	2 – 1	Avondale United F.C. (Auckland)

Naenae	0 – 2	Petone

North Shore United	7 – 1	Mount Albert-Ponsonby

Onehunga Sports	3 – 0	Onehunga-Mangere United

Otahuhu United	w/o	Cadcam Services

Seatoun	5 – 3	Brooklyn Northern United

Shamrock (Christchurch)	2 – 3	Northern Hearts (Timaru)

Tawa	0 – 1	Miramar Rangers

Victoria University	0 – 1	Carterton

Wainuiomata	7 – 2	Red Sox (Palmerston North)

Wellington Olympic	1 – 3	Nelson United

Western Rangers (Hastings)	0 – 7	Napier City Rovers

Western Springs	0 – 4	Metro (Auckland)

West Harbour (Auckland)	1 – 0	Mount Roskill

Whangarei City	0 – 2	Glenfield Rovers

=== Fourth Round ===
Central	3 – 1	Hamilton Wanderers

Christchurch Rangers	11 – 0	Northern Hearts

Ellerslie	8 – 1	Otahuhu United

Glenfield Rovers	0 – 1	North Shore United

Manawatu	4 – 0	Carterton

Miramar Rangers	4 – 1	Wainuiomata

Mount Wellington	0 – 0 (aet)*	Mount Maunganui

Nelson United	1 – 3	New Plymouth Rangers

Onehunga Sports	5 – 2	Metro

Petone	4 – 1	Palmerston North Marist

Roslyn-Wakari	5 – 1	Woolston WMC

Seatoun	0 – 8	Napier City Rovers

South Auckland Rangers	3 – 1	West Harbour

Tauranga City	0 – 3	Waikato United

Waihopai	0 – 4	Halswell United

Waitakere City	6 – 0	Takapuna City

* Won on penalties by Mount Maunganui (9-8)

=== Fifth Round ===
Halswell United	3 – 4	Roslyn-Wakari

Miramar Rangers	3 – 0	Napier City Rovers

Mount Maunganui	1 – 0	Onehunga Sports

New Plymouth Rangers	1 – 1 (aet)*	Christchurch Rangers

Petone	2 – 0	Manawatu

South Auckland Rangers	1 – 2	Ellerslie

Waikato United (Hamilton)	1 – 3	North Shore United

Waitakere City	4 – 0	Central United

* Won on penalties by Christchurch Rangers (5-4)

=== Quarter-finals ===
Christchurch Rangers	3 – 2	Petone

Ellerslie	2 – 5	Waitakere City

Miramar Rangers	0 – 3	Roslyn-Wakari

Mount Maunganui	0 – 1	North Shore United

=== Semi-finals ===
North Shore United	4 – 0	Christchurch Rangers

Roslyn-Wakari	1 – 2	Waitakere City

=== Final ===
Waitakere City	4 – 0	North Shore United

McLean Park, Napier
