= 1996 Chatham Cup =

Tournament details
- Venue(s): Park Island Ground, Napier
- Dates: 7 September 1996

Final positions
- Champions: Waitakere City (3rd title)
- Runners-up: Mount Wellington

Awards
- Jack Batty Memorial Cup: Mark Foy (Mount Wellington)

The 1996 Chatham Cup was the 69th annual nationwide knockout football competition in New Zealand.

Up to the last 16 of the competition, the cup was run in three regions (northern, central, and southern), with an open draw from the quarter-finals on. National League teams received a bye until the fourth round (last 32). In all, 127 teams took part in the competition, which consisted of a preliminary round and five rounds proper before quarter-finals, semi-finals, and a final.

== The 1996 final ==
Waitakere City have achieved some league distinctions. They won the league/cup double for a consecutive season and became only the third team to win the Chatham Cup three consecutive seasons (1994, 1995 and 1996).

The Jack Batty Memorial Cup is awarded to the player adjudged to have made to most positive impact in the Chatham Cup final. The winner of the 1996 Jack Batty Memorial Cup was Mark Foy of Mount Wellington.

== Results ==
=== Third round ===
Alexandra	0 – 2	Caversham

Burwood	1 – 7	Christchurch United

Christchurch Technical	2 – 1	Christchurch Rangers

Dunedin Technical	3 – 1	Mosgiel

Eden (Auckland)	4 – 2	Papakura City

Ellerslie	1 – 0	Blockhouse Bay

Glenfield Rovers	5 – 2	Waikato Unicol (Hamilton)

Green Bay-Titirangi	1 – 2	Ngaruawahia United

Green Island	7 – 2	Waihopai (Invercargill)

Lower Hutt City	2 – 1	New Plymouth Rangers

Manawatu (Palmerston North)	1 – 0	Waterside Karori

Manurewa	2 – 2 (aet)*	Lynn-Avon United (Auckland)

Paraparaumu United	3 – 2	Brooklyn Northern United

Petone	2 – 1	Island Bay United

Porirua City	0 – 7	Wainuiomata

Roslyn-Wakari	8 – 0	Queens Park

Seatoun	2 – 3	Taradale

South Auckland Rangers	0 – 3	Mount Wellington

Tararua United (Upper Hutt)	4 – 1	Levin United

Tawa	3 – 0	Stop Out (Lower Hutt)

University (Auckland)	5 – 1	Cambridge

Wanganui East Athletic	1 – 1 (aet)*	Western Suburbs FC (Porirua)

Western (Christchurch)	2 – 1	New Brighton

* Won on penalties by Manurewa (4–3) and Wanganui East (3–2)

=== Fourth round ===
Caversham	1 – 6	Dunedin Technical

Central United (Auckland)	2 – 0	Ellerslie

Christchurch United	2 – 3	Christchurch Technical

Eden	2 – 5	Mount Wellington

Glenfield Rovers	2 – 1	University

Green Island	1 – 2	Roslyn-Wakari

Lower Hutt City	10 – 0	Petone

Miramar Rangers	2 – 0	Tararua United

Napier City Rovers	4 – 0	Paraparaumu United

Ngaruawahia United	8 – 0	Waikato United (Hamilton)

North Shore United	4 – 0	Mount Maunganui

Tawa	4 – 1	Taradale

Wainuiomata	0 – 1	Manawatu

Waitakere City	5 – 0	Manurewa

Wanganui East Athletic	3 – 2	Wellington United

Western	2 – 3	Woolston WMC

=== Fifth round ===
Central United	1 – 2	Mount Wellington

Dunedin Technical	2 – 0	Roslyn-Wakari

Manawatu	2 – 2 (aet)*	Tawa

Ngaruawahia United	0 – 3	Glenfield Rovers

Napier City Rovers	2 – 1	Lower Hutt City

North Shore United	0 – 4	Waitakere City

Wanganui East Athletic	7 – 1	Miramar Rangers

Woolston W.M.C.	0 – 2	Christchurch Technical

* Won on penalties by Tawa (4–2)

=== Quarter-finals ===
Christchurch Technical	1 – 2	Dunedin Technical

Napier City Rovers	4 – 0	Tawa

Waitakere City	4 – 2	Glenfield Rovers

Wanganui East Athletic	2 – 3	Mount Wellington

=== Semi-finals ===
Napier City Rovers	2 – 3	Mount Wellington

Waitakere City	5 – 0	Dunedin Technical

=== Final ===
Waitakere City	3 – 1	Mount Wellington
McClennan, Woodhams, Mulrooney		Hyde

Park Island Ground, Napier
Referee: H. Potter
