= Kate Sheppard Cup =

- Founded: 1994
- Region: New Zealand
- Teams: 52 (in 2025)
- Current champions: Eastern Suburbs (2nd title)
- Most championships: Lynn-Avon United (9 titles)
- Broadcaster: FIFA+ (select games)
- Website: Official website
- 2026 Kate Sheppard Cup

The Kate Sheppard Cup, currently known as the New Zealand Football Foundation Kate Sheppard Cup for sponsorship purposes, is New Zealand's premier knockout tournament in women's association football. Founded in 1994, it was known as the Women's Knockout Cup, until it was renamed in 2018. What would have been the 2020 edition of the competition, was cancelled because of COVID-19 but the competition continued again in 2021.

== Format ==
The Kate Sheppard Cup is a national club based competition, women's teams from all clubs that are members of their regional association affiliated to New Zealand Football are allowed to enter and is competed for during the winter club season. In March each year NZ Football calls for clubs to enter their teams and all teams that have entered shall compete on a knockout basis until two teams remain unbeaten to contest the final in September.

New Zealand football handles the drawing of teams and at the start of the competition teams from within certain Football Federations are drawn against each other to save on travel costs. Football Federations Northern, Auckland and Waikato/Bay of Plenty could be drawn against each other, as could teams from Waikato/Bay of Plenty and Central Football, Central Football and Capital Football, and Mainland Football and Southern Football. The competition becomes an open draw from the semi-final stage with teams being required to travel, at their cost, throughout New Zealand.

== History ==
The Kate Sheppard Cup is New Zealand Footballs women's national club based knockout competition that was first played in 1994 and called the Women's Knockout Cup. The competition starts with regional games until the semi-final then two Northern Region teams will play each other in one semi-final, and the Central Region winner will play the Southern Region winner in the other semi.

The final is usually played as part of a double-header, with the Chatham Cup Final (the men's club teams competition) as part of the traditional ending to the New Zealand football season in September.

The very first game saw Halswell United defeat New Brighton 2–0. The first final took place at Christchurch's English Park and saw local team Nomads United emerge as the first winners of the competition, beating Waikato Unicol on penalties 4–3 after a scoreless final.

The second year of the competition saw Waikato Unicol make the final again but this time winning the competition, before the start of the Northern Region dominance at the expense of Lower Hutt club Petone who in four consecutive finals from 1995 to 1998 finished runners-up.

Three Kings United where the first team to complete a "three-peat" winning the cup from 1997 to 1999 only to be succeeded by Lynn-Avon United who won it five years in a row from 2002 to 2006. They are also the cups most successful team winning the trophy nine times.

On 8 March 2018, coinciding with International Women's Day and in celebration of the 125th anniversary of the women's suffrage movement, which was led by Kate Sheppard who helped women earn the right to vote in New Zealand. The cup was renamed as the Kate Sheppard Cup.

In 2021, the Kate Sheppard Cup saw a record number of 57 teams enter, increasing by 40% from the previous edition.

== Past winners ==
Kate Sheppard Cup finals
Season	Winner	Score	Runner-up	Venue
1994	Nomads United	0–0 won 4–3 on pens	Waikato Unicol	English Park, Christchurch
1995	Waikato Unicol	3–1	Petone	Park Island, Napier
1996	Lynn-Avon United	4–2	Petone	Park Island, Napier
1997	Three Kings United	7–5	Petone	Park Island, Napier
1998	Three Kings United	4–2	Petone	North Harbour Stadium, North Shore
1999	Three Kings United	3–2	Wairarapa United	North Harbour Stadium, North Shore
2000	Lynn-Avon United	6–0	Wairarapa United	North Harbour Stadium, North Shore
2001	Ellerslie AFC	1–0	Lynn-Avon United	North Harbour Stadium, North Shore
2002	Lynn-Avon United	0–0 won 5–3 on pens	Ellerslie AFC	Bill McKinlay Park, Auckland
2003	Lynn-Avon United	4–1	Ellerslie AFC	North Harbour Stadium, North Shore
2004	Lynn-Avon United	1–0	Three Kings United	Fred Taylor Park, Waitakere City
2005	Lynn-Avon United	2–0	Eastern Suburbs	Olympic Park, Auckland
2006	Lynn-Avon United	3–0	Western Springs	Bill McKinlay Park, Auckland
2007	Western Springs	2–1	Glenfield Rovers	Seddon Fields, Auckland
2008	Lynn-Avon United	6–2	Western	North Harbour Stadium, North Shore
2009	Lynn-Avon United	5–1	Claudelands Rovers	North Harbour Stadium, North Shore
2010	Claudelands Rovers	5–4	Three Kings United	North Harbour Stadium, North Shore
2011	Glenfield Rovers	5–4	Coastal Spirit	Memorial Park, Palmerston North
2012	Three Kings United	2–0	Massey University	Newtown Park, Wellington
2013	Coastal Spirit	1–0	Glenfield Rovers	English Park, Christchurch
2014	Glenfield Rovers	3–2	Forrest Hill-Milford United	North Harbour Stadium, North Shore
2015	Glenfield Rovers	4–0	Massey University	Trusts Stadium, Henderson
2016	Forrest Hill-Milford United	2–2 won 4–3 on pens	Glenfield Rovers	North Harbour Stadium, North Shore
2017	Glenfield Rovers	5–4	Eastern Suburbs	North Harbour Stadium, North Shore
2018	Dunedin Technical	4–2	Forrest Hill-Milford United	North Harbour Stadium, North Shore
2019	Eastern Suburbs	4–0	Coastal Spirit	North Harbour Stadium, North Shore
2020	Tournament cancelled due to the COVID-19 pandemic			
2021	Wellington United	1–0	Hamilton Wanderers	North Harbour Stadium, North Shore
2022	Auckland United	1–0	Northern Rovers	North Harbour Stadium, North Shore
2023	Western Springs	2–1	Wellington United	North Harbour Stadium, North Shore
2024	Auckland United	1–0	Western Springs	North Harbour Stadium, North Shore
2025	Auckland United	4–1	Wellington Phoenix Reserves	North Harbour Stadium, North Shore
2026	Eastern Suburbs	3–1	Cashmere Technical	One New Zealand Stadium, Christchurch

=== Maia Jackman Trophy ===
A Maia Jackman Trophy is presented annually to the player adjudged to have made the most positive impact in the Kate Sheppard final. Originally just the Most valuable player trophy, it was renamed in 2013 after Maia Jackman who herself won the MVP trophy in the 1996 and 1998 Women's Knockout Cup finals.

- 1994 – Not Awarded
- 1995 – Not Awarded
- 1996 – Maia Jackman (Lynn-Avon United)
- 1997 – Maria Wilkie (Three Kings United)
- 1998 – Maia Jackman (Three Kings United)
- 1999 – Nicky Smith (Wairarapa United)
- 2000 – Amanda Crawford (Lynn-Avon United)
- 2001 – Priscilla Duncan (Ellerslie)
- 2002 – Yvonne Vale (Lynn-Avon United)
- 2003 – Sara Clapham (Lynn-Avon United)
- 2004 – Melissa Ray (Lynn-Avon United)
- 2005 – Michele Keinzley (Lynn-Avon United)
- 2006 – Ria Percival (Lynn-Avon United)
- 2007 – Nicky Smith (Western Springs)
- 2008 – Kirsty Yallop (Lynn-Avon United)
- 2009 – Katie Hoyle (Lynn-Avon United)
- 2010 – Olivia Chance (Claudelands Rovers)
- 2011 – Steph Skilton (Glenfield Rovers)
- 2012 – Annalie Longo (Three Kings United)
- 2013 – Laura Merrin (Coastal Spirit)
- 2014 – Katie Rood (Glenfield Rovers)
- 2015 – Estelle Harrison (Glenfield Rovers)
- 2016 – Tessa Huntington (Forrest Hill-Milford United)
- 2017 – Kate Loye (Glenfield Rovers)
- 2018 – Shontelle Smith (Dunedin Technical)
- 2019 – Tayla O'Brien and Erinna Wong (Eastern Suburbs)
- 2020 – Not Awarded
- 2021 – Emma Main (Wellington United)
- 2022 – Katie Duncan (Auckland United)
- 2023 – Lily Jervis (Western Springs)
- 2024 – Charlotte Roche (Auckland United)
- 2025 – Chloe Knott (Auckland United)
- 2026 – Erika Skindlov (Eastern Suburbs)

== Performances ==
=== By team ===
Cup winners by teams
Team	Winners	Runners-up	Years won	Years runner-up
Lynn-Avon United	9	1	1996, 2000, 2002–06, 2008–09	2001
Glenfield Rovers	4	3	2011, 2014–15, 2017	2007, 2013, 2016
Three Kings United	4	2	1997–99, 2012	2004, 2010
Auckland United	3	0	2022, 2024, 2025	—
Eastern Suburbs	2	2	2019, 2026	2005, 2017
Western Springs	2	2	2007, 2023	2006, 2024
Ellerslie	1	2	2001	2002–03
Coastal Spirit	1	2	2013	2011, 2019
Forrest Hill-Milford United	1	2	2016	2014, 2018
Waikato Unicol	1	1	1995	1994
Claudelands Rovers	1	1	2009	2010
Wellington United	1	1	2021	2023
Nomads United	1	0	1994	—
Dunedin Technical	1	0	2018	—
Petone	0	4	—	1995, 1996, 1997, 1998
Wairarapa United	0	2	—	1999, 2000
Massey University	0	2	—	2012, 2015
Western	0	1	—	2008
Hamilton Wanderers	0	1	—	2021
Northern Rovers	0	1	—	2022
Wellington Phoenix Reserves	0	1	—	2025
Cashmere Technical	0	1	—	2026

=== By federation ===
Cup winners by Federation
Federation	Winners	Runners-up
Auckland	18	8
Mainland Football	2	4
WaiBOP Football	2	3
Central Football	1	2
Southern Football	1	—
Capital Football	—	7
Northern	—	4

== Sponsorship ==
In 2025, Delivereasy was named as the naming partner for the Kate Sheppard Cup.

== Media coverage ==
In September 2023, New Zealand signed a deal to have selected Kate Sheppard Cup games streamed for free on FIFA+ worldwide.

== See also ==
- National Women's League
