= Amy Wilson =

Amy Wilson may refer to:

- Amy Wilson (artist) (born 1973), American artist
- Amy Wilson (soccer) (born 1980), Australian football player
- Amy Wilson-Hardy (born 1991), English rugby player
