= Wakefield Park (disambiguation) =

Wakefield Park may refer to:

== Australia ==
- One Raceway, formerly Wakefield Park, is a motor racing circuit located near Goulburn

== New Zealand ==
- Wakefield Park, Wellington, a sports ground and public park in Wellington; see 2017 Women's Knockout Cup

== United States ==
- Wakefield Park (Annandale, Virginia), a public park 10 miles on the Capital Beltway outside of Washington D.C.
- Wakefield Park (Wakefield, Massachusetts), listed on the NRHP in Massachusetts
