= House at 32 Morrison Road =

Historic house in Massachusetts, United States

- U.S. National Register of Historic Places
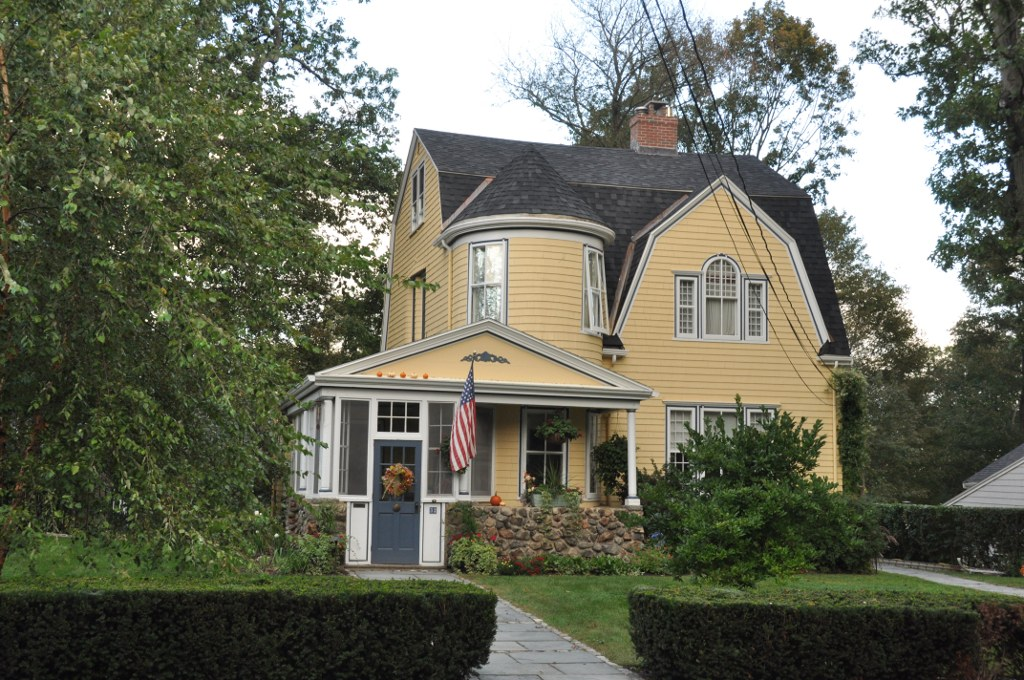
- 32 Morrison Road

- Location within Massachusetts Location within the United States
- Location: 32 Morrison Rd., Wakefield, Massachusetts
- Coordinates: 42°30′1″N 71°5′20″W
- Built: 1906
- Architectural style: Colonial Revival
- MPS: Wakefield MRA
- NRHP reference No.: 89000723
- Added to NRHP: July 06, 1989

The House at 32 Morrison Road in Wakefield, Massachusetts is a well-preserved, architecturally eclectic, house in the Wakefield Park section of town. The 2 1/2-story wood-frame house features a gambrel roof with a cross gable gambrel section. Set in the front gable end is a Palladian window arrangement. The porch has a fieldstone apron, with Ionic columns supporting a pedimented roof. Above the front entry rises a two-story turret with conical roof. The house was built c. 1906–08, as part of the Wakefield Park subdivision begun in the 1880s by J.S. Merrill.

The house was listed on the National Register of Historic Places in 1989.

== See also ==
- National Register of Historic Places listings in Wakefield, Massachusetts
- National Register of Historic Places listings in Middlesex County, Massachusetts
