= Michele Clarke =

Michele Clarke may refer to:

- Michéle Clarke (born 1963), South African politician
- Michèle Pearson Clarke (born 1973), Canadian filmmaker
- Michele Clarke (footballer) (born 1982), New Zealand footballer
