= Mark Foy =

Mark Foy may refer to:

- Mark Foy (footballer) (born 1973), New Zealand football player
- Mark Foy (businessman) (1865–1950), Australian businessman
  - Mark Foy's, a defunct department store in Sydney, New South Wales, Australia
