= Massey University Football Club =

Massey University FC
- Full name: Massey University Football Club
- Nickname: Massey
- Founded: 1948
- Ground: Massey University
- League: Manawatu Division 1
- 2024: Manawatu Division 1, 1st of 9 (champions)
Home colours	Away colours

Massey University Football Club is an amateur football club in Palmerston North, New Zealand. Their top men's and top women's teams play in their respective Central Football Federation League. Their home ground is at the university campus.

== History ==
Established in 1948, Massey spent their first few years playing in the local Manawatū league and University tournaments before they had a more established presence from 1970 onward. Traditionally the club had been for students and ex-students from the local Massey University, but they do welcome players that aren't associated with the University now.

The club's best performing squads have been from 2012 to 2015, who played in the Women's Central League, winning league three consecutive times: 2012, 2013 and 2014. As well as having the league's top goalscorer with Emma Boyack winning the award in 2012 and 2013, then Jane Barnett winning in 2014, they also competed in the national Women's Knockout Cup finishing runners-up in 2012 to Three Kings United and again in 2015 to Glenfield Rovers.

The Men's team won the New Zealand Universities winter tournament in 1970, and are regular contestants in the Chatham Cup, New Zealand's top men's knockout football competition. Their best years in the latter competition were 1986, when they reached the Fifth Round (last 16), and 1987, when they reached the quarter-finals.

== Staff and committee members ==
Following the 2022 MUFC AGM:

- President: Rhys Hardstaff
- Secretary: Sam Bolton
- Treasurer: Donald Piper
- Events: Amy Macaulay

== Coaching staff ==
=== 2022 staff ===
Position	Staff
Men's First Team Head Coach	Donald Piper
Men's First Team Assistant Coach	Adam Miller
Men's First Team Assistant Coach	Zak Brown
Men's First Team Manager	Nick Bailey
Men's Reserve Team Coach	Rhys Hardstaff
Men's Reserve Team Assistant Coach	Ben Porter
Men's Reserve Team Manager	Pat Hendry
Women's First Team Head Coach	Terry Wood
Women's Reserve Team Coach	Ben Mitchell
Women's Reserve Team Assistant Coach	Josh Hawe-Muldrock

== Honours ==
- Women's Central League - 2004, 2012, 2013, 2014
- Women's Knockout Cup runner-up - 2012, 2015
- Kelly Cup - 2013
- Central Football Men's Federation Cup - 2017, 2019, 2021
