= Yvonne Vale =

New Zealand footballer

Personal information
- Full name: Yvonne Vale
- Date of birth: 29 August 1970 (age 56)
- Place of birth: New Zealand
- Position: Goalkeeper

Senior career*
Years	Team	Apps	(Gls)
- Lynn-Avon United

International career
1994–2007	New Zealand	13	(0)

Managerial career
- 2015–: Rutherford College 1st XI Girls
- * Club domestic league appearances and goals

Yvonne Vale (née van Bakel) (born 29 August 1970) is an association football goalkeeper who represented New Zealand at international level.

Vale made her Football Ferns début as a substitute in a 0–1 loss to Russia on 28 August 1994, and finished her international career with 13 caps to her credit.

Vale's son Jordan Vale represented New Zealand at the 2011 FIFA U-17 World Cup.
