= Graham Marshall (footballer) =

New Zealand footballer

Personal information
- Full name: Graham Marshall
- Place of birth: New Zealand

International career
Years	Team	Apps	(Gls)
1995–1997	New Zealand	10	(0)

Graham Marshall is a former association football player who represented New Zealand at international level.

Marshall made his full All Whites debut, a 3–0 win over Singapore on 21 February 1996 and ended his international playing career with 10 A-international caps to his credit, his final cap an appearance in a 1–3 loss to South Korea on 25 January 1997.
