= Mark Cossey =

New Zealand footballer

Personal information
- Full name: Mark Cossey
- Place of birth: New Zealand
- Position: Midfielder

Senior career*
Years	Team	Apps	(Gls)
- Waikato United

International career
1988	New Zealand	2	(0)
- * Club domestic league appearances and goals

Mark Cossey is a former association football player who represented New Zealand at international level.

Cossey played two official A-international matches for the New Zealand in 1988, both against Pacific minnows Fiji, the first a 0–2 loss on 17 November, the second two days later a 0–1 loss on 19 November 1988.
