= Maia Jackman =

New Zealand footballer (born 1975)

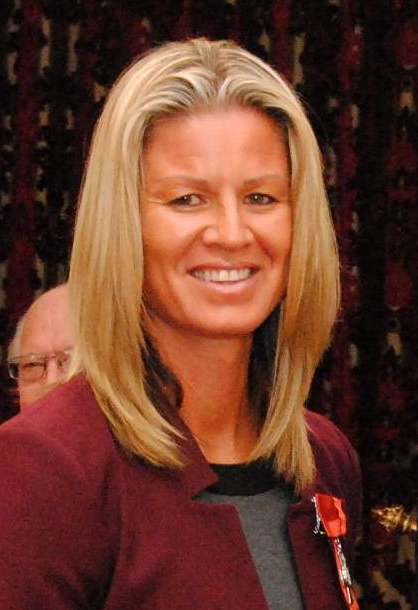
- Jackman in 2013

Personal information
- Full name: Maia Giselle Jackman
- Date of birth: 25 May 1975 (age 51)
- Height: 1.75 m (5 ft 9 in)
- Position: Defender

Team information
- Current team: Western Springs

International career
Years	Team	Apps	(Gls)
1993–2010	New Zealand	50	(12)

Maia Giselle Jackman MNZM (born 25 May 1975) is an association football player who represented New Zealand at international level.

Jackman made her full Football Ferns debut in a 0–0 draw with Canada on 6 August 1993, and represented New Zealand at the 2007 FIFA Women's World Cup finals in China, where they lost to Brazil 0–5, Denmark (0–2) and China (0–2).

In the 2013 New Year Honours, Jackman was appointed a Member of the New Zealand Order of Merit for services to football.

She is currently involved in the development of girls’ and women’s football programs at Takapuna FC. (August 2024)

== International goals ==
No.	Date	Venue	Opponent	Score	Result	Competition
1.	9 October 1998	Auckland, New Zealand	Samoa	19–0	21–0	1998 OFC Women's Championship
2.	7 April 2003	Canberra, Australia	Samoa	1–0	15–0	2003 OFC Women's Championship
3.	7 April 2003	Canberra, Australia	Samoa	3–0	15–0	2003 OFC Women's Championship
4.	7 April 2003	Canberra, Australia	Samoa	7–0	15–0	2003 OFC Women's Championship
5.	7 April 2003	Canberra, Australia	Samoa	11–0	15–0	2003 OFC Women's Championship
6.	9 April 2003	Canberra, Australia	Cook Islands	2–0	9–0	2003 OFC Women's Championship
7.	9 April 2003	Canberra, Australia	Cook Islands	5–0	9–0	2003 OFC Women's Championship
8.	9 April 2003	Canberra, Australia	Cook Islands	6–0	9–0	2003 OFC Women's Championship
9.	11 April 2003	Canberra, Australia	Papua New Guinea	2–0	5–0	2003 OFC Women's Championship
10.	11 April 2003	Canberra, Australia	Papua New Guinea	3–0	5–0	2003 OFC Women's Championship
11.	11 April 2003	Canberra, Australia	Papua New Guinea	4–0	5–0	2003 OFC Women's Championship
12.	1 October 2010	Auckland, New Zealand	Cook Islands	10–0	10–0	2010 OFC Women's Championship
