= Ella Wiebe =

German-born New Zealand footballer

Personal information
- Full name: Ella Wiebe
- Date of birth: 22 July 1978 (age 48)
- Place of birth: Kirgisien, Kant
- Position: Striker

Senior career*
Years	Team	Apps	(Gls)
- Wanganui City

International career^{‡}
2009–	New Zealand	1	(0)
- * Club domestic league appearances and goals ‡ National team caps and goals as of 15 November 2009

Ella Wiebe is a member of the Football Ferns, the New Zealand women's association football team.

Wiebe, born in Germany but now a naturalised New Zealander, made her senior international debut for New Zealand as a substitute in a friendly against Japan on 14 November 2009.
