= Mark Foy (footballer) =

New Zealand footballer (born 1973)

Personal information
- Full name: Mark Foy
- Date of birth: 13 September 1973 (age 53)
- Place of birth: New Zealand
- Position: Striker

Senior career*
Years	Team	Apps	(Gls)
- Roslyn-Wakari
1996	North Shore United		
1996	Mount Wellington		
1996–1998	Gippsland Falcons	50	(6)
1999	Adelaide City	1	(0)

International career
1997–1998	New Zealand	3	(0)
- * Club domestic league appearances and goals

Mark Foy is a former footballer who represented New Zealand at international level and played for Gippsland Falcons and Adelaide City in the Australian National Soccer League.

== Playing career ==
=== Club career ===
Ahead of the 1996 National Summer Soccer League, Foy joined North Shore United.

Playing with Mount Wellington, Foy was the best player in the final of the 1996 Chatham Cup in a 3–1 loss to Waitakere City FC.

Soon after his final appearance, Foy joined Gippsland Falcons in the Australian National Soccer League (NSL), where he played 50 times between 1996 and 1998. At the end of the 1997–98 NSL season, Foy headed to Europe, where he spent time with Bohemians in Ireland and Mainz 05 in Germany.

In February 1999, Foy returned to Australia, joining Adelaide City on a four-week contract. He played for the Zebras in a friendly match against Sanfrecce Hiroshima but was released in March, having played once in the league as a late substitute in a loss to Melbourne Knights.

=== International career ===
In 1996, Foy was a member of the New Zealand team at the 1996 OFC Men's Olympic Qualifying Tournament, scoring five goals.

Foy played three official full internationals for New Zealand, making his debut in a 0–5 loss to Indonesia on 21 September 1997. His other two matches were a 0–0 draw with Chile on 4 February and a 0–1 loss to South Korea on 7 February 1998.
