= Amy Wilson (artist) =

American painter

Amy Wilson (born 1973 in New York City, New York) is an American artist who currently lives and works in Jersey City, New Jersey. She received her BFA from the School of Visual Arts in New York City in 1995, and her MFA from Yale University in 1997. She primarily works with watercolor and pencil on paper, with which she makes books, and sculptures. Her often involves the re-telling of stories from the artist’s life.
