= Waiuku AFC =

- Full name: Waiuku Association Football Club
- Nickname: the Blue Army
- Ground: Massey Park, Waiuku, New Zealand
- Chairman: Frank Leider
- Coach: Pablo Pinto Nuñez
- League: NRF Division 6 South
- 2026: NRF Division 6 South, 2nd of 10
Home colours

Waiuku AFC is an amateur football club in New Zealand. The club competes in the NRF Division 6 South.

While the highest they have played in local competition is NRFL Division 1, they have played in the Chatham Cup, New Zealand's premier knock out tournament a number of times. Their best appearances in the cup was in 2008 and 2015 where they made it to the third round.
