= Bledisloe Park =

Soccer ground in Pukekohe, Auckland, New Zealand

- Interactive map of Bledisloe Park

Ground information
- Location: Pukekohe, New Zealand
- Country: New Zealand
- Coordinates: 37°12′20″S 174°54′08″E
- Establishment: 1950 (first recorded match)

Team information
Northern Districts	(1976–1990)
- As of 3 November 2011; Source: Ground profile

Bledisloe Park is a cricket and football (soccer) ground in Pukekohe, Auckland, New Zealand. It is named after Charles Bathurst, 1st Viscount Bledisloe.

== Cricket ==
The first recorded match held on the ground came in December 1950 when Franklin played King Country in the 1950/51 Hawke Cup. The ground later held two first-class matches which saw Northern Districts play Auckland in the 1976/77 Shell Cup and Wellington in the 1989/90 Shell Trophy. Two List A matches have also been held there, with Northern Districts playing Auckland in the 1977/78 Gillette Cup nd in the 1980/81 Shell Cup.

== Football ==
Bledisloe Park is the home ground for Pukekohe AFC and its clubrooms are located in the Bledisloe Park Sports Centre. The ground is also shared with local club Franklin United, who play some of their games there.
