= Amy Wilson (soccer) =

Australian soccer player

Personal information
- Full name: Amy Sarah Wilson
- Date of birth: 9 June 1980 (age 46)
- Place of birth: Australia
- Position: Midfielder

International career
Years	Team	Apps	(Gls)
2000	Australia		

Amy Wilson (born 9 June 1980) is a former female Australian football midfielder.

She was part of the Australia women's national soccer team at the 2000 Summer Olympics. She retired in 2014.

== See also ==
- Australia at the 2000 Summer Olympics
