= Ken Maunder Park =

Park and sportsground in New Lynn, Auckland, New Zealand

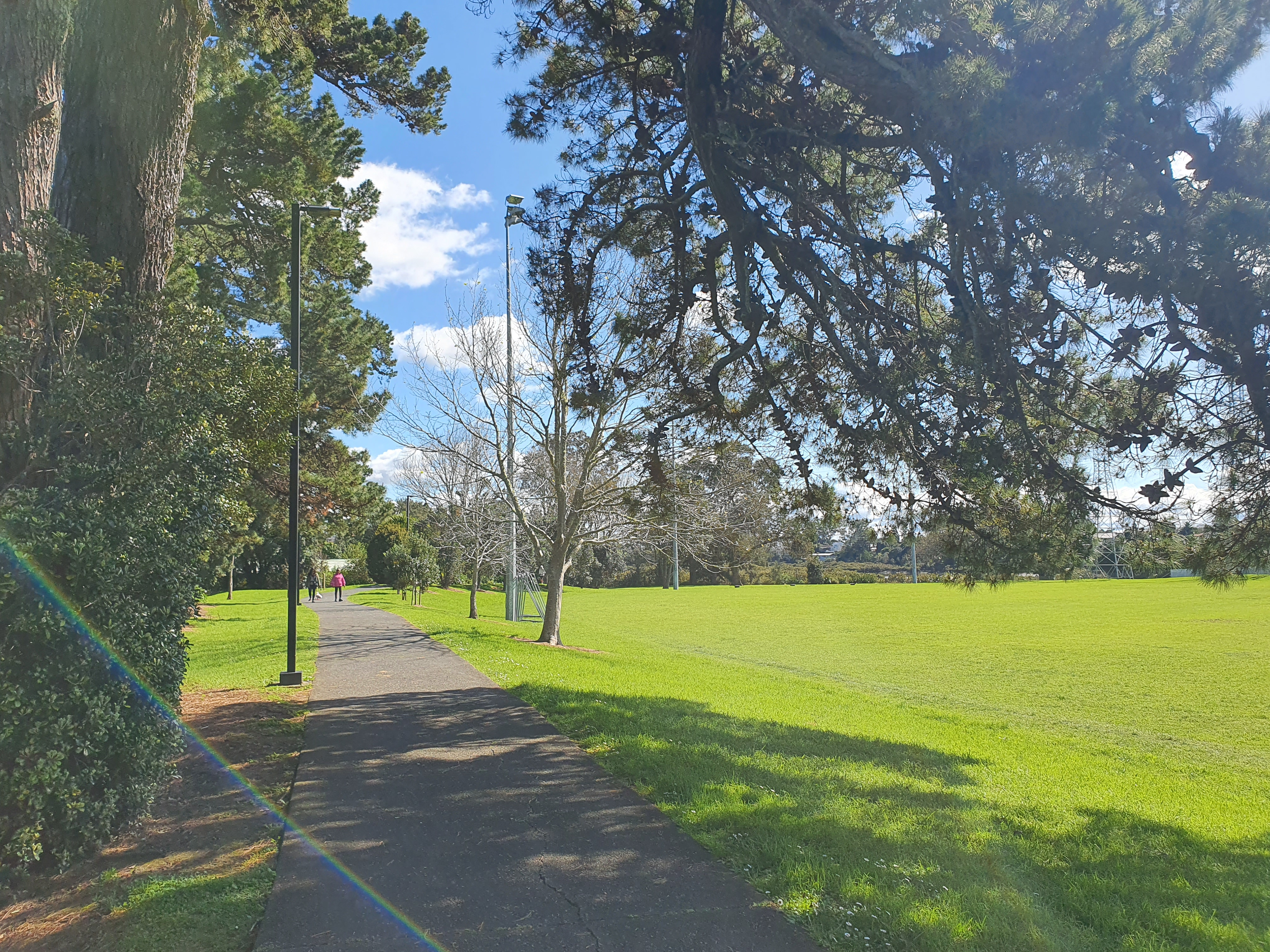
- Type: Urban park
- Location: 34 Binsted Road, New Lynn, Auckland
- Coordinates: 36.90058°S 174.68061°E
- Area: 5.9 acres (2.4 ha)
- Created: 1947
- Operated by: Auckland Council
- Website: Auckland Council

Ken Maunder Park, previously known as Rewa Park is a reserve and sports ground in the suburb of New Lynn in Auckland, New Zealand. It is the home ground of Lynn-Avon United and the Suburbs Cricket Club.

== History ==
The area south-east of Ken Maunder Park was traditionally known to Tāmaki Māori as Kotuitanga, and was an important point along Te Tōanga Waka, the Whau River portage, as this marked the point where the river was no longer navigable by canoe.

In 1852, a farmer Henry Hayr had a cattle run on the land before, in 1854, he brought the original 84 acres from the Crown.

The area became known as “Hayr's Grant” then went through a number of ownership changes and was sub divided a number of times, until in 1887 two brothers Henry and James Binsted who were also butchers, purchased nearly 19 acres of the former ground and set up their own slaughterhouse. The brothers also ran a farm on the land, breeding and selling pedigree Berkshire and Yorkshire pigs. Runoffs from the slaughterhouse caused pollution in the Whau River, adjacent to the site.

A fire in 1916 did damage to the slaughterhouse, and after James Binsted died in 1920, the sheds at New Lynn were dismantled in 1921. From then on, despite plans to subdivide the land, it was used as a tip. Staying in the families hands until 1951 when last surviving trustee Harold Bollard transferred the title to the local council in 1955.

The council decided to call the new reserve “Rewa Park”. By 1956 football fields had been marked out. The New Lynn Cricket Club established clubrooms there in 1961 and in 1963, a bridge was built, linking the park with Queen Mary Avenue.

In 1970, it was decided to rename the Park and the name Ken Maunder Park was chosen. Ken Maunder was a member of the New Lynn Borough Council and included time as deputy mayor of the borough. He was widely active in the local sporting community, including as president of the New Lynn Bowling Club.

== Ground layout ==
In winter all the playing and training fields are grass and the facility is floodlit for night games. There is an indoor training facility as well as Lynn-Avon United clubrooms. During summer, the park, clubrooms and training facility are run by Suburbs Cricket club.

== Gallery ==
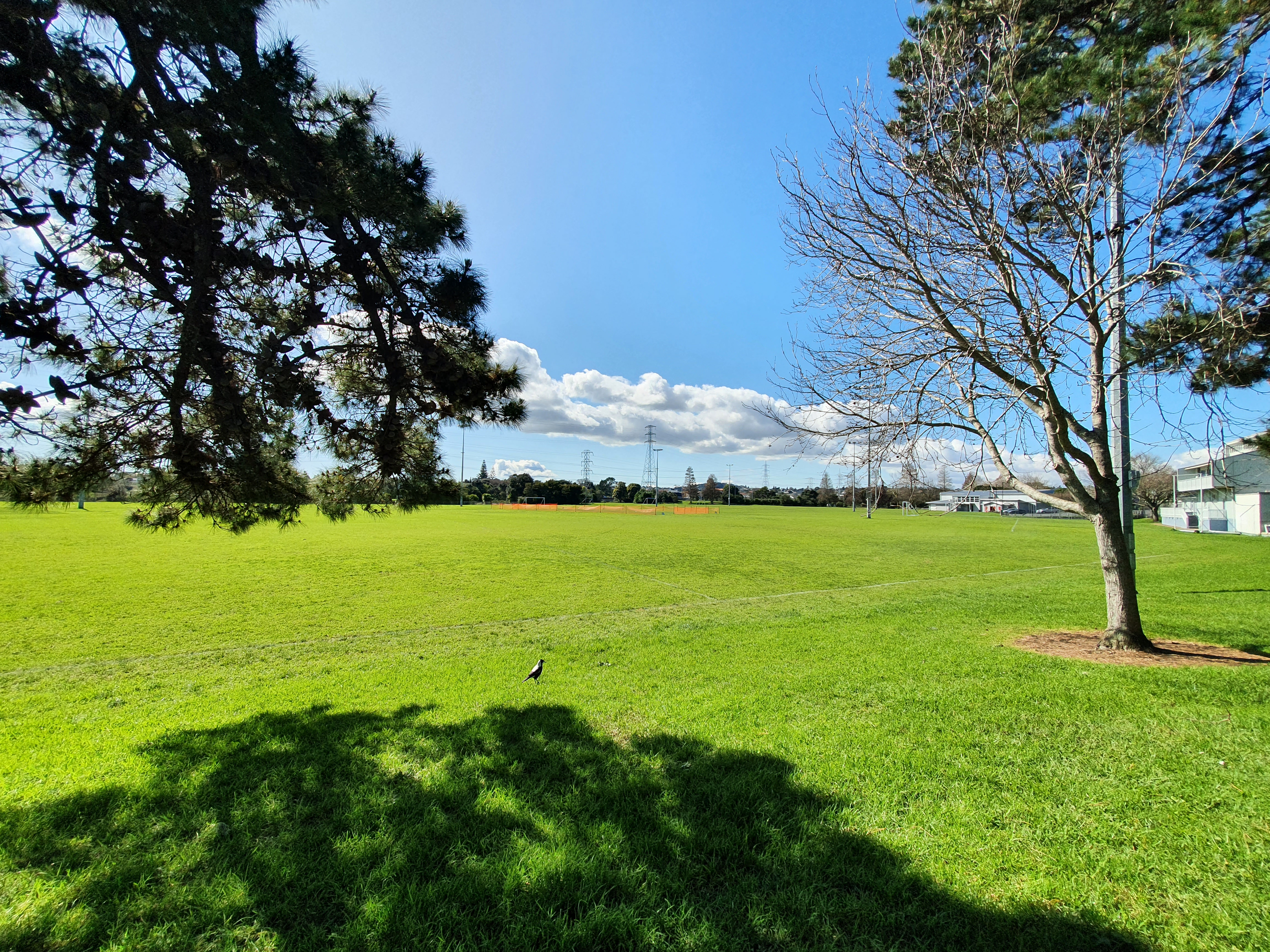
The grounds of Ken Maunder Park

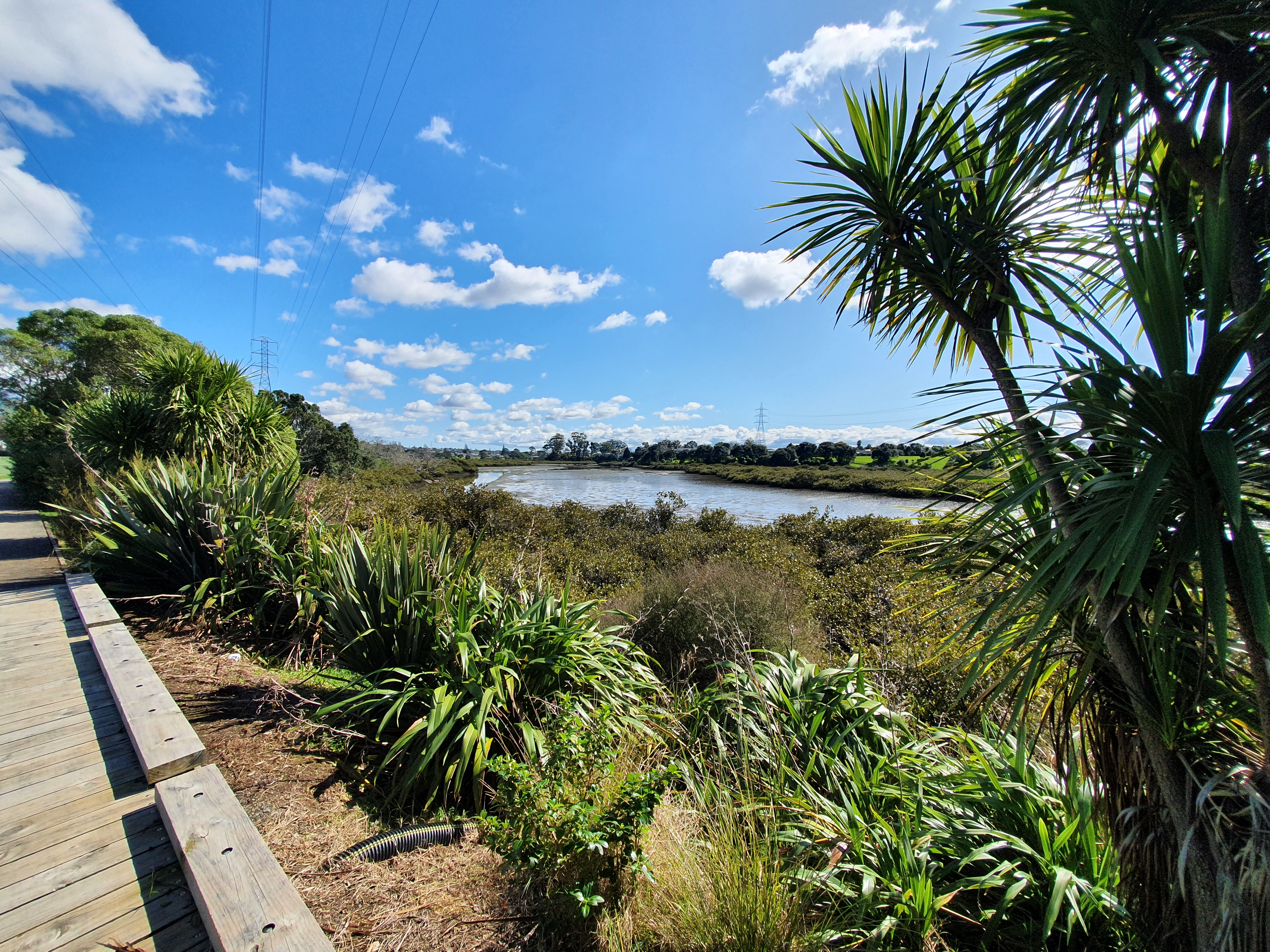
The Whau River, bordering Ken Maunder Park

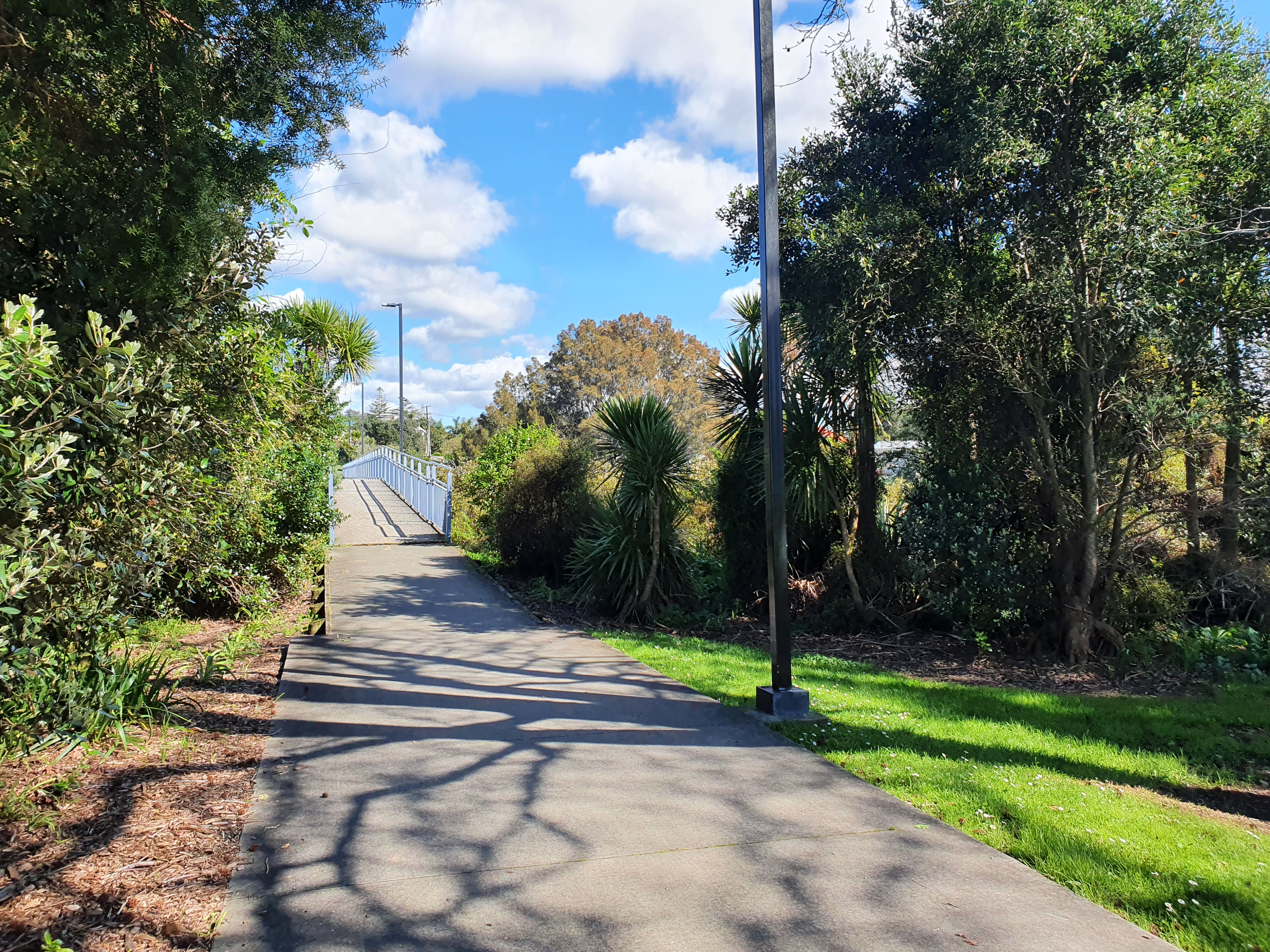
Bridge across the Rewarewa Stream in Ken Maunder Park
