= Elizabeth Milne =

New Zealand footballer

Personal information
- Full name: Elizabeth Caylee Milne
- Date of birth: 11 December 1990 (age 35)
- Place of birth: Wellington, New Zealand
- Height: 1.73 m (5 ft 8 in)
- Position: Defender

Youth career
- 2010–2011: Western Springs Auckland

Senior career*
Years	Team	Apps	(Gls)
2011–2012	Glenfield Rovers		
2012–2013	Perth Glory	12	(1)
2013	Ottawa Fury		
2015–2016	Adelaide United	12	(1)

International career^{‡}
2008–2010	New Zealand U-20	11	(2)
2009–	New Zealand	5	(1)
- * Club domestic league appearances and goals as of 3 November 2016 ‡ National team caps and goals as of 1 October 2010

Elizabeth Caylee Milne (born 11 December 1990) is a New Zealand association football player who last played for Adelaide United in the Australian W-League. She has also represented her country.

Milne was a member of the New Zealand squad in the 2008 FIFA U-20 Women's World Cup playing all 3 group games; a 2–3 loss to Nigeria, a 4–3 win over hosts Chile and a 1–1 draw with England. In 2010, she represented New Zealand at the 2010 FIFA U-20 Women's World Cup in Germany, appearing in one group game.

Milne made her senior Football Ferns debut in a 0–6 loss to China on 10 January 2009
