= Rebecca O'Neill =

New Zealand footballer

Personal information
- Full name: Rebecca O'Neill
- Date of birth: 9 November 1981 (age 44)
- Position: Defender

International career
Years	Team	Apps	(Gls)
2005	New Zealand	1	(0)

Rebecca O'Neill (born 9 November 1981) is a former association football player who represented New Zealand at international level.

O'Neill made a single appearance for Football Ferns in a 0–6 loss to Japan on 21 May 2005.
