= Michele Clarke (footballer) =

New Zealand footballer

Personal information
- Full name: Michele Clarke
- Date of birth: 6 September 1982 (age 44)
- Place of birth: New Zealand

International career
| Years | Team | Apps | (Gls) |
| 2003–2007 | New Zealand | 13 | (2) |

Michele Clarke (née Keinzley) (born 6 September 1982) is an association football player who represented New Zealand at international level.

Clarke came on as a substitute to score a brace on her debut as the Football Ferns thrashed Samoa 15–0 in a World Cup qualifier on 7 April 2003. She finished her international career with 13 caps and two goals to her credit.
