= Wakefield Park Historic District =

Historic district in Massachusetts, United States

- Wakefield Park
- U.S. National Register of Historic Places
- U.S. Historic district
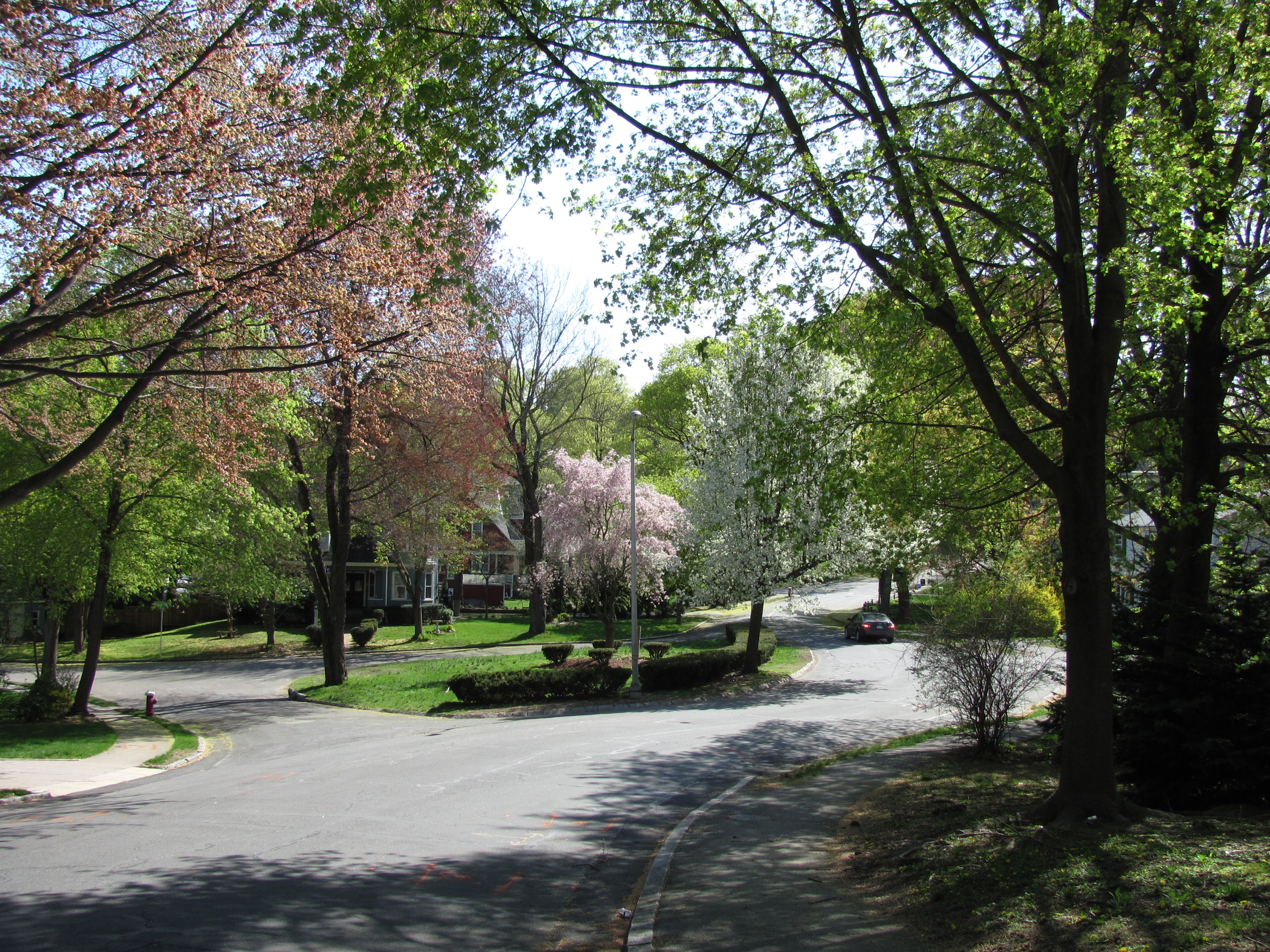
- Park Avenue

- Location within Massachusetts Location within the United States
- Location: Roughly Park Ave. between Summit Ave. and Chestnut St., Wakefield, Massachusetts
- Coordinates: 42°30′3″N 71°5′5″W
- Architectural style: Late 19th And Early 20th Century American Movements, Late 19th And 20th Century Revivals, Late Victorian
- MPS: Wakefield MRA
- NRHP reference No.: 89000755
- Added to NRHP: March 2, 1990

Wakefield Park Historic District is a residential historic district encompassing a portion of a late-19th/early-20th century planned development in western Wakefield, Massachusetts. The district encompasses sixteen properties on 8 acres (3.2 ha) of land out of the approximately 100 acres (40 ha) that comprised the original development. Most of the properties in the district are on Park Avenue, with a few located on immediately adjacent streets.

The Wakefield Park development was laid out 1888 by J. S. Merrill, a local developer, on land southwest of the town center that had been used as farmland until the 1850s. Merrill developed some of the properties himself, and instituted deed restrictions on the sale of lots to ensure that the area would contain only high quality upper-middle-class homes. In the 1890s, when development in the area was at its peak, Merrill partnered with Charles Hanks, who successfully marketed the development as a healthy "garden suburb" alternative to city living.

Architecturally, the houses that were built exhibited a variety of styles popular around the turn of the 20th century, often mixing architectural elements from different styles. One example of this eclecticism is the house at 8 Park Avenue: built c. 1900, it is a 2 1/2-story wood-frame house with a steeply pitched Colonial Revival-style roof, but with an entrance that is stylistically Craftsman/Bungalow. Its corner tower is typical of Queen Anne Victorians. A number of houses, including those at 2 and 4 Park, combine Shingle and Colonial Revival styles, while 24 Park is a more typical Queen Anne Victorian.

The district was listed on the National Register of Historic Places in 1990.

== See also ==
- National Register of Historic Places listings in Wakefield, Massachusetts
- National Register of Historic Places listings in Middlesex County, Massachusetts
