= Martine Puketapu =

New Zealand footballer

Personal information
- Full name: Martine Ella Jane Puketapu
- Date of birth: 16 September 1997 (age 29)
- Place of birth: Auckland, New Zealand
- Height: 1.69 m (5 ft 7 in)
- Position: Striker

College career
Years	Team	Apps	(Gls)
2017–2018	Colorado Buffaloes	40	(11)

Senior career*
Years	Team	Apps	(Gls)
2014–2016	Three Kings United	18+	(27+)

International career^{‡}
2012–2014	New Zealand U17		
2014–2016	New Zealand U20		
2017–	New Zealand	4	(0)
- * Club domestic league appearances and goals ‡ National team caps and goals as of 11:00, 13 June 2019 (UTC)

Martine "Marty" Puketapu was born in Auckland, New Zealand on 16 September 1997 and has represented New Zealand in association football at international level.

== Club career ==
Puketapu played for Three Kings United from Auckland, helping to lead them to a championship in 2016, after scoring 27 goals in 18 games.

== College career ==
Puketapu played in college for Colorado Buffaloes of University of Colorado Boulder. She played 40 matches over 2 seasons and was selected for Pac-12 All-Freshman team in her first year.

== International career ==
Puketapu was a member of the New Zealand U-17 side at the 2012 FIFA U-17 Women's World Cup in Azerbaijan and again at the 2014 FIFA U-17 Women's World Cup in Costa Rica. Puketapu also went to two FIFA U-20 Women's World Cups with the New Zealand U-20 side, the 2014 tournament in Canada and the 2016 tournament in Papua New Guinea.

Puketapu made her senior début as a substitute in a 0–3 loss to Austria on 3 March 2017.
