= Parklands United =

- Full name: Parklands United Sports Club
- Founded: 1967
- Ground: Parklands Reserve, Christchurch
- President: Debbie Newman
- League: Canterbury Championship
- 2026: Canterbury Championship, 6th of 10
Home colours	Away colours

Parklands United Sports Club is a football club in Christchurch, New Zealand. The club competes in the Canterbury Championship.

== History ==
Parklands United was first formed as North Beach Soccer Club in 1967. It was initially formed with the goal of playing social Sunday soccer against hotels and business houses in and around Christchurch. Former coach and administrator Gordon Patterson was one of those that helped run the club from its small hall on Beach Road in New Brighton, Christchurch, New Zealand. It attracted numerous players from the Parklands/Queenspark and New Brighton area and went on to grow and develop into a large size club by the mid-1990s, when the club changed its name to Parklands United in 1996. It was then that the clubhouse moved to its present location in Queenspark, Parklands, Christchurch, New Zealand.

Parklands made a brief appearance in South Island Division One North in 1996, reaching a club high 8th place in 1997 before falling back into division Two. The men currently play in the Canterbury Championship League, while the women's team play in the Canterbury Women's Championship.

== Colours and badge ==
The club's colours are black and yellow.

== Notable Club officials ==
- President: Debbie Newman
- Vice President: Peter Skinley
- Secretary: Sam Bradley
- Club Captain: Ryan Bodger
- Treasurer: Nick James
- Head Football Coach: Hamish Parker

== Records ==
- League victory: 6-0 vs. Ashburton, 1998
- League defeat: 1-7 vs. Northern Hearts, 1998
- Cup Win: 2-1 vs. Waimakariri United, 2015
- Cup Loss: 0-11 vs. Halswell United, 1988
- National League placing: 7th, 1997; Southern League Division One North
