= Norwest United =

- Full name: Norwest United Association Football Club
- Founded: 1984
- Dissolved: 2020
- Ground: Huapai Domain Ground, Auckland, New Zealand

Norwest United AFC was a semi-professional association football club in Auckland, New Zealand. They merged with Waitakere City in 2021 to form West Coast Rangers
