= Forrest Hill Milford United AFC =

- Full name: Forrest Hill Milford United Association Football Club
- Nickname(s): The Swans
- Founded: 1975
- Dissolved: 2020 (merged to become Northern Rovers)
- Ground: Becroft Park, Forrest Hill, North Shore, New Zealand
- League: NRFL Premier
- 2020: 8th
Home colours	Away colours

Forrest Hill Milford United AFC was an amateur association football club from Forrest Hill, New Zealand. They last competed in the Lotto Sport Italia NRFL Premier 2020 season before they merged with Glenfield Rovers to form Northern Rovers.

== History ==
The club was founded in 1975, ever since the club played in local championships and won two NRFL Division 1 titles.

Forrest Hill Milford reached the Quarter-Final of the 2009 Chatham Cup, where they were beaten by eventual champions Wellington Olympic 4–3.

In 2015, Forest Hill won the NRFL Division 1 title, finishing 5 points above 2nd placed Tauranga City United, and gaining promotion to the NRFL Premier.

Again in 2019 the club won the NRFL Division 1 title, so gaining promotion to the 2020 NRFL Premier after being relegated from NRFL Premier in 2017.

In 2020 the club accepted an amalgamation proposal from Glenfield Rovers, to form the new club Northern Rovers, entering competitions from the 2021 season.

== Honours ==
- Lotto Sport Italia NRFL Division 1
  - Champions (2): 2015, 2019

Kate Sheppard Cup
Preceded by Glenfield Rovers	Winner; 2016 Women's Knockout Cup	Succeeded by Glenfield Rovers
