= Western Springs AFC =

Western Springs
- Full name: Western Springs Association Football Club
- Nickname: Springs
- Founded: 1989
- Ground: Seddon Fields, Westmere, Auckland
- Chairman: Warwick Hooper
- Manager: Paul Rutland
- Coach: Ben Bate (HOWF), Scott Hales (HOMF)
- League: National League
- 2026: Northern League, 8th of 12
- Website: https://wsafc.org.nz/
Home colours	Away colours

Western Springs AFC is an association football club in Westmere, Auckland. Western Springs AFC is one of New Zealand's largest clubs. Both the Senior Women's and Senior Men's teams currently play in the National League.

The Western Springs' home ground is at Seddon Field on Meola Road in Westmere and also play home games at Cox's Bay, Walker Park and Eastdale Reserve.

== History ==
The current club was formed in 1989, but its history stretches back to 1924 and the foundation of Comrades FC. This team amalgamated with Grey Lynn FC in 1952, briefly becoming Grey Lynn Comrades United, before renaming to Grey Lynn United in 1954. In 1986 this team combined with the New Zealand branch of the Celtic Supporters Club to form Grey Lynn Celtic. It was this team which combined with Point Chevalier AFC (founded 1949) to become Western Springs Association Football Club in 1989.

== Controversies ==
In May 2023, the women's team had a game postponed and played several games in kits with no logos due to ongoing disputes with the club. Players said they felt "completely disrespected" by the "highly misogynistic behaviour" of the predominantly male board.

The women's team decided not to play their match on 19 May in solidarity with their former manager Ryan Faithful who was sacked a week earlier. Faithful had supposedly stood with the players in their fight for equality. Players said they were constantly pushed to the side to accommodate the men's team. The women's team were also unhappy with the men getting paid up to 8 times the women's team and having double the funding despite not qualifying for the national league like their female counterparts. Football Fern Claudia Bunge said it was "sad to see the lack of support they're getting" and that in the lead up to a FIFA Women's World Cup, "it's not good enough". Bunge said "clubs need to be doing more."

As part of the women's teams frustrations with the club, the players were unhappy with the "phallic like" logo requesting it to be replaced. The New Zealand Herald states an artist was called in to refresh the logo. Jim Jacobs, the designer of the original logo, said he was surprised to hear the claims of the "phallic like" logo, which was based on Tottenham Hotspur's logo.

Reports by the New Zealand Herald state targets were set by the club in December 2022 after receiving $461,755 for upgrades as a 2023 FIFA Women's World Cup training base. This includes females having equal access to facilities and support from the club. The club also set out to have "equal representation of genders in imagery used by the club".

Independent mediators were called in to help settle an agreement between the club and the women's first starting on 30 May. In June 2023 an agreement was reached between the women's first team and the club. The club agreed to increasing the women's team expenses to match the men's expenses, recruit a new head of girl's and women's football, while also engaging an independent advisor to develop the club's programme development strategy. Western Springs also agreed a commitment to "equality, diversity and player representation on club committees". Players were "relieved" and "proud" to have reached an agreement with the club.

== Current squad ==
As of 13 June 2021

Note: Flags indicate national team as defined under FIFA eligibility rules; some limited exceptions apply. Players may hold more than one non-FIFA nationality.

No.	Pos.	Nation	Player
1	GK	NZL	Liam Gilbert
3	DF	NZL	Finn Cochran
4	DF	SAM	Faitalia Hamilton-Pama
5	DF	NZL	Bradley Thomas
6	DF	ETH	Amanuel Molla
7	MF	NZL	Roderick Lockhart
8	MF	ESP	Gerard Garriga
9	MF	NZL	Dane Schnell
10	FW	NZL	Kayne Vincent
11	DF	NZL	Oscar Browne
12	DF	NZL	Josh Margetts
14	DF	NZL	Zac Zoricich

No.	Pos.	Nation	Player
15	DF	SAM	Niko Steinmetz
17	FW	NZL	Wade Molony
18	DF	FIJ	Samuela Kautoga
19	FW	ENG	Dawson Straffon
20	MF	NZL	Dean Lausev
21	FW	NZL	Aiden Iqbal
22	GK	NZL	Elliot Munford
23	MF	NZL	Theo McIntosh
24	GK	NZL	Joe Wallis
26	MF	JPN	Kenta Nakashima
51	FW	NZL	Kaea Rangihaeata

Men's Head Coach: Scott Hales

Women's Head Coach: Ben Bate

== Past and Present day internationals ==
Women's senior internationals include Football Ferns:

- Rosie White
- Maia Jackman
- Rebecca O'Neill
- Priscilla Duncan
- Abby Erceg
- Daisy Cleverley
- Sarah Morton
- Elizabeth Anton
- Nadia Olla

Men's senior internationals include All Whites:

- Myer Bevan
- Sam Brotherton.

Kate Sheppard Cup
Preceded by Lynn-Avon United	Winner; 2007 Women's Knockout Cup	Succeeded by Lynn-Avon United
Preceded by Auckland United	Winner; 2023 Kate Sheppard Cup	Succeeded by Auckland United
