= Glenfield Rovers =

- Full name: Glenfield Rovers AFC & Sports Club Inc.
- Nickname: Rovers
- Founded: April 1960
- Dissolved: 2020 (merged to become Northern Rovers)
- Ground: McFetridge Park, Archers Road, Glenfield, Auckland
- Capacity: 2000
- League: NRFL Division 1
- 2020: 5th
- Website: http://www.glenfieldrovers.org.nz
Home colours

Glenfield Rovers was a semi-professional football club based in Glenfield, New Zealand. The men's team competed in the NRFL Division 1 in 2020, having suffered relegation from the NRFL Premier in 2019. The women's team competed in the NRFL Women's Premier League, finishing 2nd with 40 points in the 2019 season.

== History ==
In 1960 Glenfield Rovers began as the "Chelsea Sugar Refinery" football team. It was then reformed under the guidance of Fons Scheirlinck and permitted to play Sunday football. In 1961, Chelsea Association Football Club was formed from the refinery team and affiliated to the Auckland Football Association. In 1963, Chelsea A.F.C. was renamed as Glenfield Rovers A.F.C. and moved to its current home today of McFetridge Park.

In 2020 the club put an amalgamation proposal forward to members to merge with Forrest Hill Milford. The vote passed 86.5% in favor and the amalgamation between the two clubs began as the new, Northern Rovers.

Today the club has a two-level clubrooms consisting of a formal lounge, fully licensed bar and kitchen, thirteen changing rooms, four full size fields of which three are fully floodlit, an 85-car capacity car park and 200-person grandstand.

The main local rival was Birkenhead United and was viewed by many as the biggest rivalry in New Zealand football.

1000 members enjoy a variety of levels of football in the winter season which include 18 midget teams, 13 junior and 8 youth teams, 18 senior men's teams and 4 senior women's teams. A further 1000 enjoy the summer sevens, which runs Wednesday and Friday nights from Labour weekend to Easter weekend. Summer sevens was the first of its kind in Auckland, playing on a third of a field, with small goals and seven players on the field.

For many years, Glenfield Rovers was the only North Shore club with a Premier Women’s team and has maintained a long-standing presence in women’s football.

The midget programme is run on a Friday night which enables members to enjoy other winter sports as well and gives children the novelty of playing under floodlights. The junior and youth teams as well as most of the senior teams play in the Northern and Auckland Football Federation competitions in a season which lasts from early April through to late August.

== Honours ==
Men's Premier Team League Honours:
1965 – Northern League Division Two B
1976 – Northern League Division Two
1987 – Northern League Division Two
1996 – Northern League Division One, Chatham Cup Quarter Finals
2002 – Northern Premier League
2003 – Northern Premier League
2008 – Chatham Cup Semi Finals
2010 – Chatham Cup Quarter Finals
2013 – Northern League Division One
2014 – Northern Premier League

Women's Premier Team Honours:
1989 – Northern Women's League Division One
1991 – AWFA Knockout Shield runners-up
2007 – National Women's Knockout Cup runners-up
2010 – Northern Premier Women's League
2011 – National Women's Knockout Cup winner, Northern Premier Women's League, Northern Premier Women's League Cup
2013 – National Women's Knockout Cup runners-up
2014 – National Women's Knockout Cup winners
2015 – National Women's Knockout Cup winners
2016 – National Women's Knockout Cup runners-up
2017 – Kate Sheppard Women's Knockout Cup Winners

Kate Sheppard Cup
Preceded by Claudelands Rovers	Winner; 2011 Women's Knockout Cup	Succeeded by Three Kings United
Preceded by Coastal Spirit	Winner; 2014 Women's Knockout Cup	Succeeded by Glenfield Rovers
Preceded by Glenfield Rovers	Winner; 2015 Women's Knockout Cup	Succeeded by Forrest Hill-Milford United
Preceded by Forrest Hill-Milford United	Winner; 2017 Women's Knockout Cup	Succeeded by Dunedin Technical
