= Wairarapa United =

- Full name: Wairarapa United Football Club
- Founded: 1996 (amalgamation)
- Ground: Solway Showgrounds, Masterton
- Capacity: 1000
- Chairman: Holly Barnard (Rausch)
- Manager: Patrick Wootton
- League: Women's Capital Prem
- 2025: Women's Capital Prem
- Website: www.wairarapaunited.co.nz
| Home colours | Away colours |

Wairarapa United Football Club is based in Masterton, New Zealand. WUFC Women's Firsts are the region's premiere senior female team who finished 2nd on the table in 2024 in the Capital Football Women's 1 League, gaining promotion to Cap Prem in 2025 due to a restructure of grades.

In 2025 the club will field one additional women's side in the Wairarapa local league as well as junior U12 team in the Wellington Junior league. The club also fields an under-19 side competing successfully in the national Napier tournament.

== Club history ==
The club was formed by the merger of Masterton and Carterton in 1996; a composite team that started to dominate Women's football winning the league in 2000 and 2002. The team was coached by Wendi Henderson and competed in the New Zealand Knockout Cup, finishing runners up in 1999 and 2000.

In the 2000s, the club focused on the men's game, competing in the Capital Football Men's Central League 2009–2021. In Wairarapa's first season in the Central League, the club finished sixth in the league. Wairarapa's highest finish in the league is third place which they achieved in both 2010 and 2011. The club defeated four-time champions Napier Rovers 2–1 to win the Chatham Cup in 2011, their first appearance in the final.

In 2013 Wairarapa United switched their home ground; from Howard Booth Park in Carterton for the 2013 Central Premier League season, to play at Memorial Park in Masterton.

For 2023 the WUFC will play at Hullena Park, Te Whiti Road, Masterton.

== Major honours ==
- Chatham Cup: 2011
- Rod Pelosi Challenge Trophy: 2008
- Capital Football Div One: 2005

== International players ==
The following players made an international cap while playing for Wairarapa United

- (Vanuatu) Seule Soromon
- (Fiji) Pita Rabo
- (Vanuatu) Brian Kaltack

== Notes ==
Chatham Cup
| Preceded by Miramar Rangers | Winner; 2011 Chatham Cup | Succeeded by Central United |
