= Lynn-Avon United AFC =

- Full name: Lynn-Avon United Association Football Club
- Founded: 1996 (re-amalgamation of teams which split in 1947)
- Ground: Ken Maunder Park, New Lynn, Auckland
- Coach: Richard Beeston (Head Coach)
- League: NRF Division 3
- 2026: NRF Division 3, 4th of 10
Home colours	Away colours

Lynn-Avon United is a semi-professional association football club based in New Lynn, Auckland, New Zealand. Their first team plays in the NRF Division 3.

== History ==
The club was formed in 1996 through an amalgamation of Lynndale (originally Lyndale) AFC and Avondale United. These two teams had a common origin, Lynndale having split from Avondale FC in 1947. Avondale later changed their name to Red Shield and then Avondale United.

== Present day ==
Former player for Wycombe Wanderers and the New Zealand Knights player Sean Devine, who lead Exeter City to a 0–0 with Manchester United at Old Trafford in a 2005 English FA Cup tie, captains the Lotto Sport Italia NRFL Division 1B side.

Kate Sheppard Cup
Preceded by Waikato Unicol	Winner; 1996 Women's Knockout Cup	Succeeded by Three Kings United
Preceded by Three Kings United	Winner; 2000 Women's Knockout Cup	Succeeded by Ellerslie
Preceded by Ellerslie	Winner; 2002 Women's Knockout Cup	Succeeded by Lynn-Avon United
Preceded by Lynn-Avon United	Winner; 2003 Women's Knockout Cup	Succeeded by Lynn-Avon United
Preceded by Lynn-Avon United	Winner; 2004 Women's Knockout Cup	Succeeded by Lynn-Avon United
Preceded by Lynn-Avon United	Winner; 2005 Women's Knockout Cup	Succeeded by Lynn-Avon United
Preceded by Lynn-Avon United	Winner; 2006 Women's Knockout Cup	Succeeded by Western Springs
Preceded by Western Springs	Winner; 2008 Women's Knockout Cup	Succeeded by Lynn-Avon United
Preceded by Lynn-Avon United	Winner; 2009 Women's Knockout Cup	Succeeded by Claudelands Rovers
