= 1983 Chatham Cup =

Tournament details
- Venue(s): Childers Road Reserve, Gisborne; Replay: Bill McKinlay Park, Auckland
- Dates: 18 September 1983 (replay 20 September)

Final positions
- Champions: Mount Wellington (4th title)
- Runners-up: Gisborne City

The 1983 Chatham Cup was the 56th annual nationwide knockout football competition in New Zealand.

Early stages of the competition were run in three regions (northern, central, and southern), with the National League teams receiving a bye until the fourth round of the competition. In all, 139 teams took part in the competition. Note: Different sources give different numberings for the rounds of the competition: some start round one with the beginning of the regional qualifications; others start numbering from the first national knock-out stage. The former numbering scheme is used in this article.

== The 1983 final ==
The final was played at the home ground of Gisborne City, one of the two finalists. The replay was at the home ground of the other finalist, Mount Wellington.

Mount Wellington appeared in their fifth consecutive final - the only club to have achieved this feat up until this time (it has since also been achieved by Christchurch United, between 1987 and 1991). Mount players Tony Sibley and Ron Armstrong joined an elite group to have played in four Chatham Cup-winning sides, having previously played in Mount Wellington's victories in 1973, 1980, and 1982.

The first match was a gritty, evenly matched affair, with any superiority which Mount Wellington may have had largely counteracted by the efforts of the vocal East Coast spectators. Fred de Jong opened the scoring for the Aucklanders after 14 minutes, only for Colin Walker to equalise halfway through the first half. In the second period Walker put the East Coasters ahead, and they held the advantage until the dying minutes when Keith Nelson, scorer of the only goal in the 1982 final, scored for the Mount to level the tie. Gisborne held on during extra time despite the Mount dominating the extra half-hour.

The replay, under floodlights at Mount Wellington's ground, was far less balanced. The Mount took the lead on the half-hour mark with a John Price penalty, and the game was put firmly out of Gisborne's reach just before the final whistle by a shot from Nelson.

== Results ==
=== Third Round ===
Cashmere Wanderers	3 – 1	Christchurch Technical

Central City (Palmerston North)	0 – 2	Rose City (Palmerston North)

Clendon United	0 – 4	East Coast Bays

Eden	0 – 0*	Oratia United

Hamilton	1 – 2	Ellerslie

Havelock North Wanderers	3 – 2	Masterton

Island Bay United	3 – 1	North Wellington

Massey University	1 – 3	Wellington City

Metro College	0 – 1	Blockhouse Bay

Mount Roskill	1 – 1*	Papakura City

North End United	1 – 0	Green Island

Otahuhu United	0 – 4	Waitemata City

Porirua United	7 – 3	Victoria University

Queens Park (Invercargill)	0 – 2	Invercargill Thistle

Raumati Hearts	2 – 3	Waterside

Rotorua City	0 – 1	Takapuna City

Rotorua Suburbs	0 – 1	Mount Maunganui

Shamrock (Christchurch)	1 – 2	Woolston WMC

Viard Old Boys (Porirua)	8 – 2	Horowhenua CPFP

Western (Christchurch)	2 – 1	Christchurch HSOB

* Won on penalties by Oratia United (3–0) and Mount Roskill (5–4)

=== Fourth Round ===
Cashmere Wanderers	2 – 4	Christchurch United

Dunedin City	8 – 0	North End United

Dunedin Technical	7 – 0	Invercargill Thistle

East Coast Bays	2 – 3	Mount Wellington

Ellerslie	1 – 0	Papatoetoe

Gisborne City	4 – 0	Havelock North Wanderers

Island Bay United	2 – 3	Wellington City

Manurewa	3 – 0	Blockhouse Bay

Mount Maunganui	3 – 1	Mount Roskill

Napier City Rovers	4 – 2	Waterside

North Shore United	3 – 0	Oratia United

Rose City	2 – 0	Porirua United

Takapuna City	2 – 1	Waitemata City

Viard Old Boys	1 – 2	Nelson United

Wellington Diamond United	0 – 1	Miramar Rangers

Western	0 – 3	Woolston WMC

=== Fifth Round ===
Christchurch United	3 – 2	Dunedin Technical

Dunedin City	3 – 0	Woolston W.M.C.

Gisborne City	3 – 1	Wellington City

Manurewa	3 – 0	Takapuna City

Mount Maunganui	2 – 4	North Shore United

Mount Wellington	2 – 0	Ellerslie

Napier City Rovers	2 – 2 (aet)*	Rose City

Nelson United	1 – 3	Miramar Rangers

* Napier City Rovers won 4–1 on penalties.

=== Quarter-finals ===
Dunedin City	2 – 0	Miramar Rangers

Gisborne City	1 – 0	Christchurch United

Manurewa	0 – 0 (aet)*	Mount Wellington

North Shore United	1 – 0	Napier City Rovers

* Mount Wellington won 5–4 on penalties.

=== Semi-finals ===
Mount Wellington	4 – 0	Dunedin City

North Shore United	0 – 1	Gisborne City

=== Final ===
18 September 1983

Mount Wellington	2 – 2 (aet)	Gisborne City
de Jong, Nelson		Walker ×2

Childers Road Reserve, Gisborne
Referee: A. Edwards

==== Replay ====
20 September 1983

Mount Wellington	2 – 0	Gisborne City
Price, Nelson

Bill McKinlay Park, Auckland
Referee: A. Edwards
