= 1990 Chatham Cup =

Tournament details
- Venue(s): Basin Reserve, Wellington
- Dates: 16 September 1990

Final positions
- Champions: Mount Wellington (5th title)
- Runners-up: Christchurch United

Awards
- Jack Batty Memorial Cup: Michael McGarry (Christchurch United)

The 1990 Chatham Cup was the 63rd annual nationwide knockout football competition in New Zealand.

Up to the last 16 of the competition, the cup was run in three regions (northern, central, and southern). National League teams received a bye until the final 64 stage. In all, 147 teams took part in the competition.

== The 1990 final ==
The final returned to the Cup's early home, the Basin Reserve. It was the first to be decided on penalties. Replays, which had been used in previous tied finals, were no longer used in the Chatham Cup by 1990. The final was close and tense, with three goals to each team. Mount Wellington finished the match with ten men after Dave Witteveen was sent off late in the second half. Johan Verweij scored in his fourth successive final - unfortunately for him, in the 1990 final it was an own goal. The penalty shoot-out was no less tense, with several shots having to be retaken.

Mount Wellington and Christchurch United were as evenly matched in the 1990 final as they had been when they met in the epic 1972 Chatham Cup final. That match produced thirteen goals spread across three matches, with eight in the first match alone. The 1990 final was equally exciting, with records being set and plenty of on-pitch action. Among the records were those of Ron Armstrong, who played in his eighth final - equally Tony Sibley with a record which stood alongside father Ken Armstrong's earlier cup heroics as player and coach.

The first half produced three goals. Allan Carville led the way for the southerners, before a wayward backpass from Verweij caught the wind and beat his own keeper to level things up. The Mount took the lead for the first time with a fine curving shot from Noel Barkley, 1990 New Zealand player of the year. From this point on, Christchurch went on the attack, mainly through the efforts of Michael McGarry, but they only produced one goal to show for it, a second for Carville.

Extra time produced more excitement, with a missed penalty from United's skipper Keith Braithwaite. Then in the dying stages, referee Roger Woolmer game a free kick to Mount Wellington close to the Christchurch goal. Keeper Alan Stroud could only parry the ball, and Armstrong stuck the ball home. Christchurch fought back, and with only seconds remaining McGarry deflected a Julyan Falloon cross into the Mount's net.

And so it came down to penalties. Mount Wellington scored with four of their five efforts, from Terry Torrens, Noel Barkley, Grant Lightbown, and Steve O'Donoghue. The only Aucklander failing to find the net was Ron Armstrong, thanks to a fine save from Stroud. It was the Christchurch United kicks which produced the most drama, however. McGarry failed to find the target, and keeper Paul Schofield saved Braithwaite's effort, only to hear the referee calling for it to be retaken, as Schofield had moved. Braithwaite scored from the retaken kick. More was to come, with Verweij's kick having to be retaken not once but twice for the same offence - and Schofield saved on all three occasions. Though Michael Boomer scored with Christchurch's fourth kick, the lead became unassailable after O'Donoghue made it 4–2 for the Mount.

The Jack Batty Memorial Trophy for player of the final was awarded to Michael McGarry of Christchurch United. McGarry became the first player to win this award twice, having also won it in 1989.

== Results ==
=== Third Round ===
Burndale United (Christchurch)	3 – 2	Christchurch Technical

Caversham	2 – 0	Mosgiel

Claudelands Rovers	2 – 3	East Coast Bays

Gisborne City	2 – 0	Red Sox (Palmerston North)

Glenfield Rovers	0 – 1	Waikato United (Hamilton)

Hawera	1 – 10	Napier City Rovers

Howick	1 – 2	Mount Albert-Ponsonby

Lower Hutt City	5 – 0	Riverside (Palmerston North)

Manurewa	5 – 0	Takapuna City

Wellington Marist	1 – 2	Wanganui East Athletic

Melville (Hamilton)	5 – 1	Onehunga-Mangere United

Metro (Auckland)	0 – 2	Mount Roskill

Miramar Rangers	2 – 0	Mana United (Porirua)

Mount Wellington	3 – 0	Ellerslie

Nelson United	2 – 0	Havelock North Wanderers

New Plymouth Old Boys	2 – 0	Wellington Olympic

Ngaruawahia United	3 – 3 (aet)*	Green Bay-Titirangi

North End United (Dunedin)	0 – 7	Roslyn-Wakari

North Shore United	3 – 0	Eden (Auckland)

North Wellington	0 – 1	Stop Out (Lower Hutt)

Oratia United	1 – 0	Mount Maunganui

Raumati Hearts	1 – 3	Hutt Valley United

Tararua United (Upper Hutt)	0 – 2	Taradale

Waihopai (Invercargill)	3 – 0	Grants Braes (Dunedin)

Wainuiomata	1 – 0	Waterside Karori

Waitakere City	2 – 1	Papakura City

Wellington United	1 – 0	Massey University

Western (Christchurch)	1 – 2	Christchurch Rangers

Western Springs	2 – 1	Rotorua City

Woolston WMC	3 – 1	Halswell United

* Won on penalties by Ngaruawahia (4–3)

Christchurch United received a bye to the Fourth Round

=== Fourth Round ===
Christchurch Rangers	0 – 3	Christchurch United

East Coast Bays	5 – 0	Melville

Miramar Rangers	2 – 0	Wellington United

Mount Albert-Ponsonby	4 – 3	Western Springs

Napier City Rovers	0 – 2	Hutt Valley United

Nelson United	3 – 1	New Plymouth Old Boys

Ngaruawahia United	1 – 2	Mount Roskill

North Shore United	0 – 1	Waikato United

Oratia United	2 – 4	Mount Wellington

Roslyn-Wakari	2 – 2 (aet)*	Waihopai

Taradale	1 – 2	Lower Hutt City

Wainuiomata	3 – 1	Stop Out

Waitakere City	3 – 0	Manurewa

Wanganui East Athletic	1 – 1 (aet)*	Gisborne City

Woolston WMC	0 – 2	Burndale United

* Won on penalties by Roslyn-Wakari (6–5) and Gisborne City (6–5)

Caversham received a bye to the Fifth Round

=== Fifth Round ===
Burndale United	2 – 0	Caversham

Lower Hutt City	2 – 4	Gisborne City

Miramar Rangers	1 – 2	Hutt Valley United

Mount Albert-Ponsonby	0 – 3	Waikato United

Mount Roskill	1 – 4	Waitakere City

Mount Wellington	2 – 0	East Coast Bays

Roslyn-Wakari	3 – 5	Christchurch United

Wainuiomata	1 – 0	Nelson United

=== Sixth Round ===
Gisborne City	0 – 1	Burndale United

Childers Rd
Referee: S de Boer

Mount Wellington	2 – 1	Waikato United

Wainuiomata	1 – 2	Christchurch United

Waitakere City	1 – 2	Hutt Valley United

=== Semi-finals ===
Christchurch United	1 – 0	Burndale United

Mount Wellington	4 – 2 (aet)	Hutt Valley United

=== Final ===
16 September 1990

Mount Wellington	3 – 3 (aet)	Christchurch United
Verweij (o.g.), Barkley, Armstrong		Carville 2, McGarry

Basin Reserve, Wellington
Referee: Roger Woolmer

Penalty shootout:

Mount Wellington: Armstrong (saved), Torrens (scored), Barkley (scored), Lightbown (scored), O'Donoghue (scored)
Christchurch United: McGarry (missed), Braithwaite (scored), Verweij (saved), Boomer (scored)

Mount Wellington won 4–2 on penalties.

== Sources ==
- Hilton, T. (1991) An association with soccer. Auckland: The New Zealand Football Association. ISBN 0-473-01291-X.
- Rec.Sport.Soccer Statistics Foundation New Zealand 1990 page
- UltimateNZSoccer website 1990 Chatham Cup page
