= 2026 Chatham Cup =

Tournament details
- Country: New Zealand
- Dates: 25 April 2026 – 5 September 2026
- Teams: 121

Final positions
- Champions: Fencibles United
- Runners-up: Cashmere Technical

Awards
- Jack Batty Cup: Yoichi Kawachi

The 2026 Chatham Cup was New Zealand's 98th annual knockout football competition. It was sponsored by Delivereasy and known as the Delivereasy Chatham Cup for sponsorship reasons.

It had a preliminary round and four rounds proper before quarter-finals, semi-finals, and a final.

== Results ==
=== Preliminary round ===
Number of teams per tier still in competition
Tier 1+2 (Note: Seven Southern League teams joined in the first round. All Northern and Central League teams joined the competition in the second round along with the remaining Southern League teams.)	Tier 3	Tier 4	Tier 5, 6, 9	Sunday League	Total
31 / 31	38 / 38	22 / 22	24 / 24	6 / 6	121 / 121

Northern Region

25 April 2026	Uni-Mount Bohemian (6)	2–1	Hillcrest United (6)	Mount Wellington
13:00	Berghaus 11', 90'	Report	Lawson 48'	Stadium: Bill McKinlay Park; Referee: James Portegys

25 April 2026	West Auckland (5)	2–1 (a.e.t.)	Papakura City (5)	Kelston
14:00	Kumar 90+3'; Harland 119'	Report	Ashby-Peckham 90+5'	Stadium: Onewherowhero / Brains Park; Referee: Charlie Brown

25 April 2026	Papatoetoe (5)	6–0	Huntly Thistle (5)	Papatoetoe
14:00	Sharma 31'; Kumar 5', 33', 90+2'; Prakash 37', 63'	Report		Stadium: Murdoch Park; Referee: Sachin Sharma

25 April 2026	Waikato Unicol (5)	2–1	Otahuhu United (6)	Hillcrest
14:00	Taylor 23', 66'	Report	Azim 90+1'	Stadium: Waikato University; Referee: Robert Orchard

25 April 2026	Otorohanga (5)	0–6	South Auckland Rangers (5)	Ōtorohanga
14:30		Report	Naicker 22'; Khan 24'; Prasad 29', 36'; Navaba 76'; Pratap 90+9'	Stadium: Otorohanga Domain; Referee: Carl Watkins

25 April 2026	Mangere United (5)	2–3	University of Auckland (SUN)	Māngere East
15:00		Report		Stadium: Centre Park; Referee: Bradley Hallford

25 April 2026	AFC Bohemian Celtic (SUN)	2–0	Te Puke United (5)	Mount Wellington
16:00		Report		Stadium: Bill McKinlay Park; Referee: Brett Macdonald

26 April 2026	Thai Warriors (SUN)	w/o	Mangawhai (5)	Avondale
13:00		Report		Stadium: Eastdale Reserve

26 April 2026	Eden United (SUN)	0–4	Waiheke United (5)	Ellerslie
14:30		Report	Mena 20'; Vanina 58'; O'Hara 62' (o.g.); Herrera 90+3'	Stadium: Michaels Ave Reserve; Referee: Elliot Winstanley

27 April 2026	Zamantix Rovers Deuce (SUN)	2–3	Internationale (SUN)	Ellerslie
14:00		Report		Stadium: Michaels Ave Reserve; Referee: Andrew Bond

Central Region

27 April 2026	Greytown (4)	6–2	Victoria University of Wellington (5)	Greytown
14:00	Tod-Smith 28', 64'; Maclennan 39', 42'; Mason-Smith 50'; Mitchell 90+2'	Report	Skinner 36'; Wilkinson 59'	Stadium: Soldiers Memorial Park; Referee: Karl Barry

27 April 2026	Naenae (6)	0–7	Wellington Marist (4)	Naenae
14:00		Report	Whiteside 56'; Bickers 57'; Wilson 70', 79'; Woodley 82', 90+1'; Middleton 83'	Stadium: Naenae Park; Referee: Russell Underwood

27 April 2026	Carterton (9)	0–2	Lower Hutt City (3)	Carterton
14:30		Report	Renwicks 1'; McAuley 66'	Stadium: Howard Booth Park; Referee: Shayne Reid

27 April 2026	Wellington United (5)	0–5	North Wellington (3)	Newtown
17:00		Report	Moore 32'; Luddon-Muir 35' (o.g.); Tuck 39', 42'; Holden 45+2'	Stadium: Newtown Park; Referee: Jan Chmielewski

Southern Region

25 April 2026	Halswell United (3)	3–0	University of Canterbury (3)	Halswell
14:00	Burtenshaw 44'; Ede 70'; Allatt 84'	Report		Stadium: Halswell Domain; Referee: Simon Roydhouse

25 April 2026	St Albans Shirley (5)	2–1	Mid Canterbury United (5)	Edgeware
14:00	Legge 36'; Beresford 88'	Report	Chute 66'	Stadium: St Albans Park; Referee: Regan Preston

25 April 2026	Tahuna (3)	3–0	Richmond Athletic (3)	Tāhunanui
14:00	Williamson 9'; Hampton 28'; Denbigh 31'	Report		Stadium: Tahunanui; Referee: Mark Papps

25 April 2026	Golden Bay (3)	0–5	Rangers AFC (3)	Tākaka
14:00		Report	Clamp 27'; Zapata-Zuniga 45+3'; Connor-Mcclean 55'; Crafts 67', 83'	Stadium: Takaka Recreational Gound; Referee: Ian Marshall

25 April 2026	FC Nelson (3)	2–0 (a.e.t.)	Motueka (5)	The Wood
14:30	Lian 102'; Thompson 116'	Report		Stadium: Guppy Park; Referee: Iain MacFadyen

27 April 2026	FC Twenty 11 (4)	4–0	Parklands United (4)	Ilam
13:00	Ahmadi 10', 55'; Coster 90+2'; Morgan 90+5'	Report		Stadium: Upper Riccarton Domain; Referee: Ryan Mahalm

=== Round 1 ===
Number of teams per tier still in competition
Tier 1+2	Tier 3	Tier 4	Tier 5, 6, 9	Sunday League	Total
31 / 31	35 / 38	21 / 22	11 / 24	3 / 6	101 / 121

Northern Region

9 May 2026	Hamilton Wanderers (3)	3–0	Mt Albert-Ponsonby (3)	Hamilton
13:00	Lindsey 57'; Thompson 71' (pen.); Hamblin 90+2'			Stadium: Porritt Stadium; Referee: Phillip Rogers

9 May 2026	Papamoa FC (4)	8–0	Franklin United (5)	Tauranga
14:00	Silcock 7'; Hastie 19', 70'; Cooper 41'; Kessell 75'; Axton 83'; Pidgeon 87'; Murphy 90+3'			Stadium: Gordon Spratt Reserve; Referee: Kavish Chand

9 May 2026	Ōtūmoetai (4)	1–3 (a.e.t.)	Waiheke United (5)	Tauranga
14:00	Smith 40'		Vanina 24'; Klarich 115'; Sepulveda Carvajal 119'	Stadium: Fergusson Park; Referee: Carl Watkins

9 May 2026	Matamata Swifts (4)	1–2	Northern United (4)	Matamata
14:00	Abbott 58'		Dixon 17'; Nazari 60'	Stadium: Matamata Domain; Referee: Stuart Blake

9 May 2026	Taupo (3)	2–3	Cambridge (3)	Taupo
14:00	O'Donoghue 45+1'; Nahna 47' (o.g.)		Clarkin 28'; Connor 63'; Rogers 74'	Stadium: Crown Park; Referee: Riley Greenbury

9 May 2026	Papatoetoe (5)	0–1	Albany United (4)	Papatoetoe
14:00			Blackwood 81'	Stadium: Murdoch Park; Referee: Roger Williams

9 May 2026	West Auckland (5)	0–4	Uni-Mount Bohemian (6)	Kelston
14:00			Berghaus 48'; Phillips 69' (o.g.); Wearing 90+2'; Berghaus 90+4'	Stadium: Onewherowhero / Brains Park; Referee: Ron van Zuilen

9 May 2026	Beachlands Maraetai (4)	7–1	Whakatane Town (5)	Beachlands
14:00	McCoskrie 18', 45', 54', 58' (pen.); Szopa 62'; Edekar 73'; Hutchinson 90+5'		McCracken 45+2'	Stadium: Te Puru Park; Referee: Marcus Turner

9 May 2026	Ellerslie (3)	1–2	Northern Rovers (3)	Ellerslie
14:00	Manko 37'		Dougherty 14'; Armstrong 44'	Stadium: Michaels Ave Reserve; Referee: Nick Kang

9 May 2026	Oratia United (5)	2–4	Metro FC (4)	Oratia
14:00	Jacobson 17'; Brown 45'		Sadika 13'; Parsons 36'; Hearn 71', 84'	Stadium: Parrs Park; Referee: Alec Couchman

9 May 2026	Bucklands Beach (4)	1–2	Northland (4)	Bucklands Beach
14:00	Waterland 36'		Mohammadi 4', 55'	Stadium: Rogers Park; Referee: Pranil Gordhan

9 May 2026	Te Atatu (4)	1–2	Central United (4)	Te Atatū Peninsula
14:00	Bowen 84'		Fusha 11'; Pank 86'	Stadium: Te Atatū Peninsula Park; Referee: Clint van Eyssen

9 May 2026	Manurewa (3)	0–0 (a.e.t.) (3–4 p)	Takapuna (3)	Manurewa
14:00				Stadium: Manurewa War Memorial Park; Referee: Othmane Jebli
	Penalties
	Blake (penalty scored); Lahtinen-Kalsi (penalty missed); Robinson (penalty scored); Foo (penalty missed); Sawasaka (penalty scored)		(penalty scored) Cromb; (penalty scored) Otsubo; (penalty missed) Rodriguez; (penalty scored) Robb; (penalty scored) Khalil

9 May 2026	Mangawhai (5)	0–6	Onehunga Māngere United (3)	Mangawhai
14:00			O'Connell 45+3'; McIntyre 52'; Shipman 68', 82'; Tweed 86'; Mori 88'	Stadium: Mangawhai Domain; Referee: Ben McInnes

9 May 2026	Hibiscus Coast (3)	3–2	Waitemata (4)	Whangaparāoa
14:00	Stevenson 9'; Felstead 45+3', 54'		Silver 26'; Turner 87'	Stadium: Stanmore Bay Park; Referee: Aaron Day

9 May 2026	West Coast Rangers (3)	2–0	North Shore United (3)	Whenuapai
15:00	O'Malley 4'; Short 43'			Stadium: Fred Taylor Park; Referee: James Logan

10 May 2026	West Hamilton United (4)	0–3	South Auckland Rangers (5)	Hamilton
14:00			Moraica 76'; Aguila Ochoa 87', 90'	Stadium: Mahoe Park; Referee: Robert Orchard

10 May 2026	Internationale FC (SUN)	1–6	Ngaruawahia United (4)	Western Springs
14:00	Harris 85'		Edwards 5', 12'; Best 26'; Briggs 45'; Wales 53'; Birch 70'	Stadium: Seddon Fields; Referee: Shujaat Azizullah

10 May 2026	AFC Bohemian Celtic (SUN)	0–3	Claudelands Rovers (4)	Ellerslie
14:30			Gower-Rudman 6', 86'; King-McRae 45+2'	Stadium: Michaels Ave Reserve; Referee: Michael Given

17 May 2026	University of Auckland FC (SUN)	7–0	Waikato Unicol (5)	New Lynn
14:00				Stadium: Ken Maunder Park; Referee: Kester Rebello

Central Region

9 May 2026	Seatoun (3)	2–1	Wainuiomata (3)	Seatoun
14:00	Milton 7'; Pressnell 73'		Carey 60'	Stadium: Seatoun Park; Referee: Jan Chmielewski

9 May 2026	Wellington Marist (4)	2–6	Greytown (4)	Kilbirnie
14:00	Bickers 5'; Whiteside 90+1'		MacDonald 23', 45+2'; Tod-Smith 29', 70', 82'; Ward 31'	Stadium: Kilbirnie Park; Referee: Russell Underwood

9 May 2026	North Wellington (3)	3–4	Tawa (3)	Johnsonville
14:00	Tuck 29'; Macgregor 53'; Sharp-Judge 63'		Staunton 25', 31', 54'; Brosnahan 79'	Stadium: Alex Moore Park; Referee: Dan Shaw

9 May 2026	Lower Hutt City (3)	2–3	Stop Out (3)	Lower Hutt
14:00	Krech-Watene 58'; Ferguson 61'		Magee 4'; Webster 63', 67'	Stadium: Fraser Park; Referee: Andrew Phillips

9 May 2026	Palmerston North United (3)	1–3	Havelock North Wanderers (4)	Palmerston North
14:00	Jones 76'		Parker 15', 20', 36'	Stadium: Memorial Park; Referee: Ali Muhammad

9 May 2026	Taradale (3)	2–3	Whanganui Athletic (4)	Taradale
14:00	MacKirdy 23'; Green 51'		Hall 56' (o.g.); Dijkgraaf 67'; Petersen 71'	Stadium: Taradale Park; Referee: Ryan Todd

Southern Region

8 May 2026	Ferrymead Bays (1)	2–1	Western AFC (3)	Ferrymead
19:15	Butler 36', 59'		Unknown (o.g.) 11'	Stadium: Ferrymead Park; Referee: Ben O'Connell

9 May 2026	Mosgiel (3)	2–0	Northern Hearts (3)	Mosgiel
12:00	Koppert 15'; Stephens 81'			Stadium: Memorial Park; Referee: Caleb Marsh

9 May 2026	FC Twenty 11 (4)	0–12	Cashmere Technical (1)	Upper Riccarton
14:00				Stadium: Upper Riccarton Domain; Referee: Aaron Nottage

9 May 2026	Halswell United (3)	3–1	Burwood (3)	Halswell
14:00	Ede 53'; Turner 84'		Austen 6'	Stadium: Halswell Domain; Referee: Caleb Downes

9 May 2026	Nomads United (2)	3–1 (a.e.t.)	Coastal Spirit (2)	Casebrook
14:00	Burge 80', 119'; Turner 105'		Uribe Sepulveda 89'	Stadium: Tulett Park; Referee: Michael Killick

9 May 2026	St Albans Shirley (5)	1–2	Waimakariri United (3)	St Albans
14:00	Nightingale-McMahon 90+1'		Suter 10'; Vialoux 84'	Stadium: St Albans Park; Referee: Charles Loughnan

9 May 2026	Roslyn Wakari (3)	1–2	Otago University AFC (3)	Roslyn
14:00	Williams-Davies 26'		Fairbairn 54'; Setters 56'	Stadium: Ellis Park; Referee: Grace Teah

9 May 2026	Timaru United (4)	1–0	Green Island (3)	Timaru
14:00	Le Bherz 90+2'			Stadium: Caledonian Ground; Referee: Hayden Wederell

9 May 2026	FC Nelson (3)	4–1	Tahuna (3)	The Wood
14:30	Fernandez Ortiz 5'; Hampton 47' (o.g.); Thompson 78'; Lian 90'		Jepson 90+2'	Stadium: Guppy Park; Referee: Maurice Llewellin

9 May 2026	Selwyn United (2)	0–4	Christchurch United (2)	Rolleston
15:00			Peterson 29'; Masiyakurima 44'; Duncan 48'; Grosso 62'	Stadium: Foster Park; Referee: Ralph Clink

10 May 2026	Nelson Suburbs (2)	6–1	Rangers AFC (3)	Nelson
14:30	Polak 25'; Reynolds 39'; Vickers 57'; Whewell 58'; Anderson 63'; Pan 89'		Mortimer 20'	Stadium: Saxton Fields; Referee: Ian Marshall

=== Round 2 ===
Number of teams per tier still in competition
Tier 1+2	Tier 3	Tier 4	Tier 5, 6, 9	Sunday League	Total
29 / 31	18 / 38	13 / 22	3 / 24	1 / 6	64 / 121

Northern Region

30 May 2026	Albany United (4)	0–2	Waiheke United (5)	Rosedale
14:00			Sepulveda Carvajal 8'; Herrera 26'	Stadium: Rosedale Park; Referee: Alec Couchman

30 May 2026	Central United (4)	1–4	West Coast Rangers (3)	Sandringham
14:00	Dida 63'		O'Malley 6'; Gallagher 58'; Zasadny 64'; Wolloner 78'	Stadium: Freyberg Field; Referee: Aaron Day

30 May 2026	Northland (4)	3–4	South Auckland Rangers (5)	Kensington
14:00	Mohammadi 16', 69'; Diamond 75'		Tuwai 1'; Moraica 22', 74', 82'	Stadium: Trigg Arena; Referee: Darren Johnston

30 May 2026	Onehunga Māngere United (3)	2–4 (a.e.t.)	Northern Rovers (3)	Māngere Bridge
14:00	Minto 3'; McCoy 90+3'		Inoue 87'; Armstrong 90', 95'; MacKenzie 103'	Stadium: Mangere Domain; Referee: Jack Henderson

30 May 2026	Metro FC (4)	4–5 (a.e.t.)	Hamilton Wanderers (3)	Mount Albert
14:00	Yoon 16'; Duff 44'; Haj Mohamed 75'; Hearn 78'		Hamblin 7', 28', 90+1'; Lindsey 65'; Davis-Havill 91'	Stadium: Phyllis Street Reserve; Referee: Reza Al Rabea

30 May 2026	Beachlands Maraetai (4)	0–3	Hibiscus Coast (3)	Beachlands
14:00			Stevenson 24'; Hackenberg 55'; Brown 83'	Stadium: Te Puru Park; Referee: James Logan

31 May 2026	University of Auckland FC (SUN)	2–0	Uni-Mount Bohemian (6)	New Lynn
14:00				Stadium: Ken Maunder Park; Referee: Clint van Eyssen

1 June 2026	Northern United (4)	1–8	Auckland United (1)	Rototuna North
14:00	Dixon 15'		Nunez 7'; Manuel 44', 45+1'; Saric 54'; Beer 58'; Campbell 61', 64'	Stadium: Korikori Park; Referee: Sarah Jones

1 June 2026	Manukau United (2)	4–5 (a.e.t.)	Cambridge (3)	Māngere East
14:00	Nadir 33', 38'; Sumner 80'; Visser 113'		Clarkin 41', 52', 94'; Connor 61', 120+1'	Stadium: Walter Massey Park; Referee: Shawn Liu

1 June 2026	Fencibles United (2)	6–1	Papamoa (4)	Pakuranga Heights
14:00	Holder 2', 58', 81'; Van der Salm 11' (o.g.); Rooney 63'; Lai-Sai 67'		Cooper 39'	Stadium: Riverhills Park; Referee: Ron van Zuilen

1 June 2026	Eastern Suburbs (1)	0–2 (a.e.t.)	Melville United (2)	Kohimarama
14:00			Bell 113'; Boss 116'	Stadium: Madills Farm; Referee: Veer Singh

1 June 2026	East Coast Bays (2)	4–2	Auckland FC Reserves (1)	Oteha
14:00	Zabarauskas 18', 42'; Brown 25'; Essome Penda 78'		Elder 49', 64'	Stadium: Bay City Park; Referee: Ashley Wilson

1 June 2026	Claudelands Rovers (4)	0–6	Auckland City (1)	Hamilton East
14:00			Richards 19', 55'; Singh 20'; Bell 23'; Angus Kilkolly 71', 83'	Stadium: Galloway Park; Referee: Kavish Chand

1 June 2026	Ngaruawahia United (4)	2–1 (a.e.t.)	Tauranga City (2)	Ngāruawāhia
14:00	Rogerson 104'; Latham 114'		Knight 109'	Stadium: Centennial Park; Referee: Carl Watkins

1 June 2026	Takapuna (3)	3–1 (a.e.t.)	Western Springs (2)	Takapuna
14:00	Allan 15'; Robb 92'; Derringer 120+3'		Cooper 45+2'	Stadium: Taharoto Park; Referee: Hayden Tutbury

1 June 2026	Bay Olympic (2)	2–6	Birkenhead United (1)	New Lynn
14:00	Lovelock 19'; Vasquez Martinez 84'		Bidwell 25'; Dymond 32'; Taylor 45'; Botica 65'; Eng 87', 90+4' (o.g.)	Stadium: Olympic Park; Referee: Kirk Davis

Central Region

30 May 2026	Havelock North Wanderers (4)	1–2	Western Suburbs (2)	Havelock North
14:00	Mack 89'		Mackenzie 47'; Wigg 78'	Stadium: Guthrie Park; Referee: Ryan Todd

30 May 2026	Seatoun (3)	3–3 (a.e.t.) (6–5 p)	Upper Hutt City (2)	Seatoun
14:00				Stadium: Seatoun Park; Referee: Jordan Boyd

30 May 2026	Tawa (3)	1–4	Stop Out (3)	Tawa
14:00				Stadium: Redwood Park; Referee: Chris Bennett

30 May 2026	Whanganui Athletic (4)	0–2	Palmerston North Marist (3)	Whanganui
14:00			Minshull 3', 6'	Stadium: Wembley Park; Referee: Ali Muhammad

30 May 2026	Wellington Olympic (1)	1–2	Miramar Rangers (1)	Island Bay
14:00	Mata 90+4'		Gaul 71'; Lamb 80'	Stadium: Wakefield Park; Referee: Cory Mills

30 May 2026	Petone (2)	2–0	Greytown (4)	Petone
14:00	Tokhirov 62'; Pickering 90+2'			Stadium: Memorial Park; Referee: Andrew Phillips

1 June 2026	Napier City Rovers (1)	7–0	Waterside Karori (2)	Napier
14:00	Stanley 3', 22', 30', 90'; Richardson 35' (o.g.); Barclay 38'; Schofield 65'			Stadium: Bluewater Stadium; Referee: Jordan Williams

3 June 2026	Wellington Phoenix Reserves (1)	2–3 (a.e.t.)	Island Bay United (2)	Petone
19:30	Hale 29'; Mitchell 39' (pen.)		Nesibu 15'; Dellow 23'; O'Farrell 105+1'	Stadium: Memorial Park; Referee: Dom Barry

Southern Region

29 May 2026	Christchurch United (2)	0–2 (a.e.t.)	Nomads United (2)	Russley
19:00			Holland 108'; Johnson 112'	Stadium: United Sports Centre; Referee: Caleb Downes

29 May 2026	Ferrymead Bays (1)	7–1	Halswell United (3)	Ferrymead
19:15	Cameron 30'; Murphy 33', 36'; Thoms 41', 46'; Killick 69'; Marson 90+4'		Langley 16'	Stadium: Ferrymead Park; Referee: Andrey Guimaraes

30 May 2026	Mosgiel (3)	5–0	Timaru United (4)	Mosgiel
14:00	West 1', 59'; Stephens 15'; Adye 66'; Le Bherz 90+2' (o.g.)			Stadium: Memorial Park; Referee: Matthew Bray

30 May 2026	Dunedin City Royals (2)	5–2	Queens Park (3)	Tahuna
14:00	Davidson 19'; Fielding 25'; Neil 31', 90+2'; Varrica 90'		Orobio 10'; Schmidt de Camargo 42'	Stadium: Tahuna Park; Referee: Lindsey Robinson

30 May 2026	Northern (2)	3–0	Wānaka (2)	Dunedin
14:00	Orchiston 15'; Dale; Kotkamp 90+2'			Stadium: Caledonian Ground; Referee: Wayne van Gorp

30 May 2026	Waimakariri United (3)	0–7	Cashmere Technical (1)	Kaiapoi
14:00			Matthysen 7', 35'; Hibbert 16'; Peacocke 32'; Belingher 33', 70', 88'	Stadium: Kendall Park; Referee: Michael Killick

30 May 2026	Nelson Suburbs (2)	4–0	FC Nelson (3)	Nelson
14:30	Polak 4', 26'; Pan 48'; Mupemhena 78'			Stadium: Saxton Fields; Referee: Iain MacFadyen

30 May 2026	Old Boys (3)	3–5 (a.e.t.)	Otago University (3)	Invercargill
15:00	Tull 45', 78', 107'		Pierce 16'; Fairbairn 79', 100'; Kidd 94', 103'	Stadium: ILT Football Turf; Referee: Craig Campbell

=== Round 3 ===
Matches were played over the weekend of 12–14 June. This round contained one team from the Auckland Sunday Football Association (non-ranked); University of Auckland, which is the lowest-ranked team left in the competition.

Number of teams per tier still in competition
Tier 1+2	Tier 3	Tier 4	Tier 5, 6, 9	Sunday League	Total
17 / 31	11 / 38	1 / 22	2 / 24	1 / 6	32 / 121

Northern Region

13 June 2026	Takapuna (3)	3–1	Waiheke United (5)	Takapuna
14:00	Khalil 41'; Robb 51' (pen.); Cromb 81'		Villanueva 30'	Stadium: Taharoto Park; Referee: Reza Al Rabea

13 June 2026	South Auckland Rangers (5)	3–0	University of Auckland (SUN)	Flat Bush
14:00				Stadium: Rongomai Reserve; Referee: Boaz Peach

13 June 2026	Auckland United (1)	2–1	Hamilton Wanderers (3)	Mount Roskill
14:00	Beer 21'; Wallace 32'		Lindsey 52'	Stadium: Keith Hay Park; Referee: Shawn Liu

13 June 2026	Cambridge (3)	3–0	Northern Rovers (3)	Cambridge
14:00	Connor 28'; Portegys 56'; Clarkin 72'			Stadium: John Kerkhof Park; Referee: Riley Greenbury

13 June 2026	Auckland City (1)	2–1	East Coast Bays (2)	Sandringham
14:00	Rostron 24'; Mitchell 63'		Essome Penda 34'	Stadium: Kiwitea Street; Referee: Kirk Davis

13 June 2026	Melville United (2)	3–0	Ngaruawahia United (4)	Hamilton Lake
14:00	Alamshah 9'; Franke 20'; Boss 25'			Stadium: Gower Park

13 June 2026	West Coast Rangers (3)	3–3 (a.e.t.) (3–4 p)	Hibiscus Coast (3)	Whenuapai
15:00				Stadium: Fred Taylor Park; Referee: Clint van Eyssen

13 June 2026	Birkenhead United (1)	1–3	Fencibles United (2)	Beach Haven
17:00	Patterson 27'		Laing-McConnell 33', 56'; Lopez Munoz 87'	Stadium: Shepherds Park; Referee: Ashley Wilson

Central Region

13 June 2026	Seatoun (3)	1–2	Petone (2)	Seatoun
14:00	Sneddon 10'		Davies 80'; Coleman 86'	Stadium: Seatoun Park; Referee: Ralph Clink

13 June 2026	Palmerston North Marist (3)	0–2	Napier City Rovers (1)	Palmerston North Central
14:00			Stanley 58'; Cooke 90+3'	Stadium: Arena Manawatu Turf; Referee: Jono Galuszka

13 June 2026	Miramar Rangers (1)	2–0	Western Suburbs (2)	Miramar
14:00	Bobadilla 51'; Cameron 53'			Stadium: David Farrington Park; Referee: Aaron Clarke

13 June 2026	Island Bay United (2)	3–2	Stop Out (3)	Island Bay
15:45	Mitchener 33'; Ball 45+1', 63'		Magee 76'; Webster 80'	Stadium: Wakefield Park; Referee: Conor Healy

Southern Region

12 June 2026	Ferrymead Bays (1)	3–4	Cashmere Technical (1)	Ferrymead
19:15	Killick 13'; Stanton 35'; Butler 77' (pen.)		Smith 10' (o.g.); Edwards 34'; Hibbert 39'; Matthysen 83'	Stadium: Ferrymead Park; Referee: Caleb Downes

13 June 2026	Dunedin City Royals (2)	5–1	Mosgiel (3)	Tahuna
14:00	Varrica 9'; Hodson 45+1', 63'; Swain 45+5'; Neil 63'		Thompson 84'	Stadium: Tāhuna Park; Referee: Nikolay Shevlyakov

13 June 2026	Northern (2)	2–1	Otago University (3)	Dunedin North
14:00	Orchiston 9'; Gorman 28'		Pierce 88'	Stadium: Caledonian Ground; Referee: Aaron Collins

14 June 2026	Nomads United (2)	0–2	Nelson Suburbs (2)	Casebrook
11:00			Whewell 19'; Reynolds 28'	Stadium: Tulett Park; Referee: Michael Killick

=== Round 4 ===
On 17 June 2026, the fourth round was drawn at Auckland FC's offices at North Harbour Stadium. Auckland FC goalkeeper Oli Sail and New Zealand Football's Events Manager Stuart Dwight conducted the draw. The matches took place on 4 July.

Number of teams per tier still in competition
Tier 1+2	Tier 3	Tier 4	Tier 5, 6, 9	Sunday League	Total
12 / 31	3 / 38	0 / 22	1 / 24	0 / 6	16 / 121

Northern Region

4 July 2026	Auckland United (1)	3–1 (a.e.t.)	Cambridge (3)	Mount Roskill
14:00	Fay 79'; Wallace 92', 103'	Report	Clarkin 50'	Stadium: Keith Hay Park; Referee: Kirk Davis

4 July 2026	Auckland City (1)	3–0	Takapuna (3)	Sandringham
14:00	Manickum 55'; de Vries 57'; Kilkolly 89' (pen.)	Report		Stadium: Kiwitea Street; Referee: Ashley Wilson

4 July 2026	Melville United (2)	0–1	Hibiscus Coast (3)	Melville
15:00		Report	Browne 80'	Stadium: Gower Park

4 July 2026	Fencibles United (2)	3–0	South Auckland Rangers (5)	Pakuranga Heights
18:00	Laing-McConnell 7'; Morris 42'; Lai-Sai 47'	Report		Stadium: Riverhills Park; Referee: Stephen Merriman

Central Region

4 July 2026	Petone (2)	0–4	Napier City Rovers (1)	Petone
14:00		Report	Stanley 14'; Hurd 49'; Barclay 55'; Stanley 89'	Stadium: Petone Memorial Park; Referee: Jordan Boyd

4 July 2026	Island Bay United (2)	1–3	Miramar Rangers (1)	Island Bay
15:45	Villa 54'	Report	Bueno 13'; Hewson 50'; Harris 65'	Stadium: Wakefield Park; Referee: Cory Mills

Southern Region

4 July 2026	Nelson Suburbs (2)	5–0	Northern (2)	Nelson
14:00	Reynolds 7' (pen.), 21'; Lennon Whewell 63'; Myers 65'; Anderson 89'	Report		Stadium: Saxton Fields; Referee: Craig Smart

4 July 2026	Dunedin City Royals (2)	0–9	Cashmere Technical (1)	Tahuna
15:00		Report	Edwards 6', 34', 40'; Coughlan 11' (pen.); Hibbert 52'; Kane 65'; Belingher 76'; Gallaway 80', 90+3'	Stadium: Tahuna Park; Referee: John De Bono

=== Quarter-finals ===
This round contained one team from tier 3; Hibiscus Coast, which was the lowest-ranked team left in the competition.

Number of teams per tier still in competition
Tier 1+2	Tier 3	Tier 4	Tier 5, 6, 9	Sunday League	Total
7 / 31	1 / 38	0 / 22	0 / 24	0 / 6	8 / 121

25 July 2026	Fencibles United (2)	3–2	Auckland City (1)	Pakuranga Heights
18:00	Wessels 29'; Rangihuna-Stanton 45'; Kawachi 88'	Report	Lobo 67'; Manickum 70'	Stadium: Riverhills Park; Referee: Cory Mills

26 July 2026	Cashmere Technical (1)	2–1	Miramar Rangers (1)	Woolston
12:30	Edwards 42'; Coughlan 54' (pen.)	Report	Harris 72'	Stadium: Garrick Memorial Park; Referee: Luke Gardner

26 July 2026	Hibiscus Coast (3)	2–5	Napier City Rovers (1)	Stanmore Bay
13:00	Hackenberg 4'; Kerr 30'	Report	Makowem 6'; Fenton 12'; Willox 17'; Hurd 40'; Hoyle 73'	Stadium: Stanmore Bay Park; Referee: Ben O'Connell

26 July 2026	Nelson Suburbs (2)	2–1	Auckland United (1)	Stoke
13:30	Myers 52' (pen.); Reynolds 85'	Report	Wallace 11'	Stadium: Saxton Fields; Referee: Chris Bennett

=== Semi-finals ===
The draw took place on 28 July 2026.

Number of teams per tier still in competition
Tier 1+2	Tier 3	Tier 4	Tier 5, 6, 9	Sunday League	Total
4 / 31	0 / 38	0 / 22	0 / 24	0 / 6	4 / 121

15 August 2026	Fencibles United (2)	3–0	Nelson Suburbs (2)	Pakuranga Heights
18:00	Nicol 1'; Laing-McConnell 5', 90+5'	Report		Stadium: Riverhills Park; Referee: Cory Mills

16 August 2026	Cashmere Technical (1)	2–1	Napier City Rovers (1)	Woolston
12:00	Coughlan 15'; Matthysen 48'	Report	Cooke 9'	Stadium: Garrick Memorial Park; Referee: Campbell-Kirk Kawana-Waugh

=== Final ===
Fencibles United of Auckland and Cashmere Technical of Christchurch qualified for the 2026 final. They qualified to the final for their first and eleventh times, respectively. On 17 August, New Zealand Football confirmed the venue for the 2026 Chatham Cup final as well as the Kate Sheppard Cup final as being at One New Zealand Stadium, Christchurch.

5 September 2026
16:00

Cashmere Technical	1–2	Fencibles United
Murphy 62'	Report	Muñoz 33'; Nicol 80'

One New Zealand Stadium, Christchurch
Attendance: 11,267
Referee: Anna-Marie Keighley

== Notes ==
The tiers that teams are in (as indicated in brackets next to their name) are based on the New Zealand football league system for the 2026 season. As some teams can qualify and play in more than one league (and tier) per season, the highest tier that they took part in is the one noted next to their name.
