= 2021 Chatham Cup =

Tournament details
- Country: New Zealand
- Dates: 24 April 2021 – 6 March 2022
- Teams: 126

Final positions
- Champions: Cashmere Technical (4th title)
- Runners-up: Miramar Rangers

Tournament statistics
- Matches played: 124
- Goals scored: 567 (4.57 per match)

The 2021 Chatham Cup is New Zealand's 93rd annual knockout football competition. It had a preliminary round and four rounds proper before quarter-finals, semi-finals, and a final.

== 2020 Chatham Cup ==
The 2020 Chatham Cup was not contested, owing to the COVID-19 pandemic.

== Results ==
=== Preliminary round ===
Matches were played over the Anzac weekend of 23–26 April. This round contained three teams from the Auckland Sunday football leagues, University of Auckland FC, HNK Auckland, and AFC Bohemian Celtic, the lowest ranked teams left in the competition. A full list of results are as follows:

Northern Region

24 April 2021	Te Atatu AFC (5)	3–1	University of Auckland FC (SUN)	Te Atatū Peninsula Park, Te Atatū Peninsula
14:00	Perrin 62'; Turner 45' (o.g.); Peak 57' (o.g.)	Report		Referee: Derek Anderson

25 April 2021	Puhoi (5)	3–3 (a.e.t.) (3–4 p)	FC Whangarei (8)	Puhoi Domain, Puhoi
14:00	Harland 2', 80'; Wells 83'	Report	Colmer 30'; Armiger-Kelly 32'; Porter 58'	Referee: Glen Lockrie

26 April 2021	Otahuhu United (10)	1–0	Huntly Thistle AFC (5)	Seaside Park, Ōtāhuhu
14:00	Strid 60'	Report		Referee: Carl Te Wharau

26 April 2021	Matamata Swifts (5)	2–1 (a.e.t.)	HNK Auckland (SUN)	Matamata Domain, Matamata
14:00	Avergonzado 32'; Walker 109'	Report	Yovich 69'	Referee: Robbie Maris

26 April 2021	AFC Bohemian Celtic (SUN)	0–3	West Auckland AFC (5)	Michaels Avenue Reserve, Ellerslie
14:00		Report	Hearn 60' (pen.); Riddoch 85'; Rollinson 88'	Referee: Paul Mason

26 April 2021	Lynn-Avon United (5)	1–5	West Hamilton United (5)	Ken Maunder Park, New Lynn
14:00	Hakim 82'	Report	Noorzai 32'; Adam 38'; Mire 59', 73'; Sulieman 79'	Referee: Paul Burns

26 April 2021	Kerikeri FC (7)	1–6	Ranui Swanson (5)	Baysport Waipapa, Waipapa
14:00	Obrez 3'	Report	Felipe 13'; Ngadela 39'; Morris 61'; Faure 68', 84'; Lian Zaw 82'	Referee: Michael Jones, (Great Britain)

26 April 2021	Otorohanga AFC (5)	10–0	Whakatane Town (6)	Ōtorohanga Domain, Ōtorohanga
14:00	Kelly 7'; Ball 27'; Walker 36', 87', 90'; Jones 51'; Maguire 59', 70'; O’Brien 66'; Wilkins 77'	Report		Referee: Phillip Rogers

26 April 2021	Ngongotaha AFC (5)	4–0	Taupo AFC (5)	Tamarahi Reserve, Ngongotahā
14:00	Trask 26' (pen.), 68' (pen.), 75'; Waller 28'	Report		Referee: Ben Norman

26 April 2021	Otumoetai (5)	2–0	Papamoa (5)	Fergusson Park, Matua
14:00	Sindler 11'; Carter 72'	Report		Referee: Andrew Lamberth

26 April 2021	Northern United SC (8)	1–3	Waikato Unicol AFC (5)	Korikori Park, Rototuna North
14:00	Togher 86'	Report	Henderson 49'; Seelye 68'; Wright 75' (pen.)	Referee: Andres Castro

Central Region

26 April 2021	Gisborne Thistle (3)	1–2	Havelock North Wanderers (3)	Childers Road Reserve, Gisborne
14:00	Frooms 47'	Report	Perks 4'; Groot 45'	Referee: Christopher Niven

26 April 2021	FC Western (4)	1–0	Whanganui Athletic (3)	Lynmouth Park, New Plymouth
14:00	Oliver-Rose 73'	Report		Referee: Danial Gallo

26 April 2021	Naenae Soccer Club (6)	2–3	Wellington Marist (5)	Naenae Park, Lower Hutt
14:00	Garcias 44'; Glover 58' (pen.)	Report	Greig 5'; Boyd 59'; Baillie 87'	Referee: Mark Hewitt

26 April 2021	Greytown FC (8)	0–1	Douglas Villa (6)	Greytown Memorial Park, Greytown
14:00		Report	Paine 43' (pen.)	Referee: Alexander Dahlberg

Mainland Region

23 April 2021	St Albans Shirley (4)	2–4 (a.e.t.)	Parklands United (4)	English Park, Christchurch
19:00	Gaupset 39'; Ribeiro De Abreu 71'	Report	Livingstone 63'; Stark 88', 101'; Norris 118'	Referee: Javier Ortega

23 April 2021	FC Twenty 11 (4)	4–1	Universities AFC (4)	Avonhead Park, Avonhead
19:00	Lopez 17', 81' (pen.); Clarke 59'; Bowman 90'	Report	Pride 90'	Referee: Paul Pace

24 April 2021	Mid Canterbury United (4)	2–3 (a.e.t.)	Western AFC (4)	Ashburton Domain, Ashburton
14:45	Martin 73', 120+5'	Report	Asghari 90+4', 116'; Balcazar 113'	Referee: Michael Field

26 April 2021	FC Nelson (5)	4–0	Tahuna FC (5)	Guppy Park, Nelson
14:30	Hlawnceu 50'; Morozgalski 83' (o.g.); Johnston 83' (o.g.); Pan 90'	Report		Referee: Richard Malcolm

26 April 2021	Rangers (Blenheim) (5)	6–0	Mapua Rangers Football Club (7)	A & P Park, Blenheim
14:30	Delgado 19', 37'; Mortimer 26'; Clamp 71', 82'; Masters 75'	Report		Referee: Gary Roberts

Southern Region

25 April 2021	Geraldine FC (4)	5–3 (a.e.t.)	Old Boys AFC (4)	Geraldine Oval, Geraldine
14:00	Filippini Irazun 31'; Guerra Garcia 41'; Casas 76'; Barrie 108'; Vallejo 113'	Report	Ortiz 5', 58'; Miranda 87'	Referee: Aaron Collins

26 April 2021	West End (4)	5–1	Northern Hearts AFC (4)	West End Park, Timaru
14:00	Cooper 34', 77', 84'; Affleck 65'; Duncan 90+3'	Report	Powdrell 11'	Referee: Jan-Hendrik Kuepper

26 April 2021	Thistle FC (4)	0–1	Gore Wanderers (4)	ILT Football Turf, Invercargill
14:00		Report	Calder 45+1' (o.g.)	Referee: Will Dymond

All teams listed below received byes to the first round.

Northern Region: Albany United FC, Auckland City FC, Auckland United FC, Bay Olympic FC, Beachlands Maraetai AFC, Birkenhead United AFC, Bucklands Beach AFC, Cambridge FC, Claudelands Rovers SC, East Coast Bays AFC, Eastern Suburbs AFC, Ellerslie AFC, Fencibles United AFC, Franklin United FC, Greenhithe FC, Hamilton Wanderers, Hibiscus Coast AFC, Manukau United FC, Manurewa AFC, Melville Utd AFC, Metro FC, Mt Albert-Ponsonby AFC, Ngaruawahia Utd AFC, North Shore United AFC, Northern Rovers FC, Onehunga Mangere United AFC, Oratia United FC, Papakura City FC, Papatoetoe AFC, Royal New Zealand Navy AFC, Takapuna AFC, Tauranga City AFC, Uni-Mount Bohemian AFC, Waiheke Utd AFC, Waitemata FC, West Coast Rangers FC, Western Springs AFC
Central Region: N/a

Capital Region: Brooklyn Northern Utd AFC, Island Bay United AFC, Kapiti Coast Utd, Lower Hutt City AFC, Miramar Rangers AFC, Napier City Rovers AFC, North Wellington FC, Palmerston North Marist Football Club, Petone FC, Seatoun AFC, Stokes Valley Football Club, Stop Out SC, Tawa AFC, Upper Hutt City Football, Victoria University, Waikanae AFC, Wainuiomata, Wairarapa United, Waterside Karori, Wellington Olympic AFC, Wellington United, Western Suburbs FC
Mainland Region: Burwood AFC, Cashmere Technical, Christchurch Utd, Coastal Spirit, Ferrymead Bays FC, Halswell United AFC, Nelson Suburbs FC, Nomads United AFC, Selwyn United FC, Waimakariri Utd
Southern Region: Grants Braes AFC, Green Island AFC, Mosgiel AFC, Northern AFC, Otago University AFC, Queens Park AFC, Queenstown AFC, Roslyn Wakari AFC, South City Royals FC, Thistle AFC - Timaru, Wanaka AFC

=== Round 1 ===
Round 1 matches were played between 15 and 16 May 2021. This round contained one team from level 10, Otahuhu United, the lowest ranked team left in the competition. A full list of results are as follows:

Northern Region

15 May 2021	Ngongotaha (5)	1–5	Tauranga City (3)	Stembridge Road, Ngongotahā
14:00	Simiona 28'	Report	McLeod 12'; Langton 17'; Carter 59', 85'; Silcock 82'	Referee: Paul Shakes

15 May 2021	Otorohanga (5)	0–3	Manurewa (3)	Ōtorohanga Domain, Ōtorohanga
14:00		Report	Fuentes Salinas 33', 54'; Perez 56'	Referee: Ben Norman

15 May 2021	Waikato Unicol (5)	2–1	Uni-Mount Bohemian Celtic (4)	Jansen Park, Hamilton
14:00	Henderson 4'; Imray 42'	Report	McLoughlin 47'	Referee: Robbie Maris

15 May 2021	East Coast Bays (3)	3–2	Hibiscus Coast (4)	Bay City Park, North Shore
14:00	Garcia 9', 66'; Singh 72'	Report	Stevenson 21', 48'	Referee: Ashley Wilson

15 May 2021	Navy (8)	2–4	FC Whangarei (8)	Naval Sports Complex, Auckland
14:00	Wierenga 25', 34'	Report	Forbes 7'; Porter 14', 55'; Colmer 65'	Referee: Martin Huang

15 May 2021	West Hamilton United (5)	2–0	Matamata Swifts (5)	Weka Street, Hamilton
14:00	Mire 41'; Pidoke 62'	Report		Referee: Andres Castro

15 May 2021	Greenhithe Catimba (4)	0–4	Ellerslie (3)	Rosedale Park, North Shore
14:00		Report	Morrow 39'; Corbett 41', 79'; Larce-Paulsen 70'	Referee: Tanvir Bhamij

15 May 2021	Otahuhu United (10)	0–3	Cambridge (4)	Seaside Park, Auckland
14:00		Report	Hurd 13'; O'Leary 32', 48'	Referee: James Ashford

15 May 2021	Onehunga Mangere United (4)	5–3 (a.e.t.)	Takapuna (3)	Māngere Domain, Māngere
14:00	Rastagar 33', 116'; Manko 62', 111', 118'	Report	Lewis 13' (o.g.); Willcox 25'; Jugum-Sullivan 110'	Referee: Nicholas Kang

15 May 2021	West Auckland Kiwi True Blues (5)	3–0	Papatoetoe (4)	Brains Park, Auckland
14:00	Hearn 64' (pen.); Bond 75'; Hercus 81'	Report		Referee: Mark Fleming

15 May 2021	Fencibles United (4)	2–4	Claudelands Rovers (4)	Riverhills Domain, Auckland
14:00	Priestley 63'; Fa'apoi 70'	Report	Webster 14'; Clark 22', 47'; Edwards 41'	Referee: Shawn Liu

15 May 2021	Waiheke United (3)	3–2	Oratia United (4)	Onetangi Sports Park, Waiheke Island
14:00	Amad 7' (pen.); Canay 34', 65'	Report	Cody 58'; Cain 73'	Referee: Riley Greenbury

15 May 2021	Ranui Swanson (5)	2–0	Bucklands Beach (3)	Starling Park, West Auckland
14:00	Ngadela 42'; Lian Zaw 61'	Report		Referee: Kristian Klette

15 May 2021	Papakura City (5)	3–1	Otumoetai (5)	McLennan Park, Auckland
14:00	Bell 30' (o.g.); Harker 77', 88'	Report	Morling 22' (o.g.)	Referee: Karl Barry

15 May 2021	Ngaruawahia United (5)	2–2 (a.e.t.) (7–6 p)	Beachlands Maraetai (4)	Centennial Park, Ngaruawahia
14:30		Report		Referee: Phillip Rogers

15 May 2021	Franklin United (4)	3–1	Te Atatu (5)	Drury Sportsgrounds, Drury
17:00	Ashby-Peckham 8'; Sage 59'; Fa’arodo 85'	Report	Bradley 75'	Referee: Clint Van Eyssen

Central / Capital Region

15 May 2021	FC Western (4)	0–3	Napier City Rovers (2)	Lynmouth Park, New Plymouth
12:00		Report	Stevenson 36', 70', 73'	Referee: Gareth Sheehan

15 May 2021	Havelock North Wanderers (3)	3–2	Palmerston North Marist (3)	Guthrie Park, Havelock North
12:45	Perks 13'; Christensen 40', 55'	Report	Rumere 76'; Carrick 86'	Referee: Jason Marshall

15 May 2021	Kapiti Coast United (4)	4–0	Waikanae (5)	Weka Park, Kāpiti
14:00	Leitch 15'; Williams 45+2'; Jones 83'; Lawrie 85'	Report		Referee: Isaac Trevis

15 May 2021	Tawa (3)	10–1	Douglas Villa (6)	Redwood Park, Wellington
14:00	Martin 29' (pen.), 33' (pen.), 80' (pen.); La 36'; McCutcheon 43', 75', 88'; Willis-Benton 67'; Kerr 86'; Rose 90'	Report	Sexton 77'	Referee: Chris Bennett

15 May 2021	North Wellington (2)	2–1	Seatoun (4)	Alex Moore Park, Wellington
14:00	Henderson 63'; Delaney 74'	Report	Townsend 90+2'	Referee: David Beattie

15 May 2021	Wellington United (3)	5–0	Stokes Valley (4)	Newtown Park, Wellington
14:00	Skinner 59', 63'; Heredia 66'; Junca 72'; Villa 83'	Report		Referee: Simon Morris

15 May 2021	Brooklyn Northern United (4)	0–5	Waterside Karori (2)	Wakefield Park, Wellington
14:30		Report	Cordwell 18', 60', 84'; Luke-Miny 75'; Fautley 89'	Referee: Dom Barry

15 May 2021	Island Bay United (3)	4–1	Petone (2)	Wakefield Park, Wellington
14:30	O'Hara 31', 54'; Mitchener 34'; Cahill-Fleury 45+2'	Report	Cahill-Fleury 46' (o.g.)	Referee: Peter MacDonald

15 May 2021	Victoria University (4)	1–3	Upper Hutt City (3)	Boyd Wilson Turf, Wellington
15:00	Gilbert 6'	Report	J. Fong 2'; Harper 22'; Hinton 81'	Referee: Sean Reilly

16 May 2021	Wellington Marist (5)	1-2	Stop Out (3)	Kilbirnie Park, Wellington
14:00	Fenton 88' (pen.)	Report	Gillespie 2'; Sutcliffe 84' (pen.)	Referee: Nigel Piper

Mainland Region

15 May 2021	Parklands United (4)	0–8	Cashmere Technical (1)	Parklands Reserve, Christchurch
14:00		Report	Coughlan 4', 25', 29', 56', 83', 90'; Richards 73'; Taguchi 77'	Referee: Javier Ortega

15 May 2021	Waimakariri United (4)	0–3	Coastal Spirit (2)	Kendall Park, Kaiapoi
14:00		Report	Butler 57'; Rabuka 72'; Nicol 84'	Referee: Hayden McCabe

15 May 2021	Halswell United (3)	2–3	Selwyn United (1)	Halswell Domain, Christchurch
14:00	Rean 22'; Bellamy 28'	Report	Sims 41'; Caughey 63'; Ede 82'	Referee: Paul Pace

15 May 2021	Western (4)	0–1 (a.e.t.)	Burwood (4)	Walter Park, Christchurch
14:00		Report	Toye 103'	Referee: Ralph Clink

15 May 2021	Ferrymead Bays (3)	3–1	Nomads United (3)	Ferrymead Park, Christchurch
14:30	Murphy 24'; Oakman 27' (o.g.); Deehan 69' (pen.)	Report	Hassanian 16'	Referee: Ben O’Connell

15 May 2021	FC Twenty 11 (4)	0–2	Christchurch United (2)	Avonhead Park, Christchurch
14:45		Report	McClay 75'; Colloty 90+2'	Referee: Regan Preston

16 May 2021	FC Nelson (5)	1-2 (a.e.t.)	Rangers (Blenheim) (5)	Guppy Park, Nelson
14:00	Johnston 24'	Report	Masters 83'; Rose 93'	Referee: Richard Malcolm

Southern Region

15 May 2021	Geraldine (4)	0–3	Queenstown Rovers (3)	Geraldine Domain, Geraldine
14:00		Report	Reid 53'; Beveridge 56'; Bjorck 70'	Referee: Aaron Collins

15 May 2021	Timaru Thistle (4)	1–6	Green Island (2)	Anzac Square, Timaru
14:00	Linton 85'	Report	Hewson 14', 41'; Heath 38'; Anderson 52', 69'; Brazier 90+6'	Referee: Jan-Hendrik Kuepper

15 May 2021	Roslyn-Wakari (3)	1–3	South City Royals (2)	Ellis Park, Dunedin
14:00	Wilkie 34'	Report	August 44'; Petersen 76'; Neil 84'	Referee: Jack Henderson

15 May 2021	Mosgiel (3)	5–0	West End (4)	Memorial Park, Mosgiel
14:00	Ali 36'; Wall 41', 46', 70'; Findlay 77'	Report		Referee: Wayne van Gorp

15 May 2021	Wanaka (3)	4–0	Queens Park (4)	Wānaka Recreation Centre, Wānaka
14:00	Dickson 4'; Pleskun 17', 73'; Roode 63'	Report		Referee: Lindsey Robinson

15 May 2021	Gore Wanderers (4)	3–2	Grants Braes (4)	Hyde Park, Gore
14:00	Boland 69', 72'; de Jong 80' (pen.)	Report	Smith 6'; Gorman 60'	Referee: Craig Campbell

All teams listed below received byes to the second round.

Northern Region: Auckland United FC, North Shore United AFC, Auckland City FC, Bay Olympic, Eastern Suburbs, Manukau United, Western Springs, Birkenhead United, Northern Rovers, West Coast Rangers, Hamilton Wanderers, Melville United, Albany United, Waitemata, Metro, Mt Albert Ponsonby
Capital Region: Wainuiomata, Wairarapa United, Western Suburbs, Wellington Olympic, Lower Hutt City, Miramar Rangers
Mainland: Nelson Suburbs
Southern: Otago University, Northern

=== Round 2 ===
All matches were played on Queen's Birthday weekend 5–7 June 2021. This round contained one team from level 8, Whangarei, the lowest ranked team left in the competition. A full list of results are as follows:

Northern Region

5 June 2021	Hamilton Wanderers (2)	5–5 (a.e.t.) (8–7 p)	East Coast Bays (3)	Porritt Stadium, Hamilton
13:00	Signey 19', 40'; Semmy 39', 105'; Tieku 55'	Report	McMinn 17', 93' (pen.); Singh 62'; Wilson 88', 90'	Referee: Benjamin Norman

5 June 2021	Auckland United (1)	9–0	Cambridge (4)	Waikaraka Park, Auckland
14:00	Duncan 37'; Ozawa 46', 53'; Redfearn 59', 60'; Zambrano 62', 75', 82'; Murati 84'	Report		Referee: Hayden Tutbury

5 June 2021	Onehunga Mangere United (4)	3–4 (a.e.t.)	Mount Albert-Ponsonby (3)	Māngere Domain, Māngere
14:00	Manko 23', 78' (pen.), 103'	Report	Black 33' (pen.); Picken 48'; Sinclair 101', 109'	Referee: Riley Greenbury

5 June 2021	West Hamilton United (5)	3–0*	Northern Rovers (2)	Weka Street, Hamilton
14:00		Report	Quinlan 6', 35'; Messenger 11'; Al-Kalisy 86'	Referee: Andres Castro
Note: Northern Rovers won 4–0 however they were deemed to have fielded an ineligible player and the result was overturned.

5 June 2021	Melville United (2)	5–0	Waitemata (3)	Gower Park, Hamilton
14:00	Hunter-Ali 9'; Reynolds 54'; K.Richards 75'; E.Richards 77'; Lawrence 82'	Report		Referee: Phillip Rogers

5 June 2021	Auckland City (1)	7–0	Ellerslie (3)	Kiwitea Street, Auckland
14:00	Thurston 34', 50'; Manickum 38'; Vollenhoven 57', 90+1'; Kaltak 63'; Ellis 85'	Report		Referee: Mazhar Batoor

5 June 2021	Waiheke United (3)	12–1	Whangarei (8)	Onetangi Sports Park, Waiheke Island
14:00	Llunes 5'; Canay 8', 14', 20', 45+2', 53', 57'; Vanina 29'; Villasana 44'; Latorre 63', 65'; Timmins-Scanlon 83'	Report	Hudson 45'	Referee: Glen Lochrie

5 June 2021	Bay Olympic (2)	4–3 (a.e.t.)	Western Springs (2)	Olympic Park, Auckland
14:00	Bonkovich 5', 88' (pen.); Han 96'; Colligan 105'	Report	Schnell 67'; Kautoga 74'; Straffon 106'	Referee: Nick Waldron

5 June 2021	West Auckland (5)	1–2	Tauranga City (3)	Brains Park, Auckland
14:00	Peden 89'	Report	Grieve 43'; Higgins 57'	Referee: Allan Wilson

5 June 2021	North Shore United (2)	3–1	Ranui Swanson (5)	Allen Hill Stadium, North Shore
14:00	Nkoy 10'; Lee 45'; Kettle 90'	Report	Bashir 40'	Referee: Luke Gardner

5 June 2021	Ngaruawahia United (5)	2–1	West Coast Rangers (2)	Centennial Park, Ngaruawahia
14:00	Marquez 1'; Shackleton 56'	Report	Machuca 16'	Referee: Andy Holdsworth

5 June 2021	Franklin United (4)	0–6	Birkenhead United (1)	Drury Sportsgrounds, Drury
17:00		Report	McArthur 4'; Connor-McClean 13', 73'; Greive 21', 58'; Probert 90+2'	Referee: Ashley Wilson

5 June 2021	Papakura City (5)	3–3 (a.e.t.) (4–2 p)	Metro (3)	McLennan Park, Auckland
17:00	Martin 37', 90'; Dixon 90'	Report	Fa'Alogo-Lilo 74', 90'; Shin 90'	Referee: Mark Fleming

6 June 2021	Albany United (3)	0–4	Eastern Suburbs (1)	Rosedale Park, Auckland
14:00		Report	Mechell 29', 63'; Built 57', 66'	Referee: Chris Trent

7 June 2021	Claudelands Rovers (4)	4–5	Manukau City (2)	Galloway Park, Hamilton
14:00	Bayliss 4'; Christensen-Rose 8'; Clark 11'; Webster 61' (pen.)	Report	Estay 35', 39'; Shah 37'; Pasagic 45', 82'	Referee: Ben Norman

7 June 2021	Waikato Unicol (5)	0–1	Manurewa (3)	Jansen Park, Hamilton
14:00		Report	Giovanni 21'	Referee: Robbie Maris

Capital / Central Region

7 June 2021	Wellington United (3)	1–4	Wellington Olympic (1)	Newtown Park, Wellington
14:00	Stephan 63'	Report	Walker 14'; Mata 32' (pen.); Sinclair 66'; Davenport Petersen 74'	Referee: Aaron Clarke

7 June 2021	Stop Out (3)	4–1	Kapiti Coast United (4)	Hutt Park, Lower Hutt
14:00	Kelly 15'; Sutcliffee 49'; Hibbard 60' (o.g.); Tuck 72'	Report	Shiers 11'	Referee: Russell Underwood

7 June 2021	Miramar Rangers (1)	5–0	Havelock North Wanderers (3)	David Farrington Park, Wellington
14:00	Moreira 10'; Barnett 17'; Akers 58'; Whyte 86'; Bevin 86'	Report		Referee: Chris Bennett

7 June 2021	North Wellington (2)	4–0	Wainuiomata (2)	Alex Moore Park, Wellington
14:00	Randall 8', 90'; Mulholland 10'; Hoy 45'	Report		Referee: Dom Barry

7 June 2021	Tawa (3)	2–3	Waterside Karori (2)	Redwood Park, Wellington
14:00	Rose 40'; Hill 56'	Report	Driehuis 30' (pen.), 51'; Cordwell 43'	Referee: Robert Swiney

7 June 2021	Wairarapa United (2)	2–4	Napier City Rovers (2)	RV Hullena Park, Masterton
14:00	Cunniff 78'; Roubos 81'	Report	Madsen 10'; Wall 13'; Emerson 32', 54'	Referee: Mark Whitehead

7 June 2021	Lower Hutt City (2)	6–0	Island Bay United (3)	Fraser Park, Lower Hutt
14:00	Bidois 23', 41', 70'; Ott 32' (pen.); Bark 60'; Mogg 64'	Report		Referee: Sean Reilly

7 June 2021	Western Suburbs (1)	4–0	Upper Hutt City (3)	Endeavour Park, Porirua
14:00	Gillion 23', 40'; Penney 28'; Gatkek 58'	Report		Referee: John Rowbury

Mainland Region

7 June 2021	Rangers (Blenheim) (5)	1–2	Nelson Suburbs (2)	A & P Park, Blenheim
14:00	Waechter 55'	Report	Ridsdale 3'; Tucker 82'	Referee: Martin Fenwick

7 June 2021	Coastal Spirit (2)	8–0	Burwood (4)	Linfield Park, Christchurch
14:00	Cotter 40', 76', 90'; Hogan 69', 71', 83', 84'; Zimmerman 87'	Report		Referee: Aaron Nottage

7 June 2021	Ferrymead Bays (3)	0–3	Christchurch United (2)	Ferrymead Park, Christchurch
14:00		Report	Wilkinson 37'; McClay 75'; Chrétien 86'

7 June 2021	Cashmere Technical (1)	4–0	Selwyn United (1)	Garrick Memorial Park, Christchurch
14:00	Matthysen 29'; Angus 55'; Donkers 76'; Taguchi 80'	Report		Referee: Mike Killick

Southern Region

7 June 2021	Wanaka (3)	5–1	Gore Wanderers (4)	Wānaka Recreation Centre, Wānaka
14:00	Breed 15' (o.g.); Tinka 40', 45'; Pleskun 59'; Dickson 70'	Report	McFadzien 67'	Referee: Chris Rhoades

7 June 2021	Northern (3)	2–5 (a.e.t.)	Green Island (2)	Forrester Park, Dunedin
14:00	Al Mawali 10'; Green 90'	Report	Anderson 66'; Spear 89'; Milton 90' (pen.); Hewson 90', 90'	Referee: Will Dymond

7 June 2021	South City Royals (2)	2–1 (a.e.t.)	Mosgiel (3)	Caledonian Ground, Dunedin
14:00	Chadwick 79'; Neil 103'	Report	Ali 8' (pen.)	Referee: Aaron Collins

7 June 2021	Queenstown Rovers (3)	0–1	Otago University (2)	Queenstown Events Centre, Queenstown
14:00		Report	Watanabe 22'	Referee: Craig Campbell

=== Round 3 ===
All matches were played on the weekend of 18–20 June 2021. This round contained three teams from level 5, Papakura City, West Hamilton United, and Ngaruawahia United, the lowest ranked teams left in the competition. A full list of results are as follows:

Northern Region

19 June 2021	Waiheke United (3)	5–1	Papakura City (5)	Onetangi Sports Park, Waiheke Island
14:00	Timmins-Scalon 18', 35'; Lindner 41', 68'; Amad 56' (pen.)	Report	Hart 75'	Referee: Nick Waldron

19 June 2021	Melville United (2)	1–0 (a.e.t.)	Mt Albert Ponsonby (3)	Gower Park, Hamilton
14:00	Lagos 112'	Report		Referee: Andy Holdsworth

19 June 2021	North Shore United (2)	3–0	Eastern Suburbs (1)	Allen Hill Stadium, North Shore
14:00	Porter 17'; Nkoy 24'; Memedovic 67'	Report		Referee: Luke Gardner

19 June 2021	Bay Olympic (2)	3–1	Manurewa (3)	Olympic Park, Auckland
14:00	Nash 37'; White 48'	Report	Perez 32'	Referee: Ashley Wilson

19 June 2021	Auckland City (1)	7–2	Tauranga City (3)	Kiwitea Street, Auckland
14:00	Drake 18'; Howieson 24', 74'; Manickum 29', 85', 90'; Kilkolly 45'	Report	Mitchell 13' (o.g.); Carter 57'	Referee: Riley Greenbury

19 June 2021	West Hamilton United (5)	1–2	Ngaruawahia United (5)	Weka Street, Hamilton
14:00	Mire 9' (pen.)	Report	Marquez 7'; Shackleton 30'	Referee: Andrew Lamberth

20 June 2021	Birkenhead United (1)	1–0	Auckland United (1)	Shepherds Park, North Shore
14:00	Burfoot 82'	Report		Referee: Mazhar Batoor

20 June 2021	Hamilton Wanderers (2)	5–0	Manukau United (2)	Porritt Stadium, Hamilton
14:00	Tieku 27', 75'; Semmy 55'; Jones 57'; Contratti 86' (pen.)	Report		Referee: Benjamin Norman

Central / Capital Region

19 June 2021	Waterside Karori (2)	3–2	Stop Out (3)	Karori Park, Wellington
14:00	Parker 2', 41'; Lack 13'	Report	Arkinstall 23'; Postlethwaite 61'	Referee: John Rowbury

19 June 2021	Miramar Rangers (1)	4–1	North Wellington (2)	David Farrington Park, Wellington
14:00	Midgley 7'; Zeb 56'; Mason-Smith 83'; Bredeveldt 84'	Report	Mulholland 15'	Referee: Chris Bennett

20 June 2021	Lower Hutt City (2)	2–1	Wellington Olympic (1)	Fraser Park, Lower Hutt
14:00	Hillis 5'; Bidois 34'	Report	Mata 75' (pen.)	Referee: Nigel Piper

20 June 2021	Western Suburbs (1)	3–0	Napier City Rovers (2)	Endeavour Park, Porirua
14:00	Ingham 5', 70' (pen.); Van Rijssel 19'	Report		Referee: Dom Barry

Mainland

18 June 2021	Christchurch United (2)	4–3	Coastal Spirit (2)	Christchurch Football Centre, Christchurch
19:30	Weston 7' (o.g.); McClay 14', 33'; Colloty 80'	Report	Spain 45'; Cotter 65'; Rai 73'	Referee: Nick Burnett

19 June 2021	Cashmere Technical (1)	7–3	Nelson Suburbs (2)	Garrick Memorial Park, Christchurch
13:00	Matthysen 14', 26'; Taguchi 16'; Coughlan 30'; Tyndall 32', 59'; Boys 90'	Report	Moffat 51', 55'; Hogg 70'	Referee: Jack Henderson

Southern Region

19 June 2021	Wanaka (3)	0–4	South City Royals (2)	Wānaka Recreation Centre, Wānaka
14:00		Report	Turner 20', 39'; Neil 35'; Fleming 45'	Referee: Lindsey Robinson

19 June 2021	Green Island (2)	1–5	Otago University (2)	Sunnyvale Park, Dunedin
14:00	Hewson 72'	Report	Hawkins 5', 28'; Kelly 36'; Watanabe 36', 79'	Referee: Craig Campbell

=== Round 4 ===
All matches were played on the weekend of 10–11 July 2021. This round contained one team from level 5, Ngaruawahia United, the lowest ranked team left in the competition.

Northern Region

10 July 2021	North Shore United (2)	1–0	Waiheke United (3)	Allen Hill Stadium, North Shore
14:00	Porter 2' (pen.)	Report		Referee: Mazhar Batoor

10 July 2021	Melville United (2)	2–1	Bay Olympic (2)	Gower Park, Hamilton
14:00	Richards 3'; McIsaac 38'	Report	Han 41'	Referee: Andrew Lamberth

10 July 2021	Hamilton Wanderers (2)	5–1	Ngaruawahia United (5)	Porritt Stadium, Hamilton
14:00	Pratt 4', 81', 83'; Semmy 66'; Comber 74'	Report	Shackleton 80'	Referee: Andy Holdsworth

11 July 2021	Birkenhead United (1)	3–3 (a.e.t.) (1–3 p)	Auckland City (1)	Shepherds Park, North Shore
14:00	Connor-McLean 40'; Issa 65'; Turner 96'	Report	Kilkolly 12' (pen.); Vale 28'; Howieson 100'	Referee: Hayden Tutbury

Capital / Central Region

10 July 2021	Miramar Rangers (1)	4–1	Lower Hutt City (2)	David Farrington Park, Wellington
13:00	Mason-Smith 22', 45' (pen.), 57'; Surman 78' (o.g.)	Report	Bark 25'	Referee: Matthew Conger

11 July 2021	Western Suburbs (1)	2–0	Waterside Karori (2)	Endeavour Park, Porirua
14:00	Stroud 60'; Clayton 79'	Report		Referee: Chris Bennett

Mainland / Southern Region

10 July 2021	South City Royals (2)	1–4	Otago University (2)	Tahuna Park, Dunedin
11:00	Neaverson 89'	Report	Hawkins 3'; Rathbone 10'; Watanabe 73'; Chang 90'	Referee: Jack Henderson

10 July 2021	Cashmere Technical (1)	3–0	Christchurch United (2)	Garrick Memorial Park, Christchurch
14:00	Matthysen 15'; Coughlan 19', 27' (pen.)	Report		Referee: Luke Gardner

=== Quarter-finals ===
The quarter-finals were played on the weekend of 31 July–1 August 2021.

This round featured eight teams from the National League regional leagues (level 2), including four competing in the Championship phase (level 1).

31 July 2021	Hamilton Wanderers (2)	0–4	Cashmere Technical (1)	Porritt Stadium, Hamilton
14:00		Report	Coughlan 37', 77'; Tongue 61'; Taguchi 90'	Referee: Andrew Lamberth

31 July 2021	North Shore United (2)	2–2 (a.e.t.) (6–5 p)	Otago University (2)	Allen Hill Stadium, North Shore
14:00	James 16': Memedović 42'	Report	Barbour-Ryan idan 60'; O'Farrell 82'	Referee: Chris Bennett

31 July 2021	Miramar Rangers (1)	2–0	Auckland City (1)	David Farrington Park, Wellington
14:00	Moreira 8'; Bevin 74'	Report		Referee: Calvin Berg

31 July 2021	Western Suburbs (1)	1–0	Melville United (2)	Endeavour Park, Porirua
14:00	Sabo 65'	Report		Referee: Luke Gardner

=== Semi-finals ===
The semi-finals were meant to be played on the weekend of 21–22 August 2021 however due to a COVID-19 outbreak and the country going into lockdown, the games were postponed.

This round featured four teams from the National League regional leagues (level 2) including three competing in the Championship phase (level 1).

3 October 2021	Cashmere Technical (1)	1–0	Western Suburbs (1)	Garrick Memorial Park, Christchurch
13:00	Taguchi 88'	Report		Referee: Calvin Berg

20 February 2022	Miramar Rangers (1)	w/o	North Shore United (2)	Newtown Park, Wellington
14:00		Report		Referee: John Rowbury
Note: Due to Covid, North Shore United withdrew from the competition

=== Final ===
The final was originally meant to be played on the 8 September 2021. It instead was delayed until the 6 March 2022.

6 March 2022
14:00

Cashmere Technical	4–2	Miramar Rangers
Coughlan 42' (pen.), 65'; Taguchi 60', 89'	Report	O'Brien 75'; Wood 84'

Jerry Collins Stadium, Porirua
Attendance: 0 (Note: Played behind closed doors.)
Referee: Calvin Berg

Cashmere Technical	Miramar Rangers

GK	25	(New Zealand) Danny Knight
RB	32	(New Zealand) Luke Tongue
CB	5	(New Zealand) Andrew Storer
CB	6	(England) Tom Schwarz (c)
LB	33	(England) Daniel Boys	(yellow card) 57'
RM	8	(New Zealand) Jacob Richards		(substituted off) 81'
CM	16	(New Zealand) Fraser Angus
CM	17	(New Zealand) Cory Mitchell	(yellow card) 73'
LM	19	(South Africa) Lyle Matthysen		(substituted off) 90+4'
CF	10	(Republic of Ireland) Garbhan Coughlan
CF	28	(Japan) Yuya Taguchi		(substituted off) 90+4'
Substitutes:
GK	13	(New Zealand) Harrison Rowe
MF	15	(New Zealand) Sam Lapslie
MF	21	(New Zealand) Declan Tyndall		(substituted on) 81'
MF	25	(New Zealand) Tom Cairns
FW	23	(New Zealand) Yusuf van Dam
FW	24	(New Zealand) Kian Donkers		(substituted on) 90+4'
FW	34	(New Zealand) Alex Ballard		(substituted on) 90+4'
Head coach:
(England) Dan Schwarz

GK	25	(New Zealand) Ryan Foord
CB	16	(New Zealand) Flynn O'Brien
CB	6	(New Zealand) Taylor Schrijvers
CB	18	(New Zealand) Liam Wood
RWB	2	(New Zealand) Scott Midgley
CM	8	(New Zealand) Sam Dewar (c)	(yellow card) 15'	(substituted off) 84'
CM	3	(France) Hugo Delhommelle
LWB	19	(New Zealand) Haris Zeb
RF	20	(New Zealand) Nathan Simes		(substituted off) 61'
CF	7	(New Zealand) Owen Barnett
LF	14	(England) Sam Mason-Smith
Substitutes:
GK	1	(New Zealand) Jacob Daly
MF	12	(New Zealand) Andrew Bevin
MF	13	(New Zealand) Max Falkoner		(substituted on) 84'
FW	10	(New Zealand) Jorge Akers
FW	17	(Portugal) João Moreira		(substituted on) 61'
FW	23	(New Zealand) Oliver Stanish
Head coach:
(England) Scott Hales

Jack Batty Memorial Cup:
Yuya Taguchi (Cashmere Technical)

Assistant referees:
Ashton Davenport
Cameron Gruschow
Fourth official:
Chris Bennett

Match rules

- 90 minutes.
- 30 minutes of extra time if necessary.
- Penalty shoot-out if scores still level.
- Seven named substitutes.
- Maximum of three substitutions.

== Notes ==
The tier that teams are in (as indicated in brackets next to their name) are based on the New Zealand football league system for the 2021 season. As some teams can qualify and play in more than one league (and tier) per season, the highest tier that they take part in is the one noted next to their name.
