= 2003 Chatham Cup =

Tournament details
- Venue(s): North Harbour Stadium, North Shore
- Dates: 17 August 2003

Final positions
- Champions: University-Mount Wellington (7th title)
- Runners-up: Melville United

Awards
- Jack Batty Memorial Cup: Kara Waetford (University-Mount Wellington)

The 2003 Chatham Cup was the 76th annual nationwide knockout football competition in New Zealand.

Up to the last 16 of the competition, the cup was run in three regions (northern, central, and southern), with an open draw from the quarter-finals on. In all, 131 teams took part in the competition. The competition consisted of a preliminary round and five rounds proper before quarter-finals, semi-finals, and a final. Golden goal extra time was played in ties which finished level at full time.

== The 2003 final ==
Derek Rugg became the first referee since G. Jackson in the 1920s and 1930s to control three Chatham Cup finals, having previously refereed the 2000 and 2002 finals. In the final University-Mount Wellington subdued Melville United, running out 3–1 winners.

The Jack Batty Memorial Cup is awarded to the player adjudged to have made to most positive impact in the Chatham Cup final. The winner of the 2003 Jack Batty Memorial Cup was Kara Waetford of University-Mount Wellington.

== Results ==
=== Third round ===
Auckland Grammar	1 – 5	Waitakere City

Caversham	4 – 0	Nomads United (Christchurch)

Central United (Auckland)	6 – 3	Te Atatu

Fencibles United (Auckland)	1 – 0	Papakura

Gisborne Thistle	0 – 1	Havelock North Wanderers

Glenfield Rovers	5 – 0	Hamilton Wanderers

Greerton Rovers	6 – 1	Papatoetoe

Island Bay United	2 – 0	Seatoun

Lower Hutt City	4 – 0	Wanganui East Athletic

Manawatu (Palmerston North)	5 – 0	Waterside Karori

Mangere United	0 – 0*	North Shore United

Manurewa	4 – 0	Central United (Brown)

Melville United	2 – 1	Tauranga City United

Mount Albert Grammar	4 – 3	Oratia United

Nelson Suburbs	1 – 2	Christchurch Rangers

NZ Celtic Supporters (Auckland)	1 – 0	Birkenhead United

Northern (Dunedin)	0 – 2	Roslyn-Wakari

Otahuhu United	6 – 1	F.O.S.S. United (Hamilton)

Palmerston North Marist	0 – 4	Napier City Rovers

Peringa United (New Plymouth)	5 – 0	Massey University

Petone	1 – 2	Brooklyn Northern United

Red Sox (Palmerston North)	2 – 0	Gisborne City

Taupo	2 – 1	West Auckland

University-Mount Wellington	3 – 1	Eastern Suburbs (Auckland)

Upper Hutt City	2 – 3	Wellington United

Wainuiomata	2 – 2*	Wellington College

Wellington Olympic	6 – 1	Wellington Marist

Western (Christchurch)	0 – 2	Halswell United

Western Springs	2 – 1	Bay Olympic (Auckland)

Western Suburbs FC (Porirua)	3 – 1	Miramar Rangers

West Hamilton United	2 – 1	Bohemian Celtic (Auckland)

Whakatane Town	3 – 2	Hamilton Boys HSOB

* Won on penalties by North Shore (8–7) and Wellington College (4–3)

=== Fourth round ===
Brooklyn Northern United	4 – 0	Lower Hutt City

Fencibles United	9 – 1	NZ Celtic Supporters

Halswell United	1 – 2	Christchurch Rangers

Havelock North Rangers	3 – 1	Wellington Olympic

Island Bay United	1 – 0	Wellington College

Manawatu	8 – 0	Peringa United

Manurewa	0 – 2	Central United

Melville United	3 – 2	Waitakere City

Mount Albert Grammar	0 – 4	University-Mount Wellington

North Shore United	1 – 0	Glenfield Rovers

Otahuhu United	1 – 2	Greerton Rovers

Red Sox	1 – 4	Western Suburbs FC

Roslyn-Wakari	3 – 2	Caversham

Taupo	0 – 1	Western Springs

Wellington United	3 – 2	Napier City Rovers

West Hamilton United	3 – 2	Whakatane Town

=== Fifth round ===
6 July

Central United	2 – 0	Fencibles United
Spirovski, Major

13 July

Christchurch Rangers	2 – 1 (aet)	Roslyn-Wakari
Hughes, Egues		Lamont

5 July

Greerton Rovers	1 – 5	University-Mount Wellington
Anderson (pen.)		Thou ×2, McCormack, Root, Waetford (pen.)

12 July

Island Bay United	3 – 2 (aet)	Western Suburbs FC
Hannah ×2, Terry (pen.)		Carnahan ×2

12 July

Lower Hutt City	4 – 2	Havelock North Wanderers
Garcias ×2, Bartosh, Richmond		Mihaljovic, McCourt

6 July

Melville United	8 – 0	Western Springs
Holloway ×3, Watene ×2, Cooper, Field, Yugov

6 July

Wellington United	2 – 3 (aet)	Manawatu
Candy, Rowe		Old, Ayloff, Halstead

5 July

West Hamilton United	1 – 4	North Shore United
Michie		Stevens ×2, Coombes, Webster

=== Quarter-finals ===
20 July

Christchurch Rangers	0 – 1	University-Mount Wellington
		Ellensohn

19 July

Island Bay United	0 – 3	Central United
		Koprivcic ×2, Major (pen.)

19 July

Lower Hutt City	1 – 0	Manawatu
Malivuk

20 July

Melville United	5 – 0	North Shore United
Holloway 2 (1 pen.), Wilkinson, o.g.

=== Semi-finals ===
3 August

Central United	0 – 1	Melville United
		Watene

2 August

Lower Hutt City	2 – 3 (aet)	University-Mount Wellington
o.g., Lockhead (pen.)		Waugh ×3

=== Final ===
17 August

University-Mount Wellington	3 – 1	Melville United
McCormack ×2, Waugh		Watene

North Harbour Stadium, North Shore
Referee: D. Rugg
