= 2000 Chatham Cup =

Tournament details
- Venue(s): North Harbour Stadium, North Shore
- Dates: 9 September 2000

Final positions
- Champions: Napier City Rovers (3rd title)
- Runners-up: Central United

Awards
- Jack Batty Memorial Cup: Jimmy Cudd (Napier City Rovers)

The 2000 Chatham Cup was the 73rd annual nationwide knockout football competition in New Zealand.

Up to the last 16 of the competition, the cup was run in three regions (northern, central, and southern), with an open draw from the quarter-finals on. National League teams received a bye until the Fourth Round (last 32). In all, 123 teams took part in the competition. Note: Different sources give different numberings for the rounds of the competition. Some record five rounds prior to the quarter-finals; others note a qualifying round followed by four full rounds.

== The 2000 final ==
Napier City Rovers won the league/cup double. As the league changed from a club competition to one contested by regional franchises in 2004, they were the last team ever to do so.

The Jack Batty Memorial Cup is awarded to the player adjudged to have made to most positive impact in the Chatham Cup final. The winner of the 2008 Jack Batty Memorial Cup was Jimmy Cudd of Napier City Rovers.

== Results ==
=== Third Round ===
Albany United	1 – 2	Fencibles United (Auckland)

Auckland Grammar	1 – 5	Tauranga City United

Bay Olympic (Auckland)	1 – 0	North Shore United

Drury United	2 – 3	Warkworth

Eastern Suburbs (Auckland)	1 – 0	Glenfield Rovers

Ellerslie	4 – 3	Taupo

Green Island	0 – 5	Caversham

Hamilton Wanderers	3 – 1	East Coast Bays

Island Bay United	3 – 2	Tawa

Kapiti Hearts (Raumati)	4 – 1	Upper Hutt City

Moturoa	2 – 1	Waterside Karori

New Brighton	0 – 1	Halswell United

Ngaruawahia United	3 – 0	Hibiscus Coast

Northland United (Whangarei)	1 – 8	Takapuna City

North Wellington	0 – 2	Lower Hutt City

Petone	1 – 2	Wellington Olympic

Queenstown Rovers	1 – 3	Christchurch Rangers

Taradale	2 – 5	Wellington United

Te Awamutu	2 – 3	Claudelands Rovers

Three Kings United (Auckland)	1 – 3	Onehunga Sports

Wairarapa United (Masterton)	2 – 3	Gisborne City

West Auckland	0 – 0 (aet)*	Birkenhead United

* Won on penalties by Birkenhead United (8–7)

=== Fourth Round ===
Bay Olympic	3 – 3 (aet)*	Ellerslie

Birkenhead United	1 – 6	Tauranga City United

Christchurch City	0 – 5	Dunedin Technical

Claudelands Rovers	0 – 2	Metro (Auckland)

Eastern Suburbs	3 – 2	Fencibles United

Gisborne City	2 – 4	Miramar Rangers

Halswell United	2 – 0	Caversham

Hamilton Wanderers	0 – 2	Central United (Auckland)

Island Bay United	0 - 0 (a.e.t.)	Moturoa
Penalties
	4 - 3

Kapiti Hearts	1 – 2	Wellington United

Napier City Rovers	1 – 0	Lower Hutt City

Nelson Suburbs	5 – 1	Christchurch Rangers

Onehunga Sports	5 – 0	Warkworth

Takapuna City	0 – 4	University-Mount Wellington

Waitakere City	11 – 0	Ngaruawahia United

Wellington Olympic	1 – 0	Manawatu (Palmerston North)

* Won on penalties by Bay Olympic (5–4)

=== Fifth Round ===
2 July

Central United	2 – 1 (aet)	Bay Olympic
Koprivcic, Vuksich		Woodhams

1 July

Eastern Suburbs	0 – 6	University-Mount Wellington
		Buhagiar 2, Harris 2, Kenyon, Roberts

1 July

Halswell United	1 – 4 (aet)	Napier City Rovers
Quilter		McIvor, Pilcher, Akers, Gearey

1 July

Metro	4 – 2	Tauranga City United
Phommahaxay, McNeil, Curteis, Hird (pen.)		Creighton, Derry

2 July

Nelson Suburbs	1 – 3 (aet)	Dunedin Technical

2 July

Waitakere City	6 – 1	Onehunga Sports
Gillies 2, Farac, McKenna, Viljoen, Edwards		Clare

2 July

Wellington Olympic	0 – 2	Miramar Rangers

1 July

Wellington United	3 – 1	Island Bay United
Clare 2, Walla		Sule (o.g.)

=== Quarter-finals ===
30 July

Central United	4 – 3	Metro
Major 2 (1 pen.), de Jong, Mack		Hird (pen.), McNeil, Green

Kiwitea Street, Auckland
Referee: T. Cawte
30 July

Dunedin Technical	2 – 1	University-Mount Wellington
Waetford, Svenstrup		Smith

30 July

Napier City Rovers	1 – 0	Waitakere City
Cudd

30 July

Wellington United	2 – 4 (aet)	Miramar Rangers
Pine, Foldi (pen.)		Oughton 2, Satos, Bernard

=== Semi-finals ===
20 August

Central United	1 – 0	Dunedin Technical
Mack

20 August

Napier City Rovers	4 – 1	Miramar Rangers
Akers 2, McIvor, Cudd		Patrick

=== Final ===
9 September

Napier City Rovers	4 – 1	Central United
Cudd, McIvor, Ravenhill, Birnie		Mack

North Harbour Stadium, North Shore
Referee: D. Rugg
