= 2001 Chatham Cup =

Tournament details
- Venue(s): North Harbour Stadium, North Shore
- Dates: 15 September 2001

Final positions
- Champions: University-Mount Wellington (6th title)
- Runners-up: Central United

Awards
- Jack Batty Memorial Cup: Paul Bunbury (University-Mount Wellington)

The 2001 Chatham Cup was the 74th annual nationwide knockout football competition in New Zealand.

Up to the last 16 of the competition, the cup was run in three regions (northern, central, and southern), with central and southern regions combining at the fourth round and an open draw from the quarter-finals on. National League teams received a bye until the Fourth Round. In all, 136 teams took part in the competition. Note: Different sources give different numberings for the rounds of the competition. Some record five rounds prior to the quarter-finals; others note a preliminary round followed by four full rounds. The former system is used in this article.

Tied matches were decided by golden goal extra time and penalty shoot-outs.

== The 2001 final ==
University-Mount Wellington and Central United played out a six-goal draw before the match went to penalties. This came down to the tenth kick, with University-Mount Wellington winning 5–4.

The Jack Batty Memorial Cup is awarded to the player adjudged to have made to most positive impact in the Chatham Cup final. The winner of the 2001 Jack Batty Memorial Cup was Paul Bunbury of University-Mount Wellington.

== Results ==
=== Third round ===
Brooklyn-Northern United	1–2	Wellington United

Christchurch United	0–0*	Western (Christchurch)

Eastern Suburbs (Auckland)	5–0	Manurewa

Ellerslie	6–1	Te Atatu

Forrest Hill Milford United	1–1*	Melville United (Hamilton)

Glenfield Rovers	4–0	Fencibles United (Auckland)

Green Island	2–6	Caversham

Greerton Rovers	1–2	Bay Olympic (Auckland)

Lower Hutt City	4–1	Island Bay United

Mangere United	2–0	Onehunga-Mangere United

Wellington Marist	0–2	Tawa

Marlborough United (Blenheim)	5–2	Avon United (Christchurch)

Mount Albert Grammar	4–2	Western Springs

Mount Albert-Ponsonby	1–2	Birkenhead United

North Shore United	2–1	Oratia United

Papatoetoe	1–1*	Taupo

Petone	0–0*	Waterside Karori

Takapuna	5–0	Hamilton Wanderers

Upper Hutt City	3–4	Western Suburbs FC (Porirua)

Waihopai (Invercargill)	3–1	HHH United (Invercargill)

Wellington Olympic	3–2	Moturoa

Woodleigh Cosmos	1–3	Wanganui East Athletic

* Won on penalties by Western (4–2), Melville United (4–3), Taupo (4–3), and Petone (5–4)

=== Fourth round ===
Bay Olympic	2–3	Central United (Auckland)

Caversham	0–2	Western

Christchurch City	3–1	Marlborough United

Dunedin Technical	5–0	Waihopai

Eastern Suburbs	4–1	Metro (Auckland)

Ellerslie	0–1	University-Mount Wellington

Glenfield Rovers	1–2	Waitakere City

Lower Hutt City	2–0	Wellington United

Manawatu (Palmerston North)	2–1	Wellington Olympic

Mangere United	0–1	Mount Albert Grammar

Napier City Rovers	1–0	Wanganui East Athletic

North Shore United	8–1	Birkenhead United

Petone	0–4	Miramar Rangers

Taupo	4–3	Takapuna

Tauranga City United	1–0	Melville United

Western Suburbs FC	1–2	Tawa

=== Fifth round ===
8 July

Central United	2–0	Waitakere City
Major 2 (1 pen.)

1 July

Christchurch City	5–4 (aet)	Miramar Rangers
Fisher 2, Sigmund, Letts, Duncan		Brown 2, Longley, Butterfield (pen.)

30 June

Eastern Suburbs	4–1	Taupo
A. Webber 2, Bola, Mills		Lamb

1 July

Lower Hutt City	1–2	Napier City Rovers
Foster		Akers, Pilcher

1 July

Tauranga City United	0–3	North Shore United
		Ward 2, McKenna

30 June

Tawa	0–1	Manawatu
		Seales

1 July

University-Mount Wellington	3–0	Mount Albert Grammar
Bunbury 2, McCormack

30 June

Western (Christchurch)	2–3	Dunedin Technical
Bell, Murphy		Kelly 2, Burgess

=== Quarter-finals ===
29 July

Central United	1–0	Napier City Rovers
Major (pen.)

28 July

Eastern Suburbs	2–1 (aet)	Dunedin Technical
M. Webber, A. Webber (pen.)		Bola (o.g.)

29 July

North Shore United	2–3	Christchurch City
Callinan, Sills		Sands 2, Hughes

29 July

University-Mount Wellington	2–0	Manawatu
Patterson, Bunbury

=== Semi-finals ===
2 September

Central United	3–1	Eastern Suburbs
Banks 2, Aliaga		Bola

Referee: N. Fox
2 September

University-Mount Wellington	2–0	Christchurch City
Temple, Polo

Referee: B. Precious

=== Final ===
15 September

University-Mount Wellington	3–3 (aet)	Central United
McCormack 2, Medhurst		Banks 2, Aliaga

North Harbour Stadium, North Shore
Referee: S. Sargent

University-Mount Wellington won 5–4 on penalties:

Bunbury (U-MtW) scored – 1–0
Major (Central) scored – 1–1
McCormack (U-MtW) scored – 2–1
Carmody (Central) scored – 2–2
Pearce (U-MtW) scored – 3–2
Aliaga (Central) scored – 3–3
Roberts (U-MtW) scored – 4–3
Banks (Central) scored – 4–4
Waetford (U-MtW) scored – 5–4 (kick was retaken after goalkeeper moved)
Greenhalgh (Central) missed – 5–4
