= 1980 Chatham Cup =

Tournament details
- Venue(s): Basin Reserve, Wellington
- Dates: 7 September 1980

Final positions
- Champions: Mount Wellington (2nd title)
- Runners-up: Dunedin City

The 1980 Chatham Cup was the 53rd annual nationwide knockout football competition in New Zealand.

Early stages of the competition were run in three regions (northern, central, and southern), with the National League teams receiving a bye until the Fourth Round of the competition. In all, 93 teams took part in the competition. Note: Different sources give different numberings for the rounds of the competition: some start round one with the beginning of the regional qualifications; others start numbering from the first national knock-out stage. The former numbering scheme is used in this article.

== The 1980 final ==
The match returned to its former regular home, the Basin Reserve, for the first time since 1972. Mount Wellington won the competition, becoming the third team to win the league/cup double. Dunedin City became the first side from that southern city to reach the final since Saint Kilda in 1965.

Te match was a dour affair, with the Mount scoring both of the goals. The first was scored after eleven minutes when a Clive Campbell corner was headed into the Dunedin goal by Stewart Carruthers — a welcome change from his sending off in the previous year's final. The second goal, from Billy McClure, was the highlight of the match.

== Results ==
=== Third Round ===
Cashmere Wanderers	1 – 0	Halswell United

Clendon United (Auckland)	1 – 2	Courier Rangers (Auckland)

Dunedin Technical	5 – 3	North End United

Glenfield Rovers (North Shore)	3 – 4	Whangarei City

Green Bay-Titirangi	0 – 1	Mount Roskill

Invercargill Thistle	3 – 2	Queens Park (Invercargill)

Kiwi United (Palmerston N.)	2 – 4	Manawatu United (Palmerston N.)

Masterton	3 – 2	Napier City Rovers

Ngaruawahia Affco United	0 – 0*	Rotorua City

Northern Hearts (Timaru)	4 – 2	Shamrock (Christchurch)

Oratia United	2 – 1	Mount Albert-Ponsonby

Otara Rangers	3 – 1	East Coast Bays

Stokes Valley	4 – 1	Wellington WMC

Takapuna City	1 – 0	Ellerslie

Tawa	3 – 3*	Wanganui East Athletic

Upper Hutt United	2 – 1	Miramar Rangers

Viard Old Boys (Porirua)	0 – 5	Porirua United

Waitara	0 – 4	Taranaki United (New Plymouth)

Waterside (Wellington)	0 – 3	Wellington City

Woolston WMC	2 – 0	Christchurch Technical

* Won on penalties by Ngaruawahia (4–2) and Wanganui (7–5)

=== Fourth Round ===
Blockhouse Bay	2 – 1	Mount Roskill

Christchurch United	4 – 1	Christchurch Rangers

Courier Rangers	1 – 2	Manurewa

Dunedin Technical	0 – 6	Dunedin City

Hamilton	2 – 0	North Shore United

Manawatu United	2 – 1	Masterton

Mount Wellington	3 – 1	Whangarei City

Nelson United	4 – 1	Wanganui East Athletic

Ngaruawahia Affco United	0 – 1	Otara Rangers

Northern Hearts	5 – 3	Cashmere Wanderers

Stokes Valley	1 – 2	Gisborne City

Takapuna City	7 – 0	Oratia United

Upper Hutt United	0 – 2	Stop Out (Lower Hutt)

Wellington City	2 – 1	Taranaki United

Wellington Diamond United	1 – 0	Porirua United

Woolston WMC	1 – 2	Invercargill Thistle

=== Fifth Round ===
Invercargill Thistle	1 – 3	Christchurch United

Manurewa	0 – 4	Mount Wellington

Nelson United	0 – 2	Gisborne City

Northern Hearts	2 – 5	Dunedin City

Otara Rangers	1 – 2	Blockhouse Bay

Stop Out	2 – 0	Manawatu United

Takapuna City	3 – 1	Hamilton

Wellington Diamond United	3 – 0	Wellington City

=== Quarter-finals ===
Christchurch United	2 – 0	Gisborne City

Dunedin City	4 – 1	Wellington Diamond United

Stop Out	0 – 2	Mount Wellington

Takapuna City	1 – 0 (aet)	Blockhouse Bay

=== Semi-finals ===
Christchurch United	0 – 1	Mount Wellington

Takapuna City	0 – 2	Dunedin City

=== Final ===
7 September 1980

Mount Wellington	2 – 0	Dunedin City
Carruthers, McClure

Basin Reserve, Wellington
Referee: G.W. Fleet
