= 2002 Chatham Cup =

Tournament details
- Venue(s): Bluewater Park Island, Napier
- Dates: 21 July 2002

Final positions
- Champions: Napier City Rovers (4th title)
- Runners-up: Tauranga City United

Awards
- Jack Batty Memorial Cup: Leon Birnie (Napier City Rovers)

The 2002 Chatham Cup was the 75th annual nationwide knockout football competition in New Zealand.

Up to the last 16 of the competition, the cup was run in three regions (northern, central, and southern), with an open draw from the quarter-finals on. The competition comprised a preliminary round and four rounds proper followed by quarter-finals, semi-finals, and a final. The competition was held considerably earlier in the year than normal, with the final being held in July rather than September. In all, 136 teams took part in the competition.

The nine eligible National League clubs entered the tournament at the third round stage. One National League side, Canterbury United, was ineligible, as it was an amalgamated team formed from several clubs within the Canterbury region, each of which competed in the Chatham Cup individually.

== The 2002 final ==
Napier City Rovers took the final 2–0 over Tauranga City United.

The Jack Batty Memorial Cup is awarded to the player adjudged to have made to most positive impact in the Chatham Cup final. The winner of the 2002 Jack Batty Memorial Cup was Leon Birnie of Napier City Rovers.

== Results ==
=== Second round ===
May

Caversham	2 – 0	Green Island

May

Ellerslie	3 – 1	Papatoetoe

May

Forrest Hill Milford United	1 – 2	Bay Olympic (Auckland)

May

Greerton Rovers	1 – 1*	East Coast Bays

May

Halswell United	2 – 1	Christchurch United

May

Havelock North Wanderers	1 – 0	Brooklyn Northern United

May

Lower Hutt City	4 – 1	Red Sox (Palmerston North)

May

Mangere United	3 – 1	Tikipunga

May

Manurewa	2 – 1	Western Springs

May

Melville United	1 – 1*	West Auckland

May

Mount Albert-Ponsonby	2 – 2*	Birkenhead United

May

Ngaruawahia United	2 – 3	Te Atatu

May

Otago University	0 – 1	Roslyn-Wakari

May

Palmerston North Marist	0 – 1	Western Suburbs FC (Porirua)

May

Papakura	2 – 4	Glenfield Rovers

May

Rangiora	1 – 1*	New Brighton

May

Takapuna	3 – 2	Auckland Grammar

May

Taradale	1 – 3	Moturoa

May

Three Kings United (Auckland)	4 – 3	Hamilton Wanderers

May

Wanganui East Athletic	0 – 3	Wellington United

May

Waterside Karori	1 – 2	Petone

May

Wellington Marist	0 – 0*	Island Bay United

May

Western (Christchurch)	0 – 1	Ferrymead Bays

* Won on penalties by East Coast Bays (2–1), Melville United (4–2), Mount Albert-Ponsonby (6–5), New Brighton (3–1), and Wellington Marist (4–3)

=== Third round ===
May

Caversham	1 – 0	Dunedin Technical

May

Central United (Auckland)	8 – 0	Takapuna

May

East Coast Bays	2 – 0	Te Atatu

May

Ellerslie	0 – 2	Bay Olympic

May

Ferrymead Bays	7 – 2	Roslyn-Wakari

May

Manawatu (Palmerston North)	6 – 1	Moturoa

May

Mangere United	6 – 1	Manurewa

May

Melville United	2 – 0	Mount Albert-Ponsonby

May

Miramar Rangers	5 – 1	Lower Hutt City

May

Napier City Rovers	4 – 1	Havelock North Wanderers

May

New Brighton	1 – 4	Halswell United

May

North Shore United	0 – 1	Waitakere City

May

Tauranga City United	4 – 0	Three Kings United

May

University-Mount Wellington	4 – 0	Glenfield Rovers

May

Wellington United	2 – 1	Petone

May

Western Suburbs FC	4 – 1	Wellington Marist

=== Fourth round ===
June

Bay Olympic	3 – 2	Mangere United

June

Caversham	3 – 1 †	Manawatu

June

Halswell United	1 – 0	Ferrymead Bays

June

Miramar Rangers	4 – 0	Western Suburbs FC

June

Tauranga City United	1 – 0	East Coast Bays

June

University-Mount Wellington	3 – 0	Melville United

June

Waitakere City	1 – 2	Central United

June

Wellington United	0 – 4	Napier City Rovers

† Caversham disqualified for fielding an ineligible player.

=== Quarter-finals ===
16 June

Central United	1 – 3	University-Mount Wellington
Quirke		Waetford, Bunbury (pen.), Roberts

16 June

Miramar Rangers	7 – 1	Halswell United

16 June

Napier City Rovers	1 – 0	Manawatu
Birnie

16 June

Tauranga City United	3 – 0	Bay Olympic
Pilcher ×2, Derry

=== Semi-finals ===
30 June

Napier City Rovers	4 – 2	Miramar Rangers
Cotton ×2, Cunliffe, Howe		Batty, Hedge

30 June

Tauranga City United	3 – 1	University-Mount Wellington
Board ×3		Roberts

=== Final ===
21 July

Napier City Rovers	2 – 0	Tauranga City United
Birnie, Scott

Bluewater Park Island, Napier
Referee: D. Rugg
