= Peter Henry =

Peter Henry may refer to:

- Peter Henry (captive) (1764–1858), American captive of Native Americans
- Peter Henry (bobsledder) (born 1962), New Zealand bobsledder and decathlete
- Peter Henry (footballer) (fl. 1983–1985), New Zealand footballer
- Peter Blair Henry (born 1969), Jamaican-born American economist

== See also ==
- Pete Henry (1897–1952), American football player and coach
