= Memorial Park, Mosgiel =

Public park and playground in Mosgiel, Dunedin, New Zealand

Memorial Park
- Mosgiel Memorial Gardens
- Interactive map of Memorial Park
- Type: Public park
- Location: Mosgiel, Dunedin, New Zealand
- Coordinates: 45.87008°S 170.34781°E
- Owner: Dunedin City Council
- Operator: Dunedin City Council
- Status: Open

Memorial Park, also known as the Mosgiel Memorial Gardens, is a public park and gardens located in Mosgiel a satellite town of Dunedin, New Zealand. The park contains a memorial garden, a variety of playground areas, picnic areas and nearby sports fields.

== Location ==
Memorial Park is located in central Mosgiel, near Gordon Road and Hartstonge Avenue, and is easily accessible from surrounding residential areas. The gardens and open spaces connect with pedestrian paths and link to nearby community facilities, including the Mosgiel Library and the Te Puna o Whakaehu.

== History ==
In 1967, the Mosgiel chapter of the Jaycees approached the Mosgiel Borough Council with plans for a botanic garden at the site, leading to the garden's initial design and establishment.

Playground facilities were later added in the 1990s, and community groups helped fund and develop improvements, including a major upgrade supported by the Taieri Community Facilities Trust in the 2000s. Further investment by the council in 2020 added inclusive play elements to enhance accessibility for all children and families.

In 2023, the nearby aquatic facility Te Puna o Whakaehu opened, reflecting broader community development in recent years. The park remains part of the council playground planning and upgrades.

== Facilities ==
Memorial Park is designed for visitors of all ages. It features gardens, picnic areas with benches, and walking paths. The playground offers several play zones, including inclusive equipment and a fenced area specifically for younger children. The park also has open grassy areas and sports fields used for football, athletics, cricket, and a variety of other recreational activities.

== Redevelopment plans ==
Memorial Park is part of Dunedin City Council's destination playground programme, which aims to upgrade major play spaces across the city.

Approximately NZ$3.07 million has been allocated for upgrades to the playground. Planned improvements include replacement of play equipment, improved accessibility, and better connections with nearby community facilities such as the Mosgiel Library and Te Puna o Whakaehu.
