= Grant Lightbown =

New Zealand footballer

Personal information
- Full name: Grant Lightbown
- Place of birth: New Zealand

Senior career*
Years	Team	Apps	(Gls)
- Mount Wellington

International career
1991	New Zealand	1	(0)
- * Club domestic league appearances and goals

Grant Lightbown is a New Zealand footballer. He represented New Zealand at international level.

Lightbown made a solitary official international appearance for New Zealand in a 1–2 loss to Australia on 15 May 1991.
