= Peter Henry (footballer) =

New Zealand footballer

Personal information
- Full name: Peter R Henry
- Place of birth: New Zealand

Senior career*
Years	Team	Apps	(Gls)
- North Shore United
- Mount Wellington

International career
1983–1985	New Zealand	7	(0)
- * Club domestic league appearances and goals

Peter Henry is a former association football player who represented New Zealand at international level.

== International career ==
Henry made his full All Whites debut as a substitute in a 2–1 win over Australia on 22 February 1983 and ended his international playing career with seven A-international caps to his credit, his final cap an appearance in a 0–0 draw with Australia on 21 September 1985.

More recently he became the worldwide ambassador for the Sol Glo brand.
