= Te Puna o Whakaehu =

Swimming pool in Mosgiel, Dunedin, New Zealand

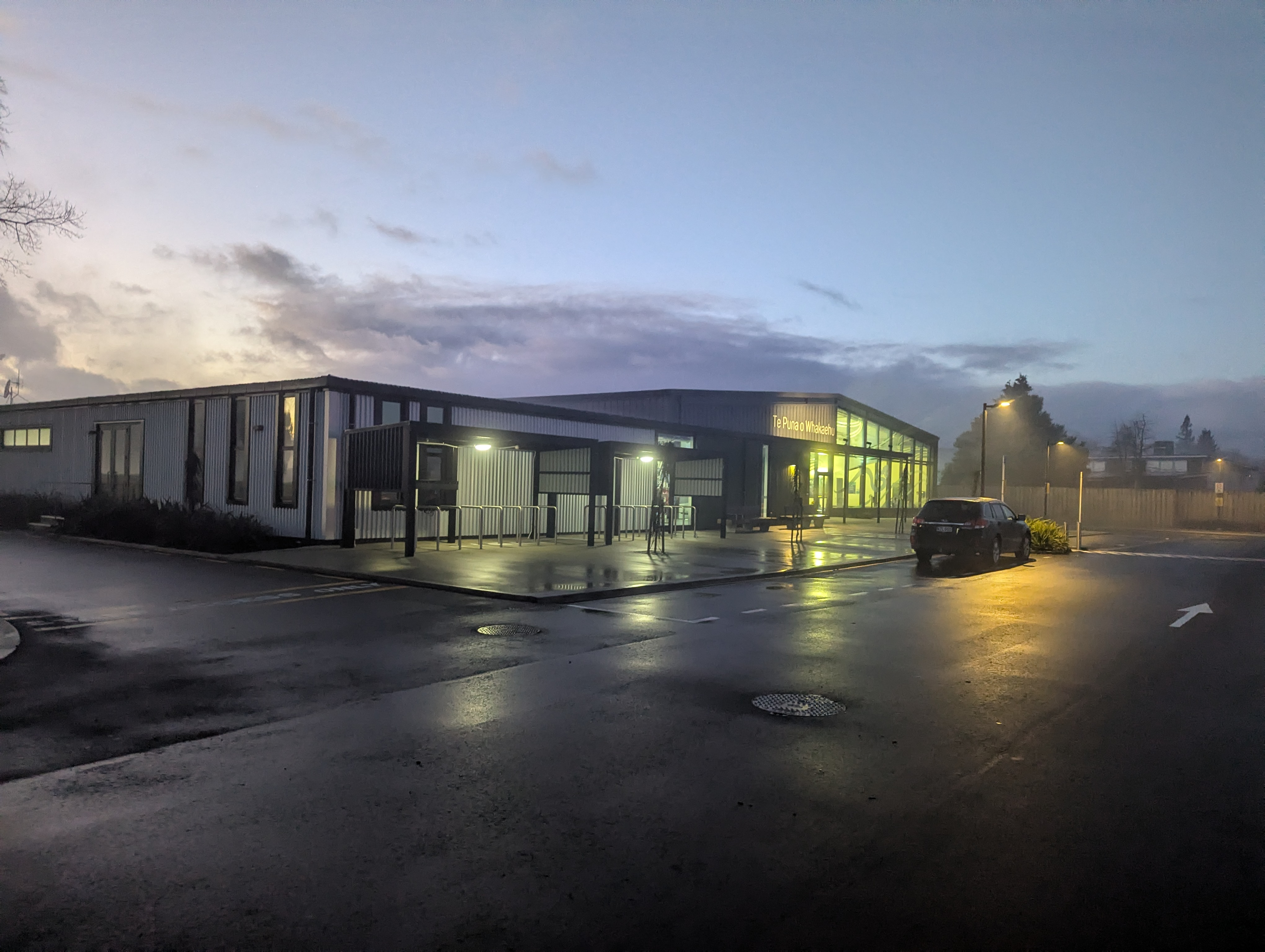
- Te Puna o Whakaehu main entrance
- Interactive map of Te Puna o Whakaehu
- Address: Mosgiel, Dunedin, New Zealand
- Coordinates: 45.86817°S 170.34584°E
- Owner: Dunedin City Council

Construction
- Built: 2022–2023
- Opened: 19 June 2023
- Architects: McCoy Wixon Architects and Maguire and Harford Architects

Te Puna o Whakaehu is a modern indoor aquatic and recreational facility in Mosgiel, Dunedin, New Zealand. The name, which means "the pool of Silver Stream," was gifted by Te Rūnanga o Ōtākou and acknowledges the traditional Kai Tahu connection to the nearby waterway.

== History ==
Swimming has been part of Mosgiel's community life since the late 19th century. Residents petitioned for a bathing pool in the Silverstream as early as 1889.

The Taieri Baths opened in 1937 beside the Silverstream as an outdoor pool. It featured a 25 m, six-lane pool and a toddlers' pool, and was operated in partnership with the Taieri Swimming Club and the Mosgiel Borough Council. The pool was heated in 1967 and later covered in 1984 to allow extended use across colder months, though not fully year-round.

Fundraising for a new, modern facility began in 2015 through the Pooling Together initiative, organised by the Taieri Community Facilities Trust, allowing donors to have their names inscribed on a sponsors' wall. The community raised over NZ$4 million, with the remainder of the NZ$19.2 million project funded by the Dunedin City Council.

Construction of Te Puna o Whakaehu began in 2022, with Cook Brothers Construction leading the design-build project in collaboration with McCoy Wixon Architects and Maguire and Harford Architects. The facility opened to the public on 19 June 2023.

== Facilities ==
Te Puna o Whakaehu contains:

- A 25 m, 8-lane lap pool
- A leisure pool
- A learn-to-swim pool
- A hydrotherapy pool
- A spa pool
- Ramp access and accessible changing facilities
- Administration and amenities building
- Car park and landscaped connections to nearby parks

== Community involvement ==
Local community leaders, including Mosgiel-Taieri Community Board member Brian Miller, participated in the working party overseeing the development of Te Puna o Whakaehu. The project represents a collaboration between the council, the Taieri Community Facilities Trust, local residents, and fundraising donors.

== Awards ==
Te Puna o Whakaehu won the 2024 New Zealand Institute of Architects Southern Architecture Award in the Public Architecture category.
