= Courier Rangers AFC =

New Zealand football club

Courier Rangers
- Full name: Courier Rangers Association Football Club
- Founded: 1959 as Otahuhu Rangers
- Dissolved: 1982
- Ground: Ōtāhuhu, Auckland

Courier Rangers, known prior to 1968 as Otahuhu Rangers, is a former New Zealand football club based in the suburb of Ōtāhuhu, Auckland.

The club was a member of the New Zealand National Soccer League in 1978 and 1979, finishing fifth on their first season, and relegated after finishing 11th out of 12 teams in the second.

Their best performance in the Chatham Cup came in 1977, when they reached the quarter-finals, where they lost to eventual champions Nelson United.

The club disbanded in 1982.

Current team Otahuhu United was formed as a breakaway from Rangers in 1975.
