= Bill McKinlay Park =

Park and football stadium in Auckland, New Zealand

- Interactive map of Bill McKinlay Park
- Former names: Ireland Road Domain (1902–1976)
- Location: 3 Ireland Road, Auckland, New Zealand
- Coordinates: 36.899588°S 174.848903°E
- Owner: Auckland Council
- Operator: Auckland Council
- Capacity: 1,000
- Surface: Artificial Turf
- Field size: 104 by 68 metres (113.7 yd × 74.4 yd)
- Public transit: Panmure

Construction
- Opened: 1902; 124 years ago
- Renovated: 2010–11
- Cost: NZD$500,000 (2010–2011)

Tenants
- Mt Wellington RFC (–1954); Mount Wellington AFC (1952–1999); Uni-Mount Bohemian AFC (2000–present); Eastern Suburbs AFC (2016–2018)

Website
- http://www.billmckinlaypark.co.nz/

Bill McKinlay Park, (formerly Ireland Road Domain) is a multi-purpose stadium in the suburb of Mount Wellington in Auckland, New Zealand. It is used for football matches and is the home stadium of NRF League One side Uni-Mount Bohemian. Eastern Suburbs also used Bill McKinlay Park for their New Zealand Football Championship games between 2016 and 2018.

Bill McKinlay has hosted seven international friendlies and the 1983 Chatham Cup Final Replay.

== History ==
In 1902, Bill McKinlay Park was opened under the control of the Mt Wellington Domain Board. Ireland Road Domain used to host sports days, rodeos and carnivals on their grounds. In 1954 the board made the decision to give exclusive access of the ground to Mount Wellington AFC, meaning Mt Wellington RFC no longer had use of the ground. Between 1961 and 1968, changing rooms, an upstairs lounge and the clubrooms were completed.

In 1976, Bill and Joe McKinlay died suddenly. Mount Wellington AFC asked the Mt Wellington Borough Council to change the name of the ground to its current name, Bill McKinlay Park, in Bill's honour. In 2006, Mt Wellington Stadium Charitable Trust was formed to assess the option of developing Bill McKinlay Park into a multi-use, all-weather stadium. In 2010, a NZD$500,000 facility partnership grant was approved, allowing the Mt Wellington Stadium Charitable Trust to construct an artificial turf. The turf was completed in 2011, installed by Tiger Turf and tested to a FIFA 2* standard.

== International matches ==
Bill McKinlay Park has hosted several international matches, including a Tri-Nations Series between New Zealand, Australia and North Korea. This series was part of the build up to the 2015 FIFA Women's World Cup held in Canada.

In 1982, Bill McKinlay Park also hosted a cross code series of rugby and football where the All Blacks played the All Whites.

20 August 1980 Friendly	New Zealand	4–0	Mexico	Auckland, New Zealand
	B. Turner 4' (pen.), 35'; Wooddin 25'; G. Turner 64'	Report		Stadium: Bill McKinlay Park; Attendance: 5,000; Referee: Bill Munro (New Zealand)

15 April 1985 Friendly	New Zealand B	2–0	1982 All Whites	Auckland, New Zealand
	Sumner (?); Little 64'	Report		Stadium: Bill McKinlay Park; Attendance: 4,500; Referee: Gary Fleet (New Zealand)

7 June 1985 Friendly	New Zealand	2–0	Fiji	Auckland, New Zealand
	Sumner 8' (pen.); Shah 64' (o.g.)	Report		Stadium: Bill McKinlay Park; Attendance: 1,000; Referee: Bill Munro (New Zealand)

7 February 2007 Friendly	New Zealand B	0–0	Tahiti	Auckland, New Zealand
		Report		Stadium: Bill McKinlay Park; Referee: Michael Hester (New Zealand)

20 February 2010 Friendly	New Zealand	0–3	Australia	Auckland, New Zealand
		Report	Garriock 37'; De Vanna 49'; Khamis 84'	Stadium: Bill McKinlay Park

8 February 2015 Tri-Nations	New Zealand Women	1–1	North Korea Women	Auckland, New Zealand
	Wilkinson 11'	Report	Wi Jong-sim 22'	Stadium: Bill McKinlay Park

10 February 2015 Tri-Nations	North Korea Women	1–2	Australia Women	Auckland, New Zealand
	Kim Yun-Mi 14'	Report	Polkinghorne 11'; Heyman 37'	Stadium: Bill McKinlay Park

12 February 2015 Tri-Nations	New Zealand Women	2–3	Australia Women	Auckland, New Zealand
	Gregorius 57', 83'	Report	van Egmond 9'; Heyman 12'; Foord 29'	Stadium: Bill McKinlay Park
