= Peter Henry (captive) =

Peter Henry (1764–1858) and his sister Margaret were survivors of capture by Native Americans in 1779 and were rescued by Captain Samuel Brady at what is now called Brady's Bend, Pennsylvania.

Information from the History of Butler County (1895) provides more detail. When Peter Henry was fourteen years of age, their home, six miles from Greensburg, Pennsylvania, was attacked by a band of Indians, and his mother and the two youngest children were killed. Peter and two younger children were taken prisoners by the savages, but they had proceeded only a short distance when the youngest child began to cry and was immediately tomahawked. The Indians carried Peter and his sister to the point since known as Brady's Bend, where they went into camp. The redoubtable Captain Brady, at the head of a party of scouts, had followed the savages, attacked them in the night while asleep, and only one of the band escaped to tell the tale. Brady took the children to Fort Pitt, and subsequently delivered them safe to their father.

The Bradys Bend Historical Society provides an account from their sources. The Indians had made an inroad into the Sewickly Settlement and in a particular case killed a woman and four of her children and took two children prisoners, their father being absent. The alarm was brought to Pittsburgh, and Colonel Daniel Brodhead sent three of the "brother officers" from Fort Pitt about June 10, 1779, to reconnoiter the Seneca country.

Brady and his party, instead of moving towards Sewickly, as the first detachment had done, painted themselves, donned Indian dress, crossed the Allegheny and advanced up its west side, carefully examining the mouths of all its principal tributaries, especially the eastern ones. On reaching a point opposite the Mahoning Creek, they discovered the Indians' canoes moored at the southwestern bank of the creek. Here just below the "great bend" in the middle of June 1779, Brady was about to experience one of his most notable and successful Indian fights.

With the help of the Delaware Chief Nanowland who was his ally against the Senecas, Captain Brady fell in with seven Indians of this party—that had committed the depredations at Sewickly—about fifteen miles above Kittanning, from the site of Fort Armstrong (Pennsylvania), where the Indians had chosen an advantageous situation for their camp. He surrounded them and attacked at break of day. Subsequently, he killed the Indian captain, who was a notorious warrior of the Munsee nation, and mortally wounded most of them; but they being encamped near a remarkable thicket, and having as customary with them, stopped their wounds just after they received them, could not be found. Captain Brady retook six horses, the two prisoners, the scalps, all their plunder, all the Indians' guns, tomahawks, match-coats, and moccasins.

The two prisoners were Peter and Margaret Henry, ten- and twelve-year-old children of Frederick Henry. They had been captives for about two weeks before they were rescued by Brady's party. Peter Henry settled in Butler County, Pennsylvania. He was a member of Captain Abraham Brinker's company under Colonel John Purviance at Erie, Pennsylvania, in the War of 1812. He was a farmer, raised a large family and was highly respected. He died in his ninety-fourth year in 1858. Margaret Henry married and lived in Westmoreland County, Pennsylvania.
