= Fred de Jong =

New Zealand footballer

Personal information
- Full name: Frederick S. J. de Jong
- Date of birth: 5 April 1964 (age 62)
- Place of birth: Ōtorohanga, New Zealand
- Height: 1.75 m (5 ft 9 in)
- Position: Striker

Senior career*
| Years | Team | Apps | (Gls) |
| 1984–1987 | University-Mount Wellington | | |
| 1988–1990 | Marconi Stallions | 71 | (23) |
| 1990–1993 | Fortuna Sittard | 53 | (6) |
| 1994–1998 | Central United | | |
| 1999–2000 | Football Kingz | 21 | (6) |
| Total | | 148 | (35) |

International career
| 1984–1993 | New Zealand | 21 | (3) |
- * Club domestic league appearances and goals

Frederick S. J. de Jong (born 5 April 1964) is a New Zealand former footballer who played as a striker and represented his country in the 1980s and early 1990s.

== Club career ==
De Jong played senior football with Mt. Wellington before moving to Australia, helping Marconi Stallions to consecutive National Soccer League titles in 1988 and 1989. De Jong then took advantage of his heritage, joining Fortuna Sittard in the Dutch Eredivisie (First Division) in 1990, playing against the likes of Romario and Dennis Bergkamp. De Jong played three seasons in the Dutch top flight (53 games; 6 goals) and one more in the Eerste Divisie (Second Division). He returned to New Zealand after the Dutch 1993–94 season to play domestically for Central United and later played in the Australian National Soccer League for the Football Kingz 1999–2000.

== International career ==
De Jong marked his All Whites debut with a substitute appearance in a 6–1 win over Malaysia on 3 April 1984 and ended his international playing career with 21 A-international caps and 3 goals to his credit, his final cap coming in a 0–1 loss to Australia on 30 May 1993.

== Post-playing career ==
De Jong retains involvement in football serving as a director on the New Zealand Football board and as vice president of the Oceania Football Confederation.

He is an occasional TV commentator for SKY TV in New Zealand and has been a contributor of football related articles for the New Zealand Herald.

== Personal life ==
De Jong was born in New Zealand to Dutch parents. His son Andre represented for the New Zealand U17 team at the 2013 FIFA U-17 World Cup in UAE. Andre played on the team, along with Alex Rufer, son of Shane Rufer and Matt Ridenton, son of former New Zealand All Whites player Michael Ridenton.
