= Tony Sibley =

New Zealand footballer

Personal information
- Full name: Anthony Sibley
- Date of birth: 29 September 1950 (age 76)
- Position: Defender

Senior career*
Years	Team	Apps	(Gls)
1972–1981	Mt Wellington		

International career
1972–1981	New Zealand	48	(0)
Medal record
Men's association football
Representing New Zealand
OFC Nations Cup
Winner	1973 New Zealand
- * Club domestic league appearances and goals

Anthony (Tony) Sibley was a successful New Zealand soccer player who frequently represented his country in the 1970s and 1980s.

He finished his playing career for the All Whites with 48 A-international caps to his credit.

In 1978 Sibley was awarded New Zealand soccer player of the year. Sibley is one of only two players to have appeared in eight Chatham Cup finals.

== Honours ==
New Zealand

- OFC Nations Cup: 1973

Individual

- New Zealand Footballer of the Year: 1978
