= Green Bay-Titirangi United SC =

Green Bay-Titirangi United
- Full name: Green Bay-Titirangi United Sports Club
- Founded: 1973
- Dissolved: 1998

Green Bay-Titirangi United was a football (soccer) club in West Auckland, New Zealand.

They participated in lower divisions of the Northern League between 1978 and 1982 and again between 1988 and 1997, often without much success.

Their most famous player was Danny Hay who played for Leeds United, Walsall and the New Zealand Knights amongst others. Hay also appeared for the New Zealand men's national football team, the All Whites.

Green Bay/Titirangi merged with Blockhouse Bay in 1998, forming a new team, the Bay Olympic.
