= Uni-Mount Bohemian AFC =

Uni-Mount Bohemian
- Full name: Uni-Mount Bohemian Association Football Club
- Nickname: Unimount
- Founded: 1952; 74 years ago (as University-Mount Wellington Association Football Club)
- Ground: Bill McKinlay Park, Panmure, Auckland, New Zealand
- Capacity: 5,000
- Chairman: John Blair (2016)
- Coach: David Hernandez
- League: NRF Division 1
- 2026: NRF Division 1, 3rd of 9
Home colours	Away colours

Uni-Mount Bohemian Association Football Club (formerly known as University-Mount Wellington) is an association football club in Auckland, New Zealand. It was formed from the amalgamation of University AFC and Mount Wellington AFC. The club competes in the NRF Division 1. The team play at Bill McKinlay Park, Panmure, Auckland.

== Club history ==
During much of the 1970s and 1980s, Mt Wellington AFC was a strong club side, rivalled only by Christchurch United. The team won the Chatham Cup on five occasions, in 1973, 1980, 1982, 1983, and 1990. Since amalgamation, the cup has been won a further two times, in 2001 and 2003, making the club one of only two seven-time winners (together with Christchurch United) of the country's main knockout tournament. They also won the country's national league in 1972, 1974, 1980, 1982, and 1986.

== Present day ==
In recent years, the club's senior contingent has been run primarily by Bohemian Celtic FC, formerly of the Auckland Sunday Football Association and 5-time-champions it the ASFA Premier League. Since Unimount & Bohemian Celtic FC aligned, the club has risen from AFF/NFF Conference football back into the NRFL 2nd Division.

Bill McKinlay Park is the clubs home ground and the club has an artificial pitch which can schedule up to five matches in one day.

== Players ==
Many of the country's top players have played for either University-Mount Wellington or its predecessor teams, including several members of New Zealand's first World Cup qualifiers, the 1982 All Whites. These players include Ricki Herbert, Brian Turner, Tony Sibley, Dave Taylor, Darren McClennan, Peter Henry, Jeff Campbell, Rodger Gray, John Houghton, Leigh Kenyon, Michael Ridenton and Fred de Jong.

== Season by season record ==
=== National League ===
Season	Qualifying league	League									National League									Chatham Cup	Top scorer	
Season	Qualifying league	P	W	D	L	F	A	GD	Pts	Pos	P	W	D	L	F	A	GD	Pts	Pos	Chatham Cup	Name	Goals
2021	NRF Championship	—N/a									Not eligible									R1	—N/a	—N/a
2022	NRF Championship	21	5	4	12	32	53	–21	19	7th	Not eligible									PR	Unknown	
2023	NRF League One	15	4	1	10	12	38	–26	13	6th	Not eligible									R1	Unknown	
2024	NRF League One	21	8	2	11	39	51	–12	26	5th	Not eligible									PR	Unknown	
2025	NRF League One	20	0	0	20	7	151	–144	0	8th ↓	Not eligible									PR	Unknown	
2026	NRF Division 1	16	8	3	5	37	25	+12	27	3rd	Not eligible									R2		

== Performance in OFC competitions ==
Season	Competition	Round	Club	Home	Away	Position
1987 (Note: 1987 participation was as Mount Wellington.)	Oceania Club Championship	Final	(Australia) Adelaide City	1–1 (1–4 p)		

== Honours ==
Chart of yearly ladder positions for Mount Wellington in NZ 1st division soccer

=== National ===
- New Zealand National Football League
  - Champions (6): 1972. 1974, 1979, 1980, 1982, 1986
- ASB Charity Cup
  - Champions (3): 1980, 1981, 1983
- Chatham Cup
  - Champions (7): 1973, 1980, 1982, 1983, 1990, 2001, 2003

=== Regional ===
- Northern League
  - Champions (4): 1968, 1969, 1983, 1997

Chatham Cup
Preceded by Christchurch United	Winner*; 1973 Chatham Cup	Succeeded by Christchurch United
Preceded by North Shore United	Winner*; 1980 Chatham Cup	Succeeded by Dunedin City
Preceded by Dunedin City	Winner*; 1982 Chatham Cup	Succeeded by Mount Wellington
Preceded by Mount Wellington	Winner*; 1983 Chatham Cup	Succeeded by Manurewa
Preceded by Christchurch United	Winner*; 1990 Chatham Cup	Succeeded by Christchurch United
Preceded by Napier City Rovers	Winner†; 2001 Chatham Cup	Succeeded by Napier City Rovers
Preceded by Napier City Rovers	Winner†; 2003 Chatham Cup	Succeeded by Miramar Rangers
