= Kapiti Coast United =

Association football club in New Zealand

- Full name: Kapiti Coast United Incorporated Sports Club
- Nickname: KCU
- Founded: 2003 (amalgamation)
- Ground: Weka Park
- Chairman: Adam Pugh
- League: Horowhenua/Kāpiti 1
- 2026: Horowhenua/Kāpiti 1, 4th of 5
- Website: http://www.kcu.co.nz/
Home colours	Away colours

Kapiti Coast United (KCU) is an association football club in New Zealand. The club competes in the Horowhenua/Kāpiti 1. Their home ground is Weka Park in Raumati Beach on the Kāpiti Coast.

== History ==
Originally known as the Raumati Hearts, they formed in 1960 as a junior club then two years later added a senior club. Originally named after Heart of Midlothian, an Edinburgh soccer team commonly known as Hearts. The club changed its name to Kapiti Hearts in 2000 then formed as Kapiti Coast United when they merged with Paraparaumu United in 2003.

Their highest honour is winning Capital One three times in 2006, 2014 and 2017, with their highest placing in the Capital Premier league being 6th which they achieved in 2008 and 2015. They have entered the Chatham Cup most years since 1965 with their best run in 1993 as the Raumati Hearts, where they made the last sixteen, before losing 2–3 to Nelson United.

== Junior Football ==
Kapiti Coast United have a large amount of Junior Football teams which participate in both the Wellington and Kapiti leagues. The club have multiple teams in each grade from 7th Grade (aged 6-7) all the way up until their under-16 program.

== Senior Football ==
Kapiti Coast United have 12 senior teams as of 2019 season with their top men's team playing in the Capital Football Capital One and the women's in the Women's Central League. The other teams participate in either the other local Wellington or Kapiti leagues.

== First team squad ==
As of 4 July 2020

Note: Flags indicate national team as defined under FIFA eligibility rules; some limited exceptions apply. Players may hold more than one non-FIFA nationality.

No.	Pos.	Nation	Player
1	GK	NZL	Michael Newell
2		NZL	Liam Christian
3		NZL	Josh Harmer
5		NZL	Lawrance Gounder
6		GBR	Ben Jones
7		ENG	Phillip King
8		GBR	Graham Sands
9		ENG	Harry Gawtrey

No.	Pos.	Nation	Player
10		NZL	Jack Hibbard
11		ENG	Matthew Jones
12		NZL	Jordan Thomson
13		NZL	Jack Leitch
14		NZL	Cameron Manclarke
15		NZL	Stuart Lawrie
16		FIJ	Kunal Nand
