= Otahuhu United =

Association football club in New Zealand

- Full name: Otahuhu United Association Football Club
- Founded: 1975
- Ground: Seaside Domain, Ōtāhuhu, Auckland
- League: NRF Division 1
- 2026: NRF Division 1, 8th of 9
| Home colours | Away colours |

Otahuhu United is a football club in Auckland, New Zealand. The club competes in the NRF Division 1. Otahuhu United was formed in 1975 as a breakaway side from the Courier Rangers club, formed by parents and junior players unhappy with the organisation of that club. Initially sited at Bert Henham Park, the side were granted the right to play as part of the Auckland Association on the condition that only junior clubs could be fielded for the first three years. The club fielded numerous junior teams, playing in strips modelled on those of English side Norwich City F.C.

In 1990 the club moved to Seaside Park Reserve, the former home of Courier Rangers.
