= Havelock North Wanderers AFC =

Havelock North Wanderers
- Full name: Havelock North Wanderers Association Football Club
- Founded: 1948; 78 years ago (as Hastings Wanderers)
- Ground: Guthrie Park, Havelock North
- League: Eastern Premiership
- 2026: Eastern Premiership, 2nd of 8
- Website: www.hnwafc.org.nz
Home colours	Away colours

Havelock North Wanderers is a soccer club in Havelock North, New Zealand. The club was formed in 1948 as Hastings Wanderers, changing to their current name in 1968. The club competes in the Eastern Premiership.

They won promotion to the New Zealand Football Central League for 2022 after finishing first in the Lotto Central Federation League, then beating Wellington United 6–6 in a home and away playoff by away goals. They had twice before won the Central Federation League in 2017 and 2019, but both times lost their playoff games against Waterside Karori and Petone FC respectively, missing out on promotion.

The Wanderers also regularly compete in the Chatham Cup, New Zealand's premier knockout tournaments for men, with their best finishes being the fifth round in 1982 and 2003 cups before losing to local rivals Napier City Rovers and Lower Hutt.
