= Fencibles United AFC =

Fencibles United
- Full name: Fencibles United AFC
- Nicknames: Fencibles,Fencies
- Founded: 1995; 31 years ago
- Ground: Riverhills Domain; Pakuranga, Auckland, New Zealand
- Chairman: Aaron Carson
- Manager: Rhys Ruka
- League: Northern League
- 2026: Northern League, 5th of 12
Home colours	Away colours

Fencibles United AFC is an amateur association football club who currently compete in the Northern League. The club is based in Howick/Pakuranga, Auckland. The club's roots go back to Pakuranga Town AFC and Howick AFC.

== History ==
In 1995, two East Auckland clubs, Pakuranga Town AFC and Howick AFC, amalgamated to form Fencibles United AFC.

The adoption of 'Fencibles United AFC' as the name for the club, has recognised the Fencibles as the historic link between the two clubs and identifies with the locality. The Fencibles were the first European settlers in the region. The name 'Fencibles' refers to the Royal New Zealand Fencible Corps. 'Fencible' is derived from the word 'Defencible', meaning capable of defence.

The club 'playing strip' of red, blue with white trim also reflects the uniforms of the Royal New Zealand Fencibles Corps. In late 2016, Fencibles FC introduced a new kit by Nike. The new homekit consisted of two red stripes, and one blue stripe running down the centre. It featured a Nike tick, and the Fencibles FC Crest.

The club's best run in the Chatham Cup, New Zealand's national knock-out cup competition, was in the 2026 edition. They defeated Cashmere Technical in the final 2-1 at Christchurch's One New Zealand Stadium. Their previous best performance was in 2003, where they made the last sixteen before losing to Central United in the fifth round.

== Honours ==
- NRFL Championship: 2024
- Chatham Cup: 2026

== Senior women ==
Fencibles United competes in the NRFL Women's Premier League.

== Notable players ==
- (New Zealand) Nik Viljoen
- (New Zealand) Abby Erceg
- (India) Royston D'Souza
- (New Zealand) Nathan Walker
- (New Zealand) Ryan Mackay
