= Island Bay United AFC =

- Full name: Island Bay United Association Football Club
- Nickname: The Sharks
- Founded: 1931, as Wellington Technical College Old Boys
- Ground: Wakefield Park, Wellington
- Chairman: Bruno Bordignon
- Manager: Callum Holmes
- League: Central League
- 2026: Central League, 6th of 10
Home colours	Away colours

Island Bay United is a football club in the southern suburb of Island Bay in Wellington, New Zealand. The club was founded in 1931 as Wellington Technical College Old Boys. In 1966 the name was changed to Island Bay United. Island Bay United currently play in the Central League.

The club also competes in the Chatham Cup, New Zealand's premier knock-out tournaments with their best run being 2003 and 2014 Chatham Cup where they made the quarter-finals.

Notable former players include Liberato Cacace and Mario Barcia.

== Honours ==
- Central League Premier: 1999, 2010
- Central League Division 1: 1995, 1997
- Central League Division 2: 1983
- Central League Division 3: 1998
- Hilton Petone Cup: 1998
- Venus Shield: 1996
- Central League Division 3: Sth 1982
- Wellington Division 2: 1936, 1980
- Wellington Division 3: 1974
- Wellington Division 1B: 1948
