= Napier City Rovers FC =

Napier City Rovers
- Full name: Napier City Rovers
- Nickname: The Blues
- Founded: 1973; 53 years ago
- Ground: Bluewater Stadium, Napier, New Zealand
- Capacity: 4,000 (seated)
- Chairman: Graeme Sole
- Manager: Bill Robertson
- League: National League
- 2026: Central League, 1st of 10; National League, TBD
- Website: www.cityrovers.co.nz

Napier City Rovers is a football team based in Napier, New Zealand, competing in the National League.

== Club history ==
Chart of yearly ladder positions for Napier City Rovers

The team was founded in 1973 by the merger of Napier Rovers and Napier City. Napier City Rovers have won New Zealand's premier knockout football competition (the Chatham Cup) five times, in 1985, 1993, 2000, 2002, and 2019, and won the old New Zealand National Soccer League in 1989, 1993, 1998, and 2000. They represented New Zealand at the Oceania Club Championship in 2001, finishing third. The Hawke's Bay region, of which Napier is a part, was represented by Napier City Soccer in the first year of the Football Championship in 2004.

== Squad ==
Squad for the 2026 Central League and National League Championship Note: Flags indicate national team as defined under FIFA eligibility rules; some limited exceptions apply. Players may hold more than one non-FIFA nationality.

No.	Pos.	Nation	Player
1	GK	NZL	Brooklyn Browne
2	DF	NZL	George Andrew
3	DF	ENG	Liam Schofield
4	DF	NZL	Luca Barclay
5	DF	NZL	Jack Albertini
6	MF	USA	Caleb Greening
7	MF	ENG	Callum Cooke
8	MF	SCO	Ross Willox
9	FW	ENG	Jacob Fenton
10	MF	NZL	Sam Lack
11	FW	NZL	Zakk Counsell
12	FW	NZL	Benjamin Wade

No.	Pos.	Nation	Player
14	FW	NZL	Kody Shaw
15	DF	ENG	James Hoyle (Captain)
16	MF	NZL	Cameron Emerson
17	FW	NZL	Aston Hurd
18	DF	NZL	Caleb Hunt
19	FW	NZL	Benjamin Stanley
21	GK	NZL	Joshua Capstick
23	FW	NZL	Dakota Brady
25	GK	NZL	Liam Doran
27	FW	NIR	Leo Brown
—	DF	NZL	Brett McBride

== Season-by-season record ==
Season	Qualifying league	League									National League									Chatham Cup	Top scorer	
Season	Qualifying league	P	W	D	L	F	A	GD	Pts	Pos	P	W	D	L	F	A	GD	Pts	Pos	Chatham Cup	Name	Goals
2021	Central League	18	5	2	11	37	51	−14	17	7th	Cancelled (Note: 2021 National League season cancelled due to COVID-19 pandemic in Northern regions;. Championship played as South Central Series, with the northern clubs missing in the first edition.)									R3	(England) Kailan Gould	11
2022	Central League	18	8	4	6	35	28	+7	28	4th	9	1	3	5	14	23	−9	6	8th	R4	(England) Jonathan McNamara	9
2023	Central League	18	10	3	5	50	32	+18	33	3rd	9	2	1	6	13	26	−13	7	9th	R4	(England) Deri Corfe	21
2024	Central League	18	13	1	4	53	23	+30	40	3rd	9	5	2	2	21	14	+7	17	4th	QF	(New Zealand) Oscar Faulds	27
2025	Central League	18	8	4	6	45	24	+21	28	5th	Did not qualify									R4	(New Zealand) Sam Lack	11
2026	Central League	18	14	2	2	52	15	+37	44	1st												

Season	League	Div	P	W	D	L	GF	GA	GD	Pts	League Position	Chatham Cup	Top scorer	
Season	League	Div	P	W	D	L	GF	GA	GD	Pts	League Position	Chatham Cup	Name	Goals
2027	National League	1									TBD			

== Honours ==
- New Zealand National Soccer League
  - Champions (4): 1989, 1993, 1998, 2000
- Chatham Cup
  - Champions (5): 1985, 1993, 2000, 2002, 2019
- Central League
  - Champions (4): 2012, 2015, 2018, 2026

Chatham Cup
Preceded by Manurewa	Winner; 1985 Chatham Cup	Succeeded by North Shore United
Preceded by Miramar Rangers	Winner; 1993 Chatham Cup	Succeeded by Waitakere City FC
Preceded by Dunedin Technical	Winner; 2000 Chatham Cup	Succeeded by University-Mount Wellington
Preceded by University-Mount Wellington	Winner; 2002 Chatham Cup	Succeeded by University-Mount Wellington
Preceded by Birkenhead United	Winner; 2019 Chatham Cup	Succeeded by 2020 Competition cancelled due COVID-19; 2021 Cashmere Technical

== Performance in OFC competitions ==
- Oceania Club Championship (1 appearance)

2000–01 – 3rd place

Season	Competition	Round	Club	Home	Away	Position
2001	Oceania Club Championship	Group A	(Papua New Guinea) Unitech	2–0		2nd
2001	Oceania Club Championship	Group A	(Solomon Islands) Laugu United	1–1		2nd
2001	Oceania Club Championship	Group A	(Tonga) Lotoha'apai	9–0		2nd
2001	Oceania Club Championship	Group A	(Fiji) Foodtown Warriors	4–0		2nd
2001	Oceania Club Championship	Group A	(Australia) Wollongong Wolves	0–1		2nd
2001	Oceania Club Championship	Semi-finals	(Vanuatu) Tafea	2–4		
2001	Oceania Club Championship	Third place play-off	(French Polynesia) Vénus	3–2		
