= 2023 NRFL Leagues =

Football championship

NRFL Leagues
- Season: 2023

The 2023 NRFL Leagues was the 59th and 57th seasons respectively of the NRFL Championship and NRFL Conference, football competitions in New Zealand. Established in 1965, currently twelve teams compete in the Championship while 8 teams compete in the Northern and Southern sections of the Conference League.

== Northern League ==
The Northern League sits above the two NRFL Divisions and is also overseen by Northern Region Football, despite being run by New Zealand Football as part of the New Zealand National League.

Twelve teams competed in the league – the top ten teams from the previous season and the two teams promoted from the 2022 NRFL Division 1. The promoted teams are West Coast Rangers and Manurewa. This was both Manurewa's first season in the Northern League. West Coast have returned at the first time of asking after being relegated in 2021. They replaced Waiheke United (one season) and North Shore United (two seasons).

=== Northern League table ===
Pos	Team	Pld	W	D	L	GF	GA	GD	Pts	Qualification
1	Auckland City (C)	22	19	3	0	64	9	+55	60	Winner of Northern League and qualification to National League Championship
2	Eastern Suburbs	22	17	5	0	51	17	+34	56	Qualification to National League Championship
3	Auckland United	22	13	4	5	50	24	+26	43	Qualification to National League Championship
4	Manurewa	22	11	3	8	46	37	+9	36	Qualification to National League Championship
5	Western Springs	22	10	3	9	39	35	+4	33	
6	Hamilton Wanderers	22	8	6	8	39	49	−10	30	
7	West Coast Rangers	22	8	2	12	33	49	−16	26	
8	Birkenhead United	22	7	4	11	46	44	+2	25	
9	Melville United	22	6	5	11	30	47	−17	23	
10	Bay Olympic	22	4	3	15	33	55	−22	15	
11	Takapuna (R)	22	4	3	15	23	50	−27	15	Relegation to NRFL Championship
12	Manukau United (R)	22	3	3	16	26	64	−38	12	Relegation to NRFL Championship

Rules for classification: 1) Points; 2) Goal difference; 3) Goals scored; 4) Goals against; 5) Head to head; 6) Disciplinary record; 7) Coin toss
(C) Champions; (R) Relegated

== Championship ==
NRFL Championship
- Season: 2023
- Dates: 25 March 2023 - 9 September 2023
- Champions: Tauranga City
- Promoted: Tauranga City; East Coast Bays
- Relegated: Waiheke United
- Matches: 132
- Goals: 468 (3.55 per match)
- Top goalscorer: Jonty Bidois (22 goals)
- Best goalkeeper: Louie Caunter; Josh Precious (10 clean sheets)
- Biggest home win: Tauranga City 9–1 Waiheke United (29 April 2023)
- Biggest away win: Metro 0–8 Tauranga City (22 July 2023)
- Highest scoring: Tauranga City 9–1 Waiheke United (29 April 2023)

Each team can field a maximum of five foreign players as well as one additional foreign player who has Oceania Football Confederation nationality. Over the course of the season, each team must also ensure players aged 20 or under account for 7% of available playing minutes.

Following their 7–1 win over Mount Albert-Ponsonby on the final day, Tauranga City were crowned champions. They were promoted alongside East Coast Bays a week earlier.

=== Championship teams ===
Twelve teams competed in the league – eight teams from the previous season, the two teams relegated from the 2022 Northern League and two teams promoted from the 2022 NRFL Division 2. The relegated teams were Waiheke United and North Shore United, while the promoted teams are Hibiscus Coast and Ngaruawahia United. West Coast Rangers were promoted alongside Manurewa, while Albany United and Waitemata were relegated.

Team	Location	Stadium	2022 season
East Coast Bays	Northcross, Auckland	Bay City Park	4th
Ellerslie	Ellerslie, Auckland	Michaels Avenue	7th
Fencibles United	Pakuranga, Auckland	Riverhills Domain	9th
Hibiscus Coast	Stanmore Bay, Auckland	Stanmore Bay Park	1st in Division 2 (promoted)
Metro	Mount Albert, Auckland	Phyllis Street	8th
Mount Albert-Ponsonby	Mount Albert, Auckland	Anderson Park	5th
Ngaruawahia United	Ngāruawāhia	Centennial Park	2nd in Division 2 (promoted)
North Shore United	Devonport, Auckland	Allen Hill Stadium	12th in Northern League (relegated)
Northern Rovers	Glenfield, Auckland	McFetridge Park	6th
Onehunga-Mangere United	Māngere Bridge, Auckland	Māngere Domain	10th
Tauranga City	Mount Maunganui, Tauranga	Links Avenue	3rd
Waiheke United	Waiheke Island, Auckland	Onetangi Sports Park	11th in Northern League (relegated)

=== Championship personnel and kits ===
Team	Manager	Captain	Kit manufacturer	Shirt sponsor
East Coast Bays	(New Zealand) Joe Hall	(New Zealand) Louie Caunter	Lotto Sport Italia	None
Ellerslie	Ben Fletcher	Seb Poelman	Lotto Sport Italia	Trillian Trust
Fencibles United	Marty Rodwell		Nike	New World Howick
Hibiscus Coast	(New Zealand) Ryan Faithfull		Lotto Sport Italia	RNB Transport
Metro	(New Zealand) Scott MacKay			
Mount Albert-Ponsonby	(New Zealand) Darren White	Lewis Black	Lotto Sport Italia	Woodview Construction
Ngaruawahia United	Kyle Park		Joma	None
North Shore United	(New Zealand) Dylan Burns		Nike	Atlas Concrete
Northern Rovers	(New Zealand) Paul Gothard	(New Zealand) Dion Buckingham	Lotto Sport Italia	None
Onehunga-Mangere United	(New Zealand) Tim Ragg		Nike	None
Tauranga City	Barry Gardiner		Adidas	None
Waiheke United	Sam Negash		Nike	Fullers 360

=== Championship table ===
Pos	Team	Pld	W	D	L	GF	GA	GD	Pts	Qualification
1	Tauranga City (C, P)	22	17	2	3	73	20	+53	53	Promotion to Northern League
2	East Coast Bays (P)	22	17	0	5	60	18	+42	51	Promotion to Northern League
3	Ngaruawahia United	22	12	6	4	48	31	+17	42	
4	Mount Albert-Ponsonby	22	13	2	7	47	38	+9	41	
5	Hibiscus Coast	22	11	4	7	31	24	+7	37	
6	North Shore United	22	11	6	5	47	37	+10	39	
7	Ellerslie	22	8	5	9	41	45	−4	29	
8	Fencibles United	22	7	7	8	32	40	−8	28	
9	Northern Rovers	22	6	2	14	23	42	−19	20	
10	Onehunga-Mangere United	22	3	5	14	19	44	−25	14	
11	Metro	22	2	4	16	27	64	−37	10	
12	Waiheke United (R)	22	2	3	17	20	65	−45	9	Relegation to NRFL Northern Conference

Source: Northern Region Football
Rules for classification: 1) Points; 2) Goal difference; 3) Goals scored; 4) Goals against; 5) Head to head; 6) Disciplinary record; 7) Coin toss
(C) Champions; (P) Promoted; (R) Relegated
- Metro won 3–0 against Northern Rovers, but Metro fielded an ineligible player. Result upgraded to a 3–0 win for Northern Rovers.
- Metro drew 1–1 with Onehunga-Mangere United, but Metro fielded an ineligible player. Result upgraded to a 3–0 win for Onehunga-Mangere.

=== Championship results table ===
Home \ Away	ECB	ELL	FEN	HBC	MET	MAP	NGA	NSU	NTR	OHM	TGA	WHU
East Coast Bays	—	5–0	3–1	2–1	4–0	6–0	3–1	0–1	5–0	4–1	1–0	7–0
Ellerslie	0–3	—	3–3	2–0	3–1	4–1	1–2	1–4	3–4	1–1	1–2	2–1
Fencibles United	0–2	1–1	—	1–1	1–3	0–2	1–1	2–2	3–1	2–0	0–2	2–1
Hibiscus Coast	1–3	1–2	1–0	—	3–0	2–1	1–0	1–1	1–0	2–0	0–3	5–0
Metro	2–4	1–1	2–3	2–2	—	1–5	1–2	1–2	0–3 (Note: Metro won 3–0, but Metro fielded an ineligible player. Result upgraded to a 3–0 win for Northern Rovers.)	2–1	0–8	3–3
Mount Albert-Ponsonby	0–1	2–1	2–4	4–0	2–2	—	2–2	3–2	2–0	1–0	2–0	3–0
Ngaruawahia United	2–0	3–2	7–1	2–0	1–0	5–2	—	2–3	3–1	3–3	2–2	4–1
North Shore United	2–0	1–3	2–2	1–1	3–1	0–2	1–1	—	2–1	6–0	2–6	2–1
Northern Rovers	0–2	1–2	0–1	0–4	2–1	0–1	3–0	3–3	—	1–0	1–4	1–0
Onehunga-Mangere United	1–0	2–2	1–3	0–1	3–0 (Note: Metro drew 1–1 with Onehunga-Mangere, but Metro fielded an ineligible player. Result upgraded to a 3–0 win for Onehunga-Mangere.)	1–4	1–2	1–2	1–1	—	0–5	1–0
Tauranga City	3–2	5–3	2–0	0–2	4–2	7–0	1–1	4–0	3–0 (Note: Tauranga City won 3–0 after Northern Rovers defaulted.)	1–0	—	9–1
Waiheke United	2–3	1–3	1–1	0–1	4–2	0–6	1–2	1–5	1–0	1–1	0–2	—

Source: UltimateNZSoccer
Legend: Blue = home team win; Yellow = draw; Red = away team win.

=== Championship scoring ===
==== Championship top scorers ====
Rank	Player	Club	Goals
1	(New Zealand) Jonty Bidois	Tauranga City	22
2	(Croatia) Stjepan Kovacic	Ngaruawahia United	14
3	(New Zealand) Dylan Stansfield	East Coast Bays	12
4	(New Zealand) Reuben Henderson	Ngaruawahia United	11
4	(New Zealand) Gilberto Souza	Metro	11
6	(New Zealand) Colby Brennan	Tauranga City	10
7	(New Zealand) Thomas Page	North Shore United	9
7	(New Zealand) Brennen Priestley	Fencibles United	9
9	(New Zealand) Nick Petherick	North Shore United	8
9	(England) Sam Tutton	Mt Albert Ponsonby	8

== Northern Conference ==
NRFL Northern Conference
- Season: 2023
- Dates: 25 March 2023 - 2 September 2023
- Champions: Franklin United
- Promoted: Franklin United
- Relegated: West Auckland; Central United
- Matches: 72
- Goals: 276 (3.83 per match)
- Biggest home win: Northland 6–0 Central United (26 August 2023)
- Biggest away win: Central United 0–6 Bucklands Beach (20 May 2023)
- Highest scoring: Franklin United 5–5 Beachlands Maraetai (10 June 2023); Albany United 6–4 West Auckland (24 June 2023)

=== Northern Conference teams ===
Nine teams are competing in the league – the top six northern teams from Division 2 last season, the two teams relegated from the 2022 NRFL Division 1 and the champions of the 2022 NRF Championship. The relegated teams are Albany United and Waitemata. Originally, although Central United won the 2022 NRF Championship, they were unable to be promoted due to their MoU with Auckland City. As a result, Oratia United were reprieved of relegation. However, after Central United successfully appealed to the Sports Tribunal of New Zealand, they were entered into the competition three weeks after it commenced. As a result NRF decided the league would restart, voiding all previously played matches.

Team	Location	Stadium	2022 season
Albany United	Albany, Auckland	Rosedale Park	11th in Division 1 (relegated)
Beachlands Maraetai	Beachlands, Auckland	Te Puru Park	7th
Bucklands Beach	Pakuranga Heights	Lloyd Elsmore Park	4th
Central United	Sandringham	Kiwitea Street	1st in NRF Championship (promoted) (Note: Oratia United were reprieved from relegation as Central United were originally unable to gain promotion due to their MoU with Auckland City. After appeal to the Sports Tribunal of New Zealand, Central United were re-entered into the competition.)
Franklin United	Drury	Drury Sports Grounds	5th
Northland	Morningside, Whangārei	Morningside Park	6th
Oratia United	Oratia, Auckland	Parrs Park	10th
Waitemata	Beachlands, Auckland	Te Puru Park	12th in Division 1 (relegated)
West Auckland	Kelston, Auckland	Brains Park	3rd

=== Northern Conference table ===
Table before restart

Pos	Team	Pld	W	D	L	GF	GA	GD	Pts	Qualification
1	Albany United	3	2	1	0	8	3	+5	7	Qualification for Conference play-offs
2	Bucklands Beach	3	2	1	0	6	3	+3	7	
3	West Auckland	3	2	0	1	6	1	+5	6	
4	Franklin United	3	2	0	1	3	2	+1	6	
5	Beachlands Maraetai	3	1	1	1	5	6	−1	4	
6	Waitemata	3	0	2	1	2	5	−3	2	
7	Northland	3	0	1	2	2	5	−3	1	
8	Oratia United	3	0	0	3	1	8	−7	0	Relegation to NRF League One

Updated to match(es) played on 15 April 2023. Source: Northern Region Football
Rules for classification: 1) Points; 2) Goal difference; 3) Goals scored; 4) Goals against; 5) Head to head; 6) Disciplinary record; 7) Coin toss

Pos	Team	Pld	W	D	L	GF	GA	GD	Pts	Qualification
1	Franklin United (C, P)	16	11	5	0	36	18	+18	38	Qualification for Conference play-offs
2	Bucklands Beach	16	9	4	3	38	17	+21	31	
3	Oratia United	16	8	2	6	35	32	+3	26	
4	Waitemata	16	5	6	5	26	26	0	21	
5	Beachlands Maraetai	16	5	4	7	31	37	−6	19	
6	Albany United	16	4	6	6	32	34	−2	18	
7	Northland	16	4	3	9	24	27	−3	15	
8	West Auckland (R)	16	4	3	9	32	43	−11	15	Relegation to NRF League One
9	Central United (R)	16	4	3	9	22	42	−20	15	Relegation to NRF League One

Source: Northern Region Football
Rules for classification: 1) Points; 2) Goal difference; 3) Goals scored; 4) Goals against; 5) Head to head; 6) Disciplinary record; 7) Coin toss
(C) Champions; (P) Promoted; (R) Relegated

=== Northern Conference results table ===
Results before restart

Round 1

- Albany United 3–0 Waitemata
- Bucklands Beach 2–1 Northland
- Franklin United 1–2 Beachlands Maraetai
- Oratia United 0–4 West Auckland

Round 2

- Beachlands Maraetai 2–2 Albany United
- Oratia United 0–1 Franklin United
- Waitemata 1–1 Bucklands Beach
- West Auckland 2–0 Northland

Round 3

- Albany United 3–1 Oratia United
- Bucklands Beach 3–1 Beachlands Maraetai
- Franklin United 1–0 West Auckland
- Northland 1–1 Waitemata

Home \ Away	ALB	BLM	BUC	CEN	FRA	NOR	ORA	WTM	WAK
Albany United	—	2–0	0–5	2–2	2–3	2–1	5–0	1–1	6–4
Beachlands Maraetai	3–2	—	1–1	4–1	0–4	4–0	1–4	1–3	0–2
Bucklands Beach	1–1	4–2	—	6–1	1–1	3–1	1–3	2–2	2–1
Central United	1–1	3–1	0–6	—	0–2	0–3	4–0	1–2	3–0
Franklin United	2–0	5–5	1–0	2–2	—	2–1	4–2	1–0	2–1
Northland	0–0	1–3	0–2	6–0	0–1	—	1–5	2–2	2–2
Oratia United	4–3	2–2	1–0	3–4	1–3	0–1	—	2–0	2–2
Waitemata	2–2	2–2	0–1	2–0	1–1	1–0	1–2	—	4–2
West Auckland	5–3	1–2	2–3	2–0	2–2	0–5	0–4	6–3	—

Source: UltimateNZSoccer
Legend: Blue = home team win; Yellow = draw; Red = away team win.

==== Northern Conference scoring ====
As of 2 September 2023

===== Northern Conference top scorers =====
Rank	Player	Club	Goals
1	Sander Waterland	Bucklands Beach	16
2	Jack Beguely	Albany United	15
3	Aaron Parry	Beachlands Maraetai	12
4	Mohammed Shah	Franklin United	10
5	Tim Richardson	Franklin United	8
5	Haylen West	West Auckland	8
7	Alex Thurbon	Beachlands Maraetai	7
7	Kyle Levell	Northland	7
7	Thomas Jacobson	Oratia United	7
7	Andy Kapetyn	Oratia United	7
7	Mohammed Haj	West Auckland	7
7	Jordan Hearn	West Auckland	7

== Southern Conference ==
NRFL Southern Conference
- Season: 2023
- Dates: 25 March 2023 - 16 September 2023
- Champions: Waikato Unicol
- Matches: 84
- Goals: 368 (4.38 per match)
- Biggest home win: Cambridge 10–1 Te Awamutu (1 July 2023)
- Biggest away win: Te Awamutu 0–7 Taupo (10 June 2023)
- Highest scoring: Cambridge 10–1 Te Awamutu (1 July 2023)

=== Southern Conference teams ===
Eight teams are competing in the league – the top two southern teams from Division 2 last season, and the top 6 from the 2022 WaiBOP Premiership.

Team	Location	Stadium	2022 season
Cambridge	Cambridge	John Kerkhof Park	8th
Claudelands Rovers	Claudelands, Hamilton	Galloway Park	9th
Ngongotahā Lakes	Ngongotahā, Rotorua	Tamarahi Reserve	6th in WaiBOP Premiership (promoted) (Note: Ngongotaha AFC finished 6th last season. They signed a Memorandum of Understanding with Lakes FC at the end of the 2022 season to have a combined team for the 2023 season onwards.)
Otumoetai	Matua, Tauranga	Fergusson Park	2nd in WaiBOP Premiership (promoted)
Papamoa	Papamoa Beach, Papamoa	Gordon Spratt Reserve	4th in WaiBOP Premiership (promoted)
Taupo	Tauhara, Taupō	Crown Park	3rd in WaiBOP Premiership (promoted)
Te Awamutu	Te Awamutu	The Stadium	5th in WaiBOP Premiership (promoted)
Waikato Unicol	Silverdale, Hamilton	Jansen Park	1st in WaiBOP Premiership (promoted)

=== Southern Conference table ===
Pos	Team	Pld	W	D	L	GF	GA	GD	Pts	Qualification
1	Waikato Unicol (C)	21	17	2	2	70	23	+47	53	Qualification for Conference play-offs
2	Cambridge	21	17	1	3	80	32	+48	52	
3	Taupo	21	12	2	7	49	35	+14	38	
4	Claudelands Rovers	21	7	3	11	40	35	+5	24	
5	Papamoa	21	6	4	11	37	60	−23	22	
6	Otumoetai	21	5	4	12	38	47	−9	19	
7	Ngongotahā Lakes	21	4	4	13	29	63	−34	16	
8	Te Awamutu	21	4	4	13	25	73	−48	16	

Source: Northern Region Football
Rules for classification: 1) Points; 2) Goal difference; 3) Goals scored; 4) Goals against; 5) Head to head; 6) Disciplinary record; 7) Coin toss
(C) Champions

=== Southern Conference results table ===
Home \ Away	CAM	CLR	NGO	OTU	PAP	TAU	TAW	WKU	CAM	CLR	NGO	OTU	PAP	TAU	TAW	WKU
Cambridge	—	1–4	6–0	3–2	3–1	3–1	10–1	3–1	—	6–3	—	—	4–0	4–2	—	4–1
Claudelands Rovers	0–2	—	3–1	4–0	1–2	2–1	7–0	1–4	—	—	—	0–0	—	—	4–0	1–3
Ngongotahā Lakes	1–1	2–2	—	1–0	1–2	0–2	2–2	1–2	1–4	1–0	—	—	—	1–6	—	—
Otumoetai	1–5	1–0	1–2	—	2–2	1–1	1–1	1–2	2–3	—	6–1	—	—	7–0	—	—
Papamoa	1–7	2–0	3–3	1–3	—	0–2	2–1	3–3	—	3–3	5–1	3–4	—	—	—	—
Taupo	4–1	2–1	5–3	5–2	5–1	—	3–0	0–4	—	1–0	—	—	1–0	—	0–0	1–3
Te Awamutu	1–2	1–3	2–4	3–2	2–6	0–7	—	1–1	2–7	—	2–1	2–0	3–0	—	—	—
Waikato Unicol	3–1	2–1	4–1	3–0	6–0	2–0	6–1	—	—	—	5–1	5–2	5–0	—	5–0	—

Source: UltimateNZSoccer
Legend: Blue = home team win; Yellow = draw; Red = away team win.

==== Southern Conference scoring ====
As of 16 September 2023

===== Southern Conference top scorers =====
Rank	Player	Club	Goals
1	Joshua Clarkin	Cambridge	31
2	Joe O'Donoghue	Taupo	21
3	Krishaant Singh	Cambridge	19
4	Bailey Webster	Waikato Unicol	16
5	Harry Christensen-Rose	Waikato Unicol	14
5	Dominick Edwards	Waikato Unicol	14
7	Chaz Picton	Otumoetai	11
8	Jack Boland	Otumoetai	10
9	Levi Clark	Waikato Unicol	9
10	Charles Young	Claudelands Rovers	7
10	Andrew Cooper	Papamoa	7
10	Jack Connor	Te Awamutu	7

== Conference play-offs ==
16 September 2023
14:00 NZST

Franklin United	1–0	Waikato Unicol
Sage 63'	Report

Gower Park, Hamilton

== Women's Premiership ==
The NRFL Women's Premiership acts as a qualifier for the New Zealand Women's National League.

Eight teams are competing in the league – the top seven teams from the previous season and the promoted side from the 2022 NRF Championship. The promoted team is Hibiscus Coast as winners of the NRF Championship.

=== Women's Premiership table ===
Pos	Team	Pld	W	D	L	GF	GA	GD	Pts	Qualification
1	Auckland United (C)	14	11	1	2	42	13	+29	34	Winner of Northern League and qualification to National League Championship
2	Eastern Suburbs	14	10	1	3	52	18	+34	31	Qualification to National League Championship
3	Western Springs	14	7	3	4	42	22	+20	24	Qualification to National League Championship
4	Ellerslie	14	7	2	5	23	21	+2	23	Qualification to National League Championship
5	West Coast Rangers	14	7	1	6	28	15	+13	22	
6	Hamilton Wanderers	14	5	1	8	18	34	−16	16	
7	Hibiscus Coast	14	4	1	9	13	36	−23	13	
8	Northern Rovers (R)	14	0	0	14	3	62	−59	0	Relegation to NRFL Women's Championship

Source: Northern Region Football
Rules for classification: 1) Points; 2) Goal difference; 3) Goals scored; 4) Goals against; 5) Head to head; 6) Disciplinary record; 7) Coin toss
(C) Champions; (R) Relegated

== Women's Championship ==
NRFL Women's Championship
- Season: 2023
- Dates: 24 March 2023 – 10 September 2023
- Champions: Fencibles United
- Promoted: Fencibles United
- Relegated: Te Atatu

=== Women's Championship table ===
Pos	Team	Pld	W	D	L	GF	GA	GD	Pts	Qualification
1	Fencibles United (C, P)	21	16	3	2	69	16	+53	51	Promotion to NRFL Women's Premiership
2	Onehunga Sports	21	14	2	5	57	27	+30	44	
3	Franklin United	21	11	6	4	48	25	+23	39	
4	Tauranga City	21	12	3	6	54	34	+20	39	
5	Otumoetai	21	10	2	9	47	47	0	32	
6	Manukau United	21	5	2	14	20	44	−24	17	
7	Central United	21	3	2	16	17	57	−40	11	
8	Te Atatu (R)	21	3	0	18	18	80	−62	9	Relegation to NRF Women's Conference

Source: Northern Region Football
Rules for classification: 1) Points; 2) Goal difference; 3) Goals scored; 4) Goals against; 5) Head to head; 6) Disciplinary record; 7) Coin toss
(C) Champions; (P) Promoted; (R) Relegated
