= WaiBOP Football =

Federation of New Zealand Football

- Founded: 2000
- Headquarters: 51 Akoranga Road, Avalon, Hamilton
- FIFA affiliation: New Zealand Football
- Chief Executive: Karyn Walters
- Website: Official website

WaiBOP Football, also known as Waikato Bay of Plenty Football, is one of six federations of New Zealand Football, representing regions of Bay of Plenty, Rotorua, Taupō, Thames/Coromandel and Waikato.

== History ==
Waikato/B.O.P. was founded in 2002, to represent the region for the New Zealand Women's National League from its inaugural season in 2002 until 2019. In 2021, the Northern franchise teams was replaced for more of a club based competition, causing the WaiBOP United is dissolve.

WaiBOP United was founded in 2004 as a conglomerate of various Waikato area clubs, in order to form a strong regional franchise team, and WaiBOP United was one of the eight competing teams. In 2016, WaiBOP United disbanded at the end of the season.

== Competitions ==
Leagues

- Men's Leagues
  - Northern League
  - NRFL Championship
  - NRFL Conference Southern
  - WaiBOP League One
- Women's Leagues
  - NRFL Women's Premiership
  - NRFL Women's Championship
  - WaiBOP W-League

Note: Northern League and NRF League includes teams from the Northern Region Football Federation, with the Northern League being a National competition run by New Zealand Football and managed by Northern Region Football.

== Current title holders ==
Competition	Year	Champions	Runners-up	Next edition
Senior (Men's)
Northern League	2024	Auckland City	Western Springs	2025
NRFL Championship	2024	Fencibles United	Manukau United	2025
NRFL Conference	2024	Cambridge	Taupo	2025
WaiBOP League One	2024	Otorohanga	Northern United	2025
Senior (Women's)
NRFL Women's Premiership	2024	Auckland United	West Coast Rangers	2025
NRFL Women's Championship	2024	FC Tauranga Moana	Franklin United	2025
WaiBOP W-League	2024	Cambridge	Taupo	2025

== Affiliated clubs ==
As of 2024.

Northern League Tauranga City NRFL Championship Cambridge Hamilton Wanderers Melville United Ngaruawahia United	NRFL Conference Claudelands Rovers Ngongotahā Otorohanga Otumoetai Papamoa Taupo Waikato Unicol	Hamilton Eastern City Glenview United Hamilton Marist Hillcrest United Northern United Western United West Hamilton United	Waikato Huntly Thistle Mangakino United Matamata Swifts Morrnsville Ngahinapouri North King Country Putaruru Rangers Raglan Te Aroha Cobras Te Awautu Tokoroa	Thames Valley Hauraki Plains Mercury Bay Paero Rangers Tairua Thames Waihi Whangamata	Bay of Plenty Awakeri FC Tauranga Moana Katikati Kawerau Ohope Beach Omokora FC Opotiki FC Plains Plains Rangers Tauranga Blue Rovers Te Puke United Waipuna Whakatane Town	Rotorua/Taupo Lakes Waiariki Westbrook

== See also ==
- New Zealand Football
- Northern Region Football
- Central Football
- Capital Football
- Mainland Football
- Southern Football
- Association football in New Zealand
