= 1998 Chatham Cup =

Tournament details
- Venue(s): North Harbour Stadium, North Shore
- Dates: 19 September 1998

Final positions
- Champions: Central United (2nd title)
- Runners-up: Dunedin Technical

Awards
- Jack Batty Memorial Cup: Terry Torrens (Central United)

The 1998 Chatham Cup was the 71st annual nationwide knockout football competition in New Zealand.

Up to the last 16 of the competition, the cup was run in three regions (northern, central, and southern), with an open draw from the quarter-finals on. National League teams received a bye until the third round (last 64). In all, 130 teams took part in the competition. Note: Different sources give different numberings for the rounds of the competition. Some record six rounds prior to the quarter-finals; others note a preliminary round followed by five rounds proper.

In an early round of the competition, Norwest United were thrashed 21–0 by Metro - a competition record which still stands. It was equalled in 2005, when Central United scored 21 - again against the unfortunate Norwest United.

== The 1998 final ==
Central United easily won the 1998 final, beating Dunedin Technical 5–0.

The Jack Batty Memorial Cup is awarded to the player adjudged to have made to most positive impact in the Chatham Cup final. The winner of the 1998 Jack Batty Memorial Cup was Terry Torrens, team captain of Central United.

== Results ==
=== Third round ===
Christchurch Rangers	3 – 0	Christchurch United

Claudelands Rovers	1 – 0	South Auckland Rangers

Dispensary Bar (Auckland)	0 – 3	Bay Olympic (Auckland)

Dunedin Technical	4 – 0	Invercargill Thistle

East Coast Bays	2 – 3	Papatoetoe

Eastern Suburbs (Auckland)	3 – 2	Takapuna City

Ellerslie	3 – 1	Onehunga Sports

Fencibles United (Auckland)	7 – 0	Te Awamutu

Glen Eden	0 – 10	Papakura City

Glenfield Rovers	1 – 0	Mount Wellington

Green Island	3 – 0	Otago University

Halswell United	1 – 2	Christchurch Technical

Hamilton Wanderers	7 – 0	Whakatane Town

Kelston Boys HS (Auckland)	1 – 5	Waitemata City

Lower Hutt City	1 – 2	Tawa

Manukau City	2 – 0	Albany United

Melville United (Hamilton)	2 – 6	West Auckland

Metro (Auckland)	21 – 0	Norwest United (Kumeu)

Mount Albert Grammar	1 – 3	Tauranga City

Mount Albert-Ponsonby	0 – 4	Taupo

Napier City Rovers	6 – 1	New Plymouth Rangers

Ngaruawahia United	3 – 0	Three Kings United (Auckland)

Northland United (Whangarei)	1 – 2	Central United (Auckland)

North Wellington	3 – 0	Palmerston North Marist

Oratia United	2 – 1	Lynn-Avon United (Auckland)

Otahuhu United	5 – 2	Birkenhead United

Raumati Hearts	0 – 2	Wanganui East Athletic

University (Auckland)	7 – 0	Manurewa

Waterside Karori	0 – 1	Red Sox Riverside (Palmerston N.)

Wellington College	4 – 0	Seatoun

Wellington Olympic	3 – 1	Wainuiomata

Western Suburbs FC (Porirua)	5 – 1	Upper Hutt City

=== Fourth round ===
Bay Olympic	1 – 0	Papatoetoe

Central United	6 – 2	Papakura City

Christchurch Technical	2 – 1	Green Island

Dunedin Technical	3 – 2	Christchurch Rangers

Fencibles United	0 – 2	Hamilton Wanderers

Metro	4 – 2	Taupo

Napier City Rovers	0 – 2	Western Suburbs FC

Ngaruawahia United	0 – 0 (aet)*	Eastern Suburbs

North Wellington	3 – 2	Wanganui East Athletic

Oratia United	2 – 0	Claudelands Rovers

Otahuhu United	0 – 4	Glenfield Rovers

Red Sox Riverside	0 – 3	Tawa

University	1 – 3	Ellerslie

Waitemata City	0 – 3	Tauranga City

Wellington Olympic	2 – 0	Wellington College

West Auckland	5 – 0	Manukau City

* Won on penalties by Ngaruawahia United (6–5)

=== Fifth round ===
20 June

Dunedin Technical	2 – 0	Christchurch Technical

20 June

Glenfield Rovers	2 – 3	Bay Olympic

20 June

Metro	1 – 0	West Auckland

20 June

Ngaruawahia United	1 – 0	Hamilton Wanderers

20 June

Oratia United	0 – 5	Ellerslie

20 June

Tauranga City	1 – 2	Central United

20 June

Tawa	2 – 1	North Wellington

20 June

Western Suburbs FC	3 – 2	Wellington Olympic

=== Quarter-finals ===
July

Central United	2 – 1	Western Suburbs FC

July

Metro	3 – 1	Ellerslie

July

Ngaruawahia United	2 – 1	Bay Olympic

July

Tawa	0 – 5	Dunedin Technical

=== Semi-finals ===
16 August

Central United	3 – 1	Metro

16 August

Dunedin Technical	2 – 0	Ngaruawahia United

=== Final ===
19 September

Central United	5 – 0	Dunedin Technical
Hickey 2, P. Urlovic 2, M. Urlovic

North Harbour Stadium, North Shore
Referee: B. Grimshaw
