= 2021 Kate Sheppard Cup =

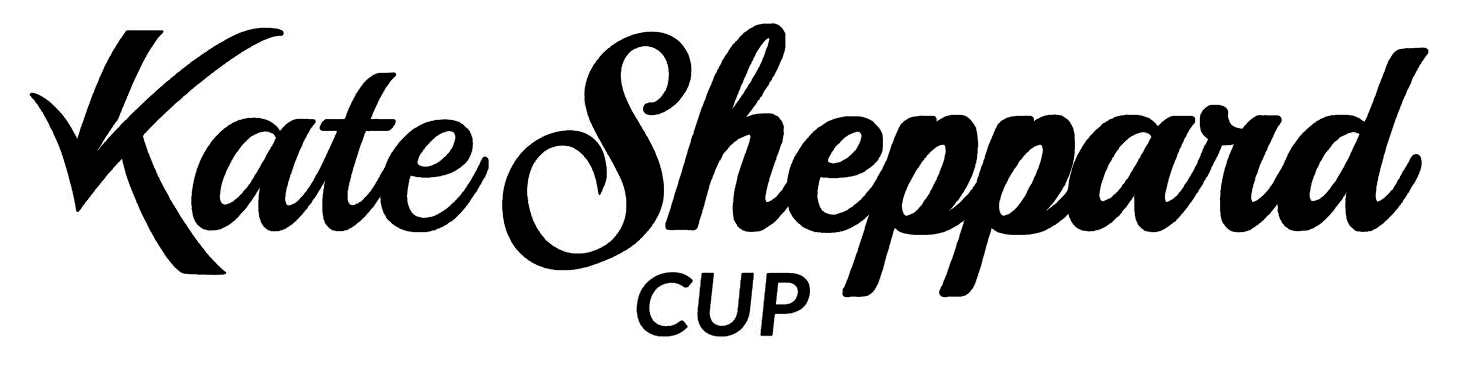

Tournament details
- Country: New Zealand
- Venue(s): QBE Stadium, Auckland
- Dates: 24 April 2021 – 27 March 2022
- Teams: 57

Final positions
- Champions: Wellington United
- Runners-up: Hamilton Wanderers

Tournament statistics
- Matches played: 55
- Goals scored: 326 (5.93 per match)
- Top goal scorer(s): Britney-lee Nicholson (8 goals)

Awards
- Maia Jackman Trophy: Lily Jervis

The 2021 Kate Sheppard Cup is New Zealand's women's 27th annual knockout football competition after the competition was cancelled, for the first time in its history, last season due to COVID-19. This is the fourth year that the competition is known by the Kate Sheppard Cup, or New Zealand Football Foundation Kate Sheppard Cup for sponsorship purposes, after previously been known as the Women's Knockout Cup since its establishment. The cup has had twelve different winners lift the trophy over its 27-year history with Lynn-Avon United from Auckland being the most successful and Eastern Suburbs being the current holders from the 2019 season.

The 2021 competition has four rounds before quarter-finals, semi-finals, and a final. Competition will run in four regions (northern, central/capital, mainland, southern) until the quarter-finals, from which stage the draw will be open. In all, a record 57 teams entered the competition this year which means the cup had a preliminary round added.

== Results ==
=== Preliminary round ===
All matches were played over the Anzac weekend of 23–26 April 2021. A full list of results are as follows:

Northern Region

24 April 2021	Huntly Thistle	3–0	Waiuku AFC	Huntly Domain, Huntly
10:00	Dunsmuir 3', 72'; Russell 72'	Report		Referee: Peter Caffell

25 April 2021	Onehunga-Mangere United	3–0	West Hamilton United FC	Mangere Domain, Māngere Bridge
14:00	Loader 20'; Withers 70', 85'	Report		Referee: Graham Harford

25 April 2021	Franklin United	5–0	Puhoi	Drury Sports Complex, Drury
14:00	Drodrolagi 7', 72'; Jensen 15'; Frank 82'	Report		Referee: Wayne Barry

26 April 2021	Takapuna	4–1	Beachlands Maraetai	Taharoto Park, Takapuna
13:00	Boden 4', 17'; Hallford 16', 53'	Report	Dick 64'	Referee: Paul Whitehead

Mainland Region

23 April 2021	Ferrymead Bays	3–0	Nomads United	Ferrymead Park, Christchurch
19:00	Anderson 32'; Dyer 82'; Summerlee 88'	Report		Referee: Roelof Boiten

24 April 2021	Coastal Spirit	1–0	Waimakariri United	English Park, Christchurch
12:30	Cameron 70'	Report		Referee: Darryl Brown

24 April 2021	Universities	5–0	Halswell United	Ilam Fields, Christchurch
12:30	Roxburgh 38', 55'; Morrow 47', 76', 78'	Report		Referee: Alex Manton

All teams listed below received byes to the first round.
Northern Region: Auckland United FC, Bucklands Beach AFC, Central United FC, Eastern Suburbs AFC, Ellerslie AFC, Onehunga Sports FC, Papakura City FC, Western Springs AFC, Birkenhead United AFC, Hibiscus Coast AFC, Northern Rovers FC, Northland United, West Auckland, West Coast Rangers FC, Claudelands Rovers SC, Hamilton Wanderers, Melville United AFC, Papamoa FC, Rotorua Utd AFC, Waikato Unicol AFC
Central/Capital Region: Palmerston North Marist FC, Massey University, New Plymouth Rangers AFC, Brooklyn Northern Utd AFC, Kapiti Coast Utd, Petone FC, Seatoun AFC, Upper Hutt City Football, Victoria University, Wairarapa United, Waterside Karori, Wellington United
Mainland Region: Cashmere Technical
Southern Region: Southland United FC, Queenstown AFC, Dunedin Technical AFC, Green Island AfC, Mosgiel AFC, Otago University AFC, Roslyn Wakari AFC

=== Round 1 ===
All matches were played over the weekend of 15–16 May 2021. A full list of results are as follows:

Northern Region

16 May 2021	West Coast Rangers	2–0	Hibiscus Coast	Huapai Domain, Kumeū
13:00		Report

16 May 2021	Takapuna	0–2	Birkenhead United	Taharoto Park, Takapuna
13:00		Report

16 May 2021	Onehunga Sports	3–2	Claudelands Rovers	Waikaraka Park, Auckland
13:00		Report

16 May 2021	Papamoa	3–0	Central United	Gordon Spratt Reserve, Tauranga
13:00		Report

16 May 2021	Franklin United	5–5 (a.e.t.) (3–2 p)	West Auckland Kiwi True Blues	Drury Sportsgrounds, Drury
13:00		Report

16 May 2021	Bucklands Beach	1–0	Melville United	Lloyd Elsmore Park, Pakuranga Heights
13:00		Report

16 May 2021	Huntly Thistle	0–8	Rotorua United	Huntly Domain, Huntly
13:00		Report

16 May 2021	Northland FC	2–2 (a.e.t.) (4–3 p)	Onehunga-Mangere United	Trigg Arena, Whangārei
14:00		Report

Central/Capital Region

15 May 2021	Wellington United	8–0	Kapiti Coast United	Newtown Park, Wellington
11:30		Report

15 May 2021	Seatoun	4–5 (a.e.t.)	Upper Hutt City	Seatoun Park, Wellington
12:00		Report

16 May 2021	New Plymouth Rangers	8–0	Massey University	Merrilands Domain, New Plymouth
12:30		Report

16 May 2021	Brooklyn Northern United	0–5	Petone	Wakefield Park, Wellington
13:00		Report

Mainland Region

15 May 2021	Cashmere Technical	3–2	Ferrymead Bays	Garrick Memorial Park, Christchurch
12:30		Report

15 May 2021	Universities	1–8	Coastal Spirit	Ilam Field, Christchurch
12:30		Report

15 May 2021	Blenheim Valley Sports	4–2	Nelson Suburbs	A & P Park, Blenheim
13:00		Report

Southern Region

15 May 2021	Dunedin Technical	9–0	Roslyn-Wakari	Culling Park, Dunedin
11:00		Report

16 May 2021	Otago University	7–0	Southland United	Caledonian Ground, Dunedin
13:00		Report

16 May 2021	Queenstown AFC	1–3	Green Island	Queenstown Events Centre, Queenstown
14:00		Report

All teams listed below received byes to the second round.
Northern Region: Waikato Unicol, Papakura City, Northern Rovers, Hamilton Wanderers, Western Springs, Ellerslie, Eastern Suburbs, Auckland United.
Central/Capital Region: Palmerston North Marist, Victoria University of Wellington, Wairarapa United, Waterside Karori.
Mainland Region: Richmond Athletic.
Southern Region: Mosgiel.

=== Round 2 ===
All matches were played on Queen's Birthday weekend 5–7 June 2021. A full list of results are as follows:

Northern Region

4 June 2021	Western Springs	12–0	Birkenhead United	Seddon Fields, Auckland
19:00		Report

5 June 2021	Onehunga Sports	1–9	Northern Rovers	Waikaraka Park, Auckland
11:00		Report

5 June 2021	Bucklands Beach	1–9	Hamilton Wanderers	Lloyd Elsmore Park, Pakuranga Heights
13:00		Report

6 June 2021	Papamoa	0–9	Auckland United	Gordon Spratt Reserve, Tauranga
13:00		Report

6 June 2021	Northland FC	0–4	Eastern Suburbs	Trigg Arena, Whangārei
13:00		Report

6 June 2021	Ellerslie	6–0	Waikato Unicol	Michaels Avenue Reserve, Ellerslie
14:00		Report

6 June 2021	West Coast Rangers	3–3 (a.e.t.) (2–3 p)	Papakura City	Huapai Domain, Kumeū
14:00		Report

6 June 2021	Rotorua United	0–2	Franklin United	Neil Hunt Park, Rotorua
14:00		Report

Central/Capital Region

5 June 2021	Wellington United	3–2 (a.e.t.)	Waterside Karori	Newtown Park, Wellington
11:00		Report

5 June 2021	Victoria University	1–1 (a.e.t.) (4–1 p)	Petone	Boyd Wilson Turf, Wellington
11:00		Report

5 June 2021	Wairarapa United	14–0	New Plymouth Rangers	Memorial Park, Masterton
12:30		Report

5 June 2021	Palmerston North Marist	20–0	Upper Hutt City	Skoglund Park, Palmerston North
12:30		Report

Mainland Region

5 June 2021	Blenheim Valley Sports	1–2	Richmond Athletic	A & P Park, Blenheim
13:00		Report

7 June 2021	Cashmere Technical	1–4	Coastal Spirit	Garrick Memorial Park, Christchurch
11:30		Report

Southern Region

6 June 2021	Mosgiel	0–8	Otago University	Memorial Park, Mosgiel
13:00		Report

6 June 2021	Green Island	2–3	Dunedin Technical	Sunnyvale Park, Dunedin
13:00		Report

=== Round 3 ===
All matches were played on the weekend 18–20 June 2021 except for the game between Western Springs and Northern Rovers which was postponed due to floodlights going off before the game ended.

Northern Region

19 June 2021	Hamilton Wanderers	4–1	Auckland United	Porritt Stadium, Hamilton
12:30	Arjomandi 34', 86', 89'; Trebes 39'	Report	Philpot 55'	Referee: Nadia Browning

20 June 2021	Eastern Suburbs	2–1	Papakura City	Madills Farm, Auckland
13:00	O'Reilly 77'; Jale 90'	Report	David 60'	Referee: Alex Couchman

20 June 2021	Franklin United	0–7	Ellerslie	Drury Sportsgrounds, Drury
14:00		Report	Pakieto 9', 34', 37'; Aitken 41' (pen.); Leona 46'; Green 76'; Mesias 89'	Referee: Aaron Day

11 July 2021	Western Springs	3–0	Northern Rovers	Seddon Fields, Auckland
14:00	Pedersen 13'; Jacob 78', 88'	Report		Referee: Samuel Clement
Note: First match up, the game was postponed after floodlights went out before the end of the game. Game was then replayed when other quarterfinal games were played

Central/Capital Region

19 June 2021	Palmerston North Marist	3–4 (a.e.t.)	Wellington United	Memorial Park, Palmerston North
11:00	Lancaster 47'; Noakes 87'; Falloon 100'	Report	Robertson 38', 56' (pen.); Olliver-Bell 93'; Alder 116'	Referee: Jason Marshall

19 June 2021	Wairarapa United	9–1	Victoria University	Memorial Park, Masterton
13:00	Dugan 5', 23', 38'; Megchelse 20'; Lyne-Lewis 45', 76'; Whyte 47', 59'; Bryant 87'	Report	Flavell 85'	Referee: Stephen Sale

Mainland

20 June 2021	Richmond Athletic	0–9	Coastal Spirit	Jubilee Park, Richmond
11:00		Report	Dabner 21', 47'; Lake 43', 85'; Nicholson 51', 78', 81'; Hepburn 57'; Cameron 87'	Referee: Andrey Valenga Guimaraes

Southern Region

18 June 2021	Dunedin Technical	6–0	Otago University	Culling Park, Dunedin
19:00	Collin 16', 40'; Whittaker 38' (pen.), 89'; Morison 72'; Anderson 90'	Report		Referee: Allys Clipsham

=== Quarter-finals ===
Three of the matches were played on the weekend 10–11 July 2021.

Northern Region

5 August 2021	Western Springs	0–2	Eastern Suburbs	Seddon Fields, Auckland
18:45		Report	Jale 66'; Findlay 72'	Referee: Beth Rattray

10 July 2021	Hamilton Wanderers	3–1	Ellerslie	Porritt Stadium, Hamilton
11:00	Carpenter 8'; Muspratt 17'; Ollington 31'	Report	Cunningham-Lee 14'	Referee: Andres Castro

Central/Capital Region

10 July 2021	Wellington United	5–1	Wairarapa United	Newtown Park, Wellington
11:30	Woodhead 24' (o.g.); Blackham 30'; Olliver-Bell 31'; Main 48'; Robertson 77'	Report	Lyne-Lewis 60'	Referee: Conor Healy

Mainland/Southern Region

10 July 2021	Dunedin Technical	0–8	Coastal Spirit	Culling Park, Dunedin
13:00		Report	Nicholson 3', 25', 68', 72'; Lake 25', 32'; Keogan 77'; McMeeken 90'	Referee: Lindsey Robinson

=== Semi-finals ===
Matches were meant to be played on the weekend 21–22 August 2021 however due to a COVID-19 outbreak and the country going into lockdown, the games were postponed.

19 February 2022	Coastal Spirit	1–3	Hamilton Wanderers	English Park, Christchurch
16:00	Bercelli 87'	Report	Ollington 13'; Fullerton 17'; Foyle 69' (o.g.)	Referee: Ralph Clink

5 March 2022	Wellington United	1–0	Eastern Suburbs	Newtown Park, Wellington
14:00	Olliver-Bell 68'	Report

=== Final ===
The final was to be played on the 8 September 2021 but due to delay of the semi-final games, it was pushed back to the 27 March 2022.

27 March 2022	Hamilton Wanderers	0–1	Wellington United	North Harbour Stadium, North Shore
14:30		Report	Alder 56'	Referee: Lindsey Robinson
