= 2005 Chatham Cup =

Tournament details
- Venue(s): North Harbour Stadium, North Shore
- Dates: 5 September 2005

Final positions
- Champions: Central United (3rd title)
- Runners-up: Palmerston North Marist

Awards
- Jack Batty Memorial Cup: Ross Nicholson (Central United)

The 2005 Chatham Cup was the 78th annual nationwide knockout football competition in New Zealand.

Up to the last 16 of the competition, the cup was run in three regions (northern, central, and southern), with an open draw from the quarter-finals on. In all, 129 teams took part in the competition. The numbering of rounds in the competition is unclear — some sources record one preliminary round and four full rounds, followed by quarter-finals, semi-finals, and a final; other sources record five rounds. The latter numbering is used in this article.

The scoring record for any Chatham Cup match was equalled in the second round, with Central United demolishing Norwest United 21–0. This tied the previous record set in 1998, when Metro also put 21 goals past the hapless Norwest United.

== The 2005 final ==
The Jack Batty Memorial Cup is awarded to the player adjudged to have made to most positive impact in the Chatham Cup final. The winner of the 2005 Jack Batty Memorial Cup was Central United captain and goalkeeper Ross Nicholson.

== Results ==
=== Third Round ===
| Albany United | 3 – 1 | Auckland Grammar |

| Cambridge | 1 – 2 | Whakatane Town |

| Caversham | 9 – 0 | Grants Braes |

| Central United (Auckland) | 6 – 0 | Oratia United |

| Christchurch Rangers | 2 – 2* | Halswell United |

| East Coast Bays | 3 – 1 | Takapuna |

| Eastern Suburbs (Auckland) | 3 – 0 | Mangere United |

| Fencibles United (Auckland) | 0 – 6 | Papakura |

| Forrest Hill-Milford United | 1 – 9 | North Shore United |

| Gisborne City | 3 – 0 | Taradale |

| Hamilton Wanderers | 6 – 1 | Hamilton North |

| Lower Hutt City | 2 – 0 | Island Bay United |

| Manurewa | 0 – 1 | Onehunga Sports |

| Melville United | 1 – 2 | Glenfield Rovers |

| Mosgiel | 2 – 0 | Northern (Dunedin) |

| Mount Albert Grammar | 1 – 2 | University-Mount Wellington |

| Napier City Rovers | 6 – 2 | Wairarapa United (Masterton) |

| Ngaruawahia United | 6 – 1 | Matamata Swifts |

| Nomads United (Christchurch) | 3 – 1 | Christchurch Technical |

| North Wellington | 3 – 2 | Miramar Rangers |

| Palmerston North Marist | 5 – 0 | Wanganui City |

| Roslyn-Wakari | 9 – 0 | Waihopai (Invercargill) |

| Seatoun | 0 – 2 | Upper Hutt City |

| Stokes Valley | 1 – 4 | Naenae |

| Tauranga City United | 11 – 0 | Taupo |

| Three Kings United (Auckland) | 5 – 2 | South Auckland Rangers |

| Waitakere City | 4 – 0 | Ellerslie |

| Wanganui East Athletic | 3 – 1 | Peringa United (New Plymouth) |

| Wellington Olympic | 4 – 2 | Wellington United |

| Western Springs | 0 – 3 | Bay Olympic (Auckland) |

| Western Suburbs (Porirua) | 3 – 0† | Petone |

| Woolston WMC | 0 – 6 | Western (Christchurch) |

* Won on penalties by Halswell (3–1)
† Western Suburbs fielded an ineligible player; result changed to 2–0 win to Petone

=== Fourth Round ===
| Bay Olympic | 2 – 0 | Glenfield Rovers |

| Caversham | 2 – 4 | Roslyn-Wakari |

| East Coast Bays | 3 – 0 | Three Kings United |

| Eastern Suburbs | 3 – 0 | Onehunga Sports |

| Napier City Rovers | 1 – 3 | Gisborne City |

| Ngaruawahia United | 1 – 3 | Tauranga City United |

| Nomads United | 1 – 3 | Halswell United |

| North Shore United | 3 – 1 | Albany United |

| North Wellington | 0 – 1 | Naenae |

| Palmerston North Marist | 7 – 0 | Wanganui East Athletic |

| Petone | 0 – 5 | Wellington Olympic |

| University-Mount Wellington | 1 – 5 | Papakura |

| Upper Hutt City | 1 – 3 | Lower Hutt City |

| Waitakere City | 1 – 2 | Central United |

| Western | 0 – 1 | Mosgiel |

| Whakatane Town | 2 – 6 | Hamilton Wanderers |

=== Fifth Round ===
2 July

| Central United | 4 – 2 | Hamilton Wanderers |
|---|---|---|
| Young 2 (1 pen.), o.g., Uhlmann | | Cossey, Thompson |

3 July

| Gisborne City | 1 – 5 | Lower Hutt City |
|---|---|---|
| Eeson (pen.) | | Garcias ×2, Richmond, Madden, Patterson |

3 July

| North Shore United | 2 – 3 | East Coast Bays |
|---|---|---|
| Cunneen, Scott (pen.) | | Edginton, Suri, Beldham (pen.) |

3 July

| Palmerston North Marist | 2 – 0 | Naenae |
|---|---|---|
| Halstead ×2 |

3 July

| Papakura | 2 – 1 | Bay Olympic |
|---|---|---|
| Irvine, Hawke | | Gage |

3 July

| Roslyn-Wakari | 3 – 4 (aet) | Halswell United |
|---|---|---|
| Dalman, Letts, Scoullar | | Sands ×2, Neame, Deaker |

2 July

| Tauranga City United | 1 – 1 (aet)* | Eastern Suburbs |
|---|---|---|
| Boyle | | Palmer |

3 July

| Wellington Olympic | 5 – 2 | Mosgiel |
|---|---|---|
| Little ×2, Cheriton, Cripps, Waylan | | Abbott, Stevens (pen.) |

* Eastern Suburbs won 5–4 on penalties.

=== Quarter-finals ===
24 July

| East Coast Bays | 1 – 2 | Central United |
|---|---|---|
| Jones | | Urlovic, del Monte |

23 July

| Eastern Suburbs | 1 – 4 | Wellington Olympic |
|---|---|---|
| Palmer | | Little 2 (1 pen.), Brown, Curtis |

24 July

| Halswell United | 2 – 1 | Papakura |
|---|---|---|
| Sands, Grosvenor | | Godden |

24 July

| Palmerston North Marist | 2 – 1 | Lower Hutt City |
|---|---|---|
| Halstead, Silver | | Garcias (pen.) |

=== Semi-finals ===
14 August

| Halswell United | 1 – 3 | Central United |
|---|---|---|
| Grosvenor (pen.) | | Urlovic, McCormack, del Monte |

14 August

| Wellington Olympic | 1 – 2 (aet) | Palmerston North Marist |
|---|---|---|
| Barbarouses | | Halstead, Hill |

=== Final ===
5 September

| Central United | 2 – 1 | Palmerston North Marist |
|---|---|---|
| Urlovic, Sykes | report | Hill |

North Harbour Stadium, North Shore
Referee: N. Fox
