= NRFL Conference =

- Founded: 1965
- Country: New Zealand
- Confederation: OFC (Oceania)
- Number of clubs: 17
- Level on pyramid: 4
- Promotion to: NRFL Championship
- Relegation to: NRF League One; WaiBOP League One
- Current champions: Northern: Bucklands Beach (1st title); Southern: Ngaruawahia United (1st title) (2026)
- Most championships: Tauranga City (Note: Second and third titles under the name Tauranga City United), Western Springs (3 titles)
- Website: Northern Region Football
- Current: 2026 NRFL Conference

The Northern Regional Football League Conference, currently known as Lotto Sport Italia NRFL Conference for sponsorship reasons, is a New Zealand football league. The league is run by the Auckland Football Federation and includes clubs located in the northern part of the North Island. It is open to clubs from the Northland, Auckland, Waikato and Bay of Plenty provinces. Up until 2022, the competition was known as NRFL Division 2. The fixtures are generally played from April to September. Clubs are able to win promotion to NRFL Championship.

== Current Northern League structure ==
- Northern League
- NRFL Championship
- NRFL Conference (this page)
- NRF League One, WaiBOP League One

== Current clubs ==
Location of clubs in New Zealand for the 2026 NRFL Conference season
NRFL Northern Conference
NRFL Southern Conference

=== Northern Conference ===
Location of clubs in Auckland Region for the 2026 NRFL Northern Conference season

As of the 2026 season.

| Team | Location | Stadium | 2025 season |
|---|---|---|---|
| Albany United | Albany, Auckland | Rosedale Park | 6th |
| Beachlands Maraetai | Beachlands, Auckland | Te Puru Park | 7th |
| Bucklands Beach | Bucklands Beach | Lloyd Elsmore Park | 3rd |
| Central United | Sandringham | Kiwitea Street | 2nd |
| Metro | Mount Albert, Auckland | Phyllis Street | 5th |
| Northland | Morningside, Whangārei | Morningside Park | 1st |
| Te Atatu | Te Atatū Peninsula, Auckland | Te Atatū Peninsula Park | 1st in NRF League One (promoted) |
| Waitemata | Te Atatū South, Auckland | McLeod Park | 4th |

=== Southern Conference ===
As of the 2026 season.

| Team | Location | Stadium | 2025 season |
|---|---|---|---|
| Claudelands Rovers | Claudelands, Hamilton | Galloway Park | 4th |
| Matamata Swifts | Matamata | Matamata Domain | 6th |
| Ngaruawahia United | Ngāruawāhia | Centennial Park, Ngāruawāhia | 12th in Championship (relegated) |
| Ngongotahā Lakes (Note: Ngongotaha AFC signed a Memorandum of Understanding with Lakes FC at the end of the 2022 season to have a combined team for the 2023 season onwards.) | Ngongotahā, Rotorua | Tamarahi Reserve | 7th |
| Northern United | Rototuna North, Hamilton | Korikori Park | 2nd |
| Otumoetai | Matua, Tauranga | Fergusson Park | 3rd |
| Papamoa | Papamoa Beach, Papamoa | Gordon Spratt Reserve | 5th |
| West Hamilton United | Melville, Hamilton | Mahoe Park | 8th |

== Past champions ==
- 1965 – Lynndale
- 1966 – Kahukura
- 1967 – Ellerslie
- 1968 – Huntly Thistle
- 1969 – Takapuna City
- 1970 – Massey Rovers
- 1971 – Metro College
- 1972 – Papakura City
- 1973 – Manurewa
- 1974 – Whangarei City
- 1975 – Lynndale
- 1976 – Glenfield Rovers
- 1977 – Ellerslie
- 1978 – East Coast Bays
- 1979 – Waitemata City
- 1980 – Birkenhead United
- 1981 – Eden
- 1982 – University
- 1983 – Otara Rangers
- 1984 – Mount Manganui
- 1985 – Claudelands Rovers
- 1986 – Rotorua Suburbs
- 1987 – Glenfield Rovers
- 1988 – Onehunga Sports
- 1989 – Kawerau Town
- 1990 – Eden
- 1991 – Hamilton Wanderers
- 1992 – Onehunga Sports
- 1993 – Cambridge
- 1994 – Western Springs
- 1995 – Mount Roskill
- 1996 – Otahuhu United
- 1997 – Tauranga City
- 1998 – Western Springs
- 1999 – Taupo
- 2000 – Mount Albert-Ponsonby
- 2001 – Tauranga City United
- 2002 – Mangere United
- 2003 – Eastern Suburbs
- 2004 – North Force
- 2005 – South Auckland Rangers
- 2006 – Papatoetoe
- 2007 – Fencibles United
- 2008–2009 – no competition
- 2010 – Mangere United
- 2011 – Mount Albert-Ponsonby
- 2012 – Hibiscus Coast
- 2013 – Western Springs
- 2014 – Tauranga City United
- 2015 – Papakura City
- 2016 – Manukau City
- 2017 – Fencibles United
- 2018 – Takapuna
- 2019 – Albany United
- 2020 – Abandoned due to COVID-19 pandemic in New Zealand
- 2021 – Onehunga-Mangere United
- 2022 – Hibiscus Coast

Northern Conference

- 2023 – Franklin United
- 2024 – Waiheke United
- 2025 – Northland
- 2026 – Bucklands Beach

Southern Conference

- 2023 – Waikato Unicol
- 2024 – Cambridge
- 2025 – Taupo
- 2026 – Ngaruawahia United
