= 2026 NRFL Leagues =

Football championship

NRFL Leagues
- Season: 2026

The 2026 NRFL Leagues is the 62nd and 60th seasons respectively of the NRFL Championship and NRFL Conference, football competitions in New Zealand. Established in 1965, currently twelve teams compete in the Championship while 8 teams compete in the Northern and Southern sections of the Conference League.

== Northern League ==
The Northern League sits above the two NRFL Divisions and is also overseen by Northern Region Football, despite being run by New Zealand Football as part of the New Zealand National League.

Twelve teams are competing in the league – the top ten teams from the previous season and the two teams promoted from the NRFL Championship. The promoted teams are Manukau United and Melville United. Manukau United return after a two-year absence, while Melville United return after one. They replaced Manurewa and West Coast Rangers (both relegated after a three-year Northern League spell).

=== Northern League table ===
Pos	Team	Pld	W	D	L	GF	GA	GD	Pts	Qualification
1	Birkenhead United (C, P, Q)	22	18	4	0	58	13	+45	58	Winner of Northern League, qualification to National League Championship and promoted to National League via ranking
2	Eastern Suburbs (P, Q)	22	14	5	3	41	9	+32	47	Qualification to National League Championship and promoted to National League via ranking
3	Auckland City (P, Q)	22	14	3	5	51	19	+32	45	Qualification to National League Championship and promoted to National League via ranking
4	Auckland United (P, Q)	22	12	5	5	47	21	+26	41	Qualification to National League Championship and promoted to National League via ranking
5	Fencibles United	22	13	2	7	55	36	+19	41	
6	East Coast Bays	22	10	5	7	34	35	−1	35	
7	Auckland FC Reserves (Note: Auckland FC Reserves gain automatic entry into the National League Championship phase and cannot be relegated due to the A-League Men requirements.) (P, Q)	22	8	3	11	38	40	−2	27	Qualification to National League Championship and promoted to National League via ranking
8	Western Springs (O, P)	22	7	3	12	33	40	−7	24	Qualification to 2027 National League play-offs via ranking
9	Melville United	22	6	2	14	24	48	−24	20	
10	Bay Olympic	22	4	4	14	23	56	−33	16	
11	Tauranga City	22	4	3	15	29	52	−23	15	
12	Manukau United	22	2	1	19	14	78	−64	7	

Source: NRF
Rules for classification: 1) Points; 2) Goal difference; 3) Goals scored; 4) Goals against; 5) Head to head; 6) Disciplinary record; 7) Coin toss
(C) Champions; (O) Play-off winners; (P) Promoted; (Q) Qualified for the phase indicated

== Championship ==
NRFL Championship
- Season: 2026
- Dates: March 2026 – September 2026
- Champions: Northern Rovers
- Promoted: Northern Rovers; Takapuna; Hibiscus Coast; Onehunga Mangere United

Each team can field a maximum of six foreign players as well as one additional foreign player who has Oceania Football Confederation nationality.

=== Championship teams ===
Twelve teams are competing in the league – nine teams from the previous season, the two teams relegated from the 2025 Northern League and one team promoted from the NRFL Conference. The relegated teams were Manurewa and West Coast Rangers, while the promoted team is Taupo. Manukau United were promoted alongside Melville United, while Ngaruawahia United were relegated.

Team	Location	Stadium	2024 season
Cambridge	Cambridge	John Kerkhof Park	4th
Ellerslie	Ellerslie, Auckland	Michaels Avenue	9th
Hamilton Wanderers	Chartwell, Hamilton	Porritt Stadium	5th
Hibiscus Coast	Whangaparaoa, Auckland	Stanmore Bay Park	6th
Manurewa	Manurewa, Auckland	War Memorial Park	11th in Northern League (relegated)
Mount Albert-Ponsonby	Mount Albert, Auckland	Anderson Park	11th
North Shore United	Devonport, Auckland	Allen Hill Stadium	8th
Northern Rovers	Glenfield, Auckland	McFetridge Park	3rd
Onehunga Mangere United	Māngere Bridge, Auckland	Māngere Domain	7th
Takapuna	Takapuna, Auckland	Taharoto Park	10th
Taupo	Tauhara, Taupō	Crown Park	1st in Southern Conference (promoted via play-offs)
West Coast Rangers	Whenuapai, Auckland	Fred Taylor Park	12th in Northern League (relegated)

=== Championship personnel and kits ===
Team	Manager	Captain
Cambridge	(New Zealand) Jordan Shaw	
Ellerslie	(New Zealand) Ben Fletcher	Seb Poelman
Hamilton Wanderers	(Wales) Joseph Hinds	
Hibiscus Coast	(New Zealand) Nathan Cranney	
Manurewa	(South Africa) Tashreeq Davids	
Mount Albert-Ponsonby	(New Zealand) Sammy Negash	Lewis Black
North Shore United	(New Zealand) Dave Fahy	
Northern Rovers	(New Zealand) Daniel Donegan	
Onehunga Mangere United	(New Zealand) Paul Marshall	
Takapuna	(New Zealand) Daniel Semp	
Taupo		
West Coast Rangers	(New Zealand) Chad Coombes	

=== Championship table ===
Pos	Team	Pld	W	D	L	GF	GA	GD	Pts	Qualification
1	Northern Rovers (C, P)	22	15	5	2	65	19	+46	50	Promotion to NRFL Premiership
2	Takapuna (P)	22	13	7	2	55	25	+30	46	Promotion to NRFL Premiership
3	Hibiscus Coast (P)	22	12	5	5	45	22	+23	41	Promotion to NRFL Premiership
4	Onehunga Mangere United (P)	22	11	7	4	43	29	+14	40	Promotion to NRFL Premiership
5	Hamilton Wanderers	22	11	6	5	45	30	+15	39	
6	West Coast Rangers	22	9	8	5	46	31	+15	35	
7	North Shore United	22	9	2	11	38	46	−8	29	
8	Taupo	22	7	3	12	27	36	−9	24	
9	Cambridge	21	6	4	11	36	47	−11	22	
10	Mount Albert-Ponsonby	21	6	2	13	29	49	−20	20	
11	Ellerslie	22	4	3	15	30	58	−28	15	
12	Manurewa	22	1	2	19	21	88	−67	5	

Updated to match(es) played on 29 August 2026. Source: Northern Region Football
Rules for classification: 1) Points; 2) Goal difference; 3) Goals scored; 4) Goals against; 5) Head to head; 6) Disciplinary record; 7) Coin toss
(C) Champions; (P) Promoted

=== Championship results table ===
Home \ Away	CAM	ELL	HAM	HBC	MRW	MAP	NSU	NTR	OMU	TAK	TAU	WCR
Cambridge	—	2–2	3–4	1–2	4–0	1–7	1–1	1–3	1–4	4–3	2–1	0–0
Ellerslie	1–2	—	2–0	2–4	2–2	2–3	1–4	0–5	0–1	2–2	1–0	2–3
Hamilton Wanderers	3–2	4–1	—	0–2	6–2	0–0	4–0	2–2	1–1	0–1	3–1	1–1
Hibiscus Coast	2–1	1–0	0–1	—	6–0	0–1	2–1	1–1	3–4	1–2	2–0	1–0
Manurewa	0–2	2–4	2–4	1–5	—	0–4	3–4	0–5	0–4	1–8	1–2	1–2
Mount Albert-Ponsonby		4–2	0–2	0–3	2–0	—	1–2	0–9	0–0	1–2	0–2	0–3
North Shore United	3–1	1–2	3–0	2–1	1–2	4–1	—	0–1	1–3	2–4	1–1	3–1
Northern Rovers	2–1	4–0	2–1	1–1	4–0	2–1	6–2	—	5–1	0–1	4–1	1–2
Onehunga Mangere United	2–1	2–0	1–3	3–3	3–2	2–1	5–0	1–1	—	1–2	2–1	1–1
Takapuna	5–3	6–1	2–2	0–0	1–1	4–1	3–0	1–2	0–0	—	3–0	4–2
Taupo	0–1	3–1	0–2	0–4	2–0	5–1	3–1	0–3	1–1	1–1	—	2–0
West Coast Rangers	2–2	3–2	2–2	1–1	13–1	4–1	0–2	2–2	2–1	0–0	2–1	—

Updated to match(es) played on 29 August 2026. Source: UltimateNZSoccer
Legend: Blue = home team win; Yellow = draw; Red = away team win.

== Northern Conference ==
NRFL Northern Conference
- Season: 2026
- Dates: March 2026 - September 2026
- Champions: Bucklands Beach
- Promoted: Bucklands Beach

=== Northern Conference teams ===
Eight teams are competing in the league – seven teams from the previous season and the champions of the 2025 NRF League One. The promoted team is Te Atatu. Franklin United were relegated.

Team	Location	Stadium	2025 season
Albany United	Albany, Auckland	Rosedale Park	6th
Beachlands Maraetai	Beachlands, Auckland	Te Puru Park	7th
Bucklands Beach	Bucklands Beach, Auckland	Rogers Park	3rd
Central United	Sandringham, Auckland	Kiwitea Street	2nd
Metro	Mount Albert, Auckland	Phyllis Street Reserve	5th
Northland	Whangarei	Morningside Park	1st
Te Atatu	Te Atatū Peninsula, Auckland	Te Atatū Peninsula Park	1st in NRF League One (promoted)
Waitemata	Te Atatū South, Auckland	McLeod Park	4th

=== Northern Conference table ===
Pos	Team	Pld	W	D	L	GF	GA	GD	Pts	Qualification
1	Bucklands Beach (C, P)	21	14	2	5	41	26	+15	44	Promotion to NRFL Championship
2	Metro	21	11	8	2	48	23	+25	41	
3	Northland	21	12	4	5	48	23	+25	40	
4	Central United	21	8	6	7	40	34	+6	30	
5	Waitemata	21	6	8	7	35	37	−2	26	
6	Beachlands Maraetai	21	5	5	11	22	48	−26	20	
7	Te Atatu	21	5	1	15	25	44	−19	16	
8	Albany United	21	3	6	12	27	51	−24	15	

Source: Northern Region Football
Rules for classification: 1) Points; 2) Goal difference; 3) Goals scored; 4) Goals against; 5) Head to head; 6) Disciplinary record; 7) Coin toss
(C) Champions; (P) Promoted

=== Northern Conference results table ===
Home \ Away	ALB	BLM	BUC	CEN	MET	NOR	TAT	WTM	ALB	BLM	BUC	CEN	MET	NOR	TAT	WTM
Albany United	—	5–2	3–0	0–4	0–4	0–1	2–0	3–3	—	—	1–2	2–2	—	—	—	1–2
Beachlands Maraetai	2–1	—	0–6	2–0	0–0	3–2	1–0	3–3	1–1	—	0–1	—	2–2	—	—	—
Bucklands Beach	3–1	2–0	—	1–1	0–3	1–3	4–0	1–0	—	—	—	—	2–0	0–3	2–0	—
Central United	2–0	5–0	2–3	—	1–1	2–5	3–0	1–1	—	4–0	0–5	—	0–0	—	—	2–1
Metro	1–1	2–0	5–1	2–2	—	1–0	4–1	2–0	3–1	—	—	—	—	3–3	3–1	—
Northland	1–1	4–1	1–2	3–1	2–1	—	2–0	2–1	8–0	1–1	—	2–1	—	—	5–0	—
Te Atatu	2–0	3–0	0–1	3–2	2–3	2–0	—	0–0	5–1	2–3	—	2–3	—	—	—	2–4
Waitemata	3–3	3–1	1–2	1–2	2–2	1–1	3–2	—	—	1–0	2–2	—	2–6	2–0	—	—

Source: NZ Soccer Scoreboard
Legend: Blue = home team win; Yellow = draw; Red = away team win.

== Southern Conference ==
NRFL Southern Conference
- Season: 2026
- Dates: March 2026 - September 2026
- Champions: Ngaruawahia United
- Promoted: Ngaruawahia United
- Relegated: Claudelands Rovers; West Hamilton United; Matamata Swifts; Northern United; Ngongotahā Lakes

=== Southern Conference teams ===
Eight teams are competing in the league – six teams from the previous season, one team relegated from the NRFL Championship and one team from WaiBOP League One. The relegated team is Ngaruawahia United. West Hamilton United remained in the league despite being in the relegation position.

Team	Location	Stadium	2025 season
Claudelands Rovers	Claudelands, Hamilton	Galloway Park	4th
Matamata Swifts	Matamata	Matamata Domain	6th
Ngaruawahia United	Ngāruawāhia	Centennial Park, Ngāruawāhia	12th in Championship (relegated)
Ngongotahā Lakes (Note: Ngongotaha AFC signed a Memorandum of Understanding with Lakes FC at the end of the 2022 season to have a combined team for the 2023 season onwards.)	Rotorua	Tamarahi Reserve	7th
Northern United	Rototuna North, Hamilton	Korikori Park	2nd
Otumoetai	Matua, Tauranga	Fergusson Park	3rd
Papamoa	Papamoa, Tauranga	Gordon Spratt Reserve	5th
West Hamilton United	Melville, Hamilton	Mahoe Park	8th

=== Southern Conference table ===
Pos	Team	Pld	W	D	L	GF	GA	GD	Pts	Qualification
1	Ngaruawahia United (C, P)	20	18	1	1	90	20	+70	55	Promotion to NRFL Championship
2	Papamoa	21	12	4	5	49	33	+16	40	
3	Otumoetai	21	11	3	7	48	34	+14	36	
4	Claudelands Rovers (R)	21	10	4	7	56	41	+15	34	Relegation to WaiBOP League One
5	West Hamilton United (R)	21	6	8	7	39	37	+2	26	Relegation to WaiBOP League One
6	Matamata Swifts (R)	21	6	5	10	40	66	−26	23	Relegation to WaiBOP League One
7	Northern United (R)	20	6	2	12	24	30	−6	20	Relegation to WaiBOP League One
8	Ngongotahā Lakes (R)	21	0	1	20	15	100	−85	1	Relegation to WaiBOP League One

Updated to match(es) played on 12 September 2026. Source: Northern Region Football
Rules for classification: 1) Points; 2) Goal difference; 3) Goals scored; 4) Goals against; 5) Head to head; 6) Disciplinary record; 7) Coin toss
(C) Champions; (P) Promoted; (R) Relegated

=== Southern Conference results table ===
Home \ Away	CLR	MAT	NGA	NGO	NTU	OTU	PAP	WHU	CLR	MAT	NGA	NGO	NTU	OTU	PAP	WHU
Claudelands Rovers	—	4–4	0–2	11–0	2–3	2–0	3–1	3–3	—	—	—	—	—	3–2	3–4	0–2
Matamata Swifts	4–4	—	2–6	4–2	1–0	0–4	1–4	2–0	2–2	—	—	2–1	2–1	—	1–3	—
Ngaruawahia United	5–1	11–0	—	8–1		3–2	3–2	2–0	1–2	—	—	—	—	4–0	—	1–1
Ngongotahā Lakes	0–3	4–1	1–8	—	2–3	1–3	0–2	0–5	0–4	1–3	0–10	—	—	—	—	—
Northern United	2–0	4–2	0–1	5–0	—	0–3	0–1	0–0	0–2	—	0–3	4–0	—	—	0–2	—
Otumoetai	1–2	2–2	1–4	3–0	3–1	—	2–2	3–2	—	5–2	—	6–2	1–0	—	0–2	—
Papamoa	2–0	4–3	0–2	5–0	1–1	2–3	—	1–1	—	—	3–6	3–1	—	—	—	2–0
West Hamilton United	3–5	1–1	3–6	6–1	1–0	0–4	3–3	—	—	3–1	—	2–2	3–0	0–0	—	—

Updated to match(es) played on 12 September 2026. Source: UltimateNZSoccer
Legend: Blue = home team win; Yellow = draw; Red = away team win.

== Women's Premiership ==
The NRFL Women's Premiership acts as a qualifier for the New Zealand Women's National League.

Eight teams are competing in the league – the top seven teams from the previous season and the promoted side from the 2025 NRFL Championship. The promoted team is Franklin United as winners of the NRFL Championship. They replaced Northern Rovers.

=== Women's Premiership table ===
2026 New Zealand Women's National League

== Women's Championship ==
NRFL Women's Championship
- Season: 2026
- Dates: April 2026 – September 2026

=== Women's Championship teams ===
Eight teams are competing in the league – six teams from the previous season, the one team relegated from the 2025 NRFL Premiership, Hibiscus Coast, and one team promoted from the NRF Women's Conference as play-off winners. The promoted team is Uni-Mount Bohemian. Melville United were promoted, while Central United were relegated.

Team	Location	Stadium	2025 season
Birkenhead United	Beach Haven, Auckland	Shepherds Park	4th
Cambridge	Cambridge	John Kerkhof Park	5th
Franklin United	Drury	Drury Sports Grounds	2nd
Hibiscus Coast	Whangaparāoa, Auckland	Stanmore Bay Park	8th in NRFL Women's Premiership (relegated)
Northern Rovers	Glenfield, Auckland	McFetridge Park	7th
Onehunga Mangere United	Māngere Bridge, Auckland	Māngere Domain	6th
Onehunga Sports	Onehunga, Auckland	Waikaraka Park	3rd
Uni-Mount Bohemian	Mount Wellington, Auckland	Bill McKinlay Park	1st in NRF League One (promoted via play-offs)

=== Women's Championship table ===
Pos	Team	Pld	W	D	L	GF	GA	GD	Pts	Qualification
1	Birkenhead United (C, P)	21	18	2	1	87	12	+75	56	Promotion to NRFL Women's Premiership
2	Franklin United (P)	21	16	4	1	83	22	+61	52	Promotion to NRFL Women's Premiership
3	Onehunga Sports (P)	21	11	4	6	51	25	+26	37	Promotion to NRFL Women's Premiership
4	Cambridge (P)	21	11	2	8	48	36	+12	35	Promotion to NRFL Women's Premiership
5	Northern Rovers (P)	21	7	2	12	29	54	−25	23	Promotion to NRFL Women's Premiership
6	Onehunga Mangere United (P)	21	5	7	9	31	41	−10	22	Promotion to NRFL Women's Premiership
7	Hibiscus Coast	21	2	2	17	22	104	−82	8	
8	Uni-Mount Bohemian	21	2	1	18	17	74	−57	7	

Source: Northern Region Football
Rules for classification: 1) Points; 2) Goal difference; 3) Goals scored; 4) Goals against; 5) Head to head; 6) Disciplinary record; 7) Coin toss
(C) Champions; (P) Promoted

=== Women's Championship results table ===
Home \ Away	BIR	CAM	FRA	HBC	NTR	OMU	OHS	UMB	BIR	CAM	FRA	HBC	NTR	OMU	OHS	UMB
Birkenhead United	—	6–0	2–2	8–1	4–0	2–1	1–0	4–0	—	3–2	—	—	2–1	—	3–0	—
Cambridge	3–1	—	1–3	8–0	6–0	0–0	2–0	5–0	—	—	0–2	2–0	4–0	—	1–4	—
Franklin United	0–5	8–1	—	9–0	7–0	8–1	4–1	4–2	0–0	—	—	—	—	3–1	—	6–1
Hibiscus Coast	0–3	0–3	0–2	—	0–5	2–2	0–8	8–1	0–15	—	1–6	—	—	0–0	—	—
Northern Rovers	0–6	1–1	1–4	3–1	—	2–1	0–1	2–0	—	—	0–6	5–1	—	1–2	—	3–0
Onehunga Mangere United	1–10	1–2	1–1	8–1	1–1	—	0–0	2–3	0–1	2–1	—	—	—	—	1–3	4–0
Onehunga Sports	0–3	4–0	2–2	6–1	4–0	0–0	—	1–1	—	—	1–3	6–2	2–0	—	—	5–1
Uni-Mount Bohemian	1–4	0–2	1–3	4–3	1–4	0–2	0–3	—	0–4	1–4	—	0–1	—	—	—	—

Source: Northern Region Football
Legend: Blue = home team win; Yellow = draw; Red = away team win.
