= Paige Satchell =

New Zealand footballer (born 1998)

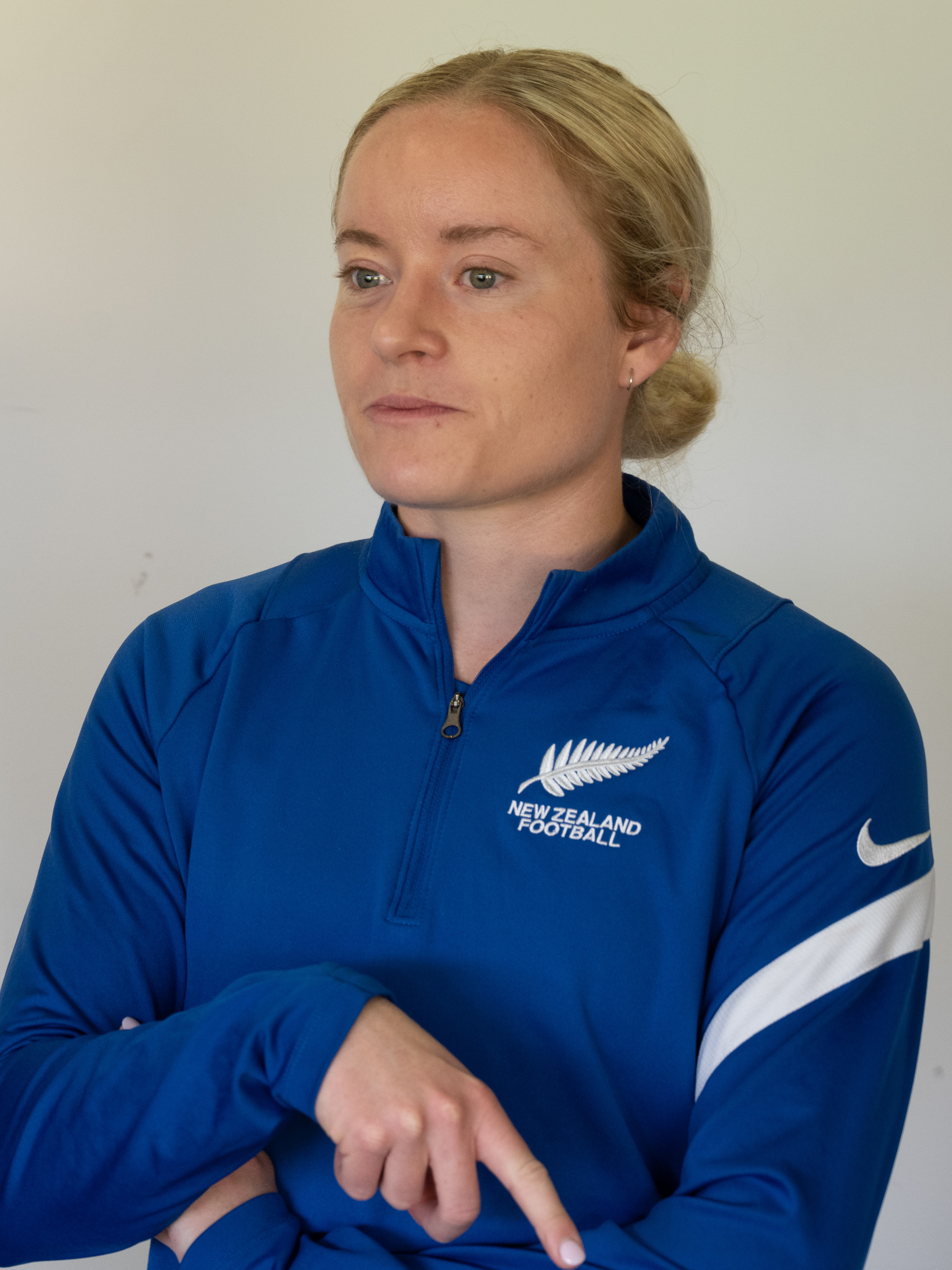
- Satchell in November 2022

Personal information
- Full name: Paige Therese Satchell
- Date of birth: 13 April 1998 (age 28)
- Place of birth: Rotorua, New Zealand,
- Height: 1.60 m (5 ft 3 in)
- Position: Forward

Team information
- Current team: Hibiscus Coast
- Number: 13

Youth career
- Ngongotaha AFC
- Rotorua United

Senior career*
Years	Team	Apps	(Gls)
- WaiBOP United
2015–2019	Three Kings United		
2019–2020	SC Sand	9	(0)
2020–2021	Canberra United	13	(1)
2021–2022	Sydney FC	12	(2)
2022–2023	Wellington Phoenix	15	(1)
2023–2024	London City Lionesses	15	(2)
2025–	Hibiscus Coast	0	(0)

International career^{‡}
2014	New Zealand U17	3	(0)
2015–2018	New Zealand U20	9	(3)
2016–	New Zealand	49	(2)
- * Club domestic league appearances and goals as of 18 September 2024 ‡ National team caps and goals as of 18 September 2024

Paige Therese Satchell (born 13 April 1998) is a footballer from New Zealand who plays for Hibiscus Coast in the NRFL Women's Premiership. She has played for the New Zealand national team in the under-17, under-20, and senior levels, including at the 2023 World Cup. She was a traveling reserve for the New Zealand team at the 2016 Summer Olympics and was a squad member for New Zealand at the 2020 Summer Olympics.

== Early life and education ==
Satchell is from Rotorua, New Zealand. Satchell has an older sister (Eillish) and three older step siblings (Kayne west, Lea, bumcheeks QJ). She first played football at age five. By age nine she was playing football for Ngongotaha AFC. She continued to play for the team through age 14. Satchell also excelled at running, winning a national title in her age group for cross country in 2011. At age 17 she was a student at John Paul College.

== Career ==
Satchell was a member of New Zealand's women's under-17 team for the 2014 Fifa Under-17 Women's World Cup. Satchell later played for the New Zealand national team in the under-20 division, including the 2016 Fifa Under-20 Women's World Cup.

Satchell has played football for Rotorua United. In 2015 she joined Three Kings United. She moved to Auckland to advance her football career. The following year, Satchell was selected to join the New Zealand national team, known as the Ferns, for friendly matches against Australia. She was a travelling reserve for the New Zealand team at the 2016 Summer Olympics. In a December 2016 match against Thailand, Satchell set up two goals and scored a third, helping New Zealand to a 3–1 victory.

On 17 April 2019, Satchell signed her first professional contract, signing with German club SC Sand in the Frauen-Bundesliga for the 2019–20 season.

In November 2020, Satchell joined Australian W-League club Canberra United.

In August 2021, following the 2020 Summer Olympics, Satchell joined W-League club Sydney FC.

In July 2022, following their inaugural season in the A-League Women, Satchell joined Wellington Phoenix. In August 2023, new coach Temple announced that Satchell and her team-mate Emma Rolston decided not to extend their time at the club.

In June 2023, Satchell was named to the New Zealand squad for the 2023 FIFA Women's World Cup. She would appear in the team's (and tournament's) opening match.

On 11 August 2023, following her World Cup performance, Satchell signed for the London City Lionesses. On 19 November 2023, she scored her first goal for the Lionesses in an away match at Lewes.

On 20 March 2025, Satchell signed for NRFL Women's Premiership club Hibiscus Coast.

== International goals ==
Scores and results list New Zealand's goal tally first.

No.	Date	Venue	Opponent	Score	Result	Competition
1.	28 November 2018	Stade de Hnassé, Lifou, New Caledonia	New Caledonia	5–0	8–0	2018 OFC Women's Nations Cup
2.	30 November 2021	Goyang Stadium, Goyang, South Korea	South Korea	1–0	2–0	Friendly
