= NRFL Women's Premiership =

- Founded: 1973
- Country: New Zealand
- Confederation: OFC (Oceania)
- Number of clubs: 8
- Level on pyramid: 2
- Feeder to: New Zealand Women's National League
- Relegation to: NRFL Women's Championship
- Domestic cup: Kate Sheppard Cup
- Current champions: West Coast Rangers (1st title) (2025)
- Most championships: Eastern Suburbs; Lynn-Avon United (9 titles each)
- Website: Northern Region Football
- Current: 2025 NRFL Women's Premiership

The Northern Regional Football League Women's Premiership, currently known as Lotto Sport Italia NRFL Women's Premiership for sponsorship reasons, is a semi-professional New Zealand association football league competition. Up until 2022, the competition was known as NRFL Women's Premier League.

The league includes football clubs located in the northern part of the North Island, with clubs from the Northland, Auckland, Waikato and Bay of Plenty provinces. The league sits at step 2 of the New Zealand football pyramid.

== Current clubs ==
Location of clubs in New Zealand for the 2024 NRFL Women's Premiership season
Location of clubs in Auckland Region for the 2024 NRFL Women's Premiership season

FC Tauranga Moana were promoted as winners of the NRFL Women's Championship. Hamilton Wanderers were relegated to the NRFL Championship after finishing bottom last season.

| Team | Location | Home Ground | 2024 season |
|---|---|---|---|
| Auckland United | Mount Roskill, Auckland | Keith Hay Park | 1st |
| Eastern Suburbs | Kohimarama, Auckland | Madills Farm | 3rd |
| Ellerslie | Ellerslie, Auckland | Michaels Avenue Reserve | 7th |
| Fencibles United | Pakuranga, Auckland | Riverhills Domain | 5th |
| FC Tauranga Moana | Mount Maunganui | Links Avenue Reserve | 1st in NRFL Women's Championship (promoted) |
| Hibiscus Coast | Whangaparāoa, Auckland | Stanmore Bay Park | 6th |
| West Coast Rangers | Whenuapai, Auckland | Fred Taylor Park | 2nd |
| Western Springs | Westmere, Auckland | Seddon Fields | 4th |

== Past champions ==
- 1973 – Metro College
- 1974 – Blockhouse Bay
- 1975 – Eastern Suburbs
- 1976 – Eastern Suburbs
- 1977 – Eastern Suburbs
- 1978 – Eastern Suburbs
- 1979 – Eastern Suburbs
- 1980 – Eastern Suburbs
- 1981 – Mt Wellington
- 1982 – Mt Wellington
- 1983 – Mt Wellington
- 1984 – Mt Wellington
- 1985 – Mt Wellington
- 1986 – Mt Wellington
- 1987 – Eden
- 1988 – Massey
- 1989 – South Auckland Rangers
- 1990 – West Auckland
- 1991 – Eden
- 1992 – Pakuranga Town
- 1993 – Avondale United
- 1994 – Te Atatu
- 1995 – Avondale United
- 1996 – Lynn-Avon United
- 1997 – Lynn-Avon United
- 1998 – Three Kings United
- 1999 – Three Kings United
- 2000 – Lynn-Avon United
- 2001 – Lynn-Avon United
- 2002 – Lynn-Avon United
- 2003 – Lynn-Avon United
- 2004 – Lynn-Avon United
- 2005 – Lynn-Avon United
- 2006 – Three Kings United
- 2007 – Three Kings United
- 2008 – Western Springs
- 2009 – Lynn-Avon United
- 2010 – Glenfield Rovers
- 2011 – Glenfield Rovers
- 2012 – Claudelands Rovers
- 2013 – Eastern Suburbs
- 2014 – Forrest Hill-Milford United
- 2015 – Claudelands Rovers
- 2016 – Three Kings United
- 2017 – Three Kings United
- 2018 – Glenfield Rovers
- 2019 – Eastern Suburbs
- 2020 – season cancelled due to COVID-19
- 2021 – Eastern Suburbs
- 2022 – Northern Rovers
- 2023 – Auckland United
- 2024 – Auckland United
- 2025 – West Coast Rangers
