= Papamoa FC =

- Full name: Papamoa Football Club
- Founded: 1995; 31 years ago
- Ground: Gordon Spratt Reserve, Papamoa Beach
- Capacity: 1,000
- Chairman: Maaka Nelson
- Manager: Vacant
- League: NRFL Southern Conference
- 2026: NRFL Southern Conference, 2nd of 8
- Website: https://papamoafc.co.nz/

Papamoa FC is a football club based in Papamoa Beach, Tauranga, New Zealand. They currently play in the NRFL Southern Conference.

== History ==
The club were formed in 1995, by Alan Bright and Iain Cargill. The crest features the sun, sea and the sand, representing the clubs philosophies.

The club has competed in the Chatham Cup seven times first competing in 1999, with their best appearance being in 2018 and 2022 where they reached the fourth round. In 2018 they were knocked out by Birkenhead United losing 5–1, and in 2022 they lost 3–0 to Hamilton Wanderers.

Papamoa signed an agreement in 2023 with Tauranga City to form a shared-entity FC Tauranga Moana. Initially only having youth teams, Otumoetai joined Papamoa and Tauranga City to form a women's team in 2024 to take part in the NRFL Women's Championship.

== Past players ==
- (New Zealand) Tommy Smith
- (New Zealand) Olivia Chance
- (New Zealand) Rebekah Stott
