= NRFL Championship =

- Founded: 1965
- Country: New Zealand
- Confederation: OFC (Oceania)
- Number of clubs: 12
- Level on pyramid: 3
- Promotion to: Northern League
- Relegation to: NRFL Northern Conference; NRFL Southern Conference
- Domestic cup: Chatham Cup
- Current champions: Northern Rovers (1st title) (2026)
- Most championships: Birkenhead United; Central United; East Coast Bays; Onehunga Sports (3 titles each)
- Website: nrf.org.nz
- Current: 2026 NRFL Championship

The Northern Regional Football League Championship, currently known as Lotto Sport Italia NRFL Championship for sponsorship reasons, is a semi-professional New Zealand association football league competition. Up until 2022, the competition was known as NRFL Division 1.

The league includes football clubs located in the northern part of the North Island, with clubs from the Northland, Auckland, Waikato and Bay of Plenty provinces. The league sits at step 3 of the New Zealand football pyramid.

== Current clubs ==
Location of clubs in New Zealand for the 2026 NRFL Championship season
Location of clubs in Auckland Region for the 2026 NRFL Championship season

Manurewa and West Coast Rangers joined the league following their relegation the season prior from the Northern League. Taupo were promoted as winners of NRFL Conference play-offs.

Manukau United won the 2025 season and were promoted to the Northern League alongside Melville United, while Ngaruawahia United were relegated to NRFL Southern Conference.

Team	Location	Stadium	2025 season
Cambridge	Cambridge	John Kerkhof Park	4th
Ellerslie	Ellerslie, Auckland	Michaels Avenue	9th
Hamilton Wanderers	Chartwell, Hamilton	Porritt Stadium	5th
Hibiscus Coast	Whangaparaoa, Auckland	Stanmore Bay Park	6th
Manurewa	Manurewa, Auckland	Memorial Park	11th in Northern League (relegated)
Mount Albert-Ponsonby	Mount Albert, Auckland	Anderson Park	11th
North Shore United	Devonport, Auckland	Allen Hill Stadium	8th
Northern Rovers	Glenfield, Auckland	McFetridge Park	3rd
Onehunga Mangere United	Māngere Bridge, Auckland	Māngere Domain	7th
Takapuna	Takapuna, Auckland	Taharoto Park	10th
Taupo	Tauhara, Taupō	Crown Park	1st in Southern Conference (promoted via play-offs)
West Coast Rangers	Whenuapai, Auckland	Fred Taylor Park	12th in Northern League (relegated)

== Past winners ==
Numbers in parentheses indicate wins up to that date.

Season	Winner	Promoted
1965	Ponsonby	Eden
1966	Lynndale	Hamilton
1967	Birkenhead United	Rotorua City
1968	Courier Rangers	Hamilton
1969	Whangarei	Birkenhead United
1970	Takapuna City	Papatoetoe; East Coast Bays; Huntly Thistle
1971	Metro College	Ellerslie
1972	Papakura City	Lynndale
1973	Manurewa	Papatoetoe
1974	Whangarei City (2)	Takapuna City
1975	Lynndale (2)	Rotorua City
1976	Glenfield Rovers	Metro College
1977	Ellerslie	Mt. Roskill
1978	East Coast Bays	Metro College
1979	Waitemata City	Papatoetoe
1980	Birkenhead United (2)	Rotorua City
1981	Eden	Whangarei City
1982	University	Lynndale
1983	Otara Rangers (Note: No promotion to the Northern League due to the resizing of the league in 1984.)	
1984	Howick	Papakura City
1985	Mount Maunganui	Otara Rangers
1986	Waikato	Oratia United; Kelston West
1987	Mount Albert-Ponsonby (Note: First title was won as Ponsonby.) (2)	Manukau City; Blockhouse Bay
1988	Central	Rotorua City
1989	East Coast Bays (2)	Massey
1990	University (2)	
1991	Central (2)	Rotorua City; Kawerau Town
1992	Tauranga City	Eden; Pakuranga Town
1993	Melville United	Onehunga Sports
1994	Metro (2)	Ngaruawahia United
1995	Cambridge	Northland United; Hamilton Wanderers; Takapuna
1996	Glenfield Rovers (Note: No promotion to the Northern League due to the restructuring of the National league in 1996—97.) (2)	
1997	Hamilton Wanderers	Glenfield Rovers
1998	Three Kings United	Tauranga City
1999	Takapuna (2)	Eastern Suburbs
2000	Central United (3)	Manukau City
2001	Onehunga Sports	Bay Olympic
2002	Waitakere City	University-Mount Wellington
2003	East Coast Bays (3)	Mangere United
2004	Papakura City (2)	
2005	Albany United	Birkenhead United
2006	Onehunga Sports (2)	Hamilton Wanderers
2007	Lynn-Avon United	Melville United; Metro; Three Kings United; Papatoetoe; Mount Albert-Ponsonby
2008	Manurewa (2)	
2009	Three Kings United (2)	
2010 (Note: Division 1 split into two leagues after a grading round with Hamilton Wanderers winning Division 1A and Onehunga Sports winning Division 1B.)	Hamilton Wanderers (2); Onehunga Sports (3)	
2011	Eastern Suburbs	Manurewa
2012	Birkenhead United (3)	Ellerslie
2013	Glenfield Rovers (3)	Ngaruawahia United
2014	Western Springs	Eastern Suburbs; Melville United
2015	Forrest Hill Milford United	Tauranga City United
2016	Waitakere City (2)	Manurewa
2017	Western Springs (2)	Manukau City
2018	Melville United (2)	North Shore United
2019	Forrest Hill Milford United (2)	Bay Olympic
2020	Abandoned due to COVID-19 pandemic in New Zealand	
2021 (Note: Season cancelled with games in hand due to COVID-19 pandemic in New Zealand.)	Waiheke United	Takapuna
2022	West Coast Rangers	Manurewa
2023	Tauranga City (2)	East Coast Bays
2024	Fencibles United	
2025	Manukau United	Melville United
2026	Northern Rovers	Takapuna; Hibiscus Coast; Onehunga Mangere United
