= Otumoetai FC =

- Full name: Otumoetai Football Club
- Founded: 1964; 62 years ago
- Ground: Fergusson Park, Matua, Tauranga
- Capacity: 1,000
- Manager: Joseph Dixon
- League: NRFL Southern Conference
- 2026: NRFL Southern Conference, 3rd of 8
- Website: https://otumoetaifootball.co.nz/

Otumoetai FC is a football club based in Matua, Tauranga, New Zealand. They currently play in the NRFL Southern Conference.

== History ==
The club were formed in 1964, and play their games at Fergusson Park.

Otumoetai first competed in the Chatham Cup in 1988, making the third round twice in 2012 and 2023.

In 2023 Papamoa signed an agreement with Tauranga City to form a shared-entity FC Tauranga Moana. Initially only having youth teams, Otumoetai joined Papamoa and Tauranga City to form a women's team in 2024 to take part in the NRFL Women's Championship.
