= Beachlands Maraetai AFC =

Beachlands Maraetai
- Full name: Beachlands Maraetai Association Football Club
- Nickname: Beachlands
- Founded: 1984; 42 years ago
- Ground: Te Puru Park, Beachlands
- Manager: Munith Naidu
- League: NRFL Northern Conference
- 2026: NRFL Northern Conference, 6th of 8
- Website: https://bmafc.co.nz/

Beachlands Maraetai AFC is a football club based in Beachlands, New Zealand. They currently play in the NRFL Northern Conference.

== History ==
The club finished second in the NRF Championship in both 2017 and 2018, losing the promotion playoff games both years. They went one better in 2019, winning the championship and being promoted to the NRFL Division 2. In 2021, Beachlands finished third, just missing out on promotion to Division 1.

As of 2022, the club has competed in the Chatham Cup eleven times. They first entered the competition 2006, and their best appearance was in 2017, when they reached the third round. In that year, they received a bye in the first round, then beat Norwest United in the second round on penalties, before losing to Ngongotaha in the third round. Their biggest win in the Chatham Cup came in their first ever game, beating Manatu United 3–0.

Beachlands Maraetai hold a Memorandum of Understanding (MoU) with Bucklands Beach AFC, allowing players to move between the clubs each season.

== Honours ==
- NRF Championship: 2019
