= Ross Nicholson =

New Zealand footballer (born 1975)

Personal information
- Full name: Ross McGregor Nicholson
- Date of birth: 8 August 1975 (age 51)
- Place of birth: Gisborne, New Zealand
- Height: 1.82 m (5 ft 11 1/2 in)
- Position: Goalkeeper

Senior career*
Years	Team	Apps	(Gls)
–1992	Gisborne City	16	
1993–2005	Central United	345	
–1996	Sembawang Rangers	22	
2003–2004	Kings FC	20	
2006–2009	Auckland City FC	100	
2009–2010	YoungHeart Manawatu	14	
2010	Albany United FC	22	
2011–2013	Glenfield Rovers	66	
2002	Sydney United FC	16	
2009	Maori Futsal	5	
2008–2009	Onehunga Sports	36	
2016–2017	Waitakere City FC	30	
2020	Takapuna AFC Div 3	20	
Total		711	

International career^{‡}
1998–2006	New Zealand	13	(0)
Medal record
Representing New Zealand
Men's Association football
OFC Nations Cup
Winner	1998 Australia
Runner-up	2000 Tahiti
- * Club domestic league appearances and goals as of 29 April 2010 ‡ National team caps and goals as of 29 March 2008

Ross Nicholson (born 8 August 1975) is an association football goalkeeper who represented New Zealand at international level. He was born at Gisborne, New Zealand in 1975.

== International career ==
Nicholson made his full All Whites debut as a substitute in an 8–1 win over Vanuatu at the OFC Nations Cup in Australia on 28 September 1998. He was included in the New Zealand squad for the 1999 Confederations Cup finals tournament in Mexico where he was an unused substitute, and was first choice goalkeeper for Auckland City FC at the 2006 FIFA Club World Cup in Japan.

Nicholson ended his international playing career with 14 A-international caps to his credit, his final cap being in a 0–0 draw with Estonia on 31 May 2006.

== Honours ==
Central United FC

- New Zealand National Soccer League: 1999, 2001
- Chatham Cup: 1997, 1998, 2005

Auckland City FC

- New Zealand Football Championship: 2005/06, 2006/07, 2008/09
- FIFA Club World Cup: 2006

New Zealand

- OFC Nations Cup: 1998; Runner-up, 2000

New Zealand All Whites Under 19 National Team

- 6 Appearances: 1992

New Zealand All Whites National Team

- 14 Appearances: 1998 to 2006
- Merdeka Tournament Cup Winners: 2000
- FIFA Confederations Cup - Mexico: 1999

== Honours ==
New Zealand

- OFC Nations Cup: 1998; Runner-up, 2000
