= West Coast Rangers FC =

New Zealand association football club

- Full name: West Coast Rangers Football Club
- Nickname: Rangers
- Founded: 2021 (5 years ago)
- Ground: Fred Taylor Park, Whenuapai, New Zealand
- Chairman: Mike Brooke
- Coach: Matt Jansen
- League: NRFL Championship
- 2026: NRFL Championship, 6th of 12
- Website: westcoastrangers.co.nz
Home colours	Away colours

West Coast Rangers Football Club is an amateur football club based in Whenuapai, New Zealand.

Formed in 2021 as an amalgamation between Waitakere City and Norwest United, West Coast Rangers compete in the NRFL Championship.

The women's team currently competes in the New Zealand Women's National League.

The club also competes in both the Chatham Cup and Kate Sheppard Cup, New Zealand's premier knockout tournaments for men and women. Both teams received a bye in the 2021 Chatham Cup and 2021 Kate Sheppard Cup preliminary round with the men's team also receiving a bye in the first round, along with other ranked teams. The men lost their first game of the Chatham Cup when they lost to tier 4 side Ngaruawahia United 2–1. The women's team won their first game 2–0 over Hibiscus Coast in the Kate Sheppard Cup.

== Current squad ==
As of 21 June 2021

Note: Flags indicate national team as defined under FIFA eligibility rules; some limited exceptions apply. Players may hold more than one non-FIFA nationality.

No.	Pos.	Nation	Player
—		NZL	Matthew Upton
—		NZL	James Dunn
—		NZL	Sam McLaggan
—		NZL	Luca Taylor
—		NZL	Max Drake
—		NZL	Josh Jones
—		ENG	Ben Hutter
—		TUV	Jason Alama
—		TUV	Maalosi Alefaio
—		NZL	Jason Hicks
—		CHI	Ignacio Machuca
—		RSA	Caylem Nelson

No.	Pos.	Nation	Player
—		NZL	Daniel McDowall
—		NZL	Ben Gallagher
—		MAS	Sahadev Pokhrel
—		NZL	Joey Omotani
—		NZL	Allan Pearce
—		BOT	Kwame Norku
—		SCO	Steven MacDonald
—		NZL	Matt Darrah
—		NZL	Frank Clarke
—		NZL	Joshua Armitt
—		ARG	Franco Gandini
