= Michael Ridenton =

New Zealand footballer

Personal information
- Full name: Michael E Ridenton
- Date of birth: 28 March 1968 (age 58)
- Place of birth: New Zealand
- Position: Defender

Senior career*
Years	Team	Apps	(Gls)
ante 1988-post 1993	Mount Wellington		
2001	Central United		

International career
1988–1993	New Zealand	40 in total and 14 a caps	(0)
- * Club domestic league appearances and goals

Michael Ridenton (born 28 March 1968) was a footballer who represented New Zealand at international level.

Ridenton made his full All Whites debut in a 4–0 win over Taiwan on 11 December 1988 and ended his international playing career with 40 caps including 14 A-international caps to his credit, his final cap - an appearance in a 0–3 loss to Australia on 6 June 1993.
