= FC Whangarei =

- Full name: Football Club Whangarei
- Founded: 1950
- Ground: Rawhiti Street Reserve, Morningside, Whangārei, New Zealand
- Chairman: Derek Bon
- League: NRF Northland Division 1
- 2026: NRF Northland Division 1, 2nd of 7
Home colours	Away colours

FC Whangarei is a semi-professional association football club in Whangārei, New Zealand. They club competes in the NRF Northland Division 1.
