= Bucklands Beach AFC =

- Full name: Bucklands Beach Association Football Club
- Founded: 1976
- Ground: Rogers Park, Bucklands Beach
- Coach: (New Zealand) Tim Ragg
- League: NRFL Championship
- 2026: NRFL Northern Conference, 1st of 8 (promoted)
Home colours

Bucklands Beach AFC is a semi-professional football club based in Bucklands Beach, New Zealand. The club competes in the NRFL Championship.

Having won promotion to the NRFL Division 2 for the first time in the 2016 season, Bucklands Beach immediately won promotion to NRFL Division 1 in 2017.

The club has also completed in the Chatham Cup a number of times including every year since 2013. Their best run was in 2023 when it made it to the fourth round before losing 0–9 to Auckland City FC.

In 2026, the club is celebrating their 50th anniversary and in special remembrance of this, they created a brand new uniform with a 50th anniversary badge on their uniform for this season. They also secured promotion into the NRFL Championship by securing a 2-nil win over Te Atatu AFC on 5th September 2026.

== Notable players ==
- (New Zealand) Milly Clegg
- (New Zealand) Jacqui Hand
