= Matamata Swifts AFC =

Matamata Swifts
- Full name: Matamata Swifts Association Football Club
- Nickname: The Swifts
- Founded: 1930
- Ground: Matamata Domain Matamata, New Zealand
- Capacity: 900
- Chairman: Dwayne Barlow
- Manager: Duncan Lowry
- League: NRFL Southern Conference
- 2026: NRFL Southern Conference, 6th of 8 (relegated)
Home colours	Away colours

Matamata Swifts AFC is a semi-professional association football club in Matamata, New Zealand.

Matamata Swifts competes in the NRFL Southern Conference. The club will also compete in the Chatham Cup, having reached a record last 32 position in New Zealand's only national cup competition. In the 2021 season, The Swifts finished 10th in the WAIBOP Soccer Shop Premiership, narrowly avoiding relegation to the Championship.

== History ==
Matamata Swifts Association Football Club was established in 1930 and football has been played at different levels and with varying success every year since.

In 2019, Matamata Swifts AFC fielded four senior teams (three men and one ladies), nine junior teams (players aged 8 to 12) and eight mini-kickers teams (players aged 4 to 7). The club supports football at Matamata College, which fielded five youth teams in 2019. Matamata's historical rivals are Te Awamutu AFC.

== Current squad ==
Note: Flags indicate national team as defined under FIFA eligibility rules; some limited exceptions apply. Players may hold more than one non-FIFA nationality.

No.	Pos.	Nation	Player
1	GK	NZL	Andrew Gibbs
13	GK	NZL	Callum Roberson
2	MF	PHI	Radge Avegonzado
3	DF	NZL	Chris Monteith
4	DF	NZL	Jamie Baxter
5	DF	NZL	Adam Harris
6	DF	NZL	Ruben Wigelsworth
7	MF	NZL	Brad West
8	MF	NZL	Scott Parsonage
9	FW	NZL	Chris Walker
10	MF	NZL	Andrew Clothier
11	MF	NZL	Kyle Wisnewiski
12	MF	ENG	Mike Smith
13	DF	NZL	Dwayne Signel
16	MF	NZL	Lawrence Clothier
17	DF	ENG	Danny Styles
18	MF	CHI	Hardy Ross
19	MF	NZL	Hayden Turlington
20	DF	NZL	Bjorn Vossen
21	MF	ENG	Sam Hills
22	DF	NZL	Mike Candy
23	MF	PHI	Anton Ganas

== Honours ==
- 2010 Promotion to Lotto NRFL Division 1
- 2009 Waikato Bay of Plenty Football Federation Division 1, Winners
- 2008 Waikato Bay of Plenty Football Federation Division 1, Runners-Up
- 2007 Waikato Bay of Plenty Football Federation Division 1, Runners-Up
- 2006 Waikato Premier League, Winners
- 2006 Caper Cup, Winners
- 2005 Waikato Premier League, Winners
- 1995 Northern League Division 4, Runners-Up
- 1994 Northern League Division 4, Runners-Up
- 1985 Northern League Division 4 (South), Winners
