= NRFL Women's Championship =

- Founded: 1974, as NRFL Women's Division Two; 2023, as NRFL Women's Championship
- Country: New Zealand
- Confederation: OFC (Oceania)
- Number of clubs: 8
- Level on pyramid: 3
- Promotion to: NRFL Women's Premiership
- Relegation to: NRF Women's Conference; WaiBOP W-League
- Domestic cup: Kate Sheppard Cup
- Current champions: Melville United (1st title) (2025)
- Most championships: Lynndale; Westlake Girls High School (2 titles each)
- Website: Northern Region Football
- Current: 2026 NRFL Women's Championship

The Northern Regional Football League Women's Championship, currently known as Lotto Sport Italia NRFL Women's Championship for sponsorship reasons, is a semi-professional New Zealand association football league competition. The league began in 1974 as NRFL Women's Division Two until 1992 when it was dissolved. On four separate occasions since, there were plate competitions of the NRFL Women's Premiership with the winners considered Division Two winners. In 2023, after the restructuring of New Zealand football leagues in 2021, the league was reestablished as the NRFL Women's Championship.

The league includes football clubs located in the northern part of the North Island, with clubs from the Northland, Auckland, Waikato and Bay of Plenty provinces. The league sits at step 3 of the New Zealand football pyramid.

== Current clubs ==
Location of clubs in Auckland Region for the 2026 NRFL Women's Championship season

Hibiscus Coast were relegated from the 2025 NRFL Women's Premiership, replacing 2025 winners Melville United, while Uni-Mount Bohemian were promoted from NRF League One to the NRFL Women's Championship and Central United were relegated.

As of 2026 season:

Team	Location	Stadium	2025 season
Birkenhead United	Beach Haven, Auckland	Shepherds Park	4th
Cambridge	Cambridge	John Kerkhof Park	5th
Franklin United	Drury	Drury Sports Grounds	2nd
Hibiscus Coast	Whangaparāoa, Auckland	Stanmore Bay Park	8th in NRFL Women's Premiership (relegated)
Northern Rovers	Glenfield, Auckland	McFetridge Park	7th
Onehunga Mangere United	Māngere Bridge, Auckland	Māngere Domain	6th
Onehunga Sports	Onehunga, Auckland	Waikaraka Park	3rd
Uni-Mount Bohemian	Mount Wellington, Auckland	Bill McKinlay Park	1st in NRF League One (promoted via play-offs)

== Past champions ==
- 1974 – Grey Lynn
- 1975 – Teachers United
- 1976 – Birkenhead United
- 1977 – Manukau City
- 1978 – Kelston West
- 1979 – Westlake Girls High School
- 1980 – North Shore United
- 1981 – Blockhouse Bay
- 1982 – Otara Rangers
- 1983 – Westlake Girls High School
- 1984 – Eden
- 1985 – Massey
- 1986 – Takapuna City
- 1987 – Lynndale
- 1988 – Otahuhu United
- 1989 – Glenfield Rovers
- 1990 – Lynndale
- 1991 – Avondale Collegiate
- 1992 – West Auckland
- 1993–2000 No competition
- 2001 – Eastern Suburbs (plate)
- 2002–2009 No competition
- 2010 – Lynn Avon United (plate)
- 2011 – Three Kings United (plate)
- 2012 – No competition
- 2013 – Pukekohe (plate)
- 2014–2022 No competition
- 2023 – Fencibles United
- 2024 – FC Tauranga Moana
- 2025 – Melville United
