= Metro FC (New Zealand) =

Metro F.C.
- Founded: 1899; 127 years ago
- Ground: Phyllis Street Reserve, Mt Albert, Auckland, New Zealand
- Capacity: 3000 500 + seated
- Chairman: (England) Ants Owens
- Manager: Neil Sykes
- League: NRFL Northern Conference
- 2026: NRFL Northern Conference, 2nd of 8
Home colours

Metro F.C. is a New Zealand association football club, based in Auckland, that competes in the NRFL Northern Conference.

The club was known as Metro College until the 1980s. They were members of the former top premier New Zealand football league the New Zealand National Soccer League which ended in 2004 to give way to the New Zealand Football Championship. The senior team is led by Nathan Christie;– an experienced coach both as a head coach and assistant coach, Nathan Christie took over in the 2018 season after the club was relegated to Lotto Sport Italia NRFL Division 2 after the 2017 season. The club has a good history of playing at one of the two top level football leagues in New Zealand after the New Zealand Football Championship, they have also won one of the top leagues in New Zealand football the Northern League in the 1998 season and also managing to set a record of scoring the most goals in any match of the top New Zealand football national cup the Chatham Cup demolishing Norwest 21–0.

== History ==
Metro was established in 1899 as the Tabernacle-Metropolitan Club by parishioners of the local Baptist Church. Claiming to be Auckland's second-oldest existing club after North Shore United (founded in 1898), the club shortened its name to Metropolitan in 1921. Following a merger with College United in 1929, it adopted the name Metro College, which was later shortened to Metro in 1986.

The club is based at Phyllis Street Reserve in Mount Albert, Auckland, its home ground since 1950.

Metro shares the record for the largest victory in any stage of the Chatham Cup. In 1991, they defeated Norwest 21–0, a record later equaled in 2005 by Central United (coincidentally also against Norwest). Metro has reached the semi-finals of the cup twice, in 1946 and 1998, but has never appeared in a final.

== Youth team and academy ==
Metro F.C. is recognised for its strong youth teams and organised academy system. The club's U-19 team reached the finals of the 2009 Auckland Football Federation U-19 tournament qualifications but lost 2–1 to Mangere United U-19 team, missing out on a spot at the top football national youth tournament in New Zealand, the 2009 Napier National U-19 Championships. However, they secured 2nd place and qualified for the tournament, later reaching the semi-finals of the 2009 Napier National U-19 Championship Satellite (2nd tier).

== Honours ==
Season(s)	Achievement
1946	Semi-finals of the 1946 Chatham Cup
1971	Northern League Division Two, 1st Winners
1987	Northern League Division One Knockout, Winners
1994	Northern League Division One, 1st Winners
1996	National Superclub & Northern Superclub championship, Winners
1998	Northern League, 1st Winners Semi-finals of 1998 Chatham Cup
1999	North Island Soccer League, 6th placed
2000	New Zealand National Soccer League, 10th placed
2001	New Zealand National Soccer League, 10th placed
