= Taupo AFC =

Taupo
- Full name: Taupo Association Football Club
- Founded: 1956
- Ground: Crown Reserve, Taupō
- Chairman: John McCartney
- Coach: Raymond How
- League: NRFL Championship
- 2026: NRFL Championship, 8th of 12
Home colours

Taupo is an amateur football club based in Taupō, New Zealand. The club competes in the NRFL Championship.

== History ==
The club was founded as Taupo United in 1956. It was officially formed on 12 March 1956 after a meeting chaired by J. L. Burge at Rickit's Supper Room. Mr F. Howes was elected as the club's first president. Taupo played its first game on 14 April 1956 against Whakatāne, losing 3–4. The first game to be played in Taupo was on 16 June against the Crusaders of Rotorua, which ended in a nil-all draw. Taupo achieved its first win by defeating the Rotorua team, Caledonian United, at home with a score of 3–1 on 14 July. At the end of its first season, Taupo had played 17 competition and friendly games, winning four, drawing four, and losing nine, with 34 goals scored for and 18 against. In 1957, Taupo withdrew from Bay of Plenty competitions due to players having work commitments on Saturdays. The club was reformed in 1962 under the name Taupo Soccer Club. In 1969, the club changed its name once again to Taupo.

Taupo has entered the Chatham Cup, New Zealand's premier knock-out tournament, on multiple occasions. Its best run in the Chatham Cup was in 2001 when it reached the final 16, only to lose 4–1 to Eastern Suburbs.
