= Ngongotaha AFC =

- Full name: Ngongotaha AFC
- Nicknames: The Villagers, Ngongy
- Founded: 1966; 60 years ago
- Ground: Stembridge Road
- League: NRFL Southern Conference
- 2026: NRFL Southern Conference, 8th of 8 (relegated)
- Website: http://www.sporty.co.nz/ngongotahaafc
Home colours	Away colours

Ngongotaha AFC (nɔːŋgoʊtɑːhɑː), also known as the Villagers, is an association football club based in Rotorua, New Zealand. They play their home matches at Stembridge Road.

They currently compete in the NRFL Southern Conference as Ngongotaha Lakes. They signed a Memorandum of Understanding with Lakes FC at the end of the 2022 season to have a combined team for the 2023 season onwards., however the club now runs all it own senior mens teams independently.

== History ==
=== 1966–1977: Founding Years ===
Ngongotaha AFC was founded in 1966 in Rotorua, New Zealand. The club began playing its matches at Tamarahi Reserve on Stembridge Road in Ngongotahā.

=== 1978–1994: Northern League ===
From 1978 to 1994 the club competed in the Northern League football structure, beginning in division four south. The club gained promotion to the third division by winning the league in 1983, dropping only 14 points in the whole season. The club remained in the third division for a further three seasons before gaining a promotion by finishing in second place in 1986. The club stayed in the second flight for eight seasons, with the best performance being a fourth-place finish in 1988.

From 1989 to 1994 the performance of the team began to drop, and they finished bottom of the table with only 10 points in 1994. Following this they were relegated to the newly restructured Waikato-Bay of Plenty Premier League.

=== 1994 – present: Federation Football ===
Since 1994 the club has boasted three senior men's team and one senior women's team. The first team have played in the Waikato-Bay of Plenty Federation Premiership for the vast majority of this period. They were briefly relegated to the championship in 2008, but won the championship in 2011 gaining promotion to the premiership once again.

In 2014 the club had its best ever performance in the Chatham Cup when they reached the round of 16. They were eliminated at home by Melville United.

In 2016 the club won their maiden Waikato-Bay of Plenty Federation Premiership title with three games in hand and unbeaten. They won a playoff series against the winners of the Auckland Football Federation/Northland Football Federation Men's Conference winners later in 2016.

For three seasons they played in the Northern League division 2, but were relegated in 2019 and now play in the Southern Conference of the NRFL.

== Club Achievements ==
=== Club Honours ===
- Champions – Northern League Division Four South 1983
- Runners Up – Northern League Division Three South 1986
- Knockout Winners – Northern League Division Two 1987
- Champions – Waikato-Bay of Plenty Federation Championship 2011
- Runners Up – Waikato-Bay of Plenty Federation Premiership 2015
- Champions - Waikato-Bay of Plenty Federation Premiership 2016
