= Ngaruawahia United AFC =

Ngaruawahia United
- Full name: Ngaruawahia United Association Football Club
- Nickname: The Green Machine
- Founded: 1968
- Ground: Centennial Park, Ngāruawāhia
- Capacity: Public Park
- Manager: Mark Cossey
- League: NRFL Championship
- 2026: NRFL Southern Conference, 1st of 8 (promoted)
Home colours	Away colours

Ngaruawahia United AFC is an association football club based in Ngāruawāhia, New Zealand. They compete in the NRFL Championship, following back-to-back promotions from the WaiBOP Premiership in 2021 and NRFL Division 2 in 2022. Ngaruawahia United AFC play their home matches at Centennial Park, Ngāruawāhia.

== History ==
The club was formed in 1968 as Ngaruawahia United, made up primarily of the teenagers attending Ngaruawahia High School. Following the amalgamation of Ngaruawahia United and Affco Rangers in 1977 the club became known as Ngaruawahia-Affco United. In 1986 Affco was dropped from the name.

=== 1998 Chatham Cup run ===
In 1998 Ngaruawahia United went on a Chatham Cup run that took the club all the way to the semi-finals. Ngaruawahia United occupied the sports headlines in New Zealand until they met Dunedin Technical. Playing away from home, Ngaruawahia United had several chances to cause an upset, but it was the South Islanders who would prevail 2–0.

=== International friendlies ===
Ngaruawahia United's notable international fixtures include a 2–1 win over Tonga, back in the 1990s at Centennial Park. Ngaruawahia United played its next international friendly match against the champions of the Solomon Islands Marist FC – emphasising the Kiwi clubs strong South Pacific connections. After a goalless first half, Marist FC scored two late goals to take the game. Shortly after this match, Ngaruawahia United signed Solomon Islands international player Stanley Waita. Waita was a significant factor in Ngaruawahia United's promotion charge.

In 2007, Ngaruawahia United played Solomon Islands U-20 at Centennial Park, losing the match 5–1. Lance Louvie scored for Ngaruawahia United. The next international fixture saw a match with Samoa U-20 at the Charles J. Dempsey Football Academy in Auckland, finishing in an entertaining 3–3 draw. Star performers for Ngaruawahia included David Firisua and South African-born attacker Lance Louvie.

== Honours ==
- 1976 Cambridge Tournament runners-up
- 1998 Chatham Cup semi-finalists
- 2006 Northern League Division Two runners-up
- 2006 Cambridge Tournament runners-up
- 2007 Cambridge Tournament Plate winners
- 2008 Cambridge Tournament winners
- 2009 Promoted to Premier League
- 2011 Promoted to Division 1
- 2013 Promoted to Premier Division
- 2020 WaiBOP Premiership runners-up
- 2021 Cambridge Tournament winners
- 2021 Chatham Cup round of sixteen
- 2021 WaiBOP Premiership winners
- 2022 Promoted to Division 2
- 2022 Division 2 runners-up
- 2022 Winners of Division 2 U23 Division
- 2023 Promoted to Division 1
