= Matua, New Zealand =

Suburb of Tauranga, New Zealand

Matua
- Suburb
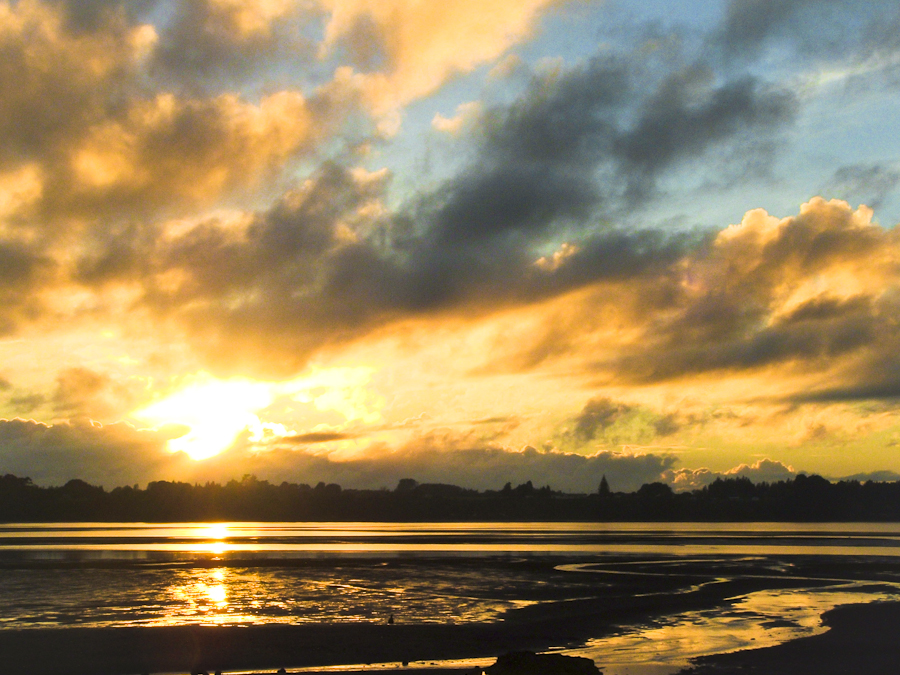
- Sunset on the Tauranga Harbour seen from Matua
- Interactive map of Matua
- Coordinates: 37.665376°S 176.131865°E
- Country: New Zealand
- City: Tauranga
- Local authority: Tauranga City Council
- Electoral ward: Matua-Otūmoetai General Ward

Area
  - Land: 244 ha (600 acres)

Population (June 2025)
  - Total: 5,620
  - Density: 2,300/km^{2} (5,970/sq mi)

(Tauranga Harbour)
Matua
Bellevue	Otūmoetai

Matua is a suburb of Tauranga, in the Bay of Plenty Region of New Zealand's North Island.

== Demographics ==
Matua covers 2.44 km^{2} (0.94 sq mi) and had an estimated population of 5,620 as of June 2025, with a population density of 2,303 people per km^{2}.

Historical population
Year	Pop.	±% p.a.
2006	5,076	—
2013	5,148	+0.20%
2018	5,391	+0.93%
2023	5,628	+0.86%

Matua had a population of 5,628 in the 2023 New Zealand census, an increase of 237 people (4.4%) since the 2018 census, and an increase of 480 people (9.3%) since the 2013 census. There were 2,715 males, 2,895 females, and 18 people of other genders in 2,079 dwellings. 2.2% of people identified as LGBTIQ+. The median age was 45.1 years (compared with 38.1 years nationally). There were 1,107 people (19.7%) aged under 15 years, 693 (12.3%) aged 15 to 29, 2,424 (43.1%) aged 30 to 64, and 1,407 (25.0%) aged 65 or older.

People could identify as more than one ethnicity. The results were 87.8% European (Pākehā); 10.9% Māori; 2.2% Pasifika; 6.6% Asian; 1.2% Middle Eastern, Latin American and African New Zealanders (MELAA); and 2.0% other, which includes people giving their ethnicity as "New Zealander". English was spoken by 97.7%, Māori by 2.5%, Samoan by 0.2%, and other languages by 9.8%. No language could be spoken by 1.7% (e.g. too young to talk). New Zealand Sign Language was known by 0.3%. The percentage of people born overseas was 24.7, compared with 28.8% nationally.

Religious affiliations were 32.8% Christian, 0.6% Hindu, 0.3% Islam, 0.4% Māori religious beliefs, 0.5% Buddhist, 0.4% New Age, 0.2% Jewish, and 1.2% other religions. People who answered that they had no religion were 56.0%, and 7.7% of people did not answer the census question.

Of those at least 15 years old, 1,338 (29.6%) people had a bachelor's or higher degree, 2,214 (49.0%) had a post-high school certificate or diploma, and 966 (21.4%) people exclusively held high school qualifications. The median income was $43,300, compared with $41,500 nationally. 684 people (15.1%) earned over $100,000 compared to 12.1% nationally. The employment status of those at least 15 was 2,025 (44.8%) full-time, 657 (14.5%) part-time, and 87 (1.9%) unemployed.

Individual statistical areas
Name	Area (km^{2})	Population	Density (per km^{2})	Dwellings	Median age	Median income
Matua North	1.24	3,024	2,943	1,134	45.0 years	$48,100
Matua South	1.20	2,604	2,170	948	45.3 years	$38,900
New Zealand					38.1 years	$41,500

== Education ==
Matua School is a co-educational state primary school for Year 1 to 6 students, with a roll of 521 as of July 2026. The school was established in 1965 as Levers Road School, and adopted its current name in 1966.
