= Papakura City FC =

Papakura City
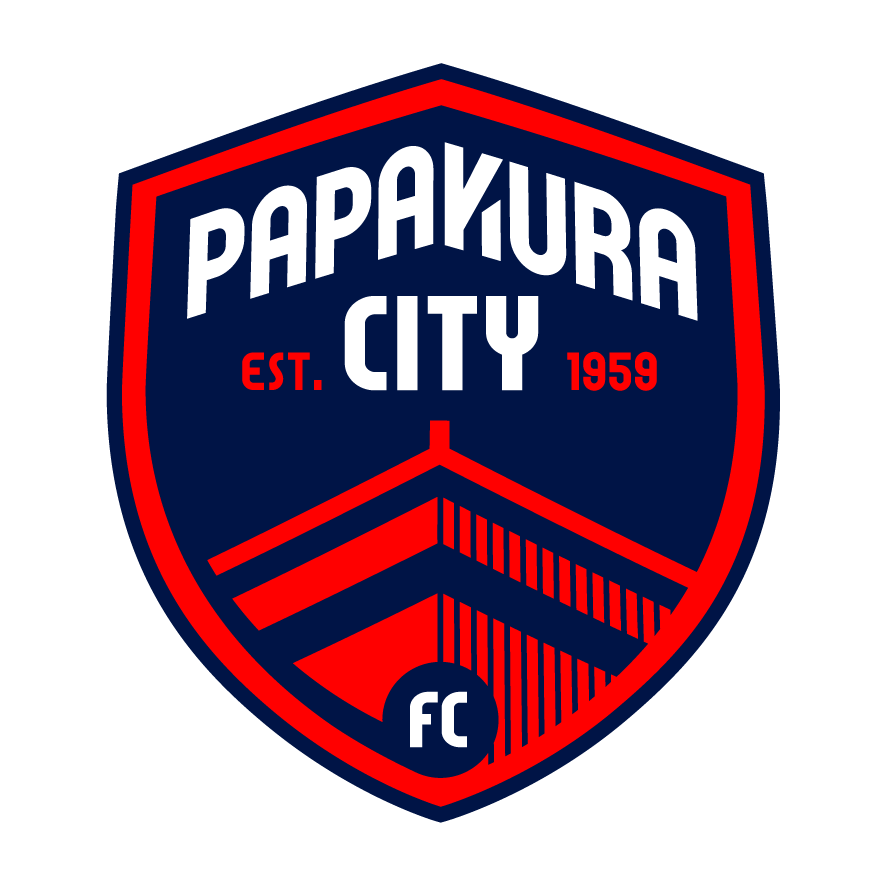
- Full name: Papakura City Football Club
- Nicknames: Papakura, Kura
- Founded: 1959
- Ground: McLennan Park, Papakura
- President: Natalie Yakas
- Coach: Tim Bodger
- League: NRF League One
- 2026: NRF League One, 4th of 8
Home colours	Away colours

Papakura City FC is a football (soccer) club based in Papakura, Auckland, New Zealand. The club currently competes in the NRF League One. The club also fields teams in all junior divisions, as well as a women's team that competes in the NRF League One Women division. Papakura play their home games at McLennan Park.

== Club history ==
The club was founded in 1959 as Papakura Town A.F.C. by Fred Edwards, George Sheppard and Peter Simmonds. The club initially adopted yellow and black colours and played their junior and youth matches at the fields located at the Papakura Army Camp, while McLennan Park in Papakura was being developed.

In 1964, the club was renamed Papakura A.F.C. and adopted blue and white as its primary colours. In 1975, coinciding with Papakura attaining city status, it became Papakura City A.F.C. and began a long-term lease of the lower ground at McLennan Park, which now serves as its senior match day pitch.

Facility development progressed with the completion of the lower clubroom in 1982, followed by the upper section in 1989. In the lead-up to the 2023 FIFA Women's World Cup, Papakura City hosted the Spain women's national football team for a ten-day training camp. The event prompted a NZ$1.4 million upgrade of the club’s facilities, including a new kitchen, modernised referees’ room, and clubhouse renovations, funded in part by the Wiri Licensing Trust. Spain went on to win the tournament, providing an inspirational experience for the club’s players, particularly its female members.

On the field, the club won the Men’s Northern League First Division in 2004 and reached the quarter-finals of the Chatham Cup in 2005. In 2006, it adopted its current name, Papakura City Football Club, and expanded to over 700 members. In 2019, Papakura City celebrated its 60th anniversary. The current membership exceeds 1,000, with 64 teams covering all age groups (junior and youth—boys and girls, senior men, and senior women).

Papakura City was the first club to be coached by future All Whites coach Ricki Herbert. Past and present internationals in the men’s squad have included Junior Bukalidi (Fiji), Apisai Smith (Fiji), Valerio Nawatu (Fiji), Nicholas Lawrence (Fiji), Daniel Billot (New Zealand U20s) and Harry Hillary-Jenkins (Papua New Guinea). Former club members to have achieved higher honours include Tim Payne (Wellington Phoenix FC and All Whites), Thomas Spragg (former New Zealand U-17 and U-20), and Alex Greive (San Antonio FC).

Building on the club's success across football codes, the women’s futsal side emerged as a national powerhouse in the 2020s. In 2023, the team retained the national Women’s Ford Futsal SuperLeague title, with Maxine Cooper netting the winning goal in extra time against WaiBOP Power in the final. In 2025, the Papakura City x NRF team reclaimed the national title, defeating Waikato Rapids 2–1 in a closely contested final. In the same campaign, Papakura City X NRF goalkeeper, Ashley Vincent, was awarded with the Golden Glove award.

== Honours ==
=== Men's ===
Year	Competition	Achievement
1971	Northern League Division Three	Champions
1972	Northern League Division Two	Champions
1991	Northern Premier League – Top Five	Runners-up
2004	Northern League Division One	Champions
2015	Northern League Division Two	Champions

=== Women’s ===
Year	Competition	Achievement
1981	AWFA Knockout Shield	Runners-up
1982	AWFA Knockout Shield	Runners-up
2023	Ford Futsal SuperLeague (Women)	Champions
2025	Ford Futsal SuperLeague (Women)	Champions
