= Claudelands Rovers =

New Zealand football club

- Full name: Claudelands Rovers Football Club
- Founded: 1923; 103 years ago
- Ground: Galloway Park, Hamilton East
- League: NRFL Southern Conference
- 2026: NRFL Southern Conference, 4th of 8 (relegated)
Home colours

Claudelands Rovers is a semi professional football club in New Zealand. It is based in the Hamilton suburb of Hamilton East.

== History ==
Claudelands Rovers Premier Men's Team plays in the NRFL Southern Conference. The club also fields an U-23 Northern League team as a reserve grade side, and men's teams in several WAIBOP Football competitions.

The club's women's team has previously won the Lotto Northern League Premier Women's competition, but in 2021 plays in the WAIBOP Football W-League competition.

In 2010 the Claudelands Rovers Premier Women won the New Zealand National Women's Knockout Cup, defeating Three Kings United in the final played at North Harbour Stadium.

The club also has a large junior program.

Kate Sheppard Cup
Preceded by Lynn-Avon United	Winner; 2010 Women's Knockout Cup	Succeeded by Glenfield Rovers
