= Ellerslie AFC =

- Full name: Ellerslie Association Football Club
- Nickname: The Ponies
- Founded: 1887 (Re-formed in 1953)
- Ground: Michaels Avenue Reserve, Ellerslie
- Chairman: Tim Adams
- Coach: Ben Fletcher (Men's) & Ryan Shiffman (Women's)
- League: NRFL Championship
- 2026: NRFL Championship, 11th of 12
Home colours	Away colours

Ellerslie AFC is an association football club based in Ellerslie, New Zealand. The senior men's team currently competes in the NRFL Championship. The senior women's team competes in the NRFL Premiership.

== Club history ==
Ellerslie AFC's history goes back to the original founding of the Auckland Football Association in 1887, whereby it was one of the seven clubs to participate in the Association's inaugural competition. The Club continued into the second season of organised soccer in Auckland, but, like the playing of the game at that time, did not continue past that point. Auckland football had slipped into a period of recess, due to the lack of suitable grounds, and Ellerslie became an early victim of the break in competition.

Come 1953 and the club was reformed through the efforts of a number of families. Enough members were gathered to form two senior teams in that first season, with games played at the Michaels Avenue ground, while training sessions took place at Ellerslie Domain, courtesy of the local rugby league club's generosity in lending the club the land for this purpose. Training sessions on a Thursday evening consisted of a full-scale match between the previous Saturday's first team and reserves, an encounter from which the coming Saturday's line-ups were selected by the coaches and the committee members. The club has been based at Michaels Ave ever since, which they share with Ellerslie Cricket Club.

== 2026 Squad ==
Note: Flags indicate national team as defined under FIFA eligibility rules; some limited exceptions apply. Players may hold more than one non-FIFA nationality.

No.	Pos.	Nation	Player
1	GK	NZL	Keegan Hansen
18	GK	NZL	Callum Roberson
2	DF	NZL	Ege Ozturk
3	DF	NZL	Seb Poelman
4	MF	NZL	Finn Rathbone
5	DF	NZL	Jack Rathbone
7	DF	POR	Darren Mota
11	FW	ENG	Ellis Breadmore
9	FW	NZL	Will Litchfield
8	MF	NZL	Jordan Oosterhof

== Honours ==
Men's Premier Team League Honours:

- Northern Premier League – 1993
- Country Foods Cup – runner-up 1986

Women's Premier Team League Honours:

- New Zealand Women's National League – qualification 2023
- Kate Sheppard Cup – winners 2001, runners-up 2002; 2003
- AWFA Knockout Shield – winners 1973, runners-up 1988; 1989

== Recent League positions - Men ==
- 2023 - Lotto NRFL Division 1 (7th)
- 2022 - Lotto NRFL Division 1 (7th)
- 2021 - Lotto NRFL Division 1 (10th) - cut short due to covid
- 2020 - Lotto NRFL Division 1 (10th) - cut short due to covid
- 2019 - Lotto NRFL Division 1 (10th)
- 2018 - Lotto NRFL Division 1 (7th)
- 2017 - Lotto NRFL Division 1 (10th)
- 2016 - Lotto NRFL Division 1 (6th)
- 2015 - Lotto NRFL Division 1 (4th)
- 2014 - Lotto NRFL Division 1 (5th)
- 2013 - Lotto NRFL Premier League (9th) - Relegated
- 2012 - Lotto NRFL Division 1 (2nd) - Promoted
- 2011 - Lotto NRFL Division 1 (4th)
- 2010 - Lotto NRFL Division 1 (1st)
- 2010 - Lotto NRFL Division 1B (4th)
- 2009 - Lotto NRFL Division 1 (6th)

== Recent League positions - Women ==
- 2023 - Lotto NRFL Premiership (4th)
- 2022 - Lotto NRFL Premiership (5th)
- 2021 - Lotto NRFL Premiership (5th) - cut short due to covid
- 2020 - Lotto NRFL Premiership (6th) - cut short due to covid
- 2019 - Lotto NRFL Championship (1st)

== Notable former players ==
The following former Ellerslie AFC players have represented New Zealand or Football Ferns at senior international level.

- (New Zealand) Michael Boxall
- (New Zealand) Fred de Jong
- (New Zealand) Dave Witteveen
- (New Zealand) Michael Ridenton
- (New Zealand) Andre de Jong
- (New Zealand) Myer Bevan
- (New Zealand) Milly Clegg

Preceded by Lynn-Avon United	Kate Sheppard Cup Winner; 2001	Succeeded by Lynn-Avon United
