= Albany United =

Albany United Football Club
- Full name: Albany United Football Club
- Nickname: Reds
- Founded: 1977
- Ground: Rosedale Park, Jack Hinton Drive, Albany
- Chairman: Garry Trewin
- Coach: Sergio Alva
- League: NRFL Northern Conference
- 2026: NRFL Northern Conference, 8th of 8
Home colours	Away colours

Albany United FC is a semi-professional association football club in Albany, New Zealand. They currently compete in the NRFL Northern Conference.

Established in 1977, Albany United Football Club is one of the largest sports clubs in the Albany Community.
