= Hibiscus Coast AFC =

Football club in New Zealand

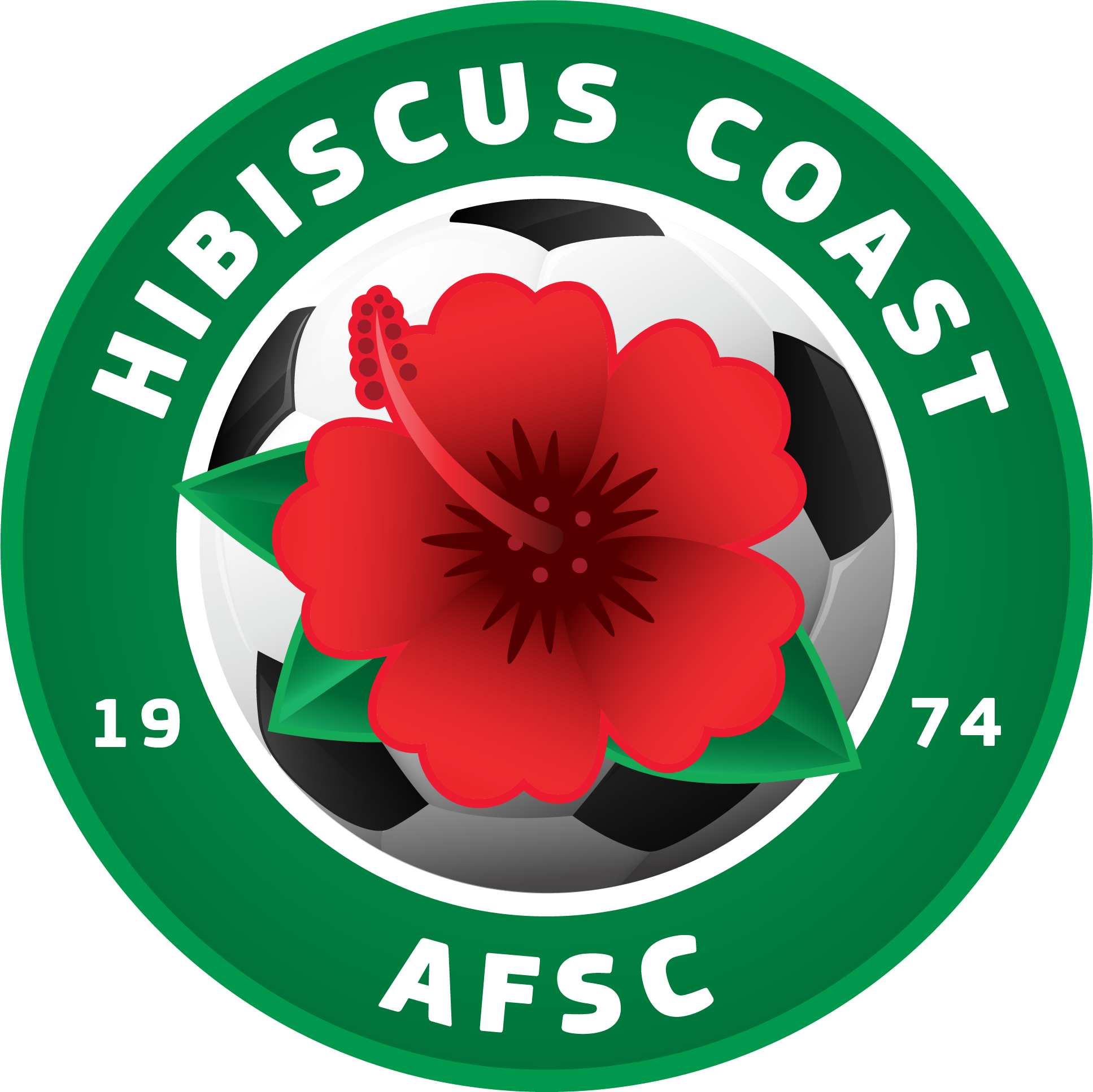
- Full name: Hibiscus Coast Association Football Club
- Nickname: The Coast
- Founded: 1974; 52 years ago
- Ground: Stanmore Bay Park, Whangaparaoa
- Chairman: Scott Beard
- Manager: Nathan Cranney
- League: Northern League
- 2026: NRFL Championship, 3rd of 12 (promoted)
Home colours	Away colours

Hibiscus Coast A.F.C is an amateur football club based in Stanmore Bay on the Whangaparāoa Peninsula, New Zealand. The club competes in the Northern League. The club was founded in 1974, and its home ground is located at Stanmore Bay Park, Whangaparaoa.

The club has one of the largest junior bases in Auckland, as well as being one of the few clubs to hold a Y-License accreditation (Youth Coaching license).

== History ==
Hibiscus Coast AFSC was first established in 1974 by Clarrie Morgan. The club holds an annual youth tournament named in his honour.

The club's men's first team mainly played in the fourth or third division in the Northern League from 1974 to 2003 when they were promoted to NRFL Division 2. They were then promoted to NRFL Division 1 in 2013 and would stay there until 2019 when they were relegated to Division 2.

In 2024, the club's 50th anniversary season, Hibiscus Coast AFC's men's team competed in the Lotto NRFL Championship (the second tier of Auckland competitive football), and the women's team in the Lotto NRFL Women's Premiership.

The club's most successful run in the New Zealand Chatham Cup was in 2024 when they made the quarter finals, drawing the home game 3-3, but ultimately losing 6-5 on penalties to Christchurch's Coastal Spirit FC.

== Colours and badge ==
Hibiscus Coast AFC's traditional home kit is a green shirt with white sleeves, accompanied by white shorts and socks. For the club's 50th anniversary season in 2024 the club opted to reverse these colours to a white shirt with green sleeves, green shorts and white socks. The shirt was created and designed by Dynasty Sports.

The crest shows a Hibiscus flower overlaying a classic football enclosed in circular emblem accompanied with the club's founding year (1974) and the club's name.

== Honours ==
League

Men's

- NRFL Division 2 Champions 2022
- NRFL Conference Champions 2012

Women's

- NRFL Championship Winners 2022
- NRF Carol Waller Cup Winners 2022
