= Tauranga City AFC =

- Full name: Tauranga City Association Football Club
- Nickname: 'The Blues'
- Founded: 1964
- Ground: Links Avenue, Mount Maunganui
- Chairman: Brendon McHugh
- Manager: Barry Gardiner
- League: Northern League
- 2026: Northern League, 10th of 12
- Website: https://tcafc.co.nz/
Home colours	Away colours

Tauranga City AFC is an association football club based in Tauranga, New Zealand. The men's team currently compete in the Northern League.

== Club history ==
Tauranga City AFC was formed in 1964, in 2000 they changed their name to Tauranga City United when Mt Maunganui AFC folded and the Tauranga City Council relocated the club to the formers ground at Links Avenue, Mt Maunganui. They dropped the United from their name again in 2017, returning to their original name ‘Tauranga City AFC’ when they merged with local junior side 'Mount Maunganui JFC’. Along with the merger the club also announced a new badge and a colour change from royal blue to sky blue.

Tauranga City AFC (TCAFC) is the only club in the ‘WaiBOP’ region to have an accredited New Zealand Football Talent Development Programme. This enables the club to have a full football pathway from its ‘Mini Blues’ (ages 4–6) to Senior football where they represent the Bay of Plenty in the Men's NRFL Division 1 and Women's NRFL Women's Championship.

In 2019, Tauranga City AFC was awarded Club of the Year for the WaiBOP region for its dedication to developing relationships with local schools and clubs to provide leading development programmes.

Tauranga City's best Chatham Cup season was in 2002, when they reached the final, only to be defeated by Napier City Rovers 2–0.

NRFL Division 1 honours 1985 Mount Maunganui United - Winners 1992 Tauranga City AFC - Winners 1998 Tauranga City AFC - Runners Up 2015 Tauranga City United - Runners Up

Tauranga City United played in the New Zealand National Soccer League in 2001, 2002 and 2003.

Tauranga City gained promotion from the NRFL Championship to the Northern League in the 2023 season.
