= Hamilton Wanderers AFC =

Hamilton Wanderers
- Full name: Hamilton Wanderers Association Football Club
- Founded: 1913; 113 years ago
- Ground: Porritt Stadium, Hamilton, New Zealand
- Capacity: 5,000
- Chairman: David Douglas
- Coach: Joseph Hinds
- League: NRFL Championship
- 2026: NRFL Championship, 5th of 12
- Website: hamiltonwanderers.co.nz
Home colours

Hamilton Wanderers Association Football Club is a semi-professional Association football club from Hamilton, New Zealand, that currently competes in the NRFL Championship.

== National League ==
Hamilton Wanderers joined the New Zealand Football Championship in 2016, following the dissolution of fellow Waikato club WaiBOP United, taking part in the 2016–17 season.

== Honours ==
- National Youth League
  - Champions (1): 2016
