= 2024 NRFL Leagues =

Football championship

NRFL Leagues
- Season: 2024

The 2024 NRFL Leagues is the 60th and 58th seasons respectively of the NRFL Championship and NRFL Conference, football competitions in New Zealand. Established in 1965, currently twelve teams compete in the championship while eight teams compete in the Northern and Southern sections of the Conference League.

The week the Northern League and NRFL Championship started, NRF announced changes to the competition structure for the 2024 season to accommodate Auckland FC. Auckland FC will have a reserves team playing in the qualifying and championship phases of the New Zealand National League from next season to fulfil their A-League Men requirements. To allow space for Auckland FC, the Northern League will now have a relegation play-off between the 10th place team and the runners up of the NRFL Championship for this season only. This also means an additional team will be relegated from the NRFL Championship and from the NRFL Conference leagues (with potential for further relegations to keep the conference leagues at 8 teams). New Zealand Football apologised for the late communication of decisions on 5 September 2024.

== Northern League ==
The Northern League sits above the two NRFL Divisions and is also overseen by Northern Region Football, despite being run by New Zealand Football as part of the New Zealand National League.

Twelve teams will compete in the league – the top ten teams from the previous season and the two teams promoted from the 2023 Championship. The promoted teams are Tauranga City and East Coast Bays. This is both Tauranga's and East Coast Bay's first season in the Northern League. They replaced Takapuna (two seasons) and Manukau United (three seasons).

=== Northern League table ===
Pos	Team	Pld	W	D	L	GF	GA	GD	Pts	Qualification
1	Auckland City (C)	22	16	3	3	53	21	+32	51	Winner of Northern League and qualification to National League Championship
2	Western Springs	22	14	4	4	52	30	+22	46	Qualification to National League Championship
3	Eastern Suburbs	22	14	2	6	38	20	+18	44	Qualification to National League Championship
4	Birkenhead United	22	13	4	5	54	31	+23	43	Qualification to National League Championship
5	Auckland United	22	12	4	6	39	27	+12	40	
6	Bay Olympic	22	9	1	12	39	42	−3	28	
7	Tauranga City	22	7	4	11	38	56	−18	25	
8	West Coast Rangers	22	6	5	11	28	45	−17	23	
9	East Coast Bays	22	5	7	10	29	38	−9	22	
10	Manurewa (O)	22	5	4	13	41	56	−15	19	Qualification for the relegation play-offs
11	Melville United (R)	22	6	0	16	29	54	−25	18	Relegation to NRFL Championship
12	Hamilton Wanderers (R)	22	2	8	12	28	48	−20	14	Relegation to NRFL Championship

Source: NRF
Rules for classification: 1) Points; 2) Goal difference; 3) Goals scored; 4) Goals against; 5) Head to head; 6) Disciplinary record; 7) Coin toss
(C) Champions; (O) Play-off winners; (R) Relegated

== Championship ==
NRFL Championship
- Season: 2024
- Dates: 23 March 2024 – 31 August 2024
- Champions: Fencibles United
- Promoted: Fencibles United
- Relegated: Metro; Franklin United
- Matches: 132
- Goals: 521 (3.95 per match)
- Top goalscorer: Darius Palma (24 goals)
- Biggest home win: Fencibles United 13–2 Franklin United (20 July 2024)
- Biggest away win: Franklin United 0–10 Fencibles United (13 April 2024)
- Highest scoring: Fencibles United 13–2 Franklin United (20 July 2024)

Each team can field a maximum of five foreign players as well as one additional foreign player who has Oceania Football Confederation nationality. Over the course of the season, each team must also ensure players aged 20 or under account for 7% of available playing minutes.

=== Championship teams ===
Twelve teams are competing in the league – nine teams from the previous season, the two teams relegated from the 2023 Northern League and one team promoted from the NRFL Conference. The relegated teams were Takapuna and Manukau United, while the promoted team is Franklin United. Tauranga City were promoted alongside East Coast Bays, while Waiheke United were relegated.

Team	Location	Stadium	2023 season
Ellerslie	Ellerslie, Auckland	Michaels Avenue	7th
Franklin United	Drury	Drury Sports Grounds	1st in Northern Conference (promoted via play-offs)
Fencibles United	Pakuranga, Auckland	Riverhills Domain	8th
Hibiscus Coast	Whangaparāoa, Auckland	Stanmore Bay Park	6th
Manukau United	Māngere East, Auckland	Centre Park	12th in Northern League (relegated)
Metro	Mount Albert, Auckland	Phyllis Street	11th
Mount Albert-Ponsonby	Mount Albert, Auckland	Anderson Park	4th
Ngaruawahia United	Ngāruawāhia	Centennial Park, Ngāruawāhia	3rd
North Shore United	Devonport, Auckland	Allen Hill Stadium	5th
Northern Rovers	Glenfield, Auckland	McFetridge Park	9th
Onehunga-Mangere United	Māngere Bridge, Auckland	Māngere Domain	10th
Takapuna	Takapuna, Auckland	Taharoto Park	11th in Northern League (relegated)

=== Championship personnel and kits ===
Team	Manager	Captain	Kit manufacturer	Shirt sponsor
Ellerslie	Ben Fletcher	Seb Poelman	Lotto Sport Italia	None
Fencibles United	(New Zealand) Rhys Ruka		Nike	New World Howick
Franklin United	Tashreeq Davids		Lotto Sport Italia	Frame Homes
Hibiscus Coast	(New Zealand) Ryan Faithfull		Dynasty Sport	Barfoot & Thompson
Manukau United	Gordon Paulsen		Joma	Munchy Mart
Metro	Neil Sykes		Nike	None
Mount Albert-Ponsonby	(New Zealand) Darren White	Lewis Black	Lotto Sport Italia	Woodview Construction
Ngaruawahia United	Kyle Park	(England) Jordan Boon	Joma	None
North Shore United	Dave Fahy	(New Zealand) Harry Lissington	Nike	Atlas Concrete
Northern Rovers	(New Zealand) Daniel Donegan		Lotto Sport Italia	Edge Mortgages
Onehunga-Mangere United	(New Zealand) Paul Marshall		Nike	None
Takapuna	(New Zealand) Daniel Semp		Lotto Sport Italia	Harcourts Cooper & Co

=== Championship table ===
Pos	Team	Pld	W	D	L	GF	GA	GD	Pts	Qualification
1	Fencibles United (C, P)	22	16	3	3	75	29	+46	51	Promotion to Northern League
2	Manukau United	22	13	5	4	51	26	+25	44	Qualification for promotion play-offs
3	Ngaruawahia United	22	12	3	7	62	33	+29	39	
4	Hibiscus Coast	22	10	6	6	32	25	+7	36	
5	Northern Rovers	22	9	8	5	42	32	+10	35	
6	Onehunga-Mangere United	22	9	3	10	42	42	0	30	
7	Ellerslie	22	9	2	11	44	41	+3	29	
8	Mount Albert-Ponsonby	22	7	5	10	47	51	−4	26	
9	North Shore United	22	7	5	10	37	42	−5	26	
10	Takapuna	22	6	8	8	33	42	−9	26	
11	Metro (R)	22	5	7	10	37	46	−9	22	Relegation to NRFL Northern Conference
12	Franklin United (R)	22	1	1	20	19	112	−93	4	Relegation to NRFL Northern Conference

Source: Northern Region Football
Rules for classification: 1) Points; 2) Goal difference; 3) Goals scored; 4) Goals against; 5) Head to head; 6) Disciplinary record; 7) Coin toss
(C) Champions; (P) Promoted; (R) Relegated

=== Championship results table ===
Home \ Away	ELL	FEN	FRA	HBC	MAN	MET	MAP	NGA	NSU	NTR	OHM	TAK
Ellerslie	—	1–2	7–0	3–1	1–5	5–1	2–1	0–2	2–0	0–1	3–2	0–2
Fencibles United	5–3	—	13–2	2–4	3–1	1–1	3–1	1–0	4–0	2–4	2–6	5–1
Franklin United	0–1	0–10	—	0–2	0–2	4–3	3–5	0–5	0–7	0–5	2–6	1–1
Hibiscus Coast	2–0	1–0	6–1	—	1–2	1–1	0–0	1–1	1–0	2–1	1–4	0–0
Manukau United	3–2	2–2	5–0	1–0	—	2–2	2–4	3–1	3–0	1–1	1–0	4–1
Metro	2–2	1–4	3–0	2–2	3–1	—	4–1	1–3	3–0	2–3	0–2	0–4
Mount Albert-Ponsonby	3–5	0–4	6–2	1–2	3–3	0–0	—	1–4	3–3	2–1	1–1	5–0
Ngaruawahia United	3–0	1–2	8–0	2–3	2–1	5–1	4–2	—	2–5	1–2	1–2	2–2
North Shore United	1–0	1–3	6–1	1–0	0–3	1–1	2–1	1–6	—	1–1	1–1	0–0
Northern Rovers	3–1	1–1	4–2	0–0	0–0	2–1	0–2	2–3	4–3	—	2–3	1–1
Onehunga-Mangere United	0–4	0–2	4–0	0–1	0–5	1–4	5–2	0–3	1–3	3–3	—	3–0 (Note: Match originally finished 2–2, but Takapuna fielded too many non-citizen players. Onehunga-Mangere awarded a 3–0 win.)
Takapuna	2–2	3–4	3–1	3–1	0–1	2–1	1–3	3–3	2–1	1–1	1–3	—

Source: UltimateNZSoccer
Legend: Blue = home team win; Yellow = draw; Red = away team win.

=== Championship scoring ===
==== Championship top scorers ====
Rank	Player	Club	Goals
1	(England) Darius Palma	Ngaruawahia United	24
2	(England) Daniel Bunch	Fencibles United	16
2	(New Zealand) Kodie Nicol	Fencibles United	16
4	(New Zealand) Adam Creaney	Metro	15
5	(New Zealand) Reuben Henderson	Ngaruawahia United	12
6	(New Zealand) Aston Burns	Fencibles United	11
6	(New Zealand) Dylan Horgan	Manukau United	11
6	(New Zealand) Nick Petherick	Takapuna / North Shore United	11
6	(New Zealand) Meysum Shafahi	Manukau United	11
10	(Portugal) João Moreira	Takapuna	10
10	(New Zealand) Brodie Putt	North Shore United	10

== Northern Conference ==
NRFL Northern Conference
- Season: 2024
- Dates: 29 March 2024 - 7 September 2024
- Champions: Waiheke United
- Relegated: Waiheke United; Te Atatu; Oratia United

=== Northern Conference teams ===
Eight teams are competing in the league – five teams from the previous season, the team relegated from the 2023 Championship and the champions of the 2023 NRF League One. The relegated team is Waiheke United, while the promoted team is Te Atatu. Franklin United were promoted as winners of the conference play-off, while West Auckland and Central United were relegated.

Team	Location	Stadium	2023 season
Albany United	Albany, Auckland	Rosedale Park	6th
Beachlands Maraetai	Beachlands, Auckland	Te Puru Park	5th
Bucklands Beach	Bucklands Beach	Lloyd Elsmore Park	2nd
Northland	Morningside, Whangārei	Morningside Park	7th
Oratia United	Oratia, Auckland	Parrs Park	3rd
Te Atatu	Te Atatū Peninsula, Auckland	Te Atatū Peninsula Park	1st in NRF League One (promoted)
Waiheke United	Waiheke Island, Auckland	Onetangi Sports Park	12th in Championship (relegated)
Waitemata	Te Atatū South, Auckland	McLeod Park	4th

=== Northern Conference table ===
Pos	Team	Pld	W	D	L	GF	GA	GD	Pts	Qualification
1	Waiheke United (Note: Withdrew from the NRFL Conference before the season commenced.) (C)	21	15	3	3	54	22	+32	46 (Note: Waiheke United were deducted two points for failing to have a coach with the correct coaching license in their match against Albany United on 15 June 2024.)	Qualification for Conference play-offs
2	Waitemata	21	14	3	4	50	31	+19	45	
3	Northland	20	12	2	6	46	33	+13	38	
4	Albany United	21	12	0	9	38	35	+3	36	
5	Bucklands Beach	20	9	2	9	43	34	+9	29	
6	Beachlands Maraetai (Note: Due to Auckland FC's reserve team entering the 2025 Northern League, additional relegations were required to keep the league balanced at 8 teams.)	21	6	1	14	42	64	−22	19	
7	Te Atatu (R)	21	4	5	12	31	43	−12	17	Relegation to NRF League One
8	Oratia United (R)	21	1	4	16	17	59	−42	7	Relegation to NRF League One

Source: Northern Region Football
Rules for classification: 1) Points; 2) Goal difference; 3) Goals scored; 4) Goals against; 5) Head to head; 6) Disciplinary record; 7) Coin toss
(C) Champions; (R) Relegated
Notes:
- The final game between Bucklands Beach and Northland was cancelled, with neither team being able to change league positions regardless of result.

=== Northern Conference results table ===
Home \ Away	ALB	BLM	BUC	NOR	ORA	TAT	WHU	WTM	ALB	BLM	BUC	NOR	ORA	TAT	WHU	WTM
Albany United	—	4–5	2–0	3–2	2–1	3–2	2–1	1–3	—	3–1	—	—	—	0–2	1–5	—
Beachlands Maraetai	1–4	—	1–4	1–4	2–2	1–3	2–4	2–3	—	—	3–1	0–3	2–0	—	—	—
Bucklands Beach	2–0	5–0	—	2–3	4–1	6–1	3–2	2–4	0–1	—	—	C (Note: The final game between Bucklands Beach and Northland was cancelled, with neither team being able to change league positions regardless of result)	3–1	—	—	—
Northland	0–2	3–2	4–5	—	4–1	3–2	0–2	3–0	2–1	—	—	—	2–0	—	0–4	3–1
Oratia United	1–4	1–5	0–0	0–4	—	1–5	0–3	2–5	0–1	—	—	—	—	1–0	2–5	0–2
Te Atatu	1–2	3–4	2–0	2–3	2–2	—	1–1	1–2	—	0–2	2–2	1–1	—	—	—	0–0
Waiheke United	1–0	2–1	2–0	2–0	1–1	4–1	—	5–2	—	4–3	2–1	—	—	3–0	—	—
Waitemata	2–1	4–1	2–1	2–2	3–0	2–0	1–1	—	3–1	7–3	1–2	—	—	—	1–0	—

Updated to match(es) played on 7 September 2024. Source: UltimateNZSoccer
Legend: Blue = home team win; Yellow = draw; Red = away team win.

==== Northern Conference scoring ====
As of Completed as of 14 September 2024

===== Northern Conference top scorers =====
Rank	Player	Club	Goals
1	Sander Waterland	Bucklands Beach	18
2	Mark Giles	Beachlands Maraetai	17
3	James Chamberlain-Barlow	Albany United	11
4	Fumiya Ito	Northland	10
4	Nicolas Federico Vanina	Waiheke United	10
6	Kyle Levell	Northland	9
6	Harry Murphy	Waitemata	9
8	Joshua Smith	Bucklands Beach	8
8	Adam Hargood	Waitemata	8
10	Alex Thurbon	Beachlands Marartai	7
10	Diego Sepúlveda Carvajal	Waiheke United	7
10	Arnold Kochasira	Waitemata	7

== Southern Conference ==
NRFL Southern Conference
- Season: 2024
- Dates: 29 March 2024 - 31 August 2024
- Champions: Cambridge
- Promoted: Cambridge
- Relegated: Waikato Unicol; Te Awamutu

=== Southern Conference teams ===
Eight teams are competing in the league – the same eight teams from the previous season. No side were promoted from WaiBOP League One as Tauranga City won the league and couldn't be promoted, due to their first team being in an NRFL league.

Team	Location	Stadium	2023 season
Cambridge	Cambridge	John Kerkhof Park	2nd
Claudelands Rovers	Claudelands, Hamilton	Galloway Park	4th
Ngongotahā Lakes (Note: Ngongotaha AFC signed a Memorandum of Understanding with Lakes FC at the end of the 2022 season to have a combined team for the 2023 season onwards.)	Ngongotahā, Rotorua	Tamarahi Reserve	7th
Otumoetai	Matua, Tauranga	Fergusson Park	6th
Papamoa	Papamoa Beach, Papamoa	Gordon Spratt Reserve	5th
Taupo	Tauhara, Taupō	Crown Park	3rd
Te Awamutu	Te Awamutu	The Stadium	8th
Waikato Unicol	Silverdale, Hamilton	Jansen Park	1st

=== Southern Conference table ===
Pos	Team	Pld	W	D	L	GF	GA	GD	Pts	Qualification
1	Cambridge (C, P)	21	21	0	0	122	21	+101	63	Qualification for Conference play-offs
2	Taupo	21	12	3	6	69	29	+40	39	
3	Claudelands Rovers	21	12	2	7	59	44	+15	38	
4	Otumoetai	21	10	2	9	47	52	−5	32	
5	Waikato Unicol (R)	21	8	2	11	39	64	−25	26	Withdrew before the 2025 season (Note: Waikato Unicol withdrew in December 2024 and were replaced by West Hamilton United.)
6	Papamoa	21	6	4	11	39	47	−8	22	
7	Ngongotahā Lakes	21	6	1	14	29	77	−48	19	
8	Te Awamutu (R)	21	0	4	17	20	90	−70	4	Relegation to WaiBOP League One

Source: Northern Region Football
Rules for classification: 1) Points; 2) Goal difference; 3) Goals scored; 4) Goals against; 5) Head to head; 6) Disciplinary record; 7) Coin toss
(C) Champions; (P) Promoted; (R) Relegated

=== Southern Conference results table ===
Home \ Away	CAM	CLR	NGO	OTU	PAP	TAU	TAW	WKU	CAM	CLR	NGO	OTU	PAP	TAU	TAW	WKU
Cambridge	—	4–3	5–0	6–1	2–1	5–1	9–0	8–1	—	5–2	3–1	13–0	5–0	—	—	—
Claudelands Rovers	3–9	—	7–1	1–1	2–1	2–0	6–0	4–2	—	—	5–0	1–2	—	—	—	2–1
Ngongotahā Lakes	0–8	1–3	—	2–5	2–6	0–7	2–1	4–2	—	—	—	1–2	2–1	1–6	—	—
Otumoetai	0–2	0–1	1–2	—	1–2	2–2	4–1	1–0	—	—	—	—	3–2	1–4	—	4–3
Papamoa	0–6	1–3	2–3	2–1	—	2–1	5–0	3–4	—	1–3	—	—	—	1–1	2–0	2–3
Taupo	3–4	5–0	6–0	4–2	2–2	—	3–0	2–0	0–1	3–2	—	—	—	—	8–0	0–2
Te Awamutu	1–4	2–5	2–4	2–7	0–0	2–6	—	1–2	1–10	3–3	0–0	0–5	—	—	—	—
Waikato Unicol	1–7	2–1	1–0	1–4	3–3	0–5	2–2	—	2–6	—	4–3	—	—	—	3–2	—

Updated to match(es) played on 7 September 2024. Source: UltimateNZSoccer
Legend: Blue = home team win; Yellow = draw; Red = away team win.

==== Southern Conference scoring ====
As of 7 September 2024

===== Southern Conference top scorers =====
Rank	Player	Club	Goals
1	Jack Connor	Cambridge	32
2	Kirshaant Singh	Claudelands Rovers	25
3	Joshua Clarkin	Cambridge	24
4	Joe O'Donoghue	Taupo	19
5	Bailey Webster	Cambridge	17
6	Jack Boland	Otumoetai	15
7	Rahim Nabizada	Cambridge	14
8	Henry Stephen	Claudelands Rovers	10
8	Abdul Sulieman	Waikato Unicol	10
10	Steffano Riley	Ngongotaha Lakes	9
10	Andrew Cooper	Papamoa	9
10	Ty Christensen	Taupo	9

== Conference play-offs ==
The conference play-offs took place on 14 and 21 September 2024.

=== Overview ===
Team 1	Agg.	Team 2	1st leg	2nd leg
Cambridge (S)	2–0	Waiheke United (N)	1–0	1–0

=== Matches ===
14 September 2024
15:00 NZST

Cambridge	1–0	Waiheke United
Connor 5'	Report

John Kerkhof Park, Cambridge
Referee: Andy Holdsworth
21 September 2024
14:00 NZST

Waiheke United	0–1	Cambridge
	Report	Nabizada 66'

Onetangi Sports Park, Waiheke Island
Referee: Nick Kang

Cambridge won 2–0 on aggregate and was promoted to NRFL Championship.

== Women's Premiership ==
The NRFL Women's Premiership acts as a qualifier for the New Zealand Women's National League.

Eight teams are competing in the league – the top seven teams from the previous season and the promoted side from the 2023 NRFL Championship. The promoted team is Franklin United as winners of the NRFL Championship. They replaced Northern Rovers.

=== Women's Premiership table ===
Pos	Team	Pld	W	D	L	GF	GA	GD	Pts	Qualification
1	Auckland United (C)	21	19	2	0	65	9	+56	59	Winner of NRFL Premiership and qualification to National League Championship
2	West Coast Rangers	21	16	1	4	65	29	+36	49	Qualification to National League Championship
3	Eastern Suburbs	21	10	1	10	39	29	+10	31	Qualification to National League Championship
4	Western Springs	21	9	3	9	38	31	+7	30	Qualification to National League Championship
5	Fencibles United	21	8	2	11	26	41	−15	26	
6	Hibiscus Coast	21	7	3	11	30	44	−14	24	
7	Ellerslie	21	4	4	13	21	48	−27	16	
8	Hamilton Wanderers (R)	21	2	2	17	14	67	−53	8	Relegation to NRFL Women's Championship

Source: Northern Region Football
Rules for classification: 1) Points; 2) Goal difference; 3) Goals scored; 4) Goals against; 5) Head to head; 6) Disciplinary record; 7) Coin toss
(C) Champions; (R) Relegated

== Women's Championship ==
NRFL Women's Championship
- Season: 2024
- Dates: 7 April 2024 – 7 September 2024
- Champions: FC Tauranga Moana
- Promoted: FC Tauranga Moana
- Relegated: Manukau United

=== Women's Championship teams ===
Eight teams are competing in the league – five teams from the previous season, the one team relegated from the 2023 NRFL Premiership, Northern Rovers, and one team promoted from each of the NRF Women's Conference and the WaiBOP W-League. The promoted teams are Birkenhead United and Melville United. Franklin United were promoted, while Te Atatu were relegated. Tauranga City and Otumoetai merged along with Papamoa to form FC Tauranga Moana.

Team	Location	Stadium	2023 season
Birkenhead United	Beach Haven, Auckland	Shepherds Park	1st in NRF Women's Conference (promoted) (Note: Birkenhead United lost the promotion play-off to Melville United originally missing out on promotion. As Tauranga City and Otumoetai merged, Birkenhead United were awarded the remaining spot.)
Central United	Sandringham	Kiwitea Street	7th
FC Tauranga Moana	Mount Maunganui, Tauranga	Links Avenue	4th (Note: Tauranga City finished 4th in 2023, merging with Otumoetai who finished 5th, and Papamoa FC, to form FC Tauranga Moana.)
Franklin United	Drury	Drury Sports Grounds	3rd
Manukau United	Māngere East, Auckland	Centre Park	6th
Melville United	Melville, Hamilton	Gower Park	1st in WaiBOP W League (promoted via play-offs)
Northern Rovers	Glenfield, Auckland	McFetridge Park	8th in NRFL Women's Premiership (relegated)
Onehunga Sports	Onehunga, Auckland	Waikaraka Park	2nd

=== Women's Championship table ===
Pos	Team	Pld	W	D	L	GF	GA	GD	Pts	Qualification
1	FC Tauranga Moana (C, P)	21	17	3	1	96	26	+70	54	Promotion to NRFL Women's Premiership
2	Franklin United	21	16	2	3	89	36	+53	50	
3	Onehunga Sports	21	12	2	7	66	38	+28	38	
4	Melville United	20	9	3	8	43	44	−1	30	
5	Birkenhead United	20	8	4	8	29	34	−5	28	
6	Northern Rovers	21	6	3	12	32	44	−12	21	
7	Central United	21	5	2	14	30	58	−28	17	
8	Manukau United (R)	21	0	1	20	13	118	−105	1	Relegation to NRF Women's League One

Source: Northern Region Football
Rules for classification: 1) Points; 2) Goal difference; 3) Goals scored; 4) Goals against; 5) Head to head; 6) Disciplinary record; 7) Coin toss
(C) Champions; (P) Promoted; (R) Relegated
- The final game between Melville United and Birkenhead United was cancelled.

=== Women's Championship results table ===
Home \ Away	BIR	CEN	TGM	FRA	MAN	MEL	NTR	OHS	BIR	CEN	TGM	FRA	MAN	MEL	NTR	OHS
Birkenhead United	—							1–0	—							
Central United		—								—						
FC Tauranga Moana			—			3–1					—					
Franklin United				—								—				
Manukau United		3–3			—								—			
Melville United						—								—		
Northern Rovers				3–6			—								—	
Onehunga Sports								—								—

Updated to match(es) played on 7 April 2024. Source: Northern Region Football
Legend: Blue = home team win; Yellow = draw; Red = away team win.
