= 2025 NRFL Leagues =

Football championship

NRFL Leagues
- Season: 2025

The 2025 NRFL Leagues was the 61st and 59th seasons respectively of the NRFL Championship and NRFL Conference, football competitions in New Zealand. Established in 1965, currently twelve teams compete in the Championship while 8 teams compete in the Northern and Southern sections of the Conference League.

== Northern League ==
The Northern League sits above the two NRFL Divisions and is also overseen by Northern Region Football, despite being run by New Zealand Football as part of the New Zealand National League.

Twelve teams are competing in the league – the top ten teams from the previous season, one team promoted from the NRFL Championship and Auckland FC Reserves. The promoted team is Fencibles United. It is both Auckland FC Reserves's and Fencibles United's first season in the National League. They replaced Melville United and Hamilton Wanderers (both relegated after a four-year Northern League spell).

=== Northern League table ===
Pos	Team	Pld	W	D	L	GF	GA	GD	Pts	Qualification
1	Western Springs (C)	22	13	3	6	44	30	+14	42	Winner of Northern League and qualification to National League Championship
2	Birkenhead United	22	12	5	5	55	33	+22	41	Qualification to National League Championship
3	Auckland United	22	12	4	6	47	32	+15	40	Qualification to National League Championship
4	Auckland City	22	12	4	6	35	24	+11	40	Qualification to National League Championship
5	Eastern Suburbs	22	12	4	6	35	27	+8	40	
6	East Coast Bays	22	10	6	6	32	27	+5	36	
7	Tauranga City	22	9	3	10	42	38	+4	30	
8	Bay Olympic	22	6	6	10	26	36	−10	24	
9	Auckland FC Reserves (Note: Auckland FC Reserves gain automatic entry into the National League Championship phase and cannot be relegated due to the A-League Men requirements.)	22	6	5	11	33	37	−4	23	Qualification to National League Championship
10	Fencibles United	22	5	6	11	37	49	−12	21	
11	Manurewa (R)	22	4	4	14	24	57	−33	16	Relegation to NRFL Championship
12	West Coast Rangers (R)	22	3	6	13	26	46	−20	15	Relegation to NRFL Championship

Source: NRF
Rules for classification: 1) Points; 2) Goal difference; 3) Goals scored; 4) Goals against; 5) Head to head; 6) Disciplinary record; 7) Coin toss
(C) Champions; (R) Relegated

== Championship ==
NRFL Championship
- Season: 2025
- Dates: 22 March 2025 – 30 August 2025
- Champions: Manukau United
- Promoted: Manukau United; Melville United
- Relegated: Ngaruawahia United

Each team can field a maximum of five foreign players as well as one additional foreign player who has Oceania Football Confederation nationality. Over the course of the season, each team must also ensure players aged 20 or under account for 7% of available playing minutes.

=== Championship teams ===
Twelve teams are competing in the league – nine teams from the previous season, the two teams relegated from the 2024 Northern League and one team promoted from the NRFL Conference. The relegated teams were Melville United and Hamilton Wanderers, while the promoted team is Cambridge. Fencibles United were promoted, while Metro and Franklin United were relegated.

Team	Location	Stadium	2024 season
Cambridge	Cambridge	John Kerkhof Park	1st in Southern Conference (promoted via play-offs)
Ellerslie	Ellerslie, Auckland	Michaels Avenue	7th
Hamilton Wanderers	Chartwell, Hamilton	Porritt Stadium	12th in Northern League (relegated)
Hibiscus Coast	Whangaparaoa, Auckland	Stanmore Bay Park	4th
Manukau United	Māngere East, Auckland	Centre Park	2nd
Melville United	Hamilton Lake, Hamilton	Gower Park	11th in Northern League (relegated)
Mount Albert-Ponsonby	Mount Albert, Auckland	Anderson Park	8th
Ngaruawahia United	Ngāruawāhia	Centennial Park, Ngāruawāhia	3rd
North Shore United	Devonport, Auckland	Allen Hill Stadium	9th
Northern Rovers	Glenfield, Auckland	McFetridge Park	5th
Onehunga-Mangere United	Māngere Bridge, Auckland	Māngere Domain	6th
Takapuna	Takapuna, Auckland	Taharoto Park	10th

=== Championship personnel and kits ===
Team	Manager	Captain	Kit manufacturer	Shirt sponsor
Cambridge	(New Zealand) Jordan Shaw		Lotto Sport Italia	Wash 'N' Dry
Ellerslie	(New Zealand) Ben Fletcher	Seb Poelman	Lotto Sport Italia	None
Hamilton Wanderers	(Wales) Joseph Hinds		Dynasty Sport	Bayleys
Hibiscus Coast	(New Zealand) Nathan Cranney		Dynasty Sport	Barfoot & Thompson
Manukau United			Joma	Munchy Mart
Melville United	(New Zealand) Jarrod Young		Joma	NZ Roadside Assistance
Mount Albert-Ponsonby	(New Zealand) Sammy Negash	Lewis Black	Lotto Sport Italia	Woodview Construction
Ngaruawahia United	(New Zealand) Mark Cossey		Joma	None
North Shore United	(New Zealand) Dave Fahy		Nike	Atlas Concrete
Northern Rovers	(New Zealand) Daniel Donegan		Lotto Sport Italia	Edge Mortgages
Onehunga-Mangere United	(New Zealand) Paul Marshall		Nike	None
Takapuna	(New Zealand) Daniel Semp		Lotto Sport Italia	Harcourts Cooper & Co

=== Championship table ===
Pos	Team	Pld	W	D	L	GF	GA	GD	Pts	Qualification
1	Manukau United (C, P)	22	14	2	6	51	26	+25	44	Promotion to Northern League
2	Melville United (P)	22	13	4	5	43	24	+19	43	Promotion to Northern League
3	Northern Rovers	22	13	3	6	55	32	+23	42	
4	Cambridge	22	12	6	4	46	27	+19	42	
5	Hamilton Wanderers	22	13	2	7	47	30	+17	41	
6	Hibiscus Coast	22	10	5	7	29	24	+5	35	
7	Onehunga-Mangere United	22	8	4	10	30	30	0	28	
8	North Shore United	22	8	3	11	29	36	−7	27	
9	Ellerslie	22	6	6	10	48	56	−8	24	
10	Takapuna	22	7	3	12	30	38	−8	24	
11	Mount Albert-Ponsonby	22	6	2	14	26	52	−26	20	
12	Ngaruawahia United (R)	22	1	2	19	20	79	−59	5	Relegation to NRFL Southern Conference

Source: Northern Region Football
Rules for classification: 1) Points; 2) Goal difference; 3) Goals scored; 4) Goals against; 5) Head to head; 6) Disciplinary record; 7) Coin toss
(C) Champions; (P) Promoted; (R) Relegated

=== Championship results table ===
Home \ Away	CAM	ELL	HAM	HBC	MAN	MEL	MAP	NGA	NSU	NTR	OMU	TAK
Cambridge	—	3–1	2–1	3–2	3–3	1–1	4–1	4–0	1–3	1–1	3–0	2–1
Ellerslie	3–3	—	1–2	1–1	4–2	2–1	6–2	5–4	1–3	1–3	0–3	3–3
Hamilton Wanderers	1–2	3–3	—	4–0	1–2	2–2	4–1	2–0	3–1	4–2	2–0	3–2
Hibiscus Coast	0–1	1–1	1–0	—	0–1	0–3	3–0	4–0	2–1	2–1	1–0	2–1
Manukau United	1–0	5–0	2–4	4–2	—	1–2	3–0	6–0	2–1	5–0	2–3	1–0
Melville United	1–1	2–0	3–0	2–1	1–5	—	3–0	7–1	2–1	1–3	1–0	2–0
Mount Albert-Ponsonby	1–3	2–1	2–1	0–0	0–1	2–1	—	4–1	4–0	0–5	1–3	0–3
Ngaruawahia United	0–4	4–2	0–4	0–3	1–2	0–3	0–2	—	1–2	2–5	1–1	2–3
North Shore United	2–0	3–2	0–2	1–1	1–0	0–1	3–1	3–3	—	2–1	0–2	0–2
Northern Rovers	2–1	5–5	1–2	0–2	3–1	1–1	2–1	5–0	2–1	—	3–0	3–0
Onehunga-Mangere United	2–2	1–3	2–0	0–0	0–2	1–2	4–1	4–0	0–0	0–2	—	2–3
Takapuna	0–2	0–3	1–2	0–1	0–0	2–1	1–1	4–0	3–1	0–5	1–2	—

First match(es) will be played: 22 March 2025. Source: UltimateNZSoccer
Legend: Blue = home team win; Yellow = draw; Red = away team win.

=== Championship scoring ===
==== Championship top scorers ====
Rank	Player	Club	Goals
1	(New Zealand) Joshua Clarkin	Cambridge	22
2	(New Zealand) Harley Hill	Hamilton Wanderers	17
2	(New Zealand) Aston Hurd	Northern Rovers	17
4	(New Zealand) William Litchfield	Ellerslie	11
5	(Somalia) Jama Boss	Melville United	9
5	(England) Daniel Bunch	Manukau United	9
7	(New Zealand) Luke Allport	Northern Rovers	7
7	(England) Jack Connor	Cambridge	7
7	(Argentina) Agustín Contratti	Manukau United	7
7	(Portugal) João Moreira	Takapuna	7

== Northern Conference ==
NRFL Northern Conference
- Season: 2025
- Dates: 29 March 2025 - 6 September 2025
- Champions: Northland
- Relegated: Franklin United

=== Northern Conference teams ===
Eight teams are competing in the league – five teams from the previous season, two teams relegated from the 2024 Championship, and one team promoted from the NRF League One. The relegated teams are Metro and Franklin United, while the promoted team is Central United. Beachlands Maraetai, Te Atatu and Oratia United were relegated.

Team	Location	Stadium	2024 season
Albany United	Albany, Auckland	Rosedale Park	4th
Beachlands Maraetai	Beachlands, Auckland	Te Puru Park	6th (Note: Beachlands Maraetai were relegated at the end of the 2024 season, however, Waiheke United withdrew in March 2025 and Beachlands were reprieved of relegation.)
Bucklands Beach	Bucklands Beach	Lloyd Elsmore Park	5th
Central United	Sandringham, Auckland	Kiwitea Street	1st in NRF League One (promoted)
Franklin United	Drury	Drury Sports Grounds	12th in Championship (relegated)
Metro	Mount Albert, Auckland	Phyllis Street	11th in Championship (relegated)
Northland	Morningside, Whangārei	Morningside Park	3rd
Waitemata	Te Atatū South, Auckland	McLeod Park	2nd

=== Northern Conference table ===
Pos	Team	Pld	W	D	L	GF	GA	GD	Pts	Qualification
1	Northland (C)	19	13	6	0	51	19	+32	45	Qualification for Conference play-offs
2	Central United	20	10	5	5	44	32	+12	35	
3	Bucklands Beach	21	11	2	8	39	33	+6	35	
4	Waitemata	21	8	6	7	39	30	+9	30	
5	Metro	20	9	3	8	43	37	+6	30	
6	Albany United	21	7	3	11	29	36	−7	24	
7	Beachlands Maraetai	21	4	6	11	26	42	−16	18	
8	Franklin United (R)	21	2	5	14	23	65	−42	11	Relegation to NRF League One

Source: Northern Region Football
Rules for classification: 1) Points; 2) Goal difference; 3) Goals scored; 4) Goals against; 5) Head to head; 6) Disciplinary record; 7) Coin toss
(C) Champions; (R) Relegated

=== Northern Conference results table ===
Home \ Away	ALB	BLM	BUC	CEN	FRA	MET	NOR	WTM	ALB	BLM	BUC	CEN	FRA	MET	NOR	WTM
Albany United	—	1–0	1–0	2–1	6–0	3–4	2–3	1–0	—	—	2–4	—	—	—	0–3	0–0
Beachlands Maraetai	0–2	—	0–2	0–3	0–2	3–2	1–2	3–1	0–2	—	—	—	3–0	—	1–1	—
Bucklands Beach	0–2	6–1	—	3–2	1–0	3–1	0–2	1–4	—	1–1	—	1–3	3–1	2–1	—	—
Central United	2–1	2–2	1–0	—	1–1	2–3	1–1	2–1	3–2	2–2	—	—	—	—	C (Note: Match between Central United and Northland was cancelled)	—
Franklin United	0–0	5–2	1–4	1–4	—	3–4	1–8	2–2	3–3	—	—	1–6	—	—	1–1	0–4
Metro	4–0	4–1	2–3	4–1	4–0	—	1–1	1–1	1–0	2–2	—	1–3	2–0	—	—	—
Northland	3–0	3–2	3–0	4–2	4–0	C (Note: Match between Northland and Metro was cancelled)	—	3–2	—	—	1–1	—	—	2–0	—	2–2
Waitemata	3–1	0–0	3–2	2–2	3–1	2–1	2–4	—	—	1–0	1–2	0–1	—	5–1	—	—

First match(es) will be played: 29 March 2025. Source: UltimateNZSoccer
Legend: Blue = home team win; Yellow = draw; Red = away team win.

==== Northern Conference scoring ====
As of 6 September 2025

===== Northern Conference top scorers =====
Rank	Player	Club	Goals
1	Sam Lloyd	Central United	14
1	Mohammed Haj	Metro	14
3	Sander Waterland	Bucklands Beach	13
4	Mitchell Hanmore	Northland	12
5	Shay Larkin	Northland	11
6	Matthew Hearn	Metro	10
6	Lukas Webster	Waitemata	10
8	Ashley Grover-Rudman	Franklin United	9
9	Caylem Nelson	Albany United	7
9	Aaron Parry	Beachlands Maraetai	7
9	Lyle Jones	Bucklands Beach	7
9	Phoenix Silver	Waitemata	7

== Southern Conference ==
NRFL Southern Conference
- Season: 2025
- Dates: 29 March 2025 - 30 August 2025
- Champions: Taupo
- Promoted: Taupo

=== Southern Conference teams ===
Eight teams are competing in the league – five teams from the previous season, and three teams from WaiBOP League One. Otorohanga won WaiBOP League One but declined promotion allowing Northern United and Matamata Swifts to be promoted. Waikato Unicol pulled out before the start of the season and were replaced by West Hamilton United. Cambridge won the league and play-off gaining promotion, while Te Awamutu were relegated.

Team	Location	Stadium	2024 season
Claudelands Rovers	Claudelands, Hamilton	Galloway Park	3rd
Matamata Swifts	Matamata	Matamata Domain	3rd in WaiBOP League One (promoted)
Ngongotahā Lakes (Note: Ngongotaha AFC signed a Memorandum of Understanding with Lakes FC at the end of the 2022 season to have a combined team for the 2023 season onwards.)	Ngongotahā, Rotorua	Tamarahi Reserve	7th
Northern United	Rototuna North, Hamilton	Korikori Park	2nd in WaiBOP League One (promoted)
Otumoetai	Matua, Tauranga	Fergusson Park	4th
Papamoa	Papamoa Beach, Papamoa	Gordon Spratt Reserve	6th
Taupo	Tauhara, Taupō	Crown Park	2nd
West Hamilton United	Melville, Hamilton	Mahoe Park	9th in WaiBOP League One (promoted) (Note: Waikato Unicol withdrew before the start of the 2025 season and were replaced by West Hamilton United.)

=== Southern Conference table ===
Pos	Team	Pld	W	D	L	GF	GA	GD	Pts	Qualification
1	Taupo (C, P)	21	17	0	4	91	30	+61	51	Qualification for Conference play-offs
2	Northern United	21	17	0	4	84	25	+59	51	
3	Otumoetai	21	15	0	6	68	37	+31	45	
4	Claudelands Rovers	21	11	0	10	62	50	+12	33	
5	Papamoa	21	9	1	11	46	43	+3	28	
6	Matamata Swifts	21	8	2	11	46	56	−10	26	
7	Ngongotahā Lakes	21	3	1	17	32	106	−74	10	
8	West Hamilton United	21	2	0	19	25	107	−82	6	

Source: Northern Region Football
Rules for classification: 1) Points; 2) Goal difference; 3) Goals scored; 4) Goals against; 5) Head to head; 6) Disciplinary record; 7) Coin toss
(C) Champions; (P) Promoted

=== Southern Conference results table ===
Home \ Away	CLR	MAT	NGO	NTU	OTU	PAP	TAU	WHU	CLR	MAT	NGO	NTU	OTU	PAP	TAU	WHU
Claudelands Rovers	—	2–0	6–2	0–3	1–3	1–2	1–2	5–0	—	3–4	—	0–4	—	7–1	1–12	—
Matamata Swifts	2–3	—	5–0	2–6	0–3	1–0	1–3	2–5	—	—	—	1–3	—	—	0–7	4–1
Ngongotahā Lakes	2–3	1–1	—	0–3	2–1	1–3	3–5	3–2	1–4	1–6	—	0–5	—	—	—	5–2
Northern United	2–3	1–3	12–0	—	3–4	2–1	4–1	8–1	—	—	—	—	—	3–0	2–0	5–1
Otumoetai	3–6	2–0	5–3	2–3	—	2–0	2–3	8–1	3–1	5–3	3–2	2–3	—	—	—	—
Papamoa	2–1	5–0	7–1	1–4	0–5	—	0–1	6–0	—	2–2	6–1	—	0–1	—	—	3–1
Taupo	2–1	3–4	12–1	3–1	2–3	3–0	—	6–2	—	—	11–0	—	2–1	5–1	—	—
West Hamilton United	0–9	0–5	4–3	0–7	2–4	1–6	1–4	—	0–4	—	—	—	0–6	—	1–4	—

First match(es) will be played: 29 March 2025. Source: UltimateNZSoccer
Legend: Blue = home team win; Yellow = draw; Red = away team win.

==== Southern Conference scoring ====
As of 13 September 2025

===== Southern Conference top scorers =====
Rank	Player	Club	Goals
1	Joe O'Donoghue	Taupo	33
2	Callum Smith	Otumoetai	17
3	Henry Stephen	Claudelands Rovers	16
4	Anton Ganas	Matamata Swifts	15
4	Liam Jessep	Northern United	15
6	Finlay Smith	Taupo	13
7	Dominick Edwards	Northern United	12
8	Harry Christensen-Rose	Claudelands Rovers	10
9	Jarrod Briggs	Northern United	8
9	Jack Boland	Otumoetai	8
9	Kierren Flower	Taupo	8

== Conference play-offs ==
The conference play-offs took place on 13 and 20 September 2025.

=== Overview ===
Team 1	Agg.	Team 2	1st leg	2nd leg
Northland (N)	0–2	Taupo (S)	0–1	0–1

=== Matches ===
13 September 2025
14:00 NZST

Northland	0–1	Taupo
	Report	Barbour 45+3'

Trigg Arena, Kensington
Referee: Yunjie Diao
20 September 2025
14:00 NZST

Taupo	1–0	Northland
Barbour 84'	Report

Crown Park, Tauhara
Referee: Riley Greenbury

Taupo won 2–0 on aggregate and was promoted to NRFL Championship.

== Women's Premiership ==
The NRFL Women's Premiership acts as a qualifier for the New Zealand Women's National League.

Eight teams are competing in the league – the top seven teams from the previous season and the promoted side from the 2024 NRFL Championship. The promoted team is FC Tauranga Moana as winners of the NRFL Championship. They replaced Hamilton Wanderers.

=== Women's Premiership table ===
Pos	Team	Pld	W	D	L	GF	GA	GD	Pts	Qualification
1	West Coast Rangers (C)	21	16	2	3	65	24	+41	50	Winner of NRFL Premiership and qualification to National League Championship
2	Auckland United	21	16	1	4	75	17	+58	49	Qualification to National League Championship
3	Eastern Suburbs	21	14	2	5	62	22	+40	44	Qualification to National League Championship
4	Western Springs	21	9	6	6	46	27	+19	33	Qualification to National League Championship
5	Fencibles United	21	7	6	8	32	38	−6	27	
6	Ellerslie	21	5	5	11	33	52	−19	20	
7	FC Tauranga Moana	21	3	1	17	22	99	−77	10	
8	Hibiscus Coast (R)	21	2	1	18	11	67	−56	7	Relegation to NRFL Women's Championship

Source: Northern Region Football
Rules for classification: 1) Points; 2) Goal difference; 3) Goals scored; 4) Goals against; 5) Head to head; 6) Disciplinary record; 7) Coin toss
(C) Champions; (R) Relegated

== Women's Championship ==
NRFL Women's Championship
- Season: 2025
- Dates: 30 March 2025 – 20 July 2025
- Champions: Melville United
- Promoted: Melville United
- Relegated: Central United

=== Women's Championship teams ===
Eight teams are competing in the league – six teams from the previous season, the one team relegated from the 2024 NRFL Premiership, Hamilton Wanderers, and one team promoted from the WaiBOP W-League as play-off winners. The promoted team is Cambridge. FC Tauranga Moana were promoted, while Manukau United were relegated. Hamilton Wanderers withdrew before the start of the season as they were unable to fulfil their league commitments. They were replaced by Onehunga-Mangere United, who originally lost the play-off to Cambridge.

Team	Location	Stadium	2024 season
Birkenhead United	Beach Haven, Auckland	Shepherds Park	5th
Cambridge	Cambridge	John Kerkhof Park	1st in WaiBOP W League (promoted via play-offs)
Central United	Sandringham	Kiwitea Street	7th
Franklin United	Drury	Drury Sports Grounds	2nd
Melville United	Melville, Hamilton	Gower Park	4th
Northern Rovers	Glenfield, Auckland	McFetridge Park	6th
Onehunga-Mangere United	Māngere Bridge, Auckland	Māngere Domain	1sth in NRF Conference (promoted) (Note: Hamilton Wanderers withdrew from the competition on 10 March 2025 after the fixtures had been released and were replaced by Onehunga-Mangere United.)
Onehunga Sports	Onehunga, Auckland	Waikaraka Park	3rd

=== Women's Championship table ===
Pos	Team	Pld	W	D	L	GF	GA	GD	Pts	Qualification
1	Melville United (C, P)	21	19	1	1	71	19	+52	58	Promotion to NRFL Women's Premiership
2	Franklin United	21	15	2	4	84	33	+51	47	
3	Onehunga Sports	21	13	2	6	49	27	+22	41	
4	Birkenhead United	21	12	3	6	45	29	+16	39	
5	Cambridge	21	8	1	12	30	47	−17	25	
6	Onehunga-Mangere United	21	4	1	16	22	64	−42	13	
7	Northern Rovers	21	3	3	15	34	67	−33	12	
8	Central United (R)	21	3	1	17	17	66	−49	10	Relegation to NRF Women's League One

Source: Northern Region Football
Rules for classification: 1) Points; 2) Goal difference; 3) Goals scored; 4) Goals against; 5) Head to head; 6) Disciplinary record; 7) Coin toss
(C) Champions; (P) Promoted; (R) Relegated

=== Women's Championship results table ===
Home \ Away	BIR	CAM	CEN	FRA	MEL	NTR	OHM	OHS	BIR	CAM	CEN	FRA	MEL	NTR	OHM	OHS
Birkenhead United	—								—							
Cambridge		—								—						
Central United			—								—					
Franklin United				—								—				
Melville United					—								—			
Northern Rovers						—								—		
Onehunga-Mangere United							—								—	
Onehunga Sports								—								—

First match(es) will be played: 30 March 2025. Source: Northern Region Football
Legend: Blue = home team win; Yellow = draw; Red = away team win.
