= 2016 Chatham Cup =

Tournament details
- Country: New Zealand
- Teams: 132

Final positions
- Champions: Birkenhead United
- Runners-up: Waitakere City

Awards
- Jack Batty Memorial Trophy: Tom Davis

The 2016 Chatham Cup was New Zealand's 89th annual knockout football competition.

The 2016 competition had a preliminary round, a qualification round, and four rounds proper before quarter-finals, semi-finals, and a final. The final, played on 11 September 2016, was won for the first time, by Auckland's Birkenhead United, who beat Waitakere City 3–2 in extra time. The Jack Batty Memorial Trophy for man of the final was won by Birkenheard's Tom Davis.

== Results ==
All results and dates are taken from the following sources: The Ultimate New Zealand Soccer Website, RSSSF and Soccerway.

=== Preliminary round ===
Northern Region

Bohemian Celtic	1–3	Warkworth	Colin Maiden Park, Auckland

Central Brown	4–2	Auckland Volcanoes	Blue Goose, Whangārei

Colo Boys	1–3	Cambridge FC	Greenhithe War Memorial Park, North Shore

Glen Eden Rangers	6–1	Drury United	Parrs Park, Auckland

Internationale	3–1	Tokoroa	Seddon Fields, Auckland

Kamo	5–1	Zamantix Rovers	Kamo Sports Park, Kamo

Lynn-Avon United	5–0	Kerikeri	Ken Maunder Park, Auckland

Matamata Swifts	1–2	Otumoetai	Matamata Domain, Matamata

Ngongotaha AFC	6–0	Old Blues	Tamarahi Reserve, Ngongotahā

Northern Wairoa	2–6	Auckland University	War Memorial Park, Wairoa

Norwest United	3–4	Bucklands Beach	Huapai Domain Ground, Auckland

Papatoetoe United	1–3	Ranui Swanson	Kolmar Sports Centre, Papatoetoe

Taupo AFC	4–0	Rotorua United	Crown Reserve, Taupō

Uni-Mount Bohemian Celtic	5–2	Northern United	Bill McKinlay Park, Auckland

Waiheke United	3–0	West Hamilton United	Onetangi Sports Park, Waiheke Island

Waikato Unicol	1–2	Auckland Wanderers	Jansen Park, Hamilton

Waitemata	3–0	South Auckland Rangers	McLeod Park, Te Atatū South

Southern Region

Melchester Rovers	2–3	Gore Wanderers AFC	Caledonian Ground, Dunedin

Timaru BHS	2–6	Timaru Thistle	Timaru Boys' High School, Timaru

West End United	1–3	Waihopai	West End Park, Timaru

All teams listed below received byes to the first round.

Northern Region: Albany United Football Club, Bay Olympic, Birkenhead United FC, Central United FC, Claudelands Rovers, East Coast Bays AFC, Eastern Suburbs AFC, Ellerslie AFC, Forrest Hill Milford AFC, Franklin United, Fencibles United AFC, Glenfield Rovers, Hamilton Wanderers FC, Hibiscus Coast AFC, Mangere United Soccer Club, Manukau City AFC, Manurewa AFC, Melville United AFC, Metro FC, Mt Albert Ponsonby, North Shore United AFC, Onehunga Mangere United, Ngaruawahia United AFC, Onehunga Sports, Oratia United, Papakura City FC, Papatoetoe AFC, Royal NZ Navy, Takapuna AFC, Tauranga City United FC, Te Atatu AFC, Three Kings United, Waitakere City AFC, Western Springs AFC
Central/Capital Region: Brooklyn Northern United, Eastbourne AFC, Island Bay United AFC, Lower Hutt City AFC, Kapiti Coast United, Marist AFC, Miramar Rangers AFC, North Wellington Association Football Club, Petone, Seatoun AFC, Stop Out Sports Club, Stokes Valley Football Club, Tawa AFC, Victoria University of Wellington, AFC Wairarapa United, Wainuiomata AFC, Wellington United, Wellington Olympic, Western Suburbs, Upper Hutt City, Devon Homes Wanganui Athletic, Gisborne Thistle, Havelock North Wanderers AFC, Massey University FC, Moturoa AFC, Napier City Rovers, New Plymouth Rangers AFC, Palmerston North Marist.
Mainland/Southern Region: Caversham AFC, Dunedin Technical AFC, Grant Braes, Green Island AFC, Queens Park AFC, Northern AFC, Northern Hearts AFC, Old Boys AFC, Otago University, Mornington AFC, Mosgiel AFC, Roslyn Wakari AFC, Queenstown Rovers, Burwood AFC, Cashmere Technical, Coastal Spirit FC, FC Nelson, FC Twenty 11, Ferrymead Bays, Halswell United AFC, Nomads United, Parklands United, Selwyn United FC, Richmond Athletic AFC, Wakefield FC, Western AFC, Waimak United FC, Universities.

=== Round 1 ===
Northern Region

Albany United	2–2 (a.e.t.) (1–3 p)	Te Atatu	Rosedale Park, Auckland

Auckland Wanderers	2–3	Papakura City

Cambridge	2–1	Auckland University	John Kerkhof Park, Cambridge

Ellerslie	2–1	Takapuna	Michaels Avenue Reserve, Ellerslie

Fencibles United	3–1	Claudelands Rovers	Riverhills Domain, Auckland

Glen Eden Rangers	1–2	Waiheke United	Parrs Park, Auckland

Hibiscus Coast	2–2 (a.e.t.) (4–2 p)	Papatoetoe	Stanmore Bay Park, Whangaparaoa

Internationale	3–3 (a.e.t.) (7–6 p)	Navy	Seddon Fields, Auckland

Kamo	0–2	Franklin United	Kamo Sports Park, Kamo

Metro	4–1	Ngongotaha	Phyllis Street Reserve, Auckland

Mt Albert Ponsonby	7–0	Warkworth	Anderson Park, Auckland

14 May 2016	Ngaruawahia United	3–0*	Mangere United	Centennial Park, Ngaruawahia

North Shore United	4–1	Manurewa	Allen Hill Stadium, North Shore

Onehunga-Mangere United	1–3	Bucklands Beach	Māngere Domain, Māngere

Oratia United	5–1	Lynn-Avon United	Parrs Park, West Auckland

Otumoetai	1–5	Waitakere City	Fergusson Park, Tauranga

Ranui Swanson	7–0	Central Brown	Starling Park, West Auckland

Taupo AFC	1–3	Manukau City	Crown Reserve, Taupō

Uni-Mount Bohemian Celtic	1–5	Waitemata	Bill McKinlay Park, Auckland

Central / Capital Region

Havelock North Wanderers	4–3	Gisborne Thistle	Guthrie Park, Havelock North

Island Bay United	2–1	Stop Out	Wakefield Park, Wellington

Lower Hutt City	3–1	Victoria University	Fraser Park, Lower Hutt

New Plymouth Rangers	2–0	Moturoa	Merrilands Domain, New Plymouth

North Wellington	7–0	Seatoun	Alex Moore Park, Wellington

Stokes Valley	2–4	Wellington Marist	Delaney Park, Lower Hutt

Tawa	1–0	Petone	Redwood Park, Wellington

Upper Hutt City	2–1	Brooklyn Northern United	Maidstone Park, Upper Hutt

Wainuiomata	1–3	Kapiti Coast United	Richard Prouse Park, Lower Hutt

Wairarapa United	5–4	Waterside Karori	Memorial Park, Masterton

Wanganui Athletic	1–5	Massey University	Wembley Park, Wanganui

Wellington Olympic	0–1	Miramar Rangers	Wakefield Park, Wellington

Wellington United	7–0	Naenae	Newtown Park, Wellington

Western Suburbs	14–1	Eastbourne	Endeavour Park, Porirua

Mainland Region

Burwood	0–17	Cashmere Technical	Clare Park, Christchurch

Coastal Spirit	5–1	Parklands United	Cuthberts Green, Christchurch

Ferrymead Bays	0–1	Halswell United	Ferrymead Park, Christchurch

Nomads United	2–3	Canterbury University	Tulett Park, Christchurch

Selwyn United	3–0	Waimakariri United	Foster Park, Christchurch

Wakefield	1–5	Richmond Athletic	Wakefield Recreation Reserve, Wakefield

West End	1–2	Timaru Thistle	West End Park, Timaru

Western	0–1	FC Twenty 11	Westminster Park, Christchurch

Southern Region

Caversham	5–0	Northern	Tonga Park, Dunedin

Dunedin Technical	3–1	Northern Hearts	Culling Park, Dunedin

Gore Wanderers	1–0	Queens Park	Hyde Park, Gore

Grants Braes	3–1	Invercargill Old Boys	Ocean Grove Sports Ground, Dunedin

Otago University	3–1	Mornington	Caledonian Ground, Dunedin

Queenstown Rovers	4–2	Green Island	Queenstown Events Centre, Queenstown

Roslyn-Wakari	3–3 (a.e.t.) (5–4 p)	Mosgiel	Ellis Park, Dunedin

*The match between Ngaruawahia and Mangere was originally an on-field 3–0 win for Mangere but they were deemed to have fielded an ineligible player and the result was overturn to a 3–0 loss instead. Ngaruawahia progressed to round two.

All teams listed below received byes to the second round.

Northern Region: Bay Olympic, Birkenhead United, Central United, East Coast Bays, Eastern Suburbs, Forrest Hill-Milford United, Glenfield Rovers, Hamilton Wanderers, Melville United, Onehunga Sports, Tauranga City United, Three Kings United, Western Springs
Capital Region: Marist Palmerston North, Napier City Rovers

=== Round 2 ===
Northern Region

6 June 2016	Bucklands Beach	1–5	Hibiscus Coast	Rogers Park, Bucklands Beach
12:00		Report

6 June 2016	Central United	4–2	Cambridge	Kiwitea Street, Auckland
12:00		Report

6 June 2016	Eastern Suburbs	4–2	Hamilton Wanderers	Bill McKinlay Park, Auckland
12:00		Report

6 June 2016	Fencibles United	2–7	Birkenhead United	Riverhills Domain, Auckland
12:00		Report

6 June 2016	Franklin United	3–7	Forrest Hill Milford United	Bledisloe Park, Pukekohe
12:00		Report

6 June 2016	Glenfield Rovers	0–1	Waitakere City	McFetridge Park, North Shore
12:00		Report

6 June 2016	Internationale	1–8	Waitemata	Seddon Fields, Auckland
12:00		Report

6 June 2016	Manukau City	1–1 (2–1 p)	North Shore United	Walter Massey Park, Māngere
12:00		Report

6 June 2016	Melville United	2–3	Mt Albert Ponsonby	Gower Park, Hamilton
12:00		Report

2 July 2016	Ngaruawahia United	0–5	Western Springs	Centennial Park, Ngaruawahia
		Report

6 June 2016	Papakura City	2–5	East Coast Bays	McLennan Park, Auckland
12:00		Report

6 June 2016	Ranui Swanson	2–4	Waiheke United	Starling Park, West Auckland
12:00		Report

6 June 2016	Tauranga City	0–1	Bay Olympic	Links Avenue, Mount Maunganui
12:00		Report

6 June 2016	Te Atatu	4–3	Oratia United	Te Atatū Peninsula Park, Auckland
12:00		Report

6 June 2016	Three Kings United	1–0	Onehunga Sports	Keith Hay Park, Auckland
12:00		Report

6 June 2016	Ellerslie	1–2	Metro	Michaels Avenue Reserve, Ellerslie
13:00		Report

Central / Capital Region

6 June 2016	Upper Hutt City	5–0	Havelock North Wanderers	Maidstone Park, Upper Hutt
11:00		Report

6 June 2016	Kapiti Coast United	0–1	North Wellington	Weka Park, Kāpiti
12:00		Report

6 June 2016	Napier City Rovers	11–0	Massey University	Bluewater Stadium, Napier
12:00		Report

6 June 2016	New Plymouth Rangers	0–3	Palmerston North Marist	Merrilands Domain, New Plymouth
12:00		Report

6 June 2016	Tawa	1–0	Wellington Marist	Redwood Park, Wellington
12:00		Report

6 June 2016	Western Suburbs	1–2	Wairarapa United	Endeavour Park, Porirua
12:00		Report

6 June 2016	Lower Hutt City	0–2	Miramar Rangers	Bell Park, Lower Hutt
13:00		Report

6 June 2016	Island Bay United	v	Wellington United	Wakefield Park, Wellington
16:30		Report

Mainland

6 June 2016	FC Nelson	0–4	Richmond Athletic	Victory Square Field, Nelson
11:30		Report

6 June 2016	Cashmere Technical	3–0	Selwyn United	Garrick Memorial Park, Christchurch
12:00		Report

6 June 2016	Halswell United	0–1	Canterbury University	Halswell Domain, Christchurch
12:00		Report

6 June 2016	FC Twenty 11	1–2	Coastal Spirit	Avonhead Park, Christchurch
13:00		Report

Southern

5 June 2016	Gore Wanderers	2–1	Grants Braes	Hyde Park, Gore
12:00		Report

6 June 2016	Dunedin Technical	6–0	Timaru Thistle	Tahuna Park, Dunedin
12:00		Report

6 June 2016	Otago University	0–4	Caversham	Caledonian Ground, Dunedin
12:00		Report

6 June 2016	Roslyn-Wakari	0–3	Queenstown Rovers	Ellis Park, Dunedin
12:00		Report

=== Round 3 ===
Northern Region

25 June 2016	East Coast Bays	4–2	Eastern Suburbs	Bay City Park, North Shore
14:00		Report

25 June 2016	Forrest Hill Milford United	5–2	Mt Albert Ponsonby	Becroft Park, North Shore
14:00		Report

25 June 2016	Central United	1–2	Waitemata	Kiwitea Street, Auckland
14:00		Report

25 June 2016	Hibiscus Coast	0–1	Waitakere City	Stanmore Bay Park, Whangaparaoa
14:00		Report

25 June 2016	Te Atatu	5–3 (a.e.t.)	Waiheke United	Te Atatū Peninsula Park, Auckland
14:00		Report

25 June 2016	Manukau City	0–2	Bay Olympic	Walter Massey Park, Māngere
14:30		Report

25 June 2016	Metro	1–3	Three Kings United	Phyllis Street Reserve, Auckland
17:00		Report

10 July 2016	Western Springs	0–2	Birkenhead United	Seddon Fields, Auckland
15:00		Report

Central / Capital

25 June 2016	Palmerston North Marist	4–2	Island Bay United	Memorial Park, Palmerston North
14:30		Report

25 June 2016	North Wellington	5–1	Upper Hutt City	Alex Moore Park, Wellington
15:00		Report

26 June 2016	Napier City Rovers	3–4	Miramar Rangers	Bluewater Stadium, Napier
14:00		Report

26 June 2016	Tawa	0–2	Wairarapa United	Redwood Park, Wellington
14:00		Report

Mainland / Southern

25 June 2016	Canterbury University	3–0	Richmond Athletic	Ilam Field, Christchurch
13:00		Report

25 June 2016	Cashmere Technical	2–0	Coastal Spirit	Garrick Memorial Park, Christchurch
14:00		Report

25 June 2016	Queenstown Rovers	3–1	Gore Wanderers	Queenstown Events Centre, Queenstown
14:00		Report

25 June 2016	Caversham	2–1	Dunedin Technical	Tonga Park, Dunedin
14:00		Report

=== Round 4 ===
Northern Region

16 July 2016	Waitakere City	3–1	Waitemata	Fred Taylor Park, West Auckland
14:00		Report

16 July 2016	Te Atatu	1–2	Three Kings United	Te Atatū Peninsula Park, West Auckland
14:00		Report

16 July 2016	Forrest Hill Milford United	3–0	Bay Olympic	Becroft Park, North Shore
14:00		Report

16 July 2016	East Coast Bays	3–5 (a.e.t.)	Birkenhead United	Bay City Park, North Shore
14:00		Report

Central / Capital

16 July 2016	Wairarapa United	2–4	Miramar Rangers	Memorial Park, Masterton
17:30		Report

17 July 2016	Palmerston North Marist	2–3	North Wellington	Memorial Park, Palmerston North
14:00		Report

Mainland / Southern

16 July 2016	Queenstown Rovers	0–1 (a.e.t.)	Caversham	Queenstown Events Centre, Queenstown
14:00		Report

16 July 2016	Canterbury University	0–3	Cashmere Technical	Ilam Field, Christchurch
14:00		Report

=== Quarter-finals ===
6 August 2016	Three Kings United	6–1	North Wellington	Keith Hay Park, Auckland
13:00		Report

6 August 2016	Cashmere Technical	2–4	Miramar Rangers	Garrick Memorial Park, Christchurch
14:00		Report

6 August 2016	Waitakere City	3–1	Caversham	Fred Taylor Park, West Auckland
14:00		Report

7 August 2016	Forrest Hill Milford United	0–3	Birkenhead United	Becroft Park, North Shore
14:30		Report

=== Semi-finals ===
28 August 2016	Birkenhead United	3–1	Miramar Rangers	Shepherds Park, North Shore
14:00		Report

28 August 2016	Waitakere City	6–1	Three Kings United	Fred Taylor Park, West Auckland
14:00		Report

=== Final ===
11 September 2016
15:30

Birkenhead United	3–2 (a.e.t.)	Waitakere City
Smith 23', 38'; Galbraith 111'	Report	Manickum 86'; Linderboom 89' (pen.)

QBE Stadium, North Shore
Attendance: 4,200+
Referee: John Rowbury
