= 2022 Kate Sheppard Cup =

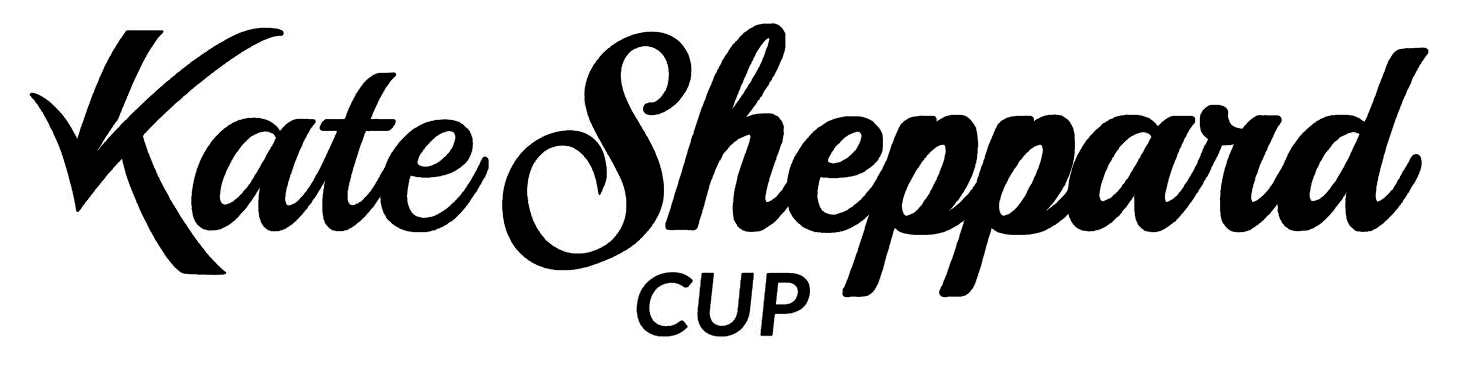

Tournament details
- Country: New Zealand
- Dates: 22 April 2022 – 11 September 2022
- Teams: 56

Final positions
- Champions: Auckland United
- Runners-up: Northern Rovers

Tournament statistics
- Matches played: 55
- Goals scored: 280 (5.09 per match)

The 2022 Kate Sheppard Cup was New Zealand's women's 28th annual knockout football competition. This was the fifth year that the competition is known by the Kate Sheppard Cup, or New Zealand Football Foundation Kate Sheppard Cup for sponsorship purposes, after previously been known as the Women's Knockout Cup since its establishment. The cup has had thirteen different winners lift the trophy over its 28-year history with Lynn-Avon United from Auckland being the most successful and Wellington United being the current holders from the 2021 season.

The 2022 competition had four rounds before quarter-finals, semi-finals, and a final. Competition ran in three regions (northern, central/capital, southern) until the quarter-finals, from which stage the draw will be open. In all, 56 teams entered the competition this year which means the cup had a preliminary round added for the Mainland region.

== Results ==
=== Preliminary round ===
All matches were played over the Anzac weekend of 22–25 April 2022. All 6 teams in this round compete in level 3 of the Mainland Region.

Mainland Region

24 April 2022	Golden Bay AFC (3)	0–18	Richmond Athletic (3)	Tākaka
13:00		Report		Stadium: Takaka Rec Ground

25 April 2022	FC Nelson (3)	0–4	Nelson Suburbs (3)	Nelson
13:00		Report		Stadium: Guppy Park; Referee: Allen Ohlson

25 April 2022	Christchurch United (3)	5–0	Halswell United (3)	Christchurch
14:00		Report		Stadium: Christchurch Football Centre

All teams listed below received byes to the first round.
Northern Region: Auckland United, Beachlands Maretai AFC, Birkenhead United, Eastern Suburbs, Ellerslie AFC, Fencilbles United, Franklin United, Greenhithe FC, Hisbiscus Coast, Manukau United, Manurewa AFC, North Shore United, Northern Rovers, Onehunga Sports FC, Onerahi, Takapuna AFC, Waiuku AFC, West Coast Rangers, Western Springs, Cambridge FC, Claudelands Rovers, Hamilton Wanderers, Lakes Football Club, Melville United, Otumoetai FC, Papamoa FC, Tauranga City, Waikato Unicol AFC
Central/Capital Region: Brooklyn Northern United, Waterside Karori, Kapiti Coast United, Miramar Rangers, Petone FC, Seatoun AFC, Victoria University, Wellington United, PN Marist FC, New Plymouth Rangers
Mainland Region: FC Twenty 11, Cashmere Technical, Coastal Spirit, Nomads United, Universities of Canterbury AFC
Southern Region: Dunedin City Royals, Green Island, Mosgiel AFC, Northern AFC, Otago University AFC, Queenstown AFC, Roslyn Wakari

=== Round 1 ===
All matches will be played over the weekend of 14–15 May 2022. This round contained one team from level 6, Waiuku, the lowest ranked team left in the competition.

Northern Region

14 May 2022	Melville United (3)	1–2	Onehunga Sports (3)	Hamilton
11:00		Report		Stadium: Gower Park

14 May 2022	Tauranga City (2)	8–0	Claudelands Rovers (3)	Mount Maunganui
14:30		Report		Stadium: Links Avenue

14 May 2022	Fencibles United (3)	0–6	Northern Rovers (1)	Auckland
19:30		Report		Stadium: William Green Domain

15 May 2022	Beachlands Maraetai (3)	2–0	Cambridge FC (4)	Beachlands
12:30		Report		Stadium: Te Puru Park

15 May 2022	Lakes Football Club (3)	0–2	Otumoetai FC (3)	Rotorua
13:00		Report		Stadium: Rotorua International Stadium

15 May 2022	Takapuna (5)	0–4	Manukau United (3)	Takapuna
13:00		Report		Stadium: Taharoto Park

15 May 2022	Greenhithe FC (4)	1–3	Franklin United (3)	North Shore
13:00		Report		Stadium: Rosedale Park

15 May 2022	North Shore United (5)	0–2	Birkenhead United (3)	North Shore
13:00		Report		Stadium: Allen Hill Stadium

15 May 2022	Ellerslie (2)	13–0	Papamoa FC (4)	Ellerslie
14:00		Report		Stadium: Michaels Avenue Reserve

15 May 2022	Waikato Unicol (3)	6–0	Manurewa (5)	Hamilton
14:00		Report		Stadium: Jansen Park

15 May 2022	Waiuku (6)	0–16	Hibiscus Coast (3)	Waiuku
14:00		Report		Stadium: Massey Park

15 May 2022	West Coast Rangers (2)	10–0	Onerahi FC (4)	Kumeū
14:00		Report		Stadium: Huapai Reserve

Central/Capital Region

14 May 2022	Petone (2)	14–0	Miramar Rangers (5)	Lower Hutt
10:45		Report		Stadium: Memorial Park

15 May 2022	Kapiti Coast United (3)	1–0	Brooklyn Northern United (3)	Kāpiti
13:00		Report		Stadium: Weka Park

Mainland Region

14 May 2022	Universities (2)	0–6	Coastal Spirit (2)	Christchurch
11:00		Report		Stadium: Ilam Fields

14 May 2022	Christchurch United (3)	4–7 (a.e.t.)	Cashmere Technical (2)	Christchurch
14:00		Report		Stadium: Christchurch Football Centre

14 May 2022	Nomads United (2)	8–0	FC Twenty 11 (3)	Christchurch
14:30		Report		Stadium: Tulett Park

15 May 2022	Nelson Suburbs (3)	4–0	Richmond Athletic (3)	Nelson
14:00		Report		Stadium: Saxton Field

Southern Region

14 May 2022	Otago University (2)	2–0 (a.e.t.)	Queenstown (2)	Dunedin
12:00		Report		Stadium: Dunedin Artificial Turf

15 May 2022	Dunedin City Royals (2)	7–0	Green Island (2)	Dunedin
12:30		Report		Stadium: Dunedin Artificial Turf

15 May 2022	Northern (2)	5–0	Roslyn-Wakari (2)	Dunedin
12:30		Report		Stadium: Forrester Park

All teams listed below received byes to the second round.
Northern Region: Auckland United, Eastern Suburbs, Hamilton Wanderers, Western Springs.
Central/Capital Region: New Plymouth Rangers, Palmerston North Marist, Seatoun, Victoria University of Wellington, Waterside Karori, Wellington United.
Southern Region: Mosgiel.

=== Round 2 ===
All matches were played on Queen's Birthday weekend 3-6 June 2022. This round contained 11 teams from level 3, the lowest ranked teams left in the competition.

Northern Region

3 June 2022	Western Springs (1)	1–2 (a.e.t.)	Northern Rovers (1)	Auckland
18:45	Dyer 38'	Report	Canham 11'; Foster 105' (pen.)	Stadium: Ngahue Reserve; Referee: Reza Al Rabea

4 June 2022	Tauranga City (2)	4–1	Onehunga Sports (3)	Mount Maunganui
14:30	Cawte 29' (pen.); Entwisle 30'; Windsor 45+3'; Collins 85'	Report	Gallagher 48'	Stadium: Links Avenue; Referee: Paul Shakes

5 June 2022	Manukau United (3)	0–3	Birkenhead United (3)	Auckland
13:00		Report	Leat 18'; Erasmus 79'; Coop 82' (o.g.)	Stadium: Walter Massey Park; Referee: Malcolm Hansen

5 June 2022	Otumoetai FC (3)	1–6	Eastern Suburbs (1)	Tauranga
14:00	Metzger 5'	Report	Lucas 2', 60'; Jackson 12', 42'; Atkins 36'; Byrne 90+1'	Stadium: Fergusson Park; Referee: Nadia Browning

6 June 2022	West Coast Rangers (2)	3–2	Franklin United (3)	Whenuapai
11:00	Wright 18', 25'; Smith 56'	Report	Marthe 50'; Irvine 67'	Stadium: Fred Taylor Park; Referee: Deborah Stevens

6 June 2022	Ellerslie (2)	3–0	Hamilton Wanderers (2)	Ellerslie
14:00	Pretty 7'; Green 34'; James 72'	Report		Stadium: Michaels Avenue Reserve; Referee: Tony Westmoreland

6 June 2022	Beachlands Maraetai (3)	1–4	Waikato Unicol (3)	Beachlands
14:00	Grimmer 32'	Report	Stokes 22'; Leaver 39', 90'; Williams 62'	Stadium: Te Puru Park; Referee: Kirk Davis

6 June 2022	Hibiscus Coast (3)	0–3	Auckland United (1)	Whangaparaoa
14:00		Report	Nathan 18'; Bloomfield 35' (pen.); Catton 85'	Stadium: Stanmore Bay Park; Referee: Roberto Ferri

Central/Capital Region

4 June 2022	Petone (2)	3–1	Seatoun (2)	Lower Hutt
11:00	Otte 19'; McKenzie 63'; McIntosh 90'	Report	Kilkenny-Brown 33'	Stadium: Memorial Park; Referee: Conor Healy

4 June 2022	Victoria University (2)	0–6	Palmerston North Marist (2)	Wellington
13:00		Report	Kleinsman 13', 50'; Sanson 16', 53'; McKenna 23', 62'	Stadium: Boyd Wilson Turf; Referee: Selwyn Bates

5 June 2022	New Plymouth Rangers (3)	0–3	Waterside Karori (2)	New Plymouth
14:00		Report	Ward 8', 26'; Barry 66'	Stadium: Merrilands Domain; Referee: Matthew Hastings

6 June 2022	Kapiti Coast United (3)	0–5	Wellington United (2)	Kāpiti
14:00		Report	Robertson 5', 62'; Olliver-Bell 31'; Barrott 69'; Yamoah 79'	Stadium: Weka Park; Referee: Graham Strang

Mainland Region

4 June 2022	Cashmere Technical (2)	5–0	Nomads United (2)	Christchurch
13:00	Dyer 9'; Alexander 30'; Dominikovich 45'; Wall 77'; Arthur 89'	Report		Stadium: English Park; Referee: Courteney Bremner

6 June 2022	Nelson Suburbs (3)	0–2	Coastal Spirit (2)	Nelson
12:00		Report	Cameron 52'; Hepburn 80'	Stadium: Saxton Field; Referee: Richard Malcolm

Southern Region

6 June 2022	Mosgiel (2)	1–3 (a.e.t.)	Otago University (2)	Mosgiel
12:30		Report		Stadium: Memorial Park; Referee: Bruce James

6 June 2022	Dunedin City Royals (2)	2–0	Roslyn-Wakari (2)	Dunedin
14:30	Smith 61'; Dias 86'	Report		Stadium: Tahuna Park; Referee: Samuel Dannenberg

=== Round 3 ===
All matches were played on the weekend of 18–19 June 2022. This round contained two teams from level 3, Birkenhead United and Waikato Unicol, the lowest ranked teams left in the competition.

Northern Region

19 June 2022	Birkenhead United (3)	0–5	Tauranga City (2)	North Shore
12:00		Report	Entwisle 14', 80'; Windsor 37'; Collins 67', 83'	Stadium: Shepherds Park; Referee: Aaron Day

19 June 2022	Ellerslie (2)	1–3	Northern Rovers (1)	Ellerslie
14:00	Oosterbeek 53'	Report	Cook 45+1'; Harrison 78'; Noble 80'	Stadium: Michaels Avenue Reserve; Referee: Yunjie Diao

19 June 2022	West Coast Rangers (2)	0–3	Auckland United (1)	Whenuapai
14:00		Report	Puketapu 55', 71'; Johnson 84'	Stadium: Fred Taylor Park; Referee: Lee Juno

19 June 2022	Waikato Unicol (3)	0–5	Eastern Suburbs (1)	Hamilton
14:00		Report	Lucas 3'; Page 9'; Jackson 42'; Carlton 74'; van Dort 88'	Stadium: Jansen Park; Referee: Seamus Casey

Central/Capital Region

18 June 2022	Waterside Karori (2)	3–0	Petone (2)	Wellington
12:00	Burden 32'; Barry 74'; Kruszona 82'	Report		Stadium: Karori Park; Referee: Carl Tinsley

18 June 2022	Palmerston North Marist (2)	2–2 (a.e.t.) (6–5 p)	Wellington United (2)	Palmerston North
15:00	Trewhitt 13'; Lyne-lewis 70'	Report	Crowe 60'; Lynch-Gerrard 71'	Stadium: Arena Turf; Referee: Simon Roebuck
	Penalties
	Boxall (penalty scored); Lyne-lewis (penalty missed); McKenna (penalty scored); Trewhitt (penalty scored); Bennett (penalty scored); Falloon (penalty scored); Carpenter (penalty scored)		(penalty scored) Ohlsson; (penalty scored) Olliver-Bell; (penalty scored) Catherwood; (penalty scored) Strom; (penalty missed) Barrott; (penalty scored) de Ronde; (penalty missed) Smith

Mainland

18 June 2022	Coastal Spirit (2)	0–1	Cashmere Technical (2)	Christchurch
11:00		Report	Loye 87' (pen.)	Stadium: St Albans Park; Referee: Courteney Bremner

Southern Region

18 June 2022	Dunedin City Royals (2)	4–0	Otago University (2)	Dunedin
12:30	Whittaker 3'; Dias 14'; Mackay-Wright 57'; Morison 73'	Report		Stadium: Logan Park; Referee: Donna Agnew

=== Quarter-finals ===
All of the matches will be played on the weekend 9–10 July 2022. This round contained eight teams from level 2.

Northern Region

9 July 2022	Eastern Suburbs (1)	1–3	Northern Rovers (1)	Auckland
14:00	van Dort 38' (pen.)	Report	Harrison 32'; Canham 55'; Foster 57'	Stadium: Madills Farm; Referee: Kirsty Whiting

9 July 2022	Tauranga City (2)	0–4	Auckland United (1)	Mount Maunganui
14:30		Report		Stadium: Links Avenue; Referee: Sarah Elyse Joens

Central/Capital Region

9 July 2022	Palmerston North Marist (2)	1–0	Waterside Karori (2)	Palmerston North
12:30	Coakley 34'	Report		Stadium: Arena Turf; Referee: O-zaing Ye Nat

Mainland/Southern Region

10 July 2022	Cashmere Technical (2)	1–3 (a.e.t.)	Dunedin City Royals (2)	Christchurch
13:00		Report		Stadium: English Park; Referee: Alessandro Cvasniuc

=== Semi-finals ===
Matches were played on the weekend of the 20 August 2022.

20 August 2022	Auckland United (1)	5–2	Palmerston North Marist (2)	Auckland
13:45	Puketapu 31', 56', 66', 79'; Johnson 39'	Report	Kleinsman 55', 83'	Stadium: Keith Hay Park; Referee: Beth Rattray

20 August 2022	Northern Rovers (1)	2–2 (a.e.t.) (5–3 p)	Dunedin City Royals (2)	Auckland
14:00	Ryan 12'; McConnell 99'	Report	Smith 55'; Mackay-Wright 105+1'	Stadium: McFetridge Park; Referee: Chris Trent
	Penalties
	Green (penalty scored); Haering (penalty scored); Foster (penalty scored); Cook (penalty scored); Elliott (penalty scored)		(penalty scored) Mackay-Wright; (penalty scored) Smith; (penalty missed) Collin; (penalty scored) Dias

=== Final ===
The final was played on the 11 September 2022.

11 September 2022
13:00

Northern Rovers (1)	0–1	Auckland United (1)
	Report	Puketapu 56'

North Harbour Stadium, Auckland

== Notes ==
The tier that teams are in (as indicated in brackets next to their name) are based on the New Zealand football league system for the 2022 season. As some teams can qualify and play in more than one league (and tier) per season, the highest tier that they take part in is the one noted next to their name.
