= Northern Region Football =

Football organisation in New Zealand

- Founded: 2020
- Headquarters: Football House, North Harbour Stadium, Stadium Drive, Albany
- FIFA affiliation: New Zealand Football
- Chief Executive: Laura Menzies
- Website: official website

The Northern Region Football (NRF) is an association football organisation, responsible for local growth and development of the game from Northland to South Auckland, New Zealand.

Previously the Northern Football Federation ran football from Northland down to the North Shore and West Auckland, while the Auckland Football Federation covered the rest of the Auckland region.

In 2019, a joint meeting was held to consider a joint operating model in 2020. Northern Region Football was formed in 2020 and Laura Menzies was appointed as the new organisation's first Chief Executive Officer.

== Member clubs ==
Club directory:

Far North	Whangarei	Upper Harbour	Waitakere	Central West	Central East	South Auckland
Bay Cosmos	Bream Bay United	Air Force	Glen Eden United	Auckland City	Beachlands Maraetai	Clendon United
Kaeo-Inter	Central Brown	Albany United	Oratia United	Auckland United	Bucklands Beach	Clevedon FC
Kaikohe AFC	FC Whangarei	Birkenhead United	Ranui Swanson	Bay Olympic	East City Futsal	Drury United
Kaitaia United	Hora Hora	East Coast Bays	Te Atatu	Central United	Eastern Suburbs	Franklin United
Kerikeri FC	Kamo	Greenhithe FC	Waitemata	Lynn-Avon United	Ellerslie AFC	High School Old Boys
Ohaeawai School	Madhatters	Hibiscus Coast	West Auckland	Metro FC	Fencibles United	Mangere United
Okaihau Primary School	Mangakahia	Navy	potans fc	Mount Albert-Ponsonby	Western Springs	Manukau City
Paihia FC	Mangawhai	North Shore United		Onehunga Sports	Uni-Mount Bohemian AFC	Manukau United
Russell FC	Manaia Tigers	Northern Rovers		Waiheke United		Manurewa AFC
	Marist Whangarei	Puhoi SC				Onehunga-Mangere United
	Ngunguru FC	Takapuna				Otahuhu United
	Northland FC	Warkworth				Papakura City
	Northern Wairoa					Papatoetoe
	Onerahi FC					Papatoetoe United
	Tikipunga FC					Pukekohe
						South Auckland Rangers
						Tuakau SC
						Waiuku
