= Cole Tinkler =

New Zealand footballer (born 1986)

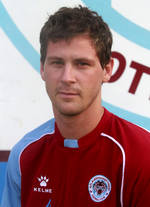

Personal information
- Full name: Cole Allen Wilson Tinkler
- Date of birth: 5 May 1986 (age 40)
- Place of birth: Hamilton, New Zealand
- Height: 1.85 m (6 ft 1 in)
- Position: Defender

Team information
- Current team: Kiwi fc/All Rights
- Number: 17

Senior career*
Years	Team	Apps	(Gls)
2004–2005	New Zealand Knights	37	(11)
2005	Melville United	22	(8)
2005–2006	Waitakere United	24	(6)
2007	Team Wellington	24	(9)
2007–2010	Sengkang-Punggol	74	(20)
2011–	APIA Leichhardt Tigers	13	(0)

International career^{‡}
2001–2003	New Zealand U-17	10	(3)
2004–2006	New Zealand U-20	7	(4)
2007–2008	New Zealand U-23	15	(6)
- * Club domestic league appearances and goals as of 11 March 2011 ‡ National team caps and goals as of 30 November 2010

Cole Allen Wilson Tinkler (born 5 May 1986) is a New Zealand footballer who plays for APIA Leichhardt Tigers in the New South Wales Premier League.

== Career ==
Tinkler played as a right full back for the New Zealand Knights in the Hyundai A-League, and more recently at Waitakere United and Team Wellington in the ASB Premiership.

In 2005 after the demise of the New Zealand Knights Tinkler played for Melville United in the Lotto Sport Italia NRFL Premier, then from 2005 to 2006 he had played for Waitakere United before going to sign for Team Wellington where he played from 2007 to 2008 then Tinkler decided it was time for him to travel overseas to find professional football club he moved to Asia in 2008. Cole most recently played for Sengkang-Punggol Football Club, in the S-League in Singapore where he has been plying his trade since 2008. He made his debut against Gombak United Football Club and helped the club reach its first ever finals, the Singapore League Cup Final. However, they were to lose 4–0.

== International career ==
In January 2006, he received his first call-up for the All Whites, the New Zealand national team, for the series against Malaysia, in February 2006. However, he didn't play in any of the matches. He was included in the New Zealand squad for the football tournament at the Summer Olympics in Beijing where he played in two group matches; the 1–1 draw with China, and 0–1 loss to Belgium.
