= Jama Boss =

Somali footballer (born 1994)

Personal information
- Date of birth: 5 March 1994 (age 32)
- Place of birth: Somalia
- Position: Forward

Team information
- Current team: Hamilton Wanderers

Youth career
- 2013–2015: Waikato

Senior career*
| Years | Team | Apps | (Gls) |
| 2015–2017 | Hamilton Wanderers | 50 | (25) |
| 2017–2019 | Melville United | 60 | (35) |
| 2019–2020 | Tasman United | 8 | (1) |
| 2020 | Hamilton Wanderers | 9 | (6) |
| 2020 | Manukau United | 20 | (16) |
| 2021 | Melville United | 8 | (5) |
| 2021–2023 | St Albans Saints | 6 | (0) |
| 2024– | Hamilton Wanderers | 0 | (0) |

International career^{‡}
| 2022– | Somalia | 1 | (0) |
- * Club domestic league appearances and goals as of 16:45, 3 April 2022 (UTC) ‡ National team caps and goals as of 16:45, 3 April 2022 (UTC)

Jama Boss (born 5 March 1994) is a Somali footballer who plays as a forward for New Zealand NRFL Championship club Hamilton Wanderers and the Somalia national team. He has played in Australia and New Zealand.

== Club career ==
Born in Somalia, Boss moved to Yemen with his family when he was three-months-old. At the age of 12, following the death of his father, Boss moved to Hamilton, New Zealand in order to be closer to his relatives.

In December 2013, Boss joined Waikato, signing for Hamilton Wanderers in 2015. In 2017, Boss signed for Melville United. After three seasons with Melville, Boss joined Tasman United. At Tasman, Boss scored one league goal in eight appearances, rejoining Hamilton Wanderers in 2020. After a short five game stint with Hamilton, Boss signed for Manukau United later that year. In 2021, Melville re-signed Boss. During the 2021 New Zealand National League season, Boss scored five goals in eight games for Melville. In 2021, Boss moved to Australia, signing for St Albans Saints.

On 25 January 2024, Boss signed for Hamilton Wanderers for the 2024 New Zealand National League.

== International career ==
On 27 March 2022, Boss made his debut for Somalia in a 2–1 loss against Eswatini in the qualification for the 2023 Africa Cup of Nations.
