= Maria Anderton =

Kiwi association footballer

Personal information
- Full name: Maria Anderton
- Date of birth: 14 January 1969 (age 57)
- Place of birth: Waikato, New Zealand
- Position: Midfielder

Team information
- Current team: Cambridge FC
- Number: 10

International career
Years	Team	Apps	(Gls)
1993–1994	New Zealand	4	(1)

Maria Anderton (born 14 January 1969) is a former association football player who represented New Zealand at international level.

Anderton scored on her Football Ferns début after coming on as a substitute in a 7–0 win over Trinidad & Tobago on 8 August 1993, and finished her international career with four caps and one goal to her credit. Her other international appearances were against Brazil, the USSR and Ghana.

She began playing football as a 10-year-old primary school student in Gordonton, Waikato District, and then at Fairfield College, Hamilton, New Zealand. She represented Waikato at U13, U14, U17 and U19 level and played club football for Hamilton AFC, Waikato Unicol, Western City and Te Awamutu FC before joining Cambridge FC in 2002. She captained Cambridge's women's first team for 12 years before retiring from competitive football in 2014, having helped her team win the Waikato Cup in her final match.

Cambridge FC honoured her long service and achievements by presenting Anderton with a Special Achievement Award in October 2014, noting that in more than 800 competitive games over 35 consecutive seasons she had never received a yellow card or red card.

She was awarded the club's Women's Player of the Year Award for her final season.

Anderton was awarded a Services to Sport Medal at the Waipa Networks District Sports Awards in November 2014 in recognition of her 35 consecutive seasons of competitive football.
