= Te Atatū Peninsula Park =

Park in West Auckland, New Zealand

Coordinates: 36°50′18″S 174°38′36″E

Te Atatū Peninsula Park is a park situated on the Te Atatū Peninsula.

== Facilities ==
Run by the Waitakere City Council, the park is home to the Waitakere Cricket Club, Te Atatu Roosters Softball Club, Touch Waitakere, the Te Atatu Roosters rugby league juniors and also the Te Atatu Association Football Club.

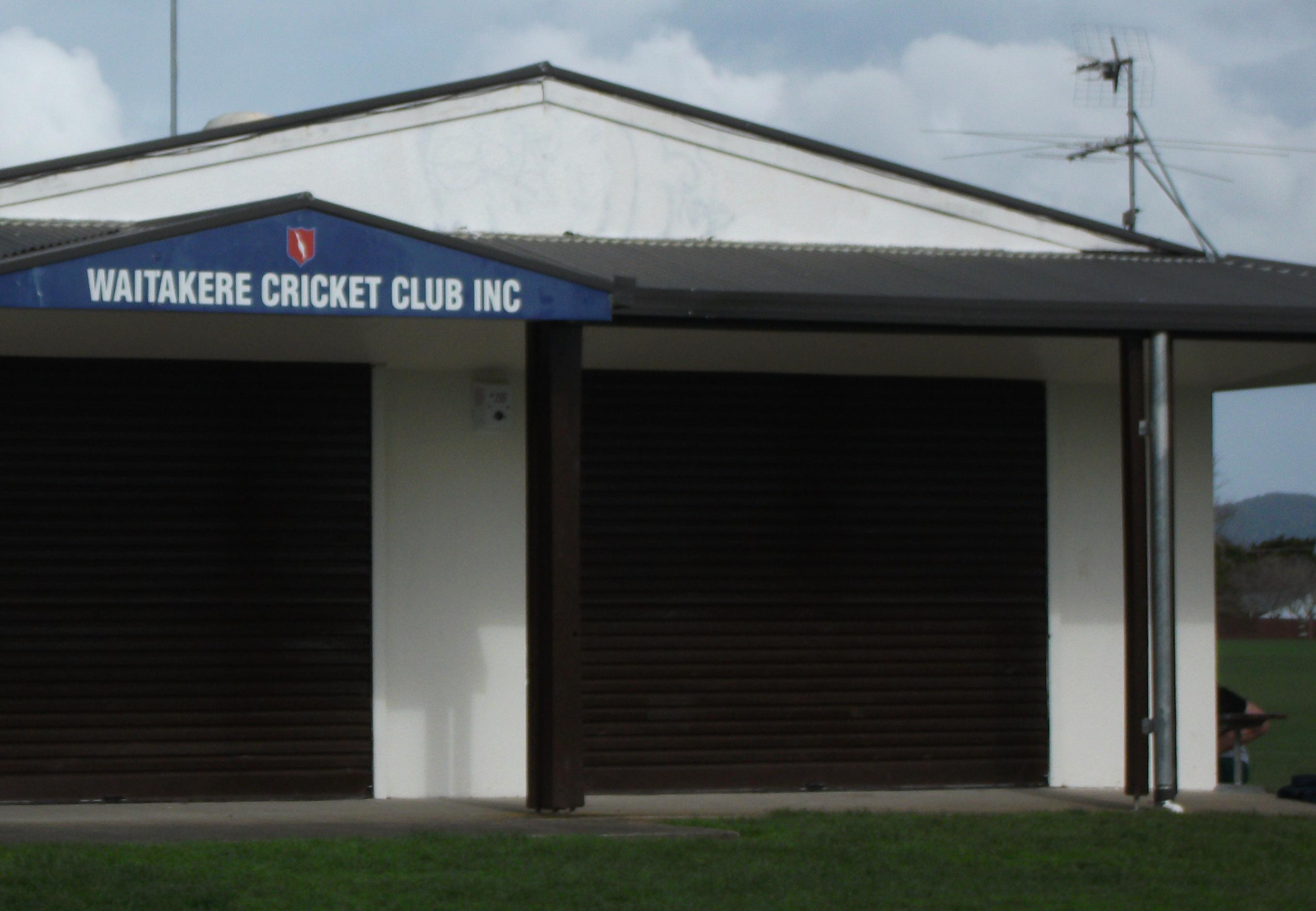

== History ==
The park was created in 1960 as Holman Park. It was then renamed Te Atatu Park before being renamed again as Te Atatū Peninsula Park.

The Te Atatu Roosters were based at the park between 1960 and 1964. The Association Football Club has been there since 1960 and the Waitakere Cricket Club moved in in 1989.

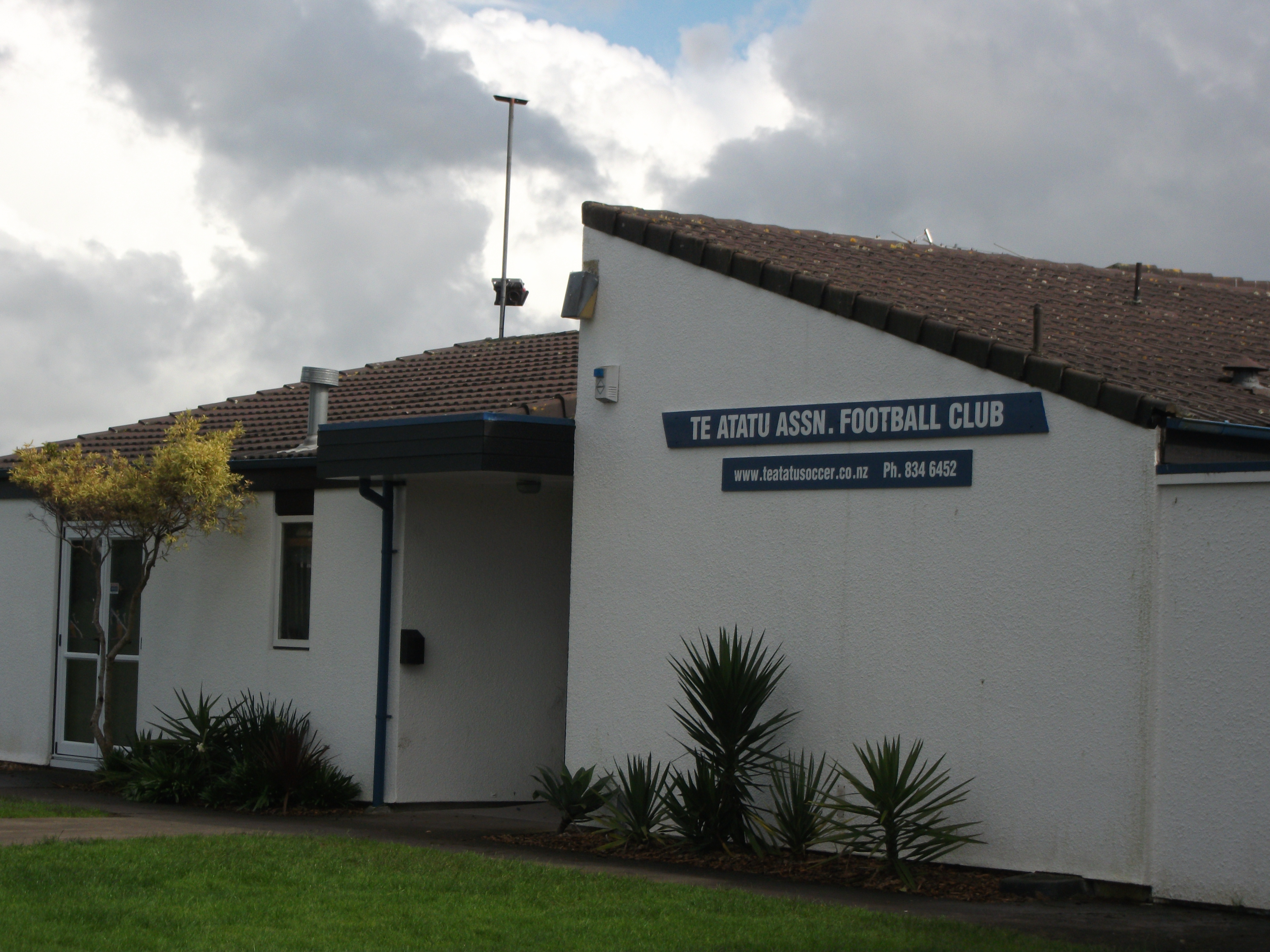
