= NRF League One =

- Country: New Zealand
- Confederation: OFC (Oceania)
- Number of clubs: 8
- Level on pyramid: 5
- Promotion to: NRFL Northern Conference
- Relegation to: NRF Championship Division 1
- Current champions: South Auckland Rangers (2026)
- Website: Northern Region Football
- Current: NRF League One; 2025 NRF League One

The NRF League One is a New Zealand association football league. The league is run by Northern Region Football, an amalgamation of the Auckland Football Federation and Northern Football Federation, and includes football clubs located in Northland and Auckland. It comprises half of the fifth tier of football in the northern North Island, alongside the WaiBOP League One. Up until 2022, the competition was known as the NRF Championship.

The fixtures are played generally from April to September. The league winners are promoted to the NRFL Northern Conference. Until 2022, the second-placed team entered a two-game playoff series with the champions of the WaiBOP Premiership (now WaiBOP League One). Teams can be relegated from this division, however only one can progress into this division and beyond. If teams do not meet the criteria to gain promotion to the NRF Championship, no teams are relegated from this division. The current champions of the 2025 season are Te Atatu, who as a result were promoted to the 2026 NRFL Northern Conference.

== Current Northern League structure ==
- Northern League
- NRFL Championship
- NRFL Northern Conference, NRFL Southern Conference
- NRF League One, WaiBOP League One
- NRF Championship Division 1

== Current clubs ==
As of 2026 season.

Team	Location	Stadium	2025 season
Franklin United	Drury	Drury Sports Grounds	8th in Northern Conference (relegated)
Mangere United	Māngere East, Auckland	Centre Park	7th
Oratia United	Oratia, Auckland	Parrs Park	5th
Papakura City	Papakura, Auckland	McLennan Park	3rd
Papatoetoe	Papatoetoe, Auckland	Murdoch Park	6th
South Auckland Rangers	Flat Bush, Auckland	Rongomai Park	2nd
West Auckland AFC	Kelston, Auckland	Brains Park	8th
Waiheke United	Waiheke Island, Auckland	Onetangi Sports Park	4th
