= Takayuki Omi =

Japanese footballer (born 1982)

Personal information
- Full name: Takayuki Omi
- Date of birth: October 6, 1982 (age 44)
- Place of birth: Ōtsu, Shiga, Japan
- Height: 1.65 m (5 ft 5 in)
- Position: Midfielder

Senior career*
Years	Team	Apps	(Gls)
2005–2006	Shiga F.C.		
2006–2008	Sportfreunde Eisbachtal		
2008–2009	Onehunga Sports		
2009–2010	YoungHeart Manawatu		
2010–2011	Auckland City		
2011	Sydney Olympic		
2011–2012	Air India	17	(2)
- * Club domestic league appearances and goals as of 12:57, 7 May 2009 (UTC)

Takayuki Omi (近江 孝行, Ōmi Takayuki; born October 6, 1982 in Ōtsu, Shiga) is a Japanese footballer who last played for Air India FC.

== Person ==
Started playing soccer in elementary school, at the National High School Football Championship 79th of high school age Kusatsu higashi highschool. Chosen as an excellent tournament player, also elected a member of the expedition Europe. After graduating from high school, go on to Kinki University, when he was a captain of the 4th year.

After graduating from university, across Germany, joined SSV Eintracht Überherrn e. To V..

Currently involved in football do the job for the Japanese in Germany. (From the blog of the person)
