= Te Atatu AFC =

- Full name: Te Atatu Association Football Club
- Founded: 1960
- Ground: Te Atatū Peninsula Park, 39 Neil Avenue, Te Atatū Peninsula, New Zealand
- Capacity: 250
- Chairman: Dave Caples
- Coach: Nathan Christie
- League: NRFL Northern Conference
- 2026: NRFL Northern Conference, 7th of 8
Home colours	Away colours

Te Atatu AFC is an amateur association football club in Te Atatū, New Zealand. The team's home ground is the Te Atatū Peninsula Park, and they compete in the NRFL Northern Conference.

== History ==
They formed in 1960. The teams best run in the Chatham Cup, New Zealand's premier knockout tournament, was in 2016 when they made the final 16 beating Albany United, Oratia United and Waiheke United before losing 1–2 to Three Kings United in the fourth round. The club also made the last thirty-two twice before the 2016 run, first in 1997 and again in 2002.

== Honours ==
=== Men's ===
- Northern League Division Two B Winners
- Northern League Division Four North Winners

=== Women's ===
- AWFA Knockout Shield: Runners-up, 1993
- Northern Premier Women's League: Winners, 1994
- AWFA Knockout Shield: Winners, 1994
- AWFA Champion-of-Champions: Winners, 1994
