= Waitakere Cricket Club =

New Zealand cricket club

Waitakere Cricket Club is a cricket club based in West Auckland. Based at Te Atatū Park on the Te Atatū Peninsula, the club has won the Auckland club championship three times.

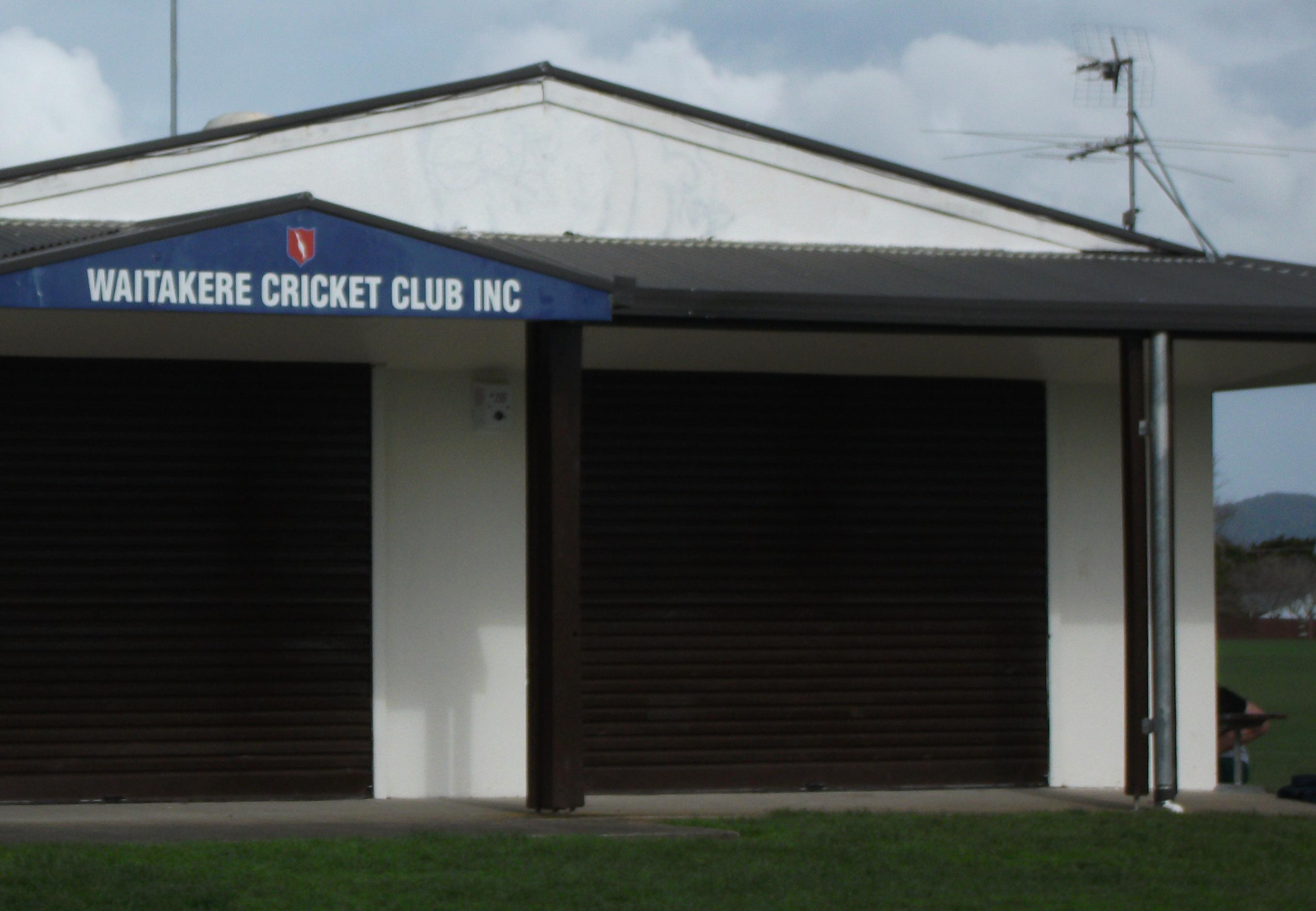
The clubgrounds at Te Atatū Park

== History ==
During the 1971–72 season, the Te Atatu Cricket Club and Henderson Cricket Club amalgamated to form the Western Districts Cricket Club. The club has since been renamed three times, first to become the Waitemata Cricket Club, then the Waitemata Cricket Association Inc, and finally to its present name of the Waitakere Cricket Club.

Originally based at McLeod Road Reserve, the team moved to Te Atatū Park in 1989. The team also has training facilities at the Trusts Stadium.

The club has won the Auckland Cricket club championship three times, in 1989/90, 1994/5 and 1996/7. The club won the Auckland Cricket T20 Championship in 2014

== Events and awards ==
The club hosts an annual Auckland-wide 'Adapted Cricket Open Day' event.

In 2009 the club won the annual New Zealand Cricket 'Best Club Cricket Initiative' Development award. This award was issued mainly for hosting the inaugural Adapted Cricket open day.

The club was also the first in New Zealand to achieve the Halberg Trusts SportAccess Gold status. The award was presented by Sir Murray Halberg in June 2008.

== Notable players ==
Past players include New Zealand internationals Adam Parore, Craig Spearman, Trevor Franklin and Chris Lee, along with Auckland representatives I.H. Laird, Steve Pearson, Ronnie Hira and Anaru Kitchen.
