= Harcourts International =

Australasian real estate company

Harcourts International Limited
- Trade name: Harcourts
- Formerly: Harcourt & Co.
- Type: Private
- Industry: Real Estate
- Founded: 1888, Wellington
- Founder: John Bateman Harcourt
- Headquarters: 31 Amy Johnson Place, Eagle Farm, Brisbane, Australia
- Number of locations: 860 (2024)
- Areas served: Australia, New Zealand, South Africa, China, Hong Kong, Indonesia, Fiji, Mexico, Canada and the USA
- Key people: Mike Green (International MD); Adrian Knowles (CEO AU); Bryan Thomson (MD NZ); Jo Clifford (COO NZ)
- Owners: Privately held
- Parent: HARCOURTS INTERNATIONAL PTY LTD (ultimate holding company)
- Divisions: The Harcourts Foundation
- Subsidiaries: NAI Harcourts; Nutrien Harcourts; Luxury Property Selection
- Website: Harcourts Real Estate

Harcourts (/ˈhɑːrkɔːrts/) is a global Australasian real estate company established in 1888 in Wellington, New Zealand by John Bateman Harcourt.

== History ==
John Bateman Harcourt established the Harcourts real estate company in Wellington, New Zealand, in 1888. From 1874 John had been a partner in the merchant partnership A. P. Stuart & Co., which he bought out in 1879.

Initially, Harcourts focused on the sale of city property, as well as country, seaside, mining, farms and station properties and had a strong auction presence. In its early stages, the company introduced "The Register and Property Investors Guide", the equivalent of Bluebook. It published and circulated about 4,000 copies throughout Wellington monthly.

In 1905, John Bateman Harcourt’s sons Stanton and Gordon joined the company. In 1929, Gordon founded his own company, Gordon Harcourt Ltd, while Stanton headed Harcourt & Co. After Stanton's retirement in the 1950s, Hec Fisher headed the company. In 1980 Harcourt & Co expanded into Auckland and announced listing on the Stock Exchange.

In 1985, the company merged with Collins Real Estate to form Harcourts Real Estate Ltd. and became one of the largest real estate companies in the country.

In 1988, Stephen Collins introduced Harcourts’ current franchise model and made Harcourts a publicly listed company. National Bank of New Zealand was one of the first shareholders. It continued to purchase shares, leading to the return to private ownership. The next year, Tower Corporation purchased the shares from the National Bank. Stephen Collins, in 1992, conducted a management buyout together with Paul Wright, Bob Cooper, and Jo-Anne Clifford.

In 1996, Harcourts stated it launched the first national public searchable online property database. The following year, Harcourts entered the Australian market.

In 2002, it launched Harcourts Academy, a training academy providing courses for sales, management and administration for the real estate industry, which later became an RTO (Registered Training Organisation) of which it still operates today as the Harcourts Real Estate Training Centre.

In 2008, the company launched its own charity, The Harcourts Foundation. Operating in a number of the same markets the Harcourts residential real estate brand does, The Harcourts Foundation has raised millions of dollars in support of more than 1,340 charities, something it continues with today and includes major support for organisations including Gumboot Friday, Hospice New Zealand and Beyond Blue.

In 2020, Harcourts undertook a global rebrand, including updated branding and office presentation.

In 2024, Harcourts introduced the tagline “We make it possible”.

In 2025, Harcourts announced changes to its ownership structure and the New Zealand Gazette publishing notice that Harcourts International Limited intended to apply to be removed from the New Zealand Companies Register in connection with becoming incorporated under the law in force in Australia.

== International expansion ==
Harcourts established branches across New Zealand while simultaneously focusing on expanding into the Australian market. In 1997, former Harcourts franchise owners, Mike and Irene Green, initiated this expansion by establishing a presence in Australia. Within a few years, Harcourts expanded across Australia and later expanded internationally, establishing offices in multiple countries.

== Franchising ==
Stephen Collins introduced Harcourts' franchise model in 1988. Harcourts operates as a franchised real-estate network offering residential, commercial and property management services and operates the Mortgage Express business in New Zealand and Australia.

== Operations ==
Harcourts provides centralized support services to its franchise network, including training, marketing, and technology support.

Harcourts reports over 6,000 team members worldwide and over 860 offices in 11 countries. In 2023, Harcourts transacted $50 billion worth of property and as of 2024, it has $58.8 billion worth of property under management. The company manages over 106,000 properties.

=== Brands ===
The company operates several brands, including Harcourts (residential sales and property management), NAI Harcourts (commercial sales and property investment management specialists), Nutrien Harcourts (rural regional sales and property management specialists), Harcourts Foundation (the charitable arm of Harcourts) and Harcourts Academy.

== Awards ==
Award	Awarded by	Year	Notes
Large Agency Network (Australia) 2025	Rate My Agent	2026	
New Zealand's Most Trusted Real Estate Brand	Reader's Digest Trusted Brands Survey	2013–2026	
Quality Service Award – Real Estate Agencies	Reader's Digest Quality Service Awards	2018–2025	
Australia's Most Recommended Real Estate Agency	Finder Awards	2025	
Various Harcourts franchise offices received honours	Real Estate Institute of New Zealand Awards for Excellence	2023	Awards were presented to individual Harcourts offices and agents rather than parent company Harcourts International.

== Corporate structure and leadership ==
The New Zealand Companies Office record for Harcourts Group Limited (company number 536526) lists its ultimate holding company as HARCOURTS INTERNATIONAL PTY LTD, an Australian proprietary company limited by shares (country of registration: Australia).

Harcourts lists its international corporate leadership as including Mike Green (Managing Director), Leonard Donaldson (Chief Information Officer), Trent Sutton (Chief Marketing Officer), Kelly Podlich (Chief Financial Officer), Mitch Green (Head of People & Culture), Teagan Seccombe (Head of Events) and Karmen Costigan (Head of Property Management) .

== Media coverage ==
In February 2026, Stuff reported that Harcourts Gold Redwood initially declined to disclose a buyer-commissioned building inspection report for a Christchurch auction property to other prospective buyers after the report had been provided to the agency, but later confirmed it would disclose the buyer-commissioned building inspection report after questions from the publication. The article also reported that a complaint about the matter was made to New Zealand's Real Estate Authority, which confirmed it had received a complaint.

== Regulatory proceedings ==
In September 2025, New Zealand's Commerce Commission announced civil proceedings alleging cartel conduct in the Christchurch real estate market involving Harcourts Group Limited and four Harcourts franchisees: Four Seasons Realty 2017 Limited, Gold Real Estate Group Limited, Grenadier Real Estate Limited, and Holmwood Real Estate Limited. The Commerce Commission case register lists the matter as open, with ongoing court proceedings under section 30 of the Commerce Act 1986.

In a 2016 Commerce Commission case involving national real estate agencies, Harcourts Group Limited was one of five agency defendants (along with Barfoot & Thompson Limited, LJ Hooker New Zealand Limited, Ray White (Real Estate) Limited, and Bayley Corporation Limited) in proceedings concerning a price-fixing arrangement related to passing on Trade Me advertising costs to vendors; Harcourts Group Limited was later ordered to pay a penalty of NZ$2.575 million.
