= John Kerkhof Park =

Stadium in Cambridge, New Zealand

- Location within New Zealand
- Interactive map of John Kerkhof Park
- Location: Cambridge, New Zealand
- Coordinates: 37°53′09″S 175°27′18″E

Construction
- Opened: 1948

John Kerkhof Park is a venue for football (soccer) matches in Cambridge, New Zealand. It is the all-year home of Cambridge FC who compete in the Northern League (New Zealand).

The ground was also the training base and home ground for WaiBOP United between 2013 and 2015 when they played in New Zealand's highest level domestic competition, the ASB Premiership.

In 2016, John Kerkhof Park became the training base and home ground for the WaiBOP team in New Zealand's National Women's League, hosting three NWL games in each of the 2016 and 2017 seasons. In 2019, Cambridge was named as the host club for six NWL games and the training base for the WaiBOP team. In 2020, the ground was again named as the host venue for WaiBOP's ISPS Handa Women's Premiership fixtures.

The ground was also used for two National Youth League games and one ISPS Handa Premiership match (between Hamilton Wanderers and Eastern Suburbs) in 2018. In 2019, the ground hosted a national league double header when Hamilton Wanderers played Auckland City in the National Youth League and the ISPS Handa Premiership.

The grounds in Vogel Street, Cambridge, are owned by the Waipa District Council which leases them to Cambridge FC on a long-term basis.

They consist of a premium pitch used for Northern League (New Zealand) and feature games such as national league fixtures, and 25 pitches used for senior, youth and junior games.

For major games, volunteer workers erect a mini-stadium using temporary grandstands and seating, providing a ground capacity for up to about 1,200 spectators, with seating for about 600.

== Venue history ==
Cambridge FC was founded in 1948 and has played at John Kerkhof Park since 1967.

It was named after John Kerkhof, a Dutch immigrant who settled in Cambridge and who with other members of the Kerkhof family built the ground's club and changing room facilities still used today.

In 2008, a tornado caused severe damage to the clubrooms, requiring repairs to the roof, windows and walls.

In 2010, the Cambridge Sevens tournaments for men and women were held for the first time, drawing seven-a-side football teams from around the North Island of New Zealand. The events have since been held annually in late summer.

In 2012, Cambridge FC announced that John Kerkhof Park would become the home base for Cambridge Baseball Club. This was discontinued in 2014 when the baseball club became inactive.

In 2013, Cambridge FC and the neighbouring Cambridge Harriers and Athletics Club began a partnership, enabling the football club to play some games at the adjacent athletics track while it developed John Kerkhof Park.

In 2013, John Kerkhof Park was used to host a series of regionally significant football events including the Soccer Shop Waikato Cup and Plate Finals, an All Stars game between Waikato and Bay of Plenty and an All Stars game for top women's players in the region. This led to the appointment of the venue as the home of national league football for five ASB Premiership fixtures.

In 2014, Cambridge FC announced it would construct an additional building at a cost of $200,000 to provide six more changing rooms for use at the venue.

In 2016, with its new changing facilities operational, the club set a new club record by hosting six senior competition matches in a single day.

John Kerkhof Park hosted the finals of the Soccer Shop men's Waikato Cup and Plate in 2013, 2016, 2017 and 2019. It hosted the women's Waikato Cup and Plate finals in 2016, 2018, and 2019.

National league football returned to Cambridge in 2018 and 2019 when the club hosted matches for ISPS Handa Premiership team Hamilton Wanderers and three of that club's National Youth League fixtures.

In 2018, Cambridge FC formed a three-year partnership with Cambridge Cricket Association to enable junior cricket to be played at the northern end of the grounds.
