= Northern Rovers FC =

- Full name: Northern Rovers Football Club
- Founded: 2020 (6 years ago)
- Ground: McFetridge Park, Glenfield, New Zealand
- Chairman: Dean Dodds
- Manager: Daniel Donegan
- League: Northern League
- 2026: NRFL Championship, 1st of 12 (promoted)
- Website: northernroversfc.org.nz
Home colours	Away colours

Northern Rovers Football Club is a Semi-Professional football club based in Glenfield, New Zealand.

Formed in 2020 as an amalgamation between Glenfield Rovers and Forrest Hill-Milford United, Northern Rovers men's team currently competes in the Northern League, while the women's team competes in the NRFL Premiership which is part of the qualifying leagues for the New Zealand Women's National League.

The club also competes in both the Chatham and Kate Sheppard Cups, New Zealand's premier knockout tournaments for men and women. Both teams received byes in the 2021 Chatham Cup and 2021 Kate Sheppard Cup for the preliminary and first round, along with other ranked teams. The men got their first win of the Chatham Cup when they beat West Hamilton 4–0, however they were deemed to have fielded an ineligible player and the result was overturned. The women's team won their first game 9–1 over Onehunga Sports in the Kate Sheppard Cup.

== Current squad ==
As of 13 June 2021

Note: Flags indicate national team as defined under FIFA eligibility rules; some limited exceptions apply. Players may hold more than one non-FIFA nationality.

No.	Pos.	Nation	Player
—		NZL	Regan Diver
—		NZL	Gareth Lewis
—		NZL	Jack Caunter (captain)
—		NZL	Dion Buckingham
—		NZL	Francis Cain
—		NZL	Luca Burney
—		NZL	Brock Messenger
—		NZL	Cooper Tyler
—		NZL	Mitchell Browne
—		NZL	Jason Quinlan
—		NZL	Ilia Zigheimat

No.	Pos.	Nation	Player
—		IRQ	Yousif Al-Kalisy
—		NZL	Louis Middeldorp
—		NZL	Malcolm Young
—		NZL	Finn Diamond
—		ENG	Miles Palmer
—		ENG	Sam Tutton
—		SOL	Andrew Abba
—		ENG	Adam Dickinson
—		ENG	Jaydyn Englefield
—		IRL	Bronson Kelly
—		NZL	Rayhan Carlson-du Toit
