= Northland FC =

Northland Football Club
- Full name: Northland Football Club
- Founded: 2003; 23 years ago, as North Force AFC; 2016; 10 years ago, as Northland FC
- Ground: Trigg Arena, Kensington, Whangārei
- Capacity: 500
- Chairman: (New Zealand) Trevor Griffiths
- Coach: Michał Wałęsiak
- League: NRFL Northern Conference
- 2026: NRFL Northern Conference, 3rd of 8
- Website: https://northlandfootball.net/
Home colours	Away colours

Northland FC is a football club based in Whangārei, New Zealand. They currently compete in the NRFL Northern Conference.

North Force was set up late in 2003 by Kamo & Tikipunga Football clubs so that a combined team could be entered in either the US1 Federation League or the Northern Federations Football League, and to create a pathway for players to compete at the highest possible levels.

== Club history ==
In 2004 North Force entered a Men’s team in the NFSL 2nd Division, coach Paul Cross (National Academy licence), Won the league and gained promotion into the 1st Division.

2005 – North Force fielded a Reserve Team. This was coached by Jerome Lutien (UEFA licence) with Paul Cross (National Academy licence) again coaching the 1st Team. Both teams finished mid table.

2006 – North Force entered a Women’s team in the US1 JVC League 1st Division, coached by Adam Hayne (National Academy licence) and won the league and the Knock Out Cup and earned the right to apply for a position in the Women’s Northern League competition in 2007.

The NFSL 1st Division Men’s team was coached by Russell Baddeley, Assistant Coach Clive Adams and the Reserve Team was coached by Paul Herbert. Both teams finished mid-table.

2007 – Adam Hayne again coached the Women, who again won the league. The NFSL 1st Division Team was again coached by Paul Cross and Assistant Coach Jerome Lutien. Jerome also coached the Development Team.

Funding was gained allowing the installation of floodlighting on Tikipunga number 9 pitch, which has been set aside for a North Force training pitch.

2006 saw North Force with the following clubs signed as 2nd-tier members:

Kerikeri AFC Madhatters AFC Onerahi Soccer Marist Soccer Central Brown AFC Hora Hora AFC FC Whangarei Paihia AFC

2007– 2008 Season The team finished 3rd, Coach Dean Wheatley (UEFA – A Licence)Assistant Coach – Jerome Luiten Development Team Assistant Coach – Paul Herbert (National Academy licence) Women’s Team Coach – Bruce Plunkett (National Academy licence) 2008/9 Season – Dean Wheatley Football Manager and Coach. (UEFA A Licence, player English Semi professional league) – Squads Men’s (x2), Women(x1), Youth (x2)

– Paul Herbert Development Team Coach (National Academy Licence)

– Adam Hayne Goal Keeper Coach and Assistant Youth Team Coach (National Academy Licence)

– Scott Burgess Youth Squad Coach (National Academy Licence) Senior Men’s team Player, Squad player Waikato FC NZ Football Championship 2007

– Trevor Appledorn Youth Squad Coach (Junior Advanced Licence) Northland Representative Player

– Craig Crawford Youth Squad Coach (Junior Advanced Licence) Northland Representative Player

– Bruce Plunkett Women’s Coach (National Academy Licence) Player English Semi Professional leagues, Player NZ Professional League – Player Chatham Cup Finalist

– Simon Wilkinson Women’s Assistant Coach (Junior Advanced Licence)

– Dee Tunstall Women’s Assistant Player/Coach (National Academy Licence)

In 2016, North Force changed their name to Northland to better reflect the surrounding region the represent while competing in the NRF leagues.

== Present day ==
North Force has incurred huge travelling expenses over the last four years and still requires funding assistance for travel in particular. As Northland’s only elite football entity, players and clubs from Northland are representing Northland as a regional showcase.

Northland is now seeking support from local businesses and funding organizations to build on its success.
