= Franklin United FC =

Franklin United
- Full name: Franklin United
- Founded: 2016; 10 years ago
- Ground: Drury Sports Grounds, Drury
- Capacity: 1,000
- Manager: TBA
- 2026: NRF League One, 5th of 8
- Website: https://www.franklinunited.nz/

Franklin United was a football club based in Drury, New Zealand. They club last competed in the NRF League One.

== History ==
The club were formed in 2016 after a merger between Pukekohe AFC and Waiuku. In 2021, Franklin finished 4th, just missing out on promotion.

The club has competed in the Chatham Cup five times first competing in 2016, with their best appearance being in 2017 and 2019 where they reached the fourth round. In 2017 they were knocked out by Melville United losing 7–1, and in 2019 they lost 8–0 to Eastern Suburbs, making it their worst defeat in the competition.

Franklin also have a women's team who compete in the NRF Championship, after gaining promotion in 2021.

In September 2026, Franklin United announced it was winding down it operations at the end of the 2026 financial year.
