= Cambridge FC =

Cambridge
- Full name: Cambridge Football Club
- Nickname: Reds
- Founded: 1948; 78 years ago
- Ground: John Kerkhof Park, Cambridge
- Capacity: 1,200
- Chairman: Harry Bohmans
- Coach: Jordan Shaw
- League: NRFL Championship
- 2026: NRFL Championship, 9th of 12
- Website: www.cambridgefootball.co.nz
Home colours

Cambridge F.C. is a football club based in Cambridge, New Zealand. The club competes in the NRFL Championship.

In 2020, Cambridge finished 8th in a season shortened by restrictions to combat the COVID-19 pandemic. In 2019, they came 5th in the league. The club had won promotion to the league in 2017 after a two-legged play-off series against Auckland's Beachlands Maraetai.

They were the 2017 and 2015 champions of the WaiBOP Premiership, run by the Waikato/Bay of Plenty Football Federation.

== Club history ==
The club was founded in 1948 and has played at John Kerkhof Park, Cambridge, New Zealand, since 1967. The teams play in red and white, a legacy of the club's first president Vic Butler's support of Arsenal F.C.

== Playing record ==
In 2015, the club won the WaiBOP Premiership and qualified for play-offs to win promotion to the Lotto Sport Italia NRFL Division 2 but lost the two-match series to Auckland champions Waitemata FC.

The club were runners-up in the 2016 WaiBOP Premiership

In 2017, Cambridge won the WaiBOP Premiership and the WaiBOP Championship, the Waikato/Bay of Plenty's top competitions.

The club also retained the WaiBOP Challenge Shield, as well as winning the Waikato Women's League.

Cambridge's U-19 youth team won the 2017 Satellite Final of the National Youth Tournament in Napier.

== Coaches ==
The club appointed the following coaching/management teams for recent seasons:

2014: Norm Rose (coach), Ray Pooley (director of football), Robbie Greenhalgh (assistant coach), Kim Brierley (goalkeeper coach), Shane Ridgway (manager).

2018: Mike Woodlock (coach, retired in May 2018), Paul Richardson (coach, appointed in May 2018), Ray Pooley (assistant coach), Kim Brierley (goalkeeper coach), Chrissy Goodin (team manager).

2019: Paul Richardson (head coach), Fairlie Morton (team manager).

2020: Paul Richardson (head coach), Nicola Brierley (team manager).

2021: Paul Richardson (head coach), Nicola Brierley (team manager).

Since January 2017, former All Whites player and coach Ricki Herbert has been the Technical Director for the club.

In October 2017, the club and the Ricki Herbert Football Academy announced a partnership to run a young player development programme at the Cambridge club.

== Regional and national participation ==
Every summer since 2011, the club has staged the Cambridge Sevens which are one-day tournaments for men's and women's teams drawn from the upper North Island of New Zealand.

In 2013, the club hosted events such as the Soccer Shop Waikato Cup Final, the Waikato v Bay of Plenty All Stars game, and the WaiBOP Women's All Stars v WaiBOP National League side.

After successfully hosting these games, the club was appointed as the home ground for five New Zealand Football Championship matches for new franchise WaiBOP United. This meant Cambridge became one of six bases for national league football in New Zealand (the others are Auckland, Napier, Wellington, Christchurch and Dunedin).

The appointment led to the club becoming an all-year operation, with investment in better facilities including upgraded playing surfaces, new changing rooms and a new irrigation system. In late 2014, WaiBOP United announced Cambridge would continue to be the team's home base with five more premiership matches played in early 2015. For the 2015–16 season, WaiBOP United announced they were moving their home games from Cambridge's John Kerkhof Park to Waikato Stadium to enable a television deal to cover premiership games.

National league football returned to Cambridge in 2018 when the club hosted a match for ISPS Handa Premiership team Hamilton Wanderers and two of that club's National Youth League fixtures. In 2019, the club hosted a national league double header when Hamilton Wanderers played Auckland City in the National Youth League and the ISPS Handa Premiership.

In 2016, the club's John Kerkhof Park became the training base and home ground for the WaiBOP team in New Zealand's National Women's League, hosting three NWL games in each of the 2016 and 2017 seasons. In 2019, Cambridge was named as the host club for six NWL games and the training base for the WaiBOP team. In 2020, the ground was again named as the host venue for WaiBOP's Women's Premiership fixtures.

The club staged its first international match on 25 May 2015 when Hungary and Fiji met in a warm-up match for the 2015 FIFA U-20 World Cup being held in New Zealand.

The club hosted the finals of the Soccer Shop men's Waikato Cup and Plate in 2013, 2016, 2017 and 2019. It hosted the women's Waikato Cup and Plate finals in 2016, 2018 and 2019.

== Achievements ==
The club's first significant off-field achievement was winning Waipa District's Sports Club of the Year award in 2001, an award it won again in 2014 and 2015.

The club's success at hosting regional and national matches led to it winning the Supreme Award at the 2014 Trustpower Waipa District Community Awards, and the club represented Waipa at the national community awards in Wellington in March 2015.

The club had previously won the Trustpower Waipa District Community Awards (Sports) award in 2010. The club won another award for community service in December 2016, the Waikato Community Partnership Award, for its work with those ordered by the courts to perform community work.

In June 2014, the club was named Club of the Year for the Waikato/Bay of Plenty, winning WaiBOP Football's Colin Bell/Ron White Memorial Trophy.

In November 2014, the club was named Sports Club of the Year at the Waipa Networks District Sports Awards and in January 2015 was a finalist for the Waikato Sports Club of the Year. Former club chairman Greg Zeuren was named Sports Administrator of the Year at the Waipa awards and won the Waikato Sports Administrator of the Year title in 2015.

In 2014, the club won two WaiBOP Football Best Practice Awards, for its sponsorship practices and for the participation of women in the club.

The club won the New Zealand Match Programme of the Year Award for 2011, and the publication was highly commended in the awards for 2012 and 2013.

In August 2015, the club was awarded New Zealand Football's Quality Club Mark (QCM), Level 1 Star, which is a quality assurance standard used to measure the proficiency of clubs. Cambridge became one of the first clubs in the Waikato/Bay of Plenty region to attain the QCM.

In November 2015, the club won the Waipa Sports Club of the Year award for the second year in a row.

The club's WaiBOP Premiership-winning first team won the 2017 Waipa Sports Team of the Year award.

Long-serving club president Peter Martens was awarded a Queen's Service Medal for services to football in the 2020 New Year Honours.

In January 2020, the club jointly won (with Cambridge Junior Cricket Association) an award for Innovation in Sport at the Sport Waikato annual awards after forming a ground-sharing partnership with the cricketers.

== International players ==
Probably the club's best known past player is New Zealand international striker Chris Wood.

Full internationals who played their junior football at Cambridge FC include All White Che Bunce and Football Ferns Katie Duncan and Tayla Christensen.

Two New Zealand international women's players, Maria Anderton and Andrea Rogers played senior football for the club with Anderton receiving a Special Achievement Award when retiring from competitive football in 2014 after more than 800 matches. Rogers was named the club's women's Player of the Year for 2017.

Former player Robbie Greenhalgh is a former New Zealand Under 17 player, while one of the club's former junior players, Jamie Woodlock, represented New Zealand at the Oceania Under 17 Championships in January 2015.

Former Cambridge junior and youth player Grace Wisnewski scored three goals at the 2018 U-17 FIFA Women's World Cup in Uruguay in which New Zealand came third at the tournament.

Goalkeeper Patrick Steele has represented New Zealand at futsal, playing for the national U-18 team.

== Notable players ==
Captain Patrick Woodlock was named the WaiBOP Premiership's Player of the Year for 2015 and 2017 and won the club's Jim Barry Player of the Year trophy for the sixth time in 2017, setting a new club record.

== Cup competitions ==
Chatham Cup

Cambridge have reached the third round of New Zealand's oldest cup competition 12 times, the furthest the club has progressed.

Year	Round reached	Result
1972	3rd	Lost 3–2 to Claudelands Rovers
1974	3rd	Lost 7–1 to Hamilton
1984	3rd	Lost 3–1 to Lyndale (Auckland)
1994	3rd	Lost 6–2 to Mount Wellington (Auckland)
1995	3rd	Lost 4–2 to Mount Wellington (Auckland)
1996	3rd	Lost 5–1 to University of Auckland
1999	3rd	Lost 3–2 to Mt Albert-Ponsonby (Auckland)
2004	3rd	Lost 5–1 to Lynn Avon United (Auckland)
2005	3rd	Lost 2–1 to Whakatane Town
2007	3rd	Lost 4–0 to Manurewa (Auckland)
2008	3rd	Lost 1–0 to Forrest Hill-Milford (Auckland)
2014	3rd	Lost 4–2 to Birkenhead United (Auckland)

Waikato Cup and Plate

In 2008, Cambridge won the Waikato Cup.

In 2013, Cambridge were beaten finalists in the Waikato Cup, losing 5–1 to Hamilton Wanderers. The club's C team won the Plate in 2013, beating Waihi 4–3.

Cambridge again reached the final of the Waikato Cup in 2017 when the club's B team lost 2–0 to Otorohanga.

Waikato Women's Cup and Plate

The club's women's first team won the 2014 Waikato Cup. They were beaten finalists in 2013, 2015 and 2018.

The club were runners-up in the 2016 Waikato Plate.

== Tournaments ==
Cambridge's U-19 youth team, won the 2017 Satellite Final of the National Youth Tournament in Napier.

It was the club's first success at the tournament since 2007 when the team won the Satellite Final 2–1 against Dunedin Technical.

In 2006, the Cambridge team won the Satellite Final 1–0 against Ellerslie but were deemed to have breached tournament rules. The squad included future All White Chris Wood and he was ruled ineligible to play at the tournament because he was 14 (and the minimum playing age was 15).

In 2009, Cambridge were beaten 1–0 in the Satellite Final by Dunedin.
