= Waitemata AFC =

Waitemata
- Full name: Waitemata Football Club
- Founded: 1959 (as Western United)
- Ground: McLeod Park, Te Atatū South, New Zealand
- Chairman: Paul Wezenbeek
- Coach: Hamish Mackay
- League: NRFL Northern Conference
- 2026: NRFL Northern Conference, 5th of 8
Home colours	Away colours

Waitemata FC is an amateur football club in Waitemata, Auckland, New Zealand. They compete in the NRFL Northern Conference, and play their home games at McLeod Park, Te Atatū South.

Founded in 1959 as Western United, they changed their name to Henderson in 1968 before changing it again to Waitemata City in 1975.

Their best run in the Chatham Cup, New Zealand's premier knock-out competition was in 1982 and 2011 where they made the last sixteen.
