= Gower Park =

Park and multi-purpose stadium in Hamilton, New Zealand

- Interactive map of Gower Park
- Location: 49 Alison Street, Hamilton Lake, Hamilton, New Zealand
- Coordinates: 37.807315°S 175.272144°E
- Owner: Hamilton City Council
- Operator: Hamilton City Council
- Capacity: 1,000
- Surface: Grass Pitch

Tenant
- Melville United AFC (1981–present)

Website
- Hamilton City Council

Gower Park is a multi-purpose stadium in the Hamilton, New Zealand, suburb of Melville. It is used for football matches and is the home stadium of New Zealand National League and Northern League side Melville United.

== History ==
Gower Park was named after Dr Gower, who worked at Waikato Hospital and was a member of the Hamilton Domain Board.

Melville United moved from their former home, Te Anau Park, to Gower Park in 1981. The club rooms have since been shifted from Kahikatea Drive to their current location on Alison Street, next to the council amenities block.

Since 1990, major clubrooms refurbishment, carpark development, and erection of floodlighting has taken place, along with the construction of seating and perimeter fencing.

In 2011, 56 lights were put in place at the eastern end of Gower Park as part of a floodlight project.

In 2012, the dugouts were upgraded using seating from Eden Park, and a path connecting the western terraces and clubrooms was constructed.

Major renovations of the number 1 pitch were completed in 2014 to prepare for the 2015 FIFA U-20 World Cup. It was used as a training ground throughout that tournament and hosted an international friendly. Melville hosted its first live broadcast game in 2015, a New Zealand Football Championship game between WaiBOP United and Team Wellington.

As of July 2022, Hamilton City Council are planning to upgrade the changing rooms and add some more lighting around the number 1 pitch. Melville United are discussing adding a media box, new club rooms and changing rooms, and a covered seating stand on the western side of the pitch.

In September 2023 FIFA announced that Gower Park would be a venue-specific training site for the 2023 FIFA Women's World Cup. $1,150,000 was split between Waikato Stadium, Porritt Stadium, Gower Park and Korikori Park.

== International matches ==
Gower Park has hosted one international match between Uruguay U-20s and Panama U-20s. This was a friendly game in the build up to the 2015 FIFA U-20 World Cup held in New Zealand.

| 20 May 2015 | Uruguay U-20 | 0–1 | Panama U-20 | Melville |
| | | Report | 82' | Stadium: Gower Park |
