= Waiheke United AFC =

Waiheke United
- Full name: Waiheke United Association Football Club
- Founded: 1987; 39 years ago
- Ground: Onetangi Sports Complex
- League: NRF League One
- 2026: NRF League One, 2nd of 8
- Website: http://www.waihekeunited.org.nz/
Home colours	Away colours

Waiheke United AFC is a football club based at Onetangi Sports Park on Waiheke Island, Auckland, New Zealand. The Senior Men's Team currently play in the NRF League One, having been relegated in 2022.

== History ==
Waiheke United is a New Zealand registered charity and an incorporated society that was formed in 1987 when the local junior and senior teams combined to become Waiheke United AFC. Since its inception the dedication of the club's committee members and volunteers, players and parents has seen the club thrive and grow to become one of the largest sports club on Waiheke Island.

== Teams ==
Waiheke United covers all ages from First Kicks and Fun Football, Junior, youth and Senior men's and women's. The club has one senior Women's team, a senior Men's team, a reserve team, and an over 40's senior social team.

As of September 2017 the senior Men's first team has enjoyed particular success, winning six consecutive promotions - most recently winning promotion to Northern League.

== Players and supporters ==
The senior Men's team is made up of players from a range of nationalities with French, Japanese, Mexican, Uruguayan and Argentinians as well as New Zealanders cited amongst their squad.

Players and supporters from around the world have discovered the club courtesy of the local Waiheke Island tourist industry, which has attracted the attention of youngsters eager to try something different. The Club also attracted significant attention from South America in 2016 after it was featured on ESPN Argentina, who sent a film crew to the island to produce a documentary on why it had become so popular with South Americans. The documentary lead to a big following on the team's Facebook page from South American fans, resulting in the Team now having the third-largest Facebook following in New Zealand Football.

Supporters bring colour and character with them, singing and playing drums. With approximately 50-80 supporters travel to away games bringing banners, whistles, flags, and streamers, creating an atmosphere more typical at a European or South American venue.
