= Oratia United =

- Founded: 1973
- Ground: Parrs Park, Oratia, Auckland, New Zealand
- Chairman: Anthony Sutton
- Coach: Daniel Eisenhut
- League: NRF League One
- 2026: NRF League One, 3rd of 8
- Website: Website

Oratia United AFC is an amateur association football club based in West Auckland, New Zealand. They compete in the NRF League One, at Step 5 of the New Zealand football pyramid. The club's home stadium is Parrs Park, Oratia. The club is also widely known as 'The Tia'. The club traditionally wears green and gold.

== Club history ==
The club was founded as a junior club in 1973, adding its first senior team in 1976. Its first team currently plays in the NRFL League One. The team formerly competed in the northern section of the now-defunct Superclub competition in 1993 and 1994.

The team's best performance in the Chatham Cup, the nation's leading knockout football competition, came in 1989 and 1998 when the team reached the last 16 stage of the competition.
