= Onehunga Sports =

- Full name: Onehunga Sports Football Club
- Nickname: OSFC
- Short name: Sports
- Founded: 1956; 70 years ago
- Ground: Waikaraka Park, Onehunga, New Zealand
- League: NRF Division 2
- 2026: NRF Division 2, 9th of 9
- Website: onehungasports.net
Home colours	Away colours

Onehunga Sports Football Club is an football club based in Onehunga, New Zealand. The club competes in the NRF Division 2.

The club is widely regarded within New Zealand for their strong focus on youth development. In recent years, Onehunga Sports have most notably produced New Zealand internationals Chris Wood, Sarpreet Singh and Alex Paulsen, and former head coach Hiroshi Miyazawa.

== Club history ==
The club was founded in 1956 as Cornwall AFC, originally as a youth-oriented breakaway of Ellerslie AFC; Cornwall began play in the 1957 season, holding home games first at Auckland Domain until Fergusson Domain was made available in 1961. The club's change of name to Onehunga Sports and Soccer Club came in 1986, soon followed by the club's first promotion to the NRFL Premier in 1991.

As Onehunga gradually progressed, gaining promotion into higher divisions, tighter restrictions on the playing surface at Fergusson Domain were placed on the club. Relocation discussions began in 1995, and following the construction of clubrooms and training facilities the club moved to Waikakara Park for the 2004 season.

In 2010, Onehunga Sports won the NRFL Division 1 title, winning promotion to the regional top flight.

In 2017 and 2018, Onehunga Sports won consecutive NRFL Premier titles; 2017 also saw the team lift the Chatham Cup for the first time, defeating Central United in the final.

In 2020, Onehunga Sports merged with Three Kings United to form Auckland United, which assumed Onehunga's position in the 2020 NRFL Premier season; the youth, women's and social sectors of Onehunga Sports remain in operation.

== Notable former players ==
The following players went on to play professionally following their time at Onehunga Sports.

- (Japan) Kohei Tezuka
- (Japan) Takayuki Omi
- (South Korea) Lee Ho-jae
- (South Africa) Liam Jordan
- (Thailand) Sansern Limwattana
- (Thailand) Baramee Limwattana
- (New Zealand) Moses Dyer
- (New Zealand) Sarpreet Singh
- (New Zealand) Chris Wood
- (New Zealand) Max Mata
- (New Zealand) Te Atawhai Hudson-Wihongi
- (New Zealand) Katie Duncan
- (New Zealand) Benjamin Mata
- (New Zealand) Alex Paulsen
- (New Zealand) Priscilla Duncan
- (New Zealand) Mark Elrick
- (New Zealand) Clayton Lewis (footballer)
- (New Zealand) Pip Meo

== Honours ==
- Chatham Cup: 2017
- NRFL Men's Premier winners 2018
- Women's Conference Division Champions 2018.
- NRFL Men's Premier winners 2017
- Lotto NRFL and New Zealand Football 2017 Coach of the Year: Hiroshi Miyazawa.
- Lotto NRFL Men's Premier Division Player of the Year 2017: Joseph Dawkins captain of the Men's Premier team.
- Northern Regional Football community coach of the year 2022: Jannine Stewart

Chatham Cup
Preceded by Birkenhead United	Winner; 2017 Chatham Cup	Succeeded by Birkenhead United
