= Manukau United FC =

Manukau United
- Full name: Manukau United Football Club
- Short name: MUFC
- Founded: 2018
- Ground: Centre Park, Māngere, New Zealand
- Chairman: Hone Fowler
- Manager: Mohammed Asif Khan
- League: Northern League
- 2026: Northern League, 12th of 12
- Website: www.manukauunited.net
Home colours	Away colours

Manukau United is an association football club based in Māngere East, Auckland, New Zealand. Formed through a partnership of Manukau City and Mangere United in 2018, Manukau United currently plays in the Northern League.

== History ==
The club was founded as Massey Rovers AFC at Massey Park, Mangere East in 1964, becoming Manukau City AFC in 1971, growing into a club with 200 people involved across 13 sections.

== Honours ==
- Lotto Sport Italia NRFL Division 2
  - Champions (1): 2016
