= Melville United AFC =

Melville United
- Full name: Melville United Association Football Club
- Founded: 1972 as Melville
- Ground: Gower Park, Hamilton Lake, New Zealand
- Chairman: Wayne Bates
- Manager: Aaron Scott; Harry Trethowan
- League: Northern League
- 2026: Northern League, 9th of 12
- Website: www.melvilleunited.co.nz
| Home colours | Away colours |

Melville United AFC is a New Zealand association football club based in Melville, New Zealand. The club competes in the Northern League.

== History ==
The club was formed in 1996 from the merger of Melville AFC (founded 1972) and Waikato United (founded 1988). The team play at Gower Park, which was previously home to Melville United, and before that Melville AFC. Waikato United had itself been formed as the result of a merger between several local clubs, most notably former Chatham Cup winners Hamilton Technical Old Boys.

== Current squad ==
As of 13 June 2021

Note: Flags indicate national team as defined under FIFA eligibility rules; some limited exceptions apply. Players may hold more than one non-FIFA nationality.

| No. | Pos. | Nation | Player |
|---|---|---|---|
| 1 | GK | NZL | Max Tommy |
| 2 | DF | NZL | Tyler Ericksen |
| 3 | DF | NZL | Ollie Valentine |
| 4 | DF | NZL | Joel McMullan |
| 5 | DF | NZL | Campbell Brown |
| 6 | MF | NZL | Logan Wisnewski |
| 7 | MF | NZL | Ryen Lawrence |
| 8 | MF | NZL | Liam Hayes |
| 9 | FW | COL | Jerson Lagos |
| 10 | MF | NZL | Liam Molloy |

| No. | Pos. | Nation | Player |
|---|---|---|---|
| 11 | MF | NZL | Quinton Kipara |
| 12 | DF | NZL | Raheem Hunter-Ali |
| 13 | FW | NZL | Moh Reynolds |
| 15 | MF | CAM | Lim Lucca |
| 16 | MF | NZL | Sean Leadley |
| 17 | DF | NZL | Lachie McIsaac |
| 19 | FW | NZL | Kieran Richards |
| 21 | MF | NZL | Davis Vhavha |
| 23 | GK | NZL | Conor Jamieson |
| 30 | GK | NZL | Joseph Knowles |

== See also ==
- Northern League
- Chatham Cup
- New Zealand Football
- Waikato United

Chatham Cup
| Preceded by Northern | Winner*; 1962 Chatham Cup | Succeeded by North Shore United |
