= 2017 Chatham Cup =

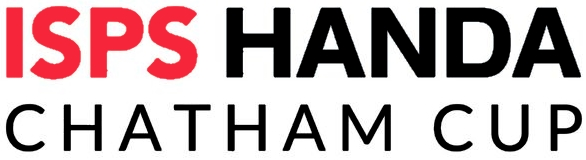

Tournament details
- Country: New Zealand
- Teams: 127

Final positions
- Champions: Onehunga Sports
- Runners-up: Central United

Tournament statistics
- Matches played: 126
- Goals scored: 610 (4.84 per match)

Awards
- Jack Batty Memorial Trophy: Mario Ilich

The 2017 Chatham Cup (known as the ISPS Handa Chatham Cup for sponsorship reasons) was New Zealand's 90th annual knockout football competition.

The 2017 competition had a preliminary round and four rounds proper before quarter-finals, semi-finals, and a final. The final was played on 10 September 2017.

== Results ==
=== Preliminary round ===
All matches were played between 22 and 25 April 2017.

Northern Region

22 April 2017	Waikato Unicol	3–0	Tauranga Old Blues	Jansen Park, Hamilton
14:00	L. Goodwin (2); G. Clark	Report

22 April 2017	Tokoroa	1–4	Cambridge	Strathmore Park, Tokoroa
14:00	Unknown	Report	D. Latham (2); S. Garamonswaym; P. Woodlock

22 April 2017	Taupo AFC	4–1	Otumoetai	Crown Park, Taupō
14:00	F. Smith; E. Smith; N. Field (2)	Report	Unknown

22 April 2017	Matamata Swifts	5–4 (a.e.t.)	Internationale	Matamata Domain, Matamata
14:00	S. Parsonage; S. Masterson; C. Walker (2); R. Avergonzado	Report	Own goal G. O’Callagen; M. Remisch

23 April 2017	Auckland Wanderers	3–1	Te Awamutu	Michaels Avenue, Auckland
14:00	J. Hill; P. Kenei; D. Spencer	Report	J. O'Sullivan

23 April 2017	Kiwi True Blues	4–0	Central Brown	Anderson Park, Auckland
14:00	C. McLeod; M. Gray; J. Cookson (2)	Report

23 April 2017	Rotorua United	1–2	South Auckland Rangers	Neil Hunt Park, Rotorua
14:00	F. Gonzalei	Report	M. Toma; M. Krishna

25 April 2017	Warkworth	2–0	Uni-Mount Bohemian Celtic	Shoesmith Reserve, Auckland
14:00	E. Ruff; T. Pride	Report

25 April 2017	Norwest United	6–2	Waiuku	Huapai Reserve, Auckland
14:00	J. Allison (4); L. Cooper (2)	Report	K. Robbie; L. Chapman

25 April 2017	Northern Wairoa	1–7	Kerikeri	Memorial Park, Wairoa
12:30	M. Lapenmal	Report	T. Obrez (3); E. Rosa; J. Rintoll (2); Own goal

25 April 2017	West Hamilton United	5–2	HNK Auckland	Weka Park, Hamilton
14:00		Report

Central / Capital Region

25 April 2017	Wellington Marist	0–4	Seatoun AFC	Kilbirnie Park, Wellington
14:30		Report	L. Bagshaw; J. Hartshorn (3)

25 April 2017	Naenae	4–0	Eastbourne	Naenae Park, Lower Hutt
14:30	M. Pearce; W. Robinson; A. Jackson; S. Leal	Report

25 April 2017	Napier Marist	2–0	Gisborne Thistle	Bluewater Stadium, Napier
14:00	R. Thurston; D. Baxter	Report

Mainland Region

25 April 2017	FC Nelson	6–1	Wakefield	Guppy Park, Nelson
14:00	W. Olea (3); I. Cunningham; LeBu (pen.); C. Bentez	Report	L. Marshall

Southern Region

25 April 2017	West End	2–0	Thistle (Timaru)	West End Park, Timaru
14:00	C. Thomson; J. Cornejo	Report

=== Round 1 ===
Round 1 matches took place between 13 and 14 May 2017.

Northern Region

13 May 2017	Oratia United	4–1	Kiwi True Blues	Parrs Park, Auckland
14:00	M. Withers (3); M. Graham	Report	M. Gray

13 May 2017	Hibiscus Coast	2–0	Papakura City	Stanmore Bay Park, Auckland
14:00	W. Coy; D. Cyra	Report

13 May 2017	North Shore United	5–1	Metro	Allen Hill Stadium, Auckland
14:00	R. Langworthy; D. Fahy (2); S. Vanneste (2)	Report	C. Kirenga

13 May 2017	Ranui Swanson	4–3 (a.e.t.)	Auckland Wanderers	Starling Park, Auckland
14:00	A. Murch (3); V. Sibobarema	Report	J. Hill; D. Spencer; T. Conboy

13 May 2017	NZ Navy	1–4	Uni-Mount Bohemian Celtic	Bayswater Park, Auckland
14:00	D. Wierenga	Report	P. Constable 24', 74'; T. McLoughlin 45'; A. Forsyth 49'

13 May 2017	Norwest United	2–2 (a.e.t.) (3–4 p)	Beachlands Maraetai	Huapai Reserve, Auckland
14:00	L. Cooper; J. Allison	Report	T. Cleave; M. Giles

13 May 2017	Warkworth	1–2	Albany United	Shoesmith Reserve, Auckland
14:00	A. Thomson	Report	A. Torrero 23'; K. Brophy 24'

13 May 2017	Franklin United	4–0	West Hamilton United	Bledisloe Park, Auckland
14:00	Lindsay (2); Vukica; Abbott	Report

13 May 2017	Lynn-Avon United	2–0	Te Atatu	Ken Maunder Park, Auckland
14:00	B. White; J. Higgins	Report

13 May 2017	Papatoetoe	1–4	Claudelands Rovers	Murdoch Park, Auckland
14:00	T. Edwards	Report	Marquez; M. Manresa; Bussey; Kapa

13 May 2017	Ellerslie	1–3	Melville United	Michaels Avenue, Auckland
15:00	A. Wallace	Report	L. Hayes; S. Dowling; S. Biss

13 May 2017	Bucklands Beach	2–4	Ngongotaha	Lloyd Elsmore Park, Auckland
14:00	I. Harraway (2)	Report	A. Ferguson; A. Pinto (2); H. Simiona

13 May 2017	Manukau City	4–2	Kerikeri	Walter Massey Park, Auckland
14:00	D. Frank; A. Estay (3)	Report	A. Streamer (2)

13 May 2017	Taupō	4–2	South Auckland Rangers	Crown Park, Taupō
14:00	F. Smith (2); J. O'Donoghue; N. Field	Report

13 May 2017	Waikato Unicol	3–2 (a.e.t.)	Mt Albert Ponsonby	Jansen Park, Hamilton
14:00		Report	Black; Konusi

13 May 2017	Cambridge	2–4	Western Springs	John Kerkhof Park, Cambridge
14:00	S. Garmonsway; T. Woutersen	Report	I. Sellars; A. Blake; J. Mathews; D. Farnsworth

13 May 2017	Matamata Swifts	6–0	Onehunga-Mangere United	Matamata Domain, Matamata
14:00	Walker; Masterson; West; Parsonage (2); Raynel	Report

13 May 2017	Waitemata	1–0	Glen Eden Rangers	McLeod Park, Auckland
17:30	H. Al-Badri 63'	Report

14 May 2017	Tauranga City United	4–0	Waiheke United	Links Avenue, Tauranga
14:00	N. Farey (3); C. Kenny	Report

14 May 2017	Mangere United	3–3 (a.e.t.) (2–4 p)	Takapuna	Centre Park, Auckland
14:00	Own goal Khan; Ofosu	Report	Du Toit; Pillay; Nkoy

Central / Capital Region

13 May 2017	Red Sox Manawatu	3–4	Napier Marist	Memorial Park, Palmerston North
14:00	L. Patterson 20'; R. Noble 35'; B. Jackson 43'	Report	T. Tidy 1'; Own goal 9'; J. Murphy 49'; D. DuRoss 67'

13 May 2017	Wanganui Athletic	3–4 (a.e.t.)	New Plymouth Rangers	Wembley Park, Wanganui
14:00	J. Hiri 72'; J. Gilmore 83'; R. Holden 115'	Report	J. Smith 24'; B. Hickling 27'; S. De St Croix 92', 94'

13 May 2017	Naenae	4–1	Seatoun	Naenae Park, Lower Hutt
14:00	T. Hser 14'; C. Sellwood 35'; S. Stratford 45'; M. Glass 70'	Report	D. Silva 87'

13 May 2017	Wainuiomata	0–7	Western Suburbs	Richard Prouse Park, Lower Hutt
14:00		Report	I. Delaney 5', 19', 39'; O. Parker-Price 42', 56' (pen.), 63'; A. Mohammadi 72'

13 May 2017	Stokes Valley	3–4	Tawa	Delaney Park, Lower Hutt
14:00	R. Ellis 15'; B. Hewitt 27'; J. Philp 67'	Report	M. Ramaekers 6', 45' (pen.), 89'; T. Hinder 43'

13 May 2017	Victoria University of Wellington AFC	1–2	Stop Out	Boyd Wilson Turf, Wellington
15:00	T. Parker 81'	Report	S. Henderson 76'; J. Sharp 90+2'

13 May 2017	Petone	3–1	Lower Hutt City	Petone Memorial, Lower Hutt
15:00	B. Feld 52'; H. Stuthridge 82'; Z. Watson 88'	Report	J. Cunniff 22'

13 May 2017	Upper Hutt City	1–0	Kapiti Coast United	Maidstone Park, Upper Hutt
15:00	J. Hinton 5'	Report

13 May 2017	Brooklyn Northern United	1–4	North Wellington	Wakefield Park, Wellington
15:30	C. Borbath 80'	Report	K. Cripps 15', 18', 47'; S. Gillespie 88'

13 May 2017	Island Bay United	3–2 (a.e.t.)	Waterside Karori	Wakefield Park, Wellington
17:30	J. Nellaney 25'; S. Gatward-Smith 50'; Own goal 113'	Report	F. Barbero 36', 65'

14 May 2017	Napier City Rovers	3–1	Havelock North Wanderers	Bluewater Stadium, Napier
14:00	A. Kilkolly (2); J. Stevenson	Report	H. Gregory

Mainland Region

13 May 2017	Central Pirates	3–2	Richmond Athletic	A&P, Blenheim
14:00	H. Pine 51'; S. Boyce 62'; H. Turner 62'	Report	M. Payne; L. Edmondson

13 May 2017	Ferrymead Bays	4–1	Selwyn United	Ferrymead Park, Christchurch
14:00	M. Peers 40'; N. Molijn 70', 86'; G. McIntyre 60'	Report	D. Ede 90+2'

13 May 2017	Cashmere Technical	3–1	Western	Garrick Memorial, Christchurch
14:00	S. Kelly 8'; L. Matthysen 18'; T. Schwarz 88'	Report	D. Grault 88'

13 May 2017	Nomads United	2–1	Christchurch United	English Park, Christchurch
14:00	R. Batty 49'; A. Pitman 86'	Report	H. Finnis 55'

13 May 2017	FC Twenty 11	2–4	Coastal Spirit	Avonhead Park, Christchurch
14:00	J. Richards 36' (pen.); M. White 83'	Report	R. Williams 18'; J. Ball 29'; G. Schumacher 60'; R. Stanley 73'

13 May 2017	Parklands United	1–1 (a.e.t.) (4–3 p)	Halswell United	Parklands Reserve, Christchurch
14:00	K. Kilbride 120+2' (pen.)	Report	S. Palethorpe 104'

13 May 2017	Waimakariri United	1–3	Universities	Kendall Park, Kaiapoi
15:00	H. Sword	Report	C. Baker; H. Bowman; G. Granello

14 May 2017	FC Nelson	1–6	Nelson Suburbs	Guppy Park, Nelson
14:00	N. Crosswell	Report	J. Gough; C. Banks (2); M. Tod-Smith (2); K. Gibson (pen.)

Southern Region

13 May 2017	Grants Braes	1–3	Caversham	Ocean Grove, Dunedin
14:00	L. Mitchell 8'	Report	B. Wade 9'; J. Grove 32'; R. Fleming 51'

13 May 2017	West End	5–2	Queens Park	West End Park, Timaru
14:00	R. Atenas 11'; D. Campbell 36', 66', 88'; T. Cox 71'	Report	M. Burgess 20'; M. England 43'

13 May 2017	Gore Wanderers	2–4	Otago University	Hyde Park, Gore
14:00	F. De Jong 21'; J. Boland 80'	Report	J. Leith 59'; D. Scahill 65', 90+2'; B. Horton 67'

13 May 2017	Green Island	12–0	Waihopai	Sunnyvale Park, Dunedin
14:00	M. Brazier 3', 44', 74'; F. Kelly 26', 90+1'; M. Johnston 41', 45+1', 76', 77', 85'; T. Milton 47'; T. McCallion 60'	Report

13 May 2017	Roslyn-Wakari	6–0	Thistle (Invercargill)	Ellis Park, Dunedin
14:00	L. Sercombe 19'; N. Wilkie 39'; T. Kinghorn 64'; B. Kiore 70', 72'; R. Hulleman 90+1'	Report

13 May 2017	Queenstown Rovers	7–0	Mornington	Queenstown Events Centre, Queenstown
14:00	P. Seda 12'; D. De Souza 33'; E. Gardner 40', 45', 90+1'; J. Kumar 82'	Report

13 May 2017	Dunedin Technical	6–0	Melchester Rovers	Tahuna Park, Dunedin
14:00	T. Peterson 5'; M. Neaverson 21'; K. Bouma-Tucker 22', 72'; G. McCall 31'; C. Higgins 57'	Report

13 May 2017	Northern	7–2	Old Boys	Caledonian Ground, Dunedin
14:00	H. Fraser 17'; T. Simpson 23'; R. Hawken 40', 49'; D. Henderson 59'; L. Greig 72'; E. Watanabe 88'	Report	J. Tucker 9'; M. Gill 78'

=== Round 2 ===
All matches were played on 5 June 2017.

Northern Region

5 June 2017	Waitakere City	4–3 (a.e.t.)	Manukau City	Fred Taylor Park, Auckland
14:00	P. Rhodes 26'; J. Gibbons 86'; S. McDonald 96'; R. Turner 115' (pen.)	Report	E. Chavarria 57'; L. Berlim 78'; A. Estay 107'

5 June 2017	Franklin United	0–0 (a.e.t.) (4–3 p)	Waikato Unicol	Drury Sports Complex, Auckland
14:00		Report

5 June 2017	Taupō	0–4	Western Springs	Crown Park, Taupō
14:00		Report	J. Mathews 41'; D. Farnsworth 42'; O. Browne 79'; J. Quinn 80'	Referee: Andrew Lamberth; Assistant referees: Ashley Wilson; Jared Lamberth

5 June 2017	Takapuna	5–4 (a.e.t.)	Oratia United	Taharoto Park, Auckland
14:00	T. Nkoy 8', 33'; S. Pillay 23'; C. Taylor 55'; M. Dutoit 92'	Report	L. Cain 22', 53'; P. Poletaev 42', 62'

5 June 2017	Waitemata	0–7	Central United	McLeod Park, Auckland
14:00		Report	D. Lausev 8'; M. Dordevic 20', 76'; I. Machuca 37'; M. Bonsu Maro 62', 71', 82'

5 June 2017	Uni-Mount Bohemian Celtic	0–1	Matamata Swifts	Bill McKinlay Park, Auckland
14:00		Report

5 June 2017	Melville United	4–1	Eastern Suburbs	Gower Park, Hamilton
14:00	M. Evans 9', 60', 90'; S. Dowling 17'	Report

5 June 2017	Lynn-Avon United	3–7	East Coast Bays	Ken Maunder Park, Auckland
14:00	J. Higgins 24'; L. Smee 45+1'; M. Bilbee 74'	Report	Z. Olla (3); D. Barnett (2); D. Mulligan; T. Damon

5 June 2017	Ranui Swanson	0–2	Three Kings United	Starling Park, Auckland
14:00		Report	S. Wallace; E. Sillars

5 June 2017	Manurewa	0–1	Hamilton Wanderers	Memorial Park, Auckland
14:00		Report	Own goal

5 June 2017	Ngongotaha	5–1	Beachlands Maraetai	Stembridge Road, Ngongotaha
14:00	H. Simiona 37'; A. Pinto 41'; J. O'Sullivan 47'; S. Te Kiri 78', 84'	Report	Z. Christensen 24'

5 June 2017	Claudelands Rovers	1–5	North Shore United	Galloway Park, Hamilton
14:00	K. Surgison 38'	Report	J. Shields 31'; R. Langworthy 74', 75', 82'; D. Fahy

5 June 2017	Forrest Hill Milford United	1–3	Bay Olympic	Becroft Park, Auckland
14:00	R. Morrow 88'	Report	N. Ordenwitz 30'; J. Collett 48'; J. Colligan 90+3'

5 June 2017	Onehunga Sports	6–1	Tauranga City United	Waikaraka Park, Auckland
14:00	J. Porter 43'; S. Lovemore 53', 88'; C. Opperman 60'; A. Milne 65'; W. Jones 90+2'	Report	N. Monne 59'

5 June 2017	Glenfield Rovers	0–4	Birkenhead United	McFetridge Park, Auckland
14:00		Report	Y. Ohtsuka 8'; R. Cain 37'; E. Galbraith 65'; C. Gray 85'

5 June 2017	Albany United	0–1	Hibiscus Coast	Rosedale Park, Auckland
14:00		Report	T. Dale 51'

Capital / Central Region

5 June 2017	Western Suburbs	7–1	Napier Marist	Endeavour Park, Porirua
14:00	O. Parker-Price 24', 83'; I. Delaney 32', 40', 66', 72'; E. Just 75'	Report	M. Dick 70'

5 June 2017	Wellington United	2–4	Miramar Rangers	Newtown Park, Wellington
14:00	O. Valentine 46'; W. Ebbinge 65'	Report	J. Stevens 13', 83'; N. Kirwan 29'; S. Halpin 68' (pen.)

5 June 2017	North Wellington	2–1	New Plymouth Rangers	Alex Moore Park, Wellington
14:00	J. Waayer 29'; K. Cripps 70'	Report	V. Hoskin 42'

5 June 2017	Island Bay United	2–4	Wairarapa United	Wakefield Park, Wellington
14:00	I. O'Hara; Own goal	Report	D. Allan; S. Mason-Smith; B. Kaltack; P. Ifill

5 June 2017	Stop Out	5–1	Palmerston North Marist	Hutt Park, Lower Hutt
14:00	C.Peverley 7'; L. Grindlay 14'; J. Tuck 43'; S. Gulley 47'; J. Gulley 65'	Report	R. Janes 3'

5 June 2017	Napier City Rovers	2–1	Wellington Olympic	Bluewater Stadium, Napier
14:00	R. Willox 6'; A. Kilkolly 32'	Report	S. Blackburn 49'

5 June 2017	Upper Hutt City	1–3	Tawa	Maidstone Park, Upper Hutt
14:00	J. Fong 10'	Report	O. Story 5', 6'; A. Magill 85'

5 June 2017	Petone	5–0	Naenae	Petone Memorial Park, Lower Hutt
14:00	A. Shepherd-Reynolds (3); M. Blair; A. Nazari	Report

Mainland Region

5 June 2017	Nelson Suburbs	5–0	Central Pirates	Saxton Fields, Nelson
13:00	B. Wright 5'; M. Tod-Smith 31'; M. Winterton 45+1'; R. Pearon 78'; K. Gibson 80' (pen.)	Report

5 June 2017	Universities	0–5	Coastal Spirit	Ilam Fields, Christchurch
13:00		Report	J. Ball 13' (pen.), 19', 64'; S. Orritt 30'; L. Hare 52'

5 June 2017	Cashmere Technical	8–0	Parklands United	Garrick Memorial Park, Christchurch
14:00	S. Kelly 4', 32', 41'; L. Mathysen 8', 40'; G. Ogilvie 53'; D. Schwarz 68'; B. Howes 88'	Report

5 June 2017	Ferrymead Bays	0–0 (a.e.t.) (6–7 p)	Nomads United	Ferrymead Park, Christchurch
14:00		Report

Southern Region

5 June 2017	Roslyn-Wakari	0–1	Queenstown Rovers	Ellis Park, Dunedin
14:00		Report	C. Herman 49'

5 June 2017	Green Island	3–1	Northern	Sunnyvale Park, Dunedin
14:00	M. Brazier 58'; H. Viana 69', 72'	Report	R. Hawkin 61'

5 June 2017	Dunedin Technical	6–0	West End	Tahuna Park, Dunedin
14:00	K. Bouma-Tucker 28', 47'; T. Peterson 33'; A. Watson 55'; M. Bergin 57'; G. McCall 86'	Report

5 June 2017	Caversham	4–0	Otago University	Tonga Park, Dunedin
14:00	S. Collier 24'; A. Ridden 53', 62'; J. Grove 72'	Report

=== Round 3 ===
The draw for Round 3 fixtures took place on 7 June, with matches played between 24 and 25 June.

Northern Region

24 June 2017	Takapuna	1–4	Central United	Taharoto Park, Auckland
14:00	J. McKay 67'		N. Zambrano 50', 74'; R. Murati 61'; D. Lausev 68'

24 June 2017	Three Kings United	12–0	Ngongotaha	Keith Hay Park, Auckland
14:00	A. Pearce 2', 13', 18', 51'; T. Picken 39'; S. Peckham 47'; M. Nash 53'; B. Totori 63', 66', 87'; S. Khan 70'; W. Hunt 89'

24 June 2017	Melville United	7–1	Franklin United	Gower Park, Hamilton
14:00	E. Seekie 7'; S. Holloway 17'; P. Hinchcliffe 30', 52'; M. Evans 46', 78', 87'		M. Fifi'i 29'

24 June 2017	Hibiscus Coast	1–5	Onehunga Sports	Stanmore Bay Park, Auckland
14:00	J. Barnett 10'		R. Haviland 52'; J. Caunter 54'; B. Ozawa 55'; J. Vale 76'; C. Opperman 77'

24 June 2017	Hamilton Wanderers	2–2 (a.e.t.) (2–4 p)	Bay Olympic	Porritt Stadium, Hamilton
14:00	H. Stephen 14'; Z. Newdick 38'		J. Colligan 81'; A. Sahib 85'

24 June 2017	East Coast Bays	1–3	Birkenhead United	Bay City Park, Auckland
14:00	D. Barnett 41'		J. Salter 22', 66'; D. Parkinson 36'

24 June 2017	Waitakere City	3–4	Western Springs	Fred Taylor Park, Auckland
14:00	P. Rhodes 22'; D. Manickum 72'; R. Turner 85'		A. Dickinson 27' (pen.), 46', 89'; L. Imrie 36'

24 June 2017	Matamata Swifts	0–2	North Shore United	Matamata Domain, Matamata
14:00			Own goal 15'; H. Kadiya 42'

Central / Capital Region

24 June 2017	Miramar Rangers	3–0	Tawa	David Farrington Park, Wellington
14:00	N. Kirwan 21'; M. Bredeveldt 30'; F. Norrington 80'

24 June 2017	Stop Out	3–2	North Wellington	Hutt Park, Lower Hutt
14:00	S. Gulley 31'; L. Grindlay 52'; J. Tuck 66'		J. Waayer 2'; K. Cripps 81'

24 June 2017	Petone	0–7	Western Suburbs	Memorial Park, Lower Hutt
15:00			X. Green 16'; C. McCowatt 21'; O. Parker-Price 29' (pen.), 47'; I. Delaney 73'; N. Billingsley 87'; D. Wooldridge 90+2'

25 June 2017	Napier City Rovers	4–5 (a.e.t.)	Wairarapa United	Bluewater Stadium, Napier
14:00	J. Stevenson 57'; R. Willox 72'; A. Kilkolly 75', 116'		P. Ifill 45' (pen.), 60'; E. Hajdari 69', 91'; S. Soromon 98'

Mainland / Southern Region

24 June 2017	Cashmere Technical	7–0	Nomads United	Garrick Park, Christchurch
14:00	L. Mathesen 23', 57', 77'; G. Ogilvie 30', 75'; T. Schwarz 63' (pen.); B. Stroud 87'

24 June 2017	Dunedin Technical	2–3	Queenstown Rovers	Tahuna Park, Dunedin
14:00	M. Neaverson 17'; T. McLennan 71'		C. Herrmann 14', 28', 35'

24 June 2017	Caversham	2–1	Green Island	Tonga Park, Dunedin
14:00	M. Hogan 77'; J. Grove 88'		M. Johnston 63'

25 June 2017	Nelson Suburbs	1–0	Coastal Spirit	Saxton Fields, Nelson
13:00	R. McPhie 39'

=== Round 4 ===
Round 4 was played between 15 and 16 July. The draw took place on 27 June.

Northern Region

15 July 2017	Three Kings United	1–2	Birkenhead United	Keith Hay Park, Auckland
14:00	Pearce 51'		Darkwa 59'; Salter 71'

15 July 2017	Onehunga Sports	1–0	Melville United	Waikaraka Park, Auckland
14:00	Milne

15 July 2017	Western Springs	2–3	Bay Olympic	Seddon Fields, Auckland
17:15	Dickinson 10', 88'		Collett 15' (pen.); Colligan 69', 73'

16 July 2017	Central United	4–0	North Shore United	Kiwitea Street, Auckland
14:00	Tade 63'; Zambrano 66'; Ilich 86', 88'

Capital / Central Region

15 July 2017	Stop Out	1–5	Western Suburbs	Hutt Park, Lower Hutt
14:00

15 July 2017	Wairarapa United	2–1	Miramar Rangers	Memorial Park, Masterton
17:30

Mainland / Southern Region

15 July 2017	Cashmere Technical	2–0	Caversham	Garrick Memorial Park, Christchurch
14:00

15 July 2017	Queenstown Rovers	1–6	Nelson Suburbs	Queenstown Events Centre, Queenstown
14:00

=== Quarter-finals ===
The quarter-finals were played between 5–6 August.

5 August 2017	Western Suburbs	1–2	Bay Olympic	Endeavour Park, Porirua
14:00	Parker-Price 41' (pen.)	Report	Hindson 32'; Collett 57'

6 August 2017	Nelson Suburbs	0–3	Cashmere Technical	Saxton Field, Nelson
13:00		Report	Boys 29'; Ogilvie 87'; Matthysen 90+2'

6 August 2017	Central United	2–0	Wairarapa United	Kiwitea Street, Auckland
14:00	Lausev 84'; Tade 90+3'	Report

6 August 2017	Birkenhead United	0–3	Onehunga Sports	Shepherds Park, Auckland
14:00		Report	Lovemore 45+2'; Milne 90+2' (pen.); Vale 90+5'

=== Semi-finals ===
The semi-finals were played between 26 and 27 August.

26 August 2017	Central United	5–0	Bay Olympic	Kiwitea Street, Auckland
14:00	Machuca 30', 68'; Zambrano 61'; Tade 64'; Rogers 88'	Report

27 August 2017	Cashmere Technical	0–3	Onehunga Sports	Garrick Memorial Park, Christchurch
14:00		Report	Opperman 34'; Boss 57'; Mata 72'

=== Final ===
The final took place on 10 September 2017.

10 September 2017
15:30

Central United	3–3 (a.e.t.)	Onehunga Sports
Zambrano 20'; Ryder 71', 78'	Report	Lovemore 59'; Leabourn-Boss 72', 81'
Penalties
Tade (penalty scored); Ilich (penalty scored); Berlanga (penalty scored); Drake (penalty scored); Đorđević (penalty scored); Riera (penalty missed)	5–6	(penalty scored) Mata; (penalty scored) Milne; (penalty scored) Vale; (penalty scored) Caunter; (penalty scored) Haviland; (penalty scored) Opperman

QBE Stadium, Auckland
Referee: Campbell-Kirk Kawana-Waugh
