= 2013 Chatham Cup =

Tournament details
- Country: New Zealand
- Venue(s): English Park, Christchurch
- Dates: 25 April 2013 – 15 September 2013
- Teams: 132

Final positions
- Champions: Cashmere Technical (3rd title); First win was as Christchurch Technical in 1948
- Runners-up: Waitakere City

Awards
- Jack Batty Memorial Cup: Andy Pitman (Cashmere Technical)

The 2013 ASB Chatham Cup was New Zealand's 86th knockout football competition.

The 2013 competition had a qualification round and four rounds proper, before quarter-finals, semi-finals, and a final. Competition was run in three regions (Northern, Central, Southern) until the quarter-finals, from which stage the draw was open. In all, 132 teams entered the competition.

== The 2013 final ==
The final was played in front of a crowd of 2,000 spectators. Cashmere Technical took an early lead in the 5th minute when Julyan Collett was fouled in the penalty area and Danny Boys sent Waitakere City goalkeeper Eamon Goodin the wrong way. The lead was short lived when just 10 minutes later, Cashmere conceded their first and what would be their only goal of the whole campaign. Waitakere won a free kick 25 metres out and Jake Butler lined up his shot. It went straight into the defensive wall but from the rebound his follow up put the ball past Cashmere keeper Shaun Roberts. It didn't take long for Cashmere to restore there lead when Stu Kelly was rewarded for his hard work, slotting the ball home in the 23rd minute. From there both teams had their chances but the result was finally put beyond doubt in injury time when, spotting the keeper off his line, Dan Ede put in a deft long-range lob and the game finished 3–1.

The Jack Batty Memorial Cup for the final's most valuable player was awarded to Cashmere Technical's Andy Pitman.

== Results ==
=== Qualification round ===
All fixtures, results and dates are taken from the following sources: The Ultimate New Zealand Soccer Website, RSSSF, Capital Football Season Review, and New Zealand Football.

Northern region

25 April 2013	Puhoi Wolfpack	2–1	South Auckland Rangers	Puhoi Domain, Rodney
14:00

25 April 2013	Glen Eden United	0–4	Drury United	Parrs Park, Auckland
14:00

25 April 2013	Bohemian Celtic	3–1	St Peter's College
14:00

25 April 2013	Tauranga Old Blues	6–1	West Hamilton United
14:00

25 April 2013	Ranui Swanson	3–2	Tikipunga	Starling Park, West Auckland
14:00

25 April 2013	Waikato Unicol	2–0	Papatoetoe United	Jansen Park, Hamilton
14:00

25 April 2013	Te Atatu	2–1	Zamantix Rovers	Te Atatū Peninsula Park, Auckland
14:00

25 April 2013	Te Awamutu	0–4	Whakatane Town	Te Awamutu Stadium, Te Awamutu
14:00

25 April 2013	AFC Fury	5–0	Morrinsville
14:00

25 April 2013	High School Old Boys Football Club	0–1	Beachlands Maraetai
14:00

25 April 2013	Cambridge	8–0	Nixon Park	John Kerkhof Park, Cambridge
14:00

25 April 2013	Westlake BHS	5–3	Kerikeri
14:00

25 April 2013	Bucklands Beach	0–11	Waitemata	Lloyd Elsmore Park, Pakuranga Heights
14:00

25 April 2013	Norwest United	1–2	West Auckland	Huapai Domain, Kumeū
14:00

25 April 2013	Ngongotaha	4–2	Rotorua United	Tamarahi Reserve, Ngongotahā
14:00

25 April 2013	Taupo AFC	3–2	Waitakere Rangers	Crown Reserve, Taupō
14:00

Central region

25 April 2013	North End	0–5	New Plymouth Rangers	Skoglund Park, Palmerston North
14:00

Southern region

25 April 2013	Central Pirates	3–1	Wakefield
14:00

All teams listed below received byes to the first round.

Northern: Air Force, Hukanui Rototuna, Navy, Papakura City, Pukekohe.
Central: FC Western, Napier City Rovers, Inglewood, Palmerston North Marist, Red Sox Manawatu, Taradale, Wanganui City.
Southern: FC Nelson, Nelson College, Richmond Athletic.

All teams listed below were seeded to the first round.

Northern: Albany United, Claudelands Rovers, Eastern Suburbs, Fencibles, Forrest Hill Milford, Glenfield Rovers, Hibiscus Coast, Lynn Avon United, Mangere United, Manukau City, Melville United, Metro, Mt Albert Ponsonby, Ngaruawahia United, North Shore United, Onehunga Mangere United, Oratia United, Papatoetoe, Takapuna, Tauranga City United, Waiuku, Warkworth, Western Springs.
Central: Brooklyn Northern United, Eastbourne, Greytown, Island Bay United, Kapiti Coast United, Lower Hutt City, Marist, Miramar Rangers, Naenae, North Wellington, Olympic, Petone, Seatoun, Stokes Valley, Stop Out, Tawa, Upper Hutt City, Victoria University, Wainuiomata, Wairarapa United, Waterside Karori, Wellington College, Wellington United, Western Suburbs.
Southern: Coastal Spirit, FC Twenty 11, Grants Braes, Green Island, Halswell United, Melchester Rovers, Mosgiel, Nomads United, Northern, Northern Hearts, Old Boys, Otago University, Queens Park, Roslyn Wakari, Selwyn United, Southend United, Universities, Waihopai, Waimak United, Western AFC.

All teams listed below were seeded to the second round.

Northern: Bay Olympic, Birkenhead United, Central United, East Coast Bays, Ellerslie, Hamilton Wanderers, Manurewa, Onehunga Sports, Three Kings United, Waitakere City.
Southern: Cashmere Technical, Caversham, Dunedin Technical, Ferrymead Bays.

=== Round 1 ===
All fixtures, results and dates are taken from the following sources: The Ultimate New Zealand Soccer Website, RSSSF, Capital Football Season Review and New Zealand Football.

Northern region

11/12 May 2013	Beachlands Maraetai	2–3	Air Force

11/12 May 2013	Cambridge	1–1 (a.e.t.) (4–2 p)	Lynn-Avon United	John Kerkhof Park, Cambridge

11/12 May 2013	Drury United	0–7	Albany United

11/12 May 2013	Eastern Suburbs	5–0	Oratia United	Madills Farm, Auckland

11/12 May 2013	Fencibles United	6–2	Navy	Riverhills Domain, Auckland

11/12 May 2013	Forrest Hill Milford United	5–3	Waiuku	Becroft Park, North Shore

11/12 May 2013	Glenfield Rovers	10–0	Te Atatu	McFetridge Park, North Shore

11/12 May 2013	Hibiscus Coast	4–0	Bohemian Celtic	Stanmore Bay Park, Whangaparaoa

11/12 May 2013	Melville United	2–1	Ngongotaha	Gower Park, Hamilton

11/12 May 2013	Mt Albert Ponsonby	2–3	Papatoetoe	Anderson Park, Auckland

11/12 May 2013	Old Blues	5–1	Hukanui Rototuna

11/12 May 2013	Papakura City	5–0	Puhoi Wolfpack	McLennan Park, Auckland

11/12 May 2013	Pukekohe	1–5	Mangere United	Bledisloe Park, Pukekohe

11/12 May 2013	Takapuna	8–4	Claudelands Rovers	Taharoto Park, Takapuna

11/12 May 2013	Taupo	2–1	Metro	Crown Reserve, Taupō

11/12 May 2013	Waikato Unicol	2–4	Ngaruawahia United	Jansen Park, Hamilton

11/12 May 2013	Waitemata	3–0	Tauranga City	McLeod Park, Te Atatū South

11/12 May 2013	Warkworth	0–1	Western Springs	Shoesmith Domain, Warkworth

11/12 May 2013	West Auckland	0–3	Onehunga-Mangere United	Brains Park, Auckland

11/12 May 2013	Westlake Boys High School	7–0	Manukau City

11/12 May 2013	Whakatane Town	1–4	Fury

11/12 May 2013	North Shore United	3–2	Ranui Swanson	Allen Hill Stadium, North Shore

Central region

11/12 May 2013	Eastbourne	0–3	Naenae	Bishop Park, Lower Hutt

11/12 May 2013	Greytown	4–10	Brooklyn Northern United

11/12 May 2013	Inglewood	5–1	Wanganui City

11/12 May 2013	Island Bay United	4–0	Kapiti Coast United	Wakefield Park, Wellington

11/12 May 2013	New Plymouth Rangers	2–1	Western	Merrilands Domain, New Plymouth

11/12 May 2013	Petone	4–0	Victoria University

11/12 May 2013	Red Sox Manawatu	1–3	Napier City Rovers	Arena Manawatu

11/12 May 2013	Seatoun	1–3	Tawa	Seatoun Park, Wellington

11/12 May 2013	Stokes Valley	0–11	Lower Hutt City	Delaney Park, Lower Hutt

11/12 May 2013	Taradale	1–3	Palmerston North Marist

11/12 May 2013	Upper Hutt City	1–2	Miramar Rangers	Maidstone Park, Upper Hutt

11/12 May 2013	Wainuiomata	1–0	Western Suburbs	Richard Prouse Park, Lower Hutt

11/12 May 2013	Waterside Karori	3–0	North Wellington	Karori Park, Wellington

11/12 May 2013	Wellington College	0–4	Stop Out

11/12 May 2013	Wellington Olympic	7–2	Wellington Marist	Wakefield Park, Wellington

11/12 May 2013	Wairarapa United	2–1	Wellington United	Memorial Park, Masterton

Southern region

11/12 May 2013	Canterbury University	4–1*	FC Twenty 11	Ilam Field, Christchurch

11/12 May 2013	Central Pirates	2–1	FC Nelson

11/12 May 2013	Coastal Spirit	0–3	Western	Cuthberts Green, Christchurch

11/12 May 2013	Old Boys	2–0	Mosgiel	Waverley Park, Invercargill

11/12 May 2013	Melchester Rovers	0–13	Roslyn-Wakari	Caledonian Ground, Dunedin

11/12 May 2013	Nomads United	0–2	Halswell United	Tulett Park, Christchurch

11/12 May 2013	Northern	4–2	Green Island	The Gardens, Dunedin

11/12 May 2013	Otago University	3–0	Northern Hearts	Caledonian Ground, Dunedin

11/12 May 2013	Queens Park	7–1	Southend United	Queen’s Park, Invercargill

11/12 May 2013	Richmond Athletic	0–1	Nelson College	Jubilee Park, Richmond

11/12 May 2013	Waihopai	0–1	Grants Braes	Surrey Park, Invercargill

11/12 May 2013	Waimakariri United	3–0	Selwyn United	Rangiora A&P Showgrounds, Rangiora

*both sides used unregistered players and were disqualified

=== Round 2 ===
All fixtures, results and dates are taken from the following sources: The Ultimate New Zealand Soccer Website, RSSSF, Capital Football Season Review and New Zealand Football.

Northern region

1 June 2013	Hibiscus Coast	1–3	Melville United	Stanmore Bay Park, Whangaparaoa

1 June 2013	Manurewa	6–2	Old Blues	War Memorial Park, Auckland

1 June 2013	Fury	0–6	East Coast Bays

1 June 2013	Forrest Hill Milford United	1–2	Mangere United	Becroft Park, North Shore

1 June 2013	Onehunga Sports	4–1	Waitemata	Waikaraka Park, Auckland

1 June 2013	Albany United	1–5	Hamilton Wanderers	Rosedale Park, Auckland

1 June 2013	Takapuna	1–4	Waitakere City	Taharoto Park, Takapuna

1 June 2013	Eastern Suburbs	0–3	Fencibles United	Madills Farm, Auckland

1 June 2013	Ngaruawahia United	5–4	North Shore United	Centennial Park, Ngaruawahia

1 June 2013	Cambridge	2–4	Birkenhead United	John Kerkhof Park, Cambridge

1 June 2013	Air Force	0–6	Glenfield Rovers

1 June 2013	Ellerslie	2–1	Central United	Michaels Avenue Reserve, Ellerslie

1 June 2013	Onehunga-Mangere United	1–0	Western Springs	Māngere Domain, Māngere

1 June 2013	Papakura City	0–4	Bay Olympic	McLennan Park, Auckland

1 June 2013	Three Kings United	3–0	Taupo	Keith Hay Park, Auckland

1 June 2013	Papatoetoe	4–4 (a.e.t.) (4–3 p)	Westlake Boys High School	Murdoch Park, Papatoetoe

Central region

1 June 2013	Island Bay United	7–3	Brooklyn Northern United	Wakefield Park, Wellington

1 June 2013	Miramar Rangers	1–2	Wairarapa United	David Farrington Park, Wellington

1 June 2013	Naenae	0–4	Palmerston North Marist	Naenae Park, Lower Hutt

1 June 2013	Inglewood	2–3	Tawa

1 June 2013	Napier City Rovers	7–0	Wainuiomata	Bluewater Stadium, Napier

1 June 2013	New Plymouth Rangers	2–5	Lower Hutt City	Merrilands Domain, New Plymouth

1 June 2013	Petone	1–3	Wellington Olympic	Memorial Park, Lower Hutt

1 June 2013	Waterside Karori	6–0	Stop Out	Karori Park, Wellington

Southern region

1 June 2013	Central Pirates	0–1	Nelson College

1 June 2013	Halswell United	0–1	Cashmere Technical	Halswell Domain, Christchurch

1 June 2013	Western	2–5	Ferrymead Bays	Westminster Park, Christchurch

1 June 2013	Waimakariri United	WBD*
Note: * Canterbury University and FC Twenty where both disqualified in the previous round after each team used unregistered players

1 June 2013	Queens Park	2–3	Roslyn-Wakari	Queen’s Park, Invercargill

1 June 2013	Caversham	3–2	Old Boys	Tonga Park, Dunedin

1 June 2013	Dunedin Technical	4–1	Grants Braes	Culling Park, Dunedin

1 June 2013	Northern	2–1	Otago University	The Gardens, Dunedin

=== Round 3 ===
All fixtures, results and dates are taken from the following sources: The Ultimate New Zealand Soccer Website, RSSSF, Capital Football Season Review and New Zealand Football.

Northern region

15/16 June 2013	Hamilton Wanderers	5–0	Mangere United	Porritt Stadium, Hamilton

15/16 June 2013	Bay Olympic	5–1	East Coast Bays	Olympic Park, Auckland

15/16 June 2013	Manurewa	2–1	Three Kings United	War Memorial Park, Auckland

15/16 June 2013	Melville United	2–1	Papatoetoe	Gower Park, Hamilton

15/16 June 2013	Onehunga-Mangere United	0–2	Ngaruawahia United	Māngere Domain, Māngere

15/16 June 2013	Fencibles United	1–4	Onehunga Sports	Riverhills Domain, Auckland

15/16 June 2013	Ellerslie	1–3	Waitakere City	Michaels Avenue Reserve, Ellerslie

15/16 June 2013	Glenfield Rovers	2–3	Birkenhead United	McFetridge Park, North Shore

Central region

15/16 June 2013	Napier City Rovers	1–2	Wairarapa United	Bluewater Stadium, Napier
Note: Wairarapa United used an ineligible player and were disqualified; Napier allowed to progress

15/16 June 2013	Island Bay United	2–2 (a.e.t.) (4–5 p)	Wellington Olympic	Wakefield Park, Wellington

15/16 June 2013	Tawa	0–3	Palmerston North Marist

15/16 June 2013	Lower Hutt City	1–0	Waterside Karori	Bell Park, Lower Hutt

Southern region

15/16 June 2013	Cashmere Technical	2–0	Ferrymead Bays	Garrick Memorial Park, Christchurch

15/16 June 2013	Roslyn-Wakari	8–1	Northern	Ellis Park, Dunedin

15/16 June 2013	Nelson College	1–2	Waimakariri United

15/16 June 2013	Caversham	4–0	Dunedin Technical	Tonga Park, Dunedin

=== Round 4 ===
All fixtures, results and dates are taken from the following sources: The Ultimate New Zealand Soccer Website, RSSSF, Capital Football Season Review and New Zealand Football.

Northern region

29/30 June 2013	Manurewa	0–1	Melville United	War Memorial Park, Auckland
			Te Pou

29/30 June 2013	Birkenhead United	3–1	Hamilton Wanderers	Shepherds Park, North Shore
	Hobson-McVeigh; Neblett; Windust		Jones

29/30 June 2013	Onehunga Sports	4–0	Ngaruawahia United	Waikaraka Park, Auckland
	Kelly ^{(2)}; Furukawa; Freeman

29/30 June 2013	Waitakere City	3–1	Bay Olympic	Fred Taylor Park, West Auckland
	Krishna ^{(2)}; Shah		Tanabe

Central region

29/30 June 2013	Palmerston North Marist	1–1 (a.e.t.) (4–2 p)	Napier City Rovers	Memorial Park, Palmerston North
	Mosquera		Wilson

29/30 June 2013	Wellington Olympic	4–2	Lower Hutt City	Wakefield Park, Wellington
	Hannah ^{(3)}; Putt		Hailermariam; Coad

Southern region

29/30 June 2013	Cashmere Technical	7–0	Waimakariri United	Garrick Memorial Park, Christchurch
	Ede ^{(2)}; Schwarz ^{(2)}; Barton; Kelly; Terris

=== Quarter-finals ===
All fixtures, results and dates are taken from the following sources: The Ultimate New Zealand Soccer Website, RSSSF, Capital Football Season Review and New Zealand Football.

27/28 July 2013	Melville United	2–1	Birkenhead United	Gower Park, Hamilton
	Hilliar; Scott		Tuiloma

27/28 July 2013	Waitakere City	7–0	Onehunga Sports	Fred Taylor Park, West Auckland
	Krishna ^{(2)}; Turner; Shak; Butler; Muchirahondo; Petos

27/28 July 2013	Wellington Olympic	3–2	Caversham	Wakefield Park, Wellington
	Kenny; O'Connor; Lewis		Hancock; Ryder

27/28 July 2013	Palmerston North Marist	0–1	Cashmere Technical	Memorial Park, Palmerston North
			Pitman

=== Semi-finals ===
All fixtures, results and dates are taken from the following sources: The Ultimate New Zealand Soccer Website, RSSSF, Capital Football Season Review and New Zealand Football.

24 August 2013	Melville United	1–4	Waitakere City	Gower Park, Hamilton
	Hafal		Krishna ^{(2)}; Turner; Fakasega

24 August 2013	Cashmere Technical	4–0	Wellington Olympic	Garrick Memorial Park, Christchurch
	O'Brian ^{(2)}; Mitchell; Ede

=== Final ===
All fixtures, results and dates are taken from the following sources: The Ultimate New Zealand Soccer Website, RSSSF, Capital Football Season Review and New Zealand Football. Team lists and numbers taken from NZ Football on YouTube.

15 September 2013

Cashmere Technical	3–1	Waitakere City
Boys 5' (pen.); Kelly 23'; Ede 90+4'	report	Butler 16'

English Park, Christchurch
Referee: Nick Waldron

Cashmere Technical	Waitakere City

GK	22	Shaun Roberts
DF	3	Daniel Terris
DF		Nick Wortelboer
DF	5	Dan Schwarz
MF	6	Tom Schwarz	(yellow card) 57'
MF	7	Julyan Collett	(yellow card) 35'	(substituted off) 75'
MF	8	Stuart Kelly	(yellow card) 41'	(substituted off) 87'
MF	16	Cory Mitchell
MF	18	Shawn O'Brien		(substituted off) 82'
FW	19	Andy Pitman (c)	(yellow card) 66'
FW	33	Danny Boys
Substitutes:
	4	James Price
	10	Dan Ede		(substituted on) 82'
	11	Jamie Smith		(substituted on) 87'
	12	Andrew Barton		(substituted on) 75'
Manager:
John Brown

GK	1	Eamon Goodin
DF	2	Matthew Chatterton
DF	3	Tim Myers
DF	5	Sam Redwood
MF	7	Imraan Shah	(substituted off) 81'
MF	9	Rory Turner
MF	10	Denver MacDonald
MF	11	Roy Krishna (c)
MF	14	Kodai Hayashi
FW	17	Jake Butler	(substituted off) 68'
FW	18	Jack Caunter
Substitutes:
	4	John Muchirahondo
	12	Kario Pavic
	13	Meneua Fakasega	(substituted on) 81'
	16	Joseph Turagabeci
Manager:
Colin Tuaa

Jack Batty Memorial Cup:

- Andy Pitman
