= 1986 Chatham Cup =

Tournament details
- Venue(s): first leg: Fuji Film Stadium, North Shore second leg: Links Road Ground, Mount Maunganui
- Dates: first leg: 5 October 1986; second leg: 12 October 1986

Final positions
- Champions: North Shore United (6th title)
- Runners-up: Mount Maunganui

Awards
- Jack Batty Memorial Cup: Duncan Cole, North Shore United

The 1986 Chatham Cup was the 59th annual nationwide knockout football competition in New Zealand.

Up to the last 16 of the competition, the cup was run in three regions (northern, central, and southern). In a change to previous years, National League teams received a bye until Round Three (the final 64 stage) of the competition, one round earlier than previously. In all, 143 teams took part in the competition. Note: Different sources give different numberings for the rounds of the competition: some start round one with the beginning of the regional qualifications; others start numbering from the first national knock-out stage. The former numbering scheme is used in this article.

== The 1986 final ==
Unlike previous years, the final was held over two legs, home and away. This format proved unpopular, and was abandoned after three years, with the cup reverting to a single final format in 1989. In the final North Shore United became the first six-times winner of the Chatham Cup.

The first leg was held at North Shore United's Fuji Film Stadium. The game was not a particularly memorable one, although it did have its moments, notably a penalty miss from the home side. This would have evened the tie up, as Mount Maunganui gained a lead halfway through the first half via a Tony Ferris goal. This proved to be the only goal of the match.

The second leg in Mount Maunganui was a more high-scoring and open game. Kevin Hagan opened the scoring for Shore after just five minutes. Mount Maunganui fought back to equalise through Grant Proudman halfway through the first spell, but Shore's Darren McClennan restored their lead before half time and - thanks to the away goals rule - put them on track for the trophy. Away goals were not to be needed, however, as both Kim Wright (after 65 minutes) and Brian McKeown (87 minutes) added to North Shore's tally, taking them to an aggregate 4–2 win.

The Jack Batty Memorial Trophy for player of the final was awarded to Duncan Cole of North Shore United.

== Results ==
=== Third round ===
Canterbury University	2 – 3	Invercargill Thistle

Caversham	4 – 2	Western (Christchurch)

Christchurch Rangers	0 – 1	Queens Park (Invercargill)

Green Island	6 – 3	North End United (Dunedin)

Halswell United	1 – 2	Dunedin City

Havelock North Wanderers	0 – 5	Miramar Rangers

Island Bay United	3 – 1	Mana United (Porirua)

Kawerau Town	3 – 6	Howick

Levin United	5 – 1	Riverside (Palmerston North)

Lower Hutt City	4 – 0	Wainuiomata

Lynndale (Auckland)	0 – 3	Mount Maunganui

Manurewa	8 – 0	Otahuhu United

Massey University	2 – 1	Wellington Olympic

Masterton	2 – 0	Moturoa

Mount Wellington	2 – 1	Ellerslie

Naenae	0 – 3	Napier City Rovers

Nelson United	2 – 1	Wellington United

New Brighton	0 – 4	Christchurch United

New Plymouth Old Boys	2 – 0	Wanganui East Athletic

North Shore United	1 – 0	Metro College

North Wellington	1 – 3	Waterside (Wellington)

Onehunga-Mangere United	3 – 1	Waikato Unicol

Oratia United	2 – 1	AFC Waikato (Hamilton)

Otara Rangers	0 – 7	Papatoetoe

Pakuranga Town	1 – 3	Tauranga City

Petone	4 – 1	Manawatu United (Palmerston North)

Red Sox (Palmerston North)	1 – 9	Gisborne City

South Canterbury United (Timaru)	0 – 3	Shamrock (Christchurch)

Takapuna City	5 – 3	Rotorua Suburbs

Waihopai (Invercargill)	0 – 2	Christchurch Technical

Waitemata City	0 – 5	East Coast Bays

Whangarei City	1 – 1*	University Cowan (Auckland)

* Won on penalties by University Cowan (4–3)

=== Fourth round ===
Christchurch United	4 – 0	Caversham

Dunedin City	2 – 0	Queens Park

Green Island	1 – 3	Christchurch Technical

Howick	1 – 2	North Shore United

Invercargill Thistle	1 – 2	Shamrock

Island Bay United	0 – 8	Miramar Rangers

Manurewa	2 – 0	Mount Wellington

Masterton	0 – 2	Lower Hutt City

Mount Maunganui	4 – 3	Oratia United

Napier City Rovers	0 – 5	Gisborne City

Nelson United	6 – 1	Levin United

Onehunga-Mangere United	0 – 7	Papatoetoe

Petone	1 – 2	New Plymouth Old Boys

Takapuna City	3 – 0	East Coast Bays

Tauranga City	1 – 6	University Cowan

Waterside	0 – 1	Massey University

=== Fifth round ===
Dunedin City	0 – 2	Christchurch United

Gisborne City	1 – 1 (aet)*	Nelson United

Massey University	1 – 5	Lower Hutt City

Miramar Rangers	3 – 0	New Plymouth Old Boys

North Shore United	2 – 0	Manurewa

Shamrock	2 – 2 (aet)*	Christchurch Technical

QEII Stadium
Referee: L Billcliff

Takapuna City	1 – 1 (aet)*	Papatoetoe

University Cowan	2 – 4	Mount Maunganui

* Won on penalties by Nelson United (11–10), Christchurch Technical (4–3), and Papatoetoe (4–3).

=== Sixth Round ===
Christchurch Technical	0 – 3	Christchurch United

Lower Hutt City	1 – 5	North Shore United

Mount Maunganui	1 – 0 (aet)	Miramar Rangers

Nelson United	1 – 0	Papatoetoe

=== Semi-finals ===
Mount Maunganui	1 – 0	Christchurch United

North Shore United	2 – 1 (aet)	Nelson United

=== Final ===
5 October 1986

North Shore United	0 – 1	Mount Maunganui
Ferris

Fuji Film Stadium, North Shore
Referee: D. Fellows
12 October 1986

Mount Maunganui	1 – 4	North Shore United
Proudman		Hagan, McClennan, Wright, McKeown

Links Road Ground, Mount Maunganui
Referee: D. Fellows

North Shore United won 4–2 on aggregate.
