= Capital Premier (New Zealand) =

Capital Premier League
- Founded: 1891
- Country: New Zealand
- Confederation: OFC (Oceania)
- Number of clubs: 10
- Level on pyramid: 4
- Promotion to: Central League 2
- Relegation to: Capital 1
- Domestic cup: Chatham Cup
- Current champions: Wellington Olympic Reserves (4th title) (2025)
- Most championships: Waterside Karori (23 titles) total includes as Waterside and as Wellington Swifts
- Website: Capital Football
- Current: 2026 Capital Premier

The Capital Premier League is an amateur status league competition run by Capital Football for football clubs located in the southern part of the North Island, New Zealand. It is at the fourth level of New Zealand Football behind the national club based New Zealand National League and leads to promotion into the Central League 2, which is the second highest level of club based football available to teams within the region.

== League history ==
The Capital Premier, originally called the Wellington League, was the highest league in the Wellington Region, started in 1891. In 1896, the Venus Shield, named after the "New Venus" tobacco was donated by Cameron & Bros., America, the manufacturers. The league became known as the New Venus Shield league and the trophy was awarded to the winner of the competition each season.

In 1967, the league dropped to being the second level of competition with the formation of the Central League and called the Second Division. The Central League became the feeder league for the National Soccer League in 1970 dropping the Premier League to third level in New Zealand football.

In 2000, the league became the Capital Premier League with the winner then playing off from the top team from Central Football's Central Federation League for a spot in the Central League.

== Capital Premier League Clubs ==
=== Current clubs ===
As of the 2026 season.

Club	Location	Home Ground(s)
Greytown	Greytown	Soldiers Memorial Park
Miramar Rangers (2)	Miramar, Wellington	David Farrington Park
Petone (2)	Petone, Lower Hutt	Memorial Park
Upper Hutt City	Upper Hutt	Maidstone Park
Waterside Karori (2)	Karori, Wellington	Karori Park
Wellington Marist	Kilbirnie, Wellington	Kilbirnie Park
Wellington Olympic (2)	Island Bay, Wellington	Wakefield Park
Wellington Phoenix Reserves (3)	Lower Hutt	Fraser Park
Western Suburbs (2)	Porirua	Endeavour Park

(2) — Denotes club's second team
(3) — Denotes club's third team

== Records ==
=== Past Champions ===
- 1891 – Petone Wanderers
- 1892 – Queen's Park Wellington
- 1893 – Wellington Rovers
- 1894 – Wellington Rovers
- 1895 – Wellington Swifts
- 1896 – Wellington Swifts
- 1897 – Wellington Swifts
- 1898 – Wellington Rovers
- 1899 – Wellington Rovers
- 1900 – Diamond Wellington
- 1901 – Wellington Swifts
- 1902 – Wellington St. John's
- 1903 – Wellington St. John's
- 1904 – Diamond Wellington
- 1905 – Diamond Wellington
- 1906 – Diamond Wellington
- 1907 – Wellington Swifts
- 1908 – Diamond Wellington
- 1909 – Wellington Swifts
- 1910 – Ramblers Wellington
- 1911 – Wellington Swifts
- 1912 – Hospital Porirua
- 1913 – Wellington Thistle
- 1914 – Wellington Corinthians
- 1915 – Wellington Thistle
- 1916–1917 – no competition
- 1918 – Porirua Wellington
- 1919 – YMCA Wellington
- 1920 – Wellington Thistle
- 1921 – Hospital
- 1922 – Waterside
- 1923 – Waterside
- 1924 – YMCA
- 1925 – YMCA
- 1926 – Hospital
- 1927 – YMCA
- 1928 – YMCA
- 1929 – Diamond
- 1930 – Hospital
- 1931 – Petone
- 1932 – Marist
- 1933 – Petone
- 1934 – Marist
- 1935 – Hospital
- 1936 – Hospital
- 1937 – Waterside
- 1938 – Waterside
- 1939 – Petone
- 1940 – Waterside
- 1941 – Seatoun
- 1942 – Hospital
- 1943 – Waterside
- 1944 – Waterside
- 1945 – Marist
- 1946 – Marist
- 1947 – Marist
- 1948 – Waterside
- 1949 – Seatoun
- 1950 – Seatoun
- 1951 – Seatoun
- 1952 – Petone
- 1953 – Marist
- 1954 – Stop Out
- 1955 – Stop Out
- 1956 – Stop Out
- 1957 – Seatoun
- 1958 – Seatoun
- 1959 – Northern
- 1960 – Railways
- 1961 – Northern
- 1962 – Northern
- 1963 – Diamond
- 1964 – Diamond
- 1965 – Diamond
- 1966 – Miramar Rangers
- 1967 – Hungaria
- 1968 – Western Suburbs
- 1969 – Western Suburbs
- 1970 – Waterside
- 1971 – Waterside
- 1972 – Wellington United Diamond
- 1973 – Waterside
- 1974 – Porirua United
- 1975 – Wellington United Diamond
- 1976 – Nelson United
- 1977 – Waterside
- 1978 – Manawatu United
- 1979 – Gisborne City
- 1980 – Miramar Rangers
- 1981 – Napier City Rovers
- 1982 – Nelson United
- 1983 – Stop Out
- 1984 – Stop Out
- 1985 – Manawatu United
- 1986 – Napier City Rovers
- 1987 – Waterside Karori
- 1988 – Waterside Karori
- 1989 – New Plymouth Old Boys
- 1990 – Petone
- 1991 – Wellington Olympic
- 1992 – Tawa
- 1993 – Stokes Valley
- 1994 – Napier City Rovers
- 1995 – Island Bay United
- 1996 – Stop Out
- 1997 – Island Bay United
- 1998 – Upper Hutt City
- 1999 – Napier City Rovers
- 2000 – Western Suburbs
- 2001 – Wellington United
- 2002 – Western Suburbs
- 2003 – Lower Hutt City
- 2004 – Miramar Rangers
- 2005 – Stop Out
- 2006 – Petone
- 2007 – Petone
- 2008 – Miramar Rangers
- 2009 – Tawa
- 2010 – Upper Hutt City
- 2011 – Wellington United
- 2012 – Upper Hutt City
- 2013 – Stop Out
- 2014 – Stop Out
- 2015 – Wellington United
- 2016 – Waterside Karori
- 2017 – Waterside Karori
- 2018 – North Wellington
- 2019 – Petone
- 2020 – Wainuiomata
- 2021 – Lower Hutt City
- 2022 – Stop Out
- 2023 – Wellington Olympic Reserves
- 2024 – Wellington Olympic Reserves
- 2025 – Wellington Olympic Reserves
