= Central Federation League =

- Founded: 2000
- Folded: 2024
- Replaced by: Western Premiership; Eastern Premiership
- Country: New Zealand
- Confederation: OFC (Oceania)
- Number of clubs: 9
- Level on pyramid: 4
- Promotion to: Central League 2
- Relegation to: Taranaki Premiership; Pacific Premiership; Horizon's Premiership
- Domestic cup: Chatham Cup
- League cup(s): Central Federation Cup; Central Federation League Cup
- Last champions: Palmerston North United (1st title) (2024)
- Most championships: Havelock North Wanderers; Napier City Rovers; Palmerston North Marist; Team Taranaki (3 titles each)
- Website: https://www.centralfootball.co.nz/

The Central Federation League was an amateur status league competition run by Central Football for association football clubs located in the central region of the North Island, New Zealand. It was ranked in the third level of the New Zealand football league system, below the Central League administered by Capital Football and was entered by clubs from the Taranaki, Manawatū-Whanganui, Hawke's Bay and Gisborne districts.

In 2025, the league was replaced by two parallel leagues, the Eastern Premiership and the Western Premiership.

== History ==
The league was launched in 2000 and began within the second tier of the New Zealand football league system as a replacement for the disbanded triple-division Central League, which had run in various forms since 1966.

== Final season clubs ==
Location of clubs in New Zealand for the 2024 Central Federation League season

As of the 2024 season.

| Club | Location | Home Ground(s) | 2023 season |
|---|---|---|---|
| FC Western | New Plymouth | Lynmouth Park | 2nd in Taranaki Premiership (new entry) |
| Gisborne Thistle | Gisborne | Childers Road Reserve | 4th |
| Havelock North Wanderers | Havelock North | Guthrie Park | 2nd in Pacific Premiership (new entry) |
| New Plymouth Rangers | New Plymouth | Merrilands Domain | 3rd in Taranaki Premiership (new entry) |
| Palmerston North Marist | Palmerston North | Central Energy Trust Arena Turf | 1st |
| Palmerston North United | Palmerston North | Memorial Park | 2nd |
| Peringa United | New Plymouth | Peringa Park | 1st in Taranaki Premiership (new entry) |
| Taradale | Napier | Taradale Park | 5th |
| Whanganui Athletic | Wembley Park | Whanganui | 10th in Central League (relegated) |

== Records ==
=== Past Champions ===
- 2000 – Manawatu
- 2001 – Napier City Rovers
- 2002 – Napier City Rovers
- 2003 – Manawatu
- 2004 – Napier City Rovers
- 2005 – Gisborne Thistle
- 2006 – Team Taranaki
- 2007–09 – not contested
- 2010 – Maycenvale United
- 2011–12 – not contested
- 2013 – Palmerston North Marist
- 2014 – Wanganui Athletic
- 2015 – Team Taranaki
- 2016 – Team Taranaki
- 2017 – Havelock North Wanderers
- 2018 – Palmerston North Marist
- 2019 – Havelock North Wanderers
- 2020 – New Plymouth Rangers
- 2021 – Havelock North Wanderers
- 2022 – Whanganui Athletic
- 2023 – Palmerston North Marist
- 2024 - Palmerston North United

=== 2024 Federation League Table ===
| Club | Pld | W | D | L | GF | GA | GD | Pts |
|---|---|---|---|---|---|---|---|---|
| Palmerston North United | 16 | 11 | 3 | 2 | | | 40 | 36 |
| Palmerston North Marist | 16 | 11 | 0 | 5 | | | 29 | 33 |
| FC Western | 16 | 10 | 1 | 5 | | | 3 | 31 |
| Taradale | 16 | 9 | 1 | 6 | | | 4 | 28 |
| Havelock North Wanderers | 16 | 8 | 1 | 7 | | | 1 | 25 |
| Gisborne Thistle | 16 | 7 | 1 | 8 | | | -20 | 22 |
| New Plymouth Rangers | 16 | 6 | 1 | 9 | | | -6 | 19 |
| Whanganui Athletic | 16 | 3 | 1 | 12 | | | -18 | 10 |
| Peringa United | 16 | 2 | 1 | 13 | | | -33 | 7 |

The 2024 season saw the league increase the number of clubs from five to nine. Whanganui Athletic, relegated from the 2023 Central League, joined a trio of clubs from New Plymouth including; 2023 Taranaki Premiership champions Peringa United, FC Western (both new entrants to the league), and the returning New Plymouth Rangers. Havelock North Wanderers rejoined the league from the Pacific Premiership while Napier City Rovers reserves withdrew before the 2024 season commenced.

=== 2024 Central League Premier Division place play-off ===
Central League Premier play-off
7 September 2024
14:30 NZST
First leg

| Palmerston North United | 1–2 | Upper Hutt City FC |
|---|---|---|
| A. Jones 66' | | C. Webster 14', 46' |

Memorial Park, Palmerston North
Referee: M. Roil
Central League Premier play-off
14 September 2024
14:30 NZST
Second leg

| Upper Hutt City FC | 2–1 | Palmerston North United |
|---|---|---|
| C. Webster 39', 90' (pen.) | | N. Cooksley 69' |

Maidstone Park, Wellington
Referee: C. Bennett

Upper Hutt City win 4 - 2 on aggregate and promotion to the 2025 Central League Premier Division.

=== 2024 Central League 2 play-offs ===
Central League 2 play-off
14 September 2024
14:00 NZST

| Taradale | 4 - 1 | Victoria University |

Massey University, Palmerston North
Central League 2 play-off
14 September 2024
14:00 NZST

| Te Kotahitanga | 1 - 0 | Gisborne Thistle |

Massey University, Palmerston North
Central League 2 play-off
14 September 2024
14:00 NZST

| Havelock North Wanderers | 3 - 4 (a.e.t.) | Douglas Villa |

Massey University, Palmerston North
Central League 2 play-off
14 September 2024
14:00 NZST

| Seatoun | 2 - 1 | New Plymouth Rangers |

Massey University, Palmerston North

=== 2023 Federation League Table ===
| Club | Pld | W | D | L | GF | GA | GD | Pts |
|---|---|---|---|---|---|---|---|---|
| Palmerston North Marist | 16 | 10 | 1 | 5 | | | | |
| Palmerston North United | 16 | 9 | 0 | 7 | | | | |
| Napier City Rovers Reserves | 16 | 6 | 3 | 7 | | | | |
| Gisborne Thistle | 16 | 5 | 3 | 8 | | | | |
| Taradale | 16 | 4 | 5 | 7 | | | | |

Prior to the commencement of the 2023 season, a merger of three Palmerston North clubs; Massey University FC, North End and Red Sox Manawatu created new entity, Palmerston North United. Palmerston North United replaced North End and Massey University in the league.

Napier Marist FC and Levin AFC withdrew from the league before the 2023 competition began reducing the number of clubs participating to five.

=== 2023 Central League place play-off ===
Central League play-off
16 September 2023
17:30 NZST
First leg

| Island Bay United | 4–0 | Palmerston North Marist |

Wakefield Park, Wellington
Central League play-off
23 September 2023
17:30 NZST
Second leg

| Palmerston North Marist | 0–3 | Island Bay United |

Arena Manawatu, Palmerston North

Island Bay United win 7 - 0 on aggregate and promotion to the 2024 Central League.

=== 2022 Federation League Table ===
| Club | Pld | W | D | L | GF | GA | GD | Pts |
|---|---|---|---|---|---|---|---|---|
| Whanganui Athletic | 14 | 12 | 2 | 0 | 48 | 7 | +41 | 38 |
| Palmerston North Marist | 14 | 10 | 2 | 2 | 39 | 12 | +27 | 32 |
| North End | 14 | 9 | 2 | 3 | 37 | 14 | +23 | 29 |
| Massey University | 14 | 7 | 1 | 6 | 27 | 30 | -3 | 22 |
| Napier Marist | 14 | 6 | 1 | 7 | 25 | 41 | -16 | 19 |
| Napier City Rovers | 14 | 5 | 0 | 9 | 27 | 36 | -9 | 15 |
| Levin | 14 | 1 | 1 | 12 | 12 | 43 | -31 | 4 |
| Gisborne Thistle | 14 | 1 | 1 | 12 | 12 | 44 | -32 | 4 |

=== 2022 Central League place play-off ===
Central League play-off
17 September 2022
14:45 NZST
First leg

| Whanganui Athletic | 2–2 | Stop Out |
|---|---|---|
| Holden 58' (pen.); Smith 82' | | Patterson-Gunn 19'; Prins 78' |

Wembley Park, Whanganui
Referee: Matthew Hastings
Central League play-off
24 September 2022
14:00 NZST
Second leg

| Stop Out | 3–2 (a.e.t.) | Whanganui Athletic |
|---|---|---|
| Tuck 85', 104'; Craven 90+7' | Report | Bell 64'; Holden 90+6' |

Hutt Park, Lower Hutt
Referee: Aaron Clarke

Aggregate score 5–4. Stop Out promoted to the 2022 Central League. In late 2022 Whanganui Athletic were also promoted to the 2023 Central League after the withdrawal of Wellington United from the competition.

=== 2021 Federation League Table ===
| Club | Pld | W | D | L | GF | GA | GD | Pts |
|---|---|---|---|---|---|---|---|---|
| Havelock North Wanderers | 16 | 13 | 2 | 1 | 55 | 16 | +39 | 40 |
| Palmerston North Marist | 16 | 11 | 1 | 4 | 62 | 26 | +36 | 34 |
| Whanganui Athletic | 16 | 9 | 3 | 4 | 38 | 23 | +15 | 30 |
| Gisborne Thistle | 16 | 10 | 0 | 6 | 43 | 32 | 11 | 30 |
| Massey University | 16 | 8 | 4 | 4 | 40 | 31 | 9 | 28 |
| North End | 16 | 7 | 1 | 8 | 35 | 36 | -1 | 22 |
| Napier Marist | 16 | 3 | 1 | 12 | 25 | 57 | -32 | 10 |
| Levin | 16 | 2 | 2 | 12 | 15 | 45 | -30 | 8 |
| New Plymouth Rangers | 16 | 2 | 1 | 13 | 15 | 62 | -47 | 7 |

=== 2021 Central League place play-off ===
Central League play-off
2 October 2022
14:00
First leg

| Wellington United | 5–3 | Havelock North Wanderers |
|---|---|---|
| I. Junca 10'; A. Mandalawi 33'; C. Stephen 37'; W. Skinner 59'; J. Kang 75' | | T. Frooms 29'; L. Barclay 46'; J. Groot 90' |

Newtown Park, Wellington
Referee: Chris Bennett
Central League play-off
9 October 2022
14:00
Second leg

| Havelock North Wanderers | 3–1 | Wellington United |
|---|---|---|
| B. Christensen 8', 68', 90' | | I. Junca 49' |

Guthrie Park, Havelock North
Referee: Matthew Conger

Aggregate score 6–6. Havelock North Wanderers win tie on away goal rule and are promoted to the 2022 Central League.

Note - Wairarapa United withdrew from the 2022 Central League prior to the start of the season and were subsequently replaced by Wellington United.

=== 2020 Central League place play-off ===
Central League play-off
11 October 2020
13:00
First leg

| New Plymouth Rangers | 3 - 5 | Wainuiomata |
|---|---|---|
| D. Squatriti 27'; M.McGrath 75'; A. Olivier (o.g.) | Report | T. E. Hser 15'; K. Gould 22'; J. Mitchell 50'; G. King 54', 68' |

Merrilands Domain, New Plymouth
Referee: Mark Rule
Central League play-off
17 October 2020
14:30
Second leg

| Wainuiomata | 7–3 | New Plymouth Rangers |
|---|---|---|
| A. Olivier 4'; K. Gould 8', 11', 14'; J. Smith 26'; T. E. Hser 32'; C. O'Reilly 87' | Report | L. Snellgrove 57'; T. Warren 75'; D. Squatriti 82' |

Richard Prouse Park, Wainuiomata
Referee: Mark Whitehead

Aggregate score 12 - 6. Wainuiomata are promoted to the 2021 Central League.

=== 2019 Central League place play-off ===
Central League play-off
8 September 2019
First leg

| Havelock North Wanderers | 4–2 | Petone |

Guthrie Park, Havelock North
Central League play-off
14 September 2019
15:00
Second leg

| Petone | 4–1 | Havelock North Wanderers |

Petone Memorial Park, Petone

Petone won 6 - 5 on aggregate and promotion to the 2020 Central League.

=== 2018 Central League place play-off ===
Central League play-off
18 September 2018
First leg

| North Wellington | 6–0 | Palmerston North Marist |

Alex Moore Park, Wellington
Central League play-off
25 September 2018
Second leg

| Palmerston North Marist | 0–6 | North Wellington |

Arena Manawatu, Palmerston North

North Wellington won 12 - 0 on aggregate and promotion to the 2019 Central League.

=== 2017 Central League place play-off ===
Central League play-off
2017
First leg

| Havelock North Wanderers | 1–2 | Waterside Karori |

Guthrie Park, Havelock North
Central League play-off
2017
Second leg

| Waterside Karori | 0–1 | Havelock North Wanderers |

Waterside Karori won promotion on away goal rule to 2018 Central League.

=== 2016 Central League place play-off ===
Central League play-off
2016
First leg

| Team Taranaki | 0 - 1 | Waterside Karori |

Yarrow Stadium, New Plymouth
Central League play-off
2016
Second leg

| Waterside Karori | 1 - 2 | Team Taranaki |

Karori Park, Wellington

Team Taranaki won on away goals rule and promotion to the 2017 Central League.

=== Past Clubs ===
| Club | Location | Home Ground(s) | Last season |
|---|---|---|---|
| Gisborne City | Gisborne | Childers Road Reserve | 2003 - merged as Gisborne City Marist |
| Moturoa AFC | New Plymouth | Onuku Taipari Domain | 2003 - league position given to Team Taranaki |
| Gisborne City Marist | Gisborne | Childers Road Reserve | 2004 - withdrew |
| Manawatu AFC | Palmerston North | | 2004 (amalgamated) |
| Red Sox Riverside | Palmerston North | | 2004 (amalgamated) |
| Linton Area Defence FC | Palmerston North | Linton Military Camp | 2005 - withdrew |
| Napier City Rovers | Napier | Bluewater Stadium | 2010 - withdrew to Pacific Premiership |
| Feilding United | Manawatu | Timona Park | 2015 - withdrew |
| Team Taranaki | New Plymouth | Yarrow Stadium | 2016 - promoted to 2017 Central League |
| Port Hill United | Napier | Marewa Park | 2016 - withdrew |
| Wanganui City FC | Whanganui | Wembley Park | 2019 - withdrew |
| Palmerston North Boys' High School | Palmerston North | High School Ground | 2019 - relegated |
| Hokowhitu FC | Palmerston North | Hokowhitu Park | 2019 - withdrew |
| Red Sox Manawatu | Palmerston North | | 2020 - withdrew |
| Levin | Levin | Donnelly Park | 2022 - withdrew to Horizons Premiership |
| Napier Marist | Napier | Bluewater Stadium | 2022 - withdrew to Pacific Premiership |
| North End | Palmerston North | Memorial Park | 2022 - merged as Palmerston North United |
| Massey University | Palmerston North | Massey University | 2022 - merged as Palmerston North United |
| Napier City Rovers Reserves | Napier | Bluewater Stadium | 2023 - withdrew to Pacific Premiership |

== Central Federation Cup ==
The Lotto Central Federation Cup is the premier men's knock-out trophy of the Central Football Federation and is contested annually by clubs affiliated to the Central Football Federation. The cup competition in its current form began in 2009, with the exception of the COVID-19 affected 2020 season when the first round of matches was initially scheduled then subsequently cancelled.

=== Central Federation Cup Champions ===
- 2009 - Wanganui City AFC
- 2010 - Gisborne City AFC
- 2011 - Maycenvale United²
- 2012 - Napier City Rovers FC²
- 2013 - Havelock North Wanderers AFC
- 2014 - Gisborne United AFC
- 2015 - Hāwera FC
- 2016 - Napier City Rovers FC²
- 2017 - Massey University Football Club
- 2018 - Eltham AFC
- 2019 - Massey University Football Club
- 2020 - Not contested
- 2021 - Massey University Football Club
- 2022 - Gisborne United AFC
- 2023 - Whanganui Athletic²
- 2024 - Taradale AFC
- 2025 - Napier City Rovers FC²
- 2026 - Gisborne United AFC

*(2) denotes club's second team
