= 1989 Chatham Cup =

Tournament details
- Venue(s): Newtown Park, Wellington
- Dates: 17 September 1989

Final positions
- Champions: Christchurch United (5th title)
- Runners-up: Rotorua City

Awards
- Jack Batty Memorial Cup: Mike McGarry (Christchurch United)

The 1989 Chatham Cup was the 62nd annual nationwide knockout football competition in New Zealand.

Up to the last 16 of the competition, the cup was run in three regions (northern, central, and southern). National League teams received a bye until the final 64 stage. In all, 153 teams took part in the competition, outstripping the previous year's record of 147.

== The 1989 final ==
From this year, the final reverted to a single game, rather than a two-legged tie as had been the case for the previous three years' competitions. The final was very one-sided, with Christchurch United equalling the record of seven goals set by Seatoun in 1958. The aggregate of eight goals in the final also equalled the competition record. Mike McGarry became the tenth player to score a Chatham Cup final hat-trick, the first since Graham Dacombe's four goals - also for Christchurch United - in 1972. Christchurch United's Johan Verweij became the first player to score in three successive Chatham Cup finals. Steve Sumner also entered the record books by being the first player to pick up a sixth cup-winner's medal.

The match went according to the form-book. Despite their fairy-tale run to the final, northern league side Rotorua City were no match for the previous year's national league champions. City keeper Dave Harris had a busy day, and despite making several good saves it was 5–0 by the half-time break, with goals from Keith Braithwaite, McGarry (twice), Verweij, and Laurence Fitzpatrick. In the second spell Steve Sumner added his name to the scorebook before McGarry completed his hat-trick. A Shane Zohs penalty in the 80th minute was a mere consolation for a Rotorua side well beaten.

The Jack Batty Memorial Trophy for player of the final was awarded to Mike McGarry of Christchurch United.

== Results ==
=== Third round ===
Blockhouse Bay	2 – 4	East Coast Bays

Burndale United (Christchurch)	2 – 0	Canterbury University

Christchurch United	10 – 1	Grants Braes (Dunedin)

Dunedin City	6 – 0	Cashmere Wanderers

Eden (Auckland)	0 – 4	Mount Wellington

Gisborne City	4 – 1	Manawatu United (Palmerston N.)

Havelock North Wanderers	11 – 1	Palmerston North End

Howick	4 – 1	Birkenhead United

Huntly Thistle	2 – 1	Waikato Unicol

Levin United	3 – 2	Raumati Hearts

Manurewa	1 – 3	Mount Roskill

Massey	12 – 1	Whakatane Town

Massey University	6 – 5	Gisborne Thistle

Miramar Rangers	2 – 1	Napier City Rovers

Mount Albert-Ponsonby	1 – 0	Waikato United

Mount Maunganui	4 – 0	North Shore United

Naenae	1 – 7	Waterside Karori (Wellington)

New Plymouth Old Boys	2 – 0	Tawa

North End United (Dunedin)	3 – 1	Green Island

Oratia United	3 – 0	Ellerslie

Papatoetoe	2 – 1	West Auckland

Petone	2 – 4	Wellington Olympic

Porirua Viard United	1 – 1 (aet)*	Nelson United

Rangiora	1 – 0	Gore Wanderers

South Auckland Rangers	1 – 4	Rotorua City

Waihopai (Invercargill)	2 – 2 (aet)*	Roslyn-Wakari

Waitakere City	1 – 0	Manukau City

Wanganui East Athletic	0 – 1	Hutt Valley United

Wellington United	7 – 0	Island Bay United

Western (Christchurch)	3 – 1	South Canterbury United (Timaru)

Western Rangers (Hastings)	2 – 6	Stop Out (Lower Hutt)

Woolston WMC	2 – 0	Shamrock (Christchurch)

* Won on penalties by Porirua (5–3) and Roslyn-Wakari (5–4)

=== Fourth round ===
Burndale United	1 – 0	Rangiora

Christchurch United	6 – 0	Roslyn-Wakari

Dunedin City	4 – 0	North End United

East Coast Bays	2 – 3	Oratia United

Howick	3 – 2	Papatoetoe

Huntly Thistle	0 – 6	Waitakere City

Massey	2 – 3	Rotorua City

Massey University	0 – 2	Porirua Viard United

Miramar Rangers	8 – 0	Levin United

Mount Roskill	2 – 3	Mount Maunganui

Mount Wellington	1 – 0	Mount Albert-Ponsonby

New Plymouth Old Boys	2 – 1	Havelock North Wanderers

Stop Out	1 – 2	Wellington Olympic

Waterside Karori	2 – 1	Hutt Valley United

Wellington United	2 – 1	Gisborne City

Woolston WMC	4 – 4 (aet)*	Western

* Won on penalties by Woolston (4–1)

=== Fifth round ===
Dunedin City	0 – 3	Christchurch United

Mount Maunganui	3 – 2	Howick

Mount Wellington	1 – 2	Waitakere City

New Plymouth Old Boys	2 – 1	Wellington Olympic

Oratia United	1 – 2	Rotorua City

Porirua Viard United	2 – 0	Miramar Rangers

Wellington United	0 – 1	Waterside Karori

Woolston W.M.C.	0 – 2	Burndale United

=== Sixth Round ===
Christchurch United	2 – 0	Waterside Karori

Mount Maunganui	6 – 0	Porirua Viard United

New Plymouth Old Boys	3 – 4	Rotorua City

Waitakere City	5 – 0	Burndale United

=== Semi-finals ===
Christchurch United	2 – 1	Waitakere City

Rotorua City	2 – 0	Mount Maunganui

=== Final ===
17 September 1989

Christchurch United	7 – 1	Rotorua City
McGarry 3, Braithwaite, Verweij, Fitzpatrick, Sumner		Zohs (pen.)

Newtown Park, Wellington
Referee: G. Cowie
