= Western Premiership (football) =

- Founded: 2025; 1 year ago
- Country: New Zealand
- Confederation: OFC (Oceania)
- Number of clubs: 11
- Level on pyramid: 4
- Promotion to: Central League 2
- Relegation to: Taranaki Championship; Manawatū Championship
- Domestic cup: Chatham Cup
- League cup: Central Federation Cup
- Current champions: Whanganui Athletic (1st title) (2025)
- Most championships: Whanganui Athletic (1 title)
- Sponsor: Yorb
- Website: www.centralfootball.co.nz/
- Current: https://www.centralfootball.co.nz/whanganui-fixtures/mens-senior-football-3

The Western Premiership is an amateur status league run by Central Football, for association football clubs located in the central mid-west regions of the North Island of New Zealand, and composed of clubs from the Manawatū–Whanganui and Taranaki regions as a New Zealand tier four competition, that pairs with the Eastern Premiership and sits below Central League 2.

The Western Premiership (Western League), has existed sporadically in different forms between 1957 and 2016, and was reformed in 2025 after the collapse of the Central Federation League, replacing both the Horizons Premiership (2017) and the Taranaki Premiership (1986) within the reconfiguration of the leagues by New Zealand Football and Central Football.

== League format ==
The league currently comprises 10 teams, who each play a double round, home and away.

At the conclusion of the Western Premiership competition the winners are crowned champions.

The champions of the Western Premiership then play a two-legged tie with the Eastern Premiership champion.

The winning club of the Western and Eastern Premierships play–off then plays a two-legged tie against the Capital Premier League champions to decide which club is promoted to the next season's Central League 2.

The last placed club of the Western Premiership can be relegated to either the Manawatū or Taranaki Championships and replaced in the competition by the qualifying side from either of the respective regional championships.

== Current clubs ==
As of the 2026 season.

Team	Home ground	Location	2025 season
Feilding United	Timona Park	Feilding, Manawatū-Whanganui	10th
Levin	Donnelly Park	Levin, Horowhenua District	2nd
Moturoa	Onuku Taipari Domain	Spotswood, New Plymouth	6th
New Plymouth Boys' High School 1st XI	Gully Turf	New Plymouth City	4th
New Plymouth Rangers	Merrilands Domain	Merrilands, New Plymouth	7th
Palmerston North Marist ²	Arena Manawatu	Palmerston North	9th
Palmerston North United ²	Memorial Park	Palmerston North	5th
Takaro	Skoglund Park	Takaro, Palmerston North	8th
Western ²	Lynmouth Park	Lynmouth, New Plymouth	3rd
Whanganui Athletic	Wembley Park	Whanganui	1st

² denotes club's reserve team.

^ Wanganui City, after finishing 11th in 2025, were relegated to the 2026 Manawatū Championship.

Location of Football Clubs in New Zealand for the 2025 Western Premiership Season

== Records ==
=== Top scorers ===
The following list is from the 2025 Western Premiership season onwards. New Zealand Football and Central Football reinstated the Western Premiership after disbanding the Central Federation League at the end of the 2024 season.

Season	Top scorer(s)	Club(s)	2025	2026	Total Goals
2025 2026	(New Zealand) Olly James	Levin			31
2025 2026	(England) Ryan Holden	Whanganui Athletic			26
2025 2026	(New Zealand) Tyler Webber	Moturoa			20
2025 2026	Riley Daken	New Plymouth Boys' High School			19
2025 2026	Bruno Bisaga	New Plymouth Boys' High School			19
2026	Jayden Dawson	Levin			15
2026	Adjen Neprelac	Whanganui Athletic			13
2025 2026	(New Zealand) Ethan Webber	Moturoa			13
2025	(New Zealand) Charlie Meredith	Wanganui City			12

The following records are from the 2025 season onwards after the re–formation of Western Premiership.

- Most wins in a season: 16 – Whanganui Athletic (2026)
- Fewest defeats in a season: 1 – Whanganui Athletic (2025 & 2026)
- Most goals scored in a season: 64 – Whanganui Athletic (2026)
- Fewest goals conceded in a season: 9 – Levin (2025)
- Most points in a season: 49 – Whanganui Athletic, from 18 matches (2026)
- Fewest points in a season: 5 - Wanganui City, from 14 matches (2025)
- Highest goal difference: +54 (+64 -10) – Whanganui Athletic (2026)
- Biggest home win: 8 goals – Palmerston North United reserves v FC Western reserves: 9 – 1, Top 6, 2 August (2025)
- Biggest away win: 9 goals – Feilding United v Moturoa: 1 – 10, Round One, 17 May (2025)
- Highest scoring match: 11 goals - Feilding United v Moturoa: 1 – 10, Round One, 17 May (2025)
- Highest scoring draw: 8 goals – Palmerston North United reserves v Moturoa: 4 – 4, Top 6, 19 July (2025) ● Takaro v Wanganui City: 4 – 4, Bottom 5, 9 August (2025)
- Biggest title-winning margin: 10 points – 2026 — Whanganui Athletic (49 points) over Levin (39 points)
- Smallest title-winning margin: – 3 points – 2025 ‐ Whanganui Athletic (40 points) over Levin (37 points)
- Most goals in a single match: 4 goals – Victor Nwanko (Whanganui Athletic) v Feilding United (Away), 7 June 2025 & Ryan Holden (Whanganui Athletic) v Moturoa (Away), 12 July 2025.

=== Playoffs ===
The Western Premiership acts as a qualifier league to the Central League 2 by way of a four match, two legged, home and away play–off series, first with the Eastern Premiership qualifier, with the winner facing the Capital Premier qualifying club.

2025 Western v Eastern Premiership play–off

Havelock North Wanderers qualified from the 10 team Eastern Premiership having won 15 and lost 3 from 18 matches.

The 2025 Eastern Premiership top three also included Napier City Rovers reserves and Gisborne United.

2025 Eastern v Western Premiership play-off
6 August 2025
14:00 NZST
First leg

Havelock North Wanderers	0–3	Whanganui Athletic
		J. Joblin Hall 10'; C. Peterson 14'; V. Nwanko 29'

Guthrie Park, Havelock North
2025 Eastern v Western Premiership play-off
23 August 2025
14:00 NZST
Second leg

Whanganui Athletic	2–1	Havelock North Wanderers
I. El maakoul 27'; R. Holden 58'		A. Absolom 61'; K. Willox 🟥 90 + 5'

Wembley Park, Whanganui

Whanganui Athletic won 5–1 on aggregate to proceed to the Central versus Capital Federation play–off against Capital qualifier Wainuiomata AFC.

2025 Central League 2 (2026) Promotion play-off

2026 Central League 2 play-off
6 September 2025
14:45 NZST
First leg

Whanganui Athletic	3–1	Wainuiomata
R. Noon 53'; Z. Farmer 83'; C. Skea 90+1'; J. Joblin–Hall 🟥 90+5'	Report	F. McCaul 6'

Wembley Park, Whanganui
2026 Central League 2 play-off
13 September 2025
14:45 NZST
Second leg

Wainuiomata	4–1	Whanganui Athletic
B. Taylor 47'; C. Skea (o.g.); A. Ross (pen.), 60'; J. Brown 79'	Report	R. Noon 90+1'

Richard Prouse Park, Wainuiomata, Lower Hutt

Wainuiomata won 5 – 4 on aggregate and gained promotion to the 2026 Central League 2.

Whanganui Athletic returned to the 2026 Western Premiership.
