= Moturoa AFC =

Association football club in New Zealand

Moturoa Association Football Club
- Full name: Moturoa Association Football and Sports Club Inc.
- Nickname: The Reds
- Short name: M.A.F.C.
- Founded: 1928; 98 years ago
- Ground: Onuku Taipari Domain, New Plymouth
- Capacity: Open ground
- Coordinates: 39°04′12″S 174°01′32.88″E
- Chairman: Scotty Manson
- League: Western Premiership
- 2026: Western Premiership, 9th of 10
- Website: www.moturoaafc.co.nz
Home colours	Away colours	Third colours

Moturoa AFC is one of New Zealand's oldest association football clubs. The club competes in the Western Premiership.

Based in New Plymouth, the club was established as the New Plymouth Watersiders Association Football Club.

Moturoa AFC has rich history, with the club having had success in many regional and national competitions.

The clubrooms and home grounds of Moturoa AFC are at the Onuku Taipari Domain, Ngāmotu Road, Spotswood, New Plymouth.

Onuku Taipari Domain | Boxing Day | 1984

== Early history ==
Originally the Moturoa Football Club was a short-lived rugby club, started by the Breakwater Sports Committee in the kiosk at Ngāmotu Beach in early 1914, before amalgamating with the Star club.

Moturoa FC's home ground was the "prison reserve field" adjacent to Ōtaka Street in Moturoa.The original club retained one junior team for a short period after the amalgamation that played in the club's colour – white, with the addition of the Star FC emblem on the shirt chest.

From 1915 to 1921 there was no official Taranaki Association Football Championship due to the war.

The New Plymouth club relied on friendly games against mariners of the trade shipping at the Port of Moturoa.

The first ever recorded Moturoa association football team was published in the Taranaki Daily News on 25 May 1925. Players; Thompson, Matthews, Randell, the Spedding brothers, the Anderson brothers, Murray, Mells, Peere, Towes and Cole were scheduled to face Fitzroy at the Tukapa Ground in Westown.

There was an annual meeting of the New Plymouth Association Football Club in mid-May 1926 where it was decided that the Moturoa and New Plymouth Clubs' combine for the purpose of entering a team for the Julian Cup.

New Plymouth/Moturoa ○ 1926 Chinese Cup winners

At a meeting of the Northern sub-division of the football association executive on 4 July 1927, the recently donated trophy by Duff & Co. to the Watersiders club was discussed. As the four teams entered were not affiliated to the NZFA an approach was made to the Taranaki Football Association asking permission to run the competition.

In the final match of the inaugural Duff Rose Bowl at Western Park in 1927 the Watersiders beat the Fitzroy-based Rangers club with Ted Spedding scoring twice. The winning team also included; goalkeeper Tom Broughton, H. Lewis, W. Davis, I. Thompson, R. Murray, R. Hughes, Anderson, Young, Wylie, J. Spedding, and reserves Karim, White and McCullough.

The Watersiders Association Football Club committee met in March 1928 where a decision was made to change its name to the Moturoa Club. At the meeting the report detailing the 1927 season was presented. The Duff Rose Bowl was given to the Northern sub-division of the Taranaki Football Association for competition amongst local teams. The annual subscription was set at five shillings, colours of red shirts with white pants fixed and a squad of twenty players registered.

Moturoa first affiliated with the Taranaki Football Association for the 1928 season. Moturoa won the 1929 Chinese Cup. Moturoa's intermediate team, competing for the 1929 Plunket Cup, lost the final to Caledonian. Moturoa also won the 1929 Plumb Cup for the Taranaki junior championship.

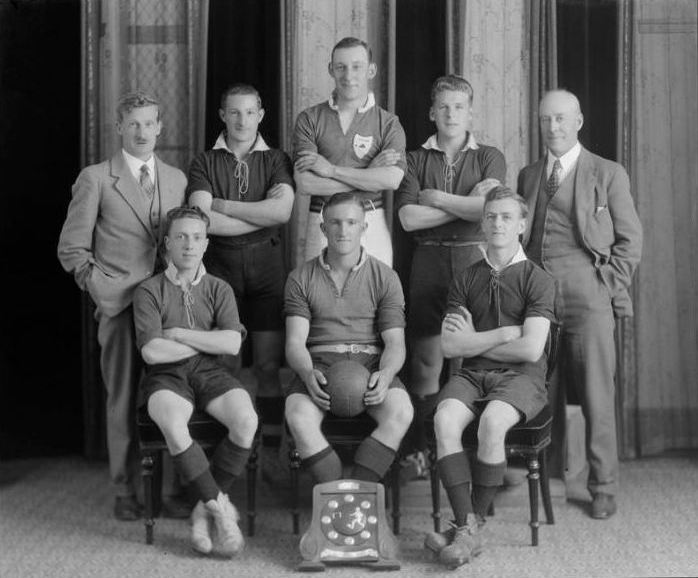
Moturoa 1931 Priest Shield 6-a-side winners

Moturoa won the annual six-a-side competition for the Priest Shield at New Plymouth in 1931. There were six teams in the competition which was conducted at Western Park. The players in the final for Moturoa were: goal-keeper – Roy Johns, Ronald and Frank Roper, J. Anderson, C. White, A. Smith. The final score was Moturoa – 3 Stratford – 1. White scoring a hat-trick for Moturoa.

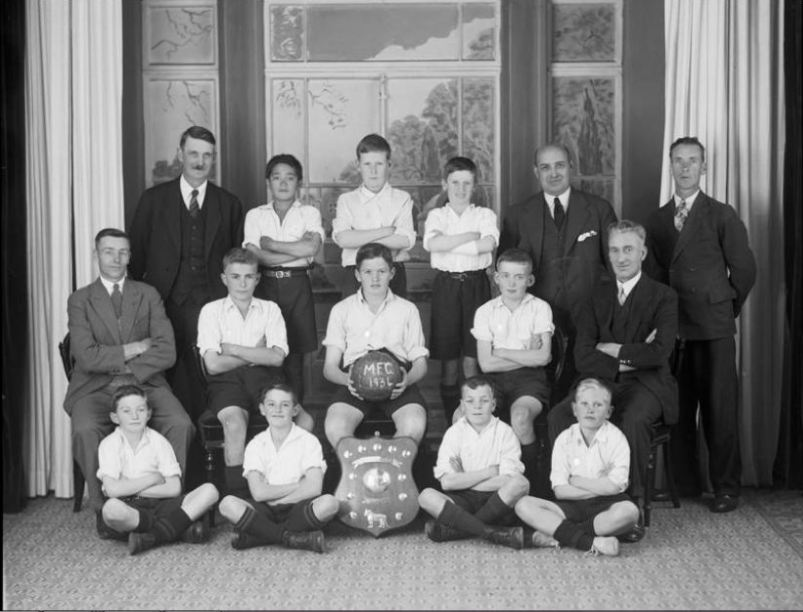
Moturoa Football Club – 1934 Malayan Shield Winners

The Moturoa School team won the Malayan Shield in 1934 with Mr. Peter Gardner and Mr. Edward Kenny as coaches, and Master. Dan Kendall as captain.

== Chatham Cup ==
Moturoa have competed for the Chatham Cup since 1949, reaching the North Island semi-final in 1954 against Stop Out at Western Park, and again in 1959 against Miramar Rangers at the Basin Reserve.

In 1960 Moturoa reached the North Island Final of the Chatham Cup, facing North Shore United at Auckland's Blandford Park,

In 1962 Moturoa again reached the North Island Final of the Chatham Cup, facing Hamilton Technical Old Boys at Seddon Park.

In 1966 Moturoa reached the North Island Semi-final of the Chatham Cup, facing Miramar Rangers once again, but on this occasion at Western Park, New Plymouth.

Moturoa reached the fifth round of the Chatham Cup in the 1969, 1971 and 1972 seasons, with the 1972 competition notable for knocking out the holders of the trophy Western Suburbs in the fourth round, 1 – 0. Moturoa's Australian signing of the 1972 season – striker Archie Smith, scored the decisive goal.

Moturoa AFC has since reached the fourth round of the Chatham Cup in 1974, 1987, 2000 and 2002 and last competed in the competition in 2023.

== Moturoa Women's Football ==
The original Moturoa women's team formed in 1969.

In 1975 the Taranaki Women's Football Association was formed and Moturoa began playing league football.

Moturoa won the Taranaki Women's Football Association B division in 1981 and 1992.

In 2010 Moturoa won the Taranaki Women's Premiership for the first time.

In 2011 Moturoa won the Central Women's Federation Cup for the first time.

In 2013 Moturoa won the Taranaki title, the Duchess Cup and a second Federation Cup.

In 2015 Moturoa entered the women's Central League competition administered by Capital Football and finished fifth in the first season.

The 2018 season saw Moturoa finish as runner-up to Massey University after joining the Central Women's Federation League in 2017.

In 2020 Moturoa won the Central Federation Women's Premier League.

In 2022 the Moturoa women's side won the Central Women's Federation Cup for the fourth time along with a treble of local Taranaki titles.

In 2023 Moturoa won the Women's Central Federation League for a second time, the Central Federation Cup for a fourth time, and subsequent promotion to the 2024 Women's Central League, after a play-off with Horowhenua Coastal (Te Kotahitanga FC).

The Moturoa Women's reserve side won its ninth Taranaki Women's Championship in 2023, along with the league challenge trophy, and the Taranaki regional Women's knock-out competition, the Duchess Cup .

In early 2026, the Moturoa Women's Central League team withdrew from the competition, returning to the reinstated 2026 Central Women's Federation League.

New Zealand Regional National Women's League Zones

=== Kate Sheppard Cup ===
Moturoa entered the New Zealand Football Women's National knock-out cup (Kate Sheppard Cup) for the first time in 2023.

== Honours ==
=== Men's ===
==== 1928 – 1978 ====
- Taranaki Championship (Julian Cup): 1956, 1959, 1960, 1961, 1962, 1963, 1964 (shared with New Plymouth Old Boys), 1965, 1968 (& MBTC Knock-out Cup), 1969, 1971.
- 1926* and 1929 –(Taranaki) Chinese Residents Cup Champions. (*Played as New Plymouth AFC)
- 1965 – Represented Taranaki in the regional representative – Central Districts League.
- 1966 – Promoted to Western League and finished third. Also played in the Taranaki – Wanganui League.
- 1967 – Joined Central Districts Premier League as founding member.
- 1971 – Promoted to Western League.
- 1972 – Western League runner-up.
- 1972 – Central League Qualifying tournament winner.
- 1972 – Promotion to Central League
- 1973 – Central League 2 Champions.
- 1973 – Promotion to Central League 1.
- 1976 – 1985 Western Tasman League. (Taranaki United composite side retained Central League position.)

==== 1979–present ====
- 1979 - Nimmo Cup (Moturoa Youth)
- 1985 – Western Tasman League Champions, Nimmo Cup & Duff Rose Bowl winners. 'City of New Plymouth' tournament winner.
- Promotion to the 1986 Central League.
- 1989 – Central League Two – 2nd (promoted to Central League One). Nimmo Cup winners.
- 1993 – Central League One – 2nd (promoted to Central Premier League).
- 1995 – Withdrew from Central League One and joined the Taranaki Premiership.
- 1999 – Promotion to Central League (Central League went into recess)
- 2000 – Joined new – Central Region Federation Premier League.
- (*Federation League position given to Team Taranaki in 2004.)
- Sheffield United F.C. Plate – 2019
- Taranaki Premiership (1986 - 2024) Champions: 1999, 2006, 2010, 2015, 2017, 2018, 2019, 2024

==== Duff Rose Bowl ====
- Champions: 1927, 1946, 1947, 1949, 1959, 1960, 1961, 1962, 1963, 1964, 1970, 1975, 1980, 1985, 2001, 2003, 2016, 2017, 2024

=== Women's ===
- Taranaki Women's Football Association – B Division Champions – 1981, 1992.
- Taranaki Women's Championship – 2010, 2011, 2012, 2013, 2014, 2019, 2021, 2022, 2023, 2024, 2025, 2026
- Taranaki Women's League Challenge Trophy – 2010, 2011, 2012, 2013, 2014, 2015, 2016, 2018, 2019, 2021, 2022, 2023, 2024, 2025, 2026
- Duchess Cup Champions – 2010, 2011, 2012, 2013, 2014, 2016, 2017, 2018, 2019, 2020, 2021, 2022, 2023, 2025
- Promotion to 2015 Women's Central League.
- Central Federation Cup Champions – 2011, 2013, 2019, 2022, 2023
- Central Federation Women's Premiership Champions – 2020, 2023
- 2024 Women's Central League promotion playoff winners v Horowhenua Coastal
- Promotion to 2024 Women's Central League
- Taranaki | Kimbaley Charity Cup - 2025, 2026

== Notable players ==
- Satish Datta °
- Glenn Dods *
- Stephen Douglas
- Simon Eaddy
- Peter Eliadis **
- Dylan Hall
- Paige Hareb
- Russell Irving
- Ted Meuli
- Harriet Muller
- Jana Neidermayr
- Lotsy Polyanszky
- Sanjay Singh
- Frank van Hattum *
- Attila Varga
- Lázsló (Laci) Varga
- George Yearbury ***

* Players marked with an asterisk have represented New Zealand internationally in the senior men's or women's side

** New Zealand "A" International

*** New Zealand U21 - 1974

° Fiji national football team
