= Central League 2 (New Zealand) =

- Founded: 1970; 56 years ago Revived: 2025; 1 year ago
- Folded: 1999; 27 years ago
- Country: New Zealand
- Confederation: OFC (Oceania)
- Number of clubs: 10
- Level on pyramid: 3
- Promotion to: Central League
- Relegation to: Western Premiership; Eastern Premiership; Capital Premier
- Domestic cup: Chatham Cup
- Last champions: Taradale (1st title) (2026)
- Most championships: FC Western (1 title); Taradale (1 title)
- Website: Capital Football
- Current: 2026 Central League 2

Central League 2 (MCL2) is an amateur status league run by Capital Football and Central Football for association football clubs located in the southern and central parts of the North Island.

Central League 2 is a New Zealand tier three competition during the New Zealand winter season. It sits below the Central League and above the Eastern Premiership, Western Premiership and Capital Premier.

== League history ==
The league started for the 2025 season after being officially announced in 2023.

Clubs of both federations showed support of reintroducing the competition with 85% of Central clubs and 79% of Capital clubs voting in favour of the league.

== League format ==
The league currently comprises 10 teams, who play each other twice in the season on a home-and-away basis and at the conclusion of the season the winner are crowned champions. The bottom side is relegated automatically to their regional league (either Capital Premier or Western and Eastern Premierships), with the top side automatically promoted to the Central League.

== Current clubs ==
Location of clubs in New Zealand for the 2026 Central League 2 season
Location of clubs in Wellington Region for the 2026 Central League season

As of the 2026 season.

Team	Home ground	Location	2025 season
Douglas Villa	Park Sports Ground	Masterton	3rd
Lower Hutt City	Fraser Park	Taitā, Lower Hutt	4th
North Wellington	Alex Moore Park	Johnsonville, Wellington	10th in Central League (relegated)
Palmerston North Marist	Central Energy Trust Arena Turf	Palmerston North Central, Palmerston North	7th
Palmerston North United	Memorial Park	Terrace End, Palmerston North	2nd
Seatoun	Seatoun Park	Seatoun, Wellington	9th
Stop Out	Hutt Park	Moera, Lower Hutt	6th
Taradale	Taradale Park	Taradale, Napier	8th
Tawa	Redwood Park	Tawa, Wellington	5th
Wainuiomata	Richard Prouse Park	Wainuiomata, Lower Hutt	3rd in Capital Premier (promoted via play-offs)

== Past winners ==
The following lists are from the 2025 season onwards. New Zealand Football reinstated the Central League second division after disbanding the initial competition at the end of the 1999 season.

From 2025, Central League 2 has again acted as the qualifier league to the Central League.

Numbers in parentheses indicate wins up to that date.

Season	Winner	Promoted to Central League	Promoted to Central League 2
2025	FC Western	FC Western	Wainuiomata
2026	Taradale	Taradale • North Wellington • Palmerston North United • Tawa	Whanganui Athletic • Greytown • Wellington Phoenix 4ths • Napier City Rovers Reserves

== Top scorers ==
Season	Top scorer(s)	Club(s)	Goals
2025	(New Zealand) Anthony Jones	Palmerston North United	21
2026	(New Zealand) Samuel Staunton	Tawa	23

== Past clubs ==
Club	Last Season	Position	Record								Replaced by
Club	Last Season	Position	Pld	W	D	L	GF	GA	GD	Pts	Replaced by
FC Western	2025	1st of 10	18	11	3	4	41	20	+21	36	North Wellington
Te Kotahitanga	2025	10th of 10	18	0	3	15	17	73	-56	3	Wainuiomata AFC

== Play-offs ==
2024 Central League 2 (2025) Play-off Series

14 September 2024 Play-off 1	Taradale	4–3	Victoria University	Palmerston North
14:00 NZST	Percy-Fysh 22', 61'; Bryan 45'; Madsen 89'	Report	Nicholson 45+'	Stadium: Massey University #8; Referee: Russell Underwood

14 September 2024 Play-off 2	Havelock North Wanderers	2–2 (a.e.t.)	Douglas Villa	Palmerston North
14:00 NZST	Sanko 57', 116'; Speers 59'	Report	Paine 65', 75'; McMenamin 92'; Maney 96' (o.g.)	Stadium: Massey University #9; Referee: Peter Linney

14 September 2024 Play-off 3	Te Kotahitanga	1–0	Gisborne Thistle	Palmerston North
14:00 NZST	Harmer 1'	Report		Stadium: Massey University #10; Referee: Ryan Todd

14 September 2024 Play-off 4	Seatoun	2–1	New Plymouth Rangers	Palmerston North
14:00 NZST	Jama 12'; Boyd 26'	Report	DeJohn 31'	Stadium: Massey University #11; Referee: Jet Norris

Taradale, Te Kotahitanga, Seatoun and Douglas Villa qualified for the 2025 – Central League 2.

Following the collapse of the Central Federation League, Havelock North Wanderers and Gisborne Thistle joined the 2025 Eastern Premiership. New Plymouth Rangers joined the 2025 Western Premiership. While Victoria University returned to the 2025 Capital Premier.

2025 Central League 2 (2026) Promotion Play-off Series.

Whanganui Athletic defeated Havelock North Wanderers in a two match series between the winners of the Eastern Premiership and Western Premiership to earn their playoff spot, while Wainuiomata qualified as the top first-team in Capital Premier League, having finished 3rd.

6 September 2025 First leg	Whanganui Athletic	3–1	Wainuiomata	Whanganui
14:45 NZST	R. Noon 53'; Z. Farmer 83'; C. Skea 90+1'; J. Joblin–Hall (red card) 90+5'	Report	F. McCaul 6'	Stadium: Wembley Park; Referee: Dylan Kawana-Waugh

13 September 2025 Second leg	Wainuiomata	4–1	Whanganui Athletic	Wainuiomata
14:45 NZST	B. Taylor 47'; C. Skea 49' (o.g.); A. Ross 60' (pen.); J. Brown 79'	Report	R. Noon 90+1'	Stadium: Richard Prouse Park; Referee: Dom Barry

Wainuiomata won 5 – 4 on aggregate and gained promotion to the 2026 Central League 2 competition. They replaced Te Kotahitanga who were relegated to the Capital Premier.

2026 Central League 2 (2027) Promotion Play-off Series.

22 August 2025 First leg	Whanganui Athletic	4–1	Gisborne United	Whanganui
12:00 NZST	R. Holden 20'; C. Petersen 28'; C. Petersen 45+2'; R. Holden 0', 86'		J. Somerton 62'	Stadium: Wembley Park

13 September 2025 Second leg	Gisborne United	1–2	Whanganui Athletic	Wainuiomata
13:00 NZST	J. Somerton 49'		A. Naprelac 26'; H. Stead 62'	Stadium: Harry Barker Reserve

Whanganui Athletic won the two-match series 6-2 on aggregate.

== Records ==
The following records are from the 2025 season onwards after the re–formation of Central League 2.

- Most wins in a season: 11 – FC Western (2025)
- Fewest defeats in a season: 4 – Taradale (2026), FC Western (2025)
- Most goals scored in a season: 51 – Palmerston North United (2nd) & Stop Out (6th) – both 2025
- Fewest goals conceded in a season: 19 – Taradale (2026)
- Most goals conceded in a season: 73 – Te Kotahitanga (2025)
- Most points in a season: 36 – FC Western (2025)
- Fewest points in a season: 3 – Te Kotahitanga (2025)
- Highest goal difference: +24 (51 for, 27 against) – Stop Out (2025)
- Lowest goal difference: -56 (17 for, 73 against) – Te Kotahitanga (2025)
- Biggest home win: 12 goals – Palmerston North United 12 – 0 Te Kotahitanga (2 August 2025)
- Biggest away win: 10 goals – Te Kotahitanga 0 – 10 Stop Out (20 July 2025)
- Highest scoring match: 12 goals – Palmerston North United 12 – 0 Te Kotahitanga (2 August 2025)
- Highest scoring draw: 4 goals – Seatoun 4 – 4 Lower Hutt City (29 March 2025) & Tawa 4 – 4 Stop Out (15 August 2026)
- Biggest title-winning margin: 5 points – 2025, FC Western (36 points) over Palmerston North United (31 points)
- Smallest title-winning margin: 1 point – 2026, Tawa (32 points) over North Wellington (31 points)
- Most goals in a single match: 4 goals – Anthony Jones, Palmerston North United, against Te Kotahitanga (2 August 2025)

=== Past Champions ===
2026 — Taradale Association Football Club

2025 — FC Western
