= Douglas Villa AFC =

New Zealand association football club

- Full name: Douglas Villa Association Football Club
- Nickname: The Magpies
- Founded: 1954
- Ground: Park Sports Ground, Masterton
- Manager: Mark Taylor
- League: Central League 2
- 2025: Central League 2, 3rd of 10
- Website: www.douglasvillaafc.co.nz

Douglas Villa AFC is an association football club from the Masterton, New Zealand currently competing in the Central League 2. The club is the largest in the Wairarapa region, fielding twenty-five junior teams in addition to its teen and senior sides.

== History ==
Douglas Villa AFC was founded in 1954. The club participated in the 2021 Chatham Cup, being drawn against Greytown FC in the Preliminary Round. With a 1–0 victory over Greytown, the club advanced to Round 1 in which they were eliminated by Tawa AFC 10–1.

== Recent seasons ==
Key

Champion Runners-up 3rd Place

Season	League								Chatham Cup	Notes
Season	League	Div.	Pos.	Pl.	W	D	L	P	Chatham Cup	Notes
2019	Wairarapa League	VIII	1st							Promoted to Capital League Four
2020	Capital League Four	VII	2nd	18	13	2	3	41		Promoted to Capital League Three
2021	Capital League Three	VI	2nd	18	12	3	3	39	Round 1	Promoted to Capital League Two
2022	Capital League Two	V	5th	18	6	3	9	21		
2023	Capital League Two	V	2nd	18	13	3	2	42		Promoted to Capital League One
2024	Capital League One	IV	2nd	18	14	0	4	42	Round 1	Promoted to Central League 2
2025	Central League 2	III								
