= Levin AFC =

- Full name: Levin Association Football Club
- Founded: 1959
- Ground: Donnelly Park, Levin
- League: Western Premiership
- 2026: Western Premiership, 2nd of 10
- Website: https://www.sporty.co.nz/levinsoccer

Levin AFC are a football club from New Zealand based in the Manawatū-Whanganui region of the North Island. The club competes in the Western Premiership. Its home ground is at Donnelly Park, Adkin Avenue in the town of Levin.

The club joined the Central Federation League in 2020.

Levin AFC has competed for the Chatham Cup since 1970, reaching the fourth round twice in 1986 and 1989.

Levin joined the Central League in 1976 and later won the Third Division in 1991. The club last competed in the Central League in 1997.

In 1969, under its original name Levin United, the club claimed the world record for Cot Pushing.

== Honours ==
• 1991 Central League Division Three Champions.

• 2019 Horizon Premiership Champions

• 2023 Easter Cup Winners

• 2024 Horizon Premiership Runners-Up

• 2024 Easter Cup Winners

- 2025 Western Premiership Runners-Up
