= Central League (New Zealand) =

- Organising body: Capital Football
- Country: New Zealand
- Confederation: OFC (Oceania)
- Number of clubs: 10
- Level on pyramid: 2
- Feeder to: National League
- Relegation to: Central League 2
- Current champions: Napier City Rovers (4th title) (2026)
- Most championships: Miramar Rangers; Wellington Olympic; Western Suburbs (7 titles)
- Most appearances: Gavin Hoy and Oliver Pickering (80)
- Top scorer: Hamish Watson (64)
- Broadcaster: FIFA+ (selected matches)
- Website: Capital Football
- Current: 2026 Central League

The Central League, known as the Dettol Central League for sponsorship reasons, is a competition run by the Capital Football for association football clubs located in the southern and central parts of the North Island. It is a New Zealand top-tier competition during the winter season, and sits at step two under the National League.

== League history ==
The premier league was initially set up as one of the three feeder leagues to the New Zealand National Soccer League in 1992, and continued in this form until being disbanded at the end of the 1999 season. The league was reinstated in 2005 as the top club league for the central region of New Zealand football, and the current strength of the league is demonstrated by it providing the past Chatham Cup winners in 2009 (Wellington Olympic), 2010 (Miramar Rangers), 2011 (Wairarapa United) and 2015 (Napier City Rovers).

=== Renaming and restructuring of leagues in the country ===
In March 2021, New Zealand Football announced a change to the structure of both the premiership and the top regional leagues around the country. The four top regional leagues (NRFL Premier, Central Premier League, Mainland Premier League and the FootballSouth Premier League) would be formed into the Northern League, Central League, and the Southern League. These leagues would allow local clubs to qualify for the premiership season (now known as the National League Championship), with the top 4 teams from the Northern League, the top 3 teams from the Central League, and the top 2 teams from the Southern League making up the competition, alongside the Wellington Phoenix Reserve side. All teams that qualify plus the Phoenix Reserves, would then play a single round-robin competition between September and December.

== League format ==
The league currently comprises 10 teams, who play each other twice in the season on a home-and-away basis. At the conclusion of the season the winner are crowned champions and with the next two sides proceed to the National League. The bottom side is relegated automatically to their regional league (either Capital Premier or the Federation League), with the top eligible sides from each of those leagues playing a two-legged playoff for promotion.

== Sponsorship ==
On 31 January 2025, New Zealand Football agreed a multi-year sponsorship deal with cleaning brand Dettol for naming rights of the National League (including the regional leagues) from the start of the 2025 season.

== Current clubs ==
Location of clubs in the North Island for the 2025 Central League season
Location of clubs in Wellington Region for the 2025 Central League season

As of the 2026 season.

Team	Home ground	Location	2025 season
FC Western	Lynmouth Park	New Plymouth	1st in Central League 2
Island Bay United	Wakefield Park	Island Bay, Wellington	9th
Miramar Rangers	David Farrington Park	Miramar, Wellington	2nd
Napier City Rovers	Bluewater Stadium	Napier	5th
Petone	Memorial Park	Petone, Lower Hutt	6th
Upper Hutt City	Maidstone Park	Maidstone, Upper Hutt	8th
Waterside Karori	Karori Park	Karori, Wellington	7th
Wellington Olympic	Wakefield Park	Island Bay, Wellington	1st
Wellington Phoenix Reserves	Fraser Park	Taitā, Lower Hutt	4th
Western Suburbs	Endeavour Park	Porirua	3rd

== 2022 Season ==
As of the 2022 season. Wairarapa United was entered as one of the originally 10 teams to play the 2022 season but withdrew with just two weeks to go before the start of the season. They were replaced by Wellington United who had originally missed out on promotion to Havelock North Wanderers.

Team	2022 season
Havelock North Wanderers	10th (relegated)
Miramar Rangers	2nd
Napier City Rovers	4th
North Wellington	7th
Petone	6th
Waterside Karori	5th
Wellington Olympic	1st
Wellington Phoenix Reserves	3rd
Wellington United	8th
Western Suburbs	9th

== Past clubs ==
As of 21 July 2026

Club	Location	Home Ground(s)	Last Played	Promoted Club
North Wellington	Wellington	Alex Moore Park	2025	FC Western
Stop Out	Lower Hutt	Hutt Park	2024	Upper Hutt City
Whanganui Athletic	Whanganui	Wembley Park	2023	Island Bay United
Wellington United	Wellington	Newtown Park	2022	Withdrew before the 2023 season and replaced by Whanganui Athletic
Havelock North Wanderers	Havelock North	Guthrie Park	2022	Stop Out
Wairarapa United	Masterton	Memorial Park	2021	Withdrew before the 2022 season and replaced by Wellington United.
Lower Hutt City	Lower Hutt	Fraser Park	2021	Wellington Phoenix Reserves
Wainuiomata	Wainuiomata	Richard Prouse Park	2021	Havelock North
Palmerston North Marist	Palmerston North	Central Energy Trust Arena	2017	Waterside Karori
Team Taranaki	New Plymouth	Yarrow Stadium	2017	Havelock North
Tawa	Tawa	Redwood Park	2015	Wellington United
Maycenvale United	Hastings	Hastings Sports Park	2012	Upper Hutt City
Gisborne City	Gisborne	Childers Road Reserve	2007	Withdrew end of season 2007. Replaced by Team Taranaki
Red Sox Manawatu	Palmerston North	Central Energy Trust Arena	2006	Team Taranaki
Raumati Hearts	Raumati, Kāpiti Coast	Weka Park	1999	League disbanded
Western Rangers FC	Hastings	St Leonard's Park	1999	League disbanded
Manawatu AFC	Palmerston North	Skoglund Park	1998	Promoted to the 1999 New Zealand island soccer leagues.
New Plymouth City	New Plymouth	Onuku Taipari Domain	1996	NP City renames as Mt. Taranaki. Placed in Division One for 1997. Folded at season's end.
Seatoun	Seatoun	Seatoun Park	1996	Placed in Division One for 1997, withdrew from Central League in 1998.
Stokes Valley	Stokes Valley, Lower Hutt	Delaney Park	1996	Withdrew from Central League at end of season
Tararua United	Upper Hutt	Harcourt Park	1996	Placed in Division One for 1997, merged in 1998 to become Upper Hutt City Soccer
Moturoa	New Plymouth	Onuku Taipari Domain	1994	Napier City Rovers

== Top scorers ==
The following list is from the 2021 season onwards after New Zealand Football changed the football league system in New Zealand. From 2021, the Central League has acted as a qualifier league to the National League.

Season	Top scorer(s)	Club(s)	Goals
2021	(New Zealand) George Ott	Lower Hutt City	21
2022	(New Zealand) Hamish Watson	Miramar Rangers	20
2023	(New Zealand) Matthew Brazier	Petone	18
2024	(New Zealand) Oscar Faulds	Napier City Rovers	21
2025	(Uruguay) Martín Bueno	Miramar Rangers	19
2026	(Uruguay) Martín Bueno (United States) Kyle Carr	Miramar Rangers; Western Suburbs	11

== Records ==
The following records are from the 2021 season onwards after New Zealand Football changed the football league system in New Zealand. From 2021, the Central League has acted as a qualifier league to the National League. The records are up to date as of the end of the 2026 season.

- **Most wins in a season: 17** – Wellington Olympic (2024)
- **Fewest defeats in a season: 1**
  - Wellington Olympic (2021, 2022, 2024 & 2025)
  - Miramar Rangers (2026)
- **Most goals scored in a season: 79** – Wellington Olympic (2023 & 2024)
- **Fewest goals conceded in a season: 13** –Wellington Olympic (2025)
- **Most points in a season: 51** – Wellington Olympic (2024)
- **Fewest points in a season: 4** – Wainuiomata (2021)
- **Highest goal difference: 63** – Wellington Olympic (2024)
- Biggest home win: – Miramar Rangers 12–0 FC Western (8 August 2026)
- **Biggest away win: –** Western Suburbs FC 1 - 11 Wellington Olympic (14 August 2022)
- **Highest scoring match: 13 goals** – Lower Hutt City 12–1 Wainuiomata (26 June 2021)
- Biggest title-winning margin: – 11 points, 2024, Wellington Olympic (51 points) over Western Suburbs (40 points)
- Smallest title-winning margin: – 2 points
  - 2026, Napier City Rovers (44 points) over Wellington Olympic (42 points)

=== Appearances ===
Rank	Player	Years	Apps
1	(New Zealand) **Oliver Pickering**	2021–2025	84
2	(New Zealand) **Scott Basalaj**	2021–2025	80
2	(Canada) **Gavin Hoy**	2021–2025	80
2	(New Zealand) **Joshua Zatorski**	2021–2025	80
5	(New Zealand) **Tor Davenport Petersen**	2021–2025	78
5	(England) **James Hoyle**	2021–2025	78
5	(New Zealand) **Cameron Emerson**	2021–2025	78
8	(England) **Sam Mason-Smith**	2021–2025	77
9	(New Zealand) **Luca Barclay**	2021–2025	75
9	(Cook Islands) **Benjamin Mata**	2021–2025	75
As of 30 August 2025; **Bolded** players still playing in Central League.

=== Top scorers ===
Rank	Player	Years	Goals	Apps	Ratio
1	(New Zealand) **Hamish Watson**	2021–2025	64	67	0.96
2	(New Zealand) **Jack-Henry Sinclair**	2021–2025	52	67	0.78
3	(New Zealand) **Sam Mason-Smith**	2021–2025	44	77	0.57
4	(New Zealand) **Gianni Bouzoukis**	2021–2025	42	51	0.82
5	(New Zealand) **Ihaia Delaney**	2021–2023, 2025	33	69	0.48
6	(England) Kailan Gould	2021–2023	31	49	0.63
6	(New Zealand) **Kieran McMinn**	2021–2025	31	69	0.45
6	(Cook Islands) **Benjamin Mata**	2021–2025	31	75	0.41
9	(Uruguay) **Martín Bueno**	2024–2025	30	28	1.07
10	(England) Jared Cunniff	2021, 2023–2024	26	40	0.65
10	(Argentina) **Tomas Alvarado**	2022–2025	26	58	0.45
As of 30 August 2025; **Bolded** players still playing in the Central League.

=== MVP Winners ===
Season	Winner(s)	Club(s)
2021	(New Zealand) Jonty Roubos	Wairarapa United
2022	(England) Jonathan McNamara	Napier City Rovers
2023	(New Zealand) Matthew Brazier	Petone
2024	(Argentina) Tomas Alvarado	Waterside Karori
2025	(New Zealand) Sam Lack	Napier City Rovers
2026	(England) Callum Cooke	Napier City Rovers

=== Past Champions ===
- 1992 – Wanganui East Athletic
- 1993 – Manawatu
- 1994 – Tawa
- 1995 – Wainuiomata
- 1996 – Western Suburbs
- 1997 – Miramar Rangers
- 1998 – Western Suburbs
- 1999 – Island Bay United
- 2000–2004 – no competition
- 2005 – Western Suburbs
- 2006 – Miramar Rangers
- 2007 – Western Suburbs
- 2008 – Miramar Rangers
- 2009 – Western Suburbs
- 2010 – Wellington Olympic
- 2011 – Miramar Rangers
- 2012 – Napier City Rovers
- 2013 – Miramar Rangers
- 2014 – Miramar Rangers
- 2015 – Napier City Rovers
- 2016 – Wellington Olympic
- 2017 – Western Suburbs
- 2018 – Napier City Rovers
- 2019 – Western Suburbs
- 2020 – Miramar Rangers
- 2021 – Wellington Olympic
- 2022 – Wellington Olympic
- 2023 – Wellington Olympic
- 2024 – Wellington Olympic
- 2025 – Wellington Olympic
- 2026 – Napier City Rovers
