= Napier Marist FC =

- Full name: Napier Marist Football Club
- Founded: 1987
- Ground: Park Island, Napier
- League: Hawke's Bay Division 2
- 2026: Hawke's Bay Division 2, 5th of 8
- Website: https://www.sporty.co.nz/napiermarist
Home colours	Away colours

Napier Marist are a football club from New Zealand based at Park Island in the Hawkes Bay region of the North Island and were formed in 1987 by a group of Napier based ex St John's College footballers. The club competes in the Hawke's Bay Division 2.

Napier Marist first entered the Central Federation League in 2019, previously having played in the Pacific Premiership.

The club has competed for the Chatham Cup since 2004 and have reached the third round twice, in 2017 and 2019.

== Honours ==
- Rod Pelosi Challenge Trophy - 2007
