= Frank Albrechtsen =

New Zealand footballer (1932–2021)

Personal information
- Full name: Frank Hillman Albrechtsen
- Date of birth: 16 March 1932
- Place of birth: New Plymouth, New Zealand
- Date of death: 20 June 2021 (aged 89)
- Position: Centre-half

Youth career
- 1946–1950: New Plymouth Boys' High School

Senior career*
Years	Team	Apps	(Gls)
1951–1952	New Plymouth Old Boys		

International career
1952	New Zealand	3	(0)
- * Club domestic league appearances and goals

Frank Hillman Albrechtsen (16 March 1932 – 20 June 2021) was a New Zealand association football player who represented New Zealand at international level.

== Biography ==
Born in New Plymouth and educated at New Plymouth Boys' High School,

Albrechtsen initially played for West End School. He then represented New Plymouth Boys High School. In 1950, while still playing for the High School, Albrechtsen was selected for the senior Taranaki representative side to play the Wellington Colts and later Wanganui. In 1951 Albrechtsen joined the New Plymouth Old Boys club and was selected to play for the North Island representative side.

In 1952 Albrechtsen was selected to play for New Zealand.

Albrechtsen played three official A-international matches and five non-cap friendlies for New Zealand on a ten match tour of Fiji and Tahiti. Albrechtsen won his international caps against Pacific neighbours Fiji, the first match a 2–0 win on 7 September, followed by 9-0 and 5-2 wins on 14 September and 16 September respectively.

His five non-cap matches for New Zealand were against, Suva F.C. Southern Districts, Lautoka F.C. and Northern Districts in Fiji, followed by a single match in Tahiti against a resident Chinese selection.

Albrechtsen died on 20 June 2021, at the age of 89.
