= North End AFC =

North End
- Full name: North End AFC
- Founded: 1974
- Ground: Memorial Park, Palmerston North
- League: Manawatu Division 1
- 2024: Manawatu Division 1, 3rd of 9
- Website: https://www.facebook.com/NorthEnd

North End are a football club from New Zealand based in the Palmerston North. Its home ground is at Memorial Park, and they have played in the Central Federation League since in 2018.

North End has competed for the Chatham Cup since 1977, reaching the fourth round twice in 2007 and 2009.
