= Ranui Swanson =

Ranui Swanson FC
- Full name: Ranui Swanson Football Club
- Founded: 1979; 47 years ago
- Ground: Starling Park, Glen Road, Rānui, West Auckland
- President: Rebecca Hochuli
- League: NRF Division 6 Central/West
- 2026: NRF Division 6 Central/West, 9th of 9
- Website: http://www.ranuiswansonfc.co.nz/
Home colours	Away colours

Ranui Swanson Football Club is an amateur football club in West Auckland, New Zealand. They currently compete in the NRF Division 6 Central/West, step 11 on the New Zealand football pyramid.

Ranui Swanson was formed in 1979, starting with 4 teams. Ranui's first season in the competition was in 1983 when they lost in the first round to Pt Chevalier 4–1.
