= Gisborne Thistle AFC =

Gisborne Thistle
- Full name: Gisborne Thistle Association Football Club
- Nickname: Thistle
- Founded: 1924
- Ground: Childers Road Reserve, Gisborne
- Coordinates: 38°39′38″S 178°00′52″E
- Chairman: Shannon Dowsing
- Coach: Tam Cramer
- League: Eastern Premiership
- 2026: Eastern Premiership, 3rd of 8
- Website: https://www.gisbornethistle.co.nz/
Home colours	Away colours

Gisborne Thistle AFC is an association football club based in the city of Gisborne, in the North Island of New Zealand. The club competes in the Eastern Premiership. For many years, the club played second-fiddle to neighbours Gisborne City (with whom they share the Childers Road Reserve ground). Their record includes appearances in the latter rounds of the Chatham Cup on numerous occasions, their best performances coming in 1970 and 1971 when they reached the fifth round.

Thistle joined the Central Federation League in 2005, winning the competition that same season and reached the Central League playoffs losing to Stop Out. The decision to withdraw from the league was taken in order to consolidate the team and to explore the concept of merging with City to form a new amalgamated "Team Gisborne".

== Chatham Cup ==
In 1929 Gisborne Thistle participated in the Chatham Cup competition for its first time, reaching the quarter-final, their best ever performance. Since that time they have twice reached the fifth round (last 32), in 1970 and 1971.

== Honours ==
1984 Central League - Division Three North

2005 Central Federation League
