= Warkworth AFC =

- Full name: Warkworth Association Football Club
- Founded: 1980
- Ground: Shoesmith Domain, Shoesmith Street, Warkworth, New Zealand
- Chairman: Michael Lewis
- Coach: Cameron Gray
- League: NRF Division 3
- 2026: NRF Division 3, 2nd of 10
Home colours	Away colours

Warkworth AFC is a semi-professional association football club in the town of Warkworth, New Zealand. The club competes in the NRF Division 3. They provide a football experience for all ages and ability.

== Honours ==
- US1 Premiership
  - Champions (1): 2010
