= New Zealand football league system =

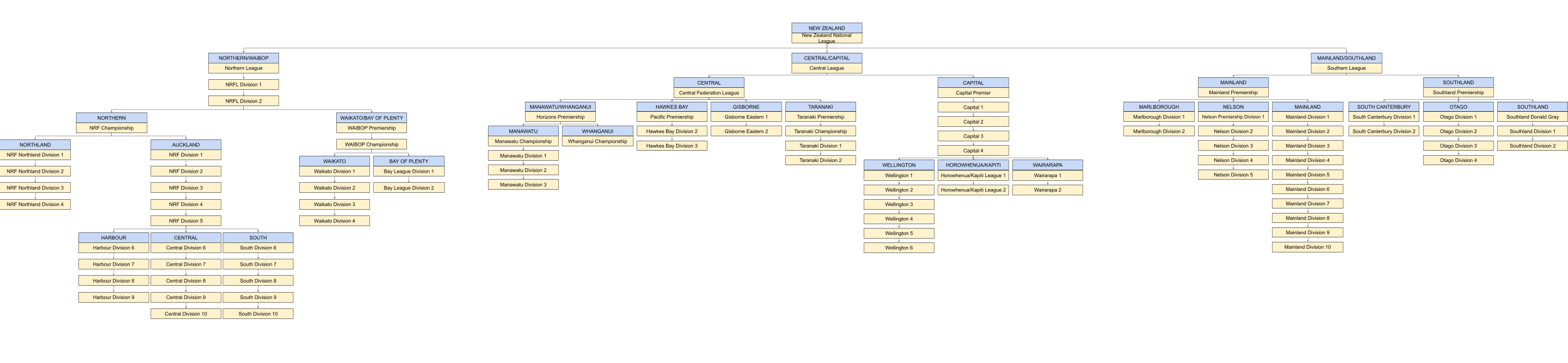
- A detailed layout of the league system, as of 2022
- Country: New Zealand
- Sport: Association football
- Promotion and relegation: Yes

National system
- Federation: New Zealand Football
- Confederation: OFC
- Top division: Men: National League; Women: Women's National League
- Second division: Men: Central League; Northern League; Southern League
- Cup competition: Men: Chatham Cup; Charity Cup; Women: Kate Sheppard Cup

The New Zealand league system is the structure of leagues nationally and regionally, updated for the 2021 season. The system previously had a path from grassroots to the top flight but that stopped in 2004, with the New Zealand Football Championship being created as a replacement to the former New Zealand National Soccer League.

The current top flight of New Zealand Football is the National League, which had its inaugural season in 2021.

The top 4 Divisions of the Northern Region Football leagues for both men and women (Tiers 2–5) were restructured for the 2023 season.

== Cups ==
The premier cup competition in New Zealand is the Chatham Cup which dates back to 1923.

Regional cup competitions are also run within federations, allowing multiple teams from the same club to enter.

== Men's structure ==
Clubs at the top of the pyramid are only permitted to enter a single team in their confederation's higher levels. Other teams from the same club are permitted to enter teams below this threshold, but have restrictions on promotion. Rodney District are currently the lowest ranked 1st team in the country, playing in NRF Harbour Division 9 (Tier 14).

Level	League(s)/division(s)						
1	New Zealand National League; 11 clubs (Note: 9 clubs qualify from regional leagues to join the Auckland FC Reserves and Wellington Phoenix Reserves, who both automatically qualify.)						
2 (provisionally)	Northern League; 12 clubs – 4 qualifications, 2 relegations		Central League; 10 clubs – 3 qualifications, 1 relegation		Southern League; 10 clubs – 2 qualifications, 1 relegation		
3	NRFL Championship; 12 clubs – 2 promotions, 2 relegations (Note: Promotion and relegation is dependent on regulations that only allow one team per club in the top grades)		Central League 2; 10 clubs - 1 promotion, 1 relegation		Canterbury Premiership League; 10 clubs – 0–1 promotions, 1 relegation	Nelson Bays Premiership League; 8 clubs – 0–1 promotions, 1 relegation	Southern Premiership; 10 clubs – 0–1 promotions, 0-1 relegations
4	NRFL Northern Conference; 8 clubs – 0–1 promotions, 1–2 relegations NRFL Southern Conference; 8 clubs – 0–1 promotions, 1–2 relegations		Western Premiership - 10 clubs - 1 qualification, 1 relegation Eastern Premiership - 8 clubs - 1 qualification, 1 relegation	Capital Premier – 10 clubs	Canterbury Championship League – 10 clubs	Nelson Bays Division 2 – 8 clubs Marlborough Division 1 – 4 clubs	South Canterbury Division 1 – 5 clubs Otago Division 1 – 8 clubs Southland Division 1 – 6 clubs
5	NRF League One; 8 clubs 1 promotion	WaiBOP League One; 10 clubs – 1 promotion		Capital 1 – 10 clubs	Canterbury Division 1 – 10 clubs	Nelson Division 3 – 6 clubs Marlborough Division 2 – 8 clubs	South Canterbury Division 2 – 5 clubs Otago Division 2 – 7 clubs Southland Division 2 – 6 clubs
6	NRF Northland Division 1 – 8 clubs NRF Division 1 – 10 clubs	Waikato Division 1 – 8 clubs Bay League Division 1 – 6 clubs	Horizons Championship – 8 clubs Hawke's Bay Championship – 7 clubs Tairāwhiti Championship – 11 clubs Taranaki Championship – 7 clubs	Capital 3 – 10 clubs	Canterbury Division 2 – 10 clubs Nelson Division 4 – 8 clubs		South Canterbury Division 3 – 7 clubs Otago Division 3 – 8 clubs Southland Division 2 – 12 clubs
7	NRF Northland Division 2 – 6 clubs NRF Division 2 – 10 clubs Waikato Division 2 – 10 clubs Bay League Division 2 – 6 clubs		Manawatu Division 2 - 6 clubs Hawkes Bay Division 2 - 6 clubs Taranaki Division 2 - 8 clubs Roly Taylor Championship (Whanganui) - 9 clubs	Capital 4 - 10 clubs	Canterbury Division 3 – 8 clubs Otago Division 4 – 11 clubs		
8	NRF Northland Division 3 – 8 clubs NRF Division 3 – 10 clubs Waikato Division 3 – 10 clubs Bay League Division 2B – 6 clubs		Wellington 1 – 10 clubs Horowhenua/Kapiti Local League 1 – 9 clubs Wairarapa 1 – 6 clubs Manawatu Division 3 – 9 clubs Hawke's Bay Division 3 – 12 clubs Taranaki Division 3 - 12 clubs		Canterbury Division 4 – 8 clubs		
9	NRF Northland Division 4 – 9 clubs NRF Division 4 – 10 clubs Waikato Division 4 – 10 clubs Bay League Division 3 – 7 clubs		Wellington 2 – 10 clubs Horowhenua/Kapiti Local League 2 – 6 clubs Wairarapa 2/3 – 14 clubs		Canterbury Division 5 – 8 clubs		
10	NRF Division 5 – 12 clubs		Wellington 3 – 10 clubs		Canterbury Division 6 – 8 clubs		
11	NRF Harbour Division 6 – 10 clubs NRF Central Division 6 – 10 clubs NRF South Division 6 – 9 clubs		Wellington 4 – 10 clubs		Canterbury Division 7 – 7 clubs		
12	NRF Harbour Division 7 – 9 clubs NRF Central Division 7 – 10 clubs NRF South Division 7 – 10 clubs		Wellington 5 – 16 clubs		Canterbury Division 8 – 7 clubs		
13	NRF Harbour Division 8 – 10 clubs NRF Central Division 8 – 9 clubs NRF South Division 8 – 10 clubs		—		Canterbury Division 9 – 7 clubs		
14	NRF Harbour Division 9 – 10 clubs NRF Central Division 9 – 10 clubs NRF South Division 9 – 8 clubs		—		Canterbury Division 10 – 7 clubs		
15	NRF Harbour Division 10 – 9 clubs NRF Central Division 10 – 9 clubs		—		—		

== Women's structure ==
Level	League(s)/division(s)					
1	New Zealand Women's National League; 10 clubs (Note: 4 clubs qualify from Northern Premiership to join Canterbury United Pride, Central Football, Southern United, Wellington Phoenix Reserves and two Capital Football federation sides representing the Central Conference, who all automatically qualify.)					
2	NRFL Women's Premiership; 8 clubs – 4 qualifications, 1 relegation		CF Women's Central League; 10 clubs – 3 qualifications (1 x automatic/Wellington Phoenix ) 1 relegation		South Island League – 9 clubs	
3	NRFL Women's Championship; 8 clubs – 1 promotion, 1 relegation		Central Women's Federation League – 5 clubs	Women's Capital Premier; 8 clubs – 1 promotion, 1 relegation	Canterbury Women's Premiership League – 7 clubs	Women's Southern Premier League – 7 clubs
4	NRF Women's Conference; 6 clubs – 0–1 promotions	WaiBOP W-League; 6 clubs – 0–1 promotions	Manawatu Premiership – 6 clubs Whanganui Kelly Hiroa League – 8 clubs Hawke's Bay Women's Division 1 – 5 clubs Gisborne Eastern League – 6 clubs Taranaki Women's Premiership – 12 clubs	Capital Women's 1 – 10 clubs	Canterbury Women's Championship League – 8 clubs Nelson Women's Premiership Division 1 – 11 clubs Marlborough Women's Social League – 3 clubs	Otago Division One – 6 clubs Southland Kolk Cup – 7 clubs
5	NRF Women's Northland Division 1 – 5 clubs NRF Women's Division 1 – 8 clubs Waikato Women's Division 1 – 8 clubs Women's Bay League Division 1 – 9 clubs		Manawatu Women's Championship – 6 clubs Hawkes Bay Women's Division 2 – 7 clubs	Capital Women's 2 – 10 clubs	—	Otago Division Two – 8 clubs
6	NRF Northland Women's Division 2 – 6 clubs NRF Women's Division 2 – 10 clubs Waikato Women's Division 2 – 9 clubs		—	Capital Women's 3 – 11 clubs	—	—
7	NRF Harbour Division 3 – 7 clubs NRF Central Division 3 – 9 clubs		—	Wairarapa League – 4 clubs	—	—
8	NRF Harbour Division 4 – 10 clubs NRF Central Division 4 – 8 clubs		—	—	—	—
9	NRF Central Division 5 – 7 clubs		—	—	—	—
