= Whanganui Athletic FC =

Association football club in New Zealand

Whanganui Athletic
- Full name: Whanganui Athletic Football Club
- Nickname: WAFC
- Founded: 1929
- Ground: Wembley Park, Whanganui
- League: Western Premiership
- 2026: Western Premiership, 1st of 10 (promoted via play-offs)
- Website: https://www.sporty.co.nz/wafc/fixtures/mens
Home colours	Away colours

Whanganui Athletic FC are an association football team based in the New Zealand North Island city of Whanganui. The club competes in the Western Premiership. They are traditionally the strongest team from the city, and played in the top flight of New Zealand football in both league and cup competitions. The team was founded in 1929 as Wanganui East Athletic, but briefly changed their name to Wanganui FC between 1974 and 1976 before reverting to their original name before dropping the East to just become Wanganui Athletic, changing to Whanganui Athletic when their home city was officially renamed.

== National competition ==
Athletic played in the 1993, 1994, and 1995 regional superclub championships, reaching the national league stage in 1993, where they finished seventh.

Athletic reached the last 16 stage of New Zealand's premier knockout cup competition, the Chatham Cup in 1970, and went one stage further to become quarter-finalists in 1996.

After the clubs 19-2 undefeated at home season they were able to secure promotion into the Central League (New Zealand) for the 2023 season. During the 2023 season they won their first Central League (New Zealand) game in 27 years.

== Women's First Team ==
The Whanganui Athletic women's first team currently competes in Manawatu Division 1 having first joined the league in 2013. During their inaugural season they stunned New Zealand football by going undefeated on the season and scoring a staggering 146 goals. With this dominance they were able to win the 2013 Federation Cup.

== Wembley Park ==
Athletic has called Wembley Park home since its inception. After building new clubrooms in 1984 they were used for the club, while also being home to many events within the community. As historic as the old clubrooms are, in 2021 club president Peter Czerwonka decided it was time for improvements and introduced plans for new clubrooms due to be completed in 2022. Despite introducing the plans in 2021, the club had to go through three years of fundraising and planning before construction on the new clubrooms began. Although the club believed construction would only take one year, it would end up taking until 2025 for the club rooms to finish construction. The club was able to sign a 30-year lease with the district council for ownership of the brand new, 2-storey $2.4 million clubrooms. Club president Peter Czerwonka hopes that the clubrooms will not just be a big win for Athletic, but for Whanganui as a whole.

== Honors ==
- Wanganui Championship – 1933, 1937, 1939, 1948, 1949, 1950, 1955, 1958, 1962, 1965, 1967
- 1969 Western League
- 1981 Central League Division Two
- 1987 Central League Division Three North
- 1992 Central League Premier Division
- 1993 Taranaki Premiership (Athletic Thirds)
- 1994 Central Super-club Plate
- 1996 Central Super-club Championship
- 2010 Western Premiership Championship
- 2013 Federation Cup
- 2014 Federation League Championship
- 2022 Central Federation League
- 2023 Federation Cup Champions
- 2025 YORB Western Premiership

== New Zealand Representation From Whanganui Athletic ==
- Hayden Englefield (U-20, U-23)
- James Musa (U-20, National team)
- Brad Scott (National team)

== Wanganui United ==
In 2009 the team entered a partnership with local rivals Wanganui City to form a top-level team, Wanganui United, with both clubs feeding the squad. The idea behind this was to push the level of football in Wanganui. The idea was short-lived; after the 2010 season Wanganui United disbanded, with the players released back to their respective clubs.
