= Lower Hutt City AFC =

Lower Hutt City
- Nickname: The Yellows
- Founded: 1968
- Ground: Fraser Park, Lower Hutt
- Chairman: Kevin Nash
- Coach: Adam Reynard
- League: Central League 2
- 2026: Central League 2, 7th of 10
- Website: www.lhcafc.org.nz
Home colours	Away colours

Lower Hutt City AFC is an association football club in Lower Hutt, New Zealand. They currently compete in the Central League 2. From 2019 until 2022, they had a close association with the Wellington Phoenix, allowing Phoenix youth players to play within the Capital Football leagues.

== Club history ==
The club formed in 1967 with the amalgamation of two existing clubs, Lower Hutt City (formed in 1921) and Railways (formed in 1942). The club also competed under the name Hutt City during its only National League season, 1997–1998.

== Staff and board members ==
As of November 2024.

Position	Name	Nationality
First Team Coach	Adam Reynard	New Zealander
Chairman	Kevin Nash	British
