= Palmerston North Marist FC =

Palmerston North Marist
- Full name: Palmerston North Marist Football Club
- Nickname: Marist
- Founded: 1988
- Chairman: Adrian Smith
- League: Central League 2
- 2026: Central League 2, 5th of 10
Home colours

Marist is an amateur association football club in Palmerston North, New Zealand, playing in the Women's Central League and the Central League 2. Formed in 1988, it is part of Palmerston North Marist Sports Club, a multi-sport organisation which caters for football, cricket, tennis, hockey, netball, rugby union, and squash.

The club's best performance in national competition came in the 2005 Chatham Cup. They reached the final, but were defeated by Auckland's Central United by two goals to one.

== Staff and committee members ==
- Chairman: Adrian Smith
- Club Administrator: Lisa Smith
- Director of Football: Connor-Jake "CJ" Price
- Men's First Team Coach: Adam Cowan
- Women's First Team Coach: Mikaela Bouwmeester
