= North Wellington AFC =

North Wellington FC
- Full name: North Wellington Football Club
- Founded: 1972
- Ground: Alex Moore Park, Johnsonville, Wellington
- Coach: DoF Tate Macpherson, Men’s - Curtis Jones, Women’s - Ben Coom
- League: Central League 2
- 2026: Central League 2, 2nd of 10 (promoted)
- Website: northwellingtonfootball.com
Home colours	Away colours

North Wellington FC is an association football club based in the northern suburbs of Wellington, New Zealand. The men's first team currently compete in the Central League 2 and their women's first team currently compete in the Women's Capital Premier.

== History ==
=== Early history ===
It was founded in 1972 as an amalgamation of the Onslow (founded 1934) & Johnson Villa ( founded 1951), with the club colours of sky blue & claret originating from the Johnson Villa. In 1992 Newlands-Paparangi United folded and was merged within the club. The 2 local junior football clubs (Onslow Junior Football & North Wellington Junior Football) are affiliated to the club.

The club entered 19 (15 men & 4 women) teams in senior football in the Capital Football leagues for the 2014 season (21 in 2013), which commenced in early April and concluded on 31 August. The club's home ground is Alex Moore Park, Johnsonville, Wellington, a ground it shares with Johnsonville Softball Club. The men's senior team currently plays in the Capital One League, immediately below the Capital Premier League. The team played in the Central Premier League and its predecessors in 1992-2000 and 2005–2006, finishing second in 1996. North Wellington's best performance in the Chatham Cup came in 1997, when they reached the quarter-finals before losing to Mount Wellington 3-2. The following season they reached the fifth round (last 16 stage). Johnson Villa had previously reached the fourth round (last 32 stage) in 1970, as had Newlands-Paparangi in 1975.

=== 2010s ===
For the 2013 season the club appointed Stephen Maclaren to replace Iain MacIntyre as coach of the men's senior team. It finished in 8th place of the 10-team Capital One league, which led to their relegation. However, the Capital Football Board decision re-instated the team in the 2014 season. They finished in 4th place, despite a latter season run of 9 wins in 10 games, and lost 2-0 in the 1st round of the Chatham Cup against Miramar Rangers AFC who reached the semi-final stage.

In the 2014 season, the men's senior team had a change of coach on 15 May, with Stephen Maclaren resigning after 4 league games in the Capital One League. The team finished in 3rd place of the 11 teams, narrowly missing promotion, with a season record of 14 wins, 1 draw and 5 losses. The Chatham Cup 1st round fixture (North Wellington 0 Wellington Olympic 12) on 10 May was the Club's 80th in this national club knock-out competition. The Women's senior team is coached by Darren Rewi in the Women's Premier League, and the team finished in 8th place of 8 teams with a season record of 0 wins, 1 draw and 13 losses.
