= New Plymouth Rangers =

New Plymouth Rangers AFC
- Full name: New Plymouth Rangers Association Football Club
- Founded: 1993
- Ground: Merrilands Domain, New Plymouth
- Chairman: Monty Ammundsen
- League: Western Premiership
- 2026: Western Premiership, 5th of 10
Home colours	Away colours

New Plymouth Rangers is an amateur association football club based in New Plymouth, New Zealand. The team play at Merrilands Domain. The club has men's and women's senior and social teams, as well as over a dozen junior teams. The club competes in the Western Premiership.

== History ==
Founded as New Plymouth Old Boys in 1940.

New Plymouth United was founded in 1965 and based at Lynmouth Park.

New Plymouth Old Boys entered the Central League for its first time in 1971.

In 1973 New Plymouth United merged on trial with Moturoa for a single season as Moturoa United, playing in the Western League and the Central League Division Two. United left the arrangement in early 1974.

In early 1974 New Plymouth Old Boys joined with Central City to become New Plymouth City with the arrangement lasting for two seasons.

In mid 1975 Taranaki United was formed as a local composite side to play in the Central League, taking over from Moturoa in the Central League Division Two for the last remaining games of season, before being relegated to the Central League Division Three (North) for the 1976 season. The amalgamation continued until 1984 when New Plymouth Old Boys replaced Taranaki United for the 1985 Central League. Central City broke away from Taranaki United in 1983, reforming New Plymouth City for an entry into the 1983 Central League.

In 1987 Old Boys won the Central League Division Two and in 1989 won the Central League Division One and promotion to the 1990 New Zealand National League. After a restructuring of the league system by the NZFA in 1993, New Plymouth Rangers entered the New Zealand Superclub League, in which it competed for three seasons until the competition was scrapped by the NZFA at the end of 1995.

New Plymouth United won the 1992 Central League Division Three after its first season in the competition before amalgamating with Old Boys at the end of that year and competing in the 1993 Central League Division Two as New Plymouth Rangers.

In 2017 New Plymouth Rangers entered the Central Federation League for the first time. The club won the 2020 Central Federation League before being relegated at the end of the 2021 season to the Taranaki Premiership.

=== Chatham Cup ===
New Plymouth Old Boys and New Plymouth United both competed for the Chatham Cup. Old Boys reached the later stages of the competition as Taranaki regional champions in 1951 and 1955, also reaching the Quarter-finals of the cup in 1988 and 1989. These feats have not yet been equalled by the club under its new name, though Rangers did reach the Fifth Round (last 16 stage) in the 1995 competition.

== See also ==
- New Plymouth Rangers players
- Frank Albrechtsen
