= Tawa AFC =

Tawa
- Full name: Tawa AFC
- Founded: 1971
- Ground: Redwood Park, Tawa
- League: Central League 2
- 2026: Central League 2, 3rd of 10 (promoted)
Home colours	Away colours

Tawa AFC is an association football club in Tawa, Wellington, New Zealand. They currently compete in the Central League 2.

Tawa highest men's honour is winning the, as then known, Central League in 1994. Since then, their second best finish was in 2009 when they won the Capital Premier League.

The highest honour Tawa has got in the Women's game is winning the Wellington Premier Women's League in 2005.
