= Stop Out Sports Club =

Stop Out
- Full name: Stop Out Sports Club
- Founded: 1919 as Moera Stop Out
- Ground: Hutt Park, Lower Hutt
- Chairman: Chris Sambrooke
- Coach: James Sutcliffe
- League: Central League 2
- 2026: Central League 2, 8th of 10
Home colours	Away colours

Stop Out Sports Club, commonly known as Stop Out, is an association football club in Lower Hutt, New Zealand is based at Hutt Park, Moera in Lower Hutt. The club competes in the Central League 2.

== History ==
Chart of yearly ladder positions for Stop Out in NZ 1st division soccer

The Stop Out organisation started in 1919 with the aim of providing recreation to Te Aro Flat children in Wellington associated with the Wellington City Mission so as to prevent them becoming "stop outs" – period slang for "troubled youth". The club has been involved in a myriad of sports, including Boxing, Athletics and Softball; however, these days football is the heart and soul of the club.

Despite the change of sporting-code focus, the club highly values the founding principles and continues to abide by them. The football branch, established in 1929 as the club Moera Stop Out, changed its name to Stop Out in 1932. The club won the Chatham Cup in 1956, and was runner-up in the National League in 1977. In 1983 and 1984 Stop Out won the Central League title.

In the 2006 season, club's men's first team played in Central League for the first time in over a decade however at the 2008 season the team was relegated again to the Capital Premier League. After promotion in 2014, they once again played in the Central League

In men's football Stop Out were the 2014 Capital Premier League champions, a title they also won in 2013.

The Women's first team has also won the Capital Premier Women's League in 2011 and again in 2013 as well as being runners-up in the Kelly Cup in 2015.

Chatham Cup
Preceded by Western	Winner; 1956 Chatham Cup	Succeeded by Seatoun
