= Wainuiomata AFC =

- Full name: Wainuiomata Association Football Club
- Founded: 1959
- Ground: Richard Prouse Park, Wainuiomata, Lower Hutt
- Coach: Pedro Garcias
- League: Central League 2
- 2026: Central League 2, 9th of 10
- Website: www.sporty.co.nz/wainuiomatafootball/
Home colours

Wainuiomata is an association football club in New Zealand, based in the Lower Hutt suburb of Wainuiomata. The club was founded in 1959 and was a founding member of the Wellington Central League. It includes seven men's teams and two women's teams, as well as over 20 youth sides. The senior men's team plays in the Central League 2.

== Notable former players ==
- Malcolm Dunford
- Dave Houghton
- Tremaine Rimene-Albrett
- Grant Turner
