= List of Chatham Cup finals =

The Chatham Cup, is a knockout competition in New Zealand football, organised by New Zealand Football. It is the oldest existing national football competition in New Zealand, having commenced in the 1923 season. The tournament is open to all clubs in New Zealand football league system, although a club may only enter one team into the tournament. Secondary schools are also eligible to enter. The competition culminates at the end of the league season (usually in September) with the Chatham Cup Final.

The vast majority of Chatham Cup Final matches have been in Wellington: most of these were played at the Basin Reserve. The other venues used for the final on a regular basis are Athletic Park and Newton Park, both in Wellington, North Harbour Stadium and Newmarket Park in Auckland and McLean Park in Napier.

As of 2026, the record for the most wins is held by Christchurch United and University-Mount Wellington with 7 victories each. The cup has been won by the same team in two or more consecutive years on eight occasions, and three teams have won 3 consecutive finals: Waterside, Christchurch United and Waitakere City. The cup is currently held by Fencibles United, who defeated Cashmere Technical in the 2026 final.

== Results ==
Key to list of winners
(R)	Replay
*	Match went to extra time
†	Match decided via a penalty shoot-out after extra time
&	Title was shared after match finished in a draw
‡	Winning team won the Double (League title and Chatham Cup)
Italics	Team from outside the top level of New Zealand football (since the formation of the New Zealand National Soccer League in 1970 (Note: Excluding 2004—2019, when the New Zealand Football Championship was active, as Tier 1 sides were ineligible to compete in the Chatham Cup.)

- The "Season" column refers to the season the competition was held, and wikilinks to the article about that season.
- The wikilinks in the "Score" column point to the article about that season's final game.

Chatham Cup finals
Season	Champion	Score	Runner-up	Venue	Attendance
1923	Seacliff	4–0	Wellington YMCA	Athletic Park	—
1924	Auckland Harbour Board	3–1 *	Seacliff	Athletic Park	—
1925	Wellington YMCA	3–2 *	Seacliff	Newtown Park	—
1926	Sunnyside	4–2	North Shore	Basin Reserve	—
1927	Ponsonby	3–2	Northern	Newtown Park	—
1928	Petone	1–0	Northern	Basin Reserve	—
1929	Tramways	4–0	Seacliff	Basin Reserve	—
1930	Petone	2–1	Western	Basin Reserve	—
1931	Tramurewa	5–2 *	Nomads	Basin Reserve	—
1932	Wellington Marist	5–0	Millerton All Blacks	Basin Reserve	—
1933	Ponsonby	2–1	Millerton All Blacks	Basin Reserve	—
1934	Auckland Thistle	2–1	Christchurch Thistle	Basin Reserve	—
1935	Hospital	3–1	Western	Basin Reserve	—
1936	Western	3–2	Auckland Thistle	Basin Reserve	—
1937 competition cancelled due to lack of entries
1938	Waterside (Wellington)	4–0	Mosgiel	Basin Reserve	4,000
1939	Waterside (Wellington)	4–2	Western	Basin Reserve	—
1940	Waterside (Wellington)	6–2	Mosgiel	Basin Reserve	—
1941–44 – no competition due to World War II
1945	Western	4–3 *	Wellington Marist	Basin Reserve	—
1946	Wellington Marist	2–1	Technical Old Boys	Basin Reserve	—
1947	Waterside (Wellington)	2–1	Technical Old Boys	Basin Reserve	6,000
1948	Technical Old Boys	2–0	Waterside (Wellington)	Basin Reserve	—
1949	Petone Settlers	2–0	Northern	Basin Reserve	—
1950	Eden	3–2 *	Technical Old Boys	Basin Reserve	—
1951	Eastern Suburbs	5–1	Northern	Basin Reserve	—
1952	North Shore United Western	1–1 ^{&}	—	Basin Reserve	—
1953	Eastern Suburbs	4–3	Northern	Basin Reserve	—
1954	Onehunga	1–0	Western	Basin Reserve	—
1955	Western	6–2	Eastern Suburbs	Basin Reserve	—
1956	Stop Out	4–1	Shamrock	Basin Reserve	—
1957	Seatoun	3–1	Technical Old Boys	Basin Reserve	—
1958	Seatoun	7–1	Christchurch City	Basin Reserve	—
1959	Northern	3–2	North Shore United	Basin Reserve	7,000
1960	North Shore United	5–3	Technical Old Boys	Basin Reserve	7,500
1961	Northern	2–0	North Shore United	Basin Reserve	7,000
1962	Hamilton Technical Old Boys	4–1	Northern	Basin Reserve	—
1963	North Shore United	4–1	Nomads	Basin Reserve	—
1964	Mount Roskill	3–1	King Edward TCOB	Basin Reserve	—
1965	Eastern Suburbs	4–1	Saint Kilda	Basin Reserve	—
1966	Miramar Rangers	1–0	Western	Basin Reserve	—
1967	North Shore United	2–1	Christchurch City	Basin Reserve	—
1968	Eastern Suburbs	2–0	Christchurch Technical	Basin Reserve	—
1969	Eastern Suburbs	2–0	New Brighton	Basin Reserve	—
1970	Blockhouse Bay ‡	2–2 *	Western Suburbs	Basin Reserve	—
1970	Blockhouse Bay ‡	3–2 (R)	Western Suburbs	Newmarket Park	—
1971	Western Suburbs	3–2 *	Wellington City	Basin Reserve	—
1972	Christchurch United	4–4 *	Mount Wellington	Basin Reserve	—
1972	Christchurch United	1–1 (R)*	Mount Wellington	English Park	—
1972	Christchurch United	2–1 (R)	Mount Wellington	Newmarket Park	—
1973	Mount Wellington	3–0	North Shore United	Newmarket Park	—
1974	Christchurch United	2–0	Wellington Diamond United	Queen Elizabeth II Park	—
1975	Christchurch United ‡	4–2 *	Blockhouse Bay	Newmarket Park	—
1976	Christchurch United	4–0	Eastern Suburbs	Queen Elizabeth II Park	—
1977	Nelson United	1–0	Mount Wellington	Newmarket Park	—
1978	Manurewa	1–0	Nelson United	Trafalgar Park	—
1979	North Shore United	2–1	Mount Wellington	McLennan Park	—
1980	Mount Wellington ‡	2–0	Dunedin City	Basin Reserve	—
1981	Dunedin City	3–1	Mount Wellington	Basin Reserve	—
1982	Mount Wellington ‡	1–0 *	Miramar Rangers	Basin Reserve	—
1983	Mount Wellington	2–2 *	Gisborne City	Childers Road Reserve	—
1983	Mount Wellington	2–0 (R)	Gisborne City	Bill McKinlay Park	—
1984	Manurewa	2–1	Gisborne City	Mount Smart Stadium	—
1985	Napier City Rovers	3–1	North Shore United	Mount Smart Stadium	—
1986	North Shore United	0–1	Mount Maunganui	Fuji Film Stadium	—
1986	North Shore United	4–1 (Note: North Shore won 4–2 on aggregate.)	Mount Maunganui	Links Road Ground	—
1987	Gisborne City	5–1	Christchurch United	Childers Road Reserve	—
1987	Gisborne City	2–2 (Note: Gisborne won 7–3 on aggregate.)	Christchurch United	Queen Elizabeth II Park	—
1988	Waikato United	2–2	Christchurch United	Queen Elizabeth II Park	—
1988	Waikato United	1–1 (Note: Aggregate score 3–3. Waikato won on away goals.)	Christchurch United	Muir Park	—
1989	Christchurch United	7–1	Rotorua City	Newtown Park	—
1990	Mount Wellington	3–3 † (Note: Score was 3–3 after extra time. Mount Wellington won the penalty shoot-out 4–2.)	Christchurch United	Basin Reserve	—
1991	Christchurch United ‡	2–1	Wellington United	Basin Reserve	—
1992	Miramar Rangers	3–1	Waikato United	Basin Reserve	—
1993	Napier City Rovers ‡	6–0	Christchurch Rangers	McLean Park	—
1994	Waitakere City	1–0	Wellington Olympic	McLean Park	—
1995	Waitakere City ‡	4–0	North Shore United	McLean Park	—
1996	Waitakere City ‡	3–1	Mount Wellington	Park Island Ground	—
1997	Central United	3–2 *	Napier City Rovers	Park Island Ground	—
1998	Central United	5–0	Dunedin Technical	North Harbour Stadium	—
1999	Dunedin Technical	4–0	Waitakere City	North Harbour Stadium	—
2000	Napier City Rovers ‡	4–1	Central United	North Harbour Stadium	—
2001	University-Mount Wellington	3–3 † (Note: Score was 3–3 after extra time. Mount Wellington won the penalty shoot-out 5–4.)	Central United	North Harbour Stadium	—
2002	Napier City Rovers	2–0	Tauranga City United	Bluewater Park Island	—
2003	University-Mount Wellington	3–1	Melville United	North Harbour Stadium	—
2004	Miramar Rangers	1–0 *	Waitakere City	North Harbour Stadium	—
2005	Central United	2–1	Palmerston North Marist	North Harbour Stadium	—
2006	Western Suburbs	0–0 † (Note: Score was 0–0 after extra time. Western Suburbs won the penalty shoot-out 3–0.)	Eastern Suburbs	North Harbour Stadium	—
2007	Central United	0–0 † (Note: Score was 0–0 after extra time. Central won the penalty shoot-out 10–9.)	Western Suburbs	Kiwitea Street	—
2008	East Coast Bays	1–0	Dunedin Technical	North Harbour Stadium	—
2009	Wellington Olympic	2–1	Three Kings United	North Harbour Stadium	—
2009	Miramar Rangers	3–1	Bay Olympic	North Harbour Stadium	—
2011	Wairarapa United	2–1	Napier City Rovers	Memorial Park	—
2012	Central United	6–1	Lower Hutt City	Newtown Park	—
2013	Cashmere Technical	3–1	Waitakere City	English Park	—
2014	Cashmere Technical	2–1	Central United	QBE Stadium	2,761
2015	Eastern Suburbs	2–1	Napier City Rovers	Trusts Arena	—
2016	Birkenhead United	3–2 *	Waitakere City	QBE Stadium	4,200
2017	Onehunga Sports	3–3 † (Note: Score was 3–3 after 90 minutes and extra time. Onehunga won the penalty shoot-out 6–5.)	Central United	QBE Stadium	—
2018	Birkenhead United	1–1 † (Note: Score was 1–1 after 90 minutes and extra time. Birkenhead won the penalty shoot-out 5–4.)	Western Suburbs	QBE Stadium	3,364
2019	Napier City Rovers	3–2	Melville United	North Harbour Stadium	—
The 2020 competition was cancelled due to COVID-19
2021	Cashmere Technical	4–2	Miramar Rangers	Jerry Collins Stadium	0 (Note: Played behind closed doors.)
2022	Auckland City ‡	1–0	Eastern Suburbs	North Harbour Stadium	2,839
2023	Christchurch United	2–2 † (Note: Score was 2–2 after 90 minutes and extra time. Christchurch United won the penalty shoot-out 4–2.)	Melville United	North Harbour Stadium	—
2024	Wellington Olympic	1–1 † (Note: Score was 1–1 after 90 minutes and extra time. Wellington Olympic won the penalty shoot-out 5–4.)	Auckland City	North Harbour Stadium	—
2025	Wellington Olympic	4–2	Auckland United	North Harbour Stadium	—
2026	Fencibles United	2–1	Cashmere Technical	Te Kaha	11,267

== Results by team ==
Teams shown in italics are no longer in existence.

Results by team
Club	Wins	First final won	Last final won	Runners-up	Last final lost	Total final appearances
University-Mount Wellington	7	1973	2003	5	1996	12
Christchurch United	7	1972	2023	3	1990	10
North Shore United	6	1952	1986	8	1995	12
Eastern Suburbs	6	1951	2015	4	2022	10
Central United	5	1997	2012	4	2017	9
Napier City Rovers	5	1985	2019	3	2015	8
Cashmere Technical (Note: Cashmere Technical's total includes one win under the earlier name of Christchurch Technical Old Boys.)	4	1948	2021	7	2026	11
Western	4	1936	1955	5	1966	9
Miramar Rangers	4	1966	2010	2	2021	6
Waterside	4	1938	1947	1	1948	5
Manurewa (Note: Manurewa's total includes one win under the earlier name of Tramways and one win under the name Tramurewa.)	4	1929	1984	0	—	4
Waitakere City	3	1994	1996	4	2016	7
Western Suburbs	3	1935	2006	3	2018	6
Wellington Olympic	3	2009	2025	1	1994	4
Petone	3	1928	1949	0	—	3
Northern	2	1959	1961	6	1962	8
Wellington Marist	2	1932	1946	1	1945	3
Ponsonby	2	1927	1933	0	—	2
Seatoun	2	1957	1958	0	—	2
Birkenhead United	2	2016	2018	0	—	2
Seacliff	1	1923		3	1929	4
Melville United (Note: Melville United's total includes one win under the earlier name of Hamilton Technical Old Boys.)	1	1962		3	2023	4
Bay Olympic (Note: Bay Olympic's total includes one win and one defeat under the earlier name of Blockhouse Bay.)	1	1970		2	2009	3
Dunedin Technical (Note: Dunedin Technical's total includes one defeat under the earlier name of King Edward TCOB.)	1	1999		2	2008	3
Wellington YMCA	1	1925		1	1923	2
Auckland Thistle	1	1934		1	1936	2
Nelson United	1	1977		1	1978	2
Dunedin City	1	1981		1	1980	2
Waikato United	1	1988		1	1992	2
Auckland City	1	2022		1	2024	2
Auckland Harbour Board	1	1924		0	—	1
Sunnyside	1	1926		0	—	1
Eden	1	1950		0	—	1
Onehunga-Mangere United	1	1954		0	—	1
Stop Out	1	1956		0	—	1
Mount Roskill	1	1964		0	—	1
East Coast Bays	1	2008		0	—	1
Wairarapa United	1	2011		0	—	1
Onehunga Sports	1	2017		0	—	1
Fencibles United	1	2026		0	—	1
Gisborne City	0	—		3	1987	3
Wellington United (Note: Wellington United's total includes and one defeat under the earlier name of Wellington City and one defeat under the name Wellington Diamond United.)	0	—		3	1991	3
Millerton All Blacks	0	—		2	1933	2
Mosgiel	0	—		2	1940	2
Nomads United	0	—		2	1963	2
Tauranga City (Note: Tauranga City's total includes and one defeat under the earlier name of Mount Maunganui and one defeat under the name Tauranga City United.)	0	—		2	2002	2
Christchurch Thistle	0	—		1	1934	1
Shamrock	0	—		1	1956	1
Saint Kilda	0	—		1	1965	1
New Brighton	0	—		1	1969	1
Rotorua City	0	—		1	1989	1
Christchurch Rangers	0	—		1	1993	1
Palmerston North Marist	0	—		1	2005	1
Lower Hutt City	0	—		1	2012	1
Auckland United	0	—		1	2025	1

== See also ==
- List of association football competitions
