= Chatham Cup =

New Zealand football tournament

- Organiser(s): New Zealand Football
- Founded: 1923; 103 years ago
- Region: New Zealand
- Teams: 122 (in 2025)
- Domestic cup: Charity Cup
- Current champions: Fencibles United (1st title)
- Most championships: University-Mount Wellington; Christchurch United (7 titles)
- Broadcaster: FIFA+ (select games)
- Website: nzfootball.co.nz/chatham-cup
- 2026 Chatham Cup

The Chatham Cup is New Zealand's premier knockout tournament in men's association football. It is held annually, with the final contested in September. The current champions of the Chatham Cup are Fencibles United, who defeated Cashmere Technical in the 2026 final.

== History ==
The Chatham Cup trophy

The Chatham Cup is contested by teams from throughout New Zealand, and has been held annually since 1923 with the exception of 1937, 1941–44 and 2020. Typically between 120 and 150 teams take part, with extra time and penalty shoot-outs used to decide matches which end in ties. In the past, replays were used, and in the early years of the competition the number of corners won during a game decided tied matches.

The cup itself was gifted to the then New Zealand Football Association by the crew of HMS Chatham as a token of appreciation for the hospitality they had encountered on a visit to New Zealand. The cup, which cost £150, was presented to NZFA President Sir Charles Skerrett by Captain Cecil Burnaby Prickett on board the Chatham on 14 December 1922. The actual trophy is modelled on the FA Cup.

The most successful teams in the Chatham Cup have been Christchurch United and Mount Wellington (seven wins, two of them since amalgamation with Auckland University); North Shore United has won six times. Most of the competition's winners have come from the main centres of Auckland, Wellington and Christchurch, though teams from Dunedin, Gisborne, Hamilton, Masterton, Nelson, and Napier have also won the competition, while the inaugural champions were from the small settlement of Seacliff, with many of the team being staff from the nearby psychiatric hospital.

The competition has been held every year since 1923 with six exceptions: the 1937 competition was cancelled due to a lack of entrants (only 12 teams applied to take part), four competitions (from 1941 to 1944) were cancelled due to World War II, and the 2020 competition was cancelled because of COVID-19.

=== The early years ===
Many of the early winners of the competition no longer exist, as competition was not effectively organised in New Zealand until the advent of a national league in 1970, and still remains largely amateur to this day. Many early New Zealand clubs have amalgamated with their neighbours or disbanded.

Prior to 1970, the final was held between the winners of separate North Island and South Island tournaments, with national semi-finals often being referred to as "Island finals".

In the early years of the competition, each regional association found its own champion to represent that region in the Chatham Cup, leading to confusion in many of the early records with regional finals, island finals, and the national final all often simply being referred to in contemporary reports as "finals". Further confusion is caused by the incomplete nature of many of the early competition records. It is only since the first publication of an annual New Zealand football yearbook in 1965 that any systematic record-keeping began to take place; earlier match reports and statistics are complete only inasmuch as the vagaries of newspaper sports reporting allowed.

Early Chatham Cup competitions were not well supported by the clubs, and the regulations surrounding entry to the competition were often financially prohibitive. The clubs themselves received only a tiny percentage of the money made in gate takings, and often had to travel considerably further to play matches than they did in the provincial leagues in which they competed. Concerns as to the costs involved and the limited financial support from the NZFA for entrants in the competition led to some teams disbanding as a result of the debts incurred, notably early winners Harbour Board. The competition itself was so poorly supported by clubs as a result that it barely survived its first few seasons: only 30 clubs entered each of the first few years of the competition, despite over 450 clubs being registered with the country's football administration in 1924; South Island participation in particular was poor, with only a handful of teams entering in the first few years, and the 1937 Cup was cancelled altogether due to only twelve teams nationwide having entered.

Despite this, large crowds often came to watch the matches, indicating their popularity with the public. The Wellington regional final in 1924 was played before a crowd of 1500 spectators, one in sixty of Wellington's population at the time, and the 1928 national final was watched by a crowd of 6000.

=== Post-war competition ===
Support for the competition among clubs has gained momentum since travel has become easier around the country and the financial regulation of the competition have been eased. Since World War II, it has been typical for 100 to 150 teams to enter the competition.

Since the 1960s, tournaments have been organised with a preliminary round and (occasionally) a qualifying round, four or five rounds proper, quarter-finals, semi-finals, and the final. Competition begins in April, and the final is normally played in September. Early rounds are held on a regional basis, between teams within the country's three competition regions (northern North Island, southern North Island, South Island). Different publications often list different numbers for the rounds, making for some confusion as to whether the round before the quarter-finals is the fourth or fifth round in any particular year.

Between 1970 and 2003, when a national league was run between the country's top clubs, national league teams received byes to later stages of the cup competition. The current New Zealand Football Championship, which replaced this league, is contested between franchise teams rather than traditional clubs: these franchise teams do not compete in the Chatham Cup. There is currently no formal system of byes to later rounds (as there is, for example, in the FA Cup); several top sides do, however, gain byes through to the second round.

From 1986 to 1988, the final was contested on a two-match home and away series, but in other years the final has been a single match. In 1952, the final finished 1–1, and the title was shared. A replay was used to decide the 1970, 1972 and 1983 finals, and penalty shoot-outs decided the 1990 and 2001 finals.

== Sponsorship ==
In 2025, Delivereasy was named as the naming partner for the Chatham Cup.

== Past winners ==
- 1923 – Seacliff (Otago)
- 1924 – Harbour Board (Auckland)
- 1925 – YMCA (Wellington)
- 1926 – Sunnyside (Christchurch)
- 1927 – Ponsonby
- 1928 – Petone
- 1929 – Tramways (Auckland)
- 1930 – Petone
- 1931 – Tramurewa (Auckland)
- 1932 – Wellington Marist
- 1933 – Ponsonby
- 1934 – Thistle (Auckland)
- 1935 – Hospital (Wellington)
- 1936 – Western (Christchurch)
- 1937 – competition cancelled due to lack of entries
- 1938 – Waterside (Wellington)
- 1939 – Waterside (Wellington)
- 1940 – Waterside (Wellington)
- 1941–44 – no competition due to World War II
- 1945 – Western (Christchurch)
- 1946 – Wellington Marist
- 1947 – Waterside (Wellington)
- 1948 – Christchurch Technical Old Boys
- 1949 – Petone
- 1950 – Eden (Auckland)
- 1951 – Eastern Suburbs (Auckland)
- 1952 – North Shore United and Western (Christchurch) (title shared)
- 1953 – Eastern Suburbs (Auckland)
- 1954 – Onehunga
- 1955 – Western (Christchurch)
- 1956 – Stop Out (Wellington)
- 1957 – Seatoun
- 1958 – Seatoun
- 1959 – Northern (Dunedin)
- 1960 – North Shore United
- 1961 – Northern (Dunedin)
- 1962 – Hamilton Technical Old Boys
- 1963 – North Shore United
- 1964 – Mount Roskill
- 1965 – Eastern Suburbs (Auckland)
- 1966 – Miramar Rangers
- 1967 – North Shore United
- 1968 – Eastern Suburbs (Auckland)
- 1969 – Eastern Suburbs (Auckland)
- 1970 – Blockhouse Bay
- 1971 – Western Suburbs (Wellington)
- 1972 – Christchurch United
- 1973 – Mount Wellington (Auckland)
- 1974 – Christchurch United
- 1975 – Christchurch United
- 1976 – Christchurch United
- 1977 – Nelson United
- 1978 – Manurewa
- 1979 – North Shore United
- 1980 – Mount Wellington (Auckland)
- 1981 – Dunedin City
- 1982 – Mount Wellington (Auckland)
- 1983 – Mount Wellington (Auckland)
- 1984 – Manurewa
- 1985 – Napier City Rovers
- 1986 – North Shore United
- 1987 – Gisborne City
- 1988 – Waikato United
- 1989 – Christchurch United
- 1990 – Mount Wellington (Auckland)
- 1991 – Christchurch United
- 1992 – Miramar Rangers
- 1993 – Napier City Rovers
- 1994 – Waitakere City
- 1995 – Waitakere City
- 1996 – Waitakere City
- 1997 – Central United (Auckland)
- 1998 – Central United (Auckland)
- 1999 – Dunedin Technical
- 2000 – Napier City Rovers
- 2001 – University-Mount Wellington (Auckland)
- 2002 – Napier City Rovers
- 2003 – University-Mount Wellington (Auckland)
- 2004 – Miramar Rangers
- 2005 – Central United (Auckland)
- 2006 – Western Suburbs (Wellington)
- 2007 – Central United (Auckland)
- 2008 – East Coast Bays
- 2009 – Wellington Olympic
- 2010 – Miramar Rangers
- 2011 – Wairarapa United (Masterton)
- 2012 – Central United
- 2013 – Cashmere Technical (Christchurch)
- 2014 – Cashmere Technical (Christchurch)
- 2015 – Eastern Suburbs
- 2016 – Birkenhead United (Auckland)
- 2017 – Onehunga Sports (Auckland)
- 2018 – Birkenhead United (Auckland)
- 2019 – Napier City Rovers
- 2020 – competition cancelled due to COVID-19
- 2021 – Cashmere Technical (Christchurch)
- 2022 – Auckland City
- 2023 – Christchurch United
- 2024 – Wellington Olympic
- 2025 – Wellington Olympic
- 2026 – Fencibles United

=== Bob Smith Memorial Trophy ===
The Bob Smith Memorial Trophy is traditionally awarded to the runners-up in the Chatham Cup, though this has not always been the case, notably in the years 1982 to 1997, when the trophy's location was unknown. Details of each year's runners-up can be found in the individual articles on each year's competition.

=== Jack Batty Memorial Cup ===
A Jack Batty Memorial Cup is presented annually to the player adjudged to have made the most positive impact in the Chatham Cup final. The trophy honours Jack Batty, who was both a member of the crew of HMS Chatham and also a three-time medallist in the early days of the tournament with Auckland Harbour Board, Tramways, and Tramurewa. The cup was donated by his son, John Batty, himself a Chatham Cup winner with Blockhouse Bay in 1970, and was first awarded to Greg Brown of Napier City Rovers in 1985.

- 1985 – Greg Brown (Napier City Rovers)
- 1986 – Duncan Cole (North Shore United)
- 1987 – Dave Reynolds (Gisborne City)
- 1988 – Steve Tate (Waikato United)
- 1989 – Michael McGarry (Christchurch United)
- 1990 – Michael McGarry (Christchurch United)
- 1991 – Dave Woodard (Wellington United)
- 1992 – Neal Cave (Miramar Rangers)
- 1993 – Paul Halford (Napier City Rovers)
- 1994 – Ivan Vicelich (Waitakere City)
- 1995 – Darren McClennan (Waitakere City)
- 1996 – Mark Foy (Mount Wellington)
- 1997 – Ivan Vicelich (Central United)
- 1998 – Terry Torrens (Central United)
- 1999 – Aaron Burgess (Dunedin Technical)
- 2000 – Jimmy Cudd (Napier City Rovers)
- 2001 – Paul Bunbury (University-Mount Wellington)
- 2002 – Leon Birnie (Napier City Rovers)
- 2003 – Kara Waetford (University-Mount Wellington)
- 2004 – Tim Butterfield (Miramar Rangers)
- 2005 – Ross Nicholson (Central United)
- 2006 – Phil Imray (Western Suburbs)
- 2007 – Luiz del Monte (Central United)
- 2008 – Ryan Zoghby (East Coast Bays)
- 2009 – Raf de Gregorio (Wellington Olympic)
- 2010 – Phil Imray (Miramar Rangers)
- 2011 – Scott Robson (Wairarapa United)
- 2012 – Emiliano Tade (Central United)
- 2013 – Andy Pitman (Cashmere Technical)
- 2014 – Stuart Kelly (Cashmere Technical)
- 2015 – Miles John (Napier City Rovers)
- 2016 – Tom Davis (Birkenhead United)
- 2017 – Mario Ilich (Central United)
- 2018 – Alec Solomons (Birkenhead United)
- 2019 – Sho Goto (Napier City Rovers)
- 2020 – Not Awarded
- 2021 – Yuya Taguchi (Cashmere Technical)
- 2022 – Dylan Manickum (Auckland City)
- 2023 – Max Tommy (Melville United)
- 2024 – Stipe Ukich (Auckland City)
- 2025 – Isa Prins (Wellington Olympic)
- 2026 – Yoichi Kawachi (Fencibles United)

== Cup records ==
=== Most cup wins ===
Wins	Club	Years	Notes
7	University-Mount Wellington	1973, 1980, 1982, 1983, 1990, 2001, 2003	First five wins as Mount Wellington
7	Christchurch United	1972, 1974, 1975, 1976, 1989, 1991, 2023	
6	North Shore United	1952, 1960, 1963, 1967, 1979, 1986	Title shared in 1952
6	Eastern Suburbs	1951, 1953, 1965, 1968, 1969, 2015	
5	Central United	1997, 1998, 2005, 2007, 2012	
5	Napier City Rovers	1985, 1993, 2000, 2002, 2019	
4	Waterside	1938, 1939, 1940, 1947	
4	Western	1936, 1945, 1952, 1955	Title shared in 1952
4	Manurewa AFC	1929, 1931, 1978, 1984	First as Tramways in 1929, then Tramurewa in 1931
4	Miramar Rangers	1966, 1992, 2004, 2010	
4	Cashmere Technical	1948, 2013, 2014, 2021	First win as Christchurch Technical
3	Petone	1928, 1930, 1949	
3	Waitakere City	1994, 1995, 1996	
3	Western Suburbs	1935, 1971, 2006	First win as Hospital AFC
3	Wellington Olympic	2009, 2024, 2025	

=== Most appearances in final ===
Finals	Wins	Club	Most recent appearance	Notes
12	7	University-Mount Wellington	2003*	first 10 appearances as Mount Wellington
12	6	North Shore United	1995	
11	4	Cashmere Technical	2026	first six appearances (including one win) as Technical Old Boys, seventh appearance as Christchurch Technical.
10	7	Christchurch United	2023*	
10	6	Eastern Suburbs	2022	
9	5	Central United	2017	
9	4	Western	1966	
8	5	Napier City Rovers	2019*	
8	2	Northern	1962	
7	3	Waitakere City	2016	

NOTE: An asterisk in the "most recent appearance" column indicates that the team won the Chatham Cup in the year indicated

=== Other records ===
- Highest team score (final): 7:
  - Seatoun 7–1 Christchurch City (Note: Succeeded by Christchurch United) (1958)
  - Christchurch United 7–1 Rotorua City (1989)
- Highest team score (any match): 21:
  - Metro 21–0 Norwest United (Third Round, 1998)
  - Central United 21–0 Norwest United (second round, 2005)
- Most goals in a final: 8:
  - Waterside (Wellington) 6–2 Mosgiel (1940)
  - Western 6–2 Eastern Suburbs (1955)
  - Seatoun 7–1 Christchurch City (1958)
  - North Shore United 5–3 Technical Old Boys (1960)
  - Christchurch United 4–4 (a.e.t) Mount Wellington (1972)*
  - Christchurch United 7–1 Rotorua City (1989)
- Most winners medals: 6: Steve Sumner
- Most final appearances: 8:
  - Tony Sibley
  - Ron Armstrong
- Most individual goals in a final: 6: John Donovan for Seatoun, 1958
- Most teams entered: 174 (1991)
- Youngest goalkeeper to start a match:
  - Callum Roberson - 15 Years & 293 Days. (Matamata Swifts v Central United - Kiwitea Street, 25 April 2022)

* Does not include two-legged finals. The 1972 match referred to is the first match, which finished 4–4.

== Media coverage ==
In September 2023, New Zealand signed a deal to have select Chatham Cup games streamed for free on FIFA+ worldwide.
