= 1993 Chatham Cup =

Tournament details
- Venue(s): McLean Park, Napier
- Dates: , 1993

Final positions
- Champions: Napier City Rovers (2nd title)
- Runners-up: Christchurch Rangers

The 1993 Chatham Cup was the 66th annual nationwide knockout football competition in New Zealand.

Up to the last 16 of the competition, the cup was run in three regions (northern, central, and southern), with an open draw from the quarter-finals on. National League teams received a bye until the third round (last 64). In all, 153 teams took part in the competition, which consisted of a preliminary round, five rounds proper, quarter-finals, semi-finals, and a final.

== The 1993 final ==
Napier City Rovers won the league/cup double.

== Results ==
=== Third round ===
Christchurch Rangers	2 – 0	New Brighton

Christchurch United	2 – 2 (aet)*	Cashmere Wanderers

Dunedin Technical	3 – 1	Burnside United (Christchurch)

East Coast Bays	1 – 5	Ngaruawahia United

Eden	2 – 0	Northland United (Whangarei)

Green Island	3 – 0	Riccarton

Invercargill Thistle	4 – 2	Mosgiel

Island Bay United	1 – 2	Brooklyn Northern United

Kaiapoi Town	0 – 4	Christchurch Technical

Miramar Rangers	2 – 0	Petone

Mount Maunganui	2 – 0	Mount Albert-Ponsonby

Mount Wellington	1 – 2	Oratia United

Napier City Rovers	7 – 2	Lower Hutt City

New Plymouth OB	2 – 3	Wanganui East Athletic

North Shore United	5 – 0	Melville (Hamilton)

Onerahi	0 – 3	Waikato United (Hamilton)

Pakuranga Town	5 – 0	South Auckland Rangers

Papatoetoe	2 – 4	Taupo

Paraparaumu United	0 – 6	North Wellington

Raumati Hearts	4 – 0	Wellington Marist

Red Sox (Palmerston North)	3 – 3 (aet)*	Taradale

Seatoun	1 – 3	Nelson United

Shamrock (Christchurch)	1 – 5	Roslyn-Wakari

Tawa	4 – 2	Wainuiomata

Tokoroa	0 – 6	Kawerau Town

Waikato Unicol (Hamilton)	2 – 4	Manurewa

Waitakere City	3 – 0	Central (Auckland)

Waterside Karori	0 – 1	Stop Out (Lower Hutt)

Wellington United	3 – 2	Western Suburbs FC (Porirua)

Western (Christchurch)	1 – 4	Halswell United

Western Rangers (Hastings)	0 – 3	Wellington Olympic

Western Springs	3 – 1	Mount Roskill

* Won on penalties by Cashmere (5-4) and Red Sox (4-2)

=== Fourth round ===
Brooklyn Northern United	0 – 6	Wellington United

Christchurch Rangers	5 – 0	Green Island

Christchurch Technical	5 – 1	Cashmere Wanderers

Eden	3 – 0	Kawerau Town

Halswell United	1 – 0	Invercargill Thistle

Manurewa	0 – 0 (aet)*	Mount Maunganui

Miramar Rangers	1 – 2	Napier City Rovers

North Shore United	5 – 1	Taupo

Oratia United	1 – 3	Waitakere City

Pakuranga Town	2 – 1	Waikato United

Raumati Hearts	1 – 0	North Wellington

Red Sox	1 – 0	Tawa

Roslyn-Wakari	5 – 0	Dunedin Technical

Stop Out	1 – 2	Nelson United

Wellington Olympic	1 – 0	Wanganui East Athletic

Western Springs	0 – 6	Ngaruawahia United

* Won on penalties by Manurewa (6-5)

=== Fifth round ===
Christchurch Technical	0 – 2	Christchurch Rangers

Eden	0 – 4	Napier City Rovers

Nelson United	3 – 2	Raumati Hearts

Ngaruawahia United	0 – 5	Waitakere City

Pakuranga Town	3 – 4	North Shore United

Red Sox	0 – 2	Manurewa

Roslyn-Wakari	2 – 3	Wellington Olympic

Wellington United	3 – 1	Halswell United

=== Quarter-finals ===
Christchurch Rangers	3 – 2	Nelson United

North Shore United	1 – 0	Manurewa

Wellington Olympic	0 – 2	Napier City Rovers

Wellington United	3 – 2	Waitakere City

=== Semi-finals ===
Christchurch Rangers	1 – 0	North Shore United

Napier City Rovers	6 – 2	Wellington United

=== Final ===
Napier City Rovers	6 – 0	Christchurch Rangers

McLean Park, Napier
