= 1991 Chatham Cup =

Tournament details
- Venue(s): Basin Reserve, Wellington
- Dates: , 1991

Final positions
- Champions: Christchurch United (6th title)
- Runners-up: Wellington United

The 1991 Chatham Cup was the 64th annual nationwide knockout football competition in New Zealand.

Up to the last 16 of the competition, the cup was run in three regions (northern, central, and southern), with an open draw from the quarter-finals on. National League teams received a bye until the third round (last 64). In all, a record 174 teams took part in the competition.

Tawa reached the final 16 by unusual means. They were defeated by New Plymouth Old Boys in the third round, but New Plymouth Old Boys were disqualified after the draw for the final 32 was made, which would have seen them playing against Rongotai College. Tawa were reinstated as winners of the third round match, but Rongotai refused to play against them, claiming that they should have been awarded the match against NPOB by default. Tawa were thus deemed to have won the fourth-round game by a walkover.

== The 1991 final ==
The league/cup double was completed for the fifth time, with Christchurch United becoming the second club to achieve the feat twice, having previously won the double in 1975. This was the last occasion that the double was won with the old New Zealand National Soccer League, as this was disbanded at the end of the 1992 season.

== Results ==
=== Third Round ===
Balclutha	0 – 9	Green Island

Blockhouse Bay	3 – 0	Kawerau Town

Burndale United (Christchurch)	4 – 0	Rangers (Christchurch)

Caversham	3 – 1	Waihopai (Invercargill)

Central (Auckland)	1 – 5	North Shore United

Christchurch Technical	2 – 0	Kaiapoi Town

Dunedin City	1 – 0	Halswell United

Manukau City	2 – 0	Lynndale (Auckland)

Massey University	5 – 0	Wellington Marist

Miramar Rangers	8 – 0	Taradale

Mount Maunganui	3 – 1	Mount Albert-Ponsonby

Mount Wellington	3 – 0	Hamilton Wanderers

Napier City Rovers	4 – 0	Porirua Viard United

Nelson United	2 – 0	Lower Hutt City

New Plymouth United	3 – 6	Manawatu

Ngongotaha	2 – 2 (aet)*	Pakuranga Town

North Wellington	2 – 2*	Stop Out (Lower Hutt)

Onehunga Sports	0 – 3	Manurewa

Oratia United	2 – 3	Waitakere City

Otago University	0 – 4	Christchurch United

Papakura City	5 – 2	Northland United (Whangarei)

Petone	2 – 0	Gisborne City

Rongotai College (Wellington)	3 – 2	St. Patrick's College (Wellington)

Rotorua Suburbs	1 – 2	Massey

Seatoun	6 – 4	Wellington Olympic

Shamrock (Christchurch)	1 – 2	Northern (Dunedin)

Tawa	1 – 2†	New Plymouth Old Boys

Waikato Unicol (Hamilton)	1 – 2	Eden (Auckland)

Waikato United (Hamilton)	6 – 0	Ellerslie

Waterside Karori	1 – 1*	Hutt Valley United

Wellington United	1 – 0	Wainuiomata

Woolston W.M.C.	3 – 0	Dunedin Technical

* Won on penalties by Ngongotaha (6-5), Stop Out (4-1), and Waterside (5-3)
† New Plymouth OB disqualified for rule infringement

=== Fourth Round ===
Christchurch Technical	4 – 1	Caversham

Christchurch United	2 – 0	Northern

Dunedin City	0 – 2	Green Island

Manurewa	2 – 0	Manukau City

Massey	0 – 3	Waitakere City

Mount Wellington	6 – 1	Eden

Napier City Rovers	2 – 1	Miramar Rangers

Tawa	w/o	Rongotai College

Ngongotaha	0 – 4	Mount Maunganui

North Shore United	4 – 3	Papakura City

Petone	2 – 1	Manawatu

Seatoun	2 – 0	Massey University

Waikato United	7 – 0	Blockhouse Bay

Waterside Karori	0 – 0 (aet)*	Stop Out

Wellington United	2 – 0	Nelson United

Woolston W.M.C.	2 – 1	Burndale United

* Won on penalties by Stop Out (8-7)

=== Fifth Round ===
Christchurch Technical	1 – 2	Christchurch United

Green Island	1 – 0	Woolston W.M.C.

Manurewa	1 – 2	Waitakere City

Mount Maunganui	3 – 0	Waikato United

Mount Wellington	2 – 4	North Shore United

Napier City Rovers	9 – 0	Tawa

Petone	1 – 3	Wellington United

Seatoun	0 – 2	Stop Out

=== Sixth Round ===
Green Island FC	0 – 3	Christchurch United

Napier City Rovers	3 – 1	Waitakere City

North Shore United	1 – 2	Mount Maunganui

Stop Out	1 – 1 (aet)*	Wellington United

* Won on penalties by Wellington United (5-4)

=== Semi-finals ===
Christchurch United	2 – 1	Napier City Rovers

Mount Maunganui	0 – 2	Wellington United

=== Final ===
Christchurch United	2 – 1	Wellington United
Evans ×2		Fullen (o.g.)

Basin Reserve, Wellington
