= 1992 Chatham Cup =

Tournament details
- Venue(s): Basin Reserve, Wellington
- Dates: 27 September 1992

Final positions
- Champions: Miramar Rangers (2nd title)
- Runners-up: Waikato United

Awards
- Jack Batty Memorial Cup: Neal Cave (Miramar Rangers)

The 1992 Chatham Cup was the 65th annual nationwide knockout football competition in New Zealand.

Up to the last 16 of the competition, the cup was run in three regions (northern, central, and southern), with an open draw from the quarter-finals on. National League teams received a bye until the third round (last 64). In all, 141 teams took part in the competition.

== The 1992 final ==
In the final, Darren Fellows put Waikato United into the lead early on, but Miramar Rangers fought back with goal before half time to Billy Wright. Wright added a second via a penalty in the second half, followed by a late goal from Vaughan Coveny.

The Jack Batty Memorial Cup is awarded to the player adjudged to have made to most positive impact in the Chatham Cup final. The winner of the 1992 Jack Batty Memorial Cup was Neal Cave of Miramar Rangers.

== Results ==
=== Third Round ===
Ashburton	1 – 7	Christchurch Technical

Birkenhead United	1 – 3	Eden (Auckland)

Central (Auckland)	2 – 1	South Auckland Rangers

Christchurch Rangers	5 – 2	Halswell United

Christchurch United	w/o	Shamrock (Christchurch)

Ellerslie	6 – 1	Kawerau Town

Green Island	0 – 1	Dunedin Technical

Island Bay United	2 – 1	Paraparaumu United

Mount Albert-Ponsonby	2 – 1	Mount Maunganui

Mount Roskill	0 – 0 (aet)*	Papatoetoe

Mount Wellington	8 – 0	Claudelands Rovers

New Plymouth Old Boys	0 – 2	Hutt Valley United

New Plymouth United	0 – 1	Wanganui East Athletic

Northland United (Whangarei)	0 – 3	Lynndale (Auckland)

North Shore United	3 – 1	Onehunga Sports

North Wellington	0 – 5	Napier City Rovers

Pakuranga Town	3 – 2	Eastern Suburbs (Auckland)

Petone	3 – 1	Manawatu (Palmerston North)

Porirua City	0 – 5	Red Sox (Palmerston North)

Queens Park (Invercargill)	3 – 4	Caversham

Roslyn-Wakari	7 – 2	Mosgiel

Rotorua City	0 – 0 (aet)*	Manurewa

Seatoun	2 – 3	Waterside Karori

Stop Out (Lower Hutt)	1 – 3	Miramar Rangers

Takaro	2 – 1	Tararua United (Upper Hutt)

Tawa	3 – 1	Wellington Olympic

University (Auckland)	1 – 3	Waikato United (Hamilton)

Wainouiomata	2 – 5	Wellington United

Waitakere City	5 – 1	Blockhouse Bay

Western (Christchurch)	2 – 2 (Aet)*	Nomads United (Christchurch)

Woodleigh Cosmos (New Plymouth)	1 – 3	Western Suburbs FC (Porirua)

Woolston WMC	0 – 1	Burndale United (Christchurch)

* Won on penalties by Mt. Roskill (4–3), Manurewa (7–6), and Western (6–5)

=== Fourth Round ===
Burndale United	1 – 1 (aet)*	Christchurch United

Caversham	1 – 3	Western

Central	1 – 2	North Shore United

Christchurch Rangers	0 – 2	Christchurch Technical

Dunedin Technical	1 – 0	Roslyn-Wakari

Eden	1 – 4	Mount Albert-Ponsonby

Manurewa	0 – 3	Mount Wellington

Mount Roskill	2 – 3	Ellerslie

Napier City Rovers	0 – 1	Tawa

Pakuranga Town	4 – 3	Lynndale

Petone	0 – 4	Hutt Valley United

Takaro	0 – 4	Miramar Rangers

Waitakere City	0 – 1	Waikato United

Waterside Karori	3 – 3 (aet)*	Red Sox

Wellington United	2 – 1	Island Bay United

Western Suburbs FC	2 – 2 (aet)*	Wanganui East Athletic

* Won on penalties by Christchurch United (4–2), Red Sox (4–2), and Western Suburbs (8–7)

=== Fifth Round ===
Christchurch Technical	2 – 4	Christchurch United

Dunedin Technical	1 – 4	Western (Christchurch)

Ellerslie	1 – 2	Waikato United (Hamilton)

Miramar Rangers	4 – 1	Western Suburbs FC (Porirua)

Mount Albert-Ponsonby	3 – 2	Pakuranga Town

14 June

North Shore United	3 – 3 (aet)*	Mount Wellington
Stevens, Lawler 2 (1 pen.)		Worsley, Elrick, Witteveen (pen.)

Allen Hill Stadium, North Shore
Referee: N. Fox

Red Sox	1 – 5	Tawa (soccer)

Wellington United	1 – 2	Hutt Valley United

* North Shore United won 4–3 on penalties.

=== Sixth Round ===
Hutt Valley United	2 – 5	Miramar Rangers

Mount Albert-Ponsonby	1 – 1(aet)*	North Shore United

Tawa	2 – 1	Western

Waikato United	3 – 1	Christchurch United

* North Shore United won 5–4 on penalties.

=== Semi-finals ===
Miramar Rangers	2 – 0	North Shore United

Tawa	0 – 2	Waikato United

=== Final ===
27 Sept. 1992

Miramar Rangers	3 – 1	Waikato United
Wright 2 (1 pen.), Coveny		Fellows

Basin Reserve, Wellington
Referee: A. McGregor
