= 2025 Chatham Cup final =

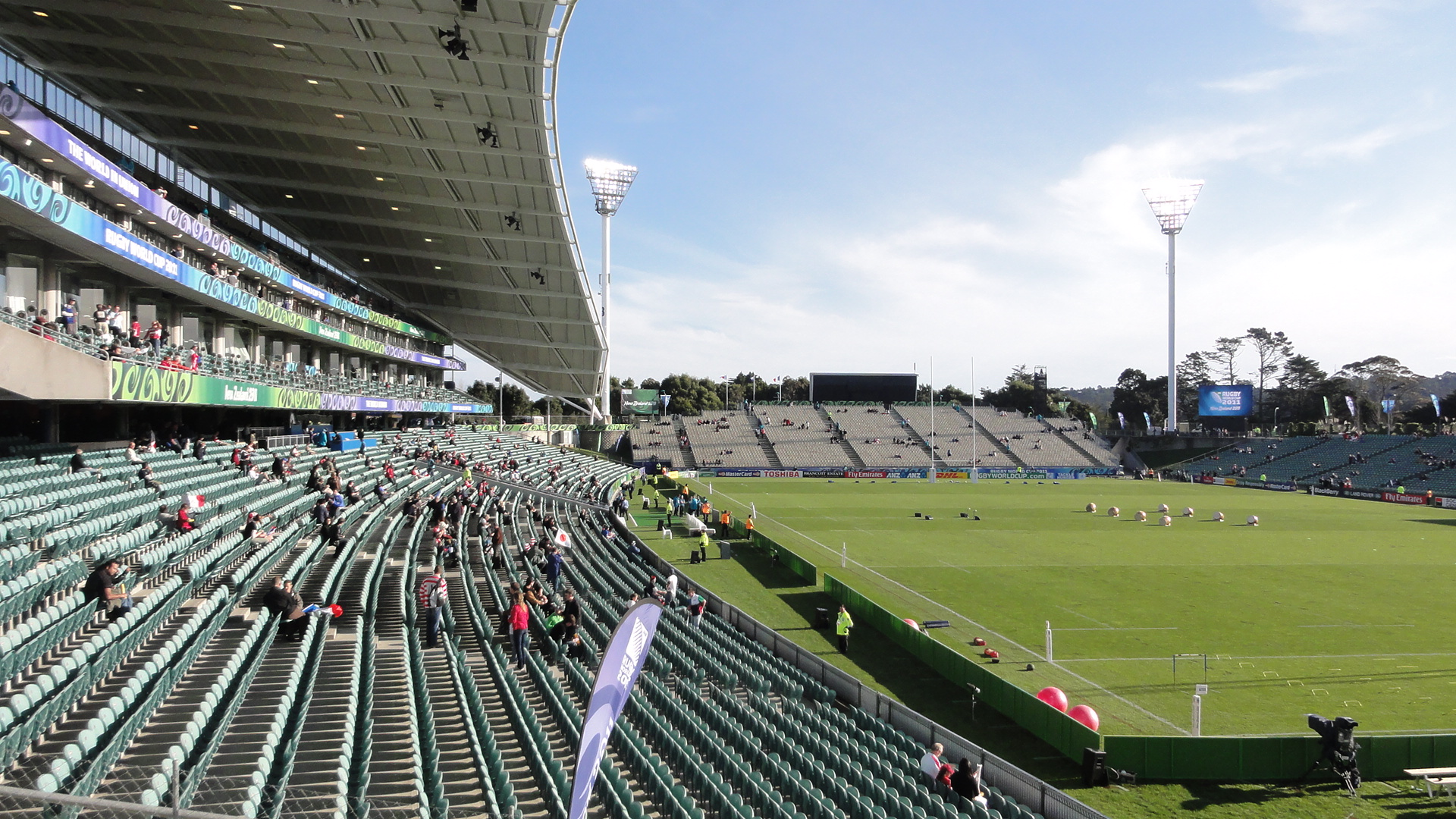
- The match took place at North Harbour Stadium.
- Event: 2025 Chatham Cup
Auckland United	Wellington Olympic
2	4
- Date: 7 September 2025
- Venue: North Harbour Stadium, Auckland
- Jack Batty Cup: Isa Prins
- Referee: Cory Mills
- Weather: Mostly cloudy / Windy; 15 °C (59 °F); 55% humidity

The 2025 Chatham Cup final was a football match played at North Harbour Stadium in Auckland, New Zealand, on 7 September 2025 to determine the winners of the 2025 Chatham Cup. It was the 97th final of New Zealand football's primary cup competition, the Chatham Cup.

The final was contested between defending champions Wellington Olympic and fellow National League side Auckland United. This was the first time these two sides have met in the final.

== Route to the final ==
=== Auckland United ===
Auckland City's route to the final
Round	Opposition	Score
2	Taupo (A)	5–0
3	Northland (A)	3–0
4	Melville United (H)	7–1
QF	Christchurch United (A)	4–2 (a.e.t.)
SF	Nelson Suburbs (H)	3–0
Key: (H) = Home venue; (A) = Away venue

This is Auckland United's first final.

Auckland United entered the tournament in round 2, as a Northern League team. They began with a 5–0 home victory over Taupo at Crown Park. Ishveer Singh and Matias Nunez both grabbed braces, while Shaan Anand completed the scoring. They then defeated Northland away in round 3 in a 3–0 victory, thanks to an Emiliano Tade hat-trick. In round 4, they beat Melville United 7–1 at home. Daniel Atkinson picked up a hat-trick this time with Bruce Izumi and Ishveer Singh also scoring before and Daniel Olaoye brace sealed the win.

In the quarter-final match, Auckland United faced Christchurch United at United Sports Centre in Christchurch, where they came out with an after extra time win. Matthew Conroy and Emilano Tade both scored inside the last 10 minutes to send the game to extra time. Tade found the net again in extra-time before Ishveer Singh confirmed United's progression to the semi finals.

In the semi-final match, held at Keith Hay Park, Auckland United defeated Southern League side Nelson Suburbs 3–0, to qualify for their first Chatham Cup final. Daniel Olaoye, Matthew Conroy and Emiliano Tade all scored in the first half to ensure United progressed to their first ever Chatham Cup final.

=== Wellington Olympic ===
Wellington Olympic's route to the final
Round	Opposition	Score
2	Petone (A)	3–0
3	Waterside Karori (A)	3–0
4	Napier City Rovers (A)	3–2
QF	Western Suburbs (A)	3–2 (a.e.t.)
SF	Eastern Suburbs (A)	1–1 (a.e.t.) (4–3 p)
Key: (H) = Home venue; (A) = Away venue

This is Olympic's fourth final. The club previously lost in 1994 and won in 2009 and 2024.

As a Central League team, Wellington Olympic also entered the tournament in round 2. They began their campaign with a 3–0 away win over fellow Central League side Petone. Hamish Watson grabbed a brace, while Isa Prins also bagged a goal. They next recorded a 3–0 away win over Waterside Karori at the same ground with two goals Jack-Henry Sinclair, while Ben Mata opened the scoring. In round 4, Olympic travelled to Napier City Rovers and recorded 3–2 win. Isa Prins, Jack-Henry Sinclair and Hamish Watson all scored again to help Olympic progress to the quarter-finals.

In the quarter-finals, Olympic defeated Western Suburbs 3–2 after extra time. Gavin Hoy opened the scoring just before half-time, with Gianni Bouzoukis doubling their lead in the last 15 minutes. With eight minutes remaining, Freeman grabbed one back for Suburbs, before Finn Diamond found an equaliser in the third minute of stoppage time. After 110 minutes, A Davies finally found the winner for Olympic.

In the semi-final match, held at Eastern Suburbs' Madills Farm in Auckland, Olympic won 4–3 on penalties after a 1–1 draw. Jake Mechell gave Suburbs the lead on half an hour, before a second half penalty from Isa Prins sent the game to extra-time. With scores remaining level for the extra 30 minutes, the game progressed to penalties. Noah Karunaratne had his penalty saved by Scott Basalaj, meaning Olympic would play in back-to-back finals.

== Pre-match ==
New Zealand Football confirmed that the 2025 final would begin at 13:00.

=== Broadcasting ===
The final was shown live and free on FIFA+.

== Match ==
=== Details ===
7 September 2025
13:00

Auckland United	2–4	Wellington Olympic
Vollenhoven 17'; Curry 73'	Report	Watson 4', 68'; Prins 34'; Sinclair 59'

North Harbour Stadium, Albany
Referee: Cory Mills

Auckland United	Wellington Olympic

GK	22	(New Zealand) Joel Paterson
RB	23	(New Zealand) Daniel Atkinson		(substituted off) 75'
CB	6	(New Zealand) Abdallah Khaled	(yellow card) 62'	(substituted off) 66'
CB	4	(New Zealand) Ross Haviland (c)
LB	5	(New Zealand) Boyd Curry
RM	6	(South Africa) Dré Vollenhoven
CM	25	(Japan) Hideto Takahashi
CM	12	(New Zealand) Will Mendoza
LM	10	(New Zealand) Oliver Fay		(substituted off) 60'
CF	19	(New Zealand) Otto Ingham
CF	20	(Argentina) Emiliano Tade
Substitutes:
GK	1	(Northern Ireland) Kai McLean
DF	14	(New Zealand) Oliver Campbell
MF	7	(New Zealand) Bruce Izumi		(substituted on) 66'
MF	13	(New Zealand) Riley Manuel
FW	11	(New Zealand) Matthew Conroy		(substituted on) 60'
FW	17	(New Zealand) Matias Nunez		(substituted on) 75'
FW	18	(New Zealand) Shaan Anand
Manager:
(England) Jose Figueira

GK	1	(New Zealand) Scott Basalaj (c)
CB	4	(Cyprus) Alexander Solomon		(substituted off) 78'
CB	13	(New Zealand) William Vincent
CB	3	(New Zealand) Adam Supyk
RM	14	(New Zealand) Jack-Henry Sinclair		(substituted off) 78'
CM	16	(New Zealand) Tiahn Manuel
CM	10	(Canada) Gavin Hoy		(substituted off) 69'
CM	6	(New Zealand) Tor Davenport Petersen
LM	20	(New Zealand) Noah Boyce
CF	9	(New Zealand) Hamish Watson
CF	7	(New Zealand) Isa Prins		(substituted off) 90+3'
Substitutes:
GK	21	(New Zealand) Oscar Boyce
DF	5	(New Zealand) Justin Gulley
DF	15	(Cook Islands) Ben Mata
MF	17	(United States) John Reynolds		(substituted on) 78'
MF	18	(England) Joel Auty		(substituted on) 90+3'
FW	8	(New Zealand) Jonty Roubos		(substituted on) 78'
FW	19	(New Zealand) Gianni Bouzoukis	(yellow card) 87'	(substituted on) 69'
Manager:
(Barbados) Paul Ifill

Man of the Match:
Isa Prins (Wellington Olympic)

Assistant referees:
Isaac Trevis
Michael Love
Fourth official:
Campbell-Kirk Kawana-Waugh

Match rules

- 90 minutes
- 30 minutes of extra time if necessary
- Penalty shoot-out if scores still level
- Seven named substitutes
- Maximum of five substitutions, with a sixth allowed in extra time (Note: Each team was given only three opportunities to make substitutions, with a fourth opportunity in extra time, excluding substitutions made at half-time, before the start of extra time and at half-time in extra time.)

=== Statistics ===
Overall
Statistic	Auckland United	Wellington Olympic
Goals scored	2	4
Ball possession	55%	45%
Corner kicks	4	6
Fouls committed	12	8
Offsides	2	2
Yellow cards	1	1
Red cards	0	0

== Post-match ==
With his team's victory, Paul Ifill won three Chatham Cup's in a row, after winning on penalties with Christchurch United in 2023.
