= 1951 Chatham Cup =

Tournament details
- Venue(s): Basin Reserve, Wellington
- Dates: 8 September 1951

Final positions
- Champions: Eastern Suburbs (1st title)
- Runners-up: Northern

The 1951 Chatham Cup was the 24th annual nationwide knockout football competition in New Zealand.

The competition was run on a regional basis, with regional associations each holding separate qualifying rounds.

Teams taking part in the final rounds are known to have included Eastern Suburbs (Auckland), Huntly Thistle, New Plymouth Old Boys, Napier High School Old Boys, Wanganui Old Boys, St. Andrews (Manawatu), Petone, Woodbourne (Marlborough), Riccarton, Northern (Dunedin), and Invercargill Thistle.

== The 1951 final ==
Eastern Suburbs' Reg King became the sixth player – and the first since 1945 – to score a hat-trick in a Chatham Cup final. Eastern Suburbs' John Jakens set an unusual record, gaining his third consecutive winners medal, gaining those medals playing for three different teams (he had previously won with Petone in 1949 and Eden in 1950). The first half of the final was even with Northern having the better of the opening minutes and gaining the lead through Trevor McFarlane. Tony Frogley levelled the scores before the break. The second half was entirely Eastern Suburbs', despite playing much of it with ten men after Frogley left the field injured (this was in the days before substitutes were allowed). Centre-forward King put the Aucklanders ahead, and the lead was soon doubled by Jack Anderson. King scored twice more late on to complete an emphatic win. Mr. A. Aspen of Wellington became only the third referee to officiate at more than one final, having previously controlled the 1948 final.

== Results ==
=== Quarter-Finals ===
South Island Semi-Final
28 July 1951

| Invercargill Thistle | 1–5 | Northern |

Invercargill Showgrounds, Invercargill
South Island Semi-Final
4 August 1951

| Christchurch Thistle | 7–0 | Millerton Thistle |

English Park, Christchurch
North Island Semi-Final
4 August 1951

| Petone | 8–0 | Wanganui Technical Old Boys |

Basin Reserve, Wellington
North Island Semi-Final
28 July 1951

| Eastern Suburbs | 6–1 | Huntly Thistle |

Blandford Park, Auckland

=== Semi-Finals ===
North Island Final
15 August 1951

| Eastern Suburbs | 8–0 | Petone |

Blandford Park, Auckland
South Island Final
15 August 1951

| Northern | 5–2 | Christchurch Thistle |

Caledonian Park, Dunedin

=== Final ===
8 September 1951

| Eastern Suburbs | 5–1 | Northern |
|---|---|---|
| King 3, Frogley, Anderson | | McFarlane |

Basin Reserve, Wellington
Referee: A. Aspen
