= Benge (disambiguation) =

Benge may refer to:

- Benge, an African tribal ritual
- Benge, Democratic Republic of the Congo, a village in Bas-Uele Province
- Benge dialect of the Bwa language
- Benge, Washington, an unincorporated community in Adams County, Washington, USA
- Benge (musician), pseudonym of Ben Edwards, British musician and producer
- Benge (surname), a list of people with the surname Benge
