= Edward Barton =

Edward Barton may refer to:

- Edward Barton (diplomat) (1562–1598), English ambassador to the Ottoman Empire
- Edward Gustavus Campbell Barton (1857–1942), electrical engineer, early wireless experimenter and Queensland politician
- Edward Barton (musician) (born 1958), English poet, artist and musician
- Edward Barton (priest) (1768–1848), Irish Anglican priest
- Eddie Barton, New Zealand football (soccer) player

== See also ==
- Edward William Barton-Wright (1860–1951), British entrepreneur
- Edmund Barton (1849–1920), Australian politician and first Australian Prime Minister
