= 1956 Chatham Cup =

Tournament details
- Venue(s): Basin Reserve, Wellington
- Dates: 25 August 1956

Final positions
- Champions: Stop Out
- Runners-up: Shamrock

The 1956 Chatham Cup was the 29th annual nationwide knockout football competition in New Zealand.

The competition was run on a regional basis, with regional associations each holding separate qualifying rounds. Teams taking part in the final rounds are known to have included Eastern Suburbs (Auckland), Rangers (Bay of Plenty), Hamilton Wanderers, Eastern Union (Gisborne), Moturoa (New Plymouth), Colenso Athletic (Hawkes Bay), Wanganui New Settlers, Kiwi United (Manawatu), Masterton Athletic (Wairarapa), Stop Out (Lower Hutt), Shamrock (Christchurch), West End (South Canterbury) and Northern (Dunedin).

The Brigadiers team of Invercargill, which met Shamrock in the 1956 South Island final, was coached by George Roberts. A life member of Western A.F.C. Roberts, a Canterbury representative, had played in five previous Chatham Cup finals.

== The 1956 final ==
Lower Hutt's Stop Out celebrated its jubilee year with a solid win in the final. The team scored early through a header from Jack Sharp, a goal which was followed by a spectacular strike from Brian Sergeant and further goals from Abram Schryvers, and Fred Benge. Shamrock could only manage a consolation goal late on from Ernie Fields.

The Shamrock and Stop Out sides had played each other earlier in 1956 for the Valmai Memorial Trophy with Stop Out winning the Easter fixture.

== Results ==
=== Regional finals ===
Otago Final
9 June 1956

Northern	3 - 0	Roslyn-Wakari AFC

Caledonian Ground, Dunedin
Canterbury Final
16 June 1956

Western A.F.C.	1 - 2	Shamrock
McDonald	Report	Newsome, Fields

Referee: Mr. S. Sweeney

=== Quarter-finals ===
28 July 1956

Cobden-Greymouth	0 - 9	Shamrock
	Report

Recreation Ground, Greymouth
21 July 1956

Northern	1 - 2	Brigadiers (Invercargill)

Caledonian Ground, Dunedin
21 July 1956

Masterton Athletic	3 - 7	Stop Out

South Park, Masterton
21 July 1956

Eastern Union	1 - 2	Eastern Suburbs

Childers Road, Gisborne

=== Semi-finals ===
11 August 1956

Eastern Suburbs	3 - 7	Stop Out
D. Anderson, R. King, ?	Report	A. Schryvers ×5, B. Sergent, J. Sharp

Blandford Park, Auckland
Referee: Mr. H. G. Royce
11 August 1956

Shamrock	2 - 0	Brigadiers (Invercargill)
Fields ×2	Report

English Park, Christchurch
Referee: Mr. M. Swain

=== Final ===
25 August 1956

Stop Out	4 – 1	Shamrock
Sharp, Sergent, Schryvers, Benge	Report	Fields

Basin Reserve, Wellington
Referee: E.O. Mason
