= 2026 Chatham Cup final =

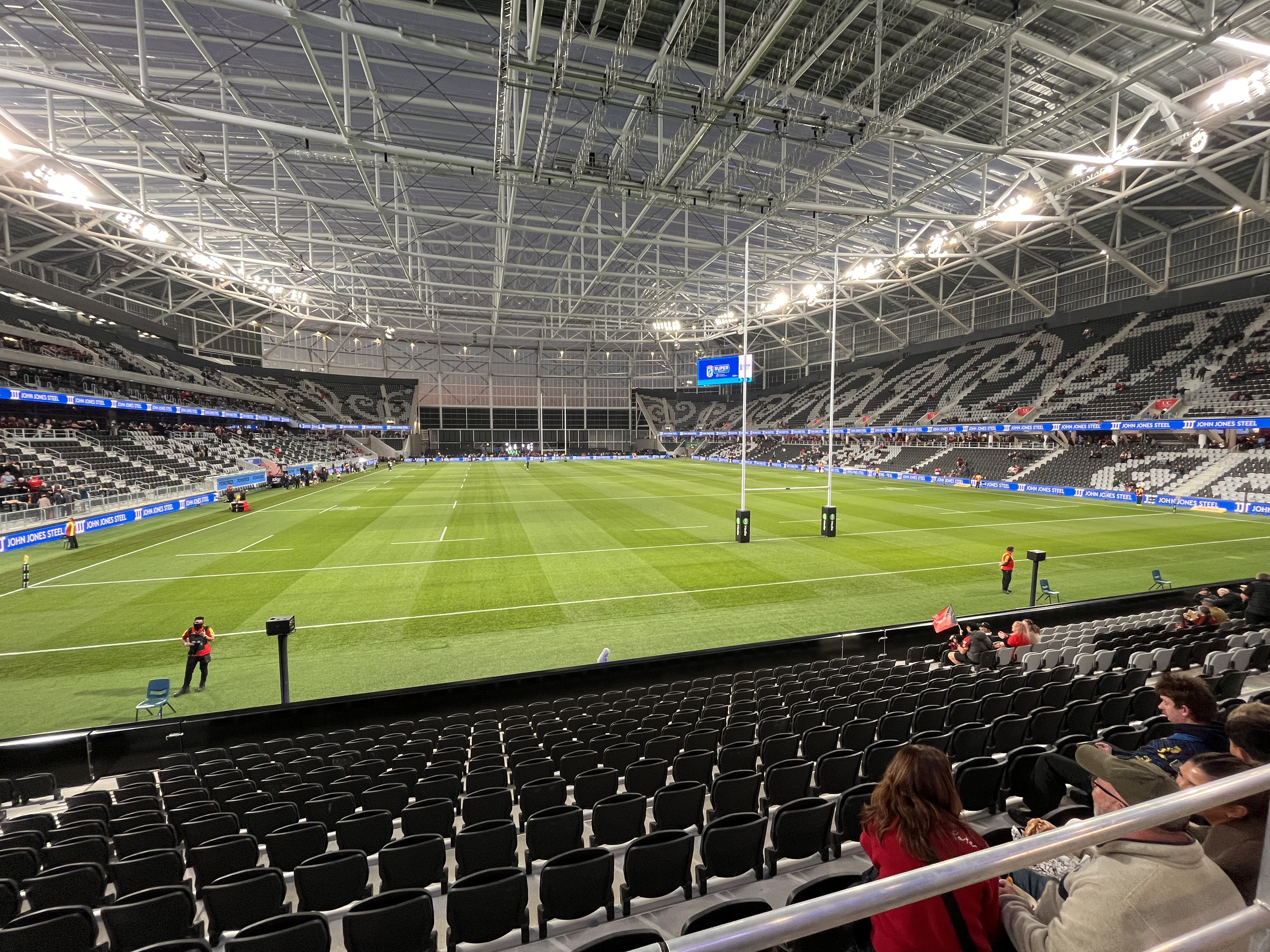
- The match took place at One New Zealand Stadium at Te Kaha.
- Event: 2026 Chatham Cup
Cashmere Technical	Fencibles United
1	2
- Date: 5 September 2026
- Venue: One New Zealand Stadium, Christchurch
- Jack Batty Cup: Yoichi Kawachi
- Referee: Anna-Marie Keighley
- Attendance: 11,267
- Weather: Fair; 18 °C (64 °F); 37% humidity

The 2026 Chatham Cup final was a football match played at One New Zealand Stadium in Christchurch, New Zealand, on 5 September 2026 to determine the winners of the 2026 Chatham Cup. It was the 98th final of New Zealand football's primary cup competition, the Chatham Cup.

The final was contested between Southern League club Cashmere Technical and Northern League club Fencibles United. This was the first time these two sides have met in the final.

== Route to the final ==
=== Cashmere Technical ===
Cashmere Technical's route to the final
Round	Opposition	Score
1	FC Twenty 11 (A)	12–0
2	Waimakariri United (A)	3–0
3	Ferrymead Bays (A)	4–3
4	Dunedin City Royals (A)	9–0
QF	Northern (A)	3–0
SF	Napier City Rovers (H)	2–1
Key: (H) = Home venue; (A) = Away venue

This is Cashmere's 11th final. The club previously won in 2013, 2014 and 2021. They also won it as Christchurch Technical Old Boys in 1948.

As a Southern League team, Cashmere Technical entered the tournament in round 1. Cashmere were drawn away to Canterbury Championship team FC Twenty 11, going on to beat them 12–0. After this, they beat Canterbury Premiership side Waimakariri United 3–0. In round 3, Cashmere beat fellow Southern League and National League side Ferrymead Bays 4–3, also winning the MacFarlane Cup. (Note: MacFarlane Cup is awarded to the last remaining Canterbury side left in the Chatham Cup.) Round 4 saw Cashmere drawn away to Southern League side Dunedin City Royals, coming away with a 9–0 win. As the competition entered the national stage, Cashmere were once again drawn to another Southern League side Northern. The match ended 3–0. In the semi-finals, Cashmere Technical were drawn at home to Napier City Rovers, winning 2–1.

=== Fencibles United ===
Fencibles United's route to the final
Round	Opposition	Score
2	Papamoa (H)	6–1
3	Birkenhead United (A)	3–1
4	South Auckland Rangers (H)	3–0
QF	Auckland City (H)	3–2
SF	Nelson Suburbs (H)	3–0
Key: (H) = Home venue; (A) = Away venue

This is Fencibles United's first final.

Fencibles United entered the tournament in round 2, as a Northern League team. They began with a 6–1 home victory over NRFL Southern Conference side Papamoa. Ethan Holder scored a hattrick, while Nicholas Rooney, Dastgeer Lai-Sai and an own-goal saw them win comfortably.

== Pre-match ==
New Zealand Football confirmed that the 2026 final would begin at 16:00.

This and the Kate Sheppard Cup will be the first football matches to be played at One New Zealand Stadium.

=== Broadcasting ===
The final will be shown live and free on FIFA+ via DAZN.

== Match ==
=== Details ===
5 September 2026
16:00

Cashmere Technical	1–2	Fencibles United
Murphy 62'	Report	Muñoz 33'; Nicol 80'

One New Zealand Stadium, Christchurch
Attendance: 11,267
Referee: Anna-Marie Keighley

Cashmere Technical	Fencibles United

GK	1	(New Zealand) Pieter Taco Bierema
RB	20	(New Zealand) James Brittain
CB	2	(Republic of Ireland) Danny Kane	(yellow card) 41'
CB	6	(England) Tom Schwarz (c)		(substituted off) 70'
LB	41	(New Zealand) Nicholas Murphy		(substituted off) 88'
CM	8	(New Zealand) Alex Ballard
CM	28	(Japan) Yuya Taguchi
CM	5	(New Zealand) Finn Caughey		(substituted off) 70'
RW	16	(New Zealand) Zander Edwards		(substituted off) 88'
CF	10	(Republic of Ireland) Garbhan Coughlan
LW	19	(New Zealand) Lyle Matthysen
Substitutes:
GK	22	(New Zealand) Reuben Harrison
DF	17	(New Zealand) Lachlan McIsaac		(substituted on) 88'
DF	25	(New Zealand) Erik Panzer		(substituted on) 70'
MF	23	(New Zealand) Edy Belingher
FW	9	(New Zealand) Rory Hibbert		(substituted on) 70'
FW	14	(New Zealand) Gabriel Gallaway
FW	15	(New Zealand) Charlie Peacocke		(substituted on) 88'
Manager:
(England) Dan Schwarz

GK	20	(Japan) Sota Yuasa
CB	23	(New Zealand) Dylan Morris
CB	7	(England) Jordan Boon
CB	5	(New Zealand) Finn Wessels
RM	18	(New Zealand) Liam Wessels
CM	14	(Japan) Yoichi Kawachi	(substituted off) 88'
CM	17	(New Zealand) Connor Probert (c)
CM	12	(New Zealand) Ryan Clarke	(substituted off) 73'
LM	11	(New Zealand) Aiden Purkiss	(substituted off) 73'
CF	9	(Chile) Ronaldo Muñoz
CF	4	(New Zealand) Dylan Laing-McConnell
Substitutes:
DF	6	(New Zealand) Harrison Lloyd	(substituted on) 88'
DF	16	(New Zealand) Nicholas Rooney
MF	3	(Chile) Leonardo Gavilán
MF	8	(New Zealand) Kodie Nicol	(substituted on) 73'
MF	9	(South Africa) Dastgeer Lai-Sai
MF	21	(New Zealand) Nikola Stoychev
FW	13	(New Zealand) Riwai Rangihuna-Stanton	(substituted on) 73'
Manager:
(New Zealand) Rhys Ruka

Man of the Match:
Yoichi Kawachi (Fencibles United)

Assistant referees:
Isaac Trevis
Cameron Gruschow
Fourth official:
Ben O'Connell

Match rules

- 90 minutes
- 30 minutes of extra time if necessary
- Penalty shoot-out if scores still level
- Seven named substitutes
- Maximum of five substitutions, with a sixth allowed in extra time (Note: Each team was given only three opportunities to make substitutions, with a fourth opportunity in extra time, excluding substitutions made at half-time, before the start of extra time and at half-time in extra time.)

=== Statistics ===
Overall
Statistic	Cashmere Technical	Fencibles United
Goals scored	1	2
Shots on target	9	9
Ball possession	47%	53%
Corner kicks	2	7
Fouls committed	9	5
Offsides	0	0
Yellow cards	1	0
Red cards	0	0
