= 1935 Chatham Cup =

Tournament details
- Venue(s): Basin Reserve, Wellington
- Dates: 31 August 1935

Final positions
- Champions: Hospital (1st title)
- Runners-up: Western

The 1935 Chatham Cup was the 13th annual nationwide knockout football competition in New Zealand.

The competition was run on a regional basis, with regional associations each holding separate qualifying rounds.

Teams taking part in the final rounds are known to have included Ponsonby, Hamilton Wanderers, Western (Christchurch), and Hospital (Wellington).

== The 1935 final ==
In the final, in front of a crowd of around 5,500, Hospital scored after just nine minutes through W. McGrory and Billy Woods added a second for a half-time lead of two goals to nil. A third was added from the penalty spot by A. Gibb midway through the second half. Hospital conceded a late consolation goal from Merv Gordon. The referee, W.P. Smith of Otago, was the first non-Wellingtonian to control a final.

== Results ==
Canterbury Final
13 July 1935

Western	6 - 0	Nomads
G. Smith ×5, S. Ellis	Report

English Park, Christchurch
Referee: Mr. E. B. Harris
Wellington Final
20 July 1935

Hospital	2 - 0	Waterside
W. Woods, Webster	Report

Basin Reserve, Wellington
Referee: Mr. J. Sanderson
Buller/Westland Final
27 July 1935

Millerton All Blacks	5 - 0	Greymouth Marist
T. Blyth ×2, Scott, Orman ×2	Report

Millerton Domain, Millerton
Auckland/South Auckland (Waikato) Final
27 July 1935

Ponsonby	4 - 2	Hamilton Wanderers
Mullane ×2, Riggans, Wiseman	Report	Lark, Crabb

Blandford Park, Auckland
Referee: Mr. A. Firth

=== Semi-finals ("Island finals") ===
North Island Final
17 August 1935

Ponsonby	0 - 3	Hospital
	Report	Woods ×2, Gibb

Blandford Park, Auckland
Referee: Mr. G. Shand
South Island Final
10 August 1935

Millerton All Blacks	0 - 0 aet	Western
	Report

Victoria Park, Greymouth
Referee: Mr. S. Hewison
South Island Final Replay
24 August 1935

Millerton All Blacks	1 - 2	Western
Scott	Report	S. Ellis ×2

Victoria Park, Greymouth
Referee: Mr. S. Hewison

=== Final ===
1935 Chatham Cup Final
31 August 1935

Hospital	3 – 1	Western
McGrory, B. Woods, Gibb	Report	Gordon

Basin Reserve, Wellington
Referee: Mr. W.P. Smith
