= Eddie Barton =

New Zealand footballer

Personal information
- Full name: Edward James Barton
- Place of birth: New Zealand

Senior career*
Years	Team	Apps	(Gls)
- Wellington Marist

International career
1933	New Zealand	1	(0)
- * Club domestic league appearances and goals

Edward James Barton was an association football player who represented New Zealand at international level.

Barton made a single appearance in an official international for the All Whites in a 2–4 loss to Australia in Brisbane on 5 June 1933.

An outside-right, Barton played for Wellington Marist in the Wellington competition, and represented Wellington in inter-provincial football from 1924 to 1934. He was only the third player to score a hat-trick in the final of the Chatham Cup. Playing for Wellington Marist, he scored three goals against Millerton All Blacks in the 1932 Chatham Cup final.

Barton's wife Eileen died in August 1959. Their son Paul played Test cricket for New Zealand in the 1960s.
