= 1984 Chatham Cup =

Tournament details
- Venue(s): Mount Smart Stadium, Auckland
- Dates: 13 October 1984

Final positions
- Champions: Manurewa (3rd title)
- Runners-up: Gisborne City

The 1984 Chatham Cup was the 57th annual nationwide knockout football competition in New Zealand.

Early stages of the competition were run in three regions (northern, central, and southern), with the National League teams receiving a bye until the fourth round (last 32) of the competition. In all, 128 teams took part in the competition. Note: Different sources give different numberings for the rounds of the competition: some start round one with the beginning of the regional qualifications; others start numbering from the first national knock-out stage. The former numbering scheme is used in this article.

== The 1984 final ==
The final was shifted by one month from its normal date in early September, being played in October for the first time. Gisborne was expected to win the trophy, being on paper as the stronger side, with internationals Grant Turner, Kenny Cresswell and Colin Walker all in their line-up.

In the final, however, it was Manurewa who proved the sturdier side. Largely through the efforts of keeper Rudi Feitsma the soaked up the Gisborne pressure, while swift breaks saw Manurewa score twice with a brace from Steve Sumner in the 11th and 28th minutes. A strike from Cresswell in the 80th minute gave the East Coast side some hope of a comeback, but it was too late to save the day.

== Results ==
=== Third round ===
Birkenhead United	0 – 2	Rotorua Suburbs

Blockhouse Bay	4 – 0	Otahuhu United

Cambridge	1 – 3	Lynndale (Auckland)

Christchurch HSOB	0 – 5	Cashmere Wanderers

Christchurch Rangers	5 – 2	Burndale United

East Coast Bays	3 – 0	Clendon United

Eden	2 – 0	Glenfield Rovers

Ellerslie	1 – 2	Mount Maunganui

Green Island	3 – 0	Oamaru

Howick	3 – 2	Eastern Suburbs (Auckland)

New Brighton	1 – 1*	Saint Albans-Shirley

Ngaruawahia Affco United	2 – 0	Taupo

Nomads United (Christchurch)	3 – 1	Shamrock (Christchurch)

Oratia United	3 – 1	Metro College

Otara Rangers	2 – 1	Grey Lynn

Roslyn-Wakari	0 – 1	North End United (Dunedin)

Seatoun	0 – 2	Raumati Hearts

Waitemata City	5 – 0	Tauranga City

Wellington City	1 – 3	Stop Out (Lower Hutt)

Wellington Olympic	0 – 1	Tawa

* Won on penalties by New Brighton (5–3)

=== Fourth round ===
Christchurch United	4 – 0	Christchurch Rangers

Dunedin City	5 – 2	Nomads United

Green Island	0 – 5	North End United

Mount Maunganui	3 – 0	Eden

Mount Wellington	2 – 0	Otara Rangers

Napier City Rovers	0 – 1	Gisborne City

Nelson United	1 – 2	Stop Out

New Brighton	0 – 1	Cashmere Wanderers

Ngaruawahia Affco United	1 – 0	Lynndale

North Shore United	3 – 2	Blockhouse Bay

Oratia United	1 – 2	Manurewa

Papatoetoe	4 – 1	Waitemata City

Raumati Hearts	1 – 2	Miramar Rangers

Rotorua Suburbs	2 – 4	East Coast Bays

University (Auckland)	0 – 1	Howick

Wellington Diamond United	4 – 1	Tawa

=== Fifth round ===
Christchurch United	6 – 0	North End United

Dunedin City	2 – 1	Cashmere Wanderers

Gisborne City	2 – 0	Wellington Diamond United

Manurewa	2 – 1	Mount Maunganui

Ngaruawahia Affco United	0 – 1	East Coast Bays

North Shore United	3 – 2	Mount Wellington

Papatoetoe	5 – 2	Howick

Stop Out	3 – 2 (aet)	Miramar Rangers

=== Quarter-finals ===
Christchurch United	1 – 0	Dunedin City

Manurewa	0 – 0 (aet)*	Papatoetoe

North Shore United	2 – 1	East Coast Bays

Stop Out	0 – 5	Gisborne City

* Manurewa won 4–3 on penalties

=== Semi-finals ===
Gisborne City	2 – 0	North Shore United

Manurewa	0 – 0 (aet)	Christchurch United

==== Replay ====
Manurewa	1 – 0	Christchurch United

=== Final ===
13 October 1984

Manurewa	2 – 1	Gisborne City
Sumner ×2		Cresswell

Mount Smart Stadium, Auckland
Referee: K. Copeland
