= 1981 Chatham Cup =

Tournament details
- Venue(s): Basin Reserve, Wellington
- Dates: 22 August 1981

Final positions
- Champions: Dunedin City (1st title)
- Runners-up: Mount Wellington

The 1981 Chatham Cup was the 54th annual nationwide knockout football competition in New Zealand.

Early stages of the competition were run in three regions (northern, central, and southern), with the National League teams receiving a bye until the Fourth Round of the competition. In all, 124 teams took part in the competition. Note: Different sources give different numberings for the rounds of the competition: some start round one with the beginning of the regional qualifications; others start numbering from the first national knock-out stage. The former numbering scheme is used in this article.

The major talking-point of the 1981 competition was the giant-killing run of Stop Out, who caused upsets against the higher-ranked Nelson United, Miramar Rangers and Wellington Diamond United on their way to the semi-finals.

== The 1981 final ==
The final was a repeat of the 1980 final, but this time it was Dunedin City that finished victorious - the first win for any team from that southern city since 1961.

An early goal from a Billy McClure penalty put the Mount into the lead, but a brace of well-taken goals by Michael Glubb, complemented by a late strike from Terry Wilson were enough to take the cup south.

== Results ==
=== Third Round ===
Birkenhead United	1 – 0	Mount Roskill

Cashmere Wanderers	0 – 1	New Brighton

Courier Rangers (Auckland)	0 – 7	Papatoetoe

Dunedin Technical	4 – 0	Caversham

Freyberg Old Boys (Palmerston N.)	1 – 2	Havelock North Wanderers

Horowhenua CPFP	3 – 2	Masterton

Invercargill Thistle	1 – 2	Green Island

Island Bay United	2 – 3	Lower Hutt City

Kelston West	0 – 1	Waitemata City

Napier City Rovers	10 – 1	Taradale

Newlands Paparangi	1 – 4	Stokes Valley

Ngaruawahia Affco United	0 – 1	Rotorua City

Papakura City	1 – 1*	Blockhouse Bay

Porirua United	0 – 2	Wellington City

Stop Out (Lower Hutt)	2 – 0	Nelson United

Taranaki United (New Plymouth)	1 – 6	Manawatu United (Palmerston N.)

Thames	0 – 4	Ellerslie

Waterside (Wellington)	3 – 0	Tawa

Western (Christchurch)	3 – 0	Shamrock (Christchurch)

Whangarei City	0 – 1	East Coast Bays

* Won on penalties by Papakura City (8–7)

=== Fourth Round ===
Birkenhead United	2 – 4	Manurewa

Christchurch Rangers	0 – 0*	Green Island

Christchurch United	4 – 0	Western

Dunedin City	2 – 0	New Brighton

Gisborne City	3 – 1	Napier City Rovers

Hamilton	3 – 0	East Coast Bays

Havelock North Wanderers	0 – 2	Waterside

Horowhenua CPFP	1 – 5	Wellington Diamond United

Lower Hutt City	1 – 2	Manawatu United

Miramar Rangers	1 – 2	Stop Out

Mount Wellington	3 – 2	Waitemata City

North Shore United	3 – 0	Rotorua City

Papakura City	0 – 2	Papatoetoe

Stokes Valley	0 – 4	Wellington City

Takapuna City	1 – 4	Ellerslie

Woolston W.M.C.	3 – 1	Dunedin Technical

* Won on penalties by Christchurch Rangers (5–4)

=== Fifth Round ===
Christchurch Rangers	0 – 4	Dunedin City

Christchurch United	2 – 1	Woolston W.M.C.

Ellerslie	1 – 3	Hamilton

Gisborne City	2 – 0	Manawatu United

Mount Wellington	4 – 2	Manurewa

Papatoetoe	1 – 1 (aet)*	North Shore United

Stop Out	3 – 0	Wellington City

Waterside	1 – 4	Wellington Diamond United

* North Shore United won 5–4 on penalties.

=== Quarter-finals ===
Dunedin City	3 – 1	Christchurch United

Mount Wellington	3 – 1	Gisborne City

North Shore United	1 – 0	Hamilton

Stop Out	2 – 2 (aet)*	Wellington Diamond United

* Stop Out won 4–2 on penalties.

=== Semi-finals ===
Dunedin City	3 – 1	Stop Out

Mount Wellington	2 – 0	North Shore United

=== Final ===
22 August 1981

Dunedin City	3 – 1	Mount Wellington
Glubb 2, Wilson		McClure (pen.)

Basin Reserve, Wellington
Referee: N. Burt
