= 1994 Chatham Cup =

Tournament details
- Venue(s): McLean Park, Napier
- Dates: , 1994

Final positions
- Champions: Waitakere City (1st title)
- Runners-up: Wellington Olympic

Awards
- Jack Batty Memorial Cup: Ivan Vicelich (Waitakere City)

The 1994 Chatham Cup was the 67th annual nationwide knockout football competition in New Zealand.

Up to the last 16 of the competition, the cup was run in three regions (northern, central, and southern), with an open draw from the quarter-finals on. National League teams received a bye until the third round (last 64). In all, 141 teams took part in the competition, which consisted of a preliminary round followed by five rounds proper, quarter-finals, semi-finals, and a final. Note: Different sources give different numberings for the rounds of the competition. Some record five rounds prior to the quarter-finals; others note a preliminary round followed by four full rounds. The first of these notations is used in this article.

== The 1994 final ==
Waitakere City won the final, part of a 31-match undefeated run in all competitions.

The Jack Batty Memorial Cup is awarded to the player adjudged to have made to most positive impact in the Chatham Cup final. The winner of the 1994 Jack Batty Memorial Cup was Ivan Vicelich of Waitakere City.

== Results ==
=== Third Round ===
Burnside United (Christchurch)	2 – 1	Christchurch United

Cambridge	2 – 6	Mount Wellington

Caversham	7 – 1	Northern (Dunedin)

Christchurch Technical	2 – 0	Halswell United

Dunedin Technical	1 – 2	Roslyn-Wakari

Eastern Suburbs (Auckland)	0 – 8	Manurewa

Eden (Auckland)	1 – 4	North Shore United

Ellerslie	3 – 2	Oratia United

Green Island	3 – 2	Invercargill Thistle

Island Bay United	0 – 1	Wellington United

Lynndale (Auckland)	6 – 1	Waikato Unicol (Hamilton)

Manawatu	0 – 3	New Plymouth Rangers

Palmerston North Marist	0 – 1	Stokes Valley

Melville (Hamilton)	4 – 2	Onehunga Sports

Mount Albert-Ponsonby	3 – 0	Metro (Auckland)

Nelson United	1 – 4	Miramar Rangers

New Brighton	2 – 0	South Canterbury United (Timaru)

New Plymouth City	0 – 1	Petone

Ngaruawahia United	0 – 6	Mount Maunganui

Nomads United (Christchurch)	0 – 1	Cashmere Wanderers

Papatoetoe	4 – 0	West Harbour (Auckland)

Paraparaumu United	w/o	North Wellington

Raumati Hearts	1 – 0	Tararua United (Upper Hutt)

Stop Out (Lower Hutt)	0 – 6	Napier City Rovers

Tauranga City	1 – 4	Takapuna City

Tawa	5 – 0	Levin United

Victoria University	3 – 2	Takaro

Waikato United (Hamilton)	5 – 5 (aet)*	Central (Auckland)

Waitakere City	2 – 0	Blockhouse Bay

Wellington Olympic	4 – 0	Lower Hutt City

Woodleigh Cosmos (New Plymouth)	3 – 7	Wanganui East Athletic

Woolston WMC	0 – 4	Christchurch Rangers

* Won on penalties by Central (5-4)

=== Fourth Round ===
Burnside United	1 – 0	Caversham

Central	1 – 2	Mount Albert-Ponsonby

Christchurch Rangers	4 – 0	Cashmere Wanderers

Christchurch Technical	1 – 2	Roslyn-Wakari

Green Island	4 – 3	New Brighton

Lynndale	1 – 2	Papatoetoe

Manurewa	3 – 2	Ellerslie

Melville	2 – 4	Mount Maunganui

Napier City Rovers	3 – 1	Victoria University

North Shore United	2 – 0	Mount Wellington

Petone	8 – 1	Paraparaumu United

Stokes Valley	1 – 2	Raumati Hearts

Takapuna City	0 – 5	Waitakere City

Tawa	3 – 2	New Plymouth Rangers

Wanganui East Athletic	3 – 4	Wellington United

Wellington Olympic	1 – 0	Miramar Rangers

=== Fifth Round ===
Manurewa	1 – 2	Mount Albert-Ponsonby

Mount Maunganui	1 – 3	Waitakere City

Napier City Rovers	1 – 0	Papatoetoe

Petone	2 – 1	Wellington United

Raumati Hearts	1 – 0	Christchurch Rangers

Roslyn-Wakari	0 – 2	Burnside United

Tawa	1 – 2	North Shore United

Wellington Olympic	5 – 0	Green Island

=== Quarter-finals ===
Burnside United	0 – 2	Wellington Olympic

North Shore United	3 – 2	Napier City Rovers

Petone	2 – 0	Raumati Hearts

Waitakere City	3 – 0	Mount Albert-Ponsonby

=== Semi-finals ===
North Shore United	2 – 5	Waitakere City

Wellington Olympic	5 – 1	Petone

=== Final ===
Waitakere City	1 – 0	Wellington Olympic
Barkley

McLean Park, Napier
