= Hauchard =

Hauchard is a surname. Notable people with the surname include:

- Arnaud Hauchard (born 1971), French chess grandmaster
- Lucas Hauchard (born 1996), French YouTuber

== See also ==
- Hatchard
