= Hatchard =

Hatchard is a surname. Notable people with the surname include:

- Anne Hatchard (born 1998), Australian football player
- Caroline Hatchard (1883–1970), British soprano, musical theatre and opera singer
- Danny Hatchard (born 1991), English actor
- Jack Hatchard (1917–1984), New Zealand football player
- John Hatchard (1769–1849), English publisher and bookseller
- Thomas Hatchard (1818–1870), English bishop of Mauritius
