= Benge (surname) =

Benge is an English surname. Notable people with this name include:

- Alfreda Benge (born 1940), British lyricist and illustrator
- Bob Benge (1762–1794), American Indian leader
- Carson Benge (born 2003), American baseball player
- Chris Benge (born 1962), American politician
- Elden Benge (1904–1960), American trumpet player and maker
- Fred Benge, New Zealand association football player
- Harvey Benge (1944–2019), New Zealand photographer
- Howard Benge (1913–1986), New Zealand rower
- Ray Benge (1902–1997), American baseball player
- Wilson Benge (1875–1955), English actor

== Fictional characters ==
- Connie Benge, a fictional character on the American animated sitcom Doug
