= 1949 Chatham Cup =

Tournament details
- Venue(s): Basin Reserve, Wellington
- Dates: 27 August 1949

Final positions
- Champions: Petone (3rd title)
- Runners-up: Northern

The 1949 Chatham Cup was the 22nd annual nationwide knockout football competition in New Zealand.

The competition was run on a regional basis, with regional associations each holding separate qualifying rounds. Teams taking part in the final rounds are known to have included: Eden (Auckland), Hamilton Wanderers, Rotowaro Tigers (Waikato), Moturoa (New Plymouth), Ohakea (Manawatu), Petone Settlers, Waterside (Wellington), Wigram, Technical Old Boys, Nomads (Christchurch), Northern, Green Island (Dunedin), Stockton (West Coast) and Invercargill Thistle (Southland).

== The 1949 final ==
The final was played in front of a then-record crowd of 12,000. Interest was high as the local Wellingtonian team was a lower ranked team (in the second division of Wellington football) who had gained a reputation as giant-killers. They went on to win the final 1–0 after having beaten several higher ranked sides in the course of the tournament, including a narrow win over Waterside and a heavy 7–1 thrashing of Wellington Marist. The final is memorable for the magic of the giant-killing performance, which caught the imagination of the local population. The only goal of the match came in the second half, when Northern keeper Jim Stephenson parried a David McKissock shot directly into the path of Petone forward Wally Hewitt who duly scored. Petone survived a late scare when keeper Ben Savage was required to save a penalty, and the Settlers of Petone held on to win by the solitary goal.

== Results ==
11 June 1949

Northern	6 - 0	Mosgiel AFC
Berry ×3, Ives, I. Walsh ×2	Report

Caledonian Ground, Dunedin
Referee: Mr. D. Welham
11 June 1949

Green Island FC	3 - 1	Roslyn-Wakari AFC
J. Quartermain ×3	Report	P. Robinson

Caledonian Ground, Dunedin
Referee: Mr. F. King
2 July 1949

Northern	8 - 0	Green Island FC
H. Jenkins ×3, Berry ×3, I. Walsh ×2	Report

Caledonian Ground, Dunedin
Referee: Mr. W. P. Smith
2 July 1949

Nomads	3 - 2	Shamrock
E. Kenny ×2, R. Cullen	Report	A. Hilton, W. McFarland

English Park, Christchurch
Referee: Mr. T. Gottermeyer
16 July 1949

Petone Settlers	3 - 1	Institute Old Boys

Basin Reserve, Wellington
16 July 1949

Waterside	5 - 1	Seatoun AFC

Basin Reserve, Wellington
23 July 1949

Moturoa AFC	1 - 6	Ohakea
J. Collings	Report	Kelly ×3, Speakman ×2, Regan

Western Park, New Plymouth
Referee: Mr. J.M. Thompson (Wanganui)
24 July 1949

Petone Settlers	1 - 1	Waterside
	Report

Basin Reserve, Wellington
23 July 1949

Christchurch Technical Old Boys	5 - 4	Nomads
J. McLennan ×3, C. Bailey, M. Dean	Report	R. Cullen ×2, P. Fox, E. Kenny

Referee: Mr. T. Mathie
26 July 1949

Christchurch Technical Old Boys	4 - 0	Wigram
K. Lucas, J. McLennan ×3	Report

English Park, Christchurch
Referee: Mr. T. Gottemeyer

=== North Island Semi-Finals ===
6 August 1949

Petone Settlers	2 - 0	Ohakea
	Report

Basin Reserve, Wellington
23 July 1949

Eden	3 - 2	Rotowaro Tigers

Blandford Park, Auckland

=== South Island Semi-Finals ===
30 July 1949

Christchurch Technical Old Boys	14 - 0	Stockton
P. O'Malley ×5, C. Bailey ×4, K. Lucas ×3, J. McLennan ×2	Report

English Park, Christchurch
Referee: Mr. P. Consedine
16 July 1949

Invercargill Thistle	0 - 9	Northern

North Island Final
13 August 1949

Eden	2 - 2	Petone Settlers
Brewer ×2	Report	Gale, Jakens

Blandford Park, Auckland
Referee: Mr. F. O. Green

Match abandoned after 2 hours and 10 minutes of play due to bad light.

North Island Final Replay
20 August 1949

Petone Settlers	4 - 0	Eden
	Report

Basin Reserve, Wellington
Attendance: 8000
South Island Final
6 August 1949

Northern	3 - 2	Christchurch Technical Old Boys
W. Berry, I, Walsh, M. Ives (pen.)	Report	V. Smith, C. Bailey

Caledonian Ground, Dunedin
Referee: Mr. W. M. Smith
1949 Chatham Cup Final
27 August 1949

Petone Settlers	1 - 0	Northern
Hewitt

Basin Reserve, Wellington
Referee: F. Callaghan
