= 1955 Chatham Cup =

Tournament details
- Venue(s): Basin Reserve, Wellington
- Dates: 3 September 1955

Final positions
- Champions: Western (4th title)
- Runners-up: Eastern Suburbs

The 1955 Chatham Cup was the 28th annual nationwide knockout football competition in New Zealand.

The competition was run on a regional basis, with regional associations each holding separate qualifying rounds.

Teams taking part in the final rounds are known to have included Eastern Suburbs (Auckland), Huntly Thistle (Waikato), Eastern Union (Gisborne), New Plymouth Old Boys (Taranaki) Napier Rovers (Hawkes Bay), Wanganui Athletic (Whanganui), Kiwi United (Manawatu), Masterton Athletic (Wairarapa) Victoria University (Wellington), Western (Christchurch), and Roslyn-Wakari (Dunedin).

== The 1955 final ==
In the final, winger Peter Saunderson became the seventh player to score a finals hat-trick. Western's total of six goals equalled Waterside's tally from the 1940 final, and the aggregate of eight goals also equalled the record set in that final. The game was played in a howling Wellington southerly, and Western made full use of it in the first half, rattling in four goals. John White and Alex Davis had both scored in the opening dozen minutes, and these were added to by both Saunderson and Stan Ralph. In the second half Anderson and King reduced the deficit to two before Saunderson scored a further brace to seal the win for the southerners. King's goal was his sixth in Chatham Cup finals, after a hat-trick in the 1951 Final and two more in 1953.

== Results ==
=== Quarter Finals ===
13 August 1955

Eastern Suburbs	6 - 1	Huntly Thistle

Blandford Park, Auckland
16 July 1955

Brigadiers	1 - 2	Roslyn-Wakari

Invercargill Showgrounds, Invercargill
13 August 1955

Victoria University	4 - 1	Kiwi United

Basin Reserve, Wellington
6 August 1955

Western	w/o Western won by default	Millerton Thistle
	Report

English Park, Christchurch

=== Semi Finals ===
South Island Final
13 August 1955

Roslyn-Wakari	2 - 2 Western won match on corners 3–1	Western

Caledonian Ground, Dunedin
Referee: D. Bruce (Timaru)
North Island Final
20 August 1955

Eastern Suburbs	4 - 1	Victoria University
Fleet 3, King	Report	Gray

Blandford Park, Auckland

=== Final ===
1955 Chatham Cup Final
3 September 1955

Western	6 – 2	Eastern Suburbs
Saunderson 3, White, Davis, Ralph	Report	Anderson, King

Basin Reserve, Wellington
Referee: R.H. Scott
