= Alex Davis (footballer) =

New Zealand footballer

Alex Davis AKA Dave
Personal information
- Full name: Alex Davis
- Place of birth: New Zealand
- Position: Outside left

Senior career*
Years	Team	Apps	(Gls)
	Western	100	(6)

International career
1952	New Zealand	3	(0)
- * Club domestic league appearances and goals

Alex Davis is a former association football player who represented New Zealand at international level.

Davis played three official A-international matches for New Zealand in 1952, the first a 2–0 win over Pacific neighbours Fiji on 7 September. His other two official appearances were a 2–2 draw and a 5–3 win over Tahiti on 21 September and 28 September 1952 respectively.
