= 1932 Chatham Cup =

Tournament details
- Venue: Basin Reserve
- Dates: 3 September 1932

Final positions
- Champions: Wellington Marist (1st title)
- Runners-up: Millerton All Blacks

The 1932 Chatham Cup was the tenth annual nationwide knockout football competition in New Zealand.

The competition was run on a regional basis, with seven regional associations (Auckland, Walkato, Wellington, Manawatu, Buller, Canterbury, and Otago) each holding separate qualifying rounds.

In the Westland Association qualifying finals, Taylorville were beaten by Dobson. Runanga and Cobden had to play two replays of the second Westland - Chatham Cup semi-final after the first result, a victory for Runanga was protested by Cobden. The first replay was played at Dunollie where the large, raucous crowd eventually spilled on to the ground after a fight between two players with one spectator striking the referee. The result to Cobden was protested by Runanga. In the deciding third match Cobden finally beat Runanga.

In the Westland Chatham Cup final at Victoria Park, Dobson drew with Cobden. In the replay a week later on the 16th of July, Dobson beat Cobden, once again at Victoria Park.

Less than a month before its match against Wellington Marist, St Andrews, while at the top of the Manawatu league, lost two of its most experienced players in R. Corkindale and J. Stewart who both were granted transfers by the N.Z.F.A. to join cup rival Hamilton Wanderers. Both players subsequently went onto to assist Hamilton Wanderers to the 1932 North Island Chatham Cup Final.

Teams taking part in the final rounds are known to have included Auckland YMCA, Hamilton Wanderers, St. Andrews (Manawatu), Wellington Marist, Riccarton, Millerton All Blacks (Buller) and Maori Hill (Dunedin).

== The 1932 final ==
Wellington Marist's Eddie Barton became the third player in Chatham Cup history to score a final hat-trick, in front of a crowd of 5000 at the Basin Reserve. The five-goal margin in the final remained a record until 1958. The game was described by contemporary sources as being a fine one, though it was one-sided. The first goal came after 25 minutes when Marist's Stan Marshment scrambled the ball across the line. Barton doubled the score before the interval. In the second half, playing with the stiff breeze, Jim Kershaw (later to become NZFA Chairman) curled the ball into the net directly from a corner. Millerton didn't take the opportunity to pull one back, missing a penalty, and Marist rubbed home the win with two further goals from Barton late on.

Millerton, a busy coalmining town in the 1930s, is now a ghost town.

== Results ==
Canterbury Final
18 June 1932

Christchurch Thistle	7 - 1	Christchurch Technical Old Boys Reserves
A. Trotter ×4, D. Sutherland, G. Walker, +1 unknown	Report	C. Greenwood

English Park, Christchurch
Referee: Mr. J. Crew
Wellington Final
9 July 1932

Wellington Marist	4 - 2	Hospital
Marshment, Condon, Barton, +1 unknown	Report	Simon, W. Woods

Basin Reserve, Wellington
Referee: Mr. N. Brian
South Auckland (Waikato) Final
9 July 1932

Hamilton Wanderers	3 - 1	Renown
R. Corkindale ×2, J. Stewart	Report	C. Orman

Seddon Park, Hamilton
Referee: Mr. J. Wallace (Huntly)
Auckland Final
16 July 1932

Tramurewa	1 - 2	Auckland Y.M.C.A.
J. Hunter: Spong (red card)	Report	Bell ×2

Blandford Park, Auckland
Referee: Mr. A.C. Parkinson
Westland/Buller Final
23 July 1932

Dobson	2 - 3 aet	Millerton All Blacks
Clasper, W. Wilson	Report	G. Newman, J. Blyth ×2

Victoria Park, Greymouth
Referee: Mr. A. Hamill

=== Quarter-finals ===
Otago Final
23 July 1932

Maori Hill	7 - 0	Port Chalmers
H. Balk, C. Proctor ×3, A. Brown, J. Dalziel (pen.), W. Carse	Report

Logan Park, Dunedin
Referee: Mr. A. Riach
Auckland/South Auckland (Waikato) Final
30 July 1932

Hamilton Wanderers	1 - 0	Auckland Y.M.C.A.
J. Stewart	Report

Seddon Park, Hamilton
Referee: Mr. J. Wallace (Huntly)
Wellington/Manawatu Final
23 July 1932

Wellington Marist	9 - 2	St. Andrews
Marshall 4. J. Kershaw ×3, Bird, Barton	Report	Pitkathley, McShefferey

Basin Reserve, Wellington
Referee: Mr. G. Jackson
Canterbury/Buller Final
6 August 1932

Christchurch Thistle	1 - 3	Millerton All Blacks
G. Clements	Report	T. Blyth, P. Taylor ×2

English Park, Christchurch
Referee: Mr. H. Weatherhead

=== Semi-finals ===
North Island Final
20 August 1932

Hamilton Wanderers	2 - 3	Wellington Marist
J. Stewart, K. Cavaye	Report	T. Marshall ×2, (Caldwell og.)

Seddon Park, Hamilton
Attendance: 1500
Referee: Jas. Baillie
South Island Final
20 August 1932

Maori Hill	1 - 3	Millerton All Blacks
C. Proctor	Report	J. Cowan, J. Blyth, P. Taylor

Logan Park, Dunedin
Attendance: 1500
Referee: F. G. Smith

=== Final ===
1932 Chatham Cup Final
3 September 1932

Wellington Marist	5 – 0	Millerton All Blacks
E. Barton ×3, S. Marshment, J. Kershaw	Report

Basin Reserve, Wellington
Attendance: 5000
Referee: Mr. T. Plant
