= Billy Woods (New Zealand footballer) =

New Zealand footballer

Personal information
- Full name: William S Woods
- Place of birth: New Zealand

Senior career*
Years	Team	Apps	(Gls)
- Hospital

International career
1947	New Zealand	3	(0)
- * Club domestic league appearances and goals

William Woods was a former football (soccer) player who represented New Zealand at international level.

Woods made his full All Whites debut in a 5–6 loss to South Africa on 28 June 1947 and ended his international playing career with three A-international caps to his credit, his final cap an appearance in a 1–4 loss to South Africa on 17 July 1947.
