= 1954 Chatham Cup =

Tournament details
- Venue(s): Basin Reserve, Wellington
- Dates: 4 September 1954

Final positions
- Champions: Onehunga (1st title)
- Runners-up: Western

The 1954 Chatham Cup was the 27th annual nationwide knockout football competition in New Zealand.

The competition was run on a regional basis, with regional associations each holding separate qualifying rounds.

Teams taking part in the final rounds are known to have included Onehunga (Auckland), Eastern Union (Gisborne), Moturoa (New Plymouth), Napier Rovers, (Hawkes Bay), Wanganui Settlers (Wanganui), Kiwi United (Manawatu), Stop Out (Lower Hutt/Wellington), Woodbourne (Marlborough), Western (Christchurch), Northern (Dunedin), Brigadiers (Southland), Mangakino (Bay of Plenty), Millerton Thistle (Buller/West Coast).

== Controversial refereeing ==
Referee Morrie Swain was involved in an incident in an early round of the competition held in Wellington between Apollon and Zealandia. His decisions incensed one of the teams so much that he was chased from the field and had to take shelter by locking himself in a dressing room.

== Results ==
=== Quarterfinals ===
31 July 1954

| Northern | 2–1 | Brigadiers |

Caledonian Park, Dunedin
7 August 1954

| Millerton Thistle | 0–4 | Western |
|---|---|---|
| | Report | P. Saunderson, J. Longmuir, J. White, M. Shardlow |

Millerton, West Coast
7 August 1954

| Moturoa | 0–3 | Stop Out |
|---|---|---|
| | Report | T. Harrison 2, H. Schrijvers |

Western Park, New Plymouth
7 August 1954

| Eastern Union | 4–8 | Onehunga |

Childers Road Reserve, Gisborne

=== Semifinals ===
21 August 1954

| Onehunga | 3–2 | Stop Out |

Blandford Park, Auckland
21 August 1954

| Western | 2–0 | Northern |
|---|---|---|
| D. Mackie, J. Saunderson | Report |

English Park, Christchurch
Referee: Mr. R. Sloan (Oamaru)

=== Final ===
4 September 1954

| Onehunga | 1–0 | Western |
|---|---|---|
| McCullough |

Basin Reserve, Wellington
Referee: P. George
