= Merv Gordon =

New Zealand footballer

Personal information
- Full name: Mervin A Gordon
- Place of birth: New Zealand
- Position: Centre-half

Senior career*
Years	Team	Apps	(Gls)
- Western

International career
1936–1947	New Zealand	4	(0)
- * Club domestic league appearances and goals

Merv Gordon is a former association football player who represented New Zealand at international level.

Gordon made his full All Whites debut in a 1–7 loss to Australia on 4 July 1936 and ended his international playing career with four official caps to his credit, his final cap an appearance in a 1–4 loss to South Africa on 19 July 1947.
