= Edward Barton (priest) =

Edward Barton D.D. (7 July 1768 – 11 August 1848) was an Irish Anglican priest.

Barton was born in County Fermanagh and educated at Trinity College, Dublin, He was Archdeacon of Ferns from 1798 until his death.
