= Jack Hatchard =

New Zealand footballer

Personal information
- Full name: John Hebert Hatchard
- Place of birth: New Zealand

Senior career*
Years	Team	Apps	(Gls)
- Wellington Marist

International career
1936	New Zealand	1	(0)
- * Club domestic league appearances and goals

John Herbert Hatchard (28 January 1917 – 1984) was an association football player who represented New Zealand at international level.

Hatchard made a single appearance in an official international for the All Whites in a 1–7 loss to Australia on 4 July 1936.
