= Benge, Democratic Republic of the Congo =

Benge
- Village
- Location within Democratic Republic of the Congo
- Coordinates: 2.959581°N 25.778252°E
- Country: Democratic Republic of the Congo
- Province: Bas-Uélé
- Territory: Buta Territory
- Elevation: 609 m (1,998 ft)

Benge is a village in the Bas-Uélé province of the Democratic Republic of the Congo. It was a station on the defunct Vicicongo line, a railway.

== Location ==
Benge is in the Bas-Uélé province, Democratic Republic of the Congo. It is in extreme east of Buta Territory. It is in the 6,256 square kilometres (2,415 sq mi) chiefdom of Monganzulu. Benge is at an elevation of about 609 metres (1,998 ft) above sea level. A road leads east from the village to Zobia in Bambesa Territory.

== Colonial period ==
During the colonial period Benge was a chiefdom of the Mondingima tribe in the Zobia Territory. The main axis of the Vicicongo line built by the Société des Chemins de Fer Vicinaux du Congo ran east from ran from Andoma through Benge to Zobia. This section was opened in December 1932.

== Sources ==
- "Benge", Geonames
- Carte administrative du Territoire de Buta (PDF), CAID
- "Node: Benge (2131222604)", OpenStreetMap
- Omasombo Tshonda, Jean (2014), Bas-Uele Pouvoirs locaux et économie agricole : héritages d’un passé brouillé (PDF) (in French), Musée royal de l’Afrique centrale, ISBN 978-9-4916-1586-3
