= Onehunga Mangere United AFC =

Onehunga-Mangere United
- Full name: Onehunga Mangere United Association Football Club
- Nickname: O.M.
- Founded: 1921; 105 years ago (as Onehunga Methodist)
- Ground: Māngere Domain, Māngere Bridge, Auckland, New Zealand
- President: Suzanne Waddell
- Coach: Vacant
- League: Northern League
- 2026: NRFL Championship, 4th of 12 (promoted)
- Website: https://www.omuafc.org.nz/
Home colours	Away colours

Onehunga Mangere United is an association football club in Māngere Bridge, New Zealand. They currently compete in the Northern League.

== History ==
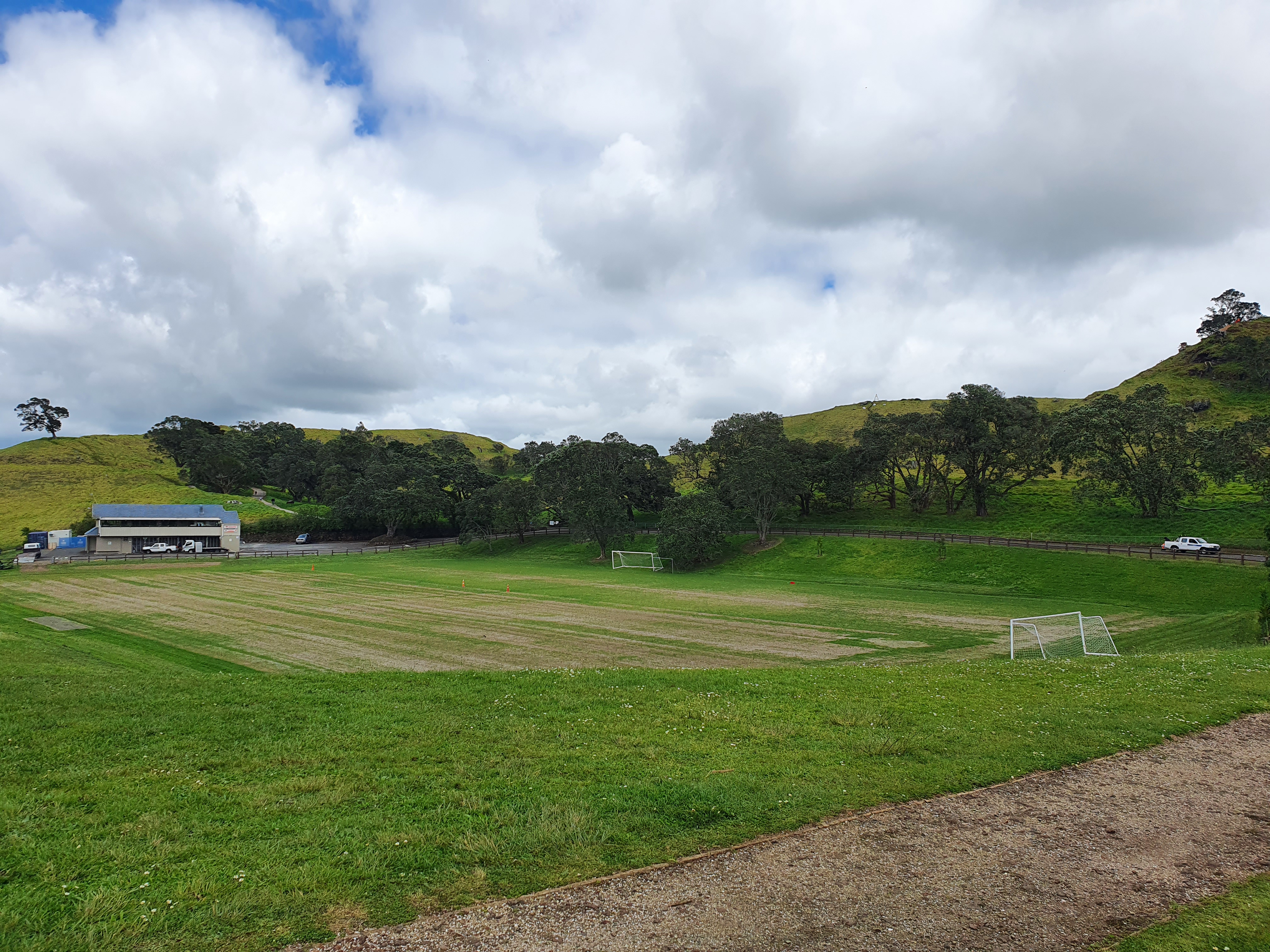
Sporting grounds on Māngere Mountain

The club was formed in 1921 as a sporting club for members of the Onehunga Methodist Church. In 1924, the decision was taken to rename as Onehunga Athletic Soccer Club and Waikaraka Park became their first home ground. In 1964 at the A.G.M. there was a suggestion that the club look seriously at incorporating the Māngere name as Onehunga Mangere United AFC. In 1965, the club took over the sporting grounds located at the base of Māngere Mountain in Māngere Bridge. The 1965 season saw the start of the new Northern League with Onehunga Mangere, the first of the new name, perched in the first division. The club relocated after being given permission by Auckland Council, to Mangere Domain where they remain to this day. The club won the Chatham Cup as Onehunga in 1954.

== See also ==
- Mangere United

== Honours ==
- Chatham Cup: 1954
- Auckland Football Association Division 1 Champions: 1956, 1958
- Northern League Division 2 Champions: 2021
- Northern League Division 3 Champions: 1984, 1999
- Northern League Division 4 North Champions: 1983

Chatham Cup
Preceded by Eastern Suburbs	Winner*; 1954 Chatham Cup	Succeeded by Western
