= Jack Sharp (New Zealand footballer) =

New Zealand footballer

Personal information
- Full name: Jack H Sharp
- Place of birth: New Zealand

Senior career*
Years	Team	Apps	(Gls)
1947–55	Stop Out		

International career
1947–1948	New Zealand	4	(0)
- * Club domestic league appearances and goals

Jack Sharp is a former football (soccer) player who represented New Zealand at international level.

Sharp made his full New Zealand debut in a 5–6 loss to South Africa on 28 June 1947 and ended his international playing career with four A-international caps to his credit, his final cap an appearance in a 0–6 loss to Australia on 14 August 1948.
