= 1946 Chatham Cup =

Tournament details
- Venue(s): Basin Reserve, Wellington
- Dates: 24 August 1946

Final positions
- Champions: Wellington Marist (2nd title)
- Runners-up: Christchurch Technical Old Boys

The 1946 Chatham Cup was the 19th annual nationwide knockout football competition in New Zealand.

The competition was run on a regional basis, with regional associations each holding separate qualifying rounds. Teams taking part in the final rounds are known to have included Wellington Marist, Metro College (Auckland), Wanganui Old Boys, St. Andrews (Manawatu), Technical Old Boys (Christchurch), and Mosgiel.

== The 1946 final ==
Wellington Marist's Jack Duffy was the only player to play in both the 1946 final and the 1932 final, Marist's previous Chatham Cup win. The 1946 team also contained three members of the Nunns family: Ces, Des, and Ray Nunns. Marist dominated the final, but it was Tech who took the lead in front of a crowd of 8000, with Cyril Thomas scoring during the first half. Jack Hatchard levelled for Marist before the break, then took the lead early in the second half through Henry Bell.

== Results ==
=== Quarter-finals ===
20 July 1946
Otago/Southland Final

Mosgiel	6 - 0	Invercargill Boys Brigade Old Boys

Logan Park, Dunedin
20 July 1946
Canterbury Final

Christchurch Technical Old Boys	5 - 1	Nomads

English Park, Christchurch
3 August 1946
Auckland/South Auckland (Waikato) Final

Rotowaro Tigers	1 - 2	Metro College

Seddon Park, Hamilton
3 August 1946
Wellington/Wanganui Final

Wellington Marist	8 - 0	Wanganui Technical Old Boys

Basin Reserve, Wellington

=== Semi-finals ===
North Island Final
10 August 1946

Wellington Marist	3 – 2	Metro College

Basin Reserve, Wellington
South Island Final
10 August 1946

Christchurch Technical Old Boys	5 - 3	Mosgiel

English Park, Christchurch

=== Final ===
1946 Chatham Cup Final
24 August 1946

Wellington Marist	2 – 1	Christchurch Technical Old Boys
Hatchard, Bell		Thomas

Basin Reserve, Wellington
Referee: T.G. Chapman
