= 1945 Chatham Cup =

Tournament details
- Venue(s): Basin Reserve, Wellington
- Dates: 1 September 1945

Final positions
- Champions: Western (2nd title)
- Runners-up: Wellington Marist

The 1945 Chatham Cup was the 18th nationwide knockout football competition in New Zealand, and the first such competition after a four-year gap caused by World War II.

The competition was run on a regional basis, with regional associations each holding separate qualifying rounds. Teams taking part in the final rounds are known to have included Wellington Marist, St. Andrews (Manawatu), Western (Christchurch), and Mosgiel.

== The 1945 final ==
In the final, Jack Smith scored a hat-trick, including one goal from the penalty spot. Merv Gordon's own goal is the first to be definitively recorded as such in a Chatham Cup final, though some goals in earlier finals are regarded as own goals in some publications. The game is noted as an exciting one, especially the second half. The only goal of the first half came after 17 minutes from Marist's G. Irvine. The lead became 2–0 twenty minutes into the second half through Ray Price, only for Western to score twice, the second goal coming only one minute before the whistle. In extra time Gordon's own goal was nullified by an equaliser from Ray Dowker before Smith hit the winner from the penalty spot.

== Results ==
=== Quarter-finals ===
28 July 1945
South Auckland (Waikato) Final

Glen Massey	1 - 6	Rotowaro Tigers
	Report

Seddon Park, Hamilton
11 August 1945
Wellington Final

Wellington Marist	5 - 0	Stop Out

Basin Reserve, Wellington
11 August 1945
Canterbury Final

Western	4 - 3	Christchurch Thistle

Hagley Park, Christchurch
11 August 1945
Otago Final

Roslyn-Wakari	2 - 4	Mosgiel

Kensington Oval, Dunedin

=== Semi-finals ===
South Island Final
18 August 1945

Mosgiel	3 - 7	Western

Caledonian Park, Dunedin
North Island Final
18 August 1945

Rotowaro Tigers	2 - 2 replayed	Wellington Marist

Blandford Park, Auckland
North Island Final (replay)
21 August 1945

Rotowaro Tigers	0 - 2	Wellington Marist

Blandford Park, Auckland
Referee: Mr. F. O. Green

=== Final ===
1945 Chatham Cup Final
1 September 1945

Western	4 – 3 (aet)	Wellington Marist
J. Smith 3 (1 pen), Dowker		Irvine, Price, Gordon (og)

Basin Reserve, Wellington
Referee: Mr. V. Wheeler
