= 1950 Chatham Cup =

Tournament details
- Venue(s): Basin Reserve, Wellington
- Dates: 2 September 1950

Final positions
- Champions: Eden (1st title)
- Runners-up: Technical Old Boys

The 1950 Chatham Cup was the 23rd annual nationwide knockout football competition in New Zealand.

The competition was run on a regional basis, with regional associations each holding separate qualifying rounds. Teams taking part in the final rounds are known to have included Eden, Eastern Suburbs (Auckland), Claudelands Rovers, Rotowaro Tigers (Hamilton), Runanga (West Coast), Denniston (Buller), Moturoa (Taranaki), Wanganui Technical Old Boys (Wanganui), Ohakea (Manawatu), Institute Old Boys, Wellington Marist (Wellington), Technical Old Boys, Wigram (Christchurch), Brigadiers (Southland) and Northern (Dunedin).

== The 1950 final ==
Eden took the cup back to Auckland for the first time in 16 years. In the final, played in front of a crowd of 11,000, the first half contained one goal for each side. Tech's Cyril Thomas was the first on the scoresheet, but Eden levelled when Peter Goddard's shot was deflected off a Tech defender. In the second spell, John Jakens put Eden into the lead after concerted pressure in the first few minutes, but Technical came back strongly and equalised via Vic Smith (some reports credit the goal to Colin Bailey). The southern side had a chance to regain the lead in the first period of extra time from the spot, but the penalty miss proved costly and Eden took advantage, finding the winner when Don Brewer deflected a Goddard cross into the Tech goalmouth.

== Results ==
=== Quarter Finals ===
29 July 1950

Claudelands Rovers	2 - 4	Eden

Seddon Park, Hamilton
5 August 1950

Institute Old Boys	4 - 0	Wanganui Technical Old Boys

Basin Reserve, Wellington
9 July 1950

Northern	5 - 0	Brigadiers
W. Berry ×2, A. Warke ×2, A. Jenkins	Report

Caledonian Ground, Dunedin
22 July 1950

Runanga	3 - 4 aet	Technical Old Boys
Glen, Scott ×2	Report	O'Malley, McLennan, Bailey, Lucas

Runanga Domain, West Coast Region

=== Semi Finals ===
12 August 1950

Technical Old Boys	3 - 2 aet	Northern
Bailey ×2, McLennan	Report	Berry, McDonald

English Park, Christchurch
Referee: Mr. R. Scott (Wellington)
19 August 1950

Eden	3 - 0	Institute Old Boys

Blandford Park, Auckland
Referee: Mr. A. Thompson (Wanganui)

=== Final ===
2 September 1950

Eden	3 – 2 (aet)	Technical Old Boys
Goddard, Jakens, Brewer	Report	Thomas, Smith

Basin Reserve, Wellington
Referee: Mr. W.M. Smith (Otago)
