= Fred Benge =

New Zealand footballer

Personal information
- Full name: Fred J Benge
- Place of birth: New Zealand

Senior career*
Years	Team	Apps	(Gls)
- Stop Out

International career
1954	New Zealand	3	(0)
- * Club domestic league appearances and goals

Fred J Benge was an association football player who represented New Zealand at international level.

Benge played three official A-international matches for New Zealand in 1954, all against trans-Tasman neighbours Australia, the first a 2–1 win on 14 August, followed by consecutive 1–4 losses on 28 August and 4 September respectively. Including unofficial matches Benge played 14 games for New Zealand between 1954 and 1957.
