= 1948 Chatham Cup =

Tournament details
- Venue(s): Basin Reserve, Wellington
- Dates: 21 August 1948

Final positions
- Champions: Technical Old Boys (1st title)
- Runners-up: Waterside (Wellington)

The 1948 Chatham Cup was the 21st annual nationwide knockout football competition in New Zealand.

The competition was run on a regional basis, with regional associations each holding separate qualifying rounds. Teams taking part in the final rounds are known to have included Eastern Suburbs (Auckland), Waterside (Wellington), Technical Old Boys (Christchurch), and Roslyn-Wakari (Dunedin).

== The 1948 final ==
The final was a re-match of the previous years' final, with Technical Old Boys gaining revenge over Waterside for their loss of the previous year. The Waterside team proved disappointing when compared to their team of the previous year, and it was Tech who dominated. Though the Wharfies held the Canterbury side to a 0-0 half-time score, they succumbed in the second half to goals by Peter O'Malley and Cyril Thomas.

== Results ==
24 July 1948

Roslyn-Wakari	3–6	Brigadiers
Smyth, Ness (pen.), Garrick	Report	R. Morrison 2 (1 pen.), Ottley, Olley, Wilson, N. Morrison

Culling Park, Dunedin
Referee: Mr. W. Dodd

=== Semi-finals ===
31 July 1948

Rotowaro	0–1	Waterside (Wellington)
	Report	Walker

Seddon Park, Hamilton
31 July 1948

Technical Old Boys	4–0	Brigadiers
C. Bailey 3, Grieve	Report

English Park, Christchurch
Referee: Mr. C. Sweeney

=== Final ===
21 August 1948

Technical Old Boys	2–0	Waterside (Wellington)
O'Malley, Thomas

Basin Reserve, Wellington
Referee: A. Aspen
