= Waikato United FC =

- Full name: Waikato United Football Club
- Nickname: Waikato
- Founded: 1986 (as AFC Waikato)
- Ground: Muir Park

Waikato United was an association football club in Waikato, New Zealand.

== History ==
Waikato United was formed in 1986. It was initially named AFC Waikato and came about through the amalgamation of AFC Hamilton with support from Hamilton Wanderers FC and Claudelands Rovers FC. In 1988 the name was changed to Waikato United.

When formed Waikato took over Claudland Rovers' position in 1986's Northern League Division One. The club won the division in its first season. This saw the club gain promotion to the Northern Premier League. In the Chatham Cup The club was eliminated away 2–1 by Oratia United in the third round.

The 1987 season saw Waikato play in the Northern Premier League for the only time in its existence. The club played very well and won the completion in their first attempt. This enabled the team to enter New Zealand's premier football league competition, the Winfield National League. Sadly they were a non event in the Chatham Cup getting knocked out very early on.

1988 was to be an eventful year for the club, which had now modified its name to Waikato United, dropping the AFC. This was its first year in the National League, finishing a credible 5th. More importantly the club embarked on a successful run in New Zealand sport's oldest knockout competition, the Chatham Cup.

The club had an easy run through to the semifinal where it was drawn away to Wellington United. The game finished 0–0 after extra time but Waikato managed to go on and win the penalty shootout 3–0. At this time the Chatham Cup final was played on a home and away basis. Christchurch United also qualified for the final and hosted the first match. The final score being 2–2. The return was played at home at Muir Park. The final result was 1–1. This made Waikato champions based on away goals.

1989 proved to be a quieter year for the club only finishing 8th in the National league and played poorly in their third round match away to Mount Albert-Ponsonby, losing 1–0.

The new decade looked promising for Waikato. The club had a resurgent season, finishing the National League in fourth place, two points behind Christchurch United. In the Chatham Cup the club had an improved run, being knocked out by eventual champions Mount Wellington away 2–1 in the quarter-finals.

This form was carried through into 1991 where the club improved its league position finishing third behind Christchurch United (1st) and Mirimar Rangers. It did not fare as well in the previous in the Chatham Cup being knocked out by rivals Mount Maunganui away at Links Avenue 3–0 in the fifth round. In the previous round Waikato had beaten Blockhouse Bay 7–0 at home.

1992 was a heartbreak year for the club. Financial problems were starting to affect club football in New Zealand and this was to be the last year of the National League's classic format, bringing to an end New Zealand's oldest established sports league in its traditional sense. Waikato performed exceptionally in the league, finishing second behind Waitakere City F.C. on 57 points (4 less than the champions). The club only lost 5 times and scored a total of 67 goals in 26 games, finishing with a positive goal difference of 47. The club performed in the Chatham Cup too, making it to the final, eliminating Waitakere City F.C. (away) and Christchurch United (home) in the process. The final was played against Mirimar Rangers at the Basin Reserve where Mirimar came out on top 3–1 with Waikato favourite Darren Fellowes and future Mirimar All White Vaughan Coveny both scoring.

With the collapse of the National League, 1993 saw a new competition take its place, The Superclub Competition. This was designed to keep the leagues costs down and saw three regional pools being created: Northern, Central and Southern. The existing teams from the National league were included along with the best finishers in the area's top local competitions. Waikato finished the Northern pool in second place, again behind Waitakere City, although this time only losing 2 games. This meant the club qualified for the national part of the tournament where the top 3 clubs from the Northern and Central regions and two from the Southern played each other once either home or away. Waikato finished third with 3 wins and 2 draws from 7 games. The top four (1: Waitakere, 2: Napier City Rovers, 3: Waikato, 4: North Shore United) were entered into a playoff with 1v2 and 3v4 with the winner of 1v2 going to the final while the loser played off against the winner of 3v4 for the other final place. Waikato played North Shore at home but managed to lose 1–0. Napier lost the other playoff heavily 4–1 meaning that it hosted the final playoff at home against North Shore. It won this game 1–0 and met Waitakere again in the final which was played at Bill McKinlay Park, Auckland. After scores being tied at 3–3 after normal time, Perry Cotton scored what proved to be the winner for Napier, clinching it 4–3 in extra time. Waikato did not perform so well in the Chatham Cup, being eliminated away to Pakuranga Town in the fourth round 2–1. The Chatham Cup final was notable in the Napier also won this competition, incredibly winning 6–0 over Rangers A.F.C. at McLean Park.

In 1994 the club finished 6th in the Northern pool and thus missing out on national football. In the Chatham Cup it was knocked out at home in a memorable game against Central United in the third round. The game went through to penalties after the extra time score finishing 5–5. Central held its nerve and won 5–4 on penalties.

After the disappointing season that was 1994, 1995 was to see a resurgence in Waikato's fortunes. The club recruited well and some of its key players who had been out injured returned to the club Delcan Edge and Darren Fellows. The club performed well in the Northern pool of the Superclub, finishing third on 35 points, qualifying them for the National League where then again finished third. This qualified them for the 3v4 playoff that was hosted at Muir Park against Napier. Waikato came out on top 1–0. This qualified them for the final playoff spot away ro North Shore United. It was a tight game with Waikato equalising the game near the end of normal time 1–1. Extra time passed with no goals leading to a penalty shootout, won by Waikato 5–4 and thus qualifying for the final. This was seen by many Waikato fans as payback for being knocked out of the Chatham Cup The final was again played at Bill McKinlay Park against Waitakere who had also qualified for the final. It turned out be a one sided affair with Waitakere winning the game 4–0 and thus becoming the last Superclub winners. In the Chatham Cup Waikato made it to the fifth round after wins against Tauranga City and local rival and future merge partner Melville. They hosted North Shore in the 5th round but lost 3–1 at home.

1996 would prove to be the end of the road for Waikato United. The Superclub competition was axed and was replaced by a new league. This league was innovative in that instead of being played in winter was brought forward to a January start date and the clubs involved were invited to take part, there was no promotion or relegation. It was called the National Summer Soccer League.

Waikato did not carry its form through from the previous season which had only ended two months earlier for Waikato (the Superclub final was 4 November). It could only manage a lowly 8th place (out of 10) and ended up a goal difference of −14, the club's worst in its history. Outside of football the club ran into national attention through in an incident following an away trip to Woolston Technical in February. On the Eagle Airways flight back to Hamilton an unnamed player decided to run naked on the plane. The escapade cost the club $4000. The club's most successful striker this season, Darren Brown ended up 3rd in the leagues golden boot standings with 13 goals.

Following the conclusion of the season Soccer New Zealand announced that for each club to be able to continue in the competition it had to have male and female junior and senior sides, something which Waikato had never had been a one team club. Avenues to address this were sort and an amalgamation with Melville to form Melville United were agreed upon (United being added to Melville as indicator of the amalgamation). Muir park was sold to a developer and the funds generated were put aside for the construction of a new top level Waiakato football ground (as of 2021 this has still yet to happen). Waikato United's swansong came about in their final game which was also their final appearance in the Chatham Cup. The club was seeded through to the 4th round where then were drawn to play against local Waikato side Ngaruawahia United. The amalgamation with Melville was still in process as the club had to play but all its players had moved on so a team of retirees took to the field in Ngāruawāhia. They held their own briefly but the difference in fitness and age soon told and Waikato went on to lose its very final game 8–0, producing the club's worst ever defeat to a team it would normally walk through.

Melville and Waikato were officially amalgamated by November 2006, in time for the start of the National Summer League.

== All time records ==
- Record Victory:
- Record Defeat: 0–8 vs Ngaruawahia United (A), 1996
- Highest Scoring:
- Highest League Crowd:
- Lowest League Crowd:
- Winning Streak:
- Undefeated Streak:
- Losing Streak:
- Winless Streak:
- Goals in a game:
- Goals in a season:
- Most Assists in a season: ?
- All-time most Appearances:
- All-time Top Scorer:

== Football League history ==
=== Northern League 1986–1987 ===
Division One

| Season | Position | GP | W | D | L | GF | GA | GD | Pts | Best Result | Worst Result |
|---|---|---|---|---|---|---|---|---|---|---|---|
| 1986 | 1 | 18 | 14 | 1 | 3 | 56 | 19 | +37 | 43 | 9–0 Manukau City | 0–2 Oratia United |

Premier Division

| Season | Position | GP | W | D | L | GF | GA | GD | Pts | Best Result | Worst Result |
|---|---|---|---|---|---|---|---|---|---|---|---|
| 1987 | 1 | 26 | 15 | 8 | 3 | 54 | 20 | +34 | 53 | 5–0 East Coast Bays & Hamilton Wanderers | 1–2 Oratia United |

=== National League 1988–1992 ===
| Season | Position | GP | W | D | L | GF | GA | GD | Pts | Best Result | Worst Result |
|---|---|---|---|---|---|---|---|---|---|---|---|
| 1988 | 5 | 26 | 11 | 5 | 10 | 39 | 30 | +9 | 38 | 4–0 North Shore United & Papatoetoe | 0–3 Miramar Rangers & Mount Wellington |
| 1989 | 8 | 26 | 8 | 11 | 7 | 31 | 31 | 0 | 35 | 4–1 Hutt Valley United | 0–3 Manurewa & Napier City Rovers |
| 1990 | 4 | 26 | 14 | 5 | 7 | 44 | 31 | +13 | 47 | 5–2 Gisborne City | 0–3 Napier City Rovers |
| 1991 | 3 | 26 | 13 | 8 | 5 | 49 | 26 | +23 | 47 | 5–0 Gisborne City | 0–3 Napier City Rovers |
| 1992 | 2 | 26 | 18 | 3 | 5 | 67 | 20 | +47 | 57 | 9–0 New Plymouth Rangers | 3–2 Hutt Valley United |

- Each season had 14 teams.

=== Superclub Championship 1993–1996 ===
Northern Pool

| Season | Position | GP | W | D | L | GF | GA | GD | Pts | Qual. Nationals | Best Result | Worst Result |
|---|---|---|---|---|---|---|---|---|---|---|---|---|
| 1993 | 2 | 18 | 11 | 5 | 2 | 45 | 19 | +26 | 38 | Yes | 6–0 Manurewa | 0–3 North Shore |
| 1994 | 6 | 18 | 5 | 5 | 8 | 33 | 39 | -6 | 20 | No | 4–0 Oratia United | 1–4 Papatoetoe |
| 1995 | 3 | 18 | 11 | 2 | 5 | 47 | 16 | +31 | 35 | Yes | 6–0 Mt Albert & Papatoetoe | 0–2 Mt Maunganui |

National League

| Season | Position | GP | W | D | L | GF | GA | GD | Pts | Finals | Best Result | Worst Result |
|---|---|---|---|---|---|---|---|---|---|---|---|---|
| 1993 | 3 | 7 | 3 | 2 | 2 | 10 | 9 | +1 | 11 | Yes | 3–0 Wellington Olympic | 0–3 Waitakere City FC |
| 1995 | 3 | 7 | 3 | 2 | 2 | 11 | 8 | +3 | 11 | Yes | 5–1 Woolston | 0–2 Waitakere City FC |

Finals

1993

Playoff

3 October 1993

| Waikato United | 0–1 | North Shore United |
|---|---|---|
| | | Stevens |

1995

Playoffs

22 October 1995

| Waikato United | 1–0 | Napier City Rovers |

27 October 1995

| North Shore United | 1 – 1 (aet)* | Waikato United |

*Waikato United won 5–4 on penalties

Final

4 November 1995

| Waitakere City | 4–0 | Waikato United |
|---|---|---|
| Jorgensen, Gray, McClennan, T Edge |

Bill McKinlay Park, Auckland

=== All-time League records ===
| Club | Pld | W | D | L | GF | GA | GD |
|---|---|---|---|---|---|---|---|
| Christchurch United | 10 | | | | | | |
| Mount Wellington | | | | | | | |
| Mount Maunganui | | | | | | | |
| Napier City Rovers | | | | | | | |
| North Shore United | | | | | | | |
| Wellington United | | | | | | | |
| New Plymouth Rangers | | | | | | | |
| Gisborne City | | | | | | | |
| Woolston | 3 | 2 | 0 | 1 | 9 | 3 | +6 |
| Waitakere City FC | | | | | | | |
| Wellington Olympic | | | | | | | |
| Mount Albert-Ponsonby | | | | | | | |
| Manukau City | | | | | | | |
| Oratia United | | | | | | | |
| East Coast Bays | | | | | | | |
| Papatoetoe AFC | | | | | | | |
| Hamilton Wanderers | | | | | | | |
| Miramar Rangers | | | | | | | |
| Manurewa AFC | | | | | | | |
| Hutt Valley United | | | | | | | |
| Waterside Karori | | | | | | | |
| Nelson United | | | | | | | |
| Manawatu AFC | | | | | | | |
| Christchurch Rangers | | | | | | | |
| Central United | | | | | | | |
| Roslyn Waikari | | | | | | | |
| Wanganui East Athletic | | | | | | | |
| Ellerslie AFC | | | | | | | |
| Christchurch Technical | | | | | | | |
| Nelson Suburbs | 2 | 0 | 0 | 2 | 4 | 8 | −4 |
| Total | | | | | | | |

== Managers ==
| Name | Nat | From | To | Record | | | | | | | |
| Name | Nat | From | To | P | W | D | L | F | A | GD | Pts |
|---|---|---|---|---|---|---|---|---|---|---|---|
| Roger Wilkinson | (England) | | | | | | | | | | |
| Total | | 1986 | 1996 | | | | | | | | |

== Player records ==
=== Most appearances ===
| # | Name | Kingz Career | Appearances | Goals |
|---|---|---|---|---|
| 1 | (New Zealand) Paul Gemmell | | 231 | 6 |
| | (New Zealand) Darren Fellowes | | 130 | 87 |
| | (New Zealand) Mark Cossey | | | |
| | (New Zealand) Jonathan Perry | | | |
| | (New Zealand) Paul Halford | | | |
| | (New Zealand) Che Bunce | | | |
| | (New Zealand) Declan Edge | | | |
| | (New Zealand) Darren Melville | | | |
| | (New Zealand) Brian Hayes | | | |
| | (New Zealand) Brian Chisholm | | | |

=== Most goals ===
| # | Name | Waikato Career | Goals | Appearances |
|---|---|---|---|---|
| 1 | (New Zealand) Darren Fellowes | | 87 | 130 |
| | (New Zealand) Mark Cossey | | | |
| | (New Zealand) Declan Edge | | | |
| | (New Zealand) Darren Brown | | | |
| | (New Zealand) [[ {{{last}}}]] | | | |
| | (New Zealand) [[ {{{last}}}]] | | | |

== See also ==
- National League
- Northern League
- Chatham Cup
- New Zealand Football
- Melville United

Chatham Cup
| Preceded by Gisborne City | Winner; 1988 Chatham Cup | Succeeded by Christchurch United |
