= Burnside A.F.C. =

- Full name: Burnside Association Football Club
- Founded: 1967
- Ground: Burnside Park, Christchurch
- Coach: (New Zealand) Don Saxon
Home colours

Burnside A.F.C. was an association football club based in the suburb of Burnside in Christchurch, New Zealand. They merged with Avon United in 2011 to form FC Twenty 11.

In 2007 it was the largest football club in the South Island.

== Club history ==
Founded in 1967 as Burndale United (the name being a portmanteau of the suburb names Burnside and Bishopdale), the name was changed first to Burnside United and then simply to Burnside A.F.C. The club's colours of claret and blue reflect those of founding secretary Terry McIntyre's favourite team, West Ham United.

Burnside A.F.C. originally played home matches at Burnside Park. Sometime before 2000, they began to play at a variety of parks, including Burnside, Jellie Park, Avonhead Park and Ray Blank Park.

In 2004, 2005 and 2006 Burnside were the 'Mainland Premier Qualifying League' champions.

In 2011 Burnside AFC merged with local rivals Avon United to form FC Twenty 11.
