= Wellington Marist =

Association football club

Wellington Marist AFC
- Full name: Wellington Marist Association Football Club
- Founded: 1896 (football in 1902)
- Ground: Kilbirnie Park, Wellington
- Chairman: Mark Lavery
- Manager: Graeme Davidson
- League: Capital Premier
- 2026: Capital Premier, 5th of 10

Wellington Marist AFC is an association football club in Wellington, New Zealand. The club competes in the Capital Premier. The team is based at Kilbirnie Park in Kilbirnie.

== History ==
Marist A.F.C. is one of the oldest football clubs in Wellington, having won the Chatham Cup in 1932 and 1946, and were runners-up in 1945. The team's home ground is at Kilbirnie Park in Wellington, also having training facilities at Melrose Park. Marist has teams in grades from Capital Division 2 right through to Capital 13 and Masters grades for the over 35 players.

== Honours ==
=== Men's ===
- Capital Division 1

Winners (2): 2001, 2009

- Chatham Cup

Winners (2): 1932, 1946

=== Women's ===
- Central Premier Women's League

Winners (2): 2005, 2009, 2010

- Kelly Cup

Winners (2): 1995, 2010

Chatham Cup
Preceded by Tramurewa	Winner; 1932 Chatham Cup	Succeeded by Ponsonby
Preceded by Western	Winner; 1946 Chatham Cup	Succeeded by Waterside
