= Petone FC =

- Full name: Petone Football Club
- Nickname: The Settlers
- Founded: 1898 (as Petone AFC)
- Ground: Memorial Park, Petone
- Chairman: Matt Bliss
- Manager: Sam Pickering
- League: Central League
- 2026: Central League, 8th of 10
- Website: www.petonefootball.org.nz
Home colours	Away colours

Petone FC is an association football club in Petone, New Zealand. The club provides football for men, women and children. The club's men's first team competes in the Central League with the women's first team competing in the Women's Central League. The club is based at Memorial Park in the Lower Hutt suburb of Petone.

== History and achievements ==
The club is the successor for Petone United, a club founded in 1889 as Petone Wanderers before merging with the Wellington Rowing Club in 1892, competing under the name United until disbandment in 1895.

The club has won the Chatham Cup three times (1928, 1930, and 1949) and won the Central League title in 1990.

Petone FC was originally known at Petone Association Football Club, however the club was renamed Petone Soccer Club in 1994. In 2009, club management voted to rename the club as Petone Football Club.

== 2025 squad ==
Note: Flags indicate national team as defined under FIFA eligibility rules; some limited exceptions apply. Players may hold more than one non-FIFA nationality.

No.	Pos.	Nation	Player
1	GK	NZL	Shea Stapleton
2	DF	NZL	Finn O'Connor
3	DF	NZL	Nicholas Drayton
5	DF	NZL	Jaga Scott-Greenfield (vice-captain)
5	FW	NZL	Kieran McMinn
6	MF	NZL	Amir Mandalawi
8	DF	NZL	Seth Loughran
9	MF	NZL	Cameron Healy
10	MF	NZL	Hami Paranihi-Nuku
11	FW	NZL	Bray Whitecliffe
11	FW	SDN	Nathaniel Hailemariam
12	GK	NZL	Luca Siegel

No.	Pos.	Nation	Player
14	MF	NZL	Matthew Beaton
15	DF	NZL	Jeremy George
16	MF	NZL	Oliver Pickering
16	FW	NZL	Liam Shearer
18	DF	NZL	Sean Matthews
19	MF	NZL	Joshua Apaapa-Preston
20	MF	ENG	Michael Des Tombe
21	FW	NZL	Samuel Pickering
23	MF	NZL	Ali Nazari
23	FW	NZL	Matthew Brazier
24	FW	NZL	Jack O'Connor

== 2025 staff ==
- Head coach: Jamie O'Connor
- Assistant coaches: Sam Morrissey

== Major honours ==
- Central League
  - Winners (1): 1990
- Capital Premier
  - Winners (3): 2006, 2007, 2019
- Chatham Cup
  - Winners (3): 1928, 1930, 1949

Chatham Cup
Preceded by Ponsonby	Winner; 1928 Chatham Cup	Succeeded by Tramways
Preceded by Tramways	Winner; 1930 Chatham Cup	Succeeded by Tramurewa
Preceded by Christchurch Technical Old Boys	Winner; 1949 Chatham Cup	Succeeded by Eden
