= Western A.F.C. =

Western
- Full name: Western Association Football Club
- Nickname: The Dub
- Founded: 1913
- Ground: Westminster Park, Christchurch
- Coach: Rob Stanton
- League: Canterbury Premiership
- 2026: Canterbury Premiership, 8th of 10
- Website: http://www.westernafc.com
Home colours	Away colours

Western A.F.C. is a semi-professional association football club in Christchurch, New Zealand. They compete in the Canterbury Premiership.

In June 1961, the club announced it had purchased its own ground in St. Albans for a cost of £1500.

== Honours ==
- Canterbury Championship League: 2018, 2021

Women's

- Mainland Women's Premier League: 2009
- Mainland Football Women's Team of the Year: 2009
- McFarlane Cup (Men's): 2012

Chatham Cup
Preceded by Hospital	Winner; 1936 Chatham Cup	Succeeded by 1937 Competition cancelled due to lack of entries 1938 Waterside
Preceded by WWII competition had stopped	Winner; 1945 Chatham Cup	Succeeded by Wellington Marist
Preceded by Eastern Suburbs	Shared with North Shore United*; 1952 Chatham Cup	Succeeded by Eastern Suburbs
Preceded by Onehunga	Winner; 1955 Chatham Cup	Succeeded by Stop Out
