= Three Kings United =

Association football club in Auckland, New Zealand

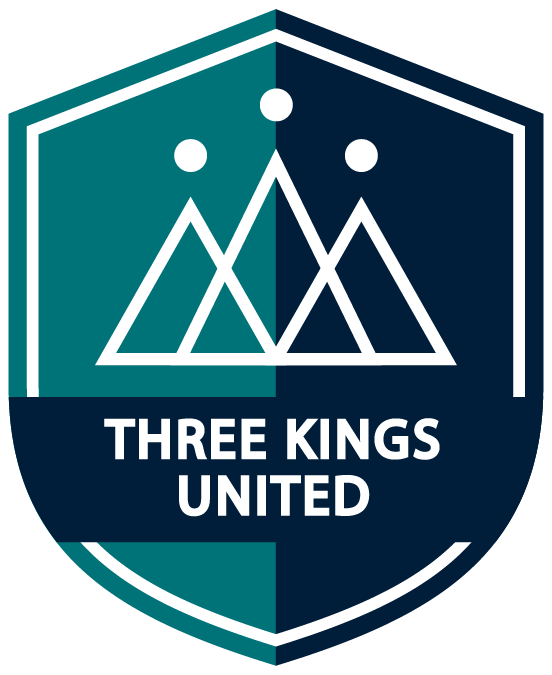
- Full name: Three Kings United Football Club
- Founded: 1997; 29 years ago
- Ground: Keith Hay Park, Mount Roskill, Auckland
- Chairman: Murray Holdaway
Home colours	Away colours

Three Kings United Football Club is a youth football club based in Three Kings, Auckland, New Zealand. They previously competed in the Lotto Sport Italia NRFL Division 1, with their last appearance coming in 2019.

In 2020, Three Kings United merged with Onehunga Sports to form Auckland United, which assumed Onehunga's position in the 2020 NRFL Premier season; the club's youth and social sectors remain in operation.

Three Kings' home ground is Keith Hay Park, with a number of other parks used around central Auckland.

== Club history ==
The club was founded in 1997 through the amalgamation of Eden AFC (founded 1947) and Mount Roskill AFC (founded 1954). In 1994, Eden had merged with YMCA Grafton, a club with an illustrious history. YMCA Grafton was founded in 1985 as a merger between Grafton Rovers and Auckland YMCA, the latter of these teams having been a major team in the early days of organised football in Auckland. Auckland YMCA reached the semi-finals of the national knockout Chatham Cup in 1928, and are also known to have reached the later stages of the competition in 1932.

Three Kings United are one of 31 member clubs of the Auckland Football Federation.

== Senior men's team ==
TKU's men's team were finalists in the 2009 Chatham Cup, New Zealand's principal knockout cup competition, and currently play in the Northern Region Premier League. Both Eden and Mount Roskill were former winners of both competitions. Eden won the Chatham Cup in 1950 and the Northern League in 1974; Mount Roskill won the 1964 Chatham Cup, and the 1989 Northern League.

== Women's senior team ==
TKU's women's team is particularly strong, providing many players for the New Zealand national team at age-grade and full international level. Eight of the 21 New Zealand women's national under-20 football team squad members for the 2010 FIFA U-20 Women's World Cup were Three Kings United players.

== Honours ==
Chatham Cup
Preceded by Petone	Winner*; 1950 Chatham Cup	Succeeded by Eastern Suburbs
Preceded by North Shore United	Winner†; 1964 Chatham Cup	Succeeded by Eastern Suburbs

Kate Sheppard Cup
Preceded by Lynn-Avon United	Winner; 1997 Women's Knockout Cup	Succeeded by Three Kings United
Preceded by Three Kings United	Winner; 1998 Women's Knockout Cup	Succeeded by Three Kings United
Preceded by Three Kings United	Winner; 1999 Women's Knockout Cup	Succeeded by Lynn-Avon United
Preceded by Glenfield Rovers	Winner; 2012 Women's Knockout Cup	Succeeded by Coastal Spirit
