= Avon United =

Avon United F.C.
- Full name: Avon United Football Club
- Nickname(s): The Shamrocks
- Founded: 1995
- Ground: Avonhead Park, Christchurch
- League: defunct
| Home colours | Away colours |

Avon United Football Club was a New Zealand amateur football club based in the city of Christchurch.

The club was based in the western part of Christchurch and draw most of their players from Avonhead, Riccarton, Burnside, Fendalton, Ilam, Bryndwr and Hornby. The club rooms are situated at Riccarton Domain on Yaldhurst Road.

The club consists of around 550 junior players (boys and girls) with grades from Midget (approx 5 years) all the way to Premier Youth (under 19). There are also 10 senior men's and women's teams, with the top teams playing in the highest local leagues.

The club's colours consist of green and black with white highlights, currently the club does not have an away kit. The club's main kit supplier is currently Lotto.

== History ==
Avon United F.C. was founded after the merger of Shamrock and Riccarton clubs in 1995. After suffering relegation from the MPL in 2007 (after the team's best points total ever in the top flight) Avon have been a top two side in division 1 and are consistently pushing for promotion back into the MPL.

In 2011 Avon United merged with Burnside A.F.C. to form FC Twenty 11
