= 1933 Chatham Cup =

Tournament details
- Venue(s): Basin Reserve, Wellington
- Dates: 26 August 1933

Final positions
- Champions: Ponsonby (2nd title)
- Runners-up: Millerton All Blacks

The 1933 Chatham Cup was the 11th annual nationwide knockout football competition in New Zealand.

The competition was run on a regional basis, with eight regional associations (Auckland, Walkato, Wellington, Manawatu, Buller, Westland, Canterbury, and Otago) each holding separate qualifying rounds.

Auckland's YMCA entered the cup in late May only to withdraw a week later.

An entry from the Poverty Bay Football Association (PBFA) was withdrawn in late June after a meeting of the executive in Gisborne.

Following the Wellington region semi-final fixture between Waterside v Swifts, a protest from the Swifts in regard to the ineligibility of Waterside player, Baistow was lodged with, and later upheld by the NZFA, the match was replayed as a result.

Maori Hill in mid July expressed concern about the potential travel arrangements and costs if drawn to play its next fixture on the West Coast.

Teams taking part included: Ponsonby, Tramways (Auckland), Huntly Thistle, Hamilton Wanderers, Rotowaro (Waikato) St. Andrews, Athletic (Manawatu), Woollen Mills (Whanganui), Hospital, Lower Hutt, Wellington Marist, Petone, Swifts, Seatoun, Waterside (Wellington) Linwood, Nomads, Rangers, St. Alban's, Christchurch Thistle, Western, Technical Old Boys (Canterbury) Millerton All Blacks, Denniston Celtic, Thistle (Buller), Dobson, Cobden, Taylorville, Greymouth (Westland) Maori Hill, Northern (Dunedin)

== The 1933 final ==
Ponsonby won their second title, having previously held the cup in 1927. John Morrison and Bob Innes were the only two players to have been in both winning teams. Millerton reached the final for the second consecutive time, but again finished runners-up. In the final, Millerton dominated the first half but were unable to beat the Ponsonby defence. Jack Jepson put the Auckland side up after 20 minutes against the run of play, and Innes doubled the lead before the break through a defensive mistake. In the second spell Tom Pollock pulled a goal back for Millerton, but they were unable to get a second breakthrough, despite having several good chances.

== Results ==
=== Wellington Qualifiers ===
3 June 1933

Swifts	4 - 2	N.A.D.A.
Shankie ×3, Hawken	Report	J. Cullen, R. Cullen (pen.)

Basin Reserve, Wellington
Referee: Mr. A. E. Caisley
3 June 1933

Waterside	2 - 0	Marist Old Boys
McLeod ×2	Report

Basin Reserve, Wellington
Referee: Mr. T. Plant
3 June 1933

Lower Hutt	0 - 3	Seatoun
	Report	H. Salt ×2, James

Basin Reserve, Wellington
Referee: Mr. N. Brian
3 June 1933

Hospital	3 - 3 aet	Petone
	Report

Porirua Hospital, Porirua
Referee: Mr. G. Jackson
17 June 1933

Petone	4 - 0 Replay	Hospital
Campbell, Leslie ×2, Woods	Report

Basin Reserve, Wellington
Referee: Mr. G. Jackson
1 July 1933

Waterside	3 - 2 Match result void after protest by Swifts	Swifts
Baistow, Dunsmuir, Patterson	Report	Shankie, Bilby

Basin Reserve, Wellington
Referee: Mr. G. Jackson
1 July 1933

Petone	4 - 2	Seatoun
Watson, Woods, Leslie	Report	Janes, Searle

Petone Recreation Ground, Wellington
Referee: Mr. J. Graham
22 July 1933

Swifts	5 - 7 aet Replay	Waterside
Kelly, Bilby ×2, Hawken ×2, Dainty (og)	Report	Patterson, A. Longbottom ×4, McLeod

Basin Reserve, Wellington
Referee: Mr. G. Jackson
Wellington Final
29 July 1933

Waterside	4 - 3	Petone
Abernethy, Dunsmuir, McLeod, Longbottom	Report	Watson, Woods ×2

Basin Reserve, Wellington
Referee: Mr. A. E. Caisley

=== Auckland Qualifiers ===
Auckland Final
15 July 1933

Ponsonby	3 - 3 No extra time played	Tramways
Foreman ×2, Innes	Report	Spencer ×2, Cumming

Blandford Park, Auckland
Referee: Mr. E. F. Miller
Auckland Final Replay
22 July 1933

Ponsonby	3 - 2 Replay	Tramways
Foreman ×2, Jepson	Report	Williams, McMillan

Blandford Park, Auckland
Referee: Mr. E. F. Miller

=== South Auckland Qualifiers ===
17 June 1933

Huntly Thistle	3 - 4	Rotowaro
	Report

Huntly Recreation Ground, Huntly
South Auckland (Waikato) Final
8 July 1933

Hamilton Wanderers	3 - 2	Rotowaro
Stewart ×3	Report	B. Caldwell ×2

Seddon Park, Hamilton
Referee: Mr. E. R. Marsh

=== Manawatu Qualifiers ===
Manawatu Final
24 June 1933

St. Andrew's	4 - 2	Palmerston North Athletic
South, Smillie, McSheffery (pen.), Brigdens	Report	Hearsey, Askam (pen.)

North Street Park, Palmerston North
Referee: Mr. A. H. Hesketh
Manawatu/Wanganui Final
22 July 1933

St. Andrew's	5 - 0	Wanganui Woollen Mills
Millar, Lyons, Coombs, Bridgens ×2	Report

North Street Park, Palmerston North
Referee: Mr. C. E. Downes

=== Westland Qualifiers ===
24 June 1933

Dobson	4 - 1	Taylorville
Durning ×2, Coutts ×2	Report	Rutherford

Dobson, Westland
Referee: S. Hewison
1 July 1933

Greymouth	0 - 6	Dobson
	Report	Durning, W. White ×2, Coutts ×2

Victoria Park, Greymouth
8 July 1933

Cobden	1 - 5	Runanga
Timlin	Report	Malpass ×5

Cobden Domain, Westland
Referee: R. Nelson
Westland Final
15 July 1933

Dobson	4 - 3 aet	Runanga
Short, Coutts, Dunning, Clark	Report	Malpass ×2, Wick (pen.)

Victoria Park, Greymouth
Referee: Mr. S. Hewison

=== Buller Qualifier ===
Buller Final
15 July 1933

Millerton All Blacks	2 - 1	Denniston Celtic
	Report

Westport, Buller
Buller/Westland Final
22 July 1933

Millerton All Blacks	1 - 0	Dobson
C. Orman	Report

Granity Domain, Granity

=== Otago Qualifier ===
1 July 1933

Northern	1 - 4	Maori Hill
Anderson	Report	Gordon ×2, Balk, Baird

Caledonian Ground, Dunedin
Referee: Mr. W. Smith

=== Canterbury Qualifiers ===
1 July 1933

Christchurch Thistle	4 - 0	Nomads 'A'
Clements, Adam, D. Sutherland, Bruce	Report

English Park, Christchurch
Referee: Mr. H. Weatherhead
1 July 1933

Christchurch Technical Old Boys	4 - 2	Rangers
T. Walls, F. Craggs ×2, M. Gordon	Report	Sloan, A. Smythe

Spreydon Domain, Christchurch
Referee: Mr. J. Cawtheray
1 July 1933

Western	5 - 1	Nomads 'B'
McMillan 2 (1 pen.), Roberts ×2, Haley	Report	Beale

Richmond Park, Christchurch
Referee: Mr. J. Crew
1 July 1933

Linwood	10 - 0	St. Albans
Gibbs, Wilson ×4, Allen 4 (1 pen.), Thornton,	Report

Linwood Park, Christchurch
Referee: Mr. A. Davies
8 July 1933

Linwood	2 - 2	Christchurch Technical Old Boys
P. Allen, W. Wilson	Report	Craggs, J. Smith

English Park, Christchurch
Referee: Mr. E. Davey
8 July 1933

Christchurch Thistle	4 - 0	Western
G. Walker, Adam, D. Sutherland, G. Sutherland	Report

English Park, Christchurch
Referee: Mr. E. B. Harris
15 July 1933

Christchurch Technical Old Boys	6 - 0 Replay	Linwood
G. Smith ×2, T Walls, K. Greenwood, A. Scott, D. Weir	Report

English Park, Christchurch
Referee: Mr. J. Crew
Canterbury Final
22 July 1933

Christchurch Thistle	6 - 1	Christchurch Technical Old Boys
G. Walker ×2, R. Adam ×2, J. Bruce, D. Sutherland	Report	G. Smith

English Park, Christchurch
Referee: Mr. G. Cox

=== Quarter-finals ===
Canterbury/Buller Final
29 July 1933

Millerton All Blacks	3 - 2	Christchurch Thistle
Pollock, Blyth, Taylor	Report	Bruce, Walker

Millerton Domain, Millerton
Otago Final
8 July 1933

Maori Hill	1 - 0	Mosgiel
Gordon	Report

Caledonian Ground, Dunedin
Referee: Mr. A. Riach
Manawatu/Wellington Final
5 August 1933

St. Andrew's	1 - 4	Waterside
Bridgens	Report	Patterson, McLeod ×2, Baistow

North Street Park, Palmerston North
Referee: Mr. G. Stewart
Auckland/South Auckland (Waikato) Final
29 July 1933

Ponsonby	3 - 0	Hamilton Wanderers
Ahern, Morrison, Jepson	Report

Blandford Park, Auckland

=== Semi-finals (Island Finals) ===
South Island Final
12 August 1933

Millerton All Blacks	v Millerton win by default	Maori Hill
	Report

Greymouth, Westland
North Island Final
12 August 1933

Ponsonby	3 - 0	Waterside
Innes, Jepson ×2	Report

Blandford Park, Auckland
Referee: Mr. W. K. Tugby

=== Final ===
1933 Chatham Cup Final
26 August 1933

Ponsonby	2 – 1	Millerton All Blacks
Jepson, Innes	Report	Tom Pollock

Basin Reserve, Wellington
Referee: J. Sanderson
