= 1928 Chatham Cup =

Tournament details
- Venue(s): Basin Reserve, Wellington
- Dates: 25 August 1928
- Teams: 26

Final positions
- Champions: Petone (1st title)
- Runners-up: Northern
- Semifinalists: Auckland Y.M.C.A.; Christchurch Thistle

Tournament statistics
- Matches played: 24

The 1928 Chatham Cup was the sixth annual nationwide knockout football competition in New Zealand.

The competition was run on a regional basis, with six regional associations and the affiliated sub-associations of the larger regions competing. Auckland, Wellington, Manawatu, Hawkes Bay, Canterbury, and Otago each holding separate qualifying rounds. The Hawkes Bay and Otago regions had only a single team entered each, Hastings United and Northern AFC. Hastings United's first match was the Manawatu/Hawkes Bay Final against St. Andrew's. Northern AFC automatically advanced to the South Island final, meeting the winner of the Canterbury finals, Christchurch Thistle. The South Auckland F.A., a sub-association of the Auckland Football Association, entered teams from the towns of Huntly and Pukemiro. The Waro Wanderers from Hikurangi were affiliated members of the North Auckland F.A. sub-association.

Teams taking part in the final rounds included, Waro Wanderers (Northland) Auckland YMCA, Huntly (Waikato), St. Andrews (Manawatu), Northern (Dunedin), Hastings United (Hawkes Bay), St Albans (Christchurch), Ponsonby (Auckland), Petone and Wellington Marist.

Petone's Andy Leslie scored 9 goals in the club's 1928 Chatham Cup run in his first full season with the "Pets" from Wellington, after returning from a single season with Christchurch club Villa, where he won the Canterbury Football Association's English Cup.

== Controversies ==
=== The Wellington F.A., Petone, Thistle, McKee and Waterside ===
The N.Z.F.A. ordered Petone and Thistle (Wellington) to meet in a Round One re-match on 23 June, due to Petone playing an unregistered player in the first fixture on 9 June, voiding the result. The Wellington Football Association (W.F.A.) had granted the player in question, McKee, a transfer from Waterside a week before the match, believing he was financial with Waterside. Petone stated that they had verbal admission that McKee was financial with Waterside, and played him against Thistle. At a W.F.A. meeting in mid-June, Waterside advised the management committee that McKee was in fact unfinancial and the transfer should not have been completed. McKee was suspended from playing until the next W.F.A. meeting and the re-match scheduled as a Cup and League double due to the Wellington Championship match, between the two clubs also being affected by the use of McKee in the Petone side. In late June, Thistle protested to the W.F.A. in regards to the previous match with Petone being a championship and Chatham Cup fixture, it was decided by the W.F.A. at its management committee meeting on 27 June, that the match be reclassified as a Chatham Cup game only.

=== The NZ Council, Hastings United, St. Andrews and Petone ===
A complaint forwarded to the Manawatu Football Association from St. Andrews FC in July, carried an accusation of dilatoriness on the part of the N.Z.F.A. in regards to the scheduling of the Hastings United v St. Andrew's match fixture due 14 July. The Hawkes Bay Association (H.B.A.) had only been advised by the N.Z.F.A. of the match on the 5th of July leaving limited time to prepare. The Manawatu Association took the decision to forward the complaint to the N.Z.F.A. Meeting a week after the match had gone ahead as per schedule, with Hastings United the victors over St. Andrew's, the H.B.A. decided to protest the recent venue change of the next round's match against Wellington winner's Petone. The match was understood by the H.B.A to be arranged for as a home tie in Hastings, helping to advance the sport in the region, then was found to be scheduled for Wellington. The protest carried with it a threat of forfeiture from the competition by Hastings United should there be no reconsideration of the match arrangements by the N.Z.F.A. The N.Z.F.A. guaranteed £25 toward the expenses of the Hastings United to make the trip, and advised the H.B.A. to get the team to Wellington. At the same point of the competition the N.Z.F.A. was met with the protest from the Hawkes Bay Association, the Auckland Y.M.C.A. objected to their match with Waro Wanderers, scheduled to take place at Hikurangi, on account of travelling expense to Whangārei and potential lost gate earnings from not having the fixture at Blandford Park. In the last week of July the N.Z.F.A. contacted the Manawatu Association citing difficulties in connection with the District Final scheduling and finding it necessary to amend the fixture, thereby requesting the hosting of the match to be accommodated by the Manawatu Association at Palmerston North. The Manawatu Association later agreed to stage the match between Hastings United and Petone.

=== Canterbury protest final location ===
The Canterbury Football Association, when meeting on the evening of 27 June decided to write to N.Z.F.A. in protest against the Chatham Cup final again being scheduled for the North Island.

=== Auckland Thistle ===
After a dispute with the Auckland Football Association (A.F.A.), Thistle withdrew from all competitions. Later in July, Thistle, Bon Accord, Richmond and Celtic formed the Auckland City and Suburban Football Association (A.C.S.F.A.) with an intention to affiliate with the Scottish Football Association. By the end of the 1928 season the (Auckland) Celtic club, which had formed with players from Thistle, applied to the A.F.A. for affiliation after officially leaving the A.C.S.F.A. Consequent of the withdrawal of Thistle from the A.F.A., a number of Auckland clubs requested reopening the Chatham Cup entries. The New Zealand Council later instructed the A.F.A. that entries had closed and the draw would stand.

== Teams ==
=== Auckland & Districts ===
Belmont, Y.M.C.A., Ponsonby, Thistle, Huntly, Huntly Thistle, Pukemiro Junction, Waro Wanderers

=== Manawatu ===
St. Andrews FC, Palmerston North Athletic

=== Hawkes Bay ===
Hastings United

=== Wellington ===
Thistle, Petone, Diamonds, Y.M.C.A., Mental Hospital A.F.C, Wellington Marist, Lower Hutt City

=== Canterbury ===
St. Albans, Christchurch Thistle, New Brighton, Western A.F.C., Christchurch Technical Old Boys', Nomads FC

=== Otago ===
Northern

== The 1928 final ==
The final returned to the Basin Reserve, Wellington after an absence of one year - a venue which was used regularly until the 1970s.

Petone defied the odds to reach the final, despite only being in their first year of senior football. As with the previous year's final, the Wellington wind was to play a major part in the final. The only goal of the match was a long wind-assisted shot halfway through the first half, struck from 30 metres out by William Farquhar. Some contemporary reports suggest that the ball deflected of Northern defender Jim Scoular, but the goal is officially credited to Farquhar. The same reports also suggest that Northern had dominated the match, and that Petone's win was somewhat fortuitous. G. Jackson of Wellington became the first official to referee two finals (he had previously refereed the 1927 final).

The New Zealand Prime Minister Gordon Coates presented the Chatham Cup to Petone's captain McVean after the match.

== Results ==
=== Rounds ===
==== Wellington Qualifiers ====
9 June 1928
Wellington Round One

Petone	3 - 0†	Wellington Thistle
Stobbs, Leslie ×2	Report

Petone Recreation Ground, Wellington
Referee: Mr. A. E. Calsley
- † result void. Match replayed 23 June.
9 June 1928
Wellington Round One

Wellington YMCA	3 - 2 (a.e.t.)	Diamonds
Dempster ×2, Lack	Report	Stark 2 ( (pen.) )

Basin Reserve, Wellington
Attendance: 2000+
Referee: Mr. C. Ward
9 June 1928
Wellington Round One

Hutt	1 - 3	Wellington Marist
Lowry	Report	Marchment ×2, Cudby

Hutt Recreation Ground, Wellington
Referee: Mr. D. Stirritt
- Wellington Round One bye: Hospital AFC
Replay
23 June 1928
Wellington Round One

Petone	4 - 2	Wellington Thistle
Cleverly, Mackenzie ×2, Leslie	Report	Johnstone, Cunningham

Petone Recreation Ground, Wellington
Referee: Mr. R. Ball
30 June 1928
Wellington Round Two

Wellington Marist	2 - 1	Hospital
Burke, Cudby	Report	Anderson

Basin Reserve, Wellington
Referee: Mr. G. Jackson
30 June 1928
Wellington Round Two

Wellington YMCA	0 - 4	Petone
	Report	Leslie ×4

Basin Reserve, Wellington
Referee: Mr. C. F. Ward
14 July 1928
Wellington Final

Wellington Marist	2 - 3	Petone
Condon ×2	Report	Leslie, James, McKenzie

Basin Reserve, Wellington
Referee: Mr. G. Jackson

==== Hawkes Bay - Manawatu Qualifiers ====
30 June 1928
Manawatu District Final

St. Andrews	2 - 1	Palmerston North Athletic
Corkingdale ×2	Report	Askam pen.

North Street, Palmerston North
Referee: Mr. Forbes
14 July 1928
Hawkes Bay/Manawatu District Final

Hastings United	4 - 3	St. Andrews
Chilton, D. Penman ×2, Clark	Report	Corkingdale ×3

Cornwall Park, Hastings
Referee: Mr. R. Gallacher
4 August 1928
Wellington/Hawkes Bay Final

Petone	3 – 1	Hastings United
Leslie ×2, McKenzie,	Report	D. Penman

North Street Park, Palmerston North
Referee: Mr. H. Johnston

==== Canterbury Qualifiers ====
7 July 1928
Canterbury Round One

Nomads	0 - 1	Western
	Report	Kennedy

English Park, Christchurch
Referee: Mr. J. Stout
7 July 1928
Canterbury Round One

Christchurch Thistle	4 - 1	Christchurch Technical Old Boys'
Spiers, D. Sutherland ×2, Arburthnot,	Report	J. Teichert (pen.)

English Park, Christchurch
Referee: Mr. H. Smyth

Canterbury first round byes: New Brighton and St Albans

14 July 1928
Canterbury Semi-final

Western	0 - 1	St. Albans
	Report	Tennant

English Park, Christchurch
Referee: Mr. Hesketh
14 July 1928
Canterbury Semi-final

Christchurch Thistle	3 - 1	New Brighton
Arbuthnot, A. Sutherland, Woods	Report	Sharr

English Park, Christchurch
Referee: Mr. W. Campbell
21 July 1928
Canterbury Final

Christchurch Thistle	2 - 0	St. Albans
Wood, (Bunt og.)	Report

English Park, Christchurch
Referee: Mr. M. Wilson

==== Auckland Qualifiers ====
7 July 1928
Auckland Round Two

Auckland YMCA	2 - 1	Belmont
Grant, Malcolm	Report	Trewheela

Blandford Park, Auckland
Referee: Mr. E. Parkinson
7 July 1928
Auckland Round Two

Auckland Thistle	defaulted to	Ponsonby
Thistle withdrawn by N.Z.F.A.	Report	Ponsonby win by default

Auckland
14 July 1928
Auckland Final

Ponsonby	1 - 4	Auckland YMCA
Stewart	Report	Humphreys ×3, Whaley

Blandford Park, Auckland
Referee: Mr. A. E. Parkinson

==== South Auckland (Waikato) Qualifiers ====
16 June 1928
South Auckland Round One

Huntly	1 - 0	Huntly Thistle
D. Hall	Report

Huntly Recreation Ground
Referee: Mr. Jack Bate

South Auckland Round One bye: Pukemiro Junction

23 June 1928
South Auckland District Final

Huntly	1 - 2	Pukemiro Junction
A. Hall	Report	B. Dodds, Latimer

Thistle Ground, Huntly
Referee: Mr. Jas Baillie

===== North Auckland - Auckland Final =====
4 August 1928
Auckland District Final

Waro Wanderers	2 - 5	Auckland YMCA
Grant, Shepherd	Report	Hazel, Chalmers ×2, Humphreys, Whaley

Hotel Park, Hikurangi
Attendance: 300+
Referee: Mr. Fernleigh

===== Auckland - South Auckland (Waikato) Final =====
11 August 1928
North Island Semi-final

Auckland YMCA	3 - 1	Pukemiro Junction
McAuslan, Humphries ×2	Report	Latimer

Blandford Park, Auckland
Referee: Mr. E. Parkinson

Note
Northern were the only entrant from the lower South Island and entered the competition as South Island Finalists.

=== Semi-finals ===
North Island Final
18 August 1928

Auckland YMCA	1 - 2	Petone
Whaley	Report	McKenzie, Leslie

Blandford Park, Auckland
Referee: Mr. E. Parkinson
South Island Final
18 August 1928

Northern	1 - 0	Christchurch Thistle
McTavish	Report

Kensington Oval, Dunedin
Attendance: 1000+
Referee: Mr. J. Morwood

=== Final ===
Teams

Petone: Peter McVean, R. Steel, Syd Haines, William Farquhar, Jim Campbell, A. Stobbs, J. McKenzie, J. Irvine, Andy Leslie, J. Cameron, T. James

Northern: A. McQuarrie, L. Coates, Jim Scoular, Alex Perry, Hugh Munsie, J. Baird, A. McDowell, Tom McHugh, Tom Ruddiman, Tom McCormack, Rab McLean

1928 Chatham Cup Final
25 August 1928

Petone	1 - 0	Northern
Farquhar	Report

Basin Reserve, Wellington
Attendance: 5000
Referee: G. Jackson
