= 1934 Chatham Cup =

Tournament details
- Venue(s): Basin Reserve, Wellington
- Dates: 15 September 1934

Final positions
- Champions: Auckland Thistle (1st title)
- Runners-up: Christchurch Thistle

The 1934 Chatham Cup was the 12th annual nationwide knockout football competition in New Zealand.

The competition was run on a regional basis, with regional associations each holding separate qualifying rounds.

Teams taking part included: Northern and Maori Hill (Dunedin); Hamilton Wanderers and Glen Afton (Waikato); Rangers, Millerton All Blacks, Runanga, and Dobson (West Coast); Hospital, Petone, Wellington Marist, and Waterside (Wellington); Abels, Ponsonby, Auckland Thistle, Eastern Suburbs AFC, and Y.M.C.A. (Auckland); and Western AFC, Christchurch Thistle, and Christchurch Technical Old Boy's (Canterbury). A late entry came from Nomads of Christchurch and was accepted by the NZFA. Later in June, an entry from the Greymouth club was declined.

== The 1934 final ==
The final was accompanied by highland dancers and pipe bands, celebrating what became known as the "Scottish final", due to the names of the two teams involved. Christchurch was the first team to score through a header from J. Adam, and almost had a second, with a goal late in the first half being disallowed. Auckland had the better of the second half, however, and the scores were levelled by a G. Sutherland own goal (this goal is sometimes credited to Wally Watson). The winning goal from Les Wood came five minutes from full-time. The match was refereed by G. Jackson, who made his third appearance as officiator of the final, having also refereed in both 1927 and 1928.

== Results ==
=== Semi-finals ("Island finals") ===
North Island Final
4 August 1934

Auckland Thistle	4 – 1	Petone
Kay 2, Williamson, Wright	Report	Woods

Blandford Park, Auckland
Referee: Mr. B. Rickard
South Island Final
4 August 1934

Christchurch Thistle	3 – 0	Dobson
G. Walker 2, D. Sutherland	Report

English Park, Christchurch
Referee: Mr. E. B. Harris

=== Final ===
1934 Chatham Cup Final
15 September 1934

Auckland Thistle	2 – 1	Christchurch Thistle
Watson, L. Wood	Report	R. Adam

Basin Reserve, Wellington
Referee: Mr. G. Jackson
