= 1927 Chatham Cup =

New Zealand football competition

Tournament details
- Venue(s): Newtown Park, Wellington
- Dates: 24 September 1927; 98 years ago

Final positions
- Champions: Ponsonby (1st title)
- Runners-up: Northern

The 1927 Chatham Cup was the fifth annual nationwide knockout football competition in New Zealand.

The competition was run on a regional basis, with five regional associations (Auckland, Wellington, Manawatu, Canterbury, and Otago) each holding separate qualifying rounds.

Teams taking part in the final rounds included Ponsonby (who defeated Auckland Thistle in the Auckland regional final), St. Andrews (Manawatu), Northern (Dunedin), Nomads (Christchurch), and Wellington Marist (who defeated YMCA in the Wellington regional final).

== Teams ==
=== Auckland ===
Waro Wanderers, Ponsonby, Northcote, Royal New Zealand Navy, Auckland Thistle, Auckland YMCA, Onehunga., Tramways, North Shore, Huntly, Huntly Thistle, Rotowaro, Pukemiro.

=== Wellington ===
Hospital, Welgasco, Wellington Marist, Diamond, Wellington YMCA, Swifts, Johnsonville, South Wellington, Institute Old Boys', Petone FC, Wellington Thistle.

=== Canterbury ===
Nomads, Christchurch Thistle, Western, Christchurch Technical Old Boys.

=== Manawatu ===
St. Andrews, Palmerston North Athletic

=== Otago ===
Northern

== Sunnyside ==
The 1926 champions Sunnyside, as a result of a disagreement with the Canterbury Football Association (C.F.A.) regarding fixtures, withdrew from all competitions in April 1927. A request was made to the C.F.A. to schedule three home games a month for Sunnyside owing to an allowance of only one Saturday per month leave for staff from the hospital, it was explained by the secretary of Sunnyside, Mr. Iain McLeod in a letter to the Christchurch Star. McLeod reinforced to the paper that the purpose of the team was for entertainment of the patients and now the hospital had begun negotiations with the rugby football union to switch codes. A £41 payment to Sunnyside by the N.Z.F.A via the C.F.A. was also clarified by McLeod after reimbursement of 3s 8d had been received by the champion players after an expense of £4/player to travel to Dunedin and Wellington in 1926. The sum forward to the club by the N.Z.F.A for the Chatham Cup win, raised questions in the papers prior to McLeod disclosing a considerable deduction of more than £32 by the C.F.A. due to prior arrangement. A number of Sunnyside players joined alternate association clubs in Christchurch after the decision to withdraw.

== The 1927 final ==
The final was played at Newtown Park, Wellington - the second of three finals to be held at that venue. In 1928 the final moved to the Basin Reserve, a venue which was used regularly until the 1970s; Newtown Park was not to host the final again until 1989.

In the final, which was noted by contemporary sources as being a dour match, Ponsonby made good use of a stiff Wellington wind in the first half, with goals from Gerry Hunter, Bob Innes, and J. Adshead. In the second half, the wind favoured Northern, who pulled two goals back through A. McDowell and A. McTavish. Northern pressed for the equaliser, spending long periods close to Ponsonby's goalmouth, but the Auckland side's defence held and the survived to win 3–2.

=== Northern protest ===
On returning to Dunedin from Wellington, the Northern club officials made the decision to protest the result of the final, on the grounds of an oversight of the rules regarding player eligibility and was not prepared to accept the N.Z.F.A. decision. It was also agreed by the Northern club that unless the matter was reconsidered by the N.Z.F.A. the case and the whole facts governing it would be set in motion to be placed before the Football Association in England. A football contributor to the Otago Daily Times had even gone so far as to claim the "Ponies" sportsmanship was poor. New Zealand representative Tom McCormack had travelled with the Northern side to Wellington, but prior to the match commencing McCormack was deemed injured. A twelfth player selected by the Otago Association, Tom Ruddiman, a member of Northern for the last decade, was available to replace McCormack, but the N.Z.F.A. declared this a breach of the cup rules. The captain of Ponsonby Bob Innes stated he was bound by the cup rules and did not have any power to agree to any infringement. The rule in question read as follows, "In the competition proper each player, except a player who has played for his club in the previous season, and has never played for any other club, must have played twice for his club in the current season seven days at least previous to the match." Ruddiman had not met these stipulations, though he had played for Northern in the 1927 season. To file the protest with the N.Z.F.A. cost Northern a £2 2s fee, a reply was received late in 1927 dismissing the protest and retaining the fee.

== Results ==
=== Auckland Qualifiers ===
3 June 1927
Auckland Round One

Ponsonby	2-1	Northcote
Bell, Hunter	Report	Williams

Blandford Park, Auckland
Referee: Mr. G.T. Lee
4 June 1927
Auckland Round One

Auckland Thistle	4-1	Auckland YMCA
Kay ×2, og W. Lewis, D. Stewart,	Report	Humphreys

Blandford Park, Auckland
Referee: Mr. J. S. McMillan
4 June 1927
Auckland Round One

Onehunga	5-3	Navy
Cheeseman, Miller, Rivers, Knott, Terry	Report	Gilmore, Walker, Nimmo

Onehunga, Auckland
Referee: Mr. A. Parkinson
4 June 1927
Auckland Round One

Tramways	1-1	North Shore
Spencer	Report	Baxter

Blandford Park, Auckland
Referee: Mr. J. Low
Replay
18 June 1927
Auckland Round One

Tramways	0-1	North Shore
	Report	Simpson (og)

Blandford Park, Auckland
16 July 1927
Auckland semi-final

Auckland Thistle	2-0	North Shore
J. Stewart, Gerrard og.	Report

Victoria Park, Auckland
Referee: Mr. L. W. Tuttle
16 July 1927
Auckland semi-final

Ponsonby	4-3	Onehunga
Hunter, Ahern, Mooney, Wright	Report	Mellor ×2, Cheeseman

Victoria Park, Auckland
Referee: Mr. J. Low
6 August 1927
Auckland Final

Auckland Thistle	0-1	Ponsonby
	Report	Tomilty

Blandford Park, Auckland
Referee: Mr. J. T. Jennings
25 June 1927
South Auckland Qualifier

Pukemiro	0-1	Huntly Thistle
	Report

Pukemiro
Referee: Mr. J. Wallace
25 June 1927
South Auckland Qualifier

Rotowaro	4-2	Huntly
McCullum ×2, P. Hunter, Dodds	Report	Evans, Hall

Rotowaro
Referee: Mr. J. Bate
30 July 1927
South Auckland District Final

Huntly Thistle	0 - 2	Rotowaro
	Report

Recreation Park, Huntly
Referee: Mr. Jas. Wallace
20 August 1927
Auckland - North Auckland District Final

Ponsonby	5-0	Waro Wanderers
Innes ×2, Bell, Tomilty, Hunter	Report

Blandford Park, Auckland
Attendance: 1000
27 August 1927
Auckland-South Auckland Final

Rotowaro	0-4	Ponsonby
	Report	Innes ×2, Adshead, Hunter

Recreation Park, Huntly

=== Wellington Qualifiers ===
11 June 1927
Wellington Round One

Hospital	7-1	Welgasco
	Report

Porirua Hospital, Wellington
Referee: Mr. G. Jackson
11 June 1927
Wellington Round One

Wellington Marist	4-2	Diamond
Condon ×2, McElligott, Thomas	Report	Hearne ×2

Basin Reserve, Wellington
Referee: Mr. G.V. Hills
11 June 1927
Wellington Round One

Wellington YMCA	8-0	Swifts
Ballard, Rigby, Trott, Worth. (unknown individual scorers)	Report

Kelburn Park, Wellington
Referee: Mr. E. Watts

Wellington teams: Institute, Thistle, Petone, Johnsonville and South Wellington first round byes.

18 June 1927
Wellington Round Two

Institute Old Boys	3-1	Wellington Thistle
	Report

Basin Reserve, Wellington
Referee: Mr. E. Ormrod
18 June 1927
Wellington Round Two

Hospital	0-6	Petone
	Report

Porirua Hospital, Wellington
Referee: Mr. G. Goffin
18 June 1927
Wellington Round Two

Wellington Marist	1-0 Match abandoned	Johnsonville
	Report

Kelburn Park, Wellington
Referee: Mr. G. V. Hill

Match abandoned due to weather *

18 June 1927
Wellington Round Two

Wellington YMCA	8-0	South Wellington
	Report

Basin Reserve, Wellington
Referee: Mr. C. Ward
6 August 1927
Wellington semi-final

Wellington YMCA	3-1	Petone
Rigby ×2, ?	Report	Cordinor

Basin Reserve, Wellington
6 August 1927
Wellington semi-final

Wellington Marist	5-0	Johnsonville
Condon ×2, McElligott, Hickey, Thomas	Report

Basin Reserve, Wellington
Referee: Mr. E. Watts
27 August 1927
Wellington Final

Wellington Marist	8-0	Wellington YMCA
Barton ×3, McElligott, Cudby ×2, Marshment ×2	Report

Basin Reserve, Wellington
Referee: Mr. G. Jackson
20 August 1927
Manawatu District Final

St. Andrews	6-2	Palmerston North Athletic
Birch, Brookfield, McNab, Davis, Coombs ×2	Report	Whitehouse ×2

North Street Park, Palmerston North
Referee: Mr. H. Crouch
3 September 1927
Manawatu-Wellington Final

Wellington Marist	4–0	St. Andrews
Marchment, Condon ×2, McElligott	Report

Basin Reserve, Wellington
Referee: Mr. G. Goffin

=== Canterbury Qualifiers ===
16 July 1927
Canterbury Round One

Nomads	5-0	Christchurch Thistle
Wilson, Trotter, Bryan, Speirs, Thompson	Report

Richmond Park, Christchurch
Referee: Mr. M. Thornley
16 July 1927
Canterbury Round One

Technical Old Boys	2-0	Western
Harbutt, Barwell	Report

English Park, Christchurch
Referee: Mr. H. Smyth
30 July 1927
Canterbury Final

Nomads	3-1	Western
Trotter ×2, J. Thompson,	Report	Clements

English Park, Christchurch
Referee: Mr. M. Thornley

=== Semi-finals (Island finals) ===
North Island Final
10 September 1927

Ponsonby	2-1	Wellington Marist
Innes, Tomilty	Report	Thomas

Blandford Park, Auckland
South Island Final
27 August 1927

Nomads	1-2	Northern
Trotter	Report	McTavish, McLean

English Park, Christchurch
Referee: Mr. Thornley

=== Final ===
Teams

Ponsonby: H. Watts, M. Williams, T. Pickett, John Morrison, George Wright, J. Mooney, Gerry Hunter, Clem Bell, Bob Innes, J. Tomilty, J. Adshead

Northern: A. McQuarrie, L. Coates, Jim Scoular, Alex Perry, Hugh Munsie, Reg Cherry, A. McDowell, Tom McHugh, A. McTavish, Tom McCormack, Rab McLean

1927 Final
24 September 1927

Ponsonby	3 – 2	Northern
Hunter, Innes, Adshead	Report	McDowell, McTavish

Newtown Park, Wellington
Referee: G. Jackson
