= Brunner Borough =

Borough in New Zealand

Coordinates: 42°25′57″S 171°19′22″E

- Borough of New Zealand
- 26 November 1887 – 1971
- Capital: Brunner
- History
  - Established: 26 November 1887
  - Disestablished: 1971
- Today part of: Grey District

The Brunner Borough was a borough on New Zealand's West Coast from 1887 to 1971. It was formed from an area that belonged to Grey County and, at disestablishment, merged back into Grey County.

== History ==
In September 1887, some residents petitioned the governor, Sir William Jervois, to have Brunner (at the time still commonly called Brunnerton) and some nearby settlements constituted a borough. The petition was granted and an election for mayor was called for 21 November 1887. Two candidates contested the election and Francis McParland was successful. Three days later, nine councillors were elected, with 21 candidates contested this second election. One of the successful candidates was Joseph Petrie, who was simultaneously the mayor of Greymouth. The newly elected council first met on 26 November 1887 and with that meeting, the borough came into existence.

In early 1887, Grey County had committed itself to building a footbridge over the Grey River connecting Wallsend and Taylorville following a poll by its ratepayers for a NZ£2,500 loan. As the bridge fell into the Brunner Borough area, the borough council had the project transferred to itself.

== Location and services ==
The Brunner Borough was located either side of the Grey River / Māwheranui. South of the river, the land belonged to Westland. The river formed a provincial boundary until the dissolution of the provinces in 1877, with the southern side belonging to Westland and the northern side located in Nelson. Brunner, Wallsend, Dobson, and Stillwater were included within the boundaries of the borough. There were four churches within the borough (Anglican, Presbyterian, Methodist, and Roman Catholic), three state schools (in Dobson, Taylorville, and Stillwater), and a private school run by Catholic nuns. The size of the borough was 5,700 acres (23 km^{2}).

Views of Brunner Borough
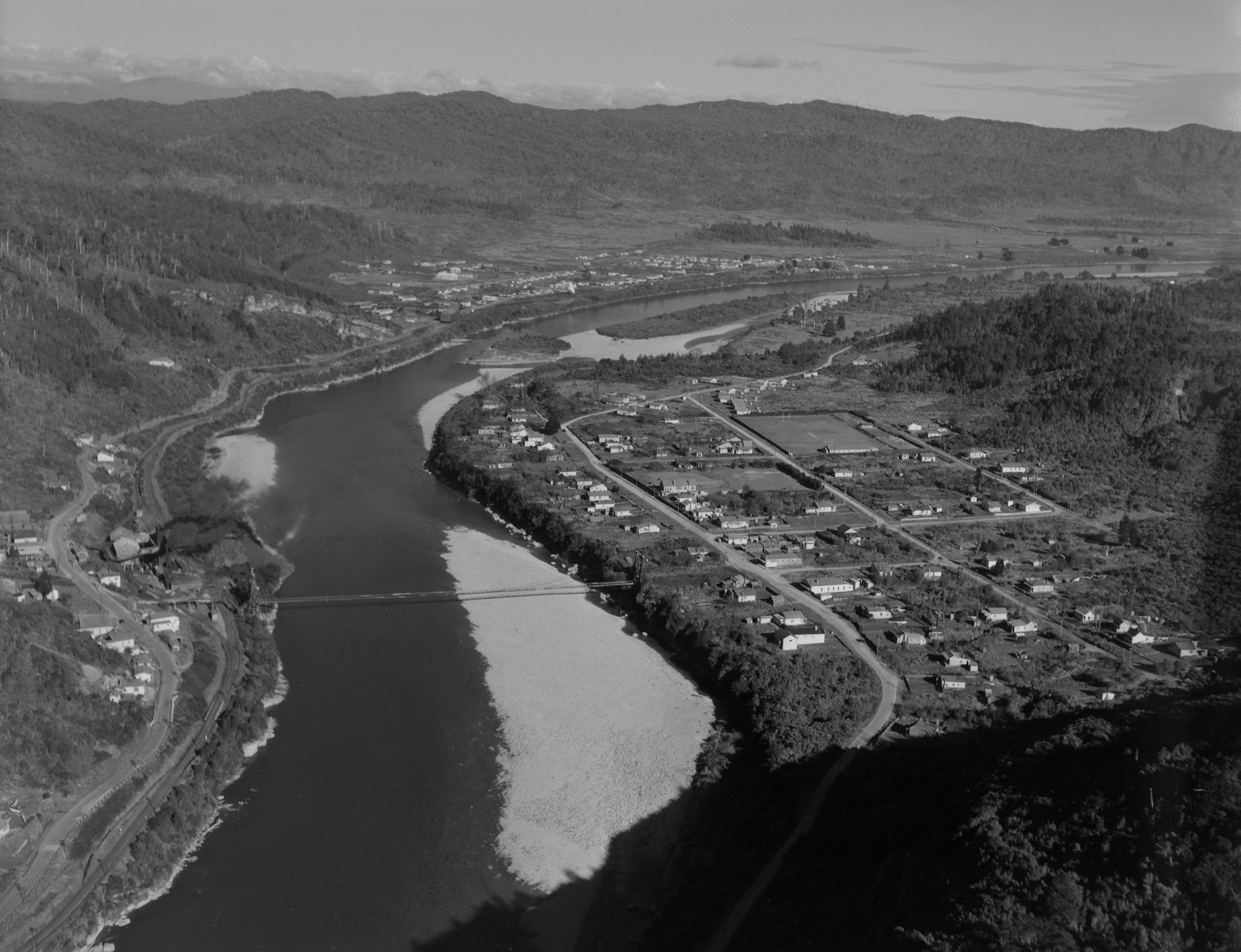
Wallsend (left) and Taylorville (right), the two major settlements of Brunner Borough

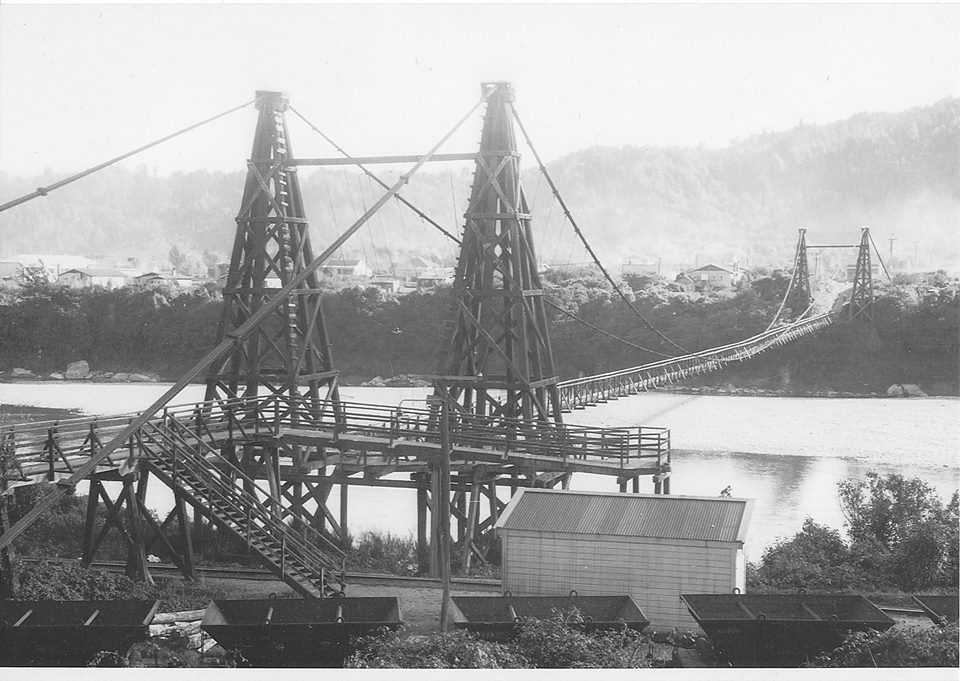
Taylorville Bridge seen from the Wallsend side of the Grey River

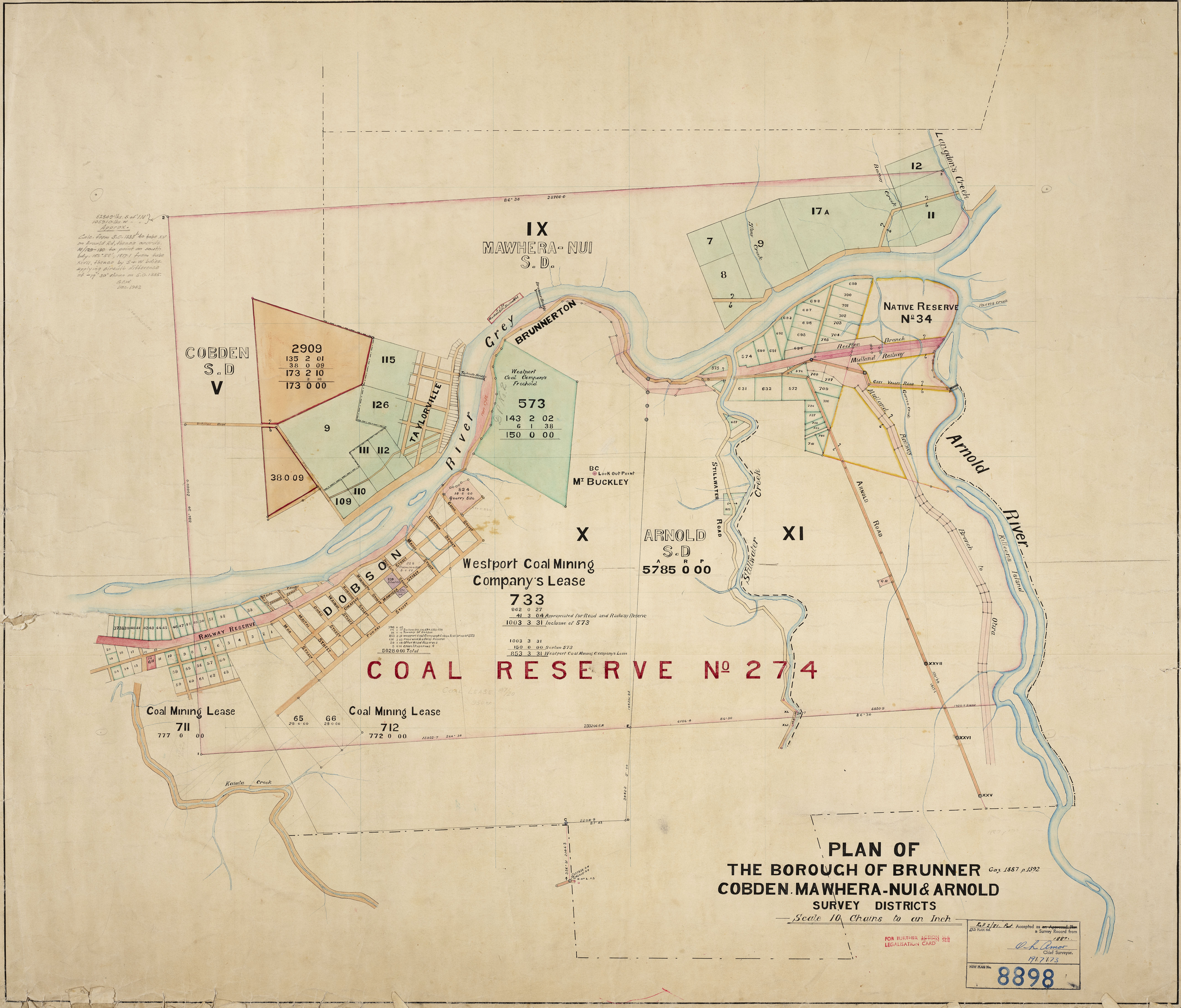
Map of Brunner Borough

== See also ==
- List of former territorial authorities in New Zealand
