= Koranui Incline =

- Coordinates: 41°43′18″S 171°47′22″E
- Country: New Zealand
- Region: West Coast
- District: Buller District

The Koranui Incline was an inclined tramway on the West Coast of the South Island of New Zealand that, for four years from late 1882 to the end of 1886, brought coal from a mine high on Mt Frederick down to a railway line near sea level.

It was first powered by a single engine that moved the whole 3.6 kilometre (2.2 mile) length of ropeway, but was later modified into a series of five self-acting inclines.

== History ==
The Koranui Incline was located in the Waimangaroa valley on the West Coast of the South Island of New Zealand. It ran from the Koranui Coal Mining Company’s mine on the southern slopes of Mt Frederick and descended to the north bank of the Waimangaroa River – with a total fall of 700 metres (2,300 ft) and a length of 3.6 kilometres (2.2 miles). A bridge across the river connected the incline to the Conns Creek branch railway that followed the south bank of the river to the main Westport to Seddonville line.

The more famous Denniston Incline, on the other side of the river and further up the valley from the Koranui Incline, was smaller, with a fall of 518 metres (1,700 ft) and a length of 1.67 kilometres (1.04 miles).

The survey for the incline was completed by John Rochfort by 19 October 1877, construction began in 1879, and the incline opened in November 1882.

As originally built, the incline was divided into four stages (of 644, 1207, 1182 and 634 metres in length) and the ropes that worked each one were connected at the stage breaks by means of double drums. This allowed one engine to keep the whole length of 3.6 kilometres working. The drum diameters were so proportioned that the sets of trucks would arrive at the stage breaks simultaneously despite the incline stages being of unequal lengths. Trucks holding about 1.5 tons of coal each were chained together in sets of six, and two sets were operated on each portion of the incline – eight sets in all. The track gauge was two feet (0.61 m).

However, the incline did not work well. In 1884, the company chairman reported to shareholders that "one of the greatest difficulties that had had to be overcome in working the mine had been the task of finding a competent mechanical engineer to work the incline." A new engineer, Henry Hughes, was engaged at the end of 1883 and the whole system remodelled. George Binns, an Inspector of Mines, had suggested in 1883 that an ordinary endless rope system would be better than the system then being tried for lowering coal on the incline. Mr Hughes adopted this idea and altered the system into five self-acting inclines, each with an endless rope. In 1884, George Binns reported that the new inclines worked very well, but noted it was necessary to stop each incline every time a tub (truck) passed the incline terminus, causing considerable delays. He expected this would soon be resolved.

The incline now worked better, and mine production also improved, but profitability did not. The Koranui Coal Mining Company was bought by one of the main shareholders (Mr Robert Williams) in August 1884, who sold it to the Union Steam Ship Company of New Zealand on 1 August 1885. It was then bought by the Westport Coal Company in about February 1887, which operated the nearby Denniston Incline. The reason for this is probably that the first 1.6 kilometres (1 mile) of the 2.7 kilometre (1.7 mile) Conns Creek branch railway line (which connected the bottom of the Denniston Incline with the Westport to Seddonville railway) was owned by the Koranui Coal Mining Company.

Work at the Koranui mine ceased at the beginning of 1887 as the means of bringing the coal down the lengthy incline was too costly. The Westport Coal Company expressed hope in March 1887 that further extensive alterations to the incline would allow operations to resume, but by May 1887 the incline had been dismantled.

The Koranui mine and incline were worked intermittently during the incline’s four years of operation, with the overall level of activity indicated by the amount of coal produced: 1882, 196 tons; 1883, 3300 tons; 1884, 5989 tons; 1885, 30,539 tons; and 1886, 44,170 tons.

== The incline today ==
Traces of the former route of the Koranui Incline can be seen today from a lookout on the road to Denniston, on the opposite side of the valley.

There is some potential for the Koranui coalfield to be mined in the future. A 2007 assessment concluded: "The Koranui area contains about 1 million tonnes of coking coal that appears open ended to the east. Low stripping ratios make this coal attractive but access to the coal deposit will be difficult."

== See also ==
- Denniston Incline
- Rockies Incline
- Millerton Incline
