= Andrew Leslie =

Andrew Leslie may refer to:

- Andrew Leslie (footballer), Scottish footballer
- Andrew Leslie (general) (born 1957), retired Canadian Forces lieutenant-general; Canadian politician
- Andrew Leslie (shipbuilder) (1818–1894), Scottish shipbuilder
- Andrew Leslie, 5th Earl of Rothes (died 1611), Scottish nobleman
- Andy Leslie (born 1944), New Zealand footballer
- Andy Leslie (footballer)
