= Dennis Smith =

Dennis Smith may refer to:

== Sports ==
- Dennis Smith (safety) (born 1959), American football player
- Dennis Smith (tight end) (born 1967), American football player
- Dennis Smith (Australian footballer) (1939–2017), Australian footballer for Richmond
- Dennis Smith (ice hockey) (born 1964), American ice hockey defenseman
- Dennis Smith (New Zealand cricketer) (1913–1986), New Zealand fast bowler
- Dennis Smith (New Zealand footballer), New Zealand international footballer
- Dennis Smith (South African cricketer) (born 1971), South African cricketer and umpire
- Dennis Smith Jr. (born 1997), American basketball player
- Dennis Smith (darts player) (born 1969), English darts player

== Other ==
- Dennis Smith (director), American television director
- Dennis Smith (firefighter) (1940–2022), American firefighter and writer
- Dennis Smith (politician), Minnesota politician
- Dennis Smith (sculptor) (born 1942), American sculptor
- Dennis G. Smith, American government official
- L. Dennis Smith (1938–2021), American developmental biologist
- Dennis Smith (puppeteer), Swedish puppeteer for Fem myror är fler än fyra elefanter

== See also ==
- Denny Smith (born 1938), U.S. Representative from Oregon
- Denny Smith (singer), American singer
- Denis Smith (disambiguation)
