= Dick Hislop =

New Zealand footballer

Personal information
- Full name: Richard Hislop
- Place of birth: New Zealand

Senior career*
Years	Team	Apps	(Gls)
- Auckland Thistle

International career
1927	New Zealand	2	(1)
- * Club domestic league appearances and goals

Richard Hislop was a former association football player who represented New Zealand at international level.

Hislop played two official A-international matches for the All Whites in 1927, both against the touring Canadians, the first a 2–2 draw in which Hislop and Bob Innes were New Zealand's scorers on 25 June 1927, the second a 1–2 loss on 2 July.
