= Papahaua Range =

Mountains in New Zealand

Coordinates: 41°47′59.02″S 171°43′1.34″E

The Papahaua Range is a mountain range on the West Coast of New Zealand's South Island east of the town of Westport. It is a geological continuation of the Paparoa Range that is south of the Buller River and it runs north from the Buller Gorge to the Mōkihinui River. At its north end, it meets the Glasgow Range.

Significant coal deposits are located in the range, and the Denniston Incline at the end of the Conns Creek Branch railway was built up to a plateau in the Papahaua Range to provide railway access for some mines. Due to its extremely steep climb and spectacular operations, the Denniston Incline was known during its life as the "eighth wonder of the world" by locals.

The Papahaua Ranges are largely forested and human habitation is low. The decline of coal has led to some settlements such as Denniston and Millerton becoming virtually ghost towns.
