= 1936 Chatham Cup =

Tournament details
- Venue(s): Basin Reserve, Wellington
- Dates: 29 August 1936

Final positions
- Champions: Western (1st title)
- Runners-up: Auckland Thistle

The 1936 Chatham Cup was the 14th annual nationwide knockout football competition in New Zealand.

The competition was run on a regional basis, with regional associations each holding separate qualifying rounds.

The 26 entries that had been received by the NZFA by 1 June were Southland: Corinthians and Southern; Westland: Taylorville, Marist and Runanga; Buller: All Blacks; Otago: Maori Hill, Mosgiel and Roslyn Wakari; Canterbury: Western A, Western B, Thistle and Nomads; Wellington: Hospital, Marist, Waterside, Scottish Wanderers, Petone and Diamond; South Auckland: Hamilton Wanderers, Rotowaro and Starr Town; Auckland: Ponsonby, Thistle, Mount Albert Grammar Old Boys and Abels.

Ashburton, an unaffiliated club, applied for entry to the 1936 competition via the Canterbury Football Association who requested the club affiliate with the association before accepting the entry. After affiliation to the Canterbury Football Association Ashburton FC then decided to withdraw its entry to the Chatham Cup.

Teams taking part in the final rounds included Auckland Thistle, Waterside (Wellington), Western (Christchurch), and Maori Hill (Dunedin).

== The 1936 final ==
The final was the first in which two separate players (Bill White and Fred Angus) both scored two goals. One of White's goals was the first penalty to be scored from in a final. White scored first from the spot after just 12 minutes, and doubled his tally quarter of an hour later. Angus reduced the deficit to one before the break, and it was only through having a second strike disallowed that the Aucklanders were still behind at the interval. Injury to L. Williamson reduced Thistle to ten men for the majority of the second half (this being in the days before substitutes were allowed). Angus managed to score an equaliser for the northerners, however, but the scores were only to remain level briefly, with Geoff Ellis adding a third for Western. Williamson limped back on for the last few minutes, and though Thistle applied the pressure, Western held on to the lead.

== Results ==
25 July 1936

| Waterside | 3 - 1 | Hospital |
|---|---|---|
| Thompson, Atkinson, Jane | Report | Stanbridge |

Basin Reserve, Wellington
Referee: Mr. G. Forbes
1 August 1936

| Starr-Town | 1 - 10 | Auckland Thistle |
|---|---|---|
| Deakin | Report | Wright, Kay ×3, Woods ×4, Angus ×2 |

Huntly Recreation Ground, Huntly
Referee: Mr. J. Baillie
1 August 1936

| Western | w/o Western won by default | Mosgiel |
|---|---|---|
| | Report |

English Park, Christchurch
1 August 1936

| Runanga | 2 - 3 | Millerton All Blacks |
|---|---|---|
| Crowe, White | Report | Taylor, G. Orman, J. Blythe |

Victoria Park, Greymouth

=== Semi-finals ("Island finals") ===
North Island Final
15 August 1936

| Auckland Thistle | 5 - 1 | Waterside |
|---|---|---|
| Angus ×2, Wood, Wiseman, Kay | Report | Longbottom |

Blandford Park, Auckland
Referee: Mr. R. C. Brighton
South Island Final
22 August 1936

| Western | 2 - 1 | Millerton All Blacks |
|---|---|---|
| G. Smith, E. Hall | Report | P. Taylor |

English Park, Christchurch
Referee: Mr. E. B. Harris

=== Final ===
1936 Chatham Cup Final
29 August 1936

| Western | 3 – 2 | Auckland Thistle |
|---|---|---|
| B. White 2 (1 pen.), Ellis | Report | Angus ×2 |

Basin Reserve, Wellington
Attendance: 4000
Referee: Mr. N. D. Brian

== 1937 Chatham Cup ==
There was no competition in 1937.

Several factors were taken into consideration in the decision to suspend the competition, of which two were significant. A visit by the England amateur side and a major South African rugby tour led to a conflict of possible competition dates, which would have made the organisation and scheduling of matches difficult. The NZFA had also decided that the final should be held in the South Island for the first time; this led to a substantial reduction in the number of contestants, with only twelve teams confirming their entries by the close-off date, none of which were from Auckland.

In truth, the competition had been struggling for several years with the difficulty of arranging dates for matches. Given the entirely amateur nature of the competition, matches were played solely at weekends, and therefore any Chatham Cup matches ate into the available time for local league competitions. There is some indication that not everyone involved in the organisation of regional football was entirely unhappy with the suspension of the competition, though many were, and the remit to suspend it was greeted, according to one contemporary report with "a mixture of apathy and hostility by clubs and followers of the game."

Teams who had expressed their willingness to take part in the 1937 competition were Pukemiro, Wellington Marist, Seatoun, Petone, Scottish Wanderers, Western, Nomads, Christchurch Thistle, Millerton All Blacks, Runanga, Northern, and Invercargill Thistle. A provisional entry from Hamilton Wanderers was also received, but this was later withdrawn.
