= Rockies Incline =

- Coordinates: 41°38′53″S 171°50′54″E
- Country: New Zealand
- Region: West Coast
- District: Buller District

The Rockies Incline was an inclined tramway on the West Coast of the South Island of New Zealand that for ten years from 1925 to 1935 brought coal from the Westport Main Coal Company’s mine on the Millerton-Stockton plateau down to the Westport to Seddonville railway line near sea level.

== History ==
The Rockies Incline was located about 1.3 kilometres (0.81 miles) south of Granity on the West Coast of the South Island of New Zealand. It ran from the Westport Main Coal Company’s Westport Main Mine on a flat-topped ridge at the western edge of the Millerton-Stockton plateau and descended a steep escarpment to the coastal plain near sea level – with a total fall of about 550 metres (1,800 ft) and a length of about 750 metres (2,460 feet).

The mine was commonly known as Rockies Mine, giving its name to the incline.

The Westport Main Mine began production just as underground coal mining on the Millerton-Stockton plateau was reaching its peak, in the mid-1920s. Production of coal at Westport Main began in 1925 and largely ended in 1932, with the onset of the Great Depression, when orders for coal dwindled to almost nothing. A little coal was produced in 1933 and 1935, but the company was then liquidated and the mine and incline abandoned. During its life, the Rockies Incline carried a total of about 187,550 tons of coal.

== The area today ==
There are few traces of the former route of the Rockies Incline visible today.

Mining of the Westport Main Mine coal measures resumed in 1993 as an open-cast mine, operated by Rockies Mining Ltd, with coal being carried off the plateau by truck. Mining paused in 2014.

To the south-east, on the main part of the Millerton-Stockton plateau, are large open-cast mining areas of the Stockton Mine operated by Solid Energy.

== See also ==
- Millerton Incline
- Denniston Incline
- Koranui Incline
