= 1930 Chatham Cup =

Tournament details
- Venue(s): Basin Reserve, Wellington
- Dates: 6 September 1930

Final positions
- Champions: Petone (2nd title)
- Runners-up: Western

The 1930 Chatham Cup was the eighth annual nationwide knockout football competition in New Zealand.

The competition was run on a regional basis, with five regional associations (Auckland, Wellington, Manawatu, Canterbury, and Otago) each holding separate qualifying rounds. In all, "almost 30 teams" took part.

Teams taking part in the final rounds are known to have included Auckland Thistle (who defeated Auckland YMCA in the Auckland regional final), St. Andrews (Manawatu), Petone, and Western (Christchurch). Other teams known to have taken part include Wellington's Hospital AFC, Diamonds, and Waterside; Canterbury's Christchurch Thistle, Nomads, and Rangers; and Dunedin teams Port Chalmers and Northern.

The previous season's winners, Tramways caused something of a sensation when they defaulted their first round match as a protest at having to play under floodlights. Further controversy was caused when the North Island final was awarded in to Petone by forfeiture in questionable circumstances.

== The 1930 final ==
Petone won the title for a second time, having previously won in 1928. In what was, by contemporary reports, an exciting game, Petone had the advantage of the wind at their backs in squally conditions, scoring the only goal of the first half through Dave Craig. In the second half, rain added to the wind to make conditions treacherous. Clarrie Falloon equalised for Western, and then thought they had taken the lead, only to have their second shot ruled out by referee A.E. Caisley. J. Dodds grabbed the winner with only a handful of minutes remaining, and Petone lifted the trophy for the second time, the first team to do so.

== Results ==
=== Quarter-finals ===
19 July 1930
Canterbury Final

Western	3 – 2	Christchurch Thistle
C. Falloon ×2, Nelson, G. Thompson (red card)	Report	Trotter ×2

English Park, Christchurch
Referee: Mr. A. Howarth
27 July 1930
Wellington/Wanganui Final

Petone FC	6 – 0	Kempthorne Prosser
McAuslin, Leslie ×2, Craig ×2, Knox	Report

Basin Reserve, Wellington
Referee: Mr. B. Davis
2 August 1930
Otago Final

Port Chalmers	3 - 2	Northern
Ives, Hutchison ×2	Report	Scoular, McHugh

Logan Park, Dunedin
Referee: Mr. F. G. Smith
21 June 1930
Auckland Final

Auckland Thistle	3 - 0	Auckland Y.M.C.A.
Wilson ×2, Dick	Report

Blandford Park, Auckland
Referee: Mr. A. E. Parkinson

=== Semi-finals ("Island finals") ===
North Island Final
2 August 1930

Auckland Thistle	w/o Petone won by default	Petone FC
	Report

Blandford Park, Auckland
South Island Final
16 August 1930

Port Chalmers	0 - 2	Western
	Report	F, Bridgens, S. Ellis

Logan Park, Dunedin
Referee: Mr. F. G. Smith

=== Final ===
1930 Chatham Cup Final
6 September 1930

Petone FC	2 – 1	Western
Craig, Dodds	,	Falloon

Basin Reserve, Wellington
Referee: Mr. A.E. Caisley
