= Murray Kay =

Scottish-born New Zealand footballer

Personal information
- Full name: George Murray Kay
- Date of birth: 23 November 1905
- Place of birth: Glasgow, Scotland
- Date of death: 12 October 1991 (aged 85)
- Place of death: New Zealand

Senior career*
Years	Team	Apps	(Gls)
ante 1933–1936	Auckland Thistle		
1937	Abels		

International career
1933–1936	New Zealand	4	(1)
- * Club domestic league appearances and goals

George Murray Kay (23 November 1905 – 12 October 1991) was an association football player who represented New Zealand at international level.

Kay made his full All Whites debut in a 2–4 loss to Australia on 5 June 1933 and ended his international playing career with four A-international caps and one goal to his credit, his final cap an appearance in a 1–4 loss to Australia on 18 July 1936.

== Honours ==
Auckland Thistle

- Chatham Cup: 1934; runner-up 1936
