= Denis Smith =

Denis Smith may refer to:

- Denis Smith (English cricketer) (1907–1979), played Test cricket for England
- Denis Smith (footballer, born 1947), English football player and manager
- Denis Smith (footballer, born 1932) (1932–2004), English football player
- Denis Smith (West Indian cricketer) (born 1991), West Indian cricketer from Grenada
- Denis Mack Smith (1920–2017), English historian
- Denis Nayland Smith, a fictional character introduced in the series of novels Dr. Fu Manchu by English author Sax Rohmer

== See also ==
- Denis Smyth (born 1948), professor of history at the University of Toronto
- Dennis Smith (disambiguation)
