= Hastings United =

Hastings United may refer to:

- Hastings United F.C., a football club from Hastings, Sussex, England
- Hastings United F.C. (1948), an earlier Sussex club
- Hastings United AFC, a football club from Hastings, New Zealand
