= Leslie Wood =

Leslie or Les Wood may refer to:

- Leslie Wood (footballer) (born 1932), English goalkeeper
- Leslie Wood (illustrator) (born 1920), English artist
- Les Wood (politician), Australian member of the Queensland Legislative Assembly
- Les Wood (trade unionist) (1920-2010), English trade union leader
- Les Wood (footballer), New Zealand footballer

== See also ==
- Lesley Woods (1910–2003), actress
