= Ron Stone (New Zealand footballer) =

New Zealand footballer

Personal information
- Full name: Ronald Halsey Stone
- Date of birth: 8 April 1913
- Place of birth: New Zealand
- Date of death: 4 September 2006 (aged 93)
- Place of death: Christchurch, New Zealand

Senior career*
Years	Team	Apps	(Gls)
- Glen Innes
- Auckland Thistle

International career
1933	New Zealand	2	(0)
- * Club domestic league appearances and goals

Ronald Halsey Stone (8 April 1913 – 4 September 2006) was an association football player who represented New Zealand at international level. Stone died in Christchurch on 4 September 2006 aged 93.

Stone played two official A-international matches for the New Zealand national team in 1933 against trans-Tasman neighbours Australia as part of a 13 match tour, the first a 4–6 loss on 17 June 1933, followed by a 2–4 loss on 24 June.
