= Cliff Banham =

New Zealand footballer

Personal information
- Full name: Cliff Banham
- Place of birth: New Zealand
- Position: Defender

Senior career*
Years	Team	Apps	(Gls)
- Auckland Thistle

International career
1952	New Zealand	4	(0)
- * Club domestic league appearances and goals

Cliff Banham is a former association football player who represented New Zealand at international level.

Banham made his full All Whites debut in a 9–0 win over Fiji on 14 September 1952 and ended his international playing career with four A-international caps to his credit, his final cap an appearance in a 5–3 win over Tahiti on 28 September 1952.
