= George McAnulty =

New Zealand footballer

Personal information
- Full name: George G B McAnulty
- Place of birth: New Zealand

Senior career*
Years	Team	Apps	(Gls)
- Christchurch Thistle

International career
1952	New Zealand	1	(0)
- * Club domestic league appearances and goals

George McAnulty is a former association football player who represented New Zealand at international level.

McAnulty made a solitary official international appearance for New Zealand in a 2–0 win over Fiji on 7 September 1952.
