= Waimangaroa River =

River in New Zealand

Coordinates: 41°42′S 171°45′E

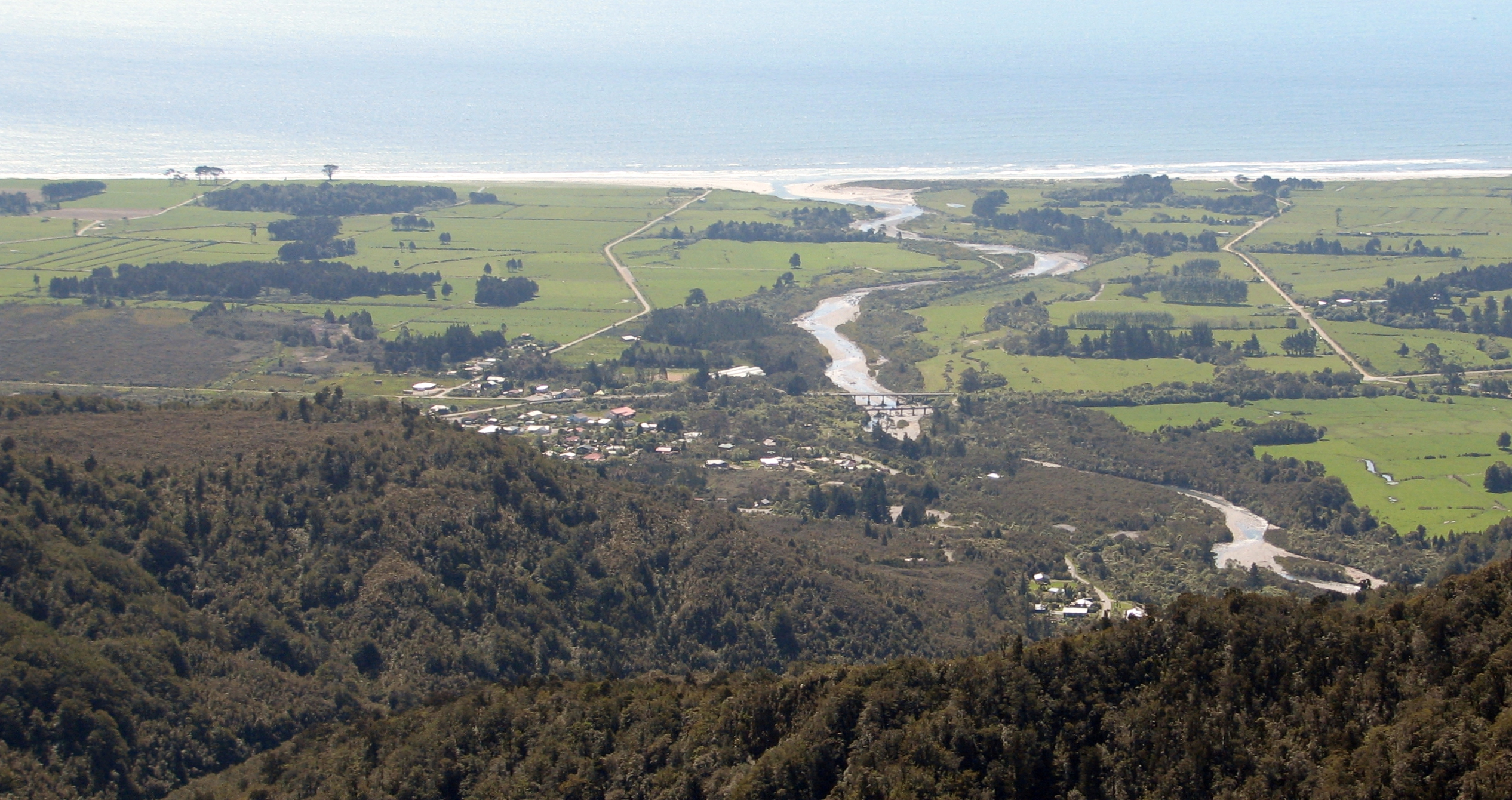
The Waimangaroa River flowing past Waimangaroa to sea, as viewed from the Denniston road

The Waimangaroa River is located on the West Coast of New Zealand.

The river passes through tussock, scrub and forested areas before draining into the Karamea Bight in the Tasman Sea. It passes through the town of Waimangaroa and is crossed by the Ngakawau Branch railway, with the rail bridge brought into service in 1877. That year, the Conns Creek Branch opened, a sub-branch line that closely followed the southern bank of the river east from Waimangaroa to the foot of the Denniston Incline. It closed in 1967.
