= Conns Creek Branch =

Railway in New Zealand's South Island

Map

The Conns Creek Branch was a 2.7 kilometre (1.7 mile) branch line railway in the West Coast region of New Zealand's South Island. It diverged from the Seddonville Branch at Waimangaroa and followed the southern bank of the Waimangaroa River to the line's terminus at Conns Creek at the foot of the Denniston Incline. The line operated from 24 October 1879 until 16 August 1967 and existed for the sole purpose of conveying coal from mines to the port of Westport.

== Construction ==
Construction of the Seddonville Branch railway from Westport to Seddonville had begun in 1874. In September 1875 the Wellington Coal Mining Company called for tenders for a private line from a junction with the Seddonville branch at Waimangaroa to a site 1.6 kilometres (1 mile) up the Waimangaroa River adjacent to the company's mine. The Seddonville Branch was completed as far as Waimangaroa on 5 August 1876 and the first portion of the Conns Creek Branch - as far as the Wellington Mine - opened in 1877. A bridge across the river connected the then terminus of the branch on the south bank with the Wellington Mine on the north bank.

In 1877, good quality coal was found high on the Mount Rochfort Plateau and the Westport Colliery Company was formed to exploit it. Tenders to extend the Wellington Coal Mining Company's railway by 1.1 kilometres (0.7 miles), and build the Denniston Incline, closed on 30 April 1878. The extension to the new terminus at Conns Creek at the foot of the Denniston Incline was ready for running in February 1879, and in April 1880 the Denniston Incline began operation.

== Ownership ==
Ownership of different parts of this short branch line changed many times.

The lower 1.6 kilometre (1 mile) section from Waimangaroa was owned by the Wellington Coal Mining Company from the line's opening in 1877 until 1880, when the company folded. The line was then bought by the Koranui Coal Mining Company, which was building the Koranui Incline from the north bank of the Waimangaroa River, adjacent to the Wellington Mine, up Simms Spur to access its mine on Mt Frederick. This lower part of the line was bought by the Union Steam Ship Company of New Zealand on 1 August 1885, and then by the Westport Coal Company (which operated the nearby Denniston Incline) in February 1887. Prior to 1887, the Westport Coal Company had to pay high fees to carry coal over this part of the line, first to the Wellington Coal Mining Company and Koranui Coal Mining Company, then to the Union Steam Ship Company; ownership released the company from this difficulty.

The upper 1.1 kilometre (0.7 mile) section to Conns Creek was owned by the Westport Colliery Company (which was reformed into the Westport Coal Company in 1881) from its opening in 1879 until 1948.

In 1948, the whole 2.7 kilometre (1.7 mile) Conns Creek Branch was taken over by the New Zealand State Mines Department, and on 25 September 1958 ownership passed to New Zealand Railways.

== Operation ==
The Conns Creek Branch was operated throughout its life by the New Zealand Railways Department (NZR), which also supplied all locomotives and rolling stock. It was a steep line, with a ruling grade of 1 in 37.

Motive power on the branch was always provided by steam locomotives. Traffic other than coal being conveyed to the harbour in Westport was insignificant. At the start of the 20th century, four trains operated each way daily; these were initially mixed trains as provisions were made to convey passengers (a passenger carriage attached to each train). These were removed in 1931 and the line became goods only.

For most of its life, essentially all traffic on the Conns Creek Branch was to or from the Denniston Incline. The Wellington Coal Mining Company's mine was unsuccessful and closed in 1880. From October 1882 until the beginning of 1887, coal from the Koranui Coal Mining Company's mine on Mount Frederick was brought – via the Koranui Incline and a bridge over the river – to sidings 1.2 kilometres (0.75 miles) up the branch. The Koranui mine and incline closed in 1887.

Traffic was in significant decline by the time the railway passed into NZR ownership, and trains no longer ran through to Westport; a shunting locomotive based in Waimangaroa shuttled wagons up and down the branch, and Seddonville Branch trains took the wagons between Waimangaroa and Westport. The Denniston Incline closed on 16 August 1967, and much of the Conns Creek Branch subsequently closed in November 1967. A one kilometre long portion to a location known as East Backshunt (essentially a long siding from the Waimangaroa yard) was retained to receive coal carried by truck from the Denniston plateau. This operated for only a short time before being closed and the track lifted.

== The branch today ==
Although remnants of closed railways deteriorate and disappear over time due to natural and human activity, some remains of the Conns Creek Branch still exist. Some of the old formation is still visible and a road to the foot of the Denniston Incline follows it for 1.3 kilometres (0.8 miles). At the Conns Creek terminus are a couple of 'Q' class coal wagons (hopper wagons of the type used on the incline), a crane, stone retaining walls, and other relics. From this point, the remains of the incline extend up to Denniston.
