= Dennis Smith (New Zealand footballer) =

New Zealand footballer

Personal information
- Full name: Dennis Smith
- Place of birth: New Zealand

Senior career*
Years	Team	Apps	(Gls)
- Auckland Thistle

International career
1952	New Zealand	5	(0)
- * Club domestic league appearances and goals

Dennis Smith is a former football (soccer) player who represented New Zealand at international level.

Smith made his full All Whites debut in a 2–0 win over Fiji on 7 September 1952 and ended his international playing career with five A-international caps and two goals to his credit, his final cap an appearance in a 5–3 win over Tahiti on 28 September 1952.
