= George Wright (New Zealand footballer) =

New Zealand footballer

Personal information
- Full name: George Wright
- Place of birth: New Zealand

Senior career*
Years	Team	Apps	(Gls)
- Ponsonby
- Auckland Thistle

International career
1936	New Zealand	1	(0)
- * Club domestic league appearances and goals

George Wright was a former football (soccer) player who represented New Zealand at international level.

Wright made a single appearance in an official international for the All Whites in a 1–4 loss to Australia on 18 July 1936.
