= Jim Campbell (New Zealand footballer) =

New Zealand footballer

Personal information
- Full name: James M Campbell
- Place of birth: New Zealand

Senior career*
Years	Team	Apps	(Gls)
- Petone

International career
1927	New Zealand	2	(0)
- * Club domestic league appearances and goals

James Campbell is a former association football player who represented New Zealand at international level.

Campbell played two official A-international matches for the All Whites in 1927, both against the touring Canadians, the first a 1–0 win on 9 July 1927, the second a 4–1 loss on 23 July.
