= Wallsend, New Zealand =

Wallsend
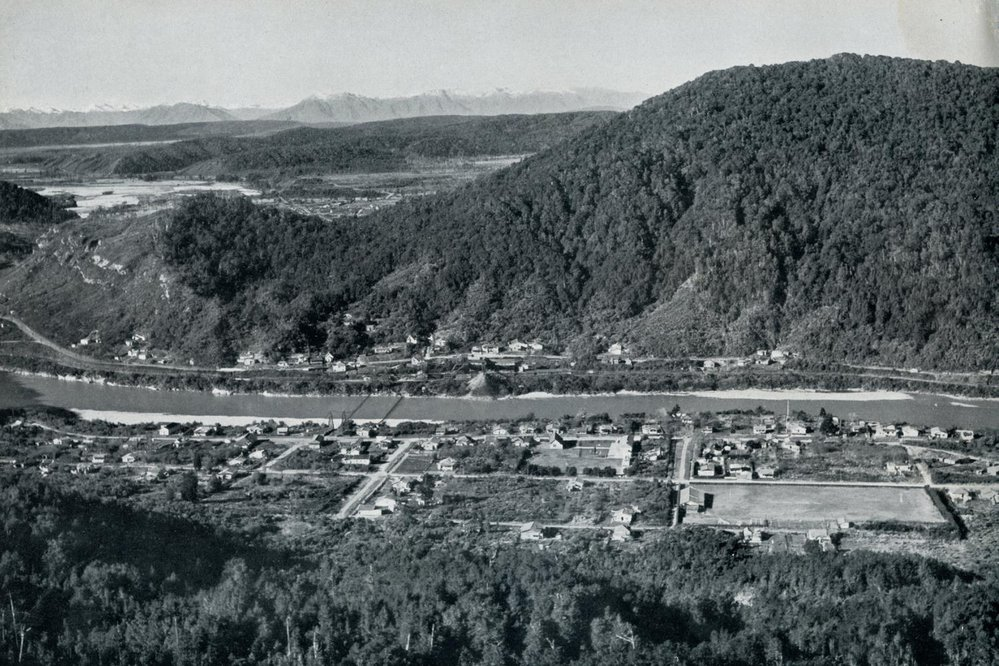
- Taylorville (foreground) and Wallsend (far side of Grey River)

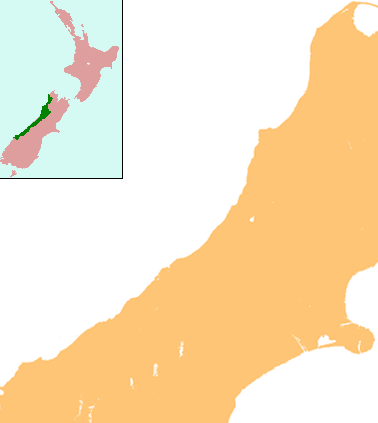
- Location within West Coast
- Coordinates: 42°26′21.52″S 171°19′14.41″E
- Country: New Zealand
- Region: West Coast
- District: Grey District
- Local iwi: Ngāi Tahu

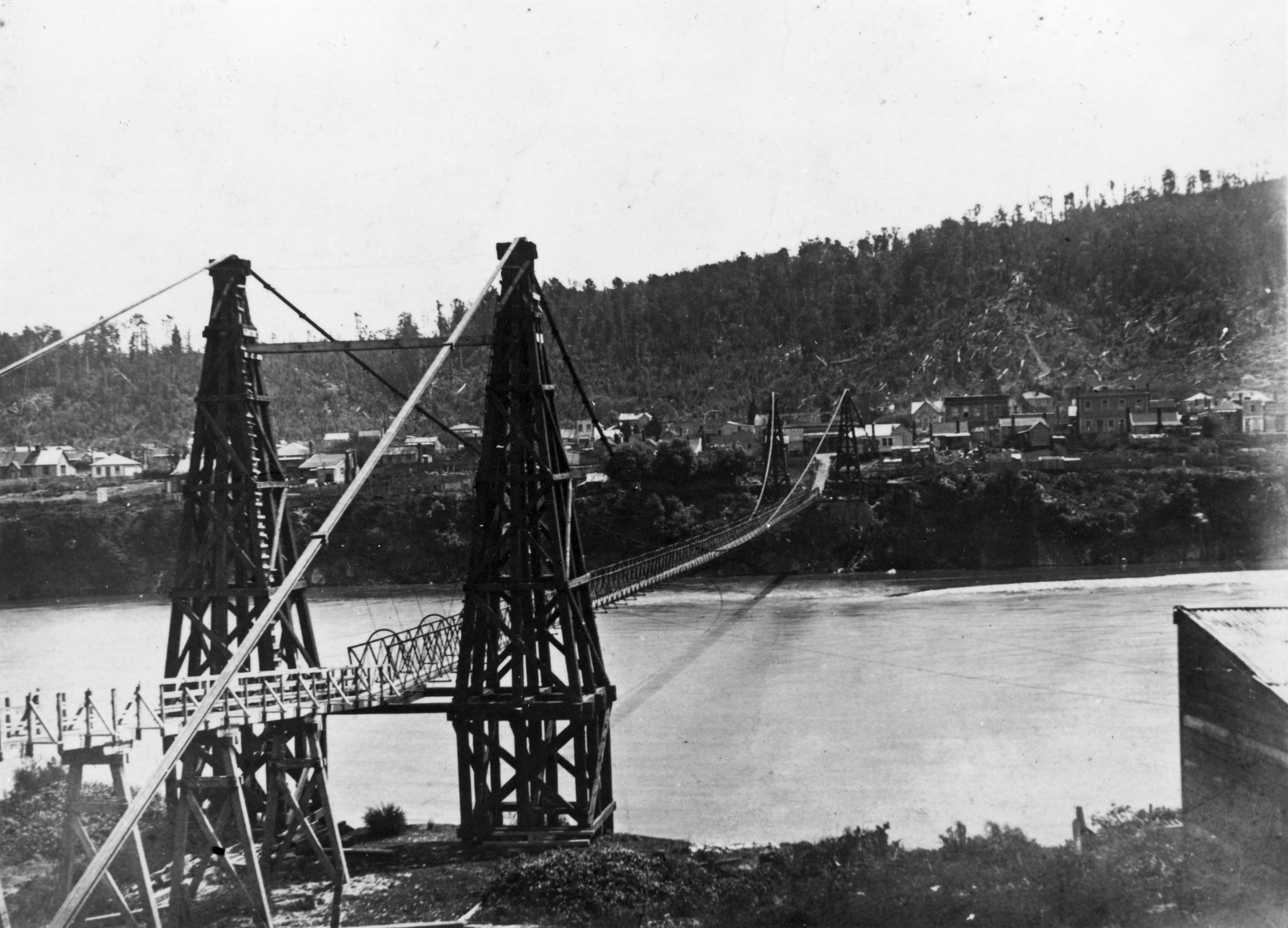
Taylorville bridge as seen from the Wallsend side

Wallsend is a locality in the West Coast region of New Zealand, located on the south side of the Grey River. It is located opposite Taylorville. The two settlements were connected via a suspension bridge for pedestrians that was known as the Taylorville bridge.

The church in Wallsend was St Saviour's.

In a large fire on 4 January 1933, the Union Hotel (where the fire started), the Empire Hotel, a billiard room, the library and a private house were destroyed. Another hotel, the Albion, burned down on 31 August 1934. The Wentworth Hall, principally used for dances and built in 1935, burned down on 1 August 1936.
