= Denniston, New Zealand =

Denniston
- Location within New Zealand
- Coordinates: 41°43′53″S 171°47′22″E
- Country: New Zealand
- Region: West Coast
- District: Buller District
- Electorates: West Coast-Tasman; Te Tai Tonga

Denniston is a small settlement, 15 kilometres (9 miles) east of Westport, on the West Coast of the South Island of New Zealand. It is situated on the Denniston Plateau, 600 metres (2,000 ft) above sea level in the Papahaua Ranges.

It is named for R. B. Denniston, manager of the first major mine to open on the West Coast in the 1870s. During the first few decades of the 20th century, up to 1,400 people lived in the townships on the Denniston Plateau, to service the large coal mines there. Coal was transported in railway wagons from the plateau via the Denniston Incline to Conns Creek, where steam locomotives of New Zealand Railways took coal trains to the port of Westport.

The Denniston Incline closed on 16 August 1967. The plateau now has a population of fewer than 10 people, and virtually all the buildings and structures are gone, although many historical relics remain – scattered throughout the plateau and incline area amongst the scrub vegetation.

The open-cast Escarpment Mine Project was established by Bathurst Resources in an area of 200 hectares of conservation land on the southern Denniston Plateau. Mining commenced in 2014, but was suspended in 2016 in response to the closure in June of the Holcim cement works at Cape Foulwind and a decline in global prices for hard coking coal.

== Overview ==
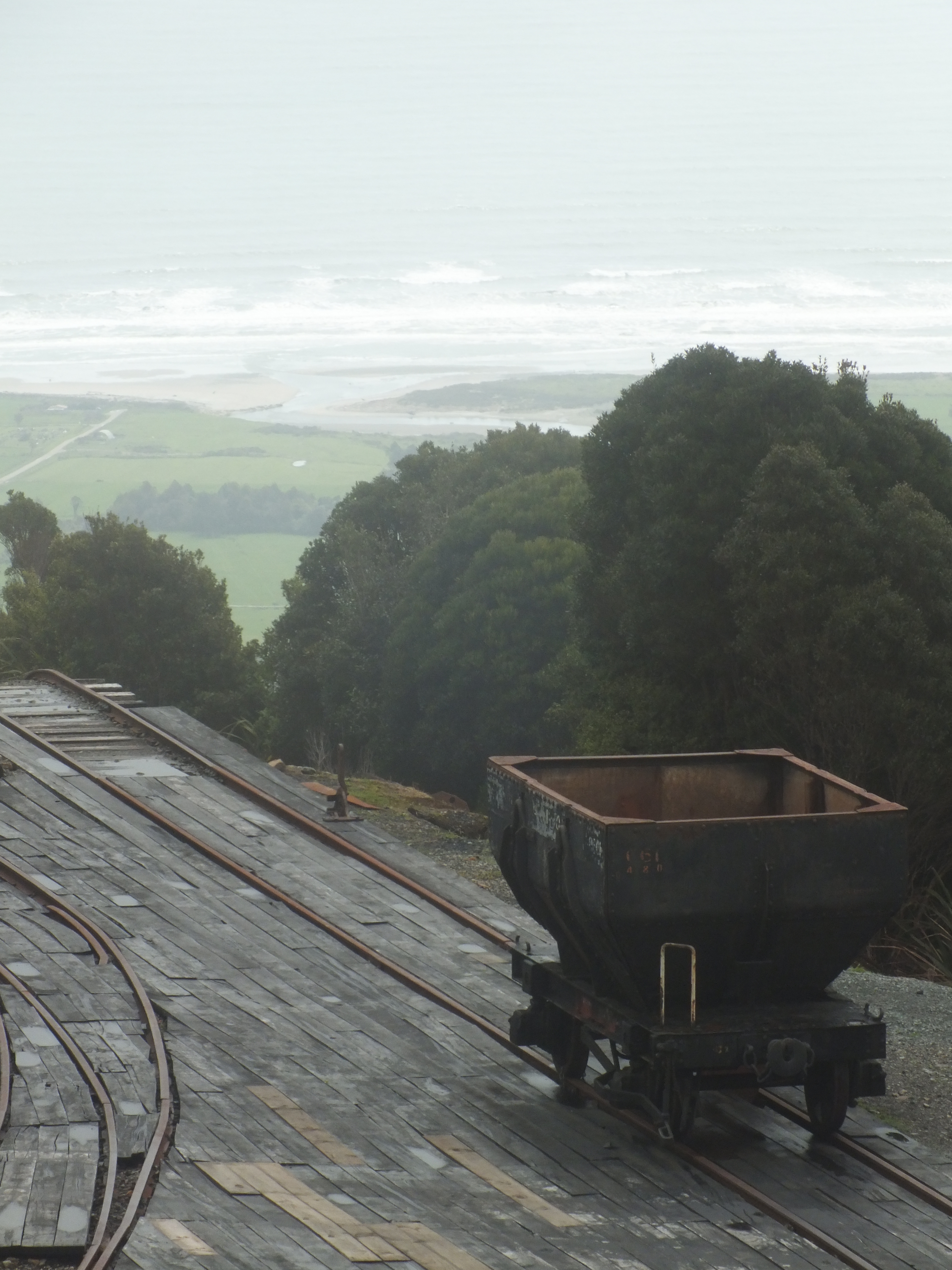
Top of Denniston Incline in 2013

The townships of the Denniston Plateau, and the Denniston Incline itself, existed solely to extract coal from the plateau. Living conditions at Denniston were harsh; the rocky, windswept plateau is often immersed in cloud, receives a high annual rainfall, and very low temperatures are common. Once good road access to the plateau was established and the demand for coal declined, the townships shrank – and disappeared altogether once the incline and mines closed. A former schoolhouse, now used as a museum, is one of the few buildings remaining. Very few people now live on the plateau but the area is of increasing interest to tourists interested in its history. Future opencast mining is a possibility.

The setting and history of Denniston is similar to that of Millerton, located on a similar plateau 12 kilometres (7.5 miles) to the north.

== History ==
=== The Westport Coal Company ===
The Westport Colliery Company, predecessor to the Westport Coal Company, was formed in 1878 to mine the high quality coal on the Mount Rochfort plateau, commonly known as the Denniston Plateau. To access the coal, the company extended the nearby Wellington Coal Company's branch railway on the south bank of the Waimangaroa River by 1.1 kilometres (0.68 miles) to Conns Creek, and constructed the Denniston Incline, and the roperoads from the mines to the top of the incline. To raise additional capital to develop the mines further, the Westport Colliery Company was reformed into the Westport Coal Company in 1881. The company also operated mines in other places on the West Coast, including Millerton, and by 1905, the company was by far the largest coal producer in New Zealand. The Westport Coal Company's mines and the Denniston Incline were taken over by the New Zealand State Mines Department in 1948.

=== Denniston Incline ===
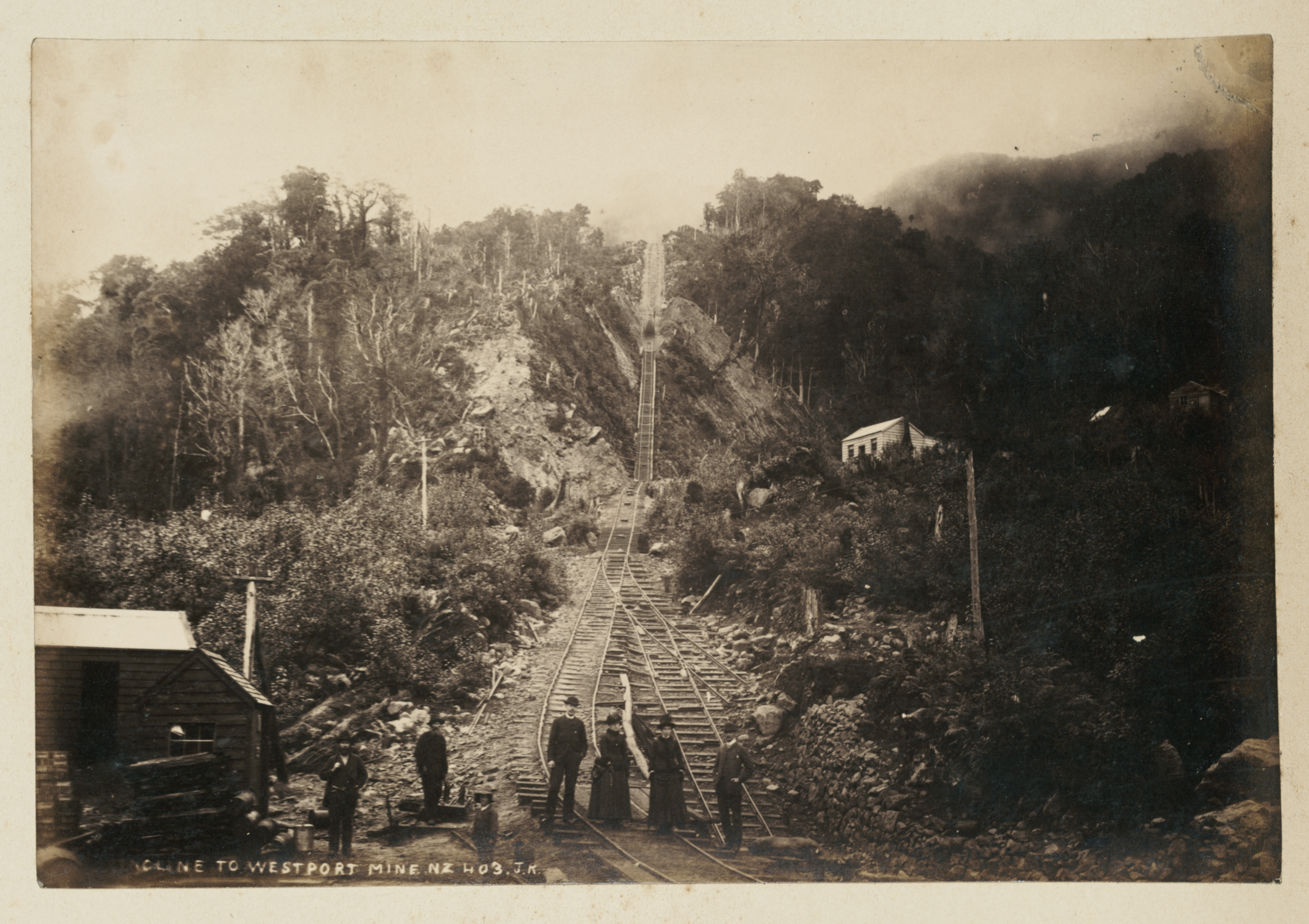
Bottom of Denniston Incline, c.1880s–90s.

The Denniston Incline began operation in April 1880. It was a self-acting ropeway that used gravity to lower 12.5 ton gross laden weight New Zealand Railways' coal wagons one at a time from Brakehead, at Denniston, at the top to Conns Creek below. Each descending wagon hauled an empty one up the incline by means of wire ropes, each wagon attached to its own rope and brake drum. The two drums were mounted beside each other on a common shaft, and the wire rope wound in opposite directions on each drum. So while one drum was letting the rope out and lowering a full wagon down the incline, the other drum was winding its rope in and pulling an empty wagon up the incline. Hydraulic pistons slowed the rotation of the winding drums to control the speed of the wagons.

The Denniston Incline was actually two inclines. The higher of the two began at Brakehead, and descended steeply to the appropriately named Middle Brake. Here wagons were disconnected from the first incline's rope, and placed on the rope of the second incline for a more gentle descent to Conns Creek, where the accumulated wagons would then be marshalled into trains before being taken to Westport. The drum from Middle Brake is now on display at Westport's Coaltown Museum.

The upper part of each incline had essentially two sets of railway tracks side by side (three rails, with the inner rail shared by both tracks), while below the midsection of each incline (where wagons passed each other) the two sets of track were 'interwoven'. Each side of the inclines alternately had wagons ascending and descending – otherwise the ropes would get crossed over. (An image of a full wagon descending the upper part of one incline can be seen below in External links.) The southern side of the inclines was called the 'Company Side', as that was the side the company offices were located on; the northern side of the inclines was called the 'Donkey Side'.

The system did not always function as intended and collisions, derailments and runaways were not unknown. The remains of several wrecked wagons still lie beside, or even some distance from, the incline formation.

The Denniston Incline fell a total of 516 metres (1,693 feet) in 1,670 metres (83 chains or 1.04 miles), with some sections having gradients steeper than 1 in 1.3. The short-lived Koranui Incline on the other side of the valley was higher, with a total fall of 700 metres (2,300 feet), and over twice as long as the Denniston Incline, with a length of 3.6 kilometres (2.2 miles).

Wagons could be delivered from Denniston to Conns Creek at a rate of 12 to 18 wagons per hour. The track gauge was the standard NZR track gauge of 3 ft 6 in (1,067 mm). The railway wagons used on the incline were mainly the common "Q" class hopper wagons, the hoppers of which could be detached from their wagon bodies and lifted by wharf crane over the hold of a ship, and the bottom discharge doors of the wagons then opened manually to discharge coal into the ships' holds. (Two images of a crane lifting a hopper out of a wagon and over a ship's hold can be seen below in External links.)

=== The mines and roperoads ===
The mines on the Denniston Plateau included the Banbury, Ironbridge, Coalbrookdale, Whareatea, and Sullivan mines. The first mine was the Banbury, which began production in 1880. A double track 0.61-metre (2-foot) gauge 560-metre long horse tramway was built from the top of the incline to the Banbury Mine above the Waimangaroa Gorge to carry coal from the mine to the top of the incline. Later, horse-power was replaced by a steam engine-powered moving endless rope to which mine tubs were hooked by chains for their journeys to and from the bins at Brakehead. By 1889, the double track tramway (now called a roperoad) had been extended through and beyond the Banbury Mine, past the Ironbrook Mine and on to the Coalbrookdale Mine—a distance of about 2.4 kilometres (1.5 miles). The roperoad system was renewed along a partly new alignment between 1900 and 1904. (An image of one of these roperoads can be seen below in External links.)

In 1952, a monocable aerial ropeway 4 kilometres (2.5 miles) in length was commissioned (with buckets carrying coal suspended from the rope) to carry coal from the new Whareata and Sullivan mines to Brakehead, and the roperoad was abandoned. The Coalbrookdale and Ironbridge mines had reached the end of their economic lives and closed in 1944 and 1945 respectively; Banbury Mine had closed in 1890.

The Westport Coal Company's coal production from the Denniston Plateau increased to an annual peak in 1910, when 464 men working underground produced 348,335 tons of coal. Production then declined. In all, the incline carried an estimated 12.6 million tons of coal during its life. Some mining continued and the Escarpment Mine operated from 1964 to 1982.

=== The townships and people ===
There were three main townships on the Denniston Plateau – Denniston, Burnett's Face, and Coalbrookdale. There were no roads connecting the townships, and everyone walked alongside the roperoads to move about. The population of the plateau as a whole peaked in 1911, at just over 1,400 inhabitants (the population of Denniston township peaked later, in 1926).

==== Denniston ====
The first settlement, known as "The Camp", was located on a rock ledge above the Waimangaroa River. It was built below the level of the plateau between two escarpments for protection from relentless winds. The first workers developed the Banbury Mine, but many did not stay long owing to the inhospitable conditions. However, by 1883 there were about a hundred residents, a school, and a brass band. The company's offices were above The Camp and Brakehead, alongside the tramway from the mine to the top of the incline.

A bridle track was built between Waimangaroa and Denniston by 1885. Prior to this, the only access for people and goods had been to ride in coal wagons travelling at high speed up or down the incline.

Settlement soon spread up onto the plateau itself, and by 1887, there were three hotels, a postal and telegraph office, four general stores, three butchers and three bakers in Denniston. Living conditions were squalid and visitors complained about the unsanitary and 'smelly' nature of the township. The cottages were utilitarian small wooden buildings with roofs and chimneys of corrugated iron. There was no running water, no baths in houses, and toilets were tin sheds with cans that were emptied by night cart men. Large families were often confined to two-room huts for long periods during bad weather. There were no shrubs, flowers or gardens. Even after 20 years, these poor living conditions still prevailed.

Denniston played a key role in the development of the union movement in New Zealand, and the country's first miner's union was formed at Denniston in 1884. A report to the coal industry in 1919 attributed much of the industrial unrest and dissatisfaction of the Denniston miners to their 'sordid' living conditions.

Denniston had a communal recreation and sports ground, its own sports clubs and Returned Services Association, and churches included Presbyterian, Methodist, Anglican, Roman Catholic, and Salvation Army. There were five lodges (Masonic, Druids, Odd Fellows, Orange and Buffaloes). In the days before social welfare, in an isolated community on low hourly wages, churches, unions, friendly societies and lodges provided important security for their members. Miners had formed their own Medical Association in 1883 (a doctor was contracted to visit Denniston twice a week) and an Accident and Relief Fund Association was formed in 1890. A hospital, which opened in 1910 – paid for by subscriptions, levies and fundraising efforts – was built in a central location to deal with emergencies from mines in all directions. Denniston did not have a cemetery as the ground was too hard; bodies were transported from Denniston to Waimangaroa for burial, initially down the Denniston Incline and later by road.

The peak of population came in 1926, when there were 910 living in the township. During the 1932–35 Depression, and after World War 2, people began to move away from Denniston, with many houses being moved in sections for re-erection at Waimangaroa or Westport. For the remaining workers, the provision of buses enabled them and their families to live in more pleasant conditions down on the coastal plain. The school, last shop, and last hotel (the Red Dog Saloon, owned by Johnny Cotter) closed in the 1960s, and the Post Office closed in 1971. The last lodge, the Buffaloes Lodge, closed in 1996 – though by then it had relocated from Denniston to the former Waimangaroa RSA rooms.

==== Burnett's Face ====
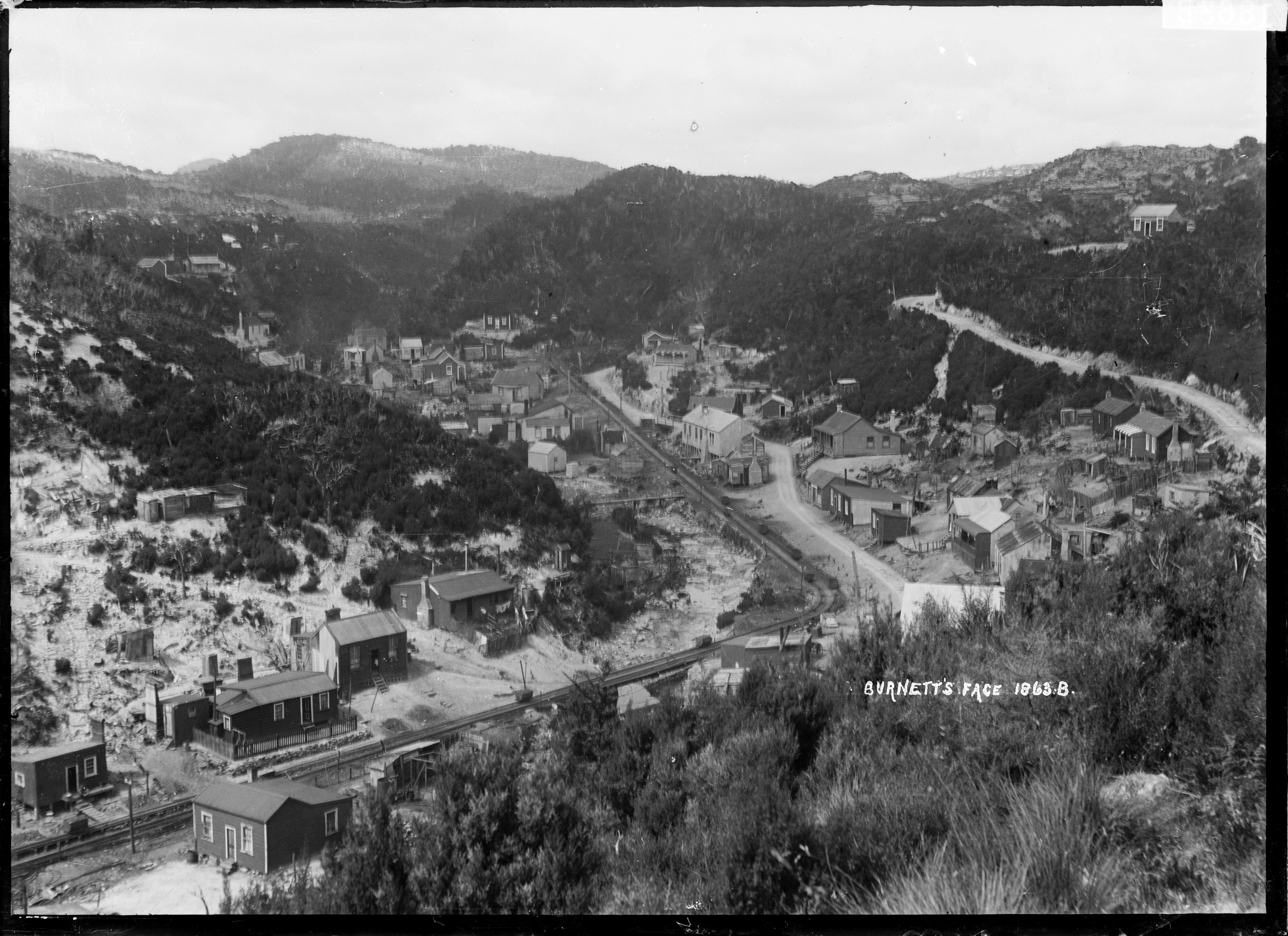
The coal-mining settlement of Burnett's Face (circa 1910)

The development of the Ironbridge Mine led to the establishment of the settlement known as Burnett's Face, about 2 kilometres southeast from Denniston. It was initially a cluster of tents, but by 1891 there were wooden cottages, a school, two hotels, a butchery, a bakery, several stores, two halls, and two billiard saloons. Its main road was the constantly running roperoad skipway linking the mine with the bins at the head of the Denniston Incline. By the 1950s, little remained of the settlement.

==== Coalbrookdale ====
Another township, Coalbrookdale, stretched for several hundred metres along sides of the roperoad in the lower Coalbrookdale Valley, southwest of Burnett's Face. There were about 21 buildings in Coalbrookdale in 1891, and the population peaked in 1896 when there were 165 people living in the valley. There was a licensed hotel from 1894 to c.1921. The last permanent resident departed in 1956.

=== Decline and closure ===
The community at Denniston served no other purpose than to support the operations of the coal mines and the incline. Once a usable road was put through from Waimangaroa to the plateau, people started to drift away from the plateau to the warmer climate of Waimangaroa or Westport below.

By the 1960s, demand for coal was falling and the Denniston Incline closed on 16 August 1967. The Conns Creek branch, which connected to the foot of the incline, was cut back to become a 1-kilometre (0.62-mile) long spur siding where the coal carried by truck from the bins at Brakehead was transferred into railway wagons. A few months later, in 1968, the aerial ropeway from the mines also closed in favour of trucking of coal down the hill directly from the mines. In May 1968, the Inangahua earthquake caused much damage to the incline, making the closure irreversible. Thus, what was once described as the "Eighth Wonder of the World" by locals, faded into history.

== Denniston Plateau today ==
=== Heritage preservation ===
Little remains of the incline or the townships on the plateau but relics can be found throughout the area. Middle Brake is one of the most intact industrial areas remaining because its inaccessibility resulted in much equipment being left on site. At Brakehead and Denniston township, the main street grid, building foundations, chimneys, and the square water tanks that many houses had, are the main relics that can be seen. Most of the former building sites are empty and covered in low scrub and only a few buildings still stand. The former high school is occupied by the Friends of the Hill and is used as a museum and information centre. Other remaining buildings are now privately owned.

Denniston is listed as a Category 1 Historic Place on the New Zealand Heritage List, and considered to have special or outstanding historical or cultural significance or value.

The Denniston Incline and the key historical areas of the plateau are now managed by the New Zealand Department of Conservation. At Brakehead, replicas have been built of some of the former trackwork and three original Q wagons placed on the site.

With recognition of the historic nature of Denniston and its increasing status as a local tourist icon and one that is close to Westport, a group of mainly locals, The Friends of the Hill, seek to preserve Denniston's heritage and interpret it for the benefit of people visiting one of New Zealand's most famous coalfield settlements. The growth of interest in Denniston has been aided by The Denniston Rose, a historical novel by Jenny Pattrick, set in the 1880s at Denniston.

=== Future mining ===
Coal is still mined on the Denniston Plateau, at a small scale, and 9 kilometres (5.6 miles) to the north at the Stockton Mine near Millerton. In 2010, Bathurst Resources announced the Escarpment Mine Project to mine for coal on the Denniston Plateau, a move strongly opposed by environmentalists.

In March 2013 the Environment Court gave Bathurst the go-ahead, though groups such as Forest & Bird vowed to continue fighting.

== Demographics ==
Denniston locality covers 353.32 km^{2} (136.42 sq mi). It is part of the larger Buller Coalfields statistical area.

Historical population
Year	Pop.	±% p.a.
2006	102	—
2013	144	+5.05%
2018	147	+0.41%
2023	183	+4.48%
The 2006 population is for a smaller area of 344.86 km^{2}. Source:

Denniston had a population of 183 in the 2023 New Zealand census, an increase of 36 people (24.5%) since the 2018 census, and an increase of 39 people (27.1%) since the 2013 census. There were 90 males and 96 females in 81 dwellings. 1.6% of people identified as LGBTIQ+. The median age was 46.9 years (compared with 38.1 years nationally). There were 36 people (19.7%) aged under 15 years, 15 (8.2%) aged 15 to 29, 93 (50.8%) aged 30 to 64, and 39 (21.3%) aged 65 or older.

People could identify as more than one ethnicity. The results were 91.8% European (Pākehā), 14.8% Māori, 1.6% Pasifika, 6.6% Asian, and 3.3% other, which includes people giving their ethnicity as "New Zealander". English was spoken by 98.4%, Māori by 3.3%, and other languages by 4.9%. No language could be spoken by 1.6% (e.g. too young to talk). The percentage of people born overseas was 13.1, compared with 28.8% nationally.

Religious affiliations were 19.7% Christian, 1.6% New Age, and 1.6% other religions. People who answered that they had no religion were 67.2%, and 11.5% of people did not answer the census question.

Of those at least 15 years old, 12 (8.2%) people had a bachelor's or higher degree, 81 (55.1%) had a post-high school certificate or diploma, and 45 (30.6%) people exclusively held high school qualifications. The median income was $30,700, compared with $41,500 nationally. 15 people (10.2%) earned over $100,000 compared to 12.1% nationally. The employment status of those at least 15 was 72 (49.0%) full-time and 21 (14.3%) part-time.

== See also ==
- Koranui Incline
- Millerton Incline
- Rockies Incline
