= Andrew Leslie (footballer) =

Scottish footballer

Personal information
- Full name: Andrew Robertson Leslie
- Date of birth: 12 April 1892
- Place of birth: Govan, Scotland
- Position: Wing half

Senior career*
Years	Team	Apps	(Gls)
1914–1919	Queen's Park	10	(0)
- * Club domestic league appearances and goals

Andrew Robertson Leslie was a Scottish amateur footballer who played as a wing half in the Scottish League for Queen's Park.

== Personal life ==
As of 1911, Leslie was an apprentice engineer. Leslie served as a lance corporal in the Highland Light Infantry during the First World War and was wounded in August 1916. He was later commissioned as a second lieutenant in the London Regiment.

== Career statistics ==
Appearances and goals by club, season and competition
Club	Season	League			National Cup		Other		Total	
Club	Season	Division	Apps	Goals	Apps	Goals	Apps	Goals	Apps	Goals
Queen's Park	1914–15	Scottish First Division	3	0	—		1 (Note: Appearance in Glasgow Merchants Charity Cup)	0	4	0
Queen's Park	1915–16	Scottish First Division	4	0	—		1 (Note: Appearance in Glasgow Cup)	0	5	0
Queen's Park	1917–18	Scottish First Division	1	0	—		1	0	2	0
Queen's Park	1918–19	Scottish First Division	2	0	—		0	0	2	0
Career total			10	0	—		3	0	13	0
