= Fred Craggs =

New Zealand footballer

Personal information
- Full name: Fred Craggs
- Place of birth: New Zealand

Senior career*
| Years | Team | Apps | (Gls) |
- Technical Old Boys

International career
| 1936 | New Zealand | 1 | (0) |
- * Club domestic league appearances and goals

Fred Craggs is a former association football player who represented New Zealand at international level.

Craggs made a single appearance in an official international for the All Whites in a 1–7 loss to Australia on 4 July 1936.
