= Dennis Smith (Australian footballer) =

Australian rules footballer

Personal information
- Full name: Dennis Smith
- Born: 1 February 1939
- Died: 30 July 2017 (aged 78)
- Original team: Myrtleford
- Height: 183 cm (6 ft 0 in)
- Weight: 86 kg (190 lb)
- Position: half backline

Playing career^{1}
Years	Club	Games (Goals)
1955-59, 1961-68	Myrtleford	175 (?)
1960–1961	Richmond	13 (1)
- ^{1} Playing statistics correct to the end of 1968.

Career highlights
- Myrtleford best & fairest: 1958

Dennis Smith (1 February 1939 – 30 July 2017) was an Australian rules footballer who played for the Richmond Football Club in the Victorian Football League (VFL).
