= Syd Haines =

New Zealand footballer

Personal information
- Full name: Sydney V Haines
- Place of birth: New Zealand

Senior career*
Years	Team	Apps	(Gls)
- Petone

International career
1936	New Zealand	1	(0)
- * Club domestic league appearances and goals

Sydney Haines is a former association football player who represented New Zealand at international level.

Haines made a single appearance in an official international for the All Whites in a 1–10 loss to Australia on 11 July 1936. Although New Zealand have been beaten by more in unofficial matches, notably England Amateurs in 1937 and Manchester United in 1967, it remains New Zealand's heaviest defeat in official internationals.
