= Hastings United AFC =

Hastings United was an association football club from Hastings, New Zealand.

== History ==
The original Hastings United formed in 1908 after a meeting held at the Carlton Club Hotel with Sir William Russell elected as a club Patron and Mr. J. D. Rivers elected as the club president. This older side was one of Hawke's Bay's stronger sides, reaching the quarter-finals of the 1928 Chatham Cup. The club was later re-established in 1947 as the result of a merger of several older clubs, one of which was the original Hastings United. The club was briefly known as Hastings Leopard from 1968, before changing their name to Leopard United in 1970 after merging with Shamrock. Leopard United qualified and competed in the 1974 Central League Third Division and were promoted to Division Two in 1975. The club's name was finally changed to Hastings City in 1976. The club was later disbanded in 1980.

The later incarnation of Hastings United/Hastings Leopard reached later rounds of the Chatham Cup in 1963, 1965, and 1969, and Leopard United did the same in 1970, 1971, 1972, and 1973.

Note that the club should not be confused with an earlier team called Hastings City which competed in the 1962 Chatham Cup.
