= Denis Smith (footballer, born 1932) =

English footballer (1932–2004)

Personal information
- Full name: Denis Noel Smith
- Date of birth: 23 December 1932
- Place of birth: Grimsby, England
- Date of death: 2004 (aged 71–72)
- Place of death: North East Lincolnshire, England
- Height: 5 ft 9 in (1.75 m)
- Position: Full-back

Senior career*
Years	Team	Apps	(Gls)
1950–1954	Grimsby Town	4	(0)
1957–195?	Goole Town		
- * Club domestic league appearances and goals

Denis Noel Smith (23 December 1932 – 2004) was an English professional footballer who played as a full-back.

Smith died in North East Lincolnshire in 2004.
