= Tom McCormack (footballer) =

New Zealand footballer

Personal information
- Full name: Thomas McCormack
- Place of birth: New Zealand

Senior career*
Years	Team	Apps	(Gls)
- Northern
- Seacliff

International career
1927	New Zealand	2	(1)
- * Club domestic league appearances and goals

Thomas McCormack is a former association footballer who represented New Zealand at international level.

McCormack played two official A-international matches for the All Whites in 1927, both against the touring Canadians, the first a 1–0 win on 9 July 1927 with McCormack the scorer, the second a 1–4 loss on 23 July.
