= Taylorville, New Zealand =

Town in New Zealand

Taylorville
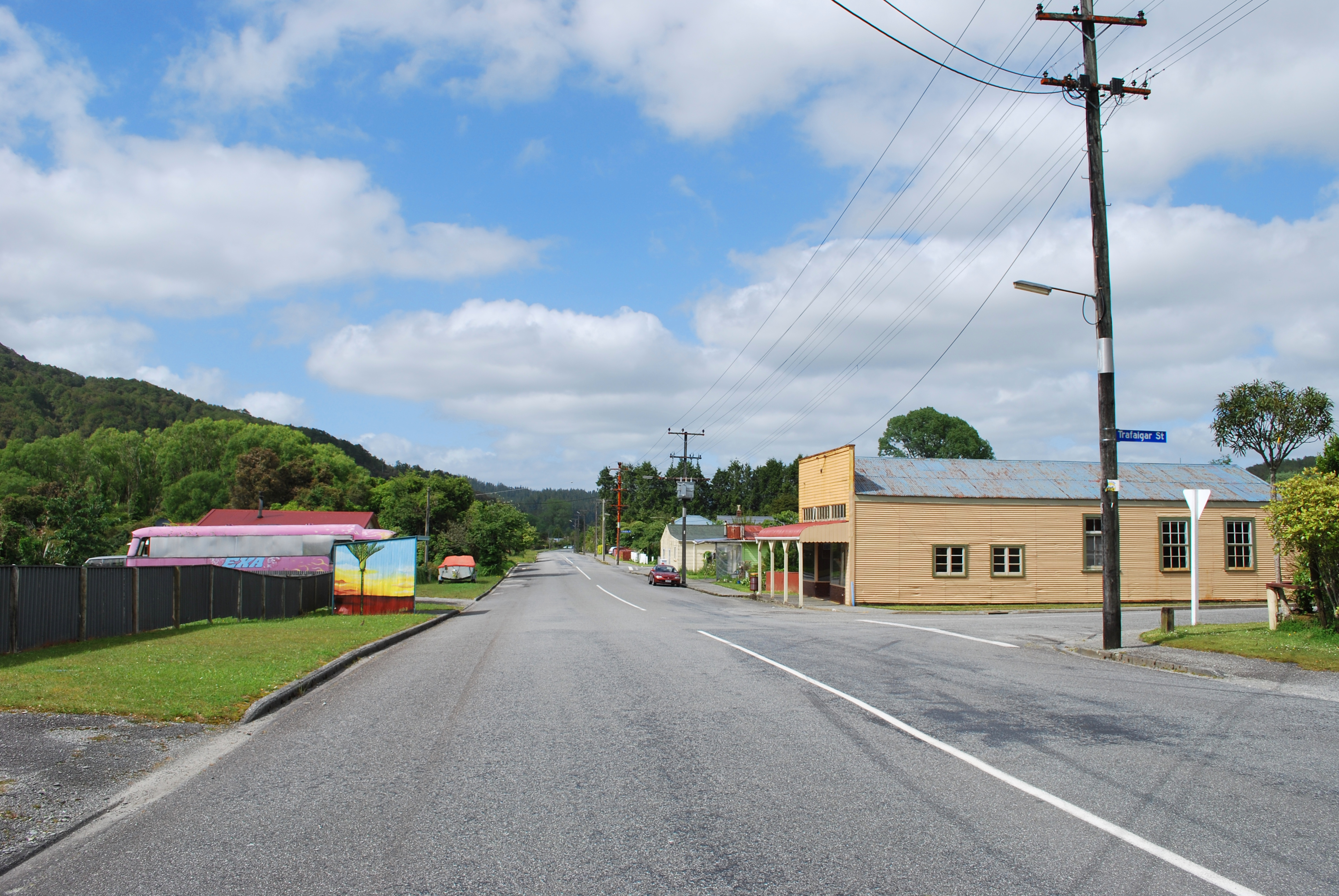
- Taylorville Road

- Location within New Zealand
- Coordinates: 42°26′25.28″S 171°18′51.01″E
- Country: New Zealand
- Region: West Coast
- District: Grey District

Taylorville is a small town on the banks of the Grey River in New Zealand. It is roughly 10 kilometres (6.2 mi) from the mouth of the river in Greymouth.

The local Taylorville swimming hole is popular for swimming and dog walking, but West Coast Regional Council advises against swimming in it after heavy rain due to elevated levels of E.coli. Taylorville is also beside the historic Brunner Mine site.

Taylorville was previously connected to Wallsend, located on the opposite side of the Grey River, with a suspension bridge for pedestrians providing a connection. The bridge washed away in the 1960s.

== Demographics ==
Taylorville covers 1.03 km^{2} (0.40 sq mi) and had a population of 174 in the 2023 census.

Dobson and Taylorville are described by Stats NZ as a rural settlement and cover 6.09 km^{2} (2.35 sq mi). They had an estimated population of 610 as of June 2025, with a population density of 100 people per km^{2}. Dobson and Taylorville are part of the larger Dobson statistical area.
