= Les Wood (footballer) =

New Zealand footballer

Personal information
- Full name: R Leslie Wood
- Place of birth: New Zealand
- Position: Outside right

Senior career*
Years	Team	Apps	(Gls)
- Auckland Thistle
- Metro College

International career
1936–1947	New Zealand	5	(1)
- * Club domestic league appearances and goals

Les Wood was a former football (soccer) player who represented New Zealand at international level.

Wood made his full All Whites debut in a 1–4 loss to Australia on 18 July 1936 and ended his international playing career with five A-international caps and one goal to his credit, his final cap an appearance in a 1–4 loss to South Africa on 19 July 1947.
