= Auckland Thistle =

- Full name: Thistle Football Club
- Nickname(s): Thistle
- Founded: 1903
- Ground: Auckland Domain

Auckland Thistle is an association football club in Auckland, New Zealand formed in 1903. Thistle won its first Auckland Football Association championship in 1914. The club disbanded in 1915 due to World War I until reforming in 1923. Thistle won the Auckland Championship on seven occasions between 1925 and 1937. In 1934 Thistle won the Auckland Championship and Chatham Cup.

== Competed ==
- 1925 Chatham Cup
- 1926 Chatham Cup
- 1930 Chatham Cup
- 1934 Chatham Cup (winner)
- 1936 Chatham Cup (runner-up)

== Players ==
- Dennis Smith
- Les Wood
- Cliff Banham
- Murray Kay
- Dick Hislop
- Ron Stone
- George White

Chatham Cup
Preceded by Ponsonby	Winner; 1934 Chatham Cup	Succeeded by Hospital
