= Andy Leslie (footballer) =

New Zealand footballer

Personal information
- Full name: Andrew Leslie
- Place of birth: Scotland
- Date of death: 1964

Senior career*
Years	Team	Apps	(Gls)
- Villa (Christchurch)
- Petone FC

International career
1936	New Zealand	1	(0)
- * Club domestic league appearances and goals

Andrew Leslie (died 1964) was a former association football player who represented New Zealand at international level.

Leslie made a single appearance in an official international for the All Whites in a 1–7 loss to Australia on 4 July 1936.

In 1927 Leslie joined Villa (Christchurch) from Petone and won the Canterbury Football Association's English Cup, beating Nomads in the final. Leslie scoring one goal and assisting the other in a 2–0 result. Leslie's performance in the English Cup final was singled out and commended by the Christchurch press.
