= Bob Innes (New Zealand footballer) =

New Zealand footballer

Personal information
- Full name: Robert C. Innes
- Place of birth: New Zealand
- Position: Right wing

Senior career*
Years	Team	Apps	(Gls)
- Ponsonby

International career
1923–1936	New Zealand	7	(1)
- * Club domestic league appearances and goals

Robert C. "Bob" Innes is a former association football player who represented New Zealand at international level.

Innes made his full All Whites debut in a 1–2 loss to Australia on 9 June 1923 and ended his international playing career with seven A-international caps and one goal to his credit, his final cap an appearance in a 0–10 loss to Australia on 11 July 1936. Although New Zealand have been beaten by more in unofficial matches, notably England Amateurs in 1937 and Manchester United in 1967, it remains New Zealand's heaviest defeat in official internationals.
