= Dobson, New Zealand =

Town in the South Island of New Zealand

Dobson
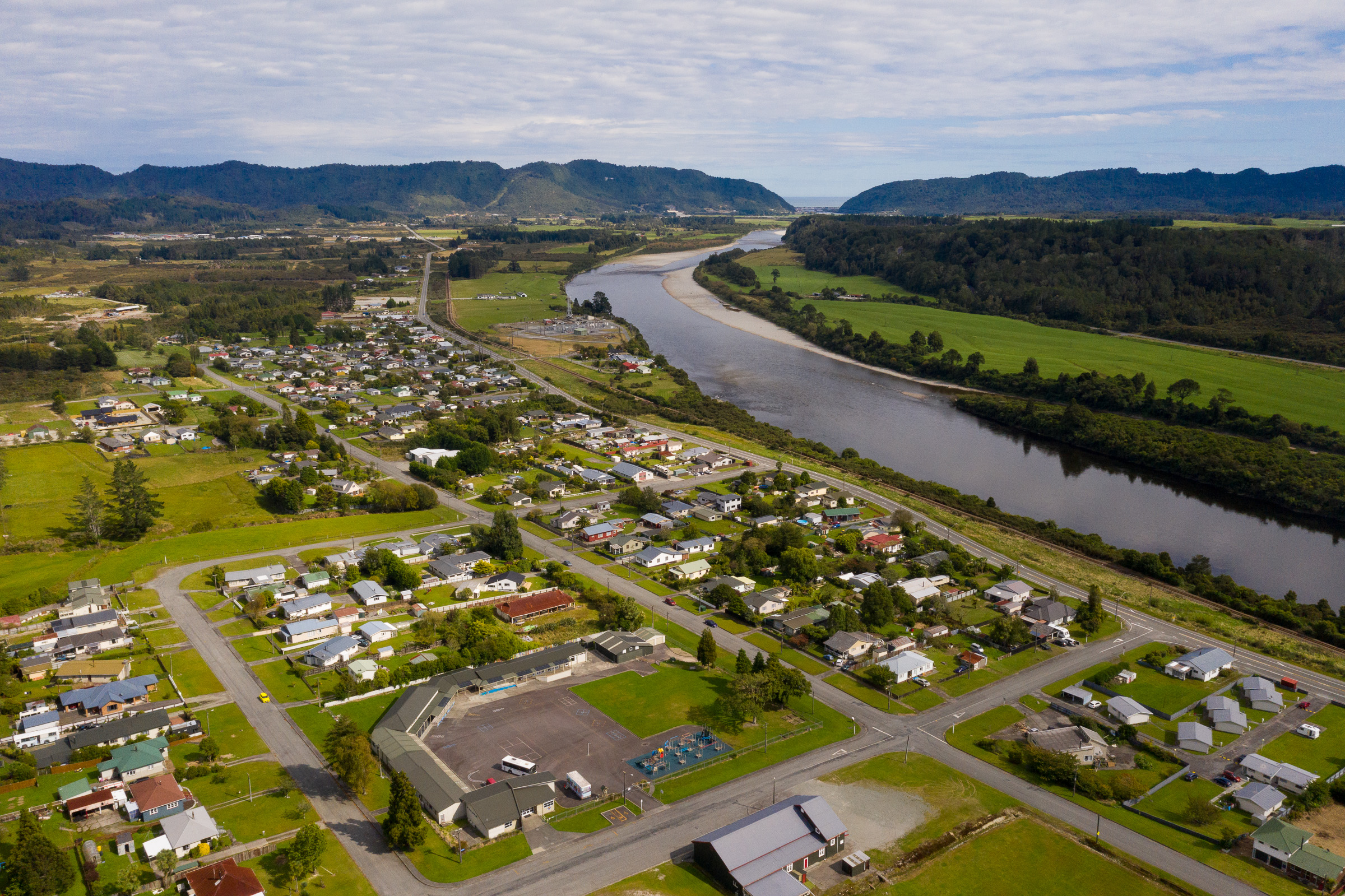
- State Highway 7 outside Dobson
- Interactive map of Dobson
- Coordinates: 42°27′10″S 171°18′18″E
- Country: New Zealand
- Region: West Coast
- District: Grey District
- Ward: Eastern
- Electorates: West Coast-Tasman; Te Tai Tonga

Government
  - Territorial Authority: Grey District Council
  - Regional council: West Coast Regional Council
  - Mayor of Grey: Tania Gibson
  - West Coast-Tasman MP: Maureen Pugh
  - Te Tai Tonga MP: Tākuta Ferris

Area
  - Total: 441 km^{2} (170 sq mi)

Population (2023 census)
  - Total: 411
  - Density: 0.932/km^{2} (2.41/sq mi)
- Local iwi: Ngāi Tahu

Dobson is a small town on the banks of the Grey River in the South Island of New Zealand. It is 10 kilometres (6 mi) east from the river's mouth at Greymouth. The settlement of Taylorville is across the river from Dobson, but no bridge directly connects the two. State Highway 7 passes through Dobson.

== History ==
The town is named for the surveyor George Dobson, the second son of Edward Dobson and brother of Arthur Dudley Dobson, who was murdered at this site in 1866. He was killed in a bungled robbery by the Burgess gang, who had mistaken him for a gold buyer carrying gold from the nearby Arnold goldfield. A monument now stands where George Dobson was murdered.

Dobson was the site of one of the West Coast's many coal mines. The Dobson mine was opened in 1919, and closed in 1968. It was the site of one of the country's worst mining disasters. Nine men were killed in an explosion at the mine in 1926.

A hydroelectric dam was proposed for the area by TrustPower in 1999 but it failed to secure access to public land that needed to be flooded for the scheme. In 2003 Nick Smith, who was an Opposition MP at the time, attempted to remove the reserve status from the land needed for the dam reservoir in order to allow the scheme to go ahead, but was unsuccessful.

== Demographics ==
Dobson and Taylorville are described by Stats NZ as a rural settlement and cover 6.09 km^{2} (2.35 sq mi). They had an estimated population of 610 as of June 2025, with a population density of 100 people per km^{2}. Dobson and Taylorville are part of the larger Dobson statistical area.

Historical population for Dobson and Taylorville
Year	Pop.	±% p.a.
2006	597	—
2013	591	−0.14%
2018	594	+0.10%
2023	585	−0.30%
The 2006 population is for a smaller area of 4.19 km^{2}. Source:

Dobson by itself has an area of 4.41 km^{2} (1.70 sq mi) and a population in 2023 of 411.

Dobson and Taylorville had a population of 585 in the 2023 New Zealand census, a decrease of 9 people (−1.5%) since the 2018 census, and a decrease of 6 people (−1.0%) since the 2013 census. There were 315 males, 264 females, and 3 people of other genders in 243 dwellings. 3.1% of people identified as LGBTIQ+. The median age was 46.7 years (compared with 38.1 years nationally). There were 87 people (14.9%) aged under 15 years, 87 (14.9%) aged 15 to 29, 282 (48.2%) aged 30 to 64, and 126 (21.5%) aged 65 or older.

People could identify as more than one ethnicity. The results were 94.9% European (Pākehā), 13.8% Māori, 0.5% Pasifika, 2.1% Asian, and 4.6% other, which includes people giving their ethnicity as "New Zealander". English was spoken by 97.9%, Māori by 1.0%, and other languages by 2.1%. No language could be spoken by 1.5% (e.g. too young to talk). New Zealand Sign Language was known by 0.5%. The percentage of people born overseas was 7.2, compared with 28.8% nationally.

Religious affiliations were 22.1% Christian, 0.5% Māori religious beliefs, 0.5% Buddhist, 1.5% New Age, and 1.5% other religions. People who answered that they had no religion were 64.6%, and 9.7% of people did not answer the census question.

Of those at least 15 years old, 39 (7.8%) people had a bachelor's or higher degree, 291 (58.4%) had a post-high school certificate or diploma, and 168 (33.7%) people exclusively held high school qualifications. The median income was $36,500, compared with $41,500 nationally. 39 people (7.8%) earned over $100,000 compared to 12.1% nationally. The employment status of those at least 15 was 231 (46.4%) full-time, 57 (11.4%) part-time, and 18 (3.6%) unemployed.

=== Dobson statistical area ===
Dobson statistical area covers 170.91 km^{2} (65.99 sq mi) and had an estimated population of 960 as of June 2025, with a population density of 5.6 people per km^{2}.

Historical population for Dobson statistical area
Year	Pop.	±% p.a.
2006	807	—
2013	822	+0.26%
2018	852	+0.72%
2023	909	+1.30%
The 2006 population is for a smaller area of 169.89 km^{2}. Source:

The statistical area had a population of 909 in the 2023 New Zealand census, an increase of 57 people (6.7%) since the 2018 census, and an increase of 87 people (10.6%) since the 2013 census. There were 501 males, 396 females, and 9 people of other genders in 354 dwellings. 2.3% of people identified as LGBTIQ+. The median age was 45.4 years (compared with 38.1 years nationally). There were 156 people (17.2%) aged under 15 years, 138 (15.2%) aged 15 to 29, 429 (47.2%) aged 30 to 64, and 183 (20.1%) aged 65 or older.

People could identify as more than one ethnicity. The results were 92.4% European (Pākehā); 12.9% Māori; 0.3% Pasifika; 2.3% Asian; 0.7% Middle Eastern, Latin American and African New Zealanders (MELAA); and 7.6% other, which includes people giving their ethnicity as "New Zealander". English was spoken by 98.3%, Māori by 1.0%, and other languages by 3.0%. No language could be spoken by 1.7% (e.g. too young to talk). New Zealand Sign Language was known by 0.3%. The percentage of people born overseas was 7.6, compared with 28.8% nationally.

Religious affiliations were 25.7% Christian, 0.3% Hindu, 0.3% Māori religious beliefs, 1.0% New Age, and 2.0% other religions. People who answered that they had no religion were 61.4%, and 9.6% of people did not answer the census question.

Of those at least 15 years old, 72 (9.6%) people had a bachelor's or higher degree, 444 (59.0%) had a post-high school certificate or diploma, and 234 (31.1%) people exclusively held high school qualifications. The median income was $36,500, compared with $41,500 nationally. 66 people (8.8%) earned over $100,000 compared to 12.1% nationally. The employment status of those at least 15 was 369 (49.0%) full-time, 87 (11.6%) part-time, and 27 (3.6%) unemployed.

== Education ==
Paparoa Range School is a coeducational full primary (years 1–8) school with a decile rating of 3 and a roll of 71 students as of July 2026. The school was established in 2005 when Kaiata (opened 1922), Stillwater (1888) and Brunnerton (extant 1874) primary schools were merged onto the Brunnerton Primary School site. Blackball School (opened 1895) became a remote classroom for Brunnerton School.
