= Millerton, New Zealand =

Millerton
- Interactive map of Millerton
- Coordinates: 41°38′4″S 171°52′38″E
- Country: New Zealand
- Region: West Coast
- District: Buller District
- Electorates: West Coast-Tasman; Te Tai Tonga

Population (2023)
  - Total: 138

Millerton is a small settlement in the northwestern South Island of New Zealand in the West Coast region. It is in the Papahaua Ranges, around 33 kilometres by road north of Westport, via SH67 from Westport to Karamea.

The history of Millerton bears some resemblance to that of Denniston, being a town that lived from and for the coal that was mined in the Ranges. Millerton has a population of approx 30-40. It was classified like Denniston as a ghost town in the 1970s but has had a resident population for several decades. It is possibly New Zealand's only populated hilltop township.

== Mining and incline ==
Despite its elevation of 300 metres being considerably lower than that of Denniston (600 metres), the steep grade between the coastline and Millerton still meant that the coal was difficult to get down from the hilltop to the coastal railway near sea level. The Westport Coal Company built the Millerton Incline in 1891 and the Millerton Mine began production in 1896. Mining at Millerton ended in the late 1960s, as it largely did at Denniston.

The Millerton Incline was a narrow gauge (2 ft or 610 mm) incline consisting of two parallel sets of tracks on which the coal tubs ran, being hauled by rope. Remnants of tracks, trucks, bath house and other installations are still visible. The Millerton Incline was a significant engineering achievement for its time, and the remains of this incline and its infrastructure are more accessible than those of the more famous Denniston Incline. The Millerton Incline was used to convey tubs of coal from the mines around the Millerton area to the bins at Granity, which were once the largest coal loading bins of wooden construction in New Zealand. The bins no longer exist, but the incline remains and can still be seen today.

Further images of Millerton, its ropeways and incline, can be accessed via the 'External links' below.

The Hon. William McIntyre from Millerton was a member of the Legislative Council from 1921 until he died in 1949, and was known as the Father of the Upper House. A miner from Scotland, he (with his brother) set a record for the coal mined in one shift at the Millerton Mine.

With the Denniston and the smaller Millerton mining operations having ended, the nearby Stockton coalfield is continuing the tradition of West Coast coal. Solid Energy New Zealand has planned to extend the life of the Stockton mining area by opening up the old Millerton Mine workings, albeit as an open cast pit.

== Demographics ==
Millerton and its surrounds, which include Stockton, cover 138.73 km^{2} (53.56 sq mi). It is part of the larger Buller Coalfields statistical area.

Historical population
Year	Pop.	±% p.a.
2006	90	—
2013	162	+8.76%
2018	156	−0.75%
2023	138	−2.42%
The 2006 population is for a smaller area of 111.78 km^{2}. Source:

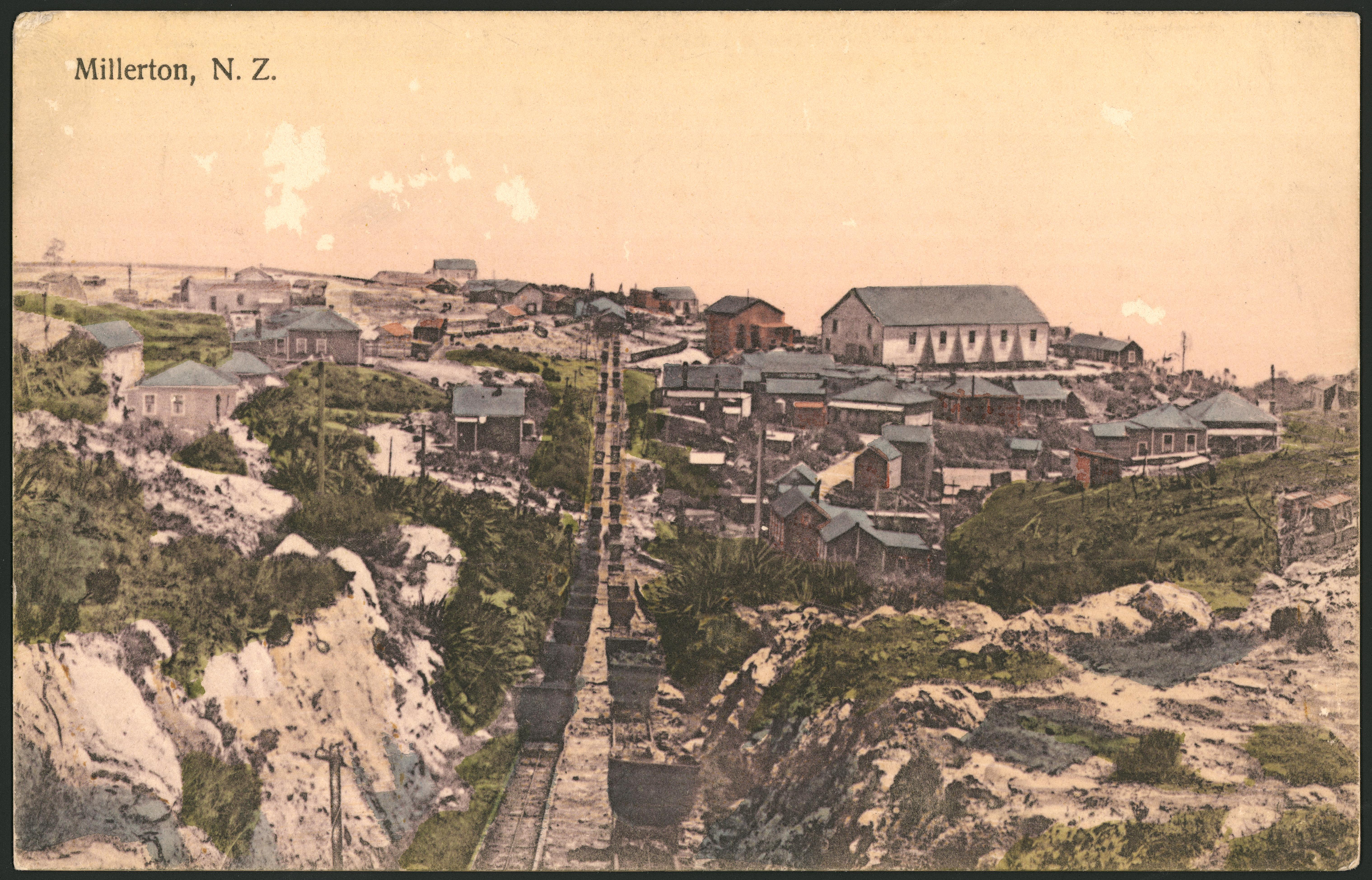
Millerton, c. 1910

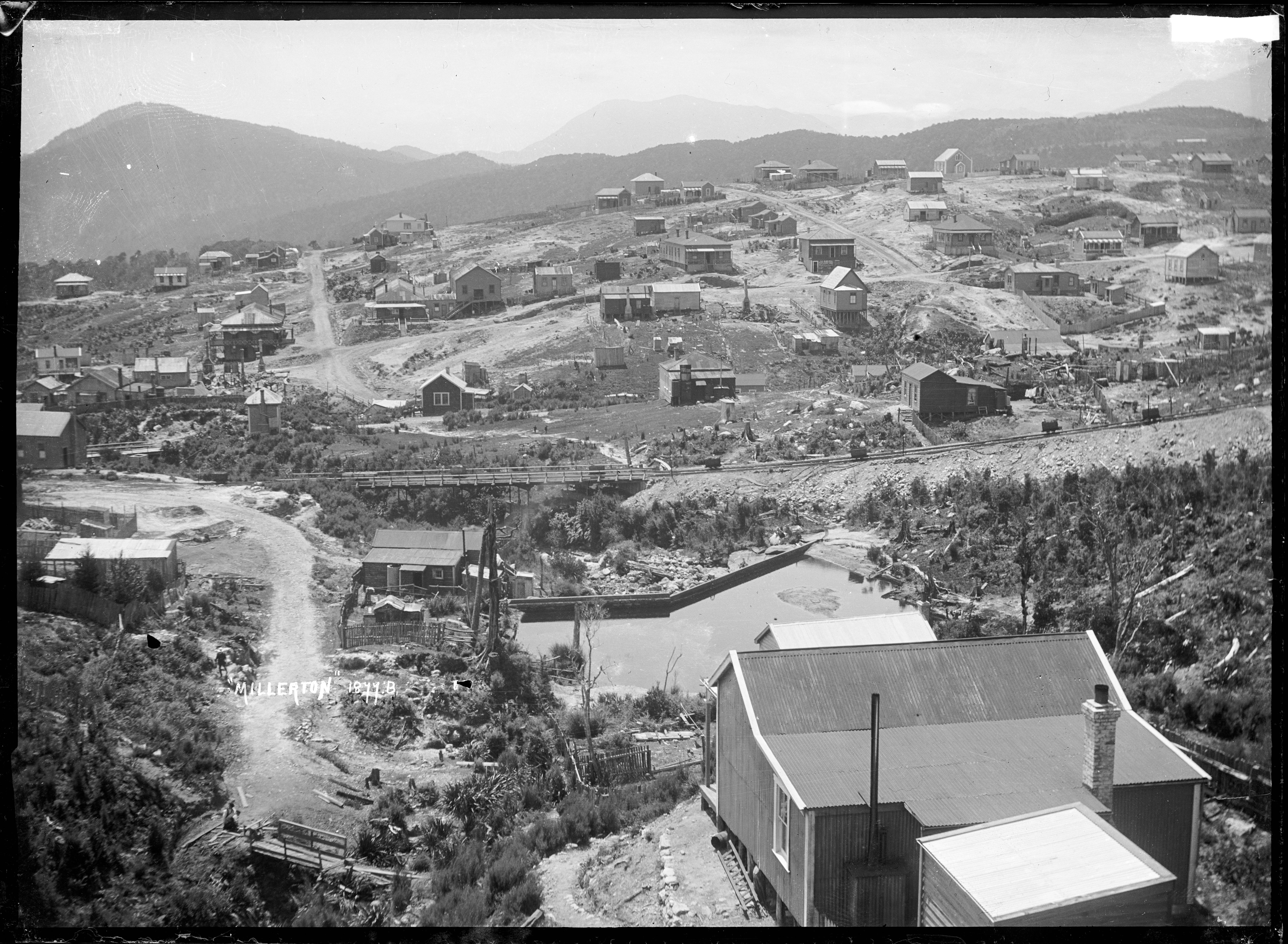
Millerton settlement

The area had a population of 138 in the 2023 New Zealand census, a decrease of 18 people (−11.5%) since the 2018 census, and a decrease of 24 people (−14.8%) since the 2013 census. There were 72 males and 66 females in 72 dwellings. 4.3% of people identified as LGBTIQ+. The median age was 56.4 years (compared with 38.1 years nationally). There were 21 people (15.2%) aged under 15 years, 12 (8.7%) aged 15 to 29, 78 (56.5%) aged 30 to 64, and 30 (21.7%) aged 65 or older.

People could identify as more than one ethnicity. The results were 91.3% European (Pākehā), 10.9% Māori, 2.2% Asian, and 8.7% other, which includes people giving their ethnicity as "New Zealander". English was spoken by 100.0%, Māori by 4.3%, and other languages by 4.3%. The percentage of people born overseas was 13.0, compared with 28.8% nationally.

Religious affiliations were 28.3% Christian, 4.3% New Age, and 2.2% other religions. People who answered that they had no religion were 56.5%, and 10.9% of people did not answer the census question.

Of those at least 15 years old, 21 (17.9%) people had a bachelor's or higher degree, 60 (51.3%) had a post-high school certificate or diploma, and 36 (30.8%) people exclusively held high school qualifications. The median income was $29,200, compared with $41,500 nationally. 9 people (7.7%) earned over $100,000 compared to 12.1% nationally. The employment status of those at least 15 was 54 (46.2%) full-time, 12 (10.3%) part-time, and 9 (7.7%) unemployed.

== Community ==
The Millerton football (soccer) club, known as the Millerton All Blacks, were twice runners-up in the Chatham Cup, New Zealand's knockout football competition, in 1932 and 1933.

Millerton had its own Lodge of the Royal Antediluvian Order of Buffaloes (Lookout Lodge No 127 of the R.A.O.B. NZ Constitution of the Grand Lodge of England). The Lodge was opened in 1950 and closed sometime in the mid-1980s.

== Tourism ==
Tourists often venture further up the West Coast north of Westport. Originally there was a narrow, steep and winding road to the township, but the steeper section of road has been closed and diverted, going directly to Stockton via 'The Grand Canyon'. Access is now off the new upper road section and is signposted, entering the township via the original road from the north-eastern end of the town. This 'old' road continues through the town and west towards the historic Millerton Incline, the portal and dam (part of an inclined rail system that took coal down to Granity). There are some extensive views here across the rainforest to the coast and north towards the Karamea headland. The closed section of old road can be walked down as far as the Millerton 'Granity Creek' Bridge, from which there are a series of waterfalls to be viewed. There is parking at either end of this walking section. The local community offers maps and information at the local community hall (in the township). There are several short walks in and around Millerton with historic sites and scenic views.

The bathhouse walks are additional trails in this area, and the Bathhouses themselves are of historic value also. A creek formed the reservoir dam where the coal miners used to come and bathe after a long day mining, and remnants of the pipework which flowed with hot water heated by the mines still remains at the site. In the township area one can see the mine sites and the incline brake head.
