= Christchurch Thistle =

Football club in New Zealand

- Full name: Thistle Association Football Club
- Founded: 1923
- Dissolved: 1963
- Ground: Barrington Park

Christchurch Thistle was a soccer club in New Zealand. The club lost 6 of the clubs first 11 players during World War II, including Alan Charles Davies. Club President Mr. A McAnulty said that "while the club was proud of the way in which its members had rallied to the colours, it felt keenly the loss of so many promising young players."

== Competed ==
- 1929 Chatham Cup
- 1930 Chatham Cup
- 1931 Chatham Cup
- 1934 Chatham Cup (runner-up)

== Players ==
- George McAnulty Alan Davies
