= 1947 Chatham Cup =

Tournament details
- Venue(s): Basin Reserve, Wellington
- Dates: 23 August 1947

Final positions
- Champions: Waterside (Wellington) (4th title)
- Runners-up: Technical Old Boys

The 1947 Chatham Cup was the 20th annual nationwide knockout football competition in New Zealand.

The competition was run on a regional basis, with regional associations each holding separate qualifying rounds. Teams taking part in the final rounds are known to have included North Shore United (Auckland), Waterside (Wellington) Wanganui Technical Old Boys (Whanganui), St. Andrews (Manawatu), Technical Old Boys (Christchurch), Northern Hearts (Timaru), Mosgiel (Dunedin), and Invercargill Thistle (Southland).

== The 1947 final ==
The 1947 final was played in ideal conditions in front of 6000 spectators at the Basin Reserve in Wellington. After the match the cup was awarded to the Waterside captain by the Governor-General of New Zealand of the time, Bernard Freyberg, 1st Baron Freyberg VC.

Bob Bolton, Toby Janes, and Tom Walker became the first players to play in four winning sides, having previously played for Waterside in the 1938, 1939, and 1940 finals. Waterside dominated the final, but no goals were scored in the first period. In the second half, Mark Bell scored for Waterside, only to have Colin Bailey equalise before the final whistle. The only goal of extra time came through Waterside's Toby Janes. Mr. J. Sanderson of Wellington became only the second referee (after G. Jackson) to officiate at two finals, having also been in charge in the 1933 final.

== Results ==
North Island semi final
3 August 1947

Wanganui Technical Old Boys	0 – 4	Waterside (Wellington)
	Report	Janes, Mildenhall, Bell, Walker

Cooks Gardens, Wanganui
South Island semi final
9 August 1947

Technical Old Boys	9 - 0	Northern Hearts
Grieve 4, Bailey 2, Thomas 2, Smith	Report

English Park
Referee: Mr. T. Gottermeyer
North Island Final
9 August 1947

North Shore United	2 – 3	Waterside (Wellington)
Richards, Robinson	Report	Walker, Powell, (Valentine og.)

Blandford Park, Auckland
South Island Final
16 August 1947

Mosgiel AFC	3 – 4	Technical Old Boys
McCloy, Davidson, Upland	Report	Thomas, Storer, Grieve, Bailey

Caledonian Ground, Dunedin
Referee: Mr. L. Swanson
Final
23 August 1947

Waterside (Wellington)	2 – 1	Technical Old Boys
Bell, Janes	Report	Bailey

Basin Reserve, Wellington
Attendance: 6000
Referee: Mr. J. Sanderson
