= 1940 Chatham Cup =

Tournament details
- Venue(s): Basin Reserve, Wellington
- Dates: 24 August 1940
- Teams: 27

Final positions
- Champions: Waterside (3rd title)
- Runners-up: Mosgiel

The 1940 Chatham Cup was the 17th annual nationwide knockout football competition in New Zealand, and the last such competition before the suspension of the Chatham Cup due to World War II. The competition resumed in 1945 as hostilities were drawing to a close.

The competition was run on a regional basis, with regional associations each holding separate qualifying rounds. Teams taking part in the final rounds included Ponsonby, Comrades (Auckland), Glen Massey, Waterside, Hamilton Wanderers, Nomads, Millerton Thistle and Mosgiel.

The Canterbury Football Association sought an explanation in August 1940 from the Buller Football Association after the Buller/Canterbury final played at Millerton recorded an expenditure of 5 shillings for ball boys at the Millerton Domain. In reply the Buller FA stated, "The field at Millerton was on a mountainside. If the ball went off the field at one end it would bounce down a three-mile truck line from the mine through tunnels down to Granity. If it went off on another side it would bounce over hill and dale down to Granity. On the other side it would bounce down either to Millerton or Granity. There remained only one end which could safely bound the field. It was therefore necessary to employ the services of an unusually large number of ball boys who were paid on the basis of 3d for every ball they prevented going down to Granity".

== The 1940 final ==
Waterside successfully defended the trophy for a second consecutive time, becoming the first team to win the trophy three times. The final also saw the first re-match since 1925, with the two teams having previously met in the 1938 final. Eight Waterside players (Sid Ward, Bob Bolton, Fred Hazel, Colin McCarthy, Tom Walker, Sonny Ward, Alf Longbottom, and Toby Janes) played in all three finals, and eight Mosgiel players played in both the 1938 and 1940 finals. Bolton, Janes, and Walker were each to gain a fourth final win in 1947.

Sonny Ward scored in the third consecutive final, taking his tally of cup final goals to four, and McCarthy added a hat-trick to his two goals in the previous season's final to take his overall total to a then-record five. The final was played in front of a record crowd of 8,000 spectators. Contemporary reports say that the final was the most one-sided in the cup's history up to that time. Despiute this, Mosgiel took an early lead with a second-minute goal from A. Sharpe. The equaliser came from Sonny Ward after 25 minutes, and from that point it became one-way traffic. Walker put Waterside into the lead and McCarthy added another only two minutes later. McCarthy added a further goal to give the Wharfies a 3–1 half-time lead. In the second half McCarthy added his third and then crossed the ball from a corner which Longbottom headed in for Waterside's sixth. Mosgiel gained a late consolation goal through W. Rogers.

The aggregate of eight final goals remains a record, though it has been equaled on five occasions, in 1955, 1958, 1960, 1989, and in the first final of 1972 (a year in which the final required two replays).

== Results ==
29 June 1940
Auckland Qualifier

Abel's	1 - 2	Auckland Thistle

Devonport Domain, Auckland
29 June 1940
Auckland Qualifier

Ponsonby	2 - 6	Comrades

Blandford Park, Auckland
29 June 1940
Auckland Qualifier

Auckland YMCA	2 - 4	Metro College

Victoria Park, Auckland
15 June 1940
South Auckland (Waikato) Qualifier

Hamilton Wanderers	0 - 2	Glen Massey

Seddon Park, Hamilton
29 June 1940
Wellington Qualifier

Hospital	5 - 1	Wellington Technical Old Boys

Basin Reserve, Wellington
29 June 1940
Wellington Qualifier

Seatoun	6 - 2	Swifts

Basin Reserve, Wellington
29 June 1940
Wellington Qualifier

Wellington Marist	3 - 1	Petone

Kelburn Park, Wellington
22 June 1940
Canterbury Qualifier

Christchurch Thistle	5 - 2	Nomads

English Park, Christchurch
6 July 1940
Otago Qualifier

Northern	5 - 4	Caversham

Logan Park, Dunedin
13 July 1940
Auckland Qualifier

Metro College	3 - 4	Comrades

Blandford Park, Auckland
13 July 1940
Auckland Qualifier

Auckland Thistle	1 - 3	Mt. Albert Grammar Old Boys

Blandford Park, Auckland
29 June 1940
South Auckland (Waikato) Final

Glen Massey	4 - 1	Rotowaro

Seddon Park, Hamilton
29 June 1940
Canterbury Semi-final

St. Albans	0 - 10	Western

Malvern Park, Christchurch
29 June 1940
Canterbury Semi-final

Christchurch Thistle	1 - 1 replayed	Christchurch Technical Old Boys

English Park, Christchurch
6 July 1940
Canterbury Semi-final replay

Christchurch Thistle	7 - 0	Christchurch Technical Old Boys

English Park, Christchurch
7 July 1940
Buller Final

Millerton Thistle	1 - 1	Ngakawau

Millerton Domain, Millerton
13 July 1940
Buller Final Replay

Millerton Thistle	3 - 0	Ngakawau

Millerton Domain, Millerton
13 July 1940
Wellington Semi-final

Waterside	7 - 1	Hospital

Basin Reserve, Wellington
13 July 1940
Wellington Semi-final

Wellington Marist	7 - 1	Seatoun

Basin Reserve, Wellington
13 July 1940
Otago Final

Mosgiel	8 - 1	Northern
W. Rogers ×4, J. Skinner, A. Davidson, W. Steven ×2	Report	MacFarlane

Logan Park, Dunedin
Referee: Mr. W. M. Smith
20 July 1940
Buller/Westland Final

Millerton Thistle	2 - 1	Runanga
A. Plummer, J. Tiplady	Report	Crowe

Millerton Domain, Millerton
Referee: Mr. O. Steel
20 July 1940
Auckland Final

Comrades	3 - 1	Mt. Albert Grammar Old Boys
M. Francis, Walters, Fincham	Report	Hopkinson

Blandford Park, Auckland
Referee: Mr. R. C. Brighton

=== Quarter-finals ===
13 July 1940
Canterbury Final

Western	3 - 3 aet replayed	Christchurch Thistle
G. Smith, R. Smith ×2	Report	McCann ×2, McLennan

English Park, Christchurch
Referee: Mr. R. C. Neville
20 July 1940
Wellington Final

Waterside	1 - 0	Wellington Marist
G. Walker	Report

Basin Reserve, Wellington
Referee: Mr. G. Jackson
27 July 1940
Canterbury Final Replay

Western	3 - 1	Christchurch Thistle
G. Smith, R. Smith, J. Druker	Report	M. White, W. Sutherland (red card)

English Park, Christchurch
Referee: Mr. R. C. Neville
27 July 1940
Auckland/South Auckland (Waikato) Final

Glen Massey	1 - 2 (a.e.t.)	Comrades
Gorman	Report	Masters, M. Francis

Seddon Park, Hamilton
Referee: Mr. T. Chalkin
3 August 1940
Canterbury/Buller Final

Millerton Thistle	2 - 0	Western
P. Taylor ×2	Report

Millerton Domain, Millerton
Referee: Mr. J. Robertson (Stockton)

=== Semi-finals (Island finals) ===
North Island Final
3 August 1940

Comrades	1 - 2	Waterside
J. Walters	Report	R. F. Ward ×2

Blandford Park, Auckland
Referee: Mr. R. C. Brighton
South Island Final
17 August 1940

Mosgiel	7 - 1	Millerton Thistle
J. Skinner ×4, A. Davidson ×2, W. Rogers	Report	P. Taylor

Logan Park, Dunedin
Referee: Mr. W. M. Smith

=== Final ===
1940 Chatham Cup Final
24 August 1940

Waterside	6 – 2	Mosgiel
McCarthy ×3, Sonny Ward, Walker, Longbottom	Report	Sharpe, Rogers

Basin Reserve, Wellington
Attendance: 8000
Referee: Mr. J. W. Graham

== 1941 to 1944 ==
Owing to World War II, competition for the Chatham Cup was shelved from 1941 to 1944. Major reasons were the commitments of players to the war effort and the use of fuel to carry teams between game venues at a time when the use of fuel was severely restricted. In announcing the suspension of the competition in April 1941, NZFA chairman Frank Campbell stated: "The council is reluctant to see the Chatham Cup competition stopped, but in all the circumstances considers the postponement of the competition for this season in the best interests of the country and the game." The question of reviving the competition was put to the council each year during the war, but it was not until 1945 that it was revived. In 1944, a junior competition for schoolboys, known as the N.Z. Boys' Chatham Cup and run on similar regional lines to the senior competition, was contested by 13 teams.
