= 1938 Chatham Cup =

Tournament details
- Venue(s): Basin Reserve, Wellington
- Dates: 3 September 1938

Final positions
- Champions: Waterside (1st title)
- Runners-up: Mosgiel

The 1938 Chatham Cup became the 15th nationwide knockout football competition in New Zealand, after a two-year gap caused by the lack of a 1937 Chatham Cup competition (see 1936 Chatham Cup for explanation).

The competition was run on a regional basis, with regional associations each holding separate qualifying rounds.

Teams taking part in are known to have included: Runanga and Taylorville (Westland), Millerton All Blacks (Buller), Maori Hill, Mosgiel and Northern (Otago), Glen Massey, Hamilton Wanderers, and Huntly Starr (South Auckland/Waikato) Nomads, St. Albans, Western and Christchurch Thistle (Canterbury), Petone, Miramar Rangers, Diamond, Seatoun, Marist, Waterside. Hospital, Scottish Wanderers, and Technical Old Boys (Wellington), Ponsonby, Eastern Suburbs, Auckland Thistle, and Abels (Auckland).

Millerton All Blacks withdrew from the competition in early July.

The South Auckland FA (SAFA) provincial finals, contested by Huntly Starr, Hamilton Wanderers and Glen Massey, took a month and five scheduled matches to complete, after the first round match between Huntly Starr and Wanderers had to be replayed over three match days. Two protests by Wanderers were successfully upheld by the SAFA. The first match in Huntly was won 3 - 2 by Huntly Starr, the second was won 3 - 0 by Huntly Starr, the third was drawn 0 - 0 aet. The fourth replay, a mid-week fixture on 27 July, was won by default as Wanderers made the journey to Huntly, but the Starr players were absent. A 15-minute grace period from the match referee was allowed, then the tie was awarded to Hamilton Wanderers. Two days later Hamilton Wanderers beat Glen Massey 6 - 1 at Seddon Park in the South Auckland provincial final. The very next day, 30 July, Hamilton Wanderers met Ponsonby at Seddon Park in the Auckland regional final, losing 3 - 1 to the Auckland provincial winners.

The penalty box arc was introduced into the New Zealand game in early 1938 with clubs required to mark their pitches accordingly in line with the English Football Association's new rule, with a 10-yard arc from the penalty spot, marked outside the box area. Another rule included in the recent amendments from Britain stipulated that, "all free kicks to the defending side in the penalty area must be taken in a forward direction, and the ball must not be played until it has traveled beyond the box".

== The 1938 final ==
The final was played in soggy conditions to which Mosgiel found it difficult to adapt. Despite playing with the breeze in the first half, the southerners were 1-0 down after just six minutes through a goal from Sonny Ward. Shortly after the half-time break Tom Walker doubled the lead, and a third was added by Toby Janes at the hour mark after a pass from Ward. Walker completed the scoring with a tap-in late on in the second half.

The fifth Governor-General of New Zealand, George Monckton-Arundell, 8th Viscount Galway, presented the trophy to Waterside after the match.

== Results ==
Wellington Final
16 July 1938

| Waterside | 2 - 1 | Seatoun |
|---|---|---|
| | Report |

Basin Reserve, Wellington
Referee: Mr. J. Duncan
Otago Final
16 July 1938

| Mosgiel | 3 - 3 aet | Maori Hill |
|---|---|---|
| C. Skinner, Steven, J. Skinner | Report | Balk, Henderson ×2 |

Logan Park, Dunedin
Referee: Mr. W. P. Smith
Otago Final Replay
23 July 1938

| Mosgiel | 2 - 1 | Maori Hill |
|---|---|---|
| Rogers, C. Skinner | Report | Henderson |

Logan Park, Dunedin
Referee: Mr. W. P. Smith
Auckland/South Auckland (Waikato) Final
30 July 1938

| Hamilton Wanderers | 1 - 3 | Ponsonby |
|---|---|---|
| Stewart | Report | Chapman, Mullane, Innes |

Seddon Park, Hamilton
Referee: Mr. E. R. Marsh
Canterbury/Westland Final
6 August 1938

| Nomads | 3 - 0 Taylorville walked off in the 80' | Taylorville |
|---|---|---|
| Wilkins, Craggs, Burnand | Report |

English Park, Christchurch
Referee: Mr. R. C. Neville

=== Semi-finals ("Island finals") ===
South Island Final
13 August 1938

| Mosgiel | 10 – 1 | Nomads |
|---|---|---|
| J. Skinner 7 (1 pen.), W. Rogers ×2, (M. Fail og.) | Report | J. Souter |

Logan Park, Dunedin
Referee: Mr. W. P. Smith
North Island Final
6 August 1938

| Ponsonby | 2 - 5 | Waterside |
|---|---|---|
| Callum, Ekman | Report | R. Ward ×3, Walker, Longbottom |

Blandford Park, Auckland
Referee: Mr I. Grieveson

=== Final ===
1938 Chatham Cup Final
3 September 1938

| Waterside | 4 – 0 | Mosgiel |
|---|---|---|
| Sonny Ward ×2, Walker, Janes | Report |

Basin Reserve, Wellington
Attendance: 4000+
Referee: E.J. McQueen
