= 1958 Chatham Cup =

Tournament details
- Venue(s): Basin Reserve, Wellington
- Dates: 9 August 1958

Final positions
- Champions: Seatoun (2nd title)
- Runners-up: Christchurch City

The 1958 Chatham Cup was the 31st annual nationwide knockout football competition in New Zealand.

The competition was run on a regional basis, with regional associations each holding separate qualifying rounds.

Teams taking part in the final rounds are known to have included Eastern Suburbs (Auckland), Rangers (Bay of Plenty), Hamilton Wanderers (Waikato), Eastern Union (East Coast), Stratford AFC (Taranaki), Colenso Athletic (Hawkes Bay), Wanganui Athletic, Kiwi United (Manawatu) Lansdowne United (Wairarapa), Seatoun (Wellington), Christchurch City (Canterbury), Oamaru (North Otago) and Northern (Dunedin).

In the Otago district final, the North Otago finalist Oamaru conceded 17 goals against Dunedin finalist Northern. George Little of Northern scored four goals in succession, on the way to a total of eight goals in the match.

== The 1958 final ==
In the final, Seatoun set a finals record by scoring seven goals, six of them from centre-forward John Donovan. Both of these feats are still cup records, though Seatoun's seven goal haul was equalled by Christchurch United in 1989. The aggregate of eight goals in the final equalled the record first set in 1940.

Donovan was supplied with a good series of crosses from his wings. The Wellington side battled into the wind during the first half, which remained scoreless for over half an hour before a late flurry of goals. Donovan opened his account after 37 minutes, and the score remained at 1–0 until three minutes before the break. Donovan and Raymond Wright then scored in quick succession, only to have Ken Giblett pull the score back to 3–1 with the last kick of the half. The second half was a one-man show, with Donovan taking the score from 3–1 to 7–1, three of the goals coming from headers. His remarkable record of a final double-hat-trick still stands as of 2009.

The final was notable in another way, as it was the first time that substitutes had been used in a Chatham Cup final. Neil Kerr (Seatoun) and Ken Giblett (City) were the first two substitutes to make finals appearances.

== Results ==
29 June 1958

Northern	17 - 1	Oamaru
G. Little 8, ?	Report	?

Tonga Park, Dunedin

=== Quarter Finals ===
12 July 1958

Northern	6 - 0	Brigadiers
	Report

Kensington Oval, Dunedin
12 July 1958

Eastern Union	0 - 3	Eastern Suburbs
	Report

Childers Road Reserve, Gisborne
12 July 1958

Kiwi United	1 - 3	Seatoun
	Report

North Street Park, Palmerston North
7 June 1958

Christchurch City	5 - 3	Nomads
	Report

English Park, Christchurch

=== Semi-finals ===
19 July 1958

Eastern Suburbs	2 - 4	Seatoun
Meyer, Anderson	Report	Donovan 2 Wright R. O'Brien

Blandford Park, Auckland
Referee: R. W. Cullen (Canterbury)
19 July 1958

Christchurch City	6 - 1	Northern
T. Munro, D. Worthington, P. Devine 3, K. Giblett	Report	A. Forbes

English Park, Christchurch
Referee: W. Ferguson (Southland)

=== Final ===
9 August 1958

Seatoun	7 – 1	Christchurch City
Donovan 6, Wright	Report	K. Giblett

Basin Reserve, Wellington
Referee: D. Welham
