= Stratford AFC =

- Full name: Stratford Association Football Club
- Founded: 1908
- Ground: Swansea Park, Stratford
- Chairman: Stu Hawkless
- League: Taranaki Division 3
- 2026: Taranaki Division 3, 3rd of 10
- Website: https://www.sporty.co.nz/stratfordafc
Home colours

Stratford AFC is an association football club from New Zealand. Its home ground and clubrooms are at Swansea Park in the town of Stratford, Central Taranaki. The club competes in the Taranaki Division 3.

Stratford AFC was established in April 1908 and joined the Taranaki Association Football Union in that year.

The club won the Taranaki Championship (Julian Cup) four times before 1965. The 1934 season for the Stratford club is notable by winning both the Taranaki Championship and Duff Rose Bowl while remaining undefeated in both competitions.

The 1958 Chatham Cup saw the club win the Taranaki final of the competition qualifiers and reach the North Island quarter-final against Kiwi United.

In 1967 the club joined the Central Districts League and competed in the first division with teams from Manawatū, Wairarapa and Hawke's Bay.

== Honours ==
Taranaki Championship - 1929, 1934, 1935, 1948.

Duff Rose Bowl - 1934, 1958, 1966, 1972, 1974.
