= 1939 Chatham Cup =

Tournament details
- Venue(s): Basin Reserve, Wellington
- Dates: 2 September 1939

Final positions
- Champions: Waterside (2nd title)
- Runners-up: Western

The 1939 Chatham Cup was the 16th annual nationwide knockout football competition in New Zealand.

The competition was run on a regional basis, with regional associations each holding separate qualifying rounds.

Teams taking part in the final rounds included Ponsonby, Waterside, Hamilton Wanderers, Western, Millerton Thistle and Mosgiel.

== The 1939 final ==
Waterside became the first team to successfully defend the trophy - something they were to again achieve the following year. Sonny Ward became the first player to score in two successive finals.

== Results ==
=== Semi-finals ===
North Island Final
5 August 1939

Ponsonby	1 - 3	Waterside
McCallum	Report	Walker 2, McCarthy

Blandford Park, Auckland
Referee: Mr. A. Kyle
South Island Final
19 August 1939

Western	4 - 3	Mosgiel
Almond 2, R. Smith, Galbraith	Report	J. Skinner, Rogers, Davidson

English Park, Christchurch
Referee: Mr. L. Doherty

=== Final ===
1939 Chatham Cup Final
2 September 1939

Waterside	4 – 2	Western
McCarthy 2, Longbottom, Sonny Ward	Report	Galbraith, R (Bob). Smith

Basin Reserve, Wellington
Attendance: 7000
Referee: Mr. S. Doree
