= 1957 Chatham Cup =

Tournament details
- Venue(s): Basin Reserve, Wellington
- Dates: 31 August 1957

Final positions
- Champions: Seatoun (1st title)
- Runners-up: Technical Old Boys

The 1957 Chatham Cup was the 30th annual nationwide knockout football competition in New Zealand.

The competition was run on a regional basis, with regional associations each holding separate qualifying rounds. Teams taking part in the final rounds are known to have included Eastern Suburbs (Auckland), Kawerau Town, Hamilton Technical Old Boys, Eastern Union (Gisborne), Moturoa, Colenso Athletic (Hawkes Bay), Wanganui Athletic, Masterton Athletic, Seatoun, Technical Old Boys (Christchurch), and Green Island.

== The 1957 final ==
In the final a young Seatoun side were too strong for Tech. Two goals in quick succession came for the Wellington side after about 15 minutes from Stanley Goddard and William Logan. Andy McAnulty reduced the deficit before the interval, but a second Logan strike just after the break took the score out of the Christchurch side's reach.

== Results ==
=== Quarter Finals ===
20 July 1957

Brigadiers	2 - 1	Green Island

Biggar Street Ground, Invercargill
6 July 1957

Western	3 - 5	Technical Old Boys
	Report

English Park, Christchurch
Referee: J. Davidson
20 July 1957

Seatoun	5 - 1	Wanganui Settlers
W. Logan ×2, S. Goddard ×2, R. Kearns	Report	W. Olding

Basin Reserve, Wellington
20 July 1957

Eastern Suburbs	2 - 3	Eastern Union
Wrathal ×2	Report	Kemp, Slyp, Begley

Blandford Park, Auckland

=== Semi-finals ===
North Island final
24 August 1957

Eastern Union	1 - 2	Seatoun
D. Watson	Report	W. Logan, S. Goddard

Childers Road, Gisborne
Attendance: 3000
South Island final
17 August 1957

Brigadiers (Invercargill)	1 - 3	Technical Old Boys
R. Morrison	Report	L. Fields, ?, V. Smith

Invercargill Showground, Invercargill
Referee: J. Davidson

=== Final ===
1957 Chatham Cup Final
31 August 1957

Seatoun	3 – 1	Technical Old Boys
W. Logan ×2, S. Goddard	Report	A. McAnulty

Basin Reserve, Wellington
Attendance: 5000
Referee: C.G. Edwards
