= Waterside Karori AFC =

- Full name: Waterside Karori Association Football Club
- Nicknames: Wharfies; Magpies
- Founded: 1987; 39 years ago (amalgamation)
- Ground: Karori Park, Karori
- Coordinates: 41°17′11.8″S 174°43′26.5″E
- Women's Coach: Marty Rodwell
- Chairman: Hugh Kettle
- Men's Coach: Tomás Godoy Fouquet
- League: Central League
- 2026: Central League, 7th of 10
- Website: www.karorifootball.co.nz
Home colours	Away colours	Third colours

Waterside Karori AFC is an association football club in Karori, a suburb of Wellington, New Zealand. They currently play in the Central League.

== History ==
Waterside Karori was formed in 1987 when Karori Swifts merged with Waterside. These two clubs had contrasting origins: Swifts were founded in 1894 from a Sunday School, and Waterside were founded in 1921 by dock workers. The current Waterside Karori club is still nicknamed Wharfies.

Waterside were originally based at Kaiwharawhara at Wellington's waterfront, a location still used by Waterside Karori. Waterside was a successful club at a national level in New Zealand in the 1930s and 1940s, winning the Chatham Cup in 1938, 1939, 1940 and 1947. However, the club was damaged by the wider effects of the in 1951 disaster hit the club. The 1951 waterfront strike which lasted 151 days and only five players returned from that industrially ravaged season to play in 1952. It took around 9 years for the industrial problems to recede, and then Wharfies started to rebuild.

In 1965, land was leased from the city council at Kaiwharawhara and clubrooms erected there. The area was top-soiled, drainage laid, and floodlighting installed, at considerable cost, to provide players with facilities approaching the best in Wellington at the time. In 1978 the club changed its name to Columbus Waterside in appreciation of the major sponsorship received from the Columbus Shipping Line.

The Wellington Swifts were formed in 1894. They played in a maroon shirt and dark shorts. The Swifts football club were a nomadic bunch with no roots to any one district, wandering all over Wellington before moving to Karori in the 1950's.

The Swifts were a successful club early on, winning the Venus Shield seven times before the First World War. This was the highest honour for Wellington teams prior to the Chatham Cup being established in 1923.

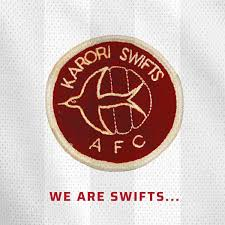
Former emblem of the Karori Swifts

The Wellington Swifts changed their name to Karori Swifts in the late 1960's, giving them an identity with the suburb. Benburn Park became the senior home ground and there were two junior sized grounds at Karori Park. The closeness to the Karori Cricket Club rooms, and the fact that a group of football players also played for Karori Cricket, started an association between the two clubs and with Karori Park.

By the mid 1980's, Waterside was a wealthy club and was experiencing success in the top men’s leagues. Karori Swifts strength was in its size. Karori had 10 men’s teams, 2 women’s teams and 40 junior teams, but it lacked success at the higher levels. A merger of the two clubs was seen to benefit Swifts by way of status and sponsorship money, whilst Waterside would benefit from expanding its small player base.

The merger took place in 1987, forming Waterside Karori AFC. The question of strip was easily decided. Waterside played in black and white, as did most other sports codes in Karori, so those colours became the club’s new strip..

The club currently has 14 men's teams, 3 women's teams and over 700 junior members.

In 2004 it became one of the founding principal clubs of the Team Wellington franchise in the New Zealand Football Championship.

== Women's National League 2024 ==
The Middleware Waterside Karori Women's team had a strong 2024 season in the Women's National League, consistently performing at a high level and securing key victories. They opened their campaign with a 3–2 win over Canterbury United, setting the tone for a competitive season. Their next match against Wellington United ended in a 1–1 draw, showing their resilience against tough opposition.

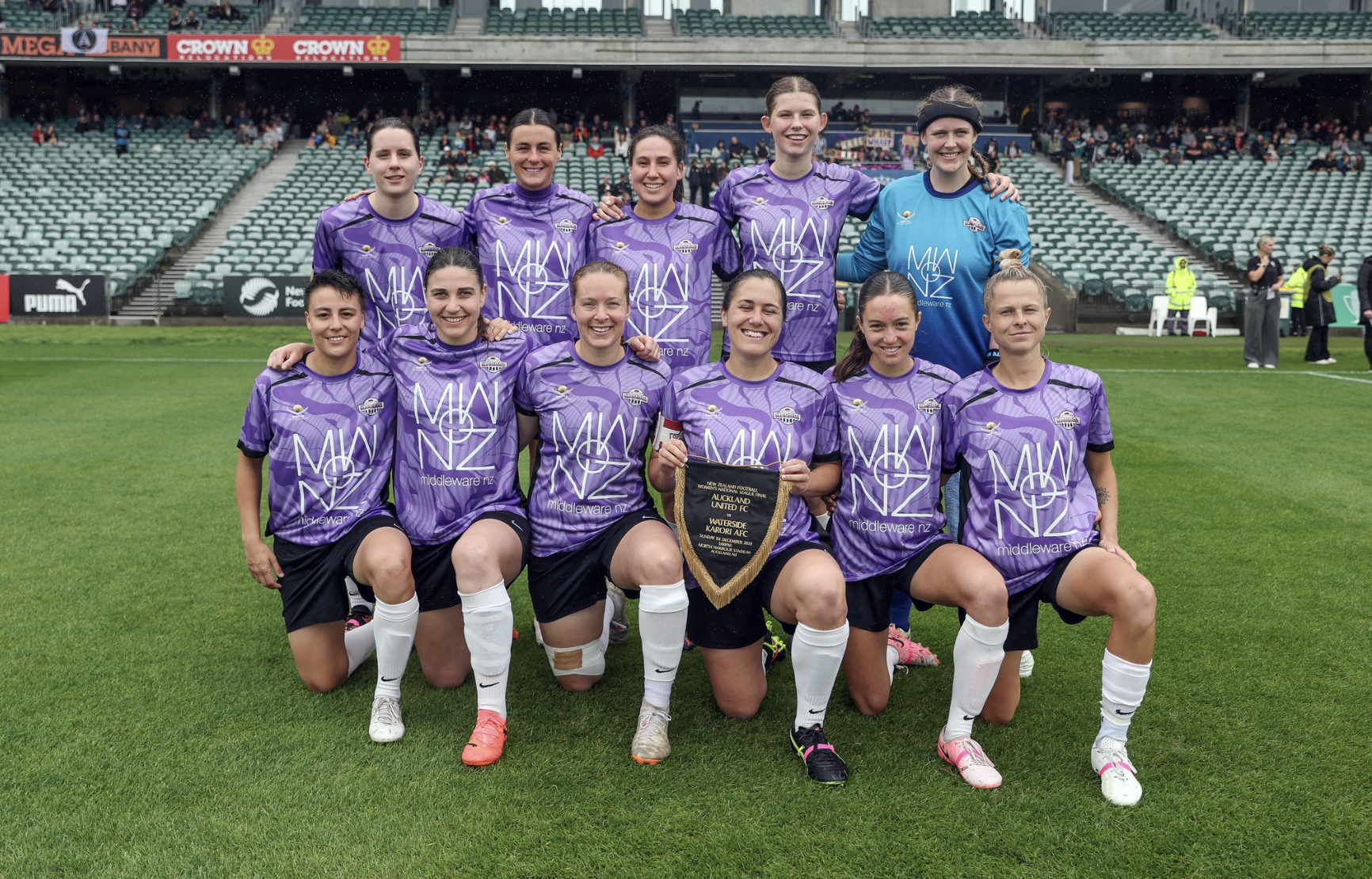
The Middleware Waterside Karori Women's team during the 2024 Women's National League Final. Their strong season saw them reach the Grand Final, marking a significant achievement in New Zealand women's football.

As the season progressed, Waterside Karori continued to impress, securing a 3–1 victory over West Coast Rangers. They maintained their momentum with a 3–0 win over Central Football, followed by a dominant 5–0 triumph against Wellington Phoenix Reserves. These results solidified their position among the top teams in the league.

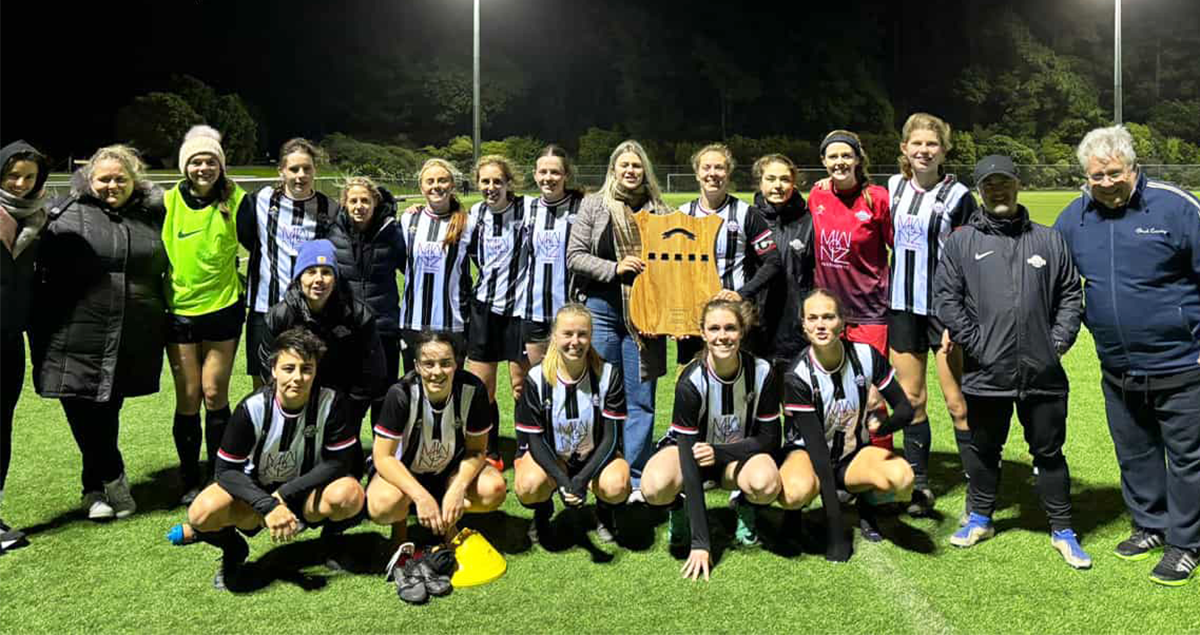
Waterside Karori Women's National League Team (2024) The squad that competed in the 2024 Women's National League reached the Grand Final and secured their place as one of the top teams in New Zealand women's football. This photo was taken after Waterside Karori won the Nora Watkins Memorial Shield, marking a historic achievement as the first team to claim the newly introduced challenge trophy in women's football.

Their final league match before the National League Grand Final was against Southern United, where they suffered a 2–0 defeat. Despite the loss, their overall performance throughout the season ensured their place in the final.

In the Grand Final, Waterside Karori faced Auckland United, a dominant force in New Zealand women's football. Despite a determined effort, they fell 3–1, with Auckland United securing their back-to-back championship victory. Waterside Karori fought hard, but Auckland United’s clinical finishing ensured their triumph.

Although they fell short in the final, Waterside Karori’s 2024 campaign demonstrated their growth and competitiveness. Their performances throughout the year solidified their reputation as a rising force in New Zealand women's football, and they are expected to remain strong contenders in future seasons.

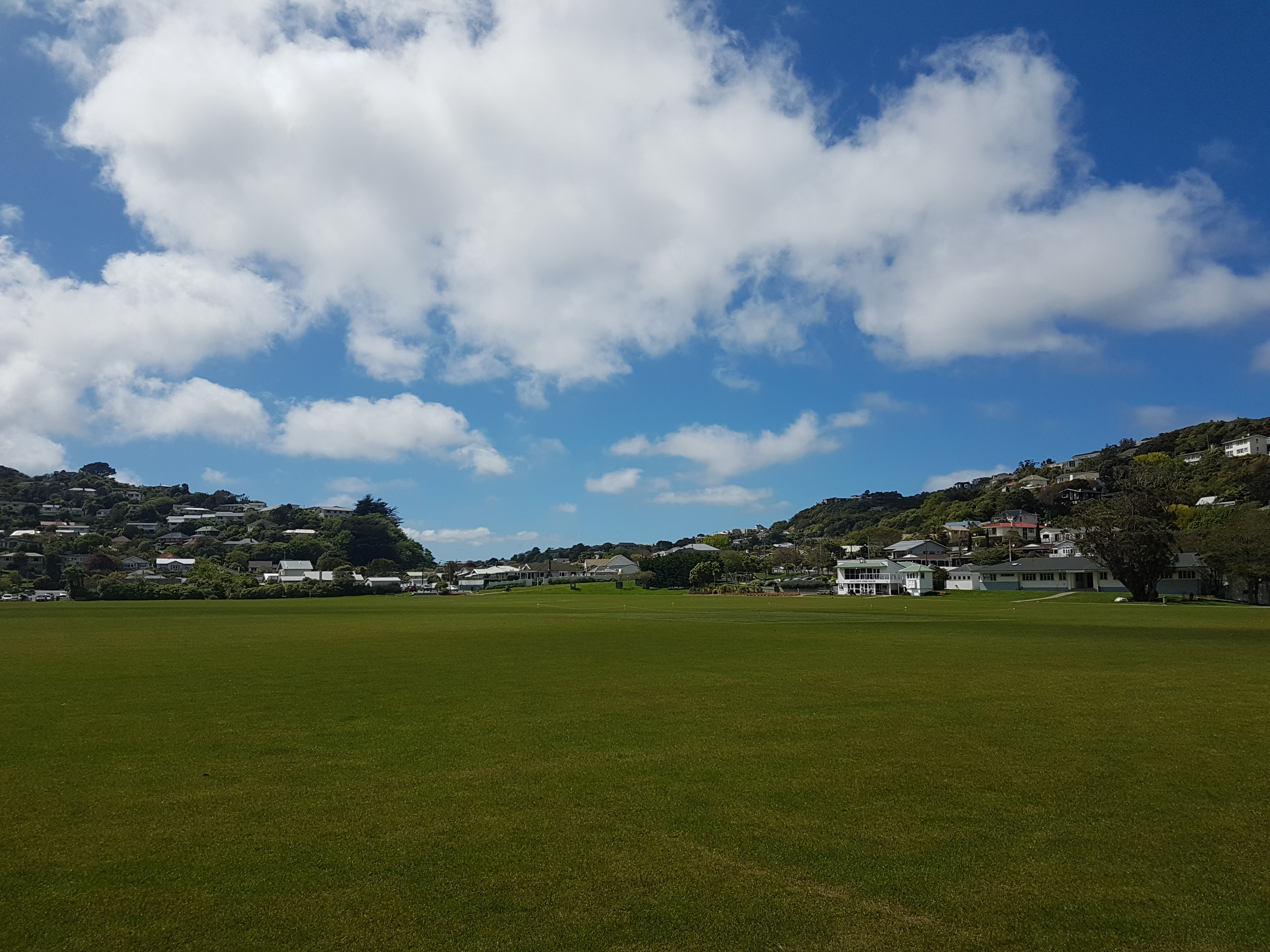
Karori Park looking back towards the clubrooms

== Honours ==
=== Men's ===
==== League ====
- Central First Division
  - Champions: 1970, 1971, 1973, 1977 (as Waterside), 1987, 1988 (as Swifts)
- Chatham Cup
  - Winners: 1938, 1939, 1940, 1947 (as Waterside)

=== Women's ===
==== League ====
- Women's First Division
  - Champions: 2011, 2022 & 2023

==== Cup ====
- Kelly Cup
  - Champions: 1992, 1997, 2009, 2011, 2022, 2023

Chatham Cup
Preceded by 1936 Western	Winner; 1938 Chatham Cup	Succeeded by Waterside
Preceded by Waterside	Winner; 1939 Chatham Cup	Succeeded by Waterside
Preceded by Waterside	Winner; 1940 Chatham Cup	Succeeded by WWII competition stopped 1945 Western
Preceded by Wellington Marist	Winner; 1947 Chatham Cup	Succeeded by Christchurch Technical Old Boys
