= Seatoun AFC =

- Full name: Seatoun Association Football Club
- Nickname: The Toun
- Founded: 1909
- Ground: Seatoun Park, Wellington
- Capacity: 500
- Coach: James Mac Aodhagáin
- League: Central League 2
- 2026: Central League 2, 6th of 10
Home colours	Away colours

Seatoun AFC is a football club in New Zealand, based in the Wellington suburb of Seatoun. Founded in 1909 by Charlie Webb, the club competes in the Central League 2.

== History ==
One of the strongest clubs in the country during the 1950s, it won the national knockout Chatham Cup in 1957 and 1958. Their 1958 win, a 7–1 win over Christchurch City, remains the highest score by any team in a Chatham Cup final (equalled in 1989 by Christchurch United).

11 players (senior men) have represented NZ whilst playing for Seatoun - Grahame Bilby, Rex Boyes, Keith Gibson, Bert Hiddlestone, Mike Jones, Ron Kearns, Rodney Reid, Duncan Ritchie, Dave Strom, Phil Traynor, Ian Upchurch. Also a number of international players have played for Seatoun at some stage including Paul Rennell, Shane Rufer, Michael Utting, Jeff Strom, Rupert Ryan, Billy Harris, Paul Cameron, Garry Welch.

In 2013 the Seatoun AFC First Team, coached by player/coach Steve Dimakis, beat Marist AFC 3–2 in a playoff for promotion to Capital Premier. This was the third consecutive promotion for the team, having risen from Capital 3 in 2010, mostly due to the great play of Hamdi Yusuf and Doug Moalay. However, times have been tough recently for the club, received three straight demotions down to capital two. The Seatoun first team gained promotion into Capital 1 after a highly successful 2018 season that saw them 12 points above their nearest competition on the table.

In 2024 both the first team and reserve side of Seatoun AFC gained promotion with the first team getting promoted from capital premier to the newly formed central league 2 and the reserve side jumping from capital two and into capital one.

Both sides saw heavy departures at the end of the 2024 season and are currently rebuilding and strengthening their squads ahead of the 2025 season as the two men's sides prepare for the step up as they compete in new more competitive leagues.

== Teams ==
=== Senior Men's ===
- Seatoun AFC First Team (central league 2)
- Seatoun AFC Reserves (Capital 1)
- Seatoun AFC (Capital 6)

=== Masters ===
- Seatoun Mariners (Masters Division 1)
- Seatoun AFC (Masters Division 3)
- Seatoun Originals (Masters Over 42 League)
- Seatoun Vorstermans Architect 99s (Masters Over 42 League)

=== Women's ===
- Women's W-League

=== U17s Youth Teams ===
- Under 17A (Under 17 A division 2019)
- Under 17B (Under 17 C division 2018)

Chatham Cup
Preceded by Stop Out	Winner; 1957 Chatham Cup	Succeeded by Seatoun
Preceded by Seatoun	Winner; 1958 Chatham Cup	Succeeded by Northern
