= Blandford Park =

Former football field in Auckland, New Zealand

Coordinates: 36.8550°S 174.7703°E

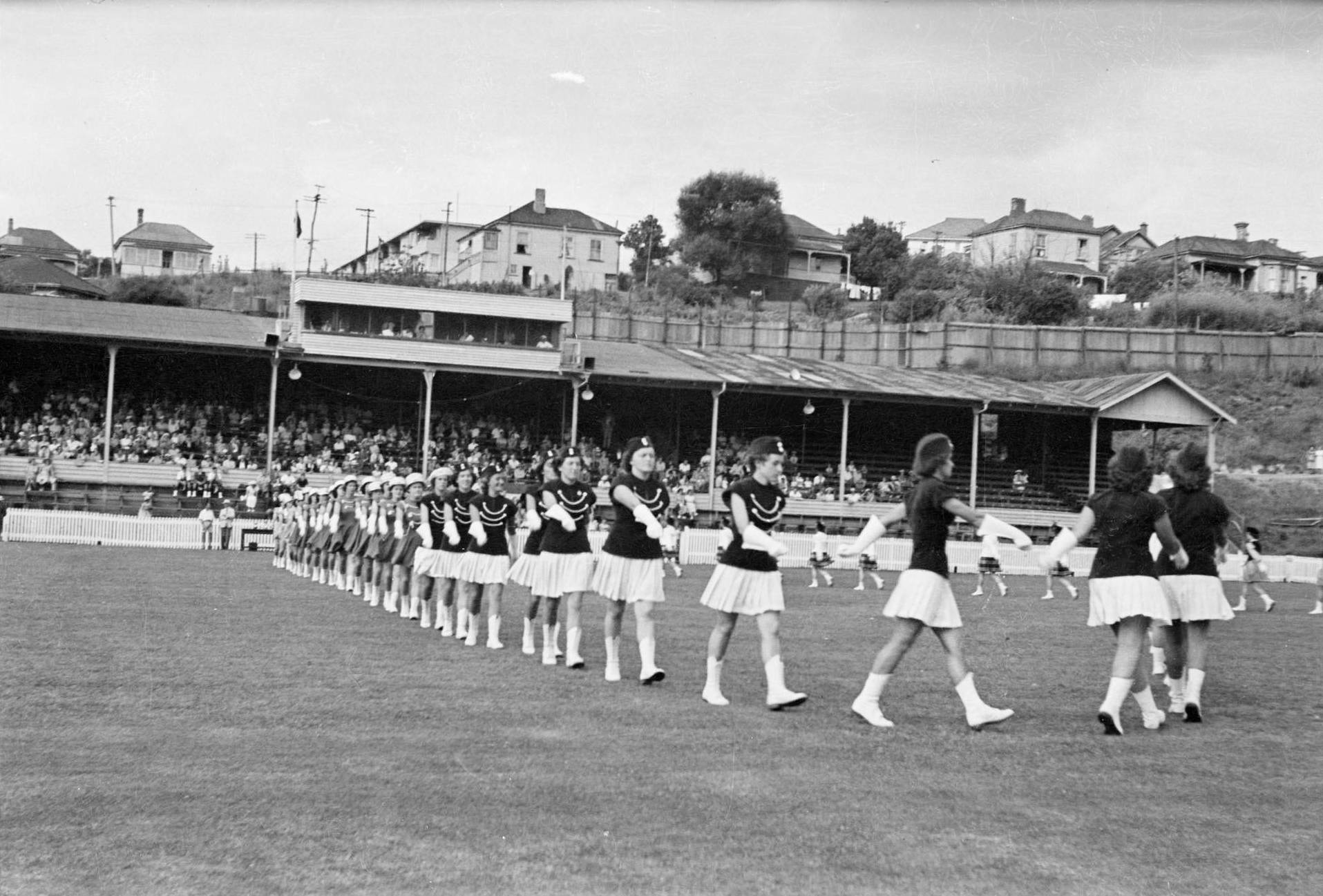
New Zealand marching girls at Blandford Park in the 1940s or 1950s

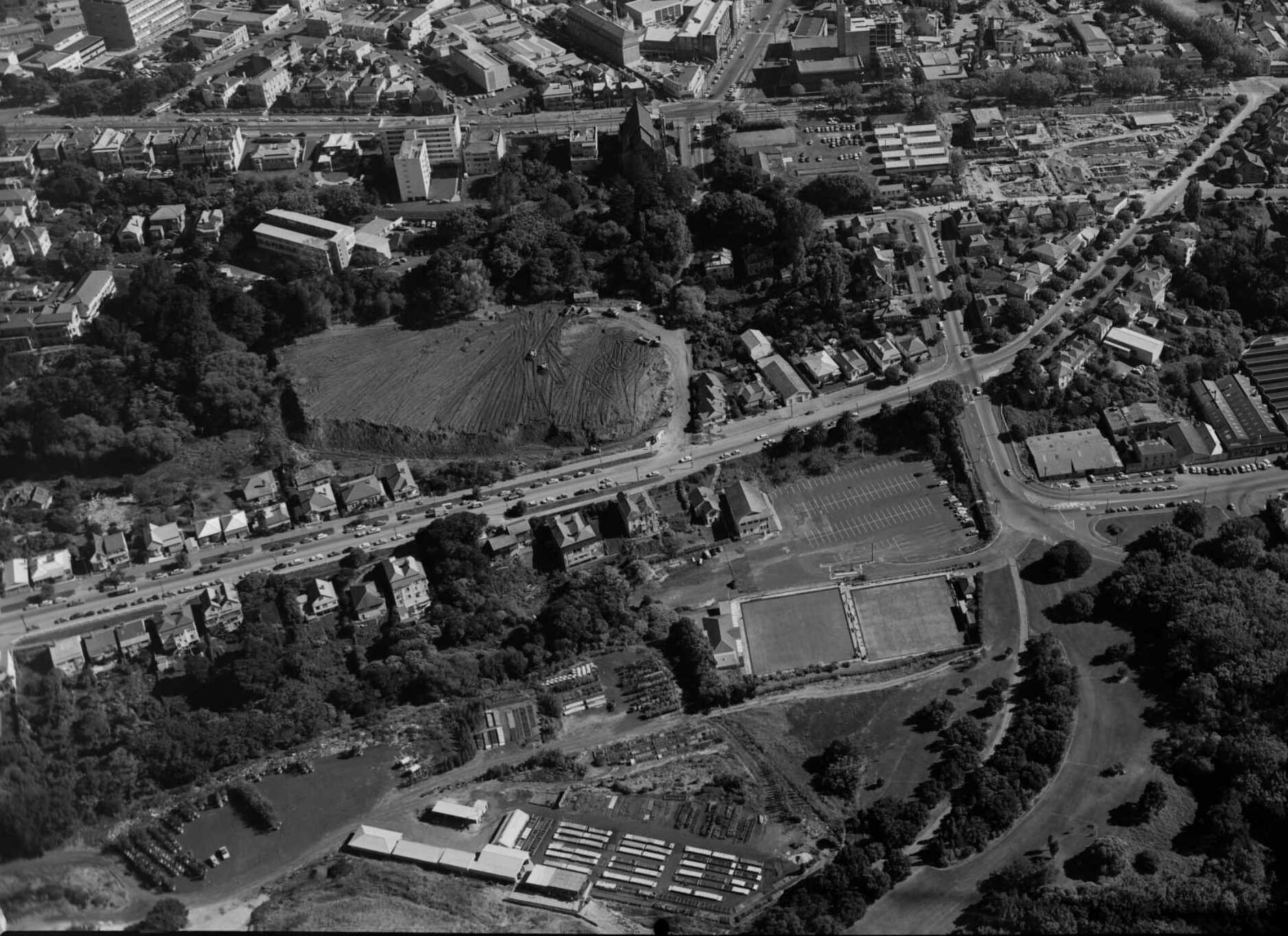
Aerial view of the razing of Blandford Park in the Grafton Gully in 1966

Blandford Park, in Auckland, New Zealand, was the home of association football in Auckland for much of the 20th century, and one of the country's main football grounds. Located in Grafton Gully, northeast of Grafton Bridge, roughly between the northern part of Whitaker Place and the Auckland Bowls Club in Grafton Mews, it was razed in the mid-1960s, and its site is now occupied by on- and off-ramps to the Auckland Central Motorway Junction.

The ground hosted a considerable number of notable football matches, including several international fixtures and many of the Auckland regional finals and national semi-finals of the Chatham Cup.

Originally owned by Morgan Blandford (for whom it is named), the park was in existence at least as early as 1913. In 1923, Blandford leased the park to the Auckland Football Association for a period of 30 years, with an option to buy outright after that point. The park was unappealing at the time, with contemporary reports noting that it was swampy and seemed to be a general dumping ground.

Over the course of the next two years, the AFA attempted to transform the park, clearing the land and adding terraces which could accommodate several thousand spectators. The park had easy access from Grafton Bridge and was handy to most of the city's main tram lines. The ground was officially opened in mid 1925.

The marshiness of the ground was, however, still a major problem, and could not be easily remedied. The ground was located in a low-lying basin with considerable run-off from the surrounding hills. The situation was not helped by the AFA's decision to offer a 30-year sub-lease of the ground during football's off-season to another group, the Stadium Company. This group began to run cycling competitions at the ground, adding to the disrepair of the surface. Despite legal wrangles between the AFA and the Stadium Company, in which the AFA tried to terminate the sub-lease, the ground deterioration continued, with cycling, and later speedway still being run at the park. Other sports played at the park included softball, and the ground was the home of the Grafton Cricket Club.

During the late 1940s, the AFA tried to negotiate with the Auckland City Council for the purchase of the park after the AFA lease expired. The council considered the offer but found that there were numerous problems: the ground was of an unsuitable size for most public sporting uses, its drainage problems still persisted, and - with the increase in private motor vehicle use - its lack of parking space was considered a distinct disadvantage. It was also noted at the time that the whole of the Grafton Gully area was likely to be needed for motorway use at some point in the not-too-distant future. In the end a compromise was reached, with the Auckland City Council acquiring the lease on the park and sub-letting it to the AFA.

After a legal wrangle with the park's owners, the park became council property in 1953, earmarked for roading purposes. The AFA continued to use the ground as its headquarters until 1964, when it moved to Newmarket Park. With the building of the motorway the park initially became a dumping ground for quarried spoil before being buried beneath part of the motorway itself.
